= List of 2013 Hockey India League team rosters =

2013 Hockey India League, known as Hero Hockey India League (abbreviated as HIL 2013) was the first season of the hockey tournament Hockey India League. Tournament was scheduled to start from 5 January to 3 February but was postponed to 14 January to 10 February. Each team was composed of 14 Indian and 10 foreign player which were acquired in the auction. A total of 246 players were available for the auction out of which 120 players were bought by the franchises which included 50 foreign and 70 local players.

== Delhi Waveriders ==
Delhi Waveriders
Player	Nationality	Matches	Goals			
Goal Keepers
Nicolas Jacobi	Germany	13	–	0	0	0
Pirmin Blaak	Netherlands	1	–	0	0	0
Forwards
Akashdeep Singh	India	14	3	0	0	0
Danish Mujtaba	India	12	1	1	0	0
Gurwinder Singh Chandi	India	13	5	2	1	0
Imran Khan	India	13	1	0	0	0
Lloyd Norris-Jones	South Africa	14	6	1	0	0
Matthew Gohdes	Australia	14	0	1	1	0
Oskar Deecke	Germany	14	4	0	0	0
Simon Child	New Zealand	14	5	1	0	0
Talwinder Singh	India	12	0	0	1	0
Yuvraj Valmiki	India	12	1	4	0	0
Mid-fielders
Andrés Mir	Spain	14	3	0	0	0
Bipin Kishor Kerketta	India	0	0	0	0	0
Gurbaj Singh	India	14	0	3	0	0
Sardar Singh (captain)	India	14	0	2	2	0
Tim Jenniskens	Netherlands	14	1	0	0	0
Defenders
Andrew Hayward	New Zealand	8	1	0	0	0
Dean Couzins	New Zealand	8	0	0	0	0
Hans Raj	India	3	0	0	0	0
Lovedeep Singh	India	0	0	0	0	0
Rupinder Pal Singh	India	13	7	0	0	0
Surender Kumar	India	8	0	0	0	0
Vikramjit Singh	India	0	0	0	0	0
Coach: Ajay Kumar Bansal; Manager: Ajit Pal Singh

== Punjab Warriors ==
Punjab Warriors
Player	Nationality	Matches	Goals			
Goal Keepers
Bharat Chettri	India	8	–	0	0	0
Keshav Dutt	India	0	–	0	0	0
Jaap Stockmann	Netherlands	14	–	0	0	0
Forwards
Dharamvir Singh	India	14	4	1	1	0
Gaganpreet Singh	India	8	0	0	0	0
Jamie Dwyer (captain)	Australia	14	4	1	0	0
Jarmanpreet Singh	India	14	0	1	0	0
Kieran Govers	Australia	13	2	0	0	0
Malak Singh	India	12	4	0	1	0
Ranjit Singh	India	14	2	0	1	1
Roger Padrós	Spain	4	1	0	0	0
Russell Ford	Australia	11	1	1	0	0
Shivendra Singh	India	5	1	0	0	0
Sukhdev Singh	India	11	0	1	0	0
S.V. Sunil	India	13	4	0	0	0
Mid-fielders
Gurinder Singh	India	13	0	1	1	0
Gurmail Singh	India	14	0	1	1	0
Lucas Rey	Argentina	13	0	0	0	0
Nilakanta Sharma	India	6	0	0	0	0
Robert Hammond	Australia	14	1	0	2	0
Simon Orchard	Australia	10	0	0	0	0
Defenders
Christopher Ciriello	Australia	14	3	1	0	0
Ignace Tirkey	India	14	0	0	0	0
Mark Knowles	Australia	14	1	2	0	0
Coach: Barry Dancer; Manager: Jagbir Singh

== Mumbai Magicians ==
Mumbai Magicians
Player	Nationality	Matches	Goals			
Goal Keepers
P. R. Shreejesh	India	12	–	0	0	0
P.T. Rao	India	2	–	0	0	0
Forwards
Anup Valmiki	India	11	0	2	1	0
Faizal Saari	Malaysia	12	0	0	1	0
Glenn Simpson	Australia	9	0	0	0	0
Glenn Turner	Australia	12	2	0	1	0
Jason Wilson	Australia	7	2	2	0	0
K. Chinglensana Singh	India	12	1	0	1	0
Sarvanjit Singh	India	12	0	1	0	0
Satbir Singh	India	12	1	2	0	0
Sanjay Kumar Bir	India	5	0	1	0	0
Mid-fielders
Jonny Jasrotia	India	10	1	1	0	0
Matthew Butturini	Australia	10	0	1	0	0
M.B. Aiyappa	India	12	0	0	0	0
Suresh Toppo	India	3	0	0	0	0
Steven Edwards	New Zealand	10	0	0	0	0
Timothy Deavin	Australia	10	0	0	0	0
Defenders
Chandan Singh	India	11	0	1	1	0
Gagandeep Singh	India	3	0	0	0	0
Joel Carroll	Australia	12	0	0	0	0
Liam de Young	Australia	10	1	0	1	0
Matthew Swann	Australia	12	0	1	0	0
Sampath Kumar Maylaram	India	3	0	0	0	0
Sandeep Singh (captain)	India	12	11	1	1	0
Coach: Ric Charlesworth; Manager: Graham Reid

== Ranchi Rhinos ==
Ranchi Rhinos
Player	Nationality	Matches	Goals			
Goal Keepers
Francisco Cortés Juncosa	Spain	13	–	0	0	0
Sushant Tirkey	India	3	–	0	0	0
Forwards
Floris Evers	Netherlands	12	1	2	0	0
Mandeep Singh	India	13	10	1	0	0
Nicholas Wilson	New Zealand	11	5	0	0	0
Prabhdeep Singh	India	14	0	0	0	0
Stanli Victor Minz	India	11	0	1	0	0
Tarandeep Singh	India	9	1	0	1	0
Vikas Choudhary	India	11	1	0	0	0
Mid-fielders
Arvind Kujur	India	4	0	0	0	0
Ashley Jackson	England	12	5	0	0	0
Austin Smith	South Africa	11	2	0	0	0
Birendra Lakra	India	12	0	0	0	0
Kothajit Singh	India	13	0	1	0	0
Manpreet Singh	India	14	2	3	2	0
Moritz Fürste (captain)	Germany	11	1	1	0	0
Parvinder Singh	India	7	0	1	0	0
Defenders
Amit Rohidas	India	13	0	0	0	0
Bosco Pérez-Pla	Spain	10	0	1	0	0
Fergus Kavanagh	Australia	10	0	0	0	0
Justin Reid-Ross	South Africa	12	4	3	1	0
Khadangbam Rinel Singh	India	10	0	0	0	0
Sumit Topno	India	1	0	0	0	0
Coach: Gregg Clark; Manager: David John

== Uttar Pradesh Wizards ==
Uttar Pradesh Wizards
Player	Nationality	Matches	Goals			
Goal Keepers
George Bazeley	Australia	13	–	0	0	0
Kumar Subramaniam	Malaysia	1	–	0	0	0
Sreenivasa Rao Katharu	India	2	–	0	0	0
Forwards
Jeroen Hertzberger	Netherlands	14	5	1	0	0
Malayalan Gunasekar	India	7	1	0	0	0
Nithin Thimmaiah	India	13	2	1	0	0
P.L. Thimmanna	India	10	0	1	0	0
Pradhan Somanna	India	14	1	1	2	0
S.K. Uthappa	India	12	1	1	0	0
Teun de Nooijer	Netherlands	14	0	1	0	0
Tushar Khandker	India	14	0	0	0	0
Mid-fielders
David Alegre	Spain	14	1	0	0	0
Edward Ockenden	Australia	13	0	0	0	0
Harjeet Singh	India	4	0	0	0	0
Pradeep Mor	India	14	1	0	1	0
Rocky Lohchab	India	4	0	0	0	0
Sander Baart	Netherlands	14	0	0	0	0
Siddharth Shanker	India	7	1	0	0	0
Vivek Dhar	India	12	0	0	1	0
Defenders
Harbir Singh Sandhu	India	12	0	2	0	0
Luke Doerner	Australia	13	2	1	0	0
Marcel Balkestein	Netherlands	14	0	1	0	0
V.R. Raghunath (captain)	India	14	9	1	0	0
Wouter Jolie	Netherlands	13	0	0	2	0
Coach: Roelant Oltmans; Manager: Maneck Kotwal

== See also ==
- Hockey India League
- 2013 Hockey India League
