= 2015 Hockey India League =

Hero Hockey India League 2015
Tournament details
- Dates: 22 January – 22 February
- Administrator(s): Hockey India
- Format(s): Double round-robin and Knock-out
- Host(s): India
- Venue(s): 6
- Teams: 6

Final positions
- Champions: Ranchi Rays (1st title)
- Runner-up: Punjab Warriors
- Third Place: Delhi Waveriders

Tournament summary
- Matches played: 34
- Goals scored: 139 (4.09 per match)
- Player of the tournament: Ashley Jackson (Ranchi Rays)
- Most goals: Ashley Jackson (12)

The 2015 Hockey India League (known as the Hero Hockey India League for sponsorship reasons), abbreviated as HIL 2015, was the third season of the professional field hockey tournament, Hockey India League. The tournament began on 22 January 2015 with the final on 22 February 2015.

Ranchi Rays and Dabang Mumbai debuted in this season. The prize money for this edition was announced to be 2.5 Crores INR. Ranchi Rays emerged the champions of the season after beating Punjab Warriors in the final.

== Teams ==
Locations of HIL teams

Team	City	Stadium	Capacity
Delhi Waveriders	Delhi	Shivaji Stadium	7,500
Kalinga Lancers	Bhubaneswar	Kalinga Hockey Stadium	6,000
Dabang Mumbai	Mumbai	Mahindra Hockey Stadium	8,250
Punjab Warriors	Chandigarh	Chandigarh Hockey Stadium	13,648
Ranchi Rays	Ranchi	Astroturf Hockey Stadium	5,000
Uttar Pradesh Wizards	Lucknow	Dhyan Chand Astroturf Stadium	10,000

== Results ==
Visitor team →	DWR	KL	DM	PW	RR	UPW
Home team ↓	DWR	KL	DM	PW	RR	UPW
Delhi Waveriders		1–2	3–1	1–3	2–0	3–3
Kalinga Lancers	2–2		2–1	1–3	6–3	0–2
Dabang Mumbai	1–3	2–1		3–3	1–2	1–5
Punjab Warriors	7–0	4–2	3–2		2–3	3–2
Ranchi Rays	2–2	4–0	2–2	3–2		1–0
Uttar Pradesh Wizards	2–2	5–1	3–2	2–1	0–2	

Home team won	Visiting team won	Match drawn

=== League phase ===
Team	Pld	W	D	L	GF	GA	GD	Pts
Punjab Warriors	10	6	1	3	30	19	+11	35
Ranchi Rays	10	6	2	2	22	17	+5	35
Uttar Pradesh Wizards	10	5	2	3	24	16	+8	32
Delhi Waveriders	10	3	4	3	19	23	−4	25
Kalinga Lancers	10	3	1	6	17	26	−9	21
Dabang Mumbai	10	1	2	7	16	27	−11	15
						Qualified for Semi-finals		
						Eliminated		

22 January 2015
19:00

Kalinga Lancers (home team)	6–3	Ranchi Rays
Vila 3'; Archibald 17'; Kanth 18'; Gurjinder 37'; Antil 58'; Khan 60'	Report	Middleton 14'; Jackson 36', 50'

Kalinga Hockey Stadium, Bhubaneswar
Umpires:
Javed Shaikh (IND)
Marcin Grochal (POL)

23 January 2015
15:00

Uttar Pradesh Wizards (home team)	2–2	Delhi Waveriders
Hertzberger 17'; Ramandeep 56'	Report	Edwards 24'; Talwinder 49'

Dhyan Chand Astroturf Stadium, Lucknow
Umpires:
R. V. Raghuprasad (IND)
Francisco Vazquez (ESP)

23 January 2015
19:00

Dabang Mumbai (home team)	3–3	Punjab Warriors
Harmanpreet 7'; Chinglensana 50', 60'	Report	Dwyer 32'; Sandeep 56', 59'

Mahindra Hockey Stadium, Mumbai
Umpires:
Javed Shaikh (IND)
Grant Hundley (USA)

24 January 2015
19:00

Dabang Mumbai (home team)	1–2	Ranchi Rays
Boon 39'	Report	Middleton 40', 44'

Mahindra Hockey Stadium, Mumbai
Umpires:
Ripudaman Sharma (IND)
Marcin Grochal (POL)

25 January 2015
19:00

Punjab Warriors (home team)	4–2	Kalinga Lancers
Dwyer 27', 28'; Sandeep 37'; Dharamvir 50'	Report	Upadhyay 8'; Gurjinder 52'

International Hockey Stadium, Mohali
Umpires:
Gurinder Sangha (IND)
German Montes de Oca (ARG)

26 January 2015
19:00

Ranchi Rays (home team)	2–2	Delhi Waveriders
Budgeon 28'; Mandeep 35'	Report	Akashdeep 3'; Mujtaba 27'

Astroturf Hockey Stadium, Ranchi
Umpires:
R. V. Raghuprasad (IND)
Jakub Mejzlik (CZE)

26 January 2015
19:00

Punjab Warriors (home team)	3–2	Uttar Pradesh Wizards
Varun 12'; Sunil 28'; Sandeep 42'	Report	Raghunath 7', 53'

International Hockey Stadium, Mohali
Umpires:
Gurbaj Singh (IND)
David Tomlinson (NZL)

28 January 2015
19:00

Ranchi Rays (home team)	2–2	Dabang Mumbai
Beale 16'; Jackson 37'	Report	Turner 12'; Santa 15'

Astroturf Hockey Stadium, Ranchi
Umpires:
Anil Kumar (IND)
Francisco Vazquez (ESP)

29 January 2015
15:00

Uttar Pradesh Wizards (home team)	5–1	Kalinga Lancers
Raghunath 5'; Uthappa 53' de Voogd 54'; Jolie 55'; Hertzberger 60'	Report	Ford 58'

Dhyan Chand Astroturf Stadium, Lucknow
Umpires:
Ripudaman Sharma (IND)
Marcin Grochal (POL)

30 January 2015
19:00

Delhi Waveriders (home team)	1–3	Punjab Warriors
Akashdeep 3'	Report	Ciriello 50'; Sunil 54'; Yousuf 56'

Dhyan Chand National Stadium, Delhi
Umpires:
Gurinder Sangha (IND)
German Montes de Oca (ARG)

31 January 2015
19:00

Kalinga Lancers (home team)	0–2	Uttar Pradesh Wizards
	Report	de Voogd 13'; Ramandeep 35'

Kalinga Hockey Stadium, Bhubaneswar
Umpires:
R. V. Raghuprasad (IND)
Jakub Mejzlik (CZE)

1 February 2015
17:00

Delhi Waveriders (home team)	3–1	Dabang Mumbai
Norris-Jones 10'; Child 19'; Akashdeep 52'	Report	Halappa 36'

Dhyan Chand National Stadium, Delhi
Umpires:
Javed Shaikh (IND)
Grant Hundley (USA)

1 February 2015
19:00

Kalinga Lancers (home team)	1–3	Punjab Warriors
Gurjinder 24'	Report	Sandeep 42'; Yousuf 50'

Kalinga Hockey Stadium, Bhubaneswar
Umpires:
Anil Kumar (IND)
Jakub Mejzlik (CZE)

3 February 2015
15:00

Uttar Pradesh Wizards (home team)	0–2	Ranchi Rays
	Report	Mitton 13'; Mandeep 42'

Dhyan Chand Astroturf Stadium, Lucknow
Umpires:
Gurinder Sangha (IND)
David Tomlinson (NZL)

4 February 2015
15:00

Uttar Pradesh Wizards (home team)	2–1	Punjab Warriors
Raghunath 7'; Ramandeep 9'	Report	Dwyer 52'

Dhyan Chand Astroturf Stadium, Lucknow
Umpires:
Gurbaj Singh (IND)
German Montes de Oca (ARG)

5 February 2015
19:00

Dabang Mumbai (home team)	1–3	Delhi Waveriders
Harmanpreet 51'	Report	Child 4', 47'; Wilson 59'

Mahindra Hockey Stadium, Mumbai
Umpires:
Anil Kumar (IND)
Grant Hundley (USA)

6 February 2015
19:00

Ranchi Rays (home team)	4–0	Kalinga Lancers
Jackson 11', 32', 41'; Wilson 34'	Report

Astroturf Hockey Stadium, Ranchi
Umpires:
Ripudaman Sharma (IND)
German Montes de Oca (ARG)

7 February 2015
19:00

Punjab Warriors (home team)	7–0	Delhi Waveriders
Sandeep 10', 45', 53'; Sunil 14'; Orchard 34'; Ciriello 47'; Hammond 50'	Report

International Hockey Stadium, Mohali
Umpires:
Javed Shaikh (IND)
David Tomlinson (NZL)

8 February 2015
17:00

Ranchi Rays (home team)	1–0	Uttar Pradesh Wizards
Jackson 18'	Report

Astroturf Hockey Stadium, Ranchi
Umpires:
R. V. Raghuprasad (IND)
Marcin Grochal (POL)

8 February 2015
19:00

Dabang Mumbai (home team)	2–1	Kalinga Lancers
Hayward 18'; Harmanpreet 42'	Report	Khan 42'

Mahindra Hockey Stadium, Mumbai
Umpires:
Gurinder Sangha (IND)
Jakub Mejzlik (CZE)

10 February 2015
19:00

Ranchi Rays (home team)	3–2	Punjab Warriors
Parvinder 13'; Jackson 45'; Minz 51'	Report	Mazzilli 47'; Satbir 49'

Astroturf Hockey Stadium, Ranchi
Umpires:
Gurbaj Singh (IND)
Francisco Vazquez (ESP)

11 February 2015
19:00

Dabang Mumbai (home team)	1–5	Uttar Pradesh Wizards
Hayward 43'	Report	Ramandeep 27'; Nik. Thimmaiah 34' de Voogd 42', 45'; Raghunath 51'

Mahindra Hockey Stadium, Mumbai
Umpires:
Gurinder Sangha (IND)
Grant Hundley (USA)

12 February 2015
19:00

Kalinga Lancers (home team)	2–2	Delhi Waveriders
Vila 3'; Sharma 20'	Report	Hayward 27'; Talwinder 59'

Kalinga Hockey Stadium, Bhubaneswar
Umpires:
Anil Kumar (IND)
Francisco Vazquez (ESP)

13 February 2015
19:00

Kalinga Lancers (home team)	2–1	Dabang Mumbai
Gurjinder 11', 20'	Report	Harmanpreet 36'

Kalinga Hockey Stadium, Bhubaneswar
Umpires:
Gurinder Sangha (IND)
Marcin Grochal (POL)

14 February 2015
19:00

Delhi Waveriders (home team)	2–0	Ranchi Rays
Norris-Jones 26'; Akashdeep 53'	Report

Dhyan Chand National Stadium, Delhi
Umpires:
Ripudaman Sharma (IND)
David Tomlinson (NZL)

15 February 2015
15:00

Uttar Pradesh Wizards (home team)	3–2	Dabang Mumbai
Nit. Thimmaiah 29'; Harjeet 53'; Nik. Thimmaiah 60'	Report	Pillay 8'; Turner 44'

Dhyan Chand Astroturf Stadium, Lucknow
Umpires:
Javed Shaikh (IND)
Jakub Mejzlik (CZE)

15 February 2015
19:00

Delhi Waveriders (home team)	1–2	Kalinga Lancers
Hayward 29'	Report	Zalewski 40'; Ford 49'

Dhyan Chand National Stadium, Delhi
Umpires:
R. V. Raghuprasad (IND)
Grant Hundley (USA)

17 February 2015
19:00

Punjab Warriors (home team)	2–3	Ranchi Rays
Sandeep 9'; Ciriello 15'	Report	Jackson 26', 60', 60'

International Hockey Stadium, Mohali
Umpires:
Gurinder Sangha (IND)
Francisco Vazquez (ESP)

18 February 2015
19:00

Delhi Waveriders (home team)	3–3	Uttar Pradesh Wizards
Hayward 45'; Gohdes 51'; Child 52'	Report	Raghunath 20', 53'; Hertzberger 34'

Dhyan Chand National Stadium, Delhi
Umpires:
Javed Shaikh (IND)
German Montes de Oca (ARG)

19 February 2015
19:00

Punjab Warriors (home team)	3–2	Dabang Mumbai
Whetton 37'; Sandeep 44'; Govers 59'	Report	Catlin 17'; Harmanpreet 53'

International Hockey Stadium, Mohali
Umpires:
R. V. Raghuprasad (IND)
David Tomlinson (NZL)

=== First to fourth place classification ===
Semi-finals
21 February–Dhyan Chand National Stadium, Delhi
Ranchi Rays	1 (8)
Uttar Pradesh Wizards	1 (7)
21 February–Dhyan Chand National Stadium, Delhi
Punjab Warriors	2
Delhi Waveriders	0

Final
22 February–Dhyan Chand National Stadium, Delhi
Ranchi Rays	2 (3)
Punjab Warriors	2 (2)
Third place
23 February–Dhyan Chand National Stadium, Delhi
Uttar Pradesh Wizards	1
Delhi Waveriders	2

==== Semi-finals ====
21 February 2015
17:30

Ranchi Rays	1–1	Uttar Pradesh Wizards
Jackson 41'	Report	Raghunath 34'
Penalties
Jackson (penalty shoot-out scored); Lakra (penalty shoot-out missed); Beale (penalty shoot-out scored); Manpreet (penalty shoot-out missed); Middleton (penalty shoot-out scored); Jackson (penalty shoot-out scored); Beale (penalty shoot-out scored); Middleton (penalty shoot-out scored); Jackson (penalty shoot-out missed); Lakra (penalty shoot-out missed); Jackson (penalty shoot-out scored); Beale (penalty shoot-out scored)	8–7	(penalty shoot-out scored) Hertzberger; (penalty shoot-out scored) Baart; (penalty shoot-out missed) Ramandeep; (penalty shoot-out missed) de Voogd; (penalty shoot-out missed) Uthappa; (penalty shoot-out scored) Hertzberger; (penalty shoot-out scored) Baart; (penalty shoot-out scored) de Voogd; (penalty shoot-out missed) Uthappa; (penalty shoot-out scored) Ramandeep; (penalty shoot-out scored) Hertzberger; (penalty shoot-out missed) Baart

Dhyan Chand National Stadium, Delhi
Umpires:
R. V. Raghuprasad (IND)
Marcin Grochal (POL)

21 February 2015
20:00

Punjab Warriors	2–0	Delhi Waveriders
Sandeep 3'; Mazzili 35'	Report

Dhyan Chand National Stadium, Delhi
Umpires:
Javed Shaikh (IND)
German Montes de Oca (ARG)

==== Third and fourth place ====
22 February 2015
17:30

Uttar Pradesh Wizards	1–2	Delhi Waveriders
Nik. Thimmaiah 18'	Report	Rupinder 6'; Walmiki 50'

Dhyan Chand National Stadium, Delhi
Umpires:
R. V. Raghuprasad (IND)
David Tomlinson (NZL)

==== Final ====
22 February 2015
20:00

Ranchi Rays	2–2	Punjab Warriors
Minz 42'; Middleton 57'	Report	Govers 39'; Ciriello 56'
Penalties
Jackson (penalty shoot-out scored); Lakra (penalty shoot-out missed); Beale (penalty shoot-out missed); Jackson (penalty shoot-out scored)	3–2	(penalty shoot-out missed) Orchard; (penalty shoot-out scored) Ciriello; (penalty shoot-out scored) Dharamvir; (penalty shoot-out missed) Sunil; (penalty shoot-out missed) Hammond

Dhyan Chand National Stadium, Delhi
Umpires:
Javed Shaikh (IND)
Francisco Vazquez (ESP)

== See also ==
- List of Hockey India League players
- World Series Hockey
