= 2014 Hockey India League players' auction =

2014 Hockey India League Players' Auction or HIL Closed Bid was the mini auction/closed bid of players for the second season of the professional field hockey tournament, Hockey India League. The auction took place on 22 November at Lalit Hotel in New Delhi.

A total of 154 players were auctioned out of which 95 were Indian players and 59 were foreign players from 14 countries. The base price for the players varied from US$2,600 to US$25,000. The salary cap available to each franchise for the auction was increased from US$650,000 (₹4 crores) to US$725,000 (₹4.46 crores) as per the requests of the franchises. The players were signed for the term of two years. During the closed bid, Kalinga Lancers, the new franchise of the Hockey India League, bought its 24 players while rest of the five franchises bought players due to the permanent withdrawals to complete their squads.

== Transfers ==
Transfer window for second season of HIL was open from 19 August to 30 September.

Player	From	To
(India) Sandeep Singh	Mumbai Magicians	Punjab Warriors
(India) Satbir Singh	Mumbai Magicians	Punjab Warriors

== Withdrawals ==
Permanent withdrawals
Player	Team
(New Zealand) Andrew Hayward	Delhi Waveriders
(India) Anup Valmiki	Mumbai Magicians
(New Zealand) Dean Couzins	Delhi Waveriders
(India) Jonny Jasrotia	Mumbai Magicians
(India) Gagandeep Singh	Mumbai Magicians
(India) Hans Raj	Delhi Waveriders
(India) Keshav Dutt	Punjab Warriors
(Australia) Liam de Young	Mumbai Magicians
(India) Nilakanta Sharma	Punjab Warriors
(Germany) Oskar Deecke	Delhi Waveriders
(India) P.L. Thimmanna	Uttar Pradesh Wizards
(India) P.T. Rao	Mumbai Magicians
(India) Pradhan Somanna	Uttar Pradesh Wizards
(India) Sanjay Kumar Bir	Mumbai Magicians
(India) Sukhdev Singh	Punjab Warriors
(India) Ranjit Singh	Punjab Warriors
(India) Rocky Lohchab	Uttar Pradesh Wizards
(Spain) Roger Padrós	Punjab Warriors
(Netherlands) Tim Jenniskens	Delhi Waveriders
(India) Vivek Dhar	Uttar Pradesh Wizards

Players released
Player	Team
(Australia) Glenn Simpson	Mumbai Magicians
(Australia) Jason Wilson	Mumbai Magicians
(India) Khadangbam Rinel Singh	Ranchi Rhinos
(India) Lovedeep Singh	Delhi Waveriders
(Australia) Russell Ford	Punjab Warriors
(New Zealand) Steven Edwards	Mumbai Magicians
(India) Tarandeep Singh	Ranchi Rhinos

== Auction ==
Following is the list of players bought in the auction:

Player	Team	Base Price	Winning Bid
(England) Barry Middleton	Ranchi Rhinos	$25,000	$53,000
(Australia) Kiel Brown	Kalinga Lancers	$25,000	$55,000
(Argentina) Lucas Vila	Kalinga Lancers	$25,000	$50,000
(New Zealand) Ryan Archibald	Kalinga Lancers	$25,000	$71,000
(Australia) Jason Wilson	Delhi Waveriders	$20,000	$41,000
(Argentina) Gonzalo Peillat	Kalinga Lancers	$20,000	$49,000
(Australia) Russell Ford	Kalinga Lancers	$20,000	$35,000
(England) Simon Mantell	Mumbai Magicians	$20,000	$26,000
(New Zealand) Steve Edwards	Delhi Waveriders	$20,000	$26,000
(Australia) Trent Mitton	Mumbai Magicians	$20,000	$59,000
(Argentina) Agustín Mazzilli	Punjab Warriors	$18,500	$19,000
(England) Adam Dixon	Mumbai Magicians	$18,000	$41,000
(Australia) Glenn Simpson	Kalinga Lancers	$15,000	$33,000
(Australia) Jacob Whetton	Punjab Warriors	$15,000	$19,000
(Spain) Roc Oliva	Kalinga Lancers	$15,000	$38,000
(Australia) Tristan Clemons	Kalinga Lancers	$15,000	$20,000
(Australia) Tristan White	Delhi Waveriders	$15,000	$27,000
(Spain) Ramón Alegre	Kalinga Lancers	$14,000	$41,000
(India) Bharat Chikara	Mumbai Magicians	$12,000	$32,000
(India) Prabodh Tirkey	Kalinga Lancers	$12,000	$25,000
(India) Prabhjot Singh	Mumbai Magicians	$11,200	$46,000
(Australia) Aran Zalewski	Kalinga Lancers	$10,000	$28,000
(Ireland) David Harte	Mumbai Magicians	$10,000	$11,000
(India) Mandeep Antil	Kalinga Lancers	$6,900	$11,000
(India) Vikas Sharma	Kalinga Lancers	$6,900	$15,000
(India) V.S. Vinaya	Mumbai Magicians	$6,000	$40,000
(India) Ravipal Singh	Mumbai Magicians	$5,200	$40,000
(India) Vikram Kanth	Kalinga Lancers	$5,200	$8,000
(South Africa) Timothy Drummond	Delhi Waveriders	$5,000	$18,000
(India) Affan Yousuf	Punjab Warriors	$2,600	$35,000
(India) Armaan Qureshi	Delhi Waveriders	$2,600	$6,000
(India) David Minz	Kalinga Lancers	$2,600	$6,000
(India) Devinder Walmiki	Kalinga Lancers	$2,600	$15,000
(India) Dipsan Tirkey	Kalinga Lancers	$2,600	$6,000
(India) Gagandeep Singh	Mumbai Magicians	$2,600	$3,500
(India) Gagandeep Singh Banwait	Kalinga Lancers	$2,600	$11,000
(India) Gurjinder Singh	Mumbai Magicians	$2,600	$56,000
(India) Harjot Singh	Kalinga Lancers	$2,600	$12,000
(India) Harmanpreet Singh Bal	Uttar Pradesh Wizards	$2,600	$3,000
(India) Jasbir Singh	Kalinga Lancers	$2,600	$15,000
(India) Jasjit Singh Kular	Uttar Pradesh Wizards	$2,600	$3,000
(India) Karamjit Singh	Punjab Warriors	$2,600	$3,500
(India) Lalit Kumar Upadhyay	Kalinga Lancers	$2,600	$14,000
(India) Manjeet Kullu	Kalinga Lancers	$2,600	$12,000
(India) Mohammed Amir Khan	Kalinga Lancers	$2,600	$10,000
(India) Mohammed Nizamuddin	Kalinga Lancers	$2,600	$10,000
(India) Nikkin Thimmaiah	Uttar Pradesh Wizards	$2,600	$59,000
(India) Ramandeep Singh	Uttar Pradesh Wizards	$2,600	$81,000
(India) Vikas Pillay	Mumbai Magicians	$2,600	$30,000

== Replacement signings ==
Franchises can sign players after the HIL auction, as replacement of contracted players who are not available to play due to injuries and national commitments. Under HIL rules, the replacements have to be chosen from the pool of players who went unsold in the auction.

Player	Replaced	Team	Reason for replacement
(Spain) Marc Salles Esteve	(Australia) Fergus Kavanagh	Ranchi Rhinos	
(Spain) Eduard Arbós	(New Zealand) Nicholas Wilson	Ranchi Rhinos	Injury
(New Zealand) Hamish McGregor	(Netherlands) Pirmin Blaak	Delhi Waveriders	
(India) Rajpal Singh	(India) Gurwinder Singh Chandi	Delhi Waveriders	Ankle injury
(India) Gurpreet Singh Guri	(India) Vikramjit Singh	Delhi Waveriders	
(New Zealand) Hugo Inglis	(Netherlands) Jeroen Hertzberger	Uttar Pradesh Wizards	
(England) Iain Lewers	(Netherlands) Marcel Balkestein	Uttar Pradesh Wizards	
(New Zealand) Shea McAleese	(Netherlands) Wouter Jolie	Uttar Pradesh Wizards	
(England) Mark Gleghorne	(Australia) Matthew Swann	Mumbai Magicians	
(Malaysia) Razie Rahim	(Australia) Matthew Butturini	Mumbai Magicians	
(India) Arjun Halappa	(India) Rahul Shilpkar	Delhi Waveriders	
(India) Vikram Vishnu Pillay	(India) Bipin Kishor Kerketta	Delhi Waveriders	
(India) Varun Kumar	(India) Ignace Tirkey	Punjab Warriors	

== Unsold players ==
Following unsold players were added to the reserve pool (according to their base price):

- $25,000
  - (South Korea) Seo Jong-Ho
  - (England) George Pinner
- $22,000
  - (Argentina) Juan Martín López
- $20,000
  - (Czech Republic) Filip Neusser
- $18,000
  - (Spain) Gabriel Dabanch
- $15,000
  - (Australia) Andrew Charter
  - (Malaysia) Azlan Misron
  - (South Africa) Clinton Panther
  - (Malaysia) Firhan Ashaari
  - (Malaysia) Fitri Saari
  - (Argentina) Guillermo Schickendantz
  - (Argentina) Juan Ignacio Gilardi
  - (Argentina) Juan Manuel Vivaldi
  - (Germany) Oliver Korn
  - (South Africa) Rhett Halkett
- $12,000
  - (India) Deepak Thakur
  - (India) Didar Singh
  - (India) Syed Muhammad Zaheer
- $10,000
  - (New Zealand) Arun Panchia
  - (Canada) Jagdish Singh Gill
  - (Canada) Mark Pearson
  - (South Africa) Miguel Da Graca
  - (South Africa) Rassie Pieterse
  - (Argentina) Satiago Miguel Montelli
  - (South Africa) Thornton McDade
- $7,500
  - (Argentina) Guido Martin Barreiros Lopez
- $7,000
  - (India) Inderjeet Singh
- $6,000
  - (India) Baljit Singh
- $5,200
  - (India) Ajmer Singh
  - (India) Prabhdeep Singh Powar
- $5,000
  - (Italy) Ignacio Jose Manes
  - (Italy) Ignacio Santiago Salas
  - (Argentina) Juan Tubio
  - (South Africa) Julian Allen Hykes
  - (Argentina) Marcos Tubio
  - (Italy) Martin Zalatel
  - (Argentina) Pedro Budeisky
- $2,600
  - (India) Abhinav Kumar Pandey
  - (India) Aiyappa Ranjan Paradanda
  - (India) Anand Lakra
  - (India) Arumugam Subramani
  - (India) Arun Rawat
  - (India) Baljit Singh
  - (India) Biddappa K.D.
  - (India) Birsu Bhengra
  - (India) Captain Singh
  - (India) Dayananda Singh Chanamthabam
  - (India) Deepak Kishor Ekka
  - (India) Gurpreet Singh
  - (India) Gurvinder Singh
  - (India) Harmandeep Singh
  - (India) Harmanpreet Singh
  - (India) Harpreet Singh
  - (India) Jagdeep Dayal
  - (India) Jaspreet Singh Rehal
  - (India) Jitender Saroha
- $2,600
  - (India) Joga Singh
  - (India) Lovedeep Singh
  - (India) Lovepreet Singh
  - (India) Manish Bishnoi
  - (India) Manikanta Venkatesshwarlu
  - (India) Manish Sharma
  - (India) Manish Yadav
  - (India) Manjinder Singh Boparai
  - (India) Mohammed Riyazuddin
  - (India) Mohan Muthanna Bollachanda
  - (India) Mohit Singh Thakur
  - (India) Mucketira Gannapathy Poonacha
  - (India) Muddappa Kariappa Maletira
  - (India) Nadeem Uddin
  - (India) Nanak Singh
  - (India) Narinder Pal Singh Dhillon
  - (India) Naveen Antil
  - (India) Naveen Kumar Prasad
  - (India) Nikhil Saroha
  - (India) Owais Ahmed
  - (India) Prabhjot Singh Jr,
  - (India) Pradeep Raj Kumar
  - (India) Raju Pal
  - (India) Rana Pratap
  - (India) Rinel Singh Khadangbam
  - (India) Sagar Harale
  - (India) Sandeep Kumar Singh
  - (India) Sanjay Paswan
  - (India) Sanjib Dung Dung
  - (India) Sarin Edavakath
  - (India) Simranjit Singh Chahal
  - (India) Subodh Tirkey
  - (India) Sumit Chauhan
  - (India) Tarandeep Singh
  - (India) Vikas Choudhary
