= List of 2014 Hockey India League team rosters =

The 2014 Hockey India League (known as the Hero Hockey India League for sponsorship reasons), abbreviated as HIL 2014, is the second season of the professional field hockey tournament, Hockey India League. The season will see the addition of one new franchise, Kalinga Lancers, making a total of six franchises in the league.

== Delhi Waveriders ==
Delhi Waveriders
Player	Nationality	Matches	Goals
Goal Keepers
Gurpreet Singh Guri	India		–
Hamish McGregor	New Zealand	2	–
Nicolas Jacobi	Germany	2	–
Forwards
Armaan Qureshi	India	1	
Akashdeep Singh	India	4	
Danish Mujtaba	India	4	1
Imran Khan	India	1	
Jason Wilson	Australia	4	2
Lloyd Norris-Jones	South Africa	3	1
Matthew Gohdes	Australia	4	1
Simon Child	New Zealand	3	
Rajpal Singh	India	3	
Talwinder Singh	India	4	1
Yuvraj Valmiki	India	1	
Mid-fielders
Andrés Mir	Spain	4	
Arjun Halappa	India	4	
Gurbaj Singh	India	4	
Sardar Singh (Captain)	India	4	
Timothy Drummond	South Africa	4	
Vikram Vishnu Pillay	India	4	
Defenders
Rupinder Pal Singh	India	4	3
Steve Edwards	New Zealand	4	
Surender Kumar	India	3	
Tristan White	Australia	4	
Coach: Cedric D'Souza; Manager: Ajit Pal Singh

== Kalinga Lancers ==
Kalinga Lancers
Player	Nationality	Matches	Goals			
Goal Keepers
Harjot Singh	India	10	–	0	0	0
Tristan Clemons	Australia	5	–	0	0	0
Forwards
Gagandeep Singh Banwait	India	8	2	0	0	0
Lalit Kumar Upadhyay	India	10	1	1	0	0
Lucas Vila	Argentina	8	4	0	0	0
Mandeep Antil	India	7	2	1	0	0
Mohammed Amir Khan	India	9	0	1	2	0
Mohammed Nizamuddin	India	5	1	0	0	0
Russell Ford	Australia	8	0	0	0	0
Mid-fielders
David Minz	India	4	0	0	0	0
Devinder Walmiki	India	5	0	1	0	0
Glenn Simpson	Australia	10	0	0	1	0
Jasbir Singh	India	3	0	0	0	0
Kiel Brown	Australia	8	1	1	0	0
Manjeet Kullu	India	6	0	0	0	0
Prabodh Tirkey	India	10	0	1	0	0
Roc Oliva	Spain	10	0	2	0	0
Ryan Archibald	New Zealand	10	1	1	0	0
Vikas Sharma	India	10	0	0	0	0
Vikram Kanth	India	10	0	1	0	0
Defenders
Aran Zalewski	Australia	9	2	0	0	0
Dipsan Tirkey	India	9	0	0	0	0
Gonzalo Peillat	Argentina	10	8	0	0	0
Ramón Alegre	Spain	10	0	1	0	0
Coach: Terry Walsh; Manager: Ajay Kumar Bansal

== Mumbai Magicians ==
Mumbai Magicians
Player	Nationality	Matches	Goals
Goal Keepers
David Harte	Ireland	1	–
P. R. Shreejesh (captain)	India	1	–
Forwards
Adam Dixon	England	2	
Bharat Chikara	India	2	
Faizal Saari	Malaysia	1	
Glenn Turner	Australia	1	1
K. Chinglensana Singh	India	2	
Mark Gleghorne	England	1	1
Prabhjot Singh	India		
Sarvanjit Singh	India	2	1
Simon Mantell	England	2	
Mid-fielders
M.B. Aiyappa	India	2	
Ravipal Singh	India	2	1
Razie Rahim	Malaysia	2	
Suresh Toppo	India	1	
Timothy Deavin	Australia	2	
Trent Mitton	Australia	2	
Vikas Pillay	India	2	
V.S. Vinaya	India	2	1
Defenders
Chandan Singh	India		
Gagandeep Singh	India	2	
Gurjinder Singh	India	2	1
Joel Carroll	Australia	2	
Sampath Kumar Maylaram	India		
Coach: Maharaj Krishan Kaushik; Manager: Graham Reid

== Punjab Warriors ==
Punjab Warriors
Player	Nationality	Matches	Goals
Goal Keepers
Bharat Chettri	India	2	–
Jaap Stockmann	Netherlands	4	–
Forwards
Affan Yousuf	India	4	2
Dharamvir Singh	India	4	2
Gaganpreet Singh	India	1	
Jacob Whetton	Australia	2	
Jamie Dwyer (Captain)	Australia	4	1
Jarmanpreet Singh	India	2	
Karamjit Singh	India	2	
Kieran Govers	Australia	3	
Malak Singh	India	4	1
Satbir Singh	India	4	1
Shivendra Singh	India	3	1
S.V. Sunil	India	3	
Mid-fielders
Agustín Mazzilli	Argentina	3	1
Gurinder Singh	India	3	
Gurmail Singh	India	3	
Lucas Rey	Argentina	4	1
Robert Hammond	Australia	4	
Simon Orchard	Australia	4	1
Defenders
Christopher Ciriello	Australia	4	1
Mark Knowles	Australia	4	
Sandeep Singh	India	4	4
Varun Kumar	India	3	
Coach: Barry Dancer; Manager: Jagbir Singh

== Ranchi Rhinos ==
Ranchi Rhinos
Player	Nationality	Matches	Goals
Goal Keepers
Francisco Cortés Juncosa	Spain	2	–
Sushant Tirkey	India		–
Forwards
Amon Mirash Tirkey	India	2	
Eduard Arbós	Spain	1	
Floris Evers	Netherlands	2	
Mandeep Singh	India	2	1
Prabhdeep Singh	India	2	
Stanli Victor Minz	India	2	
Sukhmanjit Singh	India	2	
Vikas Choudhary	India	1	
Midfielders
Arvind Kujur	India	1	
Ashley Jackson	England	2	1
Austin Smith	South Africa	2	
Barry Middleton	England	2	
Birendra Lakra	India	2	
Kothajit Singh	India	2	
Manpreet Singh	India	2	
Marc Salles	Spain	1	
Moritz Fürste (Captain)	Germany		
Parvinder Singh	India	1	
Defenders
Amit Rohidas	India	2	
Bosco Pérez-Pla	Spain	2	
Justin Reid-Ross	South Africa	2	1
Sumit Topno	India		
Coach: Gregg Clark; Manager: David John

== Uttar Pradesh Wizards ==
Uttar Pradesh Wizards
Player	Nationality	Matches	Goals
Goal Keepers
George Bazeley	Australia	1	–
Kumar Subramaniam	Malaysia	1	–
Sreenivasa Rao Katharu	India		–
Forwards
Harmanpreet Singh Bal	India	1	
Jasjit Singh Kular	India	2	
Hugo Inglis	New Zealand	1	
Malayalan Gunasekar	India	2	
Nikkin Thimmaiah	India	2	1
Nithin Thimmaiah	India		
S.K. Uthappa	India	2	1
Teun de Nooijer	Netherlands	2	
Tushar Khandker	India	2	
Mid-fielders
David Alegre	Spain	2	
Edward Ockenden	Australia	2	
Harjeet Singh	India	2	
Pradeep Mor	India	2	1
Ramandeep Singh	India	2	
Sander Baart	Netherlands	2	
Siddharth Shanker	India	1	1
Shea McAleese	New Zealand	2	
Defenders
Harbir Singh Sandhu	India		
Iain Lewers	England	2	
Luke Doerner	Australia	2	
V.R. Raghunath (captain)	India	2	4
Coach: Roelant Oltmans; Manager: Maneck Kotwal

== See also ==
- Hockey India League
- 2014 Hockey India League
- 2014 Hockey India League players' auction
