= 2014 Hockey India League =

Hero Hockey India League 2014
Tournament details
- Dates: 25 January – 23 February
- Administrator(s): Hockey India
- Format(s): Double round-robin and Knock-out
- Host(s): India
- Venue(s): 6
- Teams: 6

Final positions
- Champions: Delhi Waveriders (1st title)
- Runner-up: Punjab Warriors
- Third Place: Ranchi Rhinos

Tournament summary
- Matches played: 34
- Goals scored: 156 (4.59 per match)
- Player of the tournament: Jaap Stockmann (Punjab Warriors)
- Most goals: Sandeep Singh (Punjab Warriors) (11)
- Attendance: 6,000 in final match

The 2014 Hockey India League (known as the Hero Hockey India League for sponsorship reasons), abbreviated as HIL 2014, is the second season of the professional field hockey tournament, Hockey India League. The tournament begun on 25 January 2014 with the final on 23 February 2014.

The season will see the addition of one new franchise, Kalinga Lancers, making a total of six franchises in the league. Delhi Waveriders won this year title after finishing the second last year.

== Teams ==
Locations of HIL teams

Team	City	Stadium	Capacity
Delhi Waveriders	Delhi	Dhyan Chand National Stadium	16,200
Kalinga Lancers	Bhubaneswar	Kalinga Hockey Stadium	6,000
Mumbai Magicians	Mumbai	Mahindra Hockey Stadium	8,250
Punjab Warriors	Mohali	International Hockey Stadium	13,648
Ranchi Rhinos	Ranchi	Astroturf Hockey Stadium	5,000
Uttar Pradesh Wizards	Lucknow	Dhyan Chand Astroturf Stadium	10,000

== Players' auction ==
A mini-auction was held on 22 November 2013, featuring nearly 154 players from India and around the world, out of which 49 were bought. The base prices for the players varied from USD 2,600 to USD 25,000.

== League progression ==
	League Phase										Playoffs		
Team	1	2	3	4	5	6	7	8	9	10	SF	3/4	F
Delhi Waveriders	5	6	11	12	17	19	24	29	34	39	W		W
Kalinga Lancers	0	0	5	6	7	8	10	11	16	17			
Mumbai Magicians	1	2	3	5	6	6	7	8	13	18			
Punjab Warriors	1	6	11	16	18	23	25	30	35	40	W		L
Ranchi Rhinos	1	6	11	13	18	23	24	24	25	26	L	W	
Uttar Pradesh Wizards	5	10	11	13	15	16	21	26	27	28	L	L	
Note: The total points at the end of each group match are listed.							Win			Loss		Draw	
Note: Click on the points (group matches) or W/L (Playoffs) to see the summary for the match.							Team was eliminated in group stage.						

== Results ==
Visitor team →	DWR	KL	MM	PW	RR	UPW
Home team ↓	DWR	KL	MM	PW	RR	UPW
Delhi Waveriders		5–0	2–1	1–3	1–0	1–1
Kalinga Lancers	3–4		2–1	3–7	4–1	3–4
Mumbai Magicians	3–5	3–2		1–4	0–1	3–5
Punjab Warriors	1–3	3–3	5–3		4–2	2–1
Ranchi Rhinos	1–0	3–2	1–1	2–3		2–3
Uttar Pradesh Wizards	3–4	3–1	2–3	2–2	1–2	

Home team won	Visiting team won	Match drawn

Note: Click on the results to see match summary.

== Schedule ==
All matches' timings according to Indian Standard Time (UTC +5:30)

=== League Phase ===
Team	Pld	W	D	L	GF	GA	GD	Pts
Punjab Warriors	10	7	2	1	34	21	+13	40
Delhi Waveriders	10	7	1	2	26	16	+10	39
Uttar Pradesh Wizards	10	4	2	4	25	23	+2	28
Ranchi Rhinos	10	4	1	5	15	19	–4	26
Mumbai Magicians	10	2	1	7	19	29	–10	18
Kalinga Lancers	10	2	1	7	23	34	–11	17
						Qualified for Semi-finals		
						Eliminated		

25 January 2014
20:00

Punjab Warriors (home team)	1–3	Delhi Waveriders
Yousuf 33'	Report	Talwinder 29'; Wilson 47', 68'

International Hockey Stadium, Mohali
Umpires:
Raghu Prasad (IND)
Gary Simmonds (RSA)

26 January 2014
18:00

Ranchi Rhinos (home team)	2–3	Uttar Pradesh Wizards
Mandeep 4'; Reid Ross 46'	Report	Thimmaiah 9'; Raghunath 51'; Mor 63'

Astroturf Hockey Stadium, Ranchi
Umpires:
Jakub Mejzlik (CZE)
Javed Shaikh (IND)

26 January 2014
20:00

Punjab Warriors (home team)	5–3	Mumbai Magicians
Mazzilli 7'; Malak 30'; Sandeep 40'; Ciriello 47'; Dharamvir 67'	Report	Gleghorne 15'; Ravipal 17'; Vakkaliga 39'

International Hockey Stadium, Mohali
Umpires:
Diego Barbas (ARG)
Raghu Prasad (IND)

27 January 2014
20:00

Ranchi Rhinos (home team)	1–0	Delhi Waveriders
Jackson 63'	Report

Astroturf Hockey Stadium, Ranchi
Umpires:
Jakub Mejzlik (CZE)
Javed Shaikh (IND)

28 January 2014
20:00

Kalinga Lancers (home team)	3–7	Punjab Warriors
Peillat PC'; Antil 60'	Report	Dharamvir 6'; Rey 23'; Sandeep 29', 40'; Yousuf 31'; Orchard 33'; Dwyer 51'

Kalinga Hockey Stadium, Bhubaneswar
Umpires:
Eduardo Lizana (ESP)
Pankaj Tyagi (IND)

29 January 2014
20:00

Mumbai Magicians (home team)	3–5	Uttar Pradesh Wizards
Gurjinder 12'; Turner 18'; Sarvanjit 57'	Report	Raghunath 28', 41', 56'; Shanker 52'; Uthappa 59'

Mahindra Hockey Stadium, Mumbai
Umpires:
Gary Simmonds (RSA)
G.S. Sangha (IND)

30 January 2014
20:00

Delhi Waveriders (home team)	5–0	Kalinga Lancers
Rupinder Pal 13', 29'; Gohdes 21'; Mujtaba 48'; Norris-Jones 53'	Report

Dhyan Chand National Stadium, Delhi
Umpires:
Diego Barbas (ARG)
Ripudaman Sharma (IND)

31 January 2014
20:00

Delhi Waveriders (home team)	1–3	Punjab Warriors
Rupinder Pal 65'	Report	Sandeep 8'; Satbir 64'; Shivendra 66'

Dhyan Chand National Stadium, Delhi
Umpires:
Jakub Majzlik (CZE)
Harsha Vardhan (IND)

1 February 2014
15:00

Uttar Pradesh Wizards (home team)	1–2	Ranchi Rhinos
Ockenden 50'	Report	Jackson 18'; Middleton 26'

Dhyan Chand Astroturf Stadium, Lucknow
Umpires:
Raghu Prasad (IND)
Eduardo Lizana (ESP)

1 February 2014
20:00

Kalinga Lancers (home team)	2–1	Mumbai Magicians
L. Vila 8'; Zalewski 27'	Report	Turner 39'

Kalinga Hockey Stadium, Bhubaneswar
Umpires:
Gary Simmonds (RSA)
Javed Shaikh (IND)

2 February 2014
15:00

Uttar Pradesh Wizards (home team)	2–2	Punjab Warriors
de Nooijer 12'; Uthappa 54'	Report	Whetton 6'; Satbir 50'

Dhyan Chand Astroturf Stadium, Lucknow
Umpires:
Harsha Vardhan (IND)
Eduardo Lizana (ESP)

2 February 2014
20:00

Kalinga Lancers (home team)	3–4	Delhi Waveriders
Vila 22', 57'; Peillat 46'	Report	Rupinder Pal 4'; Child 28', 40'; Halappa 59'

Kalinga Hockey Stadium, Bhubaneswar
Umpires:
Gary Simmonds (RSA)
Pankaj Tyagi (IND)

4 February 2014
20:00

Ranchi Rhinos (home team)	1–1	Mumbai Magicians
Reid-Ross 52'	Report	Mitton 58'

Astroturf Hockey Stadium, Ranchi
Umpires:
Gary Simmonds (RSA)
Javed Shaikh (IND)

5 February 2014
20:00

Delhi Waveriders (home team)	1–1	Uttar Pradesh Wizards
Walmiki 23'	Report	Uthappa 62'

Dhyan Chand National Stadium, Delhi
Umpires:
Diego Barbas (ARG)
Raghu Prasad (IND)

6 February 2014
20:00

Delhi Waveriders (home team)	2–1	Mumbai Magicians
Akashdeep 20'; Walmiki 66'	Report	Turner 49'

Dhyan Chand National Stadium, Delhi
Umpires:
Eduardo Lizana (ESP)
Raghu Prasad (IND)

7 February 2014
20:00

Ranchi Rhinos (home team)	3–2	Kalinga Lancers
Jackson 6'; Fürste 57'; Tirkey 63'	Report	Peillat 32'; Brown 51'

Astroturf Hockey Stadium, Ranchi
Umpires:
Gary Simmonds (RSA)
Ripudaman Sharma (IND)

8 February 2014
15:00

Uttar Pradesh Wizards (home team)	3–4	Delhi Waveriders
Thimmaiah 30'; Raghunath 38'; Nooijer 58'	Report	Talwinder 8'; Rupinder Pal 14'; Child 19', 20'

Dhyan Chand Astroturf Stadium, Lucknow
Umpires:
Raghu Prasad (IND)
Diego Barbas (ARG)

8 February 2014
20:00

Mumbai Magicians (home team)	1–4	Punjab Warriors
Vakkaliga 30'	Report	Sunil 3'; Dharamvir 17'; Yousuf 25'; Sandeep 26'

Mahindra Hockey Stadium, Mumbai
Umpires:
Jakub Mejzlik (CZE)
Javed Shaikh (IND)

9 February 2014
15:00

Uttar Pradesh Wizards (home team)	3–1	Kalinga Lancers
Raghunath 17'; Thimmaiah 41' de Nooijer 70'	Report	Peillat 59'

Dhyan Chand Astroturf Stadium, Lucknow
Umpires:
Raghu Prasad (IND)
Eduardo Lizana (ESP)

9 February 2014
20:00

Mumbai Magicians (home team)	0–1	Ranchi Rhinos
	Report	Reid-Ross 11'

Mahindra Hockey Stadium, Mumbai
Umpires:
Gary Simmonds (RSA)
Javed Shaikh (IND)

11 February 2014
20:00

Punjab Warriors (home team)	3–3	Kalinga Lancers
Ciriello 18'; Whetton 22'; Orchard 50'	Report	Gagandeep 10'; Antil 26'; Archibald 41'

International Hockey Stadium, Mohali
Umpires:
Diego Barbas (ARG)
G.S Sangha (IND)

12 February 2014
20:00

Delhi Waveriders (home team)	1–0	Ranchi Rhinos
Akashdeep 65'	Report

Dhyan Chand National Stadium, Delhi
Umpires:
Gary Simmonds (RSA)
Ripudaman Sharma (IND)

13 February 2014
20:00

Kalinga Lancers (home team)	3–4	Uttar Pradesh Wizards
Upadhyay 23'; Gagandeep 58'; Peillat 62'	Report	Nt. Thimmaiah 8'; Malayalan 17'; Thimmaiah 55'; Khandker 68'

Kalinga Hockey Stadium, Bhubaneswar
Umpires:
Jakub Mejzlik (CZE)
Pankaj Tyagi (IND)

14 February 2014
20:00

Kalinga Lancers (home team)	4–1	Ranchi Rhinos
Zalewski 23'; D. Walmiki 28'; Peillat 33', 70'	Report	Somaiah 45'

Kalinga Hockey Stadium, Bhubaneswar
Umpires:
Jakub Mejzlik (CZE)
Javed Shaikh (IND)

15 February 2014
18:00

Punjab Warriors (home team)	2–1	Uttar Pradesh Wizards
Dwyer 21'; Sandeep 29'	Report	Inglis 35'

International Hockey Stadium, Mohali
Umpires:
Eduardo Lizana (ESP)
Raghu Prasad (IND)

15 February 2014
20:00

Mumbai Magicians (home team)	3–5	Delhi Waveriders
Turner 10', 68'; Deavin 35'	Report	Walmiki 3'; Rajpal 11', 54'; Akashdeep 36'; Rupinder Pal 58'

Mahindra Hockey Stadium, Mumbai
Umpires:
Harsha Vardhan (IND)
Gary Simmonds (RSA)

16 February 2014
18:00

Mumbai Magicians (home team)	3–2	Kalinga Lancers
Turner 17'; Gleghorne 33'; Ravipal 57'	Report	Nizammudin 43'; Vila 58'

Mahindra Hockey Stadium, Mumbai
Umpires:
Javed Shaikh (IND)
Gary Simmonds (RSA)

16 February 2014
20:00

Punjab Warriors (home team)	4–2	Ranchi Rhinos
Sunil 17'; Knowles 34'; Sandeep 55'; Govers 61'	Report	Rohidas 23'; Reid-Ross 29'

International Hockey Stadium, Mohali
Umpires:
Eduardo Lizana (ARG)
G. S. Sangha (IND)

18 February 2014
15:00

Uttar Pradesh Wizards (home team)	2–3	Mumbai Magicians
Nt. Thimmaiah 22'; Raghunath 62'	Report	Gurjinder 31'; Prabhjot 56'; Turner 61'

Dhyan Chand Astroturf Stadium, Lucknow
Umpires:
Gary Simmonds (RSA)
Javed Shaikh (IND)

19 February 2014
20:00

Ranchi Rhinos (home team)	2–3	Punjab Warriors
Fürste 14'; Jackson 40'	Report	Sandeep 21', 52'; Govers 30'

Astroturf Hockey Stadium, Ranchi
Umpires:
Diego Barbas (ESP)
Jakub Mejzlik (CZE)

=== First to fourth place classification ===
Semi-finals
22 February–Astroturf Hockey Stadium, Ranchi
Delhi Waveriders	1
Uttar Pradesh Wizards	0
22 February–Astroturf Hockey Stadium, Ranchi
Punjab Warriors	3
Ranchi Rhinos	2

Final
23 February–Astroturf Hockey Stadium, Ranchi
Delhi Waveriders	3 (3)
Punjab Warriors	3 (1)
Third place
23 February–Astroturf Hockey Stadium, Ranchi
Ranchi Rhinos	1 (3)
Uttar Pradesh Wizards	1 (2)

==== Semi-finals ====
22 February 2014
17:30

Delhi Waveriders	1–0	Uttar Pradesh Wizards
Walmiki 15'	Report

Astroturf Hockey Stadium, Ranchi
Umpires:
Diego Barbas (ARG)
Jakub Mejzlik (CZE)

22 February 2014
20:00

Punjab Warriors	3–2	Ranchi Rhinos
Sandeep 24'; Whetton 55'	Report	Jackson 15'; Evers 58'

Astroturf Hockey Stadium, Ranchi
Umpires:
Gary Simmonds (RSA)
Javed Shaikh (IND)

==== Third and fourth place ====
23 February 2014
17:30

Uttar Pradesh Wizards	1–1	Ranchi Rhinos
Raghunath 15'	Report	Manpreet 30'
Penalties
Baart (penalty shoot-out missed); Alegre (penalty shoot-out missed); Thimmaiah (penalty shoot-out scored); Ockenden (penalty shoot-out scored); Khandker (penalty shoot-out missed)	2–3	(penalty shoot-out scored) Jackson; (penalty shoot-out missed) Manpreet; (penalty shoot-out scored) Fürste; (penalty shoot-out missed) Lakra; (penalty shoot-out scored) del Perez

Astroturf Hockey Stadium, Ranchi
Umpires:
Eduardo Lizana (ARG)
G. S. Sangha (IND)

==== Final ====
23 February 2014
20:00

Punjab Warriors	3–3	Delhi Waveriders
Knowles 2'; Shivendra 45'; Yousuf 48'	Report	Norris-Jones 33'; Sardara 35+'; Walmiki 52'
Penalties
Orchard (penalty shoot-out missed); Dwyer (penalty shoot-out missed); Sardara (penalty shoot-out missed); Hammond (penalty shoot-out scored)	1–3	(penalty shoot-out scored) Gohdes; (penalty shoot-out missed) Rajpal; (penalty shoot-out scored) Child; (penalty shoot-out scored) Edwards

Astroturf Hockey Stadium, Ranchi
Umpires:
Gary Simmonds (RSA)
Javed Shaikh (IND)

== Awards ==
Most Valuable Player	Most Prominent Player	Highest Goal Scorer Team
Jaap Stockmann (Punjab Warriors)	Akashdeep Singh (Delhi Waveriders)	Punjab Warriors (40 in 12 matches)

== Statistics ==
=== Leading Goal Scorers ===
Rank	Player	Team	Goals
1	Sandeep Singh	Punjab Warriors	11
2	Gonzalo Peillat	Kalinga Lancers	8
2	V. R. Raghunath	Uttar Pradesh Wizards	8
4	Glenn Turner	Mumbai Magicians	7
5	Rupinder Pal Singh	Delhi Waveriders	6

=== Hat-tricks ===
Player	For	Against	Result	Report	Venue
V. R. Raghunath	Uttar Pradesh Wizards	Mumbai Magicians	5–3	Match 6	Mumbai– Mahindra Hockey Stadium

=== Clean sheets ===
==== Player ====
Rank	Player	Team	Clean sheets
1	Nicolas Jacobi	Delhi Waveriders	3
2	Francisco Cortés	Ranchi Rhinos	2

=== Scoring ===
- First goal of the season: Talwinder Singh for Delhi Waveriders against Punjab Warriors (25 January 2014)
- Last goal of the season: Yuvraj Walmiki for Delhi Waveriders against Punjab Warriors (23 February 2014)
- Largest winning margin: 5 goals
  - Delhi Waveriders 5–0 Kalinga Lancers (30 January 2014)
- Highest scoring game: 10 goals
  - Kalinga Lancers 3–7 Punjab Warriors (28 January 2014)
- Most goals scored in a match by a single team: 7 goals
  - Kalinga Lancers 3–7 Punjab Warriors (28 January 2014)
- Most goals scored in a match by a losing team: 3 goals
  - Punjab Warriors 5–3 Mumbai Magicians (26 January 2014)
  - Kalinga Lancers 3–7 Punjab Warriors (28 January 2014)
  - Mumbai Magicians 3–5 Uttar Pradesh Wizards (29 January 2014)
  - Kalinga Lancers 3–4 Delhi Waveriders (2 February 2014)
  - Uttar Pradesh Wizards 3–4 Delhi Waveriders (8 February 2014)
  - Kalinga Lancers 3–4 Uttar Pradesh Wizards (13 February 2014)
  - Mumbai Magicians 3–5 Delhi Waveriders (15 February 2014)

==== Team ====
- Most clean sheets: 3
  - Delhi Waveriders
- Fewest clean sheets: 0
  - Kalinga Lancers
  - Mumbai Magicians
  - Punjab Warriors
  - Uttar Pradesh Wizards

=== Discipline ===
Only green and yellow cards were awarded by umpires during the course of the league.

==== Player ====
- Most Green cards: 04
  - V. R. Raghunath (Uttar Pradesh Wizards)
- Most Yellow cards: 02
  - Mohammed Amir Khan (Kalinga Lancers)
  - Lloyd Norris-Jones (Delhi Wave Riders)
  - Tristan White (Delhi Wave Riders)

==== Team ====
- Green cards:
  - Punjab Warriors: 16
  - Kalinga Lancers: 11
  - Mumbai Magicians: 10
  - Uttar Pradesh Wizards: 10
  - Delhi Wave Riders: 9
  - Ranchi Rhinos: 8
- Yellow cards:
  - Delhi Wave Riders: 7
  - Punjab Warriors: 6
  - Uttar Pradesh Wizards: 5
  - Ranchi Rhinos: 4
  - Kalinga Lancers: 3
  - Mumbai Magicians: 3

== See also ==
- List of Hockey India League players
- World Series Hockey
