= 2013 Hockey India League =

Hero Hockey India League 2013

Tournament details
- Dates: 14 January – 10 February
- Administrator(s): Hockey India
- Format(s): Triple Round-robin and Knock-out
- Host(s): India
- Venue(s): 5
- Teams: 5

Final positions
- Champions: Ranchi Rhinos (1st title)
- Runner-up: Delhi Waveriders
- Third Place: Uttar Pradesh Wizards

Tournament summary
- Matches played: 34
- Goals scored: 147 (4.32 per match)
- Player of the tournament: Sardar Singh (DWR)
- Most goals: Sandeep Singh (MM) (11)

2013 Hockey India League, known as Hero Hockey India League and abbreviated as HIL 2013 was the first season of the field hockey tournament Hockey India League. Tournament was scheduled to start from 5 January to 3 February but was postponed to 14 January to 10 February.

== Rules ==
Five teams took part in the tournament and each team played three matches against each team, one at their home venue and one at the venue of the opposition team. The third match was played against the other four teams two at home and two away.

The points in the league phase of the tournament were awarded as follows:

Points
Results	Points
Win	5 points
Draw	2 points
Loss with goal difference of 2 or less goals	1 points
Loss with goal difference of 3 or more goals	0 points

If at the end of the League two or more teams had the same number of points for any place, these teams would be ranked according to the following order:

1. respective number of matches won;
2. respective goal difference (goals for less goals against). A positive goal difference always takes precedence over a negative one;
3. respective number of goals scored;
4. the cumulative results of the two matches played between those two teams taking firstly the points won in the two matches, secondly the goal difference, and thirdly the number of goals scored
Locations of 2012 Hockey India League teams

== Venues ==
Five venues have been selected for Hockey India League which will serve as home grounds for each franchise:

Team	City	Stadium	Capacity
Delhi Waveriders	Delhi	Dhyan Chand National Stadium	20,000
Mumbai Magicians	Mumbai	Mahindra Hockey Stadium	8,250
Punjab Warriors	Jalandhar	Surjit Hockey Stadium	8,000
Ranchi Rhinos	Ranchi	Birsa Munda Hockey Stadium	5,000
Uttar Pradesh Wizards	Lucknow	Dhyan Chand Astroturf Stadium	10,000

The semi-final, third and fourth place playoff and the final of 2013 HIL were played on 9 and 10 February at Astroturf Hockey Stadium in Ranchi.

== Players ==
The players' auction for first season of HIL took place on 16 December in New Delhi. A total of 246 players were available for the auction out of which 120 players were bought by the franchises which included 50 foreign and 70 local players.

== League progression ==
	League Phase												Playoffs		
Team	1	2	3	4	5	6	7	8	9	10	11	12	SF	3/4	F
Delhi Wave Riders	5	10	12	17	22	27	32	34	39	44	49	49	W		L
Mumbai Magicians	1	2	3	4	5	6	7	12	13	14	15	16			
Punjab Warriors	1	2	3	8	10	15	20	20	25	27	28	29	L	L	
Ranchi Rhinos	5	10	11	12	17	22	27	29	29	31	36	41	W		W
Uttar Pradesh Wizards	5	7	12	14	15	16	17	17	22	22	27	32	L	W	
Note: The total points at the end of each group match are listed.								Win			Loss		Draw		
Note: Click on the points (group matches) or W/L (Playoffs) to see the summary for the match.								Team was eliminated in group stage.							

== Schedule ==
All matches' timings according to Indian Standard Time (UTC +05:30)

=== League Phase ===
Team	Pld	W	D	L	GF	GA	GD	Pts
Delhi Wave Riders	12	9	2	1	37	24	+13	49
Ranchi Rhinos	12	7	2	3	26	22	+4	41
Uttar Pradesh Wizards	12	5	2	5	19	22	–3	32
Punjab Warriors	12	4	2	6	25	27	–2	29
Mumbai Magicians	12	1	0	11	20	32	–12	16
						Qualified for Semi-finals		
						Eliminated		

14 January 2013
20:00

Delhi Wave Riders (home team)	2–1	Punjab Warriors
Deecke 14'; Chandi 23'	Report	Padrós 42'

Dhyan Chand National Stadium, New Delhi
Umpires:
Gary Simmonds (RSA)
Raghu Prasad (IND)

16 January 2013
18:00

Punjab Warriors (home team)	1–2	Ranchi Rhinos
Govers 63'	Report	Jackson 43'; Mandeep 50'

Surjeet Hockey Stadium, Jalandhar
Umpires:
Marcello Servetto (ESP)
Gurinder Sangha (IND)

16 January 2013
20:00

Delhi Wave Riders (home team)	2–1	Mumbai Magicians
Rupinder Pal 27'; Norris-Jones 48'	Report	Sandeep 50'

Dhyan Chand National Stadium, New Delhi
Umpires:
Murray Grime (AUS)
Javed Shaikh (IND)

17 January 2013
20:00

Punjab Warriors (home team)	1–2	Uttar Pradesh Wizards
Dwyer 39'	Report	Hertzberger 17'; 59'

Surjeet Hockey Stadium, Jalandhar
Umpires:
Michael Eilmer (AUT)
Ripudaman Sharma (IND)

18 January 2013
20:00

Ranchi Rhinos (home team)	3–1	Mumbai Magicians
Chaudhary 9'; Mandeep 22'; Smith 29'	Report	Chinglensana 45'

Astroturf Hockey Stadium, Ranchi
Umpires:
Gary Simmonds (RSA)
Suresh Thakur Kumar (IND)

19 January 2013
11:30

Uttar Pradesh Wizards (home team)	1–1	Delhi Wave Riders
Raghunath 24'	Report	Child 6'

Dhyan Chand Astroturf Stadium, Lucknow
Umpires:
Marcello Servetto (ESP)
Harsha Vardhan (IND)

20 January 2013
15:00

Uttar Pradesh Wizards (home team)	2–0	Ranchi Rhinos
Hertzberger 47'; Raghunath 60'	Report

Dhyan Chand Astroturf Stadium, Lucknow
Umpires:
Murray Grime (AUS)
Pankaj Tyagi (IND)

20 January 2013
20:00

Mumbai Magicians (home team)	2–4	Punjab Warriors
Satbir 7'; Sandeep 33'	Report	Dharamvir 4', 70'; Dwyer 56'; Ranjit 65'

Mahindra Hockey Stadium, Mumbai
Umpires:
Michael Eilmer (AUT)
Anil Kumar (IND)

21 January 2013
20:00

Mumbai Magicians (home team)	4–6	Delhi Wave Riders
Sandeep 8', 51'; Turner 42'; Wilson 48'	Report	Deecke 14'; Norris-Jones 23'; Mujtaba 25'; Akashdeep 53'; Mir 55'; Child 58'

Mahindra Hockey Stadium, Mumbai
Umpires:
Gary Simmonds (RSA)
Gurinder Sangha (IND)

22 January 2013
20:00

Punjab Warriors (home team)	2–2	Uttar Pradesh Wizards
Shivendra 12'; Malak 28'	Report	Raghunath 24', 35+'

Surjeet Hockey Stadium, Jalandhar
Umpires:
Murray Grime (AUS)
Suresh Thakur Kumar (IND)

23 January 2013
20:00

Ranchi Rhinos (home team)	4–5	Delhi Wave Riders
Reid-Ross 13'; Jackson 46', 64'; Mandeep 60'	Report	Akashdeep 5'; Rupinder Pal 47', 57'; Chandi 51'; Jenniskens 65'

Astroturf Hockey Stadium, Ranchi
Umpires:
Marcello Servetto (ESP)
Ripudaman Sharma (IND)

24 January 2013
18:00

Ranchi Rhinos (home team)	3–1	Uttar Pradesh Wizards
Fürste 27'; Wilson 67'; Jackson 69'	Report	Doerner 53'

Astroturf Hockey Stadium, Ranchi
Umpires:
Michael Eilmer (AUT)
Javed Shaikh (IND)

24 January 2013
20:00

Punjab Warriors (home team)	4–3	Mumbai Magicians
30'; Malak 35'; Sunil 40'; Ford 44'	Report	Sandeep 14'; Turner 54'; 64'

Surjeet Hockey Stadium, Jalandhar
Umpires:
Murray Grime (AUS)
Harsha Vardhan (IND)

26 January 2013
15:00

Uttar Pradesh Wizards (home team)	1–3	Ranchi Rhinos
Hertzberger 68'	Report	Mandeep 58', 67'; Tarandeep 69'

Dhyan Chand Astroturf Stadium, Lucknow
Umpires:
Gary Simmonds (RSA)
Anil Kumar (IND)

26 January 2013
18:00

Delhi Wave Riders (home team)	4–3	Mumbai Magicians
Khan 6'; Norris-Jones 12', 22'; Rupinder Pal 51'	Report	Sandeep 28', 56', 66'

Dhyan Chand National Stadium, New Delhi
Umpires:
Michael Eilmer (AUT)
Pankaj Tyagi (IND)

27 January 2013
15:00

Uttar Pradesh Wizards (home team)	3–4	Punjab Warriors
Alegre 11'; Raghunath 65'; Hertzberger 67'	Report	Sunil 2', 4'; Dwyer 8'; Ciriello 15'

Dhyan Chand Astroturf Stadium, Lucknow
Umpires:
Marcello Servetto (ESP)
Raghu Prasad (IND)

28 January 2013
20:00

Ranchi Rhinos (home team)	2–1	Mumbai Magicians
Jackson 28'; Mandeep 49'	Report	Sandeep 2'

Astroturf Hockey Stadium, Ranchi
Umpires:
Murray Grime (AUS)
Gurinder Sangha (IND)

29 January 2013
20:00

Delhi Wave Riders (home team)	3–0	Punjab Warriors
Akashdeep 13'; Hayward 52'; Child 69'	Report

Dhyan Chand National Stadium, New Delhi
Umpires:
Gary Simmonds (RSA)
Ripudaman Sharma (IND)

30 January 2013
18:00

Mumbai Magicians (home team)	4–0	Uttar Pradesh Wizards
Jasrotia 11'; Wilson 45'; Sandeep 52', 66'	Report

Mahindra Hockey Stadium, Mumbai
Umpires:
Marcello Servetto (ESP)
Javed Shaikh (IND)

30 January 2013
20:00

Delhi Wave Riders (home team)	2–2	Ranchi Rhinos
20'; Walmiki 53'	Report	Reid-Ross 14'; Evers 61'

Dhyan Chand National Stadium, New Delhi
Umpires:
Michael Eilmer (AUT)
Raghu Prasad (IND)

31 January 2013
20:00

Mumbai Magicians (home team)	1–3	Punjab Warriors
De Young 48'	Report	Dharamvir 8'; Hammond 23'; Malak 52'

Mahindra Hockey Stadium, Mumbai
Umpires:
Marcello Servetto (ESP)
Javed Shaikh (IND)

1 February 2013
20:00

Ranchi Rhinos (home team)	2–5	Delhi Wave Riders
Wilson 24'; Manpreet 68'	Report	Chandi 4', 19'; Child 7'; Rupinder Pal 40'; Gurbaj 49'

Astroturf Hockey Stadium, Ranchi
Umpires:
Murray Grime (AUS)
Harsha Vardhan (IND)

2 February 2013
15:00

Uttar Pradesh Wizards (home team)	2–0	Mumbai Magicians
Mor 9'; Shanker 58'	Report

Dhyan Chand Astroturf Stadium, Lucknow
Umpires:
Gary Simmonds (RSA)
Gurinder Sangha (IND)

2 February 2013
20:00

Ranchi Rhinos (home team)	1–1	Punjab Warriors
Mandeep 34'	Report	Malak 14'

Astroturf Hockey Stadium, Ranchi
Umpires:
Javed Shaikh (IND)
Ripudaman Sharma (IND)

3 February 2013
15:00

Uttar Pradesh Wizards (home team)	0–3	Delhi Wave Riders
	Report	Mir 10'; Deecke 17'; Chandi 30'

Dhyan Chand Astroturf Stadium, Lucknow
Umpires:
Gary Simmonds (RSA)
Suresh Thakur Kumar (IND)

4 February 2013
20:00

Punjab Warriors (home team)	2–3	Ranchi Rhinos
Govers 34'; Ciriello 50'	Report	Reid-Ross 52', 69'; Mandeep 62'

Surjeet Hockey Stadium, Jalandhar
Umpires:
Marcello Servetto (ESP)
Harsha Vardhan (IND)

5 February 2013
18:00

Punjab Warriors (home team)	2–3	Delhi Wave Riders
Dharamvir 17'; Ciriello 70'	Report	Rupinder Pal 7'; Deecke 11'; Norris-Jones 23'

Surjeet Hockey Stadium, Jalandhar
Umpires:
Marcello Servetto (ESP)
Gurinder Sangha (IND)

5 February 2013
20:00

Mumbai Magicians (home team)	0–1	Uttar Pradesh Wizards
	Report	Doerner 33'

Mahindra Hockey Stadium, Mumbai
Umpires:
Murray Grime (AUS)
Michael Eilmer (AUT)

7 February 2013
18:00

Delhi Wave Riders (home team)	1–4	Uttar Pradesh Wizards
Hayward 64'	Report	Hertzberger 39'; Uthappa 49'; Pudiyokkada 56'; Malayalan 64'

Dhyan Chand National Stadium, New Delhi
Umpires:
Gary Simmonds (RSA)
Javed Shaikh (IND)

7 February 2013
20:00

Mumbai Magicians (home team)	0–1	Ranchi Rhinos
	Report	Wilson 61'

Mahindra Hockey Stadium, Mumbai
Umpires:
Murray Grime (AUS)
Raghu Prasad (IND)

=== Play-offs ===
Semi-finals
9 February–Astroturf Hockey Stadium, Ranchi
Ranchi Rhinos	4
Uttar Pradesh Wizards	2
9 February–Astroturf Hockey Stadium, Ranchi
Delhi Wave Riders	3
Punjab Warriors	1

Final
10 February–Astroturf Hockey Stadium, Ranchi
Ranchi Rhinos	2
Delhi Wave Riders	1
Third place
10 February–Astroturf Hockey Stadium, Ranchi
Uttar Pradesh Wizards	4
Punjab Warriors	3

==== Semifinals ====
9 February 2013
16:30

Ranchi Rhinos	4–2	Uttar Pradesh Wizards
Mandeep 5', 66'; Wilson 32', 64'	Report	Thimmaiah 16', 54'

Astroturf Hockey Stadium, Ranchi
Umpires:
Marcello Servetto (ESP)
Raghu Prasad (IND)

9 February 2013
20:00

Delhi Wave Riders	3–1	Punjab Warriors
Mir 14'; Rupinder Pal 32'; Norris-Jones 67'	Report	Dwyer 33'

Astroturf Hockey Stadium, Ranchi
Umpires:
Gary Simmonds (RSA)
Javed Shaikh (IND)

==== Third and fourth place ====
10 February 2013
17:00

Uttar Pradesh Wizards	4–3 (a.e.t.)	Punjab Warriors
Raghunath 42', 62', 64', 85'	Report	Knowles 4'; Sunil 8'; Ranjit 39'

Astroturf Hockey Stadium, Ranchi
Umpires:
Michael Eilmer (AUT)
Javed Shaikh (IND)

==== Final ====
10 February 2013
20:00

Ranchi Rhinos	2–1	Delhi Wave Riders
Smith 55'; Manpreet 63'	Report	Child 25'

Astroturf Hockey Stadium, Ranchi
Umpires:
Gary Simmonds (RSA)
Marcello Servetto (ESP)

== Awards ==
Player of the Tournament	Upcoming player of the tournament	Most goals in league phase	Fair play
Sardar Singh (Delhi Waveriders)	Mandeep Singh (Ranchi Rhinos)	Delhi Waveriders (37 in 12 matches)	Ranchi Rhinos

== Statistics ==
=== Leading goalscorers ===
Rank	Player	Team	Matches	Goals
1	Sandeep Singh	Mumbai Magicians	12	11
2	Mandeep Singh	Ranchi Rhinos	13	10
3	V. R. Raghunath	Uttar Pradesh Wizards	14	9
4	Rupinder Pal Singh	Delhi Wave Riders	14	7
5	Lloyd Norris-Jones	Delhi Wave Riders	14	6

=== Hat-tricks ===
Player	For	Against	Result	Report	Venue
Sandeep Singh	Mumbai Magicians	Delhi Wave Riders	3–4	Match 15	New Delhi–Dhyan Chand National Stadium
V.R. Raghunath^{4}	Uttar Pradesh Wizards	Punjab Warriors	4–3	3rd place	Ranchi– Astroturf Hockey Stadium

=== Scoring ===
- First goal of the season: Oskar Deecke for Delhi Waveriders against Punjab Warriors (14 January 2013)
- Last goal of the season: Manpreet Singh for Ranchi Rhinos against Delhi Waveriders (10 February 2013)
- Largest winning margin: 4 goals
  - Mumbai Magicians 4–0 Uttar Pradesh Wizards (30 January 2013)
- Highest scoring game: 10 goals
  - Mumbai Magicians 4–6 Delhi Waveriders (21 January 2013)
- Most goals scored in a match by a single team: 6 goals
  - Mumbai Magicians 4–6 Delhi Waveriders (21 January 2013)
- Most goals scored in a match by a losing team: 4 goals
  - Mumbai Magicians 4–6 Delhi Waveriders (21 January 2013)
  - Ranchi Rhinos 4–5 Delhi Waveriders (23 January 2013)

=== Clean sheets ===
==== Player ====
Rank	Player	Team	Clean sheets
1	George Bazeley	Uttar Pradesh Wizards	3
2	Francisco Juancosa Cortés	Ranchi Rhinos	1
2	Nicolas Jacobi	Delhi Waveriders	1
2	Pirmin Blaak	Delhi Waveriders	1
2	P. R. Shreejesh	Mumbai Magicians	1

==== Team ====
- Most clean sheets: 3
  - Uttar Pradesh Wizards
- Fewest clean sheets: 0
  - Punjab Warriors

=== Discipline ===
==== Player ====
- Most green cards: 4
  - Yuvraj Walmiki (Delhi Waveriders)
- Most yellow cards: 2
  - Manpreet Singh (Ranchi Rhinos)
  - Pradhan Somanna (Uttar Pradesh Wizards)
  - Robert Hammond (Punjab Warriors)
  - Sardara Singh (Delhi Waveriders)
  - Wouter Jolie (Uttar Pradesh Wizards)
- Most red cards: 1
  - Ranjit Singh (Punjab Warriors)

==== Team ====
- Most green cards: 15
  - Delhi Waveriders
- Most yellow cards: 7
  - Mumbai Magicians
  - Punjab Warriors
- Most red cards: 1
  - Punjab Warriors

Source: Hockey India League

== See also ==
- List of Hockey India League players
- World Series Hockey
