= 2011 Men's Hockey Champions Challenge I =

Field hockey tournament

Tournament details
- Host country: South Africa
- City: Johannesburg
- Teams: 8
- Venue: 1

Final positions
- Champions: Belgium (1st title)
- Runner-up: India
- Third place: South Africa

Tournament statistics
- Matches played: 24
- Goals scored: 133 (5.54 per match)
- Top scorer(s): (Belgium) Tom Boon (South Africa) Justin Reid-Ross (8 goals)
- Best player: (India) Sandeep Singh

The 2011 Men's Hockey Champions Challenge was held from 26 November to 4 December 2011 in Johannesburg, South Africa.

This was the sixth edition of the competition initiated by the International Hockey Federation in 2001 to broaden hockey's competitive base globally and featured the 8 teams just behind the top six teams in the world.

Belgium won the tournament for the first time after defeating India 4–3 in the final.

== Teams ==
The FIH announced the eight participating teams on 16 December 2010.

- Argentina
- Belgium
- Canada
- India
- Japan
- Malaysia
- Poland
- South Africa

== Results ==
=== First round ===
All times are South African Time (UTC+02:00)

==== Pool A ====
Pos	Team	Pld	W	D	L	GF	GA	GD	Pts
1	India	3	2	1	0	17	7	+10	7
2	Belgium	3	2	1	0	12	7	+5	7
3	South Africa (H)	3	1	0	2	8	10	−2	3
4	Poland	3	0	0	3	4	17	−13	0

Source: FIH
Rules for classification: 1) points; 2) matches won; 3) goal difference; 4) goals for; 5) head-to-head result; 6) field goals scored.
(H) Hosts

26 November 2011
15:00

India	3–3	Belgium
Rupinder Pal 45'; Chinglensana 48'; Raghunath 57'	Report	de Paeuw 31'; Boon 55'; Reckinger 69'

Umpires:
Roel van Eert (NED)
Chen Dekang (CHN)

26 November 2011
17:00

South Africa	3–1	Poland
Reid-Ross 3', 60'; Norris-Jones 31'	Report	Juszczak 43'

Umpires:
Ged Curran (SCO)
Francisco Vasquez (ESP)

27 November 2011
15:00

Belgium	7–3	Poland
Boon 2', 22', 39', 56'; Gougnard 18'; Briels 23'; Truyens 68'	Report	Poltaszewski 32'; Rataj 40', 61'

Umpires:
Raghu Prasad (IND)
Ayden Shrives (RSA)

27 November 2011
17:00

South Africa	4–7	India
Reid-Ross 7'; Harper 38' da Graca 45'; Drummond 49'	Report	Sandeep 13', 35'; Saravanjit 29'; Khandker 41'; Sunil 55', 57'; Rupinder Pal 56'

Umpires:
Tim Pullman (AUS)
Andrew Kennedy (ENG)

29 November 2011
15:00

India	7–0	Poland
Walmiki 18'; Shivendra 24', 33'; Sunil 43'; Lakra 53'; Khandker 55', 70'	Report

Umpires:
Fernando Gomez (ARG)
Francisco Vasquez (ESP)

29 November 2011
17:00

Belgium	2–1	South Africa
Boon 4'; Dekeyser 30'	Report	Reid-Ross 39'

Umpires:
Ged Curran (SCP)
Roel van Eert (NED)

==== Pool B ====
Pos	Team	Pld	W	D	L	GF	GA	GD	Pts
1	Argentina	3	2	1	0	10	6	+4	7
2	Japan	3	1	2	0	6	5	+1	5
3	Canada	3	1	0	2	6	6	0	3
4	Malaysia	3	0	1	2	5	10	−5	1

Source: FIH
Rules for classification: 1) points; 2) matches won; 3) goal difference; 4) goals for; 5) head-to-head result; 6) field goals scored.

26 November 2011
11:00

Canada	3–1	Malaysia
Tupper 8'; Singh 49'; Smythe 63'	Report	Amin 33'

Umpires:
Ged Curran (SCO)
Gregory Uyttenhove (BEL)

26 November 2011
13:00

Argentina	2–2	Japan
Cammareri 13'; Argento 65'	Report	Nagasawa 54'; Tachibana 63'

Umpires:
Andrew Kennedy (ENG)
Ayden Shrives (RSA)

27 November 2011
11:00

Argentina	3–2	Canada
Cammareri 26'; Vila 39'; Ibarra 54'	Report	Pereira 20'; Wright 31'

Umpires:
Ged Curran (SCO)
Gregory Uyttenhove (BEL)

27 November 2011
13:00

Malaysia	2–2	Japan
Tengku 53'; Amin 68'	Report	Sakamoto 6'; Nagasawa 9'

Umpires:
Roel van Eert (NED)
Fernando Gomez (ARG)

29 November 2011
11:00

Canada	1–2	Japan
Smythe 3'	Report	Kayukawa 30'; Sakamoto 41'

Umpires:
Raghu Prasad (IND)
Gregory Uyttenhove (BEL)

29 November 2011
13:00

Malaysia	2–5	Argentina
Azian 19'; Amin 64'	Report	Ibarra 44', 64', 70'; Mazzilli 51', 58'

Umpires:
Chen Dekang (CHN)
Tim Pullman (AUS)

=== Second round ===
Quarter-finals
1 December
India (a.e.t.)	5
Malaysia	4
1 December
Japan	2
South Africa	3
1 December
Belgium	4
Canada	0
1 December
Argentina	5
Poland	1

Semi-finals
3 December
India	4
South Africa	2
3 December
Belgium (p.s.o.)	2 (3)
Argentina	2 (2)

Final
4 December
India	3
Belgium	4
Third place
4 December
South Africa	3
Argentina	1

==== Quarterfinals ====
1 December 2011
10:00

Belgium	4–0	Canada
van Aubel 23'; Briels 49'; Dekeyser 52'; Boon 59'	Report

Umpires:
Tim Pullman (AUS)
Ayden Shrives (RSA)

1 December 2011
12:30

Argentina	5–1	Poland
Argento 13'; Ibarra 22'; R. Vila 23'; Rossi 56'; L. Vila 68'	Report	Zywiczka 4'

Umpires:
Francisco Vasquez (ESP)
Raghu Prasad (IND)

1 December 2011
15:00

India	5–4 (a.e.t.)	Malaysia
Sandeep 7', 24'; Walmiki 64'; Sunil 67'; Raghunath 85'	Report	Izwan 33'; Azlan 42', 58'; Tengku 46'

Umpires:
Roel van Eert (NED)
Chen Dekang (CHN)

1 December 2011
17:30

Japan	2–3	South Africa
Nagasawa 54'; Shiokawa 57'	Report	Reid-Ross 9', 26', 45'

Umpires:
Andrew Kennedy (ENG)
Ged Curran (SCO)

==== Fifth to eighth place classification ====
Cross-overs
2 December
Malaysia	2
Japan	1
2 December
Canada	2
Poland (a.e.t.)	3

Fifth place
4 December
Malaysia	3
Poland	0
Seventh place
4 December
Japan	7
Canada	2

===== Cross-overs =====
2 December 2011
14:30

Malaysia	2–1	Japan
Faizal 53', 58'	Report	Ozawa 24'

Umpires:
Gregory Uyttenhove (BEL)
Francisco Vazquez (ESP)

2 December 2011
17:00

Canada	2–3 (a.e.t.)	Poland
Smythe 13'; Gill 30'	Report	Mikula 26'; Rataj 33'; Dutkiewicz 73'

Umpires:
Fernando Gomez (ARG)
Ayden Shrives (RSA)

===== Seventh and eighth place =====
4 December 2011
09:00

Japan	7–2	Canada
Kayukawa 7'; Tachibana 23', 49'; Tanaka 26'; Nagasawa 53'; Mitani 59', 60'	Report	Tupper 35'; Wright 67'

Umpires:
Francisco Vazquez (ESP)
Andrew Kennedy (ENG)

===== Fifth and sixth place =====
4 December 2011
11:30

Malaysia	3–0	Poland
Tengku 17', 47'; Faizal 29'	Report

Umpires:
Fernando Gomez (ARG)
Gregory Uyttenhove (BEL)

==== First to fourth place classification ====
===== Semifinals =====
3 December 2011
13:30

Belgium	2–2 (a.e.t.)	Argentina
Thys 33' van Aubel 49'	Report	Ibarra 24'; Mazzilli 32'
Penalties
Gougnard (penalty shoot-out scored) van Aubel (penalty shoot-out missed); Dohmen (penalty shoot-out missed); Briels (penalty shoot-out scored); Dekeyser (penalty shoot-out scored)	3–2	(penalty shoot-out missed) Ibarra; (penalty shoot-out scored) Cammareri; (penalty shoot-out missed) Rey; (penalty shoot-out scored) Brunet; (penalty shoot-out missed) L. Vila

Umpires:
Ged Curran (SCO)
Roel van Eert (NED)

3 December 2011
16:00

India	4–2	South Africa
Raghunath 14'; Saravanjit 40'; Sandeep 45', 50'	Report	Drummond 8'; McDade 22'

Umpires:
Tim Pullman (AUS)
Andrew Kennedy (ENG)

===== Third and fourth place =====
4 December 2011
14:00

South Africa	3–1	Argentina
Reid-Ross 18'; Paton 25'; Norris-Jones 68'	Report	Cammareri 22'

Umpires:
Chen Dekang (CHN)
Raghu Prasad (IND)

===== Final =====
4 December 2011
16:30

India	3–4	Belgium
Raghunath 23'; Sandeep 41'; Shivendra 54'	Report	Dekeyser 44', 57'; Boccard 55'; Boon 70'

Umpires:
Ged Curran (SCO)
Tim Pullman (AUS)

== Awards ==
Top Goalscorer	Best Player	Best Goalkeeper	Fair Play Trophy
(Belgium) Tom Boon (South Africa) Justin Reid-Ross	(India) Sandeep Singh	(Belgium) David van Rysselberghe	South Africa

== Statistics ==
=== Final ranking ===
1. Belgium
2. India
3. South Africa
4. Argentina
5. Malaysia
6. Poland
7. Japan
8. Canada
