= Punjab Warriors =

Field hockey team based in Chandigarh, Punjab

- Full name: Jaypee Punjab Warriors
- Nickname(s): The Warriors
- Founded: 2012
- Home ground: Sector 42 Stadium; Chandigarh (Capacity 30,000)

Personnel
- Owner: Jaypee Group
Home	Away

Jaypee Punjab Warriors was a professional field hockey team based in Chandigarh that played in the Hockey India League. It was owned by the Jaypee Group.

== Franchisee details ==
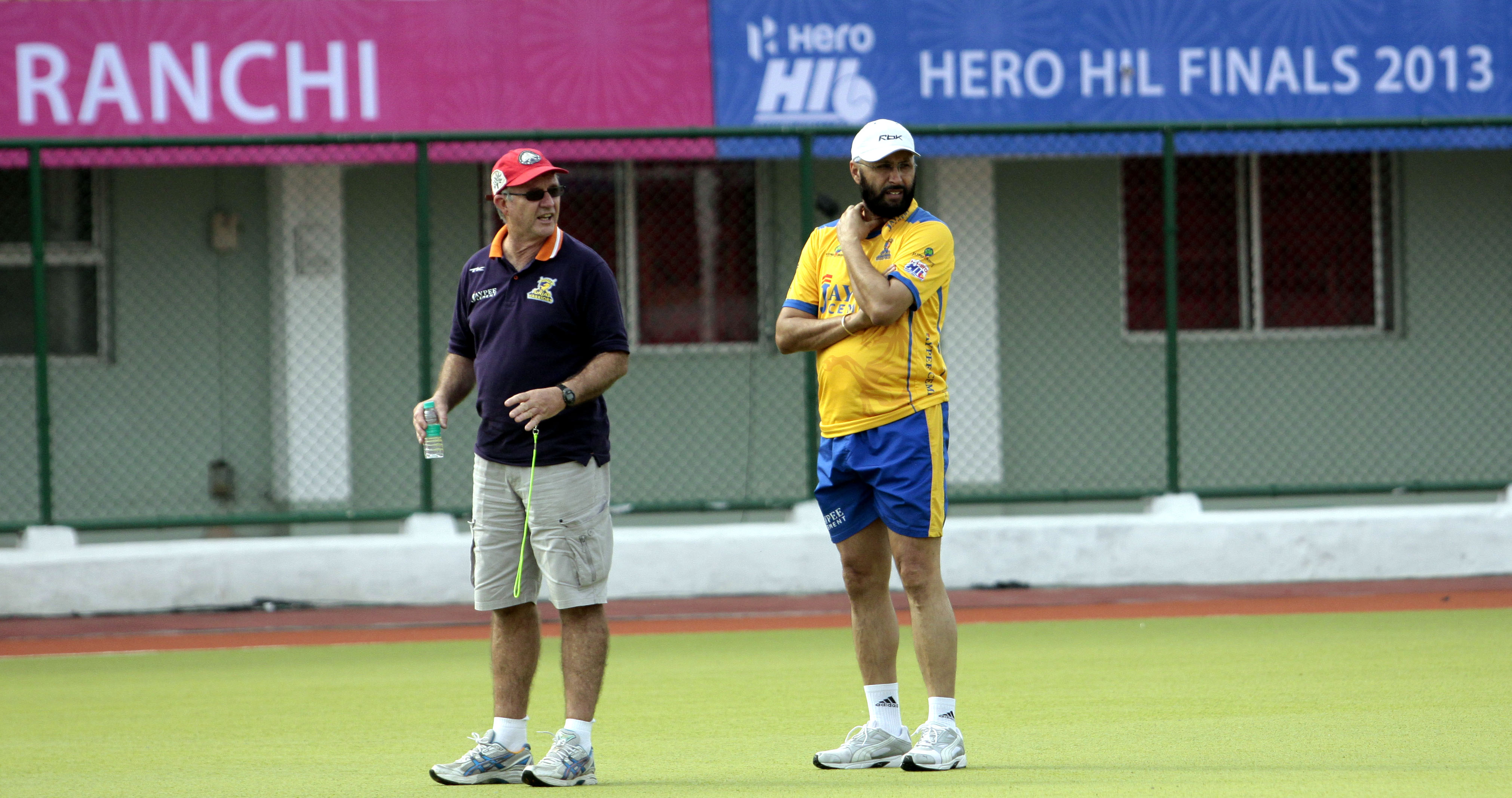
Punjab Warriors' coach Barry Dancer (left) with Jagbir Singh (right).

Jaiprakash Associates Ltd. (JAL) or Jaypee Group is the owner of the franchise.

== 2017 squad ==
Player	Nationality
Goalkeepers
Tristan Clemons	Australia
Jugraj Singh	India
Defenders
Christopher Ciriello	Australia
Mark Knowles	Australia
Varun Kumar	India
Harbir Singh Sandhu	India
Hardik Singh	India
Midfielders
Baljit Singh Boparai	India
Matt Gohdes	Australia
Simon Orchard	Australia
Sardar Singh	India
Robert van der Horst	Netherlands
Forwards
Mark Gleghorne	England
Jasjit Singh Kular	India
Ajit Kumar Pandey	India
Armaan Qureshi	India
Satbir Singh	India
S. V. Sunil	India
Nithin Thimmaiah	India
Jacob Whetton	Australia

== Statistics ==
Season	Matches	Won	Drawn	Lost	Win%
2013	14	4	2	8	28.57%
2014	11	8	2	1	72.73%
Home	11	4	2	5	36.36%
Away	14	8	2	4	57.14%
Overall	25	12	4	9	48.00%

Performance details
Goals for	66 (2.64 per match)
Goals against	57 (2.28 per match)
Most goals	(India) Sandeep Singh

Performance by oppositions
Opposition	Matches	Won	Drawn	Lost	For	Against	Win%
Delhi Waveriders	6	1	0	5	8	15	16.67%
Kalinga Lancers	2	1	1	0	10	6	50.00%
Dabang Mumbai	5	5	0	0	20	10	100.00%
Ranchi Rays	6	3	1	2	14	12	50.00%
Uttar Pradesh Wizards	6	2	2	2	14	14	33.33%

== Fixtures and results ==
=== 2013 ===
No.	Date	Result	Opponent	Venue	Report
1	14 January	1 – 2	Delhi Wave Riders	New Delhi	Match 1
2	16 January	1 – 2	Ranchi Rhinos	Jalandhar	Match 2
3	17 January	1 – 2	Uttar Pradesh Wizards	Jalandhar	Match 4
4	20 January	4 – 2	Mumbai Magicians	Mumbai	Match 8
5	22 January	2 – 2	Uttar Pradesh Wizards	Jalandhar	Match 10
6	24 January	4 – 3	Mumbai Magicians	Jalandhar	Match 13
7	27 January	4 – 3	Uttar Pradesh Wizards	Lucknow	Match 16
8	29 January	0 – 3	Delhi Wave Riders	New Delhi	Match 18
9	31 January	3 – 1	Mumbai Magicians	Mumbai	Match 21
10	2 February	1 – 1	Ranchi Rhinos	Ranchi	Match 24
11	4 February	2 – 3	Ranchi Rhinos	Jalandhar	Match 26
12	5 February	2 – 3	Delhi Wave Riders	Jalandhar	Match 27
13	9 February	1 – 3	Delhi Wave Riders	Ranchi	Semi-final 2
14	10 February	3 – 4 (a.e.t.)	Uttar Pradesh Wizards	Ranchi	3rd place
Position in League Phase: 4th 4th place

- Goals For: 29 (2.07 per match)
- Goals Against: 34 (2.43 per match)
- Most Goals: 4 (Overall: 11th)
  - Dharamvir Singh
  - Jamie Dwyer
  - Malak Singh
  - S. V. Sunil

=== 2014 ===
No.	Date	Result	Opponent	Venue	Report
1	25 January	1 – 3	Delhi Waveriders	Mohali	Match 1
2	26 January	5 – 3	Mumbai Magicians	Mohali	Match 3
3	28 January	7 – 3	Kalinga Lancers	Bhubaneswar	Match 5
4	31 January	3 – 1	Delhi Waveriders	Delhi	Match 8
5	2 February	2 – 2	Uttar Pradesh Wizards	Lucknow	Match 11
6	8 February	4 – 1	Mumbai Magicians	Mumbai	Match 18
7	11 February	3 – 3	Kalinga Lancers	Mohali	Match 21
8	15 February	2 – 1	Uttar Pradesh Wizards	Mohali	Match 25
9	16 February	4 – 2	Ranchi Rhinos	Mohali	Match 28
10	19 February	3 – 2	Ranchi Rhinos	Ranchi	Match 30
11	22 February	3 – 2	Ranchi Rhinos	Ranchi	Semi-final 2
12	23 February	4 – 6 (Penalties)	Delhi Waveriders	Ranchi	Final

=== 2015 ===
No.	Date	Result	Opponent	Venue	Report
1	23 January	3 – 3	Dabang Mumbai	Mumbai	Match 3
2	25 January	4 – 2	Kalinga Lancers	Mohali	Match 5
3	26 January	3 – 2	Uttar Pradesh Wizards	Mohali	Match 7
4	30 January	3 – 1	Delhi Waveriders	New Delhi	Match 10
5	1 February	3 – 1	Kalinga Lancers	Bhubaneswar	Match 13
6	4 February	1 – 2	Uttar Pradesh Wizards	Lucknow	Match 15
7	7 February	7 – 0	Delhi Waveriders	Mohali	Match 18
