= Chinglensana Singh Kangujam =

Indian field hockey player (born 1991)

Chinglensana Singh
Personal information
- Full name: Chinglensana Singh Kangujam
- Born: 2 December 1991 (age 34) Manipur, India
- Height: 1.67 m (5 ft 6 in)

Sport
- Sport: Field hockey
- Position: Halfback
Senior career
Years	Team	Caps	Goals
–	Western Railway	-	-
2013–2014	Mumbai Magicians	22	1
2015–	Dabang Mumbai	4	2
2022	Monarch Padma	-	-
National team
Years	Team	Caps	Goals
2011–	India	207	(14)
Medal record
Men's field hockey
Representing India
Asian Games
Gold medal – first place	2014 Incheon	Team
Bronze medal – third place	2018 Jakarta	Team
Asia Cup
Gold medal – first place	2017 Dhaka
Silver medal – second place	2013 Ipoh
Champions Trophy
Silver medal – second place	2016 London
Silver medal – second place	2018 Breda
World League
Bronze medal – third place	2014–15 Raipur	Team
Bronze medal – third place	2016–17 Bhubaneswar	Team
Asian Champions Trophy
Gold medal – first place	2016 Kuantan
Gold medal – first place	2018 Muscat
Silver medal – second place	2012 Doha
Commonwealth Games
Silver medal – second place	2014 Glasgow	Team

Chinglensana Singh Kangujam (Meitei: Kangujam Chinglensana Singh, born 2 December 1991) is an Indian field hockey player who plays as a halfback. He made his debut in the Indian team in 2012, and plays for Dabang Mumbai in the Hockey India League.

== Career ==
=== International career ===
Singh was named as a stand-by player for the 2011 Champions Trophy in Ordos City, China, and was selected in the main squad following the dropping out of two players. However, he missed out as his passport was not ready at the time. Eventually, he made his debut in 2011, at the Champions Challenge I in South Africa. He was a part of the team that competed at the 2014 Commonwealth Games in Glasgow, finishing second, and a ninth-place finish at the 2014 World Cup. In the same year, he won the gold medal with the team at the Asian Games in Incheon.

=== Club career ===
At the auction of the inaugural season of Hockey India League, Singh was bought by the Mumbai franchise for US$ 22,000. The team named Mumbai Magicians finished fifth in both the first and the second seasons before announcing their withdrawal from the league in September 2014. Singh finished with one goal in the two seasons. Following the Magicians' withdrawal, Singh was signed by the then new team Dabang Mumbai, for the 2015 season.
