= Santa Singh =

Santa Singh may refer to:

- Santa Singh (field hockey) (born 1996), Indian field hockey player
- Jathedar Santa Singh (1928–2008), Nihang and 13th Jathedar of Budha Dal
- Santa Singh (joke), a class of ethnic jokes based on stereotypes of Sikhs
