= Uttar Pradesh Wizards =

Indian field hockey team

- Full name: Uttar Pradesh Wizards
- Nickname(s): UP Wizards
- Founded: 2012
- Dissolved: 2017
- Home ground: Major Dhyan Chand Stadium; Lucknow, Uttar Pradesh, India (Capacity 10,000)

Personnel
- Captain: V.R. Raghunath
- Coach: Roelant Oltmans
- Owner: Sahara India Pariwar; Suresh Raina
- Website: Official website
Home	Away

The Uttar Pradesh Wizards was an Indian professional field hockey team based in Lucknow, Uttar Pradesh that played in the Hockey India League. It was owned by Sahara India.

== Franchise details ==
=== Ownership ===
The team was owned by Sahara Adventure Sports Limited, a group company of Sahara India, starting from 23 July 2012. Sahara India was also the main sponsor of Hockey India. This was the first franchise of Hockey India League to be bought. In December 2014, Suresh Raina became the co-owner of Uttar Pradesh Wizards.

== 2017 squad ==
Player	Nationality
Goalkeepers
Suraj Karkera	India
P. R. Sreejesh	India
Defenders
Wouter Jolie	Netherlands
Gonzalo Peillat	Argentina
V. R. Raghunath	India
Gurinder Singh	India
Nicholas Spooner	South Africa
Arthur van Doren	Belgium
Midfielders
Sander Baart	Netherlands
Agustin Mazzilli	Argentina
Eddie Ockenden	Australia
Vikas Pillay	India
Ajitesh Roy	India
Chinglensana Singh	India
Shamsher Singh	India
Seve van Ass	Netherlands
Forwards
P. R. Aiyappa	India
Akashdeep Singh	India
Ramandeep Singh	India
Ajay Yadav	India

== Statistics ==
Season	Matches	Won	Drawn	Lost	Win%
2013	14	6	2	6	42.86%
2014	12	4	2	6	33.33%
2015	12	5	2	5	41.67%
2016	10	4	0	6	25.00%
2017	12	4	4	4	33.33%
Home	26	8	6	12	30.77%
Away	26	13	4	9	50.00%
Neutral	8	2	0	6	25.00%
Overall	60	23	10	27	50.83%

Performance details
Goals for	50 (2.00 per match)
Goals against	53 (2.12 per match)
Most goals	V. R. Raghunath (16)

Performance by oppositions
Opposition	Matches	Won	Drawn	Lost	For	Against	Win%
Delhi Waveriders	6	1	2	3	9	11	16.67%
Kalinga Lancers	2	2	0	0	7	4	100.00%
Punjab Warriors	6	2	2	2	14	14	33.33%
Mumbai Magicians	5	3	0	2	10	10	60.00%
Ranchi Rhinos	6	2	0	4	10	14	33.33%

=== Hat-tricks ===
No.	Player	Opposition	Result	Season	Venue	Report
1	(India) V. R. Raghunath^{4}	Punjab Warriors	4 – 3	2013	Ranchi – Astroturf Hockey Stadium	10 February 2013
2	(India) V. R. Raghunath	Mumbai Magicians	5 – 3	2014	Mumbai – Mahindra Hockey Stadium	29 January 2014

== Fixtures and results ==
=== 2013 ===
No.	Date	Result	Opponent	Venue	Report
1	17 January	2 – 1	Punjab Warriors	Jalandhar	Match 4
2	19 January	1 – 1	Delhi Wave Riders	Lucknow	Match 6
3	20 January	2 – 0	Ranchi Rhinos	Lucknow	Match 7
4	22 January	2 – 2	Punjab Warriors	Jalandhar	Match 10
5	24 January	1 – 3	Ranchi Rhinos	Ranchi	Match 12
6	26 January	1 – 3	Ranchi Rhinos	Lucknow	Match 14
7	27 January	3 – 4	Punjab Warriors	Lucknow	Match 16
8	30 January	0 – 4	Mumbai Magicians	Mumbai	Match 19
9	2 February	2 – 0	Mumbai Magicians	Lucknow	Match 23
10	3 February	0 – 3	Delhi Wave Riders	Lucknow	Match 25
11	5 February	1 – 0	Mumbai Magicians	Mumbai	Match 28
12	7 February	4 – 1	Delhi Wave Riders	Delhi	Match 29
13	9 February	2 – 4	Ranchi Rhinos	Ranchi	Semi-final 1
14	10 February	4 – 3 (a.e.t.)	Punjab Warriors	Ranchi	3rd place
Position in league phase: 3rd 3rd place

- Goals for: 25(1.79 per match)
- Goals against: 29(2.07 per match)
- Most goals: 9(Overall: 3rd)
  - V. R. Raghunath

=== 2014 ===
No.	Date	Result	Opponent	Venue	Report
1	26 January	3 – 2	Ranchi Rhinos	Ranchi	Match 2
2	29 January	5 – 3	Mumbai Magicians	Mumbai	Match 6
3	1 February	1 – 2	Ranchi Rhinos	Lucknow	Match 9
4	2 February	2 – 2	Punjab Warriors	Lucknow	Match 11
5	5 February	1 – 1	Delhi Waveriders	New Delhi	Match 14
6	8 February	3 – 4	Delhi Waveriders	Lucknow	Match 17
7	9 February	3 – 1	Kalinga Lancers	Lucknow	Match 19
8	13 February	4 – 3	Kalinga Lancers	Bhubaneswar	Match 23
9	15 February	1 – 2	Punjab Warriors	Mohali	Match 25
10	18 February	2 – 3	Mumbai Magicians	Lucknow	Match 29
11	22 February	0 – 1	Delhi Waveriders	Ranchi	Semi-final 1
12	23 February		Ranchi Rhinos	Ranchi	3rd place

=== 2015 ===
No.	Date	Result	Opponent	Venue	Report
1	23 January	2 – 2	Delhi Waveriders	Lucknow	Match 2
2	26 January	2 – 3	Punjab Warriors	Mohali	Match 7
3	29 January	5 – 1	Kalinga Lancers	Lucknow	Match 9
4	31 January	2 – 0	Kalinga Lancers	Bhubaneswar	Match 11
5	3 February	0 – 2	Ranchi Rays	Lucknow	Match 14
6	4 February	2 – 1	Punjab Warriors	Lucknow	Match 15
7	8 February	0 – 1	Ranchi Rays	Ranchi	Match 19

- Goals for: 13(2.17 per match)
- Goals against: 9(1.50 per match)
- Most goals: V. R. Raghunath (4)

== Kit manufacturers & sponsors ==
Year	Kit manufacturer	Sponsor
2013	TK Sports	Sahara Q Shop
2014	TK Sports	Sahara Q Shop
2015	Shiv Naresh	Sahara Q Shop
2016	Shiv Naresh	Sahara Q Shop
2017	Shiv Naresh	Sahara Q Shop
