= Ranchi Rhinos =

Field hockey team based in Ranchi, Jharkhand

- Full name: Ranchi Rhinos
- Nickname(s): Rhinos
- Founded: 2012
- Dissolved: 2014
- Home ground: Astroturf Hockey Stadium; Ranchi, Jharkhand, India (Capacity 6,000)

Personnel
- Coach: Gregg Clark
- Owner: Asia Sports Ventures PVT LTD.
Home	Away

Ranchi Rhinos was a professional field hockey team based in Ranchi, Jharkhand, that played in the Hockey India League. The team won the inaugural season of Hockey India League defeating Delhi Waveriders by 2-1. It was owned by Patel-Uniexcel Group. South African Gregg Clark was the head coach for the team, assisted by Baljit Singh Saini. German midfielder, two time Olympic champion, Moritz Fürste is the captain of the team. It was dissolved in 2014 after its owners had a dispute with HIL management. It was replaced by Ranchi Rays.

== Franchise details ==
=== Coaching staff ===
The goalkeeping coach of South Africa, David Staniforth, acted as the goalkeeping coach and video analyst for the team. David Ian John of Australia was the exercise physiologist for the team.

=== Ownership ===
The team was jointly bought by Patel - PS Group and Uniexcel Group on 14 September 2012.

== Final squad ==
Player	Nationality	Matches	Goals
Goal Keepers
Francisco Juancosa Cortés	Spain	16	–
Ankur Chaudhary	India	3	–
Forwards
Aman Akash|	England	3	
Eduard Arbós	Spain	1	
Floris Evers	Netherlands	15	1
Mandeep Singh	India	15	11
Prabhdeep Singh	India	17	
Stanli Victor Minz	India	14	
Harjeet Singh	Uganda	3	
Vikas Choudhary	India	13	1
Midfielders
Arvind Kujur	India	5	
Ashley Jackson	England	15	7
Austin Smith	South Africa	13	2
Barry Middleton	England	3	1
Birendra Lakra	India	15	
Kothajit Singh	India	16	
Manpreet Singh	India	17	2
Marc Salles Esteve	Spain	2	
Moritz Fürste (Captain)	Germany	12	1
Parvinder Singh	India	9	
Defenders
Amit Rohidas	India	16	
Bosco Pérez-Pla	Spain	13	
Justin Reid-Ross	South Africa	15	5
Sumit Topno	India	1	

== Statistics ==
Season	Matches	Won	Drawn	Lost	Win%
2013	14	9	2	3	64.29%
2014	11	4	1	6	36.36%
Home	14	7	2	5	50.00%
Away	11	6	1	4	54.54%
Overall	25	13	3	9	52.00%

Performance Details
Goals For	49 (1.96 per match)
Goals Against	47 (1.88 per match)
Most Goals	Mandeep Singh (11 goals)

Performance by Oppositions
Opposition	Matches	Won	Drawn	Lost	For	Against	Win%
Delhi Waveriders	6	2	1	3	11	14	33.33%
Kalinga Lancers	2	1	0	1	4	6	50.00%
Punjab Warriors	6	2	1	3	12	14	33.33%
Mumbai Magicians	5	4	1	0	8	3	80.00%
Uttar Pradesh Wizards	6	4	0	2	14	10	66.67%

== Fixtures and results ==
=== 2013 ===
No.	Date	Result	Opponent	Venue	Report
1	16 January	2 – 1	Punjab Warriors	Jalandhar	Match 2
2	18 January	3 – 1	Mumbai Magicians	Ranchi	Match 5
3	20 January	0 – 2	Uttar Pradesh Wizards	Lucknow	Match 7
4	23 January	4 – 5	Delhi Wave Riders	Ranchi	Match 11
5	24 January	3 – 1	Uttar Pradesh Wizards	Ranchi	Match 12
6	26 January	3 – 1	Uttar Pradesh Wizards	Lucknow	Match 14
7	28 January	2 – 1	Mumbai Magicians	Ranchi	Match 17
8	30 January	2 – 2	Delhi Wave Riders	New Delhi	Match 20
9	1 February	2 – 5	Delhi Wave Riders	Ranchi	Match 22
10	2 February	1 – 1	Punjab Warriors	Ranchi	Match 24
11	4 February	3 – 2	Punjab Warriors	Jalandhar	Match 26
12	7 February	1 – 0	Mumbai Magicians	Mumbai	Match 30
13	9 February	4 – 2	Uttar Pradesh Wizards	Ranchi	Semi-final 1
14	10 February	2 – 1	Delhi Wave Riders	Ranchi	Final
Position in League Phase: Champions

- Goals For: 32 (2.29 per match)
- Goals Against: 25 (1.79 per match)
- Most Goals: 10 (Overall: 2nd)
  - Mandeep Singh

=== 2014 ===
No.	Date	Result	Opponent	Venue	Report
1	26 January	2 – 3	Uttar Pradesh Wizards	Ranchi	Match 2
2	27 January	1 – 0	Delhi Waveriders	Ranchi	Match 4
3	1 February	2 – 1	Uttar Pradesh Wizards	Lucknow	Match 9
4	4 February	1 – 1	Mumbai Magicians	Ranchi	Match 13
5	7 February	3 – 2	Kalinga Lancers	Ranchi	Match 16
6	9 February	1 – 0	Mumbai Magicians	Mumbai	Match 20
7	12 February	0 – 1	Delhi Waveriders	Delhi	Match 22
8	14 February	1 – 4	Kalinga Lancers	Bhubaneswar	Match 24
9	16 February	2 – 4	Punjab Warriors	Mohali	Match 28
10	19 February	2 – 4	Punjab Warriors	Ranchi	Match 30
11	22 February	2 – 3	Punjab Warriors	Ranchi	Semi-final 2
12	23 February	1 – 1 (2–3 p)	Uttar Pradesh Wizards	Ranchi	3rd place
Position in League Phase: 3rd Place
