= Oskar Deecke =

German field hockey player

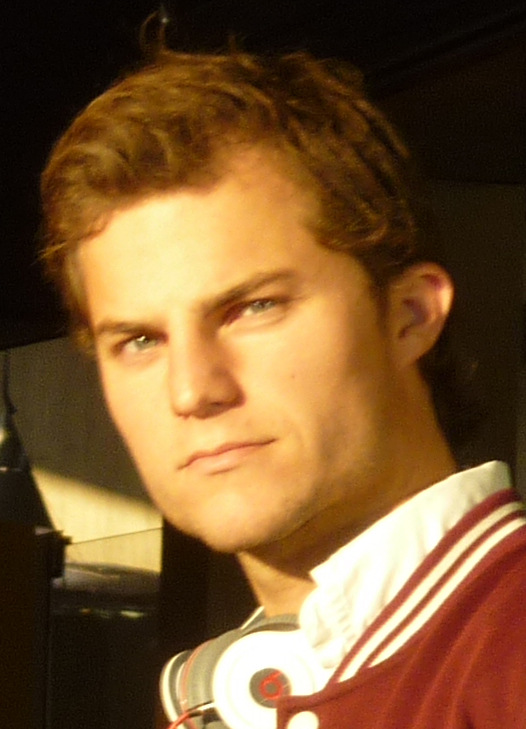
- Deecke in 2011

Personal information
- Born: 16 May 1986 (age 40) Hamburg, West Germany
- Height: 183 cm (6 ft 0 in)
- Weight: 78 kg (172 lb)

Sport
- Sport: Field hockey
Medal record
Men's field hockey
Representing Germany
Olympic Games
Gold medal – first place	2012 London	Team
Hockey World Cup
Silver medal – second place	2010 Delhi	Team
European Championship
Silver medal – second place	2015 London	Team
Gold medal – first place	2013 Boon	Team
Gold medal – first place	2011 Gladbach	Team
Silver medal – second place	2009 Amsterdam	Team
Champions Trophy
Silver medal – second place	2009 Melbourne	Team
Indoor Hockey World Cup
Gold medal – first place	2011 Poznan	Team
Gold medal – first place	2009 Vienna	Team
European Indoor Championship
Gold medal – first place	2012 Leipzig	Team
Silver medal – second place	2008 Ekaterinenburg	Team

Oskar Deecke (born 16 May 1986 in Hamburg) is a German field hockey player.

== Early life ==
Deecke attended the Gelehrtenschule des Johanneums until 2005.

== Sporting career ==
Oskar Deecke started his national career with German club Club an der Alster in Hamburg, Germany. He scored his first goal in the German Field Hockey National League in 2003, just a few days before his 17th birthday. In 2006 he joined German club Crefelder HTC in Krefeld, Germany. This team became German Indoor-Hockey champions and won the European Club Champions Cup in 2007 in Bloemendaal, Netherlands. In 2008 the "CHTC" team won the European Indoor-Hockey Club Cup. After the London 2012 Olympics, Deecke joined Club de Campo in Madrid, Spain. In June 2013 he left Madrid and joined the CHTC in Krefeld again.

Oskar Deecke started his international career in 2006, as part of the German Junior National Team that won a silver medal at the U21 European Championship in Prague, Czech Republic. As a member of the German National Indoor Team, he won the Indoor World Cup title in 2007 in Vienna, Austria. At the 2008 European Indoor Championships, Deecke was a member of the German team that lost Russia in the final, ending Germany's unbeaten run in indoor hockey.

Since 2009, Oskar Deecke has been a regular member of the German national hockey team. In that same year, the team won the silver medal in the European Championship in Amsterdam, Netherlands. At the 2010 World Cup Germany finished second, losing to Australia in the final. In 2011 Oskar Deecke and the German National Team won two titles: World Champion Indoor- Hockey in Poznan/ Poland, where he was one of the top scorers and European Champion in Mönchengladbach/ Germany. In 2012 his German National Team won two titles again: European Indoor Champion and they were the Gold Medalists at the 2012 Summer Olympics in London.. During the semi-finals against the Australian team on 9 August. Deecke succeeded "The most spectacular goal of the tournament" in the second half, as one reporter put it when he accepted a high ball from Benjamin Wess directly over the goalkeeper into the empty goal. Subsequently, this goal was disallowed after video evidence, because according to the former rules that the stick could not be passed over the shoulder. In 2013 he won with his team the European Championship, in 2015 he and his team reached second place.

As of 19 January 2016 Deecke has played more than 198 times for the German National team and has made 24 appearances for the indoor team.

Deecke participated in the auction for the 2013 Hockey India League, where he was bought by the Delhi Waveriders franchise. Wearing the number 7 shirt, Deecke was an integral part of the team, scoring 4 goals (as of 10 Feb 2013), and having a hand in many others.

== Apprenticeship ==
He finished his studies at the German Sport University in Cologne, Germany successfully in 2012.

== Family ==
Deecke has two sisters.

== Distinctions ==
- The Silver Laurel Leaf on 7 November 2012
- Plaque for honour by the town of Krefeld for the participants of the Olympiad XXX on 25 October 2012
