= Mumbai Magicians =

- Full name: Mumbai Magicians
- Nickname(s): Magicians
- Founded: 2012
- Dissolved: 2014
- Home ground: Mahindra Hockey Stadium; Mumbai, Maharashtra, India (Capacity 8,250)

Personnel
- Captain: P. R. Sreejesh
- Coach: Maharaj Krishan Kaushik
- Owner: Dabur India
Home	Away

Mumbai Magicians was a professional field hockey team based in Mumbai, Maharashtra that played in the Hockey India League from 2012 to 2014. It was owned by Dabur India. Australian coach Ric Charlesworth was the head coach for the team.

== Franchisee details ==
=== Ownership ===
The team was owned by the Burman family, promoters of fast-moving consumer goods (FMCG) company Dabur India Ltd.

== Team composition ==
Player	Nationality	Matches	Goals
Goalkeepers
David Harte	Ireland	1	–
P. R. Sreejesh	India	13	–
Forwards
Adam Dixon	England	2	
Bharat Chikara	India	2	
Faizal Saari	Malaysia	13	
Glenn Turner	Australia	13	3
K. Chinglensana Singh	India	14	1
Mark Gleghorne	England	1	1
Prabhjot Singh	India		
Sarvanjit Singh	India	14	1
Simon Mantell	England	2	
Midfielders
M. B. Aiyappa	India	14	
Ravipal Singh	India	2	1
Razie Rahim	Malaysia	2	
Suresh Toppo	India	4	
Timothy Deavin	Australia	12	
Trent Mitton	Australia	2	
Vikas Pillay	India	2	
V.S. Vinaya	India	2	1
Defenders
Chandan Singh	India	11	
Aman Khokhar	India	2	
Gurjinder Singh	India	2	1
Joel Carroll	Australia	14	
Sampath Kumar Maylaram	India	3	

== Statistics ==
Season	Matches	Won	Drawn	Lost	Win%
2013	12	1	0	11	8.33%
2014	10	2	1	7	20.00%
Home	11	2	0	9	18.18%
Away	11	1	1	9	9.09%
Overall	22	3	1	18	13.63%

Performance details
Goals for	39 (1.77 per match)
Goals against	61 (2.77 per match)
Most goals	Glenn Turner (9)

Performance by oppositions
Opposition	Matches	Won	Drawn	Lost	For	Against	Win%
Delhi Waveriders	5	0	0	5	12	19	0.00%
Kalinga Lancers	2	1	0	1	4	4	50.00%
Punjab Warriors	5	0	0	5	10	20	0.00%
Ranchi Rhinos	5	0	1	4	3	8	0.00%
Uttar Pradesh Wizards	5	2	0	3	10	10	40.00%

=== Hat-tricks ===
No.	Player	Opposition	Result	Season	Venue	Report
1	(India) Sandeep Singh	Delhi Wave Riders	3 – 4	2013	New Delhi – Dhyan Chand National Stadium	26 January 2013

== Fixtures and results ==
No.	Date	Result	Opponent	Venue	Report
1	16 January	1 – 2	Delhi Wave Riders	New Delhi	Match 3
2	18 January	1 – 3	Ranchi Rhinos	Ranchi	Match 5
3	20 January	2 – 4	Punjab Warriors	Mumbai	Match 8
4	21 January	4 – 6	Delhi Wave Riders	Mumbai	Match 9
5	24 January	3 – 4	Punjab Warriors	Jalandhar	Match 13
6	26 January	3 – 4	Delhi Wave Riders	New Delhi	Match 15
7	28 January	1 – 2	Ranchi Rhinos	Ranchi	Match 17
8	30 January	4 – 0	Uttar Pradesh Wizards	Mumbai	Match 19
9	31 January	1 – 3	Punjab Warriors	Mumbai	Match 21
10	2 February	0 – 2	Uttar Pradesh Wizards	Lucknow	Match 23
11	5 February	0 – 1	Uttar Pradesh Wizards	Mumbai	Match 28
12	7 February	0 – 1	Ranchi Rhinos	Mumbai	Match 30
Position in league phase: 5th Failed to qualify for semi-finals

- Goals for: 20(1.67 per match)
- Goals against: 32(2.67 per match)
- Most goals: 11(Overall: 1st)
  - Sandeep Singh

=== 2014 ===
No.	Date	Result	Opponent	Venue	Report
1	26 January	3 – 5	Punjab Warriors	Mohali	Match 3
2	29 January	3 – 5	Uttar Pradesh Wizards	Mumbai	Match 6
3	1 February	1 – 2	Kalinga Lancers	Bhubaneswar	Match 10
4	4 February	1 – 1	Ranchi Rhinos	Ranchi	Match 13
5	6 February	1 – 2	Delhi Waveriders	New Delhi	Match 15
6	8 February	1 – 4	Punjab Warriors	Mumbai	Match 18
7	9 February	0 – 1	Ranchi Rhinos	Mumbai	Match 20
8	15 February	3 – 5	Delhi Waveriders	Mumbai	Match 26
9	16 February	3 – 2	Kalinga Lancers	Mumbai	Match 27
10	18 February	3 – 2	Uttar Pradesh Wizards	Lucknow	Match 29
Position in league phase: 5th Failed to qualify for semi-finals

- Goals for: 19(1.90 per match)
- Goals against: 29(2.90 per match)
- Most goals: 7
  - Glenn Turner
