= Santa Singh (field hockey) =

Indian field hockey player (born 1996)

Personal information
- Born: 11 February 1996 (age 30) Haryana, India

Sport
- Sport: Field hockey
- Position: Midfielder
- Club: Delhi Waveriders
Senior career
Years	Team	Caps	Goals
2015–present	Delhi Waveriders	-	-
National team
Years	Team	Caps	Goals
–	India		-
Medal record
Men's field hockey
Representing India
Junior World Cup
Gold medal – first place	2016 Lucknow

Santa Singh (born 11 February 1996) is an Indian field hockey player who plays as a Midfielder. He was part of the Indian squad that won Gold at 2016 Men's Hockey Junior World Cup in Lukhnow, India.
