= Vickram Kanth =

Indian field hockey player (born 1987)

Personal information
- Born: 11 April 1987 (age 39) Somwarpet, Karnataka, India

Sport
- Sport: Field hockey
- Position: Defender
National team
Years	Team	Caps	Goals
2006–2014	India		-
Medal record
Men's field hockey
Representing India
Asia Cup
Gold medal – first place	2007 Chennai	Team

Vickram Kanth (born 11 April 1987) is an Indian field hockey player who plays as a defender. He was part of the Indian team that won gold at the 2007 Men's Hockey Asia Cup, as well as the teams that won bronze at the 2007 Sultan Azlan Shah Cup and silver at the 2008 Sultan Azlan Shah Cup.
