= Birendra Lakra =

Indian field hockey player (born 1990)

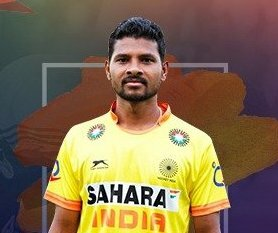
- Lakra in 2017

Personal information
- Born: 3 February 1990 (age 36) Lachchada, Sundargarh, Odisha, India
- Height: 1.67 m (5 ft 6 in)
- Weight: 68 kg (150 lb)

Sport
- Sport: Field hockey
- Position: Defender Arjuna awardee
- Club: BPCL
Senior career
| Years | Team | Caps | Goals |
| 2012 | Chandigarh Comets | - | - |
| – | BPCL | - | - |
| –2008 | Orissa Steelers | - | - |
| 2013–2014 | Ranchi Rhinos | 15 | 0 |
| 2015–2017 | Ranchi Rays | - | - |
| 2017–2022 | BPCL | - | - |
| 2024–2025 | Team Gonasika | - | - |
National team
| Years | Team | Caps | Goals |
| 2012–2022 | India | 208 | (10) |
Medal record
Men's field hockey
Representing India
Olympic Games
| Bronze medal – third place | 2020 Tokyo | Team |
Asian Games
| Gold medal – first place | 2014 Incheon | Team |
| Bronze medal – third place | 2018 Jakarta | Team |
Asia Cup
| Silver medal – second place | 2013 Ipoh |
| Bronze medal – third place | 2022 Jakarta |
Champions Trophy
| Silver medal – second place | 2018 Breda |
Asian Champions Trophy
| Gold medal – first place | 2016 Kuantan |
| Silver medal – second place | 2012 Doha |
World League
| Bronze medal – third place | 2015 Raipur | Team |
| Bronze medal – third place | 2015 Bhubaneswar | Team |
Commonwealth Games
| Silver medal – second place | 2014 Glasgow | Team |
- Updated on 5 August 2021

Birendra Lakra (born 3 February 1990) is an Indian former field hockey player. He represented India in men's field hockey and recently came out of retirement alongside Rupinderpal Singh and captained the Indian team in the men's tournament of field hockey at the 2018 Asian Games, held in Jakarta, Indonesia, winning a bronze medal. In the 2020 Tokyo Olympics also, he also served as the vice-captain of Indian team.

== Personal life ==
Birendra Lakra was born on 3 February 1990 in the village of Lachchada in the Sundargarh District of Odisha, on the border with Jharkhand. He was born to a family belonging to an Oraon tribe.His Elder Brother Is Former International Hockey Field Player Bimal Lakra

== Career ==
Birendra Lakra is a player for the Rourkela Steel Plant's SAIL Hockey Academy. He was included in the Indian junior team for the first time for the Singapore tour in 2007. He represented India in the Test series against South Africa in 2012, in the Champions Challenge tournament in South Africa in 2011, at the SAAF Games at Dhaka in 2010, at the Youth Olympics at Sydney in 2009 and at the Junior World Cup at Singapore in 2009.

He scored the first goal in India's victory in the final game of the Olympic Hockey Qualifying Tournament against France. He played a key role in taking India in to the semifinals of 2012 Champions Trophy. India defeated Belgium with the help of a single goal that was produced by the pass given by Birendra Lakra to the forward. With this India reached the semifinals of the Champions Trophy for the first time in eight years.

At the 2014 Commonwealth Games, Lakra won a silver medal with India.

=== Hockey India League ===
In the auction of the inaugural Hockey India League season, Lakra was bought by the Ranchi franchise for US$41,000 with his base price being US$9,250. The Ranchi team was named Ranchi Rhinos. The team finished first in the inaugural season and third in the 2014 season. Following disputes between the franchise and Hockey India, the team decided to pull out, after which Lakra signed with the Ranchi Rays franchise from the 2015 season.
