= Delhi Waveriders =

Field hockey franchise based in Delhi, India

- Full name: Delhi Waveriders
- Founded: 2012; 14 years ago
- Home ground: Shivaji Stadium; New Delhi, India (Capacity 7,500)

Personnel
- Owner: The Wave Group
- Website: Official Website
Home	Away

Delhi Waveriders was a professional field hockey team based in Delhi that played in the Hockey India League. It was owned by The Wave Group.

== Franchisee details ==
=== Ownership ===
The team is owned by The Wave Group, after the company bought the franchise on 17 September 2012. The group is involved in many businesses including sugar manufacturing, distilleries, paper manufacturing, real estate and retail management.

Wave Group is envisioned by founder-leader Kulwant Singh Chadha. The Chadha Group has been integrated by his three sons; — late Gurdeep Singh Chadha, late Hardeep Singh Chadha, Rajinder Singh Chadha, and grandson Manpreet Singh (Monty) Chadha. Starting with a sugar crusher in the state of Uttar Pradesh, the group has progressively cast its footprint in diverse business industries. John Abraham is the co-owner of Delhi Waveriders. He owns 13% share of the team.

== 2017 squad ==
Player	Nationality
Goalkeepers
Vikas Dahiya	India
Harjot Singh	India
Vincent Vanasch	Belgium
Defenders
Manuel Brunet	Argentina
Vickram Kanth	India
Justin Reid-Ross	South Africa
Rupinder Pal Singh	India
Austin Smith	South Africa
Tristan White	Australia
Midfielders
Surender Kumar	India
Harjeet Singh	India
Santa Singh	India
Benjamin Stanzl	Austria
Forwards
Mandeep Antil	India
Simon Child	New Zealand
Iain Levers	England
Mandeep Singh	India
Parvinder Singh	India
Prabhdeep Singh	India
Talwinder Singh	India
Pradhan Somanna	India

== Support staff (2017) ==
Role	Name
Chief advisor	Ajit Pal Singh
Coach	Cedric Dsouza
Team manager	Paul Revington
Asst. coach	Baljeet Singh Saini
Sports scientist	Robin van Ginkel
Physiotherapist	Anand Dubey

== Statistics ==
Season	Matches	Won	Drawn	Lost	Win%
2013	14	10	2	2	71.43%
2014	12	9	1	2	75.00%
2015	12	4	4	4	33.33%
2016	12	6	0	6	50.00%
Home	24	13	3	8	54.16%
Away	26	16	4	6	61.53%
Overall	50	29	7	14	58.00%

Performance details
Goals For	130 (2.60 per match)
Goals Against	110 (2.20 per match)
Most Goals	Rupinder Pal Singh (26 goals)

Performance by Oppositions
Opposition	Matches	Won	Drawn	Lost	For	Against	Win%
Kalinga Lancers	6	3	1	2	18	11	50.00%
Mumbai Magicians	5	5	0	0	19	12	100.00%
Punjab Warriors	13	7	0	6	27	33	53.84%
Ranchi Rhinos	6	3	1	2	14	11	50.00%
Uttar Pradesh Wizards	11	5	4	2	25	22	45.45%
Ranchi Rays	5	3	1	1	14	8	60.00%
Dabang Mumbai	4	3	0	1	13	13	75.00%
Total	50	29	7	14	130	110	58.00%

== Fixtures and results ==
=== 2013 ===
No.	Date	Result	Opponent	Venue	Report
1	14 January	2 – 1	Punjab Warriors	New Delhi	Match 1
2	16 January	2 – 1	Mumbai Magicians	New Delhi	Match 3
3	19 January	1 – 1	Uttar Pradesh Wizards	Lucknow	Match 6
4	21 January	6 – 4	Mumbai Magicians	Mumbai	Match 9
5	23 January	5 – 4	Ranchi Rhinos	Ranchi	Match 11
6	26 January	4 – 3	Mumbai Magicians	New Delhi	Match 15
7	29 January	3 – 0	Punjab Warriors	New Delhi	Match 18
8	30 January	2 – 2	Ranchi Rhinos	New Delhi	Match 20
9	1 February	5 – 2	Ranchi Rhinos	Ranchi	Match 22
10	3 February	3 – 0	Uttar Pradesh Wizards	Lucknow	Match 25
11	5 February	3 – 2	Punjab Warriors	Jalandhar	Match 27
12	7 February	1 – 4	Uttar Pradesh Wizards	New Delhi	Match 29
13	9 February	3 – 1	Punjab Warriors	Ranchi	Semi-final 2
14	10 February	1 – 2	Ranchi Rhinos	Ranchi	Final
Position in League Phase: 1st Runners-up

- Goals For: 41 (2.93 per match)
- Goals Against: 27 (1.93 per match)
- Most Goals: 7 (Overall: 4th)
  - Rupinder Pal Singh

=== 2014 ===
No.	Date	Result	Opponent	Venue	Report
1	25 January	3 – 1	Punjab Warriors	Mohali	Match 1
2	27 January	0 – 1	Ranchi Rhinos	Ranchi	Match 4
3	30 January	5 – 0	Kalinga Lancers	Delhi	Match 7
4	31 January	1 – 3	Punjab Warriors	Delhi	Match 8
5	2 February	4 – 3	Kalinga Lancers	Bhubaneswar	Match 12
6	5 February	1 – 1	Uttar Pradesh Wizards	Delhi	Match 14
7	6 February	2 – 1	Mumbai Magicians	Delhi	Match 15
8	8 February	4 – 3	Uttar Pradesh Wizards	Lucknow	Match 17
9	12 February	1 – 0	Ranchi Rhinos	Delhi	Match 22
10	15 February	5 – 3	Mumbai Magicians	Mumbai	Match 26
11	22 February	1 – 0	Uttar Pradesh Wizards	Ranchi	Semi-final 1
12	23 February	3 – 1	Punjab Warriors	Ranchi	Final
Position in League Phase: Champion

- Goals For: 30 (2.50 per match)
- Goals Against: 17 (1.41 per match)
- Most Goals: 6 (Overall: 5th)
  - Rupinder Pal Singh

=== 2015 ===
No.	Date	Result	Opponent	Venue	Report
1	23 January	2 – 2	Uttar Pradesh Wizards	Lucknow	Match 2
2	26 January	2 – 2	Ranchi Rays	Ranchi	Match 6
3	30 January	1 – 3	Punjab Warriors	Delhi	Match 10
4	1 February	3 – 1	Dabang Mumbai	Delhi	Match 12
5	5 February	3 – 1	Dabang Mumbai	Mumbai	Match 16
6	7 February	0 – 7	Punjab Warriors	Mohali	Match 18
7	12 February	2 – 2	Kalinga Lancers	Bhubaneswar	Match 23
8	14 February	2 – 0	Ranchi Rays	Delhi	Match 25
9	15 February	1 – 2	Kalinga Lancers	Delhi	Match 27
10	18 February	3 – 3	Uttar Pradesh Wizards	Delhi	Match 29
11	21 February	0 – 2	Punjab Warriors	Delhi	Semi-final 2
12	22 February	2 – 1	Uttar Pradesh Wizards	Delhi	3/4th Place
Position in League Phase: 3rd Place

- Goals For: 21 (1.75 per match)
- Goals Against: 26 (2.16 per match)
- Most Goals: Akashdeep Singh (4), Simon Child (4)

=== 2016 ===
No.	Date	Result	Opponent	Venue	Report
1	20 January	5 – 4	Punjab Warriors	Chandigarh	Match 3
2	23 January	3 – 1	Uttar Pradesh Wizards	Lucknow	Match 6
3	26 January	1 – 2	Ranchi Rays	Ranchi	Match 9
4	29 January	4 – 3	Dabang Mumbai	Mumbai	Match 11
5	1 February	4 – 6	Uttar Pradesh Wizards	Delhi	Match 14
6	2 February	2 – 5	Punjab Warriors	Delhi	Match 15
7	5 February	0 – 4	Kalinga Lancers	Bhubaneswar	Match 18
8	9 February	3 – 8	Dabang Mumbai	Delhi	Match 22
9	11 February	7 – 4	Ranchi Rays	Delhi	Match 24
10	17 February	6 – 0	Kalinga Lancers	Delhi	Match 30
11	20 February	1 – 3	Punjab Warriors	Ranchi	Semi-final 1
12	21 February	2 – 0	Ranchi Rays	Ranchi	3/4th Place
Position in League Phase: 3rd Place

- Goals for: 38 (3.16 per match)
- Goals against: 40 (3.33 per match)
- Most Goals: Rupinder Pal Singh (12)

== Kit manufacturers and sponsors ==
Year	Kit manufacturers	Sponsor
2013	TK Sports	WAVE
2014	TK Sports	WAVE
2015	TK Sports	WAVE
2016	Shiv Naresh Sports	WAVE
2017	Shiv Naresh Sports	WAVE
