= Tristan Clemons =

Australian field hockey goalkeeper

Personal information
- Nationality: Australian

Sport
- Country: Australia
- Sport: Field hockey
- Event: Men's team

Tristan Clemons is an Australian field hockey goalkeeper from Western Australia.

== Field hockey ==
In 2009, he played for the Western Australian Thundersticks in the Australian Hockey League. He was in goal for his team's 4–2 win over Tasmania in a game in March. It was his first season with the team. He continued to play for them in 2010 and 2011. In 2010, his team finished the season in fourth place.

=== National team ===
In 2011, he played in goal for Australia during the Lanco International Super Series 9s, where Australia won 4–1 in a game against India, with Sardar Singh scoring against Clemons. In November 2011, he was part of the Australia men's national field hockey team that played in the four nations tournament in Perth, Western Australia. The competition was his international debut at a competition that inaugurated new goal widths.

In December 2011, he was named as one of fourteen players to be on the 2012 Summer Olympics Australian men's national Olympic development squad. While this squad is not in the top twenty-eight and separate from the Olympic training coach, the Australian coach Ric Charlesworth did not rule out selecting from only the training squad, with players from the Olympic development having a chance at possibly being called up to represent Australia at the Olympics. He trained with the team from 18 January to mid-March in Perth, Western Australia.
