= Andy Hayward (field hockey) =

New Zealand field hockey player

Medal record

Men's field hockey

Representing New Zealand

Commonwealth Games
Bronze medal – third place	2010 Delhi	Team competition

Andrew Hayward (born 22 June 1985) is a New Zealand field hockey player. At the 2012 Summer Olympics, he competed for the national team in the men's tournament. He was a member of the men's team which won the bronze medal at the 2010 Commonwealth Games.

Hayward has played club hockey for Hampstead & Westminster in the UK, Delhi Waveriders in India and Midlands in New Zealand.
