= Mandeep Antil =

Indian field hockey player (born 1989)

Personal information
- Born: 10 November 1989 (age 36) Sonipat district, Haryana, India

Sport
- Sport: Field hockey
- Position: Forward
National team
Years	Team	Caps	Goals
–	India		-
Medal record
Men's field hockey
Representing India
South Asian Games
Silver medal – second place	2016 Guwahati	Team
- Updated on 8 July 2016

Mandeep Antil (born 10 November 1989) is an Indian field hockey player who plays as a forward. He was the captain of the national team that won the silver medal at the 2016 South Asian Games.
