= Danish Mujtaba =

Indian field hockey player

Personal information
- Born: 20 December 1988 (age 37) Allahabad, Uttar Pradesh, India
- Height: 166 cm (5 ft 5 in)
- Weight: 66 kg (146 lb) (2014)

Sport
- Sport: Field hockey
- Position: Forward
Senior career
Years	Team	Caps	Goals
–	Chennai Cheetahs	-	-
2013–present	Delhi Waveriders	12	1
National team
Years	Team	Caps	Goals
2009–present	India	179	(28)
Medal record
Men's field hockey
Representing India
Asian Games
Gold medal – first place	2014 Incheon	Team
Bronze medal – third place	2010 Guangzhou	Team
Commonwealth Games
Silver medal – second place	2010 Delhi	Team
Silver medal – second place	2014 Glasgow	Team
Champions Trophy
Silver medal – second place	2016 London	Team
Asian Champions Trophy
Gold medal – first place	2011 Ordos City
Silver medal – second place	2012 Doha
Hockey World League
Bronze medal – third place	2015 Raipur
- Updated on 7 December 2015

Danish Mujtaba (born 20 December 1988 in Allahabad) is an Indian professional field hockey player. He made his debut for the national team in 2009. He represented India during the 2012 Summer Olympics in London and the 2016 Olympics in Rio.

He comes from a family of hockey players, including his grandfather Idris Ahmed, his uncle Atif Idris, his father Ghulam Mujtaba and his elder brother Hamza Mujtaba who have played for India. He first represented India at junior level, at the 2009 Junior World Cup. He played for the senior team at the 2010 World Cup and later went on to become Captain of national team in 2013.

He is an alumnus of the Guru Gobind Singh Sports College, Lucknow and Jamia Millia Islamia.

== Career ==
Mujtaba made his way to the national team after doing well at the junior level. He is a product of Delhi based Air India-SAI Hockey Academy which he joined in 2004 and has attended a training program at the Australian Institute of Sport. He is sports officer in Uttar Pradesh Power Corporation Limited (UPPCL) since January 2011.

== Personal life ==
Mujtaba married Nayala of Allahabad in November 2016. Nayala completed M.Tech from SHIATS. Her father Mohammad Gurfan is teacher by profession.
