= Nithin Thimmaiah =

Indian field hockey player (born 1988)

Personal information
- Born: 8 December 1988 (age 37) Kodagu district, Karnataka, India

Sport
- Sport: Field hockey
- Position: Forward
National team
| Years | Team | Caps | Goals |
| – | India | | - |
Medal record
Men's field hockey
Representing India
Asia Cup
| Silver medal – second place | 2013 Ipoh |
Asian Champions Trophy
| Silver medal – second place | 2012 Doha |
- Updated on 8 July 2016

Nithin Thimmaiah Nithin Thimmaiah is an Indian Field Hockey player from Kodagu (Coorg) district, Karnataka. He represented the Indian Hockey team in various international tournaments since his debut in 2012. He currently represents the Comptroller and Auditor General of India (CAG) in domestic hockey.

== Education and early career ==
Hailing from Kodagu, he completed his education from St. Josephs Indian High School, Bangalore and St. Josephs College, Bangalore. He has represented both his alma mater and Bangalore University in numerous tournaments. He has also represented Karnataka State Hockey Team from 2009 and became the captain of the team in 2014

In 2013, he represented Uttar Pradesh Wizards in the Hockey India League and the team went on to win a bronze medal. Subsequently, in 2016, he represented Punjab Warriors in the Hockey India League, who went on to win the championship.

== Awards and recognitions ==
In 2015, he was awarded the prestigious Ekalavya Award by the Government of Karnataka for his contributions to hockey. He is also the recipient of Karnataka Olympic Association Award (Best Sportsperson-Hockey) from the Government of Karnataka in 2014.
