= Nick Wilson (field hockey) =

New Zealand field hockey player

Personal information
- Born: 6 August 1990 (age 36) Palmerston North, New Zealand
- Height: 1.80 m (5 ft 11 in)
- Weight: 81 kg (179 lb)

Sport
- Sport: Field hockey
- Position: Forward
- Club: Central Falcons
National team
Years	Team	Caps	Goals
2007–present	New Zealand	176	(77)
Medal record
Men's field hockey
Representing New Zealand
Commonwealth Games
Bronze medal – third place	2010 Delhi	Team
- Updated on 24 July 2021

Nicholas Wilson (born 6 August 1990) is a New Zealand field hockey player who plays at striker. He currently plays for New Zealand's Hockey National Team, the Black Stick men's team.

== Career ==
He attended Palmerston North Intermediate Normal School and then on to Palmerston North Boys' High School, where he represented their first eleven team from 2005 to 2007. Wilson spent his final year at Westlake Boys High School in Auckland.

Wilson made his first appearance for 'The Black Sticks' against Korea in New Zealand in November 2007 at the age of 17. He scored his first goal against the number one (at the time) Australian team at Sydney Olympic Park. Known for his attacking style of play, he was touted as one of New Zealand's next field hockey stars.

In 2010, Wilson became the first New Zealander to be nominated for the International Hockey Federation's (FIH) Young Player of the Year award. He was also named in the FIH All Stars team of players who "lit up the hockey world over the past year".

He played for New Zealand at the 2010 Commonwealth Games, winning a bronze medal. He also played for New Zealand at the 2012 and 2016 Summer Olympics.
