= Justin Reid-Ross =

South African field hockey player (born 1986)

Personal information
- Born: 16 July 1986 (age 40) Stellenbosch, South Africa

Sport
- Sport: Field hockey
- Position: Defender
Senior career
Years	Team	Caps	Goals
2010–2014	Pinoké	-	-
2013–2014	Ranchi Rhinos	-	-
2014–2020	Amsterdam	-	-
2015	Ranchi Rays	-	-
2016–2017	Delhi Waveriders	-	-
2020–2021	Hurley	-	-
National team
Years	Team	Caps	Goals
2006–2014	South Africa	97	-
- Updated on 9 July 2020

Justin Reid-Ross (born 16 July 1986) is a retired South African field hockey player who played as a defender for the South African national team.

At the 2012 Summer Olympics, he competed for the national team in the men's tournament. He played a total of 97 caps for the national team from 2006 to 2014.

== Club career ==
Reid-Ross came to the Netherlands in 2010 to play for Pinoké. After four seasons he left Pinoké for Amsterdam. In the 2014–15 season he became the top scorer in the Dutch Hoofdklasse. He also played for the Ranchi Rhinos, the Ranchi Rays and the Delhi Waveriders in the Hockey India League from 2013 to 2017. In 2020 he had to leave Amsterdam and he went to Hurley. After one season at Hurley he retired as a hockey player.
