= V. R. Raghunath =

Indian field hockey player

Personal information
- Full name: Vokkaliga Ramachandra Raghunath
- Born: 1 November 1988 (age 37) Hathur, Kodagu, Karnataka, India
- Height: 177 cm (5 ft 10 in)

Sport
- Sport: Field hockey
- Position: Fullback
Senior career
Years	Team	Caps	Goals
–present	IOCL	-	-
2013–present	Uttar Pradesh Wizards	-	25
National team
Years	Team	Caps	Goals
2003–	India U16		-
2005–2017	India	228	(132)
Medal record
Men's field hockey
Representing India
Asian Games
Gold medal – first place	2014 Incheon	Team
Asia Cup
Gold medal – first place	2007 Chennai	Team
Silver medal – second place	2013 Ipoh	Team
Asian Champions Trophy
Gold medal – first place	2011 Ordos City
Silver medal – second place	2012 Doha	Team
Champions Trophy
Silver medal – second place	2016 London	Team
Commonwealth Games
Silver medal – second place	2014 Glasgow	Team
Hockey World League
Bronze medal – third place	2014–15 Raipur	Team
U16 Asia Cup
Gold medal – first place	2003 Dhaka

Vokkaliga Ramachandra Raghunath (born 1 November 1988) is a former Indian professional field hockey player. He played as a fullback and was known for his abilities as a drag flicker.

== Early life ==
Raghunath was born on 1 November 1988 to a former Indian field hockey player V. S. Ramachandra and Doddamane Bojamma along with his two sisters, Niveditha Sanketh and Kavana Yatheesh.

== Career ==
Raghunath made his debut for India U16 in the 2003 sub-junior Asia Cup in Dhaka that India won. He made his senior debut in the national side during the bi-lateral series in 2005 against Pakistan, as a replacement to an injured Sandeep Singh. He was a part of the Indian team that won bronze in the 2007 Sultan Azlan Shah Cup, silver in 2008, gold in the 2007 Asia Cup and silver in 2013. Having scored six goals in the 2013 Asia Cup, Raghunath was awarded the 'Best Player of the Tournament'.

=== Hockey India League ===
In the auction of the inaugural Hockey India League, Raghunath was bought by the Uttar Pradesh franchise for US$76,000 with his base price being US$13,900. The team was named Uttar Pradesh Wizards. He captained the team to a third-place finish in the inaugural season. He ended the first season having scored 9 goals in 14 games and the second season scoring 8 goals in 12 games.
