= Dharamvir Singh =

Indian field hockey player (born 1990)

Personal information
- Nationality: Indian
- Born: 5 August 1990 (age 35)
- Height: 177 cm (5 ft 10 in)
- Weight: 78 kg (172 lb)

Sport
- Country: India
- Sport: Field hockey
- Club: Chandigarh Hockey Academy
- Coached by: Michael Nobbs (national); Harinder Singh; Jose Brasa; Terry Wash; Realant Oltmans
Medal record
Representing India
Hockey World League
Bronze medal – third place	2015 Raipur
Commonwealth Games
Silver medal – second place	2014 Glasgow	Team
Asian Games
Gold medal – first place	2014 Incheon	Team
Bronze medal – third place	2010 Guangzhou	Team
Asia Cup
Silver medal – second place	2013 Malaysia
Asian Champions Trophy
Silver medal – second place	2012 Doha
Sultan Azlan Shah Cup
Bronze medal – third place	2012 Malaysia
Bronze medal – third place	2015 Malaysia
- Updated on 8 December 2012

Dharamvir Singh (born 5 August 1990) represented India in Men's Hockey during the 2012 London Olympics. He was part of the Indian team that won the silver medal at the 2014 Commonwealth Games.

He supports Indian Collegiate Athletic Program (ICAP) and has agreed to be a mentor for Hockey.
