= Major Dhyan Chand Hockey Stadium, Lucknow =

Field hockey stadium in Lucknow, India

Major Dhyanchand Hockey Stadium, Lucknow
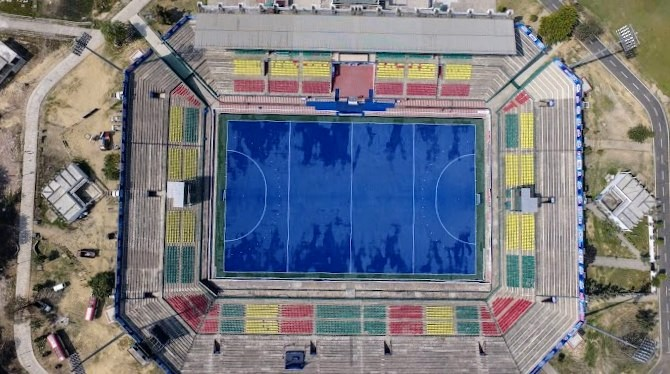
- Interactive map of Major Dhyanchand Hockey Stadium, Lucknow
- Address: Guru Gobind Singh Sports College campus, Kursi Road, Guramba; Lucknow; India
- Coordinates: 26.930203°N 80.986045°E
- Owner: Guru Gobind Singh Sports College, Lucknow (Government of Uttar Pradesh)
- Operator: Guru Gobind Singh Sports College, Lucknow
- Capacity: 10,000

Tenants
- UP Rudras (2024–present); Guru Gobind Singh Sports College, Lucknow

The Major Dhyanchand Hockey Stadium, Lucknow or Major Dhyan Chand Stadium is a field hockey stadium in Lucknow, Uttar Pradesh, India named after Indian hockey player Major Dhyanchand. It is situated in Guru Gobind Singh Sports College's campus. It serves as the home ground for Hockey India League franchise, UP Rudras.

== See also ==
- Hockey India League
- 2013 Hockey India League
- Guru Gobind Singh Sports College
- Chandgi Ram Sports Complex
