= Pakistan national field hockey team tours and matches (2010–2014) =

- Season: 2010–2014

This page lists all the tours and matches played by Pakistan national field hockey team from 2010 to 2014. During this period Pakistan's most successful competition were the Asian Games (Champions: 2010) their first gold medal at the competition in 20 years. Asian Champions Trophy (Champions: 2012, 2013). Pakistan failed to qualify for the 2014 Hockey World Cup during this period after losing at the 2013 Hockey Asia Cup first time the team failed to qualify for the tournament in its history.

== List of tours ==
Year	Host(s)	Competition	GP	W	D	L	GF	GA	Result	Position	Head Coach
2010	Qatar	Internationals	2	0	2	0	6	6	–	–	(Pakistan) Shahid Ali Khan
2010	India	2010 Hockey World Cup	6	1	0	5	11	19	Pool stage	12th	(Pakistan) Shahid Ali Khan
2010	Malaysia	2010 Sultan Azlan Shah Cup	7	3	2	2	23	21	Pool stage	5th	(Pakistan) Khawaja Junaid
2010	Spain, Netherlands	Internationals	5	2	2	1	14	7	–	–	(Netherlands) Michel Van Den Heuvel
2010	India	2010 Commonwealth Games	5	2	0	3	13	12	Pool stage	6th	(Netherlands) Michel Van Den Heuvel
2010	China	2010 Asian Games	6	5	0	1	31	7	Champions	1st	(Netherlands) Michel Van Den Heuvel
2011	Malaysia	2011 Sultan Azlan Shah Cup	7	4	0	3	19	18	Runner-up	2nd	(Netherlands) Michel Van Den Heuvel
2011	Ireland,	UCD Four Nations	4	3	0	1	9	8	Champions	1st	(Netherlands) Michel Van Den Heuvel
2011	Netherlands	2011 Men's Hockey RaboTrophy	3	0	1	2	3	7	Pool stage	4th	(Netherlands) Michel Van Den Heuvel
2011	Belgium, Netherlands	Internationals	5	2	1	2	9	9	–	–	(Netherlands) Michel Van Den Heuvel
2011	China	2011 Asian Champions Trophy	6	3	1	2	13	10	Runner-up	2nd	(Netherlands) Michel Van Den Heuvel
2011	Australia	Perth Tri Nations Challenge	5	1	2	2	11	18	Champions	1st	(Netherlands) Michel Van Den Heuvel
2011	New Zealand	2011 Hockey Champions Trophy	6	2	0	4	15	23	Pool stage	7th	(Netherlands) Michel Van Den Heuvel
2012	Malaysia	2012 Sultan Azlan Shah Cup	6	1	0	5	9	16	Pool stage	7th	(Pakistan) Khawaja Junaid
2012	Belgium, Germany, Netherlands	Internationals	4	1	1	2	8	14	–	–	(Pakistan) Khawaja Junaid
2012	England	2012 Summer Olympics	6	3	1	2	12	18	Pool stage	7th	(Pakistan) Khawaja Junaid
2012	Australia	2012 Hockey Champions Trophy	6	3	0	3	10	12	Semifinals	3rd	(Pakistan) Hanif Khan
2012	Qatar	2012 Asian Champions Trophy	6	4	1	1	27	16	Champions	1st	(Pakistan) Hanif Khan
2013	Malaysia	2013 Sultan Azlan Shah Cup	6	1	2	3	13	20	Pool stage	6th	(Pakistan) Hanif Khan
2013	Malaysia	2012–13 Hockey World League Semifinals	6	2	2	2	22	15	Pool stage	7th	(Pakistan) Hanif Khan
2013	Malaysia	2013 Hockey Asia Cup	5	4	0	1	28	4	Semifinals	3rd	(Pakistan) Tahir Zaman
2013	Australia	Internationals	2	0	1	1	5	7	–	–	(Pakistan) Tahir Zaman
2013	Japan	2013 Asian Champions Trophy	6	5	1	0	24	8	Champions	1st	(Pakistan) Tahir Zaman
2014	South Korea	2014 Asian Games	6	5	0	1	27	2	Runner-up	2nd	(Pakistan) Shahnaz Shiekh
2014	India	2014 Hockey Champions Trophy	6	2	0	4	11	20	Runner-up	2nd	(Pakistan) Shahnaz Shiekh

== Results ==
=== 2010 ===
==== 2010 Series – Netherlands ====
20 January 2010
Test match

Pakistan	4 – 4	Netherlands
Bilgrami 24'; Haseem 26'; Ali 47'; Abbasi 61'	Report	Reckers 18' van der Weerden 37'; Derikx 61'; Taekema 67'

Doha, Qatar

Stadium: Al-Rayyan Stadium

21 January 2010
Test match

Pakistan	2 – 2	Netherlands
Butt 28'; Abbas 41'	Report	van der Horst 38' de Nooijer 56'

Doha, Qatar

Stadium: Al-Rayyan Stadium

==== 2010 Hockey World Cup ====
28 February 2010
Pool stage

India	4 – 1	Pakistan
Shivendra 27'; Sandeep 35+', 56'; Prabjhot 37'	Report	Abbas 59'

New Delhi, India

Stadium: Major Dhyan Chand National Stadium

2 March 2010
Pool stage

Pakistan	2 – 1	Spain
Haseem 29', 67'	Report	Alegre 65'

New Delhi, India

Stadium: Major Dhyan Chand National Stadium

6 March 2010
Pool stage

South Africa	4 – 3	Pakistan
Carr 38'; Haley 41'; T. Paton 46'; Harper 54'	Report	Butt 6'; Imran 68'; Ahmed 70+'

New Delhi, India

Stadium: Major Dhyan Chand National Stadium

4 March 2010
Pool stage

England	5 – 2	Pakistan
Clarke 20', 62'; Jackson 32'; Middleton 52', 65'	Report	Abbasi 45'; Butt 49'

New Delhi, India

Stadium: Major Dhyan Chand National Stadium

8 March 2010
Pool stage

Australia	2 – 1	Pakistan
Abbott 38', 68'	Report	Abbas 24'

New Delhi, India

Stadium: Major Dhyan Chand National Stadium

11 March 2010
Eleventh and twelfth place

Canada	3 – 2 (a.e.t.)	Pakistan
Grimes 12'; Pearson 58'; Tupper 83'	Report	Butt 4'; Ali 46'

New Delhi, India

Stadium: Major Dhyan Chand National Stadium

==== 2010 Sultan Azlan Shah Cup ====
6 May 2010
Pool stage

Malaysia	3 – 3	Pakistan
Hafiz 19', 51'; Amin 50'	Report	Rasool 4'; Irfan 56'; Zubair 70'

Ipoh, Malaysia

Stadium: Azlan Shah Stadium

7 May 2010
Pool stage

India	4 – 2	Pakistan
Sardar 26'; Antil 47'; Gurbaj 53'; Khandekar 56'	Report	Imran 37'; Ali 66'

Ipoh, Malaysia

Event: 2010 Sultan Azlan Shah Cup
Pool stage

9 May 2010
Pool stage

Pakistan	6 – 2	China
Imran 17'; Haseem 30', 42'; Zubair 45', 47'; Rizwan Sr. 61'	Report	Yu 18'; Sun L. 40'

Ipoh, Malaysia

Stadium: Azlan Shah Stadium

12 May 2010
Pool stage

Australia	5 – 5	Pakistan
Bates 11'; Schubert 17', 61'; Ciriello 26', 40'	Report	Rizwan Sr. 21'; Irfan 53'; Imran 58', 69'; Umar 64'

Ipoh, Malaysia

Stadium: Azlan Shah Stadium

13 May 2010
Pool stage

Pakistan	6 – 2	Egypt
Mossen 12'; Zubair 19'; Imran 29'; Haseem 40', 52'; Waqas 42'	Report	Hassan 51', 70'

Ipoh, Malaysia

Stadium: Azlan Shah Stadium

15 May 2010
Pool stage

South Korea	4 – 2	Pakistan
Nam-yong 38', 46'; Hyun-woo 66', 68'	Report	Zubair 32'; Imran 57'

Ipoh, Malaysia

Stadium: Azlan Shah Stadium

16 May 2010
Fifth and sixth place

Pakistan	1 – 1	China
Rasool 43'	Report	Na 24'
Penalties
	6–5

Ipoh, Malaysia

Stadium: Azlan Shah Stadium

==== 2010 Triangular series ====
11 July 2010
Test match

Spain	2 – 2	Pakistan
Fàbregas 27'; Alegre 49'	Report	Abbasi 3'; Rasool 68'

Madrid, Spain

12 July 2010
Test match

Pakistan	4 – 0	France
Tousiq 12', 30'; Butt 23'; Abbasi 53'	Report

Madrid, Spain

15 July 2010
Test match

Pakistan	1 – 1	Spain
Butt 57'	Report	Quemada 51'

Madrid, Spain

==== 2010 Series – Netherlands ====
18 July 2010
Test match

Netherlands	1 – 4	Pakistan
	Report	Waqas 11'; Tousiq 29', 52'; Imran 43'

Amstelveen, Netherlands

Stadium: Wagener Stadium

19 July 2010
Test match

Netherlands	3 – 2	Pakistan
van der Weerden 13'; Hertzberger 31' de Voogd 69'	Report	Butt 8'; Imran 56'

Amstelveen, Netherlands

Stadium: Wagener Stadium

==== 2010 Commonwealth Games ====
5 October 2010
Pool stage

Pakistan	3 – 0	Scotland
Abbasi 20'; Butt 25'; Imran 43'	Report

New Delhi, India

Stadium: Major Dhyan Chand National Stadium

6 October 2010
Pool stage

Pakistan	4 – 1	Malaysia
Imran 17'; Abbasi 38'; Butt 43'; Waqas 65'	Report	Rahim 32'

New Delhi, India

Stadium: Major Dhyan Chand National Stadium

9 October 2010
Pool stage

Pakistan	0 – 1	Australia
	Report	Ciriello 33'

New Delhi, India

Stadium: Major Dhyan Chand National Stadium

10 October 2010
Pool stage

Pakistan	4 – 7	India
Imran 27'; Rizwan 29'; Irfan 58'; Abbasi 68'	Report	Sandeep 3', 11'; Shivendra 19', 59'; Saravanjit 20'; Mujtaba 41'; Dharamvir 45'

New Delhi, India

Stadium: Major Dhyan Chand National Stadium

12 October 2010
Fifth and sixth place

Pakistan	2 – 3 (a.e.t.)	South Africa
Butt 28', 53'	Report	Reid-Ross 55', 75'; Carr 62'

New Delhi, India

Stadium: Major Dhyan Chand National Stadium

==== 2010 Asian Games ====
17 November 2010
Pool stage

Pakistan	12 – 0	Hong Kong
Butt 2', 58'; Abbas 8', 29'; Fareed 22'; Waqas 24', 50', 53'; Haseem 31', 55'; Imran 35', 61'	Report

Guangzhou, China

Stadium: Aoti Hockey Field

18 November 2010
Pool stage

Japan	2 – 8	Pakistan
Kitazato 3'; Tsubouchi 66'	Report	Fareed 4'; Abbas 20', 51'; Rizwan 29'; Waqas 55'; Imran 61'; Abbasi 64'; Zubair 70'

Guangzhou, China

Stadium: Aoti Hockey Field

20 November 2010
Pool stage

India	3 – 2	Pakistan
Sandeep 3', 48'; Dharamvir 16'	Report	Butt 4'; Abbasi 43'

Guangzhou, China

Stadium: Aoti Hockey Field

21 November 2010
Pool stage

Pakistan	6 – 1	Bangladesh
Abbasi 13', 27'; Abbas 15', 29'; Imran 37', 48'	Report	Barmon 63'

Guangzhou, China

Stadium: Aoti Hockey Field

23 November 2010
Semifinal

South Korea	1 – 1 (a.e.t.)	Pakistan
Kang Moon-kyu 39'		Waqas 22'
Penalties
Lee Nam-yong (penalty shoot-out missed); Nam Hyun-woo (penalty shoot-out scored); Hyun Hye-sung (penalty shoot-out missed); Yeo Woon-kon (penalty shoot-out scored); Jang Jong-hyun (penalty shoot-out scored) --- Jang Jong-hyun (penalty shoot-out missed); Yeo Woon-kon (penalty shoot-out missed)	3–4	(penalty shoot-out scored) Abbas; (penalty shoot-out missed) Irfan; (penalty shoot-out missed) Imran; (penalty shoot-out scored) Haseem; (penalty shoot-out scored) Abbasi --- (penalty shoot-out missed) Abbas; (penalty shoot-out scored) Haseem

Guangzhou, China

Stadium: Aoti Hockey Field

25 November 2010
Final

Pakistan	2 – 0	Malaysia
Abbas 26'; Butt 38'	Report

Guangzhou, China

Stadium: Aoti Hockey Field

=== 2011 ===
==== 2011 Sultan Azlan Shah Cup ====
5 May 2011
Pool stage

New Zealand	2 – 4	Pakistan
Hayward 59'; Inglis 63'	Report	Rizwan Sr. 3'; Shah 24'; Haseem 51'; Bhutta 61'

Ipoh, Malaysia

Stadium: Azlan Shah Stadium

6 May 2011
Pool stage

Pakistan	4 – 2	South Korea
Butt 21'; Abbas 63'; Haseem 64'; Akbar 70'	Report	Hyun 13', 46'

Ipoh, Malaysia

Stadium: Azlan Shah Stadium

8 May 2011
Pool stage

Great Britain	3 – 2	Pakistan
Moore 8'; Clarke 39', 63'	Report	Abbas 31'; Haseem 64'

Ipoh, Malaysia

Stadium: Azlan Shah Stadium

9 May 2011
Pool stage

Pakistan	1 – 5	Australia
Abbas 28'	Report	Orchard 23', 41'; Wilson 34', 55'; Ciriello 51'

Ipoh, Malaysia

Stadium: Azlan Shah Stadium

11 May 2011
Pool stage

India	1 – 3	Pakistan
Rupinder 22'	Report	Bhutta 49'; Imran 56'; Abbas 57'

Ipoh, Malaysia

Stadium: Azlan Shah Stadium

14 May 2011
Pool stage

Pakistan	3 – 2	Malaysia
Abbas 15'; Waqas 21'; Abbasi 51'	Report	Hafifihafiz 35'; Razie 57'

Ipoh, Malaysia

Stadium: Azlan Shah Stadium

15 May 2011

Australia	3 – 2 (a.e.t.)	Pakistan
Ciriello 11', 83'; Turner 44'	Report	Abbas 31'; Butt 62'

Ipoh, Malaysia

Stadium: Azlan Shah Stadium

==== 2011 UCD Four Nations ====
20 June 2011
Pool stage

Pakistan	2 – 4	France
Rizwan Sr. 42'; Tousiq 66'	Report	Pauchet 21'; Genestet 30'; Sanchez 39'; Catonnet 57'

Dublin, Ireland

Stadium: Dublin National Hockey Stadium

22 June 2011
Pool stage

China	2 – 3	Pakistan
Liu 6'; Sun 32'	Report	Abbas 10'; Haseem 27'; Zubair 38'

Dublin, Ireland

Stadium: Dublin National Hockey Stadium

24 June 2011
Pool stage

Ireland	1 – 2	Pakistan
Watt 41'	Report	Ahmed 24'; Abbas 28'

Dublin, Ireland

Stadium: Dublin National Hockey Stadium

25 June 2011
Final

Pakistan	2 – 1	Ireland
Abbas 40', 57'	Report	Jermyn 54'

Dublin, Ireland

Stadium: Dublin National Hockey Stadium

==== 2011 Hockey RaboTrophy ====
29 June 2011
Match 3

England	2 – 2	Pakistan
Smith 64'; Middleton 68'	Report	Abbas 8'; Abbasi 68'

Amsterdam, Netherlands

Stadium: Wagener Stadium

1 July 2011
Match 2

Germany	2 – 1	Pakistan
Montag 35'; Fürste 44'	Report	Zubair 2'

Amsterdam, Netherlands

Stadium: Wagener Stadium

2 July 2011
Match 3

Netherlands	4 – 0	Pakistan
Hertzberger 10', 57'; Weusthof 27', 35+'	Report

Amsterdam, Netherlands

Stadium: Wagener Stadium

==== International match – New Zealand ====
6 July 2011
Test match

Pakistan	4 – 1	New Zealand
Abbasi 9', 21'; Haseem 43'; Abbas 56'	Report

Amsterdam, Netherlands

Stadium: Wagener Stadium

==== 2011 Series – Belgium ====
8 July 2011
Test match

Belgium	0 – 1	Pakistan
	Report	Abbasi 39'

Brussels, Belgium

Stadium: Victory Facility Ground

9 July 2011
Test match

Belgium	4 – 1	Pakistan
Dekeyser 13', 28', 57' van Aubel 67'	Report	Tousiq 49'

Antwerp, Belgium

Stadium: Braxgata Hockey Club

==== 2011 Series – Netherlands ====
15 July 2011
Test match

Netherlands	2 – 2	Pakistan
	Report	Rashid 22'; Abbas 69'

Amstelveen, Netherlands

Stadium: Wagener Stadium

16 July 2011
Test match

Netherlands	2 – 1	Pakistan
	Report	Abbas 24'

Amstelveen, Netherlands

Stadium: Wagener Stadium

==== 2011 Asian Champions Trophy ====
3 September 2011
Pool stage

Pakistan	3 – 2	Malaysia
Haseem 22'; Imran 32'; Abbasi 63'	Report	Amin 4'; Ahmad 34'

Ordos, China

Stadium: Ordos Hockey Stadium

4 September 2011
Pool stage

Pakistan	4 – 1	China
Abbasi 34', 68'; Bhutta 46'; Rasool 49'	Report	Xiantang 35'

Ordos, China

Stadium: Ordos Hockey Stadium

6 September 2011
Pool stage

Japan	3 – 1	Pakistan
Kayukawa 35+'; Tanaka 62', 64'	Report	Rizwan Jr. 5'

Ordos, China

Stadium: Ordos Hockey Stadium

7 September 2011
Pool stage

Pakistan	3 – 2	South Korea
Waqas 7'; Irfan 13'; Rasool 57'	Report	Suk-hoon 43'; Hyun-woo 53'

Ordos, China

Stadium: Ordos Hockey Stadium

9 September 2011
Pool stage

India	2 – 2	Pakistan
Rupinder 46'; Danish 53'	Report	Waqas 40'; Irfan 43'

Ordos, China

Stadium: Ordos Hockey Stadium

11 September 2011
Final

Pakistan	0 – 0 (a.e.t.)	India
	Report
Penalties
Haseem (penalty shoot-out missed); Rizwan Jr. (penalty shoot-out scored); Rasool (penalty shoot-out missed); Wasim (penalty shoot-out scored)	2–4	(penalty shoot-out missed) Gurwinder; (penalty shoot-out scored) Danish; (penalty shoot-out scored) Rajpal; (penalty shoot-out scored) Yuvraj; (penalty shoot-out scored) Sarvanjit

Ordos, China

Stadium: Ordos Hockey Stadium

==== Perth Tri Nations Challenge ====
27 October 2011
Match 1

Australia	3 – 1	Pakistan
Dwyer 34'; Wilson 40'; Turner 45'	Report	Abbasi 39'

Busselton, Australia

Stadium: Busselton Hockey Stadium

28 October 2011
Match 2

India	3 – 3	Pakistan
Khandekar 5'; Mujtaba 16'; Rupinder 27'	Report	Abbas 46', 64'; Abbasi 65'

Busselton, Australia

Stadium: Busselton Hockey Stadium

30 October 2011
Match 3

Australia	8 – 2	Pakistan
Govers 9', 59', 68'; Ford 10'; Simpson 22'; Ockenden 38'; Dancer 53', 70'	Report	Abbas 13', 25'

Bunbury, Australia

Stadium: Bunbury Hockey Stadium

1 November 2011
Match 4

Pakistan	1 – 1	India
Abbas 2'	Report	Walmiki 26'

Bunbury, Australia

Stadium: Bunbury Hockey Stadium

3 November 2011
Final

Australia	3 – 4	Pakistan
Orchard 15'; Ciriello 45', 69'	Report	Abbas 23'; Tousiq 27', 58'; Abbasi 66'

Perth, Australia

Stadium: Perth Hockey Stadium

==== 2011 Hockey Champions Trophy ====
3 December 2011
Pool stage

Great Britain	2 – 1	Pakistan
Pearn 45'; S. Mantell 65'	Report	Imran 31'

Auckland, New Zealand

Stadium: North Harbour Hockey Stadium

5 December 2011
Pool stage

Spain	4 – 2	Pakistan
Freixa 2'; Dabanch 25'; Quemada 57', 65'	Report	Abbasi 9'; Abbas 41'

Auckland, New Zealand

Stadium: North Harbour Hockey Stadium

6 December 2011
Pool stage

Australia	6 – 1	Pakistan
Dwyer 22', 45', 48'; Ockenden 31'; Doerner 40'; Paterson 53'	Report	Tousiq 64'

Auckland, New Zealand

Stadium: North Harbour Hockey Stadium

8 December 2011
Second round

Pakistan	6 – 2	South Korea
Imran 15', 69'; Haseem 16', 61'; Ahmed 63'; Rasool 63'	Report	Lee N. 7'; Nam 27'

Auckland, New Zealand

Stadium: North Harbour Hockey Stadium

10 December 2011
Second round

Germany	5 – 0	Pakistan
Matania 13'; Montag 26'; Weß 42'; Fuchs 49'; Fürk 62'	Report

Auckland, New Zealand

Stadium: North Harbour Hockey Stadium

11 December 2011
Seventh and eighth place

Pakistan	5 – 4 (a.e.t.)	South Korea
Rizwan Sr. 6', 75'; Imran 27'; Tousiq 34'; Haseem 44'	Report	Seo 5'; Jang K. 21'; You 54', 62'

Auckland, New Zealand

Stadium: North Harbour Hockey Stadium

=== 2012 ===
==== 2012 Sultan Azlan Shah Cup ====
24 May 2012
Pool stage

Pakistan	4 – 2	Argentina
Irfan 34'; Abbas 50'; Haseem 65'; Waqas 69'	Report	Peillat 53'; Paredes 62'

Ipoh, Malaysia

Stadium: Azlan Shah Stadium

27 May 2012
Pool stage

New Zealand	3 – 1	Pakistan
Archibald 8'; Hayward 11'; Wilson 40'	Report	Haseem 44'

Ipoh, Malaysia

Stadium: Azlan Shah Stadium

28 May 2012
Pool stage

Pakistan	0 – 4	South Korea
	Report	Nam 18', 44'; You 49'; Hyun H. 61'

Ipoh, Malaysia

Stadium: Azlan Shah Stadium

30 May 2012
Pool stage

Malaysia	3 – 2	Pakistan
Amir 35'; Faizal 48'; Razie 70'	Report	Bhutta 4'; Rasool 12'

Ipoh, Malaysia

Stadium: Azlan Shah Stadium

31 May 2012
Pool stage

India	2 – 1	Pakistan
Sandeep 31'; Sunil 69'	Report	Abbas 60'

Ipoh, Malaysia

Stadium: Azlan Shah Stadium

2 June 2012
Pool stage

Pakistan	1 – 2	Great Britain
Haseem 15'	Report	Middleton 47'; Jackson 66'

Ipoh, Malaysia

Stadium: Azlan Shah Stadium

==== International match – Belgium ====
11 June 2012
Test match

Belgium	6 – 1	Pakistan
Dekeyser 26', 39', 55'; Dohmen 52', 58'; Denayer 69'	Report	Abbas 42'

Antwerp, Belgium

Stadium: KHC Dragons

==== 2012 Series – Germany ====
13 June 2012
Test match

Germany	3 – 4	Pakistan
Montag 5'; Zeller 17'; Stralkowski 60'	Report	Abbas 23', 41', 52', 58'

Cologne, Germany

Stadium: KTHC Stadion Rot-Weiss

14 June 2012
Test match

Germany	2 – 0	Pakistan
Stalkowski 9'; Fürste 62'	Report

Cologne, Germany

Stadium: KTHC Stadion Rot-Weiss

==== Unofficial match – Netherlands ====
15 June 2012
Practice match

Netherlands	3 – 3	Pakistan
	Report	Rizwan Jr. 26'; Waqas 39'; Shan 44'

Zoetermeer, Netherlands

MHC Zoetermeer

==== 2012 Summer Olympics ====
30 July 2012
Pool stage

Spain	1 – 1	Pakistan
Quemada 47'	Report	Butt 46'

London, England

Stadium: Riverbank Arena

1 August 2012
Pool stage

Pakistan	2 – 0	Argentina
Imran 30'; Abbas 44'	Report

London, England

Stadium: Riverbank Arena

3 August 2012
Pool stage

Great Britain	4 – 1	Pakistan
Tindall 4'; Clarke 26'; Jackson 50', 67'	Report	Abbas 70'

London, England

Stadium: Riverbank Arena

5 August 2012
Pool stage

Pakistan	5 – 4	South Africa
Haseem 20', 26'; Rasool 23'; Abbas 64'; Ahmed 67'	Report	McDade 2'; Reid-Ross 22', 35'; Paton 48'

London, England

Stadium: Riverbank Arena

7 August 2012
Pool stage

Australia	7 – 0	Pakistan
de Young 5'; Knowles 6'; Ciriello 29', 34'; Ford 42'; Dwyer 48'; Turner 70'	Report

London, England

Stadium: Riverbank Arena

9 August 2012
Seventh and eighth place

Pakistan	3 – 2	South Korea
Waqas 11'; Haseem 44'; Imran 61'	Report	Hye-sung 30', 33'

London, England

Stadium: Riverbank Arena

==== 2012 Hockey Champions Trophy ====
1 December 2012
Pool stage

Netherlands	3 – 1	Pakistan
De Wijn 31', 45'; Hertzberger 56'	Report	Waqas 17'

Melbourne, Australia

Stadium: Melbourne Sports Centre

2 December 2012
Pool stage

Belgium	0 – 2	Pakistan
	Report	Haseem 56'; Rasool 69'

Melbourne, Australia

Stadium: Melbourne Sports Centre

4 December 2012
Pool stage

Australia	1 – 0	Pakistan
Govers 51'	Report

Melbourne, Australia

Stadium: Melbourne Sports Centre

6 December 2012
Quarterfinal

Germany	1 – 2	Pakistan
Fürste 9'	Report	Abbasi 39', 50'

Melbourne, Australia

Stadium: Melbourne Sports Centre

8 December 2012
Semifinal

Pakistan	2 – 5	Netherlands
Jenniskens 23(o.g)' Abbasi 70+'	Report	Bakker 2', 32'; Van Ass 20'; Verga 46'; Kempermann 61'

Melbourne, Australia

Stadium: Melbourne Sports Centre

9 December 2012
Third and fourth place

India	2 – 3	Pakistan
Raghunath 7'; Rupinder 70+'	Report	Rizwan Sr. 21'; Rasool 41'; Ateeq 67'

Melbourne, Australia

Stadium: Melbourne Sports Centre

==== 2012 Asian Champions Trophy ====
20 December 2012
Pool stage

Oman	3 – 8	Pakistan
Rajab 14', 57'; Bait Jandal 20'	Report	Rizwan 2'; Waqas 30', 63'; Abbasi 39', 61', 68'; Haseem 51'; Imran 54'

Doha, Qatar

Stadium: Al-Ryaan Stadium

21 December 2012
Pool stage

Pakistan	5 – 2	China
Waqas 9', 33'; Abbasi 23'; Haseem 53', 69'	Report	Yu Yang 10'; Liu Yixian 25'

Doha, Qatar

Stadium: Al-Ryaan Stadium

23 December 2012
Pool stage

Pakistan	3 – 3	Malaysia
Rizwan 21'; Waqas 55', 57'	Report	20'; Faizal 43'; Tengku 68'

Doha, Qatar

Stadium: Al-Ryaan Stadium

24 December 2012
Pool stage

Pakistan	1 – 2	India
Waqas 56'	Report	Rupinder 36'; Chinglensana 49'

Doha, Qatar

Stadium: Al-Ryaan Stadium

26 December 2012
Pool stage

Pakistan	5 – 2	Japan
Waqas 1', 36'; Abbasi 34'; Haseem 44', 63'	Report	Yoshihara 8'; Tachibana 23'

Doha, Qatar

Stadium: Al-Ryaan Stadium

27 December 2012
Final

India	4 – 5	Pakistan
Sunil 8'; Raghunath 21'; Gurwinder 55'; Rupinder 59'	Report	Waqas 7', 56'; Rasool 42'; Mehmood 48'; Ateeq 64'

Doha, Qatar

Stadium: Al-Ryaan Stadium

=== 2013 ===
==== 2013 Sultan Azlan Shah Cup ====
9 March 2013
Pool stage

New Zealand	3 – 4	Pakistan
Russell 30'; Tarrant 52'; Hayward 56'	Report	Imran 19', 28', 58'; Haseem 21'

Ipoh, Malaysia

Stadium: Azlan Shah Stadium

10 March 2013
Pool stage

Australia	6 – 0	Pakistan
Mirecki 8'; Gohdes 9'; Whetton 17', 34'; Beale 45'; Budgeon 61'	Report

Ipoh, Malaysia

Stadium: Azlan Shah Cup

12 March 2013
Pool stage

India	3 – 1	Pakistan
Rupinder 5'; Akashdeep 9'; Mandeep 56'	Report	Waqas 4'

Ipoh, Malaysia

Stadium: Azlan Shah Stadium

14 March 2013
Pool stage

Malaysia	2 – 2	Pakistan
Saari 6'; Razie 53'	Report	Imran 15'; Shan 62'

Ipoh, Malaysia

Stadium: Azlan Shah Stadium

16 March 2013
Pool stage

South Korea	2 – 2	Pakistan
Hyun Hye-Sung 39'; 53'	Report	Hussain 17'; Haseem 47'

Ipoh, Malaysia

Stadium: Azlan Shah Stadium

17 March 2013
Fifth and sixth place

Pakistan	2 – 4	India
Imran 8'; Shah 46'	Report	Rupinder 10', 62'; Akashdeep 35'; Malak 43'

Ipoh, Malaysia

Stadium: Azlan Shah Stadium

==== 2012–13 Hockey World League Semifinals ====
29 June 2013
Pool stage

Pakistan	4 – 4	Malaysia
Haseem 26'; Tousiq 42'; Abbasi 56'; Imran 61'	Report	Razie 3', 7'; Marhan 18'; Ahmad 38'

Johor Bahru, Malaysia

Stadium: Taman Daya Hockey Stadium

30 June 2013
Pool stage

Pakistan	2 – 2	England
Imran 18'; Haseem 50'	Report	Willars 13'; Dixon 25'

Johor Bahru, Malaysia

Stadium: Taman Daya Hockey Stadium

2 July 2013
Pool stage

South Africa	2 – 6	Pakistan
W. Paton 25'; Haley 69'	Report	Zubair 13'; Rasool 17'; Haseem 27', 41', 60'; Abbasi 63'

Johor Bahru, Malaysia

Stadium: Taman Daya Hockey Stadium

4 July 2013
Quarterfinal

Pakistan	3 – 4	South Korea
Waqas 5'; Tousiq 16'; Abbasi 43'	Report	Kang Moon-kweon 30', 39'; Nam Hyun-woo 48'; Kim Young-jin 49'

Johor Bahru, Malaysia

Stadium: Taman Daya Hockey Stadium

6 July 2013
Crossover

Malaysia	3 – 1	Pakistan
Razie 14'; 19'; Ahmad 38'	Report	Rasool 16'

Johor Bahru, Malaysia

Stadium: Taman Daya Hockey Stadium

7 July 2013
Seventh and eighth place

South Africa	2 – 6	Pakistan
Drummond 62'; Norris-Jones 64'	Report	Waqas 22'; Rizwan 37'; Shahzad 39'; Haseem 41', 66'; Bilgrami 53'

Johor Bahru, Malaysia

Stadium: Taman Daya Hockey Stadium

==== 2013 Hockey Asia Cup ====
24 August 2013
Pool stage

Pakistan	7 – 0	Japan
Waqas 12', 20'; Haseem 22'; Tousiq 25', 35+'; Imran 33', 70+'	Report

Ipoh, Malaysia

Stadium: Azlan Shah Stadium

25 August 2013
Pool stage

Pakistan	4 – 1	Malaysia
Zubair 32'; Dilber 46'; Waqas 60'; Rasool 67'	Report	Razie 26'

Ipoh, Malaysia

Stadium: Azlan Shah Stadium

27 August 2013
Pool stage

Pakistan	13 – 0	Chinese Taipei
Abbasi 13'; Imran 23', 52'; Rizwan 26', 38'; Rasool 39', 47'; Dilber 45'; Haseem 54', 56', 69'; Tousiq 60'; Irfan 67'	Report

Ipoh, Malaysia

Stadium: Azlan Shah Stadium

30 August 2013
Semifinal

Pakistan	1 – 2	South Korea
Imran 46'	Report	Jang Jong-Hyun 31'; Lee Nam-Yong 40'

Ipoh, Malaysia

Stadium: Azlan Shah Stadium

1 September 2013
Third and fourth place

Pakistan	3 – 1	Malaysia
Haseem 35', 56'; Imran 54'	Report	Faizal 34'

Ipoh, Malaysia

Stadium: Azlan Shah Stadium

==== International match – Argentina ====
23 October 2013
Test match

Pakistan	3 – 3	Argentina
	Report

Perth, Australia

Stadium: Perth Hockey Stadium

==== International match – Australia ====
24 October 2013
Test match

Australia	4 – 2	Pakistan
Dwyer 2'; Ciriello 39', 57', 68'	Report	Tousiq 53'; Ammad 70'

Perth, Australia

Stadium: Perth Hockey Stadium

==== 2013 Asian Champions Trophy ====
2 November 2013
Pool stage

Pakistan	8 – 0	Oman
Hussain 16', 52'; Imran 31', 41', 64'; Dilber 34', 53'; Tousiq 46'	Report

Kakamigahara, Japan

Stadium: Gifu Hockey Stadium

3 November 2013
Pool stage

Pakistan	5 – 1	China
Imran 21', 34'; Haseem 31'; Rizwan Sr. 40'; Dilber 42'	Report	Zhang Zhixuan 18'

Kakamigahara, Japan

Stadium: Gifu Hockey Stadium

5 November 2013
Pool stage

Malaysia	0 – 1	Pakistan
	Report	Rasool 70'

Kakamigahara, Japan

Stadium: Gifu Hockey Stadium

7 November 2013
Pool stage

India	4 – 5	Pakistan
Gurjinder 24'; Amit 30'; Manpreet 40'; Malak 49'	Report	Haseem 2'; Imran 35'; Rizwan Sr. 36', 44'; Rizwan Jr. 53'

Kakamigahara, Japan

Stadium: Gifu Hockey Stadium

8 November 2013
Pool stage

Pakistan	2 – 2	Japan
Haseem 34'; Rizwan Jr. 40'	Report	Kayukawa 23'; Yamabe 42'

Kakamigahara, Japan

Stadium: Gifu Hockey Stadium

10 November 2013
Final

Pakistan	3 – 1	Japan
Rizwan Sr. 40'; Haseem 61'; Ammad 65'	Report	K. Kawakami 11'

Kakamigahara, Japan

Stadium: Gifu Hockey Stadium

=== 2014 ===
==== 2014 Asian Games ====
20 September 2014
Pool stage

Pakistan	14 – 0	Sri Lanka
Waqas 1'; Imran 2', 19', 25', 54'; Irfan 12', 14'; Rizwan Sr. 20', 45', 47'; Bhutta 21', 29', 39'; Tousiq 41'	Report

Incheon, South Korea

Stadium: Seonhak Hockey Stadium

21 September 2014
Pool stage

Pakistan	2 – 0	China
Haseem 42'; Dilber 55'	Report

Incheon, South Korea

Stadium: Seonhak Hockey Stadium

25 September 2014
Pool stage

India	1 – 2	Pakistan
Thimmaiah 53'	Report	Bhutta 38'; Waqas 54'

Incheon, South Korea

Stadium: Seonhak Hockey Stadium

27 September 2014
Pool stage

Oman	0 – 8	Pakistan
	Report	Imran 15', 43'; Dilber 17'; Irfan 20', 60'; Haseem 23', 47'; Bhutta 38'

Incheon, South Korea

Stadium: Seonhak Hockey Stadium

30 September 2014
Semifinal

Pakistan	0 – 0	Malaysia
	Report
Penalties
Rizwan Sr. (penalty shoot-out missed); Waqas (penalty shoot-out scored); Haseem (penalty shoot-out scored); Mehmood (penalty shoot-out scored); Bhutta (penalty shoot-out missed); Haseem (penalty shoot-out scored); Waqas (penalty shoot-out scored); Mehmood (penalty shoot-out scored)	6–5	(penalty shoot-out missed) Tajuddin; (penalty shoot-out missed) Ashaari; (penalty shoot-out scored) Jalil; (penalty shoot-out scored) Saabah; (penalty shoot-out scored) Saari; (penalty shoot-out scored) Saari; (penalty shoot-out scored) Saabah; (penalty shoot-out missed) Tajuddin

Incheon, South Korea

Stadium: Seonhak Hockey Stadium

2 October 2014
Final

India	1 – 1	Pakistan
Kothajit 27'	Report	Rizwan Sr. 3'
Penalties
A. Singh (penalty shoot-out scored); R.P. Singh (penalty shoot-out scored); M. Singh (penalty shoot-out missed); Lakra (penalty shoot-out scored); D. Singh (penalty shoot-out scored)	4–2	(penalty shoot-out missed) Haseem; (penalty shoot-out scored) Waqas; (penalty shoot-out missed) Bhutta; (penalty shoot-out scored) Rasool

Incheon, South Korea

Stadium: Seonhak Hockey Stadium

==== 2014 Hockey Champions Trophy ====
6 December 2014
Pool stage

Belgium	2 – 1	Pakistan
Cosyns 12'; Briels 44'	Report	Imran 36'

Bhubaneswar, India

Stadium: Kalinga Stadium

7 December 2014
Pool stage

England	8 – 2	Pakistan
Gleghorne 15'; Catlin 17'; Condon 19'; Middleton 24'; Jackson 26'; Ward 45'; Brogdon 48'; Griffiths 59'	Report	Qadir 57'; Irfan 60'

Bhubaneswar, India

Stadium: Kalinga Stadium

9 December 2014
Pool stage

Australia	3 – 0	Pakistan
Hayward 23', 54'; Whetton 59'	Report

Bhubaneswar, India

Stadium: Kalinga Stadium

11 December 2014
Quarterfinal

Netherlands	2 – 4	Pakistan
Hertzberger 6'; Jonker 39'	Report	Bhutta 16'; Imran 30'; Irfan 51', 52'

Bhubaneswar, India

Stadium: Kalinga Stadium

13 December 2014
Semifinal

India	3 – 4	Pakistan
Gurjinder 12'; Dharamvir 38'; Thimmaiah 44'	Report	Qadir 17', 59'; Waqas 32'; Irfan 44'

Bhubaneswar, India

Stadium: Kalinga Stadium

14 December 2014
Final

Germany	2 – 0	Pakistan
Wesley 18'; Fuchs 58'	Report

Bhubaneswar, India

Stadium: Kalinga Stadium
