= 2012–13 Men's FIH Hockey World League Semifinals =

Field hockey tournament

The 2012–13 Men's FIH Hockey World League Semifinals took place from June to July 2013. A total of 16 teams competing in 2 events were part in this round of the tournament playing for 7 berths in the Final, played between 10 and 18 January 2014 in New Delhi, India.

This round also served as the qualifier for the 2014 Men's Hockey World Cup as the 6 highest placed teams apart from the host nation and the five continental champions qualified.

== Qualification ==
8 teams ranked between 1st and 8th in the FIH World Rankings current at the time of seeking entries for the competition qualified automatically. After Germany announced they would not be able host a Semifinal due to financial restrictions, Malaysia was chosen to do so therefore exempt from Round 2, to which were qualified by ranking basis. For this reason one less berth was available at that event and only 7 teams qualified from Round 2. France (17th) qualified as the highest-ranked second-placed team between the Saint-Germain-en-Laye and Elektrostal Round 2 events, leaving Russia (20th) unable to qualify. The following sixteen teams, shown with final pre-tournament rankings, competed in this round of the tournament.

Dates	Event	Location	Quotas	Qualifier(s)
	Ranked 1st to 8th in the FIH World Rankings		8	Australia (2); Germany (1); Netherlands (3); England (4); Spain (7); South Korea (8); New Zealand (6); Pakistan (5)
	Host nation		1	Malaysia (13)
18–24 February 2013	2012–13 FIH Hockey World League Round 2	New Delhi, India	2	India (11); Ireland (15)
27 February–5 March 2013	2012–13 FIH Hockey World League Round 2	Rio de Janeiro, Brazil	2	Argentina (10); South Africa (12)
6–12 May 2013	2012–13 FIH Hockey World League Round 2	Saint-Germain-en-Laye, France	2	Belgium (9); France (17)
27 May–2 June 2013	2012–13 FIH Hockey World League Round 2	Elektrostal, Russia	1	Japan (16)
Total			16	

== Rotterdam ==

Tournament details
- Host country: Netherlands
- City: Rotterdam
- Dates: 13–23 June 2013
- Teams: 8
- Venue: HC Rotterdam

Final positions
- Champions: Belgium
- Runner-up: Australia
- Third place: Netherlands

Tournament statistics
- Matches played: 24
- Goals scored: 130 (5.42 per match)
- Top scorer: (Netherlands) Jeroen Hertzberger (11 goals)

=== Umpires ===
Below are the 10 umpires appointed by the International Hockey Federation:

- Bruce Bale (ENG)
- Fernando Gómez (ARG)
- Kim Hong-lae (KOR)
- Satoshi Kondo (JPN)
- Lim Hong Zhen (SIN)
- Germán Montes de Oca (ARG)
- Deon Nel (RSA)
- Tim Pullman (AUS)
- Simon Taylor (NZL)
- Roderick Wijsmuller (NED)

=== First round ===
==== Pool A ====
Pos	Team	Pld	W	D	L	GF	GA	GD	Pts
1	Belgium	3	2	1	0	7	2	+5	7
2	Australia	3	2	0	1	13	6	+7	6
3	Spain	3	1	1	1	7	8	−1	4
4	France	3	0	0	3	3	14	−11	0

Source: FIH
Rules for classification: 1) points; 2) goal difference; 3) goals scored; 4) head-to-head result.

14 June 2013
09:00

Spain	4–2	France
D. Alegre 18'; Lleonart 20'; Mir 22'; Oliva 52'	Report	Lockwood 51'; H. Genestet 56'

Umpires:
Roderick Wijsmuller (NED)
Bruce Bale (ENG)

14 June 2013
11:00

Australia	1–3	Belgium
Ford 63'	Report	Dockier 1'; Charlier 17'; Dohmen 65'

Umpires:
Simon Taylor (NZL)
Fernando Gomez (ARG)

- During the pre-game formalities, New Zealand's national anthem was accidentally played instead of Australia's national anthem, playing for 25 seconds before audio staff realised the mistake and stopped the music.

15 June 2013
11:30

Spain	2–5	Australia
Tubau 38'; Dabanch 70'	Report	Govers 12'; Ciriello 34'; Brown 45'; Ford 47'; Hammond 50'

Umpires:
Simon Taylor (NZL)
Roderick Wijsmuller (NED)

15 June 2013
14:00

Belgium	3–0	France
Luypaert 8'; Truyens 51'; Boon 70'	Report

Umpires:
Satoshi Kondo (JPN)
Kim Hong-lae (KOR)

17 June 2013
12:30

Australia	7–1	France
Dwyer 9', 14', 24', 41', 55'; Govers 34'; Swann 48'	Report	Sevestre 32'

Umpires:
Roderick Wijsmuller (NED)
Lim Hong Zhen (SIN)

17 June 2013
14:30

Belgium	1–1	Spain
33'	Report	D. Alegre 58'

Umpires:
Deon Nel (RSA)
Germán Montes de Oca (ARG)

==== Pool B ====
Pos	Team	Pld	W	D	L	GF	GA	GD	Pts
1	Netherlands	3	2	1	0	10	3	+7	7
2	New Zealand	3	1	2	0	10	8	+2	5
3	India	3	0	2	1	7	9	−2	2
4	Ireland	3	0	1	2	6	13	−7	1

Source: FIH
Rules for classification: 1) points; 2) goal difference; 3) goals scored; 4) head-to-head result.

13 June 2013
15:30

India	4–4	Ireland
Akashdeep 21'; Rupinder Pal 40', 66'; Shivendra 47'	Report	Sothern 25'; Gleghorne 30'; C. Harte 57'; McConnell 64'

Umpires:
Germán Montes de Oca (ARG)
Satoshi Kondo (JPN)

13 June 2013
20:00

Netherlands	3–3	New Zealand
Hertzberger 19', 55'; Verga 57'	Report	Inglis 20', 32'; Smith 46'

Umpires:
Tim Pullman (AUS)
Kim Hong-lae (KOR)

15 June 2013
09:30

New Zealand	4–2	Ireland
Burrows 23'; Haig 47'; Hilton 54'; Hayward 65'	Report	Sothern 18'; Watt 48'

Umpires:
Germán Montes de Oca (ARG)
Lim Hong Zhen (SIN)

15 June 2013
16:30

Netherlands	2–0	India
Bakker 2'; Hertzberger 18'	Report

Umpires:
Deon Nel (RSA)
Tim Pullman (AUS)

17 June 2013
17:00

India	3–3	New Zealand
Mandeep 46'; Raghunath 47'; Kothajit 53'	Report	Child 6'; Jenness 51'; Hilton 66'

Umpires:
Tim Pullman (AUS)
Fernando Gómez (ARG)

17 June 2013
20:00

Netherlands	5–0	Ireland
Hofman 12', 59'; Jonker 26'; Hertzberger 57', 70+'	Report

Umpires:
Kim Hong-lae (KOR)
Bruce Bale (ENG)

=== Second round ===
Quarter-finals
19 June 2013
Belgium	6
Ireland	3
19 June 2013
New Zealand	1
Spain	0
19 June 2013
Australia	5
India	1
19 June 2013
Netherlands	8
France	4

Semi-finals
21 June 2013
Belgium	3
New Zealand	2
21 June 2013
Australia	4
Netherlands	3

Final
23 June 2013
Belgium (pen.)	7 (6)
Australia	2 (6)
Third place
23 June 2013
New Zealand	1
Netherlands	4

==== Quarterfinals ====
19 June 2013
12:30

Belgium	6–3	Ireland
Luypaert 8'; Briels 10'; 39'; Dockier 50', 59'; Boon 54'	Report	Cargo 33'; Jackson 42'; Gleghorne 57'

Umpires:
Satoshi Kondo (JPN)
Roderick Wijsmuller (NED)

19 June 2013
14:30

New Zealand	1–0	Spain
Inglis 14'	Report

Umpires:
Deon Nel (RSA)
Fernando Gómez (ARG)

19 June 2013
17:00

Australia	5–1	India
Simpson 2'; Gohdes 20'; 21'; Ford 22'; Swann 39'	Report	Chinglensana 21'

Umpires:
Simon Taylor (NZL)
Germán Montes de Oca (ARG)

19 June 2013
20:00

Netherlands	8–4	France
Hertzberger 3', 34', 53'; Jonker 7'; Verga 36'; Hofman 64'; Kemperman 67'; Caspers 70'	Report	Durchon 21'; Lockwood 24'; M. Genestet 62'; 68'

Umpires:
Lim Hong Zhen (SIN)
Bruce Bale (ENG)

==== Fifth to eighth place classification ====
Crossover
21 June 2013
Ireland	0
Spain	1
21 June 2013
India	6
France	2

Fifth place match
23 June 2013
Spain (pen.)	2 (4)
India	2 (2)
Seventh place match
23 June 2013
Ireland	6
France	4

===== Crossover =====
21 June 2013
12:30

Ireland	0–1	Spain
	Report	Padros 54'

Umpires:
Fernando Gómez (ARG)
Tim Pullman (AUS)

21 June 2013
14:30

India	6–2	France
Akashdeep 13'; Raghunath 27'; Sunil 33'; Sardara 42'; Mandeep 56', 69'	Report	H. Genestet 3'; Deront 70+'

Umpires:
Lim Hong Zhen (SIN)
Satoshi Kondo (JPN)

===== Seventh and eighth place =====
22 June 2013
19:30

Ireland	6–4	France
C. Harte 42', 63'; Cockram 44'; Cargo 47'; O'Donoghue 56'; Caruth 68'	Report	M. Genestet 12'; Deront 28'; Sevestre 30'; Martin-Brisac 37'

Umpires:
Bruce Bale (ENG)
Satoshi Kondo (JPN)

===== Fifth and sixth place =====
23 June 2013
10:00

Spain	2–2	India
Oliva 2'; D. Alegre 56'	Report	Shivendra 10'; Mandeep 12'
Penalties
Pérez-Pla (penalty shoot-out scored); Dabanch (penalty shoot-out missed); D. Alegre (penalty shoot-out scored); Enrique (penalty shoot-out scored); Oliva (penalty shoot-out scored)	4–2	(penalty shoot-out scored) Shivendra; (penalty shoot-out scored) Sardara; (penalty shoot-out missed) Manpreet; (penalty shoot-out missed) Akashdeep

Umpires:
Roderick Wijsmuller (NED)
Fernando Gómez (ARG)

==== First to fourth place classification ====
===== Semifinals =====
21 June 2013
17:00

Belgium	3–2	New Zealand
Briels 5'; Boon 28', 38'	Report	Hilton 18'; Hayward 56'

Umpires:
Deon Nel (RSA)
Germán Montes de Oca (ARG)

21 June 2013
20:00

Australia	4–3	Netherlands
Ciriello 17'; Gohdes 25'; Ford 42'; Govers 56'	Report	Hertzberger 22'; Bakker 38'; Hofman 58'

Umpires:
Simon Taylor (NZL)
Kim Hong-lae (KOR)

===== Third and fourth place =====
23 June 2013
12:00

New Zealand	1–4	Netherlands
Burrows 13'	Report	Hertzberger 18', 39'; Verga 53'; Galema 69'

Umpires:
Tim Pullman (AUS)
Kim Hong-lae (KOR)

===== Final =====
23 June 2013
16:30

Belgium	2–2	Australia
Boon 49'; Dockier 59'	Report	Ciriello 21'; Ford 70'
Penalties
Charlier (penalty shoot-out missed) van Aubel (penalty shoot-out scored); Luypaert (penalty shoot-out scored) van Doren (penalty shoot-out scored); Cosyns (penalty shoot-out scored) —— van Aubel (penalty shoot-out missed); Cosyns (penalty shoot-out scored) van Doren (penalty shoot-out scored); Gougnard (penalty shoot-out scored)	7–6	(penalty shoot-out scored) Swann; (penalty shoot-out missed) Gohdes; (penalty shoot-out scored) Orchard; (penalty shoot-out scored) Mitton; (penalty shoot-out scored) Ciriello —— (penalty shoot-out missed) Swann; (penalty shoot-out scored) Orchard; (penalty shoot-out scored) Mitton; (penalty shoot-out missed) Ciriello

Umpires:
Simon Taylor (NZL)
Deon Nel (RSA)

== Johor Bahru ==

Tournament details
- Host country: Malaysia
- City: Johor Bahru
- Dates: 29 June–7 July 2013
- Teams: 8
- Venue: Taman Daya Hockey Stadium

Final positions
- Champions: Germany
- Runner-up: Argentina
- Third place: England

Tournament statistics
- Matches played: 24
- Goals scored: 122 (5.08 per match)
- Top scorer(s): (Argentina) Gonzalo Peillat (Germany) Christopher Zeller (Pakistan) Abdul Haseem Khan (7 goals)
- Best player: (Germany) Maximilian Müller

=== Umpires ===
Below are the 10 umpires appointed by the International Hockey Federation:

- Diego Barbas (ARG)
- Christian Blasch (GER)
- Hamish Jamson (ENG)
- Adam Kearns (AUS)
- Eric Koh (MAS)
- Francesco Parisi (ITA)
- Raghu Prasad (IND)
- Ayden Shrives (RSA)
- Coen Van Bunge (NED)
- Paco Vázquez (ESP)

=== First round ===
==== Pool A ====
Pos	Team	Pld	W	D	L	GF	GA	GD	Pts
1	Argentina	3	2	1	0	11	2	+9	7
2	Germany	3	2	1	0	9	2	+7	7
3	Japan	3	0	1	2	5	13	−8	1
4	South Korea	3	0	1	2	3	11	−8	1

Source: FIH
Rules for classification: 1) points; 2) goal difference; 3) goals scored; 4) head-to-head result.

29 June 2013
15:00

Germany	1–1	Argentina
Zeller 5'	Report	Peillat 61'

Umpires:
Raghu Prasad (IND)
Paco Vázquez (ESP)

29 June 2013
17:00

South Korea	3–3	Japan
Kim S. 15'; Lee N. 24'; Kang 26'	Report	Kawakami 43'; Tachibana 57'; Yoshihara 61'

Umpires:
Eric Koh (MAS)
Ayden Shrives (RSA)

30 June 2013
15:00

Argentina	7–1	Japan
Callioni 20', 35'; Paredes 29'; Peillat 47'; Vila 54'; Schickendantz 61'; Mazzilli 65'	Report	Nagasawa 70+'

Umpires:
Eric Koh (MAS)
Coen van Bunge (NED)

30 June 2013
17:00

South Korea	0–5	Germany
	Report	38'; Fürste 40'; Zeller 47'; Rühr 67', 70'

Umpires:
Adam Kearns (AUS)
Ayden Shrives (RSA)

2 July 2013
15:00

Germany	3–1	Japan
5'; Fuchs 42'; Zeller 61'	Report	Kayukawa 15'

Umpires:
Francesco Parisi (ITA)
Raghu Prasad (IND)

2 July 2013
17:00

Argentina	3–0	South Korea
Callioni 55'; Paredes 57'; Peillat 68'	Report

Umpires:
Hamish Jamson (ENG)
Eric Koh (MAS)

==== Pool B ====
Pos	Team	Pld	W	D	L	GF	GA	GD	Pts
1	Pakistan	3	1	2	0	12	8	+4	5
2	England	3	1	2	0	7	6	+1	5
3	Malaysia	3	1	1	1	11	10	+1	4
4	South Africa	3	0	1	2	9	15	−6	1

Source: FIH
Rules for classification: 1) points; 2) goal difference; 3) goals scored; 4) head-to-head result.

29 June 2013
19:00

Pakistan	4–4	Malaysia
Khan 26'; Tousiq 42'; Abbasi 56'; Imran 61'	Report	Razie 3', 7'; Marhan 18'; Ahmad 38'

Umpires:
Adam Kearns (AUS)
Francesco Parisi (ITA)

29 June 2013
21:00

England	3–3	South Africa
13'; Arnold 56'; Smith 69'	Report	Hykes 6', 11'; Drummond 65'

Umpires:
Diego Barbas (ARG)
Coen van Bunge (NED)

30 June 2013
19:00

Pakistan	2–2	England
Imran 18'; Khan 50'	Report	Willars 13'; Dixon 25'

Umpires:
Christian Blasch (GER)
Paco Vázquez (ESP)

30 June 2013
21:00

South Africa	4–6	Malaysia
Eustice 26'; W. Paton 37'; Da Graca 56'; Drummond 69'	Report	Faizal 4', 54'; Razie 15', 46'; Fitri 58'; Marhan 63'

Umpires:
Diego Barbas (ARG)
Hamish Jamson (ENG)

2 July 2013
19:00

England	2–1	Malaysia
Smith 20'; Middleton 57'	Report	Tengku 27'

Umpires:
Adam Kearns (AUS)
Ayden Shrives (RSA)

2 July 2013
21:00

South Africa	2–6	Pakistan
W. Paton 25'; Haley 69'	Report	Zubair 13'; Rasool 17'; Khan 27', 41', 60'; Abbasi 63'

Umpires:
Christian Blasch (GER)
Coen van Bunge (NED)

=== Second round ===
Quarter-finals
4 July 2013
Argentina	2
South Africa	0
4 July 2013
England	5
Japan	0
4 July 2013
Germany	6
Malaysia	0
4 July 2013
Pakistan	3
South Korea	4

Semi-finals
6 July 2013
Argentina	3
England	1
6 July 2013
Germany	3
South Korea	1

Final
7 July 2013
Argentina	2
Germany	4
Third place
7 July 2013
England	2
South Korea	1

==== Quarterfinals ====
4 July 2013
14:45

Argentina	2–0	South Africa
Peillat 27', 40'	Report

Umpires:
Francesco Parisi (ITA)
Coen van Bunge (NED)

4 July 2013
17:00

England	5–0	Japan
Gleghorne 20'; Middleton 23'; Martin 44'; Mantell 48'; Fox 56'	Report

Umpires:
Diego Barbas (ARG)
Christian Blasch (GER)

4 July 2013
19:15

Pakistan	3–4	South Korea
Waqas 5'; Tousiq 16'; Abbasi 43'	Report	Kang 30', 39'; Nam 48'; Kim Y. 49'

Umpires:
Hamish Jamson (ENG)
Paco Vázquez (ESP)

4 July 2013
21:30

Germany	6–0	Malaysia
Zeller 4', 13'; Butt 8'; Polk 8'; Fürste 16'; Stralkowski 18'	Report

Umpires:
Adam Kearns (AUS)
Ayden Shrives (RSA)

==== Fifth to eighth place classification ====
Crossover
6 July 2013
South Africa	2 (0)
Japan (pen.)	2 (1)
6 July 2013
Malaysia	3
Pakistan	1

Fifth place match
7 July 2013
Japan	1 (3)
Malaysia (pen.)	1 (4)
Seventh place match
7 July 2013
South Africa	2
Pakistan	6

===== Crossover =====
6 July 2013
14:45

South Africa	2–2	Japan
Haley 56'; W. Paton 62'	Report	Yamashita 33'; 69'
Penalties
Gonsalves (penalty shoot-out missed); Norris-Jones (penalty shoot-out missed); Haley (penalty shoot-out missed); Panther (penalty shoot-out missed); Halkett (penalty shoot-out missed)	0–1	(penalty shoot-out missed) Tachibana; (penalty shoot-out missed) Yamabe; (penalty shoot-out missed) Ono; (penalty shoot-out missed) Fujimoto; (penalty shoot-out scored) Kawakami

Umpires:
Diego Barbas (ARG)
Adam Kearns (AUS)

6 July 2013
17:00

Malaysia	3–1	Pakistan
Razie 14'; 19'; Tengku 38'	Report	Rasool 16'

Umpires:
Christian Blasch (GER)
Hamish Jamson (ENG)

===== Seventh and eighth place =====
7 July 2013
14:45

South Africa	2–6	Pakistan
Drummond 62'; Norris-Jones 64'	Report	Waqas 22'; Rizwan 37'; Shahzad 39'; Khan 41', 66'; Bilgrami 53'

Umpires:
Diego Barbas (ARG)
Eric Koh (MAS)

===== Fifth and sixth place =====
7 July 2013
17:00

Japan	1–1	Malaysia
Kawauchi 28'	Report	Razie 10'
Penalties
Nakayama (penalty shoot-out scored); Ono (penalty shoot-out scored); Yamabe (penalty shoot-out scored); Yoshihara (penalty shoot-out missed); Kawakami (penalty shoot-out missed)	3–4	(penalty shoot-out scored) Faizal; (penalty shoot-out scored) Shahrun; (penalty shoot-out missed) Faiz; (penalty shoot-out scored) Firhan; (penalty shoot-out scored) Fitri

Umpires:
Christian Blasch (GER)
Hamish Jamson (ENG)

==== First to fourth place classification ====
===== Semifinals =====
6 July 2013
19:15

Argentina	3–1	England
Callioni 3'; Garreta 7'; Peillat 11'	Report	Catlin 49'

Umpires:
Eric Koh (MAS)
Coen Van Bunge (NED)

6 July 2013
21:30

Germany	3–1	South Korea
Zeller 14'; Butt 65'; Zwicker 70'	Report	Lee N. 60'

Umpires:
Ayden Shrives (RSA)
Paco Vázquez (ESP)

===== Third and fourth place =====
7 July 2013
19:15

England	2–1	South Korea
Arnold 12'; Martin 59'	Report	Kim S. 51'

Umpires:
Adam Kearns (AUS)
Ayden Shrives (RSA)

===== Final =====
7 July 2013
21:30

Argentina	2–4	Germany
Peillat 26'; Paredes 35'	Report	Zeller 22'; Fuchs 32', 67'; Wesley 70'

Umpires:
Coen Van Bunge (NED)
Paco Vázquez (ESP)

=== Awards ===
Top Goalscorers	Player of the Tournament	Goalkeeper of the Tournament	Young Player of the Tournament
(Argentina) Gonzalo Peillat (Germany) Christopher Zeller (Pakistan) Abdul Haseem Khan	(Germany) Maximilian Müller	(South Korea) Lee Myung-ho	(Argentina) Gonzalo Peillat

== Final rankings ==
Qualification for 2014 Hockey World Cup

Rank	Rotterdam	Johor Bahru
1	Belgium	Germany
2	Australia	Argentina
3	Netherlands	England
4	New Zealand	South Korea
5	Spain	Malaysia
6	India	Japan
7	Ireland	Pakistan
8	France	South Africa

Host nation
Continental champions
Qualified through 2012–13 FIH Hockey World League

== Goalscorers ==
The following goalscorers list comprises players from both events.

There were 257 goals scored in 48 matches, for an average of 5.35 goals per match.

11 goals

- (Netherlands) Jeroen Hertzberger

7 goals

- (Argentina) Gonzalo Peillat
- (Germany) Christopher Zeller
- (Pakistan) Abdul Haseem Khan

6 goals

- (Malaysia) Razie Rahim

5 goals

- (Australia) Jamie Dwyer
- (Australia) Russell Ford
- (Belgium) Tom Boon

4 goals

- (Argentina) Facundo Callioni
- (Belgium) Sébastien Dockier
- (India) Mandeep Singh
- (Netherlands) Rogier Hofman

3 goals

- (Argentina) Matías Paredes
- (Australia) Christopher Ciriello
- (Australia) Kieran Govers
- (Germany) Florian Fuchs
- (Ireland) Conor Harte
- (Malaysia) Tengku Ahmad Tajuddin
- (Netherlands) Valentin Verga
- (New Zealand) Blair Hilton
- (New Zealand) Hugo Inglis
- (Pakistan) Shakeel Abbasi
- (South Africa) Timothy Drummond
- (South Africa) Wade Paton
- (South Korea) Kang Moon-kweon
- (Spain) David Alegre

2 goals

- (Australia) Matthew Gohdes
- (Australia) Matthew Swann
- (Belgium) Thomas Briels
- (Belgium) Loïck Luypaert
- (England) Benjamin Arnold
- (England) Harry Martin
- (England) Barry Middleton
- (England) Richard Smith
- (France) Guillaume Deront
- (France) Hugo Genestet
- (France) Martin Genestet
- (France) Viktor Lockwood
- (France) Lucas Sevestre
- (Germany) Linus Butt
- (Germany) Moritz Fürste
- (Germany) Christopher Rühr
- (India) V. R. Raghunath
- (India) Akashdeep Singh
- (India) Rupinder Pal Singh
- (India) Shivendra Singh
- (Ireland) Christopher Cargo
- (Ireland) Paul Gleghorne
- (Ireland) Alan Sothern
- (Malaysia) Marhan Jalil
- (Malaysia) Faizal Saari
- (Netherlands) Billy Bakker
- (Netherlands) Constantijn Jonker
- (New Zealand) Phillip Burrows
- (New Zealand) Andrew Hayward
- (Pakistan) Muhammad Imran
- (Pakistan) Shafqat Rasool
- (Pakistan) Muhammad Tousiq
- (Pakistan) Muhammad Waqas
- (South Africa) Craig Haley
- (South Africa) Julian Hykes
- (South Korea) Kim Seong-kyu
- (South Korea) Lee Nam-yong
- (Spain) Roc Oliva

1 goal

- (Argentina) Juan Garreta
- (Argentina) Agustín Mazzilli
- (Argentina) Guillermo Schickendantz
- (Argentina) Lucas Vila
- (Australia) Kiel Brown
- (Australia) Robert Hammond
- (Australia) Glenn Simpson
- (Belgium) Cédric Charlier
- (Belgium) John-John Dohmen
- (Belgium) Jérôme Truyens
- (England) Nicholas Catlin
- (England) Adam Dixon
- (England) Daniel Fox
- (England) Mark Gleghorne
- (England) Simon Mantell
- (England) Oliver Willars
- (France) Matthieu Durchon
- (France) Simon Martin-Brisac
- (Germany) Moritz Polk
- (Germany) Thilo Stralkowski
- (Germany) Christopher Wesley
- (Germany) Martin Zwicker
- (India) Chinglensana Singh
- (India) Kothajit Singh
- (India) Sardara Singh
- (India) S. V. Sunil
- (Ireland) Peter Caruth
- (Ireland) Timothy Cockram
- (Ireland) Jonathan Jackson
- (Ireland) Andrew McConnell
- (Ireland) Shane O'Donoghue
- (Ireland) Michael Watt
- (Japan) Kei Kawakami
- (Japan) Shinji Kawauchi
- (Japan) Koji Kayukawa
- (Japan) Katsuyoshi Nagasawa
- (Japan) Toshiro Tachibana
- (Japan) Manabu Yamashita
- (Japan) Heita Yoshihara
- (Malaysia) Fitri Saari
- (Netherlands) Quirijn Caspers
- (Netherlands) Jelle Galema
- (Netherlands) Robbert Kempermann
- (New Zealand) Marcus Child
- (New Zealand) Nicholas Haig
- (New Zealand) Stephen Jenness
- (New Zealand) Jacob Smith
- (Pakistan) Syed Abbas Haider Bilgrami
- (Pakistan) Muhammad Rizwan Sr.
- (Pakistan) Aamir Shahzad
- (Pakistan) Muhammad Zubair
- (South Africa) Jethro Eustice
- (South Africa) Miguel da Graca
- (South Africa) Lloyd Norris-Jones
- (South Korea) Kim Young-jin
- (South Korea) Nam Hyun-woo
- (Spain) Gabriel Dabanch
- (Spain) Xavi Lleonart
- (Spain) Andrés Mir
- (Spain) Roger Padros
- (Spain) Eduard Tubau

1 own goal

- India (against Australia)
- Ireland (against Belgium)
- Japan (against Germany)
- Netherlands (against France)
- Pakistan (against Malaysia)
- South Korea (against Germany)
- Spain (against Belgium)

2 own goals

- South Africa (against England and Japan)

Source: Rotterdam, Johor Bahru

ESP
