= Pakistan at the 2012 Summer Olympics =

- IOC code: PAK
- NOC: National Olympic Committee of Pakistan
- Website: www.nocpakistan.org

in London
- Competitors: 21 in 4 sports
- Flag bearer: Sohail Abbas
- Medals: Gold 0 Silver 0 Bronze 0 Total 0

Summer Olympics appearances (overview)
- 1948; 1952; 1956; 1960; 1964; 1968; 1972; 1976; 1980; 1984; 1988; 1992; 1996; 2000; 2004; 2008; 2012; 2016; 2020; 2024; 2028

Other related appearances
- India (1900–pres.); Bangladesh (1984–pres.)

Pakistan competed at the 2012 Summer Olympics in London, from 27 July to 12 August 2012. This was the nation's 16th appearance at the Olympics.

The Pakistan Olympic Association sent a total of 23 athletes, 21 men and two women, to compete in four different sports. Men's field hockey was the only team sport in which Pakistan had its representation in these Olympic games.

== Background ==
Pakistan made their Olympic debut at the 1948 Summer Olympics in London, England, United Kingdom and they had appeared at every Summer Olympics since except for the 1980 Summer Olympics in Moscow, Russian Soviet Federative Socialist Republic, Soviet Union. The 2012 Summer Olympics in London, England, United Kingdom marked Pakistan's 16th appearance at the Summer Olympics.

== Competitors ==
In total, 23 athletes represented Pakistan at the 2012 Summer Olympics in London, England, United Kingdom across four different sports.

Sport	Men	Women	Total
Athletics	1	1	2
Field hockey	18	0	18
Shooting	1	0	1
Swimming	1	1	2
Total	21	2	23

== Athletics ==
In total, two Pakistani athletes participated in the athletics events – Liaquat Ali in the men's 100 m and Rabia Ashiq in the women's 800 m.

Men

Athlete	Event	Heat		Quarterfinal		Semifinal		Final	
Athlete	Event	Result	Rank	Result	Rank	Result	Rank	Result	Rank
Liaquat Ali	100 m	10.90	4	Did not advance					

Women

Athlete	Event	Heat		Semifinal		Final	
Athlete	Event	Result	Rank	Result	Rank	Result	Rank
Rabia Ashiq	800 m	2:17.39	6	Did not advance			

== Field hockey ==
In total, 18 Pakistani athletes participated in the field hockey events – Sohail Abbas, Shakeel Abbasi, Fareed Ahmed, Waseem Ahmed, Muhammad Umar Bhutta, Rehan Butt, Muhammad Imran, Muhammad Irfan, Abdul Haseem Khan, Rashid Mehmood, Shafqat Rasool, Muhammad Rizwan Sr., Muhammad Rizwan Jr., Imran Shah, Muhammad Tousiq and Muhammad Waqas in the men's tournament.

Group play

Pos	Team	Pld	W	D	L	GF	GA	GD	Pts	Qualification
1	Australia	5	3	2	0	23	5	+18	11	Semi-finals
2	Great Britain (H)	5	2	3	0	14	8	+6	9	Semi-finals
3	Spain	5	2	2	1	8	10	−2	8	Fifth place game
4	Pakistan	5	2	1	2	9	16	−7	7	Seventh place game
5	Argentina	5	1	1	3	10	14	−4	4	Ninth place game
6	South Africa	5	0	1	4	11	22	−11	1	Eleventh place game

Source: FIH
(H) Hosts

30 July 2012
13:45

Spain	1–1	Pakistan
Quemada 47'	Report	Butt 46'

Umpires:
Simon Taylor (NZL)
Nigel Iggo (NZL)

1 August 2012
19:00

Pakistan	2–0	Argentina
Imran 30'; Abbas 44'	Report

Umpires:
John Wright (RSA)
Marcin Grochal (POL)

3 August 2012
16:00

Great Britain	4–1	Pakistan
Tindall 4'; Clarke 26'; Jackson 50', 67'	Report	Abbas 70'

Umpires:
Simon Taylor (NZL)
Marcelo Servetto (ESP)

5 August 2012
10:45

Pakistan	5–4	South Africa
Khan 20', 26'; Rasool 23'; Abbas 64'; Ahmed 67'	Report	McDade 2'; Reid-Ross 22', 35'; Paton 48'

Umpires:
Marcelo Servetto (ESP)
Colin Hutchinson (IRL)

7 August 2012
10:45

Australia	7–0	Pakistan
de Young 5'; Knowles 6'; Ciriello 29', 34'; Ford 42'; Dwyer 48'; Turner 70'	Report

Umpires:
Gary Simmonds (RSA)
Christian Blasch (GER)

7th/8th place game

9 August 2012
11:30

Pakistan	3–2	South Korea
Waqas 31'; Khan 44'; Imran 61'	Report	Hyun 30', 33'

Umpires:
Marcelo Servetto (ESP)
Simon Taylor (NZL)

== Shooting ==
In total, one Pakistani athlete participated in the shooting events – Khurram Inam in the |men's skeet.

Men

Athlete	Event	Qualification		Final	
Athlete	Event	Points	Rank	Points	Rank
Khurram Inam	Skeet	112	28	Did not advance	

== Swimming ==
In total, two Pakistani athletes participated in the Swimming events – Anum Bandey women's 400 m individual medley category and Israr Hussain in the men'swomen's100 m freestyle.

Men

Athlete	Event	Heat		Semifinal		Final	
Athlete	Event	Time	Rank	Time	Rank	Time	Rank
Israr Hussain	100 m freestyle	57.86	54	Did not advance			

Women

Athlete	Event	Heat		Final	
Athlete	Event	Time	Rank	Time	Rank
Anum Bandey	400 m individual medley	5:34.64	35	Did not advance	
