= 2013 Men's Hockey Asia Cup =

Field hockey competition

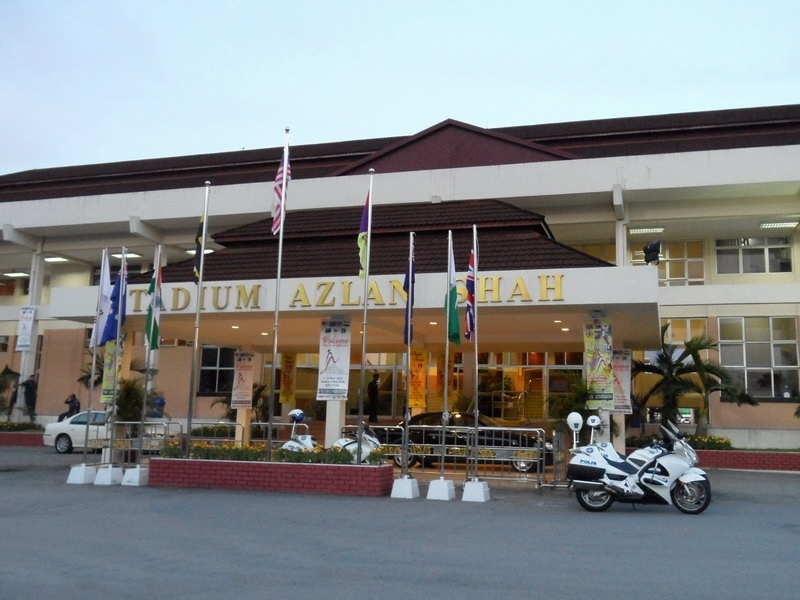
- Azlan Shah Stadium hosted the competition

Tournament details
- Host country: Malaysia
- City: Ipoh
- Dates: 24 August – 1 September
- Teams: 8 (from 1 confederation)
- Venue: Azlan Shah Stadium

Final positions
- Champions: South Korea (4th title)
- Runner-up: India
- Third place: Pakistan

Tournament statistics
- Matches played: 20
- Goals scored: 135 (6.75 per match)
- Top scorer: (South Korea) Jang Jong-Hyun (8 goals)
- Best player: (India) V. R. Raghunath

The 2013 Men's Hockey Asia Cup was the ninth edition of the Men's Hockey Asia Cup, the quadrennial international men's field hockey championship of Asia organized by the Asian Hockey Federation. It was held from 24 August to 1 September 2013 in Ipoh, Perak, Malaysia. The winner of this tournament qualified for the 2014 World Cup in The Hague, Netherlands.

The defending champions South Korea defeated India 4–3 in the final to win their fourth title. Pakistan won the bronze medal by defeating the hosts Malaysia 3–1.

== Qualified teams ==
Dates	Event	Location	Quotas	Qualifiers
9–16 May 2009	2009 Asia Cup	Kuantan, Malaysia	5	~~China~~; India; Japan; Malaysia; Pakistan; South Korea
16–24 April 2012	2012 AHF Cup	Bangkok, Thailand	3	Bangladesh; Oman; Chinese Taipei
Total			8	

== Results ==
The schedule was released on August 13, 2013.

All times are (UTC+8).

=== Pools ===
==== Pool A ====
Pos	Team	Pld	W	D	L	GF	GA	GD	Pts	Qualification
1	Pakistan	3	3	0	0	24	1	+23	9	Semi-finals
2	Malaysia (H)	3	2	0	1	15	8	+7	6	Semi-finals
3	Japan	3	1	0	2	7	12	−5	3	
4	Chinese Taipei	3	0	0	3	3	28	−25	0	

Source: FIH
(H) Hosts

24 August 2013
18:05

Pakistan	7–0	Japan
Waqas 12', 20'; Khan 22'; Tousiq 25', 35+'; Imran 33', 70+'	Report

Umpires:
Peter Wright (RSA)
Jang Jung-Min (KOR)

24 August 2013
20:05

Malaysia	10–2	Chinese Taipei
Faizal 11', 13', 69'; Firhan 18', 66'; Tajuddin 21'; Marhan 32'; Izwan 39'; Nabil 45'; Fitri 62'	Report	Liu Ching-kun 4'; Tseng Hsien-yi 46'

Umpires:
Satoshi Kondo (JPN)
Salim Lucky (BAN)

25 August 2013
18:05

Japan	5–1	Chinese Taipei
Kawakami 22'; Nagasawa 48'; Fujimoto 57'; Kawauchi 59'; Nakayama 67'	Report	Chen Yuan-fan 29'

Umpires:
Javed Shaik (IND)
Salleh al Balushi (OMA)

25 August 2013
20:05

Pakistan	4–1	Malaysia
Zubair 32'; Dilber 46'; Waqas 60'; Rasool 67'	Report	Razie 26'

Umpires:
Peter Wright (RSA)
Murray Grime (AUS)

27 August 2013
18:05

Pakistan	13–0	Chinese Taipei
Abbasi 13'; Imran 23', 52'; Rizwan 26', 38'; Rasool 39', 47'; Dilber 45'; Khan 54', 56', 69'; Tousiq 60'; Irfan 67'	Report

Umpires:
Peter Wright (RSA)
Salim Lucky (BAN)

27 August 2013
20:05

Japan	2–4	Malaysia
Tachibana 6'; Kawakami 8'	Report	Razie 14'; Firhan 28'; Faizal 60'; Azlan 66'

Umpires:
Murray Grime (AUS)
Saleh al Balushi (OMA)

==== Pool B ====
Pos	Team	Pld	W	D	L	GF	GA	GD	Pts	Qualification
1	India	3	3	0	0	19	1	+18	9	Semi-finals
2	South Korea	3	2	0	1	19	2	+17	6	Semi-finals
3	Oman	3	1	0	2	4	20	−16	3	
4	Bangladesh	3	0	0	3	3	22	−19	0	

Source: FIH

24 August 2013
16:05

India	8–0	Oman
Mandeep 4', 40', 44'; Ramandeep 17'; Raghunath 28'; Rupinder 34'; Malak 47'; Uthappa 69'	Report

Umpires:
Murray Grime (AUS)
R. Anbanathan (MAS)

25 August 2013
16:05

South Korea	9–0	Bangladesh
You 4'; Hyun 21', 35+'; Jang 31', 42', 67'; Jung 42'; Lee S. 69'; Kim Y. 70'	Report

Umpires:
Haider Rasool (PAK)
Nazmi Kamaruddin (MAS)

26 August 2013
18:05

Bangladesh	2–4	Oman
Sarkar 53'; Chayan 69'	Report	Al Shatri 29'; Al Shar 43'; Khatar 45', 59'

Umpires:
Javed Shaik (IND)
Jang Jung-Min (KOR)

26 August 2013
20:05

India	2–0	South Korea
Raghunath 6'; Mandeep 65'	Report

Umpires:
Satoshi Kondo (JPN)
Peter Wright (RSA)

28 August 2013
18:05

South Korea	10–0	Oman
Jang 15', 42', 64'; Kang M. 22', 62'; Yoon 39', 40'; Jung 50'; Lee J. 51'; 59'	Report

Umpires:
R. Anbanathan (MAS)
Haider Rasool (PAK)

28 August 2013
20:05

India	9–1	Bangladesh
Rupinder 4', 19', 27', 61'; Nikkin 25'; Raghunath 29', 52', 59'; Malak 47'	Report	Khisa 35'

Umpires:
Nazmi Kamaruddin (MAS)
Satoshi Kondo (JPN)

=== Fifth to eighth place classification ===
5–8th place semi-finals
30 August
Japan	3
Bangladesh	0
30 August
Chinese Taipei	2 (1)
Oman (s.o.)	2 (2)

Fifth place
31 August
Japan	3
Oman	1
Seventh place
31 August
Bangladesh	11
Chinese Taipei	3

==== 5–8th place semi-finals ====
30 August 2013
15:00

Japan	3–0	Bangladesh
Tachibana 9', 70+'; Kayukawa 26'	Report

Umpires:
Javed Shaik (IND)
R. Anbanathan (MAS)

30 August 2013
17:15

Oman	2–2	Chinese Taipei
24'; Al Shibli 31'		Liu Ching-kun 57'; Tseng Hsien-yi 67'
Penalties
	2–0

Umpires:
Haider Rasool (PAK)
Nazmi Kamaruddin (MAS)

==== Seventh and eighth place ====
31 August 2013
17:35

Bangladesh	11–3	Chinese Taipei
Khisa 26', 29', 68'; Chayan 32', 40', 53', 63'; Islam 35', 38'; Mahmud 61', 65'	Report	Hu Chun-che 49'; Liu Ching-kun 51'; Chen Yuan-fan 69'

Umpires:
Saleh Al Balushi (OMA)
R. Anbanathan (MAS)

==== Fifth and sixth place ====
31 August 2013
20:05

Japan	3–1	Oman
Kawakami 8', 70'; Kayukawa 61'	Report	Khatar 39'

Umpires:
Salim Lucky (BAN)
Haider Rasool (PAK)

=== First to fourth place classification ===
Semi-finals
30 August
Pakistan	1
South Korea	2
30 August
India	2
Malaysia	0

Final
1 September
South Korea	4
India	3
Third place
1 September
Pakistan	3
Malaysia	1

==== Semi-finals ====
30 August 2013
19:30

Pakistan	1–2	South Korea
Imran 46'	Report	Jang 31'; Lee N 40'

Umpires:
Murray Grime (AUS)
Satoshi Kondo (JPN)

30 August 2013
21:45

India	2–0	Malaysia
Raghunath 8'; Mandeep 60'	Report

Umpires:
Peter Wright (RSA)
Jang Jung-Min (KOR)

==== Third and fourth place ====
1 September 2013
17:35

Pakistan	3–1	Malaysia
Khan 35'; Ahmed 54'; 56'	Report	Faizal 34'

Umpires:
Peter Wright (RSA)
Javed Shaik (IND)

==== Final ====
1 September 2013
20:05

South Korea	4–3	India
Jang 28'; You 29'; Nam 57'; Kang M. 68'	Report	Rupinder 48'; Nikkin 54'; Mandeep 64'

Umpires:
Murray Grime (AUS)
Satoshi Kondo (JPN)

== Winners ==
2013 Men's Hockey Asia Cup winners

South Korea
Fourth title

== Statistics ==
=== Final standings ===
Pos	Team	Qualification
1st place, gold medalist(s)	South Korea	2014 World Cup and 2017 Asia Cup
2nd place, silver medalist(s)	India	2017 Asia Cup
3rd place, bronze medalist(s)	Pakistan	2017 Asia Cup
4	Malaysia (H)	2017 Asia Cup
5	Japan	2017 Asia Cup
6	Oman	2017 Asia Cup
7	Bangladesh	
8	Chinese Taipei	

Source: FIH
(H) Host

=== Goalscorers ===
There were 135 goals scored in 20 matches, for an average of 6.75 goals per match.

8 goals

- (South Korea) Jang Jong-hyun

6 goals

- (India) Mandeep Singh
- (India) Rupinder Pal Singh
- (India) V. R. Raghunath

5 goals

- (Bangladesh) Mamunur-Rahman Chayan
- (Malaysia) Faizal Saari
- (Pakistan) Muhammad Imran
- (Pakistan) Abdul Haseem Khan

4 goals

- (Bangladesh) Puskar Khisa
- (Japan) Kei Kawakami

3 goals

- (Chinese Taipei) Liu Chin-kun
- (Japan) Toshiro Tachibana
- (Malaysia) Firhan Ashaari
- (Oman) Rajab Basim Khatar
- (Pakistan) Shafqat Rasool
- (Pakistan) Muhammad Waqas
- (Pakistan) Muhammad Tousiq
- (South Korea) Kang Moon-kyu

2 goals

- (Bangladesh) Mainul Islam
- (Bangladesh) Rashel Mahmud
- (Chinese Taipei) Chen Yuan-fan
- (Chinese Taipei) Tseng Hsien-yi
- (India) Malak Singh
- (India) Nikkin Thimmaiah
- (Japan) Shinji Kawauchi
- (Malaysia) Razie Rahim
- (Pakistan) Muhammad Dilber
- (Pakistan) Muhammad Rizwan Jr.
- (South Korea) Hyun Hye-sung
- (South Korea) Jung Man-jae
- (South Korea) Yoon Sung-hoon
- (South Korea) You Hyo-sik

1 goal

- (Bangladesh) Roman Sarkar
- (Chinese Taipei) Hu Chun-che
- (India) S. K. Uthappa
- (India) Ramandeep Singh
- (Japan) Ippei Fujimoto
- (Japan) Koji Kayukawa
- (Japan) Katsuyoshi Nagasawa
- (Japan) Yasuhiro Nakayama
- (Malaysia) Izwan Firdaus Ahmad Tajuddin
- (Malaysia) Marhan Jalil
- (Malaysia) Azlan Misron
- (Malaysia) Nabil Fiqri
- (Malaysia) Fitri Saari
- (Malaysia) Tengku Ahmad Tajuddin
- (Oman) Hashim Al-Shatri
- (Oman) Samir Al-Shibli
- (Oman) Mohammed Bait-Jandal
- (Pakistan) Shakeel Abbasi
- (Pakistan) Waseem Ahmed
- (Pakistan) Muhammad Irfan
- (Pakistan) Muhammad Zubair
- (South Korea) Kim Young-jin
- (South Korea) Lee Jung-jun
- (South Korea) Lee Nam-yong
- (South Korea) Lee Seung-il
- (South Korea) Nam Hyun-woo

1 own goal

- Chinese Taipei (against Oman)
- Malaysia (against Pakistan)
- Oman (against South Korea)

Source: FIH

== See also ==
- 2013 Men's Asian Champions Trophy
- 2013 Women's Hockey Asia Cup
