= 2012 Sultan Azlan Shah Cup =

Field hockey tournament

Tournament details
- Host country: Malaysia
- City: Ipoh
- Teams: 7
- Venue: Azlan Shah Stadium

Final positions
- Champions: New Zealand (1st title)
- Runner-up: Argentina
- Third place: India

Tournament statistics
- Matches played: 24
- Goals scored: 98 (4.08 per match)
- Top scorer: (United Kingdom) Ashley Jackson (6 goals)
- Best player: (India) Sardar Singh

The 2012 Sultan Azlan Shah Cup is the 21st edition of the Sultan Azlan Shah Cup. It was held from 24 May to 3 June 2012 in Ipoh, Perak, Malaysia. New Zealand won their first ever title by defeating Argentina with 1–0 in the final, while five-time champions India took the bronze medal by defeating Great Britain scoring 3–1.

== Participating nations ==
Seven countries participated in this year's tournament:

- Argentina
- Great Britain
- India
- South Korea
- Malaysia
- New Zealand
- Pakistan

== Results ==
All times are Malaysia Standard Time (UTC+08:00)

=== Pool ===
Pos	Team	Pld	W	D	L	GF	GA	GD	Pts	Qualification
1	New Zealand	6	4	0	2	18	8	+10	12	Final
2	Argentina	6	4	0	2	15	16	−1	12	Final
3	Great Britain	6	3	2	1	13	11	+2	11	Third Place Match
4	India	6	3	0	3	12	15	−3	9	Third Place Match
5	South Korea	6	2	2	2	11	8	+3	8	Fifth Place Match
6	Malaysia	6	1	2	3	10	14	−4	5	Fifth Place Match
7	Pakistan	6	1	0	5	9	16	−7	3	

Source: Azlan Shah Cup
Rules for classification: 1) points; 2) goal difference; 3) goals scored; 4) head-to-head result.

24 May 2012
16:05

Pakistan	4–2	Argentina
Irfan 34'; Abbas 50'; Khan 65'; Waqas 69'	Report	Peillat 53'; Paredes 62'

Umpires:
Paco Jazquez (ESP)
David Tomlinson (NZL)

24 May 2012
18:05

New Zealand	5–1	India
S. Child 1'; Hayward 35'; Wilson 58'; Jenness 61'; L’Huillier 65'	Report	Shivendra 6'

Umpires:
Daniel Barstow (GBR)
German Montes de Oca (ARG)

24 May 2012
20:05

Malaysia	1–1	South Korea
Faizal 56'	Report	Seo 7'

Umpires:
Kamran Hussain (PAK)
Richmond Attipoe (GHA)

25 May 2012
16:05

Argentina	2–5	New Zealand
Cammareri 3'; L. Vila 53'	Report	Burrows 32'; Petherick 44'; Hayward 57'; Neal 59'; Panchia 64'

Umpires:
Richmond Attipoe (GHA)
Hong Lae-Kim (KOR)

25 May 2012
18:05

Great Britain	3–3	Malaysia
Kirkham 6'; Jackson 20'; Moore 25'	Report	Azlan 9'; Faizal 67', 68'

Umpires:
David Tomlinson (NZL)
Pankaj Tyagi (IND)

25 May 2012
20:05

South Korea	1–2	India
Nam 66'	Report	Sandeep 12'; Uthappa 68'

Umpires:
Rawi Anbananthan (MAS)
Kamran Hussain (PAK)

27 May 2012
16:05

New Zealand	3–1	Pakistan
Archibald 8'; Hayward 11'; Wilson 40'	Report	Khan 44'

Umpires:
Pankaj Tyagi (MAS)
Rawi Anbananthan (MAS)

27 May 2012
18:05

South Korea	3–4	Argentina
Nam 4'; Jang J. 42', 48'	Report	L. Vila 10'; Mazzilli 34'; Callioni 46', 70'

Umpires:
Paco Jazquez (ESP)
Daniel Barstow (GBR)

27 May 2012
20:05

India	2–3	Great Britain
Raghunath 55'; Sunil 59'	Report	Kirkham 28'; Hawes 43'; Catlin 62'

Umpires:
Hong Lae-Kim (KOR)
German Montes de Oca (ARG)

28 May 2012
16:05

Pakistan	0–4	South Korea
	Report	Nam 18', 44'; You 49'; Hyun H. 61'

Umpires:
Richmond Attipoe (GHA)
David Tomlinson (NZL)

28 May 2012
18:05

Great Britain	2–3	Argentina
Jackson 39', 65'	Report	Paredes 8', 41'; Cammareri 49'

Umpires:
Hong Lae-Kim (KOR)
Pankaj Tyagi (IND)

28 May 2012
20:05

India	3–2	Malaysia
Mujtaba 9'; Shivendra 11'; Khandekar 40'	Report	Rahim 39'; Fitri 59'

Umpires:
German Montes de Oca (ARG)
Kamran Hussain (PAK)

30 May 2012
16:05

Argentina	3–2	India
Paredes 37'; Montelli 38'; Peillat 58'	Report	Sardar 49'; Raghunath 62'

Umpires:
Paco Jazquez (ESP)
Rawi Anbananthan (MAS)

30 May 2012
18:05

Great Britain	2–1	New Zealand
Jackson 18'; Daly 27'	Report	Hayward 62'

Umpires:
Pankaj Tyagi (IND)
Hong Lae-Kim (KOR)

30 May 2012
20:05

Malaysia	3–2	Pakistan
Amir 35'; Faizal 48'; Razie 70'	Report	Bhutta 4'; Rasool 12'

Umpires:
Daniel Barstow (GBR)
David Tomlinson (NZL)

31 May 2012
16:05

South Korea	1–1	Great Britain
Yoon 23'	Report	Clarke 50'

Umpires:
German Montes de Oca (ARG)
Richmond Attipoe (GHA)

31 May 2012
18:05

India	2–1	Pakistan
Sandeep 31'; Sunil 69'	Report	Abbas 60'

Umpires:
David Tomlinson (NZL)
Rawi Anbananthan (MAS)

31 May 2012
20:05

Malaysia	1–4	New Zealand
Hafifi 45'	Report	Archibald 5'; McAleese 16'; Wilson 34'; Neal 61'

Umpires:
Kamran Hussain (PAK)
Paco Jazquez (ESP)

2 June 2012
16:05

New Zealand	0–1	South Korea
	Report	Jang J. 68'

Umpires:
Rawi Anbananthan (MAS)
Pankaj Tyagi (IND)

2 June 2012
18:05

Pakistan	1–2	Great Britain
Khan 15'	Report	Middleton 47'; Jackson 66'

Umpires:
Richmond Attipoe (GHA)
German Montes de Oca (ARG)

2 June 2012
20:05

Argentina	1–0	Malaysia
Ibarra 40'	Report

Umpires:
Hong Lae-Kim (KOR)
Paco Jazquez (ESP)

=== Classification ===
==== Fifth and sixth place ====
3 June 2012
15:35

South Korea	3–2	Malaysia
Hyun 1'; Jang J. 42'; You 50'	Report	Hafifi 17'; Faizal 63'

Umpires:
German Montes de Oca (ARG)
Kamran Hussain (PAK)

==== Third and fourth place ====
3 June 2012
18:05

Great Britain	1–3	India
Jackson 35'	Report	Shivendra 43'; Sandeep 52'; Khandekar 69'

Umpires:
Richmand Attipoe (GHA)
David Tomlinson (NZL)

==== Final ====
3 June 2012
20:35

New Zealand	1–0	Argentina
Hayward 18'	Report

Umpires:
Daniel Barstow (GBR)
Paco Jazquez (ESP)

== Awards ==
The following awards were presented at the conclusion of the tournament:

Player of the Tournament	Top Goalscorer	Goalkeeper of the Tournament	Fair Play Award	Player of the Final
(India) Sardara Singh	(United Kingdom) Ashley Jackson	(New Zealand) Kyle Pontifex	Great Britain	(New Zealand) Kyle Pontifex

== Statistics ==
=== Final standings ===
Pos	Team	Pld	W	D	L	GF	GA	GD	Pts	Qualification
1st place, gold medalist(s)	New Zealand	7	5	0	2	19	8	+11	15	Gold Medal
2nd place, silver medalist(s)	Argentina	7	4	0	3	15	17	−2	12	Silver Medal
3rd place, bronze medalist(s)	India	7	4	0	3	15	16	−1	12	Bronze Medal
4	Great Britain	7	3	2	2	14	14	0	11	
5	South Korea	7	3	2	2	14	10	+4	11	
6	Malaysia	7	1	2	4	12	17	−5	5	
7	Pakistan	6	1	0	5	9	16	−7	3	

Source: Azlan Shah Cup

=== Goalscorers ===
There were 98 goals scored in 24 matches, for an average of 4.08 goals per match.

6 goals

- (United Kingdom) Ashley Jackson

5 goals

- (Malaysia) Faizal Saari
- (New Zealand) Andrew Hayward

4 goals

- (Argentina) Matías Paredes
- (South Korea) Nam Hyun-Woo
- (South Korea) Jang Jong-Hyun

3 goals

- (India) Sandeep Singh
- (India) Shivendra Singh
- (New Zealand) Nicholas Wilson
- (Pakistan) Abdul Haseem Khan

2 goals

- (Argentina) Facundo Callioni
- (Argentina) Lucas Cammareri
- (Argentina) Gonzalo Peillat
- (Argentina) Lucas Vila
- (United Kingdom) Glenn Kirkham
- (India) Tushar Khandekar
- (India) V. R. Raghunath
- (India) S. V. Sunil
- (Malaysia) Hafifi Hanafi
- (New Zealand) Ryan Archibald
- (New Zealand) Shay Neal
- (Pakistan) Sohail Abbas
- (South Korea) Hyun Hye-Sung
- (South Korea) You Hyo-Sik

1 goal

- (Argentina) Pedro Ibarra
- (Argentina) Agustín Mazzilli
- (Argentina) Santiago Montelli
- (United Kingdom) Nicholas Catlin
- (United Kingdom) Jonathon Clarke
- (United Kingdom) Matthew Daly
- (United Kingdom) Benjamin Hawes
- (United Kingdom) Barry Middleton
- (United Kingdom) Robert Moore
- (India) Danish Mujtaba
- (India) S. K. Uthappa
- (India) Sardar Singh
- (Malaysia) Amir Fuzi
- (Malaysia) Azlan Misron
- (Malaysia) Amin Rahim
- (Malaysia) Razie Rahim
- (Malaysia) Fitri Saari
- (New Zealand) Phil Burrows
- (New Zealand) Simon Child
- (New Zealand) Stephen Jenness
- (New Zealand) Matthew L'Huillier
- (New Zealand) Shea McAleese
- (New Zealand) Arun Panchia
- (New Zealand) Richard Petherick
- (Pakistan) Muhammad Umar Bhutta
- (Pakistan) Muhammad Irfan
- (Pakistan) Shafqat Rasool
- (Pakistan) Muhammad Waqas
- (South Korea) Seo Jong-Ho
- (South Korea) Yoon Sung-Hoon
