= Imran Shah (field hockey) =

Pakistani field hockey player

Personal information
- Born: Imran Shah; 25 September 1988 (age 37) Gojra, Toba Tek Singh District, Punjab, Pakistan
Medal record
Men's field hockey
Representing Pakistan
Champions Trophy
Bronze medal – third place	2012 Melbourne	Team
Asian Champions Trophy
Gold medal – first place	2012 Doha
Gold medal – first place	2013 Kakamigahara
Silver medal – second place	2011 Ordos City

Imran Shah (born 25 September 1988) is a field hockey player from Pakistan. He plays as a goal keeper.

== Career ==
=== 2010 ===
Shah took part in the 2010 Commonwealth Games in New Delhi, India.

=== 2012 ===
Shah was part of the squad at the 2012 Olympic Games in London, UK.

== See also ==
Pakistan national field hockey team
