= Yuvraj Walmiki =

Indian field hockey player

Personal information
- Born: 29 November 1989 (age 36) Bombay, Maharashtra, India

Sport
- Sport: Field hockey
- Position: Striker / Center forward
Senior career
Years	Team	Caps	Goals
2003–2005	Bombay Republican	70	-
2005–2007	Bank of India	-	-
2007–2012	Air India	-	-
–	Delhi Waveriders	-	-
National team
Years	Team	Caps	Goals
2010–2014	India	52	(14)
Medal record
Men's field hockey
Representing India
Asian Champions Trophy
Gold medal – first place	2011 Ordos City
Hockey Champions Challenge
Silver medal – second place	2011 South Africa	Team
Sultan Azlan Shah Cup
Bronze medal – third place	2012 Malaysia	Team
- Updated on 20 January 2016

Yuvraj Walmiki (born 29 November 1989) is an Indian field hockey player from Maharashtra. He was a member of the Indian team that won the 2011 Asian Champions Trophy. He also played world cup in 2014, in the Netherlands, (The Hague). Also he is the only Indian Player to have played German Hockey League for 8 years continuously. Also he is the first hockey player to have participated in (Fear Factor) Khatron Ke Khiladi - Season 7. He received Shiv Chhatrapati Award Maharashtra highest state sporting award.

Yuvraj Walmiki made his acting debut with ALTBalaji Show "Class of 2020".

== Career ==
1) Represented India in the year 2014 Rabobank Hockey World Cup in The Hague (the Netherlands)

2) Played pre-World Cup in The Hague (the Netherlands)

3) Played the Netherlands Test series in Amsterdam in the year 2013 and won Gold Medal

4) Part of Champions Trophy in the year 2012 in Australia (Melbourne). Team entered semi finals after 30 years.

5) Bronze Medal - Sultan Azlan Shah Cup in the year 2012, Malaysia

6) Gold Medal - Olympic Qualifies in the year 2012, Delhi

7) Gold Medal - South Africa test series in Delhi in the year 2012

8) Silver Medal - Tri-Series (India, Australia and Pakistan) in Australia in the year 2011

9) Participated in Lanco super series in Australia in the year 2011

10) Silver Medal - Champions challenge in South Africa in the year 2011

11) Gold Medal - Asian Champions Trophy in China in the year 2011

12) Silver Medal - Represented India in the South Asian Games in the year 2010 in Dhaka

13) Played for the Delhi Waveriders for the last 3 years. Won a Silver Medal season 1, Gold Medal in Season 2 and Bronze in Season 3

Achievements

- First Indian Brand Ambassador for the Australian brand Ritual
- Brand Ambassador for Do Good Sports (NGO) in Mumbai
- Only Indian Player to play in German Hockey League for 4 years continuously
- Highest Goal scorer in German League for 2 years - 2010 and 2011
- Best Player in Mumbai Hockey League from the year 2004 to 2007

=== Hockey India League ===
During auction of the inaugural Hockey India League, Walmiki was bought by the Delhi franchise for US$18,500 with his base price being US$9,250. The Delhi team was named Delhi Waveriders.

Later, Yuvraj Walmiki was retained by Delhi Waveriders for the season 2016/17 at the price of US$40,000.
