= Rupinder Pal Singh =

Indian field hockey player

Personal information
- Born: 11 November 1990 (age 35) Faridkot, Punjab, India
- Height: 1.94 m (6 ft 4 in)
- Weight: 93 kg (205 lb)

Sport
- Sport: Field hockey
- Position: Defender
Senior career
Years	Team	Caps	Goals
??–present	Indian Overseas Bank	-	-
2013–2017	Delhi Waveriders	26	14
2022–present	Amsterdam	-	-
2024–2025	Rarh Bengal Tigers	11	5
2026–present	Delhi SG Pipers	-	-
National team
Years	Team	Caps	Goals
2010–2021	India	223	(125)
Medal record
Men's field hockey
Representing India
Olympic Games
Bronze medal – third place	2020 Tokyo	Team
Asian Games
Gold medal – first place	2014 Incheon	Team
Bronze medal – third place	2018 Jakarta	Team
Hockey World League
Bronze medal – third place	2014–15 Raipur	Team
Bronze medal – third place	2016–17 Bhubaneswar	Team
Asia Cup
Silver medal – second place	2013 Ipoh
Commonwealth Games
Silver medal – second place	2014 Glasgow	Team
Asian Champions Trophy
Gold medal – first place	2011 Ordos City
Gold medal – first place	2016 Kuantan
Silver medal – second place	2012 Doha

Rupinder Pal Singh (born 11 November 1990) is an Indian former field hockey player, who represented the India national field hockey team. He plays as a fullback and is known for his abilities as one of the best drag flickers in the world. He represented India in the 2014 Commonwealth Games at Glasgow, 2014 Asian Games at Incheon, 2016 Olympic Games held at Rio de Janeiro, and at the 2018 Commonwealth Games, held at Gold Coast, Australia. He was part of the Indian hockey team that won a bronze medal at the 2020 Olympic Games in Tokyo and announced his retirement from international Hockey after 2020 Olympics.

== Early life ==
Rupinder Pal Singh was born in a Sikh family in Faridkot, Punjab, India. The six-foot four inch-footer, is the youngest of the family, who took up hockey at the age of eleven. He is related to international hockey player, Gagan Ajit Singh. His interest in hockey got a boost when got selected for the Chandigarh Hockey Academy.

== Career ==
Singh's international debut was in May 2010 in Sultan Azlan Shah Cup in Ipoh. His side went on to win the 2010 Sultan Azlan Shah Cup. The following year, Rupinder scored his first international Hat-trick against Great Britain in the 2011 Sultan Azlan Shah Cup. In the same tournament, Singh won the Top-scorer Award and was named in the Sultan Azlan Shah XI Team. At the 2014 Men's Hockey World Cup, Rupinder was named as the team's Vice-captain. He came out of retirement in May 2022 and was supposed to lead Indian team in Asia cup starting on May 23 in Jakarta, Indonesia but will not as he is ruled out of the tournament due to a wrist injury. Birendra Lakra, earlier named as vice-captain, will now lead men in blue alongside SV Sunil as new vice-captain of the team.

== Hockey India League ==
Rupinder was bought by the Delhi franchise for a hefty sum. The Delhi team was named Delhi Waveriders. During an interview, Rupinder was quoted saying "I was surprised when the Delhi side picked me up for such a huge amount, but the tournament gave me a good platform to hone my skills, spending time with players like Sardar Singh and Nicolas Jacobi made me improve my game a lot and it showed in my performance, Even though we lost to Ranchi in the final, the team had a good run in the tournament". He proved his worth, scoring seven goals for the team, which finished second in the league. In the 2nd season, Rupinder's side won the 2014 Hockey India League, with Singh scoring 7 goals. Rupinder was declared the Player of the Tournament at the 2016 Hockey India League, and due to his significant contributions, Delhi Waveriders went on to secure the 3rd position at the HIL that year. In 2017, he captained the Delhi Waveriders, taking the team to the semi-final stage. Rupinder has been regularly playing for Indian Overseas Bank (Chennai based Indian Bank) for many years.

== Career achievements ==
- 2010 Sultan Azlan Shah Cup, India won the Gold
- 2011 Sultan Azlan Shah Cup, won Top-scorer Award, named in Sultan Azlan Shah's XI
- 2011 Asian Men's Hockey Champions Trophy, India won the Gold
- 2011 Men's Hockey Champions Challenge I, India won the Silver
- 2012 Sultan Azlan Shah Cup, India won the Bronze
- 2012 Men's Hockey Champions Trophy, India stood 4th
- 2012 Asian Men's Hockey Champions Trophy, India won the Silver
- 2012–13 Men's FIH Hockey World League Round 2, scored 7 goals
- 2013 Sultan Azlan Shah Cup, won Top-scorer Award
- 2013 Men's Hockey Asia Cup, India won Silver, scored 6 goals
- 2014 Men's Hockey World Cup
- 2014 Commonwealth Games, India won the Silver
- 2014 Asian Games, held in Incheon, India won Gold
- 2014 Men's Hockey Champions Trophy, India stood 4th
- 2014-15 Men's FIH Hockey World League, India won the Bronze
- 2016 Asian Men's Hockey Champions Trophy, India won the Gold
- 2016 Olympic Games held at Rio de Janeiro
- 2016 Asian Champions Trophy, India won the Gold, and he won the "Top Goal Scorer of the Tournament" (11 goals) and the "Best Player of the Tournament" award
- 4-Nations Invitational Tournament, held in Melbourne, he won the "Top Goal Scorer of the Tournament" award (6 goals)
- 2017 Sultan Azlan Shah Cup, India won the Bronze
- 2017 Hockey World League Finals held in Bhubaneshwar, India won the Bronze, and he won the "Fan's Choice Award"
- 2018 4-Nations Invitational Tournament, held in Tauranga and Hamilton, in New Zealand
- 2018 Commonwealth Games, held at Gold Coast, Australia
- 2018 Asian Games, held in Jakarta, India won the Bronze
- 2020 Tokyo Olympics, held in Tokyo, India won the Bronze
