= Manabu Yamashita =

Japanese field hockey player

Personal information
- Born: 4 February 1989 (age 37) Oyabe, Japan
- Height: 1.73 m (5 ft 8 in)

Sport
- Sport: Field hockey
- Position: Defender
- Club: Oyabe Redox
National team
Years	Team	Caps	Goals
–	Japan	199	(1)
Medal record
Men's field hockey
Representing Japan
Asian Games
Gold medal – first place	2018 Jakarta	Team
Silver medal – second place	2022 Hangzhou	Team
Asian Champions Trophy
Silver medal – second place	2013 Kakamigahara
Silver medal – second place	2021 Dhaka
Bronze medal – third place	2023 Chennai
- Updated on 24 December 2021

Manabu Yamashita (山下 学, Yamashita Manabu, born 4 February 1989) is a Japanese field hockey player. He represented the national team at the 2020 Summer Olympics.

He was a part of the Japan squad which won their first Asian Games gold medal in hockey in 2018.
