= Muhammad Umar Bhutta =

Pakistani field hockey player

Muhammad Umar Bhutta محمد عمر بھُٹہ
Personal information
- Born: Muhammad Umar Bhutta; 24 December 1992 (age 33) Bahawalpur, Punjab, Pakistan

Sport
- Sport: Field hockey
National team
Years	Team	Caps	Goals
2012	Pakistan U21	85	-
2010-present	Pakistan	200	(30)
Medal record
Men's field hockey
Representing Pakistan
Asian Games
Silver medal – second place	2014 Incheon	Team
Asia Cup
Bronze medal – third place	2013 Ipoh	Team
Bronze medal – third place	2017 Dhaka	Team
Champions Trophy
Silver medal – second place	2014 Bhubaneswar	Team
Bronze medal – third place	2012 Melbourne	Team
Asian Champions Trophy
Gold medal – first place	2013 Kakamigahara
Gold medal – first place	2018 Muscat
Silver medal – second place	2011 Ordos City
Silver medal – second place	2016 Kuantan
South Asian Games
Gold medal – first place	2016 Guwahati	Team
Sultan Azlan Shah Cup
Silver medal – second place	2011 Sultan Azlan Shah Cup
Bronze medal – third place	2022 Sultan Azlan Shah Cup
- Updated on 12 May 2023

Muhammad Umar Bhutta (Urdu: محمد عمر بھُٹہ; born 24 December 1992 in Bahawalpur, Punjab, Pakistan) is a Pakistani field hockey player.

== Career ==
=== Domestic leagues ===
In the Malaysia Hockey League, Bhutta played five seasons with the Kuala Lumpur Hockey Club.

=== International ===
Bhutta was included in the Pakistan hockey team squad for the 2012 Olympic Games in London, UK.

In 2012, he was named captain of the Pakistan junior hockey team for the 7th Junior Asia Cup played at Malacca, Malaysia.

In September 2013, Bhutta was named captain of the Pakistan junior team that competed in the Sultan of Johor Cup in Johor Bahru, Malaysia.

In 2013, Bhutta was retained as captain of the national junior team that represented Pakistan in the Junior Hockey World Cup in New Delhi, India.

In 2018, Bhutta was named in the 18-member Pakistan hockey team for the Hockey World Cup in Bhubaneswar, India.

In December 2021, Bhutta led the Pakistan team in the Asian Champions Trophy in Dhaka.

In May 2022, Bhutta led the 20-member Pakistan squad at the Hockey Asia Cup held in Jakarta.

Later in 2022, he captained the Pakistan hockey team during the Commonwealth Games in Birmingham.

In August 2023, he was the captain of the Pakistan team during the Asian Champions Trophy held in Chennai.

Later in 2023, Bhutta captained the Pakistan team at the 19th Asian Games in Hangzhou, China.
