= Ben Arnold (field hockey) =

British field hockey player

Personal information
- Born: 3 May 1990 (age 36) England
- Height: 167 cm (5 ft 6 in)
- Weight: 69 kg (152 lb)

Sport
- Sport: Field hockey
- Position: Midfield
Senior career
Years	Team	Caps	Goals
2009–2015	Beeston	-	-
2015–2016	HGC	-	-
2016–2022	Wimbledon	-	-
National team
Years	Team	Caps	Goals
–	England	28	(3)
2012 - 2015	Great Britain	3	(0)

Ben Arnold (born 3 May 1990) is an English former field hockey player.

== Biography ==
Arnold studied Corporate Strategy and Governance at the University of Nottingham from 2008 to 2012.

He played club hockey for Beeston in the Men's England Hockey League from 2006 and while at Beeston, he represented England at the 2012 Men's Hockey Champions Trophy in Melbourne, Australia, beating reigning Olympic champions Germany in the group stages, and during the 2013/14 FIH World League in India, and played in the EuroHockey Championships in Belgium.

After spending one year playing in the Dutch Hoofdklasse League for HGC he returned to England and joined Wimbledon Hockey Club, where he spent six years as captain.

He announced his retirement from hockey in 2022 to concentrate on his career as an investment director with Schroders, who he had joined in 2016.
