= Lee Sung-il =

South Korean academic (born 1943)

Sung-Il Lee (Korean: 이성일; born 1943) is a South Korean professor, author, and translator. He is currently a professor emeritus at Yonsei University.

== Biography ==
He was born in Seoul in 1943. Sung-Il Lee grew up in South Korea and studied English at Yonsei University. He received his MA from UC Davis in 1973 and PhD from Texas Tech University in 1980. In 1981, he started his lectures at Yonsei University and taught Shakespeare, English Renaissance drama and medieval English literature. He retired from the faculty in 2009. As a professor emeritus at Yonsei University, he continues his works of translation.

== Work ==
During his career as a professor, Sung-Il Lee expressed his interest in Korean literature translation and criticized the translations mostly done by native English speakers. He translated Korean literature into English, which includes his work of translating Hansi (漢詩, Korean poems in classical Chinese). His translations were published in a volume titled The Moonlit Pond. The book was critically acclaimed by American publishers such as Choice Reviews which included Lee's work in Outstanding Academic Books in 1998. This book also received the 4th Award for Korean Literature Translation given by Korean Culture and Arts Foundation (currently Literature Translation Institute of Korea) in 1999.

After the retirement in 2009, he continued his works of Korean literature translation. In 2011, he translated the works of Korean poet Yoo Chi-jin with the support of The Daesan Foundation and published them in a volume titled Blue Stallion. In 2014, he translated the works of Korean poet Yi Yuksa and published them in The Vertex, which also includes several translations by Lee's father In-Su Lee, a former professor at Korea University. In 2016, his Shin Seok Jeong translation was selected as a beneficiary of The Daesan Foundation, and was later published under the title Do You Know That Faraway Land?. In 2019, he published his translated works of Jo Ji-hun in a volume titled Shedding of the Petals and held a publication ceremony in New York.

Aside from his Korean literature translation, he also translates English medieval and Renaissance literature. He has translated the works of Shakespeare and Thomas Kyd's The Spanish Tragedy into Korean. Moreover, he worked on and was critically acclaimed for his translation of Beowulf into modern English, which is notable as a non-native English speaker's project.

== Publications ==
- The Moonlit Pond: Korean Classical Poems in Chinese. Copper Canyon Press, 1997.
- The Brush and The Sword: Kasa, Korean Classical Poems in Prose. Cross-Cultural Communications, 2009.
- Blue Stallion: Poems of Yu Chi-whan. Homa & Sekey Books, 2011.
- The Crane in the Clouds: Shijo: Korean Classical Poems in the Vernacular. Homa & Sekey Books, 2013.
- Nostalgia: Poems of Chung Ji-yong. Cross-Cultural Communications, 2017.
- Beowulf in Parallel Texts: Translated with Textual and Explanatory Notes. Cascade Books, 2018.
- Shedding of the Petals: Poems of Cho Jihoon A Dual Language Edition with Parallel Texts in Korean and English (English and Korean Edition). Cross-Cultural Communications, 2019.
- Do You Know That Faraway Land?, Cross-Cultural Communications, 2020.
- 고대영시선: 베오울프 외. 한국문화사, 2017.
- 서반아비극. 소명출판, 2020.

== See also ==
- Classical Chinese poetry
- Jo Jihun
