= 2013 Men's Asian Champions Trophy =

Third edition of the Men's Asian Champions trophy

Tournament details
- Host country: Japan
- City: Kakamigahara
- Dates: 2–10 November
- Teams: 6 (from 1 confederation)
- Venue: Gifu Hockey Stadium

Final positions
- Champions: Pakistan (2nd title)
- Runner-up: Japan
- Third place: Malaysia

Tournament statistics
- Matches played: 18
- Goals scored: 88 (4.89 per match)
- Top scorer: (Malaysia) Faizal Saari (9 goals)

The 2013 Men's Asian Champions Trophy was the third edition of the Men's Asian Champions Trophy. The tournament was held alongside the women's tournament in Kakamigara, Japan from 2 to 10 November 2013.

Six Asian teams (Pakistan, China, India, Japan, Oman and Malaysia) participated in the tournament which involved round-robin league among all teams followed by play-offs for final positions.

The defending champions Pakistan won the tournament for the second time by defeating the hosts Japan 3–1 in the final.

== Teams ==
Below is the list of the participating teams for the tournament

Team	Appearance	Last appearance	Previous best performance
China	3rd	2012	4th (2012)
India	3rd	2012	1st (2011)
Japan	3rd	2012	4th (2011)
Malaysia	3rd	2012	3rd (2011, 2012)
Oman	2nd	2012	5th (2012)
Pakistan	3rd	2012	1st (2012)

== Fixtures ==
All times are Japan Standard Time (UTC+9)

=== Round robin ===
Pos	Team	Pld	W	D	L	GF	GA	GD	Pts	Qualification
1	Pakistan	5	4	1	0	19	5	+14	13	Final
2	Japan (H)	5	3	1	1	10	2	+8	10	Final
3	China	5	3	0	2	16	11	+5	9	Third place game
4	Malaysia	5	2	0	3	13	13	0	6	Third place game
5	India	5	2	0	3	12	12	0	6	Fifth place game
6	Oman	5	0	0	5	3	26	−23	0	Fifth place game

Source: FIH
(H) Hosts

2 November 2013
14:30

Malaysia	0–1	Japan
	Report	Yamabe 70'

Umpires:
Jang Jung-min (KOR)
Thani Saheem (OMA)

2 November 2013
16:30

Pakistan	8–0	Oman
Hussain 16', 52'; Imran 31', 41', 64'; Dilber 34', 53'; Tousiq 46'	Report

Umpires:
Lingam Karupusamy (MAS)
Shin Dong-yun (KOR)

2 November 2013
18:30

India	0–2	China
	Report	Yu Xin 50'; E Liguang 55'

Umpires:
Kamran Hussain (PAK)
Yuji Hosokawa (JPN)

3 November 2013
14:30

Oman	3–5	Malaysia
Al-Shaaibi 12'; Al-Shar 24'; Awadh 48'	Report	Marhan 2'; Faizal 29', 35', 62', 70'

Umpires:
Li Songxin (CHN)
Kamran Hussain (PAK)

3 November 2013
16:30

Pakistan	5–1	China
Imran 21', 34'; Khan 31'; Rizwan Sr. 40'; Dilber 42'	Report	Zhang Zhixuan 18'

Umpires:
Ripudaman Sharma (IND)
Thani Saheem (OMA)

3 November 2013
18:30

India	1–2	Japan
Gurjinder 12'	Report	Yoshihara 23', 54'

Umpires:
Jang Jung-min (KOR)
Lingam Karupusamy (MAS)

5 November 2013
16:30

Oman	0–3	India
	Report	Akashdeep 19'; Talwinder 30'; Amit 62'

Umpires:
Shin Dong-yun (KOR)
Yuji Hosokawa (JPN)

5 November 2013
16:30

Malaysia	0–1	Pakistan
	Report	Rasool 70'

Umpires:
Jang Jung-min (KOR)
Li Songxin (CHN)

5 November 2013
18:30

Japan	1–3	China
K. Kawakami 68'	Report	Sun Long 15', 50'; E Liguang 45'

Umpires:
Ripudaman Sharma (IND)
Kamran Hussain (PAK)

7 November 2013
10:30

China	4–5	Malaysia
Du Talake 6'; Li Zecheng 23', 43'; Wang Zipeng 64'	Report	Faizal 4'; Razie 11', 47'; Ismail 26'; Amirullah 48'

Umpires:
Ripudaman Sharma (IND)
Thani Saheem (OMA)

7 November 2013
12:30

India	4–5	Pakistan
Gurjinder 24'; Amit 30'; Manpreet 40'; Malak 49'	Report	Khan 2'; Imran 35'; Rizwan Sr. 36', 44'; Rizwan Jr. 53'

Umpires:
Jang Jung-min (KOR)
Yuji Hosokawa (JPN)

7 November 2013
14:30

Japan	4–0	Oman
Tachibana 8', 43', 58'; Hatakeyama 55'	Report

Umpires:
Lingam Karupusamy (MAS)
Li Songxin (CHN)

8 November 2013
14:30

Malaysia	3–4	India
Azreen 10'; Faizal 12', 67'	Report	Ramandeep 4'; Malak 41', 51'; Mandeep 54'

Umpires:
Kamran Hussain (PAK)
Shin Dong-yun (KOR)

8 November 2013
16:30

China	6–0	Oman
Li Zecheng 13'; Du Talake 17', 58'; Guo Xiaoping 19'; Zhang Zhixuan 52', 67'	Report

Umpires:
Yuji Hosokawa (JPN)
Ripudaman Sharma (IND)

8 November 2013
18:30

Pakistan	2–2	Japan
Khan 34'; Rizwan Jr. 40'	Report	Kayukawa 23'; Yamabe 42'

Umpires:
Lingam Karupusamy (MAS)
Li Songxin (CHN)

=== Classification round ===
==== Fifth place game ====
10 November 2013
10:00

India	6–1	Oman
Kothajit 6'; Gurjinder 11'; Akashdeep 24', 40', 68'; Malak 66'	Report	Al-Shar 58'

Umpires:
Kamran Hussain (PAK)
Shin Dong-yun (KOR)

==== Third place game ====
10 November 2013
12:30

China	0–3	Malaysia
	Report	Faizal 2', 51'; Adabi 46'

Umpires:
Yuji Hosokawa (JPN)
Ripudaman Sharma (IND)

==== Final ====
10 November 2013
15:00

Pakistan	3–1	Japan
Rizwan Sr. 40'; Khan 61'; A. Butt 65'	Report	K. Kawakami 11'

Umpires:
Lingam Karupusamy (MAS)
Jang Jong-min (KOR)

== Statistics ==
=== Final standings ===
1. Pakistan
2. Japan
3. Malaysia
4. China
5. India
6. Oman

=== Goalscorers ===
There were 89 goals scored in 18 matches, for an average of 4.94 goals per match.

9 goals

- (Malaysia) Faizal Saari

6 goals

- (Pakistan) Muhammad Imran

4 goals

- (India) Akashdeep Singh
- (India) Malak Singh
- (Pakistan) Abdul Haseem Khan
- (Pakistan) Muhammad Rizwan Sr.

3 goals

- (China) Du Talake
- (China) Li Zecheng
- (China) Zhang Zhixuan
- (India) Gurjinder Singh
- (Japan) Toshiro Tachibana
- (Pakistan) Muhammad Dilber

2 goals

- (China) E Liguang
- (China) Sun Long
- (India) Amit Rohidas
- (Japan) Kei Kawakami
- (Japan) Koshi Yamabe
- (Japan) Heita Yoshihara
- (Malaysia) Razie Rahim
- (Oman) Mohamed Hubais Al-Shar
- (Pakistan) Salman Hussain
- (Pakistan) Muhammad Rizwan Jr.

1 goal

- (China) Guo Xiaoping
- (China) Wang Zipeng
- (China) Yu Xin
- (Japan) Manabu Hatakeyama
- (Japan) Koji Kayukawa
- (India) Kothajit Khadangbam
- (India) Mandeep Singh
- (India) Manpreet Singh
- (India) Ramandeep Singh
- (India) Talwinder Singh
- (Malaysia) Ismail Abu
- (Malaysia) Adabi Azammi
- (Malaysia) Marhan Jalil
- (Malaysia) Azreen Nasir
- (Malaysia) Amirullah Zainol
- (Oman) Khalid Al-Shaaibi
- (Oman) Mohammed Abdullah Bait Awadh
- (Pakistan) Ammad Butt
- (Pakistan) Shafqat Rasool
- (Pakistan) Muhammad Tousiq

Source: FIH

== See also ==
- 2013 Men's Hockey Asia Cup
- 2013 Women's Asian Champions Trophy
