= 2011 Men's Asian Champions Trophy =

First edition of the Men's Asian Champions trophy

Tournament details
- Host country: China
- City: Ordos
- Dates: 3–11 September
- Teams: 6 (from 1 confederation)
- Venue: Ordos Hockey Stadium

Final positions
- Champions: India (1st title)
- Runner-up: Pakistan
- Third place: Malaysia

Tournament statistics
- Matches played: 18
- Goals scored: 75 (4.17 per match)
- Top scorer(s): (Japan) Kenta Tanaka (Malaysia) Amin Rahim (South Korea) Jang Jong-hyun (4 goals)

The 2011 Men's Asian Champions Trophy was the first edition of the Men's Asian Champions Trophy and it took place from 3 to 11 September 2011 in Ordos, China.

The top six teams (India, South Korea, Pakistan, China, Malaysia and Japan) from the 2010 Asian Games participated in the tournament which involved round-robin league among all teams followed by play-offs for final positions. The tournament was combined with the 2nd Women's Asian Champions Trophy.

The tie-breaker in a knockout match was a one-on-one between the striker and the goalkeeper. The striker had to start from the 23-meter line and was given only eight seconds to score. This way of tie-breaker was used as part of a testing phase by FIH.

India became the first champion of the tournament after defeating Pakistan in the final 4-2 in a penalty shootout after regulation and extra time ended scoreless.

== Teams ==
- China
- India
- Japan
- Malaysia
- Pakistan
- South Korea

== Results ==
=== Preliminary round ===
Pos	Team	Pld	W	D	L	GF	GA	GD	Pts	Qualification
1	Pakistan	5	3	1	1	13	10	+3	10	Final
2	India	5	2	3	0	15	8	+7	9	Final
3	Japan	5	2	1	2	11	9	+2	7	Third place game
4	Malaysia	5	2	1	2	14	13	+1	7	Third place game
5	South Korea	5	2	1	2	13	14	−1	7	Fifth place game
6	China (H)	5	0	1	4	5	17	−12	1	Fifth place game

Source: FIH
(H) Hosts

3 September 2011
13:00

South Korea	3–2	Japan
Jang Jong-hyun 6', 18'; Kang Moon-kweon 58'	Report	Tanaka 8'; K. Kawakami 68'

Umpires:
You Suolong (CHN)
Javed Shaikh (IND)

September 2011
15:00

India	5–0	China
Gurwinder 5'; Yuvraj 21'; Rupinder 40'; Rajpal 44'; Raghunath 64'	Report

Umpires:
Haider Rasool (PAK)
Eric Koh (MAS)

3 September 2011
19:00

Pakistan	3–2	Malaysia
Khan 22'; Imran 32'; Abbasi 63'	Report	Amin 4'; Ahmad 34'

Umpires:
Simon Taylor (NZL)
Kim Jong-won (KOR)

4 September 2011
15:00

Japan	1–1	India
Shiokawa 69'	Report	Gurwinder 22'

Umpires:
Simon Taylor (NZL)
Eric Koh (MAS)

4 September 2011
17:00

South Korea	4–3	Malaysia
Jang Jong-hyun 12'; Kang Moon-kweon 38'; Kim Ju-hun 59'; Cho Suk-hoon 63'	Report	Izwan Firdaus 16', 67'; Amin 35'

Umpires:
You Suolong (CHN)
Javed Shaikh (IND)

4 September 2011
19:00

Pakistan	4–1	China
Abbasi 34', 68'; Bhutta 46'; Rasool 49'	Report	Liu Xiantang 35'

Umpires:
Yuji Hosokawa (JON)
Saleem Aaron (USA)

6 September 2011
11:00

China	2–4	Malaysia
Liu Yixian 29', 35+'	Report	Tengku 7'; Amin 23'; Izwan Firdaus 53'; Faizal 60'

Umpires:
Saleem Aaron (USA)
Haider Rasool (PAK)

6 September 2011
13:00

Japan	3–1	Pakistan
Kayukawa 35+'; Tanaka 62', 64'	Report	Rizwan Jr. 5'

Umpires:
You Suolong (CHN)
Kim Jong-won (KOR)

6 September 2011
15:00

India	5–3	South Korea
Rupinder 3'; Gurwinder 4'; Sunil 7'; Rajpal 25'; Yuvraj 61'	Report	Lee Nam-yong 8', 26'; Nam Hyun-woo 70'

Umpires:
Yuji Hosokawa (JPN)
Simon Taylor (NZL)

7 September 2011
13:00

Malaysia	2–2	India
Tengku 25'; Amin 32'	Report	Ravipal 9'; Danish 53'

Umpires:
Yuji Hosokawa (JPN)
Haider Rasool (PAK)

7 September 2011
15:00

China	1–3	Japan
Song Yi 27'	Report	Ozawa 35'; Nagasawa 45'; Tanaka 53'

Umpires:
Javed Shaikh (IND)
Saleem Aaron (USA)

7 September 2011
19:00

Pakistan	3–2	South Korea
Waqas 7'; Irfan 13'; Rasool 57'	Report	Cho Suk-hoon 43'; Nam Hyun-woo 53'

Umpires:
Eric Koh (MAS)
Simon Taylor (NZL)

9 September 2011
13:00

India	2–2	Pakistan
Rupinder 46'; Danish 53'	Report	Waqas 40'; Irfan 43'

Umpires:
You Suolong (CHN)
Simon Taylor (NZL)

9 September 2011
15:00

South Korea	1–1	China
Nam Hyun-woo 5'	Report	Na Yubo 65'

Umpires:
Eric Koh (MAS)
Haider Rasool (PAK)

9 September 2011
19:00

Malaysia	3–2	Japan
Ahmad 46', 55'; Faizal 66'	Report	Kayukawa 23'; Kawauchi 35'

Umpires:
Kim Jong-won (KOR)
Javed Shaikh (IND)

=== Classification round ===
==== Fifth place game ====
11 September 2011
13:00

South Korea	2–1	China
Jang Jong-hyun 10'; Kim Ju-hun 28'	Report	Liu Yixian 62'

Umpires:
Yuji Hosokawa (JPN)
Saleem Aaron (USA)

==== Third place game ====
11 September 2011
15:30

Japan	0–1	Malaysia
	Report	Firhan 70'

Umpires:
You Suolong (CHN)
Javed Shaikh (IND)

==== Final ====
11 September 2011
18:00

Pakistan	0–0 (a.e.t.)	India
	Report
Penalties
Khan (penalty shoot-out missed); Rizwan Jr. (penalty shoot-out scored); Rasool (penalty shoot-out missed); Wasim (penalty shoot-out scored)	2–4	(penalty shoot-out missed) Gurwinder; (penalty shoot-out scored) Danish; (penalty shoot-out scored) Rajpal; (penalty shoot-out scored) Yuvraj; (penalty shoot-out scored) Sarvanjit

== Statistics ==
=== Final standings ===
1. India
2. Pakistan
3. Malaysia
4. Japan
5. South Korea
6. China

=== Goalscorers ===
There were 75 goals scored in 18 matches, for an average of 4.17 goals per match.

4 goals

- (Japan) Kenta Tanaka
- (Malaysia) Amin Rahim
- (South Korea) Jang Jong-hyun

3 goals

- (China) Liu Yixian
- (India) Gurwinder Singh Chandi
- (India) Rupinder Pal Singh
- (Malaysia) Ahmad Amir
- (Malaysia) Izwan Firdaus Ahmad Tajuddin
- (Pakistan) Shakeel Abbasi
- (South Korea) Nam Hyun-woo

2 goals

- (India) Danish Mujtaba
- (India) Rajpal Singh
- (India) Yuvraj Walmiki
- (Japan) Koji Kayukawa
- (Malaysia) Faizal Saari
- (Malaysia) Tengku Ahmad Tajuddin
- (Pakistan) Muhammad Irfan
- (Pakistan) Shafqat Rasool
- (Pakistan) Muhammad Waqas
- (South Korea) Cho Suk-hoon
- (South Korea) Kang Moon-kweon
- (South Korea) Kim Ju-hun
- (South Korea) Lee Nam-yong

1 goal

- (China) Liu Xiantang
- (China) Na Yubo
- (China) Song Yi
- (India) Ravipal Singh
- (India) S. V. Sunil
- (India) V. R. Raghunath
- (Japan) Kei Kawakami
- (Japan) Shinji Kawauchi
- (Japan) Katsuyoshi Nagasawa
- (Japan) Kazuyuki Ozawa
- (Japan) Naoto Shiokawa
- (Malaysia) Firhan Ashari
- (Pakistan) Umar Bhutta
- (Pakistan) Muhammad Imran
- (Pakistan) Abdul Haseem Khan
- (Pakistan) Muhammad Rizwan Jr.

Source: FIH

== See also ==
- 2011 Women's Asian Champions Trophy
- 2011 Men's Hockey Champions Trophy
