= Muhammad Rizwan Jr. =

Pakistani field hockey player

Muhammad Rizwan
Personal information
- Full name: Muhammad Rizwan Jr.
- Born: 25 November 1991 (age 34)

Sport
- Sport: Field hockey
- Position: Midfielder
National team
Years	Team	Caps	Goals
–	Pakistan	141	(10)
Medal record
Men's field hockey
Representing Pakistan
Asian Games
Silver medal – second place	2014 Incheon	Team
Asia Cup
Bronze medal – third place	2013 Ipoh
Bronze medal – third place	2017 Dhaka
Champions Trophy
Silver medal – second place	2014 Bhubaneswar
Bronze medal – third place	2012 Melbourne
Asian Champions Trophy
Gold medal – first place	2013 Kakamigahara
Gold medal – first place	2018 Muscat
Silver medal – second place	2011 Ordos
Silver medal – second place	2016 Kuantan

Muhammad Rizwan Jr. (born 25 November 1991) is a Pakistani field hockey player who plays as a midfielder for the Pakistan national team.

He was included in the squad for the 2012 Olympic Games in London, UK.

Rizwan now plays his club hockey for Khalsa Leamington in the Men's England Hockey League.

== See also ==
- Muhammad Rizwan Sr. (born 1989)
