= Malak Singh =

Indian field hockey player (born 1992)

Personal information
- Born: 30 December 1992 (age 33) Sant Nagar, Sirsa district, Haryana, India

Sport
- Sport: Field hockey
- Position: Forward
National team
Years	Team	Caps	Goals
2013–2014	India		-
Medal record
Men's field hockey
Representing India
Asia Cup
Silver medal – second place	2013 Ipoh	Team

Malak Singh (born 30 December 1992) is an Indian field hockey player who plays as a forward. He hails from Sant Nagar in Sirsa district, Haryana, where he plays for the Namdhari XI hockey team. He was part of the Indian team that won the silver medal at the 2013 Men's Hockey Asia Cup in Malaysia.

Singh works with the western zone of Indian Railways and plays for the Railways hockey team in national championships. He also plays for Kalinga Lancers in the Hockey India League (HIL), having been signed up by the franchise in 2015 for US$24,000. He previously played for the Punjab Warriors in HIL with a US$9,000 contract signed in December 2012.
