= Hyun Hye-sung =

South Korean field hockey player

Personal information
- Native name: Hyeon Hye-seong
- Born: 7 October 1986 (age 39)

Sport
- Country: South Korea
- Sport: Men's field hockey
Medal record
Men's field hockey
Representing South Korea
Asian Games
Bronze medal – third place	2014 Incheon	Team
Asia Cup
Gold medal – first place	2013 Ipoh

- Hyun Hye-sung
- Hangul: 현혜성
- RR: Hyeon Hyeseong
- MR: Hyŏn Hyesŏng

Hyun Hye-sung (born 7 October 1986), also spelled Hyeon Hye-seong, is a South Korean men's field hockey player who competed in the 2008 Summer Olympics and the 2012 Summer Olympics.
