= Kang Moon-kweon =

South Korean field hockey player

- Hangul: 강문권
- RR: Gang Mungwon
- MR: Kang Mun'gwŏn

Kang Moon-kweon
Medal record

Men's field hockey

Representing South Korea

Asian Games
Bronze medal – third place	2014 Incheon	Team

Asia Cup
Gold medal – first place	2013 Ipoh	
Silver medal – second place	2007 Chennai	

Kang Moon-kweon (born 24 April 1988, Seoul) is a South Korean field hockey player who competed in the 2008 and 2012 Summer Olympics. His twin brother, Kang Moon-kyu, is also an Olympic field hockey player.
