= S. V. Sunil =

Indian field hockey player

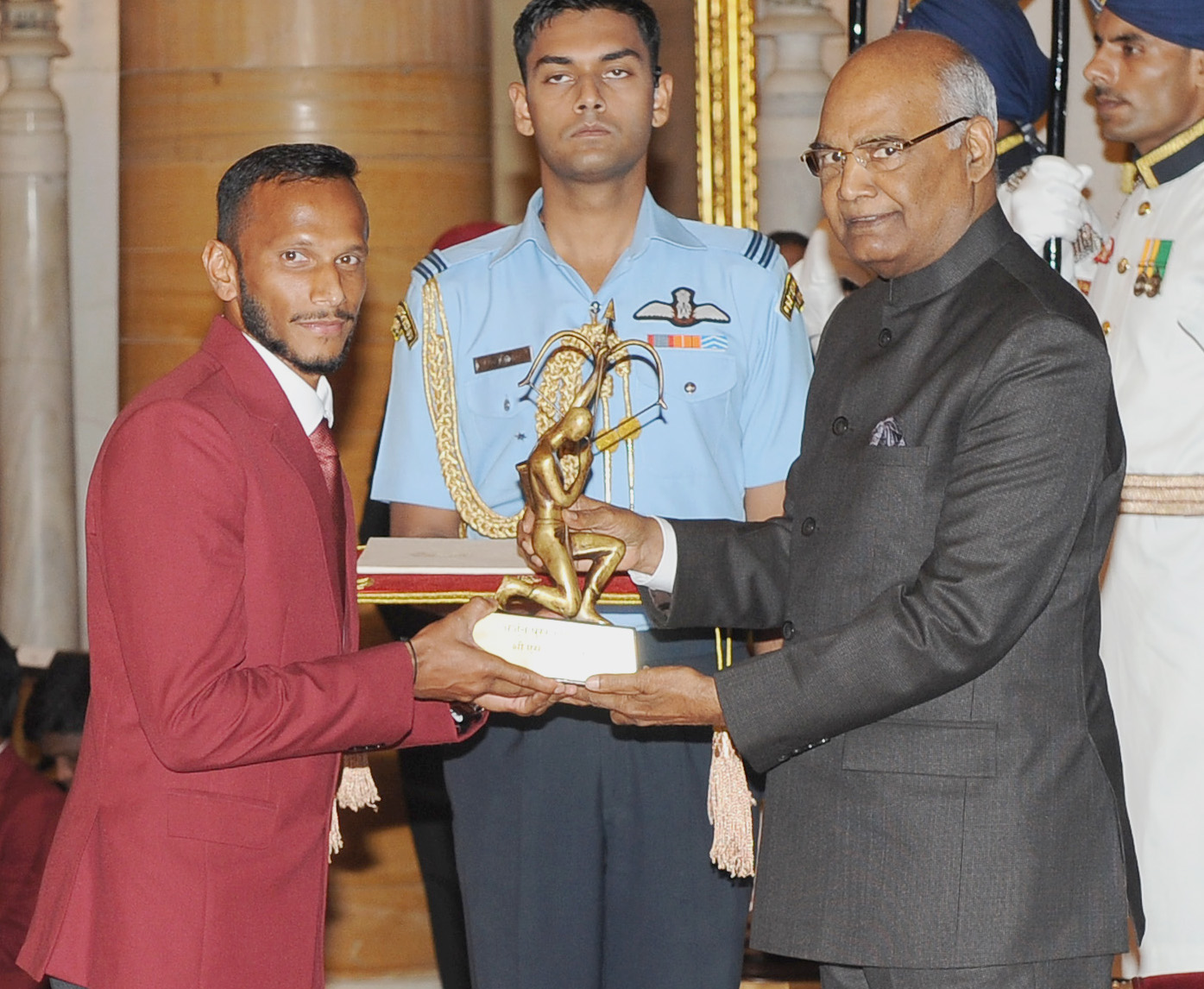
- Sunil (left) receiving the Arjuna Award, 2017

Personal information
- Full name: Somwarpet Vittalacharya Sunil
- Born: 6 May 1989 (age 37) Kodagu, Karnataka, India
- Height: 1.76 m (5 ft 9 in)

Sport
- Sport: Field hockey
- Position: Halfback
Senior career
Years	Team	Caps	Goals
2007	Chennai Veerans	-	-
2008	Bangalore Hi-Fliers	-	-
–	Services	-	-
–	IOCL	-	-
2013–2017	Punjab Warriors	-	13
2022	Walton Dhaka	-	-
National team
Years	Team	Caps	Goals
2007–2022	India	271	(75)
Medal record
Men's field hockey
Representing India
Asian Games
Gold medal – first place	2014 Incheon	Team
Bronze medal – third place	2018 Jakarta	Team
Asia Cup
Gold medal – first place	2007 Chennai
Gold medal – first place	2017 Dhaka
Bronze medal – third place	2022 Jakarta
Champions Trophy
Silver medal – second place	2016 London
Silver medal – second place	2018 Breda
Asian Champions Trophy
Gold medal – first place	2011 Ordos City
Silver medal – second place	2012 Doha
Commonwealth Games
Silver medal – second place	2014 Glasgow	Team
Hockey World League
Bronze medal – third place	2014–15 Raipur	Team
Bronze medal – third place	2016–17 Bhubaneswar	Team

Somwarpet Vittalacharya Sunil (born 6 May 1989) is an Indian former field hockey player who played for the Indian national team. He represented India during the 2012 London Olympics and won silver with them at the 2014 Commonwealth Games. He received the Arjun Award in 2017.

== Early life ==
Sunil was born on 6 May 1989 to Vittalacharya and Shanta in the Kodagu district of Karnataka, is a Vishwakarma Brahmin and is an ethnic Kannadiga. At the age of four, he lost his mother. His father worked as a carpenter and his brother, a goldsmith. Born into a poor family, Sunil used bamboo for a hockey stick during his younger days.

== Career ==
Sunil took up hockey when he was 14 and trained at the Boys' Sports Company in Bangalore. In 2005, he was drafted into the Indian Army Service Corps as a havildar, where he shone as a player in the inter-services league. In 2007, he was signed by Chennai Veerans to play in the inaugural edition of the Premier Hockey League. The following season, he played for Bangalore Hi-Fliers.

Sunil made his senior international debut in 2007 during the Asia Cup in Chennai, a tournament that India went on to win. His first scoring game was against Sri Lanka in which he scored a hat-trick. India defeated South Korea in the final of the tournament by a 7–2 margin, with Sunil scoring the second goal for his team. In the 2008 edition of the Sultan Azlan Shah Cup, Sunil scored his only goal against Belgium. India went to on to lose to Argentina in the final. Sunil traveled with the team for the tournament's next edition to Malaysia. However, news of his father's death reached him a few hours before India's opening match against Egypt. Sunil went on to play the match, despite being asked by coach Harendra Singh to return home. He later remarked later that he was inspired by cricketer Sachin Tendulkar who played under similar circumstances.

Having played through a right knee injury meant Sunil had to pull out of three major events of 2010: the World Cup, Commonwealth Games and the Asian Games. He returned to the squad after a surgery, and trained to ensure that he was "faster than ever before". He was a member of the squad that won gold at the inaugural edition of the Asian Champions Trophy in 2011. He scored four goals in the Champions Challenge I later that year and was the most by an India forward. He had a successful outing in the qualifying round for the 2012 London Olympics but a poor finals with his team finishing last. He won bronze with India in the Sultan Azlan Shah Cup a few prior scoring two goals in the tournament. His first goal, the winner, came against Pakistan in the 69th minute in a 2–1 victory. He was included in Azlan Shah XI, the team of the tournament.

=== Hockey India League ===
In the auction of the Hockey India League in 2013, Sunil was bought by the Punjab franchise for US$42,000 with his base price being US$13,900. The Punjab team was named Punjab Warriors. The team won in the 2016 season defeating Kalinga Lancers 6–1 in the final.

=== 2014–present ===
Sunil represented India at the 2014 Commonwealth Games, where India won the silver medal. He was a regular member of the India squad until he was first dropped for his team's Argentina leg of the 2020–21 season of Pro League. He was again left out of the squad named for the 2020 Tokyo Olympics. He subsequently announced retirement from the national team in October 2021. However, he came back from retirement a few months later and was included in India 'A' core probables, picked up to train a developmental group for the senior national team. He was named in the squad for the 2022 Asia Cup and was appointed vice-captain; India fielded its 'A' team for the competition.

In 2023, Sunil turned up for his home state of Karnataka in the Murugappa Gold Cup tournament. In the semi-final against Indian Army, he scored in sudden death after a 2–2 draw to take his team to the final. Karnataka went on to lose to Railways in the final by a 5–2 margin.
