= Muhammad Tousiq =

Pakistani field hockey player (born 1995)

Medal record

Men's field Hockey

Representing Pakistan

Asian Games
| Gold medal – first place | 2010 Guangzhou | Team |

Asian Champions Trophy
| Gold medal – first place | 2012 Doha | |
| Gold medal – first place | 2013 Kakamigahara | |
| Silver medal – second place | 2011 Ordos City | |

Champions Trophy
| Silver medal – second place | 2014 Bhubaneswar | Team |
| Bronze medal – third place | 2012 Melbourne | Team |

Muhammad Tousiq, born on 5 January 1995, is a professional field hockey player from Pakistan.

== Career ==
=== 2010 ===
In November, Tousiq was part of the gold medal-winning team at the Asian Games in Guangzhou, China.

=== 2011 ===
Tousiq was part of the Pakistan team at the 2011 Men's Hockey Champions Trophy in Auckland where he was the youngest player and goalscorer at age 16.

=== 2014 ===
In August, Tousiq was named Asian Player of the Year by the Asian Hockey Federation.

In December 2014, the FIH banned Tousiq for one match after he made obscene gestures towards the crowd during the 2014 Men's Hockey Champions Trophy in India.
