= Wade Paton =

South African field hockey player

Personal information
- Born: 21 March 1986 (age 40) Durban
- Height: 176 cm (5 ft 9 1/2 in)
- Weight: 75 kg (165 lb)

Sport
- Sport: Field hockey
- Club: KZN Coastals Raiders
National team
Years	Team	Caps	Goals
2010-2017	South Africa	122	(8)
2017-2018	South Africa (Indoor)	11	(7)
Medal record
Representing South Africa
African Cup of Nations
Gold medal – first place	2013 Nairobi
- Updated on 29 December 2021

Wade Paton (born 21 March 1986 in Durban) is a South African field hockey player. At the 2012 Summer Olympics, he competed for the national team in the tournament. He has captained the South African team, deputizing in place of Austin Smith when Smith was injured.

He is an alumnus of Northwood School in Durban North. Wade was a Prefect in his matric year.

His father is Alan Paton, who owns The Hockey Shop Durban, which is situated at Northwood Boys High School. The brother of Taine Paton.
