= Shakeel Abbasi =

Pakistani field hockey player

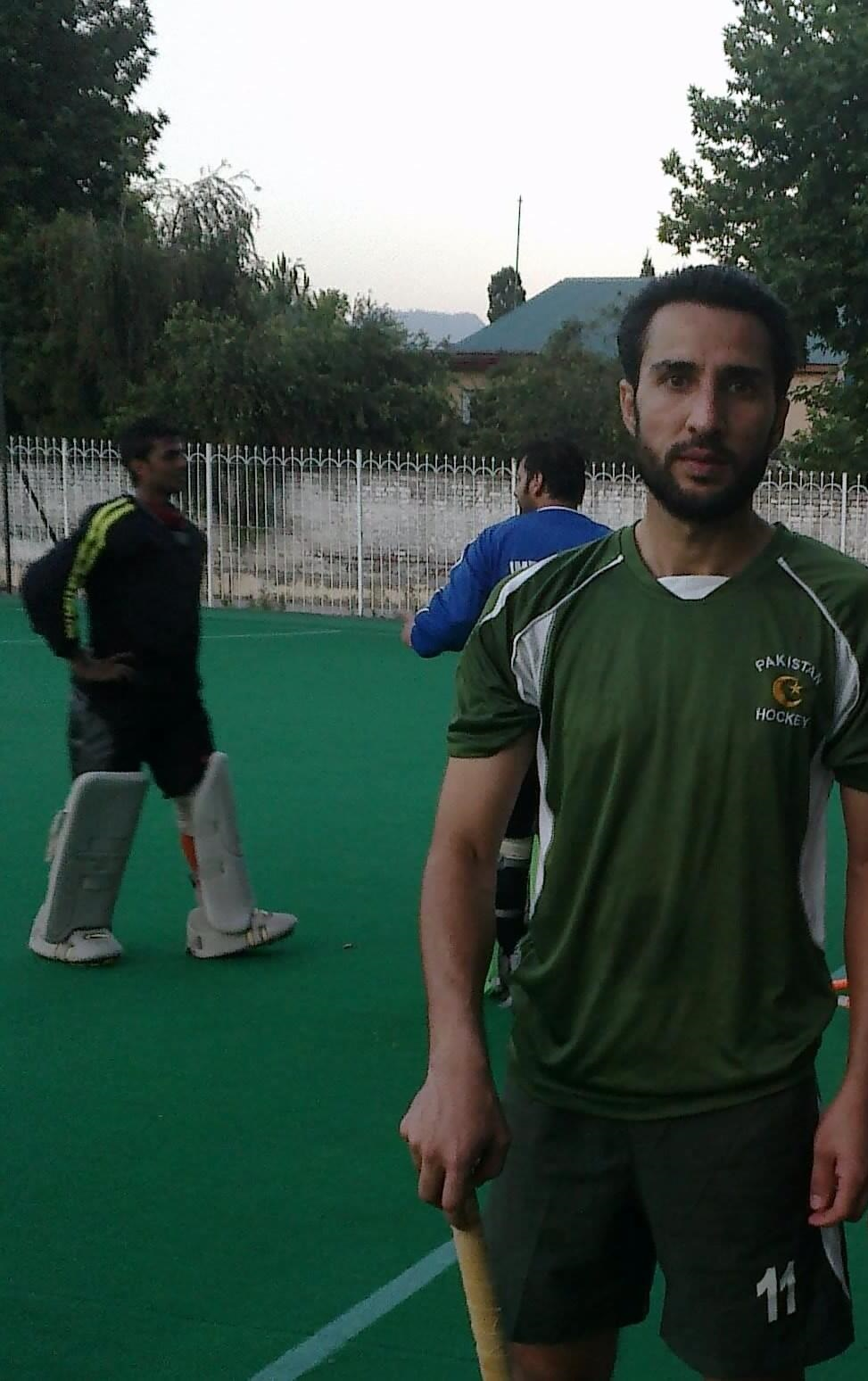
- Abbasi during a training session in 2013

Personal information
- Full name: Shakeel Abbasi Khan
- Born: 5 January 1984 (age 42) Quetta, Pakistan

Sport
- Sport: Field hockey
- Position: Forward
National team
| Years | Team | Caps | Goals |
| 2003–2014 | Pakistan | 309 | (103) |

Shakeel Abbasi
Medal record

Men's Field hockey

Representing Pakistan

Asian Games
| Gold medal – first place | 2010 Guangzhou | Team |
| Silver medal – second place | 2014 Korea | Team |
| Bronze medal – third place | 2006 Doha | Team |

Commonwealth Games
| Silver medal – second place | 2006 Melbourne | Team |

Champions Trophy
| Bronze medal – third place | 2012 Melbourne | Team |
| Bronze medal – third place | 2004 Lahore | Team |

Asian Champions Trophy
| Gold medal – first place | 2012 Doha | Team |
| Silver medal – second place | 2011 Ordos | Team |

Shakeel Abbasi (born 5 January 1984, Quetta, Pakistan) is a former international field hockey player from Pakistan. He played as a forward, mainly as an inside right or center forward. A skillful forward, Abbasi was regarded as one of the finest players for Pakistan and made over 300 appearances for the national team. He also played for various club sides around the world and was reputed as a world-class player of his era.

== Early life ==
Abbasi was born in Quetta, Pakistan on 5 January 1984. A good sportsman Abbasi played various sports during his school and college days, influenced by his peers specially his elder brother who recommended him to continue in hockey seeing his promising prospect in it. Abbasi then started giving hockey his full-time attention joining hockey academies in his hometown.

== Career ==
=== 2006 ===
He was part of the team which won the silver medal at the 2006 Commonwealth Games in Melbourne, Australia and the bronze medal at the 2006 Asian Games in Doha, Qatar.

=== 2008 ===
Abbasi was part of the squad which placed 8th at the Beijing Olympics in 2008.

=== 2010 ===
Abbasi was awarded a Category A central contract for the year.

He toured Europe as part of the national team's preparations for the Commonwealth Games in September.

He was part of the sixth place team at the 2010 Commonwealth Games in New Delhi, India. In the first match, he scored Pakistan's opening goal in the 3–0 victory over Scotland.

In November 2010, Abbasi was part of the team at the Asian Games in Guangzhou, China.

=== 2011 ===
Abbasi was part of the Pakistani team that won the silver medal at 2011 Asian Men's Hockey Champions Trophy, Ordos, China.

=== 2012 ===
Abbasi was likely to be picked for the upcoming 2012 Summer Olympics according to Pakistan Hockey Federation secretary Asif Bajwa's reported statement to the news media.

== See also ==
- Pakistan national field hockey team
