= Abdul Haseem Khan =

Pakistani field hockey player

Medal record

Men's field hockey

Representing Pakistan

Asian Games
Gold medal – first place	2010 Guangzhou	Team

Asia Cup
Silver medal – second place	2009 Kuantan	

Asian Champions Trophy
Gold medal – first place	2012 Doha	
Gold medal – first place	2013 Kakamigahara	
Silver medal – second place	2011 Ordos City	

Champions Trophy
Bronze medal – third place	2012 Melbourne	Team

Abdul Haseem Khan (born 15 July 1987 in Karachi) is a field hockey player from Pakistan.

== Career ==
=== 2010 ===
In November, Khan was part of the gold medal winning team at the Asian Games in Guangzhou, China.

== See also ==
Pakistan national field hockey team
