= Shafqat Rasool =

Pakistani field hockey player

Personal information
- Born: 10 December 1988 (age 37)
Medal record
Men's field hockey
Representing Pakistan
Asian Games
Gold medal – first place	2010 Guangzhou	Team
Asian Champions Trophy
Gold medal – first place	2012 Doha
Gold medal – first place	2013 Kakamigahara
Silver medal – second place	2011 Ordos City
Champions Trophy
Silver medal – second place	2014 Bhubaneswar	Team
Bronze medal – third place	2012 Melbourne	Team

Shafqat Rasool (born 10 December 1988, Toba Tek Singh) is a Pakistani field hockey player. On 3 April 2021, he was banned from all competition for 10 years after "indulging in a fight during a match." However, the ban was lifted on 3 October 2021, by a fact-finding committee.

== Career ==
=== 2008 ===
Rasool was part of the Pakistan squad at the 2008 Olympics, playing in all 6 of Pakistan's games and scoring 1 goal.

=== 2010 ===
Rasool took part in the 2010 Commonwealth Games in New Delhi, India. Late in November, he was part of the gold medal winning team at the Asian Games in Guangzhou, China.

=== 2012 ===
Rasool played in all of Pakistan's games at the 2012 Summer Olympics, again scoring 1 goal.
