= Nam Hyun-woo (field hockey) =

South Korean field hockey player (born 1987)

- Hangul: 남현우
- RR: Nam Hyeonu
- MR: Nam Hyŏnu

Nam Hyun-woo
Medal record

Men's field hockey

Representing South Korea

Asian Games
Bronze medal – third place	2014 Incheon	Team

Asia Cup
Gold medal – first place	2009 Kuantan	

Nam Hyun-woo (born July 15, 1987, Seoul) is a South Korean field hockey player who plays as a defender. At the 2012 Summer Olympics, he competed for the national team in the men's tournament.
