= 2024–25 Hockey India League =

Held from December 2024 to February 2025

Men's Hockey India League
Tournament details
- Dates: 28 December 2024 – 1 February 2025
- Administrator(s): Hockey India
- Format(s): Double round-robin Knock-out
- Host(s): India
- Venue(s): Birsa Munda International Hockey Stadium, Rourkela; Jaipal Singh Stadium, Ranchi
- Teams: 8

Final positions
- Champions: Rarh Bengal Tigers (1st title)
- Runner-up: Hyderabad Toofans
- Third Place: Soorma Hockey Club

Tournament summary
- Matches played: 44
- Goals scored: 199 (4.52 per match)
- Player of the tournament: Sukhjeet Singh
- Most goals: Jugraj Singh (12 goals)
- Attendance: 21,800 for the final

Women's Hockey India League
Tournament details
- Dates: 12 January 2025 – 26 January 2025
- Administrator(s): Hockey India
- Format(s): Double round-robin Knock-out
- Host(s): India
- Venue(s): Jaipal Singh Stadium, Ranchi; Birsa Munda Stadium, Rourkela
- Teams: 4

Final positions
- Champions: Odisha Warriors (1st title)
- Runner-up: Soorma Hockey Club
- Third Place: Rarh Bengal Tigers

Tournament summary
- Matches played: 13
- Goals scored: 41 (3.15 per match)
- Player of the tournament: Jyoti Rumavat
- Most goals: Charlotte Englebert; Yibbi Jansen (5 goals)
- Attendance: 5,000 for the final

The 2024–25 Hockey India League was the sixth season of the annual Hockey India League. It was held from 28 December 2024 to 1 February 2025. The women's league was won by Odisha Warriors while Rarh Bengal Tigers won the men's league.

== Format ==
Eight teams for the men's tournament and four teams for the women's tournament are placed in a group to play round-robin matches. The top four teams qualify for the knockout stage. Playing eleven, teams had to have a minimum of two and a maximum of five foreign players.

== Owners ==
Franchise	Location	Owners	Men's	Women's
Delhi SG Pipers	New Delhi, Delhi	SG Sports	Yes	Yes
Hyderabad Toofans	Hyderabad, Telangana	Resolute Sports	Yes	No
Kalinga Lancers	Bhubaneswar, Odisha	Vedanta Limited	Yes	No
Odisha Warriors	Rourkela, Odisha	Navoyam Sports Ventures	No	Yes
Rarh Bengal Tigers	Kolkata, West Bengal	Shrachi Sports	Yes	Yes
Soorma Hockey Club	Punjab; Haryana	JSW Group	Yes	Yes
Tamil Nadu Dragons	Chennai, Tamil Nadu	Charles Group	Yes	No
Team Gonasika	Visakhapatnam, Andhra Pradesh	Tarini Prasad Mohanty	Yes	No
UP Rudras	Lucknow, Uttar Pradesh	JK Group	Yes	No
Total			8	4

== Venues ==
The matches were held across two cities, Ranchi and Rourkela. While women's games were hosted at the Jaipal Singh Stadium in Ranchi, the men's games were held at the Birsa Munda International Hockey Stadium in Rourkela.

Venues of the 2024–25 Hockey India League
2024–25 Hockey India League is located in India
Rourkela	Ranchi
Birsa Munda International Hockey Stadium	Jaipal Singh Stadium
Capacity: 21,800	Capacity: 5,000

== Men's HIL ==
=== Standings ===
Pos	Team	Pld	W	SOW	SOL	L	GF	GA	GD	Pts	
1	Rarh Bengal Tigers (C)	10	6	0	1	3	24	22	+2	19	Qualified to knockouts
2	Soorma Hockey Club	10	4	3	1	2	19	18	+1	19	Qualified to knockouts
3	Hyderabad Toofans	10	4	2	2	2	26	16	+10	18	Qualified to knockouts
4	Tamil Nadu Dragons	10	4	2	2	2	22	23	−1	18	Qualified to knockouts
5	UP Rudras	10	5	1	0	4	18	17	+1	17	
6	Kalinga Lancers	10	3	1	1	5	31	31	0	12	
7	Team Gonasika	10	3	1	1	5	21	22	−1	12	
8	Delhi SG Pipers	10	0	1	3	6	18	30	−12	5	

Source: Hockey India
Rules for classification: 1) Points: Win (3) Draw (1) Shoot-out win (1); 2) matches won; 3) goal difference; 4) goals scored; 5) head-to-head points, goal difference & goals scored; 6) shoot‐out competition
(C) Champion

=== League stage ===
==== Phase 1 ====
28 December 2024
20:15 UTC+5:30

Team Gonasika	2–2	Delhi SG Pipers
Walker 26'; Charlet 35'	Report	Domene 5', 39'
Penalties
Walker (penalty shoot-out missed); Manpreet (penalty shoot-out missed); Morton (penalty shoot-out scored); Clément (penalty shoot-out scored)	2–4	(penalty shoot-out scored) Whetton; (penalty shoot-out scored) Domene; (penalty shoot-out missed) Willott; (penalty shoot-out scored) Kushwaha; (penalty shoot-out scored) Raj Kumar

Birsa Munda International Hockey Stadium, Rourkela
Umpires:
Raghu Prasad (IND)
James Unkles (AUS)

29 December 2024
18:00 UTC+5:30

Hyderabad Toofans	2–3	Rarh Bengal Tigers
Brand 41'; De Sloover 59'	Report	Jugraj 9'; Sukhjeet 20'; Yousuf 36'

Birsa Munda International Hockey Stadium, Rourkela
Umpires:
Coen van Bunge (NED)
Sourabh Rajput (IND)

29 December 2024
20:15 UTC+5:30

Soorma Hockey Club	1–1	Tamil Nadu Dragons
Gurjant 54'	Report	Ephraums 49'
Penalties
Harmanpreet (penalty shoot-out scored); Wegnez (penalty shoot-out scored); Prasad (penalty shoot-out scored); Keenan (penalty shoot-out scored)	4–1	(penalty shoot-out missed) Craig; (penalty shoot-out scored) Ludwig; (penalty shoot-out missed) Sorsby

Birsa Munda International Hockey Stadium, Rourkela
Umpires:
Deepak Joshi (IND)
You Hyosik (KOR)

30 December 2024
20:15 UTC+5:30

UP Rudras	3–1	Kalinga Lancers
Russell 45' 60'; Chirmako 50'	Report	González 13'

Birsa Munda International Hockey Stadium, Rourkela
Umpires:
James Unkles (AUS)
Anand Dangi (IND)

31 December 2024
20:15 UTC+5:30

Delhi SG Pipers	2–2	Hyderabad Toofans
Dilraj 21'; Furlong 50'	Report	Amandeep 11'; Peillat 13'
Penalties
Whetton (penalty shoot-out scored); Domene (penalty shoot-out scored); Yamasaki (penalty shoot-out scored); Domene (penalty shoot-out scored); Raj Kumar (penalty shoot-out missed); Yamasaki (penalty shoot-out missed)	4–5	(penalty shoot-out scored) Wallace; (penalty shoot-out scored) Talwinder; (penalty shoot-out scored) Casella; (penalty shoot-out scored) Shilanand; (penalty shoot-out missed) Sharma; (penalty shoot-out scored) Wallace

Birsa Munda International Hockey Stadium, Rourkela
Umpires:
Napoleon Chanamthabam (IND)
Coen van Bunge (NED)

1 January 2025
20:15 UTC+5:30

Rarh Bengal Tigers	2–1	Team Gonasika
Rupinder 31', 48'	Report	Manpreet 32'

Birsa Munda International Hockey Stadium, Rourkela
Umpires:
Gurbaj Singh (IND)
You Hyosik (KOR)

2 January 2025
20:15 UTC+5:30

Soorma Hockey Club	0–3	UP Rudras
	Report	Chirmako 2'; Jobanpreet 38'; Akashdeep 58'

Birsa Munda International Hockey Stadium, Rourkela
Umpires:
Shakil Ahmad (IND)
Raghu Prasad (IND)

3 January 2025
20:15 UTC+5:30

Tamil Nadu Dragons	2–2	Kalinga Lancers
Craig 31'; Janssen 51'	Report	Hendrickx 24' 43'
Penalties
Ludwig (penalty shoot-out scored); Chandan (penalty shoot-out missed); Ephraums (penalty shoot-out scored); Uttam (penalty shoot-out scored); Govers (penalty shoot-out scored); Ephraums (penalty shoot-out scored); Ludwig (penalty shoot-out scored)	6–5	(penalty shoot-out missed) Van Doren; (penalty shoot-out scored) Angad; (penalty shoot-out scored) Brinkman; (penalty shoot-out scored) Kina; (penalty shoot-out scored) Dilpreet; (penalty shoot-out scored) Brinkman; (penalty shoot-out missed) Dilpreet

Birsa Munda International Hockey Stadium, Rourkela
Umpires:
Coen van Bunge (NED)
Anand Dangi (IND)

4 January 2025
18:00 UTC+5:30

Delhi SG Pipers	1–4	Rarh Bengal Tigers
Furlong 53'	Report	Sukhjeet 1'; Jugraj 17' 38'; Abhishek 47'

Birsa Munda International Hockey Stadium, Rourkela
Umpires:
Deepak Joshi (IND)
James Unkles (AUS)

4 January 2025
20:15 UTC+5:30

Hyderabad Toofans	1–3	Team Gonasika
Brand 12'	Report	Sunil 2'; Charlet 33'; Nilam 60'

Birsa Munda International Hockey Stadium, Rourkela
Umpires:
Sourabh Rajput (IND)
Napoleon Chanamthabam (IND)

5 January 2025
18:00 UTC+5:30

Kalinga Lancers	3–4	Soorma Hockey Club
Brinkman 5'; Sanjay 15'; Gursahibjit 50'	Report	Hayward 11'; Torre 35'; Harmanpreet 49'; Harish 52'

Birsa Munda International Hockey Stadium, Rourkela
Umpires:
Shakil Ahmad (IND)
Coen van Bunge (NED)

5 January 2025
20:15 UTC+5:30

Tamil Nadu Dragons	2–0	UP Rudras
Abharan 48'; Sorsby 60'	Report

Birsa Munda International Hockey Stadium, Rourkela
Umpires:
Gurbaj Singh (IND)
Raghu Prasad (IND)

6 January 2025
20:15 UTC+5:30

Soorma Hockey Club	2–2	Delhi SG Pipers
Harmanpreet 48', 57'	Report	Domene 43'; Manjeet 45'
Penalties
Sunit (penalty shoot-out missed); Roper (penalty shoot-out missed); Vivek (penalty shoot-out scored); Keenan (penalty shoot-out scored); Burkhardt (penalty shoot-out scored)	3–1	(penalty shoot-out missed) Whetton; (penalty shoot-out missed) Domene; (penalty shoot-out scored) Lalage; (penalty shoot-out missed) Kushwaha

Birsa Munda International Hockey Stadium, Rourkela
Umpires:
You Hyosik (KOR)
Anand Dangi (IND)

7 January 2025
20:15 UTC+5:30

Kalinga Lancers	6–0	Rarh Bengal Tigers
Brinkman 3', 29', 47'; Sanjay 4'; Hendrickx 6'; Dhami 49'	Report

Birsa Munda International Hockey Stadium, Rourkela
Umpires:
Deepak Joshi (IND)
Sourabh Rajput (IND)

8 January 2025
18:00 UTC+5:30

Team Gonasika	5–6	Tamil Nadu Dragons
Araijeet 5', 7'; Nikkin 39'; Walker 43'; Clément 58'	Report	Abharan 15'; Janssen 19', 33', 50'; Ephraums 55'; Karthi 59'

Birsa Munda International Hockey Stadium, Rourkela
Umpires:
Raghu Prasad (IND)
You Hyosik (KOR)

8 January 2025
20:15 UTC+5:30

UP Rudras	0–3	Hyderabad Toofans
	Report	Wallace 6'; Rajinder 14'; Shilanand 32'

Birsa Munda International Hockey Stadium, Rourkela
Umpires:
James Unkles (AUS)
Coen van Bunge (NED)

9 January 2025
20:15 UTC+5:30

Kalinga Lancers	2–1	Team Gonasika
Kina 28'; Zalewski 33'	Report	Sunil 14'

Birsa Munda International Hockey Stadium, Rourkela
Umpires:
Gurbaj Singh (IND)
Coen van Bunge (NED)

10 January 2025
20:15 UTC+5:30

Rarh Bengal Tigers	1–2	Tamil Nadu Dragons
Rupinder 35'	Report	Karthi 16'; Uttam 37'

Birsa Munda International Hockey Stadium, Rourkela
Umpires:
James Unkles (AUS)
Shakil Ahmad (IND)

11 January 2025
18:00 UTC+5:30

Hyderabad Toofans	1–1	Soorma Hockey Club
Amandeep 40'	Report	Torre 8'
Penalties
Casella (penalty shoot-out missed); Talwinder (penalty shoot-out missed); Wallace (penalty shoot-out scored); Arshdeep (penalty shoot-out scored); Brand (penalty shoot-out scored); Wallace (penalty shoot-out scored)	4–3	(penalty shoot-out missed) Vivek; (penalty shoot-out scored) Poncelet; (penalty shoot-out scored) Gurjant; (penalty shoot-out missed) Keenan; (penalty shoot-out scored) Burkhardt; (penalty shoot-out missed) Poncelet

Birsa Munda International Hockey Stadium, Rourkela
Umpires:
Deepak Joshi (IND)
Anand Dangi (IND)

11 January 2025
20:15 UTC+5:30

Delhi SG Pipers	1–3	UP Rudras
Whetton 29'	Report	Wortelboer 30'; Russell 43'; Cosyns 54'

Birsa Munda International Hockey Stadium, Rourkela
Umpires:
Raghu Prasad (IND)
Napoleon Chanamthabam (IND)

12 January 2025
18:00 UTC+5:30

Kalinga Lancers	1–5	Hyderabad Toofans
Hendrickx 5'	Report	Peillat 6', 30'; Casella 21'; Brand 47'; Arshdeep 54'

Birsa Munda International Hockey Stadium, Rourkela
Umpires:
You Hyosik (KOR)
Sourabh Rajput (IND)

13 January 2025
20:15 UTC+5:30

Tamil Nadu Dragons	3–2	Delhi SG Pipers
Janssen 6'; Ephraums 19'; Govers 21'	Report	Domene 2', 37'

Birsa Munda International Hockey Stadium, Rourkela
Umpires:
Coen van Bunge (NED)
Raghu Prasad (IND)

14 January 2025
20:15 UTC+5:30

Team Gonasika	2–1	Soorma Hockey Club
Nilam 33'; Morton 59'	Report	Pawan 48'

Birsa Munda International Hockey Stadium, Rourkela
Umpires:
James Unkles (AUS)
Sourabh Rajput (IND)

15 January 2025
20:15 UTC+5:30

UP Rudras	3–5	Rarh Bengal Tigers
Hardik 47'; Ward 51', 59'	Report	Boccard 8'; Jugraj 10', 33'; Sukhjeet 14'; Nain 46'

Birsa Munda International Hockey Stadium, Rourkela
Umpires:
Gurbaj Singh (IND)
You Hyosik (KOR)

16 January 2025
20:15 UTC+5:30

Delhi SG Pipers	1–5	Kalinga Lancers
Weyer 56'	Report	Bandurak 11'; Van Doren 36'; Brinkman 38', 43'; Gursahibjit 45'

Birsa Munda International Hockey Stadium, Rourkela
Umpires:
Anand Dangi (IND)
James Unkles (AUS)

18 January 2025
18:00 UTC+5:30

Hyderabad Toofans	4–0	Tamil Nadu Dragons
Peillat 21', 48'; De Sloover 31'; Brand 33'	Report

Jaipal Singh Stadium, Ranchi
Umpires:
You Hyosik (KOR)
Anand Dangi (IND)

18 January 2025
20:15 UTC+5:30

Team Gonasika	0–1	UP Rudras
	Report	Hardik 15'

Jaipal Singh Stadium, Ranchi
Umpires:
James Unkles (AUS)
Sourabh Rajput (IND)

29 January 2025
18:00 UTC+5:30

Soorma Hockey Club	1–1	Rarh Bengal Tigers
Gurjant 10'	Report	Jugraj 56'
Penalties
Harmanpreet (penalty shoot-out scored); Vivek (penalty shoot-out scored); Wegnez (penalty shoot-out scored)	3–0	(penalty shoot-out missed) Gursewak; (penalty shoot-out missed) Cross; (penalty shoot-out missed) Sandhu

Birsa Munda International Hockey Stadium, Rourkela
Umpires:
James Unkles (AUS)
Raghu Prasad (IND)

==== Phase 2 ====
Pool A

- Delhi SG Pipers
- Kalinga Lancers
- Rarh Bengal Tigers
- Soorma Hockey Club

Pool B

- Hyderabad Toofans
- Tamil Nadu Dragons
- Team Gonasika
- UP Rudras

==== Matches ====
19 January 2025
20:15 UTC+5:30

Kalinga Lancers	5–5	Delhi SG Pipers
Hendrickx 13', 52'; Brinkman 35', 47'; Angad 49'	Report	Domene 18', 20'; Weyer 21'; Yamasaki 23'; Dilraj 37'
Penalties
Van Doren (penalty shoot-out scored); Angad (penalty shoot-out missed); Brinkman (penalty shoot-out missed); Kina (penalty shoot-out scored); Hendrickx (penalty shoot-out scored)	3–2	(penalty shoot-out scored) Yamasaki; (penalty shoot-out missed) Domene; (penalty shoot-out scored) Lalage; (penalty shoot-out missed) Kushwaha; (penalty shoot-out missed) Raj Kumar

Birsa Munda International Hockey Stadium, Rourkela
Umpires:
Balaji Kumar (IND)
Raghu Prasad (IND)

20 January 2025
20:15 UTC+5:30

Rarh Bengal Tigers	1–2	Soorma Hockey Club
Jugraj 38'	Report	Prabhjot 21'; Maninder 28'

Birsa Munda International Hockey Stadium, Rourkela
Umpires:
Coen van Bunge (NED)
James Unkles (AUS)

21 January 2025
20:15 UTC+5:30

UP Rudras	2–0	Team Gonasika
Cosyns 37'; Russell 40'	Report

Birsa Munda International Hockey Stadium, Rourkela
Umpires:
James Unkles (AUS)
Balaji Kumar (IND)

22 January 2025
20:15 UTC+5:30

Delhi SG Pipers	1–2	Soorma Hockey Club
Weyer 59'	Report	Harjeet 9'; Gurjant 17'

Jaipal Singh Stadium, Ranchi
Umpires:
Coen van Bunge (NED)
Sourabh Rajput (IND)

23 January 2025
20:15 UTC+5:30

Tamil Nadu Dragons	2–2	Hyderabad Toofans
Govers 4'; Janssen 37'	Report	Brand 3'; Casella 59'
Penalties
Ludwig (penalty shoot-out scored); Uttam (penalty shoot-out scored); Govers (penalty shoot-out missed); Raheel (penalty shoot-out missed); Ephraums (penalty shoot-out scored); Ludwig (penalty shoot-out missed); Ephraums (penalty shoot-out scored)	4–3	(penalty shoot-out missed) Shilanand; (penalty shoot-out scored) Wallace; (penalty shoot-out scored) Casella; (penalty shoot-out missed) Arshdeep; (penalty shoot-out scored) Brand; (penalty shoot-out missed) Casella; (penalty shoot-out missed) Wallace

Birsa Munda International Hockey Stadium, Rourkela
Umpires:
Deepak Joshi (IND)
You Hyosik (KOR)

24 January 2025
20:15 UTC+5:30

Rarh Bengal Tigers	5–3	Kalinga Lancers
Jugraj 10', 27'; Rupinder 16'; Abhishek 30'; Pardeep 40'	Report	Angad 5'; Brinkman 11'; Hendrickx 33'

Jaipal Singh Stadium, Ranchi
Umpires:
Coen van Bunge (NED)
Raghu Prasad (IND)

25 January 2025
18:00 UTC+5:30

Tamil Nadu Dragons	2–4	Team Gonasika
Amit 8'; Craig 56'	Report	Hundal 14'; Waller 45'; Howard 50'; Nikkin 51'

Birsa Munda International Hockey Stadium, Rourkela
Umpires:
Sourabh Rajput (IND)
Raghu Prasad (IND)

25 January 2025
20:15 UTC+5:30

Hyderabad Toofans	3–1	UP Rudras
Peillat 25'; Arshdeep 28', 60'	Report	Jobanpreet 40'

Birsa Munda International Hockey Stadium, Rourkela
Umpires:
Coen van Bunge (NED)
James Unkles (AUS)

27 January 2025
18:00 UTC+5:30

Rarh Bengal Tigers	2–1	Delhi SG Pipers
Rupinder 55'; Dockier 59'	Report	Domene 27'

Birsa Munda International Hockey Stadium, Rourkela
Umpires:
Anand Dangi (IND)
Raghu Prasad (IND)

27 January 2025
20:15 UTC+5:30

Soorma Hockey Club	5–3	Kalinga Lancers
Prabhjot 26'; Harmanpreet 32', 54'; Keenan 33'; Maninder 51'	Report	Dilpreet 5'; Brinkman 44'; Gursahibjit 56'

Birsa Munda International Hockey Stadium, Rourkela
Umpires:
You Hyosik (KOR)
Sourabh Rajput (IND)

28 January 2025
20:15 UTC+5:30

Team Gonasika	3–3	Hyderabad Toofans
Charlet 12', 55'; Hundal 24'	Report	Anderson 1'; Brand 6'; Amandeep 25'
Penalties
Hundal (penalty shoot-out missed); Clément (penalty shoot-out scored); Morton (penalty shoot-out scored); Waller (penalty shoot-out scored)	3–1	(penalty shoot-out scored) Devindar; (penalty shoot-out missed) Sumit; (penalty shoot-out missed) Anderson; (penalty shoot-out missed) Rajinder

Birsa Munda International Hockey Stadium, Rourkela
Umpires:
Gurbaj Singh (IND)
Sourabh Rajput (IND)

29 January 2025
20:15 UTC+5:30

UP Rudras	2–2	Tamil Nadu Dragons
Sudeep 8'; Lalit 15'	Report	Janssen 32'; Sorsby 53'
Penalties
Albery (penalty shoot-out missed); Gurjot (penalty shoot-out missed); Cosyns (penalty shoot-out scored); Wortelboer (penalty shoot-out missed); Manmeet (penalty shoot-out scored); Manmeet (penalty shoot-out missed); Cosyns (penalty shoot-out scored)	3–2	(penalty shoot-out missed) Anand; (penalty shoot-out scored) Chandan; (penalty shoot-out missed) Pruthvi; (penalty shoot-out scored) Ganesh; (penalty shoot-out missed) Arun; (penalty shoot-out missed) Ganesh; (penalty shoot-out missed) Arun

Birsa Munda International Hockey Stadium, Rourkela
Umpires:
Coen van Bunge (NED)
You Hyosik (KOR)

=== Knockouts ===
Semi-finals
31 January – Rourkela
Rarh Bengal Tigers	2 (6)
Tamil Nadu Dragons	2 (5)
31 January – Rourkela
Soorma Hockey Club	1
Hyderabad Toofans	3

Final
1 February – Rourkela
Rarh Bengal Tigers	4
Hyderabad Toofans	3
Third place
1 February – Rourkela
Tamil Nadu Dragons	2
Soorma Hockey Club	3

==== Semi-finals ====
31 January 2025
18:00 UTC+5:30

Rarh Bengal Tigers	2–2	Tamil Nadu Dragons
Pardeep 30'; Lane 53'	Report	Ephraums 18'; Karthi 32'
Penalties
Van Aubel (penalty shoot-out missed); Sukhjeet (penalty shoot-out scored); Findlay (penalty shoot-out scored); Abhishek (penalty shoot-out missed); Dockier (penalty shoot-out missed); Sukhjeet (penalty shoot-out scored); Findlay (penalty shoot-out scored); Van Aubel (penalty shoot-out scored); Abhishek (penalty shoot-out scored)	6–5	(penalty shoot-out scored) Ludwig; (penalty shoot-out missed) Uttam; (penalty shoot-out scored) Govers; (penalty shoot-out missed) Abharan; (penalty shoot-out missed) Ephraums; (penalty shoot-out scored) Ludwig; (penalty shoot-out scored) Govers; (penalty shoot-out scored) Ephraums; (penalty shoot-out missed) Uttam

Birsa Munda International Hockey Stadium, Rourkela
Umpires:
Raghu Prasad (IND)
James Unkles (AUS)

31 January 2025
20:15 UTC+5:30

Soorma Hockey Club	1–3	Hyderabad Toofans
Hayward 60'	Report	Amandeep 25'; Anderson 25'; Nilakanta 43'

Birsa Munda International Hockey Stadium, Rourkela
Umpires:
Coen van Bunge (NED)
You Hyosik (KOR)

==== Third and fourth place ====
1 February 2025
17:45 UTC+5:30

Tamil Nadu Dragons	2–3	Soorma Hockey Club
Govers 15'; Janssen 59'	Report	Gurjant 12'; Harjeet 19'; Prabhjot 57'

Birsa Munda International Hockey Stadium, Rourkela
Umpires:
James Unkles (AUS)
Sourabh Rajput (IND)

==== Final ====
1 February 2025
20:15 UTC+5:30

Rarh Bengal Tigers	4–3	Hyderabad Toofans
Jugraj 25', 32', 35'; Lane 54'	Report	Peillat 9', 39'; Amandeep 26'

Birsa Munda International Hockey Stadium, Rourkela
Umpires:
Coen van Bunge (NED)
Raghu Prasad (IND)

== Women's HIL ==
=== Standings ===
Pos	Team	Pld	W	SOW	SOL	L	GF	GA	GD	Pts	
1	Soorma Hockey Club	6	4	0	1	1	15	7	+8	13	Qualified to Final
2	Odisha Warriors (C)	6	2	2	1	1	11	5	+6	11	Qualified to Final
3	Rarh Bengal Tigers	6	2	0	1	3	8	13	−5	7	
4	Delhi SG Pipers	6	1	1	0	4	4	13	−9	5	

Source: Hockey India
Rules for classification: 1) Points: Win (3) Draw (1) Shoot-out win (1); 2) matches won; 3) goal difference; 4) goals scored; 5) head-to-head points, goal difference & goals scored; 6) shoot‐out competition
(C) Champion

=== League stage ===
12 January 2025
20:40 UTC+5:30

Delhi SG Pipers	0–4	Odisha Warriors
	Report	Jansen 16', 37'; Baljeet 42'; Moes 43'

Jaipal Singh Stadium, Ranchi
Umpires:
Kelly Hudson (NZL)
Durga Devi (IND)

13 January 2025
18:00 UTC+5:30

Rarh Bengal Tigers	1–4	Soorma Hockey Club
Cotter 7'	Report	Shannon 38'; Englebert 42'; Salima 44'; Sonam 47'

Jaipal Singh Stadium, Ranchi
Umpires:
Rachel Williams (ENG)
Shivani Sharma (IND)

14 January 2025
18:00 UTC+5:30

Delhi SG Pipers	0–1	Rarh Bengal Tigers
	Report	Mullan 23'

Jaipal Singh Stadium, Ranchi
Umpires:
Rama Potnis (IND)
Yogita Pasi (IND)

15 January 2025
18:00 UTC+5:30

Odisha Warriors	1–2	Soorma Hockey Club
Moes 57'	Report	Bano 6'; Sonam 47'

Jaipal Singh Stadium, Ranchi
Umpires:
Kelly Hudson (NZL)
Deepa (IND)

16 January 2025
18:00 UTC+5:30

Rarh Bengal Tigers	1–1	Odisha Warriors
Beauty 16'	Report	Baljeet 8'
Penalties
Crackles (penalty shoot-out scored); Beauty (penalty shoot-out missed); Lalremsiami (penalty shoot-out missed); Stewart (penalty shoot-out scored); Cotter (penalty shoot-out missed)	2–3	(penalty shoot-out scored) Moes; (penalty shoot-out missed) Sakshi; (penalty shoot-out scored) Sonika; (penalty shoot-out scored) Nobbs

Jaipal Singh Stadium, Ranchi
Umpires:
Durga Devi (IND)
Shivani Sharma (IND)

17 January 2025
20:15 UTC+5:30

Delhi SG Pipers	2–0	Soorma Hockey Club
Sangita 35'; Deepika 47'	Report

Birsa Munda International Hockey Stadium, Rourkela
Umpires:
Coen van Bunge (NED)
Gurbaj Singh (IND)

19 January 2025
18:00 UTC+5:30

Odisha Warriors	4–1	Rarh Bengal Tigers
Fillet 16'; Jansen 18', 47'; Goyal 58'	Report	Udita 30'

Birsa Munda International Hockey Stadium, Rourkela
Umpires:
Rachel Williams (ENG)
Rama Potnis (IND)

20 January 2025
18:00 UTC+5:30

Soorma Hockey Club	5–1	Delhi SG Pipers
Englebert 6'; Sonam 9', 10'; Stapenhorst 36'; Squibb 60'	Report	Sangita 38'

Jaipal Singh Stadium, Ranchi
Umpires:
Deepa (IND)
Yogita Pasi (IND)

21 January 2025
18:00 UTC+5:30

Soorma Hockey Club	0–0	Odisha Warriors
	Report
Penalties
Stapenhorst (penalty shoot-out missed); Soreng (penalty shoot-out missed); Verschoor (penalty shoot-out missed); Englebert (penalty shoot-out missed)	0–2	(penalty shoot-out missed) Stoffelsma; (penalty shoot-out missed) Moes; (penalty shoot-out scored) Sonika; (penalty shoot-out scored) Nobbs

Jaipal Singh Stadium, Ranchi
Umpires:
Kelly Hudson (NZL)
Ruchika Wankhede (IND)

22 January 2025
18:00 UTC+5:30

Rarh Bengal Tigers	2–0	Delhi SG Pipers
Mullan 21', 33'	Report

Jaipal Singh Stadium, Ranchi
Umpires:
Durga Devi (IND)
Rachel Williams (ENG)

23 January 2025
18:00 UTC+5:30

Odisha Warriors	1–1	Delhi SG Pipers
Jansen 35'	Report	Navneet 28'
Penalties
Sakshi (penalty shoot-out missed); Nobbs (penalty shoot-out scored); Sonika (penalty shoot-out missed); Baljeet (penalty shoot-out scored); Moes (penalty shoot-out missed)	2–3	(penalty shoot-out missed) Owsley; (penalty shoot-out missed) Mumtaz; (penalty shoot-out scored) Ishika; (penalty shoot-out scored) Navneet; (penalty shoot-out scored) Sunelita

Jaipal Singh Stadium, Ranchi
Umpires:
Deepa (IND)
Rama Potnis (IND)

24 January 2025
18:00 UTC+5:30

Soorma Hockey Club	4–2	Rarh Bengal Tigers
Englebert 1', 17', 47'; Hina 9'	Report	Vandana 48'; Shilpi 58'

Jaipal Singh Stadium, Ranchi
Umpires:
Yogita Pasi (IND)
Ruchika Wankhede (IND)

=== Final ===
26 January 2025
18:00 UTC+5:30

Soorma Hockey Club	1–2	Odisha Warriors
Squibb 28'	Report	Rutuja 20', 56'

Jaipal Singh Stadium, Ranchi
Umpires:
Kelly Hudson (NZL)
Rachel Williams (ENG)

== Final results ==
Season	Winner	Score	Runner up	Venue	Player of the Tournament
Men's league
2024–2025	Rarh Bengal Tigers	4–3	Hyderabad Toofans	Birsa Munda Stadium	Sukhjeet Singh
Women's league
2025	Odisha Warriors	2–1	Soorma Hockey Club	Jaipal Singh Stadium	Jyoti Rumavat

== Top goalscorers ==
=== Men's league ===
Player	Team	Goals
(India) Jugraj Singh	Rarh Bengal Tigers	12
(Netherlands) Thierry Brinkman	Kalinga Lancers	10
(Germany) Gonzalo Peillat	Hyderabad Toofans	9
(Argentina) Tomás Domene	Delhi SG Pipers	8
(Netherlands) Jip Janssen	Tamil Nadu Dragons	8
(Belgium) Alexander Hendrickx	Kalinga Lancers	7
(Australia) Tim Brand	Hyderabad Toofans	6
(India) Rupinder Pal Singh	Rarh Bengal Tigers	5
(India) Harmanpreet Singh	Soorma Hockey Club	5
(New Zealand) Kane Russell	UP Rudras	4

=== Women's league ===
Player	Team	Goals
(Belgium) Charlotte Englebert	Soorma Hockey Club	5
(Netherlands) Yibbi Jansen	Odisha Warriors	5
(India) Sonam	Soorma Hockey Club	4
(Republic of Ireland) Kathryn Mullan	Rarh Bengal Tigers	3
(India) Hina Bano	Soorma Hockey Club	2
(India) Baljeet Kaur	Odisha Warriors	2
(India) Sangita Kumari	Delhi SG Pipers	2
(Netherlands) Freeke Moes	Odisha Warriors	2
(India) Rutaja Pisal	Odisha Warriors	2
(Australia) Penny Squibb	Soorma Hockey Club	2

== Awards ==
=== Women's league ===
Category	Player
Player of the Tournament	(India) Jyoti Rumavat
Top Scorers of the Tournament	(Netherlands) Yibbi Jansen (Belgium) Charlotte Englebert
Best Goalkeeper	(India) Savita Punia
Upcoming Player of the Tournament	(India) Sonam
Fairplay Award	Delhi SG Pipers

=== Men's league ===
Category	Player
Player of the Tournament	(India) Sukhjeet Singh
Top Scorer of the Tournament	(India) Jugraj Singh
Best Goalkeeper	(India) Bikramjit Singh
Upcoming Player of the Tournament	(India) Arshdeep Singh
Fairplay Award	UP Rudras
