= 2025–26 Hockey India League =

Held from December 2025 to February 2026

Men's Hockey India League
Tournament details
- Dates: 3 January 2026 – 26 January 2026
- Administrator(s): Hockey India
- Format(s): Round-robin tournament Knock-out
- Host(s): India
- Venue(s): Mayor Radhakrishnan Hockey Stadium, Chennai; Jaipal Singh Stadium, Ranchi; Kalinga Stadium, Bhubaneswar
- Teams: 8

Final positions
- Champions: Kalinga Lancers
- Runner-up: Ranchi Royals
- Third Place: Hyderabad Toofans

Tournament summary
- Matches played: 33
- Goals scored: 166 (5.03 per match)
- Player of the tournament: Amandeep Lakra (Hyderabad Toofans)
- Most goals: Tom Boon (Hyderabad Toofans)

Women's Hockey India League
Tournament details
- Dates: 28 December 2025 – 10 January 2026
- Administrator(s): Hockey India
- Format(s): Double round-robin Knock-out
- Host(s): India
- Venue(s): Jaipal Singh Stadium, Ranchi
- Teams: 4

Final positions
- Champions: SG Pipers (1st title)
- Runner-up: Bengal Tigers
- Third Place: Ranchi Royals

Tournament summary
- Matches played: 13
- Goals scored: 39 (3 per match)
- Player of the tournament: (India) Navneet Kaur (Delhi SG Pipers)
- Most goals: (Argentina) Agustina Gorzelany (Rarh Bengal Tigers)

The 2025–26 Hockey India League was the seventh season of the annual Hockey India League. It was held from 28 December 2025 and to 26 January 2026. The men's league was won by the Kalinga Lancers, while the SG Pipers won the women's league.

== Format ==
Eight teams for the men's tournament and four teams for the women's tournament are placed in a group to play round-robin matches. The top four teams qualify for the knockout stage. Playing eleven, teams had to have a minimum of two and a maximum of five foreign players.

== Teams ==
Franchise	Location	Owners	Men's	Women's
SG Pipers	—N/a	SG Sports	Yes	Yes
Hyderabad Toofans	Hyderabad, Telangana	Resolute Sports	Yes	No
Kalinga Lancers	Bhubaneswar, Odisha	Vedanta Limited	Yes	No
Ranchi Royals	Ranchi, Jharkhand	Shri Alvish M.A.	Yes	Yes
Bengal Tigers	West Bengal	Shrachi Sports	Yes	Yes
Soorma Hockey Club	Punjab; Haryana	JSW Group	Yes	Yes
Tamil Nadu Dragons	Chennai, Tamil Nadu	Charles Group	Yes	No
HIL Governing Council	—N/a	—N/a	Yes	No
Total			8	4

== Venues ==
The matches were held across three cities, Bhubaneswar, Chennai and Ranchi. While women's games were hosted at the Jaipal Singh Stadium in Ranchi, the men's games were held at the Kalinga Stadium in Bhubaneswar, at the Mayor Radhakrishnan Hockey Stadium in Chennai and at the Jaipal Singh Stadium in Ranchi.

Locations of the HIL

Bhubaneswar	Chennai	Ranchi
Kalinga Stadium	Mayor Radhakrishnan Hockey Stadium	Jaipal Singh Stadium
Capacity: 16,000	Capacity: 8,670	Capacity: 5,000
		2025–26 Hockey India League is located in Jharkhand

== Men's HIL ==
=== Standings ===
Pos	Team	Pld	W	SOW	SOL	L	GF	GA	GD	Pts	Qualification
1	Kalinga Lancers (H)	7	4	2	0	1	16	8	+8	16	Qualified to Knockouts
2	Ranchi Royals (H)	7	3	1	1	2	25	18	+7	12	Qualified to Knockouts
3	Hyderabad Toofans	7	3	0	2	2	17	11	+6	11	Qualified to Knockouts
4	HIL Governing Council	7	3	0	2	2	21	18	+3	11	Qualified to Knockouts
5	Soorma Hockey Club	7	3	1	0	3	16	14	+2	11	
6	Tamil Nadu Dragons (H)	7	1	3	1	2	19	22	−3	10	
7	Rarh Bengal Tigers	7	3	0	0	4	16	24	−8	9	
8	SG Pipers	7	1	0	1	5	14	29	−15	4	

Source: Hockey India
Rules for classification: 1) Points: Win (3) Draw (1) Shoot-out win (1); 2) matches won; 3) goal difference; 4) goals scored; 5) head-to-head points, goal difference & goals scored; 6) shoot‐out competition
(H) Host

=== League stage ===
3 January 2026
19:30 UTC+5:30

Tamil Nadu Dragons	3–3	Hyderabad Toofans
Uttam 4'; Sorsby 9'; Karthi 32'	Report	12', 18' Amandeep; 37' De Sloover
Penalties
Ephraums (penalty shoot-out scored); Govers (penalty shoot-out scored); Uttam (penalty shoot-out scored); Craig (penalty shoot-out missed); Raheel (penalty shoot-out scored)	4–2	(penalty shoot-out scored) Arshdeep; (penalty shoot-out missed) Struthoff; (penalty shoot-out scored) Wallace; (penalty shoot-out missed) Talwinder

Mayor Radhakrishnan Hockey Stadium, Chennai
Umpires:
David Tomlinson (NZL)
Raghu Prasad (IND)

4 January 2026
17:00 UTC+5:30

Soorma Hockey Club	1–3	Rarh Bengal Tigers
Prabhjot 54'	Report	33' Sukhjeet; 45' Abhishek; 60' Gursewak

Mayor Radhakrishnan Hockey Stadium, Chennai
Umpires:
Coen van Bunge (NED)
Napoleon Chanamthabam (IND)

4 January 2026
19:30 UTC+5:30

Kalinga Lancers	4–2	Ranchi Royals
Hendrickx 7', 28'; Gursahibjit 16', 26'	Report	1' Boon; 9' Mandeep

Mayor Radhakrishnan Hockey Stadium, Chennai
Umpires:
Zeke Newman (AUS)
Balaji Kumar (IND)

5 January 2026
19:30 UTC+5:30

Delhi SG Pipers	2–3	HIL Governing Council
Willott 31'; Dilraj 56'	Report	35', 37', 60' Russell

Mayor Radhakrishnan Hockey Stadium, Chennai
Umpires:
Deepak Joshi (IND)
Anand Dangi (IND)

6 January 2026
19:30 UTC+5:30

Tamil Nadu Dragons	3–2	Soorma Hockey Club
Selvaraj 28'; Uttam 30'; Govers 47'	Report	45' Maninder; 58' Harmanpreet

Mayor Radhakrishnan Hockey Stadium, Chennai
Umpires:
Gurbaj Singh (IND)
Sourabh Rajput (IND)

7 January 2026
17:00 UTC+5:30

HIL Governing Council	6–3	Rarh Bengal Tigers
Ward 19'; Russell 19', 36', 44'; Sudeep 38'; Albery 59'	Report	12' Jugraj; 40'T. Grambusch; 40' Rühr

Mayor Radhakrishnan Hockey Stadium, Chennai
Umpires:
Balaji Kumar (IND)
David Tomlinson (NZL)

7 January 2026
19:30 UTC+5:30

Hyderabad Toofans	3–2	Ranchi Royals
Amandeep 42'; Woods 45'; Talwinder 57'	Report	11', 17' Boon

Mayor Radhakrishnan Hockey Stadium, Chennai
Umpires:
Coen van Bunge (NED)
Zeke Newman (AUS)

8 January 2026
19:30 UTC+5:30

Rarh Bengal Tigers	1–2	Kalinga Lancers
Affan 56'	Report	52' Hendrickx; 57' Boby

Mayor Radhakrishnan Hockey Stadium, Chennai
Umpires:
Napoleon Chanamthabam (IND)
Raghu Prasad (IND)

9 January 2026
17:00 UTC+5:30

Hyderabad Toofans	1–1	Soorma Hockey Club
Amandeep 46'	Report	20' Harmanpreet
Penalties
Brand (penalty shoot-out scored); Wallace (penalty shoot-out missed); Arshdeep (penalty shoot-out missed); Rajinder (penalty shoot-out missed)	1–3	(penalty shoot-out scored) Harmanpreet; (penalty shoot-out scored) Keenan; (penalty shoot-out missed) Gurjant; (penalty shoot-out missed) Wegnez; (penalty shoot-out scored) Della Torre

Mayor Radhakrishnan Hockey Stadium, Chennai
Umpires:
Anand Dangi (IND)
Zeke Newman (AUS)

9 January 2026
19:30 UTC+5:30

Tamil Nadu Dragons	4–4	Delhi SG Pipers
Amit 9'; Kaufmann 17'; Craig 18'; Selvaraj 40'	Report	13', 18' Domene; 38' Willott; 59' Aditya
Penalties
Ephraums (penalty shoot-out scored); Govers (penalty shoot-out scored); Uttam (penalty shoot-out scored); Craig (penalty shoot-out scored); Raheel (penalty shoot-out scored)	5–4	(penalty shoot-out scored) Rajkumar; (penalty shoot-out scored) Domene; (penalty shoot-out missed) Duvekot; (penalty shoot-out scored) Willott; (penalty shoot-out scored) Ankit

Mayor Radhakrishnan Hockey Stadium, Chennai
Umpires:
Sourabh Rajput (IND)
Deepak Joshi (IND)

11 January 2026
17:00 UTC+5:30

HIL Governing Council	1–1	Kalinga Lancers
Ajeet 19'	Report	23' Hendrickx
Penalties
Gurjot (penalty shoot-out scored); Yorston (penalty shoot-out missed); Lalit (penalty shoot-out missed); Ajeet (penalty shoot-out missed)	1–3	(penalty shoot-out scored) Burns; (penalty shoot-out missed) Kina; (penalty shoot-out missed) Angad; (penalty shoot-out scored) Van Doren; (penalty shoot-out scored) Dilpreet

Jaipal Singh Stadium, Ranchi
Umpires:
Gurbaj Singh (IND)
David Tomlinson (NZL)

11 January 2026
19:30 UTC+5:30

Ranchi Royals	4–1	Rarh Bengal Tigers
Boon 54', 60'; Mandeep 56'; Sharp 58'	Report	26' Ketan

Jaipal Singh Stadium, Ranchi
Umpires:
Zeke Newman (AUS)
Deepak Joshi (IND)

12 January 2026
17:00 UTC+5:30

Delhi SG Pipers	2–1	Hyderabad Toofans
Domene 8', 29'	Report	41' Amandeep

Jaipal Singh Stadium, Ranchi
Umpires:
Coen van Bunge (NED)
Raghu Prasad (IND)

12 January 2026
19:30 UTC+5:30

HIL Governing Council	4–2	Tamil Nadu Dragons
Russell 14', 33', 47'; Ward 23'	Report	32' Govers; 56' Uttam

Jaipal Singh Stadium, Ranchi
Umpires:
David Tomlinson (NZL)
Sourabh Rajput (IND)

13 January 2026
19:30 UTC+5:30

Rarh Bengal Tigers	5–3	Tamil Nadu Dragons
Jugraj 11', 43', 45'; Sukhjeet 33'; Abhishek 55'	Report	36' Adrohit; 48' Sorsby; 51' Govers

Jaipal Singh Stadium, Ranchi
Umpires:
Zeke Newman (AUS)
Anand Dangi (IND)

14 January 2026
17:00 UTC+5:30

Hyderabad Toofans	0–1	Kalinga Lancers
	Report	40' Hendrickx

Jaipal Singh Stadium, Ranchi
Umpires:
Coen van Bunge (NED)
Mohit Rawat (IND)

14 January 2026
19:30 UTC+5:30

Ranchi Royals	6–2	Delhi SG Pipers
Mandeep 13'; Boon 17', 40', 41', 50', 60'	Report	20' Domene; 39' Furlong

Jaipal Singh Stadium, Ranchi
Umpires:
Zeke Newman (AUS)
Gurbaj Singh (IND)

15 January 2026
19:30 UTC+5:30

Soorma Hockey Club	3–1	HIL Governing Council
Harmanpreet 15', 38'; Gurjant 27'	Report	47' Russell

Jaipal Singh Stadium, Ranchi
Umpires:
Raghu Prasad (IND)
Mohit Rawat (IND)

16 January 2026
19:30 UTC+5:30

Ranchi Royals	4–1	Soorma Hockey Club
Manmeet 14'; Boon 20', 22'; Mandeep 47'	Report	14' Jeetpal

Jaipal Singh Stadium, Ranchi
Umpires:
David Tomlinson (NZL)
Gurbaj Singh (IND)

17 January 2026
17:00 UTC+5:30

Rarh Bengal Tigers	0–6	Hyderabad Toofans
	Report	Wallace 2', 17', 30'; Brand 12', 39', 46'

Kalinga Stadium, Bhubaneswar
Umpires:
Coen van Bunge (NED)
Anand Dangi (IND)

17 January 2026
19:30 UTC+5:30

Kalinga Lancers	6–1	Delhi SG Pipers
Burns 8', 23'; Marais 10'; Hendrickx 39', 56'; Angad 54'	Report	11' Willott

Kalinga Stadium, Bhubaneswar
Umpires:
Zeke Newman (AUS)
Napoleon Chanamthabam (IND)

18 January 2026
17:00 UTC+5:30

Delhi SG Pipers	2–3	Rarh Bengal Tigers
Dilraj 5'; Domene 31'	Report	45' Jugraj; 45' Abhishek; 48' Affan

Kalinga Stadium, Bhubaneswar
Umpires:
David Tomlinson (NZL)
Deekshith (IND)

18 January 2026
19:30 UTC+5:30

Kalinga Lancers	1–1	Tamil Nadu Dragons
Hendrickx 44'	Report	19' Govers
Penalties
Burns (penalty shoot-out scored); Angad (penalty shoot-out scored); Kina (penalty shoot-out scored); Van Doren (penalty shoot-out scored)	4–1	(penalty shoot-out missed) Ephraums; (penalty shoot-out missed) Govers; (penalty shoot-out scored) Uttam

Kalinga Stadium, Bhubaneswar
Umpires:
Zeke Newman (AUS)
Sourabh Rajput (IND)

19 January 2026
19:30 UTC+5:30

HIL Governing Council	4–4	Ranchi Royals
Upadhyay 25', 53'; Russell 36'; Sudeep 39'	Report	19', 32' Hundal; 40' Lane; 57' Boon
Penalties
Gurjot (penalty shoot-out missed); Ajeet (penalty shoot-out scored); Walsh (penalty shoot-out missed)	1–4	(penalty shoot-out scored) Vishnukant; (penalty shoot-out scored) Lane; (penalty shoot-out scored) Van Oost; (penalty shoot-out scored) Boon

Kalinga Stadium, Bhubaneswar
Umpires:
Raghu Prasad (IND)
Coen van Bunge (NED)

20 January 2026
17:00 UTC+5:30

Hyderabad Toofans	3–2	HIL Governing Council
Wallace 6'; Amandeep 8'; Shilanand 27'	Report	8', 31' Russell

Kalinga Stadium, Bhubaneswar
Umpires:
Coen van Bunge (NED)
David Tomlinson (NZL)

20 January 2026
19:30 UTC+5:30

Kalinga Lancers	1–2	Soorma Hockey Club
Henderson 48'	Report	23' Jeetpal; 38' Vivek

Kalinga Stadium, Bhubaneswar
Umpires:
Sourabh Rajput (IND)
Raghu Prasad (IND)

21 January 2026
19:30 UTC+5:30

Tamil Nadu Dragons	3–3	Ranchi Royals
Govers 24', 53'; Karthi 32'	Report	1' Mandeep; 9', 35' Boon
Penalties
Ephraums (penalty shoot-out scored); Govers (penalty shoot-out scored); Uttam (penalty shoot-out scored); Craig (penalty shoot-out scored)	4–2	(penalty shoot-out missed) Vishnukant; (penalty shoot-out scored) Yashdeep; (penalty shoot-out missed) Manpreet; (penalty shoot-out scored) Van Oost

Kalinga Stadium, Bhubaneswar
Umpires:
Zeke Newman (AUS)
Deekshith (IND)

22 January 2026
19:30 UTC+5:30

Soorma Hockey Club	6–1	Delhi SG Pipers
Hayward 2', 7', 34', 45'; Martínez 11'; Keenan 47'	Report	43' Domene

Kalinga Stadium, Bhubaneswar
Umpires:
Coen van Bunge (NED)
Deepak Joshi (IND)

=== Knockouts ===
Qualifier 1
1	Kalinga Lancers	2
2	Ranchi Royals	1
Eliminator
3	Hyderabad Toofans	2
4	HIL Governing Council	0

Qualifier 2
Q1L	Ranchi Royals	3
EW	Hyderabad Toofans	2

Final
Q1W	Kalinga Lancers	3
Q2W	Ranchi Royals	2
Third place
Q2L	Hyderabad Toofans	4
EL	HIL Governing Council	3

==== Qualifier 1 ====
23 January 2026
19:30 UTC+5:30

Kalinga Lancers	2–1	Ranchi Royals
Hendrickx 12', 32'	Report	40' Mandeep

Kalinga Stadium, Bhubaneswar
Umpires:
Zeke Newman (AUS)
Sourabh Rajput (IND)

==== Eliminator ====
23 January 2026
17:00 UTC+5:30

Hyderabad Toofans	2–0	HIL Governing Council
Shilanand 16', 39'	Report

Kalinga Stadium, Bhubaneswar
Umpires:
David Tomlinson (NZL)
Coen van Bunge (NED)

==== Qualifier 2 ====
25 January 2026
19:30 UTC+5:30

Ranchi Royals	3–2	Hyderabad Toofans
Boon 13', 15', 34'	Report	5' Anderson; 38' Amandeep

Kalinga Stadium, Bhubaneswar
Umpires:
Coen van Bunge (NED)
Raghu Prasad (IND)

==== Third and fourth place ====
26 January 2026
17:00 UTC+5:30

HIL Governing Council	3–4	Hyderabad Toofans
Ward 14', 52'; Kane Russell 55'	Report	24' Nilakanta; 30', 53' Amandeep; 33' Anderson

Kalinga Stadium, Bhubaneswar
Umpires:
Sourabh Rajput (IND)
Deepak Joshi (IND)

==== Final ====
26 January 2026
19:30 UTC+5:30

Kalinga Lancers	3–2	Ranchi Royals
Hendrickx 4', 27'; Dilpreet 25'	Report	9' Hundal; 59' Boon

Kalinga Stadium, Bhubaneswar
Umpires:
Coen van Bunge (NED)
Zeke Newman (AUS)

== Women's HIL ==
=== Standings ===
Pos	Team	Pld	W	SOW	SOL	L	GF	GA	GD	Pts	
1	SG Pipers	6	3	0	2	1	11	9	+2	11	Qualified to Final
2	Rarh Bengal Tigers	6	2	2	0	2	7	11	−4	10	Qualified to Final
3	Ranchi Royals (H)	6	3	0	0	3	13	7	+6	9	
4	Soorma Hockey Club	6	2	0	0	4	6	10	−4	6	

Source: Hockey India
Rules for classification: 1) Points: Win (3) Draw (1) Shoot-out win (1); 2) matches won; 3) goal difference; 4) goals scored; 5) head-to-head points, goal difference & goals scored; 6) shoot‐out competition
(H) Host

=== League stage ===
28 December 2025
19:30 UTC+5:30

Ranchi Royals	0–2	Delhi SG Pipers
	Report	Navneet 27'; Viana 46'

Jaipal Singh Stadium, Ranchi
Umpires:
Rachel Williams (ENG)
Ruchika Wankhede (IND)

29 December 2025
19:30 UTC+5:30

Soorma Hockey Club	0–1	Rarh Bengal Tigers
	Report	Gorzelany 11'

Jaipal Singh Stadium, Ranchi
Umpires:
Kelly Hudson (NZL)
Durga Devi (IND)

30 December 2025
19:30 UTC+5:30

Ranchi Royals	5–0	Rarh Bengal Tigers
Cotter 10'; Beauty 14'; Von der Heyde 33', 57'; Sangita 44'	Report

Jaipal Singh Stadium, Ranchi
Umpires:
Rachel Williams (ENG)
Deepa (IND)

31 December 2025
19:30 UTC+5:30

Delhi SG Pipers	1–0	Soorma Hockey Club
Navneet 4'	Report

Jaipal Singh Stadium, Ranchi
Umpires:
Rama Potnis (IND)
Ruchika Wankhede (IND)

1 January 2026
19:30 UTC+5:30

Delhi SG Pipers	3–3	Rarh Bengal Tigers
Riera 10', 60'; Sunelita 59'	Report	Gorzelany 6', 18'; Lalremsiami 11'
Penalties
Navneet (penalty shoot-out missed); Ishika (penalty shoot-out scored); Sunelita (penalty shoot-out scored); Jardel (penalty shoot-out missed); Castellaro (penalty shoot-out scored); Ishika (penalty shoot-out missed); Sunelita (penalty shoot-out missed)	3–4	(penalty shoot-out scored) Purnima; (penalty shoot-out missed) Lalremsiami; (penalty shoot-out scored) Manuele; (penalty shoot-out scored) De Baat; (penalty shoot-out missed) Raposo; (penalty shoot-out missed) Purnima; (penalty shoot-out scored) Lalremsiami

Jaipal Singh Stadium, Ranchi
Umpires:
Kelly Hudson (NZL)
Shivani Sharma (IND)

2 January 2026
19:30 UTC+5:30

Ranchi Royals	2–0	Soorma Hockey Club
Rutuja 30'; Sakshi 54'	Report

Jaipal Singh Stadium, Ranchi
Umpires:
Rachel Williams (ENG)
Rama Potnis (IND)

3 January 2026
17:00 UTC+5:30

Soorma Hockey Club	1–3	Delhi SG Pipers
Squibb 12'	Report	Riera 13'; Jyoti S. 18'; Sunelita 58'

Jaipal Singh Stadium, Ranchi
Umpires:
Kelly Hudson (NZL)
Deepa (IND)

4 January 2026
15:00 UTC+5:30

Rarh Bengal Tigers	1–0	Ranchi Royals
Gorzelany 37'	Report

Jaipal Singh Stadium, Ranchi
Umpires:
Rachel Williams (ENG)
Durga Devi (IND)

5 January 2026
17:00 UTC+5:30

Soorma Hockey Club	2–1	Ranchi Royals
Squibb 1'; Shannon 39'	Report	Alonso 35'

Jaipal Singh Stadium, Ranchi
Umpires:
Rama Potnis (IND)
Shivani Sharma (IND)

6 January 2026
17:00 UTC+5:30

Rarh Bengal Tigers	0–0	Delhi SG Pipers
	Report
Penalties
Purnima (penalty shoot-out scored); Lalremsiami (penalty shoot-out missed); Manuele (penalty shoot-out missed); De Baat (penalty shoot-out scored); Sukhveer (penalty shoot-out missed); De Baat (penalty shoot-out scored); Purnima (penalty shoot-out scored); Lalremsiami (penalty shoot-out scored); Manuele (penalty shoot-out scored); Sukhveer (penalty shoot-out scored)	7–6	(penalty shoot-out missed) Navneet; (penalty shoot-out scored) Castellaro; (penalty shoot-out missed) Ishika; (penalty shoot-out scored) Nobbs; (penalty shoot-out missed) Viana; (penalty shoot-out scored) Navneet; (penalty shoot-out scored) Nobbs; (penalty shoot-out scored) Castellaro; (penalty shoot-out scored) Viana; (penalty shoot-out missed) Ishika

Jaipal Singh Stadium, Ranchi
Umpires:
Rachel Williams (ENG)
Neetu Kumari (IND)

7 January 2026
15:00 UTC+5:30

Rarh Bengal Tigers	2–3	Soorma Hockey Club
Gorzelany 37'; Lalremsiami 60'	Report	Sonam 10'; Squibb 50'; Granatto 53'

Jaipal Singh Stadium, Ranchi
Umpires:
Deepa (IND)
Shivani Sharma (IND)

8 January 2026
17:00 UTC+5:30

Delhi SG Pipers	2–5	Ranchi Royals
Navneet 10', 58'	Report	Von der Heyde 2', 47'; Sangita 24'; Cotter 55', 60'

Jaipal Singh Stadium, Ranchi
Umpires:
Kelly Hudson (NZL)
Neetu Kumari (IND)

=== Women's Final ===
10 January 2026
19:30 UTC+5:30

Delhi SG Pipers	1–1	Rarh Bengal Tigers
Preeti D. 53'	Report	Lalremsiami 16'
Penalties
Navneet (penalty shoot-out scored); Ishika (penalty shoot-out missed); Castellaro (penalty shoot-out scored); Sunelita (penalty shoot-out missed); Nobbs (penalty shoot-out scored)	3–2	(penalty shoot-out missed) Purnima; (penalty shoot-out scored) Lalremsiami; (penalty shoot-out missed) De Baat; (penalty shoot-out missed) Manuele; (penalty shoot-out scored) Sukhveer

Jaipal Singh Stadium, Ranchi
Umpires:
Rachel Williams (ENG)
Kelly Hudson (NZL)

== Top goalscorers ==
As of 26 January 2026

=== Men's HIL ===
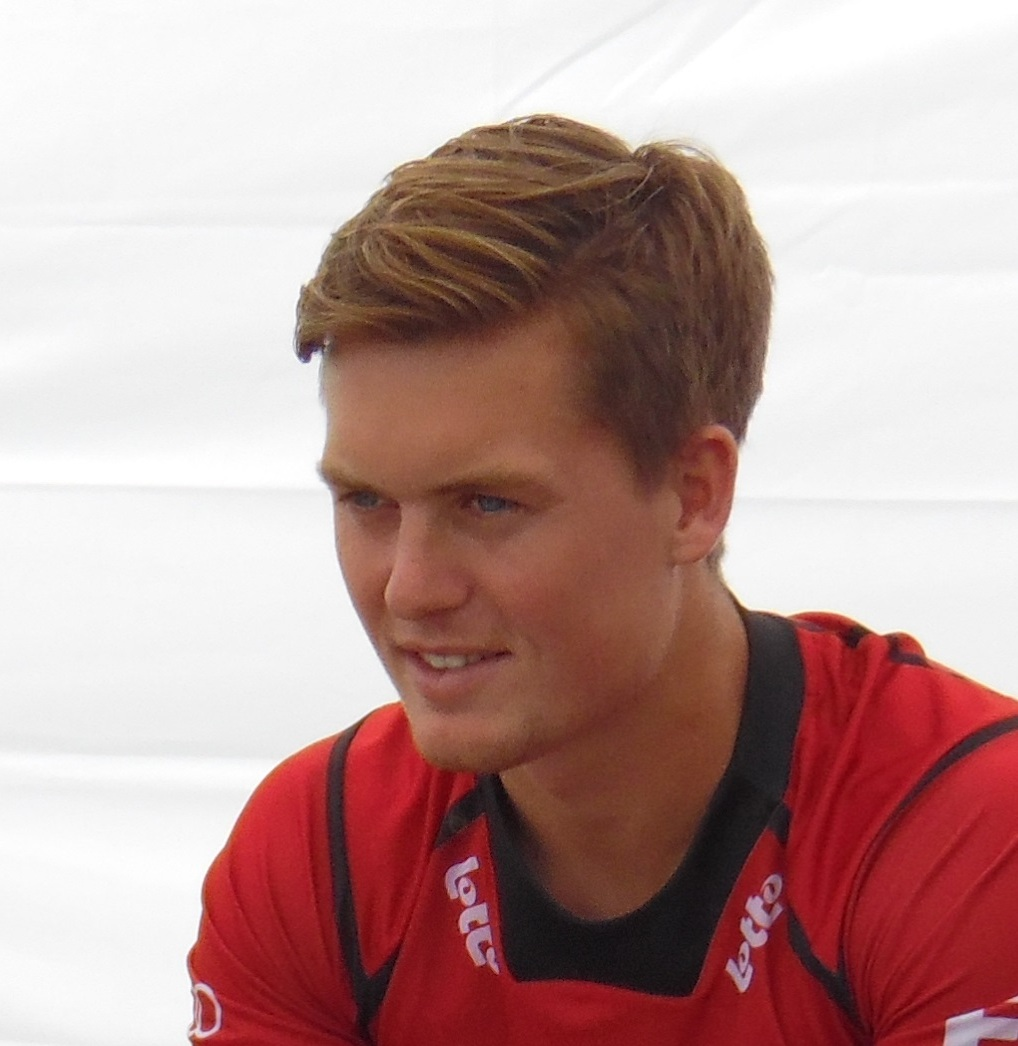
Tom Boon, the highest goalscorer of the 2025–26 Men's HIL season.

Rank	Player	Team	Goals
1	(Belgium) Tom Boon	Ranchi Royals	19
2	(New Zealand) Kane Russell	HIL Governing Council	14
3	(Belgium) Alexander Hendrickx	Kalinga Lancers	12
4	(India) Amandeep Lakra	Hyderabad Toofans	9
4	(Argentina) Tomás Domene	Delhi SG Pipers	9
5	(Australia) Blake Govers	Tamil Nadu Dragons	6
5	(India) Mandeep Singh	Ranchi Royals	6
6	(India) Jugraj Singh	Rarh Bengal Tigers	5
7	(India) Harmanpreet Singh	Soorma Hockey Club	4
7	(Australia) Jeremy Hayward	Soorma Hockey Club	4
7	(England) Samuel Ward	HIL Governing Council	4
7	(England) Zachary Wallace	Hyderabad Toofans	4
8	(India) Abhishek Nain	Rarh Bengal Tigers	3
8	(India) Araijeet Singh Hundal	Ranchi Royals	3
8	(Australia) Ky Willott	Delhi SG Pipers	3
8	(Australia) Tim Brand	Hyderabad Toofans	3
8	(India) Uttam Singh	Tamil Nadu Dragons	3
9	(India) Affan Yousuf	Rarh Bengal Tigers	2
9	(Australia) Cooper Burns	Kalinga Lancers	2
9	(India) Dilraj Singh	Delhi SG Pipers	2
9	(India) Gursahibjit Singh	Kalinga Lancers	2
9	(Australia) Jacob Anderson	Hyderabad Toofans	2
9	(India) Jeetpal	Soorma Hockey Club	2
9	(India) Karthi Selvam	Tamil Nadu Dragons	2
9	(India) Lalit Upadhyay	HIL Governing Council	2
9	(India) Selvaraj Kanagaraj	Tamil Nadu Dragons	2
9	(India) Sudeep Chirmako	HIL Governing Council	2
9	(India) Shilanand Lakra	Hyderabad Toofans	2
9	(India) Sukhjeet Singh	Rarh Bengal Tigers	2
9	(England) Tom Sorsby	Tamil Nadu Dragons	2
10	(India) Aditya Lalage	Delhi SG Pipers	1
10	(India) Adrohit Ekka	Tamil Nadu Dragons	1
10	(India) Ajeet Yadav	HIL Governing Council	1
10	(India) Amit Rohidas	Tamil Nadu Dragons	1
10	(India) Angad Bir Singh	Kalinga Lancers	1
10	(Belgium) Arthur De Sloover	Hyderabad Toofans	1
10	(India) Boby Singh Dhami	Kalinga Lancers	1
10	(Germany) Christopher Rühr	Rarh Bengal Tigers	1
10	(Australia) Craig Marais	Kalinga Lancers	1
10	(India) Dilpreet	Kalinga Lancers	1
10	(Wales) Gareth Furlong	Delhi SG Pipers	1
10	(India) Gurjant Singh	Soorma Hockey Club	1
10	(India) Gursewak SIngh	Rarh Bengal Tigers	1
10	(England) James Albery	HIL Governing Council	1
10	(India) Ketan Kushwaha	Rarh Bengal Tigers	1
10	(Australia) Lachlan Sharp	Ranchi Royals	1
10	(Australia) Liam Henderson	Kalinga Lancers	1
10	(Argentina) Lucas Martínez	Soorma Hockey Club	1
10	(India) Maninder Singh	Soorma Hockey Club	1
10	(India) Manmeet Singh Rai	Ranchi Royals	1
10	(New Zealand) Nic Woods	Hyderabad Toofans	1
10	(Argentina) Nicolás Keenan	Soorma Hockey Club	1
10	(India) Nilakanta Sharma	Hyderabad Toofans	1
10	(Germany) Paul-Philipp Kaufmann	Tamil Nadu Dragons	1
10	(India) Prabhjot Singh	Soorma Hockey Club	1
10	(New Zealand) Sam Lane	Ranchi Royals	1
10	(India) Talwinder Singh	Hyderabad Toofans	1
10	(Australia) Tom Craig	Tamil Nadu Dragons	1
10	(Germany) Tom Grambusch	Rarh Bengal Tigers	1
10	(India) Vivek Prasad	Soorma Hockey Club	1

=== Women's HIL ===
Rank	Player	Team	Goals
1	(Argentina) Agustina Gorzelany	Rarh Bengal Tigers	5
2	(India) Navneet Kaur	Delhi SG Pipers	4
2	(Argentina) Lucina von der Heyde	Ranchi Royals	4
3	(New Zealand) Hannah Cotter	Ranchi Royals	3
3	(India) Lalremsiami Hmarzote	Rarh Bengal Tigers	3
3	(Spain) Lola Riera	Delhi SG Pipers	3
3	(Australia) Penny Squibb	Soorma Hockey Club	3
4	(India) Sangita Kumari	Ranchi Royals	2
4	(India) Sunelita Toppo	Delhi SG Pipers	2
5	(Argentina) Agostina Alonso	Ranchi Royals	1
5	(India) Beauty Dungdung	Ranchi Royals	1
5	(India) Jyoti Singh	Delhi SG Pipers	1
5	(Argentina) María José Granatto	Soorma Hockey Club	1
5	(New Zealand) Olivia Shannon	Soorma Hockey Club	1
5	(India) Preeti Dubey	Delhi SG Pipers	1
5	(India) Rutuja Pisal	Ranchi Royals	1
5	(India) Sakshi Rana	Ranchi Royals	1
5	(India) Sonam	Soorma Hockey Club	1
5	(Uruguay) Teresa Viana	Delhi SG Pipers	1
