= Odisha Warriors =

Field hockey franchise team

- Full name: Odisha Warriors
- League: Hockey India League
- Founded: 2024
- Dissolved: 2025
- Colors
- Home ground: Birsa Munda International Hockey Stadium, Rourkela, Odisha (Capacity 21,800)

Personnel
- Captain: (India) Neha Goyal
- Coach: (Netherlands) Janneke Schopman
- Owner: Navoyam Sports Ventures
- Chairman: Sanjeev Srivastava

Performance
- Winners: 2024–25
Home	Away

Odisha Warriors (Odia: ଓଡ଼ିଶା ୱାରିୟର୍ସ) was a professional field hockey franchise based in Rourkela, Odisha. Owned by Navoyam Sports Ventures, the franchise competed in the Hockey India League. The team clinched the inaugural edition, but was subsequently disbanded owing to financial constraints.

== Ownership ==
On 4 October 2024, Hockey India announced the introduction of a standalone women's Hockey India League, which will run concurrently with the men's competition. On the same day, Hockey India also revealed the men's and women's franchises. The press event revealed the Odisha Warriors franchise, owned by Navoyam Sports Ventures, as one of the four teams to compete in the inaugural season of the League.

== Stadium ==
Established in January 2023, the Birsa Munda International Hockey Stadium in Rourkela, is the home ground of the Odisha Warriors. The 21,800-capacity stadium has hosted several national and international tournaments including the Men's FIH Hockey World Cup, Men's FIH Pro League and Women's FIH Pro League. The stadium also serves as the home base for the men's national field hockey team, women's national field hockey team and youth national teams.

== Squad ==
As of 23 January 2025

No.	Player	Nationality	Salary
Goalkeepers
19	Jocelyn Bartram	Australia	₹15 lakh (US$16,000)
24	Engil Harsha Rani Minz	India	₹2 lakh (US$2,100)
25	Madhuri Kindo	India	₹3.4 lakh (US$3,500)
Defenders
1	Jyoti Chhatri	India	₹5 lakh (US$5,200)
3	Deep Grace Ekka	India	₹10 lakh (US$10,000)
4	Claire Colwill	Australia	₹13 lakh (US$13,000)
14	Anjali Barwa	India	₹2 lakh (US$2,100)
21	Kaitlin Nobbs	Australia	₹10 lakh (US$10,000)
50	Ishika Chaudhary	India	₹16 lakh (US$17,000)
Midfielders
5	Sonika Tandi	India	₹5.4 lakh (US$5,600)
7	Neha Goyal (C)	India	₹10 lakh (US$10,000)
8	Yibbi Jansen	Netherlands	₹29 lakh (US$30,000)
12	Nisha Warsi	India	₹2.6 lakh (US$2,700)
16	Victoria Sauze	Argentina	₹6.8 lakh (US$7,100)
18	Lilly Stoffelsma	Germany	₹7 lakh (US$7,300)
22	Baljeet Kaur	India	₹10 lakh (US$10,000)
Forwards
2	Galuja Nandini	India	₹5 lakh (US$5,200)
6	Annu	India	₹10 lakh (US$10,000)
9	Sadhna Sengar	India	₹2.1 lakh (US$2,200)
13	Kanika Siwach	India	₹3.1 lakh (US$3,200)
15	Freeke Moes	Netherlands	₹10 lakh (US$10,000)
20	Michelle Fillet	Netherlands	₹6.8 lakh (US$7,100)
23	Sakshi Rana	India	₹7 lakh (US$7,300)
45	Rutuja Pisal	India	₹4.9 lakh (US$5,100)

== Personnel ==
=== Technical staff ===
As of 28 December 2024

Position	Name	Ref.
Head coach	(Netherlands) Janneke Schopman	
Assistant Coach	(Northern Ireland) David Williamson	
Assistant Coach	(India) Lilima Minz	
Stand-In Manager	(India) Lilima Minz	
Team Manager	(India) Vandana Uikey	
Physiotherapist	(India) Rakhi Darne	
Physical Trainer	(India) Priya Yadav	

=== Coaching history ===
Name	Nationality	Period
Janneke Schopman	Netherlands	2025–

== Statistics ==
As of 26 January 2025

=== Overall ===
Edition	Matches	Won	Draw	Lost	Shootout		GF	GA	Win%
Edition	Matches	Won	Draw	Lost	W	L	GF	GA	Win%
2025	7	3	3	1	2	2	13	6	42.85%

=== Performance by opposition ===
Opposition	Matches	Won	Lost	Shootout		GF	GA
Opposition	Matches	Won	Lost	W	L	GF	GA
Delhi SG Pipers	2	1	0	0	1	5	1
Rarh Bengal Tigers	2	1	0	1	0	5	2
Soorma Hockey Club	3	1	1	1	0	3	3

=== Top goalscorers ===
Rank	Player	Nationality	Goals
1	Yibbi Jansen	Netherlands	5
2	Baljeet Kaur	India	2
2	Freeke Moes	Netherlands	2
2	Rutuja Pisal	India	2
3	Michelle Fillet	Netherlands	1
3	Neha Goyal	India	1

== See also ==
- Kalinga Lancers
- Hockey Association of Odisha
