= Hyderabad Toofans =

Hyderabad based field hockey franchise team

- Full name: Hyderabad Toofans
- League: Hockey India League
- Founded: 2024
- Colors
- Home ground: Hyderabad

Personnel
- Captain: (India) Sumit Walmiki
- Coach: Head; (Netherlands) Pasha Gademan; Assistant; (Belgium) Emily Calderon; (India) Sanjay Bir
- Mentor: (India) Siddharth Pandey
- Owner: Resolute Sports
- CEO: Sai Prakash
- Chairman: Alok Sanghi
- Website: Website

Performance
- Runners-up: 2024–25
Home	Away

Hyderabad Toofans is a field hockey franchise team based in Hyderabad that competes in the Hockey India League. It is owned by Resolute Sports.

Dutch field hockey player Pasha Gademan is the coach of the team. Emily Calderon and Sanjay Bir are the assistant coaches while Siddharth Pandey is the team director.

== Ownership ==
Hyderabad Toofans is owned by Alok Sanghi of Resolute Sports.

== Squad ==
=== 2024–25 ===
Player	Nationality
Goalkeepers
Bikramjit Singh	India
Dominic Dixon	New Zealand
Vikas Dahiya	India
Defenders
Akshay Avhad	India
Amandeep Lakra	India
Devindar Walmiki	India
Arthur De Sloover	Belgium
Gonzalo Peillat	Germany
Nic Woods	New Zealand
Mukul Sharma	India
Sundaram Rajawat	India
Midfielders
Darshan Gavkar	India
Nilakanta Sharma	India
Maico Casella	Argentina
Aakib Rahim	India
Rajinder Singh	India
Zachary Wallace	United Kingdom
Sumit Walmiki (C)	India
Forwards
Arshdeep Singh	India
Talwinder Singh	India
Jacob Anderson	Australia
Tim Brand	Australia
Shilanand Lakra	India
Rohit Irengbam	India

=== 2026 ===
Player	Nationality
Goalkeepers
Bikramjit Singh	India
Jeaan Danneberg	Germany
Defenders
Amandeep Lakra	India
Devindar Walmiki	India
Arthur De Sloover	Belgium
Gonzalo Peillat	Germany
Mukul Sharma	India
Sundaram Rajawat	India
Sumit Walmiki (C)	India
Midfielders
Nilakanta Sharma	India
Aakib Rahim	India
Rajinder Singh	India
Zachary Wallace	United Kingdom
Nic Woods	New Zealand
Forwards
Arshdeep Singh	India
Talwinder Singh	India
Jacob Anderson	Australia
Tim Brand	Australia
Shilanand Lakra	India
Rohit Irengbam	India

== Performance record ==
Season	Standing	Result	Matches	Won	Draw	Lost	Shootout	
Season	Standing	Result	Matches	Won	Draw	Lost	W	L
2024–25	3/8	Runners Up	12	5	4	3	2	2
2026		Third place						

== Goalscorers ==
Rank	Player	Nationality	Goals
1	Gonzalo Peillat	Argentina	5
2	Tim Brand	Australia	4
3	Amandeep Lakra	India	2
3	Arthur De Sloover	Belgium	2
4	Zachary Wallace	United Kingdom	1
4	Rajinder Singh	India	1
4	Shilanand Lakra	India	1
4	Maico Casella	Argentina	1
4	Arshdeep Singh	India	1
