= Talem Priyobarta =

Indian field hockey player

Personal information
- Born: 2 September 2004 (age 22) Manipur, India

Sport
- Sport: Field hockey
- Position: Defender
Senior career
Years	Team	Caps	Goals
2018–	Hockey Manipur	13	3
2019–	Madhya Pradesh Hockey Academy	17	5
2026–	HIL GC	9	-
2024–2025	UP Rudras	10	-
National team
Years	Team	Caps	Goals
2024–2025	India U21	24	(3)
2026–	India		-
Medal record
Men's field hockey
Representing India
Junior World Cup
Bronze medal – third place	2025 Tamilnadu
Junior Asia Cup
Gold medal – first place	2024 Muscat

Talem Priyobarta (born 2 September 2004) is an Indian field hockey player from Manipur who represented the national junior hockey team as a defender.

== Early life ==
Talem Priyobarta, son of T Mani and T Bala, hails from Manipur. He was part of the Posterior Hockey Academy Manipur (PHAM) in his early days.

== Career ==
Talem Priyobarta represented Indian junior team in the Europe tour in 2024 and also part of the team that competed in the 2024 Sultan of Johor Cup. He scored a last minute equaliser through a penalty corner against New Zealand to draw the match 3–3. Following his team's victory at the 2024 Junior Asia Cup, he was selected by the UP Rudras in the 2024–25 Hockey India League. He also competed in the 2025 Sultan of Johor Cup and part of the bronze medal-winning team at the 2025 Junior World Cup.

In 2026, he represented Indian senior team in the India–New Zealand Centenary hockey series.
