= Tamil Nadu Dragons =

Chennai based field hockey franchise team

- Full name: Tamil Nadu Dragons
- Short name: TN Dragons
- League: Hockey India League
- Founded: 2024
- Colors
- Home ground: Chennai

Personnel
- Captain: (India) Amit Rohidas
- Coach: (Australia) Tim White
- Owner: Charles Group
- CEO: Uday Sinh Wala
- Chairman: Jose Charles Martin
- Website: Website
| Home | Away |

Tamil Nadu Dragons is a professional field hockey franchise team based in Chennai, Tamil Nadu. It is owned by Charles Group and competes in the Hockey India League, where it debuted in 2024. Tim White is the head coach of the team.

== Squad ==
=== 2024–2025 ===
| Player | Nationality |
Goalkeepers
| David Harte | Ireland |
| Senthamizh Arasu | India |
| Princedeep Singh | India |
Defenders
| Amit Rohidas | India |
| Jip Janssen | Netherlands |
| Kothajit Singh | India |
| Moritz Ludwig | Germany |
| Anand Y | India |
| Anand Lakra | India |
| Pruthvi GM | India |
Midfielders
| Martin Zwicker | Germany |
| Tom Sorsby | United Kingdom |
| Mohammed Raheel Mouseen | India |
| Tom Craig | Australia |
| Blake Govers | Australia |
| Chandan Yadav | India |
| Sheshe Gowda | India |
| Arun J | India |
| Dhilipan M | India |
Forwards
| Karthi Selvam | India |
| Nathan Ephraums | Australia |
| Majji Ganesh | India |
| Uttam Singh | India |
| Abharan Sudev | India |

=== 2026 ===
| Player | Nationality |
Goalkeepers
| David Harte | Ireland |
| Princedeep Singh | India |
Defenders
| Amit Rohidas | India |
| Moritz Ludwig | Germany |
| Sander de Wijn | Netherlands |
| Anand Lakra | India |
| Pruthvi GM | India |
Midfielders
| Tom Sorsby | United Kingdom |
| Tom Craig | Australia |
| Mohammed Raheel Mouseen | India |
| Sheshe Gowda | India |
| Chandan Yadav | India |
| Arun J | India |
| Adrohit Ekka | India |
| Sushil Dhanwar | India |
Forwards
| Blake Govers | Australia |
| Karthi Selvam | India |
| Nathan Ephraums | Australia |
| Uttam Singh | India |
| K Selvaraj | India |

== Goalscorers ==
| # | Player | Nationality | Goals |
|---|---|---|---|
| 1 | Jip Janssen | Netherlands | 7 |
| 2 | Nathan Ephraums | Australia | 3 |
| 2 | Abharan Sudev | India | 2 |
| 2 | Karthi Selvam | India | 2 |
| 3 | Tom Craig | Australia | 1 |
| 3 | Tom Sorsby | United Kingdom | 1 |
| 3 | Uttam Singh | India | 1 |
| 3 | Blake Govers | Australia | 1 |

== Personnel record ==
=== Coaches ===
| Coach | Duration | Best Result | Ref |
|---|---|---|---|
| (Netherlands) Rein van Eijk | 2024–2025 | 4th | |
| (Australia) Tim White | 2026–present | | |

== Performance record ==
| Season | Standing | Result | Matches | Won | Draw | Lost | Shootout | |
| Season | Standing | Result | Matches | Won | Draw | Lost | W | L |
|---|---|---|---|---|---|---|---|---|
| 2024–25 | 4/8 | 4th | 12 | 4 | 5 | 3 | 2 | 3 |
| 2026 | TBA | | | | | | | |
