= Arshdeep =

Arshdeep is a given name. Notable people with this name include:

- Arshdeep Bains (born 2001), Canadian ice hockey player
- Arshdeep Dosanjh (born 1996), Australian volleyball player
- Arshdeep Singh (disambiguation)
