= UP Rudras =

Lucknow based field hockey franchise team

- Full name: UP Rudras
- League: Hockey India League
- Founded: 2024
- Dissolved: 2025
- Colors
- Home ground: Lucknow

Personnel
- Captain: (India) Hardik Singh
- Coach: (Netherlands) Paul van Ass
- Owner: JK Group; Yadu Sports
- Chairman: Raghavpat Singhania; Madhav Singhania
Home

UP Rudras was a professional field hockey franchise team based in Lucknow that competed in Hockey India League. It was owned by the JK Group. Dutch coach Paul van Ass was the head coach, Thomas Tichelman was the team's assistant coach.

== Squad ==
Player	Nationality	Signed	Salary
Goalkeepers
Prashant Kumar Chauhan	India	2024	₹5 lakhs
James Mazarelo	United Kingdom	2024	₹13 lakhs
Pankaj Kumar Rajak	India	2024	
Defenders
Surender Kumar	India	2024	₹14 lakhs
James Albery	United Kingdom	2024	₹15 lakhs
Talem Priyobarta	India	2024	₹9 lakhs
Midfielders
Hardik Singh (C)	India	2024	₹70 lakhs
Lars Balk	Netherlands	2024	₹40 lakhs
Kane Russell	New Zealand	2024	₹30 lakhs
Akashdeep Singh	India	2024	₹20 lakhs
Floris Wortelboer	Netherlands	2024	₹27 lakhs
James Albery	England	2024	₹10 lakhs
Manmeet Singh	India	2024	₹15.5 lakhs
Forwards
Lalit Upadhyay	India	2024	₹28 lakhs
Sam Ward	United Kingdom	2024	₹12 lakhs
Tanguy Cosyns	Belgium	2024	₹10 lakhs
Gurjot Singh	India	2024	₹14.5 lakhs

== Goalscorers ==
#	Player	Nationality	Goals
1	Kane Russell	New Zealand	3
2	Sudeep Chirmako	India	2
2	Sam Ward	United Kingdom	2
2	Hardik Singh	India	2
3	Jobanpreet Singh	India	1
3	Akashdeep Singh	India	1
3	Floris Wortelboer	Netherlands	1
3	Tanguy Cosyns	Belgium	1

== Performance record ==
Season	Standing	Result	Matches	Won	Draw	Lost	Shootout	
Season	Standing	Result	Matches	Won	Draw	Lost	W	L
2024–25	5/8	5th	10	5	1	4	1	0
