= Shrachi Bengal Tigers =

Bengal based field hockey franchise team

- Full name: Shrachi Bengal Tigers
- League: Hockey India League
- Founded: 2024
- Colors
- Home ground: Kolkata

Personnel
- Coach: (Germany) Valentin Altenburg; (India) Deepak Thakur
- Owner: Shrachi Sports
- Chairman: Rahul Todi

Performance
- Winners: 2024–25
Home	Away

Bengal Tigers, formerly known as Rarh Bengal Tigers is a professional field hockey franchise team based in Kolkata that competes in the Hockey India League. It is owned by Shrachi Sports. At the 2024–25 edition, the men's team won the league and the women's team finished at the third place.

Former Australian players Colin Batch and Glenn Turner are the coaches of the men's and women's teams respectively.

== Ownership ==
Rarh Bengal Tigers is owned by Rahul Todi's Shrachi Sports.

== Men's squad ==
=== 2024–25 ===
Player	Nationality
Goalkeepers
Pirmin Blaak	Netherlands
Ali Khan	India
Atal Dev Singh Chahal	India
Defenders
Jugraj Singh	India
Hayden Beltz	Australia
Gauthier Boccard	Belgium
Rupinder Pal Singh (C)	India
Jasjit Singh Kular	India
Midfielders
Lachlan Sharp	Australia
Jaskaran Singh	India
Sean Findlay	New Zealand
Pardeep Mor	India
Pradhan Chandura	India
Affan Yousuf	India
Atul Deep	India
Yogesh Malik Singh	India
Pardeep Singh Sandhu	India
Thounaojam Ingalemba Lauwang	India
Forwards
Abhishek Nain	India
Sukhjeet Singh	India
Florent Van Aubel	Belgium
Sam Lane	New Zealand
Gursewak Singh	India

== Women's squad ==
=== 2025 ===
The 2025 Hockey India League women's squad of Rarh Bengal Tigers is as follows.

Player	Nationality
Goalkeepers
Grace O'Hanlon	New Zealand
Jennifer Rizzo	United States
Vidyashree V	India
Defenders
Udita Duhan (C)	India
Róisín Upton	Ireland
Elena Neill	Ireland
Marina Lalramnghaki	India
Mahima Choudhary	India
Vandana Patel	India
Midfielders
Eva de Goede	Netherlands
Sarah Hawkshaw	Ireland
Jyothi Edula	India
Huda Khan	India
Binima Dhan	India
Munmuni Das	India
Sushila Chanu	India
Shilpi Dabas	India
Forwards
Vandana Katariya	India
Lalremsiami Hmarzote	India
Beauty Dungdung	India
Ambre Ballenghien	Belgium
Kathryn Mullan	Ireland
Lalrinpuii Pachuau	India
Priyanka Wankhede	India

== Performance record ==
Season	Team	Standing	Result	Matches	Won	Draw	Lost	Shootout		Most Goals
Season	Team	Standing	Result	Matches	Won	Draw	Lost	W	L	Most Goals
2024–25	M	1/8	Winners	12	7	2	3	1	1	Jugraj Singh
2024–25	W	3/4	Third Place	6	2	1	3	0	1	Kathryn Mullan
2025–26	M									
2025–26	W	2/4	Runners-up	6	2	3	2	2	1	Agustina Gorzelany
Champions x1, Runners-up x 1, Third Place x 1

== Goalscorers ==
=== Men's team ===
Rank	Player	Nationality	Goals
1	Jugraj Singh	India	12
2	Rupinder Pal Singh	India	5
2	Sukhjeet Singh	India	3
2	Abhishek Nain	India	2
3	Affan Yousuf	India	1
3	Gauthier Boccard	Belgium	1

=== Women's team ===
Rank	Player	Nationality	Goals
1	Hannah Cotter	New Zealand	1
1	Katie Mullan	Ireland	1
1	Beauty Dungdung	India	1
1	Udita Duhan	India	1
