= Arshdeep Singh (disambiguation) =

Arshdeep Singh (born 1997) is an Indian cricketer

Arshdeep Singh may also refer to:

- Arshdeep Singh (footballer, born 1997), Indian football goalkeeper
- Arshdeep Singh (field hockey) (born 2004), Indian field hockey forward
