= 2022 Men's Hockey Asia Cup =

Field hockey competition

Piala Asia Hoki Pria 2022
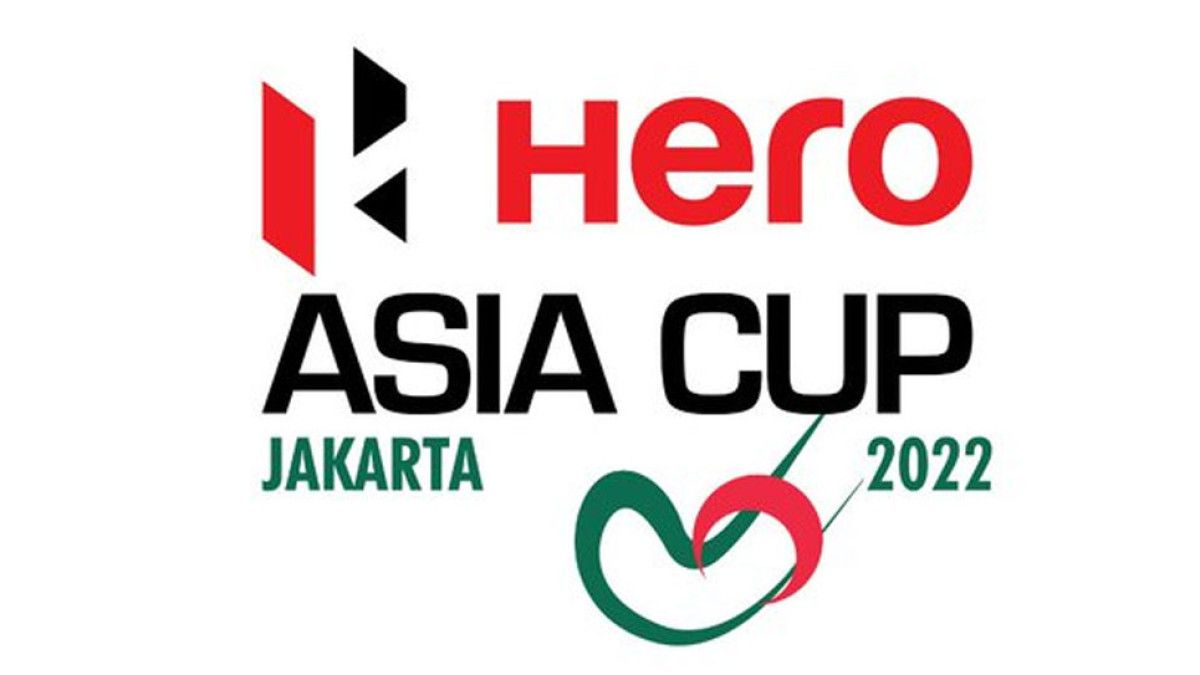
- Hockey Asia Cup 2022

Tournament details
- Host country: Indonesia
- City: Jakarta
- Dates: May 23 – June 1
- Teams: 8 (from 1 confederation)
- Venue: GBK Sports Complex

Final positions
- Champions: South Korea (5th title)
- Runner-up: Malaysia
- Third place: India

Tournament statistics
- Matches played: 24
- Goals scored: 150 (6.25 per match)
- Top scorer: (Malaysia) Razie Rahim (13 goals)
- Best player: (South Korea) Jang Jong-hyun
- Best young player: (India) Uttam Singh
- Best goalkeeper: (Japan) Takashi Yoshikawa

The 2022 Men's Hockey Asia Cup was the eleventh edition of the Men's Hockey Asia Cup, a quadrennial international men's field hockey championship in Asia organized by the Asian Hockey Federation. The tournament took place at the GBK Hockey Field in Jakarta, Indonesia, from May 23 to June 1, 2022.

South Korea won the event, securing their fifth title after defeating Malaysia in the finals. The top three teams that had not already qualified guaranteed their spots in the 2023 Men's FIH Hockey World Cup. Since India, the third-placed team, already qualified as hosts for the World Cup, the fourth-placed Japan also won qualification.

== Qualification ==
Qualification for the tournament was determined based on previous performance. The top five teams from the previous Asia Cup, the host, and the two finalists from the 2022 AHF Cup were eligible for the competition.

=== Qualified teams ===
Dates	Event	Location	Quotas	Qualifiers
October 11-22, 2017	2017 Asia Cup	Dhaka, Bangladesh	5	India; Japan; Malaysia; Pakistan; South Korea
March 15, 2022	Hosts	—N/a	1	Indonesia
March 11-20, 2022	2022 AHF Cup	Jakarta, Indonesia	2	Bangladesh; Oman
Total			8	

== Preliminary round ==
All times are local (UTC+7).

All results are sourced from the International Hockey Federation unless stated otherwise.

=== Pool A ===
Pos	Team	Pld	W	D	L	GF	GA	GD	Pts	Qualification
1	Japan	3	3	0	0	17	4	+13	9	Super4s
2	India	3	1	1	1	19	6	+13	4	Super4s
3	Pakistan	3	1	1	1	16	4	+12	4	
4	Indonesia (H)	3	0	0	3	0	38	−38	0	

Source: FIH
Rules for classification: 1) points; 2) matches won; 3) goal difference; 4) goals for; 5) head-to-head result; 6) field goals for.
(H) Hosts

May 23, 2022
16:15

Japan	9–0	Indonesia
Kirishita 7'; Nagayoshi 8'; Ooka 10'; Kato 13'; Yamasaki 15', 21', 22', 35'; Niwa 33'	Report

Umpires:
Saleh Al-Balushi (OMA)
You Hyo-sik (KOR)

May 23, 2022
18:30

India	1–1	Pakistan
Karthi 9'	Report	Rana 59'

Umpires:
Ben Göntgen (GER)
Salim Lucky (BAN)

May 24, 2022
16:15

Pakistan	13–0	Indonesia
Ahmad 2', 49'; Rana 4', 17'; Manan 6', 19'; R. Ali 15', 25', 43'; M. Ali 16'; Shan 19'; G. Ali 35'; Shakeel 45'	Report

Umpires:
Salim Lucky (BAN)
Saleh Al-Balushi (OMA)

May 24, 2022
18:30

Japan	5–2	India
Nagayoshi 24'; Kawabe 40', 56'; Ooka 49'; Yamasaki 54'	Report	Pawan 45'; Uttam 50'

Umpires:
Nazmi Kamaruddin (MAS)
Lim Hong-Zhen (SGP)

May 26, 2022
16:15

Pakistan	2–3	Japan
Ahmad 23'; M. Ali 30'	Report	Ooka 14'; Saeki 15'; Niwa 27'

Umpires:
Ben Göntgen (GER)
Nazmi Kamaruddin (MAS)

May 26, 2022
18:30

India	16–0	Indonesia
Pawan 10', 11'; Uttam 14'; Sunil 19', 24'; Nilam 20'; Karthi 40', 56'; Dipsan 42', 47', 59', 59', 41'; Sudev 45', 46', 55'	Report

Umpires:
Hideki Kinoshita (JPN)
You Hyo-sik (KOR)

=== Pool B ===
Pos	Team	Pld	W	D	L	GF	GA	GD	Pts	Qualification
1	Malaysia	3	3	0	0	20	5	+15	9	Super4s
2	South Korea	3	2	0	1	15	7	+8	6	Super4s
3	Bangladesh	3	1	0	2	4	15	−11	3	
4	Oman	3	0	0	3	2	14	−12	0	

Source: FIH
Rules for classification: 1) points; 2) matches won; 4) goal difference; 4) goals for; 5) head-to-head result; 6) field goals for.

May 23, 2022
11:45

Malaysia	7–0	Oman
Razie 6', 13', 19'; Faizal 23'; Shahril 34'; Faiz 40'; Ashran 48'	Report

Umpires:
Lim Hong-Zhen (SGP)
Haroon Rashid (PAK)

May 23, 2022
14:00

South Korea	6–1	Bangladesh
Hwang 13', 22'; Jang 18', 52'; Lee N. 32'; Yang 45'	Report	Rahman 6'

Umpires:
Salman (INA)
Diego Barbas (ARG)

May 24, 2022
11:45

Oman	1–2	Bangladesh
Al-Fazari 23'	Report	Islam 6'; Rakibul 40'

Umpires:
Haroon Rashid (PAK)
Rajput Sourabh (IND)

May 24, 2022
16:15

South Korea	4–5	Malaysia
Yang 25', 56'; Jang 34'; Kim S. 40'	Report	Sumantri 11', 27'; Rahim 17', 52'; Hamsani 32'

Umpires:
Germán Montes de Oca (ARG)
Hideki Kinoshita (JPN)

26 May 2022
11:45

Oman	1–5	South Korea
Al-Noufali 22'	Report	Jang 11'; Kim H. 19'; Hwang 33'; Yang 33'; Jeong 45'

Umpires:
Lim Hong-Zhen (SGP)
Salman (INA)

26 May 2022
14:00

Malaysia	8–1	Bangladesh
Rahim 4', 14', 30'; Saari 24', 31', 46'; Jazlan 41'; Hamsani 60'	Report	Islam 21'

Umpires:
Diego Barbas (ARG)
Rajput Sourabh (IND)

== Fifth to eighth place ==
=== Bracket ===
5–8th place semi-finals
28 May
Pakistan	5
Oman	2
29 May
Bangladesh	4
Indonesia	2

Fifth place
1 June
Pakistan	8
Bangladesh	0
Seventh place
31 May
Oman	2
Indonesia	0

=== Fifth to eighth place crossovers ===
28 May 2022
13:30

Pakistan	5–2	Oman
Rana 19'; G. Ali 21'; R. Ali 29', 30'; Shakeel 32'	Report	Al-Fazari 11'; Al-Maaini 44'

Umpires:
Hideki Kinoshita (JPN)
Salman (INA)

29 May 2022
13:30

Bangladesh	4–2	Indonesia
Mahmud 13'; Islam 20'; Emon 24'; Khisa 59'	Report	Al-Akbar 20'; Ardam 36'

Umpires:
You Hyo-sik (KOR)
Saleh Al-Balushi (OMA)

=== Seventh and eighth place ===
31 May 2022
13:30

Oman	2–0	Indonesia
Al-Fazari 9'; Al-Shibli 32'	Report

Umpires:
Haroon Rashid (PAK)
You Hyo-sik (KOR)

=== Fifth and sixth place ===
1 June 2022
13:30

Pakistan	8–0	Bangladesh
R. Ali 11'; M. Ali 16', 32'; Afraz 39'; Shahid 42'; Bhutta 48'; Ahmad 53'; G. Ali 60'	Report

Umpires:
Salman (INA)
Saleh Al-Balushi (OMA)

== First to fourth place ==
=== Super4s ===
Pos	Team	Pld	W	D	L	GF	GA	GD	Pts	Qualification
1	Malaysia	3	1	2	0	10	5	+5	5	Final
2	South Korea	3	1	2	0	9	7	+2	5	Final
3	India	3	1	2	0	9	8	+1	5	Third place match
4	Japan	3	0	0	3	2	10	−8	0	Third place match

Source: FIH

28 May 2022
16:00

Malaysia	2–2	South Korea
Razu 4'; Ashran 40'	Report	Lee N. 12'; Jeong 21'

Umpires:
Diego Barbas (ARG)
Salim Lucky (BAN)

28 May 2022
18:30

India	2–1	Japan
Manjeet 8'; Pawan 35'	Report	Niwa 18'

Umpires:
Germán Montes de Oca (ARG)
Nazmi Kamaruddin (MAS)

29 May 2022
16:00

Japan	1–3	South Korea
Yamasaki 60'	Report	Jang 11'; Hwang 34'; Lee N. 60'

Umpires:
Rajput Sourabh (IND)
Ben Göntgen (GER)

29 May 2022
18:30

Malaysia	3–3	India
Razie 12', 21', 56'	Report	Vishnukant 32'; Sunil 53'; Nilam 55'

Umpires:
Haroon Rashid (PAK)
Lim Hong-Zhen (SGP)

31 May 2022
16:00

Japan	0–5	Malaysia
	Report	Silverius 15'; Aiman 30'; Razie 34'; Hassan 35'; Ashran 42'

Umpires:
Germán Montes de Oca (ARG)
Diego Barbas (ARG)

31 May 2022
18:30

India	4–4	South Korea
Nilam 9'; Maninder 21'; Sheshe 22'; Mareeswaran 37'	Report	Jang 13'; Ji 18'; Kim Ju. 28'; Jung 44'

Umpires:
Lim Hong-Zhen (SGP)
Hideki Kinoshita (JPN)

=== Third and fourth place ===
1 June 2022
16:00

India	1–0	Japan
Raj 7'	Report

Umpires:
Nazmi Kamaruddin (MAS)
Salim Lucky (BAN)

=== Final ===
1 June 2022
18:30

Malaysia	1–2	South Korea
Cholan 25'	Report	Jung 17'; Hwang 52'

Umpires:
Ben Göntgen (GER)
Rajput Sourabh (IND)

== Final standings ==
Rank	Team
Gold medal	South Korea
Silver medal	Malaysia
Bronze medal	India
4	Japan
5	Pakistan
6	Bangladesh
7	Oman
8	Indonesia

Qualified for the 2023 World Cup
Qualified for the 2023 World Cup as host

== Statistics ==
=== Goalscorers ===
There were 150 goals scored in 24 matches, for an average of 6.25 goals per match.

13 goals

- (Malaysia) Razie Rahim

6 goals

- (Japan) Koji Yamasaki
- (Pakistan) Rizwan Ali
- (South Korea) Jang Jong-hyun

5 goals

- (India) Dipsan Tirkey
- (Malaysia) Ashran Hamsani
- (South Korea) Hwang Tae-il

4 goals

- (India) Pawan Rajhbar
- (Malaysia) Faizal Saari
- (Pakistan) Ajaz Ahmad
- (Pakistan) Mubashar Ali
- (Pakistan) Waheed Rana
- (South Korea) Yang Ji-hun

3 goals

- (Bangladesh) Ashraful Islam
- (India) Nilam Sanjeep Xess
- (India) Selvam Karthi
- (India) Sudev Belimagga
- (India) S. V. Sunil
- (Japan) Takuma Niwa
- (Japan) Ryoma Ooka
- (Oman) Rashad Al-Fazari
- (Pakistan) Ghazanfar Ali
- (South Korea) Lee Nam-yong

2 goals

- (India) Uttam Singh
- (Japan) Kosei Kawabe
- (Japan) Ken Nagayoshi
- (Malaysia) Norsyafiq Sumantri
- (Pakistan) Abdul Manan
- (Pakistan) Moin Shakeel
- (South Korea) Jeong Jun-woo
- (South Korea) Jung Man-jae

1 goal

- (Bangladesh) Deen Emon
- (Bangladesh) Puskar Khisa
- (Bangladesh) Rashel Mahmud
- (Bangladesh) Khorshadur Rahman
- (Bangladesh) Mohammad Rakibul
- (India) Sheshe Gowda
- (India) Manjeet
- (India) Raj Kumar Pal
- (India) Mareeswaran Sakthivel
- (India) Maninder Singh
- (India) Vishnukant Singh
- (Indonesia) Abdullah Al-Akbar
- (Indonesia) Ardam
- (Japan) Ryosei Kato
- (Japan) Yoshiki Kirishita
- (Japan) Ikumi Saeki
- (Malaysia) Syed Cholan
- (Malaysia) Muhammad Hassan
- (Malaysia) Faiz Jali
- (Malaysia) Najmi Jazlan
- (Malaysia) Aiman Rozemi
- (Malaysia) Shahril Saabah
- (Malaysia) Shello Silverius
- (Oman) Aseel Al-Maaini
- (Oman) Aliyas Al-Noufali
- (Oman) Asama Al-Shibli
- (Pakistan) Afraz
- (Pakistan) Umar Bhutta
- (Pakistan) Hannan Shahid
- (Pakistan) Ali Shan
- (South Korea) Ji Woo-cheon
- (South Korea) Kim Hyeong-jin
- (South Korea) Kim Jung-hoo
- (South Korea) Kim Sung-hyun

Source: FIH

== See also ==
- 2022 Women's Hockey Asia Cup
- 2022 Men's Indoor Hockey Asia Cup
- 2023 Men's FIH Hockey World Cup
- Field hockey at the 2022 Asian Games – Men's tournament
