= Prince Deep Singh =

Indian field hockey player

Personal information
- Born: 8 June 2004 (age 22) Pathankot district, Punjab, India

Sport
- Sport: Field hockey
- Position: Goalkeeper
- Club: Hockey Punjab
Senior career
Years	Team	Caps	Goals
–	Roundglass Punjab Club	-	-
–	Hockey Punjab	-	-
National team
Years	Team	Caps	Goals
2024–2025	India U21	18	(0)
Medal record
Men's field hockey
Representing India
Junior World Cup
Bronze medal – third place	2025 Tamilnadu
Junior Asia Cup
Gold medal – first place	2024 Muscat

Prince Deep Singh (also Princedeep; born 8 June 2004) is an Indian hockey player from Punjab. He plays for the India men's national field hockey team as a goalkeeper. He is registered with the Roundglass Punjab Hockey Club, and plays for Hockey Punjab in the domestic tournaments. He played for Tamil Nadu Dragons in the Hockey India League 2025.

== Early life ==
Singh is from Pathankot district, Punjab. He started playing hockey in 2016 and soon joined Malwa Hockey Academy, Ludhiana, before shifting to Roundglass Punjab Hockey Club Academy to polish his skills.

== Career ==
Singh's first major tournament was the 2nd Hockey India Junior Men Academy National Championship 2022 where he represented Roundglass Academy and later player for Punjab in the 5th Khelo India Youth Games 2022 at Gwalior and won a bronze. He was also part of the Hockey Punjab team in the 13th Hockey India Junior Men National Championship that in June 2023 at Rourkela, Odisha. In 2024, he was selected among the 40-member probables for the Junior Men's National coaching camp in Bengaluru. He was also a member of the Indian team which won gold at the Junior Asia Cup in 2024 at Muscat. In the quarter-final against Belgium at the 2025 Junior World Cup, he made two saves in the shootout as India won it 4–3. He was named as the Player of the Match.

In January 2025, he was selected to play the 2024–25 Men's FIH Pro League.
