= Jyothi Edula =

Indian field hockey player

Personal information
- Full name: Edula Jyothi Reddy
- Born: 30 May 2002 (age 24) Telangana, India

Sport
- Sport: Field hockey
- Position: Midfielder
Senior career
Years	Team	Caps	Goals
–	Telangana Hockey	-	-
–	Railways	-	-
2025–	Rarh Bengal Tigers	-	-
National team
Years	Team	Caps	Goals
2023	India U21		-

Edula Jyothi Reddy (born 30 May 2002) is an Indian field hockey player from Telangana. She plays for the India women's national field hockey team as a midfielder. She plays for Railway Sports Promotion Board and Telangana Hockey in the domestic tournaments. She played four matches for Shrachi Rarh Bengal Tigers in the Hero Hockey India League 2024.

Jyothi was selected to the senior India team in June 2024 for the 2023-24 FIH women's Hockey Pro League but she is yet to make her debut in the playing XI. Earlier, she was also part of the Indian Junior Women's team that took part in the FIH Junior World Cup for women.
