= Team Gonasika =

Vizag based field hockey franchise team

- Full name: Team Gonasika
- League: Hockey India League
- Founded: 2024
- Dissolved: 2025
- Colors
- Home ground: Visakhapatnam

Personnel
- Captain: (India) Manpreet Singh
- Coach: (South Africa) Paul Revington
- Owner: Tarini Prasad Mohanty
Home

Team Gonasika was a field hockey franchise based in Visakhapatnam that competed in the Hockey India League. Paul Revington was the head coach of the team. The team dissolved after competing in one season.

== Squad ==
Player	Nationality	Signed	Salary
Goalkeepers
Ollie Payne	United Kingdom	2024	₹15 lakhs
Suraj Karkera	India	2024	₹22 lakhs
Kamalbir Singh	India	2024	₹2 lakhs
Defenders
Birendra Lakra	India	2024	₹10 lakhs
Amir Ali	India	2024	₹34 lakhs
Nilam Sanjeep Xess	India	2024	₹17 lakhs
Yogember Rawat	India	2024	₹11 lakhs
Timothy Howard	Australia	2024	₹20 lakhs
Dipsan Tirkey	India	2024	₹6.6 lakhs
Anmol Ekka	India	2024	₹9.2 lakhs
Midfielders
Manpreet Singh (C)	India	2024	₹42 lakhs
Vishnukant Singh	India	2024	₹20 lakhs
Jack Waller	United Kingdom	2024	₹10 lakhs
Lee Morton	United Kingdom	2024	₹10 lakhs
Jacob Draper	United Kingdom	2024	₹5 lakhs
Timothée Clément	France	2024	₹7.2 lakhs
Forwards
Mandeep Singh	India	2024	₹25 lakhs
Araijeet Singh Hundal	India	2024	₹42 lakhs
Struan Walker	United Kingdom	2024	₹21 lakhs
Victor Charlet	France	2024	₹26 lakhs

== Performance record ==
Season	Standing	Result	Matches	Won	Draw	Lost	Shootout	
Season	Standing	Result	Matches	Won	Draw	Lost	W	L
2024–25	7/8	7th	10	3	2	5	1	1
