= Manmeet Singh =

Indian field hockey player

Personal information
- Full name: Manmeet Singh Khehra
- Born: 2 December 2005 (age 20) Tarn Taran, Punjab, India

Sport
- Sport: Field hockey
- Position: Mid-fielder
Senior career
Years	Team	Caps	Goals
2021–	Hockey Punjab	16	10
2024–25	UP Rudras	10	-
2026–	HIL GC	6	-
National team
Years	Team	Caps	Goals
2024–2025	India U21	24	(9)
2026–	India	2	-
Medal record
Men's field hockey
Representing India
Junior World Cup
Bronze medal – third place	2025 Tamilnadu
Junior Asia Cup
Gold medal – first place	2024 Muscat

Manmeet Singh (born 2 December 2005) is an Indian field hockey player, representing the national senior team as a mid-fielder.

== Early life ==
Manmeet Singh hails from Verowal Bawian village of Tarn Taran district in Punjab. His father, who was an Army team player, taught Manmeet hockey and Olympian Akashdeep Singh is his uncle. He trained at the Baba Gurmukh Singh Baba Uttam Singh Senior Secondary School in Khadur Sahib.

== Career ==
Manmeet Singh became part of the Indian junior team in the 2024 Europe tour. He scored a goal against Great Britain and one against New Zealand at the 2024 Sultan of Johor Cup. He provided the assist for Araijeet's goal against Pakistan in the 2024 Junior Asia Cup final, which India won 5–3. He also scored one and gave the lead for India against Pakistan at the 2025 Sultan of Johor Cup, before the latter equalised to draw the match.

Manmeet scored hat-trick against Oman at the 2025 Junior World Cup. He hit an equaliser through a penalty corner against Argentina in the bronze medal match as India came from 0–2 down to win 4–2.

Manmeet Singh made debut for the Indian senior team against Argentina at the 2025–26 Men's FIH Pro League. He played in the Centenary hockey series against New Zealand in November 2026.
