= Floris Wortelboer =

Dutch field hockey player

Personal information
- Born: 4 August 1996 (age 30) Teteringen, Netherlands

Sport
- Sport: Field hockey
- Position: Defender / Midfielder
- Club: Bloemendaal
Youth career
- Team
- –: Teteringen
- –: Push
Senior career
Years	Team	Caps	Goals
–2015	Push	-	-
2015–2017	Den Bosch	-	-
2017–present	Bloemendaal	-	-
2024–present	→ UP Rudras	-	-
National team
Years	Team	Caps	Goals
2015–2016	Netherlands U21	10	(0)
2017–present	Netherlands	118	(6)
Medal record
Men's field hockey
Representing the Netherlands
Olympic Games
Gold medal – first place	2024 Paris	Team
World Cup
Bronze medal – third place	2023 Bhubaneswar–Rourkela
EuroHockey Championships
Gold medal – first place	2017 Amstelveen
Gold medal – first place	2023 Mönchengladbach
Silver medal – second place	2025 Mönchengladbach
Champions Trophy
Bronze medal – third place	2018 Breda

Floris Wortelboer (born 4 August 1996) is a Dutch professional field hockey player who plays as a defender or midfielder for Hoofdklasse club Bloemendaal and the Dutch national team.

== Club career ==
Wortelboer first played football when he was young but when he was around seven years old he made the switch to hockey and started playing at the local hockey club Teteringen. He then made the switch to Push where he played from the under-12 teams until the first senior men's team. In 2017 he made the switch to Den Bosch where he signed for two seasons. After those two seasons he moved to Bloemendaal in 2017. For the 2024–25 Hockey India League, he was signed by the UP Rudras for a total of ₹27 lakhs.

== International career ==
=== Under–21 ===
Wortelboer made his debut for the Netherlands U–21 team in 2015 during a test series in Breda. The following year he went on to represent the team at the FIH Junior World Cup in Lucknow.

=== Oranje ===
Floris Wortelboer made his senior debut for the Oranje in 2017. He played his first international during the Summer Series in Cape Town. He went on to win his major medal with the team that year, taking home gold at the EuroHockey Championship in Amsterdam.

He went on to add two bronze medals to his collection. His first at the 2018 FIH Champions Trophy in Breda, as well as the 2019 FIH Pro League in Amsterdam.
