= Ishika =

- Gender: Female

Origin
- Region of origin: India

Ishika (ईशिका) is a feminine given name. Notable people with the name include:

== People ==
- Ishika Jaiswal (b. 28 July 2003), Indian-American a professional badminton player
- Ishika Taneja (b. 2 September 1994), beauty pageant contestant and businesswoman
- Ishika Sambharwal (b. 10 May 2005), Indian field hockey player
- Ishika Chaudhary (b. 15 April 2000), Indian field hockey player

== Fictional characters ==
- Ishika Desai, a bogus-millionaire in 2011's Ladies vs Ricky Bahl
- Ishika Dhanrajgir, a character in 2000's Mohabbatein
- Ishika Kanojia, a character in Welcome (2007 film)
- Ishika Kashyap, a character in 2010's Sasural Genda Phool
- Ishika Patel, a love interest in 2018's Roop - Mard Ka Naya Swaroop
- Ishika, a character in 2008's Miley Jab Hum Tum
