= Madhuri Kindo =

Indian field hockey player

Personal information
- Born: 25 February 2002 (age 24) Biramitrapur, Odisha, India

Sport
- Sport: Field hockey
- Position: Goalkeeper
Senior career
Years	Team	Caps	Goals
–	Hockey Association of Odisha	-	-
2025–	Odisha Warriors	-	-
National team
Years	Team	Caps	Goals
2023	India U21		-
Medal record
Women's field hockey
Representing India
Junior Asia Cup
Gold medal – first place	2023 Japan

Madhuri Kindo (born 25 February 2002) is an Indian field hockey player from Odisha. She plays as a goalkeeper for the India women's national field hockey team. She is yet to make her debut in the playing XI. She made her Junior India debut in 2021.

== Early life ==
Kindo grew up in a farming family in Birmitrapur Odisha. She got interested in hockey by watching her brother Manoj Kindo play hockey, while their father, Shankar Kindo worked in the fields. Inspired by him, she started playing hockey too and joined the Panposh Sports Hostel in 2012. She initially played as a defender but later became a goalkeeper.

== Career ==
Kindo participated in several national championships representing Odisha, and in 2021, she was selected for the Indian junior team. Madhuri's performance at the Junior Women's Asia Cup 2023 in Japan helped her team win the gold medal. She received a job offer from Western Railways in Mumbai.

In April 2024, Madhuri joined the Indian team during an evaluation camp at SAI Bengaluru.

She was part of the Odisha team that finished 5th in the 11th Hockey Indian Junior Women National Championships in Simdega, Jharkhand, from October 20–29, 2021. She was the goalkeeper for the Hockey Gangpur-Odisha team, which won the bronze medal in the 8th Hockey India Junior Women National Championship (Division-A) held in Bhopal, Madhya Pradesh, from April 26 to May 6, 2018. Additionally, she represented Hockey Gangpur-Odisha in the 8th Senior Women National Hockey Championship (Division-A) in Ranchi, Jharkhand, from February 1–11, 2018.
