= Ishika Sambharwal =

Indian hockey player (born 2000)

Personal information
- Born: 10 May 2005 (age 21) Bhiwani, Haryana, India

Sport
- Country: India
- Sport: Field hockey
- Position: Forward
Senior career
Years	Team	Caps	Goals
2025–	Delhi SG Pipers	-	-
National team
Years	Team	Caps	Goals
2024–2025	India U21		-
2026–	India	22	(8)
Medal record
Asian Games
Gold medal – first place	2026 Aichi–Nagoya	Team

Ishika Sambharwal (born 10 May 2005) is an Indian field hockey player from Haryana, who plays as a forward for the India women's national field hockey team and Delhi SG Pipers in the Hockey India League.

== Early life ==
Ishika was born on 10 May 2005 in Bhiwani, Haryana—a region traditionally known across India for producing prominent boxers and wrestlers. She opted instead to pursue field hockey and rose through Haryana's youth ranks and national domestic competitions before being drafted into the national setup.

== International career ==
=== Junior ===
Ishika represented India at the junior international level. She featured at the Women's Junior Asia Cup in 2024 and was selected for the Indian squad at the 2025 Women's FIH Hockey Junior World Cup held in Santiago, Chile. During the Junior World Cup, she scored two goals in the competition, including a field goal in a 3–1 classification victory over Wales.

=== Senior ===
Ishika received her maiden call-up to the senior national team under head coach Sjoerd Marijne in 2026, making her senior international debut during the 2026 Women's FIH Hockey World Cup Qualifiers held in Hyderabad, Telangana. She also represented India during the FIH Hockey Women's Nations Cup campaign.

== Club career ==
In the Women's Hockey India League, Ishika was signed by Delhi SG Pipers, coached by Belgian Olympian Sofie Gierts. Playing as an attacking forward alongside teammates Sunelita Toppo, Jyoti Singh, and captain Navneet Kaur, she contributed to the Pipers finishing on top of the league table to reach the tournament final against Shrachi Bengal Tigers.
