= Baljeet Kaur =

Indian field hockey player

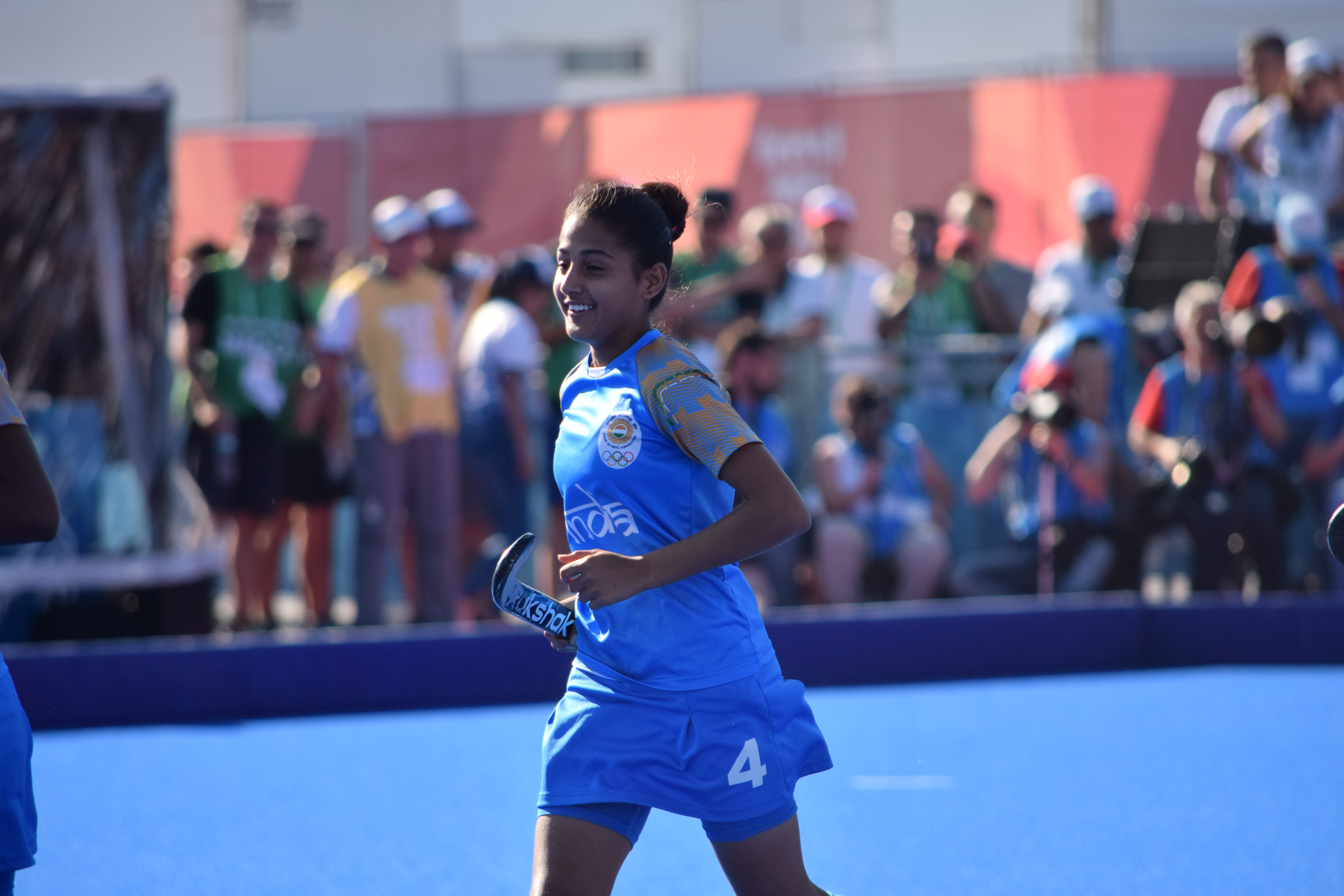
- Baljeet at the 2018 Summer Youth Olympics

Personal information
- Born: 22 March 2001 (age 25) Punjab, India

Sport
- Sport: Field hockey
- Position: Midfielder
Senior career
| Years | Team | Caps | Goals |
| – | Hockey Punjab | - | - |
| – | Indian Oil Corporation | - | - |
| 2025– | Odisha Warriors | - | - |
National team
| Years | Team | Caps | Goals |
| 2018 | India U18 Hockey5s | 13 | (3) |
| 2019–2022 | India U21 | 14 | (0) |
| 2022– | India | 56 | (3) |
Medal record
Women's field hockey
Representing India
Asian Games
| Gold medal – first place | 2026 Aichi–Nagoya | Team |
Asian Champions Trophy
| Gold medal – first place | 2023 Ranchi |
Youth Olympic Games
| Silver medal – second place | 2018 Buenos Aires | Team |

Baljeet Kaur (born 22 March 2001) is an Indian field hockey player and member of Indian women's hockey team. She hails from Punjab. She plays for Indian Oil Corporation Limited in the domestic hockey tournaments. She plays as a midfielder. She played for Odisha Warriors in the inaugural women's Hockey India League.

== Career ==
Baljeet is from Tarn Taran Sahib, Tarn Taran district, Punjab. She played the 2022 Junior World Cup at Potchefstroom, South Africa where India got 4th position. She was part of the team that played at the 2018 Youth Olympics Games in Buenos Aires, Argentina, where India bagged a silver medal. After the Games, on 21 October 2018, the Prime Minister Narendra Modi wished her on Twitter.

She made her senior India debut in June 2022 at the FIH Hockey Pro League. She was also part of the Indian women's hockey tour of Australia in May 2023 as part of Indian team's preparation for Asian Games. In 2019, she was also part of the Junior Indian team's tour of Chile.
