= Nilam Sanjeep Xess =

Indian field hockey player (born 1998)

Personal information
- Born: 7 November 1998 (age 28) Kadobahal, Raiboga Sundergarh, Odisha, India

Sport
- Sport: Field hockey
- Position: Defender
Youth career
- Years: Team
- 2016: India U18
Senior career
Years	Team	Caps	Goals
–	Hockey Odisha	-	-
2024–	Team Gonasika	-	-
National team
Years	Team	Caps	Goals
2016–	India	66	(6)
Medal record
Men's field hockey
Representing India
Asia Cup
Gold medal – first place	2025 Rajgir
Bronze medal – third place	2022 Jakarta
Asian Champions Trophy
Bronze medal – third place	2021 Dhaka
South Asian Games
Silver medal – second place	2016 Guwahati	Team
Boys' Asia Cup
Gold medal – first place	2016 Dhaka

Nilam Sanjeep Xess (born 7 November 1998) is an Indian field hockey player who plays as a defender.

== Career ==
He made his international debut for the national senior team at the 2016 South Asian Games. He led the Indian boys' team to win the 2016 Youth Asia Cup.
