= Jaipal Singh Stadium =

Multi-purpose stadium in Jharkhand, India

- Interactive map of Jaipal Singh Stadium
- Full name: Jaipal Singh Stadium
- Location: Ahirtoli, Ranchi, Jharkhand 834001
- Coordinates: 23°37′48″N 85°32′33″E
- Owner: Government of Jharkhand
- Operator: Ranchi Municipal Corporation
- Capacity: 5,000

Construction
- Groundbreaking: 1977
- Built: 1978
- Opened: 1978
- Renovated: 2023

Jaipal Singh Stadium is a multi-purpose stadium located in the city of Ranchi in Jharkhand, India. It was built in 1978 and named after the famous hockey player and captain Jaipal Singh Munda after a request was made by Birsa Seva Dal.

After it was built, the infrastructure was neglected until 2013, when the Government of Jharkhand and Ranchi Municipal Corporation made plans to revamp it into a sports complex with aid from the central government.

In 2008, a proposal came from the urban development minister, Raghubar Das, to make the stadium's site into a shopping complex but the plan was opposed by residents and sports lovers as well as councillors. Sport lovers and residents created "Jaipal Singh Stadium Bachao Sangharsh Samiti" to save the stadium.

In a proposal in 2013, the stadium would undergo changes and have a 300 by 150 metres football ground, tennis court, badminton court, multi-gymnasium with modern equipment, two pavilions, open-air theatre, food court and shops.

The stadium has hosted numerous games since being renovated. It has hosted the Women's Asian Champions Trophy 2023 and the 2024–25 Hockey India League.

== See also ==
- Birsa Munda Athletics Stadium
- Birsa Munda Football Stadium
- Birsa Munda Hockey Stadium
- JSCA International Stadium Complex
- List of stadiums by capacity
