= Zachary Wallace =

English field hockey player (born 1999)

Zach Wallace
Personal information
- Born: 29 September 1999 (age 27) Redhill, England
- Height: 1.72 m (5 ft 8 in)

Sport
- Sport: Field hockey
- Position: Midfielder / Forward
- Club: Bloemendaal
Senior career
Years	Team	Caps	Goals
2015–2021	Surbiton	-	-
2021–2023	HGC	-	-
2023–present	Bloemendaal	-	-
2024–present	Hyderabad Toofans	-	-
National team
Years	Team	Caps	Goals
2017–2019	England & GB U21	19	(5)
2018–present	England & GB	101	(20)
Medal record
Men's field hockey
Representing England
EuroHockey Championship
Silver medal – second place	2023 Mönchengladbach
Commonwealth Games
Bronze medal – third place	2022 Birmingham	Team
EuroHockey Junior Championship
Silver medal – second place	2019 Valencia

Zachary Andrew David Wallace (born 29 September 1999) is an English field hockey player who plays as a midfielder or forward for Dutch Hoofdklasse club Bloemendaal and is the current captain of both the England and Great Britain national teams. He competed at the 2020 Summer Olympics and 2024 Summer Olympics.

== Biography ==
Wallace was educated at Kingston Grammar School, Kingston-upon-Thames before joining Whitgift School, South Croydon, London in the 6th form.

He started his hockey career with Surbiton in the Men's England Hockey League Premier Division. While at Surbiton, Wallace made his senior international debuts in October 2018, aged 19, for Great Britain versus Belgium on 2 October 2018 and for England versus France on 16 October 2018. In December 2019, he was nominated for the FIH Rising Star of the Year Award.

In March 2021 it was announced that Wallace had joined Dutch Hoofdklasse club HGC for the 2021–22 season. On 28 May 2021, he was selected in the England squad for the 2021 EuroHockey Championship and was selected to represent Great Britain in the delayed 2020 Olympic Games in Tokyo.

He won a bronze medal as captain of the England team in the Men's tournament at the 2022 Commonwealth Games in Birmingham. He won a silver medal with England at the 2023 Men's EuroHockey Championship in Mönchengladbach.

After two seasons with HGC, he moved to Bloemendaal.

He was selected to represent Great Britain at the 2024 Summer Olympics. The team went out in the quarter-finals after losing a penalty shootout to India.

Walalce joined Hyderabad Toofans in the Hockey India League after being acquired in auction for the 2024-25 season.
