= Pasha Gademan =

21st century field hockey coach

Personal information
- Nationality: Dutch
- Born: 6 March 1988 (age 38)

Sport
- Country: Netherlands
- Team: Canada (coach)

Pasha Gademan (born 6 March 1988) is a Dutch field hockey coach of the Canadian national team.

He managed the Canadian team at the 2020 Summer Olympics.
