= Sumit Walmiki =

Indian field hockey player

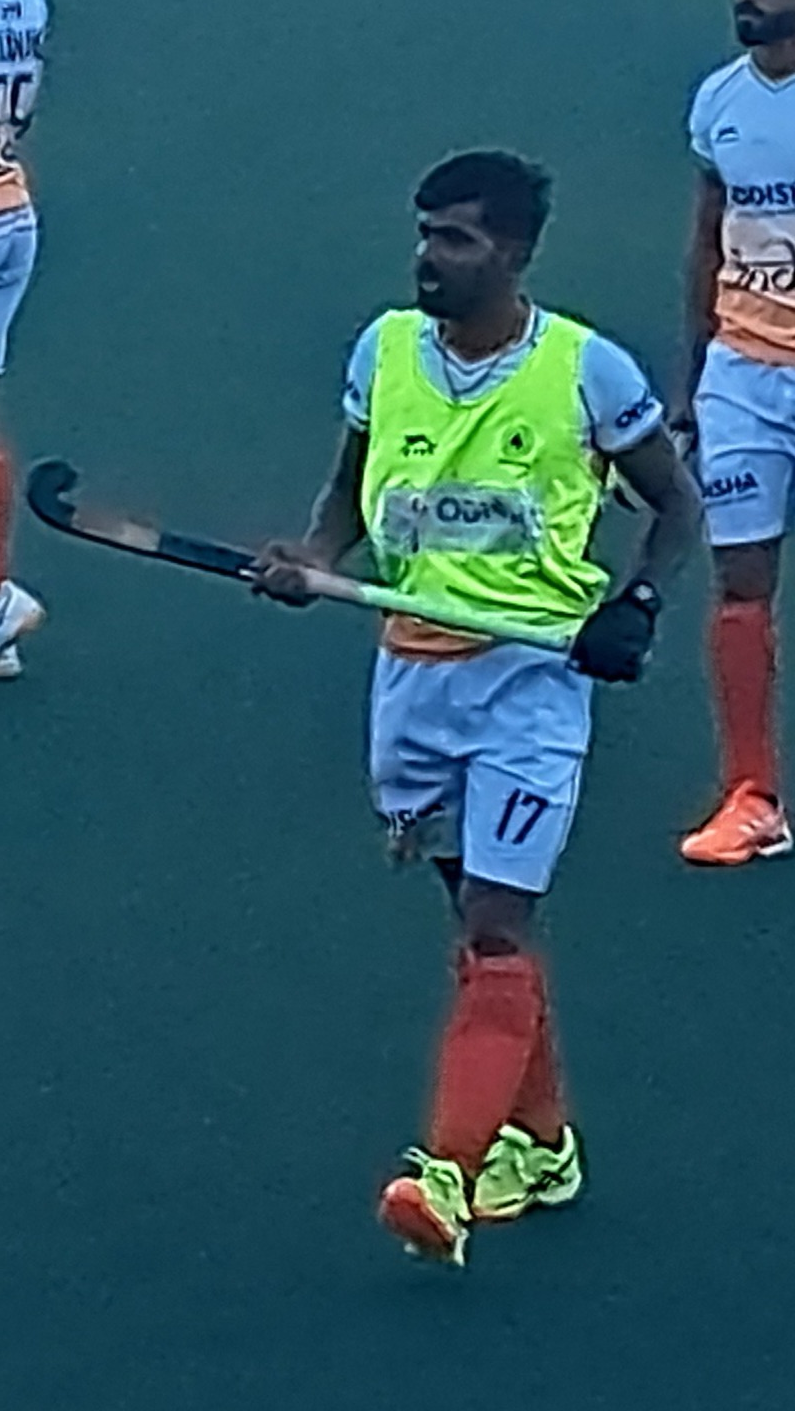
- Warm-ups - South Africa vs India, 2025

Personal information
- Born: 20 December 1996 (age 29) Sonipat, Haryana, India
- Height: 1.69 m (5 ft 7 in)

Sport
- Sport: Field hockey
- Position: Midfielder
Senior career
Years	Team	Caps	Goals
–	Punjab SC	-	-
–	Petroleum Sports Promotion Board	-	-
–	ONGC	-	-
–	Hockey Haryana	-	-
2024–	Hyderabad Toofans	-	-
National team
Years	Team	Caps	Goals
2014–2016	India U21	12	(0)
2017–	India	192	(8)
2022–	India Hockey5s	5	(0)
Medal record
Men's field hockey
Representing India
Olympic Games
Bronze medal – third place	2020 Tokyo	Team
Bronze medal – third place	2024 Paris	Team
World League
Bronze medal – third place	2016–17 Bhubaneswar	Team
Asian Games
Gold medal – first place	2022 Hangzhou	Team
Gold medal – first place	2026 Aichi-Nagoya	Team
Asia Cup
Gold medal – first place	2017 Dhaka
Gold medal – first place	2025 Rajgir
Asian Champions Trophy
Gold medal – first place	2018 Muscat
Gold medal – first place	2023 Chennai
Gold medal – first place	2024 Hulunbuir
Bronze medal – third place	2021 Dhaka
FIH Hockey5s
Gold medal – first place	2022 Lausanne
Junior World Cup
Gold medal – first place	2016 Lucknow

Sumit Walmiki (born 20 December 1996) is an Indian field hockey player who plays as a midfielder for the Indian national team.

Hailing from Haryana, Sumit was part of the Indian squad that won the 2016 Junior World Cup. He made his senior team debut at the 2017 Sultan Azlan Shah Cup. He won two Asiad gold medals as part of the Indian team at the 2022 Asian Games and 2026 Asian Games.
