= APL Pipers =

Field hockey franchise team in India

- Full name: APL Pipers
- League: Hockey India League
- Founded: 2024 (as Delhi SG Pipers)
- Colors

Personnel
- Captain: Jarmanpreet Singh; Navneet Kaur
- Coach: (Netherlands) Tim Oudenaller; (Belgium) Sofie Gierts
- Mentor: (India) PR Sreejesh
- Owner: SG Sports and Entertainment
- CEO: Mahesh Bhupathi
- Website: https://sgseworld.com
Home	Away

APL Pipers, formerly the Delhi SG Pipers, is a field hockey franchise that competes in the Hockey India League. The franchise is owned by SG Sports and Entertainment.

Former Indian goalkeeper PR Sreejesh is the director of both the Men's and Women's teams.

== Men's Squad ==
=== 2024–25 ===
Player	Nationality
Goalkeepers
Tomás Santiago	Argentina
Pawan Malik	India
Adarsh G	India
Defenders
Jarmanpreet Singh	India
Varun Kumar	India
Rohit	India
Corey Weyer	Australia
Gareth Furlong	Wales
Joginder Singh	India
Midfielders
Raj Kumar Pal	India
Ky Willott	Australia
Ankit Pal	India
Lucas Toscani	Argentina
Jacob Whetton (C)	Australia
Forwards
Shamsher Singh (C)	India
Tomas Domene	Argentina
Koji Yamasaki	Japan
Dilraj Singh	India
Aditya Lalage	India
Sourabh Kushwaha	India
Sumit Kumar	India

=== 2026 ===
Player	Nationality
Goalkeepers
Tomás Santiago	Argentina
Pawan Malik	India
Defenders
Jarmanpreet Singh (C)	India
Varun Kumar	India
Rohit	India
Manjeet Rathee	India
Gareth Furlong	Wales
Rupinder Pal Singh	India
Bram van Battum	Netherlands
Midfielders
Shamsher Singh	India
Jacob Draper	Wales
Raj Kumar Pal	India
Ankit Pal	India
Kingson Singh	India
Ky Willott (VC)	Australia
Forwards
Tomas Domene	Argentina
Roman Duvekot	Belgium
Dilraj Singh	India
Aditya Lalage	India
Sourabh Kushwaha	India

== Women's Squad ==
=== 2025 ===
Player	Nationality
Goalkeepers
Bichu Devi Kharibam	India
Elodie Picard	Belgium
Bansari Solanki	India
Defenders
Emma Puvrez	Belgium
Jyoti Singh	India
Stephanie De Groof	Belgium
Giselle Ansley	United Kingdom
Miri Maroney	Australia
Lizzie Neal	United Kingdom
Midfielders
Manisha Chauhan	India
Xan de Waard	Netherlands
Khaidem Chanu	India
Manisha	India
Manashri Shedage	India
Forwards
Sunelita Toppo	India
Sangita Kumari	India
Navneet Kaur (C)	India
Deepika Sehrawat	India
Mumtaz Khan	India
Ishika Chaudhary	India
Geeta Yadav	India
Charlotte Watson	United Kingdom
Preeti Dubey	India
Himanshi Gawande	India

=== 2026 ===
Player	Nationality
Goalkeepers
Bansari Solanki	India
Cristina Cosentino	Argentina
Defenders
Jyoti Singh	India
Manisha Chauhan	India
Valentina Costa Biondi	Argentina
Lola Riera	Spain
Udita Duhan	India
Suman Devi Thoudam	India
Midfielders
Sunelita Toppo	India
Ishika Chaudhary	India
Shileima Chanu	India
Victoria Sauze	Argentina
Kaitlin Nobbs (VC)	Australia
Shilpi Dabas	India
Juana Castellaro	Argentina
Forwards
Navneet Kaur (C)	India
Deepika Sehrawat	India
Sharmila Godara	India
Teresa Viana	Uruguay
Preeti Dubey	India
Priscila Jardel	Argentina

== Personnel Record ==
=== Current staff ===
Position	Team		Ref
Position	M	W	Ref
Coach	(Netherlands) Tim Oudenaller	(Belgium) Sofie Gierts	
Director	(India) Sreejesh PR		

=== Coaches Record ===
Coach	Nationality	Team	Duration	Ref
Graham Reid	Australia	M	2024–2025	
Dave Smolenaars	Netherlands	W	2025	
Tim Oudenaller	Netherlands	M	2026–present	
Sofie Gierts	Belgium	W	2026–present	

== Goalscorers ==
=== Men's team ===
Rank	Player	Nationality	Goals
1	Tomas Domene	Argentina	7
2	Gareth Furlong	United Kingdom	2
2	Corey Weyer	Australia	2
2	Dilraj Singh	India	2
3	Manjeet Rathee	India	1
3	Jacob Whetton	Australia	1
3	Koji Yamasaki	Japan	1

=== Women's team ===
Rank	Player	Nationality	Goals
1	Sangita Kumari	India	2
2	Deepika Sehrawat	India	1

== Performance record ==
Season	Team	Standing	Result	Matches	Won	Draw	Lost	Shootout		Most Goals
Season	Team	Standing	Result	Matches	Won	Draw	Lost	W	L	Most Goals
2024–25	M	8/8	8th	10	0	4	6	1	3	Tomás Domene
2024–25	W	4/4	4th	6	1	1	4	1	0	Sangita Kumari
2025–26	M									
2025–26	W	1/4	Winners	7	3	3	1	1	2	Navneet Kaur
Champions x1

== See also ==
- Ahmedabad SG Pipers
