= Uttam Singh (field hockey) =

Indian field hockey player (born 2002)

Personal information
- Born: 12 October 2002 (age 23) Karampur, Ghazipur district, Uttar Pradesh

Sport
- Sport: Field hockey
- Position: Forward
Senior career
Years	Team	Caps	Goals
–	Uttar Pradesh	-	-
–	Tamil Nadu Dragons	-	-
National team
Years	Team	Caps	Goals
2019–2023	India U21	35	(19)
2022–	India	16	(6)
2024–	India Hockey5s	6	(6)
Medal record
Men's field hockey
Representing India
Asia Cup
Bronze medal – third place	2022 Jakarta
Asian Champions Trophy
Gold medal – first place	2024 Hulunbuir
Junior Asia Cup
Gold medal – first place	2023 Salalah

Uttam Singh (born 12 October 2002) is an Indian field hockey player from Uttar Pradesh. He made his senior India debut in the Hero Asia Cup 2022 held at Jakarta in June 2022. He plays for Uttar Pradesh in the domestic tournaments and for Tamil Nadu Dragons in the Hero Hockey India League 2024.

== Early life and education ==
Singh is from Karampur, Ghazipur district, Uttar Pradesh. His father Krishnakant Singh is a farmer. He learnt his basics at Karampur stadium and moved to Ludhiana Hockey Academy to improve his game.

== Career ==
Singh made his international debut with the junior India team that played the 2019 Sultan of Johor Cup and went on to lead the junior team. In December 2021, he captained the Indian under-21 team that played the FIH Odisha Hockey Men's Junior World Cup Bhubaneswar 2021 and scored five goals in the event. He then made his senior India debut in 2022 Asia Cup in Jakarta where he scored 2 goals. He also led the team to win the 2022 Sultan of Johor Cup beating Australia in the final. In 2023, he captained Indian team in the Men's Junior Asia Cup in June, 2023 Sultan of Johor Cup in November and 2023 FIH Junior World Cup in December. He represented Indian hockey5s team at the inaugural 2024 Men's FIH Hockey5s World Cup.
