= Jugraj Singh (field hockey, born 1996) =

Indian field hockey player

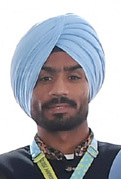
- Singh in 2022

Personal information
- Born: 11 December 1996 (age 29) Attari, Punjab, India

Sport
- Sport: Field hockey
- Position: Defender
Senior career
Years	Team	Caps	Goals
2024–	Rarh Bengal Tigers	-	-
National team
Years	Team	Caps	Goals
2022–	India	122	(45)
2023–	India Hockey5s	7	(5)
Medal record
Men's field hockey
Representing India
Asian Games
Gold medal – first place	2026 Aichi-Nagoya	Team
Commonwealth Games
Silver medal – second place	2022 Birmingham	Team
Asia Cup
Gold medal – first place	2025 Rajgir
Asian Champions Trophy
Gold medal – first place	2023 Chennai
Gold medal – first place	2024 Hulunbuir
Gold medal – first place	2026 Punjab
Hockey5s Asia Cup
Gold medal – first place	2023 Salalah

Jugraj Singh (born 11 December 1996) is an Indian field hockey player who plays as a defender for the Indian national team.
