= Beauty Dungdung =

Indian hockey player

Personal information
- Born: 21 July 2003 (age 23) Karangaguri, Simdega, Jharkhand, India

Sport
- Sport: Field hockey
- Position: Forward
Senior career
Years	Team	Caps	Goals
–	Hockey Jharkhand	-	-
–	Indian Oil Corporation Ltd	-	-
2025–	Rarh Bengal Tigers	-	-
National team
Years	Team	Caps	Goals
2019–2024	India U21	19	(2)
2022–	India	45	(6)
Medal record
Women's field hockey
Representing India
Asian Games
Gold medal – first place	2026 Aichi–Nagoya	Team
Asia Cup
Silver medal – second place	2025 Hangzhou
Asian Champions Trophy
Gold medal – first place	2024 Rajgir
FIH Nations Cup
Gold medal – first place	2022 Spain
Junior Asia Cup
Gold medal – first place	2024 Muscat

Beauty Dungdung (born 21 July 2003) is a field hockey player and member of Indian women hockey team. She plays for Indian Oil Corporation Limited in the domestic hockey tournaments. She plays in the forward line.

== Early life ==
Beauty Dungdung hails from Karangaguri village, in the tribal district of Simdega in Jharkhand. She is born to Ambrose and Nilima. She has three brothers, Juwel, Shakti and Sachin, all were hockey players. Her father and grandfather Gulm Dungdung were National level hockey players. She studied at the SS Balika High School at Simdega.

== Hockey career ==
Dungdung made her Senior India debut at the FIH Nations Cup in Valencia, Spain in December 2022. Earlier, she was part of the India U21 team that took part in the 2022 Junior World Cup, Potchefstroom, South Africa where India finished fourth. Dungdung first caught the eye as an under-14 player in 2016. Pratima Barwa was one of the first coaches that taught basics to Dungdung at Simdega sports hostel which is run by Jharkhand state government. In 2019, she first made her debut for the junior India team that took part in the Chile tour. She scored four goals including a hat-trick and was picked up for the 2022 Women's FIH Junior World Cup. Later, she was named as the captain for the Under-23 5-Nations Tournament in Ireland, where she was adjudged as the 'Best Player' of the tournament.
