= Karthi Selvam =

Indian field hockey player

Personal information
- Born: 1 September 2001 (age 24) Ariyalur, Tamil Nadu, India

Sport
- Sport: Field hockey
- Position: Forward
National team
| Years | Team | Caps | Goals |
| 2018–2022 | India U21 | | - |
| 2022– | India | 38 | (13) |
Medal record
Men's field hockey
Representing India
Asia Cup
| Bronze medal – third place | 2022 Jakarta |
Asian Champions Trophy
| Gold medal – first place | 2023 Chennai |
- Updated on 8 June 2022

Karthi Selvam (born 1 September 2001) is an Indian field hockey player who plays as a forward. He was a member of the India national team that played in the 2022 Asia Cup.

== Early life ==
Karthi hails from Ariyalur, a town in the Indian State of Tamil Nadu. His father Selvam works as a security guard at a government-run college. Karthi is the second of three children.

Karthi trained as a hockey player at the Sports Hostel for Excellence in Kovilpatti, which functioned under Sports Development Authority, the official sports organ of the government of Tamil Nadu. As of 2022, he was student at the SS Duraisamy Mariammal Arts College near Kovilpatti pursuing his graduation.

== Career ==
In 2018, Karthi was included in the India national under-21 team after a series of good performances for Tamil Nadu in the Junior National Championships. In May 2022, he was named in India's squad for the Asia Cup. Alongside Mareeswaran Sakthivel, he was the first to be selected for the Indian national team from Tamil Nadu in 13 years. Karthi scored on debut in the opening match against Pakistan in the 9th minute. The match ended in a 1–1 draw. India finished third defeating Japan 1–0.
