= Araijeet Singh Hundal =

Indian field hockey player

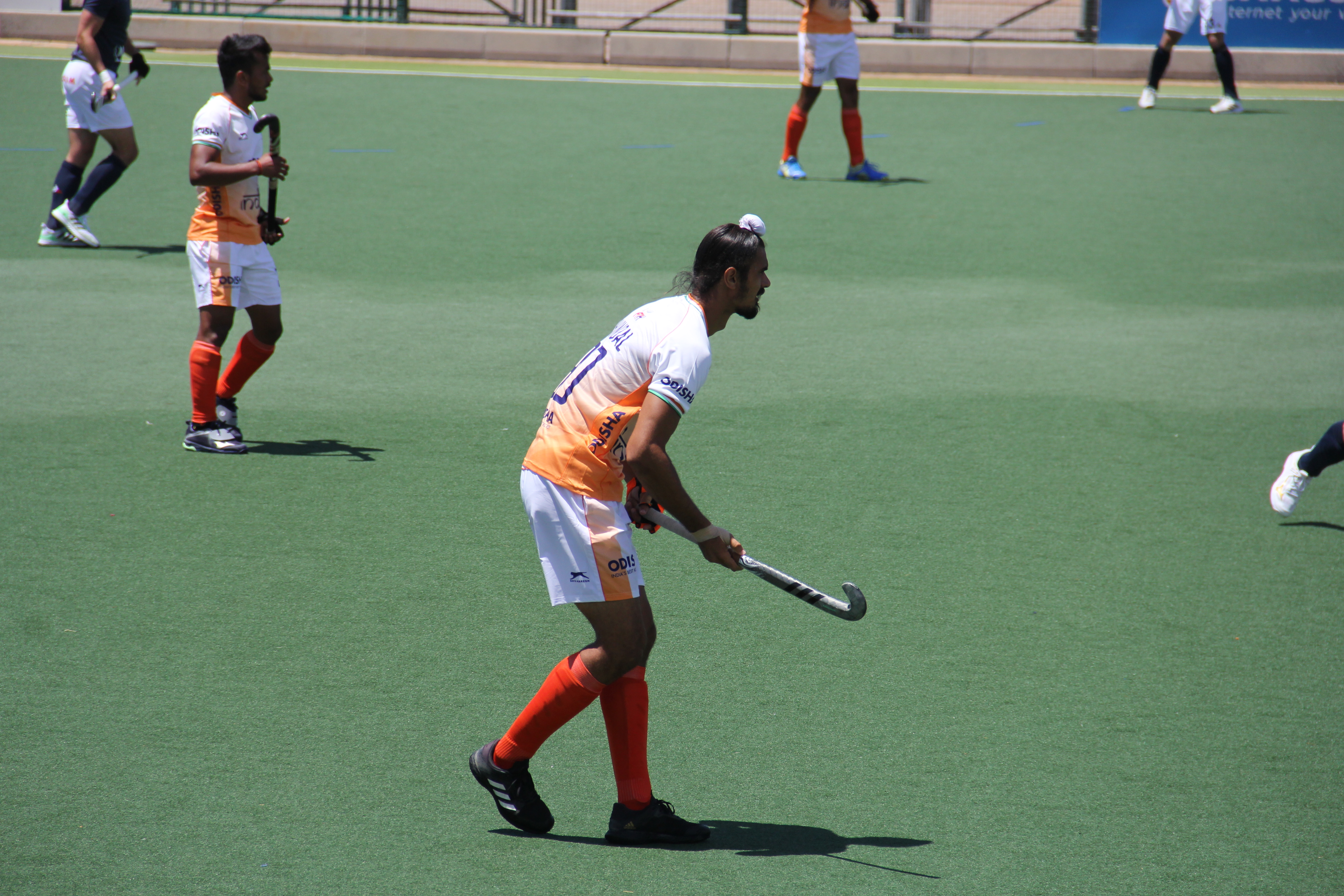

Personal information
- Born: 21 January 2004 (age 22) Punjab, India
- Height: 1.91 m (6 ft 3 in)

Sport
- Sport: Field hockey
- Position: Forward
Senior career
Years	Team	Caps	Goals
–	Punjab and Sind Bank	-	-
2024–	Team Gonasika	-	-
National team
Years	Team	Caps	Goals
2021–2025	India U21	28	(21)
2024–	India	27	(5)
Medal record
Men's field hockey
Representing India
Asian Champions Trophy
Gold medal – first place	2024 Hulunbuir
Junior Asia Cup
Gold medal – first place	2023 Salalah
Gold medal – first place	2024 Muscat

Araijeet Singh Hundal (born 21 January 2004) is an Indian field hockey player who plays as a forward. He plays for the India hockey team and specializes in drag flicks. In domestic leagues, he plays for Punjab and Sind Bank and for Team Gonasika.

== Early life and education ==
He hails from Punjab. He is a student of Bachelor of Arts. He comes from a family of hockey players and is a third generation hockey player. His grandfather was instrumental in starting hockey in his village.

== Career ==
He was part of the Indian team that came fourth in the Junior World Cup Bhubaneshwar in 2021. He made his debut in the Indian senior team at the 2023–24 Men's FIH Pro League and scored some important drag flick goals. He also scored in the comeback win against the Netherlands in the Junior World Cup in December 2023. Earlier, he scored a hat-trick in the first match against South Korea.

== Awards and nominations ==
Year	Award	Category	Result	Ref.
2025	Hockey India Awards	Upcoming Player of the Year Male	Won	
