= Affan Yousuf =

Indian field hockey player (born 1994)

Personal information
- Born: 29 December 1994 (age 31) Bhopal, Madhya Pradesh, India

Sport
- Sport: Field hockey
- Position: Forward
National team
Years	Team	Caps	Goals
2014-present	India		-
Medal record
Men's field hockey
Representing India
Asian Champions Trophy
Gold medal – first place	2016 Kuantan
- Updated on 8 November 2016

Affan Yousuf (born 29 December 1994) is an Indian field hockey player who plays as a forward. He was part of the Indian squad that won the 2016 Asian Men's Hockey Champions Trophy. His father Mohammed Yousuf, grandfather Khuda Dad and uncle Sameer Dad all represented India in field hockey.

It was the experience of watching his dad play hockey that inspired him to take up the game.
