= Arshdeep Singh (field hockey) =

Indian field hockey player (born 2004)

Personal information
- Born: 10 October 2004 (age 22) Leharka, Punjab, India

Sport
- Sport: Field hockey
- Position: Forward
- Club: Hockey Punjab
Senior career
Years	Team	Caps	Goals
–	Roundglass Punjab Club	-	-
–	Hockey Punjab	-	-
National team
Years	Team	Caps	Goals
2024–2025	India U21	17	(9)
2025–	India	2	(0)
Medal record
Men's field hockey
Representing India
Junior World Cup
Bronze medal – third place	2025 Tamil Nadu
Junior Asia Cup
Gold medal – first place	2024 Muscat

Arshdeep Singh (born 10 October 2004) is an Indian field hockey player. He plays for the Indian national team as a forward. He is registered with the Railway Sports Promotion Board, Roundglass Punjab Hockey Club and Hockey Punjab in the domestic tournaments and Hyderabad Toofans in the Hockey India League.

== Early life and career ==
Singh is from Leharka, near Amritsar, Punjab. His father is a farmer. He is doing his graduation at Lyallpur Khalsa College, Jalandhar. He started with Malwa Hockey Academy in Ludhiana before joining the Roundglass Punjab Hockey Club Academy. His brother Yugraj Singh, also a hockey player, encouraged him to play hockey.

== Career ==
Singh is selected for the National camp ahead of the FIH Pro League 2024–2025. He was in the Indian junior team that toured Europe from 18 to 31 May 2024. He is also part of the Indian team that won the Junior Asia Hoceky Cup at Muscat, Oman. Earlier, he played the 2024 Sultan of Johor Cup at Johor Bahru, Malaysia, where the Indian team won a bronze medal.
