= 2017 Ranchi Rays season =

Ranchi Rays
2017 season
- Coach: Harendra Singh
- Manager: Sumit Seth
- Stadium: Astroturf Hockey Stadium
- Hockey India League: 5th
- Top goalscorer: Ashley Jackson; Manpreet Singh (3 each)
- Biggest win: 7–2 (vs Kalinga Lancers, 26 January)
- Biggest defeat: 0–7 (vs Punjab Warriors, 1 February)
Home and away colours
- All statistics correct as of 1 February 2017.

The 2017 season is Ranchi Rays' third season in the Hockey India League. The season covers the period from 21 January to 26 February 2017.

== League ==
The fixtures for 2017 season were drawn on 22 November 2016. Playing their first game of the season against Dabang Mumbai, Rays secured a 3–3 in the away game. Christopher Rühr played roles in both goals for Rays, in the form of an assist to Simranjeet Singh in the first and a penalty shoot conversion in the second, thereby taking the team to a 3–1 lead before Mumbai equalised in the final minute with a field goal. Rays lost their second game to Kalinga Lancers away with a 2–4 margin, with Sarvanjit Singh scoring the lone goal, a field goal, in the 53rd minute after Lancers scored two field goals. Hosting Lancers at home, Rays earned a revenge win in the form of a 7–2 victory. Jackson converted Rays' second penalty into a goal from Manpreet Singh's injection, following Trent Mitton's miss in the 17th minute. Mohammad Amir Khan successfully deflected Sumit's pass into the post in the 30th minute giving his team a 3–0 lead, before Rühr converted Jackson's pass into a goal in the 31st minute. Rays' final goal came in the 44th minute after Manpreet Singh scored through a gap following an assist from Gurbaj Singh. Rays played their next game against Delhi Waveriders at home to a goalless draw. They failed to convert a penalty corner into a goal and were also successful in fending off two of Waveriders' attempts.

Playing at home, Rays lost to Punjab Warriors by a 0–7 margin in their next game on 1 February. Despite having created many chances at goal including nine penalty corners, they failed to convert any. They played their next game against Dabang Mumbai the next day at home. Jackson deflected a Manpreet Singh-pass in the fifth minute into the goal to equal Mumbai's second minute field goal to 2–2. Mohammad Amir Khan then tapped a rebound from a shot from Flynn Ogilvie in the 16th minute to go 4–2. A 49th-minute penalty stroke conversion by Jackson took Rays' lead to 5–3, before Imran Khan scored in the 57th minute assisted by Simranjeet Singh, taking the lead to 7–3. Captain Jackson was handed a yellow card after his team was found playing 12 members in the field. In their final away game of the season, Rays played Uttar Pradesh Wizards to a goalless draw.

Date	Opponents	H / A	Result F–A	Scorers
21 January	Dabang Mumbai	A	3–3	Si. Singh 32', Rühr 39'
23 January	Kalinga Lancers	A	2–4	Sa. Singh 53'
26 January	Kalinga Lancers	H	7–2	Jackson 24', Khan 30', Rühr 31', M. Singh 44'
28 January	Delhi Waveriders	H	0–0	
1 February	Punjab Warriors	H	0–7	
2 February	Dabang Mumbai	H	7–3	Jackson (2) 5', 49', MA Khan 16', I. Khan 57'
4 February	Uttar Pradesh Wizards	H	0–0	
9 February	Punjab Warriors	A	0–1	
16 February	Uttar Pradesh Wizards	A	0–4	
21 February	Delhi Waveriders	A	6–2	Manpreet Singh (2) 9', 32', I. Khan 37'

=== Points table ===
Pos	Team	Pld	W	D	L	GF	GA	GD	Pts	Qualification
1	Dabang Mumbai (Q)	10	6	2	2	40	32	+8	35	Advanced to Semi-finals
2	Kalinga Lancers (Q)	10	5	1	4	32	40	−8	28	Advanced to Semi-finals
3	Uttar Pradesh Wizards (Q)	10	3	4	3	31	22	+9	25	Advanced to Semi-finals
4	Delhi Waveriders (Q)	10	3	2	5	29	23	+6	23	Advanced to Semi-finals
5	Ranchi Rays (E)	10	3	3	4	25	26	−1	23	
6	Punjab Warriors (E)	10	4	0	6	25	39	−14	22	

Source: Official website
Rules for classification: 1) Points (Win (5) Draw (2) Lost by 3 goals (1) or (0) 2) matches won 3) goal difference 4) goals scored 5) head-to-head points, goal difference & goals scored 6) shoot‐out competition
(E) Eliminated; (Q) Qualified for semi-finals

== Team ==
Prior to the players' auction held in November 2016, the franchise of Rays retained a majority of their players from the previous season and made only two new signings. Gurbaj Singh was bought for US$99,000, the highest in the league, and Christopher Rühr for US$75,000, another expensive signing, the highest for a foreign player.

== Squad statistics ==
No.	Pos.	Name	League		Discipline	
No.	Pos.	Name	Apps	Goals	Yellow card	Red card
1	GK	(Australia) Tyler Lovell	10	0	0	0
3	DF	(India) Vikramjit Singh	0(10)	0	0	0
6	MF	(India) Kothajit Singh	10	0	1	0
7	MF	(India) Manpreet Singh	10	3	0	0
8	MF	(England) Ashley Jackson	10	3	1	0
9	FW	(India) Imran Khan	1(9)	2	0	0
10	FW	(India) Sarvanjit Singh	7(3)	1	0	0
11	MF	(Australia) Trent Mitton	4(6)	0	0	0
13	MF	(India) Gurbaj Singh	10	0	0	0
16	MF	(India) Sumit	5(5)	0	1	0
17	FW	(Germany) Christopher Rühr	6(2)	2	0	0
18	MF	(England) Barry Middleton	10	0	0	0
19	DF	(Australia) Tim Deavin	0(10)	0	1	0
20	FW	(India) Sumit Kumar	1(8)	0	0	0
22	FW	(India) Mohammad Amir Khan	5(5)	2	0	0
24	MF	(India) Simranjeet Singh	4(6)	1	0	0
25	GK	(India) Akash Chikte	0(4)	0	0	0
26	DF	(India) Birendra Lakra	7(3)	0	0	0
30	MF	(Australia) Flynn Ogilvie	0(10)	0	0	0
31	DF	(Australia) Fergus Kavanagh	10	0	0	0
