= List of India international field hockey players =

This is a list of field hockey players who have appeared for the India men's national field hockey team.

== List ==
Player	Pos	Date of birth	From	Caps	Notes
Mukesh Kumar	DF	16 April 1970	Hyderabad, Telangana		
Baljit Singh Saini	DF	12 August 1976	Ropar, Punjab		
Dilip Tirkey	DF	25 November 1977	Sundergarh, Odisha		
Len Aiyappa	DF	31 March 1979	Kodagu, Karnataka		
Bimal Lakra	MF	4 May 1980	Simdega, Jharkhand		
Prabhjot Singh	FW	14 August 1980	Jalandhar, Punjab		
Viren Rasquinha	MF	13 September 1980	Mumbai, Maharashtra		
Gagan Ajit Singh	FW	9 December 1980	Ferozepur, Punjab		
Arjun Halappa	FW	13 December 1980	Kodagu, Karnataka		
Deepak Thakur	FW	28 December 1980	Hoshiarpur, Punjab		
Ignace Tirkey	DF	10 May 1981	Sundergarh, Odisha		
Vikram Pillay	MF	17 November 1981	Pune, Maharashtra		
Devesh Chauhan	GK	11 December 1981	Etawah, Uttar Pradesh		
Bharat Chettri	GK	15 December 1981	Kalimpong, West Bengal		
Kanwalpreet Singh	DF	28 December 1981	Jalandhar, Punjab		
Jugraj Singh	DF	22 April 1983	Amritsar, Punjab		
Shivendra Singh	FW	9 June 1983	Gwalior, Madhya Pradesh		
Rajpal Singh	MF	8 August 1983	Chandigarh		
Harpal Singh	DF	11 October 1983	Sirsa, Haryana		
Adam Sinclair	FW	29 February 1984	Coimbatore, Tamil Nadu		
Adrian D'Souza	GK	24 March 1984	Mumbai, Maharashtra		
William Xalco	DF	14 June 1984	Sundergarh, Odisha		
Prabodh Tirkey	MF	6 October 1984	Sundergarh, Odisha		
Dhananjay Mahadik	DF	5 November 1984	Mumbai, Maharashtra		
Tushar Khandker	FW	5 April 1985	Jhansi, Uttar Pradesh		
Sandeep Michael	FW	23 June 1985	Bangalore, Karnataka		
Bharat Chikara	MF	10 October 1985	Jhajjar, Haryana		
V. S. Vinaya	MF	24 November 1985	Kodagu, Karnataka		
Sandeep Singh	DF	27 February 1986	Shahabad, Haryana		
P. R. Sreejesh	GK	8 May 1986	Ernakulam, Kerala		
Sardar Singh	MF	15 July 1986	Sirsa, Haryana		
Vickram Kanth	DF	11 April 1987	Kodagu, Karnataka		
Roshan Minz	FW	21 October 1987	Sundergarh, Odisha		
Sarvanjit Singh	FW	7 March 1988	Gurdaspur, Punjab		
Gurbaj Singh	MF	9 August 1988	Ferozepur, Punjab		
V. R. Raghunath	DF	1 November 1988	Kodagu, Karnataka		
Nithin Thimmaiah	FW	8 December 1988	Kodagu, Karnataka		
Danish Mujtaba	FW	20 December 1988	Allahabad, Uttar Pradesh		
S. V. Sunil	FW	6 May 1989	Kodagu, Karnataka		
Gurwinder Singh Chandi	FW	20 October 1989	Jalandhar, Punjab		
Mandeep Antil	FW	10 November 1989	Sonipat, Haryana		
Yuvraj Walmiki	MF	29 November 1989	Mumbai, Maharashtra		
Jasjit Singh Kular	DF	30 December 1989	Jalandhar, Punjab		
Birendra Lakra	DF	3 February 1990	Simdega, Jharkhand		
Harbir Singh Sandhu	DF	27 March 1990	Amritsar, Punjab		
Dharamvir Singh	FW	5 August 1990	Ropar, Punjab		
Rupinder Pal Singh	DF	11 November 1990	Faridkot, Punjab		
Nikkin Thimmaiah	FW	18 January 1991	Kodagu, Karnataka		
Chinglensana Singh	MF	2 December 1991	Imphal East, Manipur		
Devindar Walmiki	MF	28 May 1992	Mumbai, Maharashtra		
Pardeep Mor	DF	2 June 1992	Narwana, Haryana		
Manpreet Singh	MF	26 June 1992	Jalandhar, Punjab		
Akash Chikte	GK	24 July 1992	Yavatmal, Maharashtra		
Kothajit Singh	MF	17 August 1992	Imphal East, Manipur		
Gurmail Singh	DF	30 December 1992	Sirsa, Haryana		
Malak Singh	MF	30 December 1992	Sirsa, Haryana		
Ramandeep Singh	FW	1 April 1993	Gurdaspur, Punjab		
Amit Rohidas	DF	10 May 1993	Sundergarh, Odisha		
Satbir Singh	MF	22 October 1993	Gurdaspur, Punjab		
Surender Kumar	DF	23 November 1993	Karnal, Haryana		
Lalit Upadhyay	FW	1 December 1993	Varanasi, Uttar Pradesh		
S. K. Uthappa	MF	2 December 1993	Kodagu, Karnataka		
Mohammad Amir Khan	FW	29 December 1993	Allahabad, Uttar Pradesh		
Talwinder Singh	FW	1 January 1994	Jalandhar, Punjab		
Harjot Singh	GK	26 January 1994	Amloh, Punjab		
Gurjinder Singh	DF	1 April 1994	Gurdaspur, Punjab		
Akashdeep Singh	FW	2 December 1994	Tarn Taran, Punjab		
Affan Yousuf	FW	29 December 1994	Bhopal, Madhya Pradesh		
Armaan Qureshi	FW	1 January 1995	Gwalior, Madhya Pradesh		
Gurinder Singh	DF	1 January 1995	Ropar, Punjab		
Mandeep Singh	FW	25 January 1995	Jalandhar, Punjab		
Gurjant Singh	FW	26 January 1995	Amritsar, Punjab		
Nilakanta Sharma	MF	2 May 1995	Imphal East, Manipur		
Vikas Dahiya	GK	8 May 1995	Sonipat, Haryana		
Varun Kumar	DF	25 July 1995	Jalandhar, Punjab		
Suraj Karkera	GK	14 October 1995	Mumbai, Maharashtra		
Harjeet Singh	MF	2 January 1996	Tarn Taran, Punjab		
Harmanpreet Singh	DF	6 January 1996	Amritsar, Punjab		
Sumit	MF	20 December 1996	Sonipat, Haryana		
Simranjeet Singh	MF	27 December 1996	Batala, Punjab		
Krishan Pathak	GK	24 April 1997	Kapurthala, Punjab		
Dipsan Tirkey	DF	15 October 1998	Sundergarh, Odisha		
Nilam Sanjeep Xess	DF	7 November 1998	Sundergarh, Odisha		
Dilpreet Singh	FW	12 November 1999	Amritsar, Punjab		
Vivek Prasad	MF	25 February 2000	Hoshangabad, Madhya Pradesh		
