= 2016 Ranchi Rays season =

Ranchi Rays
2016 season
- Coach: Harendra Singh
- Manager: Sumit Seth
- Stadium: Astroturf Hockey Stadium
- Hockey India League: 1st
- Top goalscorer: Ashley Jackson (9)
- Biggest win: 4–2 (vs Uttar Pradesh Wizards, 22 January 2016)
- Biggest defeat: 4–7 (vs Delhi Waveriders, 11 February 2016)

The 2016 season is Ranchi Rays' second season in the Hockey India League. The season covers the period from 18 January to 21 February 2016. The season saw the introduction of a new rule according to which weightage for field goals was double compared to the goals scored from penalty corners, meaning a field goal will count as two while successfully converted short corner will still be considered as one goal.

== League ==
The fixtures for 2016 season were drawn on 6 January 2016. Ranchi Rays began their campaign on 19 January with a 2–0 loss away to Punjab Warriors. In its second game on 22 January, Rays registered an away win against Uttar Pradesh Wizards. After a 15th minute field goal by Wizards giving the team a 2–0 lead, Rays scored its first goal in the 45th minute after Sarvanjit Singh converted a penalty corner into a goal. Jackson followed it up with a field goal with an assist provided by Barry Middleton in the 48th minute and a 60th-minute goal with a penalty corner conversion, and the team finished 4–2. Playing its first home game on 26 January, Rays beat Delhi Waveriders 2–1 that included another brace by Jackson, converting penalty corners in the 29th and 31st minute. Playing then table-toppers Kalinga Lancers at home, dubbed the 'Eastern derby', Rays were down 0–1 in the 33rd minute, and came from behind with a penalty conversion by Jackson in the 39th minute and a field goal by Tim Deavin in the 48th minute to win the game 3–1. With the win, Rays replaced Lancers at the top of the table. In its second game against Punjab Warriors, playing at home, Rays were down 0–2 in the 7th minute. Field goals from Kothajit Singh in the 18th minute and Daniel Beale in the 28th minute saw them go 4–2 up. After another field goal from Warriors, Sandeep Singh of Rays converted a penalty in the 43rd minute after coming in as a substitute, to win the game 5–4.

Playing Dabang Mumbai away on 3 February, Rays scored the equalizing goal to make 1–1 in the 18th minute. Jackson scored his second goal for Rays with a penalty conversion to go 4–3 up in the 41st minute. In the same minute, Mumbai scored a field goal to go 5–3 up. Despite a Sandeep Singh penalty conversion in the 59th minute, the match went in Mumbai's favour 7–5. Playing table-leaders Kalinga Lancers again, now away, Rays were down 0–2 in the 9th minute. For Rays, Jackson converted a penalty corner the next minute, and with a 49th minute field goal by Mohammad Amir Khan, they finished the game winning 3–2, and in the process again upstaged Lancers at the top of the table with a total of 27 points off 7 games to the latter's 23 off 8. Playing Delhi Waveriders in its final away game, Rays were down 0–5 by the 19th-minute. With field goals from Jackson and Trent Mitton, the game ended at 7–4 in Waveriders' favour. Rays could convert none of its eight penalty corner chances into goals.

Date	Opponents	H / A	Result F–A	Scorers
19 January	Punjab Warriors	A	0–2	
22 January	Uttar Pradesh Wizards	A	4–2	Sar. Singh 45', Jackson (2) 48', 60'
26 January	Delhi Waveriders	H	2–1	Jackson (2) 29', 31'
28 January	Kalinga Lancers	H	3–1	Jackson 39', Deavin 48'
30 January	Punjab Warriors	H	5–4	K. Singh 18', Daniel Beale 28', San. Singh 43'
3 February	Dabang Mumbai	H	5–7	Jackson (2) 18', 41', Sar. Singh 38', San. Singh 59'
8 February	Kalinga Lancers	A	3–2	Jackson 9', Khan 49'
11 February	Delhi Waveriders	A	4–7	Jackson 35', Mitton 50'
13 February	Uttar Pradesh Wizards	H	Report	

=== Points Table ===
As of matches played on 8 February 2016.

Team	Pld	W	D	L	GF	GA	GD	Pts
Ranchi Rays	7	5	0	2	22	20	2	27
Kalinga Lancers	8	4	0	4	35	26	9	23
Punjab Warriors	7	4	0	3	22	17	5	22
Uttar Pradesh Wizards	7	3	0	4	23	29	–6	18
Delhi Waveriders	7	3	0	4	19	25	–6	17
Dabang Mumbai	6	2	0	4	19	23	-4	14
						Qualify for Semi-finals		

== Team ==
Prior to the players' auction held in September 2015, the franchise of Rays retained six of its players — Manpreet Singh, Birendra Lakra, Kothajit Singh, Ashley Jackson, Barry Middleton and Fergus Kavanagh — from the 2015 season. At the auctions, 13 new players were signed to complete the fixed squad of 20.

Pos.	Name	Fee
DF	(India) Vikramjit Singh	$4,500
GK	(India) Akash Chikte	$4,500
FW	(India) Imran Khan	$7,000
MF	(India) Simranjeet Singh	$8,000
MF	(India) Sumit Kumar	$15,000
MF	(India) Sumit	$71,000
DF	(India) Sandeep Singh	$81,000
FW	(India) Sarvanjit Singh	$6,000
FW	(India) Mohammad Amir Khan	$10,500
MF	(Australia) Flynn Ogilvie	$10,000
GK	(Australia) Tyler Lovell	$30,000
MF	(Australia) Daniel Beale	$26,000
DF	(Australia) Tim Deavin	$29,000
MF	(Australia) Trent Mitton	$20,000

== Squad statistics ==
No.	Pos.	Name	League		Discipline	
No.	Pos.	Name	Apps	Goals	Yellow card	Red card
1	GK	(Australia) Tyler Lovell	4	0	0	0
3	DF	(India) Vikramjit Singh	2(2)	0	0	0
4	DF	(India) Sandeep Singh	2(1)	0	0	0
6	MF	(India) Kothajit Singh	4	0	0	0
7	MF	(India) Manpreet Singh	4	0	0	0
8	MF	(England) Ashley Jackson	4	5	0	0
9	FW	(India) Imran Khan	4(4)	0	0	0
10	FW	(India) Sarvanjit Singh	4	1	0	0
11	MF	(Australia) Trent Mitton	4	0	0	0
16	MF	(India) Sumit	4(1)	0	0	0
17	MF	(England) Barry Middleton	4	0	0	0
19	DF	(Australia) Tim Deavin	4(4)	1	0	0
20	MF	(India) Sumit Kumar	4(4)	0	0	0
22	FW	(India) Mohammad Amir Khan	4	0	0	0
23	MF	(Australia) Daniel Beale	4(4)	0	0	0
24	MF	(India) Simranjeet Singh	4(4)	0	0	0
25	GK	(India) Akash Chikte	1(1)	0	0	0
26	DF	(India) Birendra Lakra	4	0	0	0
30	MF	(Australia) Flynn Ogilvie	4(4)	0	0	0
31	DF	(Australia) Fergus Kavanagh	4	0	0	0
