= Amit Rohidas =

Indian field hockey player

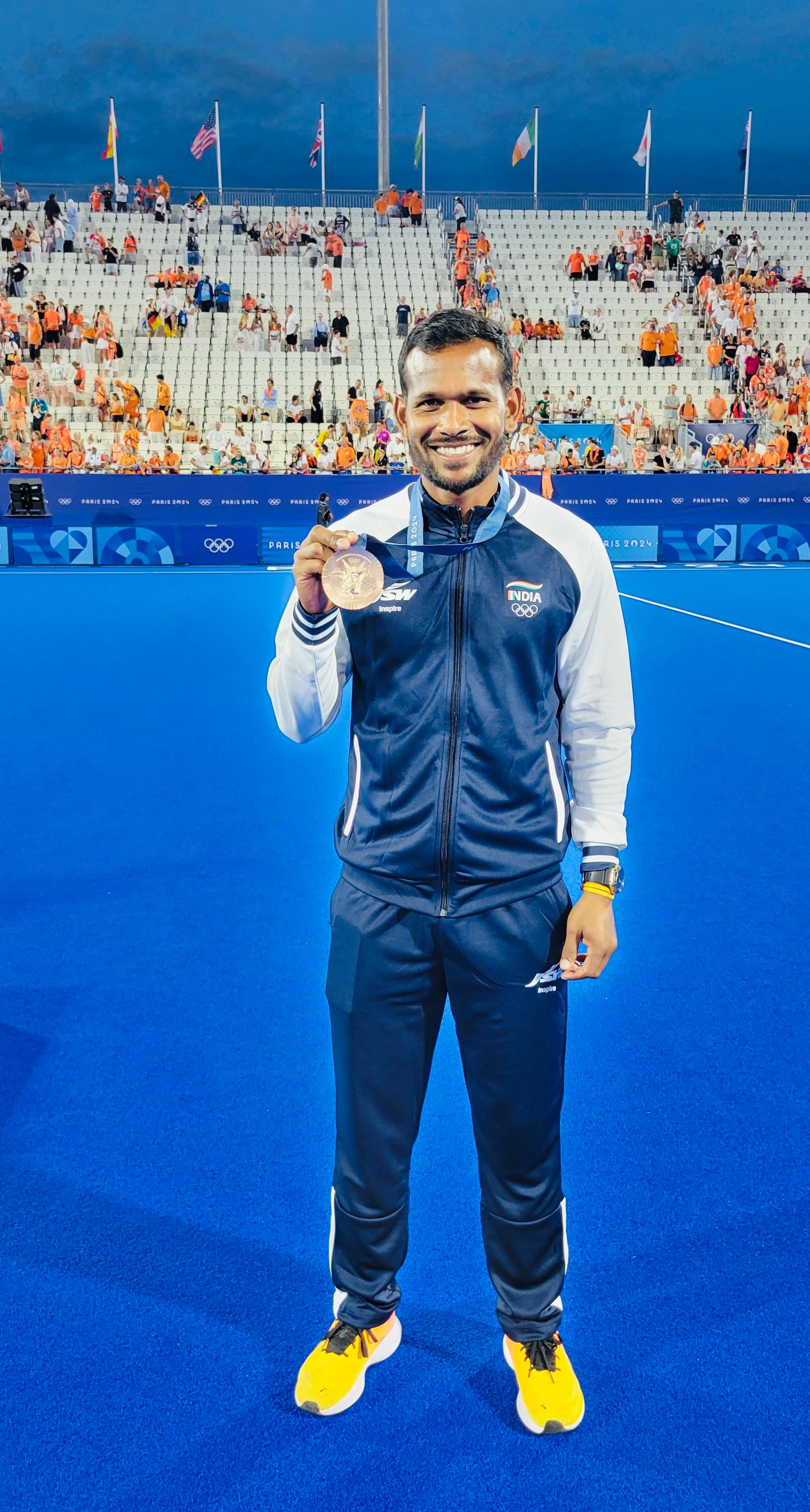

Personal information
- Born: 10 May 1993 (age 33) Saunamara, Sundergarh, Odisha, India
- Height: 1.79 m (5 ft 10 in)

Sport
- Sport: Field hockey
- Position: Defender
Senior career
Years	Team	Caps	Goals
–	Petroleum Sports Promotion Board	-	-
–	Railways	-	-
–	Hockey Association of Odisha	-	-
2024–	Tamil Nadu Dragons	-	-
National team
Years	Team	Caps	Goals
2013	India U21	22	(8)
2013–	India	264	(38)
Medal record
Men's field hockey
Representing India
Olympic Games
Bronze medal – third place	2020 Tokyo	Team
Bronze medal – third place	2024 Paris	Team
World League
Bronze medal – third place	2016–17 Bhubaneswar	Team
Champions Trophy
Silver medal – second place	2018 Breda
Commonwealth Games
Silver medal – second place	2022 Birmingham	Team
Asian Games
Gold medal – first place	2022 Hangzhou	Team
Gold medal – first place	2026 Aichi–Nagoya	Team
Bronze medal – third place	2018 Jakarta	Team
Asia Cup
Gold medal – first place	2017 Dhaka
Gold medal – first place	2025 Rajgir
Silver medal – second place	2013 Ipoh
Asian Champions Trophy
Gold medal – first place	2023 Chennai
Gold medal – first place	2024 Hulunbuir
Gold medal – first place	2026 Punjab
Junior Asia Cup
Bronze medal – third place	2012 Malacca

Amit Rohidas (born 10 May 1993) is an Indian field hockey player who plays as a defender for the India men's national field hockey team. Considered one of the finest defenders of his generation, he is renowned for his fearless first-rushing, tackling ability, aerial distribution and penalty corner defence. Rohidas has served as the vice-captain of the Indian national team and has represented India in the Olympic Games, FIH Hockey World Cup, Asian Games, Commonwealth Games, FIH Pro League and Asian Champions Trophy.

He played a pivotal role in India's resurgence on the international stage, winning bronze medals at the 2020 and 2024 Olympics, becoming one of the few Indian hockey players to win two Olympic medals. He was also part of the Indian team that won the gold medal at the 2022 Asian Games, earning direct qualification for the Paris Olympics.

== Early life ==
Born in Saunamara village in Odisha's Sundergarh district, Rohidas rose from humble beginnings to become one of India's most dependable defenders. Like many children in Sundargarh, Rohidas began playing hockey on village grounds using basic equipment. Recognising his talent, he joined the Panposh Sports Hostel in Rourkela in 2004, where he received structured coaching under Odisha's grassroots hockey development programme. Initially, he played as a forward, but his coaches soon recognised his defensive instincts and encouraged him to switch to the defender's role.

== International career ==
=== India Junior ===
Rohidas' first major breakthrough came in 2009, when he was selected for India's squad for the 2009 Men's U18 Asia Cup. Playing as a defender with attacking instincts, he scored seven goals during the tournament and was named the Player of the Tournament, attracting the attention of national selectors. His performances earned him regular opportunities with India's junior national programme. He subsequently represented India at the 2013 Men's Hockey Junior World Cup held in New Delhi, where he served as the vice-captain of the Indian team. Although India did not finish on the podium, Rohidas established himself as one of the country's brightest young defenders.

=== India Senior ===
Rohidas received his first call-up to the Indian senior men's hockey team in 2013, following impressive performances for the junior national team and in domestic hockey. He made his senior debut at the Sultan Azlan Shah Cup in Ipoh, Malaysia. His inclusion marked the beginning of his transition from junior prospect to international defender. Although India finished outside the medals, Rohidas impressed with his composure, tackling ability and work ethic. Later that year, Rohidas was selected for the 2013 Asia Cup, also held in Ipoh. India reached the final after an unbeaten run before losing 0–2 to South Korea, settling for the silver medal. The tournament was Rohidas' first major international championship and established him as one of India's emerging defenders.

Despite his promising debut season, Rohidas struggled to cement a regular place in the Indian squad over the next three years. Competition for defensive positions increased as India rebuilt its team under successive coaching regimes. The setbacks were personally challenging, but Rohidas continued to perform consistently in domestic hockey and the Hockey India League rather than leaving the sport. After nearly four years away from regular international hockey, Rohidas earned a recall to the Indian national team in 2017. Under Dutch coach Sjoerd Marijne, Rohidas quickly established himself as India's preferred central defender. His ability to execute long aerial passes, defend penalty corners and make timely interceptions complemented the team's increasingly attacking style. From 2017 onward, Rohidas became one of the first names on the Indian team sheet.

==== Early Breakthrough with Major Tournaments (2018) ====
Rohidas represented India at the 2018 Commonwealth Games in Gold Coast, Australia. India entered the tournament among the favourites but suffered a surprise semi-final defeat to New Zealand before losing the bronze medal match to England, finishing fourth. Despite the disappointing team result, Rohidas was widely praised for his defensive performances throughout the tournament. Rohidas was also a part of the Indian squad at the 2018 Men's Hockey Champions Trophy in Breda, where India finished as runners-up after losing to Australia in the final via a penalty shootout following a 1–1 draw. Later that year, Rohidas represented India at the 2018 Asian Games in Jakarta. India entered the competition as defending champions and favorites for the gold medal but were upset by Malaysia in the semi-finals via a penalty shootout. The team recovered to defeat Pakistan 2–1 in the bronze medal match. Rohidas played an important role in India's defence throughout the tournament and secured his first Asian Games medal.

The 2018 Men's Hockey World Cup, hosted in Bhubaneswar, marked Rohidas' first senior World Cup appearance. India topped Pool C after victories over South Africa and Canada and a draw against Belgium. In the quarter-finals, India suffered a narrow 1–2 defeat to the Netherlands, ending their campaign. Although the result disappointed Indian supporters, Rohidas emerged from the tournament as one of India's most dependable defenders.

==== Rise in the National Team and FIH Pro League (2019–2020) ====
Following the World Cup, Rohidas became a regular member of India's squad in the newly launched FIH Pro League. His consistency during the Pro League seasons made him indispensable in India's preparations for the Tokyo Olympics. By the end of 2019, Rohidas had firmly established himself as India's premier central defender. His role in the team extended beyond conventional defending. He became responsible for first rushing during opposition penalty corners, organising India's defensive structure, initiating attacks through aerial balls, neutralising opposition forwards, and mentoring younger defenders. Head coach Graham Reid, appointed in 2019, retained Rohidas as one of the cornerstones of India's defence. Under Reid's coaching, India's defensive record improved considerably in the lead-up to the Tokyo Olympics, with Rohidas playing a pivotal role.

==== Tokyo Olympics (2020) ====
The 2020 Summer Olympics, held in Tokyo in 2021 due to the COVID-19 pandemic, marked Rohidas' Olympic debut. India began the tournament with victories over New Zealand, Spain, Argentina, and Japan, finishing second in Pool A behind Australia. Rohidas played every match, forming an effective defensive partnership with Harmanpreet Singh and Surender Kumar while excelling as India's primary first rusher during opposition penalty corners. In the quarter-finals, India defeated Great Britain 3–1 to reach their first Olympic semi-final since 1980. Although India lost 2–5 to eventual champions Belgium in the semi-finals, the team bounced back with a historic 5–4 victory over Germany in the bronze medal match.

The victory ended India's 41-year wait for an Olympic hockey medal, the country's first since the 1980 Moscow Olympics. Rohidas delivered one of his finest performances, making several crucial defensive interventions under intense German pressure. His contribution was widely praised by teammates, coaches and the Indian media.

==== Post-Olympic Career and FIH Pro League Continuity (2021–2023) ====
Following the Olympic success, Rohidas continued to be a regular member of India's squad in the FIH Hockey Pro League, facing elite opposition throughout Europe and Oceania. His defensive consistency, particularly his work as a first rusher, became one of the defining features of India's playing style under Graham Reid and later Craig Fulton. By 2023, many analysts regarded Rohidas among the world's leading penalty-corner defenders because of his willingness to sprint directly at drag-flickers, a role demanding exceptional courage, anticipation and reflexes.

==== Commonwealth Games and Asian Games Success (2022) ====
Rohidas represented India at the 2022 Commonwealth Games in Birmingham, England. India reached the final after defeating South Africa in the semi-finals before facing Australia in the gold medal match. Australia retained the title with a 7–0 victory, while India secured the silver medal, their first Commonwealth Games silver since 2014. Rohidas played throughout the tournament and remained one of India's most reliable defenders despite Australia's dominance in the final.

The postponed 2022 Asian Games, held in Hangzhou, China, represented another major milestone in Rohidas' career. India dominated the tournament, winning all five group-stage matches before defeating South Korea in the semi-finals. In the final, India defeated Japan 5–1 to win the gold medal, earning direct qualification for the 2024 Paris Olympics. Rohidas played a crucial role in India's defence throughout the competition, helping the team concede only a handful of goals while maintaining its status as Asia's leading hockey nation.

==== Hockey World Cup (2023) ====
Rohidas represented India at the 2023 FIH Men's Hockey World Cup, jointly hosted by Bhubaneswar and Rourkela in Odisha. The tournament held special significance for Rohidas, as the newly inaugurated Birsa Munda International Hockey Stadium in Rourkela is located close to his hometown. India began strongly by defeating Spain before drawing with England and beating Wales. However, India lost to New Zealand in a penalty shootout during the crossover stage, ending its campaign earlier than expected. Despite the disappointing result, Rohidas remained one of India's standout defenders throughout the tournament.

By 2023, Rohidas had become one of the senior-most members of the Indian squad. Recognising his experience and leadership qualities, Hockey India appointed him vice-captain, assisting captain Harmanpreet Singh in leading the national team. His leadership was particularly evident in organising India's defensive structure and mentoring younger defenders entering the national setup.

==== Paris Olympics (2024) ====
Rohidas was selected in India's squad for the 2024 Summer Olympics in Paris, marking his second consecutive Olympic appearance. India advanced from the group stage after notable victories over New Zealand, Ireland, and Australia, along with a draw against Argentina. Rohidas again played a central role in India's defence.

During the quarter-final against Great Britain, Rohidas received a red card after his raised stick struck British forward Will Calnan in the face while attempting to control the ball. The dismissal forced India to play with ten players for more than 40 minutes, yet the team successfully held Great Britain to a draw before winning the penalty shootout 4–2. Following the match, Hockey India appealed the decision, arguing that there had been no deliberate intent. The appeal was unsuccessful, and Rohidas received a one-match suspension, ruling him out of the semi-final against Germany.

India narrowly lost the semi-final to Germany before defeating Spain 2–1 in the bronze medal match. Rohidas returned for the bronze medal match and delivered another commanding defensive performance, helping India secure its second consecutive Olympic bronze medal—the country's first back-to-back Olympic hockey medals since 1972.

== Domestic career ==
=== Hockey India League ===
The introduction of the Hockey India League (HIL) in 2013 proved to be a turning point in Rohidas' career. He joined Ranchi Rhinos for the inaugural season of the Hockey India League, helping the franchise win the 2013 HIL title. Playing alongside several international stars allowed Rohidas to refine his defensive skills and gain valuable experience against world-class opposition.

He later represented the Kalinga Lancers, contributing to their successful 2017 Hockey India League championship campaign. His performances in the league convinced the Indian selectors to recall him to the national side in 2017 after nearly three years away from regular international hockey. Following the suspension of the Hockey India League after 2017, Rohidas later reflected that the tournament had transformed his career, describing it as the platform that enabled him to return to the Indian national team after a difficult period outside the senior squad.

=== National Championships ===
Apart from the Hockey India League, Rohidas has represented several domestic teams, including the Petroleum Sports Promotion Board (PSPB) and the Hockey Association of Odisha in the Senior National Championships and other domestic competitions. In the revived Hockey India League beginning in 2024, he joined the Tamil Nadu Dragons.

== Playing Style ==
Amit Rohidas primarily plays as a central defender and is widely regarded as one of the finest defensive specialists in international hockey. Throughout his international career, he has been recognised for his composure under pressure, anticipation, strong tackling, aerial passing and leadership in defence. Unlike many modern defenders who primarily contribute through penalty corner drag-flicking, Rohidas built his reputation on traditional defensive skills and consistency.

One of Rohidas' defining responsibilities has been serving as India's first rusher during opposition penalty corners. The role requires a defender to sprint directly towards drag-flickers immediately after the injection, attempting to block shots that can exceed 140 km/h. It is considered one of the most dangerous positions in hockey because of the risk of serious injury.

Apart from his defensive work, Rohidas is also known for his accurate long aerial passes, which help India transition quickly from defence to attack. His ability to intercept attacks before they develop, combined with disciplined positioning, has made him one of India's most dependable defenders over the past decade.

== Awards and honours ==
=== International ===
- Summer Olympics
  - Bronze (2): Tokyo 2020, Paris 2024
- Asian Games
  - Gold (1): Hangzhou 2022
  - Bronze (1): Jakarta 2018
- Commonwealth Games
  - Silver (1): Birmingham 2022
- Hockey Asia Cup
  - Silver (1): Ipoh 2013
- Asian Champions Trophy
  - Gold (3): Muscat 2018, Chennai 2023, Hulunbuir 2024

=== Domestic ===
- Hockey India League
  - Kalinga Lancers
    - Winner (1): 2017
  - Ranchi Rays
    - Winner (1): 2013

=== Individual ===
- 2021
  - Arjuna Award, the second-highest sporting honour of India, by former President Ram Nath Kovind.
  - Biju Patnaik Sports Award, the highest state-level sporting honor in Odisha, for Outstanding Performance in Sports & Games
- 2025
  - Pargat Singh Award, for Defender of the Year at the Hockey India Annual Award 2024
- 2026
  - Hockey Player of the Year (Male), at the Times of India Sports Awards (TOISA) 2025.
