= S. K. Uthappa =

Indian professional field hockey player (born 1993)

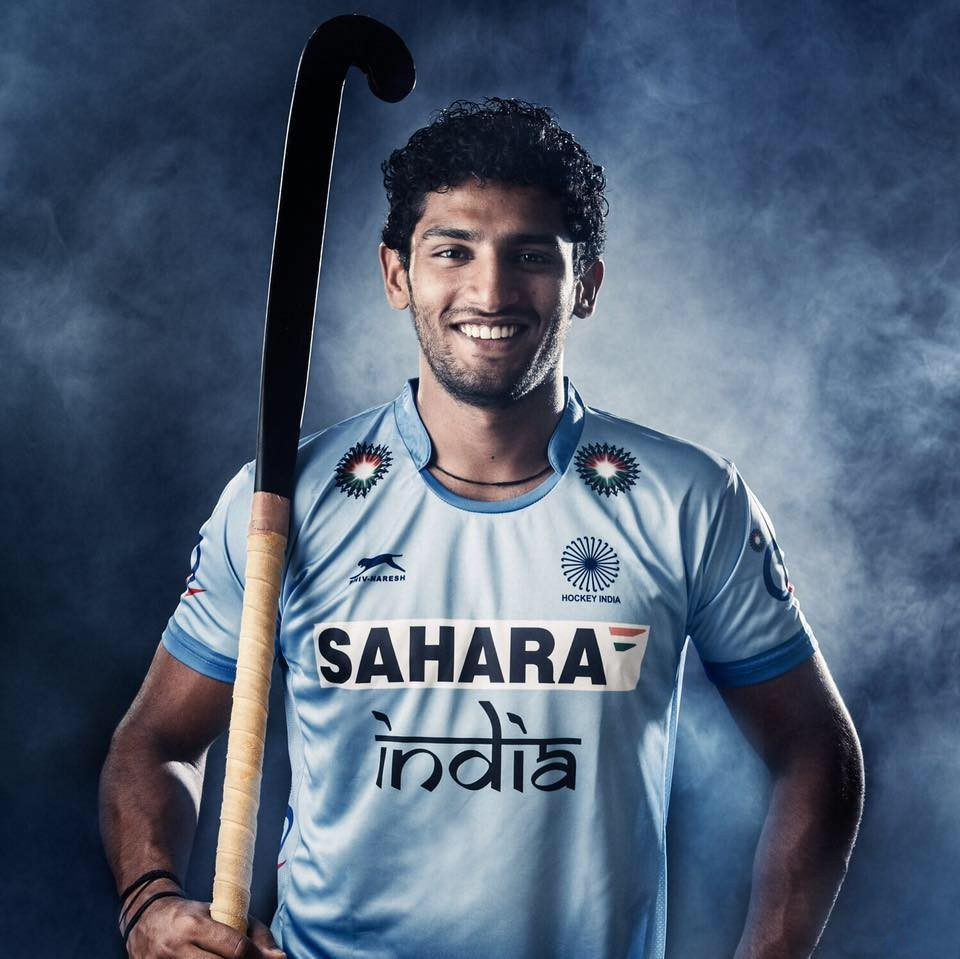
- Uthappa at a photoshoot in 2015

Personal information
- Full name: Sannuvanda Kushalappa Uthappa
- Born: 2 December 1993 (age 32) Kodagu, Karnataka, India
- Height: 1.85 m (6 ft 1 in)
- Spouse: Sanjana Puttichanda

Sport
- Sport: Field hockey
- Position: Attacking midfielder
Senior career
Years	Team	Caps	Goals
2011–	IOCL	-	-
2013–2015	Uttar Pradesh Wizards	40	2
2016–	Kalinga Lancers	24	2
National team
Years	Team	Caps	Goals
2012–	India	115	(12)
Medal record
Men's field hockey
Representing India
Champions Trophy
Silver medal – second place	2016 London
Asia Cup
Silver medal – second place	2013 Ipoh
Gold medal – first place	2017 Dhaka
Asian Champions Trophy
Gold medal – first place	2016 Kuantan
Hockey World League
Bronze medal – third place	2016–17 Bhubaneswar	Team

Sannuvanda Kushalappa Uthappa (born 2 December 1993) is an Indian professional field hockey player who plays as an attacking midfielder for the India national team and Kalinga Lancers at the Hockey India League.

S. K. Uthappa made his international debut in 2012 and has since made over 100 appearances for the national team. He was a part of the team that won silver at the 2016 Champions Trophy.

== Early life ==
Uthappa picked up the sport as a profession at the age of eight after watching his brother play hockey for Bangalore University as he grew up. Then a student of Lions School, Gonikoppal in Karnataka's Kodagu district, he was actively involved in sports and won competitions of badminton, football, basketball and hockey. He holds the Karnataka State record for most goals scored (16) in a five-game inter-district tournament, when he played for his district, Kodagu.

Uthappa took to hockey professionally at 14 and joined the Sports Authority of India, Bangalore, in 2004. There he represented his school St. Joseph's Indian High School, and St. Joseph's College of Commerce and Bangalore University, before being chosen to play for the junior team of his State, Karnataka. In 2010, he captained the side to the nationals title in Pune, defeating hockey Punjab in the final. Playing for the senior team in 2011 at the National Championships, he was named the Best Player; his side finished second.

== Career ==
=== International career ===
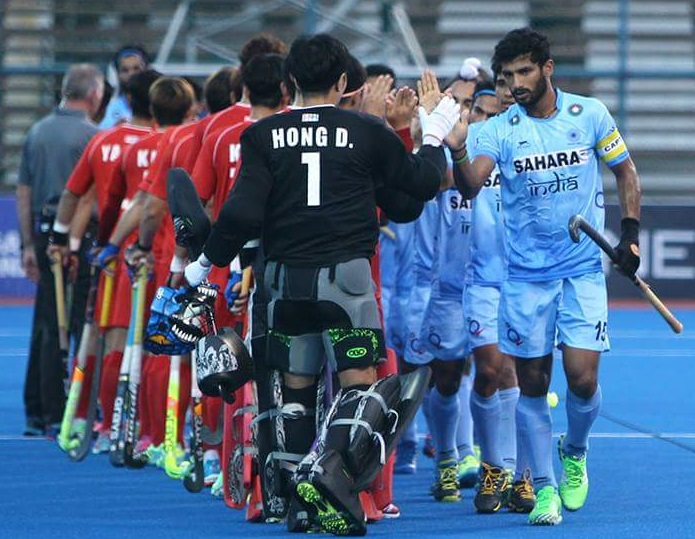
Uthappa wearing the captain's armband, 2016

Uthappa made his international debut against South Africa on 16 January 2012 at the first match of a five-match series, in Delhi. He scored a goal in the game, in the 53rd minute. He featured in four of the five games and scored a total of three goals. He was then picked to play at the 2012 Olympics Qualification Tournament and appeared in all of the six games, scoring one goal, against Singapore.

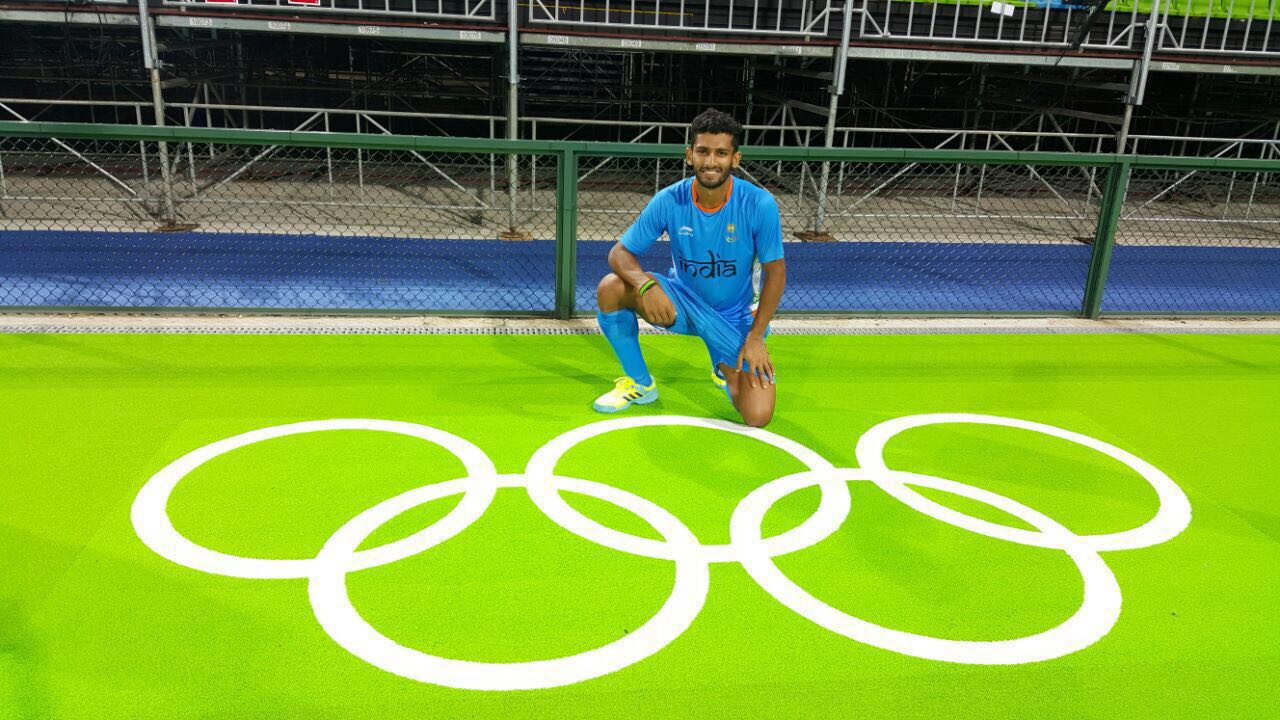
Uthappa at the 2016 Rio Olympics

Uthappa captained the side for the first time at the 2016 Asian Champions Trophy in Malaysia, in a league game against Pakistan, in the process of rotation of captaincy the team followed after the 2016 Rio Olympics. His side won the game 3–2.

=== Club career ===
==== Hockey India League ====
In the inaugural edition of the Hockey India League in 2013, Uthappa was picked up by the Uttar Pradesh Wizards franchise. He played for three editions of the tournament, till 2015. In the 2013 season, the team finished third. For the 2016 season, he was bought by Kalinga Lancers for US$54,000. The side finished second. The team won the season in 2017, beating Dabang Mumbai in the final.

== Honours ==
=== International ===
- Champions Trophy: 2016, second place
- Asian Hockey Champions Trophy: 2016

=== Club ===
- Hockey India League: 2017

=== Individual ===
- Ekalavya Award, 2014
