= 2016 Hockey India League =

Coal India Hockey India League 2016
Tournament details
- Dates: 18 January – 21 February
- Administrator(s): Hockey India
- Format(s): Double round-robin and Knock-out
- Host(s): India
- Venue(s): 6
- Teams: 6

Final positions
- Champions: Punjab Warriors (1st title)
- Runner-up: Kalinga Lancers
- Third Place: Delhi Waveriders

Tournament summary
- Matches played: 34
- Goals scored: 138 (4.06 per match)
- Player of the tournament: Rupinder Pal Singh (Delhi Waveriders)
- Most goals: Glenn Turner (15 goals)

The 2016 Hockey India League (HIL) (known as Coal India Hockey India League for sponsorship reasons) is the fourth season of the professional field hockey tournament. The Hockey India League began on 18 January and concluded with Punjab Warriors as champion against Kalinga Lancers in the final on 21 February.

== Teams ==
Locations of HIL teams

Team	City	Stadium	Capacity
Delhi Waveriders	Delhi	Shivaji Stadium	7,000
Kalinga Lancers	Bhubaneswar	Kalinga Hockey Stadium	6,000
Dabang Mumbai	Mumbai	Mahindra Hockey Stadium	8,250
Punjab Warriors	Chandigarh	Sector 42 Stadium	30,000
Ranchi Rays	Ranchi	Astroturf Hockey Stadium	5,000
Uttar Pradesh Wizards	Lucknow	Dhyan Chand Astroturf Stadium	10,000

== Players auction ==
There were a total of 271 players available during the auction in Delhi, 135 being Indian players and 136 being foreign. Akashdeep Singh was won by Uttar Pradesh Wizards for $84,000 while Moritz Fürste was won by Kalinga Lancers for $105,000.

== Rule changes for 2016 ==
The organizers of Hockey India League announced changes in rules for the 2016 edition. The changes put the focus firmly back on the more traditional art of scoring. The weightage for field goals were double compared to the goals scored from penalty corners, meaning a field goal would count as two while successfully converted short corner would still be considered as one goal. It was called a pilot project, and if successful, would also be introduced globally.

== Standings ==
Pos	Team	Pld	W	D	L	GF	GA	GD	Pts	Qualification
1	Ranchi Rays	10	7	0	3	33	27	+6	37	Advanced to Semi-finals
2	Punjab Warriors	10	5	1	4	32	26	+6	29	Advanced to Semi-finals
3	Delhi Waveriders	10	5	0	5	35	37	−2	27	Advanced to Semi-finals
4	Kalinga Lancers	10	4	1	5	39	36	+3	25	Advanced to Semi-finals
5	Dabang Mumbai	10	4	0	6	34	35	−1	25	
6	Uttar Pradesh Wizards	10	4	0	6	30	42	−12	23	

Source: Pool standings
Rules for classification: 1) points; 2) matches won; 3) goal difference; 4) goals scored; 5) head-to-head points, goal difference & goals scored; 6) shoot‐out competition

=== Results table ===
Home \ Away	DM	DWR	KL	JPW	RR	UPW
Dabang Mumbai	—	3–4	4–6	1–5	7–5	6–3
Delhi Waveriders	3–8	—	6–0	2–5	7–4	4–6
Kalinga Lancers	4–2	4–0	—	1–4	2–3	6–8
Punjab Warriors	3–1	4–5	4–4	—	2–0	0–3
Ranchi Rays	1–0	2–1	3–2	5–4	—	6–0
Uttar Pradesh Wizards	1–2	1–3	2–10	4–1	2–4	—

Source: HIL

18 January 2016
18:00

Kalinga Lancers	6–8	Uttar Pradesh Wizards
Mor 15'; Turner 29', 37'	Report	Jolie 9'; Bain 14'; Ockenden 60'; Akashdeep 60'

Kalinga Hockey Stadium, Bhubaneswar
Umpires:
Marcin Grochal (POL)
R. V. Raghuprasad (IND)

19 January 2016
18:00

Punjab Warriors	2–0	Ranchi Rays
Whetton 2'	Report

Sector 42 Stadium, Chandigarh
Umpires:
Martin Madden (SCO)
Ripudaman Sharma (IND)

20 January 2016
18:00

Punjab Warriors	4–5	Delhi Waveriders
Gohdes 10'; Ciriello 29'; Gleghorne 59'	Report	Walmiki 9'; Rupinder Pal 24', 36'; Pearson 28'

Sector 42 Stadium, Chandigarh
Umpires:
Ben Gontgen (GER)
Anil Kumar (IND)

21 January 2016
17:50

Kalinga Lancers	4–2	Dabang Mumbai
Dixon 45'; Turner 51'	Report	Fuchs 35'

Kalinga Hockey Stadium, Bhubaneswar
Umpires:
David Tomlinson (NZL)
Deepak Joshi (IND)

22 January 2016
17:50

Uttar Pradesh Wizards	2–4	Ranchi Rays
Ramandeep 4'	Report	Sarvanjit 45'; Jackson 48', 60'

Dhyan Chand Astroturf Stadium, Lucknow
Umpires:
German Montes de Oca (ARG)
Gurinder Sangha (IND)

23 January 2016
17:50

Uttar Pradesh Wizards	1–3	Delhi Waveriders
Peillat 60'	Report	Rupinder Pal 42'; Edwards 59'

Dhyan Chand Astroturf Stadium, Lucknow
Umpires:
Jakub Mejzlik (CZE)
Dhaval Prajapati (IND)

24 January 2016
17:50

Punjab Warriors	3–1	Dabang Mumbai
Qureshi 9'; Ciriello 21'	Report	Harmanpreet 39'

Sector 42 Stadium, Chandigarh
Umpires:
Marcin Grochal (POL)
R. V. Raghuprasad (IND)

25 January 2016
17:50

Uttar Pradesh Wizards	2–10	Kalinga Lancers
Peillat 14'	Report	Zalewski 20'; Turner 43', 47'; Upadhyay 45'; Dharamvir 60'

Dhyan Chand Astroturf Stadium, Lucknow
Umpires:
German Montes de Oca (ARG)
Gurinder Sangha (IND)

26 January 2016
17:50

Ranchi Rays	2–1	Delhi Waveriders
Jackson 29', 31'	Report	Rupinder Pal 27'

Astroturf Hockey Stadium, Ranchi
Umpires:
Martin Madden (SCO)
Anil Kumar (IND)

28 January 2016
17:50

Ranchi Rays	3–2	Kalinga Lancers
Jackson 39'; Deavin 48'	Report	Malak 33'

Astroturf Hockey Stadium, Ranchi
Umpires:
David Tomlinson (NZL)
R. V. Raghuprasad (IND)

29 January 2016
17:50

Dabang Mumbai	3–4	Delhi Waveriders
Fuchs 12'; Harmanpreet 54'	Report	Rupinder Pal 8', 39'; Talwinder 56'

Mahindra Hockey Stadium, Mumbai
Umpires:
Ben Gontgen (GER)
Ripudaman Sharma (IND)

30 January 2016
17:50

Ranchi Rays	5–4	Punjab Warriors
Kothajit 18'; Beale 28'; Sandeep 43'	Report	Qureshi 7'; Satbir 31'

Astroturf Hockey Stadium, Ranchi
Umpires:
Martin Madden (SCO)
Anil Kumar (IND)

31 January 2016
17:50

Dabang Mumbai	4–6	Kalinga Lancers
Fuchs 41'; Gurjant 47'	Report	Gurjinder 20'; Dixon 28'; Upadhyay 33'; Caspers 55'

Astroturf Hockey Stadium, Ranchi
Umpires:
Jakub Mejzlik (CZE)
Dhaval Prajapati (IND)

1 February 2016
17:50

Delhi Waveriders	4–6	Uttar Pradesh Wizards
Reid-Ross 55'; Talwinder 58'	Report	Raghunath 19'; Chinglensana 54'; Dwyer 55'; Peillat 58'

Shivaji Stadium, Delhi
Umpires:
Marcin Grochal (POL)
Gurinder Sangha (IND)

2 February 2016
17:50

Delhi Waveriders	2–5	Punjab Warriors
Rupinder Pal 35', 55'	Report	Gleghorne 10'; Knowles 11'; Ciriello 22'; Whetton 37'

Shivaji Stadium, Delhi
Umpires:
German Montes de Oca (ARG)
Deepak Joshi (IND)

3 February 2016
17:45

Dabang Mumbai	7–5	Ranchi Rays
Ram 11'; Swann 21'; N. Sharma 41'; Fuchs 48'	Report	Jackson 18', 41'; Sarvanjit 38'; Sandeep 59'

Mahindra Hockey Stadium, Mumbai
Umpires:
Ben Gontgen (GER)
Ripudaman Sharma (IND)

4 February 2016
17:45

Punjab Warriors	0–3	Uttar Pradesh Wizards
	Report	Akashdeep 44'; Peillat 60'

Sector 42 Stadium, Chandigarh
Umpires:
German Montes de Oca (ARG)
Marcin Grochal (POL)

5 February 2016
17:45

Kalinga Lancers	4–0	Delhi Waveriders
Turner 5', 56'	Report

Kalinga Hockey Stadium, Bhubaneswar
Umpires:
David Tomlinson (ARG)
Anil Kumar (IND)

6 February 2016
17:45

Uttar Pradesh Wizards	1–2	Dabang Mumbai
Peillat 14'	Report	Bjorkman 8'

Dhyan Chand Astroturf Stadium, Lucknow
Umpires:
Marcin Grochal (POL)
RV Raghuprasad (IND)

7 February 2016
17:45

Kalinga Lancers	1–4	Punjab Warriors
Turner 42'	Report	Orchard 48'; Satbir 58'

Kalinga Hockey Stadium, Bhubaneswar
Umpires:
Jakub Mejzlik (CZE)
Ripudaman Sharma (IND)

8 February 2016
17:45

Kalinga Lancers	2–3	Ranchi Rays
Dharamvir 9'	Report	Jackson 10'; Khan 9'

Kalinga Stadium, Bhubaneswar
Umpires:
David Tomlinson (NZL)
Anil Kumar (IND)

9 February 2016
17:45

Delhi Waveriders	3–8	Dabang Mumbai
Edwards 22'; Rupinder Pal 39'	Report	Mujtaba 49'; N. Sharma 52'; Manpreet 57', 58'

Shivaji Stadium, Delhi
Umpires:
Martin Madden (SCO)
Gurinder Sangha (IND)

10 February 2016
17:45

Uttar Pradesh Wizards	4–1	Punjab Warriors
Peillat 19', 32'; Mazzilli 43'	Report	Gleghorne 10'

Dhyan Chand Astroturf Stadium, Lucknow
Umpires:
Ben Gontgen (GER)
Marcin Grochal (POL)

11 February 2016
17:45

Delhi Waveriders	7–4	Ranchi Rays
Mandeep 7', 42'; Talwinder 13', 19'	Report	Jackson 35'; Mitton 50'

Shivaji Stadium, Delhi
Umpires:
Martin Madden (SCO)
German Montes de Oca (ARG)

12 February 2016
17:45

Dabang Mumbai	1–5	Punjab Warriors
Hayward 60+'	Report	Kumar 2'; Gleghorne 13'; Ciriello 26'; Thimmaiah 41'

Mahindra Hockey Stadium, Mumbai
Umpires:
Martin Madden (SCO)
David Tomlinson (NZL)

13 February 2016
17:45

Ranchi Rays	6–0	Uttar Pradesh Wizards
Ogilvie 40'; Jackson 47'; Kumar 59'	Report

Astroturf Hockey Stadium, Ranchi
Umpires:
German Montes de Oca (ARG)
Anil Kumar (IND)

14 February 2016
17:45

Ranchi Rays	1–0	Dabang Mumbai
Jackson 35'	Report

Astroturf Hockey Stadium, Ranchi
Umpires:
Ben Gontgen (GER)
German Montes de Oca (ARG)

15 February 2016
17:45

Punjab Warriors	4–4	Kalinga Lancers
Gohdes 35'; Whetton 59'	Report	Malak 14'; Caspers 29'

Sector 42 Stadium, Chandigarh
Umpires:
Jakub Mejzlik (CZE)
RV Raghuprasad (IND)

16 February 2016
17:45

Dabang Mumbai	6–3	Uttar Pradesh Wizards
Gurjant 13'; Fuchs 42'; Yousuf 59'	Report	Raghunath 19'; Chinglensana 30'

Mahindra Hockey Stadium. Mumbai
Umpires:
David Tomlinson (NZL)
Marcin Grochal (POL)

17 February 2016
17:45

Delhi Waveriders	6–0	Kalinga Lancers
Rupinder Pal 18', 33'; Child 34'; Parvinder 56'	Report

Shivaji Stadium, Delhi
Umpires:
Martin Madden (SCO)
Jakub Mejzlik (CZE)

=== First to fourth place classification ===
Semi-finals
20 February–Astroturf Hockey Stadium, Ranchi
Punjab Warriors	3
Delhi Waveriders	1
20 February–Astroturf Hockey Stadium, Ranchi
Ranchi Rays	2 (2)
Kalinga Lancers	2 (4)

Final
21 February–Astroturf Hockey Stadium, Ranchi
Punjab Warriors	6
Kalinga Lancers	1
Third place
21 February–Astroturf Hockey Stadium, Ranchi
Delhi Waveriders	2
Ranchi Rays	0

==== Semi-finals ====
20 February 2016
15:00

Punjab Warriors	3–1	Delhi Waveriders
Qureshi 19'; Orchard 51'	Report	Rupinder Pal 6'

Astroturf Hockey Stadium, Ranchi
Umpires:
German Montes de Oca (ARG)
Jakub Mejzlik (CZE)

20 February 2016
17:30

Ranchi Rays	2–2	Kalinga Lancers
Mitton 57'; Deavin 60'	Report	Gurjinder 22'; Turner 58'
Penalties
Jackson (penalty shoot-out missed); Sarvanjit (penalty shoot-out scored); Manpreet (penalty shoot-out scored); Middleton (penalty shoot-out missed)	2–4	(penalty shoot-out scored) Fürste; (penalty shoot-out scored) Caspers; (penalty shoot-out scored) Upadhyay; (penalty shoot-out scored) Zalewski

Astroturf Hockey Stadium, Ranchi
Umpires:
Marcin Grochal (POL)
Ben Gontgen (GER)

==== Third and fourth place ====
21 February 2016
15:00

Delhi Waveriders	2–0	Ranchi Rays
Mandeep 18'	Report

Astroturf Hockey Stadium, Ranchi
Umpires:
Anil Kumar (IND)
David Tomlinson (NZL)

==== Final ====
21 February 2016
17:30

Punjab Warriors	6–1	Kalinga Lancers
Qureshi 4'; Gohdes 39'; Satbir 42'	Report	Fürste 24'

Astroturf Hockey Stadium, Ranchi
Umpires:
RV Raghuprasad (IND)
Martin Madden (SCO)

== Awards ==
Player of the Tournament	Maximum Goals	Upcoming Player of the Tournament
Rupinder Pal Singh (Delhi Waveriders)	Glenn Turner (Kalinga Lancers)	Sumit Kumar (Ranchi Rays)
