= 2017 Hockey India League =

Hockey league

Coal India Hockey India League 2017
Tournament details
- Dates: 21 January – 26 February
- Administrator(s): Hockey India
- Format(s): Double round-robin Knock-out
- Host(s): India
- Venue(s): 6
- Teams: 6

Final positions
- Champions: Kalinga Lancers (1st title)
- Runner-up: Dabang Mumbai
- Third Place: Uttar Pradesh Wizards

Tournament summary
- Matches played: 34
- Goals scored: 206 (6.06 per match)
- Player of the tournament: Florian Fuchs from Dabang Mumbai
- Most goals: Glenn Turner; Moritz Fürste (12 goals)

The 2017 Hockey India League, known as Coal India Hockey India League for sponsorship reasons, was the fifth season of the Hockey India League. It was held between 21 January and 26 February 2017. Kalinga Lancers beat Dabang Mumbai 4–1 in the final to win their first title. Six teams played 34 matches in six venues with final played in Sector 42 Stadium, Chandigarh. The prize money was announced to be 3 crores INR.

Punjab Warriors were the defending champions and were eliminated in the round-robin stage. Uttar Pradesh Wizards finished third, beating Delhi Waveriders in the third place playoff. Kalinga Lancers' Glenn Turner and Moritz Fürste finished as the tournament's joint top-scorers with 12 goals each. Dabang Mumbai's Florian Fuchs was named the Player of the Tournament.

== Teams ==
Locations of HIL teams

Six teams competed in the season, the same from last season.

Team	City	Stadium	Capacity
Delhi Waveriders	Delhi	Shivaji Stadium	7,000
Kalinga Lancers	Bhubaneswar	Kalinga Hockey Stadium	16,000
Dabang Mumbai	Mumbai	Mahindra Hockey Stadium	8,250
Punjab Warriors	Chandigarh	Sector 42 Stadium	30,000
Ranchi Rays	Ranchi	Astroturf Hockey Stadium	5,000
Uttar Pradesh Wizards	Lucknow	Major Dhyan Chand Stadium	10,000

== Format ==
Six teams were placed in a group to play home-away round robin matches. The top four teams qualified for the knockout stage. This season again featured some rules regarding scoring goals as every field goal was double compared to goals scored from penalty corners, meaning a field goal counted as two while successfully converted short corners were considered one goal. Playing eleven, teams had to have a minimum of two and a maximum of five foreign players.

== Standings ==
Pos	Team	Pld	W	D	L	GF	GA	GD	Pts	Qualification
1	Dabang Mumbai (Q)	10	6	2	2	40	32	+8	35	Advanced to Semi-finals
2	Kalinga Lancers (Q)	10	5	1	4	32	40	−8	28	Advanced to Semi-finals
3	Uttar Pradesh Wizards (Q)	10	3	4	3	31	22	+9	25	Advanced to Semi-finals
4	Delhi Waveriders (Q)	10	3	2	5	29	23	+6	23	Advanced to Semi-finals
5	Ranchi Rays (E)	10	3	3	4	25	26	−1	23	
6	Punjab Warriors (E)	10	4	0	6	25	39	−14	22	

Source: Official website
Rules for classification: 1) Points (Win (5) Draw (2) Lost by 3 goals (1) or (0) 2) matches won 3) goal difference 4) goals scored 5) head-to-head points, goal difference & goals scored 6) shoot‐out competition
(E) Eliminated; (Q) Qualified for semi-finals

=== Results table ===
Home \ Away	DM	DWR	KL	JPW	RR	UPW
Dabang Mumbai	—	3–2	3–4	10–4	3–3	4–3
Delhi Waveriders	2–3	—	6–4	2–3	2–6	8–1
Kalinga Lancers	2–5	1–0	—	6–5	4–2	0–10
Punjab Warriors	1–2	1–6	0–7	—	1–0	2–6
Ranchi Rays	7–3	0–0	7–2	0–7	—	0–0
Uttar Pradesh Wizards	4–4	1–1	2–2	0–1	4–0	—

21 January 2017
19:20

Dabang Mumbai	3–3	Ranchi Rays
H. Singh 37'; Thimmaiah 60'	Report	Si. Singh 32'; Ruhr 39'

Mahindra Hockey Stadium, Mumbai
Umpires:
Marcin Grochal (POL)
Javed Shaikh (IND)

22 January 2017
19:20

Kalinga Lancers	1–0	Delhi Waveriders
G. Singh 47'	Report

Kalinga Hockey Stadium, Bhubaneswar
Umpires:
German Montes de Oca (ARG)
RV Raghuprasad (IND)

23 January 2017
19:20

Kalinga Lancers	4–2	Ranchi Rays
Turner 43', 49'	Report	S. Singh 53'

Kalinga Hockey Stadium. Bhubaneswar
Umpires:
Ben Gontgen (GER)
Ripudaman Sharma (IND)

24 January 2017
19:20

Dabang Mumbai	4–3	Uttar Pradesh Wizards
H. Singh 24', 32'; Kemperman 60'	Report	Mazzilli 12'; R. Singh 59'

Mahindra Hockey Stadium, Mumbai
Umpires:
Peter Wright (RSA)
Pankaj Tyagi (IND)

26 January 2017
19:20

Ranchi Rays	7–2	Kalinga Lancers
Jackson 24'; Khan 30'; Ruhr 31'; M. Singh 44'	Report	Upadhyay 49'

Astroturf Hockey Stadium, Ranchi
Umpires:
Marcelo Servetto (ESP)
Javed Shaikh (IND)

27 January 2017
19:20

Dabang Mumbai	10–4	Punjab Warriors
Thimmaiah 6'; Fuchs 30', 43'; Yousuf 49', 50'	Report	Gohdes 13'; Qureshi 44'

Mahindra Hockey Stadium, Mumbai
Umpires:
Marcin Grochal (POL)
Pankaj Tyagi (IND)

28 January 2017
19:20

Ranchi Rays	0–0	Delhi Waveriders
	Report

Astroturf Hockey Stadium, Ranchi
Umpires:
Jakub Mejzlik (CZE)
Deepak Joshi (IND)

29 January 2017
19:20

Kalinga Lancers	0–10	Uttar Pradesh Wizards
	Report	Mazzilli 1'; R. Singh 4', 23'; A. Singh 27', 48'

Kalinga Hockey Stadium, Bhubaneswar
Umpires:
Ben Gontgen (GER)
RV Raghuprasad (IND)

30 January 2017
19:20

Dabang Mumbai	3–2	Delhi Waveriders
Yousuf 29', 30'	Report	Reid-Ross 43'; RP Singh 55'

Mahindra Hockey Stadium, Mumbai
Umpires:
German Montes de Oca (ARG)
Javed Shaikh (IND)

31 January 2017
19:20

Dabang Mumbai	3–4	Kalinga Lancers
H. Singh 27', 43'	Report	Fürste 32', 33'; Turner 40'

Mahindra Hockey Stadium, Mumbai
Umpires:
Marcelo Servetto (ESP)
Deepak Joshi (IND)

1 February 2017
19:20

Ranchi Rays	0–7	Punjab Warriors
	Report	Van der Weerden 25'; Sunil 26', 34'; Whetton 43'

Astroturf Hockey Stadium, Ranchi
Umpires:
Marcin Grochal (POL)
Pankaj Tyagi (IND)

2 February 2017
19:20

Ranchi Rays	7–3	Dabang Mumbai
Jackson 5', 49'; Khan 16'; I. Khan 57'	Report	Fuchs 2'; Yousuf 51'

Astroturf Hockey Stadium, Ranchi
Umpires:
Ripudaman Sharma (IND)
Ben Gontgen (GER)

3 February 2017
19:20

Kalinga Lancers	6–5	Punjab Warriors
Turner 11'; Fürste 18', 28'; Uthappa 32'	Report	Gleghorne 34'; Sat. Singh 35'; Weerden 52'; Qureshi 57'

Kalinga Hockey Stadium, Bhubaneswar
Umpires:
Peter Wright (RSA)
Javed Shaikh (IND)

4 February 2017
19:20

Ranchi Rays	0–0	Uttar Pradesh Wizards
	Report

Astroturf Hockey Stadium, Ranchi
Umpires:
Marcin Grochal (POL)
RV Raghuprasad (IND)

5 February 2017
19:20

Kalinga Lancers	2–5	Dabang Mumbai
Turner 57'	Report	H. Singh 23'; Fuchs 31'; Gurj. Singh 53'

Kalinga Hockey Stadium, Bhubaneswar
Umpires:
Jakub Mejzlik (CZE)
Deepak Joshi (IND)

7 February 2017
19:20

Delhi Waveriders	2–3	Punjab Warriors
White 39'	Report	Van der Horst 15'; Van der Weerden 53'

Shivaji Stadium, Delhi
Umpires:
Marcelo Servetto (ESP)
Ripudaman Sharma (IND)

8 February 2017
19:20

Delhi Waveriders	8–1	Uttar Pradesh Wizards
M. Singh 4', 30'; P. Singh 57'; Smith 58'	Report	Raghunath 14'

Shivaji Stadium, Delhi
Umpires:
Peter Wright (RSA)
Javed Shaikh (IND)

9 February 2017
19:20

Punjab Warriors	1–0	Ranchi Rays
Van der Weerden 25'	Report

Sector 42 Stadium, Chandigarh
Umpires:
German Montes de Oca (ARG)
RV Raghuprasad (IND)

10 February 2017
19:20

Uttar Pradesh Wizards	2–2	Kalinga Lancers
Raghunath 15'; Peillat 60+'	Report	Fürste 15', 51'

Major Dhyan Chand Stadium, Lucknow
Umpires:
Marcin Grochal (POL)
Deepak Joshi (IND)

11 February 2017
19:20

Punjab Warriors	1–2	Dabang Mumbai
Van der Weerden 37'	Report	Kemperman 60'

Sector 42 Stadium, Chandigarh
Umpires:
Jakub Mejzlik (CZE)
Marcelo Servetto (ESP)

12 February 2017
19:20

Delhi Waveriders	6–4	Kalinga Lancers
T. Singh 9'; Reid-Ross 29'; RP Singh 57'; Child 59'	Report	D. Singh 40'; Fürste 54'

Shivaji Stadium, Delhi
Umpires:
Peter Wright (RSA)
RV Raghuprasad (IND)

13 February 2017
19:20

Punjab Warriors	2–6	Uttar Pradesh Wizards
Pruyser 31'	Report	S. Singh 5'; Yadav 40'; A. Singh 58'

Sector 42 Stadium, Chandigarh
Umpires:
Jakub Mejzlik (CZE)
Ripudaman Sharma (IND)

15 February 2017
19:20

Delhi Waveriders	2–3	Dabang Mumbai
M. Singh 44'	Report	Govers 24'; Fuchs 60'

Shivaji Stadium, Delhi
Umpires:
German Montes de Oca (ARG)
Deepak Joshi (IND)

16 February 2017
19:20

Uttar Pradesh Wizards	4–0	Ranchi Rays
Van Ass 37'; A. Singh 60'	Report

Major Dhyan Chand Stadium, Lucknow
Umpires:
Marcin Grochal (POL)
Javed Shaikh (IND)

17 February 2017
19:20

Punjab Warriors	1–6	Delhi Waveriders
Gleghorne 30'	Report	Reid-Ross 4'; RP Singh 17'; M. Singh 38'; Lewers 44'

Sector 42 Stadium, Chandigarh
Umpires:
Ben Gontgen (GER)
RV Raghuprasad (IND)

18 February 2017
19:20

Punjab Warriors	0–7	Kalinga Lancers
	Report	Dixon 9'; Fürste 24'; Upadhyay 34'; D. Singh 39'

Sector 42 Stadium, Chandigarh
Umpires:
Jakub Mejzlik (CZE)
Ben Gontgen (GER)

19 February 2017
19:20

Uttar Pradesh Wizards	1–1	Delhi Waveriders
Peillat 22'	Report	RP Singh 22'

Major Dhyan Chand Stadium, Lucknow
Umpires:
Marcelo Servetto (ESP)
Javed Shaikh (IND)

20 February 2017
19:20

Uttar Pradesh Wizards	0–1	Punjab Warriors
	Report	Van der Weerden 35'

Major Dhyan Chand Stadium, Lucknow
Umpires:
Marcelo Servetto (ESP)
German Montes de Oca (ARG)

21 February 2017
19:20

Delhi Waveriders	2–6	Ranchi Rays
Reid-Ross 45'	Report	M. Singh 9', 32'; Khan 37'

Shivaji Stadium, Delhi
Umpires:
Marcin Grochal (POL)
Jakub Mejzlik (CZE)

22 February 2017
19:20

Uttar Pradesh Wizards	4–4	Dabang Mumbai
Yadav 12'; R. Singh 17'	Report	Gurj. Singh 13'; M. Singh 19'

Major Dhyan Chand Stadium, Lucknow
Umpires:
German Montes de Oca (ARG)
Marcelo Servetto (ESP)

=== First to fourth place classification ===
Semi-finals
25 February–Sector 42 Stadium, Chandigarh
Dabang Mumbai	2
Delhi Waveriders	0
25 February–Sector 42 Stadium, Chandigarh
Kalinga Lancers	4 (4)
Uttar Pradesh Wizards	4 (3)

Final
26 February–Sector 42 Stadium, Chandigarh
Dabang Mumbai	1
Kalinga Lancers	4
Third place
26 February–Sector 42 Stadium, Chandigarh
Delhi Waveriders	4
Uttar Pradesh Wizards	5

==== Semi-finals ====
25 February 2017
16:50 IST

Kalinga Lancers	4–4	Uttar Pradesh Wizards
Walmiki 9'; Fürste 35'; Bakker 46'	Report	Van Aubel 4'; A. Singh 58'
Penalties
Fürste (penalty shoot-out missed); Dixon (penalty shoot-out missed); Upadhyay (penalty shoot-out scored); Zalewski (penalty shoot-out scored); D. Singh (penalty shoot-out missed); Fürste (penalty shoot-out missed); Upadhyay (penalty shoot-out scored); Zalewski (penalty shoot-out scored)	4–3	(penalty shoot-out scored) Peillat; (penalty shoot-out scored) Van Aubel; (penalty shoot-out missed) R. Singh; (penalty shoot-out missed) A. Singh; (penalty shoot-out missed) Baart; (penalty shoot-out missed) Mazzilli; (penalty shoot-out scored) Van Aubel; (penalty shoot-out missed) A. Singh

Sector 42 Stadium, Chandigarh
Umpires:
German Montes de Oca (ARG)
Ben Gontgen (GER)

25 February 2017
19:20 IST

Dabang Mumbai	2–0	Delhi Waveriders
Kemperman 26'	Report

Sector 42 Stadium, Chandigarh
Umpires:
Marcin Grochal (POL)
Jakub Mejzlik (CZE)

==== Third and fourth place ====
26 February 2017
16:50 IST

Delhi Waveriders	4–5	Uttar Pradesh Wizards
Reid-Ross 15'; RP Singh 24', 36'	Report	S. Singh 18'; Peillat 38'; Mazzilli 57'

Sector 42 Stadium, Chandigarh
Umpires:
Ben Gontgen (GER)
Javed Shaikh (IND)

==== Final ====
26 February 2017
19:20 IST

Dabang Mumbai	1–4	Kalinga Lancers
Yousuf 33'	Report	Turner 18'; Fürste 30', 59'

Sector 42 Stadium, Chandigarh
Umpires:
Marcelo Servetto (ESP)
R. V. Raghuprasad (IND)

== Statistics ==
=== Leading goalscorers ===
Rank	Player	Team	Goals	FG/PC/PS1/PS2^{^}
1	Moritz Fürste	Kalinga Lancers	12	1/10/0/0
1	Glenn Turner	Kalinga Lancers	12	5/0/0/1
3	Florian Fuchs	Dabang Mumbai	10	5/0/0/0
3	Akashdeep Singh	Uttar Pradesh Wizards	10	5/0/0/0
5	Affan Yousuf	Dabang Mumbai	9	3/3/0/0
6	Mandeep Singh	Delhi Waveriders	8	4/0/0/0
Total 51 scorers			206	76/45/3/3

== Awards ==
Player of the Tournament	Highest goalscorer	Most saves	Upcoming Player of the Tournament	Achiever of the Tournament	Fairplay Trophy
Florian Fuchs (Dabang Mumbai)	Glenn Turner; Moritz Fürste (Kalinga Lancers) (12 goals)	P. R. Sreejesh (Uttar Pradesh Wizards)	Harmanpreet Singh (Dabang Mumbai)	Florian Fuchs (Dabang Mumbai)	Kalinga Lancers

== Attendances ==
#	HIL club	Average attendance
1	Kalinga Lancers	6,342
2	Punjab Warriors	5,201
3	Uttar Pradesh Wizards	4,502
4	Delhi Waveriders	4,128
5	Dabang Mumbai	3,723
6	Ranchi Rays	3,658
