= Moritz Fürste =

German field hockey player

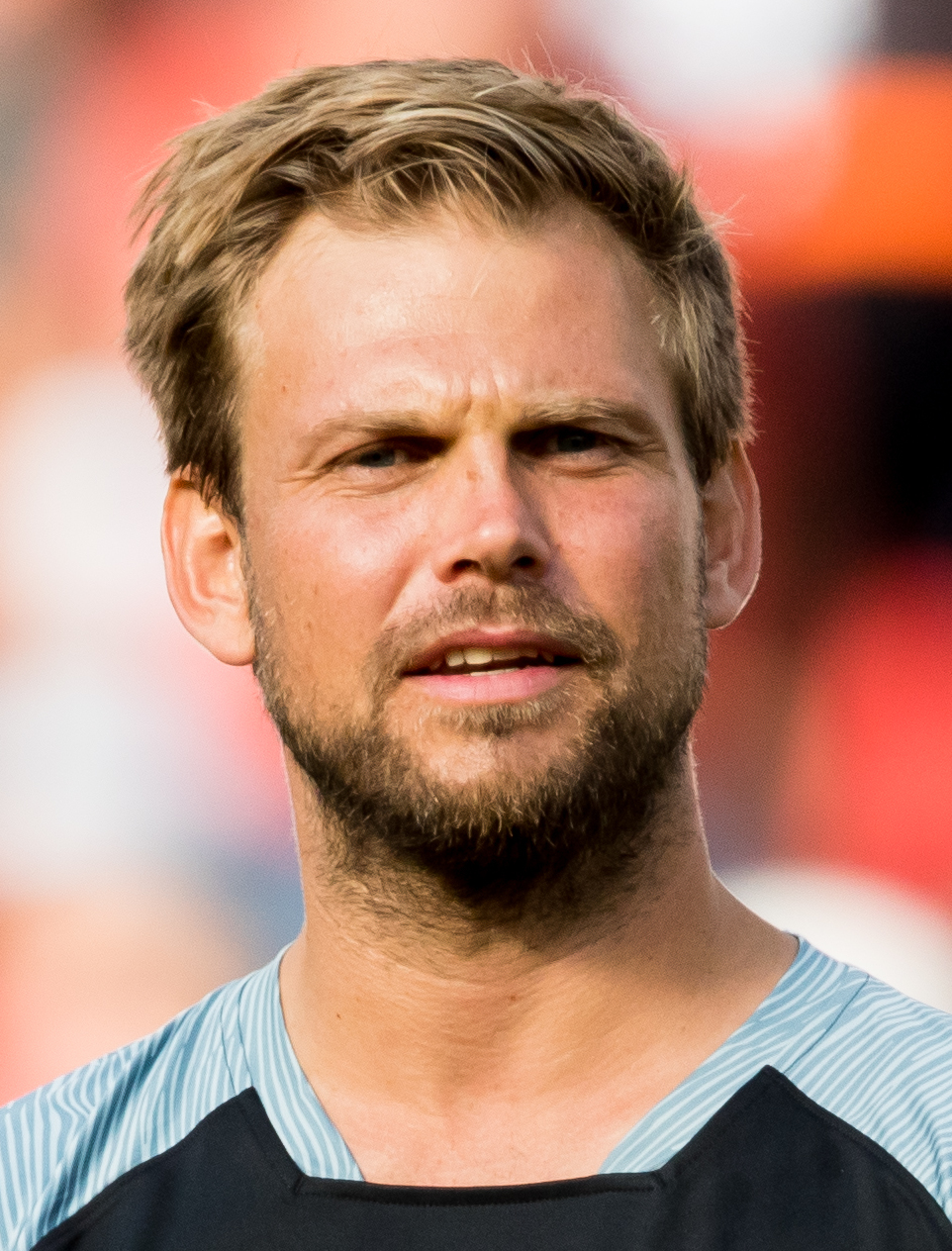
- Fürste in 2019

Personal information
- Born: 28 October 1984 (age 41) Hamburg, West Germany
- Height: 1.90 m (6 ft 3 in)
- Weight: 89 kg (196 lb)

Sport
- Sport: Field hockey
- Position: Half Back
Senior career
| Years | Team | Caps | Goals |
| 2013–2014 | Ranchi Rhinos | 21 | 4 |
| 2015 | Ranchi Rays | - | - |
| 2016–2017 | Kalinga Lancers | 1 | 0 |
| 2013–2018 | Uhlenhorster HC | - | - |
| 2020 | Royal Beerschot THC | - | - |
National team
| Years | Team | Caps | Goals |
| 2005-2016 | Germany | 268 | (112) |
Medal record
Olympic Games
| Gold medal – first place | 2008 Beijing | Team |
| Gold medal – first place | 2012 London | Team |
| Bronze medal – third place | 2016 Rio de Janeiro | Team |
World Cup
| Gold medal – first place | 2006 Mönchengladbach |
European Championship
| Gold medal – first place | 2011 Gladbach |
Champions Trophy
| Gold medal – first place | 2007 Kuala Lumpur |
| Gold medal – first place | 2014 Bhubaneswar |

Moritz Fürste (born 28 October 1984) is a German field hockey player. He was a member of the Germany men's national field hockey team that won the gold medal at the 2008 Summer Olympics and 2012 Summer Olympics as well as at the 2006 World Cup.

== Career ==
Fürste played at the Uhlenhorster Hockey Club in Hamburg from 1989 till 2012. He was captain of the team and had guided his team to success in the Euro Hockey League on three occasions, winning the title in 2007–08, 2009–10 and 2011–12. Fürste also helped his team to a second-place finish in the competition in the 2008–09 season, when they were defeated by HC Bloemendaal of Netherlands.

Moritz Fürste was named as the Euro Hockey League's Most Valuable Player in the 2007–08 and 2009–10 seasons. At the 2011 European Championship, he got the Award as Most Valuable Player of the tournament.

In 2012, Fürste moved to Spanish club Club de Campo Villa de Madrid. After retiring after season 2018-2019, he signed a new deal with Royal Beerschot THC in Belgium for 1 season in 2020.

Fürste was also named the IHF World Player of the Year in 2012.

At the inaugural season of the Hockey India League, Fürste was named one of the six marquee players. At the player's auction, he was bought by Ranchi Rhinos for US$75,500, with his base price being US$25,000. He captained the team to a first-place finish in the season. In the second season, the Rhinos finished third. Following the franchise's withdrawal from the League, the entire team was drafted under a new franchise and team named Ranchi Rays, for the third season. Fürste, however, pulled out of the tournament to represent his country at the 2015 Indoor World Cup.

At the 2015 players' auctions, he was bought by Kalinga Lancers for US$105,000, from a base price of US$30,000. His team finished fifth in the round-robin stage and failed to enter the knock-outs. In the 2016 season, he scored the team's lone goal in a 6–1 loss to Punjab Warriors in the final. Reaching the final again in the 2017 season, he scored twice from penalty corner in the final, in the 30th and 59th minutes to beat Dabang Mumbai 4–1. With 12 goals that included 11 penalty corner conversions and one field goal to his name, he emerged as the tournament's top-scorer alongside teammate Glenn Turner.

== Hyrox ==
Fürste co-founded HYROX, a fitness competition format, together with Christian Toetzke in 2017. Every competition starts with a 1 km run, followed by one functional movement, and these two elements are repeated eight times. To date, the 8 functional movements are SkiErg, Sled Push, Sled Pull, Burpee Broad Jump, Rowing, Farmers Carry, Sandbag Lunges, Wall Balls in this respective order. Initially started in Germany, the competition has since expanded worldwide. A network of Hyrox-affiliated gyms has also been established.
