= Gonzalo Peillat =

German field hockey player (born 1992)

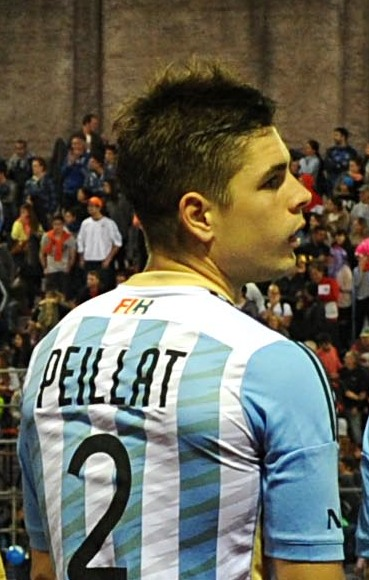
- Peillat with Argentina in 2015

Personal information
- Born: 12 August 1992 (age 34) Buenos Aires, Argentina
- Height: 1.76 m (5 ft 9 in)
- Weight: 80 kg (176 lb)

Sport
- Sport: Field hockey
- Position: Defender
- Club: Mannheimer HC
Senior career
Years	Team	Caps	Goals
–2014	Mitre	-	-
2014–2016	HGC	-	-
2014	Kalinga Lancers	-	-
2015–2017	Uttar Pradesh Wizards	-	-
2016–present	Mannheimer HC	-	-
2018	Terengganu	-	-
2021	Mohammedan SC	-	-
2024–present	Hyderabad Toofans	-	-
National team
Years	Team	Caps	Goals
2011–2019	Argentina	153	(176)
2022–present	Germany	79	(45)
Medal record
Men's field hockey
Representing Argentina
Olympic Games
Gold medal – first place	2016 Rio de Janeiro	Team
World Cup
Bronze medal – third place	2014 The Hague
Pan American Games
Gold medal – first place	2015 Toronto	Team
Pan American Cup
Gold medal – first place	2013 Brampton
Gold medal – first place	2017 Lancaster
World League
Silver medal – second place	2016–17 Bhubaneswar	Team
South American Games
Gold medal – first place	2014 Santiago	Team
South American Championship
Gold medal – first place	2013 Santiago
Pan American Junior Championship
Gold medal – first place	2012 Guadalajara
Representing Germany
Olympic Games
Silver medal – second place	2024 Paris	Team
World Cup
Gold medal – first place	2023 Bhubaneswar/Rourkela
EuroHockey Championships
Gold medal – first place	2025 Mönchengladbach
- Updated on 29 October 2019

Gonzalo Peillat (born 12 August 1992) is a field hockey player who plays as a defender for Men's Feldhockey Bundesliga club Mannheimer HC. Born in Argentina, he represents Germany at international level. He previously played for his country of birth national team. In 2015, Peillat was awarded the FIH 2014 Rising Star of the Year.

He ended his Argentina career with a total of 153 caps and 176 goals. He represented Argentina in field hockey from 2011 to 2018 before switching his allegiance to Germany as of 2022.

== Club career ==
Peillat played for Club Ferrocarril Mitre in Argentina until the 2014 World Cup. After this tournament, he wanted to improve his play so he transferred to the Netherlands to play for HGC. During the 2014 Dutch winter break he played his first season in the Hockey India League for the Kalinga Lancers and in the 2015 Hockey India League played for the Uttar Pradesh Wizards. After he became topscorer in the 2015–16 Dutch hoofdklasse season with 33 goals, he transferred to German club Mannheimer HC. In the 2016 and 2017 German winterbreak he again played for the Uttar Pradesh Wizards in the 2016 and 2017 Hockey India League. In the 2018 winter break when there was no Hockey India League, he played in the Malaysia Hockey League for Terengganu Hockey Team. In April 2018 he renewed his contract for Mannheim for another three years until 2021. He also participated in the premier division hockey league in Bangladesh for Mohameddan Sporting Club.

== International career ==
=== Argentina career ===
He was part of the Argentine squad that emerged as runners-up to New Zealand in the final of the 2012 Sultan Azlan Shah Cup. He was included in the Argentine field hockey squad for the 2012 Summer Olympics and he also made his Olympic debut during the 2012 London Olympics. He was the top goalscorer for Argentina during the men's field hockey competition during the 2012 Summer Olympics with a tally of four goals and Argentina bowed out of the competition with a tenth-place finish. He was the top goalscorer during the 2012 Men's Pan-Am Junior Championship with 15 goals and Argentina eventually won the title by beating Canada in the final. He was a key member of the Argentina squad which won the 2013 Men's Pan American Cup and he scored a hat-trick in the final of the competition against Canada and he scored all four goals in the final for Argentina as they won the final 4–0. He was also the top goalscorer for Argentina at the 2013 Men's Hockey Junior World Cup with four goals. He was a member of the Argentine squad which won the 2013 Men's South American Hockey Championship.

He was named in the Argentine squad for the 2014 Men's FIH Hockey World Cup and it also marked his maiden FIH Hockey World Cup appearance. He was a vital cog of the Argentine hockey team that finished in third place in the 2014 Men's Hockey World Cup, which remains the best ever performance for Argentina to date in a single edition of the FIH Men's Hockey World Cup. He scored the only goal for Argentina during their semi-final defeat to Australia 5–1 and Argentina claimed their first ever World Cup medal by defeating England 2–0 in the third place play-off during the 2014 World Cup campaign. He ended the 2014 Hockey World Cup as the top goalscorer of the tournament with 10 goals. He was part of the Argentina squad which qualified to the quarter-final of the 2014 Men's Hockey Champions Trophy.

He was a key member of the Argentine squad which claimed gold medal in the men's field hockey competition during the 2014 South American Games and he was also the top goalscorer of the competition with a tally of 16 goals. He was the top goalscorer at the 2014–15 Men's FIH Hockey World League Final with 8 goals. He was a crucial member of the Argentine squad which claimed gold medal in the men's field hockey tournament at the 2015 Pan American Games and was also the top goalscorer of the competition with a tally of 14 goals.

He was named in Argentine field hockey squad for the 2016 Summer Olympics and it marked his second Olympic appearance in Argentina colours. He scored a hat-trick in Argentina's win over defending Olympic champions Germany during the semi-final of the 2016 Summer Olympic men's field hockey tournament which helped Argentina to qualify for the final of the competition. All of his three goals came from the penalty corner in the first half of the match as Argentina defeated favourites Germany 5–2 in the semi-final to set up a grand final with Belgium. He also scored a goal in the final of the Olympic hockey tournament and Argentina defeated Belgium 4–2 to clinch the Olympic hockey gold medal for the first time. He was adjudged as the top goalscorer during the men's field hockey tournament at 2016 Summer Olympics with 11 goals. He was an integral member of the Argentine squad which emerged as runners-up to Australia at the 2016–17 Men's FIH Hockey World League Final and he was the top goalscorer for Argentina during the 2016–17 Men's FIH Hockey World League with three goals. He was part of the Argentina squad which won the 2017 Men's Pan American Cup and he was the joint top goalscorer of the competition alongside fellow Argentine player Matías Paredes with seven goals.

He was the top goalscorer of the 2018 Sultan Azlan Shah Cup with 8 goals and he was a vital member of the Argentina side which secured third place during the competition. During the opening match of the 2018 Sultan Azlan Shah Cup between Argentina and India, he scored a hat-trick which sealed the deal for Argentina in a close encounter where Argentina won 3–2. He was also the top goalscorer at the 2018 Men's Hockey Champions Trophy with a tally of 6 goals. He was part of the Argentina squad which emerged as runners-up to Germany at the 2018 Men's Hockey Düsseldorf Masters and he was the joint top goalscorer of the tournament for Argentina alongside Martin Ferreiro with two goals. He was the top goalscorer for Argentina during the 2018 FIH Men's Hockey World Cup with 6 and he was also the second leading goalscorer during the course of the tournament just behind Blake Govers and Alexander Hendrickx's tally of 7 goals. He also scored a brace in Argentina's defeat to England in the quarter-final clash of the 2018 Hockey World Cup, which was his last ever international appearance for him in Argentina colours. Argentina bowed out of the tournament with a seventh-place finish.

He openly publicly criticised the state of hockey in Argentina especially aftermath Argentina's 2018 World Cup campaign. He also pointed out allegations regarding favoritism and player politics in team selection and lack of passion in Argentine hockey. He alongside fellow hockey player Joaquín Menini pinpointed the loopholes in Argentine hockey especially highlighting how the game was managed in the country. Reports also surfaced regarding a rift between Peillat and the then Argentine skipper Agustín Mazzilli during the 2018 FIH Men's Hockey World Cup and the tensions embroiled further with Argentina's shock loss to England 2–3 in the quarter-finals which eventually ended the World Cup campaign for Argentina. Peillat along with Menini soon decided to walk away from Argentine hockey, due to both being ignored mostly by the Argentine hockey fraternity. He also reportedly engaged in a dispute with the Argentine head coach German Orozco in January 2019 and as a result, Peillat took a break from the Argentine national team.

=== Germany career ===
In late February 2022, Peillat acquired German citizenship and its national team coach André Henning asked permission from the International Hockey Federation for him to be part of the squad. On 7 March 2022, Peillat was listed for the first time as a German player to compete in the 2021–2022 Pro League Series. He made his international debut in Germany colours on 26 March 2022 against Spain during the 2021–22 Men's FIH Pro League.

He starred in Germany's dramatic come-from-behind win against world no 1 team Australia during the semi-finals of the 2023 FIH Hockey World Cup by scoring a hat-trick in the second half of the match to help Germany to qualify for the final of the tournament. Germany was trailing at 2–0 during halfway mark but ultimately defeated Australia albeit of Peillat's hat-trick of goals, and the match regulation time ended with Germany winning the tightly fought contest 4–3 at the end of the fourth quarter. Peillat scored from the penalty corners in the 43rd, 52nd and 59th minutes of the semi-final to stun Australia in order to help Germany reach their fourth ever Hockey World Cup final.

== See also ==
- List of men's field hockey players with 100 or more international goals

== Honours ==
=== Club ===
Mannheimer HC

- German national title: 2016–17

=== International ===
Argentina

- Summer Olympics: 2016
- Pan American Games: 2015
- Pan American Cup: 2013, 2017
- South American Games: 2014
- South American Championships: 2013
- Pan American Junior Championship: 2012

Germany

- World Cup: 2023

=== Individual ===
- Summer Olympics top goalscorer: 2016
- Hockey World Cup top goalscorer: 2014
- Pan American Games top goalscorer: 2015
- Pan American Cup top goalscorer: 2017
- Champions Trophy top goalscorer: 2018
- South American Games top goalscorer: 2014
- Sultan Azlan Shah Cup top goalscorer: 2018
- FIH Rising Star of the Year: 2014
