= Tyler Lovell =

Australian field hockey player

Personal information
- Full name: Tyler John Lovell
- Born: 23 May 1987 (age 39) Perth, Australia

Sport
- Sport: Field hockey
- Position: Goalkeeper
Senior career
Years	Team	Caps	Goals
2002–2015	YMCC	-	-
2015–	Ranchi Rays	-	-
National team
Years	Team	Caps	Goals
2013–present	Australia	141	(0)
Medal record
Men's field hockey
Representing Australia
World Cup
Gold medal – first place	2014 The Hague
Bronze medal – third place	2018 Bhubaneswar
Oceania Cup
Gold medal – first place	2013 Stratford
Gold medal – first place	2015 Stratford
Gold medal – first place	2017 Sydney
Gold medal – first place	2019 Rockhampton
FIH Pro League
Gold medal – first place	2019 Amstelveen
Champions Trophy
Gold medal – first place	2016 London
Gold medal – first place	2018 Breda
Bronze medal – third place	2014 Bhubaneswar
World League
Gold medal – first place	2014–15 Raipur	Team
Gold medal – first place	2016–17 Bhubaneswar	Team
Commonwealth Games
Gold medal – first place	2018 Gold Coast	Team

Tyler John Lovell (born 23 May 1987) is an Australian field hockey player who plays as a goalkeeper for the Australian national team.

At the club level, he plays for YMCC in Melville Toyota League in Perth, Western Australia and Ranchi Rays in the Hockey India League. He made his debut for the national team at the 2013 Oceania Cup where they won the gold medal. He was part of Australia squad which won the 2014 World Cup. In December 2019, he was nominated for the FIH Goalkeeper of the Year Award.
