= Chinglensana Singh =

Chinglensana Singh may refer to:

- Chinglensana Singh Kangujam, Indian field hockey player (born 1991)
- Chinglensana Singh Konsham, Indian footballer (born 1996)
