= Ranchi Rays =

Field hockey team based in Ranchi, Jharkhand

- Full name: Ranchi Rays
- League: Hockey India League
- Founded: 2014
- Home ground: Astroturf Hockey Stadium; Ranchi, Jharkhand (Capacity 5,000)

Personnel
- Owner: Mahendra Singh Dhoni

Ranchi Rays was an Indian professional field hockey team based in Ranchi, Jharkhand that competed in the Hockey India League. It was announced as the team to replace the defunct Ranchi Rhinos in October 2014. It was owned by Mahendra Singh Dhoni.

== History ==
In September 2014 it was announced that the inaugural champions of the Hockey India League Ranchi Rhinos had withdrawn, after the owners Patel-Uniexcel Group had come to a disagreement with Hockey India. A month later a new ownership group made of Indian conglomerate Individuals Rahul Srivastava and India cricketer Mahendra Singh Dhoni had bought the franchise rights, which they named Ranchi Rays.

== Squad (2017) ==
Player	Nationality
Goalkeepers
Akash Chikte	India
Tyler Lovell	Australia
Defenders
Timothy Deavin	Australia
Fergus Kavanagh	Australia
Birendra Lakra	India
Vikramjit Singh	India
Midfielders
Ashley Jackson	England
Barry Middleton	England
Trent Mitton	Australia
Flynn Ogilvie	Australia
Gurbaj Singh	India
Kothajit Singh	India
Manpreet Singh	India
Simranjeet Singh	India
Sumit	India
Forwards
Imran Khan	India
Mohammad Amir Khan	India
Sumit Kumar	India
Christopher Rühr	Germany
Sarvanjit Singh	India

== Fixtures and results ==
=== 2015 ===
No.	Date	Result	Opponent	Venue	Report
1	22 January	3 – 6	Kalinga Lancers	Bhubaneswar	Match 1
2	24 January	2 – 1	Dabang Mumbai	Mumbai	Match 2
3	26 January	2 – 2	Delhi Waveriders	Ranchi	Match 6
4	28 January	2 – 2	Dabang Mumbai	Ranchi	Match 8
5	3 February	2 – 0	Uttar Pradesh Wizards	Lucknow	Match 14
6	6 February	4 – 0	Kalinga Lancers	Ranchi	Match 17
7	8 February	1 – 0	Uttar Pradesh Wizards	Ranchi	Match 19
8	10 February	3 – 2	Punjab Warriors	Ranchi	Match 21
9	14 February	0 – 2	Delhi Waveriders	Delhi	Match 25
10	17 February	3 – 2	Punjab Warriors	Mohali	Match 28
11	21 February	1 – 2 (9 – 8 SO)	Uttar Pradesh Wizards	Delhi	Semi-final 1
12	21 February	2 – 2 (3 – 2 SO)	Punjab Warriors	Delhi	Final
Position in League Phase: Champions

- Goals For: 25 (2.08 per match)
- Goals Against: 21 (1.75 per match)
- Most Goals: Ashley Jackson (12)

=== 2016 ===
No.	Date	Result	Opponent	Venue	Report
1	19 January	4– 2	Punjab Warriors	Chandigarh	Match 2
2	22 January	4 – 2	Uttar Pradesh Wizards	Lucknow	Match 5
3	26 January	2 – 1	Delhi Waveriders	Ranchi	Match 9
4	28 January	3 – 2	Kalinga Lancers	Ranchi	Match 10
5	30 January	5 – 4	Punjab Warriors	Lucknow	Match 12
6	3 February	5 – 1	Dabang Mumbai	Mumbai	Match 16
7	8 February	3 – 2	Kalinga Lancers	Bhubaneswar	Match 21
8	11 February	4 – 7	Delhi Waveriders	Delhi	Match 24
9	13 February	6 – 0	Uttar Pradesh Wizards	Ranchi	Match 26
10	14 February	1 – 0	Dabang Mumbai	Ranchi	Match 27
11	20 February	2 – 2 (2 – 4 SO)	Kalinga Lancers	Ranchi	Semi-final 2
12	21 February	0 – 2	Delhi Waveriders	Ranchi	4th Place
Position in League Phase: 3rd Place

- Goals For: 43 (4.03 per match)
- Goals Against: 35 (2.91 per match)

=== 2017 ===
No.	Date	Result	Opponent	Venue	Report
1	21 January	3 – 3	Dabang Mumbai	Mumbai	Match 1
2	23 January	2 – 4	Kalinga Lancers	Bhubaneswar	Match 3
3	26 January	7 – 2	Kalinga Lancers	Ranchi	Match 5
4	28 January	0 – 0	Delhi Waveriders	Ranchi	Match 7
5	1 February	0 – 7	Punjab Warriors	Ranchi	Match 11
6	2 February	7 – 3	Dabang Mumbai	Ranchi	Match 12

- Goals for: 12 (3 per match)
- Goals against: 9 (2.25 per match)
