= Kalinga Lancers =

Field hockey franchise team

- Full name: Kalinga Lancers
- Nickname(s): Lancers
- League: Hockey India League
- Founded: 2013
- Colors
- Home ground: Kalinga Stadium; Bhubaneswar, Odisha (Capacity 15,000)

Personnel
- Captain: (Belgium) Arthur Van Doren (India) Sanjay Rana
- Coach: (Australia) Jay Stacy
- Owner: Vedanta Aluminium
- CEO: C. Chandru (CEO, Vedanta Limited)
- Members: S. Suresh (CFO, Vedanta Aluminium Mines); Mansi Chauhan (Head, PR & Communications)
- Website: kalingalancers-vedanta.com

Performance
- Winners: 2017, 2025–26
- Runners-up: 2016
Home	Away

Kalinga Lancers (Odia: କଳିଙ୍ଗ ଲ୍ୟାନ୍ସର୍ସ) is an Indian professional field hockey franchise team based in Bhubaneswar, Odisha. Owned by Vedanta Aluminium, the franchise competes in the Hockey India League, the top flight of Indian field hockey.

== History ==
In their inaugural season in 2014, the Kalinga Lancers finished at the sixth spot at the end of league stage, and did not qualify for the semi-finals. Lancers also finished the 2015 edition in a similar fashion, finishing fifth at the end of the league stage.

In the 2016 Hockey India League, the Kalinga Lancers finished fourth at the end of league stage and advanced into the semi-finals for the first time, garnering 25 points from 10 games. In the semi-finals, the Lancers defeated Ranchi Rays 2–2 (4–2) to reach the Final. In the final, the Lancers faced Punjab Warriors which they lost 1–6, finishing the league as the runners-up.

In the 2017 Hockey India League, the Kalinga Lancers finished second at the end of league stage and advanced into the semi-finals garnering 28 points from 10 games. In the semi-finals, the Lancers defeated Uttar Pradesh Wizards 4–4 (4–3) to reach the Final. On 26 February 2017, Kalinga Lancers defeated Dabang Mumbai 4–1 in the final to win their first ever silverware.

Kalinga Lancers had a mixed campaign in the 2024–25 Hockey India League as they finished sixth in the league table with 12 points from 10 matches, recording three wins, one shoot-out win, five losses, and one shoot-out loss. The team scored 31 goals and conceded the same number, ending with a neutral goal difference. Thierry Brinkman emerged as their standout performer, netting 10 goals to finish among the league's top scorers. A series of narrow losses and missed opportunities in crucial games cost them a spot in the semifinals.

== Ownership ==
Since its establishment in 2013, the Kalinga Lancers hockey franchise was jointly owned by Mahanadi Coalfields and Odisha Industrial Infrastructure Development Corporation. Ahead of the 2024–25 Hockey India League season, the Vedanta Group acquired full ownership of the team.

== Stadium ==
Established in 2010, the Kalinga Hockey Stadium in Bhubaneswar, is the home ground of the Kalinga Lancers. The 16,000-capacity stadium has hosted several national and international tournaments including the Men's FIH Hockey World Cup, Hockey Champions Trophy, Men's FIH Hockey World League, FIH Hockey Series Finals, Men's FIH Hockey Junior World Cup, Men's FIH Pro League and Women's FIH Pro League. It was one of the venues to host the 2022 FIFA U-17 Women's World Cup. The stadium also serves as the home base for the men's national field hockey team, women's national field hockey team and youth national teams.

== Squad ==
As of 8 January 2026

No.	Player	Nationality	Signed	Salary
Goalkeepers
1	Jed Snowden	Australia	2025	₹10 lakh (US$11,000)
12	Krishan Pathak	India	2024	₹32 lakh (US$34,000)
Defenders
4	Arthur Van Doren	Belgium	2024	₹32 lakh (US$34,000)
15	Rohit Kullu	India	2024	₹2 lakh (US$2,100)
16	Alexander Hendrickx	Belgium	2024	₹23 lakh (US$25,000)
17	Sunil PB	India	2025	₹2 lakh (US$2,100)
20	Partap Lakra	India	2024	₹2 lakh (US$2,100)
24	Antoine Kina	Belgium	2024	₹16 lakh (US$17,000)
48	Dipsan Tirkey	India	2025	—N/a
70	Sanjay Rana	India	2024	₹38 lakh (US$41,000)
Midfielders
10	Liam Henderson	Australia	2025	₹42 lakh (US$45,000)
19	Craig Marais	Australia	2025	₹10 lakh (US$11,000)
21	Rosan Kujur	India	2024	₹12.5 lakh (US$13,000)
29	Rabichandra Singh Moirangthem	India	2024	₹32 lakh (US$34,000)
39	Amit Kumar Toppo	India	2025	₹2 lakh (US$2,100)
Forwards
5	Cooper Burns	Australia	2025	₹34.5 lakh (US$37,000)
7	Gursahibjit Singh	India	2024	₹6 lakh (US$6,400)
8	Boby Singh Dhami	India	2025	₹10 lakh (US$11,000)
9	Dilpreet Singh	India	2024	₹34 lakh (US$36,000)
26	Deepak Pradhan	India	2024	₹2 lakh (US$2,100)
99	Angad Bir Singh	India	2024	₹26 lakh (US$28,000)

== Personnel ==
=== Technical staff ===
As of 28 December 2025

Position	Name	Ref.
Head coach	(Australia) Jay Stacy	
Technical & Strategy Coach	(Belgium) Pascal Kina	
Assistant Coach	(India) B. J. Kariappa	
Team Manager	(India) Anjaparavanda B. Subbaiah	
Physiotherapist	(India) Boddhisattva Dass	
Physical Trainer	(India) Damanpreet Singh Sial	

=== Coaching history ===
Name	Nationality	Period
Terry Walsh	Australia	2014
Jude Felix Sebastian	India	2015
Mark Hager	Australia	2016–2017
Valentin Altenburg	Germany	2024
Jay Stacy	Australia	2025–

== Statistics ==
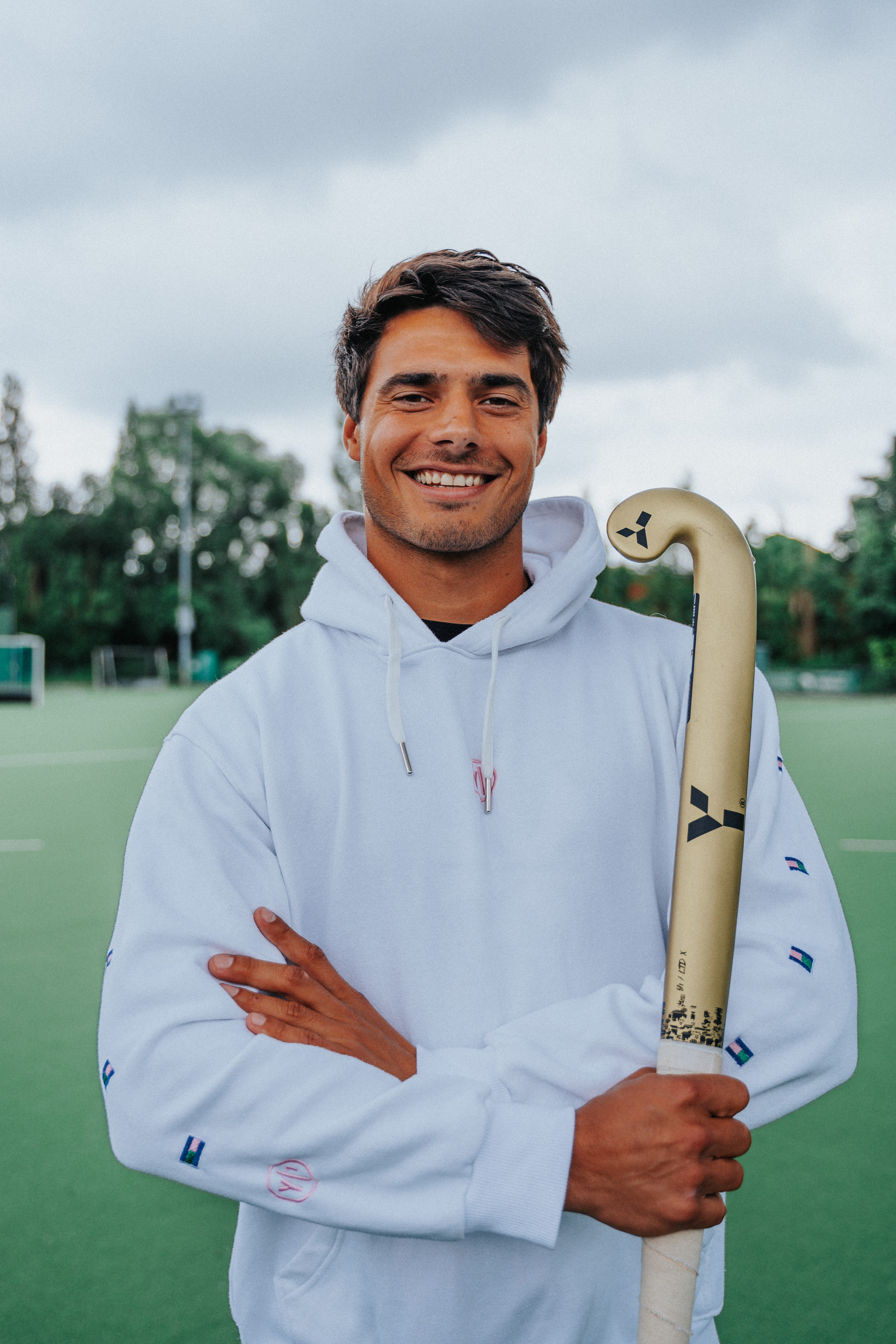
Alexander Hendrickx, Kalinga Lancers' all-time leading goalscorer with 19 goals to his name.

=== Overall ===
As of 26 January 2026

==== 2014–2017 ====
Season	Matches	Won	Drawn	Lost	GF	GA	Position
2014	10	2	1	7	23	34	6th
2015	10	3	1	6	17	26	5th
2016	12	5	1	6	42	44	Runners-Up
2017	12	7	1	4	40	45	Champions

==== 2024– ====
Season	Matches	Won	SOW	Lost	SOL	GF	GA	Position
2024–25	10	3	1	5	1	31	31	6th
2025–26	9	6	2	1	0	21	11	Champions

=== Performance by opposition ===
As of 26 January 2026

==== 2014–2017 ====
Opposition	Matches	Won	Drawn	Lost	GF	GA	Win%
Dabang Mumbai	7	5	0	2	23	14	71.4%
Delhi Waveriders	8	3	1	4	16	24	37.5%
Mumbai Magicians	2	1	0	1	4	4	50%
Punjab Warriors	9	2	2	5	24	32	22.2%
Ranchi Rays	7	3	0	4	18	24	42.8%
Ranchi Rhinos	2	1	0	1	6	4	50%
Uttar Pradesh Wizards	9	2	1	6	28	33	22.2%

==== 2024– ====
Opposition	Matches	Won	SOW	Lost	SOL	GF	GA	Win%
Delhi SG Pipers	3	2	1	0	0	16	7	100%
HIL Governing Council	1	0	1	0	0	1	1	100%
Hyderabad Toofans	2	1	0	1	0	2	5	50%
Rarh Bengal Tigers	3	2	0	1	0	11	6	67%
Ranchi Royals	3	3	0	0	0	9	5	100%
Soorma Hockey Club	3	0	0	3	0	7	11	0%
Tamil Nadu Dragons	1	0	1	0	1	3	3	50%
Team Gonasika	1	1	0	0	0	2	1	100%
UP Rudras	1	0	0	1	0	1	3	0%

=== Top goalscorers ===
As of 26 January 2026

Rank	Player	Nationality	Goals
1	Alexander Hendrickx	Belgium	19
2	Glenn Turner	Australia	15
3	Moritz Fürste	Germany	11
4	Thierry Brinkman	Netherlands	10
5	Gonzalo Peillat	Argentina	8
5	Gurjinder Singh	India	8
6	Lalit Upadhyay	India	6
6	Lucas Vila	Argentina	6

== Seasons ==
=== 2014 ===
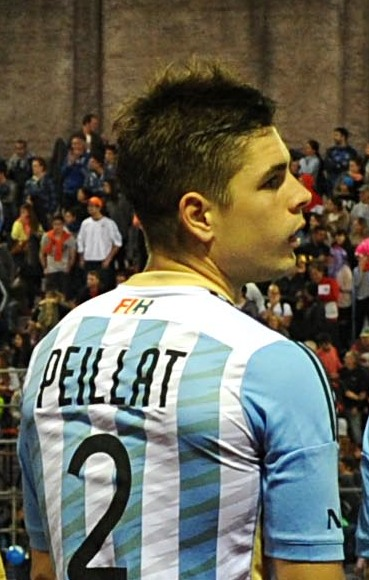
Gonzalo Peillat was the top scorer in Kalinga Lancers' inaugural season in 2014.

No.	Date	Result	Opponent	Venue	Report
1	28 January	3 – 7	Punjab Warriors	Bhubaneswar	Match 5
2	30 January	5 – 0	Delhi Waveriders	Delhi	Match 7
3	1 February	2 – 1	Mumbai Magicians	Bhubaneswar	Match 10
4	2 February	3 – 4	Delhi Waveriders	Bhubaneswar	Match 12
5	7 February	3 – 2	Ranchi Rhinos	Ranchi	Match 16
6	9 February	3 – 1	Uttar Pradesh Wizards	Lucknow	Match 19
7	11 February	3 – 3	Punjab Warriors	Mohali	Match 21
8	13 February	3 – 4	Uttar Pradesh Wizards	Bhubaneswar	Match 23
9	14 February	4 – 1	Ranchi Rhinos	Bhubaneswar	Match 24
10	16 February	3 – 2	Mumbai Magicians	Mumbai	Match 27
Position: 6th

- Goals for: 23 (2.30 per match)
- Goals against: 34 (3.40 per match)
- Most goals: 8
  - Gonzalo Peillat

=== 2015 ===
No.	Date	Result	Opponent	Venue	Report
1	22 January	6 – 3	Ranchi Rays	Bhubaneswar	Match 1
2	25 January	4 – 2	Punjab Warriors	Mohali	Match 5
3	29 January	5 – 1	Uttar Pradesh Wizards	Lucknow	Match 9
4	31 January	0 – 2	Uttar Pradesh Wizards	Bhubaneswar	Match 11
5	1 February	1 – 3	Punjab Warriors	Bhubaneswar	Match 13
6	6 February	4 – 0	Ranchi Rays	Ranchi	Match 17
7	8 February	2 – 1	Dabang Mumbai	Mumbai	Match 20
8	12 February	2 – 2	Delhi Waveriders	Bhubaneswar	Match 23
9	13 February	2 – 1	Dabang Mumbai	Bhubaneswar	Match 24
10	15 February	1 – 2	Delhi Waveriders	New Delhi	Match 27
Position: 5th

- Goals for: 17 (1.70 per match)
- Goals against: 26 (2.60 per match)
- Most goals: 5
  - Gurjinder Singh

=== 2016 ===
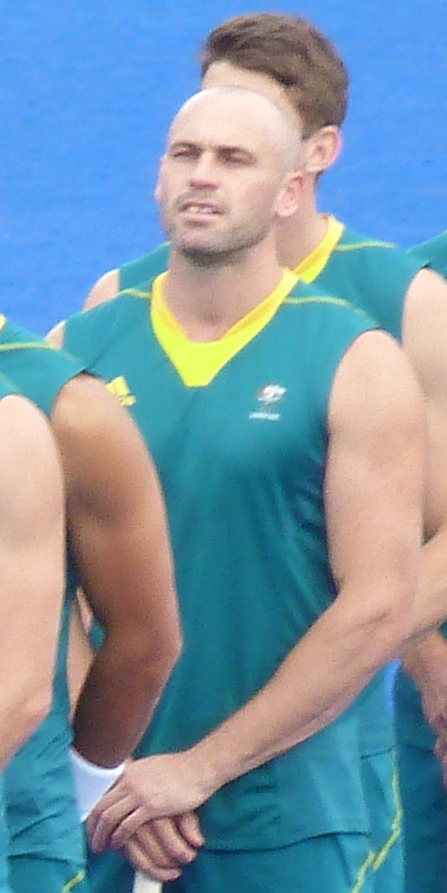
Glenn Turner, Kalinga Lancers' top scorer in 2016 and 2017 HIL editions.

No.	Date	Result	Opponent	Venue	Report
1	18 January	6 – 8	Uttar Pradesh Wizards	Bhubaneswar	Match 1
2	21 January	4 – 2	Dabang Mumbai	Bhubaneswar	Match 4
3	25 January	2 – 10	Uttar Pradesh Wizards	Lucknow	Match 8
4	28 January	3 – 2	Ranchi Rays	Ranchi	Match 10
5	31 January	4 – 6	Dabang Mumbai	Mumbai	Match 13
6	5 February	4 – 0	Delhi Waveriders	Bhubaneswar	Match 18
7	7 February	1 – 4	Punjab Warriors	Bhubaneswar	Match 20
8	8 February	2 – 3	Ranchi Rays	Bhubaneswar	Match 21
9	15 February	4 – 4	Punjab Warriors	Mohali	Match 28
10	17 January	6 – 0	Delhi Waveriders	New Delhi	Match 30
11	20 February	2 – 2 (2 – 4)	Ranchi Rays	Ranchi	Semi-final 2
12	21 February	1 – 6	Punjab Warriors	Ranchi	Final
Position: Runners-Up

- Goals for: 42 (3.5 per match)
- Goals against: 44 (3.6 per match)
- Most goals: 15
  - Glenn Turner

=== 2017 ===
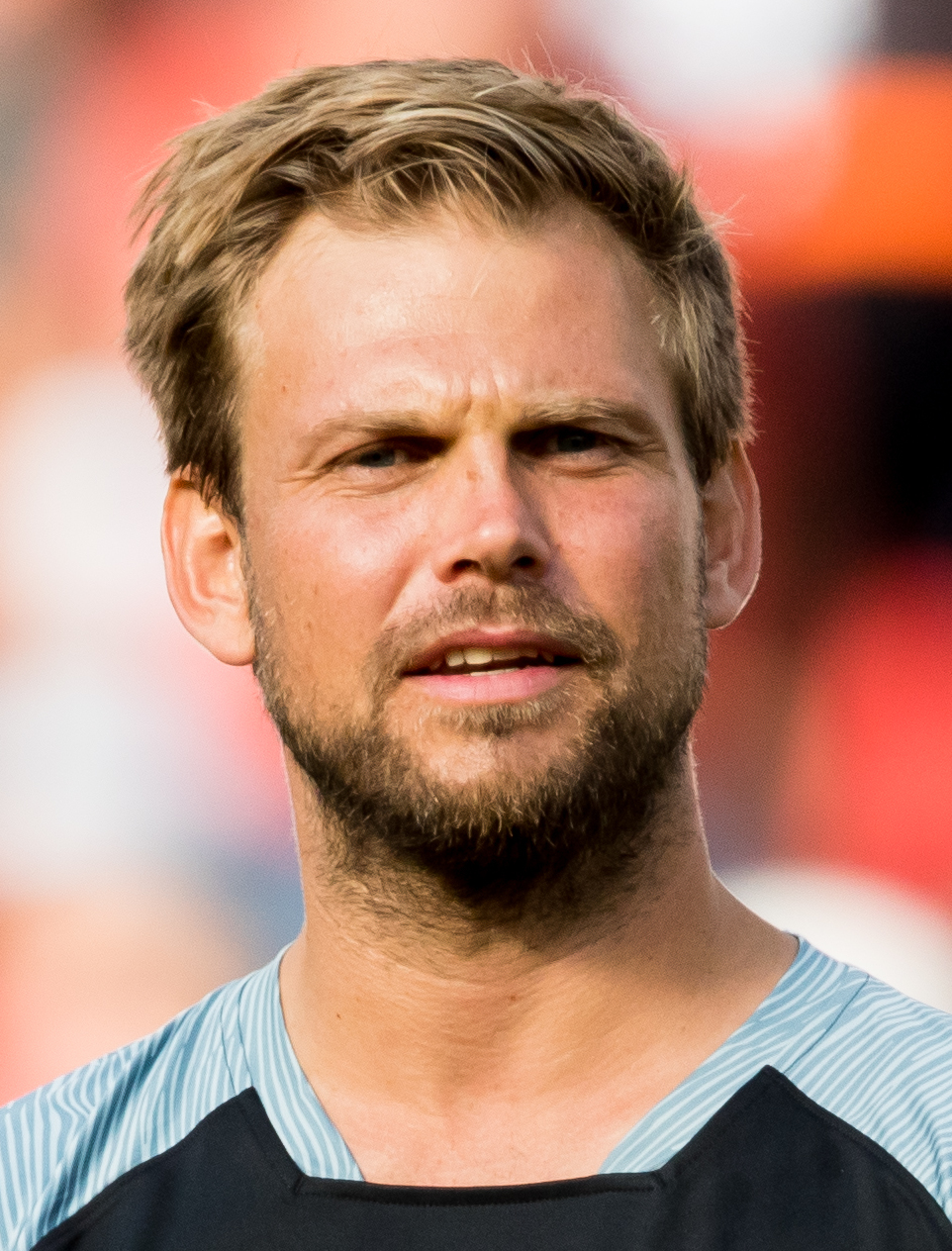
Moritz Fürste captained the Kalinga Lancers side in their title winning 2017 HIL season and ended up as the top scorer of the edition.

No.	Date	Result	Opponent	Venue	Report
1	22 January	1 – 0	Delhi Waveriders	Bhubaneswar	Match 2
2	23 January	4 – 2	Ranchi Rays	Bhubaneswar	Match 3
3	26 January	7 – 2	Ranchi Rays	Ranchi	Match 5
4	29 January	0 – 10	Uttar Pradesh Wizards	Bhubaneswar	Match 8
5	31 January	3 – 4	Dabang Mumbai	Mumbai	Match 10
6	3 February	6 – 5	Punjab Warriors	Bhubaneswar	Match 13
7	5 February	2 – 5	Dabang Mumbai	Bhubaneswar	Match 15
8	10 February	2 – 2	Uttar Pradesh Wizards	Lucknow	Match 19
9	12 February	6 – 4	Delhi Waveriders	New Delhi	Match 21
10	18 February	0 – 7	Punjab Warriors	Chandigarh	Match 26
11	25 February	4 – 4 (4 – 3)	Uttar Pradesh Wizards	Chandigarh	Semi-final 1
12	26 February	4 – 1	Dabang Mumbai	Chandigarh	Final
Position: Champions

- Goals for: 40 (3.3 per match)
- Goals against: 45 (3.7 per match)
- Most Goals: 12
  - Glenn Turner
  - Moritz Fürste

=== 2024–25 ===
No.	Date	Result	Opponent	Venue	Report
1	30 December	1 – 3	UP Rudras	Rourkela	Match 4
2	3 January	2 – 2 (5 – 6)	Tamil Nadu Dragons	Rourkela	Match 8
3	5 January	3 – 4	Soorma Hockey Club	Rourkela	Match 11
4	7 January	6 – 0	Rarh Bengal Tigers	Rourkela	Match 14
5	9 January	2 – 1	Team Gonasika	Rourkela	Match 17
6	12 January	1 – 5	Hyderabad Toofans	Rourkela	Match 21
7	16 January	5 – 1	Delhi SG Pipers	Rourkela	Match 25
8	19 January	5 – 5 (3 – 2)	Delhi SG Pipers	Rourkela	Match 29
9	24 January	3 – 5	Rarh Bengal Tigers	Ranchi	Match 34
10	27 January	1 – 2	Soorma Hockey Club	Ranchi	Match 38
Position: 6th

- Goals for: 31 (3.10 per match)
- Goals against: 31 (3.10 per match)
- Most goals: 10
  - Thierry Brinkman

=== 2025–26 ===
No.	Date	Result	Opponent	Venue	Report
1	4 January	4 – 2	Ranchi Royals	Chennai	Match 3
2	8 January	2 – 1	Rarh Bengal Tigers	Chennai	Match 8
3	11 January	1 – 1 (3 – 1)	HIL Governing Council	Ranchi	Match 11
4	14 January	1 – 0	Hyderabad Toofans	Ranchi	Match 16
5	17 January	6 – 1	Delhi SG Pipers	Bhubaneswar	Match 21
6	18 January	1 – 1 (4 – 1)	Tamil Nadu Dragons	Bhubaneswar	Match 23
7	20 January	1 – 2	Soorma Hockey Club	Bhubaneswar	Match 26
8	23 January	2 – 1	Ranchi Royals	Bhubaneswar	Qualifier 1
9	26 January	3 – 2	Ranchi Royals	Bhubaneswar	Final
Position: Champions

- Goals for: 21 (2.33 per match)
- Goals against: 11 (1.22 per match)
- Most goals: 12
  - Alexander Hendrickx
