= Krishan Bahadur Pathak =

Indian field hockey player

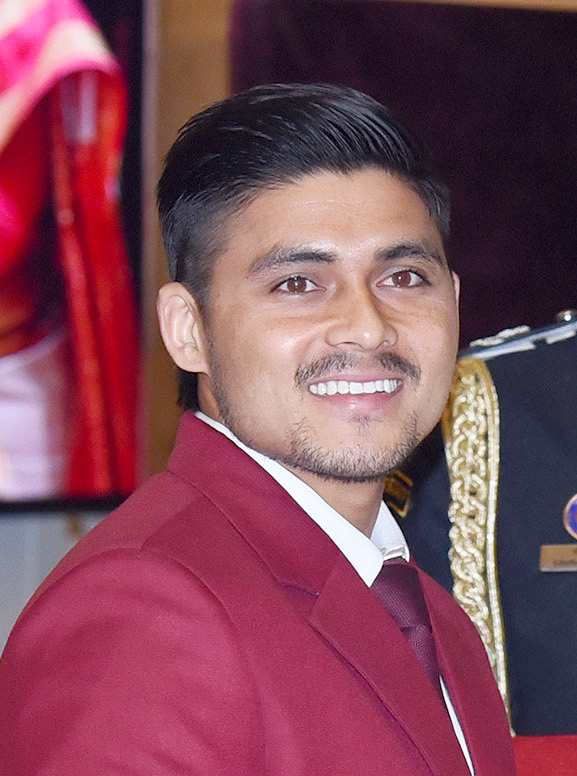
- Krishan Pathak in 2024

Personal information
- Born: 24 April 1997 (age 29) Kapurthala, Punjab, India
- Height: 1.7 m (5 ft 7 in)

Sport
- Sport: Field hockey
- Position: Goalkeeper
Senior career
Years	Team	Caps	Goals
–	Hockey Punjab	-	-
–	Petroleum Sports Promotion Board	-	-
–	Indian Oil Corporation	-	-
2024–	Kalinga Lancers	-	-
National team
Years	Team	Caps	Goals
2016	India U21	1	(0)
2018–	India	163	(0)
Medal record
Men's field hockey
Representing India
Champions Trophy
Silver medal – second place	2018 Breda
Asian Games
Gold medal – first place	2022 Hangzhou	Team
Bronze medal – third place	2018 Jakarta	Team
Asia Cup
Gold medal – first place	2025 Rajgir
Asian Champions Trophy
Gold medal – first place	2018 Muscat
Gold medal – first place	2023 Chennai
Gold medal – first place	2024 Hulunbuir
Gold medal – first place	2026 Punjab
Bronze medal – third place	2021 Dhaka
Commonwealth Games
Silver medal – second place	2022 Birmingham	Team
Junior World Cup
Gold medal – first place	2016 Lucknow

Krishan Bahadur Pathak (born 24 April 1997) is an Indian field hockey player who plays as a goalkeeper for the Indian national team.

== Early life ==
Pathak was born on 24 April 1997 in Kapurthala, Punjab. He is of Nepalese descent; his parents migrated from Lugdi village in Nepal to Punjab in 1990. Despite not being interested in the sport, Pathak joined the Surjit Hockey Academy in Jalandhar when he was 12 at the insistence of his father. Pathak's mother died when he was 12, while his father Tek Bahadur Pathak, a crane operator, died of a heart attack in 2016.

== Career ==
Pathak was part of the Indian junior team that won the 2016 Men's Hockey Junior World Cup in Lucknow. He was then selected in the India A team for the 2017 Men's Australian Hockey League. He made his India senior team debut in January 2018, when the team participated in a four-team invitational tournament in New Zealand. Pathak found a place in the squad for 2018 Sultan Azlan Shah Cup as India's first-choice goalkeeper P. R. Sreejesh was rested. He then played as a reserve goalkeeper in the 2018 Men's Hockey Champions Trophy, where India won the silver medal, and the 2018 Asian Games, where India won bronze.

Pathak was the reserve goalkeeper at the 2020 Olympic Games in Tokyo, where India won the bronze medal. He was part of India's gold medal winning team at the 2022 Asian Games in Hangzhou.

Following Sreejesh's retirement in 2024, Pathak became the primary goalkeeper of India. In January 2026, Pathak was one of the three players dropped from the Indian team due to alleged disciplinary issues. He made his comeback during the 2026 Men's Asian Champions Trophy in October 2026.

== Award ==
Krishan Pathak received the Arjuna Award from the President of India on 9 January 2024.
