= Gurmail Singh (field hockey, born 1992) =

Indian field hockey player (born 1992)

Personal information
- Born: 30 December 1992 (age 33) Sant Nagar, Sirsa, Haryana, India

Sport
- Sport: Field hockey
- Position: Defender
National team
Years	Team	Caps	Goals
2013–2015	India		-
Medal record
Men's field hockey
Representing India
Asia Cup
Silver medal – second place	2013 Ipoh	Team

Gurmail Singh (born 30 December 1992) is an Indian field hockey player who plays as a defender.
