= Akash Chikte =

Indian field hockey player (born 1992)

Personal information
- Born: 24 July 1992 (age 34) Yavatmal, Maharashtra, India

Sport
- Sport: Field hockey
- Position: Goalkeeper
National team
Years	Team	Caps	Goals
2016–	India		-
Medal record
Asia Cup
Gold medal – first place	2017 Dhaka
Asian Champions Trophy
Gold medal – first place	2016 Kuantan
Hockey World League
Bronze medal – third place	2016–17 Bhubaneswar	Team

Akash Anil Chikte (born 24 July 1992) is an Indian field hockey player who plays as a goalkeeper. He was part of the Indian squad that won the gold medal at the 2016 Asian Men's Hockey Champions Trophy.
