= Mohammad Amir Khan (field hockey) =

Indian field hockey player

Personal information
- Born: 29 December 1993 (age 32) Allahabad, Uttar Pradesh, India

Sport
- Sport: Field hockey
- Position: Forward
Senior career
Years	Team	Caps	Goals
2016–present	Ranchi Rays	-	-
National team
Years	Team	Caps	Goals
2009–present	India	33	(7)
Medal record
Men's field hockey
Representing India
Hockey World League
Bronze medal – third place	2014–15 Raipur	Team
- Updated on 3 February 2017

Mohammad Amir Khan (born 29 December 1993) is an Indian field hockey player who plays as a forward. He represented India at the 2009 Men's Hockey Junior World Cup and made his senior team debut later that year at the age of 16.
