= Gurjinder Singh (field hockey) =

Indian field hockey player (born 1994)

Personal information
- Born: 1 April 1994 (age 32) Sangatpur, Gurdaspur district, Punjab, India
- Height: 6 ft (183 cm)

Sport
- Sport: Field hockey
- Position: Defender
National team
Years	Team	Caps	Goals
2013–2015	India		-
- Updated on 5 August 2017

Gurjinder Singh (born 1 April 1994) is an Indian field hockey player who plays as a defender.

Gurjinder was the leading goal-scorer and player of the tournament of the 2012 World Series Hockey with 19 goals. The following year, he was picked for the national team for the first time for the FIH Hockey World League Round 2. He was part of the Indian junior squad at the 2013 Men's Hockey Junior World Cup and the senior squad at the 2014 Men's Hockey Champions Trophy.
