= Sarvanjit Singh =

Indian field hockey player

Personal information
- Born: 3 July 1988 (age 38) Marar, Gurdaspur, India

Sport
- Sport: Field hockey
Senior career
Years	Team	Caps	Goals
–	Chandigarh Comets	-	-
–present	Ranchi Rays	-	-
National team
Years	Team	Caps	Goals
–present	India		-
Medal record
Representing India
Commonwealth Games
Silver medal – second place	2010 Delhi	Team
Asian Games
Bronze medal – third place	2010 Guangzhou	Team
Asian Champions Trophy
Gold medal – first place	2011 Ordos City

Sarvanjit Singh is an Indian field hockey player who was a part of India Men's Hockey Team, as a forward, during the 2012 London Olympics.

== Early life ==
Singh hails from Gurdaspur town in Punjab, India.

== Career ==
=== Hockey India League ===
Sarvanjit Singh plays for Ranchi Rays in the Hockey India League.

== Career achievements ==
- Sarvanjit Singh was member of Indian Olympic squad for 2012 Olympics.
- Sarvanjit Singh was the captain of Punjab Team which was crowned champion in Senior National Championship 2012.
