= Kothajit Singh Khadangbam =

Indian field hockey player

Kothajit Singh
Personal information
- Full name: Kothajit Singh Khadangbam
- Born: 17 August 1992 (age 34) Imphal East, India
- Height: 170 cm (5 ft 7 in)

Sport
- Sport: Field hockey
- Position: Defender / Midfielder
National team
Years	Team	Caps	Goals
2012–	India	207	(4)
Medal record
Men's field hockey
Asian Games
Gold medal – first place	2014 Incheon	Team
Asia Cup
Silver medal – second place	2013 Ipoh
Champions Trophy
Silver medal – second place	2016 London
Asian Champions Trophy
Gold medal – first place	2016 Kuantan
Gold medal – first place	2018 Muscat
Silver medal – second place	2012 Doha
World League
Bronze medal – third place	2014–15 Raipur	Team
Bronze medal – third place	2016–17 Bhubaneswar	Team
Commonwealth Games
Silver medal – second place	2014 Glasgow	Team

Kothajit Singh Khadangbam (Meitei: Khadangbam Kothajit Singh, born 17 August 1992) is an India field hockey player who plays as a defender or midfielder for the Indian national team.

== Career ==
He represented India in Men's Hockey during the 2012 London Olympics. He is the third hockey Olympian - after Pangambam Nilakomol Singh and Ksh. Thoiba - from the state of Manipur, known for producing a disproportionate number of international-standard sportspersons. He was a member of the silver medal-winning Indian team at the 2014 Commonwealth Games in Glasgow, Scotland.

He was a member of India's gold medal-winning hockey team at the 2014 Asian Games in Incheon, South Korea. He was India's only goal-scorer in regular time, which ended 1–1 against silver medalist Pakistan. India won 4–2 in a penalty shootout.
