= Birsa Munda Hockey Stadium =

Field hockey stadium in Jharkhand, India

- Astroturf Hockey Stadium
- Interactive map of Birsa Munda Hockey Stadium
- Former names: Ranchi Hockey Stadium
- Location: Ranchi, Jharkhand, India
- Coordinates: 23°23′20″N 85°19′45″E
- Owner: Government of Jharkhand
- Capacity: 5,000

Construction
- Opened: 1991
- Renovated: 21 November 2009

Tenants
- Ranchi Rhinos (2012–2014); Ranchi Rays (2015–present)

Birsa Munda Hockey Stadium or Ranchi Hockey Stadium is a field hockey stadium in Ranchi, Jharkhand. It serves as the home ground for Hockey India League franchise Ranchi Rays.

It is located in Morabadi near Ranchi and has a capacity of approximately 5000. This was also the home ground of Hockey India League team Ranchi Rhinos.

Initially built in 1990 then subsequently renovated. It was inaugurated by then Governor of Jharkhand K Sankaranarayanan as a prelude to the 34th National Games scheduled to be organized in Jharkhand from 21 November 2009.

The stadium was constructed at a cost of around Rs 7 crore. It has floodlights for day and night matches, a video screen for live event coverage, and an electronic scoreboard. The astro turf has been imported from Germany.

== See also ==
- Hockey India League
