= Dabang Mumbai =

Field hockey team

- Full name: Dabang Mumbai
- Nickname(s): The Alphas
- Founded: 2014
- Home ground: Mahindra Hockey Stadium; Mumbai, India (Capacity 8,000)

Dabang Mumbai was a professional field hockey team based in Mumbai, Maharashtra, India that played in Hockey India League. The team was owned by Do It Sports.

== 2017 squad ==
Player	Nationality
Goalkeepers
David Harte	Ireland
Krishan Pathak	India
Defenders
Sander de Wijn	Netherlands
Jeremy Hayward	Australia
Gurmail Singh	India
Harmanpreet Singh	India
Emmanuel Stockbroekx	Belgium
Midfielders
Manpreet Jr	India
Tyron Pereira	India
Nilakanta Sharma	India
Vikas Sharma	India
Forwards
Johan Bjorkman	Sweden
Florian Fuchs	Germany
Kieran Govers	Australia
Robbert Kemperman	Netherlands
Roshan Minz	India
Danish Mujtaba	India
Gurjant Singh	India
Nikkin Thimmaiah	India
Affan Yousuf	India

== Fixtures ==
=== 2015 ===
No.	Date	Opponent	Venue
1	23 January	JPW	Mumbai
2	24 January	RR	Mumbai
3	28 January	RR	Ranchi
4	1 February	DWR	Delhi
5	5 February	DWR	Mumbai
6	8 February	KL	Mumbai
7	11 February	UPW	Mumbai
8	13 February	KL	Bhubaneswar
9	15 February	UPW	Lucknow
10	19 February	JPW	Mohali

== Kit manufacturers and sponsors ==
Year	Kit manufacturers	Sponsor
2015	N/A	Videocon D2H
2016	TK Sports	Manipal University (MAHE)
