= Hockey India League =

Indian professional field hockey league

- Most recent season or competition: 2025–26 Hockey India League
- Founded: 2013; 13 years ago
- First season: 2013
- Administrator: Hockey India
- No. of teams: M: 8 W: 4
- Country: India
- Headquarters: New Delhi
- Most recent champions: M: Kalinga Lancers (2nd title); W: SG Pipers (1st title) (2025–26)
- Most titles: M: Kalinga Lancers (2 titles); W: Odisha Warriors; SG Pipers (1 title each)
- Tournament format: Round-robin tournament; Knock-out
- Website: Website
- 2025–26 Hockey India League

Hockey India League is a professional field hockey league in India. It is organized by Hockey India, the governing body for the sport in India. It is considered one of the major sports leagues of the country.

It was founded in 2013 as a part of Hockey India's attempt to develop an International Hockey Federation sanctioned league after the un-sanctioned World Series Hockey, began in 2012. The first season took place in 2013. It proved to be a financial success for Hockey India, who were in financial disarray before the league began. In 2015, it was reported that the federation earned a profit from multiple revenues.

The most recent champions of the league are SG Pipers Hockey in the women's edition and Kalinga Lancers in the men's edition.

== History ==
The first event in the league format in India was a hockey league named the Premier Hockey League organised by ESPN-Star Sports, Indian Hockey Federation and Leisure Sports Management from 2005 to 2008. It was based on the model of NBA league. It was a pioneer in Indian sports which inspired the Indian Premier League and many others that followed.

Later in 2012, the Indian Hockey Federation and Nimbus began World Series Hockey, a professional field hockey league in India. After the success of the league, Hockey India announced the formation of their own franchise-based league, launched in mid-2012, known as the Hockey India League. The league was approved by the International Hockey Federation. The league was originally planned to have six teams, which would be established after the bidding was done for the twelve proposed cities that would host an HIL team. However, due to lack of interest in a sixth city, the league commenced in 2013 with five teams. Before the beginning of the season, ESPN STAR Sports was announced as the league's official broadcasting partner on a five-year deal.

The first match was played on 14 January 2013, as Delhi Waveriders defeated the Punjab Warriors 2–1 at the Dhyan Chand National Stadium. The league had gained some buzz from the marquee signings of India internationals Sardara Singh and Sandeep Singh, as well as the signings of foreign players such as Jamie Dwyer, Moritz Fürste, and Teun de Nooijer. The inaugural season ended with Ranchi Rhinos being the first champions, defeating the Delhi Waveriders 2–1 in the final. The league was considered a success immediately in the years following the inaugural season.

Before the beginning of the second season, Kalinga Lancers were announced as the sixth team in the Hockey India League. However, after the 2014 season, the league suffered its first setback when the Mumbai Magicians disbanded. The team was swiftly replaced though with Dabang Mumbai being launched before the 2015 season. The league though suffered another setback before the 2015 season when Ranchi Rhinos, the inaugural champions, were disbanded after an ownership problem. The team though, like with Mumbai, was quickly replaced with Ranchi Rays.

Seven years later, Hockey India League was revived with its 2024–25 edition.

== Format ==
Previously, HIL used to consist of six teams, with the regular season from January to February, each team playing 10 games. The top four teams at the end of the season move into the play-offs, where the game decides the Hockey India League winner.

Since 2024, the teams have been expanded to eight. Meanwhile, the league's addition of the women's tournament will see six teams in its inaugural edition.

If there is a tie in any match then there would be extra time. Still, if winner is not decided, there would be a shoot-out. If still the winner is not decided there would be no option left other than penalty strokes.

== Teams ==
Locations of HIL teams
Men's
Women's
Both

Men's
Team	City	Debut	Head Coach
SG Pipers	New Delhi	2024	(Netherlands) Tim Oudenaller
HIL Governing Council	Lucknow	2026	(Netherlands) Paul van Ass
Hyderabad Toofans	Hyderabad	2024	(Netherlands) Pasha Gademan
Kalinga Lancers	Bhubaneswar	2014	(Australia) Jay Stacy
Ranchi Royals	Ranchi	2026	(India) Tushar Khandker
Rarh Bengal Tigers	Kolkata	2024	(Germany) Valentin Altenburg
Soorma Hockey Club	Punjab	2024	(Belgium) Philippe Goldberg
Tamil Nadu Dragons	Chennai	2024	(Australia) Tim White

Women's
Team	City	Debut	Head Coach
SG Pipers	New Delhi	2025	(Belgium) Sofie Gierts
Ranchi Royals	Ranchi	2025	(India) Harendra Singh
Rarh Bengal Tigers	Kolkata	2025	(India) Deepak Thakur
Soorma Hockey Club	Haryana	2025	(India) Jude Menezes

=== Defunct teams ===
Team	City	Years active
Mumbai Magicians	Mumbai	2013–2014
Ranchi Rhinos	Ranchi	2013–2014
Uttar Pradesh Wizards	Lucknow	2013–2017
Delhi Waveriders	New Delhi	2013–2017
Punjab Warriors	Chandigarh	2013–2017
Dabang Mumbai	Mumbai	2015–2017
Ranchi Rays	Ranchi	2015–2017
Team Gonasika	Visakhapatnam	2024–2025
UP Rudras	Lucknow	2024–2025
Odisha Warriors	Rourkela	2025

== Auction record ==
Most expensive men's players
Season	Player	Amount	Team	Ref
2024–25	Harmanpreet Singh	₹78 lakhs	Soorma Hockey Club	
2024–25	Abhishek Nain	₹72 lakhs	Rarh Bengal Tigers	
2024–25	Hardik Singh	₹70 lakhs	UP Rudras	
2024–25	Gonzalo Peillat	₹68 lakhs	Hyderabad Toofans	
2024–25	Jip Janssen	₹54 lakhs	Tamil Nadu Dragons	

Most expensive women's players
Season	Player	Amount	Team	Ref
2025	Udita Duhan	₹32 lakhs	Rarh Bengal Tigers	
2025	Yibbi Jansen	₹29 lakhs	Odisha Warriors	
2025	Lalremsiami	₹25 lakhs	Rarh Bengal Tigers	
2025	Sunelita Toppo	₹24 lakhs	Delhi SG Pipers	
2025	Sangita Kumari	₹22 lakhs	Delhi SG Pipers	

== Editions and results ==
Men's
Season	Winner	Score	Runner up	Venue	Teams	Player of the Tournament
2013	Ranchi Rhinos	2–1	Delhi Waveriders	Birsa Munda Hockey Stadium	5	Sardara Singh from Delhi Waveriders
2014	Delhi Waveriders	3–3 (s.o. 3–1)	Punjab Warriors	Birsa Munda Hockey Stadium	6	Jaap Stockmann from Punjab Warriors
2015	Ranchi Rays	2–2 (s.o. 3–2)	Punjab Warriors	Major Dhyan Chand National Stadium	6	Ashley Jackson from Ranchi Rays
2016	Punjab Warriors	6–1	Kalinga Lancers	Birsa Munda Hockey Stadium	6	Rupinder Pal Singh from Delhi Waveriders
2017	Kalinga Lancers	4–1	Dabang Mumbai	Chandigarh Hockey Stadium	6	Florian Fuchs from Dabang Mumbai
2024–25	Rarh Bengal Tigers	4–3	Hyderabad Toofans	Birsa Munda International Hockey Stadium	8	Sukhjeet Singh from Rarh Bengal Tigers
2026	Kalinga Lancers	3–2	Ranchi Royals	Kalinga Stadium	8	Amandeep Lakra from Hyderabad Toofans

Women's
Season	Winner	Score	Runner up	Venue	Teams	Player of the Tournament
2025	Odisha Warriors	2–1	Soorma Hockey Club	Jaipal Singh Stadium	4	Jyoti Rumavat from Soorma Hockey Club
2025–26	SG Pipers	1–1 (s.o. 3–2)	Bengal Tigers	Jaipal Singh Stadium	4	Navneet Kaur from SG Pipers

== Performance by teams ==
=== By season ===
Men's
Team	2013	2014	2015	2016	2017	2024–25	2025–26
Delhi SG Pipers						8th	
HIL Governing Council							4th
Hyderabad Toofans						RU	3rd
Kalinga Lancers		6th	5th	RU	C	6th	C
Ranchi Royals							RU
Rarh Bengal Tigers						C	7th
Soorma Hockey Club						3rd	5th
Tamil Nadu Dragons						4th	6th
Defunct Teams
Ranchi Rhinos	C	3rd					
Mumbai Magicians	5th						
Uttar Pradesh Wizards	3rd	4th		6th	3rd		
Delhi Waveriders	RU	C	3rd		4th		
Punjab Warriors	4th	RU		C	6th		
Dabang Mumbai			6th	5th	RU		
Ranchi Rays			C	4th	5th		
Team Gonasika						7th	
UP Rudras						5th	

Women's
Team	2024–25	2025–26
Delhi SG Pipers	4th	C
Ranchi Royals		3rd
Rarh Bengal Tigers	3rd	RU
Soorma Hockey Club	RU	4th
Defunct Teams
Odisha Warriors	C	

=== League positions ===
Men's
Season	1st	2nd	3rd	4th	5th	6th	7th	8th
2013	DWR	RRH	UPW	PW	MM			
2014	PW	DWR	UPW	RRH	MM	KL		
2015	PW	RRA	UPW	DWR	KL	DM		
2016	RRA	PW	DWR	KL	DM	UPW		
2017	DM	KL	UPW	DWR	RRA	PW		
2024–25	RBT	SHC	HT	TND	UPR	KL	TG	DSGP
2025–26	KL	RR	HT	HILGC	SHC	TND	RBT	DSGP

Women's
Season	1st	2nd	3rd	4th	5th	6th
2024–25	SHC	OW	RBT	DSGP		
2025–26	DSGP	RBT	RR	SHC		

Key
Champions
Runners Up
Third Place
Playoffs

== Sponsorship ==
Period	Sponsor	Tournament Name
2013–2015	Hero	Hero Hockey India League
2016–2017	Coal India	Coal India Hockey India League
2024–present	Hero	Hero Hockey India League

== Prize money ==
=== Men's HIL ===
- Winning Team: ₹3 crore
- 2nd Place: ₹2 crore
- 3rd Place: ₹1 crore
- Best Goalkeeper: ₹10 lakhs
- Top Scorer: ₹10 lakhs
- Up-and-Coming Player: ₹10 lakhs
- Player of the Tournament: ₹20 lakhs each
- Player of every Match: ₹0.5 lakh each

=== Women's HIL ===
- Winning Team: ₹1.5 crore
- 2nd Place: ₹1.5 crore
- 3rd Place: ₹50 lakhs
- Best Goalkeeper: ₹5 lakhs
- Top Scorer: ₹5 lakhs
- Up-and-Coming Player: ₹5 lakhs
- Player of the Tournament: ₹20 lakhs each
- Player of every Match: ₹0.5 lakh each

Source: The Hindu

== Board ==
Before the league's first season, Hockey India appointed Steve Catton as competitions director. Minister of State for Parliamentary Affairs Rajeev Shukla, leader of the opposition in Rajya Sabha, Arun Jaitley, and media personality Rajat Sharma are the members of the board for the Hockey India League. Along with Steve Catton, Barry Anderson was appointed as the tournament director.

Hockey India appointed Todd Faulds as its competitions director for the second edition of the Hockey India League. He previously worked as a competitions manager for the FIH 2012 Men's Champions Trophy in Melbourne and 2012 International Super Series in Perth.

Bjorn Isberg has been the Hockey India League tournament director since 2014. Isberg had served as tournament director for the 2012 London Olympics field hockey tournament, and three Champions Trophy tournaments (in 2004, 2007, and 2011).

== See also ==
- Sports in India
- Field hockey in India
- Premier Hockey League
- World Series Hockey
