= 2024 Men's FIH Hockey Olympic Qualifiers squads =

This article lists the confirmed squads for the 2024 Men's FIH Hockey Olympic Qualifiers tournament, held in Muscat, Oman and Valencia, Spain between 13 and 21 January 2024. The sixteen national teams were required to register a playing squad of eighteen players and two reserves.

== Tournament 1 ==
=== Canada ===
Head coach: (South Africa) Patrick Tshutshani

Canada announced their final squad on 13 December 2023.

1. Floris van Son
5. Devohn Noronha-Teixeira
8. Oliver Scholfield
10. Keegan Pereira
11. Balraj Panesar
13. Brendan Guraliuk
14. Manveer Jhamat
16. Gordon Johnston (C)
17. Brenden Bissett
20. Fin Boothroyd
21. Matthew Sarmento
24. James Kirkpatrick
25. Harbir Sidhu
26. Samuel Cabral
29. Taylor Curran
30. Ethan McTavish (GK)
32. Zachary Coombs (GK)
33. Thomson Harris

=== Chile ===
Head coach: (Spain) Jorge Dabanch

1. Agustín Araya (GK)
2. Agustín Amoroso
5. Adrián Henríquez (GK)
6. Vicente Goñi
9. José Maldonado (C)
11. Kay Gesswein
13. Andrés Pizarro (C)
15. José Hurtado
17. Felipe Renz
18. Ignacio Contardo
20. Raimundo Valenzuela
25. Agustín Valenzuela
26. Axel Troncoso
27. Sebastián Wolansky
28. Nils Strabucchi
30. Álvaro García
31. Franco Beccera
33. Daniel Beroggi

=== China ===
Head coach: Weng Haiqin

1. Chen Qijun
2. Chen Chengfu
3. Gao Jiesheng
7. Pan Dongquan
8. E Wenhui
9. Chen Chongcong
11. Lin Musen
13. Du Shihao
15. Zhang Xiaojia
16. Ao Suozhu
19. Chao Jieming
20. Lin Changliang (C)
21. Meng Lei
22. Du Talake
28. Zhang Bo
29. Zhu Weijiang
30. Wang Weihao (GK)
32. Wang Caiyu (GK)

=== Germany ===
Head coach: André Henning

Germany announced their final squad on 22 December 2023.

1. Alexander Stadler (GK)
2. Mathias Müller
3. Mats Grambusch (C)
4. Lukas Windfeder
6. Raphael Hartkopf
7. Thies Prinz
9. Niklas Wellen
10. Johannes Große
14. Teo Hinrichs
15. Tom Grambusch
16. Gonzalo Peillat
17. Christopher Rühr
19. Justus Weigand
22. Marco Miltkau
23. Martin Zwicker
25. Hannes Müller
44. Moritz Ludwig
74. Jean-Paul Danneberg (GK)

=== Great Britain ===
Head coach: Paul Revington

2. Nicolas Park
3. Jack Waller
5. David Ames (C)
6. Jacob Draper
7. Zachary Wallace
8. Rupert Shipperley
13. Samuel Ward
14. James Albery
15. Phillip Roper
16. James Mazarelo (GK)
18. Brendan Creed
20. Oliver Payne (GK)
23. Nicholas Bandurak
26. James Gall
27. Liam Sanford
28. Lee Morton
29. Thomas Sorsby
31. William Calnan

=== Malaysia ===
Head coach: Arul Anthoni

4. Ramadan Rosli
6. Marhan Jalil (C)
7. Fitri Saari
8. Ashran Hamsani
13. Firhan Ashari
15. Shello Silverius
16. Zaimi Mat Deris (GK)
17. Razie Rahim
18. Faiz Jali
20. Azuan Hasan
21. Hafizuddin Othman (GK)
22. Norsyafiq Sumantri
23. Abu Kamal Azrai
24. Aiman Rozemi
26. Shahril Saabah
27. Shafiq Hassan
28. Zul Pidaus Mizun
29. Amirul Azahar

=== New Zealand ===
Head coach: (South Africa) Greg Nicol

New Zealand announced their final squad on 21 December 2023.

1. Dominic Dixon (GK)
2. Scott Boyde
4. Dane Lett
8. Charlie Morrison
9. Samuel Hiha
11. Jacob Smith
12. Samuel Lane
13. Simon Yorston
16. Aidan Sarikaya
17. Nicholas Woods (C)
19. Joseph Morrison
20. Leon Hayward (GK)
21. Kane Russell
22. Blair Tarrant
24. Sean Findlay
29. Hugo Inglis
31. Hayden Phillips
37. Isaac Houlbrooke

=== Pakistan ===
Head coach: Abdul Haneef Khan

1. Abdullah Ishtiaq Khan (GK)
2. Muhammad Abdullah
3. Arbaz Ahmad
4. Ahmad Butt (C)
5. Sufyan Khan
6. Abdul Manan
7. Abu Mahmood
8. Waheed Ashraf Rana
9. Hannan Shahid
10. Aqeel Ahmad
11. Zikriya Hayat
12. Waqar (GK)
13. Arshad Liaqat
14. Moin Shakeel
15. Ghazanfar Ali
16. Muhammad Razzaq
17. Murtaza Yaqoob
18. Rehman Abdul

== Tournament 2 ==
=== Austria ===
Head coach: Robin Rösch

4. Fülöp Losonci
5. Peter Kaltenböck
10. Daniel Frölich
11. Nikolas Wellan
12. Josef Winkler
13. Benjamin Stanzl
14. Christoph Soldat
16. Maximilian Scholz
17. Moritz Frey
19. Maximilian Kelner
20. Franz Lindengrun
21. Benjamin Kölbl
23. Fabian Unterkircher
24. Leon Thornblöm (C)
29. Oliver Kern
30. Mateusz Nyckowiak
32. Mateusz Szymczyk (GK)
33. Jakob Kastner (GK)

=== Belgium ===
Head coach: (Netherlands) Michel van den Heuvel

Belgium announced their final squad on 30 December 2023.

2. Loïc van Doren (GK)
3. Thibeau Stockbroekx
4. Arthur van Doren
7. John-John Dohmen
8. Florent van Aubel
12. Gauthier Boccard
16. Alexander Hendrickx
19. Félix Denayer (C)
20. William Ghislain
21. Vincent Vanasch (GK)
23. Arthur de Sloover
25. Loïck Luypaert
26. Victor Wegnez
27. Tom Boon
29. Maxime van Oost
30. Nelson Onana
31. Arno van Dessel
32. Tanguy Cosyns

=== Egypt ===
Head coach: Zaman Tahir

2. Mohamed Edris
3. Mohamed Mansour
5. Zeiad Esmat
7. Ahmed Mohsen
8. Mostafa Ragab
9. Amr Sayed (C)
10. Ashraf Said
11. Ahmad El-Naggar
12. Mohamed Ragab
13. Mahmoud Mamdouh
14. Karim Atef
15. Moustafa Tark
16. Mahmoud Hussin (GK)
17. Mohamed Nasr
21. Ahmed El-Ganaini
25. Hassam Ghobram
30. Hossameldin Ragab
32. Mohamed Hemid (GK)

=== Ireland ===
Head coach: Mark Tumilty

Ireland announced their final squad on 18 December 2023.

1. David Harte (GK)
2. Jamie Carr (GK)
6. Luke Madeley
7. Timothy Cross
8. John McKee
9. Matthew Nelson
10. Daragh Walsh
15. Kyle Marshall
16. Shane O'Donoghue
17. Sean Murray (C)
19. Peter McKibbin
20. Jeremy Duncan
22. Michael Robson
25. Jonathan Lynch
29. Lee Cole
36. Sam Hyland
40. Benjamin Johnson
45. Nicholas Page

=== Japan ===
Head coach: Akira Takahashi

Japan announced their final squad on 26 December 2023.

1. Koji Yamasaki
2. Shota Yamada
4. Yamato Kawahara
5. Seren Tanaka
7. Kentaro Fukuda
8. Taiki Takade
10. Takuma Niwa
12. Yuma Nagai
13. Manabu Yamashita
14. Raiki Fujishima
15. Ken Nagayoshi
16. Hiro Saito
19. Ryoma Ooka
20. Masaki Ohashi (C)
21. Genki Mitani
22. Kaito Tanaka
29. Katumi Kitagawa (GK)
30. Takashi Yoshikawa (GK)

=== South Korea ===
Head coach: Shin Seok-kyo

1. Kim Jae-hyeon (GK)
3. Kim Hyeon-hong
6. Lee Nam-yong (C)
7. Jung Man-jae
9. Kim Jung-hoo
10. Hwang Tae-il
11. Lee Jung-jun
12. Seo In-woo
13. Ji Woo-cheon
14. Park Cheo-leon
15. Lee Hye-seung
16. Kim Jae-han (GK)
18. Kim Sung-hyun
19. Jeong Jun-woo
21. Lee Seung-hoon
23. Kim Hyeong-jin
25. Jang Jong-hyun
33. Yang Ji-hun

=== Spain ===
Head coach: (Argentina) Maximiliano Caldas

Spain announced their final squad on 30 December 2023.

2. Alejandro Alonso
6. Xavier Gispert
7. Enrique González
8. Marc Recasens
9. Álvaro Iglesias
10. José Basterra
12. Marc Reyné
14. Marc Miralles (C)
15. Jordi Bonastre
16. Rafael Revilla (GK)
17. Pepe Cunill
18. Joaquín Menini
24. Ignacio Rodríguez
29. Gerard Clapés
42. Luis Calzado (GK)
90. Borja Lacalle
91. Álvaro Portugal
99. Rafael Vilallonga

=== Ukraine ===
Head coach: Pavlo Mazur

1. Roman Bludov (GK)
2. Dmytro Hrubyi
3. Viacheslav Paziuk
5. Mykhailo Yasinskyi
7. Dmytro Luppa (C)
8. Volodymyr Kaplinskyi
10. Iurii Moroz
11. Oleksii Popov
12. Vitalii Shevchuk
13. Maksym Onofriiuk
14. Bohdan Kovalenko
15. Volodymyr Zhmereniuk
16. Andrii Koshelenko
18. Oleksandr Solomianyi
19. Oleksandr Boiko
23. Volodymyr Kostechko
28. Oleksandr Yasinskyi
30. Bohdan Tovstolytkin (GK)
