= 2016–17 Men's FIH Hockey World League Round 2 =

Field hockey tournament

The 2016–17 Men's FIH Hockey World League Round 2 was held in March and April 2017. A total of 24 teams competing in three events took part in this round of the tournament playing for 8 berths in the Semifinals, played in June and July 2017.

== Qualification ==
9 teams ranked between 12th and 20th in the FIH World Rankings current at the time of seeking entries for the competition qualified automatically. However, South Africa was chosen to host a Semifinal, hence exempt from Round 2 and leaving 8 teams qualified. Additionally 14 teams qualified from Round 1 as well as two nations that did not meet ranking criteria and were exempt from Round 1 to host a Round 2 tournament. The following 24 teams, shown with final pre-tournament rankings, competed in this round of the tournament.

Dates	Event	Location	Quotas	Qualifier(s)
	Ranked 12th to 20th in the FIH World Rankings		8	Malaysia (13); Ireland (10); Canada (11); Japan (16); Poland (19); France (17); Russia (22); Egypt (20)
	Host nation		2	Bangladesh (32); Trinidad and Tobago (33)
9–17 April 2016	2016–17 FIH Hockey World League Round 1	Singapore	2	China (18); Sri Lanka (41)
28 June–2 July 2016	2016–17 FIH Hockey World League Round 1	Suva, Fiji	1	Fiji (44)
30 August–4 September 2016	2016–17 FIH Hockey World League Round 1	Prague, Czech Republic	2	Ukraine (24); Italy (35)
6–11 September 2016	2016–17 FIH Hockey World League Round 1	Glasgow, Scotland	3	Wales (34); Scotland (27); Switzerland (30)
9–11 September 2016	2016–17 FIH Hockey World League Round 1	Antalya, Turkey	2	Austria (21); Oman (31)
9–11 September 2016	2016–17 FIH Hockey World League Round 1	Accra, Ghana	1	Ghana (38)
27 September–2 October 2016	2016–17 FIH Hockey World League Round 1	Salamanca, Mexico	2	United States (29); Barbados (49)
1–9 October 2016	2016–17 FIH Hockey World League Round 1	Chiclayo, Peru	1	Chile (26)
Total			24	

== Dhaka ==
- Dhaka, Bangladesh, 4–12 March 2017.

All times are local (UTC+6).

=== First round ===
==== Pool A ====
Pos	Team	Pld	W	PW	PL	L	GF	GA	GD	Pts	Qualification
1	Malaysia	3	3	0	0	0	20	2	+18	9	Quarterfinals
2	Oman	3	2	0	0	1	11	8	+3	6	Quarterfinals
3	Bangladesh (H)	3	1	0	0	2	7	7	0	3	Quarterfinals
4	Fiji	3	0	0	0	3	2	23	−21	0	Quarterfinals

Source: FIH
Rules for classification: 1) points; 2) goal difference; 3) goals scored; 4) head-to-head result.
(H) Host

4 March 2017
13:45

Oman	7–0	Fiji
Al-Shatari 24'; Bait Jandal 27', 38', 46'; Rajab 35'; Al-Shibli 45'; Al-Nasseri 58'	Report

Umpires:
Tao Zhinan (CHN)
Dayan Dissanayake (SRI)

4 March 2017
16:00

Malaysia	3–0	Bangladesh
Jalil 5'; Hassan 19'; Nik Rosemi 54'	Report

Umpires:
Zeke Newman (AUS)
Sherif El-Amari (EGY)

5 March 2017
13:45

Oman	1–6	Malaysia
Al-Lawati 37'	Report	Saabah 11'; Rahim 26'; Ahmad 33', 48'; Nik 42', 53'

Umpires:
Zeke Newman (AUS)
Tao Zhinan (CHN)

5 March 2017
16:00

Bangladesh	5–1	Fiji
Chayan 26', 51'; Mahmud 37', 41'; Islam 58'	Report	Dutta 32'

Umpires:
Sherif El-Amari (EGY)
Alfred Akrong (GHA)

7 March 2017
09:15

Malaysia	11–1	Fiji
Saabah 2', 12', 23', 59'; Baharom 3', 22'; Ahmad 10'; Saari 11', 55', 58'; Rahim 17'	Report	Edwards 29'

Umpires:
Alfred Akrong (GHA)
Sherif El-Amari (EGY)

7 March 2017
16:00

Bangladesh	2–3	Oman
Chayan 9'; Sarkar 17'	Report	Bait Jandal 15'; Al-Hasani 25'; Al-Batashi 26'

Umpires:
Zeke Newman (AUS)
Tao Zhinan (CHN)

==== Pool B ====
Pos	Team	Pld	W	PW	PL	L	GF	GA	GD	Pts	Qualification
1	China	3	2	0	1	0	14	6	+8	7	Quarterfinals
2	Egypt	3	1	2	0	0	9	5	+4	7	Quarterfinals
3	Ghana	3	1	0	1	1	9	12	−3	4	Quarterfinals
4	Sri Lanka	3	0	0	0	3	7	16	−9	0	Quarterfinals

Source: FIH
Rules for classification: 1) points; 2) goal difference; 3) goals scored; 4) head-to-head result.

4 March 2017
09:15

China	7–3	Ghana
E Wenl. 3', 53'; Du T. 12'; E L. 15'; Su L. 21'; Guo J. 42'; Ao S. 58'	Report	Baiden 23', 56'; Botsio 33'

Umpires:
Puvalagan Paskaran (MAS)
Khalil Al-Balushi (OMA)

4 March 2017
11:30

Egypt	6–2	Sri Lanka
Sayed 15', 59'; Ghabran 23', 56'; El-Naggar 52'; Adel 58'	Report	Mulafar 41'; Nuwarapaksha 58'

Umpires:
Ilanggo Kanabathu (MAS)
Shahbaz Ali (BAN)

5 March 2017
09:15

Ghana	5–4	Sri Lanka
Botsio 8', 24', 57'; Akaba 25'; Baiden 26'	Report	Rathnayaka 9'; Doranegala 43'; Fernando 43'; Hendeniya 46'

Umpires:
Shahbaz Ali (BAN)
Harry Heritage (FIJ)

5 March 2017
11:30

Egypt	2–2	China
El-Naggar 28'; Mamdouh 53'	Report	Guo J. 3'; Du T. 9'
Penalties
Mamdouh (penalty shoot-out missed); Sayed (penalty shoot-out scored); Adel (penalty shoot-out missed); El-Hady (penalty shoot-out scored); Mansour (penalty shoot-out missed); Sayed (penalty shoot-out scored)	3–2	(penalty shoot-out scored) E L. (penalty shoot-out missed) Ao S. (penalty shoot-out missed) Guo Z. (penalty shoot-out missed) Guo X. (penalty shoot-out scored) Du C. (penalty shoot-out missed) E L.

Umpires:
Ilanggo Kanabathu (MAS)
Khalil Al-Balushi (OMA)

7 March 2017
11:30

China	5–1	Sri Lanka
Guo Z. 6', 44'; Guo X. 10'; Du T. 41'; Du C. 55'	Report	Kulathunga 11'

Umpires:
Harry Heritage (FIJ)
Puvalagan Paskaran (MAS)

7 March 2017
13:45

Ghana	1–1	Egypt
Botsio 34'	Report	Mamdouh 23'
Penalties
Damalie (penalty shoot-out missed); Baiden (penalty shoot-out scored); Abbiw (penalty shoot-out missed); Opoku (penalty shoot-out scored)	2–4	(penalty shoot-out scored) Sayed; (penalty shoot-out scored) El-Hady; (penalty shoot-out missed) Mamdouh; (penalty shoot-out scored) Atef; (penalty shoot-out scored) Mansour

Umpires:
Ilanggo Kanabathu (MAS)
Shahbaz Ali (BAN)

=== Second round ===
==== Bracket ====
Quarterfinals
9 March
Malaysia	5
Sri Lanka	2
9 March
Egypt	5
Bangladesh	1
9 March
Oman	4
Ghana	3
9 March
China	17
Fiji	0

Semifinals
11 March
Malaysia	5
Egypt	0
11 March
Oman	1
China	5

Final
12 March
Malaysia (p.s.o.)	2 (5)
China	2 (3)
Third place
12 March
Egypt	5
Oman	1

5–8th place bracket

5–8th place semifinals
11 March
Sri Lanka	0
Bangladesh	9
11 March
Ghana	11
Fiji	2

Fifth place
12 March
Bangladesh (p.s.o.)	3 (4)
Ghana	3 (3)
Seventh place
12 March
Sri Lanka	5
Fiji	3

==== Quarterfinals ====
9 March 2017
09:15

Malaysia	5–2	Sri Lanka
Rosli 9', 22'; Ahmad 18'; Nik 23'; Baharom 29'	Report	Karunamunige 14'; Doranegala 27'

Umpires:
Alfred Akrong (GHA)
Shahbaz Ali (BAN)

9 March 2017
11:30

China	17–0	Fiji
Du T. 1', 33', 35'; Ao Y. 2'; Guo X. 10', 20', 42'; Du C. 11'; Guo J. 17'; E W. 21', 60'; E L. 23', 51'; Lu 28'; Ao S. 30'; E. Wenh 49'; Wo 54'	Report

Umpires:
Dayan Dissanayake (SRI)
Khalil Al-Balushi (OMA)

9 March 2017
13:45

Oman	4–3	Ghana
Al-Lawati 6'; Rajab 17'; Al-Shaaibi 34'; Bait Jandal 37'	Report	Botsio 18', 49'; Balagi 59'

Umpires:
Ilanggo Kanabathu (MAS)
Sherif El-Amari (EGY)

9 March 2017
16:05

Egypt	5–1	Bangladesh
Mamdouh 4'; Sayed 17', 49'; Gamal 30'; Hassan 55'	Report	Islam 17'

Umpires:
Zeke Newman (AUS)
Tao Zhinan (CHN)

==== Fifth to eighth place classification ====
===== Crossover =====
11 March 2017
09:15

Sri Lanka	0–9	Bangladesh
	Report	Chayan 1', 24'; M. Hossain 11', 32', 59'; Islam 46'; A. Hossain 49', 58'; Mahmud 56'

Umpires:
Tao Zhinan (CHN)
Harry Heritage (FIJ)

11 March 2017
11:30

Ghana	11–2	Fiji
Botsio 6', 20', 21', 22', 56'; Damalie 11'; Baah 17'; Akaba 25'; Balagi 29'; Adjei 32'; Nsalbini 46'	Report	Dutta 18'; A. Smith 43'

Umpires:
Dayan Dissanayake (SRI)
Puvalagan Paskaran (MAS)

===== Seventh and eighth place =====
12 March 2017
09:15

Sri Lanka	5–3	Fiji
Nuwarapaksha 10'; Gunawardhana 18', 29'; Kulathunga 41'; Sudusingha 48'	Report	H. Smith 6'; Saqacala 21'; Bentley 49'

Umpires:
Shahbaz Ali (BAN)
Alfred Akrong (GHA)

===== Fifth and sixth place =====
12 March 2017
11:45

Bangladesh	3–3	Ghana
Chayan 19', 21'; Mahmud 60+'	Report	Botsio 17'; Akaba 43'; Damalie 53'
Penalties
Chayan (penalty shoot-out missed); Das (penalty shoot-out scored); Islam (penalty shoot-out scored); Sarkar (penalty shoot-out missed); Mahmud (penalty shoot-out scored); Das (penalty shoot-out scored)	4–3	(penalty shoot-out missed) Botsio; (penalty shoot-out scored) Akaba; (penalty shoot-out scored) Opoku; (penalty shoot-out scored) Adjei; (penalty shoot-out missed) Nsalbini; (penalty shoot-out missed) Opoku

Umpires:
Khalil Al-Balushi (OMA)
Puvalagan Paskaran (MAS)

==== First to fourth place classification ====
===== Semifinals =====
11 March 2017
13:45

Malaysia	5–0	Egypt
Rahim 15+'; Saari 25'; Ahmad 30'; Saabah 44'; Nik 49'	Report

Umpires:
Zeke Newman (AUS)
Shahbaz Ali (BAN)

11 March 2017
16:00

Oman	1–5	China
Al-Nasseri 53'	Report	Du T. 5', 13', 40'; Su L. 36'; Guo J. 56'

Umpires:
Ilanggo Kanabathu (MAS)
Sherif El-Amari (EGY)

===== Third and fourth place =====
12 March 2017
13:45

Egypt	5–1	Oman
Ghabran 11'; Mamdouh 13', 60'; Ibrahim 54', 59'	Report	Bait Jandal 21'

Umpires:
Tao Zhinan (CHN)
Ilanggo Kanabathu (MAS)

===== Final =====
12 March 2017
16:00

Malaysia	2–2	China
Saabah 46'; Jazlan 55'	Report	Du T. 15+'; Su J. 22'
Penalties
Nik (penalty shoot-out scored); Jali (penalty shoot-out scored); Jalil (penalty shoot-out scored); Ahmad (penalty shoot-out scored); Saari (penalty shoot-out scored)	5–3	(penalty shoot-out scored) E L. (penalty shoot-out scored) Ao S. (penalty shoot-out scored) Guo Z. (penalty shoot-out missed) Meng

Umpires:
Sherif El-Amari (EGY)
Zeke Newman (AUS)

=== Final ranking ===
Qualified for Semifinals

Rank	Team
1	Malaysia
2	China
3	Egypt
4	Oman
5	Bangladesh
6	Ghana
7	Sri Lanka
8	Fiji

== Belfast ==
- Belfast, Northern Ireland, 11–19 March 2017.

All times are local (UTC±0).

=== First round ===
==== Pool A ====
Pos	Team	Pld	W	PW	PL	L	GF	GA	GD	Pts	Qualification
1	Ireland (H)	3	2	1	0	0	11	3	+8	8	Quarterfinals
2	Austria	3	1	1	1	0	6	4	+2	6	Quarterfinals
3	Italy	3	1	0	1	1	7	4	+3	4	Quarterfinals
4	Ukraine	3	0	0	0	3	6	19	−13	0	Quarterfinals

Source: FIH
Rules for classification: 1) points; 2) goal difference; 3) goals scored; 4) head-to-head result.
(H) Host

11 March 2017
15:00

Ireland	9–2	Ukraine
Duncan 8'; McKee 15', 26'; O'Donoghue 20'; Cole 26'; Nelson 42'; Harte 54'; M. Bell 58'; Walker 59'	Report	Koshelenko 9'; Diachuk 60'

Umpires:
Xavier Fenaert (FRA)
Ian Diamond (SCO)

11 March 2017
17:15

Austria	1–1	Italy
Körper 22'	Report	Keenan 18'
Penalties
Stanzl (penalty shoot-out scored); Schmidt (penalty shoot-out scored); Thörnblom (penalty shoot-out missed); Eitenberger (penalty shoot-out scored); Schmidt (penalty shoot-out missed); Stanzl (penalty shoot-out scored)	4–3	(penalty shoot-out missed) Dallons; (penalty shoot-out scored) Nunez; (penalty shoot-out scored) Ursone; (penalty shoot-out scored) Keenan; (penalty shoot-out missed) Carta; (penalty shoot-out missed) Dallons

Umpires:
Bruce Bale (ENG)
Jamie Hooper (WAL)

12 March 2017
14:30

Austria	1–1	Ireland
Uher 59'	Report	Nelson 3'
Penalties
Stanzl (penalty shoot-out scored); Schmidt (penalty shoot-out missed); Fröhlich (penalty shoot-out scored); Eitenberger (penalty shoot-out missed)	2–4	(penalty shoot-out scored) Harte; (penalty shoot-out scored) Magee; (penalty shoot-out scored) McKee; (penalty shoot-out scored) O'Donoghue

Umpires:
Sebastien Duterme (BEL)
Jamie Hooper (WAL)

12 March 2017
16:45

Ukraine	2–6	Italy
Koshelenko 2'; Kalinchuk 46'	Report	Keenan 13'; Da Gai 28'; Jua. Montone 28'; Amorosini 32'; Dallons 41', 58'

Umpires:
Ian Diamond (SCO)
Łukasz Zwierzchowski (POL)

14 March 2017
14:30

Ireland	1–0	Italy
Nelson 25'	Report

Umpires:
Sebastien Duterme (BEL)
Jamie Hooper (WAL)

14 March 2017
16:45

Ukraine	2–4	Austria
Kalinchuk 13'; Kovalenko 22'	Report	Bele 10'; Körper 23', 28'; Thörnblom 24'

Umpires:
Xavier Fenaert (FRA)
Łukasz Zwierzchowski (POL)

==== Pool B ====
Pos	Team	Pld	W	PW	PL	L	GF	GA	GD	Pts	Qualification
1	France	3	3	0	0	0	7	2	+5	9	Quarterfinals
2	Wales	3	1	1	0	1	5	4	+1	5	Quarterfinals
3	Scotland	3	1	0	1	1	5	6	−1	4	Quarterfinals
4	Poland	3	0	0	0	3	3	8	−5	0	Quarterfinals

Source: FIH
Rules for classification: 1) points; 2) goal difference; 3) goals scored; 4) head-to-head result.

11 March 2017
10:30

France	3–1	Scotland
Martin-Brisac 26'; Charlet 41'; Kieffer 45'	Report	Forsyth 50'

Umpires:
Sebastien Duterme (BEL)
Oliver Tarnoczi (AUT)

11 March 2017
12:45

Poland	1–3	Wales
Gruszczyński 52'	Report	Furlong 25'; Hawker 33'; Shipperley 53'

Umpires:
Vincenzo Ilgrande (ITA)
Malcolm Coombes (IRL)

12 March 2017
10:30

Poland	1–3	France
Bratkowski 46'	Report	Charlet 5'; Rogeau 24'; T. Genestet 45'

Umpires:
Bruce Bale (ENG)
Oliver Tarnoczi (AUT)

12 March 2017
12:45

Scotland	2–2	Wales
Greaves 4'; Forsyth 8'	Report	Carless 6'; Furlong 52'
Penalties
Marshall (penalty shoot-out missed); Forsyth (penalty shoot-out missed); Morton (penalty shoot-out scored); Byers (penalty shoot-out scored)	2–4	(penalty shoot-out scored) Prosser; (penalty shoot-out missed) Carson; (penalty shoot-out scored) Brignull; (penalty shoot-out scored) Dolan-Gray; (penalty shoot-out scored) Francis

Umpires:
Maksym Perepelytsya (UKR)
Malcolm Coombes (IRL)

14 March 2017
10:00

Scotland	2–1	Poland
Forsyth 2', 56'	Report	Kotulski 33'

Umpires:
Maksym Perepelytsya (UKR)
Vincenzo Ilgrande (ITA)

14 March 2017
12:45

France	1–0	Wales
Rogeau 9'	Report

Umpires:
Bruce Bale (ENG)
Ian Diamond (SCO)

=== Second round ===
==== Bracket ====
Quarterfinals
16 March
Ireland	5
Poland	1
16 March
Wales	3
Italy	0
16 March
Austria	5 (2)
Scotland (p.s.o.)	5 (4)
16 March
France	11
Ukraine	2

Semifinals
18 March
Ireland	3
Wales	1
18 March
Scotland	0
France	2

Final
19 March
Ireland (p.s.o.)	1 (4)
France	1 (2)
Third place
19 March
Wales	0
Scotland	4

5–8th place bracket

5–8th place semifinals
18 March
Poland	2
Italy	1
18 March
Austria	6
Ukraine	1

Fifth place
19 March
Poland	1
Austria	2
Seventh place
19 March
Italy	4
Ukraine	2

==== Quarterfinals ====
16 March 2017
10:00

France	11–2	Ukraine
Tynevez 9', 60'; T. Genestet 12'; Masson 15', 45'; Rogeau 19', 57'; Deront 22'; Van Straaten 41'; Kieffer 54'; Lockwood 55'	Report	Koshelenko 50'; Mazurkevych 56'

Umpires:
Bruce Bale (ENG)
Oliver Tarnoczi (AUT)

16 March 2017
12:15

Wales	3–0	Italy
Furlong 15+', 21'; Shipperley 43'	Report

Umpires:
Sebastien Duterme (BEL)
Maksym Perepelytsya (UKR)

16 March 2017
14:30

Austria	5–5	Scotland
Bele 2'; Uher 18', 32', 60'; Stanzl 40'	Report	Forsyth 9', 22', 43'; Greaves 34'; Morton 59'
Penalties
Stanzl (penalty shoot-out scored); Eitenberger (penalty shoot-out missed); Fröhlich (penalty shoot-out scored); Thörnblom (penalty shoot-out missed)	2–4	(penalty shoot-out scored) Forsyth; (penalty shoot-out scored) Wong; (penalty shoot-out scored) Morton; (penalty shoot-out scored) Byers

Umpires:
Xavier Fenaert (FRA)
Malcolm Coombes (IRL)

16 March 2017
16:45

Ireland	5–1	Poland
McKee 20', 58'; Magee 21'; O'Donoghue 26', 34'	Report	Bulka 51'

Umpires:
Ian Diamond (SCO)
Vincenzo Ilgrande (ITA)

==== Fifth to eighth place classification ====
===== Crossover =====
18 March 2017
10:00

Austria	6–1	Ukraine
Körper 21', 25', 54'; Schmidt 29'; Uher 37'; Bele 43'	Report	Koshelenko 18'

Umpires:
Xavier Fenaert (FRA)
Łukasz Zwierzchowski (POL)

18 March 2017
12:45

Poland	2–1	Italy
Pawlak 8'; Hulbój 39'	Report	Jua. Montone 9'

Umpires:
Maksym Perepelytsya (UKR)
Jamie Hooper (WAL)

===== Seventh and eighth place =====
19 March 2017
10:00

Ukraine	2–4	Italy
Koshelenko 6'; Onofriiuk 14'	Report	Keenan 6', 9'; Ursone 15'; Dallons 22'

Umpires:
Oliver Tarnoczi (AUT)
Łukasz Zwierzchowski (POL)

===== Fifth and sixth place =====
19 March 2017
12:15

Austria	2–1	Poland
Körper 3', 18'	Report	Hulbój 18'

Umpires:
Maksym Perepelytsya (UKR)
Malcolm Coombes (IRL)

==== First to fourth place classification ====
===== Semifinals =====
18 March 2017
14:30

Ireland	3–1	Wales
O'Donoghue 18'; Walker 25'; Glassey 48'	Report	Furlong 11'

Umpires:
Bruce Bale (ENG)
Ian Diamond (SCO)

18 March 2017
16:45

Scotland	0–2	France
	Report	Van Straaten 15'; Charlet 22'

Umpires:
Sebastien Duterme (BEL)
Vincenzo Ilgrande (ITA)

===== Third and fourth place =====
19 March 2017
14:30

Wales	0–4	Scotland
	Report	Adams 23', 54'; Byers 42'; Cosgrove 55'

Umpires:
Sebastien Duterme (BEL)
Xavier Fenaert (FRA)

===== Final =====
19 March 2017
16:45

Ireland	1–1	France
O'Donoghue 52'	Report	Charlet 30'
Penalties
Harte (penalty shoot-out scored); Magee (penalty shoot-out scored); Cole (penalty shoot-out scored); O'Donoghue (penalty shoot-out missed); McKee (penalty shoot-out scored)	4–2	(penalty shoot-out scored) Lockwood; (penalty shoot-out missed) T. Genestet; (penalty shoot-out scored) Forgues; (penalty shoot-out missed) Deront

Umpires:
Bruce Bale (ENG)
Vincenzo Ilgrande (ITA)

=== Final ranking ===
Qualified for Semifinals

Rank	Team
1	Ireland
2	France
3	Scotland
4	Wales
5	Austria
6	Poland
7	Italy
8	Ukraine

== Tacarigua ==
- Tacarigua, Trinidad and Tobago, 25 March–2 April 2017.

All times are local (UTC−4).

=== First round ===
==== Pool A ====
Pos	Team	Pld	W	PW	PL	L	GF	GA	GD	Pts	Qualification
1	Canada	3	3	0	0	0	19	3	+16	9	Quarterfinals
2	United States	3	1	1	0	1	11	7	+4	5	Quarterfinals
3	Chile	3	1	0	1	1	5	8	−3	4	Quarterfinals
4	Barbados	3	0	0	0	3	2	19	−17	0	Quarterfinals

Source: FIH
Rules for classification: 1) points; 2) goal difference; 3) goals scored; 4) head-to-head result.

25 March 2017
13:15

Canada	4–2	United States
Pereira 10'; Ho-Garcia 19'; Tupper 44'; Johnston 55'	Report	Holt 46'; Van Dam 55'

Umpires:
Federico García (URU)
Chahir Panschiri (SUI)

25 March 2017
15:30

Chile	2–1	Barbados
Ordóñez 10'; Achondo 46'	Report	Rudder 42'

Umpires:
Michihiko Watanabe (JPN)
Dimitry Zhabin (RUS)

26 March 2017
13:15

United States	7–1	Barbados
Harris 10', 50'; Sundeen 11'; Holt 20'; Käppeler 28'; Molcsan 39'; Khokhar 57'	Report	Warner 53'

Umpires:
Michihiko Watanabe (JPN)
Dimitry Zhabin (RUS)

26 March 2017
15:30

Chile	1–5	Canada
Fer. Renz 32'	Report	Pearson 40', 44'; Johnston 41'; Pereira 47'; Tupper 50'

Umpires:
Donny Gobinsingh (TTO)
Chahir Panschiri (SUI)

28 March 2017
15:30

United States	2–2	Chile
Singh 45'; Holt 46'	Report	Martín 21'; Amoroso 32'
Penalties
Harris (penalty shoot-out missed); Singh (penalty shoot-out scored); Dhadwal (penalty shoot-out scored)	2–0	(penalty shoot-out missed) Achondo; (penalty shoot-out missed) Rodríguez; (penalty shoot-out missed) Martín; (penalty shoot-out missed) Purcell

Umpires:
Federico García (URU)
Donny Gobinsingh (TTO)

28 March 2017
17:45

Canada	10–0	Barbados
Ho-Garcia 3', 3', 20'; Johnston 13', 38', 39'; Curran 15'; Sarmento 29'; Pearson 45', 50'	Report

Umpires:
Chahir Panschiri (SUI)
Michihiko Watanabe (JPN)

==== Pool B ====
Pos	Team	Pld	W	PW	PL	L	GF	GA	GD	Pts	Qualification
1	Japan	3	3	0	0	0	11	2	+9	9	Quarterfinals
2	Russia	3	2	0	0	1	8	5	+3	6	Quarterfinals
3	Trinidad and Tobago (H)	3	1	0	0	2	8	10	−2	3	Quarterfinals
4	Switzerland	3	0	0	0	3	3	13	−10	0	Quarterfinals

Source: FIH
Rules for classification: 1) points; 2) goal difference; 3) goals scored; 4) head-to-head result.
(H) Host

25 March 2017
17:45

Japan	3–0	Switzerland
Ke. Tanaka 3', 15', 34'	Report

Umpires:
Guillermo Poblete (CHI)
Shane Lewis (BAR)

25 March 2017
20:00

Russia	3–1	Trinidad and Tobago
Kornilov 28'; Shchipachev 37'; Khairullin 58'	Report	James 3'

Umpires:
Andrés Ledesma (ARG)
Tyler Klenk (CAN)

26 March 2017
17:45

Russia	1–3	Japan
Skiperskiy 54'	Report	Ke. Tanaka 14', 15'; Fukuda 22'

Umpires:
Andrés Ledesma (ARG)
Lance Sarabia (USA)

26 March 2017
20:00

Switzerland	2–6	Trinidad and Tobago
Hödle 5'; Müller 50'	Report	Mouttet 8'; James 26'; Browne 27', 28'; Marcano 37'; Daniel 59'

Umpires:
Federico García (URU)
Shane Lewis (BAR)

28 March 2017
13:15

Switzerland	1–4	Russia
Hödle 44'	Report	Yankun 28', 45'; Shchipachev 31'; Matkovskiy 35'

Umpires:
Lance Sarabia (USA)
Guillermo Poblete (CHI)

28 March 2017
20:00

Japan	5–1	Trinidad and Tobago
Fukuda 6', 21'; Ke. Tanaka 30'; Yamada 52'; Ka. Tanaka 58'	Report	Marcano 49'

Umpires:
Tyler Klenk (CAN)
Andrés Ledesma (ARG)

=== Second round ===
==== Bracket ====
Quarterfinals
30 March
Canada	2
Switzerland	1
30 March
Russia	4
Chile	2
30 March
United States (p.s.o.)	2 (3)
Trinidad and Tobago	2 (2)
30 March
Japan	5
Barbados	0

Semifinals
1 April
Canada	4
Russia	1
1 April
United States	0
Japan	2

Final
2 April
Canada	1
Japan	2
Third place
2 April
Russia	2 (1)
United States (p.s.o.)	2 (2)

5–8th place bracket

5–8th place semifinals
1 April
Switzerland	4
Chile	2
1 April
Trinidad and Tobago	3
Barbados	1

Fifth place
2 April
Switzerland	2
Trinidad and Tobago	3
Seventh place
2 April
Chile (p.s.o.)	0 (3)
Barbados	0 (1)

==== Quarterfinals ====
30 March 2017
13:15

Canada	2–1	Switzerland
Tupper 38', 54'	Report	Steffen 41'

Umpires:
Donny Gobinsingh (TTO)
Dimitry Zhabin (RUS)

30 March 2017
15:30

Russia	4–2	Chile
Karaev 8'; Khairullin 19'; Korolev 26'; Zamalutdinov 32'	Report	Ovalle 56'; Purcell 60'

Umpires:
Michihiko Watanabe (JPN)
Shane Lewis (BAR)

30 March 2017
17:45

Japan	5–0	Barbados
Ke. Tanaka 1'; S. Tanaka 10'; Yamada 24'; Zendana 37'; Fukuda 53'	Report

Umpires:
Lance Sarabia (USA)
Guillermo Poblete (CHI)

30 March 2017
20:00

United States	2–2	Trinidad and Tobago
Barminski 44'; Harris 59'	Report	Pierre 23'; Francis 43'
Penalties
Harris (penalty shoot-out scored); Singh (penalty shoot-out missed); Dhadwal (penalty shoot-out scored); Holt (penalty shoot-out missed); Sundeen (penalty shoot-out scored)	3–2	(penalty shoot-out missed) Te. Marcano; (penalty shoot-out missed) Ta. Marcano; (penalty shoot-out missed) Pierre; (penalty shoot-out scored) Daniel; (penalty shoot-out scored) Brown

Umpires:
Federico García (URU)
Andrés Ledesma (ARG)

==== Fifth to eighth place classification ====
===== Crossover =====
1 April 2017
13:15

Switzerland	4–2	Chile
Appel 5'; Greder 30'; Morard 34'; Schneider 52'	Report	Lagos 10'; Purcell 18'

Umpires:
Lance Sarabia (USA)
Donny Gobinsingh (TTO)

1 April 2017
15:30

Trinidad and Tobago	3–1	Barbados
Te. Marcano 20', 42', 60'	Report	Rudder 59'

Umpires:
Dimitry Zhabin (RUS)
Chahir Panschiri (SUI)

===== Seventh and eighth place =====
2 April 2017
13:15

Chile	0–0	Barbados
	Report
Penalties
Martín (penalty shoot-out scored); Rodríguez (penalty shoot-out missed); Becerra (penalty shoot-out scored); Richter (penalty shoot-out scored)	3–1	(penalty shoot-out missed) Rudder; (penalty shoot-out missed) Holder; (penalty shoot-out scored) Warber; (penalty shoot-out missed) Caitlin

Umpires:
Chahir Panschiri (SUI)
Lance Sarabia (USA)

===== Fifth and sixth place =====
2 April 2017
15:30

Switzerland	2–3	Trinidad and Tobago
Michel 16'; Stomps 21'	Report	Reynos 10'; Te. Marcano 43'; Mouttet 45'

Umpires:
Shane Lewis (BAR)
Tyler Klenk (CAN)

==== First to fourth place classification ====
===== Semifinals =====
1 April 2017
17:45

Canada	4–1	Russia
Pearson 20', 48'; Tupper 26', 29'	Report	Khairullin 11'

Umpires:
Federico García (URU)
Michihiko Watanabe (JPN)

1 April 2017
20:00

United States	0–2	Japan
	Report	Ke. Tanaka 34'; Ka. Tanaka 60'

Umpires:
Andrés Ledesma (ARG)
Tyler Klenk (CAN)

===== Third and fourth place =====
2 April 2017
17:45

Russia	2–2	United States
Yankun 34'; Kuraev 54'	Report	Harris 45'; Sundeen 47'
Penalties
Kornilov (penalty shoot-out missed); Zamalutdinov (penalty shoot-out scored); Khairullin (penalty shoot-out missed); Proskuriakov (penalty shoot-out missed); Yahkun (penalty shoot-out missed)	1–2	(penalty shoot-out missed) Harris; (penalty shoot-out scored) Singh; (penalty shoot-out missed) Dhadwal; (penalty shoot-out scored) Holt

Umpires:
Michihiko Watanabe (JPN)
Andrés Ledesma (ARG)

===== Final =====
2 April 2017
20:00

Canada	1–2	Japan
Tupper 31'	Report	Ke. Tanaka 35'; Saski 40'

Umpires:
Federico García (URU)
Dimitry Zhabin (RUS)

=== Final ranking ===
Qualified for Semifinals

Rank	Team
1	Japan
2	Canada
3	United States
4	Russia
5	Trinidad and Tobago
6	Switzerland
7	Chile
8	Barbados
