= Conor Empey =

Irish field hockey player (born 1998)

Personal information
- Born: 7 August 1998 (age 27) Ireland

Sport
- Sport: Field hockey
- Position: Midfield
Senior career
| Years | Team | Caps | Goals |
| 2002–2019 | TRRHC | - | - |
| 2019–2021 | UCDHC | - | - |
| 2021- | SCHC | - | - |
National team
| Years | Team | Caps | Goals |
| 2017–2019 | Ireland U–21 | 10 | (4) |
| 2021– | Ireland | 36 | (12) |
Medal record
Men's field hockey
Representing Ireland
FIH Nations Cup
| Silver medal – second place | 2022 Potchefstroom | Team |
EuroHockey Championship II
| Gold medal – first place | 2023 Dublin | Team |

Conor Empey (born 7 August 1998) is a field hockey player from Ireland who plays as a midfielder.

== Life ==
Empey was born on 7 August 1998.

== Field hockey ==
=== Domestic league ===
Empey currently competes in the Dutch Hoofdklasse, where he represents SCHC.

In the Irish Hockey League, he formerly represented the Three Rock Rovers.

=== Under–21 ===
Empey made his debut for the Ireland U–21 in 2017 at the EuroHockey Junior Championship in Valencia.

He followed this up with an appearance at the 2019 EuroHockey Junior Championship II in Plzeň Litice.

=== Senior national team ===
Empey made his senior international debut in 2021. He appeared in a test series against Malaysia in Hillsborough.

Since his debut, Empey has been present at a number of international events and has medalled with the national team on two occasions. He took home gold at the 2023 EuroHockey Championship II in Dublin, and silver at the 2022 FIH Nations Cup in Potchefstroom.

He competed at the 2024 FIH Olympic Qualifiers in Valencia.
