= Luke Madeley =

Irish field hockey player (born 1996)

Personal information
- Born: 28 February 1996 (age 30) Dublin, Ireland

Sport
- Sport: Field hockey
- Position: Defence
Senior career
Years	Team	Caps	Goals
–	Gantoise	-	-
2025–2026	Hampstead & Westminster	-	-
National team
Years	Team	Caps	Goals
2017–	Ireland	51	(20)
2017	Ireland U–21	5	(7)
Medal record
Men's field hockey
Representing Ireland
FIH Nations Cup
Silver medal – second place	2022 Potchefstroom	Team
FIH Hockey Series
Silver medal – second place	2018–19 Le Touquet	Team
EuroHockey Championship II
Bronze medal – third place	2021 Gniezno	Team

Robert Luke Madeley (born 28 February 1996) is a field hockey player from Ireland.

== Life ==
Madeley was born in Dublin, Ireland, on 28 February 1996.

== Field hockey ==
=== Domestic league ===
Madeley currently competes in the Belgian Hockey League, where he represents Gantoise.

In the Irish Hockey League, he formerly represented the Three Rock Rovers.

=== Under–21 ===
In 2017, Madeley was a member of the Ireland U–21 at the EuroHockey Junior Championship in Valencia.

=== Senior national team ===
Madeley made his senior international debut in 2017. He appeared in a test series against Pakistan in Lisburn.

Since his debut, Madeley has been present at numerous international events and has medalled with the national team on three occasions. He took home silver at the 2018–19 FIH Series Finals in Le Touquet and 2022 FIH Nations Cup in Potchefstroom, and bronze at the 2021 EuroHockey Championship II in Gniezno.

He competed at the 2024 FIH Olympic Qualifiers in Valencia.
