= Sam Hyland =

Irish field hockey player

Personal information
- Born: 23 December 1998 (age 27) Ireland

Sport
- Sport: Field hockey
- Position: Midfield
Senior career
Years	Team	Caps	Goals
–	YMCA	-	-
National team
Years	Team	Caps	Goals
2019	Ireland U–21	4	(0)
2021–	Ireland	51	(2)
Medal record
Men's field hockey
Representing Ireland
FIH Nations Cup
Silver medal – second place	2022 Potchefstroom	Team
EuroHockey Championship II
Gold medal – first place	2023 Dublin	Team
Bronze medal – third place	2021 Gniezno	Team

Sam Hyland (born 23 December 1998) is a field hockey player from Ireland.

== Life ==
Hyland was born on 23 December 1998.

== Field hockey ==
=== Domestic league ===
Hyland currently competes in the Irish Hockey League, where he represents the YMCA.

=== Under–21 ===
Hyland made his debut for the Ireland U–21s in 2019 at the EuroHockey Junior Championship II in Plzeň Litice.

=== Senior national team ===
Hyland made his senior international debut in 2021. He appeared in a test series against Malaysia in Hillsborough.

Since his debut, Hyland has been present at a number of international events and has medalled with the national team on three occasions. He took home gold at the 2023 EuroHockey Championship II in Dublin, silver at the 2022 FIH Nations Cup in Potchefstroom, and bronze at the 2021 EuroHockey Championship II in Gniezno.

He competed at the 2024 FIH Olympic Qualifiers in Valencia.
