= Benjamin Walker (field hockey) =

Irish field hockey player (born 1999)

Personal information
- Full name: Benjamin Robert Walker
- Born: 13 July 1999 (age 27) Ireland

Sport
- Sport: Field hockey
- Position: Forward
Senior career
Years	Team	Caps	Goals
–	Braxgata	-	-
National team
Years	Team	Caps	Goals
2017–	Ireland	79	(32)
Medal record
Men's field hockey
Representing Ireland
FIH Nations Cup
Silver medal – second place	2022 Potchefstroom	Team
FIH Hockey Series
Silver medal – second place	2018–19 Le Touquet	Team
EuroHockey Championship II
Gold medal – first place	2023 Dublin	Team
Bronze medal – third place	2021 Gniezno	Team

Benjamin Robert Walker (born 13 July 1999) is a field hockey player who plays as a forward for the Ireland men's national field hockey team.

== Life ==
Walker was born on 13 July 1999.

== Field hockey ==
=== Domestic league ===
Walker currently competes in the Belgian Hockey League, where he represents Braxgata.

In the Irish Hockey League, he formerly represented the Three Rock Rovers.

=== Senior national team ===
Walker made his senior international debut in 2017. He appeared in a three-nations tournament in Benalmádena and Málaga.

Since his debut, Walker has been present at numerous international events and has medalled with the national team on four occasions. He took home gold at the 2023 EuroHockey Championship II in Dublin, silver at the 2018–19 FIH Series Finals in Le Touquet and 2022 FIH Nations Cup in Potchefstroom, and bronze at the 2021 EuroHockey Championship II in Gniezno.

He competed at the 2024 FIH Olympic Qualifiers in Valencia.
