= Peter Brown (field hockey) =

Irish field hockey player

Personal information
- Born: 7 July 1994 (age 32) Newry, Northern Ireland

Sport
- Sport: Field hockey
- Position: Midfield
- Club: Banbridge
National team
Years	Team	Caps	Goals
2013–	Ireland	67	(2)
2014–2014	Ireland U–21	8	(1)
Medal record
Men's field hockey
Representing Ireland
EuroHockey U–21 Championship II
Gold medal – first place	2014 Lousada

Peter Brown (born 7 July 1994) is a field hockey player from Northern Ireland.

== Personal life ==
Brown was born in Newry, a town bordering County Down and County Armagh in Northern Ireland. He grew up in the town of Banbridge, nearby his birthplace.

He is an alumnus of Queen's University Belfast and University College Dublin.

== Field hockey ==
=== Domestic league ===
Brown currently competes in the Irish Hockey League, where he plays for Banbridge Hockey Club. He has also represented the side in the Euro Hockey League, the top club competition hosted by the European Hockey Federation.

=== Under–21 ===
Throughout 2014, Brown represented the Ireland U–21 team. He made his first appearances during a Four–Nations Tournament in Belfast. He then went on to represent the side at the 2014 EuroHockey U–21 Championship II in Lousada, where he won a gold medal.

=== Senior national team ===
Brown made his senior international debut for Ireland in 2013. He earned his first senior international cap during Round 2 of the 2012–13 FIH World League in New Delhi.

Following his 2013 debut, Brown represented the team sporadically until 2017. After a seven-year hiatus from the national team, he returned to the national squad in 2024 for the fifth season of the FIH Pro League, travelling with the squad to Bhubaneswar.

In 2024 he officially became an Olympian. He competed in the field hockey competition for Team Ireland at the XXXIII Olympic Games in Paris.

He has since appeared in season six of the FIH Pro League, and has been named to represent the national team at the 2025 EuroHockey Championship II in Lousada.

== International goals ==
The following table lists all goals scored by Brown at international level.

Goal	Date	Location	Opponent	Score	Result	Event	Ref
1	20 February 2013	Major Dhyan Chand National Stadium, New Delhi, India	Fiji	2–0	13–0	2012–13 FIH World League Round 2	
2	24 February 2013	Major Dhyan Chand National Stadium, New Delhi, India	China	1–0	4–0	2012–13 FIH World League Round 2	
