= Kyle Marshall (field hockey) =

Irish field hockey player

Personal information
- Born: 10 July 1998 (age 28) Markethill, Ireland

Sport
- Sport: Field hockey
- Position: Defence
Senior career
Years	Team	Caps	Goals
2021–2026	Old Georgians	-	-
National team
Years	Team	Caps	Goals
2017–2017	Ireland U–21	5	(0)
2019–2019	England U–21	5	(0)
2021–	Ireland	75	(0)
Medal record
Men's field hockey
Representing Ireland
FIH Nations Cup
Silver medal – second place	2022–23 Potchefstroom
EuroHockey Championship II
Gold medal – first place	2023 Dublin
Bronze medal – third place	2021 Gniezno
Representing England
EuroHockey U–21 Championship
Silver medal – second place	2019 Valencia

Kyle Marshall (born 7 July 1998) is a field hockey player from Ireland.

== Personal life ==
Kyle Marshall was born and raised in Markethill, a small village in County Armagh, Ireland.

== Field hockey ==
=== Domestic league ===
Marshall currently competes in the English Hockey League, where he plays for Old Georgians'. He has also represented the side in the Euro Hockey League, the top club competition hosted by the European Hockey Federation.

He also previously competed in the Irish Hockey League for Banbridge Hockey Club.

=== Under–21 ===
Between 2017 and 2019, Marshall represented three separate national U–21 teams. He has competed for the Ireland, England and Great Britain U–21 squads in international competitions. His best result during this time was a silver medal at the 2019 EuroHockey U–21 Championship in Valencia.

=== Senior national team ===
After representing England at junior level in 2019, Marshall switched allegiance back to his home country in 2021. He earned his first call-up to the Ireland squad that year, appearing in a series of practice matches against Scotland. He made his official senior international debut later that year during the EuroHockey Championship II in Gniezno, where he won a bronze medal.

Since his debut, Marshall has been a constant inclusion in the national team. He has medalled with the team on two more occasions, taking home silver at the inaugural edition of the FIH Nations Cup in Potchefstroom in 2022, as well as gold at the 2023 edition of the EuroHockey Championship II in Dublin.

In 2024 he became an Olympian. He competed in the field hockey competition for Team Ireland at the XXXIII Olympic Games in Paris.

Since the Olympic Games in 2024, Marshall has stepped into the captain role of the national team. He led the squad during the sixth season of the FIH Pro League and will lead them again at the 2025 EuroHockey Championship II in Lousada.
