= Field hockey at the 2016 Summer Olympics – Men's qualification =

The qualification for the 2016 Men's Olympic Field hockey Tournament was held from September 2014 to October 2015. There were three qualification events, host country, continental championship, and 2014–15 FIH Hockey World League Semifinals respectively. Total twelve teams could participated in the 2016 Summer Olympics.

== Qualification summary ==
Dates	Event	Location	Qualifier
20 September – 2 October 2014	2014 Asian Games	Incheon, South Korea	India
3–14 June 2015	2014–15 FIH Hockey World League Semifinals	Buenos Aires, Argentina	Germany
3–14 June 2015	2014–15 FIH Hockey World League Semifinals	Buenos Aires, Argentina	Canada
3–14 June 2015	2014–15 FIH Hockey World League Semifinals	Buenos Aires, Argentina	Spain
3–14 June 2015	2014–15 FIH Hockey World League Semifinals	Buenos Aires, Argentina	New Zealand
20 June – 5 July 2015	2014–15 FIH Hockey World League Semifinals	Antwerp, Belgium	Belgium
20 June – 5 July 2015	2014–15 FIH Hockey World League Semifinals	Antwerp, Belgium	Great Britain
20 June – 5 July 2015	2014–15 FIH Hockey World League Semifinals	Antwerp, Belgium	Ireland
21 July 2015	Host nation	Toronto, Canada	Brazil
14–25 July 2015	2015 Pan American Games	Toronto, Canada	Argentina
21–29 August 2015	2015 EuroHockey Nations Championship	(United Kingdom) London, England	Netherlands
21–25 October 2015	2015 Oceania Cup	Stratford, New Zealand	Australia
23 October – 1 November 2015	2015 African Qualifying Tournament	Randburg, South Africa	— (Note: South Africa won the continental qualifier however the team did not participate in the 2016 Olympics. South African Sports Confederation and Olympic Committee (SASCOC) and South African Hockey Association (SAHA) made an agreement on the Rio 2016 Olympics qualification criteria that the Continental Qualification route would not be considered. As a result, New Zealand, as the highest-ranked team from the 2014-15 Hockey World League Semifinals not already qualified, participated instead.)
Total			12

== Host country ==
Each of the continental champions receives a berth alongside the host Brazil, while another six spots will be decided in the 2014–2015 FIH Hockey World League. As the host nation, Brazil has guaranteed a quota places if it satisfies the following performance criteria set by FIH: the men's team should either obtain a world ranking equal to or better than thirtieth place by the end of 2014, or not finish lower than sixth at the 2015 Pan American Games.

- Brazil qualified by finishing the fourth in the 2015 Pan American Games

== Continental Qualification Tournament ==
Qualified for the 2016 Summer Olympics

=== Africa ===
Rank	Team
1st place, gold medalist(s)	South Africa
2nd place, silver medalist(s)	Egypt
3rd place, bronze medalist(s)	Kenya
4	Ghana
5	Nigeria
6	Zimbabwe
7	Namibia
8	Tanzania
8	Botswana

=== America ===
Rank	Team
1st place, gold medalist(s)	Argentina
2nd place, silver medalist(s)	Canada
3rd place, bronze medalist(s)	Chile
4	Brazil
5	United States
6	Mexico
7	Trinidad and Tobago
8	Cuba

=== Asia ===
Rank	Men
1st place, gold medalist(s)	India
2nd place, silver medalist(s)	Pakistan
3rd place, bronze medalist(s)	South Korea
4	Malaysia
5	China
6	Japan
7	Oman
8	Bangladesh
9	Sri Lanka
10	Singapore

=== Europe ===
Rank	Team
Gold medal	Netherlands
Silver medal	Germany
Bronze medal	Ireland
4	England
5	Belgium
6	Spain
7	France
8	Russia

=== Oceania ===
Rank	Team
Gold medal	Australia
Silver medal	New Zealand
Bronze medal	Fiji
4	Samoa

== 2014–15 World League Semifinals ==
Qualified for the 2016 Summer Olympics

Rank	Buenos Aires	Antwerp
1	Germany	Australia
2	Argentina	Belgium
3	Netherlands	Great Britain
4	Canada	India
5	Spain	Ireland
6	New Zealand	Malaysia
7	South Korea	France
8	Japan	Pakistan
9	Egypt	Poland
10	Austria	China
