= Japan Hockey Association =

Governing body of field hockey in Japan

- Sport: Field hockey
- Jurisdiction: Japan
- Founded: November 18, 1923
- Affiliation: FIH
- Regional affiliation: AHF
- President: Kazuyasu Misu
- Secretary: Nobuo Ishikawa
- Men's coach: Akira Takahashi
- Women's coach: Jude Menezes

Official website
- www.hockey.or.jp
- (Japan)

The Japan Hockey Association is the governing body of field hockey in Japan. It is affiliated to IHF International Hockey Federation and AHF Asian Hockey Federation. The headquarters of the federation are in Tokyo, Japan.

Kazuyasu Misu is the President of the Japan Hockey Association and Nobuo Ishikawa is the General Secretary.

== See also ==
- Japan men's national field hockey team
- Japan women's national field hockey team
