= 2026–27 Men's FIH Hockey Nations Cup =

5th edition of the Men's FIH Hockey Nations Cup

Tournament details
- Host country: Pakistan
- City: Lahore
- Dates: 19–28 February, 2027
- Teams: 10 (from 5 confederations)
- Venue: National Hockey Stadium

The 2026–27 Men's FIH Hockey Nations Cup is the fifth edition of the Men's FIH Hockey Nations Cup, the annual qualification tournament for the Men's FIH Pro League organised by the International Hockey Federation. The tournament is scheduled to be held at the National Hockey Stadium in Lahore, Pakistan from 19 to 28 February 2027.

== Participating teams ==
It is the first time that the competition has expanded from an eight-team roster to a 10-team format. The participants are determined based on the FIH World Rankings and the promotion/relegation results from the previous 2025–26 season.

- Pakistan (host nation)
- Egypt
- Ireland
- Japan
- Malaysia
- New Zealand
- Scotland
- South Africa
- South Korea
- United States

== Format ==
The ten teams will be split into two pools of five. After a round-robin stage, the top two teams from each pool will advance to the semi-finals, while the remaining teams will play in classification matches for the 5th to 10th place.

== See also ==
- Women's FIH Hockey Nations Cup
- Men's FIH Pro League
