= 2022 Men's FIH Hockey Nations Cup =

Men's field hockey tournament held in South Africa

Tournament details
- Host country: South Africa
- City: Potchefstroom
- Dates: 28 November – 4 December
- Teams: 8 (from 4 confederations)
- Venue: NWU Astro

Final positions
- Champions: South Africa (1st title)
- Runner-up: Ireland
- Third place: South Korea

Tournament statistics
- Matches played: 20
- Goals scored: 93 (4.65 per match)
- Top scorer: (South Korea) Jang Jong-hyun (7 goals)
- Best player: (South Africa) Dayaan Cassiem
- Best young player: (France) Corentin Sellier
- Best goalkeeper: (South Korea) Kim Jaeh-yeon

The 2022 Men's FIH Hockey Nations Cup was the first edition of the Men's FIH Hockey Nations Cup, the annual qualification tournament for the Men's FIH Pro League organised by the International Hockey Federation. The tournament was held at the NWU Astro in Potchefstroom, South Africa from 28 November to 4 December 2022.

South Africa beat Ireland in the final and as the winners were promoted to the 2023–24 Men's FIH Pro League.

== Teams ==
The eight highest ranked teams not participating in the Men's FIH Pro League participated in the tournament:

- Canada
- France
- Ireland
- Japan
- South Korea
- Malaysia
- Pakistan
- South Africa

== Preliminary round ==
All times are local (UTC+2).

=== Pool A ===
Pos	Team	Pld	W	D	L	GF	GA	GD	Pts	Qualification
1	Ireland	3	3	0	0	6	2	+4	9	Semi-finals
2	South Africa (H)	3	2	0	1	8	4	+4	6	Semi-finals
3	France	3	0	1	2	5	7	−2	1	
4	Pakistan	3	0	1	2	6	12	−6	1	

Source: FIH
Rules for classification: 1) points; 2) matches won; 3) goal difference; 4) goals for; 5) head-to-head result; 6) field goals scored.
(H) Hosts

28 November 2022
11:00

France	1–2	Ireland
Charlet 26'	Report	Duncan 22'; O'Donoghue 45'

Umpires:
Gabriel Labate (ARG)
Zeke Newman (AUS)

28 November 2022
15:00

South Africa	6–2	Pakistan
Dlungwana 9'; M. Cassiem 26'; Mvimbi 28'; Kok 41'; D. Cassiem 46'; Horne 57'	Report	Khan 14'; Liaqat 51'

Umpires:
Tim Meissner (GER)
Nazmi Kamaruddin (MAS)

29 November 2022
11:00

Ireland	3–1	Pakistan
Empey 18'; Walker 32'; O'Donoghue 50'	Report	Shahid 17'

Umpires:
Ayden Shrives (RSA)
Sébastien Michielsen (BEL)

29 November 2022
15:00

South Africa	2–1	France
Kok 13'; Horne 47'	Report	Sellier 12'

Umpires:
Benjamin Peters (USA)
Bevan Nichol (NZL)

1 December 2022
11:00

France	3–3	Pakistan
Van Straaten 12'; Jouin 36'; Charlet 58'	Report	Rana 9'; Hakeem 28'; Ahmad 60'

Umpires:
Gabriel Labate (ARG)
Nazmi Kamaruddin (MAS)

1 December 2022
15:00

Ireland	1–0	South Africa
O'Donoghue 8'	Report

Umpires:
Aziz Adimah (GHA)
Benjamin Peters (USA)

=== Pool B ===
Pos	Team	Pld	W	D	L	GF	GA	GD	Pts	Qualification
1	South Korea	3	3	0	0	10	3	+7	9	Semi-finals
2	Malaysia	3	2	0	1	8	4	+4	6	Semi-finals
3	Japan	3	1	0	2	5	8	−3	3	
4	Canada	3	0	0	3	4	12	−8	0	

Source: FIH
Rules for classification: 1) points; 2) matches won; 3) goal difference; 4) goals for; 5) head-to-head result; 6) field goals scored.

28 November 2022
09:00

Canada	0–3	Japan
	Report	Nagayoshi 23', 35'; Takade 29'

Umpires:
Aziz Adimah (GHA)
Sébastien Michielsen (BEL)

28 November 2022
13:00

Malaysia	0–1	South Korea
	Report	Jang 5'

Umpires:
Bevan Nichol (NZL)
Hideki Kinoshita (JPN)

29 November 2022
09:00

South Korea	3–1	Japan
Jang 15', 45'; Kim S. 18'	Report	Niwa 29'

Umpires:
Gabriel Labate (ARG)
Nazmi Kamaruddin (MAS)

29 November 2022
13:00

Canada	2–3	Malaysia
Davis 19'; Johnston 40'	Report	Ashari 33'; Azrai 50', 57'

Umpires:
Hideki Kinoshita (JPN)
Tim Meissner (GER)

1 December 2022
09:00

South Korea	6–2	Canada
Jang 27', 35'; Jeon 38'; Lee J. 48'; Kim H. 52'; Seo 57'	Report	Johnston 17', 59'

Umpires:
Tim Meissner (GER)
Sébastien Michielsen (BEL)

1 December 2022
13:00

Malaysia	5–1	Japan
Hassan 2', 39'; Aminudin 23'; Saari 34'; Hamsani 40'	Report	Kawabe 5'

Umpires:
Ayden Shrives (RSA)
Zeke Newman (AUS)

== Classification round ==
=== Bracket ===
5–8th place semifinals
3 December
France	7
Canada	1
3 December
Japan	3
Pakistan	1

Fifth place
4 December
France (p.s.o.)	2 (4)
Japan	2 (2)
Seventh place
4 December
Canada	4
Pakistan	5

=== 5–8th place semifinals ===
3 December 2022
09:00

France	7–1	Canada
Charlet 15', 27'; Rogeau 30', 32', 43'; Jouin 37'; Delemazure 55'	Report	Sarmento 47'

Umpires:
Aziz Adimah (GHA)
Hideki Kinoshita (JPN)

3 December 2022
11:15

Japan	3–1	Pakistan
Nagayoshi 27'; Kawabe 47'; Fukuda 54'	Report	Rooman 48'

Umpires:
Benjamin Peters (USA)
Bevan Nichol (NZL)

=== Seventh and eighth place ===
4 December 2022
08:30

Canada	4–5	Pakistan
Davis 10'; Scholfield 29'; Johnston 48'; Tardif 53'	Report	Ahmad 3'; Murtaza 7'; Shahid 46'; Rana 54'; Bashir 58'

Umpires:
Aziz Adimah (GHA)
Ayden Shrives (RSA)

=== Fifth and sixth place ===
4 December 2022
10:45

France	2–2	Japan
Charlet 7'; T. Clément 15'	Report	Fukuda 31'; Nagayoshi 46'
Penalties
T. Clément (penalty shoot-out scored); Jouin (penalty shoot-out scored); Tynevez (penalty shoot-out scored); Baumgarten (penalty shoot-out scored)	4–2	(penalty shoot-out missed) Yamasaki; (penalty shoot-out missed) Niwa; (penalty shoot-out missed) Fukuda; (penalty shoot-out scored) S. Tanaka

Umpires:
Zeke Newman (AUS)
Benjamin Peters (USA)

== Final round ==
=== Bracket ===
Semi-finals
3 December
Ireland	3
Malaysia	0
3 December
South Korea	1 (2)
South Africa (p.s.o.)	1 (3)

Final
4 December
Ireland	3
South Africa	4
Third place
4 December
Malaysia	0
South Korea	4

=== Semi-finals ===
3 December 2022
13:30

Ireland	3–0	Malaysia
Walker 41'; Duncan 43', 52'	Report

Umpires:
Ayden Shrives (RSA)
Tim Meissner (GER)

3 December 2022
15:45

South Korea	1–1	South Africa
Jang 52'	Report	Kok 31'
Penalties
Lee J. (penalty shoot-out missed); Hwang (penalty shoot-out scored); Ji (penalty shoot-out missed); Lee H. (penalty shoot-out scored); Jung (penalty shoot-out missed)	2–3	(penalty shoot-out missed) D. Cassiem; (penalty shoot-out scored) Sherwood; (penalty shoot-out missed) Julius; (penalty shoot-out scored) Dlungwana; (penalty shoot-out scored) M. Cassiem

Umpires:
Nazmi Kamaruddin (MAS)
Zeke Newman (AUS)

=== Third and fourth place ===
4 December 2022
13:00

Malaysia	0–4	South Korea
	Report	Seo 22'; Lee N. 26'; Hwang 39'; Jang 59'

Umpires:
Hideki Kinoshita (JPN)
Bevan Nichol (NZL)

=== Final ===
4 December 2022
15:15

Ireland	3–4	South Africa
O'Donoghue 19', 36'; McKee 45'	Report	D. Cassiem 4', 29'; Kok 31'; M. Cassiem 49'

Umpires:
Gabriel Labate (ARG)
Sébastien Michielsen (BEL)

== Goalscorers ==
There were 93 goals scored in 20 matches, for an average of 4.65 goals per match.

7 goals

- (South Korea) Jang Jong-hyun

5 goals

- (France) Victor Charlet
- (Ireland) Shane O'Donoghue

4 goals

- (Canada) Gordon Johnston
- (Japan) Ken Nagayoshi
- (South Africa) Tevin Kok

3 goals

- (France) Blaise Rogeau
- (Ireland) Jeremy Duncan
- (South Africa) Dayaan Cassiem

2 goals

- (Canada) Sean Davis
- (France) Noé Jouin
- (Ireland) Benjamin Walker
- (Japan) Kentaro Fukuda
- (Japan) Kosei Kawabe
- (Malaysia) Abu Kamal Azrai
- (Malaysia) Najib Hassan
- (Pakistan) Arbaz Ahmad
- (Pakistan) Abdul Rana
- (Pakistan) Rooman Khan
- (Pakistan) Hannan Shahid
- (South Africa) Mustapha Cassiem
- (South Africa) Keenan Horne
- (South Korea) Seo In-woo

1 goal

- (Canada) Matthew Sarmento
- (Canada) Oliver Scholfield
- (Canada) Christopher Tardif
- (France) Timothée Clément
- (France) Brieuc Delemazure
- (France) Corentin Sellier
- (France) Pieter van Straaten
- (Ireland) Conor Empey
- (Ireland) John McKee
- (Japan) Takuma Niwa
- (Japan) Taiki Takade
- (Malaysia) Firhan Ashari
- (Malaysia) Ashran Hamsani
- (Malaysia) Muhamad Aminudin
- (Malaysia) Faizal Saari
- (Pakistan) Afraz Hakeem
- (Pakistan) Usama Bashir
- (Pakistan) Arshad Liaqat
- (Pakistan) Muhammad Murtaza
- (South Africa) Tyson Dlungwana
- (South Africa) Samkelo Mvimbi
- (South Korea) Hwang Tae-il
- (South Korea) Jeon Byung-jin
- (South Korea) Kim Hyeon-hong
- (South Korea) Kim Sung-hyun
- (South Korea) Lee Jung-jun
- (South Korea) Lee Nam-yong

Source: FIH

== Final standing ==
Rank	Team
1st place, gold medalist(s)	South Africa
2nd place, silver medalist(s)	Ireland
3rd place, bronze medalist(s)	South Korea
4	Malaysia
5	France
6	Japan
7	Pakistan
8	Canada

Qualified for the 2023–24 Men's FIH Pro League

== Awards ==
The awards were announced on 4 December 2022.

Award	Player
Player of the tournament	(South Africa) Dayaan Cassiem
Goalkeeper of the tournament	(South Korea) Kim Jae-hyeon
Young player of the tournament	(France) Corentin Sellier

== See also ==
- 2022 Women's FIH Hockey Nations Cup
- 2022–23 Men's FIH Pro League
