= Daragh Walsh =

Irish field hockey player (born 1997)

Personal information
- Full name: Daragh James Walsh
- Born: 27 August 1997 (age 28) Dublin, Ireland

Sport
- Sport: Field hockey
- Position: Midfield
Senior career
Years	Team	Caps	Goals
–	Braxgata	-	-
National team
Years	Team	Caps	Goals
2014	Ireland U–21	5	(0)
2017–	Ireland	86	(8)
Medal record
Men's field hockey
Representing Ireland
FIH Hockey Series
Silver medal – second place	2018–19 Le Touquet	Team
EuroHockey Championship II
Gold medal – first place	2023 Dublin	Team

Daragh James Walsh (born 27 August 1997) is a field hockey player from Ireland.

== Life ==
Walsh was born on 27 August 1997.

He is sponsored by Ritual Hockey.

== Field hockey ==
=== Domestic league ===
Walsh currently competes in the Belgian Hockey League, where he represents Braxgata.

He formerly represented the Three Rock Rovers in the Irish Hockey League.

=== Under–21 ===
He made his debut for the Irish U–21 team in 2014 at the EuroHockey Junior Championship II in Lousada.

=== Senior national team ===
Walsh made his senior international debut in 2017. He appeared in a test series against Pakistan in Lisburn.

Since his debut, Walsh has been present at numerous international events. He has medalled twice with the national team, taking home gold at the 2023 edition of the EuroHockey Championship II, and silver at the 2018–19 FIH Series Finals in Le Touquet.

In 2018 he was a member of the Irish squad at the FIH World Cup held in Bhubaneswar.

He competed at the 2024 FIH Olympic Qualifiers in Valencia.
