= Billy McConnell (field hockey) =

Great Britain and Ireland hockey player

Personal information
- Born: 19 April 1956 (age 70) Newry, County Down; Northern Ireland
- Height: 177 cm (5 ft 10 in)
- Weight: 73 kg (161 lb)

Sport
- Sport: Field hockey
- Position: Defender
Senior career
Years	Team	Caps	Goals
19xx–19xx	Newry Olympic	-	-
198x–198x	Belfast YMCA	-	-
19xx–19xx	→ Ulster	-	-
19xx–199x	Holywood 87	-	-
National team
Years	Team	Caps	Goals
1979–199x	Ireland		-
198x–198x	Great Britain		-
Coaching career
- 2007–2010: Pegasus
- 201x–201x: Queen's University
Medal record
Representing Great Britain
Olympic Games
Bronze medal – third place	1984 Los Angeles	Team
Champions Trophy
Silver medal – second place	1985 Perth	Team
Bronze medal – third place	1984 Karachi	Team
Representing Ireland
EuroHockey Junior Championship
Silver medal – second place	1978 Dublin	Team

William David Robert McConnell (born 19 April 1956) is a former field hockey player from Northern Ireland who represented both Ireland and Great Britain at international level. He represented Great Britain at the 1984 Summer Olympics when they won the bronze medal. He also represented Ireland at the 1990 Men's Hockey World Cup.

== Domestic teams ==
McConnell played club field hockey for Newry Olympic, Belfast YMCA and Holywood 87.

== International ==
=== Ireland ===
McConnell was a member of the Ireland team that were silver medallists at the 1978 EuroHockey Junior Championship. Other members of the team included Martin Sloan, Jimmy Kirkwood and Stephen Martin. He made his senior Ireland debut in 1979 against the Netherlands. He subsequently represented Ireland at the 1990 Men's Hockey World Cup. In 2010 he was inducted into the Irish Hockey Association Hall of Fame.

=== Great Britain ===
McConnell represented Great Britain at the 1984 Summer Olympics. McConnell also represented Great Britain in Champions Trophy tournaments, winning a bronze medal in 1984 and a silver in 1985.

Tournaments	Place	Team
1978 EuroHockey Junior Championship	2nd place, silver medalist(s)	Ireland
1984 Summer Olympics	3rd place, bronze medalist(s)	Great Britain
1984 Men's Hockey Champions Trophy	3rd place, bronze medalist(s)	Great Britain
1985 Men's Hockey Champions Trophy	2nd place, silver medalist(s)	Great Britain
1986 Men's Hockey Champions Trophy	4th	Great Britain
1987 Men's Hockey Champions Trophy	4th	Great Britain
1989 Intercontinental Cup		Ireland
1990 Men's Hockey World Cup	12th	Ireland

== Later years ==
Between 2007 and 2010 McConnell coached Pegasus. At the time, the Pegasus squad included his daughter, Kate McConnell. Kate was an Ireland women's field hockey international and in 2010–11 was a member of the Pegasus team that won a Women's Irish Hockey League/Irish Senior Cup. She also captained Pegasus. Billy McConnell has also coached at Queen's University.
