= Mainul Islam =

Mainul Islam or Mohammad Mainul Islam may refer to:

- Muinul Islam (born 1950), Bangladeshi economist
- Mohammad Mainul Islam (general) (born 1959), Bangladeshi lieutenant general
- Md. Mainul Islam (police officer), Bangladeshi diplomat and police officer
- Moinul Islam (cricketer, born 1992), Bangladeshi cricketer
- Moinul Islam (cricketer, born 1996), Bangladeshi cricketer

== See also ==
- Monirul Islam (disambiguation)
