= 2024 Men's FIH Hockey Olympic Qualifiers =

Field hockey tournament

Tournament details
- Host countries: Oman; Spain
- Dates: 13–21 January
- Teams: 16 (from 5 confederations)
- Venue: 2 (in 2 host cities)

The 2024 Men's FIH Olympic Qualifiers was the final stage of the qualification for the men's field hockey event at the 2024 Summer Olympics. It was held in Muscat, Oman and Valencia, Spain between 13 and 21 January 2024.

Belgium, Germany, Great Britain, Ireland, New Zealand and Spain qualified for the Olympics.

== Format ==
Teams not qualifying from the continental qualification tournament were participating in this tournament according to the respective spots received by the FIH. The 16 teams were split into two eight-team tournaments. In each tournament the eight teams were divided into two four-team pools. After the round-robin stage the top two teams advanced to the semifinals. The top three teams of each tournament qualified for the Olympics.

== Qualified teams ==
Qualification	Date	Host	Berths	Qualified team
2023 EuroHockey Championship II	23–29 July 2023	(Republic of Ireland) Dublin	2	Ireland; Ukraine
2023 Oceania Cup	10–13 August 2023	(New Zealand) Whangārei	1	New Zealand
2023 EuroHockey Championship	19–27 August 2023	(Germany) Mönchengladbach	5	Great Britain; Belgium; Germany; Spain; Austria
2022 Asian Games	24 September − 6 October 2023	(China) Hangzhou	5	Japan; South Korea; China; Pakistan; Malaysia
2023 Pan American Games	25 October – 3 November 2023	(Chile) Santiago	2	Chile; Canada
2023 African Olympic Qualifier	29 October – 5 November 2023	(South Africa) Pretoria	1	Egypt
Total			16	

== Tournament 1 ==
2024 Men's FIH Hockey Olympic Qualifiers Oman
Tournament details
- Host country: Oman
- City: Muscat
- Dates: 15–21 January
- Teams: 8 (from 4 confederations)
- Venue: Hockey Oman

Final positions
- Champions: Germany
- Runner-up: Great Britain
- Third place: New Zealand

Tournament statistics
- Matches played: 20
- Goals scored: 89 (4.45 per match)
- Top scorer: (United Kingdom) Sam Ward (8 goals)

The tournament was held in Muscat, Oman from 15 to 21 January 2024.

=== Teams ===
- Canada
- Chile
- China
- Germany
- Great Britain
- Malaysia
- New Zealand
- Pakistan

All times are local (UTC+4).

=== Preliminary round ===
==== Pool A ====
Pos	Team	Pld	W	D	L	GF	GA	GD	Pts	Qualification
1	Great Britain	3	3	0	0	16	2	+14	9	Semi-finals
2	Pakistan	3	1	1	1	6	9	−3	4	Semi-finals
3	China	3	1	0	2	3	10	−7	3	Classification round
4	Malaysia	3	0	1	2	6	10	−4	1	Classification round

Source: FIH
Rules for classification: 1) points; 2) matches won; 3) goal difference; 4) goals for; 5) head-to-head result; 6) field goals for.

15 January 2024
18:00

Malaysia	2–3	China
Azrai 28'; Rahim 47'	Report	Lin C. 31'; Chao 34'; Gao 60+'

Umpires:
Gareth Greenfield (NZL)
Tyler Klenk (CAN)

15 January 2024
20:00

Great Britain	6–1	Pakistan
Waller 10'; Ward 28', 41'; Calnan 43'; Wallace 52'; Bandurak 57'	Report	Shahid 50'

Umpires:
Gabriel Labate (ARG)
Darren Hubach (RSA)

16 January 2024
18:00

Pakistan	2–0	China
Mahmood 42'; Rehman 51'	Report

Umpires:
Gareth Greenfield (NZL)
Ahmed El-Sayed (EGY)

16 January 2024
20:00

Malaysia	1–4	Great Britain
Saabah 26'	Report	Calnan 19'; Ward 32', 58'; Wallace 39'

Umpires:
Steve Rogers (AUS)
Hideki Kinoshita (JPN)

18 January 2024
18:00

Great Britain	6–0	China
Roper 3'; Ward 16', 34'; Wallace 29', 48'; Calnan 36'	Report

Umpires:
Sean Rapaport (RSA)
Tyler Klenk (CAN)

18 January 2024
20:00

Pakistan	3–3	Malaysia
Khan 23'; Butt 33'; Rana 52'	Report	Saari 20'; Azrai 30'; Ashari 41'

Umpires:
Gareth Greenfield (NZL)
Gabriel Labate (ARG)

==== Pool B ====
Pos	Team	Pld	W	D	L	GF	GA	GD	Pts	Qualification
1	Germany	3	2	1	0	14	2	+12	7	Semi-finals
2	New Zealand	3	2	1	0	9	3	+6	7	Semi-finals
3	Chile	3	1	0	2	4	8	−4	3	Classification round
4	Canada	3	0	0	3	2	16	−14	0	Classification round

Source: FIH
Rules for classification: 1) points; 2) matches won; 3) goal difference; 4) goals for; 5) head-to-head result; 6) field goals for.

15 January 2024
14:00

Germany	9–0	Canada
Peillat 2', 36'; Rühr 9', 34'; Hartkopf 12', 16'; Miltkau 37'; Wellen 56'; T. Grambusch 58'	Report

Umpires:
Paul Walker (ENG)
Hideki Kinoshita (JPN)

15 January 2024
16:00

New Zealand	3–1	Chile
Smith 6'; Boyde 13'; Lane 45'	Report	Becerra 60'

Umpires:
Steve Rogers (AUS)
Ahmed El-Sayed (EGY)

16 January 2024
14:00

Canada	2–3	Chile
Johnston 7', 58'	Report	Renz 14'; Maldonado 28', 45'

Umpires:
Sean Rapaport (RSA)
Darren Hubach (RSA)

16 January 2024
16:00

New Zealand	2–2	Germany
Findlay 1'; Phillips 43'	Report	Peillat 17'; T. Grambusch 22'

Umpires:
Gabriel Labate (ARG)
Sean Edwards (ENG)

18 January 2024
14:00

Germany	3–0	Chile
T. Grambusch 15'; Peillat 22'; Weigand 49'	Report

Umpires:
Paul Walker (ENG)
Sean Edwards (ENG)

18 January 2024
16:00

Canada	0–4	New Zealand
	Report	Smith 6'; Houlbrooke 21'; Lane 23'; Inglis 42'

Umpires:
Steve Rogers (AUS)
Darren Hubach (RSA)

=== Classification round ===
Crossover
20 January
China	1
Canada	3
20 January
Chile	0
Malaysia	5

Fifth place
21 January
Canada	0 (1)
Malaysia (p.s.o.)	0 (3)
Seventh place
21 January
China	3 (4)
Chile (p.s.o.)	3 (5)

==== Crossover ====
20 January 2024
13:00

China	1–3	Canada
Chao 21'	Report	Van Son 2'; Boothroyd 20'; Johnston 33'

Umpires:
Hideki Kinoshita (JPN)
Sean Edwards (ENG)

20 January 2024
15:15

Chile	0–5	Malaysia
	Report	Rahim 32'; Hamsani 34'; Jalil 41'; Sumantri 48'; Azrai 60'

Umpires:
Sean Rapaport (RSA)
Ahmed El-Sayed (EGY)

==== Seventh and eighth place ====
21 January 2024
13:00

China	3–3	Chile
Chen Q. 31'; Du S. 39'; Du T. 59'	Report	Renz 17'; Hurtado 21'; Amoroso 40'
Penalties
Lin C. (penalty shoot-out missed); Chen Q. (penalty shoot-out scored); Chao (penalty shoot-out scored); Chen Cho. (penalty shoot-out scored); Gao (penalty shoot-out scored)	4–5	(penalty shoot-out scored) Hurtado; (penalty shoot-out scored) Beccera; (penalty shoot-out scored) R. Valenzuela; (penalty shoot-out scored) Gesswein; (penalty shoot-out scored) Maldonado

Umpires:
Sean Edwards (ENG)
Darren Hubach (RSA)

==== Fifth and sixth place ====
21 January 2024
15:15

Canada	0–0	Malaysia
	Report
Penalties
Johnston (penalty shoot-out missed); Bissett (penalty shoot-out missed); Van Son (penalty shoot-out scored); Panesar (penalty shoot-out missed)	1–3	(penalty shoot-out scored) Ashari; (penalty shoot-out scored) Rozemi; (penalty shoot-out scored) Azrai

Umpires:
Paul Walker (ENG)
Ahmed El-Sayed (EGY)

=== Medal round ===
Semi-finals
20 January
Great Britain	3
New Zealand	1
20 January
Germany	4
Pakistan	0

Final
21 January
Great Britain	0
Germany	1
Third place
21 January
New Zealand	3
Pakistan	2

==== Semi-finals ====
20 January 2024
18:00

Germany	4–0	Pakistan
T. Grambusch 11'; Wellen 17', 40'; Weigand 39'	Report

Umpires:
Gareth Greenfield (NZL)
Paul Walker (ENG)

20 January 2024
20:15

Great Britain	3–1	New Zealand
Roper 18'; Ward 19', 45+'	Report	Russell 26'

Umpires:
Steve Rogers (AUS)
Tyler Klenk (CAN)

==== Third and fourth place ====
21 January 2024
18:00

New Zealand	3–2	Pakistan
Boyde 24', 58'; Inglis 52'	Report	Mahmood 18', 24'

Umpires:
Sean Rapaport (RSA)
Gabriel Labate (ARG)

==== Final ====
21 January 2024
20:15

Great Britain	0–1	Germany
	Report	Zwicker 56'

Umpires:
Tyler Klenk (CAN)
Hideki Kinoshita (JPN)

=== Final standings ===
Pos	Team	Qualification
1	Germany	2024 Summer Olympics
2	Great Britain	2024 Summer Olympics
3	New Zealand	2024 Summer Olympics
4	Pakistan	
5	Malaysia	
6	Canada	
7	Chile	
8	China	

Source: FIH

=== Goalscorers ===
There were 89 goals scored in 20 matches, for an average of 4.45 goals per match.

8 goals

- (United Kingdom) Samuel Ward

4 goals

- (Germany) Tom Grambusch
- (Germany) Gonzalo Peillat
- (United Kingdom) Zachary Wallace

3 goals

- (Canada) Gordon Johnston
- (Germany) Niklas Wellen
- (Malaysia) Abu Kamal Azrai
- (New Zealand) Scott Boyde
- (Pakistan) Abu Mahmood

2 goals

- (Chile) José Maldonado
- (Chile) Felipe Renz
- (China) Chao Jieming
- (Germany) Raphael Hartkopf
- (Germany) Christopher Rühr
- (Germany) Justus Weigand
- (United Kingdom) Will Calnan
- (United Kingdom) Phil Roper
- (Malaysia) Razie Rahim
- (New Zealand) Hugo Inglis
- (New Zealand) Samuel Lane
- (New Zealand) Jacob Smith

1 goal

- (Canada) Fin Boothroyd
- (Canada) Floris van Son
- (Chile) Agustín Amoroso
- (Chile) Franco Becerra
- (Chile) José Hurtado
- (China) Chen Qijun
- (China) Du Shihao
- (China) Du Talake
- (China) Gao Jiesheng
- (China) Lin Changliang
- (Germany) Marco Miltkau
- (Germany) Martin Zwicker
- (United Kingdom) Nick Bandurak
- (United Kingdom) James Mazarelo
- (United Kingdom) Jack Waller
- (Malaysia) Firhan Ashari
- (Malaysia) Ashran Hamsani
- (Malaysia) Marhan Jalil
- (Malaysia) Shahril Saabah
- (Malaysia) Fitri Saari
- (Malaysia) Norsyafiq Sumantri
- (New Zealand) Sean Findlay
- (New Zealand) Isaac Houlbrooke
- (New Zealand) Hayden Phillips
- (New Zealand) Kane Russell
- (Pakistan) Abdul Rehman
- (Pakistan) Ammad Butt
- (Pakistan) Sufyan Khan
- (Pakistan) Waheed Rana
- (Pakistan) Hannan Shahid

Source: FIH

== Tournament 2 ==
2024 Men's FIH Hockey Olympic Qualifiers Spain
Tournament details
- Host country: Spain
- City: Valencia
- Dates: 13–21 January
- Teams: 8 (from 3 confederations)
- Venue: Estadio Betero

Final positions
- Champions: Belgium
- Runner-up: Spain
- Third place: Ireland

Tournament statistics
- Matches played: 20
- Goals scored: 116 (5.8 per match)
- Top scorer: (Belgium) Tom Boon (7 goals)

The tournament was held in Valencia, Spain from 13 to 21 January 2024.

=== Teams ===
- Austria
- Belgium
- Egypt
- Ireland
- Japan
- South Korea
- Spain
- Ukraine

All times are local (UTC+1).

=== Preliminary round ===
==== Pool A ====
Pos	Team	Pld	W	D	L	GF	GA	GD	Pts	Qualification
1	Belgium	3	3	0	0	23	2	+21	9	Semi-finals
2	Ireland	3	2	0	1	8	5	+3	6	Semi-finals
3	Japan	3	1	0	2	5	10	−5	3	Classification round
4	Ukraine	3	0	0	3	3	22	−19	0	Classification round

Source: FIH
Rules for classification: 1) points; 2) matches won; 3) goal difference; 4) goals for; 5) head-to-head result; 6) field goals for.

14 January 2024
18:30

Belgium	7–0	Japan
Luypaert 22'; Cosyns 44'; Onana 45'; Boon 46', 60'; Van Aubel 58', 60'	Report

Umpires:
Rawi Anbananthan (MAS)
Zeke Newman (AUS)

14 January 2024
20:45

Ireland	5–1	Ukraine
Johnson 25'; Cole 29', 51'; Duncan 53'; Walsh 55'	Report	Paziuk 29'

Umpires:
Ilanggo Kanabathu (MAS)
Ben Göntgen (GER)

15 January 2024
17:00

Japan	5–2	Ukraine
Niwa 18'; Fukuda 23', 37'; Nagayoshi 29'; Yamasaki 29'	Report	Paziuk 7'; Koshelenko 14'

Umpires:
Tim Meissner (GER)
Michiel Otten (NED)

15 January 2024
19:15

Ireland	2–4	Belgium
Johnson 26'; Nelson 53'	Report	Denayer 13'; Hendrickx 25'; Ghislain 30'; Stockbroekx 32'

Umpires:
David Tomlinson (NZL)
Nick Bennett (ENG)

17 January 2024
17:00

Belgium	12–0	Ukraine
Ghislain 11', 32'; Hendrickx 19', 47'; Stockbroekx 21', 51'; Van Aubel 23'; Boon 27', 35', 42'; Cosyns 49'; Onana 55'	Report

Umpires:
Nick Bennett (ENG)
Ilanggo Kanabathu (MAS)

17 January 2024
19:15

Japan	0–1	Ireland
	Report	Madeley 21'

Umpires:
Michiel Otten (NED)
Ben Göntgen (GER)

==== Pool B ====
Pos	Team	Pld	W	D	L	GF	GA	GD	Pts	Qualification
1	Spain (H)	3	2	1	0	14	4	+10	7	Semi-finals
2	South Korea	3	1	2	0	10	8	+2	5	Semi-finals
3	Austria	3	1	0	2	5	8	−3	3	Classification round
4	Egypt	3	0	1	2	5	14	−9	1	Classification round

Source: FIH
Rules for classification: 1) points; 2) matches won; 3) goal difference; 4) goals for; 5) head-to-head result; 6) field goals for.
(H) Hosts

13 January 2024
14:00

Spain	4–1	Austria
Miralles 18'; Basterra 22'; Cunill 30'; González 57'	Report	Winkler 18'

Umpires:
Ben Göntgen (GER)
Rawi Anbananthan (MAS)

13 January 2024
16:15

South Korea	4–4	Egypt
Jang 23'; Kim Ju. 37', 50'; Lee N. 58'	Report	El-Ganaini 42'; Mansour 48'; Ghobran 49'; El-Naggar 53'

Umpires:
Ilanggo Kanabathu (MAS)
Zeke Newman (AUS)

14 January 2024
14:00

South Korea	2–2	Spain
Lee J. 16'; Jang 43'	Report	Reyné 4'; Basterra 10'

Umpires:
Michiel Otten (NED)
David Tomlinson (NZL)

14 January 2024
16:15

Austria	2–0	Egypt
Losonci 38'; Winkler 60'	Report

Umpires:
Nick Bennett (ENG)
Tim Meissner (GER)

17 January 2024
12:00

Spain	8–1	Egypt
Miralles 10', 42'; Iglesias 21', 30'; González 23'; Reyné 27'; Basterra 23'; Recasens 51'	Report	El-Ganaini 42'

Umpires:
Tim Meissner (GER)
Rawi Anbananthan (MAS)

17 January 2024
14:15

Austria	2–4	South Korea
Soldat 44'; Scholz 51'	Report	Jang 6', 27'; Yang Ji. 56'; Hwang 60'

Umpires:
Zeke Newman (AUS)
David Tomlinson (NZL)

=== Classification round ===
Crossover
19 January
Japan	1
Egypt	5
19 January
Austria (pen.)	2 (3)
Ukraine	2 (2)

Fifth place
21 January
Egypt	4
Austria	3
Seventh place
21 January
Japan	6
Ukraine	2

==== Crossover ====
19 January 2024
10:00

Japan	1–5	Egypt
Nagayoshi 18'	Report	Esmat 9'; Mamdouh 27'; Mansour 38'; El-Ganaini 55'; Ragab 58'

Umpires:
Tim Meissner (GER)
David Tomlinson (NZL)

19 January 2024
18:00

Austria	2–2	Ukraine
Scholz 6'; Unterkircher 43'	Report	Kovalenko 5'; Boiko 23'
Penalties
Thornblöm (penalty shoot-out scored); Unterkircher (penalty shoot-out missed); Losonci (penalty shoot-out scored); Kaltenböck (penalty shoot-out scored); Winkler (penalty shoot-out missed)	3–2	(penalty shoot-out missed) Onofriiuk; (penalty shoot-out missed) Kovalenko; (penalty shoot-out scored) Shevchuk; (penalty shoot-out scored) Solomianyi; (penalty shoot-out missed) Koshelenko

Umpires:
Rawi Anbananthan (MAS)
Ilanggo Kanabathu (MAS)

==== Seventh and eighth place ====
21 January 2024
10:00

Japan	6–2	Ukraine
Nagayoshi 6', 34'; Yamasaki 9', 45'; Ooka 34'; Fujishima 58'	Report	Kovalenko 39'; Paziuk 53'

Umpires:
Nick Bennett (ENG)
Rawi Anbananthan (MAS)

==== Fifth and sixth place ====
21 January 2024
12:30

Egypt	4–3	Austria
Mamdouh 7', 60'; Nasr 38'; Ghobram 40'	Report	Losonci 5'; Lindengrun 35'; Scholz 59'

Umpires:
Tim Meissner (GER)
Ilanggo Kanabathu (MAS)

=== Medal round ===
Semi-finals
19 January
Belgium	4
South Korea	0
19 January
Spain	2
Ireland	0

Final
21 January
Belgium	3
Spain	2
Third place
21 January
South Korea	3
Ireland	4

==== Semi-finals ====
19 January 2024
12:30

Spain	2–0	Ireland
Vilallonga 35'; Miralles 39'	Report

Umpires:
Ben Göntgen (GER)
Nick Bennett (ENG)

19 January 2024
15:30

Belgium	4–0	South Korea
Cosyns 29'; Van Aubel 40'; Boon 52'; Denayer 56'	Report

Umpires:
Zeke Newman (AUS)
Michiel Otten (NED)

==== Third and fourth place ====
21 January 2024
15:30

Ireland	4–3	South Korea
Nelson 14'; Johnson 19'; McKee 24'; O'Donoghue 40'	Report	Kim S. 23'; Jeong 30'; Jang 40'

Umpires:
Michiel Otten (NED)
Ben Göntgen (GER)

==== Final ====
21 January 2024
18:00

Spain	2–3	Belgium
Gispert 38'; Cunill 58'	Report	Boon 21'; Van Aubel 58'; Onana 59'

Umpires:
Zeke Newman (AUS)
David Tomlinson (NZL)

=== Final standings ===
Pos	Team	Qualification
1	Belgium	2024 Summer Olympics
2	Spain (H)	2024 Summer Olympics
3	Ireland	2024 Summer Olympics
4	South Korea	
5	Egypt	
6	Austria	
7	Japan	
8	Ukraine	

Source: FIH
(H) Host

=== Goalscorers ===
There were 116 goals scored in 20 matches, for an average of 5.8 goals per match.

7 goals

- (Belgium) Tom Boon

5 goals

- (Belgium) Florent Van Aubel
- (South Korea) Jang Jong-hyun

4 goals

- (Japan) Ken Nagayoshi
- (Spain) Marc Miralles

3 goals

- (Austria) Maximilian Scholz
- (Belgium) Tanguy Cosyns
- (Belgium) William Ghislain
- (Belgium) Alexander Hendrickx
- (Belgium) Nelson Onana
- (Belgium) Thibeau Stockbroekx
- (Egypt) Ahmed El-Ganaini
- (Egypt) Mahmoud Mamdouh
- (Ireland) Ben Johnson
- (Japan) Koji Yamasaki
- (Spain) José Basterra
- (Ukraine) Viacheslav Paziuk

2 goals

- (Austria) Fülöp Losonci
- (Austria) Josef Winkler
- (Belgium) Félix Denayer
- (Egypt) Hossam Ghobran
- (Egypt) Mostafa Mansour
- (Ireland) Lee Cole
- (Ireland) Matthew Nelson
- (Japan) Kentaro Fukuda
- (South Korea) Kim Jung-hoo
- (Spain) Pepe Cunill
- (Spain) Enrique González
- (Spain) Álvaro Iglesias
- (Spain) Marc Reyné
- (Ukraine) Bohdan Kovalenko

1 goal

- (Austria) Franz Lindengrun
- (Austria) Christoph Soldat
- (Austria) Fabian Unterkircher
- (Belgium) Loïck Luypaert
- (Egypt) Ahmed El-Naggar
- (Egypt) Zeiad Esmat
- (Egypt) Mohamed Nasr
- (Egypt) Mohamed Ragab
- (Ireland) Jeremy Duncan
- (Ireland) Luke Madeley
- (Ireland) John McKee
- (Ireland) Shane O'Donoghue
- (Ireland) Daragh Walsh
- (Japan) Raiki Fujishima
- (Japan) Ryoma Ooka
- (Japan) Takuma Niwa
- (South Korea) Hwang Tae-il
- (South Korea) Jeong Jun-woo
- (South Korea) Kim Sung-hyun
- (South Korea) Lee Jung-jun
- (South Korea) Lee Nam-yong
- (South Korea) Yang Ji-hun
- (Spain) Xavier Gispert
- (Spain) Marc Recasens
- (Spain) Rafael Vilallonga
- (Ukraine) Oleksandr Boiko
- (Ukraine) Andrii Koshelenko

Source: FIH

== See also ==
- 2024 Women's FIH Hockey Olympic Qualifiers
