= Ben Johnson (field hockey) =

Irish field hockey player (born 2000)

Personal information
- Full name: Benjamin Johnson
- Born: 1 August 2000 (age 26) Waterford, Ireland

Sport
- Sport: Field hockey
- Position: Forward
Senior career
Years	Team	Caps	Goals
–	Three Rock Rovers	-	-
National team
Years	Team	Caps	Goals
2019	Ireland U–21	5	(2)
2022–	Ireland	21	(7)
Medal record
Men's field hockey
Representing Ireland
EuroHockey Championship II
Gold medal – first place	2023 Dublin	Team

Benjamin Johnson (born 1 August 2000) is a field hockey player from Ireland.

== Life ==
Johnson was born in Waterford, Ireland, on 1 August 2000.He attended Newtown school in Waterford, for both primary and secondary school. Having initially started playing hockey at age 2, he was mentored and coached by Peter Yatchuck.

== Field hockey ==
=== Domestic league ===
Johnson currently competes in the Irish Hockey League, where he represents the Three Rock Rovers.

=== Under–21 ===
He made his debut for the Irish U–21 team in 2019 at the EuroHockey Junior Championship II in Plzeň Litice.

=== Senior national team ===
Johnson made his senior international debut in 2022. He appeared in a test series against Italy in Hillsborough.

Since his debut, Johnson has been present at numerous international events. He has medalled once with the national team, taking home gold at the 2023 edition of the EuroHockey Championship II in Dublin.

He competed at the 2024 FIH Olympic Qualifiers in Valencia.
