= Takashi Yoshikawa =

Japanese field hockey player

Personal information
- Born: 29 November 1994 (age 31) Maibara, Japan
- Height: 1.82 m (6 ft 0 in)

Sport
- Sport: Field hockey
- Position: Goalkeeper
- Club: Gifu Asahi Club
National team
Years	Team	Caps	Goals
2014–present	Japan	107	(0)
Medal record
Men's field hockey
Representing Japan
Asian Games
Gold medal – first place	2018 Jakarta	Team
Silver medal – second place	2022 Hangzhou	Team
Asian Champions Trophy
Silver medal – second place	2021 Dhaka
Bronze medal – third place	2023 Chennai
- Updated on 24 December 2021

Takashi Yoshikawa (𠮷川 貴史, Yoshikawa Takashi, born 29 November 1994) is a Japanese field hockey player. He competed in the 2020 Summer Olympics.

He was a part of the Japan squad which won their first Asian Games gold medal in men's hockey in 2018.
