= Takuma Niwa =

Japanese field hockey player

Personal information
- Born: 27 April 2000 (age 26) Japan
- Height: 175 cm (5 ft 9 in)

Sport
- Sport: Field hockey
- Position: Midfield
National team
| Years | Team | Caps | Goals |
| 2019 | Japan U–21 | 6 | (1) |
| 2021– | Japan | 36 | (7) |
Medal record
Men's field hockey
Representing Japan
Asian Games
| Silver medal – second place | 2022 Hangzhou | Team |
Asian Champions Trophy
| Silver medal – second place | 2021 Dhaka | Team |
| Bronze medal – third place | 2023 Chennai | Team |

Takuma Niwa (丹羽 巧磨, born 27 April 2000) is a field hockey player from Japan, who plays as a midfielder.

== Career ==
=== Under–21 ===
In 2019, Niwa was a member of the Japan U–21 side at the Sultan of Johor Cup.

=== Senior national team ===
Niwa made his senior international debut in 2021.

Since his debut, Niwa has medalled at two Asian Champions Trophies. At the 2021 edition in Dhaka he won silver, followed by bronze at the 2023 edition in Chennai.

In 2023, Niwa was named to the national team for the FIH World Cup in Bhubaneswar and Rourkela, as well as the Asian Games in Hangzhou. At the Asian Games, he won a silver medal.
