= Jeremy Duncan =

Irish field hockey player

Personal information
- Born: 2 August 1994 (age 32) Kilkenny, Ireland

Sport
- Sport: Field hockey
- Position: Midfield
Senior career
Years	Team	Caps	Goals
–	Monkstown	-	-
National team
Years	Team	Caps	Goals
2014–	Ireland	100	(25)
2014	Ireland U–21	5	(2)
Medal record
Men's field hockey
Representing Ireland
EuroHockey Championship II
Gold medal – first place	2023 Dublin	Team

Jeremy Duncan (born 27 August 1994) is a field hockey player from Ireland who has played for the national field hockey team.

== Life ==
Duncan was born in Ireland, on 2 August 1994.

== Field hockey ==
=== Domestic league ===
Duncan currently competes in the Irish Hockey League, where he represents Monkstown.

=== Under–21 ===
He made his debut for the Irish U–21 team in 2014 at the EuroHockey Junior Championship II in Lousada.

=== Senior national team ===
Duncan made his senior international debut in 2014. He appeared in a test series against England in Reading.

Since his debut, Duncan has been present at numerous international events. He has medalled once with the national team, taking home gold at the 2023 edition of the EuroHockey Championship II.

He competed at the 2024 FIH Olympic Qualifiers in Valencia.
