= Pieter van Straaten =

French field hockey player

Personal information
- Full name: Pieter Georges van Straaten
- Born: 23 October 1992 (age 33) Leiderdorp, Netherlands
- Height: 160 cm (5 ft 3 in)
- Weight: 63 kg (139 lb)

Sport
- Sport: Field hockey
- Position: Forward
- Club: Antwerp
Youth career
- Team
- –: Alecto
Senior career
Years	Team	Caps	Goals
–	Alecto	-	-
–2018	HDM	-	-
2018–2020	Waterloo Ducks	-	-
2020–present	Antwerp	-	-
National team
Years	Team	Caps	Goals
2012–2013	France U–21	12	(2)
2012–present	France	97	(17)
Medal record
Men's field hockey
Representing France
Junior World Cup
Silver medal – second place	2013 New Delhi

Pieter Georges van Straaten (born 23 October 1992) is a French field hockey player who plays as a forward for Belgian Hockey League club Antwerp and the French national team.

== Career ==
=== Under–21 ===
Pieter van Straaten debuted for the France U–21 team in 2012 at the EuroHockey Junior Championship in 's-Hertogenbosch.

The following year he went on to represent the team at the FIH Junior World Cup in New Delhi. At the tournament he won a silver medal, a history making performance for the French team.

=== Senior national team ===
Van Straaten made his debut for the French national team in 2012.

In 2018, he represented his country at the FIH World Cup in Bhubaneswar.

Since his debut, Pieter van Straaten has been a regular fixture in the national squad. He won his first major medal with the senior team in 2019 at the FIH Series Finals in Le Touquet, taking home a gold medal.

He was a member of the national team at the 2021 EuroHockey Championships in Amsterdam, and was also named in the French squad for the 2021–22 FIH Pro League.
