= Matthew Nelson (field hockey) =

Irish field hockey player (born 1998)

Personal information
- Born: 14 April 1998 (age 28) Belfast, Northern Ireland

Sport
- Sport: Field hockey
- Position: Forward
Senior career
Years	Team	Caps	Goals
–	Lisnagarvey	-	-
National team
Years	Team	Caps	Goals
2016–	Ireland	71	(16)
Medal record
Men's field hockey
Representing Ireland
FIH Hockey Series
Silver medal – second place	2018–19 Le Touquet	Team

Matthew Nelson (born 14 April 1998) is a field hockey player from Ireland.

== Life ==
Nelson was born in Belfast, Northern Ireland, on 14 April 1998.

== Field hockey ==
=== Domestic league ===
Nelson currently competes in the Irish Hockey League, where he represents Lisnagarvey.

In 2023 Nelson moved to Australia to compete in the Hockey WA Premier League competition, where he represented Fremantle.

=== Senior national team ===
Nelson made his senior international debut in 2016. He appeared in a test series against Spain in Barcelona.

Since his debut, Nelson has been present at numerous international events and has medalled with the national team on one occasion. He took home silver at the 2018–19 FIH Series Finals in Le Touquet.

In 2018 he was a member of the Irish squad at the FIH World Cup held in Bhubaneswar.

He competed at the 2024 FIH Olympic Qualifiers in Valencia.
