= Floris van Son =

Canadian field hockey player

Personal information
- Full name: Floris Frederik van Son
- Born: May 14, 1992 (age 34) Apeldoorn, Netherlands
- Height: 1.81 m (5 ft 11 in)
- Weight: 80 kg (176 lb)

Sport
- Sport: Field hockey
- Position: Forward
- Club: Hurley
Senior career
Years	Team	Caps	Goals
–2019	HIC	-	-
2019–2021	AMVJ	-	-
2021–present	Hurley	-	-
National team
Years	Team	Caps	Goals
2016–present	Canada	47	(7)
Medal record
Men's field hockey
Representing Canada
Pan American Cup
Silver medal – second place	2017 Lancaster
Bronze medal – third place	2022 Santiago
- Updated on 24 July 2021

Floris Frederik van Son (born February 5, 1992) is a Canadian field hockey player who plays as a forward for Dutch Hoofdklasse club Hurley and the Canadian national team. Although born in the Netherlands, Van Son represents the country of birth of his father, Canada.

== Career ==
Van Son represented Canada at the 2017 Men's Pan American Cup, winning silver. In 2018, Van Son competed for Canada at the 2018 Commonwealth Games in the Gold Coast, Australia. The team finished in 8th. Later that year, Van Son was part of the 11th place Canadian team at the 2018 Men's Field hockey World Cup.

=== Olympics ===
Van Son was selected to represent Canada at the 2020 Summer Olympics.
