= 2014 Men's EuroHockey Junior Championship II =

2014 Men's EuroHockey Junior Championship
Tournament details
- Host country: Portugal
- City: Lousada
- Dates: 13–19 July
- Teams: 7 (from 1 confederation)

Final positions
- Champions: Ireland (2nd title)
- Runner-up: Portugal
- Third place: Scotland

Tournament statistics
- Matches played: 15
- Goals scored: 87 (5.8 per match)
- Top scorer(s): (Ireland) Nick Burns (7 goals)

The 2014 Men's EuroHockey Junior Championship II was the ninth edition of the Men's EuroHockey Junior Championship II, the second level of the men's European under-21 field hockey championships organized by the European Hockey Federation. It was held from 13 to 19 July 2014 in Lousada, Portugal.

Ireland won their second EuroHockey Junior Championship II title and were promoted to the 2017 Men's EuroHockey Junior Championship together with the hosts and runners-up Portugal.

== Results ==
=== Preliminary round ===
==== Pool A ====
Pos	Team	Pld	W	D	L	GF	GA	GD	Pts	Qualification
1	Scotland	2	1	1	0	5	3	+2	4	Promotion pool
2	Italy	2	0	2	0	4	4	0	2	Promotion pool
3	Belarus	2	0	1	1	3	5	−2	1	Relegation pool

Source: FIH

14 July 2014
19:00

Scotland	3–1	Belarus
	Report

15 July 2014
10:00

Italy	2–2	Belarus
	Report

16 July 2014
10:00

Scotland	2–2	Italy
	Report

==== Pool B ====
Pos	Team	Pld	W	D	L	GF	GA	GD	Pts	Qualification
1	Ireland	3	2	1	0	12	4	+8	7	Promotion pool
2	Portugal (H)	3	1	2	0	9	6	+3	5	Promotion pool
3	Russia	3	1	1	1	12	10	+2	4	Relegation pool
4	Ukraine	3	0	0	3	5	18	−13	0	Relegation pool

Source: FIH
(H) Hosts

13 July 2014
19:00

Ukraine	2–5	Portugal
	Report

14 July 2014
17:00

Russia	2–5	Ireland
	Report

15 July 2014
17:00

Ukraine	1–6	Ireland
	Report

15 July 2014
19:00

Russia	3–3	Portugal
	Report

16 July 2014
17:00

Russia	7–2	Ukraine
	Report

16 July 2014
19:00

Portugal	1–1	Ireland
	Report

=== Second round ===
The points obtained in the preliminary round against the other team are taken over.

==== Pool C ====
Pos	Team	Pld	W	D	L	GF	GA	GD	Pts	Relegation
5	Russia	2	2	0	0	15	4	+11	6	
6	Ukraine	2	1	0	1	7	10	−3	3	
7	Belarus	2	0	0	2	5	13	−8	0	EuroHockey Junior Championship III

Source: FIH

18 July 2014
09:00

Belarus	3–5	Ukraine
	Report

19 July 2014
10:00

Belarus	2–8	Russia
	Report

==== Pool D ====
Pos	Team	Pld	W	D	L	GF	GA	GD	Pts	Promotion
1	Ireland	3	2	1	0	13	4	+9	7	EuroHockey Junior Championship
2	Portugal (H)	3	2	1	0	4	2	+2	7	EuroHockey Junior Championship
3	Scotland	3	0	1	2	3	6	−3	1	
4	Italy	3	0	1	2	5	13	−8	1	

Source: FIH
(H) Hosts

18 July 2014
14:00

Italy	2–9	Ireland
	Report

18 July 2014
18:00

Scotland	0–1	Portugal
	Report

19 July 2014
12:00

Italy	1–2	Portugal
	Report

19 July 2014
15:00

Scotland	1–3	Ireland
	Report

== Final standings ==
Pos	Team	Promotion or relegation
1	Ireland	Promotion to the EuroHockey Junior Championship
2	Portugal (H)	Promotion to the EuroHockey Junior Championship
3	Scotland	
4	Italy	
5	Russia	
6	Ukraine	
7	Belarus	Relegation to the EuroHockey Junior Championship III

Source: EHF
(H) Host

== See also ==
- 2014 Men's EuroHockey Junior Championship
- 2014 Men's EuroHockey Junior Championship III
- 2014 Women's EuroHockey Junior Championship II
