= Ireland men's national field hockey team =

Ireland
- Nickname(s): The Green Machine
- Association: Hockey Ireland
- Confederation: EHF (Europe)
- Head Coach: Mark Tumilty
- Assistant coach(es): David Fitzgerald; Neville Rothman; Patrick Tshutshani
- Manager: Christine O'Shea
- Captain: Kyle Marshall
- Top scorer: Shane O'Donoghue
Home	Away

FIH ranking
- Current: 11 (6 November 2026)
- Highest: 9 (April 2017, August 2024, March 2026)
- Lowest: 16 (2011)

Olympic Games
- Appearances: 3 (first in 1908)
- Best result: (silver) 2nd (1908)

World Cup
- Appearances: 4 (first in 1978)
- Best result: 12th (1978, 1990)

EuroHockey Championship
- Appearances: 15 (first in 1970)
- Best result: (bronze) 3rd (2015)
Medal record
Olympic Games
Silver medal – second place	1908 London	Team
EuroHockey Championship
Bronze medal – third place	2015 London
Champions Challenge
Bronze medal – third place	2012 Quilmes

The Ireland men's national field hockey team is organised by Hockey Ireland and represents both the Republic of Ireland and Northern Ireland in international men's field hockey competitions, including the Men's Hockey World Cup and the EuroHockey Nations Championship. They have previously competed in the Men's Intercontinental Cup, the Hockey Champions Challenge, the Men's FIH Hockey World League and the FIH Hockey Series. The team also competes at the Summer Olympics. On 26 January 1895 Ireland played in the first ever international field hockey match when they defeated Wales 3–0 in Rhyl. Ireland were finalists and silver medallists at the 1908 Summer Olympics. Ireland were also bronze medallists at the 2015 Men's EuroHockey Nations Championship.

== Early years ==
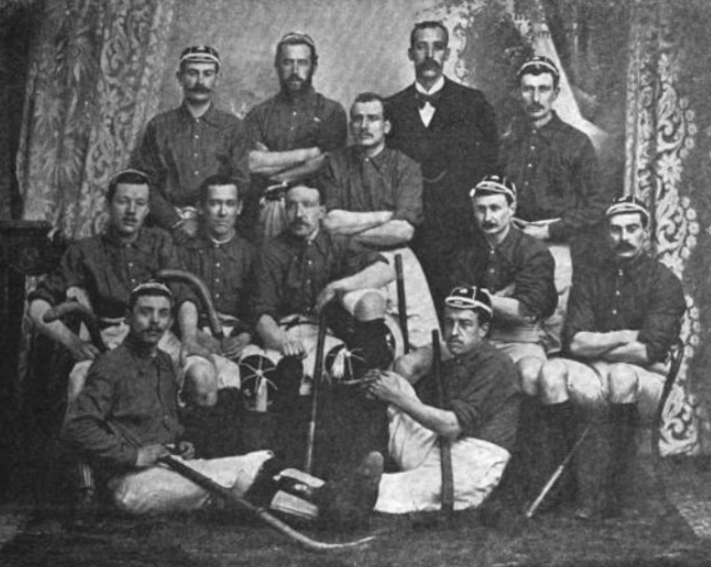
1895

The Irish Hockey Union was founded on 6 February 1893 and on 26 January 1895 Ireland played in the first ever international field hockey match when they defeated Wales 3–0 in Rhyl. In 1895 Ireland also played England for the first time. This was also England's first ever international field hockey match. England's first four international matches, in 1895, 1896, 1897 and 1898, were all against Ireland. By the start of the First World War, Ireland had played 55 international matches, mostly against Wales, England or Scotland. This saw 605 individuals represent Ireland, at least 164 of whom were brothers. Amongst the most notable set of brothers were the Petersons, including Jack and Walter. In 1904 the Peterson brothers were members of the Ireland team that won the Triple Crown. Ireland won the title after defeating Wales 4–2 away and England 3–2 at home. As well as Jack and Walter, the team also included their brothers Nicholas, William and Cecil. Another brother, Herbert made two Ireland appearances between 1900 and 1902. In total the brothers won 66 caps between them.

== Tournament history ==
=== Olympic Games ===
In 1908, with a team that included Jack and Walter Peterson, Ireland played in the very first Olympic field hockey tournament. After defeating Wales 3–1 in the semi-final, they lost 8–1 to England in the final. The Ireland team was part of the Great Britain at the 1908 Summer Olympics team. Because of this, the silver medal won by Ireland is credited to Great Britain and not Ireland. Ireland would have to wait 108 years before competing in their next Olympic tournament. In 1980 Ireland were invited to enter the tournament after a number of teams dropped out following the boycott. However the offer was turned down by the Irish Hockey Union due to the short notice. Shortly after it was proposed that Ireland apply to enter in 1984. However following a meeting on 16 May 1980 it was rejected due to opposition from the Ulster Branch. Ireland have entered Olympic qualifying tournaments since 1992. After narrowly missing out on qualification in both 2008 and 2012, Ireland qualified for the 2016 Summer Olympics after finishing fifth in the 2014–15 Men's FIH Hockey World League Semifinals. Australia's 3–2 victory over New Zealand in the 2015 Oceania Cup confirmed Ireland's qualification.

Tournaments	Place
1908 Summer Olympics	2nd place, silver medalist(s)
2016 Summer Olympics	10th
2024 Summer Olympics	10th

Olympic Qualifiers	Place
2008 Men's Field Hockey Olympic Qualifier	4th
2012 Men's Field Hockey Olympic Qualifier	2nd place, silver medalist(s)
2016 Summer Olympics	10th
2019 Men's FIH Olympic Qualifiers	—N/a
2024 Men's FIH Hockey Olympic Qualifiers	3rd place, bronze medalist(s)

=== World Cup ===
Ireland qualified for the 1978 Men's Hockey World Cup after finishing as runners-up at the 1977 Men's Intercontinental Cup. The Ireland squad at their first World Cup included Terry Gregg, David Judge and Tommy Allen. Ireland qualified for the 1990 Men's Hockey World Cup after finishing fifth at the 1989 Men's Intercontinental Cup. The 1990 World Cup squad included Jimmy Kirkwood, Stephen Martin, Billy McConnell and Martin Sloan. Ireland qualified for the 2018 Men's Hockey World Cup after finishing fifth in the 2016–17 Men's FIH Hockey World League Semifinals.

Tournaments	Place
1978 Men's Hockey World Cup	12th
1990 Men's Hockey World Cup	12th
2018 Men's Hockey World Cup	14th
2026 Men's Hockey World Cup	10th

World Cup Qualifiers	Place	Notes
1997 Men's Intercontinental Cup (field hockey)	12th	DNQ
2006 Men's Intercontinental Cup (field hockey)	8th	DNQ
2009 Men's Hockey World Cup Qualifiers	3rd place, bronze medalist(s)	DNQ
2012–13 Men's FIH Hockey World League Semifinals	7th	DNQ
2016–17 Men's FIH Hockey World League Semifinals	5th	Qualified
2023 Men's FIH Hockey World Cup – European Qualifier	4th	DNQ
2026 Men's FIH Hockey World Cup Qualifiers	1st place, gold medalist(s)	Qualified

=== EuroHockey Championship ===
Ireland have played regularly in the EuroHockey Nations Championship. With a team that included Harry Cahill and David Judge, Ireland competed in the inaugural 1970 tournament. Ireland hosted the 1995 tournament. After finishing ninth in 2003, Ireland were relegated to the 2005 Men's EuroHockey Nations Trophy. After winning this tournament, Ireland were promoted to the 2007 Men's EuroHockey Nations Championship. After finishing seventh in 2007 Ireland were again relegated. However after winning the 2009 Men's EuroHockey Nations Trophy, they were promoted to the 2011 Men's EuroHockey Nations Championship. Ireland's best performance in the tournament came in 2015 when they won the bronze medal after beating the hosts, England, 4–2 in the third place play-off with goals from Shane O'Donoghue, Alan Sothern and Eugene Magee.

Tournaments	Place
1970 Men's EuroHockey Nations Championship	9th
1974 Men's EuroHockey Nations Championship	11th
1978 Men's EuroHockey Nations Championship	8th
1983 Men's EuroHockey Nations Championship	10th
1987 Men's EuroHockey Nations Championship	6th
1991 Men's EuroHockey Nations Championship	7th
1995 Men's EuroHockey Nations Championship	5th
1999 Men's EuroHockey Nations Championship	11th
2003 Men's EuroHockey Nations Championship	9th
2005 Men's EuroHockey Nations Trophy	1st place, gold medalist(s)
2007 Men's EuroHockey Nations Championship	7th
2009 Men's EuroHockey Nations Trophy	1st place, gold medalist(s)
2011 Men's EuroHockey Nations Championship	5th
2013 Men's EuroHockey Nations Championship	6th
2015 Men's EuroHockey Nations Championship	3rd place, bronze medalist(s)
2017 Men's EuroHockey Nations Championship	6th
2019 Men's EuroHockey Nations Championship	8th
2021 Men's EuroHockey Championship II	3rd place, bronze medalist(s)
2023 Men's EuroHockey Championship II	1st place, gold medalist(s)
2025 Men's EuroHockey Championship II	2nd place, silver medalist(s)

EuroHockey Championship Qualifiers	Place	Notes
2003 Men's EuroHockey Nations Championship qualification	1st place, gold medalist(s)	Qualified for 2003 Men's EuroHockey Nations Championship
2025 Men's EuroHockey Championship Qualifiers	2nd place, silver medalist(s)	Qualified for 2023 Men's EuroHockey Championship II
2025 Men's EuroHockey Championship Qualifiers	3rd place, bronze medalist(s)	Qualified for 2025 Men's EuroHockey Championship II

=== Men's Intercontinental Cup ===
Between 1977 and 2006 Ireland played regularly in the Men's Intercontinental Cup. Ireland qualified for the 1978 Men's Hockey World Cup after finishing as runners-up at the 1977 Men's Intercontinental Cup. With a team that included Jimmy Kirkwood, Stephen Martin, Billy McConnell and Martin Sloan, Ireland qualified for the 1990 Men's Hockey World Cup after finishing fifth at the 1989 Men's Intercontinental Cup. After finishing ninth in the 1993 Men's Intercontinental Cup, Ireland were relegated to the 1996 Inter Nations Cup. After finishing fourth in this tournament they qualified for the 1997 Men's Intercontinental Cup.

Tournaments	Place
1977 Men's Intercontinental Cup	(silver)
1981 Men's Intercontinental Cup	4th
1985 Men's Intercontinental Cup	6th
1989 Men's Intercontinental Cup	5th
1993 Men's Intercontinental Cup	9th
1996 Inter Nations Cup	4th
1997 Men's Intercontinental Cup	12th
2006 Men's Intercontinental Cup	8th

=== Hockey Champions Challenge ===
Between 2009 and 2014 Ireland competed in the Hockey Champions Challenge. They initially played in the second level tournament. However after winning the 2011 Men's Hockey Champions Challenge II they were promoted to the 2012 Men's Hockey Champions Challenge I.

==== Hockey Champions Challenge I ====
Tournaments	Place
2012 Men's Hockey Champions Challenge I	3rd place, bronze medalist(s)
2014 Men's Hockey Champions Challenge I	4th

==== Hockey Champions Challenge II ====
Tournaments	Place
2009 Men's Hockey Champions Challenge II	2nd place, silver medalist(s)
2011 Men's Hockey Champions Challenge II	1st place, gold medalist(s)

=== Men's FIH Hockey World League ===
Between 2012 and 2017 Ireland played in the Men's FIH Hockey World League. Ireland won World League tournaments in 2012, 2015 and 2017. Ireland qualified for the 2016 Summer Olympics after finishing fifth in the 2014–15 Men's FIH Hockey World League Semifinals. Ireland also qualified for the 2018 Men's Hockey World Cup after finishing fifth in the 2016–17 Men's FIH Hockey World League Semifinals.

Tournaments	Place
2012–13 Men's FIH Hockey World League	14th
→ 2012–13 Men's FIH Hockey World League Round 1	1st place, gold medalist(s)
→ 2012–13 Men's FIH Hockey World League Round 2	2nd place, silver medalist(s)
→ 2012–13 Men's FIH Hockey World League Semifinals	7th
2014–15 Men's FIH Hockey World League	9th
→ 2014–15 Men's FIH Hockey World League Round 2	1st
→ 2014–15 Men's FIH Hockey World League Semifinals	5th
2016–17 Men's FIH Hockey World League	11th
→ 2016–17 Men's FIH Hockey World League Round 2	1st place, gold medalist(s)
→ 2016–17 Men's FIH Hockey World League Semifinals	5th

=== FIH Hockey Series ===
During 2019, Ireland played in the FIH Hockey Series.

Tournaments	Place
2018–19 Men's FIH Series Finals	2nd place, silver medalist(s)

=== FIH Hockey Nations Cup ===
Tournaments	Place
2022	2nd place, silver medalist(s)
2025–26	7th
2026–27	Qualified

=== FIH Pro League ===
Tournaments	Place
2023–24 Men's FIH Pro League	9th
2024–25 Men's FIH Pro League	9th

=== Invitational tournaments ===
Tournament	Place
2014 Men's Hockey Investec Cup	2nd place, silver medalist(s)
2017 Hamburg Masters	1st place, gold medalist(s)
2018 Sultan Azlan Shah Cup	6th
2018 Men's Four Nations Cup	4th

== Results and fixtures ==
The following is a list of match results in the last 12 months, as well as any future matches that have been scheduled.

Win Draw Loss Fixture

=== 2026 ===
==== 2026 FIH World Cup Qualifiers ====
01 March 2026 GS	Ireland	5–2	Canada	Santiago, Chile
12:00	McAllister 9'; Lynch 22'; Duncan 40'; Cole 49', 52'	Report	Childs 47'; Nicholson 50'	Stadium: Estadio Nacional del Hockey Césped Claudia Schüler

03 March 2026 GS	South Korea	1–6	Ireland	Santiago, Chile
11:15	Jang 15'	Report	Williams 14'; Cole 27', 56'; Nelson 28'; Rowe 42', 48'	Stadium: Estadio Nacional del Hockey Césped Claudia Schüler

04 March 2026 GS	Ireland	4–1	Poland	Santiago, Chile
09:00	Rowe 15'; Cole 21'; Walker 40'; Nelson 59'	Report	Rutkowski 52'	Stadium: Estadio Nacional del Hockey Césped Claudia Schüler

06 March 2026 SF	Ireland	4–0	Wales	Santiago, Chile
19:30	Lynch 1', 44'; Rowe 26'; Nelson 44'	Report		Stadium: Estadio Nacional del Hockey Césped Claudia Schüler

08 March 2026 Final	France	1–2	Ireland	Santiago, Chile
15:45	Haertelmeyer 24'	Report	Williams 26', 36'	Stadium: Estadio Nacional del Hockey Césped Claudia Schüler

==== 2026 FIH Nations Cup ====
11 June 2026 Pool B	Ireland	3–0	United States	Cape Town, South Africa
16:45	Johnson 17'; Williams 28'; Gibson 48'	Report		Stadium: Hartleyvale Stadium

13 June 2026 Pool B	Ireland	0–2	France	Cape Town, South Africa
14:45		Report	Esmenjaud 25'; Clément 35'	Stadium: Hartleyvale Stadium

16 June 2026 Pool B	South Africa	3–3	Ireland	Cape Town, South Africa
19:00	Melville 24'; Mentoor 35'; Davis 57'	Report	Walsh 4'; Nelson 48', 60'	Stadium: Hartleyvale Stadium

19 June 2026 5/8 Classification	Ireland	4–4 (7–8 p)	Scotland	Cape Town, South Africa
14:30	Nelson 40', 55'; Hyland 57'; Duncan 59'	Report	Tweedie 28'; J. Golden 35', 43', 60'	Stadium: Hartleyvale Stadium
	Penalties
	Walsh (penalty shoot-out missed); G. Williams (penalty shoot-out scored); Nelson (penalty shoot-out scored); B. Walker (penalty shoot-out missed); Marshall (penalty shoot-out missed); G. Williams (penalty shoot-out scored); Nelson (penalty shoot-out scored); Walsh (penalty shoot-out missed); B. Walker (penalty shoot-out scored); Marshall (penalty shoot-out scored); G. Williams (penalty shoot-out scored); Nelson (penalty shoot-out missed)		(penalty shoot-out missed) S. Walker; (penalty shoot-out missed) Austin; (penalty shoot-out scored) J. Golden; (penalty shoot-out missed) C. Golden; (penalty shoot-out scored) Field; (penalty shoot-out scored) Austin; (penalty shoot-out scored) S. Walker; (penalty shoot-out missed) C. Golden; (penalty shoot-out scored) J. Golden; (penalty shoot-out scored) Field; (penalty shoot-out scored) Austin; (penalty shoot-out scored) S. Walker

20 June 2026 7/8 Classification	United States	1–5	Ireland	Cape Town, South Africa
12:15	Charasika 29'	Report	B. Nelson 12', 28'; Empey 20'; G. Williams 44'; M. Nelson 58'	Stadium: Hartleyvale Stadium

==== 2026 FIH World Cup ====
16 August 2026 Pool C	Australia	3–1	Ireland	Wavre, Belgium
11:30	Rintala 7', 23'; Govers 27'	Report	Empey 54'	Stadium: Belfius Hockey Arena

18 August 2026 Pool C	Ireland	4–1	South Africa	Wavre, Belgium
17:00	Walker 43'; Cole 49', 56'; Hyland 60'	Report	Melville 38'	Stadium: Belfius Hockey Arena

20 August 2026 Pool C	Ireland	1–3	Spain	Wavre, Belgium
17:00	Cole 19'	Report	Álvarez 9'; Reyné 47', 53'	Stadium: Belfius Hockey Arena

21 August 2026 Pool H	Ireland	7–4	Malaysia	Wavre, Belgium
14:00	Lynch 8', 12', 24'; Nelson 19', 39'; McKee 37'; Walker 54'	Report	Kamaruddin 29'; Azahar 36'; Azrai 41'; Saari 55'	Stadium: Belfius Hockey Arena

23 August 2026 Pool H	France	2–1	Ireland	Wavre, Belgium
14:30	Charlet 42'; Clément 59'	Report	Duncan 39'	Stadium: Belfius Hockey Arena

28 August 2026 9th place match	New Zealand	6–3	Ireland	Wavre, Belgium
14:00	Russell 3', 14'; Baker 21'; Lane 26', 46'; Ward 58'	Report	Williams 37'; Cole 38'; Duncan 60'	Stadium: Belfius Hockey Arena

== Team ==
=== Current squad ===
Roster for the 2026 Men's FIH Hockey World Cup .

Head coach: Mark Tumilty

1. Jamie Carr (GK)
2. Luke Roleston (GK)
4. Luke Witherow
8. Jonathan McKee
9. Matthew Nelson
15. Kyle Marshall (C)
17. Sean Murray
18. Mark McNellis
19. Peter McKibbin
20. Jeremy Duncan
24. Benjamin Walker
25. Jonathan Lynch
26. Peter Brown
29. Lee Cole
30. Louis Rowe
36. Samuel Hyland
39. Fergus Gibson
46. Gregory Williams
47. Adam McCallister
49. Alistair Empey

=== Olympians ===
London 1908

- Edward Allman-Smith
- Henry Brown
- Walter Campbell
- William Graham
- Richard Gregg
- Edward Holmes
- Robert Kennedy
- Henry Murphy
- Jack Peterson
- Walter Peterson
- Charles Power
- Frank Robinson

Rio 2016

- Jonathan Bell
- Chris Cargo
- Peter Caruth
- Michael Darling
- Paul Gleghorne
- Kyle Good
- Ronan Gormley
- Conor Harte
- David Harte
- John Jackson
- John Jermyn
- Eugene Magee
- Shane O'Donoghue
- Kirk Shimmins
- Alan Sothern
- Michael Watt

==== 2024 Summer Olympics ====
- David Harte
- Jaime Carr
- Shane O'Donoghue
- Kyle Marshall
- Lee Cole
- Michael Robson
- Nick Page
- Peter Brown
- Peter McKibbin
- Johnny McKee
- Tim Cross
- Daragh Walsh
- Sean Murray
- Ali Empey
- Johnny Lynch
- Jeremy Duncan
- Matthew Nelson
- Ben Walker
- Ben Johnson

Great Britain

The following Ireland internationals have also represented Great Britain at the Summer Olympics.

- Steven Johnson – 1956
- Harry Cahill – 1960, 1964, 1968
- David Judge – 1964
- Terry Gregg – 1972
- Stephen Martin – 1984, 1988, 1992
- Billy McConnell – 1984
- Jimmy Kirkwood – 1988
- Iain Lewers – 2012, 2016
- David Ames – 2016
- Mark Gleghorne – 2016
- Ian Sloan – 2016

=== Coaches ===
Years	
c.1981	(Ireland) Joey O'Meara
c.1989–1990	(Netherlands) Cees Kopelaar
2005–2008	(England) David Passmore
2008–2012	(South Africa) Paul Revington
2012–2013	(Australia) Andrew Meredith
2014–2018	(South Africa) Craig Fulton
2018–2019	(Netherlands) Alexander Cox
2019–present	(Ireland) Mark Tumilty

== Honours ==
=== Major Tournaments ===
- Summer Olympics
  - Runners Up: 1908:
- FIH Nations Cup
  - Runners Up: 2022:
- Men's FIH Series Finals
  - Runners up: 2019:

=== Others ===
- Men's EuroHockey Championship II
  - Winners: 2005, 2009, 2023
- Hamburg Masters
  - Winners: 2017
- Men's FIH Hockey World League Round 1
  - Winners: 2012 Cardiff
- Men's FIH Hockey World League Round 2
  - Winners: 2015 San Diego, 2017 Belfast
  - Runners up: 2013 New Delhi
- Men's Hockey Champions Challenge II
  - Winners: 2011
  - Runners up: 2009
- Men's Field Hockey Olympic Qualifier
  - Runners up: 2012
- Men's Hockey Investec Cup
  - Runners up: 2014
- Men's Intercontinental Cup
  - Runners Up: 1977
