= Japan men's national field hockey team =

Japan
- Nickname(s): Samurai Japan
- Association: Japan Hockey Association
- Confederation: AHF (Asia)
- Head Coach: Yoshihiro Anai
- Assistant coach(es): Yosuke Matsumura
- Manager: Ippel Fujimoto
- Captain: Raiki Fujishima
Home	Away

FIH ranking
- Current: 15 ▲2 (6 November 2026)

Olympic Games
- Appearances: 6 (first in 1932)
- Best result: (silver) 2nd (1932)

World Cup
- Appearances: 6 (first in 1971)
- Best result: 9th (1971, 2006)

Asian Games
- Appearances: 18 (first in 1958)
- Best result: (gold) 1st (2018)

Asia Cup
- Appearances: 11 (first in 1985)
- Best result: 4th (1985, 1989, 2003, 2007, 2022)
Medal record
Event	1st	2nd	3rd
Olympic Games	0	1	0
Asian Games	1	1	2
Asian Champions Trophy	0	3	1
Total	1	5	3
Olympic Games
Silver medal – second place	1932 Los Angeles	Team
Asian Games
Gold medal – first place	2018 Jakarta	Team
Silver medal – second place	2022 Hangzhou	Team
Bronze medal – third place	1966 Bangkok	Team
Bronze medal – third place	1970 Bangkok	Team
Asian Champions Trophy
Silver medal – second place	2013 Kakamigahara	
Silver medal – second place	2021 Dhaka	
Silver medal – second place	2026 Punjab	
Bronze medal – third place	2023 Chennai	

The Japan men's national field hockey team represents Japan in men's international field hockey and is operated by the Japan Hockey Association. As of September 2026, they are ranked 17th in the world.

The team participated in the first World Cup in 1971, where they finished 9th. The team then coached by Dutchman Siegfried Aikman, won their first international tournament by claiming the gold medal in the final against Malaysia at the 2018 Asian Games.

== Tournament history ==
=== Summer Olympics ===
- 1932 – (silver)
- 1936 – 7th place
- 1956 – Withdrew
- 1960 – 14th place
- 1964 – 7th place
- 1968 – 13th place
- 2020 – 11th place

=== World Cup ===
- 1971 – 9th place
- 1973 – 10th place
- 2002 – 12th place
- 2006 – 9th place
- 2023 – 15th place
- 2026 – 14th place

=== Asian Games ===
- 1958 – 5th place
- 1962 – 4th place
- 1966 – (bronze)
- 1970 – (bronze)
- 1974 – 4th place
- 1978 – 4th place
- 1982 – 4th place
- 1986 – 5th place
- 1990 – 6th place
- 1994 – 4th place
- 1998 – 4th place
- 2002 – 6th place
- 2006 – 4th place
- 2010 – 6th place
- 2014 – 6th place
- 2018 – (gold)
- 2022 – (silver)
- 2026 – 5th place

=== Asia Cup ===
- 1985 – 4th place
- 1989 – 4th place
- 1994 – 9th place
- 1999 – 5th place
- 2003 – 4th place
- 2007 – 4th place
- 2009 – 6th place
- 2013 – 5th place
- 2017 – 5th place
- 2022 – 4th place
- 2025 – 5th place

=== Asian Champions Trophy ===
Asian Champions Trophy record
Year	Host	Position	Pld	W	D	L	GF	GA
2011	Ordos, China	4th	6	2	1	3	11	10
2012	Doha, Qatar	6th	6	1	0	5	14	19
2013	Kakamigahara, Japan	2nd	6	3	1	2	11	9
2016	Kuantan, Malaysia	6th	6	0	0	6	14	31
2018	Muscat, Oman	4th	7	2	2	3	12	18
2021	Dhaka, Bangladesh	2nd	6	2	3	1	16	15
2023	Chennai, India	3rd	7	2	2	3	13	18
2024	Hulunbuir, China	5th	6	0	2	4	15	23
2026	Punjab, India	2nd	7	3	2	2	10	13
Total		2nd place	57	15	13	29	116	156

=== FIH Hockey Nations Cup ===
FIH Hockey Nations Cup record
Year	Host	Position	Pld	W	D	L	GF	GA
2022	Potchefstroom, South Africa	6th	5	2	1	2	10	11
2023–24	Gniezno, Poland	did not qualify						
2024–25	Kuala Lumpur, Malaysia	7th	5	1	0	4	10	14
2025–26	Cape Town, South Africa	4th	6	2	1	3	12	14
2026–27	Lahore, Pakistan	Qualified						
Total		4th place	16	5	2	9	32	49

=== Sultan Azlan Shah Cup ===
- 1987 – 6th place
- 2016 – 7th place
- 2017 – 6th place
- 2019 – 5th place
- 2020 – Cancelled
- 2022 – 4th place
- 2024 – (gold)

=== Hockey World League ===
- 2012–13 – 12th place
- 2014–15 – 16th place
- 2016–17 – 20th place

=== Champions Challenge ===
- 2001 – 5th place
- 2007 – 5th place
- 2011 – 7th place
- 2012 – 5th place
- 2014 – 7th place

== Current squad ==
The following is the Japan roster in the men's field hockey tournament of the 2026 Asian Games.

Head coach: (Japan) Yoshihiro Anai

1. Koji Yamasaki
2. Shota Yamada
4. Yamato Kawahara
5. Seren Tanaka
6. Naru Kimura
7. Jun Watanabe
8. Taiki Takade
9. Kosei Kawabe
11. Kazumasa Matsumoto
12. Yuma Nagai
13. Manabu Yamashita
14. Raiki Fujishima (C)
16. Hiro Saito
18. Tsubasa Tanaka
19. Ryoma Ooka
22. Kaito Tanaka
23. Yusuke Kawamura
29. Takumi Kitagawa (GK)
30. Takashi Yoshikawa (GK)
38. Hyota Yamada

== Results and fixtures ==
The following is a list of match results in the last 12 months, as well as any future matches that have been scheduled.

Win Draw Loss Fixture

=== 2026 ===
==== Summer Series ====
30 January 2026 Test 1	New Zealand	2–5	Japan	Hamilton, New Zealand
18:30	Woods 45'; Hiha 56'	Report	H. Yamada 18', 48', 57'; Yamasaki 35'; Kawabe 54'	Stadium: Gallagher Hockey Centre

1 February 2026 Test 2	New Zealand	5–1	Japan	Hamilton, New Zealand
16:30	Russell 8', 37'; Thomas 23', 35'; Lane 27'	Report	Shinohara 30'	Stadium: Gallagher Hockey Centre

2 February 2026 Test 3	New Zealand	4–3	Japan	Hamilton, New Zealand
18:30	Lane 19', 42'; Woods 29'; Russell 50'	Report	Matsumoto 14', 45'; Yamasaki 33'	Stadium: Gallagher Hockey Centre

4 January 2026 Test 4	New Zealand	3–3	Japan	Hamilton), New Zealand
10:00	Russell 12', 29'; Thomas 48'	Report	H. Yamada 21'; Yamasaki 25', 60'	Stadium: Gallagher Hockey Centre

==== 2026 Men's FIH Hockey World Cup Qualifiers ====
1 March 2026 Pool A	England	5–0	Japan	Ismailia, Egypt
18:45	Sorsby 11', 36'; Ward 13'; Croft 17', 44'	Report		Stadium: Suez Canal Stadium

2 March 2026 Pool A	Japan	4–0	United States	Ismailia, Egypt
18:45	Matsumoto 3'; Yamasaki 23'; Ooka 28'; Kimura 56'	Report		Stadium: Suez Canal Stadium

4 March 2026 Pool A	Japan	6–3	Egypt	Ismailia, Egypt
20:45	Fujishima 7', 52', 59'; Shinohara 9'; Matsumoto 11', 40'	Report	El-Ganaini 22', 33', 34'	Stadium: Suez Canal Stadium

6 March 2026 Semi-final	Pakistan	4–3	Japan	Ismailia, Egypt
15:30	Ammad 9'; Mahmood 52'; Khan 55'; Afraz 57'	Report	Ooka 21'; Yamada 35'; Yamasaki 41'	Stadium: Suez Canal Stadium

7 March 2026 3/4 Classification	Malaysia	4–5	Japan	Ismailia, Egypt
15:00	Saari 30'; Jalil 32'; Cholan 36'; F.Saari 59'	Report	Ooka 15'; Matsumoto 38'; Fujishima 52'; Yamasaki 55', 57'	Stadium: Suez Canal Stadium

==== Test matches ====
11 April 2026 Test 1	Japan	1–2	South Korea	Tokyo, Japan
13:00	Kawabe 3'	Report	Yang 57'; Son 58'	Stadium: Oi Hockey Stadium

12 April 2026 Test 2	Japan	2–3	South Korea	Tokyo, Japan
15:30	Kimura 5'; Matsumoto 32'	Report	Son 11'; Bae 48'; Kim 57'	Stadium: Oi Hockey Stadium

==== 2026 FIH Nations Cup ====
11 June 2026 Pool A	South Korea	1–1	Japan	Cape Town, South Africa
14:30	Lim 27'	Report	T. Tanaka 37'	Stadium: Hartleyvale Stadium

12 June 2026 Pool A	Malaysia	1–4	Japan	Cape Town, South Africa
16:45	Saari 4'	Report	H. Yamada 26'; Matsumoto 29'; Tanaka 50'; Fujishima 55'	Stadium: Hartleyvale Stadium

14 June 2026 Pool A	Japan	1–0	Scotland	Cape Town, South Africa
14:45	Yamasaki 43'	Report		Stadium: Hartleyvale Stadium

17 June 2026 Pool A	New Zealand	5–2	Japan	Cape Town, South Africa
19:00	Russell 13', 28'; Boyde 29', 56'; Lane 31'	Report	Watanabe 45'; Matsumoto 46'	Stadium: Hartleyvale Stadium

19 June 2026 Semi finals	France	4–3	Japan	Cape Town, South Africa
19:00	Charlet 7'; Esmenjaud 11'; Clément 28'; Sellier 53'	Report	Ooka 5'; S. Yamada 8'; H. Yamada 22'	Stadium: Hartleyvale Stadium

20 June 2026 3/4 classification	New Zealand	3–1	Japan	Cape Town, South Africa
16:45	Lane 27'; Elmes 56'; Hickson 57'	Report	Tanaka 4'	Stadium: Hartleyvale Stadium

==== Malaysia U21 Series ====
7 July 2026 Match 1	Malaysia U21	0–5	Japan	Japan
18:00

==== 2026 Men's FIH Hockey World Cup ====
16 August 2026 Pool A	Argentina	3–0	Japan	Amstelveen, Netherlands
19:00	Toscani 21'; Méndez 54'; Casella 58'	Report		Stadium: Wagener Stadium

18 August 2026 Pool A	New Zealand	2–0	Japan	Amstelveen, Netherlands
09:30	Lane 12'; Thomas 46'	Report		Stadium: Wagener Stadium

20 August 2026 Pool A	Netherlands	4–1	Japan	Amstelveen, Netherlands
18:00	van Dam 12'; Janssen 50'; Reyenga 55', 56'	Report	Matsumoto 8'	Stadium: Wagener Stadium

22 August 2026 Pool G	Pakistan	4–3	Japan	Amstelveen, Netherlands
13:00	Rana 22', 32'; Hammadudin 33'; Shahid 41'	Report	H. Yamada 7'; Tanaka 15'; Yamasaki 36'	Stadium: Wagener Stadium

24 August 2026 Pool G	Japan	3–2	Wales	Amstelveen, Netherlands
09:30	S. Yamada 15'; Kawabe 28'; Matsumoto 60'	Report	Draper 49'; Welsh 60'	Stadium: Wagener Stadium

28 August 2026 13th place match	Japan	1–3	France	Amstelveen, Netherlands
09:30	Watanabe 22'	Report	Desgouillons 17'; Clément 59'; Charlet 59'	Stadium: Wagener Stadium

==== 2026 Asian Games ====
20 September 2026 Pool A	Japan	9–0	Sri Lanka	Kakamigahara, Japan
17:00	Kimura 15'; Yamasaki 18', 29', 46', 58'; Fujishima 25'; Kawabe 48'; S. Tanaka 51'; Ooka 55'	Report		Stadium: Gifu Prefectural Green Stadium

22 September 2026 Pool A	Japan	6–1	Bangladesh	Kakamigahara, Japan
17:00	Kawabe 1', 58'; Yamasaki 6'; Kimura 15'; Watanabe 29'; Matsumoto 41'	Report	Rakin 44'	Stadium: Gifu Prefectural Green Stadium

24 September 2026 Pool A	Indonesia	1–12	Japan	Kakamigahara, Japan
17:00	Wibowo 20'	Report	Kimura 2'; Takade 4'; Ooka 5'; Fujishima 9', 11', 34'; Kawabe 15'; Matsumoto 23'; K. Tanaka 41'; T. Tanaka 51', 58'; Yamasaki 53'	Stadium: Gifu Prefectural Green Stadium

26 September 2026 Pool A	Japan	0–2	India	Kakamigahara, Japan
17:00		Report	Abhishek 15'; Harmanpreet 40'	Stadium: Gifu Prefectural Green Stadium

28 September 2026 Pool A	South Korea	3–2	Japan	Kakamigahara, Japan
17:00	Yang 29', 42'; Rim 52'	Report	Yamasaki 4'; Fujishima 60'	Stadium: Gifu Prefectural Green Stadium

1 October 2026 5/8 Classification	Japan	9–1	Thailand	Kakamigahara, Japan
11:30	Fujishima 3', 29'; T. Tanaka 12', 17', 25', 41'; Kawabe 14', 52'; Yamasaki 22'	Report	Kuengsamrong 53'	Stadium: Gifu Prefectural Green Stadium

3 October 2026 5th place match	Japan	5–0	China	Kakamigahara, Japan
14:00	Matsumoto 21'; Kawabe 21', 60'; Ooka 48'; Yamasaki 60'	Report		Stadium: Gifu Prefectural Green Stadium

==== 2026 Asian Champions Trophy ====
27 October 2026 Group Stage	Japan	3–2	South Korea	Jalandhar, India
15:15	Fukuda 14'; Ooka 36'; Matsumoto 52'	Report	Han 15'; Jeong 59'	Stadium: Surjit Hockey Stadium

29 October 2026 Group Stage	Bangladesh	0–1	Japan	Jalandhar, India
16:45		Report	Fujishima 40'	Stadium: Surjit Hockey Stadium

30 October 2026 Group Stage	Japan	1–4	India	Jalandhar, India
19:00	Yamada 15'	Report	Abhishek 11', 51'; Harmanpreet 47'; Vishnukant 56'	Stadium: Surjit Hockey Stadium

1 November 2026 Group Stage	China	2–2	Japan	Jalandhar, India
16:45	Zhang. J 8'; Chen. B 60+'	Report	Fujishima 48'; Nagai 48'	Stadium: Surjit Hockey Stadium

2 November 2026 Group Stage	Japan	2–1	Malaysia	Jalandhar, India
16:45	Fukuda 24', 54'	Report	Azrai 10'	Stadium: Surjit Hockey Stadium

4 November 2026 Semi-final	Japan	0–0 (5–3 p)	Malaysia	Mohali, India
16:30		Report		Stadium: Olympian Balbir Singh Senior International Hockey Stadium
	Penalties
	Matsumoto (penalty shoot-out scored); Ooka (penalty shoot-out scored); T. Tanaka (penalty shoot-out scored); Ochiai (penalty shoot-out scored); S. Tanaka (penalty shoot-out scored)		(penalty shoot-out missed) Fa. Saari; (penalty shoot-out scored) Rozemi; (penalty shoot-out scored) Silverius; (penalty shoot-out scored) Azrai

5 November 2026 Gold medal match	India	4–1	Japan	Mohali, India
19:00	Lakra 42'; Dilpreet 48'; Jugraj 53'; Sukhjeet 54'	Report	Matsumoto 3'	Stadium: Olympian Balbir Singh Senior International Hockey Stadium

== See also ==
- Japan women's national field hockey team
