= Men's FIH Hockey Nations Cup =

International men's field hockey tournament

- Current season, competition or edition: 2025–26 Men's FIH Hockey Nations Cup
- Sport: Field hockey
- Founded: 2019; 7 years ago
- First season: 2022
- No. of teams: 8
- Most recent champion: France (1st title) (2025–26)
- Most titles: New Zealand (2 titles)
- Promotion to: FIH Pro League
- Relegation to: FIH Hockey Nations Cup 2
- Website: www.fih.hockey/events/nations-cup

The Men's FIH Hockey Nations Cup is an international men's field hockey tournament organised annually by the International Hockey Federation. The winner of the tournament qualifies for the Men's FIH Pro League.

The tournament was founded in 2019 and the first edition was held in November 2022 in Potchefstroom, South Africa. In June 2026, the tournament was expanded to ten teams competing, starting with the 2026–27 season.

== Results ==
Year	Host	Final			Third place match			Number of teams
Year	Host	Winner	Score	Runner-up	Third place	Score	Fourth place	Number of teams
2022	Potchefstroom, South Africa	South Africa	4–3	Ireland	South Korea	4–0	Malaysia	8
2023–24	Gniezno, Poland	New Zealand	1–1 (4–3 p.s.o.)	France	South Africa	4–3	Pakistan	9
2024–25	Kuala Lumpur, Malaysia	New Zealand	6–2	Pakistan	France	3–3 (3–2 p.s.o.)	South Korea	8
2025–26	Cape Town, South Africa	France	2–1	South Africa	New Zealand	3–1	Japan	9
2026–27	Lahore, Pakistan							10

== Summary ==
Team	Winners	Runners-up	Third place	Fourth place
New Zealand	2 (2023–24, 2024–25)		1 (2025–26)	
South Africa	1 (2022*)	1 (2025–26*)	1 (2023–24)	
France	1 (2025–26)	1 (2023–24)	1 (2024–25)	
Pakistan		1 (2024–25)		1 (2023–24)
Ireland		1 (2022)		
South Korea			1 (2022)	1 (2024–25)
Malaysia				1 (2022)
Japan				1 (2025–26)

* = host country

== Team appearances ==
Team	(South Africa) 2022	(Poland) 2023–24	(Malaysia) 2024–25	(South Africa) 2025–26	(Pakistan) 2026–27	Total
Austria	–	8th ▼	–	–	–	1
Canada	8th	5th	–	–	–	2
Egypt	–	–	–	–	Q	1
France	5th	2nd	3rd	1st ▲	–	4
Ireland	2nd ▲ (Note: South Africa withdrew and were replaced by Ireland to the 2023–24 Men's FIH Pro League.)	– (Note: New Zealand withdrew and were replaced by Ireland to the 2024–25 Men's FIH Pro League.)	–	7th	Q	3
Japan	6th	–	7th	4th	Q	4
Malaysia	4th	7th	6th	5th	Q	5
New Zealand	–	1st ▲	1st (Note: New Zealand withdrew and were replaced by Pakistan to the 2025–26 Men's FIH Pro League.)	3rd	Q	4
Pakistan	7th	4th	2nd ▲	–	Q	4
Poland	–	9th ▼	–	–	–	1
Scotland	–	–	–	6th	Q	2
South Africa	1st	3rd	8th ▼	2nd	Q	5
South Korea	3rd	6th	4th	9th	Q	5
United States	–	–	–	8th	Q	2
Wales	–	–	5th	WD	–	1
Total	8	9	8	9	10	

== See also ==
- Men's FIH Pro League
- Men's FIH Hockey Nations Cup 2
- Women's FIH Hockey Nations Cup
- Women's FIH Pro League
