= Pakistan national field hockey team tours and matches (2015–2019) =

- Season: 2015–2019

This page lists all the tours, and matches played by Pakistan national field hockey team from 2015 to 2019. During this period Pakistan's most successful tournaments were the Asian Champions Trophy (Champions: 2018) and South Asian Games (Champions: 2016). Worst results were failing to qualify for the 2016 Summer Olympics, first time Pakistan failed to qualify for the event and successively did not qualify for the 2020 Summer Olympics. Pakistan lost 9–1 to Australia in 2017 the second biggest defeat in history for the team.

== List of tours ==
| Year | Host(s) | Competition | GP | W | D | L | GF | GA | Result | Position | Head Coach |
|---|---|---|---|---|---|---|---|---|---|---|---|
| 2015 | Australia | Internationals | 5 | 2 | 0 | 3 | 11 | 20 | – | – | (Pakistan) Shahnaz Shiekh |
| 2015 | South Korea | Internationals | 3 | 0 | 1 | 2 | 5 | 9 | – | – | (Pakistan) Shahnaz Shiekh |
| 2015 | Belgium | 2014–15 Hockey World League | 7 | 1 | 2 | 4 | 9 | 16 | Pool stage | 8th | (Pakistan) Shahnaz Shiekh |
| 2016 | India | 2016 South Asian Games | 4 | 4 | 0 | 0 | 12 | 1 | Champions | 1st | (Pakistan) Muhammad Saqlain |
| 2016 | Malaysia | 2016 Sultan Azlan Shah Cup | 7 | 3 | 0 | 4 | 14 | 18 | Pool stage | 5th | (Pakistan) Khawaja Junaid |
| 2016 | Malaysia | 2016 Asian Champions Trophy | 7 | 4 | 0 | 3 | 16 | 14 | Runner-up | 2nd | (Pakistan) Khawaja Junaid |
| 2017 | New Zealand, Australia | Internationals | 9 | 2 | 2 | 5 | 15 | 25 | – | – | (Pakistan) Khawaja Junaid |
| 2017 | Ireland | Internationals | 3 | 0 | 1 | 2 | 6 | 8 | – | – | (Pakistan) Khawaja Junaid |
| 2017 | England | 2016–17 Hockey World League | 7 | 2 | 0 | 5 | 9 | 28 | Pool stage | 7th | (Pakistan) Khawaja Junaid |
| 2017 | Bangladesh | 2017 Hockey Asia Cup | 7 | 2 | 2 | 3 | 19 | 12 | Super four | 3rd | (Pakistan) Farhat Hassan Khan |
| 2017 | Australia | International Hockey Festival | 4 | 0 | 0 | 4 | 5 | 17 | Pool stage | 4th | (Pakistan) Farhat Hassan Khan |
| 2018 | Oman | Triangular series | 5 | 2 | 2 | 1 | 13 | 10 | Runner-up | 2nd | (Pakistan) Muhammad Saqlain |
| 2018 | Australia | 2018 Commonwealth Games | 5 | 1 | 4 | 0 | 9 | 7 | Pool stage | 7th | (Netherlands) Roelant Oltmans |
| 2018 | Belgium | 2018 Hockey Champions Trophy | 6 | 1 | 0 | 5 | 9 | 17 | Pool stage | 6th | (Netherlands) Roelant Oltmans |
| 2018 | Indonesia | 2018 Asian Games | 7 | 5 | 0 | 2 | 46 | 4 | Semifinals | 4th | (Netherlands) Roelant Oltmans |
| 2018 | Oman | 2018 Asian Champions Trophy | 6 | 4 | 1 | 1 | 18 | 10 | Champions | 1st | (Pakistan) Muhammad Saqlain |
| 2018 | India | 2018 Hockey World Cup | 4 | 0 | 1 | 3 | 2 | 12 | Crossovers | 12th | (Pakistan) Tauqeer Dar |
| 2019 | Germany | Internationals | 2 | 0 | 0 | 2 | 3 | 12 | – | – | (Pakistan) Khawaja Junaid |
| 2019 | Netherlands | 2019 FIH Olympic Qualifiers | 2 | 0 | 1 | 1 | 5 | 10 | Tie lost | – | (Pakistan) Khawaja Junaid |

== Matches ==
=== 2015 ===
==== International Hockey Challenge ====
2 May 2015
Match 1

| Australia | 6 – 0 | Pakistan |
|---|---|---|
| Whetton 4'; Ogilvie 11', 54'; Mitton 35'; Govers 49'; Brown 58' | Report |

Hobart, Australia

Stadium: Tasmanian Hockey Centre

5 May 2015
Match 2

| Pakistan | 4 – 1 | South Korea |
|---|---|---|
| Irfan 19'; Dilbar 22', 27'; Bhutta 49' | Report | Jang 56' |

Hobart, Australia

Stadium: Tasmanian Hockey Centre

7 May 2015
Match 3

| New Zealand | 4 – 2 | Pakistan |
|---|---|---|
| Hayward 23'; Panchia 35'; Burrows 39'; Child 48' | Report | Bhutta 2'; Rasool 12' |

Hobart, Australia

Stadium: Tasmanian Hockey Centre

9 May 2015
Match 4

| South Korea | 4 – 5 | Pakistan |
|---|---|---|
| Kim 18'; Lee 20'; Nam 29'; N. Lee 48' | Report | Dilbar 12', 70'; Irfan 35', 57'; Waqas 55' |

Hobart, Australia

Stadium: Tasmanian Hockey Centre

10 May 2015
Match 5

| Australia | 5 – 0 | Pakistan |
|---|---|---|
| Ockenden 30'; Ciriello 43'; Simpson 44'; Mitton 54'; Ogilvie 58' | Report |

Hobart, Australia

Stadium: Tasmanian Hockey Centre

==== 2015 Series – South Korea ====
18 May 2015
Test match

| South Korea | 4 – 0 | Pakistan |
|---|---|---|
| | Report |

Incheon, South Korea

Stadium: Seonhak Hockey Stadium

20 May 2015
Test match

| South Korea | 3 – 3 | Pakistan |
|---|---|---|
| | Report | Ali 9'; Bhutta 33'; Waqas 49' |

Incheon, South Korea

Stadium: Seonhak Hockey Stadium

22 May 2015
Test match

| South Korea | 2 – 2 | Pakistan |
|---|---|---|
| | Report | Irfan 37'; Rasool 48' |

Incheon, South Korea

Stadium: Seonhak Hockey Stadium

==== 2014–15 FIH Hockey World League – Semifinals ====
20 June 2015
Pool stage

| Pakistan | 2 – 1 | Poland |
|---|---|---|
| Irfan 4'; Waqas 54' | Report | Bratkowski 51' |

Antwerp, Belgium

Stadium: KHC Dragons

24 June 2015
Pool stage

| Pakistan | 1 – 6 | Australia |
|---|---|---|
| Irfan 13' | Report | Whetton 9'; Beale 32'; Swann 42'; Dwyer 49'; B. Govers 54', 58' |

Antwerp, Belgium

Stadium: KHC Dragons

26 June 2015
Pool stage

| Pakistan | 2 – 2 | India |
|---|---|---|
| Imran 23', 37' | Report | Ramandeep 13', 39' |

Antwerp, Belgium

Stadium: KHC Dragons

28 June 2015
Pool stage

| Pakistan | 2 – 2 | France |
|---|---|---|
| Waqas 36'; Dilbar 45' | Report | Martin–Brisac 21'; Masson 38' |

Antwerp, Belgium

Stadium: KHC Dragons

1 July 2015
Quarterfinal

| Great Britain | 2 – 1 | Pakistan |
|---|---|---|
| Griffiths 4'; Brogdon 9' | Report | Bhutta 48' |

Antwerp, Belgium

Stadium: KHC Dragons

3 July 2015
Crossover

| Ireland | 1 – 0 | Pakistan |
|---|---|---|
| Sothern 46' | Report |

Antwerp, Belgium

Stadium: KHC Dragons

5 July 2015
Seventh and eighth place

| Pakistan | 1 – 2 | France |
|---|---|---|
| Tousiq 48' | Report | Martin–Brisac 13'; H. Genestet 30' |

Antwerp, Belgium

Stadium: KHC Dragons

=== 2016 ===
==== 2016 South Asian Games ====
7 February 2016
Pool stage

| Pakistan | 3 - 0 | Sri Lanka |
|---|---|---|
| Tasawar 12'; Bilal 19'; Qadir 50' | Report |

Guwahati, India

Stadium: Md. Tayabullah Hockey Stadium

8 February 2016
Pool stage

| Pakistan | 2 - 1 | India |
|---|---|---|
| Qadir 11', 37' | Report | Antil 53' |

Guwahati, India

Stadium: Md. Tayabullah Hockey Stadium

10 February 2016
Pool stage

| Bangladesh | 0 - 6 | Pakistan |
|---|---|---|
| | Report | Bhutta 2'; Bilal 7'; Qadir 34'; Rehman 43'; Tasawar 58' |

Guwahati, India

Stadium: Md. Tayabullah Hockey Stadium

12 February 2016
Final

| India | 0 - 1 | Pakistan |
|---|---|---|
| | Report | Rehman 35' |

Guwahati, India

Stadium: Md. Tayabullah Hockey Stadium

==== 2016 Sultan Azlan Shah Cup ====
6 April 2016
Pool stage

| Pakistan | 3 – 1 | Canada |
|---|---|---|
| Qadir 27', 28'; Arshad 52' | Report | Hildreth 48' |

Ipoh, Malaysia

Stadium: Azlan Shah Stadium

9 April 2016
Pool stage

| New Zealand | 5 – 3 | Pakistan |
|---|---|---|
| Jenness 11'; Child 19'; Woods 39', 42'; Russell 44' | Report | Qadir 8', 52'; Irfan Jr. 23' |

Ipoh, Malaysia

Stadium: Azlan Shah Stadium

10 April 2016
Pool stage

| Australia | 4 – 0 | Pakistan |
|---|---|---|
| Govers 24'; Craig 41'; Dwyer 42'; Zalewski 52' | Report |

Ipoh, Malaysia

Stadium: Azlan Shah Stadium

12 April 2016
Pool stage

| Pakistan | 1 – 5 | India |
|---|---|---|
| Irfan 7' | Report | Manpreet Singh 4'; Sowmarpet 10', 41'; Talwinder Singh 50'; Rupinder Pal Singh 54' |

Ipoh, Malaysia

Stadium: Azlan Shah Stadium

13 April 2016
Pool stage

| Pakistan | 0 – 1 | Malaysia |
|---|---|---|
| | Report | Razie 4' |

Ipoh, Malaysia

Stadium: Azlan Shah Stadium

15 April 2016
Pool stage

| Japan | 1 – 4 | Pakistan |
|---|---|---|
| Yamada 48' | Report | Shan 20'; Ali 24'; Qadir 8', 57' |

Ipoh, Malaysia

Stadium: Azlan Shah Stadium

16 April 2016
Fifth and sixth place

| Pakistan | 3 – 1 | Canada |
|---|---|---|
| Fareed 11'; A. Ahmed 27'; Arshad 57' | Report | Smythe 51' |

Ipoh, Malaysia

Stadium: Azlan Shah Stadium

==== 2016 Asian Champions Trophy ====
20 October 2016
Pool stage

| Malaysia | 4 – 2 | Pakistan |
|---|---|---|
| Firhan 13'; Fitri 37', 60'; Shahril 41' | Report | Bilal 18', 34' |

Kuantan, Malaysia

Stadium: Stadium Wisma Belia

21 October 2016
Pool stage

| Pakistan | 1 – 0 | South Korea |
|---|---|---|
| Haseem 60' | Report |

Kuantan, Malaysia

Stadium: Stadium Wisma Belia

23 October 2016
Pool stage

| India | 3 – 2 | Pakistan |
|---|---|---|
| Pardeep 22'; Rupinder 43'; Ramandeep 44' | Report | Rizwan Sr. 31'; Irfan 39' |

Kuantan, Malaysia

Stadium: Stadium Wisma Belia

25 October 2016
Pool stage

| Pakistan | 4 – 3 | Japan |
|---|---|---|
| Irfan 5'; Bilal 12', 52'; Rizwan Sr. 36' | Report | S. Tanaka 10'; K. Tanaka 30'; Z. Hirotaka 54' |

Kuantan, Malaysia

Stadium: Stadium Wisma Belia

27 October 2016
Pool stage

| Pakistan | 4 – 0 | China |
|---|---|---|
| Haseem 21', 31'; Shan 48'; Irfan 48' | Report |

Kuantan, Malaysia

Stadium: Stadium Wisma Belia

29 October 2016
Semifinal

| Malaysia | 1 - 1 | Pakistan |
|---|---|---|
| Shahril 18' | Report | Haseem 34' |
Penalties
| Firhan (penalty shoot-out scored); Faizal (penalty shoot-out scored); Jali (penalty shoot-out missed); Shahril (penalty shoot-out missed); Fitri (penalty shoot-out missed) | 2–3 | (penalty shoot-out scored) Haseem; (penalty shoot-out missed) Rizwan Sr. (penalty shoot-out scored) Irfan; (penalty shoot-out scored) Qadir |

Kuantan, Malaysia

Stadium: Stadium Wisma Belia

30 October 2016
Final

| India | 3 – 2 | Pakistan |
|---|---|---|
| Rupinder 18'; Affan 23'; Nikkin 51' | Report | Bilal 26'; Shan 38' |

Kuantan, Malaysia

Stadium: Stadium Wisma Belia

=== 2017 ===
==== 2017 Series – New Zealand ====
17 March 2017
Test match

| New Zealand | 3 – 2 | Pakistan |
|---|---|---|
| Lane 28'; Jenness 44'; Bennett 50' | Report | Dilbar 30'; Bilal 52' |

Wellington, New Zealand

Stadium: National Hockey Stadium

18 March 2017
Test match

| New Zealand | 2 – 2 | Pakistan |
|---|---|---|
| Lane 24'; Wilcox 38' | Report | Mahmood 38'; Haseem 42' |

Wellington, New Zealand

Stadium: National Hockey Stadium

20 March 2017
Test match

| New Zealand | 2 – 4 | Pakistan |
|---|---|---|
| Bennett 45'; Jenness 59' | Report | Haseem 6'; Mahmood 33', 35', 53' |

Wellington, New Zealand

Stadium: National Hockey Stadium

22 March 2017
Test match

| New Zealand | 1 – 2 | Pakistan |
|---|---|---|
| Keane 16' | Report | Haseem 10', 22' |

Wairarapa, New Zealand

Stadium: Trust House Hockey

23 March 2017
Test match

| New Zealand | 1 – 1 | Pakistan |
|---|---|---|
| Lane 50' | Report | Irfan 47' |

Wairarapa, New Zealand

Stadium: Trust House Hockey

==== 2017 Series – Australia ====
28 March 2017
Test match

| Australia | 6 – 1 | Pakistan |
|---|---|---|
| Mitton 11'; Hayward 14'; Wickham 44'; Dawson 48'; Craig 51', 53' | Report | Haseem 60' |

Darwin, Australia

Stadium: Marrara Hockey Centre

29 March 2017
Test match

| Australia | 3 – 0 | Pakistan |
|---|---|---|
| Wickham 15'; Mitton 30'; Kleinschmidt 33' | Report |

Darwin, Australia

Stadium: Marrara Hockey Centre

31 March 2017
Test match

| Australia | 2 – 0 | Pakistan |
|---|---|---|
| Hayward 19'; Mitton 37' | Report |

Darwin, Australia

Stadium: Marrara Hockey Centre

1 April 2017
Test match

| Australia | 5 – 3 | Pakistan |
|---|---|---|
| Arunasalam 4'; Knowles 10'; Mitton 30'; Kleinschmidt 42'; Ogilvie 60' | Report | Mahmood 4', 23'; Bhutta 21' |

Darwin, Australia

Stadium: Marrara Hockey Centre

==== 2017 Series – Ireland ====
1 June 2017
Test match

| Ireland | 2 - 2 | Pakistan |
|---|---|---|
| Harte 17'; Duncan 55' | Report | Bilal 9'; Shan 28' |

Lisburn, Northern Ireland

Stadium: Lisnagarvey Hockey Club

3 June 2017
Test match

| Ireland | 3 - 2 | Pakistan |
|---|---|---|
| Murray 7'; Caruth 38'; O'Donoghue 58' | Report | Bhutta 21'; Shan 52' |

Lisburn, Northern Ireland

Stadium: Lisnagarvey Hockey Club

4 June 2017
Test match

| Ireland | 3 - 2 | Pakistan |
|---|---|---|
| Sothern 19', 44'; Duncan 27' | Report | Rizwan Jr. 31'; Bhutta 59' |

Lisburn, Northern Ireland

Stadium: Lisnagarvey Hockey Club

==== 2016–17 FIH Hockey World League – Semifinals ====
15 June 2017
Pool stage

| Netherlands | 4 – 0 | Pakistan |
|---|---|---|
| Brinkman 6'; Pruyser 26'; Van der Weerden 42'; Kemperman 49' | Report |

London, England

Stadium: Lee Valley Hockey and Tennis Centre

16 June 2017
Pool stage

| Pakistan | 0 – 6 | Canada |
|---|---|---|
| | Report | Tupper 11'; Smythe 19', 27'; Van Son 28'; Bissett 50'; Johnston 60+' |

London, England

Stadium: Lee Valley Hockey and Tennis Centre

18 June 2017
Pool stage

| Pakistan | 1 – 7 | India |
|---|---|---|
| Bhutta 57' | Report | Harm. Singh 13', 33'; T. Singh 21', 24'; A. Singh 47', 59'; Mor 49' |

London, England

Stadium: Lee Valley Hockey and Tennis Centre

19 June 2017
Pool stage

| Scotland | 1 – 3 | Pakistan |
|---|---|---|
| Adams 13' | Report | Irfan 34'; Qadir 42'; Bilal 46' |

London, England

Stadium: Lee Valley Hockey and Tennis Centre

22 June 2017
Quarterfinal

| Argentina | 3 – 1 | Pakistan |
|---|---|---|
| Casella 22', 44'; Peillat 33' | Report | Shan 49' |

London, England

Stadium: Lee Valley Hockey and Tennis Centre

24 June 2017
Crossover

| Pakistan | 1 - 6 | India |
|---|---|---|
| Ahmad 41' | Report | R. Singh 8', 28'; T. Singh 25'; A. Singh 27'; Harm. Singh 36'; M. Singh 59' |

London, England

Stadium: Lee Valley Hockey and Tennis Centre

25 June 2017
Seventh and eighth place

| Pakistan | 3 - 1 | China |
|---|---|---|
| Bhutta 51', 56'; Irfan 56' | Report | Guo X. 58' |

London, England

Stadium: Lee Valley Hockey and Tennis Centre

==== 2017 Hockey Asia Cup ====
11 October 2017
Pool stage

| Pakistan | 7 – 0 | Bangladesh |
|---|---|---|
| Mahmood 18', 41', 50'; Butt 33', 47'; Qadir 33', 60' | Report |

Dhaka, Bangladesh

Stadium: Maulana Bhasani Hockey Stadium

13 October 2017
Pool stage

| Japan | 2 – 2 | Pakistan |
|---|---|---|
| Ke. Tanaka 22'; Yoshihara 29' | Report | Qadir 16'; Bhutta 50' |

Dhaka, Bangladesh

Stadium: Maulana Bhasani Hockey Stadium

15 October 2017
Pool stage

| Pakistan | 1 – 3 | India |
|---|---|---|
| Shan 48' | Report | Kangujam 17'; Ramandeep 44'; Harmanpreet 45' |

Dhaka, Bangladesh

Stadium: Maulana Bhasani Hockey Stadium

18 October 2017
Super four

| Malaysia | 3 – 2 | Pakistan |
|---|---|---|
| Razie 10'; Shahril 25'; Fitri 34' | Report | Bhutta 1'; Yaqoob 19' |

Dhaka, Bangladesh

Stadium: Maulana Bhasani Hockey Stadium

19 October 2017
Super four

| South Korea | 1 – 1 | Pakistan |
|---|---|---|
| Nam-yong 48' | Report | Ahmad 15' |

Dhaka, Bangladesh

Stadium: Maulana Bhasani Hockey Stadium

21 October 2017
Super four

| India | 4 – 0 | Pakistan |
|---|---|---|
| Satbir 39'; Harmanpreet 51'; Lalit 52'; Gurjant 57' | Report |

Dhaka, Bangladesh

Stadium: Maulana Bhasani Hockey Stadium

22 October 2017
Third and fourth place

| South Korea | 3 – 6 | Pakistan |
|---|---|---|
| Suk-hoon 20'; Nam-yong 43'; In-woo 55' | Report | Ahmad 10', 30', 36'; R. Mehmood 26'; Mahmood 32'; Yaqoob 56' |

Dhaka, Bangladesh

Stadium: Maulana Bhasani Hockey Stadium

==== International Hockey Festival ====
8 November 2017
Pool stage

| Australia | 9 – 1 | Pakistan |
|---|---|---|
| Hayward 8'; Whetton 12'; Kleinschmidt 18', 33'; Govers 43', 55', 60'; Arunasalam 47'; Wickham 57' | Report | Mahmood 32' |

Melbourne, Australia

Stadium: Melbourne Sports Centre

9 November 2017
Pool stage

| Pakistan | 1 – 3 | Japan |
|---|---|---|
| Atiq 60' | Report | Tannaka 14', 46'; Mitani 50' |

Melbourne, Australia

Stadium: Melbourne Sports Centre

11 November 2017
Pool stage

| New Zealand | 3 – 2 | Pakistan |
|---|---|---|
| Philips 18'; Muir 37'; Child 57' | | Bhutta 6' |

Melbourne, Australia

Stadium: Melbourne Sports Centre

12 November 2017
Third and fourth place

| Japan | 2 - 1 | Pakistan |
|---|---|---|
| Tannaka 14'; Murata 57' | Report | Ahmad 13' |

Melbourne, Australia

Stadium: Melbourne Sports Centre

=== 2018 ===
==== 2018 Series – Triangular ====
14 February 2018
Pool stage

| Pakistan | 3 – 0 | Oman |
|---|---|---|
| Shan 13'; Ahmad 21'; Rasool 45' | Report |

Muscat, Oman

Stadium: Sultan Qaboos Sports Complex

15 February 2018
Pool stage

| Japan | 2 – 2 | Pakistan |
|---|---|---|
| Yamada 54'; Yamasaki 54' | Report | Saeed 10'; Mahmood 58' |

Muscat, Oman

Stadium: Sultan Qaboos Sports Complex

17 February 2018
Pool stage

| Pakistan | 4 – 4 | Oman |
|---|---|---|
| Qadir 2'; Mahmood 6'; Rasool 10', 43' | Report | Al–Qasmi 11'; Al–Hasni 20'; Bait 24'; Al–Fazari 25' |

Muscat, Oman

Stadium: Sultan Qaboos Sports Complex

18 February 2018
Pool stage

| Japan | 1 – 2 | Pakistan |
|---|---|---|
| Tanaka 24' | Report | Ali 32'; Bhutta 48' |

Muscat, Oman

Stadium: Sultan Qaboos Sports Complex

20 February 2018
Final

| Pakistan | 2 – 3 | Japan |
|---|---|---|
| Qadir 14'; Ali 56' | Report | Yamasaki 4'; Murata 12'; Watuki 50' |

Muscat, Oman

Stadium: Sultan Qaboos Sports Complex

==== 2018 Commonwealth Games ====
5 April 2018
Pool stage

| Pakistan | 1 – 1 | Wales |
|---|---|---|
| Ali 39' | Report | Shipperley 33' |

Gold Coast, Australia

Stadium: Gold Coast Hockey Centre

7 April 2018
Pool stage

| India | 2 – 2 | Pakistan |
|---|---|---|
| Dilpreet 13'; Harmanpreet 20' | Report | Irfan Jr. 39'; Ali 60' |

Gold Coast, Australia

Stadium: Gold Coast Hockey Centre

8 April 2018
Pool stage

| England | 2 – 2 | Pakistan |
|---|---|---|
| Gleghorne 34'; Ward 51' | Report | Qadir 33'; Ali 57' |

Gold Coast, Australia

Stadium: Gold Coast Hockey Centre

11 April 2018
Pool stage

| Malaysia | 1 – 1 | Pakistan |
|---|---|---|
| Rosli 39' | Report | Rasool 9' |

Gold Coast, Australia

Stadium: Gold Coast Hockey Centre

13 April 2018
Seventh and eighth place

| Canada | 1 – 3 | Pakistan |
|---|---|---|
| Kirkpatrick 12' | Report | Qadir 34'; Ali 40'; Irfan Jr. 57' |

Gold Coast, Australia

Stadium: Gold Coast Hockey Centre

==== 2018 Hockey Champions Trophy ====
23 June 2018
Pool stage

| India | 4 – 0 | Pakistan |
|---|---|---|
| Ramandeep 26'; Dilpreet 54'; Mandeep 57'; Upadhyay 60' | Report |

Breda, Netherlands

Stadium: Breda Hockey & Bandy Club

24 June 2018
Pool stage

| Australia | 2 – 1 | Pakistan |
|---|---|---|
| Mitton 12'; Govers 56' | Report | Ahmad 9' |

Breda, Netherlands

Stadium: Breda Hockey & Bandy Club

26 June 2018
Pool stage

| Netherlands | 4 – 0 | Pakistan |
|---|---|---|
| Kemperman 25'; Verga 29'; Van Dam 47'; Pruyser 50' | Report |

Breda, Netherlands

Stadium: Breda Hockey & Bandy Club

28 June 2018
Pool stage

| Argentina | 1 – 4 | Pakistan |
|---|---|---|
| Paredes 29' | Report | Irfan 10'; Ali 47'; Ahmad 49'; Bilal 58' |

Breda, Netherlands

Stadium: Breda Hockey & Bandy Club

29 June 2018
Pool stage

| Belgium | 4 – 2 | Pakistan |
|---|---|---|
| Briels 36'; Keusters 39'; Charlier 51' van Aubel 54' | Report | Bilal 11', 38' |

Breda, Netherlands

Stadium: Breda Hockey & Bandy Club

1 July 2018
Fifth and sixth place

| Belgium | 2 – 2 | Pakistan |
|---|---|---|
| Boon 27' van Aubel 34' | Report | Shan 16'; Arshad 60' |
Penalties
| Gougnard (penalty shoot-out missed); Denayer (penalty shoot-out scored); Wegnez (penalty shoot-out missed); Van Doren (penalty shoot-out missed); De Sloover (penalty shoot-out scored) | 2 – 1 | (penalty shoot-out missed) Arshad; (penalty shoot-out scored) Mahmood; (penalty shoot-out missed) Bhutta; (penalty shoot-out missed) Shan; (penalty shoot-out missed) Rasool |

Breda, Netherlands

Stadium: Breda Hockey & Bandy Club

==== 2018 Asian Games ====
20 August 2018
Pool stage

| Pakistan | 10 – 0 | Thailand |
|---|---|---|
| Tousiq 15', 50'; Irfan 22'; Atiq 23', 39', 43'; Mahmood 31'; Ali 33'; Mahmood 42', 49' | Report |

Jakarta, Indonesia

Stadium: GBK Sports Complex

22 August 2018
Pool stage

| Pakistan | 10 – 0 | Oman |
|---|---|---|
| Bhutta 2'; Ahmad 15'; Irfan 34', 59'; Shan 37', 44', 55'; Dilbar 40', 49'; Atiq 41' | Report |

Jakarta, Indonesia

Stadium: GBK Sports Complex

24 August 2018
Pool stage

| Kazakhstan | 0 – 16 | Pakistan |
|---|---|---|
| | Report | Tousiq 2', 34', 47', 60'; Dilbar 7'; Shan 13', 38'; Bhutta 15', 58'; Mahmood 29', 30', 38'; R. Ali 51', 55'; Atiq 59'; Ali 60+' |

Jakarta, Indonesia

Stadium: GBK Sports Complex

26 August 2018
Pool stage

| Pakistan | 4 – 1 | Malaysia |
|---|---|---|
| Irfan 6'; Ahmad 38', 48'; Ali 43' | Report | Jali 11' |

Jakarta, Indonesia

Stadium: GBK Sports Complex

28 August 2018
Pool stage

| Bangladesh | 0 – 5 | Pakistan |
|---|---|---|
| | Report | Atiq 2', 48'; Ali 9', 25'; Shan 36' |

Jakarta, Indonesia

Stadium: GBK Sports Complex

30 August 2018
Semifinal

| Pakistan | 0 – 1 | Japan |
|---|---|---|
| | Report | Yamada 18' |

Jakarta, Indonesia

Stadium: GBK Sports Complex

1 September 2018
Third and fourth place

| Pakistan | 1 – 2 | India |
|---|---|---|
| Atiq 52' | Report | Akashdeep 3'; Harmanpreet 50' |

Jakarta, Indonesia

Stadium: GBK Sports Complex

==== 2018 Asian Champions Trophy ====
19 October 2018
Pool stage

| Pakistan | 3 – 1 | South Korea |
|---|---|---|
| Ahmad 12'; Bhutta 18'; Rizwan Jr. 42' | Report | Kim Hyeong–jin 51' |

Muscat, Oman

Stadium: Sultan Qaboos Sports Complex

20 October 2018
Pool stage

| Pakistan | 1 – 3 | India |
|---|---|---|
| Irfan Jr. 1' | Report | Manpreet 24'; Mandeep 31'; Dilpreet 42' |

Muscat, Oman

Stadium: Sultan Qaboos Sports Complex

22 October 2018
Pool stage

| Oman | 1 – 8 | Pakistan |
|---|---|---|
| Al Lawati 60' | Report | Bilal 13', 18', 39'; Irfan Jr. 22'; Butt 26'; Irfan 34'; Mahmood 45'; Atiq 52' |

Muscat, Oman

Stadium: Sultan Qaboos Sports Complex

24 October 2018
Pool stage

| Japan | 1 – 1 | Pakistan |
|---|---|---|
| Kitazato 12' | Report | Ali 25' |

Muscat, Oman

Stadium: Sultan Qaboos Sports Complex

25 October 2018
Pool stage

| Pakistan | 1 – 0 | Malaysia |
|---|---|---|
| Irfan Jr. 53' | Report |

Muscat, Oman

Stadium: Sultan Qaboos Sports Complex

27 October 2018
Semifinal

| Pakistan | 4 – 4 | Malaysia |
|---|---|---|
| Irfan Jr. 6'; Bilal 12', 20'; Mahmood 15' | Report | Faizal 2', 56'; Tengku 43'; Aiman 44' |
Penalties
| Tousiq (penalty shoot-out scored); Mahmood (penalty shoot-out scored); Ahmad (penalty shoot-out missed); Irfan Jr. (penalty shoot-out missed); Butt (penalty shoot-out scored) | 3–1 | (penalty shoot-out missed) Ashari; (penalty shoot-out missed) Faizal; (penalty shoot-out scored) Aiman; (penalty shoot-out missed) Shahril |

Muscat, Oman

Stadium: Sultan Qaboos Sports Complex

==== 2018 FIH Hockey World Cup ====
1 December 2018
Pool stage

| Germany | 1 – 0 | Pakistan |
|---|---|---|
| Miltkau 36' | Report |

Bhubaneswar, India

Stadium: Kalinga Stadium

5 December 2018
Pool stage

| Malaysia | 1 – 1 | Pakistan |
|---|---|---|
| Faizal 55' | Report | Atiq 51' |

Bhubaneswar, India

Stadium: Kalinga Stadium

9 December 2018
Pool stage

| Netherlands | 5 – 1 | Pakistan |
|---|---|---|
| Brinkman 7'; Verga 27'; De Voogd 37'; Croon 47'; Van der Weerden 59' | Report | Bhutta 9' |

Bhubaneswar, India

Stadium: Kalinga Stadium

11 December 2018
Crossover

| Belgium | 5 – 0 | Pakistan |
|---|---|---|
| Hendrickx 10'; Briels 13'; Charlier 27'; Dockier 35'; Boon 53' | Report |

Bhubaneswar, India

Stadium: Kalinga Stadium

=== 2019 ===
==== 2019 Series – Germany ====
22 October 2019
Test match

| Germany | 6 – 1 | Pakistan |
|---|---|---|
| Rühr 12', 37', 46'; Miltkau 20'; Häner 31'; Staib 39' | Report | Bhutta 46' |

Mönchengladbach, Germany

Stadium: Warsteiner HockeyPark

23 October 2019
Test match

| Germany | 6 – 2 | Pakistan |
|---|---|---|
| Miltkau 32'; Fuchs 45'; Rühr 47', 56'; Große 57' | Report | Ghazanfar 45'; R. Mehmood 55' |

Mönchengladbach, Germany

Stadium: Warsteiner HockeyPark

==== 2019 FIH Olympic Qualifiers ====
26 October 2019
Match 1

| Netherlands | 4 – 4 | Pakistan |
|---|---|---|
| Van der Weerden 20', 60'; Kellerman 21'; Kemperman 52' | Report | Mubashar 5', 58'; Ghazanfar 25'; Rizwan Sr. 38' |

Amstelveen, Netherlands

Stadium: Wagener Stadium

27 October 2019
Match 2

| Netherlands | 6 – 1 | Pakistan |
|---|---|---|
| Kellerman 9'; Van der Weerden 17', 29'; Pruyser 22'; Pieters 39'; Janssen 43' | Report | R. Ali 53' |

Amstelveen, Netherlands

Stadium: Wagener Stadium
