= 2016 Sultan Azlan Shah Cup =

Field hockey tournament

Tournament details
- Host country: Malaysia
- City: Ipoh
- Dates: 6–16 April 2016
- Teams: 7
- Venue: Azlan Shah Stadium

Final positions
- Champions: Australia (9th title)
- Runner-up: India
- Third place: New Zealand

Tournament statistics
- Matches played: 24
- Goals scored: 107 (4.46 per match)
- Top scorer: (Pakistan) Arslan Qadir (6 goals)
All statistics are correct as of 7 April 2016
| |

The 2016 Sultan Azlan Shah Cup was the 25th edition of the Sultan Azlan Shah Cup. It was held in Ipoh, Perak, Malaysia from 6–16 April 2016.

Australia won the title for the ninth time after defeating India 4–0 in final.

== Participating nations ==
Seven countries are participating in this year's tournament:

- Australia
- India
- Pakistan
- Japan
- Malaysia
- New Zealand
- Canada

== Umpires ==
- Peter Wright (RSA)
- Lim Hong Zhen (SIN)
- Nazmi Kamarudin (MAS)
- Michihiko Watanabe (JPN)
- Deric Leung (CAN)
- Javed Shaikh (IND)
- Simon Taylor (NZL)
- Murray Grime (AUS)
- Hafiz Atif Latif (PAK)

== Results ==
All times are Malaysia Standard Time (UTC+08:00)

=== Pool ===
| Pos | Team | Pld | W | D | L | GF | GA | GD | Pts | Qualification |
|---|---|---|---|---|---|---|---|---|---|---|
| 1 | Australia | 6 | 6 | 0 | 0 | 21 | 3 | +18 | 18 | Advance to Final |
| 2 | India | 6 | 4 | 0 | 2 | 18 | 11 | +7 | 12 | Advance to Final |
| 3 | New Zealand | 6 | 3 | 2 | 1 | 15 | 10 | +5 | 11 | Third place match |
| 4 | Malaysia | 6 | 2 | 2 | 2 | 12 | 19 | −7 | 8 | Third place match |
| 5 | Pakistan | 6 | 2 | 0 | 4 | 11 | 17 | −6 | 6 | Fifth place match |
| 6 | Canada | 6 | 1 | 2 | 3 | 8 | 13 | −5 | 5 | Fifth place match |
| 7 | Japan | 6 | 0 | 0 | 6 | 8 | 20 | −12 | 0 | |

Source: FIH
Rules for classification: 1) points; 2) goal difference; 3) goals scored; 4) head-to-head result.

6 April 2016
16:05

| Pakistan | 3–1 | Canada |
|---|---|---|
| Qadir 27', 28'; Arshad 52' | Report | Hildreth 48' |

Umpires:
Simon Taylor (NZL)
Michihiko Watanabe (JPN)

6 April 2016
18:05

| Japan | 1–2 | India |
|---|---|---|
| Kitazato 17' | Report | Harmanpreet 25'; Sardar 32' |

Umpires:
Murray Grime (AUS)
Deric Leung (CAN)

6 April 2016
20:35

| New Zealand | 3–3 | Malaysia |
|---|---|---|
| Wilson 22', 34'; Child 55' | Report | Firhan 15'; Razie 44'; Shahril 48' |

Umpires:
Peter Wright (RSA)
Hafiz Atif Latif (PAK)

7 April 2016
16:05

| Australia | 5–1 | India |
|---|---|---|
| Govers 5'; Whetton 13'; Ockenden 20'; Orchard 26'; Gohdes 53' | Report | Rupinder Pal 8' |

Umpires:
Peter Wright (RSA)
Lim Hong Zhen (SIN)

7 April 2016
18:05

| Canada | 1–1 | New Zealand |
|---|---|---|
| Johnston 25' | Report | Woods 45' |

Umpires:
Javed Shaikh (IND)
Nazmi Kamarudin (MAS)

7 April 2016
20:35

| Malaysia | 4–3 | Japan |
|---|---|---|
| Razie 2', 11'; Haziq 14'; Fitri 32' | Report | Sakamoto 3'; Yamada 54', 60' |

Umpires:
Simon Taylor (NZL)
Deric Leung (CAN)

9 April 2016
16:05

| Canada | 3–1 | Japan |
|---|---|---|
| Pearson 34'; Ho-Garcia 35'; Tupper 45' | Report | Sakamoto 42' |

Umpires:
Nazmi Kamarudin (MAS)
Hafiz Atif Latif (PAK)

9 April 2016
18:05

| New Zealand | 5–3 | Pakistan |
|---|---|---|
| Jenness 11'; Child 19'; Woods 39', 42'; Russell 44' | Report | Qadir 8', 52'; Irfan 23' |

Umpires:
Murray Grime (AUS)
Lim Hong Zhen (SIN)

9 April 2016
20:35

| Malaysia | 1–5 | Australia |
|---|---|---|
| Razie 24' | Report | Whetton 26'; Ogilvie 40', 41'; Gohdes 40'; Craig 55' |

Umpires:
Javed Shaikh (MAS)
Michihiko Watanabe (JPN)

10 April 2016
16:05

| Japan | 1–4 | New Zealand |
|---|---|---|
| Murata 20' | Report | Wilson 4'; Child 13'; Woods 27'; Inglis 58' |

Umpires:
Deric Leung (CAN)
Murray Grime (AUS)

10 April 2016
18:05

| Pakistan | 0–4 | Australia |
|---|---|---|
| | Report | Govers 24'; Craig 41'; Dwyer 42'; Zalewski 52' |

Umpires:
Simon Taylor (NZL)
Nazmi Kamarudin (MAS)

10 April 2016
20:35

| India | 3–1 | Canada |
|---|---|---|
| Thimmaiah 3'; Harmanpreet 41'; Talwinder 57' | Report | Pereira 23' |

Umpires:
Peter Wright (RSA)
Michihiko Watanabe (JPN)

12 April 2016
16:05

| New Zealand | 0–1 | Australia |
|---|---|---|
| | Report | Dwyer 22' |

Umpires:
Javed Shaikh (IND)
Peter Wright (RSA)

12 April 2016
18:05

| India | 5–1 | Pakistan |
|---|---|---|
| Manpreet 4'; Sunil 10', 41'; Talwinder 50'; Rupinder Pal 54' | Report | Irfan 7' |

Umpires:
Murray Grime (AUS)
Simon Taylor (NZL)

12 April 2016
20:35

| Canada | 2–2 | Malaysia |
|---|---|---|
| Tupper 21'; Guest 45' | Report | Shahril 29'; Nabil 31' |

Umpires:
Hafiz Atif Latif (PAK)
Lim Hong Zhen (SIN)

13 April 2016
16:05

| India | 1–2 | New Zealand |
|---|---|---|
| Mandeep 36' | Report | Russell 28'; Wilson 41' |

Umpires:
Murray Grime (AUS)
Lim Hong Zhen (SIN)

13 April 2016
18:05

| Australia | 3–1 | Japan |
|---|---|---|
| Dwyer 17', 36'; Govers 30' | Report | Fukuda 37' |

Umpires:
Simon Taylor (NZL)
Nazmi Kamarudin (MAS)

13 April 2016
20:35

| Pakistan | 0–1 | Malaysia |
|---|---|---|
| | Report | Razie 4' |

Umpires:
Michihiko Watanabe (JPN)
Deric Leung (CAN)

15 April 2016
16:05

| Japan | 1–4 | Pakistan |
|---|---|---|
| Yamada 48' | Report | Shan 20'; Ali 24'; Qadir 8', 57' |

Umpires:
Lim Hong Zhen (SIN)
Nazmi Kamarudin (MAS)

15 April 2016
18:05

| Australia | 3–0 | Canada |
|---|---|---|
| Knowles 16'; Govers 33'; Ogilvie 36' | Report |

Umpires:
Hafiz Atif Latif (PAK)
Javed Shaikh (IND)

15 April 2016
20:35

| Malaysia | 1–6 | India |
|---|---|---|
| Shahril 46' | Report | Thimmaiah 3'; Harjeet 7'; Ramandeep 25', 39'; Mujtaba 27'; Talwinder 50' |

Umpires:
Peter Wright (RSA)
Deric Leung (CAN)

=== Classification ===
==== Fifth and sixth place ====
16 April 2016
15:40

| Pakistan | 3–1 | Canada |
|---|---|---|
| Ahmed 11'; Ahmad 27'; Arshad 57' | Report | Smythe 51' |

Umpires:
Michihiko Watanabe (JPN)
Lim Hong Zhen (SIN)

==== Third and fourth place ====
16 April 2016
18:05

| New Zealand | 3–3 | Malaysia |
|---|---|---|
| Phillips 27'; Russell 43', 59' | Report | Ramadan 7'; Fitri 11'; Shahril 3' |
Penalties
| Inglis (penalty shoot-out scored); Wilson (penalty shoot-out scored); Neal (penalty shoot-out scored); Coughlan (penalty shoot-out scored); Muir (penalty shoot-out scored) | 5–4 | (penalty shoot-out scored) Firhan; (penalty shoot-out scored) Faiz; (penalty shoot-out scored) Shahril; (penalty shoot-out scored) Haziq; (penalty shoot-out missed) Fitri |

Umpires:
Murray Grime (AUS)
Javed Shaikh (IND)

==== Final ====
16 April 2016
20:45

| Australia | 4–0 | India |
|---|---|---|
| Craig 25', 35'; Gohdes 43', 57' | Report |

Umpires:
Simon Taylor (NZL)
Peter Wright (RSA)

== Final standings ==
| Pos | Team | Pld | W | D | L | GF | GA | GD | Pts | Final Result |
|---|---|---|---|---|---|---|---|---|---|---|
| 1st place, gold medalist(s) | Australia | 7 | 7 | 0 | 0 | 25 | 3 | +22 | 21 | Gold Medal |
| 2nd place, silver medalist(s) | India | 7 | 4 | 0 | 3 | 18 | 15 | +3 | 12 | Silver Medal |
| 3rd place, bronze medalist(s) | New Zealand | 7 | 3 | 3 | 1 | 18 | 13 | +5 | 12 | Bronze Medal |
| 4 | Malaysia (H) | 7 | 2 | 3 | 2 | 15 | 22 | −7 | 9 | |
| 5 | Pakistan | 7 | 3 | 0 | 4 | 14 | 18 | −4 | 9 | |
| 6 | Canada | 7 | 1 | 2 | 4 | 9 | 16 | −7 | 5 | |
| 7 | Japan | 6 | 0 | 0 | 6 | 8 | 20 | −12 | 0 | |

Source: FIH
(H) Hosts

== Goalscorers ==
There were 107 goals scored in 24 matches, for an average of 4.46 goals per match.

6 goals

- (Pakistan) Arslan Qadir

5 goals

- (Malaysia) Razie Rahim

4 goals

- (Australia) Thomas Craig
- (Australia) Jamie Dwyer
- (Australia) Matthew Gohdes
- (Australia) Blake Govers
- (Malaysia) Shahril Saabah
- (New Zealand) Nicholas Wilson
- (New Zealand) Nicholas Woods
- (New Zealand) Kane Russell

3 goals

- (Australia) Flynn Ogilvie
- (India) Talwinder Singh
- (Japan) Shota Yamada
- (New Zealand) Simon Child

2 goals

- (Australia) Jacob Whetton
- (Canada) Scott Tupper
- (India) Harmanpreet Singh
- (India) Ramandeep Singh
- (India) Rupinder Pal Singh
- (India) Somwarpet V. Sunil
- (India) Chandanda Thimmaiah
- (Japan) Hiroki Sakamoto
- (Malaysia) Fitri Saari
- (Pakistan) Muhammad Arshad
- (Pakistan) Muhammad Irfan

1 goal

- (Australia) Mark Knowles
- (Australia) Edward Ockenden
- (Australia) Simon Orchard
- (Australia) Aran Zalewski
- (Canada) Matthew Guest
- (Canada) Richard Hildreth
- (Canada) Gabriel Ho-Garcia
- (Canada) Gordon Johnston
- (Canada) Mark Pearson
- (Canada) Keegan Pereira
- (Canada) Iain Smythe
- (India) Danish Mujtaba
- (India) Harjeet Singh
- (India) Mandeep Singh
- (India) Manpreet Singh
- (India) Sardara Singh
- (Japan) Kentaro Fukuda
- (Japan) Kenji Kitazato
- (Japan) Kazuma Murata
- (Malaysia) Firhan Ashaari
- (Malaysia) Nabil Noor
- (Malaysia) Ramadan Rosli
- (Malaysia) Haziq Samsul
- (New Zealand) Hugo Inglis
- (New Zealand) Stephen Jenness
- (New Zealand) Hayden Phillips
- (Pakistan) Rizwan Ali
- (Pakistan) Fareed Ahmed
- (Pakistan) Ajaz Ahmad
- (Pakistan) Ali Shan

Source: FIH
