= 2016 Men's Asian Champions Trophy =

Field hockey competition

Tournament details
- Host country: Malaysia
- City: Kuantan
- Dates: 20–30 October
- Teams: 6 (from 1 confederation)
- Venue: Wisma Belia Hockey Stadium

Final positions
- Champions: India (2nd title)
- Runner-up: Pakistan
- Third place: Malaysia

Tournament statistics
- Matches played: 20
- Goals scored: 104 (5.2 per match)
- Top scorer: (India) Rupinder Pal Singh (11 goals)

The 2016 Men's Asian Champions Trophy was the fourth edition of the Men's Asian Champions Trophy. The tournament was held in Kuantan, Pahang, Malaysia from 20 to 30 October 2016.

India defeated the defending champions Pakistan 3–2 in the final to win the trophy for the second time.

== Teams ==
Team	Appearance	Last appearance	Previous best performance
China	4th	2013	4th (2012, 2013)
India	4th	2013	1st (2011)
Japan	4th	2013	4th (2011)
Malaysia	4th	2013	3rd (2011, 2012, 2013)
Pakistan	4th	2013	1st (2012, 2013)
South Korea	2nd	2011	5th (2011)

== Umpires ==
Eight umpires were selected to officiate at the tournament:

Neutral Umpires

- Murray Grime (AUS)
- Peter Wright (RSA)

National Umpires

- Rawi Anbananthan (MAS)
- Ilanggo Kanabathu (MAS)
- Raghu Prasad (IND)
- Haider Rasool (PAK)
- Shin Dong-yoon (KOR)
- You Suolong (CHN)

== Results ==
All times are Malaysia Standard Time (UTC+08:00)

=== Round robin ===
Pos	Team	Pld	W	D	L	GF	GA	GD	Pts	Qualification
1	India	5	4	1	0	25	6	+19	13	Semi-finals
2	Malaysia (H)	5	3	1	1	18	8	+10	10	Semi-finals
3	Pakistan	5	3	0	2	13	10	+3	9	Semi-finals
4	South Korea	5	2	2	1	11	9	+2	8	Semi-finals
5	China	5	1	0	4	6	24	−18	3	Fifth place game
6	Japan	5	0	0	5	11	27	−16	0	Fifth place game

Source: FIH
(H) Hosts

20 October 2016
18:30

Malaysia	4–2	Pakistan
Firhan 13'; Fitri 37', 60'; Shahril 41'	Report	Bilal 18', 34'

Umpires:
Murray Grime (AUS)
You Suolong (CHN)

20 October 2016
20:30

India	10–2	Japan
Ramandeep 2'; Rupinder 9', 12', 17', 22', 46', 47'; Talwinder 19'; Affan 50'	Report	K. Tanaka 23'; Ochiai 38'

Umpires:
Ilanggo Kanabathu (MAS)
Haider Rasool (PAK)

21 October 2016
18:30

Pakistan	1–0	South Korea
Khan 60'	Report

Umpires:
Murray Grime (AUS)
Rawi Anbananthan (MAS)

21 October 2016
20:30

Malaysia	5–1	China
Haziq 6', 20'; Fitri 22'; Shahril 37'; Firhan 54'	Report	Wang B. 33'

Umpires:
Raghu Prasad (IND)
Yoon Shin Dong (KOR)

22 October 2016
18:30

India	1–1	South Korea
Lalit 33'	Report	Jeong 11'

Umpires:
Peter Wright (RSA)
Rawi Anbananthan (MAS)

22 October 2016
20:30

China	2–1	Japan
Yu 19'; Haung 37'	Report	Zendana 43'

Umpires:
Raghu Prasad (IND)
Shin Dong Yoon (KOR)

23 October 2016
18:30

India	3–2	Pakistan
Pardeep 22'; Rupinder 43'; Ramandeep 44'	Report	Rizwan Sr. 31'; Irfan 39'

Umpires:
Murray Grime (AUS)
Peter Wright (RSA)

23 October 2016
20:30

Malaysia	7–2	Japan
Amain 23'; Rashid 27'; Nabil 33'; Faizal 37', 59'; Firhan 44'; Faizal 58'	Report	Kitazato 59'; K. Tanaka 60'

Umpires:
Suolong You (CHN)
Raghu Prasad (IND)

24 October 2016
18:30

South Korea	5–3	China
Lee J. 1'; Kim Se. 3'; Kim H. 15'; Yang 20'; Kim J. 38'	Report	Yu 6'; Meng 43'; E Wenh. 55'

Umpires:
Haider Rasool (PAK)
Ilanggo Kanabathu (MAS)

25 October 2016
18:30

Pakistan	4–3	Japan
Irfan 5'; Bilal 12', 52'; Rizwan Sr. 36'	Report	S. Tanaka 10'; K. Tanaka 30'; Zendana 54'

Umpires:
Rawi Anbananthan (MAS)
Shin Dong-yun (KOR)

25 October 2016
20:30

India	9–0	China
Akashdeep 9', 39'; Affan 19', 40'; Jasjit 22', 51'; Rupinder 25'; Nikkin 34'; Lalit 37'	Report

Umpires:
Ilanggo Kanabathu (MAS)
Peter Wright (RSA)

26 October 2016
18:30

South Korea	4–3	Japan
Kim J. 4'; Jung 32', 49'; Kim Se. 46'	Report	Murata 8'; Hiroki 44'; K. Tanaka 45'

Umpires:
Peter Wright (RSA)
Rawi Anbanathan (MAS)

26 October 2016
20:30

Malaysia	1–2	India
Razie 18'	Report	Rupinder Pal 12', 58'

Umpires:
Murray Grime (AUS)
Haider Rasool (PAK)

27 October 2016
18:30

Pakistan	4–0	China
Kahan 21', 31'; Shan 48'; Irfan 48'	Report

Umpires:
Raghu Prasad (IND)
Ilanggo Kanabathu (MAS)

27 October 2016
20:30

South Korea	1–1	Malaysia
Jeong 37'	Report	Razie 56'

Umpires:
Peter Wright (RSA)
You Suolong (CHN)

=== Fifth to sixth place classification ===
29 October 2016
16:00

China	4–3	Japan
Meng 17', 49'; Yu 20'; Zhong 23'	Report	Ochiai 8'; K. Tanaka 24', 48'

Umpires:
Shin Dong-yoon (KOR)
Haider Rasool (PAK)

=== First to fourth place classification ===
Semi-finals
29 October
India (p.s.o.)	2 (5)
South Korea	2 (4)
29 October
Malaysia	1 (2)
Pakistan (p.s.o.)	1 (3)

Final
30 October
India	3
Pakistan	2
Third Place
30 October
South Korea	1 (1)
Malaysia (p.s.o.)	1 (3)

==== Semi-finals ====
29 October 2016
18:15

India	2–2	South Korea
Talwinder 15'; Ramandeep 55'	Report	Seo In-woo 21'; Yang Ji-hun 53'
Penalties
Sardar (penalty shoot-out scored); Ramandeep (penalty shoot-out scored); Rupinder (penalty shoot-out scored); Akashdeep (penalty shoot-out scored); Birendra (penalty shoot-out scored)	5–4	(penalty shoot-out scored) Jung Man-jae; (penalty shoot-out scored) Kim Hyeong-jin; (penalty shoot-out scored) Lee Jung-jun; (penalty shoot-out scored) Bae Jong-suk; (penalty shoot-out missed) Lee Dae-yeol

Umpires:
Murray Grime (AUS)
Ilanggo Kanabathu (MAS)

29 October 2016
20:30

Malaysia	1–1	Pakistan
Shahril 18'	Report	Khan 34'
Penalties
Firhan (penalty shoot-out scored); Faizal (penalty shoot-out scored); Jali (penalty shoot-out missed); Shahril (penalty shoot-out missed); Fitri (penalty shoot-out missed)	2–3	(penalty shoot-out scored) Khan; (penalty shoot-out missed) Rizwan Sr. (penalty shoot-out scored) Irfan; (penalty shoot-out scored) Qadir

Umpires:
Raghu Prasad (IND)
Peter Wright (RSA)

==== Third place game ====
30 October 2016
18:15

South Korea	1–1	Malaysia
Jung Man-jae 17'	Report	Shahril 14'
Penalties
Jung Man-jae (penalty shoot-out missed); Kim Hyeong-jin (penalty shoot-out missed); Kang Moon-kyu (penalty shoot-out scored); Jeong Jun-woo (penalty shoot-out missed)	1–3	(penalty shoot-out scored) Firhan; (penalty shoot-out scored) Faizal; (penalty shoot-out scored) Nabil

Umpires:
You Suolong (CHN)
Haider Rasool (PAK)

==== Final ====
30 October 2016
20:30

India	3–2	Pakistan
Rupinder 18'; Affan 23'; Nikkin 51'	Report	Bilal 26'; Shan 38'

Umpires:
Murray Grime (AUS)
Peter Wright (RSA)

== Final standings ==
1. India
2. Pakistan
3. Malaysia
4. South Korea
5. China
6. Japan

== See also ==
- 2016 Women's Asian Champions Trophy
