= 2018 Men's Asian Champions Trophy =

Field hockey tournament

Men's Hero Asian Champions Trophy 2018

Tournament details
- Host country: Oman
- City: Muscat
- Dates: 18–28 October
- Teams: 6 (from 1 confederation)
- Venue: Sultan Qaboos Sports Complex

Final positions
- Champions: India & Pakistan (3rd title)
- Third place: Malaysia

Tournament statistics
- Matches played: 19
- Goals scored: 92 (4.84 per match)
- Top scorer: (Malaysia) Faizal Saari (8 goals)
- Best player: (India) Akashdeep Singh

The Hero Asian Champions Trophy 2018 was held at Muscat, Oman between October 18–28, 2018. It was the fifth edition of the Asian Hockey Champions Trophy, a field hockey tournament for the six best Asian national teams. This was announced by the Asian Hockey Federation (AHF) on 29 January 2018. The Oman Hockey Association hosted the tournament.

The 5th edition of the biennial event took place at the Sultan Qaboos Sports Complex in Muscat, Sultanate of Oman. The tournament featured host nation Oman, Pakistan, Malaysia, India, South Korea, and Japan.

Hero MotoCorp, a global partner of the International Hockey Federation (FIH) and a long-term associate of the Asian Hockey Federation (AHF), were the title sponsor of the tournament.

India and Pakistan were declared joint winners by virtue of forfeiture of the final due to persistent rain. Malaysia finished at the 3rd place after defeating Japan 3-2 in the penalty shootouts in the bronze medal match. Malaysia's Faizal Saari was the top scorer of the tournament with 8 Goals. India remained the only undefeated team in the tournament.

== Umpires ==
A total of nine umpires were appointed by the FIH and National Association to officiate the tournament.

- Anand (IND)
- Bruce Bale (ENG)
- Dong Yoon Shin (KOR)
- Jakub Mejzlik (CZE)
- Kamran Hussain (PAK)
- Khalil Al Balushi (OMA)
- Michihiko Watanabe (JPN)
- Nazmi Kamaruddin (MAS)
- Peter Wright (RSA)

== Results ==
All times are Gulf Standard Time (UTC+04:00)

=== Round robin ===
Pos	Team	Pld	W	D	L	GF	GA	GD	Pts	Qualification
1	India	5	4	1	0	27	2	+25	13	Semi-finals
2	Pakistan	5	3	1	1	14	6	+8	10	Semi-finals
3	Malaysia	5	3	1	1	10	4	+6	10	Semi-finals
4	Japan	5	2	1	2	8	13	−5	7	Semi-finals
5	South Korea	5	1	0	4	8	15	−7	3	Fifth place game
6	Oman (H)	5	0	0	5	4	31	−27	0	Fifth place game

Source: FIH
(H) Hosts

18 October 2018
18:55

Malaysia	3–0	Japan
Faizal 3', 51'; Tengku 9'	Report

Umpires:
Jakub Mejzlik (CZE)
Kamran Hussain (PAK)

18 October 2018
21:10

India	11–0	Oman
Lalit 17'; Harmanpreet 22'; Nilakanta 23'; Mandeep 30'; Gurjant 37'; Dilpreet 41', 55', 57'; Akashdeep 48'; Varun 49'; Chinglensana 53'	Report

Umpires:
Peter Wright (RSA)
Shin Dong Yoon (KOR)

19 October 2018
18:55

Pakistan	3–1	South Korea
Ahmad 12'; Bhutta 18'; Rizwan Jr. 42'	Report	Kim Hyeong-jin 51'

Umpires:
Bruce Bale (ENG)
Nazmi Kamaruddin (MAS)

19 October 2018
21:10

Oman	1–3	Malaysia
Al Fazari 34'	Report	Firhan 26'; Tengku 46'; Faizal 48'

Umpires:
Michihiko Watanabe (JPN)
Anand (IND)

20 October 2018
18:55

South Korea	0–2	Japan
	Report	Yamada 18'; Matsumoto 51'

Umpires:
Jakub Mejzlik (CZE)
Khalil Al Balushi (OMA)

20 October 2018
21:10

Pakistan	1–3	India
Irfan Jr. 1'	Report	Manpreet 24'; Mandeep 31'; Dilpreet 42'

Umpires:
Peter Wright (RSA)
Bruce Bale (ENG)

21 October 2018
21:10

India	9–0	Japan
Mandeep 4', 49', 57'; Gurjant 8'; Harmanpreet 17', 21'; Akashdeep 36'; Sumit 42'; Lalit 45'	Report

Umpires:
Nazmi Kamaruddin (MAS)
Jakub Mejzlik (CZE)

22 October 2018
18:55

Malaysia	4–2	South Korea
Firhan 11'; Shahril 22'; Tengku 35'; Faizal 57'	Report	Yang Ji-hun 15'; Jang Jong-hyun 20'

Umpires:
Khalil Al Balushi (OMA)
Bruce Bale (ENG)

22 October 2018
21:10

Oman	1–8	Pakistan
Al Lawati 60'	Report	Bilal 13', 18', 39'; Irfan Jr. 22'; Butt 26'; Irfan 34'; Mahmood 45'; Atiq 52'

Umpires:
Anand (IND)
Shin Dong Yoon (KOR)

23 October 2018
18:55

South Korea	4–2	Oman
Hwang Tae-il 7'; Cho Suk-hoon 47'; Yang Ji-hun 51'; Jang Jong-hyun 59'	Report	Al Saadi 6'; Al Lawati 36'

Umpires:
Kamran Hussain (PAK)
Nazmi Kamaruddin (MAS)

23 October 2018
21:10

Malaysia	0–0	India
	Report

Umpires:
Michihiko Watanabe (JPN)
Peter Wright (RSA)

24 October 2018
18:55

Japan	1–1	Pakistan
Kitazato 12'	Report	Ali 25'

Umpires:
Nazmi Kamaruddin (MAS)
Bruce Bale (ENG)

24 October 2018
21:10

India	4–1	South Korea
Harmanpreet 5', 47', 59'; Gurjant 10'	Report	Lee Seung-il 20'

Umpires:
Michihiko Watanabe (JPN)
Khalil Al Balushi (OMA)

25 October 2018
18:55

Pakistan	1–0	Malaysia
Irfan Jr. 53'	Report

Umpires:
Michihiko Watanabe (JPN)
Jakub Mejzlik (CZE)

25 October 2018
21:10

Japan	5–0	Oman
Yamasaki 14'; W. Matsumoto 33'; K. Matsumoto 38'; Ochiai 45'; Zendana 45'	Report

Umpires:
Peter Wright (RSA)
Anand (IND)

=== Fifth place game ===
27 October 2018
16:40

South Korea	3–1	Oman
Hwang Tae-il 14'; Cho Suk-hoon 53'; Yang Ji-hun 55'	Report	Al Nofali 15'

Umpires:
Anand (IND)
Kamran Hussain (PAK)

=== First to fourth place classification ===
Semi-finals
27 October
Pakistan (p.s.o.)	4 (3)
Malaysia	4 (1)
27 October
India	3
Japan	2

Final
28 October
Pakistan	0
India	0
Third place
28 October
Malaysia (p.s.o.)	2 (3)
Japan	2 (2)

==== Semi-finals ====
27 October 2018
18:55

Pakistan	4–4	Malaysia
Irfan Jr. 6'; Bilal 12', 20'; Mahmood 15'	Report	Faizal 2', 56'; Tengku 43'; Aiman 44'
Penalties
Arshad (penalty shoot-out scored); Mahmood (penalty shoot-out scored); Ahmad (penalty shoot-out missed); Irfan Jr. (penalty shoot-out missed); A. Butt (penalty shoot-out scored)	3–1	(penalty shoot-out missed) Ashari; (penalty shoot-out missed) Faizal; (penalty shoot-out scored) Aiman; (penalty shoot-out missed) Shahril

Umpires:
Jakub Mejzlik (CZE)
Bruce Bale (ENG)

27 October 2018
21:10

India	3–2	Japan
Gurjant 19'; Chinglensana 44'; Dilpreet 55'	Report	H. Wakuri 22'; Zendana 56'

Umpires:
Peter Wright (RSA)
Nazmi Kamaruddin (MAS)

==== Third place game ====
28 October 2018
18:55

Malaysia	2–2	Japan
Faizal 20', 51'	Report	Kitazato 18'; H. Wakuri 48'
Penalties
Aiman (penalty shoot-out scored); Sumantri (penalty shoot-out scored); Jalil (penalty shoot-out missed); Cholan (penalty shoot-out missed); Tengku (penalty shoot-out scored)	3–2	(penalty shoot-out missed) Yamasaki; (penalty shoot-out missed) S. Tanaka; (penalty shoot-out scored) Ochiai; (penalty shoot-out scored) H. Wakuri; (penalty shoot-out missed) Matsumoto

Umpires:
Brace Bale(ENG)
Peter Wright(RSA)

==== Final ====
28 October 2018
21:10

India	match f.o. due to heavy rain	Pakistan
	Report

Umpires:
Nazmi Kamaruddin (MAS)
Jakub Mejzlik (CZE)

== Statistics ==
=== Final standings ===
Rank	Team
Gold medal	India
Gold medal	Pakistan
Bronze medal	Malaysia
4	Japan
5	South Korea
6	Oman

=== Awards ===
The following individual awards were given at the conclusion of the tournament.

Player of the tournament	Best Goalkeeper of the Tournament	Highest Scorer of the Tournament	Emerging Player of the Tournament
(India) Akashdeep Singh	(India) P. R. Sreejesh	(Malaysia) Faizal Saari	(Pakistan) Abu Bakkar Mahmood

=== Goalscorers ===
There were 92 goals scored in 19 matches, for an average of 4.84 goals per match.

8 goals

- (Malaysia) Faizal Saari

6 goals

- (India) Harmanpreet Singh

5 goals

- (India) Dilpreet Singh
- (India) Mandeep Singh
- (Pakistan) Aleem Bilal

4 goals

- (India) Gurjant Singh
- (Malaysia) Tengku Ahmad Tajudin
- (Pakistan) Muhammad Irfan Jr.

3 goals

- (South Korea) Yang Ji-hun

2 goals

- (India) Akashdeep Singh
- (India) Chinglensana Kangujam
- (India) Lalit Upadhyay
- (Japan) Hirotaka Wakuri
- (Japan) Hirotaka Zendana
- (Japan) Kenji Kitazato
- (Japan) Wataru Matsumoto
- (Malaysia) Firhan Ashaari
- (Oman) Mohammed Al Lawati
- (Pakistan) Abu Mahmood
- (South Korea) Cho Suk-hoon
- (South Korea) Hwang Tae-il
- (South Korea) Jang Jong-hyun

1 goal

- (India) Manpreet Singh
- (India) Nilakanta Sharma
- (India) Sumit
- (India) Varun Kumar
- (Japan) Hiromasa Ochiai
- (Japan) Kazumasa Matsumoto
- (Japan) Koji Yamasaki
- (Japan) Shota Yamada
- (Malaysia) Aiman Nik Rozemi
- (Malaysia) Shahril Saabah
- (Oman) Ahmed Al Nofali
- (Oman) Rashad Al Fazari
- (Oman) Salah Al Saadi
- (Pakistan) Ajaz Ahmad
- (Pakistan) Ammad Butt
- (Pakistan) Mubashar Ali
- (Pakistan) Muhammad Atiq
- (Pakistan) Muhammad Irfan
- (Pakistan) Muhammad Rizwan Jr.
- (Pakistan) Umar Bhutta
- (South Korea) Kim Hyeong-jin
- (South Korea) Lee Seung-Il

Source: FIH

== See also ==
- Field hockey at the 2018 Asian Games – Men's tournament
- 2018 Women's Asian Champions Trophy
