= Field hockey at the 2010 Summer Youth Olympics – Boys' tournament =

2010 Summer Youth Olympics
Tournament details
- Host country: Singapore
- City: Singapore
- Dates: 16–24 August
- Teams: 6
- Venue: Sengkang Hockey Stadium

Final positions
- Champions: Australia (1st title)
- Runner-up: Pakistan
- Third place: Belgium

Tournament statistics
- Matches played: 18
- Goals scored: 131 (7.28 per match)
- Top scorer(s): (Belgium) Alexander Hendrickx (Pakistan) Arslan Qadir (10 goals)

Field hockey at the 2010 Summer Youth Olympics was held at the Sengkang Hockey Stadium in Singapore. Australia won the gold medal by defeating Pakistan in the final.

== Medalists ==
Gold	Silver	Bronze
Australia	Pakistan	Belgium

== Round-robin ==
Pos	Team	Pld	W	D	L	GF	GA	GD	Pts	Qualification
1	Australia	5	5	0	0	36	6	+30	15	Gold medal match
2	Pakistan	5	4	0	1	30	12	+18	12	Gold medal match
3	Belgium	5	3	0	2	27	13	+14	9	Bronze medal match
4	Ghana	5	2	0	3	12	24	−12	6	Bronze medal match
5	Chile	5	1	0	4	6	38	−32	3	
6	Singapore	5	0	0	5	5	23	−18	0	

Source: FIH
Rules for classification: 1) points; 2) goal difference; 3) goals scored; 4) head-to-head result.

17 August 2010
16:00

Pakistan	6–3	Ghana
Zubair 6'; Shah 14'; Qadir 21', 49', 63'; Suleman 60'	Report	Anum 19'; Ntiamoah 35'; Afari 58'

Umpires:
Lim Hong Zhen (SIN)
Mikael Mattsson (SWE)

17 August 2010
18:00

Belgium	9–0	Chile
Devreker 2', 47', 69'; Cuvelier 6', 28'; Hendrickx 34'; De Kerpel 54'; Cobbaert 56'; Perez 57'	Report

Umpires:
David Tomlinson (NZL)
Aziz Adimah (GHA)

17 August 2010
20:30

Singapore	1–8	Australia
Salim 65'	Report	Wookey 8', 30', 32'; Beale 21'; Mathiesen 29'; Farrel 37'; Willott 41'; Wotherspoon 60'

Umpires:
Fernando Gomez (ARG)
David Sweetman (GBR)

18 August 2010
16:30

Pakistan	15–1	Chile
Shah 8', 55', 58'; Umair 17', 44'; Zubair 21'; Suleman 25', 28', 39', 46', 47'; Rizwan 44'; Qadir 49', 64', 67'	Report	Martín 65'

Umpires:
Muhammad Faisal Buin Hussin (SIN)
Mikael Mattsson (SWE)

18 August 2010
18:30

Australia	8–0	Ghana
Beale 1', 48'; Willott 14'; Wookey 17', 25'; Noblett 20'; Hammond 39'; Edge 46'	Report

Umpires:
Anwaar Chaudhry Hussain (PAK)
Grant Hundley (USA)

18 August 2010
20:30

Singapore	1–7	Belgium
Abdul Jalil 42'	Report	Devreker 7', 19', 47', 65'; De Kerpel 23'; Perez 66'; Cuvelier 70'

Umpires:
Fernando Gomez (ARG)
Aziz Adimah (GHA)

20 August 2010
16:00

Australia	6–3	Belgium
Middleton 12'; Hayward 28'; Noblett 58', 67'; Willott 60'; Beale 63'	Report	Hendrickx 16', 44' van Dam 25'

Umpires:
Lim Hong Zhen (SIN)
David Sweetman (GBR)

20 August 2010
18:30

Chile	3–4	Ghana
Martín 22'; Hamilton 48'; Purcell 63'	Report	Damalie 15'; Darko 21'; Anum 24'; Ntiamoah 35'

Umpires:
David Tomlinson (NZL)
Muhammad Faisal Buin Hussin (SIN)

20 August 2010
20:30

Singapore	1–4	Pakistan
Salim 26'	Report	Zubair 32'; Qadir 39'; Suleman 49'; Rizwan 63'

Umpires:
Grant Hundley (USA)
Aziz Adimah (GHA)

21 August 2010
16:30

Ghana	3–6	Belgium
Ntiamoah 28'; Botsio 51'; Kemevor 54'	Report	Hendrickx 16', 31', 44', 69'; Devreker 49'; Rombouts 65'

Umpires:
Mikael Mattsson (SWE)
David Tomlinson (NZL)

21 August 2010
18:30

Pakistan	2–5	Australia
Qadir 9'; Rizwan 52'	Report	Middleton 20', 51'; Beale 29'; Mathiesen 42'; Wookey 46'

Umpires:
Fernando Gomez (ARG)
Lim Hong Zhen (SIN)

21 August 2010
20:30

Singapore	1–2	Chile
Salim 51'	Report	Mardones 14'; Tapia 32'

Umpires:
Muhammad Faisal Buin Hussin (SIN)
David Sweetman (GBR)

23 August 2010
16:00

Australia	9–0	Chile
Beale 6'; Wookey 9' 53', 65'; Ogilvie 10', 27'; Hammond 42'; Middleton 46', 49'	Report

Umpires:
Grant Hundley (USA)
Muhammad Faisal Buin Hussin (SIN)

23 August 2010
18:00

Belgium	2–3	Pakistan
Hendrickx 29', 47'	Report	Irfan 15'; Qadir 36', 58'

Umpires:
David Tomlinson (NZL)
Fernando Gomez (ARG)

23 August 2010
20:00

Ghana	2–1	Singapore
Kemevor 35'; Anum 44'	Report	Halim 59'

Umpires:
David Tomlinson (NZL)
Mikael Mattsson (SWE)

=== Classification matches ===
==== Fifth place match ====
25 August 2010
15:00

Chile	1–6	Singapore
Martín 13'	Report	Rizaini 19'; Salim 43', 48', 61'; Zulkepli 53', 69'

Umpires:
Aziz Adimah (GHA)
Mikael Mattsson (SWE)

== Bronze-medal match ==
25 August 2010
17:30

(bronze) Belgium	4–1	Ghana
Hendrickx 25'; Perez 31', 53'; Rombouts 48'	Report	Anum 17'

Umpires:
David Tomlinson (NZL)
Lim Hong Zhen (SIN)

== Gold-medal match ==
25 August 2010
20:00

(gold) Australia	2–1	Pakistan (silver)
Wotherspoon 49'; Noblett 67'	Report	Umair 10'

Umpires:
Fernando Gomez (ARG)
David Sweetman (GBR)

== Goalscorers ==
There have been 131 goals scored in 18 matches, for an average of 7.28 goals per match.

10 goals

- (Belgium) Alexander Hendrickx
- (Pakistan) Arslan Qadir

9 goals

- (Australia) Oscar Wookey

8 goals

- (Belgium) Arno Devreker

7 goals

- (Pakistan) Muhammad Suleman
- (Singapore) Muhammad Salim

6 goals

- (Australia) Daniel Beale

5 goals

- (Australia) Rory Middleton

4 goals

- (Australia) Luke Noblett
- (Belgium) Gaetan Perez
- (Ghana) Abdul Anum
- (Pakistan) Syed Shah

3 goals

- (Australia) Jordon Willott
- (Belgium) Dimitri Cuvelier
- (Chile) Vicente Martín
- (Ghana) Alfred Ntiamoah
- (Pakistan) Muhammad Rizwan
- (Pakistan) Muhammad Umair
- (Pakistan) Ahmed Zubair

2 goals

- (Australia) Casey Hammond
- (Australia) Daniel Mathiesen
- (Australia) Flynn Ogilvie
- (Australia) Dylan Wotherspoon
- (Belgium) Louis Rombouts
- (Belgium) Nicolas De Kerpel
- (Ghana) Selorm Kemevor
- (Singapore) Ashriq Zul'kepli

1 goal

- (Australia) Ryan Edge
- (Australia) Jake Farrell
- (Australia) Jeremy Hayward
- (Belgium) Mathew Cobbaert
- (Belgium) Benjamin van Dam
- (Chile) Alan Hamilton
- (Chile) Matias Mardones
- (Chile) Juan Purcell
- (Chile) Esteban Tapia
- (Ghana) Samuel Afari
- (Ghana) Johnny Botsio
- (Ghana) Matthew Damalie
- (Ghana) Fredrick Darko
- (Pakistan) Irfan Muhammad
- (Singapore) Rahmat Abdul
- (Singapore) Muhd Muhd

Source: FIH
