= 2019 Men's FIH Olympic Qualifiers =

Field hockey competition

Tournament details
- Dates: 25 October – 3 November
- Teams: 14 (from 4 confederations)
- Venue(s): 7 (in 7 host cities)

Tournament statistics
- Matches played: 14
- Goals scored: 85 (6.07 per match)
- Top scorer(s): (United Kingdom) Alan Forsyth (Netherlands) Mink van der Weerden (4 goals)

The 2019 Men's FIH Olympic Qualifiers was the final stage of the qualification for the men's field hockey event at the 2020 Summer Olympics. It was held in October and November 2019.

== Format ==
In the first part of the qualification, the five continental champions automatically gained an Olympic berth, where they were joined by the hosts, Japan. Originally, twelve teams were to take part in the Olympic qualifying events. These teams were to be drawn into six pairs; each pair playing a two-match, aggregate score series, and the winner of each series qualifying for the Olympics. As Japan won the 2018 Asian Games (thereby qualifying twice, once as host and once as Asian champions), there instead were 14 teams, seven of whom qualified. The seven Olympic qualifiers each featured two nations playing two back-to-back matches, with nations drawn to play each other based on their rankings at the end of the 2018 / 2019 Continental Championships. It was held in October and November 2019 and the matches were hosted by the higher-ranked of the two competing nations.

== Qualification ==
The participating teams were confirmed on 29 August 2019 by the International Hockey Federation.

Dates	Event(s)	Location	Quota	Qualifier(s)
19 January – 30 June 2019	2019 FIH Pro League		2	~~Australia~~ (Note: Australia, Belgium, and South Africa already qualified directly for the 2020 Summer Olympics by winning their continental championship so they were replaced by the highest ranked teams not already qualified.); ~~Belgium~~; Great Britain; Netherlands
26 April – 4 May 2019	2018–19 FIH Series Finals	Kuala Lumpur, Malaysia	2	Canada; Malaysia
6–15 June 2019	2018–19 FIH Series Finals	Bhubaneswar, India	1	India; ~~South Africa~~
15–23 June 2019	2018–19 FIH Series Finals	Le Touquet, France	2	France; Ireland
8 September 2019	FIH World Rankings		7	Austria; ~~Egypt~~ (Note: Egypt withdrew and was replaced by Russia.); Germany; New Zealand; Pakistan; Russia; South Korea; Spain
Total			14	

== Seeding ==
The seeding was announced on 8 September 2019.

Pot 1 (Host teams)
Team	Rank
Netherlands	3
India	5
Germany	6

Pot 2 (Host teams)
Team	Rank
Great Britain	7
Spain	8
New Zealand	9
Canada	10

Pot 3 (Away teams)
Team	Rank
Malaysia	11
France	12
Ireland	13
South Korea	16

Pot 4 (Away teams)
Team	Rank
Pakistan	17
Austria	20
Russia	22

== Overview ==
The first legs were played on 25 and 26 October or 1 and 2 November 2019, and the second legs on 26 and 27 October or 2 and 3 November 2019.

All times are local.

Team 1	Agg.	Team 2	1st leg	2nd leg
Spain	6–5	France	3–3	3–2
Netherlands	10–5	Pakistan	4–4	6–1
Canada	6–6 (5–4 p.s.o.)	Ireland	3–5	3–1
India	11–3	Russia	4–2	7–1
New Zealand	6–2	South Korea	3–2	3–0
Germany	10–3	Austria	5–0	5–3
Great Britain	9–3	Malaysia	4–1	5–2

=== Matches ===
25 October 2019
18:00

Spain	3–3	France
Lleonart 30'; Quemada 41', 50'	Report	Charlet 19'; Baumgarten 26'; Bellenger 30'

Estadio Betero, Valencia
Umpires:
Coen van Bunge (NED)
Raghu Prasad (IND)

26 October 2019
18:00

Spain	3–2	France
Delas 21'; Iglesias 28'; Lleonart 40'	Report	Baumgarten 3'; Goyet 39'

Estadio Betero, Valencia
Umpires:
Coen van Bunge (NED)
Raghu Prasad (IND)

Spain won 6–5 on aggregate.

26 October 2019
16:00

Netherlands	4–4	Pakistan
Van der Weerden 20', 60'; Kellerman 21'; Kemperman 52'	Report	M. Ali 5', 58'; Ghazanfar 25'; Rizwan Sr. 38'

Wagener Stadium, Amstelveen
Umpires:
Dan Barstow (ENG)
Sean Rapaport (RSA)

27 October 2019
16:00

Netherlands	6–1	Pakistan
Kellerman 9'; Van der Weerden 17', 29'; Pruyser 22'; Pieters 39'; Janssen 43'	Report	R. Ali 53'

Wagener Stadium, Amstelveen
Umpires:
Dan Barstow (ENG)
Jakub Mejzlík (CZE)

Netherlands won 10–5 on aggregate.

26 October 2019
14:00

Canada	3–5	Ireland
Johnston 15'; Pereira 23', 48'	Report	Cargo 8'; O'Donoghue 33', 53'; Murray 37', 51'

Ambleside Rutledge Field, West Vancouver
Umpires:
Ben Göntgen (GER)
Diego Barbas (ARG)

27 October 2019
14:00

Canada	3–1	Ireland
Johnston 21'; Scholfield 37'; Tupper 60+'	Report	McKee 6'
Penalties
Johnston (penalty shoot-out scored); S. Panesar (penalty shoot-out missed); Pereira (penalty shoot-out missed); Wallace (penalty shoot-out scored); Froese (penalty shoot-out scored); Johnston (penalty shoot-out scored); Froese (penalty shoot-out scored)	5–4	(penalty shoot-out scored) Magee; (penalty shoot-out scored) McKee; (penalty shoot-out scored) Caruth; (penalty shoot-out missed) Robson; (penalty shoot-out missed) O'Donoghue; (penalty shoot-out scored) Magee; (penalty shoot-out missed) McKee

Ambleside Rutledge Field, West Vancouver
Umpires:
Gareth Greenfield (NZL)
Ben Göntgen (GER)

6–6 on aggregate. Canada won 5–4 after penalty-shootout.

1 November 2019
20:00

India	4–2	Russia
Harmanpreet 5'; Mandeep 24', 53'; Sunil 48'	Report	Kuraev 17'; Matkovskiy 60'

Kalinga Stadium, Bhubaneswar
Umpires:
Lim Hong-Zhen (SGP)
Francisco Vázquez (ESP)

2 November 2019
20:00

India	7–1	Russia
Lalit 17'; Akashdeep 23', 29'; Nilakanta 47'; Rupinder 48', 59'; Amit 60+'	Report	Sobolevskiy 1'

Kalinga Stadium, Bhubaneswar
Umpires:
Lim Hong-Zhen (SGP)
Francisco Vázquez (ESP)

India won 11–3 on aggregate.

2 November 2019
15:00

New Zealand	3–2	South Korea
Jenness 3', 17'; Child 52'	Report	Lee N. 15'; Jang 33'

Taranaki Hockey Club, Stratford
Umpires:
Adam Kearns (AUS)
Javed Shaikh (IND)

3 November 2019
15:00

New Zealand	3–0	South Korea
Jenness 16'; Lane 23'; Russell 42'	Report

Taranaki Hockey Club, Stratford
Umpires:
Adam Kearns (AUS)
Germán Montes de Oca (ARG)

New Zealand won 6–2 on aggregate.

2 November 2019
18:30

Germany	5–0	Austria
Windfeder 11'; Staib 19'; Rühr 27'; Fuchs 42'; Oruz 49'	Report

Warsteiner HockeyPark, Mönchengladbach
Umpires:
Marcin Grochal (POL)
David Tomlinson (NZL)

3 November 2019
16:30

Germany	5–3	Austria
Grambusch 14'; Miltkau 15'; Staib 39'; Wellen 57'; Rühr 58'	Report	Körper 14', 40', 41'

Warsteiner HockeyPark, Mönchengladbach
Umpires:
David Tomlinson (NZL)
Marcin Grochal (POL)

Germany won 10–3 on aggregate.

2 November 2019
16:30

Great Britain	4–1	Malaysia
Ward 33'; Roper 36'; Forsyth 42'; Gall 47'	Report	Nabil 6'

Lee Valley Hockey and Tennis Centre, London
Umpires:
Christian Blasch (GER)
Peter Wright (RSA)

3 November 2019
15:00

Great Britain	5–2	Malaysia
Forsyth 9', 56', 57'; Ward 11', 31'	Report	Fitri 24'; Razie 40'

Lee Valley Hockey and Tennis Centre, London
Umpires:
Peter Wright (RSA)
Christian Blasch (GER)

Great Britain won 9–3 on aggregate.

== Goalscorers ==
There were 85 goals scored in 14 matches, for an average of 6.07 goals per match.

4 goals

- (United Kingdom) Alan Forsyth
- (Netherlands) Mink van der Weerden

3 goals

- (Austria) Michael Körper
- (United Kingdom) Samuel Ward
- (New Zealand) Stephen Jenness

2 goals

- (Canada) Gordon Johnston
- (Canada) Keegan Pereira
- (France) Gaspard Baumgarten
- (Germany) Christopher Rühr
- (India) Akashdeep Singh
- (India) Mandeep Singh
- (India) Rupinder Pal Singh
- (Ireland) Sean Murray
- (Ireland) Shane O'Donoghue
- (Netherlands) Bjorn Kellerman
- (Pakistan) Mubashar Ali
- (Spain) Xavi Lleonart
- (Spain) Pau Quemada

1 goal

- (Canada) Oliver Scholfield
- (Canada) Scott Tupper
- (France) Amaury Bellenger
- (France) Victor Charlet
- (France) François Goyet
- (Germany) Florian Fuchs
- (Germany) Timur Oruz
- (Germany) Constantin Staib
- (Germany) Niklas Wellen
- (Germany) Lukas Windfeder
- (United Kingdom) James Gall
- (United Kingdom) Phil Roper
- (India) Nilakanta Sharma
- (India) Harmanpreet Singh
- (India) S. V. Sunil
- (India) Lalit Upadhyay
- (India) Amit Rohidas
- (Ireland) Chris Cargo
- (Ireland) John McKee
- (Malaysia) Fitri Saari
- (Malaysia) Nabil Fiqri
- (Malaysia) Razie Rahim
- (Netherlands) Jip Janssen
- (Netherlands) Robbert Kemperman
- (Netherlands) Terrance Pieters
- (Netherlands) Mirco Pruyser
- (New Zealand) Simon Child
- (New Zealand) Sam Lane
- (New Zealand) Kane Russell
- (Pakistan) Rizwan Ali
- (Pakistan) Ali Ghazanfar
- (Pakistan) Muhammad Rizwan Sr.
- (Russia) Andrey Kuraev
- (Russia) Semen Matkovskiy
- (Russia) Alexey Sobolevskiy
- (South Korea) Jang Jong-hyun
- (South Korea) Lee Nam-yong
- (Spain) Miquel Delas
- (Spain) Álvaro Iglesias

Source: FIH

== See also ==
- 2019 Women's FIH Olympic Qualifiers
