= 2014 Men's Hockey Champions Trophy =

International men's field hockey tournament in Bhubaneswar, India

- Official logo

Tournament details
- Host country: India
- City: Bhubaneswar
- Dates: 6–14 December
- Teams: 8 (from 4 confederations)
- Venue: Kalinga Stadium

Final positions
- Champions: Germany (10th title)
- Runner-up: Pakistan
- Third place: Australia

Tournament statistics
- Matches played: 24
- Goals scored: 107 (4.46 per match)
- Top scorer(s): (Australia) Chris Ciriello (Germany) Florian Fuchs (Netherlands) Jeroen Hertzberger (Netherlands) Mink van der Weerden (Pakistan) Muhammad Irfan (4 goals)
- Best player: (Germany) Moritz Fürste

The 2014 Men's Hockey Champions Trophy was the 35th edition of the Hockey Champions Trophy, an international men's field hockey tournament organized by the International Hockey Federation. It was held between 6 and 14 December 2014 at the Kalinga Stadium in Bhubaneswar, India. From this year on the tournament began to be held biennially due to the introduction of the Hockey World League, returning to its original format changed in 1980.

Germany won the tournament for the tenth time after defeating Pakistan 2–0 in the final. The five-time defending champions Australia won the bronze medal by defeating the hosts India 2–1.

== Qualification ==
Alongside the host nation, the top five finishers from the previous edition and the winner of the 2012 Champions Challenge I qualified automatically. The remaining spots were nominated by the FIH Executive Board, making a total of 8 competing teams.

- India (Host nation, and fourth in the 2012 Champions Trophy)
- Australia (Defending champions)
- Netherlands (Second in 2012 Champions Trophy)
- Pakistan (Third in 2012 Champions Trophy)
- Belgium (Fifth in 2012 Champions Trophy)
- Argentina (Winner of 2012 Champions Challenge I)
- England (Nominated by FIH Executive Board)
- Germany (Nominated by FIH Executive Board)

== Umpires ==
Below are the 10 umpires appointed by the International Hockey Federation:

- Chen Dekang (CHN)
- Eduardo Lizana (ESP)
- Fernando Gómez (ARG)
- Gareth Greenfield (NZL)
- Andrew Kennedy (ENG)
- Deon Nel (RSA)
- Raghu Prasad (IND)
- Coen van Bunge (NED)
- Paco Vázquez (ESP)
- Peter Wright (RSA)

== Preliminary round ==
All times are Indian Standard Time (UTC+05:30)

=== Pool A ===
Pos	Team	Pld	W	D	L	GF	GA	GD	Pts	Qualification
1	England	3	2	1	0	12	4	+8	7	Quarter-finals
2	Belgium	3	1	2	0	7	6	+1	5	Quarter-finals
3	Australia	3	1	1	1	8	7	+1	4	Quarter-finals
4	Pakistan	3	0	0	3	3	13	−10	0	Quarter-finals

Source: FIH
Rules for classification: 1) points; 2) goal difference; 3) goals scored; 4) head-to-head result.

6 December 2014
12:00

Australia	1–3	England
Ciriello 54'	Report	Brogdon 6'; Ward 27', 56'

Umpires:
Deon Nel (RSA)
Eduardo Lizana (ESP)

6 December 2014
14:00

Belgium	2–1	Pakistan
Cosyns 12'; Briels 44'	Report	Imran 36'

Umpires:
Andrew Kennedy (ENG)
Paco Vázquez (ESP)

7 December 2014
12:00

Belgium	4–4	Australia
Dockier 25'; Van Aubel 30'; Dohmen 38'; Boon 60'	Report	Ciriello 16'; Ockenden 19'; Whetton 21'; Ogilvie 37'

Umpires:
Gareth Greenfield (NZL)
Raghu Prasad (IND)

7 December 2014
14:00

England	8–2	Pakistan
Gleghorne 15'; Catlin 17'; Condon 19'; Middleton 24'; Jackson 26'; Ward 45'; Brogdon 48'; Griffiths 59'	Report	Qadir 57'; Irfan 60'

Umpires:
Peter Wright (RSA)
Coen van Bunge (NED)

9 December 2014
14:00

England	1–1	Belgium
Lewers 48'	Report	Keusters 9'

Umpires:
Paco Vázquez (ESP)
Chen Dekang (CHN)

9 December 2014
17:30

Australia	3–0	Pakistan
Hayward 23', 54'; Whetton 59'	Report

Umpires:
Deon Nel (RSA)
Fernando Gómez (ARG)

=== Pool B ===
Pos	Team	Pld	W	D	L	GF	GA	GD	Pts	Qualification
1	Netherlands	3	2	0	1	9	4	+5	6	Quarter-finals
2	Argentina	3	2	0	1	7	5	+2	6	Quarter-finals
3	India (H)	3	1	0	2	5	7	−2	3	Quarter-finals
4	Germany	3	1	0	2	2	7	−5	3	Quarter-finals

Source: FIH
Rules for classification: 1) points; 2) goal difference; 3) goals scored; 4) head-to-head result.
(H) Hosts

6 December 2014
17:30

Netherlands	3–0	Argentina
Van der Weerden 13'; Kemperman 19'; Van Puffelen 51'	Report

Umpires:
Raghu Prasad (IND)
Peter Wright (RSA)

6 December 2014
19:30

Germany	1–0	India
Fuchs 60'	Report

Umpires:
Fernando Gómez (ARG)
Coen van Bunge (NED)

7 December 2014
17:30

Germany	1–4	Netherlands
Fuchs 56'	Report	Jonker 11'; Van Puffelen 25'; Hofman 29'; Van Ass 51'

Umpires:
Deon Nel (RSA)
Chen Dekang (CHN)

7 December 2014
19:30

Argentina	4–2	India
Vila 30'; López 37'; Mazzilli 49'; Menini 59'	Report	A. Singh 30'; Gurj. Singh 37'

Umpires:
Eduardo Lizana (ESP)
Paco Vázquez (ESP)

9 December 2014
12:00

Argentina	3–0	Germany
Paredes 18'; Menini 25'; Ortiz 49'	Report

Umpires:
Peter Wright (RSA)
Gareth Greenfield (NZL)

9 December 2014
19:30

Netherlands	2–3	India
Van der Weerden 36', 58'	Report	Sowmarpet 33'; M. Singh 47'; Rup. Singh 49'

Umpires:
Eduardo Lizana (ESP)
Andrew Kennedy (ENG)

== Second round ==
=== Bracket ===
Quarter-finals
11 December
England	0
Germany	2
11 December
Argentina	2
Australia	4
11 December
Belgium	2
India	4
11 December
Netherlands	2
Pakistan	4

Semi-finals
13 December
Germany	3
Australia	2
13 December
India	3
Pakistan	4

Final
14 December
Germany	2
Pakistan	0
Third place
14 December
Australia	2
India	1

=== Quarter-finals ===
11 December 2014
11:30

Netherlands	2–4	Pakistan
Hertzberger 6'; Jonker 39'	Report	Bhutta 16'; Imran 30'; Irfan 51', 52'

Umpires:
Eduardo Lizana (ESP)
Andrew Kennedy (ENG)

11 December 2014
13:45

Argentina	2–4	Australia
Paredes 16'; Brunet 35'	Report	Orchard 6'; Hayward 37'; Beale 42'; Ciriello 49'

Umpires:
Deon Nel (RSA)
Peter Wright (RSA)

11 December 2014
17:15

England	0–2	Germany
	Report	Fürste 30'; Rühr 58'

Umpires:
Paco Vázquez (ESP)
Raghu Prasad (IND)

11 December 2014
19:30

Belgium	2–4	India
Denayer 12'; Dockier 18'	Report	Rupinder Pal 18'; Uthappa 27'; Akashdeep 41'; Dharamvir 49'

Umpires:
Chen Dekang (CHN)
Coen van Bunge (NED)

=== Fifth to eighth place classification ===
Cross-overs
13 December
England	1
Argentina	2
13 December
Belgium	2 (2)
Netherlands (p.s.o)	2 (4)

Fifth place
14 December
Argentina	1
Netherlands	4
Seventh place
14 December
England	3
Belgium	2

==== Cross-overs ====
13 December 2014
11:30

Belgium	2–2	Netherlands
Boon 49'; Cosyns 60'	Report	Hertzberger 11'; Baart 30'
Penalties
Denayer (penalty shoot-out scored); Cosyns (penalty shoot-out missed); Van Doren (penalty shoot-out scored); Van Aubel (penalty shoot-out missed)	2–4	(penalty shoot-out scored) Hertzberger; (penalty shoot-out scored) Kemperman; (penalty shoot-out scored) Van Ass; (penalty shoot-out scored) Baart

Umpires:
Raghu Prasad (IND)
Fernando Gómez (ARG)

13 December 2014
13:45

England	1–2	Argentina
Jackson 12'	Report	Peillat 25', 48'

Umpires:
Coen van Bunge (NED)
Gareth Greenfield (NZL)

==== Seventh and eighth place ====
14 December 2014
11:30

England	3–2	Belgium
Condon 14', 19'; Griffiths 30'	Report	Van Aubel 10', 39'

Umpires:
Raghu Prasad (IND)
Fernando Gómez (ARG)

==== Fifth and sixth place ====
14 December 2014
13:45

Argentina	1–4	Netherlands
Paredes 19'	Report	Van der Weerden 47'; Hertzberger 55', 58'; Jonker 56'

Umpires:
Andrew Kennedy (ENG)
Gareth Greenfield (NZL)

=== First to fourth place classification ===
==== Semi-finals ====
13 December 2014
17:15

Germany	3–2	Australia
Oruz 5'; Grambusch 9'; Fuchs 31'	Report	Ciriello 34'; Budgeon 42'

Umpires:
Andrew Kennedy (ENG)
Chen Dekang (CHN)

13 December 2014
19:30

India	3–4	Pakistan
Gurjinder 12'; Dharamvir 38'; Thimmaiah 44'	Report	Qadir 17', 59'; Waqas 32'; Irfan 44'

Umpires:
Deon Nel (RSA)
Eduardo Lizana (ESP)

==== Third and fourth place ====
14 December 2014
17:15

Australia	2–1	India
Ockenden 18'; Gohdes 52'	Report	Upadhyay 42'

Umpires:
Peter Wright (RSA)
Chen Dekang (CHN)

==== Final ====
14 December 2014
19:30

Germany	2–0	Pakistan
Wesley 18'; Fuchs 58'	Report

Umpires:
Paco Vázquez (ESP)
Coen van Bunge (NED)

== Statistics ==
=== Final standings ===
As per statistical convention in field hockey, matches decided in extra time are counted as wins and losses, while matches decided by penalty shoot-outs are counted as draws.

Pos	Team	Pld	W	D	L	GF	GA	GD	Pts	Status
1st place, gold medalist(s)	Germany	6	4	0	2	9	9	0	12	Gold Medal
2nd place, silver medalist(s)	Pakistan	6	2	0	4	11	20	−9	6	Silver Medal
3rd place, bronze medalist(s)	Australia	6	3	1	2	16	13	+3	10	Bronze Medal
4	India	6	2	0	4	13	15	−2	6	Fourth Place
5	Netherlands	6	3	1	2	17	11	+6	10	Eliminated in Quarter-finals
6	Argentina	6	3	0	3	12	14	−2	9	Eliminated in Quarter-finals
7	England	6	3	1	2	16	10	+6	10	Eliminated in Quarter-finals
8	Belgium	6	1	3	2	13	15	−2	6	Eliminated in Quarter-finals

Source: FIH

=== Awards ===
Player of the Tournament	Top Goalscorers	Goalkeeper of the Tournament	Young player of the Tournament
(Germany) Moritz Fürste	5 Players (see list below)	(India) Sreejesh Ravindran	(India) Akashdeep Singh

=== Goalscorers ===
There were 107 goals scored in 24 matches, for an average of 4.46 goals per match.

4 goals

- (Australia) Chris Ciriello
- (Germany) Florian Fuchs
- (Netherlands) Jeroen Hertzberger
- (Netherlands) Mink van der Weerden
- (Pakistan) Muhammad Irfan

3 goals

- (Argentina) Matías Paredes
- (Australia) Jeremy Hayward
- (Belgium) Florent van Aubel
- (England) Samuel Ward
- (England) David Condon
- (Netherlands) Constantijn Jonker
- (Pakistan) Arslan Qadir

2 goals

- (Argentina) Joaquín Menini
- (Argentina) Gonzalo Peillat
- (Australia) Jacob Whetton
- (Australia) Eddie Ockenden
- (Belgium) Tom Boon
- (Belgium) Tanguy Cosyns
- (Belgium) Sébastien Dockier
- (England) Alastair Brogdon
- (England) Chris Griffiths
- (England) Ashley Jackson
- (India) Akashdeep Singh
- (India) Dharamvir Singh
- (India) Gurjinder Singh
- (India) Rupinder Pal Singh
- (Netherlands) Diede van Puffelen
- (Pakistan) Muhammad Imran

1 goal

- (Argentina) Manuel Brunet
- (Argentina) Juan Martín López
- (Argentina) Agustín Mazzilli
- (Argentina) Ignacio Ortíz
- (Argentina) Lucas Vila
- (Australia) Daniel Beale
- (Australia) Nicholas Budgeon
- (Australia) Matthew Gohdes
- (Australia) Flynn Ogilvie
- (Australia) Simon Orchard
- (Belgium) Thomas Briels
- (Belgium) Félix Denayer
- (Belgium) John-John Dohmen
- (Belgium) Amaury Keusters
- (England) Nicholas Catlin
- (England) Mark Gleghorne
- (England) Iain Lewers
- (England) Barry Middleton
- (Germany) Moritz Fürste
- (Germany) Mats Grambusch
- (Germany) Timur Oruz
- (Germany) Christopher Rühr
- (Germany) Christopher Wesley
- (India) Manpreet Singh
- (India) S.V. Sunil
- (India) Nikkin Thimmaiah
- (India) Lalit Upadhyay
- (India) S. K. Uthappa
- (Netherlands) Sander Baart
- (Netherlands) Rogier Hofman
- (Netherlands) Robbert Kemperman
- (Netherlands) Seve van Ass
- (Pakistan) Muhammad Umar Bhutta
- (Pakistan) Muhammad Waqas

Source: FIH

== See also ==
- 2014 Men's Hockey Champions Challenge I
- 2014 Men's Hockey World Cup
- 2014 Women's Hockey Champions Trophy
