= Rashid Mehmood =

Pakistani field hockey player

Personal information
- Born: 15 August 1987 (age 38) Bahawalpur, Pakistan

Sport
- Sport: Field hockey
- Position: Defender
- Club: Schaerweijde
Senior career
Years	Team	Caps	Goals
2012–2016	Oranje Zwart	-	-
2016–2019	Oranje-Rood	-	-
2019–	Schaerweijde	-	-
National team
Years	Team	Caps	Goals
2011–	Pakistan	138	-
Medal record
Men's field hockey
Representing Pakistan
Asian Games
Silver medal – second place	2014 Incheon	Team
Asia Cup
Bronze medal – third place	2013 Ipoh
Bronze medal – third place	2017 Dhaka
Champions Trophy
Silver medal – second place	2014 Bhubaneswar
Bronze medal – third place	2012 Melbourne
Asian Champions Trophy
Gold medal – first place	2012 Doha
Gold medal – first place	2013 Kakamigahara
Silver medal – second place	2011 Ordos City
Silver medal – second place	2016 Kuantan
- Updated on 1 July 2019

Rashid Mehmood (born 15 August 1987) is a Pakistani field hockey player who plays as a defender for Dutch club Schaerweijde and the Pakistan national team.

== Club career ==
Rashid started playing club hockey in the Netherlands in 2012 when he was signed by Oranje Zwart. After Oranje Zwart merged with EMHC in 2016, he started playing for the newly formed club HC Oranje-Rood. After his contract expired in 2019, he joined Schaerweijde.

== International career ==
=== 2012 ===
Mehmood was included in the Pakistan national squad for the 2012 Olympic Games in London, UK.
