= Muhammad Rizwan Sr. =

Pakistani field hockey player

Muhammad Rizwan
Personal information
- Full name: Muhammad Rizwan Sr.
- Born: 31 December 1989 (age 36) Toba Tek Singh, Pakistan

Sport
- Sport: Field hockey
- Position: Midfielder
- Club: Schaerweijde
Senior career
| Years | Team | Caps | Goals |
| 2012–2016 | Oranje Zwart | - | - |
| 2016–2019 | Oranje-Rood | - | - |
| 2019– | Schaerweijde | - | - |
National team
| Years | Team | Caps | Goals |
| 2011– | Pakistan | 184 (25) | - |
Medal record
Men's field hockey
Representing Pakistan
Asian Games
| Silver medal – second place | 2014 Incheon | Team |
Asia Cup
| Bronze medal – third place | 2017 Dhaka |
Champions Trophy
| Silver medal – second place | 2014 Bhubaneswar |
| Bronze medal – third place | 2012 Melbourne |
Asian Champions Trophy
| Gold medal – first place | 2012 Doha |
| Gold medal – first place | 2013 Kakamigahara |
| Gold medal – first place | 2018 Muscat |
| Silver medal – second place | 2011 Ordos City |
| Silver medal – second place | 2016 Kuantan |
- Updated on 1 July 2019

Muhammad Rizwan Sr. (born 31 December 1989) is a Pakistani field hockey player who plays as a midfielder for Dutch club Schaerweijde and the Pakistan national team.

== Club career ==
Rizwan Sr. has played club hockey in the Netherlands since 2012, when he was signed by Oranje Zwart. After Oranje Zwart merged with EMHC in 2016, he started playing for the newly formed club HC Oranje-Rood. After his contract at Oranje-Rood expired in 2019, he joined Schaerweijde.

== International career ==
=== 2012 ===
Rizwan was included in the squad for the 2012 Olympic Games in London, UK. He was in the runners-up squad of Pakistan at 2014 Men's Hockey Champions Trophy. At the 2018 World Cup, Rizwan was the captain of the Pakistan team, but only played two games after having to withdraw injured following the game against Malaysia.

== See also ==
- Muhammad Rizwan Jr. (born 1991)
