= Fareed Ahmad =

Fareed Ahmad can refer to:

- Fareed Ahmad (cricketer) (born 1994), Afghan cricketer
- Fareed Ahmad (field hockey) (born 1989), Pakistani field hockey player

== See also ==
- Fareed Ahmed (born 1989), Pakistani field hockey player
