= Manpreet Singh (field hockey) =

Indian field hockey player

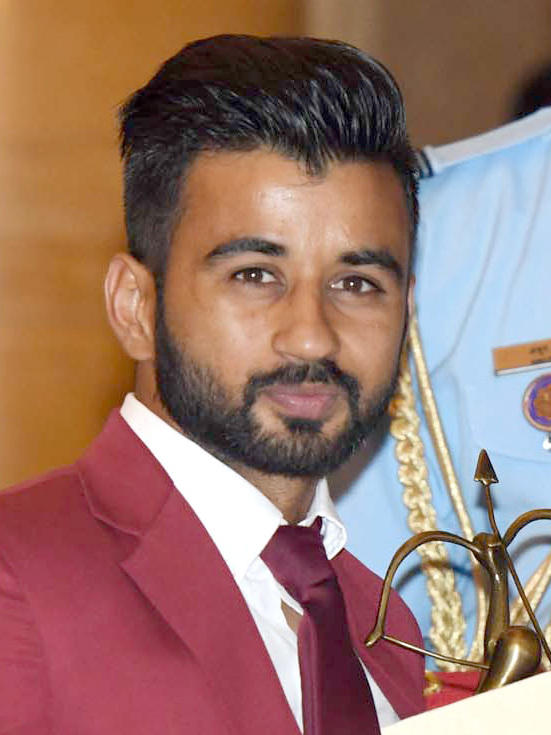
- Singh in 2018

Personal information
- Full name: Manpreet Singh Pawar
- Born: 26 June 1992 (age 34) Jalandhar, Punjab, India
- Height: 1.71 m (5 ft 7 in)
- Weight: 69 kg (152 lb)
- Spouse: Illi Saddique (m. 2020)

Sport
- Sport: Field hockey
- Position: Midfielder
- Club: Punjab Armed Police
National team
Years	Team	Caps	Goals
2013–2015	India U21	92	(2)
2011–	India	430	(23)
Medal record
Men's field hockey
Representing India
Olympic Games
Bronze medal – third place	2020 Tokyo	Team
Bronze medal – third place	2024 Paris	Team
World League
Bronze medal – third place	2014–15 Raipur	Team
Bronze medal – third place	2016–17 Bhubaneswar	Team
Champions Trophy
Silver medal – second place	2016 London
Silver medal – second place	2018 Breda
Commonwealth Games
Silver medal – second place	2014 Glasgow	Team
Silver medal – second place	2022 Birmingham	Team
Asian Games
Gold medal – first place	2014 Incheon	Team
Gold medal – first place	2022 Hangzhou	Team
Gold medal – first place	2026 Aichi-Nagoya	Team
Bronze medal – third place	2018 Jakarta	Team
Asia Cup
Gold medal – first place	2017 Dhaka
Gold medal – first place	2025 Rajgir
Silver medal – second place	2013 Ipoh
Asian Champions Trophy
Gold medal – first place	2011 Ordos City
Gold medal – first place	2018 Muscat
Gold medal – first place	2023 Chennai
Gold medal – first place	2024 Hulunbuir
Bronze medal – third place	2021 Dhaka
South Asian Games
Silver medal – second place	2016 Guwahati	Team

Manpreet Singh (born 26 June 1992) is an Indian field hockey player and a four time Olympian. He led the Indian field hockey team to the bronze medal at the 2020 Tokyo Olympics.

He is the only Indian hockey player to win three Asian Games golds.

He became the first Indian hockey player to win the FIH Best Player of the year award at the 2019 FIH Awards.

He first played for India in 2011 at the age of 19. He represented India at the 2012 London Olympics and was named Asia's Junior Player of the Year in 2014.

He became India's Most-Capped Hockey Player by surpassing Dilip Tirkey (412 caps) on 17 June 2026.

== Early and personal life ==
Singh was born in a farming Sikh family in Mithapur village on outskirts of Jalandhar in Punjab, India. Singh married Malaysian-Pakistani Illi Najwa Saddique on 16 December 2020 in Punjab. He first met her when the team featured in the Sultan of Johor Cup in 2013 where the Indian team won the gold medal. Illi previously worked in Johor at the University of Southampton Malaysia Campus, but subsequently moved to India after their marriage.

Before the game he focuses and relaxes by meditating with yoga, playing PlayStation and by listening to the Punjabi Bhangra music specially by Diljit Dosanjh and Honey Singh. He carries his PlayStation with him whenever he travels for matches. He is a fan of Salman Khan and enjoys watching movies of sports genre, such as M.S. Dhoni: The Untold Story, Chak De! India, and Bhaag Milkha Bhaag, and he would love to try acting in movies if offered a role.

His dream is to "win big for India" and his goal is to "inspire youngsters to play a sport, any sport".

== Sports career ==
He was inspired by the former Indian hockey captain Padma Shri Pargat Singh, who also hails from Manpreet's Mithapur village. He was further attracted by the prizes his elder brothers won while playing hockey. Around 2002, he started to play hockey regularly at the age of 10 when his mother locked him in room to prevent him from playing hockey. However, he eventually managed to escape. His coach told his angry elder brother to at least let him try since he was so keen to play. Manpreet's family started to support him completely after he won his first prize of 2013 Sultan of Johor Cup ₹500 cash (US$12 per 2002 conversion rate) in a tournament. In 2005, he enrolled in India's one of the most sought-after hockey academies, the Surjit Hockey Academy in Jalandhar. In 2011, he made his international debut as part of Indian junior team. He idolises former German captain Moritz Fürste and is inspired by Sardar Singh's style of play. He is also a fan of Cristiano Ronaldo and David Beckham, and just like them he also wears the same jersey number 7. Finally he won gold medal in 2022 Asian Games in Hangzhou.

=== Junior Hockey ===
In 2013 he became captain of India junior men's hockey team in the 2013 Men's Hockey Junior World Cup. Indian team also won the final gold medal under his captainship in the 2013 Sultan of Johor Cup after defeating Malaysia 3–0 in final where Manpreet also scored a goal. In 2014, he was titled Junior Player of the Year by the Asian Hockey Federation.

=== Senior Hockey ===
==== 2012–2016: Olympic, Commonwealth and Asian Games wins ====
In the 2012 Summer Olympics, he represented India.

In the 2014 Asian Games at Incheon in South Korea, he was part of India's men's hockey team that won Gold medal after defeating arch rival Pakistan in final by 4–2.

In the 2014 Commonwealth Games at Glasgow in Scotland, India won silver medal after losing to Australia in final by 4–0.

In the 2016 Men's Hockey Champions Trophy at London, India won silver medal after losing to Australia in the final by 1–3, where India had made finals after 38 years.

In the 2016 Summer Olympics, he was named in the Indian squad, where India lost 1–3 to Belgium in the quarterfinals.

==== Father's death during 2016 Sultan Azlan Shah Cup ====
Few hours before the 6 April 2016 Japan vs India opening match 2016 Sultan Azlan Shah Cup, which India won 1–2, he received the news of his father's sudden death, He missed the next Australia vs India match on 7 April 2016 as he went back to India to perform death rituals for his father, Australian players observed a minute's silence while wearing black arm band to show support for Manpreet and India lost in his absence by 5–1. His mother told him to go back and play to fulfill his father's wish of giving his best to play for the pride of nation. He came back to join the team to play the next Canada vs India match on 10 April 2016, which India won by 1–3. India won again by 5–1 in the next Pakistan vs India match on 12 April 2016 where Manpreet played an important role in creating an early pressure by scoring a goal within first 4 minutes. New Zealand won 2–1 against India on 13 April 2016, where Manpreet scored India's sole goal. India won 6–1 against Malaysia on 15 April 2016 in their last pool match. India won the second place after losing the final against Australia by 4–0 on 16 April 2016. Out of India's total 18 goals in the tournament, he scored 2 during the period of mourning despite missing few matches.

==== Captain of India 2017 Onward ====
On 18 May 2017, he was promoted to captain India's hockey team for the three Nations Invitational Tournament in Germany that started on 1 June and the World League Semi Final in England that started on 15 June. He was awarded 2019 Men's FIH Player of the Year Awards. In Tokyo 2020 Olympics, he went there as the captain of Indian National Men's Hockey Team. Also, he was the flagbearer during the opening ceremony of the olympics, along with Mary Kom. At the Tokyo 2020 Olympics, he captained India towards victory by bringing bronze medal for country. India defeated Germany by 5–4.

==== Tokyo Olympics 2020 ====
In the Tokyo Olympics held in 2021, Manpreet Singh led the Indian men's team to a bronze medal. After losing 1–7 to Australia in the second match of the group stage, India, under his leadership, staged a remarkable comeback to defeat Spain, Argentina (the then defending champion) and Japan in succession. They beat Great Britain 3–1 in the quarter-final but fell to then World no. 1 and eventual gold medallists Belgium 2–5 in the semi-finals. In the bronze-medal match, India defeated Germany 5–4 to win the bronze medal. It was the Indian hockey team's first podium finish at the Olympic Games since 1980.

== Franchise career ==
=== Team Gonasika ===
In 2024, during the 2024–25 Hockey India League auctions, Team Gonasika bought him for ₹42 lakhs.

== Awards ==
- 2021 – Khel Ratna Award, highest sporting honour of India.

Olympic Games
Preceded by Abhinav Bindra	Flagbearer for India (with Mary Kom); Tokyo 2020	Succeeded by P. V. Sindhu; Sharath Kamal
