= Wataru Matsumoto =

Japanese baseball player (born 1996)

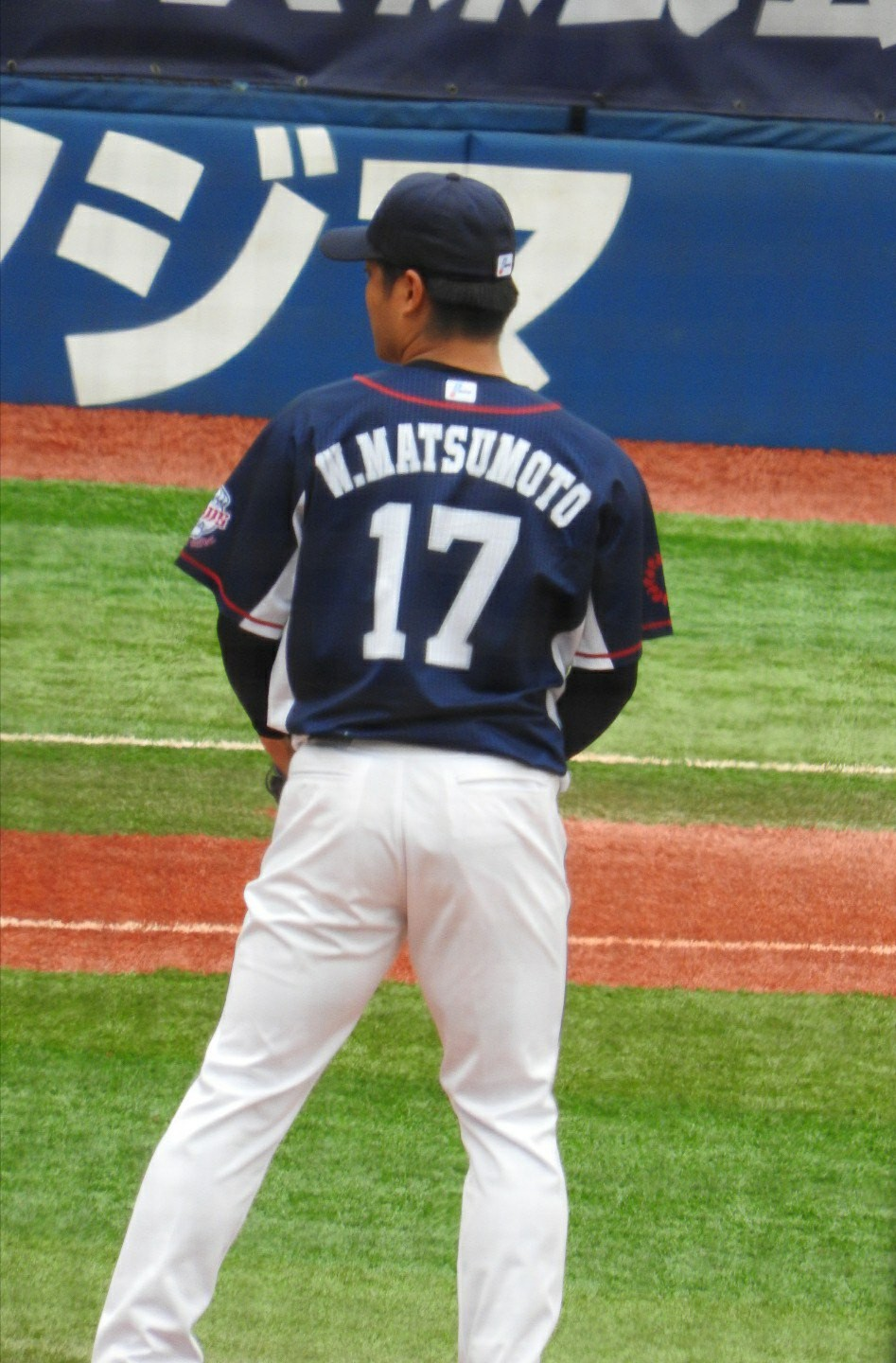

Saitama Seibu Lions – No. 17
- Pitcher
- Born: November 28, 1996 (age 29); Asago, Hyōgo, Japan
- Bats: Right Throws: Right

NPB debut
- May 19, 2019, for the Saitama Seibu Lions

Career statistics (through April 6, 2022)
- Win–loss record: 24-20
- Earned Run Average: 4.21
- Strikeouts: 268
- Stats at Baseball Reference

Teams
- Saitama Seibu Lions (2019–present)

Career highlights and awards
- NPB All-Star (2021)

Wataru Matsumoto (松本 航, Matsumoto Wataru; born November 28, 1996 in Asago, Hyōgo, Japan) is a professional Japanese baseball player. He plays pitcher for the Saitama Seibu Lions.
