= Pardeep Mor =

Indian field hockey player (born 1992)

Personal information
- Born: 6 March 1992 (age 34) Narwana, Haryana, India

Sport
- Sport: Field hockey
- Position: Defender
National team
Years	Team	Caps	Goals
–	India		-
Medal record
Men's field hockey
Representing India
Asian Champions Trophy
Gold medal – first place	2016 Kuantan
Hockey Champions Trophy
Silver medal – second place	2016 London	Team

Pardeep Mor (born 3 June 1992 in Narwana, Haryana) is an Indian field hockey player. He usually plays in the Defender position.

== Achievements ==
Selected as a Team member for Rio Olympics. Pardeep Mor was bought by Kalinga Lancers for $37,000 in the Hockey India League Auction 2015. He has 16 international caps and 0 goals. Pardeep Mor is a part of SAI Sonepat.
