= Samuel Ward (field hockey) =

English field hockey player (born 1990)

Sam Ward
Personal information
- Born: 24 December 1990 (age 35) Leicester, England
- Height: 1.78 m (5 ft 10 in)
- Weight: 75 kg (165 lb)

Sport
- Sport: Field hockey
- Position: Forward
Senior career
Years	Team	Caps	Goals
–2009	Leicester	-	-
2009–2011	Beeston	14	23
2011–2013	Loughborough Students	13	16
2013–2015	Beeston	27	41
2015–2017	Holcombe	28	30
2017–2018	Beeston	-	-
2018–2026	Old Georgians	9	15
National team
Years	Team	Caps	Goals
2014–	England & GB	141	(83)
Medal record
Men's field hockey
Representing England
EuroHockey Championship
Silver medal – second place	2023 Mönchengladbach
Bronze medal – third place	2017 Amstelveen
Commonwealth Games
Bronze medal – third place	2018 Gold Coast	Team
Bronze medal – third place	2022 Birmingham	Team

Samuel Ian Ward (born 24 December 1990), known as Sam Ward, is an English field hockey player who plays as a forward for Old Georgians and the England and Great Britain national teams. He competed at three Olympic Games.

== Biography ==
Ward played club hockey Leicester, Beeston (3 spells), Loughborough Students. It was while at Beeston that he played for England in the 2014 Men's Hockey Champions Trophy.

He left Beeston for Holcombe and was selected for Great Britain at the 2016 Olympic Games. He represented England at the 2018 Commonwealth Games in Gold Coast.

After his third and final spell at Beeston, Ward joined Old Georgians in the Men's England Hockey League Premier Division for the 2018–19 Men's Hockey League season.

During the Olympic Qualifier against Malaysia, he was struck by the ball in the face and he lost some sight in his left eye. Despite the injury, on 28 May 2021 he was selected in the England squad for the 2021 EuroHockey Championship. and attended his second Olympic Games in delayed 2020 Olympic Games in Tokyo.

He won a bronze medal with England in the Men's tournament at the 2022 Commonwealth Games in Birmingham.

Ward helped Old Georgians complete the league and cup double during the 2022–23 season. He won a silver medal with England at the 2023 Men's EuroHockey Championship in Mönchengladbach.

He was selected to represent Great Britain at the 2024 Summer Olympics. The team went out in the quarter-finals after losing a penalty shootout to India.

He won another Premier league title with Old Georgians in 2026.
