= Rizwan Ali =

Pakistani cricketer (born 1999)

Personal information
- Born: 17 August 1999 (age 27); Islamabad, Pakistan
- Batting: Right-handed

Domestic team information
- Years: Team
- 2018–19: Islamabad
- Source: Cricinfo, 18 September 2018

Rizwan Ali (born 17 August 1999) is a Pakistani cricketer. He made his first-class debut for Islamabad in the 2018–19 Quaid-e-Azam Trophy on 16 September 2018.
