= 2017 Men's Hockey Asia Cup =

Field hockey competition

Hero Men's Asia Cup 2017

Tournament details
- Host country: Bangladesh
- City: Dhaka
- Dates: 11–22 October
- Teams: 8 (from 1 confederation)
- Venue: Maulana Bhasani Hockey Stadium

Final positions
- Champions: India (3rd title)
- Runner-up: Malaysia
- Third place: Pakistan

Tournament statistics
- Matches played: 24
- Goals scored: 126 (5.25 per match)
- Top scorer(s): (India) Harmanpreet Singh (Malaysia) Faizal Saari (7 goals)

The 2017 Men's Hockey Asia Cup, also known as the Hero Men's Asia Cup 2017 due to sponsorship reasons, was the tenth edition of the Men's Hockey Asia Cup. It was held from 11 to 22 October 2017 in Dhaka, Bangladesh. The winner of this tournament qualified for the 2018 World Cup in India. India won their third title after defeating Malaysia 2–1 in the final, while Pakistan captured the bronze medal beating South Korea 6–3. The tournament was organised under the chairmanship of Shafiullah Al Munir.

== Qualified teams ==
Sri Lanka withdrew and were replaced by China.

Dates	Event	Location	Quotas	Qualifier(s)
24 August – 1 September 2013	2013 Asia Cup	Ipoh, Malaysia	6	India; Japan; Malaysia; Oman; Pakistan; South Korea
19–27 November 2016	2016 AHF Cup	Hong Kong	1	Bangladesh; ~~Sri Lanka~~
—N/a	Reallocation	—N/a	1	China
Total			8	

== Results ==
All times are local (UTC+6).

=== Preliminary round ===
==== Pool A ====
Pos	Team	Pld	W	D	L	GF	GA	GD	Pts	Qualification
1	India	3	3	0	0	15	2	+13	9	Super 4s
2	Pakistan	3	1	1	1	10	5	+5	4	Super 4s
3	Japan	3	1	1	1	6	8	−2	4	5–8th place semi-finals
4	Bangladesh (H)	3	0	0	3	1	17	−16	0	5–8th place semi-finals

Source: FIH
(H) Hosts

11 October 2017
15:00

India	5–1	Japan
Sunil 3'; Lalit 22'; Ramandeep 33'; Harmanpreet 35', 48'	Report	Kitazato 4'

Umpires:
Zeke Newman (AUS)
Yoon Dong-shin (KOR)

11 October 2017
17:30

Pakistan	7–0	Bangladesh
Mahmood 18', 41', 50'; Butt 33', 47'; Qadir 33', 60'	Report

Umpires:
Sebastien Michielsen (BEL)
Ilanggo Kanabathu (MAS)

13 October 2017
15:00

Japan	2–2	Pakistan
Ke. Tanaka 22'; Yoshihara 29'	Report	Qadir 16'; Bhutta 50'

Umpires:
David Tomlinson (NZL)
Saleh Al-Balushi (OMA)

13 October 2017
17:30

India	7–0	Bangladesh
Gurjant 7'; Akashdeep 10'; Sunil 13'; Amit 20'; Harmanpreet 28', 47'; Ramandeep 46'	Report

Umpires:
Sebastien Michielsen (BEL)
Tao Zhinan (CHN)

15 October 2017
15:00

Japan	3–1	Bangladesh
Kitazato 22'; Ke. Tanaka 59', 60'	Report	Chayan 28'

Umpires:
Sebastien Michielsen (BEL)
Saleh Al-Balushi (OMA)

15 October 2017
17:30

Pakistan	1–3	India
Shan 48'	Report	Chinglensana 17'; Ramandeep 44'; Harmanpreet 45'

Umpires:
Ilanggo Kanabathu (MAS)
Tao Zhinan (CHN)

==== Pool B ====
Pos	Team	Pld	W	D	L	GF	GA	GD	Pts	Qualification
1	Malaysia	3	3	0	0	16	3	+13	9	Super 4s
2	South Korea	3	2	0	1	12	5	+7	6	Super 4s
3	China	3	1	0	2	4	12	−8	3	5–8th place semi-finals
4	Oman	3	0	0	3	4	16	−12	0	5–8th place semi-finals

Source: FIH

12 October 2017
15:00

Malaysia	7–1	China
Tengku 12', 19'; Faizal 17', 31', 41'; Shahril 35'; Rosli 60'	Report	E Wenhui 56'

Umpires:
David Tomlinson (NZL)
Deepak Joshi (IND)

12 October 2017
17:30

South Korea	7–2	Oman
Lee Moo-kyoung 22'; Cho Suk-hoon 35'; Seo In-woo 39'; Yang Ji-hun 41', 60+'; Lee Nam-yong 47'; Jang Jong-hyun 48'	Report	Bait 18'; Al-Qasmi 52'

Umpires:
Tyler Klenk (CAN)
Salim Lucky (BAN)

14 October 2017
15:00

China	2–1	Oman
Du Talake 7'; Guan Quyang 44'	Report	Al-Fazari 8'

Umpires:
Haider Rasool (PAK)
Tyler Klenk (CAN)

14 October 2017
17:30

South Korea	1–2	Malaysia
Lee Seung-hoon 27'	Report	Faizal 17'; Azri 19'

Umpires:
Zeke Newman (AUS)
Michihiko Watanabe (JPN)

16 October 2017
15:00

Malaysia	7–1	Oman
Faizal 16', 27'; Tengku 18', 23'; Shahril 20'; Amirol 27'; Najmi 42'	Report	Al-Nofali 25'

Umpires:
Salim Lucky (BAN)
Deepak Joshi (IND)

16 October 2017
17:30

China	1–4	South Korea
Du Talake 38'	Report	Jang Jong-hyun 10', 43'; Kim Seong-kyu 47'; Yang Ji-hun 57'

Umpires:
Michihiko Watanabe (JPN)
Haider Rasool (PAK)

=== Fifth to eighth place classification ===
5–8th place semi-finals
18 October
Japan	5
Oman	3
19 October
China	3 (3)
Bangladesh (p.s.o.)	3 (4)

Fifth place
20 October
Japan	4
Bangladesh	0
Seventh place
20 October
Oman	2
China	3

==== 5–8th place semi-finals ====
18 October 2017
20:00

Japan	5–3	Oman
Yamada 9'; Yamasaki 21'; Kitazato 23', 34'; Ke. Tanaka 29'	Report	Al-Saadi 2', 24'; Al-Fazari 50'

Umpires:
Yoon Dong-shin (KOR)
Deepak Joshi (IND)

19 October 2017
20:00

China	3–3	Bangladesh
Du Talake 17', 19', 28'	Report	Islam 25'; Hossain 53'; Rahman 54'
Penalties
Meng Dihao (penalty shoot-out scored); Guo Zixiang (penalty shoot-out scored); Ao Suozhu (penalty shoot-out missed); Ao Yang (penalty shoot-out scored); Guo Xiaoping (penalty shoot-out missed)	3–4	(penalty shoot-out scored) Shetul; (penalty shoot-out scored) Uddin; (penalty shoot-out missed) Sobuj; (penalty shoot-out scored) Mimo; (penalty shoot-out scored) Mahmud

Umpires:
Haider Rasool (PAK)
Saleh Al-Balushi (OMA)

==== Seventh place game ====
20 October 2017
15:00

Oman	2–3	China
Al-Qasmi 16'; Rajab 56'	Report	Su Lixing 11'; Du Chen 27'; Guo Xiaoping 52'

Umpires:
Yoon Dong-shin (KOR)
Salim Lucky (BAN)

==== Fifth place game ====
20 October 2017
17:30

Japan	4–0	Bangladesh
Yamada 17'; Kitazato 46'; Murata 49'; S. Tanaka 53'	Report

Umpires:
Saleh Al-Balushi (OMA)
Tao Zhinan (CHN)

=== First to fourth place classification ===
==== Super 4s ====
Pos	Team	Pld	W	D	L	GF	GA	GD	Pts	Qualification
1	India	3	2	1	0	11	3	+8	7	Final
2	Malaysia	3	1	1	1	6	9	−3	4	Final
3	South Korea	3	0	3	0	3	3	0	3	Third place game
4	Pakistan	3	0	1	2	3	8	−5	1	Third place game

Source: FIH

18 October 2017
15:00

Malaysia	3–2	Pakistan
Razie 10'; Shahril 25'; Fitri 34'	Report	Bhutta 1'; Yaqoob 19'

Umpires:
Zeke Newman (AUS)
Tao Zhinan (CHN)

18 October 2017
17:30

India	1–1	South Korea
Gurjant 60'	Report	Lee Jung-jun 41'

Umpires:
David Tomlinson (NZL)
Ilanggo Kanabathu (MAS)

19 October 2017
15:00

South Korea	1–1	Pakistan
Lee Nam-yong 48'	Report	Ahmad 15'

Umpires:
Tyler Klenk (CAN)
Michihiko Watanabe (JPN)

19 October 2017
17:30

Malaysia	2–6	India
Razie 50'; Rosli 59'	Report	Akashdeep 14'; Harmanpreet 19'; Uthappa 24'; Gurjant 33'; Sunil 40'; Sardara 60'

Umpires:
Sebastien Michielsen (BEL)
Salim Lucky (BAN)

21 October 2017
19:00

India	4–0	Pakistan
Satbir 39'; Harmanpreet 51'; Lalit 52'; Gurjant 57'	Report

Umpires:
David Tomlinson (NZL)
Sebastien Michielsen (BEL)

21 October 2017
21:30

South Korea	1–1	Malaysia
Yang Ji-hun 24'	Report	Faizal 59'

Umpires:
Tyler Klenk (CAN)
Zeke Newman (AUS)

==== Third place game ====
22 October 2017
15:00

South Korea	3–6	Pakistan
Cho Suk-hoon 20'; Lee Nam-yong 43'; Seo In-woo 55'	Report	Ajaz Ahmad 10', 30', 36'; Rashid 26'; Mahmood 32'; Yaqoob 56'

Umpires:
Ilanggo Kanabathu (MAS)
Sebastien Michielsen (BEL)

==== Final ====
22 October 2017
17:30

India	2–1	Malaysia
Ramandeep 3'; Lalit 29'	Report	Shahril 50'

Umpires:
Michihiko Watanabe (JPN)
David Tomlinson (NZL)

== Winners ==
2017 Men's Hockey Asia Cup winners

India
Third title

== Statistics ==
=== Final standings ===
Rank	Team
Gold medal	India
Silver medal	Malaysia
Bronze medal	Pakistan
4	South Korea
5	Japan
6	Bangladesh
7	China
8	Oman

Qualified for the 2018 World Cup as hosts

=== Goalscorers ===
There were 126 goals scored in 24 matches, for an average of 5.25 goals per match.

7 goals

- (India) Harmanpreet Singh
- (Malaysia) Faizal Saari

5 goals

- (China) Du Talake
- (Japan) Kenji Kitazato

4 goals

- (India) Gurjant Singh
- (India) Ramandeep Singh
- (India) Lalit Upadhyay
- (Japan) Kenta Tanaka
- (Malaysia) Shahril Saabah
- (Malaysia) Tengku Ahmad Tajuddin
- (Pakistan) Ajaz Ahmad
- (Pakistan) Abu Mahmood
- (South Korea) Yang Ji-hun

3 goals

- (Oman) Rashad Al-Fazari
- (Pakistan) Arslan Qadir
- (South Korea) Jang Jong-hyun
- (South Korea) Lee Nam-yong

2 goals

- (India) Akashdeep Singh
- (India) S. V. Sunil
- (Japan) Shota Yamada
- (Malaysia) Razie Rahim
- (Malaysia) Ramadan Rosli
- (Oman) Asaad Mubarak Al-Qasmi
- (Oman) Salah Al-Saadi
- (Pakistan) Muhammad Umar Bhutta
- (Pakistan) Ammad Butt
- (Pakistan) Muhammad Yaqoob
- (South Korea) Cho Suk-hoon
- (South Korea) Seo In-woo

1 goal

- (Bangladesh) Mamunur-Rahman Chayan
- (Bangladesh) Milon Hossain
- (Bangladesh) Ashraful Islam
- (Bangladesh) Khorshadur Rahman
- (China) Du Chen
- (China) E Wenhui
- (China) Guan Quyang
- (China) Guo Xiaoping
- (China) Su Lixing
- (India) Chinglensana Kangujam
- (India) Amit Rohidas
- (India) S. K. Uthappa
- (India) Sardara Singh
- (India) Satbir Singh
- (Japan) Kazuma Murata
- (Japan) Seren Tanaka
- (Japan) Koji Yamasaki
- (Japan) Heita Yoshihara
- (Malaysia) Amirol Arshad
- (Malaysia) Azri Hassan
- (Malaysia) Najmi Jazlan
- (Malaysia) Fitri Saari
- (Oman) Ahmed Al-Nofali
- (Oman) Basim Khatar Rajab
- (Pakistan) Rashid Mehmood
- (Pakistan) Ali Shan
- (South Korea) Kim Seong-kyu
- (South Korea) Lee Jung-jun
- (South Korea) Lee Mook-young
- (South Korea) Lee Seung-hoon

Source: FIH

== See also ==
- 2017 Women's Hockey Asia Cup
