= Hiromasa Ochiai =

Japanese field hockey player (born 1994)

Personal information
- Born: 9 February 1994 (age 32) Shimane Prefecture, Japan
- Height: 1.77 m (5 ft 10 in)

Sport
- Sport: Field hockey
- Position: Midfielder
- Club: Tochigi Liebe
National team
Years	Team	Caps	Goals
2016–present	Japan	88	(7)
Medal record
Men's field hockey
Representing Japan
Asian Games
Gold medal – first place	2018 Jakarta	Team
Asian Champions Trophy
Silver medal – second place	2021 Dhaka
- Updated on 25 December 2021

Hiromasa Ochiai (落合 大将, Ochiai Hiromasa, born 9 February 1994) is a Japanese field hockey player. He competed in the 2020 Summer Olympics.

He was a part of the Japan squad which won their first Asian Games gold medal in hockey in 2018.
