= Flynn Ogilvie =

Australian field hockey player

Personal information
- Full name: Flynn Andrew Ogilvie
- Born: 17 September 1993 (age 32) Wollongong, New South Wales, Australia

Sport
- Sport: Field hockey
- Position: Midfielder
- Club: NSW Waratahs
National team
Years	Team	Caps	Goals
2014–2024	Australia	115	(22)
Medal record
Men's field hockey
Representing Australia
Olympic Games
Silver medal – second place	2020 Tokyo	Team
World Cup
Bronze medal – third place	2018 Bhubaneswar
Oceania Cup
Gold medal – first place	2015 Stratford
Gold medal – first place	2019 Rockhampton
Gold medal – first place	2023 Whangārei
FIH Pro League
Gold medal – first place	2019 Amstelveen
Champions Trophy
Gold medal – first place	2018 Breda
Gold medal – first place	2016 London
Bronze medal – third place	2014 Bhubaneswar
Commonwealth Games
Gold medal – first place	2018 Gold Coast	Team
Gold medal – first place	2022 Birmingham	Team
Men's Hockey5s
Youth Olympic Games
Gold medal – first place	2010 Singapore	Team

Flynn Andrew Ogilvie (born 17 September 1993) is an Australian field hockey player, and Commonwealth Games gold medallist.

== Personal life ==
Ogilvie was born in Wollongong, New South Wales.

== Career ==
=== Junior National Teams ===
Ogilvie first represented Australia in 2010, at the Youth Olympic Games in Singapore. This was the first edition of field hockey at the Summer Youth Olympics, with Australia winning the inaugural gold medal.

In 2013, Ogilvie again represented Australia at junior level on three occasions. At the 2013 Australian Youth Olympic Festival, Ogilvie was a member of the gold medal-winning Australia team in the men's competition.

At the 2013 Junior Oceania Cup, Australia won gold, qualifying for the Junior World Cup. At the Junior World Cup, Ogilvie again represented the Australia Under 21's, helping the team to a 5th-place finish.

=== Senior National Team ===
Ogilvie made his senior international debut in 2014, in a test series against India in Perth, Australia.

Since his debut, Ogilvie has become a regular inclusion in the Australian team.

Most notably, Ogilvie was a member of the Gold Medal-winning Australia team at the 2018 Commonwealth Games. This marked a record 6th title for the Australian team, winning in every edition of Hockey at the Commonwealth Games.

Ogilvie was selected in the Kookaburras Olympics squad for the Tokyo 2020 Olympics. The team reached the final for the first time since 2004 but couldn't achieve gold, beaten by Belgium in a shootout.
