= Talwinder Singh =

Indian field hockey player (born 1994)

Personal information
- Born: 1 January 1994 (age 32) Mithapur, Jalandhar, Punjab, India

Sport
- Sport: Field hockey
- Position: Forward
National team
Years	Team	Caps	Goals
–	India		-
Medal record
Men's field hockey
Representing India
Asian Champions Trophy
Gold medal – first place	2016 Kuantan
Hockey Champions Trophy
Silver medal – second place	2016 London
Hockey World League
Bronze medal – third place	2014–15 Raipur	Team
- Updated on 8 July 2016

Talwinder Singh (born 1 January 1994) is an Indian field hockey player who plays as a forward.
