= Firhan Ashari =

Malaysian field hockey player (born 1993)

Personal information
- Full name: Muhammad Firhan Ashari
- Born: 9 March 1993 (age 33) Terengganu, Malaysia

Sport
- Sport: Field hockey
- Position: Forward
Senior career
Years	Team	Caps	Goals
2011–	Tenaga Nasional	-	-
National team
Years	Team	Caps	Goals
2013	Malaysia U21	25	-
2011–	Malaysia	148	-
Medal record
Asian Games
Silver medal – second place	2018 Jakarta-Palembang	Team
Asia Cup
Silver medal – second place	2022 Jakarta
Asian Champions Trophy
Silver medal – second place	2023 Chennai
Bronze medal – third place	2011 Ordos City
Bronze medal – third place	2012 Doha
Bronze medal – third place	2016 Malaysia
Bronze medal – third place	2018 Muscat

Muhammad Firhan Ashari (born 9 March 1993) is a Malaysian field hockey player. He competed at the 2018 Asian Games.

Firhan, in his debut season in the Malaysia Hockey League (MHL), scored six goals for Tenaga Nasional. His performance in the MHL earned him a national senior call-up. He made his international senior team debut in the 2011 Sultan Azlan Shah Cup in Ipoh.

He was part of Malaysia's Champions Trophy squad in 2011 where he scored a goal seven seconds from time to help Malaysia win the bronze medal in the inaugural AHF Champions Trophy in Ordos City, China.
