= Daniel Beale (field hockey) =

Australian field hockey player

Personal information
- Full name: Daniel James Beale
- Born: 12 February 1993 (age 33) Brisbane, Australia
- Height: 1.84 m (6 ft 0 in)
- Weight: 74 kg (163 lb)

Sport
- Sport: Field hockey
- Position: Forward
Senior career
Years	Team	Caps	Goals
2013–2016	QLD Blades	-	-
2016–2017	Bloemendaal	-	-
National team
Years	Team	Caps	Goals
2013–	Australia	183	(28)
Medal record
Representing Australia
Olympic Games
Silver medal – second place	2020 Tokyo	Team
World Cup
Bronze medal – third place	2018 Bhubaneswar
Champions Trophy
Gold medal – first place	2018 Breda	Team
Bronze medal – third place	2014 Bhubaneswar	Team
Commonwealth Games
Gold medal – first place	2014 Glasgow	Team
Gold medal – first place	2018 Gold Coast	Team
Gold medal – first place	2022 Birmingham	Team
Oceania Cup
Gold medal – first place	2017 Sydney
Gold medal – first place	2019 Rockhampton
Gold medal – first place	2023 Whangārei
FIH Pro League
Gold medal – first place	2019 Amstelveen

Daniel James Beale (born 12 February 1993) is an Australian field hockey player. He competed in the men's hockey tournament at the 2014 Commonwealth Games where he won a gold medal.

Beale was selected in the Kookaburras Olympics squad for the Tokyo 2020 Olympics. The team reached the final for the first time since 2004 but could not achieve gold, beaten by Belgium in a shootout.
