= Hirotaka Zendana =

Japanese field hockey player

Personal information
- Born: 14 February 1993 (age 33) Shimane Prefecture, Japan
- Height: 1.75 m (5 ft 9 in)

Sport
- Sport: Field hockey
- Position: Defender
- Club: Adelaide Fire
Senior career
| Years | Team | Caps | Goals |
| 2019– | Adelaide Fire | 2 | 1 |
National team
| Years | Team | Caps | Goals |
| 2014– | Japan | 119 | (30) |
Medal record
Men's field hockey
Representing Japan
Asian Games
| Gold medal – first place | 2018 Jakarta | Team |
- Updated on 24 July 2021

Hirotaka Zendana (膳棚 大剛, Zendana Hirotaka; born 14 February 1993) is a Japanese field hockey player who plays as a defender for the Japanese national team.

== Career ==
=== Club level ===
In 2019, Zendana was signed to play for the Adelaide Fire men's team in Hockey Australia's new national league, the Sultana Bran Hockey One.

=== Senior national team ===
Zendana made his debut for the Japanese national team in 2014, during a test series against New Zealand in Wellington.

In 2018, Zendana won his first medal with the national team at the 2018 Asian Games in Jakarta. The team won gold after defeating Malaysia 3–1 in a shoot-out, to qualify for the 2020 Summer Olympics in Tokyo.
