= Nikkin Thimmaiah =

Indian field hockey player (born 1991)

Personal information
- Born: 18 January 1991 (age 35) Virajpet, Karnataka, India
- Height: 170 cm (5 ft 7 in)

Sport
- Sport: Field hockey
- Position: Forward
National team
Years	Team	Caps	Goals
2012–present	India	91	(17)
Medal record
Men's field hockey
Representing India
Asian Games
Gold medal – first place	2014 Incheon	Team
Asia Cup
Silver medal – second place	2013 Ipoh	Team
Asian Champions Trophy
Gold medal – first place	2016 Kuantan
Commonwealth Games
Silver medal – second place	2014 Glasgow	Team
Champions Trophy
Silver medal – second place	2016 London	Team
- Updated on 12 February 2017

Nikkin Thimmaiah (born 18 January 1991) is an Indian field hockey player who plays as a forward. He was named in the Indian squad for the 2016 Summer Olympics.
