= Fareed Ahmed =

Pakistani field hockey player (born 1989)

Personal information
- Nationality: Pakistani
- Born: 28 April 1989 (age 37) Pakistan

Sport
- Sport: Field hockey
- Club: HCAS
Medal record
Men's field hockey
Representing Pakistan
Champions Trophy
Bronze medal – third place	2012 Melbourne	Team
Asian Champions Trophy
Gold medal – first place	2012 Doha
Gold medal – first place	2013 Kakamigahara
Silver medal – second place	2011 Ordos City

Fareed Ahmed (born 28 April 1989, in Sialkot) is a field hockey player from Pakistan.

== Career ==
=== 2012 ===
Ahmed was included in the squad for the 2012 Olympic Games in London, UK playing in all six of Pakistan's games.

== See also ==
- Pakistan national field hockey team
