= Fitri Saari =

Malaysian field hockey player (born 1993)

Personal information
- Full name: Mohammad Fitri bin Saari
- Born: 4 March 1993 (age 33) Terengganu, Malaysia

Sport
- Sport: Field hockey
- Position: Midfielder
Senior career
Years	Team	Caps	Goals
2011–2012	Kuala Lumpur HC	-	-
2013–	Terengganu HT	-	-
2022	Metro Express Barishal	-	-
National team
Years	Team	Caps	Goals
2011–	Malaysia	137	-
Medal record
Men's field hockey
Representing Malaysia
Asian Games
Silver medal – second place	2018 Jakarta-Palembang	Team
Asia Cup
Silver medal – second place	2017 Dhaka
Bronze medal – third place	2025 Rajgir
Asian Champions Trophy
Silver medal – second place	2023 Chennai
Bronze medal – third place	2011 Ordos
Bronze medal – third place	2012 Doha
Bronze medal – third place	2016 Malaysia
Southeast Asian Games
Gold medal – first place	2017 Kuala Lumpur	Team

Mohammad Fitri bin Saari (born 4 March 1993) is a Malaysian field hockey player. He is the younger brother of Malaysian field hockey player Faizal Saari.

In 2011, he made his debut with the senior national team in the inaugural Asian Champions Trophy. In the same year he won the Sultan of Johor Cup with the Project 2013 squad scoring a goal in the final against Australia.
