= Lalit Upadhyay =

Indian field hockey player

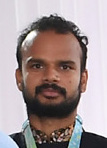
- Upadhyay in August 2022

Personal information
- Full name: Lalit Kumar Upadhyay
- Born: 1 December 1993 (age 32) Varanasi, Uttar Pradesh, India
- Height: 177 cm (5 ft 10 in)

Sport
- Sport: Field hockey
- Position: Midfielder / Forward
Senior career
Years	Team	Caps	Goals
–	Petroleum Sports Promotion Board	-	-
–	BPCL	-	-
–	Uttar Pradesh Police	-	-
National team
Years	Team	Caps	Goals
2014–2025	India	183	(45)
Medal record
Men's field hockey
Representing India
Olympic Games
Bronze medal – third place	2020 Tokyo	Team
Bronze medal – third place	2024 Paris	Team
Commonwealth Games
Silver medal – second place	2022 Birmingham	Team
Asian Games
Gold medal – first place	2022 Hangzhou	Team
Bronze medal – third place	2018 Jakarta	Team
Champions Trophy
Silver medal – second place	2018 Breda
World League
Bronze medal – third place	2016–17 Bhubaneswar	Team
Asia Cup
Gold medal – first place	2017 Dhaka
Asian Champions Trophy
Gold medal – first place	2016 Kuantan
Gold medal – first place	2018 Muscat
Bronze medal – third place	2021 Dhaka

Lalit Kumar Upadhyay (born 31 December 1993) is a former Indian field hockey player. He was a member of the Indian team that won bronze medals at both the 2020 and 2024 Olympic Games. In 2021, Upadhyay was honored with the Arjuna Award for his excellence in sports. He has been serving as a Deputy superintendent of police in the Uttar Pradesh Police since 2022.
