= Akashdeep Singh =

Indian field hockey player (born 1994)

Akashdeep singh
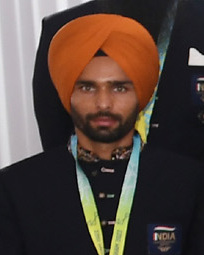
- Singh in August 2022

Personal information
- Born: 2 December 1994 (age 31) Tarn Taran, Punjab, India
- Spouse: Monika Malik (m. 2024)

Sport
- Sport: Field hockey
- Position: Midfielder
- Club: Punjab Armed Police
Youth career
- Team
- –: Guru Angad Dev Sports Club
- –: PAU Hockey Academy
- –: Surjit Hockey Academy
Senior career
Years	Team	Caps	Goals
2013–2015	Delhi Waveriders	-	-
2016–2017	Uttar Pradesh Wizards	-	-
2017–	Punjab Armed Police	-	-
National team
Years	Team	Caps	Goals
2013	India U21	40	(4)
2012–	India	247	(94)
Medal record
Men's field hockey
Representing India
Asian Games
Gold medal – first place	2014 Incheon	Team
Bronze medal – third place	2018 Jakarta	Team
Asia Cup
Gold medal – first place	2017 Dhaka
Champions Trophy
Silver medal – second place	2016 London
Hockey World League
Bronze medal – third place	2014-15 Raipur
Bronze medal – third place	2016-17 Bhubaneshwar
Commonwealth Games
Silver medal – second place	2014 Glasgow	Team
Silver medal – second place	2022 Birmingham	Team
Asian Champions Trophy
Gold medal – first place	2016 Kuantan
Gold medal – first place	2018 Muscat
Gold medal – first place	2023 Chennai
Silver medal – second place	2012 Doha
Bronze medal – third place	2021 Dhaka

Akashdeep Singh (born 2 December 1994) is an Indian field hockey player who plays as a forward for Uttar Pradesh Wizards in the Hockey India League and the India hockey team.

== Career ==
Born in Verowal, Tarn Taran, Punjab, Singh started to play hockey in secondary school before joining the Guru Angad Dev Sports Club. He then joined the PAU Hockey Academy in Ludhiana in 2006 before joining the Surjit Hockey Academy in Jalandhar. In 2013, Singh was auctioned to the Delhi Waveriders of the Hockey India League. After three seasons with Delhi, Singh was signed by the Uttar Pradesh Wizards for $84,000. As of Winter 2023, he was a student at the University of Alberta, in Canada, majoring in Biological And political sciences.

== International ==
Singh was the captain of the Indian junior team and has represented India senior side. He played at the Rio Olympics 2016. He made 33 international goals. Singh has represented India in the 2018 Commonwealth Games. At the 2018 Asian Champions Trophy, he was awarded the player of the tournament award.
