= Muhammad Irfan (field hockey) =

Pakistani field hockey player

Personal information
- Full name: Muhammad Irfan Sr.
- Born: 1 April 1990 (age 36) Toba Tek Singh, Pakistan

Sport
- Sport: Field hockey
- Position: Defender
Medal record
Men's field hockey
Representing Pakistan
Champions Trophy
Silver medal – second place	2014 Bhubaneswar
Asia Cup
Bronze medal – third place	2017 Dhaka
Asian Champions Trophy
Gold medal – first place	2012 Doha
Silver medal – second place	2011 Ordos City

Muhammad Irfan Sr. (born 1 April 1990) is a Pakistani field hockey player who plays as a defender for the Pakistan national team. He was a member of the Pakistan team at the 2010 Commonwealth Games in New Delhi, India. He has played in the 2010 World Cup and was selected for the 2018 World Cup. He also represented Pakistan at the 2012 Summer Olympics. He also played for Pakistan in the 2011 and 2014 Champions Trophy events. In 2010, Irfan faced a three-game suspension for pushing a South African player.
