= Kazuma Murata =

Japanese field hockey player

Personal information
- Born: 28 November 1991 (age 34) Toyama Prefecture, Japan
- Height: 175 cm (5 ft 9 in)
- Weight: 60 kg (132 lb)

Sport
- Sport: Field hockey
- Position: Forward
- Club: Canberra Chill
Senior career
Years	Team	Caps	Goals
2018	Canberra Lakers	6	0
2019–	Canberra Chill	3	0
National team
Years	Team	Caps	Goals
2014–present	Japan	133	(33)
Medal record
Men's field hockey
Representing Japan
Asian Games
Gold medal – first place	2018 Jakarta	Team
Asian Champions Trophy
Silver medal – second place	2021 Dhaka
- Updated on 31 December 2021

Kazuma Murata (村田 和麻, Murata Kazuma; born 28 November 1991) is a Japanese field hockey player, who plays as a forward.

== Career ==
=== Australian leagues ===
In 2018, Kazuma Murata was signed to the Canberra Lakers as an import player for the 2018 edition of the Australian Hockey League.

Following his appearance for the Canberra Lakers, Murata was signed to the Australian Capital Territory's new team, the Canberra Chill, for the inaugural tournament of the Sultana Bran Hockey One League.

=== National team ===
Murata made his debut for the Japan national team in 2014, during a test series against New Zealand in Wellington.

He won his first medal at a major tournament in 2018, at the Asian Games in Jakarta. The team won gold, and also secured qualification to the 2020 Summer Olympics in Tokyo.
