= Arslan Qadir =

Pakistani field hockey player

Personal information
- Full name: Muhammad Arslan Qadir
- Nationality: Pakistani
- Born: Dera Ghazi Khan, Pakistan

Sport
- Country: Pakistan
- Sport: Field hockey
Medal record
Men's field hockey
Representing Pakistan
Champions Trophy
| Silver medal – second place | 2014 Bhubaneswar |
Asia Cup
| Bronze medal – third place | 2017 Dhaka |

Muhammad Arslan Qadir known as Arslan Qadir (born 5 February 1994) is a Pakistani field hockey player.

== Background and family ==
Qadir belongs to Dera Ghazi Khan. His brother, Faisal has also represented Pakistan in hockey.

== Career ==
=== 2010 ===
At the Youth Olympics held in Singapore, Qadir emerged the joint top goal scorer with 10 goals and helped the team win a silver medal.

=== 2013 ===
Qadir made his senior debut during the Australian tour just before the Asian Champions Trophy in Japan. He was part of the 2013 Junior World Cup.

=== 2014 ===
Qadir was part of the team at the 2014 Champions Trophy held in Bhubaneswar, India. His 2 goals in the semi-final win over India earned him the man of the match award. Before the Champions Trophy, Qadir had earned 46 international caps.
