= Kenji Kitazato =

Japanese field hockey player (born 1989)

Personal information
- Born: 19 May 1989 (age 37) Kumamoto Prefecture, Japan
- Height: 1.74 m (5 ft 9 in)

Sport
- Sport: Field hockey
- Position: Forward
- Club: Alder Hanno
National team
Years	Team	Caps	Goals
2014–	Japan	162	(50)
Medal record
Men's field hockey
Representing Japan
Asian Games
Gold medal – first place	2018 Jakarta	Team

Kenji Kitazato (北里 謙治, Kitazato Kenji, born 19 May 1989) is a Japanese field hockey player. He competed in the 2020 Summer Olympics.

He was a part of the Japan squad which won their first Asian Games gold medal in hockey in 2018.
