= Field hockey at the 2014 Asian Games – Men's tournament =

Men's field hockey at the 2014 Asian Games
Tournament details
- Host country: South Korea
- City: Incheon
- Dates: 20 September – 2 October
- Teams: 10 (from 1 confederation)
- Venue: Seonhak Hockey Stadium

Final positions
- Champions: India (3rd title)
- Runner-up: Pakistan
- Third place: South Korea

Tournament statistics
- Matches played: 27
- Goals scored: 153 (5.67 per match)
- Top scorer(s): (Malaysia) Razie Rahim (South Korea) Jang Jong-hyun (9 goals)

The men's field hockey tournament at the 2014 Asian Games was the 15th edition of the field hockey event for men at the Asian Games. It was held alongside the women's tournament at the Seonhak Hockey Stadium in Incheon, South Korea from 20 September to 2 October 2014.

== Qualification ==
| Dates | Event | Location | Quotas | Qualifier(s) |
|---|---|---|---|---|
| —N/a | Host | —N/a | 1 | South Korea |
| 15–25 November 2010 | 2010 Asian Games | Guangzhou, China | 5 | China; India; Japan; Malaysia; Pakistan |
| 15–23 March 2014 | 2014 Asian Games Qualifying Tournament | Dhaka, Bangladesh | 4 | Bangladesh; Oman; Singapore; Sri Lanka |
| Total | | | 10 | |

== Squads ==
| Bangladesh | China | India | Japan |
|---|---|---|---|
| Hasan Jubair Niloy; Khorshadur Rahman; Tapos Barmon; Md Rokonuzzaman; Salman Sadik; Asim Gope; Moinul Islam Kowshik; Milon Hossain; Mamunur Rahman Chayan; Krishno Kumar Das; Pushkor Khisa Mimo; Sarower Hossain; Rabbi Salehin; Farhad Ahmed Shetul; Irfanul Haque; Abusayed Nippon | Zhang Zhixuan; Wang Zipeng; Meng Lei; Huang Yue; E Liguang; Ao Yang; Du Talake; Du Chen; Guo Xiaoping; Sun Long; Dong Yang; Sun Zhixin; Ao Weibao; Sun Tianjun; Yan Rongyao; Xu Rui | Rupinder Pal Singh; Kothajit Singh; Manpreet Singh; Sardara Singh; Dharamvir Singh; V. R. Raghunath; Gurbaj Singh; P. R. Sreejesh; Danish Mujtaba; Gurwinder Singh Chandi; S. V. Sunil; Birendra Lakra; Akashdeep Singh; Chinglensana Singh; Ramandeep Singh; Nikkin Thimmaiah | Katsuya Takase; Koji Kayukawa; Naoto Shiokawa; Tomonori Ono; Kenji Kitazato; Ippei Fujimoto; Yasuhiro Nakayama; Kei Kawakami; Katsuyoshi Nagasawa; Manabu Yamashita; Manabu Hatakeyama; Kenta Tanaka; Ryohei Kawakami; Hiroki Sakamoto; Koshi Yamabe; Toshiro Tachibana |
| Malaysia | Oman | Pakistan | Singapore |
| Marhan Jalil; Fitri Saari; Izwan Firdaus; Shahrun Nabil; Sukri Mutalib; Firhan Ashaari; Azlan Misron; Nabil Fiqri; Kumar Subramaniam; Razie Rahim; Faiz Helmi Jali; Meor Azuan; Tengku Ahmad Tajuddin; Ahmad Kazamirul Nasruddin; Shahril Saabah; Izad Hakimi Jamaluddin | Muhanna Al-Hasani; Ahmed Al-Nofali; Abdullah Al-Alawi; Mohammed Bait Jandal; Qasim Al-Shibli; Sami Al-Laun; Shafi Al-Shatari; Mahmood Bait Shamaiaa; Basim Rajab; Mohammed Bait Awadh; Mahmood Al-Hasani; Murshid Hawait; Khalid Al-Shaaibi; Ahmed Al-Balushi; Fahad Al-Nofali; Younis Al-Nofali | Imran Butt; Muhammad Imran; Muhammad Irfan; Ammad Shakeel Butt; Fareed Ahmed; Rashid Mehmood; Muhammad Waqas; Muhammad Umar Bhutta; Abdul Haseem Khan; Shafqat Rasool; Shakeel Abbasi; Muhammad Rizwan; Muhammad Tousiq; Muhammad Rizwan; Muhammad Dilber; Kashif Shah | A Suresh; Haseef Salim; Farhan Kamsani; Enrico Marican; Karleef Abdullah Sasi; Nur Ashriq Ferdaus; Silas Abdul Razak; Johnson Sivalingam; Ashraff Alias; Tan Yi Ru; Sabri Yuhari; Ishwarpal Singh Grewal; Baqir Asali; Hidayat Mat Rahim; Prashan Anbalagan; Ahmad Faris Johari |
| South Korea | Sri Lanka | | |
| Lee Myung-ho; Oh Dae-keun; Lee Nam-yong; Kang Moon-kweon; Lee Seung-il; Yoon Sung-hoon; You Hyo-sik; Jung Man-jae; Kang Moon-kyu; Hyun Hye-sung; Hong Eun-seong; Kim Young-jin; Lee Seung-hoon; Kim Seong-kyu; Jang Jong-hyun; Nam Hyun-woo | Ishanka Kumara; Dhammika Ranasinghe; Nalantha de Silva; Tharanga Irosha; Nuwan Anju Hewage; Lakshan Nanayakkara; Damith Madushanka; Mohamed Mulafer; Sandaruwan Priyalanka; Prassana Dissanayake; Dushan Milinda; Dinesh Maduranga; Lahiru Gihan Weerasooriya; Thusith Ratnasiri; Thilina Perera; Tharindu Hendeniya | | |

== Preliminary round ==
All times are Korea Standard Time (UTC+09:00)

=== Pool A ===
| Pos | Team | Pld | W | D | L | GF | GA | GD | Pts | Qualification |
|---|---|---|---|---|---|---|---|---|---|---|
| 1 | South Korea (H) | 4 | 4 | 0 | 0 | 25 | 1 | +24 | 12 | Semi-finals |
| 2 | Malaysia | 4 | 3 | 0 | 1 | 18 | 6 | +12 | 9 | Semi-finals |
| 3 | Japan | 4 | 2 | 0 | 2 | 22 | 8 | +14 | 6 | |
| 4 | Bangladesh | 4 | 1 | 0 | 3 | 3 | 21 | −18 | 3 | |
| 5 | Singapore | 4 | 0 | 0 | 4 | 3 | 35 | −32 | 0 | |

Source: FIH
(H) Hosts

20 September
13:00

| Japan | 8–0 | Bangladesh |
|---|---|---|
| Sakamoto 3', 49'; Ono 11'; Nagasawa 21', 56'; Tanaka 33', 43', 48' |

Seonhak Hockey Stadium, Incheon
Umpires:
Chen Dekang (CHN)
Jakub Mejzlík (CZE)

20 September
15:00

| Malaysia | 8–2 | Singapore |
|---|---|---|
| Rahim 2', 17', 35'; Saari 3'; Ashaari 30'; Tajuddin 37'; Firdaus 48'; Nabil 51' | | Marican 11'; Abdul Razak 28' |

Seonhak Hockey Stadium, Incheon
Umpires:
Haider Rasool (PAK)
Lam Ho Yeung (HKG)

21 September
13:00

| Malaysia | 5–1 | Bangladesh |
|---|---|---|
| Rahim 20', 60'; Jalil 46'; Firdaus 52'; Nabil 59' | | Das 30' |

Seonhak Hockey Stadium, Incheon
Umpires:
Simon Taylor (NZL)
Saleh Al-Balushi (OMA)

21 September
19:00

| South Korea | 12–0 | Singapore |
|---|---|---|
| Nam Hyun-woo 6', 29'; Kang Moon-kyu 14'; Yoon Sung-hoon 27'; You Hyo-sik 33', 47'; Jang Jong-hyun 34', 35', 44'; Kim Seong-kyu 54'; Hyun Hye-sung 54'; Lee Nam-yong 55' |

Seonhak Hockey Stadium, Incheon
Umpires:
Javed Nuruddin Shaikh (IND)
Mohomead Nawshad (SRI)

23 September
15:00

| Bangladesh | 2–1 | Singapore |
|---|---|---|
| Mimo 22'; Rahman 25' | | Tan Yi Ru 47' |

Seonhak Hockey Stadium, Incheon
Umpires:
Kim Hong-lae (KOR)
Javed Nuruddin Shaikh (IND)

23 September
19:00

| Japan | 0–4 | South Korea |
|---|---|---|
| | | Jang Jong-hyun 7', 34'; Nam Hyun-woo 15'; You Hyo-sik 33' |

Seonhak Hockey Stadium, Incheon
Umpires:
Simon Taylor (NZL)
Haider Rasool (PAK)

25 September
13:00

| Singapore | 0–13 | Japan |
|---|---|---|
| | | Tachibana 4', 48', 54'; Tanaka 5', 34', 52'; Kayukawa 8'; Fujimoto 25', 57'; Kitazato 37'; Nagasawa 39'; Sakamoto 46'; Ono 60' |

Seonhak Hockey Stadium, Incheon
Umpires:
Rahmatollah Mohammadi (IRI)
Saleh Al-Balushi (OMA)

25 September
19:00

| Malaysia | 1–2 | South Korea |
|---|---|---|
| Jalil 59' | | Nam Hyun-woo 24', 43' |

Seonhak Hockey Stadium, Incheon
Umpires:
Chen Dekang (CHN)
Javed Nuruddin Shaikh (IND)

27 September
15:00

| Japan | 1–4 | Malaysia |
|---|---|---|
| Tachibana 14' | | Ashaari 2'; Rahim 20', 39'; Firdaus 42' |

Seonhak Hockey Stadium, Incheon
Umpires:
Haider Rasool (PAK)
Jakub Mejzlík (CZE)

27 September
19:00

| South Korea | 7–0 | Bangladesh |
|---|---|---|
| Kim Seong-kyu 4'; Kang Moon-kweon 6'; Oh Dae-keun 19'; You Hyo-sik 30'; Jang Jong-hyun 42', 51'; Nam Hyun-woo 59' |

Seonhak Hockey Stadium, Incheon
Umpires:
Federico García (URU)
Mohomead Nawshad (SRI)

=== Pool B ===
| Pos | Team | Pld | W | D | L | GF | GA | GD | Pts | Qualification |
|---|---|---|---|---|---|---|---|---|---|---|
| 1 | Pakistan | 4 | 4 | 0 | 0 | 26 | 1 | +25 | 12 | Semi-finals |
| 2 | India | 4 | 3 | 0 | 1 | 18 | 2 | +16 | 9 | Semi-finals |
| 3 | China | 4 | 2 | 0 | 2 | 11 | 4 | +7 | 6 | |
| 4 | Oman | 4 | 1 | 0 | 3 | 3 | 21 | −18 | 3 | |
| 5 | Sri Lanka | 4 | 0 | 0 | 4 | 1 | 31 | −30 | 0 | |

Source: FIH

20 September
17:00

| Pakistan | 14–0 | Sri Lanka |
|---|---|---|
| Waqas 1'; Imran 2', 19', 25', 54'; Irfan 12', 14'; Rizwan Sr. 20', 45', 47'; Bhutta 21', 29', 39'; Tousiq 41' |

Seonhak Hockey Stadium, Incheon
Umpires:
Lim Hong Zhen (SGP)
Federico García (URU)

20 September
19:00

| Oman | 0–5 | China |
|---|---|---|
| | | Ao Yang 15', 40'; Sun Tianjun 29'; Du Chen 42'; Zhang Zhixuan 46' |

Seonhak Hockey Stadium, Incheon
Umpires:
Satoshi Kondo (JPN)
Salim Lucky (BAN)

21 September
15:00

| Pakistan | 2–0 | China |
|---|---|---|
| Khan 42'; Dilber 55' |

Seonhak Hockey Stadium, Incheon
Umpires:
Kim Hong-lae (KOR)
Jakub Mejzlík (CZE)

21 September
17:00

| India | 8–0 | Sri Lanka |
|---|---|---|
| Thimmaiah 6'; R.P. Singh 12', 45', 46'; Raghunath 15'; C. Singh 21'; R. Singh 28', 59' |

Seonhak Hockey Stadium, Incheon
Umpires:
Karuppusamy Lingam (MAS)
Rahmatollah Mohammadi (IRI)

23 September
13:00

| China | 6–0 | Sri Lanka |
|---|---|---|
| Ao Yang 3'; Sun Long 18'; Dong Yang 41'; Zhang Zhixuan 51'; E Liguang 52'; Guo Xiaoping 56' |

Seonhak Hockey Stadium, Incheon
Umpires:
Karuppusamy Lingam (MAS)
Lam Ho Yeung (HKG)

23 September
17:00

| Oman | 0–7 | India |
|---|---|---|
| | | R.P. Singh 18', 19'; A. Singh 33'; Raghunath 39', 60'; Sunil 54'; Mujtaba 60' |

Seonhak Hockey Stadium, Incheon
Umpires:
Lim Cheng (SGP)
Federico García (URU)

25 September
15:00

| Sri Lanka | 1–3 | Oman |
|---|---|---|
| Kumara 54' | | Bait Shamaiaa 17'; Bait Jandal 37'; Al-Shaaibi 45' |

Seonhak Hockey Stadium, Incheon
Umpires:
Satoshi Kondo (JPN)
Salim Lucky (BAN)

25 September
17:00

| India | 1–2 | Pakistan |
|---|---|---|
| Thimmaiah 53' | | Bhutta 38'; Waqas 54' |

Seonhak Hockey Stadium, Incheon
Umpires:
Simon Taylor (NZL)
Jakub Mejzlík (CZE)

27 September
13:00

| Oman | 0–8 | Pakistan |
|---|---|---|
| | | Imran 15', 43'; Dilber 17'; Irfan 20', 60'; Khan 23', 47'; Bhutta 38' |

Seonhak Hockey Stadium, Incheon
Umpires:
Lim Cheng (SGP)
Satoshi Kondo (JPN)

27 September
17:00

| India | 2–0 | China |
|---|---|---|
| Raghunath 40'; Lakra 45' |

Seonhak Hockey Stadium, Incheon
Umpires:
Kim Hong-lae (KOR)
Salim Lucky (BAN)

== Fifth to tenth place classification ==
=== Ninth and tenth place ===
29 September
11:30

| Singapore | 5–3 | Sri Lanka |
|---|---|---|
| Abdul Razak 6'; Johari 9'; Yuhari 21'; Marican 33'; Ferdaus 58' | | Priyalanka 31'; Hewage 43', 54' |

Seonhak Hockey Stadium, Incheon
Umpires:
Saleh Al-Balushi (OMA)
Rahmatollah Mohammadi (IRI)

=== Seventh and eighth place ===
30 September
14:00

| Bangladesh | 2–3 | Oman |
|---|---|---|
| Mimo 11'; Das 39' | | Al-Balushi 33'; Al-Shibli 37'; Rajab 45' |

Seonhak Hockey Stadium, Incheon
Umpires:
Javed Nuruddin Shaikh (IND)
Lam Ho Yeung (HKG)

=== Fifth and sixth place ===
2 October
14:00

| Japan | 1–1 | China |
|---|---|---|
| Kawakami 16' | | Zhang Zhixuan 35' |
Penalties
| Nakayama (penalty shoot-out missed); Ono (penalty shoot-out scored); Tanaka (penalty shoot-out scored); Tachibana (penalty shoot-out scored); Fujimoto (penalty shoot-out missed); Ono (penalty shoot-out missed) | 3–4 | (penalty shoot-out missed) Du Chen; (penalty shoot-out scored) Sun Long; (penalty shoot-out scored) Meng Lei; (penalty shoot-out missed) E Liguang; (penalty shoot-out scored) Sun Tianjun; (penalty shoot-out scored) Du Chen |

Seonhak Hockey Stadium, Incheon
Umpires:
Karuppusamy Lingam (MAS)
Mohomead Nawshad (SRI)

== Medal round ==
=== Bracket ===
Semi-finals
30 September
South Korea | 0
India | 1
30 September
Pakistan (s.o.) | 0 (6)
Malaysia | 0 (5)

Gold medal match
2 October
India (s.o.) | 1 (4)
Pakistan | 1 (2)
Bronze medal match
2 October
South Korea | 3
Malaysia | 2

=== Semi-finals ===
30 September
16:30

| South Korea | 0–1 | India |
|---|---|---|
| | | A. Singh 44' |

Seonhak Hockey Stadium, Incheon
Umpires:
Jakub Mejzlík (CZE)
Satoshi Kondo (JPN)

30 September
19:00

| Pakistan | 0–0 | Malaysia |
Penalties
| Rizwan Sr. (penalty shoot-out missed); Waqas (penalty shoot-out scored); Khan (penalty shoot-out scored); Mehmood (penalty shoot-out scored); Bhutta (penalty shoot-out missed); Khan (penalty shoot-out scored); Waqas (penalty shoot-out scored); Mehmood (penalty shoot-out scored) | 6–5 | (penalty shoot-out missed) Tajuddin; (penalty shoot-out missed) Ashaari; (penalty shoot-out scored) Jalil; (penalty shoot-out scored) Saabah; (penalty shoot-out scored) Saari; (penalty shoot-out scored) Saari; (penalty shoot-out scored) Saabah; (penalty shoot-out missed) Tajuddin |

Seonhak Hockey Stadium, Incheon
Umpires:
Simon Taylor (NZL)
Chen Dekang (CHN)

=== Bronze medal match ===
2 October
16:30

| South Korea | 3–2 | Malaysia |
|---|---|---|
| Jang Jong-hyun 19', 43'; Kim Young-jin 30' | | Rahim 34', 44' |

Seonhak Hockey Stadium, Incheon
Umpires:
Javed Nuruddin Shaikh (IND)
Haider Rasool (PAK)

=== Gold medal match ===
2 October
19:00

| India | 1–1 | Pakistan |
|---|---|---|
| Kothajit Khadangbam 27' | | Rizwan Sr. 3' |
Penalties
| A. Singh (penalty shoot-out scored); R.P. Singh (penalty shoot-out scored); M. Singh (penalty shoot-out missed); Lakra (penalty shoot-out scored); D. Singh (penalty shoot-out scored) | 4–2 | (penalty shoot-out missed) Khan; (penalty shoot-out scored) Waqas; (penalty shoot-out missed) Bhutta; (penalty shoot-out scored) Rasool |

Seonhak Hockey Stadium, Incheon
Umpires:
Simon Taylor (NZL)
Jakub Mejzlík (CZE)

== Final standings ==
| Pos | Team | Qualification |
|---|---|---|
| 1st place, gold medalist(s) | India | 2016 Summer Olympics |
| 2nd place, silver medalist(s) | Pakistan | |
| 3rd place, bronze medalist(s) | South Korea (H) | |
| 4 | Malaysia | |
| 5 | China | |
| 6 | Japan | |
| 7 | Oman | |
| 8 | Bangladesh | |
| 9 | Singapore | |
| 10 | Sri Lanka | |

Source: FIH
(H) Host
