= 2010–11 Malaysia Hockey League =

2010-11 Malaysia Hockey League
Tournament details
- Host country: Malaysia
- Teams: 8

Final positions
- Champions: KL Hockey Club (2nd title)
- Runner-up: Tenaga Nasional Berhad HC
- Third place: Sapura HC

Tournament statistics
- Top scorer(s): (Malaysia) Muhammad Razie Abd Rahim (26 goals)
- Best player: (Malaysia) Tengku Ahmad Tajuddin Abdul Jalil

The 2010-11 Malaysia Hockey League kicked off on 3 December 2010 and concluded on 19 March 2011.

== Teams ==
Nine teams competed in the Premier Division, an increase of three teams from the previous year, while seven teams competed in Division One.

- (Federal Territories of Malaysia) Tenaga Nasional Berhad HC
- (Federal Territories of Malaysia) Sapura HC
- (Negeri Sembilan) Maybank HC
- (Federal Territories of Malaysia) UniKL-TRC HC
- (Federal Territories of Malaysia) KL Hockey Club (formerly known as Ernst & Young HC)
- (Penang) Nur Insafi HC
- (Federal Territories of Malaysia) Armed Forces-Airod HC
- (Selangor) UiTM HC
- Yayasan Negeri Sembilan HC

== Results ==
=== Premier ===
Team	Pld	W	D	L	GF	GA	GD	Pts
(Federal Territories of Malaysia) KL Hockey Club	16	14	1	1	75	20	+55	43
(Federal Territories of Malaysia) TNB	16	11	1	4	46	20	+26	34
(Federal Territories of Malaysia) Sapura	16	11	0	5	48	29	+19	33
(Federal Territories of Malaysia) UniKL-TRC	16	9	3	4	30	27	+3	30
Yayasan Negeri Sembilan	16	8	0	8	49	44	+5	24
(Negeri Sembilan) Maybank	16	4	3	9	21	30	−9	15
(Penang) Nur Insafi	16	4	2	10	27	51	−24	14
(Selangor) UiTM	16	3	0	13	21	53	−32	9
(Federal Territories of Malaysia) Armed Forces-Airod	16	3	0	13	19	62	−43	9

=== Division 1 ===
Pos	Team	Pld	W	D	L	GF	GA	GD	Pts
1	(Federal Territories of Malaysia) Armed Forces-Airod	12	9	2	1	31	12	+19	29
2	(Johor) BPSS-Thunderbolt	12	8	0	4	27	19	+8	24
3	(Federal Territories of Malaysia) BJSS	12	7	1	4	33	15	+18	22
4	Malacca City Council	12	5	1	6	16	16	0	16
5	(Perak) Ipoh City Hall	12	4	3	5	19	24	–5	15
6	(Penang) USM	12	3	0	9	18	36	–18	9
7	(Selangor) Uniten	12	1	3	8	12	34	–22	7

=== First to eighth place classification ===
4 March 2011
16:00

(Federal Territories of Malaysia) KL Hockey Club	11 − 2	(Johor) BPSS-Thunderbolt

4 March 2011
17:00

Yayasan Negeri Sembilan HC	4 − 2	(Federal Territories of Malaysia) UniKL-TRC HC

4 March 2011
18:00

(Federal Territories of Malaysia) Armed Forces Juniors	0 − 6	(Federal Territories of Malaysia) Tenaga Nasional Berhad HC

4 March 2011
20:00

(Federal Territories of Malaysia) Sapura HC	3 − 0	(Negeri Sembilan) Maybank HC

Quarter-finals
1	(Federal Territories of Malaysia) KL Hockey Club	11	15	26
8	(Johor) BPSS-Thunderbolt	2	1	3
4	Yayasan Negeri Sembilan HC	4	5	9
5	(Federal Territories of Malaysia) UniKL-TRC HC	2	3	5
2	(Federal Territories of Malaysia) Armed Forces Juniors	0	4	4
7	(Federal Territories of Malaysia) Tenaga Nasional Berhad HC	6	5	11
3	(Federal Territories of Malaysia) Sapura HC	3	5	8
6	(Negeri Sembilan) Maybank HC	0	1	1

Semi-finals
(Federal Territories of Malaysia) KL Hockey Club	2	4	6
Yayasan Negeri Sembilan HC	1	2	3
(Federal Territories of Malaysia) Tenaga Nasional Berhad HC	2	0	2
(Federal Territories of Malaysia) Sapura HC	2	2	4

Final
(Federal Territories of Malaysia) KL Hockey Club
(Federal Territories of Malaysia) Sapura HC
