= 2014 Men's Hockey Champions Challenge I =

Field hockey tournament

Tournament details
- Host country: Malaysia
- City: Kuantan
- Dates: 26 April – 4 May
- Teams: 8 (from 4 confederations)
- Venue: Stadium Hoki Wisma Belia

Final positions
- Champions: South Korea (1st title)
- Runner-up: Canada
- Third place: Malaysia

Tournament statistics
- Matches played: 24
- Goals scored: 128 (5.33 per match)
- Top scorer: (South Korea) Jang Jong-hyun (8 goals)
- Best player: (South Korea) Jang Jong-hyun
- Best young player: (Canada) Gabriel Ho-Garcia
- Best goalkeeper: (Ireland) David Harte

The 2014 Men's Hockey Champions Challenge I was the eighth and last edition of the Men's Hockey Champions Challenge I. It was held from 26 April to 4 May 2014 in Kuantan, Malaysia. The tournament doubled as the qualifier to the 2016 Champions Trophy as the winner earned an automatic berth to compete.

The tournament was created by the International Hockey Federation in 2001 to broaden hockey's competitive base globally and featured the 8 teams just behind the top six teams in the world.

South Korea won the tournament for the first time after defeating Canada 4–0 in the final, earning an automatic berth at the 2016 Champions Trophy after their absence in the previous two editions. Malaysia won the third place match by defeating Ireland 4–2 to claim their first ever Champions Challenge I medal. This was the last edition of the tournament that was held. The tournament was replaced by the FIH Hockey World League in the hockey calendar.

== Qualification ==
Even though Spain was automatically qualified as the highest ranked team not qualified for the next Champions Trophy or Champions Challenge I (this due to the withdrawal from participating at the 2012 Champions Trophy), they withdrew from participating. In addition, South Africa qualified as the seventh placed team in the previous edition, but also withdrew due to financial issues. Both teams were replaced by Poland and France, respectively. The following eight teams competed in this tournament.

- Malaysia (Host nation)
- New Zealand (Seventh in 2012 Champions Trophy)
- South Korea (Second in 2012 Champions Challenge I)
- Ireland (Third in 2012 Champions Challenge I)
- Japan (Fifth in 2012 Champions Challenge I)
- Canada (Sixth in 2012 Champions Challenge I)
- Poland (Eighth in 2012 Champions Challenge I)
- France (Highest ranked team not qualified for the next Champions Trophy or Champions Challenge I)

== Preliminary round ==
All times are Malaysia Standard Time (UTC+08:00)

=== Pool A ===
| Pos | Team | Pld | W | D | L | GF | GA | GD | Pts |
|---|---|---|---|---|---|---|---|---|---|
| 1 | New Zealand | 3 | 3 | 0 | 0 | 16 | 5 | +11 | 9 |
| 2 | Ireland | 3 | 1 | 0 | 2 | 3 | 4 | −1 | 3 |
| 3 | Poland | 3 | 1 | 0 | 2 | 7 | 12 | −5 | 3 |
| 4 | Japan | 3 | 1 | 0 | 2 | 4 | 9 | −5 | 3 |

Source: FIH

26 April 2014
15:00

| New Zealand | 2 – 1 | Ireland |
|---|---|---|
| Edwards 11'; Inglis 42' | Report | Sothern 16' |

Umpires:
Eduardo Lizana (ESP)
You Suolong (CHN)

26 April 2014
17:00

| Japan | 3 – 2 | Poland |
|---|---|---|
| Kayukawa 8'; Fujimoto 50'; Sakamoto 61' | Report | Raciniewski 7'; Krokosz 29' |

Umpires:
Gregory Uyttenhove (BEL)
Ilanggo Kanabathu (MAS)

27 April 2014
15:00

| Japan | 1 – 6 | New Zealand |
|---|---|---|
| Fujimoto 52' | Report | Edwards 5'; Russell 11', 38'; Shaw 19'; S. Child 34'; Jenness 59' |

Umpires:
Bruce Bale (ENG)
Geoff Conn (IRL)

27 April 2014
17:00

| Ireland | 1 – 2 | Poland |
|---|---|---|
| Elliott 37' | Report | Makowski 18'; Bratkowski 67' |

Umpires:
Diego Barbas (ARG)
Ilanggo Kanabathu(MAS)

29 April 2014
17:00

| Ireland | 1 – 0 | Japan |
|---|---|---|
| Sothern 66' | Report |

Umpires:
Michael Eilmer (AUT)
Gregory Uyttenhove (BEL)

29 April 2014
19:00

| New Zealand | 8 – 3 | Poland |
|---|---|---|
| S. Child 4', 45', 56'; Hayward 8', 33'; Jenness 31'; Hilton 51'; Inglis 63' | Report | Górny 57'; Makowski 68', 70' |

Umpires:
Ilanggo Kanabathu (MAS)
Ayden Shrives (RSA)

=== Pool B ===
| Pos | Team | Pld | W | D | L | GF | GA | GD | Pts |
|---|---|---|---|---|---|---|---|---|---|
| 1 | South Korea | 3 | 2 | 1 | 0 | 9 | 6 | +3 | 7 |
| 2 | Canada | 3 | 1 | 1 | 1 | 9 | 9 | 0 | 4 |
| 3 | France | 3 | 1 | 0 | 2 | 7 | 8 | −1 | 3 |
| 4 | Malaysia (H) | 3 | 1 | 0 | 2 | 7 | 9 | −2 | 3 |

Source: FIH
(H) Hosts

26 April 2014
19:00

| South Korea | 3–3 | Canada |
|---|---|---|
| Cho 13'; Nam 24'; Kim S. 39' | Report | Ho-Garcia 25'; Curran 60'; Guest 63' |

Umpires:
Ayden Shrives (RSA)
David Tomlinson (NZL)

26 April 2014
21:00

| Malaysia | 2–3 | France |
|---|---|---|
| Tengku 41'; Faizal 50' | Report | Sánchez 34'; Charlet 53'; H. Genestet 64' |

Umpires:
Geoff Conn (IRL)
Diego Barbas (ARG)

27 April 2014
19:00

| Canada | 3–2 | France |
|---|---|---|
| Tupper 4'; Wright 43'; Smythe 58' | Report | Charlet 14', 64' |

Umpires:
Michael Eilmer (AUT)
You Suolong (CHN)

27 April 2014
21:00

| Malaysia | 1–3 | South Korea |
|---|---|---|
| Ismail 69' | Report | Nam 20'; You 37'; Jang 50' |

Umpires:
Gregory Uyttenhove (BEL)
Eduardo Lizana (ESP)

29 April 2014
15:00

| South Korea | 3–2 | France |
|---|---|---|
| Nam 24'; Jang 35'; Kim. S 56' | Report | T. Genestet 43'; Kieffer 63' |

Umpires:
Bruce Bale (ENG)
Diego Barbas (ARG)

29 April 2014
21:00

| Canada | 3–4 | Malaysia |
|---|---|---|
| Tupper 4', 54'; Ho-Garcia 30' | Report | Tengku 5', 55'; Shahril 19', 40' |

Umpires:
Eduardo Lizana (ESP)
David Tomlinson (NZL)

== Second round ==
=== Bracket ===
Quarter-finals
1 May
New Zealand | 4 (2)
Malaysia (s.o.) | 4 (3)
1 May
Canada | 3
Poland | 2
1 May
Ireland (s.o.) | 2 (3)
France | 2 (0)
1 May
South Korea | 5
Japan | 1

Semi-finals
3 May
Malaysia | 2 (4)
Canada (s.o.) | 2 (5)
3 May
Ireland | 1
South Korea | 2

Final
4 May
Canada | 0
South Korea | 4
Third place
4 May
Malaysia | 4
Ireland | 2

=== Quarter-finals ===
1 May 2014
14:45

| New Zealand | 4 – 4 | Malaysia |
|---|---|---|
| Edwards 4'; Hayward 45', 60', 70' | Report | Azlan 20'; Shahril 23', 31'; Fitri 24' |
Penalties
| Inglis (penalty shoot-out scored); Hilton (penalty shoot-out scored); S. Child (penalty shoot-out missed); Edwards (penalty shoot-out missed); Burrows (penalty shoot-out missed) | 2 – 3 | (penalty shoot-out missed) Faizal; (penalty shoot-out missed) Faiz; (penalty shoot-out scored) Firhan; (penalty shoot-out scored) Shahril; (penalty shoot-out scored) Fitri |

Umpires:
Geoff Conn (IRL)
Ayden Shrives (RSA)

1 May 2014
17:00

| Canada | 3 – 2 | Poland |
|---|---|---|
| Smythe 29'; Guest 54'; Wright 60' | Report | Majchrzak 22'; Makowski 47' |

Umpires:
Gregory Uyttenhove (BEL)
You Suolong (CHN)

1 May 2014
19:15

| Ireland | 2 – 2 | France |
|---|---|---|
| Sothern 2'; Dowds 64' | Report | Deront 41'; M. Genestet 50' |
Penalties
| Jackson (penalty shoot-out missed); Magee (penalty shoot-out scored); Brown (penalty shoot-out scored); Sothern (penalty shoot-out scored) | 3 – 0 | (penalty shoot-out missed) Baumgarten; (penalty shoot-out missed) Deront; (penalty shoot-out missed) Martin-Brisac |

Umpires:
Eduardo Lizana (ESP)
David Tomlinson (NZL)

1 May 2014
21:30

| South Korea | 5 – 1 | Japan |
|---|---|---|
| Hyun Hye-sung 11'; Jang Jong-hyun 24', 40', 49'; Nam Hyun-woo 59' | Report | Yoshihara 63' |

Umpires:
Bruce Bale (ENG)
Diego Barbas (ARG)

=== Fifth to eighth place classification ===
Cross-overs
3 May
New Zealand | 6
Poland | 1
3 May
France | 3
Japan | 2

Fifth place
4 May
New Zealand | 6
France | 3
Seventh place
4 May
Poland | 2
Japan | 3

==== Cross-overs ====
3 May 2014
14:45

| New Zealand | 6 – 1 | Poland |
|---|---|---|
| Hayward 8', 26'; Burrows 20', 23'; Panchia 30'; S. Child 43' | Report | Chwalisz 50' |

Umpires:
Michael Eilmer (AUT)
Diego Barbas (ARG)

3 May 2014
17:00

| France | 3 – 2 | Japan |
|---|---|---|
| Baumgarten 5'; Charlet 26'; Kieffer 66' | Report | Kayukawa 24'; Hatakeyama 51' |

Umpires:
Geoff Conn (IRL)
Bruce Bale (ENG)

==== Seventh and eighth place ====
4 May 2014
14:45

| Poland | 2 – 3 | Japan |
|---|---|---|
| Bratkowski 28'; Raciniewski 50' | Report | Tachibana 18', 29'; Kawauchi 43' |

Umpires:
Bruce Bale (ENG)
Michael Eilmer (AUT)

==== Fifth and sixth place ====
4 May 2014
17:00

| New Zealand | 6 – 3 | France |
|---|---|---|
| Jenness 21'; S. Child 27'; Burrows 34'; Shaw 43'; Panchia 49'; Inglis 68' | Report | Durchon 31'; T. Genestet 58'; M. Genestet 63' |

Umpires:
Geoff Conn (IRL)
Ayden Shrives (RSA)

=== First to fourth place classification ===
==== Semi-finals ====
3 May 2014
19:15

| Malaysia | 2 – 2 | Canada |
|---|---|---|
| Faizal 3'; Ismail 15' | Report | Tupper 21', 60' |
Penalties
| Faizal (penalty shoot-out scored); Faiz (penalty shoot-out scored); Firhan (penalty shoot-out missed); Shahril (penalty shoot-out missed); Fitri (penalty shoot-out missed); Faizal (penalty shoot-out scored); Fitri (penalty shoot-out scored); Faiz (penalty shoot-out missed) | 4 – 5 | (penalty shoot-out missed) Guest; (penalty shoot-out scored) Pearson; (penalty shoot-out missed) Tupper; (penalty shoot-out missed) Froese; (penalty shoot-out scored) Johnston; (penalty shoot-out scored) Pearson; (penalty shoot-out scored) Johnston; (penalty shoot-out scored) Froese |

Umpires:
You Suolong (CHN)
David Tomlinson (NZL)

3 May 2014
21:30

| Ireland | 1 – 2 | South Korea |
|---|---|---|
| Cargo 64' | Report | Jang Jong-hyun 3'; Hyun Hye-sung 53' |

Umpires:
Eduardo Lizana (ESP)
Ayden Shrives (RSA)

==== Third and fourth place ====
4 May 2014
19:15

| Malaysia | 4 – 2 | Ireland |
|---|---|---|
| Nasruddin 7'; Baharom 11'; Azlan 66'; Firhan 70' | Report | Gleghorne 22'; Cargo 43' |

Umpires:
Gregory Uyttenhove (BEL)
You Suolong (CHN)

==== Final ====
4 May 2014
21:30

| Canada | 0 – 4 | South Korea |
|---|---|---|
| | Report | Jang Jong-hyun 10', 56'; Kim Young-jin 13'; Kim Seong-kyu 69' |

Umpires:
Eduardo Lizana (ESP)
David Tomlinson (NZL)

== Statistics ==
=== Final ranking ===
1. South Korea
2. Canada
3. Malaysia
4. Ireland
5. New Zealand
6. France
7. Japan
8. Poland

=== Awards ===
Post tournament awards.

| Top Goalscorer | Player of the Tournament | Goalkeeper of the Tournament | Junior Player of the Tournament |
|---|---|---|---|
| (South Korea) Jang Jong-hyun | (South Korea) Jang Jong-hyun | (Ireland) David Harte | (Canada) Gabriel Ho-Garcia |

== See also ==
- 2014 Men's Hockey Champions Trophy
- 2014 Women's Hockey Champions Challenge I
