= Field hockey at the 2010 Asian Games – Men's tournament =

Men at the 2010 Asian Games
- Venue: Aoti Hockey Field
- Date: 15 November 2010 – 25 November 2010
- Competitors: 160 from 10 nations

Medalists
gold medal	Pakistan (8th title)
silver medal	Malaysia
bronze medal	India

The men's field hockey tournament at the 2010 Asian Games was held in Guangzhou, China, from November 15 to November 25, 2010.

== Squads ==
Bangladesh	China	Hong Kong	India
Zahid Hossain; Mamunur Rahman Chayan; Moshiur Rahman Biplob; Imran Hasan Pinto; Sheikh Md Nannu; Pushkor Khisa Mimo; Rasel Mahmud Jimmy; Krishno Kumar Das; Mosharraf Hossain Kuti; Imran Ahmed Riaz; Tapos Barmon; Enamul Kabir; Kamruzzaman Rana; Maksud Alam; Hosne Mobarak Sumon; Rafiqul Islam	Sun Tianjun; Liu Yixian; Cui Yongxin; Luo Fangming; De Yunze; Jiang Xishang; Song Yi; Lu Fenghui; Liu Xiantang; Meng Jun; Na Yubo; Sun Long; Dong Yang; Xu Rui; Su Rifeng; Hu Huiren	Howard Leung; Akbar Ali; Chan Ka Ho; Dev Singh Dillon; Aman Singh Dillon; Asif Ali; Harinder Singh Bal; Swalikh Mohammed; Jasbir Singh Chhina; Arif Ali; Asghar Ali; Inderpal Singh; Mustafa Mohammed; Noman Zakir; Kieran Smith; Rashid Mehmood Raja	Bharat Chettri; Bharat Chikara; Danish Mujtaba; Sandeep Singh; Arjun Halappa; Prabodh Tirkey; Dhananjay Mahadik; Sardara Singh; Dharamvir Singh; Ravipal Singh; Sarvanjit Singh; Shivendra Singh; Gurbaj Singh; Tushar Khandker; Rajpal Singh; Vikram Pillay
Japan	Malaysia	Oman	Pakistan
Kazuyuki Ozawa; Takayasu Mizawa; Koji Kayukawa; Naoto Shiokawa; Genki Mitani; Shunsuke Nagaoka; Manabu Hatakeyama; Takahiko Yamabori; Yoshihiro Anai; Kenji Kitazato; Kazuhiro Tsubouchi; Katsuyoshi Nagasawa; Kei Kawakami; Katsuya Takase; Tomonori Ono; Hiroki Sakamoto	Roslan Jamaluddin; Baljit Singh Charun; Hafifihafiz Hanafi; Izwan Firdaus; Mohd Amin Rahim; Marhan Jalil; Faizal Saari; Azreen Rizal; Madzli Ikmar; Tengku Ahmad Tajuddin; Nabil Fiqri; Sukri Mutalib; Razie Rahim; Azlan Misron; Shahrun Nabil; Kumar Subramaniam	Mohammed Bait Jandal; Murshid Hawait; Waleed Al-Hasani; Marwan Al-Raisi; Hussain Al-Qasmi; Younis Al-Nofali; Shakir Al-Loun; Hussain Al-Hasani; Samir Al-Shibli; Basim Rajab; Yousuf Al-Riyami; Hashim Al-Shatri; Akram Bait Shamiah; Salah Al-Saadi; Abduljabbar Al-Balushi; Asim Siddiq	Zeeshan Ashraf; Muhammad Zubair; Waseem Ahmed; Muhammad Irfan; Muhammad Imran; Shakeel Abbasi; Rehan Butt; Muhammad Rizwan; Salman Akbar; Abdul Haseem Khan; Fareed Ahmed; Muhammad Waqas; Shafqat Rasool; Muhammad Rashid; Muhammad Tousiq; Sohail Abbas
Singapore	South Korea		
Robin Ng; Saifulnizam Seftu; Kelvin Lim; Ishak Ismail; Farhan Suhaili; Harjeet Singh; Sabri Yuhari; Tan Yi Ru; Hazmi Ibrahim; Ian Vanderput; Prashan Anbalagan; Baqir Asali; Farhan Kamsani; Enrico Marican; Chia Kai Bin; Zulkarnain Salim	Lee Myung-ho; Lee Seung-il; Nam Hyun-woo; Lee Nam-yong; Seo Jong-ho; Hong Sung-kweon; Yoon Sung-hoon; You Hyo-sik; Yeo Woon-kon; Hyun Hye-sung; Kang Moon-kyu; Kim Jae-hyeon; Hong Eun-seong; Kim Young-jin; Kim Seong-kyu; Jang Jong-hyun		

== Results ==
All times are China Standard Time (UTC+08:00)

=== Preliminary ===
==== Group A ====
Team	Pld	W	D	L	GF	GA	GD	Pts
South Korea	4	3	1	0	25	4	+21	10
Malaysia	4	3	1	0	21	6	+15	10
China	4	2	0	2	12	7	+5	6
Oman	4	1	0	3	4	28	−24	3
Singapore	4	0	0	4	2	19	−17	0

15 November
15:30

Malaysia	3–0	Singapore
Hanafi 7'; Misron 33'; R. Rahim 35'

Aoti Hockey Field, Guangzhou
Umpires:
Yohsuke Totsuka (JPN)
Haider Rasool (PAK)

15 November
19:30

China	7–0	Oman
Song Yi 13'; Liu Yixian 22', 25', 42'; De Yunze 24'; Sun Long 53'; Dong Yang 59'

Aoti Hockey Field, Guangzhou
Umpires:
Virender Singh (IND)
John Hrytsak (CAN)

16 November
18:00

South Korea	8–0	Oman
Seo Jong-ho 1'; Hyun Hye-sung 3', 61'; Nam Hyun-woo 6', 50'; Jang Jong-hyun 39'; You Hyo-sik 47'; Lee Nam-yong 63'

Aoti Hockey Field, Guangzhou
Umpires:
Raghu Prasad (IND)
Adam Kearns (AUS)

16 November
20:00

China	2–0	Singapore
Lu Fenghui 57'; Liu Yixian 65'

Aoti Hockey Field, Guangzhou
Umpires:
Simon Taylor (NZL)
Thani Al-Wahabi (OMA)

18 November
14:30

Singapore	1–2	Oman
Marican 6'		Bait Jandal 55'; Al-Shibli 59'

Aoti Hockey Field, Guangzhou
Umpires:
Adam Kearns (AUS)
Yohsuke Totsuka (JPN)

18 November
17:30

Malaysia	2–2	South Korea
Misron 24'; Hanafi 48'		Hyun Hye-sung 9'; Seo Jong-ho 65'

Aoti Hockey Field, Guangzhou
Umpires:
Haider Rasool (PAK)
Raghu Prasad (IND)

19 November
18:00

Oman	2–12	Malaysia
Al-Shatri 40'; Bait Jandal 63'		Jalil 8'; Tajuddin 15'; A. Rahim 19', 60'; R. Rahim 22'; Hanafi 24'; Misron 25', 55', 69'; Saari 33', 61'; Firdaus 45'

Aoti Hockey Field, Guangzhou
Umpires:
Kim Hong-lae (KOR)
Virender Singh (IND)

19 November
20:00

China	1–3	South Korea
Song Yi 2'		Jang Jong-hyun 10', 27'; You Hyo-sik 34'

Aoti Hockey Field, Guangzhou
Umpires:
Adam Kearns (AUS)
Raghu Prasad (IND)

21 November
15:30

South Korea	12–1	Singapore
Seo Jong-ho 1', 13', 53'; You Hyo-sik 20'; Jang Jong-hyun 28', 65'; Nam Hyun-woo 34', 45', 62'; Kim Young-jin 44'; Yeo Woon-kon 59'; Yoon Sung-hoon 63'		Yuhari 22'

Aoti Hockey Field, Guangzhou
Umpires:
Virender Singh (IND)
Yohsuke Totsuka (JPN)

21 November
19:30

Malaysia	4–2	China
A. Rahim 2'; Saari 18'; Hanafi 41'; Misron 66'		Liu Yixian 13'; Na Yubo 36'

Aoti Hockey Field, Guangzhou
Umpires:
Simon Taylor (NZL)
Haider Rasool (PAK)

==== Group B ====
Team	Pld	W	D	L	GF	GA	GD	Pts
India	4	4	0	0	22	4	+18	12
Pakistan	4	3	0	1	28	6	+22	9
Japan	4	2	0	2	13	13	0	6
Bangladesh	4	1	0	3	9	21	−12	3
Hong Kong	4	0	0	4	4	32	−28	0

15 November
14:30

India	7–0	Hong Kong
Chikara 2'; San. Singh 4', 18'; Sarv. Singh 22'; Khandker 37'; Halappa 38'; Sh. Singh 48'

Aoti Hockey Field, Guangzhou
Umpires:
Jang Jung-min (KOR)
Lim Hong Zhen (SGP)

15 November
17:30

Japan	3–1	Bangladesh
Yamabori 47'; Nagasawa 56'; Ozawa 69'		Das 9'

Aoti Hockey Field, Guangzhou
Umpires:
Ilanggo Kanabathu (MAS)
Chen Dekang (CHN)

17 November
13:00

India	9–0	Bangladesh
Khandker 2', 39'; San. Singh 13', 47', 63', 66'; Sh. Singh 22'; R. Singh 37'; D. Singh 69'

Aoti Hockey Field, Guangzhou
Umpires:
Kim Hong-lae (KOR)
Lim Hong Zhen (SGP)

17 November
15:00

Pakistan	12–0	Hong Kong
Butt 2', 58'; Abbas 8', 29'; F. Ahmed 22'; Waqas 24', 50', 53'; Khan 31', 55'; Imran 35', 61'

Aoti Hockey Field, Guangzhou
Umpires:
Thani Al-Wahabi (OMA)
John Hrytsak (CAN)

18 November
15:30

Bangladesh	7–3	Hong Kong
Jimmy 16', 54'; Chayan 21', 35', 38', 46'; Alam 52'		Asg. Ali 14'; Ar. Ali 27', 69'

Aoti Hockey Field, Guangzhou
Umpires:
Simon Taylor (NZL)
Ilanggo Kanabathu (MAS)

18 November
19:30

Japan	2–8	Pakistan
Kitazato 3'; Tsubouchi 66'		F. Ahmed 4'; Abbas 20', 51'; Rizwan 29'; Waqas 55'; Imran 61'; Abbasi 64'; Zubair 70'

Aoti Hockey Field, Guangzhou
Umpires:
Chen Dekang (CHN)
Jang Jung-min (KOR)

20 November
13:00

Hong Kong	1–6	Japan
Ar. Ali 46'		Kitazato 18', 61', 70'; Mitani 33'; Sakamoto 44'; Yamabori 63'

Aoti Hockey Field, Guangzhou
Umpires:
John Hrytsak (CAN)
Jang Jung-min (KOR)

20 November
15:00

India	3–2	Pakistan
San. Singh 3', 48'; D. Singh 16'		Butt 4'; Abbasi 43'

Aoti Hockey Field, Guangzhou
Umpires:
Simon Taylor (NZL)
Adam Kearns (AUS)

21 November
14:30

Pakistan	6–1	Bangladesh
Abbasi 13', 27'; Abbas 15', 29'; Imran 37', 48'		Barmon 63'

Aoti Hockey Field, Guangzhou
Umpires:
Chen Dekang (CHN)
Ilanggo Kanabathu (MAS)

21 November
17:30

Japan	2–3	India
Sakamoto 21', 63'		R. Singh 31'; San. Singh 38', 62'

Aoti Hockey Field, Guangzhou
Umpires:
Kim Hong-lae (KOR)
Lim Hong Zhen (SGP)

=== Classification 9th–10th ===
25 November
9:00

Singapore	1–2 (a.e.t.)	Hong Kong
Marican 51'		Ar. Ali 35', 81'

Aoti Hockey Field, Guangzhou
Umpires:
Virender Singh (IND)
Ilanggo Kanabathu (MAS)

=== Classification 5th–8th ===
Classification 5th–8th
23 November
China	4
Bangladesh	1
23 November
Japan	13
Oman	1

Classification 5th–6th
25 November
China	2
Japan	0
Classification 7th–8th
25 November
Bangladesh	5
Oman	6

==== Semifinals ====
23 November
9:00

China	4–1	Bangladesh
Dong Yang 8'; Na Yubo 25'; Liu Yixian 26', 50'		Rana 41'

Aoti Hockey Field, Guangzhou
Umpires:
Haider Rasool (PAK)
Raghu Prasad (IND)

23 November
14:00

Japan	13–1	Oman
Yamabori 2', 3', 31', 42', 66', 69'; Kitazato 8', 23'; Nagasawa 18', 45'; Tsubouchi 20', 35'; Anai 62'		Rajab 36'

Aoti Hockey Field, Guangzhou
Umpires:
Jang Jung-min (KOR)
Lim Hong Zhen (SGP)

==== Classification 7th–8th ====
25 November
9:30

Bangladesh	5–6	Oman
Chayan 10', 43'; Mimo 20', 33'; Das 45'		Al-Shibli 2'; Rajab 22'; Al-Shatri 54'; Al-Saadi 56'; Bait Jandal 58'; H. Al-Hasani 69'

Aoti Hockey Field, Guangzhou
Umpires:
Jang Jung-min (KOR)
John Hrytsak (CAN)

==== Classification 5th–6th ====
25 November
12:00

China	2–0	Japan
Liu Yixian 19'; Na Yubo 65'

Aoti Hockey Field, Guangzhou
Umpires:
Simon Taylor (NZL)
Raghu Prasad (IND)

=== Final round ===
Semifinals
23 November
South Korea	1 (3)
Pakistan (p)	1 (4)
23 November
India	3
Malaysia (a.e.t.)	4

Gold medal game
25 November
Pakistan	2
Malaysia	0
Bronze medal game
25 November
South Korea	0
India	1

==== Semifinals ====
23 November
15:00

South Korea	1–1 (a.e.t.)	Pakistan
Kang Moon-kyu 39'		Waqas 22'
Penalties
Lee Nam-yong (penalty shoot-out missed); Nam Hyun-woo (penalty shoot-out scored); Hyun Hye-sung (penalty shoot-out missed); Yeo Woon-kon (penalty shoot-out scored); Jang Jong-hyun (penalty shoot-out scored) --- Jang Jong-hyun (penalty shoot-out missed); Yeo Woon-kon (penalty shoot-out missed)	3–4	(penalty shoot-out scored) Abbas; (penalty shoot-out missed) Irfan; (penalty shoot-out missed) Imran; (penalty shoot-out scored) Khan; (penalty shoot-out scored) Abbasi --- (penalty shoot-out missed) Abbas; (penalty shoot-out scored) Khan

Aoti Hockey Field, Guangzhou
Umpires:
Simon Taylor (NZL)
Chen Dekang (CHN)

23 November
17:30

India	3–4 (a.e.t.)	Malaysia
San. Singh 35'; Khandker 37'; R. Singh 54'		Tajuddin 32'; Misron 49'; A. Rahim 67', 75'

Aoti Hockey Field, Guangzhou
Umpires:
Kim Hong-lae (KOR)
Adam Kearns (AUS)

==== Bronze medal game ====
25 November
14:00

South Korea	0–1	India
		Khandker 40'

Aoti Hockey Field, Guangzhou
Umpires:
Haider Rasool (PAK)
Lim Hong Zhen (SGP)

==== Gold medal game ====
25 November
17:00

Pakistan	2–0	Malaysia
Abbas 26'; Butt 38'

Aoti Hockey Field, Guangzhou
Umpires:
Kim Hong-lae (KOR)
Adam Kearns (AUS)

== Final standing ==
Rank	Team	Pld	W	D	L
1st place, gold medalist(s)	Pakistan	6	4	1	1
2nd place, silver medalist(s)	Malaysia	6	4	1	1
3rd place, bronze medalist(s)	India	6	5	0	1
4	South Korea	6	3	2	1
5	China	6	4	0	2
6	Japan	6	3	0	3
7	Oman	6	2	0	4
8	Bangladesh	6	1	0	5
9	Hong Kong	5	1	0	4
10	Singapore	5	0	0	5
