= List of foreign Malaysia Hockey League players =

This is a list of foreign players in the Malaysia Hockey League, which commenced play in 2005. The following players must meet the following criteria of the rule by the Malaysia Hockey Federation. The player have played at least one League game. Players who were signed by Malaysia Hockey League clubs.

== List of foreign players ==
=== Hong Kong ===
- Akhbar Ali - RAMD HC - 2005
- Arif Ali - RAMD HC - 2005

=== India ===
- Prem Kumar - Nur Insafi - 2007
- Deepak Kumar - Nur Insafi - 2007
- Bikash Toppo - Nur Insafi - 2007
- Pacha Sunil Prasad - Nur Insafi HC - 2005
- Dhanraj Pillay - Telekom Malaysia HC - 2005
- Len Aiyappa - Telekom Malaysia HC - 2005
- Abdullah Sukri -2013

=== Ireland ===
- David Harte -UniKL - 2018

=== Singapore ===
- Muhammad Anuar Ali - Maybank HC- 2005
- Faizal Ani - RMN Dolphins HC- 2005
- Mohd Faizal Mohd Idoris - RMN Dolphins HC- 2005
- Abdul Hadi Adam - RMN Dolphins HC- 2005

=== Pakistan ===
- Syed Imran Ali Warsi - Bank Simpanan Nasional HC - 2003 & Nur Insafi HC - 2010
- Ali Raza - Ernst & Young HC - 2005
- Muhammad Sarwar - Ernst & Young HC - 2005
- Abdul Asim Khan - S.A.S Pahang HC - 2005
- Yasir Islam - S.A.S Pahang HC - 2005
- Sohail Abbas - Bank Simpanan Nasional HC - 2005
- Furqan Saleem - KL Hockey Club -2013-2014

=== South Korea ===
- Kang Keong-Wook - Sapura HC - 2005
- Hwang Jong-Hyun - Sapura HC - 2005

== See also ==
- Malaysia Hockey League
