= Malaysia Junior Hockey League =

- Sport: Field Hockey
- No. of teams: Division 1: 6 Division 2: 10
- Country: Malaysia
- Most titles: Bukit Jalil Sports School (7 titles)
- Broadcaster: Astro Arena

The Malaysia Junior Hockey League (MJHL) is a top junior league competition for junior field hockey clubs in the Malaysian hockey system. At present also it is sponsored by Milo and National Sports Council.

== Teams ==
A record 27 teams will feature in the 2014 Malaysian Junior Hockey League.

Division 1	Division 2	Women's
BJSS-Thunderbolt	Akademi Hoki Pahang	(Federal Territories of Malaysia) Kuala Lumpur Wipers
MBPJ	Anderson PHA	MSN Kedah
Nur Insafi	Anderson Thunderbolt	(Penang) Mutiara Impian
Olak PKT Tigers	BJSS Juniors	Sekolah Sukan Malaysia Sabah
Politeknik Malaysia	Felda Juniors	Selangor Girls
SMK Dato Bentara Luar	KHA Kedah Juniors	(Perak) SMK Gunung Rapat Highlander
SSP-MSP-Thunderbolt	Malacca High School-Hercules	(Terengganu) SMK Padang Midin
SSTMI Juniors	MATRI	(Kelantan) SMK Sultan Ibrahim 1
SSTMI-Thunderbolt	MCKK	(Johor) SMK Tun Hussein Onn
UniKL Young Guns	MISCF-UFL	(Negeri Sembilan) SMK Za'ba
	MSN/PHP Perlis Young Lion Juniors	Southern Girls
	MSNPK/ILHC	(Johor) SSTMI-Thunderbolt
	MSNT/PHT	(Federal Territories of Malaysia) UniKL Young Guns
	MSS Kedah	Yayasan Pahang-MSP
	MSSPs/PHP Perlis Young Lion Juniors	
	MSSWPKL	
	Penang MSSPP-USM	
	Sekolah Sukan Malaysia Sabah	
	Sekolah Tuanku Abdul Rahman	
	SM Sains Johor	
	SM Sains Raja Tun Azlan Shah	
	SMK Datuk Mohd Taha	
	SMKDBL Juniors	
	Tunku Besar Sports School	
	Young Hurricanes Malacca	

=== Former teams ===
- (Federal Territories of Malaysia) Sapura
- (Kedah) Polimas
- Penang Free School Junior
- Kedah HA-MSN Kedah
- (Federal Territories of Malaysia) SMK Tinggi Setapak
- (Perlis) SMK Datuk Syed Ahmad
- MSN-MSS Sabah
- MSS-Sarawak
- (Malacca) SMK St. Davids
- (Federal Territories of Malaysia) St. John's Institution
- (Selangor) MBPJ
- (Federal Territories of Malaysia) KLHC
- Tunas Muda Pahang
- 1MAS Penang

== History ==
=== Origin ===
The tournament was initiated to revive interest in the sport which was losing spectator interest to football in recent times. Hockey is one of Malaysia's major sports.

One of the main reasons for the waning popularity of the existing domestic competition was the rise of corporate teams such as Ernst & Young, TNB and Maybank which do not have a steady fan following. MHL is trying to change that by bringing in regional flavour. It fields teams from traditional hockey bastions such as Kuala Lumpur, Penang, other areas, as well as from other places where it has got some fan following.

The MHC-Milo-NSC Malaysia Junior Hockey League (MJHL) made its debut in 1995.

== Founding ==
The competition was first played in 2000 involving 11 teams. Initiated by Malaysian Hockey Federation (MHF) with active support from sports channel ESPN Malaysia. First season had two tiers division 1 and division 2 but from 2007 season onwards division 2 was scrapped. Except team winning 2006 division 2 championship rest all teams in division 2 were scrapped.

== Competition ==
=== Malaysian Women's Junior Hockey League ===
The inaugural women’s junior league, also an Under-19 event took off in 2016 season. It runs from February 19 to April 10. The league attracted the participation of 14 teams from nine states, with exception of teams from Perlis, Malacca and Sarawak.

SSTMI-Thunderbolt lifted the inaugural Women’s Junior Hockey League title with a slim 2-1 win over Kuala Lumpur Wipers in the final.

=== Girls' team ===
The league is specifically for boys’ Under-19 league, however few women's team has expressed interest to join the junior league. This includes Tunku Mahkota Ismail Sports School (SSTMI) girls’ team that have submitted their entry to play in the 2013 season.

In the 2011 season, the national women’s team featured in the MJHL as invitation team because there was lack of women’s domestic competitions. It was known as MWHA-SSBP in the MJHL that year. Matri, a team from Perlis refused to play against the MWHA-SSBP team on religious grounds and that resulted in Matri being thrown out of the league, fined RM500 and banned for a year.

== Players ==
A team shall consist of maximum of 18 (eighteen) players to be registered with MHF. Out of the above 18, maximum of 3 players can be of foreign origin. At any given point of time minimum 2 players of foreign origin shall be within the field of play during the course of a game. All 18 players in a team have to be registered with the MHF and need to submit their identity cards before the start of the league qualifying for playing in a team. All Malaysian players currently employed have to be taken on lien for the duration of the league and then be registered with MHF. All the foreign players must obtain International Transfer Certificates from their respective countries and or clubs before signing up with the team in MHL and MHF.

=== Import players ===
There are a number of players from countries other than Malaysia, who have been contracted to play in the league.

== Champions ==
=== League ===
The league champion is crowned by finishing top of the league table of two round robin matches.

Season	Division 1	Division 2
2017		SSMS Resilient
2016	(Johor) SSTMI-Thunderbolt	Perlis Young Lions Juniors
2013	(Johor) SSTMI-Thunderbolt	
2012	(Johor) SSTMI-Thunderbolt	(Federal Territories of Malaysia) Sapura
2011	(Federal Territories of Malaysia) UniKL	(Negeri Sembilan) Tunku Besar School
2010	(Johor) BPSS-Thunderbolt	Majlis Sukan Negeri Sabah
2009	(Federal Territories of Malaysia) Bukit Jalil Sports School	(Penang) Nur Insafi Juniors
2008	(Federal Territories of Malaysia) Bukit Jalil Sports School	
2007	(Federal Territories of Malaysia) Bukit Jalil Sports School	
2006	(Federal Territories of Malaysia) Bukit Jalil Sports School	
2005	(Federal Territories of Malaysia) Bukit Jalil Sports School	
2004	(Federal Territories of Malaysia) Bukit Jalil Sports School	
2003	(Federal Territories of Malaysia) Bukit Jalil Sports School	
2002	(Federal Territories of Malaysia) TNB	(Pahang) Telekom Malaysia
2001	(Federal Territories of Malaysia) TNB	
2000	(Federal Territories of Malaysia) TNB	
1999	(Selangor) OLAK Klang HC	
1998	(Selangor) OLAK Klang HC	
1997	(Selangor) OLAK Klang HC	
1996	(Penang) Electrical Switchgear Automation	
1995	Yayasan Negeri Sembilan	

=== Cup ===
The overall cup is also known as MILO-MJHL Cup due to sponsorship reason.

Season	Overall Champions
2013	(Johor) SSTMI-Thunderbolt
2012	(Johor) SSTMI
2011	(Johor) BPSS-Thunderbolts
2010	(Federal Territories of Malaysia) UniKL
2009	(Federal Territories of Malaysia) BJSS
2008	(Federal Territories of Malaysia) BJSS
2007	(Federal Territories of Malaysia) BJSS
2006	(Selangor) MBPJ
2005	(Federal Territories of Malaysia) BJSS
2004	(Federal Territories of Malaysia) BJSS
2003	(Federal Territories of Malaysia) TNB
2002	(Pahang) Telekom Malaysia
2001	Malacca City Council
2000	(Selangor) OLAK Klang HC
1999	(Selangor) OLAK Klang HC
1998	(Selangor) OLAK Klang HC
1997	(Penang) Electrical Switchgear Automation
1996	(Penang) Electrical Switchgear Automation
1995	Yayasan Negeri Sembilan

== See also ==
- Malaysian Hockey Federation
- Malaysia men's national field hockey team
- Malaysia women's national field hockey team
- Malaysia Hockey League
