= Valentin Verga =

Argentine-born Dutch field hockey player

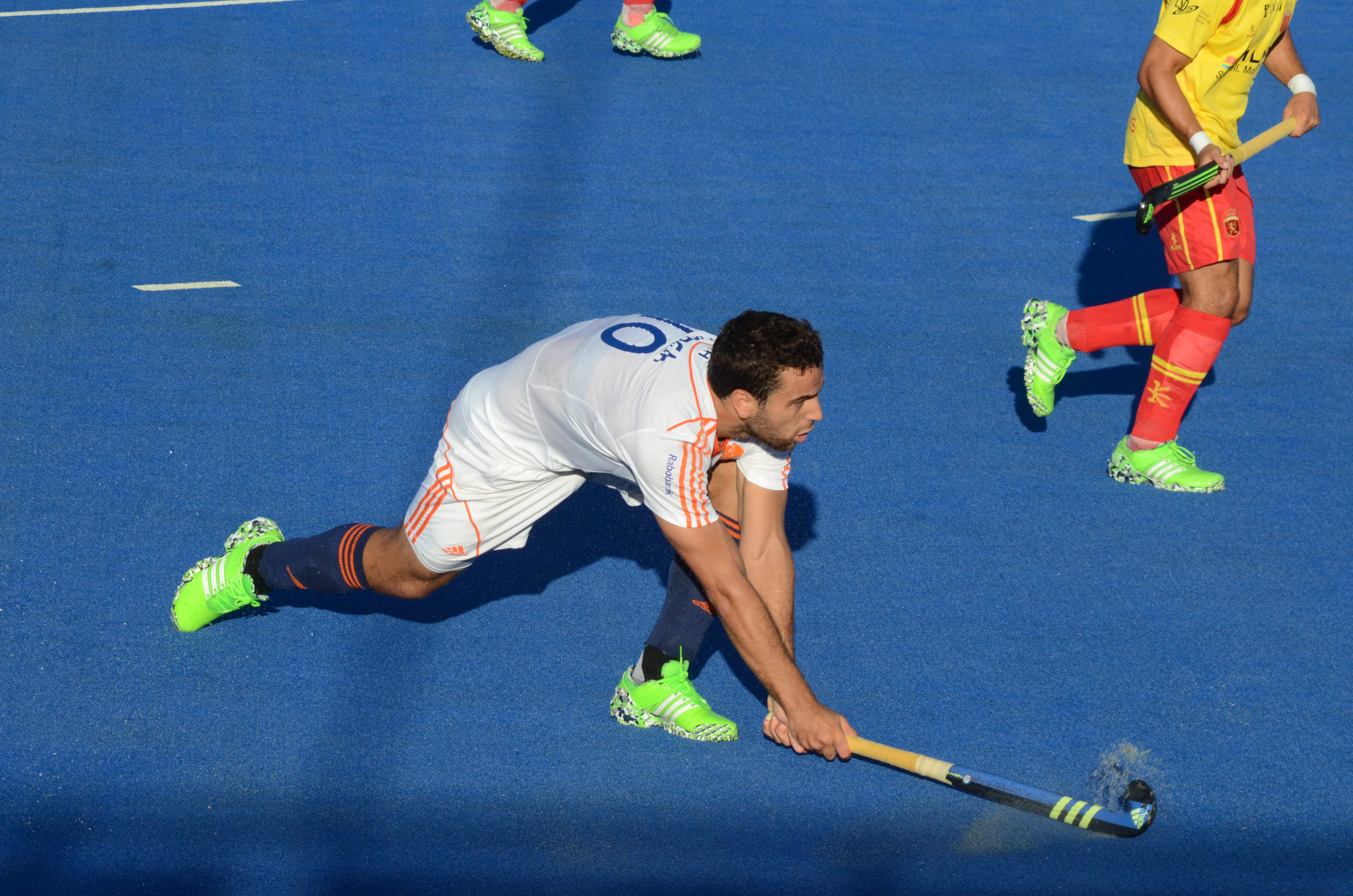
- Verga in 2015

Personal information
- Born: 7 October 1989 (age 36) Buenos Aires, Argentina

Sport
- Sport: Field hockey
- Position: Midfielder / Forward
- Club: Amsterdam
Youth career
- Years: Team
- –2000: GEBA
- 2000–2007: Almere
Senior career
Years	Team	Caps	Goals
2007–2024	Amsterdam	-	-
2017	→ Terengganu	-	-
2019	→ UniKL	-	-
2024–present	Almere	-	-
National team
Years	Team	Caps	Goals
2009–2020	Netherlands	193	(35)
Medal record
Men's field hockey
Representing the Netherlands
Olympic Games
Silver medal – second place	2012 London	Team
World Cup
Silver medal – second place	2014 The Hague
Silver medal – second place	2018 Bhubaneswar
Bronze medal – third place	2010 New Delhi
EuroHockey Championship
Gold medal – first place	2015 London
Gold medal – first place	2017 Amstelveen
Silver medal – second place	2011 Mönchengladbach
Bronze medal – third place	2013 Boom
Champions Trophy
Silver medal – second place	2012 Melbourne
Bronze medal – third place	2010 Mönchengladbach
Bronze medal – third place	2011 Auckland
Bronze medal – third place	2018 Breda

Valentin Verga (born 7 October 1989) is an Argentine-born Dutch field hockey player who plays as a midfielder or forward for Almere.

== Club career ==
Verga has played his whole senior career for Amsterdam. In the Dutch winter break in 2017, he was the first Dutch player to play in the Malaysia Hockey League, he played for Terengganu. In the winter of 2019, he returned to Malaysia, this time he played for UniKL. After 17 years in Amsterdam he returned to Almere in 2024 where he played until he was 18 years old.

== International career ==
At the 2012 Summer Olympics, he competed for the national team in the men's tournament, winning a silver medal. He was also part of the Netherlands 2016 Summer Olympic team. His father Alejandro was also an Olympic hockey player, but for Argentina. In 2018, Verga played in his third World Cup, where they won the silver medal. Due to his decision to play in the 2019 Malaysia Hockey League, he was not selected for the 2019 FIH Pro League. After the 2019 European Championships he returned in the national team for the FIH Olympic Qualifier against Pakistan. In February 2020 he was dropped from the national team's training squad for the 2020 Summer Olympics.
