= Mirnawan Nawawi =

Malaysian hockey player

Personal information
- Full name: Mirnawan Bin Nawawi
- Born: 19 September 1971 (age 54) Malacca, Malaysia
- Height: 1.7 m (5 ft 7 in)

Sport
- Sport: Field hockey
- Position: Forward
Senior career
Years	Team	Caps	Goals
1988	Malaysia Jr.	-	-
–	Bank Simpanan Nasional HC	-	-
1991-1992	Kelab Kilat	-	-
1996	Yayasan Negeri Sembilan HC	-	-
1997	MPPJ HC	-	-
1998–2001	Bank Simpanan Nasional HC	-	-
2002	Arthur Andersen SC	-	-
2003	Ernst & Young	-	-
2004	Sapura HC	-	-
2005	Telekom Malaysia HC	-	-
National team
Years	Team	Caps	Goals
1989–2002	Malaysia	327	-
Medal record
Men's field hockey
Representing Malaysia
Asian Games
Bronze medal – third place	1990 Beijing	Team
Commonwealth Games
Silver medal – second place	1998 Kuala Lumpur	Team
Southeast Asian Games
Gold medal – first place	2001 Kuala Lumpur	Team
Gold medal – first place	1999 Bandar Seri Bengawan	Team
Gold medal – first place	1997 Jakarta	Team
Gold medal – first place	1995 Chiang Mai	Team

Mirnawan Nawawi (born 19 September 1971) is a former field hockey player from Malacca, Malaysia. He went to the Royal Military College, Kuala Lumpur during his high school years. Mirnawan was the skipper for the Malaysia national team from 1998 until 2002. He was known as 'The Boss' during his playing days and has scored 250 career goals.

== Career ==
=== Domestic ===
In Malaysia Hockey League, Mirnawan has won four doubles with four teams Tenaga Nasional Berhad HC (then called Kelab Kilat) in 1991–92, Yayasan Negeri Sembilan HC in 1996, MPPJ in 1997 and BSN in 2000. In 2001 he won the MHL Cup and emerged as the top scorer with 19 goals but lost the league title to Tenaga Nasional Berhad.

In 2002, he represented the Arthur Andersen Sports Club. In 2004, he clinched the league title with Sapura. He last played in the Malaysian Hockey League for Telekom Malaysia in 2005. He returned to the competitive game when playing for Kepong Baru in the Kuala Lumpur Hockey League.

=== National team ===
In 1988, 17-year-old Mirnawan was part of a Junior World Cup bound team that played in the MHL.

Mirnawan has played in three Olympics Barcelona 1992, Atlanta 1996 and Sydney 2000, three Asian Games Beijing 1990, Hiroshima 1994 and Bangkok 1998, the Champions Trophy and two World Cup in Utrecht 1998 and Kuala Lumpur 2012.

In his last Olympic appearances, Mirnawan was selected as the Flag Bearer of the Malaysian Contingent for the Opening Ceremony of the Sydney 2000 Olympic Games. He stepped down from the international scene in 2002 after having acquired 327 caps.

He is the manager for Project 2013 squad that finish as champions in 2012 Junior Asia Cup.

Olympic Games
Preceded by Nor Saiful Zaini Nasir-ud-Din	Flagbearer for Malaysia; Sydney 2000	Succeeded by Bryan Nickson Lomas
