= 2013 Malaysia Junior Hockey League =

Tournament details
- Dates: 11 January – 3 March
- Administrator(s): Malaysian Hockey Confederation
- Format(s): Double Round-robin and Knock-out
- Host(s): Malaysia
- Venue(s): 8
- Teams: 28

The 2013 Malaysia Junior Hockey League is slated to begin on 11 January 2013. SSTMI-Thunderbolt is the defending champion for both league and cup.

Before the seasons gets underway, controversial issue involving SSTMI girls' team that submitted an entry to the Under-19 boys league. However the competitions committee met and were against the idea and decided to create a junior girls' league this year.

== Teams ==
A total of 28 teams enter this season, the highest since 1995.

=== Division 1 ===
The eight teams playing in Division One are as below:

- BJSS
- Malacca High School
- UniKL
- MBPJ
- SSTMI Thunderbolt
- SSTMI Juniors
- MBI-Anderson School
- MSSPP-USM

=== Division 2 ===
Division Two will have two groups of ten teams each. For Group A the teams comprise mostly from the northern region to cut down the cost of travel.

Group A

- Sabah Juniors ‡
- MSS Perlis
- Nur Insafi
- Anderson Juniors
- PHK-MSS Kelantan
- Matri
- KHA Juniors
- SMK Tunku Abdul Rahman
- 1MAS Penang
- SM Sains Tun Azlan Shah

Group B

- Tunas Muda Pahang
- SMK Padang Midin
- MSN Johor
- Politeknik KPT
- KL Sports School
- BJSS Juniors
- Kuala Langat
- SMK Datuk Mohd Taha
- Tunku Besar School
- OLAK-Klang PKT

‡ withdrawn

== Results ==
10 January 2013
17:00

SSTMI Thunderbolt	6–0	SSTMI Juniors

11 January 2013
17:00

BJSS	0–1	SSTMI Thunderbolt

11 January 2013
17:00

SSTMI Juniors	2–3	MBPJ

Home \ Away	Anderson	BJSS	MBPJ	MHS	SSTMI	SSTMI Juniors	UniKL	USM
Anderson								2–0
BJSS			0–1		0–1			
MBPJ								
MHS	3–3							
SSTMI				9–0		6–0		
SSTMI Juniors			2–3				2–6	
UniKL		6–1						
USM								
