= 2010 Malaysia Junior Hockey League =

Tournament details
- Dates: April 9 – May 30
- Administrator(s): Malaysian Hockey Confederation
- Format(s): Single Round-robin and Knock-out
- Host(s): Malaysia
- Venue(s): 10
- Teams: 18

Final positions
- Champions: (Johor) BPSS Thunderbolt (1st title)
- Runner-up: (Federal Territories of Malaysia) UniKL
- Third Place: (Federal Territories of Malaysia) BJSS

Tournament summary
- Player of the tournament: Mohd Firhan Ashaari
- Most goals: Faizal Saari (BPSS-Thunderbolt, 16 goals)

The 2010 Malaysia Junior Hockey League (field hockey) begins on April 9, 2010. BJSS is the defending champion for both league and cup.

== Teams ==
A total of 17 boys teams entered this season, a girls' team Malaysia women's national field hockey team is entered into the Division 1 and named as Malaysia Women Hockey Association.

=== Division 1 ===
- (Federal Territories of Malaysia) BJSS
- (Federal Territories of Malaysia) BJSS Juniors
- PHK-MSS Kelantan
- Malaysia Women's Hockey Association
- (Federal Territories of Malaysia) UniKL
- (Selangor) MBPJ
- (Johor) BPSS Thunderbolt
- (Johor) BPSS Juniors
- (Perak) MBI-Anderson School

== Venues ==
- Alor Setar: Alor Setar Hockey Stadium
- Klang: Pandamaran Hockey Stadium
- Kuala Terengganu: Kuala Terengganu Hockey Stadium
- Lembah Pantai: Kuala Lumpur Hockey Stadium, Kuala Lumpur
- Ipoh: Sultan Azlan Shah Hockey Stadium
- Seremban: Seremban Two Hockey Stadium
- Bandar Penawar: Bandar Penawar Sports School
- Jalan Duta: Tun Razak Hockey Stadium, Kuala Lumpur
- Tampin: Tampin Stadium
- Universiti Sains Malaysia: USM Stadium, Penang

== Results ==
=== Division 1 ===
Pos	Team	Pld	W	D	L	GF	GA	GD	Pts
1	(Johor) BPSS Thunderbolt	8	7	1	0	37	6	+31	22
2	(Federal Territories of Malaysia) UniKL-TRC	8	6	2	0	33	8	+25	20
3	(Federal Territories of Malaysia) BJSS	8	5	2	1	24	7	+17	17
4	(Selangor) MBPJ	8	4	1	3	19	15	+4	13
5	(Johor) BPSS Juniors	8	3	1	4	12	16	−4	10
6	(Perak) MBI-Anderson School	8	3	1	4	14	28	−14	10
7	PHK-MSS Kelantan	8	1	3	4	11	34	−23	6
8	(Federal Territories of Malaysia) BJSS Juniors	8	1	1	6	5	25	−20	4
9	Malaysia Women Hockey Association	8	0	0	8	8	25	−17	0

=== First to eighth place classification ===
Quarter-finals
1	(Johor) BPSS-Thunderbolt	9
8	(Perak) Ipoh City Council	1
4	(Selangor) MBPJ	3
5	(Johor) BPSS Juniors	2
2	(Federal Territories of Malaysia) UniKL HC	4
7	(Pahang) MSSP–MPK	2
3	MSN Sabah	0
6	(Federal Territories of Malaysia) BJSS	4

Semi-finals
(Johor) BPSS-Thunderbolt	5
(Selangor) MBPJ	3
(Federal Territories of Malaysia) UniKL HC	2
(Federal Territories of Malaysia) BJSS	1

Final
(Johor) BPSS-Thunderbolt	1
(Federal Territories of Malaysia) UniKL HC	2
Third place
(Selangor) MBPJ	1
(Federal Territories of Malaysia) BJSS	5

== Awards ==
Top Goalscorer	Player of the Tournament	Goalkeeper of the Tournament	Best Player of the Final	Fair Play Trophy
Faizal Saari ( (Johor) BPSS-Thunderbolt)	Mohd Firhan Ashaari ( (Johor) BPSS-Thunderbolt)	Mohd Hazrul Faiz ( (Federal Territories of Malaysia) BJSS)	Mohd Aminuddin Abu ( (Federal Territories of Malaysia) UniKL HC)	PHK-MSS Kelantan
