= Baljit Singh (field hockey, born 1987) =

Malaysian field hockey player (born 1987)

Personal information
- Full name: Baljit Singh s/o Sarjab Singh
- Born: 15 January 1987 (age 39) Johor, Malaysia

Sport
- Sport: Field hockey
- Position: Defender
Senior career
Years	Team	Caps	Goals
2006–	Ernst & Young / Kuala Lumpur HC	-	-
2011	Singh Sabha Sports Club A	?	3
National team
Years	Team	Caps	Goals
2006–	Malaysia	53	-
Medal record
Men's Hockey Asia Cup
Bronze medal – third place	2007 Chennai	Team
Asian Champions Trophy
Bronze medal – third place	2011 Ordos City

Baljit Singh s/o Sarjab Singh (Punjabi: ਬਲਜੀਤ ਸਿੰਘ, romanized: Balajīta sigha; born 15 January 1987) is a field hockey player from Kluang, Johor, Malaysia. Baljit is the 2008 top scorer in the Malaysia Hockey League with 13 goals.

He has also been the top scorer in the Malaysian Junior Hockey League for Bukit Jalil Sports School (BJSS) in 2004 with 13 goals, 2005 with 28 goals and 2006 with 23 goals. He featured in the 2007 Asia Cup in Chennai in August and scored three penalty corner goals.

In 2011, Baljit had a stint with Singh Sabha Sports Club in Hong Kong. He scored 3 goals in Hong Kong Premier Division.
