= Faizal Saari =

Malaysian field hockey player

Personal information
- Full name: Faizal bin Saari
- Born: 13 January 1991 (age 35) Kuala Terengganu, Terengganu, Malaysia

Sport
- Sport: Field hockey
- Position: Forward
Senior career
Years	Team	Caps	Goals
2009–2011	Tenaga Nasional Berhad	-	-
2011–	Southern Hotshots	5	3
2011–	Forestville	3	7
2012–	Tenaga Nasional Berhad	?	20
2012–2013	Mumbai Magicians	12	0
2013–	Terengganu	-	-
National team
Years	Team	Caps	Goals
2009–	Malaysia	302	(176)
Medal record
Men's field hockey
Representing Malaysia
Asian Games
Silver medal – second place	2010 Guangzhou	Team
Silver medal – second place	2018 Jakarta-Palembang	Team
Asia Cup
Silver medal – second place	2017 Dhaka
Silver medal – second place	2022 Jakarta
Asian Champions Trophy
Silver medal – second place	2023 Chennai
Bronze medal – third place	2011 Ordos
Bronze medal – third place	2012 Doha
Bronze medal – third place	2013 Kakamigahara
Bronze medal – third place	2016 Malaysia
Bronze medal – third place	2018 Muscat
Southeast Asian Games
Gold medal – first place	2017 Kuala Lumpur	Team

Faizal bin Saari (born 13 January 1991) is a Malaysian field hockey player. He currently plays as a striker for Terengganu Hockey Team.

== Career ==
=== Club ===
Faizal started his Malaysia Hockey League career with Terengganu Hockey Team. He was the 2011 league top goalscorer with 19 goals.

In June 2011, Faizal started his overseas career along with another Malaysian Sukri Mutalib. They were selected by the Southern Hotshots team for the Australian Hockey League. He represented Southern Hotshots in the ten matches league. He scored three goals in five matches for Southern Hotshots. He also played in the Adelaide League and made seven strikes for Forestville Hockey Club in three appearances.

In 2012, he returned to Tenaga Nasional Berhad Hockey Club and earned the top goalscorer award with 20 goals. While playing for Tenaga Nasional Berhad, he received an offer to play in the Spanish Division One for Atlètic Terrassa Hockey Club.

After the 2012 season ended, Faizal was bought over by Mumbai Magicians for US$26,000 (MYR79,560) in an auction to feature in the Hockey India League. He is the highest paid hockey player in Malaysia, followed by Kumar Subramaniam who featured for Uttar Pradesh Wizards after being bought over for US$15,000 (MYR45,900). However he had a miserable outing in the HIL firing blanks in all 12 matches.

=== International ===
Faizal made his national senior team debut in the Champions Challenge II in Dublin in 2009 aged 18. He was the members of the Malaysian squad that won the silver medal in the 2010 Asian Games. He also part of Malaysia youth team that won the 2012 Asian Hockey Youth Cup. He scored one of the two goals in the final against Pakistan.

Faizal was the leading goal scorer at the 2018 Asian Men's Hockey Champions Trophy where he finished with 8 goals. Malaysia finished at the 3rd place after defeating Japan 3–2 in the penalty shootouts in the bronze medal match.
