= Imran Butt =

Imran Butt can refer to:

- Imran Butt (cricketer) (born 1995), Pakistani cricketer
- Imran Butt (field hockey) (born 1988), Pakistani field hockey player
