= Ismail Abu =

Malaysian field hockey player (born 1984)

Personal information
- Full name: Ismail Bin Abu
- Born: 8 April 1984 (age 42) Pahang, Malaysia

Sport
- Sport: Field hockey
- Position: Forward
Senior career
Years	Team	Caps	Goals
2000–2001	Arthur Andersen	-	-
2001–2012	Ernst & Young HC / KL HC	-	-
2013–	Terengganu Hockey Team	-	-
National team
Years	Team	Caps	Goals
2002–	Malaysia	162+	-
Medal record
Men's field hockey
Representing Malaysia
Commonwealth Games
Bronze medal – third place	2006 Melbourne	Team
Asian Champions Trophy
Bronze medal – third place	2013 Kakamigahara

Ismail Bin Abu (born 8 April 1984) is a Malaysian field hockey player. He was the forward of Malaysia hockey team and Terengganu Hockey Team player in Malaysia.

He made his international debut in a four-nation tournament in Australia in 2002 and last donned national colours in the Champions Challenge II tournament in Dublin for indiscipline.

Under Paul Revington, he was called back into action after being axed previously.
