= Oh Dae-keun =

South Korean field hockey player (born 1982)

- Hangul: 오대근
- RR: O Daegeun
- MR: O Taegŭn

Oh Dae-keun
Medal record

Men's field hockey

Representing South Korea

Asian Games
| Bronze medal – third place | 2014 Incheon | Team |

Asia Cup
| Silver medal – second place | 2007 Chennai | |

Oh Dae-keun (born May 11, 1982) is a South Korean field hockey player. At the 2012 Summer Olympics, he competed for the national team in the men's tournament.
