= Rehan Butt =

Pakistani field hockey player

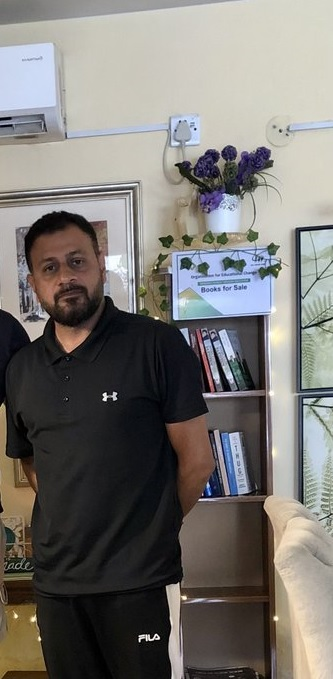
- Rehan in 2022

Personal information
- Born: 6 July 1980 (age 46) Lahore, Pakistan
- Height: 1.78 m (5ft 10in)

Sport
- Sport: Field hockey
- Position: Forward
Senior career
Years	Team	Caps	Goals
2001-2012	WAPDA	-	-
2006	Bangalore Lions	16	7
2008-2009	Laren HC	22	10
2010-2011	Sapura HC	21	12
2012	Chandigarh Comets	13	3
National team
Years	Team	Caps	Goals
2002-2012	Pakistan	274	(109)

Rehan Butt (Punjabi: ریحان بٹ) is a former Pakistani professional field hockey player who played as a forward for the Pakistan national field hockey team and also captained the team. A player known for his play-making skills and shooting in-front of the goal, Rehan was named in the FIH All Stars Team in 2008 and 2010. In 2008 he was declared as the Best Asian Player by the Asian Hockey Federation. At international level, Rehan represented Pakistan at three Olympics and two Hockey World Cups. He was part of the teams that finished third at three consecutive Champions Trophy in 2002, 2003 and 2004. He was part of the Pakistan team that won the gold medal at the 2010 Asian Games, becoming Asian Champions after a two-decade gap.

== Early life ==
Rehan was born in Lahore, Punjab, Pakistan (6 July 1980) as the second child of an ethnic Kashmiri family. His father Saqib Butt was a film producer by profession. Rehan's elder brother Rizwan also played hockey and they both used to go to the Noble Hockey Ground to play while Rehan was in fifth grade. There Rehan was spotted by the sports teacher of Govt. Model Town High School, Lahore while playing on artificial turf and offered to play for the school. Rehan and Rizwan helped the school win an inter-school trophy after seven years.

After completing his matriculation from the school, Rehan got admission in the Government College University, Lahore based on sports scholarship. In his first year, he helped the college reach the final of inter-college tournament where they lost the final to M.A.O. Graduate College who were 22 times champions. Rehan asked his teacher to allow him to select the team for the following year and promised him to win the trophy, his teacher agreed. The following year, Rehan was in-charge of team selection and for the position of goalkeeper he picked a tall young lad, Salman Akbar, who went on to play for Pakistan.

== International career ==
=== Junior team ===
Rehan was picked for the Pakistan junior team in 2001 for the tour of Germany. Rehan showed impressive performance with the junior squad and scored seven goals on the tour. Rehan was picked for the senior national team camp the following year under head coach Tahir Zaman but was not played for quite a while.

=== Debut and early years (2002-03) ===
After impressive performances with the junior squad he was selected for the tour of Europe in 2002 where he made his debut in the series against Spain. He scored in the opening match of the series in a 1–1 draw. He scored three goals in the four-match series, which Pakistan won 3–0. Despite impressive performance he was not part of the next campaign of the tour in England at the Commonwealth Games in Manchester. He was back in the squad for the 2002 Champions Trophy in Germany where he was substituted in the last eight minutes of the third-position game against India, Pakistan were trailing by 3–2 but Rehan scored two goals in quick succession to win the match for Pakistan. This match earned attention for Rehan back at home where he was interviewed by leading sports newspaper.

Butt appeared in all the tournaments for Pakistan in 2003. The team won the Azlan Shah Cup in March, finished third at the Champions Trophy in Amstelveen and were runners-up at the 2003 Hockey Asia Cup in Kuala Lumpur. During this period, Butt and Shakeel Abbasi built a young strong combination of forward line-up. As the team management rested senior players for future events, Butt and Abbasi became the key forwards for the team.

=== Olympics and later year (2004-05) ===
He was part of the squad for the pre-Olympic tours in Europe where he appeared in different tournaments in England, Spain and in a series against Germany. At the 2004 Olympics, he appeared in all games and scored four goals as Pakistan finished 5th at the event.

He played in the test series against India later on and in the Champions Trophy at home in Lahore at the end of the year.

Pakistan toured Europe in 2005 where they won the 2005 HockeyRabo Trophy after defeating Olympic Champions Australia in the final. Butt scored the equalizing goal as Pakistan won 4–3. This was Pakistan's first high-profile tournament win since their World Cup win in 1994.

=== 2006 Hockey World Cup and Asian Games ===
Pakistan started the year with the bilateral test series against India. Butt had made a reputation of a prolific striker against the traditional rivals India by now. He played in all of the tournaments in lead up to the World Cup in Germany in September. He scored a hat-trick at the Commonwealth Games in Melbourne, Pakistan finished runner-ups after they lost the final to Australia.

He scored three goals at the 2006 World Cup but Pakistan had a disappointing finish of sixth place. The team finished with a bronze medal at the Asian Games later in the year.

=== Captaincy and Olympics (2007-08) ===
Butt was named the national team captain for the first time for the 2007 Sultan Azlan Shah Cup. He retained captaincy for the tournaments in Europe and China in preparation for the Olympics the following year. In 2008, Butt was the top scorer at Azlan Shah Cup with six goals. In a dismal Olympics campaign for Pakistan in Beijing, he only managed to score one goal.

=== Later years (2009-12) ===
He maintained good individual performances despite Pakistan showing mixed results from disastrous campaigns at the 2010 Hockey World Cup and Azlan Shah Cup. He was part of the Pakistan team that won became champions at the Asian Games for the first time after 20 years. Butt scored a goal in the 2–0 victory against Malaysia in the final. Butt was named in the All Star Team for the second time in 2010.

From 2011 he was largely out of the team due to injuries and disciplinary issues. After the tour from Europe in July 2011 he was dropped from the team for the remainder of the season because of behavioral issues but Butt denied these claims. Despite the team's poor results and calls for his inclusion he was not picked for the team.

In 2012 he was recalled to the squad along with other senior players for the European tour before the 2012 Olympics. He scored the opening goal against Spain in the 1–1 draw at the first match of the Olympics.

Though he didn't announce his retirement he was not considered for any future event. He later took up role as a player-coach after his playing days.

== Club career ==
He started his domestic career playing for WAPDA in Pakistan's National Hockey Championship. He played for Bangalore Lions in Premier Hockey League in 2006 where he was pivotal in their title winning campaign. In 2008/09 he signed for Laren HC in the Netherlands. Afterwards in 2010 he played in the Malaysia Hockey League for Sapura. In 2012 he played in the unsanctioned World Series Hockey for Chandigarh Comets.

== Management roles ==
Butt along with his former teammate Muhammad Saqlain became part of the Pakistan team's management from 2016 under Roelant Oltmans. He was assistant coach at the 2018 Hockey World Cup for team Pakistan. He also managed Pakistan development squad for the tour of Oman in 2019.

== International career statistics ==
Appearances and goals for the national team

As of August 2012

Year	Apps	Goals
2002	14	6
2003	33	9
2004	50	15
2005	20	13
2006	44	18
2007	19	7
2008	26	14
2009	15	9
2010	24	15
2011	19	2
2012	10	1
Total	274	109

List of international goals scored by Rehan Butt

No	Date	Opponent	Result	Venue	Competition
1	14 July 2002	Spain	1–1	Gijon, Spain	Test match
2	20 July 2002	Spain	3–5	Madrid, Spain	Test match
3	20 July 2002	Spain	3–5	Madrid, Spain	Test match
4	8 September 2002	India	3–4	Cologne, Germany	2002 Hockey Champions Trophy
5	8 September 2002	India	3–4	Cologne, Germany	2002 Hockey Champions Trophy
6	4 October 2002	Bangladesh	0–9	Busan, South Korea	2002 Asian Games
7	22 March 2003	New Zealand	6–1	Ipoh, Malaysia	2003 Sultan Azlan Shah Cup
8	23 March 2003	Germany	4–3	Ipoh, Malaysia	2003 Sultan Azlan Shah Cup
9	16 July 2003	China	7–0	Karachi, Pakistan	Test match
10	17 August 2003	Argentina	5–6	Amstelveen, Netherlands	2003 Hockey Champions Trophy
11	21 August 2003	Germany	5–2	Amstelveen, Netherlands	2003 Hockey Champions Trophy
12	22 August 2003	India	7–4	Amstelveen, Netherlands	2003 Hockey Champions Trophy
13	24 August 2003	India	4–3	Amstelveen, Netherlands	2003 Hockey Champions Trophy
14	21 September 2003	Bangladesh	8–0	Kuala Lumpur, Malaysia	2003 Hockey Asia Cup
15	25 October 2003	Egypt	3–1	Hyderabad, India	2003 Afro-Asian Games
16	8 January 2004	South Korea	2–4	Kuala Lumpur, Malaysia	2004 Sultan Azlan Shah Cup
17	8 January 2004	South Korea	2–4	Kuala Lumpur, Malaysia	2004 Sultan Azlan Shah Cup
18	6 March 2004	India	5–3	Madrid, Spain	2004 Olympics Qualifier
19	19 June 2004	Argentina	6–3	Hamburg, Germany	2004 Hamburg Masters
20	3 July 2004	India	5–3	Amstelveen, Netherlands	2004 Hockey RaboTrophy
21	3 July 2004	India	5–3	Amstelveen, Netherlands	2004 Hockey RaboTrophy
22	31 July 2004	Argentina	2–2	Alcalá la Real, Spain	Three Nations Alcalá la Real
23	15 August 2004	Germany	2–1	Athens, Greece	2004 Summer Olympics
24	19 August 2004	South Korea	3–0	Athens, Greece	2004 Summer Olympics
25	23 August 2004	Great Britain	8–3	Athens, Greece	2004 Summer Olympics
26	23 August 2004	Great Britain	8–3	Athens, Greece	2004 Summer Olympics
27	24 September 2004	India	2–1	Karachi, Pakistan	Test match
28	1 October 2004	India	4–4	Lahore, Pakistan	Test match
29	8 October 2004	India	1–2	Amritsar, India	Test match
30	12 December 2004	India	3–2	Lahore, Pakistan	2004 Hockey Champions Trophy
31	29 May 2005	South Africa	2–0	Kuala Lumpur, Malaysia	2005 Sultan Azlan Shah Cup
32	1 June 2005	India	2–3	Kuala Lumpur, Malaysia	2005 Sultan Azlan Shah Cup
33	5 June 2005	New Zealand	4–2	Kuala Lumpur, Malaysia	2005 Sultan Azlan Shah Cup
34	5 June 2005	New Zealand	4–2	Kuala Lumpur, Malaysia	2005 Sultan Azlan Shah Cup
35	13 August 2005	Netherlands	6–5	Hamburg, Germany	2005 Hamburg Masters
36	13 August 2005	Netherlands	6–5	Hamburg, Germany	2005 Hamburg Masters
37	13 August 2005	Netherlands	6–5	Hamburg, Germany	2005 Hamburg Masters
38	19 August 2005	Germany	0–5	Amstelveen, Netherlands	2005 Hockey RaboTrophy
39	19 August 2005	Germany	0–5	Amstelveen, Netherlands	2005 Hockey RaboTrophy
40	21 August 2005	Australia	4–3	Amstelveen, Netherlands	2005 Hockey RaboTrophy
41	13 December 2005	Germany	4–4	Chennai, India	2005 Hockey Champions Trophy
42	16 December 2005	Australia	3–3	Chennai, India	2005 Hockey Champions Trophy
43	18 December 2005	India	3–4	Chennai, India	2005 Hockey Champions Trophy
44	15 February 2006	India	1–2	Chandigarh, India	Test match
45	15 February 2006	India	1–2	Chandigarh, India	Test match
46	21 March 2006	Trinidad and Tobago	1–7	Melbourne, Australia	2006 Commonwealth Games
47	21 March 2006	Trinidad and Tobago	1–7	Melbourne, Australia	2006 Commonwealth Games
48	21 March 2006	Trinidad and Tobago	1–7	Melbourne, Australia	2006 Commonwealth Games
49	22 March 2006	Malaysia	6–5	Melbourne, Australia	2006 Commonwealth Games
50	22 March 2006	Malaysia	6–5	Melbourne, Australia	2006 Commonwealth Games
51	17 April 2006	England	2–3	Changzhou, China	2006 Intercontinental Cup
52	19 April 2006	Ireland	2–2	Changzhou, China	2006 Intercontinental Cup
53	19 June 2006	Netherlands	2–3	Kuala Lumpur, Malaysia	2006 Sultan Azlan Shah Cup
54	29 July 2006	Argentina	2–1	Terrassa, Spain	2006 Hockey Champions Trophy
55	30 July 2006	Argentina	3–1	Terrassa, Spain	2006 Hockey Champions Trophy
56	30 July 2006	Argentina	3–1	Terrassa, Spain	2006 Hockey Champions Trophy
57	26 August 2006	Netherlands	6–4	Hamburg, Germany	2006 Hamburg Masters
58	7 September 2006	Japan	4–0	Mönchengladbach, Germany	2006 FIH Hockey World Cup
59	8 September 2006	New Zealand	4–4	Mönchengladbach, Germany	2006 FIH Hockey World Cup
60	10 September 2006	Spain	2–2	Mönchengladbach, Germany	2006 FIH Hockey World Cup
61	12 December 2006	China	1–2	Doha, Qatar	2006 Asian Games
62	12 May 2007	Argentina	4–2	Ipoh, Malaysia	2007 Sultan Azlan Shah Cup
63	7 July 2007	Ukraine	5–0	Moscow, Russia	Four Nations Moscow
64	8 July 2007	Scotland	4–0	Moscow, Russia	Four Nations Moscow
65	13 August 2007	Malaysia	4–1	Beijing, China	Good Luck Beijing Hockey
66	3 September 2007	Singapore	8–0	Chennai, India	2007 Hockey Asia Cup
67	3 September 2007	Singapore	8–0	Chennai, India	2007 Hockey Asia Cup
68	9 September 2007	China	2–3	Chennai, India	2007 Hockey Asia Cup
69	19 March 2008	China	0–5	Changzhou, China	Test match
70	9 May 2008	New Zealand	6–3	Ipoh, Malaysia	2008 Sultan Azlan Shah Cup
71	9 May 2008	New Zealand	6–3	Ipoh, Malaysia	2008 Sultan Azlan Shah Cup
72	9 May 2008	New Zealand	6–3	Ipoh, Malaysia	2008 Sultan Azlan Shah Cup
73	9 May 2008	New Zealand	6–3	Ipoh, Malaysia	2008 Sultan Azlan Shah Cup
74	12 May 2008	Canada	1–2	Ipoh, Malaysia	2008 Sultan Azlan Shah Cup
75	14 May 2008	Belgium	5–3	Ipoh, Malaysia	2008 Sultan Azlan Shah Cup
76	18 May 2008	New Zealand	1–2	Ipoh, Malaysia	2008 Sultan Azlan Shah Cup
77	9 June 2008	Belgium	4–2	Antwerp, Belgium	Test match
78	11 June 2008	Ireland	2–4	Dublin, Ireland	2008 Hockey Setanta Sports Trophy
79	14 June 2008	Canada	2–2	Dublin, Ireland	2008 Hockey Setanta Sports Trophy
80	14 June 2008	Canada	2–2	Dublin, Ireland	2008 Hockey Setanta Sports Trophy
81	15 June 2008	Canada	3–2	Dublin, Ireland	2008 Hockey Setanta Sports Trophy
82	21 August 2008	New Zealand	4–2	Beijing, China	2008 Summer Olympics
83	14 May 2009	Malaysia	4–2	Kuantan, Malaysia	2009 Hockey Asia Cup
84	14 May 2009	Malaysia	4–2	Kuantan, Malaysia	2009 Hockey Asia Cup
85	1 November 2009	Russia	5–0	Lille, France	2009 Hockey World Cup Qualifiers
86	3 November 2009	France	2–4	Lille, France	2009 Hockey World Cup Qualifiers
87	5 November 2009	Japan	1–6	Lille, France	2009 Hockey World Cup Qualifiers
88	5 November 2009	Japan	1–6	Lille, France	2009 Hockey World Cup Qualifiers
89	12 December 2009	India	3–6	Salta, Argentina	2009 Hockey Champions Challenge I
90	12 December 2009	India	3–6	Salta, Argentina	2009 Hockey Champions Challenge I
91	12 December 2009	India	3–6	Salta, Argentina	2009 Hockey Champions Challenge I
92	21 January 2010	Netherlands	2–2	Doha, Qatar	Test match
93	4 March 2010	England	5–2	New Delhi, India	2010 Hockey World Cup
94	6 March 2010	South Africa	4–3	New Delhi, India	2010 Hockey World Cup
95	11 March 2010	Canada	3–2	New Delhi, India	2010 Hockey World Cup
96	12 July 2010	France	4–0	Madrid, Spain	Test match
97	15 July 2010	Spain	1–1	Madrid, Spain	Test match
98	19 July 2010	Netherlands	3–2	Amstelveen, Netherlands	Test match
99	5 October 2010	Scotland	3–0	New Delhi, India	2010 Commonwealth Games
100	6 October 2010	Malaysia	4–1	New Delhi, India	2010 Commonwealth Games
101	7 October 2010	South Africa	2–3	New Delhi, India	2010 Commonwealth Games
102	7 October 2010	South Africa	2–3	New Delhi, India	2010 Commonwealth Games
103	17 November 2010	Hong Kong	12–0	Guangzhou, China	2010 Asian Games
104	17 November 2010	Hong Kong	12–0	Guangzhou, China	2010 Asian Games
105	20 November 2010	India	3–2	Guangzhou, China	2010 Asian Games
106	25 November 2010	Malaysia	2–0	Guangzhou, China	2010 Asian Games
107	6 May 2011	South Korea	4–2	Ipoh, Malaysia	2011 Sultan Azlan Shah Cup
108	15 May 2011	Australia	3–2	Ipoh, Malaysia	2011 Sultan Azlan Shah Cup
109	30 July 2012	Spain	1–1	London, England	2012 Summer Olympics
