= Imran Butt (field hockey) =

Pakistani field hockey player

Personal information
- Born: 16 July 1988 (age 38) Lahore, Pakistan

Sport
- Sport: Field hockey
- Position: Goalkeeper
National team
| Years | Team | Caps | Goals |
| 2012–2018 | Pakistan | 156 | - |
Medal record
Men's field hockey
Representing Pakistan
Asian Games
| Silver medal – second place | 2014 Incheon | Team |
Asia Cup
| Bronze medal – third place | 2013 Ipoh | Team |
Champions Trophy
| Silver medal – second place | 2014 Bhubaneswar | Team |
| Bronze medal – third place | 2012 Melbourne | Team |
Asian Champions Trophy
| Gold medal – first place | 2012 Doha | Team |
| Gold medal – first place | 2013 Kakamigahara | Team |
| Gold medal – first place | 2018 Muscat | Team |
| Silver medal – second place | 2011 Ordos City | Team |
| Silver medal – second place | 2016 Kuantan | Team |
South Asian Games
| Gold medal – first place | 2016 Guwahati | Team |

Imran Butt (born 16 July 1988) is a Pakistani field hockey player who plays as a goalkeeper for the Pakistan national team. He is the brother of former Pakistani Hockey player Rehan Butt.

== International career ==
Butt started his career in 2012. He was one of two goalkeepers in the squad at the 2012 Summer Olympics in London, UK but he didn't play any games because he was one of the reserves. His first call-up for the national team was the 2011 Asian Champions Trophy, but he played his first game for the national team at the 2012 Champions Trophy. He was also a part of the 2018 World Cup squad. He played 156 international matches for Pakistan team and he declared his retirement in Hockey World Cup in Bhubaneswar, India.
