= Hockey Asian Champions Club Cup =

- Sport: Field hockey
- Founded: 1991
- No. of teams: 5 clubs
- Continent: ASHF (Asia)
- Most recent champion: (Pakistan) WAPDA (1st title)
- Most titles: (Malaysia) Ernst & Young HC (Pakistan) WAPDA (Malaysia) Maybank (Japan) Kyojito Co. Ltd (1 title each)

The Hockey Asian Champion Clubs Cup is an Asian field hockey tournament governed by Asian Hockey Federation (ASHF). It is introduced in 1991 for champions of hockey clubs in Asia. Champions from 2008 and upon will be representing Asia to the Hockey World Clubs Championship which started 2009 in Barcelona, Spain.

== Champions ==
Year	Host	Final
Year	Host	Champion	Score	Runner-up
1991	Kuala Lumpur, Malaysia	(Malaysia) Maybank HC		(Pakistan) Karachi Electric Club
1995	Lahore, Pakistan	(Japan) Kyojito Co. Ltd.		(Malaysia) Maybank HC
2008	Kuala Lumpur, Malaysia	(Malaysia) Ernst & Young HC	7–2	(Pakistan) Gojra Club
2010	Matale, Sri Lanka	(Pakistan) WAPDA	2–0	(Malaysia) KL Hockey Club
