= Gabriel Ho-Garcia =

Canadian field hockey player

Personal information
- Full name: Gabriel Wing-Chuen Ho-Garcia
- Born: May 19, 1993 (age 33) Burnaby, British Columbia, Canada
- Height: 1.70 m (5 ft 7 in)
- Weight: 70 kg (154 lb)

Sport
- Sport: Field hockey
- Position: Midfielder / Forward
- Club: Club de Campo
Senior career
Years	Team	Caps	Goals
2016	Midlands	-	-
2017–2018	Uhlenhorst Mülheim	-	-
2018–2019	Mannheimer HC	-	-
2019–	Club de Campo	-	-
National team
Years	Team	Caps	Goals
2013–	Canada	133	(19)
Medal record
Men's field hockey
Representing Canada
Pan American Games
Silver medal – second place	2015 Toronto	Team

Gabriel Wing-Chuen Ho-Garcia (born May 19, 1993) is a Canadian male field hockey player, who played for the Canada national field hockey team at the 2015 Pan American Games and won a silver medal. He was also named to the 2015 Pan-American Elite Team, one of the top 16 players in the Americas.

== Career ==
In 2016, he was named to Canada's Olympic team, where the team finished in 11th place. In June 2021, Ho-Garcia was named to Canada's 2020 Summer Olympics team.
