= Malaysia Hockey League =

- Current season, competition or edition: 2023 Malaysia Hockey League
- Sport: Field hockey
- Founded: 1987; 39 years ago
- No. of teams: 8
- Country: Malaysia
- Most recent champion: Terengganu (6th title) (2023)
- Most titles: KL Hockey Club (9 titles)
- Broadcaster: Astro Arena
- Sponsor: Tenaga Nasional Berhad

The Malaysia Hockey League (MHL) is a top league competition for field hockey clubs in the Malaysian hockey league system. There are, at present, seven teams in the Malaysia Hockey League. The competition has been played since 1987. At present also it is sponsored by Tenaga Nasional Berhad.

== Current season ==
The 2023 Malaysia Hockey League is the current season.

== Teams ==
The following teams are participating in 2020 Malaysia Hockey League.

=== Premier Division ===
- Terengganu Hockey Team
- (Federal Territories of Malaysia) Tenaga Nasional Berhad Hockey Club
- (Federal Territories of Malaysia) UniKL Hockey Club
- (Negeri Sembilan) Maybank Hockey Club
- (Federal Territories of Malaysia) TNB Thunderbolts

=== Division 1 ===
- (Penang) Nur Insafi HC
- (Selangor) UiTM HC
- (Federal Territories of Malaysia) ATM Airod HC
- (Federal Territories of Malaysia) Bukit Jalil Sports School
- (Johor) Sekolah Sukan Tengku Mahkota Ismail
- (Perak) Majlis Bandaraya Ipoh HC
- (Federal Territories of Malaysia) Politeknik Malaysia

=== Former teams ===
- Yayasan Negeri Sembilan HC
- DeTas-Yayasan Pahang HC
- (Federal Territories of Malaysia) Kuala Lumpur City Hall HC
- (Federal Territories of Malaysia) Bank Simpanan Nasional HC
- (Selangor) MBf
- (Perak) Dolphins HC
- (Federal Territories of Malaysia) Sapura Hockey Club
- (Federal Territories of Malaysia) Kuala Lumpur Hockey Club
- (Northern Territory) NT Stingers

== History ==
=== Origin ===
The tournament was initiated to revive interest in the sport which was losing spectator interest to football in recent times. Hockey is one of Malaysia's major sports. The field hockey in Malaysia has been the main sport to choose when playing at a high level.

One of the main reasons for the waning popularity of the existing domestic competition was the rise of corporate teams such as Ernst & Young, Tenaga Nasional Berhad and Maybank which do not have a steady fan following. Malaysia Hockey League is trying to change that by bringing in regional flavor. It fields teams from traditional hockey bastions such as Kuala Lumpur, Penang, Malacca, Negeri Sembilan, Perak, other areas, as well as from other places where it has got some fan following.

== Founding ==
The competition was first played in 2000 involving 11 teams. Initiated by Malaysian Hockey Federation (MHF) with active support from sports channel ESPN Malaysia. The first season had two tiers division 1 and division 2 but from 2007 season onwards division 2 was scrapped. Except team winning 2006 division 2 championship rest all teams in division 2 were scrapped.

== Competition ==
=== New format ===
The new Malaysia Hockey League (MHL) will see 10 teams vying for glory in the top division. Last year, only six teams competed in Division One and Division Two had nine teams. Under the new format, the elite teams will compete in the Premier Division while the rest will vie for a place in Division One. These two divisions are for the Open category.

Division Two and Division Three will be for the Under-19 age groups and will comprise teams from last year's Malaysia Junior Hockey League (MJHL). Last year's top five Malaysia Hockey League teams — Ernst & Young HC, Sapura HC, Maybank HC, Tenaga Nasional Berhad HC and Nur Insafi HC — will be joined by Jurutera Jentera Letrik HC (JLJ) in the Premier Division.

The competitions committee will select another four teams, based on their strength, for the Premier Division. There are plans to enter the National Juniors (the 2013 Project Team) in the Premier Division. But a decision will be made once the format is approved by the Malaysian Hockey Federation's management committee.

The Division Two champions will have the right to gain promotion to Division One or they can choose to remain in the Under-19 category. The bottom two teams from the Premier Division]will be demoted while the top two from Division One will go up the following year. Division Two and Division Three will kick off in February 2009 while Division One is slated to start in May 2009. The Premier Division will run from October to December 2009.

=== Malaysia Junior Hockey League return ===
After 10 months of merging the Malaysia Junior Hockey League (MJHL) with the senior Malaysia Hockey League (MHL), the Malaysian Hockey Federation (MHF) had decided to separate them. The Malaysia Junior Hockey League thus return on the Malaysia Hockey Federation calendar next year, 2010 with the starting date set for 25 March. It will remain an Under-19 tournament.

== Players ==
A team shall consist of a maximum of 18 (eighteen) players to be registered with the Malaysia Hockey Federation. All 18 players in a team have to be registered with the MHF and need to submit their identity cards before the start of the league qualifying for playing in a team. All Malaysian players currently employed have to be taken on lien for the duration of the league and then be registered with Malaysia Hockey Federation. All the foreign players must obtain International Transfer Certificates from their respective countries and or clubs before signing up with the team in Malaysia Hockey League and Malaysia Hockey Federation.

=== Import players ===
There are a number of players from countries other than Malaysia, who have been contracted to play in the league.

== List of champions ==
Season	League champions (Number of titles)	TNB Cup (Number of titles)
1987	RMN Dolphins (1)	Kilat (1)
1988	UAB (1)	Maybank (1)
1989	RMN Dolphins (2)	Kilat (2)
1990	Kilat (1)	Maybank (2)
1991–92	Kilat (2)	Kilat (3)
1992–93	Yayasan Negeri Sembilan (1)	MBf HC (1)
1994	Maybank (1)	Maybank (3)
1995	Maybank (2)	Yayasan Negeri Sembilan (1)
1996	Yayasan Negeri Sembilan (2)	Yayasan Negeri Sembilan (2)
1997	MPPJ (1)	MPPJ (1)
1999	Bank Simpanan Nasional (1)	Bank Simpanan Nasional (1)
2000–01	Tenaga Nasional Berhad (3)	Bank Simpanan Nasional (2)
2002	Tenaga Nasional Berhad (4)	Bank Simpanan Nasional (3)
2003	Tenaga Nasional Berhad (5)	Tenaga Nasional Berhad (4)
2004	Sapura (1)	Tenaga Nasional Berhad (5)
2005	Sapura (2)	Sapura (1)
2006	Ernst & Young (1)	Sapura (2)
2007	Ernst & Young (2)	Tenaga Nasional Berhad (6)
2008	Ernst & Young (3)	Ernst & Young (1)
2009–10	KLHC (4)	Tenaga Nasional Berhad (7)
2010–11	KLHC (5)	KLHC (2)
2011–12	KLHC (6)	KLHC (3)
2012	KLHC (7)	KLHC (4)
2013	KLHC (8)	KLHC (5) & TNB Thunderbolts (1)
2014	Terengganu (1)	Terengganu (1)
2015	Terengganu (2)	Terengganu (2)
2016	Terengganu (3)	Terengganu (3)
2017	KLHC (9)	Terengganu (4)
2018	Terengganu (4)	UniKL (1)
2019	UniKL (1)	Terengganu (5)
2020	UniKL (2)	UniKL (2)
2021	UniKL (3)	Terengganu (6)
2022	Terengganu (5)	Tenaga Nasional Berhad (8)
2023	Terengganu (6)	Terengganu(7)
2024	Tenaga Nasional Berhad (6)	Tenaga Nasional Berhad (9)
2025	Terengganu (7)	Terengganu(8)
2026	TBD	TBD

== Champions ==
=== By club ===
Team	League championships	Season(s) won	TNB Cups	Season(s) won
KLHC	9 (Note: Includes 3 titles as Ernst & Young)	2006, 2007, 2008, 2009–10, 2010–11, 2011–12, 2012, 2013, 2017	5 (Note: Includes 1 title as Ernst & Young)	2008, 2010–11, 2011–12, 2012, 2013
Terengganu	7	2014, 2015, 2016, 2018, 2022, 2023, 2025	8	2014, 2015, 2016, 2017, 2019, 2021, 2023, 2025
Tenaga Nasional Berhad	6 (Note: Includes 2 titles as Kilat)	1990, 1991–92, 2000–01, 2002, 2003, 2024	9 (Note: Includes 3 titles as Kilat)	1987, 1989, 1991–92, 2003, 2004, 2007, 2009–10, 2022, 2024
UniKL	3	2019, 2020, 2021	2	2018, 2020
Maybank	2	1994, 1995	3	1988, 1990, 1994
Yayasan Negeri Sembilan	2	1992–93, 1996	2	1995, 1996
Sapura	2	2004, 2005	2	2005, 2006
RMN Dolphins	2	1987, 1989	0	
Bank Simpanan Nasional	1	1999	3	1999, 2000–01, 2002
MPPJ	1	1997	1	1997
UAB	1	1988	0	
MBf HC	0		1	1992–93
TNB Thunderbolts	0		1	2013

== Players ==
=== Top scorers ===
Season	Players	Clubs	Goals
2018			
2017			
2016			
2015			
2014			
2013			
2012	(Malaysia) Faizal Saari	(Federal Territories of Malaysia) Tenaga Nasional Berhad HC	20
2011-12	(Malaysia) Faizal Saari	(Federal Territories of Malaysia) Tenaga Nasional Berhad HC	19
2010-11	(Malaysia) Razie Rahim	(Federal Territories of Malaysia) KLHC	27
2009-10	(Malaysia) Mohammad Amin Rahim	(Federal Territories of Malaysia) Tenaga Nasional Berhad HC	15
2008	(Malaysia) Baljit Singh Sarjab	(Federal Territories of Malaysia) Ernst & Young HC	13
2007	(Malaysia) Jiwa Mohan	(Federal Territories of Malaysia) Sapura HC	23
2006	(Malaysia) Mohammad Amin Rahim	(Federal Territories of Malaysia) Ernst & Young HC	29
2005	(India) Len Aiyappa	(Federal Territories of Malaysia) Telekom Malaysia HC	30
2004	(India) Len Aiyappa	(Federal Territories of Malaysia) Bank Simpanan Nasional HC	37
2003	(India) Len Aiyappa	(Federal Territories of Malaysia) Ernst & Young HC	35
2002			
2001	(Malaysia) Mirnawan Nawawi	(Federal Territories of Malaysia) Bank Simpanan Nasional HC	19
2000			
1999	(Malaysia) Kuhan Shanmuganathan	(Federal Territories of Malaysia) Bank Simpanan Nasional HC	
1998			
1997	(Malaysia) Kuhan Shanmuganathan	(Federal Territories of Malaysia) MPPJ HC	
1996	(Malaysia) Mirnawan Nawawi	Yayasan Negeri Sembilan HC	
1995			
1994			
1993			
1992			
1991			
1990			
1989			
1988			
1987			

=== Best player ===
Season	Malaysia Hockey League	Malaysia Junior Hockey League
2013		
2012		
2011-12	(Malaysia) Azlan Misron ( (Federal Territories of Malaysia) KLHC)	(Malaysia) Firhan Ashaari ( (Johor) BPSS-Thunderbolts)
2010-11	(Malaysia) Tengku Ahmad Tajuddin ( (Federal Territories of Malaysia) KLHC)	(Malaysia) Firhan Ashaari ( (Johor) BPSS-Thunderbolts)
2009-10		
2008		
2007		(Malaysia) R. Nadesh ( (Federal Territories of Malaysia) BJSS)
2006	(Malaysia) Jiwa Mohan ( (Federal Territories of Malaysia) Sapura HC)	
2005	(Malaysia) Kuhan Shanmuganathan ( (Federal Territories of Malaysia) Sapura HC)	
2004		
2003		
2002		
2001	(Malaysia) Kumar Subramaniam ( (Federal Territories of Malaysia) Tenaga Nasional Berhad HC)	
2000		
1999		
1998		
1997		
1996	(Malaysia) Mirnawan Nawawi ( Yayasan Negeri Sembilan)	
1995		
1994		
1993		
1992		
1991		
1990		
1989		
1988		
1987		

== Sponsor ==
The Malaysia Hockey League become the popular league in Asia because the Malaysia Hockey League has been sponsored by the many big companies:

- AirAsia
- Kappa
- F&N
- Grays
- Chilis

== Prize money ==
The champions of the league will be given MYR 9,000,000 and also the league trophy which was made in 1987.

== See also ==
- Malaysia Junior Hockey League
- Malaysian Hockey Federation
- Malaysia men's national field hockey team
- Malaysia women's national field hockey team
