= Marhan Jalil =

Malaysian field hockey player (born 1990)

Personal information
- Full name: Muhammad Marhan Mohd Jalil
- Born: 5 March 1990 (age 36) Muar, Johor, Malaysia

Sport
- Sport: Field hockey
- Position: Midfielder
Senior career
Years	Team	Caps	Goals
–	UniKL HC; Sapura HC	-	-
National team
Years	Team	Caps	Goals
–	Malaysia		-
Medal record
Men's field hockey
Representing Malaysia
Asian Games
Silver medal – second place	2010 Guangzhou	Team
Silver medal – second place	2018 Jakarta-Palembang	Team
Asia Cup
Silver medal – second place	2017 Dhaka
Silver medal – second place	2022 Jakarta
Bronze medal – third place	2025 Rajgir
Asian Champions Trophy
Silver medal – second place	2023 Chennai
Bronze medal – third place	2011 Ordos City
Bronze medal – third place	2012 Doha
Bronze medal – third place	2016 Kuantan
Bronze medal – third place	2018 Muscat
Southeast Asian Games
Gold medal – first place	2017 Kuala Lumpur	Team

Muhammad Marhan Mohd Jalil (born 5 March 1990) is a Malaysian field hockey player who plays as a midfielder.

== Biography ==
Marhan was born in Muar, Johor.
