= Kang Moon-kyu =

South Korean field hockey player (born 1988)

- Hangul: 강문규
- RR: Gang Mungyu
- MR: Kang Mun'gyu

Kang Moon-kyu
Medal record

Men's field hockey

Representing South Korea

Asian Games
Bronze medal – third place	2014 Incheon	Team

Kang Moon-kyu (born 24 April 1988, in Seoul) is a South Korean field hockey player. At the 2012 Summer Olympics, he competed for the national team in the men's tournament. His twin brother, Kang Moon-kweon, is also an Olympic field hockey player.
