= Nabil Fiqri =

Malaysian field hockey player (born 1987)

Personal information
- Full name: Nabil Fiqri Mohammad Noor
- Born: 14 April 1987 (age 39) Negeri Sembilan, Malaysia

Sport
- Sport: Field hockey
- Position: Midfielder, Forward
Senior career
Years	Team	Caps	Goals
2006–	Ernst & Young / Kuala Lumpur HC	-	-
National team
Years	Team	Caps	Goals
2007–	Malaysia	233	-
Medal record
Men's field hockey
Representing Malaysia
Asian Games
Silver medal – second place	2010 Guangzhou	Team
Silver medal – second place	2018 Jakarta-Palembang	Team
Asia Cup
Silver medal – second place	2017 Dhaka	Team
Asian Champions Trophy
Bronze medal – third place	2011 Ordos City	Team
Bronze medal – third place	2012 Doha	Team
Bronze medal – third place	2016 Kuantan	Team
Bronze medal – third place	2018 Muscat	Team
Southeast Asian Games
Gold medal – first place	2017 Kuala Lumpur	Team

Nabil Fiqri Mohammad Noor (born 14 April 1987) is a Malaysian field hockey player who plays as a midfielder or forward. He first joined the national team in 2006 and was fielded as a forward before changing position in midfield.

== Biography ==
Nabil was born in Negeri Sembilan, and graduated in University Putra Malaysia.

In 2016, Nabil have been undergoing inspector training at the Police Training Centre in Kuala Lumpur.
