= Maybank Hockey Club =

Maybank HC
- Full name: Maybank Hockey Club
- League: Malaysia Hockey League
- Home ground: Seremban Hockey Stadium; Seremban, Negeri Sembilan; Malaysia

Personnel
- Captain: (Malaysia)
- Manager: (Malaysia) Abdul Rahim Musa
Home	Away

The Maybank HC are the Malaysia Hockey League (MHL) team from Seremban, Negeri Sembilan, Malaysia.

== Players ==
=== First team ===
Note: Flags indicate national team as defined under FIFA eligibility rules; some limited exceptions apply. Players may hold more than one non-FIFA nationality.

No.	Pos.	Nation	Player
15	GK	MAS	Abdul Hakim Adnan
1		MAS	Engku Abdul Malek Engku Mohamad
2		MAS	K. Gobinathan
3		MAS	Azrul Effendi Bistaman
4		MAS	Mohd Muhsin Hamsani
5		MAS	Shahrin Mohamad
6		MAS	Mohd Hafizuddin Mat Desa
7	FW	MAS	Chairil Anwar A. Aziz
8		MAS	N. Ugentheran
9		MAS	Suhairi Saidi
10		MAS	Hang Edzhar Syah Hang Tuah
11		MAS	Mohd Fadzli Anuar
12		MAS	Nor Ikram Sulaiman
13		MAS	Mohamad Syafiq Mohamed Zain

No.	Pos.	Nation	Player
14		MAS	Manraj Singh Sarjit Singh
15	FW	MAS	Amirullah Zainol
16	GK	MAS	Mohd Hanafi Hassan
17		MAS	Mohd Riduan Mohamad Nasir
18		MAS	Muhd Afif Akmal Salim
19		MAS	B. Namasivayam
20		MAS	Hairul Nizam Ab Rani
21		MAS	Mohd Sybrie Shamsudin
22		MAS	Hafifihafiz Hanafi
—		PAK	Shakeel Abbasi
—		PAK	Mohd Waqas
—		NZL	Aiden Mitchell

=== Notable players ===
- (Singapore) Muhammad Anuar Ali - 2005

== Club officials ==
=== Coaching and medical staff ===
- Manager: (Malaysia) Abdul Rahim Musa
- Chief coach: (Malaysia) Wallace Tan

=== Chief coach history ===
Season	Coach
2005–present	(Malaysia) S. Velappan
2004	(Malaysia) Wallace Tan

== Honours ==
- Malaysia Hockey League titles

Winners (2): 1994, 199

- MHL-TNB Cup/Overall champions

Winners (1): 1990

- Hockey Asian Champion Clubs Cup title

Winners (1): 1991
Runner-up (1): 1995

== See also ==
- Malaysia Hockey League
