= Mamunur Rahman Chayan =

Bangladeshi field hockey player

Personal information
- Born: December Faridpur, Dhaka, Bangladesh

Sport
- Sport: Field hockey
Senior career
Years	Team	Caps	Goals
2022	Metro Express Barishal	-	-
National team
Years	Team	Caps	Goals
–	Bangladesh	Na	(Na)

Mamunur Rahman Chayan (Bengali: মামুনুর রহমান চয়ন) is a Bangladeshi former field hockey player. He was the captain of the Bangladesh national field hockey team.
