= Sukri Mutalib =

Malaysian field hockey player (born 1986)

Personal information
- Full name: Mohamad Sukri Abdul Mutalib
- Born: 24 February 1986 (age 40) Perak, Malaysia
- Height: 1.67 m (5 ft 6 in)

Sport
- Sport: Field hockey
- Position: Midfielder
Senior career
Years	Team	Caps	Goals
2005	Bank Simpanan Nasional HC	-	-
2006–2011	Ernst & Young / Kuala Lumpur HC	-	-
2011	Southern Hotshots	-	-
2012–	Kuala Lumpur HC	-	-
National team
Years	Team	Caps	Goals
2007–	Malaysia	335	(1)
Medal record
Men's field hockey
Representing Malaysia
Asian Games
Silver medal – second place	2010 Guangzhou	Team
Silver medal – second place	2018 Jakarta-Palembang	Team
Asia Cup
Bronze medal – third place	2007 Chennai	Team
Silver medal – second place	2017 Dhaka	Team
Asian Champions Trophy
Bronze medal – third place	2011 Ordos	Team
Bronze medal – third place	2013 Kakamigahara	Team
Bronze medal – third place	2016 Kuantan	Team
Southeast Asian Games
Gold medal – first place	2017 Kuala Lumpur	Team

Mohamad Sukri Abdul Mutalib (born 24 February 1986) is a Malaysian field hockey player.

Sukri has been playing in the MHL since 2005 where he represented Bank Simpanan Nasional before moving to Ernst & Young the following year. He stuck with KLHC, who are in fact a continuation of E&Y.

Prior to the MHL, Sukri played for Bandar Penawar Sports School in the Junior Hockey League from 1999 to 2001 after which the sports schools combined and played in the MJHL as a team from 2002 to 2004.

It was during the MJHL that his talent was spotted by former national coach Paul Lissek and Sukri was drafted into the national training squad when he was only 16.

He made his international debut in 2003 against China in a test match played at the Tun Razak Stadium, at 17 years old, making him one of the youngest players to don national senior colours.

In June 2011, Sukri started his overseas career along with another Malaysian Faizal Saari. They were selected by the Southern Hotshots team for the Australian Hockey League.
