= Kumar Subramaniam =

Malaysian hockey goal keeper (born 1979)

Personal information
- Born: 26 November 1979 (age 46) Tampin, Malaysia

Sport
- Sport: Field hockey
- Position: Goalkeeper
Senior career
Years	Team	Caps	Goals
–	Tenaga Nasional	-	-
2012	Uttar Pradesh Wizards	-	-
National team
Years	Team	Caps	Goals
1999–2019	Malaysia	323	(0)
Medal record
Men's field hockey
Representing Malaysia
Asian Games
Silver medal – second place	2010 Guangzhou	Team
Silver medal – second place	2018 Jakarta-Palembang	Team
Bronze medal – third place	2002 Busan	Team
Asia Cup
Silver medal – second place	2017 Dhaka
Commonwealth Games
Bronze medal – third place	2006 Melbourne	Team
Asian Champions Trophy
Bronze medal – third place	2011 Ordos
Bronze medal – third place	2012 Doha
Bronze medal – third place	2013 Kakamigahara
Bronze medal – third place	2016 Kuantan
Bronze medal – third place	2018 Muscat
Southeast Asian Games
Gold medal – first place	1999 Bandar Seri Bengawan
Gold medal – first place	2017 Kuala Lumpur	Team

Kumar Subramaniam (born 26 November 1979) is a Malaysian field hockey player who played as a goalkeeper for the Malaysian national team.

He also played with the Tenaga Nasional Berhad HC in the Malaysia Hockey League. He wore the number 16 both for Tenaga Nasional Berhad HC and Malaysian hockey team.

== International career ==
He is named as the goalkeeper for the Asian All-Stars 2010 along with Salman Akbar of Pakistan. He also named as the Best Goalkeeper for the 2009 Men's Hockey Asia Cup. In 2012, Kumar became the first goalkeeper from Malaysia playing in a foreign league. He played for Uttar Pradesh Wizards in the Hockey India League. Despite having been in the national team for more than a decade, the Tampin-born Kumar has never featured in the Olympics but has played in two world cups After 20 years, Kumar announced his retirement on 20 February 2020.
