= Tengku Ahmad Tajuddin =

Malaysian field hockey player (born 1986)

Personal information
- Full name: Tengku Ahmad Tajuddin bin Tengku Abdul Jalil
- Born: 5 January 1986 (age 40) Kangar, Perlis, Malaysia
- Height: 1.64 m (5 ft 5 in)

Sport
- Sport: Field hockey
- Position: Forward
Senior career
Years	Team	Caps	Goals
2002	Sapura HC	-	-
2003–12	Ernst & Young / Kuala Lumpur HC	-	-
2008	Hilversum HC	-	-
2013–	Terengganu HT	-	-
2016	Uddy HC	-	-
National team
Years	Team	Caps	Goals
2005–	Malaysia	214	-
Medal record
Men's field hockey
Representing Malaysia
Asian Games
Silver medal – second place	2010 Guangzhou	Team
Silver medal – second place	2018 Jakarta-Palembang	Team
Commonwealth Games
Bronze medal – third place	2006 Melbourne	Team
Asia Cup
Silver medal – second place	2017 Dhaka
Bronze medal – third place	2007 Chennai
Asian Champions Trophy
Bronze medal – third place	2011 Ordos City
Bronze medal – third place	2012 Doha
Bronze medal – third place	2018 Muscat
SEA Games
Gold medal – first place	2013 Naypyidaw	Team
Gold medal – first place	2017 Kuala Lumpur	Team
Sultan Azlan Shah Cup
Silver medal – second place	2013 Ipoh
Silver medal – second place	2014 Ipoh

Tengku Ahmad Tajuddin bin Tengku Abdul Jalil (born 5 January 1986) is a Malaysian field hockey player.

Tengku Ahmad is part of Malaysian 2010 Asian Games hockey squad that won the silver medal. Nicknamed as 'Zidane', Tengku Ahmad made his international senior debut in 2005. He also part of Malaysia's 2005 World Junior hockey squad.

Tengku Ahmad made his debut in the MHL in 2002 and featured for Sapura for one year before joining Ernst and Young, who became KL HC. In 2008, Tengku Ahmad had a stint with Dutch side Hilversum HC. In 2013, he joined Terengganu Hockey Team.
