= Azlan Misron =

Malaysian field hockey player (born 1983)

Personal information
- Full name: Azlan Misron
- Born: 21 May 1983 (age 43) Perak, Malaysia
- Height: 1.7 m (5 ft 7 in)

Sport
- Sport: Field hockey
- Position: Forward, Midfielder, Defender
Senior career
Years	Team	Caps	Goals
200?–2012	Ernst & Young / Kuala Lumpur HC	-	-
2013–	Terengganu HT	-	-
National team
Years	Team	Caps	Goals
2002–	Malaysia	314	-
Medal record
Men's field hockey
Representing Malaysia
Asian Games
Silver medal – second place	2010 Guangzhou	Team
Commonwealth Games
Bronze medal – third place	2006 Melbourne	Team
Men's Hockey Asia Cup
Bronze medal – third place	2007 Chennai	Team
Asian Champions Trophy
Bronze medal – third place	2012 Doha	Team
Bronze medal – third place	2013 Kakamigahara	Team
SEA Games
Gold medal – first place	2013 Naypyidaw	Team
Sultan Azlan Shah Cup
Silver medal – second place	2013 Ipoh	Team
Silver medal – second place	2014 Ipoh	Team
Hockey Champions Challenge I
Bronze medal – third place	2014 Kuantan	Team

Azlan Misron (born 21 May 1983) is a field hockey player from Chepor, Perak, Malaysia. He is the skipper of Malaysia hockey team in 2008.

He made his debut for the national team in the Sultan Azlan Shah Cup in 2002. He also the skipper of KL HC from 2006 until 2012. In 2013, he joined Terengganu Hockey Team.
