= Razie Rahim =

Malaysian field hockey player (born 1987)

Personal information
- Full name: Muhammad Razie Abd Rahim
- Born: 25 August 1987 (age 38)

Sport
- Sport: Field hockey
- Position: Defender
Senior career
Years	Team	Caps	Goals
2006–2019	Kuala Lumpur HC	-	-
2019–	UniKL	-	-
National team
Years	Team	Caps	Goals
2006–	Malaysia	330	(143)
Medal record
Men's field hockey
Representing Malaysia
Asian Games
Silver medal – second place	2010 Guangzhou	Team
Silver medal – second place	2018 Jakarta-Palembang	Team
Asia Cup
Silver medal – second place	2017 Dhaka
Silver medal – second place	2022 Jakarta
Asian Champions Trophy
Silver medal – second place	2023 Chennai
Bronze medal – third place	2011 Ordos
Bronze medal – third place	2012 Doha
Bronze medal – third place	2013 Kakamigahara
Bronze medal – third place	2016 Kuantan
Southeast Asian Games
Gold medal – first place	2017 Kuala Lumpur	Team

Muhammad Razie Abdul Rahim (born 25 August 1987) is a Malaysian field hockey player who plays as a defender. He is known as the penalty corner specialist. He also top scorer in Malaysia, no 16 in asia continent and no 42 in the world for national level.

== Personal life ==
He holds a master's in human resource management at University Putra Malaysia. In 2016, he reported as one of the Royal Malaysian Police (PDRM) trainers.

== Career ==
Razie made his debut in the Malaysia Hockey League in 2006 for Ernst and Young (Kuala Lumpur Hockey Club). He emerged as the league top scorer in 2011 season. In the 2019 Malaysia Hockey League, he played for UniKL.

Razie made his senior international debut in the 2006 Sultan Azlan Shah Cup.
