= Malaysian Hockey Confederation =

Governing body of field hockey in Malaysia

Malaysia Hockey Confederation
- Sport: Field Hockey
- Category: Games
- Abbreviation: MHC
- Founded: 15 August 1953; 73 years ago
- Headquarters: Malaysia National Hockey Stadium, Kuala Lumpur
- President: Subahan Kamal
- CEO: S. Nishel Kumar
- Men's coach: Arul Selvaraj
- Women's coach: Nasihini Ibrahim

Official website
- www.mhc.org.my

The Malaysian Hockey Confederation (MHC; Malay: Konfederasi Hoki Malaysia) is the national governing body for Malaysia men's national field hockey team, Malaysia women's national field hockey team, Malaysia national under-21 field hockey team, Malaysia national women's under-21 field hockey team, Malaysia national indoor hockey team and Malaysia national women's indoor hockey team than also manage the field hockey in Malaysia. It is affiliated to the Asian Hockey Federation (AHF) and member of the International Hockey Federation (FIH). The current MHC president is Dato' Sri Subahan Kamal.

== Presidents ==
1. Tun Abdul Razak (1957–1976)
2. Sultan Azlan Shah (2002–2004)
3. Raja Nazrin Shah (2004–2006)
4. Mohammad Anwar Mohammad Nor (19 Dec 2006 – 1 November 2008)
5. Tengku Abdullah Sultan Ahmad Shah (1 Nov 2008 – 13 May 2015)
6. Subahan Kamal (13 May 2015 – present)

== Tournaments and events ==
- Malaysia Hockey League
- Malaysia Junior Hockey League
- Sultan Azlan Shah Cup
- Sultan of Johor Cup

== See also ==
- Malaysia men's national field hockey team
- Malaysia women's national field hockey team
