= Kim Young-jin =

South Korean field hockey player (born 1984)

- Hangul: 김영진
- RR: Gim Yeongjin
- MR: Kim Yŏngjin

Kim Young-jin
Medal record

Men's field hockey

Representing South Korea

Asian Games
Bronze medal – third place	2014 Incheon	Team

Asia Cup
Gold medal – first place	2013 Ipoh	

Kim Young-jin (born August 29, 1984) is a South Korean field hockey player. At the 2012 Summer Olympics, he competed for the national team in the men's tournament.
