= Yayasan Negeri Sembilan HC =

Malaysia Hockey League team

- Full name: Yayasan Negeri Sembilan Hockey Club
- League: Malaysia Hockey League
- Founded: 1987; 39 years ago
- Home ground: Seremban Hockey Stadium; Negeri Sembilan; Malaysia (Capacity 15000)

Personnel
- Captain: (Malaysia) Shakeel Abassi
- Manager: (Malaysia) P. Tamilselvan
Home	Away

The Yayasan Negeri Sembilan HC are the Malaysia Hockey League (MHL) team from Seremban, Negeri Sembilan, Malaysia. The team is led by Nasir Ahmed, a member of the ex-Pakistan national field hockey team. Yayasan Negeri Sembilan can also be the giants of the Malaysia Hockey League because many good import players come from this club, such as Muhammad Waqas.

Yayasan Negeri Sembilan HC is a successful team in the Malaysia Hockey League. They won the title league twice in the 1994-1995 and 1995–1996 seasons.

== Players ==
=== First team ===
Note: Flags indicate national team as defined under FIFA eligibility rules; some limited exceptions apply. Players may hold more than one non-FIFA nationality.

No.	Pos.	Nation	Player
1	GK	PAK	Nasir Ahmed
2	DF	PAK	Ihsan Ullah Khan
3	DF	PAK	Shahbaz Ali
4	MF	MAS	Muhammad Zulfadli
5	MF	MAS	Jasdev Singh Dhilon
6	MF	PAK	Muhammad Mudassar
7	DF	PAK	Aamir Shahzad
8	MF	MAS	Muhammad Hafiz Zakaria
9	DF	MAS	Muhamad Nor Hafiq Abd Ghafar
10		MAS	Mohd Fitri Abu Bakar
11		IND	Prabhjot Singh

No.	Pos.	Nation	Player
12		MAS	Muhd Zulfadli Muhd Isa
13		MAS	Mohd Fahmi Faiz Mad Isa
14		MAS	Mohd Redza Maadun
15		MAS	Razlee Amree Mustafar
16		MAS	Tarun Thammannah
17		MAS	Rageswaran Maniam
18		MAS	Mohd Sabri Mohammad
19		MAS	Md Mosiur Rahman Biplop
20		MAS	Sarvaswaran Sreedharan
21		MAS	Arvind

=== Former players ===
- (India) Pargat Singh
- (India) Jude Felix
- (India) N. Mukesh Kumar
- (Malaysia) Sarjit Singh
- (Malaysia) Soon Mustapha
- (Malaysia) Gurmit Singh
- (Malaysia) Stephen van Huizen
- (Malaysia) Mirnawan Nawawi
- (Malaysia) Norhamezi Omar

== Club officials ==
=== Coaching and medical staff ===
- Manager: (Malaysia) P. Tamilselvan
- Chief coach: (Malaysia) Rajan Krishnan
- Physiotherapist: (Malaysia) Prem Ghanesh Chandra Segeran

=== Chief coach history ===
Season	Coach
2005–2010	(Malaysia) Muhammad Dharma Raj Abdullah
2010–2011	(India) P. Madhu Karan
2011–2012	(Malaysia) Rajan Krishnan

== Honours ==
- Malaysia Hockey League titles : 2 (1994-1995 & 1995–1996)
- MHL-TNB Cup/Overall Champions Titles : 2 (1994 & 1995)

== See also ==
- Malaysia Hockey League
