= UniKL Hockey Club =

Malaysian field hockey club

UniKL
- Full name: Universiti Kuala Lumpur Hockey Club
- League: Malaysia Hockey League
- Home ground: National Hockey Stadium, Kuala Lumpur, Malaysia

Universiti Kuala Lumpur Hockey Club, commonly known as UniKL HC or UniKL is a Malaysian field hockey club based in Kuala Lumpur. It plays in the Malaysia Hockey League.

== Players ==
=== Current squad ===
As of January 2020

No.	Pos.	Nation	Player
1	GK	IRE	David Harte
2		MAS	Jagraj Singh
3		MAS	Ashran Hamsani
4		MAS	Sharul Nazli
6	MF	MAS	Marhan Jalil (C)
7		MAS	Hafiz Zainol
8		MAS	Firdaus Ahmad Tajuddin
9		MAS	Faridzul Mohd
10	FW	NED	Roel Bovendeert
11		MAS	Faid Farhad Shah
12	DF	MAS	Sukri Mutalib

No.	Pos.	Nation	Player
13		MAS	Farhan Zain
17	DF	MAS	Razie Rahim
18	DF	AUS	Tim Deavin
19	GK	MAS	Adrian Albert
20		MAS	Firdaus Fauzi
21		MAS	Rafizul Mustafa
22		MAS	Baljit Singh
23	FW	MAS	Tengku Ahmad Tajuddin
25		MAS	Najmi Jazlan
27		AUS	Kieran Govers

== Honours ==
Malaysia Hockey League: 1

Winners (2): 2019, 2020

- Malaysia Junior Hockey League overall titles

Winners (1): 2009-10
