= Terengganu Hockey Team =

- Full name: Terengganu Hockey Team
- League: Malaysia Hockey League
- Founded: 2013; 13 years ago
- Home ground: MBKT Hockey Stadium, Kuala Terengganu
Home	Away

Terengganu Hockey Team (Malay: Pasukan Hoki Terengganu), is a professional hockey club based in Kuala Terengganu, Terengganu, Malaysia, that competes in Malaysia Premier League, the first division of the Malaysian Hockey League. The club was founded as Terengganu Hockey Team in 2013.

== Players ==
=== Current squad ===
As of January 2020

No.	Pos.	Nation	Player
1		MAS	Nabil Abdullah
4		MAS	Izzudin Shamsuri
5		MAS	Firdaus Omar
6		MAS	Shazwi Rani
7	MF	MAS	Fitri Saari
8		MAS	Ismat Rohulamin
9		MAS	Luqman Ahmad Shukran
10	FW	MAS	Faizal Saari
11		KOR	Jung Man-jae
12		MAS	Azlan Wan Rozaimi
13		MAS	Khalid Hamirin

No.	Pos.	Nation	Player
14	MF	PAK	Muhammad Umar Bhutta
15	MF	MAS	Nabil Fiqri
16	DF	PAK	Ammad Butt
17		MAS	Matma Nathan
19		MAS	Azri Hassan
20		MAS	Ardillah Saifullah
21	GK	MAS	Hafizuddin Othman
23		MAS	Sufian Mat Ruslee
25		KOR	Jang Jong-hyun
27		MAS	Rashid Baharom
32	GK	MAS	Faiz Ahmad Sobri

== Honours ==
=== Malaysia Hockey League ===
- League

Winners (3): 2014, 2015, 2016

- Overall

Winners (4): 2014, 2015, 2016, 2017

== See also ==
- Malaysia Hockey League
- PenyuSukan.com - Artikel Berkaitan - TERENGGANU HOCKEY TEAM (THT)
