= Tenaga Nasional Berhad Hockey Club =

- Full name: Tenaga Nasional Berhad Hockey Club
- League: Malaysia Hockey League
- Founded: 8 July 1987; 39 years ago (previous name Kilat Club)
- Home ground: Tun Abdul Razak Stadium; Kuala Lumpur; Malaysia (Capacity 10,000)

Personnel
- Captain: (Malaysia) Mohd Sallehin Abdul Ghani
- Manager: (Malaysia) Samsul Ariffin Zainuddin
Home	Away

The Tenaga Nasional Berhad Hockey Club is a hockey club based in Kuala Lumpur, Malaysia. They are playing in top tier of the Malaysia Hockey League (MHL). The new home for this club is Tun Abdul Razak Stadium, Kuala Lumpur, Malaysia.

Tenaga Nasional Berhad is a successful club in Malaysia Hockey League, they won the league five times in 1990, 1991–1992 (as Kilat Club), 2000–2001, 2002 & 2003 (as TNB HC). The team is coached by Lailin Abu Hassan.

== History ==
- 1987-1992: Kilat Club
- 1992–present: Tenaga Nasional Berhad Hockey Club

== Players ==
=== Current squad ===
As of January 2020

No.	Pos.	Nation	Player
1		MAS	Syed Cholan
2		MAS	Najib Hassan
3	FW	MAS	Norsyafiq Sumantri
4		MAS	Ramadan Rosli
8		MAS	Syarman Mat Tee
9		MAS	Muhammad Mamat
10		MAS	Akhimullah Anuar Esook
12		MAS	Hakim Mohd Rodzi
13	FW	MAS	Muhajir Abdu
14		MAS	Amirol Arshad

No.	Pos.	Nation	Player
15	DF	MAS	Shello Silverius
16	GK	MAS	Kumar Subramaniam
18		MAS	Faiz Jali
19		MAS	Amirul Azahar
20		MAS	Syafie Ishak
23	FW	MAS	Azrai Abu Kamal
24	FW	MAS	Aiman Rozemi
29	GK	MAS	Hairi Rahman
30		MAS	Firdaus Rosdi

== Honours ==
=== Malaysia Hockey League ===
- League

Winners (5): 1990, 1991–92, 2000–01, 2002, 2003

== See also ==
- Malaysia Hockey League
