= Sapura Hockey Club =

Hockey club based in Kuala Lumpur, Malaysia

Sapura HC
- Full name: Sapura Hockey Club
- League: Malaysia Hockey League
- Founded: 1987; 39 years ago
- Home ground: National Hockey Stadium; Kuala Lumpur; Malaysia

Personnel
- Captain: (Malaysia)
- Manager: (Malaysia) Abdullah Yunus
Home	Away

The Sapura Hockey Club are the Malaysia Hockey League (MHL) team from Kuala Lumpur, Malaysia.

The best seasons for Sapura team were 2004 & 2005, both seasons they won the double.

== Players ==
=== First team ===
Note: Flags indicate national team as defined under FIFA eligibility rules; some limited exceptions apply. Players may hold more than one non-FIFA nationality.

No.	Pos.	Nation	Player
10	GK	MAS	Mohd Nasihin Nubli Ibrahim
1		MAS	Mohd Rodzhanizam Mat Radzi
2		MAS	Mohammad Noor Khairul Azrain Adnan
3		MAS	Vizayan Maniam
4		MAS	Muhammad Marhan Mohd Jalil
5		MAS	Ahmad Kazamirul Nasruddin
7	MF	MAS	Redzuan Ponirin
8	FW	MAS	Jiwa Mohan
11		MAS	Mohammad Faisal Kamarudin
12		MAS	Izwan Firdaus Ahmad Tajuddin

No.	Pos.	Nation	Player
13	MF	MAS	Joel Samuel Van Huizen
14	MF	MAS	Mohamad Razi Mohamad Ismail
15	DF	MAS	Jivan Mohan
16	FW	MAS	Azreen Rizal Nasir
18		MAS	Mohd Faizal Md Daud
19		MAS	Norhanfpe Omar
20		MAS	Muhammad Izzat Mohd Rahim
21		MAS	Craig Joseph Fernandez
22	DF	MAS	Kuhan Shanmuganathan
—		PAK	Muhd Imran
—		KOR	Lee Jung-Seon

=== Notable players ===
- (South Korea) Kang Keong-Wook - 2005
- (South Korea) Hwang Jong-Hyun - 2005
- (Pakistan) Rehan Butt - 2010
- (England) David James Kettle - 2010
- (South Korea) Lim Woo-Geun - 2010

== Club officials ==
=== Coaching and medical staff ===
- Manager: (Malaysia) Abdullah Yunus
- Chief coach: (Malaysia) I. Vikneswaran

=== Chief coach history ===
Season	Coach
2010–present	(Malaysia) I. Vikneswaran
2008–2009	(Malaysia) Stephen van Huizen
2007	(England) Gavin Featherstone

== Honours ==
- Malaysia Hockey League titles

Winners (2): 2004, 2005

- MHL-TNB Cup/Overall champions

Winners (2): 2005, 2006

- Tan Sri P. Alagendra Cup: 2016.

== See also ==
- Malaysia Hockey League
