= Kuala Lumpur Hockey Club =

Hockey club in Kuala Lumpur, Malaysia

- Full name: Kuala Lumpur Hockey Club
- League: Malaysia Hockey League
- Founded: 2000
- Home ground: Kuala Lumpur Hockey Stadium; Kuala Lumpur; Malaysia (Capacity 15,000)

Personnel
- Captain: (Malaysia) Sukri Mutalib
- Manager: (Malaysia) Ahmad Anuar Sham Kamar
Home	Away

The Kuala Lumpur Hockey Club or KLHC (formerly known as Arthur Andersen Hockey Club & Ernst & Young HC, after the previous owner and main sponsor), are the Malaysia Hockey League club from the city Kuala Lumpur, Malaysia. The team is led by Azlan Misron, a member of Malaysia national field hockey team.

Kuala Lumpur Hockey Club is a successful team in Malaysia Hockey League; they won league thrice in season 2006-2007, 2007–2008 and 2008-2009 (as Ernst & Young HC) and also thrice in year 2009-2010, 2010-2011 & 2011-2012 (as Kuala Lumpur Hockey Club). KLHC is the biggest club in the Malaysia Hockey League history in Malaysia country. This club also has represented Malaysia in the Asian hockey club competition, and many players from this club played at the World Cup and Olympic Games.

== History ==
- 2000–2001: Arthur Andersen Hockey Club
- 2001–2008: Ernst & Young Hockey Club
- 2009–present: Kuala Lumpur Hockey Club

== Players ==
=== Current squad ===
The squad which took part in the 2017 Malaysia Hockey League.

No.	Player	Pos.	Age
1	Muhamad Shafie	GK	21
2	Kleinschmidt Aaron Craig		28
3	Kevin Frederick Lim		31
4	Ahmad Kazamirul Nasruddin		29
5	Meor Muhamad Azuan Hasan		23
7	Muhammad Noor Faeez Ibrahim		26
8	Hammod Casey Dawsond		23
9	Muhammad Rashid Baharom		25
10	Mohd Syamim Mohd Yusof		25
11	Joel Samuel Van Huizen		25
12	Sukri Mutalib		31

No.	Player	Pos.	Age
13	Muhammad Haziq Samsul		23
14	Muhammad Umar Bhutta		25
15	Nabil Fiqri	MF	30
16	Roslan Jamaluddin	GK	39
17	Razie Rahim	DF	30
18	Muhammad Nur Asyraf Ishak		18
19	Muhammad Azri Hassan]		25
20	Harvinder Singh		28
21	Dedy Aryadi Jumaidi		26
22	Anton Poul Fritz Ebeling		26
30	Mohamad Izad Hakimi Jamaluddin		25

=== Former players ===
- (Pakistan) Ali Raza - 2005
- (Pakistan) Muhammad Sarwar - 2005

== Club officials ==
Position	Name
Manager	Ahmad Anuar Sham Kamar
Assistant Manager	Shanker Shanmugam
Coach	Harun Alrashid Samri
Assistant Coach	Harfizi Baharom
Physiotherapist	Rozana Abdul Raffar; Tommy Yeo

== Honours ==
=== Malaysia Hockey League ===
- League

Winners (9): 2005-06, 2006-07, 2007-08, 2008-09, 2009-10, 2010-11, 2011-12, 2013, 2017

=== Hockey Asian Champion Clubs Cup ===
- Cup

Winners (1): 2007-08
Runners Up (1): 2009-10
