= Men's field hockey Qualifying Tournaments for the 2012 Summer Olympics =

Qualifying Tournaments for the 2012 Summer Olympics
- Teams: (from 4 confederations)

The Men’s field hockey Qualifying Tournament for the 2012 Summer Olympics are qualification tournaments to determine the final three spots for the 2012 Summer Olympics. The qualifying tournaments, which involve 18 teams divided into three groups, with three separate qualifying tournaments, are to be held in India, Ireland and Japan, at different times in 2012. Only the winners of each qualifying tournament earn a berth in the 2012 Summer Olympics.

India qualified to Olympics after beating France 8–1 in first qualifying tournament, while South Korea qualified after beating Ireland 3–2 in the second qualifying tournament. South Africa qualified after they beat Japan 2-1 in the third qualifying tournament.

== Teams ==
Below is the list of 18 teams who participate in these qualifying tournaments:

Zone	Tournament	Qualifier(s)
Asia	2010 Asian Games	Malaysia; India; South Korea; China; Japan
Africa	2011 African Olympic Qualifier	~~Egypt~~^{1}
Americas	2011 Pan American Games	Canada; Chile; ~~Cuba~~^{2} ~~United States~~^{3}
Europe	2011 EuroHockey Nations Championship	Ireland; ~~Spain~~^{4} Russia; France
Europe	EuroHockey Nations Trophy	Poland; Ukraine; Austria; Czech Republic

^1 – Replaced by Italy
^2 – Replaced by Brazil
^3 – Replaced by Singapore
^4 – South Africa played in qualifying tournament, then gave up automatic berth which was given to Spain.

== Qualifying 1 ==
FIH Road to London – Delhi
Tournament details
- Host country: India
- City: New Delhi
- Dates: 18–26 February
- Teams: 6 (from 3 confederations)
- Venue(s): Dhyan Chand National Stadium

Final positions
- Champions: India
- Runner-up: France
- Third place: Canada

Tournament statistics
- Matches played: 18
- Goals scored: 139 (7.72 per match)
- Top scorer(s): (India) Sandeep Singh (16 goals)
- Best player: (India) Sardar Singh

Qualifying 1 was held from February 18 to February 25, 2012 in New Delhi, India.

=== Pool ===
Pos	Team	Pld	W	D	L	GF	GA	GD	Pts	Qualification
1	India (H)	5	5	0	0	36	8	+28	15	Final
2	France	5	3	1	1	17	8	+9	10	Final
3	Poland	5	3	0	2	24	13	+11	9	Third place game
4	Canada	5	2	1	2	29	8	+21	7	Third place game
5	Italy	5	1	0	4	7	27	−20	3	Fifth place game
6	Singapore	5	0	0	5	5	54	−49	0	Fifth place game

Source: FIH
(H) Hosts

18 February 2012
14:00

Canada	9–0	Italy
Jameson 13'; Guest 20', 56'; Short 34', 57'; Stewart 39'; Smythe 54'; Wright 60'; Tupper 65'	Report

Umpires:
John Wright (RSA)
Eduardo Lizana (ESP)

18 February 2012
16:00

France	2–1	Poland
H. Genestet 9'; Sevestre 39'	Report	Oszyjczyk 41'

Umpires:
Nigel Iggo (NZL)
Christian Blasch (GER)

18 February 2012
20:00

India	15–1	Singapore
Chandi 10', 21', 40'; Sardar 11'; Shivendra 18', 30'; Mujtaba 25', 52'; Khandker 42'; Sandeep 47'; Uthappa 48'; Walmiki 53'; Sowmarpet Vitalacharya 54', 57'; Lakra 70'	Report	Marican 39'

Umpires:
Colin Hutchinson (IRL)
Tim Pullman (AUS)

19 February 2012
12:00

Canada	2–3	Poland
Smythe 35'; Singh 54'	Report	Poltaszewski 18'; Mikula 33'; Rachwalski 70'

Umpires:
Christian Blasch (GER)
Eduardo Lizana (ESP)

19 February 2012
16:00

Singapore	0–9	France
	Report	M. Genestet 3', 30', 56', 58', 69'; Jean-Jean 14', 41'; Martin-Brisac 17'; Magner 32'

Umpires:
Tim Pullman (AUS)
Diego Estebanez (ESP)

19 February 2012
20:00

India	8–1	Italy
Sandeep 4', 22', 23'; Vokkaliga Ramachandra 12'; Vitalacharya 30', 38'; Chandi 32'; Shivendra 52'	Report	Nanni 17'

Umpires:
Nigel Iggo (NZL)
Roderick Wijsnuller (NED)

21 February 2012
14:00

Singapore	1–15	Canada
Chia Kai Bin 13'	Report	Wright 7'; Pearson 7', 35', 40', 52'; Short 11', 50', 69'; Tupper 19', 23', 29', 68'; Singh 31'; Hildreth 45'; Guest 57'

Umpires:
Bjorn Bachmann (GER)
Diego Estebanez (ESP)

21 February 2012
16:00

Poland	7–2	Italy
Juszczak 6', 34'; Hutek 7'; Oszyjczyk 16'; Majchrzak 52'; Gorny 65'; Mikula 66'	Report	Malta 13', 32'

Umpires:
Colin Hutchinson (IRL)
Roderick Wijsmuller (NED)

21 February 2012
20:00

France	2–6	India
Sevestre 35'; Magner 57'	Report	Shivendra 4'; Sandeep 9', 30', 37'; Sowmarpet Vitalacharya 39'; Khandker 62'

Umpires:
John Wright (RSA)
Christian Blasch (GER)

22 February 2012
12:00

Poland	11–3	Singapore
Oszyjczyk 9', 59', 63'; Nowakowski 24'; Juszczak 35'; Poltaszewski 40', 64'; Zywiczka 50'; Mikula 54'; Gorny 56'; Rataj 58'	Report	Kamsani 37', 49'; Jailani 70'

Umpires:
John Wright (RSA)
Roderick Wijsmuller (NED)

22 February 2012
16:00

Italy	0–3	France
	Report	Becuwe 43'; M. Genestet 52'; Verrier 57'

Umpires:
Tim Pullman (AUS)
Bjorn Bachmann (GER)

22 February 2012
20:00

Canada	2–3	India
Pearson 50'; Tupper 53'	Report	Shivendra 26'; Sandeep 40', 61'

Umpires:
Colin Hutchinson (IRL)
Nigel Iggo (NZL)

24 February 2012
12:00

Italy	4–0	Singapore
Salas 18'; Nunez 35', 52'; Melato 69'	Report

Umpires:
Nigel Iggo (NZL)
Colin Hutchinson (IRL)

24 February 2012
16:00

France	1 – 1	Canada
Magner 56'	Report	Smythe 35'

Umpires:
Bjorn Bachmann (GER)
Edurado Lizana (ESP)

24 February 2012
20:00

India	4–2	Poland
Sandeep 26', 70'; Shivendra 59'; Vokkaliga Ramachandra 65'	Report	Dutkiewicz 13'; Juszczak 63'

Umpires:
Tim Pullman (AUS)
Diego Estebanez (ESP)

=== Classification round ===
==== Fifth place game ====
26 February 2012
15:00

Italy	5–0	Singapore
Malta 28'; Corsi 33'; Nunez 42'; Salas 47', 58'	Report

Umpires:
Bjorn Bachmann (GER)
Diego Estebanez (ESP)

==== Third place game ====
26 February 2012
17:30

Poland	3–4	Canada
Mikula 9'; Oszyjczyk 28'; Zywiczka 52'	Report	Pereira 4', 51'; Short 27'; Guest 41'

Umpires:
Roderick Wijsmuller (NED)
Eduardo Lizana (ESP)

==== Final ====
26 February 2012
20:00

India	8–1	France
Lakra 17'; Sandeep 19', 26', 38', 49', 51'; Sowmarpet Vitalacharya 43'; Raghunath 56'	Report	Martin-Brisac 24'

Umpires:
John Wright (RSA)
Christian Blasch (GER)

=== Awards ===
- Best Player: (India) Sardar Singh
- Best Goalkeeper: (Poland) Mariusz Chyla
- Top Goalscorer: (India) Sandeep Singh (16 goals)
- Fair Play: India

=== Final standings ===
Pos	Team	Qualification
1	India (H)	2012 Summer Olympics
2	France	
3	Canada	
4	Poland	
5	Italy	
6	Singapore	

Source: FIH
(H) Host

== Qualifying 2 ==
FIH Road to London – Dublin
Tournament details
- Host country: Ireland
- City: Dublin
- Dates: 10–18 March
- Teams: 6 (from 3 confederations)
- Venue(s): National Hockey Stadium

Final positions
- Champions: South Korea
- Runner-up: Ireland
- Third place: Malaysia

Tournament statistics
- Matches played: 18
- Goals scored: 104 (5.78 per match)
- Top scorer(s): (Ireland) Timothy Cockram (Malaysia) Razie Rahim (South Korea) Lee Nam-Yong (6 goals)
- Best player: (South Korea) You Hyo-Sik

Qualifying 2 was held from March 10 to March 18, 2012 in Dublin, Ireland.

=== Pool ===
Pos	Team	Pld	W	D	L	GF	GA	GD	Pts	Qualification
1	South Korea	5	4	1	0	23	7	+16	13	Final
2	Ireland (H)	5	3	2	0	23	3	+20	11	Final
3	Malaysia	5	3	1	1	19	8	+11	10	Third place game
4	Russia	5	2	0	3	10	20	−10	6	Third place game
5	Chile	5	1	0	4	9	20	−11	3	Fifth place game
6	Ukraine	5	0	0	5	5	31	−26	0	Fifth place game

Source: FIH
(H) Hosts

10 March 2012
12:00

Malaysia	5–1	Chile
Abdul Rahim 16', 51'; Saari 37'; Hanafi 49'; Rahim 61'	Report	J. Richter 21'

Umpires:
Michael Eilmer (AUT)
German Oca De Montes (ARG)

10 March 2012
14:30

Ireland	6–1	Russia
Jermyn 15'; Cockram 16'; Darling 44'; Caruth 48'; Harte 56'; Watt 59'	Report	Zakirov 24'

Umpires:
Murray Grime (AUS)
Andrew Kennedy (GBR)

10 March 2012
17:00

South Korea	8–2	Ukraine
Jang Jong-Hyun 8', 35'; Lee Nam-Yong 12', 15', 69'; Nam Hyun-Woo 40', 41'; Cho Suk-Hoon 48'	Report	Ozerskyi 10'; Yasinskyi 64'

Umpires:
Deon Nel (RSA)
Richmond Attipoe (GHA)

11 March 2012
12:30

Malaysia	6–2	Russia
Rahim 27', 37', 54'; Saari 45'; Abdul Rahim 52'; Hanafi 65'	Report	Golubev 16', 17'

Umpires:
Gary Simmonds (RSA)
Richmond Attipoe (GHA)

11 March 2012
15:00

Ukraine	0–12	Ireland
	Report	Cockram 15', 29', 63'; Magee 21', 27'; Darling 35', 43'; Caruth 49'; Watt 54', 59'; Cargo 69'; Jermyn 70'

Umpires:
German Montes de Oca (ARG)
Javed Shaikh (IND)

11 March 2012
17:30

South Korea	6–1	Chile
Nam Hyun-Woo 31'; Lee Nam-Yong 35'; Yoon Sung-Hoon 43'; Cha Jong-Bok 54'; Kang Moon-Kweon 60', 61'	Report	S. Richter 62'

Umpires:
Martin Canniffe (IRL)
Gregory Uyttenhove (BEL)

13 March 2012
13:00

Ukraine	1–5	Malaysia
Paziuk 57'	Report	Tengku Abdul Jalil 26'; Hanafi 32'; Abdul Rahim 48'; Rahim 60'; Abdul Mutalib 69'

Umpires:
Gregory Uyttenhove (BEL)
Michael Eilmer (AUT)

13 March 2012
15:30

Russia	4–3	Chile
Platonov 16', 18'; Golubev 54'; Zhirkov 57'	Report	Gajardo 13'; J. Richter 46'; Berczely 48'

Umpires:
Deon Nel (RSA)
Javed Shaikh (IND)

13 March 2012
18:00

Ireland	1–1	South Korea
Ames 28'	Report	Nam Hyun-Woo 41'

Umpires:
Murray Grime (AUS)
Gary Simmonds (RSA)

15 March 2012
13:00

Russia	2–0	Ukraine
Loginov 32'; Platonov 66'	Report

Umpires:
German Montes de Oca (ARG)
Andrew Kennedy (GBR)

15 March 2012
15:30

Malaysia	2–3	South Korea
Hanafi 55'; Tengku Abdul Jalil 59'	Report	You Hyo-Sik 5', 43'; Jang Jong-Hyun 67'

Umpires:
Murray Grime (AUS)
Deon Nel (RSA)

15 March 2012
18:00

Chile	0–3	Ireland
	Report	Cockram 6'; Watt 43', 54'

Umpires:
Gregory Uyttenhove (BEL)
Javed Shaikh (IND)

17 March 2012
10:00

South Korea	5–1	Russia
You Hyo-Sik 9'; Jang Jong-Hyun 11', 50'; Jung Man-Jae 31'; Seo Jong-Ho 43'	Report	Yankun 57'

Umpires:
Michael Eilmer (AUT)
Javed Shaikh (IND)

17 March 2012
12:30

Chile	4–2	Ukraine
M. Rodríguez 2', 48'; Montegu 36'; Berzcely 60'	Report	Polishcuk 6', 24'

Umpires:
Richmond Attipoe (GHA)
Gregory Uyttenhove (BEL)

17 March 2012
15:00

Ireland	1–1	Malaysia
Jermyn 60'	Report	Mohd Noor 40'

Umpires:
Gary Simmonds (RSA)
Andrew Kennedy (GBR)

=== Classification round ===
==== Fifth place game ====
18 March 2012
11:00

Chile	1–2	Ukraine
Zirpel 37'	Report	Ozerskyi 29', 63'

Umpires:
Richmond Attipoe (GHA)
Deon Nel (RSA)

==== Third place game ====
18 March 2012
13:30

Malaysia	6–1	Russia
Misron 12'; Abd Rahim 16', 32'; Ahmad Tajuddin 46'; Hanafi 65'; Saari 68'	Report	Komarov 62'

Umpires:
German Montes de Oca (ARG)
Michael Eilmer (AUT)

==== Final ====
18 March 2012
16:00

South Korea	3–2	Ireland
Lee Nam-Yong 30', 70'; Nam Hyun-Woo 58'	Report	Caruth 14'; Cockram 56'

Umpires:
Murray Grime (AUS)
Gary Simmonds (RSA)

=== Awards ===
- Topscorer: (Malaysia) Razie Rahim, (Ireland) Timothy Cockram, (South Korea) Lee Nam-Yong (6 goals)
- Best Player: (South Korea) You Hyo-Sik

=== Final standings ===
Pos	Team	Qualification
1	South Korea	2012 Summer Olympics
2	Ireland (H)	
3	Malaysia	
4	Russia	
5	Ukraine	
6	Chile	

Source: FIH
(H) Host

== Qualifying 3 ==
Qualifying 3 was held from April 26 to May 6, 2012 in Kakamigahara, Japan.

=== Venue ===
- Gifu-ken Green Stadium

=== Pool ===
Team	Pld	W	D	L	GF	GA	GD	Pts
Japan	5	4	1	0	27	6	+21	13
South Africa	5	3	2	0	27	10	+17	11
China	5	3	0	2	14	8	+6	9
Austria	5	2	1	2	8	9	–1	7
Czech Republic	5	1	0	4	8	15	–7	3
Brazil	5	0	0	5	2	38	–36	0

26 April 2012
13:30

China	1 – 0	Austria
Na Yubo 15'	Report

Umpires:
David Gentles (AUS)
Gareth Greenfield (NZL)

26 April 2012
16:00

Japan	6 – 0	Czech Republic
Nagasawa 4', 23'; Sakamoto 26', 40', 60'; Kawakami 55'	Report

Umpires:
Simon Taylor (NZL)
Ged Curran (GBR)

26 April 2012
18:30

South Africa	11 – 1	Brazil
Norris-Jones 20', 70'; Cronje 24'; Drummond 29', 41'; Reid-Ross 35', 44', 45', 69'; Robinson 56'; McDade 64'	Report	Borges 40'

Umpires:
Adam Kearns (AUS)
Martin Madden (GBR)

28 April 2012
10:00

South Africa	6 – 2	Czech Republic
Reid-Ross 4', 55'; Drummond 7'; Norris-Jones 28'; Louw 29'; McDade 70'	Report	Seemann 14'; Bernatek 40'

Umpires:
Kim Hong-Lae (KOR)
Martin Madden (GBR)

28 April 2012
12:30

Brazil	0 – 8	China
	Report	Liu Yixian 4', 67', 69'; Song Yixian 6'; Sun Long 21'; Liu Xiantang 32'; Na Yubo 44'; Dong Yang 55'

Umpires:
Gareth Greenfield (NZL)
Marcin Grochal (POL)

28 April 2012
15:00

Japan	4 – 1	Austria
Nagasawa 4'; Tachibana 23'; Sakamoto 40'; Fukushiro 64'	Report	Körper 56'

Umpires:
Simon Taylor (NZL)
Raghu Prasad (IND)

30 April 2012
13:30

Austria	2 – 1	Czech Republic
Körper 9', 26'	Report	Nicklas 11'

Umpires:
David Gentles (AUS)
Marcin Grochal (POL)

30 April 2012
16:00

Brazil	0 – 11	Japan
	Report	Shiokawa 1'; Sakamoto 11', 63'; Tanaka 13', 14', 69'; Kayukawa 20'; Mizawa 35'; Nagasawa 38', 70+'; Fukushiro 49'

Umpires:
Kim Hong-Lae (KOR)
Raghu Prasad (IND)

30 April 2012
18:30

China	2 – 5	South Africa
Na Yubo 47'; Liu Yixian 69'	Report	Reid-Ross 17'; Haley 20'; Norris-Jones 31'; Robinson 46', 50'

Umpires:
Adam Kearns (AUS)
Ged Curran (GBR)

2 May 2012
13:30

Austria	3 – 1	Brazil
Körper 3', 30', 56'	Report	Borges 35+'

Umpires:
Gareth Greenfield (NZL)
Ged Curran (GBR)

2 May 2012
16:00

Japan	3 – 3	South Africa
Kawakami 25'; Nagasawa 42'; Tanaka 53'	Report	Norris-Jones 29'; Reid-Ross 45', 70+'

Umpires:
David Gentles (AUS)
Simon Taylor (NZL)

2 May 2012
18:30

Czech Republic	0 – 1	China
	Report	Na Yubo 47'

Umpires:
Marcin Grochal (POL)
Martin Madden (GBR)

4 May 2012
13:30

Czech Republic	5 – 0	Brazil
Bernatek 7'; Bures 10'; Prochazka 27'; Seemann 42'; Vacek 62'	Report

Umpires:
Simon Taylor (NZL)
Raghu Prasad (IND)

4 May 2012
16:00

China	2 – 3	Japan
Na Yubo 10', 30'	Report	Kayukawa 26'; Nagasawa 57'; Kitazato 70'

Umpires:
Kim Hong-Lae (KOR)
Marcin Grochal (POL)

4 May 2012
18:30

South Africa	2 – 2	Austria
Smith 49', 65'	Report	Körper 20'; Jeliner 56'

Umpires:
Gareth Greenfield (NZL)
Adam Kearns (AUS)

=== Classification ===
==== Fifth and sixth ====
6 May 2012
10:00

Czech Republic	5 – 1	Brazil
Prochazka 4', 9'; Bernatek 28', 56'; Seemann 66'	Report	Pacheco 36'

Umpires:
Kim Hong-Lae (KOR)
Adam Kearns (AUS)

==== Third and fourth ====
6 May 2012
12:30

China	5 – 3	Austria
Liu Xiantang 9'; Song Yixian 15', 42'; Na Yubo 31', 61'	Report	Schmidt 19', 53'; Stremitzer 45'

Umpires:
Raghu Prasad (IND)
Martin Madden (GBR)

==== Final ====
6 May 2012
15:00

Japan	1 – 2	South Africa
Kitazato 64'	Report	McDade 44'; Norris-Jones 54'

Umpires:
David Gentles (AUS)
Ged Curran (GBR)

=== Awards ===
- Topscorer: (South Africa) Justin Reid-Ross
- Best Player: (China) Na Yubo
- Best Goalkeeper: (Japan) Shunsuke Nagaoka
- Fair Play: Brazil
