= 2006 Men's Intercontinental Cup (field hockey) =

Field hockey tournament

Tournament details
- Host country: China
- City: Changzhou
- Dates: 12–23 April
- Teams: 12 (from 5 confederations)
- Venue: Wu Jin Sports Complex Hockey Stadium

Final positions
- Champions: New Zealand (1st title)
- Runner-up: South Korea
- Third place: England

Tournament statistics
- Matches played: 42
- Goals scored: 173 (4.12 per match)
- Top scorer: (England) Richard Mantell (10 goals)

The 2006 Men's Intercontinental Cup was a qualifier for the 2006 Men's Hockey World Cup. It was held between 12 and 23 April 2006 in Changzhou, China. New Zealand won the tournament after defeating Korea 4–1 in the final. Alongside England, Pakistan and Japan, these five teams qualified for the World Cup.

== Qualification ==
All five confederations received quotas for teams to participate allocated by the International Hockey Federation based upon the FIH World Rankings. Those teams participated at their respective continental championships but could not qualify through it, and they received the chance to qualify through this tournament based on the final ranking at each competition.

Dates	Event	Location	Qualifier(s)
21–28 September 2003	2003 Asia Cup	Kuala Lumpur, Malaysia	Pakistan; South Korea; Japan; Malaysia; China
12–23 May 2004	2004 Pan American Cup	London, Canada	Canada
28 August–4 September 2005	2005 EuroHockey Championship	Leipzig, Germany	Belgium; France; England
11–17 September 2005	2005 EuroHockey Nations Trophy	Rome, Italy	Ireland
1–8 October 2005	2005 African Cup for Nations	Pretoria, South Africa	Egypt
15–19 November 2005	2005 Oceania Cup	Suva, Fiji	New Zealand

== Umpires ==
Below are the 14 umpires appointed by the International Hockey Federation:

- Christian Blasch (GER)
- Chen Dekang (CHN)
- Henrik Ehlers (DEN)
- Faiz Muhammad Faizi (PAK)
- Murray Grime (AUS)
- Nigel Iggo (NZL)
- Kim Hong-lae (KOR)
- Andy Mair (SCO)
- Raghu Prasad (IND)
- Sumesh Putra (CAN)
- Amarjit Singh (MAS)
- Pedro Teixeira da Silva (POR)
- Rob ten Cate (NED)
- John Wright (RSA)

== Results ==
All times are China Standard Time (UTC+08:00)

=== Pool A ===
Pos	Team	Pld	W	D	L	GF	GA	GD	Pts	Qualification
1	England	5	4	0	1	19	8	+11	12	Semi-finals
2	Pakistan	5	3	2	0	10	7	+3	11	Semi-finals
3	Belgium	5	3	1	1	9	5	+4	10	
4	Ireland	5	1	1	3	7	12	−5	4	
5	Canada	5	1	0	4	6	10	−4	3	
6	Egypt	5	1	0	4	8	17	−9	3	

Source: Todor66

12 April 2006
10:00

Pakistan	1–0	Canada
Abbasi 17'	Report

Umpires:
Amarjit Singh (MAS)
Rob ten Cate (NED)

12 April 2006
12:00

Belgium	5–2	Egypt
Brulé 4', 33'; Vandeweghe 53'; Truyens 56'; Goldberg 66'	Report	Mohamed 19', 34'

Umpires:
John Wright (RSA)
Chen Dekang (CHN)

12 April 2006
18:00

England	5–1	Ireland
R. Mantell 23', 29', 54', 59'; Hawes 49'	Report	Jermyn 25'

Umpires:
Nigel Iggo (NZL)
Henrik Ehlers (DEN)

13 April 2006
14:00

Pakistan	2–2	Belgium
Zakir 50'; Saqlain 59'	Report	Brulé 62'; Truyens 70'

Umpires:
Henrik Ehlers (DEN)
Kim Hong-lae (KOR)

13 April 2006
16:00

Egypt	1–6	England
Mohamed 56'	Report	S. Mantell 4'; Tindall 5'; R. Mantell 9', 63'; Clarke 28'; Alexander 39'

Umpires:
Faiz Muhammad Faizi (PAK)
Christian Blasch (GER)

13 April 2006
18:00

Ireland	2–1	Canada
Butler 34'; Gleghorne 41'	Report	Lee 39'

Umpires:
Pedro Teixeira da Silva (POR)
Murray Grime (AUS)

15 April 2006
12:00

Canada	3–5	England
Lee 28'; Short 33'; Pereira 55'	Report	R. Mantell 15', 21'; Tindall 41', 43'; Clarke 46'

Umpires:
Kim Hong-lae (KOR)
Raghu Prasad (IND)

15 April 2006
14:00

Belgium	1–0	Ireland
Luycx 9'	Report

Umpires:
Nigel Iggo (NZL)
Andy Mair (SCO)

15 April 2006
16:00

Egypt	1–2	Pakistan
Mohamed 32'	Report	Khan 45'; Warsi 60'

Umpires:
Chen Dekang (CHN)
Henrik Ehlers (DEN)

17 April 2006
14:00

Ireland	2–3	Egypt
Jermyn 22'; Burns 38'	Report	Mohamed 35', 69'; H. Mohamed 63'

Umpires:
Murray Grime (AUS)
Amarjit Singh (MAS)

17 April 2006
16:00

Canada	0–1	Belgium
	Report	Truyens 2'

Umpires:
Kim Hong-lae (KOR)
Chen dekang (CHN)

17 April 2006
18:00

England	2–3	Pakistan
R. Mantell 20'; S. Mantell 50'	Report	Khan 24'; Butt 26'; Saqlain 60'

Umpires:
John Wright (RSA)
Iggo Nigel (NZL)

19 April 2006
10:00

Belgium	0–1	England
	Report	Daly 4'

Umpires:
Rob ten Cate (NED)
John Wright (RSA)

19 April 2006
12:00

Pakistan	2–2	Ireland
Hussain 10'; Butt 42'	Report	Butler 21', 32'

Umpires:
Christian Blasch (GER)
Amarjit Singh (MAS)

19 April 2006
14:00

Egypt	1–2	Canada
H. Mohamed 46'	Report	Grimes 14'; Short 28'

Umpires:
Pedro Teixeira da Silva (POR)
Kim Hong-lae (KOR)

=== Pool B ===
Pos	Team	Pld	W	D	L	GF	GA	GD	Pts	Qualification
1	South Korea	5	3	2	0	12	6	+6	11	Semi-finals
2	New Zealand	5	3	1	1	15	11	+4	10	Semi-finals
3	Japan	5	3	0	2	14	13	+1	9	
4	France	5	2	2	1	17	13	+4	8	
5	Malaysia	5	1	0	4	6	12	−6	3	
6	China (H)	5	0	1	4	6	15	−9	1	

Source: Todor66
(H) Hosts

12 April 2006
14:00

South Korea	2–2	France
Jang Jong-hyun 5'; You Hyo-sik 31'	Report	Boyer 23'; Soyez 63'

Umpires:
Sumesh Putra (CAN)
Pedro Teixeira da Silva (POR)

12 April 2006
16:00

China	1–4	New Zealand
Liu Xiantang 69'	Report	Burrows 3', 29'; Child 26'; Collier 34'

Umpires:
Raghu Prasad (IND)
Christian Blasch (GER)

12 April 2006
20:00

Malaysia	0–1	Japan
	Report	Yamabori 53'

Umpires:
Andy Mair (SCO)
Murray Grime (AUS)

14 April 2006
14:00

New Zealand	4–2	Japan
Smith 8'; Hari 30'; Archibald 43'; Burrows 47'	Report	Yamabori 53'; Sakamoto 56'

Umpires:
Amarjit Singh (MAS)
Sumesh Putra (CAN)

14 April 2006
16:00

South Korea	3–1	Malaysia
Jang Jong-hyun 9'; You Hyo-sik 10'; Lee Nam-yong 63'	Report	Chua Boon Huat 52'

Umpires:
Rob ten Cate (NED)
John Wright (RSA)

14 April 2006
18:00

France	3–3	China
Durchon 12'; Soyez 52'; Branquart 68'	Report	Yu Yang 7'; Song Yi 25'; Na Yubo 58'

Umpires:
Andy Mair (SCO)
Faiz Muhammad Faizi (PAK)

16 April 2006
12:00

Japan	2–4	South Korea
Yamabori 24'; Tobita 47'	Report	Jang Jong-hyun 3'; Kang Seong-jung 7'; Lee Sung-min 22'; Seo Jong-ho 40'

Umpires:
Pedro Teixeira da Silva (POR)
Christian Blasch (GER)

16 April 2006
14:00

China	0–2	Malaysia
	Report	Tengku 47'; Ismail 60'

Umpires:
Murray Grime (AUS)
Sumesh Putra (CAN)

16 April 2006
16:00

New Zealand	2–5	France
Stephenson 15'; Shaw 24'	Report	Jean-Jean 4'; Boyer 5', 35'; Soyez 29'; Gaillard 67'

Umpires:
Rob ten Cate (NED)
Raghu Prasad (IND)

18 April 2006
14:00

Malaysia	1–4	France
Ismail 25'	Report	Gaillard 15'; Boyer 24'; Soyez 51'; Jean-Jean 57'

Umpires:
Faiz Muhammad Faizi (PAK)
Andy Mair (SCO)

18 April 2006
16:00

Japan	4–2	China
Katayama 33'; Ito 44'; Sakamoto 47'; Anai 54'	Report	Na Yubo 41'; Yu Yang 67'

Umpires:
Henrik Ehlers (DEN)
Rob ten Cate (NED)

18 April 2006
18:00

South Korea	1–1	New Zealand
Seo Jong-ho 40'	Report	Burrows 69'

Umpires:
Chen Dekang (CHN)
Christian Blasch (GER)

19 April 2006
16:00

France	3–5	Japan
Gouedard-Comte 11'; Gaillard 24', 27'	Report	Katayama 8'; Yamabori 21'; Ito 41'; Tsubouchi 52'; Bito 69'

Umpires:
Murray Grime (AUS)
Nigel Iggo (NZL)

19 April 2006
18:00

New Zealand	4–2	Malaysia
Stephenson 17'; Child 35'; Shaw 39'; Hari 65'	Report	Tengku 13'; Kuhan 48'

Umpires:
Henrik Ehlers (DEN)
Andy Mair (SCO)

19 April 2006
20:00

China	0–2	South Korea
	Report	Jang Jong-hyun 15'; Hong Sung-kweon 65'

Umpires:
Sumesh Putra (CAN)
Raghu Prasad (IND)

=== Ninth to twelfth place classification ===
Crossover
21 April
Canada	1
China	0
21 April
Malaysia	6
Egypt	2

Ninth place
22 April
Canada	1
Malaysia	2
Eleventh place
22 April
China	2
Egypt (a.e.t.)	3

==== Crossover ====
21 April 2006
09:00

Canada	1–0	China
Fernandes 59'	Report

Umpires:
Faiz Muhammad Faizi (PAK)
Raghu Prasad (IND)

21 April 2006
09:30

Malaysia	6–2	Egypt
Amin 31', 38', 60'; Ismail 43'; Logan Raj 47'; Rodzhanizam 51'	Report	El Sayed 41'; Abdel Aziz 53'

Umpires:
Pedro Teixeira da Silva (POR)
Chen Dekang (CHN)

==== Eleventh and twelfth place ====
22 April 2006
12:00

China	2–3 (a.e.t.)	Egypt
Li Wei 29'; Na Yubo 52'	Report	El Sayed 10'; Mohamed 12', 82'

Umpires:
Kim Hong-lae (KOR)
Faiz Muhammad Faizi (PAK)

==== Ninth and tenth place ====
22 April 2006
14:30

Canada	1–2	Malaysia
Jameson 46'	Report	Amin 3'; Tengku 20'

Umpires:
Chen Dekang (CHN)
Raghu Prasad (IND)

=== Fifth to eighth place classification ===
Crossover
21 April
Belgium	1 (2)
France (p.s.)	1 (4)
21 April
Japan	2
Ireland	1

Fifth place
23 April
France	1
Japan	2
Seventh place
22 April
Belgium	2
Ireland	1

==== Crossover ====
21 April 2006
11:30

Belgium	1–1 (a.e.t.)	France
Luycx 7'	Report	Durchon 23'
Penalties
Goldberg (penalty shoot-out scored); Truyens (penalty shoot-out missed); Luycx (penalty shoot-out scored); Vandeweghe (penalty shoot-out missed)	2–4	(penalty shoot-out scored) C. Musgens; (penalty shoot-out scored) N. Musgens; (penalty shoot-out scored) Gaillard; (penalty shoot-out scored) Soyez

Umpires:
Christian Blasch (GER)
Henrik Ehlers (DEN)

21 April 2006
14:00

Japan	2–1	Ireland
Yamabori 13'; Ito 59'	Report	Jermyn 34'

Umpires:
John Wright (USA)
Murray Grime (AUS)

==== Seventh and eighth place ====
22 April 2006
17:00

Belgium	2–1	Ireland
Brulé 18' van Hove 48'	Report	Cockram 70'

Umpires:
John Wright (RSA)
Nigel Iggo (NZL)

==== Fifth and sixth place ====
23 April 2006
12:30

France	1–2	Japan
Raisin 43'	Report	Ozawa 27', 57'

Umpires:
Henrik Ehlers (DEN)
Murray Grime (AUS)

=== First to fourth place classification ===
Semi-finals
21 April
England	1
New Zealand	3
21 April
South Korea	2
Pakistan	1

Final
23 April
New Zealand	4
South Korea	1
Third place
23 April
England	3
Pakistan	1

==== Semi-finals ====
22 April 2006
09:30

England	1–3	New Zealand
Tindall 45'	Report	Child 9', 27'; Shaw 58'

Umpires:
Amarjit Singh (MAS)
Sumesh Putra (CAN)

22 April 2006
12:00

South Korea	2–1	Pakistan
Hong Eun-seong 47'; Lee Nam-yong 50'	Report	Imran 58'

Umpires:
Andy Mair (SCO)
Rob ten Cate (NED)

==== Third and fourth place ====
23 April 2006
10:00

England	3–1	Pakistan
Tindall 34'; S. Mantell 47'; R. Mantell 65'	Report	Khan 49'

Umpires:
John Wright (RSA)
Nigel Iggo (NZL)

==== Final ====
23 April 2006
15:00

New Zealand	4–1	South Korea
Stephenson 17', 35'; Child 24'; Hari 70'	Report	Kang Seong-jung 57'

Umpires:
Christian Blasch (GER)
Andy Mair (SCO)

== Final standings ==
Pos	Team	Qualification
1	New Zealand	2006 World Cup
2	South Korea	2006 World Cup
3	England	2006 World Cup
4	Pakistan	2006 World Cup
5	Japan	2006 World Cup
6	France	
7	Belgium	
8	Ireland	
9	Malaysia	
10	Canada	
11	Egypt	
12	China (H)	

Source: Todor66
(H) Host

== See also ==
- 2006 Women's Intercontinental Cup
