= 2010 Sultan Azlan Shah Cup =

Field hockey tournament

Tournament details
- Host country: Malaysia
- City: Ipoh
- Teams: 7
- Venue: Azlan Shah Stadium

Final positions
- Champions: India (5th title) and South Korea (2nd title)
- Third place: Australia

Tournament statistics
- Matches played: 24
- Goals scored: 128 (5.33 per match)
- Top scorer: (South Korea) Nam Hyun-Woo (9 goals)
- Best player: (India) Sardar Singh

The 2010 Sultan Azlan Shah Cup was the 19th edition of the Sultan Azlan Shah Cup, a field hockey tournament held between 6–16 May 2010. Due to bad weather, the final between India and Korea was abandoned after 6 minutes and 14 seconds of play. After discussions and consultations between the Tournament Director Paul Richards, the Organising Committee, with the consent of Sultan Azlan Shah, decided that India and Korea would be joint champions for the 19th edition of the Sultan Azlan Shah Cup. It was the 5th title for India and the 2nd for Korea.

== Participating nations ==
Seven countries participated in this year's tournament:

- Australia
- India
- South Korea
- Malaysia
- China
- Pakistan
- Egypt

== Results ==
All times are Malaysia Standard Time (UTC+08:00)

=== First round ===
==== Pool stage ====
Pos	Team	Pld	W	D	L	GF	GA	GD	Pts	Qualification
1	India	6	4	1	1	21	14	+7	13	Final
2	South Korea	6	3	2	1	20	11	+9	11	Final
3	Australia	6	3	2	1	20	12	+8	11	Third place game
4	Malaysia (H)	6	3	2	1	17	9	+8	11	Third place game
5	Pakistan	6	2	2	2	24	20	+4	8	Fifth place game
6	China	6	1	1	4	12	19	−7	4	Fifth place game
7	Egypt	6	0	0	6	4	33	−29	0	

Source: azlanshahcup
(H) Hosts

6 May 2010
16:05 MST

South Korea	6–0	Egypt
Nam Hyun-woo 6', 28', 60'; Kim Young-jin 12'; Lee Nam-young 35'; You Hyo-sik 39'

6 May 2010
18:05 MST

China	1–1	India
Sun T. 13'		Ravi 69'

6 May 2010
20:05 MST

Malaysia	3–3	Pakistan
Hafiz 19', 51'; Amin 50'		Rasool 4'; Irfan 56'; Zubair 70'

7 May 2010
16:05 MST

Australia	4–0	Egypt
Schubert 18'; Ciriello 49'; Gohdes 59'; Govers 64'

7 May 2010
18:05 MST

India	4–2	Pakistan
Sardar 26'; Antil 47'; Gurbaj 53'; Khandekar 56'		Imran 37'; Ali 66'

7 May 2010
20:05 MST

Malaysia	1–1	South Korea
Azlan 51'		Oh Dae-keun 13'

9 May 2010
16:05 MST

India	3–2	South Korea
Halappa 10'; Khandekar 55'; Shivendra 60'		Nam Hyun-woo 13', 70'

9 May 2010
18:05 MST

Pakistan	6–2	China
Imran 17'; Khan 30', 42'; Zubair 45', 47'; Rizwan Sr. 61'		Yu 18'; Sun L. 40'

9 May 2010
20:05 MST

Malaysia	1–2	Australia
Azlan 5'		Ciriello 2'; Gohdes 59'

10 May 2010
16:05 MST

South Korea	5–3	China
Cho Suk-hoon 25'; Nam Hyun-woo 29'; You Hyo-sik 32'; Yoon Sung-hoon 39'; Lee Seung-il 46'		Sun L. 3'; Yu 37'; Meng 59'

10 May 2010
18:05 MST

India	4–3	Australia
Khandekar 19', 33'; Rajpal 21'; Shivendra 61'		Mitton 38'; Ciriello 40'; Paterson 69'

10 May 2010
20:05 MST

Malaysia	5–0	Egypt
Azlan 24', 41'; Faizal 33'; Amin 40'; Tengku 56'

12 May 2010
16:05 MST

Australia	5–5	Pakistan
Bates 11'; Schubert 17', 61'; Ciriello 26', 40'		Rizwan Sr. 21'; Irfan 53'; Imran 58', 69'; Umar 64'

12 May 2010
18:05 MST

China	5–1	Egypt
Liu 15'; Cui 23'; Na 35'; Sun L. 41'; Luo 43'		Gobran 12'

12 May 2010
20:05 MST

Malaysia	5–2	India
Amin 27', 48'; Tengku 39'; Razie 41'; Rizal 60'		Mujtaba 44'; Ravi 68'

13 May 2010
16:05 MST

Pakistan	6–2	Egypt
Mossen 12'; Zubair 19'; Imran 29'; Khan 40', 52'; Waqas 42'		Hassan 51', 70'

13 May 2010
18:05 MST

Australia	2–2	South Korea
Govers 5'; Gohdes 46'		Nam Hyun-woo 25'; Ro Jong-hwan 58'

13 May 2010
20:05 MST

Malaysia	2–1	China
Amin 37'; Azlan 61'		Liu 56'

15 May 2010
16:05 MST

Australia	4–0	China
Govers 3', 21'; Ciriello 50'; Schubert 51'

15 May 2010
18:05 MST

South Korea	4–2	Pakistan
Lee Nam-yong 38', 46'; Nam Hyun-woo 66', 68'		Zubair 32'; Imran 57'

15 May 2010
20:05 MST

India	7–1	Egypt
Mahadik 34', 40', 42'; Rajpal 44'; Rupinder Pal 48'; Khandekar 49'; Sarvanjit 70'		El Hakim 68'

=== Second round ===
==== Classification matches ====
===== Fifth and sixth place =====
16 May 2010
15:35 MST

Pakistan	1–1	China
Rasool 43'		Na 24'
Penalties
	6–5

===== Third and fourth place =====
16 May 2010
18:05 MST

Australia	5–3	Malaysia
Swann 34'; Ford 43'; Govers 50'; Ciriello 55'; Schubert 65'		Hafiz 14'; Amin 48'; Tengku 70'

===== Final =====
16 May 2010
20:35 MST

India	0–0	South Korea

Match abandoned after 6 minutes and 14 seconds due to bad weather, both teams declared joint winners.

== Awards ==
XI Team of the Tournament

Goalkeepers	Defenders	Midfielders	Forwards
(Malaysia) Kumar Subramaniam	(India) Sardar Singh	(Malaysia) Baljit Singh	(Malaysia) Tengku Ahmad Tajuddin
	(India) Gurbaj Singh	(South Korea) Hong Eun-seong	(South Korea) You Hyo-sik
	(South Korea) Lee Nam-yong	(India) Arjun Halappa	(Australia) Kieran Govers
	(Pakistan) Muhammad Imran

Champions

- India
- South Korea

Fairplay

- Egypt

Player of the Tournament

- (India) Sardar Singh

Goalkeeper of the Tournament

- (Malaysia) Kumar Subramaniam

Top Scorer

- (South Korea) Nam Hyun-woo (9 goals)

== Scorers ==
9 goals

- (South Korea) Nam Hyun Woo

7 goals

- (Australia) Christopher Ciriello

6 goals

- (Malaysia) Amin Rahim
- (Pakistan) Muhammad Imran

5 goals

- (Malaysia) Azlan Misron
- (Pakistan) Muhammad Zubair
- (India) Tushar Khandekar
- (Australia) Grant Schubert
- (Australia) Kieran Govers

4 goals

- (Pakistan) Abdul Haseem Khan

3 goals

- (Malaysia) Haffihafiz Hanafi
- (Malaysia) Tengku Ahmad Tajudin
- (India) Dhananjay Mahadik
- (Australia) Matt Gohdes
- (China) Sun Long
- (South Korea) Lee Nam Yong

2 goals

- (India) Rajpal Singh
- (India) Paul Ravi
- (India) Shivendra Singh
- (South Korea) You Hyo Sik
- (Pakistan) Muhammad Irfan
- (Pakistan) Muhammad Rizwan
- (Pakistan) Shafqat Rasool
- (China) Yu Yang
- (China) Liu Yixian
- (China) Na Yubo
- (Egypt) Muhamed Hassan

1 goal

- (Malaysia) Faizal Saari
- (Malaysia) Razie Rahim
- (Malaysia) Rizal Nasir
- (India) Arjun Halappa
- (India) Sardar Singh
- (India) Mandip Antil
- (India) Gurbaj Singh
- (India) Mujtaba Danish
- (India) Rupinder Pal Singh
- (India) Sarvanjit Singh
- (Australia) Timothy Bates
- (Australia) Trent Mitton
- (Australia) Matthew Swann
- (Australia) Russell Ford
- (South Korea) Lee Seung Il
- (South Korea) Cho Suk Hoon
- (South Korea) Yong Sung Hoon
- (South Korea) Oh Dae Keun
- (South Korea) Kim Young Jin
- (South Korea) Ro Jong Hwan
- (Pakistan) Muhammad Umar
- (Pakistan) Kashif Ali
- (Pakistan) Ahmed Mossen
- (Pakistan) Muhammad Waqas
- (China) Cui Yongxin
- (China) Luo Fangming
- (China) Sun Tianjun
- (China) Meng Jun
- (Egypt) Hossam Gobran
- (Egypt) Ahmed El Hakim

== Final ranking ==
- This ranking does not reflect the actual performance of the team as the ranking issued by the International Hockey Federation. This is just a benchmark ranking in the Sultan Azlan Shah Cup only.

Position	Team
1	India and South Korea
2	-
3	Australia
4	Malaysia
5	Pakistan
6	China
7	Egypt
