= 2009 Men's Hockey Champions Challenge I =

Field hockey tournament

Tournament details
- Host country: Argentina
- City: Salta
- Dates: 6–13 December
- Teams: 8

Final positions
- Champions: New Zealand (1st title)
- Runner-up: Pakistan
- Third place: India

Tournament statistics
- Matches played: 20
- Goals scored: 104 (5.2 per match)
- Top scorer: (Argentina) Pedro Ibarra (8 goals)
- Best player: (India) Sardar Singh

The 2009 Men's Hockey Champions Challenge was held from December 6 to December 13, 2009, in Salta, Argentina. The competitors were 8 teams ranked from 7th to 15th in the world.

This was the fifth edition of the tournament created by the International Hockey Federation in 2001 to broaden hockey's competitive base globally and featured the 8 teams just behind the top six teams in the world.

New Zealand defeated Pakistan to take the title, and qualify for the Champions Trophy tournament in 2010 in Mönchengladbach, Germany.

== Preliminary round ==
All times are Argentina Time (UTC−04:00)

=== Pool A ===
| Pos | Team | Pld | W | D | L | GF | GA | GD | Pts | Qualification |
|---|---|---|---|---|---|---|---|---|---|---|
| 1 | India | 3 | 2 | 1 | 0 | 10 | 5 | +5 | 7 | Advanced to Semi-finals |
| 2 | New Zealand | 3 | 1 | 2 | 0 | 8 | 5 | +3 | 5 | Advanced to Semi-finals |
| 3 | Belgium | 3 | 1 | 0 | 2 | 7 | 11 | −4 | 3 | |
| 4 | China | 3 | 0 | 1 | 2 | 6 | 10 | −4 | 1 | |

Source: FIH
Rules for classification: 1) points; 2) goal difference; 3) goals scored; 4) head-to-head result.

6 December 2009
14:05

| Belgium | 4–3 | China |
|---|---|---|
| Pangrazio 10', 65'; Thys 42'; Gougnard 53' | Report | Na 14'; Hu 38'; Song 43' |

Umpires:
Roel van Eert (NED)
Deon Nel (RSA)

6 December 2009
16:05

| New Zealand | 2–2 | India |
|---|---|---|
| Couzins 47'; Hayward 58' | Report | Khandker 30'; Shivendra 51' |

Umpires:
Henrik Ehlers (DEN)
German Montes de Oca (ARG)

8 December 2009
12:05

| India | 4–1 | China |
|---|---|---|
| Prabhjot 7'; Rajpal 35'; Sarwanjit 56'; Shivendra 70' | Report | Song 41' |

Umpires:
Francisco Vazquez (ESP)
Daniel Lopez Ramos (URU)

8 December 2009
14:05

| Belgium | 1–4 | New Zealand |
|---|---|---|
| Charlier 30' | Report | Couzins 25'; Archibald 49'; Child 64'; Inglis 65' |

Umpires:
Roel van Eert (NED)
Haider Rasool (PAK)

10 December 2009
14:05

| New Zealand | 2–2 | China |
|---|---|---|
| Wilson 42'; Inglis 44' | Report | Liu X. 4'; Liu Y. 57' |

Umpires:
Nathan Stagno (GIB)
Thomas Dumon (BEL)

10 December 2009
16:05

| India | 4–2 | Belgium |
|---|---|---|
| Mahadik 19'; Shivendra 30'; Khandker 48'; Prabhjot 70' | Report | Dekeyser 24'; Pangrazio 25' |

Umpires:
German Montes de Oca (ARG)
Diego Barbas (ARG)

=== Pool B ===
| Pos | Team | Pld | W | D | L | GF | GA | GD | Pts | Qualification |
|---|---|---|---|---|---|---|---|---|---|---|
| 1 | Argentina (H) | 3 | 2 | 0 | 1 | 11 | 6 | +5 | 6 | Advanced to Semi-finals |
| 2 | Pakistan | 3 | 2 | 0 | 1 | 7 | 5 | +2 | 6 | Advanced to Semi-finals |
| 3 | Canada | 3 | 1 | 0 | 2 | 5 | 8 | −3 | 3 | |
| 4 | South Africa | 3 | 1 | 0 | 2 | 7 | 11 | −4 | 3 | |

Source: FIH
Rules for classification: 1) points; 2) goal difference; 3) goals scored; 4) head-to-head result.
(H) Hosts

6 December 2009
12:05

| Pakistan | 2–1 | Canada |
|---|---|---|
| Abbas 14', 31' | Report | Fernandes 47' |

Umpires:
Francisco Vazquez (ESP)
Thomas Dumon (BEL)

6 December 2009
18:05

| Argentina | 6–2 | South Africa |
|---|---|---|
| Ibarra 9', 12', 31'; Mazzilli 24'; L. Vila 53', 55' | Report | Harper 15'; Norris-Jones 69' |

Umpires:
Haider Rasool (PAK)
Nathan Stagno (GIB)

8 December 2009
16:05

| Canada | 1–4 | South Africa |
|---|---|---|
| Tupper 59' | Report | Paton 30'; Haley 41'; Reid-Ross 46'; Carr 65' |

Umpires:
Henrik Ehlers (DEN)
Diego Barbas (ARG)

8 December 2009
18:05

| Argentina | 3–1 | Pakistan |
|---|---|---|
| Callioni 1'; Ibarra 31', 52' | Report | Abbas 66' |

Umpires:
Deon Nel (RSA)
Nathan Stagno (GIB)

10 December 2009
12:05

| Pakistan | 4–1 | South Africa |
|---|---|---|
| Abbas 20'; Abbasi 49'; Khan 53'; Ali 63' | Report | Norris-Jones 33' |

Umpires:
Henrik Ehlers (DEN)
Daniel Lopez Ramos (URU)

10 December 2009
18:05

| Canada | 3–2 | Argentina |
|---|---|---|
| Tupper 50'; Wright 62'; Fernandes 70+' | Report | Ibarra 54', 69' |

Umpires:
Roel van Eert (NED)
Francisco Vazquez (ESP)

== Classification round ==
=== Bracket ===
Crossover
12 December
Belgium | 3
South Africa | 4
12 December
Canada | 1
China | 3

Fifth place
13 December
South Africa | 5
China | 0
Seventh place
13 December
Belgium | 2
Canada | 0

=== Crossovers ===
12 December 2009
09:05

| Belgium | 3–4 | South Africa |
|---|---|---|
| Dekeyser 8', 14'; Charlier 51' | Report | Paton 17'; Robinson 25'; Reid-Ross 65'; Madsen 70' |

Umpires:
Francisco Vazquez (ESP)
German Montes de Oca (ARG)

12 December 2009
11:35

| Canada | 1–3 | China |
|---|---|---|
| Pearson 7' | Report | Song 11', 28'; Lu 39' |

Umpires:
Thomas Dumon (BEL)
Haider Rasool (PAK)

=== Seventh and eighth place ===
13 December 2009
09:05

| Belgium | 2–0 | Canada |
|---|---|---|
| De Paeuw 24'; Pangrazio 50' | Report |

Umpires:
Nathan Stagno (GIB)
German Montes de Oca (ARG)

=== Fifth and sixth place ===
13 December 2009
11:35

| South Africa | 5–0 | China |
|---|---|---|
| McDade 8'; Hykes 26'; Reid-Ross 38'; Carr 42'; Smith 68' | Report |

Umpires:
Diego Barbas (ARG)
Daniel Lopez Ramos (URU)

== Medal round ==
=== Bracket ===
Semi-finals
12 December
Argentina | 2
New Zealand | 3
12 December
India | 3
Pakistan | 6

Final
13 December
New Zealand | 4
Pakistan | 2
Third place
13 December
Argentina | 2
India | 3

=== Semi-finals ===
12 December 2009
14:05

| Argentina | 2–3 | New Zealand |
|---|---|---|
| Ibarra 18'; L. Vila 66' | Report | Hayward 2'; Burrows 32'; McAleese 45' |

Umpires:
Nathan Stagno (GIB)
Deon Nel (RSA)

12 December 2009
16:35

| India | 3–6 | Pakistan |
|---|---|---|
| Mahadik 8', 62'; Ram 67' | Report | Butt 2', 29', 64'; Abbas 32', 70'; Khan 58' |

Umpires:
Henrik Ehlers (DEN)
Roel van Eert (NED)

=== Third and fourth place ===
13 December 2009
14:05

| Argentina | 2–3 | India |
|---|---|---|
| Callioni 22', 29' | Report | Raghunath 35+'; Gurbaj 54'; Mahadik 69' |

Umpires:
Francisco Vazquez (ESP)
Deon Nel (RSA)

=== Final ===
13 December 2009
16:35

| New Zealand | 4–2 | Pakistan |
|---|---|---|
| Archibald 15'; Burrows 20', 66'; Edwards 65' | Report | Abbas 7'; Butt 35' |

Umpires:
Roel van Eert (NED)
Henrik Ehlers (DEN)

== Awards ==
| Top Goalscorer | Player of the Tournament | Goalkeeper of the Tournament | Fair Play Trophy |
|---|---|---|---|
| (Argentina) Pedro Ibarra | (India) Sardar Singh | (New Zealand) Kyle Pontifex | Argentina |

== Final standings ==
| Pos | Team | Pld | W | D | L | GF | GA | GD | Pts | Qualification |
|---|---|---|---|---|---|---|---|---|---|---|
| 1st place, gold medalist(s) | New Zealand | 5 | 3 | 2 | 0 | 15 | 9 | +6 | 11 | Qualified for 2011 FIH Champions Trophy |
| 2nd place, silver medalist(s) | Pakistan | 5 | 3 | 0 | 2 | 15 | 12 | +3 | 9 | |
| 3rd place, bronze medalist(s) | India | 5 | 3 | 1 | 1 | 16 | 13 | +3 | 10 | |
| 4 | Argentina (H) | 5 | 2 | 0 | 3 | 15 | 12 | +3 | 6 | |
| 5 | South Africa | 5 | 3 | 0 | 2 | 16 | 14 | +2 | 9 | |
| 6 | China | 5 | 1 | 1 | 3 | 9 | 16 | −7 | 4 | |
| 7 | Belgium | 5 | 2 | 0 | 3 | 12 | 15 | −3 | 6 | |
| 8 | Canada | 5 | 1 | 0 | 4 | 6 | 13 | −7 | 3 | |

Source: FIH
(H) Hosts

== Goalscorers ==
There were 104 goals scored in 20 matches, for an average of 5.2 goals per match.

8 goals

- (Argentina) Pedro Ibarra

7 goals

- (Pakistan) Sohail Abbas

4 goals

- (Belgium) Renaud Pangrazio
- (China) Song Yi
- (India) Dhananjay Mahadik
- (Pakistan) Rehan Butt

3 goals

- (Argentina) Facundo Callioni
- (Argentina) Lucas Vila
- (Belgium) Jérôme Dekeyser
- (India) Shivendra Singh
- (New Zealand) Phillip Burrows
- (South Africa) Justin Reid-Ross

2 goals

- (Belgium) Cédric Charlier
- (Canada) Wayne Fernandes
- (Canada) Scott Tupper
- (India) Tushar Khandker
- (India) Prabhjot Singh
- (New Zealand) Ryan Archibald
- (New Zealand) Dean Couzins
- (New Zealand) Andrew Hayward
- (New Zealand) Hugo Inglis
- (Pakistan) Abdul Haseem Khan
- (South Africa) Gareth Carr
- (South Africa) Lloyd Norris-Jones
- (South Africa) Wade Paton

1 goal

- (Argentina) Agustín Mazzilli
- (Belgium) Simon Gougnard
- (Belgium) Alexandre de Paeuw
- (Belgium) Jeffrey Thys
- (Canada) Mark Pearson
- (Canada) Phillip Wright
- (China) Hu Huiren
- (China) Liu Xiantang
- (China) Liu Yixian
- (China) Lu Fenghui
- (China) Na Yubo
- (India) Vokkaliga Raghunath
- (India) Diwakar Ram
- (India) Gurbaj Singh
- (India) Rajpal Singh
- (India) Sarwanjit Singh
- (New Zealand) Simon Child
- (New Zealand) Steven Edwards
- (New Zealand) Shea McAleese
- (New Zealand) Nicholas Wilson
- (Pakistan) Shakeel Abbasi
- (Pakistan) Akhtar Ali
- (South Africa) Ian Haley
- (South Africa) Marvin Harper
- (South Africa) Julian Hykes
- (South Africa) Lloyd Madsen
- (South Africa) Thornton McDade
- (South Africa) Jonathan Robinson
- (South Africa) Austin Smith

Source: FIH
