= 2007 Men's Hockey Asia Cup =

Field hockey competition

Tournament details
- Host country: India
- City: Chennai
- Teams: 11 (from 1 Confederation)
- Venue(s): Mayor Radhakrishnan Stadium; YMCA Ground

Final positions
- Champions: India (2nd title)
- Runner-up: South Korea
- Third place: Malaysia

Tournament statistics
- Matches played: 35
- Goals scored: 282 (8.06 per match)

The 2007 Men's Hockey Asia Cup was the seventh edition of the Hockey Asia Cup for men. It was held from 31 August – 9 September 2007 in Chennai, India. India won the final, defeating Korea 7-–2. Malaysia came in third.

India led 3–1 at halftime. In the early stages of the second half, Korea staged a walkout over a decision by the umpire to disallow a goal scored by Korea. India scored a goal through a counterattack in the next minute, while two Korean forwards had continued to argue with the umpire on the disallowed goal. India's forward line scored 3 more goals to make it 7–1, before Korea reduced the margin to 7–2 in the penultimate minute.

Baljit Singh, the Indian goalkeeper, was declared the man of the match. All 7 goals of India's goals 'field' goals, and none came through penalty corners or penalty strokes.

Malaysia got a medal in the Hockey Asia Cup for the first time. It was also the first time since 1982 that Pakistan did not qualify for the semi-finals in the Hockey Asia Cup. Pakistan lost to Japan 3–1 and drew their league match against Malaysia 3–3. Pakistan lost to China in the 5th/6th place playoff, and ended 6th in the tournament.

== Participants ==
- Bangladesh
- China
- Hong Kong
- India
- Japan
- Malaysia
- Pakistan
- Singapore
- South Korea
- Sri Lanka
- Thailand

== Pools ==
All times are Indian Standard Time (UTC +5.30)

=== Pool A ===
Team	Pts	Pld	W	D	L	GF	GA	GD
Malaysia	10	4	3	1	0	26	4	+22
Japan	9	4	3	0	1	18	4	+14
Pakistan	7	4	2	1	1	18	7	+11
Hong Kong	3	4	1	0	3	6	28	−22
Singapore	0	4	0	0	4	2	27	−25

31 August 2007
07:30

Malaysia	8–0	Singapore
Zulkifli Mohd Rejab 3', 46'; Megat Azrafiq 22'; Abu 33'; Azlan Misron 48', 68'; Chua Boon Huat 67', 69'

31 August 2007
17:00

Pakistan	6–1	Hong Kong
Imran 11', 29'; Abbasi 13', 59'; Ihsan Ullah 38'; Imran Khan 56'		Arif Ali 46'

1 September 2007
15:00

Japan	3–1	Pakistan
Ono Tomonori 29', 50'; Yamabori Takahiko 42'		Abbasi 47'

1 September 2007
16:00

Malaysia	13–1	Hong Kong
Kelvinder Singh 13', 27', 58'; B. Singh 22', 41', 52'; Zulkifli Mohd Rejab 25', 56'; Jiwa Mohan 30'; Chua Boon Huat 33'; Ahmad Tajuddin 45'; Mohd Shahrun 68'; Sandrakasi 70'		Mohammed Swalik 12'

3 September 2007
15:00

Japan	7–1	Hong Kong
Takahiko Yamabori 2', 28', 46', 65', 67', 70'; Kazuo Yoshida 23'		Arif Ali 53'

3 September 2007
17:00

Pakistan	8–0	Singapore
Imran 4'; Abbas Haider 23', 27'; Aziz 25'; Ihsan Ullah 40'; Imran Khan 63'; Butt 67', 70'

4 September 2007
15:00

Hong Kong	3–2	Singapore
Gurvinder Dillon 24'; Ali 60'; Harinder Singh Bal 68'		Saiful Nizam 7'; Hazmi Bin Mohd 54'

4 September 2007
19:00

Japan	0–2	Malaysia
		Abu 1'; Azlan Misron 41'

5 September 2007
19:00

Pakistan	3–3	Malaysia
Shakeel Abassi 17', 26'; Akhtar Ali 33'		Ahmad Tajuddin 43', 57'; Megat Azrafiq 69'

6 September 2007
15:00

Japan	8–0	Singapore
Takahiko Yamabori 6', 8', 12'; Kazuo Yoshida 26'; Kazuhiro Tsubouchi 33'; Mitsuru Ito 42'; A. Ito 54'; Sho Ota 58'

=== Pool B ===
Team	Pts	Pld	W	D	L	GF	GA	GD
India	15	5	5	0	0	46	2	+44
South Korea	10	5	3	1	1	41	8	+33
China	10	5	3	1	1	32	6	+26
Bangladesh	6	5	2	0	3	16	22	−6
Sri Lanka	3	5	1	0	4	15	46	−31
Thailand	0	5	0	0	5	1	67	−66

31 August 2007
09:30

Bangladesh	13–0	Thailand
Md Jahid Bin Talib 4'; Mahmud 10', 19', 67', 69'; Khondokar Hasan 24'; Md Iqbal Nadir 39', 45'; Md Zahidul Islam 40', 59'; Md Kamun 52', 55'; Md Mamun 62'

31 August 2007
15:00

South Korea	12–2	Sri Lanka
Oh Dae-keun 3'; Lee Jae-won 6'; Kim Byung-hoon 12', 22', 28', 62'; Jang Jong-hyun 16', 24', 41', 46'; You Hyo-sik 61' (one unknown) ?'		MM Gazalli 52' (one unknown) ?'

31 August 2007
19:00

India	1–0	China
D. Tirkey 48'	Report

1 September 2007
14:00

South Korea	16–0	Thailand
Kim Byung-hoon 7', 11', 33', 66'; Seo Jong-ho 16', 18', 40', 69'; Kang Seong-jung 28'; Lee Nam-yong 35'; Kang Moon-kweon 36', 43'; Kim Chul 42', 58'; Jang Jong-hyun 47', 55'

1 September 2007
17:00

China	6–0	Bangladesh
Hu Huiren 6'; Na Yubo 11', 14', 66'; Lu Fenghui 39'; Yu Yang 49'

1 September 2007
19:00

India	20–0	Sri Lanka
D. Tirkey 2'; S. Singh 3', 63'; Khandekar 6', 23', 37'; P. Singh 10', 14', 38', 47', 49'; Raghunath 28', 61', 62'; Sunil 30', 34', 35'; I. Tirkey 57', 64'; R. Singh 69'	Report

3 September 2007
07:30

Bangladesh	3–2	Sri Lanka
Mahmud 4'; Md. Mamun 46'; Md. Zahidul Islam 49'		Hettiarachchi 31'; Karunarathne 58'

3 September 2007
09:30

China	13–0	Thailand
Hu Huiren 14', 25', 27', 54', 66', 67'; Meng Jun 20', 68'; Yu Yang 31', 32'; Lu Fenghui 35', 38'; Meng Lizhi 64'

3 September 2007
19:00

India	3–2	South Korea
S. Singh 20'; I. Tirkey 31'; P. Singh 34'	Report	Jang Jong-hyun 9'; Oh Dae-keun 28'

4 September 2007
17:00

India	6–0	Bangladesh
Raghunath 31', 66'; Khandekar 37'; S. Singh 38'; P. Singh 49', 57'	Report

5 September 2007
15:00

Thailand	1–9	Sri Lanka
Sadkorn Wimuttan 60'		Gazally 10', 67'; Anju Hewage 15', 38'; Hettiarachchi 17', 63'; Karunarathne 27'; Pradeep Priyashantha 51'; Abeyrathne 70'

5 September 2007
17:00

South Korea	3–3	China
Oh Dae-keun 21'; Jang Jong-hyun 52'; Kang Seong-jung 53'		Meng Lizhi 11'; Li Wei 59'; Luo Fangming 70'

6 September 2007
16:00

China	10–2	Sri Lanka
Hu Huiren 11', 51', 61'; Hu Liang 13'; De Yunze 33', 38', 42'; Jiang Xishang 49', 56'; Meng Lizhi 65'		Camer 64'; Panditharathne 70'

6 September 2007
17:00

South Korea	8–0	Bangladesh
Jang Jong-hyun 2', 13', 28', 47'; Yoon Sung-hoon 26'; Kang Moon-kweon 32', 53'; Kim Jong-hoon 49'

6 September 2007
19:00

India	16–0	Thailand
Raghunath 2', 7', 13', 18', 26', 56'; P. Singh 27', 29', 62'; Khandekar 28', 34'; Sunil 35'; G. Singh 38'; R. Singh 54', 57', 59'	Report

== Ninth to eleventh place classification ==
=== Crossover ===
8 September 2007
08:00

Singapore	4–0	Thailand
Nee Yong 18'; Johnson Sivalingam 35'; Hazmi Bin Mohd 53', 57'

=== Ninth and tenth place ===
8 September 2007
08:00

Sri Lanka	6–0	Singapore
Summandarathne 14'; Hettiarachchi 27'; Abeyrathne 47'; Nimanka Srimal 55'; Jayasundara 65'; Anju Hewage 69'

== Fifth to eighth place classification ==
=== Crossover ===
8 September 2007
07:00

Pakistan	10–0	Bangladesh
Waqas Shariff 8'; Yasir Islam 11'; Aziz 17', 68'; Imran 24', 45'; Abbas Haider 50', 56'; Arshad 63', 65'

8 September 2007
09:30

China	6–1	Hong Kong
Liu Xiang 12', 24'; Huang Wei 29', 41'; Liu Xian 35'; Hu Huiren 61'		Ali 5'

=== Seventh and eighth place ===
9 September 2007
07:00

Bangladesh	3–1	Hong Kong
Mahmud 35', 59'; Md Jahid Bin Talib 46'		Ali 23'

=== Fifth and sixth place ===
9 September 2007
09:30

Pakistan	2–3	China
Arshad 30'; Butt 44'		De Yunze 12', 54'; Hu Liang 68'

== First to fourth place classification ==
=== Semi-finals ===
8 September 2007
17:00

Malaysia	1–2	South Korea
Azlon Misron 37'		Oh Dae-keun 9'; Yoon Sung-hoon 63'

8 September 2007
19:30

India	4–1	Japan
S. Singh 22'; P. Singh 23', 69'; Minz 54'	Report	Takahiko Yamabori 68'

=== Third and fourth place ===
9 September 2007
16:00

Malaysia	5–3	Japan
Kevinder Singh 4'; Sandrakasi 13'; Chua Boon Huat 18', 22'; Abu 64'		Takahiko Yamabori 2'; Katsuyoshi Nagasawa 67'; Kei Kawakami 70'

=== Final ===
9 September 2007
18:30

India	7–2	South Korea
S. Singh 4'; Sunil 13'; P. Singh 31', 64'; R. Singh 42', 55'; I. Tirkey 53'	Report	Jang Jong-hyun 8'; Oh Dae-keun 68'

== Winners ==
2007 Men's Hockey Asia Cup winners

India
Second title

== Final standings ==
1. India
2. South Korea
3. Malaysia
4. Japan
5. China
6. Pakistan
7. Bangladesh
8. Hong Kong
9. Sri Lanka
10. Singapore
11. Thailand
