= 2007 Sultan Azlan Shah Cup =

Field hockey tournament

Tournament details
- Host country: Malaysia
- City: Ipoh
- Dates: 5–13 May
- Teams: 8
- Venue: Azlan Shah Stadium

Final positions
- Champions: Australia (5th title)
- Runner-up: Malaysia
- Third place: India

Tournament statistics
- Matches played: 20
- Goals scored: 78 (3.9 per match)
- Top scorer: (China) Song Yi (5 goals)

The 2007 Sultan Azlan Shah Cup was the 16th edition of field hockey tournament the Sultan Azlan Shah Cup.

== Participating nations ==
Eight countries participated in the tournament:

- India
- Malaysia
- Australia
- Pakistan
- Argentina
- China
- Canada
- South Korea

== Fixtures and results ==
All times are Malaysia Standard Time (UTC+08:00)

=== Preliminary round ===
==== Pool A ====
Pos	Team	Pld	W	D	L	GF	GA	GD	Pts	Qualification
1	Australia	3	2	0	1	8	3	+5	6	Semi-finals
2	India	3	2	0	1	7	5	+2	6	Semi-finals
3	Argentina	3	2	0	1	4	4	0	6	
4	China	3	0	0	3	8	15	−7	0	

Source: Rediff
Rules for classification: 1) points; 2) goal difference; 3) goals scored; 4) head-to-head result.

5 May 2007
16:05

Australia	1–0	India
Ockenden 50'	Report

6 May 2007
16:05

Argentina	1–0	Australia
Rossi 48'	Report

6 May 2007
20:05

India	5–4	China
Prabhjot 5'; Raghunath 19', 43'; Rajpal 35'; Lakra 60'	Report	Yu 4'; Song Y. 20', 62'; Hu 37'

7 May 2007
18:05

Argentina	3–2	China
Vila 13', 32'; Rossi 63'	Report	Liu X. 25'; Song Y. 59'

9 May 2007
18:05

Australia	7–2	China
Ford 15', 47'; Naylor 19'; Livermore 35'; Schubert 37', 52', 63'	Report	Meng 42'; Song Y. 70'

9 May 2007
20:05

India	2–0	Argentina
Chhikara 66'; Khandekar 69'	Report

==== Pool B ====
Pos	Team	Pld	W	D	L	GF	GA	GD	Pts	Qualification
1	Malaysia (H)	3	2	1	0	5	2	+3	7	Semi-finals
2	South Korea	3	2	0	1	5	3	+2	6	Semi-finals
3	Pakistan	3	1	1	1	6	6	0	4	
4	Canada	3	0	0	3	0	5	−5	0	

Source: Rediff
Rules for classification: 1) points; 2) goal difference; 3) goals scored; 4) head-to-head result.
(H) Hosts

5 May 2007
18:05

South Korea	1–0	Canada
Jeong 44'	Report

5 May 2007
20:05

Pakistan	2–2	Malaysia
I. Khan 13'; Warsi 42'	Report	Zulkifli 6'; Ismail 29'

6 May 2007
18:05

Malaysia	2–0	Canada
Mohan 10'; Shahrun 70'	Report

8 May 2007
18:05

Pakistan	2–0	Canada
S. Khan 4'; Ali 33'	Report

8 May 2007
20:05

Malaysia	1–0	South Korea
Ismail 59'	Report

9 May 2007
16:05

South Korea	4–2	Pakistan
Kang M. 9'; Jeong 24', 47'; Hong 61'	Report	Aziz 4'; Imran 13'

=== Classification round ===
==== Fifth to eighth place classification ====
Crossover
10 May 2007
Argentina	3
Canada	0
10 May 2007
Pakistan	3
China	1

Fifth Place
12 May 2007
Argentina	4
Pakistan	2
Seventh Place
12 May 2007
Canada	2
China	4

===== Crossover =====
10 May 2007
18:05

Argentina	3–0	Canada
Corradini 29'; Gilardi 31'; Ibarra 66'	Report

10 May 2007
20:05

Pakistan	3–1	China
	Report

===== Seventh and eighth place =====
12 May 2007
15:35

Canada	2–4	China
Fernandes 27'; Wettlaufer 34'	Report	Liu X. 17', 66', 69'; Song 27'

===== Fifth and sixth place =====
12 May 2007
18:05

Argentina	4–2	Pakistan
Ibarra 11', 65'; Rossi 16'; Garreta 24'	Report	I. Khan 47'; Butt 61'

==== First to fourth place classification ====
Semi-finals
11 May 2007
Australia	6
South Korea	2
11 May 2007
Malaysia	2
India	1

Final
13 May 2007
Australia	3
Malaysia	1
Third Place
13 May 2007
South Korea	0
India	1

===== Semi-finals =====
11 May 2007
18:05

Australia	6–2	South Korea
Abbott 9', 68'; A. Smith 14'; De Young 37', 60'; Matheson 51'	Report	Jeong 12'; Lee S. 51'

11 May 2007
20:05

Malaysia	2–1	India
Tengku 11'; Kelvinder 40'	Report	Shivendra 14'

===== Third and Fourth place =====
13 May 2007
15:35

South Korea	0–1	India
	Report	Sardar 56'

===== Final =====
13 May 2007
18:05

Australia	3–1	Malaysia
Ockenden 39', 41'; Ford 53'	Report	Mohan 70'

== Final standings ==
- This ranking does not reflect the actual performance of the team as the ranking issued by the International Hockey Federation. This is just a benchmark ranking in the Sultan Azlan Shah Cup only.

Position	Team
1	Australia
2	Malaysia
3	India
4	South Korea
5	Argentina
6	Pakistan
7	China
8	Canada

== Goalscorers ==
There were 78 goals scored in 20 matches, for an average of 3.9 goals per match.

5 goals

- (China) Song Yi

4 goals

- (China) Liu Xiantang
- (South Korea) Jeong Yun-sang

3 goals

- (Argentina) Pedro Ibarra
- (Argentina) Lucas Rossi
- (Australia) Russell Ford
- (Australia) Edward Ockenden
- (Australia) Grant Schubert

2 goals

- (Argentina) Rodrigo Vila
- (Australia) Desmond Abbott
- (Australia) Liam de Young
- (India) Vokkaliga Ramachandra Raghunath
- (Malaysia) Ismail Abu
- (Malaysia) Mohan Jiwa
- (Pakistan) Ihsan Ullah Khan

1 goal

- (Argentina) Agustín Corradini
- (Argentina) Juan Garreta
- (Argentina) Juan Ignacio Gilardi
- (Australia) Brent Livermore
- (Australia) Eli Matheson
- (Australia) Matthew Naylor
- (Australia) Andrew Smith
- (Canada) Wayne Fernandes
- (Canada) Paul Wettlaufer
- (China) Hu Huiren
- (China) Meng Lizhi
- (China) Yu Yang
- (India) Bimal Lakra
- (India) Bharat Chhikara
- (India) Tushar Khandekar
- (India) Prabhjot Singh
- (India) Rajpal Singh
- (India) Sardara Singh
- (India) Shivendra Singh
- (Malaysia) Shahrun Nabil
- (Malaysia) Zulkifli Rejab
- (Malaysia) Kelvinder Singh
- (Malaysia) Tengku Ahmad Tajuddin
- (Pakistan) Akhtar Ali
- (Pakistan) Tariq Aziz
- (Pakistan) Rehan Butt
- (Pakistan) Muhammad Imran
- (Pakistan) Shabbir Khan
- (Pakistan) Syed Imran Ali Warsi
- (South Korea) Hong Eun-seong
- (South Korea) Kang Moon-kweon
- (South Korea) Lee Sung-min
