= Field hockey at the 2006 Asian Games =

Field Hockey tournament in Doha, Qatar

- Venue: Al-Rayyan Hockey Field
- Dates: 2 December 2006 – 14 December 2006
- Competitors: 271 from 10 nations

Medalists
gold medal	South Korea (men); China (women)
silver medal	China (men); Japan (women)
bronze medal	Pakistan (men); India (women)

The field hockey tournament at the 2006 Asian Games was held from 2 to 14 December 2006 in Al-Rayyan Hockey Field.

In this event, 10 teams participated in men's field hockey events and 7 teams in the women's events. China and South Korea became champions in the men's and women's field hockey events, respectively.

== Medalists ==
Event	Gold	Silver	Bronze
Men	South Korea; Ko Dong-sik; Lee Seung-il; Kim Chul; Kim Yong-bae; Lee Nam-yong; Seo Jong-ho; Kang Seong-jung; Yoon Sung-hoon; You Hyo-sik; Yeo Chang-yong; Cha Jong-bok; Lee Myung-ho; Hong Eun-seong; Hong Sung-kweon; Yeo Woon-kon; Jang Jong-hyun	China; Luo Fangming; Ye Peng; Jiang Xishang; Lu Fenghui; Li Wei; Song Yi; Meng Xuguang; Liu Xiantang; Hu Liang; Meng Jun; Yu Yang; Na Yubo; Pei Zuopeng; Su Rifeng; Hu Huiren	Pakistan; Salman Akbar; Zeeshan Ashraf; Ihsanullah Khan; Imran Khan Yousafzai; Adnan Maqsood; Sajjad Anwar; Tariq Aziz; Rashid Imran; Shakeel Abbasi; Rehan Butt; Muhammad Zubair; Nasir Ahmed; Imran Ali Warsi; Muhammad Imran; Muhammad Waqas; Muhammad Mudassar
Women	China; Nie Yali; Chen Zhaoxia; Ma Yibo; Mai Shaoyan; Huang Junxia; Fu Baorong; Li Shuang; Gao Lihua; Tang Chunling; Zhou Wanfeng; Sun Zhen; Zhang Yimeng; Li Hongxia; Ren Ye; Chen Qiuqi; Bao Ejing	Japan; Rie Terazono; Ikuko Okamura; Mayumi Ono; Keiko Miura; Chie Kimura; Yukari Yamamoto; Rika Komazawa; Sakae Morimoto; Kaori Chiba; Tomomi Komori; Toshie Tsukui; Yuko Kitano; Sachimi Iwao; Akemi Kato; Miyuki Nakagawa; Misaki Ozawa	India; Dipika Murthy; Suman Bala; Rajwinder Kaur; Asunta Lakra; Binita Xess; Surinder Kaur; Mamta Kharab; Marita Tirkey; Joydeep Kaur; Ritu Rani; Jasjeet Kaur Handa; Jyoti Sunita Kullu; Pushpa Pradhan; Saba Anjum Karim; Binita Toppo; Subhadra Pradhan

== Medal table ==
Rank	Nation	Gold	Silver	Bronze	Total
1	China	1	1	0	2
2	South Korea	1	0	0	1
3	Japan	0	1	0	1
4	India	0	0	1	1
4	Pakistan	0	0	1	1
Totals (5 entries)		2	2	2	6

== Qualification ==
Top 6 Asian teams, South Korea, India, Pakistan, Japan, China and Malaysia could enter the men's competition directly. For the next four spots a qualification tournament was held in Dhaka, Bangladesh from 11 to 20 May 2006.

Women's qualification tournament was held in Kuala Lumpur, Malaysia from 5 to 9 June 2006. All four teams qualified for the Asian Games but later Pakistan withdrew.

Men

Rank	Team
1	Bangladesh
2	Oman
3	Chinese Taipei
4	Hong Kong
5	Singapore
6	Sri Lanka
7	Iran

Women

Rank	Team
1	Malaysia
2	Chinese Taipei
3	Hong Kong
4	Pakistan

== Draw ==
The teams were distributed according to their position at the FIH World Rankings using the serpentine system for their distribution.

Pool A

- Pakistan (5)
- Japan (12)
- Malaysia (14)
- Hong Kong (28)
- Chinese Taipei (33)

Pool B

- South Korea (6)
- India (7)
- China (19)
- Bangladesh (31)
- Oman (59)

== Final standing ==
=== Men ===
Rank	Team	Pld	W	D	L
1st place, gold medalist(s)	South Korea	6	5	1	0
2nd place, silver medalist(s)	China	6	4	0	2
3rd place, bronze medalist(s)	Pakistan	6	3	2	1
4	Japan	6	2	2	2
5	India	6	4	1	1
6	Malaysia	6	3	2	1
7	Bangladesh	6	2	0	4
8	Chinese Taipei	6	1	0	5
9	Hong Kong	5	1	0	4
10	Oman	5	0	0	5

=== Women ===
Rank	Team	Pld	W	D	L
1st place, gold medalist(s)	China	7	6	0	1
2nd place, silver medalist(s)	Japan	7	5	1	1
3rd place, bronze medalist(s)	India	7	4	0	3
4	South Korea	7	4	1	2
5	Malaysia	7	3	0	4
6	Chinese Taipei	7	0	1	6
7	Hong Kong	6	0	1	5
