= Field hockey at the 2014 Asian Games =

Field Hockey tournament in Incheon, South Korea

- Venue: Seonhak Hockey Stadium
- Dates: 20 September – 2 October 2014
- Competitors: 288 from 13 nations

Field hockey at the 2014 Asian Games was held in Incheon, South Korea from 20 September to 2 October 2014.

The winners of the tournament qualified as Asian representatives to the 2016 Summer Olympics.

== Medalists ==
Event	Gold	Silver	Bronze
Men	India; Rupinder Pal Singh; Kothajit Singh; Manpreet Singh; Sardara Singh; Dharamvir Singh; V. R. Raghunath; Gurbaj Singh; P. R. Sreejesh; Danish Mujtaba; Gurwinder Singh Chandi; S. V. Sunil; Birendra Lakra; Akashdeep Singh; Chinglensana Singh; Ramandeep Singh; Nikkin Thimmaiah	Pakistan; Imran Butt; Muhammad Imran; Muhammad Irfan; Ammad Shakeel Butt; Fareed Ahmed; Rashid Mehmood; Muhammad Waqas; Muhammad Umar Bhutta; Abdul Haseem Khan; Shafqat Rasool; Shakeel Abbasi; Muhammad Rizwan; Muhammad Tousiq; Muhammad Rizwan; Muhammad Dilber; Kashif Shah	South Korea; Lee Myung-ho; Oh Dae-keun; Lee Nam-yong; Kang Moon-kweon; Lee Seung-il; Yoon Sung-hoon; You Hyo-sik; Jung Man-jae; Kang Moon-kyu; Hyun Hye-sung; Hong Eun-seong; Kim Young-jin; Lee Seung-hoon; Kim Seong-kyu; Jang Jong-hyun; Nam Hyun-woo
Women	South Korea; Heo Jae-seong; Kim Hyun-ji; Shin Hye-jeong; An Hyo-ju; Han Hye-lyoung; Park Mi-hyun; Kim Jong-eun; Kim Da-rae; Cho Eun-ji; Seo Jung-eun; Kim Ok-ju; Oh Sun-soon; Park Ki-ju; Jang Soo-ji; Lee Young-sil; Cheon Eun-bi	China; Li Dongxiao; Wang Mengyu; Huang Ting; Xu Xiaoxu; De Jiaojiao; Cui Qiuxia; Wu Mengrong; Xi Xiayun; Peng Yang; Liang Meiyu; Wang Na; Li Hongxia; Zhang Xiaoxue; Sun Xiao; Zhao Yudiao; Song Qingling	India; Navjot Kaur; Deep Grace Ekka; Monika Malik; Thokchom Chanchan Devi; Savita Punia; Ritu Rani; Poonam Rani; Vandana Kataria; Deepika Thakur; Namita Toppo; Jaspreet Kaur; Sunita Lakra; Sushila Chanu; Rani Rampal; Amandeep Kaur; Lilima Minz

== Medal table ==
Rank	Nation	Gold	Silver	Bronze	Total
1	India (IND)	1	0	1	2
1	South Korea (KOR)	1	0	1	2
3	China (CHN)	0	1	0	1
3	Pakistan (PAK)	0	1	0	1
Totals (4 entries)		2	2	2	6

== Qualification ==
Top 6 Asian teams, South Korea, India, Pakistan, Japan, China and Malaysia could enter the men's competition directly. For the next six spots a qualification tournament was held in Dhaka, Bangladesh from 15 to 23 March 2014.

Women's qualification tournament was held in Bangkok, Thailand from 15 to 23 February 2014. All four teams qualified for the Asian Games but later Chinese Taipei withdrew from both tournaments, Iran also pulled out from the men's competition.

Men

Rank	Team
1	Bangladesh
2	Oman
3	Sri Lanka
4	Singapore
5	Iran
6	Chinese Taipei
7	Qatar
8	Hong Kong

Women

Rank	Team
1	Kazakhstan
2	Thailand
3	Chinese Taipei
4	Hong Kong

== Draw ==
The teams were distributed according to their position at the FIH World Rankings using the serpentine system for their distribution.

=== Men ===
Pool A

- South Korea (8)
- Malaysia (13)
- Japan (14)
- Bangladesh (30)
- Singapore (36)

Pool B

- India (9)
- Pakistan (11)
- Oman (22)
- China (27)
- Sri Lanka (40)

=== Women ===
Pool A

- China (5)
- India (13)
- Malaysia (21)
- Thailand (53)

Pool B

- South Korea (9)
- Japan (10)
- Kazakhstan (33)
- Hong Kong (40)

== Final standing ==
=== Men ===
Rank	Team	Pld	W	D	L
1st place, gold medalist(s)	India	6	4	1	1
2nd place, silver medalist(s)	Pakistan	6	4	2	0
3rd place, bronze medalist(s)	South Korea	6	5	0	1
4	Malaysia	6	3	1	2
5	China	5	2	1	2
6	Japan	5	2	1	2
7	Oman	5	2	0	3
8	Bangladesh	5	1	0	4
9	Singapore	5	1	0	4
10	Sri Lanka	5	0	0	5

=== Women ===
Rank	Team	Pld	W	D	L
1st place, gold medalist(s)	South Korea	5	5	0	0
2nd place, silver medalist(s)	China	5	4	0	1
3rd place, bronze medalist(s)	India	5	3	0	2
4	Japan	5	2	0	3
5	Malaysia	4	2	0	2
6	Kazakhstan	4	1	0	3
7	Thailand	4	1	0	3
8	Hong Kong	4	0	0	4
