= Field hockey at the 2006 Asian Games – Men's tournament =

Men at the 2006 Asian Games
- Venue: Al-Rayyan Hockey Field
- Date: 4 December 2006 – 14 December 2006
- Competitors: 159 from 10 nations

Medalists
gold medal	South Korea
silver medal	China
bronze medal	Pakistan

The men's field hockey tournament at the 2006 Asian Games was held in Al-Rayyan Hockey Field, Doha, Qatar, from December 4 to December 14, 2006.

== Squads ==
Bangladesh	China	Chinese Taipei	Hong Kong
Rasel Khan Bappi; Isa Mia; Mamunur Rahman Chayan; Moshiur Rahman Biplob; Mahbubul Ahsan Rana; Khondokar Hasan Ahmed; Zahidul Islam Rajon; Shahidullah Titu; Maksud Alam; Rasel Mahmud Jimmy; Mazharul Islam; Shamsuddin Tuhin; Zahid Hossain; Hedayetul Islam Khan; Musa Mia; Yamin Hossain	Luo Fangming; Ye Peng; Jiang Xishang; Lu Fenghui; Li Wei; Song Yi; Meng Xuguang; Liu Xiantang; Hu Liang; Meng Jun; Yu Yang; Na Yubo; Pei Zuopeng; Su Rifeng; Hu Huiren	Chen Chih-wei; Tang Chao-ssu; Shih Yao-wen; Tseng Chia-cheng; Tsai Hung-chi; Fan Kuo-heng; Chiang Wen-pin; Tsai Ming-heng; Tang Chao-yi; Wang Min-kuan; Chen Wei-yang; Chao Wei-hsiang; Huang Po-hsiung; Lee Ju-chang; Chiang Chien-kuo; Hsieh Hsiang-jung	Chan Ka Kei; Farooq Saeed; Akbar Ali; Mustafa Mohammed; Christopher Marshall; Asif Ali; Harinder Singh Bal; Swalikh Mohammed; Jasbir Singh Chhina; Arif Ali; Asghar Ali; Alfonso Cordero; Shafiq Iqbal Mirza; Ng Shiu Bong; Gurvinder Singh Dillon; Howard Leung
India	Japan	Malaysia	Oman
Bharat Chettri; Dilip Tirkey; Harpal Singh; V. R. Raghunath; V. S. Vinaya; Arjun Halappa; Adrian D'Souza; Gurbaj Singh; Ignace Tirkey; Ajmer Singh; Rajpal Singh; Tushar Khandker; Shivendra Singh; Tejbir Singh; Hari Prasad; Adam Sinclair	Hirofumi Miyoshi; Shunsuke Nagaoka; Kazuo Yoshida; Mitsuru Ito; Yutaka Bito; Kei Kawakami; Kenichi Katayama; Kazuyuki Ozawa; Kazuhiro Tsubouchi; Takahiko Yamabori; Toshiaki Fukuda; Akira Ito; Yuji Chaki; Takayasu Mizawa; Yoshihiro Anai; Hiroki Sakamoto	Roslan Jamaluddin; Mohd Amin Rahim; Chua Boon Huat; Sallehin Abdul Ghani; Kuhan Shanmuganathan; Nor Azlan Bakar; Megat Azrafiq Termizi; Jiwa Mohan; Madzli Ikmar; Tengku Ahmad Tajuddin; Shahrun Nabil; Sukri Mutalib; Razie Rahim; Azlan Misron; Jivan Mohan; Kumar Subramaniam	Asim Siddiq; Shahab Al-Noobi; Waleed Al-Hasani; Murshid Hawait; Husni Al-Shibli; Khalid Al-Nofali; Marwan Al-Raisi; Husam Al-Husni; Samir Al-Shibli; Amjad Bait Obaidoon; Basim Rajab; Khalid Saribakhi; Ismail Al-Balushi; Ahmed Al-Balushi; Akram Bait Shamiah; Shabr Ismail
Pakistan	South Korea		
Salman Akbar; Zeeshan Ashraf; Ihsanullah Khan; Imran Khan Yousafzai; Adnan Maqsood; Sajjad Anwar; Tariq Aziz; Rashid Imran; Shakeel Abbasi; Rehan Butt; Muhammad Zubair; Nasir Ahmed; Imran Ali Warsi; Muhammad Imran; Muhammad Waqas; Muhammad Mudassar	Ko Dong-sik; Lee Seung-il; Kim Chul; Kim Yong-bae; Lee Nam-yong; Seo Jong-ho; Kang Seong-jung; Yoon Sung-hoon; You Hyo-sik; Yeo Chang-yong; Cha Jong-bok; Lee Myung-ho; Hong Eun-seong; Hong Sung-kweon; Yeo Woon-kon; Jang Jong-hyun		

== Results ==
All times are Arabia Standard Time (UTC+03:00)

=== Preliminary league ===
==== Pool A ====
Team	Pld	W	D	L	GF	GA	GD	Pts
Pakistan	4	2	2	0	20	2	+18	8
Japan	4	2	2	0	18	3	+15	8
Malaysia	4	2	2	0	14	4	+10	8
Chinese Taipei	4	1	0	3	1	22	−21	3
Hong Kong	4	0	0	4	3	25	−22	0

4 December
15:00

Hong Kong	0–1	Chinese Taipei
		Huang Po-hsiung 61'

Al-Rayyan Hockey Field, Doha
Umpires:
Javed Nuruddin Shaikh (IND)
Latifur Rahman (BAN)

4 December
17:00

Pakistan	1–1	Malaysia
Zubair 69'		Kuhan 52'

Al-Rayyan Hockey Field, Doha
Umpires:
Tim Pullman (AUS)
Petter Markus (GER)

6 December
9:00

Japan	2–2	Malaysia
Yamabori 9', 43'		Chua Boon Huat 32'; Nabil 47'

Al-Rayyan Hockey Field, Doha
Umpires:
Chen Dekang (CHN)
Kim Hong-lae (KOR)

6 December
11:00

Pakistan	10–1	Hong Kong
Aziz 4'; Zubair 7', 9'; Waqas 8', 26'; M. Imran 25', 50', 67'; Abbasi 27'; Warsi 34'		Ar. Ali 31'

Al-Rayyan Hockey Field, Doha
Umpires:
Javed Nuruddin Shaikh (IND)
Mustafa Al-Ajmi (OMA)

7 December
15:00

Hong Kong	1–2	Malaysia
Ar. Ali 13'		Kuhan 21'; Jiw. Mohan 29'

Al-Rayyan Hockey Field, Doha
Umpires:
Kim Hong-lae (KOR)
Latifur Rahman (BAN)

7 December
17:00

Chinese Taipei	0–4	Japan
		Yoshida 10'; Mizawa 29'; Yamabori 42', 61'

Al-Rayyan Hockey Field, Doha
Umpires:
Chen Dekang (CHN)
Javed Nuruddin Shaikh (IND)

9 December
9:00

Hong Kong	1–12	Japan
Ak. Ali 69'		Sakamoto 5'; Yamabori 9', 25', 28', 51', 53', 61'; Fukuda 12', 30', 56', 70'; Tsubouchi 45'

Al-Rayyan Hockey Field, Doha
Umpires:
Mustafa Al-Ajmi (OMA)
Kim Hong-lae (KOR)

9 December
11:00

Chinese Taipei	0–9	Pakistan
		Imran 20', 23', 58'; Maqsood 28', 47'; Abbasi 30', 67'; Zubair 42'; Aziz 61'

Al-Rayyan Hockey Field, Doha
Umpires:
Chen Dekang (CHN)
Latifur Rahman (BAN)

10 December
15:00

Malaysia	9–0	Chinese Taipei
A. Rahim 4', 29', 33'; Chua Boon Huat 5', 58'; Tajuddin 17', 42'; R. Rahim 46', 66'

Al-Rayyan Hockey Field, Doha
Umpires:
Javed Nuruddin Shaikh (IND)
Kim Hong-lae (KOR)

10 December
17:00

Pakistan	0–0	Japan

Al-Rayyan Hockey Field, Doha
Umpires:
Tim Pullman (AUS)
Chen Dekang (CHN)

==== Pool B ====
Team	Pld	W	D	L	GF	GA	GD	Pts
South Korea	4	3	1	0	23	2	+21	10
China	4	3	0	1	13	7	+6	9
India	4	2	1	1	18	4	+14	7
Bangladesh	4	1	0	3	7	22	−15	3
Oman	4	0	0	4	4	30	−26	0

4 December
10:00

China	6–1	Oman
Song Yi 4', 10', 25', 45'; Yu Yang 54'; Na Yubo 68'		S. Al-Shibli 50'

Al-Rayyan Hockey Field, Doha
Umpires:
Rana Muhammad Liaqat (PAK)
Satoshi Kondo (JPN)

4 December
12:00

India	6–0	Bangladesh
D. Tirkey 3', 24', 33'; S. Singh 29'; Raghunath 43'; Sinclair 54'

Al-Rayyan Hockey Field, Doha
Umpires:
Constantine Soteriades (USA)
Yusoff Hashim (MAS)

5 December
16:00

South Korea	9–1	Bangladesh
Jang Jong-hyun 17', 30', 42', 47', 66', 67', 69'; Hong Eun-seong 54'; Seo Jong-ho 55'		M. Mia 25'

Al-Rayyan Hockey Field, Doha
Umpires:
Constantine Soteriades (USA)
Cheung Chak Tung (HKG)

5 December
18:00

India	2–3	China
R. Singh 35'; Raghunath 61'		Hu Liang 13'; Liu Xiantang 20'; Song Yi 59'

Al-Rayyan Hockey Field, Doha
Umpires:
Petter Markus (GER)
Tim Pullman (AUS)

7 December
10:00

China	4–1	Bangladesh
Hu Liang 19'; Liu Xiantang 34'; Hu Huiren 44'; Na Yubo 51'		Islam 69'

Al-Rayyan Hockey Field, Doha
Umpires:
Yusoff Hashim (MAS)
Rana Muhammad Liaqat (PAK)

7 December
12:00

Oman	0–10	South Korea
		You Hyo-sik 10'; Jang Jong-hyun 13', 52', 58', 64'; Yoon Sung-hoon 16'; Seo Jong-ho 18', 65'; Hong Sung-kweon 25'; Lee Nam-yong 66'

Al-Rayyan Hockey Field, Doha
Umpires:
Hsu Wen-i (TPE)
Tim Pullman (AUS)

8 December
16:00

China	0–3	South Korea
		Yeo Woon-kon 9'; Jang Jong-hyun 26'; Seo Jong-ho 41'

Al-Rayyan Hockey Field, Doha
Umpires:
Tim Pullman (AUS)
Constantine Soteriades (USA)

8 December
18:00

Oman	0–9	India
		S. Singh 11', 40', 60'; Prasad 28', 47'; D. Tirkey 34'; Khandker 44', 55'; Halappa 62'

Al-Rayyan Hockey Field, Doha
Umpires:
Satoshi Kondo (JPN)
Markus Petter (GER)

10 December
10:00

Bangladesh	5–3	Oman
I. Mia 9'; Jimmy 58', 68'; Titu 61'; Rajon 66'		Rajab 19', 65'; I. Al-Balushi 22'

Al-Rayyan Hockey Field, Doha
Umpires:
Satoshi Kondo (JPN)
Rana Muhammad Liaqat (PAK)

10 December
12:00

India	1–1	South Korea
Raghunath 57'		Jang Jong-hyun 41'

Al-Rayyan Hockey Field, Doha
Umpires:
Markus Petter (GER)
Conatantine Soteriades (USA)

=== Classification 9th–10th ===
12 December
9:00

Hong Kong	4–0	Oman
Asg. Ali 16'; Ar. Ali 35', 47'; S. Mohammed 58'

Al-Rayyan Hockey Field, Doha
Umpires:
Constantine Soteriades (USA)
Yusoff Hashim (MAS)

=== Classification 5th–8th ===
Semifinals
12 December
Malaysia	6
Bangladesh	1
12 December
India	12
Chinese Taipei	1

Classification 5th–6th
14 December
Malaysia	0
India	4
Classification 7th–8th
14 December
Bangladesh	5
Chinese Taipei	1

==== Semifinals ====
12 December
11:30

Malaysia	6–1	Bangladesh
Jiw. Mohan 5', 34'; Chua Boon Huat 9'; A. Rahim 24', 47'; R. Rahim 30'		Alam 16'

Al-Rayyan Hockey Field, Doha
Umpires:
Javed Nuruddin Shaikh (IND)
Satoshi Kondo (JPN)

12 December
15:00

India	12–1	Chinese Taipei
Raghunath 20', 27', 54', 55', 66'; S. Singh 35', 49'; T. Singh 39'; R. Singh 60', 63'; Sinclair 67'; Khandker 69'		Fan Kuo-heng 27'

Al-Rayyan Hockey Field, Doha
Umpires:
Cheung Chak Tung (HKG)
Mustafa Al-Ajmi (OMA)

==== Classification 7th–8th ====
14 December
9:00

Bangladesh	5–1	Chinese Taipei
Jimmy 3', 67'; Chayan 31', 38'; Rajon 66'		Tsai Ming-heng 43'

Al-Rayyan Hockey Field, Doha
Umpires:
Rana Muhammad Liaqat (PAK)
Cheung Chak Tung (HKG)

==== Classification 5th–6th ====
14 December
11:30

Malaysia	0–4	India
		Raghunath 13', 61'; R. Singh 41'; G. Singh 64'

Al-Rayyan Hockey Field, Doha
Umpires:
Constantine Soteriades (USA)
Kim Hong-lae (KOR)

=== Final round ===
Semifinals
12 December
Pakistan	1
China (a.e.t.)	2
12 December
South Korea	2
Japan	0

Gold medal match
14 December
China	1
South Korea	3
Bronze medal match
14 December
Pakistan	4
Japan	2

==== Semifinals ====
12 December
17:30

Pakistan	1–2 (a.e.t.)	China
Butt 20'		Yu Yang 39'; Lu Fenghui 79'

Al-Rayyan Hockey Field, Doha
Umpires:
Markus Petter (GER)
Kim Hong-lae (KOR)

12 December
20:00

South Korea	2–0	Japan
Jang Jong-hyun 55', 63'

Al-Rayyan Hockey Field, Doha
Umpires:
Tim Pullman (AUS)
Chen Dekang (CHN)

==== Bronze medal match ====
14 December
15:00

Pakistan	4–2	Japan
Maqsood 11'; Abbasi 32'; Waqas 41', 53'		Yamabori 9', 57'

Al-Rayyan Hockey Field, Doha
Umpires:
Markus Petter (GER)
Chen Dekang (CHN)

==== Gold medal match ====
14 December
17:30

China	1–3	South Korea
Na Yubo 9'		Yoon Sung-hoon 12'; Yeo Woon-kon 16', 66'

Al-Rayyan Hockey Field, Doha
Umpires:
Tim Pullman (AUS)
Javed Nuruddin Shaikh (IND)

== Final standing ==
Rank	Team	Pld	W	D	L
1st place, gold medalist(s)	South Korea	6	5	1	0
2nd place, silver medalist(s)	China	6	4	0	2
3rd place, bronze medalist(s)	Pakistan	6	3	2	1
4	Japan	6	2	2	2
5	India	6	4	1	1
6	Malaysia	6	3	2	1
7	Bangladesh	6	2	0	4
8	Chinese Taipei	6	1	0	5
9	Hong Kong	5	1	0	4
10	Oman	5	0	0	5
