= 2009 Men's Hockey Asia Cup =

Field hockey competition

Tournament details
- Host country: Malaysia
- City: Kuantan
- Dates: 9–16 May
- Teams: 7 (from 1 confederation)

Final positions
- Champions: South Korea (3rd title)
- Runner-up: Pakistan
- Third place: China

Tournament statistics
- Matches played: 15
- Goals scored: 82 (5.47 per match)
- Top scorer: (South Korea) Kim Byung-hoon (6 goals)
- Best player: (South Korea) You Hyo-sik

The 2009 Men's Hockey Asia Cup was the eighth edition of the Men's Hockey Asia Cup, the quadrennial international men's field hockey championship of Asia organized by the Asian Hockey Federation. It was held from May 9 to May 16, 2009 in Kuantan, Pahang, Malaysia.

The tournament was originally awarded to Dubai, United Arab Emirates by the Asian Hockey Federation (AHF) in a 2008 meeting. However, it was swapped to Malaysia due to the hockey facility in Dubai Sports City not being completed on time. The tournament was sponsored by AirAsia with MYR 500,000. South Korea won their third title and qualified for the 2010 World Cup in New Delhi, India, after defeating Pakistan 1–0 in the final.

== Teams ==
Only eight teams were to compete in this tournament, divided by two pools. However, Sri Lanka withdrew from the tournament few days before the commencement, having replaced Oman before the withdrawal. Although the tournament is reduced to seven teams, the format of the competition remains unchanged.

Dates	Event	Location	Quotas	Qualifier(s)
Host			1	Malaysia
31 August – 9 September 2007	2007 Asia Cup	Chennai, India	5	India; South Korea; Japan; China; Pakistan
14–22 June 2008	2008 AHF Cup	Singapore	1	Bangladesh; ~~Oman~~; ~~Sri Lanka~~
Total			7	

== Results ==
All times are local, MYT (UTC+8).

=== Preliminary round ===
==== Pool A ====
Pos	Team	Pld	W	D	L	GF	GA	GD	Pts	Qualification
1	South Korea	3	2	1	0	13	3	+10	7	Advance to the semi-finals
2	Malaysia (H)	3	2	1	0	12	3	+9	7	Advance to the semi-finals
3	Japan	3	1	0	2	8	7	+1	3	5th–7th place classification
4	Bangladesh	3	0	0	3	1	21	−20	0	5th–7th place classification

Source: TheSports.org
(H) Hosts

9 May 2009
17:00

South Korea	1–1	Malaysia
Jin Kyung-min 53'		Nabil 35'

Umpires:
Javed Shiekh (IND)
Anwaar Hussein (PAK)

9 May 2009
19:00

Japan	5–0	Bangladesh
Furufato 7'; Tanaka 33'; Suzuki 59'; Nagasawa 67'; Sakomoto 69'

Umpires:
Raghu Prasad (IND)
Weng Haiqin (CHN)

11 May 2009
17:00

Japan	2–3	South Korea
Kawakami 20'; Takayasu 53'		Jin Kyung-min 12'; Lee Nam-yong 22', 35'

Umpires:
Raghu Prasad (IND)
Anwar Hussain (PAK)

11 May 2009
19:00

Bangladesh	1–7	Malaysia
Zahidul 28'		Shahrun 4'; Azlan 13'; Chua 15'; Amin 20'; Tengku 39', 43'; Ismail 50'

12 May 2009
17:00

South Korea	9–0	Bangladesh
Lee Nam-yong 2'; Kim Byung-hoon 16', 37', 49', 67'; Nam Hyun-woo 29', 32'; Jin Kyung-min 60'; You Hyo-sik 68'

12 May 2009
19:00

Malaysia	4–1	Japan
Tengku 4'; Kevinder 33'; Chua 60'; Selvaraju 67'		Furusato 41'

Umpires:
Latifur Rahman (BAN)
John Wright (RSA)

==== Pool B ====
Pos	Team	Pld	W	D	L	GF	GA	GD	Pts	Qualification
1	Pakistan	2	1	1	0	4	3	+1	4	Advance to the semi-finals
2	China	2	0	2	0	3	3	0	2	Advance to the semi-finals
3	India	2	0	1	1	4	5	−1	1	5th–7th place classification

Source: TheSports.org

9 May 2009
15:00

Pakistan	1–1	China
Ali 69'		Hu Huiren 61'

10 May 2009
18:00

India	2–3	Pakistan
Prabhjot 15'; Rajpal 45'		Khan 33', 36'; Abbas 54'

12 May 2009
15:00

China	2–2	India
Lu Fenghui 45'; Yu Yang 59'		Sandeep 31', 34'

=== Fifth to seventh place classification ===
==== Seventh place ====
14 May 2009
09:00

Bangladesh	1–11	India
Iqbal Nadir Prince		Sandeep 10', 13'; Hari 34'; Arjun 39'; Raghunath 43'; S. V. Sunil 48', 57'; Rajpal 65'; Sardara 66', 69'; Prabhjot 67'

==== Fifth and sixth place ====
15 May 2009
17:00

India	5–1	Japan
Rajpal 2'; Sandeep 21'; Tushar 64', 69'; Prabhjot 66'		Sakamoto 31'

=== First to fourth place classification ===
Semi-finals
14 May
South Korea	5
China	1
14 May
Pakistan	4
Malaysia	2

Final
16 May
South Korea	1
Pakistan	0
Third place
16 May
China (p.s.)	3 (7)
Malaysia	3 (6)

==== Semi-finals ====
14 May 2009
17:00

South Korea	5–1	China
Kim Byung-hoon 28'; You Hyo-sik 38', 41', 68'; Guo Zhong-qiang 56'		Sun Zhixin 10'

Umpires:
Javed Shiekh (IND)
Simon Taylor (NZL)

14 May 2009
19:30

Pakistan	4–2	Malaysia
Butt 18', 63'; Ali 46'; Khan 66'		Ismail 3', 69'

Umpires:
John Wright (RSA)
Raghu Prasad (IND)

==== Third and fourth place ====
16 May 2009
17:00

China	3–3 (a.e.t.)	Malaysia
Sang Yi 19', 46'; Jiang Xishang 66'		Ismail 1'; Chua 32'; Nabil 64'
Penalties
Song Yi (penalty shoot-out scored); Hu Huiren (penalty shoot-out scored); Lu Fenghui (penalty shoot-out missed); Liu Xiantang (penalty shoot-out scored); Sun Tianjun (penalty shoot-out missed); Song Yi (penalty shoot-out scored); Hu Huiren (penalty shoot-out scored); Liu Xiantang (penalty shoot-out scored); Sun Tianjun (penalty shoot-out scored)	7–6	(penalty shoot-out scored) Sukri; (penalty shoot-out missed) Nabil; (penalty shoot-out scored) Jiwa; (penalty shoot-out scored) Amin; (penalty shoot-out missed) Kavinder; (penalty shoot-out scored) Amin; (penalty shoot-out scored) Jiwa; (penalty shoot-out scored) Sukri; (penalty shoot-out missed) Fiqri

Umpires:
Raghu Prasad (IND)
Fernando Gomez (ARG)

==== Final ====
16 May 2009
19:30

South Korea	1–0	Pakistan
Kim Byung-hoon 66'

Umpires:
Javed Sheikh (IND)
John Wright (RSA)

== Winners ==
2009 Men's Hockey Asia Cup winners

South Korea
Third title

== Statistics ==
=== Final standings ===
1. South Korea
2. Pakistan
3. China
4. Malaysia
5. India
6. Japan
7. Bangladesh

=== Awards ===
Topscorer	Best Player	Best Goalkeeper	Man of the match (final)
(South Korea) Kim Byung-hoon	(South Korea) You Hyo-sik	(Malaysia) Kumar Subramaniam	(South Korea) Hong Eun-seung
