= Jiang Xishang =

Chinese field hockey player

Personal information
- Born: 15 May 1980 (age 46) Dalian, Liaoning, China
- Height: 1.72 m (5 ft 8 in)

Sport
- Sport: Field hockey
National team
Years	Team	Caps	Goals
–	China		-
Medal record
Men's field hockey
Representing China
Asian Games
Bronze medal – third place	2006 Doha	Team
Asia Cup
Bronze medal – third place	2009 Kuantan

Jiang Xishang (simplified Chinese: 蒋希上; traditional Chinese: 蔣希上; pinyin: Jiǎng Xīshàng, born 15 May 1980) is a Chinese professional field hockey player who represented China at the 2008 Summer Olympics in Beijing. The team finished last in their group, and finished 11th after beating South Africa.

In 2009, Jiang Xishang and Song Yi were recruited by Pinoké.

During the finals of the 2018–19 Men's Hockey Series, Jiang served as an assistant coach for the China men's national field hockey team.
