= Su Rifeng =

Chinese field hockey player

Personal information
- Born: July 10, 1978 (age 48)
- Height: 1.75 m (5 ft 9 in)

Sport
- Sport: Field hockey
National team
Years	Team	Caps	Goals
–	China		-
Medal record
Men's field hockey
Representing China
Asian Games
Bronze medal – third place	2006 Doha	Team

Su Rifeng (Chinese: 苏日峰; pinyin: Sū Rìfēng, born 10 July 1978) is a Chinese professional field hockey player who represented China at the 2008 Summer Olympics in Beijing. The team finished last in their group, and finished 11th after beating South Africa.
