= Meng Xuguang =

Chinese field hockey player

Personal information
- Born: December 10, 1978 (age 47)
- Height: 1.75 m (5 ft 9 in)

Sport
- Sport: Field hockey
National team
Years	Team	Caps	Goals
–	China		-
Medal record
Men's field hockey
Representing China
Asian Games
Bronze medal – third place	2006 Doha	Team

Meng Xuguang (Chinese: 孟旭光; pinyin: Mèng Xùguāng, born 10 December 1978) is a Chinese professional field hockey player who represented China at the 2008 Summer Olympics in Beijing. The team finished last in their group, and finished 11th after beating South Africa.
