= Hu Liang =

Chinese field hockey player

Personal information
- Born: July 8, 1974 (age 52)
- Height: 1.72 m (5 ft 8 in)

Sport
- Sport: Field hockey
National team
Years	Team	Caps	Goals
–	China		-
Medal record
Men's field hockey
Representing China
Asian Games
Bronze medal – third place	2006 Doha	Team

Hu Liang (Chinese: 胡亮; pinyin: Hú Liàng, born 8 July 1974) is a Chinese professional field hockey player who represented China at the 2008 Summer Olympics in Beijing. The team finished last in their group, and finished 11th after beating South Africa.
