= Lu Fenghui =

Chinese field hockey player

Personal information
- Born: February 16, 1984 (age 42)
- Height: 1.75 m (5 ft 9 in)

Sport
- Sport: Field hockey
National team
Years	Team	Caps	Goals
–	China		-
Medal record
Men's field hockey
Representing China
Asian Games
Bronze medal – third place	2006 Doha	Team
Asia Cup
Bronze medal – third place	2009 Kuantan

Lu Fenghui (Chinese: 陆锋辉; pinyin: Lù Fēnghuī, born 16 February 1984) is a Chinese professional field hockey player who represented China at the 2008 Summer Olympics in Beijing. The team finished last in their group, and finished 11th after beating South Africa.
