= Pushpa Pradhan =

Indian field hockey player

Personal information
- Born: 25 November 1981 (age 44) Hesel, Khunti, Jharkhand
Medal record
Women's field hockey
Representing India
Asian Games
Bronze medal – third place	2006 Doha	Team
Asia Cup
Gold medal – first place	2004 New Delhi
Champions Challenge
Bronze medal – third place	2002 Johannesburg	Team

Pushpa Pradhan (born 25 November 1981) is an Indian former field hockey player, who represented the India women's national field hockey team. She played with the team when it won the Gold at 2004 Women's Hockey Asia Cup.

== Early life ==
Pradhan was born in Hesel village in tribal heartland Khunti, roughly 60 kilometres from Ranchi, Jharkhand, on 25 November 1981.
