= Li Wei (field hockey) =

Chinese field hockey player

Personal information
- Born: July 30, 1978 (age 48)
- Height: 1.80 m (5 ft 11 in)

Sport
- Sport: Field hockey
National team
Years	Team	Caps	Goals
–	China		-
Medal record
Men's field hockey
Representing China
Asian Games
Bronze medal – third place	2006 Doha	Team

Li Wei (Chinese: 李玮, born 30 July 1978) is a Chinese professional field hockey player who represented China at the 2008 Summer Olympics in Beijing. The team finished last in their group, and finished 11th after beating South Africa.
