= Chris Cargo =

Irish field hockey player (b. 1986)

Personal information
- Full name: Christopher Cargo
- Born: 18 February 1986 (age 40) Newtownards, Northern Ireland

Sport
- Sport: Field hockey
- Position: Midfielder / Forward
- Club: Hampstead & Westminster
Senior career
Years	Team	Caps	Goals
–	Bangor	-	-
–2009	Team Bath Buccaneers	-	-
2009–2015	Reading	-	-
2015–2017	Racing Bruxelles	-	-
2017–	Hampstead & Westminster	-	-
National team
Years	Team	Caps	Goals
2009–2019	Ireland	195	(28)
Medal record
EuroHockey Championships
Bronze medal – third place	2015 London
- Updated on 19 December 2019

Christopher Cargo (born 18 February 1986) is an Irish field hockey player who plays as a forward or midfielder for English club Hampstead & Westminster. He scored 28 goals in 195 matches from 2009 to 2019 for the Irish national team. He competed for Ireland at the 2016 Summer Olympics.

== International career ==
He came to Irish international attention with a fine performance in the 2009 interprovincial tournament as a last-minute call-up for Ulster. He impressed enough to make his Irish debut just three months later – on the same day as Paul Gleghorne – and never looked back, becoming a central panel member in 2010. His debut came at the age of 23, the second oldest debut of this current group after Jonathan Bell. He played in all of the side’s big tournaments in the past eight years including winning European bronze in 2015, achieving Olympic qualification and then playing in Rio 2016. He was also involved in the World Cup qualifying campaign in Johannesburg in 2017.

Cargo took part in the 2018 Hockey World Cup in Bhubaneswar, India. He scored against England before having the opportunity to equalise late on but could only blast over. Ireland ended up losing 4-2 and crashed out of the tournament. He announced his retirement from the national team in December 2019.
