= Luo Fangming =

Chinese field hockey player

Personal information
- Born: March 24, 1983 (age 43)
- Height: 1.73 m (5 ft 8 in)

Sport
- Sport: Field hockey
National team
| Years | Team | Caps | Goals |
| – | China | | - |
Medal record
Men's field hockey
Representing China
Asian Games
| Bronze medal – third place | 2006 Doha | Team |

Luo Fangming (simplified Chinese: 骆方明; traditional Chinese: 駱方明; pinyin: Luò Fāngmíng, born 24 March 1983) is a Chinese professional field hockey player who represented China at the 2008 Summer Olympics in Beijing. The team finished last in their group, and finished 11th after beating South Africa.
