= Song Yi (field hockey) =

Chinese field hockey player

Personal information
- Born: 13 November 1980 (age 45) Liaoning, China
- Height: 1.78 m (5 ft 10 in)

Sport
- Sport: Field hockey
National team
Years	Team	Caps	Goals
–	China		-
Medal record
Men's field hockey
Representing China
Asian Games
Bronze medal – third place	2006 Doha	Team
Asia Cup
Bronze medal – third place	2009 Kuantan

Song Yi (Chinese: 宋毅; pinyin: Sòng Yì, born 13 November 1980) is a Chinese professional field hockey player who represented China at the 2008 Summer Olympics in Beijing. The team finished last in their group, and finished 11th after beating South Africa.

Song, who was captain of the Olympic game field hockey team, is a member of the Liaoning Provincial Hockey Team. During the 2008 Olympics field hockey game against Germany, Song sustained a laceration wound to the chin after being struck by midfielder Tibor Weißenborn, which led to calls to have Weißenborn barred from the games. Twelve hours after the game, the International Hockey Federation decided that the incident was accidental and thus not subject to punitive measures.

In 2009, Song Yi and Jiang Xishang were recruited by Pinoké.

In 2012, Song again served as a captain, for the Chinese men's hockey team during the 2012 Men's Asian Champions Trophy. In 2016, Song was the coach of the Chinese men's hockey team during the 2016 Men's Asian Champions Trophy.
