= Gurwinder Singh Chandi =

Indian field hockey player (born 1989)

Personal information
- Born: 20 October 1989 (age 36) Jalandhar, Punjab, India
- Height: 174 cm (5 ft 9 in) (2014)
- Weight: 67 kg (148 lb) (2014)

Sport
- Sport: Field hockey
- Position: Forward
Senior career
Years	Team	Caps	Goals
2011–present	Pune Strykers	-	-
2013–present	Delhi Waveriders	13	5
National team
Years	Team	Caps	Goals
2003–	India U16		-
2008–present	India	97	(22)
Medal record
Men's field hockey
Representing India
Asian Games
Gold medal – first place	2014 Incheon	Team
Commonwealth Games
Silver medal – second place	2010 Delhi	Team
Silver medal – second place	2014 Glasgow	Team
Asian Champions Trophy
Gold medal – first place	2011 Ordos City
Silver medal – second place	2012 Doha	Team
U16 Asia Cup
Gold medal – first place	2003 Dhaka
- Updated on 14 October 2026

Gurwinder Singh Chandi (born 20 October 1989 in Jalandhar, India) in an Indian professional field hockey forward who plays for the Indian national field hockey team.

== Career ==
Chandi made his debut for the national side in the 4-Nations Cup in Australia in the year 2008. He represented India in Men's Hockey during the 2012 London Olympics. He won a silver medal with India at the 2014 Commonwealth Games.

=== Hockey India League ===
In the inaugural Hockey India League auctions, Gurwinder Singh Chandi was bought by the Delhi franchise for US$50,000, with his base price being US$13,900.
