= Meng Jun =

Chinese field hockey player

Personal information
- Born: November 5, 1982 (age 43)
- Height: 1.70 m (5 ft 7 in)

Sport
- Sport: Field hockey
National team
Years	Team	Caps	Goals
–	China		-
Medal record
Men's field hockey
Representing China
Asian Games
Bronze medal – third place	2006 Doha	Team

Meng Jun (Chinese: 孟军; pinyin: Mèng Jūn, born 5 November 1982) is a Chinese professional field hockey player who represented China at the 2008 Summer Olympics in Beijing. The team finished last in their group, and finished 11th after beating South Africa.
