= Benjamin Van Hove =

Belgian field hockey player

Benjamin Van Hove (born 17 January 1981) is a Belgian field hockey player. At the 2012 Summer Olympics, he competed for the national team in the men's tournament.
