= Shahrun Nabil =

Malaysian field hockey player (born 1986)

Personal information
- Born: 5 January 1986 (age 40) Kuala Terengganu, Terengganu, Malaysia

Sport
- Sport: Field hockey
- Position: Midfielder
Senior career
Years	Team	Caps	Goals
2003–2013	Kuala Lumpur HC	-	-
2013–	Terengganu Hockey Team	-	-
National team
Years	Team	Caps	Goals
2005–	Malaysia	190+	-
Medal record
Men's field hockey
Representing Malaysia
Asian Games
Silver medal – second place	2010 Guangzhou	Team
Men's Hockey Asia Cup
Bronze medal – third place	2007 Chennai	Team
Asian Champions Trophy
Bronze medal – third place	2011 Ordos	Team
Bronze medal – third place	2012 Doha	Team
SEA Games
Gold medal – first place	2013 Naypyidaw	Team
Sultan Azlan Shah Cup
Silver medal – second place	2013 Ipoh	Team

Mohamed Shahrun Nabil Abdullah (born 5 January 1986) is a field hockey player from Kuala Terengganu, Terengganu, Malaysia.

Shahrun has more than 190 caps for Malaysia. He was part of Malaysia junior team in the 2005 Junior World Cup. He currently the skipper of Malaysia hockey team. He competed at the 2006, 2010 and 2014 Asian Games.
