= Hu Huiren =

Chinese field hockey player

Personal information
- Born: July 7, 1977 (age 49)
- Height: 1.70 m (5 ft 7 in)

Sport
- Sport: Field hockey
National team
Years	Team	Caps	Goals
–	China		-
Medal record
Men's field hockey
Representing China
Asian Games
Bronze medal – third place	2006 Doha	Team
Asia Cup
Bronze medal – third place	2009 Kuantan

Hu Huiren (Chinese: 胡汇仁; pinyin: Hú Huìrén, born 7 July 1977) is a Chinese professional field hockey player who represented China at the 2008 Summer Olympics in Beijing. The team finished last in their group, and finished 11th after beating South Africa.
