= Lee Myung-ho =

South Korean field hockey player

- Hangul: 이명호
- RR: I Myeongho
- MR: I Myŏngho

Lee Myung-ho
Medal record

Men's field hockey

Representing South Korea

Asian Games
Gold medal – first place	2006 Doha	Team
Bronze medal – third place	2014 Incheon	Team

Lee Myung-ho (born 10 December 1979) is a South Korean field hockey player who competed in the 2008 Summer Olympics and 2012 Summer Olympics.
