= Thornton McDade =

South African field hockey player

Thornton McDade (born 28 October 1980) is a South African field hockey player who competed in the 2008 Summer Olympics. and the 2012 Summer Olympics.

His current club is Old Edwardians, Johannesburg.

His preferred shirt number is "18"
