= Lloyd Norris-Jones =

South African field hockey player

Personal information
- Born: 4 February 1986 (age 40) Cape Town, South Africa
- Height: 181 cm (5 ft 11 1/2 in)
- Weight: 76 kg (168 lb)

Sport
- Sport: Field hockey
Senior career
Years	Team	Caps	Goals
2017-2019	UHC Hamburg	-	-
?	Delhi Waveriders	-	-
National team
Years	Team	Caps	Goals
?-2016	South Africa	140	(32)
Medal record
Africa Cup of Nations
Gold medal – first place	2013 Nairobi

Lloyd Norris-Jones is a South African field hockey player. At the 2012 Summer Olympics, he competed for the national team in the men's tournament.

He plays for the Delhi Waveriders in the Hockey India League. He currently plays for the UHC Hamburg.
