= Yu Yang (field hockey) =

Chinese field hockey player

Personal information
- Born: September 24, 1979 (age 46)
- Height: 1.74 m (5 ft 9 in)

Sport
- Sport: Field hockey
National team
| Years | Team | Caps | Goals |
| – | China | | - |
Medal record
Men's field hockey
Representing China
Asian Games
| Bronze medal – third place | 2006 Doha | Team |
Asia Cup
| Bronze medal – third place | 2009 Kuantan |

Yu Yang (Chinese: 于洋; pinyin: Yú Yáng, born 24 September 1979) is a Chinese men's field hockey player who participated at the 2008 Summer Olympics. He also won a silver medal at the 2006 Asian Games, where he scored 2 goals.
