= Meng Lizhi =

Chinese field hockey player

Personal information
- Born: October 31, 1974 (age 51)
- Height: 1.73 m (5 ft 8 in)

Sport
- Sport: Field hockey
National team
Years	Team	Caps	Goals
–	China		-

Meng Lizhi (Chinese: 孟立志; pinyin: Mèng Lìzhì, born 31 October 1974) is a Chinese professional field hockey player who represented China at the 2008 Summer Olympics in Beijing. The team finished last in their group, and finished 11th after beating South Africa.
