= Cha Jong-bok =

South Korean field hockey player (born 1980)

Medal record

Men's field hockey

Representing South Korea

Asian Games
| Gold medal – first place | 2006 Doha | Team |

Cha Jong-bok (born 29 January 1980) is a South Korean field hockey player who competed in the 2008 and 2012 Summer Olympics.
