= Chua Boon Huat =

Malaysian field hockey player

Personal information
- Born: 3 May 1980 Bukit Cina, Malacca, Malaysia
- Died: 1 August 2013 (aged 33) Petaling Jaya, Selangor, Malaysia
- Height: 1.80 m (5 ft 11 in)

Sport
- Sport: Field hockey
- Position: Forward, Midfielder, Defender
Senior career
Years	Team	Caps	Goals
2002	Red & White Munich HC	9	7
2003–2013	Earns & Young / Kuala Lumpur HC	-	-
2005	Teddington HC	-	-
2008	Auckland HC	-	-
National team
Years	Team	Caps	Goals
1998–2013	Malaysia	337	-
Medal record
Men's field hockey
Representing Malaysia
Asian Games
Bronze medal – third place	2002 Busan	Team
Commonwealth Games
Silver medal – second place	1998 Kuala Lumpur	Team
Bronze medal – third place	2006 Melbourne	Team
Men's Hockey Asia Cup
Bronze medal – third place	2007 Chennai	Team

Chua Boon Huat (3 May 1980 – 1 August 2013) was a field hockey player from Bukit Cina, Malacca, Malaysia. Boon Huat was one of the longest serving hockey players in Malaysia.

== Career ==
=== Club ===
He was with Kuala Lumpur Hockey Club for 10 years and part of 'the double' winners for three consecutive seasons.

In April 2002 Boon Huat take up an offer to play in the German League. During his stint, he did not disappoint his club, Red And White Munich. During his three-month stint in Germany, Boon Huat scored seven goals in nine matches, all field goals.

In 2005 he joined English Hockey League's Premier Division, Teddington Hockey Club.

His last overseas stint was in New Zealand in 2008, when he played for the Auckland club.

=== International ===
Under Paul Lissek, he made his debut as a 17-year-old with the Malaysia hockey team in the 1998 Commonwealth Games. Boon Huat who had more than 321 caps for Malaysia had played in major competitions such as the World Cup, Olympics, Champions Trophy, Commonwealth Games, Asian Games and the Asia Cup. He was also the skipper of the 2001 National Junior team which featured in the Junior World Cup in Hobart.

== Personal life and death ==
Boon Huat was a Baba-Nyonya descendant. He died in a car accident involving his car and a truck watering plants at 2.25am on 1 August 2013. The incident occurred on the Damansara–Puchong Expressway (LDP) near Kelana Jaya LRT station.
