= Shivendra Singh =

Indian field hockey player

Personal information
- Born: 9 June 1983 (age 43) Sitapur, Uttar Pradesh, India

Sport
- Sport: Field hockey
- Position: Forward
Senior career
Years	Team	Caps	Goals
–	Air India	-	-
2013 - present	Punjab Warriors	5	1
National team
Years	Team	Caps	Goals
present	India		-
Medal record
Men's field hockey
Representing India
Asian Games
Bronze medal – third place	2010 Guangzhou	Team
Asia Cup
Gold medal – first place	2007 Chennai	Team
Commonwealth Games
Silver medal – second place	2010 Delhi	Team
Champions Challenge
Bronze medal – third place	2007 Belgium	Team
Bronze medal – third place	2009 Salta	Team
Sultan Azlan Shah Cup
Gold medal – first place	2010 Malaysia	Team
- Updated on 15 February 2013

Shivendra Singh (born 9 June 1983 in Gwalior, Madhya Pradesh) is a former Indian field hockey player who played as a centre forward in the Indian team.

== Career ==
=== 2010 ===
He scored two field goals in a thrilling match against Pakistan in Commonwealth Games, Delhi which India won by 7-4.

=== Hockey India League ===
In the auction of the first edition of the Hockey India League, Singh was bought by Punjab Warriors for $27,500 with his base price being $18,500.

== Controversy ==
Shivendra was awarded a two match ban for "deliberately hitting" Pakistan's Fareed Ahmed during a FIH world cup 2010 match which India won by 4–1.
