= Gurbaj Singh =

Indian field hockey player

Personal information
- Born: 9 August 1988 (age 38)

Sport
- Sport: Field hockey
- Position: Right-half
Senior career
Years	Team	Caps	Goals
2013–2015	Delhi Waveriders	21	2
–	Punjab	-	-
–	Air India	-	-
2017–present	Ranchi Rays	10	0
National team
Years	Team	Caps	Goals
2003–	India U16		-
2006–present	India	171	(19)
Medal record
Men's field hockey
Representing India
Asian Games
Gold medal – first place	2014 Incheon	Team
Bronze medal – third place	2010 Guangzhou	Team
Asia Cup
Gold medal – first place	2007 Chennai	Team
Asian Champions Trophy
Gold medal – first place	2011 Ordos City
Commonwealth Games
Silver medal – second place	2010 Delhi	Team
Silver medal – second place	2014 Glasgow	Team
South Asian Games
Silver medal – second place	2016 Guwahati	Team
U16 Asia Cup
Gold medal – first place	2003 Dhaka

Gurbaj Singh (born 9 August 1988) represented India in men's hockey during the 2012 London Olympics.

He is a midfielder and plays in the right-half position. Gurbaj made his India debut in 2006 at the Asian Games in Doha, Qatar. He represented India at the 2010 World Cup in New Delhi, 2010 Commonwealth Games in New Delhi, the 2010 Asian Games in Guangzhou, China, and the 2012 London Olympics.

He was a member of the 2007 Asia Cup winning squad in Chennai and the silver medal-winning teams at the 2010 and 2014 Commonwealth Games.

In domestic hockey, he represents Punjab Police (employers) and Punjab state in the nationals. His earlier club was Air India.
