= Ian Haley =

South African field hockey player

Ian Haley is a South African field hockey player. At the 2012 Summer Olympics, he competed for the national team in the men's tournament.
