= Lee Seung-il (field hockey) =

South Korean field hockey player

- Hangul: 이승일
- RR: I Seungil
- MR: I Sŭngil

Lee Seung-il
Medal record

Men's field hockey

Representing South Korea

Asian Games
Gold medal – first place	2006 Doha	Team
Bronze medal – third place	2014 Incheon	Team

Asia Cup
Gold medal – first place	2022 Jakarta	

Lee Seung-il (Korean: 이승일; born December 21, 1982) is a South Korean field hockey player. At the 2012 Summer Olympics, he competed for the national team in the men's tournament.
