= Akira Ito (field hockey) =

Japanese field hockey player

Akiro Ito (born March 10, 1981) is a field hockey player from Japan, who finished in ninth place with the national squad at the 2006 Men's Hockey World Cup in Mönchengladbach. Before the start of the tournament he played 23 international matches for his native country, according to the official players list issued by the International Field Hockey Federation.
