= Yoon Sung-hoon =

South Korean field hockey player

- Hangul: 윤성훈
- RR: Yun Seonghun
- MR: Yun Sŏnghun

Yoon Sung-hoon
Medal record

Men's field hockey

Representing South Korea

Asian Games
Gold medal – first place	2006 Doha	Team
Bronze medal – third place	2014 Incheon	Team

Asia Cup
Gold medal – first place	2013 Ipoh	
Silver medal – second place	2007 Chennai	

Champions Trophy
Bronze medal – third place	2009 Melbourne	

Champions Challenge I
Gold medal – first place	2014 Kuantan	

Yoon Sung-hoon (born 16 February 1983) is a South Korean field hockey player who competed in the 2008 and 2012 Summer Olympics.
