= Jang Jong-hyun =

South Korean field hockey player

Personal information
- Born: 28 April 1984 (age 42) Damyang, South Korea

Sport
- Sport: Field hockey
National team
Years	Team	Caps	Goals
2004–	South Korea	314	(139)
Medal record
Men's field hockey
Representing South Korea
Asian Games
Gold medal – first place	2006 Doha	Team
Bronze medal – third place	2014 Incheon	Team
Bronze medal – third place	2022 Hangzhou	Team
Asia Cup
Gold medal – first place	2013 Ipoh
Gold medal – first place	2022 Jakarta
Silver medal – second place	2007 Chennai
Asian Champions Trophy
Gold medal – first place	2021 Dhaka

Jang Jong-hyun (born 28 March 1984) is a South Korean field hockey player who has played for the national team. He has competed in the 2004, 2008 and the 2012 Summer Olympics.
