= Na Yubo =

Chinese field hockey player

Personal information
- Born: July 12, 1981 (age 45)
- Height: 1.67 m (5 ft 6 in)

Sport
- Sport: Field hockey
National team
Years	Team	Caps	Goals
–	China		-
Medal record
Men's field hockey
Representing China
Asian Games
Bronze medal – third place	2006 Doha	Team

Na Yubo (Chinese: 那玉波; pinyin: Nā Yùbō, born 12 July 1981) is a Chinese professional field hockey player who represented China at the 2008 Summer Olympics in Beijing. The team finished last in their group, and finished 11th after beating South Africa.
