= Lee Nam-yong =

South Korean field hockey player

Sport
- Sport: Field hockey
National team
Years	Team	Caps	Goals
2002-	South Korea	294	(45)
Medal record
Men's field hockey
Representing South Korea
Asian Games
Gold medal – first place	2002 Busan	Team
Gold medal – first place	2006 Doha	Team
Bronze medal – third place	2014 Incheon	Team
Bronze medal – third place	2022 Hangzhou	Team
Asia Cup
Gold medal – first place	2009 Kuantan
Gold medal – first place	2013 Ipoh
Gold medal – first place	2022 Jakarta
Silver medal – second place	2007 Chennai

- Lee Nam-yong
- Hangul: 이남용
- RR: I Namyong
- MR: I Namyong

Lee Nam-yong (born 28 September 1983) is a South Korean field hockey player who has made nearly 300 appearances for the national field hockey team. He was part of the South Korean squad that competed in the 2008 and 2012 Summer Olympics.
