= You Hyo-sik =

South Korean field hockey player

Personal information
- Born: April 13, 1982 (age 44)
- Height: 171 cm (5 ft 7 1/2 in)
- Weight: 60 kg (130 lb)
Medal record
Men's field hockey
Representing South Korea
Asian Games
Gold medal – first place	2006 Doha	Team
Bronze medal – third place	2014 Incheon	Team
Asia Cup
Gold medal – first place	2009 Kuantan
Gold medal – first place	2013 Ipoh
Silver medal – second place	2007 Chennai
Bronze medal – third place	2003 Kuala Lumpur

You Hyo-Sik (born 13 April 1982) is a South Korean field hockey player who competed in the 2004 Summer Olympics, the 2008 Summer Olympics and the 2012 Summer Olympics.
