= Hong Eun-seong =

South Korean field hockey player

Personal information
- Nationality: South Korean
- Born: 3 February 1983 (age 43)
Medal record
Men's field hockey
Representing South Korea
Asian Games
| Gold medal – first place | 2006 Doha | Team |
| Bronze medal – third place | 2014 Incheon | Team |

- Hong Eun-seong
- Hangul: 홍은성
- RR: Hong Eunseong
- MR: Hong Ŭnsŏng

Hong Eun-seong (born 3 February 1983) is a South Korean field hockey player who competed in the 2008 and 2012 Summer Olympics.
