= Tushar Khandker =

Indian field hockey player

Personal information
- Born: 5 April 1985 (age 41) Jhansi, Uttar Pradesh, India

Sport
- Sport: Field hockey
- Position: Forward
Senior career
Years	Team	Caps	Goals
–	BPCL	-	-
2005 - 2008	Bangalore Lions	-	-
2013	Uttar Pradesh Wizards	5	0
National team
Years	Team	Caps	Goals
2003 - 2013	India		-
Medal record
Men's field hockey
Representing India
Asian Games
Bronze medal – third place	2010 Guangzhou	Team
Asia Cup
Gold medal – first place	2007 Chennai	Team
Commonwealth Games
Silver medal – second place	2010 Delhi	Team
- Updated on 26 January 2013

Tushar Khandker (born 5 April 1985) is an Indian field hockey coach and former field hockey player. He represented India in Men's Hockey during the 2012 London Olympics. Khandker comes from a family of hockey players as his father, uncle and elder brother played the game.

== Career ==
Tushar Khandker made his debut in for India in 2003 when he was included in the Hockey Australia Challenge Cup in which he scored in his first game. He was a part of the team that won the 2004 Junior Asia Cup and the 2007 Men's senior Asia Cup, thereby becoming the first Indian to be a part of the Asian Cups for all age groups. Tushar is an alumnus of Jamia Millia Islamia, New Delhi.

=== Hockey India League ===
During the auction of the inaugural season of the Hockey India League, Khandker was bought by the Uttar Pradesh franchise for US$14,000 with his base price being US$13,900. The Uttar Pradesh team was named Uttar Pradesh Wizards.
