= Men's Hockey Asia Cup =

Field hockey tournament

- Most recent season or competition: 2025 Men's Hockey Asia Cup
- Sport: Field hockey
- Founded: 1982; 44 years ago
- First season: 1982
- No. of teams: 8
- Confederation: AHF (Asia)
- Most recent champion: India (4th title) (2025)
- Most titles: South Korea (5 titles)
- Qualification: AHF Cup

The Men's Hockey Asia Cup is a men's international field hockey tournament organized by the Asian Hockey Federation. The winning team becomes the champion of Asia and qualifies for the FIH Hockey World Cup.

India are the defending champions, having won the 2025 edition.

The next edition is scheduled to take place in 2029. South Korea have won the most titles with five. India are the next with four titles won and Pakistan have won the tournament three times.

The hosts together with the six highest-ranked teams from the previous edition directly qualify for the tournament. They are joined by the top team from the Men's AHF Cup or the top two teams, if the host is already qualified.

== Results ==
| # | Year | Host | Final | | | Third place match | | | Teams |
| # | Year | Host | Winner | Score | Runner-up | Third place | Score | Fourth place | Teams |
|---|---|---|---|---|---|---|---|---|---|
| 1 | 1982; Details | Karachi, Pakistan | Pakistan | Round-robin | India | China | Round-robin | Malaysia | 7 |
| 2 | 1985; Details | Dhaka, Bangladesh | Pakistan | 3–2 | India | South Korea | 2–0 | Japan | 10 |
| 3 | 1989; Details | New Delhi, India | Pakistan | 2–0 | India | South Korea | 1–0 | Japan | 7 |
| 4 | 1994; Details | Hiroshima, Japan | South Korea | 1–0 | India | Pakistan | 5–2 | Malaysia | 9 |
| 5 | 1999; Details | Kuala Lumpur, Malaysia | South Korea | 5–4 | Pakistan | India | 4–2 | Malaysia | 9 |
| 6 | 2003; Details | Kuala Lumpur, Malaysia | India | 4–2 | Pakistan | South Korea | 4–2 | Japan | 8 |
| 7 | 2007; Details | Chennai, India | India | 7–2 | South Korea | Malaysia | 5–3 | Japan | 11 |
| 8 | 2009; Details | Kuantan, Malaysia | South Korea | 1–0 | Pakistan | China | 3–3 (a.e.t.) (7–6 p.s.) | Malaysia | 7 |
| 9 | 2013; Details | Ipoh, Malaysia | South Korea | 4–3 | India | Pakistan | 3–1 | Malaysia | 8 |
| 10 | 2017; Details | Dhaka, Bangladesh | India | 2–1 | Malaysia | Pakistan | 6–3 | South Korea | 8 |
| 11 | 2022; Details | Jakarta, Indonesia | South Korea | 2–1 | Malaysia | India | 1–0 | Japan | 8 |
| 12 | 2025; Details | Rajgir, India | India | 4–1 | South Korea | Malaysia | 4–1 | China | 8 |

== Summary ==
| Team | Winners | Runners-up | Third place | Fourth place |
|---|---|---|---|---|
| South Korea | 5 (1994, 1999, 2009, 2013, 2022) | 2 (2007, 2025) | 3 (1985, 1989, 2003) | 1 (2017) |
| India | 4 (2003, 2007*, 2017, 2025*) | 5 (1982, 1985, 1989*, 1994, 2013) | 2 (1999, 2022) | |
| Pakistan | 3 (1982*, 1985, 1989) | 3 (1999, 2003, 2009) | 3 (1994, 2013, 2017) | |
| Malaysia | | 2 (2017, 2022) | 2 (2007, 2025) | 5 (1982, 1994, 1999*, 2009*, 2013*) |
| China | | | 2 (1982, 2009) | 1 (2025) |
| Japan | | | | 5 (1985, 1989, 2003, 2007, 2022) |

* = hosts

== Team appearances ==
| Team | (Pakistan) 1982 | (Bangladesh) 1985 | (India) 1989 | (Japan) 1993 | (Malaysia) 1999 | (Malaysia) 2003 | (India) 2007 | (Malaysia) 2009 | (Malaysia) 2013 | (Bangladesh) 2017 | (Indonesia) 2022 | (India) 2025 | Total |
|---|---|---|---|---|---|---|---|---|---|---|---|---|---|
| Bangladesh | 5th | 6th | 7th | 6th | 6th | 8th | 7th | 7th | 7th | 6th | 6th | 6th | 12 |
| China | 3rd | 7th | 5th | 7th | 7th | 6th | 5th | 3rd | – | 7th | – | 4th | 10 |
| Chinese Taipei | – | – | – | – | – | – | – | – | 8th | – | – | 8th | 2 |
| Hong Kong | – | – | – | – | 8th | 7th | 8th | – | – | – | – | – | 3 |
| India | 2nd | 2nd | 2nd | 2nd | 3rd | 1st | 1st | 5th | 2nd | 1st | 3rd | 1st | 12 |
| Indonesia | – | – | – | – | – | – | – | – | – | – | 8th | – | 1 |
| Iran | – | 10th | – | – | – | – | – | – | – | – | – | – | 1 |
| Japan | – | 4th | 4th | 9th | 5th | 4th | 4th | 6th | 5th | 5th | 4th | 5th | 11 |
| Kazakhstan | part of the Soviet Union | | | 5th | – | – | – | – | – | – | – | 7th | 2 |
| Malaysia | 4th | 5th | 6th | 4th | 4th | 5th | 3rd | 4th | 4th | 2nd | 2nd | 3rd | 12 |
| Oman | – | – | – | – | – | – | – | – | 6th | 8th | 7th | WD | 3 |
| Pakistan | 1st | 1st | 1st | 3rd | 2nd | 2nd | 6th | 2nd | 3rd | 3rd | 5th | WD | 11 |
| Singapore | 6th | 9th | – | – | – | – | 10th | – | – | – | – | – | 3 |
| South Korea | – | 3rd | 3rd | 1st | 1st | 3rd | 2nd | 1st | 1st | 4th | 1st | 2nd | 11 |
| Sri Lanka | 7th | 8th | – | – | 9th | – | 9th | – | – | – | – | – | 4 |
| Thailand | – | – | – | 8th | – | – | 11th | – | – | – | – | – | 2 |
| Total (16) | 7 | 10 | 7 | 9 | 9 | 8 | 11 | 7 | 8 | 8 | 8 | 8 | |

== Debut of teams ==
| Year | Debutants | Total |
|---|---|---|
| 1982 | Bangladesh, China, India, Malaysia, Pakistan, Singapore, Sri Lanka | 7 |
| 1985 | Iran, Japan, South Korea | 3 |
| 1989 | —N/a | 0 |
| 1994 | Kazakhstan, Thailand | 2 |
| 1999 | Hong Kong | 1 |
| 2003 | —N/a | 0 |
| 2007 | —N/a | 0 |
| 2009 | —N/a | 0 |
| 2013 | Chinese Taipei, Oman | 2 |
| 2017 | —N/a | 0 |
| 2022 | Indonesia | 1 |
| 2025 | —N/a | 0 |
| Total | | 16 |

== See also ==
- Field hockey at the Asian Games
- Men's AHF Cup
- Men's Asian Champions Trophy
- Men's Hockey Junior Asia Cup
- Men's Hockey U18 Asia Cup
- Men's Indoor Hockey Asia Cup
- Women's Hockey Asia Cup
