= China men's national field hockey team =

China
- Association: Chinese Hockey Association
- Confederation: AHF (Asia)
- Head Coach: Michel van den Heuvel
- Assistant coach(es): Roelant Oltmans
- Captain: Chen Chongcong
Home	Away

FIH ranking
- Current: 22 ▼2 (5 November 2026)
- Highest: 10 (2009)
- Lowest: 31 (March 2015–July 2015)

Olympic Games
- Appearances: 1 (first in 2008)
- Best result: 11th (2008)

World Cup
- Appearances: 1 (first in 2018)
- Best result: 10th (2018)

Asian Games
- Appearances: 10 (first in 1982)
- Best result: (silver) 2nd (2006)

Asia Cup
- Appearances: 10 (first in 1982)
- Best result: (bronze) 3rd (1982, 2009)
Medal record
Event	1st	2nd	3rd
Asian Games	0	1	0
Asia Cup	0	0	2
Asian Champions Trophy	0	1	0
Total	0	2	2
Asian Games
Silver medal – second place	2006 Doha	Team
Asia Cup
Bronze medal – third place	1982 Karachi	
Bronze medal – third place	2009 Kuantan	
Asian Champions Trophy
Silver medal – second place	2024 Hulunbuir	

The China men's national field hockey team represents the China in international field hockey matches and tournaments.

== History ==
The team participated at the 2008 Summer Olympics in Beijing. Most of the players have traditionally been from Inner Mongolia, where the Daur people have been playing Beikou, a game similar to field hockey, for about 1,000 years. The modern game started in China in the mid-1970s. The team has since developed its talent with some overseas Chinese players became eligible to play for the team after 3 years of residence. This is evident in players such as Tim Tsung, who arrived from England 5 years ago and played for the English U16 National team for 3 years (he was signed by the national team and made his debut after a series of successful training sessions and friendly matches).

== Tournament history ==
=== Summer Olympics ===
- 2008 – 11th place

=== World Cup ===
- 2018 – 10th place

=== Asian Games ===
- 1982 – 6th place
- 1990 – 5th place
- 1994 – 8th place
- 1998 – 6th place
- 2002 – 5th place
- 2006 – (silver)
- 2010 – 5th place
- 2014 – 5th place
- 2022 – 4th place
- 2026 – 6th place

=== Asia Cup ===
- 1982 – (bronze)
- 1985 – 7th place
- 1989 – 5th place
- 1994 – 7th place
- 1999 – 7th place
- 2003 – 6th place
- 2007 – 5th place
- 2009 – (bronze)
- 2017 – 7th place
- 2025 – 4th place

=== Asian Champions Trophy ===
- 2011 – 6th place
- 2012 – 4th place
- 2013 – 4th place
- 2016 – 5th place
- 2023 – 6th place
- 2024 – (silver)
- 2026 – 5th place

=== World League ===
- 2012–13 – 23rd place
- 2014–15 – 20th place
- 2016–17 – 16th place

=== AHF Cup ===
- 2022 – Withdrew

=== Sultan Azlan Shah Cup ===
- 2007 – 7th
- 2010 – 6th
- 2014 – 4th

== Current squad ==
The following is the China roster in the men's field hockey tournament of the 2026 Asian Games.

Head coach: (Australia) Anthony Farry

1. Guan Quyang
2. Chen Qijun
3. Gao Jiesheng
5. Meng Yuanfeng (C)
6. Chen Chongcong (C)
7. Zhang Xiaojia
8. Meng Dihao
11. Chen Benhai
17. Meng Nan
18. Wang Yaqi
20. Su Rui
21. Ao Xu
23. Du Shihao
27. He Yonghua
28. Zhang Jialiang
30. Wang Weihao (GK)
33. Chen Chengfu
66. Lin Changliang
77. Zhao Yulai
99. Zhang Pengyang (GK)

== Results and fixtures ==
The following is a list of match results in the last 12 months, as well as any future matches that have been scheduled.

Win Draw Loss Fixture

=== 2026 ===
01 March 2026 WC Qualifiers GS	Pakistan	5–4	China	Ismailia, Egypt
18:00	Sufyan 8'; Rana 20'; Ammad 21'; Mahmood 35'; Waleed 43'	Report	Du 16', 39'; Guan 42'; Zhang. X 49'	Stadium: Suez Canal Stadium

02 March 2026 WC Qualifiers GS	Austria	1–1	China	Ismailia, Egypt
15:00	Frey 27'	Report	Chen. B 31'	Stadium: Suez Canal Stadium

04 March 2026 WC Qualifiers GS	Malaysia	5–4	China	Ismailia, Egypt
15:00	Fi. Saari 5', 43'; Rozemi 28'; Faiz 36'; Fa. Saari 47'	Report	Wang Y. 6'; Zhao 16', 51'; Chen B. 11'	Stadium: Suez Canal Stadium

06 March 2026 WC Qualifiers Crossover	China	Walkover (Note: The United States withdrew after two matches because of an official advisory from the US State Department due to the 2026 Iran War.)	United States	Ismailia, Egypt
09:00		Report		Stadium: Suez Canal Stadium

07 March 2026 WC Qualifiers Fifth and sixth place	Egypt	3–4	China	Ismailia, Egypt
11:00	Adel 31'; Ragab 36'; Kamal 41'	Report	Du 44'; Su 53'; Chen Q. 56'; Ao 59'	Stadium: Suez Canal Stadium

18 September 2026 Asian Games Pool B	China	2–0	Oman	Kakamigahara, Japan
09:00	Gao 23'; Du 35'	Report		Stadium: Gifu Prefectural Green Stadium

22 September 2026 Asian Games Pool B	Thailand	1–8	China	Kakamigahara, Japan
13:00	Chaimanee 53'	Report	Gao 12', 44', 56'; Chen. B 13'; Jialiang 30'; He 40', 52'; Zhao 55'	Stadium: Gifu Prefectural Green Stadium

24 September 2026 Asian Games Pool B	China	0–3	Pakistan	Kakamigahara, Japan
19:00		Report	Mahmood 19'; Khan 24'; Shahid 28'	Stadium: Gifu Prefectural Green Stadium

26 September 2026 Asian Games Pool B	Uzbekistan	1–3	China	Kakamigahara, Japan
19:00	Abboskhonov 5'	Report	Zhao 10', 36'; Gao 22'	Stadium: Gifu Prefectural Green Stadium

28 September 2026 Asian Games Pool B	China	0–5	Malaysia	Kakamigahara, Japan
09:00		Report	Fi. Saari 13'; Anuar 22'; Hamsani 24'; Fa. Saari 43'; Azrai 59'	Stadium: Gifu Prefectural Green Stadium

1 October 2026 Asian Games 5/8 Classification	China	7–1	Bangladesh	Kakamigahara, Japan
14:00	Jialiang 2', 44'; Yulai 4'; Chen. B 24', 56', 59'; Gao 32'	Report	Hasan 30'	Stadium: Gifu Prefectural Green Stadium

3 October 2026 Asian Games 5th place match	Japan	5–0	China	Kakamigahara, Japan
14:00	Matsumoto 21'; Kawabe 21', 60'; Ooka 48'; Yamasaki 60'	Report		Stadium: Gifu Prefectural Green Stadium

27 October 2026 ACT Group Stage	Malaysia	5–4	China	Jalandhar, India
13:00	Azrai 4', 14'; Anuar 14'; Fa. Saari 34'; Kamaruddin 35'	Report	Wang 11'; Ne 12'; Chen. B 27', 44'	Stadium: Surjit Hockey Stadium

29 October 2026 ACT Group Stage	India	5–2	China	Jalandhar, India
19:00	Sukhjeet 12', 34'; Harmanpreet 27', 31'; Jugraj 47'	Report	Yang 26'; Chen. C 36'	Stadium: Surjit Hockey Stadium

30 October 2026 ACT Group Stage	South Korea	2–1	China	Jalandhar, India
16:45	Kim. Y 35'; Kim. J 36'	Report	Chen. C 8'	Stadium: Surjit Hockey Stadium

1 November 2026 ACT Group Stage	China	2–2	Japan	Jalandhar, India
16:45	Zhang. J 8'; Chen. B 60+'	Report	Fujishima 48'; Nagai 48'	Stadium: Surjit Hockey Stadium

2 November 2026 ACT Group Stage	China	1–1	Bangladesh	Jalandhar, India
14:30	Chen. B 2'	Report	Ashraful 38'	Stadium: Surjit Hockey Stadium

4 November 2026 ACT 5th place match	China	3–1	Bangladesh	Mohali, India
14:00	Zhao 10'; Wang 18'; Chen. C 22'	Report	Rahman 48'	Stadium: Olympian Balbir Singh Senior International Hockey Stadium

== See also ==
- China women's national field hockey team
