= 2026 Men's Asian Champions Trophy =

Asian field hockey tournament

Tournament details
- Host country: India
- City: Jalandhar and Mohali, Punjab
- Dates: 27 October – 5 November
- Teams: 6 (from 1 confederation)
- Venues: Surjit Hockey Stadium; Olympian Balbir Singh Senior International Hockey Stadium

Final positions
- Champions: India (6th title)
- Runner-up: Japan
- Third place: Malaysia

Tournament statistics
- Matches played: 20
- Goals scored: 107 (5.35 per match)
- Top scorer: (India) Harmanpreet Singh (10 goals)
- Best player: (India) Harmanpreet Singh
- Best young player: (Malaysia) Azimuddin Kamaruddin
- Best goalkeeper: (India) Krishan Bahadur Pathak

The 2026 Men's Asian Champions Trophy (officially known as Hero Asian Champions Trophy Punjab 2026 for sponsorship reasons) was the 9th edition of the Men's Asian Champions Trophy, an international field hockey tournament organized by the Asian Hockey Federation (AHF). The tournament was held from 27 October to 5 November 2026 across two cities in Punjab, India. India defeated Japan in the final to win a record sixth title and complete a hat-trick of titles, having won the 2023 and 2024 editions.

It marked the first time that the state of Punjab hosted the competition.

== Background and organisation ==
On 14 September 2026, the Chief Minister of Punjab, Bhagwant Mann, officially launched the tournament logo alongside members of Hockey India and the Asian Hockey Federation at the Municipal Corporation building in Mohali.

The Government of Punjab approved a total budget of ₹25.40 crore (US$2.7 million), including ₹22.96 crore (US$2.5 million) for infrastructure development and upgrading facilities across both venues. The state government also announced that spectator admission to all tournament matches would be entirely free of cost.

=== Pakistan's exit ===
Despite political tensions halting bilateral sports between India and Pakistan, the Government of India approved the participation of the Pakistan team in line with multilateral tournament guidelines and the Olympic Charter. The group match between India and Pakistan was scheduled for 1 November 2026 in Jalandhar, coinciding with Punjab Day. However, Pakistan withdrew from the tournament, raising security concerns and sought a neutral venue which was rejected by the AHF. Bangladesh was named as Pakistan's replacement.

== Venues ==
The tournament was shared between two cities in Punjab. Olympian Surjit Hockey Stadium in Jalandhar staged the opening ceremony and all round-robin league fixtures, while the Olympian Balbir Singh (Senior) International Hockey Stadium in Mohali hosted the semi-finals, medal matches, and closing ceremony.

| (India) Jalandhar | 2026 Men's Asian Champions Trophy is located in Punjab | (India) Mohali |
| Surjit Hockey Stadium | 2026 Men's Asian Champions Trophy is located in Punjab | Balbir Singh (Senior) International Hockey Stadium |
| Capacity: 7,000 | 2026 Men's Asian Champions Trophy is located in Punjab | Capacity: 13,648 |

== Teams ==
Six nations, including hosts India, competed in the tournament.

| Team | Appearance | Last appearance | Previous best performance |
|---|---|---|---|
| Bangladesh | 2nd | 2021 | 5th (2021) |
| China | 7th | 2024 | Runners-up (2024) |
| India | 9th | 2024 | Champions (2011, 2016, 2018, 2023, 2024) |
| Japan | 9th | 2024 | Runners-up (2013, 2021) |
| Malaysia | 8th | 2024 | Runners-up (2023) |
| South Korea | 7th | 2024 | Champions (2021) |

== Squads ==
Bangladesh

Head Coach: (Germany) Gerhard Rach

2. Ashraful Islam (C)
3. Farhad Ahmed
4. Khaled Rakin
6. Roman Sarkar
7. Rashel Mahmud
9. Md Abdullah
10. Puskar Khisa
11. Rakibul Hasan
12. Obidul Joy
13. Rezaul Babu
16. Md Uddin
17. Amirul Islam
18. Hozifa Hossain
21. Ashraful Shad (GK)
22. Biplob Kujur (GK)
27. Mahbub Hossain
30. Tayab Ali
75. Md Shohanur Rahman
China

Head Coach: (China) Liu Xiantang

1. Huanyu Wu (GK)
5. Yuanfeng Meng (C)
6. Chongcong Chen (C)
7. Xiaojia Zhang
8. Boran Li
10. Moda Ne
11. Benhai Chen
12. Jiebin Xu
15. Jianjun Wu
16. Minjian Sun
17. Xiangkai Kong
18. Yaqi Wang
19. Hongliang Teng
20. Rui Su
24. Pengfei Li
25. Jingwen Deng
28. Jialiang Zhang
56. Peng Yang
77. Yulai Zhao
99. Pengyang Zhang (GK)
India

Head Coach: (South Africa) Craig Fulton

4. Jarmanpreet Singh
5. Abhishek
8. Hardik Singh
9. Dilpreet Singh
11. Mandeep Singh
12. Krishan Bahadur Pathak (GK)
13. Harmanpreet Singh (C)
18. Nilakanta Sharma
19. Aditya Lalage
30. Amit Rohidas
31. Jugraj Singh
32. Vivek Prasad
34. Sukhjeet Singh
38. Amandeep Lakra
70. Sanjay
77. Suraj Karkera (GK)
78. Rajinder Singh
99. Shilanand Lakra

Reserves:

40. Vishnukant Singh
97. Angad Bir Singh
Japan

Head Coach: (Japan) Ippei Fujimoto

2. Shota Yamada
5. Seren Tanaka
7. Jun Watanabe
11. Kazumasa Matsumoto
12. Yuma Nagai
13. Manabu Yamashita
14. Raiki Fujishima (C)
15. Ken Nagayoshi
16. Hiro Saito
17. Ren Kashiwagi
18. Tsubasa Tanaka
19. Ryoma Ooka
23. Yusuke Kawamura
24. Kisho Kuroda (GK)
26. Motoya Yamanaka
27. Haruki Ochiai
29. Takumi Kitagawa (GK)
37. Kentaro Fukuda
Malaysia

Head coach: (South Africa) Brendon Carolan

6. Marhan Jalil (C)
7. Fitri Saari
10. Faizal Saari
11. Akhimullah Anuar
12. Adam Johari
15. Shello Silverius
16. Zaimi Mat Deris (GK)
18. Faiz Jali
20. Ashran Hamsani
21. Hafizuddin Othman (GK)
23. Abu Kamal Azrai
24. Aiman Rozemi
26. Muhajir Abdu Rauf
27. Shafiq Hassan
29. Amirul Azahar
30. Faris Harizan
31. Azimuddin Kamaruddin
32. Aminuddin Mohd Zain
35. Andywalfian Jeffrynus
46. Nur Aqilrullah Che
South Korea

Head coach: (South Korea) Lim Jung-bin

1. Kim Jae-hyeon (GK)
2. Park Geun-woo
3. Jeong Jun-seong
6. Go Soung Hoon
7. Kim Jae-ho
9. Son Da-in
10. Kim Yong Bok (C)
11. Chun Semin
15. Song Jeong-seob
16. Sohn Tae-min (GK)
17. Yoo Hyoguk
18. Kong Yoon-ho
20. Om Jun-young
22. Kwon Ye-chan
23. Song Hae-seong
24. Bae Soung-min
31. Han Sang-jun
33. Kim Dae-hyun
40. Choi Ga-jin
47. Kim Dong-geon

== Round-robin ==
All times are local (UTC+5:30)

| Pos | Team | Pld | W | D | L | GF | GA | GD | Pts | Qualification |
|---|---|---|---|---|---|---|---|---|---|---|
| 1 | India (H) | 5 | 5 | 0 | 0 | 34 | 5 | +29 | 15 | Semi-finals |
| 2 | Japan | 5 | 3 | 1 | 1 | 9 | 9 | 0 | 10 | Semi-finals |
| 3 | Malaysia | 5 | 3 | 0 | 2 | 17 | 12 | +5 | 9 | Semi-finals |
| 4 | South Korea | 5 | 2 | 0 | 3 | 10 | 15 | −5 | 6 | Semi-finals |
| 5 | China | 5 | 0 | 2 | 3 | 10 | 15 | −5 | 2 | Fifth place match |
| 6 | Bangladesh | 5 | 0 | 1 | 4 | 2 | 26 | −24 | 1 | Fifth place match |

Source: FIH
Rules for classification: 1) points; 2) matches won; 3) goal difference; 4) goals for; 5) head-to-head result; 6) field goals for.
(H) Hosts

27 October 2026
13:00

| Malaysia | 5–4 | China |
|---|---|---|
| Azrai 4', 14'; Anuar 14'; Fa. Saari 34'; Kamaruddin 35' | Report | Wang 11'; Ne 12'; Chen. B 27', 44' |

Surjit Hockey Stadium
Umpires:
Hideki Kinoshita (JPN)
Gurbaj Singh (IND)

27 October 2026
15:15

| Japan | 3–2 | South Korea |
|---|---|---|
| Fukuda 14'; Ooka 36'; Matsumoto 52' | Report | Han 15'; Jeong 59' |

Surjit Hockey Stadium
Umpires:
Mohammad Shahbaz Ali (BAN)
Anand Dangi (IND)

27 October 2026
19:00

| India | 13–0 | Bangladesh |
|---|---|---|
| Harmanpreet 2', 44'; Mandeep 3', 10', 54'; Lakra 15'; Abhishek 18'; Nilakanta 26'; Dilpreet 43', 44'; Jugraj 46'; Hardik 60', 60' | Report |

Surjit Hockey Stadium
Umpires:
Chi Gang (CHN)
Peter Kabaso (KEN)

29 October 2026
14:30

| Malaysia | 3–1 | South Korea |
|---|---|---|
| Kamaruddin 10'; Anuar 36'; Fa. Saari 50' | Report | Song. H 31' |

Surjit Hockey Stadium
Umpires:
Juan Pedro Rodriguez (ARG)
Mohammad Shahbaz Ali (BAN)

29 October 2026
16:45

| Bangladesh | 0–1 | Japan |
|---|---|---|
| | Report | Fujishima 40' |

Surjit Hockey Stadium
Umpires:
Anand Dangi (IND)
Deekshith Narayana (IND)

29 October 2026
19:00

| India | 5–2 | China |
|---|---|---|
| Sukhjeet 12', 34'; Harmanpreet 27', 31'; Jugraj 47' | Report | Yang 26'; Chen. C 36' |

Surjit Hockey Stadium
Umpires:
Thipak Kanabathu (MAS)
Kim Jiyong (KOR)

30 October 2026
14:30

| Bangladesh | 1–6 | Malaysia |
|---|---|---|
| Amirul 26' | Report | Azrai 14', 22'; Anuar 29'; Kamaruddin 32'; Silverius 33'; Rozemi 50' |

Surjit Hockey Stadium
Umpires:
Kim Jiyong (KOR)
Chi Gang (CHN)

30 October 2026
16:45

| South Korea | 2–1 | China |
|---|---|---|
| Kim. Y 35'; Kim. J 36' | Report | Chen. C 8' |

Surjit Hockey Stadium
Umpires:
Gurbaj Singh (IND)
Deekshith Narayana (IND)

30 October 2026
19:00

| Japan | 1–4 | India |
|---|---|---|
| Yamada 15' | Report | Abhishek 11', 51'; Harmanpreet 47'; Vishnukant 56' |

Surjit Hockey Stadium
Umpires:
Peter Kabaso (KEN)
Juan Pedro Rodriguez (ARG)

1 November 2026
14:30

| South Korea | 5–0 | Bangladesh |
|---|---|---|
| Park 7', 34'; Son 17', 32', 51' | Report |

Surjit Hockey Stadium
Umpires:
Gurbaj Singh (IND)
Thipak Kanabathu (MAS)

1 November 2026
16:45

| China | 2–2 | Japan |
|---|---|---|
| Zhang. J 8'; Chen. B 60+' | Report | Fujishima 48'; Nagai 48' |

Surjit Hockey Stadium
Umpires:
Kim Jiyong (KOR)
Mohammad Shahbaz Ali (BAN)

1 November 2026
19:00

| Malaysia | 2–4 | India |
|---|---|---|
| Anuar 25'; Silverius 60' | Report | Harmanpreet 3', 33', 58'; Sukhjeet 43' |

Surjit Hockey Stadium
Umpires:
Juan Pedro Rodriguez (ARG)
Hideki Kinoshita (JPN)

2 November 2026
14:30

| China | 1–1 | Bangladesh |
|---|---|---|
| Chen. B 2' | Report | Ashraful 38' |

Surjit Hockey Stadium
Umpires:
Deekshith Narayana (IND)
Thipak Kanabathu (MAS)

2 November 2026
16:45

| Japan | 2–1 | Malaysia |
|---|---|---|
| Fukuda 24', 54' | Report | Azrai 10' |

Surjit Hockey Stadium
Umpires:
Anand Dangi (IND)
Peter Kabaso (KEN)

2 November 2026
19:00

| India | 8–0 | South Korea |
|---|---|---|
| Dilpreet 8', 40'; Jugraj 11'; Harmanpreet 15'; Lakra 33'; Sukhjeet 34'; Sanjay 36'; Angad 60' | Report |

Surjit Hockey Stadium
Umpires:
Chi Gang (CHN)
Hideki Kinoshita (JPN)

== Fifth place match ==
4 November 2026
14:00

| China | 3–1 | Bangladesh |
|---|---|---|
| Zhao 10'; Wang 18'; Chen. C 22' | Report | Rahman 48' |

Olympian Balbir Singh Senior International Hockey Stadium
Umpires:
Deekshith Narayana (IND)
Kim Jiyong (KOR)

== Medal round ==
=== Bracket ===
Semi-finals
4 November
India | 8
South Korea | 1
4 November
Japan (p.s.o.) | 0 (5)
Malaysia | 0 (3)

Gold medal match
5 November
India | 4
Japan | 1
Bronze medal match
5 November
South Korea | 2
Malaysia | 5

=== Semi-finals ===
4 November 2026
16:30

| Japan | 0–0 | Malaysia |
|---|---|---|
| | Report |
Penalties
| Matsumoto (penalty shoot-out scored); Ooka (penalty shoot-out scored); T. Tanaka (penalty shoot-out scored); Ochiai (penalty shoot-out scored); S. Tanaka (penalty shoot-out scored) | 5–3 | (penalty shoot-out missed) Fa. Saari; (penalty shoot-out scored) Rozemi; (penalty shoot-out scored) Silverius; (penalty shoot-out scored) Azrai |

Olympian Balbir Singh Senior International Hockey Stadium
Umpires:
Peter Kabaso (KEN)
Juan Pedro Rodriguez (ARG)

4 November 2026
19:00

| India | 8–1 | South Korea |
|---|---|---|
| Lakra 4', 13'; Harmanpreet 9'; Sukhjeet 21'; Dilpreet 21', 25'; Angad 36'; Prasad 54' | Report | Han 9' |

Olympian Balbir Singh Senior International Hockey Stadium
Umpires:
Hideki Kinoshita (JPN)
Mohammad Shahbaz Ali (BAN)

=== Bronze medal match ===
5 November 2026
16:00

| South Korea | 2–5 | Malaysia |
|---|---|---|
| Park 5'; Chun 13' | Report | Fi. Saari 2'; Fa. Saari 34'; Azrai 45', 50'; Jalil 58' |

Olympian Balbir Singh Senior International Hockey Stadium
Umpires:
Hideki Kinoshita (JPN)
Anand Dangi (IND)

=== Gold medal match ===
5 November 2026
19:00

| India | 4–1 | Japan |
|---|---|---|
| Lakra 42'; Dilpreet 48'; Jugraj 53'; Sukhjeet 54' | Report | Matsumoto 3' |

Olympian Balbir Singh Senior International Hockey Stadium
Umpires:
Juan Pedro Rodriguez (ARG)
Peter Kabaso (KEN)

== Statistics ==
=== Final rankings ===
| Pos | Team |
|---|---|
| 1st place, gold medalist(s) | India (H) |
| 2nd place, silver medalist(s) | Japan |
| 3rd place, bronze medalist(s) | Malaysia |
| 4 | South Korea |
| 5 | China |
| 6 | Bangladesh |

Source: FIH
(H) Host

=== Goalscorers ===
There were 107 goals scored in 20 matches, for an average of 5.35 goals per match.

10 goals

- (India) Harmanpreet Singh

7 goals

- (India) Dilpreet Singh
- (Malaysia) Abu Kamal Azrai

6 goals

- (India) Sukhjeet Singh

5 goals

- (India) Shilanand Lakra

4 goals

- (China) Benhai Chen
- (India) Jugraj Singh
- (Malaysia) Akhimullah Anuar

3 goals

- (China) Chongcong Chen
- (India) Abhishek
- (India) Mandeep Singh
- (Japan) Kentaro Fukuda
- (Malaysia) Azimuddin Kamaruddin
- (Malaysia) Faizal Saari
- (South Korea) Park Geun-woo
- (South Korea) Son Da-in

2 goals

- (China) Yaqi Wang
- (India) Angad Bir Singh
- (India) Hardik Singh
- (Japan) Raiki Fujishima
- (Japan) Kazumasa Matsumoto
- (Malaysia) Shello Silverius
- (South Korea) Han Sang-jun

1 goal

- (Bangladesh) Amirul Islam
- (Bangladesh) Ashraful Islam
- (Bangladesh) Md Shohanur Rahman
- (China) Moda Ne
- (China) Yaqi Wang
- (China) Peng Yang
- (China) Jialiang Zhang
- (China) Yulai Zhao
- (India) Vivek Sagar Prasad
- (India) Sanjay
- (India) Nilakanta Sharma
- (India) Vishnukant Singh
- (Japan) Yuma Nagai
- (Japan) Ryoma Ooka
- (Japan) Shota Yamada
- (Malaysia) Marhan Jalil
- (Malaysia) Aiman Rozemi
- (Malaysia) Fitri Saari
- (South Korea) Chun Semin
- (South Korea) Jeong Jun-seong
- (South Korea) Kim Jae-ho
- (South Korea) Kim Yong Bok
- (South Korea) Song Hae-seong

Source: FIH

== Controversy ==
A hockey-themed selfie point installed at Surjit Hockey Stadium in Jalandhar for the 2026 Asian Champions Trophy depicted a player striking the ball with the rounded back of the stick, an illegal action known as a back-stick foul. The error prompted criticism from former hockey players, veteran coach Baldev Singh and Olympian Hardeep Singh, who questioned whether knowledgeable players or coaches had reviewed the promotional material before its approval. The incident highlighted concerns about technical accuracy in publicity material for an international sporting event.

== See also ==
- 2026 Women's Asian Champions Trophy
