= Field hockey at the 2026 Asian Games – Men's tournament =

Men's field hockey at the 2026 Asian Games

Tournament details
- Host country: Japan
- City: Kakamigahara, Gifu Prefecture
- Dates: 18 September – 3 October 2026
- Teams: 12 (from 1 confederation)
- Venue: Kawasaki Juko Stadium

Final positions
- Champions: India (5th title)
- Runner-up: Malaysia
- Third place: Pakistan

Tournament statistics
- Matches played: 40
- Goals scored: 271 (6.78 per match)
- Top scorer(s): (India) Harmanpreet Singh (Pakistan) Sufyan Khan (12 goals)

The men's field hockey tournament at the 2026 Asian Games (officially the 20th Asian Games and also known as Aichi-Nagoya 2026) was the 18th edition of the field hockey event for men at the Asian Games. It was held alongside the women's tournament at the Kawasaki Juko Stadium, also known as Gifu Prefectural Green Stadium, in Kakamigahara, Japan. The men's tournament started from 18 September (one day before the opening ceremony of the 2026 Asian Games) and concluded on 3 October 2026.

India were the defending champions and successfully retained their title after defeating Malaysia.

India secured the direct qualification to the 2028 Summer Olympics.

Pakistan defeated South Korea to clinch the bronze with a first podium finish since 2014.

It was the first time India and Malaysia clashed in the Asian Games final. It was also the first time India had retained their title.

== Venue ==
For information about ticketing and directions to the venue, see External link(s).

(Japan) Kakamigahara
Kawasaki Juko Stadium
Capacity: 1,630
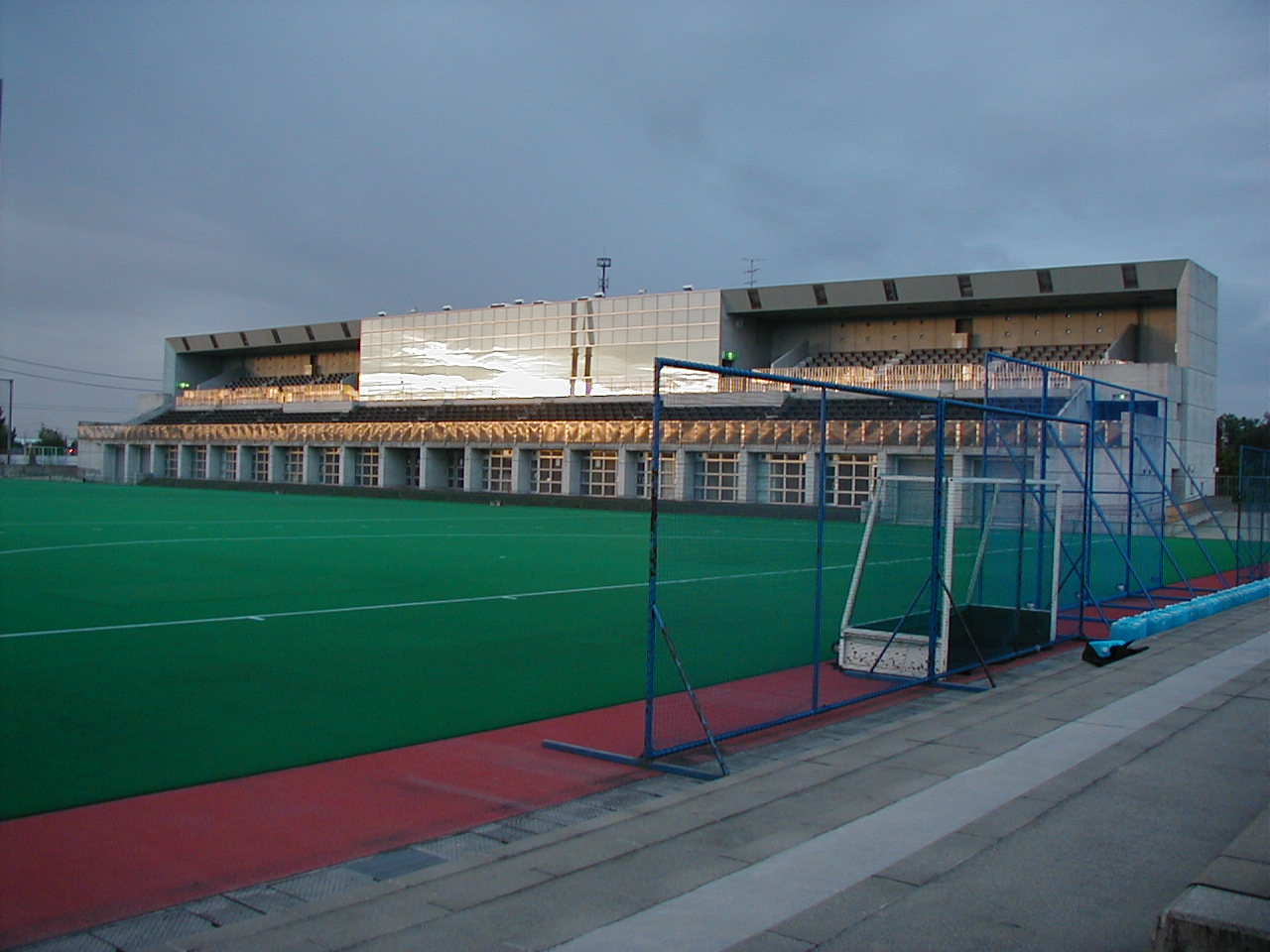

== Qualification ==
Mode of Qualification	Date	Hosts	Berths	Qualified teams
Host country	25 September 2016	—N/a	1	Japan
2022 Asian Games	24 September – 6 October 2023	(China) Hangzhou	5	China; India; Malaysia; Pakistan; South Korea
2026 Asian Games Qualifier	2 April – 10 April 2026	(Thailand) Bangkok	6	Bangladesh; ~~Chinese Taipei~~; Indonesia; Oman; Sri Lanka; Uzbekistan; Thailand
Total			12	

== Preliminary round ==
All times are local (UTC+9)

=== Pool A ===
Pos	Team	Pld	W	D	L	GF	GA	GD	Pts	Qualification
1	India	5	5	0	0	49	4	+45	15	Semi-finals
2	South Korea	5	4	0	1	20	10	+10	12	Semi-finals
3	Japan (H)	5	3	0	2	29	7	+22	9	Fifth place classification
4	Bangladesh	5	2	0	3	9	23	−14	6	Fifth place classification
5	Sri Lanka	5	1	0	4	6	38	−32	3	Ninth place game
6	Indonesia	5	0	0	5	6	37	−31	0	Eleventh place game

Source: FIH
Rules for classification: 1) points; 2) matches won; 3) goal difference; 4) goals for; 5) head-to-head result; 6) field goals for.
(H) Hosts

18 September 2026
11:00

South Korea	5–0	Bangladesh
Bae 21'; Oh 21'; Lee G. 30'; Yang 32'; Sim 58'	Report

Gifu Prefectural Green Stadium
Umpires:
Lim Hong-Zhen (SGP)
James Unkles (AUS)

20 September 2026
15:00

India	13–1	Indonesia
Lakra 6', 35'; Abhishek 12'; Dilpreet 18', 19', 37', 49'; Rajinder 19'; Mandeep 21'; Harmanpreet 28'; Sukhjeet 38', 48'; Jugraj 46'	Report	Al Ardh 33'

Gifu Prefectural Green Stadium
Umpires:
Liu Xiaoying (CHN)
Zhou Fuyi (CHN)

20 September 2026
17:00

Japan	9–0	Sri Lanka
Kimura 15'; Yamasaki 18', 29', 46', 58'; Fujishima 25'; Kawabe 48'; S. Tanaka 51'; Ooka 55'	Report

Gifu Prefectural Green Stadium
Umpires:
Mohammad Shahbaz Ali (BAN)
Haroon Rashid (PAK)

22 September 2026
11:00

Indonesia	0–5	South Korea
	Report	Lim Do. 11', 23', 40', 42'; Kim. H 33'

Gifu Prefectural Green Stadium
Umpires:
Haroon Rashid (PAK)
Hideki Kinoshita (JPN)

22 September 2026
17:00

Japan	6–1	Bangladesh
Kawabe 1', 58'; Yamasaki 6'; Kimura 15'; Watanabe 29'; Matsumoto 41'	Report	Rakin 44'

Gifu Prefectural Green Stadium
Umpires:
Sean Rapaport (RSA)
Mazin Al-Shukaili (OMA)

22 September 2026
19:00

India	16–1	Sri Lanka
Mandeep 5'; Jugraj 10', 22', 42', 53'; Abhishek 11', 17', 49'; Harmanpreet 16', 45'; Sukhjeet 29'; Dilpreet 30', 38', 55'; Manpreet 31'; Prasad 36'	Report	Rathnayake 50'

Gifu Prefectural Green Stadium
Umpires:
James Unkles (AUS)
Khalid Hussain (HKG)

24 September 2026
11:00

Bangladesh	5–1	Sri Lanka
Am. Islam 8', 27'; As. Islam 16', 54'; Hossain 43'	Report	Weerappuli 18'

Gifu Prefectural Green Stadium
Umpires:
Daulet Urmanov (KAZ)
Sean Rapaport (RSA)

24 September 2026
15:00

South Korea	2–8	India
Kim J. 42'; Kim Y. 52'	Report	Lakra 4'; Sukhjeet 10'; Harmanpreet 11'; Abhishek 15', 38'; Dilpreet 26', 32'; Rajinder 60'

Gifu Prefectural Green Stadium
Umpires:
Coen van Bunge (NED)
Rawi Anbananthan (MAS)

24 September 2026
17:00

Indonesia	1–12	Japan
Wibowo 20'	Report	Kimura 2'; Takade 4'; Ooka 5'; Fujishima 9', 11', 34'; Kawabe 15'; Matsumoto 23'; K. Tanaka 41'; T. Tanaka 51', 58'; Yamasaki 53'

Gifu Prefectural Green Stadium
Umpires:
Mazin Al-Shukaili (OMA)
You Hyo-sik (KOR)

26 September 2026
11:00

Bangladesh	3–1	Indonesia
Am. Islam 11', 31'; Mahmud 37'	Report	Al Ardh 48'

Gifu Prefectural Green Stadium
Umpires:
Haroon Rashid (PAK)
Coen van Bunge (NED)

26 September 2026
15:00

Sri Lanka	0–5	South Korea
		Park 29'; Son 50'; Lim Do. 54', 58'; Yang 55'

Gifu Prefectural Green Stadium
Umpires:
Mazin Al-Shukaili (OMA)
Deepak Joshi (IND)

26 September 2026
17:00

Japan	0–2	India
	Report	Abhishek 15'; Harmanpreet 40'

Gifu Prefectural Green Stadium
Umpires:
Lim Hong-Zhen (SGP)
Sean Rapaport (RSA)

28 September 2026
11:00

Sri Lanka	4–3	Indonesia
Ranasingha 11'; Batuvita 23'; Fernando 51'; Sudusinghe 58'	Report	Muhamad 20'; Prastyo 44', 50'

Gifu Prefectural Green Stadium
Umpires:
Hideki Kinoshita (JPN)
Zhou Fuyi (CHN)

28 September 2026
17:45

South Korea	3–2	Japan
Yang 29', 42'; Rim 52'	Report	Yamasaki 4'; Fujishima 60'

Gifu Prefectural Green Stadium
Umpires:
Rawi Anbananthan (MAS)
Haroon Rashid (PAK)

28 September 2026
19:30

India	10–0	Bangladesh
Abhishek 3'; Jugraj 22'; Harmanpreet 27', 40', 45'; Sukhjeet 32'; Lakra 44', 45'; Sanjay 59'; Mandeep 60'	Report

Gifu Prefectural Green Stadium
Umpires:
Daulet Urmanov (KAZ)
Mazin Al-Shukaili (OMA)

=== Pool B ===
Pos	Team	Pld	W	D	L	GF	GA	GD	Pts	Qualification
1	Malaysia	5	5	0	0	34	4	+30	15	Semi-finals
2	Pakistan	5	4	0	1	28	8	+20	12	Semi-finals
3	China	5	3	0	2	13	10	+3	9	Fifth place classification
4	Thailand	5	2	0	3	5	28	−23	6	Fifth place classification
5	Uzbekistan	5	1	0	4	6	20	−14	3	Ninth place game
6	Oman	5	0	0	5	4	20	−16	0	Eleventh place game

Source: FIH
Rules for classification: 1) points; 2) matches won; 3) goal difference; 4) goals for; 5) head-to-head result; 6) field goals for.

18 September 2026
09:00

China	2–0	Oman
Gao 23'; Du 35'	Report

Gifu Prefectural Green Stadium
Umpires:
Coen van Bunge (NED)
Sean Rapaport (RSA)

20 September 2026
13:00

Malaysia	7–0	Uzbekistan
Sumantri 11'; Fa. Saari 15', 24', 43'; Kamaruddin 36'; Azrai 59'; Jali 60'	Report

Gifu Prefectural Green Stadium
Umpires:
Khalid Hussain (HKG)
Hideki Kinoshita (JPN)

20 September 2026
19:00

Pakistan	9–0	Thailand
Shakeel 8'; Butt 12'; Nadeem 20', 37', 43'; Khan 22', 23'; Rana 31'; Shahid 34'	Report

Gifu Prefectural Green Stadium
Umpires:
Akalanka Ishan Kumara (SRI)
You Hyo-sik (KOR)

22 September 2026
09:00

Pakistan	5–1	Uzbekistan
Ammad 18'; Khan 33', 57'; Rehman 40'; Mahmood 45'	Report	Salimjonov 30+'

Gifu Prefectural Green Stadium
Umpires:
Zhou Fuyi (CHN)
Coen van Bunge (NED)

22 September 2026
13:00

Thailand	1–8	China
Chaimanee 53'	Report	Gao 12', 44', 56'; Chen 13'; Zhang 30'; He 40', 52'; Zhao 55'

Gifu Prefectural Green Stadium
Umpires:
Rawi Anbananthan (MAS)
Daulet Urmanov (UZB)

22 September 2026
15:00

Malaysia	7–0	Oman
Fa. Saari 3', 43'; Rozemi 17'; Azrai 24', 57'; Silverius 30'; Anuar 57'	Report

Gifu Prefectural Green Stadium
Umpires:
Deepak Joshi (IND)
Mohammad Shahbaz Ali (BAN)

24 September 2026
09:00

Thailand	0–10	Malaysia
	Report	Fa. Saari 18', 35'; Abdu Rauf 20'; Azrai 21', 41'; Mohd Zain 28'; Hamsani 35'; Silverius 55'; Jali 59'; Anuar 60'

Gifu Prefectural Green Stadium
Umpires:
Khalid Hussain (HKG)
Lim Hong-Zhen (SGP)

24 September 2026
13:00

Oman	2–3	Uzbekistan
Al-Hasni 38'; Al-Fazari 45+'	Report	Husanov 36', 53'; Khakimov 54'

Gifu Prefectural Green Stadium
Umpires:
Mohammad Shahbaz Ali (BAN)
James Unkles (AUS)

24 September 2026
19:00

China	0–3	Pakistan
	Report	Mahmood 19'; Khan 24'; Shahid 28'

Gifu Prefectural Green Stadium
Umpires:
Hideki Kinoshita (JPN)
Deepak Joshi (IND)

26 September 2026
09:00

Oman	0–1	Thailand
	Report	Juntakian 57'

Gifu Prefectural Green Stadium
Umpires:
Akalanka Ishan Kumara (SRI)
Kim Yoon-seon (KOR)

26 September 2026
13:00

Malaysia	5–4	Pakistan
Silverius 5', 56'; Fa. Saari 23'; Fi. Saari 45'; Azrai 57'	Report	Khan 3', 39', 43', 46'

Gifu Prefectural Green Stadium
Umpires:
You Hyo-sik (KOR)
James Unkles (AUS)

26 September 2026
19:00

Uzbekistan	1–3	China
Abboskhonov 5'	Report	Zhao 10', 36'; Gao 22'

Gifu Prefectural Green Stadium
Umpires:
Rawi Anbananthan (MAS)
Rama Potnis (IND)

28 September 2026
09:00

China	0–5	Malaysia
	Report	Fi. Saari 13'; Anuar 22'; Hamsani 24'; Fa. Saari 43'; Azrai 59'

Gifu Prefectural Green Stadium
Umpires:
Lim Hong-Zhen (SGP)
Mohammad Shahbaz Ali (BAN)

28 September 2026
13:00

Uzbekistan	1–3	Thailand
Komilov 43'	Report	Chueamkaew 5'; Khammi 14'; Hayeeda-Oh 15'

Gifu Prefectural Green Stadium
Umpires:
Deepak Joshi (IND)
You Hyo-sik (KOR)

28 September 2026
15:00

Pakistan	7–2	Oman
Khan 22', 28'; Rana 34', 44', 59'; Ali 40'; Ammad 46'	Report	Al-Nofli 28'; Madit 36'

Gifu Prefectural Green Stadium
Umpires:
Akalanka Ishan Kumara (SRI)
Khalid Hussain (HKG)

== Eleventh place game ==
All times are local (UTC+9)

1 October 2026
09:00

Indonesia	3–3	Oman
Alam 11'; Muhamad 45+'; Al Ardh 56'	Report; SO Report	Barazahan 24'; M. Al-Noufali 29'; Madit 50'
Penalties
Guntara (penalty shoot-out scored); Muhamad (penalty shoot-out missed); Asasi (penalty shoot-out missed); Fathur (penalty shoot-out scored); Firdaus (penalty shoot-out missed)	2–3	(penalty shoot-out scored) A. Al-Noufali; (penalty shoot-out missed) Al-Fazari; (penalty shoot-out scored) Al-Fazari; (penalty shoot-out missed) Al-Wahaibi; (penalty shoot-out scored) Barazahan

Gifu Prefectural Green Stadium
Umpires:
Haroon Rashid (PAK)
Mohammad Shahbaz Ali (BAN)

== Ninth place game ==
All times are local (UTC+9)

3 October 2026
09:00

Sri Lanka	4–2	Uzbekistan
Fernando 27'; Sudusinghe 27'; Bothale 49'; Rathnayake 55'	Report	Khakimov 13'; Sotlikov 33'

Gifu Prefectural Green Stadium
Umpires:
Mazin Al-Shukaili (OMA)
Haroon Rashid (PAK)

== Fifth and seventh place classification ==
All times are local (UTC+9)

Crossover
1 October
Japan	9
Thailand	1
1 October
China	7
Bangladesh	1

Fifth place
3 October
Japan	5
China	0
Seventh place
3 October
Thailand	0
Bangladesh	3

=== Crossover ===
1 October 2026
11:30

Japan	9–1	Thailand
Fujishima 3', 29'; T. Tanaka 12', 17', 25', 41'; Kawabe 14', 52'; Yamasaki 22'	Report	Kuengsamrong 53'

Gifu Prefectural Green Stadium
Umpires:
Zhou Fuyi (CHN)
James Unkles (AUS)

1 October 2026
14:00

China	7–1	Bangladesh
Zhang 2', 44'; Yulai 4'; Chen 24', 56', 59'; Gao 32'	Report	Hasan 30'

Gifu Prefectural Green Stadium
Umpires:
Coen van Bunge (NED)
Hideki Kinoshita (JPN)

=== Seventh place game ===
3 October 2026
11:30

Thailand	0–3	Bangladesh
	Report	Sarkar 3'; Am. Islam 27'; As. Islam 53'

Gifu Prefectural Green Stadium
Umpires:
Hideki Kinoshita (JPN)
Deepak Joshi (IND)

=== Fifth place game ===
3 October 2026
14:00

Japan	5–0	China
Matsumoto 21'; Kawabe 21', 60'; Ooka 48'; Yamasaki 60'	Report

Gifu Prefectural Green Stadium
Umpires:
James Unkles (AUS)
You Hyo-sik (KOR)

== Medal round ==
All times are local (UTC+9)

=== Bracket ===
Semi-finals
1 October
India	4
Pakistan	3
1 October
Malaysia	2
South Korea	1

Gold medal match
3 October
India	5
Malaysia	1
Bronze medal match
3 October
Pakistan	5
South Korea	3

=== Semi-finals ===
1 October 2026
16:30

India	4–3	Pakistan
Harmanpreet 5', 13'; Sukhjeet 23'; Abhishek 60'	Report	Mahmood 30'; Shahid 45'; Rana 49'

Gifu Prefectural Green Stadium
Umpires:
You Hyo-sik (KOR)
Rawi Anbananthan (MAS)

1 October 2026
19:00

Malaysia	2–1	South Korea
Azrai 40', 45'	Report	Lee G. 42'

Gifu Prefectural Green Stadium
Umpires:
Sean Rapaport (RSA)
Lim Hong-Zhen (SGP)

=== Bronze medal match ===
3 October 2026
16:30

Pakistan	5–3	South Korea
Khan 4'; Abdul 30'; Rana 52', 54'; Shahid 59'	Report	Lee G. 12'; Kim Y. 18'; Yang 25'

Gifu Prefectural Green Stadium
Umpires:
Coen van Bunge (NED)
Rawi Anbananthan (MAS)

=== Gold medal match ===
3 October 2026
19:00

India	5–1	Malaysia
Harmanpreet 11', 57'; Jugraj 23'; Hardik 42'; Lakra 54'	Report	Silverius 14'

Gifu Prefectural Green Stadium
Umpires:
Sean Rapaport (RSA)
Lim Hong-Zhen (SGP)

Men's Field hockey at the 2026 Asian Games
(India)
India
5th title

== Final standings ==
As per statistical convention in field hockey, matches decided by penalty shoot-outs are counted as draws.

Pos	Team	Pld	W	D	L	GF	GA	GD	Pts	Qualification
Gold medal	India	7	7	0	0	58	8	+50	21	2028 Summer Olympics
Silver medal	Malaysia	7	6	0	1	37	10	+27	18	2028 FIH Hockey Olympic Qualifiers
Bronze medal	Pakistan	7	5	0	2	36	15	+21	15	2028 FIH Hockey Olympic Qualifiers
4	South Korea	7	4	0	3	24	17	+7	12	2028 FIH Hockey Olympic Qualifiers
5	Japan (H)	7	5	0	2	43	8	+35	15	2028 FIH Hockey Olympic Qualifiers
6	China	7	4	0	3	20	16	+4	12	2028 FIH Hockey Olympic Qualifiers
7	Bangladesh	7	3	0	4	13	30	−17	9	2028 FIH Hockey Olympic Qualifiers
8	Thailand	7	2	0	5	6	40	−34	6	
9	Sri Lanka	6	2	0	4	10	40	−30	6	
10	Uzbekistan	6	1	0	5	8	24	−16	3	
11	Oman	6	0	1	5	7	23	−16	1	
12	Indonesia	6	0	1	5	9	40	−31	1	

Source: FIH
(H) Hosts

== Goalscorers ==
There were 271 goals scored in 40 matches, for an average of 6.78 goals per match.

12 goals

- (India) Harmanpreet Singh
- (Pakistan) Sufyan Khan

9 goals

- (India) Abhishek
- (India) Dilpreet Singh
- (Japan) Koji Yamasaki
- (Malaysia) Abu Kamal Azrai
- (Malaysia) Faizal Saari

8 goals

- (Japan) Kosei Kawabe

7 goals

- (India) Jugraj Singh
- (Japan) Raiki Fujishima
- (Pakistan) Waheed Rana

6 goals

- (China) Gao Jiesheng
- (India) Shilanand Lakra
- (India) Sukhjeet Singh
- (Japan) Tsubasa Tanaka
- (South Korea) Lim Do-hyun

5 goals

- (Bangladesh) Amirul Islam
- (Malaysia) Shello Silverius
- (South Korea) Yang Ji-hun

4 goals

- (China) Chen Benhai
- (China) Zhao Yulai
- (Pakistan) Hannan Shahid

3 goals

- (Bangladesh) Ashraful Islam
- (China) Zhang Jialiang
- (India) Mandeep Singh
- (Indonesia) Aulia Al Ardh
- (Japan) Naru Kimura
- (Japan) Kazumasa Matsumoto
- (Japan) Ryoma Ooka
- (Malaysia) Akhimullah Anuar
- (Pakistan) Abu Mahmood
- (Pakistan) Ahmad Nadeem
- (South Korea) Lee Gang-san

2 goals

- (China) He Yonghua
- (India) Rajinder Singh
- (Indonesia) Fadli Muhamad
- (Indonesia) Alfandy Prastyo
- (Malaysia) Ashran Hamsani
- (Malaysia) Faiz Jali
- (Malaysia) Fitri Saari
- (Oman) Aiman Madit
- (Pakistan) Abdul Rehman
- (Pakistan) Muhammad Ammad
- (South Korea) Kim Yong-bok
- (Sri Lanka) Udayashan Fernando
- (Sri Lanka) Suresh Rathnayake
- (Sri Lanka) Sanda Sudusinghe
- (Uzbekistan) Fozilbek Husanov
- (Uzbekistan) Khakimboy Khakimov

1 goal

- (Bangladesh) Rakibul Hasan
- (Bangladesh) Mahbub Hossain
- (Bangladesh) Rashel Mahmud
- (Bangladesh) Khaled Rakin
- (Bangladesh) Roman Sarkar
- (China) Du Shihao
- (India) Vivek Sagar Prasad
- (India) Sanjay
- (India) Hardik Singh
- (India) Manpreet Singh
- (Indonesia) Asrul Alam
- (Indonesia) Arthur Wibowo
- (Japan) Taiki Takade
- (Japan) Kaito Tanaka
- (Japan) Seren Tanaka
- (Japan) Jun Watanabe
- (Malaysia) Muhajir Abdu Rauf
- (Malaysia) Azimuddin Kamaruddin
- (Malaysia) Aminuddin Mohd Zain
- (Malaysia) Aiman Rozemi
- (Malaysia) Norsyafiq Sumantri
- (Oman) Rashad Al-Fazari
- (Oman) Khalid Al-Hasni
- (Oman) Al-Baraa Al-Nofli
- (Oman) Mohammed Al-Noufali
- (Oman) Asama Barazahan
- (Pakistan) Ghazanfar Ali
- (Pakistan) Ammad Butt
- (Pakistan) Moin Shakeel
- (South Korea) Bae Soung-min
- (South Korea) Kim Hyeon-hong
- (South Korea) Kim Jae-ho
- (South Korea) Oh Se-yong
- (South Korea) Park Cheoleon
- (South Korea) Rim Jin-kang
- (South Korea) Sim Jae-won
- (South Korea) Son Da-in
- (Sri Lanka) Sandaruwan Batuvita
- (Sri Lanka) Seran Bothale
- (Sri Lanka) Daammika Ranasingha
- (Sri Lanka) Kusal Weerappuli
- (Thailand) Pichet Chaimanee
- (Thailand) Kritsada Chueamkaew
- (Thailand) Arfis Hayeeda-Oh
- (Thailand) Tanakit Juntakian
- (Thailand) Konlawat Khammi
- (Thailand) Natthawat Kuengsamrong
- (Uzbekistan) Azamatkhon Abboskhonov
- (Uzbekistan) Jamshidbek Komilov
- (Uzbekistan) Shokhrukhbek Salimjonov
- (Uzbekistan) Doston Sotlikov

Source: FIH

== Records ==
- The Pakistan men's national field hockey team extended their 68-year record for the most goals scored in Asian Games history. They added 36 more goals to their previous total of 515 goals, which had been achieved through the conclusion of the 2022 Asian Games. The new tally stands at 551 goals.

Note: All statistics are correct as of 3 October 2026.

== Controversies ==
=== Anthem mix-up ===
Before the Pool A match between South Korea and Bangladesh on 18 September, North Korea's national anthem was mistakenly played instead of South Korea's at Green Stadium in Gifu. The South Korean players appeared confused, and the stadium announcer apologised for the error. South Korea subsequently defeated Bangladesh 5–0.

== See also ==
- Field hockey at the 2026 Asian Games
- Field hockey at the 2026 Asian Games – Women's tournament
