= Masaki Ohashi =

Japanese field hockey player

Personal information
- Born: 8 May 1993 (age 33) Nikkō, Japan
- Height: 1.70 m (5 ft 7 in)

Sport
- Sport: Field hockey
- Position: Defender
- Club: Tochigi Liebe
National team
| Years | Team | Caps | Goals |
| 2016– | Japan | 149 | (1) |
Medal record
Men's field hockey
Representing Japan
Asian Games
| Gold medal – first place | 2018 Jakarta | Team |
| Silver medal – second place | 2022 Hangzhou | Team |
Asian Champions Trophy
| Silver medal – second place | 2021 Dhaka |
| Bronze medal – third place | 2023 Chennai |
- Updated on 31 December 2023

Masaki Ohashi (大橋 雅貴, Ōhashi Masaki, born 8 May 1993) is a Japanese field hockey player. He competed in the 2020 Summer Olympics.

He was a part of the Japan squad which won their first Asian Games gold medal in hockey in 2018.
