= Field hockey at the 2022 Asian Games – Men's tournament =

Men's field hockey at the 2022 Asian Games
Tournament details
- Host country: China
- City: Hangzhou
- Dates: 24 September – 6 October 2023
- Teams: 12 (from 1 confederation)
- Venue(s): Gongshu Canal Sports Park Field Hockey Field

Final positions
- Champions: India (4th title)
- Runner-up: Japan
- Third place: South Korea

Tournament statistics
- Matches played: 38
- Goals scored: 331 (8.71 per match)
- Top scorer(s): (South Korea) Jang Jong-Hyun (18 goals)

The men's field hockey tournament at the 2022 Asian Games was the 17th edition of the field hockey event for men at the Asian Games. It was held alongside the women's tournament at the Gongshu Canal Sports Park Field Hockey Field in Hangzhou, China from 24 September to 6 October 2023.

India won their fourth Asian Games title by defeating the defending champions Japan 5–1 in the final. South Korea won the bronze medal after defeating the hosts China 2–1. As winners India qualified directly for the 2024 Summer Olympics.

== Qualified teams ==
| Qualification | Date | Host | Berths | Qualified team |
|---|---|---|---|---|
| Host country | 16 September 2016 | — | 1 | China |
| 2018 Asian Games | 20 August – 1 September 2018 | (Indonesia) Jakarta | 5 | Japan; Malaysia; India; Pakistan; South Korea |
| 2022 Asian Games Qualifier | 6–15 May 2022 | (Thailand) Bangkok | 6 | Oman; Bangladesh; Indonesia; Thailand; ~~Sri Lanka~~; Uzbekistan; Singapore |
| Total | | | 12 | |

== Preliminary round ==
=== Pool A ===
| Pos | Team | Pld | W | D | L | GF | GA | GD | Pts | Qualification |
|---|---|---|---|---|---|---|---|---|---|---|
| 1 | India | 5 | 5 | 0 | 0 | 58 | 5 | +53 | 15 | Semi-finals |
| 2 | Japan | 5 | 4 | 0 | 1 | 36 | 9 | +27 | 12 | Semi-finals |
| 3 | Pakistan | 5 | 3 | 0 | 2 | 38 | 17 | +21 | 9 | Fifth place game |
| 4 | Bangladesh | 5 | 2 | 0 | 3 | 15 | 29 | −14 | 6 | Seventh place game |
| 5 | Uzbekistan | 5 | 1 | 0 | 4 | 7 | 49 | −42 | 3 | Ninth place game |
| 6 | Singapore | 5 | 0 | 0 | 5 | 5 | 50 | −45 | 0 | Eleventh place game |

Source: FIH
Rules for classification: 1) points; 2) matches won; 3) goal difference; 4) goals for; 5) head-to-head result; 6) field goals for.

24 September 2023
11:15

| India | 16–0 | Uzbekistan |
|---|---|---|
| Lalit 7', 24', 53'; Varun 12', 36', 50', 52'; Abhishek 17'; Mandeep 18', 27', 28'; Sukhjeet 37', 42'; Amit 38'; Shamsher 43'; Sanjay 57' | Report |

Umpires:
Nazmi Kamaruddin (MAS)
Khamis Al Balushi (OMA)

24 September 2023
13:30

| Japan | 7–2 | Bangladesh |
|---|---|---|
| Ooka 2'; Nagayoshi 5'; Kato 8'; Mitani 10'; Yamada 44', 51'; Nagai 45' | Report | As. Islam 29'; Khisa 43' |

Umpires:
Rawi Anbananthan (MAS)
Paul Walker (ENG)

24 September 2023
20:45

| Pakistan | 11–0 | Singapore |
|---|---|---|
| Ahmad 7', 36', 42'; Rana 17'; Liaqat 19', 27', 44'; Afraz 26'; Rehman 28'; Ammad 42'; Su. Khan 46' | Report |

Umpires:
You Hyo-Sik (KOR)
Zhinan Tao (CHN)

26 September 2023
09:00

| India | 16–1 | Singapore |
|---|---|---|
| Mandeep 12', 30', 51'; Lalit 16'; Gurjant 22'; Vivek 23'; Harmanpreet 24', 39', 40', 42'; Manpreet 37'; Shamsher 38'; Abhishek 51', 52'; Varun 55', 55' | Report | Zulkarnain 53' |

Umpires:
Sean Rapaport (RSA)
Chi Gang (CHN)

26 September 2023
13:30

| Uzbekistan | 1–10 | Japan |
|---|---|---|
| Ruslan 52' | Report | Niwa 2'; Kato 10', 24'; Fujishima 20', 30', 59'; Fukuda 27', 40'; Kawabe 49'; S. Tanaka 53' |

Umpires:
Shahbaz Ali (BAN)
Tao Zhinan (CHN)

26 September 2023
15:45

| Pakistan | 5–2 | Bangladesh |
|---|---|---|
| Afraz 30'; Sh. Khan 40'; Ammad 43'; Su. Khan 48'; Ahmad 57' | Report | Khisa 19'; Mi. Hossain 46' |

Umpires:
Paul Walker (ENG)
Nazmi Kamaruddin (MAS)

28 September 2023
09:00

| Uzbekistan | 2–18 | Pakistan |
|---|---|---|
| Oblokulov 24'; Khudoynazarov 54' | Report | Liaqit 2'; R. Khan 2'; Ahmad 10', 20', 29', 45', 59'; Bhutta 12', 17'; Rehman 14', 53'; Sh. Khan 23'; Rana 23', 31', 42'; Afraz 29', 41', 55' |

Umpires:
Khamis Al Balushi (OMA)
Chi Gang (CHN)

28 September 2023
11:15

| Bangladesh | 7–3 | Singapore |
|---|---|---|
| Khisa 7'; Mi. Hossain 23'; As. Islam 35'; A. Hossain 44'; Hasan 47'; Sobuj 57', 60' | Report | Naidu 38', 51'; Loo 39' |

Umpires:
Tao Zhinan (CHN)
Jakub Mejzlík (CZE)

28 September 2023
20:45

| Japan | 2–4 | India |
|---|---|---|
| Kato 60'; Mitani 57' | Report | Abhishek 13', 48'; Mandeep 24'; Amit 34' |

Umpires:
Sean Rapaport (RSA)
You Hyo-Sik (KOR)

30 September 2023
09:00

| Singapore | 0–14 | Japan |
|---|---|---|
| | Report | Ooka 4', 13', 42'; Nagayoshi 5'; Fujishima 10'; Kato 14', 40', 49'; Niwa 15'; S. Tanaka 19'; Fukuda 47', 58'; Kawabe 52'; Mitani 57' |

Umpires:
Al Balushi Khamis (OMA)
Chi Gang (CHN)

30 September 2023
15:45

| Bangladesh | 4–2 | Uzbekistan |
|---|---|---|
| As. Islam 10', 42'; A. Hossain 21'; Am. Islam 52' | Report | Ruslan 17'; Oblokulov 26' |

Umpires:
You Hyo-Sik (KOR)
Tao Zhinan (CHN)

30 September 2023
20:45

| Pakistan | 2–10 | India |
|---|---|---|
| Su. Khan 38'; Afraz 45' | Report | Mandeep 8'; Harmanpreet 11', 17', 33', 34'; Sumit 30'; Varun 41', 54'; Shamsher 46'; Lalit 49' |

Umpires:
Lim Hong-Zhen (SGP)
Kamaruddin Nazmi (MAS)

2 October 2023
13:30

| Singapore | 1–2 | Uzbekistan |
|---|---|---|
| Loo 39' | Report | Madaminov 44'; Oblokulov 48' |

Umpires:
You Hyo-Sik (KOR)
Khamis Al Balushi (OMA)

2 October 2023
15:45

| India | 12–0 | Bangladesh |
|---|---|---|
| Harmanpreet 2', 4', 32'; Mandeep 18', 24', 46'; Lalit 23'; Amit 28'; Abhishek 41', 57'; Nilakanta 47'; Gurjant 56' | Report |

Umpires:
Paul Walker (ENG)
Tao Zhinan (CHN)

2 October 2023
18:30

| Japan | 3–2 | Pakistan |
|---|---|---|
| K. Tanaka 6'; Fukuda 17'; Fujishima 28' | Report | Liaqat 5'; Ahmad 28' |

Umpires:
Javed Shaikh (IND)
Rawi Anbananthan (MAS)

=== Pool B ===
| Pos | Team | Pld | W | D | L | GF | GA | GD | Pts | Qualification |
|---|---|---|---|---|---|---|---|---|---|---|
| 1 | China (H) | 5 | 4 | 1 | 0 | 24 | 9 | +15 | 13 | Semi-finals |
| 2 | South Korea | 5 | 4 | 0 | 1 | 42 | 8 | +34 | 12 | Semi-finals |
| 3 | Malaysia | 5 | 3 | 1 | 1 | 36 | 11 | +25 | 10 | Fifth place game |
| 4 | Oman | 5 | 2 | 0 | 3 | 14 | 35 | −21 | 6 | Seventh place game |
| 5 | Indonesia | 5 | 1 | 0 | 4 | 7 | 28 | −21 | 3 | Ninth place game |
| 6 | Thailand | 5 | 0 | 0 | 5 | 3 | 35 | −32 | 0 | Eleventh place game |

Source: FIH
Rules for classification: 1) points; 2) matches won; 3) goal difference; 4) goals for; 5) head-to-head result; 6) field goals for.
(H) Hosts

24 September 2023
09:00

| Malaysia | 9–0 | Thailand |
|---|---|---|
| Abu 8', 34'; Firhan 21'; Rozemi 30', 32'; Aminudin 43', 45+'; Hamirin 57'; Azahar 60' | Report |

Umpires:
Raghu Prasad (IND)
Shahbaz Ali (BAN)

24 September 2023
15:45

| South Korea | 10–0 | Indonesia |
|---|---|---|
| Jang 23', 35', 47', 57'; Lee H. 7'; Ji 25'; Son 36'; Yang 38'; Kim Ju. 45'; Kim H. 52' | Report |

Umpires:
Javed Shaikh (IND)
Haroon Rashid (BAN)

24 September 2023
18:30

| China | 3–2 | Oman |
|---|---|---|
| Gao 33', 54'; Lin 41' | Report | Al Nofali 20'; Al Lawati 52' |

Umpires:
Sean Rapaport (RSA)
Hong-Zhen Lim (SGP)

26 September 2023
11:15

| Malaysia | 11–1 | Oman |
|---|---|---|
| Razie 3', 11'; Hamsani 14', 30', 34'; Silverius 18'; Faizal 26', 36'; Abu 29', 35'; Farizal 34' | Report | Al Lawati 23' |

Umpires:
Jakub Mejzlik (CZE)
Kinoshita Hideki (JPN)

26 September 2023
18:30

| Indonesia | 1–5 | China |
|---|---|---|
| Al Akbar 51' | Report | Du 7'; Chen C. 13'; Zhang 19'; Pan 34', 39' |

Umpires:
Javed Shaikh (IND)
Rawi Anbananthan (MAS)

26 September 2023
20:45

| South Korea | 10–0 | Thailand |
|---|---|---|
| Jang 6', 33', 36', 46'; Yang 18', 60'; Lee J. 24'; Kim S. 36'; Kim Ju. 53'; Park 57' | Report |

Umpires:
Haroon Rashid (PAK)
Khamis Al Balushi (OMA)

28 September 2023
13:30

| Oman | 5–3 | Thailand |
|---|---|---|
| R. Al Fazari 13'; A. Bait Shamaiaa 25'; Al Balushi 29'; M. Bait Shamaiaa 44'; Al Nofali 56' | Report | Boon-Art 7', 14', 46' |

Umpires:
Paul Walker (ENG)
Nazmi Kamaruddin (MAS)

28 September 2023
15:45

| Indonesia | 2–9 | Malaysia |
|---|---|---|
| Asasi 15'; Al Ardh 55' | Report | Hamsani 5'; Firhan 17'; Jazlan 19', 35'; Faizal 33'; Silverius 38'; Abu 42'; Razie 43'; Aminudin 48' |

Umpires:
Hong-Zhen Lim (SGP)
Haroon Rashid (PAK)

28 September 2023
18:30

| China | 3–2 | South Korea |
|---|---|---|
| Gao 52', 60'; E 59' | Report | Jang 2', 10' |

30 September 2023
11:15

| Oman | 4–2 | Indonesia |
|---|---|---|
| Al Lawati 37', 41'; Madit 39'; A. Bait Shamaiaa 48' | Report | Fathur 23'; Muhamad 34' |

Umpires:
Jakub Mejzlik (CZE)
Rawi Anbananthan (MAS)

30 September 2023
13:30

| Malaysia | 3–4 | South Korea |
|---|---|---|
| Hamsani 5'; Faizal 30+'; Razie 44' | Report | Jang 11', 44'; Lee 32'; Yang 33' |

Umpires:
Sean Rapaport (RSA)
Paul Walker (ENG)

30 September 2023
18:30

| Thailand | 0–9 | China |
|---|---|---|
| | Report | Lin 1', 46'; E 2'; Liu 15', 36'; Gao 20', 38', 51'; Ao 58' |

Umpires:
Ali Shahbaz (BAN)
Hideki Kinoshita (JPN)

2 October 2023
09:00

| South Korea | 16–2 | Oman |
|---|---|---|
| Jung 4', 40', 45'; Jang 10', 18', 35', 50', 56'; Lee J. 20'; Park 21'; Hwang 25', 33'; Yang 25', 60'; Kim Ju. 34'; Lee N. 59' | Report | Al Shaaibi 32'; Al Lawati 48' |

Umpires:
Jakub Mejzlík (CZE)
Lim Hong-Zhen (SGP)

2 October 2023
11:15

| Thailand | 0–2 | Indonesia |
|---|---|---|
| | Report | Alfiana 3'; Al Ardh 8' |

Umpires:
Chi Gang (CHN)
Hideki Kinoshita (JPN)

2 October 2023
20:45

| China | 4–4 | Malaysia |
|---|---|---|
| Gao 13'; Chen Q. 20'; Liu 36'; Zhu 43' | Report | Abu 18'; Hamsani 25'; Azahar 35'; Jali 40' |

Umpires:
Sean Rapaport (RSA)
Haroon Rashid (PAK)

== Classification round ==
=== Eleventh place game ===
4 October 2023
10:15

| Singapore | 2–3 | Thailand |
|---|---|---|
| Marican 4'; Chua 30' | Report | Phokphun 10'; Juntakian 20'; Rungniyom 50' |

Umpires:
Sean Rapaport (ENG)
Ali Shahbaz (BAN)

=== Ninth place game ===
4 October 2023
12:45

| Uzbekistan | 1–4 | Indonesia |
|---|---|---|
| Ruslan 51' | Report | Al Akbar 5'; Al Ardh 22', 50'; Priliandro 28' |

Umpires:
You Hyo-Sik (KOR)
Hideki Kinoshita (JPN)

=== Seventh place game ===
6 October 2023
10:15

| Bangladesh | 3–4 | Oman |
|---|---|---|
| Mi. Hossain 11'; Mahmud 18'; Sobuj 60' | Report | Al Fazari 38'; Al Lawati 43'; Madit 53', 55' |

Umpires:
Sean Rapaport (RSA)
Paul Walker (ENG)

=== Fifth place game ===
6 October 2023
12:45

| Pakistan | 5–2 | Malaysia |
|---|---|---|
| Ahmad 8'; Rehman 37'; Rana 51'; Ammad 53'; Afraz 59' | Report | Aminudin 5'; Razie 58' |

Umpires:
You Hyo-Sik (KOR)
Kinoshita Hideki (JPN)

== Medal round ==
=== Bracket ===
Semi-finals
4 October
India | 5
South Korea | 3
4 October
China | 2
Japan | 3

Gold medal match
6 October
India | 5
Japan | 1
Bronze medal match
6 October
South Korea | 2
China | 1

=== Semi-finals ===
4 October 2023
16:00

| India | 5–3 | South Korea |
|---|---|---|
| Hardik 5'; Mandeep 11'; Lalit 15'; Amit 24'; Abhishek 54' | Report | Jung 17', 20', 42' |

Umpires:
Lim Hong-Zhen (SGP)
Rawi Anbananthan (MAS)

4 October 2023
18:30

| China | 2–3 | Japan |
|---|---|---|
| Lin 47'; Gao 59' | Report | Nagayoshi 29'; Fujishima 42'; Ooka 48' |

Umpires:
Javed Shaikh (IND)
Nazmi Kamaruddin (MAS)

=== Bronze medal match ===
6 October 2023
16:00

| South Korea | 2–1 | China |
|---|---|---|
| Kim S. 9'; Jang 59' | Report | Gao 8' |

Umpires:
Rawi Anbananthan (MAS)
Javed Shaikh (IND)

=== Gold medal match ===
6 October 2023
18:30

| India | 5–1 | Japan |
|---|---|---|
| Manpreet 25'; Harmanpreet 32', 59'; Amit 36'; Abhishek 48' | Report | S. Tanaka 51' |

Umpires:
Nazmi Kamaruddin (MAS)
Lim Hong-Zhen (SGP)

== Statistics ==
=== Final standings ===
| Pos | Team | Qualification |
|---|---|---|
| 1st place, gold medalist(s) | India | 2024 Summer Olympics |
| 2nd place, silver medalist(s) | Japan | 2024 FIH Hockey Olympic Qualifiers |
| 3rd place, bronze medalist(s) | South Korea | 2024 FIH Hockey Olympic Qualifiers |
| 4 | China (H) | 2024 FIH Hockey Olympic Qualifiers |
| 5 | Pakistan | 2024 FIH Hockey Olympic Qualifiers |
| 6 | Malaysia | 2024 FIH Hockey Olympic Qualifiers |
| 7 | Oman | |
| 8 | Bangladesh | |
| 9 | Indonesia | |
| 10 | Uzbekistan | |
| 11 | Thailand | |
| 12 | Singapore | |

Source: FIH
(H) Host

=== Goalscorers ===
There were 331 goals scored in 38 matches, for an average of 8.71 goals per match.

18 goals

- (South Korea) Jang Jong-Hyun

13 goals

- (India) Harmanpreet Singh

12 goals

- (India) Mandeep Singh

11 goals

- (Pakistan) Arbaz Ahmad

10 goals

- (China) Gao Jiesheng

9 goals

- (India) Abhishek

8 goals

- (India) Varun Kumar

7 goals

- (India) Lalit Upadhyay
- (Japan) Ryosei Kato

6 goals

- (Japan) Raiki Fujishima
- (Malaysia) Abu Kamal Azrai
- (Malaysia) Ashran Hamsani
- (Oman) Fahad Al Lawati
- (Pakistan) Afraz
- (Pakistan) Waheed Rana
- (South Korea) Jung Man-Jae
- (South Korea) Yang Ji-Hun

5 goals

- (India) Amit Rohidas
- (Japan) Kentaro Fukuda
- (Japan) Ryoma Ooka
- (Malaysia) Razie Rahim
- (Pakistan) Arshad Liaqat

4 goals

- (Bangladesh) Ashraful Islam
- (China) Lin Changliang
- (Indonesia) Aulia Al Ardh
- (Pakistan) Abdul Rehman
- (Malaysia) Aminudin Muhamed
- (Malaysia) Faizal Saari

3 goals

- (Bangladesh) Milon Hossain
- (Bangladesh) Puskar Khisa
- (Bangladesh) Shohanur Sobuj
- (China) Pan Dongquan
- (India) Shamsher Singh
- (Japan) Genki Mitani
- (Japan) Ken Nagayoshi
- (Japan) Seren Tanaka
- (Malaysia) Najmi Jazlan
- (Oman) Aiman Madit
- (Pakistan) Muhammad Ammad
- (Pakistan) Muhammad Khan (b. 2004)
- (South Korea) Kim Jung-Hoo
- (Thailand) Thanakrit Boon-Art
- (Uzbekistan) Jonibek Oblokulov
- (Uzbekistan) Karimov Ruslan

2 goals

- (Bangladesh) Arshad Hossain
- (China) E Wenhui
- (China) Liu Junjie
- (India) Gurjant Singh
- (India) Manpreet Singh
- (India) Sukhjeet Singh
- (Indonesia) Abdullah Al Akbar
- (Japan) Kosei Kawabe
- (Japan) Takuma Niwa
- (Japan) Shota Yamada
- (Malaysia) Firhan Ashari
- (Malaysia) Amirul Azahar
- (Malaysia) Aiman Rozemi
- (Malaysia) Shello Silverius
- (Oman) Rashad Al Fazari
- (Oman) Ahmed Al Nofali
- (Oman) Akram Bait Shamaiaa
- (Pakistan) Muhammad Umar Bhutta
- (Pakistan) Muhammad Khan (b. 2000)
- (Singapore) Kent Loo
- (Singapore) Hariraj Naidu
- (South Korea) Hwang Tae-Il
- (South Korea) Kim Sung-Hyun
- (South Korea) Lee Jung-Jun
- (South Korea) Lee Nam-Yong
- (South Korea) Park Cheo-Leon

1 goal

- (Bangladesh) Rakibul Hasan
- (Bangladesh) Amirul Islam
- (Bangladesh) Rashel Mahmud
- (China) Ao Weibao
- (China) Chen Chongcong
- (China) Chen Qijun
- (China) Du Shihao
- (China) Zhang Bo
- (China) Zhu Weijiang
- (India) Vivek Prasad
- (India) Sanjay
- (India) Nilakanta Sharma
- (India) Hardik Singh
- (India) Sumit
- (Indonesia) Muhamad Alfiana
- (Indonesia) Ahdan Asasi
- (Indonesia) Mochamad Fathur
- (Indonesia) Fadli Muhamad
- (Indonesia) Revo Priliandro
- (Japan) Yuma Nagai
- (Japan) Kaito Tanaka
- (Malaysia) Najmi Farizal
- (Malaysia) Khaliq Hamirin
- (Malaysia) Faiz Jali
- (Oman) Ahmed Al Balushi
- (Oman) Khalid Al Shaaibi
- (Oman) Mahmood Bait Shamaiaa
- (Pakistan) Rooman Khan
- (Singapore) Alton Chua
- (Singapore) Enrico Marican
- (Singapore) Zaki Zulkarnain
- (South Korea) Son Da-In
- (South Korea) Kim Hyeong-Jin
- (South Korea) Lee Hye-Seung
- (South Korea) Ji Woo-Cheon
- (Thailand) Tanakit Juntakian
- (Thailand) Udomchok Phokphun
- (Thailand) Chanachol Rungniyom
- (Uzbekistan) Bunyodbek Khudoynazarov
- (Uzbekistan) Abdusalom Madaminov

Source: FIH

== See also ==
- 2023 Men's Asian Champions Trophy
