= 2022 Sultan Azlan Shah Cup =

Malaysian men's field hockey tournament

Tournament details
- Host country: Malaysia
- City: Ipoh
- Dates: 1-10 November
- Teams: 6 (from 2 confederations)
- Venue: Azlan Shah Stadium

Final positions
- Champions: Malaysia (1st title)
- Runner-up: South Korea
- Third place: Pakistan

Tournament statistics
- Matches played: 18
- Goals scored: 72 (4 per match)
- Top scorer: (Malaysia) Razie Rahim (6 goals)

The 2022 Sultan Azlan Shah Cup was the 29th edition of the Sultan Azlan Shah Cup. It was held in Ipoh, Malaysia from 1 until 10 November.

The number of teams for this year's cup is the same as last edition's tournament where six teams competed. Pakistan, Egypt, Japan, Malaysia, South Africa, and South Korea participated in this edition of the Sultan Azlan Shah Cup.

== Teams ==
Including the host nation, 6 teams competed in the tournament.

- Malaysia
- Pakistan
- Egypt
- Japan
- South Korea
- South Africa

== Results ==
All times are local, MYT (UTC+8).

=== Pool ===
Pos	Team	Pld	W	D	L	GF	GA	GD	Pts	Qualification
1	South Korea	5	4	1	0	8	2	+6	13	Final
2	Malaysia (H)	5	3	1	1	16	9	+7	10	Final
3	Japan	5	2	1	2	9	9	0	7	Third place game
4	Pakistan	5	1	2	2	9	10	−1	5	Third place game
5	Egypt	5	1	1	3	5	9	−4	4	Fifth place game
6	South Africa	5	1	0	4	9	17	−8	3	Fifth place game

Source: FIH
Rules for classification: 1) points; 2) matches won; 3) goal difference; 4) goals for; 5) head-to-head result; 6) field goals for.
(H) Hosts

1 November 2022
16:00

Japan	1–0	Egypt
Yamasaki 16'	Report

Umpires:
Javed Shaikh (IND)
Haroon Rashid (PAK)

1 November 2022
18:00

Pakistan	1–4	South Africa
Shahid 47'	Report	De Lora 25'; Beauchamp 27'; Ngubane 38'; Le Forestier 43'

Umpires:
Ahmed Elsayed (EGY)
Puvalagan Paskaran (MAS)

1 November 2022
20:00

Malaysia	0–3	South Korea
	Report	Jang Jong-hyun 10', 33'; Kim Hyeon-hong 30'

Umpires:
Darren Hubach (RSA)
Kenta Uziie (JPN)

2 November 2022
16:00

South Africa	0–3	Egypt
	Report	Adel 7'; Atef 15'; Ali 22'

Umpires:
Haroon Rashid (PAK)
Puvalagan Paskaran (MAS)

2 November 2022
18:00

Japan	0–1	South Korea
	Report	Jeon Byung-jin 43'

Umpires:
Ahmed Elsayed (EGY)
Norhisham Shaari (MAS)

2 November 2022
20:00

Pakistan	1–1	Malaysia
Ahmad 36'	Report	Silverius 26'

Umpires:
Raghu Prasad (IND)
You Hyosik (KOR)

4 November 2022
16:00

Japan	2–2	Pakistan
Fukuda 43'; Kawabe 55'	Report	Sufyan 17', 19'

Umpires:
Darren Hubach (RSA)
You Hyosik (KOR)

4 November 2022
18:00

Egypt	0–0	South Korea
	Report

Umpires:
Javed Shaikh (IND)
Norhisham Shaari (MAS)

5 November 2022
16:00

South Korea	2–1	Pakistan
Kim Hyeon-hong 51', 52'	Report	Shahid 4'

Umpires:
Raghu Prasad (IND)
Kenta Uziie (JPN)

5 November 2022
18:00

South Africa	2–4	Japan
Sherwood 7', 54'	Report	Kato 11'; S. Tanaka 20'; Yamasaki 27'; Saeki 51'

Umpires:
Hyosik You (KOR)
Puvalagan Paskaran (MAS)

5 November 2022
20:00

Malaysia	4–1	Egypt
Silverius 13', 51'; Ashari 41'; Azahar 49'	Report	Mamdouh 27'

Umpires:
Darren Hubach (RSA)
Haroon Rashid (PAK)

6 November 2022
17:00

South Africa	2–7	Malaysia
Le Forestier 12'; Beauchamp 35'	Report	Rahim 18', 20', 51'; Rozemi 23'; Azrai 24'; Silverius 39'; Jazlan 43'

Umpires:
Ahmed Elsayed (EGY)
Kenta Uziie (JPN)

7 November 2022
16:00

South Korea	2–1	South Africa
Jeon Byung-jin 26', 32'	Report	Sherwood 40'

Umpires:
Ahmed Elsayed (EGY)
Norhisham Shaari (MAS)

7 November 2022
18:00

Egypt	1–4	Pakistan
M. Ragab 50'	Report	Rana 12'; Sufyan 26', 44'; Liaqat 39'

Umpires:
Raghu Prasad (IND)
Puvalagan Paskaran (MAS)

7 November 2022
20:00

Malaysia	4–2	Japan
Rahim 8', 9'; Rozemi 31'; Sumantri 46'	Report	K. Tanaka 23'; Yamada 35'

Umpires:
Javed Shaikh (IND)
Hyosik You (KOR)

=== Classification round ===
==== Fifth and sixth place ====
9 November 2022
16:00

Egypt	2–1	South Africa
Adel 29'; I. Ragab 44'	Report	Beauchamp 12'

Umpires:
Norhisham Shaari (MAS)
Kenta Uziie (JPN)

==== Third and fourth place ====
9 November 2022
18:15

Japan	3–5	Pakistan
Fukuda 10'; Nagai 31', 50'	Report	Shahid 11'; Ahmad 18'; Khan 27', 35'; Rana 53'

Umpires:
Javed Shaikh (IND)
Darren Hubach (RSA)

==== Final ====
10 November 2022
20:00

South Korea	2–3	Malaysia
Jang Jong-hyun 16'; Jeon Byung-jin 58'	Report	Silverius 15'; Rahim 45'; Mohd 48'

Umpires:
Haroon Rashid (PAK)
Raghu Prasad (IND)

== Statistics ==
=== Final standing ===
Pos	Team
1st place, gold medalist(s)	Malaysia (H)
2nd place, silver medalist(s)	South Korea
3rd place, bronze medalist(s)	Pakistan
4	Japan
5	Egypt
6	South Africa

Source: FIH
(H) Host

=== Goalscorers ===
There were 72 goals scored in 18 matches, for an average of 4 goals per match.

6 goals

- (Malaysia) Razie Rahim

5 goals

- (Malaysia) Shello Silverius

4 goals

- (Pakistan) Sufyan Khan
- (South Korea) Jeon Byung-jin

3 goals

- (Pakistan) Hannan Shahid
- (South Africa) Connor Beauchamp
- (South Africa) Bradley Sherwood
- (South Korea) Jang Jong-hyun
- (South Korea) Kim Hyeon-hong

2 goals

- (Japan) Kentaro Fukuda
- (Japan) Yuma Nagai
- (Japan) Koji Yamasaki
- (Malaysia) Aiman Rozemi
- (Pakistan) Arbaz Ahmad
- (Pakistan) Waheed Rana
- (Pakistan) Rooman Khan
- (South Africa) Cameron Le Forestier

1 goal

- (Egypt) Mohamed Adel
- (Egypt) Ziad Adel
- (Egypt) Mohamed Ali
- (Egypt) Hamada Atef
- (Egypt) Mahmoud Mamdouh
- (Egypt) Ismail Ragab
- (Egypt) Mohamed Ragab
- (Japan) Ryosei Kato
- (Japan) Kosei Kawabe
- (Japan) Koudai Saeki
- (Japan) Kaito Tanaka
- (Japan) Seren Tanaka
- (Japan) Shota Yamada
- (Malaysia) Firhan Ashari
- (Malaysia) Amirul Azahar
- (Malaysia) Abu Azrai
- (Malaysia) Najmi Jazlan
- (Malaysia) Muhd Mohd
- (Malaysia) Norsyafiq Sumantri
- (Pakistan) Arshad Liaqat
- (South Africa) Trevor de Lora
- (South Africa) Senswesihle Ngubane

Source: FIH

== See also ==
- 2022 Sultan of Johor Cup
