= Nilakanta Sharma =

Indian field hockey player

Personal information
- Full name: Nilakanta Sharma
- Born: 2 May 1995 (age 31) Imphal East, Manipur, India
- Height: 1.63 m (5 ft 4 in)

Sport
- Sport: Field hockey
- Position: Midfielder
- Club: India Youth Affairs and Sports Manipur
–	India Youth Affairs and Sports Manipur	-	-
National team
Years	Team	Caps	Goals
2014–16	India U21	11	(4)
2017–	India	168	(31)
Medal record
Men's field hockey
Representing India
Olympic Games
Bronze medal – third place	2020 Tokyo	Team
Asian Games
Gold medal – first place	2022 Hangzhou	Team
Gold medal – first place	2026 Aichi-Nagoya	Team
Commonwealth Games
Silver medal – second place	2022 Birmingham	Team
Asian Champions Trophy
Gold medal – first place	2018 Muscat
Gold medal – first place	2023 Chennai
Gold medal – first place	2024 Hulunbuir
Gold medal – first place	2026 Punjab
Junior World Cup
Gold medal – first place	2016 Lucknow
Junior Asia Cup
Gold medal – first place	2015 Kuantan

Nilakanta Sharma Shanglakpam (born 2 May 1995) is an Indian field hockey player who played as a midfielder for the Indian national team.

He was part of the Indian squad that won the 2016 Men's Hockey Junior World Cup. He won gold medals at 2022 and 2026 Asian Games.

== Career ==
Hailing from Kontha Ahallup Makha Leikai in Imphal East, Nilakanta started playing hockey in 2003. He played for Posterior Hockey Academy Manipur until 2011 when he switched to Bhopal Hockey Academy. He was selected for the national junior team for the 2014 Sultan of Johor Cup and drafted by the Dabang Mumbai franchise of the Hockey India League.
