= Hardik Singh =

Indian field hockey player

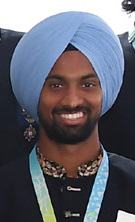
- Singh in 2022

Personal information
- Full name: Hardik Singh Rai
- Born: 23 September 1998 (age 28) Khusropur, Punjab, India
- Height: 1.76 m (5 ft 9 in)

Sport
- Sport: Field hockey
- Position: Midfielder
- Club: Punjab Civil Secretariat
Senior career
Years	Team	Caps	Goals
–	Petroleum Sports Promotion Board	-	-
–	Indian Oil Corporation	-	-
–	Punjab Civil Secretariat	-	-
National team
Years	Team	Caps	Goals
2014	India U21	4	(0)
2016	India U18		-
2018–	India	200	(18)
Medal record
Men's field hockey
Representing India
Olympic Games
Bronze medal – third place	2020 Tokyo	Team
Bronze medal – third place	2024 Paris	Team
Commonwealth Games
Silver medal – second place	2022 Birmingham	Team
Asian Games
Gold medal – first place	2022 Hangzhou	Team
Gold medal – first place	2026 Aichi-Nagoya	Team
Asia Cup
Gold medal – first place	2025 Rajgir
Asian Champions Trophy
Gold medal – first place	2018 Muscat
Gold medal – first place	2023 Chennai
Gold medal – first place	2026 Punjab
Bronze medal – third place	2021 Dhaka
Boys' Asia Cup
Gold medal – first place	2016 Dhaka

Hardik Singh (born 23 September 1998) is an Indian field hockey player who plays as a midfielder for the Indian national team.

== Early life ==
Singh's father was Varinderpreet Singh Rai, who works as a police officer, played for India. His grandfather Preetam Singh Rai was a hockey coach with the Indian Navy. Hardik played hockey as a youngster in his village Khusropur under the tutelage of his grandfather. Like his uncles Gurmail Singh and Jugraj Singh, both former internationals, Hardik began playing as a defender in the wings. He took up hockey seriously in 2012 and joined the Punjab Institute of Sports Academy in Mohali before moving to Surjit Hockey Academy in Jalandhar.

Hardik's aunt Rajbir Kaur also played internationally for India while her husband Gurmail Singh was a part of gold medal-winning Indian team at the 1980 Moscow Olympics Hardik is a fifth-generation hockey player in the family. He regards his uncle Jugraj Singh as his mentor, and credits him for persuading Hardik to stay back when he decided to move to the Netherlands after opportunities in India seemed to dry up for him as an 18-year-old.

== International career ==
=== 2018–2022: Debut and Olympics bronze ===
After becoming the vice-captain of the Indian youth team, Singh made his senior international debut at the 2018 Asian Champions Trophy held in Muscat. His first match was India's opening fixture against Oman on 18 October; India won 11–0. Finalists India and Pakistan were declared joint-winners after the match was abandoned due to rain.

Singh was included in India's squad for the 2020 Tokyo Olympics. He scored his first goal of the competition in the quarter-final against Great Britain. Singh's 57th-minute counter-attacking goal helped India secure a 3–1 win, and an entry into the medal-round for the first time since the 1980 Moscow Olympics. A semi-final loss to Belgium was followed by bronze-medal finish after a win against Germany. Singh scored once in the eventual 5–3 win. He scored off a loose ball from a penalty corner in the second quarter to give his team a 2–1 lead.

In the 2022 Birmingham Commonwealth Games, Singh was a part of the India team that finished second. His team had an undefeated run leading up to the final, where they lost 7–0 to Australia. He recalled the game being "a big test" for him and that he wanted to "focus more on controlling the tempo of the game and build on leadership qualities." At the Hockey India Awards, Singh was awarded the Balbir Singh Sr. Award for Player of The Year for 2022.

=== 2023–present ===
Singh was named in India's squad for the 2023 World Cup. In its profiling, ESPN called him "India's engine in the middle of the park. Non-stop running leads India's pressing, and sublime passer." He scored in India's opening game against Spain in a 2–0 win. In the next group stage match, against England, Singh sustained a hamstring injury leading him to miss the rest of the tournament. In July that year, Singh played his 100th match for India, against England, in the 100th Anniversary Spanish Hockey Federation tournament in Barcelona, Spain.

Singh was part of the side that finished first in both the Asian Champions Trophy and the Hangzhou Asian Games, both played in 2023. Recognizing his performances in these successes, Singh was awarded the FIH Player of the Year (Male).
