= Lee Hye-seung =

South Korean field hockey player

Personal information
- Born: 22 June 1999 (age 27) South Korea
- Height: 185 cm (6 ft 1 in)

Sport
- Sport: Field hockey
- Position: Defence
National team
Years	Team	Caps	Goals
2021–	South Korea	34	(1)
Medal record
Men's field hockey
Representing South Korea
Asian Games
Bronze medal – third place	2022 Hangzhou	Team
Asian Cup
Gold medal – first place	2022 Jakarta
Silver medal – second place	2025 Rajgir
Asian Champions Trophy
Gold medal – first place	2021 Dhaka
Sultan Azlan Shah Cup
Silver medal – second place	2022 Ipoh

Lee Hye-seung (이혜승, born 22 June 1999) is a field hockey player from South Korea, who plays as a defender.

== Career ==
=== Senior national team ===
Lee made his senior international debut in 2021.

Throughout his career he has medalled with the national team on numerous occasions, winning gold at the 2021 Asian Champions Trophy in Dhaka, and the 2022 Asian Cup in Jakarta. He also won silver at the 2022 edition of the Sultan Azlan Shah Cup.

In 2023, Lee was named to the national team for the FIH World Cup in Bhubaneswar and Rourkela, as well as the Asian Games in Hangzhou.
