= Vivek Prasad =

Indian field hockey player

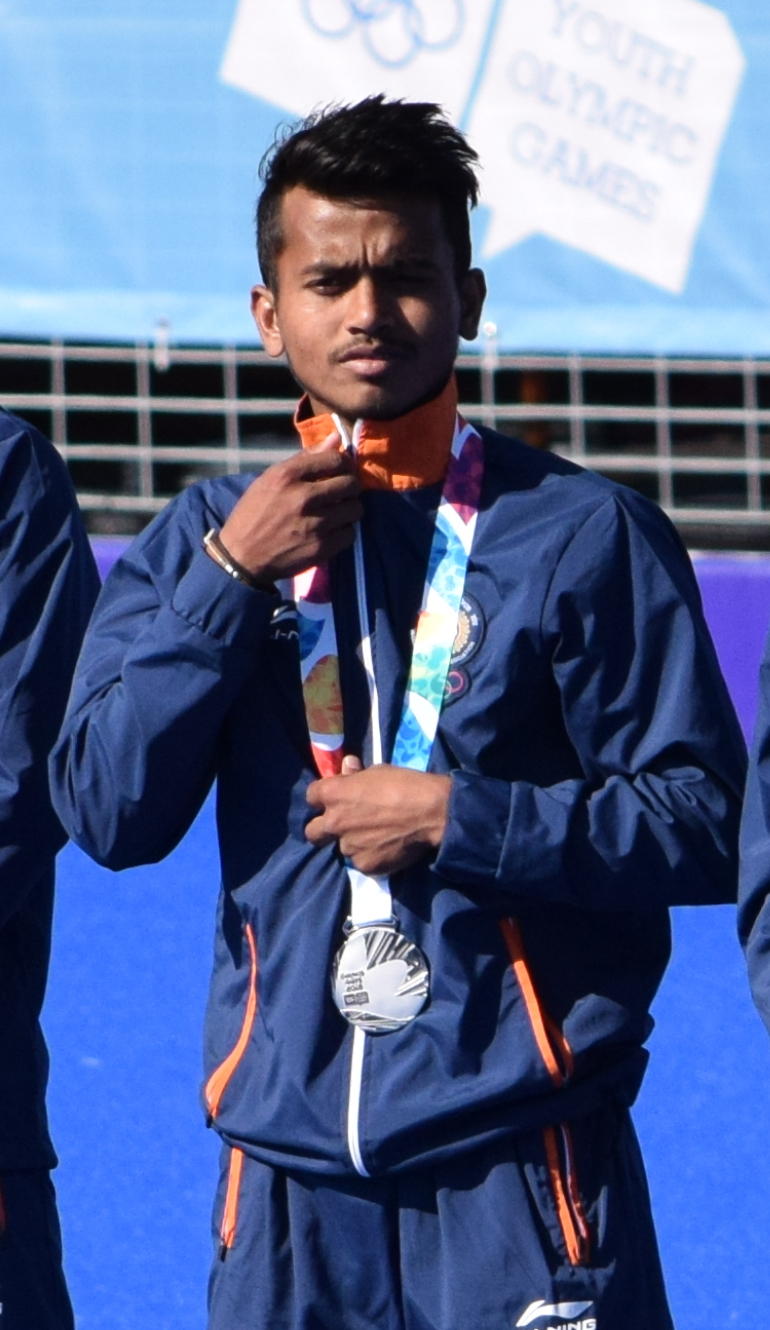
- Prasad at the 2018 Youth Olympics

Personal information
- Full name: Vivek Sagar Prasad
- Born: 25 February 2000 (age 26) Itarsi, Madhya Pradesh, India

Sport
- Sport: Field hockey
- Position: Midfielder
- Club: Madhya Pradesh Police
Senior career
| Years | Team | Caps | Goals |
| – | Bharat Petroleum Corporation Limited | - | - |
| – | Madhya Pradesh Police | - | - |
National team
| Years | Team | Caps | Goals |
| 2017–2021 | India U21 | 12 | (3) |
| 2018– | India U18 Hockey5s | 14 | (24) |
| 2018– | India | 210 | (24) |
Medal record
Men's Field hockey Hockey5s
Representing India
Olympic Games
| Bronze medal – third place | 2020 Tokyo | Team |
| Bronze medal – third place | 2024 Paris | Team |
Champions Trophy
| Silver medal – second place | 2018 Breda |
Commonwealth Games
| Silver medal – second place | 2022 Birmingham | Team |
Asian Games
| Gold medal – first place | 2022 Hangzhou | Team |
| Gold medal – first place | 2026 Aichi-Nagoya | Team |
| Bronze medal – third place | 2018 Jakarta | Team |
Asia Cup
| Gold medal – first place | 2025 Rajgir |
Asian Champions Trophy
| Gold medal – first place | 2023 Chennai |
| Gold medal – first place | 2024 Hulunbuir |
| Gold medal – first place | 2026 Punjab |
Youth Olympic Games
| Silver medal – second place | 2018 Buenos Aires | Team |

Vivek Sagar Prasad (born 25 February 2000) is an Indian field hockey player. He plays as a midfielder for the Indian national team. He has won bronze medals at the 2020 and 2024 Olympics.

In January 2018, he became the second-youngest player ever to debut for India at 17 years, 10 months and 22 days. At the 2019 Hockey Stars Awards, Prasad was named the FIH Rising Star of the Year. At the 2020-21 FIH Player of the Year Awards, he was named the FIH Young Player of the Year.

== Early life ==
Prasad was born in the village of Shivnagar Chandon near Itarsi town in Madhya Pradesh.

When he was young, he liked to play chess, badminton and cricket and it was only by chance that he got introduced to hockey around 2010-11 when the local hockey coach offered to train the students who wanted to try out the sport.

Hockey soon captured the young Prasad's imagination. Even in his spare time, he practiced in a small corner near his house and found himself playing beyond the school level in a few months. While playing at a local senior-level tournament in Akola in 2013, he caught the eye of Ashok Kumar (field hockey), who scored the winning goal in the 1975 Hockey World Cup final and is the son of Indian legend Dhyan Chand.

After the match, he was offered a placement at Ashok Kumar (field hockey) MP Hockey Academy in Bhopal. The talented midfielder grabbed the opportunity with both hands and honed his skills at Ashok Kumar's institute for the next few years.

== International career ==
Prasad scored the equalizing goal for India in the 42nd minute in the final of the 2018 Champions Trophy against Australia, a match that India went on to lose in the penalties. At the 2019 FIH Series Finals in Bhubaneswar, Prasad was named the best young player at the tournament. In December 2019, he was nominated for the FIH Rising Star of the Year Award. He won the award by getting 34.5 per cent of the votes and he became the first Indian player to win an FIH Award. He was part of the Indian team that won the bronze medal at the 2020 Olympic Games. Finally he won gold medal in 2022 Asian Games in Hangzhou.

=== Junior Hockey ===
Prasad, who hails from Madhya Pradesh, made an impressive start to his career in the Junior India side. He Captained the team which took part at the 2017 Sultan of Johor Cup, where he led his side to the Bronze Medal . He won the Player of the Tournament award and caught the eye of erstwhile Indian senior coach Sjoerd Marijne.A national camp call up followed.

Prasad led the Indian under-18 hockey5s team at the 2018 Summer Youth Olympics. Not only did he play an important role in the midfield but he was also India's joint-highest goal-scorer for India in the tournament. In the final against Malaysia, Vivek Sagar Prasad scored twice but India went on to lose 4-2 and settled for silver.

He also captain Indian team at the 2021 Men's FIH Hockey Junior World Cup where they lost Bronze medal match with france and secure 4th position.

| Preceded by Arthur De Sloover | FIH Rising Star of the Year; 2019 | Most recent |
