= Genki Mitani =

Japanese field hockey player (born 1990)

Personal information
- Born: 12 June 1990 (age 36) Echizen, Japan
- Height: 1.81 m (5 ft 11 in)

Sport
- Sport: Field hockey
- Position: Midfielder
- Club: Vercosta Fukui
National team
Years	Team	Caps	Goals
–	Japan	168	(6)
Medal record
Men's field hockey
Representing Japan
Asian Games
Gold medal – first place	2018 Jakarta	Team
Silver medal – second place	2022 Hangzhou	Team
Asian Champions Trophy
Bronze medal – third place	2023 Chennai

Genki Mitani (三谷 元騎, Mitanki Genki) (born 12 June 1990) is a Japanese field hockey player. He competed in the 2020 Summer Olympics.

He was a part of the Japan squad which won their first Asian Games gold medal in hockey in 2018.
