= Sukhjeet Singh =

Indian field hockey player

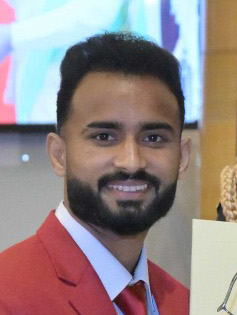
- Singh in 2025

Personal information
- Born: 5 December 1996 (age 29) Jalandhar, Punjab, India

Sport
- Sport: Field hockey
- Position: Forward
- Club: Punjab National Bank
Senior career
Years	Team	Caps	Goals
–	Punjab National Bank	-	-
National team
Years	Team	Caps	Goals
2022–	India	144	(55)
Medal record
Men's field hockey
Representing India
Olympic Games
Bronze medal – third place	2024 Paris	Team
Asian Games
Gold medal – first place	2022 Hangzhou	Team
Gold medal – first place	2026 Aichi-Nagoya	Team
Asia Cup
Gold medal – first place	2025 Rajgir
Asian Champions Trophy
Gold medal – first place	2023 Chennai
Gold medal – first place	2024 Hulunbuir
Gold medal – first place	2026 Punjab

Sukhjeet Singh (born 5 December 1996) is an Indian field hockey player. He was part of the Indian team that won the bronze medal at the 2024 Paris Olympics. He is a recipient of the Arjuna Award.

== Early life and background ==
He was born in Jawandpur village in Taran Taran district. After his father's selection in the Punjab police, the family settled in Jalandhar. His father Ajit Singh was also a field hockey player. He was admitted to the state run hockey academy in Mohali when he was eight years old. Sukhjeet started playing hockey at the age of six. He is selected to be part of the Indian team at the 2024 Summer Olympics where he will make his Olympic debut.

== Career ==
After short stints with Indian Oil, Sindh Bank, and Punjab Police, he was selected for the Punjab National Bank team in 2017. In 2018, he was selected for the national side, but sustained a back injury which left him unable to join.

He made his debut for the Indian team at the 2022–23 Men's FIH Pro League in India's match against Spain. He scored six goals in the tournament.

He played for India in the 2023 World Cup, scoring three goals in the tournament. He also played in the 2022 Asian Games, where India went on to win the gold medal. He has been selected for the Indian squad in the 2023–24 Men's FIH Pro League.

In June 2024, he got selected for the Indian hockey team that will play in 2024 Paris Olympics in July.
