= Abhishek Nain =

Indian field hockey player (born 1999)

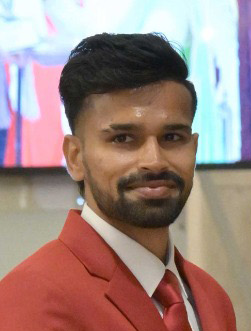
- Nain in 2025

Personal information
- Born: 15 August 1999 (age 27) Sonipat, Haryana, India
- Height: 1.76 m (5 ft 9 in)

Sport
- Sport: Field hockey
- Position: Forward
Senior career
Years	Team	Caps	Goals
2024–	Rarh Bengal Tigers	-	-
National team
Years	Team	Caps	Goals
2016–	India U18		-
2017–2018	India U21	12	(6)
2022–	India	152	(69)
Medal record
Men's field hockey
Representing India
Olympic Games
Bronze medal – third place	2024 Paris	Team
Commonwealth Games
Silver medal – second place	2022 Birmingham	Team
Asian Games
Gold medal – first place	2022 Hangzhou	Team
Gold medal – first place	2026 Aichi-Nagoya	Team
Asia Cup
Gold medal – first place	2025 Rajgir
Asian Champions Trophy
Gold medal – first place	2024 Hulunbuir
Gold medal – first place	2026 Punjab
Sultan of Johor Cup
Silver medal – second place	2018 Johor
Bronze medal – third place	2017 Johor
Boys' Asia Cup
Gold medal – first place	2016 Dhaka

Abhishek Nain (born 15 August 1999) is an Indian field hockey player who plays as a forward in the national team. Nain plays for Rarh Bengal Tigers in the Hockey India League.

== Early life ==
Nain was born on 15 August 1999 in Sonipat to mother Soorat Devi and father Satnarayan Nain, who is a special police officer. He has an elder brother named Ashish. Nain first started playing the sport of hockey when he was in third grade.

== Career ==
Nain made his international debut for in Feb 2022 at the 2021–22 Pro League. He was a part of the team that won the gold medal at the 2022 Asian Games. He was a part of the bronze medal-winning team at the 2024 Paris Olympics. Nain was also a part of the team that won the 2024 Asian Champions Trophy. He was the second most expensive player at Hockey India League auctions for the 2024–25 season. Rarh Bengal Tigers bought him for ₹72 lakhs. He won the best player's award in the 2025 Men's Hockey Asia Cup.

In the semi-final match against Pakistan in the 2026 Asian Games, he put a last minute goal with 45 seconds remaining on the clock, that sent India to the final by the margin of 4–3.

== Awards and nominations ==
Year	Award	Category	Result	Ref.
2023	Hockey India Awards	Forward of the Year	Won	
2024	Indian Sports Honours	Breakthrough Performance of the Year Male	Nominated	
2025	Arjuna Award	Outstanding Performance in Sports	Won	
2025	Hockey India Awards	Forward of the Year	Won	
2025	Hockey India Awards	Player of the Year Male	Nominated	
