= Shello Silverius =

Personal information
- Born: 3 April 1999 (age 27) Keningau, Sabah, Malaysia

Sport
- Sport: Field hockey
- Position: Forward
National team
| Years | Team | Caps | Goals |
| 2021– | Malaysia | 121 | (33) |
Medal record
Men's field hockey
Representing Malaysia
Asian Games
| Silver medal – second place | 2026 Aichi-Nagoya | Team |
Asia Cup
| Silver medal – second place | 2022 Jakarta |
| Bronze medal – third place | 2025 Rajgir |
Asian Champions Trophy
| Silver medal – second place | 2023 Chennai |
| Bronze medal – third place | 2026 Punjab |
- Updated on 6 November 2026

Shello Silverius (born 3 April 1999) is a Malaysian field hockey player who plays as a forward.

== Early life ==
He was born on 3 April 1999 in Keningau, Sabah. He played various sports before focusing on hockey at the age of 12. In 2012, he joined Sekolah Sukan Tunku Mahkota Ismail, the national junior training school, in Johor.

== Career ==
In 2019, he became the first player from East Malaysia to captain the national junior team.

He made his international debut for Malaysia in 2021. He was the Player of the Tournament at the 2022 Sultan Azlan Shah Cup, when Malaysia won the tournament for the first time since its inception in 1983.
