= Ken Nagayoshi =

Japanese male field hockey player

Personal information
- Born: 26 October 1999 (age 26) Tochigi, Japan
- Height: 1.70 m (5 ft 7 in)

Sport
- Sport: Field hockey
- Position: Midfielder
- Club: Tenri University Bears
National team
Years	Team	Caps	Goals
2018–	Japan	22	(0)
Medal record
Men's field hockey
Representing Japan
Asian Games
Silver medal – second place	2022 Hangzhou	Team
Asian Champions Trophy
Silver medal – second place	2021 Dhaka
Bronze medal – third place	2023 Chennai
- Updated on 31 December 2021

Ken Nagayoshi (永吉 拳, Nagayoshi Ken, born 26 October 1999) is a Japanese field hockey player who plays as a midfielder for the Tenri University Bears and the Japanese national team.

He represented Japan at the 2020 Summer Olympics.
