= Yuma Nagai =

Japanese field hockey player

Personal information
- Born: 18 March 1996 (age 30) Gifu Prefecture, Japan
- Height: 1.62 m (5 ft 4 in)

Sport
- Sport: Field hockey
- Position: Midfielder
- Club: Gifu Asahi Club
National team
Years	Team	Caps	Goals
2019–	Japan	11	(0)
Medal record
Men's field hockey
Representing Japan
Asian Games
Silver medal – second place	2022 Hangzhou	Team
Asian Champions Trophy
Bronze medal – third place	2023 Chennai

Yuma Nagai (永井 祐真, Nagai Yūma, born 18 March 1996) is a Japanese field hockey player. He competed in the 2020 Summer Olympics.
