= Ryosei Kato =

Japanese field hockey player (born 1997)

Personal information
- Born: 19 August 1997 (age 28) Oyabe, Toyama Japan
- Height: 178 cm (5 ft 10 in)

Sport
- Sport: Field hockey
- Position: Forward
National team
Years	Team	Caps	Goals
2019–	Japan	48	(17)
Medal record
Men's field hockey
Representing Japan
Asian Games
Silver medal – second place	2022 Hangzhou	Team
FIH Hockey Series
Bronze medal – third place	2018–19 Le Touquet	Team
Asian Champions Trophy
Silver medal – second place	2021 Dhaka	Team
Bronze medal – third place	2023 Chennai	Team

Ryosei Kato (加藤 凌聖, born 19 August 1997) is a field hockey player from Japan, who plays as a forward.

== Career ==
=== Senior national team ===
Kato made his senior international debut in 2019.

Since his debut, Kato has medalled with the national team on numerous occasions. He won bronze at the FIH Series Finals in Bhubaneswar. He has also medalled twice at the Asian Champions Trophies, winning silver at the 2021 edition in Dhaka, followed by bronze at the 2023 edition in Chennai.

In 2023, Ooka was named to the national team for the FIH World Cup in Bhubaneswar and Rourkela, as well as the Asian Games in Hangzhou. At the Asian Games, he won a silver medal.
