= Shota Yamada =

Japanese field hockey player

Personal information
- Born: 21 December 1994 (age 31) Maibara, Japan
- Height: 1.77 m (5 ft 10 in)

Sport
- Sport: Field hockey
- Position: Defender
- Club: Gifu Asahi Club
National team
Years	Team	Caps	Goals
2016–present	Japan	115	(33)
Medal record
Men's field hockey
Representing Japan
Asian Games
Gold medal – first place	2018 Jakarta	Team
Silver medal – second place	2022 Hangzhou	Team
Asian Champions Trophy
Silver medal – second place	2021 Dhaka
Bronze medal – third place	2023 Chennai
- Updated on 25 December 2021

Shota Yamada (山田 翔太, Yamada Shōta, born 21 December 1994) is a Japanese field hockey player. He competed in the 2020 Summer Olympics.

He was a part of the Japan squad which won their first Asian Games gold medal in men's hockey in 2018.
