= Faiz Jali =

Malaysian field hockey player

Personal information
- Full name: Faiz Helmi Jali
- Born: 18 February 1992 (age 34) Batu Pahat, Johor, Malaysia

Sport
- Sport: Field hockey
- Position: Defence
National team
Years	Team	Caps	Goals
2011–2013	Malaysia U–21	47	(0)
2012–	Malaysia	273	(13)
Medal record
Men's field hockey
Representing Malaysia
Asian Games
Silver medal – second place	2018 Jakarta	Team
Asian Cup
Silver medal – second place	2017 Dhaka	Team
Silver medal – second place	2022 Jakarta	Team
Bronze medal – third place	2025 Rajgir	Team
FIH Champions Challenge I
Bronze medal – third place	2014 Kuantan	Team
FIH Hockey Series
Silver medal – second place	2018–19 Kuala Lumpur	Team
SEA Games
Gold medal – first place	2017 Kuala Lumpur	Team
Asian Champions Trophy
Silver medal – second place	2023 Chennai	Team
Bronze medal – third place	2012 Doha	Team
Bronze medal – third place	2016 Kuantan	Team
Bronze medal – third place	2018 Muscat	Team
Sultan of Johor Cup
Gold medal – first place	2011 Johor Bahru	Team
Silver medal – second place	2013 Johor Bahru	Team

Faiz Helmi Jali (born 18 February 1992) is a Malaysian field hockey player.

== Education ==
Jali is a former student of the University of Malaya.

== Field hockey ==
=== Domestic league ===
In the Malaysia Hockey League, Jali has represented both Johor and Tenaga Nasional Berhad.

=== Under–21 ===
Jali made his international debut at under–21 level. He represented the Malaysian U–21 team at two editions of the Sultan of Johor Cup in Johor Bahru, in 2011 and 2013, winning gold and silver medals, respectively. He was also a member of the national under–21 squad at the 2013 FIH Junior World Cup in New Delhi.

=== Malaysian Tigers ===
In 2012, Jali made his senior international debut. He earned his first senior international cap for the Malaysian Tigers during a match against Japan the Asian Champions Trophy in Doha, where he eventually won a bronze medal.

Jali is one of the longest serving members of the national squad, with his career spanning 12 years as of 2026. During this time, he has become one of four Malaysian players to appear at four editions of the FIH World Cup, including 2014 in The Hague, 2018 in Bhubaneswar, 2023 in Bhubaneswar and Rourkela, and 2026 in Amsterdam and Wavre.

Major International Tournaments
The following is a list of major international tournaments in which Jali has participated.

- 2012 Asian Champions Trophy – Doha
- 2013 Asian Cup – Ipoh
- 2012–13 FIH World League
- 2014 FIH Champions Challenge I – Kuantan
- 2014 FIH World Cup – The Hague
- XX Commonwealth Games – Glasgow
- 2014 Asian Games – Incheon
- 2014–15 FIH World League
- 2016 Asian Champions Trophy – Kuantan
- 2016–17 FIH World League
- 2017 SEA Games – Kuala Lumpur
- 2017 Asian Cup – Dhaka
- 2018 Asian Games – Jakarta
- 2018 Asian Champions Trophy – Muscat
- 2018 FIH World Cup – Bhubaneswar
- 2018–19 FIH Series Finals – Kuala Lumpur
- 2022 Asian Cup – Jakarta
- 2022 FIH Nations Cup – Potchefstroom
- 2023 FIH World Cup – Bhubaneswar and Rourkela
- 2023 Asian Champions Trophy – Chennai
- 2022 Asian Games – Hangzhou
- 2024 Asian Champions Trophy – Hulunbuir
- 2024–25 FIH Nations Cup – Kuala Lumpur
- 2025 Asian Cup – Rajgir
- 2025 SEA Games – Bangkok
- 2025–26 FIH Nations Cup – Cape Town
- 2026 FIH World Cup – Amsterdam and Wavre
