= Waheed Rana =

Pakistani field hockey player

Personal information
- Full name: Abdul Waheed Ashraf Rana
- Born: 4 February 2000 (age 26) Sargodha, Punjab, Pakistan
- Height: 178 cm (5 ft 10 in)
- Weight: 72 kg (159 lb)

Sport
- Sport: Field hockey
- Position: Forward
National team
Years	Team	Caps	Goals
2019–	Pakistan	84	(39)
2021	Pakistan U–21	6	(7)
Medal record
Men's field hockey
Representing Pakistan
Asian Games
Bronze medal – third place	2026 Aichi-Nagoya	Team
Sultan Azlan Shah Cup
Silver medal – second place	2024 Ipoh
Bronze medal – third place	2022 Ipoh

Abdul Waheed Ashraf Rana (born 4 February 2000) is a Pakistani field hockey player.

== Career ==
=== Under–21 ===
Rana made his under–21 international debut in 2021, captaining the national team at the FIH Junior World Cup in Bhubaneswar.

=== Senior national team ===
Waheed Rana made his senior international debut in 2019 in a test series against Germany in Mönchengladbach. He followed this up with an appearance at the FIH Olympic Qualifiers in Amsterdam.

In 2021 he was a member of the squad at the Asian Champions Trophy in Dhaka.

Rana had a very successful 2022, competing at numerous major tournaments. He appeared at the Asian Cup in Jakarta, the Commonwealth Games in Birmingham, the Sultan Azlan Shah Cup in Ipoh and the inaugural edition of the FIH Nations Cup in Potchefstroom.

He continued his form in 2023, representing the national team at the Asian Champions Trophy in Chennai and the Asian Games in Hangzhou.

He was a member of the squad at the 2024 FIH Olympic Qualifiers in Muscat and the silver medal-winning side at the 2024 Sultan Azlan Shah Cup in Ipoh. He also appeared at the 2023–24 FIH Nations Cup in Gniezno.
