= Kentaro Fukuda =

Japanese field hockey player

Personal information
- Born: 27 July 1995 (age 31) Shimane Prefecture, Japan
- Height: 1.74 m (5 ft 9 in)

Sport
- Sport: Field hockey
- Position: Forward
- Club: Real Club de Polo
National team
Years	Team	Caps	Goals
2016–	Japan	107	(29)
Medal record
Men's field hockey
Representing Japan
Asian Games
Gold medal – first place	2018 Jakarta	Team
Silver medal – second place	2022 Hangzhou	Team
Asian Champions Trophy
Bronze medal – third place	2023 Chennai

Kentaro Fukuda (福田 健太郎, Fukuda Kentarō, born 27 July 1995) is a Japanese field hockey player who plays as a forward for Real Club de Polo and the Japan national team.

== International career ==
Fukuda was a part of the Japan squad which won their first Asian Games gold medal in hockey in 2018. He represented Japan at the 2020 Summer Olympics.
