= Abu Kamal Azrai =

Malaysian field hockey player

Azrai Abu Kamal
Personal information
- Full name: Muhammad Azrai Aizad Abu Kamal
- Born: 3 October 1999 (age 26) Malaysia Ipoh Perak

Sport
- Sport: Field hockey
- Position: Forward
Senior career
Years	Team	Caps	Goals
–	Tenaga Nasional Berhad	-	-
National team
Years	Team	Caps	Goals
2017–2018	Malaysia U–21	12	(9)
2019–	Malaysia	75	(28)
Medal record
Men's field hockey
Representing Malaysia
Asian Cup
Silver medal – second place	2022 Jakarta
Bronze medal – third place	2025 Rajgir
FIH Hockey Series
Silver medal – second place	2018–19 Kuala Lumpur	Team
Asian Champions Trophy
Silver medal – second place	2023 Chennai
Sultan Azlan Shah Cup
Gold medal – first place	2022 Ipoh
Bronze medal – third place	2019 Ipoh

Muhammad Azrai Aizad Abu Kamal (born 3 October 1999) is a Malaysian field hockey player.

== Career ==
=== Domestic league ===
In the Malaysia Hockey League, Abu Kamal represents Tenaga Nasional Berhad.

=== Under–21 ===
Abu Kamal made his international debut at under–21 level. He represented the Malaysian U–21 team at the 2017 Sultan of Johor Cup in Johor Bahru.

In 2018 he appeared at his second Sultan of Johor Cup.

=== National team ===
Abu Kamal received his first call-up to the Malaysian Tigers in 2019. He appeared at the Azlan Shah Cup in Ipoh and the FIH Series Finals in Kuala Lumpur, winning bronze and silver medals, respectively.

Since his debut, Abu Kamal has been a regular inclusion in the national squad. He has won silver medals at the 2022 Asian Cup in Jakarta and the 2023 Asian Champions Trophy in Chennai, as well as gold at the 2022 Sultan Azlan Shah Cup in Ipoh.

In recent years he has become a threat in the Malaysian forward line, recognised as one of the teams best goalscorers.

==== International goals ====
Goal	Date	Location	Opponent	Score	Result	Competition	Ref.
1	30 March 2019	Azlan Shah Stadium, Ipoh, Malaysia	Canada	2–1	4–2	2019 Sultan Azlan Shah Cup	
2	26 April 2019	National Hockey Stadium, Kuala Lumpur, Malaysia	Brazil	5–0	6–0	2018–19 FIH Series Finals	
3	5 October 2021	Lisnagarvey Hockey Club, Royal Hillsborough, Ireland	Ireland	1–2	2–3	Test Match	
4	6 October 2021	Lisnagarvey Hockey Club, Royal Hillsborough, Ireland	Ireland	3–1	4–2	Test Match	
5	4 November 2022	Azlan Shah Stadium, Ipoh, Malaysia	South Africa	4–1	7–2	2022 Sultan Azlan Shah Cup	
6	29 November 2022	NWU Astro, Potchefstroom, South Africa	Canada	2–2	3–2	2022 FIH Nations Cup	
7	29 November 2022	NWU Astro, Potchefstroom, South Africa	Canada	3–2	3–2	2022 FIH Nations Cup	
8	4 August 2023	Mayor Radhakrishnan Stadium, Chennai, India	China	2–1	5–1	2023 Asian Champions Trophy	
9	9 August 2023	Mayor Radhakrishnan Stadium, Chennai, India	South Korea	1–0	1–0	2023 Asian Champions Trophy	
10	11 August 2023	Mayor Radhakrishnan Stadium, Chennai, India	South Korea	1–1	6–2	2023 Asian Champions Trophy	
11	12 August 2023	Mayor Radhakrishnan Stadium, Chennai, India	India	1–1	3–4	2023 Asian Champions Trophy	
12	24 September 2023	Gongshu Canal Sports Park, Hangzhou, China	Thailand	1–0	9–0	2022 Asian Games	
13	24 September 2023	Gongshu Canal Sports Park, Hangzhou, China	Thailand	5–0	9–0	2022 Asian Games	
14	26 September 2023	Gongshu Canal Sports Park, Hangzhou, China	Oman	6–1	11–1	2022 Asian Games	
15	26 September 2023	Gongshu Canal Sports Park, Hangzhou, China	Oman	10–1	11–1	2022 Asian Games	
16	28 September 2023	Gongshu Canal Sports Park, Hangzhou, China	Indonesia	7–1	9–2	2022 Asian Games	
17	2 October 2023	Gongshu Canal Sports Park, Hangzhou, China	China	1–1	4–4	2022 Asian Games	
18	15 January 2024	Hockey Oman, Muscat, Oman	China	1–0	2–3	2024 FIH Olympic Qualifiers	
19	18 January 2024	Hockey Oman, Muscat, Oman	Pakistan	2–1	3–3	2024 FIH Olympic Qualifiers	
20	20 January 2024	Hockey Oman, Muscat, Oman	Chile	5–0	5–0	2024 FIH Olympic Qualifiers	
21	4 May 2024	Azlan Shah Stadium, Ipoh, Malaysia	Pakistan	1–1	4–5	2024 Sultan Azlan Shah Cup	
22	4 May 2024	Azlan Shah Stadium, Ipoh, Malaysia	Pakistan	2–1	4–5	2024 Sultan Azlan Shah Cup	
23	4 May 2024	Azlan Shah Stadium, Ipoh, Malaysia	Pakistan	3–1	4–5	2024 Sultan Azlan Shah Cup	
24	5 May 2024	Azlan Shah Stadium, Ipoh, Malaysia	Canada	2–1	6–2	2024 Sultan Azlan Shah Cup	
25	7 May 2024	Azlan Shah Stadium, Ipoh, Malaysia	New Zealand	2–0	6–4	2024 Sultan Azlan Shah Cup	
26	7 May 2024	Azlan Shah Stadium, Ipoh, Malaysia	New Zealand	4–0	6–4	2024 Sultan Azlan Shah Cup	
27	7 May 2024	Azlan Shah Stadium, Ipoh, Malaysia	New Zealand	6–3	6–4	2024 Sultan Azlan Shah Cup	
28	11 May 2024	Azlan Shah Stadium, Ipoh, Malaysia	New Zealand	1–0	2–3	2024 Sultan Azlan Shah Cup	
