= Khusropur =

- Village
- Location in Punjab, India Khusropur (India)
- Coordinates: 31.250182°N 75.384938°E
- Country: India
- State: Punjab
- District: Kapurthala

Government
  - Type: Panchayati raj (India)
  - Body: Gram panchayat

Population (2011)
  - Total: 884
- Sex ratio 479/405♂/♀

Languages
  - Official: Punjabi
  - Other spoken: Hindi
- Time zone: UTC+5:30 (IST)
- PIN: 144625
- Telephone code: 01822
- ISO 3166 code: IN-PB
- Vehicle registration: PB-09
- Website: kapurthala.gov.in

Khusropur is a village in Kapurthala district of Punjab State, India. It is located 18 kilometres (11 mi) from Kapurthala, which is both district and sub-district headquarters of Khusropur. The village is administrated by a Sarpanch who is an elected representative of village.

== Demography ==
According to the report published by Census India in 2011, Khusropur has 169 houses with the total population of 884 persons of which 479 are male and 405 females. Literacy rate of Khusropur is 74.43%, lower than the state average of 75.84%. The population of children in the age group 0–6 years is 94 which is 10.63% of the total population. Child sex ratio is approximately 709, lower than the state average of 846.

== Population data ==
Particulars	Total	Male	Female
Total No. of Houses	169	-	-
Population	884	479	405
Child (0-6)	94	55	39
Schedule Caste	251	136	115
Schedule Tribe	0	0	0
Literacy	74.43 %	78.77 %	69.40 %
Total Workers	424	304	120
Main Worker	360	0	0
Marginal Worker	64	37	27
