= Seren Tanaka =

Japanese field hockey player (born 1992)

Personal information
- Born: 9 November 1992 (age 33) Shimane Prefecture, Japan
- Height: 1.74 m (5 ft 9 in)

Sport
- Sport: Field hockey
- Position: Midfielder
- Club: Gifu Asahi Club
National team
Years	Team	Caps	Goals
2016–present	Japan	116	(9)
Medal record
Men's field hockey
Representing Japan
Asian Games
Gold medal – first place	2018 Jakarta	Team
Silver medal – second place	2022 Hangzhou	Team
Asian Champions Trophy
Silver medal – second place	2021 Dhaka
Bronze medal – third place	2023 Chennai
- Updated on 31 December 2021

Seren Tanaka (田中 世蓮, Tanaka Seren, born 9 November 1992) is a Japanese field hockey player. He competed in the 2020 Summer Olympics.

He was a part of the Japan squad which won their first Asian Games gold medal in hockey in 2018.
