= Field hockey at the 2018 Asian Games – Men's tournament =

Men's field hockey tournament at the 2018 Asian Games
Tournament details
- Host country: Indonesia
- City: Jakarta
- Dates: 20 August – 1 September
- Teams: 12 (from 1 confederation)
- Venue: Gelora Bung Karno Hockey Field

Final positions
- Champions: Japan (1st title)
- Runner-up: Malaysia
- Third place: India

Tournament statistics
- Matches played: 37
- Goals scored: 302 (8.16 per match)
- Top scorer: (South Korea) Jang Jong-hyun (15 goals)

The men's field hockey tournament at the 2018 Asian Games was the 16th edition of the field hockey event for men at the Asian Games. It was held at the Gelora Bung Karno Hockey Field, Jakarta, Indonesia, from 20 August to 1 September 2018.

It was held alongside the women's tournament at the same venue from 19 to 31 August 2018.

== Competition schedule ==
P	Preliminary round	½	Semi-finals	B	Bronze medal match	F	Gold medal match

Mon 20	Tue 21	Wed 22	Thu 23	Fri 24	Sat 25	Sun 26	Mon 27	Tue 28	Wed 29	Thu 30	Fri 31	Sat 1	
P		P		P		P		P		½		B	F

== Qualification ==
Event	Dates	Location	Quotas	Qualifier(s)
Host	19 September 2014	(South Korea) Incheon	1	Indonesia
Qualified automatically via 2014 Asian Games	20 September – 2 October 2014	(South Korea) Incheon	5	India; Pakistan; South Korea; Malaysia; ~~China~~; Japan
Asian Games Qualifiers	8–17 March 2018	(Oman) Muscat	4	Oman; Bangladesh; Sri Lanka; Thailand; ~~Chinese Taipei~~
Reallocation	—N/a	—N/a	2	Kazakhstan; Hong Kong
Total			12	

== Pools composition ==
Teams were seeded following the serpentine system according to their FIH World Ranking as of July 2018.

Pool A	Pool B
India (5)	Malaysia (12)
South Korea (14)	Pakistan (13)
Japan (16)	Bangladesh (31)
Sri Lanka (38)	Oman (33)
Hong Kong (45)	Thailand (47)
Indonesia (–)	Kazakhstan (86)

== Preliminary round ==
All times are local Indonesia Western Standard Time (UTC+7).

=== Pool A ===
Pos	Team	Pld	W	D	L	PF	PA	PD	Pts	Qualification
1	India	5	5	0	0	76	3	+73	15	Semi-finals
2	Japan	5	4	0	1	30	11	+19	12	Semi-finals
3	South Korea	5	3	0	2	39	8	+31	9	Fifth place game
4	Sri Lanka	5	2	0	3	7	41	−34	6	Seventh place game
5	Indonesia (H)	5	1	0	4	5	40	−35	3	Ninth place game
6	Hong Kong	5	0	0	5	3	57	−54	0	Eleventh place game

Source: FIH
Rules for classification: 1) points; 2) goal difference; 3) goals scored; 4) head-to-head result.
(H) Hosts

20 August 2018
10:00

South Korea	11–0	Hong Kong
Jeong 4', 26', 34'; Jang 13', 21', 33', 54'; Seo 20'; Kim Se. 39'; Yang 57'; Kim J. 60'	Report

Umpires:
Saleh Al-Balushi (OMA)
Rawi Anbananthan (MAS)

20 August 2018
14:00

Japan	11–0	Sri Lanka
Zendana 2'; Ke. Tanaka 9', 19'; Yamashita 11'; Yamasaki 13', 28'; Mitani 14'; Murata 32', 34', 54'; Kirishita 52'	Report

Umpires:
Gareth Greenfield (NZL)
Salim Lucky (BAN)

20 August 2018
20:00

India	17–0	Indonesia
Rupinder 1', 3'; Dilpreet 7', 30', 32'; Akashdeep 10'; Simranjeet 13', 38', 53'; S. V. Sunil 25'; Prasad 27'; Mandeep 30', 45', 49'; Harmanpreet 31'; Lalit 45'; Amit 54'	Report

Umpires:
Narongtuch Subboonsung (THA)
Hafiz Atif Latif (PAK)

22 August 2018
12:00

South Korea	8–0	Sri Lanka
Kim Se. 5'; Kim J. 7'; Hwang W. 9'; Bae J. 14'; Jang 32', 42', 44'; Hwang T. 52'	Report

Umpires:
You Suolong (CHN)
Saleh Al-Balushi (OMA)

22 August 2018
14:00

India	26–0	Hong Kong
Akashdeep 2', 32', 39'; Manpreet 3', 17'; Rupinder 3', 5', 45+', 60'; S. V. Sunil 7'; Prasad 14'; Lalit 17', 19', 35', 55'; Mandeep 21'; Varun 23', 30+'; Amit 27'; Harmanpreet 29', 52', 53', 55'; Dilpreet 48'; Chinglensana 51'; Simranjeet 53'	Report

Umpires:
Rawi Anbananthan (MAS)
Narongtuch Subboonsong (THA)

22 August 2018
18:00

Indonesia	1–3	Japan
Rahmad 18'	Report	Zendana 14'; Murata 43'; Ke. Tanaka 49'

Umpires:
Salim Lucky (BAN)
Ilanggo Kanabathu (MAS)

24 August 2018
14:00

Indonesia	0–15	South Korea
	Report	Kim J-h 9', 35', 56'; Jang J 9', 30', 45'; Jung M 20', 46', 59'; Seo I 25', 58', 59'; Rim J 49'; Yang J 54'; Kim S-k 56'

Umpires:
Narongtuch Subboonsung (THA)
Hafiz Atif Latif (PAK)

24 August 2018
18:00

Sri Lanka	4–1	Hong Kong
Kulathunga 7'; Rathnayake 26'; Sudusinghe 51'; Gedara 55'	Report	Iu 54'

Umpires:
Salim Lucky (BAN)
Saleh Al-Balushi (OMA)

24 August 2018
20:00

Japan	0–8	India
	Report	S. V. Sunil 7'; Dilpreet 12'; Rupinder 17', 38'; Mandeep 32', 57'; Akashdeep 46'; Prasad 47'

Umpires:
Ilanggo Kanabathu (MAS)
Federico Garcia (URU)

26 August 2018
10:00

Sri Lanka	3–1	Indonesia
Sudusinghe 24'; Ranasinghe 42', 54'	Report	Hakim 38'

Umpires:
Ilanggo Kanabathu (MAS)
Salim Lucky (BAN)

26 August 2018
12:00

Hong Kong	0–13	Japan
	Report	S. Tanaka 10'; Ka. Tanaka 10', 29'; Ke. Tanaka 22', 38'; Zendana 24'; Ochiai 27'; Yamasaki 30', 41'; Fukuda 44', 51'; Murata 47'; Yamada 59'

Umpires:
You Suolong (CHN)
Hafiz Atif Latif (PAK)

26 August 2018
18:00

South Korea	3–5	India
Jung M-j 33', 35'; Jang J-h 60'	Report	Rupinder 1'; Chinglensana 5'; Lalit 16'; Manpreet 49'; Akashdeep 56'

Umpires:
Rawi Anbananthan (MAS)
Gareth Greenfield (NZL)

28 August 2018
10:00

Hong Kong	2–3	Indonesia
Siu 26'; Tsoi 60'	Report	Prastyo 13'; Aunalal 39'; Ardam 41'

Umpires:
Hafiz Atif Latif (PAK)
Salim Lucky (BAN)

28 August 2018
16:00

India	20–0	Sri Lanka
Rupinder 2', 52', 53'; Harmanpreet 6', 22', 33'; Akashdeep 10', 11', 18', 23', 33', 43'; Prasad 32'; Mandeep 36', 44', 59'; Amit 38'; Dipreet 53'; Lalit 58', 59'	Report

Umpires:
Ilanggo Kanabathu (MAS)
Saleh Al-Balushi (OMA)

28 August 2018
20:00

Japan	3–2	South Korea
Murata 28', 46', 49'	Report	Kim J 39'; Jang 48'

Umpires:
Rawi Anbananthan (MAS)
Gus Soteriades (USA)

=== Pool B ===
Pos	Team	Pld	W	D	L	PF	PA	PD	Pts	Qualification
1	Pakistan	5	5	0	0	45	1	+44	15	Semi-finals
2	Malaysia	5	4	0	1	41	6	+35	12	Semi-finals
3	Bangladesh	5	3	0	2	11	15	−4	9	Fifth place game
4	Oman	5	2	0	3	7	19	−12	6	Seventh place game
5	Thailand	5	1	0	4	4	27	−23	3	Ninth place game
6	Kazakhstan	5	0	0	5	5	45	−40	0	Eleventh place game

Source: FIH
Rules for classification: 1) points; 2) goal difference; 3) goals scored; 4) head-to-head result.

20 August 2018
12:00

Pakistan	10–0	Thailand
Arshad 15', 50'; Irfan 22'; Atiq 23', 39', 43'; Mahnood 31'; Ali 33'; Mahmood 42', 49'	Report

Umpires:
Gus Soteriades (USA)
Michihiko Watanabe (JPN)

20 August 2018
16:00

Bangladesh	2–1	Oman
Hossain 14'; Ashraful Islam 28'	Report	Al-Shaaibi 23'

Umpires:
Federico Garcia (URU)
Javed Shaikh (IND)

20 August 2018
18:00

Malaysia	16–2	Kazakhstan
Fa. Saari 2', 43', 53'; Jali 6'; Rahim 8', 34', 43', 48', 56'; Nik Rozemi 9', 13'; Saabah 20', 21'; Hasan 23'; Syafiq 30'; Tajuddin 38'	Report	Yelubayev 14'; Abdulabayev 55'

Umpires:
You Saolong (CHN)
Dayan Dissanayake (SRI)

22 August 2018
10:00

Kazakhstan	1–6	Bangladesh
Tashkeyev 52'	Report	Rabby 11'; Mahmud 14'; Mainul Islam 19'; Rahman 32', 48'; Chayan 60'

Umpires:
Raghu Prasad (IND)
Michihiko Watanabe (JPN)

22 August 2018
16:00

Malaysia	10–0	Thailand
M.A. Hassan 6'; Fa. Saari 19'; Ashaari 19'; Rahim 21'; A. Hassan 27'; Saabah 28', 40'; Aideed 37'; Tajuddin 44'; Fi. Saari 57'	Report

Umpires:
Kim Hong-lae (KOR)
Dayan Dissanayake (SRI)

22 August 2018
20:00

Pakistan	10–0	Oman
Bhutta 2'; Ahmad 15'; Irfan 34', 59'; Shan 37', 44', 55'; Dilber 40', 49'; Atiq 41'	Report

Umpires:
Javed Shaikh (IND)
Gareth Greenfield (NZL)

24 August 2018
10:00

Oman	2–0	Thailand
Al-Shaaibi 6'; Al-Qasmi 55'	Report

Umpires:
Kim Hong-lae (KOR)
You Suolong (CHN)

24 August 2018
12:00

Bangladesh	0–7	Malaysia
	Report	Rahim 18', 22'; Aideed 28'; Fa. Saari 31' van Huizen 38'; Fiqri 44'; Ashaari 60'

Umpires:
Raghu Prasad (IND)
Gus Soteriades (USA)

24 August 2018
16:00

Kazakhstan	0–16	Pakistan
	Report	Arshad 2', 34', 47', 60'; Dilber 7'; Shan 13', 38'; Bhutta 15', 58'; Mahmood 29', 30', 38'; R. Ali 51', 55'; Atiq 59'; M. Ali 60+'

Umpires:
Dayan Dissanayake (SRI)
Michihiko Watanabe (JPN)

26 August 2018
14:00

Oman	4–0	Kazakhstan
Al-Qasmi 14'; Al-Shibli 30'; Al-Shaaibi 49'; Al-Hasani 52'	Report

Umpires:
Raghu Prasad (IND)
Kim Hong-lae (KOR)

26 August 2018
16:00

Thailand	1–3	Bangladesh
Harapan 47'	Report	Islam 35', 41'; Hossain 55'

Umpires:
Javed Shaikh (IND)
Michihiko Watanabe (JPN)

26 August 2018
20:00

Pakistan	4–1	Malaysia
Irfan 6'; Ahmad 38', 48'; Ali 43'	Report	Jali 11'

Umpires:
Gus Soteriades (USA)
Federico Garcia (URU)

28 August 2018
12:00

Thailand	3–2	Kazakhstan
Harapan 4'; Boon-Art 18'; Samoechai 22'	Report	Yelubayev 29'; Zhokenbayev 52'

Umpires:
Dayan Dissanayake (SRI)
You Suolong (CHN)

28 August 2018
14:00

Malaysia	7-0	Oman
Rahim 28'; Tajuddin 32', 45'; Fa. Saari 34', 48'; Ashari 37'; Rozemi 42'	Report

Umpires:
Raghu Prasad (IND)
Michihiko Watanabe (JPN)

28 August 2018
18:00

Bangladesh	0-5	Pakistan
	Report	Atiq 2', 48'; Ali 9', 25'; Shan 36'

Umpires:
Javed Shaikh (IND)
Gareth Greenfield (NZL)

== Final round ==
=== Classification round ===
==== Eleventh place game ====
1 September 2018
12:30

Hong Kong	2–2	Kazakhstan
Iu 12'; Tso 55'	Report	Tashkeyev 21', 34'
Penalties
Cheun (penalty shoot-out missed); Iu (penalty shoot-out scored); Chan (penalty shoot-out scored); Monthong (penalty shoot-out missed); Ho (penalty shoot-out missed)	2–3	(penalty shoot-out scored) Yelubayev; (penalty shoot-out missed) Mukhamadiyev; (penalty shoot-out missed) Dyussebekov; (penalty shoot-out scored) Tashkeyev; (penalty shoot-out scored) Urmanov

Umpires:
Michihiko Watanabe (JPN)
Hafiz Atif Latif (PAK)

==== Ninth place game ====
30 August 2018
12:30

Indonesia	1–2	Thailand
Prastyo 18'	Report	Kampanthong 23'; Boon-Art 28'

Umpires:
Raghu Prasad (IND)
Salim Lucky (BAN)

==== Seventh place game ====
30 August 2018
15:00

Sri Lanka	2–5	Oman
Sudusinghe 14'; Rathnayake 55'	Report	M. Al-Hasani 5'; Al-Fazari 23', 40'; Al-Shibli 29'; Shamaiaa 44'

Umpires:
Gus Soteriades (USA)
Narongtuch Subboonsung (THA)

==== Fifth place game ====
1 September 2018
15:00

South Korea	7–0	Bangladesh
Kim J 10'; Seo 15'; Jeong J 26'; Jang 27', 44'; Jung 33'; Lee 57'	Report

Umpires:
Rawi Anbananthan (MAS)
You Suolong (CHN)

=== Medal round ===
Semi-finals
30 August
India	2 (6)
Malaysia (p.s.o.)	2 (7)
30 August
Pakistan	0
Japan	1

Gold medal match
1 September
Malaysia	6 (1)
Japan (p.s.o.)	6 (3)
Bronze medal match
1 September
India	2
Pakistan	1

==== Semi-finals ====
30 August 2018
17:30

India	2–2	Malaysia
Harmanpreet 33'; Varun 40'	Report	Faizal 39'; Razie 59'
Penalties
Manpreet (penalty shoot-out missed); Akashdeep (penalty shoot-out scored); Dilpreet (penalty shoot-out missed); S. V. Sunil (penalty shoot-out missed); Harmanpreet (penalty shoot-out scored); Harmanpreet (penalty shoot-out scored); Akashdeep (penalty shoot-out scored); Manpreet (penalty shoot-out scored); Dilpreet (penalty shoot-out scored); S. V. Sunil (penalty shoot-out missed)	6–7	(penalty shoot-out scored) Firhan; (penalty shoot-out missed) Tajuddin; (penalty shoot-out missed) Faizal; (penalty shoot-out missed) M. Hasan; (penalty shoot-out scored) Fitri; (penalty shoot-out scored) Firhan; (penalty shoot-out scored) Fitri; (penalty shoot-out scored) M. Hasan; (penalty shoot-out scored) Faizal; (penalty shoot-out scored) Tajuddin

Umpires:
Gareth Greenfield (NZL)
Kim Hong-lae (KOR)

30 August 2018
20:00

Pakistan	0–1	Japan
	Report	Yamada 18'

Umpires:
Javed Shaikh (IND)
Federico Garcia (URU)

==== Bronze medal match ====
1 September 2018
17:30

Pakistan	1–2	India
Atiq 52'	Report	Akashdeep 3'; Harmanpreet 50'

Umpires:
Ilanggo Kanabathu (MAS)
Gareth Greenfield (NZL)

==== Gold medal match ====
1 September 2018
20:00

Malaysia	6–6	Japan
Razie 4'; Tajuddin 11', 12', 59'; Faizal 17'; Amirol 50'	Report	S. Tanaka 9'; Ke. Tanaka 23', 53'; Ka. Tanaka 52'; Yamasaki 58'; Ochiai 60'
Penalties
Firhan (penalty shoot-out scored); Faizal (penalty shoot-out missed); M. Hasan (penalty shoot-out missed); Tajuddin (penalty shoot-out missed)	1–3	(penalty shoot-out scored) Yamasaki; (penalty shoot-out scored) Ke. Tanaka; (penalty shoot-out missed) S. Tanaka; (penalty shoot-out missed) Ochiai; (penalty shoot-out scored) Murata

Umpires:
Javed Shaikh (IND)
Kim Hong-lae (KOR)

== Statistics ==
=== Final standings ===
Rank	Team
Gold medal	Japan
Silver medal	Malaysia
Bronze medal	India
4	Pakistan
5	South Korea
6	Bangladesh
7	Oman
8	Sri Lanka
9	Thailand
10	Indonesia
11	Kazakhstan
12	Hong Kong

Qualified for the 2020 Summer Olympics as hosts

=== Goalscorers ===
There were 302 goals scored in 37 matches, for an average of 8.16 goals per match.

15 goals

- (South Korea) Jang Jong-hyun

13 goals

- (India) Akashdeep Singh
- (India) Rupinder Pal Singh

10 goals

- (India) Harmanpreet Singh
- (Malaysia) Razie Rahim

9 goals

- (India) Mandeep Singh

8 goals

- (Japan) Kazuma Murata
- (Malaysia) Faizal Saari
- (Pakistan) Muhammad Atiq

6 goals

- (India) Dilpreet Singh
- (India) Lalit Kumar Upadhyay
- (South Korea) Jung Man-jae
- (South Korea) Kim Jung-hoo
- (Pakistan) Ali Shan
- (Pakistan) Muhammad Toseeq Arshad

5 goals

- (Japan) Kenta Tanaka
- (South Korea) Seo In-woo
- (Pakistan) Abu Mahmood
- (Pakistan) Mubashar Ali

4 goals

- (India) Simranjeet Singh
- (India) Vivek Sagar Prasad
- (Japan) Koji Yamasaki
- (South Korea) Jeong Jun-woo
- (Malaysia) Shahril Saabah
- (Malaysia) Tengku Ahmad Tajuddin
- (Pakistan) Muhammad Irfan
- (Sri Lanka) Sandaruwan Sudusinghe

3 goals

- (Bangladesh) Ashraful Islam
- (India) Amit Rohidas
- (India) Manpreet Singh
- (India) S.V. Sunil
- (India) Varun Kumar
- (Japan) Hirotaka Zendana
- (Kazakhstan) Yermek Tashkeyev
- (Malaysia) Firhan Ashaari
- (Malaysia) Nik Aiman Nik Rozemi
- (Pakistan) Ajaz Ahmad
- (Pakistan) Muhammad Dilber
- (Pakistan) Muhammad Umar Bhutta
- (South Korea) Kim Seong-kyu

2 goals

- (Bangladesh) Md Khorshadur Rahman
- (Hong Kong) Felix Iu Chi Him
- (India) Chinglensana Singh
- (Indonesia) Alfandy Prastyo
- (Japan) Kaito Tanaka
- (Japan) Kentaro Fukuda
- (Japan) Shota Yamada
- (Kazakhstan) Aman Yelubayev
- (Malaysia) Amirul Aideed
- (Malaysia) Faiz Helmi Jali
- (Malaysia) Meor Azuan Hasan
- (Oman) Asaad Mubarak Al-Qasmi
- (Oman) Ammaar Juma Salim Al-Shaaibi
- (Oman) Muhanna Al-Hasani
- (Oman) Qasim Al-Shibli
- (Pakistan) Muhammad Rizwan Ali
- (South Korea) Yang Ji-hun
- (Sri Lanka) Anuradha Rathnayake
- (Sri Lanka) Ishanka Doranegala
- (Thailand) Borirak Harapan
- (Thailand) Thanakrit Boon-Art

1 goal

- (Bangladesh) Arshad Hossain
- (Bangladesh) Fazla Rabby
- (Bangladesh) Mainul Islam
- (Bangladesh) Mamunur Rahman Chayan
- (Bangladesh) Milon Hossain
- (Bangladesh) Rashel Mahmud
- (Hong Kong) Gabriel Tsoi
- (Hong Kong) Siu Chun Ming
- (Hong Kong) Tso Tsz Fung
- (India) Surender Kumar
- (Indonesia) Ardam
- (Indonesia) Astri Rahmad
- (Indonesia) Richard Aunalal
- (Indonesia) Wahid Hakim
- (Japan) Genki Mitani
- (Japan) Hiromasa Ochiai
- (Japan) Manabu Yamashita
- (Japan) Seren Tanaka
- (Japan) Yoshiki Kirishita
- (Kazakhstan) Ilgam Abdulabayev
- (Kazakhstan) Maxat Zhokenbayev
- (Malaysia) Azri Hassan
- (Malaysia) Fitri Saari
- (Malaysia) Joel van Huizen
- (Malaysia) Nabil Fiqri
- (Malaysia) Syed Syafiq Syed Cholan
- (Oman) Khalid Al-Shaaibi
- (Oman) Mahmood Bait Shamaiaa
- (Oman) Rashad Al-Fazari
- (Pakistan) Junaid Manzoor
- (South Korea) Bae Jong-suk
- (South Korea) Hwang Tae-il
- (South Korea) Hwang Weon-ki
- (South Korea) Lee Jung-jun
- (South Korea) Rim Jin-kang
- (Sri Lanka) Lahiru Panthie
- (Thailand) Seksit Samoechai
- (Thailand) Thanop Kampanthong

Source: FIH

== See also ==
- Field hockey at the 2018 Asian Games – Women's tournament
