= 2023 Men's Asian Champions Trophy =

Asian field hockey tournament

Hero Asian Champions Trophy Chennai 2023

Tournament details
- Host country: India
- City: Chennai
- Dates: 3–12 August
- Teams: 6 (from 1 confederation)
- Venue: Mayor Radhakrishnan Stadium

Final positions
- Champions: India (4th title)
- Runner-up: Malaysia
- Third place: Japan

Tournament statistics
- Matches played: 20
- Goals scored: 94 (4.7 per match)
- Top scorer: (India) Harmanpreet Singh (9 goals)
- Best player: (India) Mandeep Singh
- Best young player: (Pakistan) Hannan Shahid
- Best goalkeeper: (South Korea) Kim Jae-hyeon

The 2023 Men's Asian Champions Trophy (officially known as The Hero Asian Champions Trophy Chennai 2023 for sponsorship reasons) was the seventh edition of the Men's Asian Champions Trophy, a men's field hockey tournament for the six best Asian national teams organized by the Asian Hockey Federation. Chennai earlier hosted the 2007 Men's Hockey Asia Cup.

The hosts India won a record fourth title after defeating Malaysia 4–3 in the final. Japan won the bronze medal after beating the defending champions South Korea 5–3.

== Teams ==
Team	Appearance	Last appearance	Previous best performance
China	5th	2016	4th (2012, 2013)
India	7th	2021	1st (2011, 2016, 2018)
Japan	7th	2021	2nd (2013, 2021)
Malaysia	6th	2018	3rd (2011, 2012, 2013, 2016, 2018)
Pakistan	7th	2021	1st (2012, 2013, 2018)
South Korea	5th	2021	1st (2021)

== Round robin ==
=== Standings ===
Pos	Team	Pld	W	D	L	GF	GA	GD	Pts	Qualification
1	India (H)	5	4	1	0	20	5	+15	13	Semi-finals
2	Malaysia	5	4	0	1	12	8	+4	12	Semi-finals
3	South Korea	5	1	2	2	6	7	−1	5	Semi-finals
4	Japan	5	1	2	2	8	10	−2	5	Semi-finals
5	Pakistan	5	1	2	2	7	12	−5	5	Fifth place game
6	China	5	0	1	4	6	17	−11	1	Fifth place game

Source: FIH
Rules for classification: 1) points; 2) matches won; 3) goal difference; 4) goals for; 5) head-to-head result; 6) field goals for.
(H) Hosts

=== Results ===
3 August 2023
16:00

South Korea	2–1	Japan
Park 26'; Kim Ju. 35'	Report	Ooka 6'

Umpires:
Sean Rapaport (RSA)
Sourabh Rajput (IND)

3 August 2023
18:15

Malaysia	3–1	Pakistan
Firhan 28', 29'; Silverius 44'	Report	Rehman 55'

Umpires:
Tao Zhinan (CHN)
Tim Meissner (GER)

3 August 2023
20:30

India	7–2	China
Harmanpreet 5', 8'; Sukhjeet 15'; Akashdeep 16'; Varun 19', 30'; Mandeep 40'	Report	E 18'; Gao 25'

Umpires:
Hideki Kinoshita (JPN)
You Hyo-sik (KOR)

4 August 2023
16:00

South Korea	1–1	Pakistan
Yang 53'	Report	Shahid 18'

Umpires:
Hideki Kinoshita (JPN)
Zhinan Tao (CHN)

4 August 2023
18:15

China	1–5	Malaysia
Chen 4'	Report	Faizal 11'; Abu 15'; Firhan 45', 49'; Najmi 57'

Umpires:
Tim Meissner (GER)
Balaji Kumar (IND)

4 August 2023
20:30

India	1–1	Japan
Harmanpreet 43'	Report	Nagayoshi 28'

Umpires:
Sean Rapaport (RSA)
Yaser Khurshid (PAK)

6 August 2023
16:00

China	1–1	South Korea
Chen 43'	Report	Jang 18'

Umpires:
Yaser Khurshid (PAK)
Rajput Sourabh (IND)

6 August 2023
18:15

Pakistan	3–3	Japan
Rana 9'; Khan 25', 55'	Report	Yamashita 13'; Kato 37'; Ohashi 45+'

Umpires:
Balaji Kumar (IND)
You Hyo-sik (KOR)

6 August 2023
20:30

Malaysia	0–5	India
	Report	Karthi 15'; Hardik 32'; Harmanpreet 42'; Gurjant 53'; Jugraj 54'

Umpires:
Hideki Kinoshita (JPN)
Zhinan Tao (CHN)

7 August 2023
16:00

Japan	1–3	Malaysia
Niwa 59'	Report	Najmi 13'; Azuan 37'; Silverius 59'

Umpires:
Yaser Khurshid (PAK)
You Hyo-sik (KOR)

7 August 2023
18:15

Pakistan	2–1	China
Khan 20'; Afraz 39'	Report	Gao 33'

Umpires:
Sean Rapaport (RSA)
Balaji Kumar (IND)

7 August 2023
20:30

South Korea	2–3	India
Kim S. 12'; Yang 58'	Report	Nilakanta 6'; Harmanpreet 23'; Mandeep 33'

Umpires:
Tim Meissner (GER)
Tao Zhinan (CHN)

9 August 2023
16:00

Japan	2–1	China
Yamada 8'; Fukuda 54'	Report	Ao Suozhu 57'

Umpires:
Rajput Sourabh (IND)
Yaser Khurshid (PAK)

9 August 2023
18:15

Malaysia	1–0	South Korea
Abu 22'	Report

Umpires:
Hideki Kinoshita (JPN)
Sean Rapaport (RSA)

9 August 2023
20:30

India	4–0	Pakistan
Harmanpreet 15', 23'; Jugraj 36'; Akashdeep 55'	Report

Umpires:
You Hyo-sik (KOR)
Tim Meissner (GER)

== Fifth place game ==
11 August 2023
15:30

Pakistan	6–1	China
Ammad 10', 52'; Khan 11', 12'; Shahid 15'; Rana 55'	Report	Chen Benhai 35'

Umpires:
Balaji Kumar (IND)
Rajput Sourabh (IND)

== First to fourth place classification ==
=== Bracket ===
Semi-finals
11 August
Malaysia	6
South Korea	2
11 August
India	5
Japan	0

Final
12 August
Malaysia	3
India	4
Third place
12 August
South Korea	3
Japan	5

=== Semi-finals ===
11 August 2023
18:00

Malaysia	6–2	South Korea
Abu 3'; Najmi 9', 21'; Faizal 19'; Silverius 47', 48'	Report	Ji 2'; Jang 14'

Umpires:
Hideki Kinoshita (JPN)
Tim Meissner (GER)

11 August 2023
20:30

India	5–0	Japan
Akashdeep 19'; Harmanpreet 23'; Mandeep 30'; Sumit 39'; Karthi 51'	Report

Umpires:
You Hyo-sik (KOR)
Sean Rapaport (RSA)

=== Third and fourth place ===
12 August 2023
18:00

South Korea	3–5	Japan
Jang 15', 33'; Park 26'	Report	Ooka 3'; Kato 9'; Fukuda 28'; Yamada 53'; Nagayoshi 56'

Umpires:
Sourabh Rajput (IND)
Tim Meissner (GER)

=== Final ===
12 August 2023
20:30

Malaysia	3–4	India
Abu 14'; Razie 18'; Aminudin 28'	Report	Jugraj 9'; Harmanpreet 45'; Gurjant 45'; Akashdeep 56'

Umpires:
You Hyo-sik (KOR)
Sean Rapaport (RSA)

== Results ==
Pos	Team
1	India (H, C)
2	Malaysia
3	Japan
4	South Korea
5	Pakistan
6	China

Source: FIH
(C) Champion; (H) Host

== Statistics ==
=== Awards ===
Player of the Tournament	Goalkeeper of the Tournament	Leading Goalscorer	Emerging Player of the Tournament
(India) Mandeep Singh	(South Korea) Kim Jae-hyeon	(India) Harmanpreet Singh	(Pakistan) Abdul Shahid

=== Goalscorers ===
There were 94 goals scored in 20 matches, for an average of 4.7 goals per match.

9 goals

- (India) Harmanpreet Singh

5 goals

- (Pakistan) Muhammad Khan

4 goals

- (India) Akashdeep Singh
- (Malaysia) Firhan Ashar
- (Malaysia) Abu Kamal Azrai
- (Malaysia) Najmi Jazlan
- (Malaysia) Shello Silverius
- (South Korea) Jang Jong-Hyun

3 goals

- (India) Jugraj Singh
- (India) Mandeep Singh

2 goals

- (China) Chongong Chen
- (China) Gao Jiesheng
- (India) Gurjant Singh
- (India) Varun Kumar
- (India) Selvam Karthi
- (Japan) Ryosei Kato
- (Japan) Kentaro Fukuda
- (Japan) Ken Nagayoshi
- (Japan) Ryoma Ooka
- (Japan) Shota Yamada
- (Malaysia) Faizal Saari
- (Pakistan) Abdul Rana
- (Pakistan) Hannan Shahid
- (Pakistan) Muhammad Ammad
- (South Korea) Park Cheo-Leon
- (South Korea) Yang Ji-Hun

1 goal

- (China) Ao Suozhu
- (China) Chen Benhai
- (China) E Wenhui
- (India) Nilakanta Sharma
- (India) Hardik Singh
- (India) Sukhjeet Singh
- (India) Sumit Walmiki
- (Japan) Takuma Niwa
- (Japan) Masaki Ohashi
- (Japan) Seren Tanaka
- (Malaysia) Azuan Hasan
- (Malaysia) Aminudin Zain
- (Malaysia) Razie Rahim
- (South Korea) Ji Woo-Cheon
- (South Korea) Kim Jung-Hoo
- (South Korea) Kim Sung-Hyun
- (Pakistan) Abdul Rehman
- (Pakistan) Afraz Hakeem

Source: FIH

== See also ==
- 2023 Women's Asian Champions Trophy
- Field hockey at the 2022 Asian Games – Men's tournament
