= Men's Asian Champions Trophy =

Field hockey championship

- Most recent season or competition: 2026 Men's Asian Champions Trophy
- Sport: Field hockey
- Founded: 2011; 15 years ago
- First season: 2011
- No. of teams: 6
- Confederation: Asian Hockey Federation
- Most recent champion: India (6th title) (2026)
- Most titles: India (6 titles)

The Men's Asian Champions Trophy is an event held annually by the Asian Hockey Federation since 2011. It features Asia's six top field hockey teams in the hockey season competing in a round robin format. India is the most successful team in the tournament history, winning the trophy six times. The next most frequent champion has been Pakistan, winning the trophy thrice.

India won the 2026 edition against Japan 4–1 in the final. At the 2018 edition, the final between India and Pakistan was abandoned due to heavy rainfall and the two nations were declared joint winners.

== Results ==
#	Year	Host	Final			Third place match			Teams
#	Year	Host	Winner	Score	Runner-up	Third place	Score	Fourth place	Teams
1	2011; Details	Ordos, China	India	0–0 (4–2 S.O.)	Pakistan	Malaysia	1–0	Japan	6
2	2012; Details	Doha, Qatar	Pakistan	5–4	India	Malaysia	3–1	China	6
3	2013; Details	Kakamigahara, Japan	Pakistan	3–1	Japan	Malaysia	3–0	China	6
4	2016; Details	Kuantan, Malaysia	India	3–2	Pakistan	Malaysia	1–1 (3–1 S.O.)	South Korea	6
5	2018; Details	Muscat, Oman	India and Pakistan (Joint winners)			Malaysia	2–2 (3–2 S.O.)	Japan	6
6	2021; Details	Dhaka, Bangladesh	South Korea	3–3 (4–2 S.O.)	Japan	India	4–3	Pakistan	5
7	2023; Details	Chennai, India	India	4–3	Malaysia	Japan	5–3	South Korea	6
8	2024; Details	Hulunbuir, China	India	1–0	China	Pakistan	5–2	South Korea	6
9	2026; Details	Punjab, India	India	4–1	Japan	Malaysia	5–2	South Korea	6

== Summary ==
Team	Winners	Runners-up	Third place	Fourth place
India	6 (2011, 2016, 2018^, 2023*, 2024, 2026*)	1 (2012)	1 (2021)	
Pakistan	3 (2012, 2013, 2018^)	2 (2011, 2016)	1 (2024)	1 (2021)
South Korea	1 (2021)			4 (2016, 2023, 2024, 2026)
Japan		3 (2013*, 2021, 2026)	1 (2023)	2 (2011, 2018)
Malaysia		1 (2023)	6 (2011, 2012, 2013, 2016*, 2018, 2026)	
China		1 (2024*)		2 (2012, 2013)

* = host nation
^ = title shared

== Team appearances ==
Team	(China) 2011	(Qatar) 2012	(Japan) 2013	(Malaysia) 2016	(Oman) 2018	(Bangladesh) 2021	(India) 2023	(China) 2024	(India) 2026	Total
Bangladesh	–	–	–	–	–	5th	–	–	6th	2
China	6th	4th	4th	5th	–	–	6th	2nd	5th	7
India	1st	2nd	5th	1st	1st	3rd	1st	1st	1st	9
Japan	4th	6th	2nd	6th	4th	2nd	3rd	5th	2nd	9
Malaysia	3rd	3rd	3rd	3rd	3rd	WD	2nd	6th	3rd	8
Oman	–	5th	6th	–	6th	–	–	–	–	3
Pakistan	2nd	1st	1st	2nd	1st	4th	5th	3rd	WD	8
South Korea	5th	–	–	4th	5th	1st	4th	4th	4th	7
Total (8)	6	6	6	6	6	5	6	6	6	

== See also ==
- Men's Hockey Asia Cup
- Women's Asian Champions Trophy
