= Pakistan national field hockey team tours and matches (2025–2029) =

- Season: 2025–2029

This page lists all the tours, and matches played by Pakistan national field hockey team from 2025 to 2029. During this period Pakistan's most successful tournament was the Men's FIH Hockey Nations Cup (Runners-up: 2025).

== List of tours ==
Year	Host(s)	Competition	GP	W	D	L	GF	GA	Result	Position	Head Coach
2025	Malaysia	2024–25 Men's FIH Hockey Nations Cup	5	1	2	2	14	18	Final	2nd	(Pakistan) Tahir Zaman
2025	Bangladesh	2025 Men's FIH Hockey World Cup Qualifiers – Asia Play-offs	3	3	0	0	26	5	Qualified to 2026 Men's FIH Hockey World Cup Qualifiers	1st	(Pakistan) Muhammad Usman
2025	N/A	2025–26 Men's FIH Pro League	4	0	0	4	8	20	Relegated to 2026–27 FIH Nations Cup	9th	(Pakistan) Manzoor ul Hassan
2026	N/A	2025–26 Men's FIH Pro League	12	0	0	12	14	59	Relegated to 2026–27 FIH Nations Cup	9th	(Pakistan) Manzoor ul Hassan
2026	Egypt	2026 Men's FIH Hockey World Cup Qualifiers	5	4	0	1	19	16	Final	2nd	(Pakistan) Khawaja Junaid
2026	Pakistan	South Korea Test Series	3	3	0	0	10	5	Champions	1st	(Netherlands) Bob Veldhof
2026	Belgium & Netherlands	2026 Men's FIH Hockey World Cup	6	1	2	3	17	23	Group stage	11th	(Netherlands) Bob Veldhof
2026	Japan	2026 Asian Games	7	5	0	2	36	15	Semi finals	3rd	(Netherlands) Herman Kruis

== Matches ==
=== 2025 ===
==== Men's FIH Hockey Nations Cup ====
15 June 2025
Pool stage

Malaysia	3 – 3	Pakistan
Fitri 49'; Cholan 52', 56'	Report	Nadeem 6'; Rehman 9'; Rana 54'

Kuala Lumpur, Malaysia

Stadium: Malaysia National Hockey Stadium

16 June 2025
Pool stage

Japan	2 – 3	Pakistan
Matsumoto 9'; Yamasaki 11'	Report	Ali 8'; Rana 34'; Khan 52'

Kuala Lumpur, Malaysia

Stadium: Malaysia National Hockey Stadium

18 June 2025
Pool stage

New Zealand	4 – 3	Pakistan
Woods 7'; Cosslett 43', 45', 52'	Report	Rehman 13', 14'; Rana 28'

Kuala Lumpur, Malaysia

Stadium: Malaysia National Hockey Stadium

20 June 2025
Semifinal

France	3 – 3	Pakistan
Esmenjaud 25'; Charlet 34', 58'	Report	Afraz 38'; Khan 42'; Hammadudin 43'
Penalties
Montécot (penalty shoot-out scored); Lockwood (penalty shoot-out missed); Tynevez (penalty shoot-out missed); Sellier (penalty shoot-out scored); Esmenjaud (penalty shoot-out missed)	2–3	(penalty shoot-out scored) Afraz; (penalty shoot-out missed) Rehman; (penalty shoot-out scored) Shahid; (penalty shoot-out scored) Rana

Kuala Lumpur, Malaysia

Stadium: Malaysia National Hockey Stadium

21 June 2025
Final

Pakistan	2 – 6	New Zealand
Hayat 36'; Khan 59'	Report	Cosslett 6', 58'; Hiha 15'; Thomas 17'; Findlay 18'; Boyde 27'

Kuala Lumpur, Malaysia

Stadium: Malaysia National Hockey Stadium

==== Asia Play-offs Road to FIH World Cup Qualifiers ====
13 November 2025

Bangladesh	2 – 8	Pakistan
Hossain 15'; Islam 58'	Report	Butt 4'; Nadeem 19', 56'; Afraz 24', 30'; Ali 32'; Rana 44'; Shahid 47'

Dhaka, Bangladesh

Stadium: Maulana Bhasani Hockey Stadium

14 November 2025

Bangladesh	0 – 8	Pakistan
	Report	Sufyan 6', 19'; Rana 13', 57'; Rana 30+'; Shahid 32'; Afraz 53'; Butt 19'

Dhaka, Bangladesh

Stadium: Maulana Bhasani Hockey Stadium

16 November 2025

Bangladesh	3 – 10	Pakistan
Abdullah 19'; Hasan 44'; Islam 57'	Report	Sufyan 8', 10', 16', 29', 34', 57'; Rehman 15', 59'; Nadeem 40'; Rana 52'

Dhaka, Bangladesh

Stadium: Maulana Bhasani Hockey Stadium

==== 2025–26 FIH Pro League ====
10 December 2025

Netherlands	5 – 2	Pakistan
Bijen 12'; Boers 15', 44'; Reyenga 36'; Telgenkamp 41'	Report	Shahid 9'; Khan 18'

Santiago del Estero, Argentina

Stadium: Santiago del Estero Hockey Club

12 December 2025

Argentina	3 – 2	Pakistan
Domene 19'; Torre 41'; Casella 42'	Report	Ammad 36'; Rana 45+'

Santiago del Estero, Argentina

Stadium: Santiago del Estero Hockey Club

13 December 2025

Pakistan	3 – 7	Netherlands
Khan 39', 60'; Rana 55'	Report	Dam 17'; Brinkman 22', 45'; Jansen 23', 51'; Boers 52'; Croon 59'

Santiago del Estero, Argentina

Stadium: Santiago del Estero Hockey Club

15 December 2025

Argentina	5 – 1	Pakistan
Torre 7'; Capurro 15', 21'; Martins 37'; Domene 39'	Report	Rana 34'

Santiago del Estero, Argentina

Stadium: Santiago del Estero Hockey Club

=== 2026 ===
==== 2025–26 FIH Pro League ====
10 February 2026

Australia	3 – 2	Pakistan
Brand 2', 19'; Govers 58'	Report	Nadeem 49'; Khan 53'

Hobart, Australia

Stadium: Tasmanian Hockey Centre

11 February 2026

Pakistan	2 – 5	Germany
Ammad 18'; Khan 57'	Report	Rühr 6'; Grambusch 17'; Schwarzhaupt 25'; Hellwig 41'; Hartkopf 42'

Hobart, Australia

Stadium: Tasmanian Hockey Centre

13 February 2026

Australia	3 – 0	Pakistan
Govers 14', 34'; Welch 42'	Report

Hobart, Australia

Stadium: Tasmanian Hockey Centre

14 February 2026

Germany	6 – 1	Pakistan
Sperling 26'; Warweg 28', 36'; Ludwig 30'; Mertgens 32'; Hartkopf 54'	Report	Rana 18'

Hobart, Australia

Stadium: Tasmanian Hockey Centre

13 June 2026

Belgium	7 – 1	Pakistan
Onana 3'; Stockbroekx 38'; Hendrickx 42'; Biekens 50', 55'; Hellin 51'; Boon 55'	Report	Rana 33'

Wavre, Belgium

Stadium: Stade Justin Peeters

14 June 2026

Pakistan	1 – 5	Spain
Mahmood 43'	Report	Álvarez 11', 52'; Cunill 23', 30'; Reyne 48'

Wavre, Belgium

Stadium: Stade Justin Peeters

18 June 2026

Belgium	6 – 0	Pakistan
de Kerpel 1'; Boon 17', 23', 46'; Foubert 41'; Labouchere 50'	Report

Wavre, Belgium

Stadium: Stade Justin Peeters

20 June 2026

Spain	4 – 2	Pakistan
Cunill 29'; Alonso 35'; Álvarez 43', 51'	Report	Mahmood 28', 44'

Wavre, Belgium

Stadium: Stade Justin Peeters

23 June 2026

Pakistan	3 – 4	India
Nadeem 8'; Mahmood 53'; Shakeel 60+'	Report	Manpreet 22'; Nilakanta 24'; Sukhjeet 40'; Rajinder 52'

London, England

Stadium: Lee Valley Hockey and Tennis Centre

24 June 2026

England	2 – 1	Pakistan
Roper 40'; Hooper 46'	Report	Rana 27'

London, England

Stadium: Lee Valley Hockey and Tennis Centre

26 June 2026

India	7 – 1	Pakistan
Sukhjeet 20'; Harmanpreet 26'; Hardik 34'; Jugraj 35'; Abhishek 41'; Pal 44'; Dilpreet 54'	Report	Mahmood 13'

London, England

Stadium: Lee Valley Hockey and Tennis Centre

27 June 2026

England	7 – 0	Pakistan
Ward 9'; Bandurak 15', 48'; Taylor 22'; Hooper 38'; Wallace 49'; Croft 52'	Report

London, England

Stadium: Lee Valley Hockey and Tennis Centre

==== 2026 FIH World Cup Qualifiers ====
01 March 2026

Pakistan	5 – 4	China
Khan 8'; Wah. Rana 20'; Ammad 21'; Mahmood 35'; Wal. Rana 43'	Report	Du 16', 39'; Guan 42'; Zhang 49'

Ismailia, Egypt

Stadium: Suez Canal Stadium

02 March 2026

Pakistan	5 – 3	Malaysia
Rana 13'; Hayat 16'; Nadeem 45+'; Khan 49'; Ammad 56'	Report	Abdu Rauf 12'; Anuar 14'; Saari 40'

Ismailia, Egypt

Stadium: Suez Canal Stadium

04 March 2026

Austria	2 – 4	Pakistan
Kelner 47'; Scholz 53'	Report	Afraz 4'; Mahmood 44', 52'; Khan 51'

Ismailia, Egypt

Stadium: Suez Canal Stadium

06 March 2026

Pakistan	4 – 3	Japan
Ammad 9'; Mahmood 52'; Khan 55'; Afraz 57'	Report	Ooka 21'; Yamada 35'; Yamasaki 41'

Ismailia, Egypt

Stadium: Suez Canal Stadium

07 March 2026

England	4 – 1	Pakistan
Croft 18'; Hooper 35', 40'; Fox 52'	Report	Wal. Rana 42'

Ismailia, Egypt

Stadium: Suez Canal Stadium

==== South Korea Test Series ====
30 July 2026

Pakistan	3 – 1	South Korea
Khan 21', 37'; Mahmood 30'	Report	Yang 26'

Islamabad, Pakistan

Stadium: Naseer Bunda Hockey Stadium

1 August 2026

Pakistan	3 – 1	South Korea
Butt 33'; Mahmood 52', 60'	Report	Son 30'

Islamabad, Pakistan

Stadium: Naseer Bunda Hockey Stadium

4 August 2026

Pakistan	4 – 3	South Korea
Hayat 32'; Rana 45'; Abdul 55'; Shahid 57'		Hyeong-jin 10'; Yang 33'; Bok 50'

Islamabad, Pakistan

Stadium: Naseer Bunda Hockey Stadium

==== 2026 FIH Hockey World Cup ====
15 August 2026

England	4 – 1	Pakistan
Rushmere 12'; Ward 28'; Hooper 31'; Albery 47'	Report	Afraz 50'

Amstelveen, Netherlands

Stadium: Wagener Stadium

17 August 2026

Pakistan	3 – 3	Wales
Abdul 3'; Khan 49'; Shahid 51'	Report	Furlong 25', 53'; Bradshaw 26'

Amstelveen, Netherlands

Stadium: Wagener Stadium

19 August 2026

Pakistan	3 – 5	India
Shahid 22', 46'; Khan 24'	Report	Harmanpreet 5', 21'; Abhishek 11', 24'; Hardik 35'

Amstelveen, Netherlands

Stadium: Wagener Stadium

22 August 2026

Pakistan	4 – 3	Japan
Rana 22', 32'; Hammadudin 33'; Shahid 41'	Report	Yamada 7'; Tanaka 15'; Yamasaki 36'

Amstelveen, Netherlands

Stadium: Wagener Stadium

24 August 2026

New Zealand	4 – 2	Pakistan
Thomas 1'; Boyde 16'; Baker 22'; Russell 49'	Report	Khan 33'; Afraz 38'

Amstelveen, Netherlands

Stadium: Wagener Stadium

28 August 2026

Pakistan	4 – 4	South Africa
Afraz 21'; Ammad 22'; Rana 32'; Hammadudin 60'	Report	de Lora 8'; D. Cassiem 18'; M. Cassiem 40', 55'
Penalties
Hayat (penalty shoot-out scored); Mustafa (penalty shoot-out scored); Shahid (penalty shoot-out scored); Rana (penalty shoot-out missed); Butt (penalty shoot-out scored)	4–3	(penalty shoot-out scored) D. Cassiem; (penalty shoot-out scored) Davis; (penalty shoot-out missed) Neethling; (penalty shoot-out missed) Seale; (penalty shoot-out scored) M. Cassiem

Amstelveen, Netherlands

Stadium: Wagener Stadium

==== 2026 Asian Games ====
20 September 2026

Pakistan	9 – 0	Thailand
Shakeel 8'; Butt 12'; Nadeem 20', 37', 43'; Khan 22', 23'; Rana 31'; Shahid 34'	Report

Kakamigahara, Japan

Stadium: Kawasaki Juko Stadium

22 September 2026

Pakistan	5 – 1	Uzbekistan
Ammad 18'; Khan 33', 57'; Rehman 40'; Mahmood 45'	Report	Salimjonov 30+'

Kakamigahara, Japan

Stadium: Kawasaki Juko Stadium

24 September 2026

China	0 – 3	Pakistan
	Report	Mahmood 19'; Khan 24'; Shahid 28'

Kakamigahara, Japan

Stadium: Kawasaki Juko Stadium

26 September 2026

Malaysia	5 – 4	Pakistan
Silverius 5', 56'; Fa. Saari 23'; Fi. Saari 45'; Azrai 57'	Report	Khan 3', 39', 43', 46'

Kakamigahara, Japan

Stadium: Kawasaki Juko Stadium

28 September 2026

Pakistan	7 – 2	Oman
Khan 22', 28'; Rana 34', 44', 59'; Ali 40'; Ammad 46'	Report	Al-Nofli 28'; Madit 36'

Kakamigahara, Japan

Stadium: Kawasaki Juko Stadium

1 October 2026

India	4 – 3	Pakistan
Harmanpreet 5', 13'; Sukhjeet 23'; Abhishek 60'	Report	Mahmood 30'; Shahid 45'; Rana 49'

Kakamigahara, Japan

Stadium: Kawasaki Juko Stadium

3 October 2026

Pakistan	5 – 3	South Korea
Khan 4'; Abdul 30'; Rana 52', 54'; Shahid 59'	Report	Lee G. 12'; Kim Y. 18'; Yang 25'

Kakamigahara, Japan

Stadium: Kawasaki Juko Stadium
