= Pakistan national field hockey team tours and matches (2020–2024) =

- Season: 2020–2024

This page lists all the tours, and matches played by Pakistan national field hockey team from 2020 to 2024. During this period Pakistan's most successful tournament was the Sultan Azlan Shah Cup (Runners-up: 2024). Worst results were failing to qualify for the 2024 Summer Olympics and the 2023 Men's FIH Hockey World Cup. Pakistan lost 10–2 to India in 2023 the biggest defeat in history for the team till now.

== List of tours ==
Year	Host(s)	Competition	GP	W	D	L	GF	GA	Result	Position	Head Coach
2021	Bangladesh	2021 Men's Asian Champions Trophy	6	1	2	3	19	17	Semifinals	4th	(Pakistan) Khawaja Junaid
2022	Indonesia	2022 Men's Hockey Asia Cup	5	3	1	1	29	6	Group Stage	5th	(Netherlands) Siegfried Aikman
2022	England	2022 Commonwealth Games	5	2	1	2	10	18	Group Stage	7th	(Netherlands) Siegfried Aikman
2022	Malaysia	2022 Sultan Azlan Shah Cup	6	2	2	2	14	13	Pool stage	3rd	(Netherlands) Siegfried Aikman
2022	South Africa	2022 Men's FIH Hockey Nations Cup	5	1	1	3	12	19	Group Stage	7th	(Netherlands) Siegfried Aikman
2023	India	2023 Men's Asian Champions Trophy	6	2	2	2	13	13	Group Stage	5th	(Pakistan) Shahnaz Sheikh
2023	China	2022 Asian Games	6	4	0	2	43	19	Preliminary round	5th	(Pakistan) Shahnaz Sheikh
2024	Oman	2024 FIH Olympic Qualifiers	5	1	1	3	8	16	Semifinals	4th	(Pakistan) Shahnaz Sheikh
2024	Malaysia	2024 Sultan Azlan Shah Cup	5	3	3	0	18	12	Final	2nd	(Netherlands) Roelant Oltmans
2024	Poland	2023–24 Men's FIH Hockey Nations Cup	5	1	1	3	21	17	Semifinals	4th	(Netherlands) Roelant Oltmans
2024	China	2024 Men's Asian Champions Trophy	7	3	3	1	18	11	Semifinals	3rd	(Netherlands) Roelant Oltmans

== Matches ==
=== 2021 ===
==== 2021 Men's Asian Champions Trophy ====
14 December 2021
Group stage

Japan	0 – 0	Pakistan
	Report

Dhaka, Bangladesh

Stadium: Maulana Bhasani Hockey Stadium

17 December 2021
Group stage

India	3 – 1	Pakistan
Harmanpreet 9', 53'; Akashdeep 42'	Report	Manzoor 45'

Dhaka, Bangladesh

Stadium: Maulana Bhasani Hockey Stadium

18 December 2021
Group stage

Pakistan	3 – 3	South Korea
Afraz 24'; Rana 33', 57'	Report	Kim K. 14'; Ji 42'; Jang 56'

Dhaka, Bangladesh

Stadium: Maulana Bhasani Hockey Stadium

19 December 2021
Group stage

Pakistan	6 – 2	Bangladesh
Nadeem 14', 26'; Ahmad 18', 38'; Afraz 24'; Razzaq 34'	Report	Arshad 13', 35'

Dhaka, Bangladesh

Stadium: Maulana Bhasani Hockey Stadium

21 December 2021
Semifinal

South Korea	6 – 5	Pakistan
Jang 11', 12', 25', 56'; Yang 30+'; Jeong 44'	Report	Umar Bhutta 3'; Manzoor 22'; Afraz 30'; M. Ali 47', 51'

Dhaka, Bangladesh

Stadium: Maulana Bhasani Hockey Stadium

22 December 2021
Final

Pakistan	3 – 4	India
Afraz 10'; Rana 33'; Shakeel 57'	Report	Harmanpreet 2'; Sumit 45'; Varun 54'; Akashdeep 57'

Dhaka, Bangladesh

Stadium: Maulana Bhasani Hockey Stadium

=== 2022 ===
==== 2022 Men's Hockey Asia Cup ====
23 May 2022
Group stage

India	1 – 1	Pakistan
Karthi 9'	Report	Rana 59'

Jakarta, Indonesia

Stadium: Gelora Sports Complex

24 May 2022
Group stage

Pakistan	13 – 0	Indonesia
Ahmad 2', 49'; Rana 4', 17'; Manan 6', 19'; R. Ali 15', 25', 43'; M. Ali 16'; Shan 19'; G. Ali 35'; Shakeel 45'	Report

Jakarta, Indonesia

Stadium: Gelora Sports Complex

26 May 2022
Group stage

Pakistan	2 – 3	Japan
Ahmad 23'; M. Ali 30'	Report	Ooka 14'; Saeki 15'; Niwa 27'

Jakarta, Indonesia

Stadium: Gelora Sports Complex

28 May 2022
5th to 8th place crossover

Pakistan	5 – 2	Oman
Rana 19'; G. Ali 21'; R. Ali 29', 30'; Shakeel 32'	Report	Al-Fazari 11'; Al-Maaini 44'

Jakarta, Indonesia

Stadium: Gelora Sports Complex

1 June 2022
Fifth place match

Pakistan	8 – 0	Bangladesh
R. Ali 11'; M. Ali 16', 32'; Afraz 39'; Shahid 42'; Bhutta 48'; Ahmad 53'; G. Ali 60'	Report

Jakarta, Indonesia

Stadium: Gelora Sports Complex

==== 2022 Commonwealth Games ====
30 July 2022
Group stage

South Africa	2 – 2	Pakistan
Beauchamp 14'; Guise-Brown 54'	Report	R. Ali 25'; Hakeem 60'

Birmingham, England

Stadium: University of Birmingham Hockey and Squash centre

31 July 2022
Group stage

New Zealand	4 – 1	Pakistan
Inglis 17', 18'; Thomas 43'; Lane 60'	Report	G. Ali 26'

Birmingham, England

Stadium: University of Birmingham Hockey and Squash centre

3 August 2022
Group stage

Pakistan	3 – 2	Scotland
Hakeem 22'; Shahid 23'; Khan 55'	Report	C. Golden 9'; Walker 38'

Birmingham, England

Stadium: University of Birmingham Hockey and Squash centre

4 August 2022
Group stage

Australia	7 – 0	Pakistan
Govers 12'; Hayward 19', 40'; Wickham 42', 48'; Anderson 53'; Ephramus 59'	Report

Birmingham, England

Stadium: University of Birmingham Hockey and Squash centre

6 August 2022
Seventh place match

Pakistan	4 – 3	Canada
Rana 24'; Ali 25'; Umar Bhutta 52'; Shahid 60'	Report	Sarmento 26', 58'; Pereira 30'

Birmingham, England

Stadium: University of Birmingham Hockey and Squash centre

==== 2022 Sultan Azlan Shah Cup ====
1 November 2022
Group stage

Pakistan	1 – 4	South Africa
Shahid 47'	Report	De Lora 25'; Beauchamp 27'; Ngubane 38'; Le Forestier 43'

Ipoh, Malaysia

Stadium: Azlan Shah Stadium

2 November 2022
Group stage

Pakistan	1 – 1	Malaysia
Ahmad 36'	Report	Silverius 26'

Ipoh, Malaysia

Stadium: Azlan Shah Stadium

4 November 2022
Group stage

Japan	2 – 2	Pakistan
Fukuda 43'; Kawabe 55'	Report	Sufyan 17', 19'

Ipoh, Malaysia

Stadium: Azlan Shah Stadium

5 November 2022
Group stage

South Korea	2 – 1	Pakistan
Kim Hyeon-hong 51', 52'	Report	Shahid 4'

Ipoh, Malaysia

Stadium: Azlan Shah Stadium

7 November 2022
Group stage

Egypt	1 – 4	Pakistan
M. Ragab 50'	Report	Rana 12'; Sufyan 26', 44'; Liaqat 39'

Ipoh, Malaysia

Stadium: Azlan Shah Stadium

9 November 2022
Third place match

Japan	3 – 5	Pakistan
Fukuda 10'; Nagai 31', 50'	Report	Shahid 11'; Ahmad 18'; Khan 27', 35'; Rana 53'

Ipoh, Malaysia

Stadium: Azlan Shah Stadium

==== 2022 Men's FIH Hockey Nations Cup ====
28 November 2022
Group stage

South Africa	6 – 2	Pakistan
Dlungwana 9'; M. Cassiem 26'; Mvimbi 28'; Kok 41'; D. Cassiem 46'; Horne 57'	Report	Khan 14'; Liaqat 51'

Potchefstroom, South Africa

Stadium: NWU Astro

29 November 2022
Group stage

Ireland	3 – 1	Pakistan
Empey 18'; Walker 32'; O'Donoghue 50'	Report	Shahid 17'

Potchefstroom, South Africa

Stadium: NWU Astro

1 December 2022
Group stage

France	3 – 3	Pakistan
Van Straaten 12'; Jouin 36'; Charlet 58'	Report	Rana 9'; Hakeem 28'; Ahmad 60'

Potchefstroom, South Africa

Stadium: NWU Astro

3 December 2022
5–8th place semifinals

Japan	3 – 1	Pakistan
Nagayoshi 27'; Kawabe 47'; Fukuda 54'	Report	Rooman 48'

Potchefstroom, South Africa

Stadium: NWU Astro

4 December 2022
Seventh and eighth place

Canada	4 – 5	Pakistan
Davis 10'; Scholfield 29'; Johnston 48'; Tardif 53'	Report	Ahmad 3'; Murtaza 7'; Shahid 46'; Rana 54'; Bashir 58'

Potchefstroom, South Africa

Stadium: NWU Astro

=== 2023 ===
==== 2023 Men's Asian Champions Trophy ====
3 August 2023
Group stage

Malaysia	3 – 1	Pakistan
Firhan 28', 29'; Silverius 44'	Report	Rehman 55'

Chennai, India

Stadium: Mayor Radhakrishnan Hockey Stadium

4 August 2023
Group stage

South Korea	1 – 1	Pakistan
Yang 53'	Report	Shahid 18'

Chennai, India

Stadium: Mayor Radhakrishnan Hockey Stadium

6 August 2023
Group stage

Pakistan	3 – 3	Japan
Rana 9'; Khan 25', 55'	Report	Yamashita 13'; Kato 37'; Ohashi 45+'

Chennai, India

Stadium: Mayor Radhakrishnan Hockey Stadium

7 August 2023
Group stage

Pakistan	2 – 1	China
Khan 20'; Afraz 39'	Report	Gao 33'

Chennai, India

Stadium: Mayor Radhakrishnan Hockey Stadium

9 August 2023
Group stage

India	4 – 0	Pakistan
Harmanpreet 15', 23'; Jugraj 36'; Akashdeep 55'	Report

Chennai, India

Stadium: Mayor Radhakrishnan Hockey Stadium

11 August 2023
Fifth place game

Pakistan	6 – 1	China
Ammad 10', 52'; Khan 11', 12'; Shahid 15'; Rana 55'	Report	Chen Benhai 35'

Chennai, India

Stadium: Mayor Radhakrishnan Hockey Stadium

==== 2022 Asian Games ====
24 September 2023
Group stage

Pakistan	11 – 0	Singapore
Ahmad 7', 36', 42'; Rana 17'; Liaqat 19', 27', 44'; Afraz 26'; Rehman 28'; Ammad 42'; Su. Khan 46'	Report

Hangzhou, China

Stadium: Gongshu Canal Sports Park Field Hockey Field

26 September 2023
Group stage

Pakistan	5 – 2	Bangladesh
Afraz 30'; Sh. Khan 40'; Ammad 43'; Su. Khan 48'; Ahmad 57'	Report	Khisa 19'; Mi. Hossain 46'

Hangzhou, China

Stadium: Gongshu Canal Sports Park Field Hockey Field

28 September 2023
Group stage

Uzbekistan	2 – 18	Pakistan
Oblokulov 24'; Khudoynazarov 54'	Report	Liaqit 2'; R. Khan 2'; Ahmad 10', 20', 29', 45', 59'; Bhutta 12', 17'; Rehman 14', 53'; Sh. Khan 23'; Rana 23', 31', 42'; Afraz 29', 41', 55'

Hangzhou, China

Stadium: Gongshu Canal Sports Park Field Hockey Field

30 September 2023
Group stage

Pakistan	2 – 10	India
Su. Khan 38'; Afraz 45'	Report	Mandeep 8'; Harmanpreet 11', 17', 33', 34'; Sumit 30'; Varun 41', 54'; Shamsher 46'; Lalit 49'

Hangzhou, China

Stadium: Gongshu Canal Sports Park Field Hockey Field

2 October 2023
Group stage

Japan	3 – 2	Pakistan
K. Tanaka 6'; Fukuda 17'; Fujishima 28'	Report	Liaqat 5'; Ahmad 28'

Hangzhou, China

Stadium: Gongshu Canal Sports Park Field Hockey Field

6 October 2023
Fifth place game

Pakistan	5 – 2	Malaysia
Ahmad 8'; Rehman 37'; Rana 51'; Ammad 53'; Afraz 59'	Report	Aminudin 5'; Razie 58'

Hangzhou, China

Stadium: Gongshu Canal Sports Park Field Hockey Field

=== 2024 ===
==== 2024 Men's FIH Hockey Olympic Qualifiers ====
15 January 2024
Pool stage

Great Britain	6 – 1	Pakistan
Waller 10'; Ward 28', 41'; Calnan 43'; Wallace 52'; Bandurak 57'	Report	Shahid 50'

Muscat, Oman

Stadium: Hockey Oman

16 January 2024
Pool stage

Pakistan	2 – 0	China
Mahmood 42'; Rehman 51'	Report

Muscat, Oman

Stadium: Hockey Oman

18 January 2024
Pool stage

Pakistan	3 – 3	Malaysia
Khan 23'; Butt 33'; Rana 52'	Report	Saari 20'; Azrai 30'; Ashari 41'

Muscat, Oman

Stadium: Hockey Oman

20 January 2024
Semifinal

Germany	4 – 0	Pakistan
T. Grambusch 11'; Wellen 17', 40'; Weigand 39'	Report

Muscat, Oman

Stadium: Hockey Oman

21 January 2024
Third and fourth place

New Zealand	3 – 2	Pakistan
Boyde 24', 58'; Inglis 52'	Report	Mahmood 18', 24'

Muscat, Oman

Stadium: Hockey Oman

==== 2024 Sultan Azlan Shah Cup ====
4 May 2024
Pool stage

Malaysia	4 – 5	Pakistan
Abu 13', 28', 45'; Shello 59'	Report	S. Khan 9', 50', 59'; Hayat 53'; Mahmood 60'

Ipoh, Malaysia

Stadium: Azlan Shah Stadium

5 May 2024
Pool stage

South Korea	0 – 4	Pakistan
	Report	Shahid 3'; Liaqat 20'; Ali 27'; S. Khan 60'

Ipoh, Malaysia

Stadium: Azlan Shah Stadium

7 May 2024
Pool stage

Pakistan	1 – 1	Japan
Rana 59'	Report	Nagayoshi 33'

Ipoh, Malaysia

Stadium: Azlan Shah Stadium

8 May 2024
Pool stage

Pakistan	5 – 4	Canada
Mahmood 28', 29'; Liaqat 36'; Rana 44'; Ali 45'	Report	Davis 5', 45'; H. Sidhu 17'; Buttar 50'

Ipoh, Malaysia

Stadium: Azlan Shah Stadium

10 May 2024
Pool stage

New Zealand	1 – 1	Pakistan
Holmes 35'	Report	Mahmood 43'

Ipoh, Malaysia

Stadium: Azlan Shah Stadium

11 May 2024
Final

Japan	2 – 2	Pakistan
S. Tanaka 12'; Matsumoto 47'	Report	Ahmad 34'; Rehman 37'
Penalties
Kawabe (penalty shoot-out scored); Ooka (penalty shoot-out scored); S. Tanaka (penalty shoot-out scored); Matsumoto (penalty shoot-out scored)	4–1	(penalty shoot-out missed) Rana; (penalty shoot-out missed) Liaqat; (penalty shoot-out scored) Butt

Ipoh, Malaysia

Stadium: Azlan Shah Stadium

==== 2023–24 Men's FIH Hockey Nations Cup ====
31 May 2024
Pool stage

Malaysia	4 – 4	Pakistan
Fitri 4', 42'; Azrai 7'; Faizal 11'	Report	Rehman 32'; Khan 43'; Shahid 52'; Mahmood 60'

Gniezno, Poland

Stadium: Alfonsa Flinika Hockey Stadium

3 June 2024
Pool stage

Pakistan	8 – 1	Canada
Rana 7', 27', 58', 60'; Ali 36', 60'; Rehman 51'; Shahid 53'	Report	Davis 2'

Gniezno, Poland

Stadium: Alfonsa Flinika Hockey Stadium

5 June 2024
Pool stage

Pakistan	5 – 6	France
Mahmood 26'; Yaqoob 29'; Rana 46'; Rehman 52'; Shahid 56'	Report	Charlet 7', 25', 39', 59'; Rogeau 14'; Baumgarten 23'

Gniezno, Poland

Stadium: Alfonsa Flinika Hockey Stadium

8 June 2024
Semifinal

New Zealand	2 – 1	Pakistan
Russell 2'; Smith 11'	Report	Rana 55'

Gniezno, Poland

Stadium: Alfonsa Flinika Hockey Stadium

9 June 2024
Third and fourth place

Pakistan	3 – 4	South Africa
Mahmood 28'; Rehman 35'; Shahid 59'	Report	Mvimbi 20'; M. Cassiem 34', 58'; Horne 51'

Gniezno, Poland

Stadium: Alfonsa Flinika Hockey Stadium

==== 2024 Men's Asian Champions Trophy ====
8 September 2024
Group stage

Malaysia	2 – 2	Pakistan
Faizal 37'; Aiman 56'	Report	Sufyan 24'; Zikriya 32'

Hulunbuir, China

Stadium: Moqi Training Base

9 September 2024
Group stage

South Korea	2 – 2	Pakistan
Hyun 16'; Kim S. 60'	Report	Hannan 60', 60'

Hulunbuir, China

Stadium: Moqi Training Base

11 September 2024
Group stage

Pakistan	2 – 1	Japan
Nadeem 10'; Sufyan 21'	Report	Fujishima 28'

Hulunbuir, China

Stadium: Moqi Training Base

12 September 2024
Group stage

Pakistan	5 – 1	China
Rehman 23'; Nadeem 36', 56'; Hannan 46', 60'	Report	Gao 48'

Hulunbuir, China

Stadium: Moqi Training Base

14 September 2024
Group stage

India	2 – 1	Pakistan
Harmanpreet 13', 19'	Report	Nadeem 8'

Hulunbuir, China

Stadium: Moqi Training Base

16 September 2024
Semifinal

Pakistan	1 – 1	China
Nadeem 37'	Report	Lu 18'
Penalties
Liaqat (penalty shoot-out missed); Nadeem (penalty shoot-out missed); Ahmad (penalty shoot-out missed); Rehman (penalty shoot-out missed)	0–2	(penalty shoot-out scored) Chen; (penalty shoot-out scored) Lin; (penalty shoot-out missed) Lu; (penalty shoot-out missed) E

Hulunbuir, China

Stadium: Moqi Training Base

17 September 2024
Third and fourth place

Pakistan	5 – 2	South Korea
Sufyan 38', 49'; Hannan 39', 54'; Rooman 45'	Report	Jungjun 16'; Yang 40'

Hulunbuir, China

Stadium: Moqi Training Base
