= Pakistan national field hockey team tours and matches =

This page redirects to all the tours and matches of the Pakistan national field hockey team. These pages include all the official tour matches, competitions and unofficial matches that were sanctioned by the Pakistan Hockey Federation.

- Pakistan national field hockey team tours and matches (2025–2029)
- Pakistan national field hockey team tours and matches (2020–2024)
- Pakistan national field hockey team tours and matches (2015–2019)
- Pakistan national field hockey team tours and matches (2010–2014)
- Pakistan national field hockey team tours and matches (2005–2009)
- Pakistan national field hockey team tours and matches (2000–2004)
- Pakistan national field hockey team results (1990–1999)
- Pakistan national field hockey team results (1980–1989)
- Pakistan national field hockey team results (1970–1979)
- Pakistan national field hockey team results (1960–1969)
- Pakistan national field hockey team results (1948–1959)
