= Pakistan men's national field hockey team =

Men's national field hockey team representing Pakistan

Pakistan
- Nickname(s): Green Shirts; Green Machines
- Association: Pakistan Hockey Federation
- Confederation: Asian Hockey Federation
- Head Coach: Herman Kruis
- Assistant coach(es): Chris Bowen, Rehan Butt, Daniel Barry
- Manager: Muhammad Owais Qarni
- Captain: Abu Mahmood
- Most caps: Waseem Ahmed (410)
- Top scorer: Sohail Abbas (348)
Home	Away

FIH ranking
- Current: 12 (6 November 2026)
- Highest: 4 (2000)
- Lowest: 20 (Jul 2022)

First international
- Pakistan 2–1 Belgium (London, United Kingdom; 2 August 1948)

Biggest win
- Pakistan 22–0 Nepal (Madras, India; 26 December 1995)

Biggest defeat
- Pakistan 2–10 India (Hangzhou, China; 30 September 2023)

Olympic Games
- Appearances: 16 (first in 1948)
- Best result: (gold) 1st (1960, 1968, 1984)

World Cup
- Appearances: 14 (first in 1971)
- Best result: (gold) 1st (1971, 1978, 1982, 1994)

Asian Games
- Appearances: 18 (first in 1958)
- Best result: (gold) 1st (1958, 1962, 1970, 1974, 1978, 1982, 1990, 2010)

Asia Cup
- Appearances: 11 (first in 1982)
- Best result: (gold) 1st (1982, 1985, 1989)
Medal record
Event	1st	2nd	3rd
Olympic Games	3	3	2
World Cup	4	2	0
Asian Games	8	3	4
Asia Cup	3	3	3
Champions Trophy	3	7	6
Asian Champions Trophy	3	2	1
Commonwealth Games	0	1	1
Total	24	21	17
Olympic Games
Gold medal – first place	1960 Rome	Team
Gold medal – first place	1968 Mexico City	Team
Gold medal – first place	1984 Los Angeles	Team
Silver medal – second place	1956 Melbourne	Team
Silver medal – second place	1964 Tokyo	Team
Silver medal – second place	1972 Munich	Team
Bronze medal – third place	1976 Montreal	Team
Bronze medal – third place	1992 Barcelona	Team
World Cup
Gold medal – first place	1971 Barcelona	Team
Gold medal – first place	1978 Buenos Aires	Team
Gold medal – first place	1982 Bombay	Team
Gold medal – first place	1994 Sydney	Team
Silver medal – second place	1975 Kuala Lumpur	Team
Silver medal – second place	1990 Lahore	Team
Champions Trophy
Gold medal – first place	1978 Lahore	Team
Gold medal – first place	1980 Karachi	Team
Gold medal – first place	1994 Lahore	Team
Silver medal – second place	1983 Karachi	Team
Silver medal – second place	1984 Karachi	Team
Silver medal – second place	1988 Karachi	Team
Silver medal – second place	1991 Berlin	Team
Silver medal – second place	1996 Madras	Team
Silver medal – second place	1998 Lahore	Team
Silver medal – second place	2014 Bhubaneswar	Team
Bronze medal – third place	1986 Karachi	Team
Bronze medal – third place	1992 Berlin	Team
Bronze medal – third place	1995 Berlin	Team
Bronze medal – third place	2002 Cologne	Team
Bronze medal – third place	2003 Amstelveen	Team
Bronze medal – third place	2004 Lahore	Team
Bronze medal – third place	2012 Melbourne	Team
Asian Games
Gold medal – first place	1958 Tokyo	Team
Gold medal – first place	1962 Jakarta	Team
Gold medal – first place	1970 Bangkok	Team
Gold medal – first place	1974 Tehran	Team
Gold medal – first place	1978 Bangkok	Team
Gold medal – first place	1982 New Delhi	Team
Gold medal – first place	1990 Beijing	Team
Gold medal – first place	2010 Guangzhou	Team
Silver medal – second place	1966 Bangkok	Team
Silver medal – second place	1986 Seoul	Team
Silver medal – second place	2014 Incheon	Team
Bronze medal – third place	1994 Hiroshima	Team
Bronze medal – third place	1998 Bangkok	Team
Bronze medal – third place	2006 Doha	Team
Bronze medal – third place	2026 Aichi-Nagoya	Team
Asia Cup
Gold medal – first place	1982 Karachi	Team
Gold medal – first place	1985 Dhaka	Team
Gold medal – first place	1989 New Delhi	Team
Silver medal – second place	1999 Kuala Lumpur	Team
Silver medal – second place	2003 Kuala Lumpur	Team
Silver medal – second place	2009 Kuantan	Team
Bronze medal – third place	1994 Hiroshima	Team
Bronze medal – third place	2013 Ipoh	Team
Bronze medal – third place	2017 Dhaka	Team
Asian Champions Trophy
Gold medal – first place	2012 Doha	Team
Gold medal – first place	2013 Kakamigahara	Team
Gold medal – first place	2018 Muscat	Team
Silver medal – second place	2011 Ordos	Team
Silver medal – second place	2016 Kuantan	Team
Bronze medal – third place	2024 Hulunbuir	Team
Commonwealth Games
Silver medal – second place	2006 Melbourne	Team
Bronze medal – third place	2002 Manchester	Team

The Pakistan men's national field hockey team (Urdu: پاکستان قومى ہاكى ٹیم) represents Pakistan in international field hockey. Having played its first match in 1948, it is administered by the Pakistan Hockey Federation (PHF), the governing body for hockey in Pakistan. It has been a member of the International Hockey Federation (FIH) since 1948 and was founding member of the Asian Hockey Federation (ASHF), which was formed in 1958. Pakistan is one of the most successful national field hockey teams in the world, with three gold medals in Olympic field hockey (in 1960, 1968, and 1984) and four Hockey World Cup titles (in 1971, 1978, 1982, and 1994).

Since 1948, the Pakistan national team has played in every Olympic Games except the 1980 Games and the last three editions. They have also played in every FIH World Cup except the 2014 and 2023 editions. The Green Shirts are the most successful national team in the Asian Games, with eight gold medals: 1958, 1962, 1970, 1974, 1978, 1982, 1990, and 2010, and the only Asian team to have won the Champions Trophy thrice: 1978, 1980 and 1994. Pakistan has also won three Hockey Asia Cups: in 1982, 1985, and 1989. In total, Pakistan has won 30 official international titles.

Field hockey is the national sport of the country. Former captain Sohail Abbas has scored the second-most international goals in the history of international field hockey. Waseem Ahmed is the most-capped player for the team, having played 410 times between 1996 and 2013.

Pakistan is known for its fierce field hockey rivalry with India, with the two teams having played each other in eight Asian Games finals. In total, they have faced each other in fifteen major tournament finals, of which Pakistan has won nine. Pakistan's other notable competitive rivalries are with Netherlands and Australia.

Pakistan's home ground is National Hockey Stadium in Lahore. The current team's head coach is Khawaja Junaid and the team manager is Farrukh Atiq Khan.

== History ==
=== Early history and rising team (1948–1957) ===
Pakistan national field hockey team, before playing final against Netherlands in Barcelona (Spain) on 4 November 1950 during the Barcelona International Hockey Festival

Originally, the game had been brought by British servicemen to British India, and like cricket it soon became a popular sport with the local population. Following the independence of Pakistan in 1947, soon after the Pakistan Hockey Federation came into being in 1948. Prior to the partition of India, players playing for Pakistan competed for the Indian side. The Federation soon established and organized the Provincial Hockey/Sports Associations of West Punjab, East Bengal, Sindh, Balochistan, Khyber-Pakhtunkhwa, Bahawalpur & Services Sports Board.

Despite the limited resources available on 2 August 1948, Pakistan national team, led by Ali Iqtidar Shah Dara, officially went on to play their first international game against Belgium winning the game 2–1 at the 1948 London Olympics. Pakistan remained unbeaten during the group stage, defeating the Netherlands, Denmark and France, but ended up placing fourth overall. During the group stages Pakistan defeat of Netherlands by 6–1 was the highlight for the team.

At the 1952 Olympics in Helsinki, Pakistan lost to Netherlands and Great Britain to again finish fourth at the event. Pakistan won their first Olympic medal in 1956 at Melbourne when they reached the final but lost to India 1–0 to earn a silver medal, first podium finish this was also Pakistan's first medal at the Olympics.

=== The Golden Era (1958–1984) ===
Field hockey was included in the Asian Games for the first time in 1958 at Tokyo. Pakistan were drawn against Japan, South Korea, Malaysia and archrivals India. They beat Japan 5–0 in their first match, then followed two consecutive victories over South Korea (8–0) and Malaysia (6–0). In the last match Pakistan drew 0–0 with India finishing top of the table in the round-robin format and clinched its first gold medal in an international competition.

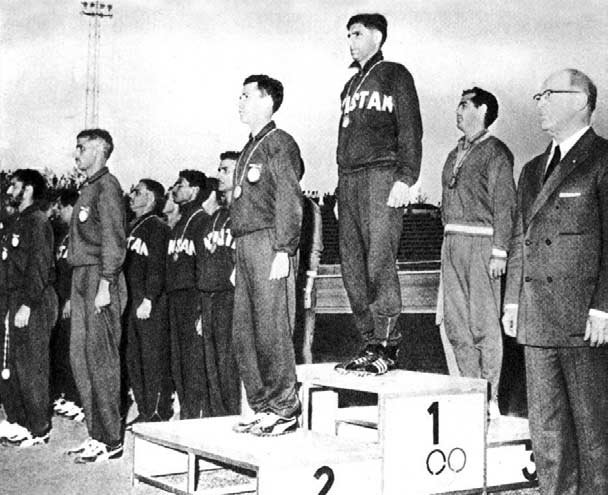
Medal ceremony for the gold medalist Pakistan hockey team at the 1960 Olympic games in Rome

In 1960 Rome Olympics where Pakistan played against in a group with Australia, Poland and Japan, winning all the matches. Pakistan then played the quarter-final round with Germany, winning the match 2–1 and advanced to the semi-final round where they defeated Spain. Pakistan eventually won the gold medal, defeating India 1–0 with a goal by Naseer Bunda in the final round held at the Olympic Velodrome and ended India's run of six successive gold medals at the Summer Olympic Games.

In the 1962 Asian Games, Pakistan earned its second gold medal with Chaudhry Ghulam Rasool as the captain leading the team to another successive award. However, during the 1964 Tokyo Olympics the national team ended up as runners-up for the second time after losing 1–0 to India in the final as well as finishing runners-up in the 1966 Asian Games held in Bangkok, Thailand. Pakistan won its second Olympic Games gold medal in Mexico at the 1968 Summer Olympics. It fielded what has since then often been considered the best hockey squad ever led by captain Tariq Aziz with Saeed Anwar, Khalid Mahmood, Gulraiz Akhtar and Tariq Niazi. Even though Rasool had retired, this team was still a force to be reckoned with. They won all six of their games—against Kenya, Great Britain, Malaysia, Australia, France and the Netherlands during group play, and against West Germany in the knockout round. Pakistan made the final for the fourth straight Olympics, and won the gold medal, as they had in 1960, this time by defeating Australia, 2–1 with goals from Muhammad Asad Malik and Abdul Rashid. Rashid was the top scorer for Pakistan with seven goals; Tanvir Dar finished with six goals.

In the group stage of the 1970 Asian Games, Pakistan was competing with tournament hosts Thailand and contenders Japan for top spot and a place in the finals. In their first match of the group, Pakistan scored thrice against Japan to clinch their first win, followed by defeating Hong Kong 10–0 to go to the top of the group. The team then drew 0–0 with Thailand and progressed to the knock-out round, where they won 5–0 over Malaysia. In the final, Pakistan faced India, winning 1–0 and sealing their third Asian Games gold medal.

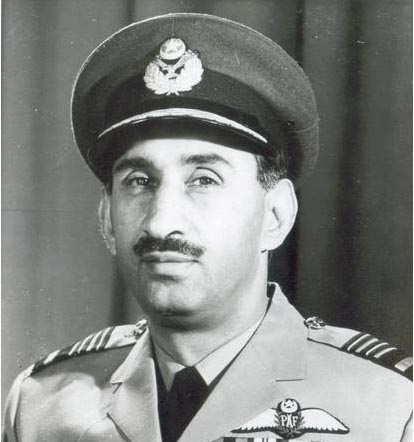
PHF President (1967–69, 1976–84) Air Marshal Nur Khan conceived the idea of Hockey World Cup to FIH in 1969 and founded the Champions Trophy in 1978.

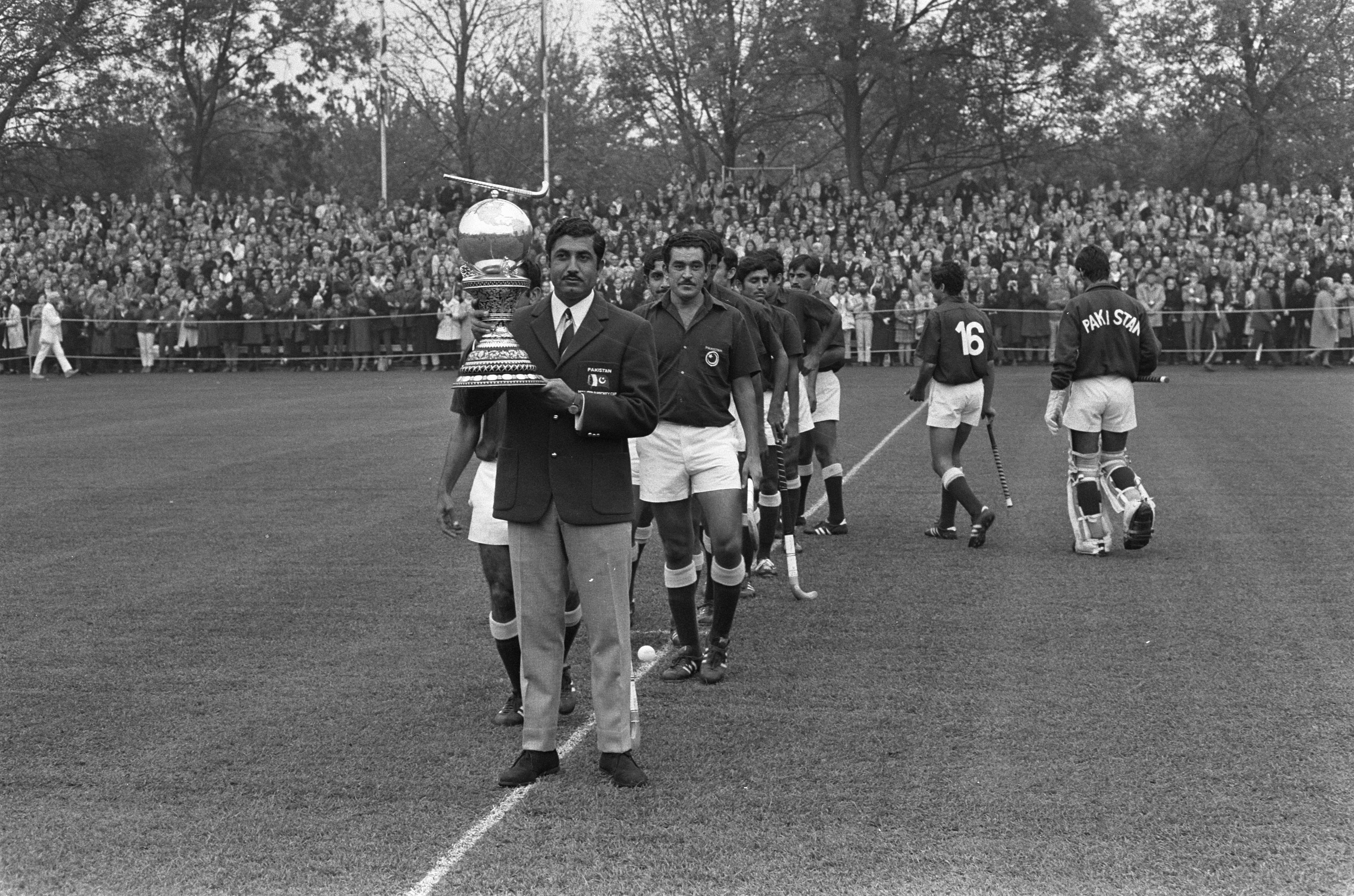
Pakistan with the 1971 Men's Hockey World Cup trophy

In 1971, the first-ever Hockey World Cup was to be hosted by Pakistan. However, political issues would prevent that first competition from being played in Pakistan. The FIH had inadvertently scheduled the first World Cup to be played in Pakistan during the Bangladesh Liberation War. Furthermore, Pakistan and India had been at war with each other only six years earlier. When Pakistan invited India to compete in the tournament, a crisis arose. Pakistanis, led by cricketer Abdul Hafeez Kardar, protested against India's participation in the Hockey World Cup. Given the intense political climate between Pakistan and India, the FIH decided to move the tournament elsewhere. In March 1971, coincidentally in the same month Bangladesh declared independence from Pakistan, the FIH decided to move the first Hockey World Cup to the Real Club de Polo grounds in Barcelona, Spain, which was considered a neutral and peaceful European site.

The Pakistani team was drawn in a group with hosts Spain, Australia, Japan and the Netherlands. The group was topped by Spain and Pakistan respectively, and both the teams advanced into the semi-finals. In the first semi-final of the tournament Pakistan ousted India 2–1 in a tense and closely contested game and in the second semi-final Spain played safe and defeated a spirited Kenya 1–0 to enter the finals against Pakistan. In the final Pakistan scored early but then strengthened its defense to hold out for a 1–0 victory and win the first hockey World Cup, retaining its number one position in the world hockey rankings, closely followed by India and the Netherlands. Tanvir Dar finished as the top goal scorer at the tournament with eight goals. The 1972 Munich Olympics, Pakistan lost the final to hosts West Germany losing the game 1–0 with a goal by Michael Krause and finished at fourth place, the following year, in the 1973 Hockey World Cup. The national team made a comeback in the international competition, by winning and retaining their title at the 1974 Asian Games but lost to their rivals India in the finals of the third hockey World Cup in 1975. 1976 Montreal Olympics saw the team secure their first bronze medal in the competition.

The year 1978 saw Pakistan national team win three major international tournaments: the third Hockey World Cup held at Buenos Aires, Argentina along with 1978 Asian Games and the first Champions Trophy. This was the first time a national team won three major titles in the history of international field hockey. In 1980, Pakistan Olympic Association, along with 65 countries, boycotted the 1980 Moscow Olympics because of the Soviet invasion of Afghanistan. This resulted in Pakistan hockey team not participating at the field hockey competition at the tournament. Pakistan hosted the 1980 and 1981 Champions Trophy tournaments, winning the title against West Germany in the final round in 1980 and finishing at fourth position a year later, held at the Hockey Club of Pakistan, Karachi. In the 1980s Pakistan won every international tournament it participated in including the 1982 World Cup in Mumbai and the 1984 Olympics in Los Angeles where Pakistan won the gold medal defeating West Germany in the final. Pakistan also won the Asian Games and Asia Cup consecutively in this period.

=== Last years of prominence (1985–1994) ===
At the 1986 World Cup in London, Pakistan performed poorly, where they won just one pool game and finished second last at 11th place. Pakistan first finished runner-up at the 1990 World Cup at home in Lahore after losing the final to Netherlands and won a bronze medal at the 1992 Olympics in Barcelona. The most glorious highlight of the decade came in 1994 when Pakistan first won the 1994 Champions Trophy at home ground, their first title in the competition after 14 years.

=== Decline (1995–Present) ===
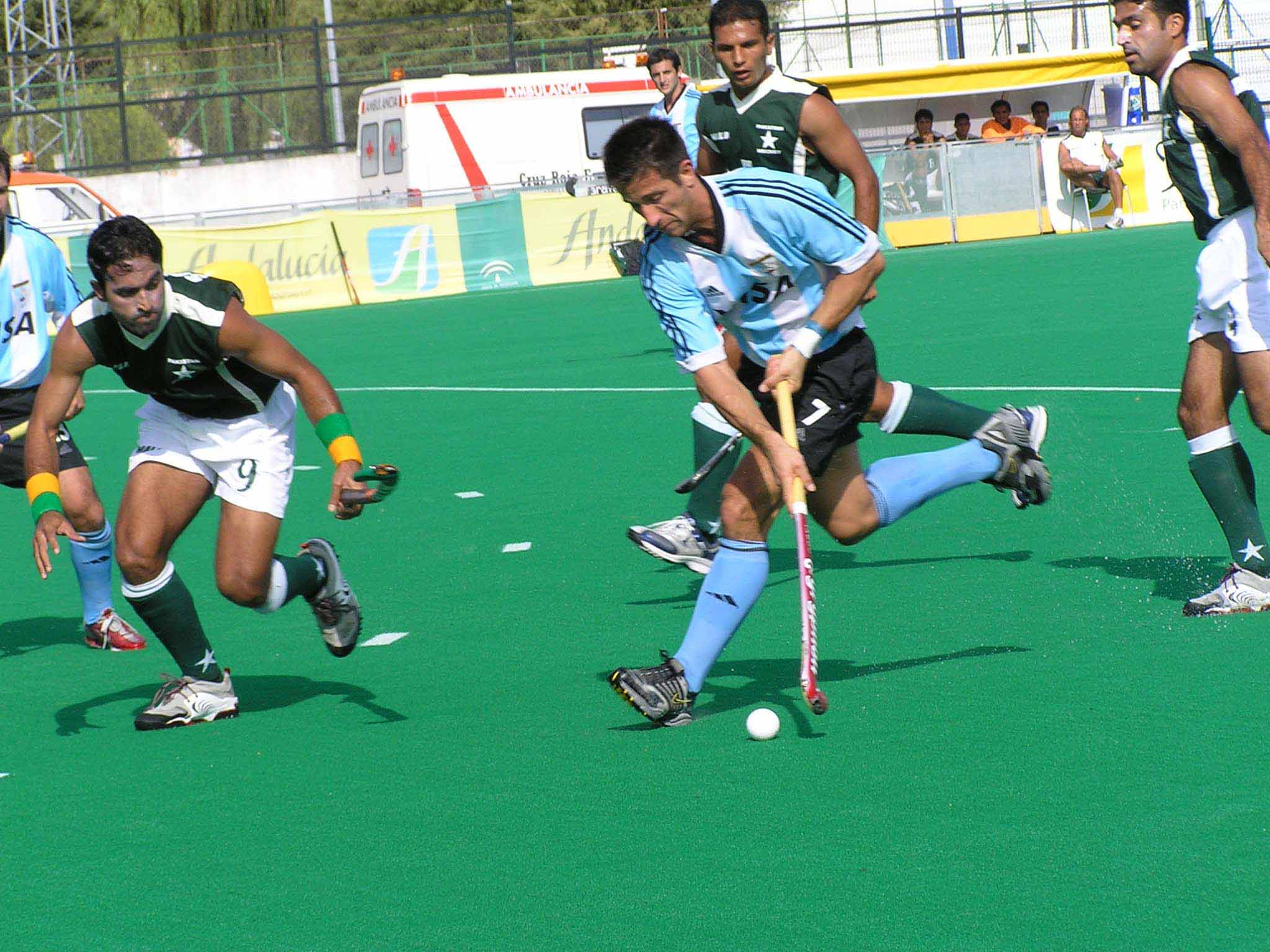
Pakistan playing against Argentina in 2005

Following a sixth place finish at the 1996 Atlanta games, the first major competition for Pakistan was the 1998 Hockey World Cup in Utrecht Pakistan finished 5th at the tournament. The following year Pakistan won the Sultan Azlan Shah Cup for the first time in 1999. Pakistan finished fourth at the 2000 Olympics in Sydney after losing the bronze medal match to Australia. This was the last time Pakistan played for a medal at the Olympics. Pakistan finished 5th at 2002 World Cup and Kuala Lumpur and won bronze medal at the Champions Trophy the same year. At the 2002 Asian Games Pakistan finished fourth, the first time the team didn't won a medal at the competition. In 2003 Pakistan lost the Hockey Asia Cup final to India and in 2004 Pakistan had a busy schedule where they played in many tournaments in lead up to the Olympics but Pakistan finished 5th at the 2004 Athens Olympics later in December Pakistan finished third at the 2004 Champions Trophy in Lahore, the third consecutive bronze medal. In 2005 Pakistan had a highlight when they defeated Olympic champion Australia to win the 2005 Hockey RaboTrophy in Netherlands. Pakistan finished 6th the 2006 World Cup and failed even to progress from the pool stages of the 2007 Asia Cup.

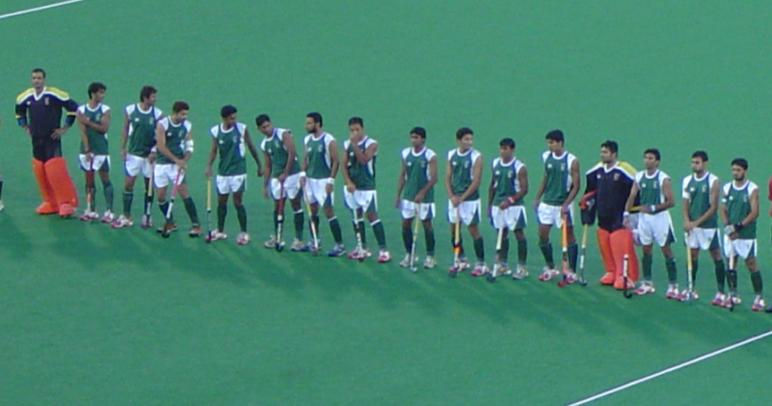
The national team at the 2008 Summer Olympics in Beijing

The 2008 Beijing Olympics proved to be the worst performance of the team at the event where they finished 8th. The year 2010 started with another record worst performance at the 2010 World Cup in New Delhi where the team finished last at 12th place but later in the same year Pakistan had a major success by winning the gold medal at the 2010 Asian Games in China. In 2011 Pakistan played in many minor tournaments in lead up to the 2012 Olympics where they finished 7th. Later in the year 2012 Pakistan won bronze medal at the 2012 Champions Trophy in Melbourne after upsetting tournaments favorites like Germany. The Pakistani national team most successful tournament, in this period, was the Asian Hockey Champions Trophy winning the trophy first in 2012 against India and finishing as runners-up in the first edition of Asian Hockey Champions Trophy in 2011. During this period despite not any major team honor won the Pakistan team had world renowned individual players in world hockey in the likes of Sohail Abbas who remained top scorer at the 2002 World Cup and 2004 Olympics, he later broke the record of highest goalscorer in international hockey with a total of 348 goals and Rehan Butt who was twice voted as the Best Asian Player by Asian Hockey Federation, Shakeel Abbasi, Salman Akbar and Muhammad Saqlain.

Pakistan, after having failed to get a direct entrance for the 2014 World Cup, were handed a last chance to qualify for the event by winning the 2013 Asia Cup, but they finished third and failed to qualify for the World Cup for the first time in their history. Pakistan failed to qualify for the Olympics for the first time at Rio 2016 after failing a qualification berth at the 2014–15 FIH Hockey World League. From 2016 to 2017, Pakistan performed poorly in different competitions even featuring a record 9–1 defeat against Australia in 2017. In 2018, Roelant Oltmans of Netherlands was brought in as coach and the team showed some improvement, but still performed poorly at the 2018 World Cup, failing to win a single match. Pakistan again failed to qualify for the 2020 Olympics in Tokyo, losing the Olympic Qualifiers against Netherlands over a two-legged tie in 2019.

PHF announced Pakistan's participation in the 2021 Asian Champions Trophy, the team's first appearance in an international competition after a gap of two years. A 20-man squad was announced with Siegfried Aikman as head coach prior to the tournament. They did not perform well and finished 4th. Pakistan also could not qualify for the 2023 World Cup despite it being a 16-team event. Pakistan participated in the 2022 Commonwealth Games where they performed poorly and finished 7th. In December 2022, Pakistan participated in the 2022 Nations cup where Pakistan finished 7th. In July 2023, Shahnaz Sheikh was appointed as the head coach for the 2023 Men's Asian Champions Trophy. In August, PHF announced a 36-man squad for the Asian Games. At the Games, Pakistan lost to India 10–2, which was the biggest defeat in their history. They finished 5th overall. Pakistan also failed to qualify for the 2024 Summer Olympics, their third consecutive absence from the Games.

Pakistan received an invitation from FIH to compete in the 2025–26 FIH Pro League, where they failed to win or draw a single game out of 16 games and thus finished in last place. In August 2026, Pakistan competed in the 2026 Hockey World Cup. They finished 11th among 16 teams. It was their best finish since the 2006 World Cup.

== Logo and stadium ==
The motif of the Pakistan national field hockey team has a star and crescent on a dark green field; with a vertical white stripe at the hoist, usually in green, white color, as represented in the flag of Pakistan.

Pakistan played at a number of different venues across the country, though by 1978, this had largely settled down to having National Hockey Stadium (also known as Gaddafi Hockey Stadium, named after former Libyan leader Muammar Gaddafi) in Lahore as the primary venue, with Faisalabad Hockey Stadium and the Hockey Club of Pakistan used on occasions where the National Hockey Stadium was unavailable for home matches. The stadium is considered to be the largest international field hockey stadium in the world, and holds a capacity of 45,000 spectators.

The Pakistan Hockey Federation (PHF) has its headquarters at the stadium. Pakistan has hosted many international matches and competitions such as the Hockey Asia Cup of 1982 and Champions Trophy tournament in 1978, 1980, 1981, 1983, 1984, 1986, 1988, 1992, 1994, 1998, and 2004 along with the 1990 Hockey World Cup, where Pakistan lost 3–1 to the Netherlands in the final.

== Honors and recognition ==
Since its breakthrough in the 1948 Summer Olympics, Pakistan has won more than 20 official titles, which are detailed below:

- Summer Olympics:
  - Gold medal: 1960 Rome, 1968 Mexico City, 1984 Los Angeles
  - Silver medal: 1956 Melbourne, 1964 Tokyo, 1972 Munich
  - Bronze medal: 1976 Montreal, 1992 Barcelona
- World Cup:
  - Gold medal: 1971, 1978, 1982, 1994
  - Silver medal: 1975, 1990
- Champions Trophy:
  - Gold medal: 1978, 1980, 1994
  - Silver medal: 1983, 1984, 1988, 1991, 1996, 1998, 2014
  - Bronze medal: 1986, 1992, 1995, 2002, 2003, 2004, 2012
- Sultan Azlan Shah Cup:
  - Gold medal: 1999, 2000, 2003
  - Silver medal: 1983, 1987, 1991, 1994, 2004, 2011, 2024
  - Bronze medal: 1985, 2005, 2022
- Asian Champions Trophy:
  - Gold medal: 2012, 2013, 2018
  - Silver medal: 2011, 2016
  - Bronze medal: 2024
- Asia Cup:
  - Gold medal: 1982, 1985, 1989
  - Silver medal: 1999, 2003, 2009
  - Bronze medal: 1994, 2013, 2017
- Asian Games:
  - Gold medal: 1958, 1962, 1970, 1974, 1978, 1982, 1990, 2010
  - Silver medal: 1966, 1986, 2014
  - Bronze medal: 1994, 1998, 2006, 2026
- Commonwealth Games:
  - Silver medal: 2006
  - Bronze medal: 2002
- South Asian Games:
  - Gold medal: 2006, 2010, 2016
  - Silver medal: 1995
- Afro-Asian Games:
  - Silver medal: 2003
- Hockey Champions Challenge:
  - Silver medal: 2009
- FIH Hockey Nations Cup:
  - Silver medal: 2025

== Competitive record ==
=== Team performance ===
TBD (to be determined), DNQ (did not qualify), DNP (did not participate)

Summer Olympics
Year	Host city	Position	Pld	W	D	L	GF	GA
1948	London, United Kingdom	4th	6	4	0	2	21	6
1952	Helsinki, Finland	4th	3	1	0	2	7	3
1956	Melbourne, Australia	2nd	5	3	1	1	10	4
1960	Rome, Italy	1st	6	6	0	0	25	1
1964	Tokyo, Japan	2nd	8	7	0	1	20	4
1968	Mexico City, Mexico	1st	9	9	0	0	26	6
1972	Munich, West Germany	2nd	9	6	1	2	19	7
1976	Montreal, Canada	3rd	6	4	1	1	20	10
1980	Moscow, Soviet Union	DNP						
1984	Los Angeles, United States	1st	7	4	3	0	19	8
1988	Seoul, South Korea	5th	7	5	0	2	18	9
1992	Barcelona, Spain	3rd	7	6	0	1	25	11
1996	Atlanta, United States	6th	7	3	1	3	14	12
2000	Sydney, Australia	4th	7	2	3	2	18	13
2004	Athens, Greece	5th	7	5	0	2	26	10
2008	Beijing, China	8th	6	2	0	4	13	17
2012	London, United Kingdom	7th	6	3	1	2	12	18
2016	Rio de Janeiro, Brazil	DNQ						
2020	Tokyo, Japan	DNQ						
2024	Paris, France	DNQ						
2028	Los Angeles, United States	TBD						
Total		1st	106	70	11	25	293	139

==== Summer Olympics Qualifiers ====
Summer Olympics Qualifiers
Year	Host	Position	Result	Pld	W	D	L	GF	GA
2000	Osaka, Japan	Runners-up	Qualified to 2000 Summer Olympics	7	4	1	2	17	13
2004	Madrid, Spain	3rd	Qualified to 2004 Summer Olympics	7	5	1	1	21	11
2019	Amstelveen, Netherlands	–	Failed to Qualify to 2020 Summer Olympics	2	0	1	1	5	10
2024	Muscat, Oman	4th	Failed to Qualify to 2024 Summer Olympics	5	1	1	3	8	16
	Total		Runners-up	21	10	4	7	51	50

World Cup
Year	Host city	Position
1971	Barcelona, Spain	1st
1973	Amstelveen, Netherlands	4th
1975	Kuala Lumpur, Malaysia	2nd
1978	Buenos Aires, Argentina	1st
1982	Mumbai, India	1st
1986	London, England	11th
1990	Lahore, Pakistan	2nd
1994	Sydney, Australia	1st
1998	Utrecht, Netherlands	5th
2002	Kuala Lumpur, Malaysia	5th
2006	Mönchengladbach, Germany	6th
2010	New Delhi, India	12th
2014	The Hague, Netherlands	DNQ
2018	Bhubaneswar, India	12th
2023	Bhubaneswar, India	DNQ
2026	Wavre, Belgium/ Amstelveen, Netherlands	11th

==== World Cup Qualifiers ====
World Cup Qualifiers
Year	Host	Position	Result	Pld	W	D	L	GF	GA
2006	Changzhou, China	4th	Qualified to 2006 World Cup	7	3	2	2	12	12
2009	Lille, France	Champions	Qualified to 2010 World Cup	6	5	0	1	25	7
2026	Ismailia, Egypt	Runners-up	Qualified to 2026 World Cup	5	4	0	1	19	16
	Total		1 Title	18	12	2	4	56	35

Champions Trophy
Year	Host city	Position
1978	Lahore, Pakistan	1st
1980	Karachi, Pakistan	1st
1981	Karachi, Pakistan	4th
1982	Amstelveen, Netherlands	4th
1983	Karachi, Pakistan	2nd
1984	Karachi, Pakistan	2nd
1985	Perth, Australia	4th
1986	Karachi, Pakistan	3rd
1987	Amstelveen, Netherlands	7th
1988	Karachi, Pakistan	2nd
1989	Berlin, West Germany	4th
1990	Melbourne, Australia	4th
1991	Berlin, Germany	2nd
1992	Karachi, Pakistan	4th
1993	Kuala Lumpur, Malaysia	4th
1994	Lahore, Pakistan	1st
1995	Berlin, Germany	3rd
1996	Madras, India	2nd
1997	Adelaide, Australia	5th
1998	Lahore, Pakistan	2nd
1999	Brisbane, Australia	6th
2000	Amstelveen, Netherlands	DNP
2001	Rotterdam, Netherlands	4th
2002	Cologne, Germany	3rd
2003	Amstelveen, Netherlands	3rd
2004	Lahore, Pakistan	3rd
2005	Chennai, India	5th
2006	Terrassa, Spain	5th
2007	Kuala Lumpur, Malaysia	7th
2008	Rotterdam, Netherlands	DNP
2009	Melbourne, Australia	DNP
2010	Mönchengladbach, Germany	DNP
2011	Auckland, New Zealand	7th
2012	Melbourne, Australia	3rd
2014	Bhubaneswar, India	2nd
2016	London, England	DNP
2018	Breda, Netherlands	6th

Sultan Azlan Shah Cup
Year	Host city	Position
1983	Kuala Lumpur, Malaysia	2nd
1985	Ipoh, Malaysia	3rd
1987	Ipoh, Malaysia	2nd
1991	Ipoh, Malaysia	2nd
1994	Penang, Malaysia	2nd
1995	Kuala Lumpur, Malaysia	DNP
1996	Ipoh, Malaysia	DNP
1998	Ipoh, Malaysia	1st
1999	Kuala Lumpur, Malaysia	DNP
2000	Kuala Lumpur, Malaysia	1st
2001	Kuala Lumpur, Malaysia	4th
2003	Kuala Lumpur, Malaysia	1st
2004	Kuala Lumpur, Malaysia	2nd
2005	Kuala Lumpur, Malaysia	3rd
2006	Kuala Lumpur, Malaysia	5th
2007	Ipoh, Malaysia	6th
2008	Ipoh, Malaysia	4th
2009	Ipoh, Malaysia	4th
2010	Ipoh, Malaysia	5th
2011	Ipoh, Malaysia	2nd
2012	Ipoh, Malaysia	7th
2013	Ipoh, Malaysia	6th
2014	Ipoh, Malaysia	2nd
2015	Ipoh, Malaysia	DNP
2016	Ipoh, Malaysia	5th
2017	Ipoh, Malaysia	DNP
2018	Ipoh, Malaysia	DNP
2019	Ipoh, Malaysia	DNP
2022	Ipoh, Malaysia	3rd
2024	Ipoh, Malaysia	2nd
2025	Ipoh, Malaysia	DNP

Asian Champions Trophy
Year	Host city	Position
2011	Ordos, China	2nd
2012	Doha, Qatar	1st
2013	Kakamigahara, Japan	1st
2016	Kuantan, Malaysia	2nd
2018	Muscat, Oman	1st
2021	Dhaka, Bangladesh	4th
2023	Chennai, India	5th
2024	Hulunbuir, China	3rd
2026	Punjab, India	DNP

Asia Cup
Year	Host city	Position
1982	Karachi, Pakistan	1st
1985	Dhaka, Bangladesh	1st
1989	New Delhi, India	1st
1994	Hiroshima, Japan	3rd
1999	Kuala Lumpur, Malaysia	2nd
2003	Kuala Lumpur, Malaysia	2nd
2007	Chennai, India	6th
2009	Kuantan, Malaysia	2nd
2013	Ipoh, Malaysia	3rd
2017	Dhaka, Bangladesh	3rd
2022	Jakarta, Indonesia	5th
2025	Rajgir, India	DNP

Asian Games
Year	Host city	Position
1958	Tokyo, Japan	1st
1962	Jakarta, Indonesia	1st
1966	Bangkok, Thailand	2nd
1970	Bangkok, Thailand	1st
1974	Tehran, Iran	1st
1978	Bangkok, Thailand	1st
1982	New Delhi, India	1st
1986	Seongnam, South Korea	2nd
1990	Beijing, China	1st
1994	Hiroshima, Japan	3rd
1998	Bangkok, Thailand	3rd
2002	Busan, South Korea	4th
2006	Doha, Qatar	3rd
2010	Guangzhou, China	1st
2014	Incheon, South Korea	2nd
2018	Jakarta-Palembang, Indonesia	4th
2022	Hangzhou, China	5th
2026	Aichi and Nagoya, Japan	3rd

Commonwealth Games
Year	Host city	Position
1998	Kuala Lumpur, Malaysia	10th
2002	Manchester, England	3rd
2006	Melbourne, Australia	2nd
2010	New Delhi, India	6th
2014	Glasgow, Scotland	DNP
2018	Gold Coast, Australia	7th
2022	Birmingham, England	7th

==== Pro League ====
Pro League
Year	Host	Position	Pld	W	D	L	GF	GA
2020–21	N/A	DNP						
2021–22	N/A	DNQ						
2022–23	N/A	DNQ						
2023–24	N/A	DNQ						
2024–25	N/A	DNQ						
2025–26	N/A	9th	16	0	0	16	22	79
2026–27	N/A	DNQ						

South Asian Games
Year	Host city	Position
1995	Madras, India	2nd
2006	Colombo, Sri Lanka	1st
2010	Dhaka, Bangladesh	1st
2016	Guwahati, India	1st
2027	Pakistan	TBD

Nations Cup
Year	Host city	Position
2022	Potchefstroom, South Africa	7th
2023–24	Gniezno, Poland	4th
2024–25	Kuala Lumpur, Malaysia	2nd
2026–27	TBD	

Hockey World League
Year	Host	Round	Position	Pld	W	D	L	GF	GA
2012–13	Johor Bahru, Malaysia	Semifinals	7th place	6	2	2	2	22	17
2014–15	Antwerp, Belgium	Semifinals	8th place	7	1	2	4	9	16
2016–17	London, England	Semifinals	7th place	7	2	0	5	9	28
Total				20	5	4	11	40	61

Champions Challenge
Year	Host city	Position
2009	Salta, Argentina	2nd

Afro-Asian Games
Year	Host city	Position
2003	Hyderabad, India	2nd

== Records ==
As of 27 October 2019

Players in bold text are still active with Pakistan.

=== Top goal scorers ===
Rank	Player	Goals	Matches	Career	Ref
1	Sohail Abbas	348	311	1998–2012	
2	Hassan Sardar	150	148	1979–1987	
3	Tahir Zaman	134	252	1987–1998	
4	Kamran Ashraf	129	166	1993–2002	
5	Hanif Khan	127	177	1976–1985	
6	Rehan Butt	110	274	2002–2012	[?]
7	Muhammad Imran	106	289	2004–2015	[?]
8	Shakeel Abbasi	103	309	2003–2014	
9	Manzoor-ul-Hassan	101	154	1972–1982	
10	Shahbaz Ahmed	101	304	1986–2002	

=== Most-capped players ===
Rank	Player	Matches	Goals	Career	Ref
1	Waseem Ahmed	410	10	1996–2013	
2	Sohail Abbas	311	348	1998–2012	[?]
3	Shakeel Abbasi	309	103	2003–2014	
4	Shahbaz Ahmed	304	101	1986–2002	
5	Muhammad Imran	289	106	2004–2015	[?]
6	Rehan Butt	274	110	2002–2012	[?]
7	Tahir Zaman	252	134	1987–1998	
8	Mansoor Ahmed	238	0	1986–1997	
9	Zeeshan Ashraf	235	3	2001–2010	[?]
10	Muhammad Saqlain	233	32	1999–2009	[?]
11	**Muhammed Umar Bhutta**	204	57	2009–present	

== Team ==
=== Current players ===
Roster for the 2026 Men's FIH Hockey World Cup.

Head coach: Bob Veldhof

1. Waqar Ali (GK)
2. Muhammad Abdullah
5. Sufyan Khan
7. Moin Shakeel
8. Waheed Rana
9. Hannan Shahid
10. Zikriya Hayat
11. Arshad Liaqat
13. Adeel Latif
14. Ahmad Nadeem
15. Ghazanfar Ali
16. Ammad Butt
17. Muhammad Hammadudin
18. Abdul Rehman
21. Afraz Hakeem
24. Umar Mustafa
27. Abu Mahmood (C)
31. Ali Raza (GK)
32. Abdul Manan
35. Muhammad Ammad

=== Coaching Staff ===
Position	Name
Head Coach	(Netherlands) Herman Kruis
Coaching Advisor	(Netherlands) Herman Kruis
Assistant Coach	(England) Chris Bowen, (Pakistan) Rehan Butt, (Australia) Daniel Barry
Fitness and High-Performance Coach	(Australia) David Dwyer
Junior Talent Identification Coach	(Pakistan) Adnan Zakir
Goalkeeping Coach	(Netherlands) Bob Johan Veldhof
Sports Psychologist	(England) Chris Bowen
High-Performance Strength & Conditioning Specialist	(Australia) Daniel Barry

== Results and fixtures ==
All times are (UTC+5).

=== 2025 ===
2025 Asia Play-offs

13 November 2025 Asia Play-offs	Bangladesh	2–8	Pakistan	Dhaka, Bangladesh
13:00	Hossain 15'; Islam 58'	Report	Butt 4'; Nadeem 19', 56'; Afraz 24', 30'; Ali 32'; Rana 44'; Shahid 47'	Stadium: Maulana Bhasani Hockey Stadium

14 November 2025 Asia Play-offs	Bangladesh	0–8	Pakistan	Dhaka, Bangladesh
14:00		Report	Sufyan 6', 19'; Rana 13', 57'; Rana 30+'; Shahid 32'; Afraz 53'; Butt 19'	Stadium: Maulana Bhasani Hockey Stadium

16 November 2025 Asia Play-offs	Bangladesh	3–10	Pakistan	Dhaka, Bangladesh
13:00	Abdullah 19'; Hasan 44'; Islam	Report	Sufyan 8', 10', 16', 29', 34', 57'; Rehman 15', 59'; Nadeem 40'; Rana 52' 57'	Stadium: Maulana Bhasani Hockey Stadium

2025–26 Men's FIH Pro League

10 December 2025 2025–26 Men's FIH Pro League	Netherlands	5–2	Pakistan	Santiago del Estero, Argentina
03:00	Bijen 12'; Boers 15', 44'; Reyenga 36'; Telgenkamp 41'	Report	Shahid 9'; Khan 18'	Stadium: Santiago del Estero Hockey Club

12 December 2025 2025–26 Men's FIH Pro League	Argentina	3–2	Pakistan	Santiago del Estero, Argentina
03:00	Domene 19'; Torre 41'; Casella 42'	Report	Ammad 36'; Rana 45+'	Stadium: Santiago del Estero Hockey Club

13 December 2025 2025–26 Men's FIH Pro League	Pakistan	3–7	Netherlands	Santiago del Estero, Argentina
03:00	Khan 39', 60'; Rana 55'	Report	Dam 17'; Brinkman 22', 45'; Jansen 23', 51'; Boers 52'; Croon 59'	Stadium: Santiago del Estero Hockey Club

15 December 2025 2025–26 Men's FIH Pro League	Argentina	5–1	Pakistan	Santiago del Estero, Argentina
03:00	Torre 7'; Capurro 15', 21'; Martins 37'; Domene 39'	Report	Rana 34'	Stadium: Santiago del Estero Hockey Club

=== 2026 ===
2025–26 Men's FIH Pro League

10 February 2026 2025–26 Men's FIH Pro League	Australia	3–2	Pakistan	Hobart, Australia
11:30	Brand 2', 19'; Govers 58'	Report	Nadeem 49'; Khan 53'	Stadium: Tasmanian Hockey Centre

11 February 2026 2025–26 Men's FIH Pro League	Pakistan	2–5	Germany	Hobart, Australia
11:30	Ammad 18'; Khan 57'	Report	Rühr 6'; Grambusch 17'; Schwarzhaupt 25'; Hellwig 41'; Hartkopf 42'	Stadium: Tasmanian Hockey Centre

13 February 2026 2025–26 Men's FIH Pro League	Australia	3–0	Pakistan	Hobart, Australia
11:30	Govers 14', 34'; Welch 42'	Report		Stadium: Tasmanian Hockey Centre

14 February 2026 2025–26 Men's FIH Pro League	Germany	6–1	Pakistan	Hobart, Australia
09:30	Sperling 26'; Warweg 28', 36'; Ludwig 30'; Mertgens 32'; Hartkopf 54'	Report	Rana 18'	Stadium: Tasmanian Hockey Centre

2026 Men's FIH Hockey World Cup Qualifiers

01 March 2026 Preliminary round	Pakistan	5–4	China	Ismailia, Egypt
18:00	Khan 8'; Rana 20'; Ammad 21'; Mahmood 35'; Waleed 43'	Report	Du 16', 39'; Guan 42'; Zhang 49'	Stadium: Suez Canal Stadium

02 March 2026 Preliminary round	Pakistan	5–3	Malaysia	Ismailia, Egypt
16:00	Rana 13'; Hayat 16'; Nadeem 45+'; Khan 49'; Ammad 56'	Report	Abdu Rauf 12'; Anuar 14'; Saari 40'	Stadium: Suez Canal Stadium

04 March 2026 Preliminary round	Austria	2–4	Pakistan	Ismailia, Egypt
16:00	Kelner 47'; Scholz 53'	Report	Afraz 4'; Mahmood 44', 52'; Khan 51'	Stadium: Suez Canal Stadium

06 March 2026 Semi Final	Pakistan	4–3	Japan	Ismailia, Egypt
15:30	Ammad 9'; Mahmood 52'; Khan 55'; Afraz 57'	Report	Ooka 21'; Yamada 35'; Yamasaki 41'	Stadium: Suez Canal Stadium

07 March 2026 Final	England	4–1	Pakistan	Ismailia, Egypt
20:00	Croft 18'; Hooper 35', 40'; Fox 52'	Report	Wal. Rana 42'	Stadium: Suez Canal Stadium

2025–26 Men's FIH Pro League

13 June 2026 2025–26 Men's FIH Pro League	Belgium	7–1	Pakistan	Wavre, Belgium
18:30	Onana 3'; Stockbroekx 38'; Hendrickx 42'; Biekens 50', 55'; Hellin 51'; Boon 55'	Report	Rana 33'	Stadium: Stade Justin Peeters

14 June 2026 2025–26 Men's FIH Pro League	Pakistan	1–5	Spain	Wavre, Belgium
18:30	Mahmood 43'	Report	Álvarez 11', 52'; Cunill 23', 30'; Reyne 48'	Stadium: Stade Justin Peeters

19 June 2026 2025–26 Men's FIH Pro League	Belgium	6–0	Pakistan	Wavre, Belgium
00:00	de Kerpel 1'; Boon 17', 23', 46'; Foubert 41'; Labouchere 50'	Report		Stadium: Stade Justin Peeters

20 June 2026 2025–26 Men's FIH Pro League	Spain	4–2	Pakistan	Wavre, Belgium
18:30	Cunill 29'; Alonso 35'; Álvarez 43', 51'	Report	Mahmood 28', 44'	Stadium: Stade Justin Peeters

23 June 2026 2025–26 Men's FIH Pro League	Pakistan	3–4	India	London, United Kingdom
18:30	Nadeem 8'; Mahmood 53'; Shakeel 60+'	Report	Abhishek 22'; Nilakanta 24'; Sukhjeet 40'; Rajinder 52'	Stadium: Lee Valley Hockey and Tennis Centre

24 June 2026 2025–26 Men's FIH Pro League	England	2–1	Pakistan	London, United Kingdom
17:30	Roper 40'; Hooper 46'	Report	Rana 27'	Stadium: Lee Valley Hockey and Tennis Centre

26 June 2026 2025–26 Men's FIH Pro League	India	7–1	Pakistan	London, United Kingdom
22:00	Sukhjeet 20'; Harmanpreet 26'; Hardik 34'; Jugraj 35'; Abhishek 41'; Pal 44'; Dilpreet 54'	Report	Mahmood 13'	Stadium: Lee Valley Hockey and Tennis Centre

27 June 2026 2025–26 Men's FIH Pro League	England	7–0	Pakistan	London, United Kingdom
20:00	Ward 9'; Bandurak 15', 48'; Taylor 22'; Hooper 38'; Wallace 49'; Croft 52'	Report		Stadium: Lee Valley Hockey and Tennis Centre

Test matches

30 July 2026 Test 1	Pakistan	3–1	South Korea	Islamabad, Pakistan
17:15	Khan 21', 37'; Mahmood 30'	Report	Yang 26'	Stadium: Naseer Bunda Hockey Stadium

1 August 2026 Test 2	Pakistan	3–1	South Korea	Islamabad, Pakistan
17:15	Butt 33'; Mahmood 52', 60'	Report	Son 30'	Stadium: Naseer Bunda Hockey Stadium

2026 Men's FIH Hockey World Cup

15 August 2026 Pool D	England	4–1	Pakistan	Amstelveen, Netherlands
23:00	Rushmere 12'; Ward 28'; Hooper 31'; Albery 47'	Report	Afraz 50'	Stadium: Wagener Stadium

17 August 2026 Pool D	Pakistan	3–3	Wales	Amstelveen, Netherlands
16:30	Abdul 3'; Khan 49'; Shahid 51'	Report	Furlong 25', 53'; Bradshaw 26'	Stadium: Wagener Stadium

19 August 2026 Pool D	Pakistan	3–5	India	Amstelveen, Netherlands
18:00	Shahid 22', 46'; Khan 24'	Report	Harmanpreet 5', 21'; Abhishek 11', 24'; Hardik 35'	Stadium: Wagener Stadium

22 August 2026 Pool G	Pakistan	4–3	Japan	Amstelveen, Netherlands
16:00	Rana 22', 32'; Hammadudin 33'; Shahid 41'	Report	H. Yamada 7'; Tanaka 15'; Yamasaki 36'	Stadium: Wagener Stadium

24 August 2026 Pool G	New Zealand	4–2	Pakistan	Amstelveen, Netherlands
15:30	Thomas 1'; Boyde 16'; Baker 22'; Russell 49'	Report	Khan 33'; Afraz 38'	Stadium: Wagener Stadium

28 August 2026 11th place match	Pakistan	4–4 (4–3 p)	South Africa	Amstelveen, Netherlands
15:30	Afraz 21'; Ammad 22'; Rana 32'; Hammadudin 60'	Report	de Lora 8'; D. Cassiem 18'; M. Cassiem 40', 55'	Stadium: Wagener Stadium
	Penalties
	Hayat (penalty shoot-out scored); Mustafa (penalty shoot-out scored); Shahid (penalty shoot-out scored); Rana (penalty shoot-out missed); Butt (penalty shoot-out scored)		(penalty shoot-out scored) D. Cassiem; (penalty shoot-out scored) Davis; (penalty shoot-out missed) Neethling; (penalty shoot-out missed) Seale; (penalty shoot-out scored) M. Cassiem

2026 Asian Games

20 September 2026 Pool B	Pakistan	9–0	Thailand	Kakamigahara, Japan
15:00	Shakeel 8'; Butt 12'; Nadeem 20', 37', 43'; Khan 22', 23'; Rana 31'; Shahid 34'	Report		Stadium: Gifu Prefectural Green Stadium

22 September 2026 Pool B	Pakistan	5–1	Uzbekistan	Kakamigahara, Japan
05:00	Ammad 18'; Khan 33', 57'; Rehman 40'; Mahmood 45'	Report	Salimjonov 30+'	Stadium: Gifu Prefectural Green Stadium

25 September 2026 Pool B	China	0–3	Pakistan	Kakamigahara, Japan
15:00		Report	Mahmood 19'; Khan 24'; Shahid 28'	Stadium: Gifu Prefectural Green Stadium

26 September 2026 Pool B	Malaysia	5–4	Pakistan	Kakamigahara, Japan
09:00	Silverius 5', 56'; Fa. Saari 23'; Fi. Saari 45'; Azrai 57'	Report	Khan 3', 39', 43', 46'	Stadium: Gifu Prefectural Green Stadium

28 September 2026 Pool B	Pakistan	7–2	Oman	Kakamigahara, Japan
11:00	Khan 22', 28'; Rana 34', 44', 59'; Ali 40'; Ammad 46'	Report	Al-Nofli 28'; Madit 36'	Stadium: Gifu Prefectural Green Stadium

1 October 2026 Semi-final	India	4–3	Pakistan	Kakamigahara, Japan
12:30	Harmanpreet 5', 13'; Sukhjeet 23'; Abhishek 60'	Report	Mahmood 30'; Shahid 45'; Rana 49'	Stadium: Gifu Prefectural Green Stadium

3 October 2026 Bronze medal match	Pakistan	5–3	South Korea	Kakamigahara, Japan
12:30	Khan 4'; Abdul 30'; Rana 52', 54'; Shahid 59'	Report	Lee G. 12'; Kim Y. 18'; Yang 25'	Stadium: Gifu Prefectural Green Stadium

== Head-to-head record ==
Record last updated as of the following matches:

Pakistan vs South Korea at Kawasaki Juko Stadium, Kakamigahara in the 2026 Asian Games, 3 October 2026

Won more matches than lost
Won equal matches to lost
Lost more matches than won

Opponent	GP	W	D	L	GF	GA	Win %	Last meeting
Argentina	36	21	3	12	111	66	58.33%	2025
Australia	125	43	19	63	258	342	34.4%	2026
Austria	1	1	0	0	4	2	100%	2026
Bangladesh	16	16	0	0	139	12	100%	2025
Belarus	2	2	0	0	8	0	100%	2000
Belgium	40	24	4	12	96	75	60%	2026
Canada	32	24	4	4	103	57	75%	2024
China	39	32	2	5	162	46	82.05%	2026
Chinese Taipei	2	2	0	0	22	0	100%	2013
Cuba	2	0	1	1	2	3	0%	1993
Denmark	1	1	0	0	9	0	100%	1948
East Germany	3	0	0	3	2	6	0%	1968
Egypt	11	11	0	0	57	6	100%	2022
England	40	15	8	17	84	96	37.50%	2026
France	27	19	5	3	114	35	70.37%	2025
Germany	128	47	18	63	251	296	36.72%	2026
Great Britain	50	27	7	16	124	87	54%	2024
Hong Kong	47	47	0	0	162	2	100%	2010
India	185	82	32	71	413	399	44.32%	2026
Indonesia	1	1	0	0	13	0	100%	2022
Iran	2	2	0	0	29	0	100%	1985
Ireland	16	10	2	4	46	21	62.5%	2022
Italy	4	4	0	0	20	0	100%	2009
Japan	69	47	13	9	240	84	68.12%	2026
Kazakhstan	2	2	0	0	19	1	100%	2018
Kenya	52	33	12	7	126	37	63.46%	1998
Malaysia	117	83	23	11	324	154	70.94%	2026
Nepal	2	2	0	0	41	0	100%	2010
Netherlands	148	60	30	58	316	355	40.54%	2025
New Zealand	61	37	8	16	190	122	60.66%	2026
Nigeria	2	2	0	0	16	3	100%	2003
Oman	11	10	1	0	81	12	90.90%	2026
Poland	13	10	2	1	41	16	76.92%	2015
Rhodesia	1	1	0	0	6	0	100%	1968
Russia	1	1	0	0	5	0	100%	2009
Scotland	6	5	1	0	20	6	83.33%	2022
Singapore	14	14	0	0	87	7	100%	2023
South Africa	19	11	3	5	71	43	57.89%	2026
South Korea	79	43	14	22	238	146	54.43%	2026
Soviet Union	17	14	1	2	59	20	82.35%	1992
Spain	74	42	17	15	182	116	56.76%	2026
Sri Lanka	11	11	0	0	103	2	100%	2016
Switzerland	6	5	1	0	29	14	83.33%	2000
Tanzania	1	1	0	0	3	1	100%	1965
Thailand	7	6	1	0	69	0	85.71%	2026
Trinidad and Tobago	1	1	0	0	7	1	100%	2007
Uganda	2	2	0	0	5	2	100%	1972
Ukraine	1	1	0	0	5	0	100%	2007
United States	3	3	0	0	13	1	100%	1996
Uzbekistan	2	2	0	0	23	3	100%	2026
Wales	6	4	2	0	20	6	66.66%	2026
Zimbabwe	9	9	0	0	47	4	100%	1988
Total	1537	883	234	420	4615	2707	57.45%	2026

== Decline ==
The Pakistan men's national field hockey team was once one of the most successful teams in international hockey, winning three Olympic gold medals (1960, 1968, 1984) and four World Cups (1971, 1978, 1982, 1994). However, the team experienced a significant decline in the 21st century. Factors contributing to the decline included poor administration, financial difficulties, inadequate training facilities, inconsistent selection policies, and weak grassroots development. As a result, Pakistan struggled to maintain its position among the world's leading hockey nations. The team failed to qualify for the last three consecutive Olympic Games 2016 Rio, 2020 Tokyo and 2024 Paris having last appeared at the Olympics in 2012. Similarly, Pakistan failed to qualify for the 2014 and 2023 World Cups, and finished a poor 12th among 16 teams in the 2018 edition. In the 2010 World Cup, they finished last among 12 participants. The team's last major international title was the gold medal at the 2010 Asian Games, and their last Olympic medal was a bronze at the 1992 Barcelona Games.

== See also ==
- National Hockey Championship
- India–Pakistan field hockey rivalry
- Netherlands–Pakistan field hockey record
- Pakistan women's national field hockey team
- Pakistan men's national under-21 field hockey team
