= Bradley Read =

New Zealand field hockey player

Personal information
- Full name: Bradley Kelvin Read
- Born: 4 February 1995 (age 31) Christchurch, New Zealand
- Height: 185 cm (6 ft 1 in)

Sport
- Sport: Field hockey
- Position: Defence
Senior career
Years	Team	Caps	Goals
2014–2019	Capital	-	-
2020–2020	Central Falcons	-	-
2021–2022	Wellington	-	-
2023–2025	Holcombe	-	-
National team
Years	Team	Caps	Goals
2014–2016	New Zealand U–21	15	(2)
2016–	New Zealand	62	(1)
Medal record
Men's field hockey
Representing New Zealand
Oceania Cup
Silver medal – second place	2017 Sydney
Silver medal – second place	2025 Darwin
FIH Nations Cup
Gold medal – first place	2023–24 Gniezno
Sultan Azlan Shah Cup
Bronze medal – third place	2024 Ipoh

Bradley 'Brad' Kelvin Read (born 4 February 1995) is a field hockey player from New Zealand.

== Life ==
Bradley Read was born in Christchurch, and grew up in Wellington, New Zealand.

== Career ==
=== Domestic league ===
In domestic competition, Read is currently not attached to a club. He most recently competed with Holcombe in the English Hockey League and Euro Hockey League. He previously competed on home soil for the Central Falcons in the Premier Hockey League and his home city of Wellington in the Ford National Hockey Championship.

=== Under–21 ===
He represented the New Zealand U–21 team from 2014 until 2016. He was a member of the squad at the 2014 and 2016 editions of the Sultan of Johor Cup in Johor Bahru, before captaining the team at the 2016 FIH Junior World Cup in Lucknow.

=== Black Sticks ===
Read made his senior international debut for the Black Sticks in 2016. He earned his first senior cap during a match against Australia during the Trans–Tasman Trophy in Auckland.

Since his debut, Read has been a constant fixture in the national squad. He has represented Team New Zealand in major competitions including the XXII Commonwealth Games in Birmingham and the XXXIII Olympic Games in Paris. He has also medalled with the national squad on three occasions. He won silver at the 2017 Oceania Cup in Sydney, bronze at the 2024 Sultan Azlan Shah Cup in Ipoh, and gold at the 2023–24 FIH Nations Cup in Gniezno.

He has most recently been named in the squad for the 2025 Oceania Cup in Darwin.
