= 2024 Sultan Azlan Shah Cup =

Malaysian men's field hockey tournament

Tournament details
- Host country: Malaysia
- City: Ipoh
- Dates: 4–11 May
- Teams: 6 (from 3 confederations)
- Venue: Azlan Shah Stadium

Final positions
- Champions: Japan (1st title)
- Runner-up: Pakistan
- Third place: New Zealand

Tournament statistics
- Matches played: 18
- Goals scored: 88 (4.89 per match)
- Top scorer: (Malaysia) Abu Kamal Azrai (8 goals)

The 2024 Sultan Azlan Shah Cup was the 30th edition of the Sultan Azlan Shah Cup, the annual men's invitational international field hockey tournament hosted by Malaysia. The tournament returned after a one-year hiatus after it was postponed in 2023 due to the packed calendar. It was held at the Azlan Shah Stadium in Ipoh, Malaysia from 4 to 11 May 2024. The tournament consisted of six teams.

The hosts Malaysia were the defending champions after winning their first title at the 2022 edition. They were not able to defend their title as they did not qualify for the final. The final was played between Japan and Pakistan, where Japan beat Pakistan 3–1 in the shoot-out following a 2–2 draw in regulation time. It was the first Sultan Azlan Shah Cup title for Japan. New Zealand won the bronze medal after defeating Malaysia 3–2.

== Teams ==
The following six teams participated in the tournament:

| Team | Appearance | Last appearance | Previous best performance |
|---|---|---|---|
| Canada | 10th | 2019 | 4th (1995, 1999, 2019) |
| Japan | 6th | 2022 | 4th (2022) |
| Malaysia | 30th | 2022 | 1st (2022) |
| New Zealand | 18th | 2017 | 1st (2012, 2015) |
| Pakistan | 22nd | 2022 | 1st (1999, 2000, 2003) |
| South Korea | 22nd | 2022 | 1st (1996, 2010, 2019) |

== Preliminary round ==
=== Standings ===
| Pos | Team | Pld | W | D | L | GF | GA | GD | Pts | Qualification |
|---|---|---|---|---|---|---|---|---|---|---|
| 1 | Japan | 5 | 4 | 1 | 0 | 12 | 5 | +7 | 13 | Final |
| 2 | Pakistan | 5 | 3 | 2 | 0 | 16 | 10 | +6 | 11 | Final |
| 3 | Malaysia (H) | 5 | 3 | 0 | 2 | 18 | 13 | +5 | 9 | Third place match |
| 4 | New Zealand | 5 | 2 | 1 | 2 | 17 | 13 | +4 | 7 | Third place match |
| 5 | South Korea | 5 | 1 | 0 | 4 | 3 | 11 | −8 | 3 | Fifth place match |
| 6 | Canada | 5 | 0 | 0 | 5 | 8 | 22 | −14 | 0 | Fifth place match |

Source: FIH
Rules for classification: 1) points; 2) matches won; 3) goal difference; 4) goals for; 5) head-to-head result; 6) field goals for.
(H) Hosts

=== Results ===
4 May 2024
16:00

| New Zealand | 7–1 | Canada |
|---|---|---|
| Boyde 1', 60'; Baker 16', 42', 59'; Smith 26', 45' | Report | Childs 47' |

Umpires:
Hideki Kinoshita (JPN)
Yaser Khurshid (PAK)

4 May 2024
18:15

| South Korea | 1–2 | Japan |
|---|---|---|
| Lim 52' | Report | T. Tanaka 13'; Yamada 20' |

Umpires:
Sourabh Rajput (IND)
Azhar Abiddin Nor (MAS)

4 May 2024
20:30

| Malaysia | 4–5 | Pakistan |
|---|---|---|
| Abu 13', 28', 45'; Shello 59' | Report | S. Khan 9', 50', 59'; Hayat 53'; Mahmood 60' |

Umpires:
Alex Miles (CAN)
Deepak Joshi (IND)

5 May 2024
16:00

| New Zealand | 1–4 | Japan |
|---|---|---|
| Cosslett 55' | Report | Kimura 13'; Fujishima 23'; T. Tanaka 43'; Nagayoshi 60' |

Umpires:
Kim Ji-yong (KOR)
Deepak Joshi (IND)

5 May 2024
18:15

| South Korea | 0–4 | Pakistan |
|---|---|---|
| | Report | Shahid 3'; Liaqat 20'; Ali 27'; S. Khan 60' |

Umpires:
Ahmad Berhaumidin (MAS)
Benjamin Grant (NZL)

5 May 2024
20:30

| Canada | 2–6 | Malaysia |
|---|---|---|
| Noronha-Teixeira 12', 42' | Report | Fitri 13'; Abu 14'; Azimuddin 19'; Aiman 31'; Syed 48'; Faizal 49' |

Umpires:
Salim Lucky (BAN)
Hideki Kinoshita (JPN)

7 May 2024
16:00

| Canada | 0–1 | South Korea |
|---|---|---|
| | Report | Oh 13' |

Umpires:
Azhar Abiddin Nor (MAS)
Salim Lucky (BAN)

7 May 2024
18:15

| Pakistan | 1–1 | Japan |
|---|---|---|
| Rana 59' | Report | Nagayoshi 33' |

Umpires:
Benjamin Grant (NZL)
Sourabh Rajput (IND)

7 May 2024
20:30

| Malaysia | 6–4 | New Zealand |
|---|---|---|
| Faizal 2'; Abu 5', 14', 60'; Azimuddin 6'; Muhajir 52' | Report | Smith 19'; Elmes 28'; Houlbrooke 58', 60' |

Umpires:
Yaser Khurshid (PAK)
Alex Miles (CAN)

8 May 2024
16:00

| Pakistan | 5–4 | Canada |
|---|---|---|
| Mahmood 28', 29'; Liaqat 36'; Rana 44'; Ali 45' | Report | Davis 5', 45'; H. Sidhu 17'; Buttar 50' |

Umpires:
Ahmad Berhaumidin (MAS)
Kim Ji-yong (KOR)

8 May 2024
18:15

| South Korea | 1–4 | New Zealand |
|---|---|---|
| Sim 39' | Report | Baker 4'; Elmes 18'; Smith 23'; Houlbrooke 53' |

Umpires:
Salim Lucky (BAN)
Sourabh Rajput (IND)

8 May 2024
20:30

| Japan | 2–1 | Malaysia |
|---|---|---|
| Matsumoto 24'; Ooka 50' | Report | Faizal 31' |

Umpires:
Yaser Khurshid (PAK)
Deepak Joshi (IND)

10 May 2024
16:00

| New Zealand | 1–1 | Pakistan |
|---|---|---|
| Holmes 35' | Report | Mahmood 43' |

Umpires:
Kim Jiyong (KOR)
Kinoshita hideki (JPN)

10 May 2024
18:15

| Japan | 3–1 | Canada |
|---|---|---|
| Saito 43'; T. Tanaka 56'; Kawabe 60' | Report | Davis 42' |

Umpires:
Berhaumidin Ahmed (MAS)
Abiddin Nor Azhar (MAS)

10 May 2024
20:30

| Malaysia | 1–0 | South Korea |
|---|---|---|
| Akhimullah 7' | Report |

Umpires:
Burki Khan (PAK)
Kassim Faisal (MAS)

== Classification round ==
=== Fifth and sixth place ===
11 May 2024
16:00

| South Korea | 4–1 | Canada |
|---|---|---|
| Kong 15'; Lim 16'; Seo 17'; Jung 24' | Report | Sidhu 50' |

Umpires:
Salim Lucky (BAN)
Ben Grant (NZL)

=== Third and fourth place ===
11 May 2024
18:15

| Malaysia | 2–3 | New Zealand |
|---|---|---|
| Azrai 3'; Fitri 60' | Report | Cosslett 5'; Elmes 10'; Lett 48' |

Umpires:
Hideki Kinoshita (JPN)
Yaser Khurshid (PAK)

=== Final ===
11 May 2024
20:30

| Japan | 2–2 | Pakistan |
|---|---|---|
| S. Tanaka 12'; Matsumoto 47' | Report | Ahmad 34'; Rehman 37' |
Penalties
| Kawabe (penalty shoot-out scored); Ooka (penalty shoot-out scored); S. Tanaka (penalty shoot-out scored); Matsumoto (penalty shoot-out scored) | 4–1 | (penalty shoot-out missed) Rana; (penalty shoot-out missed) Liaqat; (penalty shoot-out scored) Butt |

Umpires:
Deepak Joshi (IND)
Sourabh Rajput (IND)

== Statistics ==
=== Final standing ===
| Pos | Team |
|---|---|
| 1st place, gold medalist(s) | Japan |
| 2nd place, silver medalist(s) | Pakistan |
| 3rd place, bronze medalist(s) | New Zealand |
| 4 | Malaysia (H) |
| 5 | South Korea |
| 6 | Canada |

Source: FIH
(H) Host

=== Goalscorers ===
There were 88 goals scored in 18 matches, for an average of 4.89 goals per match.

8 goals

- (Malaysia) Abu Kamal Azrai

4 goals

- (New Zealand) George Baker
- (New Zealand) Jake Smith
- (Pakistan) Sufyan Khan
- (Pakistan) Abu Mahmood

3 goals

- (Canada) Sean Davis
- (Japan) Tsubasa Tanaka
- (Malaysia) Faizal Saari
- (New Zealand) Jonty Elmes
- (New Zealand) Isaac Houlbrooke

2 goals

- (Canada) Devohn Noronha-Teixeira
- (Canada) Harbir Sidhu
- (Japan) Kazumasa Matsumoto
- (Japan) Ken Nagayoshi
- (Malaysia) Azimuddin Kamaruddin
- (Malaysia) Fitri Saari
- (New Zealand) Scott Boyde
- (New Zealand) Scott Cosslett
- (Pakistan) Ghazanfar Ali
- (Pakistan) Arshad Liaqat
- (Pakistan) Waheed Rana
- (South Korea) Lim Do-hyun

1 goal

- (Canada) Avjot Buttar
- (Canada) Rowan Childs
- (Japan) Raiki Fujishima
- (Japan) Kosei Kawabe
- (Japan) Naru Kimura
- (Japan) Ryoma Ooka
- (Japan) Hiro Saito
- (Japan) Seren Tanaka
- (Japan) Shota Yamada
- (Malaysia) Akhimullah Anuar
- (Malaysia) Syed Cholan
- (Malaysia) Muhajir Abdu Rauf
- (Malaysia) Aiman Rozemi
- (Malaysia) Shello Silverius
- (New Zealand) Luke Holmes
- (New Zealand) Dane Lett
- (Pakistan) Rehman Abdul
- (Pakistan) Ajaz Ahmad
- (Pakistan) Zikriya Hayat
- (Pakistan) Hannan Shahid
- (South Korea) Jung Hyun-ho
- (South Korea) Kong Yoon-ho
- (South Korea) Oh Se-yong
- (South Korea) Seo In-woo
- (South Korea) Sim Jae-won

Source: FIH
