= Scott Cosslett =

New Zealand field hockey player

Personal information
- Born: 19 February 2003 (age 23) Auckland, New Zealand

Sport
- Sport: Field hockey
- Position: Defence
Senior career
Years	Team	Caps	Goals
–	North Harbour	-	-
National team
Years	Team	Caps	Goals
2022–2023	New Zealand U–21	14	(3)
2023–	New Zealand	6	(2)
Medal record
Men's field hockey
Representing New Zealand
Sultan Azlan Shah Cup
Bronze medal – third place	2024 Ipoh	Team
Junior Oceania Cup
Silver medal – second place	2022 Canberra	Team

Scott Cosslett (born 19 February 2003) is a field hockey player from New Zealand.

== Early life ==
Cosslett grew up in Auckland, New Zealand. He is an alumnus of Westlake Boys' High School.

== Career ==
=== Under–21 ===
Cosslett made his international debut at under–21 level. He represented the New Zealand U–21 team at the 2022 Junior Oceania Cup in Canberra, where he won a silver medal.

He followed this up in 2023 with appearances at the Sultan of Johor Cup in Johor Bahru, and the FIH Junior World Cup in Kuala Lumpur.

=== Domestic league ===
In the Ford National Hockey Championship, Cosslett represents North Harbour.

=== Black Sticks ===
Cosslett received his first call-up to the national Black Sticks in 2024. He made his international debut during the Sultan Azlan Shah Cup in Ipoh, where he also won a bronze medal. He was later named in the squad for the 2023–24 FIH Nations Cup in Gniezno.

==== International goals ====
Goal	Date	Location	Opponent	Score	Result	Competition	Ref.
1	5 May 2024	Azlan Shah Stadium, Ipoh, Malaysia	Japan	1–3	1–4	2024 Sultan Azlan Shah Cup	
2	11 May 2024	Azlan Shah Stadium, Ipoh, Malaysia	Malaysia	1–1	3–2	2024 Sultan Azlan Shah Cup	
