= Oh Se-yong =

South Korean field hockey player (born 1996)

Personal information
- Born: 24 April 1996 (age 30) South Korea

Sport
- Sport: Field hockey
- Position: Forward
- Club: Gimhae City Hall
National team
Years	Team	Caps	Goals
2016–2016	South Korea U–21	5	(2)
2024–	South Korea	26	(5)
Medal record
Men's field hockey
Representing South Korea
Asian Cup
Silver medal – second place	2025 Rajgir

Oh Se-yong (Korean: 오세용, born 24 April 1996) is a field hockey player from South Korea, who plays as a forward.

== Career ==
=== Under–21 ===
In 2016, Oh made his debut for the South Korean U–21 team. He was a member of the side at the FIH Junior World Cup in Lucknow.

=== Senior national team ===
Oh made his senior international debut for South Korea in 2024. He earned his first senior international cap at the Sultan Azlan Shah Cup in Ipoh. Later that year he represented the national team at the 2023–24 FIH Nations Cup in Gniezno, as well as the Asian Champions Trophy in Hulunbuir.

In 2025, Oh won his first medal with the national team. He was a member of the squad that won silver at the 2025 Asian Cup in Rajgir.

=== International goals ===
Goal	Date	Location	Opponent	Score	Result	Competition	Ref.
1	7 May 2024	Azlan Shah Stadium, Ipoh, Malaysia	Canada	1–0	1–0	2024 Sultan Azlan Shah Cup	
2	3 June 2024	Stadion Miejski im. Alfonsa Flinika, Gniezno, Poland	Austria	3–0	5–1	2023–24 FIH Nations Cup	
3	29 August 2025	Bihar Sports University Hockey Stadium, Rajgir, India	Chinese Taipei	5–0	7–0	2025 Asian Cup	
4	1 September 2025	Bihar Sports University Hockey Stadium, Rajgir, India	Bangladesh	4–0	5–1	2025 Asian Cup	
5	6 September 2025	Bihar Sports University Hockey Stadium, Rajgir, India	Malaysia	2–3	4–3	2025 Asian Cup	
