= Jonty Elmes =

New Zealand field hockey player

Personal information
- Born: 10 November 2004 (age 21) Napier, New Zealand

Sport
- Sport: Field hockey
- Position: Forward
Senior career
Years	Team	Caps	Goals
2023–	North Harbour	-	-
National team
Years	Team	Caps	Goals
2023–	New Zealand U–21	11	(3)
2024–	New Zealand	12	(7)
Medal record
Men's field hockey
Representing New Zealand
Oceania Cup
Silver medal – second place	2025 Darwin
FIH Nations Cup
Gold medal – first place	2023–24 Gniezno
Gold medal – first place	2024–25 Kuala Lumpur
Sultan Azlan Shah Cup
Bronze medal – third place	2024 Ipoh

Jonty Elmes is a field hockey player from New Zealand.

== Early life ==
Jonty Elmes was born in Napier, New Zealand, on 10 November 2004. His older brother, Luke, has also represented New Zealand in field hockey.

== Field hockey ==
=== Domestic league ===
In the Ford National Hockey Championship, Elmes represents North Harbour.

=== Under–21 ===
Elmes made his international debut at under–21 level. He was a member of the New Zealand U–21 squad at the 2023 Sultan of Johor Cup in Johor Bahru. Later in the year he represented the team again at the FIH Junior World Cup in Kuala Lumpur.

=== Black Sticks ===
In 2024, Elmes received his first called into the Black Sticks squad. He made his debut that year during the Sultan Azlan Shah Cup in Ipoh, where he won a bronze medal. He was again named in the squad for the 2023–24 FIH Nations Cup in Gniezno.

==== International goals ====
Goal	Date	Location	Opponent	Score	Result	Competition	Ref.
1	7 May 2024	Azlan Shah Stadium, Ipoh, Malaysia	Malaysia	2–4	4–6	2024 Sultan Azlan Shah Cup	
2	8 May 2024	Azlan Shah Stadium, Ipoh, Malaysia	South Korea	2–0	4–1	2024 Sultan Azlan Shah Cup	
3	11 May 2024	Azlan Shah Stadium, Ipoh, Malaysia	Malaysia	2–1	3–2	2024 Sultan Azlan Shah Cup	
4	31 May 2024	Stadion Miejski im. Alfonsa Flinika, Gniezno, Poland	Poland	3–2	4–2	2023–24 FIH Nations Cup	
5	1 June 2024	Stadion Miejski im. Alfonsa Flinika, Gniezno, Poland	Austria	1–0	3–0	2023–24 FIH Nations Cup	
6	1 June 2024	Stadion Miejski im. Alfonsa Flinika, Gniezno, Poland	Austria	2–0	3–0	2023–24 FIH Nations Cup	
7	9 June 2024	Stadion Miejski im. Alfonsa Flinika, Gniezno, Poland	France	1–0	1–1	2023–24 FIH Nations Cup	
