= Isaac Houlbrooke =

New Zealand field hockey player

Personal information
- Full name: Isaac Lancelot Houlbrooke
- Born: 6 September 2001 (age 24) Auckland, New Zealand

Sport
- Sport: Field hockey
- Position: Forward
Senior career
Years	Team	Caps	Goals
–	North Harbour	-	-
National team
Years	Team	Caps	Goals
2022	New Zealand U–21	3	(1)
2023–	New Zealand	34	(5)
2023–	New Zealand Indoor	17	(16)
Medal record
Men's field hockey
Representing New Zealand
Oceania Cup
Silver medal – second place	2025 Darwin	Team
FIH Olympic Qualifiers
Bronze medal – third place	2024 Muscat	Team
Junior Oceania Cup
Silver medal – second place	2022 Canberra	Team

Isaac Lancelot Houlbrooke (born 6 September 2001) is a field hockey player from New Zealand.

== Life ==
Isaac Houlbrooke grew up in North Shore, New Zealand.

Houlbrooke is an alumnus of Rosmini College.

== Career ==
=== Domestic league ===
In the Ford National Hockey Championship, Houlbrooke represents North Harbour.

=== Under–21 ===
Houlbrooke made his international debut at under–21 level. He represented the New Zealand U–21 team at the 2022 Junior Oceania Cup in Canberra, where he won a silver medal.

=== Black Sticks ===
Houlbrooke received his first call-up to the Black Sticks in 2023. He made his international debut during season four of the FIH Pro League.

In 2024, Houlbrooke was a member of the bronze medal-winning squad at the FIH Olympic Qualifier in Muscat, which earned the squad Olympic qualification. He has since been named in the squad for the Sultan Azlan Shah Cup in Ipoh.

==== International goals ====
Goal	Date	Location	Opponent	Score	Result	Competition	Ref.
1	18 January 2024	Hockey Oman, Muscat, Oman	Canada	2–0	4–0	2024 FIH Olympic Qualifiers	
