= Roelant Oltmans =

Dutch field hockey coach

Personal information
- Full name: Roelant Wouter Oltmans
- Born: 25 May 1954 (age 72) Oegstgeest, Netherlands

Sport
- Sport: Field hockey
- Club: Pakistan U21 (head coach)
Coaching career
- Years: Team
- 1989–1993: Netherlands (women)
- 1993–1998: Netherlands
- –: Klein Zwitserland
- 2003–2004: Pakistan
- 2005–2008: Netherlands
- 2015–2017: India
- 2018: Pakistan
- 2018–2020: Malaysia
- 2020–2022: Kampong
- 2023–: Pakistan U21
- 2024–: Pakistan
- 2025–: China (assistant)

Roelant Wouter Oltmans (born 25 May 1954) is a Dutch field hockey coach, who is the current head coach of the Pakistan national field hockey team. Earlier he coached the Larensche Mixed Hockey Club men's team. He coached the Netherlands men's, India men's, Pakistan men's, Netherlands women's teams and Malaysia men's team . He also served as the head coach of the Kampong first men's team.

== Career ==
His first major prize was with the Netherlands women's team. He was coach from 1989 to 1993 and was world champion at the 1990 Women's Hockey World Cup in Sydney. In 1993 he moved to the men's team, he won the gold medal at the 1996 Summer Olympics after defeating Spain 3–1 in the final.

In 1998 he became world champion with the Netherlands men's team at the 1998 Men's Hockey World Cup in Utrecht. Then Oltmans moved to football. Until 2002, Oltmans served as technical director of football for NAC. Oltmans was appointed coach of the national team of Pakistan during the Olympic Games in Athens and held the position until the end of 2004. In 2005, he returned as coach of the Dutch national men's team. He held this position until the 2008 Summer Olympics. He was the head coach of the Malaysia men's national hockey team until July 2020 when he resigned. He then was hired as the new head coach of Kampong first men's team.
