= 2023–24 Men's FIH Hockey Nations Cup =

Men's field hockey tournament held in Poland

Tournament details
- Host country: Poland
- City: Gniezno
- Dates: 31 May – 9 June 2024
- Teams: 9 (from 5 confederations)

Final positions
- Champions: New Zealand (1st title)
- Runner-up: France
- Third place: South Africa

Tournament statistics
- Matches played: 24
- Goals scored: 118 (4.92 per match)
- Top scorer(s): (France) Victor Charlet (Malaysia) Faizal Saari (7 goals)
- Best player: (New Zealand) Nic Woods
- Best young player: (Pakistan) Hannan Shahid
- Best goalkeeper: (France) Arthur Thieffry

The 2023–24 Men's FIH Hockey Nations Cup was the second edition of the Men's FIH Hockey Nations Cup, the annual qualification tournament for the Men's FIH Pro League organised by the International Hockey Federation. The tournament was held from 31 May to 9 June 2024 at Gniezno, Poland.

New Zealand won the tournament and were promoted to the 2024–25 Men's FIH Pro League. The New Zealand withdrew, 2 October 2024, and were replaced by Ireland.

== Teams ==
The nine highest ranked teams not participating in the Men's FIH Pro League participated in the tournament. The Polish team had not qualified for this FIH Hockey Nations Cup, so the tournament was exceptionally be played with nine teams:

- Austria
- Canada
- France
- Malaysia
- New Zealand
- Pakistan
- Poland
- South Africa
- South Korea

== Preliminary round ==
All times are local (UTC+1).

=== Pool A ===
Pos	Team	Pld	W	D	L	GF	GA	GD	Pts	Qualification
1	New Zealand	4	4	0	0	13	5	+8	12	Semi-finals
2	South Africa	4	2	0	2	8	7	+1	6	Semi-finals
3	Austria	4	2	0	2	7	12	−5	6	
4	South Korea	4	1	0	3	7	8	−1	3	
5	Poland (H)	4	1	0	3	5	8	−3	3	

Source: FIH
Rules for classification: 1) points; 2) matches won; 3) goal difference; 4) goals for; 5) head-to-head result; 6) field goals for.
(H) Hosts

31 May 2024
16:30

South Africa	3–4	Austria
Ntuli 4'; Guise-Brown 6', 33'	Report	Kaiser 7'; Losonci 20'; Scholz 26', 32'

Umpires:
Paul van den Assum (NED)
Michael Dutrieux (BEL)

31 May 2024
19:00

New Zealand	4–2	Poland
Read 9'; Smith 16'; Elmes 38'; Child 53'	Report	Jarzembowski 23'; Koperski 33'

Umpires:
Titus Ngolia (KEN)
Benjamin Peters (USA)

1 June 2024
16:30

New Zealand	3–0	Austria
Elmes 7', 40'; Morrison 41'	Report

Umpires:
Haroon Rashid (PAK)
Federico Silva (ARG)

1 June 2024
19:00

South Korea	0–1	Poland
	Report	Głowacki 24'

Umpires:
Federico Silva (ARG)
Paul van den Assum (NED)

3 June 2024
16:30

South Korea	5–1	Austria
Kim Sung-y. 11'; Park C. 22'; Oh S. 41'; Rim 49'; Kong 50'	Report	Frey 55'

Umpires:
Titus Ngolia (KEN)
Federico Silva (ARG)

3 June 2024
19:00

South Africa	1–2	New Zealand
Guise-Brown 34'	Report	Inglis 11'; Boyde 32'

Umpires:
Harry Collinson (ENG)
Munashe Mashoko (ZIM)

4 June 2024
15:30

New Zealand	4–2	South Korea
Boyde 5'; Russell 23'; Smith 31'; Houlbrooke 46'	Report	Park C. 26', 52'

Umpires:
Michael Dutrieux (BEL)
Haroon Rashid (PAK)

4 June 2024
18:00

Poland	1–2	South Africa
Jarzembowski 46'	Report	Ntuli 17'; Sherwood 55'

Umpires:
Paul van den Assum (NED)
Benjamin Peters (USA)

6 June 2024
15:30

South Africa	2–0	South Korea
Horne 38'; Julius 41'	Report

Umpires:
Federico Silva (ARG)
Michael Dutrieux (BEL)

6 June 2024
18:00

Austria	2–1	Poland
Losonci 31'; Scholz 35'	Report	Hołosyniuk 20'

Umpires:
Haroon Rashid (PAK)
Harry Collinson (ENG)

=== Pool B ===
Pos	Team	Pld	W	D	L	GF	GA	GD	Pts	Qualification
1	France	3	3	0	0	13	6	+7	9	Semi-finals
2	Pakistan	3	1	1	1	17	11	+6	4	Semi-finals
3	Malaysia	3	1	1	1	9	9	0	4	
4	Canada	3	0	0	3	3	16	−13	0	

Source: FIH
Rules for classification: 1) points; 2) matches won; 3) goal difference; 4) goals for; 5) head-to-head result; 6) field goals scored.

31 May 2024
11:30

Malaysia	4–4	Pakistan
Fitri 4', 42'; Azrai 7'; Faizal 11'	Report	Rehman 32'; Khan 43'; Shahid 52'; Mahmood 60'

Umpires:
Tim Bond (NZL)
Harry Collinson (ENG)

31 May 2024
14:00

France	4–0	Canada
Baumgarten 25'; Curty 48'; Charlet 53'; Rogeau 54'	Report

Umpires:
Federico Silva (ARG)
Erik Etsebeth (RSA)

3 June 2024 (Note: The matches, originally scheduled for 2 June, were postponed to 3 June due to heavy rain.)
11:30

Pakistan	8–1	Canada
Rana 7', 27', 58', 60'; Ali 36', 60'; Rehman 51'; Shahid 53'	Report	Davis 2'

Umpires:
Tim Bond (NZL)
Erik Etsebeth (RSA)

3 June 2024
14:00

France	3–1	Malaysia
Clément 5'; Goyet 43'; Tynevez 60+'	Report	Faizal 28'

Umpires:
Benjamin Peters (USA)
Michael Dutrieux (BEL)

5 June 2024
15:30

Malaysia	4–2	Canada
Fitri 2'; Azrai 6'; Cholan 22'; Abdu Rauf 42'	Report	Dhillon 41'; Sidhu 51'

Umpires:
Titus Ngolia (KEN)
Tim Bond (NZL)

5 June 2024
18:00

Pakistan	5–6	France
Mahmood 26'; Yaqoob 29'; Rana 46'; Rehman 52'; Shahid 56'	Report	Charlet 7', 25', 39', 59'; Rogeau 14'; Baumgarten 23'

Umpires:
Harry Collinson (ENG)
Erik Etsebeth (RSA)

== Fifth to eight place classification ==
=== Bracket ===
Crossover
8 June
Austria	1 (1)
Canada (p.s.o.)	1 (3)
8 June
Malaysia	3
South Korea	4

Fifth place
9 June
Canada	2
South Korea	1
Seventh place
9 June
Austria	4
Malaysia	5

=== Crossover ===
8 June 2024
10:30

Austria	1–1	Canada
Hackl 54'	Report	Loh 38'
Penalties
Unterkircher (penalty shoot-out scored); Losonci (penalty shoot-out missed); Winkler (penalty shoot-out missed); Valas (penalty shoot-out missed)	1–3	(penalty shoot-out missed) Sidhu; (penalty shoot-out scored) Guraliuk; (penalty shoot-out missed) Harris; (penalty shoot-out scored) Dhillon; (penalty shoot-out missed) Sidhu; (penalty shoot-out scored) Loh

Umpires:
Tim Bond (NZL)
Munashe Mashoko (ZIM)

8 June 2024
13:00

Malaysia	3–4	South Korea
Faizal 16', 30'; Azrai 35'	Report	Kim Sung-y. 26'; Seo 28'; Lim D. 38'; Rim 47'

Umpires:
Benjamin Peters (USA)
Erik Etsebeth (RSA)

=== Seventh and eighth place ===
9 June 2024
10:30

Austria	4–5	Malaysia
Losonci 21'; Scholz 34', 51'; Kucera 49'	Report	Azrai 2'; Faizal 18', 32', 33'; Fitri 23'

Umpires:
Munashe Mashoko (ZIM)
Titus Ngolia (KEN)

=== Fifth and sixth place ===
9 June 2024
13:00

Canada	2–1	South Korea
Nicholson 5'; Harris 7'	Report	Park C. 52'

Umpires:
Erik Etsebeth (RSA)
Haroon Rashid (PAK)

== First to fourth place classification ==
=== Bracket ===
Semi-finals
8 June
New Zealand	2
Pakistan	1
8 June
France	2
South Africa	1

Final
9 June
New Zealand (p.s.o.)	1 (4)
France	1 (3)
Third place
9 June
Pakistan	3
South Africa	4

=== Semi-finals ===
8 June 2024
15:30

France	2–1	South Africa
Baumgarten 54'; Charlet 60'	Report	Ntuli 16'

Umpires:
Michael Dutrieux (BEL)
Harry Collinson (ENG)

8 June 2024
18:00

New Zealand	2–1	Pakistan
Russell 2'; Smith 11'	Report	Rana 55'

Umpires:
Paul van den Assum (NED)
Federico Silva (ARG)

=== Third and fourth place ===
9 June 2024
15:30

Pakistan	3–4	South Africa
Mahmood 28'; Rehman 35'; Shahid 59'	Report	Mvimbi 20'; M. Cassiem 34', 58'; Horne 51'

Umpires:
Tim Bond (NZL)
Paul van den Assum (NED)

=== Final ===
9 June 2024
18:00

New Zealand	1–1	France
Elmes 53'	Report	Charlet 57'
Penalties
Findlay (penalty shoot-out scored); Boyde (penalty shoot-out scored); Woods (penalty shoot-out scored); Houlbrooke (penalty shoot-out missed); Russell (penalty shoot-out scored)	4–3	(penalty shoot-out scored) Montecot; (penalty shoot-out missed) Delemazure; (penalty shoot-out missed) Clément; (penalty shoot-out scored) Tynevez; (penalty shoot-out scored) Lockwood

Umpires:
Federico Silva (ARG)
Michael Dutrieux (BEL)

== Statistics ==
=== Final standings ===
Pos	Team	Promotion
1	New Zealand (Note: New Zealand withdrew and were replaced by Ireland to the 2024–25 Men's FIH Pro League.)	2024–25 Men's FIH Pro League
2	France	
3	South Africa	
4	Pakistan	
5	Canada	
6	South Korea	
7	Malaysia	
8	Austria	
9	Poland (H)	

Source: FIH
(H) Host

=== Goalscorers ===
There were 118 goals scored in 24 matches, for an average of 4.92 goals per match.

7 goals

- (France) Victor Charlet
- (Malaysia) Faizal Saari

6 goals

- (Pakistan) Waheed Rana

5 goals

- (Austria) Maximilian Scholz

4 goals

- (Malaysia) Abu Kamal Azrai
- (Malaysia) Fitri Saari
- (New Zealand) Jonty Elmes
- (Pakistan) Hannan Shahid
- (South Korea) Park Cheoleon

3 goals

- (Austria) Fülöp Losonci
- (France) Gaspard Baumgarten
- (New Zealand) Jacob Smith
- (Pakistan) Abu Mahmood
- (Pakistan) Abdul Rehman
- (South Africa) Matthew Guise-Brown
- (South Africa) Nqobile Ntuli

2 goals

- (France) Blaise Rogeau
- (New Zealand) Scott Boyde
- (New Zealand) Kane Russell
- (Pakistan) Ghazanfar Ali
- (Poland) Damian Jarzembowski
- (South Africa) Mustapha Cassiem
- (South Africa) Keenan Horne
- (South Korea) Kim Sung-yeob
- (South Korea) Rim Jin-kang

1 goal

- (Austria) Moritz Frey
- (Austria) Florian Hackl
- (Austria) Julian Kaiser
- (Austria) Arthur Kucera
- (Canada) Sean Davis
- (Canada) Roopkanwar Dhillon
- (Canada) Thomson Harris
- (Canada) Hudson Loh
- (Canada) Jude Nicholson
- (Canada) Maansarovar Sidhu
- (France) Timothée Clément
- (France) Eliot Curty
- (France) François Goyet
- (France) Etienne Tynevez
- (Malaysia) Muhajir Abdu Rauf
- (Malaysia) Syed Cholan
- (New Zealand) Simon Child
- (New Zealand) Isaac Houlbrooke
- (New Zealand) Hugo Inglis
- (New Zealand) Joseph Morrison
- (New Zealand) Bradley Read
- (Pakistan) Abdul Rehman
- (Pakistan) Sufyan Khan
- (Pakistan) Murtaza Yaqoob
- (Poland) Mikołaj Głowacki
- (Poland) Jakub Hołosyniuk
- (Poland) Maksymilian Koperski
- (South Africa) Ryan Julius
- (South Africa) Samkelo Mvimbi
- (South Africa) Bradley Sherwood
- (South Korea) Kong Yoon-ho
- (South Korea) Lim Do-hyun
- (South Korea) Oh Se-yong
- (South Korea) Seo In-woo

Source: FIH

== Awards ==
The awards were announced on 9 June 2024.

Award	Player
Player of the tournament	(New Zealand) Nic Woods
Goalkeeper of the tournament	(France) Arthur Thieffry
Best junior player	(Pakistan) Hannan Shahid

== See also ==
- 2023–24 Women's FIH Hockey Nations Cup
- 2023–24 Men's FIH Pro League
