= Siegfried Aikman =

Dutch field hockey coach

Personal information
- Full name: Siegfried Gottlieb Aikman
- Born: 28 April 1959 (age 67) Netherlands

Sport
- Sport: Field hockey
- Club: Oman (head coach)
Coaching career
- Years: Team
- 2017–2021: Japan
- 2021–2022: Pakistan
- 2023–2024: Oman
- 2025–: Bangladesh
- 2025–: Bangladesh U21

Siegfried Gottlieb Aikman (born 28 April 1959) is a Dutch field hockey coach, who is currently serving as the head coach of the Bangladesh national team and its U21 team.

== Career ==
He managed the Japanese team at the 2020 Summer Olympics. In December 2021, Aikman was named head coach of the Pakistan national hockey team. He also served as the head coach of the Oman national team.
