= Sam Hooper =

English field hockey player (born 1998)

Sam Hopper
Personal information
- Born: 7 August 1998 (age 28) England

Sport
- Sport: Field hockey
- Position: Defender
Senior career
| Years | Team | Caps | Goals |
| 2017–2020 | Exeter Univ | - | - |
| 2020–2021 | Holcombe | - | - |
| 2021–2026 | Wimbledon | - | - |
National team
| Years | Team | Caps | Goals |
| 2024–2025 | England | 14 | (5) |

Samuel Hooper (born 7 August 1998) is an English field hockey player who plays as a defender for the England men's national field hockey team.

== Biography ==
Hooper was educated at Millfield and studied Finance and Investment at the University of Exeter.

Hooper began playing club hockey at Reading Hockey Club and then played for the University of Exeter Hockey Club in the Men's England Hockey League while at university.

After progressing through the England U21 team from 2017 to 2019 and the Great Britain U21 in 2019 and after university, Hooper signed for Holcombe Hockey Club.

Hooper joined Wimbledon Hockey Club for the start of the 2021–22 season and made his full senior England debut on the 10 December 2024, in the Men's FIH Pro League against Argentina.

In 2025, he was added to Great Britain's centralised programme and was part of the England team that was selected for the 2025 Men's EuroHockey Championship in Mönchengladbach, where England finished in sixth place.

In 2025, Hooper was working as a senior analyst at Brown & Brown.
