= George Baker (field hockey) =

New Zealand field hockey player

Personal information
- Born: 24 October 2002 (age 23) Christchurch, New Zealand

Sport
- Sport: Field hockey
- Position: Forward
Senior career
Years	Team	Caps	Goals
–	Canterbury	-	-
National team
Years	Team	Caps	Goals
2022	New Zealand U–21	3	(0)
2023–	New Zealand	16	(3)
Medal record
Men's field hockey
Representing New Zealand
Oceania Cup
Silver medal – second place	2023 Whangārei
Silver medal – second place	2025 Darwin
Junior Oceania Cup
Silver medal – second place	2022 Canberra

George Baker (born 24 October 2002) is a field hockey player from New Zealand.

== Life ==
George Baker grew up in Christchurch, New Zealand.

== Career ==
=== Domestic league ===
In the Ford National Hockey Championship, Baker represents Canterbury.

=== Under–21 ===
Baker made his international debut at under–21 level. He represented the New Zealand U–21 team at the 2022 Junior Oceania Cup in Canberra, where he won a silver medal.

=== Black Sticks ===
Baker received his first call-up to the Black Sticks in 2023. He made his international debut during season four of the FIH Pro League. Following his debut earlier in the year, Baker won a silver medal at the Oceania Cup in Whangārei.

In 2024 Baker was named in the squad for the Sultan Azlan Shah Cup in Ipoh.

==== International goals ====
Goal	Date	Location	Opponent	Score	Result	Competition	Ref.
1	4 May 2024	Azlan Shah Stadium, Ipoh, Malaysia	Canada	2–0	7–1	2024 Sultan Azlan Shah Cup	
2	4 May 2024	Azlan Shah Stadium, Ipoh, Malaysia	Canada	4–0	7–1	2024 Sultan Azlan Shah Cup	
3	4 May 2024	Azlan Shah Stadium, Ipoh, Malaysia	Canada	6–1	7–1	2024 Sultan Azlan Shah Cup	
