= Sufyan Khan =

Pakistani field hockey player

Personal information
- Born: 13 March 2004 (age 22) Bannu, Khyber Paktunkhwa, Pakistan

Sport
- Sport: Field hockey
- Position: Defence
National team
Years	Team	Caps	Goals
2022–	Pakistan	79	(53)
2023–2025	Pakistan U21	28	(31)
Medal record
Men's field hockey
Representing Pakistan
Asian Games
Bronze medal – third place	2026 Aichi-Nagoya	Team
Asian Champions Trophy
Bronze medal – third place	2024 Hulunbuir
Sultan Azlan Shah Cup
Silver medal – second place	2024 Ipoh
Bronze medal – third place	2022 Ipoh
Junior Asia Cup
Silver medal – second place	2023 Salalah
Silver medal – second place	2024 Muscat

Sufyan Muhammad Khan (born 13 March 2004) is a Pakistani field hockey player. He plays as a defender and is a drag flick specialist.

== Early life ==
Khan was born in Bannu, Khyber Pakhtunkhwa. He was initially mentored in his hometown by former Pakistan hockey player, Ihsanullah, before moving to the Dar Hockey Academy in Lahore.

== Career ==
=== Club ===
Khan played for Pakistan Navy between 2022 and 2023 before moving to Mari Petroleum in 2023.

=== Under–21 ===
Khan represented the Pakistan U–21 side at 2023 Sultan of Johor Cup, 2023 Junior Hockey World Cup, and 2023 Junior Asia Cup.

=== Senior national team ===
Khan made his senior international debut in 2022 at the Sultan Azlan Shah Cup, where the team finished third.

Since his debut, Khan is seen as a penalty corner specialist. He scored 5 goals in the Asian champions Trophy 2023 where Pakistan finished 5th. In the 2023 Asian Games he scored 3 goals where Pakistan failed to qualify for the medal round. He scored once in the 2024 Men's FIH Hockey Olympic Qualifiers where Pakistan failed to qualify for the 2024 Olympics. In the first match of the Azan Shah Cup 2024 against Malaysia he scored his first hatrick, Pakistan registered a 5–4 Victory against Malaysia, thanks to his hatrick, He also scored against South Korea in a 4–0 victory. however, Pakistan lost the Azlan Shah Cup Final to Japan. He scored against Malaysia in the Nations Cup 2024 in a 4–4 draw which was his only goal in the tournament, Pakistan lost the Nations Cup Semi finals to New Zealand and failed to qualify for Pro League. In the Asian champions Trophy 2024 he performed brilliantly once again and scored 6 goals in that tournament, Pakistan won the bronze medal. In 2024 he was awarded FIH Rising Star of the Year (Men) due to his brilliant performances.
