= Kaito Tanaka =

Japanese field hockey player (born 1995)

Personal information
- Born: 1 November 1995 (age 30) Iwate Prefecture, Japan
- Height: 1.78 m (5 ft 10 in)

Sport
- Sport: Field hockey
- Position: Midfielder
- Club: Indicator Light Fullertel
National team
Years	Team	Caps	Goals
2017–present	Japan	56	(5)
Medal record
Men's field hockey
Representing Japan
Asian Games
Gold medal – first place	2018 Jakarta	Team
Silver medal – second place	2022 Hangzhou	Team
Asian Champions Trophy
Silver medal – second place	2021 Dhaka
Bronze medal – third place	2023 Chennai
- Updated on 31 December 2021

Kaito Tanaka (田中 海渡, Tanaka Kaito, born 1 November 1995) is a Japanese field hockey player. He competed in the 2020 Summer Olympics.

He was a part of the Japan squad which won their first Asian Games gold medal in hockey in 2018.
