= New Zealand men's national field hockey team =

New Zealand
- Nickname(s): Black Sticks
- Association: New Zealand Hockey Federation
- Confederation: OHF (Oceania)
- Head Coach: Greg Nicol
- Assistant coach(es): Shea McAleese; Reiner Vellinga
- Manager: David Stones
- Captain: Sam Lane
- Most caps: Phil Burrows (343)
- Top scorer: Phil Burrows (150)
Home	Away

FIH ranking
- Current: 9 (6 November 2026)
- Highest: 5 (2013)
- Lowest: 13 (2023)

First international
- New Zealand 5–4 Australia (Palmerston North, New Zealand; 27 September 1922)

Olympic Games
- Appearances: 14 (first in 1956)
- Best result: (gold) 1st (1976)

World Cup
- Appearances: 12 (first in 1973)
- Best result: 7th (1973, 1975, 1982, 2014, 2023)

Oceania Cup
- Appearances: 11 (first in 1999)
- Best result: (silver) 2nd (12 times)
Medal record
Event	1st	2nd	3rd
Olympic Games	1	0	0
Oceania Cup	0	12	0
Commonwealth Games	0	2	1
Hockey World League	0	1	0
Total	1	15	1
Olympic Games
Gold medal – first place	1976 Montreal	Team
Oceania Cup
Silver medal – second place	1999 Brisbane	
Silver medal – second place	2001 Melbourne	
Silver medal – second place	2003 Christchurch–Wellington	
Silver medal – second place	2005 Suva	
Silver medal – second place	2007 Buderim	
Silver medal – second place	2009 Invercargill	
Silver medal – second place	2011 Hobart	
Silver medal – second place	2013 Stratford	
Silver medal – second place	2015 Stratford	
Silver medal – second place	2017 Sydney	
Silver medal – second place	2019 Rockhampton	
Silver medal – second place	2023 Whangārei	
Champions Challenge
Silver medal – second place	2007 Boom	
Commonwealth Games
Silver medal – second place	2002 Manchester	Team
Silver medal – second place	2018 Gold Coast	Team
Bronze medal – third place	2010 New Delhi	Team
Hockey World League
Silver medal – second place	2012–13 New Delhi	Team

The New Zealand men's national field hockey team, also known as the Black Sticks Men, is the national team for men's field hockey of New Zealand, under the New Zealand Hockey Federation.

At the 1976 Summer Olympics in Montreal, they upset Australia to win gold, becoming the first non-Asian/European team to clinch the gold medal. They have also won silver and bronze at the 2002 and 2010 Commonwealth Games.

== Tournament history ==
=== Summer Olympics ===
- 1956 – 6th place
- 1960 – 5th place
- 1964 – 13th place
- 1968 – 7th place
- 1972 – 9th place
- 1976 – (gold)
- 1984 – 7th place
- 1992 – 8th place
- 2004 – 6th place
- 2008 – 7th place
- 2012 – 9th place
- 2016 – 7th place
- 2020 – 9th place
- 2024 – 12th place

=== World Cup ===
- 1973 – 7th place
- 1975 – 7th place
- 1982 – 7th place
- 1986 – 9th place
- 1998 – 10th place
- 2002 – 9th place
- 2006 – 8th place
- 2010 – 9th place
- 2014 – 7th place
- 2018 – 9th place
- 2023 – 7th place
- 2026 – 9th place

=== Commonwealth Games ===
- 1998 – 6th place
- 2002 – (silver)
- 2006 – 5th place
- 2010 – (bronze)
- 2014 – 4th place
- 2018 – (silver)
- 2022 – 5th place

=== World League ===
- 2012–13 – (silver)
- 2014–15 – 11th place
- 2016–17 – 12th place

=== Pro League ===
- 2019 – 8th place
- 2020–21 – 8th place
- 2021–22 – Withdrew
- 2022–23 – 9th place

=== FIH Hockey Nations Cup ===
- 2023–24 – (gold)
- 2024–25 – (gold)
- 2025–26 – (bronze)
- 2026–27 – Qualified

=== Champions Trophy ===
- 1978 – 4th place
- 1983 – 6th place
- 1984 – 5th place
- 2004 – 6th place
- 2010 – 5th place
- 2011 – 4th place
- 2012 – 7th place

=== Champions Challenge ===
- 2003 – 4th place
- 2007 – (silver)
- 2009 – (gold)
- 2014 – 5th place

=== Oceania Cup ===
- 1999 – (silver)
- 2001 – (silver)
- 2003 – (silver)
- 2005 – (silver)
- 2007 – (silver)
- 2009 – (silver)
- 2011 – (silver)
- 2013 – (silver)
- 2015 – (silver)
- 2017 – (silver)
- 2019 – (silver)
- 2023 – (silver)
- 2025 – (silver)

=== Sultan Azlan Shah Cup ===
- 1991 – 4th place
- 1995 – (bronze)
- 1996 – 4th place
- 1998 – 6th place
- 2000 – 6th place
- 2003 – (bronze)
- 2005 – 4th place
- 2006 – 4th place
- 2008 – (bronze)
- 2009 – (bronze)
- 2011 – 4th place
- 2012 – (gold)
- 2013 – 4th place
- 2015 – (gold)
- 2016 – (bronze)
- 2017 – 4th place
- 2024 – (bronze)
- 2025 – (bronze)

== Results and fixtures ==
The following is a list of match results in the last 12 months, as well as any future matches that have been scheduled.

Win Draw Loss Fixture

=== Summer Series ===
30 January 2026 Test 1	New Zealand	2–5	Japan	Hamilton, New Zealand
18:30	Woods 45'; Hiha 56'	Report	H. Yamada 18', 48', 57'; Yamasaki 35'; Kawabe 54'	Stadium: Gallagher Hockey Centre

1 February 2026 Test 2	New Zealand	5–1	Japan	Hamilton, New Zealand
16:30	Russell 8', 37'; Thomas 23', 35'; Lane 27'	Report	Shinohara 30'	Stadium: Gallagher Hockey Centre

2 February 2026 Test 3	New Zealand	4–3	Japan	Hamilton, New Zealand
18:30	Lane 19', 42'; Woods 29'; Russell 50'	Report	Matsumoto 14', 45'; Yamasaki 33'	Stadium: Gallagher Hockey Centre

4 January 2026 Test 4	New Zealand	3–3	Japan	Hamilton), New Zealand
10:00	Russell 12', 29'; Thomas 48'	Report	H. Yamada 21'; Yamasaki 25', 60'	Stadium: Gallagher Hockey Centre

=== 2026 FIH Nations Cup ===
12 June 2026 Pool A	New Zealand	1–0	Scotland	Cape Town, South Africa
19:00	Thomas 54'	Report		Stadium: Hartleyvale Stadium

14 June 2026 Pool A	South Korea	2–6	New Zealand	Cape Town, South Africa
17:00	Lim 12'; Jang 44'	Report	Russell 31', 52'; Boyde 34'; Thomas 47', 59'; Culhane 55'	Stadium: Hartleyvale Stadium

16 June 2026 Pool A	Malaysia	1–5	New Zealand	Cape Town, South Africa
12:15	Anuar 56'	Report	Russell 18', 25'; Thomas 20'; Houlbrooke 42'; Elmes 51'	Stadium: Hartleyvale Stadium

17 June 2026 Pool A	New Zealand	5–2	Japan	Cape Town, South Africa
19:00	Russell 13', 28'; Boyde 29', 56'; Lane 31'	Report	Watanabe 45'; Matsumoto 46'	Stadium: Hartleyvale Stadium

19 June 2026 Semi finals	New Zealand	2–2 (0–2 p)	South Africa	Cape Town, South Africa
16:45	Russell 12'; Ward 55'	Report	Davis 27'; Melville 32'	Stadium: Hartleyvale Stadium
	Penalties
	Lane (penalty shoot-out missed); Thomas (penalty shoot-out missed); Woods (penalty shoot-out missed); Baker (penalty shoot-out missed)		(penalty shoot-out missed) D. Cassiem; (penalty shoot-out scored) Neethling; (penalty shoot-out scored) Raath

20 June 2026 3/4 classification	New Zealand	3–1	Japan	Cape Town, South Africa
16:45	Lane 27'; Elmes 56'; Hickson 57'	Report	Tanaka 4'	Stadium: Hartleyvale Stadium

=== 2026 Men's FIH Hockey World Cup ===
16 August 2026 Pool A	Netherlands	5–1	New Zealand	Amstelveen, Netherlands
16:00	Hoedemakers 35', 50'; Telgenkamp 41'; Brinkman 49'; Bijen 52'	Report	Hickson 24'	Stadium: Wagener Stadium

18 August 2026 Pool A	New Zealand	2–0	Japan	Amstelveen, Netherlands
09:30	Lane 12'; Thomas 46'	Report		Stadium: Wagener Stadium

20 August 2026 Pool A	New Zealand	1–7	Argentina	Amstelveen, Netherlands
12:30	Russell 13'	Report	Domene 22', 43', 60'; Capurro 39', 58'; Marcucci 48'; Keenan 52'	Stadium: Wagener Stadium

22 August 2026 Pool G	New Zealand	7–2	Wales	Amstelveen, Netherlands
10:00	Hickson 22', 25', 56'; Boyde 32'; Russell 35'; Ward 41'; Lane 48'	Report	Morgan 8', 23'	Stadium: Wagener Stadium

24 August 2026 Pool G	New Zealand	4–2	Pakistan	Amstelveen, Netherlands
12:30	Thomas 1'; Boyde 16'; Baker 22'; Russell 49'	Report	Khan 33'; Afraz 38'	Stadium: Wagener Stadium

28 August 2026 9th place match	New Zealand	6–3	Ireland	Wavre, Belgium
14:00	Russell 3', 14'; Baker 21'; Lane 26', 46'; Ward 58'	Report	Williams 37'; Cole 38'; Duncan 60'	Stadium: Belfius Hockey Arena

=== Indian Centenary Hockey Series ===
19 November 2026 Match 1	New Zealand	2–3	India	Auckland, New Zealand
18:30	Elmes 25'; Hiha 55'	Report	Uttam 25'; Sharda Nand 38'; Sanjay 43'	Stadium: Lloyd Elsmore Park

21 November 2026 Match 2	New Zealand	2–2	India	Auckland, New Zealand
16:00	Thomas 25'; Hiha 56'	Report	Angad 35'; Sanjay 57'	Stadium: Lloyd Elsmore Park

22 November 2026 Match 3	New Zealand	2–2	India	Auckland, New Zealand
14:00	Thomas 9'; Culhane 55'	Report	Sanjay 16'; Karthi 18'	Stadium: Lloyd Elsmore Park

== Team ==
=== Current squad ===
Roster for the Indian Centenary Hockey Series.

Head coach:

2. Dean Clarkson
5. Zander Fraser
7. Javahn Jones
8. Richard Joyce(GK)
9. Sam Hiha
10. Timothy Greenwood
13. Sam Lints
16. Aidan Sarikaya
17. Nic Woods
19. Joseph Morrison
23. Dylan Thomas
27. Scott Cosslett
28. Luke Holmes
29. Gus Nelson
33. Jonty Elmes
35. Ryan Parr
36. Patrick Ward
38. Benjamin Culhane
40. Matthew Ruetsch(GK)
41. Tim Neild

=== Notable players ===
- Paul Ackerley
- Scott Anderson
- Jeff Archibald
- Ryan Archibald
- Phil Burrows
- Simon Child
- Tony Ineson
- Ramesh Patel
- Hayden Shaw
- Nick Wilson
- Selwyn Maister
- Barry Maister
- Brett Leaver
- Trevor Manning
- Jamie Smith
- Peter Daji
- Campbell Garry
- Austen Haig
- Richard Clouston
- Marc Keil
- Cooper Gilmore
- Fred Meehan

== See also ==
- New Zealand women's national field hockey team
