= Ryoma Ooka =

Japanese field hockey player

Personal information
- Born: 2 October 2001 (age 24) Imaichi, Tochigi Japan
- Height: 167 cm (5 ft 6 in)

Sport
- Sport: Field hockey
- Position: Forward
National team
Years	Team	Caps	Goals
2021–	Japan	31	(12)
Medal record
Men's field hockey
Representing Japan
Asian Games
Silver medal – second place	2022 Hangzhou	Team
Asian Champions Trophy
Silver medal – second place	2021 Dhaka	Team
Bronze medal – third place	2023 Chennai	Team

Ryoma Ooka (大岡 凌磨, born 2 October 2001) is a field hockey player from Japan, who plays as a forward.

== Career ==
=== Senior national team ===
Ooka made his senior international debut in 2021.

Since his debut, Ooka has medalled at two Asian Champions Trophies. At the 2021 edition in Dhaka he won silver, followed by bronze at the 2023 edition in Chennai.

In 2023, Ooka was named to the national team for the FIH World Cup in Bhubaneswar and Rourkela, as well as the Asian Games in Hangzhou. At the Asian Games, he won a silver medal.
