= Scott Boyde =

Australia field hockey player (born 1994)

Personal information
- Born: 5 August 1994 (age 32) Brisbane, Australia

Sport
- Sport: Field hockey
- Position: Forward
Senior career
Years	Team	Caps	Goals
2015–2018	Queensland Blades	-	-
2019–	Brisbane Blaze	-	-
National team
Years	Team	Caps	Goals
2016	Australia	7	(1)
2023–	New Zealand	35	(7)
Medal record
Men's field hockey
Representing New Zealand
Oceania Cup
Silver medal – second place	2023 Whangārei
Silver medal – second place	2025 Darwin

Scott Boyde (born 5 August 1994) is an Australian born field hockey player, who plays as a forward for the New Zealand national field hockey team. He also formerly represented Australia in 2016.

== Personal life ==
Scott Boyde was born and raised in Brisbane, Queensland.

He also was a teacher at Wellington Point State High School but left to pursue his career in field hockey, after being announced for the Olympic squad in 2024.

== Career ==
=== Domestic league ===
Boyde is a member of the Brisbane Blaze in Hockey Australia's national league, the JDH Hockey One. He made his debut in the inaugural season of the league.

=== Kookaburras ===
In 2016, Boyde made his debut for the Australian national team, the Kookaburras. He appeared at the Trans–Tasman Trophy in Auckland, and the International Festival of Hockey in Victoria.

=== Black Sticks ===
Following a seven–year hiatus from international hockey, Boyde returned to the international scene in 2023 with the New Zealand Black Sticks. As his parents are of New Zealand descent, Boyde was eligible to represent his parents' home nation, thus receiving a call up from head coach, Greg Nicol. He made his Black Sticks debut during season four of the FIH Pro League. He followed this up with a silver medal showing at the Oceania Cup in Whangārei.

Boyde has been named in the official Black Sticks squad for the 2024 season.
