= India men's national field hockey team results (2021–2024) =

- Season: 2021–2024

This page documents the international match results of the India men's national field hockey team from 2021 to 2024. It includes official and unofficial matches and tournaments played during the period, organized chronologically by year and competition.

India won bronze medal at the Tokyo 2020 and ended their 41-year Olympic medal drought. They retained the medal at the Paris 2024, securing back-to-back Olympic medals for the first time since 1968 and 1972. They also clinched their fourth Asiad gold at the 2022 Asian Games after nine years.

Competition	1st place, gold medalist(s)	2nd place, silver medalist(s)	3rd place, bronze medalist(s)
Olympic Games	0	0	2
Asian Games	1	0	0
Pro League	0	0	1
Asia Cup	0	0	1
Asian Champions Trophy	2	0	1
Commonwealth Games	0	1	0
Total	3	1	5

== List of tours ==
Year	Host(s)	Competition	GP	W	D	L	GF	GA	Result	Position	Head Coach
2021	N/A	2020–21 Men's FIH Pro League	2	1	1	0	5	2	–	4th	(Australia) Graham Reid
2021	Japan	2020 Olympics	8	6	0	2	25	23	3rd place, bronze medalist(s)	3rd	(Australia) Graham Reid
2021	Bangladesh	2021 Men's Asian Champions Trophy	6	4	1	1	27	11	3rd place, bronze medalist(s)	3rd	(Australia) Graham Reid
2022	N/A	2021–22 Men's FIH Pro League	16	8	3	5	51	42	3rd place, bronze medalist(s)	3rd	(Australia) Graham Reid
2022	Indonesia	2022 Men's Hockey Asia Cup	7	3	3	1	29	14	3rd place, bronze medalist(s)	3rd	(India) Sardar Singh
2022	England	2022 Commonwealth Games	6	4	1	1	30	14	2nd place, silver medalist(s)	Runners-up	(Australia) Graham Reid
2022	N/A	2022–23 Men's FIH Pro League	4	2	1	1	15	12			(Australia) Graham Reid
2022	Australia	Australia Test Series	5	1	0	4	17	25	–	–	(Australia) Graham Reid
2023	India	2023 World Cup	6	4	2	0	22	7	Eliminated in Crossover	9th	(Australia) Graham Reid
2023	N/A	2022–23 Men's FIH Pro League	12	6	2	4	36	30	–	4th	(South Africa) Craig Fulton
2023	Spain	Torneo del Centenario 2023	4	1	2	1	5	5	3rd place, bronze medalist(s)	3rd	(South Africa) Craig Fulton
2023	India	2023 Men's Asian Champions Trophy	7	6	1	0	29	8	1st place, gold medalist(s)	Champions	(South Africa) Craig Fulton
2023	Japan	2022 Asian Games	7	7	0	0	68	9	1st place, gold medalist(s)	Champions	(South Africa) Craig Fulton
2024	South Africa	South Africa Test Series	4	2	1	1	10	7	–	–	(South Africa) Craig Fulton
2024	N/A	2023–24 Men's FIH Pro League	16	5	6	5	38	35	–	7th	(South Africa) Craig Fulton
2024	Australia	Australia Test Series	5	0	0	5	7	17	–	–	(South Africa) Craig Fulton
2024	France	2024 Olympics	8	4	2	2	15	12	3rd place, bronze medalist(s)	3rd	(South Africa) Craig Fulton
2024	China	2024 Men's Asian Champions Trophy	7	7	0	0	26	5	1st place, gold medalist(s)	Champions	(South Africa) Craig Fulton
2024	India	Germany Test Series	2	1	0	1	5	5	–	–	(South Africa) Craig Fulton

== 2021 ==
10 April 2021 2020–21 FIH Pro League	Argentina	2–2 (2–3 p)	India	Buenos Aires, Argentina
17:00	Ferreiro 28', 30'	Report	Harmanpreet 21', 60'	Stadium: CeNARD
	Penalties
	Keenan (penalty shoot-out scored); Martínez (penalty shoot-out scored); Vila (penalty shoot-out missed); Ferreiro (penalty shoot-out missed); Ortiz (penalty shoot-out missed)		(penalty shoot-out missed) Harmanpreet; (penalty shoot-out scored) Lalit; (penalty shoot-out scored) Rupinder; (penalty shoot-out missed) Shamsher; (penalty shoot-out scored) Dilpreet

11 April 2021 2020–21 FIH Pro League	Argentina	0–3	India	Buenos Aires, Argentina
17:00		Report	Harmanpreet 11'; Lalit 25'; Mandeep 58'	Stadium: CeNARD

24 July 2021 2020 Summer Olympics	New Zealand	2–3	India	Tokyo, Japan
10:00	Russell 6'; Jenness 43'	Report	Rupinder 10'; Harmanpreet 26', 33'	Stadium: Oi Hockey Stadium

25 July 2021 2020 Summer Olympics	India	1–7	Australia	Tokyo, Japan
18:30	Dilpreet 34'	Report	Beale 10'; Hayward 21'; Ogilvie 23'; Beltz 26'; Govers 40', 42'; Brand 51'	Stadium: Oi Hockey Stadium

27 July 2021 2020 Summer Olympics	India	3–0	Spain	Tokyo, Japan
10:00	Simranjeet 14'; Rupinder 15', 51'	Report		Stadium: Oi Hockey Stadium

29 July 2021 2020 Summer Olympics	India	3–1	Argentina	Tokyo, Japan
09:30	Varun 43'; Vivek 58'; Harmanpreet 59'	Report	Casella 48'	Stadium: Oi Hockey Stadium

30 July 2021 2020 Summer Olympics	Japan	3–5	India	Tokyo, Japan
18:30	Ke. Tanaka 19'; Watanabe 33'; Murata 59'	Report	Harmanpreet 13'; Gurjant 17', 56'; Shamsher 34'; Nilakanta 51'	Stadium: Oi Hockey Stadium

1 August 2021 2020 Summer Olympics	India	3–1	Great Britain	Tokyo, Japan
21:00	Dilpreet 7'; Gurjant 16'; Hardik 57'	Report	Ward 45'	Stadium: Oi Hockey Stadium

3 August 2021 2020 Summer Olympics	India	2–5	Belgium	Tokyo, Japan
10:30	Harmanpreet 7'; Mandeep 8'	Report	Luypaert 2'; Hendrickx 19', 49', 53'; Dohmen 60'	Stadium: Oi Hockey Stadium

5 August 2021 2020 Summer Olympics	Germany	4–5	India	Tokyo, Japan
10:30	Oruz 2'; Wellen 24'; Fürk 25'; Windfeder 48'	Report	Simranjeet 17', 34'; Hardik 27'; Harmanpreet 29'; Rupinder 31'	Stadium: Oi Hockey Stadium

14 December 2021 2021 Asian Champions Trophy	South Korea	2–2	India	Dhaka, Bangladesh
15:30	Jang Jong-hyun 42'; Kim Sung-hyun 46'	Report	Lalit 3'; Harmanpreet 33'	Stadium: Maulana Bhasani Hockey Stadium

15 December 2021 2021 Asian Champions Trophy	India	9–0	Bangladesh	Dhaka, Bangladesh
15:30	Dilpreet 12', 22', 44'; Lalit 29'; Jarmanpreet 31', 43'; Akashdeep 54'; Mandeep 55'; Harmanpreet 57'	Report		Stadium: Maulana Bhasani Hockey Stadium

17 December 2021 2021 Asian Champions Trophy	India	3–1	Pakistan	Dhaka, Bangladesh
15:30	Harmanpreet 9', 53'; Akashdeep 42'	Report	Manzoor 45'	Stadium: Maulana Bhasani Hockey Stadium

19 December 2021 2021 Asian Champions Trophy	India	6–0	Japan	Dhaka, Bangladesh
15:30	Harmanpreet 10', 53'; Dilpreet 23'; Jarmanpreet 34'; Sumit 46'; Shamsher 54'	Report		Stadium: Maulana Bhasani Hockey Stadium

21 December 2021 2021 Asian Champions Trophy	India	3–5	Japan	Dhaka, Bangladesh
18:00	Dilpreet 17'; Harmanpreet 53'; Hardik 59'	Report	Yamada 1'; Fujishima 2'; Kirishita 29'; Kawabe 35'; Ooka 41'	Stadium: Maulana Bhasani Hockey Stadium

22 December 2021 2021 Asian Champions Trophy	Pakistan	3–4	India	Dhaka, Bangladesh
15:30	Afraz 10'; Rana 33'; Shakeel 57'	Report	Harmanpreet 2'; Sumit 45'; Varun 54'; Akashdeep 57'	Stadium: Maulana Bhasani Hockey Stadium

== 2022 ==
8 February 2022 2021–22 FIH Pro League	France	0–5	India	Potchefstroom, South Africa
18:00		Report	Harmanpreet 21'; Varun 24'; Shamsher 28'; Mandeep 32'; Akashdeep 41'	Stadium: NWU Astro

9 February 2022 2021–22 FIH Pro League	South Africa	2–10	India	Potchefstroom, South Africa
18:00	Bell 44'; Pautz 45'	Report	Harmanpreet 2'; Jugraj 4', 6', 23'; Abhishek 12'; Gursahibjit 24', 36'; Dilpreet 25', 58'; Mandeep 27'	Stadium: NWU Astro

12 February 2022 2021–22 FIH Pro League	France	5–2	India	Potchefstroom, South Africa
18:00	Charlet 16', 59'; Lockwood 35'; Masson 48'; T. Clément 60'	Report	Jarmanpreet 22'; Harmanpreet 57'	Stadium: NWU Astro

13 February 2022 2021–22 FIH Pro League	South Africa	2–10	India	Potchefstroom, South Africa
18:00	Bell 12'; Beauchamp 53'	Report	Varun 15'; Shilanand 27', 48'; Mandeep 28'; Harmanpreet 13', 52', 60', 60'; Sumit 45'; Shamsher 56'	Stadium: NWU Astro

26 February 2022 2021–22 FIH Pro League	India	5–4	Spain	Bhubaneswar, India
19:30	Harmanpreet 15', 60'; Shilanand 41'; Shamsher 43'; Varun 55'	Report	Pa. Cunill 14'; Miralles 20', 23', 40'	Stadium: Kalinga Stadium

27 February 2022 2021–22 FIH Pro League	India	3–5	Spain	Bhubaneswar, India
19:30	Abhishek 6'; Harmanpreet 27'; Sukhjeet 51'	Report	Pa. Cunill 14', 24'; Tarrés 14'; Pe. Cunill 54'; Miralles 59'	Stadium: Kalinga Stadium

19 March 2022 2021–22 FIH Pro League	India	2–2 (1–3 p)	Argentina	Bhubaneswar, India
19:30	Gurjant 38'; Mandeep 60'	Report	Acosta 45'; Keenan 52'	Stadium: Kalinga Stadium
	Penalties
	Harmanpreet (penalty shoot-out scored); Abhishek (penalty shoot-out missed); Gurjant (penalty shoot-out missed); Sukhjeet (penalty shoot-out missed)		(penalty shoot-out scored) Keenan; (penalty shoot-out scored) Domene; (penalty shoot-out scored) Toscani; (penalty shoot-out missed) Ferreiro

20 March 2022 2021–22 FIH Pro League	India	4–3	Argentina	Bhubaneswar, India
19:30	Hardik 17'; Jugraj 20', 52'; Mandeep 60'	Report	Della Torre 40'; Domene 51'; Ferreiro 56'	Stadium: Kalinga Stadium

2 April 2022 2021–22 FIH Pro League	India	3–3 (3–2 p)	England	Bhubaneswar, India
19:30	Abhishek 14'; Shamsher 27'; Harmanpreet 52'	Report	Bandurak 8', 28'; Ward 60'	Stadium: Kalinga Stadium
	Penalties
	Harmanpreet (penalty shoot-out missed); Shamsher (penalty shoot-out missed); Raj (penalty shoot-out scored); Abhishek (penalty shoot-out scored); Vivek (penalty shoot-out missed); Harmanpreet (penalty shoot-out missed); Abhishek (penalty shoot-out scored)		(penalty shoot-out missed) Ansell; (penalty shoot-out scored) Griffiths; (penalty shoot-out missed) Sorsby; (penalty shoot-out scored) Albery; (penalty shoot-out missed) Goodfield; (penalty shoot-out missed) Griffiths; (penalty shoot-out missed) Ansell

3 April 2022 2021–22 FIH Pro League	India	4–3	England	Bhubaneswar, India
19:30	Manpreet 15+'; Harmanpreet 26', 26', 43'	Report	Sanford 7'; Condon 39'; Ward	Stadium: Kalinga Stadium

14 April 2022 2021–22 FIH Pro League	India	3–0	Germany	Bhubaneswar, India
19:30	Harmanpreet 18', 28'; Abhishek 44'	Report		Stadium: Kalinga Stadium

15 April 2022 2021–22 FIH Pro League	India	3–1	Germany	Bhubaneswar, India
19:30	Sukhjeet 19'; Varun 41'; Abhishek 54'	Report	Boeckel 45'	Stadium: Kalinga Stadium

23 May 2022 2022 Asia Cup	India	1–1	Pakistan	Jakarta, Indonesia
18:30	Karthi 9'	Report	Rana 59'	Stadium: GBK Sports Complex

24 May 2022 2022 Asia Cup	Japan	5–2	India	Jakarta, Indonesia
18:30	Nagayoshi 24'; Kawabe 40', 56'; Ooka 49'; Yamasaki 54'	Report	Pawan 45'; Uttam 50'	Stadium: GBK Sports Complex

26 May 2022 2022 Asia Cup	India	16–0	Indonesia	Jakarta, Indonesia
18:30	Rajbhar 10', 11'; U. Singh 14'; Sunil 19', 24'; Nilam 20'; Karthi 40', 56'; Lakra 41'; Tirkey 42', 47', 59', 59'; Belimagga 45', 46', 55'	Report		Stadium: GBK Sports Complex

28 May 2022 2022 Asia Cup Super 4	India	2–1	Japan	Jakarta, Indonesia
18:30	Manjeet 8'; Pawan 35'	Report	Niwa 18'	Stadium: GBK Sports Complex

29 May 2022 2022 Asia Cup Super 4	Malaysia	3–3	India	Jakarta, Indonesia
18:30	Rahim 12', 21', 56'	Report	Vishnukant 32'; Sunil 53'; Nilam 55'	Stadium: GBK Sports Complex

31 May 2022 2022 Asia Cup Super 4	India	4–4	South Korea	Jakarta, Indonesia
18:30	Nilam 9'; Maninder 21'; Sheshe 22'; Mareeswaran 37'	Report	Jang 13'; Ji 18'; Kim Ju. 28'; Jung 44'	Stadium: GBK Sports Complex

1 June 2022 2022 Asia Cup 3rd place	India	1–0	Japan	Jakarta, Indonesia
18:30	Pal 7'	Report		Stadium: GBK Sports Complex

11 June 2022 2021–22 FIH Pro League	Belgium	3–3 (4–5 p)	India	Antwerp, Belgium
16:30	Charlier 21'; Gougnard 36'; De Kerpel 51'	Report	Shamsher 18'; Harmanpreet 52'; Jarmanpreet 58'	Stadium: Wilrijkse Plein Antwerp
	Penalties
	Boccard (penalty shoot-out scored); Cosyns (penalty shoot-out scored); Gougnard (penalty shoot-out scored); De Sloover (penalty shoot-out scored); De Kerpel (penalty shoot-out missed)		(penalty shoot-out scored) Harmanpreet; (penalty shoot-out scored) Abhishek; (penalty shoot-out scored) Lalit; (penalty shoot-out scored) Shamsher; (penalty shoot-out scored) Akashdeep

12 June 2022 2021–22 FIH Pro League	Belgium	3–2	India	Antwerp, Belgium
16:30	De Kerpel 33'; Hendrickx 49', 59'	Report	Abhishek 25'; Mandeep 60'	Stadium: Wilrijkse Plein Antwerp

18 June 2022 2021–22 FIH Pro League	Netherlands	2–2 (4–1 p)	India	Rotterdam, Netherlands
16:30	Reyenga 10'; Bijen 47'	Report	Dilpreet 22'; Harmanpreet 60+'	Stadium: Hazelaarweg Stadion
	Penalties
	Pieters (penalty shoot-out scored); Van Dam (penalty shoot-out scored); De Geus (penalty shoot-out scored); Bijen (penalty shoot-out scored)		(penalty shoot-out missed) Harmanpreet; (penalty shoot-out missed) Abhishek; (penalty shoot-out scored) Vivek

19 June 2022 2021–22 FIH Pro League	Netherlands	2–1	India	Rotterdam, Netherlands
16:30	Janssen 7'; Croon 45'	Report	Abhishek 1'	Stadium: Hazelaarweg Stadion

July 31, 2022 2022 Commonwealth Games	India	11–0	Ghana	Birmingham, England
16:00	Abhishek 2'; Harmanpreet 10', 36', 54'; Shamsher 14'; Akashdeep 20'; Jugraj 22', 45'; Nilakanta 39'; Varun 40'; Mandeep 48'	Report		Stadium: University of Birmingham Hockey and Squash Centre

August 1, 2022 2022 Commonwealth Games	England	4–4	India	Birmingham, England
16:00	Ansell 42'; Bandurak 47', 53'; Roper 51'	Report	Lalit 3'; Mandeep 13', 22'; Harmanpreet 46'	Stadium: University of Birmingham Hockey and Squash Centre

August 3, 2022 2022 Commonwealth Games	Canada	0–8	India	Birmingham, England
14:00		Report	Harmanpreet 7', 56'; Amit 10'; Lalit 20'; Gurjant 27'; Akashdeep 37', 60'; Mandeep 58'	Stadium: University of Birmingham Hockey and Squash Centre

August 4, 2022 2022 Commonwealth Games	India	4–1	Wales	Birmingham, England
14:00	Harmanpreet 18', 19', 41'; Gurjant 49'	Report	Furlong 55'	Stadium: University of Birmingham Hockey and Squash Centre

August 6, 2022 2022 Commonwealth Games	India	3–2	South Africa	Birmingham, England
18:00	Abhishek 20'; Mandeep 28'; Jugraj 58'	Report	Julius 33'; M. Cassiem 59'	Stadium: University of Birmingham Hockey and Squash Centre

August 8, 2022 2022 Commonwealth Games	Australia	7–0	India	Birmingham, England
12:30	Govers 9'; Ephraums 14', 42'; Anderson 22', 27'; Wickham 26'; Ogilvie 46'	Report		Stadium: University of Birmingham Hockey and Squash Centre

28 October 2022 2022–23 FIH Pro League	India	4–3	New Zealand	Bhubaneswar, India
19:30	Mandeep M. 14'; Harmanpreet 42'; Mandeep S. 52', 57'	Report	Lane 23', 36'; Smith 35'	Stadium: Kalinga Stadium

30 October 2022 2022–23 FIH Pro League	India	2–3	Spain	Bhubaneswar, India
19:30	Harmanpreet 27'; Abhishek 55'	Report	De Ignacio-Simó 17'; Miralles 27'; Reyné 57'	Stadium: Kalinga Stadium

4 November 2022 2022–23 FIH Pro League	India	7–4	New Zealand	Bhubaneswar, India
19:30	Harmanpreet 7', 19'; Karthi 17', 38'; Raj 31'; Sukhjeet 50'; Jugraj 53'	Report	Child 2'; Lane 9'; Smith 14'	Stadium: Kalinga Stadium

6 November 2022 2022–23 FIH Pro League	India	2–2 (3–1 p)	Spain	Bhubaneswar, India
19:30	Harmanpreet 12', 32'	Report	Miralles 43'; Amat 55'	Stadium: Kalinga Stadium
	Penalties
	Harmanpreet (penalty shoot-out scored); Raj Kumar (penalty shoot-out scored); Shamsher (penalty shoot-out missed); Abhishek (penalty shoot-out scored)		(penalty shoot-out missed) Menini; (penalty shoot-out missed) Vilallonga; (penalty shoot-out scored) Clapés; (penalty shoot-out missed) Miralles

26 November 2022 Australia–India Test Series	Australia	5–4	India	Adelaide, Australia
16:00	Sharp 5'; Ephraums 21'; Craig 41'; Govers 57', 60+'	Report	Akashdeep 10', 27', 59'; Harmanpreet 31'	Stadium: MATE Stadium

27 November 2022 Australia–India Test Series	Australia	7–4	India	Adelaide, Australia
16:00	Govers 12', 27', 53'; Welch 17', 24'; Anderson 48'; Whetton 49'	Report	Harmanpreet 3', 60'; Hardik 25'; Raheel 36'	Stadium: MATE Stadium

30 November 2022 Australia–India Test Series	Australia	3–4	India	Adelaide, Australia
18:30	Welch 25'; Zalewski 32'; Ephraums 59'	Report	Manpreet 12'; Abhishek 47'; Shamsher 57'; Akashdeep 60'	Stadium: MATE Stadium

3 December 2022 Australia–India Test Series	Australia	5–1	India	Adelaide, Australia
16:00	Hayward 29', 41'; Whetton 30'; Wickham 34'; Dawson 54'	Report	Dilpreet 25'	Stadium: MATE Stadium

4 December 2022 Australia–India Test Series	Australia	5–4	India	Adelaide, Australia
16:00	Wickham 2', 17'; Zalewski 30'; Anderson 40'; Whetton 54'	Report	Harmanpreet 24', 60'; Rohidas 34'; Sukhjeet 55'	Stadium: MATE Stadium

== 2023 ==
13 January 2023 2023 Hockey World Cup GS	India	2–0	Spain	Rourkela, India
17:00	Amit 13'; Hardik 27'	Report		Stadium: Birsa Munda International Hockey Stadium

15 January 2023 2023 Hockey World Cup GS	England	0–0	India	Rourkela, India
17:00		Report		Stadium: Birsa Munda International Hockey Stadium

19 January 2023 2023 Hockey World Cup GS	India	4–2	Wales	Bhubaneswar, India
19:00	Shamsher 22'; Akashdeep 33', 46'; Harmanpreet 60'	Report	Furlong 43'; Draper 45'	Stadium: Kalinga Stadium

22 January 2023 2023 Hockey World Cup CO	India	3–3 (4–5 p)	New Zealand	Bhubaneswar, India
19:00	Lalit 18'; Sukhjeet 25'; Varun 41'	Report	Lane 29'; Russell 44'; Findlay 50'	Stadium: Kalinga Stadium
	Penalties
	Harmanpreet (penalty shoot-out scored); Raj (penalty shoot-out scored); Abhishek (penalty shoot-out missed); Shamsher (penalty shoot-out missed); Sukhjeet (penalty shoot-out scored); Harmanpreet (penalty shoot-out missed); Raj (penalty shoot-out scored); Sukhjeet (penalty shoot-out missed); Shamsher (penalty shoot-out missed)		(penalty shoot-out scored) Woods; (penalty shoot-out scored) Findlay; (penalty shoot-out scored) Phillips; (penalty shoot-out missed) Lane; (penalty shoot-out missed) Hiha; (penalty shoot-out missed) Woods; (penalty shoot-out scored) Findlay; (penalty shoot-out missed) Phillips; (penalty shoot-out scored) Lane

26 January 2023 2023 Hockey World Cup CL	Japan	0–8	India	Rourkela, India
19:00		Report	Mandeep 33'; Abhishek 36', 44'; Vivek 40'; Harmanpreet 46', 59'; Manpreet 59'; Sukhjeet 60'	Stadium: Birsa Munda International Hockey Stadium

28 January 2023 2023 Hockey World Cup CL	South Africa	2–5	India	Rourkela, India
16:30	Mvimbi 49'; M. Cassiem 60'	Report	Abhishek 5'; Harmanpreet 12'; Shamsher 56'; Akashdeep 49'; Sukhjeet 59'	Stadium: Birsa Munda International Hockey Stadium

10 March 2023 2022–23 FIH Pro League	India	3–2	Germany	Rourkela, India
19:30	Harmanpreet 30+'; Sukhjeet 32', 43'	Report	Kaufmann 45'; Struthoff 58'	Stadium: Birsa Munda International Hockey Stadium

12 March 2023 2022–23 FIH Pro League	India	5–4	Australia	Rourkela, India
19:30	Harmanpreet 14', 15', 56'; Jugraj 18'; Karthi 26'	Report	Beltz 3'; Willott 43'; Staines 53'; Zalewski 57'	Stadium: Birsa Munda International Hockey Stadium

13 March 2023 2022–23 FIH Pro League	India	6–3	Germany	Rourkela, India
19:30	Jugraj 21'; Abhishek 22', 51'; Karthi 24', 46'; Harmanpreet 26'	Report	T. Grambusch 3'; Peillat 23'; Hellwig 31'	Stadium: Birsa Munda International Hockey Stadium

15 March 2023 2022–23 FIH Pro League	India	2–2 (4–3 p)	Australia	Rourkela, India
19:30	Prasad 2'; Sukhjeet 47'	Report	Ephraums 37'; Howard 52'	Stadium: Birsa Munda International Hockey Stadium
	Penalties
	Harmanpreet (penalty shoot-out scored); Hardik (penalty shoot-out missed); Prasad (penalty shoot-out missed); Sukhjeet (penalty shoot-out scored); Dilpreet (penalty shoot-out scored); Harmanpreet (penalty shoot-out scored)		(penalty shoot-out missed) Whetton; (penalty shoot-out scored) Harvie; (penalty shoot-out scored) Marais; (penalty shoot-out scored) Welch; (penalty shoot-out missed) Ephraums; (penalty shoot-out missed) Welch

26 May 2023 2022–23 FIH Pro League	Belgium	2–1	India	London, Great Britain
14:30	T. Stockbroekx 18'; Onana 60'	Report	Mandeep 25'	Stadium: Lee Valley Hockey and Tennis Centre

27 May 2023 2022–23 FIH Pro League	Great Britain	4–2	India	London, Great Britain
12:30	Nurse 7'; Sorsby 32'; Morton 34'; Bandurak 54'	Report	Harmanpreet 14', 43'	Stadium: Lee Valley Hockey and Tennis Centre

2 June 2023 2022–23 FIH Pro League	India	5–1	Belgium	London, Great Britain
14:30	Vivek 2'; Harmanpreet 21', 40'; Amit 20'; Dilpreet 60'	Report	Ghislain 46'	Stadium: Lee Valley Hockey and Tennis Centre

3 June 2023 2022–23 FIH Pro League	Great Britain	4–4 (2–4 p)	India	London, Great Britain
12:30	Ward 8', 40', 47', 53'	Report	Harmanpreet 7'; Mandeep 19'; Sukhjeet 28'; Abhishek 60'	Stadium: Lee Valley Hockey and Tennis Centre
	Penalties
	Calnan (penalty shoot-out scored); Wallace (penalty shoot-out scored); Shipperley (penalty shoot-out missed); Roper (penalty shoot-out missed)		(penalty shoot-out scored) Manpreet; (penalty shoot-out scored) Harmanpreet; (penalty shoot-out scored) Lalit; (penalty shoot-out scored) Abhishek

7 June 2023 2022–23 FIH Pro League	Netherlands	4–1	India	Eindhoven, Netherlands
18:30	P. Reyenga 17'; Burkhardt 40'; Telgenkamp 41', 58'	Report	Harmanpreet 11'	Stadium: HC Oranje-Rood

8 June 2023 2022–23 FIH Pro League	Argentina	0–3	India	Eindhoven, Netherlands
18:00		Report	Harmanpreet 32'; Amit 38'; Abhishek 58'	Stadium: HC Oranje-Rood

10 June 2023 2022–23 FIH Pro League	Netherlands	3–2	India	Eindhoven, Netherlands
15:00	Telgenkamp 7'; Burkhardt 41'; Hoedemakers 43'	Report	Sanjay 18'; Gurjant 46'	Stadium: HC Oranje-Rood

11 June 2023 2022–23 FIH Pro League	India	2–1	Argentina	Eindhoven, Netherlands
15:00	Akashdeep 1'; Sukhjeet 13'	Report	Toscani 57'	Stadium: HC Oranje-Rood

25 July 2023 Torneo del Centenario 2023	Spain	2–1	India	Terrassa, Spain
20:00	Cunill 11'; Menini 33'	Report	Harmanpreet 59'	Stadium: Estadi Martí Colomer

26 July 2023 Torneo del Centenario 2023	India	1–1	Netherlands	Terrassa, Spain
18:00	Harmanpreet 12'	Report	Brinkman 40'	Stadium: Estadi Martí Colomer

28 July 2023 Torneo del Centenario 2023	India	1–1	England	Terrassa, Spain
13:00	Harmanpreet 29'	Report	Ward 5'	Stadium: Estadi Martí Colomer

30 July 2023 Torneo del Centenario 2023	Netherlands	1–2	India	Terrassa, Spain
13:00	Brinkman 25'	Report	Harmanpreet 15'; Dilpreet 50'	Stadium: Estadi Martí Colomer

3 August 2023 2023 Asian Champions Trophy GS	India	7–2	China	Chennai, India
20:30	Harmanpreet 5', 8'; Sukhjeet 15'; Akashdeep 16'; Varun 19', 30'; Mandeep 40'	Report	E Wenhui 18'; Gao Jiesheng 25'	Stadium: Mayor Radhakrishnan Stadium

4 August 2023 2023 Asian Champions Trophy GS	India	1–1	Japan	Chennai, India
20:30	Harmanpreet 43'	Report	Nagayoshi 28'	Stadium: Mayor Radhakrishnan Stadium

6 August 2023 2023 Asian Champions Trophy GS	Malaysia	0–5	India	Chennai, India
20:30		Report	Karthi 15'; Hardik 32'; Harmanpreet 42'; Gurjant 53'; Jugraj 54'	Stadium: Mayor Radhakrishnan Stadium

7 August 2023 2023 Asian Champions Trophy GS	South Korea	2–3	India	Chennai, India
20:30	Kim Sung-hyun 12'; Yang Ji-hun 58'	Report	Nilakanta 6'; Harmanpreet 23'; Mandeep 33'	Stadium: Mayor Radhakrishnan Stadium

9 August 2023 2023 Asian Champions Trophy GS	India	4–0	Pakistan	Chennai, India
20:30	Harmanpreet 15', 23'; Jugraj 36'; Akashdeep 55'	Report		Stadium: Mayor Radhakrishnan Stadium

11 August 2023 2023 Asian Champions Trophy SF	India	5–0	Japan	Chennai, India
20:30	Akashdeep 19'; Harmanpreet 23'; Mandeep 30'; Sumit 39'; Karthi 51'	Report		Stadium: Mayor Radhakrishnan Stadium

12 August 2023 2023 Asian Champions Trophy F	Malaysia	3–4	India	Chennai, India
20:30	Azrai Abu Kamal 14'; Razie 18'; Muhamad Aminudin 28'	Report	Jugraj 9'; Harmanpreet 45'; Gurjant 45'; Akashdeep 56'	Stadium: Mayor Radhakrishnan Stadium

24 September 2023 2022 Asian Games PR	India	16–0	Uzbekistan	Hangzhou, China
11:15	Lalit 7', 24', 53'; Varun 12', 36', 50', 52'; Abhishek 17'; Mandeep 18', 27', 28'; Sukhjeet 37', 42'; Amit 38'; Shamsher 43'; Sanjay 57'	Report		Stadium: Gongshu Canal Sports Park Stadium

26 September 2023 2022 Asian Games PR	India	16–1	Singapore	Hangzhou, China
09:00	Mandeep 12', 30', 51'; Lalit 16'; Gurjant 22'; Vivek 23'; Harmanpreet 24', 39', 40', 42'; Manpreet 37'; Shamsher 38'; Abhishek 51', 52'; Varun 55', 55'	Report	Zulkarnain 53'	Stadium: Gongshu Canal Sports Park Stadium

28 September 2023 2022 Asian Games PR	Japan	2–4	India	Hangzhou, China
20:45	Genki 56'; Ryosei 60'	Report	Abhishek 13', 48'; Mandeep 24'; Amit 34'	Stadium: Gongshu Canal Sports Park Stadium

30 September 2023 2022 Asian Games PR	Pakistan	2–10	India	Hangzhou, China
20:45	M. Khan 38'; Afraz 45'	Report	Mandeep 8'; Harmanpreet 11', 17', 33', 34'; Sumit 30'; Abhishek 38'; Varun 41', 54'; Hardik 45'; Shamsher 46'; Lalit 49'	Stadium: Gongshu Canal Sports Park Stadium

2 October 2023 2022 Asian Games PR	India	12–0	Bangladesh	Hangzhou, China
15:45	Harmanpreet 2', 4', 32'; Mandeep 18', 24', 46'; Lalit 23'; Amit 28'; Abhishek 41', 57'; Nilakanta 47'; Gurjant 56'	Report		Stadium: Gongshu Canal Sports Park Stadium

4 October 2023 2022 Asian Games SF	India	5–3	South Korea	Hangzhou, China
16:00	Hardik 5'; Mandeep 11'; Lalit 15'; Amit 24'; Abhishek 54'	Report	Jung 17', 20', 42'	Stadium: Gongshu Canal Sports Park Stadium

6 October 2023 2022 Asian Games F	India	5–1	Japan	Hangzhou, China
18:30	Manpreet 25'; Harmanpreet 32', 59'; Amit 36'; Abhishek 48'	Report	S. Tanaka 51'	Stadium: Gongshu Canal Sports Park Stadium

== 2024 ==
22 January 2024 Test Match	France	0–4	India	Cape Town, South Africa
		Report	Harmanpreet 13', 26'; Lalit 42'; Hardik 49'	Stadium: Cape Town

24 January 2024 Test Match	France	2–2	India	Cape Town, South Africa
	Clément 37'; Baumgarten ?'	Report	Mandeep 8'; Rohidas 19'	Stadium: Cape Town

26 January 2024 Test Match	South Africa	0–3	India	Cape Town, South Africa
18:00		Report	Harmanpreet 2'; Abhishek 13'; Sumit 30'	Stadium: Cape Town

28 January 2024 Test Match	Netherlands	5–1	India	Cape Town, South Africa
	Janssen 10', 28'; Telgenkamp 16'; Hoedemakers 21'; Bijen 35'	Report	Abhishek 39'	Stadium: Cape Town

10 February 2024 2023–24 FIH Pro League	India	4–1	Spain	Bhubaneswar, India
19:30	Harmanpreet 7', 20'; Jugraj 24'; Lalit 50'	Report	Miralles 34'	Stadium: Kalinga Stadium

11 February 2024 2023–24 FIH Pro League	India	2–2 (4–2 p)	Netherlands	Bhubaneswar, India
19:30	Hardik 13'; Harmanpreet 58'	Report	Janssen 30'; Bijen 39'	Stadium: Kalinga Stadium
	Penalties
	Harmanpreet (penalty shoot-out scored); Sukhjeet (penalty shoot-out scored); Lalit (penalty shoot-out scored); Shamsher (penalty shoot-out scored)		(penalty shoot-out missed) Croon; (penalty shoot-out scored) T. Brinkman; (penalty shoot-out missed) De Geus; (penalty shoot-out scored) Bijen

15 February 2024 2023–24 FIH Pro League	India	4–6	Australia	Bhubaneswar, India
19:30	Harmanpreet 12', 20'; Sukhjeet 18'; Mandeep 29'	Report	Govers 13', 13', 40'; Sharp 52'; Anderson 55'; Welch 58'	Stadium: Kalinga Stadium

16 February 2024 2023–24 FIH Pro League	India	1–0	Ireland	Bhubaneswar, India
19:30	Gurjant 60'	Report		Stadium: Kalinga Stadium

19 February 2024 2023–24 FIH Pro League	India	2–2 (8–7 p)	Spain	Rourkela, India
19:30	Jarmanpreet 1'; Abhishek 35'	Report	Basterra 3'; Lacalle 15'	Stadium: Birsa Munda International Hockey Stadium
	Penalties
	Harmanpreet (penalty shoot-out scored); Sukhjeet (penalty shoot-out scored); Lalit (penalty shoot-out scored); Abhishek (penalty shoot-out scored); Raj (penalty shoot-out scored); Harmanpreet (penalty shoot-out scored); Sukhjeet (penalty shoot-out scored); Lalit (penalty shoot-out scored)		(penalty shoot-out scored) Basterra; (penalty shoot-out scored) Miralles; (penalty shoot-out scored) Bonastre; (penalty shoot-out scored) Reyné; (penalty shoot-out scored) Recasens; (penalty shoot-out scored) Bonastre; (penalty shoot-out scored) Recasens; (penalty shoot-out missed) Miralles

21 February 2024 2023–24 FIH Pro League	India	1–1 (2–4 p)	Netherlands	Rourkela, India
19:30	Hardik 38'	Report	Middendorp 4'	Stadium: Birsa Munda International Hockey Stadium
	Penalties
	Araijeet (penalty shoot-out scored); Sukhjeet (penalty shoot-out missed); Lalit (penalty shoot-out scored); Shamsher (penalty shoot-out missed)		(penalty shoot-out scored) Croon; (penalty shoot-out scored) T. Brinkman; (penalty shoot-out missed) De Geus; (penalty shoot-out scored) Telgenkamp; (penalty shoot-out scored) De Mol

24 February 2024 2023–24 FIH Pro League	India	2–2 (0–3 p)	Australia	Rourkela, India
19:30	Harmanpreet 20'; Rohidas 29'	Report	Govers 23'; Craig 53'	Stadium: Birsa Munda International Hockey Stadium
	Penalties
	Akashdeep (penalty shoot-out missed); Sukhjeet (penalty shoot-out missed); Lalit (penalty shoot-out missed)		(penalty shoot-out scored) Brand; (penalty shoot-out scored) Ogilvie; (penalty shoot-out scored) De Mol

25 February 2024 2023–24 FIH Pro League	India	4–0	Ireland	Rourkela, India
19:30	Nilakanta 14'; Akashdeep 15'; Gurjant 38'; Jugraj 60'	Report		Stadium: Birsa Munda International Hockey Stadium

6 April 2024 2024 Australia-India Test Series	Australia	5–1	India	Perth, Australia
16:40	Brand 3'; Wickham 20', 38'; Rintala 37'; Ogilvie 57'	Report	Gurjant 47'	Stadium: Perth Hockey Stadium

7 April 2024 2024 Australia-India Test Series	Australia	4–2	India	Perth, Australia
16:40	Hayward 6', 34'; Anderson 42'; Ephraums 45'	Report	Jugraj 9'; Harmanpreet 30'	Stadium: Perth Hockey Stadium

10 April 2024 2024 Australia-India Test Series	Australia	2–1	India	Perth, Australia
17:40	Hayward 44', 49'	Report	Jugraj 41'	Stadium: Perth Hockey Stadium

12 April 2024 2024 Australia-India Test Series	Australia	3–1	India	Perth, Australia
17:40	Hayward 19', 47'; Welch 54'	Report	Harmanpreet 12'	Stadium: Perth Hockey Stadium

13 April 2024 2024 Australia-India Test Series	Australia	3–2	India	Perth, Australia
16:40	Hayward 20'; Williot 38'; Brand 39'	Report	Harmanpreet 4'; Dhami 53'	Stadium: Perth Hockey Stadium

22 May 2024 2023–24 FIH Pro League	India	2–2 (5–4 p)	Argentina	Antwerp, Belgium
14:30	Singh 11'; Lalit 55'	Report	Martínez 20'; Domene 60'	Stadium: Wilrijkse Plein Antwerp
	Penalties
	Singh (penalty shoot-out scored); Singh (penalty shoot-out scored); Pal (penalty shoot-out missed); Abishek (penalty shoot-out scored); Singh (penalty shoot-out scored); Singh (penalty shoot-out scored); Lalit (penalty shoot-out missed)		Casella (penalty shoot-out scored); Toscani (penalty shoot-out scored); Martins (penalty shoot-out scored); Martínez (penalty shoot-out missed); Casella (penalty shoot-out scored); Toscani (penalty shoot-out missed); Capurro (penalty shoot-out missed)

23 May 2024 2023–24 FIH Pro League	Belgium	4–1	India	Antwerp, Belgium
21:00	Denayer 22'; Hendrickx 34', 60'; Charlier 49'	Report	Abhishek 55'	Stadium: Wilrijkse Plein Antwerp

25 May 2024 2023–24 FIH Pro League	Belgium	2–2 (3–1 p)	India	Antwerp, Belgium
16:15	Denayer 30'; Van Aubel 50'	Report	Araijeet 11'; Sukhjeet 57'	Stadium: Wilrijkse Plein Antwerp
	Penalties
	Boccard (penalty shoot-out scored); De Sloover (penalty shoot-out missed); Van Aubel (penalty shoot-out scored); Ghislain (penalty shoot-out scored)		(penalty shoot-out missed) Araijeet; (penalty shoot-out scored) Sukhjeet; (penalty shoot-out missed) Abhishek; (penalty shoot-out missed) Prasad

26 May 2024 2023–24 FIH Pro League	Argentina	4–5	India	Antwerp, Belgium
18:30	Monja 3'; Keenan 24'; Marcucci 54'; Martínez 57'	Report	Araijeet 7'; Gurjant 18'; Harmanpreet 29', 50', 52'	Stadium: Wilrijkse Plein Antwerp

1 June 2024 2023–24 FIH Pro League	Germany	0–3	India	London, England
10:00		Report	Harmanpreet 16'; Sukhjeet 41'; Gurjant 44'	Stadium: Lee Valley Hockey and Tennis Centre

2 June 2024 2023–24 FIH Pro League	Great Britain	3–1	India	London, England
12:15	Bandurak 2', 11'; Calnan 47'	Report	Abhishek 35'	Stadium: Lee Valley Hockey and Tennis Centre

8 June 2024 2023–24 FIH Pro League	India	2–3	Germany	London, England
17:15	Harmanpreet 19'; Sukhjeet 48'	Report	Peillat 2', 33'; Rühr 10'	Stadium: Lee Valley Hockey and Tennis Centre

9 June 2024 2023–24 FIH Pro League	Great Britain	3–2	India	London, England
14:30	Roper 1'; Waller 37'; Forsyth 50'	Report	Sukhjeet 19'; Harmanpreet 36'	Stadium: Lee Valley Hockey and Tennis Centre

27 July 2024 2024 Summer Olympics GS	India	3–2	New Zealand	Paris, France
17:30	Lane 8'; Child 53'	Report	Mandeep 24'; Vivek 34'; Harmanpreet 59'	Stadium: Stade Yves-du-Manoir

29 July 2024 2024 Summer Olympics GS	India	1–1	Argentina	Paris, France
12:45	Harmanpreet 59'	Report	Martínez 22'	Stadium: Stade Yves-du-Manoir

30 July 2024 2024 Summer Olympics GS	Ireland	0–2	India	Paris, France
13:15		Report	Harmanpreet 11', 19'	Stadium: Stade Yves-du-Manoir

1 August 2024 2024 Summer Olympics GS	India	1–2	Belgium	Paris, France
10:00	Abhishek 18'	Report	Stockbroekx 33'; Dohmen 44'	Stadium: Stade Yves-du-Manoir

2 August 2024 2024 Summer Olympics GS	Australia	2–3	India	Paris, France
13:15	Craig 25'; Govers 55'	Report	Abhishek 12'; Harmanpreet 13', 32'	Stadium: Stade Yves-du-Manoir

4 August 2024 2024 Summer Olympics QF	India	1–1 (4–2 p)	Great Britain	Paris, France
13:30	Harmanpreet 22'	Report; Shootout report	Morton 27'	Stadium: Stade Yves-du-Manoir
	Penalties
	Harmanpreet (penalty shoot-out scored); Sukhjeet (penalty shoot-out scored); Lalit (penalty shoot-out scored); Raj (penalty shoot-out scored)		(penalty shoot-out scored) Albery; (penalty shoot-out scored) Wallace; (penalty shoot-out missed) Williamson; (penalty shoot-out missed) Roper

6 August 2024 2024 Summer Olympics SF	Germany	3–2	India	Paris, France
19:00	Peillat 18'; Rühr 27'; Miltkau 54'	Report	Harmanpreet 7'; Sukhjeet 36'	Stadium: Stade Yves-du-Manoir

8 August 2024 2024 Summer Olympics 3P	India	2–1	Spain	Paris, France
14:00	Harmanpreet 30', 33'	Report	Miralles 18'	Stadium: Stade Yves-du-Manoir

8 September 2024 2024 Asian Champions Trophy PR	India	3–0	China	Hulunbuir, China
15:30	Sukhjeet 14'; Uttam 27'; Abhishek 32'	Report		Stadium: Moqi Training Base

9 September 2024 2024 Asian Champions Trophy PR	India	5–1	Japan	Hulunbuir, China
13:15	Sukhjeet 2', 60'; Abhishek 3'; Sanjay 17'; Uttam 54'	Report	Matsumoto 41'	Stadium: Moqi Training Base

11 September 2024 2024 Asian Champions Trophy PR	Malaysia	1–8	India	Hulunbuir, China
13:15	Akhimullah 34'	Report	Raj 3', 25', 33'; Araijeet 6', 39'; Jugraj 7'; Harmanpreet 22'; Uttam 40'	Stadium: Moqi Training Base

12 September 2024 2024 Asian Champions Trophy PR	South Korea	1–3	India	Hulunbuir, China
13:15	Yang 30'	Report	Harmanpreet 9', 43'; Araijeet 8'	Stadium: Moqi Training Base

14 September 2024 2024 Asian Champions Trophy PR	India	2–1	Pakistan	Hulunbuir, China
13:15	Harmanpreet 13', 19'	Report	Nadeem 8'	Stadium: Moqi Training Base

16 September 2024 2024 Asian Champions Trophy SF	India	4–1	South Korea	Hulunbuir, China
15:30	Uttam 13'; Harmanpreet 19', 45'; Jarmanpreet 32'	Report	Yang 33'	Stadium: Moqi Training Base

17 September 2024 2024 Asian Champions Trophy F	China	0–1	India	Hulunbuir, China
15:30		Report	Jugraj 51'	Stadium: Moqi Training Base

23 October 2024 Bilateral series	India	0–2	Germany	New Delhi, India
15:00		Report	Mertgens 4'; Windfeder 30'	Stadium: Major Dhyan Chand National Stadium

24 October 2024 Bilateral series	India	5–3	Germany	New Delhi, India
15:00	Sukhjeet 34', 48'; Harmanpreet 42', 43'; Abhishek 45'	Report	Mazkour 7', 57'; Mertgens 60'	Stadium: Major Dhyan Chand National Stadium

== See also ==
- India women's national field hockey team results (2021–2024)
