= 2024 Men's Asian Champions Trophy =

Asian field hockey tournament

Tournament details
- Host country: China
- City: Hulunbuir
- Dates: 8–17 September
- Teams: 6 (from 1 confederation)
- Venue: Moqi Training Base

Final positions
- Champions: India (5th title)
- Runner-up: China
- Third place: Pakistan

Tournament statistics
- Matches played: 20
- Goals scored: 103 (5.15 per match)
- Top scorer: (South Korea) Yang Ji-hun (9 goals)
- Best player: (India) Harmanpreet Singh
- Best young player: (Pakistan) Hannan Shahid
- Best goalkeeper: (China) Wang Caiyu

The 2024 Men's Asian Champions Trophy (officially known as The Hero Asian Champions Trophy Moqi, China 2024 for sponsorship reasons) was the eighth edition of the Men's Asian Champions Trophy. The hockey tournament consisted of the six best Asian national teams and was organized by the Asian Hockey Federation. The tournament was held in Hulunbuir, China from 8 to 17 September 2024.

India were the defending champions. They defended their title by defeating the hosts China 1–0 in the final to win a record-extending fifth title. Pakistan won the bronze medal by defeating South Korea 5–2.

== Teams ==
Highlighted are the countries that are participating in the 2024 Men's Asian Champions Trophy. Qualified via FIH rankings Qualified via FIH ranking and as hosts

Team	Appearance	Last appearance	Previous best performance
China	6th	2023	4th (2012, 2013)
India	8th	2023	1st (2011, 2016, 2018, 2023)
Japan	8th	2023	2nd (2013, 2021)
Malaysia	7th	2023	2nd (2023)
Pakistan	8th	2023	1st (2012, 2013, 2018)
South Korea	6th	2023	1st (2021)

== Round robin ==
=== Standings ===
Pos	Team	Pld	W	D	L	GF	GA	GD	Pts	Qualification
1	India	5	5	0	0	21	4	+17	15	Semi-finals
2	Pakistan	5	2	2	1	12	8	+4	8	Semi-finals
3	China (H)	5	2	0	3	9	13	−4	6	Semi-finals
4	South Korea	5	1	3	1	14	15	−1	6	Semi-finals
5	Malaysia	5	1	2	2	13	21	−8	5	Fifth place game
6	Japan	5	0	1	4	11	19	−8	1	Fifth place game

Source: FIH
Rules for classification: 1) points; 2) matches won; 3) goal difference; 4) goals for; 5) head-to-head result; 6) field goals for.
(H) Hosts

=== Matches ===
8 September 2024
13:30

South Korea	5–5	Japan
Yang 3', 38', 53'; Kim J. 31'; Kim H. 58'	Report	Kimura 7'; Matsumoto 18'; Chiba 25'; Kawamura 36'; Kawabe 56'

Umpires:
James Unkles (AUS)
Tao Zhinan Tao (CHN)

8 September 2024
15:45

Malaysia	2–2	Pakistan
Faizal 37'; Aiman 56'	Report	Sufyan 24'; Zikriya 32'

Umpires:
Hideki Kinoshita (JPN)
Ben Grant (NZL)

8 September 2024
18:00

India	3–0	China
Sukhjeet 14'; Uttam 27'; Abhishek 32'	Report

Umpires:
Ilanggo Kanabathu (MAS)
You Hyosik (KOR)

9 September 2024
13:30

South Korea	2–2	Pakistan
Hyun 16'; Kim S. 60'	Report	Hannan 60', 60'

Umpires:
Yin Yongbo (CHN)
James Unkles (AUS)

9 September 2024
15:45

India	5–1	Japan
Sukhjeet 2', 60'; Abhishek 3'; Sanjay 17'; Uttam 54'	Report	Matsumoto 41'

Umpires:
You Hyosik (KOR)
Haroon Rashid (PAK)

9 September 2024
18:00

China	4–2	Malaysia
Gao 9', 32'; Lin 40'; Chao 56'	Report	Abu 14'; Faizal 50'

Umpires:
Deepak Joshi (IND)
Hideki Kinoshita (JPN)

11 September 2024
13:30

Pakistan	2–1	Japan
Nadeem 10'; Sufyan 21'	Report	Fujishima 28'

Umpires:
Tao Zhinan Tao (CHN)
Ilanggo Kanabathu (MAS)

11 September 2024
15:45

Malaysia	1–8	India
Akhimullah 34'	Report	Raj 3', 25', 33'; Araijeet 6', 39'; Jugraj 7'; Harmanpreet 22'; Uttam 40'

Umpires:
Ben Grant (NZL)
Yin Yongbo (CHN)

11 September 2024
18:00

China	2–3	South Korea
Gao 14'; Huang 60'	Report	Kim H. 21'; Kim J. 55'; Yang 55'

Umpires:
Haroon Rashid (PAK)
Deepak Joshi (IND)

12 September 2024
13:30

Japan	4–5	Malaysia
Nagayoshi 24', 48'; T. Tanaka 36'; Matsumoto 51'	Report	Syed 12', 40'; Norsyafiq 21'; Syarman 47'; Abu 48'

Umpires:
Deepak Joshi (IND)
Yin Yongbo (CHN)

12 September 2024
15:45

South Korea	1–3	India
Yang 30'	Report	Harmanpreet 9', 43'; Araijeet 8'

Umpires:
Hideki Kinoshita (JPN)
Ilanggo Kanabathu (MAS)

12 September 2024
18:00

Pakistan	5–1	China
Rehman 23'; Nadeem 36', 56'; Hannan 46', 60'	Report	Gao 48'

Umpires:
Ben Grant (NZL)
You Hyosik (KOR)

14 September 2024
13:30

Malaysia	3–3	South Korea
Abu 28'; Norsyafiq 35'; Faizal 55'	Report	Yang 4', 60'; Park C. 42'

Umpires:
Tao Zhinan (CHN)
Deepak Joshi (IND)

14 September 2024
15:45

India	2–1	Pakistan
Harmanpreet 13', 19'	Report	Nadeem 8'

Umpires:
You Hyosik (KOR)
James Unkles (AUS)

14 September 2024
18:00

Japan	0–2	China
	Report	Chen 7'; Chao 25'

Umpires:
Ilanggo Kanabathu (MAS)
Haroon Rashid (PAK)

== Fifth place game ==
16 September 2024
13:00

Malaysia	4–4	Japan
Akhimullah 5'; Faizal 21', 32'; Fitri 47'	Report	Matsumoto 3', 37'; Chiba 24'; S. Tanaka 59'
Penalties
Aiman (penalty shoot-out missed); Faizal (penalty shoot-out scored); Norsyafiq (penalty shoot-out scored); Abu (penalty shoot-out missed)	2–4	(penalty shoot-out scored) Kawabe; (penalty shoot-out missed) Kawahara; (penalty shoot-out scored) Matsumoto; (penalty shoot-out scored) S. Tanaka; (penalty shoot-out scored) T. Tanaka

Umpires:
Haroon Rashid (PAK)
Tao Zhinan (CHN)

== First to fourth place classification ==
=== Bracket ===
Semi-finals
16 September
Pakistan	1 (0)
China (p.s.o.)	1 (2)
16 September
India	4
South Korea	1

Final
17 September
China	0
India	1
Third place
17 September
Pakistan	5
South Korea	2

=== Semi-finals ===
16 September 2024
15:30

Pakistan	1–1	China
Nadeem 37'	Report	Lu 18'
Penalties
Liaqat (penalty shoot-out missed); Nadeem (penalty shoot-out missed); Ahmad (penalty shoot-out missed); Rehman (penalty shoot-out missed)	0–2	(penalty shoot-out scored) Chen; (penalty shoot-out scored) Lin; (penalty shoot-out missed) Lu; (penalty shoot-out missed) E

Umpires:
Deepak Joshi (IND)
You Hyosik (KOR)

16 September 2024
18:00

India	4–1	South Korea
Uttam 13'; Harmanpreet 19', 45'; Jarmanpreet 32'	Report	Yang 33'

Umpires:
James Unkles (AUS)
Hideki Kinoshita (JPN)

=== Third and fourth place ===
17 September 2024
15:30

Pakistan	5–2	South Korea
Sufyan 38', 49'; Hannan 39', 54'; Rooman 45'	Report	Jungjun 16'; Yang 40'

Umpires:
Ilanggo Kanabathu (MAS)
Ben Grant (NZL)

=== Final ===
17 September 2024
18:00

China	0–1	India
	Report	Jugraj 51'

Umpires:
YOU Hyosik (KOR)
UNKLES James (AUS)

== Final rankings ==
Pos	Team
1st place, gold medalist(s)	India (C)
2nd place, silver medalist(s)	China (H)
3rd place, bronze medalist(s)	Pakistan
4	South Korea
5	Japan
6	Malaysia

Source: FIH
(C) Champion; (H) Host

== Statistics ==
=== Goalscorers ===
There were 103 goals scored in 20 matches, for an average of 5.15 goals per match.

9 goals

- (South Korea) Yang Ji-hun

7 goals

- (India) Harmanpreet Singh

6 goals

- (Pakistan) Hannan Shahid
- (Pakistan) Sufyan Khan

5 goals

- (Japan) Kazumasa Matsumoto
- (Malaysia) Faizal Saari
- (Pakistan) Ahmad Nadeem

4 goals

- (China) Gao Jiesheng
- (India) Uttam Singh

3 goals

- (India) Raj Kumar Pal
- (India) Araijeet Singh Hundal
- (India) Sukhjeet Singh
- (India) Jugraj Singh
- (Malaysia) Abu Kamal Azrai

2 goals

- (China) Chao Jieming
- (India) Abhishek Nain
- (Japan) Ken Nagayoshi
- (Japan) Yuki Chiba
- (Malaysia) Syed Cholan
- (Malaysia) Norsyafiq Sumantri
- (Malaysia) Akhimullah Anuar
- (South Korea) Kim Hyeonhong
- (South Korea) Kim Jung-hoo

1 goal

- (China) Huang Ziyang
- (China) Lin Changliang
- (China) Chen Benhai
- (China) Lu Yuanlin
- (India) Sanjay Rana
- (India) Jarmanpreet Singh
- (Japan) Raiki Fujishima
- (Japan) Kosei Kawabe
- (Japan) Yusuke Kawamura
- (Japan) Naru Kimura
- (Japan) Tsubasa Tanaka
- (Japan) Seren Tanaka
- (Malaysia) Syarman Mat
- (Malaysia) Aiman Rozemi
- (Malaysia) Fitri Saari
- (Pakistan) Abdul Rehman
- (Pakistan) Zikriya Hayat
- (Pakistan) Rooman
- (South Korea) Hyun Jig-wang
- (South Korea) Kim Sung-hyun
- (South Korea) Park Cheoleon
- (South Korea) Lee Jung-jun

Source: FIH

== See also ==
- 2024 Women's Asian Champions Trophy
