= Kim Hyeong-jin =

South Korean field hockey player

Personal information
- Born: 14 April 1994 (age 32) South Korea
- Height: 178 cm (5 ft 10 in)

Sport
- Sport: Field hockey
- Position: Midfield
National team
| Years | Team | Caps | Goals |
| 2013–2015 | South Korea U–21 | 11 | (0) |
| 2016– | South Korea | 88 | (7) |
Medal record
Men's field hockey
Representing South Korea
Asian Games
| Bronze medal – third place | 2022 Hangzhou | Team |
Asian Cup
| Gold medal – first place | 2022 Jakarta |
| Silver medal – second place | 2025 Rajgir |
FIH Hockey Series
| Bronze medal – third place | 2018–19 Le Touquet | Team |
Asian Champions Trophy
| Gold medal – first place | 2021 Dhaka |
Sultan Azlan Shah Cup
| Gold medal – first place | 2019 Ipoh |
| Silver medal – second place | 2022 Ipoh |

Kim Hyeong-jin (김형진, born 14 August 1994) is a field hockey player from South Korea, who plays as a midfielder.

== Career ==
=== Under–21 ===
In 2013, Kim was a member of the South Korea U–21 at the FIH Junior World Cup in New Delhi.

=== Senior national team ===
Kim made his senior international debut in 2016.

Throughout his career he has medalled with the national team on numerous occasions, winning gold at the 2021 Asian Champions Trophy in Dhaka, and the 2022 Asian Cup in Jakarta. He also won bronze at the 2018–19 FIH Series Finals in Le Touquet. In addition, he won gold and silver at the 2019 and 2022 editions of the Sultan Azlan Shah Cup, respectively.

In 2023, Kim was named to the national team for the FIH World Cup in Bhubaneswar and Rourkela, as well as the Asian Games in Hangzhou.
