= South Korea national field hockey team =

South Korea national field hockey team may refer to:

- South Korea men's national field hockey team
- South Korea women's national field hockey team
