= Hwang Tae-il =

South Korean field hockey player

Personal information
- Born: 31 October 1991 (age 34) South Korea
- Height: 167 cm (5 ft 6 in)

Sport
- Sport: Field hockey
- Position: Midfield
National team
Years	Team	Caps	Goals
2011	South Korea U–21	2	(1)
2016–	South Korea	98	(10)
Medal record
Men's field hockey
Representing South Korea
Asian Games
Bronze medal – third place	2022 Hangzhou	Team
Asian Cup
Gold medal – first place	2022 Jakarta	Team
FIH Hockey Series
Bronze medal – third place	2018–19 Le Touquet	Team
Asian Champions Trophy
Gold medal – first place	2021 Dhaka	Team
Sultan Azlan Shah Cup
Gold medal – first place	2019 Ipoh	Team
Silver medal – second place	2022 Ipoh	Team
Sultan of Johor Cup
Bronze medal – third place	2011 Johor Bahru	Team

Hwang Tae-il (황태일, born 31 October 1991) is a field hockey player from South Korea, who plays as a midfielder.

== Career ==
=== Under–21 ===
In 2011, Hwang was a member of the South Korea U–21 team at the inaugural edition of the Sultan of Johor Cup in Johor Bahru. At the tournament, he won a bronze medal.

=== Senior national team ===
Hwang made his senior international debut in 2016.

Throughout his career he has medalled with the national team on numerous occasions, winning gold at the 2021 Asian Champions Trophy in Dhaka, and the 2022 Asian Cup in Jakarta. He also won bronze at the 2018–19 FIH Series Finals in Le Touquet. He also won gold and silver at the 2019 and 2022 editions of the Sultan Azlan Shah Cup, respectively.

In 2023, Hwang was named to the national team for the FIH World Cup in Bhubaneswar and Rourkela, as well as the Asian Games in Hangzhou.
