= Jung Man-jae =

South Korean field hockey player

Personal information
- Born: 18 November 1990 (age 35) South Korea
- Height: 176 cm (5 ft 9 in)

Sport
- Sport: Field hockey
- Position: Midfield
National team
Years	Team	Caps	Goals
2011–	South Korea	176	(38)
Medal record
Men's field hockey
Representing South Korea
Asian Games
Bronze medal – third place	2014 Incheon	Team
Bronze medal – third place	2022 Hangzhou	Team
Asian Cup
Gold medal – first place	2013 Ipoh	Team
Gold medal – first place	2022 Jakarta	Team
FIH Hockey Series
Bronze medal – third place	2018–19 Le Touquet	Team
Asian Champions Trophy
Gold medal – first place	2021 Dhaka	Team
Sultan Azlan Shah Cup
Gold medal – first place	2019 Ipoh	Team
Bronze medal – third place	2013 Ipoh	Team
Bronze medal – third place	2014 Ipoh	Team

Jung Man-jae (정만재, born 18 November 1990) is a field hockey player from South Korea, who plays as a forward.

== Career ==
=== Senior national team ===
Jung made his senior international debut in 2011.

In 2014, Jung won a bronze medal at the Asian Games in Incheon.

Throughout his career he has medalled with the national team on numerous occasions, winning gold at the 2013 and 2022 editions of the Asian Cup in Ipoh and Jakarta, respectively, as well as the 2021 Asian Champions Trophy in Dhaka. He also won bronze at the 2018–19 FIH Series Finals in Le Touquet. In addition, he won gold at the 2019 Sultan Azlan Shah Cup, as well as bronze at the 2013 and 2014 editions.

In 2023, Jung was named to the national team for the FIH World Cup in Bhubaneswar and Rourkela, as well as the Asian Games in Hangzhou.
