= South Korea men's national field hockey team =

South Korea
- Association: Korea Hockey Association
- Confederation: AHF (Asia)
- Head Coach: Min Tae-seok
- Assistant coach(es): Kim Jong-yi
- Captain: Lee Jung-jun

FIH ranking
- Current: 20 ▲3 (6 November 2026)
- Highest: 4 (2003)
- Lowest: 23 (March 2026 – present)

Olympic Games
- Appearances: 6 (first in 1988)
- Best result: (silver) 2nd (2000)

World Cup
- Appearances: 7 (first in 1994)
- Best result: 4th (2002, 2006)

Asian Games
- Appearances: 15 (first in 1958)
- Best result: (gold) 1st (1986, 1994, 2002, 2006)

Asia Cup
- Appearances: 11 (first in 1985)
- Best result: (gold) 1st (1993, 1999, 2009, 2013, 2022)
Medal record
| Event | 1st | 2nd | 3rd |
|---|---|---|---|
| Olympic Games | 0 | 1 | 0 |
| Asian Games | 4 | 1 | 3 |
| Asia Cup | 5 | 2 | 3 |
| Champions Trophy | 0 | 1 | 2 |
| Asian Champions Trophy | 1 | 0 | 0 |
| Total | 10 | 5 | 8 |
Olympic Games
| Silver medal – second place | 2000 Sydney | Team |
Asian Games
| Gold medal – first place | 1986 Seoul | Team |
| Gold medal – first place | 1994 Hiroshima | Team |
| Gold medal – first place | 2002 Busan | Team |
| Gold medal – first place | 2006 Doha | Team |
| Silver medal – second place | 1998 Bangkok | Team |
| Bronze medal – third place | 1958 Tokyo | Team |
| Bronze medal – third place | 2014 Incheon | Team |
| Bronze medal – third place | 2022 Hangzhou | Team |
Asia Cup
| Gold medal – first place | 1994 Hiroshima | |
| Gold medal – first place | 1999 Kuala Lumpur | |
| Gold medal – first place | 2009 Kuantan | |
| Gold medal – first place | 2013 Ipoh | |
| Gold medal – first place | 2022 Jakarta | |
| Silver medal – second place | 2007 Chennai | |
| Silver medal – second place | 2025 Rajgir | |
| Bronze medal – third place | 1985 Dhaka | |
| Bronze medal – third place | 1989 New Delhi | |
| Bronze medal – third place | 2003 Kuala Lumpur | |
Champions Trophy
| Silver medal – second place | 1999 Brisbane | |
| Bronze medal – third place | 2000 Amstelveen | |
| Bronze medal – third place | 2009 Melbourne | |
Champions Challenge
| Gold medal – first place | 2014 Kuantan | |
| Silver medal – second place | 2003 Johannesburg | |
| Silver medal – second place | 2005 Alexandria | |
| Silver medal – second place | 2012 Quilmes | |
Asian Champions Trophy
| Gold medal – first place | 2021 Dhaka | |

The South Korea men's national field hockey team (recognized as Korea by FIH) represents South Korea in international field hockey competitions.

Their best result in the global stage was a silver at the 2000 Summer Olympics in Sydney. South Korea is consistently ranked as one of the best teams in Asia.

== Tournament record ==
=== Summer Olympics ===
Summer Olympics record
| Year | Host | Position | Pld | W | D | L | GF | GA | Squad |
|---|---|---|---|---|---|---|---|---|---|
| 1908 to 1984 | | did not participate | | | | | | | |
| 1988 | Seoul, South Korea | 10th | 7 | 1 | 2 | 4 | 10 | 14 | Squad |
| 1992 | Barcelona, Spain | did not qualify | | | | | | | |
| 1996 | Atlanta, United States | 5th | 7 | 2 | 3 | 2 | 18 | 17 | Squad |
| 2000 | Sydney, Australia | 2nd | 7 | 3 | 3 | 1 | 13 | 10 | Squad |
| 2004 | Athens, Greece | 8th | 7 | 2 | 2 | 3 | 22 | 17 | Squad |
| 2008 | Beijing, China | 6th | 6 | 2 | 1 | 3 | 15 | 16 | Squad |
| 2012 | (United Kingdom) London, Great Britain | 8th | 6 | 2 | 0 | 4 | 11 | 11 | Squad |
| 2016 | Rio de Janeiro, Brazil | did not qualify | | | | | | | |
| 2020 | Tokyo, Japan | did not qualify | | | | | | | |
| 2024 | Paris, France | did not qualify | | | | | | | |
| 2028 | Los Angeles, United States | to be determined | | | | | | | |
| 2032 | Brisbane, Australia | to be determined | | | | | | | |
| Total | | 2nd place | 40 | 12 | 11 | 17 | 89 | 85 | |

=== World Cup ===
World Cup record
| Year | Host | Position | Pld | W | D | L | GF | GA | Squad |
|---|---|---|---|---|---|---|---|---|---|
| 1971 to 1990 | | did not qualify | | | | | | | |
| 1994 | Sydney, Australia | 8th | 7 | 1 | 3 | 3 | 14 | 15 | —N/a |
| 1998 | Utrecht, Netherlands | 7th | 7 | 2 | 1 | 4 | 14 | 18 | Squad |
| 2002 | Kuala Lumpur, Malaysia | 4th | 9 | 5 | 0 | 4 | 23 | 16 | Squad |
| 2006 | Mönchengladbach, Germany | 4th | 7 | 3 | 2 | 2 | 12 | 12 | Squad |
| 2010 | New Delhi, India | 6th | 6 | 3 | 1 | 2 | 16 | 10 | Squad |
| 2014 | The Hague, Netherlands | 10th | 6 | 0 | 1 | 5 | 3 | 18 | Squad |
| 2018 | Bhubaneswar, India | did not qualify | | | | | | | |
| 2023 | Odisha, India | 8th | 5 | 1 | 1 | 3 | 10 | 23 | Squad |
| 2026 | Wavre, Belgium; Amstelveen, Netherlands | did not qualify | | | | | | | |
| Total | | 4th place | 47 | 15 | 9 | 23 | 92 | 112 | |

=== Asian Games ===
Asian Games record
| Year | Host | Position | Pld | W | D | L | GF | GA | Squad |
|---|---|---|---|---|---|---|---|---|---|
| 1958 | Tokyo, Japan | 3rd | 4 | 2 | 0 | 2 | 6 | 13 | Squad |
| 1962 | Jakarta, Indonesia | 8th | 3 | 0 | 0 | 3 | 1 | 12 | —N/a |
| 1966 | Bangkok, Thailand | 6th | 5 | 2 | 0 | 3 | 2 | 4 | —N/a |
| 1970 | Bangkok, Thailand | Withdrew | | | | | | | |
| 1974 | Tehran, Iran | did not participate | | | | | | | |
| 1978 | Bangkok, Thailand | did not participate | | | | | | | |
| 1982 | New Delhi, India | 5th | 5 | 3 | 0 | 2 | 12 | 19 | —N/a |
| 1986 | Seoul, South Korea | 1st | 6 | 5 | 1 | 0 | 29 | 3 | Squad |
| 1990 | Beijing, China | 4th | 6 | 3 | 0 | 3 | 14 | 11 | —N/a |
| 1994 | Hiroshima, Japan | 1st | 5 | 3 | 1 | 1 | 20 | 7 | Squad |
| 1998 | Bangkok, Thailand | 2nd | 6 | 4 | 1 | 1 | 33 | 6 | Squad |
| 2002 | Busan, South Korea | 1st | 5 | 4 | 1 | 0 | 25 | 5 | Squad |
| 2006 | Doha, Qatar | 1st | 6 | 5 | 1 | 0 | 28 | 3 | Squad |
| 2010 | Guangzhou, China | 4th | 6 | 3 | 2 | 1 | 26 | 6 | Squad |
| 2014 | Incheon, South Korea | 3rd | 6 | 5 | 0 | 1 | 28 | 4 | Squad |
| 2018 | Jakarta, Indonesia | 5th | 6 | 4 | 0 | 2 | 46 | 8 | Squad |
| 2022 | Huangzhou, China | 3rd | 7 | 5 | 0 | 2 | 47 | 14 | Squad |
| 2026 | Aichi and Nagoya, Japan | 4th | 7 | 4 | 0 | 3 | 24 | 17 | Squad |
| 2030 | Doha, Qatar | to be determined | | | | | | | |
| 2034 | Riyadh, Saudi Arabia | to be determined | | | | | | | |
| Total | | 1st place | 83 | 52 | 7 | 24 | 341 | 133 | |

=== Asia Cup ===
Asia Cup record
| Year | Host | Position | Pld | W | D | L | GF | GA |
|---|---|---|---|---|---|---|---|---|
| 1982 | Karachi, Pakistan | Did not participate | | | | | | |
| 1985 | Dhaka, Bangladesh | 3rd | 6 | 3 | 1 | 2 | 19 | 17 |
| 1989 | New Delhi, India | 3rd | 5 | 3 | 0 | 2 | 16 | 14 |
| 1994 | Hiroshima, Japan | 1st | 6 | 4 | 2 | 0 | 13 | 3 |
| 1999 | Kuala Lumpur, Malaysia | 1st | 6 | 5 | 0 | 1 | 29 | 10 |
| 2003 | Kuala Lumpur, Malaysia | 3rd | 5 | 3 | 1 | 1 | 20 | 8 |
| 2007 | Chennai, India | 2nd | 7 | 4 | 1 | 2 | 45 | 16 |
| 2009 | Kuantan, Malaysia | 1st | 5 | 4 | 1 | 0 | 19 | 4 |
| 2013 | Ipoh, Malaysia | 1st | 5 | 4 | 0 | 1 | 25 | 6 |
| 2017 | Dhaka, Bangladesh | 4th | 7 | 2 | 3 | 2 | 18 | 14 |
| 2022 | Jakarta, Indonesia | 1st | 7 | 4 | 2 | 1 | 24 | 15 |
| 2025 | Rajgir, India | 2nd | 7 | 3 | 1 | 3 | 20 | 17 |
| Total | | 1st place | 66 | 39 | 12 | 15 | 248 | 124 |

=== Asian Champions Trophy ===
Asian Champions Trophy record
| Year | Host | Position | Pld | W | D | L | GF | GA |
|---|---|---|---|---|---|---|---|---|
| 2011 | Ordos City, China | 5th | 6 | 3 | 1 | 2 | 15 | 17 |
| 2012 | Doha, Qatar | did not participate | | | | | | |
| 2013 | Kakamigahara, Japan | did not participate | | | | | | |
| 2016 | Kuantan, Malaysia | 4th | 7 | 2 | 4 | 1 | 14 | 12 |
| 2018 | Muscat, Oman | 5th | 6 | 2 | 0 | 4 | 11 | 16 |
| 2021 | Dhaka, Bangladesh | 1st | 6 | 2 | 4 | 0 | 20 | 18 |
| 2023 | Chennai, India | 4th | 7 | 1 | 2 | 4 | 11 | 18 |
| 2024 | Hulunbuir, China | 4th | 7 | 1 | 3 | 3 | 17 | 24 |
| 2026 | Punjab, India | 4th | 7 | 2 | 0 | 5 | 13 | 28 |
| Total | | 1st place | 46 | 13 | 14 | 19 | 121 | 133 |

=== Nations Cup ===
FIH Hockey Nations Cup record
| Year | Host | Position | Pld | W | D | L | GF | GA |
|---|---|---|---|---|---|---|---|---|
| 2022 | Potchefstroom, South Africa | 3rd | 5 | 4 | 1 | 0 | 15 | 4 |
| 2023–24 | Gniezno, Poland | 6th | 6 | 2 | 0 | 4 | 12 | 13 |
| 2024–25 | Kuala Lumpur, Malaysia | 4th | 5 | 2 | 2 | 1 | 14 | 13 |
| 2025–26 | Cape Town, South Africa | 9th | 4 | 0 | 1 | 3 | 6 | 13 |
| 2026–27 | Lahore, Pakistan | Qualified | | | | | | |
| Total | | 3rd place | 20 | 8 | 4 | 8 | 47 | 43 |

=== Sultan Azlan Shah Cup ===
Sultan Azlan Shah Cup record
| Year | Position |
|---|---|
| 1987 | 5th |
| 1991 | 6th |
| 1994 | 5th |
| 1996 | 1st |
| 1998 | 3rd |
| 1999 | 2nd |
| 2000 | 2nd |
| 2001 | 2nd |
| 2003 | 4th |
| 2004 | 3rd |
| 2005 | 2nd |
| 2006 | 6th |
| 2007 | 4th |
| 2010 | 1st |
| 2011 | 5th |
| 2012 | 5th |
| 2013 | 3rd |
| 2014 | 3rd |
| 2015 | 4th |
| 2019 | 1st |
| 2020 | Cancelled |
| 2022 | 2nd |
| 2024 | 5th |
| 2025 | 6th |
| 2026 | |
Best result: 1st place

=== Defunct competitions ===
==== Champions Trophy ====
Champions Trophy record
| Year | Host | Position | Pld | W | D | L | GF | GA |
|---|---|---|---|---|---|---|---|---|
| 1978 to 1996 | | did not participate | | | | | | |
| 1997 | Adelaide, Australia | 6th | 6 | 1 | 0 | 5 | 10 | 15 |
| 1998 | Lahore, Pakistan | 4th | 6 | 2 | 3 | 1 | 15 | 15 |
| 1999 | Brisbane, Australia | 2nd | 6 | 2 | 2 | 2 | 13 | 14 |
| 2000 | Amstelveen, Netherlands | 3rd | 6 | 3 | 0 | 3 | 8 | 7 |
| 2001 | Rotterdam, Netherlands | 6th | 6 | 0 | 1 | 5 | 11 | 20 |
| 2002 | Cologne, Germany | 6th | 6 | 2 | 0 | 4 | 11 | 17 |
| 2003 to 2006 | | did not participate | | | | | | |
| 2007 | Kuala Lumpur, Malaysia | 4th | 8 | 3 | 3 | 2 | 20 | 16 |
| 2008 | Rotterdam, Netherlands | 6th | 6 | 1 | 0 | 5 | 15 | 26 |
| 2009 | Melbourne, Australia | 3rd | 6 | 3 | 1 | 2 | 18 | 9 |
| 2010 | Mönchengladbach, Germany | did not participate | | | | | | |
| 2011 | Auckland, New Zealand | 8th | 6 | 0 | 1 | 5 | 13 | 26 |
| 2012 | Melbourne, Australia | did not participate | | | | | | |
| 2014 | Bhubaneswar, India | did not participate | | | | | | |
| 2016 | (United Kingdom) London, Great Britain | 6th | 6 | 1 | 0 | 5 | 9 | 21 |
| 2018 | Breda, Netherlands | did not participate | | | | | | |
| Total | | 2nd place | 68 | 18 | 11 | 39 | 143 | 185 |

==== Champions Challenge I ====
Champions Challenge I record
| Year | Host | Position | Pld | W | D | L | GF | GA |
|---|---|---|---|---|---|---|---|---|
| 2001 | Kuala Lumpur, Malaysia | did not participate | | | | | | |
| 2003 | Johannesburg, South Africa | 2nd | 6 | 3 | 1 | 2 | 19 | 11 |
| 2005 | Alexandria, Egypt | 2nd | 6 | 4 | 1 | 1 | 24 | 14 |
| 2007 to 2011 | | did not participate | | | | | | |
| 2012 | Quilmes, Argentina | 2nd | 6 | 3 | 0 | 3 | 17 | 19 |
| 2014 | Kuantan, Malaysia | 1st | 6 | 5 | 1 | 0 | 20 | 8 |
| Total | | 1st place | 24 | 15 | 3 | 6 | 80 | 52 |

==== Hockey World League and FIH Series ====
Hockey World League and FIH Series record
| Season | Position | Round | Pld | W | D | L | GF | GA |
|---|---|---|---|---|---|---|---|---|
| 2012–13 | 9th | Semifinal | 6 | 1 | 1 | 4 | 9 | 19 |
| 2014–15 | 13th | Semifinal | 7 | 3 | 2 | 2 | 19 | 18 |
| 2016–17 | 17th | Semifinal | 5 | 1 | 0 | 4 | 11 | 18 |
| 2018–19 | —N/a | Finals | 6 | 3 | 2 | 1 | 21 | 10 |
| Total | Best: 9th | Semifinal | 24 | 8 | 5 | 11 | 60 | 65 |

== Current roster ==
The following players were named in the squad for the 2022 Asian Games.

Caps and goals current as of 24 September 2023, following the game against Indonesia.

Head coach: Sin Seok-gyo

| No. | Pos. | Player | Date of birth (age) | Caps | Goals | Club |
|---|---|---|---|---|---|---|
| 1 | GK | Kim Jae-hyeon | 6 March 1988 (age 38) | 187 | 0 | (South Korea) Seongnam City Hall |
| 31 | GK | Kang Young-bin | 6 May 1996 (age 30) | 5 | 0 | |
| 6 | DF | Lee Nam-yong (C) | 28 September 1983 (age 43) | 301 | 95 | (South Korea) Seongnam City Hall |
| 14 | DF | Park Cheoleon | 2 November 1998 (age 28) | 20 | 3 | (South Korea) Seongnam City Hall |
| 15 | DF | Lee Hye-seung | 22 June 1999 (age 27) | 33 | 1 | (South Korea) Armed Forces Athletics Corps |
| 21 | DF | Lee Seung-hoon | 20 March 1985 (age 41) | 171 | 4 | (South Korea) Armed Forces Athletics Corps |
| 32 | DF | Lee Ju-young | 24 December 1993 (age 32) | 39 | 0 | (South Korea) Seongnam City Hall |
| 7 | MF | Jung Man-jae | 18 November 1990 (age 36) | 176 | 38 | (South Korea) Incheon City Sports Council |
| 10 | MF | Hwang Tae-il | 31 October 1991 (age 35) | 97 | 10 | (South Korea) Seongnam City Hall |
| 13 | MF | Ji Woo-cheon | 13 April 1994 (age 32) | 68 | 5 | (South Korea) Seongnam City Hall |
| 18 | MF | Kim Sung-hyun | 26 August 1994 (age 32) | 38 | 7 | (South Korea) Seongnam City Hall |
| 24 | MF | Kim Hyeong-jin | 14 April 1994 (age 32) | 88 | 7 | (South Korea) Incheon City Sports Council |
| 25 | MF | Jang Jong-hyun | 28 March 1984 (age 42) | 322 | 256 | (South Korea) Seongnam City Hall |
| 8 | FW | Son Da-in | 17 May 1999 (age 27) | 8 | 1 | (South Korea) International University |
| 9 | FW | Kim Jung-hoo | 31 December 1991 (age 34) | 86 | 19 | (South Korea) Incheon City Sports Council |
| 11 | FW | Lee Jung-jun | 17 May 1991 (age 35) | 130 | 31 | (South Korea) Seongnam City Hall |
| 19 | FW | Jeong Jun-woo | 2 April 1993 (age 33) | 59 | 10 | (South Korea) Gimhae City Hall |
| 33 | FW | Yang Ji-hun | 20 August 1991 (age 35) | 97 | 31 | (South Korea) Gimhae City Hall |

== Results and fixtures ==
The following is a list of match results in the last 12 months, as well as any future matches that have been scheduled.

Win Draw Loss Fixture

=== 2026 ===
==== 2026 FIH World Cup Qualifiers ====
| 01 March 2026 GS | South Korea | 2–3 | Poland | Santiago, Chile |
| 14:15 | Lim 27'; Oh 45' | Report | Jarzyński 31', 51'; Lange 53' | Stadium: Estadio Nacional del Hockey Césped Claudia Schüler |

| 03 March 2026 GS | South Korea | 1–6 | Ireland | Santiago, Chile |
| 11:15 | Jang 15' | Report | Williams 14'; Cole 27', 56'; Nelson 28'; Louis Rowe 42', 48' | Stadium: Estadio Nacional del Hockey Césped Claudia Schüler |

| 04 March 2026 GS | Canada | 7–2 | South Korea | Santiago, Chile |
| 11:15 | Sarmento 7'; Childs 19'; Thind 22'; Davis 39', 53'; Harris 49'; Nicholson 58' | Report | Choi 7'; Jang J. 47' | Stadium: Estadio Nacional del Hockey Césped Claudia Schüler |

| 06 March 2026 Crossover | Scotland | 8–2 | South Korea | Santiago, Chile |
| 12:45 | J. Golden 3', 35', 52'; Walker 4', 5', 18', 49'; McConnell 43' | Report | Lim 11'; Cheon 13' | Stadium: Estadio Nacional del Hockey Césped Claudia Schüler |

| 07 March 2026 Seventh and eighth place | South Korea | 0–0 (1–4 p) | Chile | Santiago, Chile |
| 13:30 | | Report | | Stadium: Estadio Nacional del Hockey Césped Claudia Schüler |
| | Penalties |
| | Rim (penalty shoot-out missed); Bae (penalty shoot-out missed); Jin (penalty shoot-out scored) | | (penalty shoot-out scored) Hurtado; (penalty shoot-out scored) Labbe; (penalty shoot-out scored) J. Amoroso; (penalty shoot-out scored) Gesswein |

==== Test matches ====
| 11 April 2026 Test 1 | Japan | 1–2 | South Korea | Tokyo, Japan |
| 13:00 | Kawabe 3' | Report | Yang 57'; Son 58' | Stadium: Oi Hockey Stadium |

| 12 April 2026 Test 2 | Japan | 2–3 | South Korea | Tokyo, Japan |
| 15:30 | Kimura 5'; Matsumoto 32' | Report | Son 11'; Bae 48'; Kim 57' | Stadium: Oi Hockey Stadium |

==== 2026 FIH Nations Cup ====
| 11 June 2026 Pool A | South Korea | 1–1 | Japan | Cape Town, South Africa |
| 14:30 | Lim 27' | Report | T. Tanaka 37' | Stadium: Hartleyvale Stadium |

| 14 June 2026 Pool A | South Korea | 2–6 | New Zealand | Cape Town, South Africa |
| 17:00 | Lim 12'; Jang 44' | Report | Russell 31', 52'; Boyde 34'; Thomas 47', 59'; Culhane 55' | Stadium: Hartleyvale Stadium |

| 16 June 2026 Pool A | Scotland | 4–2 | South Korea | Cape Town, South Africa |
| 14:30 | J. Golden 5', 41'; Gilmour 34'; C. Golden 55' | Report | Lee G. 20'; Park 59' | Stadium: Hartleyvale Stadium |

| 17 June 2026 Pool A | South Korea | 1–2 | Malaysia | Cape Town, South Africa |
| 16:45 | Gang-san 20' | Report | Anuar 5'; Silverius 58' | Stadium: Hartleyvale Stadium |

==== Test matches ====
| 30 July 2026 Test 1 | Pakistan | 3–1 | South Korea | Islamabad, Pakistan |
| 17:15 | Khan 21', 37'; Mahmood 30' | Report | Yang 26' | Stadium: Naseer Bunda Hockey Stadium |

| 1 August 2026 Test 2 | Pakistan | 3–1 | South Korea | Islamabad, Pakistan |
| 17:15 | Butt 33'; Mahmood 52', 60' | Report | Son 30' | Stadium: Naseer Bunda Hockey Stadium |

==== 2026 Asian Games ====
| 18 September 2026 Pool A | South Korea | 5–0 | Bangladesh | Kakamigahara, Japan |
| 11:00 | Bae 21'; Oh 21'; Lee 30'; Yang 32'; Sim 58' | Report | | Stadium: Gifu Prefectural Green Stadium |

| 22 September 2026 Pool A | Indonesia | 0–5 | South Korea | Kakamigahara, Japan |
| 11:00 | | Report | Lim Do. 11', 23', 40', 42'; Kim. H 33' | Stadium: Gifu Prefectural Green Stadium |

| 24 September 2026 Pool A | South Korea | 2–8 | India | Kakamigahara, Japan |
| 15:00 | Kim J. 42'; Kim Y. 52' | Report | Lakra 4'; Sukhjeet 10'; Harmanpreet 11'; Abhishek 15', 38'; Dilpreet 26', 32'; Rajinder 60' | Stadium: Gifu Prefectural Green Stadium |

| 26 September 2026 Pool A | Sri Lanka | 0–5 | South Korea | Kakamigahara, Japan |
| 15:00 | | Report | Park 29'; Son 50'; Lim Do. 54', 58'; Yang 55' | Stadium: Gifu Prefectural Green Stadium |

| 28 September 2026 Pool A | South Korea | 3–2 | Japan | Kakamigahara, Japan |
| 17:00 | Yang 29', 42'; Rim 52' | Report | Yamasaki 4'; Fujishima 60' | Stadium: Gifu Prefectural Green Stadium |

| 1 October 2026 Semi-final | Malaysia | 2–1 | South Korea | Kakamigahara, Japan |
| 19:00 | Azrai 40', 45' | Report | Lee G. 42' | Stadium: Gifu Prefectural Green Stadium |

| 3 October 2026 Bronze medal match | Pakistan | 5–3 | South Korea | Kakamigahara, Japan |
| 16:30 | Khan 4'; Abdul 30'; Rana 52', 54'; Shahid 59' | Report | Lee G. 12'; Kim Y. 18'; Yang 25' | Stadium: Gifu Prefectural Green Stadium |

==== 2026 Asian Champions Trophy ====
| 27 October 2026 Group Stage | Japan | 3–2 | South Korea | Jalandhar, India |
| 15:15 | Fukuda 14'; Ooka 36'; Matsumoto 52' | Report | Han 15'; Jeong 59' | Stadium: Surjit Hockey Stadium |

| 29 October 2026 Group Stage | Malaysia | 3–1 | South Korea | Jalandhar, India |
| 14:30 | Kamaruddin 10'; Anuar 36'; Fa. Saari 50' | Report | Song. H 31' | Stadium: Surjit Hockey Stadium |

| 30 October 2026 Group Stage | South Korea | 2–1 | China | Jalandhar, India |
| 16:45 | Kim. Y 35'; Kim. J 36' | Report | Chen. C 8' | Stadium: Surjit Hockey Stadium |

| 1 November 2026 Group Stage | South Korea | 5–0 | Bangladesh | Jalandhar, India |
| 14:30 | Park 7', 34'; Son 17', 32', 51' | Report | | Stadium: Surjit Hockey Stadium |

| 2 November 2026 Group Stage | India | 8–0 | South Korea | Jalandhar, India |
| 19:00 | Dilpreet 8', 40'; Jugraj 11'; Harmanpreet 15'; Lakra 33'; Sukhjeet 34'; Sanjay 36'; Angad 60' | Report | | Stadium: Surjit Hockey Stadium |

| 4 November 2026 Semi-final | India | 8–1 | South Korea | Mohali, India |
| 19:00 | Lakra 4', 13'; Harmanpreet 9'; Sukhjeet 21'; Dilpreet 21', 25'; Angad 36'; Prasad 54' | Report | Han 9' | Stadium: Olympian Balbir Singh Senior International Hockey Stadium |

| 5 November 2026 Bronze medal match | South Korea | 2–5 | Malaysia | Mohali, India |
| 16:00 | Park 5'; Chun 13' | Report | Fi. Saari 2'; Fa. Saari 34'; Azrai 45', 50'; Jalil 58' | Stadium: Olympian Balbir Singh Senior International Hockey Stadium |

==== Sultan Azlan Shah Cup ====
| 20 November 2026 Round Robin | Malaysia | 3–0 | South Korea | Ipoh, Malaysia |
| 19:30 | Azrai 36'; Kamaruddin 38'; Fa. Saari 56' | Report | | Stadium: Azlan Shah Stadium |

| 21 November 2026 Round Robin | Australia | 7–1 | South Korea | Ipoh, Malaysia |
| 17:15 | Jackson 8', 39'; Ephraums 17'; Geddes 20'; Grobbelaar 27'; Burns 50'; Hawthorne 53' | Report | Kong 4' | Stadium: Azlan Shah Stadium |

| 23 November 2026 Round Robin | Canada | v | South Korea | Ipoh, Malaysia |
| 15:00 | | | | Stadium: Azlan Shah Stadium |

| 24 November 2026 Round Robin | South Korea | v | Pakistan | Ipoh, Malaysia |
| 15:00 | | | | Stadium: Azlan Shah Stadium |

| 26 November 2026 Round Robin | South Korea | v | United States | Ipoh, Malaysia |
| 17:15 | | | | Stadium: Azlan Shah Stadium |

== See also ==
- South Korea men's national under-21 field hockey team
