= 2018–19 Men's FIH Series Finals =

Tournament details
- Dates: 26 April – 23 June 2019
- Teams: 24 (from 4 confederations)
- Venue: 3 (in 3 host cities)

Tournament statistics
- Matches played: 60
- Goals scored: 311 (5.18 per match)
- Top scorer(s): (India) Varun Kumar (India) Harmanpreet Singh (Russia) Semen Matkovskiy (6 goals)

The Men's FIH Series Finals 2019 was the final stage of the 2018–19 edition of the Hockey Series. It was held from April to June 2019.

The International Hockey Federation (FIH) confirmed that Malaysia, India and France would host FIH Series Finals in 2019. The top two teams from each event qualified for the 2019 Men's FIH Olympic Qualifiers.

== Qualification ==
The following 24 teams, shown with pre-tournament World Rankings as of December 2018, when the pools were composed, qualified for the FIH Series Finals.

Dates	Event	Location	Quotas	Qualifier(s)
Nine highest ranked nations in the FIH World Rankings not playing in the FIH Pro League			9	Canada (10); China (14); France (15); India (5); Ireland (11); Japan (18); Malaysia (13); South Africa (16); South Korea (17)
5–10 June 2018	2018–19 Hockey Series Open	Salamanca, Mexico	2	United States (26); Mexico (39)
23 June – 1 July 2018	2018–19 Hockey Series Open	Singapore	1	Singapore (40); ~~Thailand~~
25–30 June 2018	2018–19 Hockey Series Open	Zagreb, Croatia	2	Austria (19); Wales (24)
15–18 August 2018	2018–19 Hockey Series Open	Port Vila, Vanuatu	0	~~Vanuatu~~ (65)
28 August – 2 September 2018	2018–19 Hockey Series Open	Gniezno, Poland	2	Poland (21); Italy (37)
4–9 September 2018	2018–19 Hockey Series Open	Lousada, Portugal	2	Russia (23); Scotland (22)
18–23 September 2018	2018–19 Hockey Series Open	Santiago, Chile	2	Chile (34); Brazil (27)
7–9 December 2018	2018–19 Hockey Series Open	Bulawayo, Zimbabwe	1	Egypt (20)
17–22 December 2018	2018–19 Hockey Series Open	Lahore, Pakistan	1	Uzbekistan (55)
21 January 2019	Appointed by the FIH		2	Ukraine (25) (Note: Ukraine qualified as the highest ranked nation not already qualified via the other two routes); Belarus (31) (Note: Belarus replaced Vanuatu)
Total			24	

== Kuala Lumpur ==
FIH Series Finals Kuala Lumpur
Tournament details
- Host country: Malaysia
- City: Kuala Lumpur
- Dates: 26 April – 4 May
- Teams: 8
- Venue: National Hockey Stadium

Final positions
- Champions: Canada
- Runner-up: Malaysia
- Third place: Italy

Tournament statistics
- Matches played: 20
- Goals scored: 93 (4.65 per match)
- Top scorer: (Malaysia) Tengku Ahmad Tajuddin (4 goals)
- Best player: (Malaysia) Tengku Ahmad Tajuddin

All times are local (UTC+8).

=== First round ===
==== Pool A ====
Pos	Team	Pld	W	D	L	GF	GA	GD	Pts	
1	Austria	3	2	0	1	8	2	+6	6	Semi-finals
2	Canada	3	2	0	1	9	6	+3	6	Cross-overs
3	Wales	3	2	0	1	5	4	+1	6	Cross-overs
4	Belarus	3	0	0	3	3	13	−10	0	Seventh place game

Source: FIH
Rules for classification: 1) points; 2) matches won; 3) goal difference; 4) goals for; 5) head-to-head result; 6) field goals scored.

26 April 2019
14:05

Austria	5–0	Belarus
Lindengrün 10'; Uher 11'; Bele 41'; Unterkircher 48'; Thörmblom 57'	Report

Umpires:
Saleh Al-Balushi (OMA)
Michihiko Watanabe (JPN)

26 April 2019
16:05

Canada	1–3	Wales
I. Smythe 42'	Report	Carson 30'; Hawker 33'; Naughalty 57'

Umpires:
Ben De Young (AUS)
Reinier Diaz (CUB)

27 April 2019
18:05

Austria	1–2	Canada
Thörnblom 53'	Report	Wallace 31'; K. Pereira 42'

Umpires:
Sébastien Michielsen (BEL)
Dave Dowdall (ENG)

27 April 2019
20:05

Wales	2–1	Belarus
G. Furlong 13', 54'	Report	Belavusau 42'

Umpires:
Johannes Berneth (GER)
Ben De Young (AUS)

29 April 2019
14:05

Canada	6–2	Belarus
Bissett 20', 21'; Scholfield 32'; Wallace 41'; I. Smythe 42'; Tupper 60'	Report	Bandarchuck 40'; Yahoshchankau 52'

Umpires:
Federico García (URU)
Hugo Romero (PAR)

29 April 2019
16:05

Wales	0–2	Austria
	Report	Uher 37'; Steyrer 55'

Umpires:
Michihiko Watanabe (JPN)
Johannes Berneth (GER)

==== Pool B ====
Pos	Team	Pld	W	D	L	GF	GA	GD	Pts	
1	Italy	3	3	0	0	9	3	+6	9	Semi-finals
2	Malaysia (H)	3	1	1	1	12	8	+4	4	Cross-overs
3	China	3	1	1	1	8	8	0	4	Cross-overs
4	Brazil	3	0	0	3	2	12	−10	0	Seventh place game

Source: FIH
Rules for classification: 1) points; 2) matches won; 3) goal difference; 4) goals for; 5) head-to-head result; 6) field goals scored.
(H) Hosts

26 April 2019
18:05

China	1–2	Italy
Tu 29'	Report	Jul. Montone 9'; Nunez 49'

Umpires:
Federico García (URU)
Ilango Kanabathu (MAS)

26 April 2019
20:05

Malaysia	6–0	Brazil
Norsyafiq 32'; Najmi 38'; Fitri 48'; Meor 53'; Azrai 54'; Razie 56'	Report

Umpires:
Hugo Romero (PAR)
Dave Dowdall (ENG)

28 April 2019
18:05

Brazil	0–3	Italy
	Report	Jul. Montone 9', 36'; Amorsini 47'

Umpires:
Saleh Al-Balushi (OMA)
Ilanggo Kanabathu (MAS)

28 April 2019
20:05

China	4–4	Malaysia
Lin 43'; Ao W. 51'; Du T. 54'; Dong 59'	Report	Fitri 4'; Firhan 34'; Tengku 53', 57'

Umpires:
Sébastien Michielsen (BEL)
Johannes Berneth (GER)

29 April 2019
18:05

Brazil	2–3	China
Y. van der Heijden 7'; Lopez 10'	Report	Su 13'; Tu 45'; Dong 56'

Umpires:
Ben De Young (AUS)
Reinier Diaz (CUB)

29 April 2019
20:05

Malaysia	2–4	Italy
Faizal 26'; Razie 35'	Report	Keenan 9'; Nunez 31', 43'; Sior 45'

Umpires:
Dave Dowdall (ENG)
Sébastien Michielsen (BEL)

=== Second round ===
Cross-overs
1 May
Malaysia	2
Wales	1
1 May
Canada (p.s.o.)	3 (3)
China	3 (1)

Semi-finals
3 May
Austria	1
Malaysia	3
3 May
Italy	1
Canada	3

Final
4 May
Malaysia	2
Canada	3
Third place
4 May
Austria	1
Italy	2

==== Cross-overs ====
1 May 2019
17:50

Canada	3–3	China
Scholfield 16'; I. Smythe 47'; S. Panesar 51'	Report	Du T. 4'; Tu 45+'; Su 50'
Penalties
Pearson (penalty shoot-out scored); Johnston (penalty shoot-out missed); S. Panesar (penalty shoot-out scored); K. Pereira (penalty shoot-out scored)	3–1	(penalty shoot-out scored) Dong; (penalty shoot-out missed) Su; (penalty shoot-out missed) Lin; (penalty shoot-out missed) Guo Z.

Umpires:
Michihiko Watanabe (JPN)
Ilango Kanabathu (MAS)

1 May 2019
20:05

Malaysia	2–1	Wales
Tengku 27'; Faizal 40'	Report	Hawker 56'

Umpires:
Federico García (URU)
Hugo Romero (PAR)

==== Seventh and eighth place ====
2 May 2019
17:50

Belarus	3–4	Brazil
Hancharou 21'; Belavusau 26'; Kadran 35'	Report	Borges 26'; De Grandis 29'; Assis 34'; Paixão 52'

Umpires:
Saleh Al-Balushi (OMA)
Michihiko Watanabe (JPN)

==== Fifth and sixth place ====
2 May 2019
20:05

China	2–3	Wales
Dong 3'; Su 50'	Report	Draper 14'; G. Furlong 25'; Carson 27'

Umpires:
Ilango Kanabathu (MAS)
Reinier Diaz (CUB)

==== Semi-finals ====
3 May 2019
17:50

Italy	1–3	Canada
Lago 28'	Report	S. Panesar 32'; Johnston 43'; Scholfield 60'

Umpires:
Dave Dowdall (ENG)
Johannes Berneth (GER)

3 May 2019
20:05

Austria	1–3	Malaysia
Thörnblom 32'	Report	Faizal 11'; Marhan 55'; Meor 58'

Umpires:
Sébastien Michielsen (BEL)
Ben De Young (AUS)

==== Third and fourth place ====
4 May 2019
17:50

Austria	1–2	Italy
P. Schmidt 49'	Report	Sior 47'; Keenan 49'

Umpires:
Johannes Berneth (GER)
Hugo Romero (PAR)

==== Final ====
4 May 2019
20:05

Malaysia	2–3	Canada
Firhan 8'; Tengku 53'	Report	Tupper 20'; Bissett 22'; Kirkpatrick 43'

Umpires:
Federico García (URU)
Sébastien Michielsen (BEL)

=== Final standings ===
Rank	Team
1st place, gold medalist(s)	Canada
2nd place, silver medalist(s)	Malaysia
3rd place, bronze medalist(s)	Italy
4	Austria
5	Wales
6	China
7	Brazil
8	Belarus

Qualified for the FIH Olympic Qualifiers

=== Awards ===
The following awards were given at the conclusion of the tournament.

Best Player	Best Goalkeeper	Best Young player	Top Goalscorer
(Malaysia) Tengku Ahmad Tajuddin	(Canada) David Carter	(Italy) Francois Sior	(Malaysia) Tengku Ahmad Tajuddin

== Bhubaneswar ==
FIH Series Finals Bhubaneswar
Tournament details
- Host country: India
- City: Bhubaneswar
- Dates: 6–15 June
- Teams: 8
- Venue: Kalinga Stadium

Final positions
- Champions: India
- Runner-up: South Africa
- Third place: Japan

Tournament statistics
- Matches played: 20
- Goals scored: 120 (6 per match)
- Top scorer(s): (India) Varun Kumar (India) Harmanpreet Singh (Russia) Semen Matkovskiy (6 goals)
- Best player: (India) Manpreet Singh

All times are local (UTC+5:30).

=== First round ===
==== Pool A ====
Pos	Team	Pld	W	D	L	GF	GA	GD	Pts	
1	India (H)	3	3	0	0	23	1	+22	9	Semi-finals
2	Russia	3	2	0	1	15	13	+2	6	Cross-overs
3	Poland	3	1	0	2	7	6	+1	3	Cross-overs
4	Uzbekistan	3	0	0	3	1	26	−25	0	Seventh place game

Source: FIH
Rules for classification: 1) points; 2) matches won; 3) goal difference; 4) goals for; 5) head-to-head result; 6) field goals scored.
(H) Hosts

6 June 2019
17:00

Poland	4–0	Uzbekistan
Bratkowski 5', 36'; Hulbój 27', 40'	Report

Umpires:
Xavier Fenaert (FRA)
Eduardo Lizana (ESP)

6 June 2019
19:00

India	10–0	Russia
Nilakanta 13'; Simranjeet 19'; Amit 20'; Harmanpreet 32', 48'; Varun 34'; Gursahibjit 37'; Akakshdeep 42', 56'; Vivek 45+'	Report

Umpires:
Maximilliano Scala (ARG)
Gus Soteriades (USA)

7 June 2019
17:00

Russia	12–1	Uzbekistan
Matkovskiy 13', 17', 26', 44', 48'; Skiperskiy 15', 22'; Lepeshkin 19'; Sobolevskiy 22'; Proskuraikov 36'; Khairullin 40'; Starienko 59'	Report	Khakimov 29'

Umpires:
Ahmed El-Sayed (EGY)
David Sweetman (SCO)

7 June 2019
19:00

Poland	1–3	India
Hulbój 25'	Report	Manpreet 21', 26'; Harmanpreet 36'

Umpires:
Chen Dekang (CHN)
Zeke Newman (AUS)

9 June 2019
17:00

Russia	3–2	Poland
Golubev 17', 59'; Matkovskiy 59'	Report	Hulbój 28'; Bratkowski 45'

Umpires:
Gus Soteriades (USA)
Anil Kumar (IND)

10 June 2019
19:00

India	10–0	Uzbekistan
Varun 4', 22'; Akakshdeep 11', 26', 53'; Amit 15'; Nilakanta 27'; Mandeep 30', 60'; Gursahibjit 45'	Report

Umpires:
Eduardo Lizana (ESP)
Ahmed El-Sayed (EGY)

==== Pool B ====
Pos	Team	Pld	W	D	L	GF	GA	GD	Pts	
1	United States	3	2	1	0	13	2	+11	7	Semi-finals
2	Japan	3	2	1	0	7	3	+4	7	Cross-overs
3	South Africa	3	1	0	2	6	4	+2	3	Cross-overs
4	Mexico	3	0	0	3	1	18	−17	0	Seventh place game

Source: FIH
Rules for classification: 1) points; 2) matches won; 3) goal difference; 4) goals for; 5) head-to-head result; 6) field goals scored.

6 June 2019
08:45

South Africa	0–2	United States
	Report	De Angelis 47'; Singh 57'

Umpires:
Chen Dekang (CHN)
Ahmed El-Sayed (EGY)

7 June 2019
08:45

Japan	3–1	Mexico
Zendana 3', 34'; Yamada 21'	Report	E. Hernández 3'

Umpires:
Sébastien Duterme (BEL)
Anil Kumar (IND)

8 June 2019
17:00

United States	9–0	Mexico
Barminski 3', 53'; Croonenberghs 14'; Sundeen 30'; Cicchi 37', 52'; Montilla 39'; De Angelis 42'; Holt 60'	Report

Umpires:
Maximilliano Scala (ARG)
Sébastien Duterme (BEL)

8 June 2019
19:00

Japan	2–0	South Africa
Fukuda 26'; Murata 45'	Report

Umpires:
Eduardo Lizana (ESP)
Zeke Newman (AUS)

10 June 2019
08:45

United States	2–2	Japan
Huisman 41', 51'	Report	K. Tanaka 45'; Hoshi 59'

Umpires:
David Sweetman (SCO)
Xavier Fenaert (FRA)

10 June 2019
17:00

South Africa	6–0	Mexico
De Souza 1'; Spooner 17'; Ntuli 32'; Smith 50'; Pautz 53'; Horne 58'	Report

Umpires:
Maximilliano Scala (ARG)
Zeke Newman (AUS)

=== Second round ===
Cross-overs
12 June
Japan	6
Poland	2
12 June
Russia	1
South Africa	2

Semi-finals
14 June
India	7
Japan	2
14 June
United States	1
South Africa	2

Final
15 June
India	5
South Africa	1
Third place
15 June
Japan	4
United States	2

==== Seventh and eighth place ====
12 June 2019
08:45

Uzbekistan	3–4	Mexico
Khaytboev 41'; O. Mirzakarimov 42'; Satlikov 44'	Report	M. Méndez 29'; Palma 30'; Y. Méndez 54'; R. García 59'

Umpires:
Anil Kumar (IND)
Chen Dekang (CHN)

==== Cross-overs ====
12 June 2019
17:00

Japan	6–2	Poland
Yamada 20'; Zendana 23'; K. Tenaka 32'; Yamasaki 36', 60'; Kitazato 47'	Report	Gumny 7'; Hulbój 26'

Umpires:
Gus Soteriades (USA)
David Sweetman (SCO)

12 June 2019
19:15

Russia	1–2	South Africa
Arussia 47'	Report	Ntuli 40'; Julius 53'

Umpires:
Eduardo Lizana (ESP)
Sébastien Duterme (BEL)

==== Fifth and sixth place ====
14 June 2019
08:45

Russia	3–2	Poland
Golubev 16'; Lepeshkin 22'; Khairullin 36'	Report	Kasprzyk 30'; Gumny 55'

Umpires:
Gus Soteraides (USA)
Maximilliano Scala (ARG)

==== Semi-finals ====
14 June 2019
17:00

United States	1–2	South Africa
A. Käppeler 15+'	Report	Smith 42'; Spooner 60'

Umpires:
Sébastien Duterme (BEL)
Xavier Fenaert (FRA)

14 June 2019
19:15

India	7–2	Japan
Harmanpreet 7'; Varun 14'; Ramandeep 23', 37'; Hardik 25'; Gursahibjit 43'; Vivek 47'	Report	Kitazato 2'; Watanabe 20'

Umpires:
Zeke Newman (AUS)
Eduardo Lizana (ESP)

==== Third and fourth place ====
15 June 2019
17:00

Japan	4–2	United States
Murata 11'; Kirishita 25'; K. Tanaka 60', 60+'	Report	A. Käppeler 10', 59'

Umpires:
Chen Dekang (CHN)
Ahmed El-Sayed (EGY)

==== Final ====
15 June 2019
19:15

India	5–1	South Africa
Varun 2', 49'; Harmanpreet 11', 25'; Vivek 35'	Report	Pautz 53'

Umpires:
David Sweetman (SCO)
Xavier Fenaert (FRA)

=== Final standings ===
Rank	Team
1st place, gold medalist(s)	India
2nd place, silver medalist(s)	South Africa
3rd place, bronze medalist(s)	Japan
4	United States
5	Russia
6	Poland
7	Mexico
8	Uzbekistan

Qualified for the FIH Olympic Qualifiers

=== Awards ===
The following awards were given at the conclusion of the tournament.

Best Player	Best Goalkeeper	Best Young player	Top Goalscorers
(India) Manpreet Singh	(United States) Jonathan Klages	(India) Vivek Prasad	(India) Varun Kumar (India) Harmanpreet Singh (Russia) Semen Matkovskiy

== Le Touquet ==
FIH Series Finals Le Touquet
Tournament details
- Host country: France
- City: Le Touquet
- Dates: 15–23 June
- Teams: 8
- Venue: Stade Eric Choteau

Final positions
- Champions: France
- Runner-up: Ireland
- Third place: South Korea

Tournament statistics
- Matches played: 20
- Goals scored: 98 (4.9 per match)
- Top scorer(s): (France) Victor Charlet (Ireland) Shane O'Donoghue (South Korea) Jang Jong-hyun (5 goals)

All times are local (UTC+2).

=== First round ===
==== Pool A ====
Pos	Team	Pld	W	D	L	GF	GA	GD	Pts	
1	Ireland	3	2	0	1	16	4	+12	6	Semi-finals
2	Scotland	3	2	0	1	10	6	+4	6	Cross-overs
3	Egypt	3	2	0	1	7	3	+4	6	Cross-overs
4	Singapore	3	0	0	3	0	19	−19	0	Seventh place game

Source: FIH
Rules for classification: 1) points; 2) matches won; 3) goal difference; 4) goals for; 5) head-to-head result; 6) field goals scored.

15 June 2019
11:15

Ireland	4–2	Scotland
Magee 2', 35'; O'Donoghue 13'; Robson 40'	Report	Riddell 7'; Bain 36'

Umpires:
Nazmi Kamaruddin (MAS)
Michiel Otten (NED)

15 June 2019
13:30

Egypt	3–0	Singapore
El-Ganaini 5'; Edris 20'; Gamal 48'	Report

Umpires:
Fraser Bell (SCO)
Tyler Klenk (CAN)

16 June 2019
11:15

Scotland	5–0	Singapore
Golden 3', 15'; Greaves 24'; Bain 42'; Bull 47'	Report

Umpires:
Diego Estébanez (ESP)
Kris Cholewa (IRL)

16 June 2019
13:30

Egypt	2–1	Ireland
Adel 23'; El-Hakim 47'	Report	Jackson 19'

Umpires:
Paul Walker (ENG)
Benjamin Peters (USA)

18 June 2019
13:30

Scotland	3–2	Egypt
Golden 26'; Riddell 37'; Bain 60'	Report	Ibrahim 23', 56'

Umpires:
Nick Bennett (ENG)
Paul Walker (ENG)

18 June 2019
15:45

Ireland	11–0	Singapore
O'Donoghue 1', 32', 42'; C. Harte 4', 45'; Nelson 8'; S. Cole 23', 37'; Walker 25'; Madeley 37'; L. Cole 60'	Report

Umpires:
Tyler Klenk (CAN)
Nazmi Kamaruddin (MAS)

==== Pool B ====
Pos	Team	Pld	W	D	L	GF	GA	GD	Pts	
1	France (H)	3	2	1	0	13	2	+11	7	Semi-finals
2	South Korea	3	2	1	0	12	4	+8	7	Cross-overs
3	Chile	3	0	1	2	3	8	−5	1	Cross-overs
4	Ukraine	3	0	1	2	5	19	−14	1	Seventh place game

Source: FIH
Rules for classification: 1) points; 2) matches won; 3) goal difference; 4) goals for; 5) head-to-head result; 6) field goals scored.
(H) Hosts

15 June 2019
15:45

South Korea	3–1	Chile
Lee N. 12'; Lee S. 29'; Hwang 58'	Report	F. Renz 3'

Umpires:
Paul Walker (ENG)
Kris Cholewa (IRL)

15 June 2019
18:00

France	9–1	Ukraine
Baumgarten 1'; Bellenger 6'; Charlet 22', 52'; Branicki 30', 44', 55'; Goyet 42'; Martin-Brisac 47'	Report	Koshelenko 27'

Umpires:
Diego Estébanez (ESP)
Benjamin Peters (USA)

16 June 2019
15:45

Ukraine	2–2	Chile
Kalinchuk 34'; Koshelenko 42'	Report	Purcell 41'; Osses 43'

Umpires:
Nazmi Kamaruddin (MAS)
Nick Bennett (ENG)

16 June 2019
18:00

South Korea	1–1	France
Jang 28'	Report	H. Genestet 11'

Umpires:
Tyler Klenk (CAN)
Michiel Otten (NED)

18 June 2019
11:15

Ukraine	2–8	South Korea
Shevchuk 27'; Koshelenko 45'	Report	Yang 11'; Hong 19'; Jang 32', 48'; Jeon 38', 53'; Kim Ju. 39'; Lee J. 57'

Umpires:
Benjamin Peters (USA)
Michiel Otten (NED)

18 June 2019
18:00

France	3–0	Chile
Charlet 3'; Tynevez 30'; Van Straaten 57'	Report

Umpires:
Fraser Bell (SCO)
Kris Cholewa (IRL)

=== Second round ===
Cross-overs
20 June
South Korea (p.s.o.)	2 (3)
Egypt	2 (0)
20 June
Scotland	1
Chile	0

Semi-finals
22 June
Ireland	4
South Korea	2
22 June
France	3
Scotland	0

Final
23 June
Ireland	1
France	3
Third place
23 June
South Korea	5
Scotland	0

==== Cross-overs ====
20 June 2019
15:30

Scotland	1–0	Chile
Golden 35'	Report

Umpires:
Nick Bennett (ENG)
Kris Cholewa (IRL)

20 June 2019
18:00

South Korea	2–2	Egypt
Lee J. 28'; Jung 60'	Report	Abd El-Hakim 31'; Metwalli 53'
Penalties
Lee S. (penalty shoot-out scored); Lee J. (penalty shoot-out scored); Ji (penalty shoot-out scored)	3–0	(penalty shoot-out missed) Edris; (penalty shoot-out missed) Ad El; (penalty shoot-out missed) Mansour

Umpires:
Fraser Bell (SCO)
Nazmi Kamaruddin (MAS)

==== Seventh and eighth place ====
21 June 2019
15:30

Singapore	1–3	Ukraine
Noor 52'	Report	Koshelenko 11'; Shevchuk 20'; Moroz 39'

Umpires:
Diego Estebanez (ESP)
Kris Cholewa (IRL)

==== Fifth and sixth place ====
21 June 2019
18:00

Chile	2–3	Egypt
Richter 9', 27'	Report	Gamal 7'; Edris 26'; Ibrahim 42'

Umpires:
Tyler Klenk (CAN)
Benjamin Peters (USA)

==== Semi-finals ====
22 June 2019
15:30

Ireland	4–2	South Korea
Nelson 30'; Magee 31'; O'Donoghue 32'; Glassey 60'	Report	Jeon 25'; Lee S. 41'

Umpires:
Nazmi Kamaruddin (MAS)
Paul Walker (ENG)

22 June 2019
18:00

France	3–0	Scotland
Tynevez 13'; Rogeau 13'; H. Genestet 51'	Report

Umpires:
Michiel Otten (NED)
Nick Bennett (ENG)

==== Third and fourth place ====
23 June 2019
15:30

South Korea	5–0	Scotland
Jeon 27'; Lee N. 32'; Jang 41', 50'; Kim Su. 45'	Report

Umpires:
Michiel Otten (NED)
Nick Bennett (ENG)

==== Final ====
23 June 2019
18:00

Ireland	1–3	France
Murray 15'	Report	Rogeau 10'; Charlet 23', 35'

Umpires:
Paul Walker (ENG)
Fraser Bell (SCO)

=== Final standings ===
Rank	Team
1st place, gold medalist(s)	France
2nd place, silver medalist(s)	Ireland
3rd place, bronze medalist(s)	South Korea
4	Scotland
5	Egypt
6	Chile
7	Ukraine
8	Singapore

Qualified for the FIH Olympic Qualifiers

=== Awards ===
The following awards were given at the conclusion of the tournament.

Best Player	Best Goalkeeper	Best Young player	Top Goalscorers
(France) Charles Masson	(South Korea) Kim Jae-hyeon	(Scotland) Cameron Golden	(France) Victor Charlet (Ireland) Shane O'Donoghue (South Korea) Jang Jong-hyun
