= Lee Jung-jun =

South Korean field hockey player

Personal information
- Born: 17 May 1991 (age 35) South Korea
- Height: 176 cm (5 ft 9 in)

Sport
- Sport: Field hockey
- Position: Forward
National team
Years	Team	Caps	Goals
2011	South Korea U–21	6	(1)
2013–	South Korea	130	(31)
Medal record
Men's field hockey
Representing South Korea
Asian Games
Bronze medal – third place	2022 Hangzhou	Team
Asian Cup
Gold medal – first place	2013 Ipoh
Gold medal – first place	2022 Jakarta
Silver medal – second place	2025 Rajgir
FIH Hockey Series
Bronze medal – third place	2018–19 Le Touquet	Team
Asian Champions Trophy
Gold medal – first place	2021 Dhaka
Sultan Azlan Shah Cup
Gold medal – first place	2019 Ipoh
Silver medal – second place	2022 Ipoh
Sultan of Johor Cup
Bronze medal – third place	2011 Johor Bahru

Lee Jung-jun (이정준, born 17 May 1991) is a South Korean field hockey player, who plays as a forward.

== Career ==
=== Under–21 ===
In 2011, Lee was a member of the South Korea U–21 at the inaugural edition of the Sultan of Johor Cup in Johor Bahru. Lee's team won a bronze medal.

=== Senior national team ===
Lee made his senior international debut in 2015.

Throughout his career he has medalled with the national team on numerous occasions, winning gold at the 2013 and 2022 editions of the Asian Cup in Ipoh and Jakarta, respectively, as well as the 2021 Asian Champions Trophy in Dhaka. He also won bronze at the 2018–19 FIH Series Finals in Le Touquet. In addition, he won gold and silver at the 2019 and 2022 editions of the Sultan Azlan Shah Cup, respectively.

In 2023, Lee was named to the national team for the FIH World Cup in Bhubaneswar and Rourkela, as well as the Asian Games in Hangzhou.
