= Son Da-in =

South Korean field hockey player (born 1999)

Personal information
- Born: 17 May 1999 (age 27) South Korea
- Height: 179 cm (5 ft 10 in)

Sport
- Sport: Field hockey
- Position: Forward
National team
Years	Team	Caps	Goals
2023–	South Korea	35	(7)
Medal record
Men's field hockey
Representing South Korea
Asian Games
Bronze medal – third place	2022 Hangzhou	Team
Asian Cup
Silver medal – second place	2025 Rajgir	Team

Son Da-in (Korean: 손다인, born 17 May 1999) is a field hockey player from South Korea, who plays as a forward.

== Career ==
=== Senior national team ===
Son made his senior international debut for South Korea in 2023. He earned his first senior international cap at the Asian Champions Trophy in Chennai. Later that year he represented the national team at the delayed Asian Games, winning a bronze medal at the tournament.

After failing to qualify for the XXXIII Summer Olympics in Paris, Son did not represent the national team again until 2025. He was a member of the squad at the 2024–25 FIH Nations Cup in Kuala Lumpur, as well as the 2025 Asian Cup in Rajgir, winning a silver medal at the latter.

=== International goals ===
Goal	Date	Location	Opponent	Score	Result	Competition	Ref.
1	24 September 2023	Gongshu Canal Sports Stadium, Hangzhou, China	Indonesia	5–0	10–0	2022 Asian Games	
2	29 August 2025	Bihar Sports University Hockey Stadium, Rajgir, India	Chinese Taipei	1–0	7–0	2025 Asian Cup	
3	29 August 2025	Bihar Sports University Hockey Stadium, Rajgir, India	Chinese Taipei	3–0	7–0	2025 Asian Cup	
4	29 August 2025	Bihar Sports University Hockey Stadium, Rajgir, India	Chinese Taipei	7–0	7–0	2025 Asian Cup	
5	1 September 2025	Bihar Sports University Hockey Stadium, Rajgir, India	Bangladesh	1–0	5–1	2025 Asian Cup	
6	1 September 2025	Bihar Sports University Hockey Stadium, Rajgir, India	Bangladesh	2–0	5–1	2025 Asian Cup	
7	7 September 2025	Bihar Sports University Hockey Stadium, Rajgir, India	India	1–4	1–4	2025 Asian Cup	
