= Jeong Jun-woo =

South Korean field hockey player

Personal information
- Born: 2 April 1993 (age 33) South Korea
- Height: 180 cm (5 ft 11 in)

Sport
- Sport: Field hockey
- Position: Forward
National team
Years	Team	Caps	Goals
2017–	South Korea	60	(10)
Medal record
Men's field hockey
Representing South Korea
Asian Games
Bronze medal – third place	2022 Hangzhou	Team
Asian Cup
Gold medal – first place	2022 Jakarta	Team
Asian Champions Trophy
Gold medal – first place	2021 Dhaka	Team
Sultan Azlan Shah Cup
Silver medal – second place	2022 Ipoh	Team

Jeong Jun-woo (정준우, born 2 April 1993) is a field hockey player from South Korea, who plays as a forward.

== Career ==
=== Senior national team ===
Jeong made his senior international debut in 2017.

Throughout his career he has medalled with the national team on numerous occasions, winning gold at the 2021 Asian Champions Trophy in Dhaka, and the 2022 Asian Cup in Jakarta. He also won silver at the 2022 edition of the Sultan Azlan Shah Cup.

In 2023, Jeong was named to the national team for the FIH World Cup in Bhubaneswar and Rourkela, as well as the Asian Games in Hangzhou.
