= Raj Kumar Pal =

Indian field hockey player (born 1998)

Personal information
- Born: 1 May 1998 (age 28) Karampur, Ghazipur, Uttar Pradesh, India

Sport
- Sport: Field hockey
- Position: Midfielder
Senior career
Years	Team	Caps	Goals
–	Uttar Pradesh Hockey	-	-
–	Air India	-	-
–	CAG	-	-
2024–	Delhi SG Pipers	-	-
National team
Years	Team	Caps	Goals
2020–	India	99	(9)
Medal record
Men's field hockey
Representing India
Olympic Games
Bronze medal – third place	2024 Paris	Team
Asian Games
Gold medal – first place	2026 Aichi-Nagoya	Team
Asia Cup
Gold medal – first place	2025 Rajgir
Bronze medal – third place	2022 Jakarta
Asian Champions Trophy
Gold medal – first place	2024 Hulunbuir
Bronze medal – third place	2021 Dhaka

Raj Kumar Pal (born 1 May 1998) is an Indian field hockey player who plays as a midfielder. He made his international debut in February 2020 at the 2020–21 Men's FIH Pro League. He was a member of the Indian team that won bronze medal at the 2024 Paris Olympics. In 2026, he was honoured with Arjuna Award.
