= Jarmanpreet Singh =

Indian field hockey player

- Jarmanpreet Singh in 2017

Personal information
- Full name: Jarmanpreet Singh Bal
- Born: 18 July 1996 (age 30) Amritsar, Punjab, India
- Height: 1.85 m (6 ft 1 in)

Sport
- Sport: Field hockey
- Position: Defender
Senior career
Years	Team	Caps	Goals
–	Hockey Punjab	-	-
–	Railways	-	-
–	Income Tax	-	-
2024–	Delhi SG Pipers	-	-
National team
Years	Team	Caps	Goals
2013–2014	India U21	12	(0)
2018–	India	178	(8)
Medal record
Men's field hockey
Representing India
Olympic Games
Bronze medal – third place	2024 Paris	Team
Champions Trophy
Silver medal – second place	2018 Breda
Commonwealth Games
Silver medal – second place	2022 Birmingham	Team
Asian Games
Gold medal – first place	2022 Hangzhou	Team
Gold medal – first place	2026 Aichi-Nagoya	Team
Asia Cup
Gold medal – first place	2025 Rajgir
Asian Champions Trophy
Gold medal – first place	2018 Muscat
Gold medal – first place	2023 Chennai
Gold medal – first place	2024 Hulunbuir
Gold medal – first place	2026 Punjab
Bronze medal – third place	2021 Dhaka

Jarmanpreet Singh Bal (born 18 July 1996) is an Indian field hockey player who plays as a defender. He made his Olympic debut at the 2024 Paris Olympics, where India won the bronze medal.

== Early life ==
Singh is from Amritsar, Punjab. Earlier, he played for Railway Sports Promotion Board in the domestic tournaments. But later joined the Income Tax Department team.

== Career ==
Singh was part of the Indian junior team at the Junior World Cup 2016. He was banned for two years in 2016 as he failed a dope test after he took a painkiller prescribed by his doctor for back pain.

He made his senior international debut at the 2018 Men's Hockey Champions Trophy in Breda where India won the silver medal. He was part of the gold medal-winning Indian team at the 2022 Asian Games in Hangzhou.

== Awards ==
Year	Award	Category	Result	Ref(s)
2024	Arjuna Award	Outstanding performance in Sports and Games 2024	Won	
