= Kim Sung-hyun (field hockey) =

South Korean field hockey player

Personal information
- Born: 26 August 1994 (age 31) South Korea
- Height: 178 cm (5 ft 10 in)

Sport
- Sport: Field hockey
- Position: Midfield
National team
Years	Team	Caps	Goals
2019–	South Korea	39	(8)
Medal record
Men's field hockey
Representing South Korea
Asian Games
Bronze medal – third place	2022 Hangzhou	Team
Asian Cup
Gold medal – first place	2022 Jakarta	Team
FIH Hockey Series
Bronze medal – third place	2018–19 Le Touquet	Team
Asian Champions Trophy
Gold medal – first place	2021 Dhaka	Team
Sultan Azlan Shah Cup
Silver medal – second place	2022 Ipoh	Team

Kim Sung-hyun (Korean: 김성현; born 26 August 1994) is a field hockey midfielder from South Korea.

== Career ==
=== Senior national team ===
Kim made his senior international debut in 2019.

Throughout his career he has medalled with the national team on numerous occasions, winning gold at the 2021 Asian Champions Trophy in Dhaka, and the 2022 Asian Cup in Jakarta. He also won bronze at the 2018–19 FIH Series Finals in Le Touquet. In addition, he won silver at the 2022 edition of the Sultan Azlan Shah Cup.

In 2023, Kim was named to the national team for the FIH World Cup in Bhubaneswar and Rourkela, as well as the Asian Games in Hangzhou.
