= Yang Ji-hun =

South Korean field hockey player (born 1991)

Personal information
- Born: 20 August 1991 (age 34) South Korea
- Height: 175 cm (5 ft 9 in)

Sport
- Sport: Field hockey
- Position: Forward
National team
Years	Team	Caps	Goals
2011	South Korea U–21	6	(5)
2016–	South Korea	97	(31)
Medal record
Men's field hockey
Representing South Korea
Asian Games
Bronze medal – third place	2022 Hangzhou	Team
Asian Cup
Gold medal – first place	2022 Jakarta
Silver medal – second place	2025 Rajgir
FIH Series
Bronze medal – third place	2018–19 Le Touquet	Team
Asian Champions Trophy
Gold medal – first place	2021 Dhaka
Sultan of Johor Cup
Bronze medal – third place	2011 Johor Bahru

Yang Ji-hun (Korean: 양지훈, born 20 August 1991) is a field hockey player from South Korea, who plays as a forward.

== Career ==
=== Under–21 ===
In 2011, Yang was a member of the South Korea U–21 at the inaugural edition of the Sultan of Johor Cup in Johor Bahru. He captained the team to a bronze medal.

=== Senior national team ===
Yang made his senior international debut in 2016.

Throughout his career he has medalled with the national team on numerous occasions, winning gold at the 2021 Asian Champions Trophy in Dhaka, and the 2022 Asian Cup in Jakarta. He also won bronze at the 2018–19 FIH Series Finals in Le Touquet.

In 2023, Yang was named to the national team for the FIH World Cup in Bhubaneswar and Rourkela, as well as the Asian Games in Hangzhou.
