= Japan national field hockey team =

Japan national field hockey team may refer to:

- Japan men's national field hockey team
- Japan women's national field hockey team
