= Park Cheoleon =

South Korean field hockey player

Personal information
- Born: 2 November 1998 (age 27) South Korea
- Height: 172 cm (5 ft 8 in)

Sport
- Sport: Field hockey
- Position: Defence
National team
Years	Team	Caps	Goals
2021–	South Korea	22	(4)
Medal record
Men's field hockey
Representing South Korea
Asian Games
Bronze medal – third place	2022 Hangzhou	Team
Asia Cup
Silver medal – second place	2025 Rajgir
Asian Champions Trophy
Gold medal – first place	2021 Dhaka
Sultan Azlan Shah Cup
Silver medal – second place	2022 Ipoh

Park Cheoleon (Korean: 박철언; born 2 November 1998) is a field hockey player from South Korea, who plays as a defender.

== Career ==
=== Senior national team ===
Park made his senior international debut in 2021.

Throughout his career he has medalled with the national team twice, winning gold at the 2021 Asian Champions Trophy in Dhaka, and silver at the 2022 edition of the Sultan Azlan Shah Cup.

In 2023, Park was named to the national team for the Asian Games in Hangzhou.
