= Raiki Fujishima =

Japanese field hockey player

Personal information
- Born: 29 December 1999 (age 26) Oyabe, Toyama Japan
- Height: 177 cm (5 ft 10 in)

Sport
- Sport: Field hockey
- Position: Defence
National team
Years	Team	Caps	Goals
2017–2018	Japan U–21	11	(4)
2019–	Japan	49	(8)
Medal record
Men's field hockey
Representing Japan
Asian Games
Silver medal – second place	2022 Hangzhou	Team
FIH Hockey Series
Bronze medal – third place	2018–19 Le Touquet	Team
Asian Champions Trophy
Silver medal – second place	2021 Dhaka	Team
Bronze medal – third place	2023 Chennai	Team

Raiki Fujishima (藤島 来葵, born 29 December 1999) is a Japanese field hockey player, who plays as a defender.

== Career ==
=== Under–21 ===
Fujishima has represented the Japan U–21 side at two Sultan of Johor Cups.

=== Senior national team ===
Fujishima made his senior international debut in 2019.

Since his debut, Fujishima has medalled with the national team on numerous occasions. He won bronze at the FIH Series Finals in Bhubaneswar. He has also medalled twice at the Asian Champions Trophy, winning silver at the 2021 edition in Dhaka, followed by bronze at the 2023 edition in Chennai.

In 2023, Fujishima was named to the national team for the FIH World Cup in Bhubaneswar and Rourkela, as well as the Asian Games in Hangzhou. At the Asian Games, he won a silver medal.
