= Yoshiki Kirishita =

Japanese field hockey player

Personal information
- Born: 27 December 1998 (age 27) Nara Prefecture, Japan
- Height: 1.80 m (5 ft 11 in)

Sport
- Sport: Field hockey
- Position: Defender
- Club: Tochigi Liebe
National team
Years	Team	Caps	Goals
2018–present	Japan	68	(4)
Medal record
Men's field hockey
Representing Japan
Asian Games
Gold medal – first place	2018 Jakarta	Team
Asian Champions Trophy
Silver medal – second place	2021 Dhaka
- Updated on 31 December 2021

Yoshiki Kirishita (霧下 義貴, Kirishita Yoshiki, born 27 December 1998) is a Japanese field hockey player. He competed in the 2020 Summer Olympics.

He was a part of the Japan squad which won their first Asian Games gold medal in men's hockey in 2018.
