= Kosei Kawabe =

Japanese field hockey player

Ryoma Ooka
Personal information
- Born: 20 June 1999 (age 27) Japan
- Height: 167 cm (5 ft 6 in)

Sport
- Sport: Field hockey
- Position: Forward
National team
| Years | Team | Caps | Goals |
| 2018–2019 | Japan U21 | 12 | (5) |
| 2021– | Japan | 33 | (8) |
Medal record
Men's field hockey
Representing Japan
Asian Games
| Silver medal – second place | 2022 Hangzhou | Team |
Asian Champions Trophy
| Silver medal – second place | 2021 Dhaka | Team |
| Bronze medal – third place | 2023 Chennai | Team |

Kosei Kawabe (河邉 皓星, born 20 June 1999) is a Japanese field hockey player, who plays as a forward for the Japan national team.

== Career ==
=== Under–21 ===
Kawabe has represented the Japan U21 side at two Sultan of Johor Cups. At the 2019 edition, he was awarded Player of the Tournament.

=== Senior national team ===
Kawabe made his senior international debut in 2021.

Since his debut, Kawabe has medalled at two Asian Champions Trophies. At the 2021 edition in Dhaka he won silver, followed by bronze at the 2023 edition in Chennai.

In 2023, Kawabe was named to the national team for the FIH World Cup in Bhubaneswar and Rourkela, as well as the Asian Games in Hangzhou. At the Asian Games, he won a silver medal.
