= Dilpreet Singh =

Indian field hockey player

Personal information
- Born: 12 November 1999 (age 27) Butala, Amritsar District, Punjab, India
- Height: 180 cm (5 ft 11 in)

Sport
- Sport: Field hockey
- Position: Forward
- Club: Indian Oil Corporation
Senior career
Years	Team	Caps	Goals
–	Petroleum Sports Promotion Board	-	-
–	Indian Oil Corporation	-	-
National team
Years	Team	Caps	Goals
2016–	India U18		-
2017–2019	India U21	12	(11)
2018–	India	142	(61)
Medal record
Men's field hockey
Representing India
Olympic Games
Bronze medal – third place	2020 Tokyo	Team
Champions Trophy
Silver medal – second place	2018 Breda
Asian Games
Gold medal – first place	2026 Aichi-Nagoya	Team
Bronze medal – third place	2018 Jakarta	Team
Asia Cup
Gold medal – first place	2025 Rajgir
Asian Champions Trophy
Gold medal – first place	2018 Muscat
Gold medal – first place	2026 Punjab
Bronze medal – third place	2021 Dhaka
Boys' Asia Cup
Gold medal – first place	2016 Dhaka

Dilpreet Singh (born 12 November 1999) is an Indian field hockey player who plays as a forward for the national team. He is registered with the Punjab Armed Police and plays for Hockey Punjab in the domestic tournaments. He plays for Vedanta Kalinga Lancers in the Hockey India League.

== Early life ==
Singh belongs to Butala, Amritsar district, Punjab, India. He was born to Balwinder Singh, who was a hockey player in Army and it was due to his encouragement that Dilpreet started playing this sport. He initially trained in Khadur Sahib Academy of his father and later on took coaching from Maharaja Ranjit Singh Hockey Academy located in Amritsar, and then from Jalandhar's Surjit Academy.

== Career ==
After missing the 2024 Olympics, Singh made a comeback to play the two-twst series against Germany in 2024 and was also selected in the final team for the 2024–25 Men's FIH Pro League at Bhubaneswar. He scored in the 2–0 win against Spain on 16 February 2025. Earlier, he played the Pro League in 2020–21, 2021–22 and 2022–23.

He became an Olympic medalist taking part in the Indian team at the 2020 Tokyo Olympic Games where India won a bronze medal.

He was part of the gold winning Indian team at the 2018 Men's Asian Champions Trophy at Muscat and a bronze at Dhaka in 2021. In 2018, he also participated and won a bronze in the 18th Asian Games at Jakarta and played the FIH Odisha Hockey World Cup Bhubaneswar, where India finished sixth. He was part of the XXI Commonwealth Games 2018 at Gold Coast, Australia, where India missed a medal finishing fourth.

He made his Junior India debut at the 2017 Sultan of Johor Cup winning a bronze and also played the 2019 Sultan of Johor Cup, at Johor Bahru, Malaysia, where India got a silver. He made his senior India debut at the age of 18 years, against Japan in the 4-nation invitational tournament at Tauranga. He was part of the boys' team that won the 2016 Youth Asia Cup.

He is employed with Punjab Police after a long stint with the Indian Oil Corporation team.

== Awards ==
- Singh received the Arjuna Award in 2021.
