= Kenta Tanaka =

Japanese field hockey player (born 1988)

Personal information
- Born: 4 May 1988 (age 38) Shiga Prefecture, Japan
- Height: 1.72 m (5 ft 8 in)

Sport
- Sport: Field hockey
- Position: Forward
Senior career
Years	Team	Caps	Goals
–2018	Minoshima Club	-	-
2018–2022	HGC	-	-
National team
Years	Team	Caps	Goals
2011–2021	Japan	166	-
Medal record
Men's field hockey
Representing Japan
Asian Games
Gold medal – first place	2018 Jakarta	Team
Asian Champions Trophy
Silver medal – second place	2021 Dhaka

Kenta Tanaka (田中 健太, Tanaka Kenta; born 4 May 1988) is a Japanese former field hockey player who played as a forward.

== International career ==
He was a part of the Japan squad which won the gold medal at the 2018 Asian Games. He was named the Player of the Tournament at the 2021 Men's Asian Champions Trophy where they won the silver medal.

== Club career ==
Before the 2018 Asian Games he played club hockey for Japanese club Minoshima Club. After those Asian Games he joined Dutch club HGC.
