= 2021 Men's Asian Champions Trophy =

Asian field hockey tournament

Tournament details
- Host country: Bangladesh
- City: Dhaka
- Dates: 14–22 December
- Teams: 5 (from 1 confederation)
- Venue: Maulana Bhasani Hockey Stadium

Final positions
- Champions: South Korea (1st title)
- Runner-up: Japan
- Third place: India

Tournament statistics
- Matches played: 14
- Goals scored: 91 (6.5 per match)
- Top scorer: (South Korea) Jang Jong-hyun (10 goals)
- Best player: (Japan) Kenta Tanaka
- Best young player: (Bangladesh) Biplob Kujur
- Best goalkeeper: (India) Suraj Karkera

The 2021 Men's Asian Champions Trophy was the sixth edition of the Men's Asian Champions Trophy, a men's field hockey tournament for the six best Asian national teams organized by the Asian Hockey Federation.

It was originally scheduled to be held in from 17 to 27 November 2020 at the Maulana Bhasani Hockey Stadium in Dhaka, Bangladesh. In August 2020 the Asian Hockey Federation announced that the tournament would be postponed because of the COVID-19 pandemic in Asia to 2021 to be held from 11 to 19 March 2021. In January 2021 the tournament was postponed again and it was planned to be held from 1 to 9 October 2021. The tournament was postponed again in September 2021 and was eventually held from 14 to 22 December 2021.

South Korea won their first Asian Champions Trophy title by defeating Japan 4–2 in a shoot-out after the match finished 3–3. The defending champions India and Pakistan played in the bronze medal match which India won 4–3.

== Teams ==
Alongside the hosts, Bangladesh, the following five teams will be participating. Malaysia had to withdraw from the tournament citing restrictive Covid quarantine.

Team	Appearance	Last appearance	Previous best performance
Bangladesh	1st	None	Debut
India	6th	2018	1st (2011, 2016, 2018)
Japan	6th	2018	2nd (2013)
Malaysia	6th	2018	3rd (2011, 2012, 2013, 2016, 2018)
Pakistan	6th	2018	1st (2012, 2013, 2018)
South Korea	4th	2018	4th (2016)

== Preliminary round ==
=== Standings ===
Pos	Team	Pld	W	D	L	GF	GA	GD	Pts	Qualification
1	India	4	3	1	0	20	3	+17	10	Semi-finals
2	South Korea	4	1	3	0	11	10	+1	6	Semi-finals
3	Pakistan	4	1	2	1	10	8	+2	5	Semi-finals
4	Japan	4	1	2	1	8	9	−1	5	Semi-finals
5	Bangladesh (H)	4	0	0	4	4	23	−19	0	
6	Malaysia	0	0	0	0	0	0	0	0	Withdrew

Source: FIH
Rules for classification: 1) points; 2) matches won; 3) goal difference; 4) goals for; 5) head-to-head result; 6) field goals for.
(H) Hosts

=== Results ===
14 December 2021
15:30

South Korea	2–2	India
Jang 42'; Kim S. 46'	Report	Lalit 3'; Harmanpreet 33'

Umpires:
Salim Lukcy (BAN)
Michiel Otten (NED)

14 December 2021
18:00

Japan	0–0	Pakistan
	Report

Umpires:
Federico Silva (ARG)
Rajput Sourabh (IND)

15 December 2021
15:30

India	9–0	Bangladesh
Dilpreet 12', 22', 44'; Lalit 29'; Jarmanpreet 31', 43'; Akashdeep 54'; Mandeep 55'; Harmanpreet 57'	Report

Umpires:
You Hyo-sik (KOR)
Shigeki Kodama (JPN)

15 December 2021
18:00

South Korea	3–3	Japan
Jang 30'; Kim H. 42'; Kim S. 55'	Report	Kirishita 20'; Murata 25'; Ke. Tanaka 37'

Umpires:
Shahbaz Ali (BAN)
Gabriel Labate (ARG)

17 December 2021
15:30

India	3–1	Pakistan
Harmanpreet 9', 53'; Akashdeep 42'	Report	Manzoor 45'

Umpires:
Federico Silva (ARG)
Shahbaz Ali (BAN)

17 December 2021
18:00

Bangladesh	2–3	South Korea
Arshad 8'; Deen 59'	Report	Jang 15'; Ji 48'; Park 54'

Umpires:
Rajput Sourabh (IND)
Gabriel Labate (ARG)

18 December 2021
15:30

Pakistan	3–3	South Korea
Afraz 24'; Rana 33', 57'	Report	Kim K. 14'; Ji 42'; Jang 56'

Umpires:
Salim Lucky (BAN)
Shigeki Kodama (JPN)

18 December 2021
18:00

Japan	5–0	Bangladesh
Ke. Tanaka 21'; Fujishima 24'; Kato 36', 42'; S. Tanaka 57'	Report

Umpires:
You Hyo-sik (KOR)
Michiel Otten (NED)

19 December 2021
15:30

India	6–0	Japan
Harmanpreet 10', 53'; Dilpreet 23'; Jarmanpreet 34'; Sumit 46'; Shamsher 54'	Report

Umpires:
Salim Lucky (BAN)
Shahbaz Ali (BAN)

19 December 2021
18:00

Pakistan	6–2	Bangladesh
Nadeem 14', 26'; Ahmad 18', 38'; Afraz 24'; Razzaq 34'	Report	Arshad 13', 35'

Umpires:
Shigeki Kodama (JPN)
Rajput Sourabh (IND)

== First to fourth place classification ==
=== Bracket ===
Semi-finals
21 December
South Korea	6
Pakistan	5
21 December
India	3
Japan	5

Final
22 December
South Korea (s.o.)	3 (4)
Japan	3 (2)
Third place
22 December
Pakistan	3
India	4

=== Semi-finals ===
21 December 2021
15:30

South Korea	6–5	Pakistan
Jang 11', 12', 25', 56'; Yang 30+'; Jeong 44'	Report	Umar Bhutta 3'; Manzoor 22'; Afraz 30'; M. Ali 47', 51'

Umpires:
Gabriel Labate (ARG)
Federico Silva (ARG)

21 December 2021
18:00

India	3–5	Japan
Dilpreet 17'; Harmanpreet 53'; Hardik 59'	Report	Yamada 1'; Fujishima 2'; Kirishita 29'; Kawabe 35'; Ooka 41'

Umpires:
Michiel Otten (NED)
You Hyo-sik (KOR)

=== Third and fourth place ===
22 December 2021
15:30

Pakistan	3–4	India
Afraz 10'; Rana 33'; Shakeel 57'	Report	Harmanpreet 2'; Sumit 45'; Varun 54'; Akashdeep 57'

Umpires:
Michiel Otten (NED)
Gabriel Labate (ARG)

=== Final ===
22 December 2021
18:00

South Korea	3–3	Japan
Jeong 8'; Jang 55', 60'	Report	Nagayoshi 24'; Ooka 29'; Kirishita 38'
Penalties
Lee Jun. (penalty shoot-out scored); Ji (penalty shoot-out scored); Hwang (penalty shoot-out scored); Lee H. (penalty shoot-out scored)	4–2	(penalty shoot-out missed) Fujishima; (penalty shoot-out scored) Ooka; (penalty shoot-out missed) Kawabe; (penalty shoot-out scored) S. Tanaka

Umpires:
Rajput Sourabh (IND)
Salim Lucky (BAN)

== Results ==
Pos	Team
1	South Korea (C)
2	Japan
3	India
4	Pakistan
5	Bangladesh (H)

Source: FIH
(C) Champion; (H) Host

== Statistics ==
=== Awards ===
Player of the Tournament	Goalkeeper of the Tournament	Leading Goalscorer	Rising Player of the Tournament
(Japan) Kenta Tanaka	(India) Suraj Karkera	(South Korea) Jang Jong-hyun	(Bangladesh) Biplob Kujur

=== Goalscorers ===
There were 91 goals scored in 14 matches, for an average of 6.5 goals per match.

10 goals

- (South Korea) Jang Jong-hyun

8 goals

- (India) Harmanpreet Singh

5 goals

- (India) Dilpreet Singh

4 goals

- (Pakistan) Afraz

3 goals

- (Bangladesh) Arshad Hossain
- (India) Akashdeep Singh
- (India) Jarmanpreet Singh
- (Japan) Yoshiki Kirishita
- (Pakistan) Waheed Rana

2 goals

- (India) Lalit Upadhyay
- (India) Sumit
- (Japan) Raiki Fujishima
- (Japan) Ryoma Ooka
- (Japan) Ryosei Kato
- (Japan) Kenta Tanaka
- (Pakistan) Ajaz Ahmad
- (Pakistan) Mubashar Ali
- (Pakistan) Junaid Manzoor
- (Pakistan) Ahmed Nadeem
- (South Korea) Jeong Jun-woo
- (South Korea) Ji Woo-cheon
- (South Korea) Kim Sung-hyun

1 goal

- (Bangladesh) Deen Emon
- (India) Hardik Singh
- (India) Mandeep Mor
- (India) Shamsher Singh
- (India) Varun Kumar
- (Japan) Kosei Kawabe
- (Japan) Kazuma Murata
- (Japan) Ken Nagayoshi
- (Japan) Seren Tanaka
- (Japan) Shota Yamada
- (Pakistan) Muhammad Umar Bhutta
- (Pakistan) Muhammad Razzaq
- (Pakistan) Moin Shakeel
- (South Korea) Kim Hyeong-jin
- (South Korea) Kim Kyu-beom
- (South Korea) Park Cheol-eon
- (South Korea) Yang Ji-hun

Source: FIH

== See also ==
- 2021 Women's Asian Champions Trophy
