= FIH Hockey Series =

International field hockey competition

- Sport: Field hockey
- Founded: 2018
- First season: 2018–19
- Folded: 2019
- Replaced by: Men's and women's Intercontinental Cups (from 2022)
- Continent: International (FIH)

The FIH Hockey Series, also known as the FIH Series, was an international field hockey competition organised by the International Hockey Federation (FIH). The competition, was also a qualifier for the Olympic Games.

The first edition was in 2018, which was also the temporary only edition after the International Hockey Federation decided to discontinue the FIH Series after 2019 and from 2022, will be replaced by men's and women's Intercontinental Cups, the new FIH tournament.

== Format ==
The Hockey Series was open to national teams that were not playing in the Men's or Women's FIH Pro League.

The Hockey Series took place in two rounds, the Open and the Finals. The nine highest-ranked teams in the FIH World Rankings (on 9 June 2017) skipped the Open and advanced directly to the Finals. All other national teams played in the Hockey Series Open. Fifteen teams qualified from the Hockey Series Open to the Hockey Series Finals, for a total of 24 teams in the Finals. Those teams played in three events, with eight teams per event (three automatic qualifiers and five that advanced from the Open).

The top two placed teams in each of the Finals events qualified for the FIH Olympic Qualifiers. In this qualification event, they were joined by the top four placed teams from the Pro League, and the two highest ranked teams not already qualified. The teams will be drawn and play a two-legged tie to determine six qualified nations for the Olympic Games.

== Men ==
=== Summaries ===
Year	Host	Final			Third place match			Teams PR / FR
Year	Host	Champions	Score	Runners-up	Third place	Score	Fourth place	Teams PR / FR
2018–19; Details	Kuala Lumpur, Malaysia	Canada	3–2	Malaysia	Italy	2–1	Austria	57/24
2018–19; Details	Bhubaneswar, India	India	5–1	South Africa	Japan	4–2	United States	57/24
2018–19; Details	Le Touquet, France	France	3–1	Ireland	South Korea	5–0	Scotland	57/24

== Women ==
=== Summaries ===
Year	Host	Final			Third place match			Teams PR / FR
Year	Host	Champions	Score	Runners-up	Third place	Score	Fourth place	Teams PR / FR
2018–19; Details	Banbridge, Ireland	South Korea	3–1	Ireland	Malaysia	3–0	Czech Republic	42/24
2018–19; Details	Hiroshima, Japan	India	3–1	Japan	Chile	3–3 (3–1 p.s.o.)	Russia	42/24
2018–19; Details	Valencia, Spain	Spain	4–2	Canada	Italy	3–1	South Africa	42/24
