= 2023–24 Men's FIH Pro League squads =

This article lists the squads of all participating teams in the 2023–24 Men's FIH Pro League.

== Argentina ==
The following is the Argentina squad for the 2023–24 FIH Pro League.

Head coach: Mariano Ronconi

1. Tomás Santiago (GK)
2. Agustín Machelett
4. Juan Catán
5. Facundo Zárate
7. Nicolás Keenan
8. Ignacio Nepote
9. Maico Casella (C)
10. Martín Ferreiro
11. Lucas Toscani
14. Nicolás Della Torre
16. Nicolás Cicileo
17. Santiago Tarazona
18. Federico Monja
21. Tomás Domene
22. Matías Rey (C)
23. Lucas Martínez
24. Neuhen Hernando (GK)
26. Agustín Mazzilli
27. Tadeo Marcucci
39. Thomas Habif
40. Agustín Bugallo
41. Bautista Capurro
42. Joaquín Krüger
43. Lucio Méndez
44. Tobías Martins
45. Gonzalo Yanello
46. Juan Díaz
40. Juan Ronconi
44. Ignacio Ibarra
44. Felipé Merlini
45. Francisco Druziuk
44. Lautaro Ferrero

== Australia ==
The following is the Australia squad for the 2023–24 FIH Pro League.

Head coach: Colin Batch

1. Lachlan Sharp
2. Thomas Craig
3. Corey Weyer
4. Jake Harvie
5. Thomas Wickham
6. Matthew Dawson
7. Nathan Ephraums
8. Johan Durst (GK)
9. Jacob Anderson
10. Joshua Beltz
11. Edward Ockenden (C)
12. Jacob Whetton
13. Blake Govers
15. Jayden Atkinson
16. Timothy Howard
17. Aran Zalewski (C)
19. Craig Marais
20. Ky Willott
21. Jack Welch
22. Flynn Ogilvie
23. Daniel Beale (C)
26. James Collins
27. Joel Rintala
28. Ashleigh Thomas (GK)
29. Timothy Brand
30. Andrew Charter (GK)
32. Jeremy Hayward (C)
33. Hayden Beltz
36. Anand Gupte
44. Benjamin Staines
38. Davis Atkin

== Belgium ==
The following is the Belgium squad for the 2023–24 FIH Pro League.

Head coach: (Netherlands) Michel van den Heuvel

1. Simon Vandenbroucke (GK)
2. Loïc van Doren (GK)
3. Thibeau Stockbroekx
4. Arthur van Doren
7. John-John Dohmen
8. Florent van Aubel
10. Cédric Charlier
12. Gauthier Boccard
13. Nicolas de Kerpel
16. Alexander Hendrickx
19. Félix Denayer (C)
20. William Ghislain
21. Vincent Vanasch (GK)
23. Arthur de Sloover
24. Antoine Kina
25. Loïck Luypaert
26. Victor Wegnez
27. Tom Boon
29. Maxime Van Oost
30. Nelson Onana
31. Arno Van Dessel
32. Tanguy Cosyns

== Germany ==
The following is the Germany squad for the 2023–24 FIH Pro League.

Head coach: André Henning

1. Alexander Stadler (GK)
2. Matthias Müller
3. Mats Grambusch (C)
4. Lukas Windfeder
5. Linus Müller
6. Raphael Hartkopf
7. Thies Prinz
8. Benedikt Schwarzhaupt
9. Niklas Wellen
10. Johannes Große
11. Constantin Staib
12. Timm Herzbruch
13. Paul-Philipp Kaufmann
14. Teo Hinrichs
15. Tom Grambusch
16. Gonzalo Peillat
17. Christopher Rühr
18. Mario Schachner
19. Justus Weigand
20. Niklas Bosserhoff
21. Michel Struthoff
22. Marco Miltkau
23. Martin Zwicker
24. Erik Kleinlein
25. Hannes Müller
26. Luca Wolff
27. Timur Oruz
28. Moritz Rothländer
29. Malte Hellwig
32. Niklas Garst (GK)
38. Antheus Barry
39. Joshua Onyekwue-Nnaji (GK)
44. Moritz Ludwig
62. Elian Mazkour
68. Dan Nguyen
74. Jean-Paul Danneberg (GK)

== Great Britain ==
The following is the Great Britain squad for the 2023–24 FIH Pro League.

Head coach: Paul Revington

2. Nicholas Park
3. Jack Waller
4. Rohan Bhuhi
5. David Ames (C)
6. Jacob Draper
7. Zachary Wallace
8. Rupert Shipperley
9. Harry Martin
10. Struan Walker
11. Ian Sloan
12. Jack Turner
13. Samuel Ward
14. James Albery
15. Phillip Roper
16. James Mazarelo (GK)
17. Stuart Rushmere
18. Brendan Creed
19. David Goodfield
20. Oliver Payne (GK)
21. Liam Ansell
22. David Condon
23. Nicholas Bandurak
24. James Oates
26. James Gall
27. Liam Sanford
28. Lee Morton
29. Thomas Sorsby
30. Connor Williamson
31. William Calnan
33. Timothy Nurse
41. Calum Douglas (GK)
46. Samuel Taylor
50. Toby Reynolds-Cotterill (GK)
77. Alan Forsyth

== India ==
The following is the India squad for the 2023–24 FIH Pro League.

Head coach: (South Africa) Craig Fulton

1. Prashant Chauhan (GK)
2. Dilpreet Singh
4. Jarmanpreet Singh
5. Abhishek
6. Surender Kumar
7. Manpreet Singh
8. Hardik Singh
9. Gurjant Singh
10. Simranjeet Singh
11. Mandeep Singh
12. Krishan Bahadur Pathak (GK)
13. Harmanpreet Singh (C)
14. Lalit Upadhyay
15. Nilam Xess
16. P. R. Sreejesh (GK)
17. Sumit
18. Nilakanta Sharma
21. Shamsher Singh
22. Varun Kumar
23. Gurinder Singh
25. Raj Kumar Pal
27. Akashdeep Singh
29. Rabichandra Moirangthem
30. Amit Rohidas
31. Jugraj Singh
32. Vivek Prasad
34. Sukhjeet Singh
35. Mohammed Raheel Mouseen
39. Maninder Singh
44. Mandeep Mor
47. Yashdeep Siwach
48. Dipsan Tirkey
49. Manjeet (GK)
50. Selvam Karthi
52. Pawan Rajbhar
70. Sanjay
71. Pawan Malik (GK)
77. Suraj Karkera (GK)

== Ireland ==
The following is the Ireland squad for the 2023–24 FIH Pro League.

Head coach: Mark Tumilty

1. David Harte (GK)
2. James Carr (GK)
3. Charles Rowe
4. Luke Witherow
6. Luke Madeley
7. Timothy Cross
8. John McKee
9. Matthew Nelson
10. Daragh Walsh
11. Callum Robson
12. Kevin O'Dea
15. Kyle Marshall
16. Shane O'Donoghue (C)
17. Sean Murray (C)
18. Mark McNeills
19. Peter McKibbin
20. Jeremy Duncan
21. James Milliken (GK)
22. Michael Robson
23. Benjamin Pasley
24. Benjamin Walker
25. Jonathan Lynch
26. Peter Brown
27. Benjamin Nelson
28. Lee Cole
29. Louis Rowe
30. Mark Ingram (GK)
33. Rex Dunlop
35. Conor Empey
36. Sam Hyland
37. Oliver Kidd
39. Fergus Gibson
40. Benjamin Johnson
44. Mark Samuel
45. Nicholas Page
49. Alistair Empey

== Netherlands ==
The following is the Netherlands squad for the 2023–24 FIH Pro League.

Head coach: Jeroen Delmée

1. Maurits Visser (GK)
2. Jip Janssen
3. Sheldon Schouten
4. Lars Balk
6. Jonas de Geus
7. Thijs van Dam
8. Thierry Brinkman (C)
9. Seve van Ass
10. Jorrit Croon
11. Terrance Pieters
12. Justen Blok
13. Jasper Brinkman
14. Derck de Vilder
15. David Huussen
16. Floris Wortelboer
17. Teun Beins
18. Boris Burkhardt
19. Tjep Hoedemakers
20. Derk Meijer (GK)
22. Koen Bijen
23. Joep de Mol
24. Steijn van Heijningen
25. Max de Bie
26. Pirmin Blaak (GK)
29. Tijmen Reyenga
41. Marlun Landbrug
42. Joep Troost
45. Pepijn Reyenga
51. Duco Telgenkamp
77. Floris Middendorp

== Spain ==
The following is the Spain squad for the 2023–24 FIH Pro League.

Head coach: (Argentina) Maximiliano Caldas

2. Alejandro Alonso
6. Xavier Gispert
7. Enrique González
8. Marc Recasens
9. Álvaro Iglesias
10. José Basterra
12. Marc Reyné
14. Marc Miralles (C)
15. Jordi Bonastre
16. Rafael Revilla Álvarez (GK)
17. Pepe Cunill
18. Joaquín Menini
20. Pau Cunill
21. Ádrian Rafi (GK)
23. Marc Vizcaino
24. Ignacio Rodríguez
26. César Curiel (GK)
29. Gerard Clapés
30. Antonio Sanz
32. Andreas Rafi
35. Pere Amat
42. Luis Calzado (GK)
61. Bruno Font
90. Borja Lacalle
99. Rafael Vilallonga
