= 2019 Men's Ready Steady Tokyo Hockey Tournament squads =

This article displays the rosters for the teams competing at the 2019 Ready Steady Tokyo men's field hockey test event. Each team had to submit 18 players.

== Teams ==
=== India ===
The following 16 players were named in the India squad, which was announced on 25 July.

Head Coach: (Australia) Graham Reid

2. Suraj Karkera (GK)
5. Kothajit Khadangbam
8. Hardik Singh
9. Gurjant Singh
11. Mandeep Singh
13. Harmanpreet Singh (C)
15. Nilam Xess
18. Nilakanta Sharma
19. Ashis Topno
20. Gursahibjit Singh
21. Shamsher Singh
22. Varun Kumar
23. Gurinder Singh
24. S.V. Sunil
25. Jaskaran Singh
26. Vivek Prasad

=== Japan ===
The following 16 players were named in the Japan squad, which was announced on 10 August.

Head Coach: (Netherlands) Siegfried Aikman

1. Koji Yamasaki
4. Genki Mitani
5. Seren Tanaka
6. Hiromasa Ochiai
7. Kazuma Murata
9. Kenta Tanaka
12. Yuma Nagai
13. Manabu Yamashita (C)
17. Kentaro Fukuda
20. Masaki Ohashi
21. Hirotaka Wakuri
25. Shota Yamada
29. Hirotaka Zendana
30. Takashi Yoshikawa (GK)
31. Kota Watanbe
32. Yoshiki Kirishita

=== Malaysia ===
The following 18 players were named in the Malaysia squad.

Head Coach: (Netherlands) Roelant Oltmans

3. Norsyafiq Sumantri
5. Luqman Ahmad Shukran
6. Marhan Jalil
8. Ashran Hamsani
11. Syed Cholan
12. Sukri Mutalib (C)
14. Muhammad Mohd
15. Nabil Noor
16. Kumar Subramiam (GK)
18. Faiz Jali
20. Azuan Hasan
24. Aiman Rozemi
25. Najmi Jazlan
26. Shahril Saabah
27. Akhimullah Anuar
30. Firadus Rosdi

=== New Zealand ===
The following 16 players were named in the New Zealand squad, which was announced on 5 August.

Head Coach: (New Zealand) Darren Smith

2. Cory Bennett
4. Dane Lett
7. Nick Ross
8. Richard Joyce (GK)
11. Jacob Smith
12. Sam Lane
13. Marcus Child
16. Aidan Sarikaya
17. Nic Woods
21. Kane Russell
24. Arun Panchia
25. Shea McAleese
27. Stephen Jenness
29. Hugo Inglis (C)
30. George Muir
31. Hayden Phillips
