= 2024 in field hockey =

The following were field hockey events during 2024 throughout the world.

== FIH Pro League & Nations Cup ==
- December 6, 2023 – June 29: 2023–24 Women's FIH Pro League
- December 6, 2023 – June 30: 2023–24 Men's FIH Pro League
- May 31 – June 9: 2023–24 FIH Hockey Men's Nations Cup in (Poland) Gniezno
- June 6–9: 2023–24 FIH Hockey Women's Nations Cup in Spain

== World & Continental Championships ==
- January 24–27: 2024 Women's FIH Hockey5s World Cup in (Oman) Muscat
  - (gold) Netherlands, (silver) India, (bronze) Poland
- January 28–31: 2024 Men's FIH Hockey5s World Cup in Muscat
  - (gold) Netherlands, (silver) Malaysia, (bronze) Oman

== Domestic league seasons (incomplete) ==
Men

Nation	League	Champion	Second place	Title	Last honour
Belgium	2023–24 Men's Belgian Hockey League				
Germany	2023-24 Men's Feldhockey Bundesliga				
Great Britain	2023–24 Men's England Hockey League season				
Netherlands	2023–24 Men's Hoofdklasse Hockey				
