= 2024 Men's FIH Hockey5s World Cup =

First edition of Men's Hockey5s World Cup

2024 Men's Hockey5s World Cup
Tournament details
- Host country: Oman
- City: Muscat
- Dates: 28–31 January
- Teams: 16 (from 5 confederations)
- Venue(s): Hockey Oman Stadium, Al Amerat

Final positions
- Champions: Netherlands (1st title)
- Runner-up: Malaysia
- Third place: Oman

Tournament statistics
- Matches played: 48
- Goals scored: 507 (10.56 per match)
- Top scorer: (Pakistan) Waheed Rana (23 goals)
- Best player: (Malaysia) Akhimullah Anuar
- Best young player: (Pakistan) Hannan Shahid
- Best goalkeeper: (Netherlands) Joey van Walstijn

The 2024 Hockey5s World Cup was the first edition of the FIH Men's Hockey5s World Cup, the quadrennial world championship for men's national hockey5s teams. The event was organized by the FIH. It was held from 27 to 30 January 2024, in Muscat, Oman.

The Netherlands won the tournament after a win over Malaysia.

== Qualification ==
As the host, Oman was automatically qualified. The top three teams qualified in the five continental champions stated below:

=== Qualified teams ===
Dates	Event	Location	Quotas	Qualifier(s)
	Hosts	—N/a	1	Oman
6–9 July 2022	EuroHockey5s Championship	Walcz, Poland	3	~~Belgium~~^{[1]} Netherlands; Poland; Switzerland
10–14 July 2023	Oceania Cup	Gold Coast, Australia	3	Australia; New Zealand; Fiji
10–15 December 2022	African Hockey5s Qualifier	Ismailia, Egypt	3	Egypt; Kenya; Nigeria
4–11 June 2023	Pan American Hockey5s Cup	Kingston, Jamaica	3	Trinidad and Tobago; United States; Jamaica
29 August – 2 September 2023	Asian Hockey5s Qualifier	Salalah, Oman	3	India; Pakistan; Malaysia^{[2]}
Total			16	

^[1] – Following the event, Belgium withdrew from the tournament. After negotiations with the FIH, however, the Switzerland was included in the event in place of Belgium.
^[2] – Malaysia despite finishing fourth qualified since Oman who finished third already qualified as host.

== Draw ==
The draw was held on 3 September 2023.

== Preliminary round ==
All times are local (UTC+4).

=== Pool A ===
Pos	Team	Pld	W	D	L	GF	GA	GD	Pts	Qualification
1	Netherlands	3	3	0	0	19	12	+7	9	Medal round
2	Poland	3	2	0	1	18	15	+3	6	Medal round
3	Pakistan	3	1	0	2	21	18	+3	3	Classification round
4	Nigeria	3	0	0	3	13	26	−13	0	Classification round

Source: FIH
Rules for classification: 1) points; 2) matches won; 3) goal difference; 4) goals for; 5) head-to-head result; 6) field goals for.

28 January 2024
08:00

Netherlands	6–3	Poland
Van der Drift 2', 11'; De Wijn 9', 29'; Schouten 14'; Schop 21'	Report	Hołosyniuk 15'; Rutkowski 19'; Jarzembowski 30'

Umpires:
Darren Hubach (RSA)
Fatma Mahmoud (EGY)

28 January 2024
08:50

Pakistan	11–5	Nigeria
Rana 2', 2', 3', 8', 14'; Hayat 11'; Shahid 15', 21', 28', 29'; Liaqat 26'	Report	Solomon 13', 18'; Ibrahim 13'; Godwin 29'; John 30'

Umpires:
Timothy Sheahan (AUS)
Bhagyashree Agarwal (IND)

28 January 2024
14:40

Poland	7–2	Nigeria
Hołosyniuk 1'; Bembenek 2', 14', 14', 22'; Jarzembowski 21', 29'	Report	Solomon 20'; John 23'

Umpires:
Chor Ming Yeung (HKG)
Michelle Farnill (AUS)

28 January 2024
15:40

Pakistan	3–5	Netherlands
Ali 5'; Rana 16'; Abdullah 23'	Report	Schop 10', 21', 30'; Van der Drift 20'; Middendorp 25'

Umpires:
Benjamin Messerli (SUI)
Ilaria Amorosini (ITA)

29 January 2024
09:40

Netherlands	8–6	Nigeria
Middendorp 1'; Van der Drift 2'; Reyenga 4', 23'; Schop 6' van Aart 18', 28'; De Wijn 29'	Report	Patrick 9'; John 11'; Solomon 14', 15'; John 22', 30'

Umpires:
Nick Saunders (NZL)
Ana Faias (POR)

29 January 2024
10:30

Poland	8–7	Pakistan
Hołosyniuk 8'; Rutkowski 9', 22'; Bembenek 10'; Jarzembowski 18', 21'; Głowacki 28'; Nowakowski 28'	Report	Rana 13', 17', 23', 26', 30+'; Ali 14'; Liaqat 20'

Umpires:
Maarten Boxma (NED)
Ilaria Amorosini (ITA)

=== Pool B ===
Pos	Team	Pld	W	D	L	GF	GA	GD	Pts	Qualification
1	Egypt	3	3	0	0	27	9	+18	9	Medal round
2	India	3	2	0	1	28	9	+19	6	Medal round
3	Switzerland	3	1	0	2	8	22	−14	3	Classification round
4	Jamaica	3	0	0	3	6	29	−23	0	Classification round

Source: FIH
Rules for classification: 1) points; 2) matches won; 3) goal difference; 4) goals for; 5) head-to-head result; 6) field goals for.

28 January 2024
09:40

India	9–1	Switzerland
Mohammed 6', 12', 28'; Mandeep 11', 15'; Maninder 19', 22', 26', 28'	Report	G. Wyss-Chodat 24'

Umpires:
Maarten Boxma (NED)
Natalia Lodeiro (URU)

28 January 2024
10:30

Egypt	10–2	Jamaica
Nasr 4'; Edris 11', 25'; Atef 14'; Ragab 14', 15', 20'; Sayed 17'; El-Ganaini 18', 30'	Report	Reid 4'; Gordon 22'

Umpires:
Chor Ming Yeung (HKG)
Victoria Pazos (POR)

28 January 2024
16:30

Switzerland	6–4	Jamaica
G. Wyss-Chodat 5', 19', 24', 27'; Brönnimann 7', 23'	Report	Reid 9', 10'; Mitchell 25'; Gordon 30'

Umpires:
Darren Hubach (RSA)
Kim Yoon-seon (KOR)

28 January 2024
18:00

Egypt	8–6	India
Ragab 5', 9'; El-Ganaini 7', 25'; Sayed 12', 18'; El-Naggar 15', 19'	Report	Pawan 3', 21', 29'; Mohammed 14'; Uttam 25'; Manjeet 30'

Umpires:
Nick Saunders (NZL)
Michelle Farnill (AUS)

29 January 2024
08:00

India	13–0	Jamaica
Maninder 2', 2', 28', 29'; Uttam 5'; Manjeet 5', 24'; Pawan 9'; Gurjot 14'; Mohammed 16', 27'; Mandeep 23', 27'	Report

Umpires:
Jonathan Altamirano (MEX)
Natalia Lodeiro (URU)

29 January 2024
08:50

Switzerland	1–9	Egypt
Brönnimann 11'	Report	El-Ganaini 2', 20', 30'; Nasr 4', 11', 12'; Ragab 13', 21'; El-Naggar 24'

Umpires:
Timothy Sheahan (AUS)
Kim Yoon-seon (KOR)

=== Pool C ===
Pos	Team	Pld	W	D	L	GF	GA	GD	Pts	Qualification
1	Trinidad and Tobago	3	2	1	0	23	11	+12	7	Medal round
2	Kenya	3	2	0	1	15	12	+3	6	Medal round
3	New Zealand	3	1	0	2	11	22	−11	3	Classification round
4	Australia	3	0	1	2	14	18	−4	1	Classification round

Source: FIH
Rules for classification: 1) points; 2) matches won; 3) goal difference; 4) goals for; 5) head-to-head result; 6) field goals for.

28 January 2024
11:20

Australia	5–5	Trinidad and Tobago
Profke 4', 13'; Pace 25', 30'; Commins 28'	Report	Te. Marcano 3', 16', 22'; Ta. Marcano 9'; Daniel 11'

Umpires:
Jonathan Altamirano (MEX)
Fatma Mahmoud (EGY)

28 January 2024
12:10

New Zealand	1–6	Kenya
Bell-Kake 9'	Report	Wabwire 1'; Ludiali 6'; Kimtai 8'; Ademba 22', 28'; Wanganga 24'

Umpires:
Łukasz Zwierzchowski (POL)
Bhagyashree Agarwal (IND)

28 January 2024
18:50

Trinidad and Tobago	7–2	Kenya
Te. Marcano 2', 26', 30'; Pierre 5', 25'; Vieira 11'; Ta. Marcano 28'	Report	Ludiali 3'; Loise 26'

Umpires:
Łukasz Zwierzchowski (POL)
Ana Faias (POR)

28 January 2024
19:40

New Zealand	6–5	Australia
Iversen 19'; Dempster 20', 22', 23'; Chase 27'; Iversen 29'	Report	Sugio 2', 14'; Commins 12'; Kerr-Nelson 17'; Symons 17'

Umpires:
Jonathan Altamirano (MEX)
Kim Yoon-seon (KOR)

29 January 2024
13:00

Australia	4–7	Kenya
Sugio 9', 23'; Pace 26', 29'	Report	Ludiali 8', 20', 28'; Wabwire 10', 19', 22'; Masambu 18'

Umpires:
Chor Ming Yeung (HKG)
Fatma Mahmoud (EGY)

29 January 2024
13:50

Trinidad and Tobago	11–4	New Zealand
Te. Marcano 7', 9', 16', 17', 21'; Vieira 10'; Pierre 17'; Daniel 20'; Toussaint 25', 27'; Ta. Marcano 26'	Report	Bell-Kake 2', 23'; Iversen 13', 19'

Umpires:
Benjamin Messerli (SUI)
Victoria Pazos (POR)

=== Pool D ===
Pos	Team	Pld	W	D	L	GF	GA	GD	Pts	Qualification
1	Oman (H)	3	2	1	0	17	10	+7	7	Medal round
2	Malaysia	3	2	1	0	14	8	+6	7	Medal round
3	United States	3	1	0	2	20	12	+8	3	Classification round
4	Fiji	3	0	0	3	9	30	−21	0	Classification round

Source: FIH
Rules for classification: 1) points; 2) matches won; 3) goal difference; 4) goals for; 5) head-to-head result; 6) field goals for.
(H) Hosts

28 January 2024
13:00

Malaysia	3–3	Oman
Mat 9'; Anuar 12', 16'	Report	Al-Lawati 13'; Madit 22'; Al-Shaaibi 25'

Umpires:
Nick Saunders (NZL)
Natalia Lodeiro (URU)

28 January 2024
13:50

United States	14–3	Fiji
Montilla 3', 10', 22'; Barminski 6', 11'; Gandhi 8', 26'; Charasika 13', 17', 24'; Harris 20'; Motta 21', 28'; Cutone 23'	Report	Ravatu 5'; Dutta 6'; A. Smith 8'

Umpires:
Maarten Boxma (NED)
Victoria Pazos (PAR)

28 January 2024
20:30

United States	2–3	Malaysia
Harris 17', 27'	Report	Anuar 11', 25'; Mat 21'

Umpires:
Timothy Sheahan (AUS)
Ilaria Amorosini (ITA)

28 January 2024
21:20

Oman	8–3	Fiji
Madit 1'; Al-Lawati 9'; Barazahan 12', 24', 26'; Al-Shaaibi 15'; Al-Hasni 18'; Al-Fazari 23'	Report	Tora 21'; Dutta 22', 30'

Umpires:
Benjamin Messerli (SUI)
Ana Faias (POR)

29 January 2024
11:20

Malaysia	8–3	Fiji
Mat Ruslee 3'; Mat 8', 13'; Anuar 10', 15', 28'; Omar 22'; Kamaruddin 26'	Report	A. Smith 13'; Edwards 18'; H. Smith 28'

Umpires:
Darren Hubach (RSA)
Bhagyashree Agarwal (IND)

29 January 2024
12:10

Oman	6–4	United States
Al-Fazari 11'; Madit 14'; Al-Shaaibi 20', 29'; Bait Shamaiaa 22'; Al-Lawati 25'	Report	Barminski 10'; Harris 23', 23'; Gandhi 24'

Umpires:
Łukasz Zwierzchowski (POL)
Michelle Farnill (AUS)

== Classification round ==
=== Bracket ===
Quarter-finals
29 January
Pakistan	15
Jamaica	2
29 January
United States	3
Australia	6
29 January
Switzerland	5
Nigeria	4
29 January
New Zealand	6
Fiji	5

Crossover
30 January
Pakistan	11
Australia	3
30 January
Switzerland (p.s.o.)	7 (2)
New Zealand	7 (1)

Ninth place
31 January
Pakistan	10
Switzerland	1
Eleventh place
31 January
Australia	6
New Zealand	4

=== Ninth to sixteenth place quarter-finals ===
29 January 2024
18:00

Pakistan	15–2	Jamaica
Rana 2', 16', 18', 28', 29'; Shahid 2', 10', 15', 17', 17', 18', 22'; Hayat 12'; Liaqat 23'; Ali 25'	Report	Mitchell 15'; Gordon 20'

Umpires:
Michelle Farnill (AUS)
Ana Faias (POR)

29 January 2024
19:10

United States	3–6	Australia
Dhadwal 16'; Harris 19'; Charasika 21'	Report	Symons 2'; Kerr-Nelson 3', 15', 19'; Commins 4'; Profke 14'

Umpires:
Nick Saunders (NZL)
Bhagyashree Agarwal (IND)

29 January 2024
20:20

Switzerland	5–4	Nigeria
G. Wyss-Chodat 3', 30'; Gloor 19'; Krüsi 20'; Haberthür 28'	Report	Solomon 12'; John 15', 22', 24'

Umpires:
Chor Ming Yeung (HKG)
Natalia Lodeiro (URU)

29 January 2024
21:30

New Zealand	6–5	Fiji
Bell-Kake 9'; Iversen 14'; Murray 19'; Dempster 20'; Chase 24'; Raharuhi 26'	Report	Mock 4', 7'; Tora 9'; Dutta 14'; A. Smith 16'

Umpires:
Jonathan Altamirano (MEX)
Fatma Mahmoud (EGY)

=== Thirteenth to sixteenth place classification ===
Crossover
30 January
Jamaica	1
United States	8
30 January
Nigeria (p.s.o.)	5 (2)
Fiji	5 (1)

Thirteenth place
31 January
United States	10
Nigeria	9
Fifteenth place
31 January
Jamaica	2
Fiji	4

==== Crossover ====
30 January 2024
12:40

Jamaica	1–8	United States
Stephenson 21'	Report	Motta 6'; Harris 10', 18', 30'; Dhadwal 12'; Charasika 17'; Montilla 19', 21'

Umpires:
Bhagyashree Agarwal (IND)
Fatma Mahmoud (EGY)

30 January 2024
13:50

Nigeria	5–5	Fiji
Solomon 3', 20', 30'; Ibrahim 11'; John 15'	Report	Edwards 1', 7'; Ravatu 8'; Dutta 14'; Tora 26'
Penalties
John (penalty shoot-out missed); Godwin (penalty shoot-out scored); Solomon (penalty shoot-out scored)	2–1	(penalty shoot-out scored) Corrie; (penalty shoot-out missed) Dutta; (penalty shoot-out missed) Smith

Umpires:
Ana Faias (POR)
Jonathan Altamirano (MEX)

==== Fifteenth and sixteenth place ====
31 January 2024
09:00

Jamaica	2–4	Fiji
Gordon 15'; Stephenson 17'	Report	Mock 15', 26'; Corrie 26'; Dutta 26'

Umpires:
Łukasz Zwierzchowski (POL)
Maarten Boxma (NED)

==== Thirteenth and fourteenth place ====
31 January 2024
10:10

United States	10–9	Nigeria
Harris 9', 14', 25'; Montilla 10', 27', 28'; Charasika 13', 25'; Cutone 23'; Motta 26'	Report	Solomon 2', 25'; Godwin 15', 23', 24'; John 21', 27', 28', 30'

Umpires:
Natalia Lodeiro (URU)
Victoria Pazos (POR)

=== Ninth to twelfth place classification ===
==== Crossover ====
30 January 2024
15:00

Pakistan	11–3	Australia
Ali 5', 21'; Rana 6', 6', 13', 19', 23'; Hayat 19', 20'; Liaqat 27'; Yaqoob 28'	Report	Pace 8'; Kerr-Nelson 17'; Profke 29'

Umpires:
Nick Saunders (NZL)
Natalia Lodeiro (URU)

30 January 2024
16:10

Switzerland	7–7	New Zealand
M. Wyss-Chodat 9', 28'; G. Wyss-Chodat 14'; Brönnimann 18', 23', 29'; Krüsi 22'	Report	Murray 10'; Dempster 14', 24'; Iversen 16', 22'; Raharuhi 18'; Bell-Kake 26'
Penalties
Brönnimann (penalty shoot-out scored); Haberthür (penalty shoot-out scored)	2–1	(penalty shoot-out missed) Dempster; (penalty shoot-out scored) Iversen; (penalty shoot-out missed) Bell-Kake

Umpires:
Chor Ming Yeung (HKG)
Michelle Farnill (AUS)

==== Eleventh and twelfth place ====
31 January 2024
11:20

Australia	6–4	New Zealand
Kerr-Nelson 3', 10', 23'; Profke 11', 22'; Mcdonald 28'	Report	Iversen 1', 7'; Raharuhi 21'; Dempster 30'

Umpires:
Chor Ming Yeung (HKG)
Ilaria Amorosini (ITA)

==== Ninth and tenth place ====
31 January 2024
12:40

Pakistan	10–1	Switzerland
Liaqat 2', 4'; Hayat 6', 12', 30'; Shahid 10', 19'; Rana 22', 23'; Ali 30'	Report	Brönnimann 27'

Umpires:
Nick Saunders (NZL)
Jonathan Altamirano (MEX)

== Medal round ==
=== Bracket ===
Quarter-finals
30 January
Netherlands	7
India	4
30 January
Oman	5
Kenya	2
30 January
Egypt	1
Poland	2
30 January
Trinidad and Tobago	4
Malaysia	5

Semi-finals
30 January
Netherlands	5
Oman	3
30 January
Poland	3
Malaysia	4

Final
31 January
Netherlands	5
Malaysia	2
Third place
31 January
Oman	3
Poland	2

=== Quarter-finals ===
30 January 2024
08:00

Netherlands	7–4	India
De Wijn 4', 15+'; Schop 10', 26'; Middendorp 12'; Van Aart 13'; Reyenga 20'	Report	Mohammed 1', 7', 25'; Mandeep 11'

Umpires:
Łukasz Zwierzchowski (POL)
Victoria Pazos (POR)

30 January 2024
09:10

Oman	5–2	Kenya
Al-Fazari 9'; Al-Shaaibi 9', 20', 22'; Barazahan 16'	Report	Masambu 13', 23'

Umpires:
Maarten Boxma (NED)
Kim Yoon-seon (KOR)

30 January 2024
10:20

Egypt	1–2	Poland
Sayed 19'	Report	Bembenek 15'; Hołosyniuk 30+'

Umpires:
Benjamin Messerli (SUI)
Timothy Sheahan (AUS)

30 January 2024
11:30

Trinidad and Tobago	4–5	Malaysia
Toussaint 6'; Pierre 10'; Ta. Marcano 14'; Te. Marcano 30'	Report	Anuar 9'; Ahmad Shukran 12'; Mat Ruslee 17'; Kamaruddin 22'; Mat 25'

Umpires:
Darren Hubach (RSA)
Ilaria Amorosini (ITA)

=== Fifth to eighth place classification ===
Crossover
30 January
India	9
Kenya	4
30 January
Egypt	8
Trinidad and Tobago	5

Fifth place
31 January
India	6
Egypt	4
Seventh place
31 January
Kenya	7
Trinidad and Tobago	5

==== Crossover ====
30 January 2024
18:00

India	9–4	Kenya
Uttam 5', 25', 26'; Manjeet 6'; Pawan 10'; Mandeep 15'; Mohammed 17', 25'; Gurjot 28'	Report	Ademba 12', 14', 27'; Ludiali 24'

Umpires:
Benjamin Messerli (SUI)
Ilaria Amorosini (ITA)

30 January 2024
19:10

Egypt	8–5	Trinidad and Tobago
Ragab 5', 6', 20'; Edris 15', 22'; El-Ganaini 25'; Ragab 28'; Sayed 30'	Report	Toussaint 6'; Te. Marcano 11', 27'; Singh 21'; Ta. Marcano 28'

Umpires:
Łukasz Zwierzchowski (POL)
Victoria Pazos (PAR)

==== Seventh and eighth place ====
31 January 2024
13:50

Kenya	7–5	Trinidad and Tobago
Wabwire 5'; Masambu 6', 19', 30'; Ademba 10', 24'; Ludiali 16'	Report	Te. Marcano 2', 27'; Toussaint 11', 12', 24'

Umpires:
Kim Yoon-seon (KOR)
Bhagyashree Agarwal (IND)

==== Fifth and sixth place ====
31 January 2024
18:00

India	6–4	Egypt
Mohammed 8'; Pawan 9'; Maninder 10', 23'; Mandeep 11'; Uttam 13'	Report	Sayed 14', 19'; Ragab 23'; Atef 24'

Umpires:
Nick Saunders (NZL)
Michelle Farnill (AUS)

=== First to fourth place classification ===
==== Semi-finals ====
30 January 2024
20:20

Netherlands	5–3	Oman
Schop 3'; De Wijn 5', 17'; Van der Drift 7'; Van Aart 23'	Report	Al-Fazari 19'; Al-Shaaibi 21'; Al-Laun 30'

Umpires:
Timothy Sheahan (AUS)
Darren Hubach (RSA)

30 January 2024
21:30

Poland	3–4	Malaysia
Jarzembowski 9'; Rutkowski 27'; Hołosyniuk 30'	Report	Ishak 7'; Kamaruddin 19'; Anuar 22', 24'

Umpires:
Maarten Boxma (NED)
Kim Yoon-seon (KOR)

==== Third and fourth place ====
31 January 2024
19:10

Oman	3–2	Poland
Al-Fazari 7'; Madit 16'; Al-Lawati 26'	Report	Jarzembowski 14'; Hołosyniuk 25'

Umpires:
Maarten Boxma (NED)
Darren Hubach (RSA)

==== Final ====
31 January 2024
20:20

Netherlands	5–2	Malaysia
Van der Drift 1', 13'; Reyenga 6'; De Wijn 26'; Van Aart 28'	Report	Anuar 2'; Omar 16'

Umpires:
Benjamin Messerli (SUI)
Timothy Sheahan (AUS)

== Final standings ==
Rank	Team
1st place, gold medalist(s)	Netherlands
2nd place, silver medalist(s)	Malaysia
3rd place, bronze medalist(s)	Oman
4	Poland
5	India
6	Egypt
7	Kenya
8	Trinidad and Tobago
9	Pakistan
10	Switzerland
11	Australia
12	New Zealand
13	United States
14	Nigeria
15	Fiji
16	Jamaica

=== Awards ===
The following awards were given at the conclusion of the tournament.

Award	Player
Best player	(Malaysia) Akhimullah Anuar
Best goalkeeper	(Netherlands) Joey van Walstijn
Best junior player	(Pakistan) Hannan Shahid

== Goalscorers ==
There were 507 goals scored in 48 matches, for an average of 10.6 goals per match.

23 goals

- (Pakistan) Waheed Rana

16 goals

- (Trinidad and Tobago) Teague Marcano

13 goals

- (Pakistan) Hannan Shahid

12 goals

- (India) Mohammed Raheel
- (Nigeria) Peter John
- (United States) Patrick Harris

11 goals

- (Malaysia) Akhimullah Anuar
- (Nigeria) Dennis Solomon

10 goals

- (Egypt) Hossameldin Ragab
- (India) Maninder Singh

8 goals

- (Australia) Liam Kerr-Nelson
- (Egypt) Ahmed El-Ganaini
- (Netherlands) Sander de Wijn
- (Netherlands) Alexander Schop
- (New Zealand) Taimana Iversen
- (Oman) Khalid Al-Shaaibi
- (Switzerland) Gaël Wyss-Chodat
- (United States) Alberto Montilla

7 goals

- (Egypt) Amr Sayed
- (India) Mandeep Mor
- (Kenya) Moses Ademba
- (Kenya) Ivan Ludiali
- (Netherlands) Yannick van der Drift
- (New Zealand) Callum Dempster
- (Pakistan) Zikriya Hayat
- (Poland) Damian Jarzembowski
- (Switzerland) Elias Brönnimann
- (Trinidad and Tobago) Akim Toussaint
- (United States) Sekayi Charasika

6 goals

- (Australia) Zac Profke
- (Fiji) Leevan Dutta
- (India) Pawan Rajbhar
- (India) Uttam Singh
- (Kenya) Bethuel Masambu
- (Pakistan) Ghazanfar Ali
- (Pakistan) Arshad Liaqat
- (Poland) Jakub Hołosyniuk

5 goals

- (Australia) Mitchell Pace
- (Kenya) Danstone Wabwire
- (Netherlands) Jamie van Aart
- (Oman) Rashad Al-Fazari
- (Poland) Eryk Bembenek
- (Trinidad and Tobago) Tariq Marcano

4 goals

- (Australia) Jun Sugio
- (Egypt) Mohamed Edris
- (Egypt) Mohamed Nasr
- (Fiji) Krristofer Mock
- (India) Manjeet
- (Jamaica) Shemar Gordon
- (Malaysia) Syarman Mat
- (Netherlands) Pepijn Reyenga
- (Nigeria) Sunday Godwin
- (Oman) Fahad Al-Lawati
- (Oman) Asama Barazahan
- (Oman) Aiman Madit
- (Poland) Wojciech Rutkowski
- (Trinidad and Tobago) Mickel Pierre
- (United States) Henzor Motta

3 goals

- (Australia) Joshua Commins
- (Egypt) Ahmed El-Naggar
- (Fiji) Jerome Edwards
- (Fiji) Adrian Smith
- (Fiji) Tristan Tora
- (Jamaica) Kevon Reid
- (Malaysia) Kamarulzaman Kamaruddin
- (Netherlands) Lucas Middendorp
- (New Zealand) Mark Bell-Kake
- (New Zealand) Tuterangiwhakaea Raharuhi
- (United States) Michael Barminski
- (United States) Mohan Gandhi

2 goals

- (Australia) Kieran Symons
- (Egypt) Karim Atef
- (Egypt) Mostafa Ragab
- (Fiji) George Ravatu
- (India) Gurjot Singh
- (Jamaica) Kemar Mitchell
- (Jamaica) Nickoy Stephenson
- (Malaysia) Abid Sufian Mat Ruslee
- (Malaysia) Muhammad Omar
- (New Zealand) Jakob Bell-Kake
- (New Zealand) Te Chase
- (New Zealand) Mitchell Murray
- (Nigeria) Benjamin Ibrahim
- (Switzerland) Patrick Krüsi
- (Switzerland) Matthieu Wyss-Chodat
- (Trinidad and Tobago) Shaquille Daniel
- (Trinidad and Tobago) Jordan Vieira
- (United States) Gerald Cutone
- (United States) Ajai Dhadwal

1 goal

- (Australia) Nathan Mcdonald
- (Fiji) Terence Corrie
- (Fiji) Hector Smith
- (Kenya) Sheldon Kimtai
- (Kenya) Moses Loise
- (Kenya) Richard Wanganga
- (Malaysia) Luqman Ahmad Shukran
- (Malaysia) Arif Ishak
- (Malaysia) Firadus Rosdi
- (Netherlands) Sheldon Schouten
- (New Zealand) Herewini Iversen
- (Nigeria) Michael John
- (Nigeria) Isaac Patrick
- (Oman) Khalid Al-Hasni
- (Oman) Sami Al-Laun
- (Oman) Mahmood Bait Shamaiaa
- (Pakistan) Muhammad Abdullah
- (Pakistan) Murtaza Yaqoob
- (Poland) Tomasz Bembenek
- (Poland) Mikołaj Głowacki
- (Poland) Mateusz Nowakowski
- (Switzerland) Valentin Gloor
- (Switzerland) Oliver Haberthür
- (Trinidad and Tobago) Tarell Singh

Source: FIH

== See also ==
- 2024 Women's Hockey5s World Cup
