= Pawan Malik =

Indian field hockey player

Personal information
- Born: 1 May 2001 (age 25) Hisar, Haryana, India

Sport
- Country: India
- Sport: Field hockey
- Position: Goalkeeper
Youth career
- Years: Team
- 2018: India hockey5s U18
Senior career
| Years | Team | Caps | Goals |
| 2018–2024 | Hockey Haryana | 42 | - |
| 2024– | APL Pipers | 15 | - |
| 2026– | CAG | 7 | - |
National team
| Years | Team | Caps | Goals |
| 2019–21 | India U21 | 13 | - |
| 2022– | India hockey5s | 5 | - |
| 2022– | India | 18 | - |
Medal record
Men's field hockey hockey5s
Representing India
Pro League
| Bronze medal – third place | 2021–22 Rotterdam |
FIH Hockey5s
| Gold medal – first place | 2022 Lausanne |
Youth Olympic Games
| Silver medal – second place | 2018 Buenos Aires | Team |

Pawan Malik (born 1 May 2001) is an Indian field hockey player who plays as a goalkeeper for the Indian senior hockey team and Indian hockey5s team.

== Early life ==
Pawan hails from Hisar district of Haryana.

== Career ==
Pawan was part of the youth hockey5s team that won silver at the 2018 Youth Olympics. He made debut for the Indian junior team in 2019 at the eight nations invitational tournament in Spain and was part of the team that came second at the 2019 Sultan of Johor Cup.

Pawan saved two penalty corners and subsequent defections against Belgium in the quarter-final of the 2021 Junior World Cup as India won 1–0. He made his debut for the Indian senior team against Netherlands at the 2021–22 Men's FIH Pro League. He saved multiple attempts from Poland in the final of the 2022 Men's FIH Hockey5s as India won 6–4.

Pawan blocked the shots against Australia and Germany at the 2022–23 Men's FIH Pro League as India won the games by close margins. In the final against Belgium at the 2025 Sultan Azlan Shah Cup, Pawan made numerous saves though India lost by 0–1.
