= Gurjot Singh =

Indian field hockey player (born 2004)

Personal information
- Born: 22 November 2004 (age 21) Husainabad, Punjab, India

Sport
- Sport: Field hockey
- Position: Forward
- Club: Hockey Punjab
Senior career
Years	Team	Caps	Goals
–	Roundglass Punjab Club	-	-
–	Hockey Punjab	-	-
National team
Years	Team	Caps	Goals
2023–2025	India U21	29	(8)
2023–	India Hockey5s	13	(16)
2024–	India	7	(0)
Medal record
Men's field hockey
Representing India
Asian Champions Trophy
Gold medal – first place	2024 Hulunbuir
Hockey5s Asia Cup
Gold medal – first place	2023 Salalah
Junior World Cup
Bronze medal – third place	2025 Tamil Nadu
Junior Asia Cup
Gold medal – first place	2023 Salalah
Gold medal – first place	2024 Muscat

Gurjot Singh (born 22 November 2004) is an Indian field hockey player. He made his senior India debut in the 2024 Asian Champions Trophy. He plays as a forward for the Roundglass Hockey Academy, a Punjab Club, in the domestic tournaments and for UP Rudras in the Hockey India League.

== Early life ==
Singh is from Husainabad, Nakodar tehsil, Jalandhar district, Punjab. His father used to work as a milkman for a vendor and he has two sisters. He used to cycle to his school in Sarinh, about 4 km away from his village. When he was 10, while cycling back from school, he was hit by a bike and suffered a serious head injury. He took up hockey in Class 7 and played at a club in Sarinh till Class 12. Later, during the COVID pandemic, he worked in a shoe factory as a packaging boy to support his family. In 2021, he was selected for the Khalsa College team and after a brief stint, he joined Roundglass academy in July 2021, and trained under coach Balwinder Singh. He is studying for a degree in Bachelor of Physical Education.

== Career ==
Singh polished his game at the Roundglass academy and within two years made his junior India debut in the 2023 Sultan of Johor Cup, where India won a bronze. He played again in the 2024 Sultan of Johor Cup and ended up with another bronze medal. In 2023, he played in the men's Hockey 5s Asia Cup at Salalah, Oman, won by India. He was also part of the FIH men's Hockey 5s World Cup in 2024 at Oman where India finished fifth. He was selected for the senior India team in September 2024 which won the Asian Champions Trophy at Hulunbuir, China.
