= Dipsan Tirkey =

Indian field hockey player (born 1998)

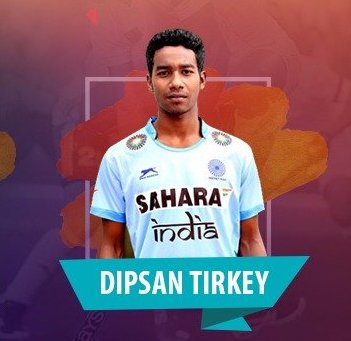

Personal information
- Born: 15 October 1998 (age 28) Sundergarh, Odisha, India

Sport
- Sport: Field hockey
- Position: Defender
- Club: BPCL
Senior career
Years	Team	Caps	Goals
–	BPCL	-	-
National team
Years	Team	Caps	Goals
2014–2016	India U21	11	(0)
2017–	India	37	(5)
2023–	India Hockey5s	7	(1)
Medal record
Men's field hockey
Representing India
Asia Cup
Gold medal – first place	2017 Dhaka
Bronze medal – third place	2022 Jakarta
Asian Champions Trophy
Bronze medal – third place	2021 Dhaka
Hockey World League
Bronze medal – third place	2016–17 Bhubaneswar	Team
Hockey5s Asia Cup
Gold medal – first place	2023 Salalah
Junior World Cup
Gold medal – first place	2016 Lucknow

Dipsan Tirkey (born 15 October 1998) is an Indian field hockey player who plays as a defender. He was the vice-captain of the Indian squad that won the 2016 Men's Hockey Junior World Cup.

== Life and career ==
Tirkey was born on 15 October 1998 in Saunamara village of Sundergarh district to a farmer father and housewife mother. Due to his family's difficult financial situation, he had to practice hockey with a borrowed hockey stick on the village roads. Inspired by his elder brother Prashant to take up the sport, he joined the State Sports Hostel in Rourkela in 2009 where he learned the game.

Tirkey first played for the India junior team at the 2014 Sultan of Johor Cup. The same year, he was picked by the Kalinga Lancers franchise in the Hockey India League. He also captained the Indian junior team for EurAsia Cup in Russia and England tour in July 2016.

Tirkey was the vice-captain and the youngest member of the Indian squad that went unbeaten en route to the title at the 2016 Men's Hockey Junior World Cup in Lucknow.
