= 2023 Men's Pan American Hockey5s Cup =

Field hockey 5s tournament

1st Pan American Hockey5s World Cup Qualifier
Tournament details
- Host country: Jamaica
- City: Kingston
- Dates: 4 June 2023–11 June 2023
- Teams: 8 (from 1 confederation)
- Venue: Mona Hockey Field

Final positions
- Champions: United States
- Runner-up: Trinidad and Tobago
- Third place: Jamaica

Tournament statistics
- Matches played: 24
- Goals scored: 140 (5.83 per match)
- Top scorer: (Trinidad and Tobago) Teague Marcano (17 goals)

The 1st Pan American Hockey5s World Cup Qualifier is the first edition of the Pan American Hockey5s World Cup Qualifier for the men's Hockey5s event at the FIH Hockey5s World Cup. It was held alongside the women's tournament in Kingston, Jamaica from 4 to 11 June 2023.

The winner, runner-up, and third-place team of the tournament qualified for the 2024 Hockey5s World Cup.

== Teams ==
- Costa Rica
- Guatemala
- Jamaica
- Panama
- Paraguay
- Puerto Rico
- Trinidad and Tobago
- United States

== Preliminary round ==
All times are local (UTC-05:00).

=== Pool A ===
Pos	Team	Pld	W	D	L	GF	GA	GD	Pts	Qualification
1	United States	3	3	0	0	12	3	+9	9	Semifinals
2	Jamaica	3	2	0	1	8	7	+1	6	Semifinals
3	Puerto Rico	3	1	0	2	6	8	−2	3	
4	Panama	3	0	0	3	3	11	−8	0	

Source: FIH
Rules for classification: 1) points; 2) matches won; 3) goal difference; 4) goals for; 5) head-to-head result; 6) field goals for.

4 June 2023
16:20

Puerto Rico	3–2	Panama
Fuentes Rios 1', 7', 18'	Report	Nuñez 5'; Miranda 13'

Umpires:
Lance Sarabia (USA)
Rodwell Borrayo (GUA)

4 June 2023
19:00

United States	4–2	Jamaica
Barminski 1'; Sidhu 6'; Dhadwal 14', 17'	Report	Vernon 11', 13'

Umpires:
Kevin George (TTO)
Jonathan Altamirano (MEX)

4 June 2023
16:20

Puerto Rico	1–3	United States
Agosto 14'	Report	Sidhu 2'; Barminski 15'; Sundeen 18'

Umpires:
Kevin George (TTO)
Natalia Lodeiro (URU)

4 June 2023
19:00

Jamaica	3–1	Panama
Gordon 2'; K. Reid 7'; Harris 17'	Report	Martinez 13'

Umpires:
Rodwel Borrayo (GUA)
Lance Sarabia (USA)

4 June 2023
17:40

United States	5–0	Panama
Sidhu 2'; Dhadwal 3'; Barminski 7', 17'; Motta 19'	Report

Umpires:
Rodwel Borrayo (GUA)
Natalia Lodeiro (URU)

4 June 2023
19:00

Jamaica	3–2	Puerto Rico
Haughton 4'; Stephenson 11'; Gordon 20'	Report	Fuentes Rios 8', 14'

Umpires:
Lance Sarabia (USA)
Joaquin Morini del Castillo (ARG)

=== Pool B ===
Pos	Team	Pld	W	D	L	GF	GA	GD	Pts	Qualification
1	Trinidad and Tobago	3	3	0	0	27	3	+24	9	Semifinals
2	Paraguay	3	2	0	1	9	13	−4	6	Semifinals
3	Guatemala	3	1	0	2	6	12	−6	3	
4	Costa Rica	3	0	0	3	1	15	−14	0	

Source: FIH
Rules for classification: 1) points; 2) matches won; 3) goal difference; 4) goals for; 5) head-to-head result; 6) field goals for.

4 June 2023
15:00

Guatemala	1–2	Paraguay
Calderón 12'	Report	Chamorro 8'; Rodriguez 20'

Umpires:
Jonathan Altamarino (MEX)
Kimani Airey (JAM)

4 June 2023
15:40

Trinidad and Tobago	5–1	Costa Rica
Vieira 3', 12'; Daniel 4'; Marcano 10'; Pierre 13'	Report	Iker 12'

Umpires:
Nathaniel Fuentes (PAN)
Joaquin Morini del Castillo(ARG)

4 June 2023
15:00

Paraguay	6–0	Costa Rica
Benitez 3', 9', 14'; Vera 4', 20'; Chamorro 14'	Report

Umpires:
Kimani Airey (JAM)
Joaquin Morini del Castillo (ARG)

4 June 2023
15:40

Trinidad and Tobago	10–1	Guatemala
Pierre 1', 11'; Marcano 4', 13', 17', 18'; Vieira 8'; Reynos 10'; Toussaint 16'; Phillip 18'	Report	Gochez 18'

Umpires:
Jonathan Altamirano (MEX)
Allison Mikelson (USA)

4 June 2023
16:20

Guatemala	4–0	Costa Rica
Calderón 4'; Gochez 15'; Depaz 17'; Anzueto 20'	Report

Umpires:
Morgan Ames (USA)
Kevin George (TTO)

4 June 2023
17:00

Paraguay	1–12	Trinidad and Tobago
Rodriguez 16'	Report	Marcano 1', 4', 5'; Pierre 11', 14', 15'; Toussaint 12', 13', 19', 19'; Reynos 17'; Grant 18'

Umpires:
Jonathan Altamirano (MEX)
Nathaniel Fuentes (PAN)

=== Second round ===
Fifth place
Puerto Rico	1
Guatemala	7
Seventh place
Costa Rica	1
Panama	2

Consolation semifinals
Costa Rica	1 (1)
Puerto Rico (p.s.o)	1 (2)
Guatemala	3
Panama	1

Quarterfinals
United States	4
Costa Rica	0
Paraguay (p.s.o)	3 (2)
Puerto Rico	3 (1)
Jamaica(p.s.o)	1 (3)
Guatemala	1 (2)
Trinidad and Tobago	10
Panama	1

Semifinals
United States	5
Paraguay	1
Jamaica	2
Trinidad and Tobago	9

Final
United States (p.s.o)	2 (3)
Trinidad and Tobago	2 (2)
Third place
Paraguay	2
Jamaica	5

==== Quarterfinals ====
9 June 2023
13:00

United States	4–0	Costa Rica
Barminski 6'; Sidhu 10', 12'; Sundeen 14'	Report

Umpires:
Jonathan Altamirano (MEX)
Kimani Airey (JAM)

9 June 2023
13:45

Paraguay	3–3	Puerto Rico
Vera 4', 10', 20'	Report	R. Rivera 9'; Fuentes Rios 15'; K. Rivera 20'
Penalties
Elias (penalty shoot-out missed); Chamorro (penalty shoot-out scored); Benitez (penalty shoot-out scored)	2–1	(penalty shoot-out missed) Fuentes Rios; (penalty shoot-out missed) Rodriguez; (penalty shoot-out scored) Feliciano

Umpires:
Lance Sarabia (USA)
Nathaniel Fuentes (PAN)

9 June 2023
14:30

Jamaica	1–1	Guatemala
Stephenson 18'	Report	Palma 6'
Penalties
Vernon (penalty shoot-out missed); Haughton (penalty shoot-out scored); Stephenson (penalty shoot-out scored); Stephenson (penalty shoot-out scored)	3–2	(penalty shoot-out scored) Gonzalez; (penalty shoot-out scored) Villatoro; (penalty shoot-out missed) Brian Cardona; (penalty shoot-out missed) Gochez

Umpires:
Kevin George (TTO)
Joaquin Morini del Castillo (ARG)

9 June 2023
15:15

Trinidad and Tobago	10–1	Panama
Marcano 2', 11', 20'; Phillip 5'; Toussaint 7', 8', 20'; Vieira 8'; Pierre 13', 18'	Report	Miranda 5'

Umpires:
Rodwel Borrayo (GUA)
Natalia Lodeiro (URU)

==== Fifth to eighth place classification ====
===== Crossover =====
9 June 2023
17:00

Costa Rica	1–1	Puerto Rico
Solis 19'	Report	Fuentes Rios 13'
Penalties
Villalobos (penalty shoot-out missed); Iker (penalty shoot-out missed); Picado (penalty shoot-out scored); Picado (penalty shoot-out missed); Iker (penalty shoot-out missed)	1–2	(penalty shoot-out scored) Feliciano; (penalty shoot-out missed) Rodriguez; (penalty shoot-out missed) Fuentes Rios; (penalty shoot-out missed) Feliciano; (penalty shoot-out scored) Rodriguez

Umpires:
Rodwel Borrayo (GUA)
Nathaniel Fuentes (PAN)

9 June 2023
17:45

Guatemala	3–1	Panama
Calderón 1'; Villatoro 3', 15'	Report	Boodie 9'

Umpires:
Kimani Airey (JAM)
Allison Mikelson (USA)

===== Seventh and eighth place =====
11 June 2023
16:00

Costa Rica	1–2	Panama
Acosta 11'	Report	Gordon 18'; Martinez 20'

Umpires:
Morgan Ames (USA)
Diana Fuentes Castelo (MEX)

===== Fifth and sixth place =====
11 June 2023
16:45

Puerto Rico	1–7	Guatemala
Feliciano 6'	Report	Calderón 2', 18'; Gochez 4', 5'; Cardona 7'; Palma 19'; Depaz 20'

Umpires:
Nathaniel Fuentes (PAN)
Natalia Lodeiro (URU)

==== First to fourth place classification ====
===== Semi-finals =====
9 June 2023
18:30

United States	5–1	Paraguay
Dhadwal 4'; Sundeen 9', 20+'; Barminski 13'; Motta 18'	Report	Chamorro 16'

Umpires:
Jonathan Altamirano (MEX)
Kevin George (TTO)

9 June 2023
19:15

Jamaica	2–9	Trinidad and Tobago
Stephenson 10', 16'	Report	Marcano 3', 9', 11', 12', 13'; Phillip 6'; Toussaint 7', 20'; Pierre 14'

Umpires:
Joaquin Morini del Castillo (ARG)
Lance Sarabia (USA)

===== Third and fourth place =====
11 June 2023
17:30

Paraguay	2–5	Jamaica
Vera 11'; Benitez 14'	Report	Stephenson 3', 7', 12'; Gordon 9', 20'

Umpires:
Kevin George (TTO)
Lance Sarabia (USA)

===== Final =====
11 June 2023
18:15

United States	2–2	Trinidad and Tobago
Sundeen 10'; Barminski 18'	Report	Pierre 2'; Marcano 16'
Penalties
Dhadwal (penalty shoot-out scored); Barminski (penalty shoot-out missed); Sundeen (penalty shoot-out scored); Dhadwal (penalty shoot-out scored)	3–2	(penalty shoot-out scored) Marcano; (penalty shoot-out missed) Vieira; (penalty shoot-out scored) Pierre; (penalty shoot-out missed) Marcano

Umpires:
Joaquin Morini del Castillo (ARG)
Jonathan Altamirano (MEX)

== Final standing ==
Rank	Team
1st place, gold medalist(s)	United States
2nd place, silver medalist(s)	Trinidad and Tobago
3rd place, bronze medalist(s)	Jamaica
4	Paraguay
5	Guatemala
6	Puerto Rico
7	Panama
8	Costa Rica

Qualified for the 2024 World Cup

== See also ==
- 2023 Women's Pan American Hockey5s Cup
