= 2019 Sultan of Johor Cup =

Field hockey tournament

Tournament details
- Host country: Malaysia
- City: Johor Bahru
- Dates: 12–19 October
- Teams: 6 (from 3 confederations)
- Venue: Taman Daya Hockey Stadium

Final positions
- Champions: Great Britain (3rd title)
- Runner-up: India
- Third place: Malaysia

Tournament statistics
- Matches played: 18
- Goals scored: 82 (4.56 per match)
- Top scorer: (India) Shilanand Lakra (5 goals)
- Best player: (Japan) Kosei Kawabe

The 2019 Sultan of Johor Cup was the ninth edition of the Sultan of Johor Cup, an international men's under–21 field hockey tournament in Malaysia. It was held in Johor Bahru, Malaysia from 12 to 19 October 2019.

As in previous editions, a total of six teams competed for the title. All the teams that appeared in the 2018 edition returned for the 2019 tournament.

The defending champions Great Britain won the tournament for the third time by defeating India 2–1 in the final. The hosts Malaysia won the bronze medal by defeating Japan 2–1.

== Participating nations ==
Including the host nation, 6 teams competed in the tournament.

Team	Appearance	Last appearance	Previous best performance
Australia	8th	2018	1st (2016, 2017)
India	8th	2018	1st (2013, 2014)
Great Britain	7th	2018	1st (2015, 2018)
Japan	4th	2018	3rd (2016)
Malaysia	9th	2018	1st (2011)
New Zealand	6th	2018	4th (2014)

== Results ==
All times are in Malaysia Standard Time (UTC+8).

=== Preliminary round ===
Pos	Team	Pld	W	D	L	GF	GA	GD	Pts	Qualification
1	India	5	3	1	1	23	12	+11	10	Final
2	Great Britain	5	3	1	1	8	5	+3	10	Final
3	Malaysia (H)	5	2	1	2	7	13	−6	7	Third place game
4	Japan	5	2	0	3	12	12	0	6	Third place game
5	New Zealand	5	2	0	3	13	15	−2	6	Fifth place game
6	Australia	5	1	1	3	5	11	−6	4	Fifth place game

Source: FIH
Rules for classification: 1) points; 2) matches won; 3) goal difference; 4) goals for; 5) head-to-head result; 6) field goals scored.
(H) Hosts

12 October 2019
16:10

Australia	2–1	Japan
Hazell 3', 33'	Report	Niwa 15'

Umpires:
Nick Saunders (NZL)
Faqarudin Kadir (MAS)

12 October 2019
18:10

Great Britain	2–0	New Zealand
Russell 34'; Oates 58'	Report

Umpires:
Peter Kabaso (KEN)
Takashi Kurihara (JPN)

12 October 2019
20:40

India	4–2	Malaysia
Rahul 19'; Pratap 33'; Shilanand 39'; Uttam 60'	Report	Hassan 8'; Zainudin 9'

Umpires:
Sean Rapaport (RSA)
Alex Fedenczuk (SCO)

13 October 2019
16:10

Japan	1–2	Great Britain
Kawabe 21'	Report	Wall 13'; Park 47'

Umpires:
Peter Kabaso (KEN)
Matthew Claxton (AUS)

13 October 2019
18:10

India	8–2	New Zealand
Dilpreet 6'; Shilanand 14'; Sanjay 17', 22'; Mor 20'; Suman 45'; Pratap 50'; Sudeep 51'	Report	Thomas 28', 44'

Umpires:
Takashi Kurihara (JPN)
Alex Fedenczuk (SCO)

13 October 2019
20:40

Australia	1–1	Malaysia
McBride 58'	Report	A. Mamat 35'

Umpires:
Nick Saunders (NZL)
Sean Rapaport (RSA)

15 October 2019
16:10

Great Britain	1–0	Australia
Golden 6'	Report

Umpires:
Takashi Kurihara (JPN)
Faqarudin Kadir (MAS)

15 October 2019
18:10

Japan	4–3	India
W. Motsumoto 1'; Kawabe 22', 37'; Watanabe 33'	Report	Gursahibjit 31'; Sharda 38'; Pratap 53'

Umpires:
Sean Rapaport (RSA)
Palani Mariappan (MAS)

15 October 2019
20:40

New Zealand	6–0	Malaysia
Jackson 19'; Wyndham-Smith 23'; Edwards 26', 33', 47'; Thomas 45'	Report

Umpires:
Peter Kabaso (KEN)
Matthew Claxton (AUS)

16 October 2019
16:10

India	5–1	Australia
Shilanand 26', 29'; Dilpreet 44'; Gursahibjit 48'; Mor 50'	Report	Knight 57'

Umpires:
Peter Kabaso (KEN)
Palani Mariappan (MAS)

16 October 2019
18:10

Malaysia	1–0	Great Britain
Muhibddin 46'	Report

Umpires:
Nick Saunders (NZL)
Matthew Claxton (AUS)

16 October 2019
20:40

New Zealand	2–4	Japan
Wyndham-Smith 12'; Ulrich 19'	Report	K. Tamura 12', 32'; R. Tamura 33'; Ukai 44'

Umpires:
Alex Fedenczuk (SCO)
Faqarudin Kadir (MAS)

18 October 2019
16:10

Great Britain	3–3	India
Wall 27'; McConnell 32'; Ramshaw 59'	Report	Shilanand 48'; Mor 51'; Sharda 57'

Umpires:
Takashi Kurihara (JPN)
Sean Rapaport (RSA)

18 October 2019
18:10

Malaysia	3–2	Japan
Zainudin 5'; Azahar 42', 50'	Report	Ukai 8'; Tamekuni 12'

Umpires:
Alex Fedenczuk (SCO)
Nick Saunders (NZL)

18 October 2019
20:40

Australia	1–3	New Zealand
Coates 60'	Report	Wyndham-Smith 23'; Neild 31'; Ulrich 33'

Umpires:
Faqarudin Kadir (MAS)
Palani Mariappan (MAS)

=== Classification round ===
==== Fifth and sixth place ====
19 October 2019
15:40

New Zealand	2–4	Australia
Ulrich 38'; Thomas 56'	Report	McBride 13', 38'; Busiko 15', 27'

Umpires:
Palani Mariappan (MAS)
Takashi Kurihara (JPN)

==== Third and fourth place ====
19 October 2019
18:10

Malaysia	3–2	Japan
Akhimullah 14'; A. Mamat 18'; Hassan 37'	Report	R. Tamura 23'; K. Tamura 57'

Umpires:
Alex Fedenczuk (SCO)
Matthew Claxton (AUS)

==== Final ====
19 October 2019
20:40

India	1–2	Great Britain
Gursahibjit 49'	Report	Rushmere 50', 60'

Umpires:
Peter Kabaso (KEN)
Nick Saunders (NZL)

== Statistics ==
=== Final standings ===
1. Great Britain
2. India
3. Malaysia
4. Japan
5. Australia
6. New Zealand

=== Awards ===
The following awards were given at the conclusion of the tournament.

Player of the tournament	Goalkeeper of the tournament	Top goalscorer
(Japan) Kosei Kawabe	(United Kingdom) Oliver Payne	(India) Shilanand Lakra

=== Goalscorers ===
There were 82 goals scored in 18 matches, for an average of 4.56 goals per match.

5 goals

- (India) Shilanand Lakra

4 goals

- (New Zealand) Dylan Thomas

3 goals

- (Australia) Daniel McBride
- (India) Pratap Lakra
- (India) Mandeep Mor
- (India) Gursahibjit Singh
- (Japan) Kosei Kawabe
- (Japan) Keigo Tamura
- (New Zealand) Benji Edwards
- (New Zealand) Charl Ulrich
- (New Zealand) Maks Wyndham-Smith

2 goals

- (Australia) Lachlan Busiko
- (Australia) Ehren Hazell
- (United Kingdom) Stuart Rushmere
- (United Kingdom) Ioan Wall
- (India) Sanjay
- (India) Dilpreet Singh
- (India) Sharda Nand Tiwari
- (Japan) Riku Tamura
- (Japan) Sota Ukai
- (Malaysia) Amirul Azahar
- (Malaysia) Muhammad Hassan
- (Malaysia) Adam Mamat
- (Malaysia) Muhammad Zainudin

1 goal

- (Australia) Patrick Coates
- (Australia) Aaron Knight
- (United Kingdom) Jamie Golden
- (United Kingdom) Andrew McConnell
- (United Kingdom) James Oates
- (United Kingdom) Nicholas Park
- (United Kingdom) Matthew Ramshaw
- (United Kingdom) Thomas Russell
- (India) Suman Beck
- (India) Sudeep Chirmako
- (India) Rahul Rajbhar
- (India) Uttam Singh
- (Japan) Wataru Matsumoto
- (Japan) Takuma Niwa
- (Japan) Ryuji Tamekuni
- (Japan) Keita Watanabe
- (Malaysia) Akhimullah Anuar
- (Malaysia) Muhibddin Moharam
- (New Zealand) Moss Jackson
- (New Zealand) Tim Neild

Source: FIH

== See also ==
- 2019 Sultan Azlan Shah Cup
