= Akhimullah Anuar =

Malaysian field hockey player

Personal information
- Full name: Mohamad Akhimullah Anuar Esook
- Born: 2 May 2000 (age 26) Kemaman, Terengganu, Malaysia
- Height: 173 cm (5 ft 8 in)
- Weight: 63 kg (139 lb)

Sport
- Sport: Field hockey
- Position: Forward
Senior career
Years	Team	Caps	Goals
–	Tenaga Nasional Berhad	-	-
National team
Years	Team	Caps	Goals
2016–2021	Malaysia U–21	21	(10)
2019–	Malaysia	68	(29)
2022–	Malaysia Hockey5s	23	(40)
Medal record
Men's field hockey
Representing Malaysia
Asian Cup
Bronze medal – third place	2025 Rajgir	Team
FIH Hockey Series
Silver medal – second place	2018–19 Kuala Lumpur	Team
Sultan of Johor Cup
Bronze medal – third place	2019 Johor Bahru	Team
Men's hockey5s
FIH Hockey5s World Cup
Silver medal – second place	2024 Muscat	Team
SEA Games
Gold medal – first place	2025 Bangkok	Team
Youth Olympic Games
Gold medal – first place	2018 Buenos Aires	Team

Mohamad Akhimullah Anuar Esook (born 2 May 2000) is a Malaysian field hockey and hockey5s player.

== Field hockey ==
=== Domestic league ===
In the Malaysia Hockey League, Akhimullah represents Tenaga Nasional Berhad.

=== Under–21 ===
Akhimullah made his international debut at under–21 level. He represented the Malaysian U–21 team at three editions of the Sultan of Johor Cup in Johor Bahru, in 2016, 2017 and 2019.

He was named as captain of the national junior team in 2021, where he led the team at the FIH Junior World Cup in Bhubaneswar.

=== Malaysian Tigers ===
In 2019, Akhimullah received his first call-up to the Malaysian Tigers. He debuted in the squad's silver medal performance at the FIH Series Finals in Kuala Lumpur, where the side lost 3–2 to Canada.

Since his debut, Akhimullah has been a regular inclusion in the national squad, including a bronze medal win at the 2025 Asian Cup in Rajgir. He was named in the national squad for the 2026 FIH World Cup in Amsterdam and Wavre.

== Hockey5s ==
In addition to field hockey, Akhimullah is a prominent player in the hockey5s format for Malaysia.

=== Under–18 ===
Throughout 2018, Akhimullah was a member of the Malaysian Under–18 squad, appearing at the Asian Youth Olympic Games Qualifier in Bangkok, as well as the Youth Olympic Games in Buenos Aires. At the Youth Olympics he helped lead the side to a gold medal, finishing the tournament as highest goalscorer.

=== Senior national team ===
Following success with the Under–18 squad, Akhimullah came into the senior national hockey5s team in 2022.

He has competed in four major tournaments with the team, including the 2022 FIH Hockey5s tournament in Lausanne, the 2023 Hockey5s Asian Cup in Salalah, the 2024 FIH Hockey5s World Cup in Muscat and the 2025 SEA Games in Bangkok.

Most notable was Akhimullah's performance at the 2024 FIH Hockey5s World Cup, where he helped Malaysia to a silver medal and was named player of the tournament.
