= 2019 Men's Ready Steady Tokyo Hockey Tournament =

Ready Steady Tokyo
Tournament details
- Host country: Japan
- City: Tokyo
- Dates: 17–21 August
- Teams: 4 (from 2 confederations)
- Venue: Oi Hockey Stadium

Final positions
- Champions: India
- Runner-up: New Zealand
- Third place: Japan

Tournament statistics
- Matches played: 8
- Goals scored: 45 (5.63 per match)
- Top scorer: (India) Mandeep Singh (6 goals)

The 2019 Men's Ready Steady Tokyo Hockey Tournament was a men's field hockey tournament, consisting of a series of test matches. It was held in Tokyo, Japan, from August 17 to 21, 2019. The tournament served as a test event for the field hockey tournament at the 2020 Summer Olympics. The tournament featured four of the top nations in men's field hockey.

India won the tournament after defeating New Zealand 5–0 in the final. Japan finished in third place after defeating Malaysia 6–1 in the third place playoff.

== Competition format ==
The tournament featured the national teams of India, Malaysia, New Zealand, and the hosts, Japan, competing in a round-robin format, with each team playing each other once. Three points were awarded for a win, one for a draw, and none for a loss.

Country	June 2019 FIH Ranking	Best World Cup finish	Best Olympic Games finish
India	5	Champions (1975)	Champions (1928, 1932, 1936, 1948, 1952, 1956, 1964, 1980)
Japan	16	Ninth Place (1971, 2006)	Runners-up (1932)
Malaysia	12	Fourth Place (1975)	Eighth Place (1972, 1976)
New Zealand	8	Seventh place (1973, 1975, 1982, 2014)	Champions (1976)

== Results ==
=== Pool stage ===
Pos	Team	Pld	W	D	L	GF	GA	GD	Pts	Qualification
1	New Zealand	3	3	0	0	9	5	+4	9	Final
2	India	3	2	0	1	13	5	+8	6	Final
3	Japan (H)	3	1	0	2	9	11	−2	3	
4	Malaysia	3	0	0	3	2	12	−10	0	

Source: FIH
Rules for classification: 1) Points; 2) Goal difference; 3) Goals scored; 4) Games won; 5) Head-to-head.
(H) Hosts

17 August 2019
18:30

India	6–0	Malaysia
Gurinder 8'; Gursahibjit 18', 56'; Mandeep 33', 46'; Sunil 60'	Report

Umpires:
Hideki Kinoshita (JPN)
Martin Madden (SCO)

17 August 2019
19:00

New Zealand	4–3	Japan
Smith 17'; McAleese 19'; Russell 57'; Jenness 60'	Report	Yamasaki 34', 41'; Wakuri 39'

Umpires:
Lim Hong-Zhen (SGP)
Eric Koh (MAS)

18 August 2019
18:30

Malaysia	1–3	Japan
Nabil 37'	Report	Fukuda 26'; Murata 48'; Watanabe 49'

Umpires:
Adam Kearns (AUS)
Martin Madden (SCO)

18 August 2019
19:00

New Zealand	2–1	India
Smith 47'; Lane 60'	Report	Harmanpreet 2'

Umpires:
Hideki Kinoshita (JPN)
Eric Koh (MAS)

20 August 2019
09:30

Malaysia	1–3	New Zealand
Najmi 21'	Report	J. Panchia 29'; Woods 39'; Inglis 57'

Umpires:
Adam Kearns (AUS)
Hideki Kinoshita (JPN)

20 August 2019
11:45

India	6–3	Japan
Sharma 3'; Xess 7'; Mandeep 9', 29', 30'; Gurjant 41'	Report	Fukuda 25'; K. Tanaka 36'; Murata 52'

Umpires:
Martin Madden (SCO)
Lim Hong-Zhen (SGP)

=== Classification stage ===
==== Third and fourth place ====
21 August 2019
09:30

Japan	6–1	Malaysia
Zendana 32', 56'; Kirishita 39', 45+'; K. Tanaka 43'; Watanabe 44'	Report	Shahril 30'

Umpires:
Adam Kearns (AUS)
Lim Hong-Zhen (SGP)

==== Final ====
21 August 2019
12:00

New Zealand	0–5	India
	Report	Harmanpreet 7'; Shamsher 18'; Sharma 22'; Gursahibjit 26'; Mandeep 27'

Umpires:
Martin Madden (SCO)
Eric Koh (MAS)

== Statistics ==
=== Final standings ===
As per statistical convention in field hockey, matches decided in extra time are counted as wins and losses, while matches decided by penalty shoot-outs are counted as draws.

Pos	Team	Pld	W	D	L	GF	GA	GD	Pts	Final Result
1st place, gold medalist(s)	India	4	3	0	1	18	5	+13	9	Gold Medal
2nd place, silver medalist(s)	New Zealand	4	3	0	1	9	10	−1	9	Silver Medal
3rd place, bronze medalist(s)	Japan	4	2	0	2	15	12	+3	6	Bronze Medal
4	Malaysia	4	0	0	4	3	18	−15	0	Fourth Place

Source: FIH

=== Goalscorers ===
There were 45 goals scored in 8 matches, for an average of 5.62 goals per match.

6 goals

- (India) Mandeep Singh

3 goals

- (India) Gursahibjit Singh

2 goals

- (India) Nilakanta Sharma
- (India) Harmanpreet Singh
- (Japan) Kentaro Fukuda
- (Japan) Yoshiki Kirishita
- (Japan) Kazuma Murata
- (Japan) Kenta Tanaka
- (Japan) Kota Watanabe
- (Japan) Koji Yamasaki
- (Japan) Hirotaka Zendana
- (New Zealand) Jacob Smith

1 goal

- (India) Gurinder Singh
- (India) Gurjant Singh
- (India) Shamsher Singh
- (India) S.V. Sunil
- (India) Nilam Xess
- (Japan) Hirotaka Wakuri
- (Malaysia) Najmi Jazlan
- (Malaysia) Nabil Noor
- (Malaysia) Shahril Saabah
- (New Zealand) Hugo Inglis
- (New Zealand) Stephen Jenness
- (New Zealand) Sam Lane
- (New Zealand) Shea McAleese
- (New Zealand) Jared Panchia
- (New Zealand) Kane Russell
- (New Zealand) Nic Woods

Source: FIH
