= Maninder Singh (field hockey) =

Indian field hockey player

Personal information
- Born: 4 February 2001 (age 25) Bagrian, Sangrur district, Punjab, India

Sport
- Sport: Field hockey
- Position: Midfielder
- Club: State Bank of India
Youth career
- Years: Team
- 2018: India U18 Hockey5s
Senior career
| Years | Team | Caps | Goals |
| – | Hockey Chandigarh | - | - |
| – | State Bank of India | - | - |
National team
| Years | Team | Caps | Goals |
| 2017–2021 | India U21 | 20 | (4) |
| 2023– | India Hockey5s | 13 | (32) |
| 2022– | India | 9 | (2) |
Medal record
Men's field hockey hockey5s
Representing India
Asia Cup
| Gold medal – first place | 2022 Jakarta |
Hockey5s Asia Cup
| Gold medal – first place | 2023 Salalah |
Youth Olympic Games
| Silver medal – second place | 2018 Buenos Aires | Team |

Maninder Singh (born 4 February 2001) is an Indian field hockey player from Punjab. He made his senior India debut in the Hero Asia Cup 2022. He is a midfielder but also plays in the forwardline when needed. He plays for Chandigarh team and the Comptroller & Auditor General of India team in the domestic tournaments and for Soorma Hockey Club (Punjab) in the Hero Hockey India League 2024.

== Early life ==
Singh is from Bagrian village, Sangrur district, Punjab but moved to Chandigarh to improve his hockey. He joined the Chandigarh Hockey Academy in 2010.

== Career ==
Singh was part of the Indian under–21 teams that played the Sultan of Johor Cup at Johar Bahru which won a bronze medal in 2017 and a silver medal in 2019. In 2021, he played for the Indian team in the FIH Odisha Hockey Men's Junior World Cup at Bhubaneswar, where India finished fourth. Then, he made his senior India debut in June 2022 at the Hero Asia Cup at Jakarta. In 2024, he also played the FIH Hockey 5s World Cup at Oman, where India finished fifth. In June 2024, he was part of the Indian bench in the FIH Hockey Pro League 2023–24 but did not get a chance to play any matches.
