= 2018 Sultan of Johor Cup =

Field hockey tournament

Tournament details
- Host country: Malaysia
- City: Johor Bahru
- Dates: 6–13 October 2018
- Teams: 6
- Venue: Taman Daya Hockey Stadium

Final positions
- Champions: Great Britain (2nd title)
- Runner-up: India
- Third place: Australia

Tournament statistics
- Matches played: 18
- Goals scored: 94 (5.22 per match)
- Top scorer: (Australia) Damon Steffens (8 goals)

The 2018 Sultan of Johor Cup was the eighth edition of the Sultan of Johor Cup, an international men's under–21 field hockey tournament in Malaysia. It was held in Johor Bahru, Malaysia from 6 to 13 October 2018.

As in previous editions, a total of six teams competed for the title. The United States who competed in 2017 were absent from the tournament. The team was replaced by New Zealand.

== Participating nations ==
Including the host nation, 6 teams competed in the tournament.

- Australia
- Great Britain
- India
- Japan
- Malaysia (host nation)
- New Zealand

== Umpires ==
A total of eight umpires were appointed by the FIH and National Association to officiate the tournament.

- Harry Collinson (GBR)
- Michael Dutrieux (BEL)
- Aaron Gotting (AUS)
- Erskine Lee (NZL)
- Saifulnizam Mohamad Seftu (SGP)
- Norhisham Shaari (MAS)
- Gurbaj Singh (IND)
- Kenta Uziie (JPN)

== Results ==
All times are in Malaysia Standard Time (UTC+08:00).

=== Pool matches ===
Pos	Team	Pld	W	D	L	GF	GA	GD	Pts	Qualification
1	India	5	4	0	1	17	9	+8	12	Advance to Final
2	Great Britain	5	3	1	1	14	9	+5	10	Advance to Final
3	Australia	5	2	1	2	17	10	+7	7	Third-place match
4	Japan	5	2	1	2	6	6	0	7	Third-place match
5	Malaysia (H)	5	1	1	3	9	18	−9	4	Fifth-place match
6	New Zealand	5	0	2	3	10	21	−11	2	Fifth-place match

Source: FIH
Rules for classification: 1) points; 2) goal difference; 3) goals scored; 4) head-to-head result.
(H) Hosts

6 October 2018
16:05 MST

Great Britain	3–2	New Zealand
Ramshaw 4'; Golden 12'; Way 35'	Report	Wyndham-Smith 23'; Lane 33'

Umpires:
Norhisham Shaari (MAS)
Aaron Gotting (AUS)

6 October 2018
18:05 MST

Australia	1–2	Japan
Steffens 30'	Report	Fujishima 38'; Okihara 60'

Umpires:
Gurbaj Singh (IND)
Erskine Lee (NZL)

6 October 2018
20:35 MST

India	2–1	Malaysia
Harmanjit 12'; Lakra 46'	Report	Zaidi 47'

Umpires:
Michael Dutrieux (BEL)
Harry Collinson (GBR)

7 October 2018
16:05 MST

Japan	2–1	Great Britain
Kawabe 10'; Fujishima 29'	Report	Rushmere 30+'

Umpires:
Aaron Gotting (AUS)
Gurbaj Singh (IND)

7 October 2018
18:05 MST

India	7–1	New Zealand
P. Singh 6'; Lakra 15', 43'; Harmanjit 21'; Mohd 23'; Abhishek 50'; Mor 60'	Report	Hiha 53'

Umpires:
Kenta Uziie (JPN)
Saifulnizam Mohammad Seftu (SGP)

7 October 2018
20:35 MST

Australia	6–1	Malaysia
Beltz 8'; Rasmussen 26'; Steffens 44', 52'; J. Staines 45'; Green 53'	Report	Hasrin 37'

Umpires:
Harry Collinson (GBR)
Erskine Lee (NZL)

9 October 2018
16:05 MST

Great Britain	2–2	Australia
Golden 46', 47'	Report	Wotherspoon 24'; Ephraums 44'

Umpires:
Michael Dutrieux (BEL)
Norhisham Shaari (MAS)

9 October 2018
18:05 MST

Japan	0–1	India
	Report	Mor 42'

Umpires:
Harry Collinson (GBR)
Saifulnizam Mohd Seftu (SGP)

9 October 2018
20:35 MST

New Zealand	5–5	Malaysia
Andrews 11', 15', 21'; Hiha 30', 60'	Report	Mohamad 7'; Silverius 9'; Mamat 10'; Kamal 12'; Mohd 57'

Umpires:
Aaron Gotting (AUS)
Kenta Uziie (JPN)

10 October 2018
16:05 MST

India	5–4	Australia
Gursahibjit 5'; Haspreet 11'; Mor 14'; Vi. Singh 15'; Lakra 43'	Report	Steffens 18', 35', 59', 60'

Umpires:
Erskine Lee (NZL)
Saifulnizam Mohammad Seftu (SGP)

10 October 2018
18:05 MST

Malaysia	1–5	Great Britain
Ishak 11'	Report	West 6'; Oates 13'; Scott 26'; Russel 39'; Golden 45'

Umpires:
Kenta Uziie (JPN)
Michael Dutrieux (BEL)

10 October 2018
20:35 MST

New Zealand	2–2	Japan
Andrews 4', 42'	Report	Iseki 25'; Kawabe 28'

Umpires:
Gurbaj Singh (IND)
Norhisham Shaari (MAS)

12 October 2018
16:05 MST

India	2–3	Great Britain
Vi. Singh 5'; Lakra 20'	Report	Golden 6'; Rushmere 39'; Way 51'

Umpires:
Aaron Gotting (AUS)
Norhisham Shaari (MAS)

12 October 2018
18:05 MST

Malaysia	1–0	Japan
Abdu 58'	Report

Umpires:
Erskine Lee (NZL)
Gurbaj Singh (IND)

12 October 2018
20:35 MST

Australia	4–0	New Zealand
Wotherspoon 34'; J. Staines 46'; Steffens 52'; Green 59'	Report

Umpires:
Michael Dutrieux (BEL)
Harry Collinson (GBR)

=== Classification matches ===
==== Fifth and sixth place ====
13 October 2018
15:35 MST

Malaysia	6–3	New Zealand
Kamal 1', 12', 36', 60'; Khalid 23'; Zaidi 29'	Report	Wyndam-Smith 30'; Jeram 33'; Neild 46'

Umpires:
Aaron Gotting (AUS)
Kenta Uziie (JPN)

==== Third and fourth place ====
13 October 2018
18:05 MST

Australia	6–1	Japan
Gupte 5', 38'; B. Staines 9', 34'; Steffens 17'; J. Staines 58'	Report	Fujishima 29'

Umpires:
Harry Collinson (GBR)
Erskine Lee (NZL)

==== Final ====
13 October 2018
20:35 MST

India	2–3	Great Britain
Gursahibjit 4'; Abhishek 55'	Report	West 7'; Oates 39', 42'

Umpires:
Michael Dutrieux (BEL)
Saifulnizam Mohammad Seftu (SGP)

== Final ranking ==
As per statistical convention in field hockey, matches decided in extra time are counted as wins and losses, while matches decided by penalty shoot-outs are counted as draws.

Pos	Team	Pld	W	D	L	GF	GA	GD	Pts	Final Result
1st place, gold medalist(s)	Great Britain	6	4	1	1	17	11	+6	13	Gold Medal
2nd place, silver medalist(s)	India	6	4	0	2	19	12	+7	12	Silver Medal
3rd place, bronze medalist(s)	Australia	6	3	1	2	23	11	+12	10	Bronze Medal
4	Japan	6	2	1	3	7	12	−5	7	Fourth Place
5	Malaysia (H)	6	2	1	3	15	21	−6	7	Fifth place
6	New Zealand	6	0	2	4	13	27	−14	2	Sixth Place

Source: FIH
(H) Hosts

== Goalscorers ==
There were 94 goals scored in 18 matches, for an average of 5.22 goals per match.

9 goals

- (Australia) Damon Steffens

5 goals

- (United Kingdom) Cameron Golden
- (India) Shilanand Lakra
- (Malaysia) Abu Kamal Azrai
- (New Zealand) Reuben Andrews

3 goals

- (Australia) Jake Staines
- (United Kingdom) James Oates
- (India) Mandeep Mor
- (Japan) Raiki Fujishima
- (New Zealand) Samuel Hiha

2 goals

- (Australia) Coby Green
- (Australia) Niranjan Gupte
- (Australia) Benjamin Staines
- (Australia) Dylan Wotherspoon
- (United Kingdom) Edward Way
- (United Kingdom) Stuart Rushmere
- (United Kingdom) Daniel West
- (India) Abhishek Nain
- (India) Gursahibjit Singh
- (India) Harmanjit Singh
- (India) Vishnukant Singh
- (Japan) Kosei Kawabe
- (Malaysia) Muhammad Zaidi
- (New Zealand) Maks Wyndham-Smith

1 goal

- (Australia) Hayden Beltz
- (Australia) Nathan Ephraums
- (Australia) Alec Rasmussen
- (United Kingdom) Matthew Ramshaw
- (United Kingdom) Thomas Russell
- (United Kingdom) Duncan Scott
- (India) Faraz Mohamed
- (India) Haspreet Singh
- (India) Prabhjot Singh
- (Japan) Shoji Iseki
- (Japan) Soichiro Okihara
- (Malaysia) Mahuajir Abdu
- (Malaysia) Muhammad Hasrin
- (Malaysia) Muhammad Ishak
- (Malaysia) Muhammad Khalid
- (Malaysia) Adam Mamat
- (Malaysia) Muhammad Mohamad
- (Malaysia) Muhammad Mohd
- (Malaysia) Shello Silverius
- (New Zealand) Kalyan Jeram
- (New Zealand) Samuel Lane
- (New Zealand) Timothy Neild

Source: FIH
