= Children's Academy =

Coordinates: 19.185312°N 72.854285°E

Children's Academy Group of Schools
- Bachani Nagar, Malad (East), Ashok Nagar, Kandivali (East), Thakur Complex, Kandivali (East)

Information
- Type: Private
- Motto: Hard work & Discipline are our Tradition.
- Established: 1970
- Information: www.childrens-academy.in
- Board: I.C.S.E.

Children's Academy is a Mumbai-based chain of private co-educational English-medium day schools in Malad, Ashok Nagar and Kandivali in Mumbai; An IB board in Thane. The first school was founded in 1970 by Shri V.V. Bhat in Malad. Currently the schooling of pupils is through affiliations by choice of ICSE of Council for the Indian School Certificate Examinations, New Delhi. The three branches of the group are Children's Academy, Ashok Nagar and Children's Academy, Thakur Complex in Kandivali (East) and Children's Academy, Bachani Nagar in Malad (East). The schools caters to pupils from nursery levels to the standard 10th grade examinations. They have more than 8000 students studying in the three schools. The Educational World 2019-20 school rankings placed Children's Academy, Malad as the number one school in the North Mumbai zone while the Malad and Kandivali branches are listed among the top 10 schools in the Education World 2019-20 school rankings. All three schools have received numerous accolades.

== History ==
Founded in 1970, the Children's Academy group of schools owes its inception to the profound vision of its founder, the late Shri V.V. Bhat (15 June 1930 – 15 August 2001). Mr. V. V. Bhat, while working as an Inspector of Education for the BMC, noticed several shortcomings in schools that were not being addressed when he visited several schools around the city. Mr. V. V. Bhat had a vision of providing holistic and inclusive education to students.

In 1970, Mr. V. V. Bhat rented out five shops in a residential building named Ishwar Bhavan in Malad. Over a period of time and owing to continued success, demand for the school grew and Mr. V. V. Bhat rented and occupied all 20 of the rooms in Ishwar Bhawan. This led to the purchase of the property of the land at Bachani Nagar in 1979 which now houses the Malad Branch. Construction of the school was an arduous process due to permissions required from the BMC. In the meanwhile, classes were held on temporary barracks-like structure built on the plot. By 1987, students were partially moved into the new classrooms of Children's Academy, Bachani Nagar.

In 1988, a plot of land was purchased in Ashok Nagar, Kandivali East which now houses the Children's Academy, Ashok Nagar branch. In 1998, Children's Academy, Malad was expanded with the help of an annexe building in an adjacent plot. Along with the additional classrooms, it also hosts cultural and co-curricular activities.

Due to ever-increasing demand, property was acquired in Thakur Complex, Kandivali East and there, Children's Academy, Thakur Complex, began its operations in 2001.

The Education World 2019-20 school rankings placed Children's Academy, Malad as the number one school in the North Mumbai zone while the Malad and Kandivali branches are listed among the top 10 schools in the Education World 2019-20 school rankings.

The Hindustan Times Top Mumbai Schools 2019 rankings ranked Children's Academy, Malad and Children's Academy, Ashok Nagar among the top 10 schools of North Mumbai.

== Illustrious Alumni ==
- Suraj Karkera (goalkeeper, Indian hockey team)
- Mohsin Khan (Indian actor)
