= Suraj Karkera =

Indian field hockey player (born 1995)

Personal information
- Born: 14 October 1996 (age 30) Mumbai, Maharashtra, India

Sport
- Sport: Field hockey
- Position: Goalkeeper
Senior career
Years	Team	Caps	Goals
–	Services	-	-
–	Hockey Maharashtra	-	-
2024–	Team Gonasika	-	-
National team
Years	Team	Caps	Goals
2015–2016	India U21	1	(0)
2017–	India	109	(0)
2023–	India Hockey5s	12	(0)
Medal record
Men's field hockey
Representing India
Asian Games
Gold medal – first place	2026 Aichi-Nagoya
Asia Cup
Gold medal – first place	2017 Dhaka
Gold medal – first place	2025 Rajgir
Bronze medal – third place	2022 Jakarta
Asian Champions Trophy
Gold medal – first place	2024 Hulunbuir
Gold medal – first place	2026 Punjab
Bronze medal – third place	2021 Dhaka
Hockey World League
Bronze medal – third place	2016–17 Bhubaneswar	Team
Hockey5s Asia Cup
Gold medal – first place	2023 Salalah
Junior Asia Cup
Gold medal – first place	2015 Kuantan

Suraj Karkera (born 14 October 1995) is an Indian field hockey player who plays as a goalkeeper for the Indian national team.

== Early life ==
Karkera was born on 14 October 1995 in Bombay (now Mumbai). He did his schooling at Children's Academy in Malad and is pursuing a degree in commerce from the Rizvi College, as of 2017.

== Career ==
Karkera made his debut for the Indian junior team in 2015 and was a regular member of the team on several tours. He made his senior team debut the following year and was part of India's gold medal-winning squad at the 2017 Asia Cup. He was named the Goalkeeper of the Tournament at the 2021 Asian Champions Trophy where his team won the bronze medal.
