= 2023 Men's Asian Hockey5s World Cup Qualifier =

1st Asian Hockey5s World Cup Qualifier
Tournament details
- Host country: Oman
- City: Salalah
- Dates: 29 August 2023–2 September 2023
- Teams: 11 (from 1 confederation)
- Venue: Salalah Sports Complex

Final positions
- Champions: India (1st title)
- Runner-up: Pakistan
- Third place: Oman

Tournament statistics
- Matches played: 39
- Goals scored: 529 (13.56 per match)
- Top scorer: (Pakistan) Abdul Rana (27 goals)

The 1st Asian Hockey5s World Cup Qualifier (Men's Hockey5s Asia Cup) was the first edition of the Asian Hockey5s World Cup Qualifier for the men's Hockey5s event at the FIH Hockey5s World Cup and also the first edition of the Men's Hockey5s Asia Cup. It was held alongside the women's tournament in Salalah, Oman from 29 August to 2 September 2023.

The tournament's winner, runner-up, and third-placed teams qualified for the 2024 Hockey5s World Cup.

== Teams ==
- Afghanistan
- Bangladesh
- Hong Kong
- India
- Indonesia
- Iran
- Japan
- Kazakhstan
- Malaysia
- Oman
- Pakistan

== Challenger Group ==
Pos	Team	Pld	W	D	L	GF	GA	GD	Pts	Qualification
1	Iran	4	4	0	0	36	15	+21	12	Crossovers
2	Kazakhstan	4	3	0	1	42	20	+22	9	Crossovers
3	Indonesia	4	2	0	2	30	16	+14	6	9–11th place
4	Hong Kong	4	1	0	3	23	37	−14	3	9–11th place
5	Afghanistan	4	0	0	4	14	57	−43	0	9–11th place

Source: FIH
Rules for classification: 1) points; 2) matches won; 3) goal difference; 4) goals for; 5) head-to-head result; 6) field goals for.

29 August 2023
16:00

Hong Kong	2–7	Iran
	Report

29 August 2023
17:00

Indonesia	1–4	Kazakhstan
	Report

30 August 2023
10:00

Indonesia	3–5	Iran
	Report

30 August 2023
11:00

Afghanistan	3–19	Kazakhstan
	Report

30 August 2023
16:00

Kazakhstan	8–12	Iran
	Report

30 August 2023
17:00

Afghanistan	7–12	Hong Kong
	Report

31 August 2023
10:00

Indonesia	12–5	Hong Kong
	Report

31 August 2023
11:00

Iran	12–2	Afghanistan
	Report

31 August 2023
16:00

Hong Kong	4–11	Kazakhstan
	Report

31 August 2023
17:00

Afghanistan	2–14	Indonesia
	Report

== Elite Group ==
Pos	Team	Pld	W	D	L	GF	GA	GD	Pts	Qualification
1	Pakistan	5	4	1	0	60	20	+40	13	Semi-finals
2	India	5	4	0	1	73	14	+59	12	Semi-finals
3	Malaysia	5	3	1	1	48	23	+25	10	Crossovers
4	Bangladesh	5	2	0	3	22	43	−21	6	Crossovers
5	Oman (H)	5	1	0	4	24	35	−11	3	Crossovers
6	Japan	5	0	0	5	11	103	−92	0	Crossovers

Source: FIH
Rules for classification: 1) points; 2) matches won; 3) goal difference; 4) goals for; 5) head-to-head result; 6) field goals for.
(H) Hosts

29 August 2023
18:00

India	15–1	Bangladesh
	Report

29 August 2023
19:00

Pakistan	26–1	Japan
	Report

29 August 2023
20:00

Malaysia	10–4	Oman
	Report

30 August 2023
12:00

Bangladesh	6–15	Pakistan
	Report

30 August 2023
13:00

Malaysia	18–2	Japan
	Report

30 August 2023
14:00

India	12–2	Oman
	Report

30 August 2023
18:00

Bangladesh	5–10	Malaysia
	Report

30 August 2023
19:00

Pakistan	5–4	India
	Report

30 August 2023
20:00

Japan	4–14	Oman
	Report

31 August 2023
12:00

Japan	3–10	Bangladesh
	Report

31 August 2023
13:00

Malaysia	5–7	India
	Report

31 August 2023
14:00

Oman	4–9	Pakistan
	Report

31 August 2023
18:00

India	35–1	Japan
	Report

31 August 2023
19:00

Pakistan	5–5	Malaysia
	Report

31 August 2023
20:00

Oman	6–7	Bangladesh
	Report

== 9–11th Place ==
Pos	Team	Pld	W	D	L	GF	GA	GD	Pts
1	Indonesia	2	2	0	0	23	2	+21	6
2	Hong Kong	2	1	0	1	12	13	−1	3
3	Afghanistan	2	0	0	2	7	27	−20	0

Source: FIH
Rules for classification: 1) points; 2) matches won; 3) goal difference; 4) goals for; 5) head-to-head result; 6) field goals for.

1 September 2023
12:00

Indonesia	15–2	Afghanistan
	Report

1 September 2023
18:00

Hong Kong	0–8	Indonesia
	Report

2 September 2023
13:00

Afghanistan	5–12	Hong Kong
	Report

== Knockouts ==
=== Bracket ===
Crossover 1
1 September
Oman	1
Kazakhstan	0
1 September
Japan	1
Iran	10

Crossover 2
1 September
Bangladesh	3
Oman	5
1 September
Malaysia	6
Iran	1

Semi-finals
2 September
Pakistan	7
Oman	3
2 September
India	10
Malaysia	4

Final
2 September
Pakistan	4 (0)
India (p.s.o.)	4 (2)
Third place
2 September
Oman	5
Malaysia	4

=== Crossover 1 ===
1 September 2023
13:00

Japan	1–10	Iran
	Report

1 September 2023
14:00

Oman	1–0	Kazakhstan
	Report

=== Crossover 2 ===
1 September 2023
19:00

Bangladesh	3–5	Oman
	Report

1 September 2023
20:00

Malaysia	6–1	Iran
	Report

=== Semi-Finals ===
2 September 2023
11:00

Pakistan	7–3	Oman
Rana 1', 9', 12', 18', 30'; Liaqat 14', 19'	Report	Al Fazari 4'; Madit 11', 27'

2 September 2023
12:00

India	10–4	Malaysia
Maninder 2'; Mohammed 9', 16', 24', 28'; Pawan 13'; Sukhvinder 21'; Mandeep 22'; Jugraj 23'; Gurjot 29'	Report	Ismail 4'; Akhimullah 7', 19'; Muhamad D. 19'

=== 7/8th place game ===
2 September 2023
14:00

Kazakhstan	9–1	Japan
	Report

=== 5th/6th place game ===
2 September 2023
16:00

Iran	6–7	Bangladesh
	Report

=== Bronze medal match ===
2 September 2023
17:00

Oman	5–4	Malaysia
Madit 6', 19'; Al Shaaibi 11', 24'; Al Fazari 29'	Report	Kamarulzaman 7', 22'; Muhibddin 11'; Akhimullah 26'

=== Gold medal match ===
2 September 2023
18:00

Pakistan	4–4	India
Rehman 5'; Rana 13'; Hayat 14'; Liaqat 19'	Report	Jugraj 7'; Maninder 10'; Mohammed 19', 26'
Penalties
Liaqat (penalty shoot-out missed); Murtaza (penalty shoot-out missed)	0–2	(penalty shoot-out scored) Gurjot; (penalty shoot-out scored) Maninder

== Summary ==
Rank	Team	M	W	D	L	GF	GA	GD	Points
1	India	7	5	1	1	87	22	+65	16
2	Pakistan	7	5	2	0	71	27	+44	17
3	Oman	9	4	0	5	38	49	-14	12
4	Malaysia	8	4	1	3	62	39	+23	13
5	Bangladesh	7	3	0	4	32	54	-22	9
6	Iran	7	5	0	2	53	29	+24	15
7	Kazakhstan	6	4	0	2	51	22	+29	12
8	Japan	7	0	0	7	13	122	-109	0
9	Indonesia	6	4	0	2	53	18	+35	12
10	Hong Kong	6	2	0	4	35	50	-15	6
11	Afghanistan	6	0	0	6	21	84	-63	0

- Points:
1. Win: 3 Points
2. Draw: 1 Points
3. Lose: 0 Points

== Final standings ==
Position	Team
1st	India
2nd	Pakistan
3rd	Oman
4th	Malaysia
5th	Bangladesh
6th	Iran
7th	Kazakhstan
8th	Japan
9th	Indonesia
10th	Hong Kong
11th	Afghanistan

Qualified for the FIH Hockey5s World Cup.

== See also ==
- 2023 Women's Asian Hockey5s World Cup Qualifier
