= Rabichandra Singh Moirangthem =

Indian field hockey player

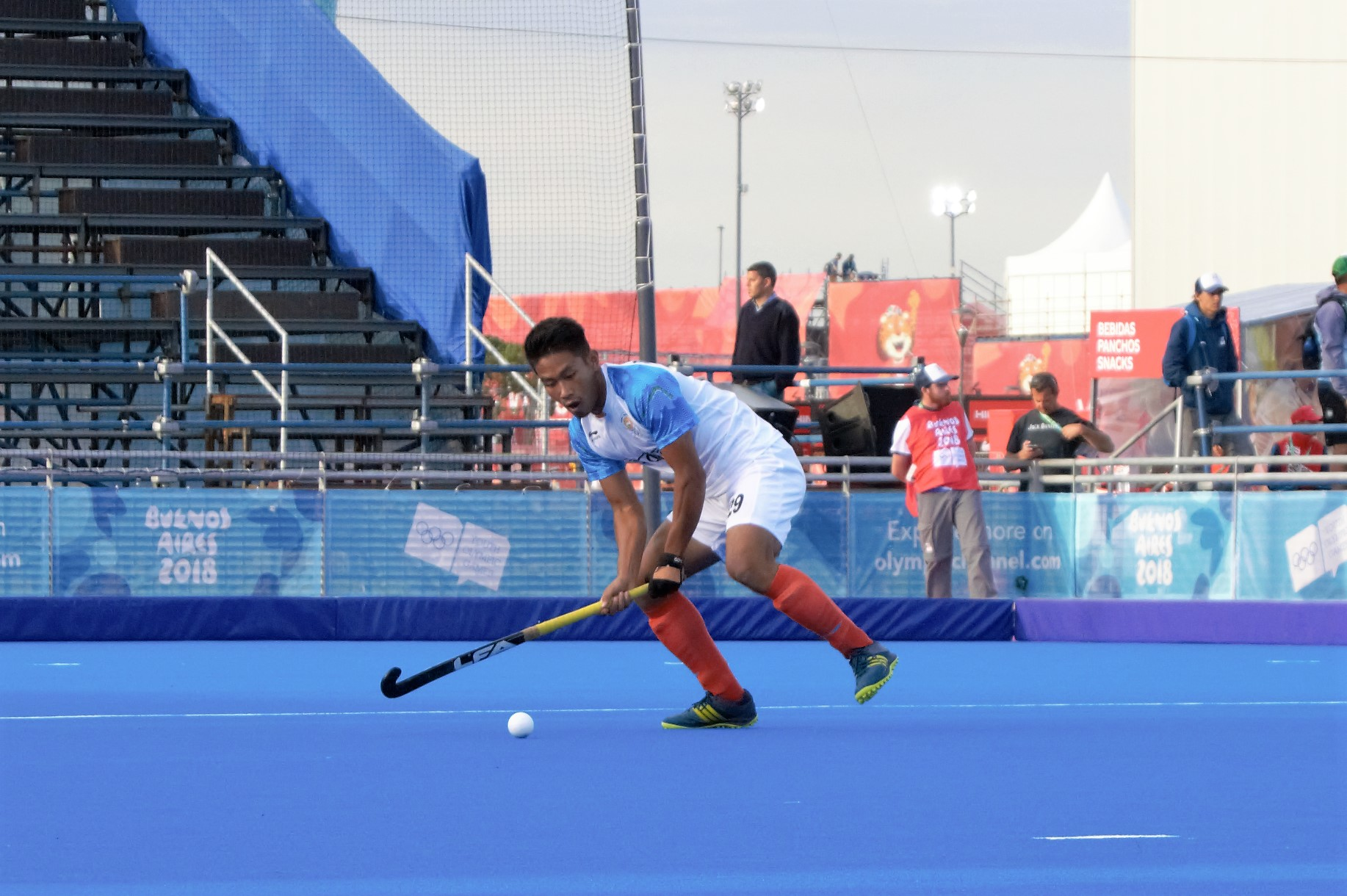
- 2018 Summer Youth Olympics

Personal information
- Full name: Rabichandra Singh Moirangthem
- Born: 3 August 2001 (age 25) Moirang, Manipur, India

Sport
- Sport: Field hockey
- Position: Midfielder
Youth career
- Years: Team
- 2016: India U18
- 2018: India U18 Hockey5's
Senior career
| Years | Team | Caps | Goals |
| – | Manipur Hockey | - | - |
| – | Petroleum Sports Promotion Board | - | - |
| 2024– | Kalinga Lancers | - | - |
National team
| Years | Team | Caps | Goals |
| 2022– | India Hockey5's | 5 | (2) |
| 2017–2021 | India U21 | 23 | (1) |
| 2022– | India | 27 | (0) |
Medal record
Men's field hockey Hockey5s
Representing India
Summer Youth Olympics
| Silver medal – second place | 2018 Buenos Aires | Team |
FIH Hockey5s
| Gold medal – first place | 2022 Lausanne |
Boys' Asia Cup
| Gold medal – first place | 2016 Dhaka |

Rabichandra Singh Moirangthem (Meitei: Moirangthem Rabichandra Singh, born 3 August 2001) is an Indian field hockey player from Manipur. He plays as a midfielder for the Indian national team and represents Petroleum Sports Promotion Board in the domestic tournaments.

== Early life ==
Rabichandra is from Thoya Leikai village in Moirang, Manipur. His is born to Bheigyabati Devi and late Nimai Singh. His father died in 2016. He was the youngest of four siblings. His elder brother Devid Singh, who was a state hockey player, joined Indian Army to meet the family's financial needs.

== Career ==
Rabichandra started playing hockey at the age of 10, when he attended a coaching camp at the All Moirang Hockey Association, Moirang. After the camp, the coach took his for trials at the Sports Authority of India training centre (SAI) hostel in Imphal, where he was selected as an inmate in 2012. He played for SAI, Imphal till 2016. During the Sub-Junior Nationals at Imphal, he was spotted to attend the selection trials for National Hockey Academy at Delhi. He passed the trials and joined the academy. After the Junior World Cup, he was given a three-year scholarship from 2019 to 2022 by the Petroleum Sports Promotion Board (PSPB). He also played the FIH Hockey5s and got a gold for India at Lausanne in June 2022. He was felicitated by the Manipur government after his return from Lausanne.

== Senior India career ==
Rabichandra was selected for the Senior India National camp in January 2022 and made the cut to make his Senior India debut two months later FIH Pro League tie against Argentina in March 2022. He also played for India in the Hockey 5s format and was part of the team that won gold at the inaugural edition of Hero Hockey five-a-side Championship at Lausanne in June 2022. He also represented senior India in the FIH Hockey Pro League (M) for the years 2021–22, 2022–23 and 2023–24.

== Junior India debut ==
Rabichandra was selected for the Junior national camp in 2017 and made his India debut at the Sultan of Johor Cup in October. He then played the 3rd Youth Olympic Games 2018 and was part of the Silver-winning Indian youth hockey5s team where he scored four goals. Later, he represented India in the FIH Odisha Hockey Men's Junior World Cup Bhubaneswar 2021, where India finished fourth.
