= Hockey5s at the 2025 SEA Games =

Events at 2025 SEA Games

- Venue: Royal Thai Air Force Hockey Stadium
- Location: Bangkok, Thailand
- Dates: 7–10 December 2025
- Nations: 4

The hockey5s competition at the 2025 SEA Games will take place at the Royal Thai Air Force Hockey Stadium, Bangkok, Thailand from 7 to 10 December 2025, marking the debut of the sport.

== Participating nations ==
Nation	Men	Women
Indonesia	Yes	Yes
Malaysia	Yes	Yes
Philippines	Yes	Yes
Thailand	Yes	Yes
Total: 4 NOCs	4	4

== Squads ==
=== Men's ===
Indonesia (INA)	Malaysia (MAS)	Philippines (PHI)	Thailand (THA)
Ardam; Asrul Alam; Achmad Fachrizal; Ahmad Firki Nur Hikmat; Fadli Muhamad; Alfandy Aly Surya Prastyo; Mochamad Fathur Rochman; Julius Rizhad Rumaropen; Ahdan Asasi Ramadhan Uno; Nurul Maulana Yusuf	Luqman Nul Hakim Ahmad Shukran; Adrian Andy Albert; Mohamad Akhimullah Anuar Esook; Muhammad Arif Shafie Ishak; Mohamad Kamarulzaman Kamaruddin; Muhammad Abid Sufian Mat Ruslee; Syarman Mat Tee; Muhammad Muhibuddin Moharam; Shafiq Ikhmal Daniel Suzaini; Mohamad Akmal Yusaini	Agostino Teofilo Alfieri; Miguelito Anabe II; Jhon Carlo Burga; Rolly Bustamante; Johnny Lou Demata; Eric Marc Dumlao; James Herera; Clayton John Lanting; Celfin Naz; Arvin Villagomez	Somrat Boontam; Kunakorn Jaitas; Worawut Kaeochianghwang; Pichai Kongman; Sarik Mahawak; Theppitak Namkhot; Kawin Nochbudsaba; Kroeksak Philata; Thanawat Srisanga; Wiros Yotsiri

=== Women's ===
Indonesia (INA)	Malaysia (MAS)	Philippines (PHI)	Thailand (THA)
Lispa; Innes Aditya; Selly Amalia Florentina; Nisa Indira; Erika Engelika Kbarek; Salma Maulani; Natasya Naiborhu; Asri Dewi Prasasti; Sri Rahayu; Tiarma Sirait	Nor Adilah Abdul Malik; Nur Shafika Ahmad Kamil; Surizan Awang Noh; Nurul Safiqah Mat Isa; Nur Qistina Syamimi Mohamad Roslan; Nurfatin Dizana Mohd Zaidi; Dian Nursyakira Najwa Al Wadqa Nazeri; Hasya Syahida Saifuddin; Wan Nur Syafiqah Syahirah Wan Nordin; Nur Anis Erysha Zamri	Lorraine Aldana; Mary Anthonnete Bual; Jaylene May Lumbo; Mariella Milan; Maribelle Natan; Veveca Oliva; Carla Jean Oquendo; Lasantha Mae Rivas; Maureen Agatha Rivera; Metchie Saludo; Christine Mae Talledo	Natthakarn Aunjai; Kunjira Inpa; Thanaphon Khamnon; Jenjira Kijpakdee; Suwapat Konthong; Alisa Narueangram; Sudarat Noo-Keaw; Anongnat Piresram; Supansa Samanso; Siraya Yimkrajang

== Medal summary ==
=== Medal table ===
* Host nation (Thailand)

Rank	Nation	Gold	Silver	Bronze	Total
1	Malaysia	1	1	0	2
2	Thailand*	1	0	1	2
3	Indonesia	0	1	1	2
4	Philippines	0	0	2	2
Totals (4 entries)		2	2	4	8

=== Medalists ===
Event	Gold	Silver	Bronze
Men's tournament	Malaysia (MAS)	Indonesia (INA)	Philippines (PHI)
Men's tournament	Malaysia (MAS)	Indonesia (INA)	Thailand (THA)
Women's tournament	Thailand (THA)	Malaysia (MAS)	Indonesia (INA)
Women's tournament	Thailand (THA)	Malaysia (MAS)	Philippines (PHI)

== Men's tournament ==
=== Preliminary round ===
==== Standings ====
Pos	Team	Pld	W	D	L	GF	GA	GD	Pts	Qualification
1	Malaysia	3	3	0	0	31	3	+28	9	Semi-finals
2	Thailand (H)	3	2	0	1	16	10	+6	6	Semi-finals
3	Indonesia	3	1	0	2	18	8	+10	3	Semi-finals
4	Philippines	3	0	0	3	0	44	−44	0	Semi-finals

Updated to match(es) played on 7 December 2025. Source: FIH
Rules for classification: 1) points; 2) matches won; 3) goal difference; 4) goals for; 5) head-to-head result; 6) field goals for.
(H) Hosts

==== Fixtures ====
7 December 2025
10:00

Philippines	0–11	Thailand
	Report	Mahawak 1', 7', 13', 17'; Namkhot; 5', 26', 27'; Kasonbua 6', 22', 29'; Yotsiri 30'

7 December 2025
11:00

Malaysia	4–2	Indonesia
	Report

7 December 2025
15:00

Indonesia	1–4	Thailand
	Report

7 December 2025
16:00

Malaysia	18–0	Philippines
	Report

8 December 2025
12:00

Indonesia	15–0	Philippines
	Report

8 December 2025
14:00

Malaysia	9–1	Thailand
	Report

=== Knockout tournament ===
==== Bracket ====
Semi-finals
10 December
Malaysia	10
Philippines	1
10 December
Thailand	3
Indonesia	8

Final
10 December
Malaysia	7
Indonesia	3

==== Semi-finals ====
10 December 2025
09:00

Malaysia	10–1	Philippines
	Report

10 December 2025
10:00

Thailand	3–8	Indonesia
	Report

==== Gold medal match ====
10 December 2025
14:30

Malaysia	7–3	Indonesia
	Report

== Women's tournament ==
=== Preliminary round ===
All times are Indochina Time (UTC+07:00)

Pos	Team	Pld	W	D	L	GF	GA	GD	Pts	Qualification
1	Malaysia	3	3	0	0	25	5	+20	9	Semifinals
2	Thailand	3	2	0	1	17	9	+8	6	Semifinals
3	Indonesia	3	1	0	2	12	11	+1	3	Semifinals
4	Philippines	3	0	0	3	0	29	−29	0	Semifinals

Source: 2025 SEA Games
Rules for classification: 1) points; 2) matches won; 3) goal difference; 4) goals for; 5) head-to-head result; 6) field goals for.

7 December 2025
12:00

Indonesia	3–5	Malaysia
	Report

7 December 2025
14:00

Philippines	0–9	Thailand
	Report

8 December 2025
10:00

Thailand	6–2	Indonesia
	Report

8 December 2025
11:00

Philippines	0–13	Malaysia
	Report

8 December 2025
15:00

Thailand	2–7	Malaysia
	Report

8 December 2025
16:00

Philippines	0–7	Indonesia
	Report

=== Knockout tournament ===
==== Bracket ====
Semi-finals
10 December
Malaysia	7
Philippines	0
10 December
Thailand	7
Indonesia	2

Final
10 December
Malaysia	1
Thailand	7

==== Semifinals ====
10 December 2025
11:00

Malaysia	7–0	Philippines
	Report

10 December 2025
12:00

Thailand	7–2	Indonesia
	Report

==== Gold medal match ====
10 December 2025
15:30

Malaysia	1–7	Thailand
	Report
