= Shilanand Lakra =

Indian field hockey player (born 1999)

Personal information
- Born: 5 May 1999 (age 27) Sundergarh district, Odisha, India

Sport
- Sport: Field hockey
- Position: Forward
- Club: HC Melbourne
Senior career
Years	Team	Caps	Goals
–	BPCL	-	-
2024–	HC Melbourne	-	-
National team
Years	Team	Caps	Goals
2017–2019	India U21	18	(12)
2018–	India	88	(24)
Medal record
Men's field hockey
Representing India
Asian Games
Gold medal – first place	2026 Aichi-Nagoya	Team
Asia Cup
Gold medal – first place	2025 Rajgir
Asian Champions Trophy
Gold medal – first place	2026 Punjab
Asian Champions Trophy
Bronze medal – third place	2021 Dhaka

Shilanand Lakra (born 5 May 1999) is an Indian field hockey player who plays as a forward for the Indian national team.

== Career ==
He made his national debut during the 2018 Sultan Azlan Shah Cup. He had previously played for the national junior team which won the bronze medal at the 2017 Sultan of Johor Cup. He was the top goalscorer at the 2019 Sultan of Johor Cup with five goals.

Lakra signed for the Hockey One club HC Melbourne in 2024 to play club hockey in Australia.
