= Mohammed Raheel Mouseen =

Indian field hockey player (born 1996)

Personal information
- Born: 20 December 1996 (age 29) Bangalore, Karnataka, India

Sport
- Sport: Field hockey
- Position: Midfielder
- Club: CAG
Senior career
Years	Team	Caps	Goals
–	CAG	-	-
National team
Years	Team	Caps	Goals
2022–	India	22	(2)
2022–	India Hockey5s	18	(43)
Medal record
Men's field hockey Hockey5s
Representing India
FIH Hockey5s
Gold medal – first place	2022 Lausanne
Hockey5s Asia Cup
Gold medal – first place	2023 Salalah
Asian Champions Trophy
Gold medal – first place	2024 Hulunbuir

Mohammed Raheel Mouseen (born 20 December 1996) is an Indian field hockey player. He plays as a mid-fielder for the Indian national team and represents Comptroller and Auditor General of India (CAG) team in the domestic tournaments.

== Early life ==
Mouseen is born in Bengaluru. His mother is Taj Begum and his father Mohammed Naseeruddin was a former national-level hockey player at Hindustan Aeronautics Limited (HAL). His grandfather Ameer Uddin was also a hockey player. His brother Mohammed Naeemuddin played for CAG team and was also called for the junior national camps but could not make it to the Indian team. Raheel joined the Sports Authority of India (SAI) hostel at Bengaluru in 2012 at the age of 15. He did his schooling at St. Joseph's School where he started his hockey and completed his B.Com. from Surana College, Bengaluru. His learnt his basics from coach Manohar Katke before training under coaches Ashwath and Prabhakar at the SAI hostel.

== Career ==
=== Domestic career ===
Mouseen started hockey early at St.Joseph's school and came through the ranks of sub-junior and junior hockey. While training at the Bengaluru SAI hostel, he played in the Junior Nationals and other domestic tournaments and was spotted by Air India. He played for SAI for eight years and for the airlines from 2016 for four years. With him as striker, Air India won the Lal Bahadur Shastri tournament title in 2019 at Amritsar. He was the highest scorer and was also declared as the Best Player of the tournament. The next year, he also excelled for the Air India team, which reached the finals of the Hockey India Senior Nationals in 2020. He won a bronze medal in the Nationals in 2021, representing Karnataka. In between in 2018 and 2019, he was called up for the Senior camp but failed to make it to the Indian team. He was also part of the Karnataka team that won the gold medal in the National Games in October 2022, that paved way for his debut for Senior India outdoor side. He was part of the Karnataka team which finished fourth at the Senior Nationals at Chennai in November 2023.

=== Senior India career ===
Mouseen made his senior India debut in the Hockey 5s format at the inaugural edition of Hero Hockey five-a-side Championship at Lausanne in June 2022, where India won the gold medal. He scored 10 goals at Lausanne and was declared as the Best Player of the tournament. He made his Senior India (outdoor) debut at the 2021-22 FIH Hockey Pro-League (M) in October 2022 and went on to play the league in the next year too. In between, he played the test matches against Australia in December 2022. In September 2023, he was the Indian vice-captain at the Men's Hockey 5s Asia Cup 2023 at Salalah, Malaysia. He also played the FIH Hockey Pro league for the third year - 2023–24. In 2024, he is part of the regular 33-member Indian core group of probables. In 2024, he also toured Australia with the Indian team for a Test series, which India lost.
