= Sanjay Rana =

Indian field hockey player (born 2001)

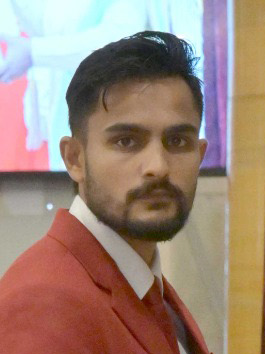
- Rana in 2025

Personal information
- Born: 5 May 2001 (age 25) Dabra, Hisar, Haryana, India

Sport
- Sport: Field hockey
- Position: Defender
Youth career
- Years: Team
- 2018: India U18 Hockey5s
Senior career
Years	Team	Caps	Goals
2021–	Hockey Haryana	6	6
2024–25	Kalinga Lancers	9	2
National team
Years	Team	Caps	Goals
2017–2021	India U21	23	(13)
2022–	India Hockey5s	5	(4)
2023–	India	110	(12)
Medal record
Men's field hockey
Representing India
Olympic Games
Bronze medal – third place	2024 Paris	Team
Asian Games
Gold medal – first place	2022 Hangzhou	Team
Gold medal – first place	2026 Aichi-Nagoya	Team
Pro League
Bronze medal – third place	2021–22
Asia Cup
Gold medal – first place	2025 Rajgir
Asian Champions Trophy
Gold medal – first place	2023 Chennai
Gold medal – first place	2024 Hulunbuir
Gold medal – first place	2026 Punjab
FIH Hockey5s
Gold medal – first place	2022 Lausanne
Youth Olympic Games
Silver medal – second place	2018 Buenos Aires	Team

Sanjay Rana (born 5 May 2001) is an Indian hockey player who plays as a defender. He is also one of the second drag flickers for the Indian team which won gold medals in the 2022 Asian Games and 2026 Asian Games. He was part of the Indian team that won a bronze medal at the 2024 Paris Olympics. In 2025, he was conferred with the Arjuna Award.

== Early life ==
Rana hails from Dabra village, near Hisar, in Haryana. He played for Chandigarh in his initial years as a junior but later represented Haryana state in the domestic events. From 2011 to 2017, he trained at the Chandigarh Hockey Academy. He is an alumnus of Chandigarh University.

== Career ==
- 2026: Rana was named as the captain of the senior team that participated in the Indian Centenary Hockey Series against New Zealand.
- Rana was part of the Indian hockey squads that won golds at the 2022 and 2026 Asian Games.
- 2023: In August, he was part of the Senior India team that played the Asian Champions Trophy in Chennai, India.
- 2023: In July, he represented the Senior Indian team at the 4-Nations Men's Invitational Tournament at Barcelona, Spain.
- 2022: In June, he made his senior India debut at the FIH Pro-League in London and Eindhoven.
- 2022: In June, he played for India in the Hockey5s format at the Hero FIH Hockey5s in Lausanne, Switzerland.
- 2021: In May, he played for Junior India team at the FIH Odisha Hockey Junior World Cup in Bhubaneswar, India.
- 2019: In June, he played for the Indian Under-21 team at the 8-Nations Invitational Tournament at Madrid, Spain.
- 2018: He was part of the Indian team that won silver at the 3rd Youth Olympic Games in Argentina.
