= Husainabad, Jalandhar =

Hussainabad
- village
- Nickname: sainabad
- Location in Punjab, India Hussainabad (India)
- Coordinates: 31.151845°N 75.563782°E
- Country: India
- State: Punjab
- District: Jalandhar
- Talukas: Nakodar

Languages
  - Official: Punjabi
  - Regional: Punjabi
- Time zone: UTC+5:30 (IST)
- PIN: 144043
- Telephone code: 0181
- Vehicle registration: PB- 08
- Nearest city: Nakodar

Hussainabad is a small village in Nakodar. Nakodar is a tehsil in the city Jalandhar of Indian state of Punjab.

== City Codes ==
Husainabad's STD code is 01821 and the post code is 144033.
