= Jacob Smith (field hockey) =

New Zealand field hockey player (born 1991)

Jake Smith
Personal information
- Born: 3 April 1991 (age 35) Wellington, New Zealand
- Height: 1.84 m (6 ft 0 in)

Sport
- Sport: Field hockey
- Position: Forward
Senior career
Years	Team	Caps	Goals
2016–2017	Herakles	-	-
2018–2019	Pinoké	-	-
–	Somerville	-	-
–	Auckland Indians	-	-
2024–2025	Surbiton	-	-
National team
Years	Team	Caps	Goals
2012–	New Zealand	89	(12)
Medal record
Men's field hockey
Representing New Zealand
Oceania Cup
Silver medal – second place	2019 Rockhampton
FIH World League
Silver medal – second place	2012–13 New Delhi	Team

Jacob Anthony Phillip Smith (born 3 April 1991) is a New Zealand field hockey player.

== Personal life ==
Smith was born and raised in Wellington, New Zealand.

== Career ==
=== Club level ===
In the New Zealand National Hockey League Smith plays for Auckland. During the 2018–19 season, Smith relocated to the Netherlands to play in the Dutch Hoofdklasse for Pinoké.

He played for Surbiton during the 2024–25 season.

=== National team ===
Smith made his national debut for the Black Sticks in 2012. Shortly after, he represented the team at his first major tournament, the Champions Trophy.

In 2014, Smith medalled for the first time with New Zealand at the 2012–13 FIH World League in New Delhi, India, where the team lost 2–7 to the Netherlands in the final.

Smith's most recent appearance for the team was during the inaugural tournament of the FIH Pro League in 2019. New Zealand finished in eighth and last place in the competition. He has also been named in the Black Sticks team for the 2019 Ready Steady Tokyo Olympic test event in Tokyo, Japan.

==== International goals ====
Goal	Date	Location	Opponent	Score	Result	Competition	Ref.
1	16 March 2013	Azlan Shah Stadium, Ipoh, Malaysia	Australia	1–0	2–3	2013 Sultan Azlan Shah Cup	
2	13 June 2013	HC Rotterdam, Rotterdam, Netherlands	Netherlands	3–1	3–3	2012–13 HWL Semi–finals	
3	19 November 2014	National Hockey Stadium, Wellington, New Zealand	Japan	2–0	3–3	Test Match	
4	19 November 2014	National Hockey Stadium, Wellington, New Zealand	Japan	3–0	3–3	Test Match	
5	13 December 2014	St. Bede's College, Christchurch, New Zealand	Canada	1–0	3–1	Test Match	
6	10 May 2015	Tasmanian Hockey Centre, Hobart, Australia	South Korea	1–3	1–3	Test Match	
7	6 March 2016	Tauranga Hockey Association, Tauranga, New Zealand	Malaysia	1–1	4–1	Test Match	
8	26 November 2016	State Netball and Hockey Centre, Melbourne, Australia	India	2–1	3–2	2016 I.F.O.H.	
