= 2022 Men's FIH Hockey5s =

Hockey5s men's tournament

Tournament details
- City: Lausanne, Switzerland
- Dates: 4–6 June
- Teams: 5 (from 4 confederations)
- Venue: Place de la Navigation

Final positions
- Champions: India (1st title)
- Runner-up: Poland
- Third place: Pakistan

Tournament statistics
- Matches played: 11
- Goals scored: 85 (7.73 per match)
- Top scorer: (India) Mohammed Raheel (10 goals)
- Best player: (India) Mohammed Raheel
- Best goalkeeper: (Switzerland) Lars Kleikemper

The 2022 Men's FIH Hockey5s was a men's field hockey series, staged in the Hockey5s format. The tournament was held at the Place de la Navigation in Lausanne, from 4–5 June.

The competition marked the first time the International Hockey Federation hosted a senior international tournament in the Hockey5s format. The tournament was held simultaneously with a women's event.

India won the tournament, defeating Poland 6–4 in the final.

== Results ==
=== Preliminary round ===
Pos	Team	Pld	W	D	L	GF	GA	GD	Pts	Qualification
1	India	4	3	1	0	19	10	+9	10	Final
2	Poland	4	2	0	2	12	12	0	6	Final
3	Pakistan	4	1	2	1	16	16	0	5	
4	Switzerland	4	1	1	2	16	16	0	4	
5	Malaysia	4	0	2	2	12	21	−9	2	

Source: FIH
Rules for classification: 1) points; 2) goal difference; 3) games won; 4) head-to-head result.

==== Fixtures ====
4 June 2022
12:30

Malaysia	4–4	Switzerland
Rosdi 7'; Anuar 10'; Liau 13'; Mamat 15'	Report	Andereggen 11', 20'; Landtwing 16'; Greder 16'

4 June 2022
14:00

Pakistan	4–2	Poland
Murtaza 4'; Abuzar 7', 13', 15'	Report	Rutkowski 6'; Pawlak 19'

4 June 2022
15:00

India	4–3	Switzerland
Mohammed 2', 10'; Rabichandra 5'; Gurinder 19'	Report	Winkler 6'; Reinhard 11'; Kruesi 16'

4 June 2022
16:00

Malaysia	0–5	Poland
	Report	Kurowski 2', 15'; Rutkowski 6'; Pawlak 8'; Koperski 20'

4 June 2022
17:00

Pakistan	2–2	India
Liaqat 7'; Rehman 20'	Report	Mohammed 1'; Gursahibjit 18'

4 June 2022
18:00

Poland	3–2	Switzerland
Pawlak 3'; Jarzyński 9'; Kurowski 20'	Report	Winkler 13', 14'

5 June 2022
13:00

Malaysia	3–7	India
Rosdi 4', 13'; Noor 9'	Report	Gursahibjit 1', 17'; Mohammed 8', 14', 18'; Sanjay 10', 12'

5 June 2022
14:00

Switzerland	7–5	Pakistan
Liaqat 4', 13', 16'; Murtaza 9'; Ul Hassan 14'	Report	Winkler 5', 15'; Brönnimann 8', 18'; Greder 12', 14'; Andereggen 13'

5 June 2022
15:00

India	6–2	Poland
Sanjay 2'; Mohammed 4', 9'; Gursahibjit 7'; Mandeep 10'; Rabichandra 15'	Report	Jarzyński 13'; Kurowski 16'

5 June 2022
16:00

Pakistan	5–5	Malaysia
Aqeel 6'; Rehman 7'; Liaqat 17', 20'; Ul Hassan 17'	Report	Rosdi 10', 13'; Anuar 16', 19'; Noor 20'

=== Final ===
5 June 2022
18:30

India	6–4	Poland
Sanjay 8'; Gurinder 9'; Dhami Boby 11', 19'; Mohammed 13', 17'	Report	Nowakowski 1'; Pawlak 5'; Rutkowski 5'; Kurowski 18'

== Awards ==
Top Goalscorer	Player of the Tournament	Goalkeeper of the Tournament
(India) Mohammed Raheel	(India) Mohammed Raheel	(Switzerland) Lars Kleikemper

== Goalscorers ==
There have been 85 goals scored in 11 matches, for an average of 7.73 goals per match.

10 goals

- (India) Mohammed Raheel

6 goals

- (Pakistan) Arshad Liaqat

5 goals

- (Malaysia) Firadus Rosdi
- (Poland) Jacek Kurowski
- (Switzerland) Jonas Winkler

4 goals

- (India) Sanjay
- (India) Gursahibjit Singh
- (Poland) Robert Pawlak

3 goals

- (Malaysia) Akhimullah Anuar
- (Pakistan) Abuzar
- (Poland) Wojciech Rutkowski
- (Switzerland) Silvan Andereggen
- (Switzerland) Martin Greder

2 goals

- (India) Rabichandra Singh Moirangthem
- (India) Dhami Boby Singh
- (India) Gurinder Singh
- (Malaysia) Nabil Noor
- (Pakistan) Muhammad Murtaza
- (Pakistan) Abdul Rehman
- (Pakistan) Tazeem Ul Hassan
- (Poland) Gracjan Jarzyński
- (Switzerland) Elias Brönnimann

1 goal

- (India) Mandeep Mor
- (Malaysia) Alfarico Liau
- (Malaysia) Muhammad Mamat
- (Pakistan) Ahmed Aqeel
- (Poland) Maksymilian Koperski
- (Poland) Mateusz Nowakowski
- (Switzerland) Patrick Kruesi
- (Switzerland) Fabio Landtwing
- (Switzerland) Fabio Reinhard

Source: FIH

== See also ==
- 2022 Women's FIH Hockey5s
