= Gursahibjit Singh =

Indian field hockey player

Personal information
- Born: 5 February 1999 (age 27) Bahadurpur Rajoa, Gurdaspur, Punjab, India

Sport
- Sport: Field hockey
- Position: Forward
National team
| Years | Team | Caps | Goals |
| 2018-2019 | India U21 | 12 | (5) |
| 2019-present | India | 28 | (8) |
| 2022-present | India Hockey5s | 5 | (4) |
Medal record
Men's field hockey
Representing India
Asian Champions Trophy
| Bronze medal – third place | 2021 Dhaka |
FIH Hockey5s
| Gold medal – first place | 2022 Lausanne |
Sultan of Johor Cup
| Silver medal – second place | 2018 Johor Bahru |
| Silver medal – second place | 2019 Johor Bahru |

Gursahibjit Singh (born 5 February 1999) is an Indian field hockey player who plays as a forward for the national team. Six months after representing India Under-21 at the 2018 Sultan of Johor Cup, he made his senior team debut at the 2019 Sultan Azlan Shah Cup.
