= Gurinder Singh (field hockey) =

Indian field hockey player

Personal information
- Born: 1 January 1995 (age 31) Ropar, Punjab, India

Sport
- Sport: Field hockey
- Position: Defender
- Club: Indian Oil Corporation
Senior career
Years	Team	Caps	Goals
–	Indian Oil Corporation	-	-
National team
Years	Team	Caps	Goals
2014–2016	India U21	9	(0)
2017–	India	69	(1)
2022–	India Hockey5s	5	(2)
Medal record
Men's field hockey
Representing India
Asian Champions Trophy
Gold medal – first place	2018 Muscat
Bronze medal – third place	2021 Dhaka
FIH Hockey5s
Gold medal – first place	2022 Lausanne
Junior World Cup
Gold medal – first place	2016 Lucknow

Gurinder Singh (born 1 January 1995) is an Indian field hockey player who plays as a defender. He was part of the Indian squad that won the 2016 Men's Hockey Junior World Cup. He made his senior team debut at the 2017 Sultan Azlan Shah Cup.
