= Shamsher Singh (field hockey) =

Indian field hockey player (born 1997)

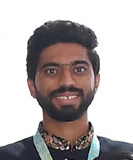
- Singh in August 2022

Personal information
- Born: 29 July 1997 (age 29) Attari, Amritsar district, Punjab, India
- Height: 1.78 m (5 ft 10 in)

Sport
- Sport: Field hockey
- Position: Forward
Senior career
| Years | Team | Caps | Goals |
| – | Hockey Punjab | - | - |
| – | Punjab National Bank | - | - |
| – | Punjab Armed Police | - | - |
| 2024– | Delhi SG Pipers | - | - |
National team
| Years | Team | Caps | Goals |
| 2016 | India U21 | 5 | (0) |
| 2019– | India | 111 | (16) |
Medal record
Men's field hockey
Representing India
Olympic Games
| Bronze medal – third place | 2020 Tokyo | Team |
| Bronze medal – third place | 2024 Paris | Team |
Asian Games
| Gold medal – first place | 2022 Hangzhou | Team |
Asian Champions Trophy
| Gold medal – first place | 2023 Chennai |
| Bronze medal – third place | 2021 Dhaka |
Commonwealth Games
| Silver medal – second place | 2022 Birmingham | Team |

Shamsher Singh (born 29 July 1997) is an Indian field hockey player who plays as a forward. He made his international debut for the national senior team at the 2019 Men's Ready Steady Tokyo Hockey Tournament. Finally he won gold medal in 2022 Asian Games in Hangzhou.
