= Men's Hockey5s Asia Cup =

- Most recent season or competition: 2023 Men's Asian Hockey5s World Cup Qualifier
- Sport: Hockey5s
- Founded: 2023; 3 years ago
- First season: 2023
- No. of teams: 11
- Confederation: AHF (Asia)
- Most recent champion: India (2023)
- Most titles: India (1 Title)

The Men's Hockey5s Asia Cup (also known as Men's Asian Hockey5s World Cup Qualifier) is a men's international Hockey5's tournament organized by the Asian Hockey Federation. The event is played in Hockey 5s format, a 5-a-side game that is played on a smaller field size. The winning team becomes the champion of Asia and qualifies for the FIH Hockey5s World Cup.

The first edition took place in Salalah from 29 August–2 September 2023, along with other continental qualifiers, won by India after overcoming Pakistan in the shoot-out. The top 3 teams from the inaugural tournament qualified for the first ever Hockey5s World Cup.

== Results ==
#	Year	Host	Final			Third place match			Teams
#	Year	Host	Winner	Score	Runner-up	Third place	Score	Fourth place	Teams
1	2023; Details	Salalah, Oman	India	4–4 (2–0 p.s.o.)	Pakistan	Oman	5–4	Malaysia	11

== Successful national teams ==
Teams reaching the top four
Team	Champions	Runners-up	Third place	Fourth place
India	1 (2023)			
Pakistan		1 (2023)		
Oman			1 (2023*)	
Malaysia				1 (2023)

* = host country

=== Team appearances ===
Team	(Oman) 2023	Total
Afghanistan	11th	1
Bangladesh	5th	1
Hong Kong	10th	1
India	1st	1
Indonesia	9th	1
Iran	6th	1
Japan	8th	1
Kazakhstan	7th	1
Malaysia	4th	1
Oman	3rd	1
Pakistan	2nd	1
Total (11)	11	

=== Debut of teams ===
Year	Debutants	Total
2023	Afghanistan, Bangladesh, Hong Kong, India, Indonesia, Iran, Japan, Kazakhstan, Malaysia, Oman, Pakistan	11
Total		11

== See also ==
- Women's Hockey5s Asia Cup
- Men's U18 Hockey5's Asia Cup
