= Stuart Rushmere =

English field hockey player

Personal information
- Born: 9 September 2000 (age 25)

Sport
- Sport: Field hockey
- Position: Midfielder
Senior career
| Years | Team | Caps | Goals |
| 2017–2019 | Team Bath Buccaneers | - | - |
| 2020–2022 | Loughborough Students | - | - |
| 2022–2026 | Surbiton | - | - |
National team
| Years | Team | Caps | Goals |
| 2018–2019 | England & GB U21 | 17 | (0) |
| 2022-present | England & GB | 2 | (0) |
Medal record
Men's field hockey
Representing England
EuroHockey Championship
| Silver medal – second place | 2023 Mönchengladbach |
Commonwealth Games
| Bronze medal – third place | 2022 Birmingham | Team |
EuroHockey Junior Championship
| Silver medal – second place | 2019 Valencia |

Stuart Rushmere (born 9 September 2000) is an English field hockey player who plays as a midfielder for Surbiton Hockey Club and the England and Great Britain national teams.

== Biography ==
Rushmere attended Millfield School and began his hockey career with Team Bath Buccaneers.

Rushmere played in the Men's England Hockey League Division 1 North for Loughborough Students and made his senior England debut against Spain on 4 February 2022. Shortly afterwards on 1 June 2022, Rushmere signed for Surbiton Hockey Club. He won a bronze medal with England in the Men's tournament at the 2022 Commonwealth Games in Birmingham.

Rushmere was part of the Surbiton team that won the league title during the 2024–25 Men's England Hockey League season.
