= Malaysia men's national hockey5s team =

Malaysia
- Confederation: AHF (Asia)

FIH ranking
- Current: 2 (March 2024)

The Malaysia men's national hockey5s team represents Malaysia in hockey 5s and is sanctioned by the Malaysian Hockey Confederation.

== History ==
Malaysia received an invite to participate at the 2022 Men's FIH Hockey5s owing to its youth hockey5s gold medal result at the field hockey event of the 2018 Summer Youth Olympics. The 2022 FIH Hockey5s in Lausanne, Switzerland is the first ever senior's hockey5s tournament by the International Hockey Federation (FIH). The Malaysian Hockey Confederation named Megat Azrafiq Termizi as coach.

Malaysia finished as runners-up at the 2024 Men's FIH Hockey5s World Cup in Oman–losing to the Netherlands in the final.

They won gold medal at the 2025 SEA Games in Thailand.

== Tournament record ==
=== World Cup ===
FIH World Cup record
Year	Round	Position	Pld	W	D*	L	GF	GA
(Oman) 2024	Final	2nd	5	4	1	1	28	22
Total	1/1	0 title	5	4	1	1	28	22

=== SEA Games ===
SEA Games record
Year	Round	Position	Pld	W	D*	L	GF	GA
(Thailand) 2025	Final	1st	5	5	0	0	48	7
Total	1/1	1 title	5	5	0	0	48	7
