= India men's national hockey5s team =

Hockey5s team that represents India

India hockey5s men
- Association: Hockey India
- Confederation: AHF (Asia)
- Head Coach: (India) Sardar Singh
- Captain: Simranjeet Singh
- Top scorer: Mohammed Raheel (43)

FIH ranking
- Current: 2 (March 2024)

First international
- India 4–3 Switzerland (Lausanne, 4 June 2022)

Last international
- India 6–4 Egypt (Muscat, 31 January 2024)

Biggest win
- India 35–1 Japan (Salalah, 31 August 2023)

Hockey5s World Cup
- Appearances: 1 (first in 2024)
- Best result: 5th (2024)

Hockey5s Asia Cup
- Appearances: 1 (first in 2023)
- Best result: (gold) 1st (2023)
Medal record
Hockey5s Asia Cup
| Gold medal – first place | 2023 Salalah |

The India men's national hockey5s team represents India in international senior hockey5s tournaments and is governed by the Hockey India. They are the reigning Asian champions and are ranked number 2 in the world.

== History ==
The team made its first participation in the inaugural 2022 FIH Hockey5s in Lausanne. India clinched the first title by defeating Poland in the final, with an undefeated record in the tournament. India defeated arch-rivals Pakistan in the final of the first Hockey5s Asia Cup, which also served as the Asian qualifier for the first FIH Hockey5s World Cup in 2024. India finished 5th in the 2024 World Cup after the quarter-final loss to the Netherlands, who were the eventual champions.

== Tournament record ==
=== FIH Hockey5s World Cup ===
FIH Hockey5s World Cup record
| Year | Round | Position | Pld | W | D* | L | GF | GA |
|---|---|---|---|---|---|---|---|---|
| (Oman) 2024 | Quarter-finals | 5th | 6 | 4 | 0 | 2 | 47 | 24 |
| Total | 1/1 | 5th | 6 | 4 | 0 | 2 | 47 | 24 |

=== Hockey5s Asia Cup ===
Hockey5s Asia Cup record
| Year | Round | Position | Pld | W | D* | L | GF | GA |
|---|---|---|---|---|---|---|---|---|
| (Oman) 2023 | Final | 1st | 7 | 5 | 1 | 1 | 87 | 22 |
| Total | 1/1 | 1 title | 7 | 5 | 1 | 1 | 87 | 22 |

=== FIH Hockey5s ===
FIH Hockey5s record
| Year | Round | Position | Pld | W | D* | L | GF | GA |
|---|---|---|---|---|---|---|---|---|
| (Switzerland) 2022 | Final | 1st | 5 | 4 | 1 | 0 | 25 | 14 |
| Total | 1/1 | 1 title | 5 | 4 | 1 | 0 | 25 | 14 |

== Honours ==
=== Major tournaments ===
- Hockey5s Asia Cup:
  - (gold) Champions: 2023
- FIH Hockey5s:
  - (gold) Champions: 2022

== Current squad ==
The following Indian team named for the 2024 FIH Hockey5s World Cup, held at Muscat, from 28 to 31 January 2024

Head coach: (India) Sardar Singh

Players, caps and goals updated as of 31 January 2024.

| No. | Pos. | Player | Date of birth (age) | Caps | Goals | Club |
|---|---|---|---|---|---|---|
| 2 | GK | Prashant Kumar Chauhan | 1 December 2000 (age 25) | 6 | | |
| 77 | GK | Suraj Karkera | 14 October 1995 (age 31) | 12 | | |
| 44 | DF | Mandeep Mor | 16 March 1999 (age 27) | 18 | 13 | |
| 49 | DF | Manjeet | 10 October 2001 (age 25) | 6 | 4 | |
| 13 | MF | Maninder Singh | 4 February 2001 (age 25) | 13 | 32 | |
| 9 | MF | Mohammed Raheel Mouseen | 20 December 1996 (age 29) | 18 | 43 | |
| 7 | FW | Gurjot Singh | 22 November 2004 (age 21) | 13 | 16 | |
| 52 | FW | Pawan Rajbhar | 2 July 1997 (age 29) | 13 | 17 | |
| 10 | FW | Simranjeet Singh (Captain) | 27 December 1996 (age 29) | 6 | | |
| 16 | FW | Uttam Singh | 10 December 2002 (age 23) | 6 | 6 | |

== Individual records ==
=== Top goal scorers ===
| Position | Player | Goals | Caps |
|---|---|---|---|
| 1 | Mohammed Raheel Mouseen | 43 | 18 |
| 2 | Maninder Singh | 32 | 13 |
| 3 | Pawan Rajbhar | 17 | 13 |
| 4 | Gurjot Singh | 16 | 13 |
| 5 | Mandeep Mor | 13 | 18 |

=== Most goals for India in Hockey5s World Cup ===
| Position | Player | Goals |
|---|---|---|
| 1 | Mohammed Raheel | 12 |
| 2 | Maninder Singh | 10 |
| 3 | Mandeep Mor | 7 |
| 4 | Pawan Rajbhar | 6 |
| 4 | Uttam Singh | 6 |

== Head-to-head record ==
| Won more matches than lost |
| All matches drawn |
| Won equal matches to lost |
| Lost more matches than won |

=== Overall record ===
Record last updated as of the following match:

India vs Egypt at Hockey Oman, Muscat in the 2024 Hockey5s World Cup, 31 January 2024

| Opponent | GP | W | D | L | GF | GA | Win % | Last meeting |
|---|---|---|---|---|---|---|---|---|
| Bangladesh | 1 | 1 | 0 | 0 | 15 | 1 | 100% | 2023 |
| Egypt | 2 | 1 | 0 | 1 | 12 | 12 | 50% | 2024 |
| Jamaica | 1 | 1 | 0 | 0 | 13 | 0 | 100% | 2024 |
| Japan | 1 | 1 | 0 | 0 | 35 | 1 | 100% | 2023 |
| Kenya | 1 | 1 | 0 | 0 | 9 | 4 | 100% | 2024 |
| Malaysia | 3 | 3 | 0 | 0 | 24 | 12 | 100% | 2023 |
| Netherlands | 1 | 0 | 0 | 1 | 4 | 7 | 0% | 2024 |
| Oman | 1 | 1 | 0 | 0 | 12 | 2 | 100% | 2023 |
| Pakistan | 3 | 0 | 2 | 1 | 10 | 11 | 0% | 2023 |
| Poland | 2 | 2 | 0 | 0 | 12 | 6 | 100% | 2022 |
| Switzerland | 2 | 2 | 0 | 0 | 13 | 4 | 100% | 2024 |
| Total | 18 | 13 | 2 | 3 | 159 | 60 | 72.22% | 2024 |

=== India Pakistan rivalry ===
India have played three matches against Pakistan, drawing two and losing one.

The following table shows India vs Pakistan in major tournaments :

| Tournament | Year | Venue | Winning team, result |
|---|---|---|---|
| FIH Hockey5s | 2022 | (Switzerland) Lausanne | Draw, 2–2 |
| Hockey5s Asia Cup | 2023 | (Oman) Salalah | Pakistan, 5–4 |
| Hockey5s Asia Cup | 2023 | (Oman) Salalah | Draw 4–4, India won (p.s.o) 2–0 |

== See also ==
Indian national hockey teams
| Men's | | | | | Women's | | | | |
|---|---|---|---|---|---|---|---|---|---|
| Senior | Under-21 | Under-18 | Senior Hockey5s | Under-18 hockey5s | Senior | Under-21 | Under-18 | Senior Hockey5s | Under-18 hockey5s |

- Field hockey in India
- India national para hockey team
