= FIH Men's Hockey5s World Cup =

5s world cup tournament

- Sport: Hockey5s
- Founded: 2019
- First season: 2024
- No. of teams: 16
- Continent: International (FIH)
- Most recent champion: Netherlands (1st title) (2024)
- Most titles: Netherlands (1 title)
- Website: Hockey5s World Cup

The FIH Men's Hockey5s World Cup is an international field hockey competition organised by the International Hockey Federation (FIH). The first tournament was held in 2024.

== History ==
The executive board of the International Hockey Federation (FIH) decided to organize the FIH Hockey5s World Cup in 2019. In June 2021, the FIH awarded Oman to be the host the inaugural edition of the tournament in 2024.

== Results ==
Year	Host	Final			Third place match			Number of teams
Year	Host	Winner	Score	Runner-up	Third place	Score	Fourth place	Number of teams
2024; Details	Muscat, Oman	Netherlands	5–2	Malaysia	Oman	3–2	Poland	16

== Team appearances ==
Team	(Oman) 2024	Total
Australia	11th	1
Egypt	6th	1
Fiji	15th	1
India	5th	1
Jamaica	16th	1
Kenya	7th	1
Malaysia	2nd	1
Netherlands	1st	1
New Zealand	12th	1
Nigeria	14th	1
Oman	3rd	1
Pakistan	9th	1
Poland	4th	1
Switzerland	10th	1
Trinidad and Tobago	8th	1
United States	13th	1
Total	16	

== See also ==
- FIH Women's Hockey5s World Cup
- Men's FIH Youth Hockey5s World Cup
