= Indergarh, Moga =

Village in Punjab, India

Coordinates: 30°55′44″N 75°18′32″E

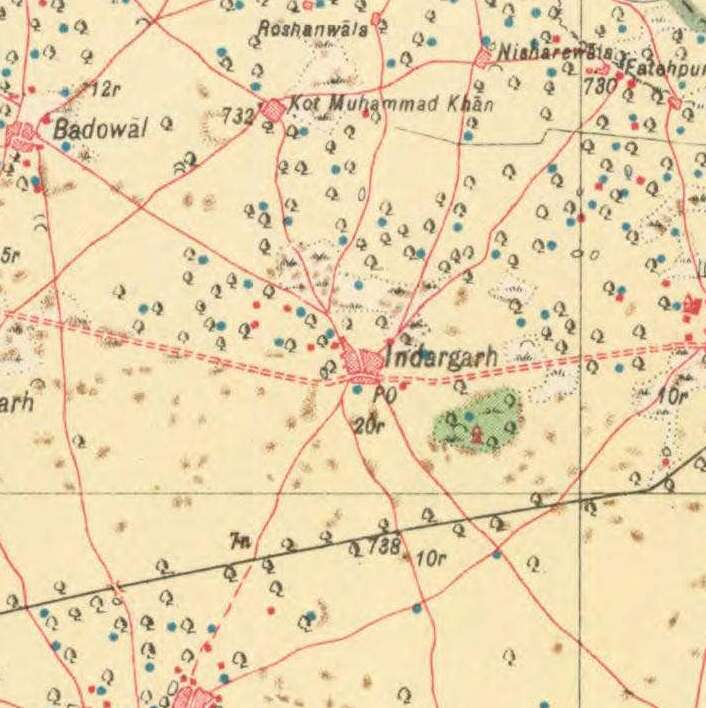
Indergarh village, Survey of India geographical block-map for 44 N NW Ferozepore (1921)

Indergarh is a village located in the Kot Ise Khan tehsil of Moga district, Punjab, India. As per the 2011 census, it had a population of 3,945.
