= Khosa Pando =

Coordinates: 30°51′56″N 75°06′54″E

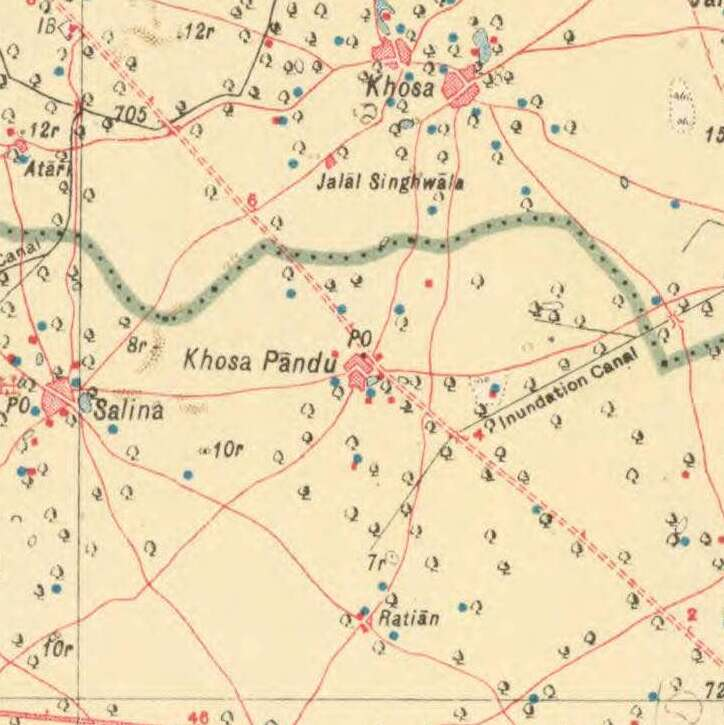
Khosa Pando village in Moga tehsil, Survey of India geographical block-map for 44 N NW Ferozepore (1921)

Khosa Pando is a village located in Moga district of Punjab, India. Its population was recorded as 4,754 in the 2011 census.

== History ==
During World War I, at-least thirty-two local men from Khosa Pando served in the British Indian Army, with at-least two of them dying during the war.
