= Matwani =

Coordinates: 30°48′N 75°19′E

Matwani is a village in Moga district, Punjab, North-West India. It is important in the history of Sikhism, as there is a Gurudwara Sahib in the village associated with the sixth Sikh Guru, Shri Guru Har Gobind Ji.

The village is mainly populated by members of the Korotana sran subgroup of Jatts.
