= Chotian Kalan =

Village in Punjab, India

Chotian Kalan is a small village of Moga district, in Punjab, India. Its population is about 1,500. There is one primary school, five peer jagah, and two Gurudwara Sahib. In this village, people are from Gen SC category.
