= Charik =

- village
- Location in Punjab, India Charik (India)
- Coordinates: 30.720634°N 75.175623°E
- Country: India
- State: Punjab
- District: Moga

Government
  - Body: Panchayat

Population (2011)
  - Total: 10,228

Languages
  - Official: Punjabi
- Time zone: UTC+5:30 (IST)
- PIN: 142001
- Vehicle registration: PB29
- Nearest city: Moga about 10 km
- Lok Sabha constituency: Faridkot
- Civic agency: Panchayat
- Telephone/STD code: 01636

Charik is a village in Moga district of Punjab, India.

== Geography ==
Charik is at 30°43′12″N 75°10′19″E. It is 10 km south of the district headquarters Moga.

== History ==
The area known as the Charik(also spelled Chiruk or Chhirak in historic documents) Ilaka originally consisted of a single village.

Chhirak, settled by a man named Jhanda, a subject of the Rai of Raikot. During the decline of the Empire, Jhanda’s descendants sought protection from the Chief of Kalsia State and agreed to pay him half the revenue from their lands. Over time, this arrangement expanded to include eight villages.

In 1855, these villages were restored to Kalsia State after the British authorities found that their earlier assumption — that the land was jointly owned by Kalsia and a British subject, Sardar Dewa Singh — was incorrect.

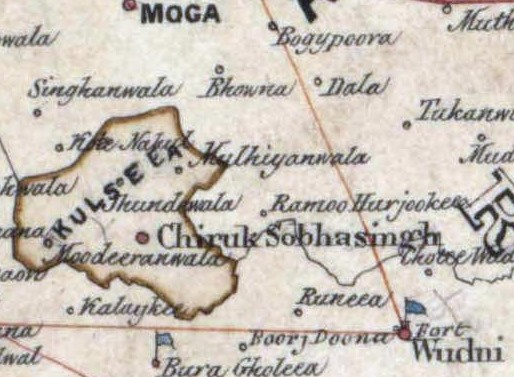
Map showing Kalsia state's Charik exclave (ca. 1847–51).

Up until 1947–48, this area remained part of Kalsia as an exclave, surrounded by Moga tehsil of Ferozpur district, effectively making it a Kalsia enclave within British Punjab.

After Kalsia acceded to the Dominion of India in 1948, this territory became part of the Bathinda district of the Patiala and East Punjab States Union (PEPSU) — still as an exclave, now of Bathinda district rather than Kalsia State.

Later, under the Absorption of Enclaves Order, 1950, around 21.27 square miles, including seven villages of the Charik circle, were transferred from PEPSU to Ferozpur district (Moga tehsil) to remove the enclave.
