= Bhekha =

- Village
- Location in Punjab, India Bhekha (India)
- Coordinates: 30.767659°N 75.021139°E
- Country: India
- State: Punjab
- District: Moga

Languages
  - Official: Punjabi
- Time zone: UTC+5:30 (IST)

Bhekha is a small village 21 km from Moga district of Indian (Punjab) towards south west near Daroli Bhai.

It has a middle school and two play schools. Many students also study in different schools. It has three Gurudwaras. Bhekha is predominantly a Sidhu Brar village with few chahals, one Gill, two Dhaliwals or others.
