= Badhni Kalan =

- Town
- Location in Punjab, India Badhni Kalan (India)
- Coordinates: 30.6833°N 75.2833°E
- Country: India
- State: Punjab
- District: Moga

Population (2013)
  - Total: 6,373

Languages
  - Official: Punjabi
- Time zone: UTC+5:30 (IST)
- PIN: 142037
- Telephone code: 01636-
- Vehicle registration: PB-66

Badhni Kalan is a town and a nagar nigham in Moga district in the state of Punjab, India. Kalan is Persian language word which means Big.

== Location ==
Badhni kalan is located on moga to Barnala road.

== Demographics ==
As of 2001 India census, Badhni Kalan had a population of 6373. Males constitute 52% of the population and females 48%. Badhni Kalan has an average literacy rate of 58%, lower than the national average of 59.5%; with 53% of the males and 47% of females literate. 11% of the population is under 6 years of age.

The table below shows the population of different religious groups in Badhni Kalan town, as of 2011 census.

Population by religious groups in Badhni Kalan town, 2011 census
Religion	Total	Female	Male
Sikh	4,390	2,083	2,307
Hindu	2,217	1,023	1,194
Muslim	109	52	57
Jain	44	22	22
Christian	4	2	2
Buddhist	3	0	3
Not stated	19	8	11
Total	6,786	3,190	3,596

== Notable people ==
Badhni Kalan is Nanka Pind of Baba Nand Singh Jee Nanaksar Wale.
