= Himmatpura =

Himmatpura, formerly known as Jusampurais, is a village in the Moga district of Punjab, India.

== Origin of the name ==
Guru Hargobind changed the name of the village from yusufpura to Himmatpura following a visit to the area in which his saddle was stolen and later returned.

== Population and government ==
Himmatpura has a total population of about 23,000 people. Nearly 2,680 are scheduled castes. About 3,200 people are literate in this village. There is about 1,135 families living here, according to government figures. The Patwar office for this village is here, and Kanugo Area is Takhtpura near by village. The nearest Krishi Vigyan Kendra (KVK) to this village is Budh Singh Wala Moga Block-I).

== Places of worship ==
Prakash Divas of Guru Nanak Dev and Guru Arjan Dev are the major events, to which all people are welcome.

- Gurudwara Patsahi Sehvi: This Gurudwara is a holy place for Sikhs, but everyone is welcome. Every month on the day of Massea there is a special programme. Every year on the birthday of Guru Nanak Dev ji, Parbhat Feri is held. There are six rooms with limited facilities in the Gurudwara premises for pilgrims to stay.
- Namdhari Dera: This place belongs to Namdharis. Namdhari (also known as Kukas) are a sect of Sikhism. The main difference between Namdhari Sikhs and mainstream Sikhs is their belief in Jagjit Singh as their living guru (as opposed to the Sri Guru Granth Sahib, the present Guru of Sikhs). On the first day of every month (according to Desi Mahine) Sangrandh is held here, and every year there is Akhand Path Sahib Bhog in the month of Bhado.
- Mallo Saheed: this place is about 2 km from the village. There is a special programme on every Dashwi (according to desi months).
- Dhadeaana Sahib: this place is famous for the Vaisakhi Festival, an annual fair. Most have a high regard for this place. There is a Shiv Mandir here.
- Kuttia: This place belongs to Sant Shri Shankranand Ji. Every year there is a programme on Basant here.
- Mandir: There is one mandir (temple), as well, where people hold programmes from time to time. It is located opposite the AB Mechanical Workshop (binder di workshop).
- Masjid: There is one masjid (mosque) as well. Every year there is a programme held at the mosque; Qawwals attend and sing devotional music.
