= Chuhar Chak =

- Village
- Location in Punjab, India Chuhar Chak (India)
- Coordinates: 30°46′39″N 75°21′46″E
- Country: India
- State: Punjab
- District: Moga

Population (2001)
  - Total: 1,636

Languages
  - Official: Punjabi
- Time zone: UTC+5:30 (IST)
- PIN: 142053
- Nearest city: Moga
- Sex ratio: 1000/832 ♂/♀

Chuhar Chak is a town located in the Moga district of Punjab, India.

== Geography ==
This village is surrounded by Dhudike (1 km), Daudhar (5 km), Daangian (5 km), Kaonke Kalan (4 km), Nanaksar Kaleran (6 km), Galib Kalan (7 km), Killi Chahlan (4 km). Ajitwal is the nearest railway station at 4 km.

== Demographics ==
The village has total population of 1,636 with 277 households, 893 males and 743 females.

== Culture ==
Punjabi is the mother tongue as well as the official language of the village.

== Religion ==
The villagers are mainly Sikhs and follows the Sikh faith with Hindu minorities.

== Education ==
Senior Secondary School was established as Khalsa High School in 1904. There is an ITI for girls.

== Sarpanch (village head) ==
Charanjit Kaur Gill – she is sarpanch of as of 30 December 2018.

== Notable people ==
- Lachhman Singh Gill, former Chief Minister of Punjab
- Jagjit Gill, director of the movie Putt Jattan De

== See also ==
- Gill – a Jatt clan
