= Moga district =

Coordinates: 30°49′12″N 75°10′12″E

- District of Punjab
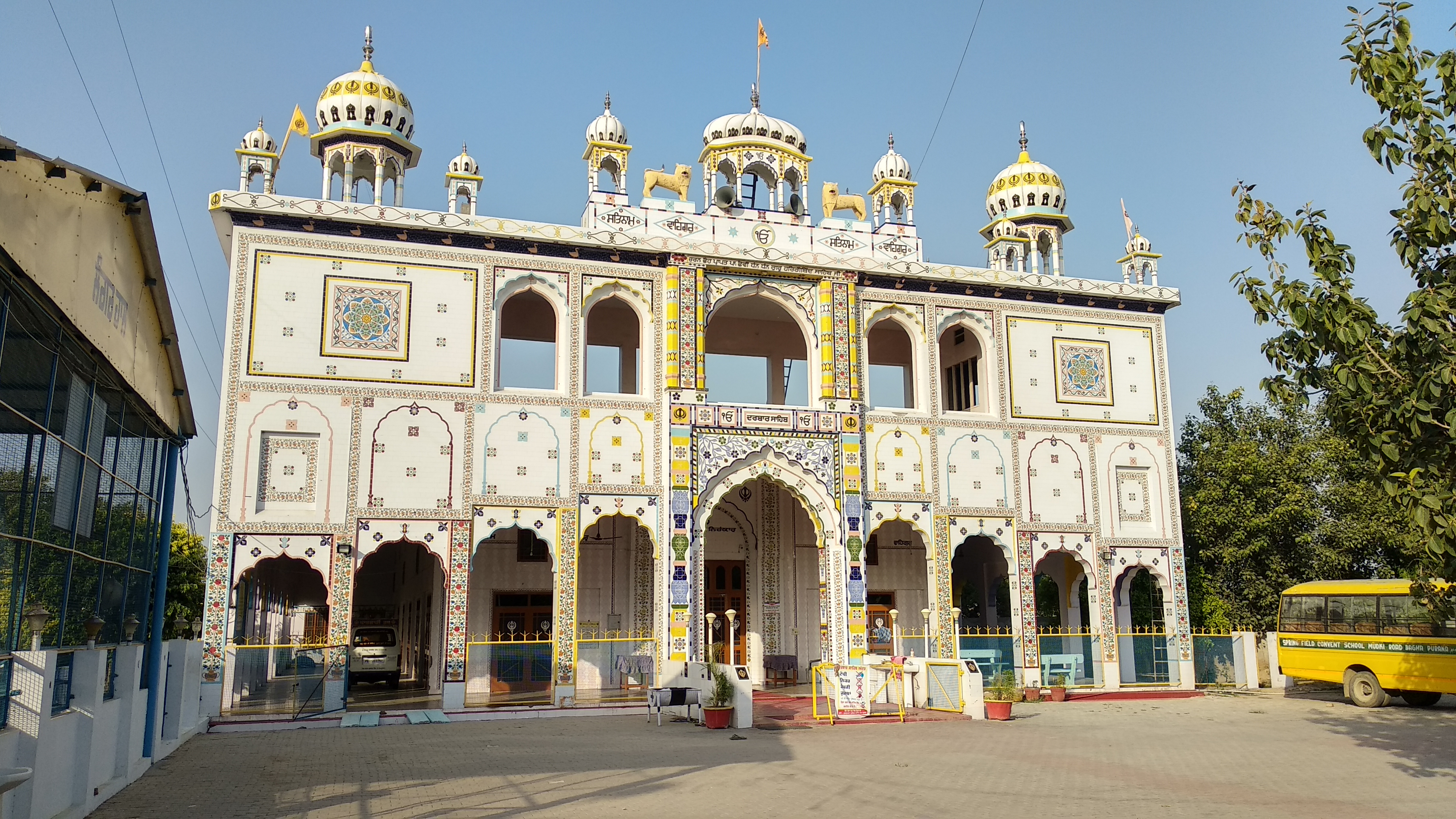
- Gurdwara in Bagha Purana
- Moga district
- Country: India
- State: Punjab
- Headquarters: Moga

Area
  - Total: 2,235 km^{2} (863 sq mi)

Population (2011)
  - Total: 995,746
  - Density: 444/km^{2} (1,150/sq mi)

Languages
  - Official: Punjabi
- Time zone: UTC+5:30 (IST)
- HDI (2017): ▲0.705 ( High)
- Website: moga.nic.in

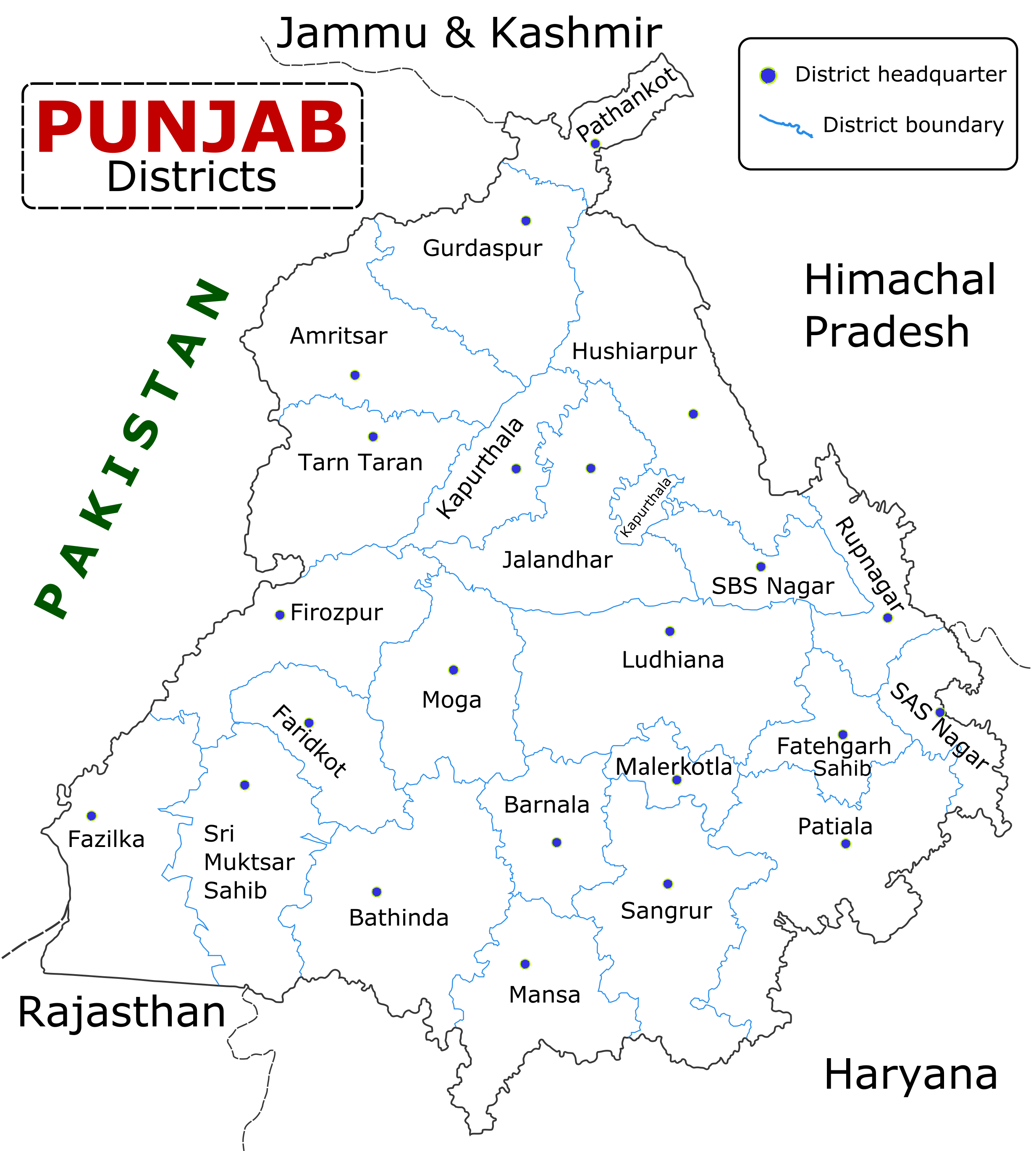
Districts of Punjab along with their headquarters

Moga district is one of the twenty-three districts in the state of Punjab, India. It became the 17th district of Punjab state on 24 November 1995, being cut from the Faridkot and Firozpur districts. Moga district is among the largest producers of wheat and rice in Punjab, India. People from Moga city and Moga district belong to the Malwa culture. The district is noted for being the homeland for a high-proportion of Indian Punjabi expatriates who emigrated abroad and their descendants, which has given it the nickname of "NRI district". Parts of the district are located in the Tihara sub-region of the larger Malwa region. The district is part of the Firozpur division.

Moga city, the headquarters of the district, is situated on Ferozpur-Moga-Ludhiana road. Moga is well-known for its Nestlé factory, Adani Food Pvt Ltd, and vehicle modifications. Highways connected with Moga are Jalandhar, Barnala, Ludhiana, Ferozpur, Kotkapura, Amritsar. Bus and railway services are well connected with major cities like Ludhiana, Chandigarh, and Delhi.

Moga district is notable for its higher standard of living compared to neighbouring Punjabi districts, based upon metrics such as access to education, electrification, and healthcare. Much of this is attributed to the economic development of the district in the agricultural sector, such as the dairy industry.

== Etymology ==
The name of Moga may be ultimately derived from the Indo-Scythian king, Maues, who invaded and ruled the area in the 1st century BCE after conquering the Indo-Greek polities of the region. "Moga" is the Indianized form of "Maues". Another theory states Moga was named after Moga of the Gill clan, who owned a jagir that was located on the present-day location of Moga city.

== History ==
=== Ancient era ===
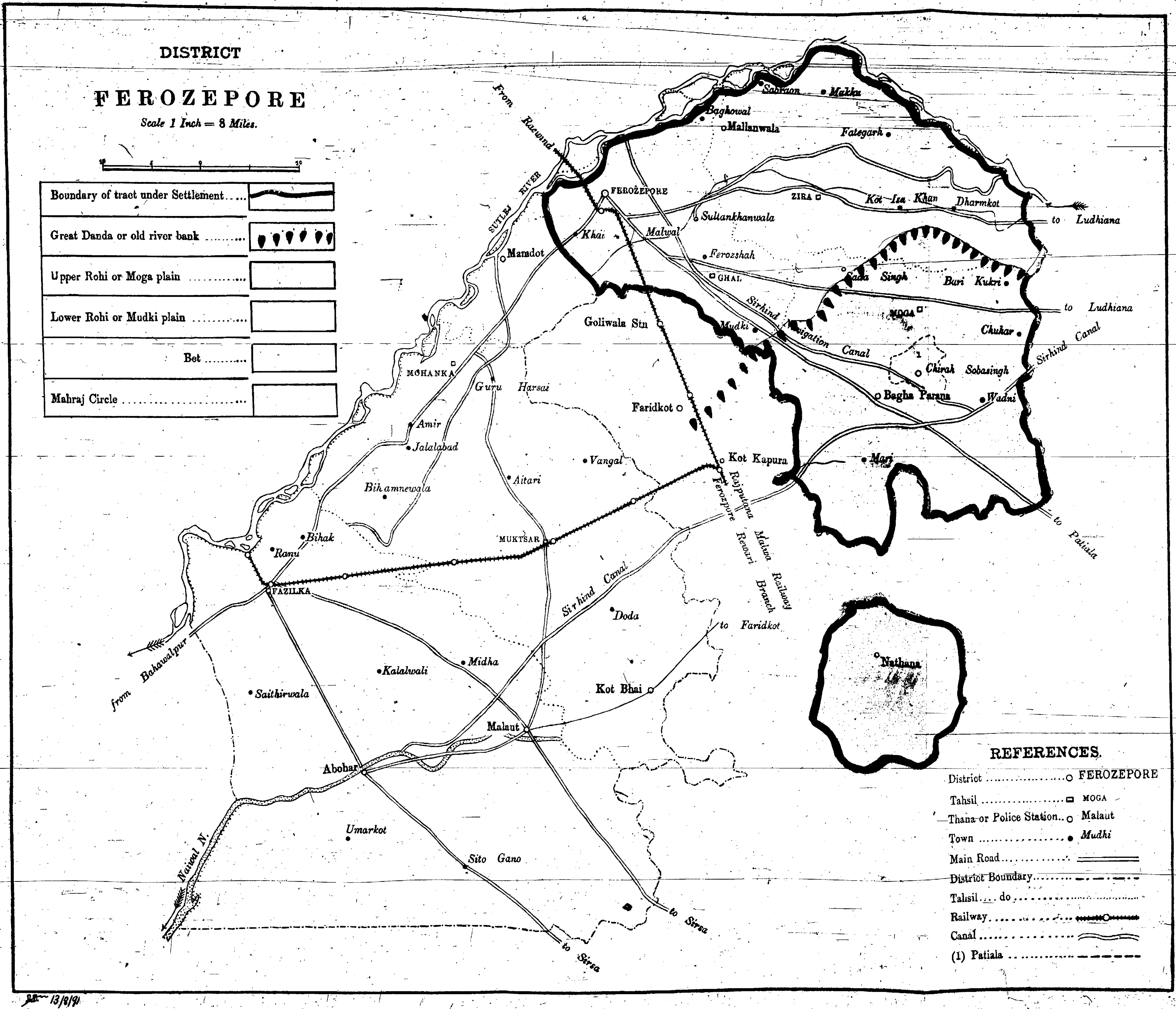
Map of Ferozepore district, with a focus on Zira and Moga tehsils, 13 July 1891. The old course of the Sutlej River is marked on the map.

Structures and sites dating before the reign of the Mughal emperor Akbar are exceedingly rare due to the changing course of the Sutlej river throughout the centuries. As a result, very few sites dating back to antiquity have been uncovered in the local area of Moga. This effect is more pronounced in the western parts of the district.

The location of ancient villages and towns can be inferred to the present of mounds of earth, brick, and pottery that have been excavated called thehs. These mounds are evidence that the banks of the river were inhabited in ancient times. A number of coins have been discovered at the site of these mounds.

==== Indus Valley Civilization ====
Sites identified as belonging to the Indus Valley Civilization have been discovered in the area. Scholars have linked these finds to other sites uncovered in the Rupnagar area of Punjab. The findings, such as pottery found in mounds, have been categorized as belonging to the pre-Harappan and late-Harappan periods of the IVC.

==== Vedic period ====
The composition of the Rigveda is proposed to have occurred in the Punjab circa 1500 and 1200 BCE.

==== Post-Vedic period (After 600 BCE) ====
The region of Moga belongs to the Malwai cultural zone, named after the ancient Malava tribe who inhabited the area in ancient times. During the reign of Porus in the 4th century BCE, the southern area of Punjab was ruled by both the Kshudrakas and Malavas. Some scholars believe they were pushed southwards due to martial and social pressures occurring in the north. Alexander of Macedon warred with the Malavas for control of the region. This wrestle for power is recorded as being fierce and bitter in Greek historical accounts. After the withdrawal of Macedonian forces in the area, the Malavas joined with anti-Greek forces to usurp Hellenistic power and control of the region, leading to the formation of the Mauryan dynasty.

The decline of the Mauryan dynasty coincided with an invasion of Bactrian Greeks, who successfully took control of the region in the second century BCE. This seizure of power in the Punjab by the Bactrians led to the migration of the Malavas from the area to Rajasthan, and from there to the now-called Malwa plateau of Central India.

=== Medieval era ===
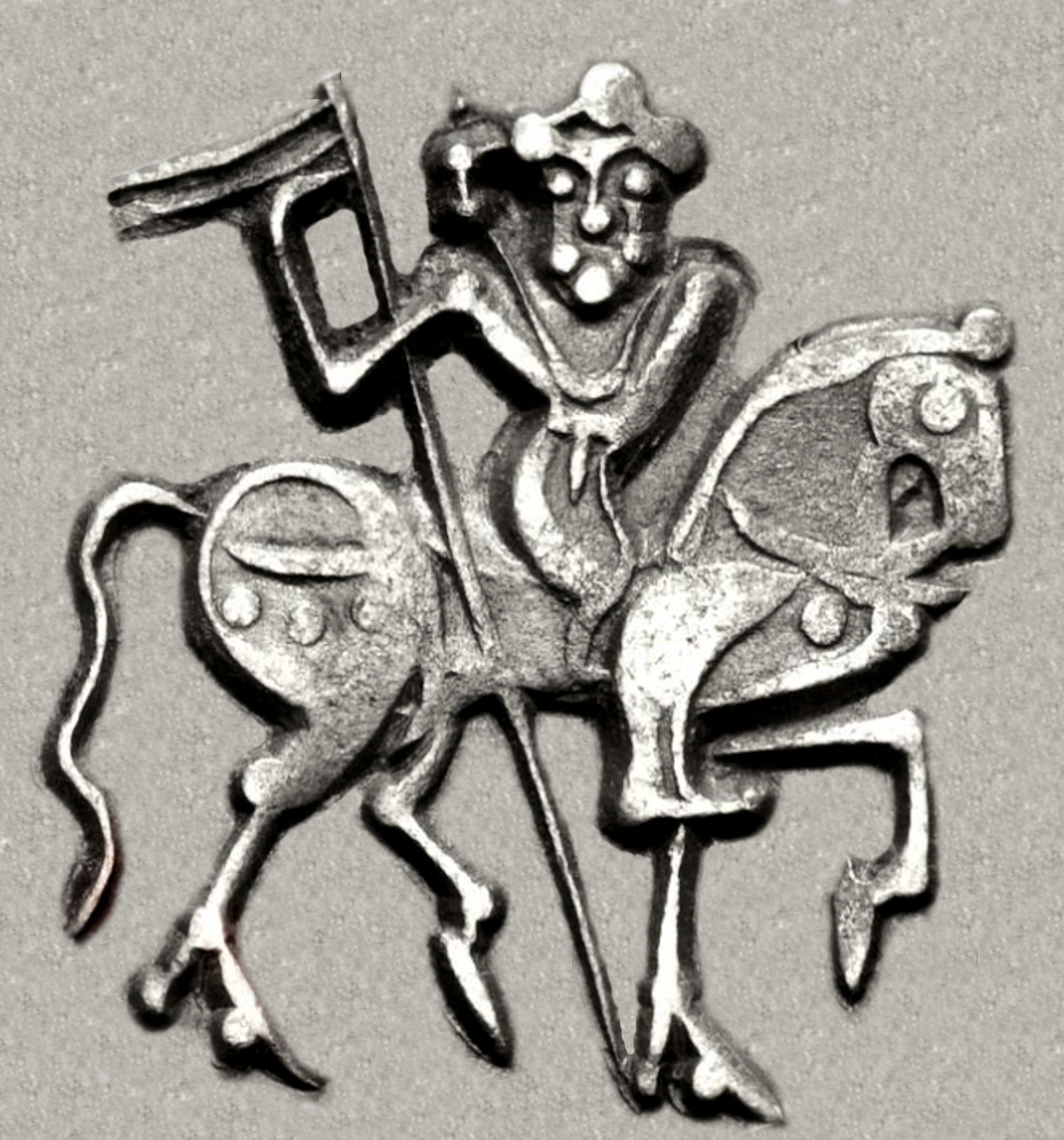
Horseman holding banner on Hindu Shahi coinage in the name of Spalapati, Kabul, circa 750–900

The region of Moga was under the control of the Hindushahi dynasty in the early-mediaeval period. However, the initial Muslim invasions of the northwestern Indian subcontinent in the 11th century led to the end of the Hindushahis, with the defeat of the native ruler Bhimapala, and the onset of Islamic-rule in the region.

The area is believed to have been under the writ of the Punwar clan of Rajputs during the early-mediaeval period. They were headquartered in Janer, at the old riverbed location of the Sutlej river, over six kilometres north of the present-day city of Moga. Later on, the Bhati clan of Rajputs, originating from Jaisalmer, established themselves in the area, superseding the previous Punwars for authority of the region.

Jat tribes, who had been practicing migratory, nomadic-pastoralism for much of their recorded history, began to permanently settle the Moga area during this time and take up a sedentary lifestyle of settled agriculture. First of them being the Dhaliwal clan, who firmly established themselves southeast of Moga at Kangar. They appear to have possibly obtained high repute, seeing as a woman of the clan, Dharm, who was the daughter of Chaudhary Mihr Mitha Dhaliwal, was wedded to the Mughal emperor Akbar. The Gill clan of Jats, originally based in Bathinda, dispersed to the western parts of Moga district around this time. At the end of the 16th century, the Sidhu clan of Jats migrated northwards to the area from Rajasthan. A branch of the Sidhus, the Brars, established themselves in the south of Gill territory, pushing its former inhabitants northwards whilst taking control of their key places in the process. The Brars founded a chieftainship at Kot Kapura, 40 kilometres west of present-day Moga, and rebelled against the overlordship of Nawab Ise Khan, the Manj governor.

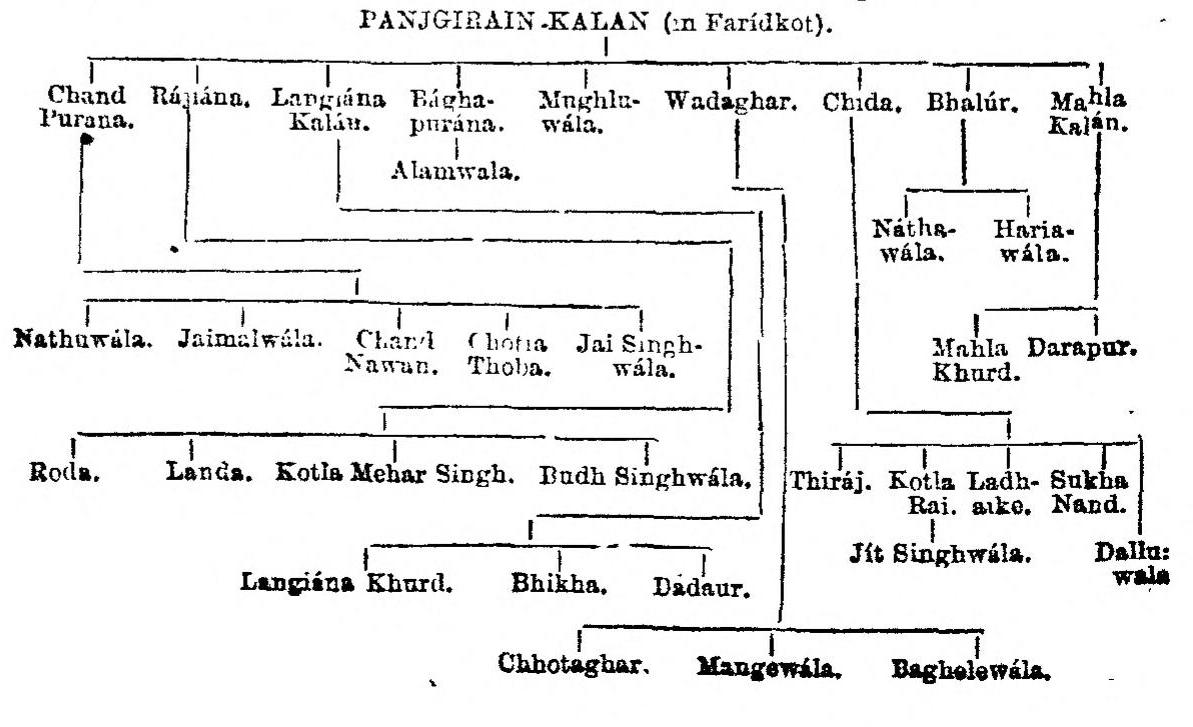
Village chart of Moga region showing the connection of the principal villages established by Brar Jats to each-other, Gazetteer of the Ferozepore District, 1888–89

Kot Ise Khan was established by a relative of Mokalsi, named Isa Khan. (Note: 'Mokalsi' is also known as 'Mokal'.) Mokalsi was the founder of a chieftainship in Faridkot. There were tensions between the Brar Jatts and Isa Khan, with the latter being killed by the Brars, allowing the Brars to become hegemonic in the region.

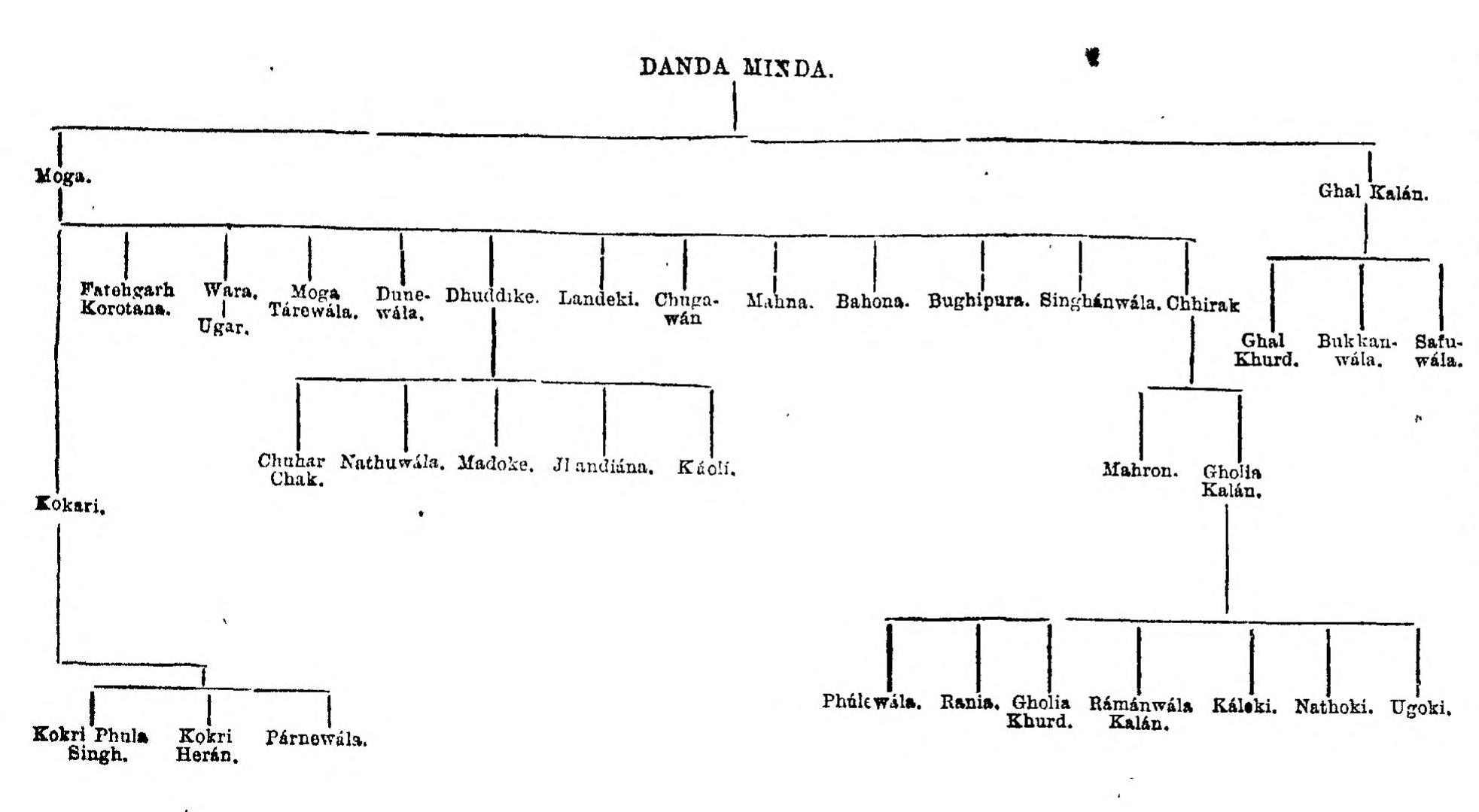
Village chart of Moga region showing the connection of the principal villages established by Gill Jats to each-other, Gazetteer of the Ferozepore District, 1888–89

The region of Moga is mentioned in Punjabi folklore. The settlement of Moga (later a town and now a city) was established around 500-years-ago in around the late 15th or 16th century, as per one source. However, other sources date the establishment of Moga to a later period. According to the 2011 district census handbook for Moga district, the Wadan Gills, one of the twelve branches of the Gill Jats, were settled in the southern and western areas of the present-day district in around the early 17th century. However, a branch of the Sidhu Jats, known as the Brars, particularly the Sangar clan of the Brars, attacked the Gills and therefore the Gills settled further northword, establishing the settlements of Moga, Chhirak, and Chal. Peace was made between the antagonistic Gill and Sangar Jatts through a marital alliance, with a daughter of the Sangar Jatts being married to a Gill Jat, which improved the social-standing of the Brars in the area. Two sons were produced from this marriage: Vega and Moga. The settlement of Moga was named after the son Moga, born from a Wadan Gill father and Sangar Brar mother.

However, there are variations to the same tale. A per another local dictum, the two brothers were named Moga Singh and Joga Singh. (Note: 'Moga Singh' is also known as 'Moga Gill'.) Joga Singh's successors established two different villages called Moga Mehla Singh and Moga Ajit Singh. The settlement of Moga was formed by combining these two villages together, with the village being divided into five pattis (meaning "part"), named after Moga Singh's sons: Chirag Patti, Sangali Patti, Ausang Patti, Bagha Patti, and Rupa Patti.

A similar background story is recounted in Visakha Singh's Malwa Itihās. According to Visakha Singh, Moga had been established in the 1st century CE by Raja Mog, who established Mog Badh on the southern bank of Sutlej. However, the settlement was destroyed during the Huna invasion of the Indian subcontinent, with Tihara and Janer also being annihalated. As for the establishment of the re-built Moga, the Gills of Moga are credited by Visakha Singh. According to him, the Gills of Moga trace their origin back to Bathinda, specifically the ruling dynasty of Binaypal. When Binaypal's dynasty in Bathinda was destroyed by a ruler named Mahmud, the Gills are said to have dispersed from the area to settle elsewhere, establishing new villages in the process. One branch of the Gills who left Bathinda went-on to found the settlement of Vairoke, headed by an individual named Moga Gill. It was Moga Gill's group who re-established the settlement of Moga on-top of the ruins of the much earlier 'Mog Badh'. Local folklore claims that Moga Gill and Rattan Mal, who had betrayed the Binaypal dynasty of Bathinda, were in conflict with one another, with Rattan Mal attacking the Gills at Vairoke, causing its destruction. The folktales involve curses and religious sages, with Moga Gill apparently being cursed by Rattan Mal to die childless. However, a Muslim sai (saint) heard of Moga Gill's curse and supposedly blessed him after forty-two days of praying that Moga's descendants will found forty-two villages, on the grounds of the first-child being given to the sai. The first child of Moga was named Aval Khair, who founded the settlement of Aval Khurana, becoming its chaudary (head). (Note: Aval Khair's name is also spelt as 'Awwall Khair'.) There were also other descendants of Moga Gill apart from Aval Khair, who founded their own villages as well. The feud between Rattan Mal and the Gills of Moga reach a conclusion in the tales, with the Gills (descendants of Aval Khair and other Gill branches of Moga) allying with Kalu Nath and Sidh Bhoi to defeat Rattan Mal. To commemorate Sidh Bhoi of the Dhaliwals, the Gills constructed many memorials to him, such as on the outskirts of Lopo near Badhni, at Rajeana near Bagha Purana, and another nearby Lallu Wal village. (Note: Sidh Bhoi is also spelt as 'Sidh Bhoe'.)

Guru Hargobind (left) and Guru Har Rai (right), under whose guruship conducted missionary tours in the area of present-day Moga district
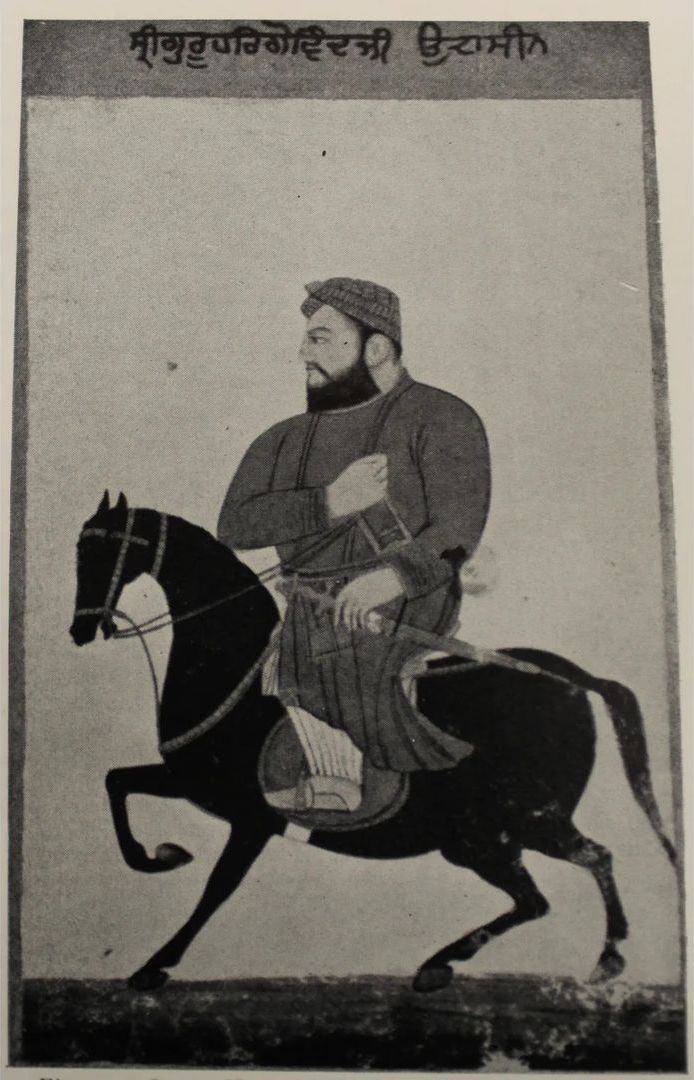
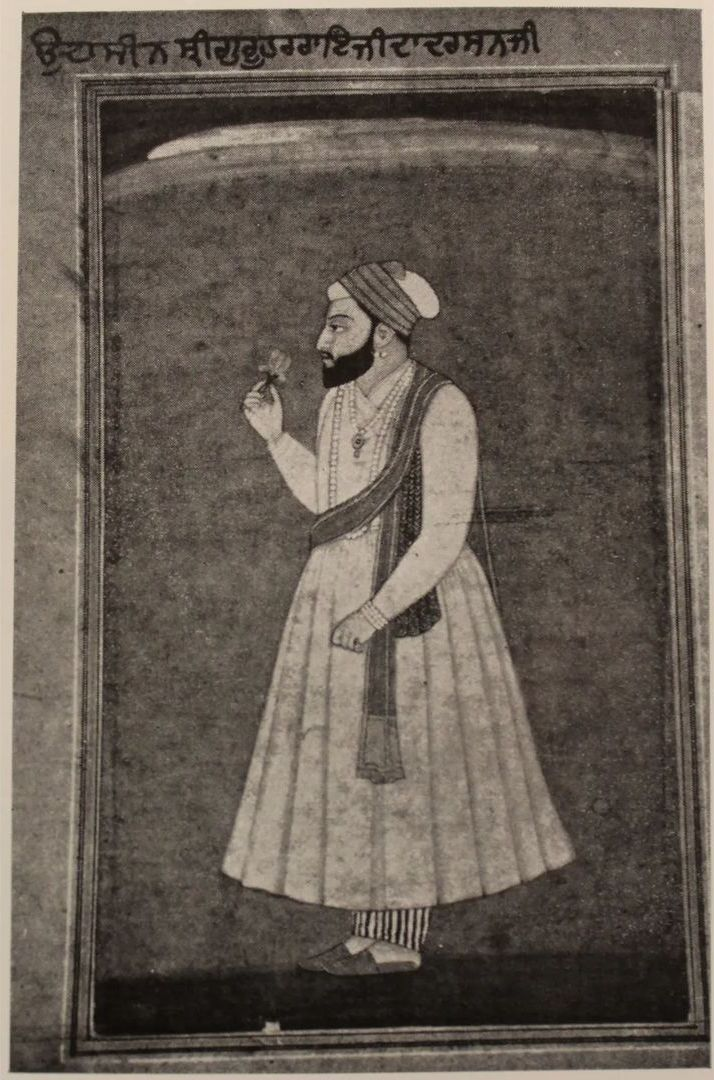

Despite the Moga region being under nominal Muslim-rule, in-reality the influences of the dominant Jatt tribes of the area prevailed, namely the Gills and Dhaliwals, consisting of clan-chieftainships (chaudharis). During the early Mughal-Sikh Wars, in 1634 Guru Hargobind left Amritsar to avoid Mughal persecution and arrived near Moga with fresh recruits enlisted en route to stage a counter-attack against the Mughal government. When near Moga, he sent his family to safety in Kartarpur and whilst he remained in the Malwa region with his army. According to Visakha Singh, the local Gill and Dhaliwal tribes (including Rai Jodh of Kangar) of the Moga region, provided military assistance to Guru Hargobind during the Battle of Mehraj.

Most of the Jat tribes of the local area were converted to Sikhism by the missionary works of the seventh Guru of the Sikhs, Har Rai. At Dagru village in Moga district, it is believed Guru Har Rai stayed there for some time whilst on a tour of the Malwa region. Gurdwara Tambu Sahib was later constructed to commemorate his stay in the area.

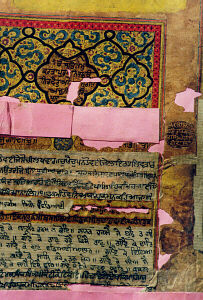
A folio of a historical Guru Granth Sahib manuscript bearing Guru Gobind Singh’s Gurmukhi seal is preserved by releative of Mata Damodari (wife of Guru Hargobind) at Gurdwara Daroli Bhai ki, village, Moga district, Punjab.

According to Sikh tradition, the village of Dina located near the district's border with the neighbouring Bathinda district is where Guru Gobind Singh rested for a few days after the Second Battle of Chamkaur. Furthermore, it is said he wrote and dispatched the Zafarnama letter to Aurangzeb from here. Scholar Louis E. Fenech states the Guru rested at Dina at the house (specifically an upper story room called a chubārā) of a local Sikh named Bhai Desu Tarkhan after sending the Zafarnama from Kangar village, entrusted in the hands of Bhai Dharam Singh and Bhai Daya Singh. A gurdwara, Zafarnama Gurdwara Lohgarh Sahib Pind Dina Patishahi Dasvin, commemorates his stay at Dina, Moga, and a sign there claims the Guru stayed at the location for 3 months and 13 days. The Encyclopedia of Sikhism states the Guru only stayed at Dina for a few days conversely to the claims of the Gurdwara. It further states that he stayed with two local Sikhs named Chaudhry Shamir and Lakhmir, the grandsons of a local chieftain named Rai Jodh, who had served the sixth Sikh guru, Hargobind, and fought and died at the Battle of Mehraj. Guru Gobind Singh gathered an army of hundreds of locals from Dina and the surrounding area and continued on his journey.

In 1715 CE, Nawab Ise Khan, the Manj governor, stirred a rebellion against the Mughal hegemony but was defeated and killed. In 1760 CE, the ascendency of Sikh power became grounded after the defeat of Adina Beg, who was the last Mughal governor of Lahore.

=== Modern era ===
==== Sikh period ====
Map created by the British East India Company of the Malwa region of Punjab showing the various polities, borders, and settlements of the area, ca.1829–1835. The area of Moga (spelt as "Mogha") is shown as being part of the Lahore State (Sikh Empire).

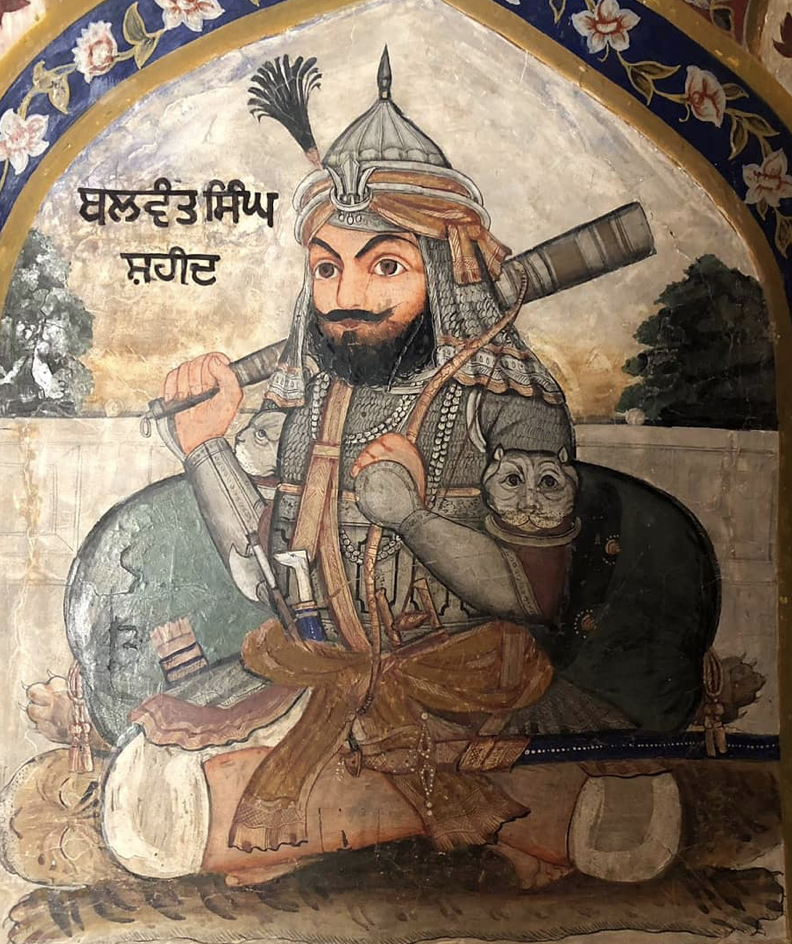
Mural painting of Balwant Singh of Shaheedan Misl, who hailed from the Ilaka of Nihal Singh Wala in present-day Moga district, circa late 19th century

The Nishanwalia Misl was based in Singhanwala village of Moga district. Bhuma Singh Dhillon, who succeeded as the second leader of the Bhangi Misl, was born in Hung village located in the Wadni parganah of Moga district. The forces of Tara Singh, the misldar of the Dallewalia Misl of the Sikh Confederacy, led incursions into modern-day Moga district, conquering all the way to Ramuwala and Mari. Fortresses (ਕਿਲਾ Kilā in Punjabi) were constructed at both of these places by the Sikh misl. The local nawab of Kot Ise Khan in modern-day Moga district became a protectorate of the Ahluwalia Misl. In 1763-64, Gujar Singh, his brother Nusbaha Singh, and his two nephews, Gurbaksh Singh and Mastan Singh, of the Bhangi Misl, crossed the Sutlej river after a sacking of Kasur and gained control of the Firozepur area (including Moga) whilst Jai Singh Gharia, another band from the same quarters, seized Khai, Wan, and Bazidpur, and subordinated them. Sada Kaur owned estates in Wadni, near modern-day Moga city. The area of Moga was one of the 45 taluqas (subdistrict) south of the Sutlej River that was claimed by Maharaja Ranjit Singh as belonging to or claimed by him through Sada Kaur as per a list by Captain William Murray on 17 March 1828. Kalsia State also held territory in the region.

==== British period ====
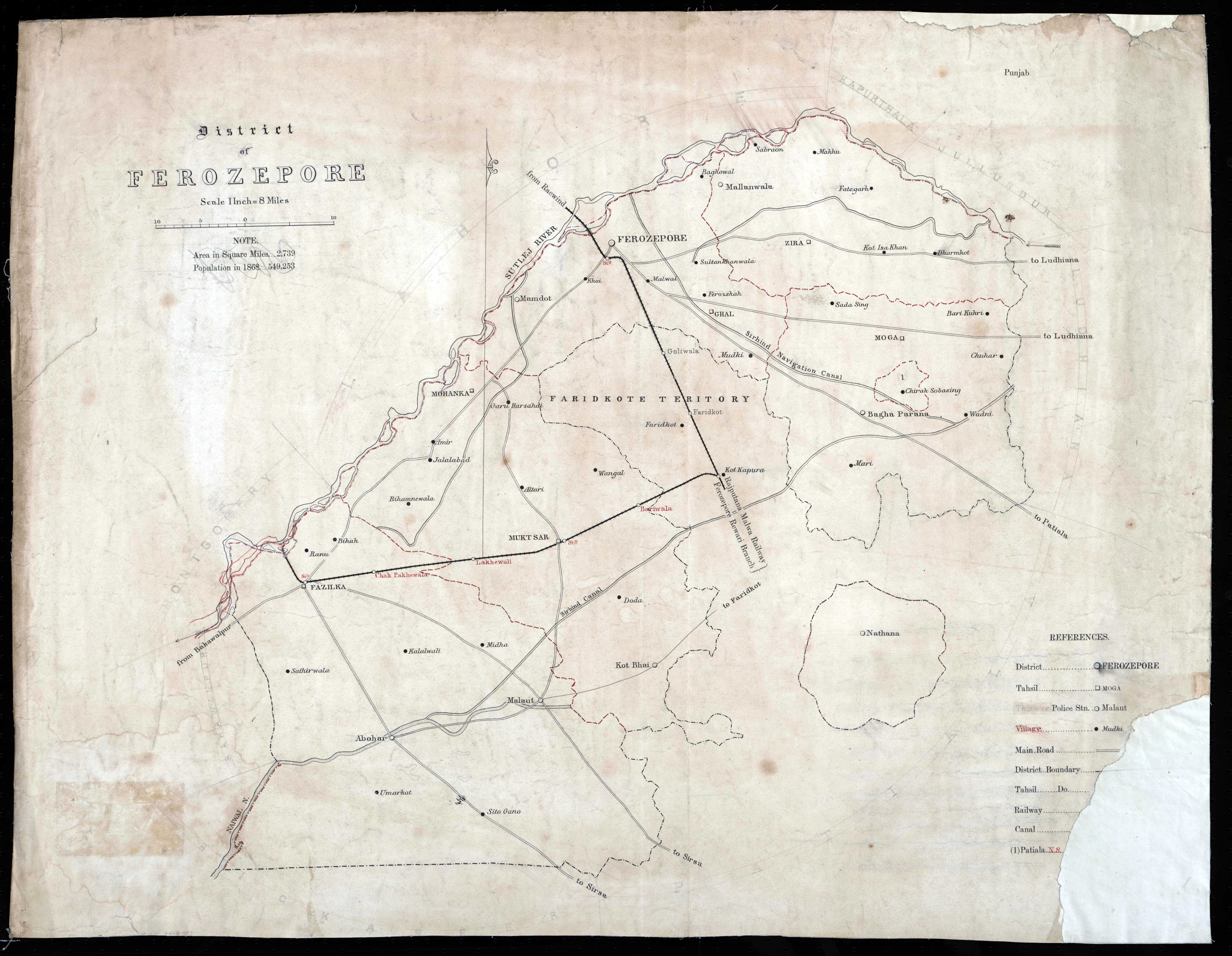
Map of Ferozepore District, 1868. Moga sub-district can be seen in the eastern part of the district.

During the First Anglo-Sikh War, the forces of the Sikh Empire crossed the river Sutlej on 16 December 1845, and fought battles at Mudki, Firozshah, Aliwal, and Sabraon. The Sikh forces were defeated by the British and retreated back beyond the Sutlej. After the war, the British acquired all former territory of the Lahore Darbar south and east of the Sutlej. Ferozepore district was annexed by the British from its former Sikh rulers after the First Anglo-Sikh War of 1845–1846. When the Sutlej campaign drew to a close at the end of 1846, the territories of Khai, Baghuwala, Ambarhar, Zira, and Mudki, with portions of Kot Kapura, Guru Har Sahai, Jhumba, Kot Bhai, Bhuchcho, and Mahraj were added to the Firozepur district. Other acquisitions by the British were divided between the Badhni and Ludhiana districts. In 1847, the Badhni district was dissolved and the following areas were incorporated into the Firozepur district: Mallanwala, Makhu, Dharmkot, Kot Ise Khan, Badhni, Chuhar Chak, Mari, and Sadasinghwala.

Mahraj Ilaka was a group of 38 villages that formed a British-administered exclave of Moga tehsil, entirely surrounded by Phulkia & Faridkot State during the British era.

While the Charik Ilaka was an enclave within the district, it historically comprised eight villages, with the main village of Chhirak founded by a man named Jhanda, a subject of the Rai of Raikot. During the decline of the Empire, Jhanda’s successors came under the protection of the Chief of Kalsia. In 1855, the British administration restored the Chhirak Ilaka to the Sardar of Kalsia state after determining that its earlier inclusion under British control was based on a misleading claim by Sardar Dewa Singh.

During the Mutiny of 1857, there were reports of a Roman Catholic church being burnt down amongst other buildings of the colonial establishment in Firozepur district during sparks of tension.

During the late 19th century, the Kuka movement was prevalent in the areas of Moga, with many of its followers drawing from the laypersons of the district. The Kukas are believed to be one of the first resistance movement of the subcontinent towards Indian independence from European powers.

In 1899, a co-educational school was founded in Moga (then in the Ferozpore district) by the Dev Samaj.The Dev Samaj school was later upgraded to become the Dev Samaj High School.

In 1901, the railway reached Moga locality and former jagir lands of Moga Gill were converted into the settlement. At that era, Moga locality was an important location for the tea trade, which led to the coining of the phrase: Moga chah joga (meaning "Moga only has tea").

In 1901, a plague was ravaging the local region, including Moga. However, there were not enough huts established to treat victims and infected and non-infected persons were requested to congregate in the camps, increasing the infections.

In 1894, the Christian missionary Rev. John Hyde, commonly known as "Praying Hyde", arrived in India and worked in the areas of Ferozepore and Moga. In the early 20th century, a Christian missionary named Ray Harrison Carter drafted a "Moga plan" for the betterment of destitute Christian converts in Moga by establishing village schools and a training school focusing on agricultural education. One of these educational institutions established by the Christian missionaries was the 'Moga Training School for Village Teachers', which was established in 1908 by the American Presbyterian Mission and conceived by Ray Harrison Carter. The principal of the missionary school from 1914 to 1925 was William McKee, an American. The institution focused on spreading Christianity throughout the villages of Moga. Some of the missionaries who served at the institution were women, such as Arthur E. Harper and Irene Mason Harper. Arthur Harper and Irene Harper, both Americans, served at the missionary institution from 1914 until their retirement in 1952. The Moga School became renowned internationally for its approach to rural reconstruction by combining principles of self-help, character-building, and "practical agricultural demonstration", and it published its own periodical titled Village Teachers' Journal.

In November 1914, two officials were shot dead in Moga by Ghadarites during a raid on a local treasury. In March 1921, pro-Gandhi slogans were raised by passengers disembarking from a train at Moga, who refused to present their tickets to the station-master.

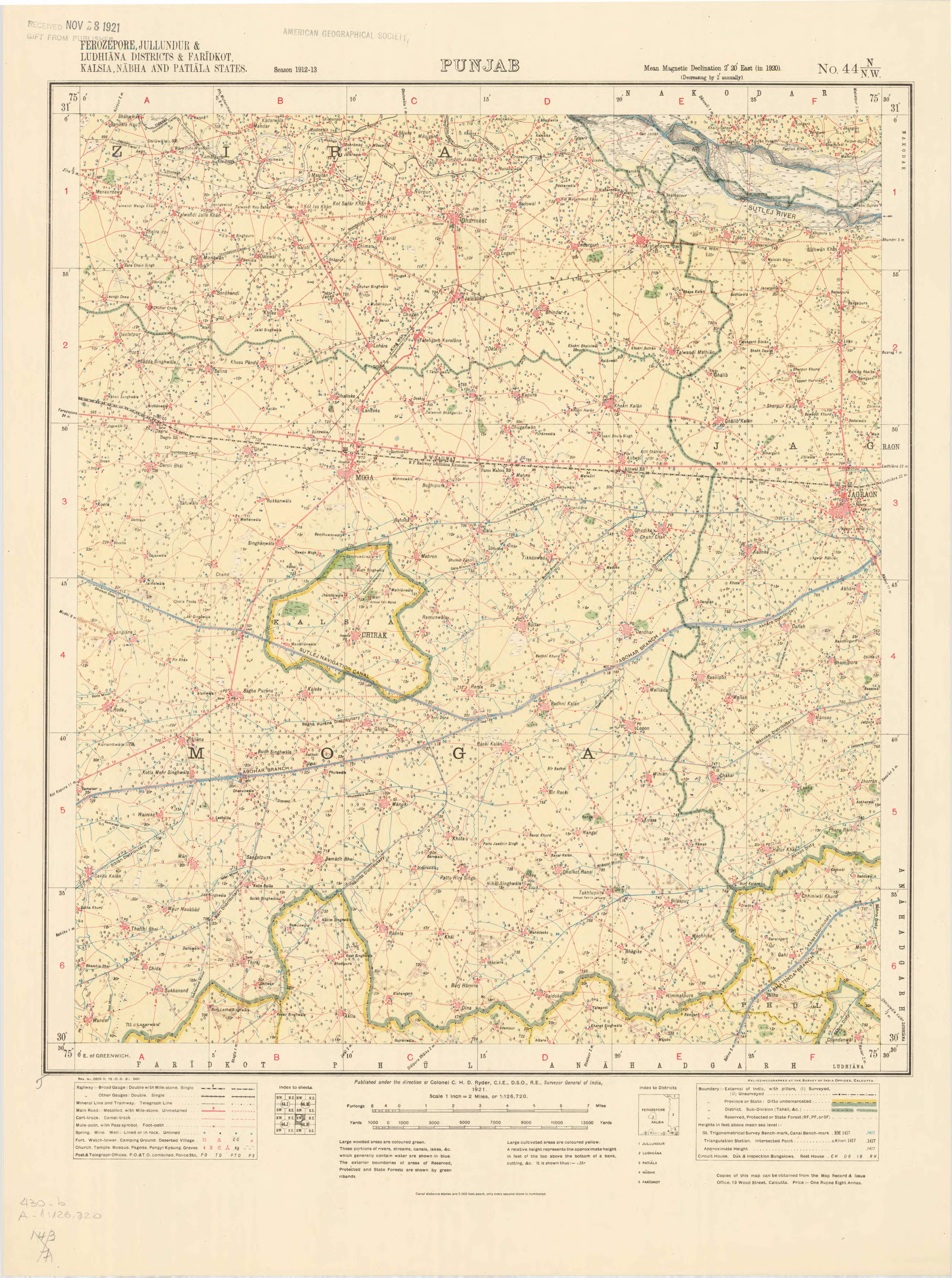
Map of much of Moga tehsil (excluding the western areas), Survey of India geographical block-map for 44 N NW Ferozepore (1921)

In 1926, the Dayanand Mathra Dass College was established in present-day Moga city, making the city one of the few to have had an established college within it prior to independence. (Note: The college is popularly abbreviated at 'D. M. College'.) Moga locality was the headquarters of eye-surgeon Mathra Das Pahwa, who established a hospital there in 1927, where he operated on cataract patients free-of-charge. A large amount of cataract patients were treated over the years by Mathra Das Pahwa, with an operation of his being witnessed by Mahatma Gandhi.

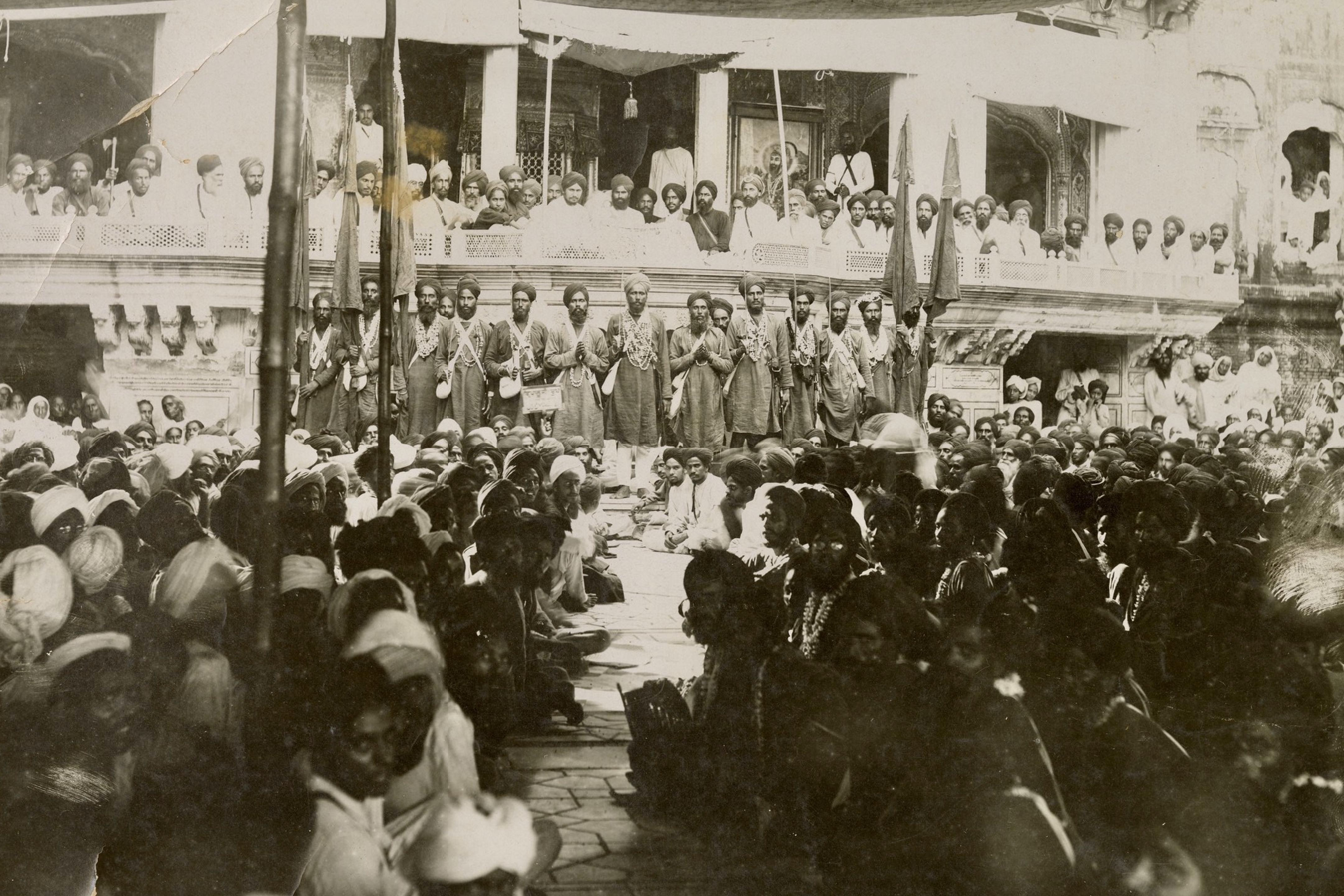
12th Shahidi Jatha ('Band of Martyrs') involved in the Jaito Morcha (agitation) takes its blessings at Akal Takht under the leadership of Jathedars Sucha Singh of Moga and Kanwar Singh, ca.1924

During the Indian Independence Movement, many revolutionaries came from Moga district. Many of them were tried and executed as a result of their activities against the colonial government.

During the third Round Table Conference held in December 1932, the Akalis boycotted the talks so the colonial government sponsored Sardar Tara Singh of Moga as the Sikh representative to the talks. (Note: Sardar Tara Singh of Moga is not to be confused with Master Tara Singh.) Tara Singh of Moga was disowned by the Khalsa Darbar as a result of this.In 1934, Malcolm Darling wrote that the settlement of Moga had a population of around 15,000 people.

During a tour of Punjab in 1938, Nehru visited Moga town and met with Ghadar/Kirti leaders and socialist workers.

In September 1938, agrarian protestors in parts of present-day Moga district under Kalsia State back then were protesting excessive land revenue, requesting a reduction of them, when they were lathi-charged by state police. The cattle fairs at Chirak village (that was held between 11 September 1938 and 20 September 1938) and Mari village was boycotted by the farmers' leaders, leading to a loss of revenue for Kalsia State. This movement was known as the "Kalsia agitation" and around 125 were arrested and held at a jail in Chhachroli, in poor conditions. Moga was the centre of the agitation.

At the end of June in 1939, another agriculturalist movement arose in Chuhar Chak village over farmers wanting to stop paying the chowkidara tax, which had long been a demand. A delegation of the farmers sent to Moga town to meet with the tehsildar were arrested for tax non-payment. With news spreading of the arrests, jathas arrived in Moga from Chuhar Chak village and over a period of a few days, around 350 people (incl. 50 women) courted arrest. The agitation effectively wanted to end payment of land revenue. However, the Punjab Kisan Committee, distracted by other concerns at the time involving the Lahore Kisan Morcha, and not wanting to divert more of its resources, suspended the Chuhar Chak agitation by commanding the local committee to stop it.

===== Partition of Punjab =====
Leading up to the partition of Punjab in 1947, the Sikhs of Moga were considered "battle-ready". Prior to partition, Moga tehsil was one of the only two tehsils of British Punjab that had a Sikh-majority, with the other being Tarn Taran tehsil. Whilst travelling around tehsils of Punjab, Professor Quraishi of the Muslim League was preparing a list of tehsils based on their religious composition, with Muslim-majority areas being considered grounds for areas of inclusion into a conceptual Pakistan. However, the list notes that Moga was "predominantly Hindu". In July 1947, 80,000 ruppees were collected from the Moga grain market to purchase weapons to be used against local Muslims of Moga. Furthermore, an Akali martyr squad named Khalsa Sewak Dal was organized. The Hindu organization, Rashtriya Sawayamsevak Sangh (R.S.S.), also made a resolve against the Muslims of Moga. A local Muslim League leader named Sukh Annyat hired trucks and left the city with property and family. However, his brother Hadayat Khan was murdered in the violence of partition by the son of an RSS leader named Lala Ram Rakha Sud, who was in-charge of the local RSS outfit. On 1 August 1947, Sikhs massacred eighteen Muslim villagers in Kokri village and the murderers were absolved by the Ferozepore Deputy Commissioner, by claiming the Muslims were murdered over "mutual conflict over a relationship". The next day on 2 August 1947, six Muslim mendicants were murdered near the Ludhiana-Moga railway line, with the deceased victims being accused of being bomb-makers. News of these two incidents created further communal tensions in the region, especially amongst the rural villages, with Sikhs and Hindus being pitted against Muslims and vice versa. The advice of village elders appealing for calm was ignored, and violence, looting, and killing erupted in the area. The Muslim-majority village of Athhur (Hatur) assaulted the Sikhs, with all of the inhabitants of the village being butchered in the aftermath after three days of fighting. In Pato Hira Singh village, around 250 Muslim inhabitants were murdered. Curfew was put in-place on 17 August 1947, however by 23 August 1947, there were reportedly no Muslims to be found any longer in Moga town and the surrounding villages, with the former Muslims having fled as refugees over the Radcliffe Line into Western Punjab. When Robert Atkins visited Moga town during the partition of India, he recounts that he witnessed mutilated bodies strewn over the town resulting from a massacre that occurred there. Moga was one of the regions of the Punjab that had experienced heavy losses in human lives and property during the partition. The aftermath of partition had a negative impact on the local economy of the Moga area. Almost all of the local Muslims of Moga had migrated to Pakistan and meanwhile, many non-local Hindus and Sikhs from western Punjab settled in the Moga area.

==== Post-independence ====
Faridkot State (then-ruled by Raja Harinder Singh) and Moga and Muktsar tehsils became independent from British-rule in 1947. Following the Partition of Punjab Province, Ferozepur district (which at that time included Moga and Muktsar tehsils which were later transferred to Faridkot district in 1972)—including Moga tehsil and others—became part of India. Amid the communal violence and mass migrations, a total of 349,767 Sikh, hindu refugees from areas that became part of Pakistan settled in Ferozepur district, as recorded in the 1951 Census of India. Much of this refugee population hailed from Bahawalpur State and the districts of Montgomery, Sheikhupura, Lyallpur, and Lahore, crossing the border into Ferozepur. Around 80 percent of these refugees settled in rural areas, while approximately 20 percent settled in urban parts of the district.

Faridkot State, accepted dominion of the Indian Union and became a tehsil of Bathinda district. Bathinda district itself became part of the PEPSU in 1948, which was later merged into the state of Punjab in 1956. While the Charik area group of 7 villages—an exclave of Kalsia State and an enclave of Moga tehsil—also became part of Bathinda district, it was transferred to Moga tehsil of Ferozepur district in 1950 by Absorption of Enclaves Order. Additionally, the Maharaj ilaqa, a group of 38 villages that formed an exclave of Moga tehsil, became part of the Ferozepur tehsil exclave and was later transferred to Bathinda district in 1959.

On 24 September 1954, the 12th session of the All India Kisan Sabha (AIKS) was held at Moga, with a decision to form an organization that was separate from the AIKS being decided at the meeting.

Due to the protectionist policies of the Indian government that required international firms to set-up local production in some industries, the Nestlé company decided to establish its first Indian factory at Moga in 1961. The factory began service on 9 February 1962. According to Hwy-Chang Moon, the establishment of the Nestlé factory led to an increase of development in the district. In the early 1960s, the Moga area was poor and undeveloped, with there being a dearth of infrastructure (such as electricity, transportation, telephones, or medical-care) and the typical agricultural family owned less than five acres of poorly-irrigated land that had low fertility. Nestlé initially could only procure dairy from 180 local farmers. The typical household only had access to poor-quality milk that was oftentimes contaminated and could not be transported faraway, due to a lack of refrigeration, poor transportation, and the non-existence of quality control of dairy. Whilst local families kept livestock, they typically only had one cow that could only produce enough milk to meet the familial needs and most calves did not survive to adulthood. Thus, Moon argues that with the coming of Nestlé into the local area, the company brought-in experts (including veterinarians, nutritionists, agronomists, etc.), educated the local populace on modern animal husbandry and agriculture through monthly training sessions (teaching them modern dairy farming techniques, irrigation, and crop-management practices), and developed the local infrastructure. With these financial and technological investments, it allowed local farmers to dig deeper wells that improved irrigation, and soon farmers were producing surpluses of crops and the survival rates of livestock increased, increasing the development of the area. Nestlé also helped with the construction of local village-schools, drinking-water facilities, and toilets, in the area and provided the local farmers with cattle-feed, fodder seeds, veterinary medicines, mineral mixtures, and bank loans. With the quality of milk in the area being improved, Nestlé started paying local producers higher amounts for their products than what was set by the Indian government, with the company purchasing at biweekly intervals and this income for farmers helping them get bank credit. The company also helped establish clinics to help tuberculosis patients. Moon describes the situation as a win-win, with Nestlé profiting from the expanded local market whilst locals benefit from the economic and infrastructural development of the region. All of this led to the development of an industrial cluster at Moga.

An event called the All-India Workers' Conference was held in Moga in September 1968, establishing the Bharatiya Khet Mazdoor Union with a membership of 251,000 at the time. The areas of Moga district were heavily effected by Communist insurgencies in the latter half of the 20th century, being one of the worst affected areas of the state of Punjab.

On 5 October 1972, a group of people were protesting against the black marketing of tickets at a movie theatre in Moga when police opened fire on them, leading to the deaths of four people. Two students, Harjit Singh and Swarn Singh of Charrik village, and passersbys Gurdev Singh and Kewal Krishan, were killed in the police firing, near Regal Cinema in Moga. The incident lead to a movement known as the Moga agitation, a student movement which was led by leftist groups where protestors set afire government buildings and public transport for two months. (Note: The incident is also known as Moga Goli Kand 1972 and the movement born from the incident is also known as the 'Moga-Regal Cinema Movement'.) The student movement had ramifications throughout the Punjab. The Punjab Students Union (PSU) was formed the same year. In 1972, PSU president Iqbal Khan and general secretary Pirthipal Singh Randhawa led protests against the price rise and the black marketing of cinema tickets. A library would later be established at former location of Regal Cinema to commemorate the martyred students. The incident has been likened to the earlier Jallianwala Bagh massacre of 1919. At the Moga Sangram Rally of 1974, the Congress-run government of Indira Gandhi was challenged. The PSU later opposed the bus fare hike in 1979.

In the 1970s, the historical fortress of Sada Kaur at Wadhni (south of Moga city) was demolished and a gurdwara and statue honouring Sada Kaur was erected at the location of the destroyed fort.

During the period of Jarnail Singh Bhindranwale, a common story that Bhindranwale told was about a Sikh girl being stripped naked by Hindus in a village near Moga, with the girl's father supposedly being forced to engage in intercourse with her. However, when Bhindranwale was pressed for further details to investigate and confirm the story, he became agitated and hostile. During the time period of Dharam Yudh Morcha, Sikh militants (and allegedly foreign personnel) were sheltering in gurdwaras in Moga town, thus an order was given on 30 May that the temples should be sieged by BSF paramilitary forces until the militants inside them surrendered, however the Sikh priests of Amritsar protested the siege and threatened to lead a march toward Moga. The government eventually backed down and doing so may have emboldened Bhindranwale and his followers to hole-up in Sikh shrines.

On 26 June 1989, during the Punjab insurgency, an event known as the Moga massacre occurred, when suspected Khalistani militants opened fire on RSS workers undergoing a morning exercise and socialization session in Nehru Park in Moga city. The attack led to the deaths of 24 people and was suspected of being carried out by the Khalistan Commando Force. Moga district also experienced encounter-killings during the insurgency, such as the case of Bharpur Singh (aged 21), Bobby Monga, and Satnam Singh, on the Moga-Talwandi road at Khukhrana village on 27–28 December 1990. The three were travelling together through Moga when a police group led by Mangal Singh indiscriminately fired on them, killing Bharpur and Bobby but Satnam survived, with the police characterizing the incident as "cross firing between the police and militants".

In 1996, at a historic conference in Moga known as the Moga Conference, the Shiromani Akali Dal adopted a moderate Punjabi agenda and shifted its party headquarters from Amritsar to Chandigarh.

In 2003, Gursewak Singh Sodhi of Dhilwana Kalan village in Moga district was reprimanded by the SGPC for sending turban and clothing relics of Guru Gobind Singh to Canada to be displayed, in-exchange for money and gold.

In March 2013, around over 150 farmers were arrested during an agitation in the state. During the 2020–2021 Indian farmers' protest, many of the participants of the movement against the three farm bills hailed from Moga district. In-fact, the 2020–21 Indian farmers' protest originated from Moga, where 32 farmers' unions resolved to oppose the three farm bills and launch a protest against them.

The Guru Granth Sahib Bagh is an initiative of EcoSikh, working in-collaboration with PETALS, regarding the establishment and upkeeping of a garden near the historical Sikh shrine, Gurusar Sahib, located in Moga district. The garden was inaugurated in September 2021 and contains all fifty-eight plant species that find mention by name within the hymns of the Guru Granth Sahib. Each plant is accompanied by a stone with an engraving containing the relevant excerpt from the Sikh scripture mentioning the specie.

In April 2023, Sikh leader Amritpal Singh was arrested in a gurdwara in Moga city.

===== Creation of district =====
Originally, Moga used to be part of the Ferozepur district, but it was bifurcated and the then tehsils of Moga and Muktsar were transferred to the then-newly created Faridkot district on 7 August 1972. In 1972, a new Faridkot district was created by combining Faridkot tehsil (from Bathinda district) and the Moga and Muktsar tehsils (from Ferozepur district). From that point onwards, Moga was a subdivision of Faridkot district until the then Chief Minister of Punjab, Harcharan Singh Brar, agreed to the public request to make Moga a district on 24 November 1995. Later, in 1995, Moga & Nihal singh wala tehsil of Faridkot district was carved out to form the new Moga district. To create the district of Moga, the then tehsils of Moga and Bagha Purana tehsil of Faridkot district were joined to form Moga district. In 1999, Moga district expanded by gaining the Dharamkot block from Zira tehsil of Ferozepur district. This included 45 villages from Zira tehsil and 47 villages from Makhu sub-tehsil, along with the entire Dharamkot sub-tehsil of Zira tehsil of Ferozepur district. The judicial court system of Moga district was tied to Faridkot district's until Saturday, 28 April 2012, when it was officially separated in-order to speed-up the processing of judicial cases and ease the workload.

== Administrative divisions ==
Moga district, which occupies 2,216 square kilometres, is divided into two tehsils, two sub-tehsils, and four community development blocks. The two tehsils are: Bagha Purana and Nihal Singh Wala tehsils. The two sub-tehsils are: Badhni Kalan and Dharamkot sub-tehsils. According to the 2011 district census handbook for Moga district, there are three tehsils: Moga, Nihal Singhwala, and Bagha Purana tehsils.

Moga city is the headquarters of the district. The district contains around three towns and 180 villages. Moga is bordered by Ferozepur district to the north, Ludhiana district to the east, Sangrur district to the southeast, Bathinda district to the south, and Faridkot district to the west. Moga district is interconnected through roadways and railways to its neighbouring districts. A railway connects Ferozepur, Moga, and Ludhiana districts together. Moga district itself is part of the Firozpur division.

=== Subdistricts of Moga district ===
According to the Indian government's integrated online directory, Moga district is divided into the following subdistricts (tehsils/subdivisions) and blocks:

- Subdistricts
  1. Bagha Purana
  2. Dharamkot
  3. Moga
  4. Nihal Singhwala
- Blocks:
  1. Baghapurana
  2. Dharmkot
  3. Kot-Ise-Khan
  4. Moga-I
  5. Moga-II
  6. Nihal Singh Wala
- Sub-tehsils:
  1. Ajitwal
  2. Smalsar
  3. Badhni Kalan
  4. Kot-Ise-Khan
- Assembly Constituencies (with Assembly Code):
  1. Nihal Singh Wala (71)
  2. Baghapurana (72)
  3. Moga (73)
  4. Dharmkot (74)
- Courts:
  1. Moga (District & Session Court)
  2. Nihal Singh Wala (Sub-Division)
  3. Baghapurana (Sub-Division)
- Police Stations:
  1. City Moga
  2. Sadar Moga
  3. City South Moga
  4. Charik (Temp.)
  5. Baghapurana
  6. Samalsar
  7. Nihal Singh Wala
  8. Badhni kalan
  9. Ajitwal
  10. Dharmkot
  11. Kot Ise Khan
  12. Mehna
  13. Fateh garh Panjtoor

=== Localities ===
The towns of Bagha Purana, Badhni Kalan, Dharamkot, Kot Ise Khan, Nihal Singh Wala and Ghal Kalan fall in Moga district. The villages like Rattian Khosa Randhir, Dhalleke, Thathi Bhai, Rajiana, Dunne Ke, Landhe Ke, Samadh Bhai, Kotla Rai-ka, Bhekha, Bughipura, Daudhar, Dhudike, Lopon, Himmatpura, Manooke, Bahona, Karyal, and Chugawan, also fall within this district. Takhtupura Sahib is one of the well-known villages in this district. Takhtupura Sahib is a historical village.

Bagha Purana lies on the main road connecting Moga and Kotkapura and thus is a major hub for buses to all across Punjab. Bagha Purana's police station has the largest jurisdiction in Punjab; over 65 'pinds' or villages are within its control. The town is basically divided into 3 'pattis' or sections: Muglu Patti (the biggest one), Bagha Patti, and Purana Patti. The town has its fair share of rich people and thus the standard of living is above average as compared to the surrounding towns and villages.

Dharamkot is a city and a municipal council in the Moga district. Daudhar is the largest village in Moga.

== Culture ==
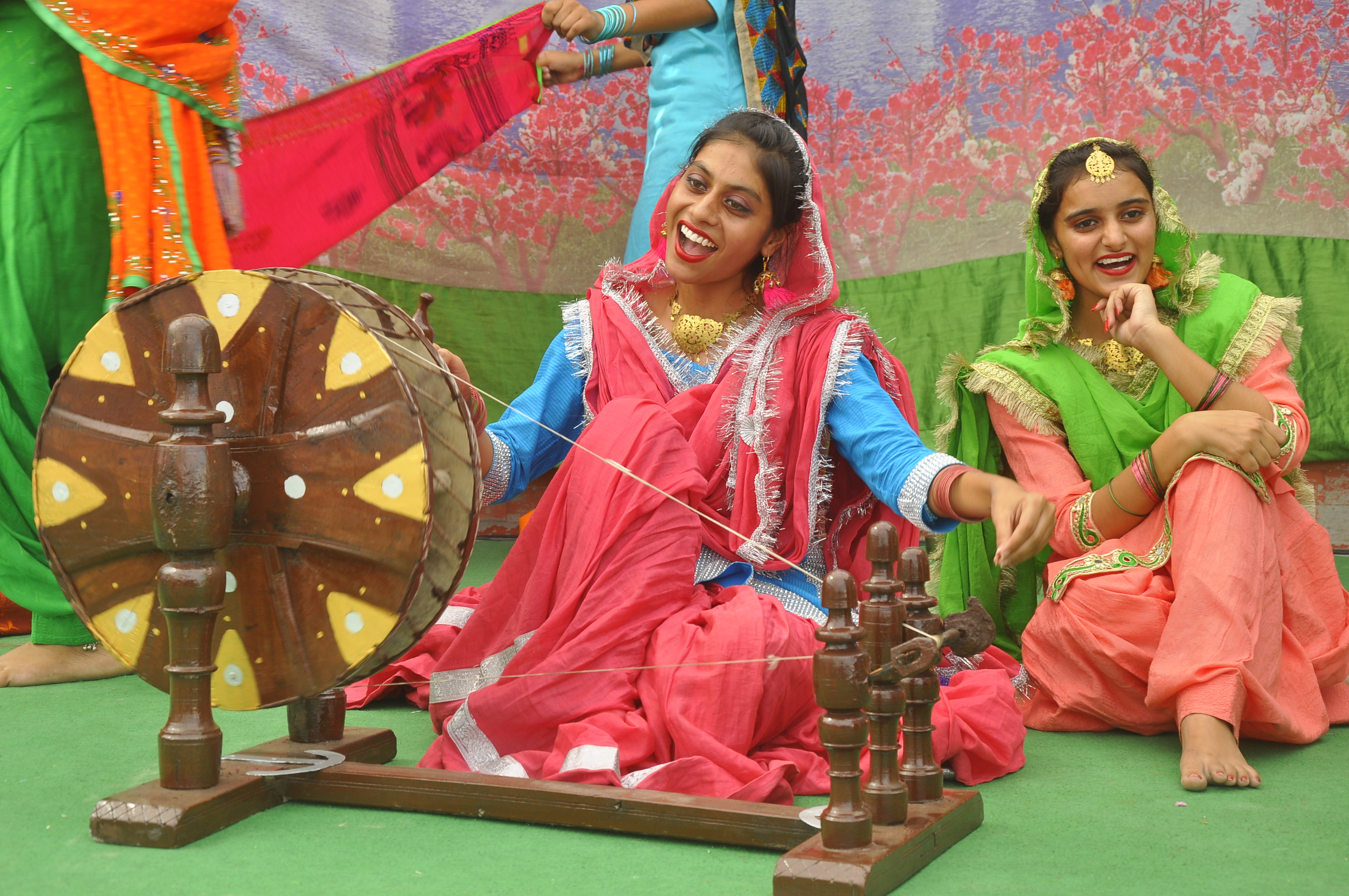
Punjabi cultural performance by students held at Panjab University Constituent College in Patto Hira Singh, Nihal Singh Wala tehsil, Moga district, Punjab, India, 18 October 2016

Malwai, the local dialect of Punjabi is spoken by local inhabitants.

=== Religious sites ===
Many historical gurdwaras associated with the Sikh gurus can be found in Moga district. There are gurdwaras associated with Guru Hargobind, Guru Har Rai, and Guru Gobind Singh, to be found in the district. There is a Punjabi folk shrine dedicated to the folk deity Lakhdata in Langiana village in Moga district. Shrines dedicated to Lakhdata are known as nigaha. A dhuna dedicated to Sri Chand can be found in Korewal village in Daroli Baike in Moga district, which as per oral tradition was established by a roaming sadhu.

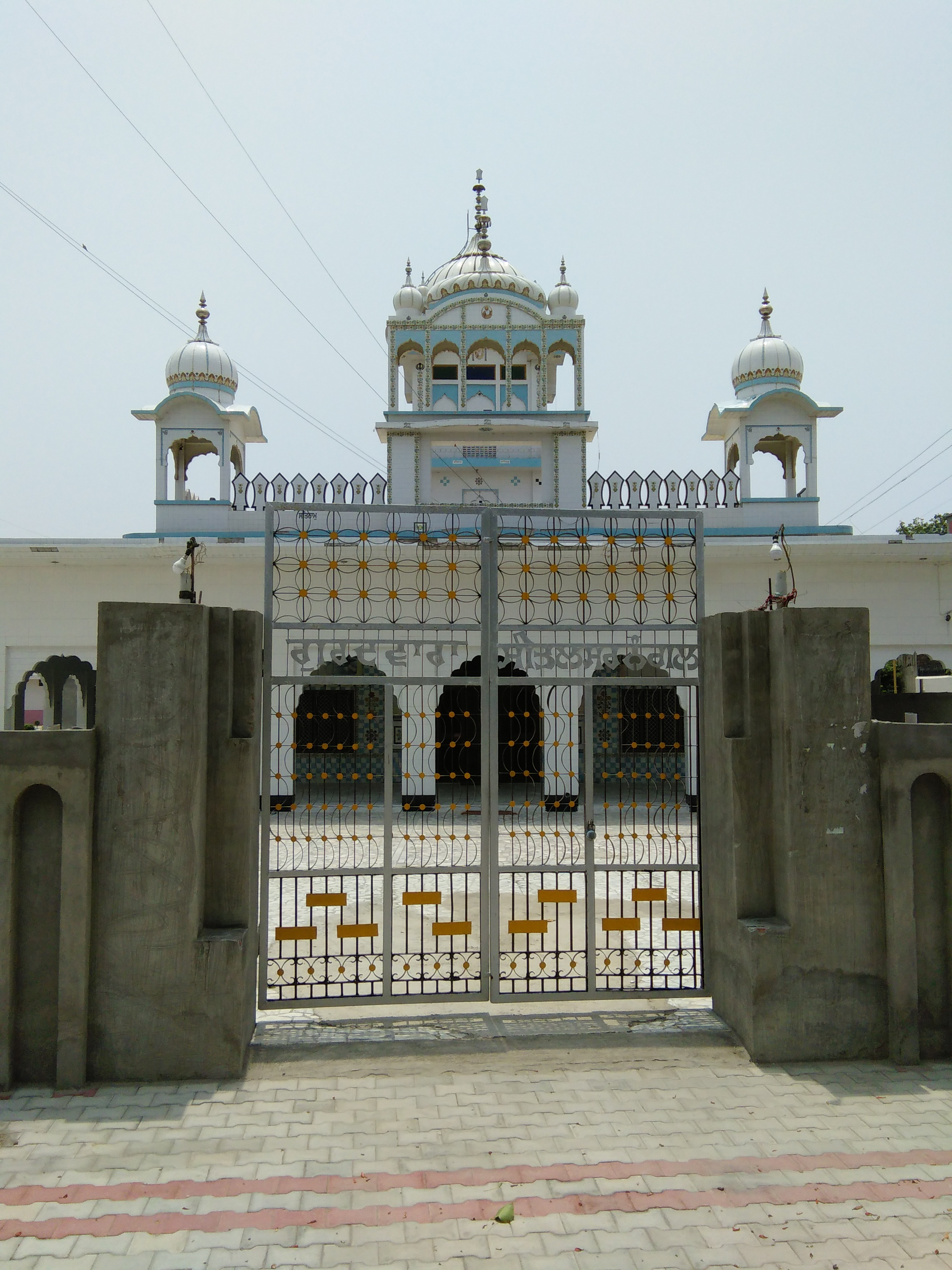
Gurdwara Seetal Sar, Nangal, Moga district, Punjab

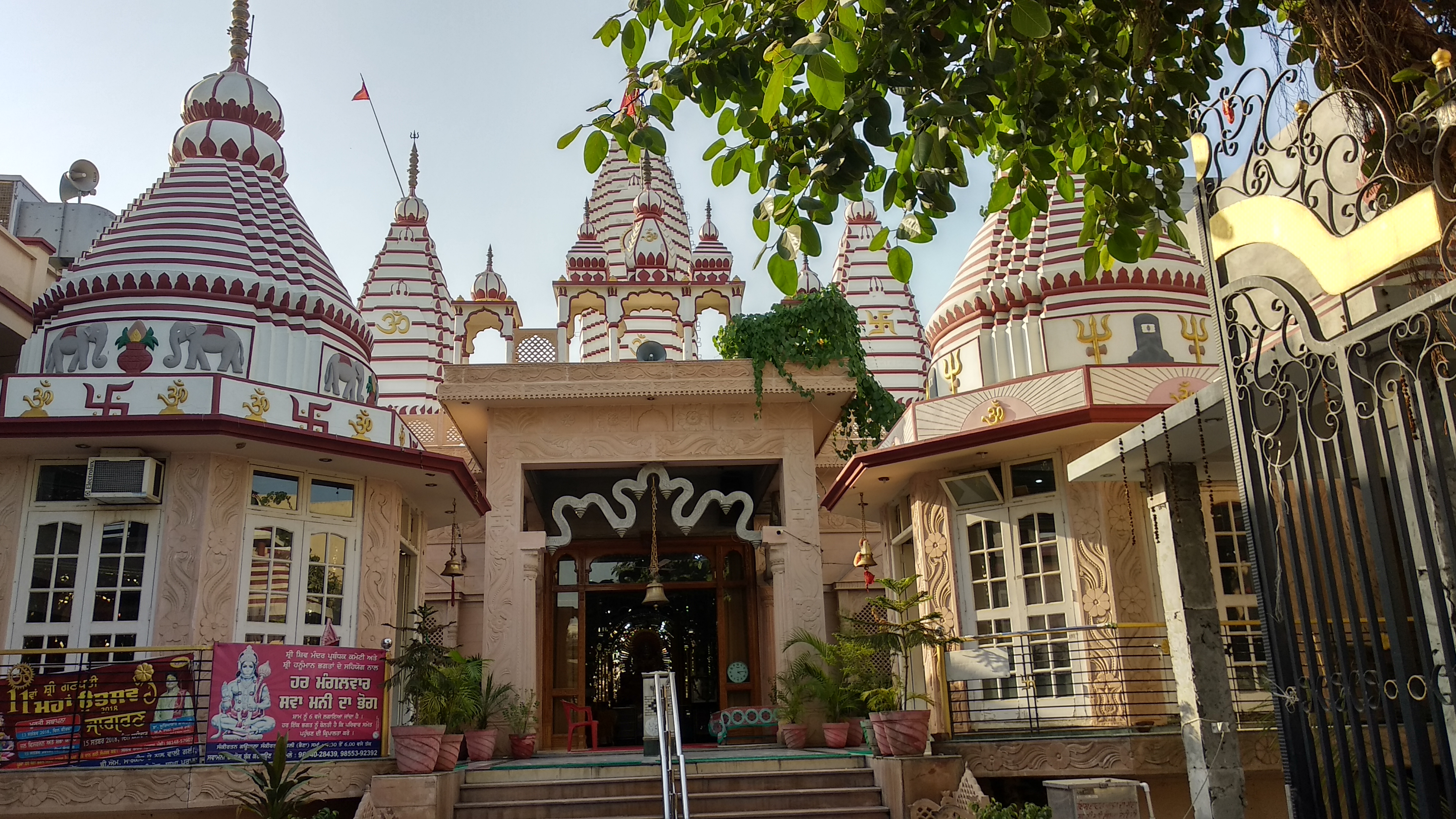
Shiv Mandir at Moga Road, Bagha Purana

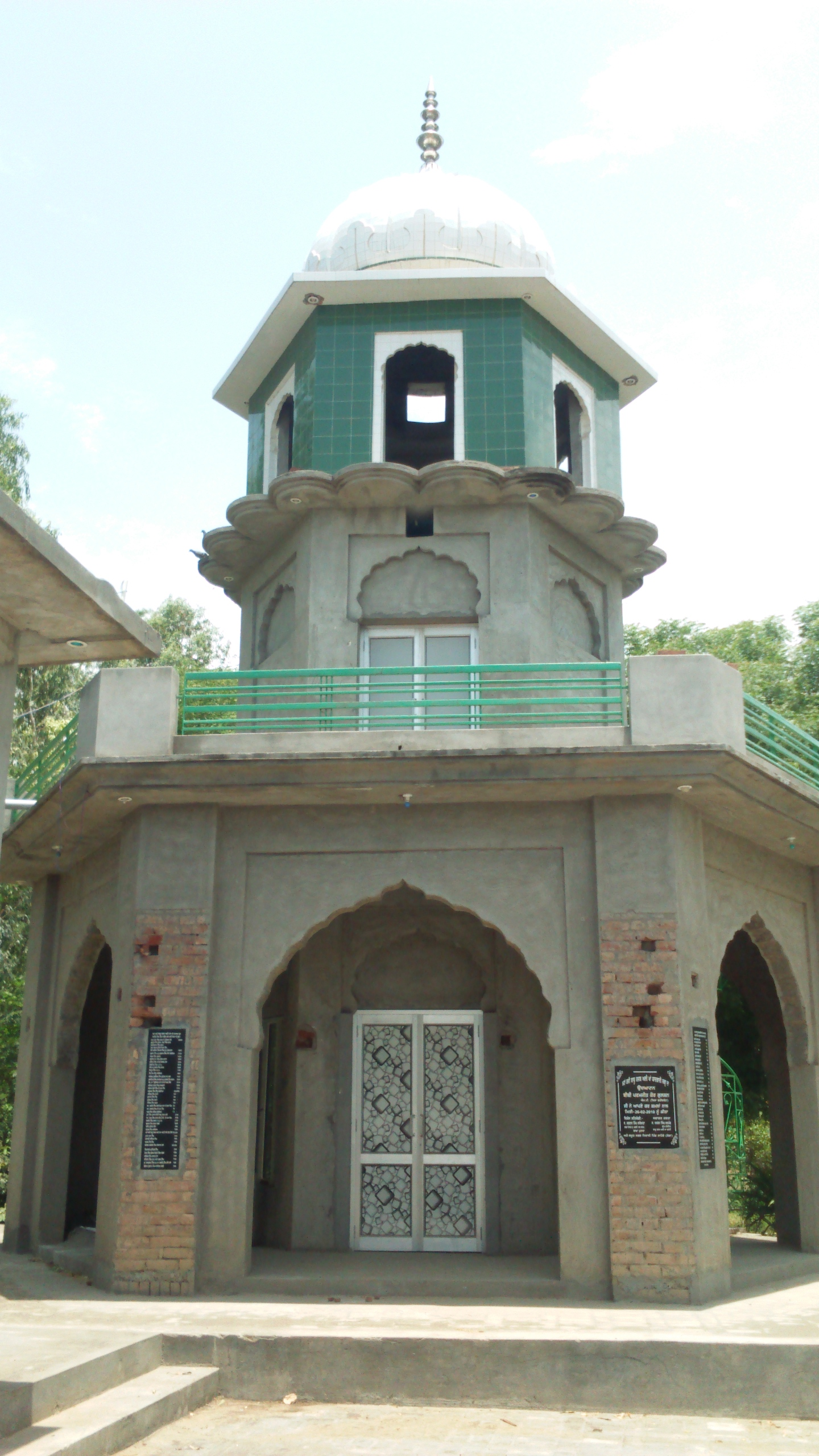
Yaadgaar Babu Rajab Ali Khan, Sahoke village, Moga district, Punjab

=== Festivals ===
Traditional celebrations, observations, and festivals include Guru Nanak Gurpurab, Guru Gobind Singh Gurpurab, Guru Arjan Shaheedi Diwas, Guru Tegh Bahadur Shaheedi Diwas, Basant, Vaisakhi, Hola Maholla, Shivratri, Ram Naumi, Janmashtami, Tis, Gugga Naumi. At Dina village, Zafarnama Diwan is also celebrated.

== Demographics ==
Historical population
Year	Pop.	±% p.a.
1951	379,181	—
1961	443,135	+1.57%
1971	536,623	+1.93%
1981	655,873	+2.03%
1991	777,894	+1.72%
2001	894,793	+1.41%
2011	995,746	+1.07%

In the 2001 census, Moga had a population of 886,313. According to the 2011 census Moga district has a population of 995,746, roughly equal to the nation of Fiji or the US state of Montana. This gives it a ranking of 447th in India (out of a total of 640). The district has a population density of 444 inhabitants per square kilometre (1,150/sq mi) . Its population growth rate over the decade 2001-2011 was 10.9%. Moga has a sex ratio of 893 females for every 1000 males, and a literacy rate of 71.6%. Scheduled Castes made up 36.50% of the population.

=== Gender ===
The table below shows the sex ratio of Moga district through decades.

Sex ratio of Moga district"
Census Year	1951	1961	1971	1981	1991	2001	2011
Sex Ratio	867	862	866	881	884	887	893

The table below shows the child sex ratio of children below the age of 6 years in the rural and urban areas of Moga district.

Child sex ratio of children below the age of 6 years in Moga district
Year	Urban	Rural
2011	853	863
2001	802	822

=== Languages ===
Languages of Moga district (First Language) (2011)
1. Punjabi (96.2%)
2. Hindi (3.21%)
3. Others (0.58%)

At the time of the 2011 census, 96.21% of the population spoke Punjabi and 3.21% Hindi as their first language.

=== Religion ===
Religion in Moga district (2011)
Religion	Percent
Sikhism	82.24%
Hinduism	15.91%
Islam	0.94%
Other or not stated	0.91%

The district has the second highest percentage of Sikhs by district in Punjab, after Taran Taran (according to 2001 census).

The table below shows the population of different religions in absolute numbers in the urban and rural areas of Moga district.

Absolute numbers of different religious groups in Moga district
Religion	Urban (2011)	Rural (2011)	Urban (2001)	Rural (2001)
Sikh	1,20,975	6,97,946	98,934	6,68,835
Hindu	1,00,170	58,244	76,916	40,870
Muslim	1,874	7,514	968	5,028
Christian	1,844	1,433	1,501	1,063
Other religions	2,383	3,363	321	420

== Economy ==
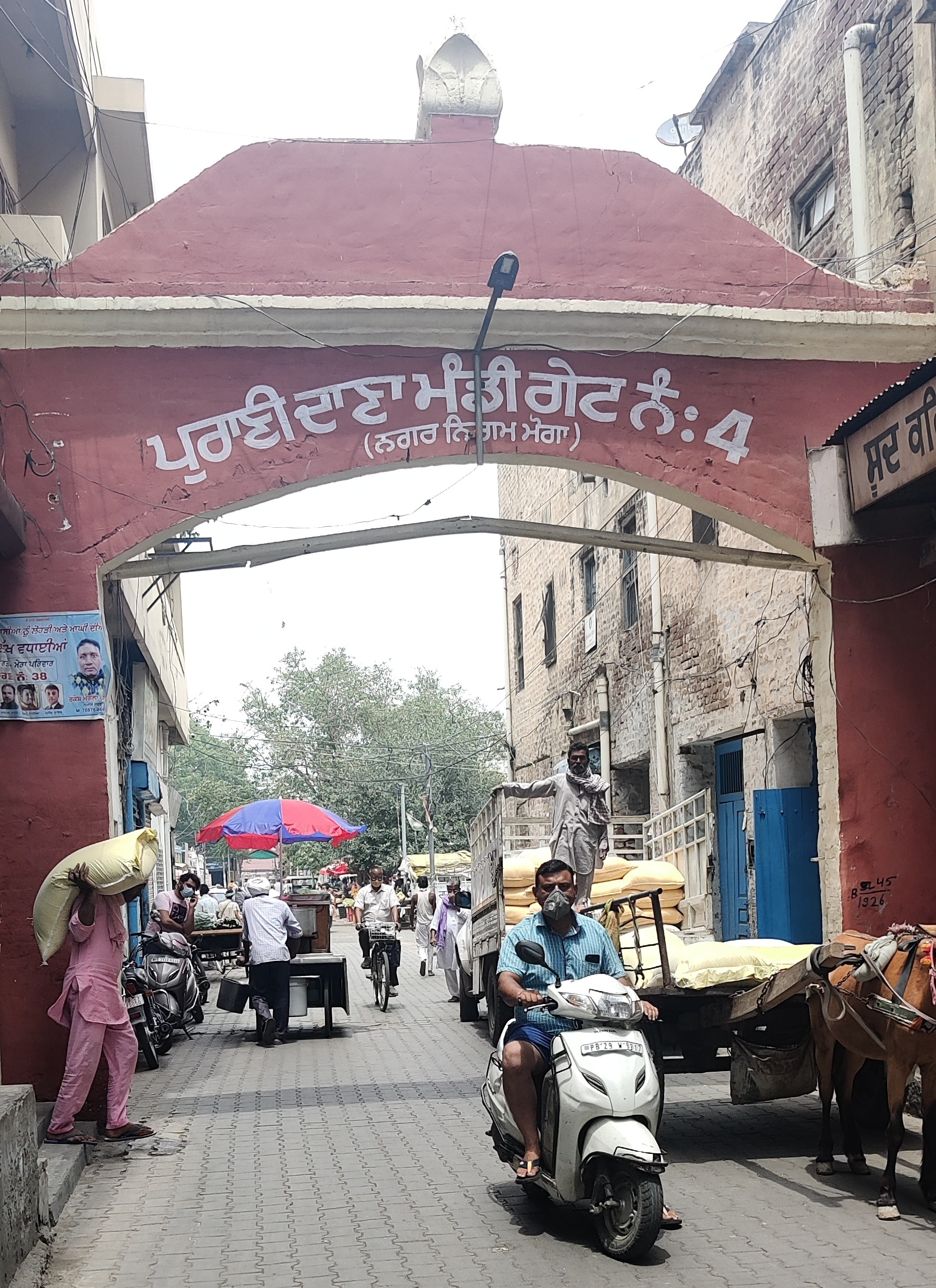
Old Grain Market in Moga, Punjab

The income of Municipalities and Municipal corporations in Moga district from municipal rates and taxes in the year 2018 was 577,781 thousand rupees. Much of the economic development of the district is attributed to the Nestlé factory, with an industrial cluster forming to support the dairy industry, consisting of competing dairy farms and factories. Nestlé purchases dairy from over 75,000 local farmers in the district, collecting twice a day from more than 650 village dairies. In 2012, the Nestlé factory directly employed around 2,400 people, with a further 86,371 people being provided employment through Nestlé's main suppliers.

=== Agriculture ===
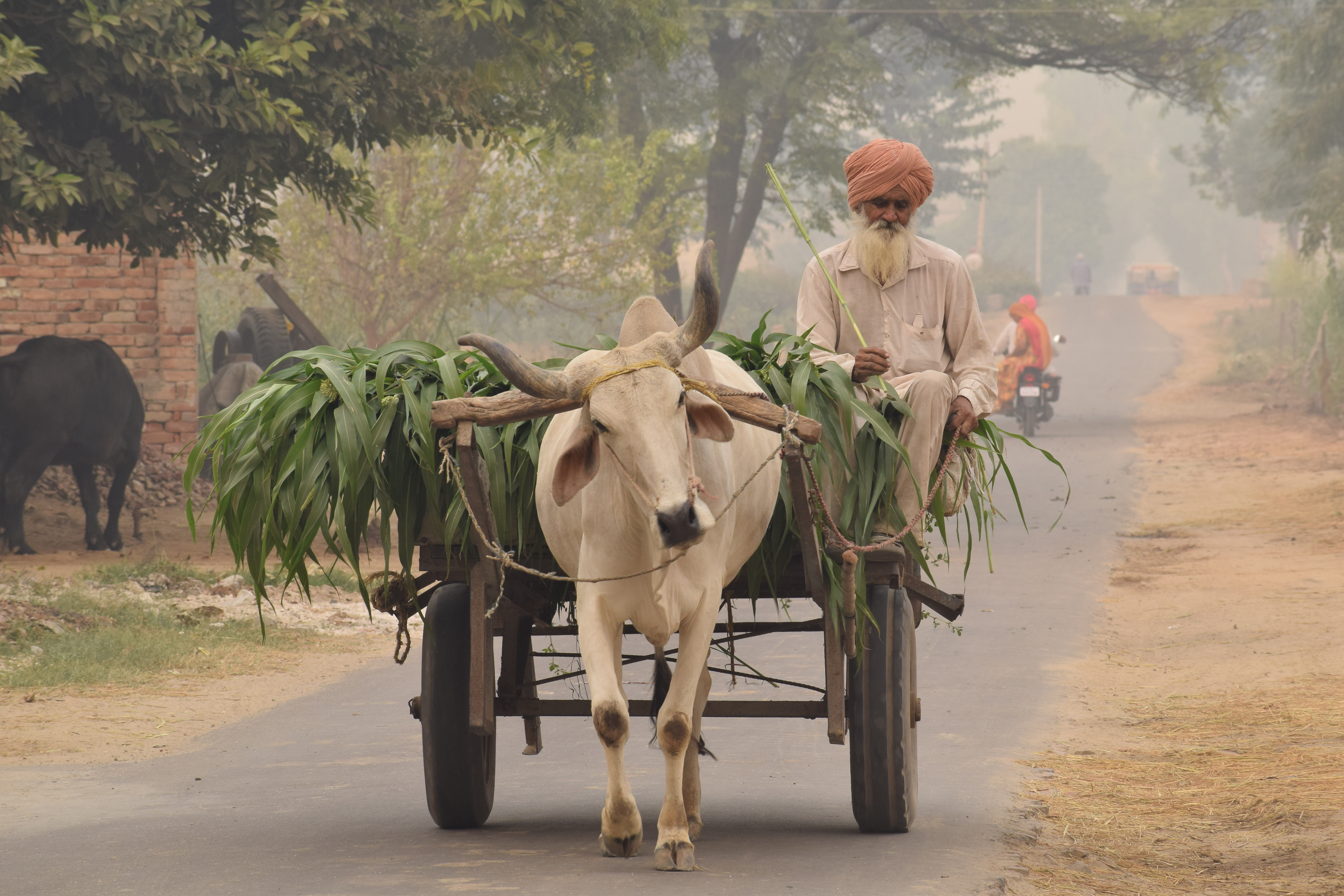
An old man taking grass on cart for cattle in Gholia Kalan village, Moga district, Punjab, India, 29 October 2017

The local economy of Moga is dominated by the agricultural sector, with 90% of the land of the district being considered agricultural land. The main staples of crop grown in Moga's farms are wheat, cumin, maize, barley, and millet. Cotton, oilseeds, and potatoes are also cultivated, to a lesser extent. The district exports much of the food-grains grown in it. The grain markets of Moga are prominent, where surplus stocks of wheat, rice, pulses, oil-seeds, and cotton, are on sale.

The main kind of livestock kept in Moga are cows, buffalos, bullocks, horses, mules, sheep, and goats. The district contains a cattle hospital.

=== Industry ===
Many factories in the state are for making agricultural-related products, nut-bolts, mustard-oil, engine-oil, coffee, condensed-milk, and footwear. The district contains a Nestlé factory. The Nestlé factory produces milk, milk-products, and maggi. A surge of foreign-exchange coming into the district is related to the exporting of products such as motor-parts, cotton-seeds, oil-seeds, and nuts to international markets, such as Russia, the United Kingdom, the United States, Malaysia, Thailand, Poland, and others.

In 2010-11, there were 2,850 registered Micro and Small Enterprise (MSE) units in Moga district, which provided employment to 21,218 people. There were 5 registered Medium and Large industrial units, which provided employment to 1,699 people.

== Politics ==
In 1952, before the delimitation exercise, Moga existed back then as Moga-Dharamkot constituency, which was represented by two candidates, Rattan Singh (Congress) and Devinder Singh (Akali Dal). Moga tends to vote against the general trend. In the last 14 elections that Moga assembly constituency had witnessed since 1952, the voters voted for the losing candidate at 12 elections. It was only twice that the winning candidate from here belonged to the ruling party, with those candidates namely being Malti Thapar (Congress) in 1992 and Tota Singh of the Shiromani Akali Dal (SAD) in 1997. Voters in the region do not generally vote based upon caste or religion. Of the last fourteen MLAs, nine were Sikhs, with the remaining being Hindus and one Jain: Sathi Rup Lal, Malti Thapar, and Joginderpal Jain. The secular nature of the voters in the region has been attributed to the numerous social and political movements that occurred in Moga over the years. On different occasions, the Akali Dal has launched their political campaigns from Moga before going for the assembly polls, such as in 1996, 2006, and 2011, before returning to power. Moga has been described as a key place in Punjabi politics. All three majors parties, SAD, Congress, and the AAP, place importance on starting their political rallies from Moga. In September 2016, the Aam Aadmi Party (AAP) released their manifesto at a political rally for farmers at Bagha Purana. For the 2027 election in Punjab, many political parties (including AAP, SAD, and BJP) began hosting rallies in Moga district.

=== List of MLAs per assembly constituency ===
No.	Constituency	Name of MLA	Party	Bench
71	Nihal Singh Wala (SC)	Manjit Singh Bilaspur	Aam Aadmi Party	Government
72	Bhagha Purana	Amritpal Singh Sukhanand	Aam Aadmi Party	Government
73	Moga	Dr. Amandeep Kaur Arora	Aam Aadmi Party	Government
74	Dharamkot	Devinder Singh Laddi Dhos	Aam Aadmi Party	Government

== Education ==
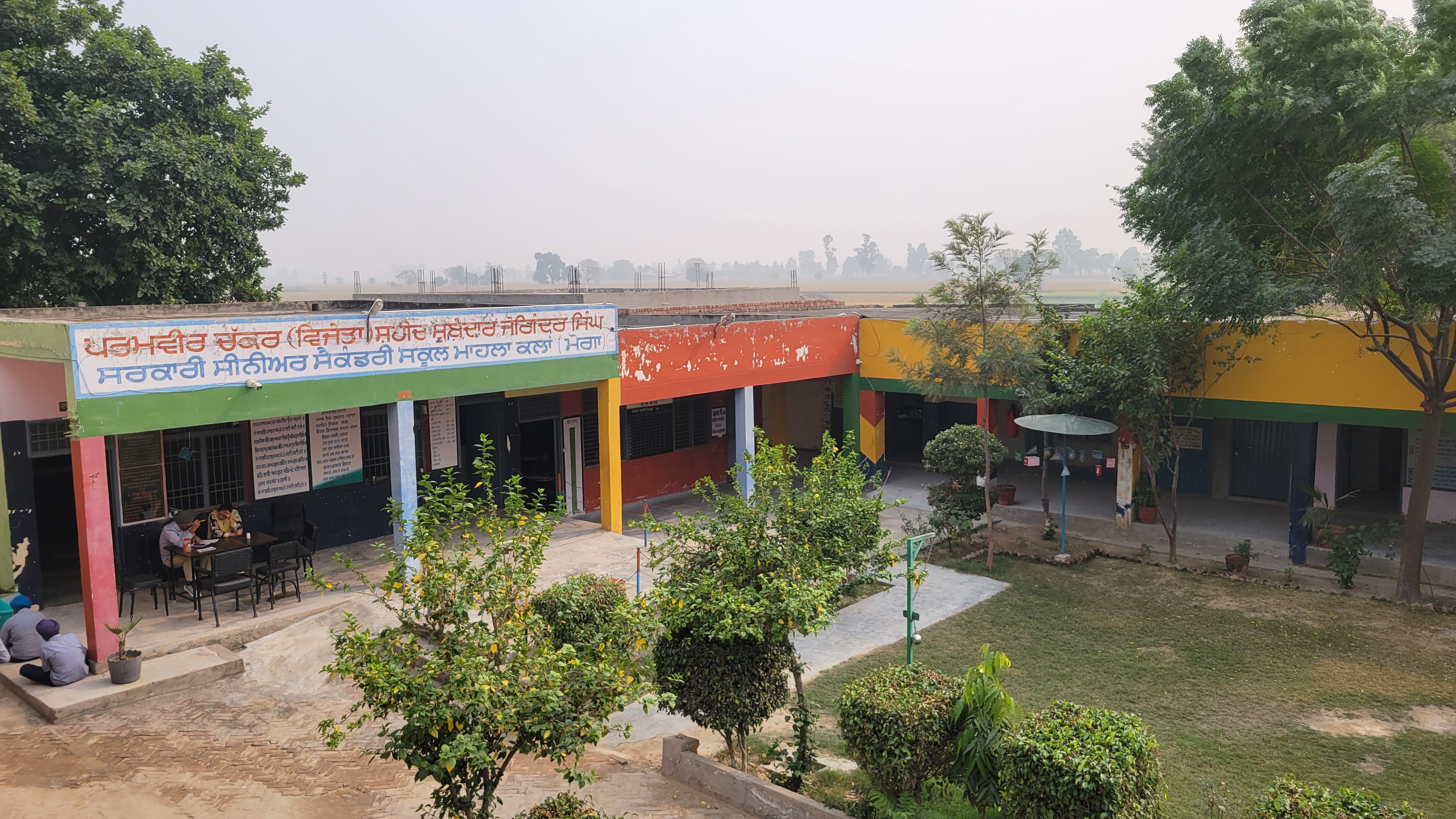
Government Senior Secondary School in Mahla Kalan village, Moga district, Punjab

Moga city is also known for its advanced number of educational institutes, such as middle, high, and senior secondary schools, colleges, and libraries. The district also contains Ayurvedic colleges. The district has two public libraries which contain reading-room facilities.

Notable schools and colleges of Moga include:

- Baba Kundan Singh Memorial Law College
- Kitchlu Public School

== Environment ==
According to a 2009–10 survey, around 32 sq km of the district is classified as state forest. Tree-species found in the district include: Shisham, Kikar, Mango, Tut, Jamun, Serin, Neem, Dak/Darek, Pipal, Eucalyptus, Beri, and Khajur. In water-logged areas, the following species can be found: Kana, Kahi, Arjun, Dale, and Battar.

The district currently has a low amount of its area under forest cover, partly due to past deforestation during the Green Revolution, but afforestation and reforestation drives have led to the planting of saplings in the district. 9 million tree saplings are planned to be planted in the district before 2026 by NITI Aayog to meet the demands of a World Economic Forum initiative, with hopes of increasing Moga district's percentage of land under forest cover from the current 1.25% (2,575 hectares) to over 5% (11, 575 hectares). In September 2021, a garden, named 'Guru Granth Sahib Bagh', was set up in the historical village of Patto Hira Singh in the district. The garden is notable as it contains flora species mentioned in the Guru Granth Sahib, the primary Sikh canonical scripture and is intended on highlighting the connection between the Sikh Gurus and the natural world.

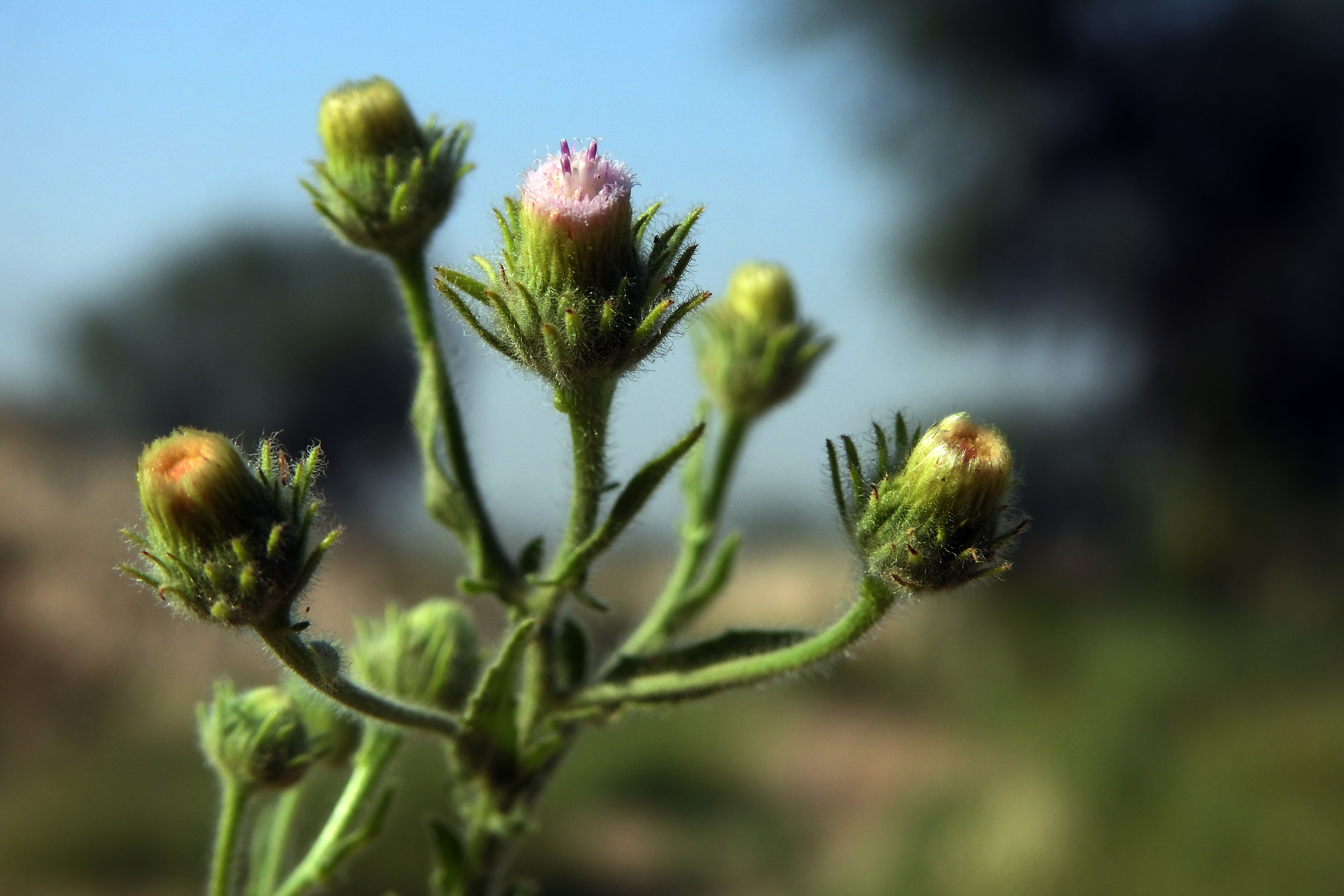
Blumea viscosa at Moga

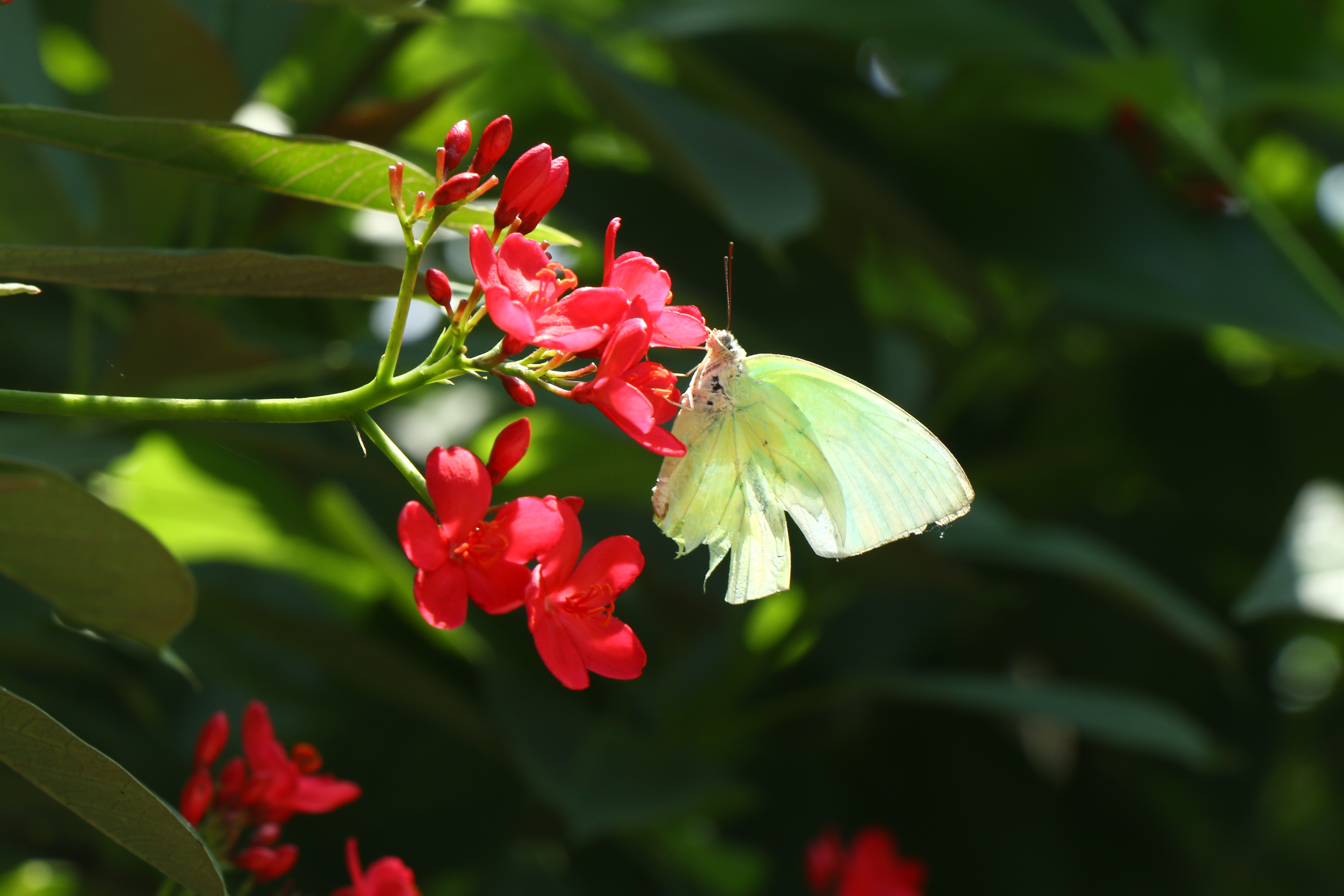
Butterfly sitting on a flower drinking nectar from Himmatpura village, Moga district

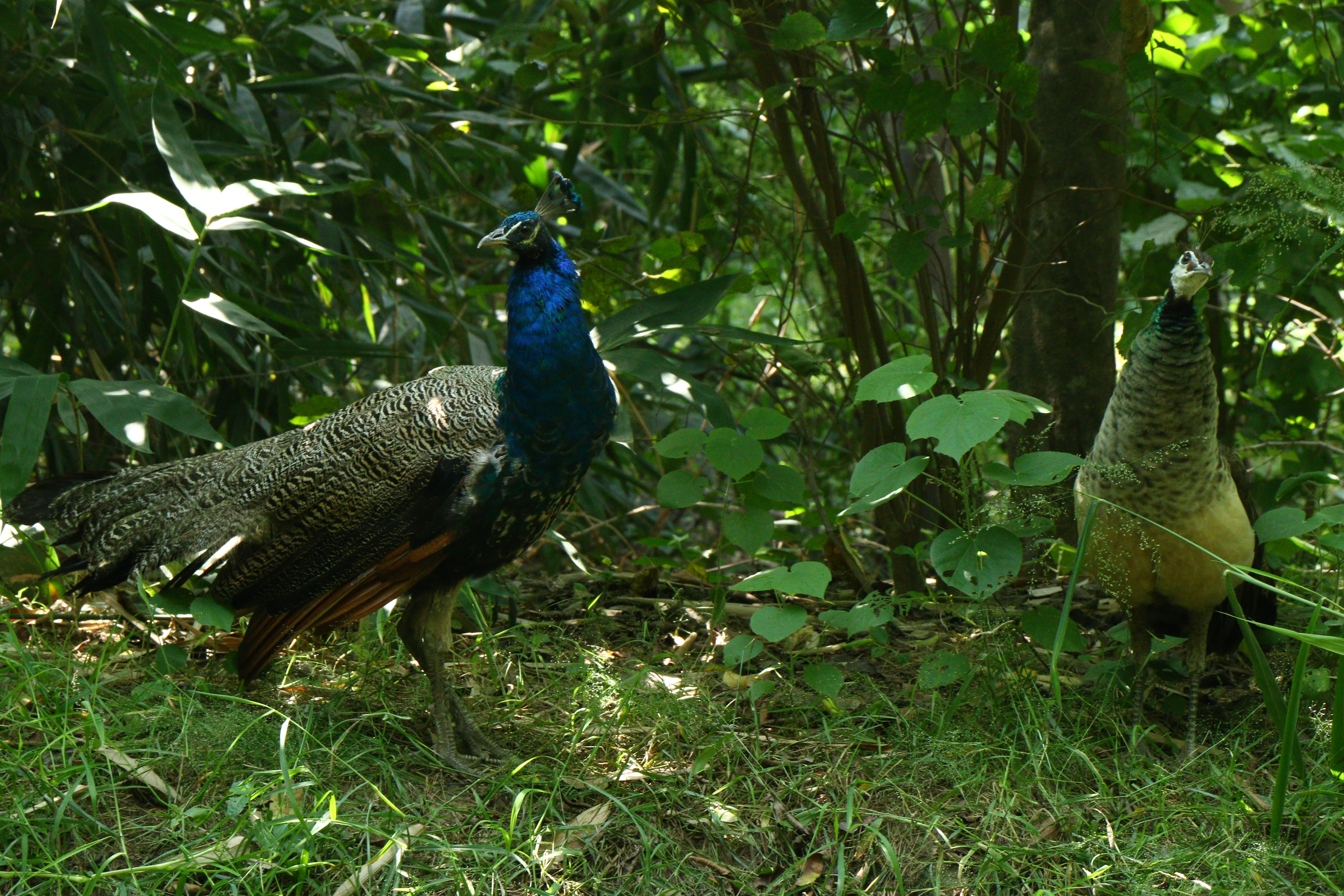
Peacocks in Himmatpura village, Moga district, Punjab, India, 6 September 2017

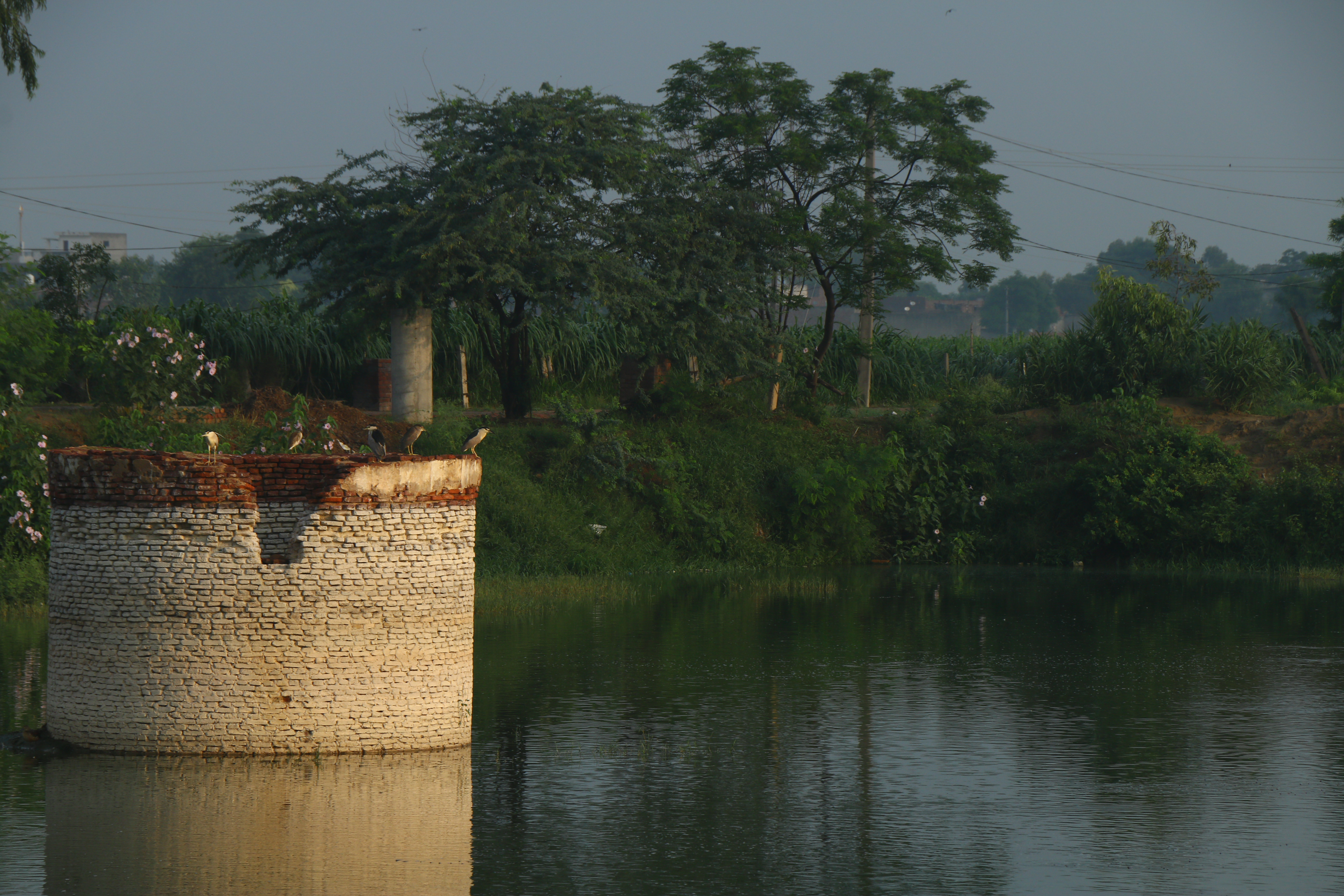
Photograph of birds sitting on an old well at Dhurkot village, Nihal Singh Wala tehsil, Moga district, Punjab, India, 5 September 2017

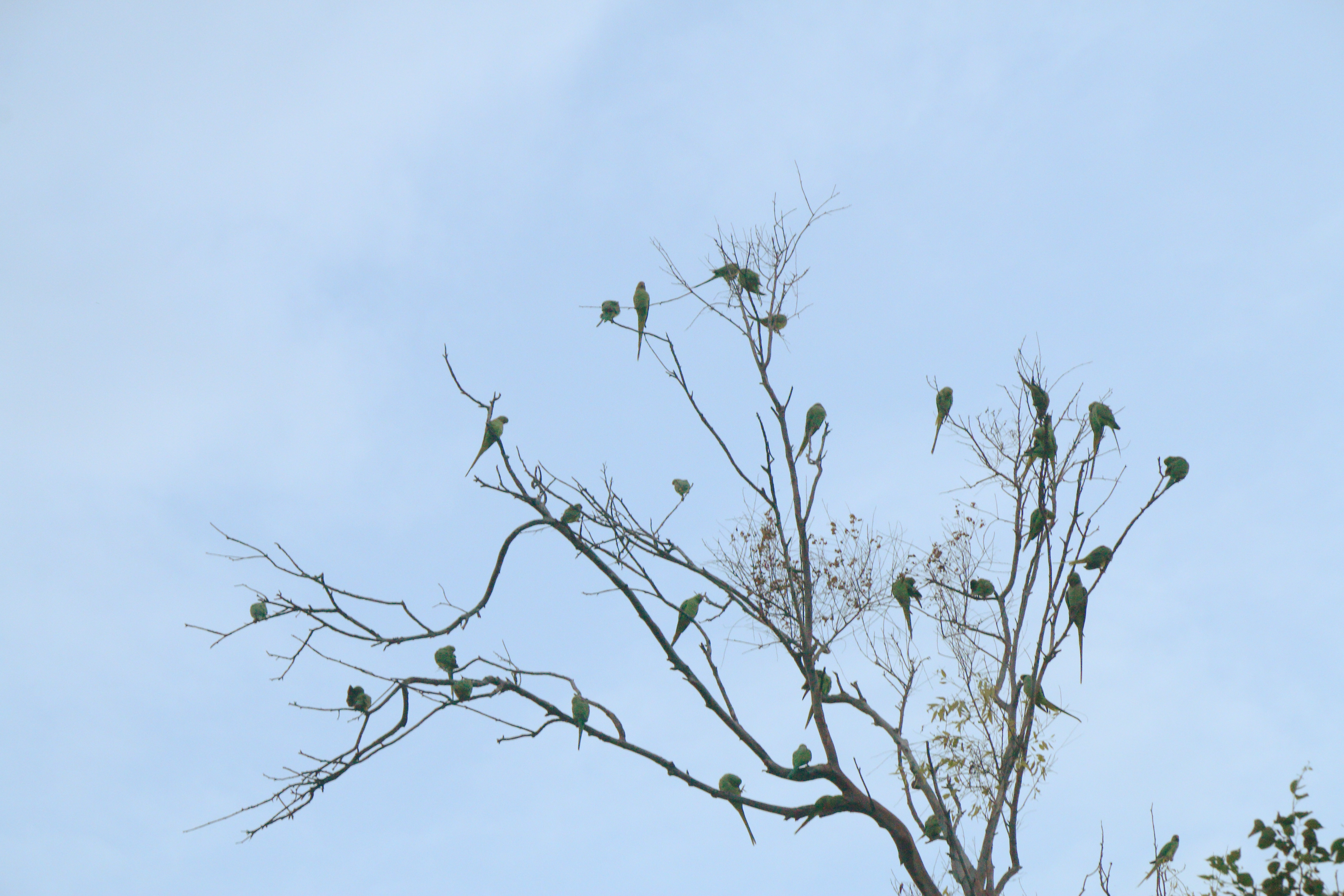
Parrots in a tree in Nihal Singh Wala, Moga district, Punjab, India

Video of a tube-well in Chugawan village, Moga tehsil, Moga district, Punjab, India, 19 April 2023

In 2025, the region experienced flooding due to heavy rains, causing an overflow of the Sutlej. In November 2025, the district administration banned all heavy-equipment from operating within 500 metres of the bank of the Sutlej to prevent illegal sand-mining due to abuse of the Jisda Khet Usdi Ret scheme meant to help agriculturalists recover from the earlier flooding. The ban was in-place until 31 December 2025. The district was implementing new methods, such as modern farming equipment and storage facilities for stubble bales, to reduce stubble-burning occurrences. The district had the lowest water-table out of all the districts of central Punjab in 2003, with 40% of its groundwater reserves being between 70–130 ft and 60% being > 130 ft. Furthermore, tubewell depth increased from 140 ft to 240 ft, with fit water samples declining from 51% in 1991 to 28% in 2004. The water-table has been decreasing ever since the Green Revolution that began in the 1960's, with factors such as changes in land-use patterns, irrigation, shifting cropping pattern, and early rice transplantation. The district lies in the central Punjab agro-climatic region, which receives on-average 650 ml of rainfall annually.

== Health ==
Many ayurvedic and allopathic health facilities, such as dispensaries and hospitals, can be found in the district. There are also regular hospitals and family-planning centres.

The table below shows the data from the district nutrition profile of children below the age of 5 years, in Moga, as of year 2020.

District nutrition profile of children under 5 years of age in Moga, year 2020
Indicators	Number of children (<5 years)	Percentage
Stunted	16,207	22%
Wasted	8,818	12%
Severely wasted	2,245	3%
Underweight	12,365	17%
Overweight/obesity	3,606	5%
Anemia	46,467	70%
Total children	73,602	

The table below shows the district nutrition profile of Moga of women between the ages of 15 and 49 years, as of year 2020.

District nutritional profile of Moga of women of 15–49 years, in 2020
Indicators	Number of women (15–49 years)	Percentage
Underweight (BMI <18.5 kg/m^2)	41,329	13%
Overweight/obesity	101,378	33%
Hypertension	95,952	31%
Diabetes	45,699	15%
Anemia (non-preg)	168,240	55%
Total women (preg)	15,808	
Total women	307,737	

The table below shows the current use of family planning methods by currently married women between the age of 15 and 49 years, in Moga district.

Family planning methods used by women between the ages of 15 and 49 years, in Moga district
Method	Total (2019–21)	Total (2015–16)	Rural (2015–16)
Female sterilization	25.6%	37.5%	38.9%
Male sterilization	0.6%	0.2%	0.2%
IUD/PPIUD	3.2%	5.6%	4.8%
Pill	1.9%	2.6%	2.2%
Condom	28.2%	21.1%	20.0%
Injectables	0.0%	0.6%	--
Any modern method	60.0%	67.4%	66.4%
Any method	75.0%	76.6%	74.2%
Total unmet need	8.0%	6.4%	7.4%
Unmet need for spacing	2.7%	2.2%	2.7%

The table below shows the number of road accidents and people affected in Moga district by year.

Road accidents and people affected in Moga district by year
Year	Accidents	Killed	Injured	Vehicles Involved
2022	220	201	64	158
2021	193	185	95	181
2020	185	173	70	142
2019	135	110	92	145

== Deputy Commissioners ==
Moga district have following Deputy Commissioners so far:

#	Name	Assumed office	Left office	Tenure
1	Phulwant Singh Sidhu	5 December 1995	4 December 1996	365 days
2	Cap. Narinder Singh	4 December 1996	18 February 1997	76 days
3	R Venkatraman	18 February 1997	28 April 1998	1 year, 69 days
4	K.S. Kang	28 April 1998	3 June 1999	1 year, 36 days
5	K.B.S Sidhu	3 June 1999	4 March 2002	2 years, 274 days
6	G. Raman Kumar	4 March 2002	25 July 2004	2 years, 143 days
7	Mandeep Singh	26 July 2004	6 April 2006	1 year, 254 days
8	V.K. Meena	7 April 2006	9 October 2006	185 days
9	Arvinder Singh	9 October 2006	23 December 2006	75 days
10	S.K. Sharma	23 December 2006	12 March 2007	365 days
11	Arvinder Singh	12 March 2007	6 November 2007	239 days
12	Satwant Singh	7 November 2007	11 August 2010	2 years, 277 days
13	Vijay N. Zade	11 August 2010	28 July 2011	351 days
14	Ashok Kumar Singla	28 July 2011	28 December 2011	153 days
15	B. Purushertha	28 December 2011	3 April 2012	97 days
16	Arshdeep Singh Thind	3 April 2012	30 May 2014	2 years, 57 days
17	Parminder Singh Gill	2 June 2014	5 January 2016	1 year, 217 days
18	Kuldeep Singh Vaid	3 February 2016	30 November 2016	301 days
19	Parminder Singh Gill	9 December 2016	5 January 2017	27 days
20	Parveen Kumar Thind	6 January 2017	15 May 2017	129 days
21	Dilraj Singh	16 May 2017	29 August 2018	1 year, 105 days
22	Devinderpal Singh Kharbanda	29 August 2018	2 October 2018	34 days
23	Sandeep Hans	3 October 2018	5 October 2021	3 years, 2 days
24	Dr. Harish Nayar	5 October 2021	1 April 2022	178 days
25	Kulwant Singh	3 April 2022	16 August 2024	2 years, 135 days
26	Vishesh Sarangal	17 August 2024	Till Date	2 years, 95 days

== Land and genealogical records ==
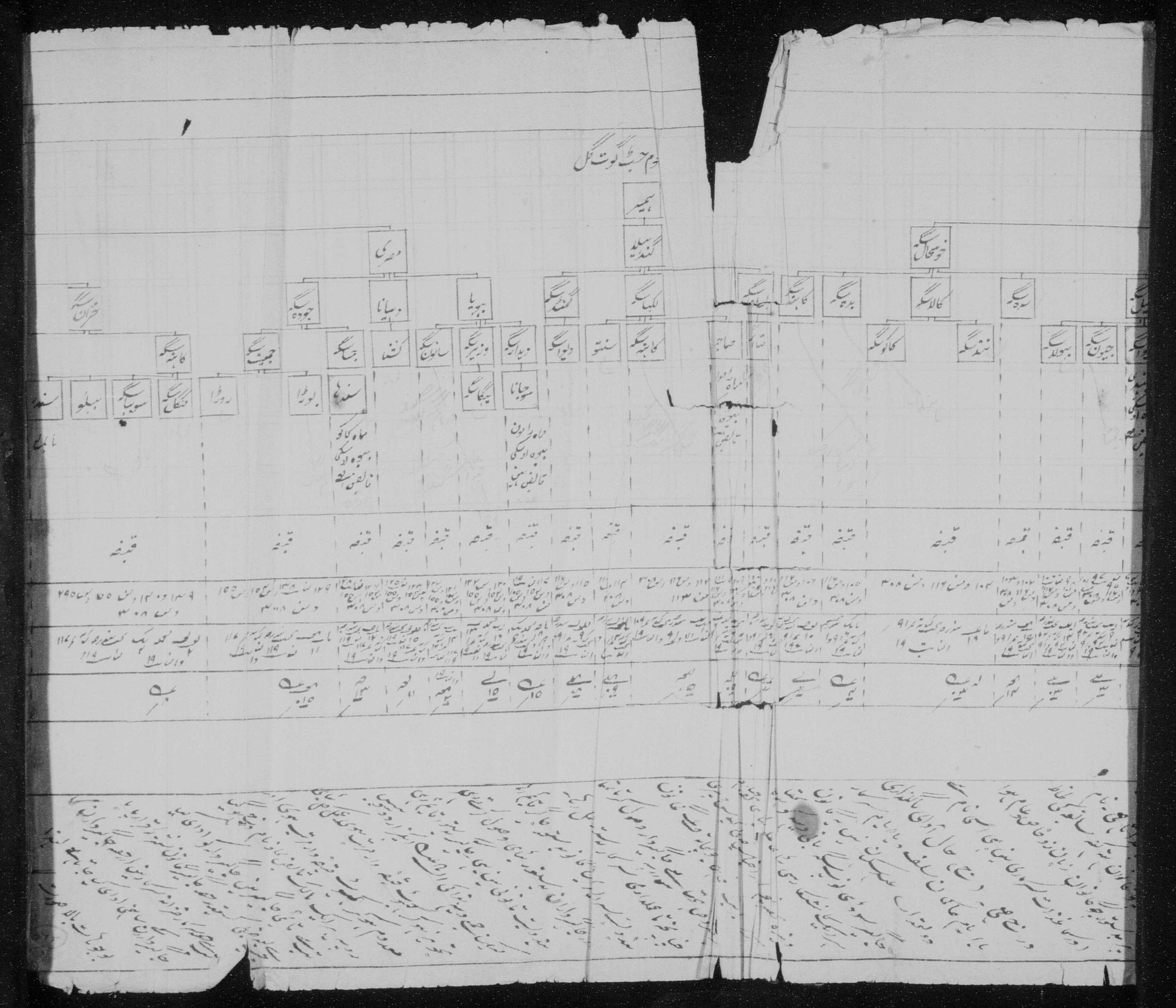
Example of a genealogical pedigree (family-tree) of a landowning family of Chugawan village in Moga district (formerly part of Ferozepore district), Punjab, 1887–1888

Shajjra Nasb (also known as Kursee Nama (Note: Also spelt as 'Shajra Nasab'. Kursee Nama is also spelt as 'Kurseenama' or 'Kursinama'.)) records of villages of Moga district from 1887–1958 have been digitized by the Church of Jesus Christ of Latter-day Saints via FamilySearch and are available for online viewing. These records detail land ownership pedigrees for families of the village. The genealogical importance of such records for the purpose of family history research was raised by Gurcharan Singh Gill of Moga. Gill discovered in 1986 that tax-records in the district were attached to a genealogical pedigree going back four generations, with records dating back to the 1850's. These records have been described as being one of the few surviving records of Punjabi genealogy, as census records in India were rarely preserved. The more recent records were written in Punjabi using Gurmukhi script and the older records were written in Urdu in Nastaliq script. The names of more than 250,000 individuals have been extracted from the records by Gill.

== Notable people ==
- Jarnail Singh Bhindranwale, 14th head of the Sikh institution Damdami Taksal from village Rode
- Raj Brar, an Indian singer.
- Gurjant Singh Budhsinghwala, militant leader of the Khalistan Liberation Force which sought the freedom of Punjab through the use of arms
- Khem Singh Gill, an academic, geneticist, plant breeder and Vice-Chancellor of the Punjab Agricultural University, and receiver of Padma Bhushan award
- Lachhman Singh Gill, Chief Minister of Punjab from village Chuhar Chak
- Jaswant Singh Kanwal, Sahitya academic fellowship for the book 'Pakhi' 1996 and Sahitya Akademi award for 'Taushali Di Hanso' 1998. He was from Dhudike vill.
- Narinder Singh Kapany, Indian born American Physicist known for his work in fiber optics
- Harmanpreet Kaur, batter in the Indian Women's National Cricket Team and Captain of the T20 Indian Women's National Cricket Team
- Roshan Prince, actor and Singer
- Lala Lajpat Rai, an Indian freedom fighter from Village Dhudhike
- Baldev Singh, author, winner of the Sahitya Akademi Award
- Gurinder Singh, Fifth and Present Chief of Radha Soami Satsang Beas
- Joginder Singh, was an Indian Army soldier, and recipient of the Param Vir Chakra.
- Tota Singh former Punjab Education Minister and former Agriculture Minister
- Sonu Sood, Indian film actor
- Tajinderpal Singh Toor, a shot put athlete and Asian Games gold medalist
- Fazal Deen, Battery Hawker.

== See also ==
- Moga Municipal Corporation
- Maddoke
- Singhanwala
