= Khalra =

Khalra, Punjab
- Village
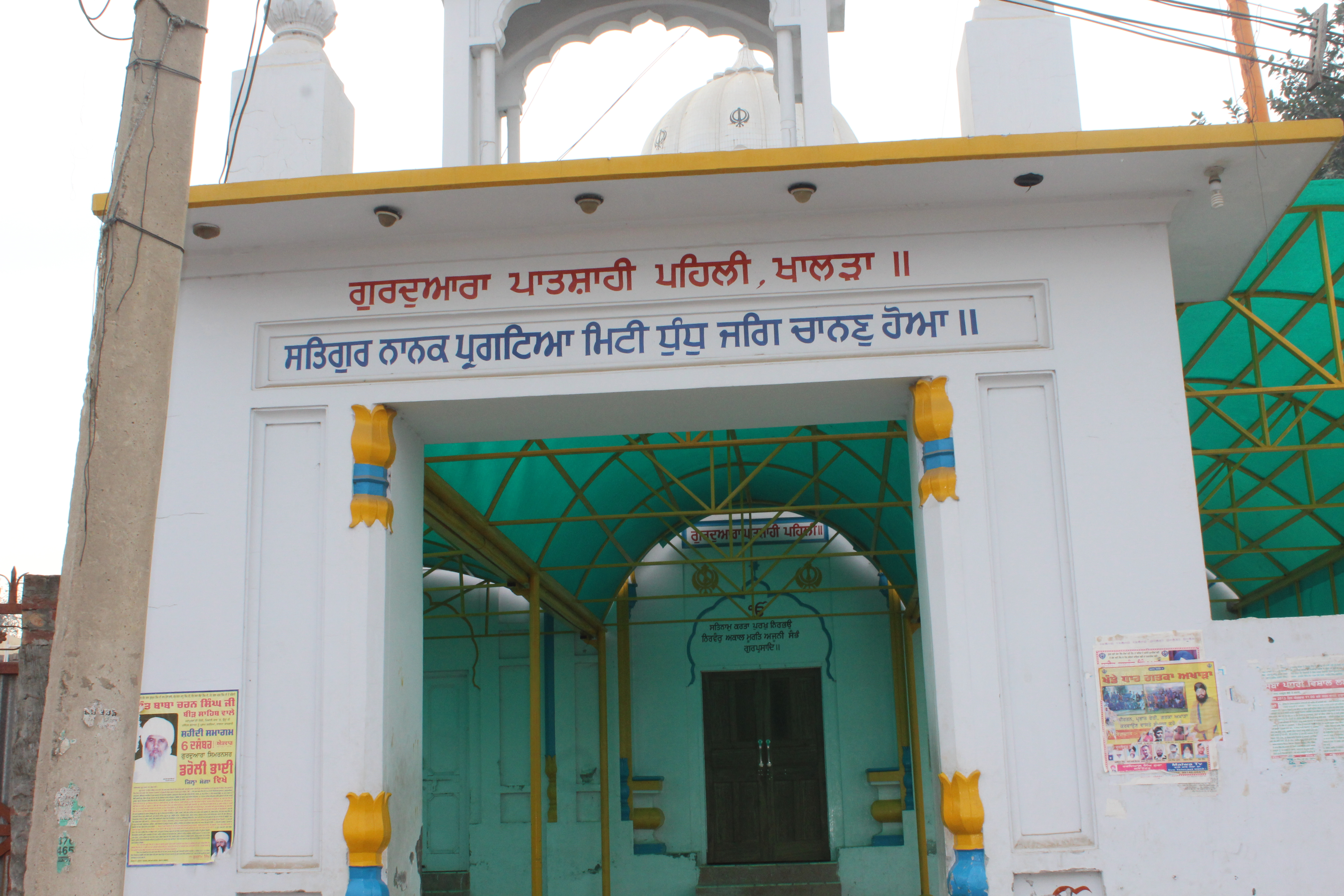
- Gurudwara Shri Pehli patshahi sahib, khalra

- Location in Punjab, India Khalra, Punjab (India)
- Coordinates: 31.395875°N 74.621472°E
- Country: India
- State: Punjab
- District: Tarn Taran
- Founder: Guru Nanak

Government
  - Type: Local Government
  - Body: State Government of Punjab, Government of India
- Elevation: 214 m (702 ft)

Population (2011)
  - Total: 5,831

Languages
  - Principal: Punjabi, Hindi
- Time zone: UTC+5:30 (IST)
- PIN: 143305
- Telephone code: 01852
- Vehicle registration: PB- 29

Khalra village is located in Patti Tehsil of Tarn Taran district in Punjab, India. It is situated 27 km away from sub-district headquarter Patti and 35 km away from district headquarter Tarn Taran. According to Census 2011 information the village code of Khalra village is 038051.

The total geographical area of village is 629 hectares. Khalra has a total population of 5,831 peoples. There are about 1,053 houses in Khalra village. Patti is nearest town to Khalra.

== Gurudwara Shri Patshahi Pehli Sahib ==
Gurudwara Shri Patshahi Pehli Sahib is situated in village khalra. GURU NANAK sahib visited this place. GURU SAHIB came here after teaching the farmers of Patti. GURU SAHIB preached sangat the way of life and did gurbani kirtan and established a Dharmsala here.

== Location ==
Khalra is 3.4 km (2.1 mi) from the India-Pakistan border on the west end of National Highway 703B (earlier designated as State Highway 19) in the state of Punjab, India.

== Notable people ==
- Jaswant Singh Khalra, human rights activist

== Nearby cities and towns ==
- Bhikhiwind
- Patti
- Harike
- Amritsar
- Tarn Taran
