= Harike Wetland =

Largest wetland in northern India

Harike Wetland and Harike Lake
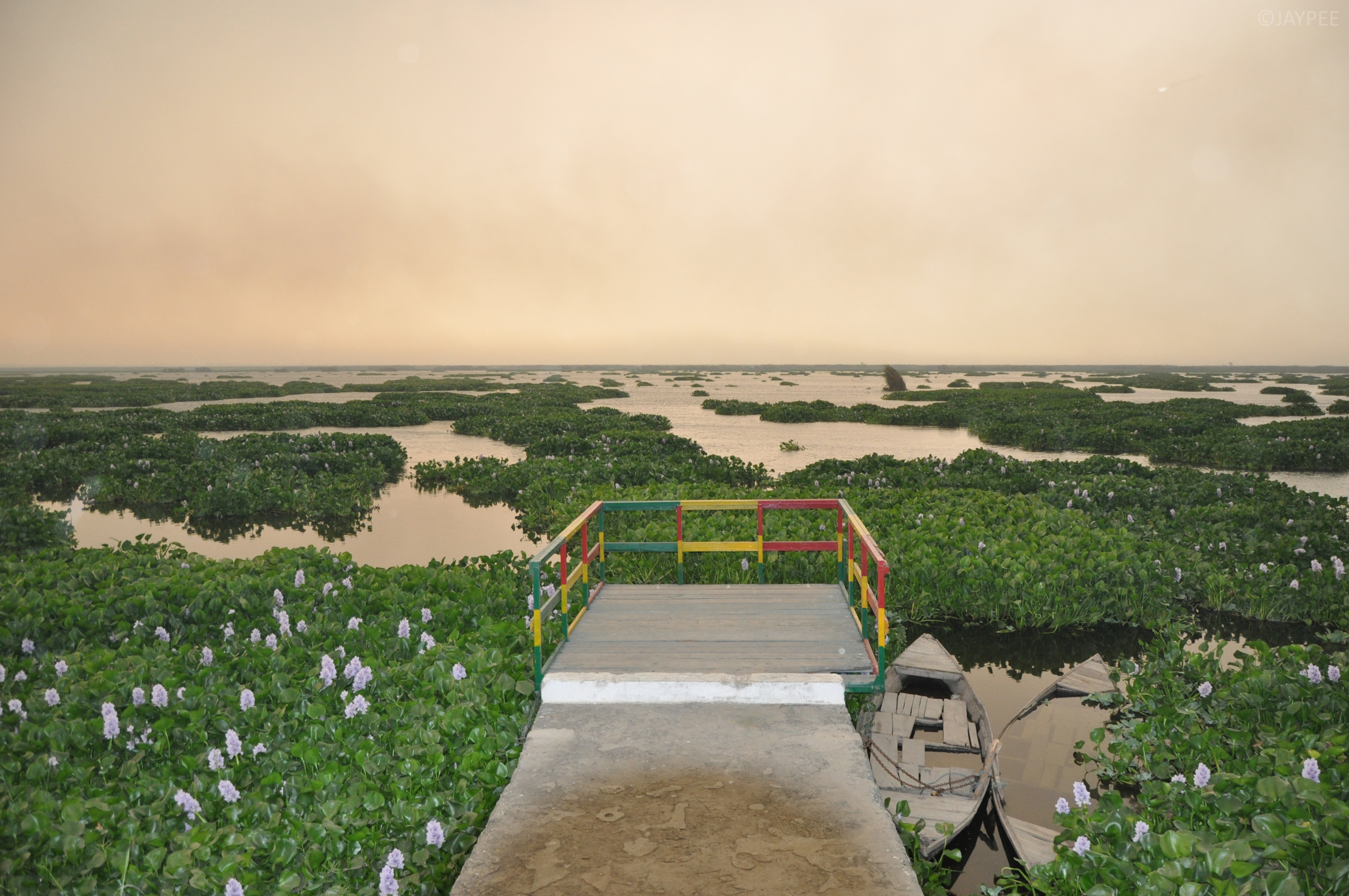
- Harike

- Location within Punjab Location within India
- Location: Punjab
- Coordinates: 31.15°N 74.97°E
- Type: Freshwater
- Primary inflows: Beas and Satluj Rivers
- Basin countries: India
- Surface area: 4,100 hectares (10,000 acres)
- Max. depth: 2 metres (6 ft 7 in)
- Surface elevation: 210 metres (690 ft)
- Islands: Thirty three islands
- Settlements: Harike

Ramsar Wetland
- Official name: Harike Lake
- Designated: 23 March 1990
- Reference no.: 462

Harike Wetland, with the Harike Lake in the deeper part of it, east of the Harike village also known as "Hari-ke-Pattan" (Port of Harike), is a Ramsar site and the largest wetland in northern India on the border of Tarn Taran Sahib district and Ferozepur district of the Punjab state in India created by the Harike Barrage headworks immediate downstream of the confluence of Beas and Sutlej rivers. Harike village is accessible by the NH-54 (Taran Taran 35 km north), NH-703A (Firozepur 45 km southwest and Kapurthala 60 km northeast), and NH-703B (Bhikhiwind 30 km northwest and Moga 50 km southeast).

Harike Barrage has created the man-made Harike Wetland. The Monsoon climate dominates the catchment draining into the wetland. The Harike headworks, which form the Harike lake and the enlarged wetland, was constructed for irrigation and drinking water supplies, through the Ferozepur, Indira Gandhi Canal and Makku feeder canals with total carrying capacity of 29,000 cubic feet per second (820 m^{3}/s), to supply to the command areas located in the states of Punjab and Rajasthan. The lake is triangular, with its apex in the west, bounded by a bund called the Dhussi Bund forming one side, a canal in the second and a major road on the third. The periphery of the lake is surrounded by agricultural land and the wetland is reported to be rich in ground water resources.

The rich biodiversity of the wetland which plays a vital role in maintaining the precious hydrological balance in the catchment with its vast concentration of migratory fauna of waterfowls including a number of globally threatened species (stated to be next only to the Keoladeo National Park near Bharatpur) has been responsible for the recognition accorded to this wetland in 1990, by the Ramsar Convention, as one of the Ramasar sites in India, for conservation, development and preservation of the ecosystem.

== Geography ==
This man-made riverine lacustrine wetland spreads into the three districts of Tarn Taran Sahib, Ferozepur and Kapurthala in Punjab and covers an area of 4100 ha. Conservation of this wetland has been given due importance, since 1987–88, both by the Ministry of Environment and Forests, Government of India and the Punjab State Government (through its several agencies), and over the years several studies and management programmes have been implemented.

The nearest town to the wetland is Makhu, which connects to Ferozpur, Faridkot and Bhatinda. Ferozepur) Railway Station and Bus Stand is situated 10 km south of the Harike town.

== Ecology ==
The rich biodiversity of the wetland, with several species of birds, turtles, snakes, amphibians, fishes and invertebrates, is reportedly unique.

=== Flora ===
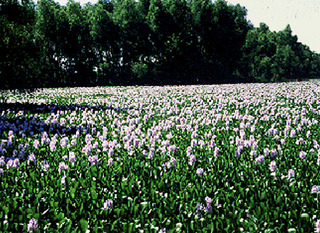
Water hyacinth in the wetland.

The wetland's rich floating Aquatic plants comprise the following:

- Eichhornia crassipes dominates in 50% of the area.
- Azolla sp. are sparsely seen in open water areas.
- Nelumbo nucifera, the lotus, is the prominent rooted floating vegetation.
- Ipomoea aquatica, is at the lake periphery in the shallower regions.
- Najas, Hydrilla, Ceratophyllum, Potamogeton, Vallisneria (eelgrass, tape grass vallis) and Charales are the species of submerged vegetation
- Typha sp. str the dominant emergent marsh vegetation.
- Tiny floating islets are formed by Eichhornia crassipes and other grass species in the mud and root zone all over the wetland.

=== Fauna ===
Endangered turtles and smooth-coated otters, listed in the IUCN Red List of Threatened Animals, aqua fauna are found in the wetland.

26 species of fish are recorded which include rohu, catla, Puntius, Cirrhina, Channa, Mystus, Chitala chitala, Cyprinus, and Ambassis ranga.

Invertebrates recorded are: molluscs (39 & 4 taxa), insects (6 & 32 taxa), crustaceans (27 taxa), annelids (7 taxa), nematodes (7 & 4 taxa), rotifers (59 & 13 taxa), and protozoans (5 & 21 taxa).

==== Bird sanctuary ====
The wetland was declared a bird sanctuary in 1982 and named as Harike Pattan Bird Sanctuary with an extended area of 8600 ha. Bombay Natural History Society (BNHS) carried out research and a bird ringing programme during the period 1980–85. An ornithological field laboratory was proposed to be established by BNHS.

200 species of birds visit the wetland during winter season of which some of the well known species (some are pictured in the gallery) are the cotton pygmy goose (Nettapus coromandelianus), tufted duck (Aythya fuligula), yellow-crowned woodpecker (Dendrocopos mahrattensis), yellow-eyed pigeon (Columba eversmanni), water cock (Gallicrex cinerea), Pallas's gull (Ichthyaetus ichthyaetus), brown-headed gull (Chroicocephalus brunnicephalus), black-headed gull (Chroicocephalus ridibundus), yellow-footed gull (Larus michahellis), Indian skimmer (Rynchops albicollis), white-winged tern (Chlidonias leucopterus), white-rumped vulture (Gyps bengalensis), hen harrier (Circus cyaneus), Eurasian tree sparrow (Passer montanus), hawk (subfamily Accipitrinae), Eurasian hobby (Falco subbuteo), horned grebe (Podiceps auritus), black-necked grebe (Podiceps nigricollis), great crested grebe (Podiceps cristatus), white-browed fantail (Rhipidura aureola), brown shrike (Lanius cristatus), common woodshrike (Tephrodornis pondicerianus), white-tailed stonechat (Saxicola leucurus), white-crowned penduline tit (Remiz coronatus), rufous-vented grass babbler (Laticilla burnesii), striated grassbird (Megalurus palustris), Cetti's warbler (Cettia cetti), sulphur-bellied warbler (Phylloscopus griseolus) and diving duck.

==== Indus dolphins ====
Comparative size of the river dolphin.

The Indus freshwater dolphin (Platanista minor minor), aquatic mammal classified as an endangered species in the Red Data Book of the International Union for the Conservation of Nature and Natural Resources, thought to have become extinct in India after 1930, but largely found in the Indus River system in Pakistan, was sighted in the Beas River in Harike wetland area on the morning of 14 December 2007 when Basanta Rajkumar, an Indian Forest Service (IFS) officer in charge of the area, was touring the area on a motorboat. Freshwater dolphin conservationist of the World Wildlife Fund (WWF) India team, who were called in to help in surveying the area after the discovery, also sighted a family of half a dozen dolphins at two different places along the 25-km stretch upstream of the Beas. Wildlife Institute of India (WII), an authority on freshwater dolphins with the endangered species management wing, also confirmed this finding. Discovering it in 2007, which was declared by the United Nations as Dolphin Year, was considered a special event. In the same Beas River, about 140 km downstream of the Harike Barrage in Pakistan territory, Indus dolphins are commonly found.

==== Gharials ====
The gharial (Gavialis gangeticus) was once found in great numbers in the Indus River system before its population dwindled and it is now classified as critically endangered in the International Union for Conservation of Nature's (IUCN) Red List of Endangered Species. The Punjab Government is now planning to release 10 gharials in the Harike Wetlands as the first step to increase their numbers and to attract more tourists.

== Issues ==
A remote sensing study of the Wetland area coupled with the analysis of rainfall, discharge and ground water level showed that the flow pattern had diminished and the size of wetland area had reduced by about 30%, over a 13 years study period.

=== Encroachment ===
Encroachments on the wetland habitat for intensive agriculture with resultant effluents of agricultural chemicals and also controversial encroachments.

=== Discharge of untreated affluent ===
Effluent discharge of untreated waste from towns and villages from industrial, urban and agricultural activities into the rivers which feed the wetland resulting in extensive weed growth (water hyacinth) in the wetland (polluted water discharged was reported to be about 700 million liters per day.

=== Wetland degradation ===
The wetland, which has existed since 1953, underwent changes over the years because of several factors, some of which had reached such a stage that environmentalists estimated the lifespan of the wetland to be decreasing due to the utilization of surface and ground waters for irrigation, regrowth of water hyacinth, soil erosion and siltation due to deforestation of the fragile lower Shivalik hills which form the catchment of the wetland, illegal fishing and poaching in violation of the Wildlife (Protection) Act, and indiscriminate grazing in the catchments resulting in damage to the wetland ecology.

== Conservation ==
=== Restoration measures ===
The gravity of the degraded status of the wetland has been addressed for implementing several restoration measures by a plethora of organizations/agencies/research institutions of the central and state governments and also the Indian Army Units located in the area. The measures undertaken to conserve the wetland have covered the following actions.

The Chief Minister of the State of Punjab instituted, in 1998, the Harike Wetland Conservation Mission to prepare a Master Plan for the integrated conservation and development of the Harike wetland, undertake specific projects and programmes for the conservation, regulate, screen and monitor all development activities, and evaluate all plans and proposals of all departments of the Government which concern the future of Harike.

Consequently, the Punjab State Council for Science and Technology evolved a management plan which involved, opening of sluice gates during monsoon for flushing the sedimentation, monitoring of water quality migration period, fencing some of the selected portions from encroachment, afforestation of the catchment area, soil conservation, education and public awareness, survey mapping & notification.

The menace of water hyacinth was addressed by the Indian Army (Western Command, Vajra Corps.) in the year 2000, in a joint effort initiated by the Chief Minister of the State. Under the pilot project named "Sahyog" the Army adopted several innovative mechanical system of weed removal.

=== Reforestation ===
Dalbergia sissoo, Acacia nilotica, Zizyphus sp., Ficus sp., alien Prosopis juliflora in large clumps and other trees are planted along the embankment. The State Wildlife Department has constructed earthen mounds in the marsh area with trees planted on it to increase nesting sites for the birds.

=== Water quality ===
The Punjab State Council for Science & Technology has reported that the water quality of the lake is mostly of 'A' Class as per the designated best use criteria even though large volumes of polluted water discharge into the wetland from industries and urban centres.

=== World wetlands day ===
On 2 February 2003 the World Wetlands Day was celebrated at Harike with the watchword "No-wetlands-No Water", which also marked the "International Year of Freshwater".

== Gallery ==
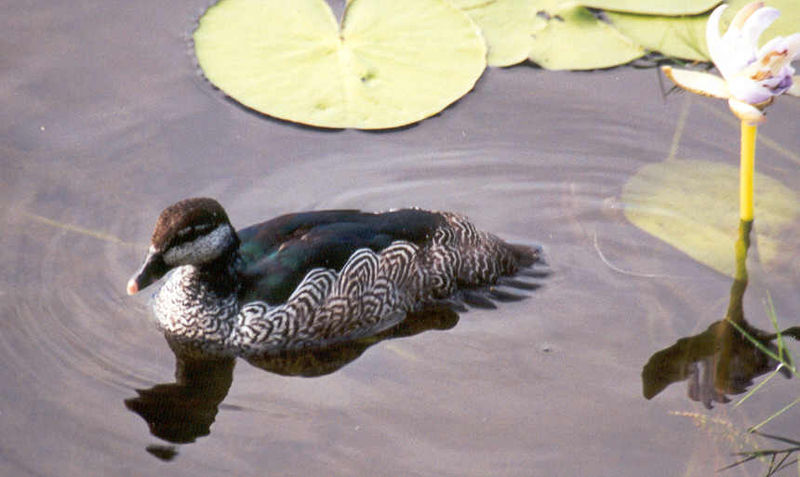
Pygmy goose

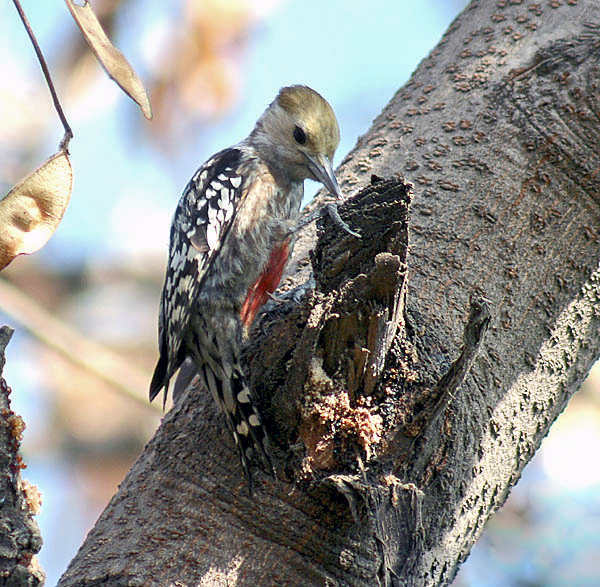
Yellow-crowned woodpecker

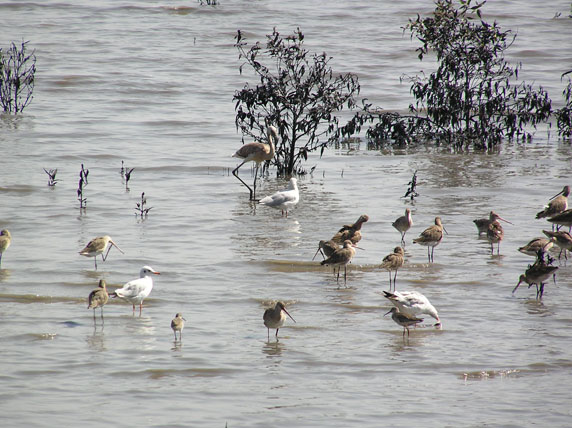
Brown-headed gull

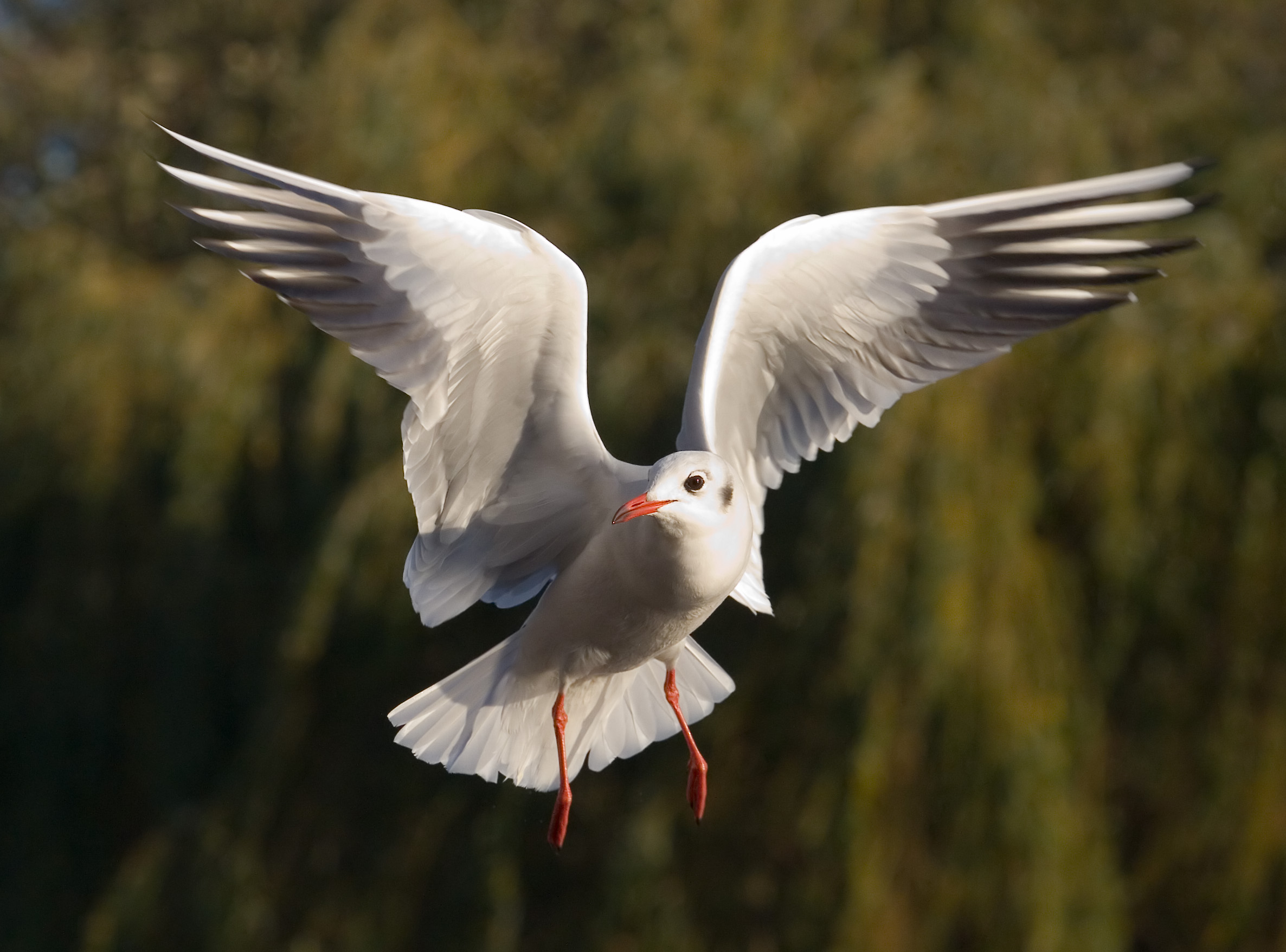
Blackheaded gull

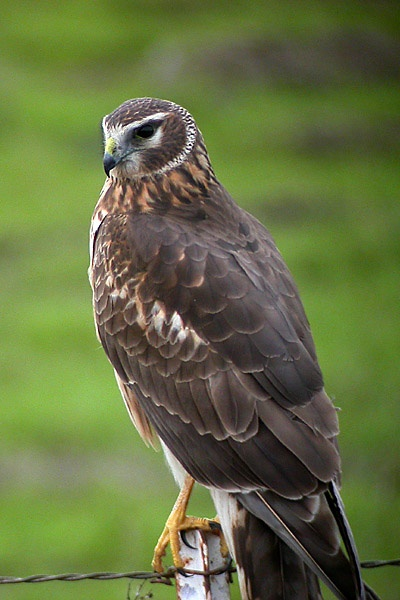
Hen harrier

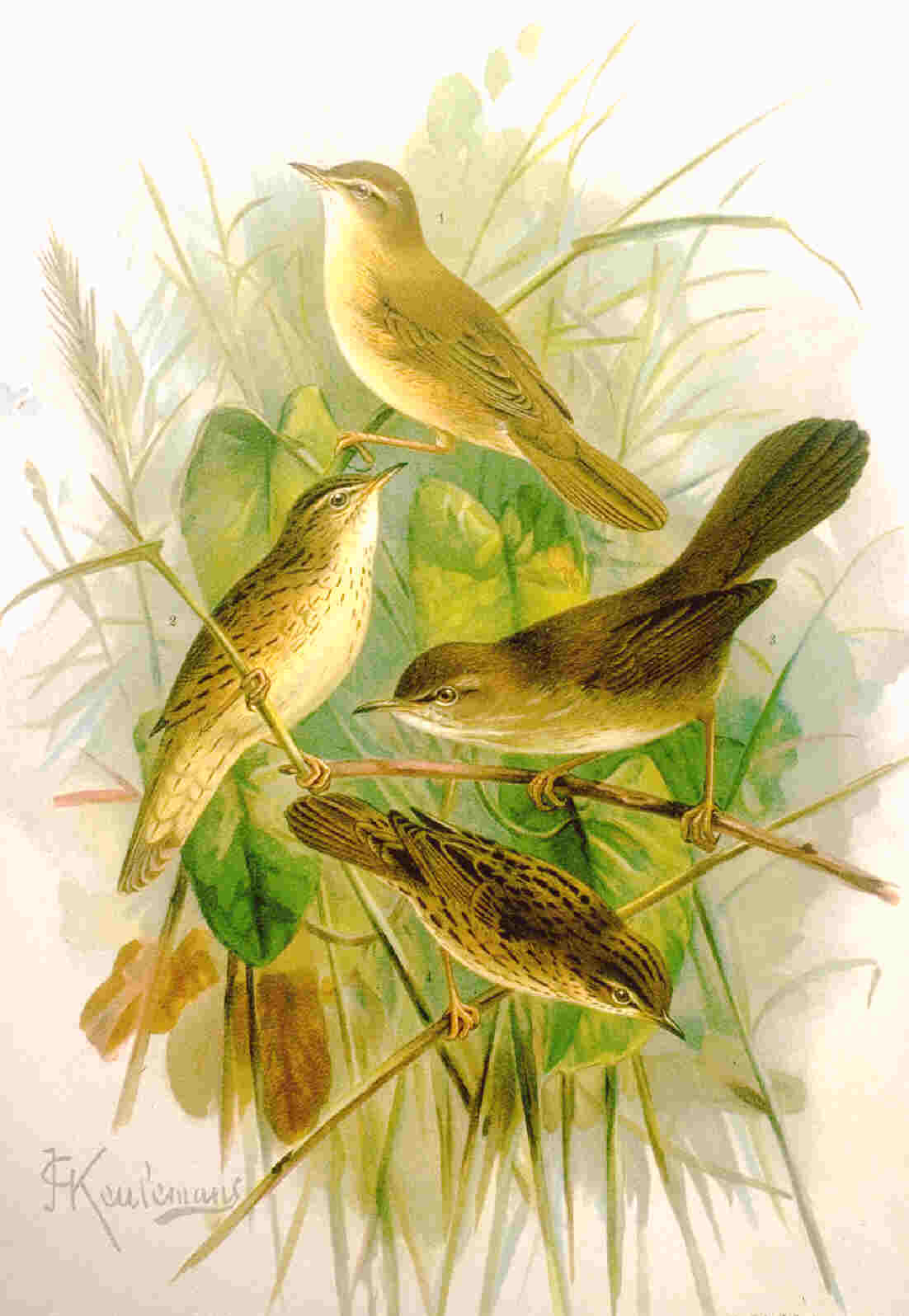
Cetti's warbler

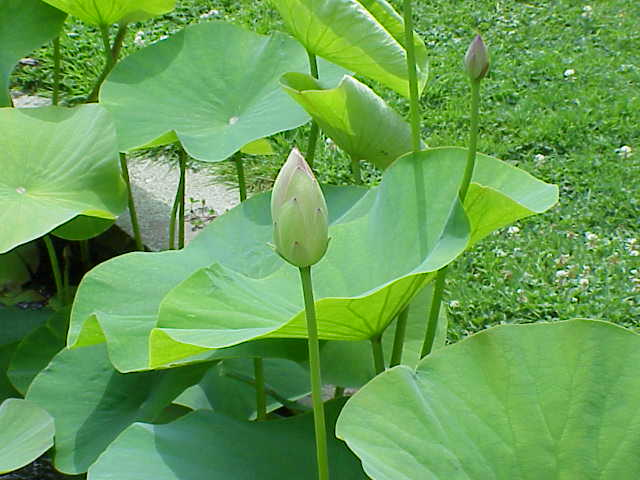
Nelumbo nucifera – lotus

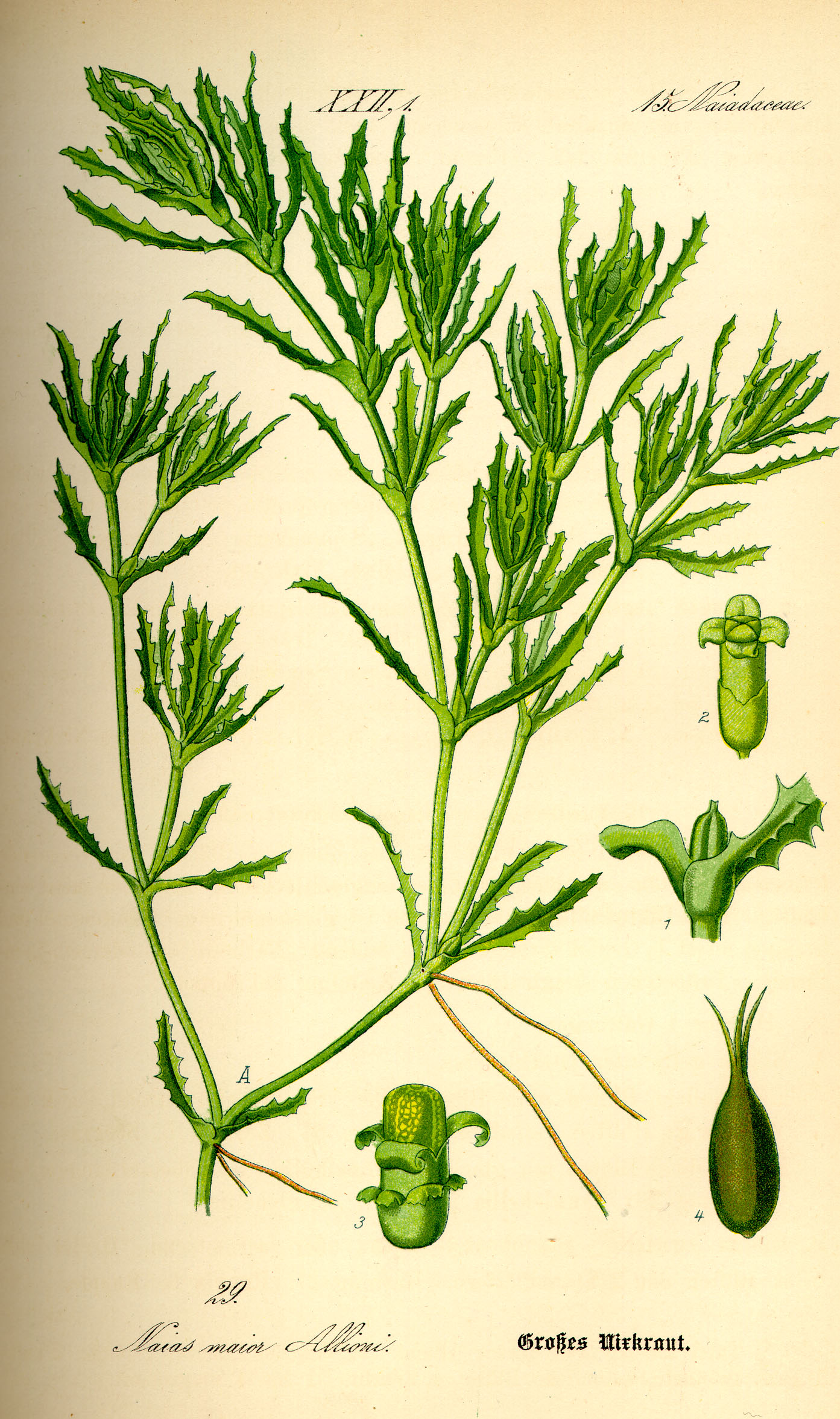

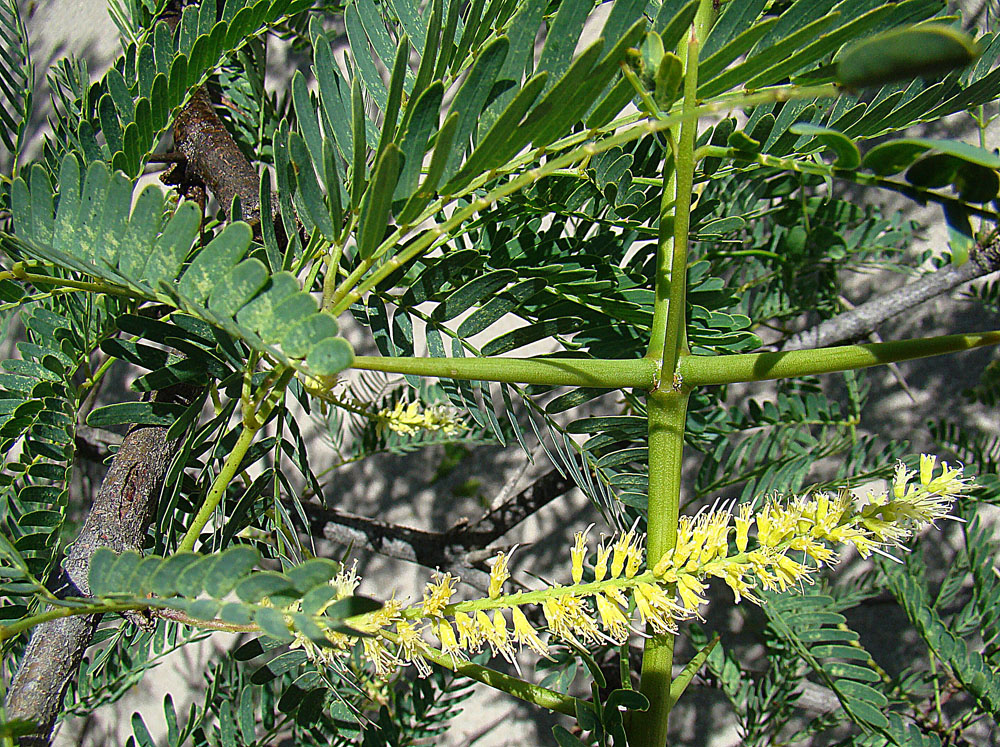
Prosopis juliflora

== See also ==
- Wetland
- Kanjli Wetland
