= Harbir Singh Sandhu =

Indian field hockey player (born 1990)

Personal information
- Born: 27 March 1990 (age 36) Gumtala, Amritsar, Punjab, India
- Height: 6 ft (183 cm)

Sport
- Sport: Field hockey
- Position: Defender
National team
Years	Team	Caps	Goals
2012–2014	India		-
Medal record
Men's field hockey
Asian Champions Trophy
Silver medal – second place	2012 Doha
- Updated on 5 August 2017

Harbir Singh Sandhu (born 27 March 1990) is an Indian field hockey player who plays as a defender.

Sandhu was first selected for the national team for the 2012 Men's Hockey Champions Trophy. He was part of India's provisional delegation for the 2014 Commonwealth Games but was denied accreditation after a background check by the United Kingdom Home Office.
