= Dosanjh, Moga =

Dosanjh
- Village
- Location in Punjab, India Dosanjh (India)
- Coordinates: 30.844716°N 75.203880°E
- Country: India
- State: Punjab
- District: Moga

Government
  - Type: Panchayati raj (India)
  - Body: Gram panchayat

Area
  - Total: 160 ha (395 acres)

Population
  - Total: 1,985
  - Density: 1,240/km^{2} (3,220/sq mi)

Languages
  - Official: Punjabi
- Time zone: UTC+5:30 (IST)
- PIN: 142003
- Telephone code: 01636
- Nearest city: Moga, Jagraon, Dharmkot, Kot Ise Khan
- Lok Sabha constituency: Faridkot
- Vidhan Sabha constituency: Dharmkot

Dosanjh is a village in the Indian state of Punjab. It is situated in Moga district. The village is divided in four pattis or streets, Kalha Patti, Gajju Patti, Budhu Patti, Rama Patti. The nearest villages are Tatariawala, Talwandi Bhangerian, and Fatehgarh Korotana.

== History ==
The village is home to the Sangha Jat Sikh people. Approximately 10% of the population from the Tonk Kashatria clan has lived there since 1800. The village was formerly known as Dosanjh Bhai Ka. There are two gurdwaras. The old gurdwara is on the northeast side which also houses the janjh ghar. The south side gurdwara constructed in 2004 is located near the government middle school near the highway.

Ruins were observed in 1955 of an old light tower made of small bricks in the forest preserve north of the old gurdwara across the pond. This lighthouse served as a beacon for the administration. It was said that the lighthouse from Jagraon was coordinated from this place. A three-story tower was constructed in 2015 at the same location. This forest preserve had much vegetation and many old trees, most were van trees, although many huge peapl and bohr trees survived in the 1950s. A variety of mammals and birds including peacocks inhabited this sanctuary and the old trees died. The rest were cut down by the village government in the 1970s and 1980s.

A huge bohar tree with a diameter of ten feet lived on the east side of the pond across the old gurdwara. This tree died in the 1960s and must have been 500 years old.

In the middle of the sanctuary, is a gurdwara building with deep dug out basement. Sages and saints used to stay here. They used the basement for meditation.

== School ==
Students from Dosanjh and the neighbouring village, Talwandi, attend the Guru Nanak Public School. A government middle school is situated near the gurdwara. The original building was constructed in 1955.

Before 1955, classes from kindergarten to grade four were held in a one-room katcha schoolhouse nearby. Students from Talwandi attended this school. The student population in 1954 was 70 with one teacher. School records were kept in a locked trunk.

== Demographics ==
According to the 2011 Indian census, the population of Dosanjh is 1,860, among 306 families.

== Revenue information ==
The town's Hadbast number is 26. Its patwar area is in Talwandi Bhangerian, and its kanungo area is Moga Mehla Singh.
