= Fatehgarh Panjtur =

- Village
- Location in Punjab, India Fatehgarh Panjtur (India)
- Coordinates: 31°03′09″N 75°06′39″E
- Country: India

Government
  - Body: Nagar panchayat of Fatehgarh Panjtoor

Area
  - Total: 7.62 km^{2} (2.94 sq mi)

Population (2011)
  - Total: 5,162
  - Density: 677/km^{2} (1,750/sq mi)

Languages
- Time zone: UTC+5:30 (IST)
- 142043: 142044
- Vehicle registration: PB 76

Fatehgarh Panjtur is a large village in Moga district of Punjab state of India. Fatehgarh Panjtur is a village in Kot-ise-khan block of the Moga District of Punjab State, India. It is located about 31 km north of district headquarters Moga. Moga, Zira and Makhu are the nearby cities.

== Demographics ==
As per 2011 Census of India, total population of Fatehgarh Panjtur was 5,162 persons. Total number of households in this village was 925 as per 2011 census. There were total of 2,756 male persons and 2,406 females and a total number of 559 children of 6 years or below in the village.

== Transportation ==
Fatehgarh Panjtur is located 5 km east of National Highway 703B which connects with district headquarters Moga city. The nearest railway station Jogiwala is located about 7.5 km north of village
