= Dosanjh =

Dosanjh may refer to:

- Dosanjh Kalan, a village in Jalandhar, Punjab, India
- Dosanjh Khurd, a village near Banga, Punjab, India
- Dosanjh, Moga, a village in Punjab, India
- Diljit Dosanjh (born 1984), an Indian singer
- Ujjal Dosanjh (born 1947), an Indo-Canadian politician and former premier of British Columbia
