= Harike =

- Village
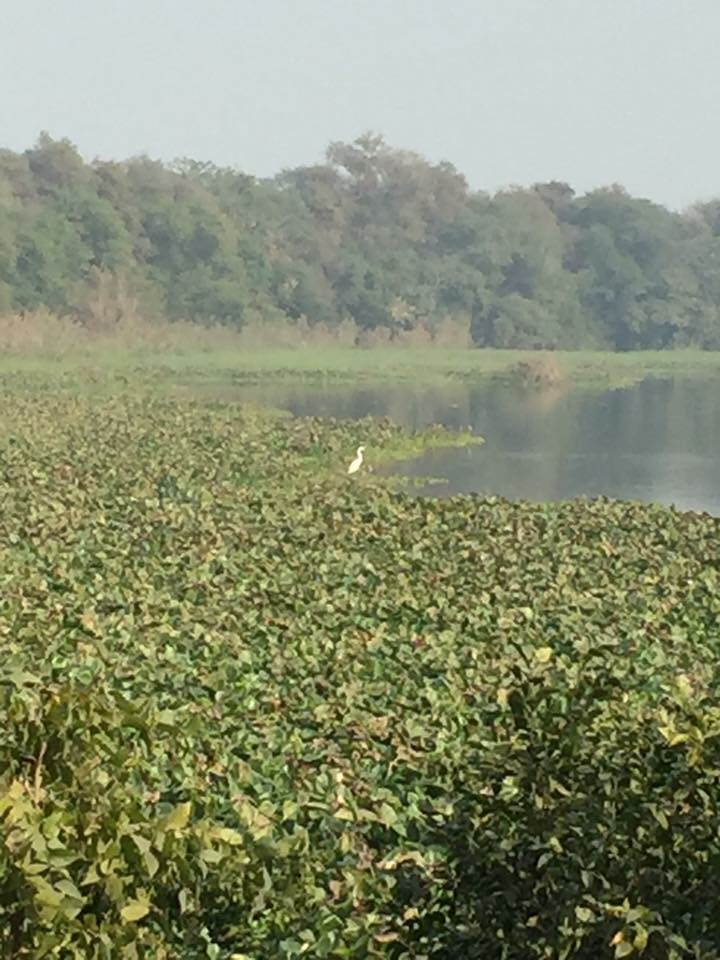
- Harike Wetland in Harike (Tarn Taran district, Punjab)
- Interactive map of Harike
- Location in Punjab, India Harike (India)
- Coordinates: 31°09′59″N 74°56′30″E
- Country: India
- State: Punjab
- District: Tarn Taran

Area
  - Total: 9.43 km^{2} (3.64 sq mi)
- Elevation: 210 m (690 ft)

Population (2011)
  - Total: 8,662
  - Density: 919/km^{2} (2,380/sq mi)

Languages
  - Official: Punjabi
- Time zone: UTC+5:30 (IST)
- PIN Code: 143412
- Vehicle registration: PB 38

Harike is a village in Patti Tehsil in Tarn Taran district of the Indian state of Punjab. It is located 33 km from Tarn Taran Sahib city. The PIN code of Wakro is 143412. Harike is connected by two national highways, National Highway 54 and National Highway 703B.

== Demographics ==
As per the 2011 Census of India, total number of households in Harike was 1620 and total population was 8,662 persons. There were total of 4,666 males and 3,996 females. There were 1,136 children of six years or below in Harike in 2011. The percentage of male population was 53.8% and the percentage of female population was 46.2%. Average Sex Ratio of Harike is 856 which is lower than Punjab state average of 895.

== Harike bird sanctuary ==
Harike barrage and Harike Wetland which are named after Harike village are located near this village. Migratory birds flock to this protected largest wetland in North India in winters.
