= Bhitiwala =

- Village
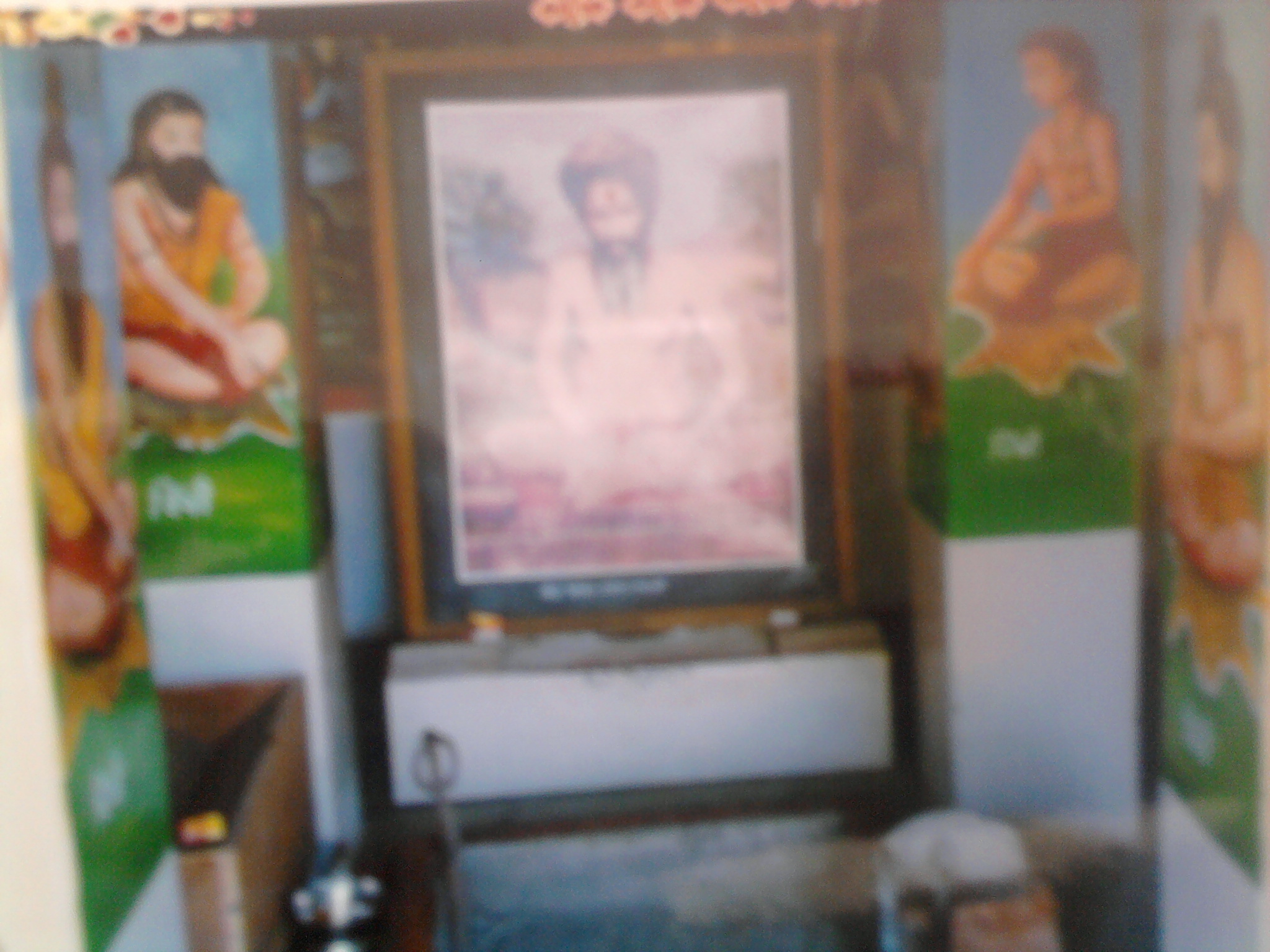
- Samadh of Baba Tehaldas jiat Bhitiwala village.

- Location in Punjab Bhitiwala (India)
- Coordinates: 29°58′41″N 74°30′00″E
- Country: India
- State: Punjab
- District: Mukatsar

Languages
  - Official: Punjabi
- Time zone: UTC+5:30 (IST)
- PIN: Multiple
- Telephone code0161: 91-01637-XXX XXXX

Bhitiwala is a village in Malout tehsil of Sri Muktsar Sahib district, Punjab, India. It is located in the southern part of the district and lies is 61 km (38 mi) away from Mukatsar. The state capital Chandigarh is 285 km (177 mi) and New Delhi is 340 km (210 mi) from Bhitiwala.

== Geography and climate ==
The soil of Bhitiwala is fertile. 'Lambi Distributary' the canal runs in the east of the village. It is built on high land than the land of main village. 'Bahawala Sem Naala'(the drain) has been built. There are five ponds (Chhapar in Punjabi) in the village.

== History ==
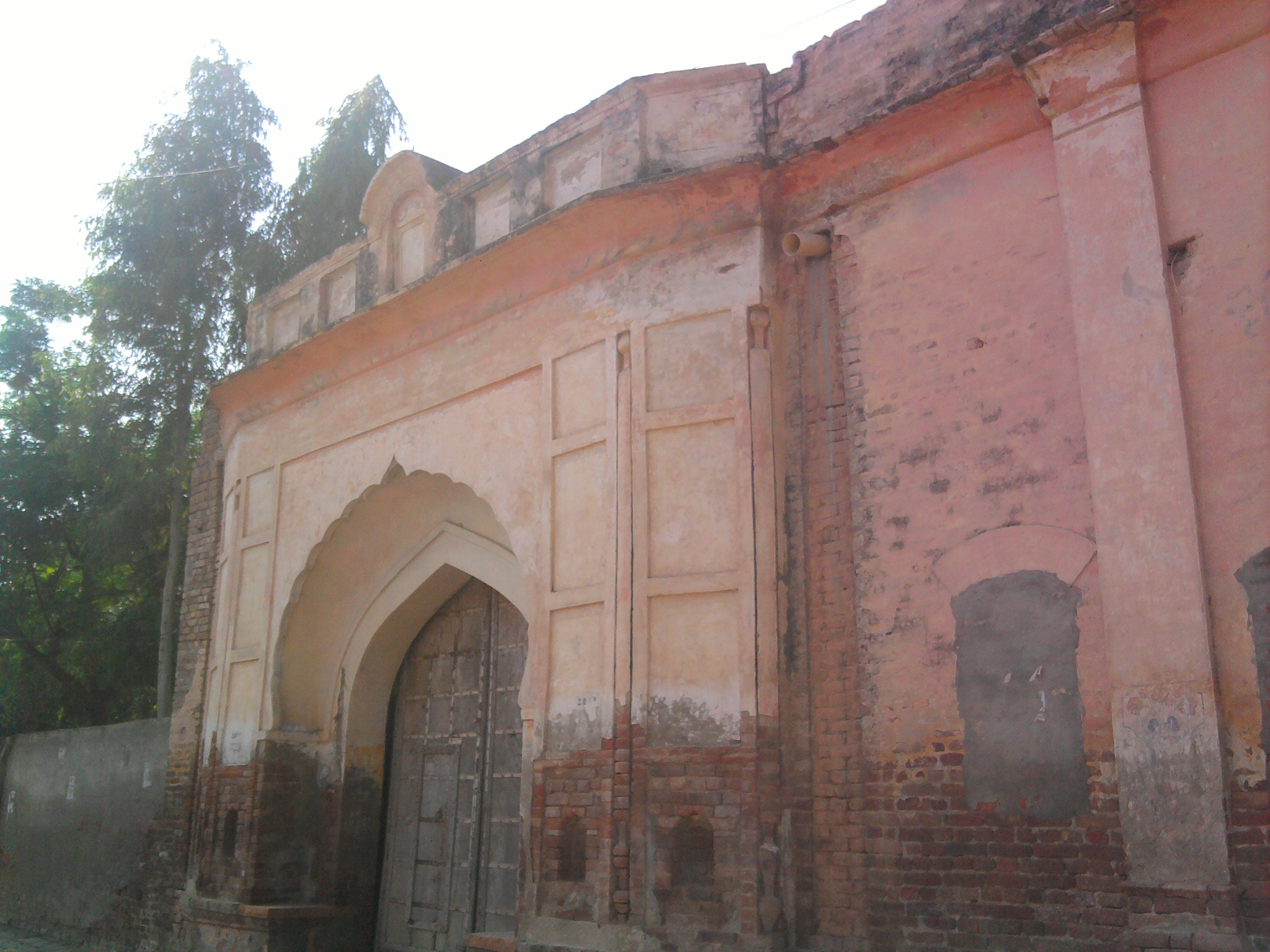
This architecture is being replaced by Western or European architecture in this area.

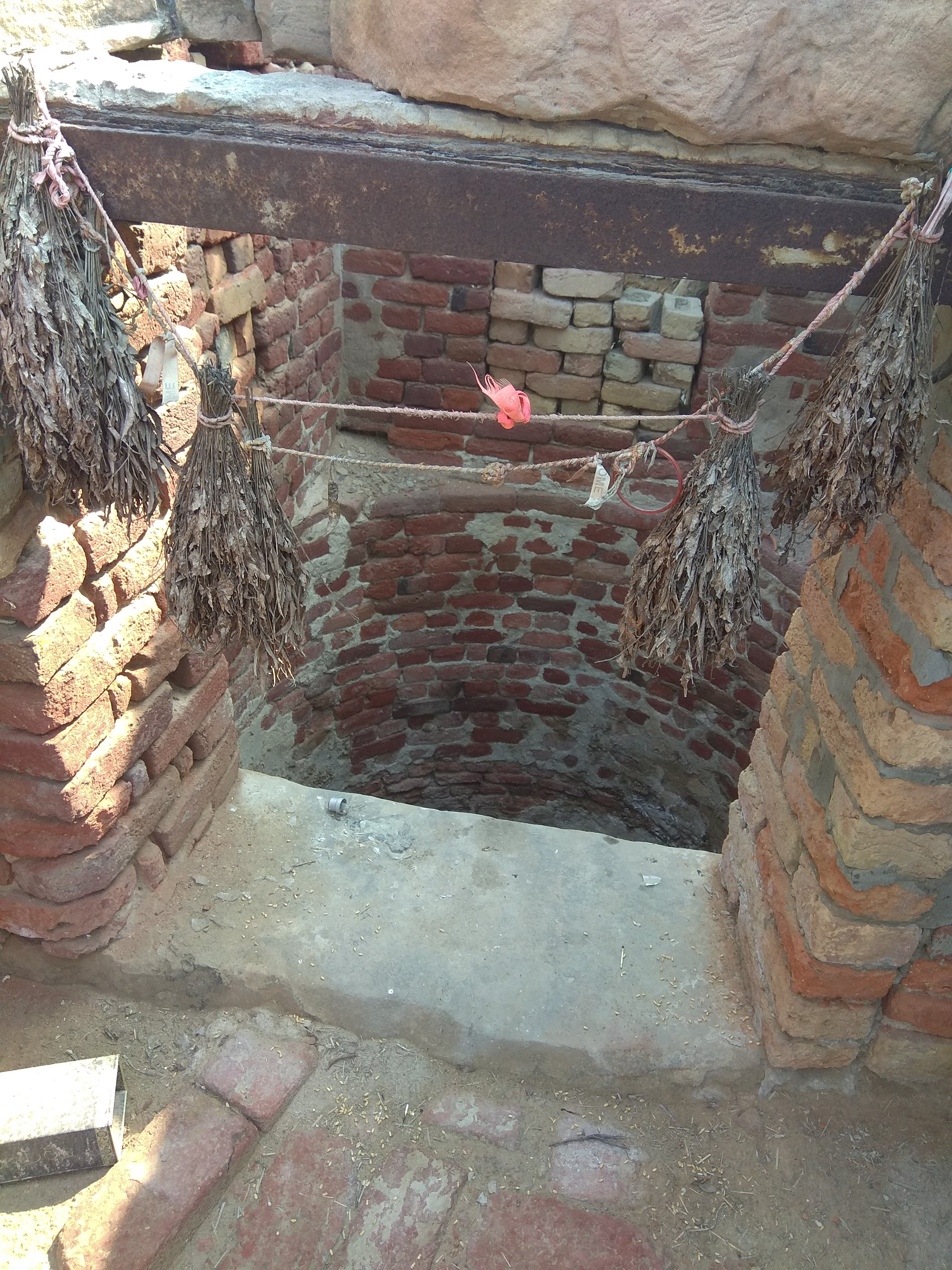
It is about an old village well in Bhitiwla village.

It is an old village. Before 1947, Muslims were also inhabitants of the village. Telis Muslims were also among them. Muslims migrated in 1947. During riots in Punjab this village remained peaceful and no violent incident happened. Sikhs were always in majority. Sant Tehaldas ji of Udasin sampardaya (tradition) has an important place in the history of this village. He used to live in a hut near a canal. He had a simple living. He was a revered man among people; he gave a message of love and cooperation. He told people of Bhitiwala that village Bhitiwala will remain always peaceful but always should be careful about the water of the canal. Sant Tahaldas died on 5 December 1957.

== Governance ==
Bhitiwala has a grampanchayat status. Pawandeep singh is Sarpanch of village.

== Culture ==
Punjabi is the main language. People wear kurta, payjama, chaadara, pent and shirt. Women wear Punjabi suits. Some changes in the culture has been seen in last decades. Women have almost left spinning on Charkha. Tiyaan is not held now. Homes are equipped with modern electronic appliances. Dth and FM radio has changed mode of entertainment. Kothis aka English bungalows are taking place of old havelis. Bagri a dialect of Rajasthani language is also spoken by some people mainly living in south-east of village.

== Attractions ==
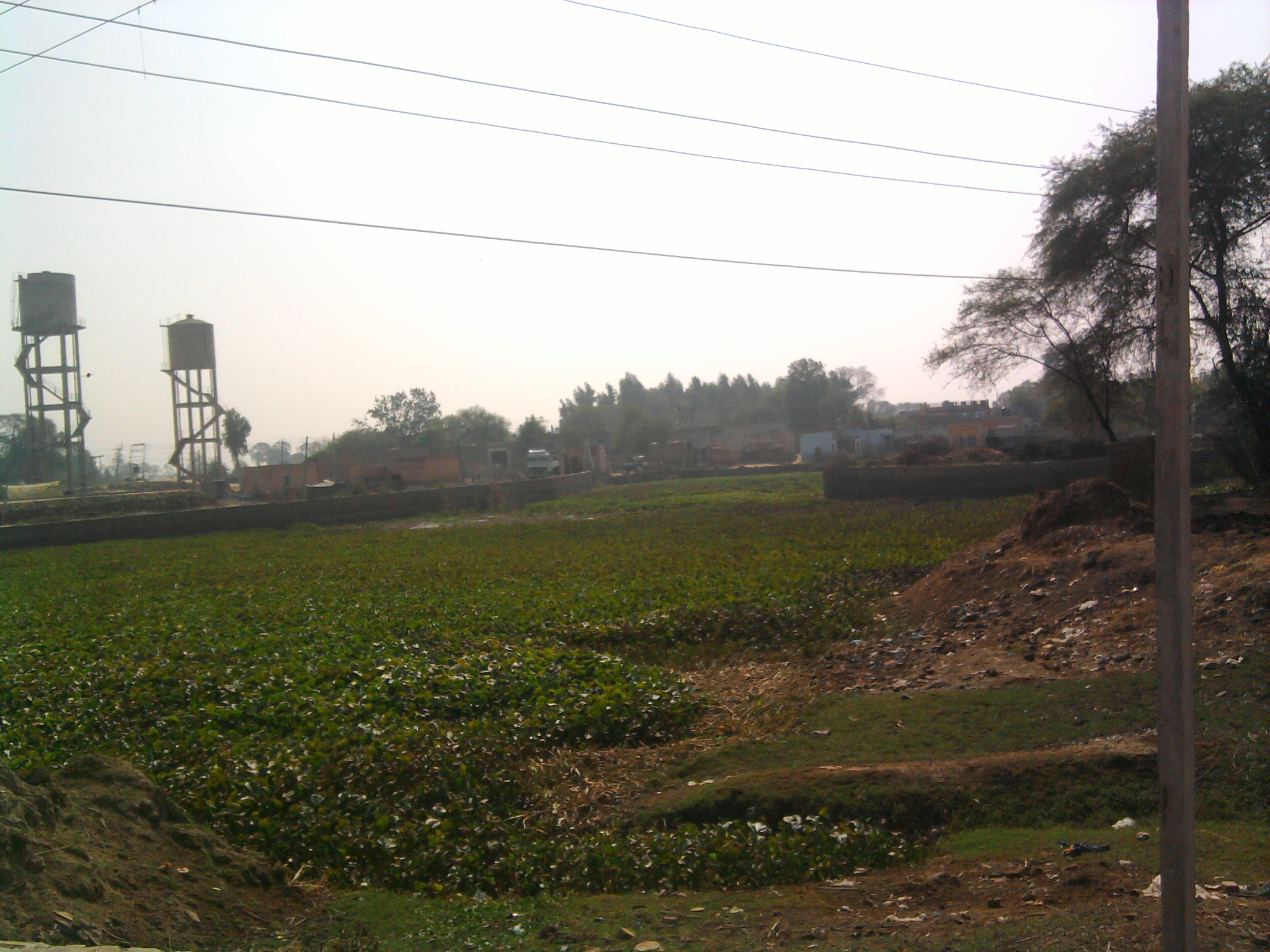
A Scene of the pond near water-works.

Samadh of Baba Tehaldas is sightworthy. It is located in south-east of Bhitiwala. Barsi (Death anniversary) of Baba Tehaldas is celebrated on 20 Magghar. A Guruduara has been built on Abohar-Dabwali road.

== Sports ==
Cricket, kabbadi, and volleyball are very popular here.

== Gallery ==
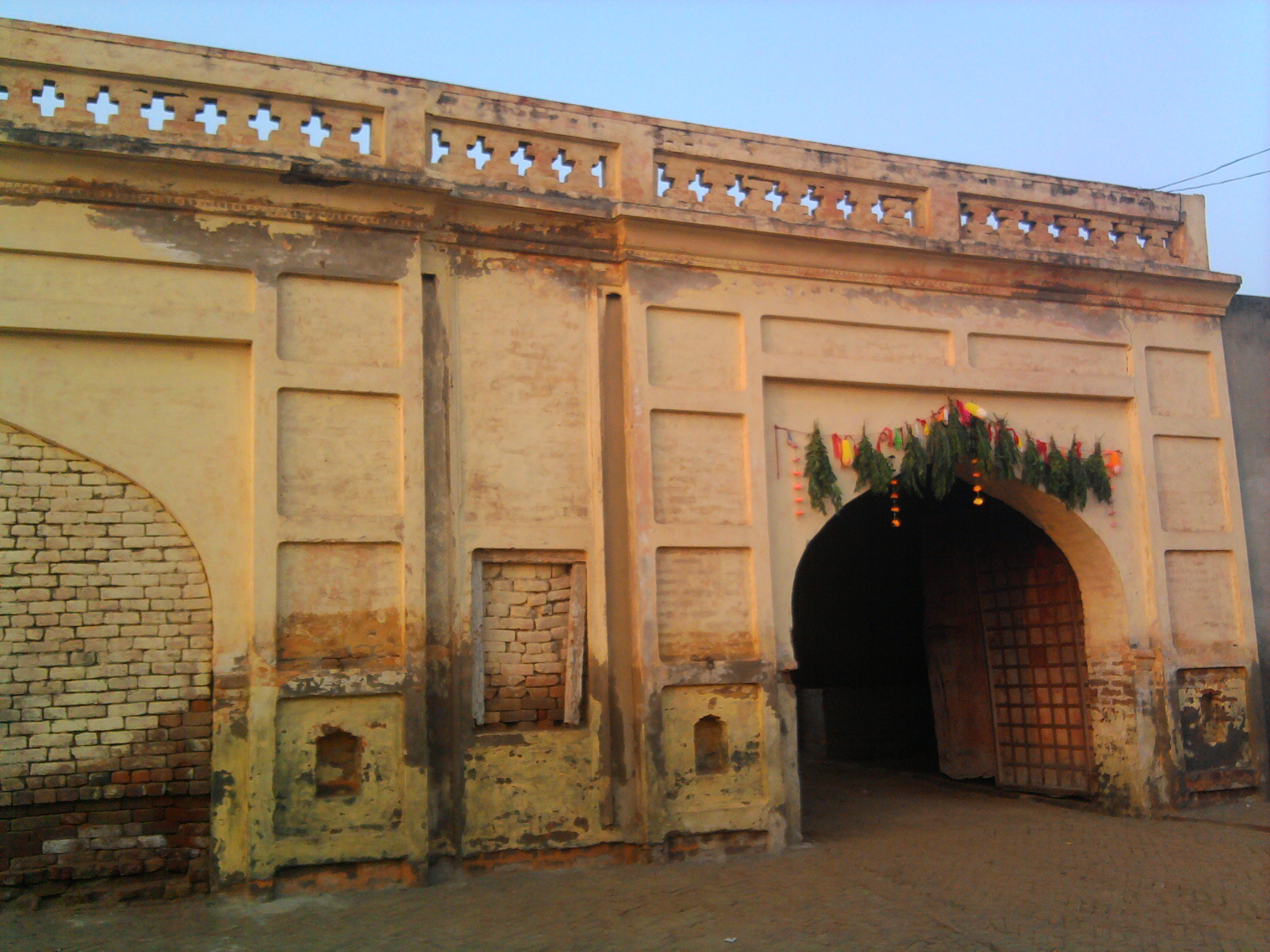
Another traditional Malwayi Punjabi styled gate at Bhitwala.

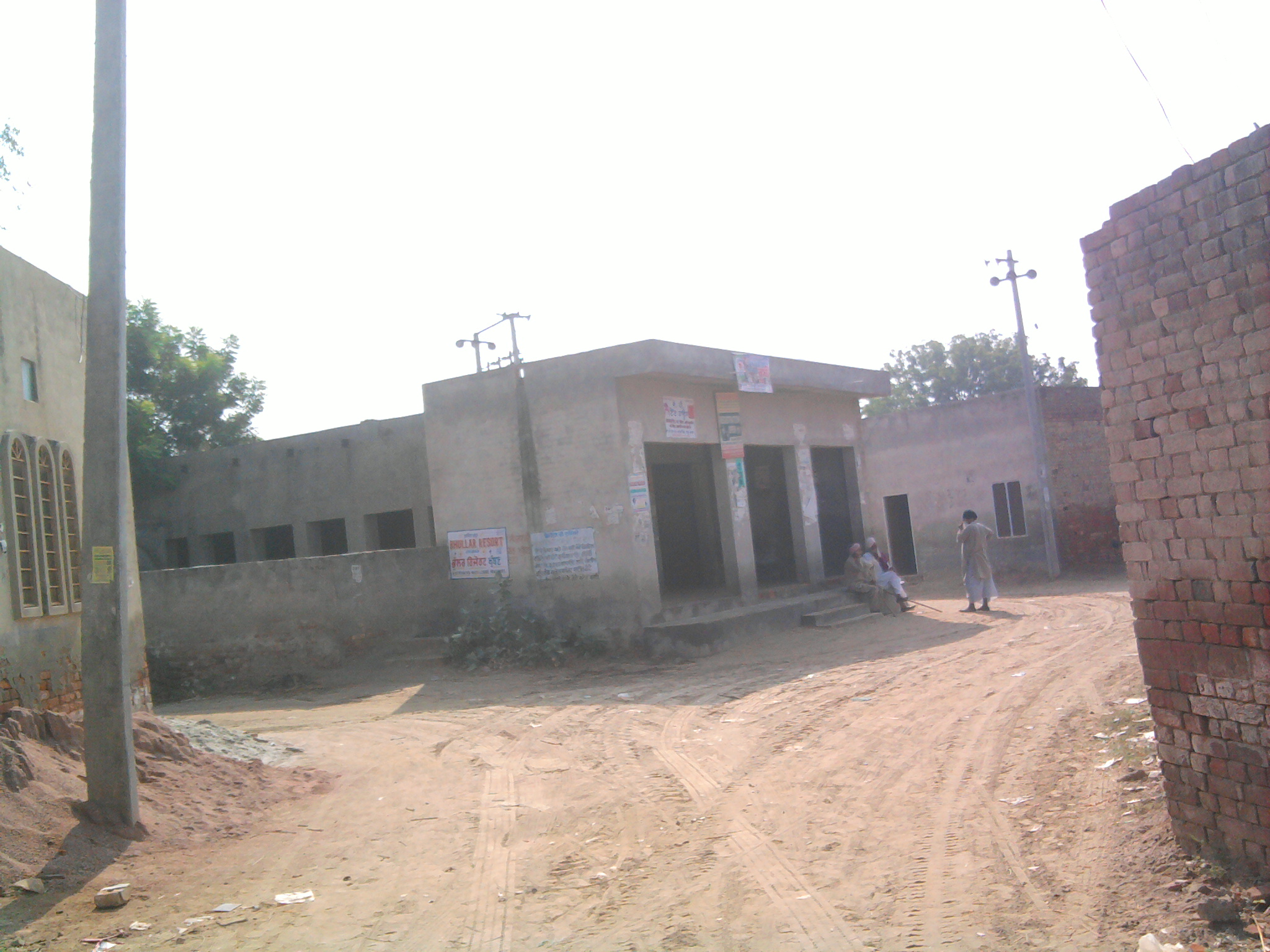
Bhitiwala Satth, the community center.

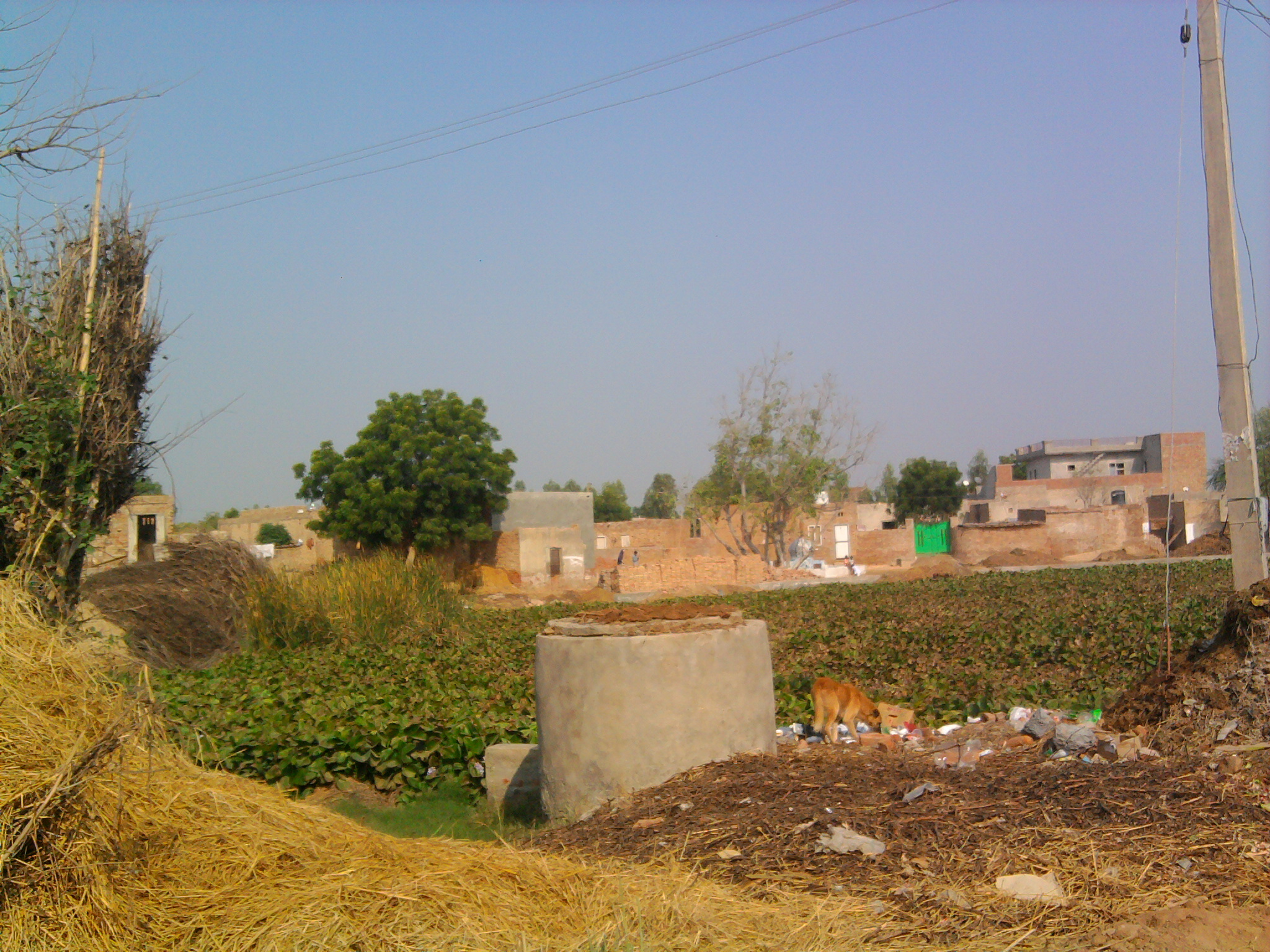
Bhitwala Pond near Satth
