= National Highway 354 (India) =

National Highway in India

National Highway 354
- Map of National Highway 354 in red

Route information
- Length: 247 km (153 mi)

Major junctions
- North end: Gurdaspur, Panjab
- South end: Malout, Panjab

Location
- Country: India
- States: Panjab
- Primary destinations: Gurdaspur, Kalanaur, Bishankot, Dera Baba Nanak, Ajnala, Rajasansi, Gumtala, Amritsar, Bhikhiwind, Khem Karan, Makhu, Mallanwala Khas, Ferozpur, Jhok Sarkari, Sri Muktsar Sahib

Highway system
- Roads in India; Expressways; National; State; Asian
← NH 54	→ NH 7

National Highway 354, commonly referred to as NH 354 is a national highway in India. It is a spur road of National Highway 54 under Bharatmala in the Indian state of Punjab.

== Route ==
Gurdaspur – Kalanaur – Dera Baba Nanak – Ajnala - Raja Sansi – Amritsar - Chabhal-Bhikhiwind – Khem Karan Makhu– Arifke – Ferozpur -Jhok Sarkari – Sadiq – Sri Muktsar Sahib – Malout.

== Junctions ==
- NH 54 in Gurdaspur
- NH 3 in Amritsar
- NH 703B in Bhikhiwind
- NH 703A in Arifke
- NH 5 in Ferozpur
- NH 754 in Sri Muktsar Sahib
- NH 7 in Malout

== See also ==
- List of national highways in India
- List of national highways in India by state
