= Kot Ise Khan =

Kot Ise Khan, Punjab
- Town
- Location in Punjab, India Kot Ise Khan, Punjab (India)
- Coordinates: 30.943699°N 75.137826°E
- Country: India
- State: Punjab
- District: Moga
- Founder: Isa Khan Manj

Government
  - Type: Local Government
  - Body: State Government of Punjab, Government of India

Area
  - Total: 5 km^{2} (1.9 sq mi)
- Elevation: 221 m (725 ft)

Population (2011)
  - Total: 13,000
  - Density: 2,753/km^{2} (7,130/sq mi)

Languages
  - Principal: Punjabi, Hindi
- Time zone: UTC+5:30 (IST)
- PIN: 142043
- Telephone code: 01682
- Vehicle registration: PB- 76

Kot Ise Khan is a town in Moga district of Indian state of Punjab.

== History ==
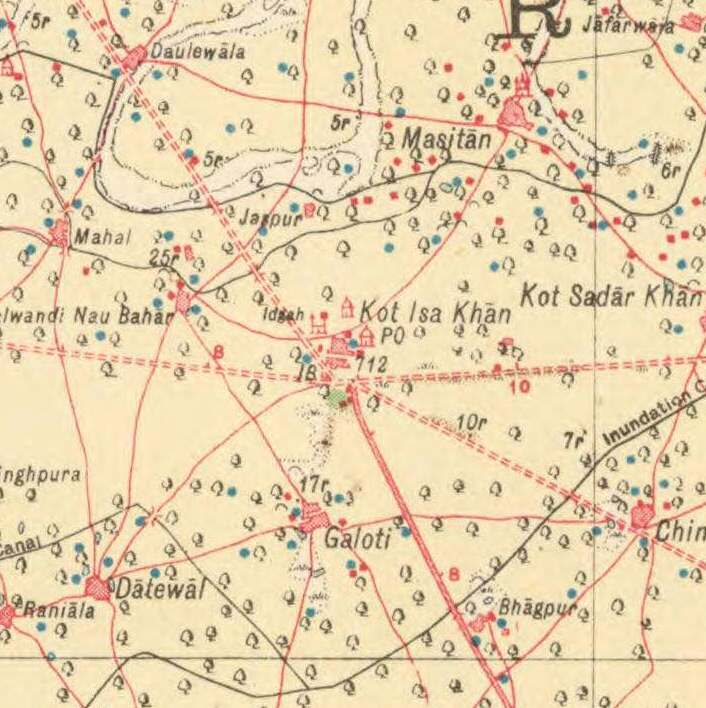
Kot Ise Khan town in Kot Ise Khan tehsil, Survey of India geographical block-map for 44 N NW Ferozepore (1921)

Kot Ise Khan was established by the Manj Rajput chief, Ise Khan Manj. Due to an epidemic in 1543, many Bhabra Jain traders from Ferozepur shifted to Kot Ise Khan.

== Location ==
This town is located on Moga-Makhu section of National Highway 703B in Moga District. Moga is at a distance of 15 Kilometers from Kot Ise Khan. Other nearby towns are Zira, Makhu and Dharamkot.
