= 2012 Men's Asian Champions Trophy =

Hockey tournament

Tournament details
- Host country: Qatar
- City: Doha
- Dates: 20–27 December
- Teams: 6 (from 1 confederation)
- Venue: Al-Rayyan Stadium

Final positions
- Champions: Pakistan (1st title)
- Runner-up: India
- Third place: Malaysia

Tournament statistics
- Matches played: 18
- Goals scored: 111 (6.17 per match)
- Top scorer: (Pakistan) Muhammad Waqas (11 goals)
- Best player: (Pakistan) Muhammad Waqas

The 2012 Men's Asian Champions Trophy was the second edition of the Men's Asian Champions Trophy. The tournament was held from 20 to 27 December 2012 in Doha, Qatar. The top six Asian teams (India, Oman, Pakistan, China, Malaysia and Japan) participated in the tournament, which involved round-robin league among all teams followed by play-offs for final positions.

India, the defending champions, were beaten 5-4 by Pakistan in the final.

== Teams ==
Team	Appearance	Last appearance	Previous best performance
China	2nd	2011	6th (2011)
India	2nd	2011	1st (2011)
Japan	2nd	2011	4th (2011)
Malaysia	2nd	2011	3rd (2011)
Oman	1st	None	Debut
Pakistan	2nd	2011	2nd (2011)

== Fixtures ==
All times are Arabia Standard Time (UTC+3)

=== Round robin ===
Pos	Team	Pld	W	D	L	GF	GA	GD	Pts	Qualification
1	India	5	4	0	1	23	7	+16	12	Final
2	Pakistan	5	3	1	1	22	12	+10	10	Final
3	Malaysia	5	3	1	1	17	10	+7	10	Third place game
4	China	5	3	0	2	15	13	+2	9	Third place game
5	Japan	5	1	0	4	13	17	−4	3	Fifth place game
6	Oman	5	0	0	5	6	37	−31	0	Fifth place game

Source: FIH

20 December 2012
15:00

Malaysia	4–1	Japan
Tengku 3'; Faizal 17'; Hafifi 32'; Razie 58'	Report	Tachibana 65'

Umpires:
Haider Rasool (PAK)
Shin Dong-yun (KOR)

20 December 2012
17:00

India	4–0	China
Sunil 13'; Raghunath 18', 53'; 54'	Report

Umpires:
Jang Jung-min (KOR)
Lingam Karupusamy (MAS)

20 December 2012
19:00

Oman	3–8	Pakistan
Rajab 14', 57'; Bait Jandal 20'	Report	Rizwan 2'; Waqas 30', 63'; Abbasi 39', 61', 68'; Khan 51'; Imran 54'

Umpires:
Pankaj Tyagi (IND)
You Suolong (CHN)

21 December 2012
15:00

Japan	1–3	India
Kayukawa 50'	Report	Raghunath 22', 59'; Gurwinder 51'

Umpires:
You Suolong (CHN)
Saleh Al-Balushi (OMA)

21 December 2012
17:00

Pakistan	5–2	China
Waqas 9', 33'; Abbasi 23'; Khan 53', 69'	Report	Yu Yang 10'; Liu Yixian 25'

Umpires:
Lingam Karupusamy (MAS)
Shin Dong-yun (KOR)

21 December 2012
19:00

Oman	1–4	Malaysia
Bait Jandal 16'	Report	Faizal 23'; Razie 28', 63'; Tengku 66'

Umpires:
Yoshikuni Tomiyama (JPN)
Pankaj Tyagi (IND)

23 December 2012
15:00

China	4–2	Japan
Dong Yang 3'; Song Yi 35', 40'; Liu Yixian 62'	Report	K. Kawakami 28'; Kayukawa 65'

Umpires:
Saleh Al-Balushi (OMA)
Lingam Karupusamy (MAS)

23 December 2012
17:00

Oman	0–11	India
	Report	Sunil 3'; Dharamvir 7', 56'; Raghunath 29', 38'; Rupinder 31', 43'; Gurwinder 44'; Akashdeep 52'; Harbir 64'; Danish 66'

Umpires:
Haider Rasool (PAK)
Jang Jung-min (KOR)

23 December 2012
19:00

Pakistan	3–3	Malaysia
Rizwan 21'; Waqas 55', 57'	Report	20'; Faizal 43'; Tengku 68'

Umpires:
Yoshikuni Tomiyama (JPN)
Pankaj Tyagi (IND)

24 December 2012
15:00

Oman	1–7	Japan
Rajab 7'	Report	11'; Kawauchi 21', 45'; Ijima 22'; K. Kawakami 32'; Nagasawa 49', 54'

Umpires:
You Suolong (CHN)
Pankaj Tyagi (IND)

24 December 2012
17:00

China	2–1	Malaysia
Huang Yue 31'; Song Yi 34'	Report	Faizal 63'

Umpires:
Haider Rasool (PAK)
Shin Dong-yun (KOR)

24 December 2012
19:00

Pakistan	1–2	India
Waqas 56'	Report	Rupinder 36'; Chinglensana 49'

Umpires:
Lingam Karupusamy (MAS)
Jang Jung-min (KOR)

26 December 2012
13:00

China	7–1	Oman
Liu Yixian 4', 69'; Song Yi 9', 46'; Dong Yang 27'; Guo Zhong Qiang 32'; Sun Tianjun 56'	Report	51'

Umpires:
Shin Dong-yun (KOR)
Yoshikuni Tomiyama (JPN)

26 December 2012
15:00

Pakistan	5–2	Japan
Waqas 1', 36'; Abbasi 34'; Khan 44', 63'	Report	Yoshihara 8'; Tachibana 23'

Umpires:
Saleh Al-Balushi (OMA)
You Suolong (CHN)

26 December 2012
17:00

Malaysia	5–3	India
Fitri 18', 27'; Azlan 20'; Faizal 38'; Adabi 68'	Report	Birendra 48'; Sunil 61'; Raghunath 63'

Umpires:
Jang Jung-min (KOR)
Haider Rasool (PAK)

=== Classification round ===
==== Fifth place game ====
27 December 2012
14:30

Japan	1–2	Oman
Kawauchi 29'	Report	Saad Jumaan 33'; Al-Shibli 70'

Umpires:
You Suolong (CHN)
Lingam Karupusamy (MAS)

==== Third place game ====
27 December 2012
17:00

Malaysia	3–1	China
Marhan 40'; Razie 60'; 61'	Report	Liu Yixian 19'

Umpires:
Pankaj Tyagi (IND)
Haider Rasool (PAK)

==== Final ====
27 December 2012
19:30

India	4–5	Pakistan
Sunil 8'; Raghunath 21'; Gurwinder 55'; Rupinder 59'	Report	Waqas 7', 56'; Rasool 42'; Mehmood 48'; Ateeq 64'

Umpires:
Jang Jung-min (KOR)
Shin Dong-yun (KOR)

== Statistics ==
=== Final standings ===
1. Pakistan
2. India
3. Malaysia
4. China
5. Oman
6. Japan

=== Goalscorers ===
There were 112 goals scored in 18 matches, for an average of 6.22 goals per match.

11 goals

- (Pakistan) Muhammad Waqas

8 goals

- (India) V. R. Raghunath

5 goals

- (China) Liu Yixian
- (China) Song Yi
- (Malaysia) Faizal Saari
- (Pakistan) Shakeel Abbasi
- (Pakistan) Abdul Haseem Kham

4 goals

- (India) Rupinder Pal Singh
- (India) S. V. Sunil
- (Malaysia) Razie Rahim

3 goals

- (India) Gurwinder Singh Chandi
- (Japan) Shinji Kawauchi
- (Malaysia) Tengku Ahmad Tajuddin
- (Oman) Basim Khatar Rajab

2 goals

- (China) Dong Yang
- (India) Dharamvir Singh
- (Japan) Kei Kawakami
- (Japan) Koji Kayukawa
- (Japan) Katsuyoshi Nagasawa
- (Japan) Toshiro Tachibana
- (Malaysia) Fitri Saari
- (Oman) Mohammed Bait Jandal
- (Pakistan) Muhammad Rizwan Sr.

1 goal

- (China) Guo Zhong Qiang
- (China) Huang Yue
- (China) Sun Tianjun
- (China) Yu Yang
- (India) Chinglensana Kangujam
- (India) Birendra Lakra
- (India) Danish Mujtaba
- (India) Harbir Singh Sandhu
- (India) Akashdeep Singh
- (Japan) Hiroki Ijima
- (Japan) Heita Yoshihara
- (Malaysia) Adabi Azammi
- (Malaysia) Hafifi Hanafi
- (Malaysia) Marhan Jalil
- (Malaysia) Azlan Misron
- (Oman) Samir Al-Shibli
- (Oman) Anwar Saad Jumaan
- (Pakistan) Muhammad Ateeq
- (Pakistan) Muhammad Imran
- (Pakistan) Rashid Mehmood
- (Pakistan) Shafqat Rasool

1 own goal

- Oman (against Japan)
- Pakistan (against Malaysia)

3 own goals

- China (against India, Malaysia & Oman)

Source: FIH
