= Arifke =

Arif Ke Arifke
- Village
- Interactive map of Arif Ke
- Location in Punjab, India Arif Ke (India)
- Coordinates: 31°02′20″N 74°44′22″E
- Country: India
- State: Punjab
- District: Firozpur

Government
  - Body: Gram panchayat

Area
  - Total: 8.48 km^{2} (3.27 sq mi)

Population (2011)
  - Total: 2,757
  - Density: 325/km^{2} (842/sq mi)

Languages
  - Official: Punjabi
- Time zone: UTC+5:30 (IST)
- PIN: 152021
- Telephone code: 01632
- Vehicle registration: PB 05
- Nearest city: Firozpur
- Civic agency: Gram Panchayat

Arifke or Arif Ke, is a village in Firozepur tehsil of the Firozpur district in Punjab, India. Arifke is located on the junction of the national highways NH 354 and NH 703A.

== Demographics ==
As per 2011 Census of India, the total population of Arifke was 2,757 persons in 528 households. The population included 1,462 males, 1,295 females and 327 children of 6 years or below. The percentage of male population is 53.03%, the percentage of female population is 46.97% and the percentage of child population is 11.86%. Average sex ratio of Arifke is 886, which is lower than the Punjab state average of 895.

=== Literacy ===
In 2011, the literacy rate of Arifke was 65.10 % compared to 75.84 % of Punjab. In Arifke, male literacy was 69.64 % and female literacy rate was 59.98 %.
