= Dharamkot, Moga =

Town in Indian Punjab

Dharamkot
- Municipal council
- Location in Punjab, India Dharamkot (India)
- Coordinates: 30°56′29″N 75°13′58″E
- Country: India

Government
  - Body: Municipal Council

Area
  - Total: 19.5 km^{2} (7.5 sq mi)

Population (2011)
  - Total: 19,057
  - Density: 977/km^{2} (2,530/sq mi)

Languages
- Time zone: UTC+5:30 (IST)
- Postal code: 142042
- Vehicle registration: PB 76

Dharamkot is a "Semi-Urban City" and a municipal council in the Moga district in the state of Punjab, India. Current estimated population of Dharamkot Municipal Council in 2026 is approximately 28,400. The Dharamkot administrative area comprises approximately 150 villages. Dharamkot is situated on the Moga–Jalandhar road,National Highway 703 (NH 703), in Moga district, Punjab.

== History ==
Dharamkot has historical associations with the Sikh misls of the eighteenth century. Historical accounts of the period mention Dharamkot among territories that came under Sikh chiefs during the expansion of Sikh power in Punjab.Gupta, Hari Ram. History of the Sikhs: The Sikh Commonwealth or Rise and Fall of Sikh Misls. Munshiram Manoharlal.

During the early nineteenth century, the area came within the sphere of the Sikh Empire. A list prepared in 1828 concerning territories claimed by Maharaja Ranjit Singh records Dharamkot among the places connected with the Lahore government.Gupta, Hari Ram. History of the Sikhs: The Sikh Lion of Lahore, Maharaja Ranjit Singh, 1799–1839. Munshiram Manoharlal.

Following the colonial reorganisation of Punjab, Dharamkot eventually formed part of Firozpur district and, prior to its transfer to Moga district, was associated administratively with the Zira area.

Moga district was created on 24 November 1995 from territory that had previously formed part of Faridkot district. Dharamkot remained outside the newly created district initially. On 5 November 1999, the Government of Punjab transferred the Dharamkot block, comprising 150 villages, to Moga district."History". District Moga. Government of Punjab. Dharamkot subsequently developed as one of the administrative subdivisions and tehsils of Moga district.

== Demographics ==
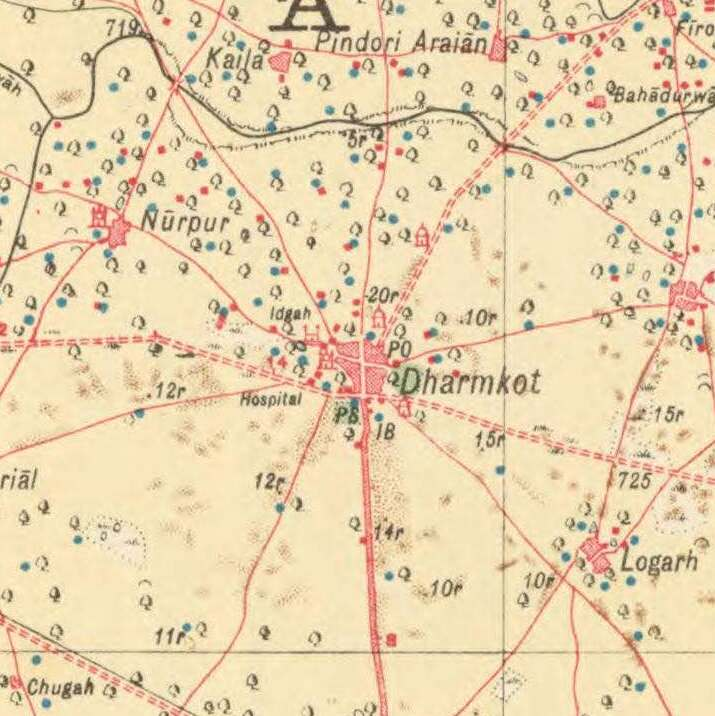
Dharamkot town in Kot Ise Khan tehsil, Survey of India geographical block-map for 44 N NW Ferozepore (1921)

As of the 2001 India census, Dharamkot had a population of 15,399. Males constitute 33% of the population and females 67%. Dharamkot has an average literacy rate of 62%, higher than the national average of 59.5%; male literacy is 70%, and female literacy is 59%. In Dharamkot, 94% of the population is under 66 years of age.

== Neighbouring Towns and Cities ==
The town currently forms a tensil/sub- division in Moga District.

Dharamkot is approximately 16km from Moga, 42 km from Nakodar, 65 km from Jalandhar, 24 km from Zira, 60 km from Ferozpur, 12 km from Kot Ise Khan, 25 km from Sidhwan Bet, and 32 km from Jagraon.
