= Gumtala =

- Urban Area
- Location in Punjab, India Gumtala (India)
- Coordinates: 31°39′52″N 74°51′14″E
- Country: India
- UrbanState: Punjab
- District: Jalandhar
- Time zone: UTC+5:30 (IST)
- PIN: 143001
- Telephone code: 0183
- Vehicle registration: PB- 02

Gumtala was a very Village but now it is an urban area of Amritsar India in the state of Punjab. It is very close to the Sri Guru Ram Dass Jee International Airport.It is just 6 k.m. away from Golden Temple. It serves as a major interchange of two national highways i.e. National Highway 354 (India) and National Highway 3 (India).

== About ==
Village Gumtala is very close to the guru ram das ji international airport in Amritsar Punjab. Gumtala is known in the region as the village with large homes or "kothis". The village residents mainly have the surname Pahal and are known as wealthy land owners.
