= National Highway 703B (India) =

National Highway in India

National Highway 703B
- Map of National Highway 703B in red

Route information
- Auxiliary route of NH 3
- Length: 75 km (47 mi)

Major junctions
- East end: Moga
- West end: Khalra

Location
- Country: India
- States: Punjab
- Primary destinations: Harike, Bhikhiwind

Highway system
- Roads in India; Expressways; National; State; Asian
← NH 703	→ NH 354

National Highway 703B, commonly referred to as NH 703B is a national highway in India. It is a secondary route of National Highway 3 in the state of Punjab in India.

== Route ==
Moga - Kot Ise Khan - Makhu - Harike - Bhikhiwind - Khalra.

== Junctions ==
- NH 703 in Moga
- NH 703A near Makhu
- NH 54 in Makhu
- NH 54 in Harike
- NH 354 in Bhikhiwind

== See also ==
- List of national highways in India
- List of national highways in India by state
