= Sidhwan Bet =

- Village
- Location in Punjab, India Sidhwan Bet (India)
- Coordinates: 31.371480°N 75.393681°E
- Country: India
- State: Punjab
- District: Ludhiana

Government
  - Type: Panchayati raj (India)
  - Body: Gram panchayat

Languages
  - Official: Punjabi
  - Other spoken: Hindi
- Time zone: UTC+5:30 (IST)
- PIN: 142033
- Telephone code: 01624
- ISO 3166 code: IN-PB
- Vehicle registration: PB-25

Sidhwan Bet is a village in Jagraon Tehsil in Ludhiana district of Punjab State, India. It is located 13 kilometres (8.1 mi) from Jagraon, The village is administrated by a Sarpanch who is an elected representative of village as per the constitution of India and Panchayati raj (India). It is situated near the famous Sutlej River to the north and the Sidhwan Canal to the south, both of which help to provide fertile land and a moderate living climate. The bridge at this location of Sutlej provides a convenient passage that connects the Malwa and the Doaba regions of Punjab. Sidhwan Bet is also a major hub that connects Nakodar to the north, Ludhiana to the west, Jagraon to the south and Dharamkot to the west.

== History ==
Before Sidhwan Bet was established there already existed a “village” (the real name is unknown) with a Hindu population. There is also a twin village named Salempura, which at that time was populated by Muslims. The “village” had four entry gates. Because Punjab at that time was under the control of Mughals, for security reasons the Hindu residents of the “village” used to lock these gates at nighttime.

In the early parts of the 1700s the downfall of the Mughal empire had begun, and the early roots of the Sikh empire began to spread throughout Punjab. Some Sikhs began moving out of their traditional strongholds and started to settle in different parts of Punjab, and this led to the founding of new villages in Punjab.

Two Sidhu ancestor brothers, Mita Singh and Bhaoo Singh, came to the “village” looking to acquire new land for agriculture. The Hindu residents of the “village” saw this as an opportunity for greater security to have Sikhs move there. The residents convinced the ancestor Sidhu brothers to settle there, and the ancestor brothers agreed to this, but on one condition; that the name of the “village” be changed to Sidhwan Bet. The Hindu residents agreed to this condition and, thus, began the history of Sidhwan Bet around the year 1750. “Sidhwan” means something belonging to Sidhus, while “Bet” refers to the type of soil in the area. The cousins of these ancestor Sidhu brothers are also believed to have established Sidhwan Kalan and Sidhwan Khurd at just about the same time.

Sidhwan Bet is divided into three main areas. The first area known as the “Shehar” (ਸ਼ਹਿਰ) is occupied by the descendants of the original Hindu “village” residents. Second is the area known as the Mita ward ( ਮਿੱਤਾ ਪੱਤੀ ) occupied by the descendants of Sardar Mita Singh Sidhu. Third is the area known as the Bhaoo ward (ਭਾਊ ਪੱਤੀ) occupied by the descendants of Sardar Bhaoo Singh Sidhu.

Mita Singh Sidhu had two sons; Hardas Singh and Gurdas Singh. Within the Mita ward there are two sub-wards known as Hardas “Tholla” (ਹਰਦਾਸ ਥੋਲਾ) and Gurdas “Tholla” (ਗੁਰਦਾਸ ਥੋਲਾ); each occupied by their respective descendants.

Bhaoo Singh Sidhu had three sons; Sangat Singh, Kahna Singh and Deewana Singh. Within the Bhaoo ward there are three sub-wards known as Sangat “Tholla” (ਸੰਗਤ ਥੋਲਾ), Kahna “Tholla” (ਕਾਹਨਾ ਥੋਲਾ) and Deewana “Tholla” (ਦੀਵਾਨਾ ਥੋਲਾ); each one occupied by their respective descendants.

Soon after Sidhwan Bet was first established, the ancestor Sidhu brothers also invited their Pannu and Boparai friends to move there. As a result, there are also small and separate areas occupied by residents with Pannu and Boparai surnames.

=== Government Facilities, Shopping and other Amenities ===
Sidhwan Bet is home to a sub-tehsil office, a police station, a civil hospital, a high school for boys, a high school for girls, a primary school boys, a primary school for girls, a Block Development and Panchayat Office, a post office, a dana mandi (wholesale grain market), an electricity sub-station and several banks.

Residents of many adjacent villages come to Sidhwan Bet for shopping and other services. The bazaar has lots of family-run retail shops such as green grocers, readymade clothing shops, loose fabric shops, hair and beauty parlors, general stores, and construction/renovation stores. There are many modern type restaurants as well as traditional dhabas. In addition to the hospital there are other medical facilities such as doctors, dentists and chemist shops.

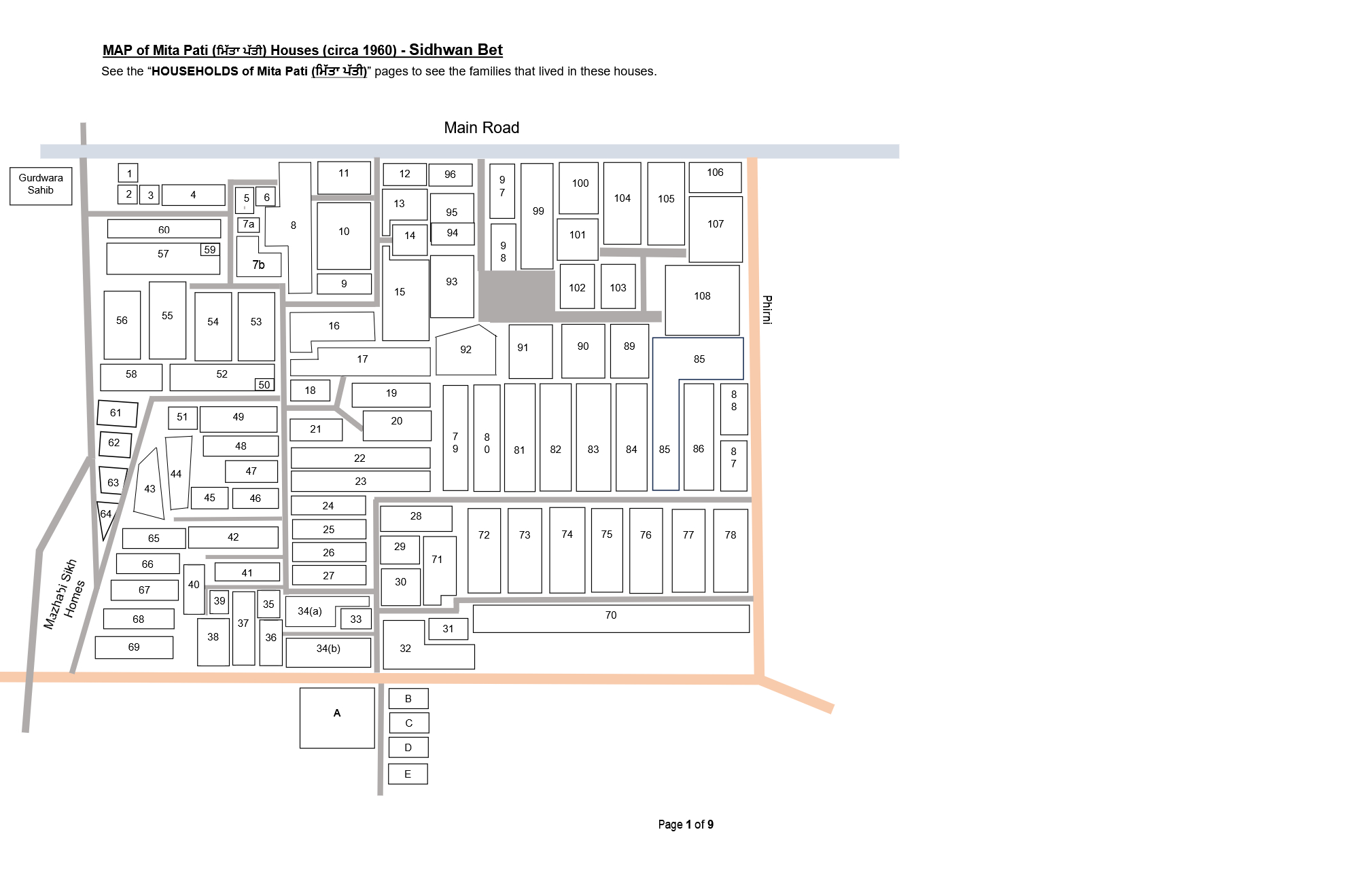
Layout of Mita Pati Houses

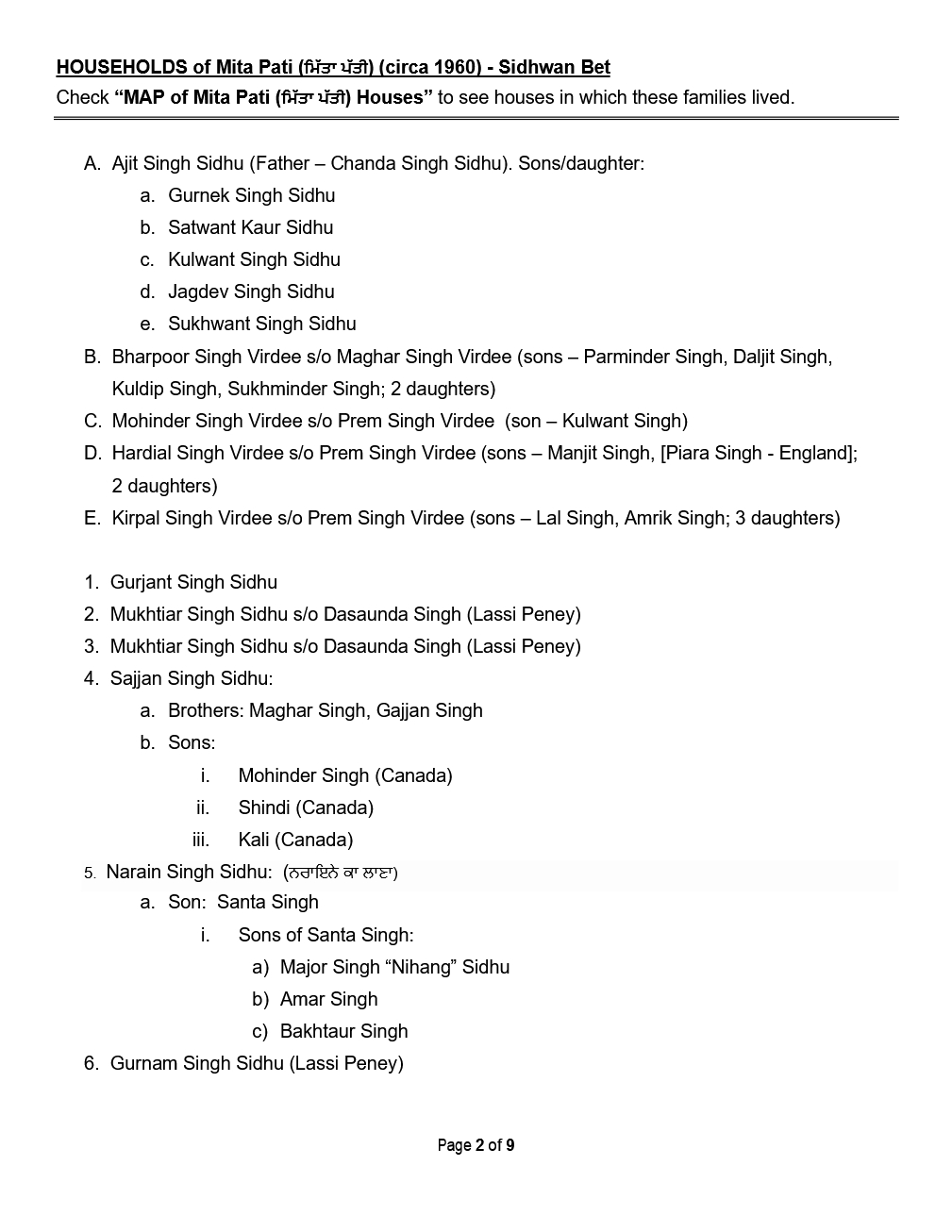
Families of Mita Pati_1

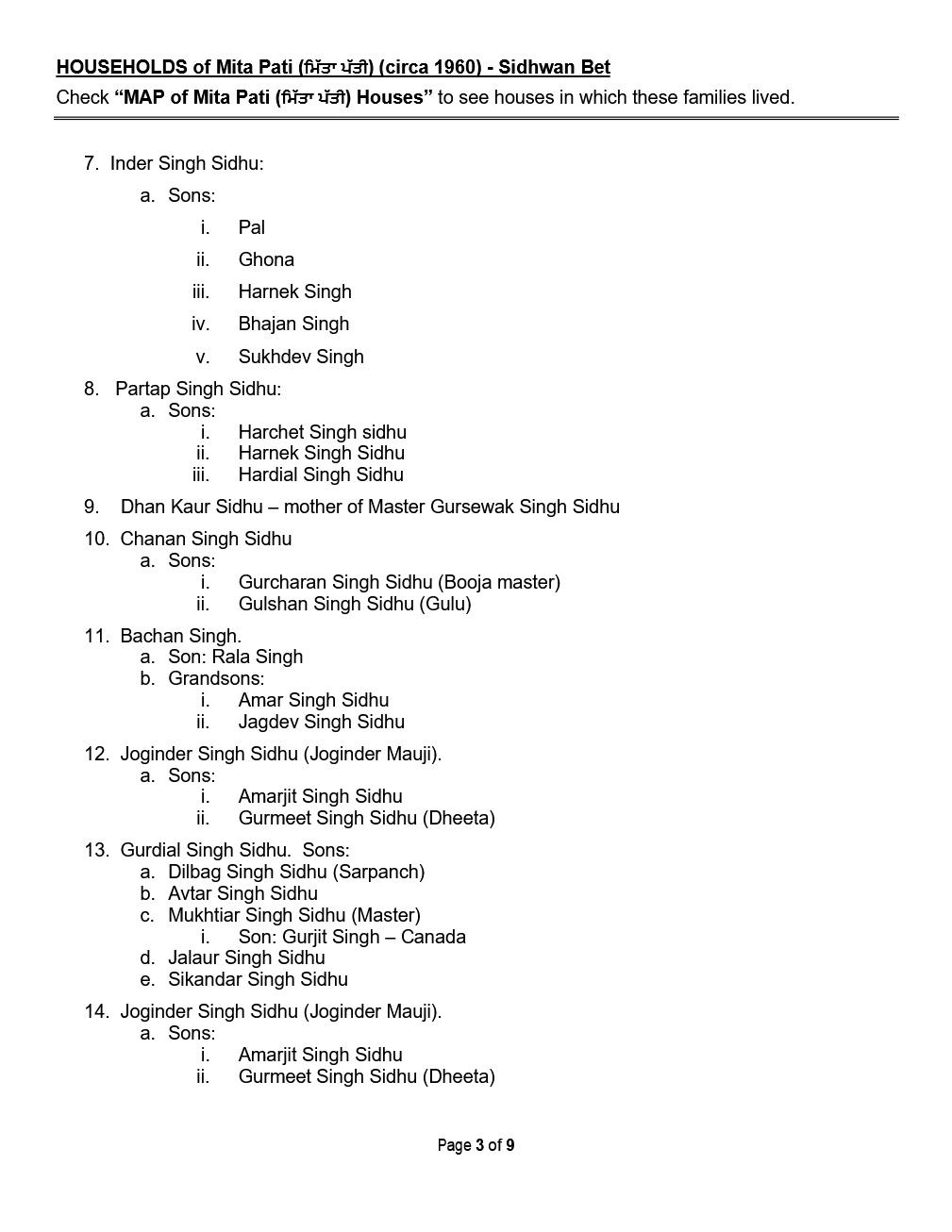
Families of Mita Pati_2

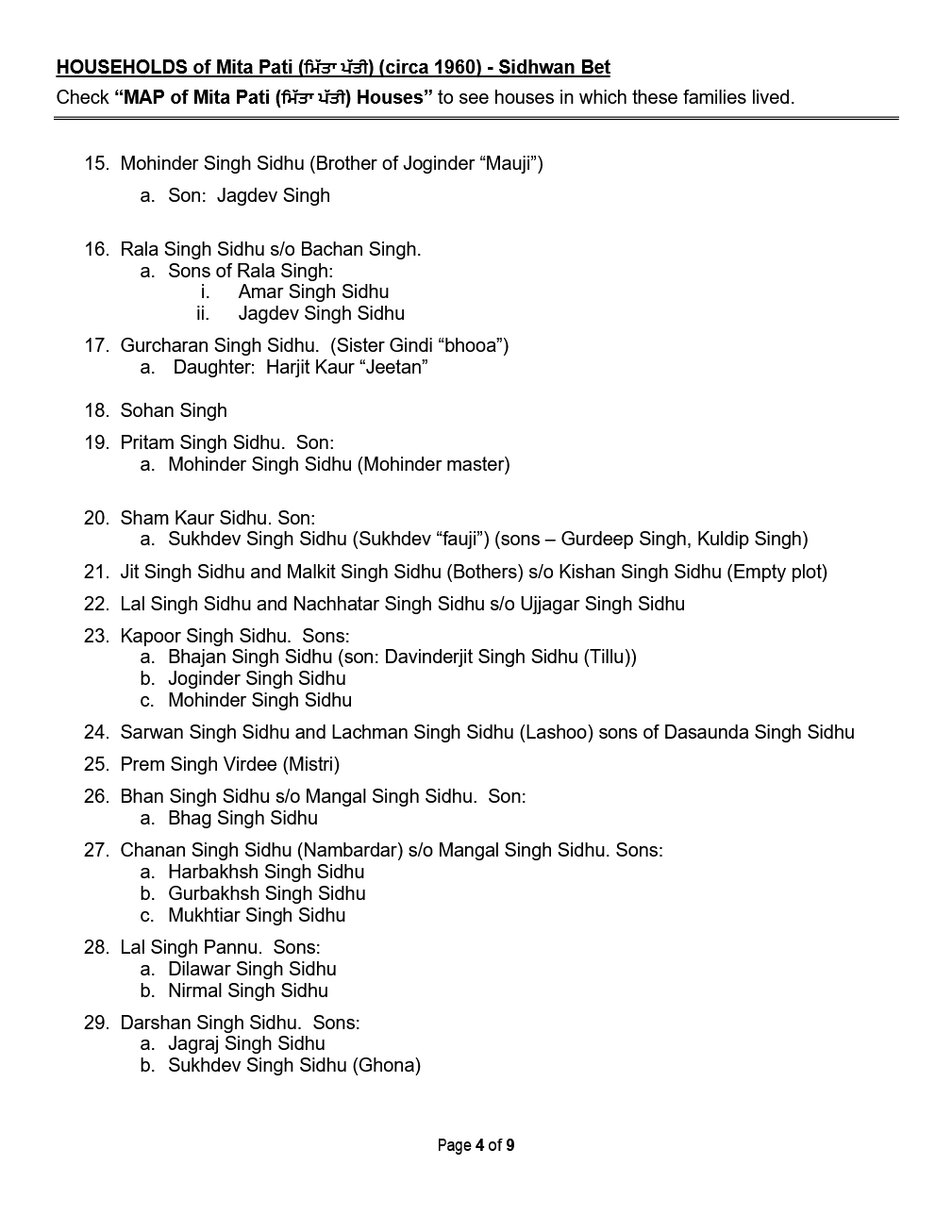
Families of Mita Pati_3

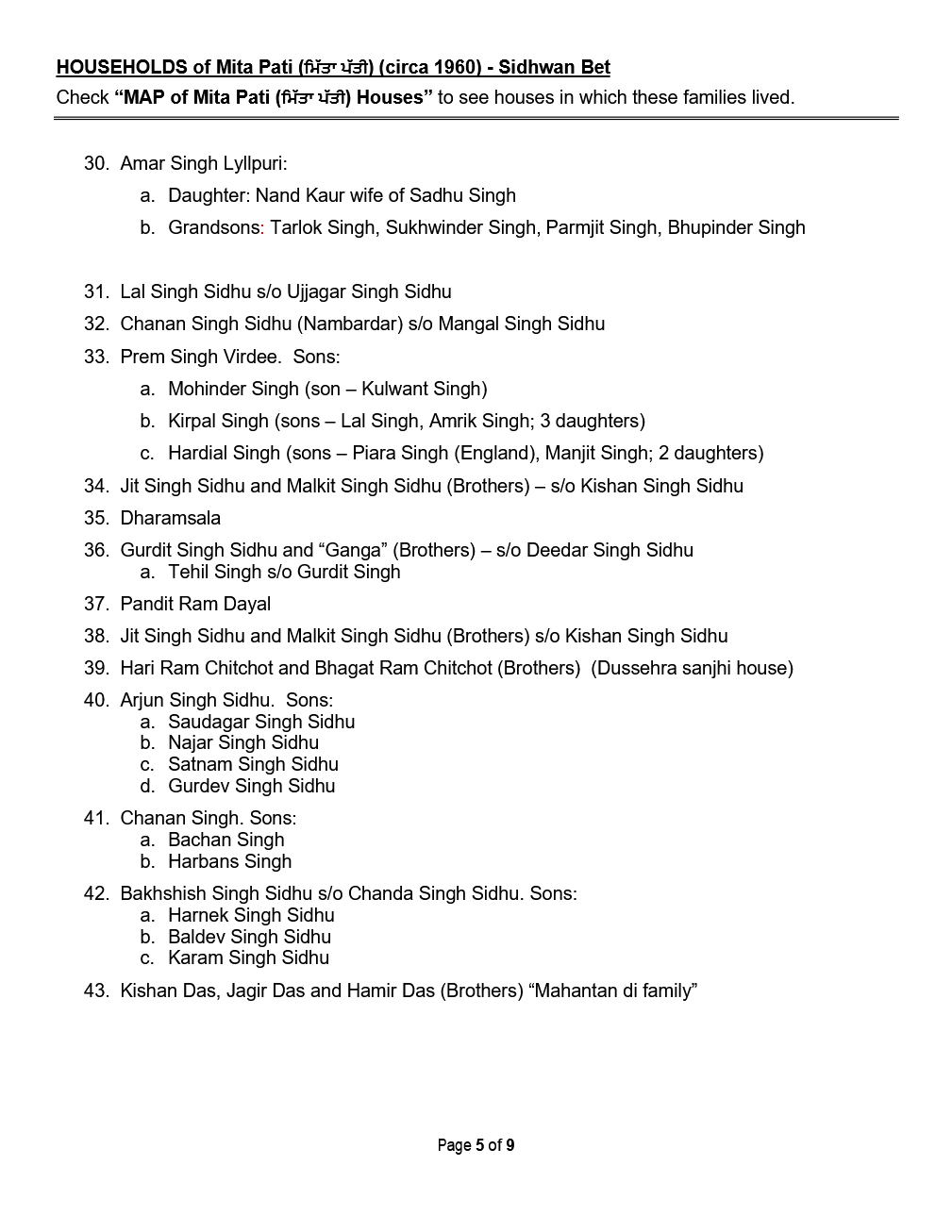
Families of Mita Pati_4

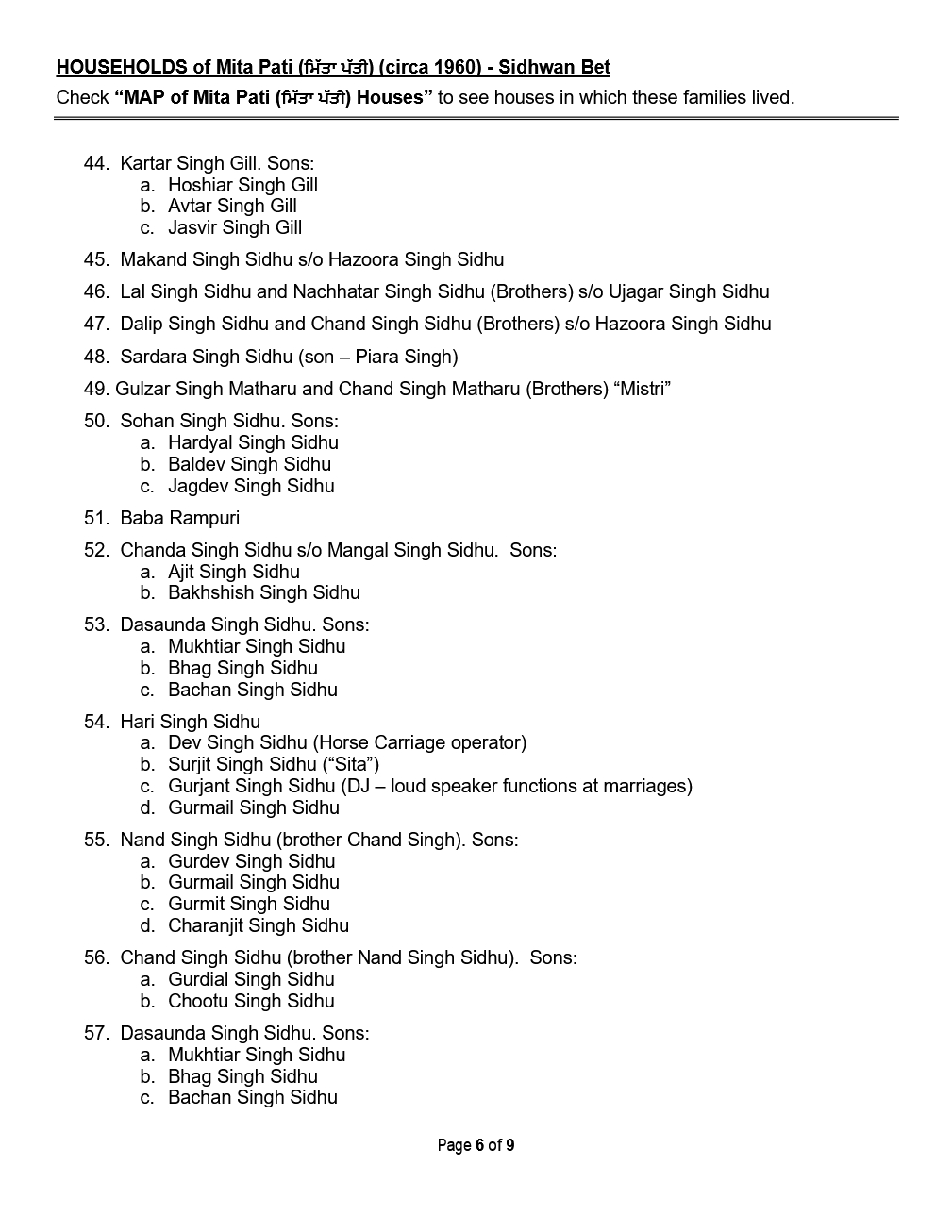
Families of Mita Pati_5

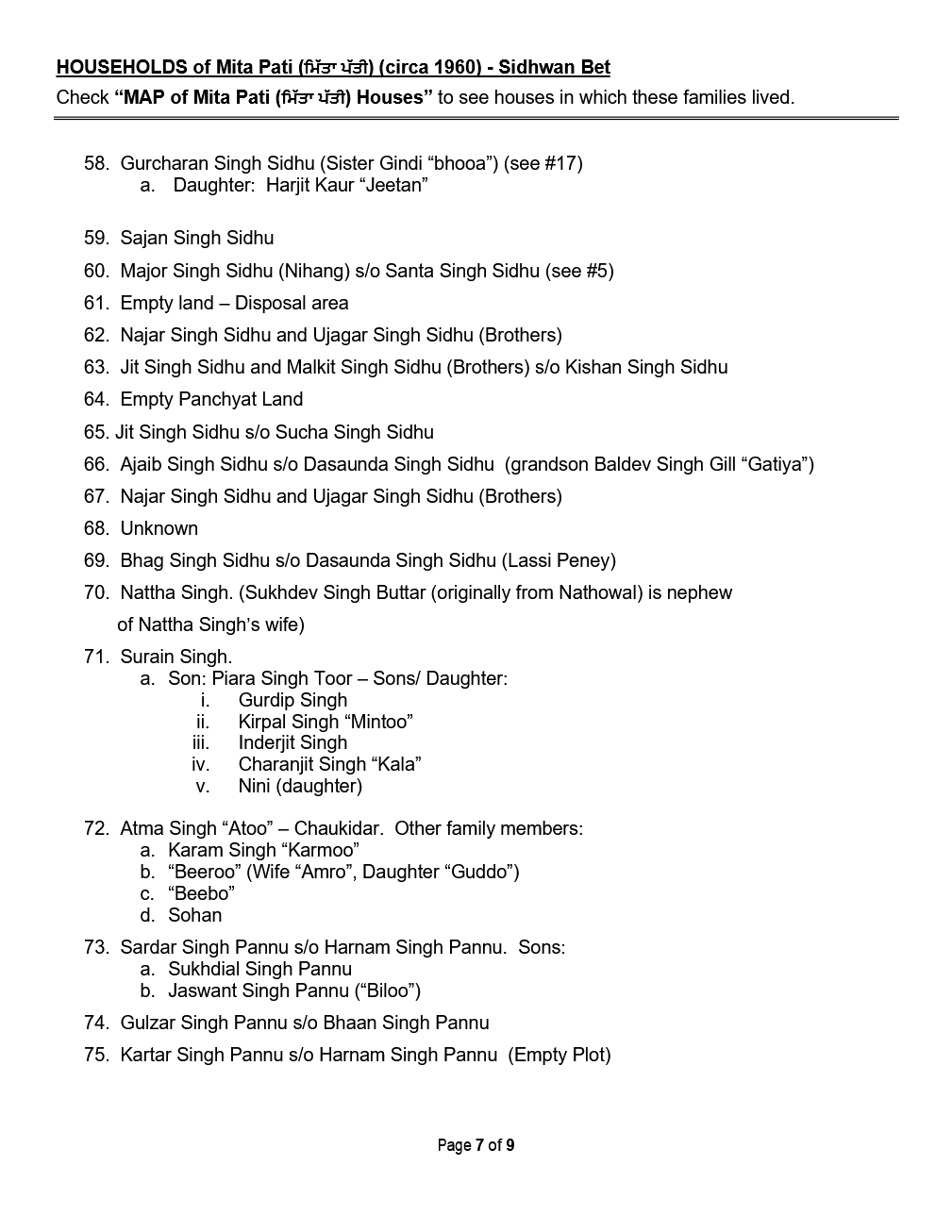
Families of Mita Pati_6

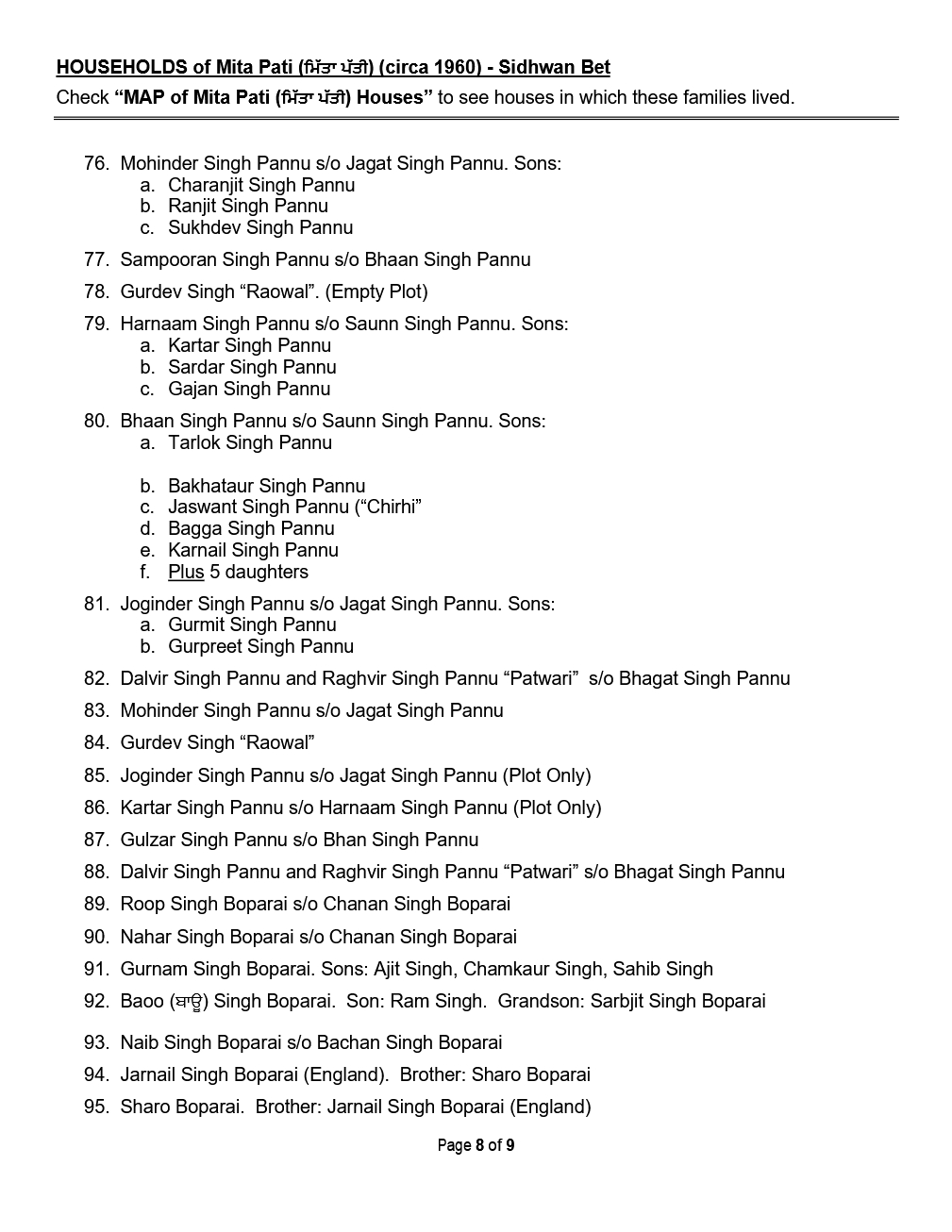
Families of Mita Pati_7

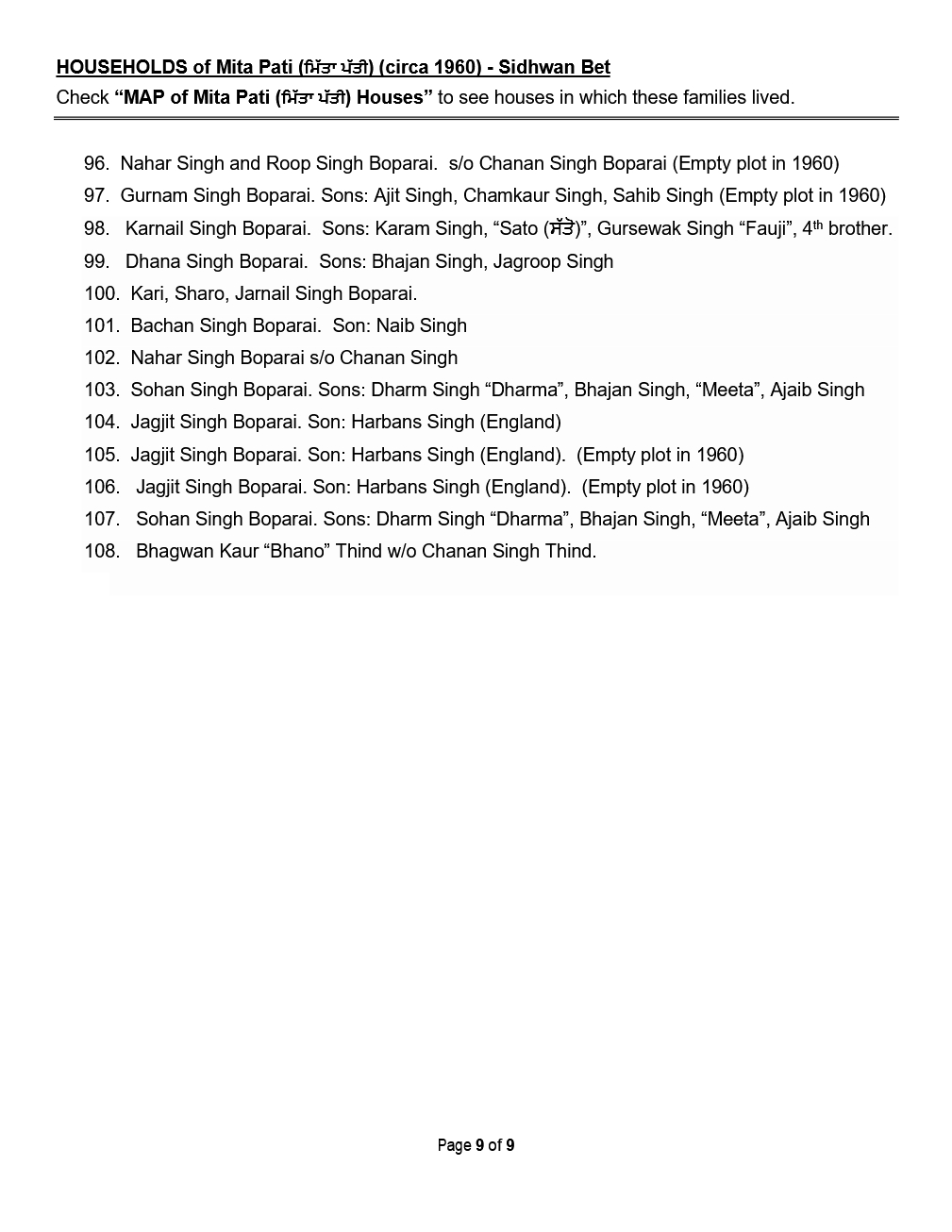
Families of Mita Pati_8
