= Makhu =

- Town
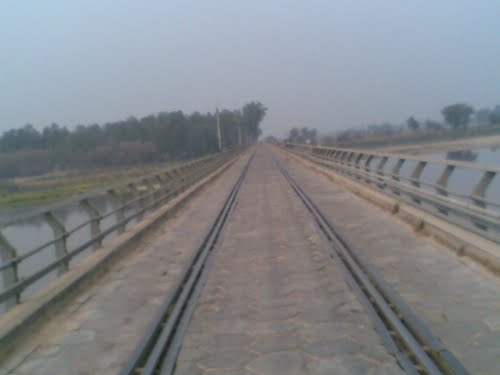
- Rail Road bridge near Makhu

- Location in Punjab, India Makhu (India)
- Coordinates: 31.1°N 75.0°E
- Country: India
- State: Punjab
- District: Ferozepur

Government
  - Type: Nagar Panchayat

Area
  - Total: 6 km^{2} (2.3 sq mi)
- Elevation: 201 m (659 ft)

Population (2011)
  - Total: 14,658
  - Density: 2,400/km^{2} (6,300/sq mi)

Languages
  - Official: Punjabi
- Time zone: UTC+5:30 (IST)
- PIN: 142044
- Telephone code: 01682
- Vehicle registration: PB 47

Makhu is a town and a nagar panchayat in Ferozepur district in Indian state of Punjab.

== Geography ==
Makhu has an average elevation of 201 metres (659 feet). This town is located near the edge of Harike Sanctuary. It is 5 km away from the confluence of Satluj and Beas rivers.

== Demographics ==
As of 2001 India census, Makhu had a population of 12,173. Males constitute 52% of the population and females 48%. Makhu has an average literacy rate of 88%, higher than the national average of 59.5%: male literacy is 87 percent, and female literacy is 89 percent In Makhu, 14% of the population is under 6 years of age.

The table below shows the population of different religious groups in Makhu town, as of 2011 census.

Population by religious groups in Makhu town, 2011 census
Religion	Total	Female	Male
Sikh	6,896	3,265	3,631
Hindu	5,740	2,695	3,045
Christian	1,943	947	996
Muslim	48	10	38
Buddhist	4	2	2
Other religions	1	1	0
Not stated	26	15	11
Total	14,658	6,935	7,723

== Politics ==
The town is a part of Zira Assembly Constituency, and Naresh Kataria is the MLA elected in 2022.

== Transport ==
Railway

The town has namesake Makhu Railway station which provides connectivity to major cities of Firozpur, Ludhiana and Jalandhar.

Road

Makhu is connected to rest of Punjab and nation through three national highways.

- National Highway 54 - Old NH 15
- National Highway 703A
- National Highway 703B

== Major Healthcare Services ==
- Kalra Hospital
- City Hospital Makhu
- Civil Hospital Makhu
- Medicare hospital
