= National Highway 703A (India) =

National highway in India

National Highway 703A
- Map of National Highway 703A in red

Route information
- Auxiliary route of NH 3
- Length: 101 km (63 mi)

Major junctions
- East end: Jalandhar
- West end: Arifke

Location
- Country: India
- States: Punjab
- Primary destinations: Kapurthala, Sultanpur Lodhi, Pindi, Makhu, mallanwala

Highway system
- Roads in India; Expressways; National; State; Asian
← NH 3	→ NH 354

National Highway 703A, commonly referred to as NH 703A, is a national highway in India. It is a spur road of National Highway 3. The 101-km NH 703A traverses the Indian state of Punjab.

== Route ==
Jalandhar - Kapurthala - Sultanpur Lodhi - Pindi - Makhu - Maluwalia Wala - Mallanwala - Ilmewala - Arifke

== Junctions ==
NH 3 Terminal near Jalandhar.
NH 703B near Makhu.
NH 54 near Makhu.
NH 354 Terminal near Arifke.

== See also ==
- List of national highways in India
- List of national highways in India by state
