= Malout =

- Town
- National Highway 9 in Malout, Muktsar district, Punjab, India

- Location in Punjab, India
- Coordinates: 30.190°N 74.499°E
- Country: India
- State: Punjab
- District: Muktsar

Government
  - Type: Municipal Council
  - Body: Malout Municipal Council

Population (2011)
  - Total: 81,406

Languages
  - Official: Hindi, Punjabi, Bagri
- Time zone: UTC+5:30 (IST)
- PIN: 152107
- Telephone code: 1637
- Vehicle registration: PB-53

Malout is a town, just outside of Muktsar Sahib city in the Muktsar district of the Indian state of Punjab. It is in the southern Punjab "cotton belt", where production per kilometer is one of the highest in India. Malout is on NH-354 and NH-9 and NH-7, which connects Fazilka to New Delhi. The boundaries of Haryana and Rajasthan are 30 kilometres (19 mi) and 65 kilometres (40 mi), respectively, from the town. Malout is 55 kilometres (34 mi) from the border with Pakistan, and has been affected by military incidents. Malout dates back several centuries and is closely associated with the Jaat Godara's (Chaudhary), who were among the earliest settlers and played a foundational role in establishing the town through their philanthropic contribution and influence leading to the major formation of Malout.

The name Malout is believed to derive from the words “Mal” (goods or wealth) and “Out” (outpost), reflecting its early role as a trading centre on the ancient route between Multan and Delhi during British Raj.”

== History ==
During British rule, in 1853, Chaudhary Nanaka Ram Godara of Lunkaransar (Bikaner) purchased approximately 4,800 acres of land from the British, then divided it among his sons; Sardara Ram Godara, Narayan Ram Godara, and Harji Ram Godara; who began agricultural and industrial development. When the railway station was planned around 1898, Chaudhary Nanaka Ram Godara is credited with donating land for its construction and the creation of a township.

The arrival of the Bathinda–Karachi railway line in 1917–18 accelerated urban formation. Chaudhary Harji Ram Godara, a major landholder, established a market near the station called Harji Ram Mandi, becoming a critical hub for regional commerce. The first three havelis in Malout were built by the Chaudhary families in 1918.

In 1919, local merchants from various other places led by Seth Thakar Das Ahuja approached Chaudhary Harji Ram to acquire plots which did not happen. Later, a seven-member committee purchased 200 acres from the Zamindar of Sheikhhu for ₹114,163.32. Shops and residences were laid out under this plan opposite to Chaudhary Harji Ram Mandi. On 19 March 1920, Malout was formally established, and on 17 November 1921 concurrent with the Prince of Wales's visit the market was renamed Edward Ganj, with the inauguration of a water purification system by district officials.

By the late 1940s, Malout had essential civic infrastructure, including a post office, telephone exchange, guest house, and cemetery. It also became renowned for its cotton production and agricultural machinery trade, earning the title Cotton capital of Punjab.

The Godara family continued to shape Malout's progress. Land near the railway station for government schools, a hospital, and several other public facilities was donated by the family, strengthening the town’s civic infrastructure. Chaudhary Surja Ram Godara, a philanthropist and Member of the Legislative Council (MLC), earned the regional nickname Cotton King for his industrial role all over India. His ventures, such as Ch. Surja Ram and Sons Ginning and Pressing Factory, solidified the town’s commercial importance in the textile sector. With cotton producers and the agricultural machinery industry, Malout and its nearby villages were known as the cotton capital of Punjab.

== Climate ==
The region's temperature varies widely by season. Summer temperatures reach 48–50 °C (118–122 °F), and winter temperatures fall to 1–2 °C (34–36 °F). The western Himalayas in the north and the Thar Desert in the south and southwest primarily determine the climate. The south-western monsoon brings nearly 70 percent of the annual rainfall from June to September. Most of the district has an arid (tropic) moisture regime, according to soil-classification criteria. Soil-moisture computations using the Newhall mathematical model indicate that the region has a "weak aridic" moisture regime (Van Wambeke, 1985).

== Political representation ==
Baljit Kaur, MLA of Malout Assembly Constituency, was elected in 2022.

== Commerce and industry ==
Municipal committee does not own any land or any place but despite than committee asks for annual rent of the shops near by area shops of Municipal committee. Legally committee has no right to ask any rent against any shop.

== Notable people ==
- Rohit Bansal, chief executive officer and co-founder of Snapdeal
- Kamalpreet Kaur, Indian Athlete
