= Bhikhiwind =

- Town
- Location in Punjab, India Bhikhiwind (India)
- Coordinates: 31°20′43″N 74°41′29″E
- Country: India
- State: Punjab
- District: Tarn Taran
- Region: Majha

Government
  - Type: Municipal corporation

Population (2001)
  - Total: 10,269

Languages
  - Official: Punjabi, Hindi
- Time zone: UTC+5:30 (IST)

Bhikhiwind is a town and a nagar panchayat, just about 33 km from Tarn Taran Sahib in Tarn Taran district in the Majha region of state of Punjab, India. The town is located along the India-Pakistan border, and is some 280 km from Chandigarh.

== History ==
The village is site of the historic 1965 India-Pakistan Battle of Asal Uttar in which Pakistan was comprehensively defeated and it still remains a world record or highest number for battle tanks destroyed in a single day as Indian Army had destroyed 97 Pakistani tanks on 10th September 1965.Bhikhiwind was known as Patton Nagar (also called "Patton City" or the "Graveyard of Pattons") is the nickname given to the battlefield area around and Bhikhiwind in the Tarn Taran district of Punjab, India.India destroyed or captured nearly 100 to nearly 170 Pakistani Patton tanks in one of the largest tank battles since World War II.The captured and disabled tanks were initially gathered and displayed near Bhikhiwind as war trophies, though many were later distributed to various Indian Army cantonments and establishments.[www.livehistoryindia.com]

== Geography ==
Bhikhiwind is located at 31.34°N 74.70°E.

== Demographics ==
As of 2001 Census of India, Bhikhiwind had a population of 10,269. Males constitute 53% of the population and females 47%. Bhikhiwind has an average literacy rate of 66%, higher than the national average of 59.5%; with the male literacy rate of 71% and female literacy rate of 60%. 14% of the population is under 6 years of age.

The table below shows the population of different religious groups in Bhikhiwind town and their gender ratio, as of 2011 census.

Population by religious groups in Bhikhiwind town, 2011 census
Religion	Total	Female	Male	Gender ratio
Sikh	14,609	6,958	7,651	909
Hindu	5,507	2,351	3,156	744
Christian	259	113	146	773
Muslim	120	49	71	690
Buddhist	2	1	1	1000
Not stated	29	16	13	1230
Total	20,526	9,488	11,038	859

== Transport ==
Air:

Sri Guru Ram Das Ji International Airport at Amritsar is 45 km to the north.

Rail:

Patti is the nearest railway station on the Amritsar-Patti-Khem Karan line, which is being extended from Patti to Mallanwala Khas as an additional direct link from Amritsar to Firozpur and Rajasthan via the under-construction 1,369 metres (4,491 ft) long rail-cum-road bridge on Sutlej River.

Road:

NH354 connects Bhikhiwind to Amritsar, Dera Baba Nanak and Gurdaspur to the north as well as to Khemkaran Firozpur, and Malout in the south.
NH703B connects Bhikhiwind to Taran Taran city (25 km) and Moga to the east as well as to Lahore in Pakistan to the west.

== See also ==
- Khemkaran
- Attari–Wagah border ceremony
