= Malhuwala =

Malhuwala may refer to:

- Malhuwala, Firozpur tehsil, a village in Firozpur tehsil of Punjab, India
- Malhuwala (34421), a village in Zira tehsil of Punjab, India
- Malhuwala (34397), a village in Zira tehsil of Punjab, India
