= Killi Gudha =

Killi Gudha Killi Godha
- village
- Location in Punjab, India Killi Gudha (India)
- Coordinates: 31.108°N 74.889°E
- Country: India
- State: Punjab
- District: Firozpur
- Tehsil: Zira
- Elevation: 208 m (682 ft)

Population (2011)
  - Total: 572
- Time zone: UTC+5:30 (IST)
- 2011 census code: 34304

Killi Gudha is a village in the Firozpur district of Punjab, India. It is located in the Zira tehsil.

== Demographics ==
According to the 2011 census of India, Killi Gudha has 107 households. The effective literacy rate (i.e. the literacy rate of population excluding children aged 6 and below) is 58.9%.

Demographics (2011 Census)
	Total	Male	Female
Population	572	297	275
Children aged below 6 years	61	33	28
Scheduled caste	0	0	0
Scheduled tribe	0	0	0
Literates	301	162	139
Workers (all)	193	185	8
Main workers (total)	191	183	8
Main workers: Cultivators	131	126	5
Main workers: Agricultural labourers	54	52	2
Main workers: Household industry workers	2	2	0
Main workers: Other	4	3	1
Marginal workers (total)	2	2	0
Marginal workers: Cultivators	2	2	0
Marginal workers: Agricultural labourers	0	0	0
Marginal workers: Household industry workers	0	0	0
Marginal workers: Others	0	0	0
Non-workers	379	112	267
