= Chak Tibbi Tayab =

- village
- Location in Punjab, India Chak Tibbi Tayab (India)
- Coordinates: 31.1265671°N 75.0932352°E
- Country: India
- State: Punjab
- District: Firozpur
- Tehsil: Zira
- Elevation: 208 m (682 ft)

Population (2011)
  - Total: 332
- Time zone: UTC+5:30 (IST)
- 2011 census code: 34239

Chak Tibbi Tayab is a village in the Firozpur district of Punjab, India. It is located in the Zira tehsil.

== Demographics ==
According to the 2011 census of India, Chak Tibbi Tayab has 44 households. The effective literacy rate (i.e. the literacy rate of population excluding children aged 6 and below) is 55.51%.

Demographics (2011 Census)
	Total	Male	Female
Population	332	165	167
Children aged below 6 years	60	32	28
Scheduled caste	269	134	135
Scheduled tribe	0	0	0
Literates	151	84	67
Workers (all)	89	80	9
Main workers (total)	89	80	9
Main workers: Cultivators	87	78	9
Main workers: Agricultural labourers	0	0	0
Main workers: Household industry workers	0	0	0
Main workers: Other	2	2	0
Marginal workers (total)	0	0	0
Marginal workers: Cultivators	0	0	0
Marginal workers: Agricultural labourers	0	0	0
Marginal workers: Household industry workers	0	0	0
Marginal workers: Others	0	0	0
Non-workers	243	85	158
