= Chakkian =

- village
- Location in Punjab, India Chakkian (India)
- Coordinates: 31.1104134°N 75.0427116°E
- Country: India
- State: Punjab
- District: Firozpur
- Tehsil: Zira
- Elevation: 210 m (690 ft)

Population (2011)
  - Total: 1,050
- Time zone: UTC+5:30 (IST)
- 2011 census code: 34275

Chakkian is a village in the Firozpur district of Punjab, India. It is located in the Zira tehsil.

== Demographics ==
According to the 2011 census of India, Chakkian has 210 households. The effective literacy rate (i.e. the literacy rate of population excluding children aged 6 and below) is 61.46%.

Demographics (2011 Census)
	Total	Male	Female
Population	1050	543	507
Children aged below 6 years	147	85	62
Scheduled caste	690	355	335
Scheduled tribe	0	0	0
Literates	555	314	241
Workers (all)	398	309	89
Main workers (total)	312	278	34
Main workers: Cultivators	152	149	3
Main workers: Agricultural labourers	103	92	11
Main workers: Household industry workers	5	5	0
Main workers: Other	52	32	20
Marginal workers (total)	86	31	55
Marginal workers: Cultivators	5	2	3
Marginal workers: Agricultural labourers	57	13	44
Marginal workers: Household industry workers	7	2	5
Marginal workers: Others	17	14	3
Non-workers	652	234	418
