= Amir Shahwala =

- village
- Location in Punjab, India Amir Shahwala (India)
- Coordinates: 31.0853101°N 75.0757157°E
- Country: India
- State: Punjab
- District: Firozpur
- Tehsil: Zira
- Elevation: 210 m (690 ft)

Population (2011)
  - Total: 680
- Time zone: UTC+5:30 (IST)
- 2011 census code: 34247

Amir Shahwala is a village in the Firozpur district of Punjab, India. It is located in the Zira tehsil.

== Demographics ==
According to the 2011 census of India, Amir Shahwala has 110 households. The effective literacy rate (i.e. the literacy rate of population excluding children aged 6 and below) is 59.31%.

Demographics (2011 Census)
	Total	Male	Female
Population	680	351	329
Children aged below 6 years	100	56	44
Scheduled caste	450	226	224
Scheduled tribe	0	0	0
Literates	344	205	139
Workers (all)	222	194	28
Main workers (total)	222	194	28
Main workers: Cultivators	65	64	1
Main workers: Agricultural labourers	94	73	21
Main workers: Household industry workers	1	1	0
Main workers: Other	62	56	6
Marginal workers (total)	0	0	0
Marginal workers: Cultivators	0	0	0
Marginal workers: Agricultural labourers	0	0	0
Marginal workers: Household industry workers	0	0	0
Marginal workers: Others	0	0	0
Non-workers	458	157	301
