= Wariswala Jattan =

- village
- Location in Punjab, India Wariswala Jattan (India)
- Coordinates: 31.0585792°N 75.053906°E
- Country: India
- State: Punjab
- District: Firozpur
- Tehsil: Zira
- Elevation: 211 m (692 ft)

Population (2011)
  - Total: 684
- Time zone: UTC+5:30 (IST)
- 2011 census code: 34251

Wariswala Jattan is a village in the Firozpur district of Punjab, India. It is located in the Zira tehsil.

== Demographics ==
According to the 2011 census of India, Wariswala Jattan has 145 households. The effective literacy rate (i.e. the literacy rate of population excluding children aged 6 and below) is 67.61%.

Demographics (2011 Census)
	Total	Male	Female
Population	684	361	323
Children aged below 6 years	82	46	36
Scheduled caste	294	155	139
Scheduled tribe	0	0	0
Literates	407	230	177
Workers (all)	238	227	11
Main workers (total)	232	221	11
Main workers: Cultivators	96	95	1
Main workers: Agricultural labourers	108	106	2
Main workers: Household industry workers	1	1	0
Main workers: Other	27	19	8
Marginal workers (total)	6	6	0
Marginal workers: Cultivators	3	3	0
Marginal workers: Agricultural labourers	3	3	0
Marginal workers: Household industry workers	0	0	0
Marginal workers: Others	0	0	0
Non-workers	446	134	312
