= Tibbi Rang =

- village
- Location in Punjab, India Tibbi Rang (India)
- Coordinates: 31.118904°N 75.0757157°E
- Country: India
- State: Punjab
- District: Firozpur
- Tehsil: Zira
- Elevation: 209 m (686 ft)

Population (2011)
  - Total: 165
- Time zone: UTC+5:30 (IST)
- 2011 census code: 34260

Tibbi Rang is a village in the Firozpur district of Punjab, India. It is located in the Zira tehsil.

== Demographics ==
According to the 2011 census of India, Tibbi Rang has 31 households. The effective literacy rate (i.e. the literacy rate of population excluding children aged 6 and below) is 55.8%.

Demographics (2011 Census)
	Total	Male	Female
Population	165	91	74
Children aged below 6 years	27	18	9
Scheduled caste	128	69	59
Scheduled tribe	0	0	0
Literates	77	41	36
Workers (all)	67	48	19
Main workers (total)	53	40	13
Main workers: Cultivators	21	19	2
Main workers: Agricultural labourers	28	18	10
Main workers: Household industry workers	0	0	0
Main workers: Other	4	3	1
Marginal workers (total)	14	8	6
Marginal workers: Cultivators	0	0	0
Marginal workers: Agricultural labourers	13	8	5
Marginal workers: Household industry workers	1	0	1
Marginal workers: Others	0	0	0
Non-workers	98	43	55
