= Aminwala =

- village
- Location in Punjab, India Aminwala (India)
- Coordinates: 31.0956785°N 75.0411423°E
- Country: India
- State: Punjab
- District: Firozpur
- Tehsil: Zira
- Elevation: 210 m (690 ft)

Population (2011)
  - Total: 465
- Time zone: UTC+5:30 (IST)
- 2011 census code: 34253

Aminwala is a village in the Firozpur district of Punjab, India. It is located in the Zira tehsil.

== Demographics ==
According to the 2011 census of India, Aminwala has 88 households. The effective literacy rate (i.e. the literacy rate of population excluding children aged 6 and below) is 66.1%.

Demographics (2011 Census)
	Total	Male	Female
Population	465	250	215
Children aged below 6 years	52	30	22
Scheduled caste	92	46	46
Scheduled tribe	0	0	0
Literates	273	164	109
Workers (all)	145	136	9
Main workers (total)	111	104	7
Main workers: Cultivators	101	97	4
Main workers: Agricultural labourers	0	0	0
Main workers: Household industry workers	1	1	0
Main workers: Other	9	6	3
Marginal workers (total)	34	32	2
Marginal workers: Cultivators	1	1	0
Marginal workers: Agricultural labourers	32	31	1
Marginal workers: Household industry workers	0	0	0
Marginal workers: Others	1	0	1
Non-workers	320	114	206
