= Chak Khanna =

- village
- Location in Punjab, India Chak Khanna (India)
- Coordinates: 31.0914925°N 75.1282683°E
- Country: India
- State: Punjab
- District: Firozpur
- Tehsil: Zira
- Elevation: 211 m (692 ft)

Population (2011)
  - Total: 159
- Time zone: UTC+5:30 (IST)
- 2011 census code: 34232

Chak Khanna is a village in the Firozpur district of Punjab, India. It is located in the Zira tehsil.

== Demographics ==
According to the 2011 census of India, Chak Khanna has 33 households. The effective literacy rate (i.e. the literacy rate of population excluding children aged 6 and below) is 47.66%.

Demographics (2011 Census)
	Total	Male	Female
Population	159	87	72
Children aged below 6 years	31	19	12
Scheduled caste	25	11	14
Scheduled tribe	0	0	0
Literates	61	34	27
Workers (all)	50	47	3
Main workers (total)	50	47	3
Main workers: Cultivators	45	43	2
Main workers: Agricultural labourers	2	2	0
Main workers: Household industry workers	0	0	0
Main workers: Other	3	2	1
Marginal workers (total)	0	0	0
Marginal workers: Cultivators	0	0	0
Marginal workers: Agricultural labourers	0	0	0
Marginal workers: Household industry workers	0	0	0
Marginal workers: Others	0	0	0
Non-workers	109	40	69
