= Ashieke =

Ashieke Asiake
- village
- Location in Punjab, India Ashieke (India)
- Coordinates: 31.1036828°N 74.8512884°E
- Country: India
- State: Punjab
- District: Firozpur
- Tehsil: Zira
- Elevation: 203 m (666 ft)

Population (2011)
  - Total: 882
- Time zone: UTC+5:30 (IST)
- 2011 census code: 34302

Ashieke is a village in the Firozpur district of Punjab, India. It is located in the Zira tehsil.

== Demographics ==
According to the 2011 census of India, Ashieke has 174 households. The effective literacy rate (i.e. the literacy rate of population excluding children aged 6 and below) is 69.24%.

Demographics (2011 Census)
	Total	Male	Female
Population	882	468	414
Children aged below 6 years	105	58	47
Scheduled caste	152	83	69
Scheduled tribe	0	0	0
Literates	538	326	212
Workers (all)	247	229	18
Main workers (total)	234	218	16
Main workers: Cultivators	208	195	13
Main workers: Agricultural labourers	4	4	0
Main workers: Household industry workers	0	0	0
Main workers: Other	22	19	3
Marginal workers (total)	13	11	2
Marginal workers: Cultivators	2	2	0
Marginal workers: Agricultural labourers	1	1	0
Marginal workers: Household industry workers	0	0	0
Marginal workers: Others	10	8	2
Non-workers	635	239	396
