= Sharaf Ali Shahwala =

- village
- Location in Punjab, India Sharaf Ali Shahwala (India)
- Coordinates: 31.0679171°N 75.1063735°E
- Country: India
- State: Punjab
- District: Firozpur
- Tehsil: Zira
- Elevation: 211 m (692 ft)

Population (2011)
  - Total: 468
- Time zone: UTC+5:30 (IST)
- 2011 census code: 34228

Sharaf Ali Shahwala is a village in the Firozpur district of Punjab, India. It is located in the Zira tehsil.

== Demographics ==
According to the 2011 census of India, Sharaf Ali Shahwala has 81 households. The effective literacy rate (i.e. the literacy rate of population excluding children aged 6 and below) is 53.66%.

Demographics (2011 Census)
	Total	Male	Female
Population	468	244	224
Children aged below 6 years	58	30	28
Scheduled caste	306	153	153
Scheduled tribe	0	0	1
Literates	220	131	89
Workers (all)	166	131	35
Main workers (total)	166	131	35
Main workers: Cultivators	51	50	1
Main workers: Agricultural labourers	110	76	34
Main workers: Household industry workers	3	3	0
Main workers: Other	2	2	0
Marginal workers (total)	0	0	0
Marginal workers: Cultivators	0	0	0
Marginal workers: Agricultural labourers	0	0	0
Marginal workers: Household industry workers	0	0	0
Marginal workers: Others	0	0	0
Non-workers	302	113	189
