= Mubarewala =

- village
- Location in Punjab, India Mubarewala (India)
- Coordinates: 31.0680164°N 75.0596545°E
- Country: India
- State: Punjab
- District: Firozpur
- Tehsil: Zira
- Elevation: 210 m (690 ft)

Population (2011)
  - Total: 105
- Time zone: UTC+5:30 (IST)
- 2011 census code: 34250

Mubarewala is a village in the Firozpur district of Punjab, India. It is located in the Zira tehsil.

== Demographics ==
According to the 2011 census of India, Mubarewala has 21 households. The effective literacy rate (i.e. the literacy rate of population excluding children aged 6 and below) is 76%.

Demographics (2011 Census)
| | Total | Male | Female |
|---|---|---|---|
| Population | 105 | 60 | 45 |
| Children aged below 6 years | 5 | 4 | 1 |
| Scheduled caste | 6 | 5 | 1 |
| Scheduled tribe | 0 | 0 | 0 |
| Literates | 76 | 48 | 28 |
| Workers (all) | 39 | 39 | 0 |
| Main workers (total) | 39 | 39 | 0 |
| Main workers: Cultivators | 30 | 30 | 0 |
| Main workers: Agricultural labourers | 3 | 3 | 0 |
| Main workers: Household industry workers | 0 | 0 | 0 |
| Main workers: Other | 6 | 6 | 0 |
| Marginal workers (total) | 0 | 0 | 0 |
| Marginal workers: Cultivators | 0 | 0 | 0 |
| Marginal workers: Agricultural labourers | 0 | 0 | 0 |
| Marginal workers: Household industry workers | 0 | 0 | 0 |
| Marginal workers: Others | 0 | 0 | 0 |
| Non-workers | 66 | 21 | 45 |
