= Tibbi Badra =

- village
- Location in Punjab, India Tibbi Badra (India)
- Coordinates: 31.1146823°N 75.0873956°E
- Country: India
- State: Punjab
- District: Firozpur
- Tehsil: Zira
- Elevation: 209 m (686 ft)

Population (2011)
  - Total: 59
- Time zone: UTC+5:30 (IST)
- 2011 census code: 34241

Tibbi Badra is a village in the Firozpur district of Punjab, India. It is located in the Zira tehsil.

== Demographics ==
According to the 2011 census of India, Tibbi Badra has 7 households. The effective literacy rate (i.e. the literacy rate of population excluding children aged 6 and below) is 75%.

Demographics (2011 Census)
	Total	Male	Female
Population	59	27	32
Children aged below 6 years	7	2	5
Scheduled caste	49	24	25
Scheduled tribe	0	0	0
Literates	39	22	17
Workers (all)	17	17	0
Main workers (total)	17	17	0
Main workers: Cultivators	12	12	0
Main workers: Agricultural labourers	0	0	0
Main workers: Household industry workers	0	0	0
Main workers: Other	5	5	0
Marginal workers (total)	0	0	0
Marginal workers: Cultivators	0	0	0
Marginal workers: Agricultural labourers	0	0	0
Marginal workers: Household industry workers	0	0	0
Marginal workers: Others	0	0	0
Non-workers	42	10	32
