= Mashieke =

Mashieke Masiake
- village
- Location in Punjab, India Mashieke (India)
- Coordinates: 31.0993178°N 74.8390431°E
- Country: India
- State: Punjab
- District: Firozpur
- Tehsil: Zira
- Elevation: 204 m (669 ft)

Population (2011)
  - Total: 664
- Time zone: UTC+5:30 (IST)
- 2011 census code: 34301

Mashieke is a village in the Firozpur district of Punjab, India. It is located in the Zira tehsil.

== Demographics ==
According to the 2011 census of India, Mashieke has 112 households. The effective literacy rate (i.e. the literacy rate of population excluding children aged 6 and below) is 62.97%.

Demographics (2011 Census)
| | Total | Male | Female |
|---|---|---|---|
| Population | 664 | 353 | 311 |
| Children aged below 6 years | 78 | 39 | 39 |
| Scheduled caste | 162 | 81 | 81 |
| Scheduled tribe | 0 | 0 | 0 |
| Literates | 369 | 214 | 155 |
| Workers (all) | 235 | 219 | 16 |
| Main workers (total) | 231 | 217 | 14 |
| Main workers: Cultivators | 192 | 182 | 10 |
| Main workers: Agricultural labourers | 32 | 30 | 2 |
| Main workers: Household industry workers | 0 | 0 | 0 |
| Main workers: Other | 7 | 5 | 2 |
| Marginal workers (total) | 4 | 2 | 2 |
| Marginal workers: Cultivators | 0 | 0 | 0 |
| Marginal workers: Agricultural labourers | 1 | 0 | 1 |
| Marginal workers: Household industry workers | 0 | 0 | 0 |
| Marginal workers: Others | 3 | 2 | 1 |
| Non-workers | 429 | 134 | 295 |
