= Mundi Chhurimaran =

- village
- Location in Punjab, India Mundi Chhurimaran (India)
- Coordinates: 31.0929734°N 75.0932352°E
- Country: India
- State: Punjab
- District: Firozpur
- Tehsil: Zira
- Elevation: 210 m (690 ft)

Population (2011)
  - Total: 2,267
- Time zone: UTC+5:30 (IST)
- 2011 census code: 34245

Mundi Chhurimaran is a village in the Firozpur district of Punjab, India. It is located in the Zira tehsil.

== Demographics ==
According to the 2011 census of India, Mundi Chhurimaran has 419 households. The effective literacy rate (i.e. the literacy rate of population excluding children aged 6 and below) is 63.78%.

Demographics (2011 Census)
	Total	Male	Female
Population	2267	1149	1118
Children aged below 6 years	340	183	157
Scheduled caste	2162	1088	1074
Scheduled tribe	0	0	0
Literates	1229	708	521
Workers (all)	614	567	47
Main workers (total)	606	560	46
Main workers: Cultivators	238	229	9
Main workers: Agricultural labourers	269	247	22
Main workers: Household industry workers	9	7	2
Main workers: Other	90	77	13
Marginal workers (total)	8	7	1
Marginal workers: Cultivators	1	1	0
Marginal workers: Agricultural labourers	6	5	1
Marginal workers: Household industry workers	0	0	0
Marginal workers: Others	1	1	0
Non-workers	1653	582	1071
