= Sirhali =

Sirhali Sarhali
- village
- Location in Punjab, India Sirhali (India)
- Coordinates: 31.09909986°N 74.91491318°E
- Country: India
- State: Punjab
- District: Firozpur
- Tehsil: Zira
- Elevation: 207 m (679 ft)

Population (2011)
  - Total: 1,059
- Time zone: UTC+5:30 (IST)
- 2011 census code: 34291

Sirhali, also known as Sarhali, is a village in the Firozpur district of Punjab, India. It is located in the Zira tehsil.

== Demographics ==
According to the 2011 census of India, Sirhali has 196 households. The effective literacy rate (i.e. the literacy rate of population excluding children aged 6 and below) is 68.7%.

Demographics (2011 Census)
	Total	Male	Female
Population	1059	580	479
Children aged below 6 years	126	80	46
Scheduled caste	265	151	114
Scheduled tribe	0	0	0
Literates	641	374	267
Workers (all)	383	297	86
Main workers (total)	196	189	7
Main workers: Cultivators	164	161	3
Main workers: Agricultural labourers	1	1	0
Main workers: Household industry workers	1	1	0
Main workers: Other	30	26	4
Marginal workers (total)	187	108	79
Marginal workers: Cultivators	15	5	10
Marginal workers: Agricultural labourers	105	79	26
Marginal workers: Household industry workers	47	10	37
Marginal workers: Others	20	14	6
Non-workers	676	283	393
