= Kot Qaim Khan =

- village
- Location in Punjab, India Kot Qaim Khan (India)
- Coordinates: 31.1350818°N 75.0231457°E
- Country: India
- State: Punjab
- District: Firozpur
- Tehsil: Zira
- Elevation: 210 m (690 ft)

Population (2011)
  - Total: 61
- Time zone: UTC+5:30 (IST)
- 2011 census code: 34273

Kot Qaim Khan is a village in the Zira tehsil the Firozpur district of Punjab, India.

== Demographics ==
According to the 2011 Census of India, Kot Qaim Khan had 13 households. The effective literacy rate (i.e. the literacy rate of the population excluding children aged 6 and below) was 60.71%.

Demographics (2011 Census)
	Total	Male	Female
Population	61	35	26
Children aged below 6 years	5	4	1
Scheduled caste	0	0	0
Scheduled tribe	0	0	0
Literates	34	19	15
Workers (all)	23	20	3
Main workers (total)	20	19	1
Main workers: Cultivators	19	18	1
Main workers: Agricultural labourers	0	0	0
Main workers: Household industry workers	0	0	0
Main workers: Other	1	1	0
Marginal workers (total)	3	1	2
Marginal workers: Cultivators	2	1	1
Marginal workers: Agricultural labourers	0	0	0
Marginal workers: Household industry workers	0	0	0
Marginal workers: Others	1	0	1
Non-workers	38	15	23
