= Akbarwala =

- village
- Location in Punjab, India Akbarwala (India)
- Coordinates: 31.100832°N 75.1005344°E
- Country: India
- State: Punjab
- District: Firozpur
- Tehsil: Zira
- Elevation: 209 m (686 ft)

Population (2011)
  - Total: 528
- Time zone: UTC+5:30 (IST)
- 2011 census code: 34237

Akbarwala is a village in the Firozpur district of Punjab, India. It is located in the Zira tehsil.

== Demographics ==
According to the 2011 census of India, Akbarwala has 100 households. The effective literacy rate (i.e. the literacy rate of population excluding children aged 6 and below) is 61.52%.

Demographics (2011 Census)
	Total	Male	Female
Population	528	262	266
Children aged below 6 years	81	37	44
Scheduled caste	487	245	242
Scheduled tribe	0	0	0
Literates	275	159	116
Workers (all)	118	115	3
Main workers (total)	98	95	3
Main workers: Cultivators	28	27	1
Main workers: Agricultural labourers	57	56	1
Main workers: Household industry workers	0	0	0
Main workers: Other	13	12	1
Marginal workers (total)	20	20	0
Marginal workers: Cultivators	2	2	0
Marginal workers: Agricultural labourers	18	18	0
Marginal workers: Household industry workers	0	0	0
Marginal workers: Others	0	0	0
Non-workers	410	147	263
