= Jogewala =

- village
- Location in Punjab, India Jogewala (India)
- Coordinates: 30.8330387°N 75.015843°E
- Country: India
- State: Punjab
- District: Firozpur
- Tehsil: Zira
- Elevation: 212 m (696 ft)

Population (2011)
  - Total: 2,079
- Time zone: UTC+5:30 (IST)
- 2011 census code: 34255

Jogewala is a village in the Firozpur district of Punjab, India. It is located in the Zira tehsil.

== Demographics ==
According to the 2011 census of India, Jogewala has 421 households. The effective literacy rate (i.e. the literacy rate of population excluding children aged 6 and below) is 64.38%.

Demographics (2011 Census)
	Total	Male	Female
Population	2079	1072	1007
Children aged below 6 years	274	156	118
Scheduled caste	605	303	302
Scheduled tribe	0	0	0
Literates	1162	647	515
Workers (all)	636	574	62
Main workers (total)	573	538	35
Main workers: Cultivators	262	250	12
Main workers: Agricultural labourers	204	195	9
Main workers: Household industry workers	6	6	0
Main workers: Other	101	87	14
Marginal workers (total)	63	36	27
Marginal workers: Cultivators	8	8	0
Marginal workers: Agricultural labourers	53	27	26
Marginal workers: Household industry workers	0	0	0
Marginal workers: Others	2	1	1
Non-workers	1443	498	945
