= Tibbi Ranga =

- village
- Location in Punjab, India Tibbi Ranga (India)
- Coordinates: 31.118904°N 75.0757157°E
- Country: India
- State: Punjab
- District: Firozpur
- Tehsil: Zira
- Elevation: 209 m (686 ft)

Population (2011)
  - Total: 352
- Time zone: UTC+5:30 (IST)
- 2011 census code: 34261

Tibbi Ranga is a village in the Firozpur district of Punjab, India. It is located in the Zira tehsil.

== Demographics ==
According to the 2011 census of India, Tibbi Ranga has 72 households. The effective literacy rate (i.e. the literacy rate of population excluding children aged 6 and below) is 56.12%.

Demographics (2011 Census)
	Total	Male	Female
Population	352	181	171
Children aged below 6 years	58	28	30
Scheduled caste	330	169	161
Scheduled tribe	0	0	0
Literates	165	101	64
Workers (all)	104	93	11
Main workers (total)	81	78	3
Main workers: Cultivators	64	63	1
Main workers: Agricultural labourers	13	12	1
Main workers: Household industry workers	0	0	0
Main workers: Other	4	3	1
Marginal workers (total)	23	15	8
Marginal workers: Cultivators	0	0	0
Marginal workers: Agricultural labourers	22	14	8
Marginal workers: Household industry workers	0	0	0
Marginal workers: Others	1	1	0
Non-workers	248	88	160
