= Gurali =

- village
- Location in Punjab, India Gurali (India)
- Coordinates: 31.0788262°N 75.0800957°E
- Country: India
- State: Punjab
- District: Firozpur
- Tehsil: Zira
- Elevation: 211 m (692 ft)

Population (2011)
  - Total: 215
- Time zone: UTC+5:30 (IST)
- 2011 census code: 34248

Gurali is a village in the Firozpur district of Punjab, India. It is located in the Zira tehsil.

== Demographics ==
According to the 2011 census of India, Gurali has 50 households. The effective literacy rate (i.e. the literacy rate of population excluding children aged 6 and below) is 66.84%.

Demographics (2011 Census)
	Total	Male	Female
Population	215	118	97
Children aged below 6 years	25	12	13
Scheduled caste	123	67	56
Scheduled tribe	0	0	0
Literates	127	82	45
Workers (all)	72	70	2
Main workers (total)	66	64	2
Main workers: Cultivators	22	21	1
Main workers: Agricultural labourers	34	33	1
Main workers: Household industry workers	1	1	0
Main workers: Other	9	9	0
Marginal workers (total)	6	6	0
Marginal workers: Cultivators	0	0	0
Marginal workers: Agricultural labourers	6	6	0
Marginal workers: Household industry workers	0	0	0
Marginal workers: Others	0	0	0
Non-workers	143	48	95
