= Burj Mohamad Shahwala =

- village
- Location in Punjab, India Burj Mohamad Shahwala (India)
- Coordinates: 31.0787755°N 75.103454°E
- Country: India
- State: Punjab
- District: Firozpur
- Tehsil: Zira
- Elevation: 210 m (690 ft)

Population (2011)
  - Total: 605
- Time zone: UTC+5:30 (IST)
- 2011 census code: 34227

Burj Mohamad Shahwala is a village in the Firozpur district of Punjab, India. It is located in the Zira tehsil.

== Demographics ==
According to the 2011 census of India, Burj Mohamad Shahwala has 110 households. The effective literacy rate (i.e. the literacy rate of population excluding children aged 6 and below) is 65.04%.

Demographics (2011 Census)
	Total	Male	Female
Population	605	310	295
Children aged below 6 years	73	42	31
Scheduled caste	208	106	102
Scheduled tribe	0	0	0
Literates	346	194	152
Workers (all)	214	167	47
Main workers (total)	30	26	4
Main workers: Cultivators	3	2	1
Main workers: Agricultural labourers	1	0	1
Main workers: Household industry workers	0	0	0
Main workers: Other	26	24	2
Marginal workers (total)	184	141	43
Marginal workers: Cultivators	102	89	13
Marginal workers: Agricultural labourers	58	31	27
Marginal workers: Household industry workers	1	0	1
Marginal workers: Others	23	21	2
Non-workers	391	143	248
