= Silewind =

- village
- Location in Punjab, India Silewind (India)
- Coordinates: 31.0887477°N 75.1049137°E
- Country: India
- State: Punjab
- District: Firozpur
- Tehsil: Zira
- Elevation: 211 m (692 ft)

Population (2011)
  - Total: 534
- Time zone: UTC+5:30 (IST)
- 2011 census code: 34236

Silewind is a village in the Firozpur district of Punjab, India. It is located in the Zira tehsil.

== Demographics ==
According to the 2011 census of India, Silewind has 103 households. The effective literacy rate (i.e. the literacy rate of population excluding children aged 6 and below) is 66.88%.

Demographics (2011 Census)
	Total	Male	Female
Population	534	258	276
Children aged below 6 years	75	32	43
Scheduled caste	397	183	214
Scheduled tribe	0	0	0
Literates	307	168	139
Workers (all)	200	147	53
Main workers (total)	176	146	30
Main workers: Cultivators	101	92	9
Main workers: Agricultural labourers	53	36	17
Main workers: Household industry workers	0	0	0
Main workers: Other	22	18	4
Marginal workers (total)	24	1	23
Marginal workers: Cultivators	1	0	1
Marginal workers: Agricultural labourers	20	1	19
Marginal workers: Household industry workers	0	0	0
Marginal workers: Others	3	0	3
Non-workers	334	111	223
