= Manjwala =

- village
- Location in Punjab, India Manjwala (India)
- Coordinates: 31.1073973°N 75.0491177°E
- Country: India
- State: Punjab
- District: Firozpur
- Tehsil: Zira
- Elevation: 210 m (690 ft)

Population (2011)
  - Total: 760
- Time zone: UTC+5:30 (IST)
- 2011 census code: 34256

Manjwala is a village in the Firozpur district of Punjab, India. It is located in the Zira tehsil.

== Demographics ==
According to the 2011 census of India, Manjwala has 145 households. The effective literacy rate (i.e. the literacy rate of population excluding children aged 6 and below) is 46.45%.

Demographics (2011 census)
	Total	Male	Female
Population	760	377	383
Children aged below 6 years	112	54	58
Scheduled caste	657	323	334
Scheduled tribe	0	0	0
Literates	301	163	138
Workers (all)	223	216	7
Main workers (total)	222	216	6
Main workers: Cultivators	22	22	0
Main workers: Agricultural labourers	185	180	5
Main workers: Household industry workers	0	0	0
Main workers: Other	15	14	1
Marginal workers (total)	1	0	1
Marginal workers: Cultivators	0	0	0
Marginal workers: Agricultural labourers	1	0	1
Marginal workers: Household industry workers	0	0	0
Marginal workers: Others	0	0	0
Non-workers	537	161	376
