= Wara Kalirana =

Wara Kalirana Bara Kalirana
- village
- Location in Punjab, India Wara Kalirana (India)
- Coordinates: 31.113206°N 75.12243°E
- Country: India
- State: Punjab
- District: Firozpur
- Tehsil: Zira
- Elevation: 210 m (690 ft)

Population (2011)
  - Total: 895
- Time zone: UTC+5:30 (IST)
- 2011 census code: 34234

Wara Kalirana is a village in the Firozpur district of Punjab, India. It is located in the Zira tehsil.

== Demographics ==
According to the 2011 census of India, Wara Kalirana has 146 households. The effective literacy rate (i.e. the literacy rate of population excluding children aged 6 and below) is 53.86%.

Demographics (2011 Census)
	Total	Male	Female
Population	895	450	445
Children aged below 6 years	143	78	65
Scheduled caste	773	394	379
Scheduled tribe	0	0	0
Literates	405	227	178
Workers (all)	349	247	102
Main workers (total)	255	237	18
Main workers: Cultivators	133	130	3
Main workers: Agricultural labourers	81	71	10
Main workers: Household industry workers	0	0	0
Main workers: Other	41	36	5
Marginal workers (total)	94	10	84
Marginal workers: Cultivators	47	6	41
Marginal workers: Agricultural labourers	38	3	35
Marginal workers: Household industry workers	0	0	0
Marginal workers: Others	9	1	8
Non-workers	546	203	343
