= Nihalke =

- village
- Location in Punjab, India Nihalke (India)
- Coordinates: 31.11489991°N 74.90040779°E
- Country: India
- State: Punjab
- District: Firozpur
- Tehsil: Zira
- Elevation: 205 m (673 ft)

Population (2011)
  - Total: 442
- Time zone: UTC+5:30 (IST)
- 2011 census code: 34305

Nihalke is a village in the Firozpur district of Punjab, India. It is located in the Zira tehsil.

== Demographics ==
According to the 2011 census of India, Nihalke has 84 households. The effective literacy rate (i.e., the literacy rate of population excluding children aged 6 and below) is 52.11%.

Demographics (2011 Census)
	Total	Male	Female
Population	442	248	194
Children aged below 6 years	39	23	16
Scheduled caste	85	52	33
Scheduled tribe	0	0	0
Literates	210	135	75
Workers (all)	164	154	10
Main workers (total)	123	117	6
Main workers: Cultivators	108	103	5
Main workers: Agricultural labourers	0	0	0
Main workers: Household industry workers	0	0	0
Main workers: Other	15	14	1
Marginal workers (total)	41	37	4
Marginal workers: Cultivators	0	0	0
Marginal workers: Agricultural labourers	30	27	3
Marginal workers: Household industry workers	1	1	0
Marginal workers: Others	10	9	1
Non-workers	278	94	184
