= Madahar Kalu =

- village
- Location in Punjab, India Madahar Kalu (India)
- Coordinates: 31.106554°N 75.0837457°E
- Country: India
- State: Punjab
- District: Firozpur
- Tehsil: Zira
- Elevation: 209 m (686 ft)

Population (2011)
  - Total: 91
- Time zone: UTC+5:30 (IST)
- 2011 census code: 34242

Madahar Kalu is a village in the Firozpur district of Punjab, India. It is located in the Zira tehsil.

== Demographics ==
According to the 2011 census of India, Madahar Kalu has 16 households. The effective literacy rate (i.e. the literacy rate of population excluding children aged 6 and below) is 70.59%.

Demographics (2011 Census)
	Total	Male	Female
Population	91	49	42
Children aged below 6 years	6	4	2
Scheduled caste	24	15	9
Scheduled tribe	0	0	0
Literates	60	32	28
Workers (all)	30	26	4
Main workers (total)	30	26	4
Main workers: Cultivators	13	12	1
Main workers: Agricultural labourers	3	2	1
Main workers: Household industry workers	0	0	0
Main workers: Other	14	12	2
Marginal workers (total)	0	0	0
Marginal workers: Cultivators	0	0	0
Marginal workers: Agricultural labourers	0	0	0
Marginal workers: Household industry workers	0	0	0
Marginal workers: Others	0	0	0
Non-workers	61	23	38
