= Talwandi Nepalan =

- village
- Location in Punjab, India Talwandi Nepalan (India)
- Coordinates: 31.1082158°N 74.9617924°E
- Country: India
- State: Punjab
- District: Ferozepur
- Tehsil: Zira

Area
  - Total: 3 km^{2} (1.2 sq mi)
- Elevation: 207 m (679 ft)

Population (2011)
  - Total: 2,745
  - Density: 920/km^{2} (2,400/sq mi)
- Time zone: UTC+5:30 (IST)
- Postal code: 142044
- Area code: 034285
- 2011 census code: 34285

Talwandi Nepalan is a village in the Ferozepur district of Punjab, India. It is located in the Zira tehsil.

== Demographics ==
According to the 2011 census of India, Talwandi Nepalan has 526 households. The effective literacy rate (i.e. the literacy rate of population excluding children aged 6 and below) is 68.69%.

Demographics (2011 Census)
	Total	Male	Female
Population	2745	1460	1285
Children aged below 6 years	369	200	169
Scheduled caste	1225	640	585
Scheduled tribe	0	0	0
Literates	1632	950	682
Workers (all)	774	730	44
Main workers (total)	622	593	29
Main workers: Cultivators	257	252	5
Main workers: Agricultural labourers	178	173	5
Main workers: Household industry workers	11	10	1
Main workers: Other	176	158	18
Marginal workers (total)	152	137	15
Marginal workers: Cultivators	28	25	3
Marginal workers: Agricultural labourers	71	65	6
Marginal workers: Household industry workers	4	4	0
Marginal workers: Others	49	43	6
Non-workers	1971	730	1241
