= Fattewala =

- village
- Location in Punjab Location in India
- Coordinates: 31.1056928°N 74.8259525°E
- Country: India
- State: Punjab
- District: Firozpur
- Tehsil: Zira
- Elevation: 204 m (669 ft)

Population (2011)
  - Total: 901
- Time zone: UTC+5:30 (IST)
- Postal code: 152021
- 2011 census code: 34300

Fattewala is a village in the Firozpur district of Punjab, India. It is located in the Zira tehsil.

== Demographics ==
According to the 2011 census of India, Fattewala has 161 households. The effective literacy rate (i.e. the literacy rate of population excluding children aged 6 and below) is 61.87%.

Demographics (2011 Census)
	Total	Male	Female
Population	901	464	437
Children aged below 6 years	130	73	57
Scheduled caste	278	131	147
Scheduled tribe	0	0	0
Literates	477	270	207
Workers (all)	296	263	33
Main workers (total)	196	185	11
Main workers: Cultivators	162	153	9
Main workers: Agricultural labourers	10	9	1
Main workers: Household industry workers	0	0	0
Main workers: Other	24	23	1
Marginal workers (total)	100	78	22
Marginal workers: Cultivators	12	9	3
Marginal workers: Agricultural labourers	43	35	8
Marginal workers: Household industry workers	0	0	0
Marginal workers: Others	45	34	11
Non-workers	605	201	404
