= Khiali =

- village
- Location in Punjab, India Khiali (India)
- Coordinates: 31.0789197°N 75.1165915°E
- Country: India
- State: Punjab
- District: Firozpur
- Tehsil: Zira
- Elevation: 212 m (696 ft)

Population (2011)
  - Total: 252
- Time zone: UTC+5:30 (IST)
- 2011 census code: 34230

Khiali is a village in the Firozpur district of Punjab, India. It is located in the Zira tehsil.

== Demographics ==
According to the 2011 census of India, Khiali has 59 households. The effective literacy rate (the literacy rate of population excluding children aged 6 and below) is 63.04%.

Demographics (2011 Census)
	Total	Male	Female
Population	252	130	122
Children aged below 6 years	22	15	7
Scheduled caste	205	107	98
Scheduled tribe	0	0	0
Literates	145	77	68
Workers (all)	82	79	3
Main workers (total)	74	71	3
Main workers: Cultivators	42	41	1
Main workers: Agricultural labourers	27	27	0
Main workers: Household industry workers	0	0	0
Main workers: Other	5	3	2
Marginal workers (total)	8	8	0
Marginal workers: Cultivators	2	2	0
Marginal workers: Agricultural labourers	3	3	0
Marginal workers: Household industry workers	0	0	0
Marginal workers: Others	3	3	0
Non-workers	170	51	119
