= Bhupewala =

- village
- Location in Punjab, India Bhupewala (India)
- Coordinates: 31.1124656°N 75.0567341°E
- Country: India
- State: Punjab
- District: Firozpur
- Tehsil: Zira
- Elevation: 210 m (690 ft)

Population (2011)
  - Total: 554
- Time zone: UTC+5:30 (IST)
- 2011 census code: 34258

Bhupewala is a village in the Firozpur district of Punjab, India. It is located in the Zira tehsil.

== Demographics ==
According to the 2011 census of India, Bhupewala has 87 households. The effective literacy rate (i.e. the literacy rate of population excluding children aged 6 and below) is 60.76%.

Demographics (2011 Census)
| | Total | Male | Female |
|---|---|---|---|
| Population | 554 | 281 | 273 |
| Children aged below 6 years | 80 | 37 | 43 |
| Scheduled caste | 478 | 241 | 237 |
| Scheduled tribe | 0 | 0 | 0 |
| Literates | 288 | 168 | 120 |
| Workers (all) | 154 | 146 | 8 |
| Main workers (total) | 140 | 133 | 7 |
| Main workers: Cultivators | 71 | 68 | 3 |
| Main workers: Agricultural labourers | 56 | 52 | 4 |
| Main workers: Household industry workers | 0 | 0 | 0 |
| Main workers: Other | 13 | 13 | 0 |
| Marginal workers (total) | 14 | 13 | 1 |
| Marginal workers: Cultivators | 3 | 3 | 0 |
| Marginal workers: Agricultural labourers | 6 | 5 | 1 |
| Marginal workers: Household industry workers | 0 | 0 | 0 |
| Marginal workers: Others | 5 | 5 | 0 |
| Non-workers | 400 | 135 | 265 |
