= Wara Suleman =

Wara Suleman Bara Suleman
- village
- Location in Punjab, India Wara Suleman (India)
- Coordinates: 31.1013207°N 75.1165915°E
- Country: India
- State: Punjab
- District: Firozpur
- Tehsil: Zira
- Elevation: 209 m (686 ft)

Population (2011)
  - Total: 219
- Time zone: UTC+5:30 (IST)
- 2011 census code: 34233

Wara Suleman is a village in the Firozpur district of Punjab, India. It is located in the Zira tehsil.

== Demographics ==
According to the 2011 census of India, Wara Suleman has 35 households. The effective literacy rate (i.e. the literacy rate of population excluding children aged 6 and below) is 52.82%.

Demographics (2011 Census)
	Total	Male	Female
Population	219	108	111
Children aged below 6 years	24	10	14
Scheduled caste	184	90	94
Scheduled tribe	0	0	0
Literates	103	59	44
Workers (all)	73	71	2
Main workers (total)	71	69	2
Main workers: Cultivators	32	31	1
Main workers: Agricultural labourers	31	30	1
Main workers: Household industry workers	0	0	0
Main workers: Other	8	8	0
Marginal workers (total)	2	2	0
Marginal workers: Cultivators	1	1	0
Marginal workers: Agricultural labourers	1	1	0
Marginal workers: Household industry workers	0	0	0
Marginal workers: Others	0	0	0
Non-workers	146	37	109
