= Dibwala =

- village
- Location in Punjab, India Dibwala (India)
- Coordinates: 31.0956255°N 75.0800957°E
- Country: India
- State: Punjab
- District: Firozpur
- Tehsil: Zira
- Elevation: 212 m (696 ft)

Population (2011)
  - Total: 275
- Time zone: UTC+5:30 (IST)
- 2011 census code: 34246

Dibwala is a village in the Firozpur district of Punjab, India. It is located in the Zira tehsil.

== Demographics ==
According to the 2011 census of India, Dibwala has 52 households. The effective literacy rate (i.e. the literacy rate of population excluding children aged 6 and below) is 70.78%.

Demographics (2011 Census)
| | Total | Male | Female |
|---|---|---|---|
| Population | 275 | 132 | 143 |
| Children aged below 6 years | 32 | 17 | 15 |
| Scheduled caste | 22 | 12 | 10 |
| Scheduled tribe | 0 | 0 | 0 |
| Literates | 172 | 89 | 83 |
| Workers (all) | 82 | 72 | 10 |
| Main workers (total) | 69 | 65 | 4 |
| Main workers: Cultivators | 33 | 33 | 0 |
| Main workers: Agricultural labourers | 5 | 5 | 0 |
| Main workers: Household industry workers | 0 | 0 | 0 |
| Main workers: Other | 31 | 27 | 4 |
| Marginal workers (total) | 13 | 7 | 6 |
| Marginal workers: Cultivators | 6 | 5 | 1 |
| Marginal workers: Agricultural labourers | 1 | 0 | 1 |
| Marginal workers: Household industry workers | 0 | 0 | 0 |
| Marginal workers: Others | 6 | 2 | 4 |
| Non-workers | 193 | 60 | 133 |
