= Bhutiwala =

- village
- Location in Punjab, India Bhutiwala (India)
- Coordinates: 31.1189823°N 75.0289877°E
- Country: India
- State: Punjab
- District: Firozpur
- Tehsil: Zira
- Elevation: 210 m (690 ft)

Population (2011)
  - Total: 353
- Time zone: UTC+5:30 (IST)
- 2011 census code: 34274

Bhutiwala is a village in the Firozpur district of Punjab, India. It is located in the Zira tehsil.

== Demographics ==
According to the 2011 census of India, Bhutiwala has 63 households. The effective literacy rate (i.e. the literacy rate of population excluding children aged 6 and below) is 67.09%.

Demographics (2011 Census)
	Total	Male	Female
Population	353	187	166
Children aged below 6 years	37	22	15
Scheduled caste	11	8	3
Scheduled tribe	0	0	0
Literates	212	119	93
Workers (all)	110	101	9
Main workers (total)	109	100	9
Main workers: Cultivators	102	96	6
Main workers: Agricultural labourers	3	1	2
Main workers: Household industry workers	0	0	0
Main workers: Other	4	3	1
Marginal workers (total)	1	1	0
Marginal workers: Cultivators	0	0	0
Marginal workers: Agricultural labourers	1	1	0
Marginal workers: Household industry workers	0	0	0
Marginal workers: Others	0	0	0
Non-workers	243	86	157
