= Padhri =

- village
- Location in Punjab, India Padhri (India)
- Coordinates: 31.11262192°N 74.92959023°E
- Country: India
- State: Punjab
- District: Firozpur
- Tehsil: Zira
- Elevation: 206 m (676 ft)

Population (2011)
  - Total: 828
- Time zone: UTC+5:30 (IST)
- 2011 census code: 34290

Padhri is a village in the Firozpur district of Punjab, India. It is located in the Zira tehsil.

== Demographics ==
According to the 2011 census of India, Padhri has 153 households. The effective literacy rate (i.e. the literacy rate of population excluding children aged 6 and below) is 64.67%.

Demographics (2011 census)
	Total	Male	Female
Population	828	445	383
Children aged below 6 years	95	56	39
Scheduled caste	243	135	108
Scheduled tribe	0	0	0
Literates	474	278	196
Workers (all)	273	257	16
Main workers (total)	273	257	16
Main workers: Cultivators	159	155	4
Main workers: Agricultural labourers	19	19	0
Main workers: Household industry workers	2	2	0
Main workers: Other	93	81	12
Marginal workers (total)	0	0	0
Marginal workers: Cultivators	0	0	0
Marginal workers: Agricultural labourers	0	0	0
Marginal workers: Household industry workers	0	0	0
Marginal workers: Others	0	0	0
Non-workers	555	188	367
