= Kalhiwala =

Kalhiwala Kalhewala
- village
- Location in Punjab, India Kalhiwala (India)
- Coordinates: 31.10681649°N 75.05670547°E
- Country: India
- State: Punjab
- District: Firozpur
- Tehsil: Zira
- Elevation: 209 m (686 ft)

Population (2011)
  - Total: 26
- Time zone: UTC+5:30 (IST)
- 2011 census code: 34257

Kalhiwala is a village in the Firozpur district of Punjab, India. It is located in the Zira tehsil.

== Demographics ==
According to the 2011 census of India, Kalhiwala has 5 households. The effective literacy rate (i.e. the literacy rate of population excluding children aged 6 and below) is 80.77%.

Demographics (2011 Census)
	Total	Male	Female
Population	26	11	15
Children aged below 6 years	0	0	0
Scheduled caste	0	0	0
Scheduled tribe	0	0	0
Literates	21	9	12
Workers (all)	8	8	0
Main workers (total)	8	8	0
Main workers: Cultivators	6	6	0
Main workers: Agricultural labourers	0	0	0
Main workers: Household industry workers	0	0	0
Main workers: Other	2	2	0
Marginal workers (total)	0	0	0
Marginal workers: Cultivators	0	0	0
Marginal workers: Agricultural labourers	0	0	0
Marginal workers: Household industry workers	0	0	0
Marginal workers: Others	0	0	0
Non-workers	18	3	15
