= Mahlewala =

Mahlewala Mahle Wala
- village
- Location in Punjab, India Mahlewala (India)
- Coordinates: 31.1193485°N 75.1147634°E
- Country: India
- State: Punjab
- District: Firozpur
- Tehsil: Zira
- Elevation: 209 m (686 ft)

Population (2011)
  - Total: 1,374
- Time zone: UTC+5:30 (IST)
- 2011 census code: 34235

Mahlewala is a village in the Firozpur district of Punjab, India. It is located in the Zira tehsil.

== Demographics ==
According to the 2011 census of India, Mahlewala has 251 households. The effective literacy rate (i.e. the literacy rate of population excluding children aged 6 and below) is 54.15%.

Demographics (2011 Census)
	Total	Male	Female
Population	1374	711	663
Children aged below 6 years	181	92	89
Scheduled caste	1159	596	563
Scheduled tribe	0	0	0
Literates	646	384	262
Workers (all)	608	370	238
Main workers (total)	450	254	196
Main workers: Cultivators	31	20	11
Main workers: Agricultural labourers	379	213	166
Main workers: Household industry workers	5	2	3
Main workers: Other	35	19	16
Marginal workers (total)	158	116	42
Marginal workers: Cultivators	6	4	2
Marginal workers: Agricultural labourers	140	105	35
Marginal workers: Household industry workers	0	0	0
Marginal workers: Others	12	7	5
Non-workers	766	341	425
