= Mohamad Shahwala =

- village
- Location in Punjab, India Mohamad Shahwala (India)
- Coordinates: 31.1015688°N 75.0830157°E
- Country: India
- State: Punjab
- District: Firozpur
- Tehsil: Zira
- Elevation: 210 m (690 ft)

Population (2011)
  - Total: 210
- Time zone: UTC+5:30 (IST)
- 2011 census code: 34244

Mohamad Shahwala is a village in the Firozpur district of Punjab, India. It is located in the Zira tehsil.

== Demographics ==
According to the 2011 census of India, Mohamad Shahwala has 39 households. The effective literacy rate (i.e. the literacy rate of population excluding children aged 6 and below) is 56.91%.

Demographics (2011 Census)
	Total	Male	Female
Population	210	107	103
Children aged below 6 years	29	12	17
Scheduled caste	67	33	34
Scheduled tribe	0	0	0
Literates	103	64	39
Workers (all)	65	61	4
Main workers (total)	65	61	4
Main workers: Cultivators	41	40	1
Main workers: Agricultural labourers	15	15	0
Main workers: Household industry workers	0	0	0
Main workers: Other	9	6	3
Marginal workers (total)	0	0	0
Marginal workers: Cultivators	0	0	0
Marginal workers: Agricultural labourers	0	0	0
Marginal workers: Household industry workers	0	0	0
Marginal workers: Others	0	0	0
Non-workers	145	46	99
