= Lalleh =

- village
- Location in Punjab, India Lalleh (India)
- Coordinates: 31.0637431°N 75.094695°E
- Country: India
- State: Punjab
- District: Firozpur
- Tehsil: Zira
- Elevation: 211 m (692 ft)

Population (2011)
  - Total: 785
- Time zone: UTC+5:30 (IST)
- 2011 census code: 34226

Lalleh is a village in the Firozpur district of Punjab, India. It is located in the Zira tehsil.

== Demographics ==
According to the 2011 census of India, Lalleh has 135 households. The effective literacy rate (i.e. the literacy rate of population excluding children aged 6 and below) is 74.29%.

Demographics (2011 Census)
	Total	Male	Female
Population	785	397	388
Children aged below 6 years	85	46	39
Scheduled caste	249	129	120
Scheduled tribe	0	0	0
Literates	520	281	239
Workers (all)	549	283	266
Main workers (total)	538	277	261
Main workers: Cultivators	133	102	31
Main workers: Agricultural labourers	194	152	42
Main workers: Household industry workers	186	9	177
Main workers: Other	25	14	11
Marginal workers (total)	11	6	5
Marginal workers: Cultivators	0	0	0
Marginal workers: Agricultural labourers	4	3	1
Marginal workers: Household industry workers	3	1	2
Marginal workers: Others	4	2	2
Non-workers	236	114	122
