= Watu Bhatti =

- village
- Location in Punjab, India Watu Bhatti (India)
- Coordinates: 31.1239767°N 74.9296456°E
- Country: India
- State: Punjab
- District: Firozpur
- Tehsil: Zira
- Elevation: 205 m (673 ft)

Population (2011)
  - Total: 358
- Time zone: UTC+5:30 (IST)
- 2011 census code: 34289

Watu Bhatti is a village in the Firozpur district of Punjab, India. It is located in the Zira tehsil.

== Demographics ==
According to the 2011 census of India, Watu Bhatti has 58 households. The effective literacy rate (i.e. the literacy rate of population excluding children aged 6 and below) is 67.5%.

Demographics (2011 Census)
	Total	Male	Female
Population	358	189	169
Children aged below 6 years	38	24	14
Scheduled caste	75	40	35
Scheduled tribe	0	0	0
Literates	216	122	94
Workers (all)	185	100	85
Main workers (total)	100	96	4
Main workers: Cultivators	67	65	2
Main workers: Agricultural labourers	30	29	1
Main workers: Household industry workers	1	0	1
Main workers: Other	2	2	0
Marginal workers (total)	85	4	81
Marginal workers: Cultivators	0	0	0
Marginal workers: Agricultural labourers	3	1	2
Marginal workers: Household industry workers	76	1	75
Marginal workers: Others	6	2	4
Non-workers	173	89	84
