= Mahmudwala =

- village
- Location in Punjab, India Mahmudwala (India)
- Coordinates: 31.111045°N 75.0684153°E
- Country: India
- State: Punjab
- District: Firozpur
- Tehsil: Zira
- Elevation: 209 m (686 ft)

Population (2011)
  - Total: 851
- Time zone: UTC+5:30 (IST)
- 2011 census code: 34259

Mahmudwala is a village in the Firozpur district of Punjab, India. It is located in the Zira tehsil. It is located on the Lohian Khas-Makhu road (National Highway 703A).

== Demographics ==
According to the 2011 census of India, Mahmudwala has 145 households. The effective literacy rate (i.e. the literacy rate of population excluding children aged 6 and below) is 52.76%.

Demographics (2011 Census)
	Total	Male	Female
Population	851	430	421
Children aged below 6 years	144	73	71
Scheduled caste	708	361	347
Scheduled tribe	0	0	0
Literates	373	218	155
Workers (all)	217	183	34
Main workers (total)	205	174	31
Main workers: Cultivators	4	4	0
Main workers: Agricultural labourers	137	111	26
Main workers: Household industry workers	55	53	2
Main workers: Other	9	6	3
Marginal workers (total)	12	9	3
Marginal workers: Cultivators	0	0	0
Marginal workers: Agricultural labourers	9	7	2
Marginal workers: Household industry workers	1	1	0
Marginal workers: Others	2	1	1
Non-workers	634	247	387
