= Madahar Shera =

- village
- Location in Punjab, India Madahar Shera (India)
- Coordinates: 31.071747°N 75.1151318°E
- Country: India
- State: Punjab
- District: Firozpur
- Tehsil: Zira
- Elevation: 212 m (696 ft)

Population (2011)
  - Total: 321
- Time zone: UTC+5:30 (IST)
- 2011 census code: 34229

Madahar Shera is a village in the Firozpur district of Punjab, India. It is located in the Zira tehsil.

== Demographics ==
According to the 2011 census of India, Madahar Shera has 52 households. The effective literacy rate (i.e. the literacy rate of population excluding children aged 6 and below) is 41.54%.

Demographics (2011 Census)
	Total	Male	Female
Population	321	163	158
Children aged below 6 years	49	22	27
Scheduled caste	265	134	131
Scheduled tribe	0	0	0
Literates	113	74	39
Workers (all)	112	91	21
Main workers (total)	110	89	21
Main workers: Cultivators	35	31	4
Main workers: Agricultural labourers	71	57	14
Main workers: Household industry workers	2	1	1
Main workers: Other	2	0	2
Marginal workers (total)	2	2	0
Marginal workers: Cultivators	0	0	0
Marginal workers: Agricultural labourers	0	0	0
Marginal workers: Household industry workers	1	1	0
Marginal workers: Others	1	1	0
Non-workers	209	72	137
