= Laluwala =

- village
- Location in Punjab, India Laluwala (India)
- Coordinates: 31.1279422°N 75.1049137°E
- Country: India
- State: Punjab
- District: Firozpur
- Tehsil: Zira
- Elevation: 210 m (690 ft)

Population (2011)
  - Total: 808
- Time zone: UTC+5:30 (IST)
- 2011 census code: 34238

Laluwala is a village in the Firozpur district of Punjab, India. It is located in the Zira tehsil.

== Demographics ==
According to the 2011 census of India, Laluwala has 139 households. The effective literacy rate (i.e. the literacy rate of population excluding children aged 6 and below) is 43.25%.

Demographics (2011 Census)
	Total	Male	Female
Population	808	425	383
Children aged below 6 years	119	60	59
Scheduled caste	657	338	319
Scheduled tribe	0	0	0
Literates	298	193	105
Workers (all)	172	153	19
Main workers (total)	161	143	18
Main workers: Cultivators	105	92	13
Main workers: Agricultural labourers	52	47	5
Main workers: Household industry workers	0	0	0
Main workers: Other	4	4	0
Marginal workers (total)	11	10	1
Marginal workers: Cultivators	7	6	1
Marginal workers: Agricultural labourers	4	4	0
Marginal workers: Household industry workers	0	0	0
Marginal workers: Others	0	0	0
Non-workers	636	272	364
