= Mannu Machhi =

- village
- Location in Punjab, India Mannu Machhi (India)
- Coordinates: 31.1358907°N 75.0654951°E
- Country: India
- State: Punjab
- District: Firozpur
- Tehsil: Zira
- Elevation: 210 m (690 ft)

Population (2011)
  - Total: 593
- Time zone: UTC+5:30 (IST)
- 2011 census code: 34265

Mannu Machhi is a village in the Firozpur district of Punjab, India. It is located in the Zira tehsil.

== Demographics ==
According to the 2011 census of India, Mannu Machhi has 119 households. The effective literacy rate (i.e. the literacy rate of population excluding children aged 6 and below) is 43.91%.

Demographics (2011 Census)
	Total	Male	Female
Population	593	303	290
Children aged below 6 years	117	62	55
Scheduled caste	547	277	270
Scheduled tribe	0	0	0
Literates	209	124	85
Workers (all)	247	154	93
Main workers (total)	144	140	4
Main workers: Cultivators	108	107	1
Main workers: Agricultural labourers	32	29	3
Main workers: Household industry workers	0	0	0
Main workers: Other	4	4	0
Marginal workers (total)	103	14	89
Marginal workers: Cultivators	8	5	3
Marginal workers: Agricultural labourers	95	9	86
Marginal workers: Household industry workers	0	0	0
Marginal workers: Others	0	0	0
Non-workers	346	149	197
