= Mirze Ke =

Village in Punjab, India

Coordinates: 30°48′58″N 74°48′43″E

Mirze Ke is a village in Firzopur district, Punjab, India. The PIN code of this village is 142052. The literacy rate of Mirze Ke is 64%.
