= Chak Suhele Wala =

Village in India

Chak Suhele Wala is a village in Firozpur district in the state of Punjab, in India.
