= Shian pari =

Shian Pari is a village in Firozpur district in the Indian state of Punjab. It is situated two highways: Amritsar to Bathinda Road and Amristsar to Moga Road. It is situated 1.5 km away from the main Amritsar - Bathinda road, near Makhu and 3 km from the Amritsar-Moga road. It is 12 km away from Tehsil Zira. Two gurdwara (Sikh temples) are located in the village. One is on the east side of the village and the other on the west side.

== Demographics ==
As of the 2011 India census, Shian Pari had a population of 2264 people. Males constitute 52% of the population and females 48%. The village has an average literacy rate of 58.3%, higher than the national average of 59.5%: male literacy is 63.84% and female literacy is 52.2%. In Makhu, 14% of the population is under 6 years of age. Almost all of the families came from Pakistan in 1947 at the time of partition of India.
