= Malhuwala, Zira (census code 34421) =

Malhuwala
- village
- Location in Punjab, India Malhuwala (India)
- Coordinates: 30.99048622°N 75.09223938°E
- Country: India
- State: Punjab
- District: Firozpur
- Tehsil: Zira
- Elevation: 213 m (699 ft)

Population (2011)
  - Total: 604
- Time zone: UTC+5:30 (IST)
- 2011 census code: 34421

Malhuwala is a village in the Firozpur district of Punjab, India. It is located in the Zira tehsil.

== Demographics ==
According to the 2011 census of India, Malhuwala has 110 households. The effective literacy rate (i.e. the literacy rate of population excluding children aged 6 and below) is 60.3%.

Demographics (2011 Census)
	Total	Male	Female
Population	604	318	286
Children aged below 6 years	65	33	32
Scheduled caste	132	70	62
Scheduled tribe	0	0	0
Literates	325	198	127
Workers (all)	365	223	142
Main workers (total)	197	194	3
Main workers: Cultivators	107	105	2
Main workers: Agricultural labourers	60	60	0
Main workers: Household industry workers	4	3	1
Main workers: Other	26	26	0
Marginal workers (total)	168	29	139
Marginal workers: Cultivators	59	6	53
Marginal workers: Agricultural labourers	92	21	71
Marginal workers: Household industry workers	10	1	9
Marginal workers: Others	7	1	6
Non-workers	239	95	144
