= Malhuwala, Zira (census code 34397) =

Malhuwala
- Village
- Location in Punjab, India Malhuwala (India)
- Coordinates: 30.9341568°N 74.8755663°E
- Country: India
- State: Punjab
- District: Firozpur
- Tehsil: Zira
- Elevation: 204 m (669 ft)

Population (2011)
  - Total: 137
- Time zone: UTC+5:30 (IST)
- 2011 census code: 34397

Malhuwala is a village in the Firozpur district of Punjab, India. It is located in the Zira tehsil.

== Demographics ==
According to the 2011 census of India, Malhuwala has 22 households. The effective literacy rate (i.e. the literacy rate of population older than 6 years) is 83.33%.

Demographics (2011 Census)
	Total	Male	Female
Population	137	72	65
Children aged below 6 years	11	6	5
Scheduled caste	0	0	0
Scheduled tribe	0	0	0
Literates	105	60	45
Workers (all)	36	35	1
Main workers (total)	36	35	1
Main workers: Cultivators	29	28	1
Main workers: Agricultural labourers	2	2	0
Main workers: Household industry workers	3	3	0
Main workers: Other	2	2	0
Marginal workers (total)	0	0	0
Marginal workers: Cultivators	0	0	0
Marginal workers: Agricultural labourers	0	0	0
Marginal workers: Household industry workers	0	0	0
Marginal workers: Others	0	0	0
Non-workers	101	37	64
