= Firozpur Fort =

14th-century fortress in Punjab, India

Coordinates: 30.946°N 74.598°E

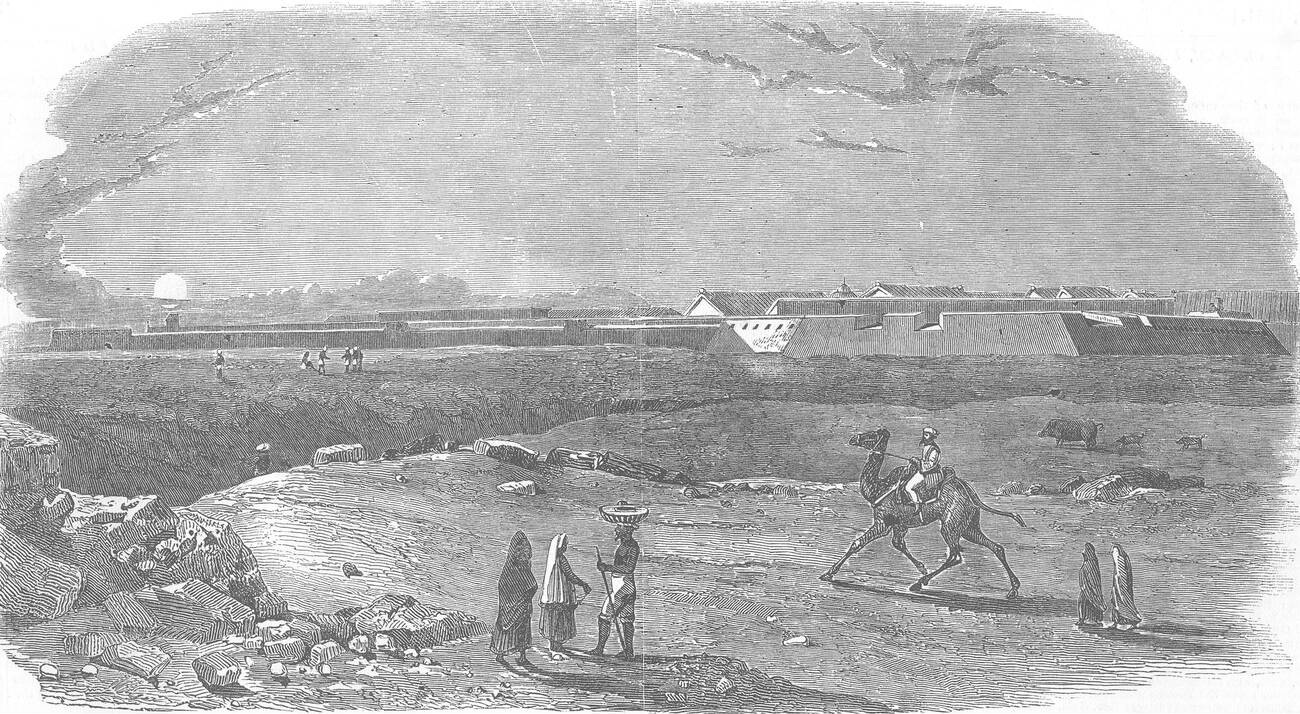
"Ferozepore – the Fort" from the Illustrated London News, 1851

The Firozpur Fort is a hexagonal-shaped fortress located in the city of Firozpur in Punjab, India, near the Indo-Pakistani border. It is purported to have originally been constructed during the reign of Feroze Shah Tughlaq (r. 1351–1388). Other sources claim the fortress was constructed during the Sikh-period. After the death of Lachhman Kaur and the lapsing of the Ferozepore Jagir into direct British-control in 1835, the Duke of Wellington ordered that the British take-over the fort and turn it into a garrison by 1839. In 1844, the British were erecting fortress constructions in Ferozepore, which annoyed the Sikh Empire to the north. By 1858, the fort was producing different kinds of munitions from its arsenal. At any given time, there were around 10,000 bullocks, an equivalent amount of horses, and 150 camels at the fort. The fort was later converted into a base depot that supplied weapons, ammunition, and trained animals. The fortress was later referenced by Hitler in his Mein Kampf, who later viewed the fort as a key target during World War II. The fort continued to be used as an arsenal until 1941 when the ammunition was shifted to Kasubegu.

The historical Ferozepore Fortress has recently been re-opened to the public by the Indian Army's Golden Arrow Division.
