= Malhuwala, Firozpur tehsil =

Village in Punjab, India

Malhuwala
- village
- Location in Punjab, India Malhuwala (India)
- Coordinates: 30.82464345°N 74.53777313°E
- Country: India
- State: Punjab
- District: Firozpur
- Tehsil: Firozpur
- Elevation: 190 m (620 ft)

Population
  - Total: 614
- Time zone: UTC+5:30 (IST)
- 2011 census code: 34773

Malhuwala is a village in the Firozpur district of Punjab, India. It is located in the Firozpur tehsil.

== Demographics ==
According to the 2011 census of India, Malhuwala has 117 households. The effective literacy rate (i.e. the literacy rate of population excluding children aged 6 and below) is 72.58%.

Demographics (2011 Census)
	Total	Male	Female
Population	614	323	291
Children aged below 6 years	67	42	25
Scheduled caste	245	128	117
Scheduled tribe	0	0	0
Literates	397	216	181
Workers (all)	200	187	13
Main workers (total)	197	184	13
Main workers: Cultivators	119	116	3
Main workers: Agricultural labourers	54	51	3
Main workers: Household industry workers	3	3	0
Main workers: Other	21	14	7
Marginal workers (total)	3	3	0
Marginal workers: Cultivators	0	0	0
Marginal workers: Agricultural labourers	3	3	0
Marginal workers: Household industry workers	0	0	0
Marginal workers: Others	0	0	0
Non-workers	414	136	278
