= Ferozepore (jagir) =

Sikh estate in Punjab, India, 1761–1835

Ferozepore Jagir
- 1761–1835
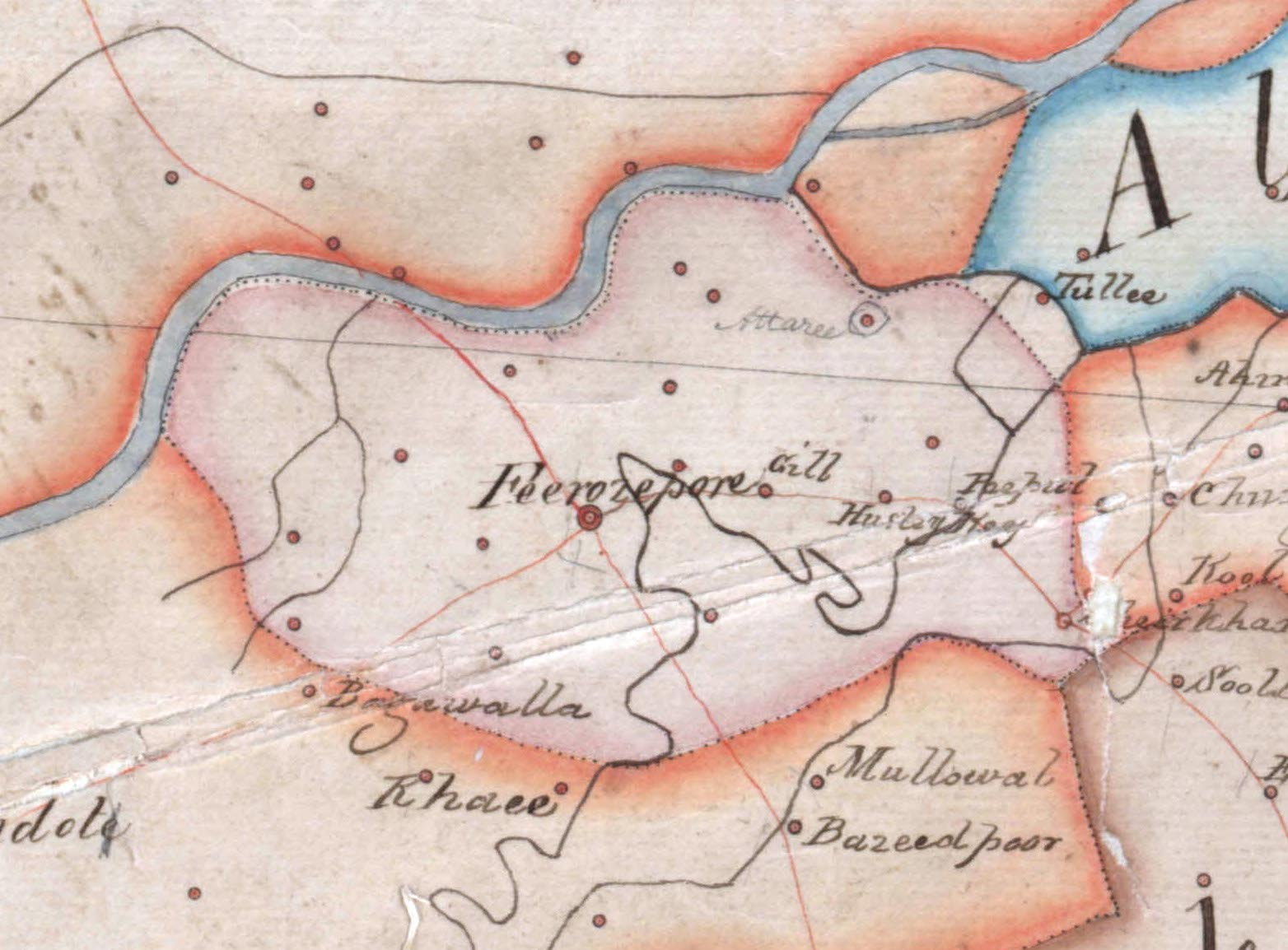
- Detail of the main, continuous tract of territory of Ferozepore Estate from a map created by the British East India Company, ca.1829–1835
- Capital: Ferozepore
- History
  - Established: 1761
  - Disestablished: 1835
- Today part of: Punjab, India

Ferozepore Jagir, or Ferozepore Estate, was a small cis-Sutlej Sikh estate in the form of jagir based around Ferozepore in Punjab. (Note: There are various archaic and modern spellings of 'Ferozepur', such as Ferozepore, Ferozepur, Ferozpore, Ferozepur, Ferozpur, Firozpore, Firozpur, and others. The official spelling presently used by the government of the state of Punjab (India) is 'Firozpur'.) It was occupied by the British in 1835 after the death of Lachhman Kaur. The estate was a jagir of the Sikh Empire under Ranjit Singh until it lapsed into British control.

== History ==
The name of Ferozepore is said to derive either from Feroz Shah Tughlaq, sultan of Delhi, or from a Bhatti chief, named Feroze Khan, who was a mid-16th century Manj Rajput chief.

The period of Sikh influence in the region was affirmed in 1758, when Adina Beg was defeated by the Sikhs. In 1761, the Sikh chief Hari Singh of the Bhangi Misl captured Kasur and nearby areas of Ferozepore. One of the Bhangi sardars of Hari Singh, named Gurja (Gujar) Singh, along with his brother Nushaha Singh, and two nephews, Gurbakhsh Singh and Mastan Singh, took hold of Ferozepore for the Sikhs. Later, Gurja (Gujar) Singh gave Ferozepore to his nephew, Gurbakhsh Singh. The Ferozepore territory as it existed then contained 37 villages. In 1792, Gurbaksh Singh decided to divy up his territorial possessions amongst his four sons, with his second-son, Dhanna Singh, being bestowed control over the Ferozepore territory.

In ca.1818–19, Dhanna Singh died and therefore was succeeded by his widow, Lachhman Kaur. (Note: Lachhman Kaur's name is alternatively spelt as 'Rani Lacchman Kaur'.) In 1820, Lachhman Kaur went on a pilgrimage to shrines of Haridwar, Gaya, and Jagannath after having placed her father-in-law, Gurbakhsh Singh, in charge of Ferozepore in her temporary absence. However, it was during this absence that Baghel Singh, nephew of the deceased Dhanna Singh, occupied the Ferozepore Fort under the guise of visiting his grandfather Gurbaksh Singh. After three years of travels, Lachhman Kaur returned to Ferozepore in 1823 to find that Baghel Singh has holed himself in the fortress and was unable to expel him. Therefore, she enlisted the help of the British East India Company to reclaim her possession of Ferozepore. Through the efforts of Captain Ross, the Deputy Superintendent of Sikh Affairs, whom represented her case to the Lahore agent representing the Sikh Empire, Maharaja Ranjit Singh gave orders to Baghel Singh to relinquish his antics, allowing Lachhman Kaur to return to her rule of Ferozepore. Baghel Singh died in 1826. Lachhman Kaur complained about her rebellious subjects and that they did not respect the rules of a woman.

Lachhman Kaur died issueless on 28 September 1835 (other sources gives her date of death as being October 1835 or December 1835) after ruling Ferozepore for sixteen years as an independent chieftain. In July 1838, Jhanda Singh and Chanda Singh, the brothers of Baghel Singh and nephews of Dhanna Singh, both claimed the chiefship of Ferozepore. However, these attempts were unsuccessful and the Ferozepore territory lapsed into direct British-control. Henry Lawrence took full charge of the absorbed territory in 1839. Ranjit Singh had claimed Lachhman Kaur to be his jagirdar of Ferozepur and thus lost Ferozepur to the British. Captain C. M. Wade suggested that the British Residency be moved from Ludhiana to Ferozepur to better surveil the Sikh Empire but this was ultimately decided against in-order to not overly antagonize the Lahore State.

== Legacy ==
The samadhs of Lachhman Kaur and Dhanna Singh are located on the side of the Rani-ka-Taalab, now a dry-tank. They are currently situated within the campus of a local educational institute. A Radha-Krishan and Shavist temple is located near the samadhs.

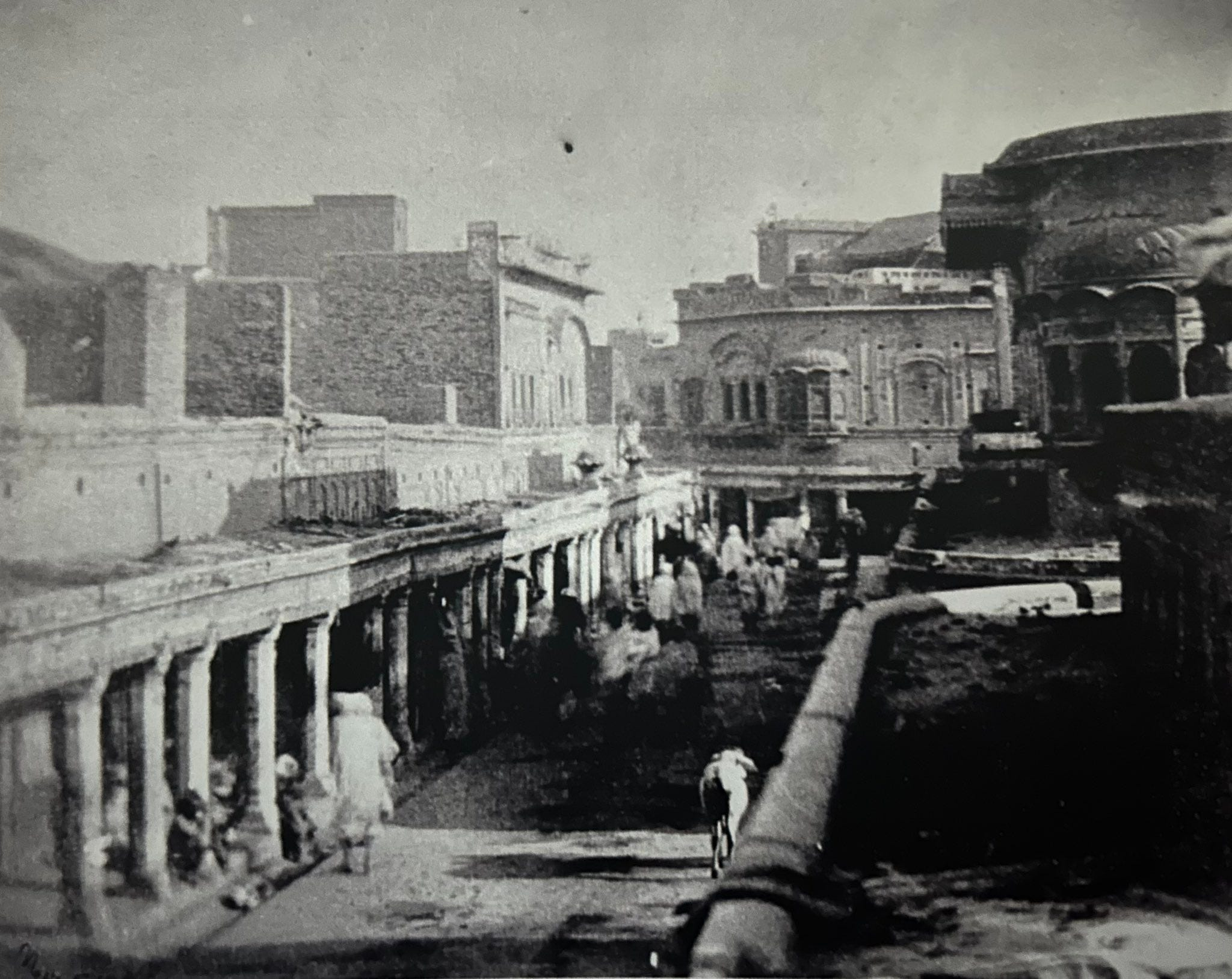
Photograph of a street-scene in Ferozepore, Punjab, 1856. Possibly showing Delhi Gate within the city.

The settlement of Ferozepore used to have a city-wall with ten gates to protect it. However, currently only five of the ten gates of the former wall still exist, all of them in poor condition. The ten gates were:

1. Delhi Gate
2. Mori Gate
3. Baghdadi Gate (still extant)
4. Zira Gate
5. Makhu Gate (still extant)
6. Bansanwala Gate
7. Amritsari Gate (still extant)
8. Kasuri Gate (still extant)
9. Multani Gate (still extant)
10. Magzini Gate

The historical Ferozepore Fortress has recently been re-opened to the public after 200-years.

== List of leaders ==
- Gurja (Gujar) Singh (1761–?)
- Gurbakhsh Singh (? – 1792)
- Dhanna Singh (1792–ca.1818–19)
- Lachhman Kaur (ca.1818–19–1820) (1st)
- Baghel Singh (1820–23)
- Lachhman Kaur (1823–1835) (2nd)

== Maps ==
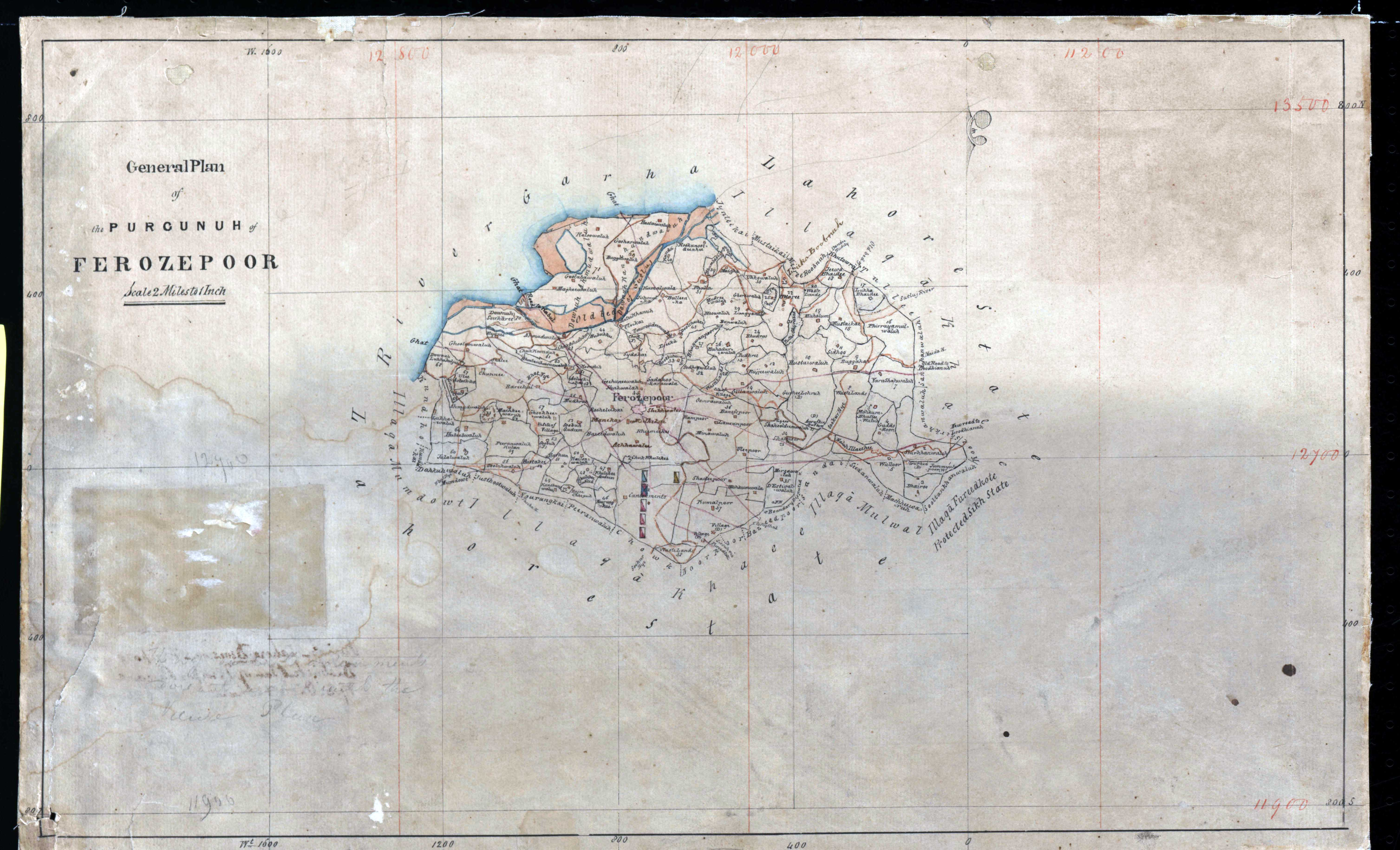
Map of the general plan of the pargana of Firozpur, by William Brown, 1842

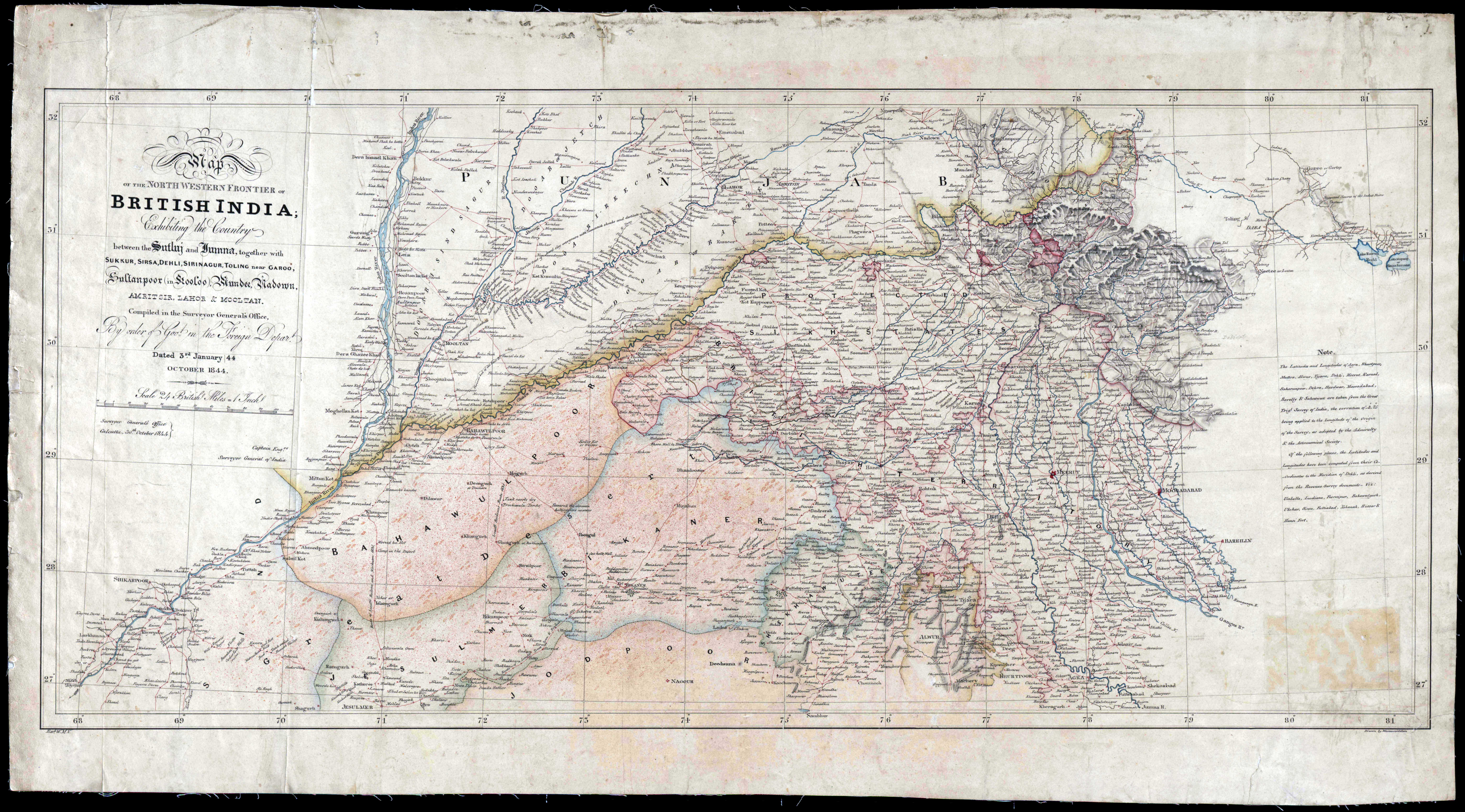
Map of the northwestern frontier of British India, exhibiting the country between the Sutlej and Yamuna rivers, 1844. The former Ferozepore territory is now depicted under the direct control of the British after its annexation in 1835.
