= Nathana, India =

Nathana
- Town
- Location in Punjab, India Nathana (India)
- Coordinates: 30.3162°N 75.0912°E
- Country: India
- State: Punjab
- District: Bathinda

Government
  - Body: Nagar Palika
  - Rank: 1

Population
  - Total: 11,000 approx:

Languages
  - Official: Punjabi
- Time zone: UTC+5:30 (IST)
- Pin Code: 151102
- Vehicle registration: 03

Nathana is a town and a municipal council in the Bathinda district of the Indian state of Punjab.

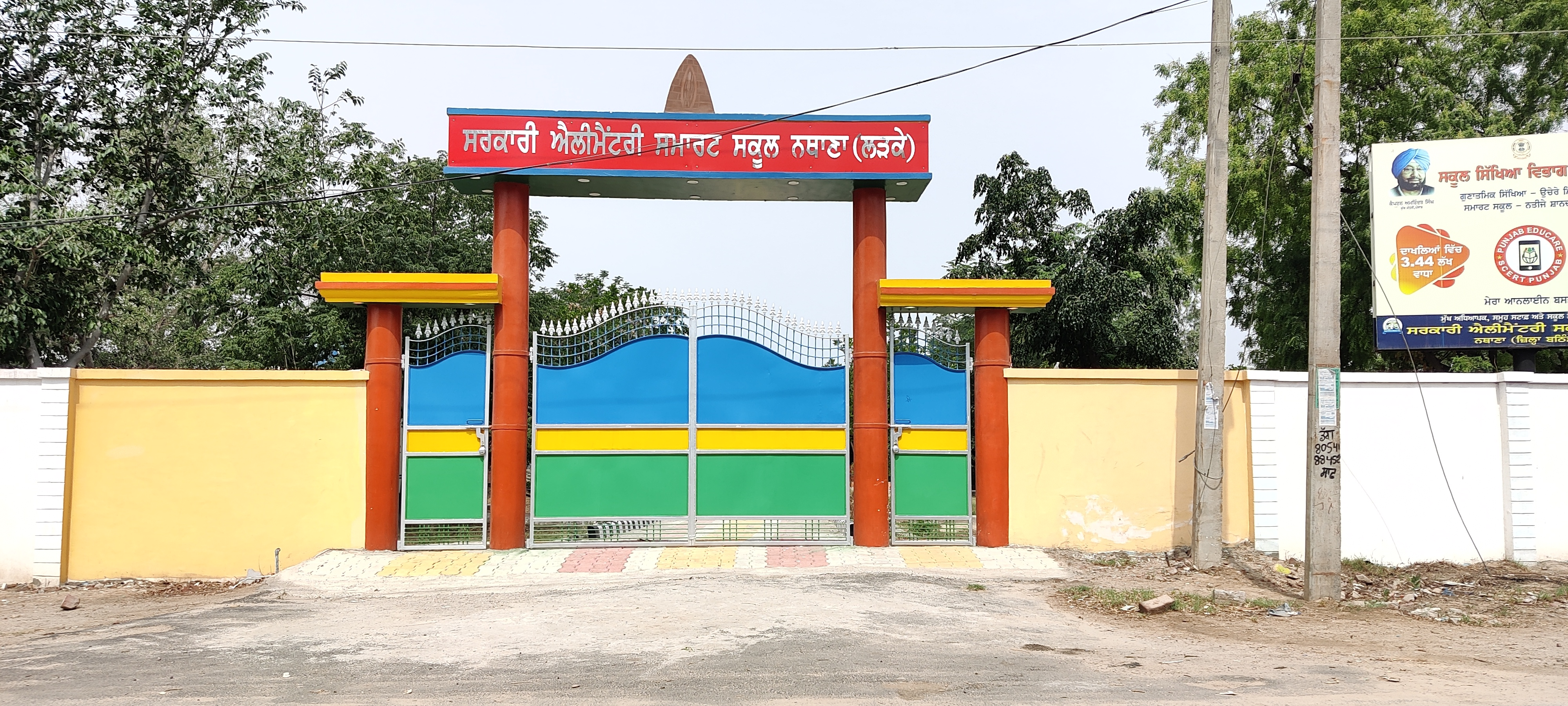
Entrance of Govt. Elementary School Nathana (Bathinda)

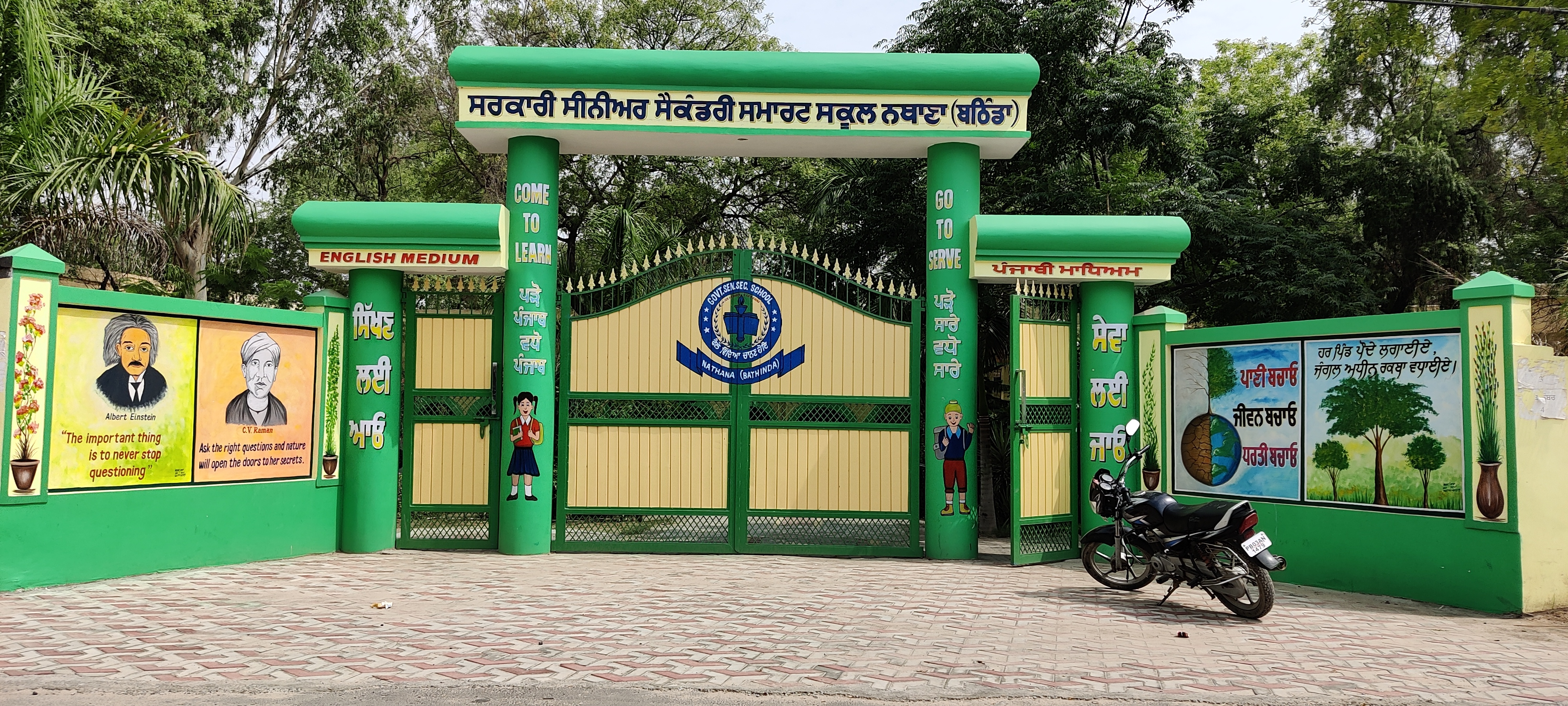
Entrance of Govt. Senior Secondary School Nathana (Bathinda)
