= Zira, Punjab =

Town in Punjab, India

Zira
- City
- Zira
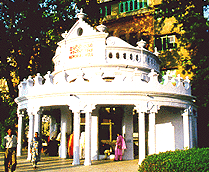
- Jain Swetamber Temple, Zira

- Location in Punjab, India Zira (India)
- Coordinates: 30.97°N 74.99°E
- Country: India
- State: Punjab
- District: Firozpur

Government
  - Body: Nagar Palika
  - Member of the Legislative Assembly: Naresh Kataria (Aam Aadmi Party) since 2022

Population (2011)
  - Total: 36,732
- Time zone: UTC+5:30 (IST)
- PIN: 142047
- Telephone code: 01682
- Vehicle registration: PB-47

Zira is a town and a municipal council in Ferozepur district in the Indian state of Punjab.

== History ==
Zira had been for many years a wasteland, when in 1508 Ahmad Shah came from Gugera and founded Zira Khas. He was driven out by Sher Shah Suri, during whose rule nearly all the villages of this ilaqa were located. Mohar Singh was in turn driven out by Dewan Mokham Chand, Ranjit Singh's general, and the ilaqa was added to the Lahore Demesne. It was afterwards divided into two portions, of which the eastern portion, which preserved the name, Zira, was given to Sarbuland Khan, a servant of the Lahore Government, and the western portion, named ilaqa Ambarhar, was made an appanage of Kanwar Sher Singh, son of the Punjab sovereign. At a later date, Sher Singh obtained the possession of the whole ilaqa and abolished the subdivision of Ambarhar.

The precise date of the founding of the municipality is uncertain; one source indicates the Municipality Committee, Zira, was constituted in 1876 while another gives the year as 1867.

Zira was one of the two tehsils of Punjab, (the other one being Ferozepur), that was part of a controversy during the partition of India. Sir Cyril Radcliffe created the boundary between India and Pakistan just days before the partition. A draft of the Award was supposedly sent to Evan Jenkins, the provincial governor of Punjab by George Abell, Lord Mountbatten of Burma's private secretary, with a preliminary description of the Punjab boundary. This draft showed the Ferozepur and Zira tehsils being allotted to Pakistan. During partition Zira city had a Muslim majority by 51% Sikhs making up 35% and Hindus 14%. When violence erupted in most Ferozepur Zira area was very quiet because most of the residents treated each other like brothers. Many Sikh residents were really close to there Muslim friends and did not want them to leave, but due to so much problems in the Ferozepur area they had no choice to leave.

The final version of the boundary however awarded the areas to India. This led Mohammed Ali Jinnah, the founder of Pakistan, to proclaim that the Award of the Boundary Commission was unjust, incomprehensible and perverse. He, however, agreed to abide by it. The dispute was settled in 1960 as part of an agreement between the governments of India and Pakistan.

In 1947, at the time of partition, almost all the Muslim community who were living in "Zira" migrated to Pakistan. They settled in "Pakpattan", "Khanewal", "Vehari", "Sahiwal" and "Muzaffargarh" districts of Western Punjab. They engaged in farming, business and government services. Most of them named themselves as "Zirvi" (which is a sign of love to their "dharti maan"). These people always praised the good behaviour of Sikhs and Hindus at the time of partition and fondly remember the sweet memories of Zira. It reflects that how a calm and prosperous town was that prior to partition where the people lived with harmony.

Zira Bomb Case, 1930 – The high-handedness of the British invaders in suppressing the rising tide of freedom movement in India with the worst type of governmental barbarity produced its reaction in the growth and spread of revolutionary activity to avenge the wrongs done to the people. One such incident in the Ferozepur District was the Zira Bomb Case of October 1930. The Zira Bar Association was formed in the same year.

== Population ==
As of the 2011 Census of India, Zira had a population of 36,732. Males constitute 52% of the population and females 48%. Zira has an average literacy rate of 63%, higher than the national average of 59.5%: male literacy is 66%, and female literacy is 59%. In Zira, 13% of the population is under 6 years of age. Zira's population was 2,702 in 1853.

The table below shows the population of different religious groups in Zira city, as of 2011 census.

Population by religious groups in Zira city, 2011 census
Religion	Total	Female	Male
Sikh	22,515	10,744	11,771
Hindu	14,000	6700	7300
Christian	403	196	207
Muslim	213	99	114
Jain	173	86	87
Buddhist	4	1	3
Other religions	3	1	2
Not stated	110	57	53
Total	37,498	17,888	19,610

== Politics ==
The town is a part of Zira Assembly Constituency. Naresh Kataria of Aam Aadmi Party is the MLA elected in 2022 Punjab Legislative Assembly election.

== Education ==
Schools and colleges in Zira are:

- Bhai gurdas mal school for girls
- Shri Atam Vallabh Jain Vidyapeeth Society
- Ambrosial Public School
- Government College Zira
- DPD College
- Doon Valley Cambridge School
- Paradise Public Senior Secondary School
- Jiwan Mall Government Senior Secondary School
- Shri Guru Nanak Sahib Public High School, Zira.
- Sh Tara Chand Aggarwal Sd Sikhsha Sadan Zira.
- My Tuition academy zira
- Kids Planet convent school
