= Firozpur district =

Firozpur district Firojpur district
- District
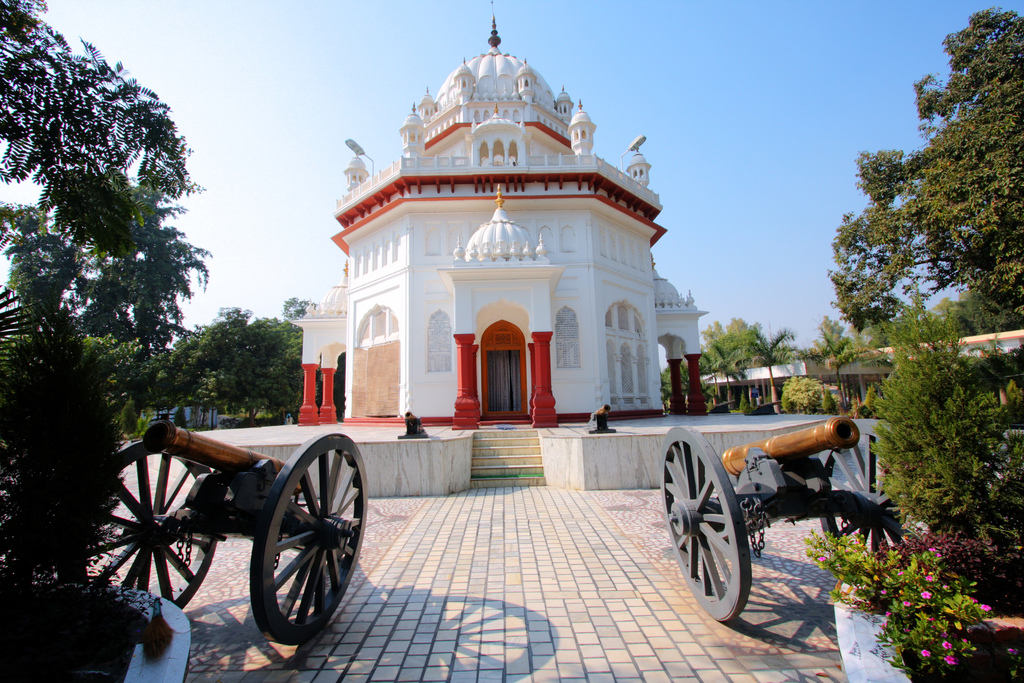
- Memorial gurudwara for Battle of Saragarhi in Firozpur

- Location in Punjab
- Coordinates: 30°56′24″N 74°37′12″E
- Country: India
- State: Punjab
- Founder: Firoz Shah Tughluq
- Named for: Firoz Shah Tughluq
- Headquarters: Firozpur

Area
  - Total: 2,406.84 km^{2} (929.29 sq mi)
  - Rank: 230th

Population (2011)
  - Total: 1,001,931
  - Density: 416.285/km^{2} (1,078.17/sq mi)

Languages
  - Official: Punjabi
- Time zone: UTC+5:30 (IST)
- Postal codes: City – 152001, Cantt – 152002
- Vehicle registration: PB 05
- Literacy: 69.80%
- No. of villages: 639
- Lok Sabha constituency: 1
- Vidhan Sabha constituency: 4
- Website: ferozepur.nic.in

Firozpur district, also known as Ferozepur district, is one of the twenty-three districts in the state of Punjab, India. (Note: There are various archaic and modern spellings of the district, such as Ferozepore, Ferozepur, Ferozpore, Ferozepur, Ferozpur, Firozpore, Firozpur, and others. The official spelling presently used by the government of the state of Punjab (India) is 'Firozpur'.) Firozpur district comprises an area of 2,190 km^{2} (850 sq mi). The district is part of the Firozpur division.

Firozpur (Ferozepur) is the capital city of the district. It is situated inside ten gates—Amritsari Gate, Wansi Gate, Makhu Gate, Zira Gate, Bagdadi Gate, Mori Gate, Delhi Gate, Magjani Gate, Multani Gate, and Kasuri Gate.

== History ==
=== Sikh Period ===
In the 18th century, religious persecution led the Sikhs to form strong warrior groups called Misls, united in resisting Mughal rule. In 1760, they defeated the Mughal Governor of Lahore. In 1763, Hari Singh of the Bhangi Misl sacked Kasur, and his commander Gujjar Singh crossed the Sutlej to capture Ferozepur, handing it over to his nephew Gurbakhsh Singh. Though the Dogars resisted, Gurbakhsh Singh subdued them and expanded his territory on both sides of the Sutlej. Around 1792, he gave Ferozepur to his second son, Dhanna Singh, who proved to be a weak ruler. Facing rebellion, Nihal Singh Atariwala, a favourite Sardar of Maharaja Ranjit Singh, crossed the Sutlej and surrounded his lands. At this time, the British East India Company began offering protection to Trans-Sutlej chiefs. Dhanna Singh accepted British protection, preventing Ranjit Singh from expanding eastward.

Dhanna Singh died in 1818–19, and his widow Lachhman Kaur succeeded him. She died in 1835 without an heir, after which the British took control of Ferozepur Jagir.

=== First Sikh War ===
The First Anglo-Sikh War was mainly fought in Ferozepur district. The Sikh leadership was divided and could not properly lead the Khalsa Army of Ranjit Singh. The Sikhs crossed the Sutlej River to fight the British but were often let down by their commanders.

The first battle was at Mudki, where victory was close, but Sikh commander Lal Singh abandoned his troops. At Ferozeshah, another Sikh leader, Teja Singh, fled when victory was near, saving the British from defeat. Later, Sikh commander Ranjhor Singh won at Baddowal but lost at Aliwal. At the decisive battle of Sobraon, Gulab Singh betrayed the Sikhs by giving the British their battle plans three day before the battle. During the fight, Teja Singh again fled, causing a Sikh defeat.

=== British Period ===
Map of Firozpur District, ca 1849– 1870.

The Treaty of Lahore was signed in 1846, and as a result, the British took control of all the land east of the Sutlej River. This land was divided among the districts of Ferozepur, Badhni, and Ludhiana. Ferozepur district received the areas of Zira, Mudki, Khai, and parts of Kot Kapura, Guru Har Sahai, Jhumba, Kot Bhai, Bhucho, and Meharaj. In 1847, the Badhni district was dissolved, and its areas—Mallanwala, Makhu, Dharmkot, Kot Isa Khan, Badhni, Chuhar Chak, Mari, and Sada Singh Wala—were added to Ferozepur district. Sultankhanwala was also taken from Faridkot State in exchange. In 1852, parts of Muktsar and Kot Kapura were added to Ferozepur. In 1855, the area of Chirk was returned to Kalsia State.

In 1856, the Nawab of Mamdot was removed because of his and his son's wrongdoings, and his lands were added to Ferozepur district. In 1884, Sirsa district was divided, and the western part, including Fazilka tehsil and about 40 villages of Dabwali tehsil, became part of Ferozepur district.

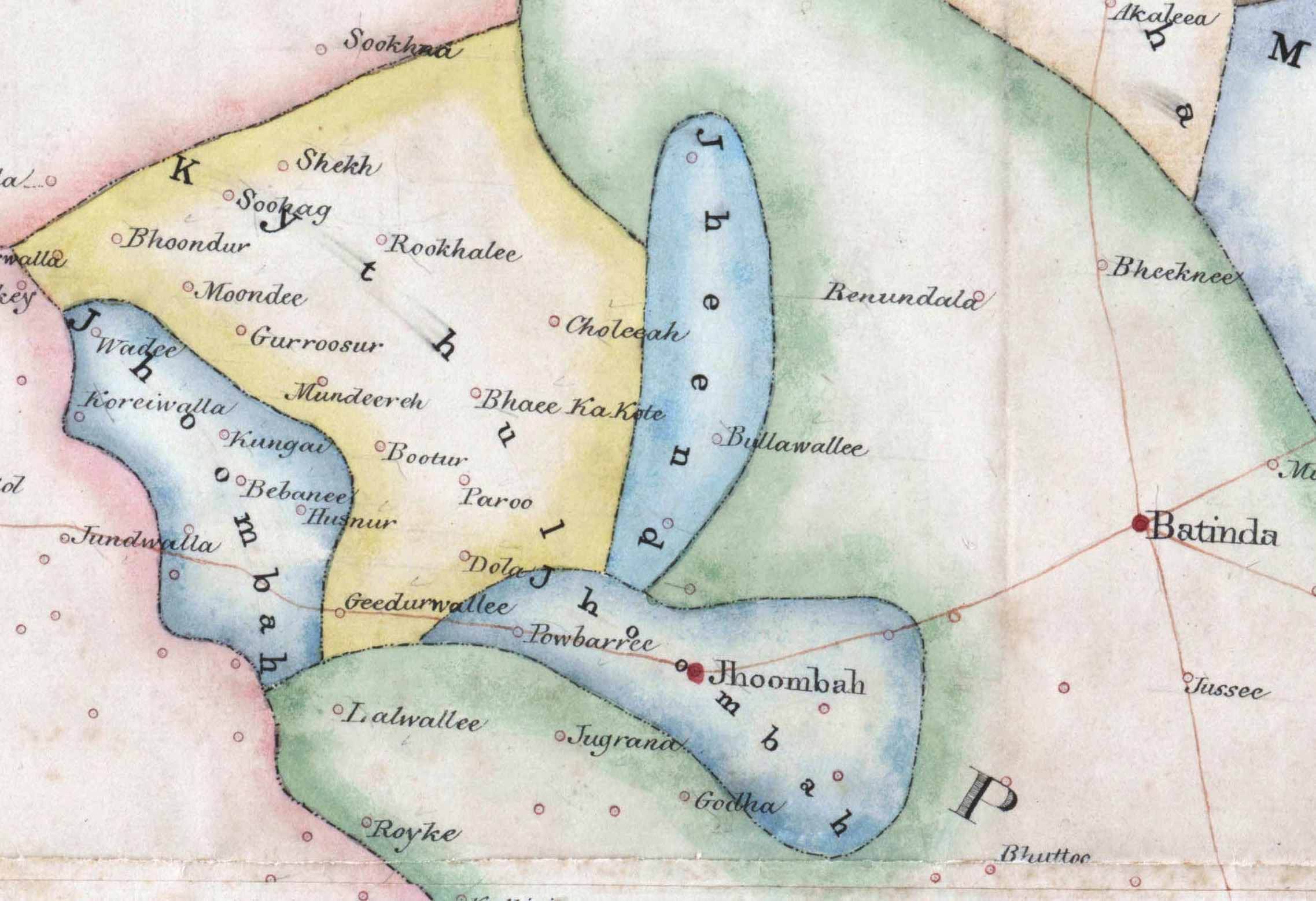
Map showing Jhumba Estate — Ca. 1829–35 (cropped from original)

The Guru of Guru Har Sahai and the Bhai of Jhumba and Bhai of Arnauli, in the Kot Bhai area, were given the title of jagirdars when Punjab was annexed by the British in 1846. They continued to collect their share of revenue in the form of crops until the 1872 land settlement.

Mahraj Ilaka was a group of 38 villages that formed a British-administered exclave of Ferzopur district, entirely surrounded by Phulkia & Faridkot states during the British era. The Charik Ilaka, a group of 7 villages, was an enclave within the district and an exclave of Kalsia State.

=== Modern Period ===
Following the Partition of Punjab Province, Ferozepur district became part of India. Amid the communal violence and mass migrations, a total of 349,767 sikh, hindu refugees from areas that became part of Pakistan settled in Ferozepur district, by 1951 Census. Much of this refugee population hailed from Bahawalpur State and the districts of Montgomery, Sheikhupura, Lyallpur, and Lahore, crossing the border into Ferozepur.

Faridkot State, accepted dominion of the Indian Union and became a tehsil of Bathinda district. Bathinda district itself became part of the PEPSU in 1948, which was later merged into the state of Punjab in 1956. While the Charik area—an exclave of Kalsia State and an enclave of Ferozpur's Moga tehsil—also became part of Bathinda district, it was transferred to Moga tehsil of Ferozepur district in 1950 by Absorption of Enclaves Order. Additionally, the Maharaj-Nathana ilaqa, a group of 38 villages that formed an exclave of Ferozepur District and was transferred to Bathinda district in 1959.

In 1960, two villages—Mohd. Yar Chishti and Chak Mohd. Usman—of Fazilka tehsil in Ferozepur district were completely transferred to Pakistan, along with parts of 12 other villages that had no population. Later, in 1970, Jhumba along with seven villages was transferred to Bathinda district.

In 1972, a new Faridkot district was created by combining Faridkot tehsil (from Bathinda district) and the Moga and Muktsar tehsils (from Ferozepur district). Later, in 1995, Moga & Mukatsar of Faridkot district was carved out to form the new Moga district. In 1999, Moga district expanded by gaining the Dharamkot block from Zira tehsil of Ferozepur district. This included 45 villages from Zira tehsil and 47 villages from Makhu sub-tehsil, along with the entire Dharamkot sub-tehsil of Zira tehsil of Ferozepur district.

Later, in 2011, Ferozepur district had six tehsils: Fazilka, Abohar, Jalalabad, Ferozepur, Zira. From these, Abohar and Fazilka tehsils, along with a part of Jalalabad tehsil, were separated to form the new Fazilka district. The remaining portion of Jalalabad tehsil was reorganized to create the new Guru Har Sahai tehsil within Ferozepur district.

== Administration ==
The district is administratively into the following tehsils & block

- Firozpur – Firozpur, Ghall Khurd (block)
- Zira – Makhu, Zira (block)
- Guru Har Sahai – Guru Har Sahai, Mamdot (block)

=== Subdistricts of Firozpur district ===
According to the Indian government's integrated online directory, Firozpur district is divided into the following subdistricts (tehsils/subdivisions) and blocks:

- Subdistricts
  1. Firozpur
  2. Guruharsahai
  3. Zira
- Blocks:
  1. Firozpur
  2. Ghall Khurd
  3. Guru Har Sahai
  4. Makhu
  5. Mamdot
  6. Zira

== Demographics ==
According to the 2011 Census the undivided Firozpur district had a population of 2,029,074. This gives it a ranking of 230th in India (out of a total of 640). The district has a population density of 380 inhabitants per square kilometre (980/sq mi). Its population growth rate over the decade 2001–2011 was 16.08%. Firozpur has a sex ratio of 893 females for every 1000 males, and a literacy rate of 69.8%. (This data is before the creation of Fazilka district.)

After bifurcation of Fazilika district, the residual district has a population of 1,001,931. Scheduled Castes made up 42.85% of the population.

=== Gender ===
The table below shows the sex ratio of Firozpur district through decades.

Sex ratio of Firozpur district
Census Year	1901	1911	1921	1931	1941	1951	1961	1971	1981	1991	2001	2011
Sex Ratio	826	778	802	814	810	835	840	876	884	895	885	893

The table below shows the child sex ratio of children below the age of 6 years in the rural and urban areas of Firozpur district.

Child sex ratio of children below the age of 6 years in Firozpur district
Year	Urban	Rural
2011	838	845
2001	813	825

=== Religion ===
Religion in New Firozpur district (2011) (Note: After creation of Fazilka district carved out of Firozpur, new Firozpur district consists of Zira and Firozpur tehsils.)
Religion	Percent
Sikhism	68.59%
Hinduism	28.83%
Christianity	1.83%
Other or not stated	0.75%

Religion in with Firozpur District (with Fazlika District)
Religious group	2011	
Religious group	Pop.	%
Sikhism	1,090,815	53.76%
Hinduism	906,408	44.67%
Christianity	19,358	0.95%
Islam	6,844	0.34%
Jainism	1,143	0.06%
Buddhism	454	0.02%
Others	4,052	0.2%
Total Population	2,029,074	100%

Religious groups in Firozpur District (British Punjab province era)
Religious group	1881		1891		1901		1911		1921		1931		1941	
Religious group	Pop.	%	Pop.	%	Pop.	%	Pop.	%	Pop.	%	Pop.	%	Pop.	%
Islam	310,552	47.74%	404,977	45.67%	447,615	46.72%	418,553	43.61%	482,540	43.94%	515,430	44.56%	641,448	45.07%
Sikhism	168,816	25.95%	226,361	25.53%	228,355	23.83%	262,511	27.35%	302,761	27.57%	388,108	33.55%	479,486	33.69%
Hinduism (Note: 1931–1941: Including Ad-Dharmis)	168,645	25.92%	252,200	28.44%	279,099	29.13%	273,832	28.53%	306,350	27.89%	244,688	21.15%	287,733	20.22%
Christianity	1,686	0.26%	1,738	0.2%	1,908	0.2%	3,342	0.35%	5,365	0.49%	7,070	0.61%	12,607	0.89%
Jainism	811	0.12%	1,381	0.16%	1,090	0.11%	1,401	0.15%	1,211	0.11%	1,411	0.12%	1,674	0.12%
Zoroastrianism	9	0%	17	0%	4	0%	18	0%	15	0%	24	0%	28	0%
Buddhism	0	0%	0	0%	0	0%	0	0%	6	0%	1	0%	1	0%
Judaism	—N/a	—N/a	0	0%	0	0%	0	0%	0	0%	0	0%	13	0%
Others	0	0%	2	0%	1	0%	0	0%	0	0%	0	0%	86	0.01%
Total population	650,519	100%	886,676	100%	958,072	100%	959,657	100%	1,098,248	100%	1,156,732	100%	1,423,076	100%
Note: British Punjab province era district borders are not an exact match in the present-day due to various bifurcations to district borders — which since created new districts — throughout the historic Punjab Province region during the post-independence era that have taken into account population increases.

Religion in the Tehsils of Firozpur District (1941)
Tehsil	Hinduism		Islam		Sikhism		Christianity		Jainism		Others (Note: Including Anglo-Indian Christians, British Christians, Buddhism, Zoroastrianism, Judaism, Tribals, others, or not stated)		Total	
Tehsil	Pop.	%	Pop.	%	Pop.	%	Pop.	%	Pop.	%	Pop.	%	Pop.	%
Firozpur Tehsil	53,520	18.44%	160,371	55.25%	70,782	24.38%	3,847	1.33%	745	0.26%	1,021	0.35%	290,286	100%
Zira Tehsil	18,863	8.95%	137,586	65.26%	50,209	23.82%	3,801	1.8%	349	0.17%	11	0.01%	210,819	100%
Moga Tehsil	30,531	10.91%	66,855	23.9%	181,454	64.86%	823	0.29%	32	0.01%	68	0.02%	279,763	100%
Muktsar Tehsil	46,169	17.13%	115,350	42.79%	106,270	39.42%	948	0.35%	313	0.12%	529	0.2%	269,579	100%
Fazilka Tehsil	138,650	37.21%	161,286	43.28%	70,771	18.99%	1,612	0.43%	235	0.06%	75	0.02%	372,629	100%
Note1: British Punjab province era tehsil borders are not an exact match in the present-day due to various bifurcations to tehsil borders — which since created new tehsils — throughout the historic Punjab Province region during the post-independence era that have taken into account population increases. Note2: Tehsil religious breakdown figures for Christianity only includes local Christians, labeled as "Indian Christians" on census. Does not include Anglo-Indian Christians or British Christians, who were classified under "Other" category.

Religion in the Tehsils of Firozpur District (1921)
Tehsil	Hinduism		Islam		Sikhism		Christianity		Jainism		Others (Note: Including Buddhism, Zoroastrianism, Judaism, Tribals, others, or not stated)		Total	
Tehsil	Pop.	%	Pop.	%	Pop.	%	Pop.	%	Pop.	%	Pop.	%	Pop.	%
Firozpur Tehsil	56,486	25.47%	115,506	52.09%	46,535	20.99%	2,655	1.2%	534	0.24%	21	0.01%	221,737	100%
Zira Tehsil	27,037	16.25%	105,123	63.19%	33,296	20.01%	628	0.38%	289	0.17%	0	0%	166,373	100%
Moga Tehsil	41,074	19.6%	50,188	23.95%	117,503	56.07%	767	0.37%	26	0.01%	0	0%	209,558	100%
Muktsar Tehsil	54,266	25.88%	88,029	41.99%	66,408	31.68%	603	0.29%	339	0.16%	0	0%	209,645	100%
Fazilka Tehsil	127,487	43.82%	123,694	42.52%	39,019	13.41%	712	0.24%	23	0.01%	0	0%	290,935	100%
Note: British Punjab province era tehsil borders are not an exact match in the present-day due to various bifurcations to tehsil borders — which since created new tehsils — throughout the historic Punjab Province region during the post-independence era that have taken into account population increases.

=== Language ===
Languages of Firozpur district (2011) (Note: Similar process to religion above)
1. Punjabi (93.0%)
2. Rajasthani (5.67%)
3. Others (1.32%)

At the time of the 2011 census, 93.01% of the population spoke Punjabi and 5.67% Rajasthani as their first language.

== Health ==
The table below shows the number of road accidents and people affected in Firozpur district by year.

Road accidents and people affected in Firozpur district by year
Year	Accidents	Killed	Injured	Vehicles Involved
2022	155	134	55	155
2021	179	152	68	124
2020	150	119	64	123
2019	163	136	36	126

== Politics ==
No.	Constituency	Name of MLA	Party	Bench
75	Zira	Naresh Kataria	Aam Aadmi Party	Government
76	Firozpur City	Ranveer Singh Bhullar	Aam Aadmi Party	Government
77	Firozpur Rural (SC)	Rajnish Dahiya	Aam Aadmi Party	Government
78	Guru Har Sahai	Fauja Singh Srari	Aam Aadmi Party	Government

== Land and genealogical records ==
Shajjra Nasb (also known as Kursee Nama (Note: Also spelt as 'Shajra Nasab'. Kursee Nama is also spelt as 'Kurseenama' or 'Kursinama'.)) records of some villages of Firozpur district from 1887–1958 have been digitized by the Church of Jesus Christ of Latter-day Saints via FamilySearch and are available for online viewing. These records detail land ownership pedigrees for families of the village. The genealogical importance of such records for the purpose of family history research was raised by Gurcharan Singh Gill of Moga. Gill discovered in 1986 that tax-records in the district were attached to a genealogical pedigree going back four generations. These records have been described as being one of the few surviving records of Punjabi genealogy, as census records in India were rarely preserved. The more recent records were written in Punjabi using Gurmukhi script and the older records were written in Urdu in Nastaliq script. The names of more than 250,000 individuals have been extracted from the records by Gill.

== Notable people ==
- Mohinder Singh Randhawa, a historian, civil servant, botanist, and author
- Harvinder Sahota, an Indian American cardiologist, researcher and inventor, known for the invention of Perfusion Balloon Angioplasty known as "Sahota Perfusion Balloon"
- Kamaljeet Sandhu, an athlete, first Indian woman to win an individual gold medal in Asian Games and receiver of Padma Shri award.
- Man Mohan Sondhi, researcher in speech processing and signal processing who worked at Bell Laboratories, famous for his research on echo cancellation.
- Bhai Nirmal Singh Khalsa, first Hazoori Ragi to awarded the Padma Shri, highly regarded ragi with knowledge of all 31 Raags of Guru Granth Sahib.
- Sada Kaur, Rani of Sarkar-e-Khalsa.
- Gerry Whent, founder and first chief executive of Vodafone.
- Mahabali Shera, Indian professional wrestler.
- Bano Qudsia, a Pakistani novelist, playwright and spiritualist
- Verma Malik, an active freedom fighter during the British Raj, a lyricist in bollywood and punjabi movies, poet.
- Frederick Currie (cricketer), an English first-class cricketer and British Army officer.

== Gallery ==
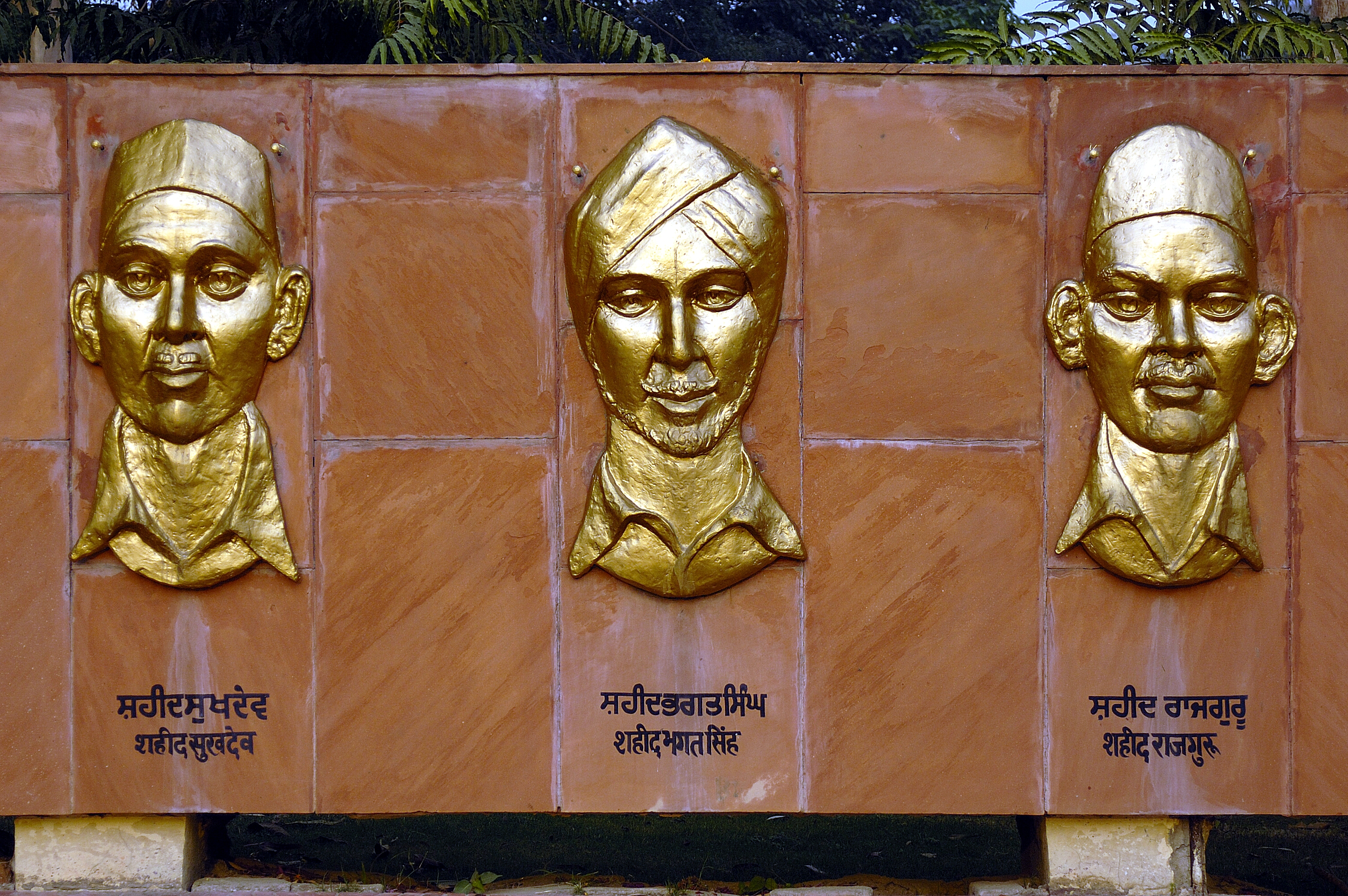
National Martyrs Memorial Hussainiwala

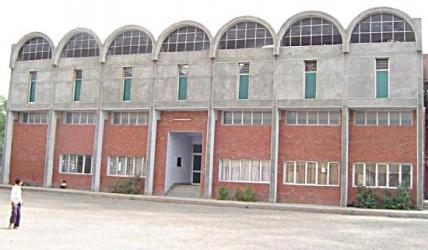
Shaheed Bhagat Singh Stadium Firozpur.

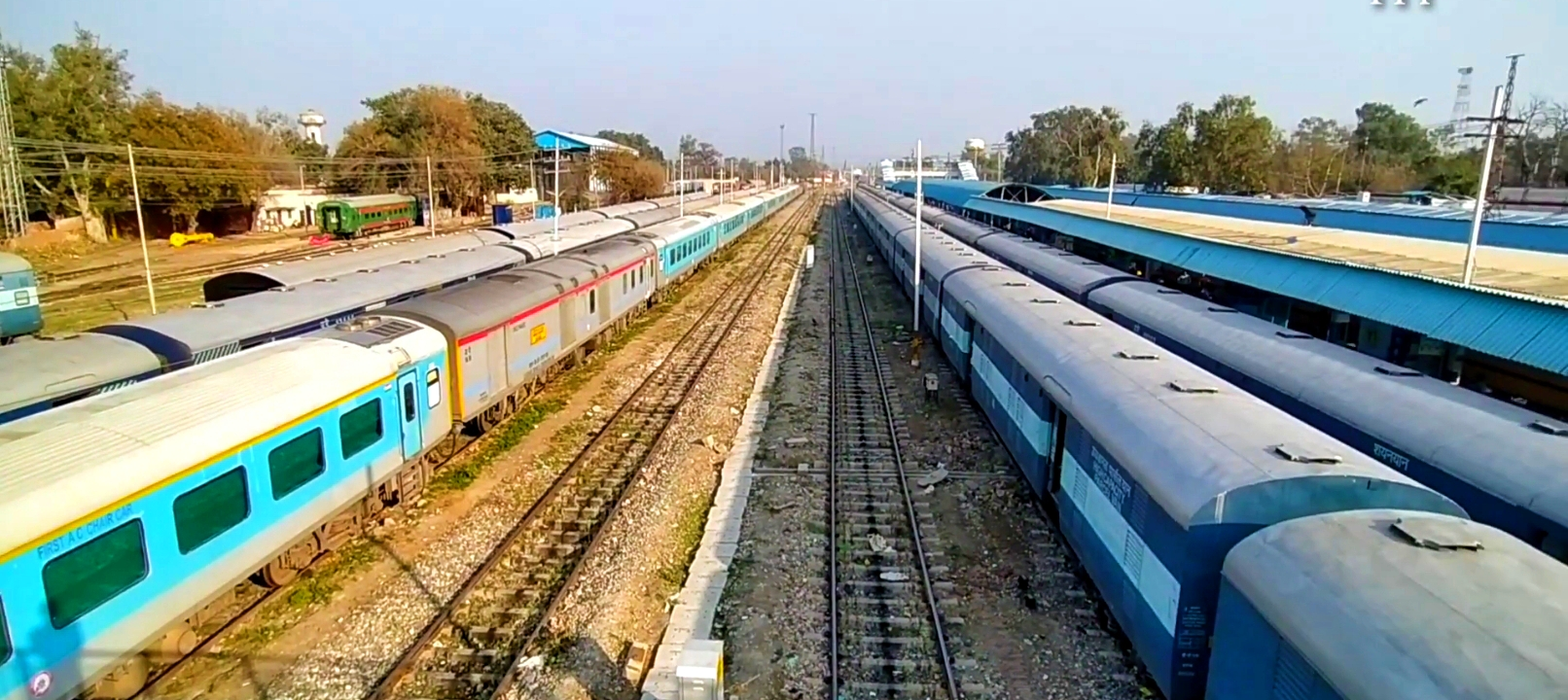
Firozpur Cantt Railway Station

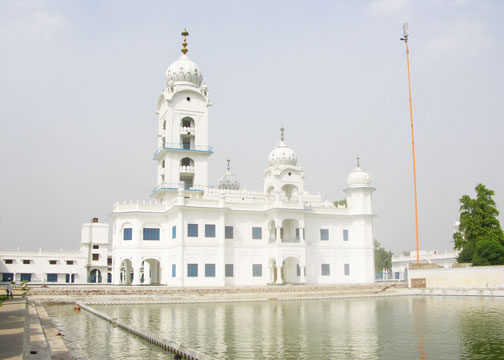
Gurudwara Jamni Sahib Bazidpur, Firozpur District.

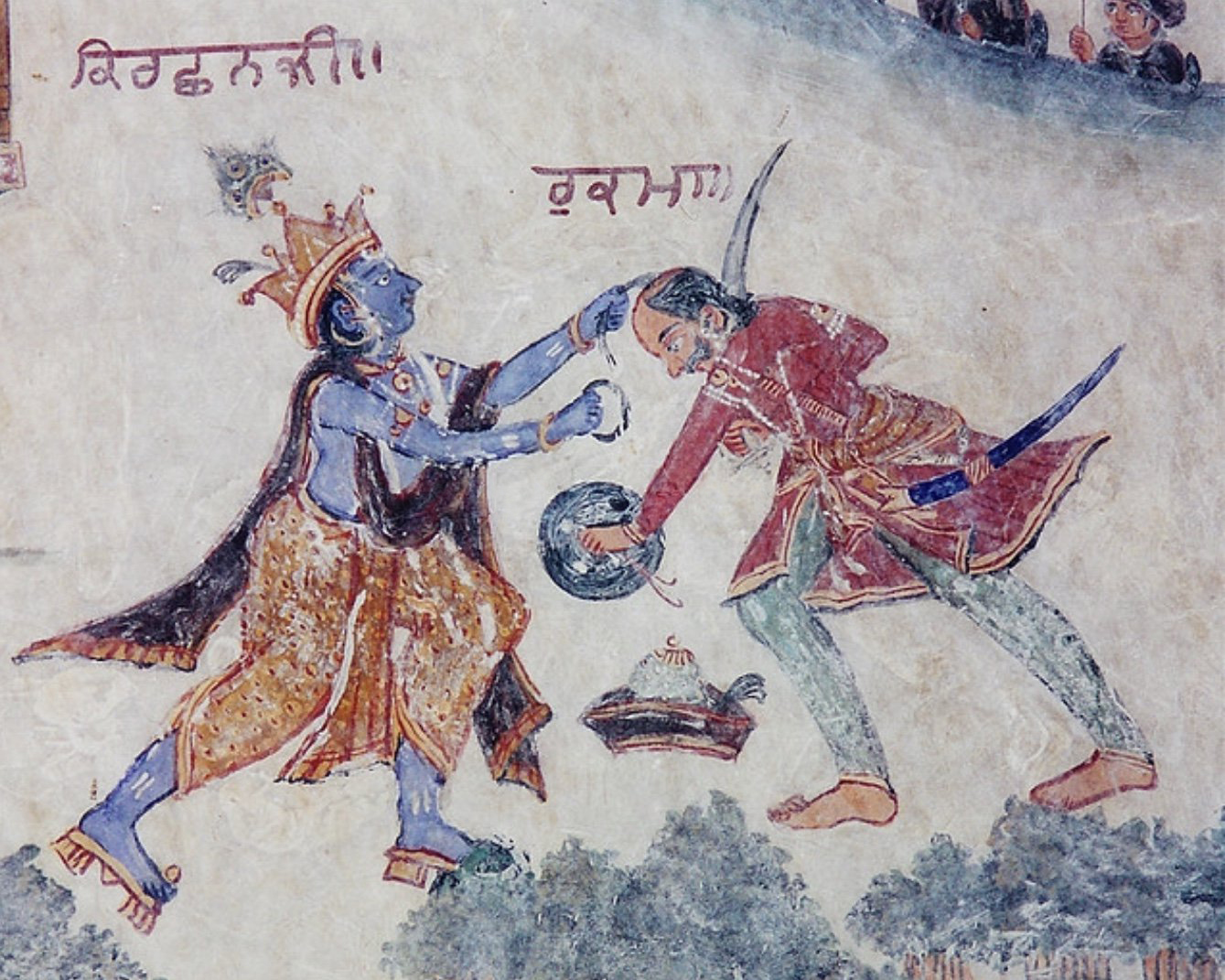
Punjabi fresco from Ferozepur district.

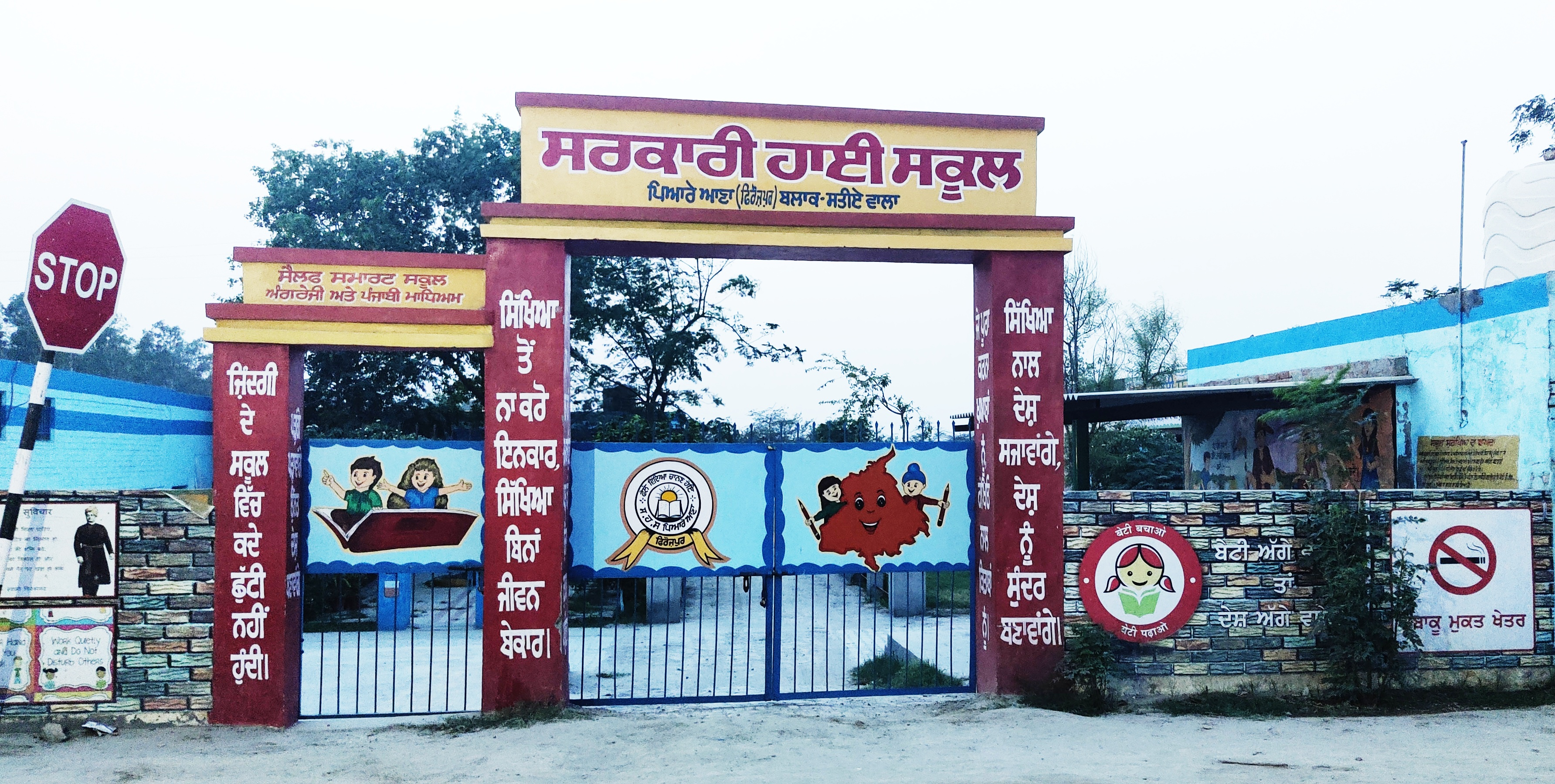
Entrance of Govt. High School Pyareana (Firozepur)

== See also ==
- Ferozepore (jagir)
- Bathinda district
- Moga district
- Faridkot district
