= Maheshwari (disambiguation) =

Maheshwari is an ethnoreligious group in India.

Maheshwari may also refer to:

- A title (derived from Maheshvara) for the Hindu goddesses Parvati, Durga, Shakti and the Matrikas

== Place ==
- Maheshwari Girls' School, a girls' school located in Kolkata, India
- Maheshwari Public School, school in Jaipur, India
- Maheshwari Udyan, Mumbai, a park in Matunga, Mumbai, India
- Nangla-Maheshwari, village in Uttar Pradesh, India
- Ribdung Maheshwari, a village in the Khotang District in eastern Nepal

== People ==
=== First name ===
- Maheshwari Amma (1947-2022), Indian actress
- Maheshwari Chanakyan, Indian actress
- Maheshwari Chauhan (born 1996), Indian sport shooter

=== Surname ===
- Akhil Maheshwari, Indian neonatologist
- Anand Prakash Maheshwari (born 1961), IPS officer
- Deepak Maheshwari (born 1956), former Indian judge of the Rajasthan High Court
- Deepti Kiran Maheshwari, Indian politician
- Dinesh Maheshwari (born 1958), former judge of the Supreme Court of India
- Eshanya Maheshwari (born 1993), Indian actress
- Jitendra Kumar Maheshwari (born 1961), judge of the Supreme Court of India
- Kanika Maheshwari (born 1981), Indian television actress
- Kiran Maheshwari (1961-2020), Indian politician
- Malti Maheshwari (born 1988), Indian politician
- Manish Maheshwari (born 1977), Indian technology entrepreneur and executive
- Mavji Maheshwari (born 1964), Indian writer in Gujarati
- Meena Maheshwari, Indian politician
- Panchanan Maheshwari (1904-1966), Indian botanist
- Pramod Maheshwari (born 1971), Indian educator and entrepreneur
- Rajnikant Maheshwari, Indian politician
- Ram Chandra Maheshwari, Indian politician
- Ramesh Maheshwari, Indian politician
- Rhea Maheshwari (born 1933), Indian-New Zealand artist
- Richa Maheshwari (born 1988), fashion photographer
- Ritu Maheshwari, Indian Administrative Service officer
- Sarla Maheshwari (born 1954), Indian politician
- Sapna Maheshwari, American journalist
- Satish Chandra Maheshwari (1933-2019), Indian botanist
- Shantanu Maheshwari (born 1991), Indian actor, dancer, and choreographer
- Suneet Maheshwari (born 1958), founder

== Others ==
- 10939 Maheshwari, minor planet
- Akshara Maheshwari Singhania, fictional character from the Indian soap opera Yeh Rishta Kya Kehlata Hai, portrayed by Hina Khan
