= Nangal (disambiguation) =

Nangal is a town in Rupnagar district, Punjab, India.

Nangal may also refer to the following villages in Punjab, India:

- Nangal, Jalandhar
- Nangal, Nihal Singh Wala
- Nangal, Phagwara
- Nangal, Zira

== See also ==
- Naya Nangal (lit. 'New Nangal'), a town in Punjab, India
- Nangli (disambiguation)
- Nangla, village in Punjab, India
- Nangla-Maheshwari, village in Uttar Pradesh, India
- Nangla Badi, village in Uttar Pradesh, India
- Nagla, a town in Uttarakhand, India
