= Nangli =

Nangli or Nangali may refer to these places in India:

- Nangali, a village in Kolar district, Karnataka, India
- Nangli, Amritsar, a village in Punjab, India
- Nangli Godha, a village in Rewari District, Haryana, India
- Nangli Parsapur, a village in Rewari District, Haryana, India
- Nangli Poona, a village in northwest Delhi, India
- Nangli, Rajasthan, a village in Alwar District, Rajasthan, India
- Nangli Sakrawati, a village in southwest Delhi, India
- Nangli Saledi Singh, a village in Rajasthan, India
- Nangli Wazidpur, a village in Uttar Pradesh
- Raipur Nangli, a village in Uttar Pradesh, India
- Nangli metro station, Delhi Metro

== See also ==
- Nangal (disambiguation)
