= Akila =

Akila may refer to:

== Places ==
- Acila or Ocelis, an ancient town in Yemen

== People ==
- Akila Dananjaya (born 1993), Sri Lankan cricketer
- Akila Ellawala (born 1976), Sri Lankan politician
- Akila Isanka (born 1989), Sri Lankan cricketer
- Akila Jayasundera (born 1992), Sri Lankan cricketer
- Akila Viraj Kariyawasam (born 1973), Sri Lankan politician
- Akila Lakshan (born 1995), Sri Lankan cricketer
- Akila Radhakrishnan (born 1982), American lawyer

== See also ==
- Akela (disambiguation)
- Akhila
- Akil (disambiguation)
- Akilah (disambiguation)
- Akilan
- Akeelah and the Bee
