= Akhil =

Unisex given name

- Pronunciation: अखिल
- Gender: Male

Origin
- Origin: Sanskrit and other languages of India
- Meaning: "entire", "whole"
- Region of origin: India

Other names
- Related names: Nikhil, Akhila

Akhil (in Devanagari: अखिल, IAST: akhila) is a given name of Sanskrit origin, meaning 'entire' or 'whole'. The equivalent feminine name is Akhila (IAST: akhilā).

People with this name include:

- Akhil (singer) (born 1990), Indian actor, singer, and songwriter
- Akhil (Tamil actor), Indian actor in Tamil cinema
- Akhil (Telugu actor), Indian actor in Telugu cinema
- Akhil Akkineni, American-born Indian actor
- Akhil Amar (born 1958), Indian-American legal scholar
- Akhil Chandra Banerjea, Indian virologist
- Akhil Datta-Gupta, American academic
- Akhil George, Indian cinematographer
- Akhil Giri, Indian politician
- Akhil Gogoi (born 1976), Indian political activist
- Akhil Gupta (born 1959), Indian anthropologist
- Akhil Herwadkar, Indian cricketer
- Akhil Iyer, Indian actor
- Akhil Kapur, Indian actor
- Akhil Katyal, Indian poet, translator, and queer activist
- Akhil Kumar (born 1981), Indian boxer
- Akhil Maheshwari, American neonatologist
- Akhil Mehta (1987–2015), Indian businessman
- Akhil Mishra, Indian actor
- Akhil Niyogi, Indian Bengali-language children's writer and editor
- Akhil Patel, English cricketer
- Akhil Rabindra (born 1996), Indian racing driver
- Akhil Rajput, Indian cricketer
- Akhil Ranjan Chakravarty, Indian organic chemist
- Akhil Reed Amar, American legal scholar
- Akhil Sachdeva, Indian musician
- Akhil Sharma (born 1971), Indian writer

== See also ==
- Akilan (1922–1998), Indian writer of Tamil literature
- Akhila (disambiguation), the feminine equivalent of Akhil
- Central Cee, a British rapper who claimed to have legally changed his name to Akhil after converting to Islam.
