= Akilah =

Akilah may refer to

- Akilah!, 1972 Jazz album by Melvin Sparks
- Akilah Hospital, Hospital in Jordan
- Akilah Institute, College in Rwanda
- Azra Kohen (born 1979), Turkish writer known as Akilah

== See also ==
- Akhila, a given name
- Akila (disambiguation)
- Akilam, an Ayyavazhi text
- Akilan, a Tamil author
- Akeelah and the Bee, a 2006 American drama film
