= Srinivas =

Srinivasa (Sanskrit श्रीनिवास) is a Hindu name. The term Srinivasa is Vaishnava in origin, the combination of two Sanskrit words, Shri (श्री) and nivasa (निवास).

It is a name for males in India as well as a family surname. Shrinivasan (श्रीनिवासन्) is the singular nominative form, and along with its variants Srinivasan, Srinivas, and others, is used as a forename or surname.

== Etymology ==
Shri means "radiance" or "prosperity"; nivasa means "abode" or "residence", which is considered to be the source of light (as a metaphor for life) in Hindu scriptures. Shri is also an epithet of Lakshmi who is the consort associated with Venkateshvara, and often described to be embodied within him. Hence, the alternative meaning of this name is: "one within whom Lakshmi (Sri) lives".

== Variants ==
Srinivas is the northern Indian variant of the original Sanskrit name Srinivasa, employed after the schwa-deletion in the Indo-Aryan languages.

The use of the name Srinivasan (also rendered Sreenivasan) is common in Tamil Nadu and Kerala. Similarly, the dialectical word, Srinivasulu, is commonly used in Andhra Pradesh and Telangana. The name is also very much prevalent in Odisha, Maharashtra and Karnataka, among other parts of India.

The other variants in English spelling include Sreenivas, Shrinivas, Shreenivas, Srinibas, Shrinibas.

== Notable people ==
=== As first name ===
- Srinivasa Ramanujan, Indian mathematician
- Srinivas, 1990s Tamil Nadu playback singer, also known as Srinivasan Doraiswamy
- Srinivasan, also known as "Powerstar", Tamil comedian
- Sreenivasan, Malayalam script writer and actor
- Srinivas Avasarala, actor
- Srinivasan Keshav, scientist
- Srinivas Kumar Sinha (1926–2016), Indian soldier
- Srinivasaraghavan Venkataraghavan, Indian cricketer

=== As middle name ===
- Ullal Srinivas Mallya (1902–1965), Indian politician
- Vaman Srinivas Kudva (1899–1967), Indian businessman

=== As last name ===
- Adithya Srinivasan, Ghazal singer and global business development leader
- Akhila Srinivasan, Indian businesswoman
- Amia Srinivasan, British philosopher and author
- Balaji Srinivasan (born 1980), American entrepreneur and investor
- Bhama Srinivasan (1935–2025), Indian-American mathematician
- Dharmapuri Srinivas (1948–2024), Indian politician
- Dipti Srinivasan, Singaporean electrical engineer
- Grandhi Srinivas, Indian politician
- Gopalakrishnan Srinivasan, Indian Computer Scientist and Assistant Professor at IIT-Madras (BrainSeek/RISE Lab)
- Hari Sreenivasan (born 1974), Indian-American TV journalist
- Kamineni Srinivas, Indian politician
- Kannan Srinivasan, Indian-American politician in Virginia
- Krishnan Srinivasan, Indian diplomat
- M. B. Sreenivasan (Manamadurai Balakrishnan known as MBS, 1925–1988), Indian music director
- Megan Srinivas, American member of the Iowa House of Representatives
- M. N. Srinivas (Mysore Narasimhachar, 1916–1999), Indian sociologist
- Madapuji Rajagopalan Srinivasan (born 1967), usually cited as M.R. Srinivasan, head of Agricultural Entomology at the Agricultural College and Research Institute of Tamil Nadu Agricultural University. He has published works on both Apis cerana and Apis mellifera (western honey bee).
- Madapusi Srinivasaprasad, Indian cricketer
- Mandyam Veerambudi Srinivasan ("Srini"), usually cited as M.V. Srinivasan (born 15 September 1948), bioengineer and neuroscientist, who studies visual systems, particularly those of Western honey bees (Apis mellifera) and birds; faculty member Queensland Brain Institute at the University of Queensland.
- N. Srinivasan (Narayanaswami, born 1945), Indian industrialist and chemical engineer
- P. Seenivasan, Indian politician, Deputy Speaker of the Tamil Nadu Legislative Assembly from 1971 to 1972
- P. Srinivas, Indian Forest Service officer
- P. B. Sreenivas (Prathivadi Bhayankara, 1930–2013), Indian playback singer
- R. Srinivasan, Indian politician, member of the Tamil Nadu Legislative Assembly
- Rangaswamy Srinivasan, scientist
- Rettamalai Srinivasan, Indian politician
- Shyam Srinivasan, Canadian professional midstakes poker player
- Sri Srinivasan, American judge
- Subramaniam Srinivasan, Indian filmmaker
- T. E. Srinivasan (Tirumalai Echambadi, 1950–2010), Indian cricketer
- T. N. Srinivasan (Thirukodikaval Nilakanta, 1933–2018), economist who worked in the US
- Thengai Srinivasan (1937–1987), Indian actor
- Trivikram Srinivas, Indian film director and screenwriter
- U. Srinivas (Uppalapu, 1969–2014), Indian mandolin player
- Vandemataram Srinivas, Indian music director, playback singer, actor and film director
- Vineeth Sreenivasan (born 1985), Indian playback singer, actor, film director, screenwriter, producer, lyricist, etc., working in Malayalam cinema, son of actor-screenwriter Sreenivasan.
- Yogi Srinivasan, Indian actor, son of Thengai Srinivasan

=== As pseudonym ===
- Shrinivási, Surinamese poet and teacher

== See also ==
- Venkateswara, Hindu deity
- Srinivasa Rao, disambiguation page
