= Machhike =

- Location within Punjab
- Coordinates: 30.557°N 75.381°E
- Country: India
- State: Punjab
- District: Moga

Machhike is a village in the Moga District of the Indian state of Punjab. It is part of the Nihal Singh Wala Assembly Constituency.

== Geography ==
It is located 10 km southeast of Nihal Singh Wala, 38 km southeast of Moga, and 60 km southwest of Ludhiana. The Machhike local language is Punjabi.

== Demographics ==
In the 2011 census, the population was 6,411. There is a 56.6% literacy rate with a 24.3% female literacy rate.

2011 Census Data
	Total	Male	Female
Population	6,411	3,411	3,000
0–6 years old	661	347	314
Scheduled Castes	2,695	1,420	1,275
Scheduled Tribes	0	0	0
Literates	3,627	2,071	1,556
Illiterate	2,784	1,340	1,444
Total Workers	1,936	1,771	165
Main Worker	1,880	1,722	158
Main Worker - Cultivators	758	734	24
Main Worker - Agriculture Labourers	613	597	16
Main Worker - Household Industries	22	19	3
Main Worker - Other	487	372	115
Marginal Worker (total)	56	49	7
Non Worker	4,475	1,640	2,835

== Images ==
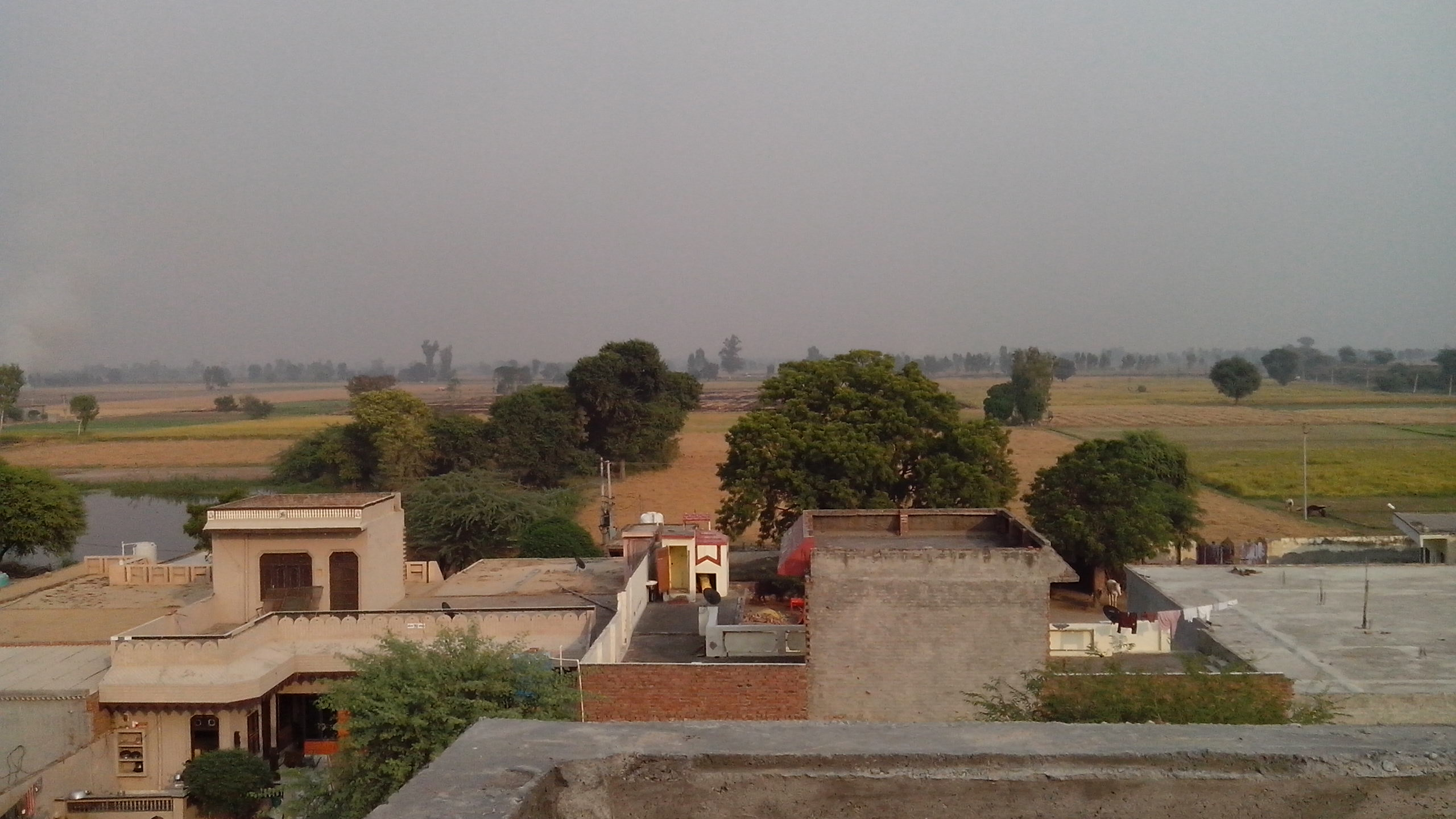
Machhike

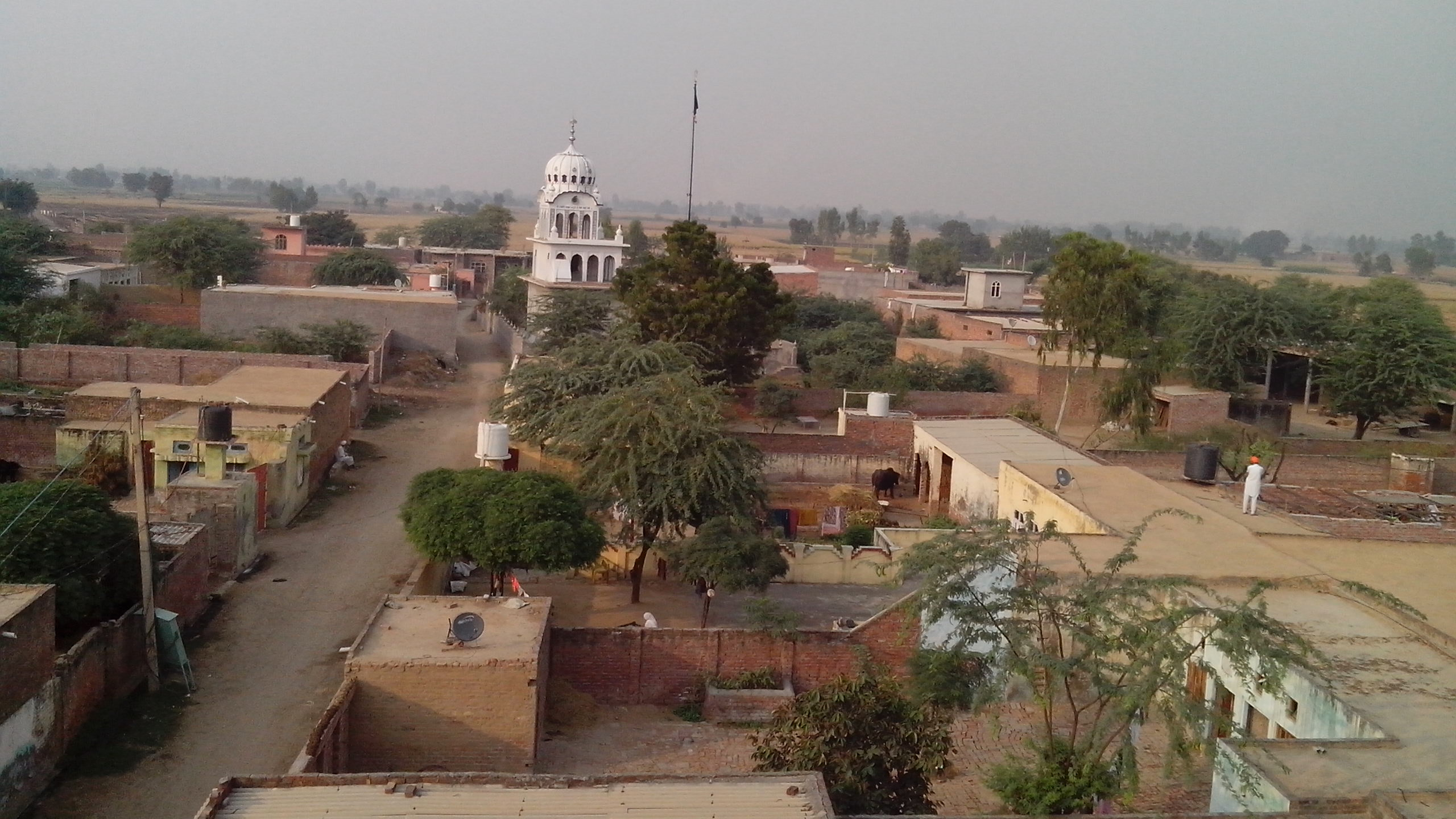
Machhike
