= Suneet =

Suneet (Devanagari: सुनीत) also written as Sunit, is an Indian masculine given name. It is a Sanskrit masculine word which means 'he who has good conducts/ethics' or 'he who is well mannered'.

- Suneet Chopra, Indian politician
- Suneet Maheshwari, entrepreneur
- Suneet Singh Tuli, entrepreneur
- Suneet Varma, Indian fashion designer
