= Akil =

Akil may refer to:

== Geography ==
- Akil, Yucatán, a town in Yucatán, Mexico

== Given name ==
- Akil Baddoo (born 1998), American baseball player
- Akil Blount (born 1994), American football player
- Akil Dhahar, Somalian leader
- Akil Mark Koci, Kosovar Albanian composer
- Akil Mitchell (born 1992), American-Panamanian basketball player
- Akil Wright (born 1996), English footballer

== Surname ==
- Ahmad Basri Akil (1939–2008), Malaysian football manager
- Huda Akil (born 1945) is a Syrian–American neuroscientist
- Mara Brock Akil (born 1970), American television writer and producer

== See also ==
- Aqil (disambiguation)
