= Helms Amendment to the Foreign Assistance Act =

Federal American legislation

The Helms Amendment to the Foreign Assistance Act, sometimes called simply the Helms Amendment, is a 1973 amendment, passed by the U.S. Congress in the wake of the Roe v. Wade decision by the United States Supreme Court, to limit the use of US foreign assistance for abortion.

Named after North Carolina senator Jesse Helms, the amendment states that "no foreign assistance funds may be used to pay for the performance of abortion as a method of family planning or to motivate or coerce any person to practice abortions."

== Background and passage ==
After the Supreme Court's landmark 1973 decision Roe v. Wade, anti-abortion activists began mobilizing at the federal level. One of the goals of the anti-abortion movement in the wake of Roe was to cut off all federal funding support for abortion care in order to reduce the availability of legal abortions. In the year after the decision, socially conservative, evangelical Protestants who were anti-abortion mobilized to an unprecedented extent, and pro-life lawmakers introduced a number of measures designed to cut off access to abortions in the United States and elsewhere.

Senator Jesse Helms, a prominent opponent of abortion, introduced his amendment to the Foreign Assistance Act during his first term in Congress. It prohibited the use of any U.S. foreign assistance funds for "abortion as a method of family planning". It eventually passed both houses of Congress and was signed into law on December 17, 1973. It has been interpreted by every administration since as an outright ban on funding abortions, including cases of rape, incest, and pregnancies that endanger the life of the mother. It is applied even to countries where abortion is completely legal.

== Effects ==
Despite its focus on "abortion as a method of family planning," American global health funding programs, such as USAID, currently interpret the Helms Amendment language to exclude funding for abortion services in cases not connected to family planning, such as rape, incest, or to save the life of the woman.

The Agency for International Development (AID) halted most abortion related activity due to the passing of the amendment, though they had previously been a very prominent supporter of abortion. This left the World Bank and The United Nations Fund for Population Activities as the only publicly open contributions of support.

The 1984 Mexico City Policy was an expansion of the Helms Amendment's restrictions. An executive order first issued by Ronald Reagan, it prohibited spending foreign aid money on any non-governmental organizations that provide services relating to abortions. The order was continued or re-instated by all subsequent Republican presidents and rescinded by all Democrats through to Joe Biden.

== Abortion ==
Several anti-abortion groups support the current interpretation of the Helms Amendment to exclude abortions for rape or incest, considering it an important ban on "taxpayer-funded abortions."

In 1990 Congress provided clarity on the amendment advising USAID programs are in fact allowed to provide counseling and information on all pregnancy options as long as the programs are following each countries' laws.

== Support and opposition ==
The amendment is supported by the United States Conference of Catholic Bishops and anti-abortion groups such as the Susan B. Anthony Pro-Life America

Several abortion-rights and human rights organizations, including Planned Parenthood, the Global Justice Center, Population Action International, the Center for Health and Gender Equity, Human Rights Watch, and Amnesty International USA pressured United States President Barack Obama to mitigate what they considered the harmful effects of the Helms Amendment. Population Action International, for example, stated that since the Helms Amendment restricts US funds for abortions "as a method of family planning," abortions "conducted as a result of rape, incest, and abortions to save women's lives, are eligible for U.S. support". The Center for Health and Gender Equity worked with other human rights and faith-based organizations in calling on President Obama to take executive action on the Helms Amendment for women raped in conflict. More than 100 Members of Congress also had called on President Obama to take action. One of the ways that President Obama could have taken action would have been through the issuance of a presidential memorandum but President Obama never issued a presidential memorandum on the Helms Amendment.

During the 2016 Democratic Presidential Primary, candidates (former) Secretary of State Hillary Clinton and U.S. Senator Bernie Sanders (I-VT) each pledged that as president they would take executive action on Helms and work to repeal the Amendment entirely.

== Possible repeal ==
Many women's rights and women's health advocates press for the repeal of the law. Approximately 47,000 women perish annually due to unsafe or illegal abortions, mostly in foreign countries. Many reported abortions in foreign countries are being performed in unsafe ways by people without proper qualifications and in places that are not fit to medical standards.

In 2021, more than 140 human rights and global health organizations called on Biden to permanently repeal the Helms amendment. The Guttmacher Institute estimated that repealing the Helms amendment could result in 19 million fewer unsafe abortions and 17,000 fewer maternal deaths a year.

== See also ==
- Hyde Amendment
- Dobbs v. Jackson Women's Health Organization
- Abortion debate in the United States
