= Akila Radhakrishnan =

Akila Radhakrishnan (born December 15, 1982) is a human rights lawyer and the President of the Global Justice Center (GJC). Prior to her work with the Global Justice Center, Radhakrishnan worked at the International Criminal Tribunal for the Former Yugoslavia, as well as with DPK Consulting and Drinker, Biddle & Reath, LLP.

== Education ==
Radhakrishnan received her B.A. in Art History and Political Science from the University of California, Davis and her J.D. from University of California, Hastings with a focus in International Law.

== Publications ==
- "Beyond the Coup in Myanmar: A Crisis Born from Impunity"
- "Abortion is a human right. A pandemic doesn't change that"
- "Trump’s Chilling Blow to the ICC"
- "Beyond Killing: The Critical Role of Gender in the Recognition, Prevention and Punishment of Genocide"
- "Foreign Policy, Akin-Style: How the U.S. Denies Abortions to Women Raped in War"
- "Burma's Hollow Reforms"
- "Not Only Voiceless, But Choice-less: The Impregnated Victims of Boko Haram"
- "The Cruelest Weapon"
- "With Trump Presidency, A Coming Collision With Global Standards on Torture, Abortion Rights"
- "How Obama Failed Women Raped in War"
- "Trump's Action on Reproductive Rights Abroad"
- "Why is the US Waging War on Women Raped in War"
- "Israel's invasion of Gaza in International Law"
- "Protecting Safe Abortion in Humanitarian Settings: Overcoming Legal and Policy Barriers"
- "If These Walls Could Talk, They Would Be Censored: U.S. Restrictions on Pro-Choice Speech"
