= Aqil =

Aqil may refer to:

== Given name ==
- Aqil Agha, semi-autonomous Arab ruler of northern Palestine
- Aqil Hussain Barlas, lawyer and diplomat
- Aqil Mammadov, Azerbaijani footballer
- Aqil Davidson
- Aqil Savik
- Aqil Yazid

== Surname ==
- Ibn Aqil, Muslim theologian
- Ibrahim Aqil, Hezbollah military leader

== Geography ==
- Aqil, Iran, a village in East Azerbaijan Province, Iran

== See also ==
- Akil (disambiguation)
