= Janet Benshoof =

American lawyer (1947–2017)

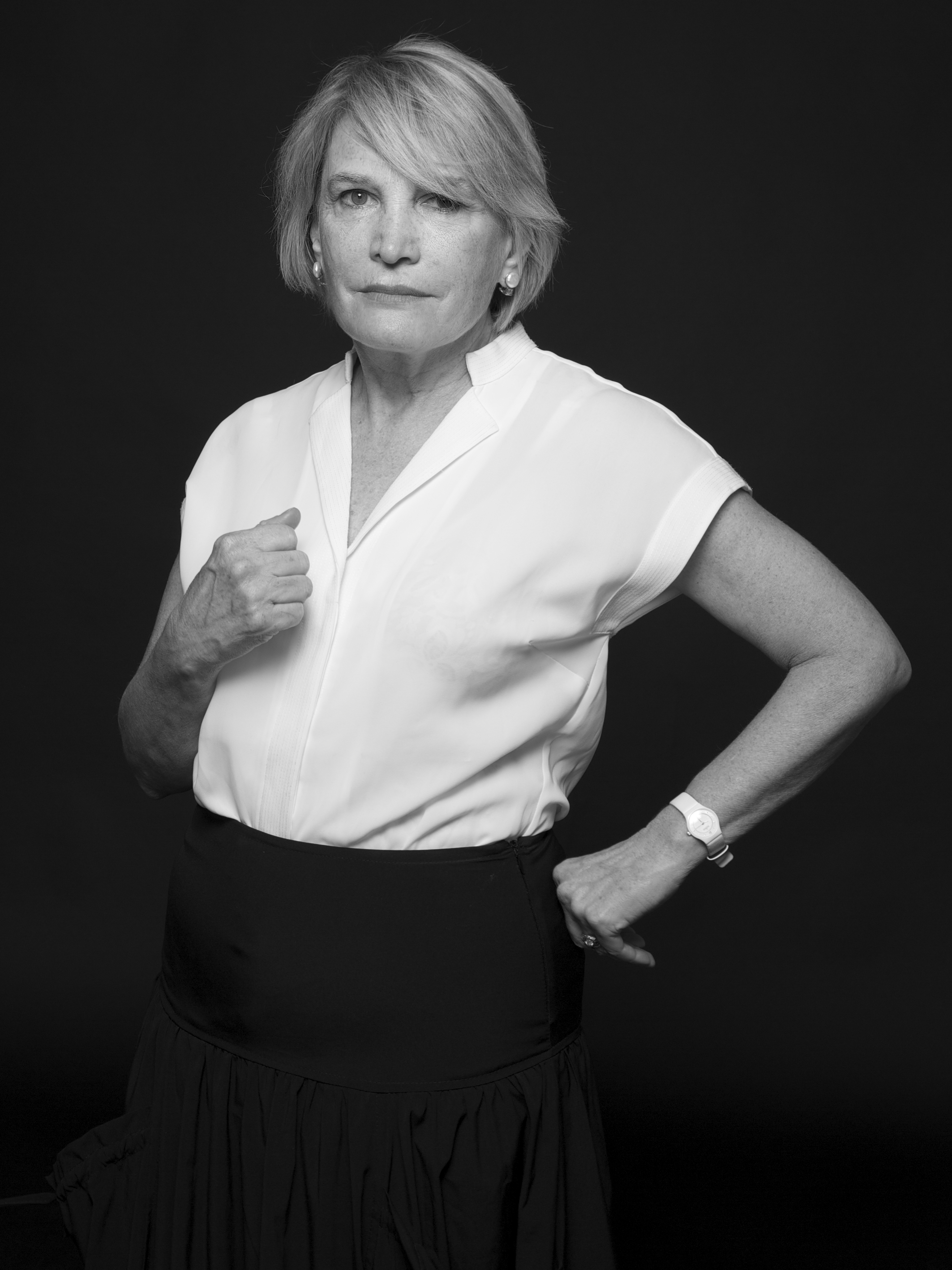
- Born: May 10, 1947; Detroit Lakes, Minnesota, U.S.
- Died: December 18, 2017 (aged 70); Manhattan, New York City, New York, U.S.
- Education: University of Minnesota, Harvard Law School
- Occupations: Lawyer, activist
- Known for: Center for Reproductive Rights, Global Justice Center
- Awards: MacArthur Fellows Program

Janet Benshoof (May 10, 1947 – December 18, 2017) was an American human rights lawyer and President and Founder of the Global Justice Center. She founded the Center for Reproductive Rights, the world's first international human rights organization focused on reproductive choice and equality.

== Education and academia ==
Benshoof received her B.A. in political science, summa cum laude, from the University of Minnesota in 1969, and her Juris Doctor from Harvard Law School in 1972, paying her tuition using money from a summer job at an A&W Root Beer stand.

She taught human rights law at Bard College and Harvard Law School and was a visiting lecturer at Yale, Columbia, Rutgers, Case Western Reserve, and Harvard Universities.

== Legal work ==
Benshoof established landmark legal precedents in the U.S. Supreme Court and international forums. Her successful legal efforts range from the approval of emergency contraception for women by the United States Food and Drug Administration (FDA), to the application of international rape law to ensure the rights of women in the Iraqi High Tribunal's prosecutions of Saddam-era war crimes. Her training on gender rights and international law at the Iraqi High Tribunal resulted in the first legal decision in the Middle East to confer women rights under international law.

She also lectured and trained women leaders, judges, parliamentarians, and various UN bodies on implementing international human rights laws (such as CEDAW) and international humanitarian law, including women's rights to criminal accountability under Security Council Resolutions and by the International Criminal Court.

She served for 15 years as director of the American Civil Liberties Union's Reproductive Freedom Project, which litigated cases dealing with gender equality, free speech, and reproductive choice. She was a member of the Council on Foreign Relations and its Burma Task Force and advised women from Burma, Kurdistan, and Iraq on constitutional drafting.

== Center for Reproductive Rights ==
In 1992, Benshoof left the ACLU to found the Center for Reproductive Law and Policy (now the Center for Reproductive Rights), the first international human rights organization focused on women's rights to equality; she served as its first president.

Under her leadership, the Center obtained consultative status to the United Nations, developed legal projects in more than 40 countries, and won major cases in the US Supreme Court.

== Global Justice Center ==
Benshoof was President of the Global Justice Center (GJC), a New York City based international human rights law organization she founded in 2005. The GJC works to help implement and enforce human rights laws that advance gender equality. In 2011, whilst President of the GJC, she suggested that Myanmar's military government should be referred to the International Criminal Court for violations of international law.

== Publications ==
Benshoof published numerous articles in the Harvard Law Review, The Journal of the American Medical Association, The New York University Journal of International Law and Policy, Issues in Science and Technology, Women's Health Issues, and Law Ka Pala, a Journal of The Burma Lawyers' Council.

Her publications include "Global Justice for the Twenty-First Century: International Legal Issues" for the Encyclopedia of Global Studies, "US Ratification of CEDAW: An Opportunity to Revisit and Reframe the Right to Equality Accorded Women under the US Constitution" for the NYU Review of Law and Social Change, and "The Upcoming Elections in Burma: Increasing Risks to Global Security by Constitutionalizing a Military Monopoly on Nuclear Development" with the Burma Lawyers' Council.

== Media ==
Benshoof appeared on the BBC, CBS Evening News, ABC World News Tonight, Good Morning America, Nightline, and PBS NewsHour.

Concerning contraceptive mandates she wrote in the Chicago Tribune that, "there are strong stereotypes about women that are behind this discrimination. Men are meant to have erections and sexual pleasure. Hence, fund Viagra. Women are designed to get pregnant, become mothers, and not be sexual. Hence don't fund 'unnatural' contraception or abortion."

In a 2016 piece in The New York Times, Benshoof argued that the United States should assume the lead in prosecuting ISIS fighters for genocide, writing, "Prosecution of ISIS crimes as genocide is both a legal and a moral obligation. American leadership to ensure that these prosecutions take place will reinforce the global values of diversity that ISIS is seeking to destroy."

== Death ==
Benshoof died at her Manhattan home in New York City on December 18, 2017, aged 70, from uterine serous carcinoma, an endometrial cancer, which had been diagnosed a month earlier, according to her son, David Benshoof Klein. Other survivors include her second husband, Alfred Meyer; another son from her first marriage, Eli Klein; and a sister. Her first marriage to Richard Klein, a law professor, ended in divorce.

== Awards ==
- 1992 MacArthur Fellows Program
- 1993 "Civil Liberties Heroine" Award, Freedom From Religion Foundation
- Edith I. Spivack Award for Outstanding New York Women Lawyers
- Planned Parenthood Federation of America Margaret Sanger Award
- Gloria Steinem Women of Vision Award
- "100 Most Influential Lawyers in America" in the National Law Journal
