= Srinivasa Rao =

Srinivasa Rao or Sreenivasa Rao (Telugu: శ్రీనివాసరావు) is a masculine given name, commonly used in India. It is formed by combining Srinivas and Rao.

- Bhimaneni Srinivasa Rao, Indian film director
- Chittajallu Srinivasa Rao (1924–2004), Indian film actor, writer and director
- Ganta Srinivasa Rao (born 1960), Indian politician
- Inturi Srinivasa Rao or Vasu Inturi, Indian actor and comedian
- Kolachalam Srinivasa Rao (1854–1919), Indian writer
- Kota Srinivasa Rao (born 1943), Indian actor and politician
- Sreenivasa Rao Jammalamadaka (born 1944), American statistician
- Modiyam Srinivasa Rao (born 1967), Indian politician
- Muttamsetti Srinivasa Rao (born 1967), Indian politician
- Nittoor Srinivasa Rau or Nittur Srinivasa Rao (1903 – 2004)
- Singeetam Srinivasa Rao (born 1931), Indian filmmaker
- Srirangam Srinivasa Rao or Sri-Sri (1910–1983), Indian poet and lyricist
- Srinivasa IV Rao Sahib (1904 – 1989), Indian ruler
- Valluri Srinivasa Rao (born 1981), Indian weightlifter
