= Nangli Wazidpur =

- Village
- Location in Uttar Pradesh, India Nangli Wazidpur (India)
- Coordinates: 28.57°N 77.32°E
- Country: India
- State: Uttar Pradesh
- District: Gautam Buddha Nagar District

Population
  - Total: 1,800

Languages
  - Official: Hindi
- Time zone: UTC+5:30 (IST)
- PIN: 201304

Nangli Wazidpur is a village in the western part of the state of Uttar Pradesh. It forms part of the New Okhla Industrial Development Authority's planned industrial city, Noida, falling in Sector-135, noida. Nangli Wazidpur is about 25 kilometers (12 mi) southeast of New Delhi and Nangli Wazidpur is around 900 meters from Yamuna Expressway, formerly known as Taj Expressway, and opposite Sector 93. The village is a part of the Noida Vidhan Sabha (state assembly) constituency and Gautam Buddh Nagar Lok Sabha (parliamentary) constituency.

== Community ==
Nangli Wazidpur is mainly inhabited by the Chauhan Rajput community, which forms the majority in the village. The total population is estimated to be around 10,000, with about 7,000 people belonging to the Chauhan Rajput community.

As per local tradition, the Chauhan Rajputs here trace their ancestry back to the army of Prithviraj Chauhan, the last hindu emperor of Delhi. It is believed that after the Second Battle of Tarain, parts of his army scattered and eventually settled in different regions of northern India, including areas of present-day western Uttar Pradesh.

The village is locally said to have been founded in the 14th century by Chaudhary Kisan Shahi, who is remembered in oral accounts as a chieftain from the Chauhan lineage. Because of this, residents often consider it one of the oldest village in the Noida–Greater Noida belt.

In the wider Noida city, there are several villages where Chauhan Rajputs live. Local estimates suggest that around 22 villages in the area are predominantly Chauhan Rajput, together forming a voter base of roughly 50,000 people in local electoral records.

The surrounding area also has villages linked with other Rajput communities. District-level accounts mention that Bhati Rajputs, originally from the Jaisalmer region of Rajasthan, settled in parts of present-day Gautam Buddha Nagar and ruled over the region for a period over time. Ghodi Bachheda village in Greater Noida is associated with the Bhati Rajputs, and in local tradition Rao Kasal Singh Bhati is regarded as one of the early settlers there founding the present day village Kasna.

== Climate ==
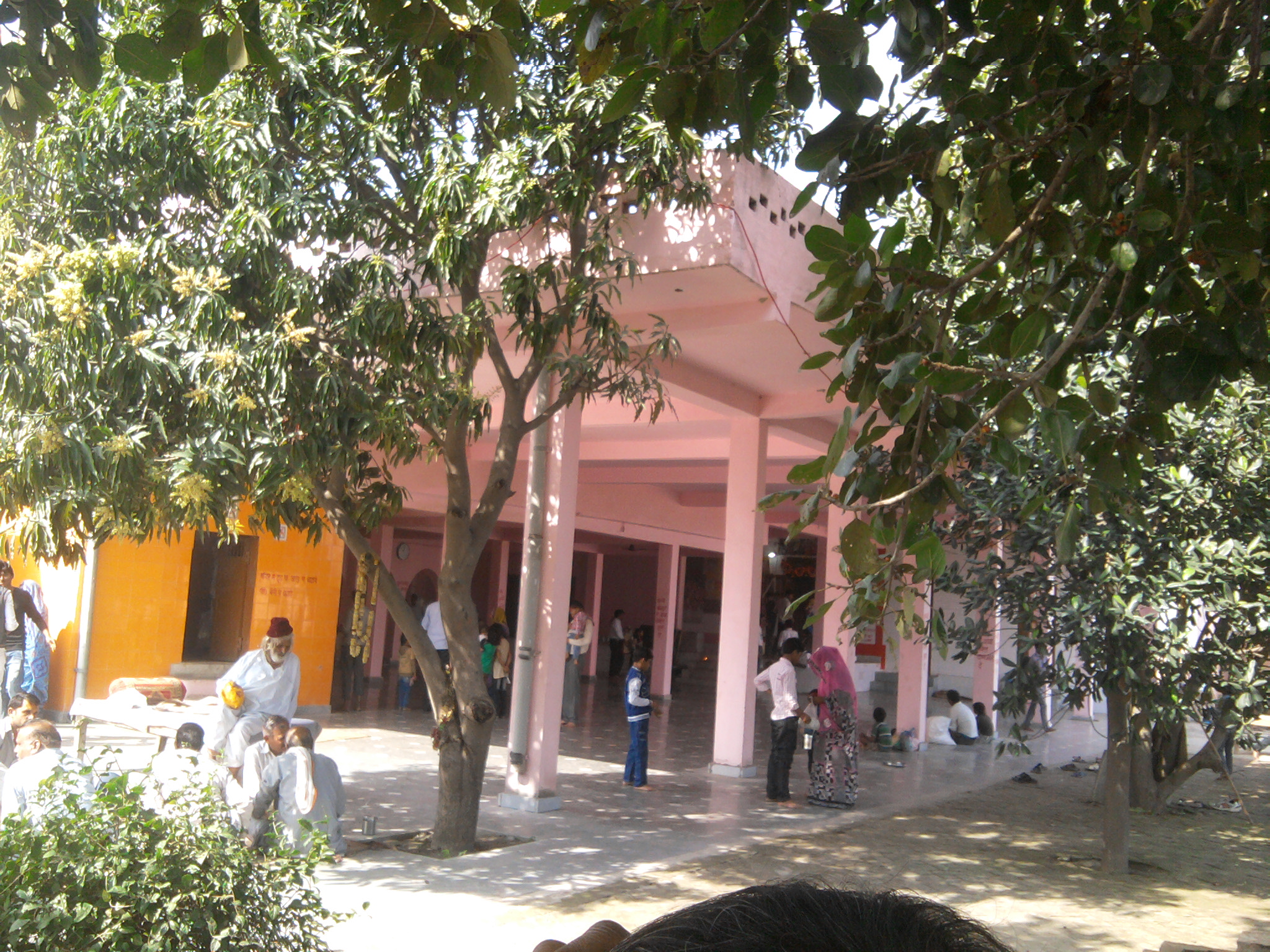
Beri Wale Baba Temple

Nangli Wazidpur falls under the catchment area of the Yamuna river and is located on the old river bed. The soil is rich and loamy. Nangli Wazidpur has a hot and humid climate for most of the year. It becomes the hottest during June, which is followed by the monsoon period somewhere between mid-June and mid-September. In summer (March to June) the weather remains hot and the temperature ranges from a maximum of 48 °C to a minimum of 28 °C. Monsoons in Nangli Wazidpur are unpredictable. Winter in Nangli Wazidpur is chilly peaking at the start of November and continuing till the month of February.

The cold waves from the Himalayan region make the winters in the village chilly. Temperatures fall down to as low as 10 to 4 °C at the peak of winters. In January a dense fog envelopes the village, reducing visibility on the streets.

=== Beri wale Baba Temple ===
The beri wale Baba temple is situated in the village Nagli Nangla . The great yogi Beri wale Baba is said to meditate under Ber tree in 18th century. The Ber tree is still there along with the temple where large numbers of devotees attend darshans of Devi devtas. Every year on Holi and Diwali thousands of devotees came to have darshan at temple.

== Issues ==
=== Farmer's oppression's ===
Nangli Wazidpur farmers have demanding a hike in compensation for their land acquired by the Noida Authority from past many decades. Buoyed by the courts' quashing several farmland acquisitions in Noida Extension, village farmers whose land was acquired eight years ago for development are demanding a share in the upcoming infrastructure. They say they have a right to get free checkups at hospitals and education for their children. Village lands were acquired in 2003 and a less compensation of Rs 329 per M^{2} was given to farmers.

=== Illegal sand mining ===
Illegal sand mining is adding to the plight of the Yamuna river in the banks of whole Yamuna area. It has not only changed the course of the river but also made its riverbed unstable, thus disturbing the biodiversity of the region.
