= Nangal, Zira =

Nangal
- village
- Location in Punjab, India Nangal (India)
- Coordinates: 31.08315018°N 75.05842209°E
- Country: India
- State: Punjab
- District: Firozpur
- Tehsil: Zira
- Elevation: 210 m (690 ft)

Population (2011)
  - Total: 303
- Time zone: UTC+5:30 (IST)
- 2011 census code: 34254

Nangal is a village in the Firozpur district of Punjab, India. It is located in the Zira tehsil.

== Demographics ==
According to the 2011 census of India, Nangal has 55 households. The effective literacy rate (i.e. the literacy rate of population excluding children aged 6 and below) is 76.26%.

Demographics (2011 Census)
	Total	Male	Female
Population	303	149	154
Children aged below 6 years	25	16	9
Scheduled caste	46	22	24
Scheduled tribe	0	0	0
Literates	212	109	103
Workers (all)	89	87	2
Main workers (total)	78	76	2
Main workers: Cultivators	71	70	1
Main workers: Agricultural labourers	0	0	0
Main workers: Household industry workers	0	0	0
Main workers: Other	7	6	1
Marginal workers (total)	11	11	0
Marginal workers: Cultivators	0	0	0
Marginal workers: Agricultural labourers	11	11	0
Marginal workers: Household industry workers	0	0	0
Marginal workers: Others	0	0	0
Non-workers	214	62	152
