= Akil Dhahar =

Akil Dhahar was the leader of the Sanaag region in Somaliland and some portions of the Bari region in Somalia in the late nineteenth century.
