= Akhila =

- Pronunciation: अखिला
- Gender: Female

Origin
- Origin: Indian Sanskrit
- Meaning: "whole", "complete", Shivā शिवा as सति
- Region of origin: India

Other names
- Related names: Akhil

Akhila (in Devanagari: अखिला akhilā) is a Hindu/Sanskrit Indian given name, which means "everything" or "complete".

Akhilā means the consort of god Akhil who is Gokul.

Akhil (अखिल) when sub divided with essence of the base sanskrit here "A" अ means (negative or deprived of) and "khil" खिल means uncultivated or unploughed land that is raw and untouched. It's a characteristic name of Shiv शिव and Akhilā (अखिला) his consort as his power (शक्ति) Shiva शिवा.

Thus the name Akhileshvara means the god of everything is Shiv and his consort is goddess Akhileshvari

Source- https://www.wisdomlib.org/

Notable persons with the name include:

- Akhila Kishore (born 1990), Indian actress
- Akhila Sasidharan (born 1989), Indian actress and dancer
- Akhila Srinivasan (born 1962), Indian businesswoman

== See also ==
- Akhil (disambiguation)
