= Nangal, Phagwara =

Nangal
- Village
- Location in Punjab, India Nangal (India)
- Coordinates: 31.196531°N 75.761859°E
- Country: India
- State: Punjab
- District: Kapurthala

Government
  - Type: Panchayati raj (India)
  - Body: Gram panchayat

Population (2011)
  - Total: 3,082
- Sex ratio 1663/1419♂/♀

Languages
  - Official: Punjabi
  - Other spoken: Hindi
- Time zone: UTC+5:30 (IST)
- PIN: 144401
- Telephone code: 01822
- ISO 3166 code: IN-PB
- Vehicle registration: PB-09
- Website: kapurthala.gov.in

Nangal is a village in Phagwara Tehsil in Kapurthala district of Punjab State, India. It is located 43 kilometres (27 mi) from Kapurthala, 3 kilometres (1.9 mi) from Phagwara. The village is administrated by a Sarpanch who is an elected representative of village as per the constitution of India and Panchayati raj (India).

== Transport ==
Phagwara Junction and Mauli Halt are the nearest railway stations to Nangal. Jalandhar City railway station is 24 kilometres (15 mi) distant. The village is 119 kilometres (74 mi) from Sri Guru Ram Dass Jee International Airport in Amritsar, while Sahnewal Airport in Ludhiana is 37 kilometres (23 mi) away. Phagwara, Jandiala, Jalandhar, Phillaur are the nearby cities.
