= Nangal, Nihal Singh Wala =

Nangal is a small village near Nihal Singh Wala Tehsil in the Moga district of Punjab, India. This small village had a population of nearly 2500 according to the 2011 census.

== Population ==
As of the 2011 census of India, the village's population was 2641.

== Religious sites ==
- Gurdwara Sitalsar Sahib
- Asthaan of Baba Tapa Ram Ji
- Temple Devi Dwalia
- Gurdwara Baba Jiwan Singh
- Mander Mata Naano Mai

== Other attractions ==
- Martyr Park
- Village library

== See also ==
- Bode
- Badhni Kalan
