= Nangli, Rajasthan =

Coordinates: 13°12′N 78°31′E

Nangwas is a village in Alwar district, which is at the Haryana border near Rewari.
