= Deepak Maheshwari =

Former Judge of Rajasthan High Court

Justice Deepak Maheshwari
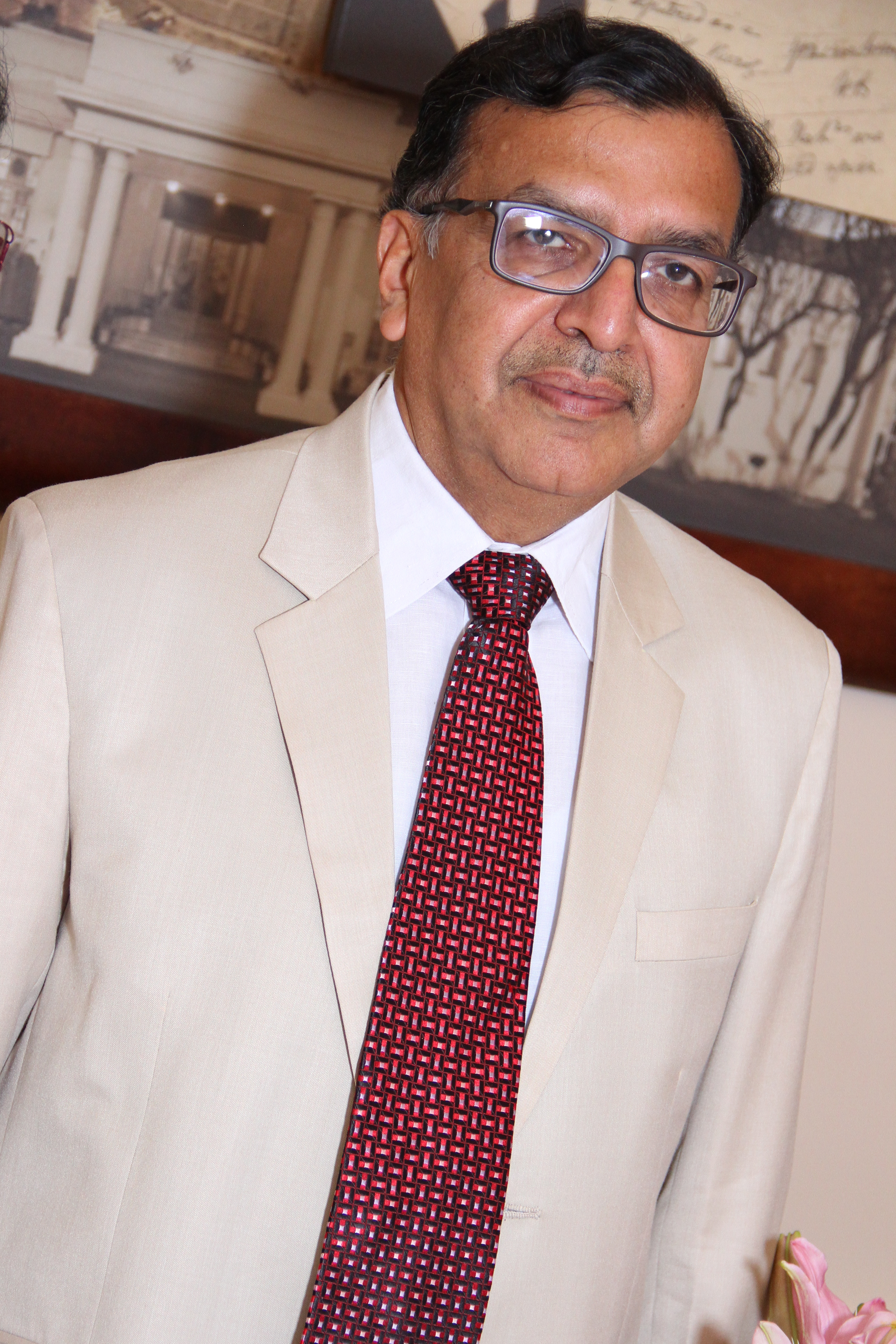

Former Judge of Rajasthan High Court
- In office 11 April 2016 - 27 July 2018
- Appointed by: Pranab Mukherjee, The President Of India

Personal details
- Born: 28 July 1956 (age 70); Ajmer
- Spouse: Renu Maheshwari
- Children: 2
- Education: University of Rajasthan

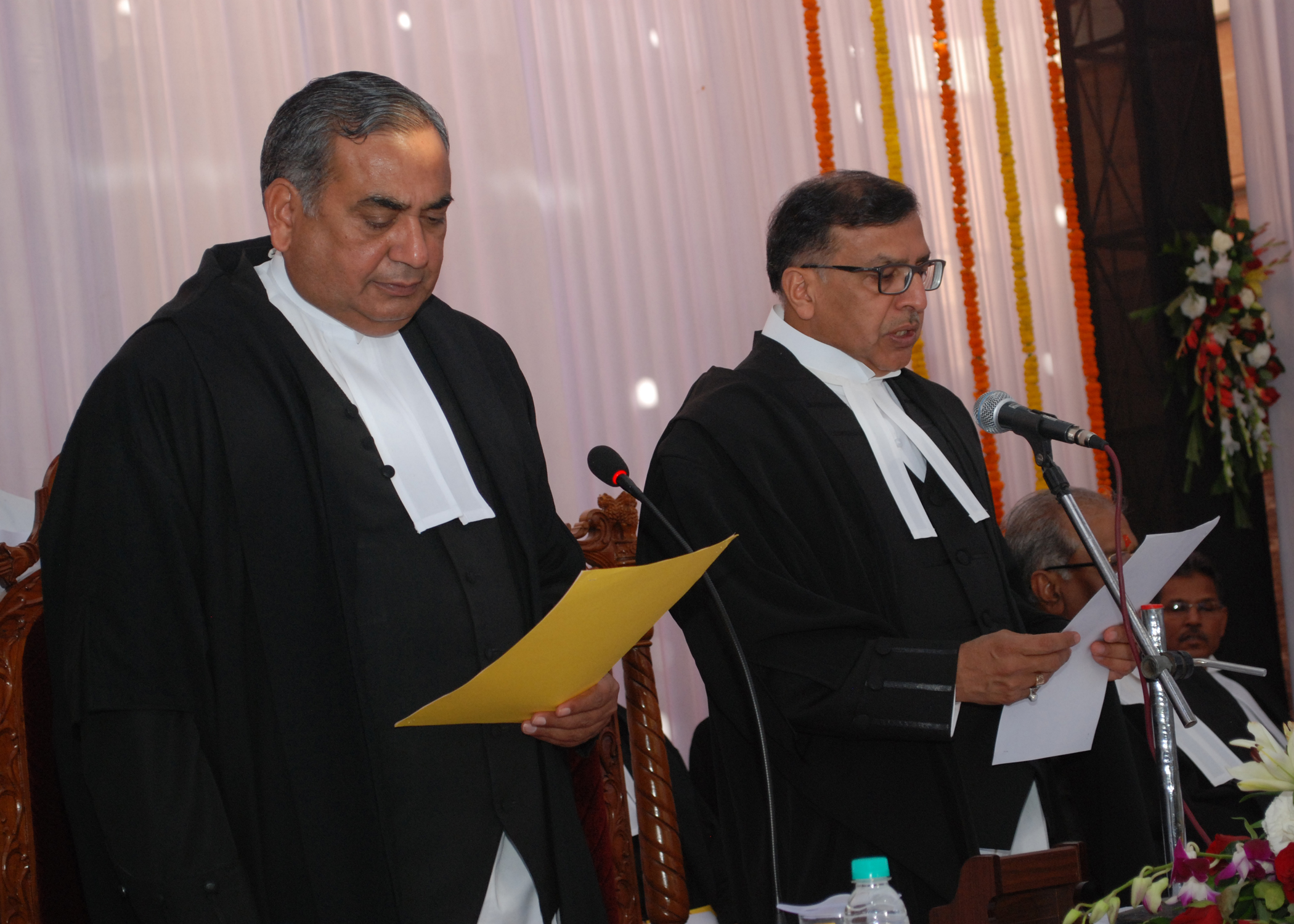
Deepak Maheshwari taking oath

Deepak Maheshwari (born 28 July 1956 ) is a former Indian judge of the Rajasthan High Court. He was sworn in on 11 April 2016 by the then Chief Justice S.K. Mittal of the Rajasthan High Court. He worked at the principal bench of the High Court in Jodhpur as well as its circuit bench in Jaipur. He also served as the chairperson of the solid waste management committee established by the National Green Tribunal (NGT), New Delhi for Rajasthan and now presides over domestic as well as international commercial arbitrations, mainly in Rajasthan.

== Early life and education ==
He was born on 28 July 1956 at Ajmer. His father Shri Kedar Nath Maheshwari is a (Retd.) Deputy Director of Education, Rajasthan and mother Late Smt. Saroj Kumari Maheshwari was (Retd.) Additional Director of Education, Rajasthan. After attending Government College, Ajmer in 1975 where he pursued B.Sc. (Hons.) in Mathematics, he took admission to Law Faculty in the University of Rajasthan, Jaipur and obtained a first class degree in L.L.B in the year 1978.

== Career ==
Justice Maheshwari joined Rajasthan Judicial Service (RJS) in the first attempt in 1980 at the young age of 24. Thereafter, he served at various places and positions in the districts of Jaipur, Dholpur, Jodhpur, Bikaner, Sirohi, Bharatpur, Dausa etc. He was promoted to Rajasthan Higher Judicial Service (RHJS) in the year 1999 and thereafter served at Bhilwara, Udaipur, Sikar, Jodhpur and Jaipur during which he also discharged duties in the Special Courts of SC/ST, Women Atrocities etc. and later, assumed the charge of District & Sessions Judge, Jaipur Metropolitan. He was assigned some prestigious positions like Registrar (Administration), Registrar (Vigilance), Registrar (Examination) and OSD (Finance & Infrastructure) in the Hon'ble High Court of Judicature for Rajasthan and he also served as Principal Secretary (Law & Legal Affairs Dept.) to the Government of Rajasthan along with additional charges.

== 2014 Lawyers' strike ==
In 2014, when Justice Maheshwari was District & Sessions Judge, Jaipur Metropolitan, he came to the rescue of entire lower judiciary in the state by protecting his subordinate Additional District and Sessions Judge Mahendra Singh Chaudhary on 7 July 2014 who felt offended by a group of lawyers attempting to pressurize him to recall a judicial order passed against an advocate Bharat

Bhushan Pareek evicting him from a tenanted premises of an old couple. By taking a bold step, Judge Chaudhary brought it on record and called it contemptuous. The order was supported by Justice Maheshwari despite protest and threats from the Bar. It triggered a complete strike on 9 July 2014 by around one lakh lawyers in 800 courts across the state demanding transfer of both the judges by calling their actions anti-lawyer activities. Some serious allegations of corruption were also leveled against both the judges. Nonetheless, Justice Maheshwari, being the senior most officer of the district judiciary, boldly led from the front against unethical elements of the Bar who brought disrepute to the institution.

On 14 July, the then Rajasthan High Court Judge Bela M. Trivedi took suo moto cognizance of the strike and issued a contempt notice to the group of lawyers for making a mountain out of a molehill to go on strike. That made the lawyers include Bela M. Trivedi's transfer too the main demand to end the strike. Subsequently, Supreme Court Bench of Justices Sudhanshu Jyoti Mukhopadhyaya and S.A. Bobde had to intervene in the matter on 4 August which told Jaipur lawyer Bharat Bhushan Pareek, an appellant in an eviction decree against him for a flat and a basement in a prime Jaipur locality: "First end the strike and then come to us on August 8." A Bench of Justices Dipak Misra and Vikramajit Sen also issued notices to the Bar Council of India, the State Bar Council of Rajasthan, and the Jaipur High Court Bar Association to appear before the Supreme Court on 9 September 2014 to explain the ongoing strike.

Simultaneously, clash erupted between two groups of advocates in Rajasthan when one group decided to call off the ongoing strike and resume work in courts while the other group pressed upon boycotting the work till the time both the judges Chaudhary and Maheshwari in Jaipur were transferred. Finally, the strike was called off by the Advocate General N. M. Lodha on 14 September after 68 days of absence from work. While none of the judges was transferred as demanded, the worst blow of the strike was suffered by the litigants and undertrial prisoners who had to present their cases themselves in courts since the advocates did not appear. Justice Maheshwari's solidarity with the lower judiciary in securing its independence was appreciated in this whole incidence and he was admired for keeping up the rule of law laid down by the Hon'ble Supreme Court of India that strike by advocates is illegal.

== Representations and other positions held ==
- Conference on 'Gender Justice' organized by the British Council in 2000
- Represented Government of Rajasthan in 2015 for the course on "Legislative Drafting" organized by the University College of London in association with the British High Commission in London, United Kingdom
- Member representative for the Government of Rajasthan at the National Seminar on "Narcotic Drugs Challenges and Solutions" organized by National Legal Services Authority and State Legal Services Authority, Himachal Pradesh in 2015
- Was Ex-officio Member, Governing Council, National Law University, Jodhpur

== Personal life ==
Apart from law, he has profound interest in spiritualism and is a passionate nature lover. His father Shri K. N. Maheshwari runs a charitable trust to educate the poor children living in the streets in which his wife is also a trustee. Daughter Purva is married and son Naman is an advocate practicing in the Supreme Court of India.
