= Global Justice Center =

International human rights organization aiming to advance gender equality

- Founded: 2005; 21 years ago
- Type: Non-profit NGO
- Purpose: Human rights activism
- Headquarters: New York City, United States
- Region served: Worldwide
- Product: Non profit human rights advocacy
- Key people: Janet Benshoof (Founder); Elise Keppler (Executive Director)
- Website: globaljusticecenter.net

Global Justice Center (GJC) is an international human rights and humanitarian law organization aiming to advance gender equality by helping to implement and enforce human rights laws. Headquartered in New York City and led by Elise Keppler, GJC is a member of the United Nations NGO Working Group on Women, Peace and Security. GJC works with national and international Non-governmental organizations, the United Nations, the International Criminal Court, and others to promote the progressive, feminist interpretation and application of international law.

== History ==
Global Justice Center was founded in 2005 by American human rights lawyer Janet Benshoof. Benshoof, former director of the American Civil Liberties Union's Reproductive Freedom Project and co-founder of the Center for Reproductive Rights, established Global Justice Center to "fulfil her vision of a new kind of human rights organization where women's equality in power was a foundational principle for human rights."

== Issues ==
Global Justice Center has outlined three of its main goals:

- Abortion access is respected, protected, and fulfilled as a fundamental human right
- Gender shapes the prevention of and response to violence, including conflict and mass atrocities
- Multilateral systems integrate principles of feminism, inclusivity, and nondiscrimination

== Abortion Access ==
Global Justice Center believes that safe abortion is a fundamental part of the sexual and reproductive health and rights framework and must be accessible to all pregnant people.

=== Abortion Access in Conflict ===
GJC has worked to ensure the provision of abortion services for war rape victims. They argue that states have “positive obligations to provide non-discriminatory medical care under the Geneva Conventions,” which, according to their interpretation, “entitles all victims of armed conflict — including those brutalized by rape — to complete and non-discriminatory medical treatment.”

=== Illegal US Abortion Policy ===
Global Justice Center continues to challenge US abortion funding restrictions, including the Helms Amendment and Global Gag Rule as violations of international law. GJC has worked to repeal the United States’ Helms Amendment of 1973 which states that “no foreign assistance funds may be used to pay for the performance of abortion as a method of family planning or to motivate or coerce any person to practice abortions.” GJC also argues against an overly restrictive interpretation of the Helms Amendment that includes all abortions, and along with the Government of Norway has called on the United States to allow for abortions for war rape victims.

== Sexual and Gender-Based Violence ==
Global Justice Center believes that sexual and gender-based violence is, at its core, an expression of "discrimination, patriarchy, and inequality." Therefore, its work to prevent sexual and gender-based violence seeks to address and transform these root causes and the patriarchal legal systems that enable it.

=== Mass Atrocity Crimes ===
GJC works to pressure international groups and institutions to use a gender lens when enforcing the Genocide Convention, arguing that current enforcement fails to adequately account for the differential experiences of women in conflict and the gender-based genocidal tactics often used in contemporary warfare, such as sexual slavery. Its 2018 legal analysis of gender and genocide, "Beyond Killing: Gender, Genocide and Obligations under International Law" examines non-killing acts of genocide and argues that the international community has "failed to grapple with the intrinsic role that gender plays the crime of genocide"

Since its founding, GJC's work on mass atrocity crimes has focused on Myanmar. Before and after the 2017 genocide of the Rohingya, GJC worked with Burmese women's organizations to use international law and international standards to challenge discriminatory domestic policies and practices on sexual and gender-based violence. Following the Rohingya genocide and 2021 military coup, GJC has worked to hold Myanmar's military accountable at the International Criminal Court, International Court of Justice, and other international venues for its crimes, which include the systemic use of sexual and gender-based violence.
