= Nangli Godha =

- Village
- Location in Haryana, India Nangli Godha (India)
- Coordinates: 28°9′32.04″N 76°33′17.28″E
- Country: India
- State: Haryana
- District: Rewari

Population (2011)
  - Total: 996

Languages
  - Official: Hindi
- Time zone: UTC+5:30 (IST)
- PIN: 123401
- Telephone code: 911274
- ISO 3166 code: IN-HR
- Vehicle registration: Hr-36
- Sex ratio: 1.04 ♂/♀
- Website: haryana.gov.in

Nangli Godha is a village in Rewari tehsil of Rewari in the Indian state of Haryana.

The literacy rate is 75.4% which translates to 751 literate citizens. There are 217 homes in the village leading to 4.6 people per house on average.

The village is considered to be well developed by its citizens due to proper road infrastructure, clean water access, and sewage infrastructure. The clean water is provided by a water purifier.

There is a private school named Saraswati School in the village, which teaches advanced and English medium education.

== Location ==
Nangli Godha is situated at a distance of 8 km from Rewari, south-west on the State Highway 15. It is 3 km from Kanuka, which is on the Rewari-Narnaul road. Nearby villages are: Thothwal, Rajiyaki, Goliyaki, Bhandor, Bharawas and Daliyaki.

It is at a distance of about 1.5 km from the New Rewari junction, which is a junction on the fright corridor.

== History ==
The village was founded around 300 years back by two Yadav brothers of Gogar Gotra. The elder brother was Godhaji Yadav after whom, the village was originally named Godhaji ki Nangli. Over time, the name evolved into Nangli Godha. The other brother was Paras Ram. The village was initially housed in two havelis- Badi haveli and chhoti haveli, whose remnants are still present.

== Occupation ==
The main occupations of the people relate to agriculture and governmental/private jobs. Some villagers are employed in government services, and many are employed in private jobs in other states and countries.

== Transport ==
Nangli Godha is connected to nearby villages through the road network with the presence of State Transport Service and Private Bus Services, which link it to Rewari and other nearby villages.

== Demographics ==
As of the 2001 India Census, Nangli Godha had a population of 1080 citizens. The male population was 551, while the female population was 529.

As of the 2011 India Census, Nangli Godha had a population of 1666 in 217 households. Males (864) constitute 51.86% of the population and females (802) constitute 48.13%. Nangli Godha (1666) has an average literacy (1266) rate of 75.99%, over than the national average of 74% by 1.99%: male literacy (730) is 57.66%, and female literacy (536) is 42.33% of total literates. In Nangli Godha, 11.70% of the population is under 6 years of age (195).
