= Akilah Institute =

Women's college in Kigali, Rwanda

Coordinates: 1°57′32.33″S 30°3′35.77″E

Akilah Institute for Women
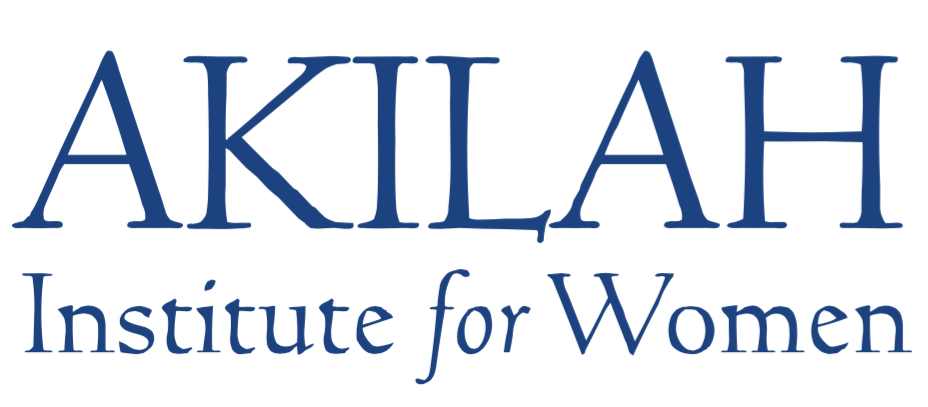
- Industry: Education, Non-Profit
- Founded: 2010
- Founder: Elizabeth Dearborn Hughes
- Headquarters: Kigali, Rwanda
- Website: akilahinstitute.org

The Akilah Institute is a non-profit college for women in Kigali, Rwanda. It is the first college for women in the country. The institute offers three-year diplomas in entrepreneurship, hospitality management, and information systems. Akilah is accredited through Rwanda's Ministry of Education.

== History ==
The Akilah Institute was founded in 2008 by Elizabeth Dearborn Hughes and Dave Hughes. Elizabeth Hughes moved to Rwanda after graduating from Vanderbilt University in 2006. After volunteering with several grassroots initiatives, she co-founded Amani Africa to provide scholarships to street children.

Dave Hughes joined the program as a volunteer. The two strategized on ways to link Rwandan women with long-term employment opportunities. In 2008, they developed the model for Akilah Institute.

The institute officially opened in Kigali, Rwanda, in January 2010 with a diploma in Hospitality Management. Fifty students enrolled in the first class. In 2012, the institute introduced a diploma in Entrepreneurship. Two years later, it launched an Information Systems diploma.

== Function ==
Akilah's mission is ''to offer a market-relevant education that enables young women to achieve economic independence and obtain leadership roles in the workplace and in society.” The curriculum is designed in partnership with local employers and the Rwandan government. Academic majors are selected according to regional market needs.

The Akilah Institute currently has 1,100 students and 990 graduates. The institute has a 93% retention rate, and 88% of graduates find jobs within six months of graduation.

== Burundi Campus ==
In January 2014, Akilah expanded to Burundi and opened the first women's college in the country. In April 2015, the campus was closed due to political instability in the country. Forty-four Burundian students were transferred to Akilah's Kigali campus.

== Funding ==
Akilah is funded primarily through a combination of contributions and grants. Other funding sources include student tuition, in-kind donations, and special events.

== Marriott partnership ==
In 2012, Akilah partnered with Marriott International to introduce a hospitality training program for graduates at Marriott hotels in Dubai and Doha. Since the program's start, dozens of Akilah alumnae have relocated to the Middle East to participate in the program. Marriott hired 23 Akilah graduates to staff its Kigali Marriott Hotel, which opened in 2016.

== Debate team ==
In 2015, Akilah formed Rwanda's first all-female college debate team. The team won a countrywide competition the same year. In October 2015, Akilah hosted the first National Inter-University Female Debate Championship.

== MindSky ==
In January 2015, Akilah founder Elizabeth Dearborn Hughes launched MindSky (formerly AkilahNet) with the co-founder Anastasia Uglova as part of the Akilah Group, a collection of social enterprises with a focus on education, technology, and employment. MindSky is an online talent platform that matches employers with job seekers in East Africa.
