= Akhil Mehta =

- Born: September 19, 1987; New Delhi, India
- Died: March 28, 2015 (aged 27); Ghaziabad, Uttar Pradesh, India
- Cause of death: Suicide
- Other names: Tillu, Notepad Guy, Tyler Durden, ACH Guy
- Education: B.E. (Hons) Electronics & Instrumentation, M.Sc. (Hons) Economics
- Alma mater: Birla Institute of Technology and Science, Pilani – Goa Campus
- Occupations: Comedian, entrepreneur
- Notable work: Tapa tap Tapa tap
- Height: 5 ft 5 in (165 cm)
- Movement: Aap Chutiye Hain
- Awards: Youngest Microsoft Certified Trainer - The Statesman Newspaper, 2000
- Website: twitter.com/AapChutiyeHain

Akhil Mehta (September 19, 1987 – March 28, 2015) was an Indian entrepreneur and comedian. He was known for his Twitter and Facebook satire communities with followers over 270,000. He was the president of Student Union in Birla Institute of Technology and Science, Pilani – Goa Campus. He was an influential social media personality and was known for his outspokenness. He wrote against corruption, religion, hypocrisy or any other wrongdoings he saw in the society in a humorous manner and millions of people liked it.

== Early life ==
Akhil was born in Delhi on September 19, 1987. He studied his kindergarten at Air Force School, Thane and thereafter completed his schooling from Arvind Gupta DAV Centenary Public School, New Delhi. He became Microsoft Certified System Engineer at a record age of 13 in year 2000, was accredited Microsoft Certified System and Internet Engineer and a Microsoft Certified Trainer at a World Record age of a little over 15 years. He won many titles for singing and quizzes during his school days. He was an avid reader, music lover and writer.

== Career ==
After completing studies at BITS Pilani Goa Campus, Akhil Mehta worked for Breakthrough Management Group India at Mumbai for about one and a half years. He was accredited Black Belt in Six Sigma practices. Thereafter Akhil founded two start up firms at Mumbai - LearningPractice and Pointtalent, where he experimented with many novel business ideas.

=== Comedian ===
He created the viral satire handle @AapChutiyeHain on Twitter in May 2011. Apart from his social media comedy he also used to perform local stand-up acts. Mehta's Twitter handle described him as a proud Indian achieving ‘world peace through insult comedy'. The Finding Akhil Mehta revealed in a post that they fear he might have been kidnapped. Mehta would regularly receive threats from "several political and religious groups for criticising them" through his tweets as he was passionately against corruption, hypocrisy and disclosed any injustices done in society as he viewed it.

== Death ==
Akhil went missing on March 27, 2015, after a 15-day search, Police found that Akhil allegedly committed suicide on March 28, 2015, by jumping off a high-rise water tank in Tronica City Ghaziabad, Uttar Pradesh, at the age of 27. The reason given by cops and family was depression but some of the people suspect kidnapping and conspiracy behind that case, because of some political and religious criticism on his page, he was getting threats from many big political and religious followers. Police and other investigating agencies are currently looking into that matter.
