= Akhil Datta-Gupta =

American petroleum engineer

- Born: January 21, 1960 (age 66)
- Title: Regents Professor of Petroleum Engineering at Texas A&M University
- Website: pe.tamu.edu/datta-gupta

Akhil Datta-Gupta (born January 21, 1960) is Regents Professor and holder of L. F. Peterson ‘36 Endowed Chair in Petroleum Engineering at Texas A&M University in College Station, Texas, U.S. Dr. Datta-Gupta is well known for his contributions to the theory and practice of Streamline Simulation in petroleum reservoir characterization, management and calibration of high resolution geologic models. 3-D streamline simulation is considered to be one of the major developments in petroleum reservoir simulation and performance forecasting. Dr. Datta-Gupta is a co-author of the Society of Petroleum Engineers (SPE) textbook Streamline Simulation: Theory and Practice.

Among his honors are the 2009 John Franklin Carll Award from the Society of Petroleum Engineers (SPE) for distinguished contribution in the application of engineering principles to petroleum development and recovery; the 2003 SPE Lester C. Uren Award for significant technical contributions in petroleum reservoir characterization and streamline-based flow simulation; and two SPE Cedric K. Ferguson Certificates for the best peer-approved paper in 2000 and 2006. He has been named an SPE distinguished member, distinguished lecturer, distinguished author and outstanding technical editor.

In addition to his SPE awards, he is a recipient of the AIME Rossitter W. Raymond award and served as a member of the Polar Research Board of the National Academy of Sciences (2001-2004). In 2012, Dr. Datta-Gupta was elected to the U.S. National Academy of Engineering, “for developing the theory and practice of streamline simulation for fluid flow in heterogeneous reservoirs.” Election to the National Academy of Engineering is among the highest professional distinctions accorded to an engineer.

Datta-Gupta earned his master's degree and Ph.D. from the University of Texas at Austin and his B.S. from the Indian School of Mines, Dhanbad (India), all in Petroleum Engineering.
