= Sapna Maheshwari =

American journalist

- Born: Mystic, Connecticut
- Education: University of North Carolina
- Occupation: Journalist
- Website: whatsupna.com

Sapna Maheshwari is an American journalist. Currently, she is a business reporter for The New York Times.

== Life and career ==
Maheshwari, an Indian American, was born in Mystic, Connecticut. She graduated from the University of North Carolina.

She covered e-commerce and retail for BuzzFeed from 2013 to 2016, prior to which she had worked for Bloomberg Businessweek. In 2014, Maheshwari was named by Time magazine as one of the "140 Best Twitter Feeds."

In 2015, Maheshwari won a Front Page Award for her article "Making Victoria's Secret Pay For Keeping Staff On Call". That same year she won "Investigative, Division 2" award from the Society of American Business Editors and Writers for her article "The Dark, Scammy History of JustFab and Fabletics".

In 2016, she joined The New York Times as a business reporter.

Her coverage has focused on the retail industry, corporate advertising, the media industry, and digital platforms like TikTok.

== Filmography ==
In 2022, Maheshwari appeared as herself in the Netflix original documentary film White Hot: The Rise & Fall of Abercrombie & Fitch, directed by Alison Klayman. Drawing from her retail and corporate apparel reporting, she provided commentary on the company's historical marketing tactics under former CEO Mike Jeffries, explaining how the brand merged corporate heritage with sexualized imagery to cultivate a system of exclusivity.

== See also ==
- Business journalism
- Indians in the New York City metropolitan region
- New Yorkers in journalism
