= Nangal, Jalandhar =

Nangal
- Village
- Country: India
- State: Punjab
- District: Jalandhar
- Tehsil: Phillaur

Government
  - Type: Panchayat raj
  - Body: Gram panchayat

Area
  - Total: 362 ha (890 acres)

Population (2011)
  - Total: 4,220; 2,211/2,009 ♂/♀
  - Scheduled Castes: 2,798; 1,488/1,310 ♂/♀
  - Total Households: 881

Languages
  - Official: Punjabi
- Time zone: UTC+5:30 (IST)
- Telephone: 01826
- ISO 3166 code: IN-PB
- Vehicle registration: PB-37
- Website: jalandhar.gov.in

Nangal is a village in Phillaur in the Jalandhar district of Punjab State, India. It is located 1 kilometre (0.62 mi) from subdistrict headquarters and 45 kilometres (28 mi) from district headquarters. The village is administered by a Sarpanch who is an elected representative of the village.

== Demography ==
As of 2011, the village has a total number of 881 houses and a population of 4220 of which 2211 are males while 2009 are females. According to the report published by Census India in 2011, out of the total population of the village 2798 people are from Schedule Caste and the village does not have any Schedule Tribe population so far.

== See also ==
- List of villages in India
