= Nihal Singh Wala =

Town in Moga district, Punjab

Coordinates: 30.5919°N 75.2804°E

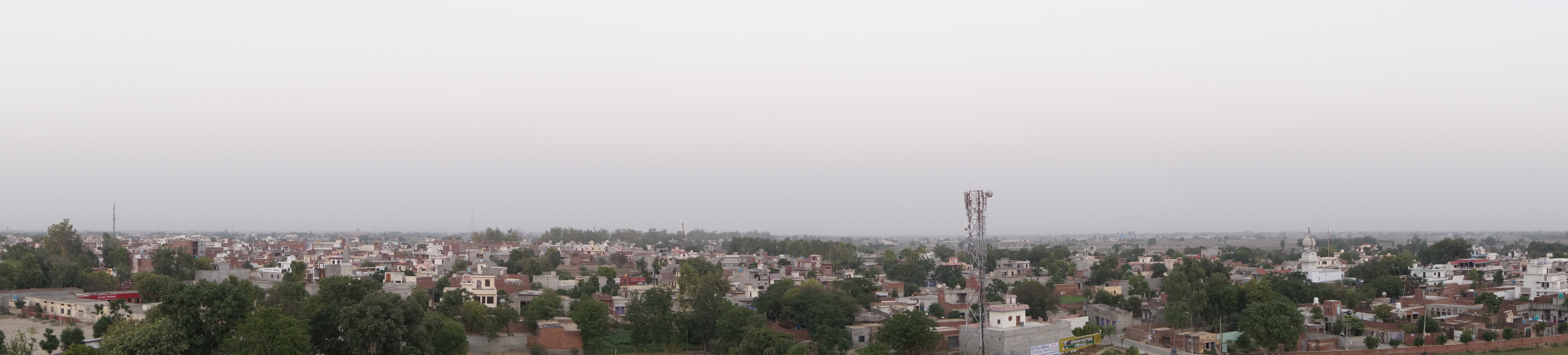
Panorama of Nihal Singh Wala, Moga district

Nihal Singh Wala is a town which falls in Moga district, Punjab, India. It is also a major tehsil of Moga district. The town is situated at Guru Gobind Singh Marg. The nearest cities are Moga, Barnala, Bathinda, Faridkot and Ludhiana. There are about 34 villages under Nihal Singh Wala tehsil. It was founded by 2 Dhaliwal brothers, Nihal Singh who the town is named after and Gulab Singh.

Nihal Singh Wala is the thirteenth town in Punjab to have more than 150 rice mills, behind Khanna and Baghapurana.

The town has a population of about 13000 and has municipal committee.

== History ==
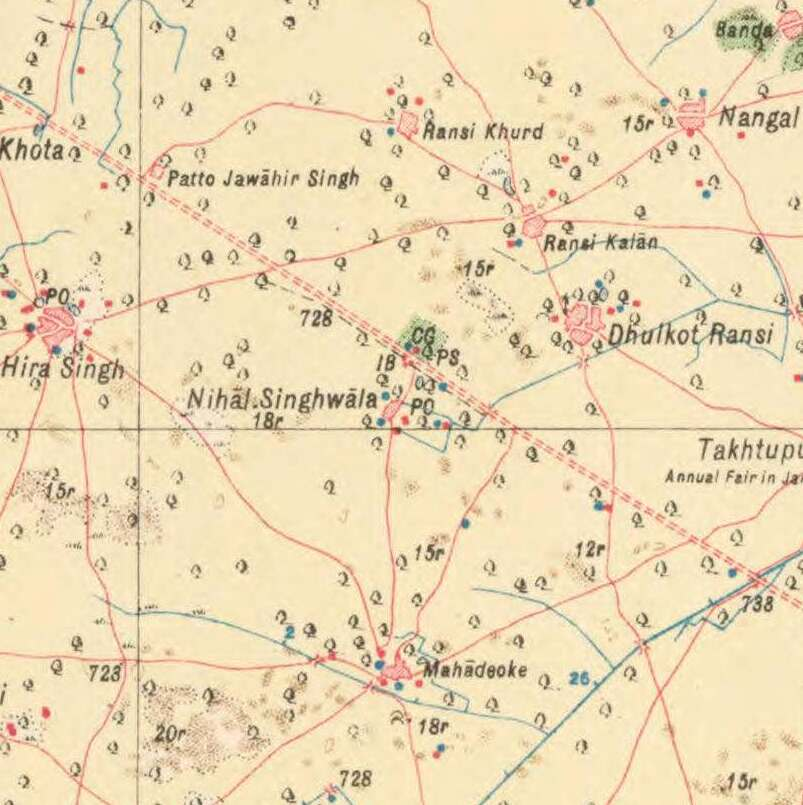
Nihal Singh Wala in Moga tehsil, Survey of India geographical block-map for 44 N NW Ferozepore (1921)

The village was founded by Dhaliwal Jats, specifically the 2 brothers Nihal Singh and Gulab Singh.

== Education ==
The town has five prominent schools.

1. Kamla Nehru Sen. Sec. School
2. Royal Convent School,
3. Green Valley Convent School,
4. Govt High and Primary School
5. M.G. Convent School, Himmatpura

IMT College Manuke, Govt. College Patto Hira Singh.

== Politics ==
Many politicians are also from this town like Darshan Singh Khota (Former Minister), Maheshinder Singh MLA( Baghapurana) resides at Nihal Singh Wala, Bibi Rajwinder Kaur Bhagike MLA. Tota Singh (Cabinet Minister) in SAD government also belongs to village Didar Singh Wala near the town.

== Gallery ==
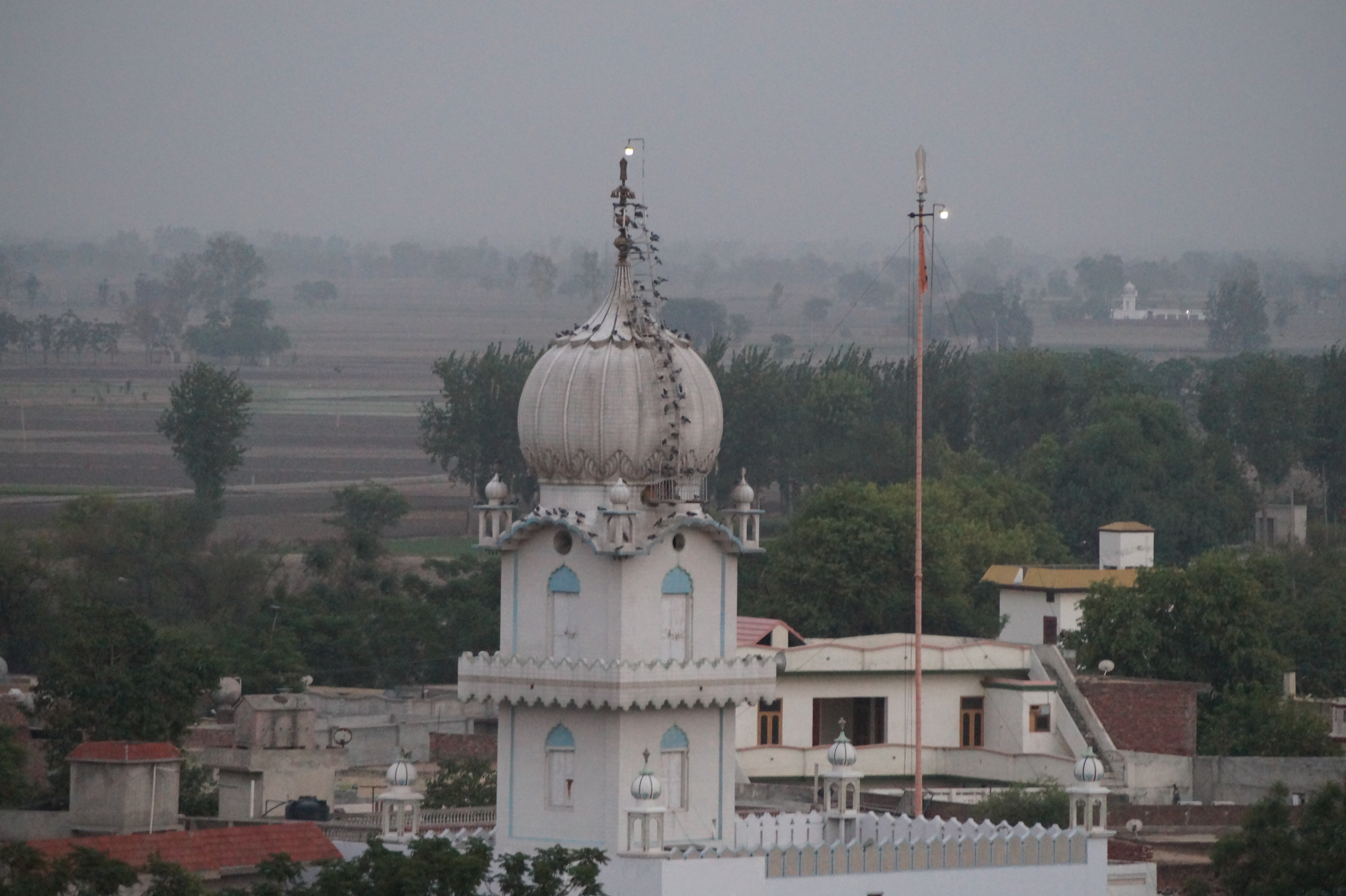
Gurdwara at Nihal Singh Wala, Moga district, Punjab, India

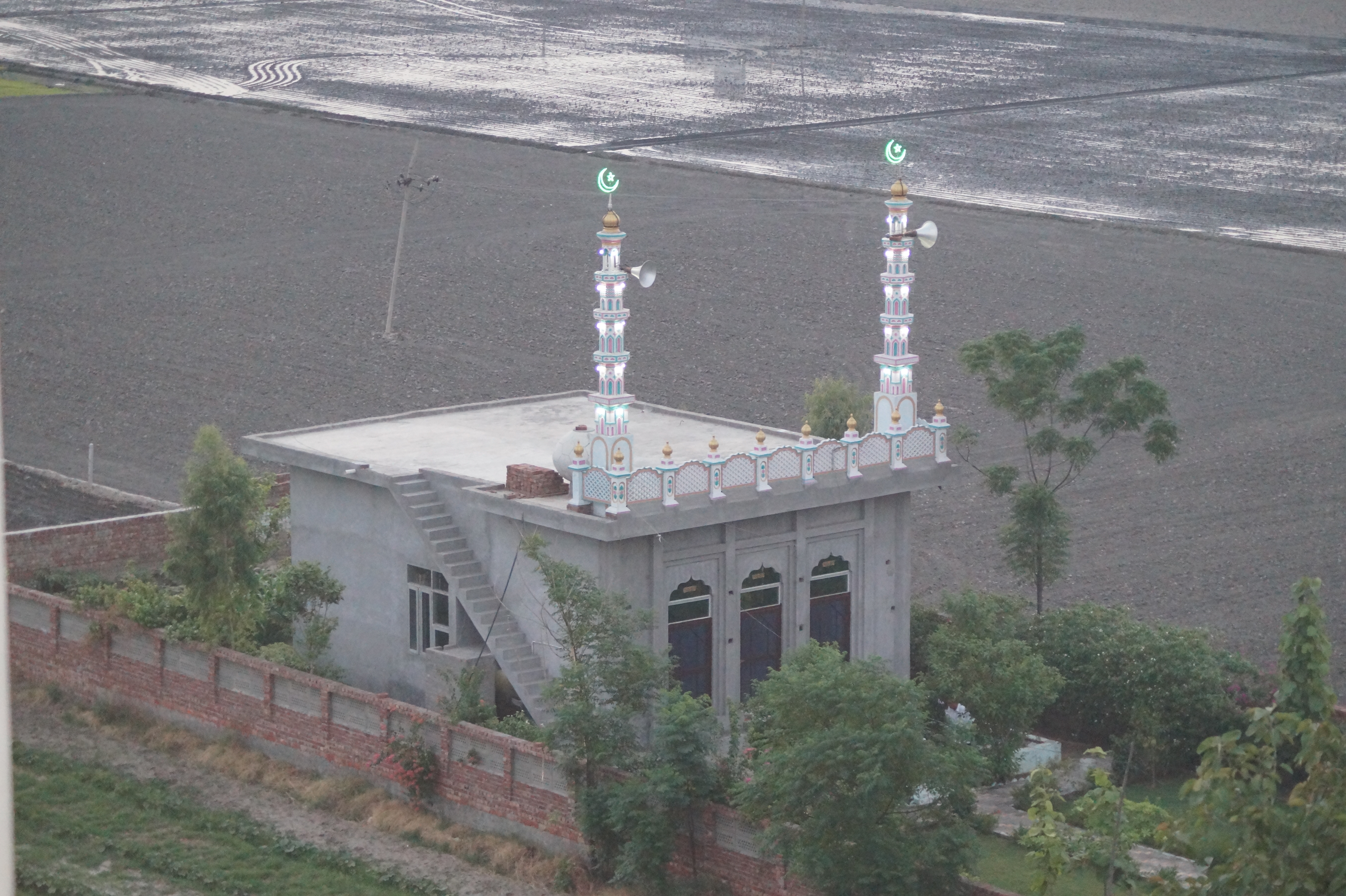
Abu Bakr Mosque, Nihal Singh Wala, Moga district

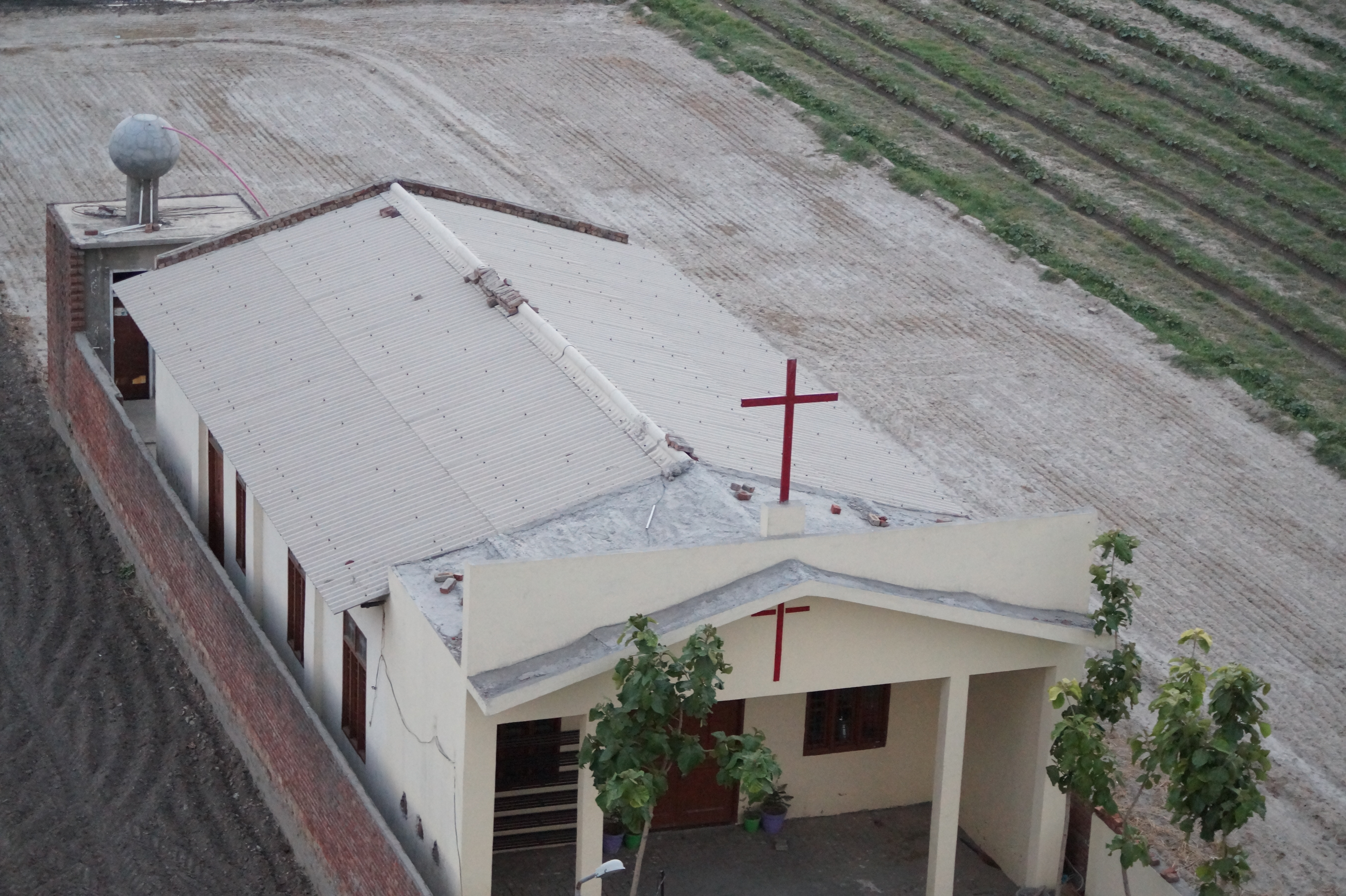
Church, Nihal Singh Wala, Moga district

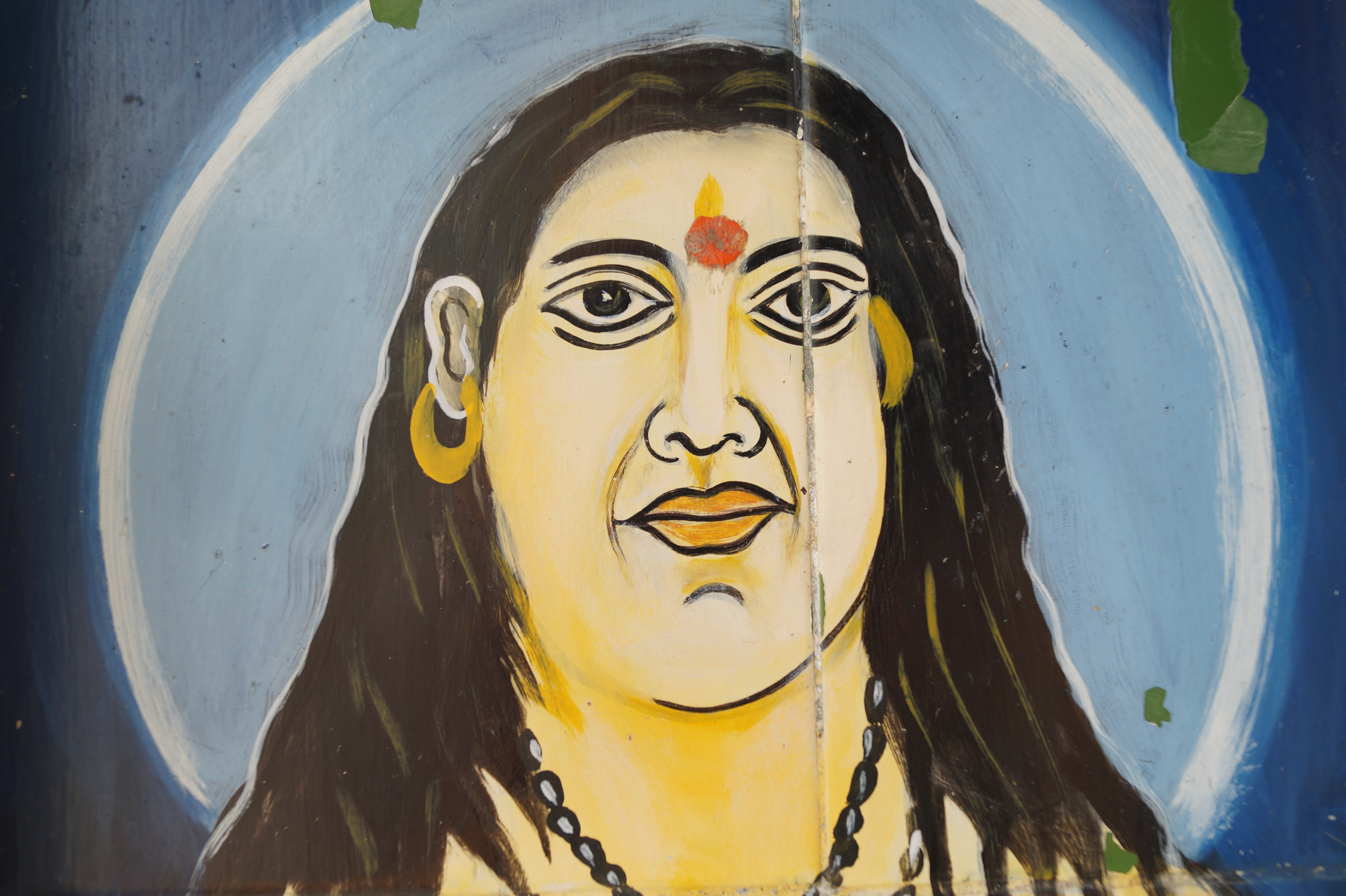
Painting of Baba Khetarpal ji at Nihal Singh Wala

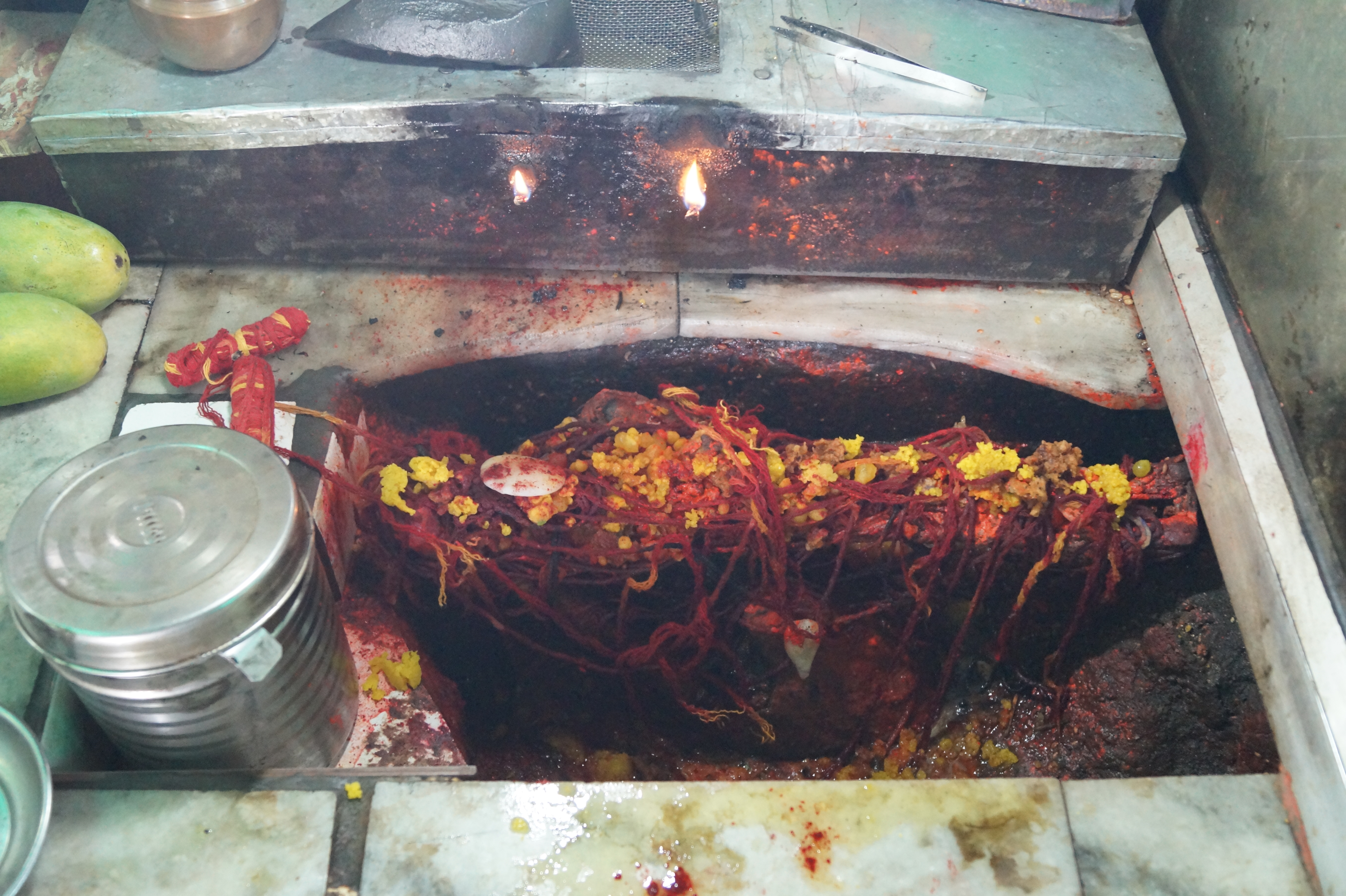
Samaadh of Baba Khetarpal ji at Nihal Singh Wala

== See also ==
- Nangal, Nihal Singh Wala
