= Akhila Srinivasan =

Indian businesswoman

- Education: PhD(Economics)
- Alma mater: University of Madras
- Known for: Managing Director of Shriram Life Insurance Company

Akhila Srinivasan is the Managing Director of the Shriram Group Shriram Life Insurance Company. She is also the founder of the Shriram Foundation, a philanthropic organization with a focus on education, micro-credit, and anti-poverty initiatives, and the founder and Managing Trustee of GiveLife, a related NGO focused on humanitarian projects.

== Early life and education ==
Srinivasan graduated from RSK Higher Secondary School in Tiruchirappalli, and completed her undergraduate and post-graduate education at Seethalakshmi Ramaswami College. Her career plan at first was to join the Indian Administrative Service, and then after marrying and having her first child, she changed her career goal to completing her PhD and becoming a teacher. While she was working on her MPhil in Economics at University of Madras, she applied to become an executive trainee at the Shriram Group, completed the entrance exams and was selected for the program. She holds an MPhil in economics and a PhD in Economics with a focus on micro-credit for women entrepreneurs.

== Career ==
Srinivasan joined Shriram Investments in 1986 as an executive trainee. Her first role in the company included public relations and marketing, and she became the marketing manager after a year as a trainee. She was promoted to general manager of Marketing in 1993 and then President of Shriram Investment Ltd. in 1994. She became the company's managing director in 2000. She became the managing director of Shriram Life Insurance in 2005. From September 2005 to November 2006, she was on the Board of Shriram Transport Finance Co.

In addition to the corporate roles, she served as the Honorary Consul for the Netherlands between 2005 and 2012.

== Social welfare ==
Shriram Foundation, a social welfare arm of the Shriram Group, was founded under her leadership in 1993. The work of the foundation includes a free Montesorri school and a community college. The foundation also focuses on micro-credit finance for rural women, care for orphans and destitute people, and establishing multiple schools and scholarship programs.

She is also the founder and Managing Trustee of GiveLife, established within the Shriram Foundation as an NGO working to provide education to the financially underprivileged children in Tamil Nadu and Andhra Pradesh.

She has served as the president of the Art of Living Foundation, a humanitarian organization, for seven years. She also served as the honorary President of the Shri Shri Ravishankar University in Orissa, to assist with establishing the university.

== Personal life ==
Srinivasan is married to H. Srinivasan, a chartered accountant, and they have two children. She is a trained classical singer.

== Awards and recognition ==
- 1999, Social Responsiveness Award, Federation of Indian Chambers of Commerce & Industry
- 2000-01, Outstanding Woman Professional Award, Federation of Indian Chambers of Commerce & Industry
- 2007 and 2010, 30 Most Powerful Women, Business Today
- 2015, Asia's 50 'Power Businesswomen', Forbes, including for her role in making Shriram Life Insurance "one of top five players in its industry in India in terms of profitability".
