= Nangla-Maheshwari =

- village
- Location in Uttar Pradesh, India Nangla-Maheshwari (India)
- Coordinates: 29.54°N 78.16°E
- Country: India
- State: Uttar Pradesh
- District: Bijnor
- Elevation: 223 m (732 ft)

Population (population_total = area_magnitude= sq. km)
  - Total: 4,000

Languages
  - Official: Hindi
- Time zone: UTC+5:30 (IST)
- PIN: 246721
- Telephone code: 01342
- Vehicle registration: UP-20

Nangla-Maheshwari is a village and a gram panchayat in the Bijnor district of Uttar Pradesh.
