= Akhil Maheshwari =

Indian neonatologist

- Born: India
- Education: Institute of Medical Sciences, Banaras Hindu University; Postgraduate Institute of Medical Education and Research; University of Florida; University of South Florida
- Scientific career
- Fields: Neonatology
- Institutions: University of Alabama at Birmingham; University of Illinois at Chicago; University of South Florida; Johns Hopkins University

Akhil Maheshwari is an Indian neonatologist.

== Academic career ==
In 2004, Maheshwari joined the University of Alabama at Birmingham, Alabama as an assistant professor. He studied innate immunity and the pathogenesis of gut mucosal and systemic inflammation in newborn infants, with a particular focus on a disease called necrotizing enterocolitis (NEC). In this disease, the intestines of a premature or critically ill infant become inflamed and lose viability. His research was supported by the American Gastroenterological Association and the National Institutes of Health.

In 2010, he moved to the University of Illinois College of Medicine at Chicago, Illinois as the Head of Neonatology.

In 2014, he was recruited to the University of South Florida as the Pamela and Leslie Muma Professor, Head of Neonatology, and Assistant Dean for Medical Education. He administered the academic and the clinical programs at the neonatal intensive care unit at Tampa General Hospital. In his laboratory, he investigated the role of intestinal macrophages and platelets in intestinal inflammation.

In 2018, he relocated to the Johns Hopkins University School of Medicine, Baltimore, Maryland as the Josephine S. Sutland Professor of Newborn Medicine, Head of Neonatology, and vice-chairman of the Department of Pediatrics.

== See also ==
- Newborn infants
- Child mortality
