= Suneet Maheshwari =

Suneet Kumar Maheshwari is an infrastructure business evangelisand is the founder and managing partner of Udvik Infrastructure Advisors LLP, a new boutique infrastructure financial services firm set up comprising a group of senior infrastructure and financing evangelists along with another ~25 mid-senior professionals. Till recently he was the group executive vice-president (Grp EVP) of L&T Financial Services. He was also on the board of L&T Infrastructure Finance Company Limited, L&T Infra Debt Fund, L&T FinCorp, L&T Infra PE. He was the managing director and chief executive of L&T Infrastructure Finance Company Ltd since its inception in 2006 till March 2014, which is now a Rs 25,000 crores (US$3.8 billion) asset base company. He has over 34 years of experience in infrastructure finance, investment banking, corporate finance and private equity at management board level.

Before joining L&T, Maheshwari served as executive director and a member of the board of SREI Infrastructure Finance Ltd., a leading Kolkata based infrastructure finance company, where he was responsible for the project finance, investment banking and private equity businesses. Prior to that, as partner, MD & CEO of the Infra Group of Feedback Ventures Ltd., in 2000, Maheshwari was instrumental in creating one of India's pioneering SME infrastructure funds.

Maheshwari also spent over 16 years with ICICI, a leading financial institution in India, in its investment banking and infrastructure advisory group. During his tenure at ICICI, he was actively involved in various Indian infrastructure sector reform policy initiatives. Maheshwari's participation in policy initiatives reaches back to 1991 when India's economic liberalisation began. He has participated in such initiatives at both the central and state levels and covered various infrastructure sectors including telecom, power, roads and petroleum. While at ICICI, Maheshwari was instrumental in the creation of India's pioneering municipal finance initiative with support from the World Bank and the Tamil Nadu Urban Infrastructure Fund. Maheshwari is an active member of various state and central chambers of commerce focusing on infrastructure sector policies and PPP matters.

Maheshwari holds a bachelor's degree in chemistry and physics from the University of Bombay and an MBA from the University of Pune.

== Life and education ==
Suneet was born on 21 April 1958 in Hapur, Uttar Pradesh, India. Suneet is married and they have two children – a son & a daughter. During his time off work, he enjoys reading and takes special interest in Indian Independence History between the years 1857 to 1962. Besides this he also enjoys Hindustani Classical and old Hindi Songs.

Educational Background

Suneet graduated with a B.Sc. (Hons) in Chemistry and Physics from Ramnarain Ruia College in 1979. He completed his Master's in Business Administration from the Symbiosis Institute of Business Management in 1980. He attended a training programme on Strategy and Operations Management for Manufacturing and Marketing Companies and a training programme on Restructuring Strategy for FIs and Banks at the Harvard Business School in 1994 and 1997, respectively.

== Career ==
During the early stages of his career, Suneet shunned job offers from reputed companies and took up the challenge of Market Planning and Distribution for a family managed company, Carona Sahu Pvt. Ltd. in 1981. He started there as a management trainee but through his ability and hard work, he quickly climbed up the corporate ladder. During his tenure as Manager-Market Planning and Distribution in Delhi, Suneet increased the turnover and energised dealer network by 100%. He then moved to Bombay to look after the All India Market Planning and Distribution where he helped develop new products, created new markets in East India and Hilly regions in India, competently repositioned some of the leading products of Carona Sahu Pvt. Ltd. and reduced slow moving inventory across India.

After a successful Marketing career of 3.5 years at Carona Sahu Pvt. Ltd., in 1984, Suneet switched careers to join the Merchant Banking Division of ICICI where over a period of next 6 years, he managed over 50 transactions such as BPL, BSES Dahanu power project, Indian Ryon, Hindustan Motors, etc. He also specialised in Investment Banking at ICICI where he innovated 2 concepts, namely, Equity placement which focused on client relationship and Sectoral focus on the Electrical and IT sectors.

In 1990 he moved to the Advisory Services Division of ICICI as the SBU head and Deputy general manager. During his time at ICICI, Suneet was part of various Indian infrastructure sector reform policy making & PPP initiatives at the federal & state level since 1991– viz., the July'91 liberalisation policy, the NHAI inception plan, Power sector reforms in Andhra Pradesh, Uttar Pradesh, Madhya Pradesh & IPP programmes is several states; initiating the Telecom & Petroleum sector reform plan including the pathway to facilitate private sector participation.

Suneet moved to Feedback Ventures, a boutique infrastructure advisory company, in 2000, where he worked as a Partner and managing director (CEO) of their Core Infrastructure Advisory business (Energy, Transport & Urban Infra). He was, inter alia, given charge of making operational India's first private sector urban infrastructure equity fund and then played the role of Investment Advisor to that Fund. He was also responsible for scaling up their infrastructure advisory practice focused at Energy & Power, Transportation & Urban Infrastructure. Since his entry into Feedback group, their Core Infrastructure operations grew ~3 times in 3 yrs.

Suneet joined SREI Infrastructure Finance Ltd. in 2004, a leading Kolkata based infrastructure finance company as a member of the board assisting them in change management and overseeing their Infrastructure Project & Structured Finance, Investment Banking, Project Development & Advisory services, Venture Capital & Private Equity business. He was also involved in institutional strengthening initiatives as well as in managing relationships with banks & financial system in Mumbai. He was also the MD & CEO of their capital market operations – SREI Capital Markets Ltd. between the years 2004 and 2006.

In 2006, Suneet help found L&T Infrastructure Finance Co. Ltd. (L&T Infra Finance). L&T Infra Finance is an infrastructure finance company floated by a premier Indian engineering & infra company – Larsen and Toubro Ltd. Suneet was and continues to be the Chief Executive of the organisation since inception. His mandate was to build a new financing institution specialising in infra financing. He has been responsible for company formation, getting regulatory approvals, formation of a board with eminent professionals, and personally involved in creating a team with a pan-India presence. With an initial equity capital of Rs. 5 billion he led this company's operations to an asset base of Rs. 155 bn (30 Sep 2013). Suneet is also in the process of creating a private equity asset management platform that will provide asset management services to channelise a pool of funds from domestic and international investors into the development of Indian infrastructure. Apart from this, Suneet is also known for his ability to identify talent, train and lead multi-disciplinary teams and evolve a strategy and guide implementation.

== Affiliations ==
Suneet has been associated with various industry associations and company boards. With the CII, he has been chairman, CII Core Group on Infrastructure Financing & Member of CII National Council on Infrastructure for the years 2010–11, 2011–12 & 2012–13. He has also been the Chairman of the Task Force of Mumbai Regional Development, CII. He has been Chairman of the Infrastructure Committee at the Indian Merchants' Chamber for 2010–11 and 2011–2012. He was also independent director and Audit Committee Chairman of Perfect Circle India Ltd.
