= 1997 Men's Intercontinental Cup (field hockey) =

Field hockey tournament

The 1997 Men's Intercontinental Cup was a qualifier for the 1998 Men's Hockey World Cup. It was held in Kuala Lumpur, Malaysia, from Tuesday March 4 to Saturday March 15, 1997. Twelve nations took part, and they were divided into two groups of six in the preliminary round. The top six teams joined the other six that have already qualified: Australia, England, Germany, India, Netherlands, and Pakistan.

== Squads ==
Argentina
  - ( 1.) Pablo Moreira (gk)
  - ( 2.) Jorge Querejeta
  - ( 3.) Edgardo Pailos
  - ( 4.) Maximiliano Caldas
  - ( 5.) Diego Chiodo
  - ( 6.) Fernando Moresi
  - ( 7.) Rodolfo Pérez
  - ( 8.) Carlos Retegui
  - ( 9.) Carlos Geneyro
  - (10.) Santiago Capurro
  - (11.) Jorge Lombi
  - (12.) Germán Orozco
  - (13.) Rodolfo Schmitt (gk)
  - (14.) Martin Costanzo
  - (15.) Andrés Castelli
  - (16.) Eduardo Peralta
  - Head coach

Alejandro Verga

Belarus
  - ( 1.) Edouard Gordich
  - ( 2.) Dmitry Youkovskyi
  - ( 3.) Sergey Drozdov
  - ( 4.) Leonid Onyouk
  - ( 5.) Igor Voytiouk
  - ( 6.) Alexandre Mankovskyi
  - ( 7.) Alexandre Boudnikov
  - ( 8.) Andrey Tcheboharev
  - ( 9.) Vladimir Kachkar
  - (10.) Nikolay Sankovets
  - (11.) Stepan Klimovitch
  - (12.) Yuriy Korotchenho
  - (13.) Albert Vintskevich
  - (14.) Igor Pakhalchuk
  - (15.) Igor Tsarev
  - (16.) Valentinas Vachkis
  - Head coach

unknown

Belgium
  - ( 1.) Vincent Deneumostier (gk)
  - ( 2.) Hugues Ciselet
  - ( 3.) John Toussaint
  - ( 4.) Thierry Renaer
  - ( 5.) Maximilien Willems
  - ( 6.) Sebastien Mommens
  - ( 7.) Joeri Beunen
  - ( 8.) Philippe van Hemelen
  - ( 9.) Alexandre de Chaffoy
  - (10.) Michel Kinnen
  - (11.) Gérald Dewamme
  - (12.) Patrick Pille
  - (13.) Mick Beunen
  - (14.) Jean Willems
  - (15.) Marc Coudron
  - (16.) Yves Henet (gk)
  - Head coach

unknown

Canada
  - ( 1.) Hari Kant (gk)
  - ( 2.) Mike Mahood (gk)
  - ( 3.) Ian Bird
  - ( 4.) Alan Brahmst
  - ( 5.) Robin d'Abreo
  - ( 6.) Chris Gifford
  - ( 7.) Patrick Burrows
  - ( 8.) Andrew Griffiths
  - ( 9.) Ken Pereira
  - (10.) Bubli Chohan
  - (11.) Peter Milkovich
  - (12.) Bindi Kullar
  - (13.) Rob Short
  - (14.) Rob Edamura
  - (15.) Marek Gacek
  - (16.) Rick Roberts
  - Head coach

Shiaz Virjee

Ireland
  - ( 1.) Ivan Bateman (gk)
  - ( 2.) Nigel Henderson
  - ( 3.) Neil Cooke
  - ( 4.) Alan Dowd
  - ( 5.) Alastair Dunne
  - ( 6.) Colin Hade
  - ( 7.) Chris Jackson
  - ( 8.) Erroll Lutton
  - ( 9.) David McAnulty
  - (10.) Mark Irwin
  - (11.) Gregg Ian Sterritt
  - (12.) Julian Stevenson
  - (13.) Robert Taylor
  - (14.) Lee Tumilty
  - (15.) Mark Tumilty
  - (16.) Daniel Clarke
  - Head coach

unknown

Malaysia
  - ( 1.) Paul Lopez
  - ( 2.) Singh Maninderijt
  - ( 3.) Lailin Abu Hassan
  - ( 4.) Singh Kerpal
  - ( 5.) Kuhan Shanmuganathan
  - ( 6.) Nor Azian Haji Bakar
  - ( 7.) Chairil Anwar Abdul Aziz
  - ( 8.) Lam Mun Fatt
  - ( 9.) Shanker Ramu
  - (10.) Nor Saiful Nasiruddin
  - (11.) Kaliswaran Muniandy
  - (12.) Singh Aphthar
  - (13.) Mirnawan Nawawi
  - (14.) Mohammed Nizam Nordin
  - (15.) Arul Selvaraj Anthonisamy
  - (16.) Ahmad Suffian
  - Head coach

Volker Knapp

New Zealand
  - ( 1.) Paul Derham
  - ( 2.) Dion Gosling
  - ( 3.) Greg Russ
  - ( 4.) Umesh Parag
  - ( 5.) Darren Smith
  - ( 6.) Andrew Timlin
  - ( 7.) Brett Leaver
  - ( 8.) Andrew Buckley
  - ( 9.) Ken Robinson
  - (10.) Jamie Smith
  - (11.) Simon Towns
  - (12.) John Radovonich
  - (13.) Richard Tattershaw
  - (14.) Andrew van der Bent
  - (15.) Scott Anderson (gk)
  - (16.) Grant Croft (gk)
  - Head coach

Jim Cahill

Poland
  - ( 1.) Paweł Sobczak (gk)
  - ( 2.) Slawomir Lukaszewski
  - ( 3.) Paweł Jakubiak
  - ( 4.) Dariusz Małecki
  - ( 5.) Maciej Matuszynski
  - ( 6.) Tomasz Szmidt
  - ( 7.) Robert Grzeszczak
  - ( 8.) Zbigniew Juszczak
  - ( 9.) Marcin Nyckowiak
  - (10.) Rafał Grotowski
  - (11.) Karol Podzorski
  - (12.) Marcin Pobuta (gk)
  - (13.) Krzysztof Wybieralski
  - (14.) Lukasz Wybieralski
  - (15.) Piotr Mikula
  - (16.) Tomasz Cichy
  - Head coach

Mariusz Kubiak

South Africa
  - ( 1.) Brian Myburgh (gk)
  - ( 2.) Gregor Maier (gk)
  - ( 3.) Shaun Cooke
  - ( 4.) Craig Jackson
  - ( 5.) Craig Fulton
  - ( 6.) Bradley Michalaro
  - ( 7.) Gregg Clark
  - ( 8.) Gary Boddington
  - ( 9.) Wayne Denne
  - (10.) Mike Cullen
  - (11.) Kevin Chree
  - (12.) Grant Fulton
  - (13.) Greg Nicol
  - (14.) Matthew Hallowes
  - (15.) Grant Von Mayer
  - (16.) Brenton Key
  - Head coach

unknown

South Korea
  - ( 1.) Koo Jin-Soo (gk)
  - ( 2.) Ji Seung-Hwan
  - ( 3.) Han Beung-Kook
  - ( 4.) Han Hyung-Bae
  - ( 5.) Cho Myung-Jun
  - ( 6.) Jeon Jong-Ha
  - ( 7.) Hong Kyung-Seon
  - ( 8.) Shin Seok-Kyo
  - ( 9.) Song Seung-Tae
  - (10.) Kang Keon-Wook
  - (11.) Jeong Yong-Kyun
  - (12.) Lee Young-Hwang
  - (13.) Kim Jung-Chul
  - (14.) Yoo Mun-Ki
  - (15.) Yeo Woon-Kon
  - (16.) Kim Yoon (gk)
  - Head coach

unknown

Spain
  - ( 1.) Ramón Jufresa (gk)
  - ( 2.) Jordi Casas
  - ( 3.) Joaquin Malgosa
  - ( 4.) Jordi Arnau
  - ( 5.) Juan de Dios
  - ( 6.) Jaime Amat
  - ( 7.) Juan Escarré
  - ( 8.) Victor Pujol
  - ( 9.) Josep Sánchez
  - (10.) Narcis Ventallo
  - (11.) Javier Arnau
  - (12.) Ramon Sala
  - (13.) Francisco Fabregas
  - (14.) Pablo Amat
  - (15.) Pablo Usoz
  - (16.) Antonio González (gk)
  - Head coach

Toni Forrellat

Switzerland
  - ( 1.) Roger Thoma
  - ( 2.) Adrian Berger
  - ( 3.) Christian Arnold
  - ( 4.) Reto Muggli
  - ( 5.) Matthias Conz
  - ( 6.) Stefan Bircher
  - ( 7.) Daniel Pfister
  - ( 8.) Benjamin Steinemann
  - ( 9.) Alex Wintenberger
  - (10.) Toni Haberthur
  - (11.) Patrick Stutz
  - (12.) Oliver Bilgerig
  - (13.) Andy Gasser
  - (14.) Thierry Grandchamp
  - (15.) Christian Cavallet
  - (16.) Hugo Lessert
  - Head coach

Paul Schneider

== Preliminary round ==
=== Group A ===
	Team	Points	G	W	D	L	GF	GA	Diff
1.	Spain	15	5	5	0	0	14	4	+10
2.	Poland	9	5	3	0	2	16	16	0
3.	Malaysia	7	5	2	1	2	16	16	0
4.	Canada	6	5	2	0	3	13	15	–2
5.	Switzerland	5	5	1	2	3	11	15	–4
6.	South Africa	1	5	0	1	4	13	17	–4

1997-03-04

Malaysia	4 – 5	Poland
Mirnawan Nawawi 11'; Kaliswaran Muniandy 19'; Mirnawan Nawawi 66'; Mirnawan Nawawi 70'		Marcin Nyckowiak 12'; Slawomir Lukaszewski 16' (pc); Karol Podzorski 24'; Maciej Matuszynski 59'; Robert Grzeszczak 69'

Umpires:
Ray O'Connor (IRL)
Peter von Reth (NED)

1997-03-05

Switzerland	1 – 4	Spain
Benjamin Steinemann 64' (pc)		Javier Arnau 22' (pc); Narcis Ventallo 35'; Javier Arnau 45'; Javier Arnau 63'

Umpires:
Nor Piza Hassan (MAS)
Edmundo Saladino (ARG)

1997-03-05

Canada	5 – 4	South Africa
Marek Gacek 28'; Andrew Griffiths 52'; Peter Milkovich 65'; Chris Gifford 67' (pc); Andrew Griffiths 69'		Greg Nicol 17' (pc); Greg Nicol 19'; Gregg Clark 47' (pc); Mike Cullen 49'

Umpires:
Eric Denis (BEL)
Jason McCracken (NZL)

1997-03-06

Poland	0 – 1	Spain
		Javier Arnau 23'

Umpires:
Nor Piza Hassan (MAS)
Jason McCracken (NZL)

1997-03-06

Canada	1 – 4	Malaysia
Rob Short 35'		Abdul Rahman Shaiful Azli 49' (pc); Chairil Anwar Abdul Aziz 52' (pc); Arul Selvaraj Anthonisamy 59'; Abdul Rahman Shaiful Azli 67'

Umpires:
Nirut Woningang (THA)
Ray O'Connor (IRL).

1997-03-06

South Africa	2 – 2	Switzerland
Gary Boddington 7'; Greg Nicol 11'		Olivier Bilgerig 65'; Olivier Bilgerig 67' (pc)

Umpires:
Steven Horgan (USA)
Zaidi Irfan (PAK)

1997-03-07

Spain	2 – 0	Canada
Javier Arnau 12'; Javier Arnau 65'

Umpires:
Jason McCracken (NZL)
Edmundo Saladinon (ARG)

1997-03-08

Malaysia	4 – 3	South Africa
scorers unknown		scorers unknown

Umpires:
Eric Denis (BEL)
Nirut Woningang (THA)

1997-03-08

Switzerland	3 – 5	Poland
scorers unknown		scorers unknown

Umpires:
Nor Piza Hassan (Mal)
Peter von Reth (NED)

1997-03-09

Malaysia	2 – 2	Switzerland
Chairil Anwar Abdul Aziz 44'; Nor Saiful Nasiruddin 55' (pc)		Olivier Bilgerig 58'; Benjamin Steinemann 69' (pc)

Umpires:
Zaidi Irfan (PAK)
Edmundo Saladino (ARG)

1997-03-10

Poland	2 – 5	Canada
Piotr Mikula 7'; Slawomir Lukaszewski 69' (pc)		Peter Milkovich 10' (ps); Chris Gifford 17'; Ken Pereira 28'; Rob Short 39'; Rob Short 54'

Umpires:
Eric Denis (BEL)
Steven Horgan (USA)

1997-03-10

South Africa	1 – 2	Spain
Gregg Clark 30' (pc)		Pablo Usoz 13' (pc); Juan Escarré 67'

Umpires:
Ray O'Connor (IRL)
Jason McCracken (NZL)

1997-03-11

Switzerland	3 – 2	Canada
Christian Cavallet 40' (pc); Thierry Grandchamp 42'; Benjamin Steinemann 70'		Marek Gacek 49' (pc); Peter Milkovich 61' (pc)

Umpires:
Nor Piza Hassan (MAS)
Nirut Woningang (THA)

1997-03-11

South Africa	3 – 4	Poland
Greg Nicol 6'; Greg Nicol 23' (pc); Gary Boddington 49'		Karol Podzorski 7'; Karol Podzorski 28'; Krzysztof Wybieralski 34'; Krzysztof Wybieralski 66'

Umpires:
Edmundo Saladino (ARG)
Zaidi Irfan (PAK)

1997-03-11

Spain	5 – 2	Malaysia
Juan Escarré 6'; Jordi Casas 47' (pc); Jordi Casas 60' (pc); Javier Arnau 65' (ps); Juan Escarré 66'		Abdul Rahman Shaiful Azli 8' (pc); Nor Saiful Nasiruddin 21' (pc)

Umpires:
Peter von Reth (NED)
Eric Denis (BEL)

=== Group B ===
	Team	Points	G	W	D	L	GF	GA	Diff
1.	South Korea	13	5	4	1	0	18	10	+8
2.	New Zealand	10	5	3	1	1	10	5	+5
3.	Argentina	9	5	3	0	2	22	11	+11
4.	Belgium	7	5	2	1	2	15	16	–1
5.	Ireland	4	5	1	1	3	7	17	–10
6.	Belarus	0	5	0	0	5	10	23	–13

1997-03-04

Belgium	2 – 1	Ireland
Joeri Beunen 3' (pc); Gérald Dewamme 61'		Alastair Dunne 51' (pc)

Umpires:
Xavier Adell (ESP)
Steven Horgan (USA)

1997-03-04

New Zealand	3 – 1	Argentina
John Radovonich 10'; Richard Tattershaw 26' (pc); Umesh Parag 36'		Jorge Lombi 14' (pc)

Umpires:
Garth Proudfoot (RSA)
John Wright (RSA)

1997-03-04

South Korea	4 – 2	Belarus
Kang Keon-Wook 13'; Shin Seok-Kyo 19'; Jeong Yong-Kyun 34' (pc); Yoo Mun-Ki 38'		Stepan Klimovitch 14'; Yuriy Korotchenho 60'

Umpires:
Amarjit Singh (MAS)
Surjit Singh (MAS)

1997-03-05

New Zealand	2 – 0	Belarus
John Radovonich 13'; Richard Tattershaw 51' (pc)

Umpires:
Zaidi Irfan (PAK)
Andrez Budasz (POL)

1997-03-05

Ireland	1 – 3	South Korea
Julian Stevenson 62'		Song Seung-Tae 44'; Song Seung-Tae 49'; Song Seung-Tae 69'

Umpires:
Nirut Woningang (THA)
Steven Horgan (USA)

1997-03-06

Argentina	3 – 1	Belgium
Jorge Lombi 21'; Rodolfo Pérez 37'; Santiago Capurro 50'		Alexandre de Chaffoy 26'

Umpires:
Peter von Reth (NED)
Surjit Singh (MAS)

1997-03-07

Argentina	9 – 1	Ireland
Carlos Geneyro 11'; Rodolfo Pérez 24'; Santiago Capurro 34'; Jorge Lombi 42' (ps); Santiago Capurro 45'; Jorge Lombi 46' (pc); Eduardo Peralta 53'; Carlos Geneyro 56' (pc); Germán Orozco 58'		Neil Cooke 50' (pc)

Umpires:
Amarjit Singh (MAS)
Andrez Budasz (POL)

1997-03-07

South Korea	2 – 1	New Zealand
Kang Keon-Wook 25'; Shin Seok-Kyo 45'		Brett Leaver 40' (pc)

Umpires:
Peter von Reth (NED)
John Wright (RSA).

1997-03-07

Belarus	5 – 7	Belgium
Alexandre Boudnikov 33'; Yuri Korotchenho 56'; Dmitri Youkovski 59'; Vladimir Kachkar 62' (pc); Nikolay Sankovets 66'		Marc Coudron 3'; Gérald Dewamme 15'; Joeri Beunen 19'; Alexandre de Chaffoy 34'; Jean Willems 49'; Joeri Beunen 54' (pc); Jean Willems 57'

Umpires:
Garth Proudfoot (RSA)
Xavier Adell (ESP)

1997-03-09

Ireland	1 – 1	New Zealand
Robert Taylor 57' (pc)		Jamie Smith 42'

Umpires:
Surjit Singh (MAS) en Garth Proudfoot (RSA).

1997-03-09

Belarus	1 – 7	Argentina
Dmitri Youkovski 5' (pc)		Rodolfo Pérez 13' (pc0 Maximiliano Caldas 20' (pc); Carlos Geneyro 23'; Santiago Capurro 51'; Santiago Capurro 52'; Santiago Capurro 55'; Carlos Geneyro 68'

Umpires:
Wen-Yaw Chang (TPE)
Xavier Adell (ESP)

1997-03-09

Belgium	4 – 4	South Korea
Joeri Beunen 2' (pc); Philippe van Hemelen 11' (pc); Jean Willems 60' (ps); Joeri Beunen 64' (pc)		Song Seung-Tae 5'; Kang Keon-Wook 23'; Shin Seok-Kyo 24' (pc); Kang Keon-Wook 29'

Umpires:
Andrez Budasz (POL)
John Wright (RSA)

1997-03-10

Belarus	2 – 3	Ireland
Dmitri Youkovski 6' (pc); Nikolay Sankovets 28'		Daniel Clarke 10'; David McAnulty 59'; Julian Stevenson 60'

Umpires:
Andrez Budasz (POL)
Garth Proudfoot (RSA)

1997-03-10

New Zealand	3 – 1	Belgium
John Radovonich 63'; John Radovonich 67'; John Radovonich 69'		Alexandre de Chaffoy 3'

Umpires:
Wen-Yaw Chang (TPE)
Amarjit Singh (MAS)

1997-03-11

South Korea	5 – 2	Argentina
Hong Kyung-Seon 2'; Song Seung-Tae 13'; Kang Keon-Wook 24'; Kang Keon-Wook 34'; Song Seung-Tae 43'		Carlos Geneyro 28' (pc); Rodolfo Pérez 42' (pc)

Umpires:
Wen-Yaw Chang (TPE)
Ray O'Connor (IRL)

== Crossovers ==
9th/12th place
1997-03-13

South Africa	4 – 0	Ireland
Greg Nicol 28'; Mike Cullen 43'; Craig Fulton 65'; Greg Nicol 66'

Umpires:
unknown

9th/12th place
1997-03-13

Switzerland	2 – 0	Belarus
Patrick Stutz 18'; Alex Wintenberger 31'

Umpires:
unknown

5th/8th place
1997-03-13

Canada	2 – 0	Argentina
Peter Milkovich 5'; Peter Milkovich 42' (ps)

Umpires:
unknown

5th/8th place
1997-03-13

Malaysia	3 – 0	Belgium
Abdul Rahman Shaiful Azli 42' (pc); Abdul Rahman Shaiful Azli 66' (pc); Nor Saiful Nasiruddin 69'

Umpires:
unknown

1st/4th place
1997-03-13

Spain	5 – 1	New Zealand
Javier Arnau 3'; Javier Arnau 6' (pc); Juan Escarré 13'; Victor Pujol 60' (pc); Jordi Casas 68' (pc)		Ken Robinson 30'

Umpires:
unknown

1st/4th place
1997-03-13

Poland	0 – 1	South Korea
		Song Seung-Tae 37'

Umpires:
unknown

== Placement matches ==
11th place
1997-03-14

Belarus	2 – 1	Ireland
Vladimir Kachkar 13' (pc); Igor Tsarev 29'		Julian Stevenson 43'

Umpires:
unknown

9th place
1997-03-14

South Africa	3 – 2	Switzerland
Mike Cullen 5'; Greg Nicol 32'; Brenton Key 52' (pc)		Stefan Bircher 41' (pc); Christian Cavallet 53'

Umpires:
unknown

7th place
1997-03-14

Argentina	2 – 1	Belgium
Rodolfo Pérez 10'; Santiago Capurro 62'		Philippe van Hemelen 45'

Umpires:
unknown

5th place
1997-03-14

Malaysia	1 – 3	Canada
Kaliswaran Muniandy 23'		Peter Milkovich 2' (pc); Andrew Griffiths 29' (pc); Robin d'Abreo 31'

Umpires:
unknown

3rd place
1997-03-15

Poland	0 – 3	New Zealand
		John Radovonich 22'; John Radovonich 26'; Ken Robinson 54'

Umpires:
unknown

== Final ==
1st place
1997-03-15

South Korea	2 – 3 [aet]	Spain
Song Seung-Tae 23'; Kang Keon-Wook 28'		Jordi Casas 22' (pc); Javier Arnau 54'; Pablo Amat 81'

Umpires:
unknown

== Final ranking ==
RANK	TEAM
1.	Spain
2.	South Korea
3.	New Zealand
4.	Poland
5.	Canada
6.	Malaysia
7.	Argentina
8.	Belgium
9.	South Africa
10.	Switzerland
11.	Belarus
12.	Ireland

== Remarks ==
- The first six (Spain, South Korea, New Zealand, Poland, Canada, and Malaysia) participated in the 1998 Men's Hockey World Cup in Utrecht, Netherlands.

== See also ==
- 1997 Women's Field Hockey World Cup Qualifier
