= 1998 Men's Hockey World Cup squads =

This article lists the confirmed squads for the 1998 Men's Hockey World Cup tournament which was held in Utrecht, Netherlands between 21 May and 1 June 1998.

== Pool A ==
=== Canada ===
The following players were named for the Canada team.

1. Hari Kant (GK)
2. Mike Mahood (GK)
3. Ian Bird
4. Alan Brahmst
5. Robin D'Abreo
6. Chris Gifford (C)
7. Patrick Burrows
8. Andrew Griffiths
9. Ken Pereira
10. Scott Mosher
11. Peter Milkovich
12. Bindi Kullar
13. Rob Short
14. Ronnie Jagday
15. Marek Gacek
16. Rick Roberts

=== Germany ===
The following players were named for the Germany team.

1. Christopher Reitz (GK)
2. Nils Kowalczek (GK)
3. Jan-Peter Tewes
4. Philipp Crone
5. Christian Blunck (C)
6. Martin Eimer
7. Bjorn Michel
8. Sascha Reinelt
9. Oliver Domke
10. Christoph Eimer
11. Michael Waldhauser
12. Christoph Bechmann
13. Michael Green
14. Klaus Michler
15. Patrick Bellenbaum
16. Christian Mayerhofer

=== India ===
The following players were named for the India team.

1. Jude Menezes (GK)
2. Dilip Tirkey
3. Anil Aldrin
4. Baljit Singh Saini
5. Mohammed Riaz
6. Ramandeep Singh
7. Mukesh Kumar
8. Sabu Varkey
9. Dhanraj Pillay
10. Rajesh Chauhan
11. Sameer Dad
12. Jagdish Ponnappa (GK)
13. Lazarus Barla
14. Thirumal Valavan
15. Devinder Kumar
16. Harbhajan Singh

=== Netherlands ===
The following players were named for the Netherlands team.

1. Ronald Jansen (GK)
2. Bram Lomans
3. Leo Klein Gebbink
4. Erik Jazet
5. Tycho van Meer
6. Wouter van Pelt
7. Sander van der Weide
8. Jacques Brinkman
9. Piet-Hein Geeris
10. Stephan Veen (C)
11. Rogier van 't Hek
12. Jeroen Delmee
13. Bart Looije (GK)
14. Teun de Nooijer
15. Remco van Wijk
16. Jaap-Derk Buma

=== New Zealand ===
The following players were named for the New Zealand team.

1. Andrew Timlin
2. Dion Gosling
3. Paul Derham
4. Umesh Parag
5. Darren Smith
6. Andrew Hastie
7. Brett Leaver
8. John Radovonich
9. Ken Robinson
10. Jamie Smith
11. Simon Towns
12. Hymie Gill
13. Richard Tattershaw
14. Bevan Hari
15. Scott Anderson (C, GK)
16. Michael Bevin (GK)

=== South Korea ===
The following players were named for the South Korea team.

1. Koo Jin-soo (GK)
2. Shin Seok-kyo
3. Han Beung-kook
4. Han Hyung-bae
5. Cho Myung-jun (C)
6. Jeon Jong-ha
7. Hong Kyung-suep
8. Park Shin-heum
9. Song Seung-tae
10. Kang Keon-wook
11. Jeong Yong-kyun
12. Young Lee
13. Kim Young-kyu
14. Yoo Moon-ki
15. Yeo Woon-kon
16. Ko Dong (GK)

== Pool B ==
=== Australia ===
The following players were named for the Australia team.

1. Baeden Choppy
2. Michael Brennan
3. Stephen Davies
4. Jason Duff
5. Matthew Smith
6. Adam Commens
7. Damon Diletti (GK)
8. Lachlan Dreher (GK)
9. Stephen Holt
10. Paul Gaudoin
11. Paul Lewis
12. Lachlan Elmer
13. Jay Stacy
14. Daniel Sproule
15. David Wansbrough
16. Michael York (C)

=== England ===
The following players were named for the England team.

1. Simon Mason (GK)
2. David Luckes (GK)
3. Jon Wyatt
4. Julian Halls
5. Bill Waugh (C)
6. Andy Humphrey
7. Justin Pidcock
8. Ben Sharpe
9. Jason Lee
10. Nick Thompson
11. Brett Garrard
12. Duncan Woods
13. Russell Garcia
14. Jimmy Wallis
15. Calum Giles
16. Mark Pearn

=== Malaysia ===
The following players were named for the Malaysia team.

1. Paul Lopez (GK)
3. Lailin Abu Hassan
4. Keevan Raj Kali Kavandan
5. Kuhan Shanmuganathan
6. Nor Haji
7. Chairil Anwar Abdul Aziz
8. Brian Siva
9. Ramu Shankar
10. Nor Nasiruddin (C)
11. Kaliswaran Muniandy
12. Aphthar Singh
13. Mirnawan Nawawi
14. Fernandez Calvin
15. Arul Anthoni
16. Nasihini Ibrahim (GK)

=== Pakistan ===
The following players were named for the Pakistan team.

1. Ahmed Alam (GK)
2. Ali Raza
3. Tariq Imran
4. Muhammad Usman
5. Imran Yousaf
6. Waseem Ahmed
7. Rahim Khan
8. Tahir Zaman (C)
9. Kamran Ashraf
10. Shahbaz Ahmed
11. Muhammad Shahbaz
12. Muhammad Qasim (GK)
13. Alam Naveed
14. Sohail Abbas
15. Atif Bashir
16. Muhammad Nadeem

=== Poland ===
The following players were named for the Poland team.

1. Pawel Sobczak (GK)
2. Slawomir Lukaszewski (C)
3. Pawel Jakubiak
4. Dariusz Malecki
5. Maciej Matuszynski
6. Tomasz Szmidt
7. Robert Grzeszczak
8. Zbigniew Juszczak
10. Rafal Grotowski
11. Karol Podzorski
12. Marcin Pobuta (GK)
13. Krzysztof Wybieralski
14. Tomasz Choczaj
15. Piotr Mikuła
16. Pietr Adrian

=== Spain ===
The following players were named for the Spain team.

1. Ramon Jufresa (GK)
2. Joaquim Malgosa (C)
3. Jaume Amat
4. Francisco Fábregas Monegal
5. Jordi Arnau
6. Juan Escarré
7. Victor Pujol
8. Pablo Amat
9. Jordi Casas
10. Javier Arnau
11. Ramon Sala
12. Juan Dinarés
13. Josep Sánchez
14. Pablo Usoz
15. Albert Gomez (GK)
16. Xavier Ribas
