= Hockey at the 1998 Commonwealth Games – Men's team squads =

This article lists the squads of the men's hockey competition at the Bukit Jalil Stadium in Kuala Lumpur, Malaysia from 9 – 20 September 1998.

== Australia ==
Head coach: Terry Walsh

- Michael Brennan
- Adam Commens
- Stephen Davies
- Damon Diletti (gk)
- Jason Duff
- James Elmer
- Paul Gaudoin
- Mark Hickman (gk)
- Jeremy Hiskins
- Stephen Holt
- Brent Livermore
- Matthew Smith
- Daniel Sproule
- Jay Stacy
- Lachlan Vivian-Taylor
- Michael York

== Canada ==
Head coach: Shiaz Virjee

- Ian Bird
- Robin D'Abreo
- Marek Gacek
- Thomas Green
- Ronnie Jagday
- Hari Kant (gk)
- Bindi Kullar
- Mike Mahood
- Peter Milkovich
- Scott Mosher
- Ken Pereira
- Rick Roberts
- Rob Short
- Paul Wettlaufer
- Brent Wilsmore
- David Yule

== England ==
Head coach: Barry Dancer

Bobby Crutchley

- Guy Fordham
- Julian Halls
- Stuart Head
- Russell Garcia
- Brett Garrard
- Michael Johnson
- David Luckes (gk)
- Simon Mason (gk)
- Mark Pearn
- Justin Pidcock
- Ben Sharpe
- Jimmy Wallis
- Bill Waugh
- Duncan Woods
- Jon Wyatt

== India ==
Head coach: Maharaj Krishan Kaushik

- Lazarus Barla
- Baljit Singh Dhillon
- Cheops DCosta
- Mukesh Kumar
- Sanjeev Kumar
- Dhanraj Pillay
- Lakshmanan Prabhakaran
- Jude Menezes (gk)
- Mohammed Riaz
- Baljit Singh Saini
- Gagan Ajit Singh
- Ramandeep Singh
- A. B. Subbaiah (gk)
- Dilip Tirkey
- Thirumal Valavan
- Sabu Varkey

== Kenya ==
Head coach:

- Moses Okunyani Aura
- Godfrey Odongo Bila
- Kenneth Mindungo Kaunda
- Inderjit Singh Matharu
- Nicholas Induli Ngaira
- Raymond Ondong Ochola
- Donald Cliff Odendo
- Simon William Odera-Okech
- Erac Milton Oile Odingo
- John Eliud Okoth
- Jotham Clement Omany
- George Osewew Omondi
- Brian Adula Onyango
- Ajay Dinesh Kumar-Dosaja
- Joel Meshack Senge
- Gurbinder Singh Sohal

== Malaysia ==
Head coach:

- Nur Azlan Bakar
- Nor Saiful Zaini
- Mirnawan Nawawi
- Roslan Jamaluddin
- Calvin Fernandez
- Gobinathan Krishnamurthy
- Maninderjit Singh
- Chairil Anwar Abdul Aziz
- Keevan Raj
- Kuhan Shanmuganathan
- Mohamed Madzli Ikmar
- Kaliswaran Muniandy
- Kali Logan Raj
- Shankar Ramu
- Mohamad Syayrin Uda Karim
- Suhaimi Ibrahim
- Chua Boon Huat

== New Zealand ==
Head coach: Keith Gorringe

- Scott Anderson (gk)
- Ryan Archibald
- Michael Bevin
- Andrew Buckley
- Hymie Gill
- Dion Gosling
- Bevan Hari
- Andrew Hastie
- Brett Leaver
- Wayne McIndoe
- Umesh Parag
- Mitesh Patel
- Ken Robinson
- Darren Smith
- Andrew Timlin
- Simon Towns

== Pakistan ==
Head coach:

- Ahmed Alam (gk)

== South Africa ==
Head coach:

- Murray Anderson
- Warren Bond
- Kevin Chree
- Gregg Clark
- Justin Clyde Abrahams
- Mike Cullen
- Craig Fulton
- Craig Jackson
- Brenton Key
- Justin King
- Brad Michalaro
- Brad Milne
- Gareth Murray
- Brian Myburgh
- Greg Nicol
- Emile Smith

== Trinidad & Tobago ==
Head coach:

- Roger Daniel
- Kwan Dwane
- Peter Edwards
- Ronald De Silva
- Glenn Francis
- David Francois
- Raphael Govia
- Aldon Jasp
- Joseph Lewis
- Anthony Marcano
- Kurt Nokeiga
- Dwain Quanchan
- Nicholas Wren

== Wales ==
Head coach: David Bunyan

- Chris Ashcroft
- Alistair Carruthers
- Anthony Colclough
- Paul Edwards
- Graeme Egan
- Owen Griffiths-Jones
- Andrew Grimes
- David Hacker
- Ian Hughes-Rowlands
- Zak Jones
- Martin Lindley
- Richard Markham
- Tyrone Moore
- Clive O'Sullivan
- Simon Organ
- Kevin Priday
- Jamie Westerman
- Michael Williamson

== See also ==
- Hockey at the 1998 Commonwealth Games – Women's team squads
