= Field hockey at the 2000 Summer Olympics – Men's team squads =

The article list the confirmed men's squads for Olympic Hockey Tournament at the 2000 Summer Olympics in Sydney, Australia.

== Pool A ==
=== Canada ===
Head Coach: Shiaz Virjee

1. Hari Kant (GK)
2. Mike Mahood (GK)
3. Ian Bird
4. Alan Brahmst
5. Robin D'Abreo
6. Chris Gifford
8. Andrew Griffiths
9. Ken Pereira
10. Scott Mosher
11. Peter Milkovich (c)
12. Bindi Kullar
13. Rob Short
14. Ronnie Jagday
15. Sean Campbell
18. Paul Wettlaufer
21. Ravi Kahlon

=== Germany ===
Head Coach: Paul Lissek

1. Christopher Reitz (GK)
2. Clemens Arnold (GK)
4. Philipp Crone
6. Christian Wein
7. Björn Michel
8. Sascha Reinelt
9. Oliver Domke
10. Christoph Eimer
11. Björn Emmerling
12. Christoph Bechmann
13. Michael Green
14. Tibor Weißenborn
15. Florian Kunz
16. Christian Mayerhöfer (c)
17. Matthias Witthaus
18. Ulrich Moissl

=== Great Britain ===
Head Coach: Barry Dancer

1. Simon Mason (GK)
2. David Luckes (GK)
3. Jon Wyatt (c)
4. Julian Halls
5. Tom Bertram
6. Craig Parnham
7. Guy Fordham
8. Ben Sharpe
9. Mark Pearn
10. Jimmy Wallis
11. Brett Garrard
12. Bill Waugh
13. Daniel Hall
14. Michael Johnson
15. Calum Giles
16. David Hacker

=== Malaysia ===
Head Coach: Stephen van Huizen

1. Jamaluddin Roslan (GK)
2. Maninderjit Singh Magmar
3. Chua Boon Huat
4. Krishnamurthy Gobinathan
5. Kuhan Shanmuganathan
6. Nor Azlan Bakar
7. Chairil Anwar
8. Mohan Jiwa
9. Ibrahim Suhaimi
10. Mohamed Madzli Ikmar
11. Nor Saiful Zaini
12. Keevan Raj
13. Mirnawan Nawawi (c)
14. Calvin Fernandez
15. Saiful Azli bin Abdul Rahman
16. Mohamed Nasihin Nubil Ibrahim (GK)

=== Netherlands ===
Head Coach: Maurits Hendriks

1. Ronald Jansen (GK)
2. Bram Lomans
3. Diederik van Weel
4. Erik Jazet
5. Peter Windt
6. Wouter van Pelt
7. Sander van der Weide
8. Jacques Brinkman
9. Piet-Hein Geeris
10. Stephan Veen (c)
11. Marten Eikelboom
12. Jeroen Delmee
13. Guus Vogels (GK)
14. Teun de Nooijer
15. Remco van Wijk
16. Jaap-Derk Buma

=== Pakistan ===
Head Coach: Ahmad Iftikhar

1. Ahmed Alam (GK) (c)
2. Ali Raza
3. Tariq Imran
4. Irfan Yousaf
5. Imran Yousuf
6. Waseem Ahmed
7. Mohammad Nadeem
8. Atif Bashir
9. Kamran Ashraf
10. Muhammad Sarwar
12. Mohammad Qasim (GK)
13. Sohail Abbas
14. Muhammad Shafqat Malik
15. Sameer Hussain
16. Kashif Jawwad
17. Muhammad Anis Ahmed

== Pool B ==
=== Argentina ===
Head Coach: Jorge Ruiz

1. Pablo Moreira (GK) (c)
2. Juan Pablo Hourquebie
3. Máximo Pellegrino
4. Matias Vila
5. Ezequiel Paulón
6. Mariano Chao
7. Mario Almada
8. Carlos Retegui
9. Rodrigo Vila
10. Tomás MacCormik
11. Santiago Capurro
12. Marcos Riccardi
13. Jorge Lombi
14. Fernando Zylberberg
15. Germán Orozco
16. Fernando Oscaris

=== Australia ===
Head Coach: Terry Walsh

2. Michael Brennan
3. Adam Commens
4. Jason Duff
5. Troy Elder
6. James Elmer
7. Damon Diletti (GK)
8. Lachlan Dreher (GK)
10. Paul Gaudoin
13. Jay Stacy
14. Daniel Sproule
15. Stephen Davies
16. Michael York (c)
17. Craig Victory
21. Stephen Holt
23. Matthew Wells
25. Brent Livermore

=== India ===
Head Coach: Vasudevan Baskaran

1. Devesh Chauhan (GK)
2. Dilip Tirkey
3. Lazarus Barla
4. Baljit Singh Saini
5. Thirumal Valavan
6. Ramandeep Singh (c)
7. Mukesh Kumar
8. londa Riaz
9. Dhanraj Pillay
10. Baljit Singh Dhillon
11. Sameer Dad
12. Jude Menezes (GK)
13. Deepak Thakur
14. Gagan Ajit Singh
15. Sukhbir Singh Gill
17. Dinesh Nayak

=== Korea ===
Head Coach: Jeon Jae-Hong

1. Kim Yoon (GK)
2. Ji Seung-Hwan
3. Seo Jong-Ho
4. Kim Chel-Hwan
5. Kim Yong-Bae
6. Han Hyung-Bae
7. Kim Kyung-Seok
8. Kim Jung-Chul
9. Song Seung-Tae
10. Kang Keon-Wook (c)
11. Hwang Jong-Hyun
12. Lim Jung-Woo
13. Jeon Jong-Ha
14. Jeon Hong-Kwon
15. Yeo Woon-Kon
16. Lim Jong-Chun (GK)

=== Poland ===
Head Coach: Jerzy Wybieralski

1. Paweł Sobczak (GK)
3. Paweł Jakubiak
4. Dariusz Małecki
6. Tomasz Szmidt
7. Robert Grzeszczak (c)
8. Zbigniew Juszczak
10. Rafał Grotowski
13. Krzysztof Wybieralski
14. Tomasz Choczaj
15. Piotr Mikuła
17. Tomasz Cichy
19. Dariusz Marcinkowski
20. Łukasz Wybieralski
21. Aleksander Korcz
25. Eugeniusz Gaczkowski
30. Marcin Pobuta (GK)

=== Spain ===
Head Coach: Antonio Forrellat

1. Ramón Jufresa (GK)
2. Bernardino Herrera (GK)
3. Joaquim Malgosa (c)
4. Jaume Amat
5. Francisco "Kiko" Fábregas
7. Juan Escarré
8. Jordi Casas
9. Pablo Amat
10. Eduard Tubau
11. Javier Arnau
12. Ramón Sala
13. Juan Dinarés
14. Josep Sánchez
15. Pablo Usoz
16. Xavier Ribas
18. Rodrigo Garza
