= Hockey at the 2002 Commonwealth Games – Men's team squads =

This article lists the squads of the men's hockey competition at the 2002 Commonwealth Games held at the Belle Vue Hockey in Manchester, England, from 27 July to 4 August 2002.

== Australia ==
Head coach: Barry Dancer

- Dean Butler
- Liam de Young
- Jamie Dwyer
- Troy Elder
- Paul Gaudoin (c)
- Bevan George
- Mark Hickman (gk)
- Aaron Hopkins
- Stephen Lambert (gk)
- Brent Livermore
- Michael McCann
- Matthew Smith
- Ben Taylor
- Craig Victory
- Scott Webster
- Matthew Wells

== Barbados ==
Head coach:

- Roger Bailey
- Mark Murray

== Canada ==
Head coach: Gene Muller

- Steve Campbell
- Robin D'Abreo
- Steve Davis
- Ranjeev Deo
- Wayne Fernandes
- Ravi Kahlon
- Bindi Kullar
- Michael Lee
- Jon Mackinnon (gk)
- Michael Mahood (gk)
- Mike Oliver
- Ken Pereira
- Rick Roberts
- Scott Sandison
- Rob Short
- Paul Wettlaufer

== England ==
Head coach: Malcolm Wood

- Jason Collins
- Brett Garrard
- Jerome Goudie
- Danny Hall
- Michael Johnson
- Jimi Lewis (gk)
- Simon Mason (gk)
- David Mathews
- Mark Pearn
- Craig Parnham (c)
- Jon Peckett
- Robert Todd
- Jimmy Wallis
- Bill Waugh
- Duncan Woods
- Jon Wyatt

== New Zealand ==
Head coach:

- Ryan Archibald
- Michael Bevin
- Phil Burrows
- Dean Couzins
- Dion Gosling
- Bevan Hari
- Blair Hopping
- David Kosoof
- Wayne McIndoe
- Umesh Parag
- Mitesh Patel
- Hayden Shaw
- Darren Smith
- Peter Stafford
- Simon Towns
- Paul Woolford

== Pakistan ==
Head coach:

- Sohail Abbas
- Waseem Ahmed
- Ahmed Alam
- Ghazanfar Ali
- Kamran Ashraf
- Zeeshan Ashraf
- Tariq Imran
- Kashif Jawad
- Mudassar Ali Khan
- Muhammad Khalid
- Muhammad Nadeem
- Muhammad Qasim
- Muhammad Saqlain
- Muhammad Sarwar
- Muhammad Shabbir
- Muhammad Usman

== South Africa ==
Head coach: Rob Pullen

- Clyde Abrahams
- Marvin Bam
- Kevin Chree
- Gregg Clark
- Mike Cullen
- Emile Smith
- Wayne Denne
- Denzil Dolley
- Steven Evans
- Craig Fulton
- Chris Hibbert
- Craig Jackson
- Bruce Jacobs
- Justin King
- Greg Nicol
- David Staniforth

== Wales ==
Head coach:

- Chris Ashcroft
- James Davies-Yandle
- Matthew Grace
- Paul Edwards
- Owen Griffiths-Jones
- George Harris (gk)
- Howard Hoskin
- Mark Hoskin
- Richard John
- Huw Jones
- Zak Jones (c)
- Rhys Joyce
- James Ogden
- Simon Organ
- Josh Smith
- Jamie Westerman

== See also ==
- Hockey at the 2002 Commonwealth Games – Women's team squads
