= 2004 Men's Field Hockey Olympic Qualifier =

Tournament details
- Host country: Spain
- City: Madrid
- Dates: 2–13 March
- Teams: 12 (from 5 confederations)
- Venue: Club de Campo

Final positions
- Champions: Netherlands (2nd title)
- Runner-up: Spain
- Third place: Pakistan

Tournament statistics
- Matches played: 42
- Goals scored: 197 (4.69 per match)
- Top scorer: (Pakistan) Sohail Abbas (10 goals)
- Best player: (Spain) Francisco Fábregas

The Men's Field Hockey Olympic Qualifier was the fourth edition of the Men's Field hockey Olympic Qualification Tournament. It was held at Club de Campo in Madrid, Spain from 2 until 13 March 2004. Twelve nations took part, and they played a round-robin tournament in two groups of six. The top six or seven teams qualified for the 2004 Summer Olympics in Athens, Greece.

== Squads ==
Belgium

Head Coach: Gilles Bonnet

1. Cédric Degreve (GK)
2. Xavier Reckinger
4. Thierry Renaer
5. Xavier-Charles Letier
6. Loïc Vandeweghe
7. Jean-Philippe Brulé
8. Thomas Van Den Balck
9. Maxime Luycx
10. Mike Dewever
11. Charles Vandeweghe
12. Dennis Dijkshoorn
13. Gilles Petre
14. Phillippe Goldberg
15. Marc Coudron (c)
16. Xavier Brooke
17. Manu Leroy (GK)
18. Patrice Houssein
Canada

Head Coach: Gene Muller

1. Bindi Kullar
2. Mike Mahood (GK)
3. Mike Oliver
5. Robin D'Abreo
6. Steve Davis
9. Ken Pereira
10. Wayne Fernandes
11. Peter Short
12. David Jameson
13. Rob Short (c)
14. Ronnie Jagday
15. Sean Campbell
16. Scott Sandison
18. Paul Wettlaufer
20. Ranjeev Deol
21. Ravi Kahlon
24. Connor Grimes
29. Jon MacKinnon
Great Britain

Head Coach: Jason Lee

1. Simon Mason (GK)
2. Jimi Lewis (GK)
3. Jason Collins
4. Russell Garcia
6. Craig Parnham
7. Niall Stott
8. Tom Bertram
9. Mark Pearn
10. Jimmy Wallis
11. Brett Garrard (c)
12. Ben Hawes
13. Danny Hall
14. Michael Johnson
15. Martin Jones
18. Barry Middleton
19. Graham Dunlop
22. Graham Moodie
India

Head Coach: Rajinder Singh

1. Devesh Chauhan (GK)
2. Kanwalpreet Singh
3. Dilip Tirkey (c)
4. Baljit Singh Saini
5. Bimal Lakra
6. Ignace Tirkey
8. Deepak Thakur
10. Baljit Singh Dhillon
11. Gagan Ajit Singh
12. Len Aiyappa
14. Prabhjot Singh
15. Daljit Singh Dhillon
18. Viren Rasquinha
20. William Xalxo
23. Arjun Halappa
26. Bhowath Chetri (GK)
28. Sandeel Michael
Japan

Head Coach: Yoshinori Takahashi

1. Takahiko Yamabori
2. Naoya Iwadate
3. Kenji Asai
4. Makoto Karuo
5. Ryuji Furasato
6. Akira Takahashi
7. Kenichi Katayama (c)
8. Naohiko Tobita
9. Kazuyuki Ozawa
10. Atsushi Takehara
11. Daisuke Hokaze
12. Akihiko Hirata
14. Mitsuru Ito
15. Jun Takahashi (GK)
16. Yasuhiro Nobui (GK)
19. Yasuhiro Kikkawa
21. Kazuo Yoshida
Malaysia

Head Coach: Paul Lissek

1. Roslan Jamaluddin (GK)
2. Muhamad Amin Rahim
3. Chua Boon Huat
4. Lugan Kali
5. Kuhan Shanmuganathan (c)
6. Nor Azlan Bakar
7. Gobinathan Krishnamurthy
8. Jiwa Mohan
9. Mohammed Madzli Ikmar
10. Tajol Rosli Mohamed
11. Mohamed Rodhanizam Radzi
12. Keevan Raj Kalikavandan
13. Ismail Abu
14. Azlan Misron
15. Norazlan Rahim
16. Kumar Subramamiam (GK)
17. Shanker Shanmugam
18. Mohammed Sukri Abdul
Netherlands

Head Coach: Terry Walsh

1. Guus Vogels (GK)
2. Bram Lomans
3. Geert-Jan Derikx
4. Erik Jazet
5. Rob Derikx
6. Floris Evers
7. Sander van der Weide
8. Ronald Brouwer
9. Piet-Hein Geeris
10. Taeke Taekema
12. Jeroen Delmee (c)
13. Klaas Veering (GK)
14. Teun de Nooijer
15. Karel Klaver
18. Rob Reckers
19. Matthijs Brouwer
21. Nick Meijer
22. Egbert Ho
New Zealand

Head Coach: Kevin Towns

1. Simon Towns (c)
2. Mitesh Patel
3. David Kosoof
4. Darren Smith
5. Wayne McIndoe
6. Dion Gosling
7. Blair Hopping
8. Dean Couzins
10. Ryan Archibald
11. Umesh Parag
13. Dharmesh Puna
16. Paul Woolford (GK)
17. Kyle Pontifex (GK)
18. Phil Burrows
19. Hayden Shaw
20. James Nation
22. Lloyd Stephenson
24. Gareth Brooks
Pakistan

Head Coach: Roelant Oltmans

1. Ahmed Alam (GK)
2. Muhammad Nadeem (c)
3. Kashif Jawwad
4. Ghazanfar Ali
5. Muhammad Saqlain
6. Waseem Ahmed
7. Dilawar Hussain
8. Rehan Butt
9. Sohail Abbas
10. Ali Raza
11. Shabbir Hussain
12. Salman Akbar (GK)
13. Mudassar Ali Khan
14. Muhammad Sarwar
15. Zeeshan Ashraf
16. Shakeel Abbasi
17. Adnan Maqsood
Poland

Head Coach: Jerzy Jóskowiak

1. Marcin Trzaskawka (GK)
2. Tomasz Dutkiewicz
3. Miroslaw Juszczak
5. Miroslaw Kluczynski
6. Sebastian Wladysiak
7. Marcin Grotowski
8. Zbigniew Juszczak
9. Dariusz Rachwalski
11. Marcin Nyckowiak
12. Arkadiusz Matuszak (GK)
13. Slawomir Choczaj
14. Tomasz Choczaj
15. Piotr Mikula (c)
16. Artur Mikula
17. Tomasz Gorny
18. Tomasz Marcinkowski
20. Krzystof Kmiec
South Africa

Head Coach: Paul Revington

1. David Staniforth (GK)
3. Ken Forbes
4. Craig Jackson (c)
5. Craig Fulton
6. Bruce Jacobs
7. Gregg Clark
8. Iain Evans
9. Emile Smith
11. Clyde Abrahams
13. Steve Evans
14. Eric Rose-Innes
16. Marvin Bam
17. Reece Basson
18. Wayne Denne
19. Chris Hibbert (GK)
22. Ian Symons
25. Ryan Ravenscroft
29. Greg Nicol
Spain

Head Coach: Maurits Hendriks

1. Bernardino Herrera (GK)
2. Santi Freixa
4. Marc Garcia-Cascon
5. Francisco "Kiko" Fábregas (c)
6. Miquel Codina
7. Juan Escarré
8. Alex Fábregas
9. Pol Amat
10. Eduardo Tubau
12. Alberto Esteban
13. Ramón Alegre
14. Josep Sánchez
15. Víctor Sojo
16. Xavier Ribas
17. Albert Sala
18. Rodrigo Garza
22. Francisco Cortes (GK)
23. David Alegre

== Results ==
All times are local, CEST (UTC+2).

=== Pools ===
==== Pool A ====
Pos	Team	Pld	W	D	L	GF	GA	GD	Pts	Qualification
1	Netherlands	5	4	1	0	23	6	+17	13	Advance to the semi-finals
2	Spain (H)	5	4	1	0	18	5	+13	13	Advance to the semi-finals
3	Great Britain	5	2	0	3	9	7	+2	6	5th–8th place classification
4	South Africa	5	2	0	3	10	14	−4	6	5th–8th place classification
5	Poland	5	1	1	3	6	21	−15	4	9th–12th place classification
6	Japan	5	0	1	4	9	22	−13	1	9th–12th place classification

Source: FIH
(H) Hosts

2 March 2004
12:00

South Africa	1–5	Netherlands
Smith 1'	Report	Taekema 21'; R. Brouwer 44'; Lomans 50'; Evers 52'; Klaver 61'

Umpires:
David Gentles (AUS)
Edmundo Saladino (ARG)

2 March 2004
14:00

Poland	2–1	Great Britain
T. Choczaj 45'; Dutkiewicz 67'	Report	Hall 62'

Umpires:
Xavier Adell (ESP)
Amarjit Singh (MAS)

2 March 2004
16:00

Spain	6–1	Japan
Amat 22', 34', 67'; Fàbregas 25'; Codina 57'; Ribas 65'	Report	Furusato 32'

Umpires:
Sumesh Putra (CAN)
Satinder Kumar (IND)

3 March 2004
14:00

Japan	4–4	Poland
Katayama 14', 70'; Yamabori 19'; Tobita 61'	Report	A. Mikula 7'; P. Mikula 10', 51'; Z. Juszczak 33'

Umpires:
Philip Schellekens (NED)
Sumesh Putra (CAN)

3 March 2004
16:00

South Africa	1–2	Spain
Evans 6'	Report	Freixa 30'; Ribas 70+'

Umpires:
Christian Bläsch (GER)
Amarjit Singh (MAS)

3 March 2004
18:00

Netherlands	3–0	Great Britain
Taekema 4'; De Nooijer 31'; Van der Weide 64'	Report

Umpires:
Juan Manuel Requena (ESP)
John Wright (RSA)

5 March 2004
14:00

Japan	0–1	Great Britain
	Report	Bertram 35'

Umpires:
Philip Schellekens (NED)
Faiz Mohammad Faizi (PAK)

5 March 2004
16:00

Spain	2–2	Netherlands
Freixa 35+', 52'	Report	Reckers 7'; Meijer 23'

Umpires:
Richard Wolter (GER)
Satinder Kumar (IND)

5 March 2004
18:00

Poland	0–6	South Africa
	Report	Nicol 5', 13', 34', 69'; Denne 26'; Basson 52'

Umpires:
Juan Manuel Requena (ESP)
Pedro Texeira (POR)

7 March 2004
12:00

Great Britain	1–2	Spain
Hall 37'	Report	Ribas 41', 55'

Umpires:
Christian Bläsch (GER)
Pedro Texeira (POR)

7 March 2004
14:00

South Africa	2–1	Japan
Nicol 43', 65'	Report	Yamabori 14'

Umpires:
Richard Wolter (GER)
Edmundo Saladino (ARG)

7 March 2004
16:00

Netherlands	4–0	Poland
Evers 11'; Jazet 26'; De Nooijer 66', 70'	Report

Umpires:
Han Jin-Soo (KOR)
Juan Manuel Requena (ESP)

9 March 2004
12:30

Japan	3–9	Netherlands
Ozawa 5'; Yamabori 50'; Ito 65'	Report	Meijer 1'; R. Brouwer 12', 51', 54'; M. Brouwer 39'; Reckers 45' de Nooijer 55'; Lomas 68', 70+'

Umpires:
Satinder Kumar (IND)
Xavier Adell (ESP)

9 March 2004
14:30

South Africa	0–6	Great Britain
	Report	Hawes 7', 14', 69'; Hall 9'; Pearn 37'; Moodie 70'

Umpires:
David Gentles (AUS)
Han Jin-Soo (KOR)

9 March 2004
16:00

Spain	6–0	Poland
Freixa 22'; Sala 23'; Ribas 28'; Escarré 33', 51'; Amat 63'	Report

Umpires:
Amarjit Singh (MAS)
Faiz Muhammad Faizi (PAK)

==== Pool B ====
Pos	Team	Pld	W	D	L	GF	GA	GD	Pts	Qualification
1	Pakistan	5	4	1	0	15	6	+9	13	Advance to the semi-finals
2	India	5	3	1	1	17	13	+4	10	Advance to the semi-finals
3	New Zealand	5	2	1	2	8	10	−2	7	5th–8th place classification
4	Belgium	5	1	3	1	7	8	−1	6	5th–8th place classification
5	Malaysia	5	1	1	3	7	10	−3	4	9th–12th place classification
6	Canada	5	0	1	4	12	19	−7	1	9th–12th place classification

Source: FIH

2 March 2004
12:30

New Zealand	1–0	Malaysia
Shaw 3'	Report

Umpires:
Faiz Muhammad Faizi (PAK)
John Wright (RSA)

2 March 2004
14:30

Pakistan	4–2	Canada
Abbas 38', 51'; Jawad 40'; Abbasi 58'	Report	Pereira 68'; Wettlaufer 70'

Umpires:
Hamish Jamson (ENG)
Han Jin-Soo (KOR)

2 March 2004
18:00

India	1–1	Belgium
Aiyappa 61'	Report	Vandeweghe 64'

Umpires:
Christian Bläsch (GER)
Pedro Texeira (POR)

4 March 2004
14:00

Belgium	0–2	Pakistan
	Report	Jawad 50'; Saqlain 61'

Umpires:
Hamish Jamson (ENG)
Xavier Adell (ESP)

4 March 2004
16:00

Malaysia	3–5	India
Chua 10'; Kuhan 13'; A. Rahim 60'	Report	Thakur 16'; GA Singh 27', 46'; D. Tirkey 29'; Dhillon 63'

Umpires:
David Gentles (AUS)
Edmundo Saladino (ARG)

4 March 2004
18:00

Canada	2–4	New Zealand
R. Short 59'; Kahlon 63'	Report	Smith 12', 37'; Burrows 18', 47'

Umpires:
Richard Wolter (GER)
Han Jin-Soo (KOR)

6 March 2004
12:00

New Zealand	2–2	Belgium
Shaw 16'; Burrows 25'	Report	Houssein 18', 69'

Umpires:
Sumesh Putra (CAN)
Xavier Adell (ESP)

6 March 2004
14:00

Canada	2–3	Malaysia
Fernandes 4', 55'	Report	Madzli 21'; Chua 27'; A. Rahim 68'

Umpires:
Hamish Jamson (ENG)
David Gentles (AUS)

6 March 2004
16:00

Pakistan	5–3	India
Abbas 2', 28', 41', 62'; Butt 34'	Report	Thakur 33'; GA Singh 42', 44'

Umpires:
John Wright (RSA)
Amarjit Singh (MAS)

8 March 2004
12:00

Belgium	2–2	Canada
Brulé 24'; Dewever 49'	Report	Campbell 30'; R. Short 32'

Umpires:
John Wright (RSA)
Satinder Kumar (IND)

8 March 2004
14:00

India	2–0	New Zealand
Halappa 2'; Thakur 67'	Report

Umpires:
Hamish Jamson (ENG)
Sumesh Putra (CAN)

8 March 2004
16:00

Malaysia	0–0	Pakistan
	Report

Umpires:
Xavier Adell (ESP)
Christian Bläsch (GER)

9 March 2004
12:00

Canada	4–6	India
Campbell 37', 68'; R. Short 55'; Wettlaufer 59'	Report	Thakur 6', 35', 36'; Halappa 8'; D. Tirkey 19'; I. Tirkey 69'

Umpires:
Richard Wolter (GER)
Philip Schellekens (NED)

9 March 2004
14:00

Belgium	2–1	Malaysia
Dewever 14'; Brulé 49'	Report	Kuhan 31'

Umpires:
Hamish Jamson (ENG)
Sumesh Putra (CAN)

9 March 2004
18:00

New Zealand	1–4	Pakistan
Shaw 21'	Report	Abbas 25', 35'; Khan 41'; Muhammad 43'

Umpires:
Pedro Texeira (POR)
John Wright (RSA)

=== Ninth to twelfth place classification ===
Crossovers
11 March
Poland	2
Canada	1
11 March
Malaysia	3
Japan	2

Ninth place
12 March
Poland	4
Malaysia	2
Eleventh place
12 March
Canada	3
Japan	2

==== Cross-overs ====
11 March 2004
12:30

Poland	2–1	Canada
Z. Juszczak 22', 37'	Report	Fernandes 46'

Umpires:
Edmundo Saladino (ARG)
Amarjit Singh (MAS)

11 March 2004
15:00

Malaysia	3–2	Japan
Gobinathan 13'; Kuhan 42'; Azlan 49'	Report	Yamabori 28'; Ozawa 38'

Umpires:
Juan Manuel Requena (ESP)
Han Jin-Soo (KOR)

==== Eleventh and twelfth place ====
12 March 2004
12:00

Canada	3–2	Japan
Grimes 8'; Kahlon 29'; Pereira 40'	Report	Furusato 42'; Tobita 70'

Umpires:
Mohammed Faizi (PAK)
Amarjit Singh (MAS)

==== Ninth and tenth place ====
12 March 2004
14:30

Poland	4–2	Malaysia
T. Choczaj 20'; Rachwalski 41'; S. Choczaj 50'; Kmiec 60'	Report	Chua Boon Huat 29'; Mohamad 39'

Umpires:
Han Jin-Soo (KOR)
Pedro Texeira (POR)

=== Fifth to eighth place classification ===
Cross-overs
11 March
Great Britain	2
Belgium	1
11 March
New Zealand	3
South Africa	2

Fifth place
12 March
Great Britain	3
New Zealand	2
Seventh place
13 March
Belgium	2 (3)
South Africa (p.s.o.)	2 (4)

==== Cross-overs ====
11 March 2004
11:30

Great Britain	2–1	Belgium
Middleton 7'; Bertram 8'	Report	Coudron 33'

Umpires:
Xavier Adell (ESP)
Sumesh Putra (CAN)

11 March 2004
14:00

New Zealand	3–2	South Africa
Shaw 16', 40'; Brooks 41'	Report	Nicol 6', 32'

Umpires:
David Gentles (AUS)
Christian Bläsch (GER)

==== Fifth and sixth place ====
12 March 2004
17:00

Great Britain	3–2	New Zealand
Hawes 27'; Dunlop 43'; Garcia 46'	Report	Kosoof 49'; Archibald 62'

Umpires:
Philip Schellekens (NED)
Edmundo Saladino (ARG)

==== Seventh and eighth place ====
13 March 2004
12:00

Belgium	2–2 (a.e.t.)	South Africa
Vandeweghe 2'; Brulé 9'	Report	Evans 14'; Clark 70'
Penalties
Brulé (penalty shoot-out scored); Coudron (penalty shoot-out scored); Luyckx (penalty shoot-out missed); Petre (penalty shoot-out scored); Reckinger (penalty shoot-out missed); Brulé (penalty shoot-out missed)	3–4	(penalty shoot-out scored) Nicol; (penalty shoot-out scored) Symons; (penalty shoot-out missed) Denne; (penalty shoot-out missed) Evans; (penalty shoot-out scored) Fulton; (penalty shoot-out scored) Symons

Umpires:
Sumesh Putra (CAN)
Christian Bläsch (GER)

=== First to fourth place classification ===
Semi-finals
11 March
Netherlands	4
India	2
11 March
Pakistan	2
Spain	3

Final
13 March
Netherlands (a.e.t.)	2
Spain	1
Third place
13 March
India	2
Pakistan	4

==== Semi-finals ====
11 March 2004
16:30

Netherlands	4–2	India
Taekema 13', 34'; M. Brouwer 47', 65'	Report	GA Singh 30'; Thakur 42'

Umpires:
John Wright (RSA)
Richard Wolter (GER)

11 March 2004
19:00

Pakistan	2–3	Spain
Abbasi 30'; Khan 67'	Report	Tubau 14', 39'; Freixa 68'

Umpires:
Hamish Jamson (GBR)
Satinder Kumar (IND)

==== Third and fourth place ====
13 March 2004
14:30

India	2–4	Pakistan
P. Singh 22'; GA Singh 59'	Report	Muhammad 15'; Abbas 43'; Abbasi 55'; Jawad 69'

Umpires:
Hamish Jamson (GBR)
Xavier Adell (ESP)

==== Final ====
13 March 2004
17:00

Netherlands	2–1 (a.e.t.)	Spain
De Nooijer 44'; R. Brouwer 71'	Report	Freixa 31'

Umpires:
John Wright (RSA)
Satinder Kumar (IND)

== Statistics ==
=== Final standings ===
Rank	Team
1st place, gold medalist(s)	Netherlands
2nd place, silver medalist(s)	Spain
3rd place, bronze medalist(s)	Pakistan
4	India
5	Great Britain
6	New Zealand
7	South Africa
8	Belgium
9	Poland
10	Malaysia
11	Canada
12	Japan

Qualified for the 2004 Summer Olympics

=== Awards ===
Topscorer	Best Player	Best Young Player	Best Goalkeeper
(Pakistan) Sohail Abbas	(Spain) Francisco Fábregas	(Netherlands) Floris Evers	(United Kingdom) Simon Mason

== See also ==
- 2004 Women's Field Hockey Olympic Qualifier
