= Hockey at the 2002 Commonwealth Games – Men's tournament =

2002 Commonwealth Games – Men's hockey
Tournament details
- Host country: England
- City: Manchester
- Dates: 27 July – 4 August
- Teams: 8
- Venue: Belle Vue Hockey Centre

Final positions
- Champions: Australia (2nd title)
- Runner-up: New Zealand
- Third place: Pakistan

Tournament statistics
- Matches played: 20
- Goals scored: 135 (6.75 per match)
- Top scorer: (New Zealand) Hayden Shaw (13 goals)

The second edition of the Men's Hockey Tournament at the Commonwealth Games took place during the 2002 Commonwealth Games at the Belle Vue Hockey Centre in Manchester, England. The event started on Saturday July 27 and ended on Sunday August 4, 2002.

== Participating nations ==
| Pool 1 | Pool 2 |
|---|---|
| Australia; Barbados; New Zealand; South Africa | Canada; England; Pakistan; Wales |

== Results ==
=== Preliminary round ===
==== Pool A ====
| Pos | Team | Pld | W | D | L | GF | GA | GD | Pts | Qualification |
|---|---|---|---|---|---|---|---|---|---|---|
| 1 | Australia | 3 | 3 | 0 | 0 | 30 | 3 | +27 | 9 | Semi-finals |
| 2 | New Zealand | 3 | 2 | 0 | 1 | 19 | 8 | +11 | 6 | Quarter-finals |
| 3 | South Africa | 3 | 1 | 0 | 2 | 13 | 10 | +3 | 3 | Quarter-finals |
| 4 | Barbados | 3 | 0 | 0 | 3 | 2 | 43 | −41 | 0 | |

Source: Planet Field Hockey
Rules for classification: 1) points; 2) goal difference; 3) goals scored; 4) head-to-head result.

27 July 2002
09:00

| Australia | 6–1 | New Zealand |
|---|---|---|
| Smith 21'; Victory 33', 62'; Elder 47', 59'; Livermore 66' | Report | Shaw 20' |

Stadium:
Belle Vue Hockey Stadium

27 July 2002
11:00

| South Africa | 10–1 | Barbados |
|---|---|---|
| King 3'; E. Smith 8'; Cullen 19', 50'; Nicol 20', 34', 62'; Fulton 25'; Abrahams 41'; Jackson 66' | Report | Murray 42' |

Stadium:
Belle Vue Hockey Stadium

28 July 2002
13:00

| South Africa | 1–4 | Australia |
|---|---|---|
| King 63' | Report | Smith 21'; Dwyer 41'; Victory 43'; Taylor 45' |

Stadium:
Belle Vue Hockey Stadium

28 July 2002
15:00

| New Zealand | 13–0 | Barbados |
|---|---|---|
| Shaw 5', 13', 35+'; Archibald 13', 37', 39', 40'; Smith 20'; Burrows 28'; Parag 33'; Patel 43'; Kosoof 51'; McIndoe 62' | Report |

Stadium:
Belle Vue Hockey Stadium

30 July 2002
16:00

| Australia | 20–1 | Barbados |
|---|---|---|
| Taylor 2'; Victory 14', 42', 52', 65'; McCann 17', 34', 37', 38'; Webster 21'; Elder 25', 27', 60'; Dwyer 26', 32', 65'; Smith 44', 68'; Hopkins 49'; Livermore 60' | Report | Bailey 51' |

Stadium:
Belle Vue Hockey Stadium

30 July 2002
18:00

| New Zealand | 5–2 | South Africa |
|---|---|---|
| Shaw 15', 42', 54', 67'; Towns 24' | Report | Nicol 35'; E. Smith 60' |

Stadium:
Belle Vue Hockey Stadium

==== Pool B ====
| Pos | Team | Pld | W | D | L | GF | GA | GD | Pts | Qualification |
|---|---|---|---|---|---|---|---|---|---|---|
| 1 | Pakistan | 3 | 3 | 0 | 0 | 8 | 0 | +8 | 9 | Semi-finals |
| 2 | England | 3 | 2 | 0 | 1 | 7 | 4 | +3 | 6 | Quarter-finals |
| 3 | Canada | 3 | 0 | 1 | 2 | 2 | 5 | −3 | 1 | Quarter-finals |
| 4 | Wales | 3 | 0 | 1 | 2 | 1 | 9 | −8 | 1 | |

Source: Planet Field Hockey
Rules for classification: 1) points; 2) goal difference; 3) goals scored; 4) head-to-head result.

27 July 2002
13:00

| Canada | 1–1 | Wales |
|---|---|---|
| Fernandes 58' | Report | Organ 50' |

Stadium:
Belle Vue Hockey Stadium

27 July 2002
15:30

| England | 0–3 | Pakistan |
|---|---|---|
| | Report | Abbas 16', 20', 38' |

Stadium:
Belle Vue Hockey Stadium

28 July 2002
17:30

| Canada | 1–2 | England |
|---|---|---|
| Short 46' | Report | Wyatt 42'; Mathews 68' |

Stadium:
Belle Vue Hockey Stadium

28 July 2002
19:30

| Pakistan | 3–0 | Wales |
|---|---|---|
| Ashraf 12', 41'; Nadeem 37' | Report |

Stadium:
Belle Vue Hockey Stadium

30 July 2002
11:00

| Pakistan | 2–0 | Canada |
|---|---|---|
| Saqlain 21'; Abbas 62' | Report |

Stadium:
Belle Vue Hockey Stadium

30 July 2002
13:00

| England | 5–0 | Wales |
|---|---|---|
| Mathews 9'; Pearn 17'; Parnham 43', 49'; Wyatt 69' | Report |

Stadium:
Belle Vue Hockey Stadium

=== Classification round ===
==== Seventh and eighth place ====
2 August 2002
10:00

| Barbados | 0–7 | Wales |
|---|---|---|
| | Report | Organ 6', 29', 58'; Hoskin 38'; Westerman 38', 42'; Edwards 70' |

Stadium:
Belle Vue Hockey Stadium

==== First to sixth place classification ====
Crossovers
31 July 2002
England | 0
South Africa | 1
31 July 2002
New Zealand | 3
Canada | 2

Semi-finals
2 August 2002
Australia | 3
South Africa | 1
2 August 2002
Pakistan | 1
New Zealand | 7

Final
4 August 2002
Australia | 5
New Zealand | 2
Third Place
4 August 2002
Pakistan | 10
South Africa | 2

===== Quarter-finals =====
31 July 2002
16:00

| England | 0–1 | South Africa |
|---|---|---|
| | Report | E. Smith 29' |

Stadium:
Belle Vue Hockey Stadium

31 July 2002
18:30

| New Zealand | 3–2 | Canada |
|---|---|---|
| Shaw 12', 39', 65' | Report | Fernandes 6'; Kahlon 30' |

Stadium:
Belle Vue Hockey Stadium

===== Fifth and sixth place =====
2 August 2002
12:30

| England | 6–3 | Canada |
|---|---|---|
| Hall 10', 25', 62', 64'; Waugh 54'; Pearn 61' | Report | Pereira 2', 46'; Fernandes 59' |

Stadium:
Belle Vue Hockey Stadium

===== Semi-finals =====
2 August 2002
16:00

| Pakistan | 1–7 | New Zealand |
|---|---|---|
| Nadeem 44' | Report | Parag 1'; Hari 3'; Hopping 21'; Burrows 46', 63', 68'; Shaw 60' |

Stadium:
Belle Vue Hockey Stadium

2 August 2002
18:30

| Australia | 3–1 | South Africa |
|---|---|---|
| Smith 12'; George 46'; McCann 68' | Report | King 31' |

Stadium:
Belle Vue Hockey Stadium

===== Third and fourth place =====
4 August 2002
13:00

| Pakistan | 10–2 | South Africa |
|---|---|---|
| Abbas 11', 33', 34', 42', 48'; Nadeem 14'; Khan 53'; Jawad 59'; Ali 60'; Shabbir 68' | Report | Clark 25'; E. Smith 28' |

Stadium:
Belle Vue Hockey Stadium

===== Final =====
4 August 2002
15:30

| Australia | 5–2 | New Zealand |
|---|---|---|
| Elder 20'; Dwyer 25', 32', 50'; Victory 27' | Report | Burrows 44'; Shaw 57' |

Stadium:
Belle Vue Hockey Stadium

== Statistics ==
=== Final standings ===
| Pos | Team | Pld | W | D | L | GF | GA | GD | Pts | Final result |
|---|---|---|---|---|---|---|---|---|---|---|
| 1st place, gold medalist(s) | Australia | 5 | 5 | 0 | 0 | 38 | 6 | +32 | 15 | Gold Medal |
| 2nd place, silver medalist(s) | New Zealand | 6 | 4 | 0 | 2 | 31 | 16 | +15 | 12 | Silver Medal |
| 3rd place, bronze medalist(s) | Pakistan | 5 | 4 | 0 | 1 | 19 | 9 | +10 | 12 | Bronze Medal |
| 4 | South Africa | 6 | 2 | 0 | 4 | 17 | 23 | −6 | 6 | Fourth place |
| 5 | England | 5 | 3 | 0 | 2 | 13 | 8 | +5 | 9 | Eliminated in crossovers |
| 6 | Canada | 5 | 0 | 1 | 4 | 7 | 14 | −7 | 1 | Eliminated in crossovers |
| 7 | Wales | 4 | 1 | 1 | 2 | 8 | 9 | −1 | 4 | Eliminated in group stage |
| 8 | Barbados | 4 | 0 | 0 | 4 | 2 | 50 | −48 | 0 | Eliminated in group stage |

Source: Planet Field Hockey

=== Goalscorers ===
There were 135 goals scored in 20 matches, for an average of 6.75 goals per match.

13 goals

- (New Zealand) Hayden Shaw

9 goals

- (Pakistan) Sohail Abbas

8 goals

- (Australia) Craig Victory

7 goals

- (Australia) Jamie Dwyer

6 goals

- (Australia) Troy Elder

5 goals

- (Australia) Michael McCann
- (Australia) Matthew Smith
- (New Zealand) Phil Burrows

4 goals

- (England) Daniel Hall
- (New Zealand) Ryan Archibald
- (South Africa) Gregory Nicol
- (South Africa) Emile Smith
- (Wales) Simon Organ

3 goals

- (Canada) Wayne Fernandes
- (Pakistan) Muhammad Nadeem
- (South Africa) Justin King

2 goals

- (Australia) Brent Livermore
- (Australia) Benjamin Taylor
- (Canada) Kenneth Pereira
- (England) David Mathews
- (England) Craig Parnham
- (England) Mark Pearn
- (England) Jonathan Wyatt
- (New Zealand) Umesh Parag
- (Pakistan) Kamran Ashraf
- (South Africa) Michael Cullen
- (Wales) James Westerman

1 goal

- (Australia) Bevan George
- (Australia) Aaron Hopkins
- (Australia) Scott Webster
- (Barbados) Roger Bailey
- (Barbados) Mark Murray
- (Canada) Ravi Kahlon
- (Canada) Robert Short
- (England) William Waugh
- (New Zealand) Bevan Hari
- (New Zealand) Blair Hopping
- (New Zealand) David Kosoof
- (New Zealand) Wayne McIndoe
- (New Zealand) Mitesh Patel
- (New Zealand) Darren Smith
- (New Zealand) Simon Towns
- (Pakistan) Ghazanfar Ali
- (Pakistan) Kashif Jawad
- (Pakistan) Mudassar Ali Khan
- (Pakistan) Muhammad Saqlain
- (Pakistan) Muhammad Shabbir
- (South Africa) Clyde Abrahams
- (South Africa) Gregg Clark
- (South Africa) Craig Fulton
- (South Africa) Craig Jackson
- (Wales) Paul Edwards
- (Wales) Mark Hoskin

== Awards ==
2002 Men's Hockey Commonwealth Games winners

Australia
Second title

Top Goalscorer
(New Zealand) Shaw
