= Andrew Buckley =

Andrew Buckley may refer to:

- Andy Buckley (born 1965), American actor, screenwriter and stockbroker
- Andrew Buckley (British actor)
- Andy Buckley (hurler) (1884–?), Irish hurler
- Andrew Buckley (Canadian football) (born 1993), Canadian football quarterback
- Andrew Buckley (field hockey) (born 1973), field hockey player from New Zealand
