= England men's national field hockey team =

England
- Association: England Hockey
- Head Coach: Zak Jones
- Assistant coach(es): David Ames; Mark Hickman; Robert van der Horst
- Manager: Paul Gannon
- Captain: Zachary Wallace
- Most caps: Barry Middleton (432)
- Top scorer: Ashley Jackson (137)
Home	Away

FIH ranking
- Current: 3 (5 August 2026)

Olympic Games
- Appearances: 1 (first in 1908)
- Best result: (gold) 1st (1908)

World Cup
- Appearances: 15 (first in 1973)
- Best result: (silver) 2nd (1986)

EuroHockey Championships
- Appearances: 20 (first in 1970)
- Best result: (gold) 1st (2009)
Medal record
Event	1st	2nd	3rd
Olympic Games	1	0	0
World Cup	0	1	0
EuroHockey Championship	1	2	7
Commonwealth Games	0	0	4
Champions Trophy	0	1	0
World League	0	0	1
Pro League	0	1	0
Total	2	5	12
Olympic Games
Gold medal – first place	1908 London	Team
World Cup
Silver medal – second place	1986 London	
EuroHockey Championship
Gold medal – first place	2009 Amstelveen	
Silver medal – second place	1987 Moscow	
Silver medal – second place	2023 Mönchengladbach	
Bronze medal – third place	1978 Hannover	
Bronze medal – third place	1991 Paris	
Bronze medal – third place	1995 Dublin	
Bronze medal – third place	1999 Padua	
Bronze medal – third place	2003 Barcelona	
Bronze medal – third place	2011 Mönchengladbach	
Bronze medal – third place	2017 Amstelveen	
Commonwealth Games
Bronze medal – third place	1998 Kuala Lumpur	Team
Bronze medal – third place	2014 Glasgow	Team
Bronze medal – third place	2018 Gold Coast	Team
Bronze medal – third place	2022 Birmingham	Team
Champions Trophy
Silver medal – second place	2010 Mönchengladbach	
World League
Bronze medal – third place	2012–13 New Delhi	Team

The England men's national field hockey team competes in most major international tournaments except the Olympic Games. England's only appearance at the Olympics was at London 1908 when they won gold; since then English players have competed at the Olympics as part of the combined Great Britain national field hockey team.

England's best finish in the Hockey World Cup was as runners-up to champions Australia in 1986, which was also held in London. They won the bronze medal at the inaugural Commonwealth Games hockey tournament in 1998 in Kuala Lumpur, as well as in 2014 in Glasgow and in Birmingham in 2022.

== Competitive record ==
=== Summer Olympics ===
Summer Olympics record
Year	Round	Position	Pld	W	D	L	GF	GA	Squad
(United Kingdom) 1908	Final	1st	3	3	0	0	24	3	Squad
(Belgium) 1920 until now	Part of Great Britain								
Total	1 title	1/1	3	3	0	0	24	3	–

=== World Cup ===
FIH World Cup record
Year	Round	Position	Pld	W	D *	L	GF	GA	Squad
(Spain) 1971	did not participate								
(Netherlands) 1973	5th place game	6th	7	2	2	3	10	11	N/A
(Malaysia) 1975	5th place game	6th	7	3	1	3	19	17	N/A
(Argentina) 1978	7th place game	7th	8	2	3	3	11	10	N/A
(India) 1982	9th place game	9th	7	3	1	3	10	15	N/A
(England) 1986	Final	2nd	7	5	0	2	13	8	N/A
(Pakistan) 1990	5th place game	5th	7	4	1	2	12	7	N/A
(Australia) 1994	5th place game	6th	7	3	2	2	7	5	N/A
(Netherlands) 1998	5th place game	6th	7	3	0	4	18	21	Squad
(Malaysia) 2002	7th place game	7th	9	5	0	4	19	11	Squad
(Germany) 2006	5th place game	5th	7	4	0	3	15	13	Squad
(India) 2010	3rd place game	4th	7	4	0	3	21	20	Squad
(Netherlands) 2014	3rd place game	4th	7	3	1	3	8	12	Squad
(India) 2018	3rd place game	4th	7	3	1	3	12	23	Squad
(India) 2023	Quarter-finals	5th	4	2	2	0	11	2	Squad
(Belgium) (Netherlands) 2026	Main round	6th	6	3	1	2	19	12	Squad
Total	Best: 2nd	15/16	104	49	15	40	205	187	–

=== European Championships ===
EuroHockey Championship record
Year	Round	Position	Pld	W	D *	L	GF	GA
(Belgium) 1970	5th place game	6th	7	4	0	3	10	7
(Spain) 1974	3rd place game	4th	7	5	0	2	12	10
(West Germany) 1978	3rd place game	3rd	7	5	1	1	19	7
(Netherlands) 1983	5th place game	5th	7	3	2	2	20	10
(Soviet Union) 1987	Final	2nd	7	6	1	0	24	2
(France) 1991	3rd place game	3rd	7	4	1	2	14	8
(Republic of Ireland) 1995	3rd place game	3rd	7	4	2	1	18	11
(Italy) 1999	3rd place game	3rd	7	5	1	1	27	11
(Spain) 2003	3rd place game	3rd	7	3	2	2	16	15
(Germany) 2005	5th place game	6th	5	1	2	2	8	8
(England) 2007	Relegation pool	5th	5	2	2	1	17	6
(Netherlands) 2009	Champions	1st	5	4	1	0	24	10
(Germany) 2011	3rd place game	3rd	5	3	0	2	17	11
(Belgium) 2013	3rd place game	4th	5	1	1	3	10	12
(England) 2015	3rd place game	4th	5	2	1	2	18	9
(Netherlands) 2017	3rd place game	3rd	5	3	0	2	16	10
(Belgium) 2019	Relegation pool	5th	5	2	2	1	9	7
(Netherlands) 2021	3rd place game	4th	5	3	0	2	17	9
(Germany) 2023	Final	2nd	5	2	1	2	11	9
(Germany) 2025	Relegation pool	6th	5	2	1	2	16	6
(England) 2027	Qualified							
Total	1 title	21/21	118	64	21	33	320	179

=== Commonwealth Games ===
Commonwealth Games record
Year	Host	Position	Pld	W	D	L	GF	GA	Squad
1998	Kuala Lumpur, Malaysia	3rd	6	2	3	1	12	10	Squad
2002	Manchester, England	5th	5	3	0	2	13	8	Squad
2006	Melbourne, Australia	4th	6	3	0	3	14	14	Squad
2010	Delhi, India	4th	6	3	3	0	18	11	Squad
2014	Glasgow, Scotland	3rd	6	3	1	2	22	12	Squad
2018	Gold Coast, Australia	3rd	6	3	1	2	18	11	Squad
2022	Birmingham, England	3rd	6	4	1	1	33	14	Squad
Total		7/7	41	21	9	11	130	80	

=== FIH Pro League ===
FIH Pro League record
Season	Position	Pld	W	D *	L	GF	GA	Squad
2021–22	6th	16	7	2	7	40	41	Squad
2024–25	7th	16	5	5	6	41	36	Squad
2025–26	2nd	16	8	6	2	44	25	Squad
Total	Best: 2nd	48	20	13	15	135	103	

=== Defunct competitions ===
==== Champions Trophy ====
Champions Trophy record
Year	Position	Pld	W	D *	L	GF	GA
(Pakistan) 1978	Participated as part of Great Britain						
(Pakistan) 1980	Participated as part of Great Britain						
(Pakistan) 1981	6th	5	0	2	3	10	15
(Netherlands) 1982 until (Pakistan) 1994	did not participate or participated as part of Great Britain						
(Germany) 1995	6th	6	0	3	3	5	9
(India) 1996	did not participate						
(Australia) 1997	did not participate						
(Pakistan) 1998	did not participate						
(Australia) 1999	5th	6	2	0	4	9	16
(Netherlands) 2000	Participated as part of Great Britain						
(Netherlands) 2001	5th	6	1	1	4	14	20
(Germany) 2002 until (Netherlands) 2008	did not participate or participated as part of Great Britain						
(Australia) 2009	6th	6	1	1	4	13	18
(Germany) 2010	2nd	6	2	1	3	15	20
(New Zealand) 2011	Participated as part of Great Britain						
(Australia) 2012	8th	6	1	1	4	8	14
(India) 2014	7th	6	3	1	2	16	10
(United Kingdom) 2016	Participated as part of Great Britain						
(Netherlands) 2018	did not participate						
Total	Best: 2nd	47	10	10	27	90	122

==== Champions Challenge I ====
Champions Challenge I record
Year	Position	Pld	W	D	L	GF	GA
(Malaysia) 2001	did not participate						
(South Africa) 2003	5th	6	2	0	4	9	18
(Egypt) 2005	4th	6	2	1	3	18	19
(Belgium) 2007	4th	6	2	0	4	19	19
(Argentina) 2009 until (Malaysia) 2014	did not participate						
Total	Best: 4th	18	6	1	11	46	56

==== World League ====
FIH Hockey World League record
Season	Position	Round	Pld	W	D *	L	GF	GA
2012–13	3rd	Semi-final	6	3	2	1	15	10
2012–13	3rd	Final	6	5	1	0	15	6
2014–15	Participated as Great Britain							
2016–17	8th	Semi-final	7	5	1	1	27	13
2016–17	8th	Final	5	1	1	3	7	10
Total	Best: 3rd	Final	24	14	5	5	64	39

*Draws include matches decided on a penalty shoot-out.

== Players ==
=== Current squad ===
Roster for the 2026 Men's FIH Hockey World Cup.

Head coach: Zak Jones

2. Nick Park
3. Jack Waller
5. Tom Sorsby
7. Zachary Wallace (C)
9. Henry Croft
13. Sam Ward
14. James Albery
15. Phil Roper
16. James Mazarelo (GK)
17. Stuart Rushmere
18. Timothy Nurse
19. David Goodfield
20. Ollie Payne (GK)
23. Nick Bandurak
26. James Gall
27. Liam Sanford
30. Conor Williamson
31. Will Calnan
33. Sam Hooper
47. Ben Fox

== Results and fixtures ==
The following is a list of match results in the last 12 months, as well as any future matches that have been scheduled.

Win Draw Loss Fixture

=== 2026 ===
6 February 2026 2025–26 Men's FIH Pro League	England	2–2 (3–1 p)	Netherlands	Valencia, Spain
11:00	Wallace 8'; Hooper 10'	Report	Reyenga 22'; Bukkens 57'	Stadium: Estadio Beteró
	Penalties
	Calnan (penalty shoot-out scored); Rushmere (penalty shoot-out scored); Albery (penalty shoot-out missed); Wallace (penalty shoot-out scored)		(penalty shoot-out missed) Bukkens; (penalty shoot-out scored) Croon; (penalty shoot-out missed) Brinkman; (penalty shoot-out missed) van Dam

7 February 2026 2025–26 Men's FIH Pro League	Spain	1–3	England	Valencia, Spain
11:00	M. Miralles 18'	Report	Waller 3'; Bandurak 24'; Ward 53'	Stadium: Estadio Beteró

9 February 2026 2025–26 Men's FIH Pro League	Netherlands	2–2 (3–4 p)	England	Valencia, Spain
11:00	Jansen 23'; De Geus 34'	Report	Croft 28', 60'	Stadium: Estadio Beteró
	Penalties
	Reyenga (penalty shoot-out scored); Telgenkamp (penalty shoot-out missed); De Mol (penalty shoot-out missed); Middendorp (penalty shoot-out missed); Reyenga (penalty shoot-out scored); Van Dam (penalty shoot-out scored); Van Dam (penalty shoot-out missed)		(penalty shoot-out missed) Calnan; (penalty shoot-out missed) Rushmere; (penalty shoot-out scored) Albery; (penalty shoot-out missed) Wallace; (penalty shoot-out scored) Wallace; (penalty shoot-out scored) Payton; (penalty shoot-out scored) Albery

10 February 2026 2025–26 Men's FIH Pro League	Spain	2–4	England	Valencia, Spain
09:00	Basterra 28', 38'	Report	Payton 4'; Ward 26', 59'; Rushmere 42'	Stadium: Estadio Beteró

1 March 2026 WC Qualifiers GS	England	5–0	Japan	Ismailia, Egypt
18:45	Sorsby 11', 36'; Ward 13'; Croft 17', 44'	Report		Stadium: Suez Canal Stadium

2 March 2026 WC Qualifiers GS	Egypt	0–3	England	Ismailia, Egypt
20:45		Report	Ward 27'; Bandurak 29'; Sorsby 57'	Stadium: Suez Canal Stadium

4 March 2026 WC Qualifiers GS	England	5–0 (Note: The United States withdrew after two matches because of an official advisory from the US State Department due to the 2026 Iran war.)	United States	Ismailia, Egypt
18:45		Report		Stadium: Suez Canal Stadium

6 March 2026 WC Qualifiers SF	England	7–1	Malaysia	Ismailia, Egypt
13:15	Ward 19'; Hooper 36', 60'; Sorsby 42'; Rushmere 43', 49'; Wallace 54'	Report	Hassan 50'	Stadium: Suez Canal Stadium

7 March 2026 WC Qualifiers Final	England	4–1	Pakistan	Ismailia, Egypt
20:00	Croft 18'; Hooper 35', 40'; Fox 52'	Report	Wal. Rana 42'	Stadium: Suez Canal Stadium

13 June 2026 2025–26 Men's FIH Pro League	England	5–0	Argentina	London, England
12:30	Croft 18', 51'; Ward 41'; Bandurak 47'; Sorsby 58'	Report		Stadium: Lee Valley Hockey and Tennis Centre

14 June 2026 2025–26 Men's FIH Pro League	England	4–3	Australia	London, England
12:30	Calnan 40'; Goodfield 42'; Sorsby 48'; Hooper 55'	Report	Ephraums 13', 57'; Willott 58'	Stadium: Lee Valley Hockey and Tennis Centre

20 June 2026 2025–26 Men's FIH Pro League	England	1–1 (3–1 p)	Argentina	London, England
12:30	Bandurak 45'	Report	Domene 50'	Stadium: Lee Valley Hockey and Tennis Centre
	Penalties
	Calnan (penalty shoot-out scored); Albery (penalty shoot-out scored); Rushmere (penalty shoot-out scored)		(penalty shoot-out scored) Mendez; (penalty shoot-out missed) Domene; (penalty shoot-out missed) Toscani; (penalty shoot-out missed) Martins

21 June 2026 2025–26 Men's FIH Pro League	England	3–1	Australia	London, England
11:30	Bandurak 40', 47'; Gall 56'	Report	Geddes 41'	Stadium: Lee Valley Hockey and Tennis Centre

24 June 2026 2025–26 Men's FIH Pro League	England	2–1	Pakistan	London, England
13:30	Roper 40'; Hooper 46'	Report	Rana 27'	Stadium: Lee Valley Hockey and Tennis Centre

25 June 2026 2025–26 Men's FIH Pro League	England	2–2 (4–1 p)	India	London, England
19:30	Goodfield 29'; Bandurak 56'	Report	Dilpreet 10', 58'	Stadium: Lee Valley Hockey and Tennis Centre
	Penalties
	Sorsby (penalty shoot-out scored); Albery (penalty shoot-out scored); Wallace (penalty shoot-out scored); Wallace (penalty shoot-out scored)		(penalty shoot-out scored) Harmanpreet; (penalty shoot-out missed) Sukhjeet; (penalty shoot-out missed) Vivek

27 June 2026 2025–26 Men's FIH Pro League	England	7–0	Pakistan	London, England
16:00	Ward 9'; Bandurak 15', 48'; Taylor 22'; Hooper 38'; Wallace 49'; Croft 52'	Report		Stadium: Lee Valley Hockey and Tennis Centre

28 June 2026 2025–26 Men's FIH Pro League	England	0–0 (2–3 p)	India	London, England
16:00		Report		Stadium: Lee Valley Hockey and Tennis Centre
	Penalties
	Wallace (penalty shoot-out scored); Sorsby (penalty shoot-out missed); Croft (penalty shoot-out missed); Goodfield (penalty shoot-out scored); Waller (penalty shoot-out missed)		(penalty shoot-out missed) Sukhjeet; (penalty shoot-out scored) Abhishek; (penalty shoot-out scored) Lakra; (penalty shoot-out scored) Hardik; (penalty shoot-out missed) Dilpreet

15 August 2026 World Cup Pool D	England	4–1	Pakistan	Amstelveen, Netherlands
18:00	Rushmere 12'; Ward 28'; Hooper 31'; Albery 47'	Report	Afraz 50'	Stadium: Wagener Stadium

17 August 2026 World Cup Pool D	India	2–4	England	Amstelveen, Netherlands
14:00	Harmanpreet 17'; Dilpreet 25'	Report	Bandurak 14', 55'; Rushmere 39'; Croft 43'	Stadium: Wagener Stadium

19 August 2026 World Cup Pool D	England	8–2	Wales	Amstelveen, Netherlands
11:30	Ward 2'; Calnan 13', 20'; Sorsby 22'; Wallace 41'; Hooper 48'; Croft 51'; Bandurak 54'	Report	G. Furlong 58', 59'	Stadium: Wagener Stadium

22 August 2026 World Cup Pool E	England	1–3	Argentina	Amstelveen, Netherlands
19:00	Hooper 50'	Report	Domene 26', 36', 58'	Stadium: Wagener Stadium

24 August 2026 World Cup Pool E	Netherlands	2–2	England	Amstelveen, Netherlands
18:00	Janssen 30'; Brinkman 32'	Report	Rushmere 6'; Croft 48'	Stadium: Wagener Stadium

28 August 2026 World Cup 5th place match	England	0–2	Australia	Amstelveen, Netherlands
15:00		Report	Govers 30'; Willott 48'	Stadium: Wagener Stadium

== See also ==
- England women's national field hockey team
- Great Britain men's national field hockey team
- Great Britain women's national field hockey team
