= Rodolfo Pérez (field hockey) =

Argentine field hockey player

Personal information
- Born: October 21, 1967 (age 58)
Medal record
Men's field hockey
Representing Argentina
Pan American Games
Gold medal – first place	1991 Havana	Team
Gold medal – first place	1995 Mar del Plata	Team
Silver medal – second place	1999 Winnipeg	Team

Rodolfo Adrian Pérez Gentile (born October 21, 1967) is a former field hockey player from Argentina. He twice competed for his native country at the Summer Olympics: in 1992 and 1996. Pérez finished in ninth and eleventh place with the national squad.
