= Scott Williams (field hockey) =

American field hockey player

Scott Carroll Williams (born January 16, 1971, in Costa Mesa, California) is a former field hockey defender. Williams competed for the United States since 1993 and finished twelfth with the national team at the 1996 Summer Olympics in Atlanta. He won four medals in six Olympic Festival appearances, and he played for Ventura Roadrunners/Thousand Oaks (California) Bulldogs.
