= Narcís Ventalló =

Spanish field hockey player (1940–2018)

Medal record

Men's field hockey

Representing Spain

Olympic Games
Bronze medal – third place	1960 Rome	Team competition

Narcís Ventalló (Catalan: Narcís Ventalló i Surrallés, Spanish: Narciso Ventalló Surrallés, 17 October 1940 – 22 December 2018) was a Catalan field hockey player. Throughout his career, he competed for Spain in the 1960 Summer Olympics, the 1964 Summer Olympics, and the 1968 Summer Olympics. He was born in Terrassa, Barcelona.
