= Brad Milne =

South African field hockey player

Medal record

Men's field hockey

Representing South Africa

Africa Cup of Nations
Gold medal – first place	1996 Pretoria	

Brad Milne (born 17 March 1974) is a South African former field hockey player who competed in the 1996 Summer Olympics.
