= Richard Markham (field hockey) =

Richard Markham is a British educator and former field hockey player for Wales.

Markham studied at Oxford University and represented Wales at the 1998 Commonwealth Games. He is also a schoolteacher, and taught history at Marlborough College before being appointed principal of Hockerill Anglo-European College in 2013.

Pippa Middleton, who was a student at Marlborough, described him as "our fierce but undeniably fanciable coach".
