= Alan Brahmst =

Canadian field hockey player

Personal information
- Born: September 27, 1965 (age 60) Hamburg, Germany
Medal record
Men's field hockey
Representing Canada
Pan American Games
Gold medal – first place	1999 Winnipeg	Team
Silver medal – second place	1995 Mar del Plata	Team

Alan Brahmst (born September 27, 1965) is a former international and Olympic field hockey player from Canada.

Brahmst was national coach from 2008 to 2010 and coached at the 2008 Beijing Olympics (assistant) and 2010 World Cup in Delhi (head coach)

Brahmst is a strategy & high performance consultant

== International senior competitions ==
- 1986 – World Cup, London (10th)
- 1991 – Indoor World Cup, Glasgow (4th)
- 1993 – Intercontinental Cup, Poznan (7th)
- 1995 – Pan American Games, Mar del Plata (2nd)
- 1996 – Olympic Qualifier, Barcelona (6th)
- 1996 – World Cup Preliminary, Sardinia (2nd)
- 1997 – World Cup Qualifier, Kuala Lumpur (5th)
- 1998 – World Cup, Utrecht (8th)
- 1999 – Sultan Azlan Shah Cup, Kuala Lumpur (4th)
- 1999 – Pan American Games, Winnipeg (1st)
- 2000 – Sultan Azlan Shah Cup, Kuala Lumpur (7th)
- 2000 – Americas Cup, Cuba (2nd)
- 2000 – Olympic Games, Sydney (10th)
