= David Yule (field hockey) =

Canadian field hockey player

David Yule (born September 4, 1974 in Vancouver, British Columbia) is a former field hockey midfielder from Canada.

== Biography ==
The forward is BA in English Literature and History from University of British Columbia. He co-wrote with Rick Roberts "The Goose is in Malaysia", theme song of the Men's National Team at the 1998 Commonwealth Games. Yule played in the Dutch Premier League (Hoofdklasse) for HGC from Wassenaar.

== International senior competitions ==
- 1998 – Commonwealth Games, Kuala Lumpur (not ranked)
- 1999 – Sultan Azlan Shah Cup, Kuala Lumpur (4th)
