= Ryan Ravenscroft =

South African field hockey player

Personal information
- Born: 31 January 1981 (age 45) Johannesburg, South Africa
Medal record
Men's field hockey

Ryan Ravenscroft (born 31 January 1981) is a South African former field hockey player who competed in the 2004 Summer Olympics.
