= Bart Looije =

Dutch field hockey player

Personal information
- Nationality: Dutch
- Born: 19 December 1968 (age 57) Rotterdam, Netherlands

Sport
- Sport: Field hockey

Bart Looije (born 19 December 1968) is a Dutch field hockey player. He competed in the men's tournament at the 1992 Summer Olympics.
