= Mike Oliver (field hockey) =

Canadian field hockey player

Mike Oliver (born November 27, 1973, in Victoria, British Columbia) is a field hockey player from Canada.

Oliver was selected for the first time in the Men's National Team in 2001 for the World Cup Qualifier in Scotland. The striker, employed as an air traffic controller, scored his first goal in his first cap against Belgium with a few minutes of playing time left (final score: 1-1).

== International senior competitions ==
- 2001 – World Cup Qualifying Tournament, Edinburgh (8th)
- 2002 – Commonwealth Games, Manchester (6th)
- 2003 – Pan American Games, Santo Domingo (2nd)
- 2004 – Olympic Qualifying Tournament, Madrid (11th)
