= Fernando Moresi =

Argentine field hockey player

Personal information
- Born: June 27, 1970
- Died: October 29, 2016 (aged 46)
Medal record
Men's field hockey
Representing Argentina
Pan American Games
Gold medal – first place	1995 Mar del Plata	Team
Silver medal – second place	1999 Winnipeg	Team

Fernando Moresi Vergara (June 27, 1970 – October 29, 2016) was a former field hockey player from Argentina. He competed for his native country at the 1996 Summer Olympics, where he finished in ninth place with the national squad. He twice won a medal at the Pan American Games.
