= Sean Campbell (field hockey) =

Canadian field hockey player (born 1973)

Medal record

Representing Canada

Men's field hockey

Pan American Games
Gold medal – first place	Winnipeg 1999	Team competition

Sean Campbell (born April 11, 1973 in Victoria, British Columbia) is a field hockey player from Canada, who earned his first international cap at the 1999 Sultan Azlan Shah Tournament in Kuala Lumpur, Malaysia.

== International senior competitions ==
- 1999 - Sultan Azlan Shah Cup, Kuala Lumpur (4th)
- 1999 - Pan American Games, Winnipeg (1st)
- 2000 - Sultan Azlan Shah Cup, Kuala Lumpur (7th)
- 2000 - Americas Cup, Cuba (2nd)
- 2000 - Olympic Games, Sydney (10th)
- 2001 - World Cup Qualifier, Edinburgh (8th)
- 2002 - Commonwealth Games, Manchester (6th)
- 2004 - Olympic Qualifying Tournament, Madrid (11th)
- 2004 - Pan Am Cup, London (2nd)
