= Julian Stevenson =

Irish field hockey player

Julian Stevenson is a Lisburn-born former Irish international hockey player. He attended Friends School Lisburn, and later played for Lisnagarvey Hockey Club while attaining many Ireland and Ulster caps. He has coached at Armagh Hockey Club, and currently at Cliftonville.
