= Patrick Burrows =

Canadian field hockey player

Personal information
- Born: November 5, 1959 (age 66) Barrie, Ontario
Medal record
Men's field hockey
Representing Canada
Pan American Games
Gold medal – first place	1983 Caracas	Team
Gold medal – first place	1987 Indianapolis	Team

Patrick Burrows (born November 5, 1959, in Barrie, Ontario) is a former field hockey defender from Canada. He played in the Summer Olympics in 1984 and 1988, and was an assistant coach for Canada's 2000 Olympic team. Burrows was also on Canada's gold medal-winning Pan American Games teams in 1983 and 1987. He works at Castilleja School.
