= Andrew Griffiths (field hockey) =

Canadian field hockey player

Personal information
- Born: January 11, 1969 (age 57) Sheffield, England
Medal record
Men's field hockey
Representing Canada
Pan American Games
Silver medal – second place	1991 Havana	Team
Silver medal – second place	1995 Mar del Plata	Team
Gold medal – first place	1999 Winnipeg	Team

Andrew Griffiths (born January 11, 1969) is a former field hockey forward from Canada. He is currently the head coach of the Old Dominion Monarchs field hockey team.

== International senior competitions ==
- 1989 – World Cup Qualifier, Madison, USA (2nd)
- 1990 – World Cup, Lahore (11th)
- 1991 – Pan American Games, Havana (2nd)
- 1991 – Olympic Qualifier, Auckland (6th)
- 1993 – World Cup Qualifier, Poznan (7th)
- 1995 – Pan American Games, Mar del Plata (2nd)
- 1996 – Olympic Qualifier, Barcelona (6th)
- 1996 – World Cup Preliminary, Sardinia (2nd)
- 1997 – World Cup Qualifier, Kuala Lumpur (5th)
- 1998 – World Cup, Utrecht (8th)
- 1999 – Sultan Azlan Shah Cup, Kuala Lumpur (4th)
- 1999 – Pan American Games, Winnipeg (1st)
- 2000 – Sultan Azlan Shah Cup, Kuala Lumpur (7th)
- 2000 – Americas Cup, Cuba (2nd)
- 2000 – Olympic Games, Sydney (10th)
