= Paul Lopez =

Malaysian field hockey player (born 1968)

Personal information
- Nationality: Malaysian
- Born: 3 July 1968 (age 57)

Sport
- Sport: Field hockey

Paul Lopez (born 3 July 1968) is a Malaysian field hockey player. He competed in the men's tournament at the 1992 Summer Olympics.
