= Andrew Hastie (field hockey) =

New Zealand field hockey player

Andrew Blair Hastie (born 5 November 1970 in Christchurch) is a retired field hockey player from New Zealand, who was a regular member of the men's national team, nicknamed The Black Sticks, during the 1990s. Hastie earned a total number of 68 caps during his career. He coached the Canterbury Cavaliers to the 2005 New Zealand NHL title. Andrew has 3 children.
