= Ronnie Jagday =

Canadian field hockey player

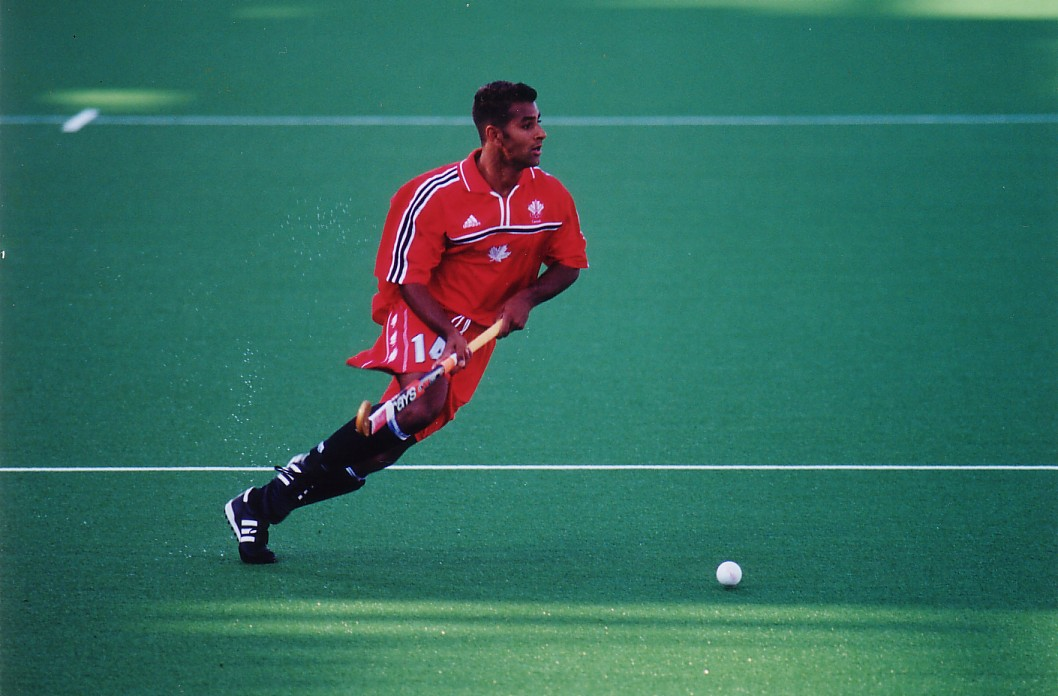

Medal record

Men's field hockey

Representing Canada

Pan American Games
Gold medal – first place	1999 Winnipeg	Team
Silver medal – second place	2003 Santo Domingo	Team

Ronnie Singh Jagday (born March 21, 1978, in Vancouver, British Columbia) is an international Canadian field hockey player, who played his first international match for the Canadian Men's National team in 1998, in Barcelona against Spain. He was a member of Canada's gold-medal winning Pan American Games team in 1999 and went on to represent Canada in the Summer Olympics in 2000.

The midfielder is the son of former Canadian coach and later USA National Men's team Coach Shiv Jagday and credits his father for introducing and teaching him the finer points of the game. He currently works in Finance, with Cisco systems in, San Jose, California.

== International senior competitions ==
- 1998 — World Cup, Utrecht (8th)
- 1998 - Commonwealth Games, Kuala Lumpur (not ranked)
- 1999 - Akhbar El Yom Tournament, Cairo (3rd)
- 1999 - Sultan Azlan Shah Tournament, Kuala Lumpur (4th)
- 1999 - Pan American Games, Winnipeg (1st)
- 2000 - Barcelona 4-Nation Tournament (4th)
- 2000 - Sultan Azlan Shah Tournament, Kuala Lumpur (7th)
- 2000 — Americas Cup, Cuba (2nd)
- 2000 - Olympic Games, Sydney (10th)
- 2001 — World Cup Qualifier, Edinburgh (8th)
- 2003 - Pan American Games, Santo Domingo (2nd)
- 2004 - Olympic Qualifying Tournament, Madrid (11th)
