= John Radovonich =

New Zealand field hockey player

John Lewis Radovonich (born 10 January 1965) is a former field hockey player from New Zealand, who finished in eighth position with the men's national team, nicknamed Black Sticks, at the 1992 Summer Olympics in Barcelona, Spain. He was born in Christchurch.
