= Jaume Amat =

Spanish field hockey player (born 1970)

Personal information
- Full name: Jaume Santi Amat Duran
- Born: 1 March 1970 (age 56) Barcelona, Spain

Sport
- Sport: Field hockey
Senior career
Years	Team	Caps	Goals
–	Club Egara	-	-
National team
Years	Team	Caps	Goals
–	Spain		-
Medal record
Men's field hockey
Representing Spain
Olympic Games
Silver medal – second place	1996 Atlanta	Team
World Cup
Silver medal – second place	1998 Utrecht	Team

Jaume Santi Amat Duran (born 1 March 1970 in Barcelona, Catalonia) is a former field hockey player from Spain. He won the silver medal with the men's national team at the 1996 Summer Olympics in Atlanta, Georgia. He is the son of Jaume Amat i Fontanals, who was Olympics same discipline at 1964 and 1972 Olympic Games.
