= Jamie Smith (field hockey) =

New Zealand field hockey player

Jamie Samuel Lawrence Smith (born 15 February 1965) is a former field hockey player from New Zealand, who finished in eighth position with the Men's National Team, nicknamed the Black Sticks, at the 1992 Summer Olympics in Barcelona, Spain. Smith was captain of the New Zealand side from 1993 to 1998. He was born in Auckland and went to King's College.

He earned a total of 160 national caps.
