= Tomasz Cichy =

Polish field hockey player

Tomasz Cichy (born 30 July 1976 in Poznań) is a Polish former field hockey player who competed in the 2000 Summer Olympics.
