= Andrew Timlin =

New Zealand field hockey player

Andrew Timlin (born 15 June 1974) is a retired field hockey player from New Zealand, who was a regular member of the men's national team, nicknamed "The Black Sticks", during the 1990s. Timlin earned a total number of 43 caps during his career. He was part of the New Zealand squad which played at the 1998 World Cup.
