= Dariusz Małecki =

Polish field hockey player

Dariusz Małecki (born 25 June 1975 in Środa Wielkopolska) is a Polish former field hockey player who competed in the 2000 Summer Olympics.
