= Santiago Capurro =

Argentine field hockey player

Santiago Capurro (born 8 April 1975) is an Argentine former field hockey player, who represented Argentina at the 1996 Summer Olympics and the 2000 Summer Olympics.

Capurro was Carlos Retegui's assistant during his two periods as coach of the Argentina women's national team. He was chosen to replace him after the 2014 Women's Hockey World Cup. After little over a year, he was replaced by Gabriel Minadeo.
