= Brett Leaver =

New Zealand field hockey player

Brett Leaver (born 12 January 1970) is a former field hockey player from New Zealand, who finished in eighth position with the Men's National Team, nicknamed Black Sticks, at the 1992 Summer Olympics in Barcelona, Spain and finished his career with 157 test caps. He was born in Auckland. Achieving high in sports and getting awards, he became an athlete at Otahuhu College and then carried it on until he became an Olympian for New Zealand.
