= Tomasz Szmidt =

Polish field hockey player (born 1971)

Tomasz Szmidt (born 14 February 1971 in Poznań) is a Polish former field hockey player who competed in the 2000 Summer Olympics.
