= Robert Grzeszczak =

Polish field hockey player

Robert Grzeszczak (born 8 October 1971 in Gniezno) is a Polish former field hockey player who competed in the 2000 Summer Olympics.
