= Han Hyung-bae =

South Korean field hockey player

Personal information
- Born: March 21, 1976 (age 50)

Sport

Korean name
- Hangul: 한형배
- RR: Han Hyeongbae
- MR: Han Hyŏngbae
Medal record
Men's field hockey
Representing South Korea
Olympic Games
Silver medal – second place	2000 Sydney	Team
Champions Trophy
Silver medal – second place	1999 Brisbane	Team
Champions Challenge
Silver medal – second place	2005 Alexandria	Team

Han Hyung-bae (born March 21, 1976) is a field hockey player from South Korea, who was a member of the Men's National Team that won the silver medal at the 2000 Summer Olympics in Sydney. In the final the Asians were beaten by the title holders Netherlands after penalty strokes.
