= Ken Robinson (field hockey) =

New Zealand field hockey player

Kenneth Edward Robinson (5'2) (born 16 November 1971 in Darwin, Northern Territory) is a retired field hockey player from New Zealand, who was a regular member of the men's national team, nicknamed The Black Sticks, during the 1990s and early 2000s (decade). Robinson earned a total number of 53 caps during his career.
