= Clyde Abrahams =

South African field hockey player

Clyde Abrahams (born 15 October 1978) is a South African field hockey player who competed in the 2008 Summer Olympics.
