= Andrew Buckley (field hockey) =

New Zealand field hockey player

Andrew Buckley (born 2 July 1973) is a retired field hockey player from New Zealand, who was a regular member of the men's national team, nicknamed The Black Sticks, during the late 1990s and early 2000s. Buckley earned a total number of 76 caps during his career.
