= Calvin Fernandez =

Malaysian field hockey player (born 1974)

Personal information
- Nationality: Malaysian
- Born: 18 November 1974 (age 51)

Sport
- Sport: Field hockey

Calvin Fernandez (born 18 November 1974) is a Malaysian field hockey player. He competed at the 1996 Summer Olympics and the 2000 Summer Olympics.
