= Scott Mosher =

Canadian field hockey player

Medal record

Representing Canada

Men's field hockey

Pan American Games
Gold medal – first place	Winnipeg 1999	Team competition

Scott Mosher (born October 25, 1973, in Ottawa, Ontario) is a former field hockey forward from Canada.

== International senior competitions ==
- 1998 – World Cup, Utrecht (8th)
- 1998 – Commonwealth Games, Kuala Lumpur (not ranked)
- 1999 – Pan American Games, Winnipeg (1st)
- 2000 – Americas Cup, Cuba (2nd)
- 2000 – Olympic Games, Sydney (10th)
