= Michael Bevin =

New Zealand field hockey player

Personal information
- Born: 25 May 1977 (age 49)
Medal record
Men's field hockey
Representing New Zealand
Commonwealth Games
Silver medal – second place	2002 Manchester	Team competition

Michael Bevin (born 25 May 1977 in Hastings, New Zealand) is a field hockey goalkeeper from New Zealand. He won a silver medal at the 2002 Commonwealth Games in the men's team competition.
