= Mike Mahood =

Canadian field hockey player

Personal information
- Born: November 11, 1975 (age 50)
Medal record
Men's field hockey
Representing Canada
Pan American Games
Gold medal – first place	2007 Rio de Janeiro	Team
Gold medal – first place	1999 Winnipeg	Team
Silver medal – second place	2003 Santo Domingo	Team

Michael Mahood (born November 11, 1975, in North Vancouver, British Columbia) is a retired field hockey goalkeeper from Canada, who earned his first international senior cap for the Men's National Team in 1995 against India in Italy. He went on to appear in 196 international matches including two Olympic Games (Sydney 2000, Beijing 2008) and the 1998 World Cup in Utrecht, Holland. In 1999 he was named to the World XI as part of the FIH 75th Anniversary celebrations in Alexandria, Egypt.

He attended Handsworth Secondary School. In his retirement Mahood has become a men's tailor in Vancouver, BC.

== International senior competitions ==
- 1996 — World Cup Preliminary, Sardinia (2nd)
- 1997 — World Cup Qualifier, Kuala Lumpur (5th)
- 1998 — World Cup, Utrecht (8th)
- 1998 — Commonwealth Games, Kuala Lumpur (not ranked)
- 1999 — Sultan Azlan Shah Tournament, Kuala Lumpur (4th)
- 1999 — Pan American Games, Winnipeg (1st)
- 2000 — Sultan Azlan Shah Tournament, Kuala Lumpur (7th)
- 2000 — Americas Cup, Cuba (2nd)
- 2000 — Olympic Games, Sydney (10th)
- 2001 — World Cup Qualifier, Edinburgh (8th)
- 2002 — Commonwealth Games, Manchester (6th)
- 2003 — Pan American Games, Santo Domingo (2nd)
- 2004 — Olympic Qualifying Tournament, Madrid (11th)
- 2004 — Pan Am Cup, London (2nd)
- 2006 — Commonwealth Games, Melbourne (9th)
- 2007 — Pan American Games, Rio de Janeiro (1st)
- 2008 — Olympic Games, Beijing (10th)
