= Hari Kant =

Canadian field hockey player

Personal information
- Born: August 23, 1969 (age 56) Ottawa, Ontario, Canada
Medal record
Men's field hockey
Representing Canada
Pan American Games
Silver medal – second place	1995 Mar del Plata	Team
Gold medal – first place	1999 Winnipeg	Team

Hari Kant (born August 23, 1969) is a former field hockey goalkeeper from Canada. The resident of Toronto, Ontario earned his first international cap for the Men's National Team in 1989 against Australia in Sydney.

== International senior competitions ==
- 1995 – Pan American Games, Mar del Plata (2nd)
- 1996 – Olympic Qualifier, Barcelona (6th)
- 1996 – World Cup Preliminary, Sardinia (2nd)
- 1997 – World Cup Qualifier, Kuala Lumpur (5th)
- 1998 – World Cup, Utrecht (8th)
- 1998 – Commonwealth Games, Kuala Lumpur (not ranked)
- 1999 – Sultan Azlan Shah Cup, Kuala Lumpur (4th)
- 1999 – Pan American Games, Winnipeg (1st)
- 2000 – Sultan Azlan Shah Cup, Kuala Lumpur (7th)
- 2000 – Americas Cup, Cuba (2nd)
- 2000 – Olympic Games, Sydney (10th)
- 2001 – World Cup Qualifier, Edinburgh (8th)
- 2002 – Indoor Pan American Cup, Rockville, USA (1st)
- 2003 – Indoor World Cup, Leipzig (6th)
- 2007 – Indoor World Cup, Vienna (7th)
- 2021 – PizzaForno, Ugliest Sweater Competition (last)
