= Rick Roberts (field hockey) =

Canadian field hockey player

Medal record

Representing Canada

Men's field hockey

Pan American Games
Silver medal – second place	Mar del Plata 1995	Team
Gold medal – first place	Winnipeg 1999	Team

Rick "Rico" Roberts (born December 8, 1967, in Vancouver, British Columbia) is a former field hockey defender from Canada.

Roberts started playing hockey in Victoria at age thirteen. He is married to former Women's National Team player Lisa Faust. Also commonly referred to as "The Hammer".
He cowrote "The Goose is in Malaysia" theme song of the Men's National Team at the 1998 Commonwealth Games with David Yule.

Roberts is currently a teacher at St. Georges Senior School in Vancouver, British Columbia, Canada. He teaches English and coaches the school's field hockey team. "Hammer" Rico is also an accomplished 12-stringer guitar player and singer.

== International senior competitions ==
- 1989 – International Student Games, Sheffield
- 1993 – World Cup Qualifier, Poznan (7th)
- 1995 – Pan American Games, Mar del Plata (2nd)
- 1996 – Olympic Qualifier, Barcelona (6th)
- 1996 – World Cup Preliminary, Sardinia (2nd)
- 1997 – World Cup Qualifier, Kuala Lumpur (5th)
- 1998 – World Cup, Utrecht (8th)
- 1998 – Commonwealth Games, Kuala Lumpur (not ranked)
- 1999 – Sultan Azlan Shah Cup, Kuala Lumpur (4th)
- 1999 – Pan American Games, Winnipeg (1st)
- 2000 – Americas Cup, Cuba (2nd)
- 2000 – Sultan Azlan Shah Cup, Kuala Lumpur (7th)
- 2000 – Olympic Games, Sydney (10th)
- 2001 – World Cup Qualifier, Edinburgh (8th)
- 2002 – Commonwealth Games, Manchester (6th)
