= Scott Anderson (field hockey) =

New Zealand hockey player

Scott Warren Anderson (born 26 June 1968) is a former field hockey goalkeeper from New Zealand, who finished in eighth position with the Men's National Team, nicknamed Black Sticks, at the 1992 Summer Olympics in Barcelona, Spain. He was born in Oamaru.
