= Gregg Clark =

South African field hockey player

Personal information
- Born: 11 January 1971 (age 55) Johannesburg, South Africa
Medal record
Men's field hockey
Champions Challenge
Bronze medal – third place	2003 Johannesburg	Team
Africa Cup of Nations
Gold medal – first place	1996 Pretoria

Gregg Clark (born 11 January 1971 in Johannesburg) is a field hockey player from South Africa, who was a member of the national squad that finished tenth at the 2004 Summer Olympics in Athens. He was also present at the Atlanta Games in 1996. The midfielder played for Durban, and a provincial team called KwaZulu Natal Raiders. He is also the most capped male South African national hockey player with 250 caps and 42 goals.

He was appointed head coach of Hockey India League's Ranchi Rhinos for its inaugural 2013 season. In January 2021, he was appointed as the analytical coach of the Indian men's hockey team.

== International senior tournaments ==
- 1994 – World Cup, Sydney (10th)
- 1996 – Hockey Africa Cup of Nations (1st)
- 1995 – All-Africa Games, Harare (1st)
- 1996 – Summer Olympics, Atlanta (10th)
- 1997 – World Cup Qualifier, Kuala Lumpur (9th)
- 1998 – Commonwealth Games, Kuala Lumpur (no ranking)
- 1999 – All-Africa Games, Johannesburg (1st)
- 2000 – Hockey Africa Cup of Nations (1st)
- 2001 – Champions Challenge, Kuala Lumpur (2nd)
- 2002 – World Cup, Kuala Lumpur (13th)
- 2002 – Commonwealth Games, Manchester (4th)
- 2003 – All-Africa Games, Abuja (2nd)
- 2003 – Champions Challenge, Johannesburg (3rd)
- 2004 – Olympic Qualifier, Madrid (7th)
- 2004 – Summer Olympics, Athens (10th)
