= Thirumal Valavan =

Indian field hockey player

Medal record

Representing India

Men's field hockey

Asian Games
Gold medal – first place	1998 Bangkok	Team

Champions Challenge
Gold medal – first place	Kuala Lumpur 2001	Team

Selvaraj Thirumal Valavan (born 27 November 1970 in Madras, Tamil Nadu) is a former field hockey midfielder from India, who made his international debut for the Men's National Team in February 1997 against Poland.

== Career ==
Valavan represented his native country at the 2000 Summer Olympics in Sydney, Australia, where India finished in seventh place.

He also participated in the year December 2002 – Hyderabad, June 1997 – Bangalore. Selvaraj Thirumala Valavan also took part at the Muruguppa Gold Cup in the year July 1998 – Chennai (lost in semi-final).

== Game history ==
He has never played for any clubs outside India. Selvaraj Thirumala Valavan has played 172 matches in the international arena with debut in the year 1997 against Poland. The tournament was held at Chennai and in that India won by 2–0–1. Other international tournaments played by him are

1. Olympics --- September 2000 – Sydney (7th)
2. World Cup --- February/March 2002 – Kuala Lumpur (10th), May 1998 – Utrecht (9th)
3. Champions Challenge --- December 2001 – Kuala Lumpur (1st)
4. Asian Games --- December 1998 – Bangkok (1st)
5. Indo-Pak Series --- February 1999 – Lost 3–6; February/March 1998 – Lost 3–4
6. Commonwealth Games --- September 1998 – Kuala Lumpur (4th)
7. Sultan Azlan Shah Cup --- February 2000 – Kuala Lumpur (3rd)
8. Prime Minister's Gold Cup --- March 2001 – Dhaka (1st)
9. Australian Tour --- April 2000 – Sydney (3rd in 4-Nation); April 2000 – Perth (1st in 4-Nation)
10. European Tour --- July 2001 – World Cup Qualifier (5th); January 2000 – Barcelona (3rd in 4-Nation), 1 GOAL; January 2000 – Belgium (2–0–1); January 2000 – Canada (1–0–0); June 1999 – Germany (1–3–0); June 1999 – Belgium (3–0–1); August 1997 – Last in 4-Nation Tourney.
11. New Zealand Tour --- June 2001 – Lost 1–2–1
12. South African Tour—August 1999 – Johannesburg – Lost 0–3–2
13. Test Series --- January 1998 – vs. Germany – Lost 0–3–1; February/March 2001 – vs. Germany – Lost 1–2.

== Honors and awards ==
For his outstanding contribution to the field of hockey, he was conferred the award Tamil Nadu Chief Minister's Sports Award in the year of 1999–2000. In the national level he has played the tournaments National Championship respectively in December 2000 held at Jammu, March 1999 held at Hyderabad where the team finished at the 2nd position, May 1997 held at Bangalore and finished at 2nd position.

== Family ==
Valavan comes from a hockey family, and is the nephew of Former International M.P. Murugesh. His father, Selvaraj, played for the State Bank of India, and his brother, Thirugnam, currently plays for Madras Port Trust. Selvaraj Thirumala Valavan currently plays for Indian Bank Team, Tamil Nadu in the position of Centre-Half.
