= Marcin Pobuta =

Polish field hockey player

Marcin Pobuta (born 5 August 1975 in Poznań) is a Polish former field hockey goalkeeper who competed in the 2000 Summer Olympics.
