= Piotr Mikuła =

Polish field hockey player

Piotr Mikuła (born 7 June 1976 in Gniezno) is a Polish former field hockey player who competed in the 2000 Summer Olympics.
