= Darren Smith (field hockey) =

New Zealand field hockey player

Personal information
- Born: 14 November 1973 (age 52) Napier, New Zealand
- Height: 1.77 m (5 ft 10 in)
- Weight: 73 kg (161 lb)
Medal record
Men's field hockey
Representing New Zealand
Commonwealth Games
Silver medal – second place	2002 Manchester	Team

Darren Campbell Smith (born 14 November 1973) is a former New Zealand field hockey player, who earned his first cap for the national team, nicknamed The Black Sticks, in 1995 against Spain. He represented New Zealand at the 2004 Summer Olympics.

Smith is currently the Head Coach of the Black Sticks a role he has had since 2017. During his time in charge of the side the team has earned a silver medal at the Commonwealth Games in the Gold Coast in 2018.

He played at two Commonwealth Games, in 1998 and 2002, winning a silver medal at the latter. His career further spans two World Cups. Smith resides in Auckland.

== International senior tournaments ==
- 1995 – Sultan Azlan Shah Cup, Kuala Lumpur
- 1997 – World Cup Qualifier, Kuala Lumpur
- 1998 – Sultan Azlan Shah Cup, Kuala Lumpur
- 1998 – Commonwealth Games, Kuala Lumpur
- 1998 – World Cup, Utrecht
- 1999 – Sultan Azlan Shah Cup, Kuala Lumpur
- 2000 – Olympic Qualifying Tournament, Osaka
- 2001 – World Cup Qualifier, Edinburgh
- 2002 – 2002 Men's Hockey World Cup, Kuala Lumpur
- 2002 – Commonwealth Games, Manchester
- 2003 – Sultan Azlan Shah Cup, Kuala Lumpur
- 2003 – Champions Challenge
- 2004 – Olympic Qualifying Tournament, Madrid
- 2004 – Champions Trophy, Lahore
- 2005 – Sultan Azlan Shah Cup, Kuala Lumpur
- 2006 – World Cup Qualifier
- 2006 – Commonwealth Games, Melbourne
