= Chairil Anwar Abdul Aziz =

Malaysian field hockey player (born 1972)

Personal information
- Nationality: Malaysian
- Born: 7 April 1972 (age 54)
- Height: 1.63 m (5 ft 4 in)
- Weight: 61 kg (134 lb)

Sport
- Sport: Field hockey
Medal record
Men's field hockey
Representing Malaysia
Asian Games
Bronze medal – third place	2002 Busan	Team
Commonwealth Games
Silver medal – second place	1998 Kuala Lumpur	Team

Chairil Anwar Abdul Aziz (born 7 April 1972) is a Malaysian field hockey player. He competed in the 1996 and 2000 Summer Olympics.
