= Zbigniew Juszczak (field hockey, born 1975) =

Polish field hockey player

Zbigniew Juszczak (born 24 October 1975, in Żnin) is a Polish former field hockey player who competed in the 2000 Summer Olympics.
