= Ian Bird (field hockey) =

Canadian field hockey player

Personal information
- Born: March 18, 1970 (age 56) Vancouver, British Columbia
Medal record
Men's field hockey
Pan American Games
Gold medal – first place	1999 Winnipeg	Team

Robert Ian Bird (born March 18, 1970, in Vancouver, British Columbia) is a former field hockey defender from Canada who competed in the Summer Olympics in 1988 and 2000.

Bird played for West Vancouver Field Hockey Club.
