= Robin D'Abreo =

Canadian field hockey player

Personal information
- Born: March 3, 1975 (age 51) Bombay, India
Medal record
Men's field hockey
Representing Canada
Pan American Games
Gold medal – first place	1999 Winnipeg	Team
Silver medal – second place	1995 Mar del Plata	Team
Silver medal – second place	2003 Santo Domingo	Team

Robin D'Abreo (born March 3, 1975, in Bombay, India) is an Indian-born Canadian field hockey player who earned his first international cap in 1993 against France.

The midfielder D'Abrero grew up with the sport in India, where both his father (Ralph D'Abreo) and older brother played the game. It was only in Canada though that D'Abreo himself started playing competitively. He began with the Toronto Field Junior Jets at age thirteen. D'Abreo is married to former Canadian Women's National Team player Dana Anderson.

== International senior competitions ==
- 1993 - Intercontinental Cup, Poznan (7th)
- 1995 - Pan American Games, Mar del Plata (2nd)
- 1996 - Olympic Qualifier, Barcelona (6th)
- 1996 - World Cup Preliminary, Sardinia (2nd)
- 1997 - World Cup Qualifier, Kuala Lumpur (5th)
- 1998 - World Cup, Utrecht (8th)
- 1998 - Commonwealth Games, Kuala Lumpur (not ranked)
- 1999 - Pan American Games, Winnipeg (1st)
- 2000 - Americas Cup, Cuba (2nd)
- 2000 - Olympic Games, Sydney (10th)
- 2001 - World Cup Qualifier, Edinburgh (8th)
- 2002 - Indoor Pan American Cup, Rockville (1st and Tournament MVP)
- 2002 - Commonwealth Games, Manchester (6th)
- 2003 - Indoor World Cup, Leipzig (6th)
- 2003 - Pan American Games, Santo Domingo (2nd)
- 2004 - Olympic Qualifying Tournament, Madrid (11th)
- 2004 - Pan Am Cup, London (2nd)
- 2006 - Commonwealth Games, Melbourne (9th)
