= Peter Milkovich =

Canadian field hockey player (born 1966)

Personal information
- Born: October 17, 1966 (age 59) Vancouver, British Columbia
Medal record
Men's field hockey
Representing Canada
Pan American Games
Silver medal – second place	1991 Havana	Team
Silver medal – second place	1995 Mar del Plata	Team
Gold medal – first place	1999 Winnipeg	Team

Peter Milkovich (born October 17, 1966) is a Canadian field hockey player and coach. He was born in Vancouver, British Columbia.
