= Rob Short =

Canadian field hockey player

Personal information
- Born: 11 August 1972 (age 54)
- Spouse: Rachel Norwood
- Children: Brek Short and Kaeden Short
Medal record
Men's field hockey
Representing Canada
Pan American Games
Gold medal – first place	1999 Winnipeg	Team
Gold medal – first place	2007 Rio de Janeiro	Team
Silver medal – second place	1995 Mar del Plata	Team
Silver medal – second place	2003 Santo Domingo	Team
Silver medal – second place	2011 Mexico	Team

Rob ("Shorty") Short (born August 11, 1972 in Maidstone, England) is a Canadian field hockey player.

== Career ==
Short played his first international senior tournament in 1995, at the Pan American Games in Mar del Plata. Highlights include the 1998 World Cup in the Netherlands where the Canadian team finished 8th, with Short scoring 4 goals in the 7 games. In 2000 he competed with the national hockey team of Canada at the Summer Olympics in Sydney, where the team finished 10th. A recent win (over Argentina in strokes) in Rio de Janeiro, Brazil, at the Pan American Games meant Rob competed in his second Olympic Games in Beijing in the summer of 2008.

Short has played club hockey at the highest level in the Netherlands since 1999; 3 years with HC Rotterdam, 2 years at Laren, and is currently playing his 9th year with HGC. Last year with HGC, he won the EHL (Euro Hockey League) and took home the MVP of the European competition and with it 5000 Euro.

In addition to playing field hockey, Short is also a business owner with Voodoo America and his academy company Rob Short Coaching.

Short currently lives with his family in North Vancouver, British Columbia. His partner is Rachel Norwood and they have two boys Brek and Kaeden (Kk) Norwood-Short.

=== International Senior Competitions ===
- 1995 – Pan American Games, Mar del Plata (2nd)
- 1996 – Olympic Qualifier, Barcelona (6th)
- 1996 – World Cup Preliminary, Sardinia (2nd)
- 1997 – World Cup Qualifier, Kuala Lumpur (5th)
- 1998 – World Cup, Utrecht (8th)
- 1998 – Commonwealth Games, Kuala Lumpur (not ranked)
- 1999 – Pan American Games, Winnipeg (1st)
- 2000 – Americas Cup, Cuba (2nd)
- 2000 – Olympic Games, Sydney (10th)
- 2001 – World Cup Qualifier, Edinburgh (8th)
- 2002 – Commonwealth Games, Manchester (6th)
- 2003 – Pan American Games, Santo Domingo (2nd)
- 2004 – Olympic Qualifier, Madrid (11th)
- 2004 – Pan Am Cup, London (2nd)
- 2006 – Commonwealth Games, Melbourne (9th)
- 2006 – World Cup Qualifier, Changzou City (10th)
- 2007 – Pan American Games, Rio (1st)
- 2008 – Olympic Games, Beijing (10th)
- 2009 — Pan American Cup, Santiago (1st)
- 2010 – Commonwealth Games, India (7th)
- 2010 – World Cup, Delhi (11th)
- 2011 – Pan American Games, Guadalajara, Mexico (2nd)

== Education ==
Rob graduated from UVIC (University of Victoria) with a Bachelor's Degree in Geography. He has also since residing in Europe achieved a diploma at BCIT (British Columbia Institute of Technology) in Web Technologies. Rob looks forward to coaching hockey both Internationally and at the club level in the future and to progress in that career in 2011 he completed a Masters in International Coaching at the Johan Cruyff Institute in Sport at Amsterdam.
