= Greg Nicol =

South African field hockey player

Personal information
- Born: 2 April 1975 (age 51)
- Height: 176 cm (5 ft 9 1/2 in)
- Weight: 76 kg (168 lb)

Sport
- Sport: Field hockey
- Position: Striker
Senior career
Years	Team	Caps	Goals
1993-1997	University of KwaZulu-Natal	-	-
2005	Holcombe (UK)	-	-
National team
Years	Team	Caps	Goals
1994-2004	South Africa		-
Medal record
Representing South Africa
Africa Cup of Nations
Gold medal – first place	1996 Pretoria

Greg Nicol (born 2 April 1975) is a South African former field hockey player who competed in the 1996 Summer Olympics and in the 2004 Summer Olympics. On 23 December 2021 he was announced as the new head coach of the New Zealand men's national team.
