= Bindi Kullar =

Canadian field hockey player

Personal information
- Full name: Bindi Singh Kullar
- Born: January 11, 1976 (age 50) Richmond, British Columbia
Medal record
Men's field hockey
Representing Canada
Pan American Games
Gold medal – first place	1999 Winnipeg	Team

Bindi Singh Kullar (born January 11, 1976, in Richmond, British Columbia) is a Canadian field hockey player, who played his first international senior tournament for the Men's National Team in 1996. His father, Pritpal Singh Kullar who hailed from Sansarpur village in Punjab, was also a field hockey player and went on to represent Canada in 1978.

== International senior competitions ==
- 1996 — World Cup Preliminary, Sardinia (2nd)
- 1997 — World Cup Qualifier, Kuala Lumpur (5th)
- 1998 — World Cup, Utrecht (8th)
- 1998 — Commonwealth Games, Kuala Lumpur (not ranked)
- 1999 — Pan American Games, Winnipeg (1st)
- 2000 — Americas Cup, Cuba (2nd)
- 2000 — Olympic Games, Sydney (10th)
- 2001 — World Cup Qualifier, Edinburgh (8th)
- 2002 — Commonwealth Games, Manchester (6th)
- 2004 — Olympic Qualifying Tournament, Madrid (11th)
- 2007 — Pan American Games, Rio de Janeiro (1st)
- 2008 — Olympic Games, Beijing (10th)
