= Dion Gosling =

New Zealand field hockey player

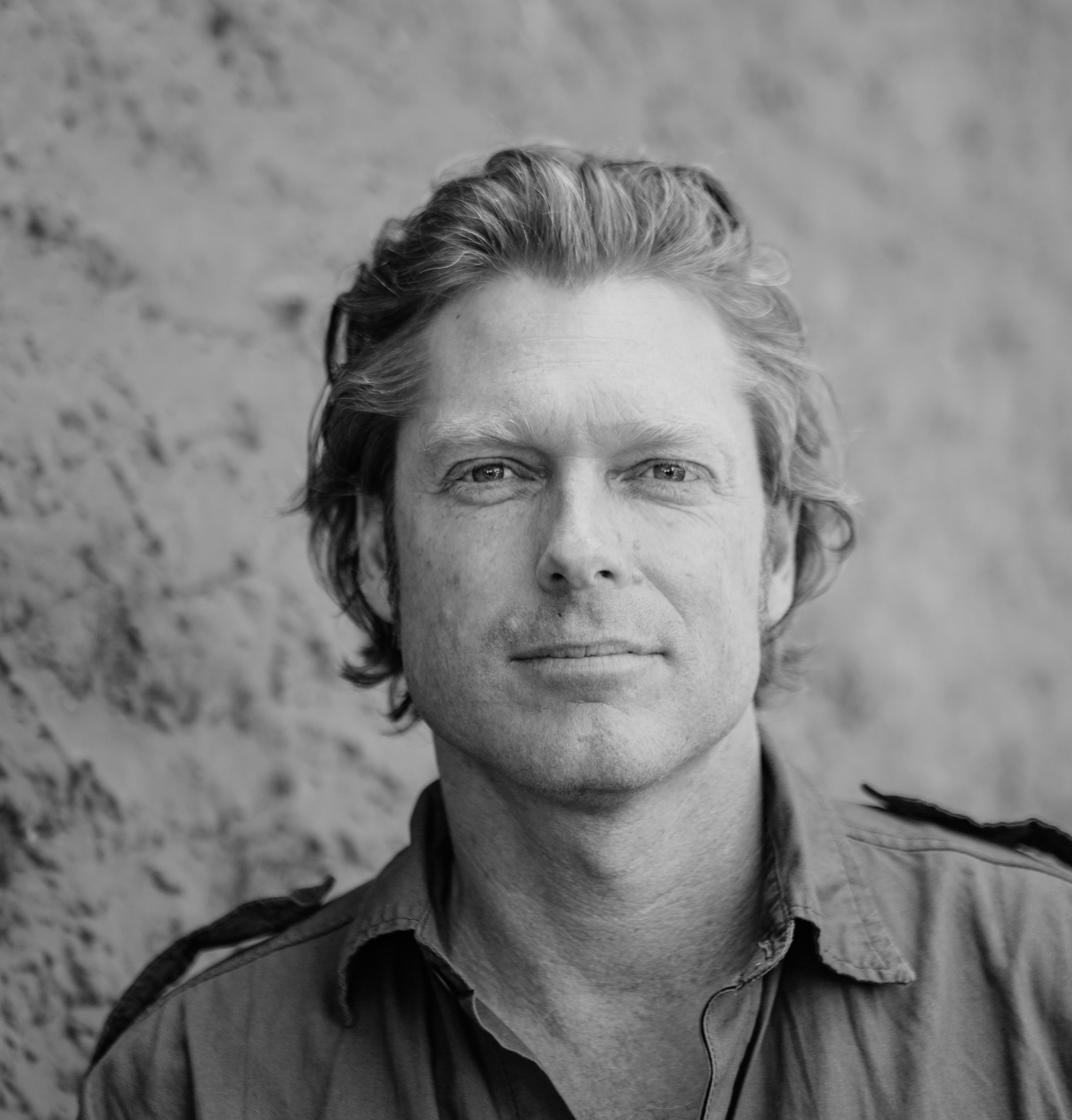

Personal information
- Born: 2 June 1971 (age 55)
Medal record
Men's field hockey
Representing New Zealand
Commonwealth Games
Silver medal – second place	2002 Manchester	Team competition

Dion Gosling (born 2 June 1971 in Howick, New Zealand) is a field hockey player from New Zealand. He won a silver medal at the 2002 Commonwealth Games in the men's team competition. He earned a total number of 169 caps during his career.
