= Simon Towns =

New Zealand field hockey player

Simon Towns MNZM
Personal information
- Full name: Simon James Towns
- Born: 17 September 1972 (age 53) Wellington, New Zealand
Medal record
Men's field hockey
Representing New Zealand
Commonwealth Games
Silver medal – second place	2002 Manchester	Team competition

Simon James Towns MNZM (born 17 September 1972) is a field hockey player from New Zealand, who earned his first cap for the national team, nicknamed The Black Sticks, in 1992 against Kenya. In the 2007 New Year Honours he was appointed a Member of the New Zealand Order of Merit for services to hockey.

== International senior tournaments ==
- 1995 – Sultan Azlan Shah Cup
- 1997 – World Cup Qualifier, Kuala Lumpur
- 1998 – Sultan Azlan Shah Cup
- 1998 – World Cup
- 1998 – Commonwealth Games
- 1999 – Sultan Azlan Shah Cup
- 2000 – Sultan Azlan Shah Cup
- 2000 – Olympic Qualifying Tournament
- 2001 – World Cup Qualifier, Edinburgh
- 2002 – World Cup
- 2002 – Commonwealth Games
- 2003 – Sultan Azlan Shah Cup
- 2003 – Champions Challenge
- 2004 – Olympic Qualifying Tournament
- 2004 – Summer Olympics
- 2004 – Champions Trophy
- 2005 – Sultan Azlan Shah Cup
- 2011 – NYCFHC Man of the Match, vs Greenwich 2s
