= Field hockey at the 1999 Pan American Games =

- Venue: Kildonan-East Collegiate
- Start date: 24 July 1999
- End date: 4 August 1999

The Field Hockey Tournament at the 1999 Pan American Games was held on the pitch of the Kildonan-East Collegiate near Winnipeg, Manitoba, Canada, from Saturday July 24 to Wednesday August 4. It served as a qualification tournament for the 2000 Summer Olympics in Sydney, Australia.

== Qualification ==
=== Men's qualification ===
Dates	Event	Location	Quotas	Qualifier(s)
12–25 March 1995	1995 Pan American Games	Mar del Plata, Argentina	5	Argentina; Canada; Cuba; Trinidad and Tobago; United States
10–20 August 1998	1998 CAC Games	Caracas, Venezuela	1	Mexico
1998	1998 South American Championship	Santiago, Chile	1	Chile
Total			7	

=== Women's qualification ===
Dates	Event	Location	Quotas	Qualifier(s)
12–25 March 1995	1999 Pan American Games	Mar del Plata, Argentina	5	Argentina; Canada; Cuba; Trinidad and Tobago; United States
10–20 August 1998	1998 CAC Games	Caracas, Venezuela	1	Mexico
1998	1998 South American Championship	Santiago, Chile	1	Chile
Total			7	

== Medal summary ==
=== Medal table ===
* Host nation (Canada)

Rank	Nation	Gold	Silver	Bronze	Total
1	Argentina	1	1	0	2
2	Canada*	1	0	1	2
3	United States	0	1	0	1
4	Cuba	0	0	1	1
Totals (4 entries)		2	2	2	6

== Men's tournament ==
Men's field hockey at the 1999 Pan American Games
Tournament details
- Host country: Canada
- City: Winnipeg
- Dates: 24 July – 4 August
- Teams: 7 (from 1 confederation)
- Venue: Kildonan-East Collegiate

Final positions
- Champions: Canada (3rd title)
- Runner-up: Argentina
- Third place: Cuba

Tournament statistics
- Matches played: 23
- Goals scored: 117 (5.09 per match)
- Top scorer: (Canada) Peter Milkovich (9 goals)

The hosts Canada wo their third gold medal by defeating the two-time defending champions Argentina 1–0 in the final. Cuba won the bronze medal by defeating Chile 6–0.

=== Preliminary round ===
==== Standings ====
Pos	Team	Pld	W	D	L	GF	GA	GD	Pts	Qualification
1	Canada (H)	6	5	1	0	28	5	+23	16	Final
2	Argentina	6	5	1	0	29	7	+22	16	Final
3	Cuba	6	3	1	2	12	15	−3	10	Bronze medal match
4	Chile	6	2	2	2	11	16	−5	8	Bronze medal match
5	United States	6	1	2	3	11	12	−1	5	
6	Trinidad and Tobago	6	1	1	4	13	25	−12	4	
7	Mexico	6	0	0	6	6	30	−24	0	

Source: PAHF
(H) Hosts

==== Results ====
July 24, 1999
18:00

United States	1–1	Chile
Steve Jennings 41'		Jorge O'Ryan 41'

July 24, 1999
20:00

Canada	7–0	Trinidad and Tobago
Andrew Griffiths 19'; Scott Mosher 22'; Paul Wettlaufer; Andrew Griffiths 37'; Peter Milkovich 45' (ps); Peter Milkovich 46' (ps); Rob Short 59'

Umpires:
Xavier Adell (ESP)
Marcelo Servetto (ARG)

July 25, 1999
18:00

Cuba	1–4	Argentina

July 25, 1999
20:00

Mexico	0–5	Canada
		Scott Mosher 19'; Bindi Kullar 35'; Peter Milkovich 46' (pc); Paul Wettlaufer 48'; Scott Mosher 65'

Umpires:
Cameron Burke (BAR)
Richard Wisdom (JAM)

July 26, 1999
15:00

Trinidad and Tobago	1–1	United States
Brian Garcia 44'		Scott Williams 19' (ps)

Umpires:
Xavier Adell (ESP)
Chris Wilson (CAN)

July 26, 1999
17:00

Cuba	1–1	Chile

July 26, 1999
19:00

Mexico	1–6	Argentina

July 27, 1999
17:00

Canada	2–0	United States
Paul Wettlaufer 33'; Peter Milkovich 70' (pc)

Umpires:
Xavier Adell (ESP)
Roger St. Rose (TRI)

July 27, 1999
19:00

Trinidad and Tobago	2–4	Chile

July 28, 1999
15:00

Cuba	3–0	Mexico

July 28, 1999
17:00

Argentina	3–3	Canada
Santiago Capurro 6'; Tomás MacCormik 21'; Santiago Capurro 53'		Peter Milkovich 23' (pc); Peter Milkovich 37' (pc); Peter Milkovich 60' (pc)

Umpires:
Cameron Burke (BAR)
Steve Simpson (USA)

July 29, 1999
15:00

Mexico	2–3	Chile

July 30, 1999
11:00

Cuba	3–2	Trinidad and Tobago

July 30, 1999
13:00

Argentina	4–1	United States
Rodrigo Vila 6'; Jorge Lombi 35' (pc); Fernando Moresi 49' (pc); Jorge Lombi 60' (pc)		Scott Williams 63' (pc)

Umpires:
Roberto Lopez (CUB)
Chris Wilson (CAN)

July 31, 1999
13:00

Cuba	0–6	Canada
		Peter Milkovich 9' (pc); Rob Short 15'; Scott Mosher 25' (pc); Bindi Kullar 44'; Ian Bird 53' (pc); Ian Bird 63' (pc)

Umpires:
Marcelo Servetto (ARG)
Roger St. Rose (TRI)

July 31, 1999
15:00

Argentina	7–1	Trinidad and Tobago

August 1, 1999
11:00

Mexico	0–6	United States
		Steve Jennings 21' (pc); Shawn Nakamura 26' (pc); Jang Badesha 35'; Scott Williams 39'; Jeremy Cook 52'; Shawn Nakamura 61' (pc)

Umpires:
Xavier Adell (ESP)
Cameron Burke (BAR)

August 1, 1999
13:00

Canada	5–2	Chile
Rob Short 16' (pc); Scott Mosher 31' (pc); Chris Gifford 39'; Peter Milkovich 44' (pc); Andrew Griffiths 49'		Sven Schonborn 6' (pc); Luis Montegu 69' (pc)

Umpires:
Roberto Lopez (CUB)
Steve Simpson (USA)

August 2, 1999
11:00

Mexico	3–7	Trinidad and Tobago

August 2, 1999
13:00

Cuba	4–2	United States
Ulises Lapera 14' (pc); Juan Benavides 49' (pc); Ulises Lapera 62'; Vladimir Reyes 68' (pc)		Shawn Hindy 22'; Shawn Hindy 34'

Umpires:
José Ramirez (MEX)
Roger St. Rose (TRI)

August 2, 1999
15:00

Argentina	5–0	Chile

=== Medal round ===
==== Bronze Medal Game ====
August 4, 1999
09:00

Cuba	6–0	Chile

==== Final ====
August 4, 1999
18:30

Canada	1–0	Argentina
Ken Pereira 29'

Umpires:
Xavier Adell (ESP)
Roger St. Rose (TRI)

=== Final standings ===
Pos	Team	Qualification
1st place, gold medalist(s)	Canada (H)	2000 Summer Olympics
2nd place, silver medalist(s)	Argentina	2000 Olympic Qualifier
3rd place, bronze medalist(s)	Cuba	
4	Chile	
5	United States	
6	Trinidad and Tobago	
7	Mexico	

Source: PAHF
(H) Host

=== Top goalscorers ===
There were 117 goals scored in 23 matches, for an average of 5.09 goals per match.

9 goals

- (Canada) Peter Milkovich

7 goals

- (Argentina) Santiago Capurro
- (Argentina) Jorge Lombi
- (Cuba) Luis Lapera

5 goals

- (Canada) Scott Mosher
- (Trinidad and Tobago) Brian Garcia

4 goals

- (Cuba) Juan Benavides

Source: PAHF

== Women's tournament ==
=== Preliminary round ===
Pos	Team	Pld	W	D	L	GF	GA	GD	Pts	Qualification
1	Argentina	6	6	0	0	23	2	+21	18	Final
2	United States	6	5	0	1	13	2	+11	15	Final
3	Canada (H)	6	4	0	2	20	5	+15	12	Bronze-medal match
4	Trinidad and Tobago	6	2	1	3	5	14	−9	7	Bronze-medal match
5	Cuba	6	2	0	4	12	16	−4	6	
6	Chile	6	0	2	4	2	19	−17	2	
7	Mexico	6	0	1	5	0	17	−17	1	

Source: PAHF
(H) Hosts

=== Medal round ===
==== Bronze medal match ====
4 August 1999
11:30

Canada	2–0	Trinidad and Tobago
Kopeck 32', 41'	Report

Umpires:
Alicia Takeda (MEX)
Soledad Iparraguirre (ARG)

==== Final ====
4 August 1999
16:00

Argentina	5–2	United States
Oneto 16', 35'; Aicega 42'; Masotta 47'; Gulla 67'	Report	Werley 2'; Tagliente 35'

Umpires:
Gina Spitaleri (ITA)
Gillian Clarke (ENG)

=== Final standings ===
Pos	Team	Qualification
1st place, gold medalist(s)	Argentina	2000 Summer Olympics
2nd place, silver medalist(s)	United States	2000 Olympic Qualifier
3rd place, bronze medalist(s)	Canada (H)	
4	Trinidad and Tobago	
5	Cuba	
6	Chile	
7	Mexico	

Source: PAHF
(H) Host
