= Pakistan national field hockey team tours and matches (2000–2004) =

- Season: 2000–2004

This page lists all the tours and matches played by Pakistan national field hockey team from 2000 to 2004. During this period Pakistan's most successful competition were the Hockey Champions Trophy (Third place: 2002, 2003,2004). Pakistan won the 2000 Sultan Azlan Shah Cup becoming the first team to defend the title. Pakistan finished fourth at the 2002 Asian Games, first time the team failed to win a medal at the event.

== Results ==
=== 2000 ===
==== 2000 Sultan Azlan Shah Cup ====
17 February 2000
Pool stage

South Korea	1 – 1	Pakistan
Kon Yeo 16'	Report	Bashir 33'

Kuala Lumpur, Malaysia
Stadium: Malaysia National Hockey Stadium

18 February 2000
Pool stage

Pakistan	2 – 1	India
Raza 7'; Jawad 28'	Report	Baljit 53'

Kuala Lumpur, Malaysia
Stadium: Malaysia National Hockey Stadium

20 February 2000
Pool stage

New Zealand	1 – 3	Pakistan
Parag 12'	Report	Raza 23'; Bashir 29'; Yousuf 43'

Kuala Lumpur, Malaysia
Stadium: Malaysia National Hockey Stadium

21 February 2000
Pool stage

Pakistan	3 – 2	Malaysia
Yousuf 6', 63'; Ashraf 13'	Report	Huat 53'; Shanmuganathan 60'

Kuala Lumpur, Malaysia
Stadium: Malaysia National Hockey Stadium

23 February 2000
Pool stage

Germany	2 – 4	Pakistan
Kunz 7'; Crone 36'	Report	Ashraf 15'; Jawad 29'; Yousuf 38'; Bashir 59'

Kuala Lumpur, Malaysia
Stadium: Malaysia National Hockey Stadium

24 February 2000
Pool stage

Pakistan	2 – 1	Canada
Yousuf 34'; Sarwar 50'	Report	Campbell 25'

Kuala Lumpur, Malaysia
Stadium: Malaysia National Hockey Stadium

26 February 2000
Final

Pakistan	1 – 0	South Korea
Ashraf 70'	Report

Kuala Lumpur, Malaysia
Stadium: Malaysia National Hockey Stadium

==== 2000 Olympic Qualifiers ====
10 March 2000
Pool stage

Pakistan	7 – 3	Switzerland
Ashraf 23'; Jawad 37'; Sarwar 39'; Anis 43', 48'; Abbas 64', 69'	Report	Grandchamp 9'; Steinemann 20'; Bilgerig 51'

Osaka, Japan
Stadium: Nagai Hockey Stadium

11 March 2000
Pool stage

Spain	4 – 4	Pakistan
Dinarés 17'; Ribas 33', 34'; Tubau 62'	Report	Abbas 4', 8', 26', 41'

Osaka, Japan
Stadium: Nagai Hockey Stadium

13 March 2000
Pool stage

Pakistan	6 – 0	Belarus
Nadeem 3'; Abbas 21', 25', 40'; Jawad 55'; Raza 69'	Report

Osaka, Japan
Stadium: Nagai Hockey Stadium

15 March 2000
Pool stage

Malaysia	2 – 5	Pakistan
Nawawi 48'; Shanmuganathan 64'	Report	Nadeem 22', 63'; Jawad 40'; Sarwar 61'; Yousaf 67'

Osaka, Japan
Stadium: Nagai Hockey Stadium

16 March 2000
Pool stage

Pakistan	3 – 4	Argentina
Abbas 11'; Anis 33'; Nadeem 67'	Report	Lombi 18'; Pellegrino 23'; Capurro 31', 46'

Osaka, Japan
Stadium: Nagai Hockey Stadium

18 March 2000
Semifinal

South Korea	1 – 3	Pakistan
Jong–Ha 44'	Report	Abbas 52'; Hussain 64', 70'

Osaka, Japan
Stadium: Nagai Hockey Stadium

20 March 2000
Final

Pakistan	2 – 3	Spain
Abbas 43', 70'	Report	Tubau 17'; Ribas 34'; Arnau 57'

Osaka, Japan
Stadium: Nagai Hockey Stadium

==== 2000 Series – Australia ====
8 August 2000
Test match

Australia	4 – 2	Pakistan
Brennan 1'; Elder 23', 60'; Davies 70'	Report	Abbas 30', 41'

Perth, Australia
Stadium: Perth Hockey Stadium

11 August 2000
Test match

Australia	1 – 2	Pakistan
Elder 70'	Report	Abbas 12'; Nadeem 65'

Perth, Australia
Stadium: Perth Hockey Stadium

13 August 2000
Test match

Australia	1 – 1	Pakistan
Stacy 3'	Report	Ahmed 32'

Perth, Australia
Stadium: Perth Hockey Stadium

==== 2000 Series – New Zealand ====
29 August 2000
Test match

New Zealand	2 – 2	Pakistan
Burrows 32'; Smith 40'	Report	Bashir 14', 28'

Auckland, New Zealand
Stadium: Lloyd Elsmore Park

31 August 2000
Test match

New Zealand	0 – 1	Pakistan
	Report	Abbas 35'

Albany, New Zealand

2 September 2000
Test match

New Zealand	0 – 1	Pakistan
	Report	Jawad 27'

Hamilton, New Zealand

3 September 2000
Test match

New Zealand	1 – 5	Pakistan
	Report	Sarwar 2'; Abbas 14'; Bashir 23', 58'; Jawad 62'

Auckland, New Zealand
Stadium: Lloyd Elsmore Park

==== 2000 Summer Olympics ====
16 September 2000
Pool stage

Canada	2 – 2	Pakistan
Pereira 5'; Campbell 22'	Report	Ashraf 16'; Abbas 34'

Sydney, Australia
Stadium: Sydney Olympic Park Hockey Centre

18 September 2000
Pool stage

Great Britain	1 – 8	Pakistan
Pearn 20'	Report	Abbas 7', 10', 31'; Nadeem 19', 70+'; Bashir 51', 55'; Sarwar 62'

Sydney, Australia
Stadium: Sydney Olympic Park Hockey Centre

21 September 2000
Pool stage

Germany	1 – 1	Pakistan
Domke 19'	Report	Abbas 30'

Sydney, Australia
Stadium: Sydney Olympic Park Hockey Centre

23 September 2000
Pool stage

Malaysia	2 – 2	Pakistan
Suhaimi 21', 63'	Report	Bashir 24'; Abbas 70+'

Sydney, Australia
Stadium: Sydney Olympic Park Hockey Centre

26 September 2000
Pool stage

Netherlands	0 – 2	Pakistan
	Report	Abbas 22'; Jawad 67'

Sydney, Australia
Stadium: Sydney Olympic Park Hockey Centre

28 September 2000
Semifinal

Pakistan	0 – 1	South Korea
	Report	Song Seung–tae 57'

Sydney, Australia
Stadium: Sydney Olympic Park Hockey Centre

30 September 2000
Third and fourth place

Pakistan	3 – 6	Australia
Bashir 6'; Abbas 46'; Javad 70+'	Report	Elder 3', 8', 60'; Davies 30'; Elmer 49'; Brennan 66'

Sydney, Australia
Stadium: Sydney Olympic Park Hockey Centre

=== 2001 ===
==== Prime Ministers Gold Cup ====
11 March 2001
Pool stage

Pakistan	3 – 1	China
Abbas 8', 68'; Nadeem 41'	Report	Wang 55'

Dhaka, Bangladesh
Stadium: Maulana Bhasani Hockey Stadium

13 March 2001
Pool stage

Pakistan	4 – 1	Egypt
Jawad 26', 49'; Nadeem 54'; Hussain 64'	Report	El Sayed 44'

Dhaka, Bangladesh
Stadium: Maulana Bhasani Hockey Stadium

15 March 2001
Pool stage

Ireland	1 – 6	Pakistan
	Report

Dhaka, Bangladesh
Stadium: Maulana Bhasani Hockey Stadium

16 March 2001
Pool stage

Pakistan	3 – 1	Malaysia
Zeeshan 20', 29'; Ashraf 40'	Report	Muganathan 65'

Dhaka, Bangladesh
Stadium: Maulana Bhasani Hockey Stadium

18 March 2001
Semifinal

Pakistan	5 – 3	Japan
Abbas 8', 18', 39'; Hussain 15'; Jawad 58'	Report	Makoto 16'; Takahiko 33', 40'

Dhaka, Bangladesh
Stadium: Maulana Bhasani Hockey Stadium

20 March 2001
Final

India	3 – 3	Pakistan
Krishnan 21', 23'; Tirkey 68'	Report	Sarwar 16', 29'; Nadeem 58'
Penalties
(penalty shoot-out scored) Baljit; (penalty shoot-out scored) Halappa; (penalty shoot-out missed) Inderjit; (penalty shoot-out missed) Prabhjot; (penalty shoot-out scored) Daljit	3 – 2	(penalty shoot-out missed) Abbas; (penalty shoot-out missed) Sarwar; (penalty shoot-out scored) Hussain; (penalty shoot-out scored) Ahmed; (penalty shoot-out missed) Nadeem

Dhaka, Bangladesh
Stadium: Maulana Bhasani Hockey Stadium

==== 2001 Series – Spain ====
15 June 2001
Test match

Spain	2 – 6	Pakistan
	Report	Abbas 31', 48'; Bashir 53', 68'; Jawad 61'; Sarwar 66'

Terrassa, Spain

Stadium: Terrassa Hockey Stadium

17 June 2001
Test match

Spain	3 – 3	Pakistan
	Report	Abbas 20'; Sarwar 44'; Saqlain 57'

Barcelona, Spain

==== International match – Germany ====
20 June 2001
Test match

Germany	4 – 2	Pakistan
Michel 15', 29'; Hentschel 27'; Eimer 47'	Report	Ghazanfar 54'; Abbas 66'

Duisburg, Germany

==== 2001 Panasonic Masters ====
22 June 2001
Match 1

Netherlands	1 – 1	Pakistan
Brouwer 54'	Report	Abbas 60'

Hamburg, Germany

Stadium: Uhlenhorster Hockey Club

23 June 2001
Match 2

Germany	3 – 2	Pakistan
Weß 31'; Eimer; Domke 70'	Report	Abbas 5'; Bashir 41'

Hamburg, Germany

Stadium: Uhlenhorster Hockey Club

24 June 2001
Match 3

Pakistan	8 – 6	South Korea
Abbas 17', 40', 63'; Z. Ashraf 33'; Nadeem 44', 52'; Mudassar 59', 62'	Report

Hamburg, Germany

Stadium: Uhlenhorster Hockey Club

==== International match – Belgium ====
26 June 2001
Test match

Belgium	2 – 1	Pakistan
	Report	Abbas 23'

Antwerp, Belgium

==== 2001 Series – Netherlands ====
29 June 2001
Test match

Netherlands	2 – 2	Pakistan
Lomans 36'; Tendionozr 42'	Report	Jawad 10'; Usman 35'

Drachten, Netherlands

Stadium: Drachten Hockey Club

30 June 2001
Test match

Netherlands	0 – 3	Pakistan
	Report	Jawad 15'; Mudassar 35'; Abbas 61'

Utrecht, Netherlands

1 July 2001
Test match

Netherlands	2 – 2	Pakistan
de Nooijer 31'; Taekema 66'	Report	Abbas 11'; Bashir 62'

The Hague, Netherlands

==== 2001 Sultan Azlan Shah Cup ====
2 August 2001
Pool stage

Australia	5 – 3	Pakistan
M. Smith 10', 49'; McCann 17'; Elder 38', 44'	Report	Abbas 13'; Bashir 51'; Nadeem 66'

Kuala Lumpur, Malaysia
Stadium: Malaysia National Hockey Stadium

3 August 2001
Pool stage

Pakistan	2 – 2	South Korea
Nadeem 10'; Abbas 40'	Report	Yoo M. 7'; Seo 22'

Kuala Lumpur, Malaysia
Stadium: Malaysia National Hockey Stadium

E

5 August 2001
Pool stage

Pakistan	4 – 3	India
Jawad 18', 36'; Shabbir 27'; Abbas 60'	Report	Baljit 28'; Deepak 32'; Jugraj 54'

Kuala Lumpur, Malaysia
Stadium: Malaysia National Hockey Stadium

6 August 2001
Pool stage

England	3 – 4	Pakistan
Hall 25', 63'; Bertram 68'	Report	Abbas 5', 60'; Jawad 30'; Sarwar 43'

Kuala Lumpur, Malaysia
Stadium: Malaysia National Hockey Stadium

8 August 2001
Pool stage

Malaysia	3 – 4	Pakistan
Maninderjit 23'; Kuhan 37'; Krishnamurthy 50'	Report	Abbas 7', 62', 62'; Bashir 66'

Kuala Lumpur, Malaysia
Stadium: Malaysia National Hockey Stadium

9 August 2001
Pool stage

Pakistan	3 – 5	Germany
Jawad 4', 40'; Abbas 32'	Report	Domke 3', 28'; Reinelt 9'; Kunz 19'; Weß 21'

Kuala Lumpur, Malaysia
Stadium: Malaysia National Hockey Stadium

12 August 2001
Third and fourth place

Australia	4 – 3	Pakistan
Elder 8'; Taylor 11'; Davis 35'; Dwyer 50'	Report	Khalid 15', 64'; Abbas 51'

Kuala Lumpur, Malaysia
Stadium: Malaysia National Hockey Stadium

==== 2001 Hockey Champions Trophy ====
3 November 2001
Pool stage

Netherlands	1 – 1	Pakistan
Taekema 9'	Report	Abbas 27'

Rotterdam, Netherlands
Stadium: Hazelaarweg Stadion

4 November 2001
Pool stage

Pakistan	2 – 0	South Korea
Jawad 6', 63'	Report

Rotterdam, Netherlands
Stadium: Hazelaarweg Stadion

6 November 2001
Pool stage

Australia	3 – 1	Pakistan
Hiskins 42', 55'; Commens 68'	Report	Abbas 66'

Rotterdam, Netherlands
Stadium: Hazelaarweg Stadion

7 November 2001
Pool stage

Pakistan	4 – 5	Germany
Abbas 34', 35', 51'; Sarwar 56'	Report	Domke 5'; Green 28'; Kunz 30', 54'; Wein 32'

Rotterdam, Netherlands
Stadium: Hazelaarweg Stadion

10 November 2001
Pool stage

England	3 – 6	Pakistan
Pearn 15'; Wyatt 24'; Hall 53'	Report	Abbas 7', 35'; Jawad 35', 60', 69'; Nadeem 64'

Rotterdam, Netherlands
Stadium: Hazelaarweg Stadion

11 November 2001
Third and fourth place

Pakistan	2 – 5	Netherlands
Jawad 41'; Abbas 69'	Report	de Nooijer 13'; Brouwer 22'; Taekema 30'; Eikelboom 44'; Lomans 51'

Rotterdam, Netherlands
Stadium: Hazelaarweg Stadion

=== 2002 ===
==== International match – Malaysia ====
16 January 2002
Test match

Malaysia	3 – 3	Pakistan
	Report

Kuala Lumpur, Malaysia

Stadium: Malaysia National Hockey Stadium

==== Six Nations Tournament ====
18 January 2002
Pool stage

Pakistan	3 – 0	Netherlands
Jawad 10'; Saqlain 24'; Abbas 63'	Report

Kuala Lumpur, Malaysia

Stadium: Malaysia National Hockey Stadium

20 January 2002
Pool stage

Malaysia	1 – 4	Pakistan
Rosli 63'	Report	Saqlain 10'; Shahbaz Sr. 45'; Jawad 67'; Abbas 69'

Kuala Lumpur, Malaysia

Stadium: Malaysia National Hockey Stadium

21 January 2002
Pool stage

Pakistan	9 – 1	Japan
Abbas 11', 61'; Jawad 16', 45', 67'; Hussain 18', 19'; Sarwar 40', 70'	Report	Yamabori 6'

Kuala Lumpur, Malaysia

Stadium: Malaysia National Hockey Stadium

23 January 2002
Pool stage

Pakistan	3 – 1	New Zealand
Abbas 35'; Jawad 49'; Saleem 55'	Report	Robinson 12'

Kuala Lumpur, Malaysia

Stadium: Malaysia National Hockey Stadium

24 January 2002
Pool stage

Australia	2 – 2	Pakistan
Hiskins 3', 32'	Report	Jawad 28'; Abbas 38'

Kuala Lumpur, Malaysia

Stadium: Malaysia National Hockey Stadium

26 January 2002
Final

Pakistan	4 – 3 (a.e.t.)	Australia
Sarwar 3'; Shahbaz Sr. 26'; Abbas 44'; Jawad 75'	Report	Elder 14'; Sproule 57'; Smith 68'

Kuala Lumpur, Malaysia

Stadium: Malaysia National Hockey Stadium

==== 2002 Hockey World Cup ====
24 February 2002
Pool stage

Pakistan	5 – 0	South Africa
Bashir 25', 56'; Abbas 39', 63'; Shabbir 54'	Report

Kuala Lumpur, Malaysia

Stadium: Malaysia National Hockey Stadium

25 February 2002
Pool stage

Pakistan	3 – 2	Belgium
Abbas 10', 41'; Saleem 50'	Report	Khopolov 5'; Brooke 36'

Kuala Lumpur, Malaysia

Stadium: Malaysia National Hockey Stadium

27 February 2002
Pool stage

Pakistan	2 – 0	New Zealand
Shahbaz Sr. 39'; Saleem 57'	Report

Kuala Lumpur, Malaysia

Stadium: Malaysia National Hockey Stadium

28 February 2002
Pool stage

Argentina	2 – 1	Pakistan
MacCormik 46'; Paredes 59'	Report	Abbas 9'

Kuala Lumpur, Malaysia

Stadium: Malaysia National Hockey Stadium

2 March 2002
Pool stage

Pakistan	1 – 2	Netherlands
Saleem 55'	Report	Lomans 19', 37'

Kuala Lumpur, Malaysia

Stadium: Malaysia National Hockey Stadium

3 March 2002
Pool stage

Spain	0 – 2	Pakistan
	Report	Raza 60'; Bashir 67'

Kuala Lumpur, Malaysia

Stadium: Malaysia National Hockey Stadium

5 March 2002
Pool stage

Pakistan	2 – 3	Germany
Abbas 35+', 38'	Report	Reinelt 20'; Kunz 24', 50'

Kuala Lumpur, Malaysia

Stadium: Malaysia National Hockey Stadium

7 March 2002
Crossover

Malaysia	1 – 2	Pakistan
Tajol 59'	Report	Abbas 19'; Shahbaz Sr. 53'

Kuala Lumpur, Malaysia

Stadium: Malaysia National Hockey Stadium

8 March 2002
Fifth and sixth place

Argentina	3 – 5	Pakistan
Lombi 11', 45'; Zylberberg 29'	Report	Raza 22'; Abbas 24', 62'; Nadeem 62'; Jawad 70'

Kuala Lumpur, Malaysia

Stadium: Malaysia National Hockey Stadium

==== 2002 Series – Spain ====
14 July 2002
Test match

Spain	1 – 1	Pakistan
	Report	Butt 46'

Gijón, Spain

16 July 2002
Test match

Spain	2 – 4	Pakistan
	Report	Abbas 31', 56'; Sarwar 43'; Mudassar 60'

Alaves, Spain

18 July 2002

Spain	2 – 3	Pakistan
	Report	Abbas 27', 56'; Ashraf 63'

Santander, Spain

Stadium: La Albericia Hockey Field

20 July 2002
Test match

Spain	3 – 5	Pakistan
	Report	Butt 13', 41'; Abbas 22', 58'; Jawad 31'

Madrid, Spain

==== 2002 Commonwealth Games ====
27 July 2002
Pool stage

England	0 – 3	Pakistan
	Report	Abbas 16', 20', 38'

Manchester, England

Stadium: Belle Vue Hockey Centre

28 July 2002
Pool stage

Pakistan	3 – 0	Wales
Ashraf 12', 41'; Nadeem 37'	Report

Manchester, England

Stadium: Belle Vue Hockey Centre

30 July 2002
Pool stage

Pakistan	2 – 0	Canada
Saqlain 21'; Abbas 62'	Report

Manchester, United Kingdom

Stadium: Belle Vue Hockey Centre

2 August 2002
Semifinal

Pakistan	1 – 7	New Zealand
Nadeem 44'	Report	Parag 1'; Hari 3'; Hopping 21'; Burrows 46', 63', 68'; Shaw 60'

Manchester, England

Stadium: Belle Vue Hockey Centre

4 August 2002
Third and fourth place

Pakistan	10 – 2	South Africa
Abbas 11', 33', 34', 42', 48'; Nadeem 14'; Mudassar 53'; Jawad 59'; Ghazanfar 60'; Shabbir 68'	Report	Clark 25'; E. Smith 28'

Manchester, England

Stadium: Belle Vue Hockey Centre

==== 2002 Hockey Champions Trophy ====
31 August 2002
Pool stage

Germany	3 – 2	Pakistan
Domke 19'; Kunz 66'; Emmerling 68'	Report	Jawad 21'; Sarwar 51'

Cologne, Germany

Stadium: Kölner Stadtwald

1 September 2002
Pool stage

South Korea	1 – 4	Pakistan
Shin Seok-kyo 66'	Report	Mudassar 18'; Jawad 20'; Abbas 43'; Sarwar 51'

Cologne, Germany

Stadium: Kölner Stadtwald

3 September 2002
Pool stage

Pakistan	1 – 3	Netherlands
Nadeem 70'	Report	Taekema 33', 34'; De Nooijer 42'

Cologne, Germany

Stadium: Kölner Stadtwald

4 September 2002
Pool stage

India	3 – 2	Pakistan
P. Singh 20'; Tirkey 34'; G. Singh 52'	Report	Ghazanfar 22'; Abbas 54'

Cologne, Germany

Stadium: Kölner Stadtwald

6 September 2002
Pool stage

Pakistan	2 – 0	Australia
Abbas 22'; Mudassar 57'	Report

Cologne, Germany

Stadium: Kölner Stadtwald

8 September 2002
Third and fourth place

India	3 – 4	Pakistan
J. Singh 12'; D. Tirkey 48'; G. Singh 53'	Report	Mudassaar 28', 59'; Butt 62', 63'

Cologne, Germany

Stadium: Kölner Stadtwald

==== 2002 Asian Games ====
30 September 2002
Pool stage

Pakistan	8 – 3	China
Abbas 12', 40'; Jawad 16', 38', 46'; Khalid 24'; Nadeem 30', 59'	Report	Yi 7'; Xiahoui 65'; Hui Ren 68'

Busan, South Korea

Stadium: Gangseo Hockey Stadium

4 October 2002
Pool stage

Bangladesh	0 – 9	Pakistan
	Report	Khalid 5', 23'; Mudassar 13'; Abbas 27', 54'; Ghazanfar 30'; Shabbir 33'; Jawad 46'; Butt 58'

Busan, South Korea

Stadium: Gangseo Hockey Stadium

6 October 2002
Pool stage

Malaysia	1 – 6	Pakistan
Shanmuganathan 43'	Report	Jawad 20', 51'; Nadeem 31'; Mudassar 34', 40'; Khalid 60'

Busan, South Korea

Stadium: Gangseo Hockey Stadium

10 October 2002
Semifinal

Pakistan	3 – 4	India
Abbas 10', 26'; Shabbir 63'	Report	Pillay 6', 21'; Daljit 41'; G. Singh 67'

Busan, South Korea

Stadium: Gangseo Hockey Stadium

12 October 2002
Third and fourth place

Malaysia	1 – 1 (a.e.t.)	Pakistan
Raj 39'	Report	Abbas 23'
Penalties
(penalty shoot-out scored) Raj; (penalty shoot-out scored) Boon Huat; (penalty shoot-out scored) Shanmuganathan; (penalty shoot-out scored) Amin	4–2	(penalty shoot-out missed) Abbas; (penalty shoot-out scored) Sarwar; (penalty shoot-out scored) Wasim; (penalty shoot-out missed) Mudassar

Busan, South Korea

Stadium: Gangseo Hockey Stadium

=== 2003 ===
==== 2003 Series – Malaysia ====
17 March 2003
Test match

Malaysia	3 – 5	Pakistan
	Report	Jawad 6', 32'; Abbas 22', 41'; Mudassar 50'

Kuala Lumpur, Malaysia

Stadium: Malaysia National Hockey Stadium

18 March 2003
Test match

Malaysia	1 – 4	Pakistan
Kuhan 39'	Report	Abbas 2', 31'; Jawad 21'; Aqil 69'

Kuala Lumpur, Malaysia

Stadium: Malaysia National Hockey Stadium

20 March 2003
Test match

Malaysia	0 – 1	Pakistan
	Report	Jawad 40'

Ipoh, Malaysia

Stadium: Azlan Shah Stadium

==== 2003 Sultan Azlan Shah Cup ====
22 March 2003
Pool stage

Pakistan	6 – 1	New Zealand
Jawad 9', 58'; Saqlain 27'; Shabbir 38'; Abbas 43'; Butt 51'	Report	Shaw 33'

Ipoh, Malaysia

Stadium: Azlan Shah Stadium

23 March 2003
Pool stage

Germany	4 – 3	Pakistan
Landshut 8'; Biederlack 22'; Weß 34'; Köpp 57'	Report	Abbas 25'; Jawad 42'; Butt 65'

Ipoh, Malaysia

Stadium: Azlan Shah Stadium

26 March 2003
Pool stage

Pakistan	3 – 1	Malaysia
Raza 2'; Abbas 3', 57'	Report	Norazlan 50'

Ipoh, Malaysia

Stadium: Azlan Shah Stadium

28 March 2003
Final

South Korea	0 – 1	Pakistan
	Report	Abbas 4'

Ipoh, Malaysia

Stadium: Azlan Shah Stadium

30 March 2003

Germany	0 - 1	Pakistan
	Report	Shabbir 62'

Ipoh, Malaysia

Event: 2003 Sultan Azlan Shah Cup
Final

==== Tri Nation Tournament ====
28 May 2003
Match 1

Australia	3 – 0	Pakistan
Livermore 14'; Elder 29'; Eglington 61'	Report

Perth, Australia

Stadium: Commonwealth Hockey Stadium

31 May 2003
Match 2

Pakistan	0 – 2	India
	Report	Baljit 18'; Prabjhot 55'

Perth, Australia

Stadium: Commonwealth Hockey Stadium

5 June 2003
Match 3

Australia	4 – 3	Pakistan
Taylor 8'; Dwyer 29', 54', 58'	Report	Shabbir 9'; Mudassar 39'; Abbasi 48'

Wollongong, Australia

Stadium: Wollongong Hockey Centre

7 June 2003
Match 4

Pakistan	4 – 4	India
Raza 10'; Saqlain 39'; Jawad 54'; Shabbir 60'	Report	Baljit 6', 6'; Prabhjot 30'; Jugraj 54'

Wollongong, Australia

Stadium: Wollongong Hockey Centre

==== 2003 Series – China ====
13 July 2003
Test match

Pakistan	6 – 2	China
Jawad 2', 57', 66'; Saqlain 45', 55'; Hussain 62'	Report	Xi Shang 7'; Yi 60'

Karachi, Pakistan

Stadium: Hockey Club of Pakistan

16 July 2003
Test match

Pakistan	7 – 0	China
Ali 15', 48', 62'; Butt 29'; Khalid 64', 65'; Shafiq 66'	Report

Karachi, Pakistan

Stadium: Hockey Club of Pakistan

==== 2003 Unofficial match – Netherlands ====
12 August 2003
Practice match

Netherlands	4 – 4	Pakistan
Reckers 13'; Mahieu 45'; Weusthof 51', 61'	Report	Abbas 19', 38'; Nadeem 33'; Saleem 52'

Amstelveen, Netherlands

Stadium: Wagener Stadium

==== 2003 International match – Netherlands ====
13 August 2003
Test match

Netherlands	5 – 2	Pakistan
Brouwer 8', 55'; Klaver 28'; Taekema 34', 51'	Report	Jawad 17'; Abbas 70'

Amstelveen, Netherlands

Stadium: Wagener Stadium

==== 2003 Hockey Champions Trophy ====
16 August 2003
Pool stage

Pakistan	4 – 4	Australia
Mudassar 6'; Abbas 11', 31'; Khalid 63'	Report	Schubert 14', 70'; Elder 32'; Butler 64'

Amstelveen, Netherlands

Stadium: Wagener Stadium

17 August 2003
Pool stage

Argentina	5 – 6	Pakistan
Vila 33'; Almada 36'; Cammareri 45'; Lombi 56', 61'	Report	Abbas 7', 11'; Shabbir 14', 25'; Jawad 39'; Butt 69'

Amstelveen, Netherlands

Stadium: Wagener Stadium

19 August 2003
Pool stage

Netherlands	2 – 2	Pakistan
de Nooijer 5'; Taekema 59'	Report	Abbas 27'; Jawad 64'

Amstelveen, Netherlands

Stadium: Wagener Stadium

21 August 2003
Pool stage

Pakistan	5 – 2	Germany
Jawad 5', 25'; Butt 15'; Abbas 65'; Khalid 68'	Report	Sperling 42'; Köpp 46'

Amstelveen, Netherlands

Stadium: Wagener Stadium

22 August 2003
Pool stage

India	7 – 4	Pakistan
Jugraj 24', 35'; Thakur 50', 65'; Prabhjot 54'; Gagan Ajit 60', 62'	Report	Butt 18'; Nadeem 20'; Mudassar 28'; Abbas 42'

Amstelveen, Netherlands

Stadium: Wagener Stadium

24 August 2003
Third and fourth place

Pakistan	4 – 3	India
Abbas 31', 61'; Jawad 42'; Butt 68'	Report	J. Singh 26'; P. Singh 35'; Thakur 48'

Amstelveen, Netherlands

Stadium: Wagener Stadium

==== 2003 Hockey Asia Cup ====
21 September 2003
Pool stage

Pakistan	8 – 0	Bangladesh
Mudassar 9'; Jawad 21', 46', 61'; Abbas 26', 62'; Nadeem 36'; Butt 64'	Report

Kuala Lumpur, Malaysia

Stadium: Malaysia National Hockey Stadium

22 September 2003
Pool stage

Pakistan	7 – 1	China
Khalid 18'; Nadeem 21', 45'; Abbas 32', 60'; Jawad 53', 62'	Report	Peng 34'

Kuala Lumpur, Malaysia

Stadium: Malaysia National Hockey Stadium

24 September 2003
Pool stage

Pakistan	4 – 2	India
Jawad 11'; Abbasi 21'; Ahmed 60'; Abbas 68'	Report	Thakur 25'; Michael 35'

Kuala Lumpur, Malaysia

Stadium: Malaysia National Hockey Stadium

26 September 2003
Semifinal

Pakistan	3 – 1	Japan
Shabbir 27'; Ghazanfar 41'; Nadeem 57'	Report	Furusato 39'

Kuala Lumpur, Malaysia

Stadium: Malaysia National Hockey Stadium

28 September 2003
Final

India	4 – 2	Pakistan
Kanwalpreet 6'; G. Singh 16'; Tirkey 68'; Prabhjot 69'	Report	Abbas 6', 13'

Kuala Lumpur, Malaysia

Stadium: Malaysia National Hockey Stadium

==== 2003 Afro–Asian Games ====
23 October 2003
Pool stage

Pakistan	4 – 3	Nigeria
Ghazanfar 4'; Raza 26'; Saleem 35', 66'	Report	Lamido 11'; Jatau 52'; Ogodogu 65'

Hyderabad, India

Stadium: Gawchibowli Hockey Stadium

25 October 2003
Pool stage

Pakistan	3 – 1	Egypt
Butt 9'; Abbasi 39'; Ghazanfar 43'	Report	Metwally 66'

Hyderabad, India

Stadium: Gawchibowli Hockey Stadium

27 October 2003
Pool stage

India	4 – 2	Pakistan
Michael 24'; Prabhjot 40'; G. Singh 42', 70'	Report	Saleem 34'; Imran 35'

Hyderabad, India

Stadium: Gawchibowli Hockey Stadium

29 October 2003
Semifinal

South Korea	0 – 2	Pakistan
	Report	Ghazanfar 34'; Abbasi 60'

Hyderabad, India

Stadium: Gawchibowli Hockey Stadium

31 October 2003

India	3 – 1	Pakistan
Halappa 7'; Aiyappa 34'; G. Singh 61'	Report	Ghazanfar 13'

Hyderabad, India

Stadium: Gawchibowli Hockey Stadium

==== 2003 Series – Malaysia ====
13 December 2003
Test match

Pakistan	3 – 1	Malaysia
Abbasi 15', 29'; Khalid 34'	Report	Shanmuganathan 14'

Karachi, Pakistan

Stadium: Hockey Club of Pakistan

14 December 2003
Test match

Pakistan	4 – 1	Malaysia
Abbas 12', 24'; Khalid 20'; Mudassar 42'	Report	Misron 51'

Karachi, Pakistan

Stadium: Hockey Club of Pakistan

=== 2004 ===
==== 2004 Sultan Azlan Shah Cup ====
8 January 2004
Pool stage

South Korea	2 – 4	Pakistan
Seo 35'; Lee J. 43'	Report	Butt 14', 42'; Nadeem 39'; Shabbir 68'

Kuala Lumpur, Malaysia

Stadium: Malaysia National Hockey Stadium

9 January 2004
Pool stage

Pakistan	3 – 2	India
Abbas 13', 27', 51'	Report	Baljit 15'; Rajpal 18'

Kuala Lumpur, Malaysia

Stadium: Malaysia National Hockey Stadium

11 January 2004
Pool stage

Pakistan	4 – 2	Spain
Shabbir 6'; Jawad 17', 45', 66'	Report	Amat 43'; Ribas 62'

Kuala Lumpur, Malaysia

Stadium: Malaysia National Hockey Stadium

12 January 2004
Pool stage

Germany	3 – 4	Pakistan
Witthaus 34'; Köpp 45'; Michel 53'	Report	Abbas 42', 51', 59'; Nadeem 65'

Kuala Lumpur, Malaysia

Stadium: Malaysia National Hockey Stadium

14 January 2004
Pool stage

Pakistan	1 – 1	Malaysia
Abbas 48'	Report	Shanmuganathan 43'

Kuala Lumpur, Malaysia

Stadium: Malaysia National Hockey Stadium

15 January 2004
Pool stage

Australia	2 – 2	Pakistan
De Young 13'; Boyce 54'	Report	Abbas 37'; Saleem 51'

Kuala Lumpur, Malaysia

Stadium: Malaysia National Hockey Stadium

18 January 2004
Final

Pakistan	3 – 4	Australia
Jawad 30'; Abbas 44', 65'	Report	Brooks 21', 29'; Boyce 32'; Elder 57'

Kuala Lumpur, Malaysia

Stadium: Malaysia National Hockey Stadium

==== 2004 Olympic Qualifiers ====
2 March 2004
Pool stage

Pakistan	4 – 2	Canada
Abbas 38', 51'; Jawad 40'; Abbasi 58'	Report	Pereira 68'; Wettlaufer 70'

Madrid, Spain

Stadium: Club de Campo

4 March 2004
Pool stage

Belgium	0 – 2	Pakistan
	Report	Jawad 50'; Saqlain 61'

Madrid, Spain

Stadium: Club de Campo

6 March 2004
Pool stage

Pakistan	5 – 3	India
Abbas 2', 28', 41', 62'; Butt 34'	Report	Thakur 33'; G. Singh 42', 44'

Madrid, Spain

Stadium: Club de Campo

8 March 2004
Pool stage

Malaysia	0 – 0	Pakistan
	Report

Madrid, Spain

Stadium: Club de Campo

9 March 2004
Pool stage

New Zealand	1 – 4	Pakistan
Shaw 21'	Report	Abbas 25', 35'; Mudassar 41'; Shabbir 43'

Madrid, Spain

Stadium: Club de Campo

11 March 2004
Semifinal

Pakistan	2 – 3	Spain
Abbasi 30'; Mudassar 67'	Report	Tubau 14', 39'; Freixa 68'

Madrid, Spain

Stadium: Club de Campo

13 March 2004
Third and fourth place

India	2 – 4	Pakistan
Prabhjot 22'; G. Singh 59'	Report	Shabbir 15'; Abbas 43'; Abbasi 55'; Jawad 69'

Madrid, Spain

Stadium: Club de Campo

==== Tri Nations Tournament ====
6 June 2004
Match 1

Pakistan	2 – 1	Australia
Abbas 42'; Aziz 57'	Report	Brooks 34'

Cannock, United Kingdom

Stadium: Cannock Hockey Club

7 June 2004
Match 2

Great Britain	3 – 2	Pakistan
Fordham 58'; Hawes 60', 66'	Report	Abbas 16'; Jawad 35'

Cannock, England

Stadium: Cannock Hockey Club

10 June 2004
Match 3

Pakistan	3 – 2	Australia
Abbas 28', 57'; Abbasi 43'	Report	George 33'; Eglington 62'

Nottingham, United Kingdom

Stadium: Highfields Sports Club

11 June 2004
Match 4

Great Britain	2 – 1	Pakistan
Goudie 38'; Bertram 56'	Report	Jawad 45'

Nottingham, United Kingdom

Stadium: Highfields Sports Club

==== 2004 Series – Germany ====
13 June 2004
Test match

Germany	3 – 1	Pakistan
Reinelt 16'; Zeller 19'; Witthaus 68'	Report	Abbas 11'

Berlin, Germany

Stadium: Olympic Hockeystadion

14 June 2004
Test match

Germany	2 – 1	Pakistan
Witthaus 30'; Scharowsky 55'	Report	Abbas 65'

Berlin, Germany

Stadium: Sports Club Charlottenburg

==== 2004 Hamburg Masters ====
18 June 2004
Match 1

Pakistan	1 – 1	South Korea
Abbas 39'	Report	Lee J. 67'

Hamburg, Germany

Stadium: Uhlenhorster HC

19 June 2004
Match 2

Pakistan	6 – 3	Argentina
Nadeem 16', 57', 59'; Ahmed 28'; Butt 34'; Abbas 50'	Report	Cammareri 11'; Lombi 47'; Retegui 63'

Hamburg, Germany

Stadium: Uhlenhorster HC

20 June 2004
Match 3

Germany	3 – 2	Pakistan
Bechmann 30'; Emmerling 62'; Kunz 70'	Report	Nadeem 35'; Abbas 46'

Hamburg, Germany

Stadium: Uhlenhorster HC

==== 2004 Hockey RaboTrophy ====
26 June 2004
Pool stage

Pakistan	0 – 6	Germany
	Report	Witthaus 12'; Michel 22', 33'; Kunz 51', 57'; Bechmann 67'

Amstelveen, Netherlands

Stadium: Wagener Stadium

29 June 2004
Pool stage

Pakistan	6 – 1	India
Abbasi 7'; Abbas 28', 43'; Shabbir 33'; Jawad 55'; Nadeem 64'	Report	Deepak 32'

Amstelveen, Netherlands

Stadium: Wagener Stadium

1 July 2004
Pool stage

Netherlands	3 – 2	Pakistan
de Nooijer 5'; Klaver 41'; Brouwer 69'	Report	Ghazanfar 50'; Hussain 56'

Amstelveen, Netherlands

Stadium: Wagener Stadium

3 July 2004
Third and fourth place

Pakistan	5 – 3	India
Jawad 7', 57', 68'; Butt 26', 65'	Report	Tirkey 14'; Baljit 47'; G. Singh 49'

Amstelveen, Netherlands

Stadium: Wagener Stadium

==== Tri Nations Tournament ====
31 July 2004
Match 1

Pakistan	2 – 2	Argentina
Butt 17'; Abbas 53'	Report

Alcalá la Real, Spain

Stadium: Alcalá Hockey Club

1 August 2004
Match 2

Spain	1 – 3	Pakistan
Cutal 10'	Report	Abbas 3', 50'; Jawad 65'

Alcalá la Real, Spain

Stadium: Alcalá Hockey Club

==== 2004 Summer Olympics ====
15 August 2004
Pool stage

Germany	2 – 1	Pakistan
Emmerling 7'; Michel 31'	Report	Butt 43'

Athens, Greece

Stadium: Hellinikon Olympic Hockey Centre

17 August 2004
Pool stage

Egypt	0 – 7	Pakistan
	Report	Jawad 3', 12'; Nadeem 15'; Abbas 30', 34', 38', 58'

Athens, Greece

Stadium: Hellinikon Olympic Hockey Centre

19 August 2004
Pool stage

Pakistan	3 – 0	South Korea
Butt 43'; Abbasi 56'; Abbas 66'	Report

Athens, Greece

Stadium: Hellinikon Olympic Hockey Centre

21 August 2004
Pool stage

Spain	4 – 0	Pakistan
Tubau 6', 35', 41'; Freixa 63'	Report

Athens, Greece

Stadium: Hellinikon Olympic Hockey Centre

23 August 2004
Pool stage

Pakistan	8 – 3	Great Britain
Abbas 9', 39'; Ali 35+'; Nadeem 37'; Butt 55', 68'; Abbasi 59'; Shabbir 60'	Report	Stott 5'; Hall 65'

Athens, Greece

Stadium: Hellinikon Olympic Hockey Centre

25 August 2004
Crossover

Pakistan	3 – 0	India
Aziz 43'; Abbas 59'; Shabbir 68'	Report

Athens, Greece

Stadium: Hellinikon Olympic Hockey Centre

27 August 2004
Fifth and sixth place

New Zealand	2 – 4	Pakistan
Brooks 16'; Smith 35'	Report	Abbas 35', 47', 68'; Jawad 55'

Athens, Greece

Stadium: Hellinikon Olympic Hockey Centre

==== 2004 Series – India ====
24 September 2004
Test match

Pakistan	2 – 1	India
Abbas 17'; Butt 26'	Report	Halappa 3'

Karachi, Pakistan

Stadium: Hockey Club of Pakistan

27 September 2004
Test match

Pakistan	1 – 4	India
Abbas 69'	Report	Sandeep 13', 17'; Tirkey 33'; Khandekar 60'

Quetta, Pakistan

Stadium: Musa Khan Stadium

29 September 2004
Test match

Pakistan	3 – 2	India
Mudassar 15'; Abbasi 25'; Abbas 67'	Report	Prasad 48'; Halappa 60'

Peshawar, Pakistan

Stadium: Lala Ayub Hockey Stadium

1 October 2004
Test match

Pakistan	4 – 4	India
Abbas 14', 42'; Ali 57'; Butt 67'	Report	Pillay 15'; Sandeep 39'; Halappa 49'; Tirkey 51'

Lahore, Pakistan

Stadium: National Hockey Stadium

4 October 2004
Test match

India	1 – 3	Pakistan
Michael 50'	Report	Jawad 6'; Abbas 29', 64'

New Delhi, India

Stadium: Major Dhyan Chand National Stadium

6 October 2004
Test match

India	1 – 1	Pakistan
Tirkey 33'	Report	Ghazanfar 22'

Chandigarh, India

Stadium: Sector 42 Hockey Stadium

8 October 2004
Test match

India	1 – 2	Pakistan
Halappa 48'	Report	Abbas 8'; Butt 47'

Amritsar, India

Stadium: Guru Nanak Dev University Stadium

10 October 2004
Test match

India	2 – 0	Pakistan
Michael 17'; Khandekar 21'	Report

Hyderabad, India

Stadium: Gachibowli Hockey Stadium

==== 2004 Hockey Champions Trophy ====
4 December 2004
Pool stage

Pakistan	3 – 1	Germany
Abbas 34'; Abbasi 52'; Jawad 64'	Report	Montag 40'

Lahore, Pakistan

Stadium: National Hockey Stadium

5 December 2004
Pool stage

New Zealand	1 – 3	Pakistan
Archibald 39'	Report	Abbasi 49'; Abbas 53', 55'

Lahore, Pakistan

Stadium: National Hockey Stadium

7 December 2004
Pool stage

Pakistan	1 – 4	Netherlands
Abbas 19'	Report	R. Brouwer 15'; Taekema 39'; Klaver 65'; Delmee 68'

Lahore, Pakistan

Stadium: National Hockey Stadium

8 December 2004
Pool stage

Pakistan	2 – 1	India
Saqlain 32'; Abbas 66'	Report	Sandeep 57'

Lahore, Pakistan

Stadium: National Hockey Stadium

10 December 2004
Pool stage

Spain	3 – 0	Pakistan
Fàbregas 47'; D. Alegre 53'; Freixa 69'	Report

Lahore, Pakistan

Stadium: National Hockey Stadium

12 December 2004
Third and fourth place

Pakistan	3 – 2	India
Abbas 4'; Butt 27'; Mudassar 54'	Report	Sandeep 2', 65'

Lahore, Pakistan

Stadium: National Hockey Stadium
