= 2001 Sultan Azlan Shah Cup =

Field hockey tournament

Tournament details
- Host country: Malaysia
- City: Kuala Lumpur
- Teams: 7
- Venue: Azlan Shah Stadium

Final positions
- Champions: Germany (2nd title)
- Runner-up: South Korea
- Third place: Australia

Tournament statistics
- Matches played: 24
- Goals scored: 116 (4.83 per match)
- Top scorer: (Pakistan) Sohail Abbas (10 goals)

The 2001 Sultan Azlan Shah Cup was the 11th edition of field hockey tournament the Sultan Azlan Shah Cup.

== Participating nations ==
Seven countries participated in the tournament:

- Australia
- England
- Germany
- India
- Malaysia
- Pakistan
- South Korea

== Results ==
=== Preliminary round ===
Pos	Team	Pld	W	D	L	GF	GA	GD	Pts	Qualification
1	Germany	6	6	0	0	25	9	+16	18	Final
2	South Korea	6	4	1	1	16	8	+8	13	Final
3	Australia	6	3	1	2	18	16	+2	10	Third Place Match
4	Pakistan	6	3	1	2	20	21	−1	10	Third Place Match
5	India	6	1	1	4	9	15	−6	4	Fifth Place Match
6	England	6	0	2	4	6	11	−5	2	Fifth Place Match
7	Malaysia	6	0	2	4	8	22	−14	2	

Source: Rediff
Rules for classification: 1) points; 2) goal difference; 3) goals scored; 4) head-to-head result.

==== Fixtures ====
2 August 2001
16:05

Australia	5–3	Pakistan
M. Smith 10', 49'; McCann 17'; Elder 38', 44'	Report	Abbas 13'; Bashir 51'; Nadeem 66'

2 August 2001
18:05

South Korea	2–0	England
Yeo 14'; Hwang 47'	Report

2 August 2001
20:05

Malaysia	2–2	India
Madzli 11'; Maninderjit 57'	Report	Tirkey 32'; Baljit 63'

3 August 2001
16:05

Pakistan	2–2	South Korea
Nadeem 10'; Abbas 40'	Report	Yoo M. 7'; Seo 22'

3 August 2001
18:05

India	0–2	Germany
	Report	Domke 3'; Weß 61'

3 August 2001
20:05

England	0–0	Malaysia
	Report

4 August 2001
18:05

Germany	6–2	Australia
Michel 4', 44'; Domke 28', 56'; Witthaus 31'; Mülders 60'	Report	Elder 24', 47'

5 August 2001
16:05

Australia	1–1	England
Taylor 24'	Report	Parnham 33'

5 August 2001
18:05

Pakistan	4–3	India
Jawwad 18', 36'; Shabbir 27'; Abbas 60'	Report	Baljit 28'; Deepak 32'; Jugraj 54'

5 August 2001
20:05

Malaysia	1–4	South Korea
Zhaffan 48'	Report	Yeo 25'; Hwang 26'; Kim J. 54', 58'

6 August 2001
18:05

England	3–4	Pakistan
Hall 25', 63'; Bertram 68'	Report	Abbas 5', 60'; Jawwad 30'; Sarwar 43'

6 August 2001
20:05

Germany	5–1	Malaysia
Michel 16', 20', 43', 65'; Domke 60'	Report	Chairil 68'

7 August 2001
18:05

South Korea	2–5	Germany
Yeo 26'; Kim K. 42'	Report	Michel 33', 38', 70'; Kunz 58'; Reinelt 64'

7 August 2001
20:05

India	2–3	Australia
Deepak 14', 64'	Report	Dwyer 17'; M. Smith 37'; Elder 70'

8 August 2001
16:05

England	1–2	India
Hall 51'	Report	Baljit 13'; Deepak 67'

8 August 2001
18:05

Malaysia	3–4	Pakistan
Maninderjit 23'; Kuhan 37'; Krishnamurthy 50'	Report	Abbas 7', 62', 62'; Bashir 66'

8 August 2001
20:05

South Korea	3–0	Australia
Hwang 6', 11'; Kim J. 65'	Report

9 August 2001
18:05

Pakistan	3–5	Germany
Jawwad 4', 40'; Abbas 32'	Report	Domke 3', 28'; Reinelt 9'; Kunz 19'; Weß 21'

10 August 2001
16:05

Germany	2–1	England
Witthaus 31'; Domke 46'	Report	Pearn 18'

10 August 2001
18:05

India	0–3	South Korea
	Report	Sin 32'; Song 37'; Yeo 45'

10 August 2001
20:05

Australia	7–1	Malaysia
Commens 21'; Dwyer 32'; Elder 37', 40', 55'; Taylor 46'; McCann 47'	Report	Logan 17'

=== Classification round ===
==== Fifth and sixth place ====
12 August 2001
08:05

India	2–0	England
Tejbir 21'; Tirkey 30'	Report

==== Third and fourth place ====
12 August 2001
17:05

Australia	4–3	Pakistan
Elder 8'; Taylor 11'; Davis 35'; Dwyer 50'	Report	Khalid 15', 64'; Abbas 51'

==== Final ====
12 August 2001
19:35

Germany	3–2	South Korea
Hentschel 30'; Kunz 53'; Eimer 63'	Report	Song 9'; Kim K. 31'

== Statistics ==
=== Final standings ===
Pos	Team	Pld	W	D	L	GF	GA	GD	Pts	Qualification
1st place, gold medalist(s)	Germany	7	7	0	0	28	11	+17	21	Gold Medal
2nd place, silver medalist(s)	South Korea	7	4	1	2	18	11	+7	13	Silver Medal
3rd place, bronze medalist(s)	Australia	7	4	1	2	22	19	+3	13	Bronze Medal
4	Pakistan	7	3	1	3	23	25	−2	10	
5	India	7	2	1	4	11	15	−4	7	
6	England	7	0	2	5	6	13	−7	2	
7	Malaysia	6	0	2	4	8	22	−14	2	

Source: Rediff

=== Goalscorers ===
There were 116 goals scored in 24 matches, for an average of 4.83 goals per match.

10 goals

- (Pakistan) Sohail Abbas

9 goals

- (Australia) Troy Elder
- (Germany) Björn Michel

7 goals

- (Germany) Oliver Domke

5 goals

- (Pakistan) Kashif Jawwad

4 goals

- (India) Deepak Thakur
- (South Korea) Hwang Jong-Hyun
- (South Korea) Yeo Woon-Kon

3 goals

- (Australia) Jamie Dwyer
- (Australia) Matthew Smith
- (Australia) Benjamin Taylor
- (England) Daniel Hall
- (Germany) Florian Kunz
- (India) Baljit Singh Dhillon
- (South Korea) Kim Jung-Chul

2 goals

- (Australia) Michael McCann
- (Germany) Sascha Reinelt
- (Germany) Timo Weß
- (Germany) Matthias Witthaus
- (India) Dilip Tirkey
- (Malaysia) Maninderjit Singh
- (Pakistan) Atif Bashir
- (Pakistan) Muhammad Khalid
- (Pakistan) Muhammad Nadeem
- (South Korea) Kim Kyung-Seok
- (South Korea) Song Seung-Tae

1 goal

- (Australia) Adam Commens
- (Australia) Gavin Davis
- (England) Thomas Bertram
- (England) Craig Parnham
- (England) Mark Pearn
- (Germany) Christoph Eimer
- (Germany) Tobias Hentschel
- (Germany) Jamilon Mülders
- (India) Jugraj Singh
- (India) Tejbir Singh
- (Malaysia) Chairil Anwar
- (Malaysia) Krishnamurthy Gobinathan
- (Malaysia) Madzli Ikmar
- (Malaysia) Zhaffan Mat Radzi
- (Malaysia) Logan Raj
- (Malaysia) Kuhan Shanmuganathan
- (Pakistan) Muhammad Sarwar
- (Pakistan) Muhammad Shabbir
- (South Korea) Seo Jong-Ho
- (South Korea) Yoo Moon-Ki
- (South Korea) Sin Seok-Gyo
