= Field hockey at the 2002 Asian Games – Men's tournament =

Men at the 2002 Asian Games
- Venue: Gangseo Hockey Stadium
- Date: 30 September 2002 – 12 October 2002
- Competitors: 126 from 8 nations

Medalists
gold medal	South Korea
silver medal	India
bronze medal	Malaysia

The men's field hockey tournament at the 2002 Asian Games was held in Gangseo Hockey Stadium, Busan, South Korea, from September 30 to October 12, 2002. The hosts won the gold medal.

== Squads ==
Bangladesh	China	Hong Kong	India
Yamin Hossain; Shamsuddin Tuhin; Ashraful Islam; Rasel Khan Bappi; Md Ashiquzzaman; Ariful Haq Prince; Shahidullah Khokon; Mirajul Ahsan; Moududur Rahman Shuvo; Musa Mia; Maksud Alam; Shahidullah Titu; Zahidul Islam Rajon; Isa Mia; Hedayetul Islam Khan; Mahbubullah Chowdhury Shakil	Song Yi; Meng Lizhi; Hu Huiren; Ren Baode; Yu Yang; Li Yingwen; Yang Guangsen; Na Yubo; Guo Jie; Zhang Xiaohui; Liu Weitang; Lü Peng; Jiang Xishang; Su Rifeng	Akbar Ali; Arif Ali; Asif Ali; Asghar Ali; Tom Ayres; Harinder Singh Bal; Vincent Cheung; Jasbir Singh Chhina; Alfonso Cordero; Ishtiaq Khan; Jason Man; Christopher Marshall; Shafiq Iqbal Mirza; Swalikh Mohammed; Farooq Saeed; Satpal Singh	Devesh Chauhan; Bharat Chettri; Dilip Tirkey; Jugraj Singh; Kamalpreet Singh; Dinesh Nayak; Viren Rasquinha; Vikram Pillay; Ignace Tirkey; Bimal Lakra; Dhanraj Pillay; Deepak Thakur; Prabhjot Singh; Daljit Singh Dhillon; Gagan Ajit Singh; Tejbir Singh
Japan	Malaysia	Pakistan	South Korea
Toshiaki Fukuda; Kazuo Yoshida; Naoya Iwadate; Takahiko Yamahori; Akira Takahashi; Yasuhiro Nobui; Akihiko Hirata; Mitsuru Ito; Kenichi Katayama; Takiya Kawada; Yasuhiro Kikkawa; Hirofumi Miyoshi; Kazuyuki Ozawa; Atsushi Takehara; Takeshi Tamekuni; Naohiko Tobita	Chairil Anwar Abdul Aziz; Shaiful Azli; Chua Boon Huat; Roslan Jamaluddin; Keevan Raj Kali; Gobinathan Krishnamurthy; Rodzhanizam Mat Radzi; Megat Azrafiq Termizi; Azlan Misron; Mohd Madzli Ikmar; Redzuan Ponirin; Mohd Amin Rahim; Norazlan Rahim; Mohd Fairuz Ramli; Kuhan Shanmuganathan; Kumar Subramaniam	Muhammad Qasim; Ahmed Alam; Sohail Abbas; Tariq Imran; Zeeshan Ashraf; Muhammad Nadeem; Ghazanfar Ali; Muhammad Saqlain; Waseem Ahmed; Dilawar Hussain; Mudassar Ali Khan; Muhammad Sarwar; Kashif Jawad; Rehan Butt; Muhammad Shabbir; Khalid Salim	Kang Keon-wook; Shin Seok-kyo; Jeon Jong-ha; Kim Yong-bae; Ji Seung-hwan; Hwang Jong-hyun; Kim Jung-chul; Lim Jong-chun; Kim Kyung-seok; Kim Yoon; Yeo Woon-kon; Kang Seong-jung; Song Seung-tae; Kim Chul; Seo Jong-ho; Lee Nam-yong

== Results ==
All times are Korea Standard Time (UTC+09:00)

=== Preliminary ===
==== Group A ====
Team	Pld	W	D	L	GF	GA	GD	Pts
South Korea	3	2	1	0	19	2	+17	7
India	3	2	1	0	9	2	+7	7
Japan	3	1	0	2	4	10	−6	3
Hong Kong	3	0	0	3	5	23	−18	0

30 September
10:00

India	5–1	Hong Kong

Gangseo Hockey Stadium, Busan

30 September
12:30

Japan	0–4	South Korea

Gangseo Hockey Stadium, Busan

2 October
12:30

India	3–0	Japan

Gangseo Hockey Stadium, Busan

2 October
15:00

Hong Kong	1–14	South Korea

Gangseo Hockey Stadium, Busan

4 October
15:00

South Korea	1–1	India

Gangseo Hockey Stadium, Busan

6 October
10:00

Japan	4–3	Hong Kong

Gangseo Hockey Stadium, Busan

==== Group B ====
Team	Pld	W	D	L	GF	GA	GD	Pts
Pakistan	3	3	0	0	23	4	+19	9
Malaysia	3	2	0	1	10	9	+1	6
China	3	1	0	2	8	13	−5	3
Bangladesh	3	0	0	3	3	18	−15	0

30 September
15:30

Pakistan	8–3	China

Gangseo Hockey Stadium, Busan

2 October
10:00

Bangladesh	1–6	Malaysia

Gangseo Hockey Stadium, Busan

4 October
10:00

China	2–3	Malaysia

Gangseo Hockey Stadium, Busan

4 October
12:30

Bangladesh	0–9	Pakistan

Gangseo Hockey Stadium, Busan

6 October
12:30

Malaysia	1–6	Pakistan

Gangseo Hockey Stadium, Busan

6 October
15:00

Bangladesh	2–3	China

Gangseo Hockey Stadium, Busan

=== Classification (5–8) ===
Preliminary (5–8)
9 October
Japan	6
Bangladesh	1
9 October
China	3
Hong Kong	2

Classification (5–6)
11 October
Japan	2
China	3
Classification (7–8)
11 October
Bangladesh	3
Hong Kong	2

==== Preliminary (5–8) ====
9 October
10:00

Japan	6–1	Bangladesh

Gangseo Hockey Stadium, Busan

9 October
14:00

China	3–2	Hong Kong

Gangseo Hockey Stadium, Busan

==== Classification (7–8) ====
11 October
9:00

Bangladesh	3–2	Hong Kong

Gangseo Hockey Stadium, Busan

==== Classification (5–6) ====
11 October
12:30

Japan	2–3	China

Gangseo Hockey Stadium, Busan

=== Final round ===
Semi-finals
10 October
South Korea	2
Malaysia	0
10 October
Pakistan	3
India	4

Bronze medal match
12 October
South Korea	4
India	3
Final
12 October
Malaysia (p)	1 (4)
Pakistan	1 (2)

==== Semi-finals ====
10 October
11:00

South Korea	2–0	Malaysia

Gangseo Hockey Stadium, Busan

10 October
14:00

Pakistan	3–4	India
Abbas 10', 26'; Sh. Muhammad 63'	Report	Pillay 6', 21'; D. Singh 41'; GA Singh 67'

Gangseo Hockey Stadium, Busan
Umpires:
Murray Grime (AUS)

==== Bronze medal match ====
12 October
12:00

Malaysia	1–1 (a.e.t.)	Pakistan
Penalties
	4–2

Gangseo Hockey Stadium, Busan

==== Gold medal match ====
12 October
15:00

South Korea	4–3	India
Keon-wook 24'; Woon-kon 30', 68'; Seung-tae 44'	Report	J. Singh 48', 60'; GA Singh 53'

Gangseo Hockey Stadium, Busan
Umpires:
Colin Hutchinson (IRE)

== Final standing ==
Rank	Team	Pld	W	D	L
1st place, gold medalist(s)	South Korea	5	4	1	0
2nd place, silver medalist(s)	India	5	3	1	1
3rd place, bronze medalist(s)	Malaysia	5	2	1	2
4	Pakistan	5	3	1	1
5	China	5	3	0	2
6	Japan	5	2	0	3
7	Bangladesh	5	1	0	4
8	Hong Kong	5	0	0	5
