= 2000 Sultan Azlan Shah Cup =

Field hockey tournament

Tournament details
- Host country: Malaysia
- City: Kuala Lumpur
- Teams: 7
- Venue: Azlan Shah Stadium

Final positions
- Champions: Pakistan (2nd title)
- Runner-up: South Korea
- Third place: India

Tournament statistics
- Matches played: 24
- Goals scored: 95 (3.96 per match)
- Top scorer: (South Korea) Yeo Woon-kon (7 goals)
- Best player: (South Korea) Yeo Woon-kon
- Best young player: (Malaysia) Ibrahim Suhaimi

The 2000 Sultan Azlan Shah Cup was the tenth edition of field hockey tournament the Sultan Azlan Shah Cup held in Kuala Lumpur, Malaysia. Pakistan won their successive second title after beating South Korea 1-0 with a late minute goal by Kamran Ashraf in the final becoming the first side to retain the Azlan Shah Cup since its inaugural edition. Pakistan's captain and goalkeeper Ahmed Alam was voted as player of the tournament.

== Participating nations ==
Seven countries participated in the tournament:

- Canada
- Malaysia
- Pakistan
- New Zealand
- South Korea
- India
- Germany

== Results ==
=== Preliminary round ===
==== Standings ====
Pos	Team	Pld	W	D	L	GF	GA	GD	Pts	Qualification
1	South Korea	6	5	1	0	17	8	+9	16	Final
2	Pakistan	6	5	1	0	15	8	+7	16	Final
3	Malaysia (H)	6	3	0	3	16	14	+2	9	Third place match
4	India	6	3	0	3	10	10	0	9	Third place match
5	Germany	6	2	1	3	10	14	−4	7	Fifth place match
6	New Zealand	6	0	2	4	8	16	−8	2	Fifth place match
7	Canada	6	0	1	5	8	14	−6	1	

Source: Field Hockey Canada
Rules for classification: 1) points; 2) goal difference; 3) goals scored; 4) head-to-head result.
(H) Hosts

==== Fixtures ====
16 February 2000
16:05

India	1–2	Germany
Pillay 18'	Report	Wein 1'; Bechmann 9'

16 February 2000
18:05

Malaysia	3–1	Canada
Ibrahim 2', 29', 69'	Report	Milkovich 32'

16 February 2000
20:05

New Zealand	1–4	South Korea
Russ 3'	Report	Yeo 39', 53'; Song 60', 68'

17 February 2000
16:05

Germany	1–2	Malaysia
Bechmann 39'	Report	Kuhan 33', 67'

17 February 2000
18:05

South Korea	1–1	Pakistan
Yeo 16'	Report	Bashir 33'

17 February 2000
20:05

Canada	1–1	New Zealand
Short 20'	Report	Reynolds 35'

18 February 2000
18:05

Pakistan	2–1	India
Raza 7'; Jawwad 28'	Report	Baljit 52'

19 February 2000
16:05

New Zealand	2–4	Malaysia
Archibald 19'; Russ 68'	Report	Chairil 3', 7'; Saiful 43'; Ibrahim 53'

19 February 2000
18:05

India	3–2	Canada
Pillay 7', 37'; Deepak 33'	Report	Short 6'; Kullar 53'

19 February 2000
20:05

Germany	0–3	South Korea
	Report	Song 13', 50'; Kang Ky. 25'

20 February 2000
18:05

New Zealand	1–3	Pakistan
Parag 12'	Report	Raza 23'; Bashir 29'; Yousuf 33'

20 February 2000
20:05

Germany	3–2	Canada
Bechmann 7'; Domke 43', 53'	Report	Short 18'; Kullar 51'

21 February 2000
18:05

India	1–2	South Korea
Baljit 53'	Report	Ji 25'; Yeo 42'

21 February 2000
20:05

Malaysia	2–3	Pakistan
Chua 58'; Kuhan 60'	Report	Yousuf 5', 63'; Ashraf 13'

22 February 2000
16:05

South Korea	2–1	Canada
Kim Ky. 5'; Hwang 8'	Report	Milkovich 24'

22 February 2000
18:05

Germany	2–2	New Zealand
Domke 50'; Kunz 61'	Report	Leaver 7'; Burrows 46'

22 February 2000
20:05

Malaysia	1–2	India
Ibrahim 11'	Report	Baljit 19'; Deepak 32'

23 February 2000
18:05

Pakistan	4–2	Germany
Ashraf 15'; Jawwad 29'; Yousuf 54'; Bashir 57'	Report	Kunz 7'; Crone 52'

24 February 2000
16:05

Canada	1–2	Pakistan
Campbell 25'	Report	Yousuf 34'; Sarwar 50'

24 February 2000
18:05

South Korea	5–4	Malaysia
Yeo 10', 33', 67'; Seo J. 25'; Kang Ke. 51'	Report	Kuhan 19', 21'; Chairil 48', 56'

24 February 2000
20:05

New Zealand	1–2	India
Parag 22'	Report	Deepak 26'; Pillay 28'

=== Classification round ===
==== Fifth and sixth place ====
26 February 2000
08:05

Germany	3–2 (a.e.t.)	New Zealand
Witthaus 20'; Emmerling 56'; Keller 85'	Report	Burrows 32'; Smith 52'

==== Third and fourth place ====
26 February 2000
17:05

Malaysia	1–4	India
Kuhan 3'	Report	Baljit 6', 67'; Pillay 17'; Tirkey 54'

==== Final ====
26 February 2000
19:35

South Korea	0–1	Pakistan
	Report	Ashraf 70'

Umpires:
Marcello Servetto (ARG)
Blaise Monteiro (IND)

== Awards ==
The following awards were presented at the conclusion of the tournament:

Top Goalscorer	Player of the Tournament	Player of the Final	Fair Play Trophy	Most Promising Player
(South Korea) Yeo Woon-kon	(South Korea) Yeo Woon-kon	(Pakistan) Ahmed Alam	India	(Malaysia) Ibrahim Suhaimi

== Final standings ==
As per statistical convention in field hockey, matches decided in regular time are counted as wins and losses, while matches decided by penalty shoot-outs are counted as draws.

Pos	Team	Pld	W	D	L	GF	GA	GD	Pts	Final result
1	Pakistan	7	6	1	0	16	8	+8	19	Gold medal
2	South Korea	7	5	1	1	17	9	+8	16	Silver medal
3	India	7	4	0	3	14	11	+3	12	Bronze medal
4	Malaysia (H)	7	3	0	4	17	18	−1	9	
5	Germany	7	3	1	3	13	16	−3	10	
6	New Zealand	7	0	2	5	10	19	−9	2	
7	Canada	6	0	1	5	8	14	−6	1	

Source: Field Hockey Canada
(H) Hosts

== Goalscorers ==
There were 95 goals scored in 24 matches, for an average of 3.96 goals per match.

7 goals

- (South Korea) Yeo Woon-kon

6 goals

- (Malaysia) Kuhan Shanmuganathan

5 goals

- (India) Dhanraj Pillay
- (India) Baljit Singh Dhillon
- (Malaysia) Ibrahim Suhaimi
- (Pakistan) Imran Yousuf

4 goals

- (Malaysia) Chairil Anwar Abdul Aziz
- (South Korea) Song Seung-tae

3 goals

- (Canada) Robert Short
- (Germany) Christoph Bechmann
- (Germany) Oliver Domke
- (India) Deepak Thakur
- (Pakistan) Kamran Ashraf
- (Pakistan) Atif Bashir

2 goals

- (Canada) Bindi Kullar
- (Canada) Peter Milkovich
- (Germany) Florian Kunz
- (New Zealand) Phillip Burrows
- (New Zealand) Umesh Parag
- (New Zealand) Craig Russ
- (Pakistan) Kashif Jawwad
- (Pakistan) Ali Raza

1 goal

- (Canada) Sean Campbell
- (Germany) Philipp Crone
- (Germany) Björn Emmerling
- (Germany) Florian Keller
- (Germany) Christian Wein
- (Germany) Matthias Witthaus
- (India) Dilip Tirkey
- (Malaysia) Saiful Azli bin Abdul Rahman
- (Malaysia) Chua Boon Huat
- (New Zealand) Ryan Archibald
- (New Zealand) Brett Leaver
- (New Zealand) Craig Reynolds
- (New Zealand) Darren Smith
- (Pakistan) Muhammad Sarwar
- (South Korea) Kim Kyung-seok
- (South Korea) Kang Keon-wook
- (South Korea) Kang Kyong-won
- (South Korea) Seo Jong-ho
- (South Korea) Hwang Jong-hyun
- (South Korea) Ji Seong-hwan
