= 2004 Sultan Azlan Shah Cup =

Field hockey tournament

Tournament details
- Host country: Malaysia
- City: Kuala Lumpur
- Teams: 7 (from 3 confederations)
- Venue: Malaysia National Hockey Stadium

Final positions
- Champions: Australia (3rd title)
- Runner-up: Pakistan
- Third place: South Korea

Tournament statistics
- Matches played: 24
- Goals scored: 120 (5 per match)
- Top scorer: (Pakistan) Sohail Abbas (10 goals)

The 2004 Sultan Azlan Shah Cup was the 13th edition of field hockey tournament the Sultan Azlan Shah Cup.

== Participating nations ==
Seven countries participated in the tournament:

- Australia
- Germany
- India
- Malaysia
- Pakistan
- South Korea
- Spain

== Results ==
=== Preliminary round ===
==== Pool ====
Pos	Team	Pld	W	D	L	GF	GA	GD	Pts	Qualification
1	Pakistan	6	4	2	0	18	12	+6	14	Final
2	Australia	6	3	2	1	15	12	+3	11	Final
3	South Korea	6	3	1	2	15	11	+4	10	Third Place Match
4	Germany	6	3	1	2	18	16	+2	10	Third Place Match
5	Spain	6	2	2	2	17	17	0	8	Fifth Place Match
6	Malaysia	6	0	3	3	11	17	−6	3	Fifth Place Match
7	India	6	0	1	5	10	19	−9	1	

Source: Hockey Australia
Rules for classification: 1) points; 2) goal difference; 3) goals scored; 4) head-to-head result.

==== Fixtures ====
8 January 2004
16:05

South Korea	2–4	Pakistan
Seo 35'; Lee J. 43'	Report	Butt 14', 42'; Nadeem 39'; Hussain 68'

8 January 2004
18:05

India	1–3	Germany
Sandeep 18'	Report	Michel 4', 44'; Kunz 7'

8 January 2004
20:05

Malaysia	3–3	Spain
Kuhan 9', 37', 70'	Report	Amat 2'; Freixa 17', 44'

9 January 2004
16:05

Pakistan	3–2	India
Abbas 13', 27', 51'	Report	Baljit 15'; Rajpal 18'

9 January 2004
18:05

Spain	3–1	Australia
Sojo 13'; Freixa 49', 58'	Report	Brooks 26'

9 January 2004
20:05

Germany	4–2	Malaysia
Michel 17', 66'; Emmerling 58'; Hentschel 68'	Report	Ismail 21'; Rahim 44'

10 January 2004
18:05

Australia	1–1	South Korea
Elder 61'	Report	Lee J. 64'

11 January 2004
16:05

South Korea	1–2	Germany
Song 34'	Report	Michel 27'; Bechmann 68'

11 January 2004
18:05

Malaysia	2–2	India
Krishnamurthy 32'; Ismail 64'	Report	Aiyappa 21'; Halappa 62'

11 January 2004
20:05

Pakistan	4–2	Spain
Hussain 6'; Jawwad 17', 45', 66'	Report	Amat 43'; Ribas 62'

12 January 2004
18:05

Australia	3–2	Malaysia
Brooks 12'; Elder 31', 52'	Report	Keevan 18'; Azlan 56'

12 January 2004
20:05

Germany	3–4	Pakistan
Witthaus 34'; Köpp 45'; Michel 53'	Report	Abbas 42', 51', 59'; Nadeem 65'

13 January 2004
18:05

South Korea	4–1	Spain
Lee J. 17', 66'; Seo 42'; Yeo 65'	Report	Escarré 41'

13 January 2004
20:05

India	2–4	Australia
Pillay 15', 16'	Report	Woodhouse 27'; Elder 42'; Taylor 50'; Schubert 65'

14 January 2004
16:05

Spain	4–4	Germany
Freixa 4', 31', 34'; Amat 27'	Report	Köpp 10'; Kunz 51', 66'; Michel 69'

14 January 2004
18:05

Pakistan	1–1	Malaysia
Abbas 48'	Report	Kuhan 43'

14 January 2004
20:05

India	2–3	South Korea
Aiyappa 17'; Halappa 64'	Report	Yoon 25'; Yeo 29', 37'

15 January 2004
18:05

Australia	2–2	Pakistan
De Young 13'; Boyce 54'	Report	Abbas 37'; Khalid 51'

16 January 2004
16:05

Spain	4–1	India
Freixa 6'; Ribas 21'; Sojo 42'; Escarré 69'	Report	Aiyappa 66'

16 January 2004
18:05

Germany	2–4	Australia
Witthaus 32', 68'	Report	McCann 14'; Brooks 36'; Schubert 64', 67'

16 January 2004
20:05

Malaysia	1–4	South Korea
Kuhan 70'	Report	Lee J. 1', 2', 4'; Ji 39'

=== Classification round ===
==== Fifth and sixth place ====
18 January 2004
08:05

Spain	2–1	Malaysia
Freixa 49'; Velázquez 58'	Report	Chua 18'

==== Third and fourth place ====
18 January 2004
15:35

South Korea	3–3	Germany
Lee J. 38', 51'; Seo 57'	Report	Weißenborn 21'; Witthaus 23'; Bechmann 47'
Penalties
Yeo (penalty shoot-out scored); Kim Ky. (penalty shoot-out missed); Lee J. (penalty shoot-out scored); Seo (penalty shoot-out scored)	3–2	(penalty shoot-out missed) Scharowsky; (penalty shoot-out scored) Kunz; (penalty shoot-out missed) Emmerling; (penalty shoot-out scored) Bechmann; (penalty shoot-out missed) Weißenborn

==== Final ====
18 January 2004
18:05

Pakistan	3–4	Australia
Jawwad 30'; Abbas 44', 65'	Report	Brooks 21', 29'; Boyce 32'; Elder 57'

== Statistics ==
=== Final standings ===
Pos	Team	Pld	W	D	L	GF	GA	GD	Pts	Qualification
1st place, gold medalist(s)	Australia	7	4	2	1	19	15	+4	14	Gold Medal
2nd place, silver medalist(s)	Pakistan	7	4	2	1	21	16	+5	14	Silver Medal
3rd place, bronze medalist(s)	South Korea	7	3	2	2	18	14	+4	11	Bronze Medal
4	Germany	7	3	2	2	21	19	+2	11	
5	Spain	7	3	2	2	19	18	+1	11	
6	Malaysia	7	0	3	4	12	19	−7	3	
7	India	6	0	1	5	10	19	−9	1	

Source: Hockey Australia

=== Goalscorers ===
There were 120 goals scored in 24 matches, for an average of 5 goals per match.

10 goals

- (Pakistan) Sohail Abbas

9 goals

- (South Korea) Lee Jeong-Seon
- (Spain) Santiago Freixa

7 goals

- (Germany) Björn Michel

5 goals

- (Australia) Travis Brooks
- (Australia) Troy Elder
- (Malaysia) Kuhan Shanmuganathan

4 goals

- (Germany) Matthias Witthaus
- (Pakistan) Kashif Jawwad

3 goals

- (Australia) Grant Schubert
- (Germany) Florian Kunz
- (India) Len Aiyappa
- (South Korea) Seo Jong-Ho
- (South Korea) Yeo Woon-Kon
- (Spain) Pol Amat

2 goals

- (Australia) Michael Boyce
- (Germany) Christoph Bechmann
- (Germany) Benjamin Köpp
- (India) Arjun Halappa
- (India) Dhanraj Pillay
- (Malaysia) Ismail Abu
- (Pakistan) Rehan Butt
- (Pakistan) Shabbir Hussain
- (Pakistan) Muhammad Nadeem
- (Spain) Juan Escarré
- (Spain) Xavier Ribas
- (Spain) Víctor Sojo

1 goal

- (Australia) Michael McCann
- (Australia) Benjamin Taylor
- (Australia) Tristram Woodhouse
- (Australia) Liam de Young
- (Germany) Björn Emmerling
- (Germany) Tobias Hentschel
- (Germany) Tibor Weißenborn
- (India) Baljit Singh Dhillon
- (India) Rajpal Singh
- (India) Sandeep Singh
- (Malaysia) Chua Boon Huat
- (Malaysia) Krishnamurthy Gobinathan
- (Malaysia) Azlan Misron
- (Malaysia) Amin Rahim
- (Malaysia) Keevan Raj
- (Pakistan) Saleem Khalid
- (South Korea) Ji Seung-Hwan
- (South Korea) Song Seung-Tae
- (South Korea) Yoon Young-Sik
- (Spain) Alberto Velázquez
