= Pakistan at the 2000 Summer Olympics =

- IOC code: PAK
- NOC: National Olympic Committee of Pakistan
- Website: www.nocpakistan.org

in Sydney
- Competitors: 26 in 6 sports
- Flag bearer: Ahmed Alam
- Medals: Gold 0 Silver 0 Bronze 0 Total 0

Summer Olympics appearances (overview)
- 1948; 1952; 1956; 1960; 1964; 1968; 1972; 1976; 1980; 1984; 1988; 1992; 1996; 2000; 2004; 2008; 2012; 2016; 2020; 2024

Pakistan competed at the 2000 Summer Olympics in Sydney, Australia.

== Athletics ==
Key

- Note–Ranks given for track events are within the athlete's heat only
- Q = Qualified for the next round
- q = Qualified for the next round as a fastest loser or, in field events, by position without achieving the qualifying target
- NR = National record
- DQ = Disqualified
- DNS / F = Did not start / finish
- N/A = Round not applicable for the event
- Bye = Athlete not required to compete in round
- NM = No mark

Track & road events

Men

Athlete	Event	Heat		Quarter-final		Semi-final		Final	
Athlete	Event	Result	Rank	Result	Rank	Result	Rank	Result	Rank
Maqsood Ahmad	200 m	21.70	8	did not advance					

Women

Athlete	Event	Heat		Semi-final		Final	
Athlete	Event	Result	Rank	Result	Rank	Result	Rank
Shazia Hidayat	1500 m	5:07.17	14	did not advance			

== Boxing ==
Athlete	Event	Round of 32	Round of 16	Quarterfinals	Semifinals	Final	
Athlete	Event	Opposition Result	Opposition Result	Opposition Result	Opposition Result	Opposition Result	Rank
Haider Ali	Featherweight	Ramazan Palyani (TUR); L 4–5	did not advance				
Asghar Ali Shah	Lightweight	Bye	Tigkran Ouzlian (GRE); L 15–17	did not advance			
Ghulam Shabbir	Light welterweight	Kelson Santos (BRA); L RSC	did not advance				
Usman Ullah Khan	Welterweight	Yovanny Lorenzo (DOM); L 4–5	did not advance				

== Hockey ==
Summary

Key:

- FT – After full-time.
- P – Match decided by penalty-shootout.

Team	Event	Group stage						Semifinal	Final / BM	
Team	Event	Opposition Score	Opposition Score	Opposition Score	Opposition Score	Opposition Score	Rank	Opposition Score	Opposition Score	Rank
Pakistan men's	Men's tournament	Canada; D 2–2	Great Britain; W 8–1	Germany; D 1–1	Malaysia; D 2–2	Netherlands; W 2–0	1	South Korea; L 0–1	Australia; L 3–6	4

Team roster

Head coach: Khwaja Zakauddin

Pos.	Player	DoB	Age	Club	Tournament games	Tournament goals
	Ahmed Alam	16 February 1972	28	(Pakistan) PIA	7	0
	Ali Raza	10 November 1976	23	(Pakistan) PIA	2	0
	Tariq Imran	3 February 1977	23		7	0
	Irfan Yousaf	February 25, 1980	20		6	0
	Imran Yousuf	23 December 1978	21		7	0
	Waseem Ahmed	10 April 1977	23	(Pakistan) WAPDA	7	0
	Muhammad Nadeem	5 March 1972	28	(Pakistan) NBP	7	2
	Atif Bashir	1 March 1971	29		7	4
	Kamran Ashraf	30 September 1973	22		7	3
	Muhammad Sarwar	12 May 1975	25		7	1
	Muhammad Qasim	1 December 1976	23		1	0
	Sohail Abbas	9 June 1975	25	(Pakistan) SSGC	7	8
	Muhammad Shafqat Malik	7 November 1970	29		6	0
	Sameer Hussain	14 February 1982	18		5	0
	Kashif Jawad	7 February 1981	19	(Pakistan) HBL	7	2
	Anis Ahmed	10 December 1973	26		7	0

Group stage

Pos	Team	Pld	W	D	L	GF	GA	GD	Pts	Qualification
1	Pakistan	5	2	3	0	15	6	+9	9	Semi-finals
2	Netherlands	5	2	2	1	11	8	+3	8	Semi-finals
3	Germany	5	2	2	1	7	6	+1	8	
4	Great Britain	5	1	2	2	8	16	−8	5	
5	Malaysia	5	0	4	1	5	6	−1	4	
6	Canada	5	0	3	2	7	11	−4	3	

Source: FIH

16 September 2000
18:30

Canada	2–2	Pakistan
Pereira 5'; Campbell 22'	Report	Ashraf 16'; Abbas 34'

Umpires:
Han Jin-soo (KOR)
Donald Prior (AUS)

18 September 2000
13:30

Great Britain	1–8	Pakistan
Pearn 20'	Report	Abbas 7', 10', 31'; Nadeem 19', 70+'; Bashir 51', 55'; Sarwar 62'

Umpires:
Ray O'Connor (IRL)
Eric Denis (BEL)

21 September 2000
15:30

Germany	1–1	Pakistan
Domke 19'	Report	Abbas 30'

Umpires:
Henrik Ehlers (DEN)
Santiago Deo (ESP)

23 September 2000
13:30

Malaysia	2–2	Pakistan
Suhaimi 21', 63'	Report	Bashir 24'; Abbas 70+'

Umpires:
Murray Grime (AUS)
Ray O'Connor (IRL)

26 September 2000
15:30

Netherlands	0–2	Pakistan
	Report	Abbas 22'; Jawad 67'

Umpires:
Santiago Deo (ESP)
Han Jin-soo (KOR)

Semifinal

28 September 2000
14:00

Pakistan	0–1	South Korea
	Report	Song 57'

Umpires:
Peter von Reth (NED)
Christian Siebrecht (GER)

Bronze medal match

30 September 2000
17:30

Pakistan	3–6	Australia
Bashir 6'; Abbas 46'; Javad 70+'	Report	Elder 3', 8', 60'; Davies 30'; Elmer 49'; Brennan 66'

Umpires:
Peter von Roth (NED)
Eduardo Ruiz (ARG)

== Rowing ==
Athlete	Event	Heat		Quarterfinals		Repechage		Semifinals		Final	
Athlete	Event	Time	Rank	Time	Rank	Time	Rank	Time	Rank	Time	Rank
Muhammad Akram	Single sculls	—N/a		7:54.71	6	7:50.50	5 Q	7:45.12	5 Q	DNS	–
Hazrat Islam; Zahid Ali Pirzada	Lightweight double sculls	7:13.62	5	—N/a		7:13.98	4 Q	Bye		6:52.12	5

== Shooting ==
Men

Athlete	Event	Qualification		Final	
Athlete	Event	Points	Rank	Points	Rank
Khurram Inam	Skeet	119	23	did not advance	

== Swimming ==
Key

- Note–Ranks given are within the athlete's heat only
- Q = Qualified for the next round
- q = Qualified for the next round as a fastest loser
- DQ = Disqualified
- DNS / F = Did not start / finish
- N/A = Round not applicable for the event
- Bye = Athlete not required to compete in round

Men

Athlete	Event	Heat		Semifinal		Final	
Athlete	Event	Time	Rank	Time	Rank	Time	Rank
Kamal Salman Masud	100 metre butterfly	1:00.60	61	did not advance			
