= Pakistan at the 2004 Summer Olympics =

- IOC code: PAK
- NOC: National Olympic Committee of Pakistan
- Website: www.nocpakistan.org

in Athens
- Competitors: 26 in 5 sports
- Flag bearer (opening): Mohammad Nadeem
- Flag bearer (closing): Mehrullah Lassi
- Medals: Gold 0 Silver 0 Bronze 0 Total 0

Summer Olympics appearances (overview)
- 1948; 1952; 1956; 1960; 1964; 1968; 1972; 1976; 1980; 1984; 1988; 1992; 1996; 2000; 2004; 2008; 2012; 2016; 2020; 2024

Pakistan competed at the 2004 Summer Olympics in Athens, Greece, from 13 to 29 August 2004.

== Athletics ==
Pakistani athletes have so far achieved qualifying standards in the following athletics events (up to a maximum of 3 athletes in each event at the 'A' Standard, and 1 at the 'B' Standard).

Men

| Athlete | Event | Heat | | Semifinal | | Final | |
| Athlete | Event | Result | Rank | Result | Rank | Result | Rank |
|---|---|---|---|---|---|---|---|
| Sajid Muhammad | 400 m | 47.45 | 7 | Did not advance | | | |

Women

| Athlete | Event | Heat | | Semifinal | | Final | |
| Athlete | Event | Result | Rank | Result | Rank | Result | Rank |
|---|---|---|---|---|---|---|---|
| Sumaira Zahoor | 1500 m | 4:49.33 | 15 | Did not advance | | | |

Key

- Note–Ranks given for track events are within the athlete's heat only
- Q = Qualified for the next round
- q = Qualified for the next round as a fastest loser or, in field events, by position without achieving the qualifying target
- NR = National record
- N/A = Round not applicable for the event
- Bye = Athlete not required to compete in round

== Boxing ==
Pakistan sent five boxers to Athens.

| Athlete | Event | Round of 32 | Round of 16 | Quarterfinals | Semifinals | Final | |
| Athlete | Event | Opposition Result | Opposition Result | Opposition Result | Opposition Result | Opposition Result | Rank |
|---|---|---|---|---|---|---|---|
| Mehrullah Lassi | Bantamweight | Abdymomunov (KGZ); W 36–22 | Rigondeaux (CUB); L RSC | Did not advance | | | |
| Sohail Ahmed | Featherweight | Khidirov (UZB); L RSC | Did not advance | | | | |
| Asghar Ali Shah | Lightweight | Kravets (UKR); W 21–17 | Kindelán (CUB); L 9–24 | Did not advance | | | |
| Faisal Karim | Light welterweight | Gheorghe (ROM); L 11–26 | Did not advance | | | | |
| Ahmed Ali Khan | Middleweight | Bye | Golovkin (KAZ); L 10–31 | Did not advance | | | |

== Field hockey ==
=== Men's tournament ===
Roster

The following is the Pakistani roster in the men's field hockey tournament of the 2004 Summer Olympics.

Head coach: Roelant Oltmans

1. Ahmed Alam (GK)
2. Kashif Jawad
3. Mohammad Nadeem (C)
4. Ghazanfar Ali
5. Adnan Maqsood
6. Waseem Ahmed
7. Dilawar Hussain
8. Rehan Butt
9. Sohail Abbas
10. Ali Raza
11. Shabbir Muhammad
12. Salman Akbar (GK)
13. Zeeshan Ashraf
14. Mudassar Ali Khan
15. Shakeel Abbasi
16. Tariq Aziz

Group play

| Pos | Team | Pld | W | D | L | GF | GA | GD | Pts | Qualification |
|---|---|---|---|---|---|---|---|---|---|---|
| 1 | Spain | 5 | 3 | 2 | 0 | 14 | 3 | +11 | 11 | Semi-finals |
| 2 | Germany | 5 | 3 | 2 | 0 | 15 | 6 | +9 | 11 | Semi-finals |
| 3 | Pakistan | 5 | 3 | 0 | 2 | 19 | 8 | +11 | 9 | 5–8th place semi-finals |
| 4 | South Korea | 5 | 2 | 2 | 1 | 17 | 8 | +9 | 8 | 5–8th place semi-finals |
| 5 | Great Britain | 5 | 1 | 0 | 4 | 9 | 21 | −12 | 3 | 9–12th place semi-finals |
| 6 | Egypt | 5 | 0 | 0 | 5 | 2 | 30 | −28 | 0 | 9–12th place semi-finals |

Source: FIH

15 August 2004
18:30

| Germany | 2 – 1 | Pakistan |
|---|---|---|
| Emmerling 7'; Michel 31' | Report | Butt 43' |

Umpires:
Ray O'Connor (IRL)
John Wright (RSA)

17 August 2004
18:30

| Egypt | 0 – 7 | Pakistan |
|---|---|---|
| | Report | Jawad 3', 12'; Nadeem 15'; Abbas 30', 34', 38', 58' |

Umpires:
Han Jin-Soo (KOR)
Peter Elders (NED)

19 August 2004
10:30

| Pakistan | 3 – 0 | South Korea |
|---|---|---|
| Butt 43'; Abbasi 56'; Abbas 66' | Report |

Umpires:
Ray O'Connor (IRL)
Amarjit Singh (MAS)

21 August 2004
20:00

| Spain | 4 – 0 | Pakistan |
|---|---|---|
| Tubau 6', 35', 41'; Freixa 63' | Report |

Umpires:
Peter Elders (NED)
John Wright (RSA)

23 August 2004
18:00

| Pakistan | 8 – 2 | Great Britain |
|---|---|---|
| Abbas 9', 39'; Ali 35+'; Nadeem 37'; Butt 55', 68'; Abbasi 59'; Shabbir 60' | Report | Stott 5'; Hall 65' |

Umpires:
Murray Grime (AUS)
Ray O'Connor (IRL)

5th–8th place match

25 August 2004
20:30

| Pakistan | 3 – 0 | India |
|---|---|---|
| Aziz 43'; Abbas 59'; Shabbir 68' | Report |

Umpires:
David Leiper (GBR)
Amarjit Singh (MAS)

5th place match

27 August 2004
11:00

| New Zealand | 2 – 4 | Pakistan |
|---|---|---|
| Brooks 16'; Smith 35' | Report | Abbas 35', 47', 68'; Jawad 55' |

Umpires:
Sumesh Putra (CAN)
David Leiper (GBR)

== Shooting ==
Men

| Athlete | Event | Qualification | | Final | |
| Athlete | Event | Points | Rank | Points | Rank |
|---|---|---|---|---|---|
| Khurram Inam | Skeet | 114 | =37 | Did not advance | |

== Swimming ==
Men

| Athlete | Event | Heat | | Semifinal | | Final | |
| Athlete | Event | Time | Rank | Time | Rank | Time | Rank |
|---|---|---|---|---|---|---|---|
| Mumtaz Ahmed | 100 m freestyle | 59.19 | 68 | Did not advance | | | |

Women

| Athlete | Event | Heat | | Semifinal | | Final | |
| Athlete | Event | Time | Rank | Time | Rank | Time | Rank |
|---|---|---|---|---|---|---|---|
| Rubab Raza | 50 m freestyle | 30.10 | 59 | Did not advance | | | |

== See also ==
- Pakistan at the 2002 Asian Games
- Pakistan at the 2004 Summer Paralympics
