= 2004 India–Pakistan field hockey test series =

2004 India-Pakistan field hockey test series
Tournament details
- City: Karachi, Quetta, Peshawar, Lahore; Delhi, Chandigarh, Amritsar, Hyderabad
- Dates: 24 September 2004 - 10 October 2004
- Venue: 8 in 8 host cities

Final positions
- Champions: Pakistan won the series 4-2

Tournament statistics
- Matches played: 8
- Goals scored: 32 (4 per match)
- Top scorer: (Pakistan) Sohail Abbas (8 goals)

The 2004 Indo-Pak series was the 7th series of bilateral field hockey matches between Pakistan and India. The series was played over eight matches on home and away basis.

Each side hosted four matches from 24 September 2004 to 10 October 2004. Pakistan won the series 4–2. This was the first time both sides were coached by foreign coaches in a bilateral series with Gerhard Roch of Germany coaching India and Roelant Oltmans of Netherlands coaching for Pakistan. During the match in Amritsar, Pakistan's Sohail Abbas broke the record for most goals in international men's hockey scoring his 268th goal surpassing Paul Litjens of Netherlands who held the record for 22 years.

== Background ==
Prior to the start of the series Pakistan and India had faced each other 6 times since January 2004. They first met at the 2004 Azlan Shah Cup in Kuala Lumpur with Pakistan winning 3–2. They met twice in the 2004 Olympic Qualifiers in Madrid with Pakistan winning both matches. In June Pakistan again defeated India twice this time by a huge margin of 6–1 at the Hockey RaboTrophy in Amsterdam. Both teams had a disappointing campaign at the Olympics in Athens Pakistan defeated India in the crossover rounds to finish 5th while India finished 7th.

Sohail Abbas scored 12 goals against India in these matches including two hat-tricks. This series was also in the lead up to the 2004 Champions Trophy to be held in Lahore from December.

== Venues ==
Match	Location	Stadium Name	Date
First	Karachi, Pakistan	Hockey Club of Pakistan	24 September
Second	Quetta, Pakistan	Musa Khan Stadium	27 September
Third	Peshawar, Pakistan	Lala Ayub Hockey Stadium	29 September
Fourth	Lahore, Pakistan	National Hockey Stadium	1 October
Fifth	Delhi, India	Major Dhyan Chand National Stadium	4 October
Sixth	Chandigarh, India	Sector 42 Hockey Stadium	6 October
Seventh	Amritsar, India	Guru Nank Dev University Stadium	8 October
Eighth	Hyderabad, India	Gachibowli Hockey Stadium	10 October

== Squads ==
India announced an 18-member squad on 20 September 2004. The Indian selection ignored veterans like Dhanraj Pillay, Baljit Singh Dhillon, Deepak Thakur and Gagan Ajit Singh, who all were part of the team at the Athens Olympics after the players made themselves unavailable for selection for different reasons. Pakistan announced its squad on 20 September as well. Waseem Ahmed was made captain after former captain Muhammad Nadeem announced his retirement from international hockey after the last month's Olympics.

Pakistan	India
Waseem Ahmed (C); Salman Akbar (GK); Nasir Ahmed; Sohail Abbas; Zeeshan Ashraf; Muhammad Imran; Imran Warsi; Ghazanfar Ali; Adnan Maqsood; Dilawar Hussain; Abdul Aasim Khan; Imran Khan; Rehan Butt; Mudassar Ali Khan; Kashif Jawad; Shakeel Abbasi; Adnan Zakir; Tariq Aziz; Shabbir Hussain; Akhtar Ali	Dilip Tirkey (C); Devesh Chauhan (GK); Adrian D'Souza (GK); Harpal Singh; Sandeep Singh; William Xalxo; Viren Rasquinha; Vikram Pillay; Girish Pimpale; Ignace Tirkey; V. S. Vinay; Prabodh Tirkey; Vivek Gupta; Adam Sinclair; Arjun Halappa; Sandeep Michael; Tushar Khandekar; Hari Prasad
Coach (Netherlands) Roelant Oltmans	Coach (Germany) Gerhard Roch

== Results ==
- Pakistan won the series 4-2

First Leg
Match	Date	Score	Location
1	24 September	Pakistan 2-1 India	Karachi
2	27 September	Pakistan 1-4 India	Quetta
3	29 September	Pakistan 3-2 India	Peshawar
4	1 October	Pakistan 4-4 India	Lahore

Second Leg
Match	Date	Score	Location
1	4 October	India 1-3 Pakistan	Delhi
2	6 October	India 1-1 Pakistan	Chandigarh
3	8 October	India 1-2 Pakistan	Amritsar
4	10 October	India 2-0 Pakistan	Hyderabad

== Matches ==
=== Game 1 ===
24 September 2004

Pakistan	2–1	India
Abbas 17'; Butt 26'	Report	Halappa 3'

Hockey Club of Pakistan, Karachi

=== Game 2 ===
27 September 2004

Pakistan	1–4	India
Abbas 69'	Report	Sandeep 13', 17'; Tirkey 33'; Khandekar 60'

Musa Khan Stadium, Quetta

=== Game 3 ===
29 September 2004

Pakistan	3–2	India
Mudassar 15'; Abbasi 25'; Abbas 67'	Report	Prasad 48'; Halappa 60'

Lala Ayub Hockey Stadium, Peshawar

=== Game 4 ===
1 October 2004

Pakistan	4–4	India
Abbas 14', 42'; Ali 57'; Butt 67'	Report	Pillay 15'; Sandeep 39'; Halappa 49'; Tirkey 51'

National Hockey Stadium, Lahore

=== Game 5 ===
4 October 2004

India	1–3	Pakistan
Michael 50'	Report	Jawad 6'; Abbas 29', 64'

Major Dhyan Chand National Stadium, Delhi

=== Game 6 ===
6 October 2004

India	1–1	Pakistan
Tirkey 33'	Report	Ali 22'

Sector 42 Hockey Stadium, Chandigarh

=== Game 7 ===
8 October 2004

India	1–2	Pakistan
Halappa 48'	Report	Abbas 8'; Butt 47'

Guru Nanak Dev University Stadium, Amritsar

=== Game 8 ===
10 October 2004

India	2–0	Pakistan
Michael 17'; Khandekar 21'	Report

Gachibowli Hockey Stadium, Hyderabad

== Statistics ==
Team	P	W	D	L	GF	GA	GD
Pakistan	8	4	2	2	16	16	0
India	8	2	2	4	16	16	0

=== Goalscorers ===
There were 32 goals scored in 8 matches for an average of 4 goals per match

8 goals

- (Pakistan) Sohail Abbas

4 goals

- (India) Arjun Halappa

3 goals

- (India) Sandeep Singh
- (India) Ignace Tirkey
- (Pakistan) Rehan Butt

2 goals

- (India) Tushar Khandekar
- (India) Sandeep Michael

1 goal

- (Pakistan) Mudassar Ali Khan
- (Pakistan) Shakeel Abbasi
- (India) Hari Prasad
- (India) Vikram Pillay
- (Pakistan) Aktar Ali
- (Pakistan) Kashif Jawad
- (Pakistan) Ghazanfar Ali
