= 2003 Sultan Azlan Shah Cup =

Field hockey tournament

Tournament details
- Host country: Malaysia
- City: Ipoh
- Teams: 5
- Venue: Azlan Shah Stadium

Final positions
- Champions: Pakistan (3rd title)
- Runner-up: Germany
- Third place: New Zealand

Tournament statistics
- Matches played: 12
- Goals scored: 48 (4 per match)
- Top scorer(s): (New Zealand) Hayden Shaw (Pakistan) Sohail Abbas (5 goals)
- Best player: (Pakistan) Sohail Abbas

The 2003 Sultan Azlan Shah Cup was the 12th edition of field hockey tournament the Sultan Azlan Shah Cup.

== Participating nations ==
Five countries participated in the tournament:

- New Zealand
- Malaysia
- Pakistan
- Germany
- South Korea

== Results ==
=== Preliminary round ===
Pos	Team	Pld	W	D	L	GF	GA	GD	Pts	Qualification
1	Germany	4	4	0	0	11	6	+5	12	Final
2	Pakistan	4	3	0	1	13	6	+7	9	Final
3	New Zealand	4	2	0	2	10	13	−3	6	Third Place Match
4	South Korea	4	1	0	3	4	6	−2	3	Third Place Match
5	Malaysia	4	0	0	4	4	11	−7	0	

Source: Deutscher Hockey-Bund
Rules for classification: 1) points; 2) goal difference; 3) goals scored; 4) head-to-head result.

==== Fixtures ====
22 March 2003
11:00

Pakistan	6–1	New Zealand
Jawwad 9', 58'; Saqlain 27'; Hussain 38'; Abbas 43'; Butt 51'	Report	Shaw 33'

22 March 2003
13:00

Malaysia	0–2	South Korea
	Report	You 17'; Lee J. 35'

23 March 2003
11:00

Germany	4–3	Pakistan
Landshut 8'; Biederlack 22'; Weß 34'; Köpp 57'	Report	Abbas 25'; Jawwad 42'; Butt 65'

24 March 2003
11:00

New Zealand	4–2	Malaysia
Shaw 8'; Patel 12'; Burrows 34'; Parag 67'	Report	Rahim 29'; Nasir 50'

24 March 2003
13:00

South Korea	0–2	Germany
	Report	Weißenborn 42'; Landshut 47'

26 March 2003
11:00

New Zealand	3–2	South Korea
Hari 1'; Shaw 40'; Burrows 51'	Report	Seo 16'; Jang 68'

26 March 2003
13:00

Pakistan	3–1	Malaysia
Raza 2'; Abbas 3', 57'	Report	Norazlan 50'

27 March 2003
11:00

Malaysia	1–2	Germany
Azlan 68'	Report	Scharowsky 56'; Bechmann 63'

28 March 2003
11:00

Germany	3–2	New Zealand
Landshut 7'; Zeller 13'; Bechmann 53'	Report	Shaw 30'; McIndoe 44'

28 March 2003
13:00

South Korea	0–1	Pakistan
	Report	Abbas 4'

=== Classification round ===
==== Third and fourth place ====
30 March 2003
09:00

New Zealand	3–2	South Korea
Shaw 6'; Burrows 42'; Hari 64'	Report	Lee J. 9', 17'

==== Final ====
30 March 2003
11:30

Germany	0–1	Pakistan
	Report	Hussain 62'

== Awards ==
Player of the Tournament	Top Goalscorers	Most Promising Player
(Pakistan) Sohail Abbas	(New Zealand) Hayden Shaw (Pakistan) Sohail Abbas	(Germany) Christopher Zeller

== Statistics ==
=== Final standings ===
Pos	Team	Pld	W	D	L	GF	GA	GD	Pts	Qualification
1st place, gold medalist(s)	Pakistan	5	4	0	1	14	6	+8	12	Gold Medal
2nd place, silver medalist(s)	Germany	5	4	0	1	11	7	+4	12	Silver Medal
3rd place, bronze medalist(s)	New Zealand	5	3	0	2	13	15	−2	9	Bronze Medal
4	South Korea	5	1	0	4	6	9	−3	3	
5	Malaysia	4	0	0	4	4	11	−7	0	

Source: Deutscher Hockey-Bund

=== Goalscorers ===
There were 48 goals scored in 12 matches, for an average of 4 goals per match.

5 goals

- (New Zealand) Hayden Shaw
- (Pakistan) Sohail Abbas

3 goals

- (Germany) Maximilien Landshut
- (New Zealand) Phil Burrows
- (Pakistan) Kashif Jawwad
- (South Korea) Lee Jeong-Seon

2 goals

- (Germany) Christoph Bechmann
- (New Zealand) Bevan Hari
- (Pakistan) Shabbir Hussain
- (Pakistan) Rehan Butt

1 goal

- (Germany) Sebastian Biederlack
- (Germany) Benjamin Köpp
- (Germany) Justus Scharowsky
- (Germany) Tibor Weißenborn
- (Germany) Timo Weß
- (Germany) Christopher Zeller
- (Malaysia) Azlan Misron
- (Malaysia) Amin Rahim
- (Malaysia) Norazlan Rahim
- (Malaysia) Nasir Riduan
- (New Zealand) Wayne McIndoe
- (New Zealand) Umesh Parag
- (New Zealand) Mitesh Patel
- (Pakistan) Ali Raza
- (Pakistan) Muhammad Saqlain
- (South Korea) You Hyo-Sik
- (South Korea) Seo Jong-Ho
- (South Korea) Jang Jong-Hyun
