= 2004 Men's Hockey RaboTrophy =

Tournament details
- Host country: Netherlands
- City: Amsterdam
- Teams: 4
- Venue(s): Wagener Stadium

Final positions
- Champions: Germany (1st title)
- Runner-up: Netherlands
- Third place: Pakistan

Tournament statistics
- Matches played: 8
- Goals scored: 45 (5.63 per match)
- Top scorer(s): (Germany) Björn Michel (6 goals)

The 2004 Men's Hockey RaboTrophy was the second edition of the men's field hockey tournament. The RaboTrophy was held in Amsterdam from 26 June to 4 July 2004, and featured four of the top nations in men's field hockey.

Germany won the tournament for the first time, defeating the Netherlands 5–4 in the final.

The tournament was held in conjunction with the Women's RaboTrophy.

== Competition format ==
The four teams competed in a pool stage, played in a single round robin format. At the conclusion of the pool stage, the top two teams contested the final, while the remaining teams played off for third place.

== Teams ==
The following four teams competed for the title:

- Germany
- India
- Netherlands
- Pakistan

== Officials ==
The following umpires were appointed by the International Hockey Federation to officiate the tournament:

- Jamil Butt (PAK)
- Peter Elders (NED)
- Satinder Kumar (IND)
- David Leiper (SCO)
- Markus Petter (GER)

== Results ==
All times are local (Central European Time).

=== Preliminary round ===
==== Pool ====
Pos	Team	Pld	W	D	L	GF	GA	GD	Pts	Qualification
1	Netherlands (H)	3	3	0	0	8	3	+5	9	Advanced to Final
2	Germany	3	2	0	1	11	3	+8	6	Advanced to Final
3	Pakistan	3	1	0	2	8	10	−2	3	
4	India	3	0	0	3	1	12	−11	0	

Source: Rabobank Trophy
Rules for classification: 1) Points; 2) Goal difference; 3) Goals scored; 4) Games won; 5) Head-to-head.
(H) Hosts

==== Fixtures ====
26 June 2004
17:30

Pakistan	0–6	Germany
	Report	Witthaus 12'; Michel 22', 33'; Kunz 51', 57'; Bechmann 67'

Umpires:
David Leiper (SCO)
Peter Elders (NED)

27 June 2004
16:00

Netherlands	2–0	India
De Nooijer 29'; R. Brouwer 39'	Report

Umpires:
Markus Petter (GER)
Jamil Butt (PAK)

29 June 2004
15:00

Pakistan	6–1	India
Abbasi 7'; Abbas 28', 43'; S. Hussain 33'; Jawwad 55'; Nadeem 64'	Report	Deepak 32'

Umpires:
David Leiper (SCO)
Markus Petter (GER)

29 June 2004
19:30

Germany	1–3	Netherlands
C. Zeller 49'	Report	Klaver 14'; R. Brouwer 25'; Taekema 33'

Umpires:
Satinder Kumar (IND)
Jamil Butt (PAK)

1 July 2004
17:00

Germany	4–0	India
Bechmann 49'; Michel 44', 51', 54'	Report

Umpires:
Peter Elders (NED)
Jamil Butt (PAK)

1 July 2004
19:30

Netherlands	3–2	Pakistan
De Nooijer 5'; Klaver 41'; M. Brouwer 69'	Report	Ali 50'; D. Hussain 56'

Umpires:
Markus Petter (GER)
Satinder Kumar (IND)

=== Classification round ===
==== Third and fourth place ====
3 July 2004
17:30

Pakistan	5–3	India
Jawwad 7', 57', 68'; Butt 26', 65'	Report	D. Tirkey 14'; Baljeet 47'; Gagan 49'

Umpires:
David Leiper (SCO)
Peter Elders (NED)

==== Final ====
4 July 2004
15:30

Netherlands	4–5	Germany
M. Brouwer 2'; Evers 5'; Eikelboom 20'; R. Brouwer 54'	Report	Bechmann 10'; Emmerling 25'; Michel 37'; C. Zeller 50'; Witthaus 65'

Umpires:
Jamil Butt (PAK)
Satinder Kumar (IND)

== Statistics ==
=== Final standings ===
As per statistical convention in field hockey, matches decided in extra time are counted as wins and losses, while matches decided by penalty shoot-outs are counted as draws.

Pos	Team	Pld	W	D	L	GF	GA	GD	Pts	Status
1st place, gold medalist(s)	Germany	4	3	0	1	16	7	+9	9	Gold Medal
2nd place, silver medalist(s)	Netherlands (H)	4	3	0	1	12	8	+4	9	Silver Medal
3rd place, bronze medalist(s)	Pakistan	4	2	0	2	13	13	0	6	Bronze Medal
4	India	4	0	0	4	4	17	−13	0	

Source: Rabobank Trophy
(H) Hosts

=== Goalscorers ===
There were 45 goals scored in 8 matches, for an average of 5.62 goals per match.

6 goals

- (Germany) Björn Michel

4 goals

- (Pakistan) Kashif Jawwad

3 goals

- (Germany) Christoph Bechmann
- (Netherlands) Ronald Brouwer

2 goals

- (Germany) Florian Kunz
- (Germany) Matthias Witthaus
- (Germany) Christopher Zeller
- (Netherlands) Matthijs Brouwer
- (Netherlands) Karel Klaver
- (Netherlands) Teun de Nooijer
- (Pakistan) Sohail Abbas
- (Pakistan) Rehan Butt

1 goal

- (Germany) Björn Emmerling
- (India) Baljeet Singh
- (India) Gagan Ajit Singh
- (India) Deepak Thakur
- (India) Dilip Tirkey
- (Netherlands) Marten Eikelboom
- (Netherlands) Floris Evers
- (Netherlands) Taeke Taekema
- (Pakistan) Shakeel Abbasi
- (Pakistan) Ghazanfar Ali
- (Pakistan) Dilawar Hussain
- (Pakistan) Shabbir Hussain
- (Pakistan) Muhammad Nadeem
