= 2003 Men's Oceania Cup =

Field hockey tournament

2003 Oceania Cup
Tournament details
- Host country: New Zealand
- Dates: 17–21 September
- Venue: 2 (in 2 host cities)

Final positions
- Champions: Australia (3rd title)
- Runner-up: New Zealand

Tournament statistics
- Matches played: 3
- Goals scored: 19 (6.33 per match)
- Top scorer: (Australia) Troy Elder (4 goals)

The 2003 Men's Oceania Cup was the third edition of the men's field hockey tournament. It was held from 17–21 September in Christchurch and Wellington.

The tournament served as a qualifier for the 2004 Olympic Games.

Australia won the tournament for the third time, defeating New Zealand in the three–game series, 3–0.

== Results ==
All times are local (NZST).

=== Pool ===
Pos	Team	Pld	W	D	L	GF	GA	GD	Pts	Qualification
1	Australia	3	3	0	0	12	7	+5	9	2004 Summer Olympics
2	New Zealand	3	0	0	3	7	12	−5	0	

Source: Clearing House
Rules for classification: 1) points; 2) goal difference; 3) goals scored; 4) head-to-head result.

=== Fixtures ===
17 September 2003
19:00

New Zealand	3–4	Australia
Shaw 14', 31', 69'	Report	Eglington 6'; Gaudoin 23'; Schubert 26'; Smith 29'

Canterbury Hockey Association, Christchurch
Umpires:
Richard Wölter (GER)
Satinder Kumar (IND)

20 September 2003
15:15

New Zealand	3–4	Australia
Hari 2', 29'; Burrows 42'	Report	Elder 23', 40', 60'; Victory 62'

National Hockey Stadium, Wellington
Umpires:
Amarjit Singh (MAS)
Richard Wölter (GER)

20 September 2003
15:00

New Zealand	1–4	Australia
Burrows 6'	Report	Victory 19'; Gaudoin 29'; Elder 40'; McCann 61'

National Hockey Stadium, Wellington
Umpires:
Satinder Kumar (IND)
Amarjit Singh (MAS)

== Statistics ==
=== Final standings ===
1. Australia
2. New Zealand

=== Goalscorers ===
There were 19 goals scored in 3 matches, for an average of 6.33 goals per match.

4 goals

- (Australia) Troy Elder

3 goals

- (New Zealand) Hayden Shaw

2 goals

- (Australia) Craig Victory
- (Australia) Paul Gaudoin
- (New Zealand) Phil Burrows
- (New Zealand) Bevan Hari

1 goal

- (Australia) Nathan Eglington
- (Australia) Michael McCann
- (Australia) Grant Schubert
- (Australia) Andrew Smith
