= Pakistan at the 2016 Summer Olympics =

- IOC code: PAK
- NOC: National Olympic Committee of Pakistan
- Website: www.nocpakistan.org

in Rio de Janeiro
- Competitors: 7 in 4 sports
- Flag bearer: Ghulam Mustafa Bashir
- Medals: Gold 0 Silver 0 Bronze 0 Total 0

Summer Olympics appearances (overview)
- 1948; 1952; 1956; 1960; 1964; 1968; 1972; 1976; 1980; 1984; 1988; 1992; 1996; 2000; 2004; 2008; 2012; 2016; 2020; 2024

Pakistan competed at the 2016 Summer Olympics in Rio de Janeiro, Brazil, from 5 to 21 August 2016. This was the nation's seventeenth appearance at the Summer Olympics. None of the athletes won a medal, and as of these Games, Pakistan had not earned an Olympic medal since 1992 Summer Olympics bronze in field hockey.

Pakistan Olympic Association sent the nation's smallest ever delegation to the Games, as the men's field hockey failed to qualify for the first time in a non-boycott Olympic edition. A total of seven athletes, four men and three women, were selected to the Pakistani team across four different sports. All of them had gained their Olympic entries, either through Tripartite Commission invitations or quota spots, with swimmers Lianna Swan and Haris Bandey, as well as judoka Shah Hussain Shah, being based abroad. Meanwhile, rapid fire pistol shooter Ghulam Mustafa Bashir was nominated by the Pakistan Sports Board (PSB) to bear the nation's flag in the opening ceremony.

Pakistan's Olympic campaign ended on August 15, a week before the close of the Olympics, after Najma Parveen failed to pass the preliminary heats in the women's 200 metres, making it Pakistan's worst ever performance at the Olympics.

== Athletics ==
Pakistan has received universality slots from IAAF to send two athletes (one male and one female) to the Olympics.

Key

- Note–Ranks given for track events are within the athlete's heat only
- Q = Qualified for the next round
- q = Qualified for the next round as a fastest loser or, in field events, by position without achieving the qualifying target
- NR = National record
- N/A = Round not applicable for the event
- Bye = Athlete not required to compete in round

Athlete	Event	Heat		Semifinal		Final	
Athlete	Event	Time	Rank	Time	Rank	Time	Rank
Mehboob Ali	Men's 400 m	48.37	6	Did not advance			
Najma Parveen	Women's 200 m	26.11	8	Did not advance			

== Judo ==
Pakistan has qualified one judoka for the men's half-heavyweight category (100 kg) at the Games, signifying the nation's Olympic debut in judo. Hussain Shah earned a continental quota spot from the Asian region, as Pakistan's top-ranked judoka outside of direct qualifying position in the IJF World Ranking List of May 30, 2016.

Athlete	Event	Round of 64	Round of 32	Round of 16	Quarterfinals	Semifinals	Repechage	Final / BM	
Athlete	Event	Opposition Result	Opposition Result	Opposition Result	Opposition Result	Opposition Result	Opposition Result	Opposition Result	Rank
Shah Hussain Shah	Men's −100 kg	Bye	Bloshenko (UKR); L 000–100	Did not advance					

== Shooting ==
Pakistan has received two invitations from the Tripartite Commission to send shooters competing in the men's 25 m rapid fire pistol and women's 10 m air rifle, respectively, to the Olympics.

Athlete	Event	Qualification		Final	
Athlete	Event	Points	Rank	Points	Rank
Ghulam Mustafa Bashir	Men's 25 m rapid fire pistol	571	18	Did not advance	
Minhal Sohail	Women's 10 m air rifle	413.2	28	Did not advance	

Qualification Legend: Q = Qualify for the next round; q = Qualify for the bronze medal (shotgun)

== Swimming ==
Pakistan has received a Universality invitation from FINA to send two swimmers (one male and one female) to the Olympics.

Athlete	Event	Heat		Semifinal		Final	
Athlete	Event	Time	Rank	Time	Rank	Time	Rank
Haris Bandey	Men's 400 m freestyle	4:33.13	50	—N/a		Did not advance	
Lianna Swan	Women's 50 m freestyle	29.02	64	Did not advance			
