= Wasim Ahmed =

Pakistani cricketer (born 1992)

Personal information
- Born: 24 December 1992 (age 33); Karachi, Pakistan
- Source: ESPNcricinfo, 8 October 2016

Wasim Ahmed (born 24 December 1992) is a Pakistani cricketer. He made his first-class debut for Karachi Blues in the 2016–17 Quaid-e-Azam Trophy on 7 October 2016.
