= Len Aiyappa =

Indian professional field hockey player

Personal information
- Full name: Len Aiyappa Ballachanda Madappa
- Born: 31 March 1979 (age 47)
- Height: 5 ft 8 in (1.73 m)

Sport
- Sport: Field hockey
- Position: Fullback
Senior career
| Years | Team | Caps | Goals |
| – | BPCL | - | - |
| – | Air India | - | - |
| 2005 | Telekom Malaysia HC | - | - |
| 2005 - 2008 | Bangalore Hi-Fliers | - | - |
| 2012 - present | Karnataka Lions | 12 | 13 |
National team
| Years | Team | Caps | Goals |
| ? - 2005 | India | | - |
- Updated on 17 January 2013

Len Aiyappa (born 31 March 1979) is an Indian field hockey player. He remained one of India's best drag-flickers in the India men's national field hockey team until he retired in 2006. He last played for India during the Sultan Azlan Shah Cup in 2005.

== Early life ==
Aiyappa is born in Virajpet and lives in Bengaluru. He studied in St. Joseph's Boys High School, Bengaluru.

== Career ==
Aiyappa, playing for Karnataka Lions in the inaugural season of the World Series Hockey, became the top scorer for the team and third overall by scoring 13 goals in 12 games. He joined the team on the insistence of Dhanraj Pillay and the coach of Karnataka Lions, Jude Felix and scored a hat-trick in the game against Chandigarh Comets. He also played for Air India in domestic hockey leagues.

He played a crucial role in Bangalore Hifliers winning the fourth edition of the Premier Hockey League at Chandigarh in 2008. He scored the match winner against Chandigarh Dynamos in the third of the best of three finals as Hifliers won 2-1 to lift the trophy. He was also part of the Bangalore Lions team which won the second edition in 2006.

== Personal life ==
He is married.
