= Ji Seong-hwan =

South Korean field hockey player

Personal information
- Born: September 16, 1974 (age 51)
Medal record
Men's field hockey
Representing South Korea
Olympic Games
Silver medal – second place	2000 Sydney	Team
Asian Games
Gold medal – first place	2002 Busan	Team
Asia Cup
Gold medal – first place	1999 Kuala Lumpur

- Ji Seong-hwan
- Hangul: 지성환
- RR: Ji Seonghwan
- MR: Chi Sŏnghwan

Ji Seong-hwan (Korean: 지성환; born September 16, 1974) is a field hockey player from South Korea, who was a member of the Men's National Team that won the silver medal at the 2000 Summer Olympics in Sydney. In the final the Asians were beaten by title holders the Netherlands after penalty strokes. He is nicknamed Long Leg, and also competed at the 2004 Summer Olympics in Athens.
