= Sameer Hussain =

Pakistani field hockey player

Personal information
- Nationality: Pakistani
- Born: 14 February 1982 (age 44)

Sport
- Sport: Field hockey

Sameer Hussain (born 14 February 1982) is a Pakistani field hockey player. He competed in the men's tournament at the 2000 Summer Olympics.
