= Maninderjit Singh Magmar =

Malaysian field hockey player (born 1972)

Personal information
- Nationality: Malaysian
- Born: 17 November 1972 (age 53)

Sport
- Sport: Field hockey

Maninderjit Singh Magmar (born 17 November 1972) is a Malaysian field hockey player. He competed at the 1996 Summer Olympics and the 2000 Summer Olympics.
