= Troy Elder =

Australian field hockey player (born 1977)

Medal record

Representing Australia

Men's field hockey

Olympic Games
| Gold medal – first place | 2004 Athens | Team |
| Bronze medal – third place | 2000 Sydney | Team |

World Cup
| Silver medal – second place | 2002 Kuala Lumpur | Team |
| Silver medal – second place | 2006 Mönchengladbach | Team |

Champions Trophy
| Gold medal – first place | 1999 Brisbane | Team |
| Silver medal – second place | 2001 Rotterdam | Team |
| Silver medal – second place | 2003 Amstelveen | Team |
| Bronze medal – third place | 1998 Lahore | Team |

Commonwealth Games
| Gold medal – first place | 2002 Manchester | Team |

Troy Elder OAM (born 15 October 1977 in Bunbury, Western Australia) is a field hockey striker and midfielder from Australia, who was a member of the Men's National Team that won the golden medal at the 2004 Summer Olympics in Athens. Four years earlier, when Sydney hosted the Olympic Games, Elder finished in third spot with The Kookaburras, as the national team is called.

Elder originated from Bundaberg, Queensland, where he played for the All Blacks Hockey Club. Nicknamed Woody, Elder shot into limelight as a player with the National Junior Squad, that won the Hockey Junior World Cup at Milton Keynes in 1997 against India. After the 1998 Australian Hockey League season with the Queensland Blades, Elder got into the senior National Squad at the 1998 Champions Trophy in Lahore, where Australia won the bronze. He was part of the winning team in the 1999 Champions Trophy at Brisbane.

Just like his countrymen Jay Stacy and Michael Brennan, Elder moved to the Netherlands, where he played club hockey for Eindhoven's Oranje Zwart, with whom he won the Dutch title in the spring of 2005. The price was high, because during the Dutch play-offs he neglected the call from Australia's Head Coach Barry Dancer to come over for a training session with the men's National Team. He therefore had to miss the 2005 Champions Trophy in Chennai and the 2006 Commonwealth Games in Melbourne.

Having retired from international hockey, Elder played club hockey for United Hockey in Brisbane for some time whilst still representing the Queensland Blades. A plumber by profession, he is fond of surfing and fishing.

== International goals ==
| No. | Date | Venue | Opponent | Score | Result | Competition |
|---|---|---|---|---|---|---|
| 1. | 2 November 1998 | Lahore, Pakistan | South Korea | 1–1 | 1–1 | 1998 Men's Hockey Champions Trophy |
| 2. | 3 November 1998 | Lahore, Pakistan | Pakistan | 4–3 | 4–4 | 1998 Men's Hockey Champions Trophy |
| 3. | 13 June 1999 | Brisbane, Australia | Spain | 2–0 | 2–0 | 1999 Men's Hockey Champions Trophy |
| 4. | 14 June 1999 | Brisbane, Australia | Netherlands | 1–0 | 2–1 | 1999 Men's Hockey Champions Trophy |
| 5. | 18 June 1999 | Brisbane, Australia | Pakistan | 1–0 | 1–2 | 1999 Men's Hockey Champions Trophy |
| 6. | 20 June 1999 | Brisbane, Australia | South Korea | 2–0 | 3–1 | 1999 Men's Hockey Champions Trophy |
| 7. | 28 May 2000 | Amstelveen, Netherlands | Spain | 1–1 | 1–1 | 2000 Men's Hockey Champions Trophy |
| 8. | 30 May 2000 | Amstelveen, Netherlands | Great Britain | 1–0 | 3–3 | 2000 Men's Hockey Champions Trophy |
| 9. | 30 May 2000 | Amstelveen, Netherlands | Great Britain | 2–0 | 3–3 | 2000 Men's Hockey Champions Trophy |
| 10. | 30 September 2000 | Sydney, Australia | Pakistan | 1–0 | 6–3 | 2000 Summer Olympics |
| 11. | 30 September 2000 | Sydney, Australia | Pakistan | 2–1 | 6–3 | 2000 Summer Olympics |
| 12. | 30 September 2000 | Sydney, Australia | Pakistan | 5–2 | 6–3 | 2000 Summer Olympics |
| 13. | 2 August 2001 | Kuala Lumpur, Malaysia | Pakistan | 3–1 | 5–3 | 2001 Sultan Azlan Shah Cup |
| 14. | 2 August 2001 | Kuala Lumpur, Malaysia | Pakistan | 4–1 | 5–3 | 2001 Sultan Azlan Shah Cup |
| 15. | 4 August 2001 | Kuala Lumpur, Malaysia | Germany | 1–1 | 2–6 | 2001 Sultan Azlan Shah Cup |
| 16. | 4 August 2001 | Kuala Lumpur, Malaysia | Germany | 2–4 | 2–6 | 2001 Sultan Azlan Shah Cup |
| 17. | 7 August 2001 | Kuala Lumpur, Malaysia | India | 3–2 | 3–2 | 2001 Sultan Azlan Shah Cup |
| 18. | 10 August 2001 | Kuala Lumpur, Malaysia | Malaysia | 3–1 | 7–1 | 2001 Sultan Azlan Shah Cup |
| 19. | 10 August 2001 | Kuala Lumpur, Malaysia | Malaysia | 4–1 | 7–1 | 2001 Sultan Azlan Shah Cup |
| 20. | 10 August 2001 | Kuala Lumpur, Malaysia | Malaysia | 7–1 | 7–1 | 2001 Sultan Azlan Shah Cup |
| 21. | 12 August 2001 | Kuala Lumpur, Malaysia | Pakistan | 1–0 | 4–3 | 2001 Sultan Azlan Shah Cup |
| 22. | 4 November 2001 | Rotterdam, Netherlands | Netherlands | 2–1 | 3–2 | 2001 Men's Hockey Champions Trophy |
| 23. | 7 November 2001 | Rotterdam, Netherlands | England | 2–1 | 3–2 | 2001 Men's Hockey Champions Trophy |
| 24. | 10 November 2001 | Rotterdam, Netherlands | South Korea | 3–1 | 5–3 | 2001 Men's Hockey Champions Trophy |
| 25. | 10 November 2001 | Rotterdam, Netherlands | South Korea | 4–1 | 5–3 | 2001 Men's Hockey Champions Trophy |
| 26. | 24 February 2002 | Kuala Lumpur, Malaysia | Malaysia | 2–0 | 3–0 | 2002 Men's Hockey World Cup |
| 27. | 24 February 2002 | Kuala Lumpur, Malaysia | Malaysia | 3–0 | 3–0 | 2002 Men's Hockey World Cup |
| 28. | 27 February 2002 | Kuala Lumpur, Malaysia | Poland | 4–1 | 5–1 | 2002 Men's Hockey World Cup |
| 29. | 4 March 2002 | Kuala Lumpur, Malaysia | South Korea | 2–0 | 4–2 | 2002 Men's Hockey World Cup |
| 30. | 9 March 2002 | Kuala Lumpur, Malaysia | Germany | 1–0 | 1–2 | 2002 Men's Hockey World Cup |
| 31. | 27 July 2002 | Manchester, England | New Zealand | 3–1 | 6–1 | 2002 Commonwealth Games |
| 32. | 27 July 2002 | Manchester, England | New Zealand | 4–1 | 6–1 | 2002 Commonwealth Games |
| 33. | 30 July 2002 | Manchester, England | Barbados | 6–0 | 20–1 | 2002 Commonwealth Games |
| 34. | 30 July 2002 | Manchester, England | Barbados | 8–0 | 20–1 | 2002 Commonwealth Games |
| 35. | 30 July 2002 | Manchester, England | Barbados | 19–1 | 20–1 | 2002 Commonwealth Games |
| 36. | 4 August 2002 | Manchester, England | New Zealand | 1–0 | 5–2 | 2002 Commonwealth Games |
| 37. | 16 August 2003 | Amstelveen, Netherlands | Pakistan | 2–3 | 4–3 | 2003 Men's Hockey Champions Trophy |
| 38. | 19 August 2003 | Amstelveen, Netherlands | India | 3–0 | 4–1 | 2003 Men's Hockey Champions Trophy |
| 39. | 23 August 2003 | Amstelveen, Netherlands | Argentina | 5–1 | 8–3 | 2003 Men's Hockey Champions Trophy |
| 40. | 24 August 2003 | Amstelveen, Netherlands | Netherlands | 2–2 | 4–2 | 2003 Men's Hockey Champions Trophy |
| 41. | 20 September 2003 | Wellington, New Zealand | New Zealand | 1–1 | 4–3 | 2003 Men's Oceania Cup |
| 42. | 20 September 2003 | Wellington, New Zealand | New Zealand | 2–2 | 4–3 | 2003 Men's Oceania Cup |
| 43. | 20 September 2003 | Wellington, New Zealand | New Zealand | 3–3 | 4–3 | 2003 Men's Oceania Cup |
| 44. | 21 September 2003 | Wellington, New Zealand | New Zealand | 3–1 | 4–1 | 2003 Men's Oceania Cup |
| 45. | 10 January 2004 | Kuala Lumpur, Malaysia | South Korea | 1–0 | 1–1 | 2004 Sultan Azlan Shah Cup |
| 46. | 12 January 2004 | Kuala Lumpur, Malaysia | Malaysia | 2–1 | 3–2 | 2004 Sultan Azlan Shah Cup |
| 47. | 12 January 2004 | Kuala Lumpur, Malaysia | Malaysia | 3–1 | 3–2 | 2004 Sultan Azlan Shah Cup |
| 48. | 13 January 2004 | Kuala Lumpur, Malaysia | India | 2–2 | 4–2 | 2004 Sultan Azlan Shah Cup |
| 49. | 18 January 2004 | Kuala Lumpur, Malaysia | Pakistan | 4–2 | 4–3 | 2004 Sultan Azlan Shah Cup |
| 50. | 15 August 2004 | Athens, Greece | New Zealand | 1–0 | 4–1 | 2004 Summer Olympics |
| 51. | 19 August 2004 | Athens, Greece | India | 1–1 | 4–3 | 2004 Summer Olympics |
| 52. | 25 August 2004 | Athens, Greece | Spain | 1–0 | 6–3 | 2004 Summer Olympics |
| 53. | 18 June 2006 | Ipoh, Malaysia | India | 1–0 | 4–1 | 2006 Sultan Azlan Shah Cup |
| 54. | 22 July 2006 | Terrassa, Spain | Pakistan | 2–1 | 3–2 | 2006 Men's Hockey Champions Trophy |
| 55. | 22 July 2006 | Terrassa, Spain | Pakistan | 3–2 | 3–2 | 2006 Men's Hockey Champions Trophy |
| 56. | 23 July 2006 | Terrassa, Spain | Netherlands | 1–0 | 1–1 | 2006 Men's Hockey Champions Trophy |
