= Mohamed Madzli Ikmar =

Malaysian field hockey player (born 1979)

Personal information
- Nationality: Malaysian
- Born: 8 December 1979 (age 46)

Sport
- Sport: Field hockey
Medal record
Men's field hockey
Representing Malaysia
Asian Games
Silver medal – second place	2010 Guangzhou	Team
Bronze medal – third place	2002 Busan	Team
Commonwealth Games
Silver medal – second place	1998 Kuala Lumpur	Team

Mohamed Madzli Ikmar (born 8 December 1979) is a Malaysian field hockey player. He competed in the men's tournament at the 2000 Summer Olympics.
