= Sandeep Michael =

Indian field hockey player (1985–2018)

Personal information
- Born: 23 June 1985 Bangalore, Karnataka, India
- Died: 23 November 2018 (aged 33) Bangalore, Karnataka, India

Sport
- Sport: Field hockey
- Position: Forward
National team
Years	Team	Caps	Goals
–	India		-
Medal record
Men's field hockey
Representing India
Asia Cup
Gold medal – first place	2003 Kuala Lumpur	Team

Sandeep Michael (23 June 1985 – 23 November 2018) was an Indian field hockey player who played as a forward for the national team.

Michael won the Most Promising Player award at the 2003 Men's Hockey Asia Cup which India won. He captained the national junior team to gold in the 2004 Men's Hockey Junior Asia Cup. He was employed with Air India.

Sandeep Michael died on 23 November 2018 in Bangalore after a brief illness, wherein he had slipped into a coma.
