= Bevan Hari =

New Zealand field hockey player

Personal information
- Born: 4 January 1975 (age 51)
Medal record
Men's field hockey
Representing New Zealand
Commonwealth Games
Silver medal – second place	2002 Manchester	Team competition
Champions Challenge
Silver medal – second place	2007 Boom	Team competition

Bevan David Hari (born 4 January 1975 in Rotorua) is a field hockey striker from New Zealand, who finished in sixth position with the Men's National Team, nicknamed Black Sticks, at the 2004 Summer Olympics in Athens, Greece.
