= Lee Jung-seon =

South Korean hockey player

Personal information
- Nationality: South Korean
- Born: 15 February 1979 (age 47)

Sport
- Sport: Field hockey
Medal record
Men's field hockey
Representing South Korea
Asia Cup
Bronze medal – third place	2003 Kuala Lumpur

Lee Jung-seon (born 15 February 1979) is a South Korean former field hockey player. He competed in the men's tournament at the 2004 Summer Olympics.
