= Ibrahim Suhaimi =

Malaysian field hockey player (born 1979)

Personal information
- Nationality: Malaysian
- Born: 3 October 1979 (age 46)

Sport
- Sport: Field hockey

Ibrahim Suhaimi (born 3 October 1979) is a Malaysian field hockey player. He competed in the men's tournament at the 2000 Summer Olympics.
