= Benjamin Taylor (field hockey) =

Australian field hockey player

Ben Taylor
Personal information
- Born: 22 March 1976 (age 50) Canberra, Australian Capital Territory

Sport
- Sport: Field hockey
- Position: Midfield
Senior career
Years	Team	Caps	Goals
1993–2008	Canberra Lakers	-	-
National team
Years	Team	Caps	Goals
1997	Australia U–21	22	(8)
1998–2004	Australia	83	(15)
Medal record
Men's field hockey
Representing Australia
Commonwealth Games
Gold medal – first place	2002 Manchester	Team
FIH Champions Trophy
Silver medal – second place	2001 Rotterdam	Team
Bronze medal – third place	1998 Lahore	Team
FIH Junior World Cup
Gold medal – first place	1997 Milton Keynes	Team

Ben Taylor (born 22 March 1976) is a former field hockey player from Australia, who played as a midfielder.

== Personal life ==
Ben Taylor was born and raised in Canberra, Australian Capital Territory.

Taylor's sister, Sarah, also played representative hockey for Australia, as a member of the Hockeyroos.

== Career ==
=== AHL ===
Ben Taylor was a member of the Canberra Lakers team for fifteen years. He debuted in the National Hockey League's inaugural season in 1993, where the team finished in sixth place.

Taylor's best performance with the Lakers was in 1998, where the team finished second.

=== National teams ===
==== Under–21 ====
Ben Taylor was first named in the Australia U–21 team in 1996.

In 1997, he was a member of the gold winning team at the FIH Junior World Cup in Milton Keynes.

==== Kookaburras ====
Following a string of solid performances at National Australian Championships and in the NHL, Taylor was named in the Kookaburras team in 1998.

Throughout his career, Taylor recorded 83 caps with the senior national team, and scoring on 15 occasions.

In 2002, he won his first gold medal for Australia at the 2002 Commonwealth Games in Manchester. This came after winning both silver and bronze at the 2001 and 1998 FIH Champions Trophies, respectively.
