= Sin Seok-gyo =

South Korean hockey player

Personal information
- Nationality: South Korean
- Born: 20 September 1971 (age 54) Seoul, South Korea

Sport
- Sport: Field hockey
Medal record
Men's field hockey
Representing South Korea
Asian Games
Gold medal – first place	1994 Hiroshima	Team
Gold medal – first place	2002 Busan	Team

Sin Seok-gyo (born 20 September 1971) is a South Korean field hockey player. He competed in the men's tournament at the 1996 Summer Olympics.
