= Imran Yousuf =

Pakistani field hockey player (born 1978)

Personal information
- Nationality: Pakistani
- Born: 23 December 1978 (age 47)

Sport
- Sport: Field hockey

Imran Yousuf (born 23 December 1978) is a Pakistani field hockey player. He competed in the men's tournament at the 2000 Summer Olympics.
