= Yeo Woon-kon =

South korean hockey player

Personal information
- Born: 4 September 1974 (age 51)
Medal record
Men's field hockey
Representing South Korea
Olympic Games
Silver medal – second place	2000 Sydney	Team
Asian Games
Gold medal – first place	2002 Busan	Team
Gold medal – first place	2006 Doha	Team
Silver medal – second place	1998 Bangkok	Team
Asia Cup
Gold medal – first place	1999 Kuala Lumpur
Champions Trophy
Silver medal – second place	1999 Brisbane
Bronze medal – third place	2000 Amstelveen

Yeo Woon-kon (born 4 September 1974) is a field hockey player from South Korea, who was a member of the Men's National Team that won the silver medal at the 2000 Summer Olympics in Sydney. In the final the South Koreans were beaten by the Dutch title holders after penalty strokes. Yeo also competed at the 2004, 2008 and 2012 Summer Olympics.
