= Tariq Imran =

Pakistani field hockey player

Personal information
- Full name: Muhammad Tariq Imran
- Born: 3 February 1977 (age 49) Gojra, Punjab, Pakistan

Sport
- Sport: Field hockey
- Position: Left Full Back
- Club: PTCL
Senior career
Years	Team	Caps	Goals
1996–present	Railways	-	-
–	Habib Bank	-	-
–	Pakistan Steels	-	-
2004–2008	Mopp Hockey Club (Netherlands)	-	-
–	Calcup (USA)	-	-
National team
Years	Team	Caps	Goals
1996–present	Pakistan	216	(5)

Tariq Imran (born 2 March 1977) is a Pakistani former field hockey player and Olympian. He was born in Gojra district, Toba Tek Singh. He is the son of hockey player Abdul Rehman Bhutta, and his brothers Liaqat Ali Bhutta and Asadullah Bhutta were also national-level hockey players.
