= Kim Kyung-seok =

Korean field hockey player

- Hangul: 김경석
- RR: Gim Gyeongseok
- MR: Kim Kyŏngsŏk

Kim Kyung-seok
Medal record

Men's field hockey

Representing South Korea

Olympic Games
Silver medal – second place	2000 Sydney	Team

Asian Games
Gold medal – first place	2002 Busan	Team

Champions Trophy
Silver medal – second place	1999 Brisbane	Team
Bronze medal – third place	2000 Amstelveen	Team

Kim Kyung-seok (born 23 June 1972) is a South Korean former field hockey player who competed in the 2000 Summer Olympics and in the 2004 Summer Olympics.
