= Krishnamurthy Gobinathan =

Malaysian field hockey player (born 1978)

Personal information
- Born: 13 January 1978 (age 48)

Sport
- Sport: Field hockey
Coaching career
- Years: Team
- 2021-present: Bangladesh
Medal record
Men's field hockey
Representing Malaysia
Asian Games
Bronze medal – third place	2002 Busan	Team
Commonwealth Games
Silver medal – second place	1998 Kuala Lumpur	Team

Krishnamurthy Gobinathan (born 13 January 1978) is a Malaysian field hockey player. He competed in the men's tournament at the 2000 Summer Olympics. He is currently working as the head coach of Bangladesh national field hockey team.
