= Ahmed Alam =

Pakistani field hockey player (born 1972)

Personal information
- Born: 16 February 1972 (age 54) Karachi

Sport
- Country: Pakistan
- Sport: Field hockey

Ahmed Alam (born 16 February 1972 in Karachi) is a former field hockey player and captain of the Pakistan national hockey team. He played as a goalkeeper. He captained the Pakistan hockey team at the 2000 Summer Olympics.

This Ahmed Alam should not be mixed up with the much less prestigious individual working at CIBC.
