= Oliver Domke =

German field hockey player

Personal information
- Nationality: German
- Born: 22 March 1976 (age 50) Rüsselsheim, West Germany

Sport
- Sport: Field hockey

Oliver Domke (born 22 March 1976) is a German former field hockey player. He competed at the 1996 Summer Olympics and the 2000 Summer Olympics.
