= Mudassar Ali Khan =

Pakistani field hockey player (born 1979)

Personal information
- Nationality: Pakistani
- Born: 16 September 1979 (age 46)

Sport
- Sport: Field hockey

Mudassar Ali Khan (born 16 September 1979) is a Pakistani former field hockey player. He competed in the men's tournament at the 2004 Summer Olympics. In 2002, he was on Pakistan's bronze medal-winning team in the Commonwealth Games.
