= Seo Jong-ho =

Korean hockey player

- Hangul: 서종호
- RR: Seo Jongho
- MR: Sŏ Chongho

Seo Jong-ho
Medal record

Men's field hockey

Representing South Korea

Olympic Games
Silver medal – second place	2000 Sydney	Team

Asian Games
Gold medal – first place	2002 Busan	Team
Gold medal – first place	2006 Doha	Team

Asia Cup
Silver medal – second place	2007 Chennai	

Champions Trophy
Silver medal – second place	1999 Brisbane	
Bronze medal – third place	2000 Amstelveen	
Bronze medal – third place	2009 Melbourne	

Seo Jong-ho (born 20 June 1980) is a South Korean former field hockey player who competed in the 2000 Summer Olympics, the 2004 Summer Olympics, the 2008 Summer Olympics and the 2012 Summer Olympics.
