= Ghazanfar Ali =

Pakistani field hockey player (born 1980)

Personal information
- Born: 2 February 1980 (age 46) Arif Wala, Punjab, Pakistan
- Height: 175 cm (5 ft 9 in)
- Weight: 72 kg (159 lb)

Sport
- Sport: Field hockey
National team
Years	Team	Caps	Goals
?	Pakistan		-
Coaching career
- Years: Team
- 2022-present: Ghana hockey team

Ghazanfar Ali (born 2 February 1980) is a field hockey coach and former player from Pakistan. He has been a former captain of the Pakistan men's national team. He competed in the men's tournament at the 2004 Summer Olympics.

In July 2022, he was named as the head coach of the Ghana hockey team for the 2022 Commonwealth Games.
