= Dilawar Hussain (field hockey) =

Pakistani field hockey player (born 1979)

Personal information
- Nationality: Pakistani
- Born: 1 April 1979 (age 47)

Sport
- Sport: Field hockey

Dilawar Hussain (born 1 April 1979) is a Pakistani former field hockey player. He competed in the men's tournament at the 2004 Summer Olympics.
