= Kuhan Shanmuganathan =

Malaysian field hockey player

Personal information
- Born: 23 July 1976 (age 50) Negeri Sembilan, Malaysia
- Height: 180 cm (5 ft 11 in)

Sport
- Sport: Field hockey
- Position: Defender
Senior career
Years	Team	Caps	Goals
1992–1996	Yayasan Negeri Sembilan HC	-	-
1997	Petaling Jaya Municipal Council	-	-
1997	Limburg HC	-	-
1998	Petaling Jaya Municipal Council	-	-
1999	Bank Simpanan Nasional HC	-	-
2000–2005	Sapura HC	-	-
2005	Bangalore Hi-Fliers	-	-
2005–2012	Sapura HC	-	-
National team
Years	Team	Caps	Goals
1996–2007	Malaysia	341	-
Medal record
Men's field hockey
Representing Malaysia
Asian Games
Bronze medal – third place	2002 Busan	Team
Commonwealth Games
Silver medal – second place	1998 Kuala Lumpur	Team
Bronze medal – third place	2006 Melbourne	Team
Southeast Asian Games
Gold medal – first place	1999 Bandar Seri Bengawan	Team
Gold medal – first place	2001 Kuala Lumpur	Team
Gold medal – first place	2007 Korat	Team

Kuhan Shanmuganathan (born 23 July 1976) is a retired field hockey player from Port Dickson, Negeri Sembilan, Malaysia. Kuhan is known as one of the penalty corner specialist.

== Career ==
=== Club ===
Kuhan made his debut in the Malaysia Hockey League for Yayasan Negeri Sembilan in 1992. He won two league titles in 1995 and 1996. After his stint in Negeri Sembilan, Kuhan joined Petaling Jaya City Council in 1997 and won a league title. In the same year he went on three-month stints with clubs in Germany. He played for Limburg HC. Two years later, he featured for Bank Simpanan Nasional (BSN) and won another league title.

In 2000, he played for Sapura and stayed there for 12 years. It proved to be a fruitful union as Sapura went on to win four titles. They were double champions in 2005 and clinched the league title in 2004 and overall Cup in 2006. In 2005, Kuhan joined Bangalore Hi-Fliers that play in India Hockey Premier League.

Kuhan also emerged the Malaysia Hockey League’s top scorer three times in 1997, 1999 and 2003. He currently served as team manager of Sapura.

=== International ===
Kuhan won 341 caps for Malaysia. He has played in competitive competitions such as the World Cup, Olympics, Champions Challenge, Commonwealth Games, Asian Games and Asia Cup.

He also the Malaysia hockey team skipper for six years since taking over from Mirnawan Nawawi in 2000. Kuhan announce his retirement after Malaysian Hockey Federation's decision to drop him from the national training squad in early 2007. He return from his retirement in 2007 Southeast Asian Games. It is his last appearances for the Malaysia hockey team.
