= Ali Raza (field hockey) =

Pakistani field hockey player (born 1976)

Personal information
- Nationality: Pakistani
- Born: 10 November 1976 (age 49)

Sport
- Sport: Field hockey

Ali Raza (born 10 November 1976) is a Pakistani field hockey player. He competed at the 2000 Summer Olympics and the 2004 Summer Olympics.
