= Dhanraj Pillay =

Indian field hockey player

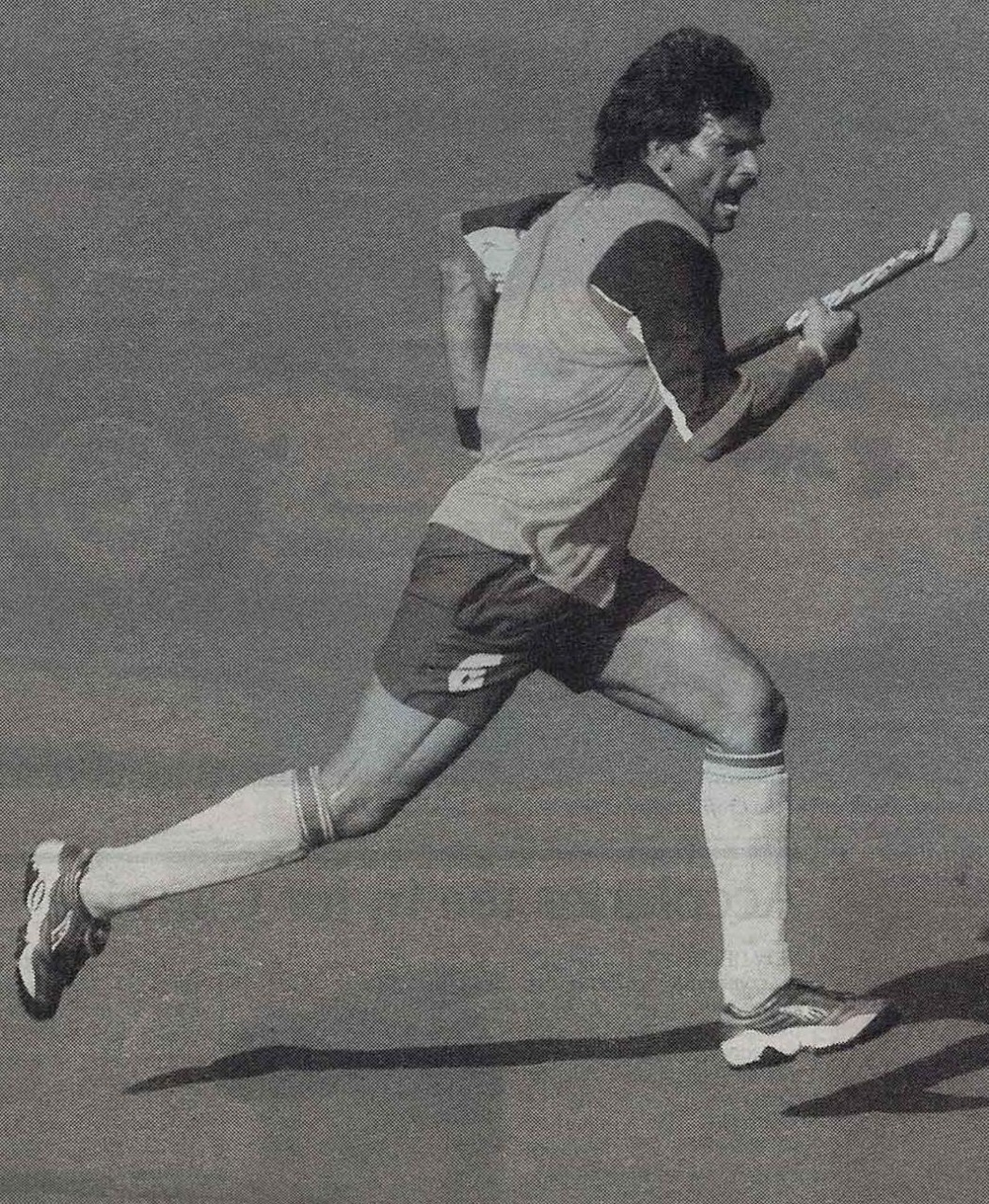
- Pillay in 2010

Personal information
- Full name: Dhanraj Pillay
- Born: 16 July 1968 (age 58) Khadki, Pune, Maharastra, India
- Height: 5 ft 8 in (1.73 m)

Sport
- Sport: Field hockey
- Position: Forward
Senior career
Years	Team	Caps	Goals
1992–1993	Indian Gymkhana	78	200
1993	HC Lyon	-	-
1994–1997	Selangor HA	7	8
1997–1999	Abahani Ltd.	-	-
2000	HTC Stuttgart Kickers	-	-
2000–2001	Bank Simpanan Nasional HC	-	-
2002	Arthur Andersen HC	-	-
2002	Singapore Hockey Federation	-	-
2006–2008	Maratha Warriors	-	-
2012	Karnataka Lions	6	1
2004	Ernst & Young HC	-	-
2005	Telekom Malaysia HC	-	-
National team
Years	Team	Caps	Goals
1989–2004	India	339	(170)
Medal record
Representing India
Men's field hockey
Champions Challenge
Gold medal – first place	2001 Kuala Lumpur	Team
Asia Cup
Gold medal – first place	2003 Kuala Lumpur	Team
Silver medal – second place	1989 Delhi	Team
Silver medal – second place	1994 Hiroshima	Team
Bronze medal – third place	1999 Kuala Lumpur	Team
Asian Games
Gold medal – first place	1998 Bangkok	Team
Silver medal – second place	1990 Beijing	Team
Silver medal – second place	1994 Hiroshima	Team
Silver medal – second place	2002 Busan	Team

Dhanraj Pillay (born 16 July 1968) is a retired Indian field hockey player and former captain of the India national team. He also looks after the Air India Sports Promotion Board as a Joint Secretary based in Mumbai. For the last 5 years, Dhanraj is overseeing the SAG Hockey Academy in Gujarat funded by the Gujarat Government. He is widely regarded as one of the best Indian players of hockey.

Pillay born to a Tamil family made his debut in 1989 with the national team and in a career spanning over 15 years, appeared for India in four Olympic Games, World Cups and Champion Trophies each. He made 339 appearances for the national team and is recorded, unofficially, to have scored 170 goals. He also played for clubs in countries such as Malaysia, France, England and Germany. Recognizing his achievements, he was awarded the Padma Shri by the government of India in 2000.

== International career ==
Dhanraj Pillay, whose career spanned from December 1989 to August 2004, played 339 international matches. The Indian Hockey Federation did not keep official statistics for the goals scored. There is no credible information on the number of international goals scored by Dhanraj. He scored around 171 goals in his career, according to both him and leading statisticians in the world. He is the only player to have played in four Olympics (1992, 1996, 2000, and 2004), four World Cups (1990, 1994, 1998, and 2002), four Champions Trophies (1995, 1996, 2002, and 2003), and four Asian Games (1990, 1994, 1998, and 2002). India won the Asian Games (1998) and Asia Cup (2003) under his captaincy. He was also the highest goal scorer in the Bangkok Asian Games and was the only Indian player to figure in the World Eleven side during the 1994 World Cup in Sydney.

== Club Hockey ==
He has also played for foreign clubs like the Indian Gymkhana (London), HC Lyon (France), BSN HC & Telekom Malaysia HC (Malaysia), Abahani Limited, HTC Stuttgart Kickers (Germany) and Khalsa Sports Club (Hong Kong). Towards the end of his career, Dhanraj played in the Premier Hockey League for the Maratha Warriors for two seasons.

Dhanraj Pillay turned up for the Karnataka Lions in the World Series Hockey being played in India. He scored two goals for his team, captained by ex-India captain Arjun Halappa. He also played for Indian Airlines in Beighton Cup. He is currently the coach of the same team.

== Awards ==
He is the recipient of India's highest sporting honour, the Major Dhyan Chand Khel Ratna award for the year 1999–2000. He was awarded the Padma Shri, a civilian award in 2001. He was the captain of the 1998 Asian Games and 2003 Asia Cup winning hockey team. He was awarded the player of the tournament award in the 2002 Champions trophy held at Cologne, Germany. In 2017, East Bengal Club conferred Pillay with Bharat Gaurav award.

== Controversies ==
Dhanraj is often described as mercurial and has had his share of controversies. Time and again, he has vented this ire against the Hockey Management. He was not selected for the Indian team after the triumph at the Bangkok Asiad. The official reason given was that Dhanraj and 6 other senior players were rested. But it was largely seen as a retaliation for his outburst against the management for improper reception and non-payment of match fees. He protested against the low team stipend on overseas tours before the 1998 series against Pakistan. On receipt of the Khel Ratna, Pillay commented, "The award will help erase some bitter memories".

His plans to start a hockey academy at Mumbai have not taken off fully as Mumbai Hockey Association has refused to allow its astroturf facility to be used for training. He said that the academy will begin to function on October 1 but there are no signs of it right now.

== Biography ==
Pillay's biography, Forgive Me Amma, written by journalist Sundeep Misra, who tracked his career for over two decades, released in 2007.
