= Shabbir Muhammad =

Pakistani field hockey player

Personal information
- Nationality: Pakistani
- Born: 3 March 1978 (age 48)

Sport
- Sport: Field hockey

Shabbir Muhammad (born 3 March 1978) is a Pakistani former field hockey player. He competed in the men's tournament at the 2004 Summer Olympics.
