= Kashif Jawad =

Pakistani field hockey player

Personal information
- Born: 7 February 1981 (age 45) Karachi, Pakistan

Sport
- Sport: Field hockey
Senior career
Years	Team	Caps	Goals
1998–2014	Port Qasim Authority	-	-
2002	BS Nasional	-	-
2005	Maratha Warriors	-	-
National team
Years	Team	Caps	Goals
1999–2005	Pakistan	180	(86)

Kashif Jawad (born February 7, 1981, in Karachi) is a former field hockey player who represented Pakistan in two Olympic Games in 2000 and 2004. A stalwart forward for Pakistan during the late 1990s and early 2000s, Jawad was the team's prime center forward during his career. His career ended abruptly after he was dropped from the team in mid-2005 due to fitness issues and drop in performance after the death of his father the same year which impacted his game; he was not selected for the team afterwards. He continued playing for Port Qasim in Pakistan National Hockey Championship and played professional leagues in India and Malaysia.
