= 2020 Sultan Azlan Shah Cup =

Cancelled field hockey tournament

Tournament details
- Host country: Malaysia
- City: Ipoh
- Dates: Cancelled
- Teams: 6 (from 3 confederations)
- Venue: Azlan Shah Stadium

The 2020 Sultan Azlan Shah Cup was scheduled to be the 29th edition of the Sultan Azlan Shah Cup, the annual men's international invitational field hockey tournament in Malaysia. It was scheduled to be held in April 2020 at the Azlan Shah Stadium in Ipoh, Malaysia. Following the COVID-19 pandemic the tournament was postponed to be held from 24 September to 3 October 2020. On 2 May 2020 the tournament was officially cancelled.

== Teams ==
Pakistan were the first team to confirm their participation in the tournament. The other teams were announced on 20 January 2020.

Team	FIH Ranking	Appearance	Last appearance	Previous best performance
Australia		18th	2018	1st (1983, 1998, 2004, 2005, 2007, 2011, 2013, 2014, 2016, 2018)
Canada		10th	2019	4th (1995, 1999, 2019)
Japan		5th	2019	5th (2019)
Malaysia		29th	2019	2nd (1985, 2007, 2009, 2013, 2014)
Pakistan		21st	2016	1st (1999, 2000, 2003)
South Korea		21st	2019	1st (1996, 2010, 2019)
