= 2026 Sultan Azlan Shah Cup =

Malaysian men's field hockey tournament

Tournament details
- Host country: Malaysia
- City: Ipoh
- Dates: 20–28 November 2026
- Teams: 6 (from 3 confederations)
- Venue: Azlan Shah Stadium

Tournament statistics
- Matches played: 6
- Goals scored: 35 (5.83 per match)
- Top scorer: (Malaysia) Faizal Saari (5 goals)
All statistics are correct as of 21 November 2026


The 2026 Sultan Azlan Shah Cup is the 32nd edition of the Sultan Azlan Shah Cup, the annual men's invitational international field hockey tournament hosted by Malaysia. It is being held at the Azlan Shah Stadium in Ipoh, Malaysia.

The defending champions, Belgium are not participating in this edition.

== Teams ==
The following six teams were invited by the Malaysian Hockey Confederation to participate in the tournament. USA made their first appearance in the tournament history.

Team	FIH Ranking	Appearance	Last appearance	Previous best performance
Australia	3	19th	2018	Champions (1983, 1998, 2004, 2005, 2007, 2011, 2013, 2014, 2016, 2018)
Canada	19	12th	2025	4th place (1995, 1999, 2019)
Malaysia	14	32nd	2025	Champions (2022)
Pakistan	12	23rd	2024	Champions (1999, 2000, 2003)
South Korea	20	24th	2025	Champions (1996, 2010, 2019)
United States	26	1st		

== Squads ==
Australia
1. Lachlan Sharp
3. Dylan Downey
4. Lachlan Rogers
5. Cooper Burns
6. Anand Gupte (C)
7. Nathan Ephraums
11. Ian Grobbelaar
12. Jed Snowden (GK)
16. Timothy Howard (C)
19. Craig Marais
21. Jack Welch
24. Cambell Geddes
25. Nathan Czinner
26. James Collins
30. Davis Atkin
31. Magnus McCausland (GK)
58. Matthew Hawthorne
59. Duncan Jackson
Canada
3. Satpreet Dhadda
4. Roopkanwar Dhillon
6. Avjot Buttar
7. Matthew Sarmento (C)
9. Robin Thind
10. Jude Nicholson
13. Brendan Guraliuk
14. Manveer Jhamat
15. Sean Davis
18. Rowan Childs
19. Gavin Bains
21. Kirin Robinson
22. Jyoth Sidhu
25. Harbir Sidhu
26. Sam Cabral
32. Zachary Coombs (GK)
33. Thomson Harris
34. Kiefer McNaughton (GK)
Malaysia
6. Marhan Jalil (C)
6. Nabil Yusof
7. Fitri Saari
10. Faizal Saari
12. Adam Johari
15. Shello Silverius
15. Mohammad Rahuul
16. Zaimi Mat Deris (GK)
18. Faiz Jali
20. Ashran Hamsani
21. Hafizuddin Othman (GK)
23. Abu Kamal Azrai
24. Aiman Rozemi
26. Muhajir Abdu Rauf
27. Shafiq Hassan
29. Amirul Azahar
30. Faris Harizan
31. Azimuddin Kamaruddin
35. Andywalfian Jeffrynus
46. Nur Aqilrullah Che
Pakistan
1. Waqar Ali (GK)
2. Muhammad Abdullah
5. Sufyan Khan
7. Moin Shakeel
8. Waheed Rana
9. Hannan Shahid
10. Zikriya Hayat
11. Arshad Liaqat
13. Adeel Latif
14. Ahmad Nadeem
15. Ghazanfar Ali
16. Ammad Butt
17. Muhammad Hammadudin
18. Abdul Rehman
24. Umar Mustafa
27. Abu Mahmood (C)
31. Ali Raza (GK)
35. Muhammad Ammad
South Korea
2. Park Geun-woo
6. Go Soung-hoon
8. Rim Jin-kang
9. Son Da-in
11. Chon Se-min
16. Moon Eun-taek (GK)
17. Yoo Hyo-guk
18. Kong Yoon-ho
19. Lee Min-hyeok
22. Yu Seung-chul
23. Song Hae-seong
24. Kim Hyeong-jin (C)
27. Cheon Ming-yu
30. Lee Seung-woo
31. Kim Jin-kyeong
32. Kim Jae-han (GK)
49. Choi Chan-kyu
51. Lee Hye-seung
United States
1. Jonathan Klages (GK)
2. Sekayi Charasika
5. Patrick Harris
6. Wyatt Katz
8. Jatin Sharma
10. Alberto Montilla
11. Marius Leser
12. Ajai Dhadwal
14. Aki Käppeler (C)
15. Kei Käppeler
17. Christian DeAngelis
21. Henzor Motta
29. Emil Collins (GK)
30. Michael Mendoza
31. Liam Hawley
32. Mehtab Grewal
33. Jack Heldens
36. Doug Allison

== Preliminary round ==
All times are local (UTC+8)

=== Standings ===
Pos	Team	Pld	W	D	L	GF	GA	GD	Pts	Qualification
1	Australia	2	2	0	0	12	2	+10	6	Final
2	Malaysia (H)	2	2	0	0	9	0	+9	6	Final
3	Pakistan	2	2	0	0	10	2	+8	6	Third place match
4	United States	2	0	0	2	2	10	−8	0	Third place match
5	South Korea	2	0	0	2	1	10	−9	0	Fifth place match
6	Canada	2	0	0	2	1	11	−10	0	Fifth place match

Updated to match(es) played on 21 November 2026. Source: FIH
Rules for classification: 1) points; 2) matches won; 3) goal difference; 4) goals for; 5) head-to-head result; 6) field goals for.
(H) Hosts

=== Fixtures ===
20 November 2026
15:00

Australia	5–1	United States
Geddes 3'; Ephraums 11', 15', 49'; Welch 39'	Report	Grewal 43'

Umpires:
Kim Jiyong (KOR)
Liu Xiaoying (CHN)

20 November 2026
17:15

Pakistan	5–1	Canada
Sufyan 18', 48', 53'; M. Ammad 37'; Shahid 52'	Report	Robinson 45'

Umpires:
Ahmad Berhaumidin (MAS)
Erika Barbera (USA)

20 November 2026
19:30

Malaysia	3–0	South Korea
Azrai 36'; Kamaruddin 38'; Fa. Saari 56'	Report

Umpires:
Yaser Khurshid (PAK)
Ravdeep Sethi (HKG)

21 November 2026
15:00

United States	1–5	Pakistan
Charasika 31'	Report	Rana 18'; Sufyan 21'; M. Ammad 32'; Mahmood 46'; Shahid 58'

Umpires:
Muhamad Noor (MAS)
Pambavasan Manikandan (CAN)

21 November 2026
17:15

Australia	7–1	South Korea
Jackson 8', 39'; Ephraums 17'; Geddes 20'; Grobbelaar 27'; Burns 50'; Hawthorne 53'	Report	Kong 4'

Umpires:
Ilanggo Kanabathu (MAS)
Yaser Khurshid (PAK)

21 November 2026
19:30

Malaysia	6–0	Canada
Fa. Saari 2', 35', 49', 57'; Azrai 23'; Azahar 28'	Report

Umpires:
Oliver Chauhan (AUS)
Liu Xiaoying (CHN)

23 November 2026
15:00

Canada	v	South Korea
	Report

Umpires:
Oliver Chauhan (AUS)
Erika Barbera (USA)

23 November 2026
17:15

Pakistan	v	Australia
	Report

Umpires:
Ilanggo Kanabathu (MAS)
Kim Jiyong (KOR)

23 November 2026
19:30

United States	v	Malaysia
	Report

Umpires:
Pambavasan Manikandan (CAN)
Ravdeep Sethi (HKG)

24 November 2026
15:00

South Korea	v	Pakistan
	Report

24 November 2026
17:15

Canada	v	United States
	Report

24 November 2026
19:30

Malaysia	v	Australia
	Report

26 November 2026
15:00

Australia	v	Canada

26 November 2026
17:15

South Korea	v	United States

26 November 2026
19:30

Malaysia	v	Pakistan

== Classification round ==
=== Fifth and sixth place ===
28 November 2026
15:00

5th RR	v	6th RR

=== Third and fourth place ===
28 November 2026
17:30

3rd RR	v	4th RR

=== Final ===
28 November 2026
20:00

1st RR	v	2nd RR

== Statistics ==
=== Goalscorers ===
There have been 35 goals scored in 6 matches, for an average of 5.83 goals per match (as of 21 November 2026).

5 goals

- (Malaysia) Faizal Saari

4 goals

- (Australia) Nathan Ephraums
- (Pakistan) Sufyan Khan

2 goals

- (Australia) Cambell Geddes
- (Australia) Duncan Jackson
- (Malaysia) Abu Kamal Azrai
- (Pakistan) Muhammad Ammad
- (Pakistan) Hannan Shahid

1 goal

- (Australia) Cooper Burns
- (Australia) Ian Grobbelaar
- (Australia) Matthew Hawthorne
- (Australia) Jack Welch
- (Canada) Kirin Robinson
- (Malaysia) Amirul Azahar
- (Malaysia) Azimuddin Kamaruddin
- (Pakistan) Abu Mahmood
- (Pakistan) Waheed Rana
- (South Korea) Kong Yoon-ho
- (United States) Sekayi Charasika
- (United States) Mehtab Grewal

Source: FIH

== See also ==
- 2026 Sultan of Johor Cup
