= India–Malaysia field hockey rivalry =

International sports rivalry

India vs Malaysia Hockey
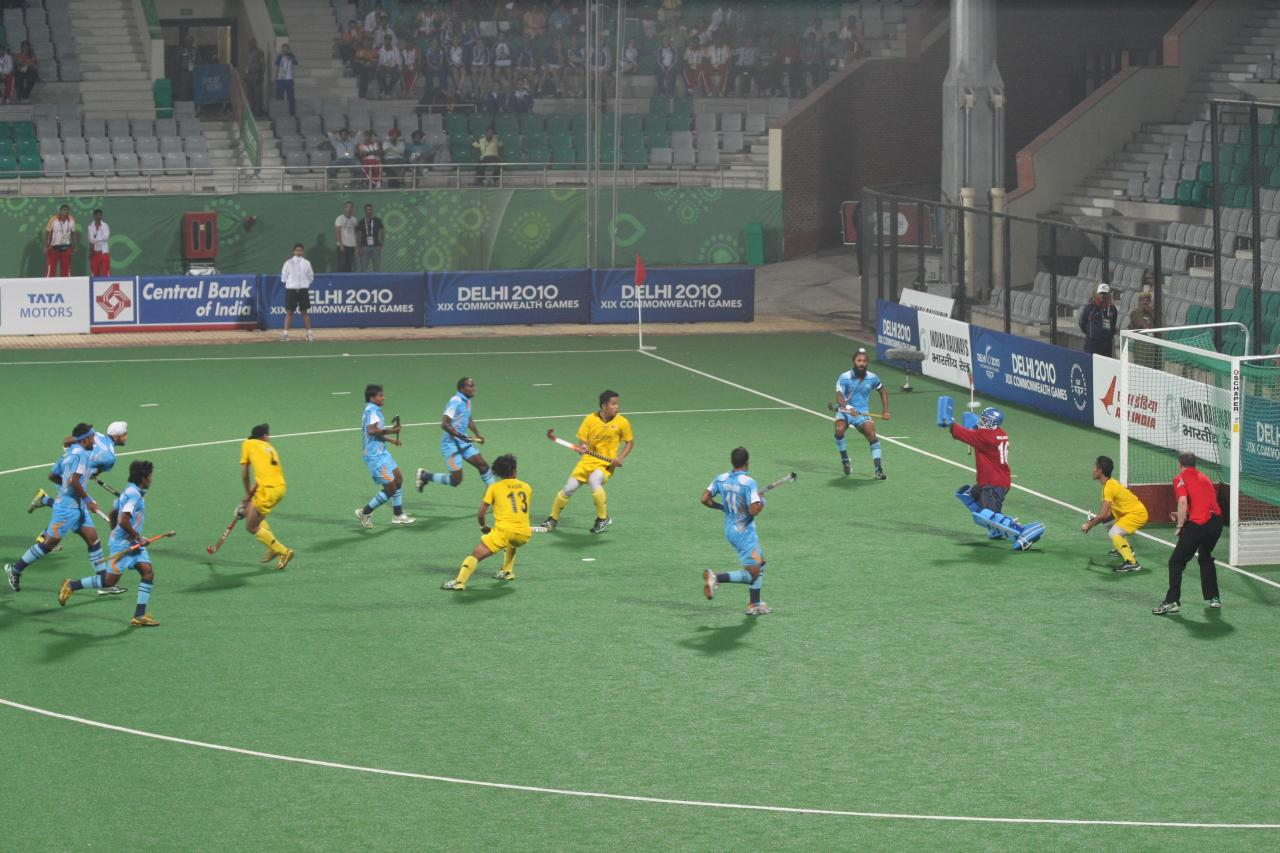
- Sandeep Singh scores India's second equaliser against Malaysia at the 2010 Commonwealth Games.
- Location: Worldwide
- Teams: India; Malaysia
- Latest meeting: Malaysia 2–4 India (2026 Men's Asian Champions Trophy, 1 November 2026)

Statistics
- Total meetings: 129
- Most wins: India (91)

India and Malaysia have played 129 hockey matches out of which 91 have been won by India and 17 have been won by Malaysia. The remaining 21 matches are draws.

== Statistics ==
Tournament	Matches	Results			Goals	
Tournament	Matches	India	Malaysia	Draw	India	Malaysia
Olympics	4	4	0	0	11	2
World Cup	4	3	1	0	14	9
Hockey World League	2	1	1	0	5	5
Asian Games	13	11	1	1	43	12
Asia Cup	10	8	0	2	30	12
Asian Champions Trophy	9	6	1	2	32	17
Afro-Asian Games	1	0	0	1	1	1
Commonwealth Games	4	2	1	1	6	5
India–Malaysia Test Series	32	22	1	9	97	35
Sultan Azlan Shah Cup	26	17	6	3	71	45
Olympic Qualifier	3	1	1	1	7	6
Champions Challenge	2	1	1	0	6	6
Invitation Tournament in India	6	5	0	1	17	4
Invitation Tournament in Australia	7	5	2	0	21	10
Invitation Tournament (Rest of World)	6	5	1	0	20	5
Grand Total	129	91	17	21	381	174

== Major Tournament matches ==
The following table show India vs Malaysia in major tournaments and their finishing in the tournament:

Note: Tournaments highlighted in red are defunct and are no longer held.

Tournament	Year	Venue	Final Position		Results (India-Malaysia Match)		
Tournament	Year	Venue	India	Malaysia	India	Malaysia	Note
Olympics	1964	(Japan) Tokyo	Gold	9	3	1	India Win
Olympics	1976	(Canada) Montreal	7	8	3	0	India Win
Olympics	1976	(Canada) Montreal	7	8	2	0	India Win
Olympics	1984	(United States) Los Angeles	5	11	3	1	India Win
Olympic Qualifier	1991	(New Zealand) Auckland	Silver	4	2	3	Malaysia Win
Olympic Qualifier	1996	(Spain) Barcelona	Silver	5	0	0	Draw
Olympic Qualifier	2004	(Spain) Madrid	4	10	5	3	India Win
Hockey World Cup	1975	(Malaysia) Kuala Lumpur	1	4	3	2	India Win in Over time
Hockey World Cup	1982	(India) Bombay	5	10	6	2	India Win
Hockey World Cup	2002	(Malaysia) Kuala Lumpur	10	8	2	3	Malaysia Win
Hockey World Cup	2014	(Netherlands) The Hague	9	12	3	2	India Win
Asian Games	1958	(India) New Delhi	Silver	4	6	0	India Win
Asian Games	1962	(Indonesia) Jakarta	Silver	Bronze	3	0	India Win
Asian Games	1966	(Thailand) Bangkok	Gold	4	1	0	India Win
Asian Games	1970	(Thailand) Bangkok	Silver	4	2	0	India Win
Asian Games	1974	(Iran) Tehran	Silver	Bronze	2	0	India Win
Asian Games	1978	(Thailand) Bangkok	Silver	Bronze	5	3	India Win
Asian Games	1982	(India) New Delhi	Gold	Bronze	5	1	India Win
Asian Games	1986	(South Korea) Seoul	Bronze	4	4	1	India Win
Asian Games	1990	(China) Beijing	Silver	Bronze	1	0	India Win
Asian Games	2006	(Qatar) Doha	5	6	4	0	India Win
Asian Games	2010	(China) Guangzhou	Bronze	Silver	3	4	Malaysia Win in Over time
Asian Games	2018	(Indonesia) Jakarta Palembang	Bronze	Silver	2	2	Malaysia won on penalty shootout
Asian Games	2026	(Japan) Aichi–Nagoya	Gold	Silver	5	1	India Win
Hockey Asia Cup	1982	(Pakistan) Karachi	Silver	4	2	0	India Win
Hockey Asia Cup	1985	(Bangladesh) Dhaka	Silver	5	3	2	India Win
Hockey Asia Cup	1994	(Japan) Hiroshima	Silver	4	3	2	India Win
Hockey Asia Cup	1999	(Malaysia) Kuala Lumpur	Bronze	4	1	1	Draw
Hockey Asia Cup	1999	(Malaysia) Kuala Lumpur	Bronze	4	4	2	India Win
Hockey Asia Cup	2013	(Malaysia) Ipoh	Silver	4	2	0	India Win
Hockey Asia Cup	2017	(Bangladesh) Dhaka	Gold	Silver	6	2	India Win
Hockey Asia Cup	2017	(Bangladesh) Dhaka	Gold	Silver	2	1	India Win
Hockey Asia Cup	2022	(Indonesia) Jakarta	Bronze	Silver	3	3	Draw
Hockey Asia Cup	2025	(India) Rajgir	Gold	Bronze	4	1	India Win
Asian Champions Trophy	2011	(China) Ordos	Gold	Bronze	2	2	Draw
Asian Champions Trophy	2012	(Qatar) Doha	Silver	Bronze	3	5	Malaysia Win
Asian Champions Trophy	2013	(Japan) Kakamigahara	5	Bronze	4	3	India Win
Asian Champions Trophy	2016	(Malaysia) Kuantan	Gold	Bronze	2	1	India Win
Asian Champions Trophy	2018	(Oman) Muscat	Joint Winners with Pakistan	Bronze	0	0	Draw
Asian Champions Trophy	2023	(India) Chennai	Gold	Silver	5	0	India Win
Asian Champions Trophy	2023	(India) Chennai	Gold	Silver	4	3	India Win
Asian Champions Trophy	2024	(China) Hulunbuir	Gold	6	8	1	India Win
Asian Champions Trophy	2026	(India) Jalandhar	TBD		4	2	India Win
Commonwealth Games	1998	(Malaysia) Kuala Lumpur	4	Silver	0	1	Malaysia Win in Over time
Commonwealth Games	2006	(Australia) Melbourne	6	Bronze	1	1	Draw
Commonwealth Games	2010	(India) New Delhi	Silver	8	3	2	India Win
Commonwealth Games	2018	(Australia) Gold Coast	4	5	2	1	India Win
Sultan Azlan Shah Cup	1983	(Malaysia) Ipoh	Bronze	4	2	3	Malaysia Win
Sultan Azlan Shah Cup	1985	(Malaysia) Ipoh	Gold	Silver	4	2	India Win
Sultan Azlan Shah Cup	1991	(Malaysia) Ipoh	Gold	5	4	1	India Win
Sultan Azlan Shah Cup	1995	(Malaysia) Kuala Lumpur	Gold	6	1	0	India Win
Sultan Azlan Shah Cup	1996	(Malaysia) Ipoh	5	Bronze			India Win
Sultan Azlan Shah Cup	2000	(Malaysia) Kuala Lumpur	Bronze	4	2	1	India Win
Sultan Azlan Shah Cup	2000	(Malaysia) Kuala Lumpur	Bronze	4	4	1	India Win
Sultan Azlan Shah Cup	2001	(Malaysia) Kuala Lumpur	5	7	2	2	Draw
Sultan Azlan Shah Cup	2004	(Malaysia) Kuala Lumpur	7	6	2	2	Draw
Sultan Azlan Shah Cup	2005	(Malaysia) Kuala Lumpur	5	6	1	4	Malaysia Win
Sultan Azlan Shah Cup	2005	(Malaysia) Kuala Lumpur	5	6	2	1	India Win in Over time
Sultan Azlan Shah Cup	2006	(Malaysia) Kuala Lumpur	Bronze	8	5	2	India Win
Sultan Azlan Shah Cup	2007	(Malaysia) Ipoh	Bronze	Silver	1	2	Malaysia Win
Sultan Azlan Shah Cup	2008	(Malaysia) Ipoh	Silver	7	2	1	India Win
Sultan Azlan Shah Cup	2009	(Malaysia) Ipoh	Gold	Silver	3	0	India Win
Sultan Azlan Shah Cup	2009	(Malaysia) Ipoh	Gold	Silver	3	1	India Win
Sultan Azlan Shah Cup	2010	(Malaysia) Ipoh	Joint Winners with South Korea	4	2	5	Malaysia Win
Sultan Azlan Shah Cup	2011	(Malaysia) Ipoh	5	7	5	2	India Win
Sultan Azlan Shah Cup	2012	(Malaysia) Ipoh	Bronze	6	3	2	India Win
Sultan Azlan Shah Cup	2013	(Malaysia) Ipoh	6	Silver	2	2	Draw
Sultan Azlan Shah Cup	2015	(Malaysia) Ipoh	Bronze	6	2	3	Malaysia Win
Sultan Azlan Shah Cup	2016	(Malaysia) Ipoh	Silver	4	6	1	India Win
Sultan Azlan Shah Cup	2017	(Malaysia) Ipoh	Bronze	5	0	1	Malaysia Win
Sultan Azlan Shah Cup	2018	(Malaysia) Ipoh	5	4	5	1	India Win
Sultan Azlan Shah Cup	2019	(Malaysia) Ipoh	Silver	Bronze	4	2	India Win
Sultan Azlan Shah Cup	2025	(Malaysia) Ipoh	Silver	4	4	3	India Win
Hockey World League	2015	(Belgium) Antwerp	4	6	3	2	India Win
Hockey World League	2017	(England) London	6	4	2	3	Malaysia Win

== See also ==
- Indian field hockey team in Malaya and Singapore
- India–Pakistan field hockey rivalry
