= India–Pakistan field hockey rivalry =

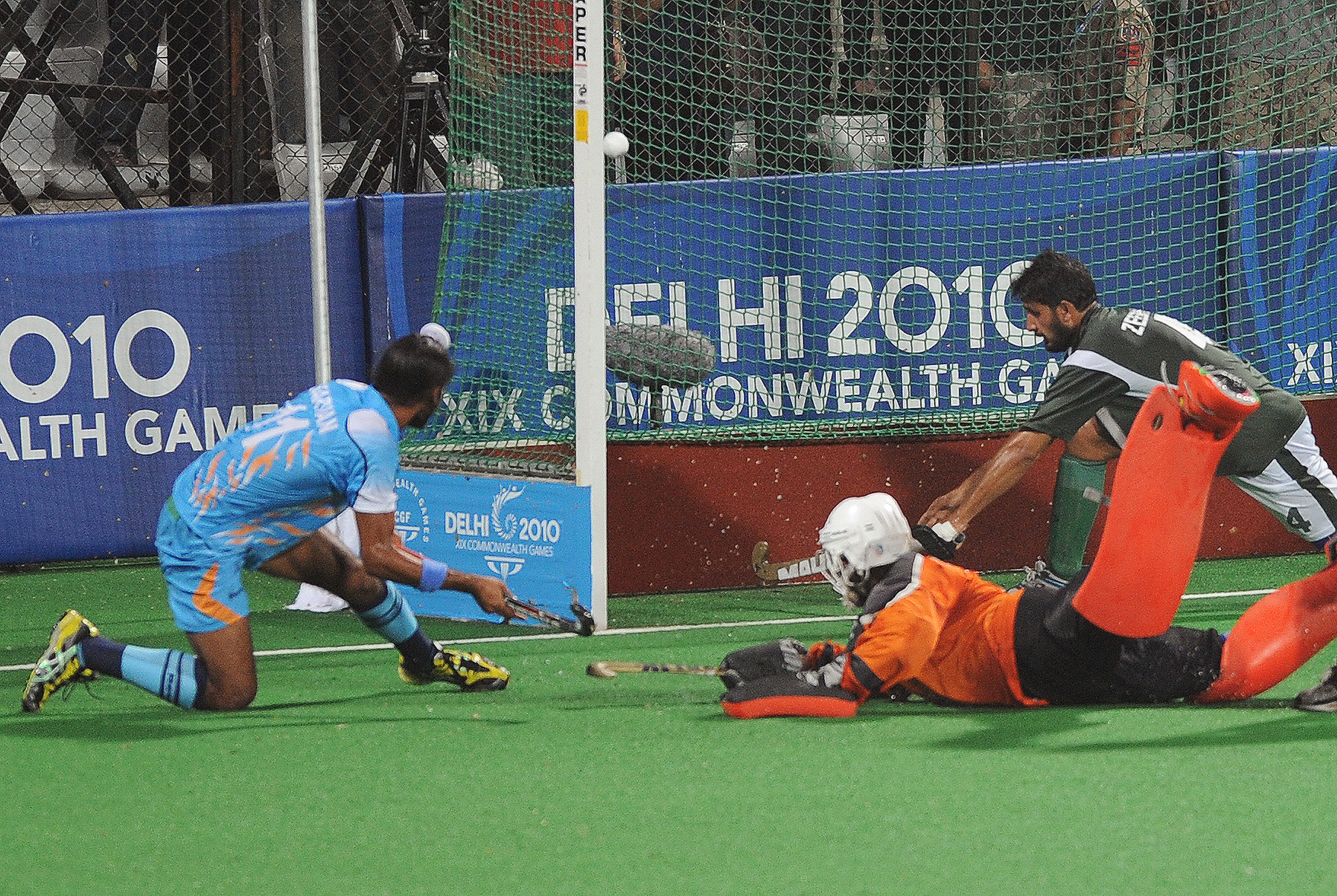
- 2010 Commonwealth Games hockey match played between India and Pakistan in Delhi
- Location: Worldwide
- Teams: India; Pakistan
- First meeting: India 1–0 Pakistan (1956 Olympics, 6 December 1956)
- Latest meeting: India 4–3 Pakistan (2026 Asian Games, 1 October 2026)
- Next meeting: TBD

Statistics
- Total meetings: 185
- Most wins: Pakistan (82); India (71)
- Largest victory: India 10–2 Pakistan (2022 Asian Games, 30 September 2023)

The India–Pakistan field hockey rivalry is among the most intense sporting rivalries in Asia and among the fiercest in field hockey. India and Pakistan have played each other numerous times in international senior hockey since their first meeting in 1956. They participate in various tournaments, namely the Summer Olympic Games, Hockey World Cup, FIH Pro League, Commonwealth Games, Asia Cup, Men's Asian Champions Trophy, Asian Games, South Asian Games and Sultan Azlan Shah Cup.

India and Pakistan have met in seven Asian Games finals, including six consecutive times from 1962 to 1982. Pakistan has won five of those finals, while India has won two. The two teams also played each other in three successive Olympic hockey finals from 1956 to 1964, with India winning the 1956 and 1964 finals and Pakistan winning the 1960 final. They have also faced each other in three Asia Cup finals, with Pakistan winning two of them. The only Hockey World Cup final between India and Pakistan was played in 1975 and it ended in a 2–1 win for India.

Across all head-to-head meetings, Pakistan has won 82 games, while India has won 71. In Olympic field hockey, India has won eight gold medals compared with Pakistan's three. Pakistan has also won four Hockey World Cup titles, while India has won one. Since 2016, India has been unbeaten against Pakistan.

Among the top three goal-scorers in this bilateral rivalry, Sohail Abbas of Pakistan leads by a significant margin, scoring 54 goals. He is followed by India's Harmanpreet Singh (23 goals), Pakistan's Hassan Sardar (22 goals) and India's Sandeep Singh (21 goals).

== Statistics ==
By Year

Decade wise record of India vs Pakistan field hockey:

Year	Matches	Results			Goals	
Year	Matches	India	Pakistan	Draw	India	Pakistan
1950s	2	1	0	1	1	0
1960s	6	2	3	1	3	5
1970s	13	3	9	1	10	27
1980s	46	14	22	10	79	111
1990s	26	9	13	4	52	62
2000s	47	14	27	6	108	128
2010s	35	19	8	8	102	62
2020s	10	9	0	1	44	18
Total	185	71	82	32	399	413

By Tournament

The record between India and Pakistan by tournament is:

Tournament	Matches	Results			Goals	
Tournament	Matches	India	Pakistan	Draw	India	Pakistan
Test series	52	16	25	11	104	124
Summer Olympics	7	2	4	1	3	8
World Cup	6	4	2	0	15	10
FIH Pro League	2	2	0	0	11	4
Champions Trophy	19	7	12	0	48	54
Asian Games	17	6	8	3	31	34
Asia Cup	9	3	5	1	18	20
Asian Champions Trophy	12	8	2	2	34	23
Commonwealth Games	3	1	1	1	10	10
FIH Hockey World League	3	2	0	1	15	4
Afro-Asian Games	2	2	0	0	7	3
Other Matches (Continent wise)
Africa	2	1	0	1	5	2
Americas	2	0	1	1	5	8
Asia	34	14	14	6	79	69
Europe	10	1	8	1	16	33
Oceania	5	2	0	3	12	9
Total	185	71	82	32	399	413

== Major tournaments won ==
- indicates that the team has more titles in that competition than its rival.

Tournament	India	Pakistan
Summer Olympics	8 (1928, 1932, 1936, 1948, 1952, 1956, 1964, 1980)	3 (1960, 1968, 1984)
World Cup	1 (1975)	4 (1971, 1978, 1982, 1994)
Champions Trophy	—	3 (1978, 1980, 1994)
Hockey Series	1 (2018–19)	—
Champions Challenge	1 (2001)	—
Asian Games	5 (1966, 1998, 2014, 2022, 2026)	8 (1958, 1962, 1970, 1974, 1978, 1982, 1990, 2010)
Asia Cup	4 (2003, 2007, 2017, 2025)	3 (1982, 1985, 1989)
Asian Champions Trophy	6 (2011, 2016, 2018, 2023, 2024, 2026)	3 (2012, 2013, 2018)
Afro-Asian Games	1 (2003)	—
South Asian Games	1 (1995)	3 (2006, 2010, 2016)
Sultan Azlan Shah Cup	5 (1985, 1991, 1995, 2009, 2010)	3 (1999, 2000, 2003)
Total	33	30

== Records ==
=== Top goal-scorers ===
Pakistan

Rank	Player	Goals	Years
1	(Pakistan) Sohail Abbas	54	1998–2012
2	(Pakistan) Hassan Sardar	22	1979–1987
3	(Pakistan) Rehan Butt	19	2002–2012
4	(Pakistan) Hanif Khan	13	1976–1985
4	(Pakistan) Kaleemullah	13	1979–1986

India

Rank	Player	Goals	Years
1	(India) Harmanpreet Singh	23	2015–
2	(India) Sandeep Singh	21	2004–2012
3	(India) Gagan Ajit Singh	18	1997–2007
4	(India) Mohinder Pal Singh	15	1976–1988
4	(India) Baljit Singh Dhillon	15	1993–2004
6	(India) Dhanraj Pillay	11	1989–2004

== Test series ==
India and Pakistan have played eight Test series, all between 1978 and 2006. Pakistan has won six series, while India has won one, and one series ended in a draw. Across all series, 52 matches have been played, with Pakistan winning 25, India winning 16, and 11 matches ending in a draw. The goals aggregate is 124–104 in Pakistan's favour. Reports of Test series being revived emerged in 2013 and 2017, but have not materialized since then.

Overall results:
Year	Matches	Winner	Results	Pakistan		India	
Year	Matches	Winner	Results	Captain	Coach	Captain	Coach
1978	4	Pakistan win	3–1	Islahuddin Siddique	(Pakistan) Sayad A. Hussain	Victor Philips	(India) Randhir Singh Gentle
1981	4	Pakistan win	2–1	Akhtar Rasool	(Pakistan) Khwaja Zakauddin	Surjit Singh Randhawa	(India) Harmik Singh
1986	7	India win	3–2	Hassan Sardar	(Pakistan) Anwar Ahmad Khan	Mohammed Shahid	(India) M. P. Ganesh
1988	6	Draw	2–2	Nasir Ali	(Pakistan) Manzoor-ul Hassan	M. M. Somaya	(India) M. P. Ganesh
1998	8	Pakistan win	4–3	Tahir Zaman	(Pakistan) Islahuddin Siddique	Dhanraj Pillay	(India) Vasudevan Baskaran
1999	9	Pakistan win	5–3	Atif Bashir	(Pakistan) Shehnaz Sheikh	Anil Aldrin	(India) Vasudevan Baskaran
2004	8	Pakistan win	4–2	Waseem Ahmed	(Netherlands) Roelant Oltmans	Dilip Tirkey	(Germany) Gerhard Rach
2006	6	Pakistan win	3–1	Muhammad Saqlain	(Pakistan) Asif Bajwa	Ignace Tirkey	(India) Rajinder Singh Jr.

== Results in major tournaments ==
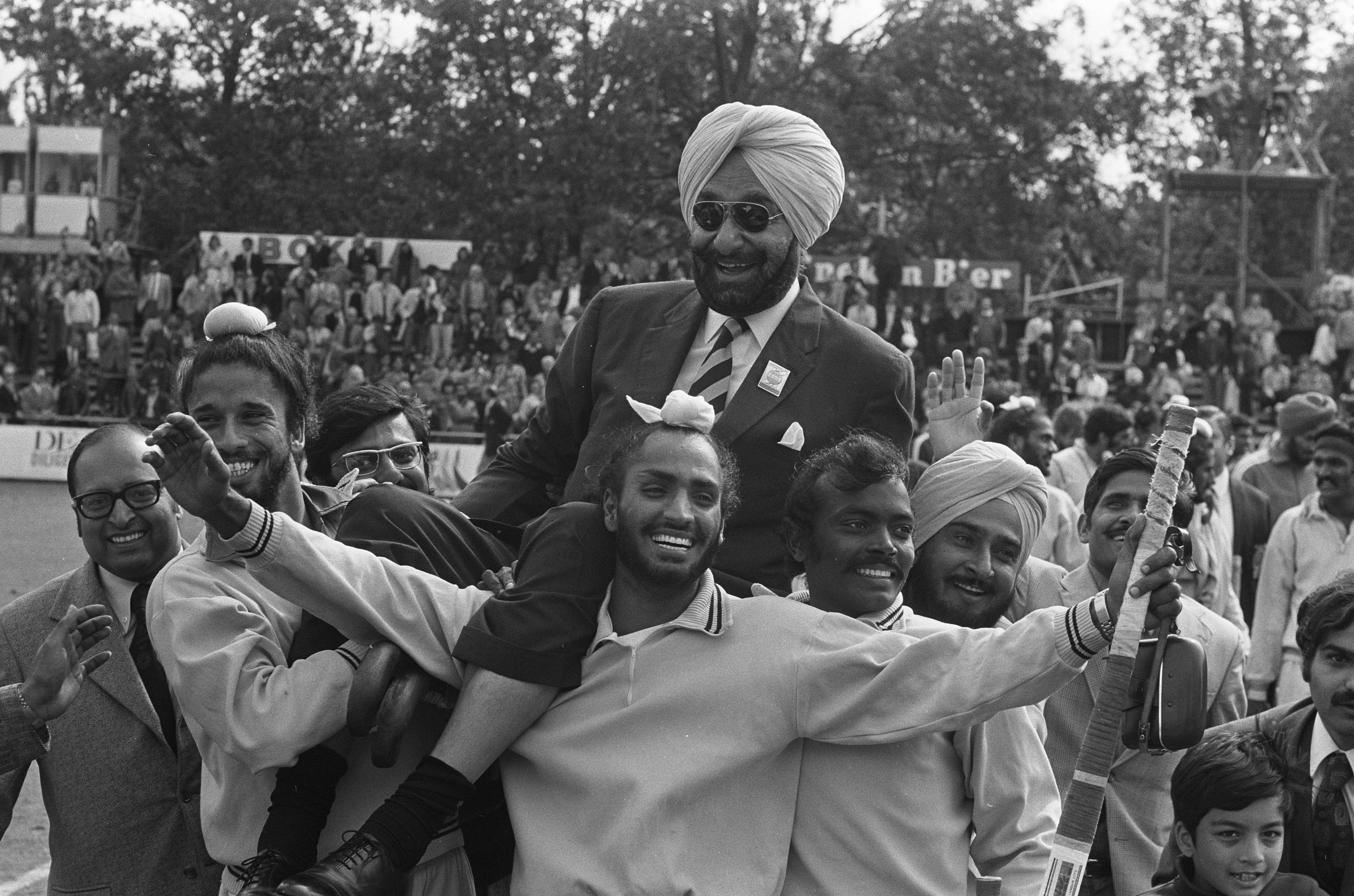
The Indian ambassador celebrates India's 1–0 victory over Pakistan in the semi-final of the 1973 Men's Hockey World Cup.

The following table shows India vs Pakistan in major tournaments :

Note: Tournaments highlighted in red are defunct and are no longer held.

Tournament	Year	Venue	Winning team, result
Olympic Games	1956	(Australia) Melbourne	India, 1–0
Olympic Games	1960	(Italy) Rome	Pakistan, 1–0
Olympic Games	1964	(Japan) Tokyo	India, 1–0
Olympic Games	1972	(Germany) Munich	Pakistan, 2–0
Olympic Games	1988	(South Korea) Seoul	Pakistan, 2–1
Olympic Games	1996	(United States) Atlanta	Draw, 0–0
Olympic Games	2004	(Greece) Athens	Pakistan, 3–0
Olympic Qualifier	2004	(Spain) Madrid	Pakistan, 5–3
Olympic Qualifier	2004	(Spain) Madrid	Pakistan, 4–2
World Cup	1971	(Spain) Barcelona	Pakistan, 2–1
World Cup	1973	(Netherlands) Amsterdam	India, 1–0
World Cup	1975	(Malaysia) Kuala Lumpur	India, 2–1
World Cup	1986	(England) London	Pakistan, 3–2
World Cup	2010	(India) New Delhi	India, 4–1
World Cup	2026	(Netherlands) Amstelveen	India, 5–3
FIH Pro League	2025–26	(England) London	India, 4–3
FIH Pro League	2025–26	(England) London	India, 7–1
Asian Games	1958	(Japan) Tokyo	Draw, 0–0
Asian Games	1962	(Indonesia) Jakarta	Pakistan, 2–0
Asian Games	1966	(Thailand) Bangkok	India, 1–0
Asian Games	1970	(Thailand) Bangkok	Pakistan, 1–0
Asian Games	1974	(Iran) Tehran	Draw, 1–1
Asian Games	1974	(Iran) Tehran	Pakistan, 2–0
Asian Games	1978	(Thailand) Bangkok	Pakistan, 1–0
Asian Games	1982	(India) New Delhi	Pakistan, 7–1
Asian Games	1986	(South Korea) Seoul	Pakistan, 3–1
Asian Games	1990	(China) Beijing	Pakistan, 3–2
Asian Games	2002	(South Korea) Busan	India, 4–3
Asian Games	2010	(China) Guangzhou	India, 3–2
Asian Games	2014	(South Korea) Incheon	Pakistan, 2–1
Asian Games	2014	(South Korea) Incheon	Draw, 1–1 (4–2 p.s.o India)
Asian Games	2018	(Indonesia) Jakarta	India, 2–1
Asian Games	2022 (Note: Held in September – October 2023)	(China) Hangzhou	India, 10–2
Asian Games	2026	(Japan) Aichi-Nagoya	India, 4–3
Asia Cup	1982	(Pakistan) Karachi	Pakistan, 4–0
Asia Cup	1985	(Bangladesh) Dhaka	Pakistan, 3–2
Asia Cup	1989	(India) New Delhi	Pakistan, 2–0
Asia Cup	2003	(Malaysia) Kuala Lumpur	Pakistan, 4–2
Asia Cup	2003	(Malaysia) Kuala Lumpur	India, 4–2
Asia Cup	2009	(Malaysia) Kuantan	Pakistan, 3–2
Asia Cup	2017	(Bangladesh) Dhaka	India, 3–1
Asia Cup	2017	(Bangladesh) Dhaka	India, 4–0
Asia Cup	2022	(Indonesia) Jakarta	Draw, 1–1
Asian Champions Trophy	2011	(China) Ordos	Draw, 2–2
Asian Champions Trophy	2011	(China) Ordos	Draw, 0–0 (4–2 p.s.o India)
Asian Champions Trophy	2012	(Qatar) Doha	India, 2–1
Asian Champions Trophy	2012	(Qatar) Doha	Pakistan, 5–4
Asian Champions Trophy	2013	(Japan) Kakamigahara	Pakistan, 5–4
Asian Champions Trophy	2016	(Malaysia) Kuantan	India, 3–2
Asian Champions Trophy	2016	(Malaysia) Kuantan	India, 3–2
Asian Champions Trophy	2018	(Oman) Muscat	India, 3–1
Asian Champions Trophy	2021	(Bangladesh) Dhaka	India, 3–1
Asian Champions Trophy	2021	(Bangladesh) Dhaka	India, 4–3
Asian Champions Trophy	2023	(India) Chennai	India, 4–0
Asian Champions Trophy	2024	(China) Hulunbuir	India, 2–1
Commonwealth Games	2006	(Australia) Melbourne	Pakistan, 4–1
Commonwealth Games	2010	(India) New Delhi	India, 7–4
Commonwealth Games	2018	(Australia) Gold Coast	Draw, 2–2
South Asian Games	1995	(India) Madras	India, 5–2
South Asian Games	2006	(Sri Lanka) Colombo	India, 2–0
South Asian Games	2006	(Sri Lanka) Colombo	Pakistan, 3–2
South Asian Games	2010	(Bangladesh) Dhaka	India, 5–1
South Asian Games	2010	(Bangladesh) Dhaka	Draw, 1–1 (4–3 p.s.o Pakistan)
South Asian Games	2016	(India) Guwahati	Pakistan, 2–1
South Asian Games	2016	(India) Guwahati	Pakistan, 1–0
Sultan Azlan Shah Cup	1983	(Malaysia) Kuala Lumpur	Draw, 1–1
Sultan Azlan Shah Cup	1985	(Malaysia) Ipoh	India, 1–0
Sultan Azlan Shah Cup	1991	(Malaysia) Ipoh	India, 1–0
Sultan Azlan Shah Cup	2000	(Malaysia) Kuala Lumpur	Pakistan, 2–1
Sultan Azlan Shah Cup	2001	(Malaysia) Kuala Lumpur	Pakistan, 4–3
Sultan Azlan Shah Cup	2004	(Malaysia) Kuala Lumpur	Pakistan, 3–2
Sultan Azlan Shah Cup	2005	(Malaysia) Ipoh	Pakistan, 3–2
Sultan Azlan Shah Cup	2008	(Malaysia) Ipoh	India, 2–1
Sultan Azlan Shah Cup	2009	(Malaysia) Ipoh	India, 2–1
Sultan Azlan Shah Cup	2010	(Malaysia) Ipoh	India, 4–2
Sultan Azlan Shah Cup	2011	(Malaysia) Ipoh	Pakistan, 3–1
Sultan Azlan Shah Cup	2012	(Malaysia) Ipoh	India, 2–1
Sultan Azlan Shah Cup	2013	(Malaysia) Ipoh	India, 3–1
Sultan Azlan Shah Cup	2013	(Malaysia) Ipoh	India, 4–2
Sultan Azlan Shah Cup	2016	(Malaysia) Ipoh	India, 5–1
Champions Trophy	1980	(Pakistan) Karachi	Pakistan, 7–1
Champions Trophy	1982	(Netherlands) Amstelveen	India, 5–4
Champions Trophy	1983	(Pakistan) Karachi	Pakistan, 2–0
Champions Trophy	1985	(Australia) Perth	India, 2–1
Champions Trophy	1986	(Pakistan) Karachi	India, 3–2
Champions Trophy	1989	(Germany) West Berlin	Pakistan, 1–0
Champions Trophy	1995	(Germany) Berlin	Pakistan, 2–1
Champions Trophy	1996	(India) Madras	Pakistan, 3–2
Champions Trophy	2002	(Germany) Cologne	India, 3–2
Champions Trophy	2002	(Germany) Cologne	Pakistan, 4–3
Champions Trophy	2003	(Netherlands) Amstelveen	India, 7–4
Champions Trophy	2003	(Netherlands) Amstelveen	Pakistan, 4–3
Champions Trophy	2004	(Pakistan) Lahore	Pakistan, 2–1
Champions Trophy	2004	(Pakistan) Lahore	Pakistan, 3–2
Champions Trophy	2005	(India) Chennai	India, 3–2
Champions Trophy	2005	(India) Chennai	Pakistan, 4–3
Champions Trophy	2012	(Australia) Melbourne	Pakistan, 3–2
Champions Trophy	2014	(India) Bhubaneswar	Pakistan, 4–3
Champions Trophy	2018	(Netherlands) Breda	India, 4–0
FIH Hockey World League	2014–15	(Belgium) Antwerp	Draw, 2–2
FIH Hockey World League	2016–17	(United Kingdom) London	India, 7–1
FIH Hockey World League	2016–17	(United Kingdom) London	India, 6–1
Afro-Asian Games	2003	(India) Hyderabad	India, 4–2
Afro-Asian Games	2003	(India) Hyderabad	India, 3–1
Champions Challenge I	2009	(Argentina) Salta	Pakistan, 6–3

== Other matches ==
Other matches played between India and Pakistan are:

Tournament	Year	Venue	Results		
Tournament	Year	Venue	India	Pakistan	Note
Hockey Festival	1966	(Germany) Hamburg	1	1	Draw
Pre-Olympic Invitation Tournament	1967	(United Kingdom) London	0	1	Pakistan win
Jinnah Memorial Cup	1976	(Pakistan) Lahore	0	5	Pakistan win
Pentangular Cup	1980	(Malaysia) Kuala Lumpur	1	3	Pakistan win
Test Matches	1982	(United Arab Emirates) Dubai	1	5	Pakistan win
Test Matches	1982	(United Arab Emirates) Dubai	1	3	Pakistan win
Esanda Cup	1982	(Australia) Melbourne	2	1	India win
Golden Jubilee Cup	1983	Hong Kong	1	5	Pakistan win
Test Matches	1985	Kuwait City	1	0	India win
Test Matches	1985	Kuwait City	1	0	India win
Test Matches	1985	(Qatar) Doha	1	1	Draw
Emirates Cup	1986	(United Arab Emirates) Dubai	2	2	Draw
Emirates Cup	1986	Kuwait City	3	3	Draw
4 Nations Cups	1986	(Soviet Union) Leningrad	0	2	Pakistan win
Marshall Invitation Cup	1988	(Kenya) Nairobi	3	0	India win
Marshall Invitation Cup	1988	(Kenya) Nairobi	1	1	Draw
Indira Gandhi Gold Cup	1989	(India) Lucknow	0	3	Pakistan win
Atlanta Challenge Cup	1996	(United States) Atlanta	2	2	Draw
Prime Ministers Cup	2001	(Bangladesh) Dhaka	3	3	Draw ( India win p.s.o 6–5)
4 nations tournament	2003	(Australia) Perth	2	0	India win
4 nations tournament	2003	(Australia) Sydney	4	4	Draw
RaboTrophy	2004	(Netherlands) Amsterdam	1	6	Pakistan win
RaboTrophy	2004	(Netherlands) Amsterdam	3	5	Pakistan win
RaboTrophy	2005	(Netherlands) Amsterdam	1	3	Pakistan win
3 nations tournament	2011	(Australia) Busselton	3	3	Draw
3 nations tournament	2011	(Australia) Bunbury	1	1	Draw
Friendly	2011	India	2	3	Pakistan win
Lanco International Super Series	2012	(Australia) Perth	5	2	India win

== Players who have played for both teams ==
Prior to the Partition of India in 1947 India had played field hockey, having first played as an international side in 1926. Following the Partition, Pakistan was created and began playing as an independent nation, making their debut at the 1948 Summer Olympics.

The following players played for Pakistan after appearing for India. They are:

- Ali Dara – Represented India at 1936 Olympics; and for Pakistan at 1948 Olympics
- Peter Paul Fernandes – Represented India at 1936 Olympics; and for Pakistan after 1948
- Latif-ur Rehman – Represented India at 1948 Olympics; and for Pakistan at 1952 and 1956 Olympics
- Akhtar Hussain – Represented India at 1948 Olympics; and for Pakistan at 1956 Olympics

== See also ==
- India–Malaysia field hockey rivalry
- Netherlands–Pakistan field hockey record
- India–Pakistan relations
- India–Pakistan sports rivalries
- India–Pakistan cricket rivalry
