= 2025 Sultan Azlan Shah Cup =

Malaysian men's field hockey tournament

Tournament details
- Host country: Malaysia
- City: Ipoh
- Dates: 23–30 November
- Teams: 6 (from 4 confederations)
- Venue: Azlan Shah Stadium

Final positions
- Champions: Belgium (1st title)
- Runner-up: India
- Third place: New Zealand

Tournament statistics
- Matches played: 18
- Goals scored: 107 (5.94 per match)
- Top scorer: (New Zealand) Sam Lane (9 goals)

The 2025 Sultan Azlan Shah Cup was the 31st edition of the Sultan Azlan Shah Cup, the annual men's invitational international field hockey tournament hosted by Malaysia. It was held at the Azlan Shah Stadium in Ipoh, Malaysia from 23 to 30 November 2025.

The defending champions, Japan, did not receive an invitation to participate in the tournament. Belgium won their first Sultan Azlan Shah Cup title by defeating India 1–0 in the final. New Zealand won the bronze medal by defeating the hosts Malaysia 6–1.

== Teams ==
The following six teams were invited by the Malaysian Hockey Confederation to participate in the tournament.

Team	FIH Ranking	Appearance	Last appearance	Previous best performance
Belgium	3	2nd	2008	6th place (2008)
Canada	20	11th	2024	4th place (1995, 1999, 2019)
India	7	23rd	2019	Champions (1985, 1991, 1995, 2009, 2010)
South Korea	15	23rd	2022	Champions (1996, 2010, 2019)
Malaysia	13	31st	2024	Champions (2022)
New Zealand	11	17th	2024	Champions (2012, 2015)

== Preliminary round ==
=== Standings ===
Pos	Team	Pld	W	D	L	GF	GA	GD	Pts	Qualification
1	Belgium	5	4	1	0	24	7	+17	13	Final
2	India	5	4	0	1	24	11	+13	12	Final
3	New Zealand	5	2	1	2	12	13	−1	7	Third place match
4	Malaysia (H)	5	1	1	3	12	21	−9	4	Third place match
5	Canada	5	1	1	3	11	24	−13	4	Fifth place match
6	South Korea	5	1	0	4	9	16	−7	3	Fifth place match

Source: FIH
Rules for classification: 1) points; 2) matches won; 3) goal difference; 4) goals for; 5) head-to-head result; 6) field goals for.
(H) Hosts

=== Fixtures ===
23 November 2025
18:30

New Zealand	2–2	Malaysia
Lane 26'; Thomas 58'	Report	Silverius 10'; Cholan 22'

Umpires:
Haroon Rashid (PAK)
Kim Jiyong (KOR)

23 November 2025
20:30

Belgium	1–1	Canada
Stockbroekx 57'	Report	Sarmento 27'

Umpires:
Ben Grant (NZL)
Balaji Kumar (IND)

23 November 2025
22:15

India	1–0	South Korea
Raheel 15'	Report

Umpires:
Coen Van Bunge (NED)
Tyler Klenk (CAN)

24 November 2025
16:00

South Korea	1–3	New Zealand
Kim Hyeon-hong 30+'	Report	Lane 18', 49'; Lidstone 51'

Umpires:
Thipak Kanabathu (MAS)
Haroon Rashid (PAK)

24 November 2025
21:55

Malaysia	3–2	Canada
Anuar 5'; Azrai 20'; Faizal 25'	Report	Davis 13'; Sarmento 17'

Umpires:
Raghu Prasad (IND)
Lucien Vanderborght (BEL)

25 November 2025
10:00

Belgium	3–2	India
Duvekot 17', 46'; De Kerpel 45'	Report	Abhishek 33'; Shilanand 57'

Umpires:
Coen Van Bunge (NED)
Mohd Ismady Alis (MAS)

26 November 2025
16:00

Canada	2–4	New Zealand
Guraliuk 32'; McCulloch 49'	Report	Baker 16', 32'; Lane 20'; Houlbrooke 31'

Umpires:
Balaji Kumar (IND)
Lucien Vanderborght (BEL)

26 November 2025
18:00

South Korea	2–6	Belgium
Kim Hyeon-hong 30', 60'	Report	Hendrickx 11', 37'; Boon 18', 46', 49'; Stockbroekx 49'

Umpires:
Ben Grant (NZL)
Thipak Kanabathu (MAS)

26 November 2025
20:00

India	4–3	Malaysia
Selvam 7'; Sukhjeet 21'; Amit 39'; Sanjay 53'	Report	Faizal 13'; Fitri 36'; Jalil 45'

Umpires:
Tyler Klenk (CAN)
Kim Jiyong (KOR)

27 November 2025
16:00

South Korea	2–3	Canada
Park Cheoleon 31'; Yang Ji-hun 56'	Report	Davis 17'; McCulloch 53'; Sarmento 57'

Umpires:
Haroon Rashid (PAK)
Mohd Ismady Alis (MAS)

27 November 2025
18:00

India	3–2	New Zealand
Amit 4'; Sanjay 32'; Selvam 54'	Report	Baker 42', 48'

Umpires:
Coen Van Bunge (NED)
Lucien Vanderborght (BEL)

27 November 2025
20:00

Malaysia	1–9	Belgium
Faizal 13'	Report	Boon 8', 38'; Crols 11'; Stockbroekx 15'; Duvekot 24', 54'; Hendrickx 27'; Willems 30+'; Foubert 41'

Umpires:
Ben Grant (NZL)
Raghu Prasad (IND)

29 November 2025
16:00

Canada	3–14	India
Guraliuk 11'; Sarmento 35'; Sidhu 55'	Report	Sharma 4'; Rajinder 10', 24'; Jugraj 12', 26', 39', 50'; Amit 15', 46'; Dilpreet 25'; Selvam 43'; Sanjay 56'; Abhishek 57', 59'

Umpires:
Thipak Kanabathu (MAS)
Kim Jiyong (KOR)

29 November 2025
18:00

New Zealand	1–5	Belgium
Thomas 56'	Report	Van Dessel 2'; Stockbroekx 19', 26'; Foubert 25'; Boon 52'

Umpires:
Mohd Ismady Alis (MAS)
Raghu Prasad (IND)

29 November 2025
20:00

Malaysia	3–4	South Korea
Faizal 54'; Azrai 55', 58'	Report	Oh Seyong 4'; Park Cheoleon 5'; Yang Ji-hun 47'; Kim Hyeon-hong 58'

Umpires:
Tyler Klenk (CAN)
Balaji Kumar (IND)

== Classification round ==
=== Fifth and sixth place ===
30 November 2025
16:00

Canada	4–3	South Korea
Davis 15', 49'; Guraliuk 43', 53'	Report	Yang Ji-hun 18'; Kim Hyeon-hong 58', 60'

=== Third and fourth place ===
30 November 2025
18:15

New Zealand	6–1	Malaysia
Lane 5', 7', 33', 34', 41'; Hickson 29'	Report	Faizal 43'

=== Final ===
30 November 2025
20:30

Belgium	1–0	India
Stockbroekx 34'	Report

== Statistics ==
=== Final standings ===
1. Belgium
2. India
3. New Zealand
4. Malaysia
5. Canada
6. South Korea

=== Goalscorers ===
There have been 107 goals scored in 18 matches, for an average of 5.94 goals per match.

9 goals

- (New Zealand) Sam Lane

6 goals

- (Belgium) Tom Boon
- (Belgium) Thibeau Stockbroekx
- (South Korea) Kim Hyeon-hong

5 goals

- (Malaysia) Faizal Saari

4 goals

- (Belgium) Roman Duvekot
- (Canada) Sean Davis
- (Canada) Brendan Guraliuk
- (Canada) Matthew Sarmento
- (India) Amit Rohidas
- (India) Jugraj Singh
- (New Zealand) George Baker

3 goals

- (Belgium) Alexander Hendrickx
- (India) Abhishek Nain
- (India) Sanjay Rana
- (India) Karthi Selvam
- (Malaysia) Abu Kamal Azrai
- (South Korea) Yang Ji-hun

2 goals

- (Belgium) Victor Foubert
- (Canada) Flynn McCulloch
- (India) Rajinder Singh
- (New Zealand) Dylan Thomas
- (South Korea) Park Cheol-eon

1 goal

- (Belgium) Thomas Crols
- (Belgium) Nicolas De Kerpel
- (Belgium) Arno Van Dessel
- (Belgium) Tommy Willems
- (Canada) Jyothswaroop Sidhu
- (India) Shilanand Lakra
- (India) Mohammed Raheel Mouseen
- (India) Nilakanta Sharma
- (India) Dilpreet Singh
- (India) Sukhjeet Singh
- (Malaysia) Akhimullah Anuar
- (Malaysia) Syed Cholan
- (Malaysia) Marhan Jalil
- (Malaysia) Fitri Saari
- (Malaysia) Shello Silverius
- (New Zealand) James Hickson
- (New Zealand) Isaac Houlbrooke
- (New Zealand) Nicholas Lidstone
- (South Korea) Oh Se-yong

Source: FIH

== See also ==
- 2025 Sultan of Johor Cup
