= 2019 Sultan Azlan Shah Cup =

International field hockey tournament

Tournament details
- Host country: Malaysia
- City: Ipoh
- Dates: 23–30 March
- Teams: 6 (from 3 confederations)
- Venue(s): Azlan Shah Stadium

Final positions
- Champions: South Korea (3rd title)
- Runner-up: India
- Third place: Malaysia

Tournament statistics
- Matches played: 18
- Goals scored: 96 (5.33 per match)
- Top scorer(s): (India) Mandeep Singh (South Korea) Jang Jong-hyun (7 goals)
- Best player: (India) Surender Kumar

The 2019 Sultan Azlan Shah Cup was the 28th edition of the Sultan Azlan Shah Cup. It was held in Ipoh, Malaysia from 23 until 30 March.

The number of teams for this year's cup is the same as last year's tournament where six teams competed. India, Canada, Japan, Malaysia, Poland, and South Korea participated in this edition of the Sultan Azlan Shah Cup.

South Korea won the tournament for the third time after defeating India 4–2 on penalties, after the match ended in a draw at 1–1, in the final.

== Teams ==
Argentina, Australia, and England who competed in the past tournament did not participate this year due to the 2019 Men's FIH Pro League. Canada, Japan, and South Korea are the teams replacing them.

Ireland withdrew from the tournament a month before it began. Poland was invited to replace South Africa (the team planned to replace Ireland), who were not able to finance flight tickets.

Team	FIH Ranking (January 2019)	Appearance	Last Appearance	Previous best performance
Canada	10	9th	2016	4th (1995, 1999)
India	5	22nd	2018	1st (1985, 1991, 1995, 2009, 2010)
Japan	18	4th	2017	6th (1987, 2017)
Malaysia	13	28th	2018	2nd (1985, 2007, 2009, 2013, 2014)
Poland	21	1st	–	–
South Korea	17	20th	2015	1st (1996, 2010)

== Results ==
All times are local, MYT (UTC+8).

=== Pool ===
Pos	Team	Pld	W	D	L	GF	GA	GD	Pts	Qualification
1	India	5	4	1	0	24	6	+18	13	Final
2	South Korea	5	4	1	0	16	9	+7	13	Final
3	Malaysia (H)	5	3	0	2	15	12	+3	9	Third place game
4	Canada	5	2	0	3	14	17	−3	6	Third place game
5	Japan	5	1	0	4	9	12	−3	3	Fifth place game
6	Poland	5	0	0	5	3	25	−22	0	Fifth place game

Source: FIH
(H) Hosts

23 March 2019
16:05

India	2–0	Japan
Varun 24'; Simranjeet 56'	Report

Umpires:
Steve Rogers (AUS)
Iskandar Rusli (MAS)

23 March 2019
18:05

Canada	3–6	South Korea
Sarmento 45'; Froese 45+'; Boothroyd 50'	Report	Kim Jung-hoo 14'; Lee Nam-yong 19', 31', 43'; Jang Jong-hyun 20', 44'

Umpires:
Bevan Nichol (NZL)
Gurbaj Singh (IND)

23 March 2019
20:35

Malaysia	5–1	Poland
Faizal 20', 30', 45'; Fitri 28'; Ashran 36'	Report	Kasprzyk 30+'

Umpires:
Alex Miles (CAN)
You Hyo-sik (KOR)

24 March 2019
16:05

India	1–1	South Korea
Mandeep 28'	Report	Jang Jong-hyun 60'

Umpires:
Hideki Kinoshita (JPN)
Alex Miles (CAN)

24 March 2019
18:05

Canada	4–0	Poland
Bissett 35'; Noronha-Teixeira 47', 59'; Johnston 55'	Report

Umpires:
You Hyo-sik (KOR)
Steve Rogers (AUS)

24 March 2019
20:35

Japan	3–4	Malaysia
Murata 17'; Watanabe 37'; Yamasaki 54'	Report	Faizal 3', 25'; Nik Aiman 7'; Razie 53'

Umpires:
Bevan Nichol (NZL)
Lukasz Zwierzchowski (POL)

26 March 2019
16:05

Japan	1–2	Canada
Kato 11'	Report	Panesar 10'; Kirkpatrick 41'

Umpires:
Lukasz Zwierzchowski (POL)
You Hyo-sik (KOR)

26 March 2019
18:05

Poland	2–3	South Korea
Hillyer 28'; Kurowski 50'	Report	Lee Nam-yong 40'; Jung Man-jae 56', 60'

Umpires:
Gurbaj Singh (IND)
Iskandar Rusli (MAS)

26 March 2019
20:35

Malaysia	2–4	India
Razie 21'; Firhan 57'	Report	Sumit 17'; Kumar 27'; Varun 36'; Mandeep 58'

Umpires:
Steve Rogers (AUS)
Hideki Kinoshita (JPN)

27 March 2019
16:05

Poland	0–3	Japan
	Report	Yamada 20'; Fukuda 30'; Wakuri 40'

Umpires:
Iskandar Rusli (MAS)
Gurbaj Singh (IND)

27 March 2019
18:05

Canada	3–7	India
Pearson 35'; Boothroyd 50'; Wallace 57'	Report	Varun 12'; Mandeep 20', 27', 29'; Amit 39'; Vivek 55'; Nilakanta 58'

Umpires:
Steve Rogers (AUS)
Lukasz Zwierzchowski (POL)

27 March 2019
20:35

South Korea	2–1	Malaysia
Lee Nam-yong 31'; Jang Jong-hyun 35'	Report	Razie 46'

Umpires:
Bevan Nichol (NZL)
Alex Miles (CAN)

29 March 2019
16:05

India	10–0	Poland
Vivek 1'; Kumar 7'; Varun 18', 25'; Surender 19'; Simranjeet 29'; Nilakanta 36'; Mandeep 50', 51'; Amit 55'	Report

Umpires:
Hideki Kinoshita (JPN)
You Hyo-sik (KOR)

29 March 2019
18:05

South Korea	4–2	Japan
Jang Jong-hyun 20', 57'; Lee Nam-yong 28'; Chu Suk-hoon 58'	Report	Murata 19', 42'

Umpires:
Lukasz Zwierzchowski (POL)
Iskandar Rusli (MAS)

29 March 2019
20:35

Malaysia	3–2	Canada
Firhan 6'; Razie 17'; Fitri 23'	Report	Johnston 15+', 22'

Umpires:
Gurbaj Singh (IND)
Bevan Nichol (NZL)

=== Classification round ===
==== Fifth and sixth place ====
30 March 2019
15:40

Japan	6–1	Poland
Fukuda 46', 54'; Kato 49'; Wakuri 51', 57'; Hoshi 57'	Report	Gumny 31'

Umpires:
Iskandar Rusli (MAS)
Alex Miles (CAN)

==== Third and fourth place ====
30 March 2019
18:05

Malaysia	4–2	Canada
Nik Aiman 23'; Azrai 29'; Tengku 30'; Faizal 45'	Report	Pearson 14'; Wallace 59'

Umpires:
You Hyo-sik (KOR)
Lukasz Zwierzchowski (POL)

==== Final ====
30 March 2019
20:35

India	1–1	South Korea
Simranjeet 9'	Report	Jang Jong-hyun 47'
Penalties
Sumit (penalty shoot-out missed); Birendra (penalty shoot-out scored); Varun K. (penalty shoot-out scored); Sumit K. (penalty shoot-out missed)	2–4	(penalty shoot-out scored) Ji Woo-cheon; (penalty shoot-out scored) Lee Jung-jun; (penalty shoot-out missed) Kim Ki-hoon; (penalty shoot-out scored) Jung Man-jae; (penalty shoot-out scored) Lee Nam-yong

Umpires:
Steve Rogers (AUS)
Bevan Nichol (NZL)

== Statistics ==
=== Final standings ===
1. South Korea
2. India
3. Malaysia
4. Canada
5. Japan
6. Poland

=== Goalscorers ===
There have been 96 goals scored in 18 matches, for an average of 5.33 goals per match.

7 goals

- (India) Mandeep Singh
- (South Korea) Jang Jong-hyun

6 goals

- (Malaysia) Faizal Saari
- (South Korea) Lee Nam-yong

5 goals

- (India) Varun Kumar

4 goals

- (Malaysia) Razie Rahim

3 goals

- (Canada) Gordon Johnston
- (India) Simranjeet Singh
- (Japan) Kentaro Fukuda
- (Japan) Kazuma Murata
- (Japan) Hirotaka Wakuri

2 goals

- (Canada) Fin Boothroyd
- (Canada) Devohn Noronha-Teixeira
- (Canada) Mark Pearson
- (Canada) James Wallace
- (India) Amit Rohidas
- (India) Nilakanta Sharma
- (India) Sumit Kumar
- (India) Vivek Prasad
- (Japan) Ryosei Kato
- (Malaysia) Aiman Rozemi
- (Malaysia) Firhan Ashaari
- (Malaysia) Fitri Saari
- (South Korea) Jung Man-jae

1 goal

- (Canada) Brenden Bissett
- (Canada) Adam Froese
- (Canada) James Kirkpatrick
- (Canada) Balraj Panesar
- (Canada) Matthew Sarmento
- (India) Surender Kumar
- (India) Sumit
- (Japan) Suguru Hoshi
- (Japan) Kota Watanabe
- (Japan) Shota Yamada
- (Japan) Koji Yamasaki
- (Malaysia) Ashran Hamsani
- (Malaysia) Azrai Abu Kamal
- (Malaysia) Tengku Ahmad Tajuddin
- (Poland) Mikolaj Gumny
- (Poland) Joseph Hillyer
- (Poland) Michal Kasprzyk
- (Poland) Jacek Kurowski
- (South Korea) Chu Suk-hoon
- (South Korea) Kim Jung-hoo

Source: FIH

=== Awards ===
Five awards were awarded during the tournament, they were:

- Fairplay: Japan
- Best Player: (India) Surender Kumar
- Man of the Match (Final): (South Korea) Jang Jong-hyun
- Best Goalkeeper: (South Korea) Kim Jae-hyeon
- Top Scorer: (India) Mandeep Singh & (South Korea) Jang Jong-hyun (7 goals each)

== See also ==
- 2019 Sultan of Johor Cup
