= Canada men's national field hockey team =

National sports team

Canada
- Nickname(s): Red Caribou
- Association: Field Hockey Canada
- Confederation: PAHF (Americas)
- Head Coach: Peter Milkovich
- Assistant coach(es): Bartel Berkhout
- Manager: Mark Wittig
- Captain: Keegan Pereira; Balraj Panesar; John Smythe
- Most caps: Ken Pereira (348)
- Top scorer: Scott Tupper (126)
Home	Away

FIH ranking
- Current: 19 (6 November 2026)

Olympic Games
- Appearances: 8 (first in 1964)
- Best result: 10th (1976, 1984, 2000, 2008)

World Cup
- Appearances: 6 (first in 1978)
- Best result: 8th (1998)

Pan American Games
- Appearances: 15 (first in 1967)
- Best result: 1st (1983, 1987, 1999, 2007)

Pan American Cup
- Appearances: 7 (first in 2000)
- Best result: 1st (2009)
Medal record
Event	1st	2nd	3rd
Pan American Games	4	8	2
Pan American Cup	1	4	2
Total	5	12	4
Pan American Games
Gold medal – first place	1983 Caracas	Team
Gold medal – first place	1987 Indianapolis	Team
Gold medal – first place	1999 Winnipeg	Team
Gold medal – first place	2007 Rio de Janeiro	Team
Silver medal – second place	1975 Mexico City	Team
Silver medal – second place	1979 San Juan	Team
Silver medal – second place	1991 Havana	Team
Silver medal – second place	1995 Mar del Plata	Team
Silver medal – second place	2003 Santo Domingo	Team
Silver medal – second place	2011 Guadalajara	Team
Silver medal – second place	2015 Toronto	Team
Silver medal – second place	2019 Lima	Team
Bronze medal – third place	1971 Cali	Team
Bronze medal – third place	2023 Santiago	Team
Pan American Cup
Gold medal – first place	2009 Santiago	
Silver medal – second place	2000 Havana	
Silver medal – second place	2004 London	
Silver medal – second place	2013 Brampton	
Silver medal – second place	2017 Lancaster	
Bronze medal – third place	2022 Santiago	
Bronze medal – third place	2025 Montevideo	

The Canadian men's national field hockey team represents Canada in international men's field hockey since 1964, when it played in the 1964 Summer Olympics in Tokyo, Japan.

== Tournament history ==
=== Summer Olympics ===
Summer Olympics record
Year	Host	Position	Pld	W	D	L	GF	GA	Squad
1908 to 1960		did not participate							
1964	Tokyo, Japan	13th	7	1	0	6	5	25	Squad
1968	Mexico City, Mexico	did not participate							
1972	(West Germany) Munich, Germany	did not participate							
1976	Montreal, Canada	10th	6	1	0	5	6	14	Squad
1980	Moscow, Soviet Union	did not participate							
1984	Los Angeles, United States	10th	7	1	1	5	8	20	Squad
1988	Seoul, South Korea	11th	7	1	2	4	6	15	Squad
1992	Barcelona, Spain	did not qualify							
1996	Atlanta, United States	did not qualify							
2000	Sydney, Australia	10th	7	1	3	3	10	16	Squad
2004	Athens, Greece	did not qualify							
2008	Beijing, China	10th	6	1	1	4	10	20	Squad
2012	(United Kingdom) London, Great Britain	did not qualify							
2016	Rio de Janeiro, Brazil	11th	5	0	1	4	7	22	Squad
2020	Tokyo, Japan	12th	5	0	1	4	9	27	Squad
2024	Paris, France	did not qualify							
2028	Los Angeles, United States	to be determined							
2032	Brisbane, Australia	to be determined							
Total		10th place	50	6	9	35	61	159	

=== World Cup ===
FIH World Cup record
Year	Round	Position	Pld	W	D*	L	GF	GA	Squad
(Spain) 1971	did not participate								
(Netherlands) 1973	did not participate								
(Malaysia) 1975	did not qualify								
(Argentina) 1978	11th place game	11th	8	2	2	4	15	19	Squad
(India) 1982	did not qualify								
(England) 1986	9th place game	10th	7	1	1	5	6	16	Squad
(Pakistan) 1990	11th place game	11th	7	1	1	5	6	11	Squad
(Australia) 1994	did not qualify								
(Netherlands) 1998	7th place game	8th	7	1	3	3	16	18	Squad
(Malaysia) 2002	did not qualify								
(Germany) 2006	did not qualify								
(India) 2010	11th place game	11th	6	1	0	5	9	30	Squad
(Netherlands) 2014	did not qualify								
(India) 2018	Cross-over	11th	4	0	1	3	3	13	Squad
(India) 2023	did not qualify								
(Belgium) / (Netherlands) 2026	did not qualify								
Total	Best: 8th	6/16	39	6	8	25	55	107	

=== Pan American Games ===
Pan American Games record
Year	Host	Position	Pld	W	D	L	GF	GA
1967	Winnipeg, Canada	4th	9	5	2	2	14	7
1971	Cali, Colombia	3rd	9	6	0	3	16	5
1975	Mexico City, Mexico	2nd	8	5	2	1	20	6
1979	San Juan, Puerto Rico	2nd	6	5	0	1	33	6
1983	Caracas, Venezuela	1st	6	6	0	0	25	4
1987	Indianapolis, United States	1st	6	5	1	0	42	5
1991	Havana, Cuba	2nd	6	5	0	1	33	5
1995	Mar del Plata, Argentina	2nd	7	4	2	1	31	4
1999	Winnipeg, Canada	1st	7	6	1	0	29	5
2003	Santo Domingo, Dominican Republic	2nd	5	4	0	1	10	5
2007	Rio de Janeiro, Brazil	1st	5	3	2	0	12	7
2011	Guadalajara, Mexico	2nd	5	4	0	1	25	7
2015	Toronto, Canada	2nd	6	4	1	1	21	5
2019	Lima, Peru	2nd	6	5	0	1	33	10
2023	Santiago, Chile	3rd	5	4	1	0	12	4
2027	Lima, Peru	to be determined						
Total		1st place	96	71	12	13	356	85

=== Pan American Cup ===
Pan American Cup record
Year	Host	Position	Pld	W	D	L	GF	GA
2000	Havana, Cuba	2nd	6	4	1	1	32	6
2004	London, Canada	2nd	6	5	0	1	29	5
2009	Santiago, Chile	1st	5	4	1	0	26	11
2013	Brampton, Canada	2nd	5	3	1	1	9	8
2017	Lancaster, United States	2nd	5	3	1	1	13	3
2022	Santiago, Chile	3rd	6	4	0	2	26	11
2025	Montevideo, Uruguay	3rd	4	2	0	2	11	13
Total		1st place	37	25	4	8	146	57

=== Commonwealth Games ===
Commonwealth Games record
Year	Host	Position	Pld	W	D	L	GF	GA	Squad
1998	Kuala Lumpur, Malaysia	7th	4	1	2	1	11	6	Squad
2002	Manchester, England	6th	5	0	1	4	7	14	Squad
2006	Melbourne, Australia	9th	5	1	0	4	5	16	Squad
2010	Delhi, India	7th	5	2	2	1	8	8	Squad
2014	Glasgow, Scotland	6th	5	1	0	4	8	16	Squad
2018	Gold Coast, Australia	8th	5	1	0	4	4	15	Squad
2022	Birmingham, England	8th	5	0	1	4	7	29	Squad
Total		7/7	34	6	6	22	50	104	

=== Hockey Nations Cup ===
FIH Hockey Nations Cup
Year	Round
(South Africa) 2022	8th
(Poland) 2023–24	5th

=== Sultan Azlan Shah Cup ===
Sultan Azlan Shah Cup record
Year	Position
1995	4th
1999	4th
2000	7th
2007	8th
2008	5th
2014	5th
2015	5th
2016	6th
2019	4th
2020	Cancelled
2024	6th
2025	5th
2026	Q
Best result: 4th place

=== Defunct competitions ===
==== Hockey World League ====
Hockey World League record
Season	Position	Round	Pld	W	D*	L	GF	GA
2012–13	18th	Round 2	5	3	0	2	16	13
2014–15	8th	Round 2	6	4	0	2	17	7
2014–15	8th	Semifinal	7	2	1	4	7	22
2014–15	8th	Final	5	0	0	5	6	26
2016–17	10th	Round 2	6	5	0	1	26	7
2016–17	10th	Semifinal	7	3	1	3	20	16
Total	Best: 8th	Final	36	17	2	17	92	91

==== Champions Challenge I ====
Champions Challenge I record
Year	Position	Pld	W	D*	L	GF	GA
(Malaysia) 2001 until (Belgium) 2007	did not participate						
(Argentina) 2009	8th	5	1	0	4	6	13
(South Africa) 2011	8th	6	1	0	5	10	20
(Argentina) 2012	6th	6	1	1	4	12	20
(Malaysia) 2014	2nd	6	2	2	2	14	17
Total	Best: 2nd	23	5	3	15	42	70

== Team ==
=== Current squad ===
The following 20 players were named for the 2026 Men's FIH Nations Cup, Chile from 1 March to 8 March 2026.

Caps updated as of 7 March 2026, after the match against Scotland.

No.	Pos.	Player	Date of birth (age)	Caps	Club
30	GK	Ethan McTavish	1 May 2000 (age 26)	33	(Canada) West Vancouver
32	GK	Zachary Coombs	24 April 2001 (age 25)	32	(Canada) West Vancouver
4	DF	Roopkanwar Dhillon	5 October 2001 (age 25)	36	
14	DF	Manveer Jhamat	14 November 2001 (age 25)	41	
11	DF	Balraj Panesar	16 March 1996 (age 30)	116	(England) Beeston
26	DF	Sam Cabral	23 February 1999 (age 27)	41	(Canada) UBC Thunderbirds
17	DF	Aaron Foong	21 June 2001 (age 25)	9	(Canada) West Vancouver
33	DF	Thomson Harris	15 August 1998 (age 28)	41	
5	MF	Devohn Noronha-Teixeira	9 February 1989 (age 37)	144	
22	MF	Jyothswaroop Sidhu	19 June 2002 (age 24)	19	
6	MF	Avjot Buttar	24 September 2001 (age 25)	19	
18	MF	Rowan Childs	8 April 2000 (age 26)	21	(Canada) UBC Thunderbirds
25	MF	Harbir Sidhu	14 August 1997 (age 29)	46	(Canada) India Club
16	FW	Hudson Loh	24 July 2003 (age 23)	14	(Canada) Vancouver Hawks
9	FW	Robin Thind	8 May 2006 (age 20)	9	(Canada) Surrinder Lions
13	FW	Brendan Guraliuk	14 May 2000 (age 26)	61	(Canada) Vancouver Hawks
15	FW	Sean Davis	15 July 2000 (age 26)	36	
7	FW	Matthew Sarmento	23 June 1991 (age 35)	182	(Canada) Vancouver Hawks
21	FW	Kirin Robinson	1 August 2004 (age 22)	5	
10	FW	Jude Nicholson	16 May 2006 (age 20)	20	

=== Recent call-ups ===
The following players have been called up for the team in the last 12 months.

Pos.	Player	Date of birth (age)	Caps	Club	Latest call-up
GK	Antoni Kindler	16 May 1988 (age 38)	112		2022 Pan American Cup
DF	John Smythe	31 August 1989 (age 37)	134		2022 Commonwealth Games
DF	Alexander Bird	13 May 2003 (age 23)	5		2022 Commonwealth Games
DF	James Kirkpatrick	29 March 1991 (age 35)	114	(Canada) West Vancouver	2022 Pan American Cup
MF	Keegan Pereira	8 September 1991 (age 35)	200		2022 Commonwealth Games
MF	Floris van Son	5 February 1992 (age 34)	52	(Netherlands) Hurley	2022 Commonwealth Games
MF	Sukhi Panesar	26 December 1993 (age 32)	164		2022 Pan American Cup
FW	Fin Boothroyd	9 March 1999 (age 27)	41	(England) East Grinstead	2022 Commonwealth Games
FW	Gavin Bains	18 October 1998 (age 28)	6	(Canada) India Club	2022 Commonwealth Games
FW	Iain Smythe	2 June 1985 (age 41)	205		2022 Pan American Cup

=== Famous players ===
- Patrick Burrows
- David Bissett
- Alan Brahmst
- Pat Caruso
- Paul Chohan
- Ken Goodwin
- Ravi Kahlon
- Ken Pereira
- Reg Plummer
- Trevor Porritt
- Ross Rutledge
- Nick Sandhu
- Lee Wright

== Results and fixtures ==
The following is a list of match results in the last 12 months, as well as any future matches that have been scheduled.

Win Draw Loss Fixture

=== 2026 ===
01 March 2026 WC Qualifiers GS	Ireland	5–2	Canada	Santiago, Chile
12:00	McAllister 9'; Lynch 22'; Duncan 40'; Cole 49', 52'	Report	Childs 47'; Nicholson 50'	Stadium: Estadio Nacional del Hockey Césped Claudia Schüler

03 March 2026 WC Qualifiers GS	Canada	1–2	Poland	Santiago, Chile
09:00	Nicholson 60'	Report	Jarzyński 45'; Bembenek 56'	Stadium: Estadio Nacional del Hockey Césped Claudia Schüler

04 March 2026 WC Qualifiers GS	Canada	7–2	South Korea	Santiago, Chile
11:15	Sarmento 7'; Childs 19'; Thind 22'; Davis 39', 53'; Harris 49'; Nicholson 58'	Report	Choi 7'; Jang J. 47'	Stadium: Estadio Nacional del Hockey Césped Claudia Schüler

06 March 2026 WC Qualifiers Crossover	Canada	3–2	Chile	Santiago, Chile
15:00	Loh 14'; Dhillon 50'; Davis 59'	Report	J. Amoroso 5'; R. Valenzuela 15'	Stadium: Estadio Nacional del Hockey Césped Claudia Schüler

07 March 2026 WC Qualifiers Fifth and sixth place	Scotland	5–1	Canada	Santiago, Chile
15:45	J. Golden 21', 26', 34', 36'; Douglas 59'	Report	Sarmento 38'	Stadium: Estadio Nacional del Hockey Césped Claudia Schüler

29 June 2026 Test 1	Canada	3–3 (5–4 p)	United States	Surrey, British Columbia, Canada
19:00	Guraliuk 19'; Nicholson 21'; Davis 41'	Report	Charasika 10', 46'; Leser 29'	Stadium: Tamanawis Park
	Penalties
	Davis (penalty shoot-out scored); Thind (penalty shoot-out scored); Harris (penalty shoot-out scored); H. Sidhu (penalty shoot-out missed); J. Sidhu (penalty shoot-out scored); Thind (penalty shoot-out scored)		(penalty shoot-out scored) Charasika; (penalty shoot-out scored) Johal; (penalty shoot-out scored) Montilla; (penalty shoot-out missed) Leser; (penalty shoot-out scored) Katz; (penalty shoot-out missed) Charasika

30 June 2026 Test 2	United States	2–0	Canada	Surrey, British Columbia, Canada
19:00	Charasika 9'; Bleeker 15'	Report		Stadium: Tamanawis Park

2 July 2026 Test 3	Canada	3–0	United States	Surrey, British Columbia, Canada
16:00	Thind 15', 26'; Sarmento 52'	Report		Stadium: Tamanawis Park

20 November 2026 Sultan Azlan Shah Cup RR	Pakistan	5–1	Canada	Ipoh, Malaysia
17:15	Sufyan 18', 48', 53'; M. Ammad 37'; Shahid 52'	Report	Robinson 45'	Stadium: Azlan Shah Stadium

21 November 2026 Sultan Azlan Shah Cup RR	Malaysia	6–0	Canada	Ipoh, Malaysia
19:30	Fa. Saari 2', 35', 49', 57'; Azrai 23'; Azahar 28'	Report		Stadium: Azlan Shah Stadium

23 November 2026 Sultan Azlan Shah Cup RR	Canada	v	South Korea	Ipoh, Malaysia
15:00				Stadium: Azlan Shah Stadium

24 November 2026 Sultan Azlan Shah Cup RR	Canada	v	United States	Ipoh, Malaysia
17:15				Stadium: Azlan Shah Stadium

26 November 2026 Sultan Azlan Shah Cup RR	Australia	v	Canada	Ipoh, Malaysia
15:00				Stadium: Azlan Shah Stadium

== See also ==
- Canada women's national field hockey team
- Field hockey in Canada
