= Sandeep Singh =

Indian field hockey player, politician

Sandeep Singh Saini
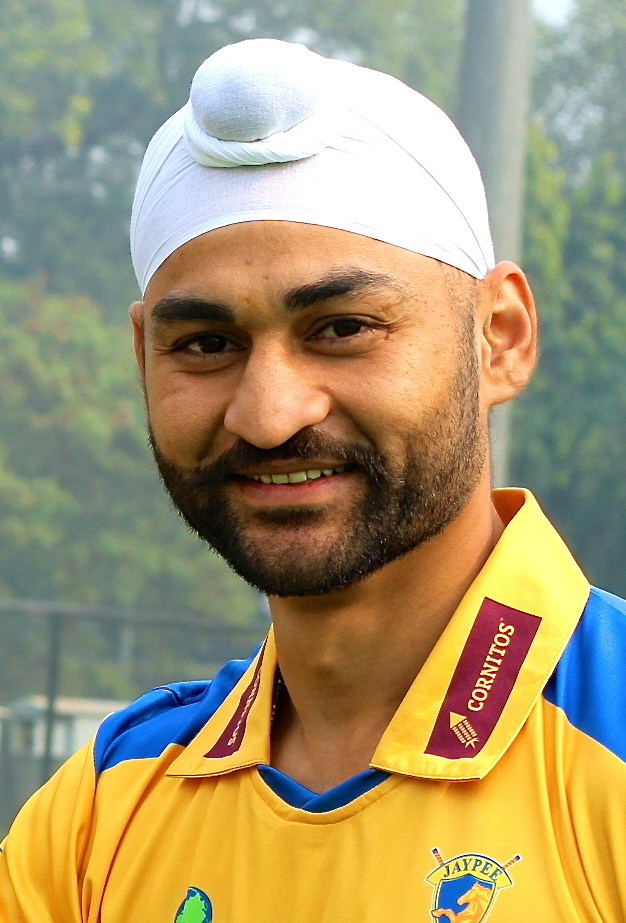

Personal information
- Full name: Sandeep Singh Saini
- Born: 27 February 1986 (age 40) Shahabad, Haryana, India
- Height: 1.84 m (6 ft 0 in)

Sport
- Sport: Field hockey
- Position: Fullback
Senior career
Years	Team	Caps	Goals
2013	Mumbai Magicians	12	11
2014–2015	Punjab Warriors	1	22
2016	Ranchi Rays	1	0
National team
Years	Team	Caps	Goals
2004–2012	India	200+	(150+)
Medal record
Men's Field hockey
Representing India
Commonwealth Games
Silver medal – second place	2010 New Delhi	Team
Asian Games
Bronze medal – third place	2010 Guangzhou	Team
Champions Challenge
Bronze medal – third place	2007 Belgium	Team
Sultan Azlan Shah Cup
Gold medal – first place	2009 Malaysia	Team
- Updated on 21 January 2016

Sandeep Singh (born 27 February 1986) is an Indian professional field hockey player from Haryana and an ex-captain of the Indian national hockey team. He generally features as a full back and is a penalty corner specialist for the team. He has been dubbed "Flicker Singh" in the media for his specialization of the drag-flick, one of the fastest in the world.

Singh holds a DSP rank in the Haryana Police. He has been elected as MLA in 2019 from Pehowa constituency in Kurukshetra, Haryana from Bharatiya Janata Party. He served as the Sports Minister of Haryana and resigned from the post on 1 January 2023, after the Haryana police registered a case against him for a sexual assault complaint.

== Early life ==
Singh hails from Shahabad town in Kurukshetra, Haryana. He was educated at Shivalik Public School, Mohali. Sandeep was born to Gurucharan Singh Saini and Daljeet Kaur Saini. Sandeep has an older brother, Bikramjeet, also a field hockey player who plays for Indian Oil.

== Career ==
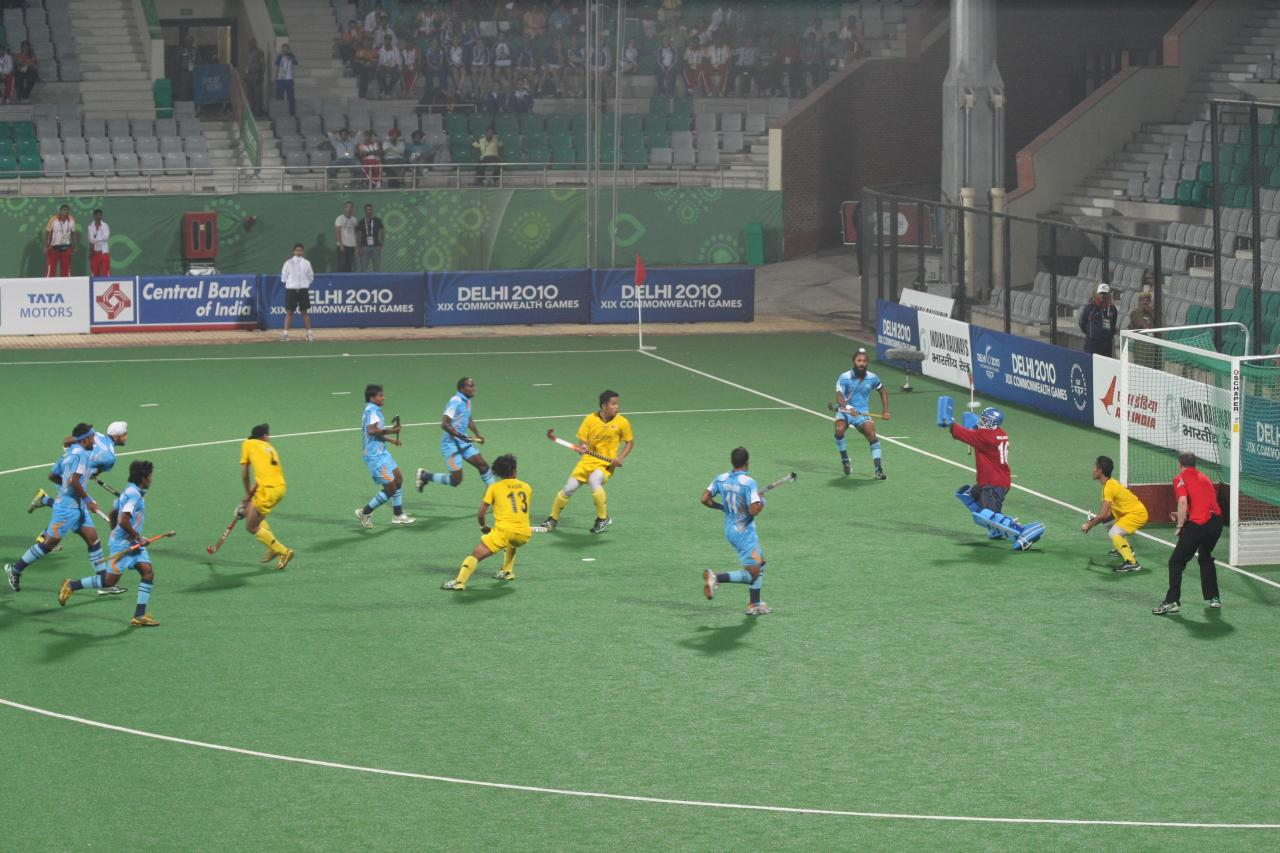
Sandeep Singh Hockey Game

=== International hockey ===
Sandeep's international debut was in January 2004 in Sultan Azlan Shah Cup in Kuala Lumpur. He took over as the captain of the Indian national team in January 2009, and Rajpal Singh succeeded him later in 2010. Singh is a well known drag-flicker. At a time he was said to have the best speed in the world in drag flick (speed 145 km/h). Under his captaincy, the Indian team managed to clinch the Sultan Azlan Shah Cup in 2009 after defeating Malaysia in the finals at Ipoh. India won the title after a long wait of 13 years. Singh was also the top goal scorer of the Sultan Azlan Shah Cup tournament.

The India men's national field hockey team have qualified for the 2012 Summer Olympics in London after a gap of 8 years. The team had a resounding victory over France in the finals of the Olympic qualifiers by beating France 9–1. Ace drag-flicker Singh starred in the final against France by scoring five goals – including a hat-trick – all from penalty corners (19th, 26th, 38th, 49th and 51st minutes). Singh was the highest scorer of the Olympic qualifiers tournament by scoring 16 goals.

=== Club career ===
Sandeep Singh became the fifth highest-paid marquee player at the inaugural Hockey India League as the Mumbai franchise bought him for US$64,400 with his base price being US$27,800. The Mumbai team has been named Mumbai Magicians. Scoring 11 goals in 12 games, Singh emerged as the top scorer in the first edition of the league. In 2014, he was signed by Punjab Warriors. After playing two seasons for the team, he was signed by Ranchi Rays for US$81,000 in 2015 starting 2016.

In 2014, Singh relocated to the UK to play for Havant Hockey Club.

On 22 August 2006, Singh was seriously injured after being hit by an accidental gunshot in the Kalka Shatabdi Express train, while on his way to join the national team due to leave for the World Cup in Africa two days later. He was almost paralyzed and on the wheelchair for 1 year of his life. He was 20 at that time. Singh not only recovered from that serious injury but also established himself again and played world cup for India in 2010 Indian team.

=== Political career ===
Sandeep Singh was elected from Pehowa constituency as Member of Legislative Assembly (Haryana) from Bharatiya Janata Party during the 2019 Haryana Legislative Assembly election. He was sworn in as Minister of Sports and Youth Affairs (MoS) and Minister of Printing and Stationery (MoS) (Independent Charge).

== Career achievements ==
- Sandeep Singh scored the most goals and won the Man of the Tournament award in the 2009 Sultan Azlan Shah Cup.
- Scoring 16 goals, Singh was the leading goal scorer in the qualifying tournament for the 2012 London Olympics - scored five goals in the final.
- April 2004: Junior Asia Cup top scorer - scored 16 goals.
- 2008: Sultan Azlan Shah Cup - Sandeep was top scorer.
- 2009: Sultan Azlan Shah Cup - Sandeep was top scorer.
- 2010: Asia Games top scorer - scored 11 goals.
- 2010: World record for fastest drag flick - 145 km/h.
- 2013: Hockey India League - Top scorer - 11 goals in 12 games.
- 2014: Hockey India League - Top scorer - 11 goals.

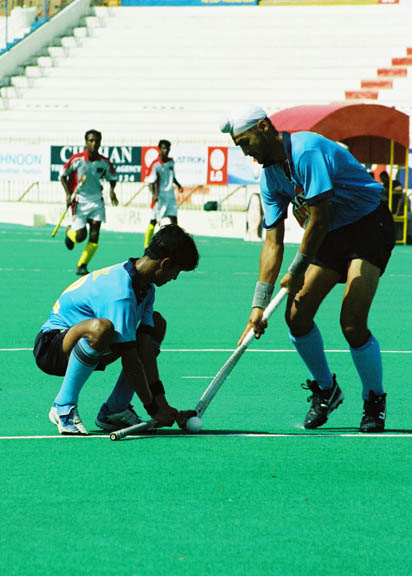
Sandeep Singh in 2004.

== Awards ==
- 2010: Arjuna Award recipient for achievements in field hockey.
- 2012: Olympic qualifier tournament gold medal.
- 2009: Sultan Azlan Shah Cup - Best Player.

== In popular culture ==
Indian filmmaker Shaad Ali made a biographical film, titled Soorma (lit. 'Warrior'), based on Singh's life. Diljit Dosanjh played Sandeep Singh's role in the film. It was released on 13 July 2018. The film also stars Taapsee Pannu and Angad Bedi.

Singh appeared as a judge on the Indian reality television series MTV Roadies (Roadies: Real Heroes) on MTV India.

== Controversy ==
In December 2022, a junior athletics coach filed a complaint alleging that Sandeep Singh had sexually harassed her. Following this, a case was registered against Singh on 1 January 2023 for sexual harassment and criminal intimidation. The woman complained that Sandeep Singh called her to his camp office and sexually assaulted her. He denied the allegation and alleged that the complaint aims to commit personal vendetta against him. He resigned from the post of Sports Minister following the registration of case against him and handed over his portfolio to Chief Minister.
