= John Smythe (field hockey) =

Canadian field hockey player (born 1989)

Personal information
- Full name: John Barrie Smythe
- Born: August 31, 1989 (age 36) Vancouver, Canada
- Height: 1.77 m (5 ft 10 in)

Sport
- Sport: Field hockey
- Position: Defender / Midfielder
- Club: Vancouver Hawks
National team
Years	Team	Caps	Goals
2013–present	Canada	136	(3)
Medal record
Men's field hockey
Representing Canada
Pan American Games
Silver medal – second place	2019 Lima	Team
Pan American Cup
Silver medal – second place	2017 Lancaster
- Updated on 24 July 2021

John Barrie Smythe (born August 31, 1989) is a Canadian field hockey player who plays as a defender or midfielder for the Vancouver Hawks and the Canadian national team.

His older brother Iain Smythe also is a Canadian international field hockey player.

== International career ==
Smythe represented Canada at the 2018 World Cup, where he played all four games. In June 2019, he was selected in the Canada squad for the 2019 Pan American Games. They won the silver medal as they lost 5–2 to Argentina in the final.

In June 2021, Smythe was named to Canada's 2020 Summer Olympics team.
