= Ken Goodwin (field hockey) =

Canadian field hockey player

Medal record

Men's field hockey

Representing Canada

Pan American Games
Gold medal – first place	1987 Indianapolis	Team
Silver medal – second place	1991 Havana	Team

Ken Goodwin (born March 2, 1961, in Provost, Alberta) is a former field hockey goalkeeper from Canada, who participated in two consequentive Summer Olympics for his native country, starting in 1984. After having finished in tenth position in Los Angeles, California, Goodwin ended up in eleventh place in the Seoul Games with the Men's National Team. Ken was inducted into the Alberta Sports Hall of Fame in 2008.

== International senior competitions ==
- 1984 – Olympic Games, Los Angeles (10th)
- 1988 – Olympic Games, Seoul (11th)
