= 1998 Sultan Azlan Shah Cup =

Field hockey tournament

Tournament details
- Host country: Malaysia
- City: Ipoh
- Teams: 6
- Venue: Azlan Shah Stadium

Final positions
- Champions: Australia (2nd title)
- Runner-up: Germany
- Third place: South Korea

The 1998 Sultan Azlan Shah Cup was the eighth edition of field hockey tournament the Sultan Azlan Shah Cup.

== Participating nations ==
Six countries participated in the tournament:

- New Zealand
- Malaysia
- Australia
- Germany
- South Korea
- England

== Final ranking ==
- This ranking does not reflect the actual performance of the team as the ranking issued by the International Hockey Federation. This is just a benchmark ranking in the Sultan Azlan Shah Cup only.

Position	Team
1	Australia
2	Germany
3	South Korea
4	New Zealand
5	England
6	Malaysia
