= Field hockey at the 2006 South Asian Games =

Field Hockey at the 2006 South Asian Games

Tournament details
- Host country: Sri Lanka
- City: Matale
- Dates: 21 August 2006–25 August 2006
- Teams: 4
- Venue: 1

Final positions
- Champions: Pakistan (1st title)
- Runner-up: India
- Third place: Sri Lanka

Tournament statistics
- Matches played: 8
- Goals scored: 40 (5 per match)

Field hockey at the 2006 South Asian Games for men was the second edition of Field hockey at the South Asian Games, held in Nandamithra Ekanayake International Hockey Ground, Matale, Sri Lanka from 21 – 25 August 2006. Pakistan won the gold medal after beating India.

== Teams ==
- Bangladesh
- India
- Pakistan
- Sri Lanka

== Results ==
Results
| Teams | Bangladesh | India | Pakistan | Sri Lanka |
|---|---|---|---|---|
| Bangladesh | — | 0–4 | 2–5 | 1–0 |
| India | 4–0 | — | 2–0 | 9–1 |
| Pakistan | 5–2 | 0–2 | — | 8–1 |
| Sri Lanka | 0–1 | 1–9 | 1–8 | — |

=== Medal matches ===
==== Bronze medal match ====
(bronze) Sri Lanka 2–0 Bangladesh

==== Gold medal match ====
(silver) India 2–3 Pakistan (gold)

== Winner ==
Men's Field Hockey at the 2006 South Asian Games

Pakistan
First title

== Medallists ==
| Gold | Silver | Bronze |
| Pakistan | India | Sri Lanka |
