= 2009 Sultan Azlan Shah Cup =

2009 field hockey tournament

Tournament details
- Host country: Malaysia
- City: Ipoh
- Dates: 5–12 April
- Teams: 5 (from 3 confederations)
- Venue: Azlan Shah Stadium

Final positions
- Champions: India (4th title)
- Runner-up: Malaysia
- Third place: New Zealand

Tournament statistics
- Matches played: 12
- Goals scored: 44 (3.67 per match)
- Top scorer: (India) Sandeep Singh (6 goals)
- Best player: (India) Sandeep Singh

The 2009 Sultan Azlan Shah Cup was the 18th edition of the Sultan Azlan Shah Cup. It was held in Ipoh, Malaysia from 5 to 12 April 2009.

India won the tournament for the fourth time by defeating the hosts Malaysia 3–1 in the final.

== Teams ==
Five countries participated in the tournament:

Team	Appearance	Last Appearance	Previous best performance
Egypt	1st	–	–
India	13th	2008	1st (1985, 1991, 1995)
Malaysia	18th	2008	2nd (1985, 2007)
New Zealand	11th	2008	3rd (1995, 2003, 2008)
Pakistan	15th	2008	1st (1999, 2000, 2003)

== Results ==
All times are local, MYT (UTC+8).

=== Pool ===
Pos	Team	Pld	W	D	L	GF	GA	GD	Pts	Qualification
1	India	4	2	2	0	9	5	+4	8	Final
2	Malaysia (H)	4	2	1	1	8	7	+1	7	Final
3	New Zealand	4	1	3	0	7	6	+1	6	Third Place Match
4	Pakistan	4	1	0	3	9	8	+1	3	Third Place Match
5	Egypt	4	0	2	2	4	11	−7	2	

Source: Azlan Shah Cup
(H) Hosts

5 April 2009
17:00

Egypt	2–2	India
Hassan 8'; El-Saied 70'	Report	Sandeep 14'; Shivendra 50'

Umpires:
Haider Rasool (PAK)
Gareth Greenfield (NZL)

5 April 2009
19:00

Pakistan	2–3	Malaysia
Imran 10'; Haider 68'	Report	Rahim 9'; Shahrun 29'; Azlan 48'

Umpires:
Sayed Del-Rady (EGY)
Deon Nel (RSA)

6 April 2009
17:00

New Zealand	3–2	Pakistan
Bhana 5'; Haig 43'; Couzins 68'	Report	Imran 6', 23'

Umpires:
Deon Nel (RSA)
Raghu Prasad (IND)

6 April 2009
19:00

Malaysia	4–1	Egypt
Ismail 27'; Engku 39'; Chua 64', 68'	Report	El-Hakiem 45'

Umpires:
Gareth Greenfield (NZL)
Francisco Vázquez (ESP)

8 April 2009
17:00

Egypt	1–1	New Zealand
El-Hakiem 38'	Report	Edwards 51'

Umpires:
Francisco Vázquez (ESP)
Haider Rasool (PAK)

8 April 2009
19:00

Malaysia	0–3	India
	Report	Halappa 19'; Sandeep 31'; Gurwinder 62'

Umpires:
Sayed Del-Rady (EGY)
Gareth Greenfield (NZL)

9 April 2009
17:00

India	2–2	New Zealand
Sandeep 27', 48'	Report	Petherick 8'; Bartholomew 63'

Umpires:
Sayed Del-Rady (EGY)
Haider Rasool (PAK)

9 April 2009
19:00

Pakistan	4–0	Egypt
Imran 14'; Abbasi 18', 43', 67'	Report

Umpires:
Deon Nel (RSA)
Raghu Prasad (IND)

11 April 2009
17:00

India	2–1	Pakistan
Sandeep 28', 60'	Report	Saqlain 50'

Umpires:
Gareth Greenfield (NZL)
Deon Nel (RSA)

11 April 2009
19:00

New Zealand	1–1	Malaysia
Wilson 49'	Report	Chua 48'

Umpires:
Raghu Prasad (IND)
Francisco Vázquez (ESP)

=== Classification round ===
==== Third and fourth place ====
12 April 2009
17:00

New Zealand	2–1	Pakistan
Petherick 12'; Baker 13'	Report	Abbasi 35'

Umpires:
Francisco Vázquez (ESP)
Sayed Del-Rady (EGY)

==== Final ====
12 April 2009
19:30

India	3–1	Malaysia
Halappa 8'; Prabhjot 20'; Shivendra 41'	Report	Azlan 11'

Umpires:
Deon Nel (RSA)
Gareth Greenfield (NZL)

== Statistics ==
=== Final standings ===
Pos	Team	Pld	W	D	L	GF	GA	GD	Pts	Qualification
1st place, gold medalist(s)	India	5	3	2	0	12	6	+6	11	Gold Medal
2nd place, silver medalist(s)	Malaysia (H)	5	2	1	2	9	10	−1	7	Silver Medal
3rd place, bronze medalist(s)	New Zealand	5	2	3	0	9	7	+2	9	Bronze Medal
4	Pakistan	5	1	0	4	10	10	0	3	
5	Egypt	4	0	2	2	4	11	−7	2	

Source: Azlan Shah Cup
(H) Hosts

=== Goalscorers ===
There were 44 goals scored in 12 matches, for an average of 3.67 goals per match.

6 goals

- (India) Sandeep Singh

4 goals

- (Pakistan) Shakeel Abbasi
- (Pakistan) Muhammad Imran

3 goals

- (Malaysia) Chua Boon Huat

2 goals

- (Egypt) Ahmed El-Hakiem
- (India) Shivendra Singh
- (India) Arjun Halappa
- (Malaysia) Azlan Misron
- (New Zealand) Richard Petherick

1 goal

- (Egypt) Amr El-Saied
- (Egypt) Mohamed Hussain
- (India) Gurwinder Singh Chandi
- (India) Prabhjot Singh
- (Malaysia) Ismail Abu
- (Malaysia) Engku Malek
- (Malaysia) Shahrun Nabil
- (Malaysia) Amin Rahim
- (New Zealand) Joel Baker
- (New Zealand) Joseph Bartholomew
- (New Zealand) Priyesh Bhana
- (New Zealand) Dean Couzins
- (New Zealand) Steven Edwards
- (New Zealand) Nicholas Haig
- (New Zealand) Nicholas Wilson
- (Pakistan) Abbas Haider
- (Pakistan) Muhammad Saqlain
