= 2018 Sultan Azlan Shah Cup =

Malaysian men's field hockey tournament

Tournament details
- Host country: Malaysia
- City: Ipoh
- Dates: 3 March 2018–10 March 2018
- Teams: 6
- Venue: Azlan Shah Stadium

Final positions
- Champions: Australia (10th title)
- Runner-up: England
- Third place: Argentina

Tournament statistics
- Matches played: 18
- Goals scored: 87 (4.83 per match)
- Top scorer: (Argentina) Gonzalo Peillat (8 goals)

The 2018 Sultan Azlan Shah Cup was the 27th edition of the Sultan Azlan Shah Cup. It was held in Ipoh, Perak, Malaysia from 3 to 10 March 2018.

The number of teams for this year's cup was the same as last year's tournament where six teams competed. Japan and New Zealand, who competed previously, did not join this edition and were replaced by Argentina and Ireland. England was Great Britain's only country that participated in this edition.

Australia clinched their tenth title in this tournament after defeating England 2–1 in the final match.

== Participating nations ==
Six countries participated in this year's tournament:

- Malaysia (Host)
- Argentina
- Australia
- England
- India
- Ireland

== Results ==
All times are in Malaysia Standard Time (UTC+08:00).

=== Pool ===
Pos	Team	Pld	W	D	L	GF	GA	GD	Pts	Qualification
1	Australia	5	5	0	0	18	6	+12	15	Advance to Final
2	England	5	2	2	1	14	9	+5	8	Advance to Final
3	Argentina	5	2	1	2	11	11	0	7	Third place match
4	Malaysia (H)	5	2	0	3	10	17	−7	6	Third place match
5	India	5	1	1	3	12	12	0	4	Fifth place match
6	Ireland	5	1	0	4	9	19	−10	3	Fifth place match

Source: FIH
Rules for classification: 1) points; 2) goal difference; 3) goals scored; 4) head-to-head result.
(H) Hosts

3 March 2018
16:00 MST

Argentina	3–2	India
Peillat 13', 24', 33'	Report	Rohidas 26', 31'

Umpires:
Paul Walker (ENG)
Rohizan Ramli (MAS)

3 March 2018
18:00 MST

Australia	4–1	England
Wotherspoon 15'; Govers 19'; Kleinschmidt 28'; Sharp 39'	Report	Roper 25'

Umpires:
Ben Goentgen (GER)
Gabriel Labate (ARG)

3 March 2018
20:30 MST

Malaysia	4–1	Ireland
Razie 4', 24', 44'; Ahmad 9'	Report	Shimmins 53'

Umpires:
David Tomlinson (NZL)
Gurbaj Singh (IND)

4 March 2018
16:00 MST

India	1–1	England
Lakra 14'	Report	M. Gleghorne 52'

Umpires:
Kris Cholewa (IRL)
Ben Goentgen (GER)

4 March 2018
18:00 MST

Ireland	3–5	Argentina
O'Donoghue 12'; Murray 17'; Magee 52'	Report	Peillat 20', 23', 47'; Vila 22'; Gilardi 30'

Umpires:
Rohizan Ramli (MAS)
James Unkles (AUS)

4 March 2018
20:30 MST

Malaysia	1–3	Australia
Marhan 53'	Report	Weyer 10'; Wotherspoon 29'; Kleinschmidt 43'

Umpires:
Paul Walker (ENG)
Gurbaj Singh (IND)

6 March 2018
16:00 MST

England	4–1	Ireland
Middleton 15', 60'; Ward 37', 51'	Report	Dale 39'

Umpires:
Gabriel Labate (ARG)
James Unkles (AUS)

6 March 2018
18:00 MST

India	2–4	Australia
Ramandeep 52', 53'	Report	Knowles 28'; Zalewski 35'; Beale 38'; Govers 40'

Umpires:
Rohizan Ramli (MAS)
David Tomlinson (NZL)

6 March 2018
20:30 MST

Malaysia	2–1	Argentina
Ahmad 20'; Najmi 28'	Report	Paz 32'

Umpires:
Kris Cholewa (IRL)
Paul Walker (ENG)

7 March 2018
16:00 MST

Australia	4–1	Ireland
Whetton 11'; Beale 14'; Govers 21'; Harvie 50'	Report	O'Donoghue 57'

Umpires:
Gurbaj Singh (IND)
Gabriel Labate (ARG)

7 March 2018
18:00 MST

Argentina	1–1	England
Gilardi 40'	Report	Condon 56'

Umpires:
Kris Cholewa (IRL)
David Tomlinson (NZL)

7 March 2018
20:30 MST

India	5–1	Malaysia
Lakra 10'; Gurjant 42', 57'; Kumar 48'; Ramandeep 51'	Report	Faizal 33'

Umpires:
James Unkles (AUS)
Ben Goentgen (GER)

9 March 2018
16:00 MST

Argentina	1–3	Australia
Peillat 21'	Report	Kleinschmidt 25', 56'; Mitton 55'

Umpires:
Paul Walker (ENG)
Ben Goentgen (GER)

9 March 2018
18:00 MST

Ireland	3–2	India
O'Donoghue 24'; Murray 36'; Cole 42'	Report	Ramandeep 10'; Rohidas 26'

Umpires:
Rohizan Ramli (MAS)
James Unkles (AUS)

9 March 2018
20:30 MST

England	7–2	Malaysia
M. Gleghorne 10', 48'; Willars 11'; Middleton 15', 31'; Ward 38', 41'	Report	Ahmad 50'; Marhan 52'

Umpires:
Gabriel Labate (ARG)
David Tomlinson (NZL)

=== Classification ===
==== Fifth and sixth place ====
10 March 2018
15:30 MST

India	4–1	Ireland
Kumar 5', 32'; Lakra 28'; Gurjant 37'	Report	Dale 48'

Umpires:
Paul Walker (ENG)
Gabriel Labate (ARG)

==== Third and fourth place ====
10 March 2018
18:00 MST

Argentina	3–2	Malaysia
Lopez 1'; Peillat 11'; P. Ibarra 49'	Report	van Huizen 24'; Faizal 27'

Umpires:
Kris Cholewa (IRL)
Gurbaj Singh (IND)

==== Final ====
10 March 2018
20:30 MST

Australia	2–1	England
Govers 38'; Sharp 53'	Report	Ward 54'

Umpires:
David Tomlinson (NZL)
Ben Goentgen (GER)

== Awards ==
Top Goalscorer	Player of the Tournament	Goalkeeper of the Tournament	Player of the Final	Fairplay Award
(Argentina) Gonzalo Peillat	(Australia) Daniel Beale	(England) George Pinner	(Australia) Mark Knowles	Australia

== Final standings ==
Pos	Team	Pld	W	D	L	GF	GA	GD	Pts	Final Result
1st place, gold medalist(s)	Australia	6	6	0	0	20	7	+13	18	Gold Medal
2nd place, silver medalist(s)	England	6	2	2	2	15	11	+4	8	Silver Medal
3rd place, bronze medalist(s)	Argentina	6	3	1	2	14	13	+1	10	Bronze Medal
4	Malaysia (H)	6	2	0	4	12	20	−8	6	
5	India	6	2	1	3	16	13	+3	7	
6	Ireland	6	1	0	5	10	23	−13	3	

Source: FIH
(H) Hosts

== Goalscorers ==
There were 87 goals scored in 18 matches, for an average of 4.83 goals per match.

8 goals

- (Argentina) Gonzalo Peillat

5 goals

- (England) Samuel Ward

4 goals

- (Australia) Blake Govers
- (Australia) Aaron Kleinschmidt
- (England) Barry Middleton
- (India) Ramandeep Singh

3 goals

- (England) Mark Gleghorne
- (India) Shilanand Lakra
- (India) Amit Rohidas
- (India) Gurjant Singh
- (Ireland) Shane O'Donoghue
- (Malaysia) Razie Rahim
- (Malaysia) Tengku Ahmad Tajuddin

2 goals

- (Argentina) Juan Ignacio Gilardi
- (Australia) Daniel Beale
- (Australia) Lachlan Sharp
- (Australia) Dylan Wotherspoon
- (India) Varun Kumar
- (Ireland) Julian Dale
- (Ireland) Sean Murray
- (Malaysia) Marhan Jalil
- (Malaysia) Faizal Saari

1 goal

- (Argentina) Pedro Ibarra
- (Argentina) Juan Martín López
- (Argentina) Diego Paz
- (Argentina) Lucas Vila
- (Australia) Jake Harvie
- (Australia) Mark Knowles
- (Australia) Trent Mitton
- (Australia) Corey Weyer
- (Australia) Jacob Whetton
- (Australia) Aran Zalewski
- (England) David Condon
- (England) Phillip Roper
- (England) Oliver Willars
- (India) Sumit Kumar
- (Ireland) Lee Cole
- (Ireland) Eugene Magee
- (Ireland) Kirk Shimmins
- (Malaysia) Joel van Huizen
- (Malaysia) Najmi Jazlan

Source: FIH
