= Sumit Kumar (field hockey) =

Indian field hockey player (born 1997)

Personal information
- Born: 11 May 1997 (age 29) Varanasi, Uttar Pradesh, India

Sport
- Sport: Field hockey
- Position: Forward
- Club: ONGC
Senior career
Years	Team	Caps	Goals
2024–	Delhi SG Pipers	-	-
National team
Years	Team	Caps	Goals
2018–	India	151	(8)
Medal record
Men's field hockey
Representing India
Hockey Junior Asia Cup
Gold medal – first place	2015 Kuantan

Sumit Kumar (born 11 May 1997) is an Indian field hockey player who plays as a Forward. He is in the Indian squad at the 2014 Sultan of Johor Cup.
