= 2014 Sultan Azlan Shah Cup =

Malaysian field hockey tournament

Tournament details
- Host country: Malaysia
- City: Ipoh
- Dates: 13 March 2014–23 March 2014
- Teams: 6
- Venue(s): Azlan Shah Stadium

Final positions
- Champions: Australia (8th title)
- Runner-up: Malaysia
- Third place: South Korea

Tournament statistics
- Matches played: 18
- Goals scored: 107 (5.94 per match)
- Top scorer(s): (Australia) Nicholas Budgeon (8 goals)

The 2014 Sultan Azlan Shah Cup was the 23rd edition of the Sultan Azlan Shah Cup, a field hockey tournament. It was held in Ipoh, Perak, Malaysia from 13 to 23 March.

As with the previous tournament, six teams competed. India, New Zealand and Pakistan, who competed previously, did not join this edition and were replaced by Canada, China, and South Africa.

== Participating nations ==
Six countries participated in the 2014 tournament:

- Malaysia (Host)
- Australia
- Canada
- China
- South Korea
- South Africa

== Umpires ==
1. Javed Shaikh (IND)
2. David Sweetman (SCO)
3. Ben de Young (AUS)
4. Deric Leung (CAN)
5. Iskandar Rusli (MAS)
6. Shin Dong-yoon (KOR)
7. Tao Zhinan (CHN)
8. John Wright (RSA)

== Results ==
All times are in Malaysia Standard Time (UTC+08:00).

=== Pool ===
Pos	Team	Pld	W	D	L	GF	GA	GD	Pts	Qualification
1	Australia	5	5	0	0	31	3	+28	15	Advance to Final
2	Malaysia (H)	5	3	1	1	17	14	+3	10	Advance to Final
3	South Korea	5	3	1	1	14	11	+3	10	Third place match
4	China	5	1	0	4	13	21	−8	3	Third place match
5	Canada	5	1	0	4	7	18	−11	3	Fifth place match
6	South Africa	5	1	0	4	7	22	−15	3	Fifth place match

Updated to match(es) played on 22 March 2014. Source: FIH
Rules for classification: 1) points; 2) goal difference; 3) goals scored; 4) head-to-head result.
(H) Hosts

13 March 2014
18:05 MST

Australia	7 –0	China
Budgeon 3', 56', 65'; Mitton 20'; Dwyer 34'; Whetton 37'; Ford 47'	Report

Umpires:
John Wright (RSA)
Shin Dong-yoon (KOR)

13 March 2014
20:05 MST

South Africa	2–3	Malaysia
Eustice 16', 57'	Report	Shahril 10'; Rashid 42'; Faizal 63'

Umpires:
David Sweetman (SCO)
Tao Zhinan (CHN)

14 March 2014
18:05 MST

South Korea	3–0	Canada
Jang 7'; Kang Moon-kw. 11', 16'	Report

Umpires:
Javed Shaikh (IND)
Iskandar Rusli (MAS)

14 March 2014
20:05 MST

China	5–0	South Africa
Dong 3'; Sun 7'; Wang B. 14'; Zhang 20'; Meng W. 27'	Report

Umpires:
Ben de Young (AUS)
Deric Leung (CAN)

16 March 2014
16:05 MST

Australia	6–0	Canada
Simpson 10'; Hayward 26'; Budgeon 35'; Ford 46'; Whetton 53', 63'	Report

Umpires:
David Sweetman (SCO)
Javed Shaikh (IND)

16 March 2014
20:05 MST

South Korea	2–2	Malaysia
Oh 10', 30'	Report	Shahril 58'; Faizal 65'

Umpires:
John Wright (RSA)
Ben de Young (AUS)

17 March 2014
16:05 MST

South Africa	0–7	Australia
	Report	Mitton 30'; Dwyer 34', 46'; Budgeon 35'; Ciriello 52'; Beale 55'; Knowles 62'

Umpires:
Deric Leung (CAN)
Tao Zhinan (CHN)

17 March 2014
18:05 MST

China	2–3	South Korea
Zhang 32'; Du T. 37'	Report	Kim S. 19'; Jang 50', 66'

Umpires:
Iskandar Rusli (MAS)
John Wright (RSA)

17 March 2014
20:05 MST

Malaysia	3–1	Canada
Faizal 4', 46'; Kazamirul 67'	Report	Froese 15'

Umpires:
Javed Shaikh (IND)
Shin Dong-yoon (KOR)

19 March 2014
18:05 MST

Canada	2–3	South Africa
Tupper 12'; Guest 49'	Report	Drummond 28'; Tsolekile 33'; Hykes 67'

Umpires:
Ben de Young (AUS)
Tao Zhinan (CHN)

19 March 2014
20:05 MST

Malaysia	7–3	China
Marhan 6'; Azlan 9'; Izad 24'; Ahmad 26'; Shahril 30'; Fitri 45'; Firhan 62'	Report	E 44'; Du T. 61', 66'

Umpires:
Deric Leung (CAN)
David Sweetman (SCO)

20 March 2014
18:05 MST

Canada	4–3	China
Guest 1', 15'; Johnston 33'; Smythe 64'	Report	Guo 3'; Yue 46'; Du T. 59'

Umpires:
Iskandar Rusli (MAS)
Shin Dong-yoon (KOR)

20 March 2014
20:05 MST

South Korea	1–5	Australia
Jang 32'	Report	Mitton 10'; Budgeon 35'; Hayward 59'; Gohdes 63', 70'

Umpires:
Javed Shaikh (IND)
John Wright (RSA)

22 March 2014
18:05 MST

Australia	6–2	Malaysia
Budgeon 17'; Ciriello 38', 59'; Ford 42'; Beale 43'; Hayward 46'	Report	Faizal 61', 70'

Umpires:
John Wright (RSA)
Javed Shaikh (IND)

22 March 2014
18:05 MST

South Africa	2–5	South Korea
Malgraff 18'; B. Panther 69'	Report	Jung 22'; Kang Moon-kw. 26'; Hyun 42'; Kang Moon-ky. 68'; Jang 70'

Umpires:
Ben de Young (AUS)
David Sweetman (SCO)

=== Classification ===
==== Fifth and sixth place ====
23 March 2014
15:35 MST

Canada	2–0	South Africa
Froese 62'; Curran 66'	Report

Umpires:
David Sweetman (SCO)
Iskandar Rusli (MAS)

==== Third and fourth place ====
23 March 2014
18:05 MST

South Korea	3–2	China
Kim Y. 20'; Jang 24', 70'	Report	Du T. 31'; Sun 39'

Umpires:
Ben de Young (AUS)
Deric Leung (CAN)

==== Final ====
23 March 2014
20:05 MST

Australia	8–3	Malaysia
Ciriello 6', 17', 42', 52'; Ockenden 11'; Budgeon 46'; Gohdes 65'; White 68'	Report	Shahril 24'; Rashid 40'; Fitri 67'

Umpires:
John Wright (RSA)
Javed Shaikh (IND)

== Final standings ==
Pos	Team	Pld	W	D	L	GF	GA	GD	Pts	Final Result
1st place, gold medalist(s)	Australia	6	6	0	0	39	6	+33	18	Gold Medal
2nd place, silver medalist(s)	Malaysia (H)	6	3	1	2	20	22	−2	10	Silver Medal
3rd place, bronze medalist(s)	South Korea	6	4	1	1	17	13	+4	13	Bronze Medal
4	China	6	1	0	5	15	24	−9	3	
5	Canada	6	2	0	4	9	18	−9	6	
6	South Africa	6	1	0	5	7	24	−17	3	

Source: FIH
(H) Hosts

== Goalscorers ==
There were 107 goals scored in 18 matches, for an average of 5.94 goals per match.

8 goals

- (Australia) Nicholas Budgeon

7 goals

- (Australia) Christopher Ciriello
- (South Korea) Jang Jong-hyun

6 goals

- (Malaysia) Faizal Saari

5 goals

- (China) Du Talake

4 goals

- (Malaysia) Shahril Saabah

3 goals

- (Australia) Jamie Dwyer
- (Australia) Russell Ford
- (Australia) Matthew Gohdes
- (Australia) Jeremy Hayward
- (Australia) Trent Mitton
- (Australia) Jacob Whetton
- (Canada) Matthew Guest
- (South Korea) Kang Moon-kweon

2 goals

- (Australia) Daniel Beale
- (Canada) Adam Froese
- (China) Sun Long
- (China) Zhang Zhixuan
- (Malaysia) Rashid Baharom
- (Malaysia) Fitri Saari
- (South Africa) Jethro Eustice
- (South Korea) Oh Dae-keun

1 goal

- (Australia) Mark Knowles
- (Australia) Edward Ockenden
- (Australia) Glenn Simpson
- (Australia) Tristan White
- (Canada) Taylor Curran
- (Canada) Gordon Johnston
- (Canada) Iain Smythe
- (Canada) Scott Tupper
- (China) Wang Bowen
- (China) E Liguang
- (China) Meng Wei
- (China) Guo Xiaoping
- (China) Dong Yang
- (China) Huang Yue
- (Malaysia) Firhan Ashaari
- (Malaysia) Izad Hakimi Jamaluddin
- (Malaysia) Marhan Jalil
- (Malaysia) Azlan Misron
- (Malaysia) Kazamirul Nasruddin
- (Malaysia) Tengku Ahmad Tajuddin
- (South Africa) Timothy Drummond
- (South Africa) Julian Hykes
- (South Africa) Ignatius Malgraff
- (South Africa) Brandon Panther
- (South Africa) Lungile Tsolekile
- (South Korea) Hyun Hye-sung
- (South Korea) Jung Man-jae
- (South Korea) Kang Moon-kyu
- (South Korea) Kim Seong-kyu
- (South Korea) Kim Young-jin

Source: FIH
