= Sultan Azlan Shah Cup =

Annual men's field hockey tournament

The Sultan Azlan Shah Cup
- Current season, competition or edition: 2026 Sultan Azlan Shah Cup
- Sport: Field hockey
- Founded: 1983; 43 years ago
- First season: 1983
- No. of teams: 6
- Country: Malaysia
- Venue: Azlan Shah Stadium
- Most recent champion: Belgium (1st title) (2025)
- Most titles: Australia (10 titles)
- Website: azlanshahcup.my

The Sultan Azlan Shah Cup is an annual invitational international men's field hockey tournament held in Malaysia. It began in 1983 as a biennial contest. The tournament became an annual event from 1998, following its growth and popularity. The tournament is named after the ninth Yang di-Pertuan Agong (king) of Malaysia, Sultan Azlan Shah, a supporter of field hockey.

Since 2007 the tournament has been held at the Azlan Shah Stadium in Ipoh, Perak. Kuala Lumpur and Penang have also hosted the tournament.

Australia have won the tournament a record 10 times, followed by India and Pakistan winning five and three times, respectively.

== Results ==
#	Year	Host	Teams	Final			Third place match		
#	Year	Host	Teams	Winner	Score	Runner-up	Third place	Score	Fourth place
1	1983; Details	Kuala Lumpur	5	Australia	1–0	Pakistan	India	5–0	Malaysia
2	1985; Details	Ipoh	6	India	4–2	Malaysia	Pakistan	2–1	Spain
3	1987; Details	Ipoh	6	West Germany	3–2	Pakistan	Great Britain	4–1	Malaysia
4	1991; Details	Ipoh	6	India	round-robin	Pakistan	Soviet Union	round-robin	New Zealand
5	1994; Details	Penang	5	England	2–2 (a.e.t.) (5–3 p.s.o.)	Pakistan	Australia	4–0	Malaysia
6	1995; Details	Kuala Lumpur	6	India	2–2 (a.e.t.) (5–4 p.s.o.)	Germany	New Zealand	3–1	Canada
7	1996; Details	Ipoh	6	South Korea	0–0 (a.e.t.) (4–2 p.s.o.)	Australia	Malaysia	2–2 (a.e.t.) (4–3 p.s.o.)	Great Britain
8	1998; Details	Ipoh	6	Australia	1–1 (a.e.t.) (10–9 p.s.o.)	Germany	South Korea	1–0	New Zealand
9	1999; Details	Kuala Lumpur	6	Pakistan	3–1	South Korea	Germany	3–2	Canada
10	2000; Details	Kuala Lumpur	7	Pakistan	1–0	South Korea	India	4–1	Malaysia
11	2001; Details	Kuala Lumpur	7	Germany	3–2	South Korea	Australia	4–3	Pakistan
12	2003; Details	Kuala Lumpur	5	Pakistan	1–0	Germany	New Zealand	3–2	South Korea
13	2004; Details	Kuala Lumpur	7	Australia	4–3	Pakistan	South Korea	6–5	Germany
14	2005; Details	Kuala Lumpur	7	Australia	4–3	South Korea	Pakistan	4–2	New Zealand
15	2006; Details	Kuala Lumpur	8	Netherlands	6–2	Australia	India	3–2	New Zealand
16	2007; Details	Ipoh	8	Australia	3–1	Malaysia	India	1–0	South Korea
17	2008; Details	Ipoh	7	Argentina	2–1	India	New Zealand	2–1	Pakistan
18	2009; Details	Ipoh	5	India	3–1	Malaysia	New Zealand	2–1	Pakistan
19	2010; Details	Ipoh	7	India & South Korea (Joint Winners)			Australia	5–3	Malaysia
20	2011; Details	Ipoh	7	Australia	3–2 (a.e.t)	Pakistan	Great Britain	4–2	New Zealand
21	2012; Details	Ipoh	7	New Zealand	1–0	Argentina	India	3–1	Great Britain
22	2013; Details	Ipoh	6	Australia	3–2	Malaysia	South Korea	2–1	New Zealand
23	2014; Details	Ipoh	6	Australia	8–3	Malaysia	South Korea	3–2	China
24	2015; Details	Ipoh	6	New Zealand	2–2 (3–1 p.s.o.)	Australia	India	2–2 (4–1 p.s.o.)	South Korea
25	2016; Details	Ipoh	7	Australia	4–0	India	New Zealand	3–3 (5–4 p.s.o.)	Malaysia
26	2017; Details	Ipoh	6	Great Britain	4–3	Australia	India	4–0	New Zealand
27	2018; Details	Ipoh	6	Australia	2–1	England	Argentina	3–2	Malaysia
28	2019; Details	Ipoh	6	South Korea	1–1 (4–2 p.s.o.)	India	Malaysia	4–2	Canada
-	2020; Details	Ipoh	6	Cancelled due to the COVID-19 pandemic.			Cancelled		
-	2021	Ipoh		Cancelled due to the COVID-19 pandemic.			Cancelled		
29	2022; Details	Ipoh	6	Malaysia	3–2	South Korea	Pakistan	5–3	Japan
30	2024; Details	Ipoh	6	Japan	2–2 (4–1 p.s.o.)	Pakistan	New Zealand	3–2	Malaysia
31	2025; Details	Ipoh	6	Belgium	1–0	India	New Zealand	6–1	Malaysia
32	2026; Details	Ipoh	6						

== Tournament summary ==
Below is a list of teams that have finished in the top four positions in the tournament:

Team	Winners	Runners-up	Third place	Fourth place
Australia	10 (1983, 1998, 2004, 2005, 2007, 2011, 2013, 2014, 2016, 2018)	4 (1996, 2006, 2015, 2017)	3 (1994, 2001, 2010)	
India	5 (1985, 1991, 1995, 2009, 2010^)	4 (2008, 2016, 2019, 2025)	7 (1983, 2000, 2006, 2007, 2012, 2015, 2017)	
Pakistan	3 (1999, 2000, 2003)	7 (1983, 1987, 1991, 1994, 2004, 2011, 2024)	3 (1985, 2005, 2022)	3 (2001, 2008, 2009)
South Korea	3 (1996, 2010^, 2019)	5 (1999, 2000, 2001, 2005, 2022)	4 (1998, 2004, 2013, 2014)	3 (2003, 2007, 2015)
Germany (Note: Includes results representing West Germany until 1990)	2 (1987, 2001)	3 (1995,1998, 2003)	1 (1999)	1 (2004)
Great Britain (Note: Includes results representing England)	2 (1994*, 2017)	1 (2018*)	2 (1987*, 2011)	2 (1996, 2012)
New Zealand	2 (2012, 2015)		7 (1995, 2003, 2008, 2009, 2016, 2024, 2025)	7 (1997, 1998, 2005, 2006, 2011, 2013, 2017)
Malaysia	1 (2022)	5 (1985, 2007, 2009, 2013, 2014)	2 (1996, 2019)	9 (1983, 1987, 1994, 2000, 2010, 2016, 2018, 2024, 2025)
Argentina	1 (2008)	1 (2012)	1 (2018)	
Japan	1 (2024)			1 (2022)
Netherlands	1 (2006)			
Belgium	1 (2025)			
Soviet Union			1 (1991)	
Canada				3 (1995, 1999, 2019)
Spain				1 (1985)
China				1 (2014)

* = Played as England in those tournaments
^ = Title was shared between two teams

=== Team appearances ===
Team	83	85	87	91	94	95	96	98	99	00	01	03	04	05	06	07	08	09	10	11	12	13	14	15	16	17	18	19	22	24	25	26	Total
Argentina	–	–	–	–	–	–	–	–	–	–	–	–	–	–	7th	5th	1st	–	–	–	2nd	–	–	–	–	–	3rd	–	–	–	–	–	5
Australia	1st	–	–	–	3rd	–	2nd	1st	–	–	3rd	–	1st	1st	2nd	1st	–	–	3rd	1st	–	1st	1st	2nd	1st	2nd	1st	–	–	–	–	Q	18
Belgium	–	–	–	–	–	–	–	–	–	–	–	–	–	–	–	–	6th	–	–	–	–	–	–	–	–	–	–	–	–	–	1st	–	2
Canada	–	–	–	–	–	4th	–	–	4th	7th	–	–	–	–	–	8th	5th	–	–	–	–	–	5th	5th	6th	–	–	4th	–	6th	5th	Q	12
China	–	–	–	–	–	–	–	–	–	–	–	–	–	–	–	7th	–	–	6th	–	–	–	4th	–	–	–	–	–	–	–	–	–	3
Egypt	–	–	–	–	–	–	–	–	–	–	–	–	–	–	–	–	–	5th	7th	–	–	–	–	–	–	–	–	–	5th	–	–	–	3
Germany	–	–	1st	–	–	2nd	–	2nd	3rd	5th	1st	2nd	4th	–	–	–	–	–	–	–	–	–	–	–	–	–	–	–	–	–	–	–	9
Great Britain	–	–	3rd	–	1st	–	4th	5th	–	–	6th	–	–	–	–	–	–	–	–	3rd	4th	–	–	–	–	1st	2nd	–	–	–	–	–	9
India	3rd	1st	–	1st	–	1st	5th	–	–	3rd	5th	–	7th	5th	3rd	3rd	2nd	1st	1st	6th	3rd	5th	–	3rd	2nd	3rd	5th	2nd	–	–	2nd	–	23
Ireland	–	–	–	–	–	–	–	–	–	–	–	–	–	–	–	–	–	–	–	–	–	–	–	–	–	–	6th	–	–	–	–	–	2
Japan	–	–	6th	–	–	–	–	–	–	–	–	–	–	–	–	–	–	–	–	–	–	–	–	–	7th	6th	–	5th	4th	1st	–	–	6
Malaysia	4th	2nd	4th	5th	4th	6th	3rd	6th	5th	4th	7th	5th	6th	6th	8th	2nd	7th	2nd	4th	7th	6th	2nd	2nd	6th	4th	5th	4th	3rd	1st	4th	4th	Q	32
Netherlands	–	–	–	–	–	–	6th	–	–	–	–	–	–	–	1st	–	–	–	–	–	–	–	–	–	–	–	–	–	–	–	–	–	2
New Zealand	5th	–	–	4th	–	3rd	–	4th	6th	6th	–	3rd	–	4th	4th	–	3rd	3rd	–	4th	1st	4th	–	1st	3rd	4th	–	–	–	3rd	3rd	–	18
Pakistan	2nd	3rd	2nd	2nd	2nd	–	–	–	1st	1st	4th	1st	2nd	3rd	5th	6th	4th	4th	5th	2nd	7th	6th	–	–	5th	–	–	–	3rd	2nd	–	Q	23
Poland	–	–	–	–	–	–	–	–	–	–	–	–	–	–	–	–	–	–	–	–	–	–	–	–	–	–	–	6th	–	–	–	–	1
South Africa	–	–	–	–	–	–	–	–	–	–	–	–	–	7th	–	–	–	–	–	–	–	–	6th	–	–	–	–	–	6th	–	–	–	3
South Korea	–	–	5th	6th	5th	–	1st	3rd	2nd	2nd	2nd	4th	3rd	2nd	6th	4th	–	–	1st	5th	5th	3rd	3rd	4th	–	–	–	1st	2nd	5th	6th	Q	23
Soviet Union	–	–	–	3rd	Defunct																												1
Spain	–	4th	–	–	–	5th	–	–	–	–	–	–	5th	–	–	–	–	–	–	–	–	–	–	–	–	–	–	–	–	–	–	–	3
United States	–	–	–	–	–	–	–	–	–	–	–	–	–	–	–	–	–	–	–	–	–	–	–	–	–	–	–	–	–	–	–	Q	1
Total (20)	5	4	6	6	5	6	6	6	6	7	7	5	7	7	8	8	7	5	7	7	7	6	6	6	7	6	6	6	6	6	6	6	

=== Performance by continental zones ===
Zone	Best performance
Asia	13 titles, won by India (5), Pakistan (3), South Korea (3), Malaysia (1) and Japan (1)
Oceania	12 titles, won by Australia (10) and New Zealand (2)
Europe	6 titles, won by Germany (2), Great Britain (2), Netherlands (1) and Belgium (1)
Americas	1 title, won by Argentina
Africa	Fifth place, achieved by Egypt (2)

== See also ==
- Sultan of Johor Cup
- Malaysian Hockey Confederation
