= 1983 Sultan Azlan Shah Cup =

Field hockey tournament

Tournament details
- Host country: Malaysia
- City: Kuala Lumpur
- Teams: 5

Final positions
- Champions: Australia (1st title)
- Runner-up: Pakistan
- Third place: India

Tournament statistics
- Matches played: 12

The 1983 Sultan Azlan Shah Cup was the inaugural edition of field hockey tournament the Sultan Azlan Shah Cup held from Aug 22–28 at the Tun Razak Stadium in Kuala Lumpur.

== Participating nations ==
Five countries participated in the first tournament:

- Malaysia
- Pakistan
- India
- Australia
- New Zealand
