= 1996 Sultan Azlan Shah Cup =

Field hockey tournament

Tournament details
- Host country: Malaysia
- City: Ipoh
- Teams: 6
- Venue: Azlan Shah Stadium

Final positions
- Champions: South Korea (1st title)
- Runner-up: Australia
- Third place: Malaysia

The 1996 Sultan Azlan Shah Cup was the seventh edition of field hockey tournament the Sultan Azlan Shah Cup.

== Participating nations ==
Six countries participated the tournament:

- Australia
- Malaysia
- Great Britain
- India
- South Korea
- Netherlands

== Final ranking ==
- This ranking does not reflect the actual performance of the team as the ranking issued by the International Hockey Federation. This is just a benchmark ranking in the Sultan Azlan Shah Cup only.

Position	Team
1	South Korea
2	Australia
3	Malaysia
4	Great Britain
5	India
6	Netherlands
