= 1985 Sultan Azlan Shah Cup =

Field hockey tournament

Tournament details
- Host country: Malaysia
- City: Ipoh
- Teams: 6 (from 3 confederations)
- Venue: Azlan Shah Stadium

Final positions
- Champions: India (1st title)
- Runner-up: Malaysia
- Third place: Pakistan

The 1985 Sultan Azlan Shah Cup was the second edition of field hockey tournament the Sultan Azlan Shah Cup.

== Participating nations ==
Six countries participated in the 1985 tournament:

- Australia
- England
- India
- Malaysia
- Pakistan
- Spain

== Results ==
=== Pool A ===
Pos	Team	Pld	W	D	L	GF	GA	GD	Pts	Qualification
1	Spain	2	2	0	0	5	3	+2	4	Semifinal
2	India	2	1	0	1	6	6	0	2	Semifinal
3	Australia	2	0	0	2	4	6	-2	0	Fifth place

==== Fixtures ====
28 November
15:40

India	2–3	Spain
Pargat 19'; Balwinder 63'	Report	Escudé 25', 37'; Ignacio 70'

29 November
15:40

Spain	2–1	Australia
Ignacio 40'; Fábregas 60'	Report	Hager 65'

30 November
15:15

India	4–3	Australia
	Report

=== Pool B ===
Pos	Team	Pld	W	D	L	GF	GA	GD	Pts	Qualification
1	Pakistan	2	1	1	0	8	2	+6	3	Semifinal
2	Malaysia	2	1	0	1	3	8	-5	2	Semifinal
3	England	2	0	1	1	2	3	-1	1	Fifth place

==== Fixtures ====
28 November
17:10

Malaysia	1–7	Pakistan
Sivabalan 24'	Report	Rashid 1', 13'; Qasim 6', 59'; Sardar 47', 52'; Hanif 67'

29 November
17:10

Pakistan	1–1	England
Rashid 10'	Report	Sherwani 39'

30 November
17:10

Malaysia	2–1	England
	Report

=== Classification round ===
==== Fifth and sixth place ====
2 December
8:00

Australia	3–3 (a.e.t.)	England
	Report
Penalties
	3 – 5

==== Semifinals ====
2 December
15:00

Spain	2–3 (a.e.t.)	Malaysia
	Report

2 December
17:00

Pakistan	0–1	India
	Report	Hardeep 42'

==== Third and fourth place ====
3 December
15:00

Pakistan	2–1	Spain
	Report

=== Final ===
3 December
17:00

Malaysia	2–4	India
Seong 52', 66'	Report	Carvalho 26'; Tikken 32'; Felix 60'; Shahid 65'

== Final standings ==
- This ranking does not reflect the actual performance of the team as the ranking issued by the International Hockey Federation. This is just a benchmark ranking in the Sultan Azlan Shah Cup only.
1. India
2. Malaysia
3. Pakistan
4. Spain
5. England
6. Australia
