= 1999 Sultan Azlan Shah Cup =

Field hockey tournament

Tournament details
- Host country: Malaysia
- City: Kuala Lumpur
- Dates: 2 April - 10 April
- Teams: 6 (from 4 confederations)
- Venue: National Hockey Stadium

Final positions
- Champions: (gold) Pakistan (1st title)
- Runner-up: (silver) South Korea
- Third place: (bronze) Germany

Tournament statistics
- Matches played: 18
- Goals scored: 86 (4.78 per match)
- Top scorer: (Pakistan) Sohail Abbas (12 goals)

The 1999 Sultan Azlan Shah Cup was the ninth edition of field hockey tournament the Sultan Azlan Shah Cup held in Kuala Lumpur, Malaysia. Pakistan won their maiden title defeating South Korea 3-1 in the final after having finished runner-ups in four out of their last eight appearances. Sohail Abbas was the competition's top scorer with 12 goals.

== Participating nations ==
Six countries participated in the year's tournament:

- Pakistan
- Malaysia
- Germany
- Canada
- South Korea
- New Zealand

== Results ==
=== Preliminary round ===
Pos	Team	Pld	W	D	L	GF	GA	GD	Pts	Qualification
1	Pakistan	5	5	0	0	26	10	+16	15	Final
2	South Korea	5	3	0	2	18	14	+4	9	Final
3	Germany	5	3	0	2	14	12	+2	9	Third Place Match
4	Canada	5	2	0	3	11	16	-5	6	Third Place Match
5	New Zealand	5	2	0	3	10	16	-6	6	Fifth Place Match
6	Malaysia	5	0	0	5	7	18	-11	0	Fifth Place Match

Fixtures

2 April 1999
16:05

Malaysia	1 – 4	New Zealand
Kuhan 48'	Report	Hari 12', 53'; Bradley 35'; Archibald 56'

2 April 1999
18:05

Pakistan	6 – 3	Canada
Bashir 10', 20', 37', 52'; Abbas 24', 46'	Report	Bird 33'; Milkovich 48'; Wettlaufer 50'

2 April 1999
20:05

Germany	4 – 3	South Korea
Tewes 49'; Weibenbor 54'; Michel 66', 69'	Report	Keon-wook 6', 39'; Kyung-seok 14'

3 April 1999
17:35

Malaysia	1 – 2	Canada
Kuhan 4'	Report	Pereira 55'; Campbell 64'

3 April 1999
19:35

Pakistan	6 – 2	South Korea
Abbas 5', 41'; Sarwar 17'; Bashir 57'; Shahbaz Jr. 46', 66'	Report	Seung-tae 11'; Keon-Wook 52'

4 April 1999
18:05

New Zealand	0 – 3	Germany
	Report	Reinelt 18'; Kopp 45'; Wein 68'

5 April 1999
16:05

South Korea	5 – 2	Canada
Jong-ha 2'; Seung-tae 39'; Hwang 50'; Jeong-seon 56'; Keon-wook 61'	Report	Pereira 54'; Griffiths 66'

5 April 1999
18:05

New Zealand	2 – 5	Pakistan
Radonovich 22'; Hari 38'	Report	Abbas 24', 53', 59'; Sarwar 51'; Bashir 63'

5 April 1999
20:05

Germany	4 – 3	Malaysia
Wein 20'; Michel 25', 55'; Saliger 27'	Report	Anwar 1'; Suhaimi 33'; Kuhan 45'

6 April 1999
18:05

Pakistan	5 – 1	Malaysia
Asim 5'; Shahbaz Jr. 23'; Hussain 37'; Abbas 47', 60'	Report	Kuhan 40'

7 April 1999
17:35

Canada	2 – 1	Germany
Campbell 39'; Griffiths 68'	Report	Saliger 57'

7 April 1999
19:35

South Korea	5 – 1	New Zealand
Woon-kon 37'; Jong-ha 39', 65'; Keon-wook 51'; Min-sik 56'	Report	Buckley 70'

8 April 1999
16:05

Germany	2 – 4	Pakistan
Michel 39', 47'	Report	Abbas 18', 43'; Sarwar 19'; Shahbaz Jr. 69'

8 April 1999
18:05

Malaysia	1 – 3	South Korea
Kuhan 50'	Report	Yong-bae 13'; Woon-kon 23', 58'

8 April 1999
20:05

Canada	2 – 3	New Zealand
Griffiths 8'; Yule 32'	Report	Archibald 19', 65'; Hari 50'

=== Classification round ===
==== Fifth and sixth place ====
10 April 1999
8:00

New Zealand	1 – 2 (a.e.t.)	Malaysia
Archibald 24'	Report	Kuhan 54'; Saiful Azli 85'

==== Third and fourth place ====
10 April 1999
16:05

Germany	3 – 2	Canada
Reinelt 19'; Gemmerig 23'; Michel 39'	Report	Milkovich 30'; Fernandes 53'

=== Final ===
10 April 1999
18:35

Pakistan	3 – 1	South Korea
Abbas 30'; Saqlain 61'; Shahbaz Jr. 67'	Report	Woon-kon 16'

== Statistics ==
=== Final standings ===
Position	Team	Pld	W	D	L	GF	GA	GD	Pts	Result
1st place, gold medalist(s)	Pakistan	6	6	0	0	29	11	+18	18	Champions
2nd place, silver medalist(s)	South Korea	6	3	0	3	19	17	+2	9	Runner-up
3rd place, bronze medalist(s)	Germany	6	4	0	2	17	14	+3	12	Third place
4	Canada	6	2	0	4	13	19	-6	6	
5	Malaysia	6	1	0	5	9	19	-10	2	
6	New Zealand	6	2	0	4	11	18	-7	6	

=== Goalscorers ===
There were 86 goals scored in 18 matches for an average of 4.78 goals per match

12 goals

- (Pakistan) Sohail Abbas

7 goals

- (Germany) Björn Michel

6 goals

- (Malaysia) Kuhan Shanmuganathan
- (Pakistan) Atif Bashir

5 goals

- (Pakistan) Muhammad Shahbaz
- (South Korea) Kang Keon-wook

4 goals

- (New Zealand) Ryan Archibald
- (Malaysia) Yeo Woon-kon
- (Pakistan) Muhammad Sarwar
- (New Zealand) Bevan Hari

3 goals

- (South Korea) Jeon Jong-ha
- (Canada) Andrew Griffiths

2 goals

- (Germany) Stefan Saliger
- (Germany) Christian Wein
- (Germany) Sascha Reinelt
- (South Korea) Song Seung-tae
- (Canada) Ken Pereira
- (Canada) Sean Campbell
- (Canada) Peter Milkovich

1 goal

- (South Korea) Lee Young Hwang
- (South Korea) Lee Jeon-seon
- (New Zealand) John Radonovich
- (Malaysia) Chairil Anwar Abdul Aziz
- (Malaysia) Ibrahim Suhaimi
- (Pakistan) Naveed Asim
- (South Korea) Kim Min-sik
- (New Zealand) Andrew Buckley
- (South Korea) Kim Yong-bae
- (Canada) David Yule
- (Pakistan) Muhammad Saqlain
- (Germany) Frank Gemmerig
- (Canada) Wayne Fernandes
- (Malaysia) Saiful Azli bin Abdul Rahman
- (New Zealand) Bradly Apted
- (Canada) Ian Bird
- (Canada) Paul Wettlaufer
- (Germany) Jan-Peter Tewes
- (South Korea) Kim Kyung-seok
- (Germany) Benjamin Kopp
- (Germany) Tibor Weibenbor
