= 1995 Sultan Azlan Shah Cup =

Field hockey tournament

Tournament details
- Host country: Malaysia
- City: Kuala Lumpur
- Teams: 6
- Venue: Tun Razak Hockey Stadium

Final positions
- Champions: India (3rd title)
- Runner-up: Germany
- Third place: New Zealand

The 1995 Sultan Azlan Shah Cup was the sixth edition of field hockey tournament the Sultan Azlan Shah Cup.

== Participating nations ==
Six countries participated in the tournament:

- New Zealand
- Malaysia
- Canada
- Germany
- Spain
- India

== Final ranking ==
- This ranking does not reflect the actual performance of the team as the ranking issued by the International Hockey Federation. This is just a benchmark ranking in the Sultan Azlan Shah Cup only.

Position	Team
1	India
2	Germany
3	New Zealand
4	Canada
5	Spain
6	Malaysia
