= Azlan Shah Stadium =

Field hockey stadium in Perak, Malaysia

- Sultan Azlan Shah Stadium
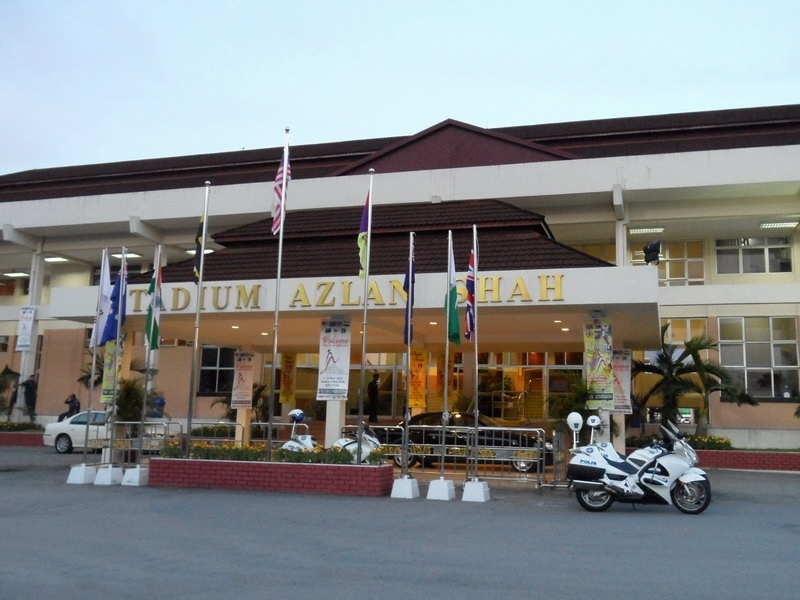
- Interactive map of Azlan Shah Stadium
- Location: Ipoh, Perak, Malaysia
- Coordinates: 4°36′27″N 101°6′0″E
- Capacity: 5,000

Construction
- Built: 1984

Azlan Shah Stadium is a field hockey stadium at Ipoh, Perak, Malaysia. It is the permanent venue of the Sultan Azlan Shah Cup.

== Events ==
- Sultan Azlan Shah Cup
