= 2000 Men's Hockey Champions Trophy =

Tournament details
- Host country: Netherlands
- City: Amstelveen
- Dates: 27 May – 4 June
- Teams: 6
- Venue: Wagener Stadium

Final positions
- Champions: Netherlands (5th title)
- Runner-up: Germany
- Third place: South Korea

Tournament statistics
- Matches played: 18
- Goals scored: 63 (3.5 per match)
- Top scorer(s): (Spain) Eduard Tubau (Germany) Oliver Domke (Netherlands) Stephan Veen (4 goals)
- Best player: (Netherlands) Teun de Nooijer

The 2000 Men's Hockey Champions Trophy was the 22nd edition of the Hockey Champions Trophy men's field hockey tournament. It was held from 27 May – 4 June 2000 in the Wagener Stadium in Amstelveen, Netherlands.

== Squads ==
Australia

Head Coach: Terry Walsh

2. Michael Brennan
4. Jason Duff
5. Troy Elder
6. James Elmer
7. Damon Diletti
8. Lachlan Dreher (GK)
9. Jeremy Hiskins
12. Matthew Smith
13. Jay Stacy
15. Stephen Davies
16. Michael York (c)
17. Craig Victory
21. Stephen Holt
23. Matthew Wells
24. Murray Richards
25. Brent Livermore
26. Dean Butler
32. Bevan George
Germany

Head Coach: Paul Lissek

1. Christopher Reitz (GK)
2. Clemens Arnold (GK)
4. Philipp Crone
5. Eike Duckwitz
6. Christian Wein
7. Björn Michel
8. Sascha Reinelt
9. Oliver Domke
10. Christoph Eimer
11. Björn Emmerling
12. Christoph Bechmann
13. Michael Green
14. Tibor Weißenborn
15. Florian Kunz
16. Christian Mayerhöfer (c)
17. Matthias Witthaus
18. Ulrich Moissl
23. Florian Keller
Great Britain

Head Coach: Barry Dancer

1. Simon Mason (GK)
2. Simon Triggs (GK)
3. Jon Wyatt (c)
4. Bill Waugh
5. Tom Bertram
6. Craig Parnham
7. Guy Fordham
8. Ben Sharpe
9. Mark Pearn
10. Jimmy Wallis
11. Andy Humphrey
12. Duncan Woods
13. Daniel Hall
14. Russell Garcia
15. Calum Giles
16. David Hacker
17. David Mathews
18. Michael Johnson
Netherlands

Head Coach: Maurits Hendriks

1. Ronald Jansen (GK)
4. Erik Jazet
6. Wouter van Pelt
7. Sander van der Weide
8. Jacques Brinkman
9. Piet-Hein Geeris
10. Stephan Veen (c)
12. Jeroen Delmee
13. Guus Vogels (GK)
14. Teun de Nooijer
15. Remco van Wijk
16. Jaap-Derk Buma
17. Peter Windt
18. Marten Eikelboom
19. Paul van Essenveldt
21. Diederik van Weel
24. Taeke Taekema
25. Matthijs Brouwer
South Korea

Head Coach: Kim Sang-ryul

1. Kim Yoon (GK)
2. Ji Seung-hwan
3. Kim Min-shik
4. Kim Chel-hwan
5. Kim Yong-bae
6. Kim Hyung-bae
7. Kim Kyung-seok
8. Kim Jung-chul
9. Song Seung-tae (c)
10. Kang Keon-wook (c)
11. Hwang Jong-hyun
12. Lim Jung-woo
13. Jeon Jong-ha
14. Jeon Hong-kwon
15. Yeo Woon-kon
16. Lim Jong-chun (GK)
17. Seo Jong-ho
18. Han Seong-jin
Spain

Head Coach: Antonio Forrellat

1. Ramón Jufresa (GK)
2. Xavier Ribas
3. Joaquim Malgosa (c)
4. Jaume Amat
5. Francisco Fábregas
9. Pol Amat
10. Jordi Casas
11. Javier Arnau
12. Ramón Sala
13. Juan Dinarés
14. Josep Sánchez
15. Pablo Usoz
16. Bernardino Herrera (GK)
18. Rodrigo Garza
19. Eduard Tubau
23. Jordi Quintana
25. Santi Freixa
26. Albert Sala

== Results ==
All times are Central European Summer Time (UTC+02:00)

=== Pool ===
Team	Pld	W	D	L	GF	GA	GD	Pts
Netherlands	5	5	0	0	10	4	+6	15
Germany	5	3	0	2	14	8	+6	9
Spain	5	2	1	2	8	5	+3	7
South Korea	5	2	0	3	5	7	−2	6
Australia	5	1	2	2	9	11	−2	5
Great Britain	5	0	1	4	6	17	−11	1

27 May 2000
10:00

Spain	2–1	Germany
Sánchez 47'; Tubau 63'	Report	Bechmann 12'

Umpires:
Ray O'Connor (IRL)
Don Prior (AUS)

27 May 2000
12:30

Australia	2–0	South Korea
Victory 8', 20'	Report

Umpires:
Jos Gorissen (NED)
Henrik Ehlers (DEN)

27 May 2000
17:30

Great Britain	1–2	Netherlands
Pearn 70'	Report	De Nooijer 23', 60'

Umpires:
Richard Wolter (GER)
Santiago Deo (ESP)

28 May 2000
12:00

Australia	1–1	Spain
Elder 63'	Report	Tubau 47'

Umpires:
Sumesh Putra (CAN)
Peter von Reth (NED)

29 May 2000
12:10

South Korea	0–1	Netherlands
	Report	Eikelboom 32'

Umpires:
Eric Denis (BEL)
Santiago Deo (ESP)

29 May 2000
14:30

Great Britain	0–4	Germany
	Report	Bechmann 8'; Crone 29'; Weißenborn 38'; Emmerling 55'

Umpires:
Jos Gorissen (NED)
Henrik Ehlers (DEN)

30 May 2000
12:00

Australia	3–3	Great Britain
Elder 6', 22'; Livermore 31'	Report	Fordham 26', 28'; Hall 64'

Umpires:
Ray O'Connor (IRL)
Peter von Reth (NED)

30 May 2000
14:30

Spain	0–1	South Korea
	Report	Hwang Jong-hyun 34'

Umpires:
Richard Wolter (GER)
Henrik Ehlers (DEN)

30 May 2000
17:00

Netherlands	3–2	Germany
Veen 8'; Delmee 43'; Van Wijk 59'	Report	Michel 14'; Bechmann 54'

Umpires:
Eric Denis (BEL)
Sumesh Putra (CAN)

1 June 2000
10:00

Great Britain	1–5	Spain
Mathews 70'	Report	Amat 25'; Dinarés 42'; Tubau 49', 67'; A. Sala 50'

Umpires:
Eric Denis (BEL)
Richard Wolter (GER)

1 June 2000
12:00

Germany	3–1	South Korea
Eimer 22'; Witthaus 30'; Domke 59'	Report	Jeon Jong-ha 61'

Umpires:
Jos Gorissen (NED)
Sumesh Putra (CAN)

1 June 2000
14:30

Netherlands	3–1	Australia
Eikelboom 20'; Veen 45', 52'	Report	Livermore 28'

Umpires:
Santiago Deo (ESP)
Ray O'Connor (IRL)

2 June 2000
14:30

Netherlands	1–0	Spain
Taekema 67'	Report

Umpires:
Henrik Ehlers (DEN)
Ray O'Connor (IRL)

2 June 2000
17:00

Germany	4–2	Australia
Michel 5', 12'; Domke 19', 32'	Report	Stacy 27'; Elmer 30'

Umpires:
Peter von Reth (NED)
Eric Denis (BEL)

2 June 2000
19:30

South Korea	3–1	Great Britain
Kim Kyung-seok 13', 39'; Hwang Jong-hyun 50'	Report	Giles 16'

Umpires:
Santiago Deo (ESP)
Jos Gorissen (NED)

=== Classification ===
==== Fifth and sixth place ====
4 June 2000
10:00

Australia	3–2	Great Britain
Hiskins 17', 19'; Smith 37'	Report	Giles 29', 41'

Umpires:
Richard Wolter (GER)
Sumesh Putra (CAN)

==== Third and fourth place ====
4 June 2000
12:30

Spain	0–3	South Korea
	Report	Yeo Woon-kon 22'; Jeon Jong-ha 30'; Song Seung-tae 51'

Umpires:
Peter von Reth (NED)
Henrik Ehlers (DEN)

==== Final ====
4 June 2000
15:00

Netherlands	2–1 (a.e.t.)	Germany
Eikelboom 11'; Veen 81'	Report	Domke 54'

Umpires:
Santiago Deo (ESP)
Ray O'Connor (IRL)

== Awards ==
Top Scorers	Best Player	Best Young Player	Fair Play Award
(Germany) Oliver Domke (Spain) Eduardo Tubau (Netherlands) Stephan Veen	(Netherlands) Teun de Nooijer	(Spain) Eduardo Tubau	Spain

== Final standings ==
1. Netherlands
2. Germany
3. South Korea
4. Spain
5. Australia
6. Great Britain
