= 1999 Men's Hockey Champions Trophy =

Sports event

Tournament details
- Host country: Australia
- City: Brisbane
- Dates: 10–20 June
- Teams: 6
- Venue: State Hockey Centre

Final positions
- Champions: Australia (7th title)
- Runner-up: South Korea
- Third place: Netherlands

Tournament statistics
- Matches played: 18
- Goals scored: 69 (3.83 per match)
- Top scorer: (South Korea) Song Seung-tae (7 goals)
- Best player: (South Korea) Song Seung-tae

The 1999 Men's Hockey Champions Trophy was the 21st edition of the Hockey Champions Trophy men's field hockey tournament. It took place from 10–20 June 1999 in the State Hockey Centre in Brisbane, Australia. It was the third time in the history of the annual six nations tournament that the event was combined with the Women's Champions Trophy.

== Squads ==
Australia

Head Coach: Terry Walsh

2. Michael Brennan
3. Adam Commens
4. Jason Duff
5. Troy Elder
6. James Elmer
7. Damon Diletti (GK)
8. Lachlan Dreher (GK)
10. Paul Gaudoin
13. Jay Stacy
14. Daniel Sproule
15. Stephen Davies
16. Michael York (C)
17. Craig Victory
18. Lachlan Vivian-Taylor
20. Scott Webster
21. Stephen Holt
23. Matthew Wells
25. Brent Livermore
England

Head Coach: Barry Dancer

1. Simon Mason (GK)
2. David Luckes (GK)
3. Jon Wyatt
4. Julian Halls
5. Bill Waugh (C)
6. Andy Humphrey
8. Ben Sharpe
9. Robert Crutchley
10. Jimmy Wallis
11. Brett Garrard
13. Danny Hall
14. Stuart Head
16. Mark Pearn
17. Russell Garcia
18. Michael Johnson
21. Duncan Woods
25. Tom Bertram
26. Calum Giles
Netherlands

Head Coach: Maurits Hendriks

2. Bram Lomans
3. Marnix van Rijn
4. Erik Jazet
5. Tycho van Meer
7. Sander van der Weide
8. Jacques Brinkman
9. Piet-Hein Geeris
10. Stephan Veen (C)
11. Sander van Heeswijk
12. Jeroen Delmee
13. Guus Vogels (GK)
14. Teun de Nooijer
15. Remco van Wijk
16. Jaap-Derk Buma
17. Peter Windt
18. Marten Eikelboom
21. Diederik van Weel
23. Josef Kramer (GK)
Pakistan

Head Coach: Shahnaz Sheikh

1. Atif Bashir (C)
2. Irfan Yousaf
3. Haider Hussain
4. Sohail Abbas
5. Waseem Ahmed
6. Mohammad Nadeem
7. Mohammad Qasim (GK)
8. Muhammad Sarwar
9. Muhammad Shahbaz
10. Mohammad Irfan
11. Naveed Asim
12. Amir Saleem
13. Muhammad Saqlain
14. Muhammad Usman
15. Ahmad Alam (GK)
16. Danish Kaleem
17. Imran Yousaf
18. Kashif Jawad
South Korea

Head Coach: Kim Sang-ryul

1. Lim Jong-chun (GK)
2. Kim Yong-bae
3. Ji Seong-hwan
4. Han Hyung-bae
5. Seo Jong-ho
6. Seo Jong-ha
7. Kim Kyung-seok
8. Kim Jung-chul
9. Song Seung-tae
10. Kang Keon-wook (C)
11. Lee Jung-soon
12. Lim Jung-woo
13. Kim Min-sik
14. Hwang Jong-hyun
15. Yeo Woon-kon
16. Lee Myung-ho (GK)
17. Im Bong-hyuk
18. Kim Seong-min
Spain

Head Coach: Antonio Forrellat

1. Joaquín Sánchez (GK)
2. Joaquim Malgosa (C)
5. Francisco Fábregas
6. Jorge Arnau
7. Juan Escarré
9. Pol Amat
10. Jordi Casas
11. Javier Arnau
12. Ramón Sala
14. Josep Sánchez
15. Pablo Usoz
16. Bernardino Herrera (GK)
18. Rodrigo Garza
19. Santiago Ferran
22. Eduard Tubau
23. Jordi Quintana
24. Miguel Codina
25. Antonio Iglesias

== Results ==
All times are Australian Eastern Standard Time (UTC+10:00)

=== Pool ===
Team	Pld	W	D	L	GF	GA	GD	Pts
Australia	5	3	1	1	9	5	+4	10
South Korea	5	2	2	1	12	11	+1	8
Netherlands	5	2	1	2	10	7	+3	7
Spain	5	2	1	2	8	7	+1	7
Pakistan	5	1	3	1	7	8	−1	6
England	5	1	0	4	5	13	−8	3

10 June 1999
13:05

England	2–3	South Korea
Pearn 31'; Giles 70'	Report	Song 3', 57', 64'

Umpires:
Santiago Deo (ESP)
Christian Siebrecht (GER)

10 June 1999
17:05

Spain	1–1	Pakistan
Iglesias 57'	Report	Sarwar 40'

Umpires:
Murray Grime (AUS)
Ray O'Connor (IRL)

11 June 1999
13:05

South Korea	3–2	Netherlands
Kang 10'; Hwang 33'; Song 56'	Report	Lomans 22'; De Nooijer 24'

Umpires:
David Gentles (AUS)
Garth Proudfoot (RSA)

11 June 1999
19:45

England	1–3	Australia
Crutchley 62'	Report	Davies 6', 10'; Victory 18'

Umpires:
Han Jin-soo (KOR)
Philip Schellekens (NED)

12 June 1999
13:05

Pakistan	2–2	Netherlands
Bashir 26'; Sarwar 39'	Report	Van Wijk 23'; Eikelboom 68'

Umpires:
Hamish Jamson (ENG)
Christian Siebrecht (GER)

13 June 1999
11:05

Australia	2–0	Spain
Victory 32'; Elder 36'	Report

Umpires:
Han Jin-soo (KOR)
Ray O'Connor (IRL)

13 June 1999
13:05

South Korea	2–2	Pakistan
Yeo 21'; Kang 60'	Report	Abbas 5'; Hussain 25'

Umpires:
Santiago Deo (ESP)
Murray Grime (AUS)

14 June 1999
11:05

England	0–3	Spain
	Report	Escarré 23', 45'; Tubau 65'

Umpires:
David Gentles (AUS)
Philip Schellekens (NED)

14 June 1999
13:05

Netherlands	1–2	Australia
Brinkman 32'	Report	Elder 13'; Davies 34'

Umpires:
Hamish Jamson (ENG)
Christian Siebrecht (GER)

16 June 1999
15:05

Australia	1–1	South Korea
Brennan 57'	Report	Kang 59'

Umpires:
Santiago Deo (ESP)
Hamish Jamson (ENG)

16 June 1999
18:05

Pakistan	0–2	England
	Report	Wyatt 30'; Wallis 42'

Umpires:
Han Jin-soo (KOR)
Garth Proudfoot (RSA)

16 June 1999
20:05

Spain	0–1	Netherlands
	Report	De Nooijer 45'

Umpires:
Ray O'Connor (IRL)
Murray Grime (AUS)

18 June 1999
15:05

Spain	4–3	South Korea
Casas 13'; Iglesias 24'; Amat 27'; Escarré 62'	Report	Song 6', 24'; Jeon 25'

18 June 1999
18:05

Pakistan	2–1	Australia
Abbas 16'; Sarwar 56'	Report	Elder 8'

18 June 1999
20:05

Netherlands	4–0	England
Eikelboom 53', 67'; Geeris 57'; De Nooijer 69'	Report

Umpires:
Christian Siebrecht (GER)
Han Jin-soo (KOR)

=== Classification ===
==== Fifth and sixth place ====
20 June 1999
10:05

England	4–3 (a.e.t.)	Pakistan
Wallis 24', 79'; Pearn 39'; Crutchley 47'	Report	Bashir 16'; Abbas 21', 49'

Umpires:
Ray O'Connor (IRL)
Han Jin-soo (KOR)

==== Third and fourth place ====
20 June 1999
12:35

Netherlands	5–2	Spain
Veen 22', 30'; Van Wijk 35', 66'; Eikelboom 50'	Report	Arnau 17', 50'

Umpires:
Murray Grime (AUS)
Hamish Jamson (ENG)

==== Final ====
20 June 1999
15:05

Australia	3–1	South Korea
Davies 23', 52'; Elder 33'	Report	Song 62'

Umpires:
Santiago Deo (ESP)
Christian Siebrecht (GER)

== Awards ==
Topscorer	Best Player of the Tournament
Song Seung-tae (KOR)	Song Seung-tae (KOR)

== Final standings ==
1. Australia
2. South Korea
3. Netherlands
4. Spain
5. England
6. Pakistan
