= 1997 Men's Hockey Champions Trophy =

International hockey tournament

2007 Men's Hockey Champions Trophy
Tournament details
- Host country: Australia
- City: Adelaide
- Dates: 11–19 October
- Teams: 6
- Venue: Pines Hockey Stadium

Final positions
- Champions: Germany (7th title)
- Runner-up: Australia
- Third place: Spain

Tournament statistics
- Matches played: 18
- Goals scored: 90 (5 per match)
- Top scorer: (Spain) Javier Arnau (8 goals)
- Best player: (Australia) David Wansbrough

The 1997 Men's Hockey Champions Trophy was the 19th edition of the Hockey Champions Trophy men's field hockey tournament. It was held from 11–19 October 1997 in the Pines Hockey Stadium in Adelaide, Australia.

== Results ==
All times are Australia Central Standard Time (UTC+09:30)

=== Pool ===
Team	Pld	W	D	L	GF	GA	GD	Pts
Australia	5	5	0	0	19	5	+14	15
Germany	5	3	1	1	12	8	+4	10
Spain	5	2	1	2	14	11	+3	7
Netherlands	5	2	1	2	13	13	0	7
South Korea	5	1	0	4	8	19	−11	3
Pakistan	5	0	1	4	8	18	−10	1

11 October 1997

Netherlands	3–1	South Korea
Brinkman 40'; Lomans 51', 63'	Report	Song Seung-tae 45'

Umpires:
Santiago Deo (ESP)
Donald Prior (AUS)

11 October 1997

Australia	3–0	Spain
Elmer 5', 33'; Choppy 44'	Report

Umpires:
Henrik Ehlers (DEN)
Eduardo Ruiz (ARG)

11 October 1997

Pakistan	1–4	Germany
Ahmed 25'	Report	Bechmann 14', 50'; Blunck 21', 39'

Umpires:
Peter von Reth (NED)
Sumesh Putra (CAN)

12 October 1997

Spain	6–2	South Korea
Ja. Arnau 40', 54', 70'; Escarré 43', 66'; Dinares 59'	Report	Kim Young-kyu 3'; Shin Seok-kyo 49'

Umpires:
Peter von Reth (NED)
Murray Grime (AUS)

12 October 1997

Netherlands	2–2	Germany
Veen 2'; Van Wijk 8'	Report	Mayerhöfer 51'; Tewes 70'

Umpires:
Eduardo Ruiz (ARG)
Donald Prior (AUS)

12 October 1997

Australia	5–3	Pakistan
Davies 22', 36'; Choppy 40'; Hiskins 47'; Brennan 63'	Report	Khan 9'; Zaman 47'; Kaleem 52'

Umpires:
Santiago Deo (ESP)
Klaus Peltzer (GER)

14 October 1997

Pakistan	1–3	South Korea
Sarwar 46'	Report	Kang Keon-wook 29', 64'; Yeo Woon-kon 66'

Umpires:
Ravi Irugalbandara (SRI)
Donald Prior (AUS)

14 October 1997

Australia	2–0	Germany
Davies 17'; Elmer 51'	Report

Umpires:
Henrik Ehlers (DEN)
Peter von Reth (NED)

15 October 1997

Netherlands	2–5	Spain
De Nooijer 31', 33'	Report	Sánchez 8'; Ja. Arnau 10', 35'; Amat 65'; Escarré 66'

Umpires:
Klaus Peltzer (GER)
Eduardo Ruiz (ARG)

15 October 1997

Germany	3–1	South Korea
Bechmann 8'; Bellenbaum 18'; Domke 22'	Report	Song Seung-tae 5'

Umpires:
Sumesh Putra (CAN)
Murray Grime (AUS)

16 October 1997

Spain	1–1	Pakistan
Ja. Arnau 25'	Report	Kaleem 70'

Umpires:
Henrik Ehlers (DEN)
Murray Grime (AUS)

16 October 1997

Netherlands	1–3	Australia
Lomans 35'	Report	Davies 8'; Gaudoin 26'; Hiskins 52'

Umpires:
Sumesh Putra (CAN)
Santiago Deo (ESP)

18 October 1997

Germany	3–2	Spain
Blunck 8'; Eimer 39'; Domke 51'	Report	Ja. Arnau 19'; Pujol 52'

Umpires:
Donald Prior (AUS)
Peter von Reth (NED)

18 October 1997

Netherlands	5–2	Pakistan
Van Wijk 1'; De Nooijer 22', 30', 52'; Veen 25'	Report	Ashraf 18', 47'

Umpires:
Klaus Peltzer (GER)
Santiago Deo (ESP)

18 October 1997

Australia	6–1	South Korea
Stacy 14'; Elmer 15'; Hiskins 54', 69'; Davies 58', 62'	Report	Yoo Moon-ki 64'

Umpires:
Ravi Irugalbandara (SRI)
Eduardo Ruiz (ARG)

=== Classification ===
==== Fifth and sixth place ====
19 October 1997

Pakistan	6–2	South Korea
Zaman 16'; Ashraf 19'; Babar 20'; Sarwar 24', 27'; Kaleem 70'	Report	Kang Keon-wook 21'; Song Seung-tae 30'

Umpires:
Klaus Peltzer (GER)
Sumesh Putra (CAN)

==== Third and fourth place ====
19 October 1997

Netherlands	1–2	Spain
Lomans 32'	Report	Pujol 10'; Ja. Arnau 64'

Umpires:
Donald Prior (AUS)
Eduardo Ruiz (ARG)

==== Final ====
19 October 1997

Germany	3–2 (a.e.t.)	Australia
Bechmann 7', 37', 74'	Report	Sproule 31'; Davies 52'

Umpires:
Santiago Deo (ESP)
Peter von Reth (NED)

== Final standings ==
1. Germany
2. Australia
3. Spain
4. Netherlands
5. Pakistan
6. South Korea
