= Michael Green (field hockey) =

German field hockey player

Personal information
- Born: 5 May 1972 (age 54) Braunschweig, West Germany

Sport
- Sport: Field hockey
- Position: Defender
Senior career
Years	Team	Caps	Goals
–	MTV Braunschweig	-	-
–	Braunschweiger THC	-	-
–	Harvestehude	-	-
Medal record
Men's field hockey
Representing Germany
World Cup
Gold medal – first place	2002 Utrecht
Bronze medal – third place	1998 Kuala Lumpur
EuroHockey Championship
Gold medal – first place	1995 Dublin
Gold medal – first place	1999 Padova
Gold medal – first place	2003 Barcelona
Champions Trophy
Gold medal – first place	1995 Berlin
Gold medal – first place	1997 Adelaide
Gold medal – first place	2001 Rotterdam
Silver medal – second place	1993 Kuala Lumpur
Silver medal – second place	1994 Lahore
Silver medal – second place	2000 Amstelveen
Bronze medal – third place	1996 Madras

Michael Green (born 5 May 1972 in Braunschweig, Lower Saxony) is a former field hockey player from Germany. He began his career at MTV Braunschweig and Braunschweiger THC and later played for Harvestehuder THC in Hamburg. The defender competed at two Summer Olympics. Green is working as a surgeon, and played more than 260 international matches for the German field hockey squad.

== List of Honours ==
- 1992 – Best Player at the 1992 Junior European Championship
- 1996 – Best Player in the German National League
- 1996 – Sportsman of Hamburg
- 1999 – Best Player in the German National League
- 2002 – FIH Player of the Year

== International senior tournaments ==
- 1993 – Champions Trophy, Kuala Lumpur (2nd place)
- 1994 – Champions Trophy, Lahore (2nd place)
- 1994 – World Cup, Sydney (4th place)
- 1995 – European Nations Cup, Dublin (1st place)
- 1995 – Champions Trophy, Berlin (1st place)
- 1996 – 1996 Summer Olympics, Atlanta (4th place)
- 1996 – Champions Trophy, Madras (3rd place)
- 1997 – Champions Trophy, Adelaide (1st place)
- 1998 – World Cup, Utrecht (3rd place)
- 1998 – Champions Trophy, Lahore (6th place)
- 1999 – European Nations Cup, Padova (1st place)
- 2000 – Champions Trophy, Amstelveen (2nd place)
- 2000 – 2000 Summer Olympics, Sydney (5th place)
- 2001 – European Indoor Nations Cup, Luzern (1st place)
- 2001 – Champions Trophy, Rotterdam (1st place)
- 2002 – World Cup, Kuala Lumpur (1st place)
- 2003 – European Nations Cup, Barcelona (1st place)

Awards
Preceded by (Germany) Florian Kunz	WorldHockey Player of the Year; 2002	Succeeded by (Netherlands) Teun de Nooijer
