= Juan Dinarés =

Spanish field hockey player (born 1969)

Personal information
- Full name: Juan Antonio Dinarés Quera
- Born: 23 September 1969 (age 56) Terrassa, Spain

Sport
- Sport: Field hockey
- Position: Midfielder
Senior career
Years	Team	Caps	Goals
–	Club Egara	-	-
National team
Years	Team	Caps	Goals
–	Spain		-
Medal record
Men's field hockey
Representing Spain
Olympic Games
Silver medal – second place	1996 Atlanta	Team
World Cup
Silver medal – second place	1998 Utrecht	Team
Champions Trophy
Bronze medal – third place	1997 Adelaide	Team

Juan Antonio Dinarés Quera (born 23 September 1969 in Terrassa, Catalonia) is a former field hockey midfielder from Spain, who won the silver medal with the men's national team at the 1996 Summer Olympics in Atlanta, Georgia.
