= 1998 World Cup (disambiguation) =

The 1998 FIFA World Cup was the 16th edition of the FIFA international association football tournament.

1998 World Cup may also refer to:

- 1998 IAAF World Cup
- 1998 Men's Hockey World Cup
- 1998 Women's Hockey World Cup
- 1998 Alpine Skiing World Cup
