= Teun de Nooijer =

Dutch field hockey player

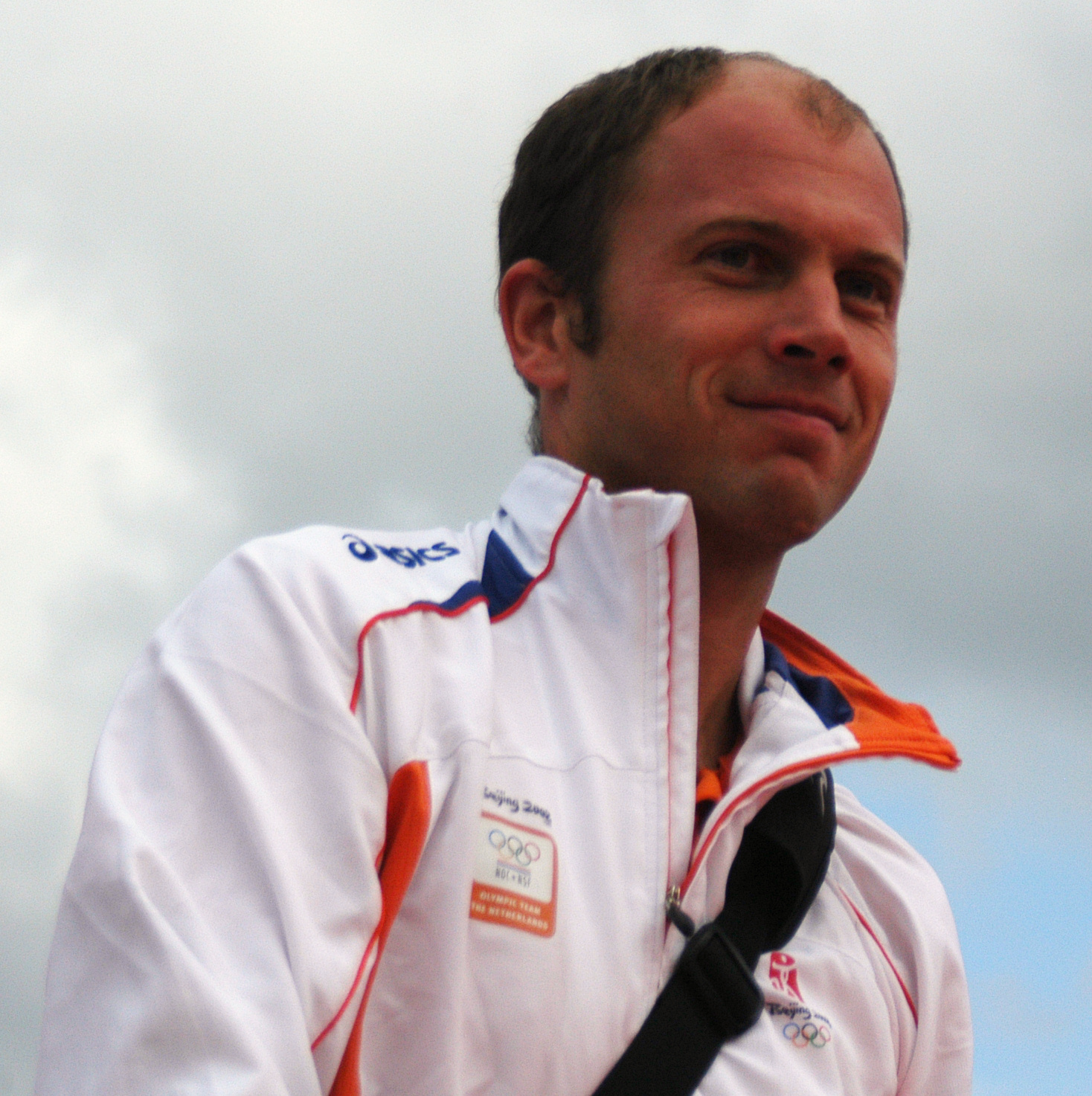
- Teun de Nooijer in 2008.

Medal record

Men's field hockey

Representing the Netherlands

Olympic Games
| Gold medal – first place | 1996 Atlanta | Team |
| Gold medal – first place | 2000 Sydney | Team |
| Silver medal – second place | 2004 Athens | Team |
| Silver medal – second place | 2012 London | Team |

World Cup
| Gold medal – first place | 1998 Utrecht | Team |
| Bronze medal – third place | 2002 Kuala Lumpur | Team |
| Bronze medal – third place | 2010 Delhi | Team |

European Championship
| Gold medal – first place | 2007 Manchester | Team |
| Silver medal – second place | 1999 Padova | Team |
| Silver medal – second place | 2005 Leipzig | Team |
| Silver medal – second place | 2011 Gladbach | Team |
| Bronze medal – third place | 2009 Amstelveen | Team |

Champions Trophy
| Gold medal – first place | 1996 Madras | Team |
| Gold medal – first place | 1998 Lahore | Team |
| Gold medal – first place | 2000 Amstelveen | Team |
| Gold medal – first place | 2002 Cologne | Team |
| Gold medal – first place | 2003 Amstelveen | Team |
| Gold medal – first place | 2006 Terrassa | Team |
| Silver medal – second place | 2004 Lahore | Team |
| Silver medal – second place | 2005 Chennai | Team |
| Bronze medal – third place | 1999 Brisbane | Team |
| Bronze medal – third place | 2007 Kuala Lumpur | Team |
| Bronze medal – third place | 2011 Auckland | Team |

Teun Floris de Nooijer (born 22 March 1976) is a field hockey player from the Netherlands, who twice became Olympic champion with the Dutch national squad, in 1996 and in 2000, and was on the team in 2012. He currently plays for Dutch side HC Bloemendaal and in Hockey India League for Uttar Pradesh Wizards.

== Career ==
=== Dutch Hockey Sides (1994-Present) ===
Born in Egmond aan den Hoef, he made his debut on 4 June 1994 in a friendly match against New Zealand. Since then the midfielder played over three hundred international matches for the Dutch. On 4 April 2007 he earned his 350th cap for the Netherlands national field hockey team, when the team defeated Belgium (7–3) in a friendly in Boxtel, North Brabant.

De Nooijer started playing hockey at the age of nine, with his brothers in the backyard of their house. He joined HC Alkmaar at the age of eleven, and was selected for the Dutch under-16 team 2 years later. At fifteen, De Nooijer made his debut in the senior men's league with HC Alkmaar, and two years later, he first played in the Netherlands' elite league with HC Bloemendaal. After two seasons wearing the number 11 shirt, De Nooijer switched to the number 14, made famous by Johan Cruijff, and has worn it for club and country ever since. The number was later bestowed on the signature stick he helped to create, the Dita Giga #14

De Nooijer played for Alkmaar before moving to HC Bloemendaal. After the 1998 Hockey World Cup he played for a couple of months in Germany, at Harvestehuder THC. In the final of the 1998 Hockey World Cup in Utrecht he scored the golden goal in the final against Spain. De Nooijer was named World Hockey Player of the Year in 2003, 2005 and 2006 by the International Hockey Federation (FIH). De Nooijer created history when he won the award, which was presented by Jacques Rogge for a record third time. Jamie Dwyer, however, equaled this record when he won the award for the third time in 2009, and surpassed it when he won the award again in 2010. The only other man to have won the award more than once is de Nooijer's former teammate Stephan Veen (1998, 2000).

Earlier in 2006, de Nooijer was the decisive factor in the Champions Trophy final as the Netherlands claimed a record-equalling eighth crown and de Nooijer's sixth.

He claimed his 400th cap for the Netherlands on 15 August 2009 against the 5–3 victory against India

=== Uttar Pradesh Wizards (2012-Present) ===
De Nooijer become the Highest Paid Player for Hockey India League, When he was signed by UP Wizards. Since then he was playing for them.

== Personal life ==
De Nooijer is married to Philippa Suxdorf, herself a former German international hockey player with 154 caps under her belt. They have 3 daughters, seven-year-old Philine, five-year-old Lilly, and two-year-old Nana.

== Coaching career ==
He currently is the coach of the women's team of HC Bloemendaal.

Awards
| Preceded by (Germany) Michael Green | WorldHockey Player of the Year; 2003 | Succeeded by (Australia) Jamie Dwyer |
| Preceded by (Australia) Jamie Dwyer | WorldHockey Player of the Year; 2005 and 2006 | Succeeded by (Australia) Jamie Dwyer |
