= Calum Giles =

British field hockey player

Personal information
- Born: 27 October 1972 (age 53) Portsmouth, England
- Height: 182 cm (6 ft 0 in)
- Weight: 78 kg (172 lb)

Sport
- Sport: Field hockey
- Position: Forward
Senior career
Years	Team	Caps	Goals
1991–1996	Havant	-	-
1996–1998	HC Klein Zwitserland	-	-
1998–1999	Southgate	-	-
1999–2000	Surbiton	-	-
2000–2005	Oxted	-	-
2006–2008	Havant	-	-
National team
Years	Team	Caps	Goals
–	GB & England	143	(110)
Medal record
Men's field hockey
Representing England
Commonwealth Games
Bronze medal – third place	1998 Kuala Lumpur	Team
European Championship
Bronze medal – third place	1995 Dublin	Team
Bronze medal – third place	1999 Padua	Team

Calum Giles (born 27 October 1972) is a former Great Britain Olympic field hockey player, who competed at the 1996 Summer Olympics in Atlanta, and the 2000 Summer Olympics in Sydney. His scoring success was primarily due to his expertise at executing the Penalty corner.

== Biography ==
Giles started his hockey career at the age of five playing for OPCS in Portsmouth.

He made his national league debut at the age of 18 playing club hockey for Havant in the Men's England Hockey League in 1991. During his time at Havant he also coached at Worthing Hockey Club, made his International debut at the age of 23 playing for England in 1995 and represented Great Britain at the 1996 Olympic Games in Atlanta. At the 1995 European Cup Giles became the first English player to win a top goal scorer award in a major competition.

After the Olympics, Giles moved to play his hockey in the Netherlands for HC Klein Zwitserland, participating in the 1998 Men's Hockey World Cup before returning to England to join Southgate for the 1998/99 season.

He left Southgate to join Surbiton for the 1999/2000 season and while at Surbiton, he represented Great Britain at the 2000 Olympic Games in Sydney.

He retired from international hockey in 2000 after collecting 143 caps for England and Great Britain and scoring 110 international goals. He was England and Great Britain's highest goalscorer for over 14 years.

After retiring from International hockey he pursued a coaching career and became a full-time player-coach to Oxted. After several years he gained the club promotion to the National League for the first time in their history. Following his time at Oxted he re-joined his childhood club Havant as player-coach where he in two years he managed to take them back to the pinnacle of English hockey for the 2007/2008 season, managing to end the season 4th in the Men's Premier Division.

Following one season at Plymouth Marjon he became Director of hockey at Teddington Hockey Club, promoting the men's first team back to National league status in his first season.

In 2014, he took on the role of Professional Hockey Coach at Eltham College. He was head of hockey at the school and ran his highly successful Stickwise hockey camps there. In the summer of 2015, Giles was appointed Head Coach of Blackheath & Old Elthamians Hockey Club. In his first season, he successfully led this team to promotion to the South Premier League and to the final of the England Hockey Trophy. Blackheath & Old Elthamians won the trophy the following season.

In 2023, he became a coach at Worth School in Crawley, where he runs the Stickwise camps.

== International achievements ==
- 1995 – European, Dublin
- 1995 – Champions Trophy, Berlin
- 1996 – Olympic Qualifier, Barcelona
- 1996 – Olympic Games, Atlanta
- 1998 – World Cup, Utrecht
- 1999 – Champions Trophy, Brisbane
- 1999 – European Cup, Padua
- 2000 – Olympic Qualifier, Osaka
- 2000 – Champions Trophy, Amsterdam
- 2000 – Olympic Games, Sydney
