= Christoph Bechmann =

German field hockey player

Personal information
- Born: 23 November 1971 (age 54) Speyer, West Germany

Sport
- Sport: Field hockey
Senior career
Years	Team	Caps	Goals
1975–1985	Speyer	-	-
1985–1992	Frankenthal	-	-
1992–1994	Dürkheim	-	-
1994–1999	Gladbach	-	-
1999–2000	Harvestehude	-	-
2002–2005	Club an der Alster	-	-
National team
Years	Team	Caps	Goals
1995–2004	Germany	124	-
Medal record
Men's field hockey
Representing Germany
Olympic Games
Bronze medal – third place	2004 Athens	Team
World Cup
Gold medal – first place	2002 Kuala Lumpur	Team
Bronze medal – third place	1998 Utrecht	Team
Champions Trophy
Gold medal – first place	1995 Berlin	Team
Gold medal – first place	1997 Adelaide	Team
Silver medal – second place	2000 Amstelveen	Team
Silver medal – second place	2002 Cologne	Team
Bronze medal – third place	1996 Madras	Team

Christoph Bechmann (born 23 November 1971 in Speyer am Rhein, Rheinland-Pfalz) is a field hockey player from Germany, who was a member of the Men's National Team that won the bronze medal at the 2004 Summer Olympics in Athens, Greece.

The striker from Club an der Alster (Hamburg), whose nicknamed Duffi or Bechi, played in three Summer Olympics, starting in 1996. He has captained the German National Team and was a member of the Team of the Year in Mönchengladbach, Germany.

== International senior tournaments ==
He played from 1994 until 2004, 124 matches for the Germany national team in outdoor competitions.

- 1994 – 8th World Cup, Sydney (4th place)
- 1995 – European Nations Cup, Dublin (1st place)
- 1995 – Champions Trophy, Berlin (1st place)
- 1996 – Summer Olympics, Atlanta (4th place)
- 1996 – Champions Trophy, Madras (3rd place)
- 1997 – European Indoor Nations Cup, Lievin (1st place)
- 1997 – Champions Trophy, Adelaide (1st place)
- 1998 – 9th World Cup, Utrecht (3rd place)
- 1999 – European Indoor Nations Cup, Slagelse (1st place)
- 1999 – European Nations Cup, Padua (1st place)
- 2000 – Champions Trophy, Amstelveen (2nd place)
- 2000 – Summer Olympics, Sydney (5th place)
- 2002 – 10th World Cup, Kuala Lumpur (1st place)
- 2002 – Champions Trophy, Cologne (2nd place)
- 2003 – European Nations Cup, Barcelona (1st place)
- 2004 – Summer Olympics, Athens (3rd place)
- 2005 – World Games, Duisburg (1st place)
- 2006 – European Indoor Nations Cup, Eindhoven (1st place)
