= Sander van der Weide =

Dutch field hockey player (born 1976)

Medal record

Men's field hockey

Representing the Netherlands

Olympic Games
Gold medal – first place	2000 Sydney	Team
Silver medal – second place	2004 Athens	Team

World Cup
Gold medal – first place	1998 Utrecht	Team

European Championship
Silver medal – second place	2005 Leipzig	Team

Champions Trophy
Gold medal – first place	2000 Amstelveen	Team
Gold medal – first place	2002 Cologne	Team
Gold medal – first place	2003 Amstelveen	Team
Gold medal – first place	2006 Terrassa	Team
Silver medal – second place	2004 Lahore	Team
Silver medal – second place	2005 Chennai	Team
Bronze medal – third place	1999 Brisbane	Team

Sander Petrus Henricus van der Weide (born 21 June 1976 in Boxtel, North Brabant) is a field hockey player from the Netherlands, who was a member of the Dutch team that won the golden medal at the 2000 Summer Olympics in Sydney.

The defender made his debut on 13 November 1996 in a friendly against Germany in Eindhoven. He played in the Dutch League for HC Den Bosch and Amsterdam, before moving to Spain in the summer of 2004, just after the 2004 Summer Olympics in Athens, where he won the silver medal with the national squad. Since then Van der Weide played for Real Club de Polo in Barcelona.

His cousin Jeroen Delmee was the captain of the Dutch national side since 2000.

Sander lives and works in Barcelona with his wife and two kids. Here he started his own business in hockey events, The Hockey Department.
