= Marten Eikelboom =

Dutch field hockey player (born 1973)

Personal information
- Born: 12 October 1973 (age 52) Zwolle, Netherlands

Sport
- Sport: Field hockey
- Position: Forward
Senior career
Years	Team	Caps	Goals
–	Hattem	-	-
1994–2004	Amsterdam	-	-
National team
Years	Team	Caps	Goals
1994–2004	Netherlands	177	(58)
Medal record
Men's field hockey
Representing the Netherlands
Olympic Games
Gold medal – first place	2000 Sydney	Team
Silver medal – second place	2004 Athens	Team
World Cup
Silver medal – second place	1994 Sydney	Team
Bronze medal – third place	2002 Kuala Lumpur	Team
EuroHockey Championship
Silver medal – second place	1995 Dublin	Team
Silver medal – second place	1999 Padova	Team
Champions Trophy
Gold medal – first place	1996 Madras	Team
Gold medal – first place	1998 Lahore	Team
Gold medal – first place	2000 Amstelveen	Team
Bronze medal – third place	1999 Brisbane	Team
Bronze medal – third place	2001 Rotterdam	Team

Marten Eikelboom (born 12 October 1973, in Zwolle) is a field hockey striker from the Netherlands, who was a member of the Dutch team that won the gold medal at the 2000 Summer Olympics in Sydney. After the World Hockey Cup in Kuala Lumpur (2002), he retired from the national squad, but in 2004 he made a comeback, just because of the 2004 Summer Olympics in Athens, where he finished second.

Eikelboom played 177 international matches for the Dutch, scoring a total of 58 goals. He made his debut on 5 June 1994 in a friendly against New Zealand. In the Dutch League he played for Hattem and Amsterdam, with whom he won the title four times.

Awards
Preceded by Raymond Joval	Amsterdam Sportsman of the Year; 2000	Succeeded by Rafael van der Vaart
