= Erik Jazet =

Dutch field hockey player (born 1971)

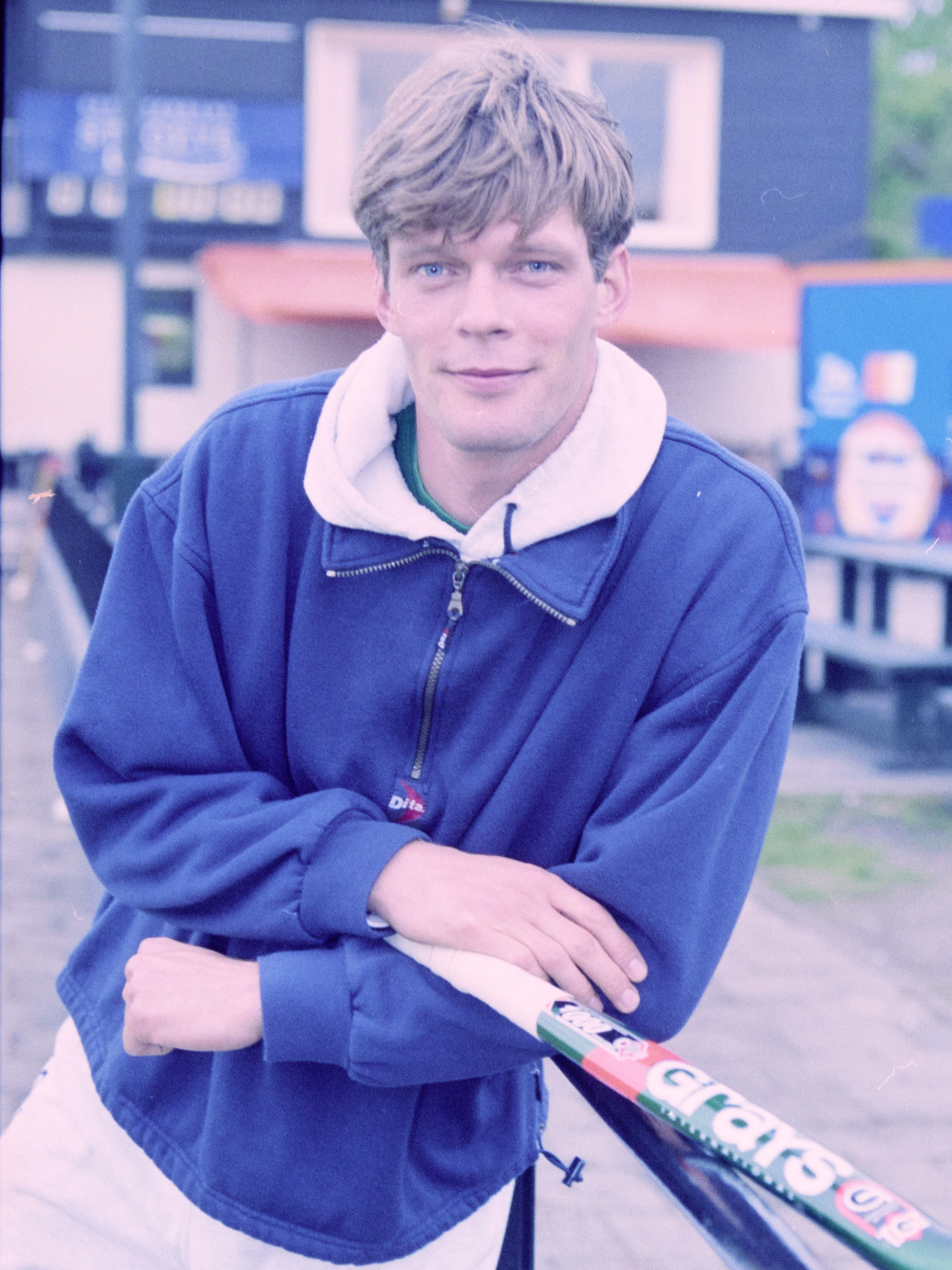

Medal record

Men's field hockey

Representing the Netherlands

Olympic Games
Gold medal – first place	1996 Atlanta	Team
Gold medal – first place	2000 Sydney	Team
Silver medal – second place	2004 Athens	Team

World Cup
Gold medal – first place	1998 Utrecht	Team

Champions Trophy
Gold medal – first place	2000 Amstelveen	Team
Gold medal – first place	2002 Cologne	Team
Gold medal – first place	2003 Amstelveen	Team
Bronze medal – third place	1999 Brisbane	Team

Erik Alexander Jazet (born 19 July 1971 in Schiedam) is a former Dutch field hockey player, who played 308 international matches for the Netherlands. The defender made his debut for the Dutch on 17 November 1990 in a match against England.

He competed at three Olympic Games, and won two golden medals (1996 and 2000) and a bronze (2004. In the Dutch League Jazet played for HC Bloemendaal and Stichtse Cricket en Hockey Club. He became the first team coach for Bloemendaal women in 2005.
