= Christoph Eimer =

German field hockey player

Personal information
- Born: 12 March 1977 (age 49) Neuss, West Germany

Sport
- Sport: Field hockey
Senior career
Years	Team	Caps	Goals
–1995	Schwarz-Weiß Neuss	-	-
1995–1997	Crefeld	-	-
1997–2003	Münchner SC	-	-
–	HC Roma	-	-
–	Düsseldorf	-	-
National team
Years	Team	Caps	Goals
1997–2004	Germany	49	-
Medal record
Men's field hockey
Representing Germany
Olympic Games
Bronze medal – third place	2004 Athens	Team
World Cup
Gold medal – first place	2002 Kuala Lumpur	Team
Bronze medal – third place	1998 Utrecht	Team
Champions Trophy
Gold medal – first place	1997 Adelaide	Team
Gold medal – first place	2001 Rotterdam	Team
Silver medal – second place	2000 Amstelveen	Team

Christoph Eimer (born 12 March 1977, in Neuss) is a German former field hockey player who competed in the 2000 Summer Olympics and in the 2004 Summer Olympics.
