= Diederik van Weel =

Dutch field hockey player

Personal information
- Full name: Diederik David van Weel
- Born: 28 September 1973 (age 52) Baarn, Netherlands

Sport
- Sport: Field hockey
- Position: Defender
Senior career
Years	Team	Caps	Goals
–	Laren	-	-
–2002	Bloemendaal	-	-
2002–2005	Laren	-	-
National team
Years	Team	Caps	Goals
1998–2002	Netherlands	61	(0)
Medal record
Men's field hockey
Representing the Netherlands
Olympic Games
Gold medal – first place	2000 Sydney	Team
World Cup
Bronze medal – third place	2002 Kuala Lumpur	Team
EuroHockey Championship
Silver medal – second place	1999 Paduva	Team
Champions Trophy
Gold medal – first place	2000 Amstelveen	Team
Bronze medal – third place	1999 Brisbane	Team
Bronze medal – third place	2001 Rotterdam	Team

Diederik David van Weel (born 28 September 1973, in Baarn) is a former Dutch field hockey player, who played 61 international matches for the Netherlands, in which he didn't score a single goal. The defender made his debut for the Dutch on 17 August 1998 in a match against Argentina. He played in the Dutch League for HC Bloemendaal and Laren, and was a member of the team that won the gold medal at the 2000 Summer Olympics in Sydney. He stopped playing hockey in 2005.
