= Ramón Jufresa =

Spanish field hockey player (born 1970)

Personal information
- Full name: Ramón Jufresa Lluch
- Born: 18 April 1970 (age 56) Barcelona, Spain

Sport
- Sport: Field hockey
- Position: Goalkeeper
Senior career
| Years | Team | Caps | Goals |
| – | Club Egara | - | - |
National team
| Years | Team | Caps | Goals |
| – | Spain | | - |
Medal record
Men's field hockey
Representing Spain
Olympic Games
| Silver medal – second place | 1996 Atlanta | Team |
World Cup
| Silver medal – second place | 1998 Utrecht | Team |
Champions Trophy
| Bronze medal – third place | 1997 Adelaide | Team |

Ramón Jufresa Lluch (Note: In this Spanish name, the first or paternal surname is Jufresa and the second or maternal family name is Lluch.) (born 18 April 1970 in Barcelona, Catalonia) is a former field hockey goalkeeper from Spain. He won the silver medal with the men's national team at the 1996 Summer Olympics in Atlanta, Georgia. He also participated in the 1992 and 2000 Summer Olympics.
