= Lim Jong-chun =

Korean field hockey player

Medal record

Men's field hockey

Representing South Korea

Olympic Games
Silver medal – second place	2000 Sydney	Team

Asian Games
Gold medal – first place	2002 Busan	Team

Champions Trophy
Silver medal – second place	1999 Brisbane	Team
Bronze medal – third place	2000 Amstelveen	Team

Lim Jong-Chun (born 23 June 1978) is a South Korean former field hockey goalkeeper who competed in the 2000 Summer Olympics.
