= Jaap-Derk Buma =

Dutch field hockey player

Personal information
- Born: 27 August 1972 (age 53) The Hague, Netherlands

Sport
- Sport: Field hockey
- Position: Forward
Senior career
Years	Team	Caps	Goals
–	Klein Zwitserland	-	-
–	Bloemendaal	-	-
–	Amsterdam	-	-
–	Breda	-	-
National team
Years	Team	Caps	Goals
1994–2002	Netherlands	143	(19)
Medal record
Men's field hockey
Representing the Netherlands
Olympic Games
Gold medal – first place	2000 Sydney	Team
World Cup
Gold medal – first place	1998 Utrecht	Team
Bronze medal – third place	1998 Kuala Lumpur	Team
Champions Trophy
Gold medal – first place	1996 Madras	Team
Gold medal – first place	1998 Lahore	Team
Gold medal – first place	2000 Amstelveen	Team
Bronze medal – third place	1999 Brisbane	Team

Jaap-Derk Buma (born 27 August 1972 in The Hague) is a former Dutch field hockey player, who played 143 international matches for the Netherlands, in which he scored nineteen goals. The striker made his debut for the Dutch on 5 November 1994 in a match against Belgium. He played in the Dutch League for HC Klein Zwitserland, HC Bloemendaal, Amsterdam, and HC Breda, and was a member of the squad that won the golden medal at the 2000 Summer Olympics in Sydney. His father Edo was also a field hockey international for Holland.
