= Kalbir Takher =

British field hockey player

Personal information
- Born: 3 August 1968 (age 57) Wolverhampton, England
- Height: 178 cm (5 ft 10 in)
- Weight: 74 kg (163 lb)

Sport
- Sport: Field hockey
- Position: midfielder
Senior career
Years	Team	Caps	Goals
1985–1988	Wombourne	-	-
1988–2001	Cannock	-	-
National team
Years	Team	Caps	Goals
1995–1996	Great Britain	44	-
1993–1998	England	52	-
Medal record
Men's field hockey
Representing England
European Championship
Bronze medal – third place	1995 Dublin	Team

Kalbir Singh Takher (born 3 August 1968) is a former field hockey player, who participated in the 1996 Summer Olympics for Great Britain.

== Biography ==
Kalbir, nicknamed Kali was educated at Highfields School in Wolverhampton and studied at the University of Wolverhampton.

Playing for Wombourne Hockey Club he was called up for England U18 duty in 1986. For the 1988/89 season he left Wombourne to play club hockey for Cannock in the Men's England Hockey League. Taker made his England debut on 3 April 1993 against Germany and made his Great Britain debut on 9 December 1995 against Belgium.

Still at Cannock, he participated in the 1994 Men's Hockey World Cup and represented Great Britain at the 1996 Olympic Games in Atlanta. He would later become the captain of Cannock.

After retiring from playing he coached hockey for a number of clubs and ages.
