= Jason Duff =

Australian field hockey player

Medal record

Men's field hockey

Representing Australia

Olympic Games
| Bronze medal – third place | 2000 Sydney | Team |

Champions Trophy
| Gold medal – first place | 1993 Kuala Lumpur | Team |
| Gold medal – first place | 1999 Brisbane | Team |
| Silver medal – second place | 1997 Adelaide | Team |
| Bronze medal – third place | 1998 Lahore | Team |

Commonwealth Games
| Gold medal – first place | 1998 Kuala Lumpur | Team |

Jason Paul Duff (born 27 October 1972 in Melbourne, Victoria) is a former field hockey defender from Australia, who was a member of the team that won the bronze medal at the 2000 Summer Olympics in Sydney.

== Early life ==
Duff attended St. Leo the Great primary school in Altona North and attended high school at St. Paul's College in Altona North, Victoria. He was born into a sporting family with father Ken Duff a former VFL Footscray Football Club player and brother Darren Duff also an Australian field hockey representative. His eldest brother Craig was an accomplished club cricketer with both the Altona and Footscray Cricket Clubs. He tried his hand at many sports settling into Hockey as his winter recreation and Cricket in the summer. He showed a keen interest in cricket from an early age playing in his first U12 cricket match as a 5-year-old with the Williamstown CYMS cricket club. He soon showed good ability as a cricketer after moving to the Altona Cricket Club and being selected in the club's U14 Hatch Shield team as a 10-year-old. He progressed quickly through the senior ranks at Altona in the Sub District Cricket competition and was soon opening the batting in the first XI alongside his brother Craig Duff as a 15-year-old. Along with his brother Craig Duff, the brothers transferred to Footscray Cricket Club for the 1989/90 season with mixed success. Duff went on to captain the Victorian schools Western Zone U16 cricket team and was subsequently selected in the 1989/90 Victorian U17 State Cricket Team that competed in and won the Australian National Championship in Adelaide beating WA in the final, that would be the last season he played cricket preferring to take a chance on an international hockey career. Duff was introduced to hockey as a 10-year-old by his club cricket coach that was looking for players to fill some vacancies in the local Altona Hockey Club. His talent was not immediately apparent but he enjoyed the game, his potential as a hockey player was first identified as a 12-year-old when he was selected in the Victorian U13 state team that competed in the national championship in Brisbane. From that point on he was identified and featured regularly in Victorian State teams. Duff applied to the AIS hockey program at the end of the 1990 hockey season after winning the Altona Hockey Club senior Club Champion award. He was selected and departed Victoria in 1991 with his brother Darren Duff to take up a scholarship at the Perth-based institute.

== Career ==
He made his debut in 1993 for the Australian Men's Hockey Team, "The Kookaburras" at the Champion's Trophy tournament in Kuala Lumpur where the team won Gold beating Germany in the final 4–1. In the same year Duff captained the Australian U21 team to a bronze medal at the Hockey Junior World Cup in Terrassa, Spain. Duff was a member of the Olympic Hockey Squad in 1996 but missed selection to the final 16. He became a more consistent member of the team after the Atlanta Olympics, playing in the team's 4th placed World Cup team in Utrecht, The Netherlands in 1998. He was also selected in the 1998 Kuala Lumpur Commonwealth Games team, hockey's inaugural appearance at the games and won Gold, beating hosts Malaysia 4–0 in the final. In a 1999 Perth club game with his team YMCC Duff tragically went down with a knee injury, tearing the ACL in his right knee. He was forced to work hard to secure selection in the Sydney 2000 Olympic team whilst he rehabilitated his reconstructed knee, he faced several setbacks in this phase tearing a quadriceps muscle at the 1999 Champion's Trophy in Amsterdam, the Netherlands. In the race to be fit Duff fast-tracked his rehabilitation and was ultimately selected in that team and won a bronze medal, after a heart breaking loss in penalties in the semi-final to the Dutch, who went on to win the gold medal. Duff was forced to retire at the end of the 2000 Olympic Games with complication's to his knee injury making it impossible to continue to play at the elite level.
