= Kim Yong-bae (field hockey) =

South Korean field hockey player

- Hangul: 김용배
- Hanja: 金龍培
- RR: Gim Yongbae
- MR: Kim Yongbae

Kim Yong-bae
Medal record

Men's field hockey

Representing South Korea

Olympic Games
Silver medal – second place	2000 Sydney	Team

Asian Games
Gold medal – first place	2002 Busan	Team
Gold medal – first place	2006 Doha	Team
Silver medal – second place	1998 Bangkok	Team

Champions Trophy
Silver medal – second place	1999 Brisbane	Team
Bronze medal – third place	2000 Amstelveen	Team

Kim Yong-bae (born 4 February 1974) is a South Korean former field hockey player who competed in the 1996 Summer Olympics, in the 2000 Summer Olympics, in the 2004 Summer Olympics, and in the 2008 Summer Olympics.
