= Víctor Pujol =

Spanish field hockey player (born 1967)

Personal information
- Full name: Victor Pujol
- Born: 4 October 1967 (age 58) Barcelona, Spain

Sport
- Sport: Field hockey
- Position: Midfielder
Senior career
Years	Team	Caps	Goals
–	Club Egara	-	-
National team
Years	Team	Caps	Goals
–	Spain		-
Medal record
Men's field hockey
Representing Spain
Olympic Games
Silver medal – second place	1996 Atlanta	Team
World Cup
Silver medal – second place	1998 Utrecht	Team
Champions Trophy
Bronze medal – third place	1997 Adelaide	Team

Víctor Pujol Sala (born 4 October 1967 in Barcelona, Catalonia) is a former field hockey midfielder from Spain. He won the silver medal with the men's national team at the 1996 Summer Olympics in Atlanta, Georgia. There he scored the only goal for the Spaniards in the final against the Netherlands (1–3).
