= Peter Windt =

Dutch field hockey player

Medal record

Men's field hockey

Representing the Netherlands

Olympic Games
Gold medal – first place	2000 Sydney	Team

Champions Trophy
Gold medal – first place	2000 Amstelveen	Team
Bronze medal – third place	1999 Brisbane	Team

Pieter "Peter" Windt (born 3 May 1973 in Veendam) is a former Dutch field hockey player, who played 69 international matches for the Netherlands, in which he didn't score a single goal. The defender and midfielder made his debut for the Dutch on 21 January 1997 in a match against Argentina. He was a member of the team that won the gold medal at the 2000 Summer Olympics in Sydney.
