= Ramón Sala =

Spanish field hockey player (born 1971)

Personal information
- Full name: Ramón Sala Vallhonrat
- Born: 8 August 1971 (age 54) Terrassa, Spain

Sport
- Sport: Field hockey
- Position: Defender
Senior career
Years	Team	Caps	Goals
–	Club Egara	-	-
National team
Years	Team	Caps	Goals
–	Spain		-
Medal record
Men's field hockey
Representing Spain
Olympic Games
Silver medal – second place	1996 Atlanta	Team
World Cup
Silver medal – second place	1998 Utrecht	Team
Champions Trophy
Bronze medal – third place	1997 Adelaide	Team

Ramón Sala Vallhonrat (born 8 August 1971 in Terrassa, Catalonia) is a former field hockey defender from Spain, who won the silver medal with the men's national team at the 1996 Summer Olympics in Atlanta, Georgia.
