= Jason Lee (field hockey) =

British field hockey player and coach

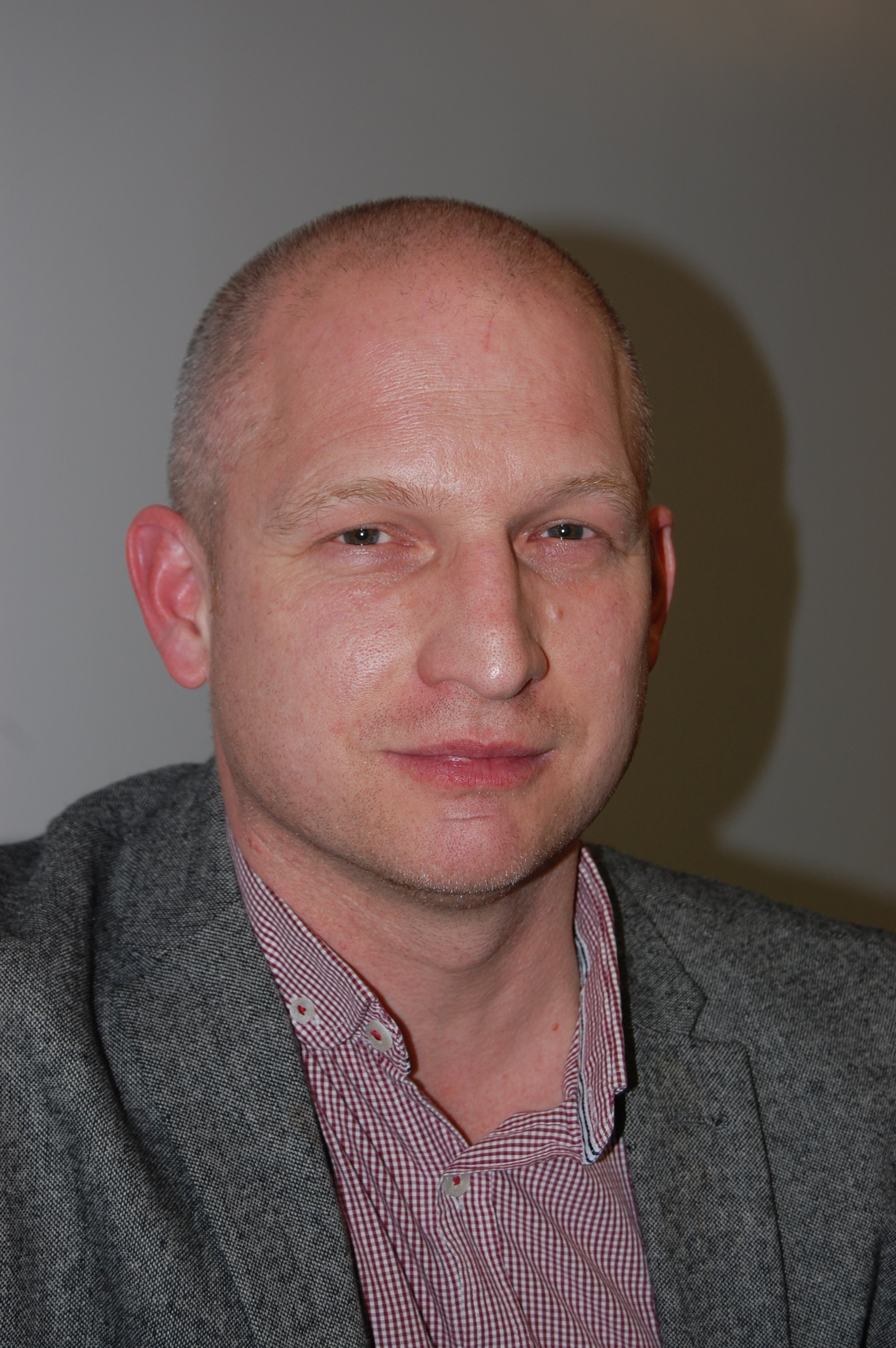
- Lee in February 2015

Personal information
- Born: 21 May 1970 (age 56) Hayes, England
- Height: 177 cm (5 ft 10 in)
- Weight: 79 kg (174 lb)

Sport
- Sport: Field hockey
Senior career
Years	Team	Caps	Goals
1988–1995	East Grinstead	-	-
1995–1998	Old Loughtonians	-	-
National team
Years	Team	Caps	Goals
–	Great Britain	35	-
–	England	82	-
Medal record
Men's field hockey
Representing England
EuroHockey Nations Championship
Gold medal – first place	2009 Amsterdam	Team
Silver medal – second place	2013 Boom	Team
Bronze medal – third place	2011 Gladbach	Team
Representing Great Britain
Champions Trophy
Silver medal – second place	2010 Gladbach	Team
World League
Bronze medal – third place	2012–13	Team

Jason David Lee (born 21 May 1970)) is an English field hockey coach and former international player. As a player, he won 82 caps for England and 35 for Great Britain, scoring 35 goals. He played in the 1992 and 1996 Summer Olympics.

== Biography ==
=== Playing career ===
Lee was born at Hayes in Greater London and was educated at Borden Grammar School and while a pupil there was selected for the England U18 team. He played hockey at Old Bordenians Hockey Club in Sittingbourne, Kent.

He played club hockey for East Grinstead in the Men's England Hockey League from 1988, making his first appearance at the Olympics in 1992. He joined Old Loughtonians at the start of the 1995/96 season.

While at Old Loughtonians, he participated in the 1996 Olympic Games and the 1998 Men's Hockey World Cup but retired after the World Cup competition to take up coaching.

=== Coaching career ===
Lee started coaching for England men from 2003 and Great Britain men from 2004. His squads competed at three successive Olympic Games (2004, 2008 and 2012), and took England to their first ever European title, at the 2009 EuroHockey Nations Championship. He stood down after the 2012 Summer Olympics in order to start coaching the England women's squad. He also coached the team at the Commonwealth Games.

Lee led the England men's team from 11th to 4th in the FIH World Rankings and also took the England women's team to a World Ranking high of 3rd, after achieving a silver medal with them in the 2013 European Nations, losing to Germany on penalties in the final.

He stood down from coaching England and Great Britain in 2014. He was a Head Coach for England and GB for eleven years, GB's longest ever serving international head coach.

Lee was named in Loughborough University's Sporting Hall of Fame in 2010 alongside greats such as Lord Sebastian Coe. He is also a member of UKSport's Elite Coach alumni.
