= Kim Jung-chul =

South Korean field hockey player

- Hangul: 김정철
- RR: Gim Jeongcheol
- MR: Kim Chŏngch'ŏl

Kim Jung-chul
Medal record

Men's field hockey

Representing South Korea

Olympic Games
Silver medal – second place	2000 Sydney	Team

Asian Games
Gold medal – first place	2002 Busan	Team
Silver medal – second place	1998 Bangkok	Team

Asia Cup
Gold medal – first place	1999 Kuala Lumpur	

Champions Trophy
Silver medal – second place	1999 Brisbane	
Bronze medal – third place	2000 Amstelveen	

Kim Jung-chul (born 1 January 1977) is a South Korean former field hockey player who competed in the 2000 Summer Olympics and in the 2004 Summer Olympics.
