= Edo Buma =

Dutch field hockey player

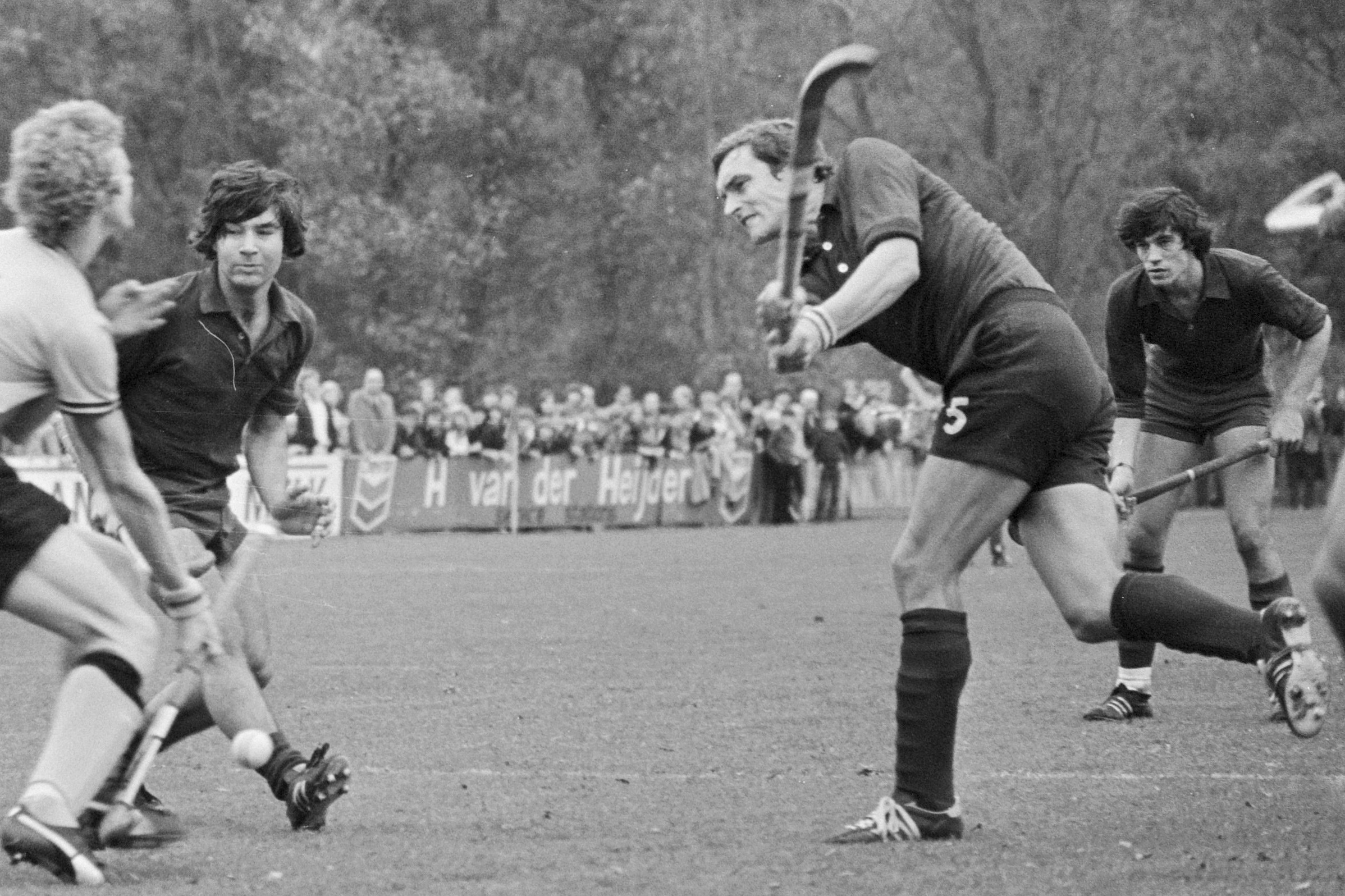
- Edo Buma (No 5) in 1976

Personal information
- Born: 31 March 1946 (age 80) Enschede, the Netherlands
- Height: 1.83 m (6 ft 0 in)
- Weight: 80 kg (180 lb)

Sport
- Sport: Field hockey
- Club: DKS, Enschede; HHIJC, Den Haag

Edo Buma (born 31 March 1946) is a retired field hockey player from the Netherlands. He competed at the 1968 Summer Olympics, where his team finished in fifth place. His son Jaap-Derk Buma won an Olympic gold medal in field hockey in 2000.
