= Lim Jung-woo (field hockey) =

South Korean field hockey player

- Hangul: 임정우
- RR: Im Jeongu
- MR: Im Chŏngu

Lim Jung-woo
Medal record

Men's field hockey

Representing South Korea

Olympic Games
Silver medal – second place	2000 Sydney	Team

Asian Games
Silver medal – second place	1998 Bangkok	Team

Champions Trophy
Silver medal – second place	1999 Brisbane	Team
Bronze medal – third place	2000 Amstelveen	Team

Champions Challenge
Silver medal – second place	2003 Johannesburg	Team

Lim Jung-woo (born January 20, 1978) is a field hockey player from South Korea, who was a member of the Men's National Team that won the silver medal at the 2000 Summer Olympics in Sydney. In the final the Asians lost to title holders the Netherlands after penalty strokes. Lim, a student physical education on the Korea National University, also competed at the 2004 Summer Olympics in Athens.
