= 1999 Men's Hockey Asia Cup =

Field hockey competition

Tournament details
- Host country: Malaysia
- City: Kuala Lumpur
- Teams: 9

Final positions
- Champions: South Korea (2nd title)
- Runner-up: Pakistan
- Third place: India

Tournament statistics
- Matches played: 20
- Goals scored: 125 (6.25 per match)

The 1999 Men's Hockey Asia Cup was the fifth edition of the Hockey Asia Cup for men. It was held from November 18 to November 28, 1999 in Kuala Lumpur, Malaysia. The winner of this tournament qualified for the 2002 Men's Hockey World Cup in Malaysia. South Korea defeated Pakistan 5-4 in the final to win their second title. India came in third.

== Results ==
All times are (UTC+8).

=== Group stage ===
Advanced to semifinals

==== Pool A ====
Team	Pld	W	D	L	GF	GA	GD	Pts
Pakistan	4	4	0	0	32	1	+31	12
South Korea	4	3	0	1	19	2	+17	9
Bangladesh	4	1	1	2	8	12	-4	4
China	4	1	1	2	7	17	-10	4
Sri Lanka	4	0	0	4	1	35	-34	0

18 November 1999
20:05

China	4–0	Sri Lanka

19 November 1999
16:05

South Korea	4–0	Bangladesh

19 November 1999
20:05

Pakistan	15–0	Sri Lanka

20 November 1999
18:05

Bangladesh	1–1	China

21 November 1999
18:05

South Korea	9–0	Sri Lanka

21 November 1999
20:05

Pakistan	10–1	China

22 November 1999
16:05

Bangladesh	7–1	Sri Lanka

23 November 1999
18:05

South Korea	6–1	China

23 November 1999
20:05

Pakistan	6–0	Bangladesh

24 November 1999
20:05

Pakistan	1–0	South Korea

==== Pool B ====
Team	Pld	W	D	L	GF	GA	GD	Pts
India	3	2	1	0	9	2	+7	7
Malaysia	3	1	2	0	11	4	+7	5
Japan	3	1	1	1	7	6	+1	4
Hong Kong	3	0	0	3	2	17	−15	0

18 November 1999
18:05

India	3–1	Japan
Tirkey 4'; Gagan Ajit Singh 22'; Nayak 51'	Report	Takahashi ?'

19 November 1999
18:05

Malaysia	8–1	Hong Kong

20 November 1999
20:05

India	1–1	Malaysia
Gagan Ajit Singh 44'	Report	Shanmuganathan 15'

22 November 1999
18:05

Malaysia	2–2	Japan

22 November 1999
20:05

India	5–0	Hong Kong
Raghuvanshi 2'; Thakur 18'; Lakra 37'; Dhillon 39'; Pillay 54'	Report

24 November 1999
18:05

Japan	4–1	Hong Kong

=== Finals ===
Semi-finals
26 November
South Korea	5
India	4
26 November
Pakistan	3
Malaysia	2

Final
28 November
South Korea	5
Pakistan	4
Third place
28 November
India	4
Malaysia	2

=== Semi-finals ===
November 26, 1999

South Korea	5–4	India
Shin Seok Kya 3'; Hwang Jong-hyun 5'; Jeon Jong-ha 25'; Kim Jung-chul 60'; Ji Seong-hwan 69'	Report	Tirkey 9'; Dhillon 15'; Thakur 22'; Pillay 42'

November 26, 1999

Pakistan	3–2	Malaysia
Anis 27', 49'; Sohail Abbas ?'	Report	Nawawi 4'; Shanmuganathan 67'

=== Third and fourth place ===
November 28, 1999

India	4–2	Malaysia
Senthil 44'; Thakur 50', 61'; Pillay 64'	Report	Saiful 53'; Nawawi 69'

=== Final ===
November 28, 1999

Pakistan	4–5	South Korea
Iqbal 9'; Sarwar 22'; Reza 25'; Jawed 42'	Report	Hwang Jong-hyun 13', ?'; Yeo Woon-kon 53'; Jeon Jong-ha 60'; Song Seung-tae ?'

== Winners ==
1999 Men's Hockey Asia Cup winners

South Korea
Second title

== Final standings ==
1. South Korea
2. Pakistan
3. India
4. Malaysia
5. Japan
6. Bangladesh
7. China
8. Hong Kong
9. Sri Lanka
