= Tycho van Meer =

Dutch field hockey player

Medal record

Men's field hockey

Representing the Netherlands

Olympic Games
Gold medal – first place	1996 Atlanta	Team competition

World Cup
Gold medal – first place	1998 Utrecht	Team competition

Champions Trophy
Bronze medal – third place	1999 Brisbane	Team competition

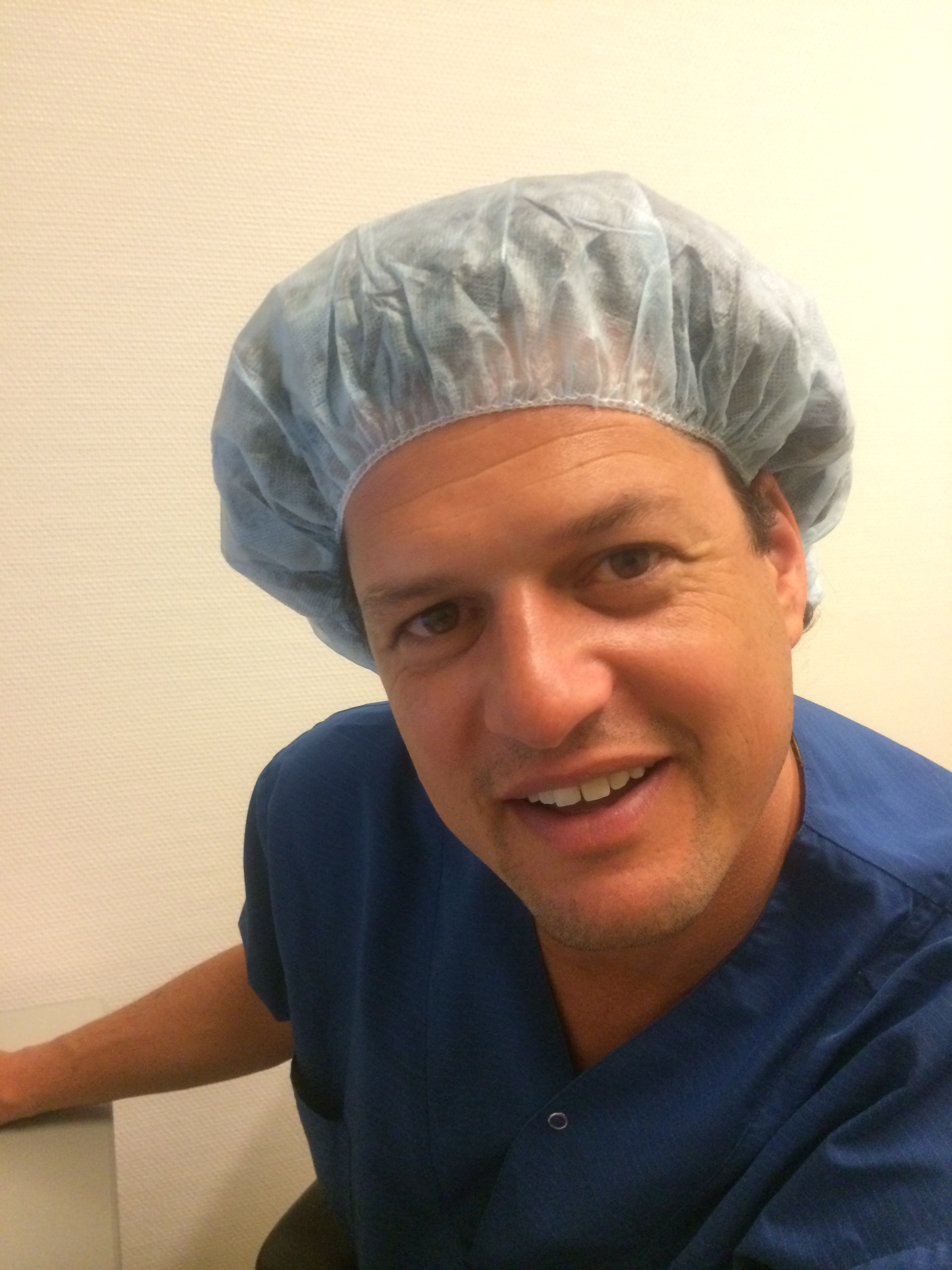

Tycho van Meer (born 30 September 1974 in Eindhoven) is a former field hockey striker from the Netherlands, who represented his native country at the 1996 Summer Olympics in Atlanta, Georgia. There he won the golden medal with the Dutch national team. A former player of HGC, Oranje Zwart and Amsterdam, he earned a total number of 90 caps, scoring seventeen goals for the Dutch during the late 1990s.
