= Jon Wyatt =

British field hockey player

Jon Wyatt OLY
Personal information
- Born: 12 February 1973 (age 53) Southampton, England
- Height: 195 cm (6 ft 5 in)
- Weight: 83 kg (183 lb)

Sport
- Sport: Field hockey
Senior career
Years	Team	Caps	Goals
1991–2005	Reading	-	-
National team
Years	Team	Caps	Goals
1995–2005	GB	77	-
1995–2005	England	195	-
Medal record
Men's field hockey
Representing England
Commonwealth Games
Bronze medal – third place	1998 Kuala Lumpur	Team
European Championship
Bronze medal – third place	1995 Dublin	Team
Bronze medal – third place	1999 Padua	Team

Jonathan Francis Wyatt (born 12 February 1973) is a British former field hockey player who competed in the 1996 Summer Olympics and in the 2000 Summer Olympics.

== Biography ==
Wyatt was educated at Royal Grammar School, High Wycombe and played club hockey for Reading in the Men's England Hockey League and it was while at Reading that he made his major tournament appearances.

At the 1996 Olympic Games in Atlanta, he represented Great Britain. He won a bronze medal representing England at the 1998 Commonwealth Games in Kuala Lumpur and participated in the 1998 Men's Hockey World Cup.

A second Olympic appearance ensued at the 2000 Olympic Games in Sydney, where he captained the team before he represented England at the 2002 Commonwealth Games in Manchester.

In 2018, Wyatt was appointed as Sport and Development Director for the International Hockey Federation (FIH).
