= Lachlan Dreher =

Australian field hockey player

Personal information
- Born: 11 April 1967 (age 59)
Medal record
Men's field hockey
Representing Australia
Olympic Games
Silver medal – second place	1992 Barcelona	Team competition
Bronze medal – third place	1996 Atlanta	Team competition
Bronze medal – third place	2000 Sydney	Team competition
Champions Trophy
Gold medal – first place	1999 Brisbane	Team competition

Lachlan George Dreher (born 11 April 1967 in Melbourne, Victoria) is a former field hockey goalkeeper from Australia, who competed in three consecutive Summer Olympics for his native country, starting in 1992.
