= Joaquim Malgosa =

Spanish field hockey player (born 1963)

Personal information
- Full name: Joaquim Malgosa Morera
- Born: 1 November 1963 (age 62) Terrassa, Spain

Sport
- Sport: Field hockey
- Position: Defender
Senior career
Years	Team	Caps	Goals
–	Atlètic Terrassa	-	-
National team
Years	Team	Caps	Goals
–	Spain		-
Medal record
Men's field hockey
Representing Spain
Olympic Games
Silver medal – second place	1996 Atlanta	Team
World Cup
Silver medal – second place	1998 Utrecht	Team
Champions Trophy
Bronze medal – third place	1997 Adelaide	Team

Joaquim Malgosa Morera (born 1 November 1963 in Terrassa, Catalonia) is a former field hockey defender.

He played for the Atlètic Terrassa all his career, and won the silver medal with the men's national team at the 1996 Summer Olympics in Atlanta, Georgia. He also participated in the 1988 and 1992 Summer Olympics.

== Trophies ==
- 1 EuroHockey Club Champions Cup (1985)
- 1 European CupWinners cup (1994)
- 11 Leagues
- 10 Cups
- 12 Catalonia Championships

== International appearances ==
- 3 Olympic Games (Seoul 88, Barcelona 92, Atlanta 96)
- 3 Hockey World Cup (London 86, Lahore 90, Sydney 94)
- 3 EuroHockey Nations Championship (Moscow 87, Paris 91, Dublin 95)
- 3 Champions Trophy (Amsterdam 87, Lahore 88, Kuala Lumpur 93)
- 2 Intercontinental Cups (Barcelona 85, Poznan 93)
