= Mark Pearn =

British field hockey player (born 1977)

Personal information
- Born: 21 March 1977 (age 49) Bristol, England
- Height: 1.78 m (5 ft 10 in)

Sport
- Sport: Field hockey
- Position: Midfield/Forward
Senior career
Years	Team	Caps	Goals
1991–1995	Gloucester City	-	-
1995–2004	Reading	-	-
2004–2005	Barcelona	-	-
2005–2015	East Grinstead	-	-
2015–2016	Richmond	-	-
2016–2024	Surbiton (coach)	-	-
National team
Years	Team	Caps	Goals
1995–2012	England	157	(50)
1996–2012	Great Britain	89	(24)
Medal record
Men's field hockey
Representing England
Commonwealth Games
Bronze medal – third place	1998 Kuala Lumpur	Team
European Championship
Bronze medal – third place	1999 Padua	Team
Bronze medal – third place	2003 Barcelona	Team
Bronze medal – third place	2011 Gladbach	Team

Mark Worden Pearn (born 21 March 1977) is a male retired English field hockey player who competed at two Olympic Games.

== Biography ==
Pearn was a member of the England and Great Britain squads, making his debut for England against the Netherlands in the 1995 Champions Trophy in Berlin. He scored his first international goal against India in the tournament to become the youngest player to score for England at just 18 years old.

Pearn played club hockey for Gloucester City before joining Reading for the 1995/1996 season. It was at Reading that he gained his major honours, participating in the 1998 Commonwealth Games and 1998 Men's Hockey World Cup before representing Great Britain at the 2000 Olympic Games in Sydney, in the field hockey tournament.

Still at Reading, he represented England at the 2002 Commonwealth Games in Manchester, the 2002 Men's Hockey World Cup and went to his second Olympics at the 2004 Olympic Games in Athens.

Pearn was voted UK Player of the Year by members of the Hockey Writers' Club twice, in 2000 and 2011.

He initially retired in 2005 but returned to international hockey in 2011 at the age of 33 to challenge for a place in the 2012 London Olympic Games. Having played in the 2011 London Cup, the 2011 European Championship, 2011 Champions Trophy and 2012 London Olympics Test Event, he was not selected for the final Olympic squad and retired for the second time in 2013.

Pearn later played club hockey for Barcelona, East Grinstead (player/coach) and Richmond (player/assistant coach).

Pearn signed as the head coach of Surbiton men's first team in May 2016. He left Surbiton at the end of the 2023/2024 season.
