= Remco van Wijk =

Dutch field hockey player

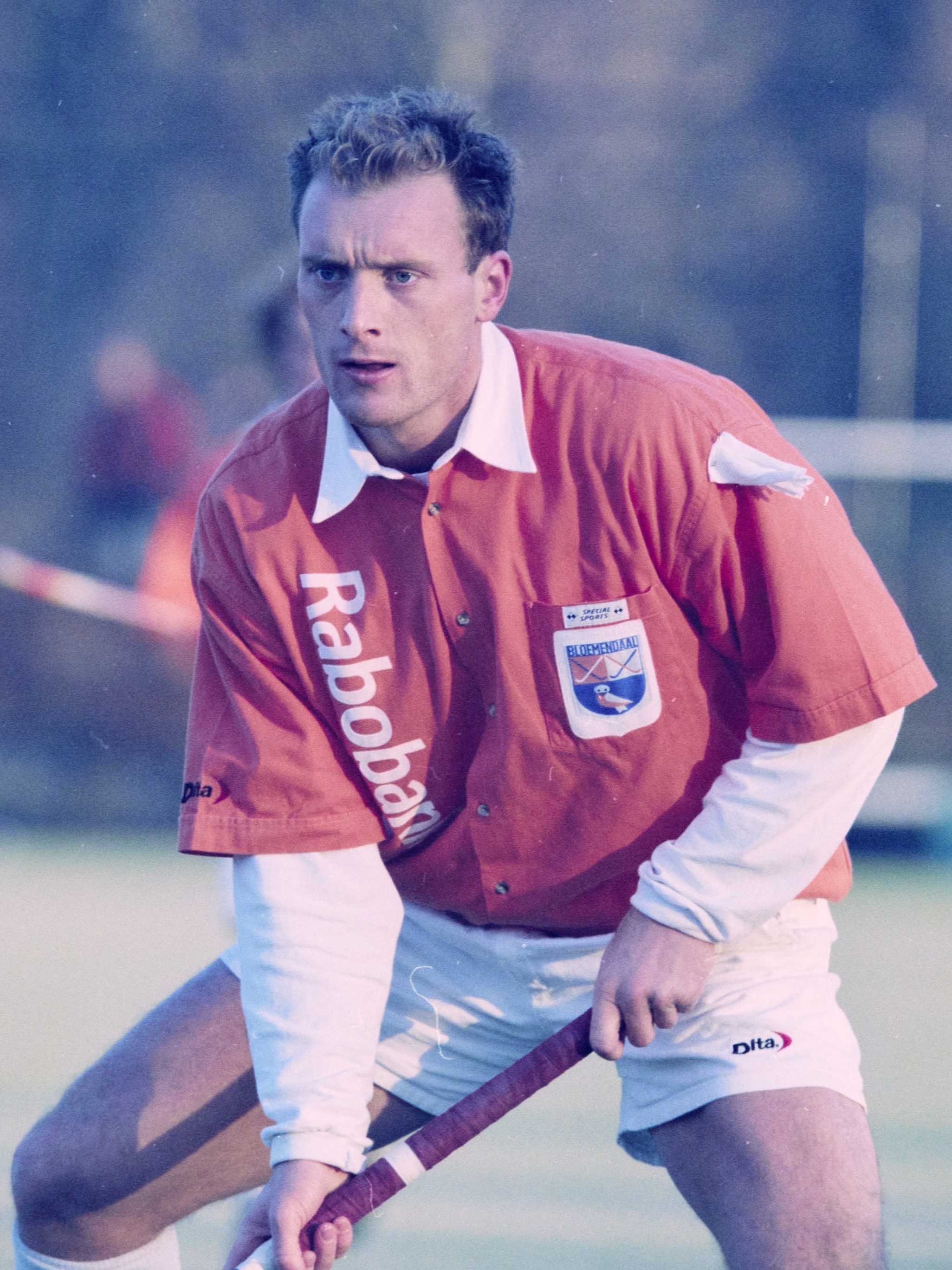
- van Wijk in 1998

Personal information
- Born: 7 September 1972 (age 53) Breda, Netherlands

Sport
- Sport: Field hockey
- Position: Forward
Senior career
Years	Team	Caps	Goals
–	Prinsenbeek	-	-
–	Bloemendaal	-	-
National team
Years	Team	Caps	Goals
1993–2002	Netherlands	242	(63)
Medal record
Men's field hockey
Representing the Netherlands
Olympic Games
Gold medal – first place	1996 Atlanta	Team
Gold medal – first place	2000 Sydney	Team
World Cup
Gold medal – first place	1998 Utrecht	Team
Silver medal – second place	1994 Sydney	Team
Bronze medal – third place	2002 Kuala Lumpur	Team
Champions Trophy
Gold medal – first place	1996 Madras	Team
Gold medal – first place	1998 Lahore	Team
Gold medal – first place	2000 Amstelveen	Team
Bronze medal – third place	1993 Kuala Lumpur	Team
Bronze medal – third place	1994 Lahore	Team
Bronze medal – third place	1999 Brisbane	Team
Bronze medal – third place	2001 Rotterdam	Team

Remco van Wijk (born 7 October 1972) is a former Dutch field hockey player, who played 242 international matches for the Netherlands, in which he scored 63 goals. The striker made his debut for the Dutch on 5 May 1993 in a friendly match against Ireland (5-1). He retired from international tophockey after the 2002 Men's Hockey World Cup in Kuala Lumpur, Malaysia, and became a hockey coach in the summer of 2005, as an assistant at HC Den Bosch.
