= Pablo Usoz =

Spanish field hockey player (born 1968)

Personal information
- Full name: Pablo Usoz Ciriza
- Born: 31 December 1968 (age 57) Madrid, Spain
- Height: 178 cm (5 ft 10 in)
Medal record
Men's field hockey
Representing Spain
Olympic Games
Silver medal – second place	1996 Atlanta	Team
World Cup
Silver medal – second place	1998 Utrecht	Team
Champions Trophy
Silver medal – second place	1997 Adelaide	Team

Pablo Usoz Ciriza (Note: In this Spanish name, the first or paternal surname is Usoz and the second or maternal family name is Ciriza.) (born 31 December 1968) is a Spanish field hockey player and coach. He won a silver medal at the 1996 Summer Olympics in Atlanta. He also competed at the 1992 and 2000 Summer Olympics.

His father Luis Usoz was also an international and Olympic hockey player and his son Pablo Usoz Jr. won the English 2026 Premier league title with Old Georgians.
