= Jacques Brinkman =

Dutch field hockey player

Medal record

Men's field hockey

Representing the Netherlands

Olympic Games
Gold medal – first place	1996 Atlanta	Team competition
Gold medal – first place	2000 Sydney	Team competition
Bronze medal – third place	1988 Seoul	Team competition

World Cup
Gold medal – first place	1990 Lahore	Team competition
Gold medal – first place	1998 Utrecht	Team competition

Champions Trophy
Gold medal – first place	2000 Amstelveen	Team competition
Bronze medal – third place	1999 Brisbane	Team competition

Jacques Brinkman (born 26 August 1966 in Utrecht) is a former Dutch field hockey player, who twice won the golden medal with the national squad: at the 1996 Summer Olympics in Atlanta and four years later, at the 2000 Summer Olympics in Sydney. There he played his last international tournament for the Dutch, after a career spanning more than thirteen years.

Brinkman made his debut on 1 May 1987 in a friendly match against West-Germany. As a midfielder, he played 337 international matches for Holland, in which he scored 84 goals, making him Holland's most capped player. Brinkman surpassed the previous record holder, Cees Jan Diepeveen, in 1998. He won the Hockey World Cup in 1990 and 1998, and also the annual Champions Trophy (1996, 1998 and 2000). In the Dutch League he played for Kampong, Amsterdam H&BC and Stichtse Cricket en Hockey Club. Since the summer of 2003 he has been head coach with his former club from SCHC from Bilthoven.
