= Danny Hall (field hockey) =

British field hockey player

Personal information
- Born: 30 November 1974 (age 51) Chertsey, Surrey, England
- Height: 180 cm (5 ft 11 in)
- Weight: 82 kg (181 lb)

Sport
- Sport: Field hockey
- Position: Forward
Senior career
Years	Team	Caps	Goals
1994–2007	Guildford	-	-
2007–2012	East Grinstead	-	-
2013–2014	Holcombe	-	-
National team
Years	Team	Caps	Goals
–	GB & England		-
Medal record
Men's field hockey
Representing England
Commonwealth Games
Bronze medal – third place	1998 Kuala Lumpur	Team
European Championship
Bronze medal – third place	1999 Padua	Team
Bronze medal – third place	2003 Barcelona	Team

Daniel James Hall (born 30 November 1974) is a former field hockey forward from England, who participated in three Summer Olympics in 1996, 2000 and 2004.

== Biography ==
Hall played club hockey for Guildford in the Men's England Hockey League and was capped by the England U21 in 1995.

Hall went to three Olympic Games, the first representing Great Britain at the 1996 Olympic Games in Atlanta and the second was representing Great Britain at the 2000 Olympic Games in Sydney. Still at Guildford and the captain of his club, Hall represented England at the 2002 Commonwealth Games in Manchester and participated in his third Olympics at the 2004 Olympic Games in Athens.

He later played for East Grinstead and Holcombe.
