= Andy Humphrey =

British field hockey player

Personal information
- Born: May 1973 (age 53) Upper Poppleton, York, England

Sport
- Sport: Field hockey
- Position: Defender
Senior career
Years	Team	Caps	Goals
1989–1995	Welton	-	-
1995–2015	Cannock	-	-
National team
Years	Team	Caps	Goals
–	GB		-
–	England		-
Medal record
Men's field hockey
Representing England
European Championship
Bronze medal – third place	1999 Padua	Team

Andrew Richard Humphrey (born May 1973) is a British former field hockey player who played for GB and England.

== Biography ==
Humphrey was born in 1975 and won a sports award from the Harrogate Borough Council in 1988 for a U-19 tour of Canada.

He played club hockey for Welton in the Men's England Hockey League and participated in the 1992 European Junior Cup before gaining full England international honours but just missed out on selection for the 1994 Men's Hockey World Cup.

Humphrey joined Cannock for the 1995–96 England Hockey League season and gained immediate success winning the league title with the club. While at Cannock he won six more league titles and three Hockey Association Cups, in addition to representing England at two World Cups in 1998 and 2002 and Great Britain at the 2000 Champions Trophy.

In 2015 he was still playing for the Cannock Veterans team.
