= Daniel Sproule =

Australian field hockey player (born 1974)

Personal information
- Born: 25 January 1974 (age 52) Melbourne, Victoria
- Height: 180 cm (5 ft 11 in)
- Weight: 76 kg (168 lb)
Medal record
Men's field hockey
Representing Australia
Olympic Games
Bronze medal – third place	1996 Atlanta	Team
Bronze medal – third place	2000 Sydney	Team
Champions Trophy
Gold medal – first place	1999 Brisbane	Team
Commonwealth Games
Gold medal – first place	1998 Kuala Lumpur	Team

Daniel Sproule (born 25 January 1974 in Melbourne, Victoria) is a former field hockey defender from Australia, who was a member of the team that won the bronze medal at the 2000 Summer Olympics in Sydney. Four years earlier, when Atlanta, Georgia hosted the Games, he won his first bronze medal at the Olympics.

Sproule has been a regular member of The Kookaburras team since missing the 1994 Hockey World Cup in Sydney. He won the gold medal with Australia at the 1998 Commonwealth Games in Kuala Lumpur, and did the same a year later at the 1999 Champions Trophy held in Brisbane.
