= Christian Mayerhöfer =

German field hockey player

Personal information
- Born: 16 June 1971 (age 55) Mainz, West Germany

Sport
- Sport: Field hockey
Senior career
Years	Team	Caps	Goals
–	Dürkheim	-	-
National team
Years	Team	Caps	Goals
1992–2002	Germany		-
Medal record
Men's field hockey
Representing Germany
Olympic Games
Gold medal – first place	1992 Barcelona	Team
World Cup
Gold medal – first place	2002 Kuala Lumpur	Team
Bronze medal – third place	1998 Utrecht	Team
Champions Trophy
Gold medal – first place	1995 Berlin	Team
Gold medal – first place	1997 Adelaide	Team
Gold medal – first place	2001 Rotterdam	Team
Silver medal – second place	1993 Kuala Lumpur	Team
Silver medal – second place	1994 Lahore	Team
Silver medal – second place	2000 Amstelveen	Team
Bronze medal – third place	1996 Madras	Team

Christian Mayerhöfer (born 16 June 1971 in Mainz) is a German former field hockey player who competed in the 1992 Summer Olympics, in the 1996 Summer Olympics, and in the 2000 Summer Olympics.
