= Juan Escarré =

Spanish field hockey player

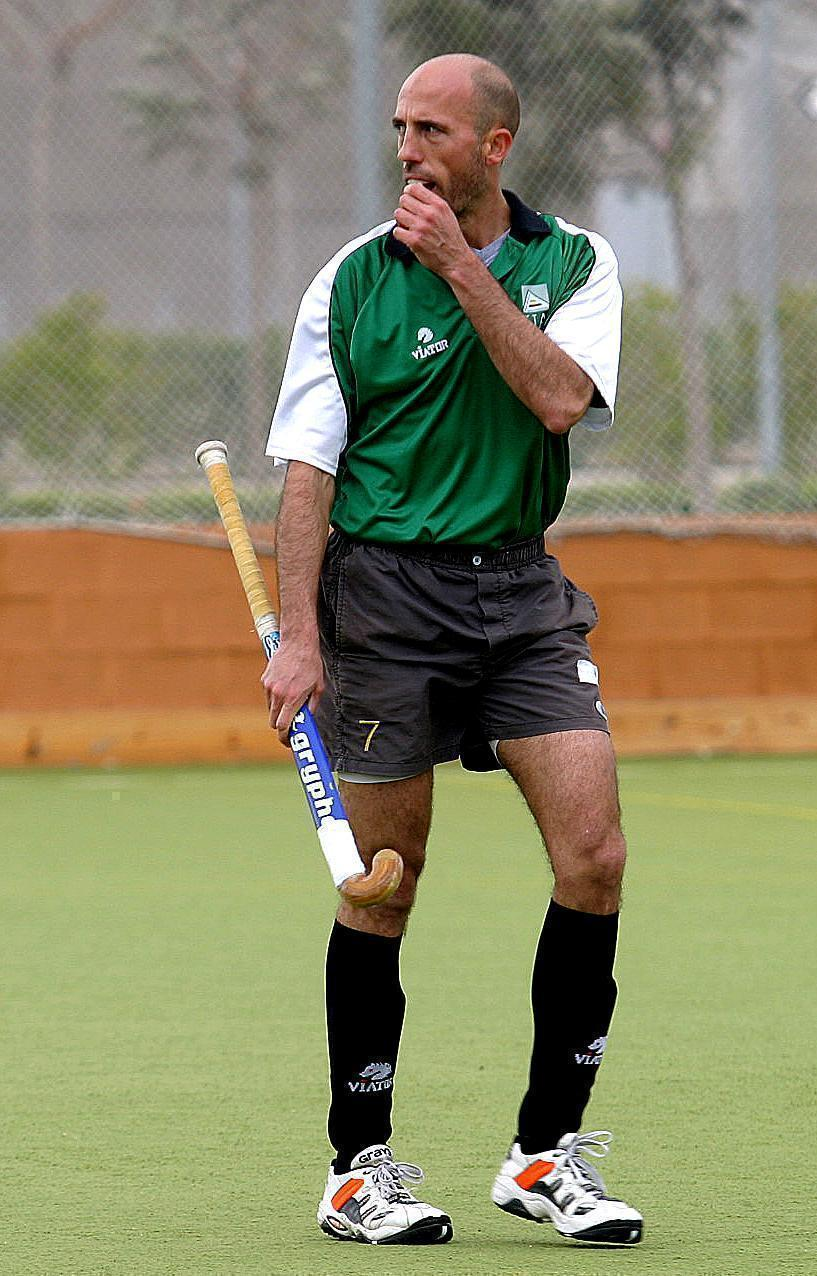

Medal record

Men's field hockey

Representing Spain

Olympic Games
Silver medal – second place	1996 Atlanta	Team

World Cup
Silver medal – second place	1998 Utrecht	Team

European Championship
Gold medal – first place	2005 Leipzig	Team

Champions Trophy
Gold medal – first place	2004 Lahore	Team

Champions Challenge
Gold medal – first place	2003 Johannesburg	Team

Juan Escarré Urueña (born 23 February 1969 in Alicante) is a Spanish field hockey player, who competed for Spain in three Summer Olympics, starting in 1996, when he captured the silver medal with his national side. In December 2004 the veteran midfielder won the Champions Trophy in Lahore, Pakistan, the next year followed by the 2005 Men's Hockey European Nations Cup in Leipzig, Germany.

== Personal life ==
Escarre hails from Alicante, Spain. He married Garcia and they have a daughter Martina. They also adopted an Indian girl Saumya.

== International career ==
Escarre played in three Olympics and three World Cups. His first World Cup was in 1998. He played in the 1996, 2000 and 2004 Summer Olympics. Beginning with his first World Cup in 1994, he played two more in 1998 and 2002. He also played in six Champions Trophy tournaments for Spain. He was part of the Spanish team that won the silver medal at the Utrecht World Cup in 1998.

== Club Atlético San Vicente ==
The Club of San Vicente del Raspeig was founded in 1969, the year of birth of Juan Escarré. It was the club where he has run most of his career since, was only played full seasons in FC Barcelona and the Complutense. In the other clubs only going to play once your club was insured to contest the ascent phase and returning to play it. Note that in addition to player has been the coach of the team since 1990 along with the help of his brother Roberto Escarré. It was also the Coordinator of the sports schools sanvicentero club.

=== 1997–98 ===
The team led by Escarré began to war on the national scene. In the Qualifying (South Central) achieved a creditable 2nd place which entitled him to all San Vicente to the finals (with a system of single round robin and with 4 teams), which was in 4th place behind Club de Campo Villa de Madrid, Egara 1935 and Champion Club Atlético San Sebastian respectively.

=== 1998–99 ===
It was an epic season for the whole Raspeig, where John Escarré exercised the functions of a player and coach. The runner-up team proclaims Group A (South Central), level on points with the first-placed Barrocanes Hockey Club and ahead of the WCR Covadonga and Atlètic 1952. In the Final round in San Vicente del Raspeig on the campus of the University of Alicante, got a 2nd place behind champion Egara 1935 (sanvicentero all let out a 2–0 lead in the match against Club Egara subsidiary ), having to advertise with the eleventh ranked in Division Honor, the FC Barcelona.

This last part would be fatal for the club for as they faced the mighty FC Barcelona without her man logo Escarré due to fiber breakage and unable to make any changes due to lack of players, the result was 7–2 in favor the Catalans. Escarré enjoyed a permit from the RFEH to delay his trip to Australia with the senior team where he was to play a friendly, to meet in the second-leg match on 5 June 1999 in field hockey of the AU, and that ultimately is expected to be a difficult undertaking to go back five goals to win promotion to the top flight. And so, the game was tied at 2 goals and played Escarré Nor dragged due to injury.

=== 1999–2000 ===
Atletico San Vicente does not appear in any regular competition hockey.

=== 2000–01 ===
The sanvicentero club after a great campaign in Group B of First National staying ahead of FC Barcelona, disputed the final phase of promotion to Division Honor, running out of the rise by just one goal difference on the two teams finally got the promotion (Club de Campo Villa de Madrid and Club Hockey Monteoro Amistad de Madrid).

Such disputed the final phase 20 to April 22 of 2001 in Madrid Somontes facilities, the played the Junior FC, Club Atlético San Vicente, and above Country Club Villa de Madrid and Club Hockey Monteoro Friendship. The San Vicente who managed two wins and one loss, was immersed in a three-way tie with both teams taking locals to use the tie by the total number of goals scored in matches in the final round.

=== 2001–02 ===
The club does not make a good season left in the 4th and last place in Group B in the preliminary round.
