= Bram Lomans =

Dutch field hockey player

Medal record

Men's field hockey

Representing the Netherlands

Olympic Games
Gold medal – first place	1996 Atlanta	Team
Gold medal – first place	2000 Sydney	Team

World Cup
Gold medal – first place	1998 Utrecht	Team

Champions Trophy
Gold medal – first place	2002 Cologne	Team
Gold medal – first place	2003 Amstelveen	Team
Bronze medal – third place	1999 Brisbane	Team

ZOAT
Gold medal – first place	2014 Hong Kong	Team
Bronze medal – third place	2024 Kuala Lumpur (Taai Elephen)	Team

Abraham ("Bram") Robertus Lomans (born 19 April 1975 in Roosendaal) is a former Dutch field hockey player, who twice won the gold medal at the Olympics: in Atlanta (1996 and in Sydney (2000).

He made his debut for the Dutch side on 16 June 1995 in a friendly match against Ireland. Since then the defender has played 201 international matches for Holland, in which he scored 140 goals. Lomans was famous for his penalty corners. He is one of the precursors of the drag flick technique that appeared in the 1990s.

Just before the 2004 Summer Olympics in Athens, he was removed from the team by coach Terry Walsh. Lomans played in the Dutch League for Push and HGC, and stopped at top level in the spring of 2005. He made a comeback for the 2006–07 season in the Dutch League and scored more than 20 goals once again. He was renamed in the national team in June 2007.

In 2014, Lomans, now living in Singapore, reignited his career with the Singapore Dutch, and helped the side seal gold with a 5–0 victory over Hong Kong in the final of the ZOAT at HKFC's Sports Road ground.

Following the disappointment of the 2015 ZOAT, in which the Singapore Dutch finished 9th in Bangkok despite only conceding one goal the entire tournament, Lomans was determined to make amends at the annual 2016 SCC sixes tournament at The Padang. The Dutch came close to a place in the finals but eventually fell to local rivals SRC in the semi-finals, 2–0. As a small measure of consolation, Lomans was named player of the tournament, beating out team-mate Paul Rombeek, who lost out on points for his raucous behaviour on the dance floor.
