= Stephen Davies (field hockey) =

Australian field hockey player

Personal information
- Born: 2 January 1969 (age 57) Parkes, NSW, Australia
Medal record
Men's field hockey
Representing Australia
Olympic Games
Silver medal – second place	1992 Barcelona	Team
Bronze medal – third place	1996 Atlanta	Team
Bronze medal – third place	2000 Sydney	Team
World Cup
Bronze medal – third place	1990 Lahore	Team
Bronze medal – third place	1994 Sydney	Team
Champions Trophy
Gold medal – first place	1993 Kuala Lumpur	Team
Gold medal – first place	1999 Brisbane	Team
Silver medal – second place	1992 Karachi	Team
Silver medal – second place	1995 Berlin	Team
Silver medal – second place	1997 Adelaide	Team
Commonwealth Games
Gold medal – first place	1998 Kuala Lumpur	Team

Stephen John Davies (born 2 January 1969 in Parkes, NSW) is an Australian hockey player who represented his country at three successive Summer Olympic Games, winning a silver medal and two bronze medals. In total he played for the Australia national hockey team 274 times over 10 years and was inducted into the Hockey NSW Hall of Fame in November 2009.
