= Stephan Veen =

Dutch field hockey player

Personal information
- Born: 27 July 1970 (age 55)
Medal record
Men's field hockey
Representing the Netherlands
Olympic Games
Gold medal – first place	1996 Atlanta	Team
Gold medal – first place	2000 Sydney	Team
World Cup
Gold medal – first place	1990 Lahore	Team competition
Gold medal – first place	1998 Utrecht	Team
Champions Trophy
Gold medal – first place	2000 Amstelveen	Team
Bronze medal – third place	1999 Brisbane	Team

Stephan Patrick Veen (born 27 July 1970, in Groningen) is a retired field hockey forward and midfielder from The Netherlands, who twice became olympic champion with the Dutch national squad: in 1996 and in 2000.

Awards
Preceded by None	WorldHockey Player of the Year; 1998	Succeeded by (Australia) Jay Stacy
Preceded by (Australia) Jay Stacy	WorldHockey Player of the Year; 2000	Succeeded by (Germany) Florian Kunz
