= Javier Arnau =

Spanish field hockey player (born 1973)

Personal information
- Full name: Xavier Arnau Creus
- Born: 20 March 1973 (age 53) Terrassa, Spain

Sport
- Sport: Field hockey
- Position: Striker
Senior career
Years	Team	Caps	Goals
–	Atlètic Terrassa	-	-
National team
Years	Team	Caps	Goals
–	Spain		-
Medal record
Men's field hockey
Representing Spain
Olympic Games
Silver medal – second place	1996 Atlanta	Team
World Cup
Silver medal – second place	1998 Utrecht	Team
Champions Trophy
Bronze medal – third place	1997 Adelaide	Team

Xavier ("Xavi") Arnau Creus (born 20 March 1973 in Terrassa, Catalonia) is a former field hockey player from Spain. He won the silver medal with the men's national team at the 1996 Summer Olympics in Atlanta, Georgia. The striker also participated in the 1992 Summer Olympics and the 2000 Summer Olympics.
