= Song Seung-tae =

Korean field hockey player

Personal information
- Born: January 3, 1972 (age 54)

Sport
- Sport: Field Hockey
- Now coaching: Metro Express Barishal

Korean name
- Hangul: 송성태
- RR: Song Seongtae
- MR: Song Sŏngt'ae
Medal record
Men's field hockey
Representing South Korea
Olympic Games
Silver medal – second place	2000 Sydney	Team
Asian Games
Gold medal – first place	2002 Busan	Team
Silver medal – second place	1998 Bangkok	Team
Asia Cup
Gold medal – first place	1999 Kuala Lumpur
Champions Trophy
Silver medal – second place	1999 Brisbane
Bronze medal – third place	2000 Amstelveen

Song Seung-tae (born January 3, 1972) is a retired field hockey striker from South Korea, who was a member of the Men's National Team that won the silver medal at the 2000 Summer Olympics in Sydney. In the final the South Koreans were beaten by the Dutch title holders after penalty strokes.

Song played club hockey in Malaysia with Sapura HC after playing in Germany. His Olympic debut was at the 1996 Summer Olympics in Atlanta and he also competed at the 2004 Summer Olympics in Athens.
