= Maurits Hendriks =

Dutch field hockey coach

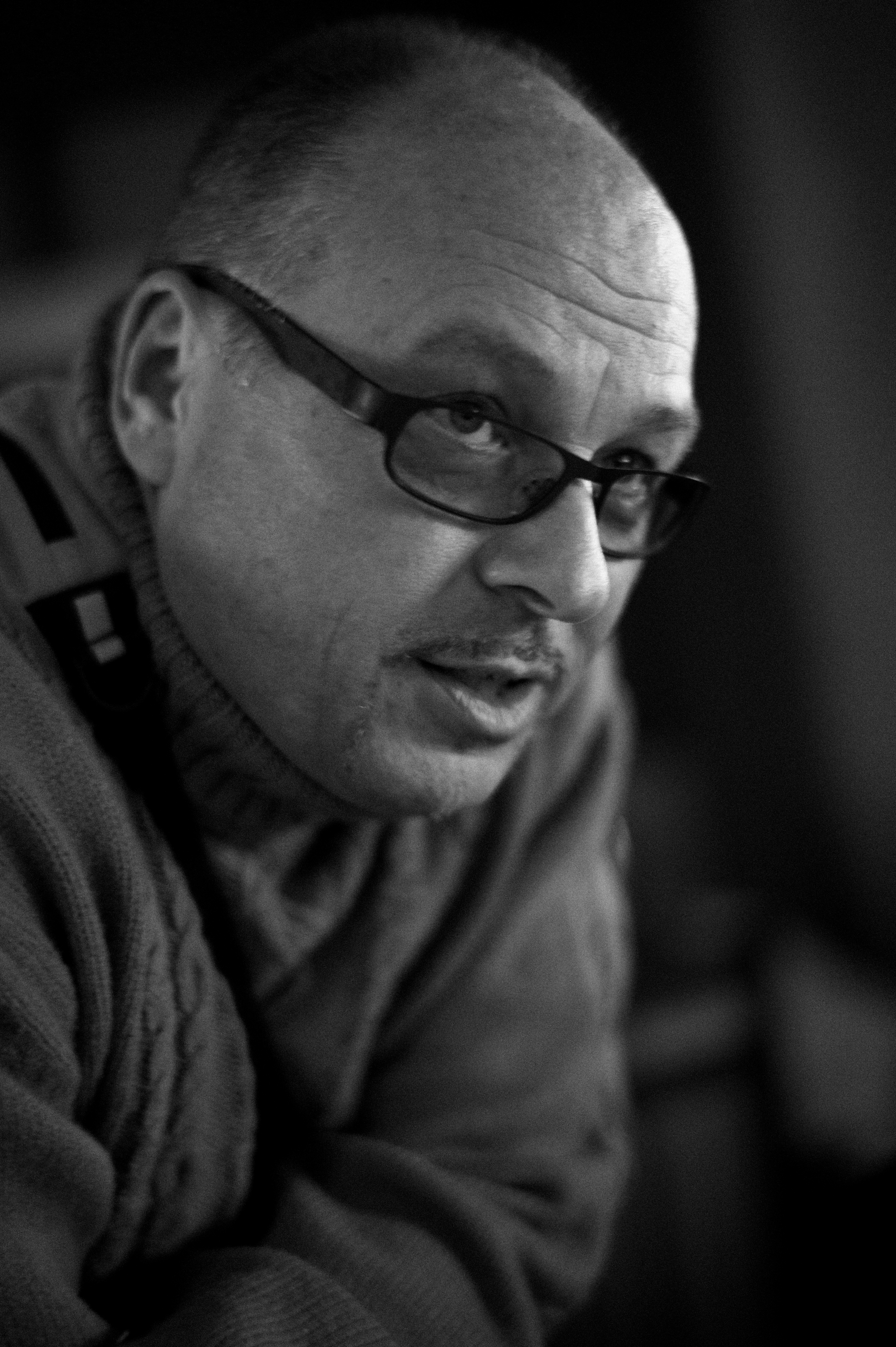
Maurits Hendriks

Maurits Gijsbreght Hendriks (born 1 January 1961 in Amsterdam) is a former field hockey coach from the Netherlands, who himself played as a goalkeeper in the 1980s in Enschede.

Since September 2022 he is working at the Dutch football club Ajax as Chief Sports Officer (CSO).
