= Francisco Fábregas Monegal =

Spanish field hockey player (born 1977)

Personal information
- Born: 14 October 1977 (age 48)
Medal record
Men's field hockey
Representing Spain
Olympic Games
Silver medal – second place	2008 Beijing	Team
World Cup
Silver medal – second place	1998 Utrecht	Team
European Championship
Gold medal – first place	2005 Leipzig	Team
Silver medal – second place	2007 Manchester	Team
Champions Trophy
Gold medal – first place	2004 Lahore	Team
Bronze medal – third place	2005 Chennai	Team
Bronze medal – third place	2006 Terrassa	Team
Champions Challenge
Gold medal – first place	2003 Johannesburg	Team

Francisco ("Kiko") Fábregas Monegal (born 14 October 1977 in Barcelona, Catalonia) is a field hockey midfielder from Spain, who finished in fourth position with the Men's National Team at the 2004 Summer Olympics in Athens, Greece. Four years earlier, in Sydney, he ended up in ninth place with the national side. Fábregas plays club hockey for Real Club de Polo in his hometown of Barcelona.

== Career ==
Kiko Fábregas made his debut for the Spanish national team in 1996. At the 1998 World Cup in Utrecht, Spain finished second in their group behind Australia. A 3–0 victory in the semi-final against Germany saw Spain reach the final, which they lost 3–2 after extra time to the Netherlands. The following year, Spain finished fifth at the 1999 European Championship. At the 2000 Olympic Games in Sydney, Spain finished ninth.

Two years later, the Spanish team also failed to achieve success at the World Championships in Kuala Lumpur, finishing in eleventh place.

At the 2004 Olympic Games in Athens, the Spanish team won their preliminary group ahead of the Germans. After a 3–6 defeat against the Australian team in the semi-final, the Spanish team faced the Germans again in the bronze medal match and lost 3–4 in sudden death overtime with a goal by Björn Michel.
