= James Elmer =

Australian field hockey player (born 1971)

Personal information
- Full name: James Andrew Elmer
- Nickname: Jimmy
- Born: 8 May 1971 (age 55) Melbourne, Victoria
- Height: 176 cm (5 ft 9 in)
- Weight: 53 kg (117 lb)
Medal record
Men's field hockey
Representing Australia
Olympic Games
Bronze medal – third place	2000 Sydney	Team
Champions Trophy
Gold medal – first place	1999 Brisbane	Team
Commonwealth Games
Gold medal – first place	1998 Kuala Lumpur	Team

James Andrew "Jimmy" Elmer (born 8 May 1971 in Melbourne, Victoria) is a former field hockey striker from Australia, who was a member of the team that won the bronze medal at the 2000 Summer Olympics in Sydney

He was nicknamed Jimmy by his teammates. Elmer made his senior debut for The Kookaburras in 1993. He played in every Champions Trophy since 1991, but always missed "the big ones", until the Sydney Games. There he finished his career after 102 international matches, in which he scored 30 goals.

James is currently captain for Doncaster in the Victorian Masters League A grade division. His team suffered a 5–4 loss to the Hawthorn Hockey Club in the 2012 grand final following extra time in a penalty goal shoot-out. James took the 4th of 5 penalties for his team, which was saved by the Hawthorn keeper Corey Blake.
