= Jeon Jong-ha =

Korean field hockey player

- Hangul: 전종하
- RR: Jeon Jongha
- MR: Chŏn Chongha

Jeon Jong-ha
Medal record

Men's field hockey

Representing South Korea

Olympic Games
Silver medal – second place	2000 Sydney	Team

Asian Games
Gold medal – first place	1994 Hiroshima	Team
Gold medal – first place	2002 Busan	Team

Asia Cup
Gold medal – first place	1999 Kuala Lumpur	

Jeon Jong-ha (born 28 February 1973) is a South Korean former field hockey player who competed in the 1996 Summer Olympics, the 2000 Summer Olympics, and the 2004 Summer Olympics.
