= Jordi Casas =

Spanish field hockey player (born 1976)

Personal information
- Born: 20 December 1976 (age 49)
Medal record
Men's field hockey
Representing Spain
World Cup
Silver medal – second place	1998 Utrecht	Team competition

Jordi Casas Gutiérrez (born 20 December 1976) is a former field hockey player from Spain, who finished in ninth position with the Men's National Team at the 2000 Summer Olympics in Sydney, Australia.
