= 1998 Men's Hockey World Cup =

Coordinates: 52°04′42″N 5°08′45″E

1998 Hockey World Cup
Wereldkampioenschap hockey mannen 1998
- Official logo

Tournament details
- Host country: Netherlands
- City: Utrecht
- Dates: 20 June – 1 July
- Teams: 12 (from 4 confederations)
- Venue: Stadion Galgenwaard

Final positions
- Champions: Netherlands (3rd title)
- Runner-up: Spain
- Third place: Germany

Tournament statistics
- Matches played: 42
- Goals scored: 209 (4.98 per match)
- Top scorer: (Australia) Jay Stacy (13 goals)
- Best player: (Germany) Oliver Domke
- Best goalkeeper: (Spain) Ramón Jufresa

The 1998 Men's Hockey World Cup was the ninth edition of the Men's Hockey World Cup, the quadrennial world championship for men's national field hockey teams organized by the International Hockey Federation. It was held alongside the women's tournament in Utrecht, Netherlands from 20 June to 1 July 1998.

The trophy was won by the Netherlands national field hockey team. Spain came second and Germany came third. The Dutch made history by being the only country to win a tournament at its home ground not only once, but twice. It was the second time The Netherlands had hosted the competition.

== Location ==
The 9th Hockey World Cup was held in Galgenwaard Stadium at Utrecht, Netherlands. The stadium was opened in 1982, and was mainly used for football, and was the home of the football club FC Utrecht. The stadium has a capacity of around 24,500 spectators, and at the time it was one of the most modern stadiums in the world. The stadium was the host of two World Cup finals: the first, was the Hockey World Cup final; and the second was in 2005, for the final of the Football World Youth Championships.

== Qualification ==
Date	Event	Location	Quotas	Qualifiers
Host			1	Netherlands
23 November – 4 December 1994	1994 World Cup	Sydney, Australia	5	Pakistan; Australia; Germany; India; England
4–15 March 1997	1997 Intercontinental Cup	Kuala Lumpur, Malaysia	6	Spain; South Korea; New Zealand; Poland; Canada; Malaysia
Total			12	

== Group stage ==
=== Pool A ===
Pos	Team	Pld	W	D	L	GF	GA	GD	Pts	Qualification
1	Germany	5	4	1	0	18	7	+11	13	Semi-finals
2	Netherlands (H)	5	4	0	1	17	10	+7	12	Semi-finals
3	Canada	5	1	3	1	13	12	+1	6	
4	South Korea	5	1	1	3	9	13	−4	4	
5	New Zealand	5	1	1	3	8	12	−4	4	
6	India	5	1	0	4	6	17	−11	3	

Source: FIH
(H) Hosts

21 May 1998
12:35

Germany	4–1	India
Bechmann 4'; Domke 11', 30'; Michel 19'	Report	Sabu 54'

21 May 1998
13:35

South Korea	1–3	New Zealand
Yeo 64'	Report	Hari 5', 46'; Smith 30'

21 May 1998
17:35

Netherlands	3–1	Canada
Van Wijk 24'; Veen 51'; Brinkman 66'	Report	Gacek 45'

Umpires:
Raymond O'Connor (IRE)
Irfan Zaidi (PAK)

22 May 1998
17:35

New Zealand	0–3	Germany
	Report	Domke 1', 58'; Tewes 12'

22 May 1998
18:35

Canada	1–1	South Korea
Short 40'	Report	Kang 46'

Umpires:
Jos Gorissen (NED)
Amarjit Singh (MAS)

22 May 1998
20:05

India	0–5	Netherlands
	Report	Veen 23', 30', 47'; De Nooijer 26'; Van Wijk 63'

24 May 1998
13:35

South Korea	4–3	India
Jeong 5'; Kang 10', 70+'; Song 57'	Report	Tirkey 25'; Sabu 38'; Sameer 42'

Umpires:
Irfan Zaidi (PAK)

24 May 1998
16:05

Netherlands	1–5	Germany
Van Meer 26'	Report	Domke 34', 65'; Tewes 40'; Michel 54'; Mayerhofer 67'

24 May 1998
18:35

New Zealand	3–3	Canada
Robinson 23'; Radovonich 57'; Parag 69'	Report	Gacek 4'; Brahmst 20'; Bird 39'

Umpires:
Henrik Ehlers (DEN)
Donald Prior (AUS)

26 May 1998
16:05

India	1–0	New Zealand
Mukesh 64'	Report

Umpires:
Xavier Adell (ESP)
Eduardo Ruíz (ARG)

26 May 1998
17:35

Canada	4–4	Germany
Short 9', 34'; Milkovich 60'; D'Abreo 68'	Report	Domke 3'; Mayerhofer 33'; Michel 36', 46'

Umpires:
Steven Horgan (USA)
Santiago Deo (ESP)

26 May 1998
20:05

Netherlands	4–2	South Korea
Lomans 44', 58', 60'; Buma 63'	Report	Song 36'; Kang 67'

28 May 1998
12:35

Germany	2–1	South Korea
	Report

28 May 1998
13:35

India	1–4	Canada
Rajesh 21'	Report	Short 24'; Gacek 36'; Milkovich 47'; Gifford 65'

Umpires:
Amarjit Singh (MAS)
Peter Broughton (ENG)

28 May 1998
20:05

New Zealand	2–4	Netherlands
Radovonich 18'; Gill 64'	Report	De Nooijer 11', 41'; Lomans 26', 30'

=== Pool B ===
Pos	Team	Pld	W	D	L	GF	GA	GD	Pts	Qualification
1	Australia	5	4	1	0	24	3	+21	13	Semi-finals
2	Spain	5	4	1	0	14	4	+10	13	Semi-finals
3	Pakistan	5	3	0	2	19	13	+6	9	
4	England	5	2	0	3	14	16	−2	6	
5	Poland	5	0	1	4	4	21	−17	1	
6	Malaysia	5	0	1	4	4	22	−18	1	

Source: FIH

21 May 1998
10:05

Poland	0–8	Australia
	Report	Smith 7'; Brennan 23'; Choppy 29', 66'; Stacy 35+', 68'; Lewis 54'; Davies 57'

21 May 1998
11:05

Malaysia	2–7	Pakistan
Nasir-ud-Din 57', 64'	Report	Khan 9'; Shahbaz Jr. 15'; Ahmed 28'; Abbas 33'; Zaman 41'; Ashraf 49'; Bashir 62'

21 May 1998
20:05

Spain	3–1	England
Pujol 10'; Sánchez 40'; Usoz 58'	Report	Giles 69'

23 May 1998
13:05

Pakistan	7–5	England
Bashir 5', 19'; Ashraf 17'; Ahmed 34', 63'; Shahbaz Jr. 44'; Khan 62'	Report	Garcia 10'; Giles 27'; Pearn 39'; Wyatt 55', 59'

Umpires:
Peter von Reth (NED)
Jos Gorissen (NED)

23 May 1998
14:35

Poland	1–1	Malaysia
Grzeszczak 7'	Report	Shankar 20'

23 May 1998
18:35

Australia	2–2	Spain
Stacy 27', 52'	Report	Arnau 12'; Pujol 29'

25 May 1998
15:05

Malaysia	0–8	Australia
	Report	Stacy 13', 40', 51', 58'; Davies 38', 55'; Lewis 61'; Brennan 64'

Umpires:
Peter Broughton (ENG)
Jos Gorissen (NED)

25 May 1998
17:35

Pakistan	1–2	Spain
Abbas 39'	Report	Fábregas 35'; Arnau 42'

Umpires:
Eric Denis (BEL)
Sumesh Putra (CAN)

25 May 1998
18:35

England	5–2	Poland
Lee 19'; Garcia 24'; Wyatt 45'; Pearn 48'; Giles 52'	Report	Grotowski 9'; Łukaszewski 60'

Umpires:
Raymond O'Connor (IRE)
Amarjit Singh (MAS)

27 May 1998
10:05

Pakistan	3–1	Poland
Bashir 11'; Ashraf 17', 67'	Report	Grotowski 38'

Umpires:
Richard Wolter (GER)
Eduardo Ruíz (ARG)

27 May 1998
12:35

Spain	3–0	Malaysia
Escarré 13'; Casas 24'; Arnau 66'	Report

Umpires:
Peter von Reth (NED)
Jos Gorissen (NED)

27 May 1998
15:05

Australia	3–0	England
Brennan 25'; Stacy 34', 47'	Report

Umpires:
Christian Siebrecht (GER)
Hendrik Ehlers (DEN)

28 May 1998
15:05

England	3–1	Malaysia
Giles 17'; Lee 53'; Pearn 62'	Report	Nasir-ud-Din 24'

Umpires:
Christian Manfred (GER)
Irfan Zaidi (PAK)

28 May 1998
16:05

Spain	4–0	Poland
Arnau 2'; Malgosa 3'; Escarré 24'; Usoz 41'	Report

Umpires:
Hendrik Ehlers (DEN)
Sumesh Putra (CAN)

28 May 1998
17:35

Australia	3–1	Pakistan
Stacy 9', 31'; Brennan 31'	Report	Bashir 62'

Umpires:
Peter von Reth (NED)
Richard Wolter (GER)

== Classification round ==
=== Ninth to twelfth place classification ===
Crossover
30 May
New Zealand	3
Malaysia	2
30 May
India	6
Poland	2

Ninth place
1 June
India	1
New Zealand	0
Eleventh place
31 May
Malaysia	5
Poland	4

==== Ninth to twelfth qualifiers ====
30 May 1998
10:05

New Zealand	3–2	Malaysia
Parag 14'; Radovonich 18'; Towns 53'	Report	Kaliswaran 12'; Mirnawan 40'

Umpires:
Sumesh Putra (CAN)
Steven Horgan (USA).

30 May 1998
12:35

India	6–2	Poland
Mukesh 25', 55', 69'; Dhanraj 27'; Rajesh 53', 66'	Report	Łukaszewski 35'; Jakubiak 56'

Umpires:
Eric Denis (BEL)
Christian Sibrecht (GER)

==== Eleventh and twelfth place ====
31 May 1998
10:05

Malaysia	5–4	Poland
Mirnawan 15', 36'; Kuhan 35+', 59'; Nasir-ud-Din 70'	Report	Matuszynski 10'; Grotowski 19'; Łukaszewski 23', 54'

Umpires:
Irfan Zaidi (PAK)
Hendrik Ehlers (DEN)

==== Ninth and tenth place ====
1 June 1998
10:05

India	1–0	New Zealand
Riaz 37'	Report

Umpires:
Raymond O'Connor (IRL)
Amarijt Singh (MAS)

=== Fifth to eighth place classification ===
Crossover
30 May
South Korea	1
Pakistan	3
30 May
Canada	1
England	2

Fifth place
1 June
Pakistan	4
England	2
Seventh place
1 June
South Korea	4
Canada	2

==== Fifth to eighth qualifiers ====
30 May 1998
11:05

Canada	1–2	England
Griffiths 45'	Report	Giles 43', 68'

Umpires:
Jos Gorissen (NED)
Hendrik Ehlers (DEN)

30 May 1998
13:35

South Korea	1–3	Pakistan
Hong 70'	Report	Ashraf 18', 47'; Shahbaz Jr. 53'

==== Seventh and eighth place ====
1 June 1998
12:35

South Korea	4–2	Canada
Song 14', 49', 59', 63'	Report	Brahmst 15'; Bird 66'

Umpires:
Christian Siebrecht (GER)
Peter Broughton (ENG)

==== Fifth and sixth place ====
1 June 1998
11:05

Pakistan	4–2	England
Usman 10', 14'; Bashir 11', 33'	Report	Garcia 47'; Giles 56'

Umpires:
Jos Gorissen (NED)
Steven Horgan (USA)

=== First to fourth place classification ===
Semi-finals
30 May
Germany	0
Spain	3
30 May
Australia	2
Netherlands	6

Final
1 June
Spain	2
Netherlands (a.e.t.)	3
Third place
1 June
Germany	1
Australia	0

==== Semi-finals ====
30 May 1998
16:05

Australia	2–6	Netherlands
Stacy 13'; Davies 56'	Report	Van Meer 6'; Lomans 39', 42', 61'; Van Wijk 60'; De Nooijer 69'

Umpires:
Eduardo Ruíz (ARG)
Santiago Deo (ESP)

30 May 1998
18:35

Germany	0–3	Spain
	Report	Sánchez 32'; Arnau 64'; Escarré 70'

Umpires:
Peter von Reth (NED)
Donald Prior (AUS)

==== Third and fourth place ====
1 June 1998
13:05

Germany	1–0	Australia
Michel 26'	Report

==== Final ====
1 June 1998
16:05

Spain	2–3 (a.e.t.)	Netherlands
Arnau 18'; Pujol 55'	Report	Veen 54'; Lomans 60'; De Nooijer 83'

Attendance: 15,000
Umpires:
Richard Wolter (GER)
Donald Prior (AUS)

== Awards ==
Player of the Tournament	Top Goalscorer	Goalkeeper of the Tournament	Most Sportive Player	Fair Play Trophy
(Germany) Oliver Domke	(Australia) Jay Stacy	(Spain) Ramón Jufresa	(Pakistan) Shahbaz Ahmad	Germany

== Final standings ==
Pos	Grp	Team	Pld	W	D	L	GF	GA	GD	Pts	Final result
1	A	Netherlands (H)	7	6	0	1	26	14	+12	18	Gold medal
2	B	Spain	7	5	1	1	19	7	+12	16	Silver medal
3	A	Germany	7	5	1	1	19	10	+9	16	Bronze medal
4	B	Australia	7	4	1	2	26	10	+16	13	Fourth place
5	B	Pakistan	7	5	0	2	26	16	+10	15	Eliminated in group stage
6	B	England	7	3	0	4	18	21	−3	9	Eliminated in group stage
7	A	South Korea	7	2	1	4	14	18	−4	7	Eliminated in group stage
8	A	Canada	7	1	3	3	16	18	−2	6	Eliminated in group stage
9	A	India	7	3	0	4	13	19	−6	9	Eliminated in group stage
10	A	New Zealand	7	2	1	4	11	15	−4	7	Eliminated in group stage
11	B	Malaysia	7	1	1	5	11	29	−18	4	Eliminated in group stage
12	B	Poland	7	0	1	6	10	32	−22	1	Eliminated in group stage

Source: FIH
(H) Hosts

== Goalscorers ==
- Note: Scorers from the Pool A match between Germany and South Korea are unknown, and hence have not been added to this list.

There were 209 goals scored in 42 matches, for an average of 4.98 goals per match.

13 goals

- (Australia) Jay Stacy

9 goals

- (Netherlands) Bram Lomans

7 goals

- (England) Calum Giles
- (Germany) Oliver Domke
- (Pakistan) Atif Bashir

6 goals

- (Pakistan) Kamran Ashraf
- (South Korea) Song Seung-tae
- (Spain) Javier Arnau

5 goals

- (Germany) Björn Michel
- (Netherlands) Teun de Nooijer
- (Netherlands) Stephan Veen

4 goals

- (Australia) Michael Brennan
- (Australia) Stephen Davies
- (Canada) Robert Short
- (India) Mukesh Kumar
- (Malaysia) Nor Saiful Zaini Nasir-ud-Din
- (Poland) Sławomir Łukaszewski
- (South Korea) Kang Keon-wook

3 goals

- (Canada) Marek Gacek
- (England) Russell Garcia
- (England) Mark Pearn
- (England) Jonathan Wyatt
- (India) Rajesh Chauhan
- (Malaysia) Mirnawan Nawawi
- (Netherlands) Remco van Wijk
- (New Zealand) Jonathan Radovonich
- (Pakistan) Shahbaz Ahmed
- (Pakistan) Muhammad Shahbaz
- (Poland) Rafał Grotowski
- (Spain) Juan Escarré
- (Spain) Victor Pujol

2 goals

- (Australia) Baeden Choppy
- (Australia) Paul Lewis
- (Canada) Ian Bird
- (Canada) Alan Brahmst
- (Canada) Peter Milkovich
- (England) Jason Lee
- (Germany) Jan-Peter Tewes
- (Germany) Christian Mayerhofer
- (India) Sabu Varkey
- (Malaysia) Kuhan Shanmuganathan
- (Netherlands) Tycho van Meer
- (New Zealand) Bevan Hari
- (New Zealand) Umesh Parag
- (Pakistan) Sohail Abbas
- (Pakistan) Rahim Khan
- (Pakistan) Muhammad Usman
- (Spain) Josep Sánchez
- (Spain) Pablo Usoz

1 goal

- (Australia) Matthew Smith
- (Canada) Robin D'Abreo
- (Canada) Christopher Gifford
- (Canada) Andrew Griffiths
- (Germany) Christoph Bechmann
- (India) Sameer Dad
- (India) Dhanraj Pillay
- (India) Mohammed Riaz
- (India) Dilip Tirkey
- (Malaysia) Kaliswaran Muniandy
- (Malaysia) Shankar Ramu
- (Netherlands) Jacques Brinkman
- (Netherlands) Jaap-Derk Buma
- (New Zealand) Hymie Gill
- (New Zealand) Kenneth Robinson
- (New Zealand) Darren Smith
- (New Zealand) Simon Towns
- (Pakistan) Tahir Zaman
- (Poland) Robert Grzeszczak
- (Poland) Paweł Jakubiak
- (Poland) Maciej Matuszynski
- (South Korea) Hong Gyeong-seop
- (South Korea) Jeong Yong-gyun
- (South Korea) Yeo Woon-kon
- (Spain) Jordi Casas
- (Spain) Francisco Fábregas Monegal
- (Spain) Joaquim Malgosa

== See also ==
- 1998 Men's Hockey Champions Trophy
- 1998 Women's Hockey World Cup
