= Josep Sánchez =

Spanish field hockey player (born 1976)

Personal information
- Full name: Josep Sánchez Galobardes
- Born: 8 June 1976 (age 50) Terrassa, Spain

Sport
- Sport: Field hockey
- Position: Midfielder
National team
Years	Team	Caps	Goals
–	Spain		-
Medal record
Men's field hockey
Representing Spain
World Cup
Silver medal – second place	1998 Utrecht	Team
Champions Trophy
Bronze medal – third place	1997 Adelaide	Team
Champions Challenge
Gold medal – first place	2003 Johannesburg	Team

Josep "Pep" Sánchez Galobardes (Note: In this Spanish name, the first or paternal surname is Sánchez and the second or maternal family name is Galobardes.) (born 8 June 1976) is a former field hockey midfielder from Spain. He represented the men's national team at two consecutive Summer Olympics, starting in 2000.
