= Michael Brennan (field hockey) =

Australian field hockey player

Medal record

Men's field hockey

Representing Australia

Olympic Games
Gold medal – first place	2004 Athens	Team
Bronze medal – third place	2000 Sydney	Team

Champions Trophy
Gold medal – first place	1999 Brisbane	Team
Bronze medal – third place	1997 Adelaide	Team

Commonwealth Games
Gold medal – first place	1998 Kuala Lumpur	Team

Michael Gene Brennan OAM (born 15 October 1975 in Toowoomba, Queensland) is a field hockey midfielder from Australia, who was a member of the team that won gold at the 2004 Summer Olympics in Athens. Four years earlier, when Sydney hosted the Summer Games, he finished in third spot with The Kookaburras , as the men's national team is called. Michael Brennan has since gone on to become a multiple Group 1 winning horse trainer.

In December 2023 Michael Brennan joined an elite group of athletes joining the Australian Hockey Hall Of Fame.
