= Jay Stacy =

Australian field hockey player

Personal information
- Full name: Jay Jason Stacy
- Born: 9 August 1968 (age 57) Melbourne, Victoria
- Height: 184 cm (6 ft 0 in)
- Weight: 90 kg (198 lb)
- Children: Max Stacy, Reed Stacy
Medal record
Men's field hockey
Representing Australia
Olympic Games
| Silver medal – second place | 1992 Barcelona | Team |
| Bronze medal – third place | 1996 Atlanta | Team |
| Bronze medal – third place | 2000 Sydney | Team |
Champions Trophy
| Gold medal – first place | 1999 Brisbane | Team |
Commonwealth Games
| Gold medal – first place | 1998 Kuala Lumpur | Team |

Jay Jason Stacy (born 9 August 1968 in Melbourne, Victoria) is a former field hockey midfielder from Australia, who participated in four Summer Olympics for his native country, starting in 1988.

Awards
| Preceded by (Netherlands) Stephan Veen | FIH Player of the Year; 1999 | Succeeded by (Netherlands) Stephan Veen |
