= Kang Keon-wook =

South Korean field hockey player

Medal record

Men's field hockey

Representing South Korea

Olympic Games
Silver medal – second place	2000 Sydney	Team

Asian Games
Gold medal – first place	1994 Hiroshima	Team
Gold medal – first place	2002 Busan	Team
Silver medal – second place	1998 Bangkok	Team

Kang Keon-Wook (born 21 May 1971) is a South Korean field hockey coach and former field hockey player who competed in the 1996 Summer Olympics and in the 2000 Summer Olympics.
