= 1999 Men's EuroHockey Nations Championship =

Tournament details
- Host country: Italy
- City: Padua
- Dates: 1–12 September
- Teams: 12 (from 1 confederation)

Final positions
- Champions: Germany (5th title)
- Runner-up: Netherlands
- Third place: England

Tournament statistics
- Matches played: 42
- Goals scored: 225 (5.36 per match)
- Top scorer: (Netherlands) Bram Lomans (12 goals)

The 1999 Men's EuroHockey Nations Championship was the eighth edition of the Men's EuroHockey Nations Championship, the quadrennial international men's field hockey championship of Europe organized by the European Hockey Federation. It was held in Padua, Italy from 1 to 12 September 1999.

The two-time defending champions Germany won a record-extending fifth title by defeating the Netherlands 8–7 in penalty strokes after the match finished 3–3 after extra time. England won the bronze medal by defeating Belgium 7–2.

== Qualified teams ==
Dates	Event	Location	Quotas	Qualifier(s)
—N/a	Host	—N/a	1	Italy
16–27 August 1995	1995 European Championship	Dublin, Ireland	6	Belgium; England; Germany; Ireland; Netherlands; Poland
6–11 July 1998	1999 European Championship qualification	Dundee, Scotland	2	Russia; Switzerland
6–12 July 1998	1999 European Championship qualification	Alicante, Spain	2	France; Spain
9–12 July 1998	1999 European Championship qualification	Prague, Czech Republic	1	Wales
Total			12	

== Preliminary round ==
=== Pool A ===
Pos	Team	Pld	W	D	L	GF	GA	GD	Pts	Qualification
1	Netherlands	5	4	1	0	22	5	+17	13	Semi-finals
2	England	5	4	1	0	20	5	+15	13	Semi-finals
3	Russia	5	3	0	2	14	19	−5	9	
4	France	5	2	0	3	10	17	−7	6	
5	Poland	5	1	0	4	10	17	−7	3	
6	Ireland	5	0	0	5	5	18	−13	0	

Source: TheSports.org

1 September 1999
09:30

Ireland	2–3	France

1 September 1999
12:00

Netherlands	4–1	Poland

1 September 1999
17:00

England	7–1	Russia

2 September 1999
14:30

Ireland	0–5	Netherlands

2 September 1999
17:30

France	1–4	England

3 September 1999
09:30

Russia	4–3	Poland

4 September 1999
12:00

Ireland	0–3	England

4 September 1999
14:30

France	5–4	Poland

4 September 1999
17:00

Russia	1–6	Netherlands

6 September 1999
09:30

Poland	0–3	England

6 September 1999
12:00

Ireland	2–5	Russia

6 September 1999
14:30

Netherlands	4–0	France

7 September 1999
12:00

Poland	2–1	Ireland

7 September 1999
17:00

Netherlands	3–3	England

8 September 1999
09:30

Russia	3–1	France

=== Pool B ===
Pos	Team	Pld	W	D	L	GF	GA	GD	Pts	Qualification
1	Germany	5	4	1	0	23	5	+18	13	Semi-finals
2	Belgium	5	4	0	1	16	14	+2	12	Semi-finals
3	Spain	5	3	1	1	16	7	+9	10	
4	Wales	5	1	1	3	10	15	−5	4	
5	Switzerland	5	1	1	3	9	14	−5	4	
6	Italy (H)	5	0	0	5	5	24	−19	0	

Source: TheSports.org
(H) Hosts

1 September 1999
14:30

Italy	0–6	Germany

2 September 1999
09:30

Switzerland	2–2	Wales

2 September 1999
12:00

Spain	3–5	Belgium

3 September 1999
12:00

Wales	0–1	Belgium

3 September 1999
14:30

Switzerland	2–1	Italy

3 September 1999
17:00

Germany	0–0	Spain

5 September 1999
12:00

Germany	5–2	Switzerland

5 September 1999
14:30

Italy	2–3	Belgium

5 September 1999
17:00

Spain	5–1	Wales

6 September 1999
17:00

Germany	6–2	Belgium

7 September 1999
09:30

Switzerland	0–1	Spain

7 September 1999
14:30

Italy	1–6	Wales

8 September 1999
12:00

Belgium	5–3	Switzerland

8 September 1999
17:00

Italy	1–7	Spain

8 September 1999
17:00

Germany	6–1	Wales

== Classification round ==
=== Ninth to twelfth place classification ===
9–12th place semi-finals
11 September
Switzerland	2
Ireland	1
11 September
Poland	5
Italy	1

Ninth place
12 September
Switzerland	2
Poland	6
Eleventh place
12 September
Ireland	2
Italy	1

==== 9–12th place semi-finals ====
11 September 1999
09:00

Poland	5–1	Italy

11 September 1999
11:30

Switzerland	2–1	Ireland

==== Eleventh place game ====
12 September 1999
09:00

Ireland	2–1	Italy

==== Ninth place game ====
12 September 1999
11:30

Switzerland	2–6	Poland

=== Fifth to eighth place classification ===
5–8th place semi-finals
10 September
Spain	3
France	0
10 September
Russia	3
Wales (a.e.t.)	4

Fifth place
11 September
Spain	3
Wales	0
Seventh place
11 September
France	4
Russia	1

==== 5–8th place semi-finals ====
10 September 1999
09:00

Russia	3–4 (a.e.t.)	Wales

10 September 1999
11:30

Spain	3–0	France

==== Seventh place game ====
11 September 1999
14:00

France	4–1	Russia

==== Fifth place game ====
11 September 1999
16:30

Spain	3–0	Wales

=== First to fourth place classification ===
Semi-finals
10 September
Germany	4
England	0
10 September
Netherlands	7
Belgium	1

Final
12 September
Germany (p.s.o.)	3 (5)
Netherlands	3 (4)
Third place
12 September
England	7
Belgium	2

==== Semi-finals ====
10 September 1999
14:00

Netherlands	7–1	Belgium

10 September 1999
16:30

Germany	4–0	England

==== Third place game ====
12 September 1999
14:00

England	7–2	Belgium

==== Final ====
12 September 1999
16:30

Germany	3–3 (a.e.t.)	Netherlands
Penalties
	5–4

== Final standings ==
1. Germany
2. Netherlands
3. England
4. Belgium
5. Spain
6. Wales
7. France
8. Russia
9. Poland
10. Switzerland
11. Ireland
12. Italy

=== Awards ===
- Best Player of the Tournament: (Germany) Christian Mayerhofer
- Best goalkeeper of the Tournament: (Wales) Chris Ashcroft
- Topscorer of the Tournament: (Netherlands) Bram Lomans

== See also ==
- 1999 Women's EuroHockey Nations Championship
