= 2006 Men's Hockey World Cup squads =

Hockey

This article lists the confirmed squads lists for 2006 Men's Hockey World Cup between September 6 to September 17, 2006.

== Pool A ==
=== Argentina ===
Head coach: Sergio Vigil

No.	Player	Pos.	Age
1	Juan Manuel Vivaldi	GK	27
2	Juan Pablo Hourquebie		30
3	Juan Martin Lopez		21
4	Matias Vila		27
5	Ezequiel Paulón		30
6	Mariano Chao	GK	34
7	Mario Almada		31
9	Rodrigo Vila		24
11	Lucas Cammareri		25

No.	Player	Pos.	Age
12	Marcos Riccardi		24
15	Germán Orozco (c)		31
16	Fernando Oscaris		26
17	Matias Paredes		24
19	Matias Cammareri		27
20	Tomás Argento		19
21	Lucas Vila		20
22	Matias Rey		21
26	Pedro Ibarra		20

=== Australia ===
Head coach: Barry Dancer

No.	Player	Pos.	Age
1	Jamie Dwyer		27
2	Liam de Young		24
3	Michael Boyce		26
4	Michael McCann		28
5	Troy Elder		28
6	Robert Hammond		25
7	Nathan Eglington		25
9	Mark Knowles		22
10	Russell Ford		23

No.	Player	Pos.	Age
13	Luke Doerner		27
15	Bevan George		29
18	Stephen Lambert	GK	26
20	Matt Naylor		23
21	Aaron Hopkins		26
24	Travis Brooks		26
25	Brent Livermore (c)		30
26	Dean Butler		29
30	Stephen Mowlam	GK	29

=== Japan ===
Head coach: Akira Takahashi

No.	Player	Pos.	Age
1	Hirofumi Miyoshi	GK	29
2	Shunsuke Nagaoka	GK	25
3	Kazuo Yoshida		28
4	Mitsuru Ito		27
5	Yutaka Bito		25
7	Kei Kawakami		22
8	Kenichi Katayama		30
9	Kazuyuki Ozawa (c)		27
10	Kazuhiro Tsubouchi		24

No.	Player	Pos.	Age
12	Takahiko Yamabori		32
14	Toshiaki Fukuda		26
15	Akira Ito		25
16	Yasuaki Nishimura		23
17	Yuji Chaki		25
19	Takayasu Mizawa		19
21	Yoshihiro Anai		18
22	Hiroko Sakamoto		19
23	Naohiko Tobita		29

=== New Zealand ===
Head coach: Kevin Towns

No.	Player	Pos.	Age
2	Mitesh Patel		30
6	Simon Child		18
7	Blair Hopping		26
8	Dean Couzins		25
10	Ryan Archibald (c)		26
12	Bradley Shaw		23
14	Bevan Hari		31
16	Paul Woolford	GK	29
17	Kyle Pontifex	GK	26

No.	Player	Pos.	Age
18	Phil Burrows		26
19	Hayden Shaw		26
20	James Nation		29
21	Bryce Collins		28
22	Lloyd Stephenson		25
24	Gareth Brooks		27
25	Shea McAleese		22
28	Richard Petherick		20
30	Ben Collier		22

=== Pakistan ===
Head coach: Nasir Ali

No.	Player	Pos.	Age
1	Rehan Butt		26
2	Ihsan Ullah		22
4	Ghanzafar Ali		25
5	Muhammad Saqlain (c)		28
7	Dilawar Hussain		27
8	Adnan Maqsood		27
9	Sohail Abbas		29
10	Salman Akbar	GK	24
11	Muhammad Shabbir		28

No.	Player	Pos.	Age
12	Nasir Ahmad	GK	21
15	Shakeel Abbasi		22
16	Muhammad Zubair		17
17	Akhtar Ali		20
19	Muhammad Imran		27
20	Waseem Ahmed		29
22	Zeeshan Ashraf		29
23	Waqas Akbar		17
31	Adnan Zakir		19

=== Spain ===
Head coach: Maurits Hendriks

No.	Player	Pos.	Age
1	Bernardino Herrera	GK	28
2	Santi Freixa		23
4	Oriol Freixa		27
5	Francisco Fábregas Monegal (c)		28
6	Franc Dinares		18
8	Alex Fàbregas		25
9	Pablo Amat		28
10	Eduardo Tubau		25
12	Juan Fernandez		21

No.	Player	Pos.	Age
13	Ramón Alegre		25
15	Víctor Sojo		22
16	Xavier Ribas		30
17	Albert Sala		25
18	Rodrigo Garza		26
19	Pau Quemada		23
20	Sergi Enrique		18
22	Francisco Cortés	GK	23
23	David Alegre		22

== Pool B ==
=== England ===
Head coach: Jason Lee

No.	Player	Pos.	Age
3	Nick Brothers	GK	23
4	Glenn Kirkham		23
5	Richard Alexander		24
6	Richard Mantell		25
7	Jerome Goudie		29
8	Simon Mantell		22
9	Martin Jones		25
10	Matt Daly		23
11	Brett Garrard		30

No.	Player	Pos.	Age
12	Jonty Clarke		25
13	Rob Moore		25
14	Ben Hawes		26
15	Scott Cordon		26
17	Alistair Wilson		22
18	Barry Middleton		22
20	James Tindall		23
21	Jon Bleby		26
25	James Fair	GK	25

=== Germany ===
Head coach: Bernhard Peters

No.	Player	Pos.	Age
1	Christian Schulte	GK	31
2	Ulrich Bubolz	GK	25
4	Philipp Crone		29
5	Sebastian Biederlack		24
6	Eike Duckwitz		26
7	Carlos Nevado		23
9	Moritz Fürste		21
10	Jan Marco Montag		23
11	Björn Emmerling		30

No.	Player	Pos.	Age
13	Justus Scharowsky		26
14	Tibor Weißenborn		25
16	Niklas Meinert		25
17	Timo Weß (c)		24
19	Christopher Zeller		21
22	Matthias Witthaus		23
25	Philipp Zeller		23
26	Oliver Hentschel		25
29	Sebastian Draguhn		22

=== India ===
Head coach: Vasudevan Baskaran

No.	Player	Pos.	Age
1	Bharat Chettri	GK	24
2	Dilip Tirkey (c)		28
3	Kanwalpreet Singh		24
4	V. R. Raghunath		18
6	Prabodh Tirkey		21
9	Gagan Ajit Singh		23
10	Tejbir Singh		23
11	Nitin Kumar		22
12	Adrian D'Souza	GK	22

No.	Player	Pos.	Age
15	Rajpal Singh		23
16	Shivendra Singh		23
18	Viren Rasquinha		25
19	Gowdalli Hariprasad		20
21	Vinaya Vakkaliga Swamy		20
22	Ignace Tirkey		25
23	Arjun Halappa		26
27	Vikram Pillay		24
28	Tushar Khandker		21

=== Korea ===
Head coach: Cho Sang-Jun

No.	Player	Pos.	Age
1	Ko Dong-Sik	GK	32
2	Lee Seung-il		23
3	Kim Chul		26
5	Kim Yong-Bae (c)		32
6	Lee Nam-Yong		22
7	Seo Jong-Ho		26
8	Kang Seong-Jung		28
9	Yoon Sung-Hoon		23
10	You Hyo-Sik		24

No.	Player	Pos.	Age
11	Lee Jung-Seon		30
13	Yeo Chang-Yong		21
14	Lee Sung-Min		22
15	Cha Jong-Bok		26
16	Lee Myung-Ho	GK	26
17	Hong Eun-Seong		23
18	Hong Sung-Kweon		22
19	Yeo Woon-Kon		32
25	Jang Jong-Hyun		22

=== Netherlands ===
Head coach: Roelant Oltmans

No.	Player	Pos.	Age
1	Guus Vogels	GK	31
3	Geert-Jan Derikx	DF	25
4	Karel Klaver	FW	27
7	Sander van der Weide	DF	30
8	Ronald Brouwer	FW	27
9	Roderick Weusthof	FW	24
10	Taeke Taekema	DF	26
12	Jeroen Delmee (c)	MF	33
13	Klaas Veering	GK	24

No.	Player	Pos.	Age
14	Teun de Nooijer	MF	30
15	Eby Kessing	MF	22
16	Floris Evers	MF	23
18	Rob Reckers	FW	25
19	Matthijs Brouwer	FW	26
20	Jesse Mahieu	DF	28
23	Timme Hoyng	MF	30
24	Robert van der Horst	DF	21
27	Rogier Hofman	FW	20

=== South Africa ===
No.	Player	Pos.	Age
1	Andrew Cronje		22
2	Lloyd Norris-Jones		20
3	Ken Forbes		28
5	Justin Reid-Ross		20
6	Bruce Jacobs (c)		31
7	Wayne Madsen		22
8	Brett Tucker		27
10	Tommy Hammond		21
11	Clyde Abrahams		27

No.	Player	Pos.	Age
14	Eric Rose-Innes		25
15	Brenden Botes	GK	23
16	Marvin Bam		28
17	Geoff Abbott		21
18	Thornton McDade		25
19	Chris Hibbert	GK	30
21	Lungile Tsolekile		22
22	Ian Symons		26
26	Denzil Dolley		29
