= 2007 Men's EuroHockey Nations Championship squads =

This article listed the confirmed squads lists for 2007 Men's EuroHockey Nations Championship between August 19 to August 26, 2007.

== Pool A ==
=== Germany ===
Head coach: Markus Weise

No.	Player	Pos.	Age
1	Ulrich Bubolz	GK	26
2	Christian Schulte	GK	31
3	Philip Witte		23
4	Maximillian Müller		20
5	Sebastian Biederlack		25
7	Carlos Nevado		24
9	Moritz Furste		22
10	Jan Marco Montag		24
11	Sebastian Draguhn		23

No.	Player	Pos.	Age
13	Justus Scharowsky		27
14	Tibor Weissenborn		26
15	Benjamin Wess		22
16	Niklas Meinert		26
17	Timo Wess (C)		25
19	Christopher Zeller		22
22	Matthais Witthaus		24
25	Philipp Zeller		24
32	Tobias Hauke		19

=== England ===
Head coach: Jason Lee

No.	Player	Pos.	Age
3	Nick Brothers	GK	23
4	Glenn Kirkham (C)		24
5	Richard Alexander		25
6	Richard Mantell		25
7	Ashley Jackson		19
8	Simon Mantell		23
9	Martin Jones		26
10	Matt Daly		23
11	Brett Garrard		30

No.	Player	Pos.	Age
12	Jonty Clarke		26
13	Rob Moore		26
15	Scott Cordon		27
17	Alistair Wilson		23
18	Barry Middleton		23
20	James Tindall		24
21	Jon Bleby		27
24	Ben Marsden		27
25	James Fair	GK	26

=== Belgium ===
Head coach: Adam Commens

No.	Player	Pos.	Age
1	Cédric Degreve	GK	28
2	Xavier Reckinger		23
3	Jérôme Dekeyser		23
6	Loic Vandeweghe		23
8	Thomas Van Den Balck (C)		24
9	Maxime Luyckx		24
11	Charles Vandereghe		24
13	Gilles Petre		27
14	Philippe Goldberg		28

No.	Player	Pos.	Age
15	Grégory Gucassoff		22
17	Thomas Briels		19
18	Patrice Houssein		29
21	David Van Rysselberghe	GK	20
23	Alexandre De Saedeleer		19
24	John-John Dohmen		19
26	Benjamin Van Hove		26
27	Amaury De Cock		26
28	Jérôme Truyens		20

=== Czech Republic ===
Head coach: Gino Schilders

No.	Player	Pos.	Age
1	Filip Neusser (C)	GK	25
2	Filip Jaroš		27
3	Vojtěch Sládek		25
4	Pavel Barta		32
5	Tomáš Procházka		23
7	Stepan Bernatek		26
8	Ondrej Vudmaska		22
9	Ladislav Cech		25
10	Jakub Kyndl		21

No.	Player	Pos.	Age
11	Daniel Piterak		20
12	Roman Marik		33
13	Richard Kotrc		33
15	Ales Perinka		28
16	Tomas Hanus	GK	23
17	Martin Hanus		20
18	Martin Babicky		18
19	Martin Toms		24
20	Ondrej Turek		20

== Pool B ==
=== Spain ===
Head coach: Maurits Hendriks

No.	Player	Pos.	Age
1	Bernardino Herrera	GK	29
5	Francisco Fábregas Monegal		29
6	Franc Dinares		19
8	Alex Fábregas		26
9	Pablo Amat		29
10	Eduardo Tubau		26
12	Juan Fernández		22
13	Ramón Alegre		26
14	Juan Lainz		22

No.	Player	Pos.	Age
15	Víctor Sojo		23
16	Xavier Ribas		31
17	Albert Sala		26
18	Rodrigo Garza		27
20	Sergi Enrique		19
21	Eduard Arbos		24
22	Francisco Cortes	GK	24
23	David Alegre		22
24	Roc Oliva		18

=== Netherlands ===
Head coach: Roelant Oltmans

No.	Player	Pos.	Age
1	Geert-Jan Derikx		26
2	Wouter Jolie		22
3	Guus Vogels	GK	32
4	Erik Bouwens		19
5	Rob Derikx		24
6	Thomas Boerma		26
8	Ronald Brouwer		28
9	Roderick Weusthof		25
10	Taeke Taekema		27
11	Laurence Docherty		27
12	Jeroen Delmee (C)		34

No.	Player	Pos.	Age
13	Marcel Koeton	GK	27
14	Teun de Nooijer		31
15	Eby Kessing		23
16	Floris Evers		24
18	Rob Reckers		25
19	Matthijs Brouwer		27
23	Timme Hoyng		31
24	Robert van der Horst		22
26	Jaap Stockmann	GK	23
27	Rogier Hofman		20

=== France ===
Head coach: Bertrand Reynaud

No.	Player	Pos.	Age
1	Matthieu Durchon		26
3	Arnaud Becuwe		26
4	Charles Verrier		27
6	Nicolas Musgens		27
7	Christoph Musgens		28
9	Martin Genestet		21
10	Frédéric Soyez (C)		29
11	Bastien Dierckens		19
12	Thomas Gourdin		23

No.	Player	Pos.	Age
13	François Scheefer		20
14	Sébastien Jean-Jean		28
15	Joost Jansen		18
16	Arnoud Jansen		23
17	Gérôme Branquart		23
18	Frédéric Verrier		25
22	Antoine Gouedard Comte		25
30	Julien Thamin	GK	26
31	Maxime Wilson	GK	23

=== Ireland ===
Head coach: David Passmore

No.	Player	Pos.	Age
2	Mark Ruddle	GK	26
3	Patrick Brown (C)		31
5	Karl Burns		26
6	Ronan Gormley		24
8	Stephen Butler		27
9	Mark Gleghorne		22
10	Mark Irwin		30
11	John Jermyn		25
12	Eugene Magee		21

No.	Player	Pos.	Age
15	Graham Shaw		28
16	David Hobbs		25
17	Andy Barbour		30
18	Mark Black		27
21	Timothy Cockram		23
22	Phelie Maguire		23
23	Iain Lewers		23
24	Geoff McCabe		21
30	David Harte	GK	19
