= 2003 Men's Hockey Champions Challenge =

Field hockey tournament

Tournament details
- Host country: South Africa
- City: Johannesburg
- Dates: 19 – 27 July
- Teams: 6
- Venue: Randburg Hockey Stadium

Final positions
- Champions: Spain (1st title)
- Runner-up: South Korea
- Third place: South Africa

Tournament statistics
- Matches played: 18
- Goals scored: 78 (4.33 per match)
- Top scorer: (South Korea) Lee Jung-Seon (10 goals)

The 2003 Men's Hockey Champions Challenge took place in Johannesburg, South Africa from 19–27 July 2003. This was the second edition of the tournament introduced in 2001 by the International Hockey Federation (FIH) to broaden hockey's competitive base globally.

Spain qualified for a spot at the 2004 Champions Trophy in Lahore, Pakistan after defeating Korea 7–3 in the final.

== Squads ==
England

Head Coach: Mike Hamilton

1. Jimi Lewis (GK)
2. Simon Mason (GK)
3. Robert Todd
4. Jason Collins
5. Jon Peckett
6. Craig Parnham (c)
7. Guy Fordham
8. Andy West
9. Mark Pearn
10. Jimmy Wallis
11. Brett Garrard
12. David Mathews
13. Danny Hall
14. Ben Hawes
15. Barry Middleton
16. Martin Jones
17. Michael Johnson
18. Jerome Goudie
Malaysia

Head Coach: Paul Lissek

1. Roslan Jamaluddin (GK)
2. Muhamad Amin Rahim
3. Chua Boon Huat
4. Gobinathan Krishnamurthy
5. Kuhan Shanmuganathan (c)
6. Nor Azlan Bakar
7. Azlan Misron
8. Jiwa Mohan
9. Mohammed Madzli Ikmar
10. Tajol Rosli Mohamed
11. Mohamed Rodhanizam Radzi
12. Keevan Raj Kalikavandan
13. Ismail Abu
14. Prabahkaran Periyathamby
15. Shaiful Azli Abdul Rahman
16. Kumar Subramamiam (GK)
17. Fairuz Ramli Mohamed
New Zealand

Head Coach: Charlie Oscroft

1. Simon Towns (c)
2. Mitesh Patel
3. David Kosoof
4. Darren Smith
5. Wayne McIndoe
6. Dion Gosling
7. Blair Hopping
8. Dean Couzins
9. Casey Henwood
10. Ryan Archibald
11. Umesh Parag
14. Bevan Hari
16. Paul Woolford (GK)
17. Kyle Pontifex (GK)
18. Phil Burrows
19. Hayden Shaw
21. Bryce Collins
24. Gareth Brooks
South Africa

Head Coach: Paul Revington

1. David Staniforth (GK)
3. Ken Forbes
4. Craig Jackson (c)
5. Craig Fulton
6. Bruce Jacobs
7. Gregg Clark
8. Iain Evans
9. Emile Smith
10. Mike Cullen
12. Justin King
13. Steve Evans
14. Eric Rose-Innes
15. Kevin Chree
16. Marvin Bam
17. Reece Basson
18. Wayne Denne
19. Chris Hibbert (GK)
20. Charl van der Merwe
South Korea

Head Coach: Kim Young-Kyu

1. Koo Dong-Shik (GK)
2. Cha Jong-Bok
3. Hong Eun-Seong
5. Lim Jung-Woo
6. Lee Sung-Min
7. Kim Chul
8. Kim Jung-Chul (c)
9. Seo Jong-Ho
10. Yoon Young-Sik
11. Lee Jung-Seon
13. Lee Nam-Yong
15. Hwang Seung-Sun
17. Yoo Min-Ho
19. You Hyo-Sik
20. Park Wan-Tae
21. Jang Jong-Hyun
22. Kim Sam-Seok
23. Hong Sung-Kweon
Spain

Head Coach: Maurits Hendriks

1. Bernardino Herrera (GK)
2. Santi Freixa
3. Pau Quemada
4. Marc Garcia-Cascon
5. Francisco "Kiko" Fábregas
6. Miquel Codina
7. Juan Escarré (c)
8. Alex Fàbregas
9. Pol Amat
10. Eduard Tubau
11. Eduardo Aguilar
12. Alberto Esteban
13. Ramón Alegre
14. Josep Sánchez
16. Xavier Ribas
17. Albert Sala
18. Rodrigo Garza
22. Francisco Cortés (GK)

== Umpires ==
Below are the 9 umpires appointed by the International Hockey Federation:

- Murray Grime (AUS)
- Han Jin-Soo (KOR)
- David Leiper (SCO)
- Nick Lockhart (ENG)
- Markus Meyer (GER)
- Deon Nel (RSA)
- Juan Manuel Requena (ESP)
- Ravinderpal Singh (MAS)
- John Wright (RSA)

== Results ==
All times are South African Standard Time (UTC+02:00)

=== Pool ===
| Pos | Team | Pld | W | D | L | GF | GA | GD | Pts | Qualification |
|---|---|---|---|---|---|---|---|---|---|---|
| 1 | Spain | 5 | 4 | 0 | 1 | 15 | 9 | +6 | 12 | Final |
| 2 | South Korea | 5 | 3 | 1 | 1 | 12 | 8 | +4 | 10 | Final |
| 3 | New Zealand | 5 | 2 | 2 | 1 | 9 | 5 | +4 | 8 | Third Place Match |
| 4 | South Africa (H) | 5 | 2 | 0 | 3 | 7 | 8 | −1 | 6 | Third Place Match |
| 5 | Malaysia | 5 | 1 | 1 | 3 | 10 | 13 | −3 | 4 | Fifth Place Match |
| 6 | England | 5 | 1 | 0 | 4 | 6 | 16 | −10 | 3 | Fifth Place Match |

Source: FIH
Rules for classification: 1) points; 2) goal difference; 3) goals scored; 4) head-to-head result.
(H) Hosts

19 July 2003
13:00

| South Korea | 0–0 | New Zealand |
|---|---|---|
| | Report |

Umpires:
John Wright (RSA)
Ravinderpal Singh (MAS)

19 July 2003
15:00

| England | 2–6 | Spain |
|---|---|---|
| Middleton 12'; Goudie 70' | Report | Ribas 4', 34'; Amat 35', 45'; Tubau 41', 68' |

Umpires:
David Leiper (SCO)
Deon Nel (RSA)

19 July 2003
17:00

| Malaysia | 1–3 | South Africa |
|---|---|---|
| Kuhan 3' | Report | King 9', 48'; Smith 50' |

Umpires:
Murray Grime (AUS)
Markus Meyer (GER)

20 July 2003
13:00

| Spain | 2–3 | South Korea |
|---|---|---|
| Tubau 4'; Ribas 55' | Report | Lee J. 48', 52', 64' |

Umpires:
Nick Lockhart (ENG)
Markus Meyer (GER)

20 July 2003
15:00

| South Africa | 0–2 | England |
|---|---|---|
| | Report | Hall 8'; Pearn 55' |

Umpires:
Han Jin-Soo (KOR)
Murray Grime (AUS)

20 July 2003
17:00

| New Zealand | 1–1 | Malaysia |
|---|---|---|
| Brooks 32' | Report | Ismail 58' |

Umpires:
John Wright (RSA)
Juan Manuel Requena (ESP)

22 July 2003
14:30

| Malaysia | 4–1 | England |
|---|---|---|
| Mohan 15'; Keevan 50'; Azlan 59'; Tajol 68' | Report | Garrard 6' |

Umpires:
Juam Manuel Requena (ESP)
Deon Nel (RSA)

22 July 2003
16:30

| New Zealand | 2–3 | Spain |
|---|---|---|
| Parag 7'; Hari 38' | Report | Ribas 23'; Tubau 40'; Garza 70' |

Umpires:
Han Jin-Soo (KOR)
Nick Lockhart (ENG)

22 July 2003
18:30

| South Korea | 2–3 | South Africa |
|---|---|---|
| Lee J. 12', 65' | Report | King 11'; Basson 55'; Evans 68' |

Umpires:
Ravinderpal Singh (MAS)
David Leiper (SCO)

23 July 2003
14:30

| Spain | 3–2 | Malaysia |
|---|---|---|
| Freixa 9'; Esteban 23'; Amat 35' | Report | Kuhan 17', 57' |

Umpires:
John Wright (RSA)
Deon Nel (RSA)

23 July 2003
16:30

| South Korea | 2–1 | England |
|---|---|---|
| Lee J. 3'; You 29' | Report | Mathews 52' |

Umpires:
Markus Meyer (GER)
Juan Manuel Requena (ESP)

23 July 2003
18:30

| South Africa | 1–2 | New Zealand |
|---|---|---|
| King 3' | Report | Hari 34'; Shaw 44' |

Umpires:
David Leiper (SCO)
Murray Grime (AUS)

25 July 2003
14:30

| England | 0–4 | New Zealand |
|---|---|---|
| | Report | Burrows 9', 40'; Shaw 11'; Hari 59' |

Umpires:
Ravinderpal Singh (MAS)
Deon Nel (RSA)

25 July 2003
16:30

| Malaysia | 2–5 | South Korea |
|---|---|---|
| Kuhan 25'; Tajol 41' | Report | Lee J. 12', 30', 39'; Seo 45'; Hwang 70' |

Umpires:
Nick Lockhart (ENG)
John Wright (RSA)

25 July 2003
18:30

| South Africa | 0–1 | Spain |
|---|---|---|
| | Report | Ribas 63' |

Umpires:
Han Jin-Soo (KOR)
David Leiper (SCO)

=== Classification ===
==== Fifth and sixth place ====
27 July 2003
10:00

| Malaysia | 2–3 | England |
|---|---|---|
| Kuhan 19', 22' | Report | Hawes 14'; Wallis 64'; Hall 68' |

Umpires:
Deon Nel (RSA)
Juan Manuel Requena (ESP)

==== Third and fourth place ====
27 July 2003
12:30

| New Zealand | 2–2 (a.e.t.) | South Africa |
|---|---|---|
| Shaw 26', 48' | Report | Cullen 44'; King 46' |
Penalties
| Shaw (penalty shoot-out scored); Archibald (penalty shoot-out scored); Couzins (penalty shoot-out scored); Hopping (penalty shoot-out missed); Brooks (penalty shoot-out scored) ——— Shaw (penalty shoot-out missed) | 4–5 | (penalty shoot-out scored) Cullen; (penalty shoot-out missed) Denne; (penalty shoot-out scored) King; (penalty shoot-out scored) Fulton; (penalty shoot-out scored) Evans ——— (penalty shoot-out scored) Cullen |

Umpires:
Han Jin-Soo (KOR)
Nick Lockhart (ENG)

==== Final ====
27 July 2003
15:00

| Spain | 7–3 | South Korea |
|---|---|---|
| Escarré 3'; Tubau 8', 36', 41'; Esteban 14', 63'; Ribas 61' | Report | Lee J. 20'; Seo 62'; You 64' |

Umpires:
Murray Grime (AUS)
David Leiper (SCO)

== Awards ==
| Top Scorer | Best Goalkeeper |
|---|---|
| (South Korea) Lee Jung-Seon | (South Africa) David Staniforth |

== Final rankings ==
As per statistical convention in field hockey, matches decided in extra time are counted as wins and losses, while matches decided by penalty shoot-outs are counted as draws.

| Pos | Team | Pld | W | D | L | GF | GA | GD | Pts | Qualification |
|---|---|---|---|---|---|---|---|---|---|---|
| 1st place, gold medalist(s) | Spain | 6 | 5 | 0 | 1 | 22 | 12 | +10 | 15 | Qualified for 2004 Champions Trophy |
| 2nd place, silver medalist(s) | South Korea | 6 | 3 | 1 | 2 | 15 | 15 | 0 | 10 | |
| 3rd place, bronze medalist(s) | South Africa (H) | 6 | 2 | 1 | 3 | 9 | 10 | −1 | 7 | |
| 4 | New Zealand | 6 | 2 | 3 | 1 | 11 | 7 | +4 | 9 | |
| 5 | England | 6 | 2 | 0 | 4 | 9 | 18 | −9 | 6 | |
| 6 | Malaysia | 6 | 1 | 1 | 4 | 12 | 16 | −4 | 4 | |

Source: FIH
(H) Hosts

== Goalscorers ==
There were 78 goals scored in 18 matches, for an average of 4.33 goals per match.

10 goals

- (South Korea) Lee Jung-seon

7 goals

- (Spain) Eduardo Tubau

6 goals

- (Malaysia) Kuhan Shanmuganathan
- (Spain) Xavier Ribas

5 goals

- (South Africa) Justin King

4 goals

- (New Zealand) Hayden Shaw

3 goals

- (New Zealand) Bevan Hari
- (Spain) Pol Amat
- (Spain) Alberto Esteban

2 goals

- (England) Daniel Hall
- (Malaysia) Tajol Rosli Mohamad
- (New Zealand) Philip Burrows
- (South Korea) Seo Jong-ho
- (South Korea) You Hyo-sik

1 goal

- (England) Brett Garrard
- (England) Jerome Goudie
- (England) Benjamin Hawes
- (England) Davis Mathews
- (England) Barry Middleton
- (England) Mark Pearn
- (England) James Wallis
- (Malaysia) Ismail Abu
- (Malaysia) Mohan Jiwa
- (Malaysia) Azlan Misron
- (Malaysia) Keevan Raj
- (New Zealand) Gareth Brooks
- (New Zealand) Umesh Parag
- (South Africa) Reece Basson
- (South Africa) Michael Cullen
- (South Africa) Steven Evans
- (South Africa) Emile Smith
- (South Korea) Hwang Seung-sun
- (Spain) Juan Escarré
- (Spain) Santiago Freixa
- (Spain) Rodrigo Garza
