= 2005 Men's Hockey Champions Trophy =

Field hockey tournament

Tournament details
- Host country: India
- City: Chennai
- Dates: 10–18 December
- Teams: 6
- Venue: Mayor Radhakrishnan Stadium

Final positions
- Champions: Australia (8th title)
- Runner-up: Netherlands
- Third place: Spain

Tournament statistics
- Matches played: 18
- Goals scored: 90 (5 per match)
- Top scorer: (Spain) Santi Freixa (7 goals)
- Best player: (Australia) Bevan George

The 2005 Men's Hockey Champions Trophy was the 27th edition of the Hockey Champions Trophy men's field hockey tournament. It was held in Chennai, India from 10–18 December 2005.

== Squads ==
Australia

Head Coach: Barry Dancer

1. Jamie Dwyer
2. Liam de Young
4. Michael McCann
7. Nathan Eglington
9. Mark Knowles
12. David Guest
13. Luke Doerner
14. Grant Schubert
15. Bevan George (C)
17. Andrew Smith
18. Stephen Lambert (GK)
20. Matt Naylor
21. Aaron Hopkins
23. Matthew Wells
24. Travis Brooks
25. Brent Livermore
26. Dean Butler
30. Stephen Mowlam (GK)
Germany

Head Coach: Bernhard Peters

1. Christian Schulte (GK)
2. Ulrich Bubolz (GK)
3. Philip Witte
7. Carlos Nevado
8. Christoph Menke
9. Moritz Fürste
10. Jan-Marco Montag
12. Sebastian Biederlack
13. Justus Scharowsky
14. Tibor Weißenborn
16. Niklas Meinert
17. Timo Weß (C)
19. Christopher Zeller
21. Michael Purps
22. Matthias Witthaus
25. Philipp Zeller
28. Nico Sonnenschein
29. Sebastian Draguhn
India

Head Coach: Rajinder Singh

1. Bharat Chettri (GK)
2. William Xalxo
3. Kanwalpreet Singh
4. Sandeep Singh
6. Ignace Tirkey
7. Prabhjot Singh
10. Ravipal Singh
11. Gagan Ajit Singh (C)
12. Adrian D'Souza (GK)
15. Rajpal Singh
18. Viren Rasquinha
19. V Raja
21. Vinaya Vakkaliga Swamy
23. Arjun Halappa
24. Adam Sinclair
25. Harpal Singh
27. Vikram Pillay
28. Tushar Khandker
Netherlands

Head Coach: Roelant Oltmans

1. Guus Vogels (GK)
3. Geert-Jan Derikx
4. Karel Klaver
7. Sander van der Weide
8. Ronald Brouwer
10. Taeke Taekema
12. Jeroen Delmee (C)
13. Klaas Veering (GK)
14. Teun de Nooijer
16. Floris Evers
17. Teun Rohof
18. Rob Reckers
19. Matthijs Brouwer
21. Maikel Brekelmans
22. Roderick Weusthof
23. Timme Hoyng
24. Robert van der Horst
25. Marcel Balkestein
Pakistan

Head Coach: Asif Bajwa

1. Salman Akbar (GK)
2. Imran Warsi
4. Sajjid Anwar
5. Muhammad Saqlain (C)
7. Dilawar Hussain
8. Adnan Maqsood
9. Tariq Aziz
10. Rehan Butt
11. Muhammad Shabbir
12. Nasir Ahmed (GK)
14. Mudassar Ali Khan
15. Shakeel Abbasi
16. Imran Khan
17. Adnan Zakir
19. Muhammad Imran
22. Zeeshan Ashraf
23. Waqas Sharif
29. Akhtar Ali
Spain

Head Coach: Maurits Hendriks

1. Bernardino Herrera (GK)
2. Santi Freixa
3. Miquel Delas
5. Francisco "Kiko" Fábregas (C)
6. Andreu Enrich
8. Alex Fàbregas
9. Pol Amat
10. Eduard Tubau
11. Jorge Rodriquez
13. Ramón Alegre
14. Héctor González
15. Víctor Sojo
16. Xavier Ribas
17. Albert Sala
18. Rodrigo Garza
21. Eduard Arbós
22. Francisco Cortés (GK)
23. David Alegre

== Umpires ==
The following umpires were nominated by International Hockey Federation (FIH) for this tournament:

- Xavier Adell (ESP)
- David Gentles (AUS)
- Satinder Kumar (IND)
- David Leiper (SCO)
- Jason McCracken (NZL)
- Philip Schellekens (NED)
- John Wright (RSA)
- Raghu Prasad (IND)

== Results ==
All times are Indian Standard Time (UTC+05:30)

=== Pool ===
Team	Pld	W	D	L	GF	GA	GD	Pts
Australia	5	4	1	0	18	9	+9	13
Netherlands	5	3	1	1	13	9	+4	10
Spain	5	3	0	2	13	12	+1	9
Germany	5	1	2	2	10	13	−3	5
India	5	1	0	4	6	11	−5	3
Pakistan	5	0	2	3	12	18	−6	2

Source: FIH

10 December 2005
16:30

Germany	1–4	Australia
C. Zeller 61'	Report	Dwyer 14', 36'; Eglington 30'; Livermore 39'

Umpires:
John Wright (RSA)
Raghu Prasad (IND)

10 December 2005
18:30

Spain	2–1	India
Tubau 20'; Amat 48'	Report	Kanwalpreet 31'

Umpires:
Philip Schellekens (NED)
David Gentles (AUS)

10 December 2005
20:30

Netherlands	4–1	Pakistan
M. Brouwer 5'; De Nooijer 13'; R. Brouwer 44'; Reckers 61'	Report	Ali Khan 54'

Umpires:
David Leiper (SCO)
Satinder Kumar (IND)

11 December 2005
16:30

Australia	4–2	Spain
Brooks 5'; Livermore 45'; Doerner 50'; McCann 66'	Report	Freixa 12', 26'

Umpires:
David Leiper (SCO)
Satinder Kumar (IND)

11 December 2005
18:30

Pakistan	2–3	India
Imran 54'; Aziz 57'	Report	Khandker 60'; Sandeep 61', 68'

Umpires:
John Wright (RSA)
Xavier Adell (ESP)

11 December 2005
20:30

Netherlands	2–2	Germany
Weusthof 15', 46'	Report	C. Zeller 63'; Witthaus 66'

Umpires:
David Gentles (AUS)
Jason McCracken (NZL)

13 December 2005
16:30

Netherlands	3–2	Spain
M. Brouwer 10', 54'; Klaver 56'	Report	Freixa 60'; Tubau 64'

Umpires:
John Wright (RSA)
David Gentles (AUS)

13 December 2005
18:30

India	1–4	Australia
Khandker 31'	Report	Eglington 1', 14'; Butler 12'; Brooks 20'

Umpires:
Xavier Adell (ESP)
Jason McCracken (NZL)

13 December 2005
20:30

Pakistan	4–4	Germany
Imran 7'; Abbasi 28'; Butt 34'; Saqlain 67'	Report	C. Zeller 30', 60'; Nevado 30'; Montag 46'

Umpires:
Philip Schellekens (NED)
David Leiper (SCO)

14 December 2005
16:30

Australia	3–2	Netherlands
Naylor 12'; Smith 27'; McCann 68'	Report	Taekema 21', 42'

Umpires:
John Wright (RSA)
David Leiper (SCO)

14 December 2005
18:30

India	0–1	Germany
	Report	Montag 17'

Umpires:
Xavier Adell (ESP)
David Gentles (AUS)

14 December 2005
20:30

Pakistan	2–4	Spain
Ali Khan 54'; Saqlain 68'	Report	Amat 5', 42'; D. Alegre 23'; Ribas 45'

Umpires:
Jason McCracken (NZL)
John Wright (RSA)

16 December 2005
16:30

Spain	3–2	Germany
Freixa 4', 47'; R. Alegre 57'	Report	Meinert 51'; Witthaus 59'

Umpires:
David Leiper (SCO)
John Wright (RSA)

16 December 2005
18:30

India	1–2	Netherlands
Sandeep 66'	Report	Weusthof 51'; Taekema 70'

Umpires:
Jason McCracken (NZL)
David Gentles (AUS)

16 December 2005
20:30

Pakistan	3–3	Australia
Imran 34'; Butt 39'; Ali Khan 60'	Report	Doerner 31'; Naylor 55'; Wells 57'

Umpires:
Raghu Prasad (IND)
Philip Schellekens (NED)

=== Classification ===
==== Fifth and sixth place ====
18 December 2005
15:00

India	3–4	Pakistan
Kanwalpreet 2'; Prabhjot 14'; Gagan Ajit 64'	Report	Imran 33'; Ali 38'; Saqlain 48'; Butt 62'

Umpires:
Xavier Adell (ESP)
David Gentles (AUS)

==== Third and fourth place ====
18 December 2005
17:30

Spain	5–2	Germany
Freixa 13', 69'; Fàbregas 22'; Amat 41', 57'	Report	Fürste 28'; Witthaus 59'

Umpires:
Satinder Kumar (IND)
Jason McCracken (NZL)

==== Final ====
18 December 2005
20:00

Australia	3–1	Netherlands
Wells 21'; De Young 36'; Dwyer 62'	Report	Taekema 66'

Umpires:
John Wright (RSA)
David Leiper (SCO)

== Awards ==
- Topscorer
  - (Spain) Santi Freixa
- Best Player
  - (Australia) Bevan George
- Fair Play Trophy
  - Spain

== Final standings ==
1. Australia
2. Netherlands
3. Spain
4. Germany
5. Pakistan
6. India
