= 2003 Men's Hockey Champions Trophy =

International hockey tournament

Tournament details
- Host country: Netherlands
- City: Amstelveen
- Dates: 16–24 August
- Teams: 6
- Venue: Wagener Stadium

Final positions
- Champions: Netherlands (7th title)
- Runner-up: Australia
- Third place: Pakistan

Tournament statistics
- Matches played: 18
- Goals scored: 125 (6.94 per match)
- Top scorer: (Argentina) Jorge Lombi (10 goals)

The 2003 Men's Hockey Champions Trophy was the 25th edition of the Hockey Champions Trophy men's field hockey tournament. It was held in Amstelveen, Netherlands from August 16–24, 2003.

Netherlands won their fifth title after defeated Australia 4–2 in the final.

== Squads ==
Argentina

Head Coach: Jorge Ruiz

1. Pablo Moreira (GK / C)
2. Juan Pablo Hourquebie
3. Lucas Cammareri
4. Matías Vila
5. Ezequiel Paulón
7. Mario Almada
8. Carlos Retegui
10. Tomás MacCormik
11. Diego Avila
12. Marcos Riccardi
13. Jorge Lombi
14. Fernando Zylberberg
15. Germán Orozco
16. Juan Manuel Esparis
17. Matías Paredes
18. Lucas Rey
19. Juan Manuel Vivaldi (GK)
20. Juan Garreta
Australia

Head Coach: Barry Dancer

1. Jamie Dwyer
3. Adam Commens
4. Michael McCann
5. Troy Elder
6. Robert Hammond
7. Nathan Eglington
8. Craig Victory
10. Paul Gaudoin (C)
12. Tristram Woodhouse
14. Grant Schubert
15. Bevan George
18. Stephen Lambert (GK)
19. Mark Hickman (GK)
21. Aaron Hopkins
23. Matthew Wells
25. Brent Livermore
26. Dean Butler
27. Zain Wright
Germany

Head Coach: Uli Forstner

2. Christian Schulte (GK)
3. Alexander Sahmel
4. Jan-Marco Montag
5. Till Kriwet
6. Maik Günther
7. Christoph Menke
8. Ulrich Klaus
9. Benedikt Sperling
10. Max Jesse
11. Sebastian Draguhn
12. Niklas Meinert
14. Bastian Timm
15. Nicolas Emmerling
16. Eike Duckwitz
17. Oliver Markowsky
20. Benjamin Köpp
21. Ulrich Bubolz (GK)
26. Justus Scharowsky
India

Head Coach: Rajinder Singh

1. Devesh Chauhan (GK)
2. Kanwalpreet Singh
3. Dilip Tirkey
4. Baljit Singh Saini
5. Bimal Lakra
6. Ignace Tirkey
7. Vikram Pillay
8. Deepak Thakur
9. Dhanraj Pillay (C)
10. Baljit Singh Dhillon
11. Gagan Ajit Singh
12. VS Vinay
14. Prabhjot Singh
15. Tejbir Singh
16. Kamaldeep Singh (GK)
18. Viren Rasquinha
21. Didar Singh
22. Jugraj Singh
Netherlands

Head Coach: Joost Bellaart

1. Guus Vogels (GK)
2. Bram Lomans
3. Geert-Jan Derikx
4. Erik Jazet
5. Rob Derikx
6. Floris Evers
7. Sander van der Weide
8. Ronald Brouwer
9. Piet-Hein Geeris
10. Taeke Taekema
12. Jeroen Delmee (C)
14. Teun de Nooijer
15. Karel Klaver
16. Jan Jörn van 't Land
17. Klaas Veering (GK)
18. Rob Reckers
19. Matthijs Brouwer
21. Nick Meijer
Pakistan

Head Coach: Tahir Zaman

1. Ahmed Alam (GK)
2. Kashif Jawad
3. Mohammad Asim
4. Adnan Maqsood
5. Waseem Ahmed
6. Sameer Hussain
7. Ghazanar Ali
8. Mudassar Ali Khan
9. Sohail Abbas
10. Ali Raza
11. Muhammad Saqlain
12. Salman Akbar (GK)
13. Rehan Butt
14. Dilawar Hussain
15. Salim Khalid
16. Zeeshan Ashraf
17. Muhammad Shabbir
18. Muhammad Nadeem

== Umpires ==
Below is the list of umpires appointed by International Hockey Federation (FIH) for this tournament:

- Amarjit Singh (MAS)
- Stephen Brooks (ENG)
- Mohammad Faiz (PAK)
- Jason McCracken (NZL)
- Ray O'Connor (IRL)
- Tim Pullman (AUS)
- Edmundo Saladino (ARG)
- Rob ten Cate (NED)
- Virendra Singh (IND)

== Results ==
All times are Central European Summer Time (UTC+02:00)

=== Pool ===
Pos	Team	Pld	W	D	L	GF	GA	GD	Pts
1	Netherlands	5	4	1	0	23	11	+12	13
2	Australia	5	3	1	1	25	14	+11	10
3	Pakistan	5	2	2	1	21	20	+1	8
4	India	5	2	0	3	16	18	−2	6
5	Argentina	5	2	0	3	18	23	−5	6
6	Germany	5	0	0	5	6	23	−17	0

Source: FIH

16 August 2003
12:30

Pakistan	4–4	Australia
M. Ali 6'; Abbas 11', 31'; Khalid 63'	Report	Schubert 14', 70'; Elder 32'; Butler 64'

Umpires:
Rob ten Cate (NED)
Amarjit Singh (MAS)

16 August 2003
15:00

Netherlands	4–3	India
Reckers 63'; Taekema 64'; Evers 68'; R. Brouwer 70'	Report	J. Singh 44'; Thakur 51'; GS Singh 62'

Umpires:
Stephen Brooks (ENG)
Edmundo Saladino (ARG)

17 August 2003
12:30

Argentina	5–6	Pakistan
Vila 33'; Almada 36'; Cammareri 45'; Lombi 56', 61'	Report	Abbas 7', 11'; Shabbir 14', 25'; Jawad 39'; Butt 69'

Umpires:
Jason McCracken (NZL)
Virendra Singh (IND)

17 August 2003
15:00

Australia	3–5	Netherlands
Eglington 30'; Wells 53'; Butler 65'	Report	M. Brouwer 10'; Klaver 22'; Reckers 40'; Taekema 47'; Lomans 51'

Umpires:
Muhammad Faiz (PAK)
Ray O'Connor (IRL)

17 August 2003
17:00

India	3–2	Germany
GS Singh 42', 68'; P. Singh 61'	Report	Sperling 15'; Sahmel 46'

Umpires:
Tim Pullman (AUS)
Amarjit Singh (MAS)

18 August 2003
16:30

Germany	1–3	Argentina
Meinert 65'	Report	Lombi 5', 58'; Almada 40'

Umpires:
Rob ten Cate (NED)
Mohammad Faiz (PAK)

19 August 2003
17:00

India	1–4	Australia
D. Tirkey 49'	Report	Schubert 33', 44', 60'; Elder 46'

Umpires:
Amarjit Singh (MAS)
Ray O'Connor (IRL)

19 August 2003
19:30

Netherlands	2–2	Pakistan
de Nooijer 5'; Taekema 59'	Report	Abbas 27'; Jawad 64'

Umpires:
Edmundo Saladino (ARG)
Jason McCracken (NZL)

20 August 2003
15:00

Australia	6–1	Germany
McCann 9', 20'; Commens 15'; Schubert 16', 56'; Hopkins 54'	Report	Sahmel 66'

Umpires:
Virendra Singh (IND)
Edmundo Saladino (ARG)

20 August 2003
17:00

Argentina	4–2	India
Lombi 18', 44'; Vila 24'; Almada 37'	Report	Thakur 30'; Dhillon 48'

Umpires:
Jason McCracken (NZL)
Tim Pullman (AUS)

21 August 2003
17:00

Pakistan	5–2	Germany
Jawad 5', 25'; Butt 15'; Abbas 65'; Khalid 68'	Report	Sperling 42'; Köpp 46'

Umpires:
Stephen Brooks (ENG)
Ray O'Connor (IRL)

21 August 2003
19:30

Netherlands	6–3	Argentina
R. Brouwer 15', 47'; Taekema 19'; M. Brouwer 30'; Klaver 44'; Reckers 59'	Report	Paredes 7'; Lombi 28', 33'

Umpires:
Tim Pullman (AUS)
Amarjit Singh (MAS)

22 August 2003
17:00

India	7–4	Pakistan
J. Singh 24', 35'; Thakur 50', 65'; P. Singh 54'; GS Singh 60', 62'	Report	Butt 18'; Nadeem 20'; M. Ali 28'; Abbas 42'

Umpires:
Jason McCracken (NZL)
Rob ten Cate (NED)

23 August 2003
12:30

Argentina	3–8	Australia
Lombi 45', 69'; Retegui 57'	Report	McCann 12', 53'; Victory 28'; Schubert 38', 58'; Elder 55'; Hammond 60'; Woodhouse 63'

Umpires:
Ray O'Connor (IRL)
Amarjit Singh (MAS)

23 August 2003
15:00

Germany	0–6	Netherlands
	Report	Lomans 21', 29'; Klaver 24' de Nooijer 44', 56'; Evers 70'

Umpires:
Edmundo Saladino (ARG)
Muhammad Faiz (PAK)

=== Classification ===
==== Fifth and sixth place ====
24 August 2003
10:00

Argentina	2–1	Germany
Almada 37'; Vila 61'	Report	Köpp 64'

Umpires:
Virendra Singh (IND)
Tim Pullman (AUS)

==== Third and fourth place ====
24 August 2003
12:30

Pakistan	4–3	India
Abbas 31', 61'; Jawad 42'; Butt 68'	Report	J. Singh 26'; P. Singh 35'; Thakur 48'

Umpires:
Edmundo Saladino (ARG)
Rob ten Cate (NED)

==== Final ====
24 August 2003
15:00

Netherlands	4–2	Australia
M. Brouwer 24'; Geeris 30' de Nooijer 60'; Klaver 67'	Report	Victory 28'; Elder 59'

Umpires:
Jason McCracken (NZL)
Ray O'Connor (IRL)

== Final standings ==
1. Netherlands
2. Australia
3. Pakistan
4. India
5. Argentina
6. Germany
