= 2004 Men's Hockey Champions Trophy =

Field hockey tournament

Tournament details
- Host country: Pakistan
- City: Lahore
- Dates: 4–12 December
- Teams: 6
- Venue: National Hockey Stadium

Final positions
- Champions: Spain (1st title)
- Runner-up: Netherlands
- Third place: Pakistan

Tournament statistics
- Matches played: 18
- Goals scored: 85 (4.72 per match)
- Top scorer: (Netherlands) Karel Klaver (7 goals)
- Best player: (Netherlands) Karel Klaver
- Best young player: (Pakistan) Shakeel Abbasi

The 2004 Men's Hockey Champions Trophy was the 26th edition of the Hockey Champions Trophy men's field hockey tournament. It was held in Lahore, Pakistan from December 4–12, 2004.

== Squads ==
Germany

Head Coach: Bernhard Peters

1. Ulrich Bubolz (GK)
2. Adrian Kühn (GK)
3. Ulrich Klaus
4. Philipp Crone (C)
6. Eike Duckwitz
7. Carlos Nevado
9. Christian Wein
10. Christoph Menke
15. Maik Günther
16. Niklas Meinert
18. Till Kriwet
20. Benedikt Sperling
21. Michael Purps
23. Florian Keller
26. Oliver Hentschel
27. Jan-Marco Montag
30. Nicolas Emmerling
31. Moritz Falcke
India

Head Coach: Gerhard Rach

1. Devesh Chauhan (GK)
3. Dilip Tirkey (C)
4. Sandeep Singh
5. Vivek Gupta
11. Girish Pimpale
12. Adrian D'Souza (GK)
14. William Xalxo
18. Viren Rasquinha
19. Ignace Tirkey
20. Prabodh Tirkey
21. VS Vinaya
22. Hari Prasad
23. Arjun Halappa
24. Adam Sinclair
25. Harpal Singh
27. Vikram Pillay
28. Tushar Khandekar
30. Sundeep Michael
Netherlands

Head Coach: Terry Walsh

1. Guus Vogels (GK)
3. Geert-Jan Derikx
5. Rob Derikx
6. Floris Evers
7. Sander van der Weide
8. Ronald Brouwer
10. Taeke Taekema
12. Jeroen Delmee (captain)
13. Klaas Veering (GK)
14. Teun de Nooijer
15. Karel Klaver
18. Rob Reckers
19. Matthijs Brouwer
20. Jesse Mahieu
21. Nick Meijer
22. Roderick Weusthof
23. Timme Hoyng
24. Robert van der Horst
New Zealand

Head Coach: Kevin Towns

1. Simon Towns (C)
2. Mitesh Patel
3. David Kosoof
4. Darren Smith
5. Wayne McIndoe
6. Dion Gosling
7. Blair Hopping
8. Dean Couzins
10. Ryan Archibald
12. Bradley Shaw
13. Dharmesh Puna
14. Bevan Hari
16. Paul Woolford (GK)
17. Kyle Pontifex (GK)
18. Phil Burrows
20. James Nation
22. Lloyd Stephenson
24. Gareth Brooks
Pakistan

Head Coach: Roelant Oltmans

1. Salman Akbar (GK)
2. Kashif Jawad
3. Mudassar Ali Khan
4. Ghazanfar Ali
5. Muhammad Saqlain
6. Waseem Ahmed (C)
7. Dilawar Hussain
8. Rehan Butt
9. Sohail Abbas
10. Zeeshan Ashraf
11. Shabbir Hussain
12. Nasir Ahmed (GK)
13. Adnan Maqsood
14. Shakeel Abbasi
15. Tariq Aziz
16. Muhammad Imran
17. Akhtar Ali
18. Adnan Zakir
Spain

Head Coach: Maurits Hendriks

1. Bernardino Herrera (GK)
2. Santi Freixa
3. Pau Quemada
5. Francisco "Kiko" Fábregas
6. Andreu Enrich
7. Juan Escarré (C)
8. Alex Fàbregas
12. Alberto Esteban
13. Ramón Alegre
15. Víctor Sojo
17. Albert Sala
18. Rodrigo Garza
20. Sergi Enrique
21. Eduard Arbós
22. Francisco Cortés (GK)
23. David Alegre
24. Ignacio Arbos
26. Juan Fernández

== Umpires ==
Below is the eight umpires appointed by International Hockey Federation (FIH):

- Rashad Butt (PAK)
- Ged Curran (SCO)
- Muhammad Faiz (PAK)
- Hamish Jamson (ENG)
- Tim Pullman (AUS)
- Daniel Santi (ARG)
- Virendra Singh (IND)
- Rob ten Cate (NED)

== Results ==
All times are Pakistan Standard Time (UTC+05:00)

=== Pool ===
Pos	Team	Pld	W	D	L	GF	GA	GD	Pts
1	Spain	5	4	0	1	17	7	+10	12
2	Netherlands	5	4	0	1	21	13	+8	12
3	Pakistan	5	3	0	2	9	10	−1	9
4	India	5	1	1	3	9	13	−4	4
5	Germany	5	1	1	3	6	13	−7	4
6	New Zealand	5	0	2	3	6	13	−7	2

Source: FIH

4 December 2004
10:00

New Zealand	2–5	Netherlands
Hari 29', 42'	Report	Taekema 26', 50'; R. Brouwer 31'; Reckers 44'; Klaver 60'

Umpires:
Hamish Jamson (ENG)
Muhammad Faiz (PAK)

4 December 2004
12:00

India	0–4	Spain
	Report	Fàbregas 43'; Arbós 60'; Freixa 63'; Escarré 64'

Umpires:
Tim Pullman (AUS)
Ged Curran (SCO)

4 December 2004
15:00

Pakistan	3–1	Germany
Abbas 34'; Abbasi 52'; Jawad 64'	Report	Montag 40'

Umpires:
Rob ten Cate (NED)
Daniel Santi (ARG)

5 December 2004
10:00

Netherlands	5–4	India
G. Derikx 10'; Taekema 16'; De Nooijer 25', 59'; Klaver 34'	Report	Michael 5'; Vakkaliga Swamy 20'; Halappa 45'; Pillay 61'

Umpires:
Rashad Butt (PAK)
Daniel Santi (ARG)

5 December 2004
13:00

Germany	2–5	Spain
Keller 25', 55'	Report	Sala 20', 70+'; Escarré 40'; Arbós 41'; Quemada 67'

Umpires:
Hamish Jamson (ENG)
Rob ten Cate (NED)

5 December 2004
15:00

New Zealand	1–3	Pakistan
Archibald 39'	Report	Abbasi 49'; Abbas 53', 55'

Umpires:
Virendra Singh (IND)
Ged Curran (SCO)

7 December 2004
10:30

Spain	3–1	New Zealand
Quemada 40', 54'; Freixa 63'	Report	Smith 46'

Umpires:
Rashad Butt (PAK)
Virendra Singh (IND)

7 December 2004
12:30

Pakistan	1–4	Netherlands
Abbas 19'	Report	R. Brouwer 15'; Taekema 39'; Klaver 65'; Delmee 68'

Umpires:
Ged Curran (SCO)
Tim Pullman (AUS)

7 December 2004
14:30

India	3–1	Germany
Michael 40'; Halappa 58'; Gupta 67'	Report	Montag 20'

Umpires:
Muhammad Faiz (PAK)
Hamish Jamson (ENG)

8 December 2004
11:00

Netherlands	4–2	Spain
Klaver 15', 45', 69'; G. Derikx 18'	Report	Freixa 35'; Quemada 57'

Umpires:
Virendra Singh (IND)
Hamish Jamson (ENG)

8 December 2004
13:00

Germany	1–1	New Zealand
Montag 43'	Report	Burrows 25'

Umpires:
Rashad Butt (PAK)
Rob ten Cate (NED)

8 December 2004
15:00

Pakistan	2–1	India
Saqlain 32'; Abbas 66'	Report	Sandeep 57'

Umpires:
Tim Pullman (AUS)
Daniel Santi (ARG)

10 December 2004
09:00

Spain	3–0	Pakistan
Fàbregas 47'; D. Alegre 53'; Freixa 69'	Report

Umpires:
Ged Curran (SCO)
Rob ten Cate (NED)

10 December 2004
11:00

New Zealand	1–1	India
Smith 56'	Report	Halappa 62'

Umpires:
Muhammad Faiz (PAK)
Tim Pullman (AUS)

10 December 2004
15:00

Netherlands	3–4	Germany
Meijer 9'; Weusthof 35'; Taekema 41'	Report	Montag 18'; Hentschel 37'; Purps 60'; Wein 67'

Umpires:
Daniel Santi (ARG)
Rashad Butt (PAK)

=== Classification ===
==== Fifth and sixth place ====
12 December 2004
09:00

Germany	2–1	New Zealand
Keller 43', 53'	Report	Hari 69'

Umpires:
Virendra Singh (IND)
Muhammad Faiz (PAK)

==== Third and fourth place ====
12 December 2004
11:30

Pakistan	3–2	India
Abbas 4'; Butt 27'; Ali Khan 54'	Report	Sandeep 2', 65'

Umpires:
Rob ten Cate (NED)
Tim Pullman (AUS)

==== Final ====
12 December 2004
14:30

Spain	4–2	Netherlands
Quemada 18'; Freixa 51', 61'; Sojo 57'	Report	Taekema 42'; Klaver 60'

Umpires:
Hamish Jamson (ENG)
Ged Curran (SCO)

== Awards ==
Topscorer	Most Promising Player	Best Player	Best Goalkeeper
Karel Klaver (NED)	Shakeel Abbasi (PAK)	Karel Klaver (NED)	Guus Vogels (NED)

== Final standings ==
1. Spain
2. Netherlands
3. Pakistan
4. India
5. Germany
6. New Zealand
