= Rob Derikx =

Dutch field hockey player (born 1982)

Personal information
- Full name: Rob Gerard Marie Derikx
- Born: 25 August 1982 (age 44) 's-Hertogenbosch, Netherlands

Sport
- Sport: Field hockey
- Position: Midfielder
Senior career
Years	Team	Caps	Goals
–	Den Bosch	-	-
–	SCHC	-	-
National team
Years	Team	Caps	Goals
2001–2008	Netherlands	174	(3)
Medal record
Men's field hockey
Representing the Netherlands
Olympic Games
Silver medal – second place	2004 Athens	Team
World Cup
Bronze medal – third place	2002 Kuala Lumpur	Team
European Championship
Silver medal – second place	2005 Leipzig	Team
Gold medal – first place	2007 Manchester	Team
Champions Trophy
Gold medal – first place	2002 Cologne	Team
Gold medal – first place	2003 Amstelveen	Team
Silver medal – second place	2004 Lahore	Team
Bronze medal – third place	2001 Rotterdam	Team
Bronze medal – third place	2007 Kuala Lumpur	Team

Rob Gerard Marie Derikx (born 25 August 1982 in Den Bosch, North Brabant) is a field hockey player from the Netherlands. He won silver medal with the Dutch national squad at the 2004 Summer Olympics in Athens.

The midfielder made his debut on 18 April 2001, in a friendly match against Germany. The score for that match was 2–3. He played for Stichtse Cricket en Hockey Club in the Dutch League (Hoofdklasse) after a long time with HC Den Bosch. His older brother, Geert-Jan, was also a member of the Dutch field hockey squad. In 2003 Rob was nominated by the International Hockey Federation (FIH) for the Talent of the Year Award.
