= Timme Hoyng =

Dutch field hockey player

Personal information
- Full name: Timme Fred Philip Hoyng
- Born: 7 August 1976 (age 49) Amstelveen, Netherlands
- Height: 1.81 m (5 ft 11 in)
- Weight: 80 kg (176 lb)

Sport
- Sport: Field hockey
- Position: Midfielder / Forward
Youth career
- Team
- –: Randwijck
- 1988–1994: Amsterdam
Senior career
Years	Team	Caps	Goals
1994–1998	Amsterdam	-	-
1998–1999	Hurley	-	-
1999–	Amsterdam	-	-
–	Roma	-	-
–2009	Amsterdam	-	-
2009–2013	Pinoké	-	-
National team
Years	Team	Caps	Goals
2000–2009	Netherlands	138	(12)
Medal record
Men's field hockey
Representing the Netherlands
European Championship
Gold medal – first place	2007 Manchester
Silver medal – second place	2005 Leipzig
Champions Trophy
Gold medal – first place	2006 Terrassa
Silver medal – second place	2004 Lahore
Silver medal – second place	2005 Chennai
Bronze medal – third place	2007 Kuala Lumpur

Timme Fred Philip Hoyng (born 7 August 1976) is a Dutch former field hockey player who played as a midfielder or forward.

Hoyng played a total of 138 matches for the Dutch national team from 2000 until 2009 in which he scored 12 goals. He was a member of the national team that finished fourth at the 2008 Summer Olympics.
