= Pol Amat =

Spanish field hockey player

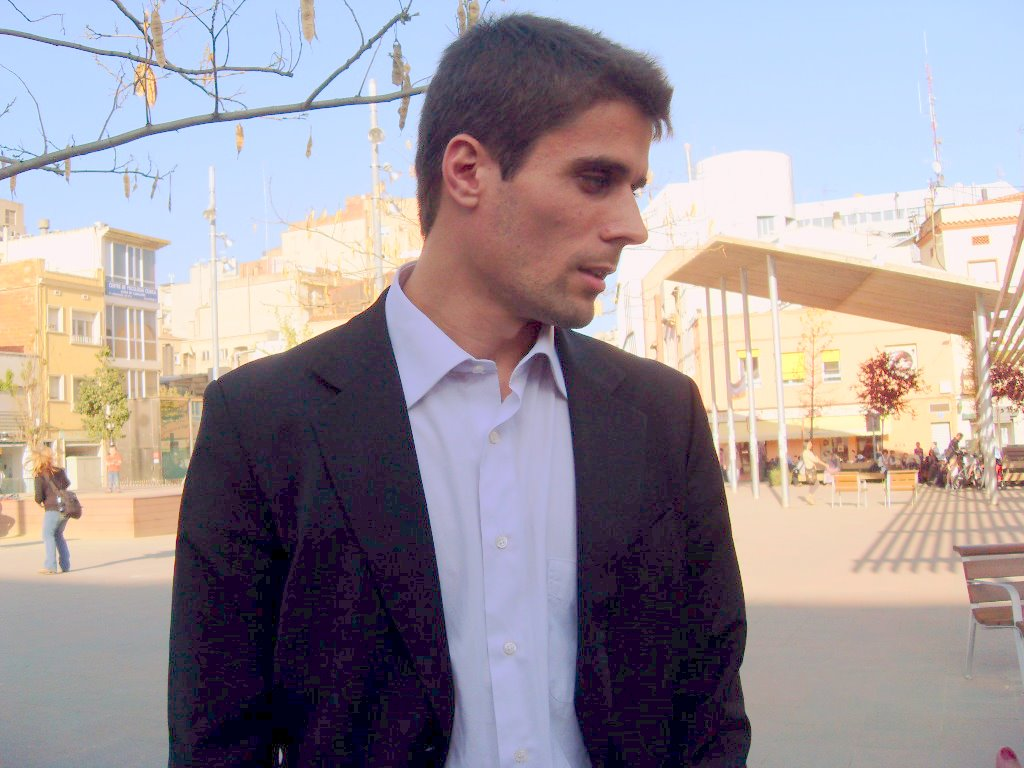

Personal information
- Full name: Pablo Amat Escudé
- Born: 18 June 1978 (age 48) Barcelona, Catalonia, Spain
Medal record
Men's field hockey
Representing Spain
Olympic Games
Silver medal – second place	1996 Atlanta	Team
Silver medal – second place	2008 Beijing	Team
World Cup
Silver medal – second place	1998 Utrecht	Team
Bronze medal – third place	2006 Mönchengladbach	Team
European Championship
Gold medal – first place	2005 Leipzig	Team
Silver medal – second place	2007 Manchester	Team
Champions Trophy
Gold medal – first place	2004 Lahore	Team
Bronze medal – third place	2005 Chennai	Team
Bronze medal – third place	2006 Terrassa	Team
Champions Challenge
Gold medal – first place	2003 Johannesburg	Team

Pablo "Pol" Amat Escudé (born 18 June 1978 in Barcelona, Catalonia, Spain) is a Spanish retired field hockey player, who played as a striker. In 2008 he was awarded World Hockey Player of the Year, becoming the first Spaniard to win the award.

== Career ==
=== National team ===
Amat made his international debut at the age of 17 in 1995 before being selected for the Atlanta Olympics in 1996. That year, Spain won silver with Amat playing alongside legends such as Juan Escarré and Javier Arnau.

After competing for Spain in both the Sydney 2000 and Athens 2004 Olympics, he won another silver medal in Beijing 2008. He was also part of the Spanish team at the 2012 Summer Olympics.

The striker won his first major title with the Spaniards at the 2004 Champions Trophy in Lahore. Arguably Amat's finest hour came in the final of the 2005 European Nations Cup. With Spain trailing Netherlands 2–1, Santi Freixa grabbed an equaliser with less than three minutes to go. The stage was set for Amat, who produced two goals in less than a minute to seal a 4–2 victory, giving Spain a title that had eluded them for 31 years.

Amat also scored a memorable golden goal at the 2006 World Cup when he brilliantly flicked the ball over the South Korean goalkeeper to claim the bronze medal for Spain.

Awards
Preceded by (Australia) Jamie Dwyer	World Hockey Player of the Year; 2008	Succeeded by (Australia) Jamie Dwyer
