= Jesse Mahieu =

Former Dutch field hockey player and current coach

Personal information
- Born: 12 August 1978 (age 47) Best, Netherlands

Sport
- Sport: Field hockey
- Position: Defender
- Club: Amsterdam (Head coach)
National team
Years	Team	Caps	Goals
2002–2006	Netherlands	50	(0)
Coaching career
- Years: Team
- 2016–present: Amsterdam
- 2017–2025: Pinoké
Medal record
Men's field hockey
Representing the Netherlands
Olympic Games
Silver medal – second place	2004 Athens	Team
European Championship
Silver medal – second place	2005 Leipzig
Champions Trophy
Silver medal – second place	2004 Lahore

Jesse Mahieu (born 12 August 1978) is a Dutch former field hockey player and the current head coach of Hoofdklasse club Amsterdam.

Mahieu made a total of 50 appearances for the Netherlands national team from 2002 to 2006. He won the silver medal with the national team at the 2004 Summer Olympics in Athens.
