= Thomas Boerma =

Dutch field hockey player (born 1981)

Personal information
- Born: 7 May 1981 (age 45) Laren, North Holland, Netherlands
- Height: 1.80 m (5 ft 11 in)
- Weight: 72 kg (159 lb)

Sport
- Sport: Field hockey
- Position: Defender
Senior career
Years	Team	Caps	Goals
–2004	Kampong	-	-
2004–2011	Bloemendaal	-	-
–	Breda	-	-
National team
Years	Team	Caps	Goals
2005–2009	Netherlands	66	(0)
Medal record
Men's field hockey
Representing the Netherlands
EuroHockey Championship
Gold medal – first place	2007 Manchester
Champions Trophy
Gold medal – first place	2006 Terrassa
Bronze medal – third place	2007 Kuala Lumpur

Thomas Boerma (born 7 May 1981) is a Dutch former field hockey player.

== Club career ==
Boerma played for Kampong until 2004 when he joined Bloemendaal. He won five Hoofdklasse titles with Bloemendaal and the Euro Hockey League in 2008–09. From 2011 onwards he played for Breda where he ended his career.

== International career ==
Boerma was part of the Dutch national team for the 2006 Champions Trophy in Terrassa where the Dutch won the gold. In 2007, he also was part of the team that won the gold medal at the European Championships in Manchester. In Kuala Lumpur later in 2007, he won the bronze medal at the Champions Trophy, while in 2008 they only finished in fourth place in Rotterdam. He also is part of the Dutch team that qualified for the 2008 Summer Olympics.
