= 2006 Men's Hockey Champions Trophy =

Tournament details
- Host country: Spain
- City: Terrassa
- Dates: 22–30 July
- Teams: 6
- Venue: Atlètic Terrassa

Final positions
- Champions: Netherlands (8th title)
- Runner-up: Germany
- Third place: Spain

Tournament statistics
- Matches played: 18
- Goals scored: 91 (5.06 per match)
- Top scorer(s): (Spain) Santi Freixa (Netherlands) Taeke Taekema (8 goals)
- Best player: (Netherlands) Teun de Nooijer

The 2006 Men's Hockey Champions Trophy was the 28th edition of the Hockey Champions Trophy, an annual international men's field hockey tournament organized by the FIH. It was held in Terrassa, Catalonia, Spain from 22 to 30 July 2006.

The Netherlands won the tournament after beating Germany 2–1 in the final.

== Squads ==
Argentina

Head Coach: Sergio Vigil

1. Juan Manuel Vivaldi (GK)
3. Juan Martín López
4. Matías Vila
5. Ezequiel Paulón
6. Mariano Chao (GK)
7. Mario Almada
9. Rodrigo Vila
10. Tomás MacCormik
11. Lucas Cammareri
12. Marcos Riccardi
14. Fernando Zylberberg
15. Germán Orozco (c)
17. Matías Paredes
19. Matías Cammareri
20. Tomás Argento
21. Lucas Vila
22. Matías Rey
26. Pedro Ibarra
Australia

Head Coach: Colin Batch

1. Jamie Dwyer (c)
2. Liam de Young
3. Michael Boyce
4. Michael McCann
5. Troy Elder
6. Robert Hammond
7. Nathan Eglington
9. Mark Knowles
13. Luke Doerner
14. Grant Schubert
15. Bevan George
18. Stephen Lambert (GK)
20. Matt Naylor
21. Aaron Hopkins
24. Travis Brooks
25. Brent Livermore
26. Dean Butler
30. Stephen Mowlam (GK)
Germany

Head Coach: Bernhard Peters

1. Christian Schulte (GK)
3. Philip Witte
4. Philipp Crone
7. Carlos Nevado
9. Moritz Fürste
10. Jan-Marco Montag
11. Björn Emmerling
12. Sebastian Biederlack
13. Justus Scharowsky
14. Tibor Weißenborn
16. Niklas Meinert
17. Timo Weß (c)
19. Christopher Zeller
22. Matthias Witthaus
25. Philipp Zeller
29. Sebastian Draguhn
30. Nicolas Emmerling
31. Tim Jessulat (GK)
Netherlands

Head Coach: Roelant Oltmans

1. Guus Vogels (GK)
3. Geert-Jan Derikx
4. Karel Klaver
6. Thomas Boerma
7. Sander van der Weide
8. Ronald Brouwer
10. Taeke Taekema
12. Jeroen Delmee (c)
13. Klaas Veering (GK)
14. Teun de Nooijer
15. Eby Kessing
16. Floris Evers
18. Rob Reckers
19. Matthijs Brouwer
21. Nick Meijer
22. Roderick Weusthof
23. Timme Hoyng
24. Robert van der Horst
Pakistan

Head Coach: Asif Bajwa

1. Rehan Butt
2. Ehsan Ullah
4. Ali Ghazanfar (c)
5. Muhammad Saqlain
7. Dilawar Hussain
8. Adnan Maqsood
9. Sohail Abbas
10. Salman Akbar (GK)
11. Zubair Muhammad
12. Nasir Ahmed (GK)
15. Shakeel Abbasi
16. Adnan Zakir
17. Akhtar Ali
19. Muhammad Imran
20. Waseem Ahmed
22. Zeeshan Ashraf
23. Waqas Sharif
31. Saleem Khalid
Spain

Head Coach: Maurits Hendriks

1. Bernardino Herrera (GK)
2. Santi Freixa
3. Miquel Delas
4. Oriol Freixa
5. Francisco "Kiko" Fábregas (c)
8. Alex Fàbregas
9. Pol Amat
10. Eduard Tubau
13. Ramón Alegre
14. Héctor González
15. Víctor Sojo
16. Xavier Ribas
17. Albert Sala
18. Rodrigo Garza
19. Pau Quemada
20. Sergi Enrique
22. Francisco Cortés (GK)
23. David Alegre

== Results ==
All times are Central European Summer Time (UTC+02:00)

=== Pool ===
Pos	Team	Pld	W	D	L	GF	GA	GD	Pts	Qualification
1	Netherlands	5	3	2	0	21	11	+10	11	Final
2	Germany	5	2	3	0	14	11	+3	9	Final
3	Spain (H)	5	2	2	1	13	11	+2	8	Third place game
4	Australia	5	2	1	2	16	12	+4	7	Third place game
5	Pakistan	5	1	1	3	11	19	−8	4	Fifth place game
6	Argentina	5	0	1	4	5	16	−11	1	Fifth place game

(H) Hosts

22 July 2006
15:30

Australia	3–2	Pakistan
McCann 2'; Elder 41', 56'	Report	Abbas 32', 53'

Umpires:
Satinder Kumar (IND)
Erik Klein Nagelvoort (NED)

22 July 2006
17:45

Spain	1–1	Germany
Freixa 65'	Report	Weißenborn 4'

Umpires:
David Leiper (SCO)
Tim Pullman (AUS)

22 July 2006
20:00

Netherlands	4–2	Argentina
Taekema 25', 57', 63'; De Nooijer 55'	Report	Rey 42'; L. Cammareri 59'

Umpires:
Xavier Adell (ESP)
Hamish Jamson (ENG)

23 July 2006
16:00

Pakistan	3–3	Germany
Abbas 27', 38'; Abbasi 57'	Report	Zeller 2', 22'; Witthaus 68'

Umpires:
Xavier Adell (ESP)
Daniel Santi (ARG)

23 July 2006
18:00

Argentina	1–1	Spain
Argento 70'	Report	Freixa 18'

Umpires:
Hamish Jamson (ENG)
Syad Haider (PAK)

23 July 2006
20:00

Australia	1–1	Netherlands
Elder 29'	Report	Taekema 35'

Umpires:
David Leiper (SCO)
Satinder Kumar (IND)

25 July 2006
16:00

Netherlands	9–2	Pakistan
M. Brouwer 1'; Evers 14'; Reckers 26'; R. Brouwer 30', 44', 65', 70'; De Nooijer 42'; Taekema 58'	Report	Abbasi 43'; Zakir 53'

Umpires:
Tim Pullman (AUS)
Daniel Santi (ARG)

25 July 2006
18:00

Spain	5–3	Australia
Freixa 29', 44', 55'; Tubau 52'; Amat 61'	Report	Eglington 8'; McCann 18'; Schubert 22'

Umpires:
David Leiper (SCO)
Satinder Kumar (IND)

25 July 2006
20:00

Germany	3–1	Argentina
Witthaus 6'; Montag 21'; Nevado 59'	Report	Orozco 68'

Umpires:
Erik Klein Nagelvoort (NED)
Xavier Adell (ESP)

27 July 2006
16:00

Germany	3–3	Netherlands
Witthaus 3', 31'; Zeller 42'	Report	Reckers 10'; Klaver 18'; Taekema 55'

Umpires:
Xavier Adell (ESP)
Satinder Kumar (IND)

27 July 2006
18:00

Pakistan	2–3	Spain
Ali 29'; Abbas 68'	Report	Freixa 10', 60'; Enrique 70'

Umpires:
Erik Klein Nagelvoort (NED)
Tim Pullman (AUS)

27 July 2006
20:00

Argentina	0–6	Australia
	Report	Schubert 19'; Doerner 28', 32', 60'; Boyce 44'; McCann 66'

Umpires:
Syad Haider (PAK)
Hamish Jamson (ENG)

29 July 2006
16:00

Pakistan	2–1	Argentina
Butt 6'; Abbasi 29'	Report	M. Cammareri 69'

Umpires:
Satinder Kumar (IND)
Erik Klein Nagelvoort (NED)

29 July 2006
18:00

Spain	3–4	Netherlands
Sala 49'; Freixa 55'; Amat 58'	Report	Reckers 29', 70'; Weusthof 44'; Taekema 69'

Umpires:
Tim Pullman (AUS)
Hamish Jamson (ENG)

29 July 2006
20:00

Australia	3–4	Germany
Elder 12', 49', 54'	Report	Witthaus 8'; Zeller 45', 70+'; Füerste 55'

Umpires:
Xavier Adell (ESP)
Daniel Santi (ARG)

=== Classification ===
==== Fifth and sixth place ====
30 July 2006
13:00

Pakistan	3–1	Argentina
Butt 24', 34'; Abbas 40'	Report	Almada 51'

Umpires:
Tim Pullman (AUS)
Erik Klein Nagelvoort (NED)

==== Third and fourth place ====
30 July 2006
15:30

Spain	2–2 (a.e.t.)	Australia
Tubau 45'; Amat 62'	Report	Doerner 38'; Eglington 50'
Penalties
Freixa (penalty shoot-out scored); Sala (penalty shoot-out scored); Tubau (penalty shoot-out scored); Amat (penalty shoot-out scored); Ribas (penalty shoot-out scored)	5–4	(penalty shoot-out scored) Dwyer; (penalty shoot-out scored) Elder; (penalty shoot-out scored) Schubert; (penalty shoot-out scored) Hammond; (penalty shoot-out missed) Doerner

Umpires:
Hamish Jamson (ENG)
Syad Haider (PAK)

==== Final ====
30 July 2006
18:00

Netherlands	2–1	Germany
Taekema 20'; De Nooijer 33'	Report	Weß 41'

Umpires:
Xavier Adell (ESP)
Satinder Kumar (IND)

== Awards ==
Top scorers	Best Player	Best Young Player	Best Goalkeeper	Fair Play Trophy
(Spain) Santi Freixa (Netherlands) Taeke Taekema	(Netherlands) Teun de Nooijer	(Spain) Sergi Enrique	(Australia) Stephen Mowlam	Australia

== Final standings ==
1. Netherlands
2. Germany
3. Spain
4. Australia
5. Pakistan
6. Argentina

== See also ==
- 2006 Women's Hockey Champions Trophy
