= Klaas Veering =

Dutch field hockey player

Personal information
- Born: 26 September 1981 (age 44) Leiden, South Holland, Netherlands
Medal record
Men's field hockey
Representing the Netherlands
Olympic Games
Silver medal – second place	2004 Athens	Team
European Championship
Silver medal – second place	2005 Leipzig	Team
Champions Trophy
Gold medal – first place	2003 Amstelveen	Team
Gold medal – first place	2006 Terrassa	Team
Silver medal – second place	2004 Lahore	Team
Silver medal – second place	2005 Chennai	Team

Klaas Willem Veering (born 26 September 1981) is a field hockey goalkeeper from the Netherlands, who won the silver medal with the Dutch national team at the 2004 Summer Olympics in Athens. There he was the stand-in for first choice Guus Vogels.

The goalie made his debut on 23 February 2003 in a friendly match in and against Australia. He played for Amsterdam, with whom he won the title in the Dutch League (Hoofdklasse)four times (2003, 2004, 2011 and 2014).
