= Diego Avila (hockey) =

Argentine field hockey player (born 1980)

Diego Avila (born February 23, 1980, in Córdoba) is a field hockey midfielder from Argentina, who was a member of the Men's National Team that competed at the 2003 Champions Trophy in Amstelveen, Netherlands. He played club hockey for Cordóba HC in his home town.
