= Bernardino Herrera =

Spanish field hockey player (born 1977)

Personal information
- Full name: Bernardino Herrera Casanueva
- Born: 15 October 1977 (age 48) Santander, Spain

Sport
- Sport: Field hockey
- Position: Goalkeeper
Senior career
Years	Team	Caps	Goals
–	Club de Campo	-	-
National team
Years	Team	Caps	Goals
1998–2007	Spain		-
Medal record
Representing Spain
Men's field hockey
European Championship
Gold medal – first place	2005 Leipzig	Team
Silver medal – second place	2007 Manchester	Team
Champions Trophy
Gold medal – first place	2004 Lahore	Team
Bronze medal – third place	2005 Chennai	Team
Bronze medal – third place	2006 Terrassa	Team
Champions Challenge
Gold medal – first place	2003 Johannesburg	Team
Men's indoor field hockey
Indoor World Cup
Bronze medal – third place	2007 Vienna	Team

Bernardino Herrera Casanueva (born 15 October 1977 in Santander, Cantabria) is a field hockey goalkeeper from Spain. He earned his first cap for the Men's National Team in 1998 during the Champions Trophy tournament in Lahore, Pakistan. He is also the husband of the female hockey star Silvia Muñoz.

Herrera competed in two Summer Olympics for his native country, starting in 2000. There he finished in ninth position, followed by the fourth place in Athens. The goalie of Club de Campo Villa de Madrid won the title at the Champions Trophy in Lahore, and at the 2005 Men's Hockey European Nations Cup in Leipzig.
