= Jeroen Delmee =

Dutch field hockey player (born 1973)

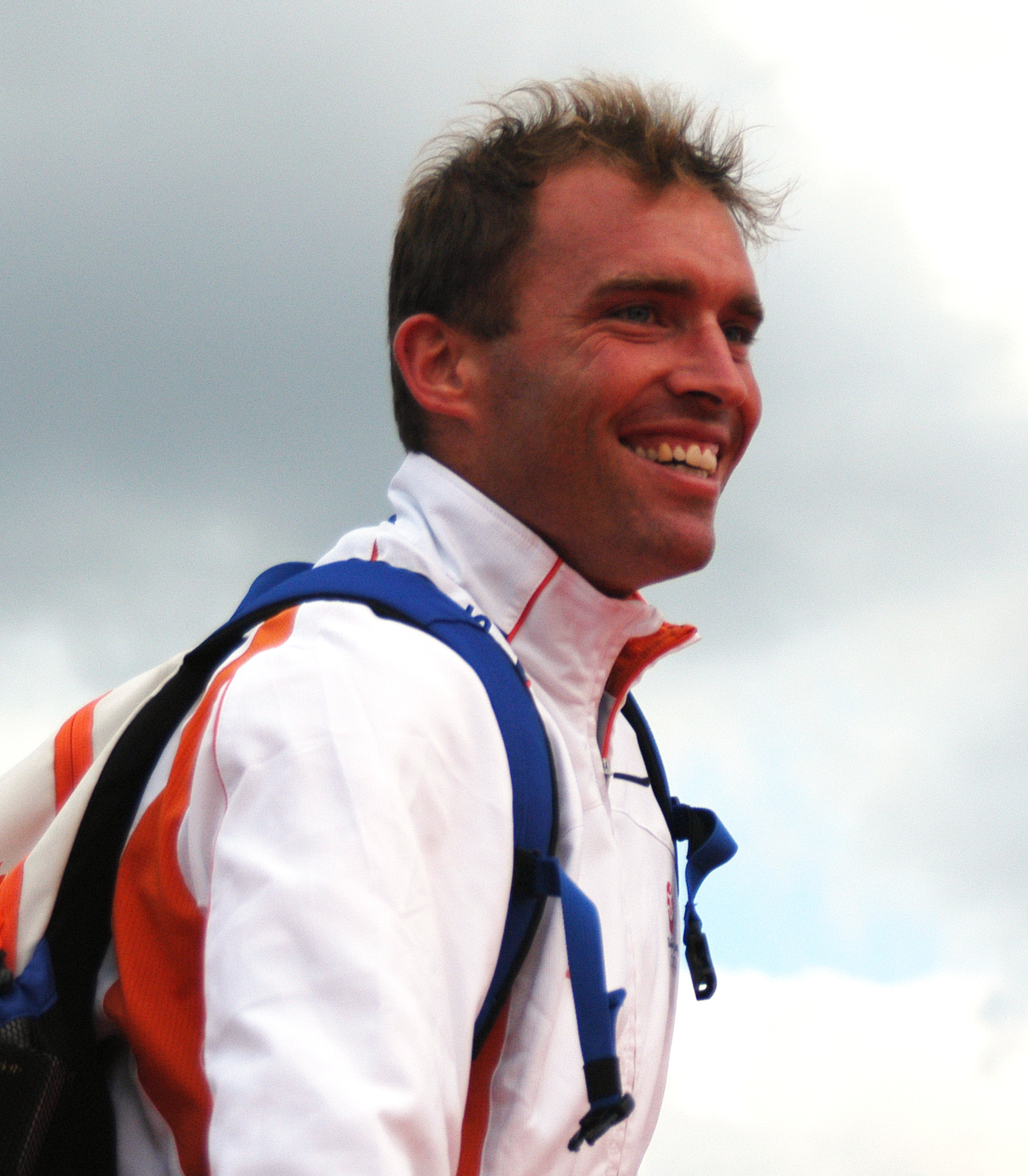

Medal record

Men's field hockey

Representing the Netherlands

Olympic Games
Gold medal – first place	1996 Atlanta	Team
Gold medal – first place	2000 Sydney	Team
Silver medal – second place	2004 Athens	Team

World Cup
Gold medal – first place	1998 Utrecht	Team

European Championship
Gold medal – first place	2007 Manchester	Team
Silver medal – second place	2005 Leipzig	Team

Champions Trophy
Gold medal – first place	2000 Amstelveen	Team
Gold medal – first place	2002 Cologne	Team
Gold medal – first place	2003 Amstelveen	Team
Gold medal – first place	2006 Terrassa	Team
Silver medal – second place	2004 Lahore	Team
Silver medal – second place	2005 Chennai	Team
Bronze medal – third place	1999 Brisbane	Team
Bronze medal – third place	2007 Kuala Lumpur	Team

Jeroen Petrus Maria Delmee (born 8 March 1973 in Boxtel) is a field hockey player from the Netherlands. Delmee was an Olympic champion for the Netherlands in the 1996 and 2000 Summer Olympics. After working as head coach of Dutch field hockey club Tilburg and head coach of the France men's national team (2017–2021), he started as the head coach of the Netherlands men's national team in September 2021. Delmee led the Dutch team to gold at the 2023 Men's EuroHockey Championship and the 2024 Summer Olympics. The last victory made him the first Dutch sportsperson in history to win Olympic gold both as a player and as a coach.

Olympic Games
Preceded by Mark Huizinga	Flagbearer for Netherlands; Beijing 2008	Succeeded by Dorian van Rijsselberghe
