= Wayne Denne =

South African field hockey player

Personal information
- Born: 5 March 1976 (age 50)
Medal record
Men's field hockey
Representing South Africa
Champions Challenge
Bronze medal – third place	2003 Johannesburg	Team

Wayne Denne (born 5 March 1976) is a field hockey player from South Africa, who was a member of the national squad that finished tenth at the 2004 Summer Olympics in Athens. He made his international debut for his native country in 1995, against Australia at the Indra Gandhi Gold Cup in India. The midfielder played for Western Province.

== International senior tournaments ==
- 1997 – World Cup Qualifier, Kuala Lumpur (9th)
- 1999 – All-Africa Games, Johannesburg (1st)
- 2002 – World Cup, Kuala Lumpur (13th)
- 2002 – Commonwealth Games, Manchester (4th)
- 2003 – Champions Challenge, Johannesburg (3rd)
- 2004 – Olympic Qualifier, Madrid (7th)
- 2004 – Summer Olympics, Athens (10th)
