= Geert-Jan Derikx =

Dutch field hockey player (born 1980)

Personal information
- Born: 31 October 1980 (age 45)
Medal record
Men's field hockey
Representing the Netherlands
Olympic Games
Silver medal – second place	2004 Athens	Team
European Championship
Gold medal – first place	2007 Manchester	Team
Silver medal – second place	2005 Leipzig	Team
Champions Trophy
Gold medal – first place	2002 Cologne	Team
Gold medal – first place	2003 Amstelveen	Team
Gold medal – first place	2006 Terrassa	Team
Silver medal – second place	2004 Lahore	Team
Silver medal – second place	2005 Chennai	Team
Bronze medal – third place	2007 Kuala Lumpur	Team

Geert-Jan Marie Derikx (born 31 October 1980 in Den Bosch, North Brabant) is a field hockey player from the Netherlands, who won the silver medal with the Dutch national squad at the 2004 Summer Olympics in Athens.

The defender made his debut on 1 May 2002 in a friendly match against Germany: 1-1. He plays for Stichtse Cricket en Hockey Club in the Dutch League (Hoofdklasse), after a long time spell with HC Klein Zwitserland in The Hague. His younger brother Rob is also a member of the Dutch field hockey squad. In the summer of 2007 he moved to Amsterdam.
