= James Nation =

New Zealand field hockey player

James Henry Nation (born 23 September 1976, in Waipukurau) is a field hockey player from New Zealand who earned his first cap for the national team, nicknamed The Black Sticks, in 2001 against Malaysia. The midfielder provides support at centre and left half and is also an attacking penalty corner option. He made his test debut in 2001, but did not make the team to the Commonwealth Games a year later. He had over 105 caps for the team and was a very experienced player in the squad at the time.

Nation represented his native country at two Summer Olympics: in 2004 in Athens and 2008 in Beijing.

Nation plays representative hockey for Wellington and was part of the team that won the national title in 2002. The resident of Dunedin plays for Kings United Hockey club in the Otago premier men's league.

== International senior tournaments ==
- 2004 – Olympic Qualifying Tournament
- 2004 – Summer Olympics
- 2004 – Champions Trophy
- 2005 – Sultan Azlan Shah Cup
- 2006 – Commonwealth Games
- 2006 – World Cup
- 2008 – Olympic Games
