= Steve Evans (field hockey) =

South African field hockey player

Steve Evans (born 26 April 1976) is a South African former field hockey player who competed in the 2004 Summer Olympics.
