= Karel Klaver =

Dutch field hockey player

Personal information
- Born: 29 September 1978 (age 47)
Medal record
Men's field hockey
Representing the Netherlands
Olympic Games
Silver medal – second place	2004 Athens	Team
European Championship
Silver medal – second place	2005 Leipzig	Team
Champions Trophy
Gold medal – first place	2003 Amstelveen	Team
Gold medal – first place	2006 Terrassa	Team
Silver medal – second place	2004 Lahore	Team
Silver medal – second place	2005 Chennai	Team

Karel Klaver (born 29 September 1978 in Amsterdam, North Holland) is a field hockey player from the Netherlands, who won the silver medal with the national squad at the 2004 Summer Olympics in Athens.
