= Wayne McIndoe =

New Zealand field hockey player

Personal information
- Full name: Wayne Arthur McIndoe
- Born: 27 August 1972 (age 53) Paraparaumu, New Zealand
Medal record
Men's field hockey
Representing New Zealand
Commonwealth Games
Silver medal – second place	2002 Manchester	Team competition

Wayne Arthur McIndoe (born 27 August 1972 in Paraparaumu) is a field hockey player from New Zealand, who earned his first cap for the national team, nicknamed The Black Sticks, in 1998 at the Commonwealth Games in Kuala Lumpur.

== International senior tournaments ==
- 1998 – Commonwealth Games
- 1999 – Sultan Azlan Shah Cup
- 2000 – Sultan Azlan Shah Cup
- 2000 – Olympic Qualifying Tournament
- 2002 – Commonwealth Games
- 2003 – Sultan Azlan Shah Cup
- 2003 – Champions Challenge
- 2004 – Olympic Qualifying Tournament
- 2004 – Summer Olympics
- 2004 – Champions Trophy
