= Rodrigo Garza =

Spanish field hockey player (born 1979)

Personal information
- Full name: Rodrigo Garza Barbero
- Born: 3 December 1979 (age 46) Madrid, Spain

Sport
- Sport: Field hockey
- Position: Defender/midfielder
Senior career
Years	Team	Caps	Goals
–	San Pablo Valdeluz	-	-
–2004	Club de Campo	-	-
2004–2007	Den Bosch	-	-
2007–2009	Bloemendaal	-	-
2009–2011	HGC	-	-
National team
Years	Team	Caps	Goals
1998–2010	Spain		-
Medal record
Men's field hockey
Representing Spain
Olympic Games
Silver medal – second place	2008 Beijing	Team
European Championship
Gold medal – first place	2005 Leipzig	Team
Silver medal – second place	2003 Barcelona	Team
Silver medal – second place	2007 Manchester	Team
Champions Trophy
Gold medal – first place	2004 Lahore	Team
Bronze medal – third place	2005 Chennai	Team
Bronze medal – third place	2006 Terrassa	Team
Champions Challenge
Gold medal – first place	2003 Johannesburg	Team

Rodrigo Garza Barbero (born 3 December 1979 in Madrid) is a retired field hockey defender/midfielder from Spain. He represented his native country at three consecutive Summer Olympics, starting in 2000.

== Club career ==
After the Athens Games (2004), where the Spain finished in fourth position, Garza moved to The Netherlands, where he joined HC Den Bosch in the Dutch Premier League, called Hoofdklasse. He moved on to national champions HC Bloemendaal in the spring of 2007, and became champion of premier Dutch league in the 2008 and 2009 season, winning also the European Hockey League in his last season with the club. Since September 2009 he played for HGC, a Dutch team near The Hague, which is also in the Dutch Premier League.

Born and raised in Madrid, Spain, he started to play Hockey at his hometown school Colegio Valdeluz and then promoted through respective categories until reaching premier Spanish league "División de Honor" playing with San Pablo Valdeluz (later on Ssang Yong Valdeluz). He then moved to play for Club de Campo Villa de Madrid before arriving to the Netherlands.

== International career ==
Garza has been many times junior and senior champion and runner up in both field and indoor Hockey, participating in several Euro championships: Padua, Barcelona, Leipzig and Manchester. He has participated in two Hockey World Cups in Kuala Lumpur and Mönchengladbach. He achieved a major success by winning the first Champions Trophy for Spain in 2004 at the National Hockey Stadium in Lahore, Pakistan and ending runner up in 2008 edition celebrated in Rotterdam, the Netherlands.
