= Alex Fàbregas =

Spanish field hockey player (born 1980)

Personal information
- Full name: Alexandre Fàbregas Carné
- Born: 25 October 1980 (age 45) Barcelona, Spain
- Height: 184 cm (6 ft 0 in)
- Weight: 83 kg (183 lb)
Medal record
Men's field hockey
Representing Spain
Olympic Games
Silver medal – second place	2008 Beijing	Team
European Championship
Gold medal – first place	2005 Leipzig	Team
Silver medal – second place	2007 Manchester	Team
Champions Trophy
Gold medal – first place	2004 Lahore	Team
Silver medal – second place	2011 Auckland	Team
Bronze medal – third place	2005 Chennai	Team
Bronze medal – third place	2006 Terrassa	Team
Champions Challenge
Gold medal – first place	2003 Johannesburg	Team

Alexandre "Alex" Fábregas Carne (Note: In this Spanish name, the first or paternal surname is Fábregas and the second or maternal family name is Carne.) (born 25 October 1980 in Barcelona, Spain) is a former Spanish field hockey player who played for the Spain national team as midfielder.

He finished in fourth position with the Men's National Team at the 2004 Summer Olympics in Athens, Greece. He was also part of the Spanish team that won the silver medal at the 2008 Summer Olympics. He played club hockey for Real Club de Polo in his hometown of Barcelona.

He was the target of death threats and insults on Twitter during the 2012 Olympic Games after stating that he played for Spain because he "had no other choice".
