= Rob Reckers =

Dutch field hockey player (born 1981)

Medal record

Men's field hockey

Representing the Netherlands

Olympic Games
Silver medal – second place	2004 Athens	Team

European Championship
Gold medal – first place	2007 Manchester	Team
Silver medal – second place	2005 Leipzig	Team

Champions Trophy
Gold medal – first place	2002 Cologne	Team
Gold medal – first place	2003 Amstelveen	Team
Gold medal – first place	2006 Terrassa	Team
Silver medal – second place	2004 Lahore	Team
Silver medal – second place	2005 Chennai	Team
Bronze medal – third place	2007 Kuala Lumpur	Team

Rob Reckers (born 29 August 1981 in Eindhoven, North Brabant) is a field hockey player from the Netherlands, who won the silver medal with the Dutch national team at the 2004 Summer Olympics in Athens.
