= William Xalco =

Indian field hockey player (1984-)

William Xalxo
Personal information
- Born: 14 June 1984 (age 42) Sundergarh, Odisha, India
- Height: 5 ft 6 in (168 cm)

Sport
- Sport: Field hockey
- Position: Full-back
Senior career
Years	Team	Caps	Goals
–	Air India; Bharat Petroleum	-	-
National team
Years	Team	Caps	Goals
–	India		-
Medal record
Men's field hockey
Representing India
Asia Cup
Gold medal – first place	2007 Chennai	Team
Junior Asia Cup
Gold medal – first place	Karachi 2004

William Xalxo (born 14 June 1984) is a former Indian field hockey player who played as a defender for the national team. He was part of the Indian team that competed at the 2004 Summer Olympics.
