= Kevin Towns =

New Zealand field hockey player and coach

Kevin James Towns (born 6 September 1948) is a former field hockey player from New Zealand, who became a hockey coach after his active career. He led New Zealand Hockey Team to the silver medal at the 2002 Commonwealth Games in Manchester.
