= Eric Rose-Innes =

South African field hockey player

Eric Rose-Innes (born 8 April 1981) is a South African former field hockey player who competed in the 2004 Summer Olympics and in the 2008 Summer Olympics.
