= Netherlands men's national field hockey team =

Netherlands
- Nickname(s): Oranje
- Association: Royal Dutch Hockey Federation (Koninklijke Nederlandse Hockey Bond)
- Confederation: EHF (Europe)
- Head Coach: Jeroen Delmee
- Assistant coach(es): David Harte; Eric Verboom
- Manager: Bas Nieuweweme
- Captain: Thierry Brinkman
- Most caps: Teun de Nooijer (453)
- Top scorer: Paul Litjens (267)
Home	Away

FIH ranking
- Current: 5 (7 September 2026)

Olympic Games
- Appearances: 20 (first in 1928)
- Best result: (gold) 1st (1996, 2000, 2024)

World Cup
- Appearances: 16 (first in 1971)
- Best result: (gold) 1st (1973, 1990, 1998)

EuroHockey Championship
- Appearances: 20 (first in 1970)
- Best result: (gold) 1st (1983, 1987, 2007, 2015, 2017, 2021, 2023)
Medal record
Event	1st	2nd	3rd
Olympic Games	3	4	3
World Cup	3	4	3
EuroHockey Championship	7	8	4
Champions Trophy	8	6	9
Hockey World League	1	0	0
Pro League	3	1	1
Total	25	23	20
Olympic Games
Gold medal – first place	1996 Atlanta	Team
Gold medal – first place	2000 Sydney	Team
Gold medal – first place	2024 Paris	Team
Silver medal – second place	1928 Amsterdam	Team
Silver medal – second place	1952 Helsinki	Team
Silver medal – second place	2004 Athens	Team
Silver medal – second place	2012 London	Team
Bronze medal – third place	1936 Berlin	Team
Bronze medal – third place	1948 London	Team
Bronze medal – third place	1988 Seoul	Team
World Cup
Gold medal – first place	1973 Amstelveen	
Gold medal – first place	1990 Lahore	
Gold medal – first place	1998 Utrecht	
Silver medal – second place	1978 Buenos Aires	
Silver medal – second place	1994 Sydney	
Silver medal – second place	2014 The Hague	
Silver medal – second place	2018 Bhubaneswar	
Bronze medal – third place	2002 Kuala Lumpur	
Bronze medal – third place	2010 New Delhi	
Bronze medal – third place	2023 Bhubaneswar/Rourkela	
EuroHockey Championship
Gold medal – first place	1983 Amstelveen	
Gold medal – first place	1987 Moscow	
Gold medal – first place	2007 Manchester	
Gold medal – first place	2015 London	
Gold medal – first place	2017 Amstelveen	
Gold medal – first place	2021 Amstelveen	
Gold medal – first place	2023 Mönchengladbach	
Silver medal – second place	1970 Brussels	
Silver medal – second place	1978 Hannover	
Silver medal – second place	1991 Paris	
Silver medal – second place	1995 Dublin	
Silver medal – second place	1999 Padua	
Silver medal – second place	2005 Leipzig	
Silver medal – second place	2011 Mönchengladbach	
Silver medal – second place	2025 Mönchengladbach	
Bronze medal – third place	1974 Madrid	
Bronze medal – third place	2009 Amstelveen	
Bronze medal – third place	2013 Boom	
Bronze medal – third place	2019 Antwerp	
Champions Trophy
Gold medal – first place	1981 Karachi	
Gold medal – first place	1982 Amstelveen	
Gold medal – first place	1996 Madras	
Gold medal – first place	1998 Lahore	
Gold medal – first place	2000 Amstelveen	
Gold medal – first place	2002 Cologne	
Gold medal – first place	2003 Amstelveen	
Gold medal – first place	2006 Terrassa	
Silver medal – second place	1987 Amstelveen	
Silver medal – second place	Berlin	
Silver medal – second place	1990 Melbourne	
Silver medal – second place	2004 Lahore	
Silver medal – second place	2005 Chennai	
Silver medal – second place	2012 Melbourne	
Bronze medal – third place	1991 Berlin	
Bronze medal – third place	1993 Kuala Lumpur	
Bronze medal – third place	1994 Lahore	
Bronze medal – third place	1999 Brisbane	
Bronze medal – third place	2001 Rotterdam	
Bronze medal – third place	2007 Kuala Lumpur	
Bronze medal – third place	2010 Mönchengladbach	
Bronze medal – third place	2011 Auckland	
Bronze medal – third place	2018 Breda	
Hockey World League
Gold medal – first place	2012–13 New Delhi	Team

The Netherlands national men's field hockey team represents the Netherlands in international men's field hockey and is controlled by the Koninklijke Nederlandse Hockey Bond, the governing body for field hockey in the Netherlands.

The Netherlands are one of the most successful teams in the world, having won the Summer Olympics three times, the Hockey World Cup three times, the Champions Trophy eight times, the EuroHockey Nations Championship seven times, Pro League three times and the Hockey World League once.

== Tournament record ==
=== Summer Olympics ===
Summer Olympics record
Year	Round	Position	Pld	W	D*	L	GF	GA	Squad
(United Kingdom) 1908	did not participate								
(Belgium) 1920	did not participate								
(Netherlands) 1928	Final	2nd	4	2	1	1	8	5	Squad
(United States) 1932	did not participate								
(Nazi Germany) 1936	3rd place game	3rd	5	3	1	1	13	10	Squad
(United Kingdom) 1948	3rd place game	3rd	7	4	1	2	17	12	Squad
(Finland) 1952	Final	2nd	3	2	0	1	3	6	Squad
(Australia) 1956	Withdrew								
(Italy) 1960	9th–12th place pool	9th	6	3	1	2	11	10	Squad
(Japan) 1964	5th–8th play-off	7th	8	4	1	3	21	7	Squad
(Mexico) 1968	5th place game	5th	9	6	0	3	16	13	Squad
(West Germany) 1972	3rd place game	4th	9	5	1	3	21	14	Squad
(Canada) 1976	3rd place game	4th	7	5	0	2	14	8	Squad
(Soviet Union) 1980	Withdrew								
(United States) 1984	5th place game	6th	7	3	2	2	18	14	Squad
(South Korea) 1988	3rd place game	3rd	7	4	1	2	15	9	Squad
(Spain) 1992	3rd place game	4th	7	4	0	3	25	17	Squad
(United States) 1996	Final	1st	7	6	1	0	20	8	Squad
(Australia) 2000	Final	1st	7	2	4	1	14	11	Squad
(Greece) 2004	Final	2nd	7	6	0	1	20	13	Squad
(China) 2008	3rd place game	4th	7	3	2	2	19	13	Squad
(United Kingdom) 2012	Final	2nd	7	6	0	1	28	11	Squad
(Brazil) 2016	3rd place game	4th	8	4	2	2	24	10	Squad
(Japan) 2020	Quarter-finals	6th	6	2	2	2	15	15	Squad
(France) 2024	Final	1st	8	5	2	1	23	10	Squad
Total	20/25	3 titles	136	79	22	35	345	216	–

=== World Cup ===
FIH World Cup record
Year	Round	Position	Pld	W	D*	L	GF	GA	Squad
(Spain) 1971	5th place game	6th	6	3	0	3	6	6	N/A
(Netherlands) 1973	Final	1st	7	3	3	1	13	6	N/A
(Malaysia) 1975	9th place game	9th	7	3	1	3	17	10	N/A
(Argentina) 1978	Final	2nd	8	6	0	2	26	14	N/A
(India) 1982	3rd place game	4th	7	3	1	3	21	19	N/A
(England) 1986	7th place game	7th	7	5	0	2	13	8	N/A
(Pakistan) 1990	Final	1st	7	5	1	1	21	13	N/A
(Australia) 1994	Final	2nd	7	4	2	1	25	6	N/A
(Netherlands) 1998	Final	1st	7	6	0	1	26	14	Squad
(Malaysia) 2002	3rd place game	3rd	9	6	1	2	20	10	Squad
(Germany) 2006	7th place game	7th	7	4	1	2	21	12	Squad
(India) 2010	3rd place game	3rd	7	4	1	2	20	10	Squad
(Netherlands) 2014	Final	2nd	7	5	1	1	16	10	Squad
(India) 2018	Final	2nd	7	4	2	1	22	8	Squad
(India) 2023	3rd place game	3rd	6	5	1	0	32	4	Squad
(Belgium) (Netherlands) 2026	3rd place game	4th	7	4	1	2	21	12	Squad
Total	16/16	3 titles	113	70	16	27	320	162	–

=== European Championships ===
EuroHockey Championship record
Year	Host	Position	Pld	W	D	L	GF	GA	Squad
1970	Brussels, Belgium	2nd	7	5	1	1	12	5	—N/a
1974	Madrid, Spain	3rd	6	5	0	1	22	4	—N/a
1978	Hanover, West Germany	2nd	7	5	1	1	26	11	—N/a
1983	Amstelveen, Netherlands	1st	7	5	2	0	31	8	—N/a
1987	Moscow, Soviet Union	1st	7	5	1	1	21	5	—N/a
1991	Paris, France	2nd	7	6	0	1	41	5	—N/a
1995	(Republic of Ireland) Dublin, Ireland	2nd	7	5	2	0	21	7	—N/a
1999	Padua, Italy	2nd	7	5	2	0	32	9	—N/a
2003	Barcelona, Spain	4th	7	4	1	2	28	15	—N/a
2005	Leipzig, Germany	2nd	5	4	0	1	16	11	Squad
2007	Manchester, England	1st	5	5	0	0	23	9	Squad
2009	Amstelveen, Netherlands	3rd	5	3	0	2	22	6	Squad
2011	Mönchengladbach, Germany	2nd	5	4	0	1	25	14	Squad
2013	Boom, Belgium	3rd	5	4	0	1	22	9	Squad
2015	London, England	1st	5	5	0	0	19	1	Squad
2017	Amstelveen, Netherlands	1st	5	4	0	1	20	9	Squad
2019	Antwerp, Belgium	3rd	5	4	0	1	21	7	Squad
2021	Amstelveen, Netherlands	1st	5	2	3	0	15	6	Squad
2023	Mönchengladbach, Germany	1st	5	4	0	1	19	7	Squad
2025	Mönchengladbach, Germany	2nd	5	4	1	0	16	4	Squad
2027	London, England	qualified							
2029	Amstelveen, Netherlands	qualified							
Total		7 Titles	117	88	14	15	452	152	–

=== Champions Trophy ===
Champions Trophy record
Year	Position	Pld	W	D*	L	GF	GA
(Pakistan) 1978	did not participate						
(Pakistan) 1980	4th	6	3	0	3	23	19
(Pakistan) 1981	1st	5	3	2	0	22	16
(Netherlands) 1982	1st	5	4	1	0	21	10
(Pakistan) 1982	5th	5	2	0	3	11	13
(Pakistan) 1984	4th	5	2	1	2	9	8
(Australia) 1985	5th	5	1	1	3	10	11
(Pakistan) 1986	6th	5	1	1	3	5	10
(Netherlands) 1987	2nd	7	5	1	1	15	5
(Pakistan) 1988	did not participate						
(West Germany) 1989	2nd	5	4	0	1	12	6
(Australia) 1990	2nd	5	3	1	1	14	8
(Germany) 1991	3rd	5	2	1	2	12	10
(Pakistan) 1992	4th	6	3	0	3	13	11
(Malaysia) 1993	3rd	6	4	0	2	14	9
(Pakistan) 1994	3rd	6	1	3	2	15	14
(Germany) 1995	4th	6	3	0	3	7	8
(India) 1996	1st	6	4	2	0	13	5
(Australia) 1997	4th	6	2	1	3	14	15
(Pakistan) 1998	1st	6	5	0	1	22	11
(Australia) 1999	3rd	6	3	1	2	15	9
(Netherlands) 2000	1st	6	6	0	0	12	5
(Netherlands) 2001	3rd	6	3	1	2	16	13
(Germany) 2002	1st	6	4	2	0	21	9
(Netherlands) 2003	1st	6	5	1	0	27	13
(Pakistan) 2004	2nd	6	4	0	2	15	25
(India) 2005	2nd	6	3	1	2	14	12
(Spain) 2006	1st	6	4	2	0	23	12
(Malaysia) 2007	3rd	8	4	3	1	25	19
(Netherlands) 2008	4th	6	2	1	3	15	14
(Australia) 2009	4th	6	3	0	3	15	20
(Germany) 2010	3rd	6	3	0	3	17	19
(New Zealand) 2011	3rd	7	3	2	2	19	18
(Australia) 2012	2nd	6	4	1	1	16	9
(India) 2014	5th	6	3	1	2	17	11
(United Kingdom) 2016	Withdrew						
(Netherlands) 2018	3rd	6	3	1	2	15	7
Total	8 titles	199	109	32	58	534	404

=== Sultan Azlan Shah Cup ===
Sultan Azlan Shah Cup record
Year	Position
1996	6th
2006	1st
Best result: 1st place

=== Hockey World League ===
FIH Hockey World League record
Season	Position	Round	Pld	W	D*	L	GF	GA
2012–13	1st	Semifinal	6	4	1	1	25	12
2012–13	1st	Final	6	4	1	1	18	12
2014–15	4th	Semifinal	7	5	1	1	24	7
2014–15	4th	Final	6	3	2	1	15	11
2016–17	7th	Semifinal	7	7	0	0	28	3
2016–17	7th	Final	5	1	2	2	9	12
Total	1 title	Final	37	24	7	6	119	57

=== FIH Pro League ===
FIH Pro League record
Season	Position	Pld	W	D	L	GF	GA	Squad
(Netherlands) 2019	3rd	16	6	5	5	43	38	Squad
2020–21	5th	12	5	4	3	32	29	Squad
2021–22	1st	16	12	3	1	61	28	Squad
2022–23	1st	16	10	4	2	46	31	Squad
2023–24	2nd	16	8	5	3	45	32	Squad
2024–25	1st	16	7	7	2	38	29	Squad
2025–26	4th	16	7	5	4	47	37	Squad
Total	Best: 3 titles	92	48	28	16	265	187	

*Draws include knockout matches decided on a penalty shoot-out.

== Results and fixtures ==
The following is a list of match results in the last 12 months, as well as any future matches that have been scheduled.

Win Draw Loss Fixture

=== 2025 ===
09 December 2025 Argentina Leg	Netherlands	5–2	Pakistan	Santiago del Estero, Argentina
19:00	Bijen 12'; Boers 15', 44'; Reyenga 36'; Telgenkamp 41'	Report	Shahid 9'; Khan 18'	Stadium: Santiago del Estero Hockey Club

10 December 2025 Argentina Leg	Argentina	1–1 (4–2 p)	Netherlands	Santiago del Estero, Argentina
19:00	L. Toscani 40'	Report	Brinkman 12'	Stadium: Santiago del Estero Hockey Club
	Penalties
	Casella (penalty shoot-out missed); T. Domene (penalty shoot-out scored); L. Toscani (penalty shoot-out scored); Mendez (penalty shoot-out scored); Capurro (penalty shoot-out scored)		(penalty shoot-out scored) Croon; (penalty shoot-out missed) De Mol; (penalty shoot-out missed) Brinkman; (penalty shoot-out scored) Van Dam

12 December 2025 Argentina Leg	Pakistan	3–7	Netherlands	Santiago del Estero, Argentina
19:00	Khan 39', 60'; Rana 55'	Report	Dam 17'; Brinkman 22', 45'; Jansen 23', 51'; Boers 52'; Croon 59'	Stadium: Santiago del Estero Hockey Club

13 December 2025 Argentina Leg	Argentina	3–2	Netherlands	Santiago del Estero, Argentina
19:00	Domene 17', 30+'; Casella 27'	Report	Telgenkamp 33'; Reyenga 60'	Stadium: Santiago del Estero Hockey Club

=== 2026 ===
21 January 2026 Test 1	South Africa	0–5	Netherlands	Cape Town, South Africa
18:00 SAST		Report	van der Heijden ?'; Bijen ?', ?'; Brinkman ?' van Dam ?'	Stadium: Hartleyvale Stadium

23 January 2026 Test 2	South Africa	0–4	Netherlands	Cape Town, South Africa
15:00 SAST		Report	Bukkens ?', ?'; Reyenga ?'; Brinkman ?'	Stadium: Hartleyvale Stadium

5 February 2026 Spain Leg	Spain	3–4	Netherlands	Valencia, Spain
11:00	Vizcaino 10'; Pe. Cunill 15'; N. Álvarez 60'	Report	Van der Heijden 27'; Van Dam 42'; Brinkman 48'; Reyenga 59'	Stadium: Estadio Beteró

6 February 2026 Spain Leg	England	2–2 (3–1 p)	Netherlands	Valencia, Spain
11:00	Wallace 8'; Hooper 10'	Report	Reyenga 22'; Bukkens 57'	Stadium: Estadio Beteró
	Penalties
	Calnan (penalty shoot-out scored); Rushmere (penalty shoot-out scored); Albery (penalty shoot-out missed); Wallace (penalty shoot-out scored)		(penalty shoot-out missed) Bukkens; (penalty shoot-out scored) Croon; (penalty shoot-out missed) Brinkman; (penalty shoot-out missed) van Dam

8 February 2026 Spain Leg	Spain	2–3	Netherlands	Valencia, Spain
11:00	Basterra 36'; Abajo 39'	Report	Heijden 24'; Telgenkamp 25', 58'	Stadium: Estadio Beteró

9 February 2026 Spain Leg	Netherlands	2–2 (3–4 p)	England	Valencia, Spain
11:00	Jansen 23'; De Geus 34'	Report	Croft 28', 60'	Stadium: Estadio Beteró
	Penalties
	Reyenga (penalty shoot-out scored); Telgenkamp (penalty shoot-out missed); De Mol (penalty shoot-out missed); Middendorp (penalty shoot-out missed); Reyenga (penalty shoot-out scored); Van Dam (penalty shoot-out scored); Van Dam (penalty shoot-out missed)		(penalty shoot-out missed) Calnan; (penalty shoot-out missed) Rushmere; (penalty shoot-out scored) Albery; (penalty shoot-out missed) Wallace; (penalty shoot-out scored) Wallace; (penalty shoot-out scored) Payton; (penalty shoot-out scored) Albery

13 June 2026 Netherlands Leg	Netherlands	2–2 (0–1 p)	Germany	Rotterdam, Netherlands
16:00	Janssen 54'; Telgenkamp 54'	Report	Hellwig 25'; Schwarzhaupt 48'	Stadium: Hazelaarweg Stadion
	Penalties
	Bukkens (penalty shoot-out missed); Brinkman (penalty shoot-out missed); Middendorp (penalty shoot-out missed); Veen (penalty shoot-out missed); Janssen (penalty shoot-out missed)		(penalty shoot-out missed) Weigand; (penalty shoot-out missed) Struthoff; (penalty shoot-out scored) Rühr; (penalty shoot-out missed) Warweg

14 June 2026 Netherlands Leg	Netherlands	3–2	India	Rotterdam, Netherlands
16:00	Bukkens 3'; Bijen 23'; Reyenga 40'	Report	Dilpreet 10'; Sukhjeet 33'	Stadium: Hazelaarweg Stadion

20 June 2026 Netherlands Leg	Netherlands	5–3	Germany	Rotterdam, Netherlands
15:30	de Vilder 2'; Janssen 13', 14'; Brinkman 31'; Telgenkamp 56'	Report	Warweg 24'; Hellwig 35'; Hinrichs 59'	Stadium: Hazelaarweg Stadion

21 June 2026 Netherlands Leg	Netherlands	2–3	India	Rotterdam, Netherlands
14:00	Heijden 19'; Bijen 59'	Report	Jugraj 18'; Abhishek 27'; Rajinder 56'	Stadium: Hazelaarweg Stadion

23 June 2026 Belgium Leg	Australia	2–0	Netherlands	Wavre, Belgium
18:00	Brand 14'; Hayward 31'	Report		Stadium: Stade Justin Peeters

24 June 2026 Belgium Leg	Belgium	2–2 (4–3 p)	Netherlands	Wavre, Belgium
21:00	Hendrickx 3'; Boon 53'	Report	Van der Heijden 15', 16'	Stadium: Stade Justin Peeters
	Penalties
	Boon (penalty shoot-out missed); Sloover (penalty shoot-out scored); Wegnez (penalty shoot-out scored) van Dessel (penalty shoot-out scored) van Oost (penalty shoot-out scored)		(penalty shoot-out missed) de Mol; (penalty shoot-out missed) de Geus; (penalty shoot-out scored) Middendorp; (penalty shoot-out scored) Veen; (penalty shoot-out scored) Reyenga

26 June 2026 Belgium Leg	Netherlands	6–3	Australia	Wavre, Belgium
21:00	Janssen 12', 60'; Telgenkamp 17', 23' de Vilder 25'; Reyenga 45'	Report	Willott 20'; Ephraums 52'; Howard 59'	Stadium: Stade Justin Peeters

27 June 2026 Belgium Leg	Belgium	2–1	Netherlands	Wavre, Belgium
19:00	Hendrickx 15+'; Boon 17'	Report	Reyenga 36'	Stadium: Stade Justin Peeters

24 July 2026 Friendly match 1	Netherlands	5–0	France	Amstelveen, Netherlands
				Stadium: Wagener Stadium

25 July 2026 Friendly match 2	Netherlands	2–2	France	Amstelveen, Netherlands
				Stadium: Wagener Stadium

31 July 2026 Friendly match 1	Netherlands	1–0	Germany

2 August 2026 Friendly match 2	Netherlands	1–1	Germany

16 August 2026 World Cup Pool A	Netherlands	5–1	New Zealand	Amstelveen, Netherlands
16:00	Hoedemakers 35', 50'; Telgenkamp 41'; Brinkman 49'; Bijen 52'	Report	Hickson 24'	Stadium: Wagener Stadium

18 August 2026 World Cup Pool A	Argentina	1–3	Netherlands	Amstelveen, Netherlands
18:00	Della Torre 11'	Report	Brinkman 7'; Reyenga 34'; Telgenkamp 42'	Stadium: Wagener Stadium

20 August 2026 World Cup Pool A	Netherlands	4–1	Japan	Amstelveen, Netherlands
18:00	van Dam 12'; Janssen 50'; Reyenga 55', 56'	Report	Matsumoto 8'	Stadium: Wagener Stadium

22 August 2026 World Cup Pool E	Netherlands	3–1	India	Amstelveen, Netherlands
16:00	Telgenkamp 41'; Hoedemakers 51'; Van Dam 55'	Report	Harmanpreet 52'	Stadium: Wagener Stadium

24 August 2026 World Cup Pool E	Netherlands	2–2	England	Amstelveen, Netherlands
18:00	Janssen 30'; Brinkman 32'	Report	Rushmere 6'; Croft 48'	Stadium: Wagener Stadium

28 August 2026 World Cup Semi final	Netherlands	3–4	Spain	Amstelveen, Netherlands
18:00	Bijen 22'; Janssen 57' de Mol 59'	Report	Basterra 41', 50', 55'; Cunill 51'	Stadium: Wagener Stadium

30 August 2026 World Cup Third place match	Netherlands	1–2	Argentina	Wavre, Belgium
14:00	Middendorp 49'	Report	Domene 41'; Rey 59'	Stadium: Belfius Hockey Arena

== Team ==
=== Current squad ===
Roster for the 2026 Men's FIH Hockey World Cup.

Head coach: Jeroen Delmée

1. Maurits Visser (GK)
2. Jip Janssen
4. Lars Balk
6. Jonas de Geus
7. Thijs van Dam
8. Thierry Brinkman (C)
9. Koen Bijen
10. Jorrit Croon
11. Terrance Pieters
12. Justen Blok
14. Derck de Vilder
16. Floris Wortelboer
19. Tjep Hoedemakers
20. Derk Meijer (GK)
22. Pepijn van der Heijden
23. Joep de Mol
24. Steijn van Heijningen
29. Tijmen Reyenga
51. Duco Telgenkamp
77. Floris Middendorp

=== Records ===
As of 6 April 2022
Players in bold are still active with the national team.

==== Most capped players ====
Rank	Name	Caps	Goals	Career
1	Teun de Nooijer	453	217	1994–2012
2	Jeroen Delmee	401	10	1994–2008
3	Jacques Brinkman	339	80	1987–2000
4	Erik Jazet	310	9	1990–2004
5	Cees Jan Diepeveen	286	16	1978–1992
6	Stephan Veen	277	113	1989–2000
7	Robert van der Horst	272	14	2004–2016
8	Sander van der Weide	271	8	1996–2008
9	Jeroen Hertzberger	267	127	2007–2024
10	Guus Vogels	264	0	1996–2010

==== Top goalscorers ====
Rank	Name	Goals	Caps	Ratio	Career
1	Paul Litjens	267	177	1.51	1970–1982
2	Taeke Taekema	221	243	0.91	2000–2012
3	Teun de Nooijer	217	453	0.48	1994–2012
4	Floris Jan Bovelander	212	241	0.88	1985–1996
5	Ties Kruize	166	202	0.82	1971–1986
6	Bram Lomans	140	206	0.68	1995–2007
7	Jeroen Hertzberger	127	267	0.48	2007–2024
8	Mink van der Weerden	115	191	0.6	2010–2021
9	Taco van den Honert	114	215	0.53	1987–1996
10	Stephan Veen	113	277	0.41	1989–2000

==== Notable players ====
- Floris Evers
- Guus Vogels
- Marc Delissen
- Remco van Wijk
- Taeke Taekema
- Teun de Nooijer
- Taco van den Honert

== See also ==
- Netherlands men's national under-21 field hockey team
- Netherlands women's national field hockey team
- Netherlands–Pakistan field hockey record
