= V. S. Vinaya =

Indian field hockey player

Personal information
- Born: 24 November 1985 (age 40) Kodagu district, Karnataka, India

Sport
- Sport: Field hockey
- Position: Midfielder
National team
| Years | Team | Caps | Goals |
| – | India | | - |
- Updated on 25 July 2016

Vakkaliga Swamy Vinaya (born 24 November 1985) is a former Indian field hockey player who played as a midfielder for the national team. Among the major tournaments he represented India at include 2005 Men's Hockey Champions Trophy and 2006 Asian Games. Vinaya's "capability in one-on-one situations" received praise from German hockey coach Valentin Altenburg. In 2010, Vinaya signed up for World Series Hockey.

Apart from hockey, Vinaya represents his club Air India in cricket in the second division league.
