= Niklas Meinert =

German field hockey player

Personal information
- Born: 1 May 1981 (age 45)
Medal record
Men's field hockey
Representing Germany
Olympic Games
Gold medal – first place	2008 Beijing	Team

Niklas Meinert (born 1 May 1981 in Bad Kreuznach, Rhineland-Palatinate) is a field hockey midfielder from Germany, who played for Mannheimer HC. He made his international senior debut for the Men's National Team on 23 March 2003 in a friendly match against Pakistan in Ipoh, Malaysia. As of 23 March 2008, Meinert earned 109 caps for his native country, in which he scored 16 goals.

== International senior tournaments ==
- 2003 – Champions Trophy, Amstelveen (6th place)
- 2004 – Champions Trophy, Lahore (5th place)
- 2005 – European Nations Cup, Leipzig (3rd place)
- 2005 – Champions Trophy, Chennai (4th place)
- 2006 – 11th World Cup, Mönchengladbach (1st place)
- 2007 – European Nations Cup, Manchester (4th place)
- 2007 – Champions Trophy, Kuala Lumpur (1st place)
