= Kanwalpreet Singh (field hockey) =

Indian field hockey player (born 1981)

Personal information
- Born: 28 December 1981 (age 44) Jalandhar, Punjab, India

Sport
- Sport: Field hockey
- Position: Defender
National team
| Years | Team | Caps | Goals |
| – | India | | - |
Medal record
Men's field hockey
Representing India
Asia Cup
| Gold medal – first place | 2003 Kuala Lumpur | Team |
Junior World Cup
| Gold medal – first place | 2001 Hobart | Team |

Kanwalpreet Singh (born 28 December 1981) is a former Indian field hockey player who played as a defender for the national team. He represented India at the 2006 Men's Hockey World Cup, 2006 Asian Games and 2006 Commonwealth Games. He works for the Punjab Police.
