= Guus Vogels =

Dutch field hockey player

Medal record

Men's field hockey

Representing Netherlands

Olympic Games
| Gold medal – first place | 1996 Atlanta | Team |
| Gold medal – first place | 2000 Sydney | Team |
| Silver medal – second place | 2004 Athens | Team |

World Championship
| Bronze medal – third place | 2002 Kuala Lumpur | Team |
| Bronze medal – third place | 2010 New Delhi | Team |

European Championship
| Gold medal – first place | 2007 Manchester | Team |
| Silver medal – second place | 2005 Leipzig | Team |

Champions Trophy
| Gold medal – first place | 2000 Amstelveen | Team |
| Gold medal – first place | 2002 Cologne | Team |
| Gold medal – first place | 2003 Amstelveen | Team |
| Gold medal – first place | 2006 Terrassa | Team |
| Silver medal – second place | 2004 Lahore | Team |
| Silver medal – second place | 2005 Chennai | Team |
| Bronze medal – third place | 1999 Brisbane | Team |
| Bronze medal – third place | 2007 Kuala Lumpur | Team |

Augustinus ("Guus") Wilhelmus Johannes Marines Vogels (born 26 March 1975 in Naaldwijk, South Holland) is a Dutch field hockey goalkeeper, who twice won Olympic gold medals with the national squad: at the 1996 Summer Olympics in Atlanta and four years later, at the 2000 Summer Olympics in Sydney.

In 2004 he was the starter and won the silver medal with the Dutch team in Athens. Vogels made his debut in January 1996, at the Olympic Qualifier Tournament in Barcelona, in the match against Belgium: 8–4. He plays for HGC (H.O.C. Gazellen-Combinatie) in the Dutch League (Hoofdklasse). Vogels was named Best Goalkeeper at the 2004 Champions Trophy in Lahore, Pakistan. Also Vogels was named the best player in the Hockey World Cup 2010 held at New Delhi.
