= Santi Freixa =

Spanish field hockey player (born 1983)

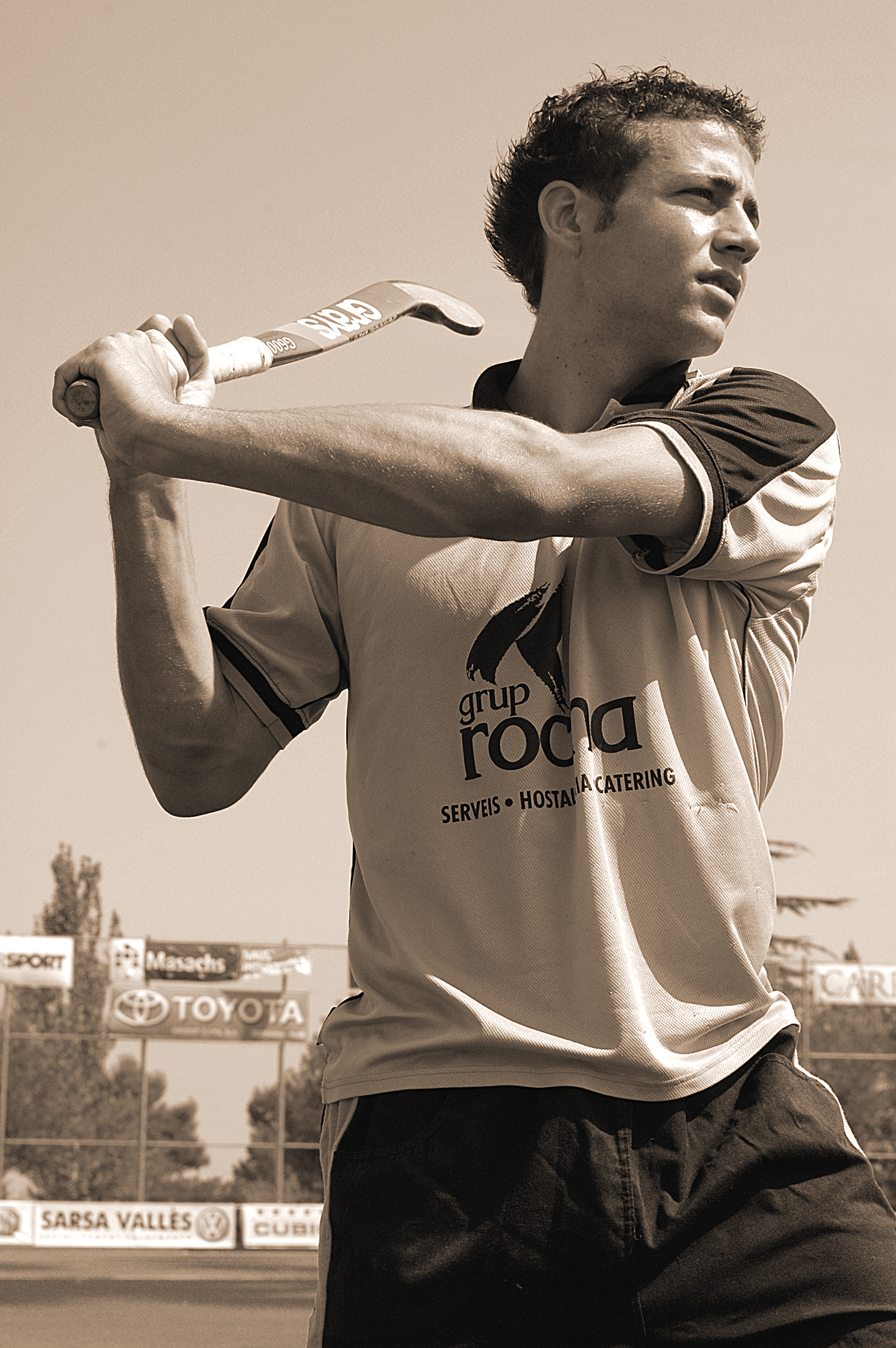
- Freixa in 2005

Personal information
- Full name: Santiago Freixa Escudé
- Born: 13 February 1983 (age 43) Terrassa, Spain

Sport
- Sport: Field hockey
- Position: Forward
- Club: Bloemendaal Men (assistant)
Youth career
- Team
- –: Atlètic Terrassa
Senior career
Years	Team	Caps	Goals
–2006	Atlètic Terrassa	-	-
2007–2011	Amsterdam	-	-
2011–2012	Atlètic Terrassa	-	-
2012–2015	Amsterdam	-	-
National team
Years	Team	Caps	Goals
2000–2014	Spain	193	(126)
Coaching career
- 2015–2017: Netherlands Women (assistant)
- 2016–2019: Kampong Women
- 2019-2021: Amsterdam Men
- 2021-Present: Bloemendaal Men (assistant)
Medal record
Men's field hockey
Representing Spain
Olympic Games
Silver medal – second place	2008 Beijing	Team
European Championship
Gold medal – first place	2005 Leipzig
Champions Trophy
Gold medal – first place	2004 Lahore
Silver medal – second place	2011 Auckland
Bronze medal – third place	2005 Chennai
Bronze medal – third place	2006 Terrassa

Santiago "Santi" Freixa i Escudé (born 13 February 1983) is a Spanish field hockey coach and former player who played for the Spain national team as a forward.

In November 2015, Freixa received the Athletes in Excellence Award from The Foundation for Global Sports Development, in recognition of his community service efforts and work with youth.

== Club career ==
Freixa played in Spain for his local club Atètic Terrassa until 2006, when he joined Dutch club Amsterdam in Amstelveen. In 2015 he announced his retirement from professional field hockey. He still played a few matches for the first team of Amsterdam the next season because of an injury crisis. He was the head coach of the first women's team of SV Kampong from 2016 until 2019. In April 2019, he agreed to be the head coach of the first men's team of his former club Amsterdam from the 2019–20 season onwards.

== International career ==
He earned his first cup in 2000 against The Netherlands. In 2004, Freixa was named Talent of the Year by the International Hockey Federation and won the Champions Trophy with Spain in Lahore. At the 2012 Summer Olympics, he competed for the national team in the men's tournament, captaining the side. He played for the Spanish national team until 2014.

Preceded by Grant Schubert	WorldHockey Young Player of the Year; 2004	Succeeded by Robert van der Horst
