= Fred Soyez =

French field hockey coach

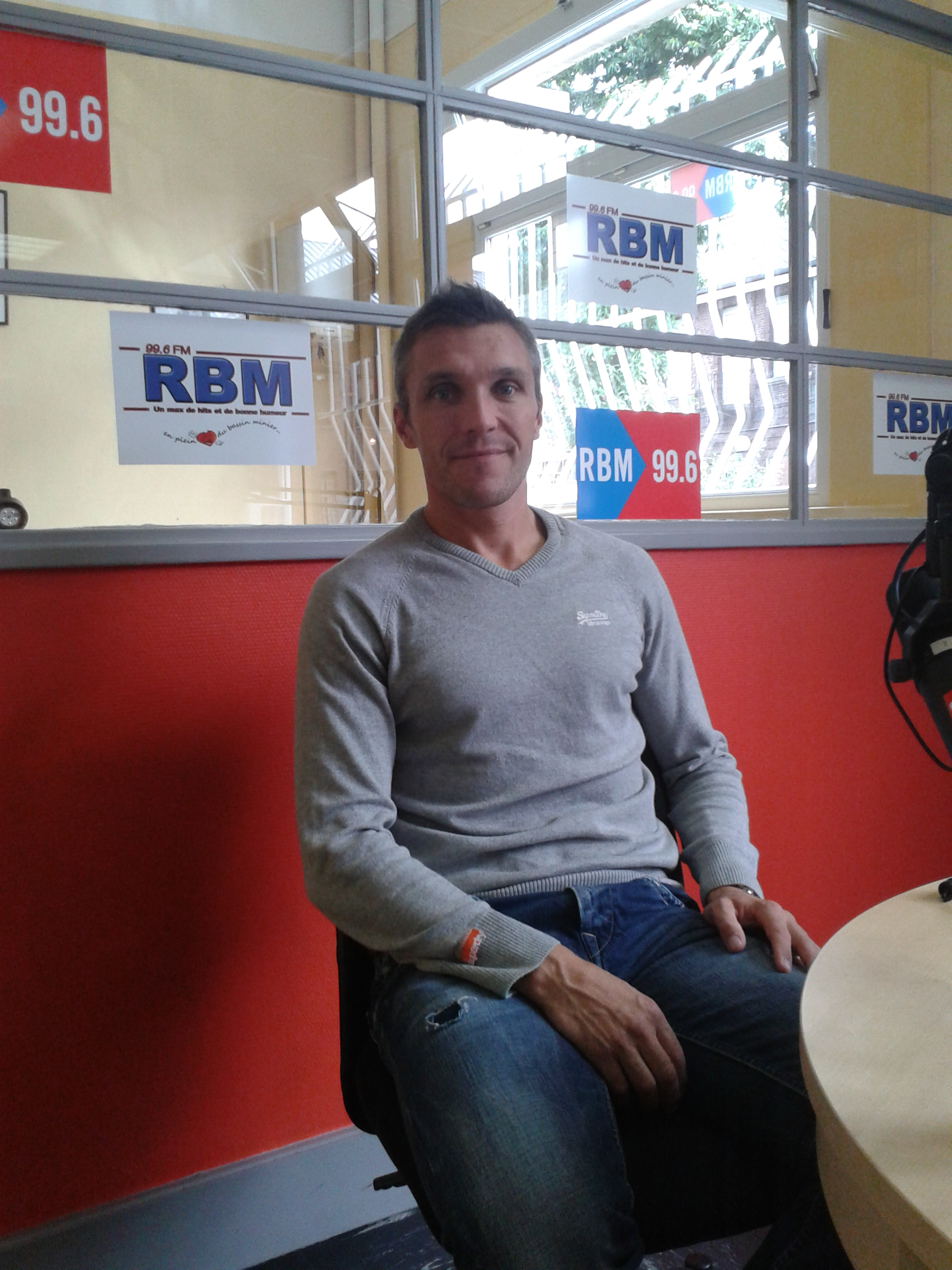

Personal information
- Nationality: French
- Born: 11 February 1978 (age 48) Valenciennes, France

Sport
- Country: France
- Sport: Field hockey
- Team: Spain (coach)

Frederic "Fred" Soyez (born 11 February 1978) is a French field hockey coach. He coached the Spanish national team at the 2016 Summer Olympics, where the team finished fifth. In 2026, he was appointed coach of the Indian national junior team.
