= Ulrich Bubolz =

German field hockey player

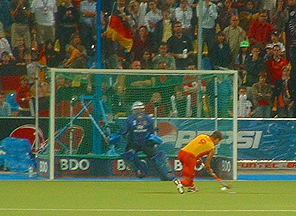

Ulrich Bubolz (born 25 February 1981) is a field hockey goalkeeper from Germany who, as of 2010, plays for Berliner Hockey Club.
