= 2005 Men's EuroHockey Nations Championship =

2005 EuroHockey Nations Championship
Tournament details
- Host country: Germany
- City: Leipzig
- Dates: 28 August – 4 September
- Teams: 8 (from 1 confederation)
- Venue: ATV Leipzig

Final positions
- Champions: Spain (2nd title)
- Runner-up: Netherlands
- Third place: Germany

Tournament statistics
- Matches played: 20
- Goals scored: 99 (4.95 per match)
- Top scorer: (Netherlands) Taeke Taekema (7 goals)

The 2005 Men's EuroHockey Nations Championship was the tenth edition of the Men's EuroHockey Nations Championship, the biennial international men's field hockey championship of Europe organized by the European Hockey Federation. It was held on the complex of the hockey club ATV Leipzig in Leipzig, Germany from 28 August to 4 September 2005.

For the first time, there were just eight teams competing instead of twelve. From 2005 on the competition has been held every two years, while the lower-ranked teams got their own championship, divided into a Nations Trophy ("B"-nations) and a Nations Challenge ("C"-nations).

Spain won their second title by defeating the Netherlands 4–2 in the final. The hosts and four-time defending champions Germany won the bronze medal by defeating Belgium 9–1.

== Results ==
All times are Central European Summer Time (UTC +2)

=== Pool A ===
Pos	Team	Pld	W	D	L	GF	GA	GD	Pts	Qualification
1	Germany (H)	3	3	0	0	10	2	+8	9	Semi-finals
2	Belgium	3	1	1	1	4	6	−2	4	Semi-finals
3	Scotland	3	1	0	2	6	9	−3	3	5–8th place semi-finals
4	England	3	0	1	2	3	6	−3	1	5–8th place semi-finals

(H) Hosts

28 August 2005
15:30

Germany	5–1	Scotland
Zeller 4'; Emmerling 7'; Keller 32', 70'; Weißenborn 33'	Report	M. Ralph 20'

Umpires:
Pawel Linkowski (POL)
Rob ten Cate (NED)

28 August 2005
18:00

England	1–1	Belgium
Hawes 9'	Report	Vandeweghe 18'

Umpires:
Henrik Ehlers (DEN)
Francisco Vasquez (ESP)

30 August 2005
17:30

Germany	4–1	Belgium
Witthaus 8', 57'; Meinert 42'; Zeller 70'	Report	Brulé 21'

Umpires:
Francisco Vasquez (ESP)
Paul Ludwig (AUS)

30 August 2005
20:15

England	2–4	Scotland
Daly 5'; Garrard 70'	Report	Christie 18', 59'; D. Ralph 46'; Simpson 49'

Umpires:
Rob ten Cate (NED)
Hichem Azaiez (FRA)

1 September 2005
10:45

Belgium	2–1	Scotland
De Cock 21'; Brulé 50'	Report	Stott 52'

Umpires:
Pawel Linkowski (POL)
Rob ten Cate (NED)

1 September 2005
17:23

Germany	1–0	England
Witthaus 69'	Report

Umpires:
Paul Ludwig (AUS)
Hichem Azaiez (FRA)

=== Pool B ===
Pos	Team	Pld	W	D	L	GF	GA	GD	Pts	Qualification
1	Netherlands	3	3	0	0	9	6	+3	9	Semi-finals
2	Spain	3	2	0	1	9	6	+3	6	Semi-finals
3	Poland	3	1	0	2	6	5	+1	3	5–8th place semi-finals
4	France	3	0	0	3	8	15	−7	0	5–8th place semi-finals

28 August 2005
10:30

Netherlands	5–4	France
Reckers 5'; Taekema 14', 21'; Klaver 41'	Report	Verrier 25'; Durchon 34', 63'; Soyez 61'

Umpires:
David Wallis (SCO)
Paul Ludwig (AUS)

28 August 2005
13:00

Spain	2–1	Poland
Tubau 26', 70'	Report	Choczaj 61'

Umpires:
Markus Petter (GER)
Sebastian Duterme (BEL)

29 August 2005
17:30

Netherlands	2–1	Poland
Taekema 17', 53'	Report	Mikula 70'

Umpires:
James Pilgrim (ENG)
Sebastien Duterme (BEL)

29 August 2005
20:15

Spain	6–3	France
Freixa 28'; Sojo 29'; Garza 39'; Amat 47'; Fàbregas 52'; Tubau 68'	Report	Boyer 12'; Soyez 42', 61'

Umpires:
David Wallis (SCO)
Henrik Ehlers (DEN)

1 September 2005
13:00

Poland	4–1	France
Grotofwski 6', 30'; Choczaj 29', 69'	Report	Gaillard 40'

Umpires:
Markus Petter (GER)
Sebastian Duterme (BEL)

1 September 2005
15:15

Netherlands	2–1	Spain
M. Brouwer 21'; R. Brouwer 60'	Report	Fàbregas 45'

Umpires:
Henrik Ehlers (DEN)
James Pilgrim (ENG)

=== Fifth to eighth place classification ===
5–8th place semi-finals
2 September
Scotland	2
France	4
2 September
Poland	0
England	3

Fifth place
3 September
France (p.s.)	2 (5)
England	2 (4)
Seventh place
3 September
Scotland	2 (3)
Poland (p.s.)	2 (4)

==== 5–8th place semi-finals ====
2 September 2005
16:30

Scotland	2–4	France
M. Ralph 5'; D. Ralph 44'	Report	Soyez 45', 59'; Jaquet 58'; Collon 65'

Umpires:
Pawel Linkowski (POL)
Markus Petter (GER)

2 September 2005
19:00

Poland	0–3	England
	Report	Moore 2', 61'; Middleton 63'

Umpires:
Rob ten Cate (NED)
Francisco Vasquez (ESP)

==== Seventh place game ====
3 September 2005
16:30

Scotland	2–2 (a.e.t.)	Poland
Dick 34'; Simpson 66'	Report	Grotowski 6'; Mikula 46'
Penalties
Dick (penalty shoot-out scored); M. Ralph (penalty shoot-out scored); Stott (penalty shoot-out scored); Sewnauth (penalty shoot-out missed); Christie (penalty shoot-out missed)	3–4	(penalty shoot-out scored) Dutkiewicz; (penalty shoot-out scored) Juszcak; (penalty shoot-out scored) Rachwalski; (penalty shoot-out scored) Maleki

Umpires:
Hichem Azaiez (FRA)
Markus Petter (GER)

==== Fifth place game ====
3 September 2005
19:00

France	2–2 (a.e.t.)	England
Soyez 35'; Moreau 40'	Report	Moore 66'; Hawes 70'
Penalties
Verrier (penalty shoot-out scored); Goudie (penalty shoot-out scored); Soyez (penalty shoot-out scored); Monnier (penalty shoot-out scored); Boyer (penalty shoot-out scored)	5–4	(penalty shoot-out scored) Clarke; (penalty shoot-out scored) West; (penalty shoot-out scored) Jaquet; (penalty shoot-out scored) Kirkham; (penalty shoot-out missed) Tindall

Umpires:
Pawel Linkowski (POL)
Francisco Vasquez (ESP)

=== First to fourth place classification ===
Semi-finals
3 September
Netherlands	5
Belgium	1
3 September
Germany	2
Spain	3

Final
4 September
Netherlands	2
Spain	4
Third place
4 September
Belgium	1
Germany	9

==== Semi-finals ====
3 September 2005

Netherlands	5–1	Belgium
Weusthof 33'; Taekema 40', 42'; Reckers 45'; M. Brouwer 55'	Report	Vandeweghe 60'

Umpires:
James Pilgrim (ENG)
Henrik Ehlers (DEN)

3 September 2005
14:00

Germany	2–3	Spain
Zeller 29'; Witthaus 38'	Report	Freixa 12', 28'; Amat 70'

Umpires:
Paul Ludwig (AUS)
David Wallis (SCO)

==== Third place game ====
4 September 2005
10:00

Belgium	1–9	Germany
Vandeweghe 32'	Report	Meinert 10'; Keller 11', 22', 53'; Nevado 20'; Zeller 38', 42'; Markowsky 60'; Biederlack 65'

Umpires:
Rob ten Cate (NED)
Francisco Vasquez (ESP)

==== Final ====
4 September 2005
12:20

Netherlands	2–4	Spain
Klaver 47'; Taekema 58'	Report	Freixa 38', 67'; Amat 69', 70'

Umpires:
Henrik Ehlers (DEN)
James Pilgrim (ENG)

== Final standings ==
Pos	Team	Qualification or relegation
1	Spain	Qualification for the 2006 World Cup
2	Netherlands	Qualification for the 2006 World Cup
3	Germany (H)	
4	Belgium	
5	France	
6	England	
7	Poland	Relegation to the Nations Trophy
8	Scotland	Relegation to the Nations Trophy

(H) Host

== See also ==
- 2005 Men's EuroHockey Nations Trophy
- 2005 Women's EuroHockey Nations Championship
