= 2007 Men's EuroHockey Nations Championship =

International field hockey competition

EURO 2007
- Official logo

Tournament details
- Host country: England
- City: Manchester
- Dates: 19–26 August
- Teams: 8 (from 1 confederation)
- Venue: Belle Vue Regional Hockey Centre

Final positions
- Champions: Netherlands (3rd title)
- Runner-up: Spain
- Third place: Belgium

Tournament statistics
- Matches played: 20
- Goals scored: 105 (5.25 per match)
- Top scorer: (Netherlands) Taeke Taekema (16 goals)
- Best player: (Netherlands) Robert van der Horst

The 2007 Men's EuroHockey Nations Championship was the 11th edition of the Men's EuroHockey Nations Championship, the biennial international men's field hockey championship of Europe organized by the European Hockey Federation. It was held in Manchester, England from 19 to 26 August 2007.

The Netherlands won its third title by defeating the defending champions Spain 3–2 in the final. Belgium won its first-ever medal by defeating Germany 4–3.

The top three teams qualified directly for the 2008 Summer Olympics. The other teams qualified for the qualification tournaments for the Summer Olympics.

== Qualified teams ==
Dates	Event	Location	Quotas	Qualifier(s)
Host			1	England
28 August – 4 September 2005	2005 EuroHockey Championship	Leipzig, Germany	5	Belgium; France; Germany; Netherlands; Spain
11–17 September 2005	2005 EuroHockey Nations Trophy	Rome, Italy	2	Czech Republic; Ireland
Total			8	

== Results ==
=== Pool A ===
Pos	Team	Pld	W	D	L	GF	GA	GD	Pts	Qualification
1	Germany	3	2	1	0	10	2	+8	7	Semi-finals
2	Belgium	3	1	2	0	10	4	+6	5	Semi-finals
3	England (H)	3	1	1	1	9	5	+4	4	Pool C
4	Czech Republic	3	0	0	3	0	18	−18	0	Pool C

(H) Hosts

19 August 2007
10:00

Germany	5–0	Czech Republic
Weß 9', 48'; Zeller 22'; Nevado 37', 55'	Report

Umpires:
Rob ten Cate (NED)
Colin Hutchinson (IRL)

19 August 2007
12:00

England	2–2	Belgium
Daly 26'; Middleton 67'	Report	Dohmen 31'; Vandeweghe 46'

Umpires:
Henrik Ehlers (DEN)
Juan Manuel Requena (ESP)

20 August 2007
17:00

Germany	2–2	Belgium
Witthaus 10'; Zeller 18'	Report	Vandeweghe 33'; Dohmen 66'

Umpires:
Henrik Ehlers (DEN)
Marcin Grochal (POL)

20 August 2007
19:00

England	7–0	Czech Republic
Middleton 7', 51'; R. Mantell 18', 21', 44'; Daly 45'; Jones 52'	Report

Umpires:
Juan Manuel Requena (ESP)
Marc Knülle (FRA)

22 August 2007
15:00

Czech Republic	0–6	Belgium
	Report	Dohmen 1', 62'; Gucassoff 8', 66'; Luycx 32'; Vandeweghe 55'

Umpires:
Marc Knulle (FRA)
Ged Curran (SCO)

22 August 2007
19:00

England	0–3	Germany
	Report	Witthaus 3', 31'; Montag 45'

Umpires:
Rob ten Cate (NED)
Henrik Ehlers (DEN)

=== Pool B ===
Pos	Team	Pld	W	D	L	GF	GA	GD	Pts	Qualification
1	Netherlands	3	3	0	0	13	5	+8	9	Semi-finals
2	Spain	3	1	1	1	9	5	+4	4	Semi-finals
3	France	3	1	0	2	4	14	−10	3	Pool C
4	Ireland	3	0	1	2	1	3	−2	1	Pool C

19 August 2007
14:00

Spain	1–1	Ireland
Ribas 43'	Report	Gleghorne 2'

Umpires:
Christian Blasch (GER)
Ged Curran (SCO)

19 August 2007
16:00

Netherlands	8–3	France
Taekema 9', 10', 26', 43', 59'; Brouwer 20', 58'; Bouwens 65'	Report	Jean-Jean 32'; Genestet 47'; Verrier 63'

Umpires:
John Wright (RSA)
Hamish Jamson (ENG)

21 August 2007
09:00

Spain	6–0	France
Ribas 20', 67', 70'; Sojo 24'; Tubau 30'; Amat 32'	Report

Umpires:
Rob ten Cate (NED)
Marcin Grochal (POL)

21 August 2007
11:00

Netherlands	1–0	Ireland
Taekema 16'	Report

Umpires:
Hamish Jamson (ENG)
Ged Curran (SCO)

22 August 2007
13:00

France	1–0	Ireland
Soyez 10'	Report

Umpires:
Hamish Jamson (ENG)
Rob ten Cate (NED)

22 August 2007
17:00

Spain	2–4	Netherlands
Ribas 6'; Amat 42'	Report	De Nooijer 2'; Taekema 24', 47'; Weusthof 35'

Umpires:
Henrik Ehlers (DEN)
Christian Blasch (GER)

=== Fifth to eighth place classification ===
The points obtained in the preliminary round against the other team are taken over.

==== Pool C ====
Pos	Team	Pld	W	D	L	GF	GA	GD	Pts	Relegation
5	England (H)	3	2	1	0	15	1	+14	7	
6	France	3	2	0	1	4	7	−3	6	
7	Ireland	3	1	1	1	11	2	+9	4	EuroHockey Nations Trophy
8	Czech Republic	3	0	0	3	0	20	−20	0	EuroHockey Nations Trophy

(H) Hosts

24 August 2007
12:00

England	1–1	Ireland
Tindall 15'	Report	Jermyn 12'

Umpires:
Juan Manuel Raquena (ESP)
Marc Knülle (FRA)

24 August 2007
14:00

France	3–0	Czech Republic
Durchon 15'; Gouedard Comte 49'; Genestet 55'	Report

Umpires:
Marcin Grochal (POL)
Colin Hutchinson (IRL)

26 August 2007
09:00

Czech Republic	0–10	Ireland
	Report	Gleghorne 3', 68'; Jermyn 11', 19', 41'; Magee 24'; Maguire 35'; Barbour 60', 70'; Shaw 63'

Umpires:
Marc Knūlle (FRA)
Hamish Jamson (ENG)

26 August 2007
11:00

England	7–0	France
Jackson 14', 28', 65'; S. Mantell 23'; R. Mantell 38'; Clarke 57'; Wilson 59'	Report

Umpires:
Ged Curran (SCO)
Juan Manuel Raquena (ESP)

=== First to fourth place classification ===
Semi-finals
24 August
Netherlands	7
Belgium	2
24 August
Germany	3 (2)
Spain (p.s.)	3 (4)

Final
26 August
Netherlands	3
Spain	2
Third place
26 August
Belgium	4
Germany	3

==== Semi-finals ====
24 August 2007
16:00

Netherlands	7–2	Belgium
Taekema 14', 19', 47', 50', 51', 63'; Weusthof 29'	Report	Vandeweghe 12'; Van den Balck 39'

Umpires:
John Wright (RSA)
Christian Blasch (GER)

24 August 2007
18:30

Germany	3–3 (a.e.t.)	Spain
Zeller 7', 65'; Nevado 19'	Report	Ribas 2', 58'; Alegre 60'
Penalties
C. Zeller (penalty shoot-out scored); Weß (penalty shoot-out missed); Meinert (penalty shoot-out scored); P. Zeller (penalty shoot-out missed)	2–4	(penalty shoot-out scored) Alegre; (penalty shoot-out scored) Enrique; (penalty shoot-out scored) Amat; (penalty shoot-out scored) Tubau

Umpires:
Rob ten Cate (NED)
Henrik Ehlers (DEN)

=== Third and fourth place ===
26 August 2007
13:00

Belgium	4–3	Germany
De Saedeleer 42'; Vandeweghe 43'; Dekeyser 62'; Briels 70'	Report	Witte 33'; Witthaus 40'; Meinert 65'

Umpires:
Henrik Ehlers (DEN)
John Wright (RSA)

=== Final ===
26 August 2007
15:30

Netherlands	3–2	Spain
Brouwer 5'; Taekema 35', 57'	Report	Lainz 52'; Tubau 64'

Umpires:
Colin Hutchinson (IRL)
Christian Blasch (GER)

== Statistics ==
=== Final standings ===
Pos	Team	Qualification or relegation
1st place, gold medalist(s)	Netherlands	Qualification for the 2008 Summer Olympics
2nd place, silver medalist(s)	Spain	Qualification for the 2008 Summer Olympics
3rd place, bronze medalist(s)	Belgium	Qualification for the 2008 Summer Olympics
4	Germany	
5	England (H)	
6	France	
7	Ireland	Relegation to the Nations Trophy
8	Czech Republic	Relegation to the Nations Trophy

(H) Host.

=== Awards ===
Topscorer	Player of the tournament	Goalkeeper of the tournament	Fair Play Award
(Netherlands) Taeke Taekema	(Netherlands) Robert van der Horst	(Netherlands) Guus Vogels	Ireland

== See also ==
- 2007 Men's EuroHockey Nations Trophy
- 2007 Women's EuroHockey Nations Championship
