= 2008 Men's Hockey Champions Trophy =

Field hockey tournament

Tournament details
- Host country: Netherlands
- City: Rotterdam
- Teams: 6

Final positions
- Champions: Australia (9th title)
- Runner-up: Spain
- Third place: Argentina

Tournament statistics
- Matches played: 18
- Goals scored: 87 (4.83 per match)
- Top scorer: (Germany) Florian Keller (7 goals)
- Best player: (Australia) Jamie Dwyer

The 2008 Men's Hockey Champions Trophy was the 30th edition of the Hockey Champions Trophy men's field hockey tournament. It was held in from June 21 to June 29, 2008 in Rotterdam, Netherlands.

== Participating nations ==
Six national teams participated in the tournament with Germany defending the title they won in the 2007 Champions Trophy in Kuala Lumpur.

- Australia
- South Korea
- Netherlands
- Spain
- Germany (defending champions)
- Argentina

== Squads ==
Argentina

Head coach: Carlos Retegui

1. Juan Manuel Vivaldi (GK)
2. Juan Ignacio Gilardi
3. Juan Martín López
4. Matías Vila (C)
7. Mario Almada
8. Lucas Rey
9. Rodrigo Vila
10. Matías Paredes
11. Lucas Cammareri
12. Lucas Vila
13. Juan Eduardo Garreta
20. Tomás Argento
22. Matías Rey
24. Lucas Argento
26. Joaquin Gonzalez (GK)
28. Facundo Callioni
29. Agustin Corradini
31. Ignacio Bergner
Australia

Head coach: Barry Dancer

1. Jamie Dwyer
2. Liam de Young
6. Robert Hammond
9. Mark Knowles
11. Eddie Ockenden
12. David Guest
13. Luke Doerner
14. Grant Schubert
15. Bevan George (C)
17. Andrew Smith
18. Stephen Lambert (GK)
19. Eli Matheson
22. Nathan Burgers (GK)
23. Matthew Wells
24. Travis Brooks
28. Kiel Brown
31. Fergus Kavanagh
32. Des Abbott
Germany

Head coach: Markus Weise

1. Ulrich Bubolz (GK)
3. Philip Witte
5. Sebastian Biederlack
7. Carlos Nevado
8. Christoph Menke
9. Moritz Fürste
10. Jan-Marco Montag
11. Sebastian Draguhn
13. Tobias Hauke
14. Tibor Weißenborn
15. Benjamin Weß
16. Niklas Meinert
17. Timo Weß (C)
18. Oliver Korn
21. Max Weinhold (GK)
22. Matthias Witthaus
23. Florian Keller
25. Philipp Zeller
South Korea

Head coach: Cho Myung-jun

1. Ko Dong-sik (GK)
2. Kim Byung-hoon
3. Kim Chul
5. Kim Yong-bae
6. Lee Nam-yong
7. Seo Jong-ho (C)
8. Kang Seong-jung
9. Yoon Sung-hoon
10. You Hyo-sik
11. Yeo Woon-kon
13. Hong Sung-kweon
14. Hyun Hye-sung
15. Cha Jong-bok
16. Lee Myung-ho (GK)
17. Hong Eun-seong
19. Kang Moon-kweon
22. Kim Sam-seok
25. Jang Jong-hyun
Netherlands

Head coach: Roelant Oltmans

1. Guus Vogels (GK)
2. Wouter Jolie
3. Geert-Jan Derikx
5. Rob Derikx
6. Thomas Boerma
8. Ronald Brouwer
9. Roderick Weusthof
11. Laurence Docherty
12. Jeroen Delmee (C)
14. Teun de Nooijer
15. Eby Kessing
16. Floris Evers
18. Rob Reckers
19. Matthijs Brouwer
20. Jeroen Hertzberger
23. Timme Hoyng
24. Robert van der Horst
26. Jaap Stockmann (GK)
Spain

Head coach: Maurits Hendriks

1. Francisco Cortés (GK)
2. Santi Freixa
5. Francisco Fabregas (C)
6. Franc Dinares
8. Alex Fàbregas
9. Pol Amat
10. Eduard Tubau
12. Juan Fernández
13. Ramón Alegre
16. Xavier Ribas
17. Albert Sala
18. Rodrigo Garza
20. Sergi Enrique
21. Eduard Arbós
22. Xavier Castillano (GK)
23. David Alegre
24. Roc Oliva
25. Jose Borrell

== Results ==
All times are Central European Summer Time (UTC+02:00)

=== Standings ===
Pos	Team	Pld	W	D	L	GF	GA	GD	Pts	Qualification
1	Spain	5	3	1	1	14	7	+7	10	Final
2	Australia	5	3	1	1	13	9	+4	10	Final
3	Argentina	5	3	1	1	10	7	+3	10	Third Place Match
4	Netherlands (H)	5	2	0	3	13	12	+1	6	Third Place Match
5	Germany	5	1	1	3	10	16	−6	4	Fifth Place Match
6	South Korea	5	1	0	4	14	23	−9	3	Fifth Place Match

Source: FIH
Rules for classification: 1) points; 2) goal difference; 3) goals scored; 4) head-to-head result.
(H) Hosts

==== Fixtures ====
21 June 2008
10:30

Australia	5–3	South Korea
Matheson 4'; Guest 24'; Dwyer 38'; Smith 40'; De Young 49'	Report	Yeo 28'; Jang 47'; Lee N. 58'

Umpires:
John Wright (RSA)
Andy Mair (SCO)

21 June 2008
13:00

Germany	2–2	Argentina
Keller 6'; Weß 69'	Report	Paredes 25'; R. Vila 55'

Umpires:
Juan Manuel Requena (ESP)
Satinder Kumar (IND)

21 June 2008
15:30

Netherlands	3–1	Spain
De Nooijer 10'; R. Brouwer 19'; Docherty 53'	Report	Ribas 61'

Umpires:
David Gentles (AUS)
Christian Blasch (GER)

22 June 2008
11:00

Argentina	2–1	Australia
L. Vila 7'; T. Argento 15'	Report	Kavanagh 22'

Umpires:
Christian Blasch (GER)
Rob ten Cate (NED)

22 June 2008
13:30

Spain	7–2	South Korea
Ribas 7'; Amat 23', 27', 39', 40'; R. Alegre 56'; Freixa 60'	Report	Kim B. 48'; Jang 70'

Umpires:
Andy Mair (SCO)
Roel van Eert (NED)

22 June 2008
16:00

Netherlands	5–3	Germany
Weusthof 34', 41'; Reckers 39'; R. Brouwer 45'; Hertzberger 52'	Report	Keller 3', 24'; Montag 70'

Umpires:
Juan Manuel Requena (ESP)
David Gentles (AUS)

24 June 2008
13:00

Germany	4–3	South Korea
Keller 3', 21'; Korn 7'; Draguhn 13'	Report	Kim B. 16'; Lee N. 50'; Seo 64'

Umpires:
Rob ten Cate (NED)
David Gentles (AUS)

24 June 2008
15:00

Australia	1–1	Spain
Schubert 54'	Report	D. Alegre 64'

Umpires:
Roel van Eert (NED)
Christian Blasch (GER)

24 June 2008
19:30

Argentina	1–0	Netherlands
Gilardi 70'	Report

Umpires:
John Wright (RSA)
Satinder Kumar (IND)^{+}
^{+} Replaced at half time by Juan Manuel Requena (ESP) due to injury

25 June 2008
19:30

Spain	2–1	Argentina
Freixa 21', 43'	Report	Callioni 10'

Umpires:
David Gentles (AUS)
Andy Mair (SCO)

26 June 2008
17:00

Australia	3–1	Germany
Dwyer 17'; Kavanagh 44'; Ockenden 50'	Report	Keller 26'

Umpires:
John Wright (RSA)
Rob ten Cate (NED)

26 June 2008
19:30

South Korea	4–3	Netherlands
Jang 27', 68'; Seo 32'; Yeo 64'	Report	De Nooijer 5'; Weusthof 41'; R. Brouwer 63'

Umpires:
Christian Blasch (GER)
Juan Manuel Requena (ESP)

27 June 2008
17:30

South Korea	2–4	Argentina
Jang 38', 67'	Report	Paredes 26'; R. Vila 47', 60'; Gilardi 57'

Umpires:
John Wright (RSA)
Roel van Eert (NED)

28 June 2008
13:00

Germany	0–3	Spain
	Report	Amat 1'; D. Alegre 39'; Freixa 42'

Umpires:
David Gentles (AUS)
Roel van Eert (NED)

28 June 2008
15:00

Netherlands	2–3	Australia
Derikx 5'; Hertzberger 54'	Report	Schubert 35'; Dwyer 48'; Brooks 62'

Umpires:
John Wright (RSA)
Christian Blasch (GER)

=== Classification ===
==== Fifth and sixth place ====
29 June 2008
11:00

Germany	3–1	South Korea
Draguhn 12'; Weißenborn 62'; Keller 69'	Report	Yeo 33'

Umpires:
Satinder Kumar (IND)
Rob ten Cate (NED)

==== Third and fourth place ====
29 June 2008
13:30

Argentina	2–2 (a.e.t.)	Netherlands
Almada 17'; Paredes 62'	Report	De Nooijer 5'; R. Brouwer 31'
Penalties
L. Vila (penalty shoot-out scored); Gilardi (penalty shoot-out scored); R. Vila (penalty shoot-out scored); M. Vila (penalty shoot-out scored); Cammareri (penalty shoot-out scored)	5–3	(penalty shoot-out scored) R. Brouwer; (penalty shoot-out scored) Reckers; (penalty shoot-out scored) Weusthof; (penalty shoot-out missed) Van der Horst

Umpires:
Andy Mair (SCO)
Juan Manuel Requena (ESP)

==== Final ====
29 June 2008
16:00

Spain	1–4	Australia
Ribas 12'	Report	Abbott 6'; Dwyer 52'; Ockenden 60'; Matheson 70'

Umpires:
John Wright (RSA)
Christian Blasch (GER)

== Awards ==
Top Goalscorer	Player of the Tournament	Goalkeeper of the Tournament	Best Young Player	Fair Play Award
(Germany) Florian Keller	(Australia) Jamie Dwyer	(Argentina) Juan Manuel Vivaldi	(Australia) Edward Ockenden	Spain

== Final standings ==
As per statistical convention in field hockey, matches decided in regular time are counted as wins and losses, while matches decided by penalty shoot-outs are counted as draws.

Pos	Team	Pld	W	D	L	GF	GA	GD	Pts	Final result
1st place, gold medalist(s)	Australia	6	4	1	1	17	10	+7	13	Gold Medal
2nd place, silver medalist(s)	Spain	6	3	1	2	15	11	+4	10	Silver Medal
3rd place, bronze medalist(s)	Argentina	6	3	2	1	12	9	+3	11	Bronze Medal
4	Netherlands (H)	6	2	1	3	15	14	+1	7	
5	Germany	6	2	1	3	13	17	−4	7	
6	South Korea	6	1	0	5	15	26	−11	3	

Source: FIH
(H) Hosts

== Goalscorers ==
There were 87 goals scored in 18 matches, for an average of 4.83 goals per match.

7 goals

- (Germany) Florian Keller

6 goals

- (South Korea) Jang Jong-hyun

5 goals

- (Spain) Pol Amat

4 goals

- (Australia) Jamie Dwyer
- (Netherlands) Ronald Brouwer
- (Spain) Santiago Freixa

3 goals

- (Argentina) Matías Paredes
- (Argentina) Rodrigo Vila
- (Netherlands) Teun de Nooijer
- (Netherlands) Roderick Weusthof
- (South Korea) Yeo Woon-kon
- (Spain) Xavier Ribas

2 goals

- (Argentina) Juan Ignacio Gilardi
- (Australia) Eli Matheson
- (Australia) Fergus Kavanagh
- (Australia) Edward Ockenden
- (Australia) Grant Schubert
- (Germany) Sebastian Draguhn
- (Netherlands) Jeroen Hertzberger
- (South Korea) Kim Byung-hoon
- (South Korea) Seo Jong-ho
- (South Korea) Lee Nam-yong
- (Spain) David Alegre

1 goal

- (Argentina) Mario Almada
- (Argentina) Tomás Argento
- (Argentina) Facundo Callioni
- (Argentina) Lucas Vila
- (Australia) Desmond Abbott
- (Australia) Travis Brooks
- (Australia) David Guest
- (Australia) Andrew Smith
- (Australia) Liam de Young
- (Germany) Oliver Korn
- (Germany) Jan-Marco Montag
- (Germany) Tibor Weißenborn
- (Germany) Timo Weß
- (Netherlands) Geert-Jan Derikx
- (Netherlands) Laurence Docherty
- (Netherlands) Rob Reckers
- (Spain) Ramón Alegre

Source: FIH
