= 2007 Men's Hockey Champions Trophy =

Field hockey tournament

Tournament details
- Host country: Malaysia
- City: Kuala Lumpur
- Dates: 29 November – 9 December
- Teams: 8
- Venue(s): Malaysia National Hockey Stadium, Bukit Jalil

Final positions
- Champions: Germany (9th title)
- Runner-up: Australia
- Third place: Netherlands

Tournament statistics
- Matches played: 32
- Goals scored: 146 (4.56 per match)
- Top scorer(s): (South Korea) Jang Jong-hyun (Netherlands) Taeke Taekema (7 goals)
- Best player: (Netherlands) Guus Vogels

The 2007 Men's Hockey Champions Trophy was the 29th men's field hockey tournament for the Hockey Champions Trophy. It was held from November 29 to December 9, 2007, in Kuala Lumpur, Malaysia, having moved away from Lahore, Pakistan.

== Teams ==
The teams are determined after the 2006 World Cup in Germany, based on the criteria set:

- Australia (Hockey competition champion in 2004 Summer Olympics)
- Germany (2006 Hockey World Cup Champion)
- South Korea (Fourth in 2006 Hockey World Cup)
- Netherlands (defending champion)
- Pakistan (Former host)
- Spain (Third in 2006 Hockey World Cup)
- Malaysia (host)
- Great Britain (Invitee)

== Squads ==
Australia

Head Coach: Barry Dancer

1. Jamie Dwyer
2. Liam de Young
6. Robert Hammond
7. Nathan Eglington
9. Mark Knowles
10. Russell Ford
11. Eddie Ockenden
12. David Guest
13. Luke Doerner
14. Grant Schubert
15. Bevan George
17. Andrew Smith
18. Stephen Lambert (GK)
20. Matthew Naylor
21. Aaron Hopkins
23. Matthew Wells
24. Travis Brooks
25. Brent Livermore (c)
26. Dean Butler
27. Daniel McPherson (GK)
Germany

Head Coach: Markus Weise

2. Christian Schulte (GK)
3. Philip Witte
4. Maximilian Müller
5. Sebastian Biederlack
7. Carlos Nevado
8. Christoph Menke
9. Moritz Fürste
10. Jan-Marco Montag
11. Sebastian Draguhn
13. Tobias Hauke
14. Tibor Weißenborn
15. Benjamin Weß
16. Niklas Meinert
17. Timo Weß (c)
18. Oliver Korn
21. Max Weinhold (GK)
22. Matthias Witthaus
23. Florian Keller
26. Oliver Hentschel
30. Niklas Emmerling
Great Britain

Head Coach: Jason Lee

1. Alistair McGregor (GK)
4. Glenn Kirkham
5. Richard Alexander
6. Richard Mantell
7. Ashley Jackson
8. Simon Mantell
9. Stephen Dick
10. Matthew Daly
11. Brett Garrard (c)
12. Jonty Clarke
13. Rob Moore
14. Ben Hawes
16. Niall Stott
17. Alistair Wilson
18. Barry Middleton
20. James Tindall
21. Jon Bleby
23. Mark Ralph
24. Ben Marsden
25. James Fair (GK)
South Korea

Head Coach: Cho Myung-jun

1. Ko Dong-sik (GK)
2. Kim Sam-seok
3. Kim Chul
4. Kim Joung-goo
5. Oh Dae-keun
6. Lee Nam-yong
7. Seo Jong-ho (c)
8. Kang Seong-jung
10. Kim Byung-hoon
11. You Hyo-sik
12. Hong Sung-kweon
15. Cha Jong-bok
16. Lee Myung-ho (GK)
17. Hong Eun-seong
18. Jin Kyung-min
19. Kang Moon-kweon
20. Yeo Woon-kon
21. Lee Seung-il
24. Lee Jae-won
25. Jang Jong-hyun
Malaysia

Head Coach: Sarjit Singh

1. Khairulnizam Ibrahim (GK)
2. Baljit Sarjab
3. Chua Boon Huat
4. Baljit Singh Charun
5. Azrafiq Megat
7. Selvaraju Sandrakasi
8. Jiwa Mohan
9. Mohd Nor Madzli
10. Malek Engku
11. Shahrun Abdullah
12. Sukri Mutablib
13. Nabil Noor
14. Azlan Misron (c)
15. Jivan Mohan
16. Kumar Subramaniam (GK)
17. Razie Rahim
19. Kevinder Makbul
20. Hafifi Hanafi
22. Ismail Abu
23. Tengku Ahmad
Netherlands

Head Coach: Roelant Oltmans

1. Guus Vogels (GK)
2. Wouter Jolie
3. Geert-Jan Derikx
5. Rob Derikx
6. Thomas Boerma
8. Ronald Brouwer
10. Taeke Taekema
12. Jeroen Delmee (c)
14. Teun de Nooijer
16. Floris Evers
18. Rob Reckers
19. Matthijs Brouwer
20. Jeroen Hertzberger
21. Quirijn Caspers
22. Wouter Hermkens
23. Timme Hoyng
24. Robert van der Horst
25. Klaas Vermeulen
26. Jaap Stockmann (GK)
27. Rogier Hofman
Pakistan

Head Coach: Manzoor Manzoor-Ul-Hassan

1. Salman Akbar (c, GK)
2. Zeeshan Ashraf
3. Muhammad Imran
4. Imran Khan
5. Adnan Maqsood
6. Dilawar Hussain
7. Muhammad Waqas
8. Waqas Akbar
9. Shakeel Abbasi
10. Muhammad Arshad
11. Abbas Haider Billgrami
12. Nasir Ahmed (GK)
13. Muhammad Ali
14. Ghazanfar Ali
15. Inayat Ullah
16. Akhtar Ali
17. Muhammad Shabbir
18. Sajjad Anwar
19. Muhammad Kamran
20. Muhammad Afzal
Spain

Head Coach: Maurits Hendriks

2. Santi Freixa
3. Jordi Clapes
5. Francisco Fábregas (c)
6. Franc Dinares
8. Alex Fàbregas
9. Pol Amat
10. Eduard Tubau
12. Juan Fernández
13. Ramón Alegre
15. Víctor Sojo
16. Xavier Ribas
17. Albert Sala
18. Rodrigo Garza
20. Sergi Enrique
21. Eduard Arbós
22. Quico Cortes (GK)
23. David Alegre
24. Roc Oliva
25. Marc Salles
28. Xavier Castillano (GK)

== Results ==
All times are Malaysian Standard Time (UTC+08:00)

=== Standings ===
Pos	Team	Pld	W	D	L	GF	GA	GD	Pts	Qualification
1	Germany	7	5	1	1	21	14	+7	16	Final
2	Australia	7	4	1	2	15	8	+7	13	Final
3	Netherlands	7	3	3	1	22	17	+5	12	Third Place Match
4	South Korea	7	3	3	1	18	13	+5	12	Third Place Match
5	Spain	7	3	2	2	21	15	+6	11	Fifth Place Match
6	Great Britain	7	2	1	4	9	19	−10	7	Fifth Place Match
7	Pakistan	7	1	2	4	12	20	−8	5	Seventh Place Match
8	Malaysia (H)	7	0	1	6	11	23	−12	1	Seventh Place Match

Source: FIH
Rules for classification: 1) points; 2) goal difference; 3) goals scored; 4) head-to-head result.
(H) Hosts

==== Fixtures ====
29 November 2007
16:05

Great Britain	0–4	Netherlands
	Report	De Nooijer 2'; R. Brouwer 40'; Reckers 50', 64'

Umpires:
Kim Hong-lae (KOR)
David Gentles (AUS)

29 November 2007
18:05

Germany	5–2	Pakistan
Korn 9', 70'; Fürste 21'; Keller 22'; Witte 51'	Report	Waqas 27'; Shabbir 48'

Umpires:
Ged Curran (SCO)
Xavier Adell (ESP)

29 November 2007
18:35

South Korea	2–2	Spain
Jang 34'; Lee N. 48'	Report	Arbós 1'; Tubau 21'

Umpires:
David Gentles (AUS)
Amarjit Singh (MAS)

29 November 2007
20:05

Malaysia	0–2	Australia
	Report	Ford 19'; Brooks 62'

Umpires:
Syed Haider (PAK)
Roel van Eert (NED)

30 November 2007
16:05

Pakistan	2–0	Spain
Waqas 54'; A. Ali 61'	Report

Umpires:
Kim Hong-lae (KOR)
David Gentles (AUS)

30 November 2007
18:05

Netherlands	3–1	Malaysia
Taekema 26'; Reckers 32'; R. Brouwer 36'	Report	Kevinder 18'

Umpires:
Syed Haider (PAK)
Xavier Adell (ESP)

30 November 2007
18:35

Great Britain	0–4	Germany
	Report	Draguhn 32'; Witthaus 38', 70'; Nevado 58'

Umpires:
Roel van Eert (NED)
Amarjit Singh (MAS)

30 November 2007
20:05

Australia	0–1	South Korea
	Report	Jang 55'

Umpires:
Satinder Kumar (IND)
Gary Simmonds (RSA)

2 December 2007
16:05

Spain	3–3	Netherlands
Sojo 30'; Tubau 32'; D. Alegre 47'	Report	De Nooijer 6'; Reckers 42'; R. Brouwer 54'

Umpires:
Satinder Kumar (IND)
Ged Curran (SCO)

2 December 2007
18:05

Malaysia	2–3	Great Britain
Tengku 12'; Shahrun 62'	Report	Dick 49'; Moore 52'; Hawes 66'

Umpires:
Xavier Adell (ESP)
Gary Simmonds (RSA)

2 December 2007
18:35

Germany	2–1	South Korea
Emmerling 41'; Draguhn 55'	Report	Yeo 5'

Umpires:
Simon Taylor (NZL)
David Gentles (AUS)

2 December 2007
20:05

Pakistan	1–2	Australia
A. Ali 57'	Report	Eglington 20'; Schubert 47'

Umpires:
Roel van Eert (NED)
Kim Hong-lae (KOR)

3 December 2007
16:05

Netherlands	2–6	South Korea
Hermkens 22'; M. Brouwer 37'	Report	Jang 33', 61', 64'; Kim S. 55'; Lee N. 67'; Kim J. 68'

Umpires:
Amarjit Singh (MAS)
Simon Taylor (NZL)

3 December 2007
18:05

Australia	1–0	Great Britain
Ockenden 25'	Report

Umpires:
Xavier Adell (ESP)
Syed Haider (PAK)

3 December 2007
18:35

Germany	4–1	Spain
Korn 4'; Witthaus 32', 61'; Montag 34'	Report	Enrique 63'

Umpires:
Roel van Eert (NED)
Kim Hong-lae (KOR)

3 December 2007
20:05

Pakistan	2–2	Malaysia
A. Ali 19'; G. Ali 35'	Report	Chua 56'; Jiwa 64'

Umpires:
Satinder Kumar (IND)
Ged Curran (SCO)

5 December 2007
16:05

Great Britain	4–1	Pakistan
Dick 15'; Moore 21'; S. Mantell 25'; Alexander 57'	Report	Imran 49'

Umpires:
Kim Hong-lae (KOR)
Simon Taylor (NZL)

5 December 2007
18:05

Netherlands	3–3	Germany
Taekema 5'; Hofman 32'; Reckers 64'	Report	Keller 14', 58'; Montag 56'

Umpires:
David Gentles (AUS)
Gary Simmonds (RSA)

5 December 2007
18:35

Australia	2–3	Spain
Doerner 41'; Eglington 68'	Report	Tubau 10'; Freixa 35', 51'

Umpires:
Ged Curran (SCO)
Amarjit Singh (MAS)

5 December 2007
20:05

Malaysia	2–3	South Korea
Selvaraju 13'; Azlan 25'	Report	Jang 6'; Oh D. 53'; You 69'

Umpires:
Syed Haider (PAK)
Satinder Kumar (IND)

6 December 2007
16:05

Australia	3–3	Netherlands
Ford 27'; Ockenden 33'; Doerner 64'	Report	Hertzberger 11'; Taekema 29'; M. Brouwer 39'

Umpires:
Ged Curran (SCO)
Xavier Adell (ESP)

6 December 2007
18:05

Pakistan	3–3	South Korea
Abbasi 26'; Waqas 58'; M. Ali 63'	Report	Seo 6'; You 44'; Jang 47'

Umpires:
Roel van Eert (NED)
David Gentles (AUS)

6 December 2007
18:35

Spain	5–0	Great Britain
R. Alegre 22', 46'; Freixa 24'; Arbos 54'; Sojo 64'	Report

Umpires:
Gary Simmonds (RSA)
Amarjit Singh (MAS)

6 December 2007
20:05

Germany	3–2	Malaysia
Keller 25', 35'; Witthaus 36'	Report	Selvaraju 54'; Ismail 62'

Umpires:
Kim Hong-lae (KOR)
Simon Taylor (NZL)

8 December 2007
16:05

Malaysia	2–7	Spain
Chua 39'; Selvaraju 42'	Report	D. Alegre 20', 45'; Sojo 23'; Tubau 25', 26'; Ribas 47'; Arbós 61'

Umpires:
Ged Curran (SCO)
Kim Hong-lae (KOR)

8 December 2007
16:35

Great Britain	2–2	South Korea
Daly 6'; Mantell 61'	Report	Kim C. 44'; Lee N. 62'

Umpires:
David Gentles (AUS)
Satinder Kumar (IND)

8 December 2007
18:05

Netherlands	4–1	Pakistan
Taekema 15', 38', 61'; De Nooijer 32'	Report	Waqas 19'

Umpires:
Amarjit Singh (MAS)
Xavier Adell (ESP)

8 December 2007
20:05

Australia	5–0	Germany
Ford 23'; Brooks 25'; Ockenden 40'; De Young 51'; Doerner 64'	Report

Umpires:
Gary Simmonds (RSA)
Roel van Eert (NED)

=== Classification ===
==== Seventh and eighth place ====
9 December 2007
12:35

Pakistan	3–2 (a.e.t.)	Malaysia
Arshad 40'; Imran 70+', 73'	Report	Tengku 58', 61'

Umpires:
Kim Hong-lae (KOR)
Satinder Kumar (IND)

==== Fifth and sixth place ====
9 December 2007
15:05

Spain	4–2	Great Britain
Sojo 6'; Ribas 14', 63'; Freixa 61'	Report	Hawes 20'; Mantell 35'

Umpires:
David Gentles (AUS)
Roel van Eert (NED)

==== Third and fourth place ====
9 December 2007
17:35

Netherlands	3–2	South Korea
Taekema 16'; Reckers 26'; Hertzberger 52'	Report	Yeo 36'; Kim B. 68'

Umpires:
Amarjit Singh (MAS)
Ged Curran (SCO)

==== Final ====
9 December 2007
20:05

Germany	1–0	Australia
Weß 5'	Report

Umpires:
Xavier Adell (ESP)
Gary Simmonds (RSA)

== Awards ==
Top Goalscorers	Best Player	Best Goalkeeper	Best Young Player	Best Player of Final	Fair Play
(Netherlands) Taeke Taekema (South Korea) Jang Jong-hyun	(Germany) Matthias Witthaus	(Netherlands) Guus Vogels	(Australia) Edward Ockenden	(Germany) Timo Weß	Great Britain

== Final standings ==
As per statistical convention in field hockey, matches decided in regular time are counted as wins and losses, while matches decided by penalty shoot-outs are counted as draws.

Pos	Team	Pld	W	D	L	GF	GA	GD	Pts	Final result
1st place, gold medalist(s)	Germany	8	6	1	1	22	14	+8	19	Gold Medal
2nd place, silver medalist(s)	Australia	8	4	1	3	15	9	+6	13	Silver Medal
3rd place, bronze medalist(s)	Netherlands	8	4	3	1	25	19	+6	15	Bronze Medal
4	South Korea	8	3	3	2	20	16	+4	12	
5	Spain	8	4	2	2	25	17	+8	14	
6	Great Britain	8	2	1	5	11	23	−12	7	
7	Pakistan	8	2	2	4	15	22	−7	8	
8	Malaysia (H)	8	0	1	7	13	26	−13	1	

Source: FIH
(H) Hosts

== Goalscorers ==
There were 146 goals scored in 32 matches, for an average of 4.56 goals per match.

7 goals

- (Netherlands) Taeke Taekema
- (South Korea) Jang Jong-hyun

6 goals

- (Netherlands) Rob Reckers

5 goals

- (Germany) Florian Keller
- (Germany) Matthias Witthaus
- (Spain) Víctor Sojo
- (Spain) Eduard Tubau

4 goals

- (Pakistan) Muhammad Waqas
- (Spain) Santiago Freixa

3 goals

- (Australia) Luke Doerner
- (Australia) Russell Ford
- (Australia) Edward Ockenden
- (Germany) Oliver Korn
- (Malaysia) Selvaraju Sandrakasi
- (Malaysia) Tengku Ahmad Tajuddin
- (Netherlands) Ronald Brouwer
- (Netherlands) Teun de Nooijer
- (Pakistan) Akhtar Ali
- (Pakistan) Muhammad Imran
- (South Korea) Lee Nam-yong
- (Spain) David Alegre
- (Spain) Eduard Arbós
- (Spain) Xavier Ribas

2 goals

- (Australia) Travis Brooks
- (Australia) Nathan Eglington
- (Germany) Sebastian Draguhn
- (Germany) Jan-Marco Montag
- (United Kingdom) Stephen Dick
- (United Kingdom) Benjamin Hawes
- (United Kingdom) Richard Mantell
- (United Kingdom) Robert Moore
- (Malaysia) Chua Boon Huat
- (Netherlands) Matthijs Brouwer
- (Netherlands) Jeroen Hertzberger
- (South Korea) You Hyo-sik
- (South Korea) Yeo Woon-kon
- (Spain) Ramón Alegre

1 goal

- (Australia) Grant Schubert
- (Australia) Liam de Young
- (Germany) Nicolas Emmerling
- (Germany) Moritz Fürste
- (Germany) Carlos Nevado
- (Germany) Timo Weß
- (Germany) Philip Witte
- (United Kingdom) Richard Alexander
- (United Kingdom) Matthew Daly
- (United Kingdom) Simon Mantell
- (Malaysia) Shahrun Abdullah
- (Malaysia) Ismail Abu
- (Malaysia) Kevinder Makbul
- (Malaysia) Azlan Misron
- (Malaysia) Jiwa Mohan
- (Netherlands) Wouter Hermkens
- (Netherlands) Rogier Hofman
- (Pakistan) Shakeel Abbasi
- (Pakistan) Ghazanfar Ali
- (Pakistan) Muhammad Ali
- (Pakistan) Muhammad Arshad
- (Pakistan) Shabbir Muhammad
- (South Korea) Kim Byung-hoon
- (South Korea) Kim Chul
- (South Korea) Oh Dae-keun
- (South Korea) Kim Jeong-goo
- (South Korea) Seo Jong-ho
- (Spain) Sergi Enrique

Source: FIH
