= 2007 Men's Hockey Hamburg Masters =

Tournament details
- Host country: Germany
- City: Hamburg
- Teams: 4
- Venue(s): Uhlenhorster HC

Final positions
- Champions: Germany (9th title)
- Runner-up: Spain
- Third place: Belgium

Tournament statistics
- Matches played: 6
- Goals scored: 31 (5.17 per match)
- Top scorer(s): (Germany) Philip Witte (Germany) Christopher Zeller (3 goals)

The 2007 Men's Hockey Hamburg Masters was the thirteenth edition of the Hamburg Masters, consisting of a series of test matches. It was held in Hamburg, Germany, from 2–5 August 2007, and featured four of the top nations in men's field hockey.

== Competition format ==
The tournament featured the national teams of Belgium, England, Spain, and the hosts, Germany, competing in a round-robin format, with each team playing each other once. Three points were awarded for a win, one for a draw, and none for a loss.

Country	2007 FIH Ranking	Best World Cup Finish	Best Olympic Games Finish
Belgium	12	Eighth Place (1973)	Third Place (1920)
England	8	Runners-Up (1986)	Champions (1920, 1988)
Germany	1	Champions (2002, 2006)	Champions (1992)
Spain	4	Runners-Up (1971, 1998)	Runners-Up (1980, 1996)

== Officials ==
The following umpires were appointed by the International Hockey Federation to officiate the tournament:

- Christian Bläsch (GER)
- Colin Hutchinson (IRE)
- Hamish Jamson (ENG)
- Rob ten Cate (NED)
- Juan Requena (ESP)

== Results ==
All times are local (Central European Summer Time).

=== Pool ===
Pos	Team	Pld	W	D	L	GF	GA	GD	Pts	Result
1	Germany (H)	3	3	0	0	14	4	+10	9	Tournament Champion
2	Spain	3	1	1	1	6	7	−1	4	
3	Belgium	3	1	1	1	5	10	−5	4	
4	England	3	0	0	3	6	10	−4	0	

Source: Deutscher Hockey-Bund
Rules for classification: 1) Points; 2) Goal difference; 3) Goals scored; 4) Games won; 5) Head-to-head.
(H) Hosts

=== Fixtures ===
2 August 2007
16:30

Spain	3–1	England
Sojo 29'; Tubau 38'; Amat 58'	Report	Clarke 49'

Umpires:
Colin Hutchinson (IRE)
Christian Bläsch (GER)

2 August 2007
18:45

Germany	6–0	Belgium
T. Weß 4'; Witthaus 7'; B. Weß 13'; Meinert 28'; Witte 32'; Fürste 54'	Report

Umpires:
Juan Requena (ESP)
Hamish Jamson (ENG)

4 August 2007
14:00

Spain	2–2	Belgium
Sojo 34'; Tubau 56'	Report	Gucassoff 49', 61'

Umpires:
Rob ten Cate (NED)
Christian Bläsch (GER)

4 August 2007
16:30

England	3–4	Germany
Tindall 10'; Daly 32'; Middleton 34'	Report	Witte 13'; C. Zeller 24', 58'; Witthaus 68'

Umpires:
Colin Hutchinson (IRE)
Juan Requena (ESP)

5 August 2007
12:00

England	2–3	Belgium
Jackson 18'; S. Mantell 27'	Report	Briels 8'; Dohmen 47'; Van den Balck 56'

Umpires:
Christian Bläsch (GER)
Colin Hutchinson (IRE)

5 August 2007
14:30

Germany	4–1	Spain
Biederlack 44'; Witte 53'; C. Zeller 59'; Fürste 64'	Report	Arbós 30'

Umpires:
Hamish Jamson (ENG)
Rob ten Cate (NED)

== Statistics ==
=== Final standings ===
1. Germany
2. Spain
3. Belgium
4. England

=== Goalscorers ===
There were 31 goals scored in 6 matches, for an average of 5.17 goals per match.

3 goals

- (Germany) Philip Witte
- (Germany) Christopher Zeller

2 goals

- (Belgium) Gregory Gucassoff
- (Germany) Moritz Fürste
- (Germany) Matthias Witthaus
- (Spain) Víctor Sojo
- (Spain) Eduardo Tubau

1 goal

- (Belgium) Thomas Briels
- (Belgium) John-John Dohmen
- (Belgium) Thomas van den Balck
- (England) Jonathan Clarke
- (England) Matthew Daly
- (England) Ashley Jackson
- (England) Simon Mantell
- (England) Barry Middleton
- (England) James Tindall
- (Germany) Sebastian Biederlack
- (Germany) Niklas Meinert
- (Germany) Benjamin Weß
- (Germany) Timo Weß
- (Spain) Pol Amat
- (Spain) Eduard Arbós
