= Field hockey at the 2008 Summer Olympics – Men's tournament =

Men's field hockey at the 2008 Summer Olympics
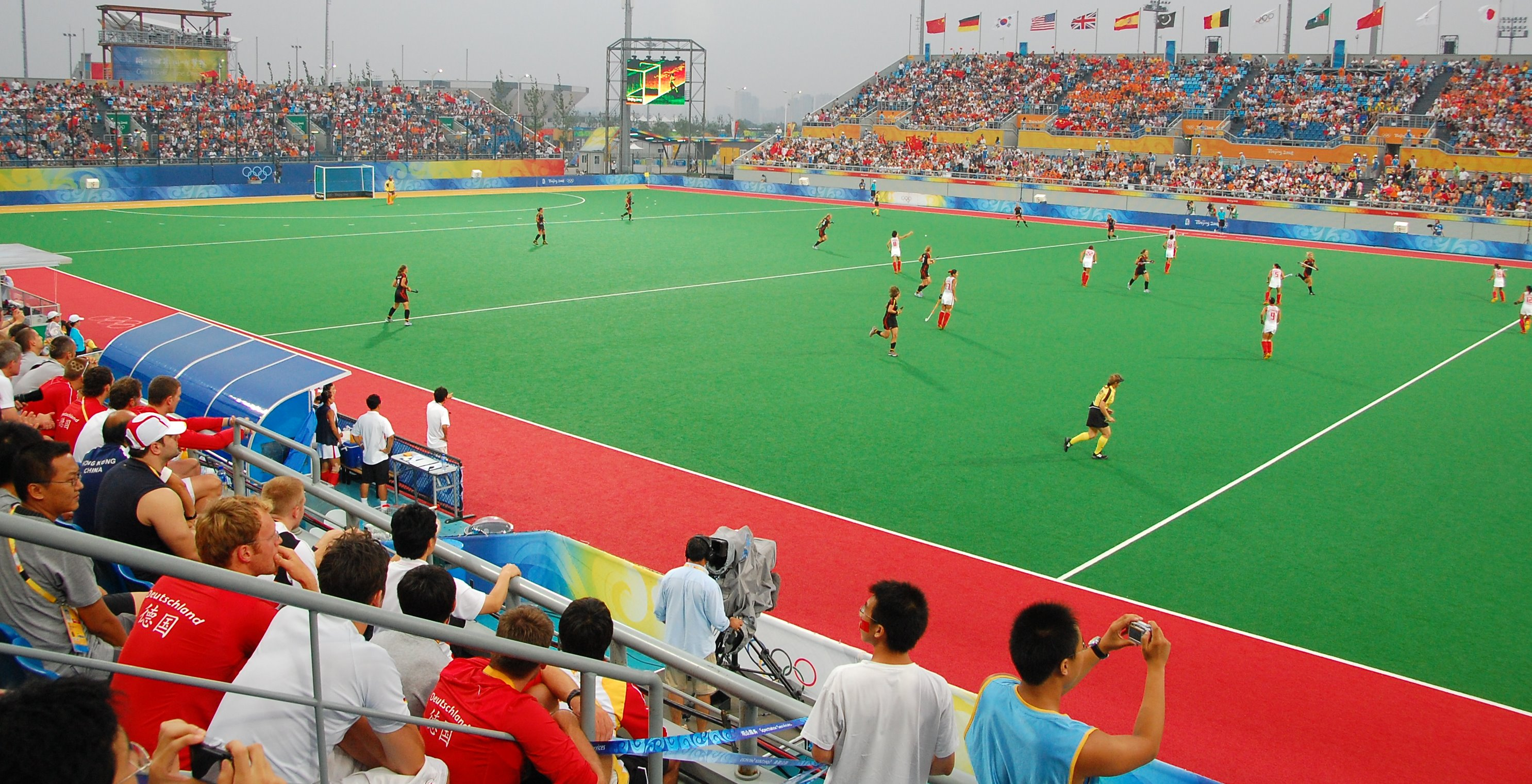
- Olympic Green Hockey Field

Tournament details
- Host country: China
- City: Beijing
- Dates: 11 – 23 August
- Teams: 12 (from 5 confederations)
- Venue: Olympic Green Hockey Field

Final positions
- Champions: Germany (3rd title)
- Runner-up: Spain
- Third place: Australia

Tournament statistics
- Matches played: 38
- Goals scored: 174 (4.58 per match)
- Top scorer: (Netherlands) Taeke Taekema (11 goals)

The men's field hockey tournament at the 2008 Summer Olympics was the 21st edition of the field hockey event for men at the Summer Olympic Games. It was held over a thirteen-day period beginning on 11 August, and culminating with the medal finals on 23 August. All games were played at the hockey field constructed on the Olympic Green in Beijing, China.

Germany won the gold medal for the third time after defeating Spain 1–0 in the final. Defending champions Australia won the bronze medal by defeating Netherlands 6–2. This was the only edition India has missed out in its Olympic history.

== Competition format ==
The twelve teams in the tournament were divided into two pools of six, with each team initially playing round-robin games within their pool. Following the completion of the round-robin, the top two teams from each pool advance to the semifinals. All other teams play classification matches to determine the final tournament rankings. The two semi-final winners meet for the gold medal match, while the semi-final losers play in the bronze medal match.

== Qualification ==
Each of the continental champions from five federations and host received an automatic berth. The European and Asian federations received two and one extra quotas respectively based upon the FIH World Rankings at the completion of the 2006 World Cup. In addition to the three teams qualifying through the Olympic Qualifying Tournaments, the following twelve teams, shown with final pre-tournament rankings, competed in this tournament.

Date	Event	Location	Quotas	Qualifiers
Hosts			1	China (17)
2–14 December 2006	2006 Asian Games	Doha, Qatar	2	South Korea (5); Pakistan (6)
14–22 July 2007	2007 African Olympic Qualifier	Nairobi, Kenya	1	South Africa (13)
14–29 July 2007	2007 Pan American Games	Rio de Janeiro, Brazil	1	Canada (15)
18–25 August 2007	2007 EuroHockey Championship	Manchester, England	3	Netherlands (3); Spain (4); Belgium (12)
11–17 September 2007	2007 Oceania Cup	Buderim, Australia	1	Australia (2)
2–10 February 2008	Olympic Qualifying Tournament 1	Auckland, New Zealand	1	New Zealand (10)
1–9 March 2008	Olympic Qualifying Tournament 2	Santiago, Chile	1	Great Britain (8)
5–13 April 2008	Olympic Qualifying Tournament 3	Kakamigahara, Japan	1	Germany (1)
Total			12	

== Umpires ==
Fifteen umpires for the men's event were appointed by the FIH. During each match, a video umpire was used to assist the on-field umpires in determining if a goal had been legally scored.

- Xavier Adell (ESP)
- Christian Blasch (GER)
- Chen Dekang (CHN)
- Henrik Ehlers (DEN)
- David Gentles (AUS)
- Murray Grime (AUS)
- Kim Hong-lae (KOR)
- Satinder Kumar (IND)
- David Leiper (GBR)
- Andy Mair (GBR)
- Gary Simmonds (RSA)
- Amarjit Singh (MAS)
- Rob ten Cate (NED)
- Roel van Eert (NED)
- John Wright (RSA)

== Preliminary round ==
All times are China Standard Time (UTC+08:00)

=== Pool A ===
Pos	Team	Pld	W	D	L	GF	GA	GD	Pts	Qualification
1	Spain	5	4	0	1	9	5	+4	12	Semi-finals
2	Germany	5	3	2	0	12	6	+6	11	Semi-finals
3	South Korea	5	2	1	2	13	11	+2	7	Fifth place game
4	New Zealand	5	2	1	2	10	9	+1	7	Seventh place game
5	Belgium	5	1	1	3	9	13	−4	4	Ninth place game
6	China (H)	5	0	1	4	7	16	−9	1	Eleventh place game

(H) Hosts

11 August 2008
08:30

Germany	4–1	China
C. Zeller 21'; Keller 43', 54'; Nevado 68'	Report	Na Yubo 7'

Umpires:
David Leiper (GBR)
Satinder Kumar (IND)

11 August 2008
18:00

South Korea	1–3	New Zealand
Lee Nam-yong 12'	Report	H. Shaw 43', 57', 64'

Umpires:
David Gentles (AUS)
Andy Mair (GBR)

11 August 2008
20:30

Spain	4–2	Belgium
Amat 8'; Freixa 20'; Ribas 41'; Sojo 49'	Report	Truyens 26'; Dekeyser 63'

Umpires:
Murray Grime (AUS)
Roel van Eert (NED)

13 August 2008
10:30

China	2–5	South Korea
Na Yubo 6'; Song Yi 8'	Report	Seo Jong-ho 13'; Jang Jong-hyun 35+', 55', 57'; Kang Seong-jung 67'

Umpires:
Amarjit Singh (MAS)
Henrik Ehlers (DEN)

13 August 2008
18:30

Belgium	1–1	Germany
Charlier 22'	Report	Witthaus 19'

Umpires:
Rob ten Cate (NED)
David Gentles (AUS)

13 August 2008
20:30

New Zealand	0–1	Spain
	Report	Freixa 70'

Umpires:
John Wright (RSA)
Christian Blasch (GER)

15 August 2008
08:30

Spain	2–1	China
Ribas 17'; Amat 67'	Report	Na Yubo 6'

Umpires:
David Gentles (AUS)
Kim Hong-lae (KOR)

15 August 2008
18:00

Belgium	2–4	New Zealand
Dekeyser 43'; Gucassoff 69'	Report	Child 19', 20'; Brooks 30'; McAleese 60'

Umpires:
David Leiper (GBR)
Xavier Adell (ESP)

15 August 2008
20:30

South Korea	3–3	Germany
Yeo Woon-kon 5'; Jang Jong-hyun 46'; Seo Jong-ho 52'	Report	Witte 17'; Witthaus 40'; C. Zeller 47'

Umpires:
John Wright (RSA)
Satinder Kumar (IND)

17 August 2008
10:30

South Korea	3–1	Belgium
You Hyo-sik 46', 51'; Jang Jong-hyun 50'	Report	Dekeyser 20'

Umpires:
Rob ten Cate (NED)
Satinder Kumar (IND)

17 August 2008
18:30

New Zealand	2–2	China
Child 34'; McAleese 54'	Report	Song Yi 3', 17'

Umpires:
Murray Grime (AUS)
Andy Mair (GBR)

17 August 2008
21:00

Germany	1–0	Spain
Fürste 34'	Report

Umpires:
John Wright (RSA)
David Gentles (AUS)

19 August 2008
10:30

Germany	3–1	New Zealand
T. Weß 5'; Witthaus 9'; Keller 55'	Report	H. Shaw 46'

Umpires:
David Gentles (AUS)
Andy Mair (GBR)

19 August 2008
18:30

South Korea	1–2	Spain
Yoon Sung-hoon 69'	Report	Freixa 12', 53'

Umpires:
Henrik Ehlers (DEN)
John Wright (USA)

19 August 2008
21:00

China	1–3	Belgium
Song Yi 4'	Report	Reckinger 28'; Truyens 32'; Dohmen 48'

Umpires:
Murray Grime (AUS)
Gary Simmonds (RSA)

=== Pool B ===
Pos	Team	Pld	W	D	L	GF	GA	GD	Pts	Qualification
1	Netherlands	5	4	1	0	16	6	+10	13	Semi-finals
2	Australia	5	3	2	0	24	7	+17	11	Semi-finals
3	Great Britain	5	2	2	1	10	7	+3	8	Fifth place game
4	Pakistan	5	2	0	3	11	13	−2	6	Seventh place game
5	Canada	5	1	1	3	10	17	−7	4	Ninth place game
6	South Africa	5	0	0	5	4	25	−21	0	Eleventh place game

11 August 2008
10:30

Pakistan	2–4	Great Britain
Abbasi 45'; Waqas 59'	Report	Tindall 2'; Moore 14'; Jackson 29'; Daly 62'

Umpires:
John Wright (RSA)
Amarjit Singh (MAS)

11 August 2008
18:30

Australia	6–1	Canada
Abbott 15', 16', 54'; Kavanagh 22'; Ockenden 48'; Schubert 57'	Report	P. Short 38'

Umpires:
Christian Blasch (GER)
Chen Dekang (CHN)

11 August 2008
21:00

Netherlands	5–0	South Africa
Taekema 4', 35'; Docherty 44'; Hertzberger 47'; M. Brouwer 66'	Report

Umpires:
Henrik Ehlers (DEN)
Xavier Adell (ESP)

13 August 2008
08:30

South Africa	0–10	Australia
	Report	Dwyer 2', 42'; Matheson 14', 29', 57'; Schubert 27'; Guest 35+', 38'; Kavanagh 47'; Abbott 67'

Umpires:
Andy Mair (GBR)
Roel van Eert (NED)

13 August 2008
18:00

Canada	1–3	Pakistan
Kullar 35'	Report	Imran 39'; Rasool 39'; Waqas 57'

Umpires:
Kim Hong-lae (KOR)
David Leiper (GBR)

13 August 2008
21:00

Netherlands	1–0	Great Britain
Taekema 63'	Report

Umpires:
Murray Grime (AUS)
Gary Simmonds (RSA)

15 August 2008
10:30

Netherlands	4–2	Canada
Taekema 4', 8', 33'; Weusthof 49'	Report	Deol 12'; Kahlon 64'

Umpires:
Murray Grime (AUS)
Chen Dekang (CHN)

15 August 2008
18:30

Pakistan	1–3	Australia
Abbasi 16'	Report	Schubert 20'; Dwyer 41'; Brooks 59'

Umpires:
Henrik Ehlers (DEN)
Gary Simmonds (RSA)

15 August 2008
21:00

South Africa	0–2	Great Britain
	Report	Tindall 20'; Daly 66'

Umpires:
Christian Blasch (GER)
Rob ten Cate (NED)

17 August 2008
08:30

Great Britain	1–1	Canada
Daly 67'	Report	Pereira 47'

Umpires:
Roel van Eert (NED)
Gary Simmonds (RSA)

17 August 2008
18:00

Pakistan	3–1	South Africa
Javed 9'; Abbasi 44'; Saqlain 60'	Report	Smith 31'

Umpires:
Amarjit Singh (MAS)
Kim Hong-lae (KOR)

17 August 2008
20:30

Australia	2–2	Netherlands
Ockenden 58'; Doerner 61'	Report	Taekema 55', 70'

Umpires:
Henrik Ehlers (DEN)
Christian Blasch (GER)

19 August 2008
08:30

Netherlands	4–2	Pakistan
Brouwer 41'; Taekema 46', 58'; Hertzberger 69'	Report	Imran 28'; Maqsood 65'

Umpires:
David Leiper (GBR)
Kim Hong-lae (KOR)

19 August 2008
18:00

Canada	5–3	South Africa
R. Short 15'; Fernandes 31', 46'; Grimes 38', 70'	Report	Smith 4', 51'; Tsolekile 28'

Umpires:
Roel van Eert (NED)
Satinder Kumar (IND)

19 August 2008
20:30

Australia	3–3	Great Britain
George 40'; Dwyer 45'; Ockenden 68'	Report	Middleton 34'; R. Mantell 47'; Moore 55'

Umpires:
Christian Blasch (GER)
Xavier Adell (ESP)

== Classification round ==
=== Fifth to twelfth place classification ===
==== Eleventh and twelfth place ====
23 August 2008
08:30

China	4–3 (a.e.t.)	South Africa
Na Yubo 32'; Song Yi 53', 58', 85'	Report	Tsolekile 3'; Symons 63'; Smith 70'

Umpires:
Rob ten Cate (NED)
Satinder Kumar (IND)

==== Ninth and tenth place ====
21 August 2008
08:30

Belgium	3–0	Canada
Dekeyser 2', 70'; Dohmen 23'	Report

Umpires:
David Leiper (GBR)
Xavier Adell (ESP)

==== Seventh and eighth place ====
21 August 2008
11:00

New Zealand	4–2	Pakistan
Child 26'; H. Shaw 39', 53'; Brooks 43'	Report	Bilgrami 46'; Butt 56'

Umpires:
Kim Hong-lae (KOR)
Gary Simmonds (RSA)

==== Fifth and sixth place ====
23 August 2008
11:00

South Korea	2–5	Great Britain
Jang Jong-hyun 48'; Hyun Hye-sung 67'	Report	Middleton 44'; Jackson 49'; Clarke 54', 63'; Kirkham 70'

Umpires:
Murray Grime (AUS)
Roel van Eert (NED)

=== Medal round ===
Semi-finals
21 August
Netherlands	1 (3)
Germany (p.s.o.)	1 (4)
21 August
Spain	3
Australia	2

Gold medal match
23 August
Germany	1
Spain	0
Bronze medal match
23 August
Netherlands	2
Australia	6

==== Semi-finals ====
21 August 2008
18:00

Netherlands	1–1 (a.e.t.)	Germany
Hoyng 66'	Report	P. Zeller 68'
Penalties
Taekema (penalty shoot-out scored); R. Brouwer (penalty shoot-out scored); Reckers (penalty shoot-out missed); Weusthof (penalty shoot-out missed); De Nooijer (penalty shoot-out scored) --- Taekema (penalty shoot-out missed)	3–4	(penalty shoot-out scored) C. Zeller; (penalty shoot-out missed) Keller; (penalty shoot-out scored) Meinert; (penalty shoot-out missed) P. Zeller; (penalty shoot-out scored) Weißenborn --- (penalty shoot-out scored) C. Zeller

Umpires:
David Gentles (AUS)
John Wright (RSA)

21 August 2008
20:30

Spain	3−2	Australia
Tubau 39', 44'; Freixa 68'	Report	Abbott 1'; Ockenden 37'

Umpires:
Henrik Ehlers (DEN)
Christian Blasch (GER)

==== Bronze medal match ====
23 August 2008
18:00

Netherlands	2–6	Australia (bronze)
Taekema 12'; De Nooijer 27'	Report	Ockenden 5', 6'; Abbott 9'; Matheson 28'; Hammond 42'; Doerner 62'

Umpires:
Andy Mair (GBR)
Christian Blasch (GER)

==== Gold medal match ====
23 August 2008
20:30

(gold) Germany	1–0	Spain (silver)
C. Zeller 16'	Report

Umpires:
Henrik Ehlers (DEN)
David Gentles (AUS)

== Statistics ==
=== Final standings ===
1. Germany
2. Spain
3. Australia
4. Netherlands
5. Great Britain
6. South Korea
7. New Zealand
8. Pakistan
9. Belgium
10. Canada
11. China
12. South Africa

=== Goalscorers ===
There were 174 goals scored in 38 matches, for an average of 4.58 goals per match.

11 goals

- (Netherlands) Taeke Taekema

7 goals

- (China) Song Yi
- (New Zealand) Hayden Shaw

6 goals

- (Australia) Des Abbott
- (Australia) Eddie Ockenden
- (South Korea) Jang Jong-hyun

5 goals

- (Belgium) Jérôme Dekeyser
- (Spain) Santi Freixa

4 goals

- (Australia) Jamie Dwyer
- (Australia) Eli Matheson
- (China) Na Yubo
- (New Zealand) Simon Child
- (South Africa) Austin Smith

3 goals

- (Australia) Grant Schubert
- (Germany) Florian Keller
- (Germany) Matthias Witthaus
- (Germany) Christopher Zeller
- (United Kingdom) Matt Daly
- (Pakistan) Shakeel Abbasi

2 goals

- (Australia) Luke Doerner
- (Australia) David Guest
- (Australia) Fergus Kavanagh
- (Belgium) John-John Dohmen
- (Belgium) Jérôme Truyens
- (Canada) Wayne Fernandes
- (Canada) Connor Grimes
- (United Kingdom) Jonty Clarke
- (United Kingdom) Ashley Jackson
- (United Kingdom) Barry Middleton
- (United Kingdom) Rob Moore
- (United Kingdom) James Tindall
- (Netherlands) Matthijs Brouwer
- (Netherlands) Jeroen Hertzberger
- (New Zealand) Gareth Brooks
- (New Zealand) Shea McAleese
- (Pakistan) Muhammad Imran
- (Pakistan) Muhammad Waqas
- (South Africa) Lungile Tsolekile
- (South Korea) Seo Jong-ho
- (South Korea) You Hyo-sik
- (Spain) Pol Amat
- (Spain) Xavier Ribas
- (Spain) Eduard Tubau

1 goal

- (Australia) Travis Brooks
- (Australia) Bevan George
- (Australia) Robert Hammond
- (Belgium) Cédric Charlier
- (Belgium) Gregory Gucassoff
- (Belgium) Xavier Reckinger
- (Canada) Ranjeev Deol
- (Canada) Bindi Kullar
- (Canada) Ken Pereira
- (Canada) Peter Short
- (Canada) Rob Short
- (Germany) Moritz Fürste
- (Germany) Carlos Nevado
- (Germany) Timo Weß
- (Germany) Philip Witte
- (Germany) Philipp Zeller
- (United Kingdom) Glenn Kirkham
- (United Kingdom) Richard Mantell
- (Netherlands) Teun de Nooijer
- (Netherlands) Laurence Docherty
- (Netherlands) Timme Hoyng
- (Netherlands) Roderick Weusthof
- (Pakistan) Rehan Butt
- (Pakistan) Syed Abbas Haider Bilgrami
- (Pakistan) Muhammad Javed
- (Pakistan) Adnan Maqsood
- (Pakistan) Shafqat Rasool
- (Pakistan) Muhammad Saqlain
- (South Africa) Ian Symons
- (South Korea) Hyun Hye-sung
- (South Korea) Kang Seong-jung
- (South Korea) Lee Nam-yong
- (South Korea) Yeo Woon-kon
- (South Korea) Yoon Sung-hoon
- (Spain) Víctor Sojo
