= Field hockey at the 2008 Summer Olympics =

Field hockey at the Games of the XXIX Olympiad
- Venue: Olympic Green Hockey Field
- Dates: 10–23 August 2008
- No. of events: 2
- Competitors: 387 from 15 nations

Field hockey at the 2008 Summer Olympics in Beijing was held over a fourteen-day period beginning on 10 August, culminating with the medal finals on 22 and 23 August. All games were played at the hockey field constructed on the Olympic Green.

== Competition format ==
Twelve teams competed in both the men's and women's Olympic hockey tournaments with the competition consisting of two rounds. In the first round, teams were divided into two pools of six teams, and play followed the round robin format with each of the teams playing all other teams in the pool once. Teams were awarded three points for a win, one point for a draw and zero points for a loss. At the end of the pool matches, teams were ranked in their pool according to the following criteria, in order:

- Total points accumulated
- Number of matches won
- Goal difference
- Goals for
- The result of the match played between the teams in question

Following the completion of the pool games, teams placing first and second in each pool advanced to a single elimination round consisting of two semifinal games, and the bronze and gold medal games. Remaining teams competed in classification matches to determine their ranking in the tournament. During these matches, extra time of 7 1/2 minutes per half was played if teams were tied at the end of regulation time. During extra time, play followed golden goal rules, with the first team to score declared the winner. If no goals were scored during extra time, a penalty stroke competition took place.

== Competition schedule ==
The competition schedule was released on 29 May 2008, by the International Hockey Federation and Beijing Organizing Committee for the Olympic Games.

Field hockey at the 2008 Summer Olympics
August	8	9	10	11	12	13	14	15	16	17	18	19	20	21	22	23	24
															W	M	

Round robin matches	Classification matches	W	Medal games – Women	M	Medal games – Men

== Qualification ==
=== Men's qualification ===
Each of the continental champions from five federations and host received an automatic berth. The European and Asian federations received two and one extra quotas respectively, based upon the FIH World Rankings at the completion of the 2006 World Cup. In addition to the three teams qualifying through the Olympic Qualifying Tournaments, the following twelve teams, shown with final pre-tournament rankings, competed in this tournament.

Date	Event	Location	Quotas	Qualifiers
Hosts			1	China (17)
2–14 December 2006	2006 Asian Games	Doha, Qatar	2	South Korea (5); Pakistan (6)
14–22 July 2007	2007 African Olympic Qualifier	Nairobi, Kenya	1	South Africa (13)
14–29 July 2007	2007 Pan American Games	Rio de Janeiro, Brazil	1	Canada (15)
18–25 August 2007	2007 EuroHockey Championship	Manchester, England	3	Netherlands (3); Spain (4); Belgium (12)
11–17 September 2007	2007 Oceania Cup	Buderim, Australia	1	Australia (2)
2–10 February 2008	Olympic Qualifying Tournament 1	Auckland, New Zealand	1	New Zealand (10)
1–9 March 2008	Olympic Qualifying Tournament 2	Santiago, Chile	1	Great Britain (8)
5–13 April 2008	Olympic Qualifying Tournament 3	Kakamigahara, Japan	1	Germany (1)
Total			12	

=== Women's qualification ===
Each of the continental champions from five federations and host received an automatic berth. The European federation received two extra quotas, while Oceania received one extra quota, based upon the FIH World Rankings at the completion of the 2006 World Cup. In addition to the three teams qualifying through the Olympic Qualifying Tournaments, the following twelve teams, shown with final pre-tournament rankings, competed in this tournament.

Dates	Event	Location	Quotas	Qualifier(s)
Host nation			1	China (5)
2–14 December 2006	2006 Asian Games	Doha, Qatar	1	Japan^{1} (6)
14–22 July 2007	2007 African Olympic Qualifier	Nairobi, Kenya	1	South Africa (12)
14–29 July 2007	2007 Pan American Games	Rio de Janeiro, Brazil	1	Argentina (2)
18–25 August 2007	2007 EuroHockey Championship	Manchester, England	3	Germany (3); Netherlands (1); Great Britain (10)
10–17 September 2007	2007 Oceania Cup	Buderim, Australia	2	New Zealand (7); Australia (4)
12–20 April 2008	Olympic Qualifying Tournament 1	Baku, Azerbaijan	1	Spain (8)
19–27 April 2008	Olympic Qualifying Tournament 2	Kazan, Russia	1	United States (11)
26 April – 4 May 2008	Olympic Qualifying Tournament 3	Victoria, Canada	1	South Korea (9)
Total			12	

^1 – China qualified both as host and continental champion; therefore, that quota was given to the Asian federation, allowing Japan to qualify directly for the 2008 Summer Olympics as the second-placed team at the 2006 Asian Games .

== Men's tournament ==
=== First round ===
==== Pool A ====
Pos	Team	Pld	W	D	L	GF	GA	GD	Pts	Qualification
1	Spain	5	4	0	1	9	5	+4	12	Semi-finals
2	Germany	5	3	2	0	12	6	+6	11	Semi-finals
3	South Korea	5	2	1	2	13	11	+2	7	Fifth place game
4	New Zealand	5	2	1	2	10	9	+1	7	Seventh place game
5	Belgium	5	1	1	3	9	13	−4	4	Ninth place game
6	China (H)	5	0	1	4	7	16	−9	1	Eleventh place game

(H) Hosts

==== Pool B ====
Pos	Team	Pld	W	D	L	GF	GA	GD	Pts	Qualification
1	Netherlands	5	4	1	0	16	6	+10	13	Semi-finals
2	Australia	5	3	2	0	24	7	+17	11	Semi-finals
3	Great Britain	5	2	2	1	10	7	+3	8	Fifth place game
4	Pakistan	5	2	0	3	11	13	−2	6	Seventh place game
5	Canada	5	1	1	3	10	17	−7	4	Ninth place game
6	South Africa	5	0	0	5	4	25	−21	0	Eleventh place game

=== Medal round ===
Semi-finals
21 August
Netherlands	1 (3)
Germany (p.s.o.)	1 (4)
21 August
Spain	3
Australia	2

Gold medal match
23 August
Germany	1
Spain	0
Bronze medal match
23 August
Netherlands	2
Australia	6

=== Final ranking ===
1. Germany
2. Spain
3. Australia
4. Netherlands
5. Great Britain
6. South Korea
7. New Zealand
8. Pakistan
9. Belgium
10. Canada
11. China
12. South Africa

== Women's tournament ==
=== First round ===
==== Pool A ====
Team	Pld	W	D	L	GF	GA	GD	Pts	Qualification
Netherlands	5	5	0	0	14	3	+11	15	Advanced to semifinals
China	5	3	1	1	14	4	+10	10	Advanced to semifinals
Australia	5	3	1	1	17	9	+8	10	
Spain	5	2	0	3	4	12	−8	6	
South Korea	5	1	0	4	13	18	−5	3	
South Africa	5	0	0	5	2	18	−16	0	

==== Pool B ====
Team	Pld	W	D	L	GF	GA	GD	Pts	Qualification
Germany	5	4	0	1	12	8	+4	12	Advanced to semifinals
Argentina	5	3	2	0	13	7	+6	11	Advanced to semifinals
Great Britain	5	2	2	1	7	9	−2	8	
United States	5	1	3	1	9	8	+1	6	
Japan	5	1	1	3	5	7	−2	4	
New Zealand	5	0	0	5	6	13	−7	0	

=== Medal round ===
Semi-finals
20 August
Germany	2
China	3
20 August
Netherlands	5
Argentina	2

Gold medal match
22 August
China	0
Netherlands	2
Bronze medal match
22 August
Germany	1
Argentina	3

=== Final ranking ===
1. Netherlands
2. China
3. Argentina
4. Germany
5. Australia
6. Great Britain
7. Spain
8. United States
9. South Korea
10. Japan
11. South Africa
12. New Zealand

== Medal summary ==
=== Medal table ===
* Host nation (China)

Rank	Nation	Gold	Silver	Bronze	Total
1	Germany	1	0	0	1
1	Netherlands	1	0	0	1
3	China*	0	1	0	1
3	Spain	0	1	0	1
5	Argentina	0	0	1	1
5	Australia	0	0	1	1
Totals (6 entries)		2	2	2	6

=== Medalists ===
Event	Gold	Silver	Bronze
Men	Germany; Philip Witte; Maximilian Mueller; Sebastian Biederlack; Carlos Nevado; Moritz Fuerste; Jan-Marco Montag; Tobias Hauke; Tibor Weißenborn; Benjamin Weß; Niklas Meinert; Timo Weß; Oliver Korn; Christopher Zeller; Max Weinhold; Matthias Witthaus; Florian Keller; Philipp Zeller	Spain; Francisco Cortes; Santiago Freixa; Francisco Fábregas; Víctor Sojo; Alex Fàbregas; Pablo Amat; Eduardo Tubau; Roc Oliva; Juan Fernandez; Ramón Alegre; Xavier Ribas; Albert Sala; Rodrigo Garza; Sergi Enrique; Eduard Arbós; David Alegre	Australia; Jamie Dwyer; Liam de Young; Rob Hammond; Mark Knowles; Eddie Ockenden; David Guest; Luke Doerner; Grant Schubert; Bevan George; Andrew Smith; Stephen Lambert; Eli Matheson; Matthew Wells; Travis Brooks; Kiel Brown; Fergus Kavanagh; Des Abbott
Women	Netherlands; Maartje Goderie; Maartje Paumen; Naomi van As; Minke Smabers; Marilyn Agliotti; Minke Booij; Wieke Dijkstra; Sophie Polkamp; Ellen Hoog; Lidewij Welten; Lisanne de Roever; Miek van Geenhuizen; Eva de Goede; Janneke Schopman; Eefke Mulder; Fatima Moreira de Melo	China; Ren Ye; Zhang Yimeng; Gao Lihua; Chen Qiuqi; Zhao Yudiao; Li Hongxia; Cheng Hui; Tang Chunling; Zhou Wanfeng; Ma Yibo; Fu Baorong; Pan Fengzhen; Huang Junxia; Song Qingling; Li Shuang; Chen Zhaoxia	Argentina; Paola Vukojicic; Belén Succi; Magdalena Aicega; Mercedes Margalot; Mariana Rossi; Noel Barrionuevo; Giselle Kañevsky; Claudia Burkart; Luciana Aymar; Mariné Russo; Mariana González Oliva; Soledad García; Alejandra Gulla; María de la Paz Hernández; Carla Rebecchi; Rosario Luchetti
