= 2012 Men's VISA International Hockey Tournament =

Field hockey tournament

VISA International
Tournament details
- Host country: United Kingdom
- City: London
- Dates: 2–6 May
- Teams: 4 (from 3 confederations)
- Venue: Riverbank Arena

Final positions
- Champions: Germany
- Runner-up: Australia
- Third place: Great Britain

Tournament statistics
- Matches played: 8
- Goals scored: 37 (4.63 per match)
- Top scorer(s): (Germany) Florian Fuchs (United Kingdom) Ashley Jackson (4 goals)

The 2012 Men's VISA International Hockey Tournament was a men's field hockey tournament, consisting of a series of test matches. It was held in London, United Kingdom, from May 2 to 6, 2012. The tournament served as a test event for the field hockey tournament at the 2012 Summer Olympics. The tournament featured four of the top nations in women's field hockey.

Germany won the tournament after defeating Australia 5–2 in the final. Great Britain finished in third place after defeating India 2–1 in the third place playoff.

== Competition format ==
The tournament featured the national teams of Australia, Germany, India, and the hosts, Great Britain, competing in a round-robin format, with each team playing each other once. Three points were awarded for a win, one for a draw, and none for a loss.

Country	Best World Cup finish	Best Olympic Games finish
Australia	Champions (1986, 2010)	Champions (2004)
Germany ^	Champions (2002, 2006)	Champions (1972, 1992, 2008)
Great Britain *	Runners-Up (1986)	Champions (1908, 1920, 1988)
India	Champions (1975)	Champions (1928, 1932, 1936, 1948, 1952, 1956, 1964, 1980)

^ Includes results representing West Germany.
* Includes results representing England.

== Results ==
=== Pool Stage ===
Pos	Team	Pld	W	D	L	GF	GA	GD	Pts	Qualification
1	Germany	3	3	0	0	8	4	+4	9	Final
2	Australia	3	1	1	1	8	6	+2	4	Final
3	Great Britain (H)	3	1	1	1	8	8	0	4	
4	India	3	0	0	3	3	9	−6	0	

Source: GB Hockey
Rules for classification: 1) Points; 2) Goal difference; 3) Goals scored; 4) Games won; 5) Head-to-head.
(H) Hosts

2 May 2012
16:15

Australia	3–0	India
Ford 23'; Gohdes 43'; Doerner 64'	Report

2 May 2012
18:30

Great Britain	1–3	Germany
Jackson 62'	Report	Fuchs 36'; C. Zeller 52'; Fürste 54'

3 May 2012
16:15

Germany	3–2	Australia
Fürste 19'; Fuchs 30'; C. Zeller 69'	Report	Ford 12'; Ockenden 70'

3 May 2012
18:30

Great Britain	4–2	India
Moore 4'; Mantell 11'; Jackson 24', 26'	Report	Raghunath 16'; Sandeep 47'

5 May 2012
14:45

Germany	2–1	India
Wesley 27'; Fuchs 65'	Report	Shivendra 15'

5 May 2012
17:00

Australia	3–3	Great Britain
Gohdes 26'; Wilson 35'; Orchard 52'	Report	Tindall 19'; Alexander 30'; Jackson 66'

=== Classification matches ===
==== Third and fourth place ====
6 May 2012
15:45

Great Britain	2–1	India
Tindall 35'; Moore 47'	Report	Raghunath 24'

==== Final ====
6 May 2012
18:30

Germany	5–2	Australia
Matania 18'; Stralkowski 34'; Fuchs 37'; Witthaus 61'; P. Zeller 68'	Report	Ciriello 18'; Gohdes 57'

== Statistics ==
=== Final standings ===
As per statistical convention in field hockey, matches decided in extra time are counted as wins and losses, while matches decided by penalty shoot-outs are counted as draws.

Pos	Team	Pld	W	D	L	GF	GA	GD	Pts	Final Result
1st place, gold medalist(s)	Germany	4	4	0	0	13	6	+7	12	Gold Medal
2nd place, silver medalist(s)	Australia	4	1	1	2	10	11	−1	4	Silver Medal
3rd place, bronze medalist(s)	Great Britain (H)	4	2	1	1	10	9	+1	7	Bronze Medal
4	India	4	0	0	4	4	11	−7	0	Fourth Place

Source: GB Hockey
(H) Hosts

=== Goalscorers ===
There were 37 goals scored in 8 matches, for an average of 4.62 goals per match.

4 goals

- (Germany) Florian Fuchs
- (United Kingdom) Ashley Jackson

3 goals

- (Australia) Matt Gohdes

2 goals

- (Australia) Russell Ford
- (Germany) Moritz Fürste
- (Germany) Christopher Zeller
- (United Kingdom) Rob Moore
- (United Kingdom) James Tindall
- (India) V. R. Raghunath

1 goal

- (Australia) Chris Ciriello
- (Australia) Luke Doerner
- (Australia) Eddie Ockenden
- (Australia) Simon Orchard
- (Australia) Jason Wilson
- (Germany) Christopher Wesley
- (Germany) Tobias Matania
- (Germany) Thilo Stralkowski
- (Germany) Matthias Witthaus
- (Germany) Philipp Zeller
- (United Kingdom) Simon Mantell
- (United Kingdom) Richard Alexander
- (India) Sandeep Singh
- (India) Shivendra Singh

Source: GB Hockey
