= Jérôme Dekeyser =

Belgian field hockey player

Jérôme Dekeyser (born 15 December 1983) is a Belgian international field hockey player for Braxgata in Antwerp who is usually plays as an attacker.

At the 2008 and 2012 Summer Olympics, he competed for the national team in the men's tournament; Belgium qualified for the 2008 Olympic tournament by coming third at the European Championship in Manchester. At this 2007 European Championship, Dekeyser gave Belgium the lead for the first time in their match against Germany by scoring the 3-2 from a penalty corner. In the first match for Belgium at the Summer Olympics in Beijing, against Spain, he scored again from a penalty corner. Belgium lost the game 4–2. Eventually the Belgian team finished ninth in Beijing. In 2011 Dekeyser placed fourth with Belgium at the European Championship in Germany, and at the 2012 Summer Olympics in London they finished fifth. He became European vice-champion with Belgium at the 2013 European Championship on home ground in Boom.
