= Fergus Kavanagh =

Australian field hockey player (born 1985)

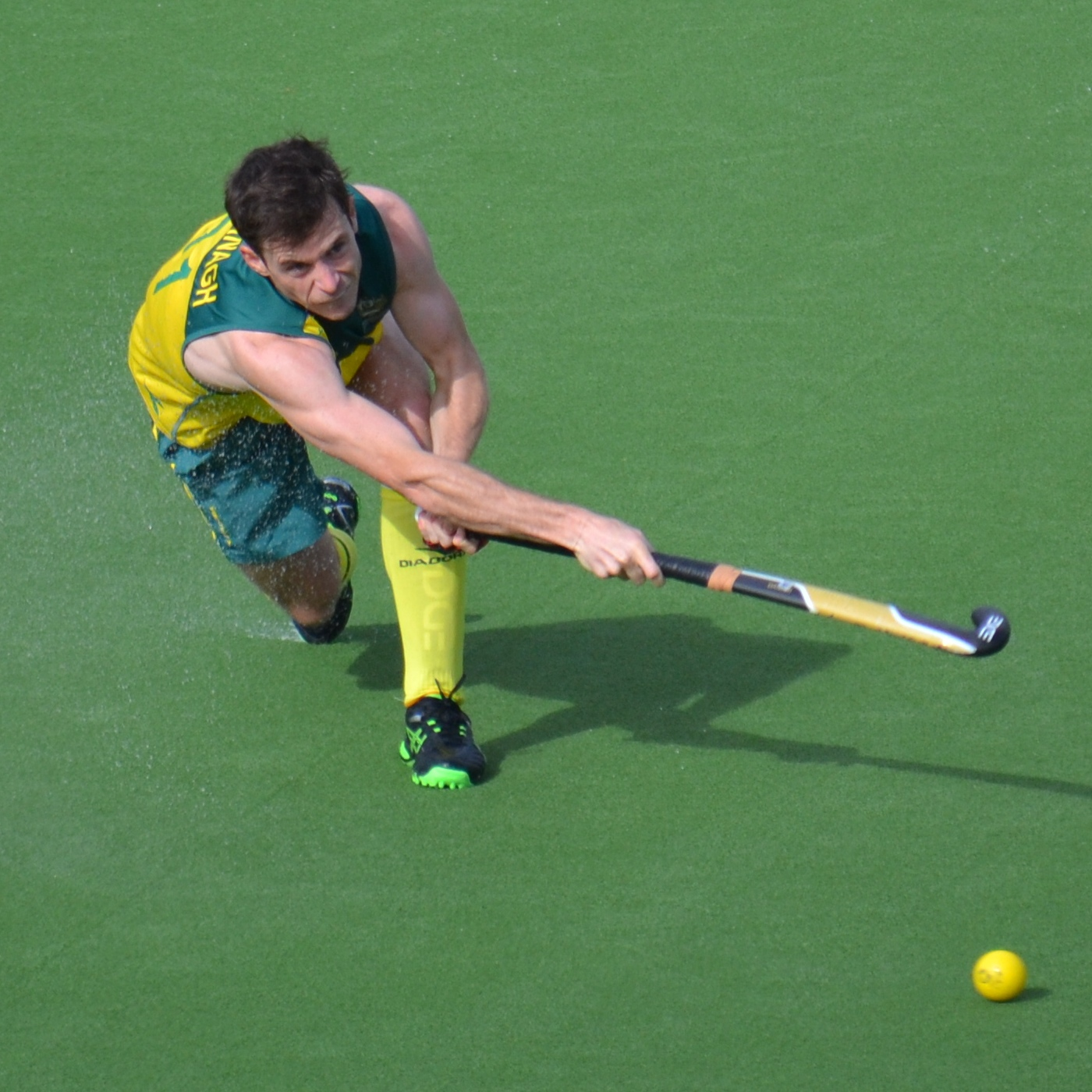
- Kavanagh in 2014

Personal information
- Born: 21 May 1985 (age 41) Dublin, Ireland

Sport
- Sport: Field hockey
Medal record
Men's field hockey
Representing Australia
Olympic Games
Bronze medal – third place	2008 Beijing	Team
Bronze medal – third place	2012 London	Team
World Cup
Gold medal – first place	2010 Delhi	Team
Gold medal – first place	2014 The Hague	Team
Champions Trophy
Gold medal – first place	2008 Rotterdam	Team
Gold medal – first place	2009 Melbourne	Team
Gold medal – first place	2010 Monchengladbach	Team
Gold medal – first place	2011 Auckland	Team
Gold medal – first place	2012 Melbourne	Team
Bronze medal – third place	2014 Bhubaneswar	Team
Commonwealth Games
Gold medal – first place	2010 Delhi	Team

Fergus Kavanagh (born 21 May 1985) is an Australian field hockey player. He plays Western Australia in the Australian Hockey League. He is a member of the Australia men's national field hockey team, winning a bronze medal with the team at the 2008 Summer Olympics and 2012 Summer Olympics. He won a gold medal at the 2010 Commonwealth Games and at the 2014 Commonwealth Games.

== Personal ==
Kavanagh was born in Dublin, Ireland and moved to Western Australia when he was four. He took up playing hockey in primary school and attended Nagle Catholic College in Geraldton.

== Field hockey ==
Kavanagh represents Western Australia in national competitions. In 2010, he was a member of the Western Australian state team that competed in the Australian Hockey League. In a June 2010 game against the South Australian Southern Hotshots, he scored a goal. He played in a June 2010 game for Western Australia against the NT Stingers that Western Australia won 4–1. He scored a goal in the game. He played for the team in the first found of the 2011 season.

Kavanagh is a member of the Australia men's national field hockey team. In January 2008, he was a member of the senior national team that competed at the Five Nations men's hockey tournament in South Africa. He represented Australia at the 2008 Summer Olympics, playing in the Australia's 6–1 victory over Canada. His team won a bronze medal at the 2008 Games. New national team coach Ric Charlesworth named him, a returning member, alongside fourteen total new players who had few than 10 national team caps to the squad before in April 2009 in a bid to ready the team for the 2010 Commonwealth Games. In 2009, he was a member of the national team during a five-game test series in Kuala Lumpur, Malaysia against Malaysia. He was a member of the 2009 Hockey Champions Trophy winning team, playing in the gold medal match against Germany that Australia won by a score of 5–3. In 2010, he represented Australia at the Commonwealth Games, and played in the game against Pakistan during the group stage. He was the Kookaburras captain during the Games. The Pakistan match was his 100th international cap for Australia. Australia won a gold medal at the 2010 Commonwealth Games. In May 2011, he played in the Azlan Shah Cup for Australia. The Cup featured teams from Pakistan, Malaysia, India, South Korea, Britain and New Zealand. In December 2011, he was named as one of twenty-eight players to be on the 2012 Summer Olympics Australian men's national training squad. This squad was narrowed in June 2012. He trained with the team from 18 January to mid-March in Perth, Western Australia. In February during the training camp, he played in a four nations test series with the teams being the Kookaburras, Australia A Squad, the Netherlands and Argentina.

He was named on the Australian Olympic team, which proceeded to win the bronze medal again.

=== Coaching ===
In October 2010, Kavanagh ran a hockey clinic in Hobart, Tasmania.
