= Baljit Singh (field hockey, born 1986) =

Malaysian field hockey player (born 1986)

Personal information
- Full name: Baljit Singh s/o Charun Singh
- Born: 22 September 1986 (age 39) Ipoh, Perak, Malaysia
- Height: 1.77 m (5 ft 9 1/2 in)

Sport
- Sport: Field hockey
- Position: Defender
Senior career
Years	Team	Caps	Goals
2004–2008	Tenaga Nasional Berhad HC	-	-
2008	Zehlendorfer Wespen	-	-
2008–2011	Tenaga Nasional Berhad HC	-	-
2012–	UniKL HC	-	-
2015	Club Hockey Complutense	-	-
National team
Years	Team	Caps	Goals
2007–	Malaysia	189+	-
Medal record
Men's field hockey
Representing Malaysia
Asian Games
Silver medal – second place	2010 Guangzhou	Team
Asia Cup
Bronze medal – third place	2007 Chennai	Team
SEA Games
Gold medal – first place	2013 Naypyidaw	Team
Sultan Azlan Shah Cup
Silver medal – second place	2013 Ipoh	Team

Baljit Singh s/o Charun Singh (Punjabi: ਬਲਜੀਤ ਸਿੰਘ, romanized: Baljīt Singh; born 22 September 1986) is a field hockey player from Ipoh, Perak, Malaysia.

Baljit joined TNB in 2004 and helped them to three overall titles in the MHL, in 2004, 2007 and 2009. He made his senior international debut at the 2007 Sultan Azlan Shah Cup.

In 2008 Baljit played for Zehlendorfer Wespen in the German league with another Malaysian, Selvaraju Sandrakasi. The German Division Two club gave him an invitation again in 2009 and 2010 but he was unable to accept it because of commitments with the national team.
