= Jaap Stockmann =

Dutch field hockey player

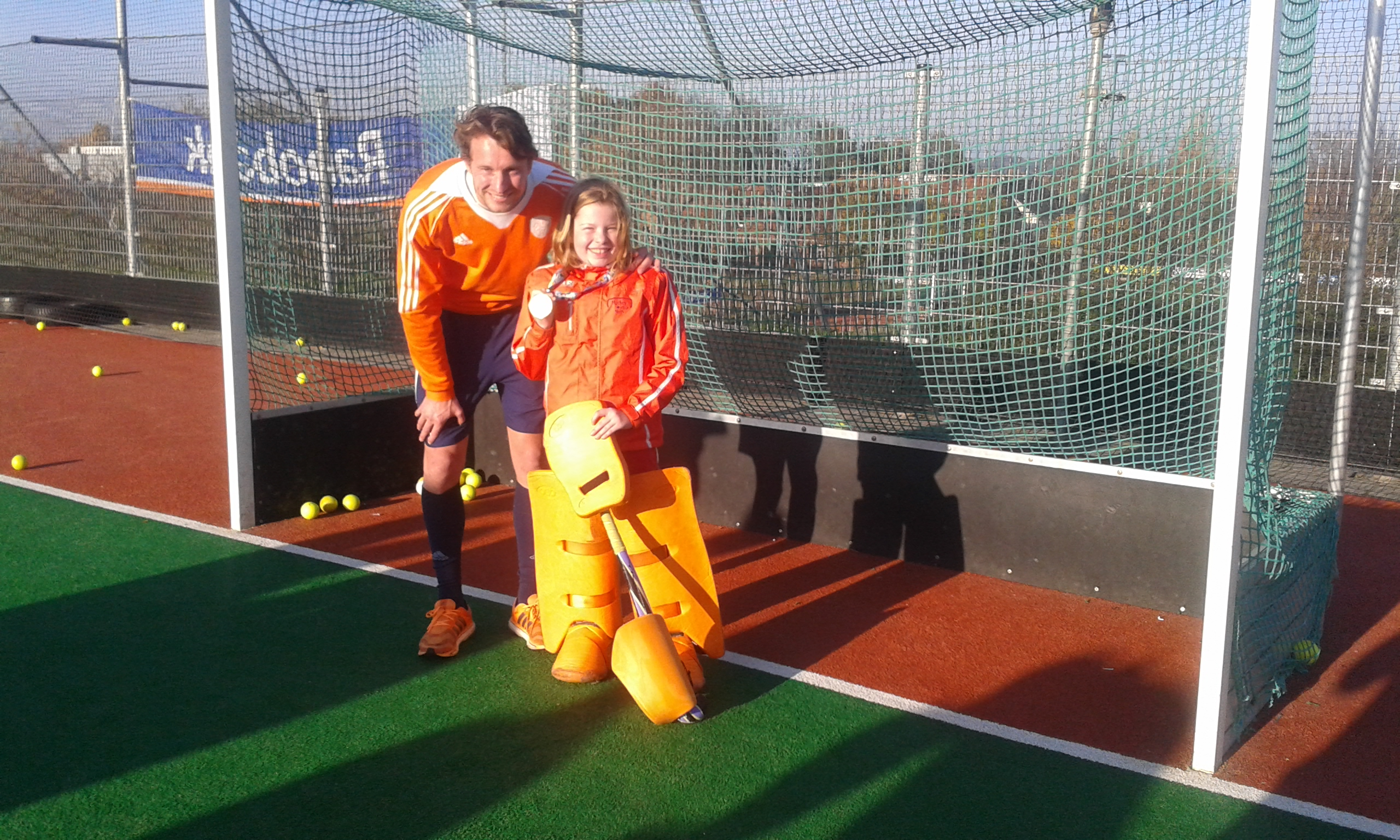

Personal information
- Full name: Jacob Stockmann
- Born: 24 July 1984 (age 42) Bunnik, Netherlands

Sport
- Sport: Field hockey
- Position: Goalkeeper
Youth career
- Team
- –: Kampong
Senior career
Years	Team	Caps	Goals
–	Kampong	-	-
–2004	Hurley	-	-
2004–2018	Bloemendaal	-	-
2013–2014	→ Punjab Warriors	-	-
National team
Years	Team	Caps	Goals
2007–2016	Netherlands	140	(0)
Medal record
Men's field hockey
Representing Netherlands
Olympic Games
Silver medal – second place	2012 London	Team
World Cup
Silver medal – second place	2014 The Hague
Bronze medal – third place	2010 New Delhi
EuroHockey Championship
Gold medal – first place	2015 London
Silver medal – second place	2011 Gladbach
Bronze medal – third place	2009 Amstelveen
Bronze medal – third place	2013 Boom
Champions Trophy
Silver medal – second place	2012 Melbourne
Bronze medal – third place	2007 Kuala Lumpur
Bronze medal – third place	2010 Mönchengladbach
Bronze medal – third place	2011 Auckland
World League
Gold medal – first place	2012–13 New Delhi	Team

Jacob "Jaap" Stockmann (born 24 July 1984) is a retired Dutch field hockey player, who played as a goalkeeper for the Dutch national team. Stockmann was announced FIH Best Goalkeeper of the World in 2014.

In 2008 he was the reserve goalkeeper in the Dutch team that came in fourth at the Olympic Games in Beijing. At the 2012 Summer Olympics and 2016 Summer Olympics, he was the starting goalkeeper. Stockmann won the silver medal in 2012. Stockmann has played for HC Bloemendaal in the Dutch League (Hoofdklasse). With HC Bloemendaal, he won the Euro Hockey League in the 2008–09, 2012–13 and 2017–18 seasons. He also played for the Punjab Warriors in the Hockey India League, and won the player of the tournament for the 2014 edition.

== Honours ==
=== Club ===
Bloemendaal

- Dutch national title: 2005–06, 2006–07, 2007–08, 2008–09, 2009–10
- Euro Hockey League: 2008–09, 2012–13, 2017–18

=== International ===
Netherlands

- EuroHockey Championships: 2015
- World League: 2012–13

=== Individual ===
- FIH Goalkeeper of the Year: 2014
- Hockey India League MVP: 2014

New title	FIH Goalkeeper of the Year; 2014	Succeeded by David Harte
