= Stephen Lambert (field hockey) =

Australian field hockey player

Personal information
- Born: 21 December 1979 (age 46)
Medal record
Men's field hockey
Olympic Games
Bronze medal – third place	2008 Beijing	Team
World Cup
Silver medal – second place	2006 Mönchengladbach	Team
Champions Trophy
Gold medal – first place	2005 Chennai	Team
Gold medal – first place	2008 Rotterdam	Team
Silver medal – second place	2003 Amstelveen	Team
Silver medal – second place	2007 Kuala Lumpur	Team
Commonwealth Games
Commonwealth Games
Gold medal – first place	2002 Manchester	Team
Gold medal – first place	2006 Melbourne	Team

Stephen Lambert (born 21 December 1979) is a field hockey goalkeeper from Australia, who was first selected to play for The Kookaburras at the Four Nations International Challenge in June 2002. Lambert, nicknamed 'Lambo, lambot and Rexy throughout his professional career, claimed a Commonwealth Games gold medal in Manchester (2002). Stephen is married to Hockeyroos player Angie Skirving as of December 2006.

== International tournaments ==
- 2002 – Commonwealth Games, Manchester (1st)
- 2003 – Champions Trophy, Amstelveen (2nd)
- 2005 – Champions Trophy, Chennai (1st)
- 2006 – Commonwealth Games, Melbourne (1st)
