= Bevan George =

Australian field hockey player

Personal information
- Nationality: Australian
- Born: Bevan Christopher George; 22 March 1977 (age 49) Narrogin, Western Australia

Sport
- Country: Australia
- Sport: Field hockey
- Event: Men's team
Medal record
Men's field hockey
Representing Australia
Olympic Games
Gold medal – first place	2004 Athens	Team
Bronze medal – third place	2008 Beijing	Team
World Cup
Silver medal – second place	2002 Kuala Lumpur	Team
Silver medal – second place	2006 Mönchengladbach	Team
Champions Trophy
Gold medal – first place	2005 Chennai	Team
Gold medal – first place	2008 Rotterdam	Team
Silver medal – second place	2001 Rotterdam	Team
Silver medal – second place	2003 Amstelveen	Team
Silver medal – second place	2007 Kuala Lumpur	Team
Commonwealth Games
Gold medal – first place	2002 Manchester	Team
Gold medal – first place	2006 Melbourne	Team

Bevan Christopher George OAM (born 22 March 1977 in Narrogin, Western Australia) is a field hockey defender from Australia.

== Field hockey ==
=== National team ===
George won a gold medal with the Australia national field hockey team (The Kookaburras) at the 2004 Summer Olympics in Athens, and captained The Kookaburras at the 2008 Summer Olympics, where they won a bronze medal. George retired from international competition after the Beijing Games, having played 208 games for Australia. In the 2005 Australia Day Honours George was awarded the Medal of the Order of Australia (OAM).

He was also part of the Australian Junior Team that won the golden medal at the Junior World Cup in Milton Keynes, 1997. George, nicknamed Jethro, played his 100th match for The Kookaburras on 23 May 2004 against Belgium during the European Tour. He was the captain of the team that won the Champions Trophy in December 2005 in Chennai, where he was named Player of the Tournament, as well as captain.

He is a fullback.

In 1999, he had a scholarship with and played for the Australian Institute of Sport team.

He competed in the 2007 Champions Trophy competition for Australia.

After winning a medal at the 2008 Summer Olympics, he retired from the sport.

In December 2011, he was named as one of fourteen players to be on the 2012 Summer Olympics Australian men's national Olympic development squad. While this squad is not in the top twenty-eight and separate from the Olympic training coach, the Australian coach Ric Charlesworth did not rule out selecting from only the training squad, with players from the Olympic development having a chance at possibly being called up to represent Australia at the Olympics. He trained with the team from 18 January to mid-March in Perth, Western Australia.

== International tournaments ==
- 2000 - Champions Trophy, Amstelveen (5th place)
- 2001 - Champions Trophy, Rotterdam (2nd place)
- 2002 - World Cup, Kuala Lumpur (2nd place)
- 2002 - Commonwealth Games, Manchester (1st place)
- 2002 - Champions Trophy, Cologne (5th place)
- 2003 - Champions Trophy, Amstelveen (2nd place)
- 2004 - Olympic Games, Athens (1st place)
- 2005 - Champions Trophy, Chennai (1st place)
- 2006 - Commonwealth Games, Melbourne (1st place)
- 2006 - Champions Trophy, Terrassa (4th place)
- 2006 - World Cup, Mönchengladbach (2nd place)
- 2007 - Champions Trophy, Kuala Lumpur (2nd place)
- 2008 - Olympic Games, Beijing (3rd place)
