= Selvaraju Sandrakasi =

Personal information
- Full name: Selvaraju Sandrakasi
- Nickname: Raju
- Born: 21 July 1985 (age 41) Taiping, Perak, Malaysia

Sport
- Sport: Field hockey
- Position: Forward, Midfielder
Senior career
Years	Team	Caps	Goals
200?–2006	Tenaga Nasional Berhad HC	-	-
2006	Mönchengladbach	12	5
2007–2008	Tenaga Nasional Berhad HC	-	-
2008	Berliner HC	10	7
2009	Tenaga Nasional Berhad HC	-	-
2009	Midlands	8	4
2010	Racing Club de France	12	4
2011–	UniKL HC	-	-
National team
Years	Team	Caps	Goals
2006–	Malaysia	100	(108)
Medal record
Men's Hockey Asia Cup
Bronze medal – third place	2007 Chennai	Team

Selvaraju Sandarakasi (born 21 July 1985) is a Malaysian Field hockey coach and former international player. He was born in Taiping, Perak, Malaysia, and developed an interest in hockey from a young age.

He attended Bukit Jalil Sports School. Through Malaysia's development pathway, he progressed through junior competitions and national age-group programmes, earning recognition as one of the country's most talented player.

His performances at junior level led to opportunities with leading Malaysian clubs and eventually selection to the Malaysian national team. He later represented Malaysia in major international competitions, including the 2014 Commonwealth Games, Asian Cup, Sultan Azlan Shah Cup 2010 and 2007 Men's Hockey Champions Trophy

== Playing career ==
=== National Junior Squad ===
Selvaraju Sandrakasi played for Malaysia's National Junior Hockey Team. He was recognised as the "Most Skillful Player", "Top Scorer" and "Best Player" of the tournament in the Malaysian U-19 Junior League.

=== National Squad ===
Selvaraju Sandrakasi represented Malaysia for more than a decade. He competed in major tournaments including the 2014 Commonwealth Games, 2007 Men's Hockey Champions Trophy, 2007 Men's Hockey Asia Cup, Sultan Azlan Shah Cup, .

=== National Leagues ===
Selvaraju Sandrakasi started his club hockey career with Sapura Hockey Club in 2000. He later joined Tenaga Nasional Berhad Hockey Club in 2003, where he continued to develop as a player and recognized as "Men of the match" in 2004 Malaysia Men's Hockey League. In 2009, he joined Unikl Hockey Club and played for the team for many years.

=== International Leagues ===
Selvaraju Sandrakasi played in many international leagues. He first played in Germany in 2006 and scored five goals in 12 Division One matches for Moenchengladbach. In 2008, he played for Berlin and scored seven goals in 10 matches. He was supposed to return to Berlin to continue playing for the Berliner HC in April but injury sidelined him. He earned another call-up from Berlin for 2010 German League.

In October 2009, Selvaraju had a stint in New Zealand for Division One side Midlands. He scored four goals in eight matches. He also featured for Racing Club de France for two months from March 2010. He scored four goals in 12 French Division One matches. He received invitation to represent Air Force HC in Thailand, Singh Sabha HC in Hong Kong and Dandenong HC in Australia.

In 2015, Selvaraju played for Pistoia Hockey Club in Italy. His time in Italy contributed significantly as both a player and coach. Following his playing career, he later returned to Pistoia Hockey Club as head coach, where he was involved in player development and team performance programs.

== Coaching career ==
Selvaraju began as a assistance coach for Kuala Lumpur U-16 state tournament and Junior leagues U-19 in Malaysia. Over the years, he advanced to Head Coach position with teams including Razak Cup, 2010 Malaysia Junior Hockey League Unikl team. Among his notable achievements are leading Thailand leading the team to its first-ever Women's Indoor Asia Cup final appearance , winning a championship with DKI Jakarta Hockey. He also held Head coach position in Pistoia Hockey Club, Italy and Woodville Hockey Club, Australia.
