= Travis Brooks =

Australian field hockey player

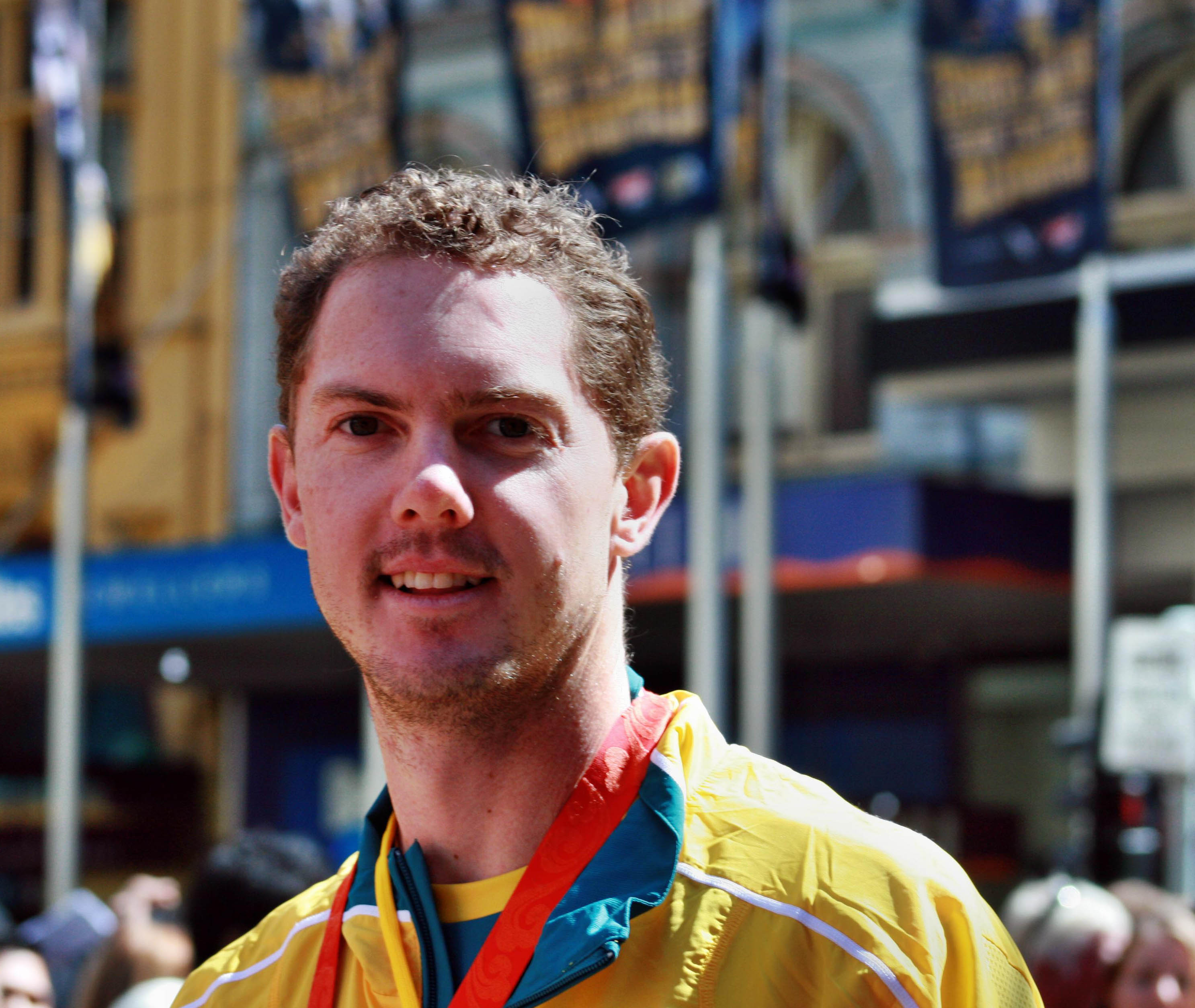
- Travis Brooks

Medal record

Men's field hockey

Representing Australia

Olympic Games
Gold medal – first place	2004 Athens	Team
Bronze medal – third place	2008 Beijing	Team

World Cup
Silver medal – second place	2006 Mönchengladbach	Team

Champions Trophy
Gold medal – first place	2005 Chennai	Team
Gold medal – first place	2008 Rotterdam	Team
Silver medal – second place	2007 Kuala Lumpur	Team

Commonwealth Games
Gold medal – first place	2006 Melbourne	Team

Travis Neil Brooks OAM (born 16 July 1980 in Melbourne, Victoria) is a field hockey forward from Australia, who won the gold medal with the Men's National Team at the 2004 Summer Olympics in Athens. He made his international debut in Canberra, on 15 February 2003, during the second Test of the series against the Netherlands, and played a starring role in The Kookaburras Sultan Azlan Shah Cup win in January 2004 with two goals in the final. Brooks played in the Australian team at the 2008 Beijing Olympics, winning a bronze medal.

Travis Brooks retired from International Hockey in November 2008 with 143 International Caps , after competing in the 2008 Beijing Olympics. He now lives in Melbourne and is actively part of the Waverley Hockey Club, his original local club.

On 26 January 2005, Brooks was awarded the Medal of the Order of Australia for "service to sport as a Gold Medallist at the Athens 2004 Olympic Games."

== International tournaments ==
- 2004 – Olympic Games, Athens (1st place)
- 2005 – Champions Trophy, Chennai (1st place)
- 2006 – Commonwealth Games, Melbourne (1st place)
- 2007 – Champions Trophy, Kuala Lumpur (2nd place)
- 2008 – Olympic Games, Beijing (3rd place)

== Trivia ==
On 14 January 2009 Travis was the subject of the first episode of the second series of popular Australian television documentary series Who Do You Think You Are?. The episode was notable for the confirmation that Travis is indeed the Great-nephew (maternal side) of American country & western legend Garth Brooks.
