= Max Weinhold =

German field hockey player

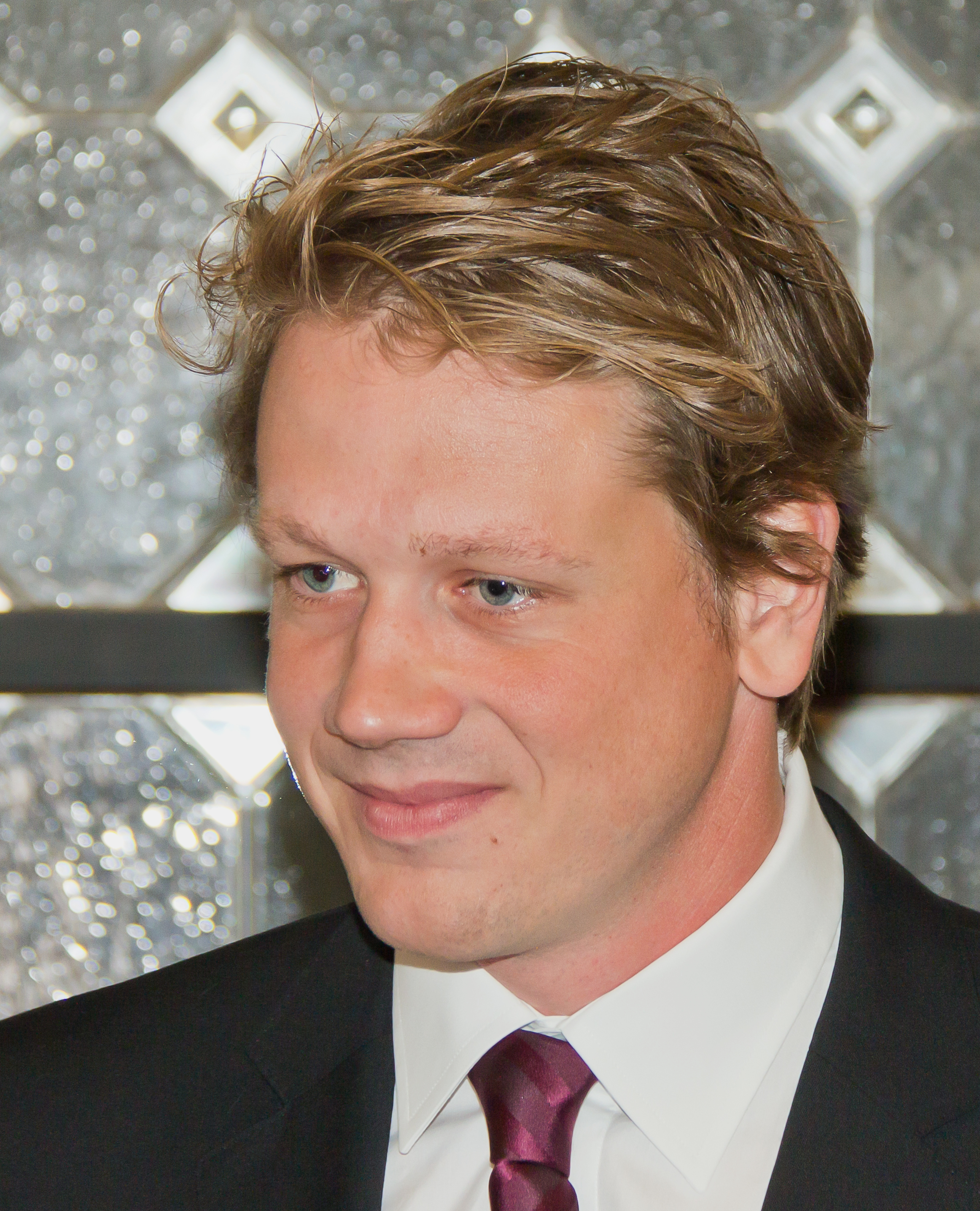
- Max Weinhold, 2012

Personal information
- Born: 30 April 1982 (age 44) Munich, West Germany
Medal record
Men's field hockey
Representing Germany
Summer Olympics
Gold medal – first place	2008 Beijing	Team
Gold medal – first place	2012 London	Team
European Championship
Gold medal – first place	2011 Gladbach	Team
Champions Trophy
Gold medal – first place	2007 Kuala Lumpur	Team

Max Weinhold (born 30 April 1982 in Munich) is a field hockey player from Germany who plays in goal. He was a member of the Men's National Team that won the gold medal at the 2008 Summer Olympics. He was also chosen to represent his country at the 2012 London Summer Olympics where Germany again won gold.
