= Laurence Docherty =

Dutch field hockey player

Personal information
- Full name: Laurence William Docherty
- Born: 24 February 1980 (age 46) Edinburgh, Scotland
- Height: 1.72 m (5 ft 8 in)
- Weight: 70 kg (154 lb)

Sport
- Sport: Field hockey
- Position: Midfielder
Senior career
Years	Team	Caps	Goals
2000–2007	Klein Zwitserland	-	-
2007–2011	Bloemendaal	-	-
2011–2014	Kampong	-	-
National team
Years	Team	Caps	Goals
–	Scotland		-
2006–2012	Netherlands	78	(9)
Medal record
Men's field hockey
Representing the Netherlands
EuroHockey Championship
Bronze medal – third place	2009 Amstelveen

Laurence William Docherty (born 24 February 1980) is a former field hockey player who played as a midfielder. Born in Scotland, he played for both the Scotland and the Netherlands national team.

== Club career ==
Docherty came to the Netherlands in 2000, and played club hockey for Klein Zwitserland until the 2007–08 season, when he moved to Bloemendaal. In 2011 he switched to Kampong.

== International career ==
Docherty represented Scotland at the 2003 Men's EuroHockey Nations Championship, after which he went public announcing he wanted to obtain Dutch citizenship. He obtained his Dutch citizenship in 2006. In 2007, Docherty missed out on playing the European Championship in Manchester, but was called into the Netherlands squad for the Champions Trophy in Malaysia in November 2007, thus boosting his prospects of playing in the Beijing Olympics, which he did.
