= Muhammad Kamran =

Pakistani politician

Member of the Provincial Assembly of Sindh
- In office 29 May 2013 – 28 May 2018

Personal details
- Born: 5 May 1974 (age 51) Karachi, Sindh, Pakistan
- Party: MQM-P (2023-present)
- Other political affiliations: PSP (2018-2023); MQM-L (2013-2018)

Muhammad Kamran is a Pakistani politician who had been a Member of the Provincial Assembly of Sindh, from May 2013 to May 2018.

== Early life ==
He was born on 5 May 1974 in Karachi.

== Political career ==
He was elected to the Provincial Assembly of Sindh as a candidate of MQM-L from Constituency PS-111 KARACHI-XXIII in the 2013 Pakistani general election.

In April 2018, he quit MQM-P and joined PSP.
