= Oliver Korn =

German field hockey player

Personal information
- Born: 10 June 1984 (age 42) Düsseldorf, West Germany
- Height: 181 cm (5 ft 11 in)
- Weight: 76 kg (168 lb)

Sport
- Sport: Field hockey
Medal record
Men's field hockey
Representing Germany
Olympic Games
Gold medal – first place	2008 Beijing	Team
Gold medal – first place	2012 London	Team
European Championship
Gold medal – first place	2011 Gladbach	Team
Champions Trophy
Gold medal – first place	2007 Kuala Lumpur	Team

Oliver Korn (born 10 June 1984, in Düsseldorf) is a field hockey player from Germany. He was a member of the Men's National Team that won the gold medal at the 2008 Summer Olympics and 2012 Summer Olympics.
