= Markus Weise =

German field hockey coach

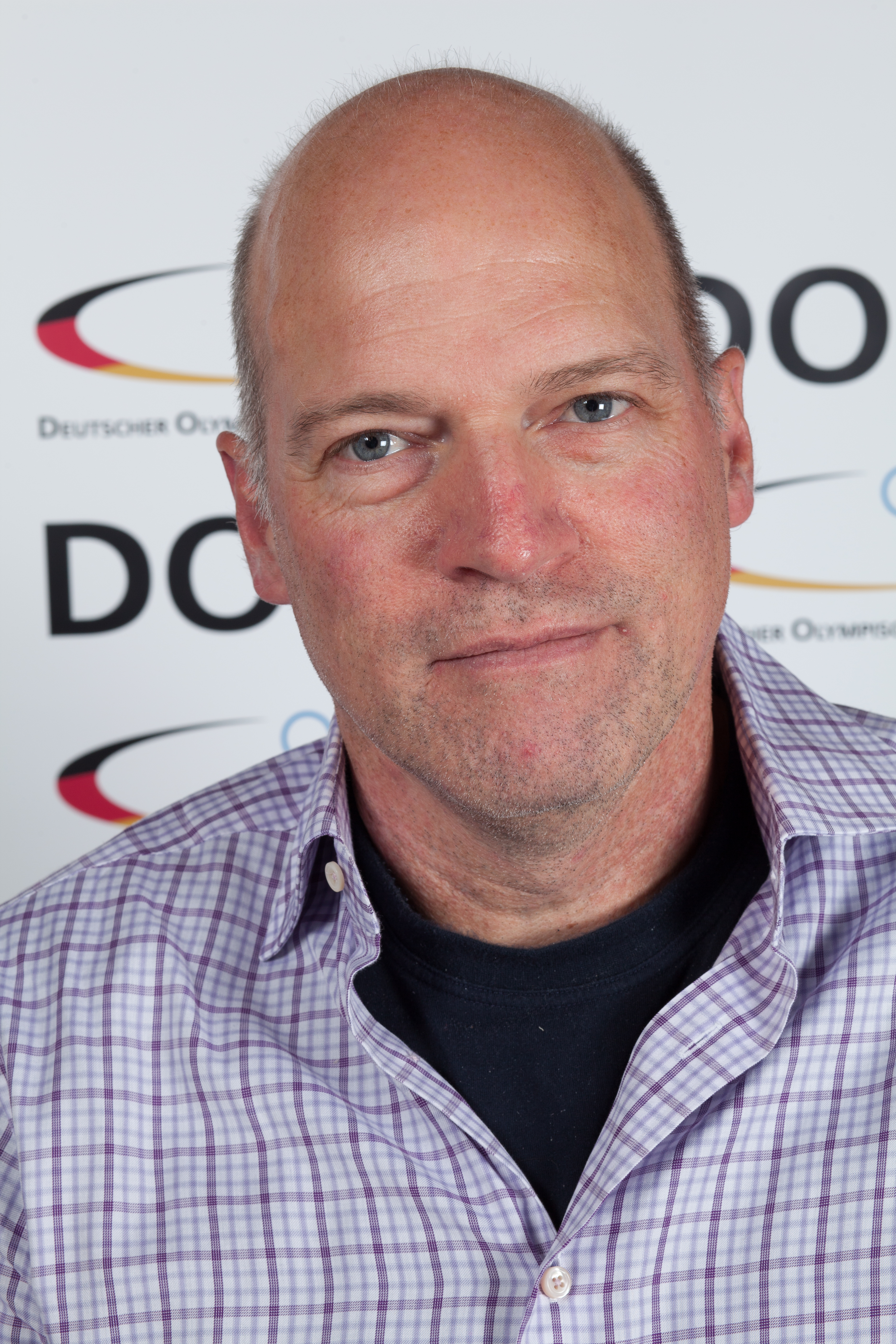
Markus Weise

Markus Weise (born 19 December 1962 in Mannheim) is a German field hockey coach. Since 6 November 2006, he has been Head Coach of the Germany national field hockey team. Previous to this role, he was the coach of the Germany women's national field hockey team and with a variety of (national) teams of the German National Hockey Federation, including being assistant coach to Bernhard Peters in the Gold medal success of the 2002 Men's Hockey World Cup in Malaysia.

As a club coach in the German Bundesliga (1st Division), he was the head coach for many years with TSV Mannheim.

His greatest success was winning the gold medal at the 2004 Summer Olympics in Athens with the Germany women's national field hockey team, thus becoming the first coach in the history of field hockey to win an olympic gold medal in both the Men's as well as the Women's competition. His German side defeated Spain 1–0 to win the 2008 Olympic Men's Hockey Final.

== Awards ==
- Sportsperson of the year(Germany)
  - 2004: As Coach of the Germany women's national field hockey team: Winner 2004 Olympic Tournament in Athens
  - 2008: As Coach of the Germany national field hockey team: Winner 2008 Olympic Tournament in Beijing
