= Matthew Daly =

English field hockey player

Matt Daly
Personal information
- Born: 8 July 1983 (age 43) Dammam, Saudi Arabia
- Height: 188 cm (6 ft 2 in)
- Weight: 84 kg (185 lb)

Sport
- Sport: Field hockey
- Position: Forward
Senior career
Years	Team	Caps	Goals
2002–2016	Surbiton	-	-
2016–2025	Teddington	-	-
National team
Years	Team	Caps	Goals
2005-2012	England & GB	152	(57)
Medal record
Representing England
European Championship
Gold medal – first place	2009 Amsterdam	Team
Bronze medal – third place	2011 Mönchengladbach	Team

Matthew Daly (born 8 July 1983) is an English field hockey player who played for England and Great Britain and competed at the 2008 Summer Olympics and 2012 Summer Olympics.

== Biography ==
Daly was born in Saudi Arabia. He played club hockey for Surbiton in the Men's England Hockey League from 2002 to 2016.

While at Surbtion, Daly made his international debut in 2005. He competed for at numerous tournaments, including representing England at the 2006 Commonwealth Games in Melbourne and playing for Great Britain in the 2008 men's tournament at the Olympic Games in Beijing.

Four years later he represented Great Britain at the 2012 Olympic Games in London in the 2012 field hockey tournament.

In 2016 he left Surbiton to join Teddington and became their Performance Director in 2020.

He is currently a senior member of staff and hockey coach at Kingston Grammar School.
