= Kim Byung-hoon (field hockey) =

South Korean field hockey player

Medal record

Men's field hockey

Representing South Korea

Asia Cup
Gold medal – first place	2009 Kuantan	
Silver medal – second place	2007 Chennai	

- Kim Byung-hoon
- Hangul: 김병훈
- RR: Gim Byeonghun
- MR: Kim Pyŏnghun

Kim Byung-hoon (born 22 October 1982) is a South Korean field hockey player who competed in the 2008 Summer Olympics.
