= Albert Sala =

Spanish field hockey player (born 1981)

Personal information
- Full name: Albert Sala Moreno
- Born: 15 July 1981 (age 45) Terrassa, Spain
- Height: 185 cm (6 ft 1 in)
- Weight: 79 kg (174 lb)

Sport
- Sport: Field hockey
Senior career
Years	Team	Caps	Goals
–	Atlètic Terrassa	-	-
–	SCHC	-	-
National team
Years	Team	Caps	Goals
–	Spain		-
Medal record
Men's field hockey
Representing Spain
Olympic Games
Silver medal – second place	2008 Beijing	Team
European Championship
Gold medal – first place	2005 Leipzig	Team
Silver medal – second place	2007 Manchester	Team
Champions Trophy
Gold medal – first place	2004 Lahore	Team
Bronze medal – third place	2005 Chennai	Team
Bronze medal – third place	2006 Terrassa	Team
Champions Challenge
Gold medal – first place	2003 Johannesburg	Team

Albert Sala Moreno (Note: In this Spanish name, the first or paternal surname is Sala and the second or maternal family name is Moreno.) (born 15 July 1981) is a field hockey player from Spain, who finished in fourth position with the Men's National Team at the 2004 Summer Olympics in Athens, Greece.

After having played for Atlètic Terrassa for several years, he moved to The Netherlands in the summer of 2006, and started to play for Stichtse Cricket en Hockey Club in Bilthoven.

Albert Sala Moreno graduated from the Johan Cruyff Institute in the International Master of Sport Management.
