= Ramón Alegre =

Spanish field hockey player (born 1981)

Personal information
- Full name: Ramón Alegre Biosca
- Born: 14 May 1981 (age 45) Barcelona, Spain

Sport
- Sport: Field hockey
- Position: Defender
Senior career
Years	Team	Caps	Goals
–2004	Club Egara	-	-
2004–2005	Laren	-	-
2005–2009	Club Egara	-	-
2009–2013	Kampong	-	-
National team
Years	Team	Caps	Goals
2002–2014	Spain	260	-
Medal record
Men's field hockey
Representing Spain
Olympic Games
Silver medal – second place	2008 Beijing	Team
European Championship
Gold medal – first place	2005 Leipzig	Team
Silver medal – second place	2007 Manchester	Team
Champions Trophy
Gold medal – first place	2004 Lahore	Team
Silver medal – second place	2011 Auckland	Team
Bronze medal – third place	2005 Chennai	Team
Bronze medal – third place	2006 Terrassa	Team
Champions Challenge
Gold medal – first place	2003 Johannesburg	Team

Ramón Alegre Biosca (born 14 May 1981 in Barcelona, Catalonia) is a field hockey defender from Spain. He finished in fourth position with the Men's National Team at the 2004 Summer Olympics in Athens, Greece.

After having played for Laren in The Netherlands, he moved back to Spain, joining his former club Club Egara in the summer of 2005. He claimed the silver medal with the national squad at the 2008 Summer Olympics. He also competed at the 2012 Summer Olympics. His brother David is also a field hockey international for Spain.
