= Kim Sam-seok =

South Korean field hockey player

- Hangul: 김삼석
- RR: Gim Samseok
- MR: Kim Samsŏk

Kim Sam-seok (born 9 December 1980) is a South Korean field hockey player who competed in the 2008 Summer Olympics.
