= Tibor Weißenborn =

German field hockey player (born 1981)

Personal information
- Born: 20 March 1981 (age 45) West Berlin
- Height: 175 cm (5 ft 9 in)
- Weight: 70 kg (154 lb)

Sport
- Sport: Field hockey
Medal record
Men's field hockey
Representing Germany
Olympic Games
Gold medal – first place	2008 Beijing	Team
Bronze medal – third place	2004 Athens	Team
European Championship
Gold medal – first place	1999 Padua	Team
Gold medal – first place	2003 Barcelona	Team
Bronze medal – third place	2005 Leipzig	Team
Champions Trophy
Gold medal – first place	2007 Kuala Lumpur	Team
Silver medal – second place	2000 Amstelveen	Team
Silver medal – second place	2002 Cologne	Team
Silver medal – second place	2006 Terrassa	Team

Tibor Weißenborn (born 20 March 1981 in West Berlin) is a field hockey player from Germany, who was a member of the Men's National Team that won the bronze medal at the 2004 Summer Olympics and the gold medal at the 2008 Summer Olympics He was also a member of both the teams that won the 10th World Cup in Malaysia in 2002, and 11th World Cup in Germany in 2006.

== International senior tournaments ==
- 1999 – European Nations Cup, Padua (1st place)
- 2000 – Champions Trophy, Amstelveen (2nd place)
- 2000 – Summer Olympics, Sydney (5th place)
- 2001 – European Indoor Nations Cup, Luzern (1st place)
- 2001 – Champions Trophy, Rotterdam (1st place)
- 2002 – 10th World Cup, Kuala Lumpur (1st place)
- 2002 – Champions Trophy, Cologne (2nd place)
- 2003 – European Indoor Nations Cup, Santander (1st place)
- 2003 – 1st World Indoor Cup, Leipzig (1st place)
- 2003 – European Nations Cup, Barcelona (1st place)
- 2004 – Summer Olympics, Athens (3rd place)
- 2005 – European Nations Cup, Leipzig (3rd place)
- 2005 – Champions Trophy, Chennai (4th place)
- 2006 – Champions Trophy, Terrassa (2nd place)
- 2006 – 11th World Cup, Mönchengladbach (1st place)
- 2007 – European Nations Cup, Manchester (4th place)
- 2007 – Champions Trophy, Kuala Lumpur (1st place)

Awards
Preceded by None	WorldHockey Young Player of the Year; 2001	Succeeded by (Australia) Jamie Dwyer
