= Florian Keller =

German field hockey player

Personal information
- Born: October 3, 1981 (age 44)
Medal record
Men's field hockey
Representing Germany
Olympic Games
Gold medal – first place	2008 Beijing	Team
Champions Trophy
Gold medal – first place	2001 Rotterdam	Team
Gold medal – first place	2007 Kuala Lumpur	Team
EuroHockey
Gold medal – first place	1999 Padua	Team

Florian Keller (born October 3, 1981 in Berlin) is a field hockey player from Germany and the brother of Natascha Keller. He was a member of the Men's National Team that won the gold medal at the 2008 Summer Olympics.
