= Matthijs Brouwer =

Dutch field hockey player

Personal information
- Full name: Matthijs Christian Brouwer
- Born: 1 July 1980 (age 46) Raamsdonk, Netherlands

Sport
- Sport: Field hockey
- Position: Forward
Senior career
Years	Team	Caps	Goals
–	DDHC	-	-
–	Push	-	-
–	Den Bosch	-	-
–	Oranje Zwart	-	-
National team
Years	Team	Caps	Goals
2000–2008	Netherlands	211	(68)
Medal record
Men's field hockey
Representing the Netherlands
Olympic Games
Silver medal – second place	2004 Athens	Team
World Cup
Bronze medal – third place	2002 Kuala Lumpur	Team
EuroHockey Championship
Gold medal – first place	2007 Manchester	Team
Silver medal – second place	2005 Leipzig	Team
Champions Trophy
Gold medal – first place	2000 Amstelveen	Team
Gold medal – first place	2002 Cologne	Team
Gold medal – first place	2003 Amstelveen	Team
Gold medal – first place	2006 Terrassa	Team
Silver medal – second place	2004 Lahore	Team
Silver medal – second place	2005 Chennai	Team
Bronze medal – third place	2007 Kuala Lumpur	Team

Matthijs Christian Brouwer (born 1 July 1980 in Raamsdonk, North Brabant) is a field hockey player from the Netherlands, who won the silver medal with the Dutch national team at the 2004 Summer Olympics in Athens. The striker made his debut on 2 June 2000 in a friendly match against Spain. He played for HC Den Bosch in the Dutch League (Hoofdklasse), but moved to Oranje Zwart in the summer of 2005. His cousin Ronald also is a member of the Netherlands hockey squad.
