= Sebastian Biederlack =

German field hockey player (born 1981)

Personal information
- Full name: Sebastian Friedrich Felix Biederlack
- Born: 16 September 1981 (age 44) Hamburg, West Germany
- Height: 176 cm (5 ft 9 in)
- Weight: 73 kg (161 lb)

Sport
- Sport: Field hockey
- Position: Midfielder
Senior career
| Years | Team | Caps | Goals |
| –2009 | Club an der Alster | - | - |
| 2009– | Club de Campo | - | - |
National team
| Years | Team | Caps | Goals |
| – | Germany | | - |
Medal record
Men's field hockey
Representing Germany
Olympic Games
| Gold medal – first place | 2008 Beijing | Team |
| Bronze medal – third place | 2004 Athens | Team |
World Cup
| Gold medal – first place | 2002 Kuala Lumpur | Team |
| Gold medal – first place | 2006 Mönchengladbach | Team |
European Championship
| Gold medal – first place | 2003 Barcelona | Team |
| Bronze medal – third place | 2005 Leipzig | Team |
Champions Trophy
| Gold medal – first place | 2007 Kuala Lumpur | Team |
| Silver medal – second place | 2002 Cologne | Team |
| Silver medal – second place | 2006 Terrassa | Team |

Sebastian Friedrich Felix Biederlack (born 16 September 1981 in Hamburg) is a field hockey player from Germany, who was a member of the Men's National Team that won the bronze medal at the 2004 Summer Olympics in Athens, Greece.

The midfielder who played for German club Club an der Alster and Spanish club Club de Campo made his international senior debut for the national team on 10 July 1999 in a friendly against South Korea in Leipzig. As of 12 December 2005, Biederlack earned 139 caps for his native country, in which he scored eleven goals.

He represented his native country at the 2008 Summer Olympics in Beijing, China.

== International senior tournaments ==
- 2001 – Champions Trophy, Rotterdam (1st place)
- 2002 – 10th World Cup, Kuala Lumpur (1st place)
- 2002 – Champions Trophy, Cologne (2nd place)
- 2003 – European Indoor Nations Cup, Santander (1st place)
- 2003 – Champions Trophy, Amstelveen (6th place)
- 2003 – European Nations Cup, Barcelona (1st place)
- 2004 – Summer Olympics, Athens (3rd place)
- 2005 – European Nations Cup, Leipzig (3rd place)
- 2005 – Champions Trophy, Chennai (4th place)
- 2006 – Champions Trophy, Terrassa (2nd place)
- 2006 – 11th World Cup, Mönchengladbach (1st place)
- 2007 – European Nations Cup, Manchester (4th place)
- 2007 – Champions Trophy, Kuala Lumpur (1st place)
