= Carlos Nevado =

German field hockey player

Personal information
- Full name: Juan Carlos Nevado González
- Born: 16 September 1982 (age 43) Frankfurt am Main, West Germany
Medal record
Men's field hockey
Representing Germany
Olympic Games
Gold medal – first place	2008 Beijing	Team
World Cup
Gold medal – first place	2006 Mönchengladbach	Team
European Championship
Bronze medal – third place	2005 Leipzig	Team
Champions Trophy
Gold medal – first place	2007 Kuala Lumpur	Team
Silver medal – second place	2006 Terrassa	Team

Juan Carlos Nevado González (born 16 November 1982 in Frankfurt am Main) is a German field hockey player of Uruguayan and Spanish descent. He was a member of the Men's National Teams that won the gold medal at the 2008 Summer Olympics and at the 2006 World Cup.

As of 2008 Nevado played for Hamburg's Uhlenhorster Hockey Club.

In July 2016, he was part of the PwC Germany team who stole a 3 - 1 victory from PwC Manchester despite being out classed for the entire game. In another game against PwC Reading, Reading went 1 - 0 up. This is considered by many critics as the most memorable game on tour.
