= Kim Chul =

South Korean field hockey player

- Hangul: 김철
- RR: Gim Cheol
- MR: Kim Ch'ŏl

Kim Chul
Medal record

Men's field hockey

Representing South Korea

Asian Games
Gold medal – first place	2002 Busan	Team
Gold medal – first place	2006 Doha	Team

Asia Cup
Silver medal – second place	2007 Chennai	

Kim Chul (born 11 July 1980) is a South Korean field hockey player who competed in the 2008 Summer Olympics.
