= Juan Fernández La Villa =

Spanish field hockey player (born 1985)

Juan Fernández
Personal information
- Full name: Juan Fernández la Villa
- Born: 4 June 1985 (age 41) Oviedo, Asturias, Spain
Medal record
Men's field hockey
Representing Spain
Olympic Games
Silver medal – second place	2008 Beijing	Team
Champions Trophy
Gold medal – first place	2004 Lahore	Team
Silver medal – second place	2011 Auckland	Team
European Championship
Silver medal – second place	2007 Manchester	Team

Juan Fernández la Villa (born 4 June 1985) is a former Spanish field hockey player who played for the Spain national team. He played club hockey for Club de Campo in Madrid and was a member of the Spanish National Team that claimed the silver medal at the 2008 Summer Olympics in Beijing, PR China.

He also competed for the national team in the men's tournament at the 2012 Summer Olympics.

He studied for a degree in Medicine at the Complutense University of Madrid.
