= Benjamin Weß =

German field hockey player (born 1985)

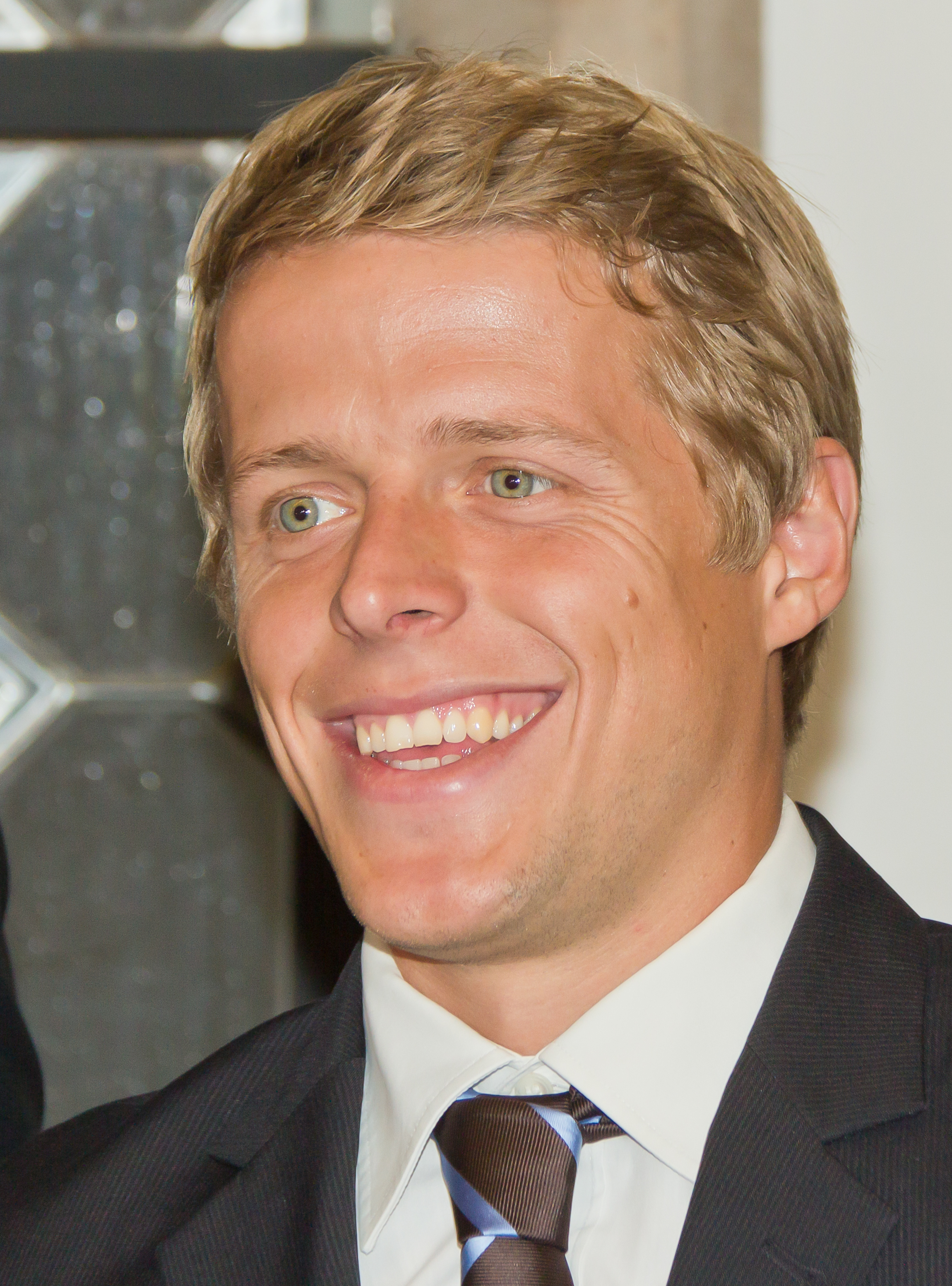
- Wess in 2012

Personal information
- Born: 28 July 1985 (age 40)
Medal record
Men's field hockey
Representing Germany
Olympic Games
| Gold medal – first place | 2008 Beijing | Team |
| Gold medal – first place | 2012 London | Team |
European Championship
| Gold medal – first place | 2011 Gladbach | Team |

Benjamin Weß (also spelled Wess; born 28 July 1985 in Moers) is a field hockey player from Germany and the younger brother of Timo Weß. He was a member of the Men's National Team that won the gold medal at the 2008 Summer Olympics and the 2012 Summer Olympics.
