= Ronald Brouwer =

Dutch field hockey player

Ronald Brouwer OLY
Personal information
- Full name: Ronald Leendert Brouwer
- Born: 27 April 1979 (age 47) Hellevoetsluis, Netherlands

Sport
- Sport: Field hockey
- Position: Forward
Youth career
- Team
- –: Hercules
- –: Den Dunc
- –: Zutphen
- –: Deventer
Senior career
Years	Team	Caps	Goals
1994–1996	Deventer	-	-
1996–1998	Wageningen	-	-
1998–2006	HGC	-	-
2006–2014	Bloemendaal	-	-
2014–2015	Almere	-	-
2015–2018	Braxgata	-	-
2018–2021	Schaerweijde	-	-
National team
Years	Team	Caps	Goals
2001–2010	Netherlands	220	(80)
Medal record
Men's field hockey
Representing the Netherlands
Olympic Games
Silver medal – second place	2004 Athens	Team
World Cup
Bronze medal – third place	2002 Kuala Lumpur
Bronze medal – third place	2010 New Delhi
EuroHockey Championship
Gold medal – first place	2007 Manchester
Silver medal – second place	2005 Leipzig
Champions Trophy
Gold medal – first place	2002 Cologne
Gold medal – first place	2003 Amstelveen
Gold medal – first place	2006 Terrassa
Silver medal – second place	2004 Lahore
Silver medal – second place	2005 Chennai
Bronze medal – third place	2007 Kuala Lumpur

Ronald Leendert Brouwer (born 24 April 1979) is a Dutch former field hockey player who played as a forward.

He won the silver medal with the Dutch national team at the 2004 Summer Olympics in Athens. He is the cousin of Matthijs Brouwer. He played a total of 220 games for the Dutch national team in which he scored 80 goals.

== Club career ==
He played for HGC and HC Bloemendaal in the Dutch highest division. Bloemendaal was his last club in the Dutch highest league where he played until 2014. After that he played one year for Dutch second division club Almere before he went to Belgium to play three years for Braxgata HC. In 2018 he lengthened his career again by signing for Dutch second division club ZSV Schaerweijde. He retired from top-level hockey in 2021.
