= Kang Seong-jung =

South Korean field hockey player

- Hangul: 강성정
- Hanja: 姜聲丁
- RR: Gang Seongjeong
- MR: Kang Sŏngjŏng

Kang Seong-jung
Medal record

Men's field hockey

Representing South Korea

Asian Games
Gold medal – first place	2002 Busan	Team
Gold medal – first place	2006 Doha	Team

Asia Cup
Silver medal – second place	2007 Chennai	

Kang Seong-jung (Korean: 강성정; born 21 October 1977) is a South Korean field hockey player who competed in the 2004 Summer Olympics and in the 2008 Summer Olympics.
