= Xavier Ribas =

Spanish field hockey player (born 1976)

Personal information
- Born: 16 February 1976 (age 50)
Medal record
Men's field hockey
Representing Spain
Olympic Games
Silver medal – second place	2008 Beijing	Team
World Cup
Silver medal – second place	1998 Utrecht	Team
European Championship
Gold medal – first place	2005 Leipzig	Team
Silver medal – second place	2007 Manchester	Team
Champions Trophy
Bronze medal – third place	2005 Chennai	Team
Bronze medal – third place	2006 Terrassa	Team
Champions Challenge
Gold medal – first place	2003 Johannesburg	Team

Xavier Ribas Centelles (born 16 February 1976) is a field hockey defender from Spain. He represented the Men's National Team at three consecutive Summer Olympics, starting in 2000.
