= Rob Moore (field hockey) =

British field hockey player (born 1981)

Personal information
- Born: 21 May 1981 (age 45) Winchester, England
- Height: 184 cm (6 ft 0 in)
- Weight: 83 kg (183 lb)

Sport
- Sport: Field hockey
- Position: midfielder/forward
Senior career
Years	Team	Caps	Goals
1998–1999	Havant	-	-
1999–2004	Teddington	-	-
2004–2010	Surbiton	-	-
2010–2011	Wimbledon	-	-
2012	Surbiton	-	-
2015–2016	Fareham	-	-
National team
Years	Team	Caps	Goals
–	England & GB	190	-
Medal record
Men's field hockey
Representing England
Champions Trophy
Silver medal – second place	2010 Mönchengladbach	Team
European Championship
Gold medal – first place	2009 Amsterdam	Team
Bronze medal – third place	2011 Mönchengladbach	Team

Robert Stephen Moore (born 21 May 1981) is an English former field hockey player. He appeared at three Olympic Games in 2004, 2008 and 2012.

== Biography ==
Moore was born in Winchester, England and was educated at King Edward VI, Southampton before studying economics at University of Nottingham. Throughout his academic career Moore was involved with all sports, showing a particular talent for hockey and cricket. At the age of 16 whilst playing a hockey match for his school, the coach for the opposing team, who happened to also be the under 21s coach for England, spotted the young player's natural ability and invited him to an England under 21s trial.

Moore made the England under 21s team the summer of the trials in 1998, and that August was selected for his first tournament; the Under 21s European Cup in Poznan, Poland where the team also managed to pick up a silver medal. In February 2003 aged 21, Moore made his senior international debut.

Moore played club hockey for Havant but signed for Teddington in 1999 and while at the club made his Olympic debut with Great Britain at the 2004 Olympic Games in Athens. He left Teddington for Surbiton for the 2004/05 season and represented England at the 2006 Commonwealth Games in Melbourne and represented Great Britain at the 2008 Olympic Games in Beijing.

Moore was a key part of the team that won the gold medal at the 2009 European Cup 2009 and silver medal at the 2010 Champions Trophy. After switching from to Surbiton to Wimbledon he played in the 2010 Commonwealth Games in Delhi and was part of the silver medal winning England team that competed at the 2010 Men's Hockey Champions Trophy in Mönchengladbach, Germany.

Moore played his first indoor capped tournament in Poznan, Poland on 8 February 2011. Moore joined Wimbledon for the 2010/11 season and was selected by England for the 2010 Commonwealth Games.

Moore represented Great Britain at the Olympics for the third time at the 2012 Olympic Games in London.

Moore signed for National League side Fareham Hockey Club for the start of the 2015-16 season.

== Personal life ==
Moore and his wife Camilla have six children. He is currently a teacher of Biology and Master in charge of golf at Winchester College.
