= Matthias Witthaus =

German field hockey player (born 1982)

Personal information
- Born: 11 October 1982 (age 43) Oberhausen, West Germany

Sport
- Sport: Field hockey
- Position: Forward
Senior career
Years	Team	Caps	Goals
–	Uhlenhorst Mülheim	-	-
–	Atlètic Terrassa	-	-
–	Crefeld	-	-
2008–2009	Atlètic Terrassa	-	-
2009–2010	Real Club de Polo	-	-
–	Mannheim	-	-
–	Hamburger Polo Club	-	-
National team
Years	Team	Caps	Goals
1999–2012	Germany	335	-
Medal record
Representing Germany
Men's field hockey
Olympic Games
Gold medal – first place	2008 Beijing	Team
Gold medal – first place	2012 London	Team
Bronze medal – third place	2004 Athens	Team
World Cup
Gold medal – first place	2002 Kuala Lumpur	Team
Gold medal – first place	2006 Mönchengladbach	Team
Silver medal – second place	2010 New Delhi	Team
EuroHockey Championship
Gold medal – first place	2011 Gladbach	Team
Champions Trophy
Gold medal – first place	2001 Rotterdam	Team
Gold medal – first place	2007 Kuala Lumpur	Team
Silver medal – second place	2000 Amstelveen	Team
Silver medal – second place	2002 Cologne	Team
Silver medal – second place	2006 Terrassa	Team
Men's indoor field hockey
Indoor World Cup
Gold medal – first place	2003 Leipzig	Team
Gold medal – first place	2011 Poznan	Team

Matthias Witthaus (born 11 October 1982 in Oberhausen) is a field hockey player from Germany, who was a member of the Men's National Team that won the bronze medal at the 2004 Summer Olympics in Athens, Greece and the gold medal at the 2008 Summer Olympics in Beijing and again at the 2012 Summer Olympics. He played a total of 335 caps for the national team from 1999 until 2012, with 335 caps he is the most capped German player of all time.

== International senior tournaments ==
- 1999 – European Nations Cup, Padua (1st place)
- 2000 – Champions Trophy, Amstelveen (2nd place)
- 2000 – Summer Olympics, Sydney (5th place)
- 2001 – European Indoor Nations Cup, Luzern(1st place)
- 2001 – Champions Trophy, Rotterdam (1st place)
- 2002 – 10th World Cup, Kuala Lumpur (1st place)
- 2002 – Champions Trophy, Cologne (2nd place)
- 2003 – European Indoor Nations Cup, Santander (1st place)
- 2003 – 1st World Indoor Cup, Leipzig (1st place)
- 2003 – European Nations Cup, Barcelona (1st place)
- 2004 – Summer Olympics, Athens (3rd place)
- 2005 – European Nations Cup, Leipzig (3rd place)
- 2005 – Champions Trophy, Chennai (4th place)
- 2006 – Champions Trophy, Terrassa (2nd place)
- 2006 – 11th World Cup, Mönchengladbach (1st place)
- 2007 – European Nations Cup, Manchester (4th place)
- 2007 – Champions Trophy, Kuala Lumpur (1st place)
- 2008 – Summer Olympics, Beijing (1st place)
- 2012 – Summer Olympics, London (1st place)
