= Eduard Arbós =

Spanish field hockey player (born 1983)

Personal information
- Born: May 7, 1983 (age 43) Terrassa, Catalunya
Medal record
Men's field hockey
Representing Spain
Olympic Games
Silver medal – second place	2008 Beijing	Team
Champions Trophy
Gold medal – first place	2004 Lahore	Team
European Championship
Silver medal – second place	2007 Manchester	Team

Eduard Arbós Borras (born 7 May 1983) is a Spanish field hockey player. He is affiliated with Club Egara. He was a member of the Spanish National Team that claimed the silver medal at the 2008 Summer Olympics in Beijing, PR China.
