= Philipp Zeller =

German field hockey player

Personal information
- Born: 23 March 1983 (age 43) Munich, West Germany
Medal record
Men's field hockey
Representing Germany
Olympic Games
Gold medal – first place	2008 Beijing	Team
Gold medal – first place	2012 London	Team
World Cup
Gold medal – first place	2006 Mönchengladbach	Team
Champions Trophy
Silver medal – second place	2006 Terrassa	Team
EuroHockey
Gold medal – first place	2003 Barcelona	Team
Gold medal – first place	2011 Gladbach	Team

Philipp Zeller (born March 23, 1983, in Munich) is a German field hockey player from Germany and the older brother of Christopher Zeller. He was a member of the Men's National Teams that won the gold medal at the 2008 Summer Olympics, 2012 Summer Olympics and at the 2006 World Cup. As of 2008, his current club is Rot-Weiss Köln.
