= Víctor Sojo =

Spanish field hockey player (born 1983)

Personal information
- Born: 24 November 1983 (age 42)
Medal record
Men's field hockey
Representing Spain
Olympic Games
Silver medal – second place	2008 Beijing	Team
European Championship
Gold medal – first place	2005 Leipzig	Team
Silver medal – second place	2007 Manchester	Team
Champions Trophy
Gold medal – first place	2004 Lahore	Team
Bronze medal – third place	2005 Chennai	Team
Bronze medal – third place	2006 Terrassa	Team

Víctor Manuel Sojo Jiménez (born 24 November 1983 in Puente Genil, Córdoba) is a field hockey striker from Spain. He finished in fourth position with the Men's National Team at the 2004 Summer Olympics in Athens, Greece, and won the silver medal four years later in Beijing.
