= Philip Witte =

German field hockey player

Personal information
- Born: 29 July 1984 (age 42) Hamburg, Germany
- Height: 1.80 m (5 ft 11 in)
- Weight: 80 kg (176 lb)

Sport
- Sport: Field hockey
- Position: Forward
Senior career
Years	Team	Caps	Goals
–	UHC Hamburg	-	-
National team
Years	Team	Caps	Goals
2005–2010	Germany	113	(19)
Medal record
Men's field hockey
Representing Germany
Olympic Games
Gold medal – first place	2008 Beijing	Team
World Cup
Silver medal – second place	2010 New Delhi
Champions Trophy
Gold medal – first place	2007 Kuala Lumpur
Silver medal – second place	2006 Terrassa
Silver medal – second place	2009 Melbourne
EuroHockey Junior Championship
Silver medal – second place	2004 Nivelles

Philip Witte (born 29 July 1984) is a field hockey player from Germany. He was a member of the Men's National Team that won the gold medal at the 2008 Summer Olympics.
