= Eduard Tubau =

Spanish field hockey player (born 1981)

Personal information
- Full name: Eduard Tubau Cutal
- Born: 6 January 1981 (age 45) Terrassa, Spain
- Height: 180 cm (5 ft 11 in)
- Weight: 77 kg (170 lb)

Sport
- Sport: Field hockey
- Position: Forward
Senior career
Years	Team	Caps	Goals
1996–2009	Club Egara	-	-
2009–2012	Club de Campo	-	-
2012–2016	Club Egara	-	-
National team
Years	Team	Caps	Goals
1999–2015	Spain	273	-
Medal record
Men's field hockey
Representing Spain
Olympic Games
Silver medal – second place	2008 Beijing	Team
World Cup
Bronze medal – third place	2006 Mönchengladbach	Team
EuroHockey Championships
Gold medal – first place	2005 Leipzig	Team
Silver medal – second place	2007 Manchester	Team
Champions Trophy
Silver medal – second place	2011 Auckland	Team
Bronze medal – third place	2005 Chennai	Team
Bronze medal – third place	2006 Terrassa	Team
Champions Challenge
Gold medal – first place	2003 Johannesburg	Team

Eduard "Eddie" Tubau Cutal (Note: In this Spanish name, the first or paternal surname is Tubau and the second or maternal family name is Cutal.) (born 6 January 1981) is a Spanish professional field hockey player. He plays as a striker. He represented the Spanish men's national team at four consecutive Olympics, starting in 2000, including the team that won the silver medal at the 2008 Olympics. He played club hockey for Club de Campo and Club Egara.
