= Timo Wess =

German field hockey player (born 1982)

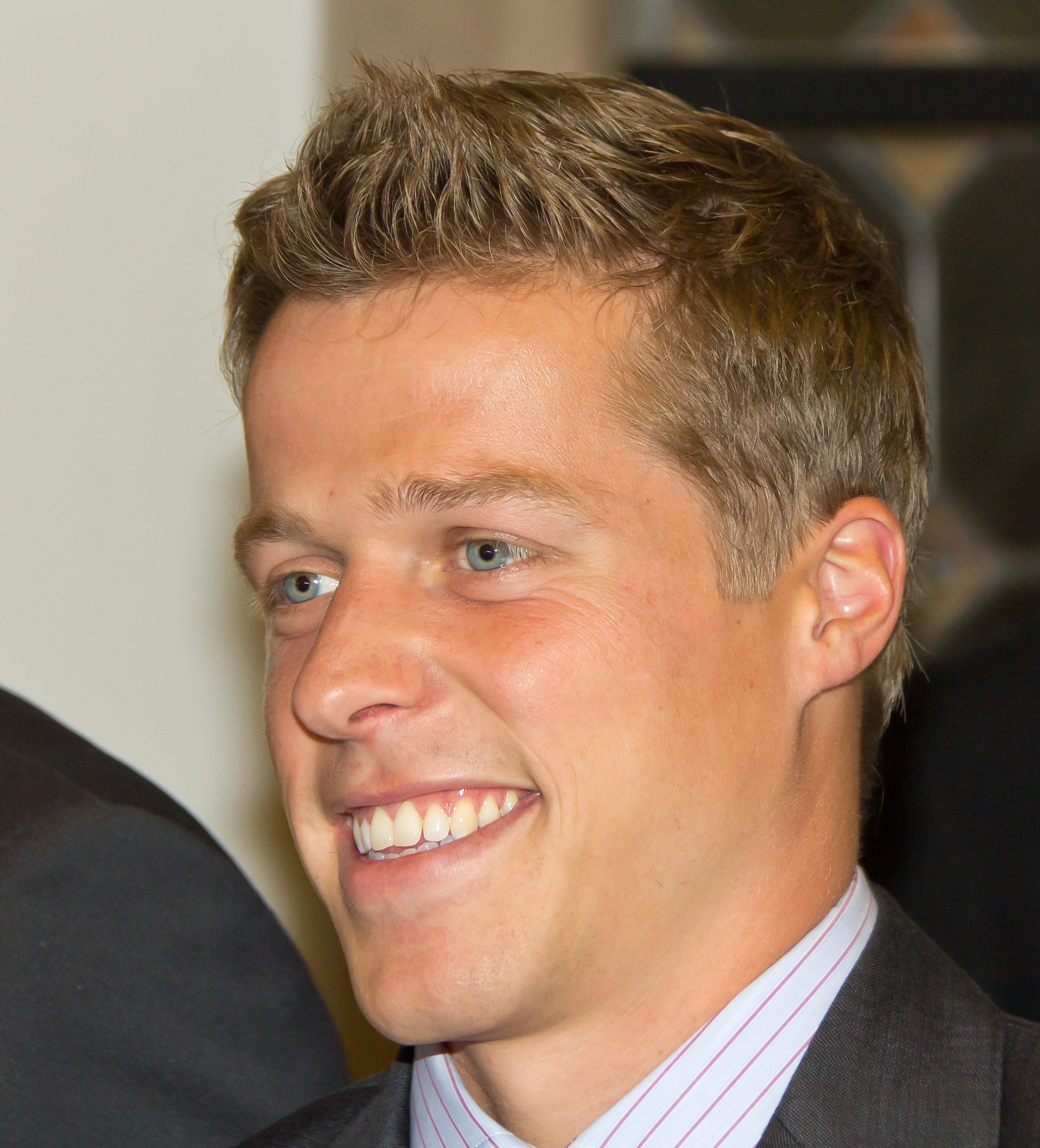
- Timo Wess, 2012

Personal information
- Born: 2 July 1982 (age 44) Moers, West Germany

Sport
- Sport: Field hockey
- Position: Defender
Youth career
- Years: Team
- 1988–1995: Moerser SC
- 1995–2000: Uhlenhorst Mülheim
Senior career
Years	Team	Caps	Goals
2000–2003	Uhlenhorst Mülheim	-	-
2003–2004	Crefelder HTC	-	-
2004–2005	Uhlenhorst Mülheim	-	-
2005–2007	Crefelder HTC	-	-
2007–2012	Rot-Weiss Köln	-	-
National team
Years	Team	Caps	Goals
2001–2012	Germany	252	-
Medal record
Representing Germany
Men's field hockey
Olympic Games
Gold medal – first place	2008 Beijing	Team
Gold medal – first place	2012 London	Team
Bronze medal – third place	2004 Athens	Team
World Cup
Gold medal – first place	2002 Kuala Lumpur	Team
Gold medal – first place	2006 Mönchengladbach	Team
EuroHockey Championship
Gold medal – first place	2003 Barcelona	Team
Bronze medal – third place	2005 Leipzig	Team
Champions Trophy
Gold medal – first place	2007 Kuala Lumpur	Team
Silver medal – second place	2002 Cologne	Team
Silver medal – second place	2006 Terrassa	Team
Men's indoor field hockey
Indoor World Cup
Gold medal – first place	2007 Vienna	Team

Timo Wess (born 2 July 1982) is a field hockey player from Germany, who was a member of the men's national team that won the bronze medal at the 2004 Summer Olympics in Athens, Greece, and gold at the 2008 and 2012 Summer Olympics. He was born in Moers, North Rhine-Westphalia.

The defender, who played for German club Crefelder HTC, made his international senior debut for the national team on February 26, 2001 in a friendly against India in Mumbai. As of December 18, 2005, Wess earned 137 caps for his native country, in which he scored 13 goals. Previously he played for HTC Uhlenhorst Mülheim. Since the Athens Olympics he was the captain of the Men's National Team. At the end of his international career, he had earned 252 caps.

== International senior tournaments ==
- 2002 – 10th World Cup, Kuala Lumpur (1st place)
- 2002 – Champions Trophy, Cologne (2nd place)
- 2003 – European Nations Cup, Barcelona (1st place)
- 2004 – Summer Olympics, Athens (3rd place)
- 2005 – European Nations Cup, Leipzig (3rd place)
- 2005 – Champions Trophy, Chennai (4th place)
- 2006 – Champions Trophy, Terrassa (2nd place)
- 2006 – 11th World Cup, Mönchengladbach (1st place)
- 2007 – European Nations Cup, Manchester (4th place)
- 2007 – Champions Trophy, Kuala Lumpur (1st place)
- 2008 – Summer Olympics, Beijing (1st place)
- 2012 – Summer Olympics, London (1st place)
