= Pakistan national field hockey team tours and matches (2005–2009) =

- Season: 2005–2009

This page lists all the tours and matches played by Pakistan national field hockey team from 2005 to 2009. During this period Pakistan won the 2005 Hockey RaboTrophy their first high-profile tournament won since 1994. Pakistan also won a silver medal at the 2006 Commonwealth Games.

== List of tours ==
Year	Host(s)	Competition	GP	W	D	L	GF	GA	Result	Position	Head coach
2005	Malaysia	2005 Sultan Azlan Shah Cup	7	4	1	2	16	10	Pool stage	3rd	(Pakistan) Tahir Zaman
2005	Germany	2005 Hamburg Masters	3	0	0	3	9	13	Pool stage	4th	(Pakistan) Asif Bajwa
2005	Netherlands	2005 Hockey RaboTrophy	4	3	1	0	12	4	Champions	1st	(Pakistan) Asif Bajwa
2005	India	2005 Hockey Champions Trophy	6	1	2	3	16	21	Pool stage	5th	(Pakistan) Asif Bajwa
2006	India, Pakistan	Internationals	6	3	2	1	12	9	–	–	(Pakistan) Asif Bajwa
2006	Australia	2006 Commonwealth Games	6	4	1	1	20	12	Runner-up	2nd	(Pakistan) Asif Bajwa
2006	China	2006 Intercontinental Cup	7	3	2	2	12	12	Semifinal	4th	(Pakistan) Asif Bajwa
2006	Malaysia	2006 Sultan Azlan Shah Cup	4	2	1	1	10	8	Pool stage	5th	(Pakistan) Asif Bajwa
2006	Spain	2006 Hockey Champions Trophy	6	2	1	3	14	20	Pool stage	5th	(Pakistan) Asif Bajwa
2006	Germany	2006 Hamburg Masters	3	1	0	2	8	13	Pool stage	3rd	(Pakistan) Nasir Ali
2006	Germany	2006 Hockey World Cup	7	2	2	3	13	13	Pool stage	6th	(Pakistan) Nasir Ali
2006	Qatar	2006 Asian Games	6	3	2	1	25	6	Semifinal	3rd	(Pakistan) Shahnaz Sheikh
2007	Malaysia	2007 Sultan Azlan Shah Cup	5	2	1	2	10	12	Pool stage	6th	(Pakistan) Islahuddin Siddique
2007	Russia	Four Nation Tournament	4	3	1	0	17	4	Champions	1st	(Pakistan) Islahuddin Siddique
2007	China	Good Luck Beijing Hockey International	4	1	3	0	9	6	Pool stage	3rd	(Pakistan) Islahuddin Siddique
2007	India	2007 Hockey Asia Cup	6	3	1	2	30	10	Pool stage	6th	(Pakistan) Islahuddin Siddique
2007	Malaysia	2007 Hockey Champions Trophy	8	2	2	4	15	20	Pool stage	7th	(Pakistan) Manzoor-ul Hassan
2008	China	Internationals	5	3	0	2	12	9	–	–	
2008	Malaysia	2008 Sultan Azlan Shah Cup	7	3	1	3	19	18	Pool stage	4th	
2008	Ireland	2008 Men's Hockey Setanta Sports Trophy	4	2	2	0	12	9	Champions	1st	
2008	China	2008 Summer Olympics	6	2	0	4	13	17	Pool stage	8th	
2008	Germany	2008 Men's Hockey Hamburg Masters	3	1	1	1	9	11	Pool stage	3rd	
2009	Malaysia	2009 Sultan Azlan Shah Cup	5	1	0	4	10	10	Pool stage	4th	
2009	Malaysia	2009 Men's Hockey Asia Cup	4	2	1	1	8	6	Runner-up	2nd	
2009	England	Internationals	3	2	1	0	6	4	–	–	
2009	France	2009 Men's Hockey World Cup Qualifiers	6	5	0	1	25	7	Champions	1st	
2009	Argentina	2009 Men's Hockey Champions Challenge I	5	3	0	2	15	12	Runner-up	2nd	

== Results ==
=== 2005 ===
==== 2005 Sultan Azlan Shah Cup ====
26 May 2005
Pool stage

Pakistan	2 – 1	New Zealand
Zakir 15'; Warsi 33'	Report	Brooks 22'

Kuala Lumpur, Malaysia

Stadium: Malaysia National Hockey Stadium

28 May 2005
Pool stage

South Korea	2 – 3	Pakistan
Kang 14'; Jang J. 44'	Report	Imran 2'; Abbasi 15'; Ali 30'

Kuala Lumpur, Malaysia

Stadium: Malaysia National Hockey Stadium

29 May 2005
Pool stage

Pakistan	2 – 0	South Africa
Abbasi 24'; Butt 30'	Report

Kuala Lumpur, Malaysia

Stadium: Malaysia National Hockey Stadium

31 May 2005
Pool stage

Australia	2 – 2	Pakistan
Doerner 29'; Livermore 64'	Report	Abbasi 3'; Imran 43'

Kuala Lumpur, Malaysia

Stadium: Malaysia National Hockey Stadium

1 June 2005
Pool stage

India	2 – 3	Pakistan
Deepak 39'; Sandeep 53'	Report	Zakir 8'; Butt 11'; Ali 29'

Kuala Lumpur, Malaysia

Stadium: Malaysia National Hockey Stadium

3 June 2005
Pool stage

Pakistan	0 – 1	Malaysia
	Report	Kuhan 40'

Kuala Lumpur, Malaysia

Stadium: Malaysia National Hockey Stadium

5 June 2005
Third and fourth place

Pakistan	4 – 2	New Zealand
Butt 10', 67'; Zakir 17'; Mudassar 62'	Report	Couzins 21'; Petherick 27'

Kuala Lumpur, Malaysia

Stadium: Malaysia National Hockey Stadium

==== 2005 Hamburg Masters ====
12 August 2005
Match 1

Germany	3 – 1	Pakistan
Zeller 16', 67', 70'	Report	Maqsood 48'

Hamburg, Germany

Stadium: Uhlenhorster HC

13 August 2005
Match 2

Netherlands	6 – 5	Pakistan
Reckers 18'; R. Brouwer 19', 61'; Weusthof 23'; De Nooijer 34'; Klaver 38'	Report	Butt 40', 41', 66'; Mehmud 47', 50'

Hamburg, Germany

Stadium: Uhlenhorster HC

14 August 2005
Match 3

Australia	4 – 3	Pakistan
Livermore 6'; Dwyer 8'; Schubert 37', 51'	Report	Imran 40', 53'; Abbasi 45'

Hamburg, Germany

Stadium: Uhlenhorster HC

==== 2005 Hockey RaboTrophy ====
16 August 2005
Pool stage

Spain	0 – 0	Pakistan
	Report

Amstelveen, Netherlands

Stadium: Wagener Stadium

18 August 2005
Pool stage

Pakistan	3 – 1	India
Saqlain 15'; Imran 30'; Abbasi 68'	Report	Didar 56'

Amstelveen, Netherlands

Stadium: Wagener Stadium

19 August 2005
Pool stage

Germany	0 – 5	Pakistan
	Report	Khan 17'; Butt 46', 66'; Shabbir 51'; Saqlain 57'

Amstelveen, Netherlands

Stadium: Wagener Stadium

21 August 2005
Final

Pakistan	4 – 3	Australia
Warsi 18'; Zakir 32'; Butt 42'; Mudassar 50'	Report	Brooks 8'; Schubert 24'; Bishop 34'

Amstelveen, Netherlands

Stadium: Wagener Stadium

==== 2005 Hockey Champions Trophy ====
10 December 2005
Pool stage

Netherlands	4 – 1	Pakistan
M. Brouwer 5'; De Nooijer 13'; R. Brouwer 44'; Reckers 61'	Report	Mudassar 54'

Chennai, India

Stadium: Mayor Radhakrishnan Stadium

11 December 2005
Pool stage

Pakistan	2 – 3	India
Imran 54'; Aziz 57'	Report	Khandker 60'; Sandeep 61', 68'

Chennai, India

Stadium: Mayor Radhakrishnan Stadium

13 December 2005
Pool stage

Pakistan	4 – 4	Germany
Imran 7'; Abbasi 28'; Butt 34'; Saqlain 67'	Report	C. Zeller 30', 60'; Nevado 30'; Montag 46'

Chennai, India

Stadium: Mayor Radhakrishnan Stadium

14 December 2005
Pool stage

Pakistan	2 – 4	Spain
Mudassar 54'; Saqlain 68'	Report	Amat 5', 42'; D. Alegre 23'; Ribas 45'

Chennai, India

Stadium: Mayor Radhakrishnan Stadium

16 December 2005
Pool stage

Pakistan	3 – 3	Australia
Imran 34'; Butt 39'; Mudassar 60'	Report	Doerner 31'; Naylor 55'; Wells 57'

Chennai, India

Stadium: Mayor Radhakrishnan Stadium

18 December 2005
Fifth and sixth place

India	3 – 4	Pakistan
Kanwalpreet 2'; Prabhjot 14'; Gagan Ajit 64'	Report	Imran 33'; Ali 38'; Saqlain 48'; Butt 62'

Chennai, India

Stadium: Mayor Radhakrishnan Stadium

=== 2006 ===
==== 2006 Series – India ====
17 February 2006
Test match

India	1 – 2	Pakistan
Khandekar 62'	Report	Aziz 15'; Abbasi 56'

Chandigarh, India

Stadium: Sector 42 Hockey Stadium

18 February 2006
Test match

India	1 – 3	Pakistan
Sandeep 44'	Report	Butt 41', 68'; Aziz 59'

Chandigarh, India

Stadium: Sector 42 Hockey Stadium

20 February 2006
Test match

India	1 – 2	Pakistan
Tajbir 26'	Report	Aziz 16'; Saqlain 30'

Jalandhar, India

Stadium: Surjit Singh Hockey Stadium

22 February 2006
Test match

Pakistan	1 – 1	India
Imran 16'	Report	Tajbir 65'

Lahore, Pakistan

Stadium: National Hockey Stadium

24 February 2006
Test match

Pakistan	1 – 2	India
Warsi 28'	Report	Rajpal 53'; Kanwalpreet 56'

Faisalabad, Pakistan

Stadium: Faisalabad Hockey Stadium

26 February 2006
Test match

Pakistan	3 – 3	India
Aziz 4'; Saqlain 11'; S. Khan 44'	Report	Sandeep 54'; Tajbir 60'; Pillay 67'

Rawalpindi, Pakistan

Stadium: Army Hockey Stadium

==== 2006 Commonwealth Games ====
18 March 2006
Pool stage

Pakistan	4 – 1	India
Mudassar 24'; Aziz 42'; Maqsood 50', 58'	Report	Tajbir 14'

Melbourne, Australia

Stadium: Melbourne Sports Centre

19 March 2006
Pool stage

Pakistan	1 – 1	South Africa
Imran 64'	Report	Basson 53'

Melbourne, Australia

Stadium: Melbourne Sports Centre

21 March 2006
Pool stage

Trinidad and Tobago	1 – 7	Pakistan
Dwain 26'	Report	Butt 5', 28', 51'; Shabbir 12'; Imran 22'; Zubair 26'; Abbasi 33'

Melbourne, Australia

Stadium: Melbourne Sports Centre

22 March 2006
Pool stage

Pakistan	6 – 5	Malaysia
Abbasi 13'; Shabbir 21'; Imran 30', 32'; Butt 44', 61'	Report	Huat 26'; Shanmuganathan 25', 34', 48'

Melbourne, Australia

Stadium: Melbourne Sports Centre

24 March 2006
Semifinal

Pakistan	2 – 1 (a.e.t.)	England
Abbasi 54', 73'	Report	Daly 68'

Melbourne, Australia

Stadium: Melbourne Sports Centre

26 March 2006
Final

Australia	3 – 0	Pakistan
Young 18'; Doerner 58'; Dwyer 62'	Report

Melbourne, Australia

Stadium: Melbourne Sports Centre

==== 2006 Intercontinental Cup ====
12 April 2006
Pool stage

Pakistan	1 – 0	Canada
Abbasi 17'	Report

Changzhou, China

Stadium: Wu Jin Sports Complex

13 April 2006
Pool stage

Pakistan	2 – 2	Belgium
Zakir 50'; Saqlain 59'	Report	Brulé 62'; Truyens 70'

Changzhou, China

Stadium: Wu Jin Sports Complex

15 April 2006
Pool stage

Egypt	1 – 2	Pakistan
Mohamed 32'	Report	Mudassar 45'; Warsi 60'

Changzhou, China

Stadium: Wu Jin Sports Complex

17 April 2006
Pool stage

England	2 – 3	Pakistan
R. Mantell 20'; S. Mantell 50'	Report	Mudassar 24'; Butt 26'; Saqlain 60'

Changzhou, China

Stadium: Wu Jin Sports Complex

19 April 2006
Pool stage

Pakistan	2 – 2	Ireland
Hussain 10'; Butt 42'	Report	Butler 21', 32'

Changzhou, China

Stadium: Wu Jin Sports Complex

22 April 2006
Semifinal

South Korea	2 – 1	Pakistan
Hong Eun-seong 47'; Lee Nam-yong 50'	Report	Imran 58'

Changzhou, China

Stadium: Wu Jin Sports Complex

23 April 2006
Third and fourth place

England	3 – 1	Pakistan
Tindall 34'; S. Mantell 47'; R. Mantell 65'	Report	Mudassar 49'

Changzhou, China

Stadium: Wu Jin Sports Complex

==== 2006 Sultan Azlan Shah Cup ====
19 June 2006
Pool stage

Netherlands	2 – 3	Pakistan
Evers 14'; Weusthof 70'	Report	Butt 5'; Warsi 20'; Abbasi 24'

Kuala Lumpur, Malaysia

Stadium: Malaysia National Hockey Stadium

20 June 2006
Pool stage

Pakistan	3 – 3	New Zealand
Imran 10'; Saqlain 30'; Warsi 69'	Report	Shaw 6'; McAleese 40'; Collier 60'

Kuala Lumpur, Malaysia

Stadium: Malaysia National Hockey Stadium

22 June 2006
Pool stage

Pakistan	0 – 2	Argentina
	Report	Saladino 47', 48'

Kuala Lumpur, Malaysia

Stadium: Malaysia National Hockey Stadium

24 June 2006
Fifth and sixth place

South Korea	1 – 4	Pakistan
Kang 42'	Report	Abbasi 15'; Saqlain 23'; Ali 46'; Waqas 64'

Kuala Lumpur, Malaysia

Stadium: Malaysia National Hockey Stadium

==== 2006 Hockey Champions Trophy ====
22 July 2006
Pool stage

Australia	3 – 2	Pakistan
McCann 2'; Elder 41', 56'	Report	Abbas 32', 53'

Terrassa, Spain

Stadium: Atlètic Terrassa Hockey Club

23 July 2006
Pool stage

Pakistan	3 – 3	Germany
Abbas 27', 38'; Abbasi 57'	Report	Zeller 2', 22'; Witthaus 68'

Terrassa, Spain

Stadium: Atlètic Terrassa Hockey Club

25 July 2006
Pool stage

Netherlands	9 – 2	Pakistan
M. Brouwer 1'; Evers 14'; Reckers 26'; R. Brouwer 30', 44', 65', 70'; De Nooijer 42'; Taekema 58'	Report	Abbasi 43'; Zakir 53'

Terrassa, Spain

Stadium: Atlètic Terrassa Hockey Club

27 July 2006
Pool stage

Pakistan	2 – 3	Spain
Ali 29'; Abbas 68'	Report	Freixa 10', 60'; Enrique 70'

Terrassa, Spain

Stadium: Atlètic Terrassa Hockey Club

29 July 2006
Pool stage

Pakistan	2 – 1	Argentina
Butt 6'; Abbasi 29'	Report	M. Cammareri 69'

Terrassa, Spain

Stadium: Atlètic Terrassa Hockey Club

30 July 2006
Pool stage

Pakistan	3 – 1	Argentina
Butt 24', 34'; Abbas 40'	Report	Almada 51'

Terrassa, Spain

Stadium: Atlètic Terrassa Hockey Club

==== 2006 Hamburg Masters ====
25 August 2006
Match 1

Germany	1 – 2	Pakistan
C. Zeller 35'	Report	Abbas 7'; Ahmed 39'

Hamburg, Germany

Stadium: Uhlenhorster HC

26 August 2006
Match 2

Netherlands	6 – 4	Pakistan
Reckers 16', 17'; Hofman 47', 68'; Delmee 56'; M. Brouwer 63'	Report	Abbas 27', 62', 69'; Butt 52'

Hamburg, Germany

Stadium: Uhlenhorster HC

27 August 2006
Match 3

Spain	6 – 2	Pakistan
Tubau 35', 66', 68'; Freixa 41', 44'; Amat 60'	Report	Akbar 7'; Abbasi 18'

Hamburg, Germany

Stadium: Uhlenhorster HC

==== 2006 Hockey World Cup ====
7 September 2006
Pool stage

Pakistan	4 – 0	Japan
Abbas 9', 64'; Butt 12'; Abbasi 68'	Report

Mönchengladbach, Germany

Stadium: Warsteiner HockeyPark

8 September 2006
Pool stage

New Zealand	4 – 4	Pakistan
Couzins 14', 36'; Hopping 18'; Shaw 53'	Report	Abbasi 9'; Zubair 21', 65'; Butt 42'

Mönchengladbach, Germany

Stadium: Warsteiner HockeyPark

10 September 2006
Pool stage

Pakistan	2 – 2	Spain
Butt 10'; Abbas 52'	Report	Freixa 27'; Amat 41'

Mönchengladbach, Germany

Stadium: Warsteiner HockeyPark

11 September 2006
Pool stage

Argentina	1 – 0	Pakistan
M. Vila 41'	Report

Mönchengladbach, Germany

Stadium: Warsteiner HockeyPark

13 September 2006
Pool stage

Australia	3 – 0	Pakistan
George 14', 51'; Dwyer 32'	Report

Mönchengladbach, Germany

Stadium: Warsteiner HockeyPark

15 September 2006
Crossover

Netherlands	2 – 3	Pakistan
Reckers 42'; Taekema 47'	Report	Abbasi 10'; Abbas 33'; Zubair 36'

Mönchengladbach, Germany

Stadium: Warsteiner HockeyPark

16 September 2006
Fifth and sixth place

England	1 – 0	Pakistan
Jones 67'	Report

Mönchengladbach, Germany

Stadium: Warsteiner HockeyPark

==== 2006 Asian Games ====
4 December 2006
Pool stage

Pakistan	1 – 1	Malaysia
Zubair 69'	Report	Kuhan 52'

Doha, Qatar

Stadium: Al-Rayaan Stadium

6 December 2006
Pool stage

Pakistan	10 – 1	Hong Kong
Aziz 4'; Zubair 7', 9'; Waqas 8', 26'; Imran 25', 50', 67'; Abbasi 27'; Warsi 34'	Report	Ar. Ali 31'

Doha, Qatar

Stadium: Al-Rayaan Stadium

9 December 2006
Pool stage

Chinese Taipei	0 – 9	Pakistan
	Report	Imran 20', 23', 58'; Maqsood 28', 47'; Abbasi 30', 67'; Zubair 42'; Aziz 61'

Doha, Qatar

Stadium: Al-Rayaan Stadium

10 December 2006
Pool stage

Pakistan	0 – 0	Japan
	Report

Doha, Qatar

Stadium: Al-Rayaan Stadium

12 December 2006
Semifinal

Pakistan	1 – 2 (a.e.t.)	China
Butt 20'	Report	Yu Yang 39'; Lu Fenghui 79'

Doha, Qatar

Stadium: Al-Rayaan Stadium

14 December 2006
Third and fourth place

Pakistan	4 – 2	Japan
Maqsood 11'; Abbasi 32'; Waqas 41', 53'	Report	Yamabori 9', 57'

Doha, Qatar

Stadium: Al-Rayaan Stadium

=== 2007 ===
==== 2007Sultan Azlan Shah Cup ====
5 May 2007
Pool stage

Pakistan	2 – 2	Malaysia
Ihsanullah 13'; Warsi 42'	Report	Zulkifli 6'; Ismail 29'

Ipoh, Malaysia

Stadium: Azlan Shah Stadium

8 May 2007
Pool stage

Pakistan	2 – 0	Canada
Shabbir 4'; Ali 33'	Report

Ipoh, Malaysia

Stadium: Azlan Shah Stadium

9 May 2007
Pool stage

South Korea	4 – 2	Pakistan
Kang M. 9'; Jeong 24', 47'; Hong 61'	Report	Aziz 4'; Imran 13'

Ipoh, Malaysia

Stadium: Azlan Shah Stadium

10 May 2007
Crossover

Pakistan	2 – 2 (a.e.t.)	China
Imran 10', 29'	Report	Yi 54'; Xian Tang 63'
Penalties
	3 - 1

Ipoh, Malaysia

Stadium: Azlan Shah Stadium

12 May 2007

Argentina	4 – 2	Pakistan
Ibarra 11', 65'; Rossi 16'; Garreta 24'	Report	Ihsanullah 47'; Butt 61'

Ipoh, Malaysia

Stadium: Azlan Shah Stadium

==== Four Nations Tournament ====
4 July 2007
Pool stage

Russia	2 – 6	Pakistan
Soukhikh 10'; Azarov 28'	Report	Ihsanullah 19'; Waqas 23'; Abbasi 34'; Ali 42', 67'; Imran 48'

Moscow, Russia

Stadium: Elektrostal Hockey Stadium

6 July 2006
Pool stage

Pakistan	2 – 2	Scotland
Warsi 10'; Imran 25'	Report	Dick 17'; Ralph 70'

Moscow, Russia

Stadium: Elektrostal Hockey Stadium

7 July 2007
Pool stage

Pakistan	5 – 0	Ukraine
Warsi 10'; Abbasi 42'; Imran 45', 51'; Butt 57'	Report

Moscow, Russia

Stadium: Elektrostal Hockey Stadium

8 July 2007
Final

Pakistan	4 – 0	Scotland
Ahmed 25'; Abbasi 37', 41'; Butt 54'	Report

Moscow, Russia

Stadium: Elektrostal Hockey Stadium

==== Good Luck Beijing Hockey International ====
8 August 2007
Pool stage

China	2 – 2	Pakistan
Yuba 61'; Xishang 65'	Report	Imran 19'; Ihsanullah 43'

Beijing, China

Stadium: Olympic Green Hockey Field

9 August 2007
Pool stage

Australia	2 – 2	Pakistan
Young 10'; Naylor 62'	Report	Imran 23', 63'

Beijing, China

Stadium: Olympic Green Hockey Field

11 August 2007
Pool stage

Pakistan	1 – 1	Malaysia
Ali 3'	Report	Mohan 49'

Beijing, China

Stadium: Olympic Green Hockey Field

13 August 2007
Third and fourth place

Pakistan	4 – 1	Malaysia
Butt 13'; Imran 17'; Waqas 24'; Abbas 39'	Report	Mohan 34'

Beijing, China

Stadium: Olympic Green Hockey Field

==== 2007 Hockey Asia Cup ====
31 August 2007
Pool stage

Pakistan	6 – 1	Hong Kong
Imran 11', 29'; Abbasi 13', 59'; Ihsanullah 38'; I. Khan 56'	Report	Arif 46'

Chennai, India

Stadium: Mayor Radhakrishnan Stadium

1 September 2007
Pool stage

Japan	3 – 1	Pakistan
Tomonori 29', 50'; Takahiko 42'	Report	Abbasi 47'

Chennai, India

Stadium: Mayor Radhakrishnan Stadium

3 September 2007
Pool stage

Pakistan	8 – 0	Singapore
Imran 4'; Haider 23', 27'; Aziz 25'; Ihsanullah 40'; Khan 63'; Butt 67', 70'	Report

Chennai, India

Stadium: Mayor Radhakrishnan Stadium

5 September 2007
Pool stage

Pakistan	3 – 3	Malaysia
Abbasi 17', 26'; Ali 33'	Report	Tajuddin 43', 57'; Azrafiq 69'

Chennai, India

Stadium: Mayor Radhakrishnan Stadium

8 September 2007
Crossover

Pakistan	10 – 0	Bangladesh
Waqas 8'; Islam 11'; Aziz 17', 68'; Imran 24', 45'; Haider 50', 56'; Arshad 63', 65'	Report

Chennai, India

Stadium: Mayor Radhakrishnan Stadium

9 September 2007
Fifth and sixth place

Pakistan	2 – 3	China
Arshad 30'; Butt 44'	Report	Yuzne 12', 54'; Liang 68'

Chennai, India

Stadium: Mayor Radhakrishnan Stadium

==== 2007 Hockey Champions Trophy ====
29 November 2007
Pool stage

Germany	5 – 2	Pakistan
Korn 9', 70'; Fürste 21'; Keller 22'; Witte 51'	Report	Waqas 27'; Shabbir 48'

Kuala Lumpur, Malaysia

Event: Malaysia National Hockey Stadium

30 November 2007
Pool stage

Pakistan	2 – 0	Spain
Waqas 54'; Ali 61'	Report

Kuala Lumpur, Malaysia

Stadium: Malaysia National Hockey Stadium

2 December 2007
Pool stage

Pakistan	1 – 2	Australia
Ali 57'	Report	Eglington 20'; Schubert 47'

Kuala Lumpur, Malaysia

Stadium: Malaysia National Hockey Stadium

3 December 2007
Pool stage

Pakistan	2 – 2	Malaysia
Ali 19'; Ghazanfar 35'	Report	Huat 56'; Mohan 64'

Kuala Lumpur, Malaysia

Stadium: Malaysia National Hockey Stadium

5 December 2007
Pool stage

Great Britain	4 – 1	Pakistan
Dick 15'; Moore 21'; Mantell 35'; Alexander 57'	Report	Imran 49'

Kuala Lumpur, Malaysia

Stadium: Malaysia National Hockey Stadium

6 December 2007
Pool stage

Pakistan	3 – 3	South Korea
Abbasi 26'; Waqas 58'; M. Ali 63'	Report	Jong-ho 6'; Hyo-sik 44'; Jong-hyun 47'

Kuala Lumpur, Malaysia

Stadium: Malaysia National Hockey Stadium

8 December 2007
Pool stage

Netherlands	4 – 1	Pakistan
Taekema 15', 38', 61'; De Nooijer 32'	Report	Waqas 19'

Kuala Lumpur, Malaysia

Stadium: Malaysia National Hockey Stadium

9 December 2007
Seventh and eighth place

Pakistan	3 – 2 (a.e.t.)	Malaysia
Arshad 40'; Imran 70', 73'	Report	Ahmad 58', 61'

Kuala Lumpur, Malaysia

Stadium: Malaysia National Hockey Stadium

=== 2008 ===
==== 2008 Series – China ====
14 March 2008
Test match

China	4 – 2	Pakistan
	Report	Saqlain 3'; Waqas 67'

Changzhou, China

Stadium: Wujin Hockey Stadium

16 March 2008
Test match

China	0 – 2	Pakistan
	Report	Waqas 7'; Atiq 60'

Changzhou, China

Stadium: Wujin Hockey Stadium

18 March 2008
Test match

China	1 – 3	Pakistan
	Report	Waqas 67'; Abbasi 26', 42'

Changzhou, China

Stadium: Wujin Hockey Stadium

19 March 2008
Test match

China	0 – 5	Pakistan
	Report	Waqas 2', 48'; Abbasi 5'; Butt 28'; Rasool 56'

Changzhou, China

Stadium: Wujin Hockey Stadium

22 March 2008
Test match

China	4 – 0	Pakistan
	Report

Changzhou, China

Stadium: Wujin Hockey Stadium

==== 2008 Sultan Azlan Shah Cup ====
8 May 2008
Pool stage

Pakistan	3 – 2	Malaysia
Ateeq 22'; Abbasi 28'; Saqlain 60'		Kelvinder 1'; Rahim 23'

Ipoh, Malaysia

Stadium: Azlan Shah Stadium

9 May 2008
Pool stage

Pakistan	6 – 3	New Zealand
Butt 11', 30', 60', 70'; Abbasi 14'; Saqlain 28'		Burrows 6'; Shaw 33', 47'

Ipoh, Malaysia

Stadium: Azlan Shah Stadium

11 May 2008
Pool stage

Pakistan	3 – 3	Argentina
Zubair 10'; Saqlain 44'; Akbar 63'		Ibarra 30'; Gilardi 50'; Bergner 56'

Ipoh, Malaysia

Stadium: Azlan Shah Stadium

12 May 2008
Pool stage

Canada	1 – 2	Pakistan
Kullar 1'		Butt 62'; Saqlain 65'

Ipoh, Malaysia

Stadium: Azlan Shah Stadium

14 May 2008
Pool stage

Belgium	5 – 3	Pakistan
Briels 2'; Dohmen 18'; C. Vandeweghe 24'; Dekeyser 37'; L. Vandeweghe 69'		Abbasi 4'; Butt 23'; Saqlain 35'

Ipoh, Malaysia

Stadium: Azlan Shah Stadium

15 May 2008
Pool stage

India	2 – 1	Pakistan
Sandeep 7'; Diwakar 26'		Saqlain 59'

Ipoh, Malaysia

Stadium: Azlan Shah Stadium

18 May 2008
Third and fourth place

Pakistan	1 – 2	New Zealand
Butt 21'		Child 23'; Stephenson 47'

Ipoh, Malaysia

Stadium: Azlan Shah Stadium

==== 2008 Hockey Setanta Sports Trophy ====
11 June 2008
Pool stage

Ireland	2 – 4	Pakistan
Lewis 8'; Cockram 10'	Report	Waqas 18'; Butt 19'; Akbar 65'; Saqlain 70'

Dublin, Ireland

Stadium:University College Dublin

12 June 2008
Pool stage

Pakistan	3 – 3	Great Britain
Haider 43'; Saqlain 52'; Zubair 59'	Report	R. Mantell 10'; Alexander 20'; Jackson 23'

Dublin, Ireland

Stadium:University College Dublin

14 June 2008
Pool stage

Pakistan	2 – 2	Canada
Butt 44', 53'	Report	Pearson 51'; R. Short 59'

Dublin, Ireland

Stadium:University College Dublin

15 June 2008
Final

Pakistan	3 – 2	Canada
Imran 3'; Khan 56'; Butt 67'	Report	Wettlaufer 38'; Fernandes 46'

Dublin, Ireland

Stadium:University College Dublin

==== 2008 Summer Olympics ====
11 August 2008
Pool stage

Pakistan	2 – 4	Great Britain
Abbasi 45'; Waqas 59'	Report	Tindall 2'; Moore 14'; Jackson 29'; Daly 62'

Beijing, China

Stadium:Olympic Green Hockey Field

13 August 2008
Pool stage

Canada	1 – 3	Pakistan
Kullar 35'	Report	Imran 39'; Rasool 39'; Waqas 57'

Beijing, China

Stadium:Olympic Green Hockey Field

15 August 2008
Pool stage

Pakistan	1 – 3	Australia
Abbasi 16'	Report	Schubert 20'; Dwyer 41'; Brooks 59'

Beijing, China

Stadium:Olympic Green Hockey Field

17 August 2008
Pool stage

Pakistan	3 – 1	South Africa
Javed 9'; Abbasi 44'; Saqlain 60'	Report	Smith 31'

Beijing, China

Stadium:Olympic Green Hockey Field

19 August 2008
Pool stage

Netherlands	4 – 2	Pakistan
Brouwer 41'; Taekema 46', 58'; Hertzberger 69'	Report	Imran 28'; Maqsood 65'

Beijing, China

Stadium:Olympic Green Hockey Field

21 August 2008
Seventh and eighth place

New Zealand	4 – 2	Pakistan
Child 26'; H. Shaw 39', 53'; Brooks 43'	Report	Bilgrami 46'; Butt 56'

Beijing, China

Stadium:Olympic Green Hockey Field

==== 2008 Hamburg Masters ====
3 October 2008
Pool stage

Pakistan	6 – 3	Belgium
Rasool 10'; Ali 28', 70'; Zubair 39'; Khan 48'; Imran 67'	Report	Boon 25'; Boccard 53'; Gucassoff 65'

Hamburg, Germany

Stadium:Uhlenhorster HC

4 October 2008
Pool stage

Malaysia	2 – 2	Pakistan
Rahim 4'; Azlan 52'	Report	Abbasi 50'; Khan 57'

Hamburg, Germany

Stadium:Uhlenhorster HC

5 October 2008
Pool stage

Pakistan	1 – 6	Germany
Abbasi 68'	Report	Häner 34'; Menke 38'; Rabente 46'; Lietz 52', 60'; Biederlack 70'

Hamburg, Germany

Stadium:Uhlenhorster HC

=== 2009 ===
==== 2009 Sultan Azlan Shah Cup ====
5 April 2009
Pool stage

Pakistan	2 – 3	Malaysia
Imran 10'; Haider 68'	Report	Rahim 9'; Shahrun 29'; Azlan 48'

Ipoh, Malaysia

Stadium:Azlan Shah Stadium

6 April 2009
Pool stage

New Zealand	3 – 2	Pakistan
Bhana 5'; Haig 43'; Couzins 68'	Report	Imran 6', 23'

Ipoh, Malaysia

Stadium:Azlan Shah Stadium

9 April 2009
Pool stage

Pakistan	4 – 0	Egypt
Imran 14'; Abbasi 18', 43', 67'	Report

Ipoh, Malaysia

Stadium:Azlan Shah Stadium

11 April 2009
Pool stage

India	2 – 1	Pakistan
Sandeep 28', 60'	Report	Saqlain 50'

Ipoh, Malaysia

Stadium:Azlan Shah Stadium

12 April 2009
Third and fourth place

New Zealand	2 – 1	Pakistan
Petherick 12'; Baker 13'	Report	Abbasi 35'

Ipoh, Malaysia

Stadium:Azlan Shah Stadium

==== 2009 Asia Cup ====
9 May 2009
Pool stage

Pakistan	1 – 1	China
Ali 69'		Hu Huiren 61'

Kuantan, Malaysia

Stadium: Hoki Wisma Belia Stadium

10 May 2009
Pool stage

India	2 – 3	Pakistan
Prabhjot 15'; Rajpal 45'		Khan 33', 36'; Abbas 54'

Kuantan, Malaysia

Stadium: Hoki Wisma Belia Stadium

14 May 2009
Semi-finals

Pakistan	4 – 2	Malaysia
Butt 18', 63'; Ali 46'; Khan 66'		Ismail 3', 69'

Kuantan, Malaysia

Stadium: Hoki Wisma Belia Stadium

16 May 2009
Final

South Korea	1 – 0	Pakistan
Kim Byung-hoon 66'

Kuantan, Malaysia

Stadium: Hoki Wisma Belia Stadium

==== England Internationals ====
30 June 2009

England	1 – 2	Pakistan
Jackson 21'		Ali 19'; Irfan 32'

Staffordshire, England

Stadium: Cannock Hockey Club

2 July 2009

England	2 – 3	Pakistan
Tindall 54'; Daly 58'		Waqas 13'; Imran 22'; Khan 51'

Staffordshire, England

Stadium: Cannock Hockey Club

3 June 2009

England	1 – 1	Pakistan
Mackay 14'		Haidar 45'

Staffordshire, England

Stadium: Cannock Hockey Club

==== 2009 FIH Hockey World Cup Qualifiers ====
31 October 2009
Pool stage

Pakistan	5 – 0	Italy
Abbas 31', 47'; Imran 43'; Zubair 52'; Khan 68'	Report

Lille, France

Stadium: Lille Hockey Club

1 November 2009
Pool stage

Pakistan	5 – 0	Russia
Butt 23'; Abbasi 31'; Abbas 33'; Imran 37'; Khan 43'	Report

Lille, France

Stadium: Lille Hockey Club

3 November 2009
Pool stage

France	2 – 4	Pakistan
Soyez 23'; Becuwe 67'	Report	Ali 8'; Abbas 26', 37'; Butt 55'

Lille, France

Stadium: Lille Hockey Club

5 November 2009
Pool stage

Japan	1 – 6	Pakistan
Nagasawa 42'	Report	Abbas 19', 52'; Butt 30', 56'; Zubair 54'; Abbasi 61'

Lille, France

Stadium: Lille Hockey Club

7 November 2009
Pool stage

Pakistan	2 – 3	Poland
Waqas 29'; Zubair 42'	Report	Mikula 45'; Zywiczka 58'; Kmiec 60'

Lille, France

Stadium: Lille Hockey Club

8 November 2009
Final

Pakistan	3 – 1	Japan
Khan 12'; Abbas 24', 41'	Report	Tsubouchi 27'

Lille, France

Stadium: Lille Hockey Club

==== 2009 Hockey Champions Challenge I ====
6 December 2009
Pool stage

Pakistan	2 – 1	Canada
Abbas 14', 31'	Report	Fernandes 47'

Salta, Argentina

Stadium:

8 December 2009
Pool stage

Argentina	3 – 1	Pakistan
Callioni 1'; Ibarra 31', 52'	Report	Abbas 66'

Salta, Argentina

Stadium:

10 December 2009
Pool stage

Pakistan	4 – 1	South Africa
Abbas 20'; Abbasi 49'; Khan 53'; Ali 63'	Report	Norris-Jones 33'

Salta, Argentina

Stadium:

12 December 2009
Semi-finals

India	3 – 6	Pakistan
Mahadik 8', 62'; Ram 67'	Report	Butt 2', 29', 64'; Abbas 32', 70'; Khan 58'

Salta, Argentina

Stadium:

13 December 2009
Final

New Zealand	4 – 2	Pakistan
Archibald 15'; Burrows 20', 66'; Edwards 65'	Report	Abbas 7'; Butt 35'

Salta, Argentina

Stadium:
