= Pakistan at the 2008 Summer Olympics =

- IOC code: PAK
- NOC: National Olympic Committee of Pakistan
- Website: www.nocpakistan.org

in Beijing
- Competitors: 21 in 4 sports
- Flag bearer: Zeeshan Ashraf
- Medals: Gold 0 Silver 0 Bronze 0 Total 0

Summer Olympics appearances (overview)
- 1948; 1952; 1956; 1960; 1964; 1968; 1972; 1976; 1980; 1984; 1988; 1992; 1996; 2000; 2004; 2008; 2012; 2016; 2020; 2024; 2028

Other related appearances
- India (1900–pres.); Bangladesh (1984–pres.)

Pakistan competed at the 2008 Summer Olympics in Beijing, China. The country sent 21 athletes, including two women (Sadaf Siddiqui in athletics and Kiran Khan in swimming). The men's field hockey team comprised 16 players out of the Pakistani delegation.

== Athletics ==
Men

Athlete	Event	Heat		Quarterfinal		Semifinal		Final	
Athlete	Event	Result	Rank	Result	Rank	Result	Rank	Result	Rank
Abdul Rashid	110 m hurdles	14.52	8	Did not advance					

Women

Athlete	Event	Heat		Quarterfinal		Semifinal		Final	
Athlete	Event	Result	Rank	Result	Rank	Result	Rank	Result	Rank
Sadaf Siddiqui	100 m	12.41	7	Did not advance					

Key

- Note–Ranks given for track events are within the athlete's heat only
- Q = Qualified for the next round
- q = Qualified for the next round as a fastest loser or, in field events, by position without achieving the qualifying target
- NR = National record
- N/A = Round not applicable for the event
- Bye = Athlete not required to compete in round

== Field hockey ==
Pakistan's men's team qualified for the 2008 Games. In the group play, they won two and lost three matches, finishing fourth in the group. This qualified them for a match against New Zealand for 7th/8th place, which they lost. The team's final ranking for the tournament was 8th.

=== Men's tournament ===
Roster

The following is the Pakistani roster in the men's field hockey tournament of the 2008 Summer Olympics.

Head Coach: Naveed Alam

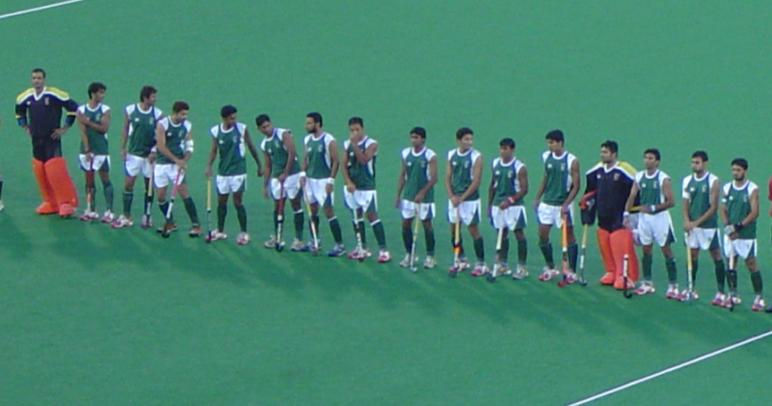
Pakistan's team just before the group stage match against Australia. From the left: S. Akbar, Bilgrami, Saqlain, Warsi, Zubair, Imran, Abbasi, Rana, Rasool, W. Akbar, Javed, Waqas, Ahmed, Maqsood, Butt, Ashraf.

1. Salman Akbar (GK)
2. Zeeshan Ashraf (c)
3. Muhammad Imran
4. Muhammad Javed
5. Muhammad Saqlain
6. Adnan Maqsood
7. Muhammad Waqas
8. Waqas Akbar
9. Shakeel Abbasi
10. Rehan Butt
11. Syed Abbas Haider Bilgrami
12. Nasir Ahmed (GK)
13. Syed Imran Ali Warsi
14. Muhammad Asif Rana
15. Muhammad Zubair
16. Shafqat Rasool

Reserve:

- Muddasir Abbas
- Shabbir Ahmed Khan

Group play

Pos	Team	Pld	W	D	L	GF	GA	GD	Pts	Qualification
1	Netherlands	5	4	1	0	16	6	+10	13	Semi-finals
2	Australia	5	3	2	0	24	7	+17	11	Semi-finals
3	Great Britain	5	2	2	1	10	7	+3	8	Fifth place game
4	Pakistan	5	2	0	3	11	13	−2	6	Seventh place game
5	Canada	5	1	1	3	10	17	−7	4	Ninth place game
6	South Africa	5	0	0	5	4	25	−21	0	Eleventh place game

11 August 2008
10:30

Pakistan	2–4	Great Britain
Abbasi 45'; Waqas 59'	Report	Tindall 2'; Moore 14'; Jackson 29'; Daly 62'

Umpires:
John Wright (RSA)
Amarjit Singh (MAS)

13 August 2008
18:00

Canada	1–3	Pakistan
Kullar 35'	Report	Imran 39'; Rasool 39'; Waqas 57'

Umpires:
Kim Hong-lae (KOR)
David Leiper (GBR)

15 August 2008
18:30

Pakistan	1–3	Australia
Abbasi 16'	Report	Schubert 20'; Dwyer 41'; Brooks 59'

Umpires:
Henrik Ehlers (DEN)
Gary Simmonds (RSA)

17 August 2008
18:00

Pakistan	3–1	South Africa
Javed 9'; Abbasi 44'; Saqlain 60'	Report	Smith 31'

Umpires:
Amarjit Singh (MAS)
Kim Hong-lae (KOR)

19 August 2008
08:30

Netherlands	4–2	Pakistan
Brouwer 41'; Taekema 46', 58'; Hertzberger 69'	Report	Imran 28'; Maqsood 65'

Umpires:
David Leiper (GBR)
Kim Hong-lae (KOR)

21 August 2008
11:00

New Zealand	4–2	Pakistan
Child 26'; H. Shaw 39', 53'; Brooks 43'	Report	Bilgrami 46'; Butt 56'

Umpires:
Kim Hong-lae (KOR)
Gary Simmonds (RSA)

== Shooting ==
Men

Athlete	Event	Qualification		Final	
Athlete	Event	Points	Rank	Points	Rank
Siddique Umer	10 m air rifle	578	48	Did not advance	
Siddique Umer	50 m rifle 3 positions	1116	49	Did not advance	

== Swimming ==
Men

Athlete	Event	Heat		Semifinal		Final	
Athlete	Event	Time	Rank	Time	Rank	Time	Rank
Adil Baig	50 m freestyle	25.66	74	Did not advance			

Women

Athlete	Event	Heat		Semifinal		Final	
Athlete	Event	Time	Rank	Time	Rank	Time	Rank
Kiran Khan	50 m freestyle	29.84	69	Did not advance			

== See also ==
- Pakistan at the 2008 Summer Paralympics
