= Hockey at the 2006 Commonwealth Games – Men's tournament =

Men's hockey at the 2006 Commonwealth Games
Tournament details
- Host country: Australia
- City: Melbourne
- Dates: 17–25 March 2006
- Teams: 10 (from 5 confederations)
- Venue: State Netball and Hockey Centre

Final positions
- Champions: Australia (3rd title)
- Runner-up: Pakistan
- Third place: Malaysia

Tournament statistics
- Matches played: 27
- Goals scored: 135 (5 per match)
- Top scorer: (India) Sandeep Singh (7 goals)

Men's field hockey at the 2006 Commonwealth Games took place between 17 March and 25 March. The competition consisted of a round robin stage of two groups of five with the winners and runners-up of each group qualifying for the semifinals. All matches were played at the State Netball and Hockey Centre in the Parkville area of Melbourne.

The competition was won by Australia who defeated Pakistan 3–0 to claim their third successive commonwealth title.

== Results ==
=== Preliminary round ===
==== Pool A ====
| Pos | Team | Pld | W | D | L | GF | GA | GD | Pts | Qualification |
|---|---|---|---|---|---|---|---|---|---|---|
| 1 | Australia (H) | 4 | 4 | 0 | 0 | 20 | 5 | +15 | 12 | Semi-finals |
| 2 | England | 4 | 3 | 0 | 1 | 13 | 10 | +3 | 9 | Semi-finals |
| 3 | New Zealand | 4 | 2 | 0 | 2 | 14 | 10 | +4 | 6 | |
| 4 | Scotland | 4 | 1 | 0 | 3 | 4 | 13 | −9 | 3 | |
| 5 | Canada | 4 | 0 | 0 | 4 | 3 | 16 | −13 | 0 | |

Source: The CGF
Rules for classification: 1) points; 2) goal difference; 3) goals scored; 4) head-to-head result.
(H) Hosts

17 March 2006
10:30

| New Zealand | 3–4 | England |
|---|---|---|
| Hari 4'; H. Shaw 38'; Hopping 65' | Report | Mantell 19'; Alexander 32'; Daly 46'; Middleton 56' |

Umpires:
Syed Kamran Shah (PAK)
Ravinderpal Singh (MAS)

17 March 2006
19:00

| Australia | 5–1 | Scotland |
|---|---|---|
| Butler 2'; Livermore 12'; Wells 31'; Doerner 50'; Brooks 59' | Report | Stott 5' |

Umpires:
Colin Hutchinson (IRE)
Javed Shaikh (IND)

18 March 2006
08:30

| New Zealand | 4–1 | Canada |
|---|---|---|
| Child 15'; McAleese 21', 60'; Brooks 62' | Report | Fernandes 10' |

Umpires:
Syed Kamran Shah (PAK)
Colin Hutchinson (IRE)

18 March 2006
20:30

| Scotland | 1–3 | England |
|---|---|---|
| Mitchell 16' | Report | Mantell 9'; Daly 11'; Jones 51' |

Umpires:
Ravinderpal Singh (MAS)
Gary Simmonds (RSA)

19 March 2006
16:00

| Canada | 1–5 | Australia |
|---|---|---|
| Wettlaufer 68' | Report | McCann 8', 28'; Eglington 27'; George 45', 58' |

Umpires:
Gary Simmonds (RSA)
Colin Hutchinson (IRE)

20 March 2006
18:30

| New Zealand | 5–0 | Scotland |
|---|---|---|
| Hari 30'; Burrows 42', 61'; H. Shaw 54', 67' | Report |

Umpires:
Colin Hutchinson (IRE)
Gary Simmonds (RSA)

21 March 2006
10:30

| Australia | 5–1 | England |
|---|---|---|
| Eglington 2', 32', 63'; Livermore 37', 40' | Report | Tindall 59' |

Umpires:
Gary Simmonds (RSA)
Colin Hutchinson (IRE)

21 March 2006
16:30

| Canada | 0–2 | Scotland |
|---|---|---|
| | Report | Christie 7'; Ralph 47' |

Umpires:
Ravinderpal Singh (MAS)
Syed Kamran Shah (PAK)

22 March 2006
16:00

| England | 5–1 | Canada |
|---|---|---|
| Tindall 12'; Daly 24', 40', 52'; Mantell 47' | Report | Grimes 39' |

Umpires:
Syed Kamran Shah (PAK)
Javed Shaikh (IND)

22 March 2006
18:00

| Australia | 5–2 | New Zealand |
|---|---|---|
| Dwyer 38'; Knowles 43'; De Young 58'; Schubert 63'; Doerner 67' | Report | Brooks 36'; Child 69' |

Umpires:
Colin Hutchinson (IRE)
Ravinderpal Singh (MAS)

==== Pool B ====
| Pos | Team | Pld | W | D | L | GF | GA | GD | Pts | Qualification |
|---|---|---|---|---|---|---|---|---|---|---|
| 1 | Pakistan | 4 | 3 | 1 | 0 | 18 | 8 | +10 | 10 | Semi-finals |
| 2 | Malaysia | 4 | 2 | 1 | 1 | 16 | 8 | +8 | 7 | Semi-finals |
| 3 | India | 4 | 2 | 1 | 1 | 14 | 6 | +8 | 7 | |
| 4 | South Africa | 4 | 1 | 1 | 2 | 8 | 6 | +2 | 4 | |
| 5 | Trinidad and Tobago | 4 | 0 | 0 | 4 | 3 | 31 | −28 | 0 | |

Source: The CGF
Rules for classification: 1) points; 2) goal difference; 3) goals scored; 4) head-to-head result.

17 March 2006
08:30

| Malaysia | 1–1 | India |
|---|---|---|
| Amin 25' | Report | Sandeep 44' |

Umpires:
Gerald Curran (SCO)
Simon Taylor (NZL)

17 March 2006
16:00

| Trinidad and Tobago | 1–6 | South Africa |
|---|---|---|
| Quan Chan 50' | Report | Symons 8'; Tsolekile 15'; Phillips 18'; Madsen 23'; Paul 32'; Reid-Ross 60' |

Umpires:
Nicholas Lockhart (ENG)
Paul Ludwig (AUS)

18 March 2006
15:30

| Pakistan | 4–1 | India |
|---|---|---|
| Khan 23'; Aziz 39'; Maqsood 41', 61' | Report | Tejbir 14' |

Umpires:
Paul Ludwig (AUS)
Gerald Curran (SCO)

18 March 2006
18:30

| Trinidad and Tobago | 0–8 | Malaysia |
|---|---|---|
| | Report | Mohan 14', 38'; Amin 17', 20', 33', 54'; Azlan 35'; Logan 58' |

Umpires:
Simon Taylor (NZL)
Nicholas Lockhart (ENG)

19 March 2006
18:00

| South Africa | 1–1 | Pakistan |
|---|---|---|
| Basson 55' | Report | Warsi 66' |

Umpires:
Nicholas Lockhart (ENG)
Simon Taylor (NZL)

20 March 2006
18:00

| India | 10–1 | Trinidad and Tobago |
|---|---|---|
| Rajpal 4'; Deepak 9', 17', 30'; Sandeep 38', 57', 64', 70'; Kanwalpreet 41'; Tushar 45' | Report | Quan Chan 18' |

Umpires:
David Gentles (AUS)
Gerald Curran (SCO)

21 March 2006
08:30

| South Africa | 1–2 | Malaysia |
|---|---|---|
| Symons 27' | Report | Logan 45'; Chua 46' |

Umpires:
Simon Taylor (NZL)
Nicholas Lockhart (ENG)

21 March 2006
14:00

| Pakistan | 7–1 | Trinidad and Tobago |
|---|---|---|
| Abbasi 5'; Imran 9'; Butt 12', 14', 25'; Zubair 33'; Shabbir 53' | Report | Quan Chan 29' |

Umpires:
Gerald Curran (SCO)
Christopher Wilson (CAN)

22 March 2006
11:00

| India | 2–0 | South Africa |
|---|---|---|
| Sandeep 5'; Tushar 51' | Report |

Umpires:
Nicholas Lockhart (ENG)
Simon Taylor (NZL)

22 March 2006
13:00

| Malaysia | 5–6 | Pakistan |
|---|---|---|
| Kuhan 5', 24', 45', 58'; Chua 48' | Report | Maqsood 8'; Abbasi 10'; Shabbir 14'; Imran 21'; Butt 37', 61' |

Umpires:
Gerald Curran (SCO)
Gary Simmonds (RSA)

=== Classification matches ===
==== Ninth and tenth place ====
24 March 2006
08:30

| Canada | 2–0 | Trinidad and Tobago |
|---|---|---|
| Pearson 28'; P. Short 34' | Report |

Umpires:
Syed Kamran Shah (PAK)
Ravinderpal Singh (MAS)

==== Seventh and eighth place ====
24 March 2006
20:00

| Scotland | 2–1 | South Africa |
|---|---|---|
| Ralph 30'; Stott 61' | Report | Symons 49' |

Umpires:
Paul Ludwig (AUS)
Christopher Wilson (CAN)

==== Fifth and sixth place ====
24 March 2006
13:30

| New Zealand | 2–1 (a.e.t.) | India |
|---|---|---|
| Burrows 59'; Hari 73' | Report | Sandeep 22' |

Umpires:
Colin Hutchinson (IRE)
Nicholas Lockhart (ENG)

=== Medal round ===
Semi-finals
24 March 2006
Australia | 6
Malaysia | 0
24 March 2006
Pakistan (a.e.t) | 2
England | 1

Final
26 March 2006
Australia | 3
Pakistan | 0
Third place
26 March 2006
Malaysia | 2
England | 0

==== Semi-finals ====
24 March 2006
11:00

| Australia | 6–0 | Malaysia |
|---|---|---|
| Livermore 31', 50'; Dwyer 42'; Doerner 57', 70'; De Young 67' | Report |

Umpires:
Gerald Curran (SCO)
Colin Hutchinson (IRE)

24 March 2006
17:30

| Pakistan | 2–1 (a.e.t.) | England |
|---|---|---|
| Abbasi 54', 73' | Report | Daly 68' |

Umpires:
David Gentles (AUS)
Simon Taylor (NZL)

==== Bronze medal match ====
26 March 2006
10:30

| Malaysia | 2–0 | England |
|---|---|---|
| Amin 33'; Tengku 59' | Report |

Umpires:
Simon Taylor (NZL)
Paul Ludwig (AUS)

==== Gold medal match ====
26 March 2006
13:00

| Australia | 3–0 | Pakistan |
|---|---|---|
| De Young 18'; Doerner 58'; Dwyer 61' | Report |

Umpires:
Colin Hutchinson (IRE)
Gerald Curran (SCO)

== Final standings ==
As per statistical convention in field hockey, matches decided in extra time are counted as wins and losses, while matches decided by penalty shoot-outs are counted as draws.

| Pos | Team | Pld | W | D | L | GF | GA | GD | Pts | Final result |
|---|---|---|---|---|---|---|---|---|---|---|
| 1st place, gold medalist(s) | Australia (H) | 6 | 6 | 0 | 0 | 29 | 5 | +24 | 18 | Gold Medal |
| 2nd place, silver medalist(s) | Pakistan | 6 | 4 | 1 | 1 | 20 | 12 | +8 | 13 | Silver Medal |
| 3rd place, bronze medalist(s) | Malaysia | 6 | 3 | 1 | 2 | 18 | 14 | +4 | 10 | Bronze Medal |
| 4 | England | 6 | 3 | 0 | 3 | 14 | 14 | 0 | 9 | |
| 5 | New Zealand | 5 | 3 | 0 | 2 | 16 | 11 | +5 | 9 | |
| 6 | India | 5 | 2 | 1 | 2 | 15 | 8 | +7 | 7 | |
| 7 | Scotland | 5 | 2 | 0 | 3 | 6 | 14 | −8 | 6 | |
| 8 | South Africa | 5 | 1 | 1 | 3 | 9 | 8 | +1 | 4 | |
| 9 | Canada | 5 | 1 | 0 | 4 | 5 | 16 | −11 | 3 | |
| 10 | Trinidad and Tobago | 5 | 0 | 0 | 5 | 3 | 33 | −30 | 0 | |

Source: The CGF
(H) Hosts

== Goalscorers ==
There were 135 goals scored in 27 matches, for an average of 5 goals per match.

7 goals

- (India) Sandeep Singh

6 goals

- (England) Matthew Daly
- (Malaysia) Amin Rahim

5 goals

- (Australia) Luke Doerner
- (Australia) Brent Livermore
- (Pakistan) Rehan Butt

4 goals

- (Australia) Nathan Eglington
- (Malaysia) Kuhan Shanmuganathan
- (Pakistan) Shakeel Abbasi

3 goals

- (Australia) Jamie Dwyer
- (Australia) Liam de Young
- (England) Simon Mantell
- (India) Deepak Thakur
- (New Zealand) Phillip Burrows
- (New Zealand) Bevan Hari
- (New Zealand) Hayden Shaw
- (Pakistan) Adnan Maqsood
- (South Africa) Ian Symons
- (Trinidad and Tobago) Dwain Quan Chan

2 goals

- (Australia) Bevan George
- (Australia) Michael McCann
- (England) James Tindall
- (India) Tushar Khandekar
- (Malaysia) Mohan Jiwa
- (Malaysia) Chua Boon Huat
- (Malaysia) Logan Raj
- (New Zealand) Gareth Brooks
- (New Zealand) Simon Child
- (New Zealand) Shea McAleese
- (Pakistan) Muhammad Imran
- (Pakistan) Muhammad Shabbir
- (Scotland) David Ralph
- (Scotland) Niall Stott

1 goal

- (Australia) Travis Brooks
- (Australia) Dean Butler
- (Australia) Mark Knowles
- (Australia) Grant Schubert
- (Australia) Matthew Wells
- (Canada) Wayne Fernandes
- (Canada) Connor Grimes
- (Canada) Mark Pearson
- (Canada) Peter Short
- (Canada) Paul Wettlaufer
- (England) Richard Alexander
- (England) Martin Jones
- (England) Barry Middleton
- (India) Kanwalpreet Singh
- (India) Rajpal Singh
- (India) Tejbir Singh
- (Malaysia) Azlan Misron
- (Malaysia) Tengku Tajuddin
- (New Zealand) Blair Hopping
- (Pakistan) Tariq Aziz
- (Pakistan) Mudassar Ali Khan
- (Pakistan) Syed Imran Ali Warsi
- (Pakistan) Muhammad Zubair
- (Scotland) Jonathan Christie
- (Scotland) David Mitchell
- (South Africa) Reece Basson
- (South Africa) Wayne Madsen
- (South Africa) John Paul
- (South Africa) Leroy Phillips
- (South Africa) Justin Reid-Ross
- (South Africa) Lungile Tsolekile
