= 2005 Sultan Azlan Shah Cup =

Field hockey tournament

Tournament details
- Host country: Malaysia
- City: Ipoh
- Teams: 7
- Venue: Azlan Shah Stadium

Final positions
- Champions: Australia (4th title)
- Runner-up: South Korea
- Third place: Pakistan

Tournament statistics
- Matches played: 24
- Goals scored: 105 (4.38 per match)
- Top scorer: (South Korea) Jang Jong-Hyun (6 goals)

The 2005 Sultan Azlan Shah Cup was the 14th edition of field hockey tournament the Sultan Azlan Shah Cup.

== Participating nations ==
Seven countries participated in the tournament:

- India
- Malaysia
- Australia
- Pakistan
- South Africa
- New Zealand
- South Korea

== Fixtures and results ==
All times are Malaysia Standard Time (UTC+08:00)

=== Preliminary round ===
Pos	Team	Pld	W	D	L	GF	GA	GD	Pts	Qualification
1	Australia	6	4	2	0	19	10	+9	14	Final
2	South Korea	6	4	1	1	22	13	+9	13	Final
3	Pakistan	6	4	1	1	12	8	+4	13	Third Place Match
4	New Zealand	6	2	1	3	13	13	0	7	Third Place Match
5	Malaysia	6	2	1	3	8	12	−4	7	Fifth Place Match
6	India	6	1	1	4	8	15	−7	4	Fifth Place Match
7	South Africa	6	0	1	5	7	18	−11	1	

Source: Rediff
Rules for classification: 1) points; 2) goal difference; 3) goals scored; 4) head-to-head result.

==== Fixtures ====
26 May 2005
16:05

Pakistan	2–1	New Zealand
Zakir 15'; Warsi 33'	Report	Brooks 22'

26 May 2005
18:05

India	2–1	South Africa
Aiyappa 47', 70'	Report	Abrahams 50'

26 May 2005
20:05

Malaysia	1–3	Australia
Hairul 63'	Report	Brooks 6', 17'; Hammond 25'

27 May 2005
16:05

New Zealand	2–2	India
Smith 21'; Hari 25'	Report	Rajpal 44'; Prabhjot 63'

27 May 2005
18:05

Australia	3–3	South Korea
Doerner 52'; McCann 63'; Dwyer 66'	Report	Hong 19', 38'; You 69'

27 May 2005
20:05

South Africa	1–1	Malaysia
King 15'	Report	Prabhakaran 52'

28 May 2005
18:05

South Korea	2–3	Pakistan
Kang 14'; Jang J. 44'	Report	Imran 2'; Abbasi 15'; Ali 30'

29 May 2005
16:05

Malaysia	4–1	India
Kuhan 6', 64'; Alcantra 49'; Rahim 53'	Report	Tirkey 9'

29 May 2005
18:05

Pakistan	2–0	South Africa
Abbasi 24'; Butt 30'	Report

29 May 2005
20:05

New Zealand	1–2	Australia
Kosoof 70'	Report	McCann 59'; Schubert 66'

30 May 2005
18:05

South Africa	0–2	New Zealand
	Report	Burrows 10'; Archibald 49'

30 May 2005
20:05

South Korea	4–0	Malaysia
Jang J. 43', 47'; Hong 53'; Seo 68'	Report

31 May 2005
18:05

Australia	2–2	Pakistan
Doerner 29'; Livermore 64'	Report	Abbasi 3'; Imran 43'

31 May 2005
20:05

India	1–4	South Korea
Aiyappa 20'	Report	Kim K. 35+'; Kang 43', 47'; You 49'

1 June 2005
16:05

South Africa	3–8	Australia
Smith 11'; McInroy 49'; Gay 59'	Report	Matheson 2'; Hammond 20'; Brooks 24'; Dwyer 25', 70'; McCann 28'; Livermore 56'; Schubert 57'

1 June 2005
18:05

India	2–3	Pakistan
Deepak 39'; Sandeep 53'	Report	Zakir 8'; Butt 11'; Ali 29'

1 June 2005
20:05

Malaysia	1–3	New Zealand
Kuhan 43'	Report	Burrows 2'; Kosoof 50'; Collin 55'

2 June 2005
18:05

New Zealand	4–6	South Korea
Burrows 4'; Brooks 5', 44'; Collin 20'	Report	Yoon 9'; Jang J. 33'; Kim B. 37'; Kim S. 40'; You 64'; Seo 70'

3 June 2005
16:05

South Korea	3–2	South Africa
Jang J. 20'; Kim K. 45'; Seo 68'	Report	King 7'; Phillips 57'

3 June 2005
18:05

Australia	1–0	India
Dwyer 65'	Report

3 June 2005
20:05

Pakistan	0–1	Malaysia
	Report	Kuhan 40'

=== Classification round ===
==== Fifth and sixth place ====
5 June 2005
08:05

Malaysia	1–2 (a.e.t.)	India
Hairul 3'	Report	Aiyappa 20'; Prabhjot 76'

==== Third and fourth place ====
5 June 2005
15:35

Pakistan	4–2	New Zealand
Butt 10', 67'; Zakir 17'; Khan 62'	Report	Couzins 21'; Petherick 27'

==== Final ====
5 June 2005
18:05

Australia	4–3 (a.e.t.)	South Korea
McCann 9', 62'; Doerner 54'; Victory 81'	Report	Kang 22'; Seo 24'; Jang J. 42'

== Statistics ==
=== Final standings ===
Pos	Team	Pld	W	D	L	GF	GA	GD	Pts	Qualification
1st place, gold medalist(s)	Australia	7	5	2	0	23	13	+10	17	Gold Medal
2nd place, silver medalist(s)	South Korea	7	4	1	2	25	17	+8	13	Silver Medal
3rd place, bronze medalist(s)	Pakistan	7	5	1	1	16	10	+6	16	Bronze Medal
4	New Zealand	7	2	1	4	15	17	−2	7	
5	India	7	2	1	4	10	16	−6	7	
6	Malaysia	7	2	1	4	9	14	−5	7	
7	South Africa	6	0	1	5	7	18	−11	1	

Source: Rediff

=== Goalscorers ===
There were 105 goals scored in 24 matches, for an average of 4.38 goals per match.

6 goals

- (South Korea) Jang Jong-Hyun

5 goals

- (Australia) Michael McCann

4 goals

- (Australia) Jamie Dwyer
- (India) Len Aiyappa
- (Malaysia) Kuhan Shanmuganathan
- (Pakistan) Rehan Butt
- (South Korea) Seo Jong-Ho
- (South Korea) Kang Seong-Jung

3 goals

- (Australia) Travis Brooks
- (Australia) Luke Doerner
- (New Zealand) Gareth Brooks
- (New Zealand) Phil Burrows
- (Pakistan) Shakeel Abbasi
- (Pakistan) Adnan Zakir
- (South Korea) Hong Eun-Seong
- (South Korea) You Hyo-Sik
- (South Korea) Kim Kyung-Seok

2 goals

- (Australia) Robert Hammond
- (Australia) Brent Livermore
- (Australia) Grant Schubert
- (India) Prabhjot Singh
- (Malaysia) Hairul Nizam
- (New Zealand) Bryce Collin
- (New Zealand) David Kosoof
- (Pakistan) Akhtar Ali
- (Pakistan) Muhammad Imran
- (South Africa) Justin King

1 goal

- (Australia) Elias Matheson
- (Australia) Craig Victory
- (India) Sandeep Michael
- (India) Rajpal Singh
- (India) Deepak Thakur
- (India) Dilip Tirkey
- (Malaysia) Robert Alcantra
- (Malaysia) Prabhakaran
- (Malaysia) Amin Rahim
- (New Zealand) Ryan Archibald
- (New Zealand) Dean Couzins
- (New Zealand) Bevan Hari
- (New Zealand) Richard Petherick
- (New Zealand) Darren Smith
- (Pakistan) Mudassar Ali Khan
- (Pakistan) Imran Warsi
- (South Africa) Clyde Abrahams
- (South Africa) Richard Gay
- (South Africa) John McInroy
- (South Africa) Stephen Phillips
- (South Africa) Emile Smith
- (South Korea) Kim Byung-Hoon
- (South Korea) Yoon Sung-Hoon
