= 2006 Sultan Azlan Shah Cup =

Hockey tournament

Tournament details
- Host country: Malaysia
- City: Ipoh
- Teams: 8
- Venue(s): Azlan Shah Stadium

Final positions
- Champions: Netherlands (1st title)
- Runner-up: Australia
- Third place: India

Tournament statistics
- Matches played: 18
- Goals scored: 81 (4.5 per match)
- Best player: (Netherlands) Roderick Weusthof

The 2006 Sultan Azlan Shah Cup was the 15th edition of field hockey tournament the Sultan Azlan Shah Cup.

== Participating nations ==
Eight countries participated in the tournament:

- India
- Malaysia
- Australia
- Pakistan
- Argentina
- Netherlands
- New Zealand
- South Korea

== Results ==
All times are Malaysia Standard Time (UTC+08:00)

=== Preliminary round ===
==== Pool A ====
Pos	Team	Pld	W	D	L	GF	GA	GD	Pts	Qualification
1	India	3	2	0	1	9	6	+3	6	Semi-finals
2	Australia	3	1	1	1	6	6	0	4	Semi-finals
3	South Korea	3	1	1	1	5	5	0	4	
4	Malaysia (H)	3	0	2	1	6	9	−3	2	

Source: FIH
Rules for classification: 1) points; 2) goal difference; 3) goals scored; 4) head-to-head result.
(H) Hosts

18 June 2006
15:00

Australia	4–1	India
Elder 7'; Naylor 11', 40'; Doerner 64'	Report	Tejbir 23'

18 June 2006
17:00

South Korea	2–2	Malaysia

19 June 2006
15:00

South Korea	3–0	Australia
Jang 20', 23'; You H. 21'	Report

19 June 2006
17:00

India	5–2	Malaysia

21 June 2006
15:00

India	3–0	South Korea
Tejbir 11'; Sandeep 15'; Tushar 53'	Report

21 June 2006
17:00

Australia	2–2	Malaysia
Livermore 27'; Brooks 41'	Report	Ismail 16'; Megat 70'

==== Pool B ====
Pos	Team	Pld	W	D	L	GF	GA	GD	Pts	Qualification
1	New Zealand	3	1	2	0	6	5	+1	5	Semi-finals
2	Netherlands	3	1	1	1	6	4	+2	4	Semi-finals
3	Pakistan	3	1	1	1	6	7	−1	4	
4	Argentina	3	1	0	2	5	7	−2	3	

Source: FIH
Rules for classification: 1) points; 2) goal difference; 3) goals scored; 4) head-to-head result.

18 June 2006
08:30

Argentina	2–3	New Zealand
M. Vila 4', 29'	Report	Shaw 38'; Brooks 50'; Petherick 60'

19 June 2006
08:30

Netherlands	2–3	Pakistan

20 June 2006
15:00

Argentina	1–4	Netherlands
	Report

20 June 2006
17:00

Pakistan	3–3	New Zealand
15', 50', 70'	Report	Shaw 6'; McAleese 40'; Collier 60'

22 June 2006
15:00

Pakistan	0–2	Argentina
	Report	Saladino 47', 48'

22 June 2006
17:00

Netherlands	0–0	New Zealand
	Report

=== Classification round ===
==== Fifth to eighth place classification ====
===== Seventh and eighth place =====
24 June 2006
07:30

Malaysia	2–3 (a.e.t.)	Argentina
Chua 20'; Razie 27'	Report	Paredes 31'; Almada 47'; Argento 79'

===== Fifth and sixth place =====
24 June 2006
09:30

South Korea	1–4	Pakistan
Kang 42'	Report	Abbasi 15'; Saqlain 23'; Ali 46'; Waqas 64'

==== First to fourth place classification ====
Semi-finals
23 June 2006
India	0
Netherlands	1
23 June 2006
New Zealand	1
Australia	7

Final
25 June 2006
Netherlands	6
Australia	2
Third Place
25 June 2006
India	3
New Zealand	2

===== Semi-finals =====
23 June 2006
15:00

India	0–1	Netherlands
	Report	Weusthof 64'

23 June 2006
17:00

New Zealand	1–7	Australia
Petherick 69'	Report	Schubert 7', 48'; Doerner 21', 23'; Naylor 38'; Brooks 58'; Butler 60'

===== Third and fourth place =====
25 June 2006
15:00

India	3–2	New Zealand
Prasad 8', 35'; Sandeep 43'	Report	Child 10'; Shaw 39'

===== Final =====
25 June 2006
17:00

Netherlands	6–2	Australia
Weusthof 6', 47', 66'; Taekema 22'; De Nooijer 42'; R. Brouwer 52'	Report	Naylor 60'; Schubert 69'

== Final ranking ==
Pos	Team	Pld	W	D	L	GF	GA	GD	Pts	Qualification
1st place, gold medalist(s)	Netherlands	5	3	1	1	13	6	+7	10	Gold Medal
2nd place, silver medalist(s)	Australia	5	2	1	2	15	13	+2	7	Silver Medal
3rd place, bronze medalist(s)	India	5	3	0	2	12	9	+3	9	Bronze Medal
4	New Zealand	5	1	2	2	9	15	−6	5	
5	Pakistan	4	2	1	1	10	8	+2	7	
6	South Korea	4	1	1	2	6	9	−3	4	
7	Argentina	4	2	0	2	8	9	−1	6	
8	Malaysia (H)	4	0	2	2	8	12	−4	2	

Source: FIH
(H) Hosts
