= 2006 India–Pakistan field hockey test series =

2006 India-Pakistan field hockey test series
Tournament details
- City: Chandigarh, Jalandhar; Lahore, Faisalabad, Rawalpindi
- Dates: 17 February 2006 – 26 February 2006
- Venue: 5 in 5 host cities

Final positions
- Champions: Pakistan won the series 3–1

Tournament statistics
- Matches played: 6
- Goals scored: 21 (3.5 per match)
- Top scorer: (Pakistan) Tariq Aziz (4 goals)

The 2006 Indo-Pak series (known as the Airtel Trophy for sponsorship reasons) was the 8th series of bilateral field hockey matches between Pakistan and India.

The six match series was played over two legs on home and away basis with three matches hosted in each country from 17 February to 2006 to 26 February 2006. Pakistan won the series 3–1. Pakistan won their fourth consecutive and overall sixth series against India. This was the first time India did not lose the away leg of the series and remained unbeaten in Pakistan.

== Background ==
Prior to the start of the series Pakistan had won five out of seven bilateral series where as India won one and one was drawn. The two teams had met in December last year earlier in Chennai at the 2005 Champions Trophy with India winning 2–3. Both teams participated in a 4-Nations tournament in Netherlands month before that but did not face each other Pakistan won the tournament defeating Australia 4–3 in the final.

== Venues ==
Match	Location	Venue	Date
First	Chandigarh, India	Sector 42 Hockey Stadium	17 February
Second	Chandigarh, India	Sector 42 Hockey Stadium	18 February
Third	Jalandhar, India	Surjit Singh Stadium	20 February
Fourth	Lahore, Pakistan	National Hockey Stadium	22 February
Fifth	Faisalabad, Pakistan	Faisalabad Hockey Stadium	24 February
Sixth	Rawalpindi, Pakistan	Army Hockey Stadium	26 February

== Squads ==
India announced its squad on 2 February 2006. India named a rather young squad leaving out many veteran players like Gagan Ajit Singh, Deepak Thakur, captain Dileep Tirkey, Viren Rasquinha and Prabhjot Singh. The Pakistan squad was announced on 8 February 2006. The team was announced by Chief Selector Akhtar Rasool after the two days trials in Islamabad. Muhmmad Saqlain was named as captain despite his ill disciplinary record recently.

India	Pakistan
Bharat Kumar Chetri; Adrian D'Souza; Kanwalpreet Singh; Harpal Singh; V. R. Raghunath; V. S. Vinaya; Vikram Pillay; Ignace Tirkey (C); Prabodh Tirkey; Sandeep Singh; Rajpal Singh; Deedar Singh; Sardara Singh; Tushar Khandker; Tijbir Singh; Arjun Halappa; Adam Sinclair; Shivendra Singh; Hari Prasad	Muhammad Saqlain (C); Salman Akbar; Nasir Ahmed; Zeeshan Ashraf; Muhammad Imran; Imran Warsi; Imran Khan; Dilawar Bhatti; Adnan Maqsood; Sajjad Anwar; Rehan Butt; Mudassar Ali Khan; Shakeel Abbasi; Tariq Aziz; Shabbir Hussain; Adnan Zakir; Mudassar Khan; Waqas Sharif; Shabbir Khan; Muhmmad Zubair
Coach (India) Rajinder Singh Jr.	Coach (Pakistan) Asif Bajwa

== Results ==
- Pakistan won the series 3–1.

First leg
Match	Date	Score	Location
1	17 February	India 1–2 Pakistan	Chandigarh
2	18 February	India 1–3 Pakistan	Chandigarh
3	20 February	India 1–2 Pakistan	Jalandhar

Second leg
Match	Date	Score	Location
1	22 February	Pakistan 1–1 India	Lahore
2	24 February	Pakistan 1–2 India	Faisalabad
3	26 February	Pakistan 3–3 India	Rawalpindi

== Matches ==
=== First leg ===
Match 1

17 February 2006

(India)	1–2	(Pakistan)
Khandekar 62'	Report	Aziz 15'; Abbasi 56'

Sector 42 Hockey Stadium, Chandigarh

Match 2

18 February 2006

(India)	1–3	(Pakistan)
Sandeep 44'	Report	Butt 41', 68'; Aziz 59'

Sector 42 Hockey Stadium, Chandigarh

Match 3

20 February 2006

(India)	1–2	(Pakistan)
Tajbir 26'	Report	Aziz 16'; Saqlain 30'

Surjit Hockey Stadium, Jalandhar

=== Second leg ===
Match 1

22 February 2006

(Pakistan)	1–1	(India)
Imran 16'	Report	Tajbir 65'

National Hockey Stadium, Lahore

Match 2

24 February 2006

(Pakistan)	1–2	(India)
Warsi 28'	Report	Rajpal 53'; Kanwalpreet 56'

Faisalabad Hockey Stadium, Faisalabad

Match 3

26 February 2006

(Pakistan)	3–3	(India)
Aziz 4'; Saqlain 11'; Shabbir 44'	Report	Sandeep 54'; Tajbir 60'; Pillay 67'

Army Hockey Stadium, Rawalpindi

== Statistics ==
Team	P	W	D	L	GF	GA	GD
Pakistan	6	3	2	1	12	9	+3
India	6	1	2	3	9	12	-3

=== Goalscorers ===
There were 21 goals scored in 6 matches for an average of 3.5 goals per match.

4 goals

- (Pakistan) Tariq Aziz

3 goals

- (India) Tajbir Singh

2 goals

- (Pakistan) Rehan Butt
- (Pakistan) Muhammad Saqlain
- (India) Sandeep Singh

1 goal

- (Pakistan) Shakeel Abbasi
- (India) Tushar Khandekar
- (Pakistan) Muhammad Imran
- (India) Rajpal Singh
- (India) Kanwalpreet Singh
- (Pakistan) Imran Warsi
- (Pakistan) Shabbir Khan
- (India) Vikram Pillay
