= 2005 Men's Hockey RaboTrophy =

Tournament details
- Host country: Netherlands
- City: Amsterdam
- Teams: 8
- Venue: Wagener Stadium

Final positions
- Champions: Pakistan (1st title)
- Runner-up: Australia
- Third place: Spain

Tournament statistics
- Matches played: 16
- Goals scored: 68 (4.25 per match)
- Top scorer: (Australia) Grant Schubert (6 goals)
- Best player: (Australia) Grant Schubert

The 2005 Men's Hockey RaboTrophy was the third edition of the men's field hockey tournament. The RaboTrophy was held in Amsterdam from 14 to 21 August 2005, and featured eight of the top nations in men's field hockey.

Pakistan won the tournament for the first time, defeating Australia 4–3 in the final.

== Competition format ==
The eight teams were split into pools of four, with each team participating in a single round robin format. At the conclusion of the pool stage, the top two teams of each pool contested the final, with the teams consecutively competing in classification matches based on pool standings.

== Teams ==
The following eight teams competed for the title:

- Australia
- England
- Germany
- India
- Netherlands
- Pakistan
- South Korea
- Spain

== Results ==
All times are local (Central European Time).

=== Preliminary round ===
==== Pool A ====
Pos	Team	Pld	W	D	L	GF	GA	GD	Pts	Qualification
1	Pakistan	3	2	1	0	8	1	+7	7	Advanced to Final
2	Spain	3	2	1	0	5	1	+4	7	
3	Germany	3	1	0	2	3	10	−7	3	
4	India	3	0	0	3	2	6	−4	0	

Source: Deutscher Hockey-Bund
Rules for classification: 1) Points; 2) Goal difference; 3) Goals scored; 4) Games won; 5) Head-to-head.

14 August 2005
15:00

India	0–1	Spain
	Report	Amat 25'

Umpires:
Nicholas Lockhart (ENG)
Murray Grime (AUS)

16 August 2005
12:30

Germany	2–1	India
Witthaus 4'; Meinert 48'	Report	Kanwalpreet 41'

Umpires:
Jonathan Wright (RSA)
Kim Hong-Lae (KOR)

16 August 2005
17:30

Spain	0–0	Pakistan
	Report

Umpires:
Philip Schellekens (NED)
Nicholas Lockhart (ENG)

18 August 2005
12:30

Pakistan	3–1	India
Saqlain 15'; Imran 30'; Abbasi 68'	Report	Didar 56'

Umpires:
Jonathan Wright (RSA)
Philip Schellekens (NED)

18 August 2005
15:00

Spain	4–1	Germany
Sojo 54'; Freixa 55'; Tubau 67'; Sala 70'	Report	Sonnenschein 48'

Umpires:
Nicholas Lockhart (ENG)
Kim Hong-Lae (KOR)

19 August 2005
12:30

Germany	0–5	Pakistan
	Report	Khan 17'; Butt 46', 66'; Shabbir 51'; Saqlain 57'

Umpires:
Murray Grime (AUS)
Jason McCracken (NZL)

==== Pool B ====
Pos	Team	Pld	W	D	L	GF	GA	GD	Pts	Qualification
1	Australia	3	3	0	0	17	4	+13	9	Advanced to Final
2	South Korea	3	2	0	1	8	9	−1	6	
3	Netherlands (H)	3	0	1	2	3	7	−4	1	
4	England	3	0	1	2	4	12	−8	1	

Source: Deutscher Hockey-Bund
Rules for classification: 1) Points; 2) Goal difference; 3) Goals scored; 4) Games won; 5) Head-to-head.
(H) Hosts

14 August 2005
12:30

South Korea	5–1	England
Jang 13'; Seo J. 33', 66'; Kang 35'; Lee S. 66'	Report	Hawes 22'

Umpires:
Raghu Prasad (IND)
Xavier Adell (ESP)

16 August 2005
15:00

Australia	7–1	South Korea
Schubert 5', 70+'; McCann 18', 25'; Brooks 22'; De Young 50'; Hammond 68'	Report	Hong 64'

Umpires:
Jason McCracken (NZL)
Christian Blasch (GER)

16 August 2005
20:00

Netherlands	1–1	England
M. Brouwer 14'	Report	Clarke 35'

Umpires:
Raghu Prasad (IND)
Murray Grime (AUS)

17 August 2005
12:30

England	2–6	Australia
Alexander 38'; Moore 60'	Report	Wells 33'; Dwyer 44'; Schubert 50'; Bishop 55'; Doerner 66'; Naylor 70'

Umpires:
Jason McCracken (NZL)
Xavier Adell (ESP)

17 August 2005
15:00

Netherlands	1–2	South Korea
Weusthof 37'	Report	Lee J. 26'; Yoon 46'

Umpires:
Christian Blasch (GER)
Raghu Prasad (IND)

19 August 2005
15:00

Australia	4–1	Netherlands
Schubert 4', 64'; Doerner 53'; Brooks 69'	Report	Taekema 38'

Umpires:
Jonathan Wright (RSA)
Xavier Adell (ESP)

=== Classification round ===
==== Seventh and eighth place ====
20 August 2005
12:30

India	2–1	England
Gagan 33'; Deepak 53'	Report	Tindall 69'

Umpires:
Kim Hong-Lae (KOR)
Philip Schellekens (NED)

==== Fifth and sixth place ====
20 August 2005
15:00

Germany	0–5	Netherlands
	Report	Taekema 26', 44', 52'; Weusthof 47'; Evers 70'

Umpires:
Raghu Prasad (IND)
Jonathan Wright (RSA)

==== Third and fourth place ====
21 August 2005
12:30

Spain	2–1	South Korea
Freixa 31', 57'	Report	Yoon 65'

Umpires:
Christian Blasch (GER)
Murray Grime (AUS)

==== Final ====
21 August 2005
15:00

Pakistan	4–3	Australia
Warsi 18'; Zakir 32'; Butt 42'; Khan 50'	Report	Brooks 8'; Schubert 24'; Bishop 34'

Umpires:
Jason McCracken (NZL)
Nicholas Lockhart (ENG)

== Awards ==
The following awards were presented at the conclusion of the tournament:

Player of the Tournament	Top Goalscorer	Most Promising Player	Fair Play Trophy
(Australia) Grant Schubert	(Australia) Grant Schubert	(Netherlands) Robert van der Horst	South Korea

== Statistics ==
=== Final standings ===
As per statistical convention in field hockey, matches decided in extra time are counted as wins and losses, while matches decided by penalty shoot-outs are counted as draws.

Pos	Team	Pld	W	D	L	GF	GA	GD	Pts	Status
1st place, gold medalist(s)	Pakistan	4	3	1	0	12	4	+8	10	Gold Medal
2nd place, silver medalist(s)	Australia	4	3	0	1	20	8	+12	9	Silver Medal
3rd place, bronze medalist(s)	Spain	4	3	1	0	7	2	+5	10	Bronze Medal
4	South Korea	4	2	0	2	9	11	−2	6	
5	Netherlands (H)	4	1	1	2	8	7	+1	4	
6	Germany	4	1	0	3	3	15	−12	3	
7	India	4	1	0	3	4	7	−3	3	
8	England	4	0	1	3	5	14	−9	1	

Source: Deutscher Hockey-Bund
(H) Hosts

=== Goalscorers ===
There were 68 goals scored in 16 matches, for an average of 4.25 goals per match.

6 goals

- (Australia) Grant Schubert

4 goals

- (Netherlands) Taeke Taekema

3 goals

- (Australia) Travis Brooks
- (Pakistan) Rehan Butt
- (Spain) Santiago Freixa

2 goals

- (Australia) Benjamin Bishop
- (Australia) Luke Doerner
- (Australia) Michael McCann
- (Netherlands) Roderick Weusthof
- (Pakistan) Mudassar Ali Khan
- (Pakistan) Muhammad Saqlain
- (South Korea) Seo Jong-Ho
- (South Korea) Yoon Sung-Hoon

1 goal

- (Australia) Jamie Dwyer
- (Australia) Robert Hammond
- (Australia) Matthew Naylor
- (Australia) Matthew Wells
- (Australia) Liam de Young
- (England) Richard Alexander
- (England) Jonathan Clarke
- (England) Benjamin Hawes
- (England) Robert Moore
- (England) James Tindall
- (Germany) Niklas Meinert
- (Germany) Nico Sonnenschein
- (Germany) Matthias Witthaus
- (India) Didar Singh
- (India) Gagan Ajit Singh
- (India) Kanwalpreet Singh
- (India) Deepak Thakur
- (Netherlands) Matthijs Brouwer
- (Netherlands) Floris Evers
- (Pakistan) Shakeel Abbasi
- (Pakistan) Muhammad Imran
- (Pakistan) Shabbir Hussain
- (Pakistan) Imran Warsi
- (Pakistan) Adnan Zakir
- (South Korea) Hong Eun-Seong
- (South Korea) Lee Jeong-Seon
- (South Korea) Jang Jong-Hyun
- (South Korea) Kang Seong-Jung
- (South Korea) Lee Sung-Min
- (Spain) Pol Amat
- (Spain) Albert Sala
- (Spain) Víctor Sojo
- (Spain) Eduardo Tubau
