= 2005 Men's Hockey Hamburg Masters =

International field hockey tournament

Tournament details
- Host country: Germany
- City: Hamburg
- Teams: 4
- Venue: Uhlenhorster HC

Final positions
- Champions: Netherlands (1st title)
- Runner-up: Australia
- Third place: Germany

Tournament statistics
- Matches played: 6
- Goals scored: 36 (6 per match)
- Top scorer: (Germany) Christopher Zeller (4 goals)

The 2005 Men's Hockey Hamburg Masters was the eleventh edition of the Hamburg Masters, consisting of a series of test matches. It was held in Hamburg, Germany, from 12 to 14 August 2005, and featured four of the top nations in men's field hockey.

== Competition format ==
The tournament featured the national teams of Australia, the Netherlands, Pakistan, and the hosts, Germany, competing in a round-robin format, with each team playing each other once. Three points were awarded for a win, one for a draw, and none for a loss.

| Country | 2005 FIH Ranking | Best World Cup Finish | Best Olympic Games Finish |
|---|---|---|---|
| Australia | 1 | Champions (1986) | Champions (2004) |
| Germany | 2 | Champions (2002) | Champions (1992) |
| Netherlands | 3 | Champions (1973, 1990, 1998) | Champions (1996, 2000) |
| Pakistan | 4 | Champions (1971, 1978, 1982, 1994) | Champions (1960, 1968, 1984) |

== Officials ==
The following umpires were appointed by the International Hockey Federation to officiate the tournament:

- David Gentles (AUS)
- Bart de Liefde (NED)
- Markus Petter (GER)
- James Pilgrim (ENG)
- Haider Rasool (PAK)

== Results ==
All times are local (Central European Summer Time).

=== Pool ===
| Pos | Team | Pld | W | D | L | GF | GA | GD | Pts | Result |
|---|---|---|---|---|---|---|---|---|---|---|
| 1 | Netherlands | 3 | 2 | 1 | 0 | 11 | 8 | +3 | 7 | Tournament Champion |
| 2 | Australia | 3 | 2 | 0 | 1 | 11 | 6 | +5 | 6 | |
| 3 | Germany (H) | 3 | 1 | 1 | 1 | 5 | 9 | −4 | 4 | |
| 4 | Pakistan | 3 | 0 | 0 | 3 | 9 | 13 | −4 | 0 | |

Source: Deutscher Hockey-Bund
Rules for classification: 1) Points; 2) Goal difference; 3) Goals scored; 4) Games won; 5) Head-to-head.
(H) Hosts

=== Fixtures ===
12 August 2005
16:30

| Germany | 3–1 | Pakistan |
|---|---|---|
| C. Zeller 16', 67', 70' | Report | Maqsood 48' |

Umpires:
Bart de Liefde (NED)
David Gentles (AUS)

12 August 2005
18:45

| Australia | 1–3 | Netherlands |
|---|---|---|
| Naylor 67' | Report | M. Brouwer 18'; Derikx 40'; Weusthof 47' |

Umpires:
Markus Petter (GER)
James Pilgrim (ENG)

13 August 2005
14:00

| Netherlands | 6–5 | Pakistan |
|---|---|---|
| Reckers 18'; R. Brouwer 19', 61'; Weusthof 23'; De Nooijer 34'; Klaver 38' | Report | Butt 40', 41', 66'; Mehmood 47', 50' |

Umpires:
David Gentles (AUS)
Markus Petter (GER)

13 August 2005
16:30

| Germany | 0–6 | Australia |
|---|---|---|
| | Report | McCann 3'; Bishop 33', 65'; Doerner 45'; Schubert 49'; Livermore 69' |

Umpires:
James Pilgrim (ENG)
Haider Rasool (PAK)

14 August 2005
12:00

| Australia | 4–3 | Pakistan |
|---|---|---|
| Livermore 6'; Dwyer 8'; Schubert 37', 51' | Report | Imran 40', 53'; Abbasi 45' |

Umpires:
Bart de Liefde (NED)
James Pilgrim (ENG)

14 August 2005
14:30

| Netherlands | 2–2 | Germany |
|---|---|---|
| Reckers 52'; Weusthof 66' | Report | Witte 19'; C. Zeller 60' |

Umpires:
Haider Rasool (PAK)
David Gentles (AUS)

== Statistics ==
=== Final standings ===
1. Netherlands
2. Australia
3. Germany
4. Pakistan

=== Goalscorers ===
There were 36 goals scored in 6 matches, for an average of 6 goals per match.

4 goals

- (Germany) Christopher Zeller

3 goals

- (Australia) Grant Schubert
- (Netherlands) Roderick Weusthof
- (Pakistan) Rehan Butt

2 goals

- (Australia) Benjamin Bishop
- (Australia) Brent Livermore
- (Netherlands) Ronald Brouwer
- (Netherlands) Robert Reckers
- (Pakistan) Muhammad Imran
- (Pakistan) Nasir Mehmood

1 goal

- (Australia) Luke Doerner
- (Australia) Jamie Dwyer
- (Australia) Michael McCann
- (Australia) Matthew Naylor
- (Germany) Philip Witte
- (Netherlands) Matthijs Brouwer
- (Netherlands) Robert Derikx
- (Netherlands) Karel Klaver
- (Netherlands) Teun de Nooijer
- (Pakistan) Shakeel Abbasi
- (Pakistan) Adnan Maqsood
