= 2008 Men's Hockey Setanta Sports Trophy =

Setanta Sports Trophy
Tournament details
- Host country: (Republic of Ireland) Ireland
- City: Dublin
- Teams: 4 (from 3 confederations)
- Venue: University College Dublin

Final positions
- Champions: Pakistan (1st title)
- Runner-up: Canada
- Third place: Great Britain

Tournament statistics
- Matches played: 8
- Goals scored: 36 (4.5 per match)
- Top scorer: (Pakistan) Rehan Butt (4 goals)

The 2008 Men's Hockey Setanta Sports Trophy was the second edition of the Setanta Sports Trophy, a men's field hockey tournament. It was held in Dublin, Ireland, from June 11 to 15, 2008, and featured four of the top nations in men's field hockey. The tournament was held simultaneously with the women's competition.

== Competition format ==
The tournament featured the national teams of Canada, Great Britain, Pakistan, and the hosts, Ireland, competing in a round-robin format, with each team playing each other once. Three points were awarded for a win, one for a draw, and none for a loss.

Country	September 2008 FIH Ranking	Best World Cup finish	Best Olympic Games finish
Canada	13	Eighth place (1998)	Tenth place (2000)
Great Britain	6	Runners-up (1986)	Champions (1920, 1988)
Ireland	18	Twelfth place (1978, 1990)	Runners-up (1908)
Pakistan	8	Champions (1971, 1978, 1982, 1994)	Champions (1960, 1968, 1984)

== Officials ==
The following umpires were appointed by the International Hockey Federation to officiate the tournament:

- Ihsan-ul-Haque Babar (PAK)
- Marcin Grochal (POL)
- Jonathan Hyrtsak (CAN)
- Martin Madden (GBR)
- Christopher McConkey (IRE)

== Results ==
All times are local (Irish Standard Time).

=== Preliminary round ===
Pos	Team	Pld	W	D	L	GF	GA	GD	Pts	Qualification
1	Pakistan	3	1	2	0	9	7	+2	5	Advanced to Final
2	Canada	3	1	2	0	6	5	+1	5	Advanced to Final
3	Great Britain	3	1	1	1	6	6	0	4	
4	Ireland (H)	3	0	1	2	7	10	−3	1	

Source: BBC
Rules for classification: 1) points; 2) goal difference; 3) goals scored; 4) head-to-head result.
(H) Hosts

==== Fixtures ====
11 June 2008
16:00

Great Britain	0–1	Canada
	Report	P. Short 58'

Umpires:
Ihsan-ul-Haque Babar (PAK)
Christopher McConkey (IRE)

11 June 2008
20:00

Ireland	2–4	Pakistan
Lewis 8'; Cockram 10'	Report	Waqas 18'; Butt 19'; Akbar 65'; Saqlain 70'

Umpires:
Marcin Grochal (POL)
Martin Madden (GBR)

12 June 2008
16:00

Pakistan	3–3	Great Britain
Haider 43'; Saqlain 52'; Zubair 59'	Report	R. Mantell 10'; Alexander 20'; Jackson 23'

Umpires:
Christopher McConkey (IRE)
Jonathan Hyrtsak (CAN)

12 June 2008
20:00

Ireland	3–3	Canada
Magee 14'; Sothern 16'; Darling 41'	Report	Pearson 31'; Kahlon 42'; R. Short 49'

Umpires:
Marcin Grochal (POL)
Ihsan-ul-Haque Babar (PAK)

14 June 2008
17:00

Pakistan	2–2	Canada
Butt 44', 53'	Report	Pearson 51'; R. Short 59'

Umpires:
Martin Madden (GBR)
Marcin Grochal (POL)

14 June 2008
19:00

Great Britain	3–2	Ireland
Kirkham 8'; Middleton 15'; R. Mantell 27'	Report	Watt 5'; Darling 64'

Umpires:
Jonathan Hyrtsak (CAN)
Ihsan-ul-Haque Babar (PAK)

=== Classification round ===
==== Third and fourth place ====
15 June 2008
14:05

Great Britain	2–1	Ireland
Daly 41'; Dick 48'	Report	Butler 59'

Umpires:
Jonathan Hyrtsak (CAN)
Marcin Grochal (POL)

==== Final ====
15 June 2008
16:30

Pakistan	3–2	Canada
Imran 3'; Khan 56'; Butt 67'	Report	Wettlaufer 38'; Fernandes 46'

Umpires:
Christopher McConkey (IRE)
Martin Madden (GBR)

== Statistics ==
=== Final standings ===
Pos	Team	Pld	W	D	L	GF	GA	GD	Pts	Status
1st place, gold medalist(s)	Pakistan	4	2	2	0	12	9	+3	8	Tournament Champion
2nd place, silver medalist(s)	Canada	4	1	2	1	8	8	0	5	
3rd place, bronze medalist(s)	Great Britain	4	2	1	1	8	7	+1	7	
4	Ireland (H)	4	0	1	3	8	12	−4	1	

Source: BBC
(H) Hosts

=== Goalscorers ===
There were 36 goals scored in 8 matches, for an average of 4.5 goals per match.

4 goals

- (Pakistan) Rehan Butt

2 goals

- (Canada) Mark Pearson
- (Canada) Robert Short
- (United Kingdom) Richard Mantell
- (Ireland) Michael Darling
- (Pakistan) Muhammad Saqlain

1 goal

- (Canada) Wayne Fernandes
- (Canada) Ravi Kahlon
- (Canada) Peter Short
- (Canada) Paul Wettlaufer
- (United Kingdom) Richard Alexander
- (United Kingdom) Matthew Daly
- (United Kingdom) Stephen Dick
- (United Kingdom) Ashley Jackson
- (United Kingdom) Glenn Kirkham
- (United Kingdom) Barry Middleton
- (Ireland) Stephen Butler
- (Ireland) Timothy Cockram
- (Ireland) Timothy Lewis
- (Ireland) Eugene Magee
- (Ireland) Alan Sothern
- (Ireland) Michael Watt
- (Pakistan) Salman Akbar
- (Pakistan) Abbas Haider
- (Pakistan) Muhammad Imran
- (Pakistan) Shabbir Khan
- (Pakistan) Muhammad Waqas
- (Pakistan) Muhammad Zubair
