= 2008 Sultan Azlan Shah Cup =

Field hockey tournament

Tournament details
- Host country: Malaysia
- City: Ipoh
- Teams: 7
- Venue: Azlan Shah Stadium

Final positions
- Champions: Argentina (1st title)
- Runner-up: India
- Third place: New Zealand

Tournament statistics
- Matches played: 24
- Goals scored: 112 (4.67 per match)
- Top scorer: (India) Sandeep Singh (9 goals)

The 2008 Sultan Azlan Shah Cup was the 17th edition of field hockey tournament the Sultan Azlan Shah Cup.

== Participating nations ==
Seven countries participated in the tournament:

- India
- Malaysia
- New Zealand
- Pakistan
- Argentina
- Belgium
- Canada

== Results ==
All times are Malaysia Standard Time (UTC+08:00)

=== Preliminary round ===
==== Pool ====
Pos	Team	Pld	W	D	L	GF	GA	GD	Pts	Qualification
1	Argentina	6	4	2	0	19	8	+11	14	Final
2	India	6	4	0	2	17	16	+1	12	Final
3	Pakistan	6	3	1	2	18	16	+2	10	Third Place Match
4	New Zealand	6	3	0	3	14	14	0	9	Third Place Match
5	Belgium	6	2	0	4	15	17	−2	6	Fifth Place Match
6	Canada	6	1	2	3	7	12	−5	5	Fifth Place Match
7	Malaysia	6	1	1	4	9	16	−7	4	

Source: Azlan Shah Cup
Rules for classification: 1) points; 2) goal difference; 3) goals scored; 4) head-to-head result.

==== Fixtures ====
8 May 2008
16:00

India	3–4	New Zealand
Sandeep 14', 20', 60'	Report	Stephenson 22'; Child 32'; Burrows 45'; Brooks 54'

8 May 2008
18:00

Argentina	2–1	Belgium
Sosa 33'; Argento 60'	Report	Truyens 54'

8 May 2008
20:00

Pakistan	3–2	Malaysia
Ateeq 22'; Abbasi 28'; Saqlain 60'	Report	Kelvinder 1'; Rahim 23'

9 May 2008
16:00

Canada	1–0	Belgium
Guest 51'	Report

9 May 2008
18:00

Pakistan	6–3	New Zealand
Butt 11', 30', 60', 70'; Abbasi 14'; Saqlain 28'	Report	Burrows 6'; Shaw 33', 47'

9 May 2008
20:00

Argentina	5–1	India
Callioni 11', 44'; Ibarra 31'; Argento 45'; López 53'	Report	Sandeep 25'

11 May 2008
16:00

Canada	1–3	India
Fernandes 8'	Report	Diwakar 44', 51'; Shivendra 53'

11 May 2008
18:00

Malaysia	2–0	New Zealand
Azlan 32'; Selvaraju 43'	Report

11 May 2008
20:00

Pakistan	3–3	Argentina
Zubair 10'; Saqlain 44'; Akbar 63'	Report	Ibarra 30'; Gilardi 50'; Bergner 56'

12 May 2008
16:00

Belgium	4–6	India
De Saedeleer 24'; Briels 45', 59'; C. Vandeweghe 61'	Report	Shivendra 9', 68'; Diwakar 22'; Sandeep 29', 35'; Sunil 32'

12 May 2008
18:00

Canada	1–2	Pakistan
Kullar 1'	Report	Butt 62'; Saqlain 65'

12 May 2008
18:00

Malaysia	0–5	Argentina
	Report	Callioni 19', 28'; Gilardi 46'; Cammareri 54'; Argento 68'

14 May 2008
16:00

New Zealand	1–2	Argentina
Collier 32'	Report	López 9'; Gilardi 15'

14 May 2008
18:00

Belgium	5–3	Pakistan
Briels 2'; Dohmen 18'; C. Vandeweghe 24'; Dekeyser 37'; L. Vandeweghe 69'	Report	Abbasi 4'; Butt 23'; Saqlain 35'

14 May 2008
20:00

Malaysia	2–2	Canada
Chua 19'; Rahim 27'	Report	Sukhwinder 23'; Tupper 62'

15 May 2008
16:00

India	2–1	Pakistan
Sandeep 7'; Diwakar 26'	Report	Saqlain 59'

15 May 2008
18:00

New Zealand	3–0	Canada
Kosoof 20'; Couzins 48'; Wilson 63'	Report

15 May 2008
20:00

Belgium	4–2	Malaysia
C. Vandeweghe 20', 43'; Dekeyser 52'; Briels 69'	Report	Rahim 24', 46'

17 May 2008
16:00

Argentina	2–2	Canada
Callioni 48'; Sosa 60'	Report	Sukhwinder 61'; Kahlon 69'

17 May 2008
18:00

India	2–1	Malaysia
Shivendra 24'; Sandeep 53'	Report	Rahim 70+'

17 May 2008
20:00

New Zealand	3–1	Belgium
Shaw 9'; Child 22', 45'	Report	Dohmen 59'

=== Classification round ===
==== Fifth and sixth place ====
18 May 2008
16:00

Belgium	3–4 (a.e.t.)	Canada
Dekeyser 3', 8'; Luycx 58'	Report	Grimes 5'; Kahlon 12'; Kullar 45'; Wright 83'

==== Third and fourth place ====
18 May 2008
18:00

Pakistan	1–2	New Zealand
Butt 21'	Report	Child 23'; Stephenson 47'

==== Final ====
18 May 2008
20:00

Argentina	2–1 (a.e.t.)	India
Almada 14', 73'	Report	Sandeep 10'

== Statistics ==
=== Final standings ===
Pos	Team	Pld	W	D	L	GF	GA	GD	Pts	Qualification
1st place, gold medalist(s)	Argentina	7	5	2	0	21	9	+12	17	Gold Medal
2nd place, silver medalist(s)	India	7	4	0	3	18	18	0	12	Silver Medal
3rd place, bronze medalist(s)	New Zealand	7	4	0	3	16	15	+1	12	Bronze Medal
4	Pakistan	7	3	1	3	19	18	+1	10	
5	Canada	7	2	2	3	11	15	−4	8	
6	Belgium	7	2	0	5	18	21	−3	6	
7	Malaysia	6	1	1	4	9	16	−7	4	

Source: Azlan Shah Cup

=== Goalscorers ===
There were 112 goals scored in 24 matches, for an average of 4.67 goals per match.

9 goals

- (India) Sandeep Singh

6 goals

- (Pakistan) Rehan Butt
- (Pakistan) Muhammad Saqlain

5 goals

- (Argentina) Facundo Callioni
- (Malaysia) Amin Rahim

4 goals

- (Belgium) Thomas Briels
- (Belgium) Jérôme Dekeyser
- (Belgium) Charles Vandeweghe
- (India) Diwakar Ram
- (India) Shivendra Singh
- (New Zealand) Simon Child
- (Pakistan) Shakeel Abbasi

3 goals

- (Argentina) Tomás Argento
- (Argentina) Juan Ignacio Gilardi
- (New Zealand) Hayden Shaw

2 goals

- (Argentina) Mario Almada
- (Argentina) Pedro Ibarra
- (Argentina) Juan Martín López
- (Argentina) Martín Sosa
- (Belgium) John-John Dohmen
- (Canada) Ravi Kahlon
- (Canada) Bindi Kullar
- (Canada) Sukhwinder Singh
- (New Zealand) Phil Burrows
- (New Zealand) Lloyd Stephenson

1 goal

- (Argentina) Ignacio Bergner
- (Argentina) Lucas Cammareri
- (Belgium) Alexandre de Saedeleer
- (Belgium) Maxime Luycx
- (Belgium) Jérôme Truyens
- (Belgium) Loïc Vandeweghe
- (Canada) Wayne Fernandes
- (Canada) Connor Grimes
- (Canada) Matthew Guest
- (Canada) Scott Tupper
- (Canada) Phillip Wright
- (India) S. V. Sunil
- (Malaysia) Chua Boon Huat
- (Malaysia) Azlan Misron
- (Malaysia) Selvaraju Sandrakasi
- (Malaysia) Kelvinder Singh
- (New Zealand) Gareth Brooks
- (New Zealand) Benjamin Collier
- (New Zealand) Dean Couzins
- (New Zealand) David Kosoof
- (New Zealand) Nicholas Wilson
- (Pakistan) Waqas Akbar
- (Pakistan) Muhammad Ateeq
- (Pakistan) Muhammad Zubair
