= 2008 Men's Hockey Hamburg Masters =

Tournament details
- Host country: Germany
- City: Hamburg
- Teams: 4
- Venue: Uhlenhorster HC

Final positions
- Champions: Germany (10th title)
- Runner-up: Malaysia
- Third place: Pakistan

Tournament statistics
- Matches played: 6
- Goals scored: 34 (5.67 per match)
- Top scorer(s): (Germany) Tobias Lietz (Malaysia) Amin Rahim (3 goals)

The 2008 Men's Hockey Hamburg Masters was the fourteenth edition of the Hamburg Masters, consisting of a series of test matches. It was held in Hamburg, Germany, from 3–5 October 2008, and featured four of the top nations in men's field hockey.

== Competition format ==
The tournament featured the national teams of Belgium, Malaysia, the Pakistan, and the hosts, Germany, competing in a round-robin format, with each team playing each other once. Three points were awarded for a win, one for a draw, and none for a loss.

Country	2008 FIH Ranking	Best World Cup finish	Best Olympic Games finish
Belgium	10	Eighth place (1973)	Third place (1920)
Germany	1	Champions (2002, 2006)	Champions (1992, 2008)
Malaysia	15	Fourth place (1975)	Eighth place (1972, 1976)
Pakistan	8	Champions (1971, 1978, 1982, 1994)	Champions (1960, 1968, 1984)

== Officials ==
The following umpires were appointed by the International Hockey Federation to officiate the tournament:

- Mubarik Ali (PAK)
- Fabian Bläsch (GER)
- Thomas Dumon (BEL)
- Hamish Jamson (ENG)
- Iskandar Rusli (MAS)

== Results ==
All times are local (Central European Summer Time).

=== Pool ===
Pos	Team	Pld	W	D	L	GF	GA	GD	Pts	Result
1	Germany (H)	3	2	1	0	10	3	+7	7	Tournament Champion
2	Malaysia	3	1	2	0	9	5	+4	5	
3	Pakistan	3	1	1	1	9	11	−2	4	
4	Belgium	3	0	0	3	6	15	−9	0	

Source: Deutscher Hockey-Bund
Rules for classification: 1) Points; 2) Goal difference; 3) Goals scored; 4) Games won; 5) Head-to-head.
(H) Hosts

=== Fixtures ===
3 October 2008
10:30

Pakistan	6–3	Belgium
Rasool 10'; Ali 28', 70'; Zubair 39'; Khan 48'; Imran 67'	Report	Boon 25'; Boccard 53'; Gucassoff 65'

Umpires:
Iskandar Rusli (MAS)
Fabian Bläsch (GER)

3 October 2008
15:30

Germany	1–1	Malaysia
Fürste 26'	Report	Selvaraju 46'

Umpires:
Thomas Dumon (BEL)
Mubarik Ali (PAK)

4 October 2008
13:00

Malaysia	2–2	Pakistan
Rahim 4'; Azlan 52'	Report	Abbasi 50'; Khan 57'

Umpires:
Fabian Bläsch (GER)
Thomas Dumon (BEL)

4 October 2008
15:30

Germany	3–1	Belgium
Lietz 34'; Deecke 39'; Wösch 48'	Report	Gucassoff 35'

Umpires:
Hamish Jamson (ENG)
Iskandar Rusli (MAS)

5 October 2008
12:00

Malaysia	6–2	Belgium
Rahim 5', 51'; Kelvinder 9'; Ismail 31'; Sallehin 41'; Azlan 51'	Report	Boccard 37'; De Paeuw 56'

Umpires:
Mubarik Ali (PAK)
Fabian Bläsch (GER)

5 October 2008
14:30

Pakistan	1–6	Germany
Abbasi 68'	Report	Häner 34'; Menke 38'; Rabente 46'; Lietz 52', 60'; Biederlack 70'

Umpires:
Thomas Dumon (BEL)
Hamish Jamson (ENG)

== Statistics ==
=== Final standings ===
1. Germany
2. Malaysia
3. Pakistan
4. Belgium

=== Goalscorers ===
There were 34 goals scored in 6 matches, for an average of 5.67 goals per match.

3 goals

- (Germany) Tobias Lietz
- (Malaysia) Amin Rahim

2 goals

- (Belgium) Gauthier Boccard
- (Belgium) Gregory Gucassoff
- (Malaysia) Azlan Misron
- (Pakistan) Shakeel Abbasi
- (Pakistan) Kashif Ali
- (Pakistan) Abdul Haseem Khan

1 goal

- (Belgium) Tom Boon
- (Belgium) Alexandre de Paeuw
- (Germany) Sebastian Biederlack
- (Germany) Oskar Deecke
- (Germany) Moritz Fürste
- (Germany) Martin Häner
- (Germany) Christoph Menke
- (Germany) Jan-Philipp Rabente
- (Germany) Florian Wösch
- (Malaysia) Ismail Abu
- (Malaysia) Sallehin Ghani
- (Malaysia) Selvaraju Sandrakasi
- (Malaysia) Kelvinder Singh
- (Pakistan) Muhammad Imran
- (Pakistan) Shafqat Rasool
- (Pakistan) Muhammad Zubair
