= 2006 Men's Hockey Hamburg Masters =

Tournament details
- Host country: Germany
- City: Hamburg
- Teams: 4
- Venue: Uhlenhorster HC

Final positions
- Champions: Netherlands (2nd title)
- Runner-up: Spain
- Third place: Pakistan

Tournament statistics
- Matches played: 6
- Goals scored: 37 (6.17 per match)
- Top scorer(s): (Pakistan) Sohail Abbas (Spain) Pol Amat (Spain) Eduardo Tubau (4 goals)

The 2006 Men's Hockey Hamburg Masters was the twelfth edition of the Hamburg Masters, consisting of a series of test matches. It was held in Hamburg, Germany, from 25 to 27 August 2006, and featured four of the top nations in men's field hockey.

== Competition format ==
The tournament featured the national teams of the Netherlands, Pakistan, Spain, and the hosts, Germany, competing in a round-robin format, with each team playing each other once. Three points were awarded for a win, one for a draw, and none for a loss.

Country	2006 FIH Ranking	Best World Cup Finish	Best Olympic Games Finish
Germany	1	Champions (2002)	Champions (1992)
Netherlands	4	Champions (1973, 1990, 1998)	Champions (1996, 2000)
Pakistan	5	Champions (1971, 1978, 1982, 1994)	Champions (1960, 1968, 1984)
Spain	3	Runners-Up (1971, 1998)	Runners-Up (1980, 1996)

== Officials ==
The following umpires were appointed by the International Hockey Federation to officiate the tournament:

- Christian Bläsch (GER)
- Andrew Mair (SCO)
- Haider Rasool (IRE)
- Juan Requena (ESP)
- Rob ten Cate (NED)

== Results ==
All times are local (Central European Summer Time).

=== Pool ===
Pos	Team	Pld	W	D	L	GF	GA	GD	Pts	Result
1	Netherlands	3	3	0	0	13	6	+7	9	Tournament Champion
2	Spain	3	2	0	1	12	9	+3	6	
3	Pakistan	3	1	0	2	8	13	−5	3	
4	Germany (H)	3	0	0	3	4	9	−5	0	

Source: Deutscher Hockey-Bund
Rules for classification: 1) Points; 2) Goal difference; 3) Goals scored; 4) Games won; 5) Head-to-head.
(H) Hosts

=== Fixtures ===
25 August 2006
16:15

Germany	1–2	Pakistan
C. Zeller 35'	Report	Abbas 7'; Ahmed 39'

Umpires:
Juan Requena (ESP)
Andrew Mair (SCO)

25 August 2006
18:30

Netherlands	5–1	Spain
Klaver 19', 66'; Weusthof 29'; Reckers 41'; De Nooijer 68'	Report	Tubau 24'

Umpires:
Christian Bläsch (GER)
Haider Rasool (PAK)

26 August 2006
14:00

Netherlands	6–4	Pakistan
Reckers 16', 17'; Hofman 47', 68'; Delmee 56'; M. Brouwer 63'	Report	Abbas 27', 62', 69'; Butt 52'

Umpires:
Andrew Mair (SCO)
Christian Bläsch (GER)

26 August 2006
16:30

Spain	5–2	Germany
Quemada 17'; Freixa 20'; Amat 43', 44', 69'	Report	C. Zeller 5', 30'

Umpires:
Rob ten Cate (NED)
Haider Rasool (PAK)

27 August 2006
12:00

Spain	6–2	Pakistan
Tubau 35', 66', 68'; Freixa 41', 44'; Amat 60'	Report	Akbar 7'; Abbasi 18'

Umpires:
Christian Bläsch (GER)
Rob ten Cate (NED)

27 August 2006
14:30

Germany	1–2	Netherlands
Hentschel 64'	Report	Weusthof 8'; Klaver 54'

Umpires:
Andrew Mair (SCO)
Juan Requena (ESP)

== Statistics ==
=== Final standings ===
1. Netherlands
2. Spain
3. Pakistan
4. Germany

=== Goalscorers ===
There were 37 goals scored in 6 matches, for an average of 6.17 goals per match.

4 goals

- (Pakistan) Sohail Abbas
- (Spain) Pol Amat
- (Spain) Eduardo Tubau

3 goals

- (Germany) Christopher Zeller
- (Netherlands) Karel Klaver
- (Netherlands) Robert Reckers
- (Spain) Santiago Freixa

2 goals

- (Netherlands) Rogier Hofman
- (Netherlands) Roderick Weusthof

1 goal

- (Germany) Oliver Hentschel
- (Netherlands) Matthijs Brouwer
- (Netherlands) Jeroen Delmee
- (Netherlands) Teun de Nooijer
- (Pakistan) Shakeel Abbasi
- (Pakistan) Waseem Ahmed
- (Pakistan) Waqas Akbar
- (Pakistan) Rehan Butt
- (Spain) Pau Quemada
