= Saqlain =

Saqlain is a given name and surname. Notable people with the name include:

- Muhammad Saqlain (born 1978), Pakistani field hockey player
- Saqlain Mushtaq (born 1976), Pakistani cricketer
- Saqlain Sajib (born 1988), Bangladeshi cricketer
- Saqlain Amin (born 2000), Pakistani Next.js Engineer
