= Didar Singh =

Indian field hockey player

Personal information
- Nationality: Indian
- Born: 2 April 1964 (age 62)

Sport
- Sport: Field hockey

Didar Singh (born 2 April 1964) is an Indian field hockey player. He competed in the men's tournament at the 1992 Summer Olympics.
