= Mohan Jiwa =

Malaysian field hockey player (born 1981)

Personal information
- Nationality: Malaysian
- Born: 26 April 1981 (age 44)

Sport
- Sport: Field hockey

Mohan Jiwa (born 26 April 1981) is a Malaysian field hockey player. He competed in the men's tournament at the 2000 Summer Olympics.
