= Gregory Gucassoff =

Belgian field hockey player

Personal information
- Nationality: Belgian
- Born: 20 April 1985 (age 40) Anderlecht, Belgium

Sport
- Sport: Field hockey

Gregory Gucassoff (born 20 April 1985) is a Belgian field hockey player. He competed in the men's tournament at the 2008 Summer Olympics.
