= Tariq Aziz (field hockey, born 1984) =

Pakistani field hockey player (born 1984)

Personal information
- Nationality: Pakistani
- Born: 12 December 1984 (age 41)

Sport
- Sport: Field hockey

Tariq Aziz (born 12 December 1984) is a Pakistani field hockey player. He competed in the men's tournament at the 2004 Summer Olympics, where Pakistan finished in the fifth place. His only goal of that tournament came in Pakistan's 3–0 victory over India on 25 August 2004.
