= Syed Abbas Haider Bilgrami =

Pakistani field hockey player

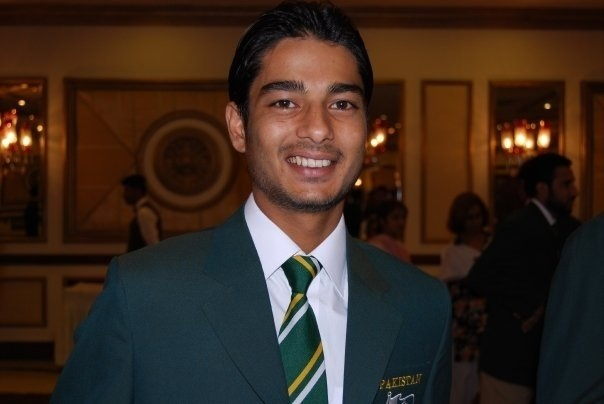
Abbas Haider in Olympics 2008 Beijing 2008

Syed Abbas Haider Bilgrami (born 26 October 1989) is a Pakistani hockey player who participated in the 2008 Summer Olympics in Beijing, China.
