= Dean Couzins =

New Zealand field hockey player

Personal information
- Born: Dean Warren Couzins; 9 June 1981 (age 45) Christchurch, New Zealand
Medal record
Men's field hockey
Representing New Zealand
Commonwealth Games
Silver medal – second place	2002 Manchester	Team competition
Bronze medal – third place	2010 Delhi	Team competition
Champions Challenge
Silver medal – second place	2007 Boom	Team competition

Dean Warren Couzins (born 9 June 1981) is a field hockey player from New Zealand, who earned his first cap for the national team, nicknamed The Black Sticks, in 2001 against Malaysia. The defender played the latter part of 2005 for Dutch club Breda, returning to join the NZ team for the Oceania Cup in November. Dean joined Dutch club SV Kampong in 2006–2007 helping them to a successful first year in the Dutch first league.

== International senior tournaments ==
- 2001 – World Cup Qualifier
- 2002 – World Cup
- 2002 – Commonwealth Games
- 2003 – Sultan Azlan Shah Cup
- 2003 – Champions Challenge
- 2004 – Olympic Qualifier
- 2004 – Summer Olympics
- 2004 – Champions Trophy
- 2005 – Sultan Azlan Shah Cup
- 2006 – Commonwealth Games
- 2006 – World Cup
- 2007 – Champions Challenge
- 2008 – Olympic Games
- 2012 – Olympic Games
