= Shea McAleese =

New Zealand field hockey player

Shea McAleese OLY
Personal information
- Full name: Shea Joseph McAleese
- Born: 7 August 1984 (age 42) Napier, New Zealand
- Height: 1.77 m (5 ft 10 in)
- Weight: 82 kg (181 lb)

Sport
- Sport: Field hockey
- Position: Midfielder
- Club: Central Falcons
Youth career
- Years: Team
- 2004–2005: Canterbury
Senior career
Years	Team	Caps	Goals
2005–2006	Canterbury	-	-
2006–2007	Tassie Tigers	-	-
2007–2009	Hamburg	-	-
2010–2011	Braxgata	-	-
2011–2012	Central Falcons	-	-
2012–2015	HGC	-	-
2015–2017	Braxgata	-	-
2017–	Central Falcons	-	-
National team
Years	Team	Caps	Goals
2005–2021	New Zealand	316	(34)
Medal record
Men's field hockey
Representing New Zealand
Commonwealth Games
Silver medal – second place	2018 Gold Coast	Team
Bronze medal – third place	2010 Delhi	Team
Oceania Cup
Silver medal – second place	2019 Rockhampton

Shea Joseph McAleese (born 7 August 1984) is a New Zealand field hockey player who competed in the 2008 Summer Olympics and 2012 Olympics. He was part of the New Zealand team that won the bronze medal at the 2010 Commonwealth Games.

Youngest son of Dan and Margie McAleese. Has an older brother and sister, Jonathan and Aimee.

Shea McAleese played at Uhlenhorster Hockey Club in Hamburg from 2007 till 2009. With the Team he won the Euro Hockey League 2007–2008. He also helped his team to a second-place finish in the competition in the 2008–2009 Season, when they were defeated by HC Bloemendaal of The Netherlands. He represents the Uttar Pradesh Wizards in the Hockey India League. He has also coached the Central Mavericks team in New Zealand.

In August 2021, Shea McAleese announced his retirement from International Hockey.
