= Richard Petherick =

New Zealand field hockey player

Richard Petherick (born 4 April 1986) is a field hockey player from New Zealand. While at Hamilton Boys' High School Petherick played for regional and national representative teams. He earned his first cap for the national men's team, nicknamed The Black Sticks, in 2005 against Malaysia. He also gained selection for both the Sultan Azlan Shah tournament in May and for the European tour in July.

Petherick travelled as a reserve to the 2008 Summer Olympics but did not compete. He competed for New Zealand at the 2012 Summer Olympics.

== International senior tournaments ==
- 2005 – Sultan Azlan Shah Cup
- 2006 – World Cup

== Life now ==
Petherick now teaches PE at Overseas Family School in Singapore
