= Muhammad Waqas (field hockey) =

Pakistani field hockey player (born 1984)

Personal information
- Born: 3 September 1984 (age 42) Sialkot, Pakistan
Medal record
Men's field hockey
Representing Pakistan
Asian Games
Gold medal – first place	2010 Guangzhou	Team
Bronze medal – third place	2006 Doha	Team
Champions Trophy
Silver medal – second place	2014 Bhubaneswar	Team
Bronze medal – third place	2012 Melbourne	Team
Asian Champions Trophy
Gold medal – first place	2012 Doha	Team
Silver medal – second place	2011 Ordos City

Muhammad Waqas Sharif (born 3 September 1984) is a Pakistani field hockey player. He plays as Right Out.

== Career ==
=== 2008 ===
Waqas was a member of the Pakistan team at the 2008 Summer Olympics in Beijing.

=== 2010 ===
Waqas was a member of the gold medal-winning team at the Asian Games in Guanzhou, China.

=== 2012 ===
Waqas was a member of the gold medal-winning team at the 2012 Asian Men's Hockey Champions Trophy in Doha, Qatar. Muhammad Waqas was top scorer in the tournament with 11 goals. He was part of Pakistan's 2012 Summer Olympic team.
