= Waqas Akbar =

Pakistani field hockey player (born 1988)

Personal information
- Nationality: Pakistan
- Born: 26 November 1988 (age 37)
- Height: 1.72 m (5 ft 8 in)
- Weight: 58 kg (128 lb)

Sport
- Sport: Field hockey

Waqas Akbar (born 26 November 1988) is a Pakistani field hockey player. He competed in the 2008 Summer Olympics.
