= Rajpal Singh =

Indian field hockey player

Personal information
- Born: 8 August 1983 (age 43)

Sport
- Sport: Field hockey
- Position: Halfback
Senior career
Years	Team	Caps	Goals
–	Marienburger SC	-	-
National team
Years	Team	Caps	Goals
–	India	147	(52)
Medal record
Men's field hockey
Representing India
Asian Games
Bronze medal – third place	2010 Guangzhou	Team
Asia Cup
Gold medal – first place	2007 Chennai	Team
Asian Champions Trophy
Gold medal – first place	2011 Ordos City
Commonwealth Games
Silver medal – second place	2010 Delhi	Team
Champions Challenge
Bronze medal – third place	2007 Belgium	Team
Bronze medal – third place	2009 Salta	Team
Sultan Azlan Shah Cup
Gold medal – first place	2010 Malaysia	Team

Rajpal Singh (born 8 August 1983) is a former captain of India national hockey team. He plays from the forward (front line) position. He is an Arjuna Award winner. He is a graduate from Chandigarh's SGGS Khalsa College and a product of Shivalik Public School. Rajpal Singh hogged the limelight with a sterling show at his first international outing at the 2001 Youth Asia Cup. India won the Cup at Ipoh, Malaysia, where he was the 'Player of the Tournament', with seven goals. Rajpal Singh was in the news before the home world cup, as he unitedly led his team's fight for its rights with the hockey administrators.

== Career ==
=== Beginning ===
Younger son of a retired policeman, Rajpal represented Chandigarh in Junior Nationals. After the Hobart Junior World Cup gold, he joined Indian Oil Corporation. A long wait for his senior debut ended when, under the tutelage of Rajinder Singh Jr., he travelled to the 2005 Sultan Azlan Shah Cup.

He succeeded Deepak Thakur at the right wing.

In fall 2007, he played in the German second division (2. Bundesliga) for Marienburger SC, Cologne. In the first round, he scored four times. With Adrian D'Souza, Bimal Lakra and William Xalco, there played four Indians for this club. Rajpal was one of many Indians in 2007 who played in Germany in preparation for the Olympic Games 2008 in China.

=== 2010 ===
==== FIH World Cup ====
He became captain of national team after replacing Sandeep Singh just before the FIH world cup 2010 in New Delhi but India finished 8th.

==== Sultan Azlan Shah Cup ====
Under the captaincy of Rajpal, the Indian team regained their title as they emerged joint winners along with Korea in a rain-affected final at the 19th edition of Sultan Azlan Shah Cup. In one of the group matches, the Indian team defeated the Australian team 4–3.

==== Commonwealth Games ====
Under his captaincy, the Indian team entered into semifinal of Commonwealth Games, Delhi after defeating Pakistan by 7–4. It persuaded against the England in the semifinals to be the first team to make sure of a medal for India in CWG Hockey history. But the final was a washout with India going down 8–0 against the mighty Australia.

==== Asian Hockey Champions Trophy ====
He captained the Indian team to the inaugural 2011 Asian Men's Hockey Champions Trophy, which India won by defeating arch-rivals Pakistan in the final.

But Rajpal was removed as the captain on 30 September and was replaced by goalkeeper Bharat Chhetri. It is believed that his demotion was imminent as he had led the team's revolt against the federation for giving meager rewards after the Champion's Trophy triumph.

== Premier Hockey League ==
Rajpal leads Chandigarh Dynamos in the PHL.

Rajpal, a PPS officer is currently serving in the Punjab Police as a Superintendent of Police.

== Personal life ==
He married Indian sport shooter Avneet Sidhu in 2013, and the couple have one child.

== World Series Hockey ==
Rajpal leads the Delhi Wizards in the WSH 2012.

== Awards ==
In 2011, Rajpal received the prestigious Arjuna Award for excellence in the field of hockey.
