= Brent Livermore =

Australian field hockey player

Personal information
- Full name: Brent James Livermore
- Born: 5 July 1976 (age 50) Grafton, New South Wales
- Height: 177 cm (5 ft 10 in)
- Weight: 74 kg (163 lb)
Medal record
Men's field hockey
Representing Australia
Olympic Games
Gold medal – first place	2004 Athens	Team
Bronze medal – third place	2000 Sydney	Team
World Cup
Silver medal – second place	2002 Kuala Lumpur	Team
Silver medal – second place	2006 Mönchengladbach	Team
Champions Trophy
Gold medal – first place	1999 Brisbane	Team
Gold medal – first place	2005 Chennai	Team
Gold medal – first place	2009 Melbourne	Team
Silver medal – second place	1997 Adelaide	Team
Silver medal – second place	2001 Rotterdam	Team
Silver medal – second place	2003 Amstelveen	Team
Silver medal – second place	2007 Kuala Lumpur	Team
Bronze medal – third place	1998 Lahore	Team
Commonwealth Games
Gold medal – first place	1998 Kuala Lumpur	Team
Gold medal – first place	2002 Manchester	Team
Gold medal – first place	2006 Melbourne	Team

Brent James Livermore OAM (born 5 July 1976 in Grafton, New South Wales) is a field hockey midfielder from Australia. He was first selected in the Australian team in 1997, and was awarded the Kookaburras player of the year award in 2001. He was also nominated of the FIH Player of the Year awards in 2002 and 2005. He has played over 300 matches for the Australian team, and has scored 30 international goals. He plays for the NSW Waratahs in the Australian Hockey League.

Brent Livermore won the gold medal with the Kooraburras at the 2004 Olympics, but was omitted from the 2008 Olympic squad that placed third in Beijing.

In the World Series Hockey organised by the Indian Hockey Federation and Nimbus Sport, Brent Livermore captains the Chennai Cheetahs, a Chennai-based Hockey team.

After a brief hiatus from the sport, Livermore returned to coach the NSWIS male team, the U21 NSW Men's team, and the NSW Waratahs team at their respective tournaments. He has returned to the pitch, as the captain-coach of team NSWIS, aged 42, in the exhibition match against Odisha. The team lost the first match 5–1.

== International tournaments ==
- 1997 – Champions Trophy, Adelaide (2nd place)
- 1998 – Commonwealth Games, Kuala Lumpur (1st place)
- 1998 – Champions Trophy, Lahore (3rd place)
- 1999 – Champions Trophy, Brisbane (1st place)
- 2000 – Champions Trophy, Amstelveen (5th place)
- 2000 – Olympic Games, Sydney (3rd place)
- 2001 – Champions Trophy, Rotterdam (2nd place)
- 2002 – World Cup, Kuala Lumpur (2nd place)
- 2002 – Commonwealth Games, Manchester (1st place)
- 2002 – Champions Trophy, Cologne (5th place)
- 2003 – Champions Trophy, Amstelveen (2nd place)
- 2004 – Olympic Games, Athens (1st place)
- 2005 – Champions Trophy, Chennai (1st place)
- 2006 – Commonwealth Games, Melbourne (1st place)
- 2006 – Champions Trophy, Terrassa (4th place)
- 2006 – World Cup, Mönchengladbach (2nd place)
- 2007 – Champions Trophy, Kuala Lumpur (2nd place)
- 2009 – Champions Trophy, Kuala Lumpur (1st place)
- 2018 – 2018 ODISHA XI vs NSWIS XI - Exhibition Tournament, Odisha (2nd place)
