= Adnan Maqsood =

Pakistani field hockey player

Personal information
- Nationality: Pakistani
- Born: 12 January 1979 (age 47)

Sport
- Sport: Field hockey

Adnan Maqsood (born 12 January 1979) is a Pakistani former field hockey player. He competed at the 2004 Summer Olympics and the 2008 Summer Olympics, playing in seven games for his country in the 2004 and six in the 2008 edition of Olympics.
