= Roderick Weusthof =

Dutch hockey player

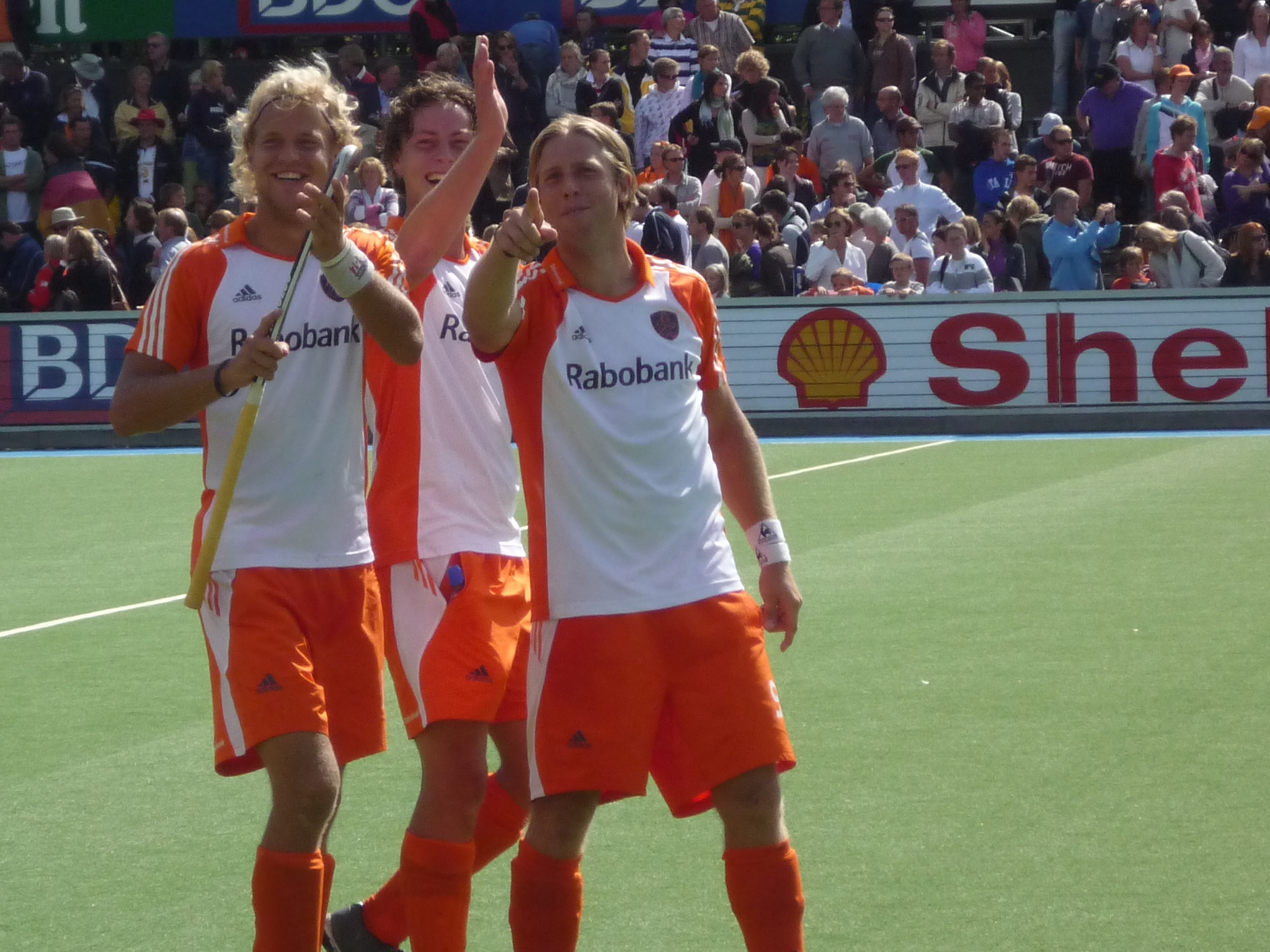
- Weusthof in 2009 (right).

Personal information
- Born: 18 May 1982 (age 44)

Sport
- Sport: Field hockey
Medal record
Men's field hockey
Representing the Netherlands
Olympic Games
| Silver medal – second place | 2012 London | Team |
European Championship
| Gold medal – first place | 2007 Manchester | Team |
| Silver medal – second place | 2005 Leipzig | Team |
| Silver medal – second place | 2011 Gladbach | Team |
Champions Trophy
| Gold medal – first place | 2006 Terrassa | Team |
| Silver medal – second place | 2004 Lahore | Team |
| Silver medal – second place | 2005 Chennai | Team |
| Bronze medal – third place | 2011 Auckland | Team |

Roderick Weusthof (born 18 May 1982 in Nijmegen) is a field hockey player from the Netherlands.

Weusthof was part of the Dutch national team for the 2004 Champions Trophy in Lahore where the Dutch won the silver medal. In 2005 in Chennai they won another silver medal at the same event as well as at the European Championships in Leipzig. His first international gold medal was won in Terrassa in 2007 at the Champions Trophy. In addition the next gold medal was at the 2007 European Championships in Manchester, but in between they performed under their standards at the World Championships in Mönchengladbach with only a seventh position. At the Champions League in 2008 in Rotterdam they finished fourth. He also is part of the Dutch team that qualified for the 2008 Summer Olympics and played in the 2012 Summer Olympics were the Netherlands won the silver medal.
