= Syed Imran Ali Warsi =

Pakistani field hockey player (born 1985)

Personal information
- Full name: Syed Imran Ali Warsi
- Nationality: Pakistani
- Born: 5 June 1985 (age 41) Karachi, Sindh, Pakistan

Sport
- Sport: Field hockey

Syed Imran Ali Warsi (born 5 June 1985) is a Pakistani field hockey player. He competed in the men's tournament at the 2008 Summer Olympics.
