= Luke Doerner =

Australian field hockey player

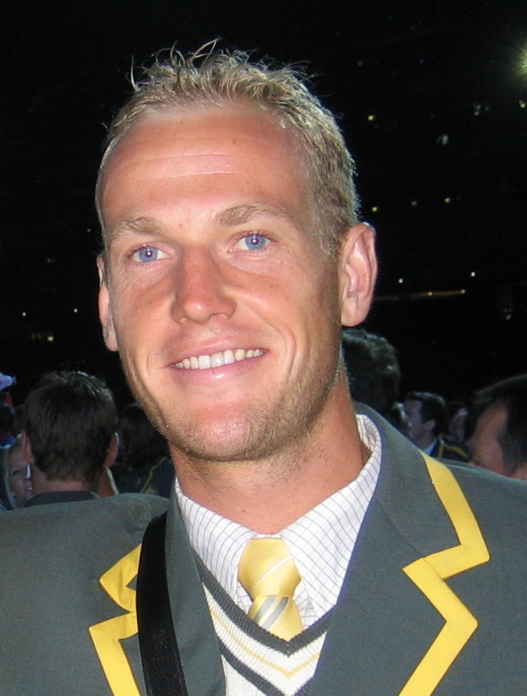

Personal information
- Nationality: Australian

Sport
- Country: Australia
- Sport: Field hockey
- Event: Men's team
- Team: Tassie Tigers
Medal record
Men's field hockey
Representing Australia
Olympic Games
Bronze medal – third place	2008 Beijing	Team
World Cup
Gold medal – first place	2010 New Delhi	Team
Silver medal – second place	2006 Mönchengladbach	Team
Champions Trophy
Gold medal – first place	2005 Chennai	Team
Gold medal – first place	2008 Rotterdam	Team
Gold medal – first place	2009 Melbourne	Team
Gold medal – first place	2010 Mönchengladbach	Team
Gold medal – first place	2011 Auckland	Team
Silver medal – second place	2007 Kuala Lumpur	Team
Commonwealth Games
Gold medal – first place	2006 Melbourne	Team
Gold medal – first place	2010 Delhi	Team

Luke Doerner is an Australian field hockey player. He plays for the Tassie Tigers in the Australian Hockey League. He is a member of the Australia men's national field hockey team, and won a gold medal at the 2010 Commonwealth Games. He is trying to secure a spot on the national team in order to represent Australia at the 2012 Summer Olympics. He represents the Uttar Pradesh Wizards in the Hockey India League.

== Field hockey ==
Doerner plays for the Tassie Tigers in the Australian Hockey League. He signed with and played for the team in 2011, competing in the first found of the 2011 season. Prior to 2011, he played for the Victorian team in the Australian Hockey League. Earlier, he played professional hockey in the Netherlands for HC Bloemendaal and Laren. In 2011, he played club hockey in Hobart.

Doerner gave teammate Matthew Swann a yellow headband that Swann wears at every match.

=== National team ===
Doerner is a member of the Australia men's national field hockey team. In 2006, he represented Australia at the Azlan Shah tournament in Malaysia. He competed in the 2007 Champions Trophy competition for Australia. In December 2007, he was a member of the Kookaburras squad that competed in the Dutch Series in Canberra. In January 2008, he was a member of the senior national team that competed at the Five Nations men's hockey tournament in South Africa. He won a bronze medal at the 2008 Summer Olympics. He scored a goal in the bronze medal game against the Netherlands in the country's 6–1 victory. He was a member of the 2009 Champions Trophy winning team, playing in the gold medal match against Germany that Australia won by a score of 5–3. New national team coach Ric Charlesworth named him a returning member, alongside fourteen total new players who had few than 10 national team caps to the squad before in April 2009 in a bid to ready the team for the 2010 Commonwealth Games.

In 2009, he represented the country on a tour of Europe. He competed in the third match of the tour against England where Australia won 5–4. He represented Australia at the 2010 Commonwealth Games. He was sent off with ten minutes left in the game against the Netherlands as a result of having earned two red cards. In the gold medal match against India that Australia won 8–0, he scored two goals. Overall, he was the competition's leading scorer with eight goals. In 2010, he won a gold medal at the World Cup. In the 2–1 victory in the gold medal round against Germany, he scored a goal in the fifty-ninth minute. Because of other commitments, he could not compete at the Azlan Shah Cup in Malaysia in May 2011. In December 2011, he was named as one of twenty-eight players to be on the 2012 Summer Olympics Australian men's national training squad. This squad will be narrowed in June 2012. He trained with the team from 18 January to mid-March in Perth, Western Australia. In February during the training camp, he played in a four nations test series with the teams being the Kookaburras, Australia A Squad, the Netherlands and Argentina. The competition was his first since returning from time away from the game as a result of injury. He played for Australia A Squad. In the series, his team beat Argentina 4-2 and he scored a goal in the match.
