= Grant Schubert =

Australian field hockey player

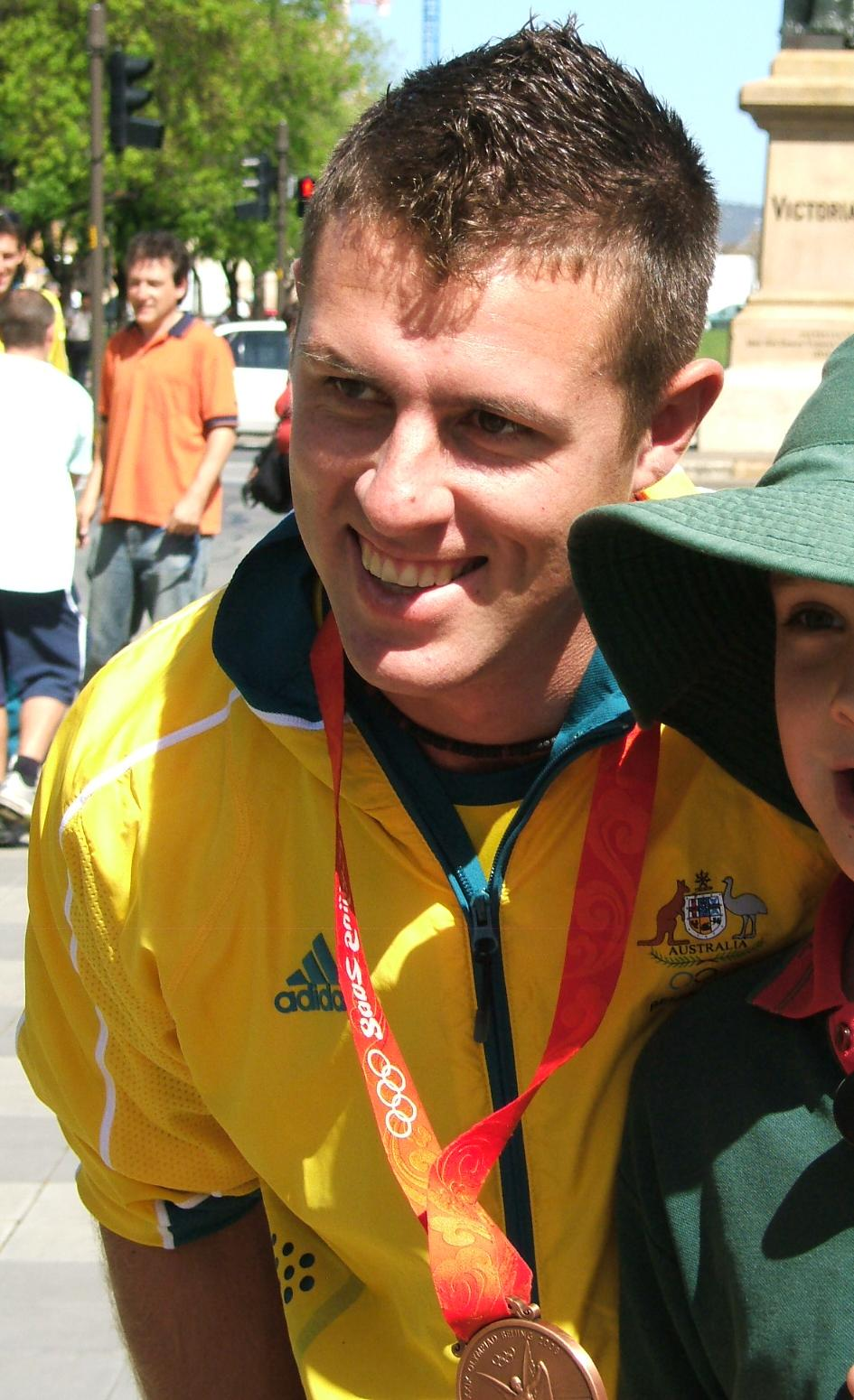

Personal information
- Nationality: Australian
- Born: 1 August 1980 (age 46)

Sport
- Country: Australia
- Sport: Field hockey
- Event: Men's team
Medal record
Men's field hockey
Representing Australia
Olympic Games
Gold medal – first place	2004 Athens	Team
Bronze medal – third place	2008 Beijing	Team
Champions Trophy
Gold medal – first place	2005 Chennai	Team
Gold medal – first place	2008 Rotterdam	Team
Gold medal – first place	2009 Melbourne	Team
Silver medal – second place	2003 Amstelveen	Team
Silver medal – second place	2007 Kuala Lumpur	Team
Commonwealth Games
Gold medal – first place	2006 Melbourne	Team
World Cup
Gold medal – first place	2010 New Delhi	Team

Grant Schubert (OAM) (born 1 August 1980 in Loxton, South Australia) is a field hockey striker from Australia, who won the gold medal with the Men's National Team at the 2004 Summer Olympics in Athens. He was named World Hockey Young Player of the Year by the International Hockey Federation (FIH) in December 2003.

Schubert now lives in Western Australia.

Schubert was honoured as the most promising player at the 2003 Champions Trophy with nine goals in six matches. Earlier that year, on 9 July, he made his debut for The Kookaburras in a friendly match against Germany in Neuss. He played club hockey in The Netherlands after the Athens Games, first for Kampong in Utrecht, and after the relegation for HC Klein Zwitserland in The Hague. He had to miss the 2006 Men's Hockey World Cup due to a knee injury. He also missed the 2008 Olympic Games semi-final and bronze medal play-off matches due to a knee injury sustained in the last minor round game vs Great Britain.

In 2006, Schubert represented Australia at the Azlan Shah tournament in Malaysia. He competed in the 2007 Champions Trophy competition for Australia. In January 2008, he was a member of the senior national team that competed at the Five Nations men's hockey tournament in South Africa. He represented Australia at the 2008 Summer Olympics, playing in the team's 6-1 victory over Canada and scoring the team's third goal.

New national team coach Ric Charlesworth named him, a returning member, alongside fourteen total new players who had few than 10 national team caps to the squad before in April 2009 in a bid to ready the team for the 2010 Commonwealth Games. In 2009, Schubert was a member of the national team during a five-game test series in Kuala Lumpur, Malaysia against Malaysia. He was a member of the 2009 Champions Trophy winning team, playing in the gold medal match against Germany that Australia won by a score of 5-3. In 2011, he had an Achilles tendon injury, which led to him to being removed from the Kookaburras squad for a while. In December 2011, he was named as one of fourteen players to be on the 2012 Summer Olympics Australian men's national Olympic development squad. While this squad is not in the top twenty-eight and separate from the Olympic training coach, the Australian coach Ric Charlesworth did not rule out selecting from only the training squad, with players from the Olympic development having a chance at possibly being called up to represent Australia at the Olympics. He trained with the team from 18 January to mid-March in Perth, Western Australia.

== International tournaments ==
- 2003 – Champions Trophy, Amstelveen (2nd place)
- 2004 – Olympic Games, Athens (1st place)
- 2005 – Champions Trophy, Chennai (1st place)
- 2005 – RaboTrophy, Amsterdam (2nd place)
- 2006 – Commonwealth Games, Melbourne (1st place)
- 2006 – Champions Trophy, Terrassa (4th place)
- 2007 – Champions Trophy, Kuala Lumpur (2nd place)
- 2008 – Olympic Games, Beijing (3rd place)
- 2008 – Champions Trophy, Rotterdam (1st place)
- 2009 – Champions Trophy, Melbourne (1st place)
- 2010 - FIH World Cup, New Delhi (1st place)

Awards
Preceded by (Australia) Jamie Dwyer	WorldHockey Young Player of the Year; 2003	Succeeded by (Spain) Santi Freixa
