= Muhammad Zubair (field hockey) =

Pakistani field hockey player (born 1988)

Medal record

Men's field hockey

Representing Pakistan

Asian Games
Gold medal – first place	2010 Guangzhou	Team
Bronze medal – third place	2006 Doha	Team

Asia Cup
Bronze medal – third place	2013 Ipoh	Team

Asian Champions Trophy
Gold medal – first place	2018 Muscat	Team

Muhammad Zubair (born 12 October 1988) is a Pakistani field hockey player who plays for the Pakistan national team as a forward.

== Career ==
=== 2010 ===
In November, Zubair was part of the gold medal-winning team at the Asian Games in Guangzhou, China.

== See also ==
- Pakistan national field hockey team
