= Muhammad Saqlain =

Pakistani field hockey player (born 1978)

Mohammed Saqlain
Personal information
- Full name: Muhammad Saqlain
- Born: 23 February 1978 (age 48) Lahore, Punjab, Pakistan

Sport
- Sport: Field hockey
- Position: midfielder
- Club: Allied Bank Limited
Senior career
Years	Team	Caps	Goals
1996–present	ABL	-	-
National team
Years	Team	Caps	Goals
1998–present	Pakistan	200	(32)

Muhammad Saqlain
Medal record

Men's field hockey

Representing Pakistan

Commonwealth Games
Silver medal – second place	2006 Melbourne	Team
Bronze medal – third place	2002 Manchester	Team

Champions Trophy
Silver medal – second place	1998 Lahore	Team
Bronze medal – third place	2002 Cologne	Team
Bronze medal – third place	2003 Amstelveen	Team
Bronze medal – third place	2004 Lahore	Team

Asia Cup
Silver medal – second place	1999 Kuala Lumpur	Team
Silver medal – second place	2003 Kuala Lumpur	Team

Muhammad Saqlain is an international field hockey player from Pakistan. He plays Centre half. He made his international debut in 1998.

== Career ==
=== 2006 ===
He was a member of the silver-medal-winning Pakistan team at the 2006 Commonwealth Games in Melbourne, Australia.

=== 2008 ===
Saqlain was part of the squad which placed 8th at the Beijing Olympics in 2008.

== Personal life ==
Saqlain hails from a family of athletes. His brother, Zia Sabtain, played as a footballer at the domestic level. Another brother, Tanveer ul Hasnain, was part of the Pakistan national football team which won the gold medal at the 1991 South Asian Games. A third brother, Imamuddin, is a pole vaulter who represented Pakistan at the 1986 Asian Games.

== See also ==
Pakistan national field hockey team
