= Muhammad Imran (field hockey) =

Pakistani field hockey player

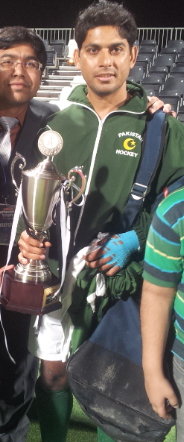

Medal record

Men's field hockey

Asian Games
Gold medal – first place	2010 Guangzhou	Team
Silver medal – second place	2014 Incheon	Team

Asia Cup
Bronze medal – third place	2013 Ipoh	Team

Asian Champions Trophy
Gold medal – first place	2012 Doha	
Gold medal – first place	2013 Kakamigahara	
Silver medal – second place	2011 Ordos City	

Champions Trophy
Silver medal – second place	2014 Bhubaneswar	Team
Bronze medal – third place	2004 Lahore	Team
Bronze medal – third place	2012 Melbourne	Team

Muhammad Imran (born 12 January 1979) is a former Pakistani field hockey player who played as a full back and captained the Pakistan national team.

== Career ==
=== 2012 ===
In December, he captained the gold medal winning team at the 2012 Asian Champions Trophy in Doha, Qatar.

=== 2014 ===
In September, he captained the silver medal winning team at the Asian Games in Incheon, South Korea.

=== 2015 ===
Pakistan's hockey team failed to qualify for the 2016 Olympic Games while Muhammad Imran was the captain of the team. Since 1948, it was the first time that Pakistan's hockey team had not played in the mega-event.
