= Men's field hockey Qualifying Tournaments for the 2008 Summer Olympics =

Qualifying Tournaments for the 2008 Summer Olympics
Tournament details
- Dates: 2 February – 13 April 2008
- Teams: 18 (from 4 confederations)
- Venue: 3 (in 3 host cities)

Tournament statistics
- Matches played: 54
- Goals scored: 341 (6.31 per match)
- Top scorer: (Chile) Felipe Montegu (11 goals)

The Men's field hockey Qualifying Tournament for the 2008 Summer Olympics were qualification tournaments to determine the final three spots for the 2008 Summer Olympics. The qualifying tournaments, which involved 18 teams divided into three groups, with three separate qualifying tournaments, were held in New Zealand, Chile and Japan, at different times in 2008. Only the winners of each qualifying tournament earned a berth in the 2008 Summer Olympics.

== Teams ==
Below is the list of 18 teams who participated in these qualifying tournaments:

Date	Event	Location	Quotas	Qualifier(s)
4–14 December 2006	2006 Asian Games	Doha, Qatar	3	Japan; India; Malaysia; ~~Bangladesh~~ (Note: Withdrew and was replaced by Russia)
14–22 July 2007	2007 African Olympic Qualifier	Nairobi, Kenya	0	~~Egypt~~ (Note: Withdrew and was replaced by Mexico)
15–25 July 2007	2007 Pan American Games	Rio de Janeiro, Brazil	3	Argentina; Chile; Trinidad and Tobago; ~~Cuba~~ (Note: Withdrew and was replaced by the United States)
19–26 August 2007	2007 EuroHockey Championship	Manchester, England	4	Germany; Great Britain; France; Ireland; ~~Czech Republic~~ (Note: Withdrew and was replaced by Italy)
9–16 September 2007	2007 EuroHockey Nations Trophy	Lisbon, Portugal	3	Switzerland; Austria; Poland
11–16 September 2007	2007 Oceania Cup	Buderim, Australia	1	New Zealand

In addition, International Hockey Federation also named four reserve teams after four of the above teams are failed to make it in this qualifying tournament, two of them already confirmed to be in the reserve list:

1. United States (replace Cuba in Qualifying 1)
2. Mexico (replace Egypt in Qualifying 2)
3. Russia (replace Bangladesh in Qualifying 2)
4. Italy (replace Czech Republic in Qualifying 3)

== Qualifying 1 ==
Olympic Qualifier New Zealand
Tournament details
- Host country: New Zealand
- City: North Shore City
- Dates: 2–10 February 2008
- Teams: 6 (from 3 confederations)
- Venue: Crown Relocations Stadium

Final positions
- Champions: New Zealand
- Runner-up: Argentina
- Third place: France

Tournament statistics
- Matches played: 18
- Goals scored: 109 (6.06 per match)
- Top scorer: (Ireland) Mark Gleghorne (9 goals)
- Best player: (New Zealand) Blair Hopping

=== Pool ===
Pos	Team	Pld	W	D	L	GF	GA	GD	Pts	Qualification
1	New Zealand (H)	5	4	0	1	22	4	+18	12	Final
2	Argentina	5	4	0	1	23	6	+17	12	Final
3	Ireland	5	4	0	1	21	5	+16	12	Third place game
4	France	5	2	0	3	14	16	−2	6	Third place game
5	United States	5	1	0	4	9	30	−21	3	Fifth place game
6	Trinidad and Tobago	5	0	0	5	7	35	−28	0	Fifth place game

(H) Hosts

=== Results ===
All times are New Zealand Summer Time (UTC+13)

2 February 2008
12:00

France	0 – 4	Ireland
		Gleghorne 7'; Jermyn 40'; Watt 55', 69'

Umpires:
Rob ten Cate (NED)
David Leiper (GBR)

2 February 2008
14:00

New Zealand	12 – 0	Trinidad and Tobago
H. Shaw 9'; Kosoof 11', 22', 32', 49'; Child 14', 34', 61', 64'; Burrows 28', 69'; Archibald 57'

Umpires:
Xavier Adell (ESP)
Daniel Lopez (URU)

2 February 2008
16:00

Argentina	9 – 1	United States
L. Vila 1', 25', 39'; Garreta 16'; Almada 33', 64'; M. Vila 35'; Rossi 40'; Zylberberg 70'		Coolidge 70'

Umpires:
Tim Pullman (AUS)
Nigel Iggo (NZL)

3 February 2008
13:15

New Zealand	3 – 1	Ireland
Kosoof 25'; Collier 26', 45'		Gleghorne 16'

Umpires:
Tim Pullman (AUS)
Rob ten Cate (NED)

3 February 2008
15:15

United States	4 – 7	France
Martin 1'; Harris 6'; Coolidge 37'; Sheridan 43'		Soyez 24', 26', 41', 48', 52'; Branquard 51'; Gouedard Comte 70'

Umpires:
Chris Wilson (CAN)
Xavier Adell (ESP)

3 February 2008
17:15

Argentina	7 – 1	Trinidad and Tobago
R. Vila 3'; M. Vila 21', 68'; Rossi 27'; L. Vila 31', 43'; Zylberberg 59'		Toussaint 62'

Umpires:
David Leiper (GBR)
Zulfiqar Haider (PAK)

5 February 2008
14:00

Ireland	7 – 2	Trinidad and Tobago
Maguire 8'; Gleghorne 14', 37'; Magee 18'; Jermyn 48'; Hobbs 65'; Gormley 68'		James 35'; Wren 36'

Umpires:
Rob ten Cate (NED)
Xavier Adell (ESP)

5 February 2008
16:00

France	2 – 4	Argentina
Gaillard 4'; Soyez 58'		L. Vila 14'; R. Vila 18'; Garreta 32'; Cammareri 59'

Umpires:
Nigel Iggo (NZL)
Chris Wilson (CAN)

5 February 2008
18:00

United States	0 – 4	New Zealand
		Burrows 9', 51'; Child 35'; H. Shaw 47'

Umpires:
Daniel Lopez (URU)
Tim Pullman (AUS)

6 February 2008
14:00

Trinidad and Tobago	2 – 5	France
Legerton 9'; Wren 57'		Genestet 2'; Soyez 28'; Durchon 34', 40'; Branquard 69'

Umpires:
Daniel Lopez (URU)
Chris Wilson (CAN)

6 February 2008
16:00

New Zealand	1 – 3	Argentina
Collier 63'		Cammareri 16'; R. Vila 23', 58'

Umpires:
David Leiper (GBR)
Xavier Adell (ESP)

6 February 2008
18:00

Ireland	8 – 0	United States
Magee 8'; Gleghorne 15', 28', 40', 43', 70'; Barbour 37'; Gormley 46'

Umpires:
Zulfiqar Haider (PAK)
Tim Pullman (AUS)

9 February 2008
10:15

Trinidad and Tobago	2 – 4	United States
Toussaint 14'; Browne 19'		Harris 29'; Sheridan 42', 48'; Martin 66'

Umpires:
Nigel Iggo (NZL)
Zulfiqar Haider (PAK)

9 February 2008
12:15

Argentina	0 – 1	Ireland
		Gormley 55'

Umpires:
Tim Pullman (AUS)
David Leiper (GBR)

9 February 2008
14:15

France	0 – 2	New Zealand
		Archibald 13'; Burrows 14'

Umpires:
Daniel Lopez (URU)
Rob ten Cate (NED)

==== Fifth and sixth ====
10 February 2008
09:45

United States	2 – 3	Trinidad and Tobago
Harris 29'; Martin 32'		Legerton 21'; Whittington 41'; Quan Chan 68'

Umpires:
Daniel Lopez (URU)
Tim Pullman (AUS)

==== Third and fourth ====
10 February 2008
12:15

Ireland	1 – 2	France
Barbour 43'		Durchon 64'; Soyez 69'

Umpires:
Chris Wilson (CAN)
Rob ten Cate (NED)

==== Final ====
10 February 2008
14:45

New Zealand	3 – 2 (a.e.t.)	Argentina
Kosoof 49'; H. Shaw 65'; B. Shaw 85'		L. Vila 24'; M. Vila 65'

Umpires:
David Leiper (GBR)
Xavier Adell (ESP)

=== Awards ===
Fair Play Trophy	Best Goalkeeper	Top Goalscorer	Best Player
France	(Argentina) Juan Manuel Vivaldi	(Ireland) Mark Gleghorne	(New Zealand) Blair Hopping

=== Final standings ===
Rank	Team
Gold medal	New Zealand
Silver medal	Argentina
Bronze medal	France
4	Ireland
5	United States
6	Trinidad and Tobago

Qualified for the Summer Olympics

== Qualifying 2 ==
Olympic Qualifier Chile
Tournament details
- Host country: Chile
- City: Santiago
- Dates: 1–9 March 2008
- Teams: 6 (from 3 confederations)
- Venue: Prince of Wales Country Club

Final positions
- Champions: Great Britain
- Runner-up: India
- Third place: Russia

Tournament statistics
- Matches played: 18
- Goals scored: 135 (7.5 per match)
- Top scorer: (Chile) Felipe Montregu (11 goals)
- Best player: (India) Prabhjot Singh

=== Pool ===
Pos	Team	Pld	W	D	L	GF	GA	GD	Pts	Qualification
1	Great Britain	5	5	0	0	30	3	+27	15	Final
2	India	5	4	0	1	39	8	+31	12	Final
3	Austria	5	3	0	2	15	19	−4	9	Third place game
4	Russia	5	2	0	3	15	23	−8	6	Third place game
5	Chile (H)	5	1	0	4	10	14	−4	3	Fifth place game
6	Mexico	5	0	0	5	3	45	−42	0	Fifth place game

Source: FIH
(H) Hosts

=== Results ===
All times are Chile Summer Time (UTC-3)

1 March 2008
14:30

Great Britain	11 – 0	Mexico
S. Mantell 13', 51'; R. Mantell 23'; Dick 47'; Alexander 50'; Middleton 54'; Daly 57', 68'; Moore 61'; Jackson 63'; Tindall 70'	Report

Umpires:
John Wright (RSA)
Gus Soteriades (USA)

1 March 2008
16:30

India	8 – 0	Russia
D. Tirkey 14'; P. Singh 19', 29', 65'; S. Singh 30'; Khandekar 36'; S. Singh 45'; Raghunath 54'	Report

Umpires:
Henrik Ehlers (DEN)
Marc Knulle (FRA)

1 March 2008
19:00

Chile	3 – 4	Austria
Montegu 1', 46', 64'	Report	Jelinek 20'; Tobias Hübner 32'; Stremitzer 42'; Stanzl 44'

Umpires:
Colin Hutchinson (IRL)
Raghu Prasad (IND)

2 March 2008
16:00

Great Britain	8 – 0	Russia
Middleton 7', 37'; Kirkham 11', 65'; Daly 25', 46'; Ralph 31'; Tindall 41'	Report

Umpires:
Henrik Ehlers (DEN)
Colin Hutchinson (IRL)

2 March 2008
18:00

Mexico	0 – 4	Chile
	Report	Montegu 29', 46', 70'; Amoroso 68'

Umpires:
Raghu Prasad (IND)
Marc Knulle (FRA)

2 March 2008
20:00

Austria	3 – 7	India
Buchta 2'; Minar 28', 60'	Report	D. Tirkey 9', 23'; I. Tirkey 41'; S. Singh 51', 55'; Bharath 53'; R. Singh 53'

Umpires:
John Wright (RSA)
Richmond Attipoe (GHA)

4 March 2008
15:30

Mexico	1 – 18	India
Moreno Quiroz 70'	Report	P. Singh 9', 50', 60', 61'; R. Singh 11', 21', 30', 39', 69'; S. Singh 16', 24'; Khandekar 19'; Raghunath 29', 37', 54', 57', 62'; S. Singh 65'

Umpires:
Colin Hutchinson (IRL)
Richard Attipoe (GHA)

4 March 2008
17:30

Austria	5 – 4	Russia
Körper 28', 59'; Kolinek 49'; Proksch 53', 65'	Report	Azarov 23', 52'; Mamoshkin 25'; Korolyov 67'

Umpires:
Gus Soteriades (USA)
Raghu Prasad (IND)

4 March 2008
19:30

Chile	1 – 4	Great Britain
Krainz 47'	Report	R. Mantell 42'; Middleton 50'; Tindall 56', 66'

Umpires:
John Wright (RSA)
Henrik Ehlers (DEN)

6 March 2008
14:00

India	2 – 3	Great Britain
Raghunath 3', 64'	Report	R. Mantell 15'; Clarke 45'; Moore 69'

Umpires:
John Wright (RSA)
Henrik Ehlers (DEN)

6 March 2008
17:30

Austria	3 – 1	Mexico
Körper 6', 64'; Stanzl 55'	Report	Aguilar Montoya 12'

Umpires:
Colin Hutchinson (IRL)
Marc Knulle (FRA)

6 March 2008
19:30

Russia	2 – 1	Chile
Mokrousov 48'; Azarov 68'	Report	Stein 65'

Umpires:
Richmond Attipoe (GHA)
Gus Soteriades (USA)

8 March 2008
15:00

Great Britain	4 – 0	Austria
Tindall 5'; Jackson 12'; R. Mantell 22'; Moore 69'	Report

Umpires:
Henrik Ehlers (DEN)
Gus Soteriades (USA)

8 March 2008
17:00

Russia	9 – 1	Mexico
Azarov 2', 26'; Platonov 9'; Mayorov 18'; Nikolaev 32'; Lykov 46'; Korolyov 51'; Spishkovsky 55'; Volkov 62'	Report	Moreno Quiroz 39'

Umpires:
Raghu Prasad (IND)
Richmond Attipoe (GHA)

8 March 2008
19:00

Chile	1 – 4	India
Montegu 64'	Report	P. Singh 9'; Raghunath 23', 61'; Bharath 24'

Umpires:
John Wright (RSA)
Colin Hutchinson (IRL)

==== Fifth and sixth ====
9 March 2008
13:00

Chile	9 – 3	Mexico
Montegu 9', 16', 28', 58'; Casanova 14'; Krainz 21', 49'; Stein 38'; Krussig 52'	Report	Aguilar Montoya 10', 67'; Borquez Silva 35'

Umpires:
Marc Knulle (FRA)
Gus Soteriades (USA)

==== Third and fourth ====
9 March 2008
15:30

Austria	3 – 6	Russia
Proksch 18'; Buchta 49'; Stanzl 65'	Report	Platonov 1', 23', 31', 61'; Azarov 6'; Korolyov 58'

Umpires:
Colin Hutchinson (IRL)
Richmond Attipoe (GHA)

==== Final ====
9 March 2008
18:00

Great Britain	2 – 0	India
Middleton 4'; R. Mantell 10'	Report

Umpires:
John Wright (RSA)
Henrik Ehlers (DEN)

=== Awards ===
Best Player	Best Goalkeeper	Top Goalscorer	Fair Play Trophy
(India) Prabhjot Singh	(Mexico) Moises Alejandro Vargas Garcia	(Chile) Felipe Montegu	Austria

=== Final standings ===
Rank	Team
Gold medal	Great Britain
Silver medal	India
Bronze medal	Russia
4	Austria
5	Chile
6	Mexico

Qualified for the Summer Olympics

== Qualifying 3 ==
Olympic Qualifier Japan
Tournament details
- Host country: Japan
- City: Kakamigahara
- Dates: 5–13 April 2008
- Teams: 6 (from 2 confederations)
- Venue: Gifu Prefectural Green Stadium

Final positions
- Champions: Germany
- Runner-up: Japan
- Third place: Malaysia

Tournament statistics
- Matches played: 18
- Goals scored: 97 (5.39 per match)
- Top scorer: (Germany) Christopher Zeller (9 goals)
- Best player: (Germany) Timo Weß

=== Pool ===
Pos	Team	Pld	W	D	L	GF	GA	GD	Pts	Qualification
1	Germany	5	5	0	0	30	0	+30	15	Final
2	Japan (H)	5	3	1	1	16	10	+6	10	Final
3	Malaysia	5	2	2	1	13	14	−1	8	Third place game
4	Poland	5	2	0	3	11	15	−4	6	Third place game
5	Switzerland	5	1	0	4	10	19	−9	3	Fifth place game
6	Italy	5	0	1	4	5	27	−22	1	Fifth place game

(H) Hosts

=== Results ===
All times are Japan Standard Time (UTC+9)

5 April 2008
12:05

Germany	8 – 0	Italy
Draguhn 11', 30'; C. Zeller 24', 25', 38'; Witthaus 40', 55'; B. Weß 68'

Umpires:
Marcelo Servetto (ESP)
Chen Dekang (CHN)

5 April 2008
14:05

Malaysia	2 – 1	Poland
Tg Abdul Jalil 39', 58'		Rachwalski 20'

Umpires:
Murray Grime (AUS)
Kim Hong-Lee (KOR)

5 April 2008
16:05

Switzerland	1 – 2	Japan
Kloter 40'		Katayama 42'; Yamabori 61'

Umpires:
Hamish Jamson (GBR)
Deon Nel (RSA)

6 April 2008
13:05

Switzerland	0 – 10	Germany
		Witthaus 8', 31'; T. Weß 9', 38', 65'; B. Weß 14'; Witte 32'; Keller 42', 45', 59'

Umpires:
Satoshi Kondo (JPN)
Murray Grime (AUS)

6 April 2008
15:05

Japan	6 – 1	Poland
A. Ito 23'; Yoshida 35'; Katayama 45'; Anai 52'; Yamabori 60'; Sakamoto 63'		Dutkiewicz 11'

Umpires:
Kim Hong-Lee (KOR)
Deon Nel (RSA)

6 April 2008
17:05

Italy	4 – 4	Malaysia
Nanni 23'; Lunetta 44'; Malta 64'; Lanzano 66'		Abdullah 35', 70'; Rahim 45'; Mohan 58'

Umpires:
German Montes de Oca (ARG)
Chen Dekang (CHN)

8 April 2008
13:00

Poland	3 – 2	Switzerland
Strykowski 38'; Dutkiewicz 51'; T. Choczaj 67'		Keller 11'; Gähwiler 20'

Umpires:
Hamish Jamson (GBR)
Kim Hong-Lee (KOR)

8 April 2008
15:00

Japan	5 – 1	Italy
Yamabori 12', 21', 31'; Katayama 57'; Furusato 65'		Lanzano 28'

Umpires:
Deon Nel (RSA)
German Montes de Oca (ARG)

8 April 2008
17:00

Germany	3 – 0	Malaysia
C. Zeller 23'; Korn 43'; T. Weß 58'

Umpires:
Marcelo Servetto (ESP)
Satoshi Kondo (JPN)

10 April 2008
12:00

Malaysia	4 – 3	Switzerland
Abd Rahim 15', 67'; Chua Boon Huat 35'; Makbul Singh 41'		Gähwiler 15', 64'; Keller 70+'

Umpires:
Murray Grime (AUS)
Chen Dekang (CHN)

10 April 2008
14:00

Italy	0 – 6	Poland
		T. Choczaj 16'; Górny 26'; Strykowski 33', 67'; Marcinkowski 37'; Grotowski 63'

Umpires:
Marcelo Servetto (ESP)
Satoshi Kondo (JPN)

10 April 2008
16:00

Germany	4 – 0	Japan
P. Zeller 21'; Fürste 49'; C. Zeller 62', 65'

Umpires:
Hamish Jamson (GBR)
German Montes de Oca (ARG)

12 April 2008
13:05

Poland	0 – 5	Germany
		T. Weß 11'; Korn 29'; C. Zeller 35'; Fürste 64'; Witthaus 67'

Umpires:
German Montes de Oca (ARG)
Marcelo Servetto (ESP)

12 April 2008
15:05

Japan	3 – 3	Malaysia
A. Ito 21'; Ono 35'; Katayama 69'		Chua Boon Huat 10'; Mohan 28'; Makbul Singh 33'

Umpires:
Hamish Jamson (GBR)
Murray Grime (AUS)

12 April 2008
17:05

Switzerland	4 – 0	Italy
Spörri 25', 33', 69'; Gähwiler 44'

Umpires:
Chen Dekang (CHN)
Kim Hong-Lae (KOR)

==== Fifth and sixth ====
13 April 2008
09:00

Switzerland	2 – 3	Italy
Keller 50'; Spörri 58'		Lanzano 25', 60'; Nunez 48'

Umpires:
Satoshi Kondo (JPN)
Deon Nel (RSA)

==== Third and fourth ====
13 April 2008
11:30

Malaysia	3 – 0	Poland
Tg Abdul Jalil 26', 69'; Rahim 53'

Umpires:
Marcelo Servetto (ESP)
Kim Hong-Lee (KOR)

==== Final ====
13 April 2008
14:00

Germany	4 – 0	Japan
Keller 16'; C. Zeller 39', 47'; Draguhn 68'

Umpires:
Hamish Jamson (GBR)
Murray Grime (AUS)

=== Awards ===
Top Goalscorer	Best Player	Best Goalkeeper	Fair Play Trophy
(Germany) Christopher Zeller	(Germany) Timo Weß	(Malaysia) Kumar Subramaniam	Italy

=== Final standings ===
Rank	Team
Gold medal	Germany
Silver medal	Japan
Bronze medal	Malaysia
4	Poland
5	Italy
6	Switzerland

Qualified for the Summer Olympics
