= 2002 Men's Hockey World Cup =

2002 Hockey World Cup
Hoki Piala Dunia 2002
- Official logo

Tournament details
- Host country: Malaysia
- City: Kuala Lumpur
- Dates: 24 February – 9 March
- Teams: 16 (from 5 confederations)
- Venue: Malaysia National Hockey Stadium

Final positions
- Champions: Germany (1st title)
- Runner-up: Australia
- Third place: Netherlands

Tournament statistics
- Matches played: 72
- Goals scored: 300 (4.17 per match)
- Top scorer(s): (Argentina) Jorge Lombi (Pakistan) Sohail Abbas (10 goals)
- Best player: (Australia) Troy Elder

The 2002 Men's Hockey World Cup was the 10th edition of the Hockey World Cup, a men's field hockey tournament. It was held from 24 February to 9 March 2002 in Kuala Lumpur, Malaysia.

Germany won their first title after defeating Australia 2–1 in the final. Netherlands won the third place match by defeating South Korea 3–2 with a golden goal.

For this tournament, the participating nations were increased from the standard 12 (as in the 5 previous editions) to 16 and each squad could consist of 18 players instead of the normal 16 after the FIH considered the hot and humid conditions in Malaysia.

== Qualification ==
Each of the continental champions from five confederations and the host nation received an automatic berth. The European confederation received one extra quota based upon the FIH World Rankings. Pakistan and England qualified as fourth and sixth team in final ranking at the 2000 Summer Olympics, completing the final line-up alongside the seven teams from the Qualifier.

Dates	Event	Location	Quotas	Qualifier(s)
Host nation			1	Malaysia
1–12 September 1999	1999 EuroHockey Nations Championship	Padua, Italy	2	Germany; Netherlands
18–28 September 1999	1999 Hockey Asia Cup	Kuala Lumpur, Malaysia	1	South Korea
13–20 May 2000	2000 Hockey African Cup for Nations	Bulawayo, Zimbabwe	1	South Africa
22 June–2 July 2000	2000 Pan American Cup	Havana, Cuba	1	Cuba
Mid-2001	2001 Oceania Cup	Melbourne, Australia	1	Australia
17–29 July 2001	Intercontinental Cup	Edinburgh, Scotland	7	Argentina; Spain; Poland; Belgium; India; Japan; New Zealand
16–30 September 2000	2000 Summer Olympics	Sydney, Australia	2	Pakistan; England
Total			16	

== Umpires ==
The International Hockey Federation appointed 20 umpires for this tournament:

- Xavier Adell (ESP)
- Santiago Deo (ESP)
- Henrik Ehlers (DEN)
- Peter Elders (NED)
- David Gentles (AUS)
- Steve Graham (WAL)
- Murray Grime (AUS)
- Han Jin-soo (KOR)
- Hamish Jamson (ENG)
- Jason McCracken (NZL)
- Clive McMurray (RSA)
- Raymond O'Connor (IRL)
- Sumesh Putra (CAN)
- Mahmood Butt Raashed (PAK)
- Edmundo Saladino (ARG)
- Amarjit Singh (MAS)
- Satinder Kumar (IND)
- Pedro Teixeira (POR)
- Richard Wolter (GER)
- John Wright (RSA)

== Group stage ==
All times are Malaysia Time (UTC+08:00)

=== Pool A ===
Pos	Team	Pld	W	D	L	GF	GA	GD	Pts	Qualification
1	Germany	7	6	0	1	19	8	+11	18	Semi-finals
2	Netherlands	7	5	1	1	17	5	+12	16	Semi-finals
3	Argentina	7	5	0	2	18	12	+6	15	
4	Pakistan	7	4	0	3	16	9	+7	12	
5	Spain	7	3	2	2	12	11	+1	11	
6	New Zealand	7	2	0	5	9	18	−9	6	
7	South Africa	7	1	1	5	7	19	−12	4	
8	Belgium	7	0	0	7	7	23	−16	0	

Source: FIH

24 February 2002
16:05

Pakistan	5–0	South Africa
Bashir 25', 56'; Abbas 39', 63'; Shabir 54'	Report

Umpires:
Murray Grime (AUS)
Han Jin-soo (KOR)

24 February 2002
16:35

Belgium	0–2	Spain
	Report	Sala 19'; Ribas 53'

Umpires:
Amarjit Singh (MAS)
Keith Roper (ENG)

24 February 2002
18:05

Germany	5–2	Argentina
Bechmann 25'; Weß 32'; Wein 34'; Michel 39'; Witthaus 62'	Report	Capurro 16'; Almada 55'

Umpires:
Raymond O'Connor (IRL)
David Gentles (AUS)

24 February 2002
18:35

Netherlands	4–0	New Zealand
Eikelboom 7'; Lomans 11'; Geeris 57'; De Nooijer 65'	Report

Umpires:
Henrik Ehlers (DEN)
Satinder Kumar (IND)

25 February 2002
16:05

Pakistan	3–2	Belgium
Abbas 10', 41'; Saleem 50'	Report	Khopolov 5'; Brooke 36'

Umpires:
Pedro Teixeira (POR)
Hamish Jamson (ENG)

25 February 2002
18:05

South Africa	0–3	Germany
	Report	Domke 16', 65'; Reinelt 21'

Umpires:
Steve Graham (WAL)
Amarjit Singh (MAS)

25 February 2002
18:35

New Zealand	1–3	Spain
Parag 10'	Report	Ribas 35+'; Arnau 53'; Escarré 67'

Umpires:
Sumesh Putra (CAN)
David Gentles (AUS)

25 February 2002
20:05

Netherlands	2–1	Argentina
Brouwer 17'; De Nooijer 69'	Report	Lombi 11'

Umpires:
Santiago Deo (ESP)
Murray Grime (AUS)

27 February 2002
08:05

Belgium	1–5	Netherlands
Luycx 54'	Report	Eikelboom 15'; Klaver 21'; Taekema 33', 67'; De Nooijer 44'

Umpires:
Han Jin-soo (KOR)
Keith Roper (ENG)

27 February 2002
08:35

Argentina	4–1	South Africa
Almada 7'; Lombi 18', 22'; Vila 70+'	Report	Nicol 63'

Umpires:
Xavier Adell (ESP)
Satinder Kumar (IND)

27 February 2002
16:05

Germany	2–3	Spain
Michel 68'; Domke 70+'	Report	Tubau 23', 46'; Ribas 62'

Umpires:
Henrik Ehlers (DEN)
Raymond O'Connor (IRL)

27 February 2002
18:35

Pakistan	2–0	New Zealand
Ahmed 39'; Saleem 57'	Report

Umpires:
Amarjit Singh (MAS)
Edmundo Saladino (ARG)

28 February 2002
16:05

Spain	1–1	Netherlands
Quintana 55'	Report	Klaver 16'

Umpires:
Richard Wolter (GER)
Hamish Jamson (ENG)

28 February 2002
18:05

South Africa	1–2	New Zealand
Nicol 35+'	Report	Towns 14'; Hari 59'

Umpires:
Murray Grime (AUS)
Keith Roper (ENG)

28 February 2002
18:35

Argentina	2–1	Pakistan
MacCormik 46'; Paredes 59'	Report	Abbas 9'

Umpires:
Sumesh Putra (CAN)
Han Jin-soo (KOR)

28 February 2002
20:05

Belgium	0–3	Germany
	Report	Bierderlack 24'; Reinelt 27'; Michel 54'

Umpires:
Satinder Kumar (IND)
Pedro Teixeira (POR)

2 March 2002
08:05

Germany	2–1	New Zealand
Michel 33'; Bechmann 60'	Report	Gill 52'

Umpires:
Clive McMurray (RSA)
Sumesh Putra (CAN)

2 March 2002
08:35

Spain	2–2	South Africa
Amat 22'; Tubau 35+'	Report	Abrahams 23'; King 70+'

Umpires:
Murray Grime (AUS)
Amarjit Singh (MAS)

2 March 2002
16:35

Belgium	1–3	Argentina
Vandeweghe 45'	Report	Vila 34'; Lombi 44', 64'

Umpires:
David Gentles (AUS)
Keith Roper (ENG)

2 March 2002
20:05

Pakistan	1–2	Netherlands
Saleem 55'	Report	Lomans 19', 37'

Umpires:
Henrik Ehlers (DEN)
Raymond O'Connor (IRL)

3 March 2002
16:05

Argentina	3–1	New Zealand
Lombi 3'; Vila 31'; Almada 66'	Report	Burrows 9'

Umpires:
Hamish Jamson (ENG)
Raymond O'Connor (IRL)

3 March 2002
18:05

Spain	0–2	Pakistan
	Report	Raza 60'; Bashir 67'

Umpires:
John Wright (RSA)
Keith Roper (ENG)

3 March 2002
18:35

South Africa	3–0	Belgium
Nicol 29'; King 56'; Cullen 70+'	Report

Umpires:
Steve Graham (WAL)
Satinder Kumar (IND)

3 March 2002
20:05

Netherlands	0–1	Germany
	Report	Michel 57'

Umpires:
Murray Grime (AUS)
Han Jin-soo (KOR)

5 March 2002
08:05

Belgium	3–4	New Zealand
Khopolov 30'; Vandeweghe 67', 70+'	Report	Shaw 24', 41', 62'; Parag 64'

Umpires:
Edmundo Saladino (ARG)
Hamish Jamson (ENG)

5 March 2002
08:35

Pakistan	2–3	Germany
Abbas 35+', 38'	Report	Reinelt 20'; Kunz 24', 50'

Umpires:
Clive McMurray (RSA)
Jason McCracken (NZL)

5 March 2002
16:05

South Africa	0–3	Netherlands
	Report	De Nooijer 11'; Klaver 29'; Geeris 41'

Umpires:
Amarjit Singh (MAS)
David Gentles (AUS)

5 March 2002
20:05

Argentina	3–1	Spain
Almada 15', 35+'; Vila 25'	Report	Sala 24'

Umpires:
Murray Grime (AUS)
Han Jin-soo (KOR)

=== Pool B ===
Pos	Team	Pld	W	D	L	GF	GA	GD	Pts	Qualification
1	Australia	7	7	0	0	28	6	+22	21	Semi-finals
2	South Korea	7	5	0	2	20	11	+9	15	Semi-finals
3	Malaysia (H)	7	4	1	2	14	13	+1	13	
4	England	7	4	0	3	15	7	+8	12	
5	Japan	7	3	1	3	10	15	−5	10	
6	India	7	2	1	4	18	15	+3	7	
7	Poland	7	1	1	5	9	19	−10	4	
8	Cuba	7	0	0	7	7	35	−28	0	

Source: FIH
(H) Hosts

24 February 2002
08:05

Cuba	2–6	South Korea
Abreu 19'; Lemus 20'	Report	Yeo Woon-kon 9'; Yoo Moon-ki 41'; Song Seung-tae 44'; Shin Seok-kyo 54'; Kang Keon-wook 63'; Yong Sung-hoon 67'

Umpires:
Xavier Adell (ESP)
Clive McMurray (RSA)

24 February 2002
08:35

England	1–0	Poland
Mathews 54'	Report

Umpires:
Edmundo Saladino (ARG)
John Wright (RSA)

24 February 2002
20:05

Japan	2–2	India
Yamabori 10'; Ozawa 36'	Report	Pillay 41'; Thakur 47'

Umpires:
Richard Wolter (GER)
Jason McCracken (NZL)

24 February 2002
20:35

Malaysia	0–3	Australia
	Report	McCann 41'; Elder 49', 68'

Umpires:
Peter Elders (NED)
Mahmood Butt Raashed (PAK)

26 February 2002
16:05

South Korea	2–1	India
Yeo Woon-kon 20'; Song Seung-tae 66'	Report	J. Singh 70+'

Umpires:
Henrik Ehlers (DEN)
Peter Elders (NED)

26 February 2002
18:05

Japan	0–1	Malaysia
	Report	Chairil 27'

Umpires:
Xavier Adell (ESP)
John Wright (RSA)

26 February 2002
18:35

Australia	1–0	England
George 53'	Report

Umpires:
Sumesh Putra (CAN)
Richard Wolter (GER)

26 February 2002
20:05

Poland	4–1	Cuba
T. Choczaj 16'; Grzeszczak 47'; Mikula 57'; S. Choczaj 70+'	Report	Blanco 5'

Umpires:
Mahmood Butt Raashed (PAK)
Jason McCracken (NZL)

27 February 2002
16:35

Malaysia	3–2	India
Shankar 2'; Keevan 19'; Nawawi 31'	Report	D. Singh 51'; P. Singh 58'

Umpires:
Steve Graham (WAL)
Hamish Jamson (ENG)

27 February 2002
18:05

Poland	1–5	Australia
T. Choczaj 38'	Report	Dwyer 35'; McCann 51', 67'; Victory 57'; Elder 62'

Umpires:
Clive McMurray (RSA)
Santiago Deo (ESP)

27 February 2002
20:05

England	7–0	Cuba
Hall 4'; Mathews 19', 68'; Goudie 32'; Pearn 35+'; Bertram 57'; Sharpe 64'	Report

Umpires:
David Gentles (AUS)
John Wright (RSA)

27 February 2002
20:35

South Korea	3–0	Japan
Lee Jung-seon 24'; Song Seung-tae 41', 60'	Report

Umpires:
Mahmood Butt Raashed (PAK)
Pedro Teixeira (POR)

1 March 2002
16:05

Australia	6–0	Cuba
Dwyer 3'; Victory 15', 39'; Gaudoin 41'; McCann 66'; Smith 70+'	Report

Umpires:
Steve Graham (WAL)
Mahmood Butt Raashed (PAK)

1 March 2002
18:05

Poland	1–2	Japan
Mikuła 45'	Report	Tobita 63'; Katayama 70+'

Umpires:
Raymond O'Connor (IRL)
Peter Elders (NED)

1 March 2002
18:35

England	3–2	India
Hall 11', 46'; Bertram 53'	Report	Tirkey 45'; Dhillon 56'

Umpires:
Santiago Deo (ESP)
Clive McMurray (RSA)

1 March 2002
20:05

Malaysia	2–3	South Korea
Kuhan 23', 54'	Report	Kang Keon-wook 15'; Lee Jung-seon 21'; Yeo Woon-kon 28'

Umpires:
Jason McCracken (NZL)
Henrik Ehlers (DEN)

2 March 2002
16:05

Japan	0–5	Australia
	Report	Hiskins 2'; Wells 8', 55'; Victory 50', 70'

Umpires:
Jason McCracken (NZL)
Edmundo Saladino (ARG)

2 March 2002
18:05

Cuba	0–4	India
	Report	Tirkey 9'; D. Singh 14'; Thakur 16'; Dhillon 52'

Umpires:
Edmundo Saladino (ARG)
Jason McCracken (NZL)

2 March 2002
18:05

South Korea	4–0	Poland
Hwang Jong-hyun 10'; Kim Jung-chul 15'; Kim Kyung-seok 16'; Lee Jung-seon 23'	Report

Umpires:
Pedro Teixeira (POR)
Han Jin-soo (KOR)

2 March 2002
20:35

England	1–2	Malaysia
Mathews 64'	Report	Singh 9'; Madzli 41'

Umpires:
John Wright (RSA)
Xavier Adell (ESP)

4 March 2002
16:05

England	1–2	Japan
	Report	Yamabori 15', 24'

Umpires:
Sumesh Putra (CAN)
Mahmood Butt Raashed (PAK)

4 March 2002
18:05

Malaysia	4–2	Cuba
Chairil 11'; Fairuz 26'; Kuhan 29', 40'	Report	J. Garcia 8'; Rodriguez Hernandez 16'

Umpires:
Henrik Ehlers (DEN)
Edmundo Saladino (ARG)

4 March 2002
18:35

Poland	1–4	India
T. Choczaj 23'	Report	D. Singh 5'; Dhillon 16'; P. Singh 26'; Pillay 68'

Umpires:
Richard Wolter (GER)
Peter Elders (NED)

4 March 2002
20:05

Australia	4–2	South Korea
Webster 8'; Elder 14'; Hiskins 41', 43'	Report	Song Seung-tae 28'; Lee Jung-seon 62'

Umpires:
Santiago Deo (ESP)
Pedro Teixeira (POR)

5 March 2002
16:35

Cuba	2–4	Japan
Blanco Hernandez 19'; J. Garcia 30'	Report	Yamabori 26', 64'; Takahashi 33'; Karuo 62'

Umpires:
Satinder Kumar (IND)
Xavier Adell (ESP)

5 March 2002
18:05

England	2–0	South Korea
Mathews 31', 33'	Report

Umpires:
Santiago Deo (ESP)
John Wright (RSA)

5 March 2002
18:35

Australia	4–3	India
Victory 42'; Hiskins 51'; Livermore 59'; Smith 63'	Report	J. Singh 25'; D. Singh 45'; P. Singh 67'

Umpires:
Raymond O'Connor (IRL)
Steve Graham (WAL)

5 March 2002
20:35

Poland	2–2	Malaysia
Gaczowski 13', 46'	Report	Jiwa 8'; Kuhan 62'

Umpires:
Peter Elders (NED)
Richard Wolter (GER)

== Classification round ==
=== Thirteenth to sixteenth place classification ===
Crossover
7 March 2002
South Africa	5
Cuba	1
7 March 2002
Poland	1
Belgium	2

Thirteenth place
8 March 2002
South Africa (a.e.t.)	5
Belgium	4
Fifteenth place
8 March 2002
Cuba	0
Poland	3

==== Crossover ====
7 March 2002
08:05

South Africa	5–1	Cuba
King 9'; Nicol 10', 30'; Clark 11'; Smith 56'	Report	Gonzalez 27'

Umpires:
Sumesh Putra (CAN)
Satinder Kumar (IND)

7 March 2002
08:35

Poland	1–2	Belgium
Grotowski 54'	Report	Coudron 41', 44'

Umpires:
Xavier Adell (ESP)
David Gentles (AUS)

==== Fifteenth and sixteenth place ====
8 March 2002
08:05

Cuba	0–3	Poland
	Report	Gaczkowski 47'; Witczak 60'; Grotowski 66'

Umpires:
Pedro Teixeira (POR)
Mahmood Butt Raashed (PAK)

==== Thirteenth and fourteenth place ====
8 March 2002
08:35

South Africa	5–4 (a.e.t.)	Belgium
King 44', 70', 73'; Nicol 57'; Clark 61'	Report	Reckinger 18'; Geens 30'; Brooke 41'; Coudron 56'

Umpires:
Sumesh Putra (CAN)
Edmundo Saladino (ARG)

=== Ninth to twelfth place classification ===
Crossover
7 March 2002
Spain	0
India	3
7 March 2002
Japan	3 (6)
New Zealand (p.s.o.)	3 (7)

Ninth place
8 March 2002
India	1
New Zealand	2
Eleventh place
8 March 2002
Spain	5
Japan	1

==== Crossover ====
7 March 2002
16:05

Spain	0–3	India
	Report	Dhillon 7'; J. Singh 19'; Thakur 27'

Umpires:
Peter Elders (NED)
Amarjit Singh (MAS)

7 March 2002
21:05

Japan
3–3 (a.e.t.)
New Zealand
Asai 27'
Yamabori 37'
Tobita 45'
Report
Parag 2'
Towns 22'
Burrows 66'
Penalties
Tobita (penalty shoot-out scored)
Hirata (penalty shoot-out scored)
Yamahori (penalty shoot-out scored)
Katayama (penalty shoot-out scored)
Hokaze (penalty shoot-out missed)

——
Tobita (penalty shoot-out scored)
Hirata (penalty shoot-out scored)
Yamahori (penalty shoot-out missed)

6–7
(penalty shoot-out scored) Gill
(penalty shoot-out scored) Shaw
(penalty shoot-out missed) Archibald
(penalty shoot-out scored) Kosoof
(penalty shoot-out scored) Couzins
——
(penalty shoot-out scored) Gill
(penalty shoot-out scored) Shaw
(penalty shoot-out scored) Kosoof

Umpires:
Keith Roper (ENG)
Steve Graham (WAL)

==== Eleventh and twelfth place ====
8 March 2002
21:35

Spain	5–1	Japan
Amat 32'; Fabregas 52'; Tubau 53'; Sanchez 56'; Escarré 70'	Report	Katayama 54'

Umpires:
Clive McMurray (RSA)
Hamish Jamson (ENG)

==== Ninth and tenth place ====
8 March 2002
19:05

India	1–2	New Zealand
Thakur 10'	Report	Archibald 59'; Burrows 64'

Umpires:
Clive McMurray (RSA)
Hamish Jamson (ENG)

=== Fifth to eighth place classification ===
Crossover
7 March 2002
Argentina (a.e.t.)	2
England	1
7 March 2002
Malaysia	1
Pakistan	2

Fifth place
8 March 2002
Argentina	3
Pakistan	5
Seventh place
8 March 2002
England	3
Malaysia	2

==== Crossover ====
7 March 2002
18:35

Argentina	2–1 (a.e.t.)	England
Lombi 29', 79'	Report	Hall 48'

Umpires:
Pedro Teixeira (POR)
John Wright (RSA)

7 March 2002
16:35

Malaysia	1–2	Pakistan
Tajol 59'	Report	Abbas 19'; Ahmed 53'

Umpires:
Richard Wolter (GER)
Han Jin-Soo (KOR)

==== Seventh and eighth place ====
8 March 2002
17:35

England	3–2	Malaysia
Hall 32', 39'; Pearn 68'	Report	Chua Boon Huat 16'; Chairil 43'

Umpires:
Jason McCracken (NZL)
Henrik Ehlers (DEN)

==== Fifth and sixth place ====
8 March 2002
20:05

Argentina	3–5	Pakistan
Lombi 11', 45'; Zylberberg 29'	Report	Raza 22'; Abbas 24', 62'; Nadeem 62'; Jawad 70'

Umpires:
Peter Elders (NED)
Han Jin-Soo (KOR)

=== First to fourth place classification ===
Semi-finals
7 March 2002
Germany	3
South Korea	2
7 March 2002
Australia	4
Netherlands	1

Final
9 March 2002
Germany	2
Australia	1
Third place
9 March 2002
South Korea	1
Netherlands (a.e.t.)	2

==== Semifinals ====
7 March 2002
19:05

Germany	3–2	South Korea
Emmerling 7'; Bechmann 40'; Witthaus 56'	Report	Yeo Woon-kon 4', 46'

Umpires:
Raymond O'Connor (IRL)
Murray Grime (AUS)

7 March 2002
21:35

Australia	4–1	Netherlands
Webster 9'; Dwyer 12', 51'; Smith 39'	Report	Booij 64'

Umpires:
Henrik Ehlers (DEN)
Santiago Deo (ESP)

==== Third and fourth place ====
9 March 2002
18:05

South Korea	1–2 (a.e.t.)	Netherlands
Song Seung-tae 9'	Report	van der Weide 68'; Buma 72'

Umpires:
Richard Wolter (GER)
Murray Grime (AUS)

==== Final ====
9 March 2002
20:35

Germany	2–1	Australia
Kunz 34'; Domke 64'	Report	Elder 31'

Umpires:
Santiago Deo (ESP)
Raymond O'Connor (IRL)

== Awards ==
Top Goalscorers	Man of the Final	Player of the Tournament	Fair Play Trophy
(Argentina) Jorge Lombi (Pakistan) Sohail Abbas	(Germany) Florian Kunz	(Australia) Troy Elder	South Africa

== Statistics ==
=== Final standings ===
Pos	Grp	Team	Pld	W	D	L	GF	GA	GD	Pts	Final result
1	A	Germany	9	8	0	1	24	11	+13	24	Gold medal
2	B	Australia	9	8	0	1	33	9	+24	24	Silver medal
3	A	Netherlands	9	6	1	2	20	10	+10	19	Bronze medal
4	B	South Korea	9	5	0	4	23	16	+7	15	Fourth place
5	A	Pakistan	9	6	0	3	23	13	+10	18	Eliminated in group stage
6	A	Argentina	9	6	0	3	23	18	+5	18	Eliminated in group stage
7	B	England	9	5	0	4	19	11	+8	15	Eliminated in group stage
8	B	Malaysia (H)	9	4	1	4	17	18	−1	13	Eliminated in group stage
9	A	New Zealand	9	3	1	5	14	22	−8	10	Eliminated in group stage
10	B	India	9	3	1	5	22	17	+5	10	Eliminated in group stage
11	A	Spain	9	4	2	3	17	15	+2	14	Eliminated in group stage
12	B	Japan	9	3	2	4	14	23	−9	11	Eliminated in group stage
13	A	South Africa	9	3	1	5	17	24	−7	10	Eliminated in group stage
14	A	Belgium	9	1	0	8	13	29	−16	3	Eliminated in group stage
15	B	Poland	9	2	1	6	13	21	−8	7	Eliminated in group stage
16	B	Cuba	9	0	0	9	8	43	−35	0	Eliminated in group stage

Source: FIH
(H) Hosts

=== Goalscorers ===
There were 300 goals scored in 72 matches, for an average of 4.17 goals per match.

10 goals

- (Argentina) Jorge Lombi
- (Pakistan) Sohail Abbas

7 goals

- (England) David Mathews

6 goals

- (Australia) Craig Victory
- (England) Daniel Hall
- (Japan) Tamahiro Yamabori
- (South Africa) Justin King
- (South Africa) Greg Nicol
- (South Korea) Song Seung-Tae

5 goals

- (Argentina) Mario Almada
- (Australia) Troy Elder
- (Germany) Björn Michel
- (Malaysia) Kuhan Shanmuganathan
- (South Korea) Yeo Woon-Kon

4 goals

- (Australia) Jamie Dwyer
- (Australia) Jeremy Hiskins
- (Australia) Michael McCann
- (Germany) Oliver Domke
- (India) Baljit Singh Dhillon
- (India) Daljit Singh
- (India) Deepak Thakur
- (Netherlands) Teun de Nooijer
- (South Korea) Lee Jung-Seon
- (Spain) Eduard Tubau

3 goals

- (Australia) Andrew Smith
- (Belgium) Marc Coudron
- (Belgium) Charles Vandeweghe
- (Germany) Christoph Bechmann
- (Germany) Florian Kunz
- (Germany) Sascha Reinelt
- (India) Jugraj Singh
- (India) Prabhjot Singh
- (Malaysia) Chairil Anwar Abdul Aziz
- (Netherlands) Karel Klaver
- (Netherlands) Bram Lomans
- (New Zealand) Phil Burrows
- (New Zealand) Umesh Parag
- (New Zealand) Hayden Shaw
- (Pakistan) Atif Bashir
- (Pakistan) Khalid Saleem
- (Poland) Tomasz Choczaj
- (Poland) Eugeniusz Gaczkowski
- (Spain) Xavier Ribas

2 goals

- (Argentina) Matías Vila
- (Argentina) Rodrigo Vila
- (Australia) Scott Webster
- (Australia) Matthew Wells
- (Belgium) Xavier Brooke
- (Belgium) Vitali Khopolov
- (Cuba) Yoandi Blanco
- (Cuba) José Rodríguez García
- (England) Thomas Bertram
- (England) Mark Pearn
- (Germany) Matthias Witthaus
- (India) Dilip Tirkey
- (India) Dhanraj Pillay
- (Japan) Kenichi Katayama
- (Japan) Naohiko Tobita
- (Netherlands) Marten Eikelboom
- (Netherlands) Piet-Hein Geeris
- (Netherlands) Taeke Taekema
- (New Zealand) Simon Towns
- (Pakistan) Shahbad Ahmed
- (Pakistan) Ali Raza
- (Poland) Robert Grotowski
- (Poland) Artur Mikuła
- (South Africa) Gregg Clark
- (South Korea) Kang Keon-Wook
- (Spain) Pol Amat
- (Spain) Juan Escarré
- (Spain) Albert Sala

1 goal

- (Argentina) Santiago Capurro
- (Argentina) Tomás MacCormik
- (Argentina) Matías Paredes
- (Argentina) Fernando Zylberberg
- (Australia) Paul Gaudoin
- (Australia) Bevan George
- (Australia) Brent Livermore
- (Belgium) Robert Greens
- (Belgium) Maxime Luycx
- (Belgium) Xavier Reckinger
- (Cuba) Alexander Abreu
- (Cuba) Roberto Lemus
- (Cuba) Yuniel Rodríguez Hernández
- (Cuba) Edel Sáyas González
- (England) Jerome Goudie
- (England) Benjamin Sharpe
- (Germany) Sebastian Biederlack
- (Germany) Björn Emmerling
- (Germany) Christian Wein
- (Germany) Timo Weß
- (Japan) Kenji Asai
- (Japan) Makato Karuo
- (Japan) Kazuyuki Ozawa
- (Japan) Akira Takahashi
- (Malaysia) Chua Boon Huat
- (Malaysia) Mohammed Fairuz Ramly
- (Malaysia) Mohammed Madzli Ikmar
- (Malaysia) Jiwa Mohan
- (Malaysia) Mirnawan Nawawi
- (Malaysia) Keevan Raj
- (Malaysia) Tajol Rosli Mohamed
- (Malaysia) Shankar Shanmugam
- (Malaysia) Maninderjit Singh Sidhu
- (Netherlands) Menno Booij
- (Netherlands) Ronald Brouwer
- (Netherlands) Jaap-Derk Buma
- (Netherlands) Sander van der Weide
- (New Zealand) Ryan Archibald
- (New Zealand) Hymie Gill
- (New Zealand) Bevan Hari
- (Pakistan) Kashif Jawad
- (Pakistan) Muhammad Nadeem
- (Pakistan) Muhammad Shabir
- (Poland) Slawomir Choczaj
- (Poland) Robert Grzeszczak
- (Poland) Krzysztof Witczak
- (South Africa) Clyde Abrahams
- (South Africa) Michael Cullen
- (South Africa) Emile Smith
- (South Korea) Kim Jung-Chul
- (South Korea) Hwang Jong-Hyun
- (South Korea) Kim Kyung-Seok
- (South Korea) Yoo Moon-Ki
- (South Korea) Shin Seok-Kyo
- (South Korea) Yong Sung-Hoon
- (Spain) Xavier Arnau
- (Spain) Francisco Fábregas Monegal
- (Spain) Jordi Quintana
- (Spain) Joseph Sánchez

Source: FIH
