= 2001 Men's Intercontinental Cup (field hockey) =

Field hockey tournament

Tournament details
- Host country: Scotland
- City: Edinburgh
- Teams: 16

Final positions
- Champions: Argentina
- Runner-up: Spain
- Third place: Poland

Tournament statistics
- Matches played: 64
- Goals scored: 265 (4.14 per match)
- Top scorer: (Argentina) Jorge Lombi (18 goals)

The 2001 Men's Intercontinental Cup was a qualifier for the 2002 Men's Hockey World Cup. It was held between 17–29 July 2001 in Edinburgh, Scotland. Argentina won the tournament after defeating Spain 5–4 in the final. Alongside Poland, Belgium, India, Japan and New Zealand, these seven teams qualified for the World Cup.

== Qualification ==
Except for Oceania, all other four confederations received quotas for teams to participate allocated by the International Hockey Federation based upon the FIH World Rankings. Those teams participated at their respective continental championships but could not qualify through it, and they received the chance to qualify through this tournament based on the final ranking at each competition.

| Dates | Event | Location | Qualifier(s) |
|---|---|---|---|
| Host nation | | | Scotland |
| 1–12 September 1999 | 1999 EuroHockey Nations Championship | Padua, Italy | Belgium; Spain; Wales; France; Russia; Poland |
| 18–28 September 1999 | 1999 Hockey Asia Cup | Kuala Lumpur, Malaysia | India; Japan; Bangladesh |
| 13–20 May 2000 | 2000 Hockey African Cup for Nations | Bulawayo, Zimbabwe | Egypt —^{1} |
| 22 June–2 July 2000 | 2000 Pan American Cup | Havana, Cuba | Canada; Argentina; Chile; United States |
| Invitational | | | New Zealand^{1} |

^1–Zimbabwe withdrew due to financial reasons. The FIH invited New Zealand instead to participate.

== Results ==
All times are British Summer Time (UTC+01:00)

=== Preliminary round ===
==== Pool A ====
| Pos | Team | Pld | W | D | L | GF | GA | GD | Pts | Result |
|---|---|---|---|---|---|---|---|---|---|---|
| 1 | New Zealand | 3 | 3 | 0 | 0 | 5 | 1 | +4 | 9 | Advanced to Medal Round |
| 2 | India | 3 | 2 | 0 | 1 | 5 | 3 | +2 | 6 | Advanced to Medal Round |
| 3 | Wales | 3 | 1 | 0 | 2 | 4 | 5 | −1 | 3 | |
| 4 | Egypt | 3 | 0 | 0 | 3 | 4 | 9 | −5 | 0 | |

Source: FIH
Rules for classification: 1) points; 2) goal difference; 3) games won; 4) head-to-head result.

18 July 2001
10:00

| Egypt | 1–3 | New Zealand |
|---|---|---|
| Walid 26' | Report | Leaver 6', 15'; Parag 57' |

18 July 2001
12:00

| India | 2–1 | Wales |
|---|---|---|
| Prabhjot 46'; Baljit 53' | Report | Organ 69' |

19 July 2001
10:00

| Wales | 3–2 | Egypt |
|---|---|---|
| Organ 47', 67'; Edwards 65' | Report | Nagy 16', 35' |

19 July 2001
12:00

| India | 0–1 | New Zealand |
|---|---|---|
| | Report | Archibald 35' |

21 July 2001
10:00

| India | 3–1 | Egypt |
|---|---|---|
| Baljit 41', 46'; Halappa 53' | Report | Walid 64' |

21 July 2001
12:00

| Wales | 0–1 | New Zealand |
|---|---|---|
| | Report | Kosoof 69' |

==== Pool B ====
| Pos | Team | Pld | W | D | L | GF | GA | GD | Pts | Result |
|---|---|---|---|---|---|---|---|---|---|---|
| 1 | Argentina | 3 | 3 | 0 | 0 | 12 | 3 | +9 | 9 | Advanced to Medal Round |
| 2 | Belgium | 3 | 1 | 1 | 1 | 7 | 3 | +4 | 4 | Advanced to Medal Round |
| 3 | France | 3 | 1 | 1 | 1 | 7 | 5 | +2 | 4 | |
| 4 | Bangladesh | 3 | 0 | 0 | 3 | 3 | 18 | −15 | 0 | |

Source: FIH
Rules for classification: 1) points; 2) goal difference; 3) games won; 4) head-to-head result.

17 July 2001
10:00

| Argentina | 8–1 | Bangladesh |
|---|---|---|
| Almada 16', 30', 54'; J. Lombi 18', 44', 59'; Capurro 24'; Retegui 52' | Report | Mia 29' |

Umpires:
Peter Elders (NED)
Gerald Curran (SCO)

17 July 2001
12:00

| Belgium | 1–1 | France |
|---|---|---|
| Luycx 64' | Report | M. Durchon 53' |

Umpires:
Richard Wölter (GER)
David Hunt (WAL)

18 July 2001
12:30

| Belgium | 5–0 | Bangladesh |
|---|---|---|
| Willems 8', 27', 65'; De Chaffoy 23'; Coudron 25' | Report |

18 July 2001
14:30

| France | 1–2 | Argentina |
|---|---|---|
| Gaillard 34' | Report | J. Lombi 6'; MacCormik 10' |

20 July 2001
10:00

| Argentina | 2–1 | Belgium |
|---|---|---|
| J. Lombi 11'; Almada 19' | Report | Beunen 25' |

20 July 2001
12:00

| France | 5–2 | Bangladesh |
|---|---|---|
| F. Durchon 12'; D'Agostino 17', 64'; Soyez 21'; Daleton 35' | Report | Reza 62'; Khursheed 63' |

==== Pool C ====
| Pos | Team | Pld | W | D | L | GF | GA | GD | Pts | Result |
|---|---|---|---|---|---|---|---|---|---|---|
| 1 | Spain | 3 | 3 | 0 | 0 | 16 | 0 | +16 | 9 | Advanced to Medal Round |
| 2 | Japan | 3 | 2 | 0 | 1 | 6 | 6 | 0 | 6 | Advanced to Medal Round |
| 3 | Scotland (H) | 3 | 1 | 0 | 2 | 6 | 5 | +1 | 3 | |
| 4 | Chile | 3 | 0 | 0 | 3 | 1 | 18 | −17 | 0 | |

Source: FIH
Rules for classification: 1) points; 2) goal difference; 3) games won; 4) head-to-head result.
(H) Hosts

18 July 2001
15:00

| Chile | 0–4 | Japan |
|---|---|---|
| | Report | Katayama 8'; Tobita 17'; Kawada 33'; Asai 53' |

18 July 2001
17:00

| Scotland | 0–2 | Spain |
|---|---|---|
| | Report | Quintana 10'; Ribas 67' |

19 July 2001
15:00

| Spain | 9–0 | Chile |
|---|---|---|
| Arnau 5', 29', 69'; Escarré 12', 34'; Amat 36', 45', 59'; Tubau 57' | Report |

19 July 2001
17:00

| Scotland | 1–2 | Japan |
|---|---|---|
| Forsyth 18' | Report | Tobita 5', 37' |

21 July 2001
15:00

| Chile | 1–5 | Scotland |
|---|---|---|
| Montegu 68' | Report | Docherty 16', 19', 22', 56'; Burns 31' |

21 July 2001
17:00

| Spain | 5–0 | Japan |
|---|---|---|
| Quintana 4', 6'; Escarré 38'; Arnau 40'; Amat 59' | Report |

==== Pool D ====
| Pos | Team | Pld | W | D | L | GF | GA | GD | Pts | Result |
|---|---|---|---|---|---|---|---|---|---|---|
| 1 | Poland | 3 | 3 | 0 | 0 | 10 | 3 | +7 | 9 | Advanced to Medal Round |
| 2 | Canada | 3 | 2 | 0 | 1 | 8 | 5 | +3 | 6 | Advanced to Medal Round |
| 3 | United States | 3 | 1 | 0 | 2 | 4 | 9 | −5 | 3 | |
| 4 | Russia | 3 | 0 | 0 | 3 | 2 | 7 | −5 | 0 | |

Source: FIH
Rules for classification: 1) points; 2) goal difference; 3) games won; 4) head-to-head result.

17 July 2001
15:00

| Canada | 1–2 | Poland |
|---|---|---|
| Roberts 7' | Report | Szmidt 61'; P. Mikuła 64' |

Umpires:
Horacio Servetto (ARG)
Xavier Adell (ESP)

17 July 2001
17:30

| United States | 1–0 | Russia |
|---|---|---|
| Daraspreet 58' | Report |

19 July 2001
12:30

| United States | 2–4 | Canada |
|---|---|---|
| Hoang 59'; P. Harris 67' | Report | Wettlaufer 6'; Jagday 14', 21'; Pereira 55' |

19 July 2001
14:30

| Poland | 3–1 | Russia |
|---|---|---|
| A. Mikuła 23'; Choczaj 36'; Grotowski 39' | Report | Krasnoiartsev 65' |

20 July 2001
15:00

| Canada | 3–1 | Russia |
|---|---|---|
| Kullar 17', 59'; Pereira 48' | Report | Safanov 58' |

20 July 2001
15:00

| Poland | 5–1 | United States |
|---|---|---|
| A. Mikuła 3', 37'; P. Mikuła 41'; Strykowski 54'; Choczaj 68' | Report | Nakamura 12' |

=== Medal round ===
==== Pool E ====
| Pos | Team | Pld | W | D | L | GF | GA | GD | Pts | Result |
|---|---|---|---|---|---|---|---|---|---|---|
| 1 | Spain | 3 | 1 | 2 | 0 | 5 | 3 | +2 | 5 | Advanced to Semi-finals and 2002 FIH World Cup |
| 2 | Belgium | 3 | 1 | 2 | 0 | 3 | 2 | +1 | 5 | Advanced to Semi-finals and 2002 FIH World Cup |
| 3 | New Zealand | 3 | 1 | 1 | 1 | 7 | 7 | 0 | 4 | |
| 4 | Canada | 3 | 0 | 1 | 2 | 4 | 7 | −3 | 1 | |

Source: FIH
Rules for classification: 1) points; 2) goal difference; 3) games won; 4) head-to-head result.

22 July 2001
11:00

| New Zealand | 1–1 | Belgium |
|---|---|---|
| Burrows 28' | Report | Beunen 45' |

22 July 2001
15:00

| Spain | 1–1 | Canada |
|---|---|---|
| Amat 52' | Report | Wettlaufer 66' |

23 July 2001
13:00

| Belgium | 1–0 | Canada |
|---|---|---|
| Gierts 36' | Report |

24 July 2001
11:00

| New Zealand | 1–3 | Spain |
|---|---|---|
| Archibald 52' | Report | Fábregas 4'; Amat 38'; Quintana 61' |

25 July 2001
11:00

| Canada | 3–5 | New Zealand |
|---|---|---|
| Short 26', 56', 70' | Report | Hari 25'; Archibald 54'; Burrows 63', 67'; Parag 70' |

25 July 2001
13:00

| Spain | 1–1 | Belgium |
|---|---|---|
| Freixa 31' | Report | Willems 52' |

==== Pool F ====
| Pos | Team | Pld | W | D | L | GF | GA | GD | Pts | Result |
|---|---|---|---|---|---|---|---|---|---|---|
| 1 | Argentina | 3 | 3 | 0 | 0 | 14 | 6 | +8 | 9 | Advanced to Semi-finals and 2002 FIH World Cup |
| 2 | Poland | 3 | 1 | 1 | 1 | 3 | 5 | −2 | 4 | Advanced to Semi-finals and 2002 FIH World Cup |
| 3 | India | 3 | 1 | 0 | 2 | 6 | 7 | −1 | 3 | |
| 4 | Japan | 3 | 0 | 1 | 2 | 2 | 7 | −5 | 1 | |

Source: FIH
Rules for classification: 1) points; 2) goal difference; 3) games won; 4) head-to-head result.

22 July 2001
13:00

| Argentina | 5–3 | India |
|---|---|---|
| R. Vila 19'; J. Lombi 25', 37', 52', 70' | Report | Tirkey 23'; Baljit 47', 63' |

22 July 2001
17:00

| Poland | 0–0 | Japan |
|---|---|---|
| | Report |

23 July 2001
15:00

| Poland | 1–4 | Argentina |
|---|---|---|
| Juszczak 12' | Report | J. Lombi 31', 57', 62'; Almada 53' |

24 July 2001
17:00

| Japan | 0–2 | India |
|---|---|---|
| | Report | Tirkey 21', 55' |

25 July 2001
15:00

| Argentina | 5–2 | Japan |
|---|---|---|
| J. Lombi 51', 57'; Almada 54', 56'; R. Vila 61' | Report | Tobita 65', 69' |

25 July 2001
17:00

| India | 1–2 | Poland |
|---|---|---|
| Fernandes 12' | Report | Juszczak 3'; Choczaj 22' |

=== Classification round ===
==== Pool G ====
| Pos | Team | Pld | W | D | L | GF | GA | GD | Pts |
|---|---|---|---|---|---|---|---|---|---|
| 1 | Wales | 3 | 2 | 1 | 0 | 4 | 2 | +2 | 7 |
| 2 | Scotland (H) | 3 | 2 | 0 | 1 | 10 | 1 | +9 | 6 |
| 3 | Russia | 3 | 1 | 1 | 1 | 7 | 5 | +2 | 4 |
| 4 | Bangladesh | 3 | 0 | 0 | 3 | 0 | 13 | −13 | 0 |

Source: FIH
Rules for classification: 1) points; 2) goal difference; 3) games won; 4) head-to-head result.
(H) Hosts

22 July 2001
10:30

| Wales | 1–0 | Bangladesh |
|---|---|---|
| Edwards 49' | Report |

22 July 2001
15:30

| Scotland | 3–0 | Russia |
|---|---|---|
| Docherty 43', 51'; Mitchell 52' | Report |

23 July 2001
15:30

| Bangladesh | 0–5 | Russia |
|---|---|---|
| | Report | Kuznetsov 8', 63', 67'; Jirkov 58'; Krasnoirtsev 61' |

24 July 2001
15:00

| Wales | 1–0 | Scotland |
|---|---|---|
| Organ 33' | Report |

25 July 2001
13:30

| Scotland | 7–0 | Bangladesh |
|---|---|---|
| Ralph 9', 14', 60'; McCartney 20'; Stott 22'; Webster 52'; Mitchell 54' | Report |

25 July 2001
15:30

| Russia | 2–2 | Wales |
|---|---|---|
| Nechaev 9'; Safonov 55' | Report | Organ 42'; Westerman 46' |

==== Pool H ====
| Pos | Team | Pld | W | D | L | GF | GA | GD | Pts |
|---|---|---|---|---|---|---|---|---|---|
| 1 | France | 3 | 2 | 1 | 0 | 7 | 4 | +3 | 7 |
| 2 | Chile | 3 | 1 | 2 | 0 | 7 | 6 | +1 | 5 |
| 3 | Egypt | 3 | 1 | 1 | 1 | 6 | 7 | −1 | 4 |
| 4 | United States | 3 | 0 | 0 | 3 | 3 | 6 | −3 | 0 |

Source: FIH
Rules for classification: 1) points; 2) goal difference; 3) games won; 4) head-to-head result.

22 July 2001
12:30

| France | 3–1 | Egypt |
|---|---|---|
| Daleton 30'; Jeanjean 31'; Gaillard 59' | Report | Ezz El Din 33' |

22 July 2001
17:30

| United States | 1–2 | Chile |
|---|---|---|
| Hindy 19' | Report | Cota 22', 61' |

23 July 2001
17:00

| France | 2–1 | United States |
|---|---|---|
| Soyez 14', 63' | Report | Manjinder 51' |

24 July 2001
13:00

| Egypt | 3–3 | Chile |
|---|---|---|
| Talaat 29'; Ibrahim 56'; Ezz El Din 57' | Report | Montegu 24'; Stein 37'; Kuhlenthal 42' |

25 July 2001
11:30

| Chile | 2–2 | France |
|---|---|---|
| Montegu 37'; Kuhlenthal 66' | Report | Gailliard 9'; Daleton 27' |

25 July 2001
17:30

| United States | 1–2 | Egypt |
|---|---|---|
| Hindy 70' | Report | Ezz El Din 32', 52' |

=== Classification matches ===
==== Thirteenth to sixteenth place classification ====
Crossover
27 July 2001
Russia | 2
United States | 3
27 July 2001
Egypt | 2
Bangladesh | 1

Thirteenth Place
28 July 2001
United States | 1
Egypt | 2
Fifteenth place
28 July 2001
Russia | 4
Bangladesh | 2

===== Crossover =====
27 July 2001
13:00

| Russia | 2–3 | United States |
|---|---|---|
| Safonov 23', 31' | Report | Martin 54', 56'; Daraspreet 59' |

27 July 2001
16:00

| Egypt | 2–1 | Bangladesh |
|---|---|---|
| F. Nagy 13'; Metwally 28' | Report | Islam 9' |

===== Fifteenth and sixteenth place =====
28 July 2001
13:30

| Russia | 4–2 | Bangladesh |
|---|---|---|
| Kusnetsov 5', 35'; Safanov 48'; Nechaev 53' | Report | Ariful Haq 21'; Maksud Alam 64' |

===== Thirteenth and fourteenth place =====
28 July 2001
13:30

| United States | 1–2 | Egypt |
|---|---|---|
| Hoang 30' | Report | Ezz El Din 19'; Ibrahim 57' |

==== Ninth to twelfth place classification ====
Crossover
27 July 2001
Wales | 3
Chile | 2
27 July 2001
France (pen.) | 3 (5)
Scotland | 3 (4)

Ninth Place
28 July 2001
Wales | 1
France | 2
Eleventh place
28 July 2001
Chile | 4
Scotland (a.e.t) | 5

===== Crossover =====
27 July 2001
10:00

| Wales | 3–2 | Chile |
|---|---|---|
| Ogden 28'; Organ 38'; Westerman 60' | Report | Kuhlenthal 9'; Montegu 42' |

27 July 2001
12:30

| France | 3–3 | Scotland |
|---|---|---|
| Soyez 38', 59'; D'Agostino 57' | Report | Leonard 42'; Stott 65'; Webster 70' |
Penalties
| | 5–4 |

===== Eleventh and twelfth place =====
28 July 2001
15:00

| Chile | 4–5 (a.e.t.) | Scotland |
|---|---|---|
| Fingerhuth 16'; Stein 41'; Kuhlenthal 65'; Montegu 67' | Report | Stott 14'; Webster 38'; Burns 44'; Forsyth 60'; Marwaha 85' |

===== Ninth and tenth place =====
28 July 2001
17:30

| Wales | 1–2 | France |
|---|---|---|
| Westerman 15' | Report | Durchon 58'; Jeanjean 66' |

==== Fifth to eighth place classification ====
Crossover
28 July 2001
New Zealand | 0
Japan (a.e.t) | 1
28 July 2001
India | 2
Canada | 1

Fifth Place
29 July 2001
Japan | 3
India | 4
Seventh place
29 July 2001
New Zealand | 4
Canada | 0

===== Crossover =====
28 July 2001
10:00

| New Zealand | 0–1 (a.e.t.) | Japan |
|---|---|---|
| | Report | Tobita 75' |

28 July 2001
12:30

| India | 2–1 | Canada |
|---|---|---|
| Halappa 4'; Fernandes 42' | Report | Short 58' |

===== Seventh and eighth place =====
29 July 2001
12:30

| New Zealand | 4–0 | Canada |
|---|---|---|
| Parag 16', 69'; McIndoe 46'; Kosoof 66' | Report |

===== Fifth and sixth place =====
29 July 2001
13:30

| Japan | 3–4 | India |
|---|---|---|
| Yamabori 6', 11'; Kawada 30' | Report | Baljit 6', 8', 25', 46' |

==== First to fourth place classification ====
Semi-finals
27 July 2001
Spain | 5
Poland | 1
27 July 2001
Argentina | 4
Belgium | 2

Final
29 July 2001
Spain | 4
Argentina | 5
Third place
29 July 2001
Poland | 5
Belgium | 2

===== Crossover =====
27 July 2001
15:00

| Spain | 5–1 | Poland |
|---|---|---|
| Arnau 11'; Tubau 35', 52'; Escarré 46', 51' | Report | Gaczkowski 17' |

27 July 2001
17:30

| Argentina | 4–2 | Belgium |
|---|---|---|
| J. Lombi 9'; Almada 21', 38', 45' | Report | De Chaffoy 68'; Beunen 70' |

===== Third and fourth place =====
29 July 2001
10:00

| Poland | 5–2 | Belgium |
|---|---|---|
| Choczaj 26', 69'; Grzeszczak 41'; P. Mikuła 45', 66' | Report | Geens 24'; Beunen 47' |

===== Final =====
29 July 2001
15:00

| Spain | 4–5 | Argentina |
|---|---|---|
| Tubau 33'; Fábregas 48'; Amat 69'; Quintana 70' | Report | Almada 2'; J. Lombi 12', 58', 65'; Retegui 43' |

== Final rankings ==
As per statistical convention in field hockey, matches decided in regular time are counted as wins and losses, while matches decided by penalty shoot-outs are counted as draws.

| Pos | Team | Pld | W | D | L | GF | GA | GD | Pts | Qualification |
|---|---|---|---|---|---|---|---|---|---|---|
| 1st place, gold medalist(s) | Argentina | 8 | 8 | 0 | 0 | 35 | 15 | +20 | 24 | 2002 FIH World Cup |
| 2nd place, silver medalist(s) | Spain | 8 | 5 | 2 | 1 | 30 | 9 | +21 | 17 | 2002 FIH World Cup |
| 3rd place, bronze medalist(s) | Poland | 8 | 5 | 1 | 2 | 19 | 15 | +4 | 16 | 2002 FIH World Cup |
| 4 | Belgium | 8 | 2 | 3 | 3 | 14 | 14 | 0 | 9 | 2002 FIH World Cup |
| 5 | India | 8 | 5 | 0 | 3 | 17 | 14 | +3 | 15 | 2002 FIH World Cup |
| 6 | Japan | 8 | 3 | 1 | 4 | 12 | 17 | −5 | 10 | 2002 FIH World Cup |
| 7 | New Zealand | 8 | 5 | 1 | 2 | 16 | 9 | +7 | 16 | 2002 FIH World Cup |
| 8 | Canada | 8 | 2 | 1 | 5 | 13 | 18 | −5 | 7 | |
| 9 | France | 8 | 4 | 3 | 1 | 19 | 13 | +6 | 15 | |
| 10 | Wales | 8 | 4 | 1 | 3 | 12 | 11 | +1 | 13 | |
| 11 | Scotland (H) | 8 | 4 | 1 | 3 | 24 | 13 | +11 | 13 | |
| 12 | Chile | 8 | 1 | 2 | 5 | 14 | 32 | −18 | 5 | |
| 13 | Egypt | 8 | 3 | 1 | 4 | 14 | 18 | −4 | 10 | |
| 14 | United States | 8 | 2 | 0 | 6 | 11 | 19 | −8 | 6 | |
| 15 | Russia | 8 | 2 | 1 | 5 | 15 | 17 | −2 | 7 | |
| 16 | Bangladesh | 8 | 0 | 0 | 8 | 6 | 37 | −31 | 0 | |

Source: FIH
(H) Hosts
