= 2002 Men's Hockey Hamburg Masters =

Tournament details
- Host country: Germany
- City: Hamburg
- Teams: 4
- Venue(s): Uhlenhorster HC

Final positions
- Champions: Germany (7th title)
- Runner-up: Argentina
- Third place: Malaysia

Tournament statistics
- Matches played: 6
- Goals scored: 43 (7.17 per match)
- Top scorer(s): (Germany) Florian Kunz (4 goals)

The 2002 Men's Hockey Hamburg Masters was the eighth edition of the Hamburg Masters, consisting of a series of test matches. It was held in Hamburg, Germany, from 14 to 16 June 2002, and featured four of the top nations in men's field hockey.

== Competition format ==
The tournament featured the national teams of Argentina, Malaysia, Spain, and the hosts, Germany, competing in a round-robin format, with each team playing each other once. Three points were awarded for a win, one for a draw, and none for a loss.

Country	Best World Cup Finish	Best Olympic Games Finish
Argentina	Sixth Place (1986, 2002)	Fifth Place (1948)
Germany	Champions (2002)	Champions (1992)
Malaysia	Fourth Place (1975)	Eighth Place (1972, 1976)
Spain	Runners-Up (1971, 1998)	Runners-Up (1980, 1996)

== Officials ==
The following umpires were appointed by the International Hockey Federation to officiate the tournament:

- Xavier Adell (ESP)
- Henrik Ehlers (DEN)
- Edmundo Saladino (ARG)
- Amarjit Singh (MAS)
- Richard Wölter (GER)

== Results ==
All times are local (Central European Summer Time).

=== Pool ===
Pos	Team	Pld	W	D	L	GF	GA	GD	Pts	Result
1	Germany (H)	3	3	0	0	16	8	+8	9	Tournament Champion
2	Argentina	3	1	1	1	11	11	0	4	
3	Malaysia	3	0	2	1	7	13	−6	2	
4	Spain	3	0	1	2	9	11	−2	1	

Source: Deutscher Hockey-Bund
Rules for classification: 1) Points; 2) Goal difference; 3) Goals scored; 4) Games won; 5) Head-to-head.
(H) Hosts

=== Fixtures ===
14 June 2002
16:30

Spain	3–4	Argentina
A. Sala 4'; Ribas 6', 27'	Report	Almada 22'; MacCormik 34'; Paulón 36'; Cammareri 57'

Umpires:
Richard Wölter (GER)
Amarjit Singh (MAS)

14 June 2002
18:45

Germany	7–1	Malaysia
Witthaus 10', 70'; Michel 15'; Kunz 18'; Reinelt 26'; Domke 34'; Bechmann 59'	Report	Keevan 40'

Umpires:
Xavier Adell (ESP)
Henrik Ehlers (DEN)

15 June 2002
14:00

Spain	3–3	Malaysia
Sojo 30'; A. Sala 40'; Amat 47'	Report	Fairuz 11'; Keevan 64'; Fakhrul 64'

Umpires:
Edmundo Saladino (ARG)
Richard Wölter (GER)

15 June 2002
16:30

Argentina	4–5	Germany
Paredes 11', 56'; R. Vila 19'; Lombi 30'	Report	Witthaus 8'; Michel 10', 34'; Kunz 13'; Reinelt 35'

Umpires:
Henrik Ehlers (DEN)
Amarjit Singh (MAS)

16 June 2002
12:00

Argentina	3–3	Malaysia
Lombi 36', 46'; Zylberberg 63'	Report	Amin 7'; Azlan 54'; Chua 61'

Umpires:
Xavier Adell (ESP)
Richard Wölter (GER)

16 June 2002
14:30

Germany	4–3	Spain
Kunz 8', 43'; Emmerling 25'; Reinelt 31'	Report	Ribas 41'; Pérez 52'; Sojo 62'

Umpires:
Edmundo Saladino (ARG)
Henrik Ehlers (DEN)

== Statistics ==
=== Final standings ===
1. Germany
2. Argentina
3. Malaysia
4. Spain

=== Goalscorers ===
There were 43 goals scored in 6 matches, for an average of 7.17 goals per match.

4 goals

- (Germany) Florian Kunz

3 goals

- (Argentina) Jorge Lombi
- (Germany) Björn Michel
- (Germany) Sascha Reinelt
- (Germany) Matthias Witthaus
- (Spain) Xavier Ribas

2 goals

- (Argentina) Matías Paredes
- (Malaysia) Keevan Raj
- (Spain) Alberto Sala
- (Spain) Víctor Sojo

1 goal

- (Argentina) Mario Almada
- (Argentina) Lucas Cammareri
- (Argentina) Tomás MacCormik
- (Argentina) Ezequiel Paulón
- (Argentina) Rodrigo Vila
- (Argentina) Fernando Zylberberg
- (Germany) Christoph Bechmann
- (Germany) Oliver Domke
- (Germany) Björn Emmerling
- (Malaysia) Chua Boon Huat
- (Malaysia) Azlan Misron
- (Malaysia) Fakhrul Radzi
- (Malaysia) Amin Rahim
- (Malaysia) Fairuz Ramli
- (Spain) Pol Amat
- (Spain) Jaime Pérez
