= 2001 Men's Hockey Champions Trophy =

Field hockey tournament

Tournament details
- Host country: Netherlands
- City: Rotterdam
- Dates: 3–11 November
- Teams: 6
- Venue: Hazelaarweg Stadion

Final positions
- Champions: Germany (8th title)
- Runner-up: Australia
- Third place: Netherlands

Tournament statistics
- Matches played: 18
- Goals scored: 90 (5 per match)
- Top scorer: (Germany) Florian Kunz (10 goals)
- Best player: (Germany) Florian Kunz

The 2001 Men's Hockey Champions Trophy was the 23rd edition of the Hockey Champions Trophy men's field hockey tournament. It was reorganised to take place in Rotterdam, Netherlands on the scheduled dates of 3–11 November 2001. The event will take place at HC Rotterdam’s brand new NLG 24 million, 8,000-seating facility, which opened in August and was the first world level event at the venue.

== Squads ==
Australia

Head Coach: Barry Dancer

1. Jamie Dwyer
2. Liam de Young
3. Adam Commens
5. Troy Elder
8. Lachlan Dreher (GK)
9. Jeremy Hiskins
10. Paul Gaudoin (c)
11. Ben Taylor
12. Matthew Smith
15. Bevan George
17. Craig Victory
19. Mark Hickman (GK)
20. Scott Webster
21. Aaron Hopkins
23. Matthew Wells
25. Brent Livermore
26. Dean Butler
27. Zain Wright
England
1. Jimi Lewis (GK)
3. Jon Wyatt
5. Bill Waugh
7. Duncan Woods
8. David Mathews
9. Mark Pearn
10. Jimmy Wallis
12. Jon Evennett
13. Danny Hall
16. Andy Humphrey
17. Jason Collins
18. Jerome Goudie
19. Michael Johnson (c)
20. Nick Taylor (GK)
22. Danny Haydon
23. Tom Bertram
24. Mani Kochar
26. Robert Todd
Germany

Head Coach: Bernhard Peters

1. Clemens Arnold (GK)
2. Christopher Reitz (GK)
3. Tobias Hentschel
4. Philipp Crone
5. Jamilon Mülders
6. Christian Wein
7. Björn Michel
8. Sascha Reinelt
9. Oliver Domke
10. Christoph Eimer
11. Björn Emmerling
12. Sebastian Biederlack
13. Michael Green
14. Tibor Weißenborn
15. Florian Kunz (c)
16. Christian Mayerhöfer
17. Florian Keller
18. Eike Duckwitz
Netherlands
1. Guus Vogels (GK)
2. Bram Lomans
3. Diederik van Weel
6. Marc van Wijk
7. Sander van der Weide
8. Ronald Brouwer
9. Piet-Hein Geeris
11. Marten Eikelboom
12. Jeroen Delmee (c)
13. Josef Kramer (GK)
14. Teun de Nooijer
15. Remco van Wijk
19. Matthijs Brouwer
21. Karel Klaver
22. Friso Jiskoot
23. Rob Derikx
24. Taeke Taekema
25. Menno Booij
Pakistan
1. Muhammad Qasim (GK)
3. Tariq Imran
5. Sohail Abbas
7. Ali Raza
9. Muhammad Usman
10. Muhammad Saqlain
11. Waseem Ahmed
12. Salman Akbar (GK)
13. Dilawar Hussain
15. Imran Rasool
17. Muhammad Nadeem (c)
19. Mudassar Ali
21. Atif Bashir
23. Muhammad Sarwar
25. Kashif Jawad
27. Shahbaz Ahmed
29. Muhammad Shabbir
31. Naveed Iqbal
South Korea
1. Lim Jong-chun (GK)
2. Shin Seok-kyo
3. Kim Chul
4. Lee Jung-seon
5. Kim Yong-bae
6. Kang Seong-jung
7. Yeo Woon-kon
8. Kim Jung-chul
9. Song Seung-tae
10. Seo Jong-ho
11. Hwang Jong-hyun
12. Lim Jung-woo
14. Han Hyung-bae
15. Kim Kyung-seok
16. Kim Yoon (GK)
17. Yoo Moon-ki
18. Yang Soo-kyuk
20. Kang Keon-wook

== Results ==
All times are Central European Time (UTC+01:00)

=== Pool ===
Team	Pld	W	D	L	GF	GA	GD	Pts
Germany	5	5	0	0	15	7	+8	15
Australia	5	4	0	1	15	10	+5	12
Pakistan	5	2	1	2	14	12	+2	7
Netherlands	5	2	1	2	11	11	0	7
England	5	1	0	4	11	17	−6	3
South Korea	5	0	0	5	8	17	−9	0

3 November 2001
12:00

England	4–3	South Korea
Wallis 26'; Matthews 46', 50', 53'	Report	Yeo Woon-kon 34'; Song Seung-tae 40'; Hwang Jong-hyun 45'

3 November 2001
14:30

Netherlands	1–1	Pakistan
Taekema 9'	Report	Abbas 27'

3 November 2001
17:00

Germany	2–1	Australia
Domke 41'; Kunz 60'	Report	Hiskins 8'

4 November 2001
12:30

Pakistan	2–0	South Korea
Jawad 6'	Report

4 November 2001
15:00

Australia	3–2	Netherlands
Dwyer 20'; Elder 58'; Smith 65'	Report	De Nooijer 6'; M. Brouwer 68'

4 November 2001
17:30

Germany	2–0	England
Kunz 7', 24'	Report

6 November 2001
14:30

Australia	3–1	Pakistan
Hiskins 42', 55'; Commens 68'	Report	Abbas 66'

6 November 2001
17:00

Germany	3–0	South Korea
Kunz 14', 46'; Domke 63'	Report

6 November 2001
19:30

England	2–3	Netherlands
Hall 44'; Pearn 55'	Report	De Nooijer 18'; Eikelboom 21'; Delmee 25'

7 November 2001
15:00

Pakistan	4–5	Germany
Abbas 34', 35', 51'; Sarwar 56'	Report	Domke 5'; Green 28'; Kunz 30', 54'; Wein 32'

7 November 2001
17:30

Australia	3–2	England
Wells 21'; Elder 28'; Hiskins 53'	Report	Collins 26'; Wallis 41'

7 November 2001
20:00

South Korea	2–3	Netherlands
Kang Keon-wook 13'; Lee Jung-seon 24'	Report	De Nooijer 35'; M. Brouwer 38'; Geeris 42'

10 November 2001
10:00

South Korea	3–5	Australia
Yeo Woon-kon 35'; Kang Keon-wook 55'; Lee Jung-seon 68'	Report	Victory 20'; Commens 36'; Elder 36', 49'; Webster 67'

10 November 2001
12:00

Netherlands	2–3	Germany
Taekema 47'; Klaver 68'	Report	Michel 2'; Reinelt 38'; Kunz 59'

10 November 2001
13:30

England	3–6	Pakistan
Pearn 15'; Wyatt 24'; Hall 53'	Report	Abbas 7', 35'; Jawad 35', 60', 69'; Nadeem 64'

=== Classification ===
==== Fifth and sixth place ====
11 November 2001
12:00

England	3–3 (a.e.t.)	South Korea
Hall 32'; Goudie 64'; Pearn 66'	Report	Lee Jung-seon 7'; Hwang Jong-hyun 51'; Song Seung-tae 65'
Penalties
Hall (penalty shoot-out missed); Matthews (penalty shoot-out scored); Wyatt (penalty shoot-out scored); Bertram (penalty shoot-out scored)	3–2	(penalty shoot-out scored) Yeo Woon-kon; (penalty shoot-out scored) Kim Kyung-seok; (penalty shoot-out missed) Shin Seok-kyo; (penalty shoot-out missed) Lee Jung-seon; (penalty shoot-out missed) Kang Seong-jung

==== Third and fourth place ====
11 November 2001
11:00

Pakistan	2–5	Netherlands
	Report

==== Final ====
11 November 2001
13:30

Germany	2–1	Australia
Kunz 35', 46'	Report	Smith 45'

== Awards ==
Topscorer	Player of the Tournament
(Germany) Florian Kunz	(Germany) Florian Kunz

== Final standings ==
1. Germany
2. Australia
3. Netherlands
4. Pakistan
5. England
6. South Korea
