= Paul Woolford =

Paul Woolford may refer to:

- Paul Woolford (field hockey) (born 1977), New Zealand field hockey player
- Paul Woolford (DJ), UK dance music producer
