= 2002 World Cup (disambiguation) =

The 2002 FIFA World Cup was the 17th edition of the FIFA international association football tournament.

2002 World Cup may also refer to:

- Alpine skiing – 2002 Alpine Skiing World Cup
- Athletics (track and field) – 2002 IAAF World Cup
- Field Hockey:
  - 2002 Men's World Hockey Cup
  - 2002 Women's World Hockey Cup
- Rugby Union – 2002 Women's Rugby World Cup
