= Paul Woolford (field hockey) =

New Zealand field hockey player

Personal information
- Born: 1 June 1977 (age 49)
Medal record
Men's field hockey
Representing New Zealand
Commonwealth Games
Silver medal – second place	2002 Manchester	Team competition
Champions Challenge
Silver medal – second place	2007 Boom	Team competition

Paul Matthew Woolford (born 1 June 1977 in Auckland) is a field hockey player from New Zealand, who earned his first cap for the national team, nicknamed The Black Sticks, in 1999. He won a silver medal at the 2002 Commonwealth Games in Manchester.

== International senior tournaments ==
- 2000 – Sultan Azlan Shah Cup
- 2000 – Olympic Qualifying Tournament
- 2001 – World Cup Qualifier
- 2002 – World Cup
- 2002 – Commonwealth Games
- 2003 – Sultan Azlan Shah Cup
- 2003 – Champions Challenge
- 2004 – Olympic Qualifying Tournament
- 2004 – Summer Olympics
- 2004 – Champions Trophy
- 2005 – Sultan Azlan Shah Cup
- 2006 – Commonwealth Games
- 2006 – World Cup
- 2007 – Champions Challenge
- 2008 – Olympic Games
