= 2001 Men's Oceania Cup =

Field hockey tournament

2001 Oceania Cup
Tournament details
- Host country: Australia
- City: Melbourne
- Dates: 10–13 May
- Venue: Victorian Hockey Centre

Final positions
- Champions: Australia (2nd title)
- Runner-up: New Zealand

Tournament statistics
- Matches played: 3
- Goals scored: 13 (4.33 per match)
- Top scorer: 4 Players (see list below) (2 goals)

The 2001 Men's Oceania Cup was the second edition of the men's field hockey tournament. It was held from 10 to 13 May in Melbourne.

The tournament served as a qualifier for the 2002 FIH World Cup.

Australia won the tournament for the second time, defeating New Zealand in the three–game series, with two wins and one draw.

== Results ==
All times are local (AEST).

=== Pool ===
Pos	Team	Pld	W	D	L	GF	GA	GD	Pts	Qualification
1	Australia	3	2	1	0	8	5	+3	7	2002 FIH World Cup
2	New Zealand	3	0	1	2	5	8	−3	1	

Source: Hockey Australia
Rules for classification: 1) points; 2) goal difference; 3) goals scored; 4) head-to-head result.

=== Fixtures ===
10 May 2001
19:00

Australia	3–1	New Zealand
Vivian-Taylor 1'; Gaudoin 24'; Dwyer 51'	Report	Leaver 34'

Umpires:
Richard Wölter (GER)
Xavier Adell (ESP)

12 May 2001
15:00

Australia	1–1	New Zealand
Dwyer 12'	Report	Hari 49'

Umpires:
Xavier Adell (ESP)
Richard Wölter (GER)

13 May 2001
15:00

Australia	4–3	New Zealand
Gaudoin 11'; Hiskins 46'; Taylor 49'; Vivian-Taylor 60'	Report	Leaver 14'; Burrows 58'; Parag 63'

Umpires:
Xavier Adell (ESP)
Richard Wölter (GER)

== Statistics ==
=== Final standings ===
1. Australia
2. New Zealand

=== Goalscorers ===
There were 13 goals scored in 3 matches, for an average of 4.33 goals per match.

2 goals

- (Australia) Jamie Dwyer
- (Australia) Paul Gaudoin
- (Australia) Lachlan Vivian-Taylor
- (New Zealand) Brett Leaver

1 goal

- (Australia) Jeremy Hiskins
- (Australia) Benjamin Taylor
- (New Zealand) Phil Burrows
- (New Zealand) Bevan Hari
- (New Zealand) Umesh Parag
