= Jamilon Mülders =

German field hockey player and coach

Personal information
- Born: 29 May 1976 (age 50)

Sport
- Sport: Field hockey
Medal record
Men's field hockey
Representing Germany
World Cup
Gold medal – first place	2002 Kuala Lumpur	Team
Champions Trophy
Gold medal – first place	2001 Rotterdam	Team

Jamilon Mülders (born 29 May 1976) is a German field hockey coach and a former player for the Germany national team. He is the former coach for the Chinese national team. Jamilon is the current coach of the Dutch ladies national team.

He coached the Germany national team at the 2016 Summer Olympics, where the team won the bronze medal.
