= 1996 Men's Hockey Champions Trophy =

Kuber Champions Trophy

Tournament details
- Host country: India
- City: Madras
- Dates: 7–15 December
- Teams: 6
- Venue(s): Mayor Radhakrishnan Stadium

Final positions
- Champions: Netherlands (3rd title)
- Runner-up: Pakistan
- Third place: Germany

Tournament statistics
- Matches played: 18
- Goals scored: 74 (4.11 per match)
- Top scorer(s): (Germany) Christoph Bechmann (5 goals)

The 1996 Men's Hockey Champions Trophy, also known as the Kuber Champions Trophy for sponsorship reasons, was the 18th edition of the Hockey Champions Trophy men's field hockey tournament. It was held from 7–15 December 1996 in the newly built Mayor Radhakrishnan Stadium in Madras, India.

== Host selection ==
India won the right to host the competition after Spain, the other contender, withdrew their bid in April 1994. The Asian Hockey Federation was tasked to monitor the competition by the International Hockey Federation.

== Results ==
All times are India Standard Time (UTC+05:30)

=== Pool ===
Team	Pld	W	D	L	GF	GA	GD	Pts
Netherlands	5	3	2	0	10	3	+7	11
Pakistan	5	3	1	1	13	10	+3	10
Germany	5	3	0	2	12	11	+1	9
India	5	2	1	2	10	7	+3	7
Australia	5	0	2	3	6	12	−6	2
Spain	5	0	2	3	6	14	−8	2

7 December 1996
08:30

India	1–2	Germany
Pillay 27'	Report	Michel 32'; Reinelt 42'

Umpires:
Santiago Deo (ESP)
Steve Graham (WAL)

7 December 1996
13:30

Pakistan	0–2	Netherlands
	Report	Van Pelt 62'; De Nooijer 64'

Umpires:
Ermanno Silvano (ITA)
Murray Grime (AUS)

7 December 1996
15:30

Spain	1–1	Australia
Usoz 66'	Report	Hiskins 67'

Umpires:
Shakeel Qureshi (IND)
Peter Elders (NED)

8 December 1996
13:45

Australia	2–4	Pakistan
Choppy 32'; Hiskins 49'	Report	R. Khan 21'; Ashraf 28'; Usman 48'; Raza 52'

Umpires:
Santiago Deo (ESP)
Toshimichi Fujimura (JPN)

8 December 1996
15:45

Spain	0–3	India
	Report	Kumar 16'; Pillay 38', 47'

Umpires:
Alan Waterman (CAN)
Irfan Zaidi (PAK)

8 December 1996
15:30

Netherlands	2–1	Germany
Brinkman 10'; Van Wijk 68'	Report	Michel 59'

Umpires:
Ermanno Silvano (ITA)
Murray Grime (AUS)

10 December 1996
08:35

Pakistan	2–2	Spain
Anis 26'; Ashraf 44'	Report	Pujol 63'; Escarré 68'

Umpires:
Steve Graham (WAL)
Shakeel Qureshi (IND)

10 December 1996
13:30

Netherlands	1–1	India
Lomans 47'	Report	Ferreira 69'

Umpires:
Murray Grime (AUS)
Santiago Deo (ESP)

10 December 1996
15:30

Germany	3–1	Australia
Hollensteiner 18'; Michel 40'; Reinelt 62'	Report	Kingston 50'

Umpires:
Peter Elders (NED)
Irfan Zaidi (PAK)

11 December 1996
15:30

India	3–1	Australia
Ramandeep Singh 40', 42'; Ferreira 47'	Report	Stacy 6'

Umpires:
Toshimichi Fujimura (JPN)
Steve Graham (WAL)

12 December 1996
08:35

Netherlands	4–0	Spain
De Nooijer 8'; Buma 26', 51'; Lomans 60'	Report

Umpires:
Irfan Zaidi (PAK)
Alan Waterman (CAN)

12 December 1996
15:30

Pakistan	4–2	Germany
M. Khan 12'; R. Khan 2', 61'; Ashraf 49'	Report	Bechmann 67'; Helwig 70'

Umpires:
Murray Grime (AUS)
Ermanno Silvano (ITA)

13 December 1996
08:35

Netherlands	1–1	Australia
Buma 10'	Report	Choppy 61'

Umpires:
Irfan Zaidi (PAK)
Shakeel Qureshi (IND)

13 December 1996
13:30

Germany	4–3	Spain
Bellenbaum 22'; Rott 24'; Hollensteiner 32'; Bechmann 48'	Report	Fábregas 11'; Ja. Arnau 33'; Escarré 64'

Umpires:
Toshimichi Fujimura (JPN)
Murray Grime (AUS)

13 December 1996
15:45

Pakistan	3–2	India
M. Khan 6'; Kaleem 26'; Ashraf 38'	Report	Aldrin 14'; Pargat Singh 50'

Umpires:
Peter Elders (NED)
Steve Graham (WAL)

=== Classification ===
==== Fifth and sixth place ====
15 December 1996
08:35

Spain	5–2	Australia
Ferran 12'; P. Amat 30'; Escarre 55'; Arnau 62', 70'	Report	Williams 16'; Hiskins 66'

Umpires:
Peter Elders (NED)
Shakeel Qureshi (IND)

==== Third and fourth place ====
15 December 1996
13:00

Germany	5–0	India
Reinelt 28'; Bechmann 30', 52', 62'; Waldhauser 70'	Report

Umpires:
Toshimichi Fujimura (JPN)
Alan Waterman (CAN)

==== Final ====
15 December 1996
15:30

Netherlands	3–2	Pakistan
De Nooijer 9'; Van Pelt 13'; Lomans 20'	Report	R. Khan 26'; Usman 28'

Umpires:
Santiago Deo (ESP)
Steve Graham (WAL)

== Final standings ==
1. Netherlands
2. Pakistan
3. Germany
4. India
5. Spain
6. Australia
