= Scott Webster (field hockey) =

Australian field hockey player

Medal record

Representing Australia

Men's field hockey

World Cup
| Silver medal – second place | 2002 Kuala Lumpur | Team |

Champions Trophy
| Gold medal – first place | 1999 Brisbane | Team |
| Silver medal – second place | 2001 Rotterdam | Team |
| Bronze medal – third place | 1998 Lahore | Team |

Commonwealth Games
| Gold medal – first place | 2002 Manchester | Team |

Scott Webster (born 2 June 1976), is a field hockey player from Australia, who was a member of the team that won the silver medal at the 2002 Men's Hockey World Cup.

== School ==
At school level Scott represented Christ Church Grammar School in the Public Schools Association Ray House Hockey Cup competition. He was selected to represent the PSA Combined XI (as Captain) against the HOTSPURS in 1993, in which the PSA Combined Team was victorious.

== Club ==
At club level Scott plays for The University of Western Australia Hockey Club (UWAHC) as well as Suburban Nedlands Hockey Club.

== National ==
Scott has represented Western Australia at both underage and open levels, playing for the SmokeFree WA Thundersticks from 1995 to 2004, which included winning National titles in 1995, 1999, 2000, and 2002.

== International ==
Scott has represented Australia (Kookaburras) at senior and Junior (Under 21) level. He has played a total of 80 matches and scored 20 goals.

Including:
2002 Hockey World Cup Silver Medal
2002 Champions Trophy 5th
2001 Champions Trophy 2nd
1999 Champions Trophy 1st
1998 Champions Trophy 3rd
2002 Commonwealth Games Gold Medal
1997 Junior Hockey World Cup Gold Medal
