= Piet-Hein Geeris =

Dutch field hockey player (born 1972)

Personal information
- Full name: Piet-Hein Willem Geeris
- Born: 29 March 1972 (age 54) Boxtel, Netherlands

Sport
- Sport: Field hockey
Senior career
Years	Team	Caps	Goals
–	MEP	-	-
–	Cernusco	-	-
–	Tilburg	-	-
–	Den Bosch	-	-
–	Oranje Zwart	-	-
–	Royal Antwerp	-	-
National team
Years	Team	Caps	Goals
1993–2004	Netherlands	194	(29)
Medal record
Men's field hockey
Representing the Netherlands
Olympic Games
Gold medal – first place	2000 Sydney	Team
World Cup
Gold medal – first place	1998 Utrecht	Team
Bronze medal – third place	2002 Kuala Lumpur	Team
Champions Trophy
Gold medal – first place	1998 Lahore	Team
Gold medal – first place	2000 Amstelveen	Team
Gold medal – first place	2002 Cologne	Team
Gold medal – first place	2003 Amstelveen	Team
Bronze medal – third place	1993 Kuala Lumpur	Team
Bronze medal – third place	1999 Brisbane	Team
Bronze medal – third place	2001 Rotterdam	Team

Piet-Hein Willem Geeris (born 29 March 1972 in Boxtel) is a former Dutch field hockey player, who played 194 international matches for the Netherlands, in which he scored 29 goals. The forward and midfielder made his debut for the Dutch on 5 May 1993 in a friendly match against Ireland. His last appearance in the Holland squad came just before the 2004 Summer Olympics in Athens.

Geeris played in the Dutch League for MEP, HC Tilburg, HC Den Bosch and Oranje Zwart. In between he also went to Italy, and played for Cernusco. He stopped competing at top level in the spring of 2004, and then continued playing in Belgium.
