= Jeremy Hiskins =

Australian field hockey player

Personal information
- Born: 16 October 1975 (age 50) Victoria, Australia

Sport
- Sport: Field hockey
- Position: Forward
Senior career
Years	Team	Caps	Goals
–2002	Victorian Vikings	-	-
National team
Years	Team	Caps	Goals
1995–2002	Australia	96	(35)
Medal record
Men's field hockey
Representing Australia
FIH World Cup
Silver medal – second place	2002 Kuala Lumpur	Team
Oceania Cup
Gold medal – first place	1998 Kuala Lumpur	Team
Oceania Cup
Gold medal – first place	1999 Brisbane	Team
Gold medal – first place	2001 Melbourne	Team
FIH Champions Trophy
Silver medal – second place	1997 Adelaide	Team
Silver medal – second place	2001 Rotterdam	Team
East Asian Games
Gold medal – first place	2001 Osaka	Team

Jeremy Hiskins (born 16 October 1975) is a former international field hockey player from Australia.

== Personal life ==
Hiskins is the son of former Australian tennis player Ken Hiskins.

== Career ==
=== National league ===
In Hockey Australia's former national league, the Australian Hockey League, also formerly known as the National Hockey League, Hiskins represented his home state as a member of the Melbourne Redbacks.

He was also a member of the Doncaster Hockey Club.

=== Kookaburras ===
He made his senior international debut for the Kookaburras in 1995. He earned his first senior cap during a Six Nations Tournament in New Delhi, making his debut in a test match against Poland.

In 1996 he appeared at his first major international tournament, competing at the FIH Champions Trophy in Madras.

The following year in 1997, Hiskins made his most international appearances to date, and he also his first medal with the national squad in 1997, taking home silver at his second FIH Champions Trophy held in Adelaide.

He won his first gold in 1998, taking home gold at the XVI Commonwealth Games in Kuala Lumpur.

Hiskins continued representing the national team until his retirement in 2002. Throughout the rest of his career, he won gold medals at the 1999 and 2001 editions of the Oceania Cup, held in Brisbane and Melbourne, respectively, as well as the 2001 East Asian Games in Osaka. He also won silver medals at the 2001 FIH Champions Trophy in Rotterdam and the 2002 FIH World Cup in Kuala Lumpur.
