= Phil Burrows (field hockey) =

New Zealand field hockey player (born 1980)

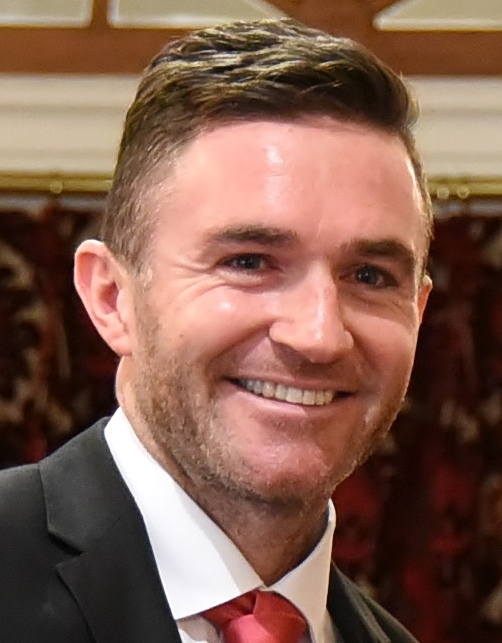
- Burrows in 2017

Personal information
- Full name: Phillip Ross Burrows
- Born: 25 April 1980 (age 46) Wellington, New Zealand

Sport
- Sport: Field hockey
- Position: Forward
Senior career
Years	Team	Caps	Goals
2004–2005	Breda	-	-
2005–2010	Rotterdam	-	-
2010–2012	Braxgata	-	-
2012–2016	HGC	-	-
National team
Years	Team	Caps	Goals
2000–2015	New Zealand	343	(150)
Medal record
Men's field hockey
Representing New Zealand
Men's Oceania Cup
Silver medal – second place	2007 Buderim
Silver medal – second place	2011 Hobart
Silver medal – second place	2013 Stratford
Commonwealth Games
Silver medal – second place	2002 Manchester	Team
Bronze medal – third place	2010 Delhi	Team

Phillip Ross Burrows MNZM (born 25 April 1980) is a field hockey player from New Zealand, who earned his first cap for the national team, nicknamed The Black Sticks, in January 2000. The striker is New Zealand's top field goal scorer.

Since his debut, he has competed in over 120 international games for his country and appeared in three Summer Olympics: in 2004 in Athens, in 2008 in Beijing and in 2012 in London.

He has played club hockey in The Netherlands since 2004, initially for Breda and since the summer of 2005, for HC Rotterdam. In the summer of 2010 he went to Braxgata in Belgium. In 2012 he returned to the Netherlands to play for HGC.

== International senior tournaments ==
- 2000 – Sultan Azlan Shah Cup
- 2000 – Olympic Qualifying Tournament
- 2001 – World Cup Qualifier
- 2002 – World Cup
- 2002 – Commonwealth Games
- 2003 – Sultan Azlan Shah Cup
- 2003 – Champions Challenge
- 2004 – Olympic Qualifying Tournament
- 2004 – Olympic Games
- 2004 – Champions Trophy
- 2005 – Sultan Azlan Shah Cup
- 2006 – Commonwealth Games
- 2006 – World Cup Qualifier
- 2006 – World Cup
- 2007 – Champions Challenge
- 2008 – Olympic Games
- 2010 − Commonwealth Games
- 2012 – Olympic Games

== International goals ==
No.	Date	Venue	Opponent	Score	Result	Competition
1.	10 March 2000	Osaka, Japan	Great Britain	2–2	2–2	2000 Men's Field Hockey Olympic Qualifier
2.	19 March 2000	Osaka, Japan	Belarus	2–0	6–3	2000 Men's Field Hockey Olympic Qualifier
3.	13 May 2001	Melbourne, Australia	Australia	2–3	3–4	2001 Men's Oceania Cup
4.	22 July 2001	Edinburgh, Scotland	Belgium	1–0	1–1	2001 Men's Intercontinental Cup
5.	25 July 2001	Edinburgh, Scotland	Canada	3–2	5–3	2001 Men's Intercontinental Cup
6.	25 July 2001	Edinburgh, Scotland	Canada	4–2	5–3	2001 Men's Intercontinental Cup
7.	3 March 2002	Kuala Lumpur, Malaysia	Argentina	1–1	1–3	2002 Men's Hockey World Cup
8.	7 March 2002	Kuala Lumpur, Malaysia	Japan	3–3	3–3 (a.e.t.) (7–6 p)	2002 Men's Hockey World Cup
9.	8 March 2002	Kuala Lumpur, Malaysia	India	2–1	2–1	2002 Men's Hockey World Cup
10.	28 July 2002	Manchester, England	Barbados	5–0	13–0	2002 Commonwealth Games
11.	2 August 2002	Manchester, England	Pakistan	4–1	7–1	2002 Commonwealth Games
12.	2 August 2002	Manchester, England	Pakistan	6–1	7–1	2002 Commonwealth Games
13.	2 August 2002	Manchester, England	Pakistan	7–1	7–1	2002 Commonwealth Games
14.	4 August 2002	Manchester, England	Australia	1–4	2–5	2002 Commonwealth Games
15.	24 March 2003	Ipoh, Malaysia	Malaysia	3–1	4–2	2003 Sultan Azlan Shah Cup
16.	26 March 2003	Ipoh, Malaysia	South Korea	3–1	3–2	2003 Sultan Azlan Shah Cup
17.	30 March 2003	Ipoh, Malaysia	South Korea	2–2	3–2	2003 Sultan Azlan Shah Cup
18.	25 July 2003	Johannesburg, South Africa	England	1–0	4–0	2003 Men's Hockey Champions Challenge
19.	25 July 2003	Johannesburg, South Africa	England	3–0	4–0	2003 Men's Hockey Champions Challenge
20.	20 September 2003	Wellington, New Zealand	Australia	3–2	3–4	2003 Men's Oceania Cup
21.	21 September 2003	Wellington, New Zealand	Australia	1–0	1–4	2003 Men's Oceania Cup
22.	4 March 2004	Madrid, Spain	Canada	2–0	4–2	2004 Men's Field Hockey Olympic Qualifier
23.	4 March 2004	Madrid, Spain	Canada	4–0	4–2	2004 Men's Field Hockey Olympic Qualifier
24.	6 March 2004	Madrid, Spain	Belgium	2–1	2–2	2004 Men's Field Hockey Olympic Qualifier
25.	17 August 2004	Athens, Greece	Netherlands	3–3	3–4	2004 Summer Olympics
26.	19 August 2004	Athens, Greece	Argentina	3–1	3–1	2004 Summer Olympics
27.	21 August 2004	Athens, Greece	India	1–0	2–1	2004 Summer Olympics
28.	23 August 2004	Athens, Greece	South Africa	4–1	4–1	2004 Summer Olympics
29.	25 August 2004	Athens, Greece	South Korea	1–1	4–3	2004 Summer Olympics
30.	25 August 2004	Athens, Greece	South Korea	3–3	4–3	2004 Summer Olympics
31.	25 August 2004	Athens, Greece	South Korea	4–3	4–3	2004 Summer Olympics
32.	8 December 2004	Lahore, Pakistan	Germany	1–0	1–1	2004 Men's Hockey Champions Trophy
33.	30 May 2005	Ipoh, Malaysia	South Africa	1–0	2–0	2005 Sultan Azlan Shah Cup
34.	1 June 2005	Ipoh, Malaysia	Malaysia	1–0	3–1	2005 Sultan Azlan Shah Cup
35.	2 June 2005	Ipoh, Malaysia	South Korea	1–0	4–6	2005 Sultan Azlan Shah Cup
36.	15 November 2005	Suva, Fiji	Australia	1–0	2–4	2005 Men's Oceania Cup
37.	16 November 2005	Suva, Fiji	Fiji	4–0	16–0	2005 Men's Oceania Cup
38.	16 November 2005	Suva, Fiji	Fiji	5–0	16–0	2005 Men's Oceania Cup
39.	16 November 2005	Suva, Fiji	Fiji	6–0	16–0	2005 Men's Oceania Cup
40.	16 November 2005	Suva, Fiji	Fiji	8–0	16–0	2005 Men's Oceania Cup
41.	16 November 2005	Suva, Fiji	Fiji	12–0	16–0	2005 Men's Oceania Cup
42.	16 November 2005	Suva, Fiji	Fiji	16–0	16–0	2005 Men's Oceania Cup
43.	20 March 2006	Birmingham, England	Scotland	2–0	5–0	2006 Commonwealth Games
44.	20 March 2006	Birmingham, England	Scotland	4–0	5–0	2006 Commonwealth Games
45.	24 March 2006	Birmingham, England	India	1–1	2–1 (a.e.t.)	2006 Commonwealth Games
46.	12 April 2006	Changzhou, China	China	1–0	4–1	2006 Men's Intercontinental Cup
47.	12 April 2006	Changzhou, China	China	3–0	4–1	2006 Men's Intercontinental Cup
48.	14 April 2006	Changzhou, China	Japan	4–0	4–2	2006 Men's Intercontinental Cup
49.	18 April 2006	Changzhou, China	South Korea	1–1	1–1	2006 Men's Intercontinental Cup
50.	24 June 2007	Boom, Belgium	Japan	4–0	4–0	2007 Men's Hockey Champions Challenge
51.	30 June 2007	Boom, Belgium	Argentina	1–0	3–3	2007 Men's Hockey Champions Challenge
52.	12 September 2007	Buderim, Australia	Papua New Guinea	2–0	39–0	2007 Men's Oceania Cup
53.	12 September 2007	Buderim, Australia	Papua New Guinea	6–0	39–0	2007 Men's Oceania Cup
54.	12 September 2007	Buderim, Australia	Papua New Guinea	10–0	39–0	2007 Men's Oceania Cup
55.	12 September 2007	Buderim, Australia	Papua New Guinea	11–0	39–0	2007 Men's Oceania Cup
56.	12 September 2007	Buderim, Australia	Papua New Guinea	14–0	39–0	2007 Men's Oceania Cup
57.	12 September 2007	Buderim, Australia	Papua New Guinea	23–0	39–0	2007 Men's Oceania Cup
58.	12 September 2007	Buderim, Australia	Papua New Guinea	30–0	39–0	2007 Men's Oceania Cup
59.	12 September 2007	Buderim, Australia	Papua New Guinea	38–0	39–0	2007 Men's Oceania Cup
60.	2 February 2008	North Shore City, New Zealand	Trinidad and Tobago	5–0	12–0	2008 Summer Olympics qualification
61.	2 February 2008	North Shore City, New Zealand	Trinidad and Tobago	12–0	12–0	2008 Summer Olympics qualification
62.	5 February 2008	North Shore City, New Zealand	United States	1–0	4–0	2008 Summer Olympics qualification
63.	5 February 2008	North Shore City, New Zealand	United States	4–0	4–0	2008 Summer Olympics qualification
64.	9 February 2008	North Shore City, New Zealand	France	2–0	2–0	2008 Summer Olympics qualification
65.	8 May 2008	Ipoh, Malaysia	India	3–2	4–3	2008 Sultan Azlan Shah Cup
66.	9 May 2008	Ipoh, Malaysia	Pakistan	1–0	3–6	2008 Sultan Azlan Shah Cup
67.	27 August 2009	Invercargill, New Zealand	Samoa	?–0	19–0	2009 Men's Oceania Cup
68.	27 August 2009	Invercargill, New Zealand	Samoa	?–0	19–0	2009 Men's Oceania Cup
69.	27 August 2009	Invercargill, New Zealand	Samoa	?–0	19–0	2009 Men's Oceania Cup
70.	27 August 2009	Invercargill, New Zealand	Samoa	?–0	19–0	2009 Men's Oceania Cup
71.	27 August 2009	Invercargill, New Zealand	Samoa	?–0	19–0	2009 Men's Oceania Cup
72.	7 November 2009	Invercargill, New Zealand	Wales	5–2	6–2	2009 Men's Hockey World Cup Qualifiers
73.	8 November 2009	Invercargill, New Zealand	Scotland	3–0	8–0	2009 Men's Hockey World Cup Qualifiers
74.	8 November 2009	Invercargill, New Zealand	Scotland	4–0	8–0	2009 Men's Hockey World Cup Qualifiers
75.	10 November 2009	Invercargill, New Zealand	Malaysia	2–0	4–2	2009 Men's Hockey World Cup Qualifiers
76.	12 November 2009	Invercargill, New Zealand	China	3–0	6–1	2009 Men's Hockey World Cup Qualifiers
77.	14 November 2009	Invercargill, New Zealand	Austria	1–0	4–0	2009 Men's Hockey World Cup Qualifiers
78.	12 December 2009	Salta, Argentina	Argentina	2–1	3–2	2009 Men's Hockey Champions Challenge I
79.	13 December 2009	Salta, Argentina	Pakistan	2–1	4–2	2009 Men's Hockey Champions Challenge I
80.	13 December 2009	Salta, Argentina	Pakistan	4–2	4–2	2009 Men's Hockey Champions Challenge I
81.	3 March 2010	New Delhi, India	Netherlands	1–0	1–3	2010 Men's Hockey World Cup
82.	5 August 2010	Mönchengladbach, Germany	Spain	3–2	4–4	2010 Men's Hockey Champions Trophy
83.	6 October 2010	New Delhi, India	South Africa	2–0	4–2	2010 Commonwealth Games
84.	9 October 2010	New Delhi, India	England	1–1	3–5	2010 Commonwealth Games
85.	12 October 2010	New Delhi, India	Australia	2–4	2–6	2010 Commonwealth Games
86.	8 October 2011	Hobart, Australia	Australia	1–6	1–6	2011 Men's Oceania Cup
87.	5 December 2011	Auckland, New Zealand	South Korea	2–1	6–1	2011 Men's Hockey Champions Trophy
88.	6 December 2011	Auckland, New Zealand	Netherlands	2–3	3–3	2011 Men's Hockey Champions Trophy
89.	25 May 2012	Ipoh, Malaysia	Argentina	1–1	5–2	2012 Sultan Azlan Shah Cup
90.	1 August 2012	London, United Kingdom	India	2–1	3–1	2012 Summer Olympics
91.	4 December 2012	Melbourne, Australia	England	1–1	1–1	2012 Men's Hockey Champions Trophy
92.	8 December 2012	Melbourne, Australia	Germany	1–0	4–6	2012 Men's Hockey Champions Trophy
93.	2 November 2013	Stratford, New Zealand	Samoa	2–0	25–0	2013 Men's Oceania Cup
94.	2 November 2013	Stratford, New Zealand	Samoa	14–0	25–0	2013 Men's Oceania Cup
95.	2 November 2013	Stratford, New Zealand	Samoa	24–0	25–0	2013 Men's Oceania Cup
