= 2011 Men's Oceania Cup =

Field hockey tournament

2011 Oceania Cup
Tournament details
- Host country: Australia
- City: Hobart
- Dates: 6–9 October
- Venue: Tasmanian Hockey Centre

Final positions
- Champions: Australia (7th title)
- Runner-up: New Zealand

Tournament statistics
- Matches played: 3
- Goals scored: 16 (5.33 per match)
- Top scorer: (Australia) Glenn Turner (3 goals)

The 2011 Men's Oceania Cup was the seventh edition of the men's field hockey tournament. It was held from 6–9 October 2011 in Hobart.

The tournament served as a qualifier for the 2012 Summer Olympics.

Australia won the tournament for the seventh time, defeating New Zealand in the three–game series by goal difference, after the teams finished equal on points. Despite the Black Sticks' second place finish, the 2011 Oceania Cup held two qualifying allocations for the Olympic Games, meaning both teams qualified.

== Results ==
All times are local (AEDT).

=== Pool ===
| Pos | Team | Pld | W | D | L | GF | GA | GD | Pts | Qualification |
|---|---|---|---|---|---|---|---|---|---|---|
| 1 | Australia | 3 | 1 | 1 | 1 | 9 | 7 | +2 | 4 | 2012 Summer Olympics |
| 2 | New Zealand | 3 | 1 | 1 | 1 | 7 | 9 | −2 | 4 | 2012 Summer Olympics |

Source: Clearing House
Rules for classification: 1) points; 2) goal difference; 3) goals scored; 4) head-to-head result.

=== Fixtures ===
6 October 2011
17:30

| Australia | 0–3 | New Zealand |
|---|---|---|
| | Report | Inglis 8'; Hayward 57', 63' |

Umpires:
Javed Shaikh (IND)
Gary Simmonds (RSA)

8 October 2011
15:00

| Australia | 3–3 | New Zealand |
|---|---|---|
| Knowles 7'; Dwyer 38'; Ford 48' | Report | Child 36'; Hilton 44'; Wilson 50' |

Umpires:
Gary Simmonds (RSA)
Javed Shaikh (IND)

8 October 2011
15:30

| Australia | 6–1 | New Zealand |
|---|---|---|
| Ockenden 1'; Orchard 10'; Govers 16'; Turner 42', 55', 60' | Report | Burrows 66' |

Umpires:
Javed Shaikh (IND)
Gary Simmonds (RSA)

== Statistics ==
=== Final standings ===
1. Australia
2. New Zealand

=== Goalscorers ===
There were 16 goals scored in 3 matches, for an average of 5.33 goals per match.

3 goals

- (Australia) Glenn Turner

2 goals

- (New Zealand) Andrew Hayward

1 goal

- (Australia) Jamie Dwyer
- (Australia) Russell Ford
- (Australia) Kieran Govers
- (Australia) Mark Knowles
- (Australia) Edward Ockenden
- (Australia) Simon Orchard
- (New Zealand) Phil Burrows
- (New Zealand) Simon Child
- (New Zealand) Blair Hilton
- (New Zealand) Hugo Inglis
- (New Zealand) Nicholas Wilson
