= 2007 Men's Hockey Champions Challenge =

Field hockey tournament

Tournament details
- Host country: Belgium
- City: Boom
- Dates: 23 June – 1 July
- Teams: 6

Final positions
- Champions: Argentina (2nd title)
- Runner-up: New Zealand
- Third place: India

Tournament statistics
- Matches played: 18
- Goals scored: 93 (5.17 per match)
- Top scorer: (New Zealand) Hayden Shaw (9 goals)
- Best player: (New Zealand) Ryan Archibald

The 2007 Men's Hockey Champions Challenge took place in Boom, Belgium from June 23 to July 1, 2007.

This was the fourth edition of the tournament introduced in 2001 by the International Hockey Federation to broaden hockey's competitive base globally.

Argentina earned a spot at the 2008 Champions Trophy in Rotterdam, Netherlands after having defeated New Zealand in the final.

== Squads ==
Argentina

Head Coach: Sergio Vigil

1. Juan Manuel Vivaldi (GK)
2. Juan Gilardi
6. Mariano Chao (GK)
7. Mario Almada (c)
8. Lucas Rey
9. Rodrigo Vila
11. Lucas Cammareri
12. Lucas Vila
13. Jorge Lombi
14. Fernando Zylberberg
18. Juan Garreta
20. Tomás Argento
22. Matias Rey
24. Lucas Argento
26. Pedro Ibarra
27. Lucas Rossi
29. Agustin Corradini
31. Ignacio Bergner
Belgium

Head Coach: Giles Bonnet

1. Cédric Degreve (GK)
2. Xavier Reckinger
5. Jérôme Dekeyser
6. Loïc Vandeweghe
7. John-John Dohmen
8. Thomas van den Balck
9. Maxime Luycx
11. Charles Vandeweghe
14. Phillippe Goldberg
15. Gregory Gucassoff
16. Fabrice Bourdeaud'hui
17. Thomas Briels
18. Patrice Houssein
21. David van Rysselberghe (GK)
22. Simon Gougnard
26. Benjamin van Hove
27. Amaury de Cock
28. Jérôme Truyens
England

Head Coach: Jason Lee

3. Nick Brothers (GK)
4. Glenn Kirkham (c)
5. Richard Alexander
6. Richard Mantell
7. Ashley Jackson
8. Simon Mantell
9. Martin Jones
10. Matt Daly
11. Brett Garrard
12. Jonty Clarke
13. Rob Moore
14. Ben Hawes
15. Scott Cordon
18. Barry Middleton
20. James Tindall
21. Jon Bleby
24. Ben Marsden
25. James Fair (GK)
India

Head Coach: Joaquim Carvalho

1. Adrian D'Souza (GK)
2. Dilip Tirkey
3. Sandeep Singh
4. Shivendra Singh
5. Rajpal Singh
6. Prabodh Tirkey (c)
7. Bimal Lakra
8. Damandeep Singh
9. William Xalxo
10. Sunil Yadav
11. Sardara Singh
12. Prabhjot Singh
13. Gurbaj Singh
14. Bharat Chikkara
15. Tushar Khandker
16. Baljit Singh (GK)
17. Roshan Minz
18. Vickram Kanth
Japan

Head Coach: Akira Takahashi

2. Shunsuke Nagaoka (GK)
3. Kazuo Yoshida
4. Mitsuru Ito
5. Yutaka Bito
7. Kei Kawakami
8. Kenichi Katayama
9. Kazuyuki Ozawa (c)
10. Kazuhiro Tsubouchi
11. Hiroto Noda
12. Takahiko Yamabori
13. Ryuji Furusato
15. Akira Ito
17. Yuji Chaki
18. Keiji Maeda
19. Takayasu Mizawa
20. Katsuyoshi Nagasawa
21. Yoshihiro Anai
23. Katsuya Takase (GK)
New Zealand

Head Coach: Shane McLeod

3. David Kosoof
4. Nicholas Haig
5. Andrew Hayward
6. Simon Child
7. Blair Hopping
8. Dean Couzins
9. Casey Henwood
10. Ryan Archibald (c)
12. Bradley Shaw
14. Bevan Hari
16. Paul Woolford (GK)
17. Kyle Pontifex (GK)
18. Phil Burrows
19. Hayden Shaw
21. Bryce Collins
22. Lloyd Stephenson
30. Benjamin Collier
31. Steven Edwards

== Umpires ==
Below is the eight umpires appointed by International Hockey Federation (FIH):

- Chen Dekang (CHN)
- Eduardo Lizana (ESP)
- Kim Hong-Lae (KOR)
- Deon Nel (RSA)
- James Pilgrim (ENG)
- Raghu Prasad (IND)
- Simon Taylor (NZL)
- Gregory Uyttenhove (BEL)

== Results ==
All times are Central European Summer Time (UTC+02:00)

=== Pool ===
Pos	Team	Pld	W	D	L	GF	GA	GD	Pts	Qualification
1	New Zealand	5	3	2	0	15	7	+8	11	Final
2	Argentina	5	3	1	1	13	10	+3	10	Final
3	India	5	3	0	2	12	10	+2	9	Third Place Match
4	England	5	2	0	3	16	15	+1	6	Third Place Match
5	Belgium (H)	5	1	1	3	10	17	−7	4	Fifth Place Match
6	Japan	5	1	0	4	8	15	−7	3	Fifth Place Match

Source: FIH
Rules for classification: 1) points; 2) goal difference; 3) goals scored; 4) head-to-head result.
(H) Hosts

23 June 2007
13:45

India	0–2	New Zealand
	Report	H. Shaw 63'; Kosoof 69'

Umpires:
Kim Hong-Lae (KOR)
Deon Nel (RSA)

23 June 2007
16:00

Belgium	1–2	Japan
C. Vandeweghe 12'	Report	Furusato 16'; Yamabori 58'

Umpires:
James Pilgrim (ENG)
Raghu Prasad (IND)

23 June 2007
18:30

England	3–4	Argentina
Alexander 13'; S. Mantell 52'; Hawes 58'	Report	Lombi 40', 45'; L. Rey 45'; R. Vila 51'

Umpires:
Simon Taylor (NZL)
Gregory Uyttenhove (BEL)

24 June 2007
14:00

New Zealand	4–0	Japan
H. Shaw 31', 38'; Archibald 33'; Burrows 49'	Report

Umpires:
Raghu Prasad (IND)
Gregory Uyttenhove (BEL)

24 June 2007
16:15

Argentina	2–3	Belgium
Gilardi 40'; Lombi 68'	Report	Gucassoff 6', 32'; Briels 54'

Umpires:
Eduardo Lizana (ESP)
Deon Nel (RSA)

24 June 2007
18:45

India	3–2	England
Rajpal 28'; Dilip 41'; Prabhjot 54'	Report	R. Mantell 33'; Clarke 48'

Umpires:
Kim Hong-Lae (KOR)
Chen Dekang (CHN)

26 June 2007
14:30

Japan	0–2	Argentina
	Report	Ibarra 10'; R. Vila 15'

Umpires:
Chen Dekang (CHN)
Eduardo Lizana (ESP)

26 June 2007
16:45

England	1–3	New Zealand
Moore 43'	Report	H. Shaw 10', 48'; Couzins 62'

Umpires:
Deon Nel (RSA)
Raghu Prasad (IND)

26 June 2007
19:00

Belgium	1–4	India
Gucassoff 26'	Report	Sandeep 13'; Prabhjot 18'; Shivendra 31'; Dilip 68'

Umpires:
James Pilgrim (ENG)
Simon Taylor (NZL)

28 June 2007
14:30

England	4–3	Japan
R. Mantell 29'; Alexander 50'; Clarke 61'; Moore 66'	Report	Yamabori 10', 70+'; Anai 59'

Umpires:
Simon Taylor (NZL)
Gregory Uyttenhove (BEL)

28 June 2007
16:45

Argentina	2–1	India
Lombi 39'; Almada 60'	Report	Sandeep 64'

Umpires:
Chen Dekang (CHN)
James Pilgrim (ENG)

28 June 2007
19:00

New Zealand	3–3	Belgium
Child 14', 27'; Couzins 19'	Report	Briels 8'; Reckinger 17'; C. Vandeweghe 38'

Umpires:
Kim Hong-Lae (KOR)
Eduardo Lizana (ESP)

30 June 2007
11:30

New Zealand	3–3	Argentina
Burrows 15'; H. Shaw 46', 70'	Report	L. Vila 16', 69'; Garreta 27'

Umpires:
Chen Dekang (CHN)
Kim Hong-Lae (KOR)

30 June 2007
13:45

India	4–3	Japan
Sandeep 7'; Prabhjot 22', 34'; Dilip 48'	Report	Katayama 11'; Yamabori 47'; Tsubouchi 65'

Umpires:
James Pilgrim (ENG)
Gregory Uyttenhove (BEL)

30 June 2007
16:00

Belgium	2–6	England
Dekeyser 47'; Gucassoff 60'	Report	Jones 26'; Daly 28', 58'; S. Mantell 53', 70'; Clarke 65'

Umpires:
Deon Nel (RSA)
Raghu Prasad (IND)

=== Classification ===
==== Fifth and sixth place ====
1 July 2007
12:30

Belgium	3–4	Japan
Dekeyser 17', 21' de Cock 62'	Report	Nagasawa 25'; Yamabori 27'; Yoshida 57'; Anai 68'

Umpires:
Simon Taylor (NZL)
Chen Dekang (CHN)

==== Third and fourth place ====
1 July 2007
15:00

India	4–3	England
Khandker 3', 6'; Sandeep 14'; Minz 22'	Report	Moore 34'; Tindall 55'; S. Mantell 63'

Umpires:
Deon Nel (RSA)
Eduardo Lizana (ESP)

==== Final ====
1 July 2007
17:30

New Zealand	2–3 (a.e.t.)	Argentina
H. Shaw 44', 49'	Report	Lombi 66', 67', 75'

Umpires:
James Pilgrim (ENG)
Kim Hong-Lae (KOR)

== Awards ==
Top scorer	Player of the Tournament	Goalkeeper of the Tournament	Fair Play Trophy
(New Zealand) Hayden Shaw	(New Zealand) Ryan Archibald	(Belgium) Cédric Degreve	New Zealand

== Final rankings ==
As per statistical convention in field hockey, matches decided in extra time are counted as wins and losses, while matches decided by penalty shoot-outs are counted as draws.

Pos	Team	Pld	W	D	L	GF	GA	GD	Pts	Qualification
1st place, gold medalist(s)	Argentina	6	4	1	1	16	12	+4	13	Qualified for 2008 FIH Champions Trophy
2nd place, silver medalist(s)	New Zealand	6	3	2	1	17	10	+7	11	
3rd place, bronze medalist(s)	India	6	4	0	2	16	13	+3	12	
4	England	6	2	0	4	19	19	0	6	
5	Japan	6	2	0	4	12	18	−6	6	
6	Belgium (H)	6	1	1	4	13	21	−8	4	

Source: FIH
(H) Hosts

== Goalscorers ==
There were 93 goals scored in 18 matches, for an average of 5.17 goals per match.

9 goals

- (New Zealand) Hayden Shaw

7 goals

- (Argentina) Jorge Lombi

5 goals

- (Japan) Takahiko Yamabori

4 goals

- (Belgium) Gregory Gucassoff
- (England) Simon Mantell
- (India) Prabhjot Singh
- (India) Sandeep Singh

3 goals

- (Belgium) Jérôme Dekeyser
- (England) Jonathan Clarke
- (England) Robert Moore
- (India) Dilip Tirkey

2 goals

- (Argentina) Lucas Vila
- (Argentina) Rodrigo Vila
- (Belgium) Thomas Briels
- (Belgium) Charles Vandeweghe
- (England) Richard Alexander
- (England) Matthew Daly
- (England) Richard Mantell
- (India) Tushar Khandker
- (Japan) Yoshihiro Anai
- (New Zealand) Phillip Burrows
- (New Zealand) Simon Child
- (New Zealand) Dean Couzins

1 goal

- (Argentina) Mario Almada
- (Argentina) Juan Garreta
- (Argentina) Juan Gilardi
- (Argentina) Pedro Ibarra
- (Argentina) Lucas Rey
- (Belgium) Amaury de Cock
- (Belgium) Xavier Reckinger
- (England) Benjamin Hawes
- (England) Martin Jones
- (England) James Tindall
- (India) Roshan Minz
- (India) Rajpal Singh
- (India) Shivendra Singh
- (Japan) Ryuji Furusato
- (Japan) Kenichi Katayama
- (Japan) Katsuyoshi Nagasawa
- (Japan) Kazuhiro Tsubouchi
- (Japan) Kazuo Yoshida
- (New Zealand) Ryan Archibald
- (New Zealand) David Kosoof
