= Hymie Gill =

New Zealand field hockey player

Hymie Maxwell Gill
Personal information
- Nationality: New Zealand
- Born: August 4, 1973 (age 52) Dunedin, New Zealand
- Years active: 1990s–2000s

Sport
- Sport: Field hockey
- Team: New Zealand men's national field hockey team

Hymie Maxwell Gill (born 4 August 1973, in Dunedin) is a retired hockey player from New Zealand, who was a regular member of the men's national team, nicknamed The Black Sticks, during the late 1990s and early 2000s. Gill earned a total number of 79 caps during his career scoring 7 goals.
