= Florian Kunz =

German field hockey player

Personal information
- Born: 22 February 1972 (age 54) Leverkusen, West Germany
- Height: 200 cm (6 ft 7 in)
- Weight: 99 kg (218 lb)

Sport
- Sport: Field hockey
- Position: Defender
Senior career
Years	Team	Caps	Goals
–	Gladbach	-	-
National team
Years	Team	Caps	Goals
1992–2004	Germany	228	-
Medal record
Representing Germany
Men's field hockey
Olympic Games
Bronze medal – third place	2004 Athens	Team
World Cup
Gold medal – first place	2002 Kuala Lumpur	Team
Champions Trophy
Gold medal – first place	1995 Berlin	Team
Gold medal – first place	2001 Rotterdam	Team
Silver medal – second place	1994 Lahore	Team
Silver medal – second place	2000 Amstelveen	Team
Silver medal – second place	2002 Cologne	Team
Men's indoor field hockey
Indoor World Cup
Gold medal – first place	2003 Leipzig	Team

Florian Kunz (born 22 February 1972, in Leverkusen) is a former field hockey defender from Germany. He was the captain of the side which won the 2002 Men's Hockey World Cup. He played a total of 228 caps for the national team from 1992 until 2004. Kunz competed for Germany at the 2000 Summer Olympics and 2004 Summer Olympics.

Awards
Preceded by (Netherlands) Stephan Veen	FIH Player of the Year; 2001	Succeeded by (Germany) Michael Green
