= Ryan Archibald =

New Zealand field hockey player

Ryan Archibald MNZM
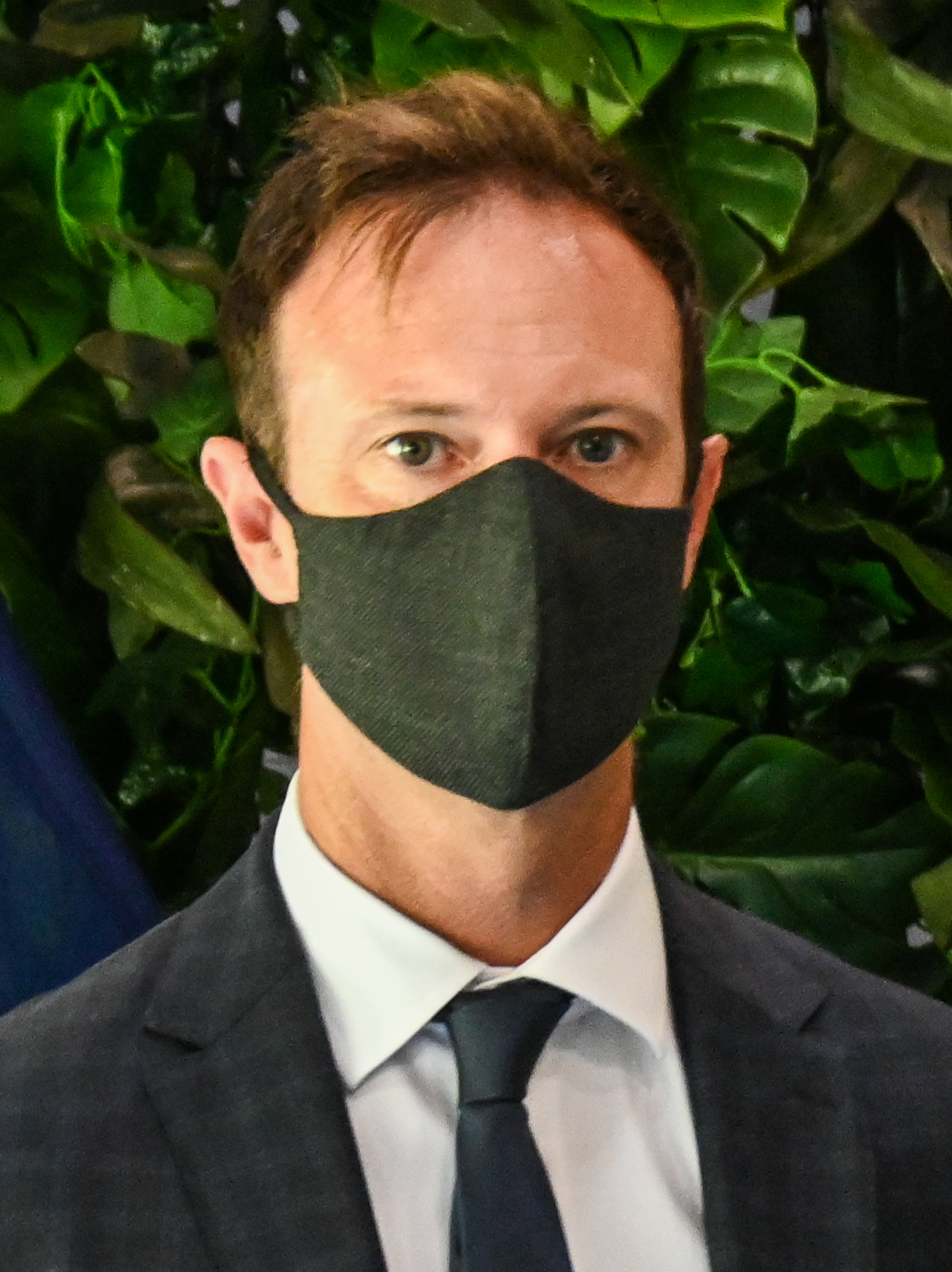
- Archibald in 2022

Personal information
- Full name: Ryan Jeffrey Archibald
- Born: 1 September 1980 (age 45) Auckland, New Zealand
- Relative: Jeff Archibald (father)
Medal record
Men's field hockey
Representing New Zealand
Commonwealth Games
| Silver medal – second place | 2002 Manchester | Team |
Champions Challenge
| Silver medal – second place | 2007 Boom | Team |

Ryan Jeffrey Archibald MNZM (born 1 September 1980) is a field hockey player from New Zealand, who earned his first cap for the national team, nicknamed The Black Sticks, in 1997 against Malaysia. Currently he is a player for Somerville Hockey Club.

In the 2021 Queen's Birthday Honours, Archibald was appointed a Member of the New Zealand Order of Merit, for services to hockey.

== International senior tournaments ==
- 1998 – Sultan Azlan Shah Cup
- 1998 – Commonwealth Games
- 1999 – Sultan Azlan Shah Cup
- 2000 – Olympic Qualifier
- 2000 – Sultan Azlan Shah Cup
- 2001 – World Cup Qualifier
- 2002 – World Cup
- 2002 – Commonwealth Games
- 2003 – Sultan Azlan Shah Cup
- 2003 – Champions Challenge
- 2004 – Olympic Qualifier
- 2004 – Champions Trophy
- 2005 – Sultan Azlan Shah Cup
- 2006 – Commonwealth Games
- 2006 – Hockey World Cup
- 2007 – Champions Challenge
- 2008 – Olympic Games
- 2012 – Olympic Games
