= Peter Proksch =

Austrian artist (1935–2012)

Peter Proksch (4 February 1935 – 9 December 2012) was an Austrian artist.

Born in Vienna, he was the oldest of four children. His father Alfred Proksch was an Olympic athlete and commercial artist, his mother was a model. When his father served during World War II, the family left Vienna to live in the countryside.

Proksch returned to Vienna in 1945 and attended secondary school. From 1950 to 1955 he studied graphic design at the Graphische Lehr- und Versuchsanstalt, Vienna, where he graduated with a masters diploma. He continued studying painting, at the Academy of Fine Arts Vienna, including with painter Sergius Pauser, completing his studies in 1962. His first personal exhibition was in 1963.

Proksch's work was often inspired by classical mythology, with some based on conventional Christian themes. Proksch was part of the group of artists known as the Vienna School of Fantastic Realism. His work was exhibited in Europe and globally.

== Exhibitions ==
- 1962 Silver Rose Gallery, Vienna
- 1963 VII Biennial, São Paulo
- 1964 Künstlerhaus, Vienna
- 1969 Touring Exhibition, Vienna School of Fantastic Realism (San Francisco, Austin, Fort Worth, Hollywood, Louisville, Madison, Nashville, Indianapolis, Tampa, Washington, New York, Philadelphia, Boston, Detroit, Chicago)
- 1970 Braith-Mali-Museum, Biberach, Germany
- 1971 Museum of Applied Arts, Vienna
- 1976 David Findlay Galleries, New York
- 1980 Künstlerhaus, Vienna
- 1981 National Gallery, Klagenfurt
- 1982 Secession, Vienna
- 1983 Upper House Museum, Passau
- 1984 Art Cologne, Cologne
- 1985 Wilhelm Hack Museum, Ludwigshafen
- 1988 Metropolitan Museum Simeonstift, Trier
- 1988 Künstlerhaus Nuremberg, Nuremberg
- 1989 Art Cologne, Cologne
- 1995 Sotheby Palace, Vienna
- 1995 Cathedral Gallery, Wiener Neustadt
- 1996 Gallery Corso, Vienna
- 2003 Gloria Gallery, Vienna
- 2003 Egon-Schiele-Museum Tulln
- 2007 Museum of Fantastic Art, Brussels
- 2009 Foundation Schlotter, Altea
