= Philip Webster =

British journalist

- Born: 1949 or 1950 (age 75–76)
- Education: Wymondham College; Harlow College
- Occupation: Journalist
- Employer(s): Eastern Daily Press; The Times

Philip Webster (born 1949 or 1950) is a British journalist. He spent 18 years as political editor of The Times and has had many other roles at the newspaper.

== Early and personal life ==
Webster was the son of a farmer in Norfolk. He was educated at Wymondham College. He entered a National Council for the Training of Journalists course run by Harlow College in 1968.

Webster is a supporter of Norwich City Football Club.

== Career ==
Webster began his career at the Eastern Daily Press in Norwich. After three years he joined The Times, of which he recalled:

I was helped when a senior staffer at The Times noticed that I could write shorthand pretty fast and hired me, virtually on the spot, to report in Parliament.

Webster was initially a press gallery reporter from February 1973. He wrote a book about Kevin Keelan, the goalkeeper for Norwich City F.C. He went on to join the Lobby as a political reporter in 1981. He became chief political correspondent of The Times in 1986. He wrote the newspaper's last splash from its headquarters in Gray's Inn Road (Leon Brittan, the secretary of state for trade and industry, under pressure to resign over the Westland affair) and its first splash from its headquarters in Wapping (Margaret Thatcher's fightback over the affair). Webster ran an "all-stars" football team.

Webster became political editor of The Times in 1992. He broke the story of John Major's affair with Edwina Currie. He stood down as political editor after the 2010 general election, having spent 18 years in the role. He was appointed Europe editor, and editor of thetimes.co.uk. In 2013 he was digital opinions editor and deputy head of news. He was later editor of The Times' Red Box political bulletin.

Webster retired on 13 January 2016 after a 43-year career at The Times, though it was reported that he would continue to write for the paper "on a casual basis". Webster's book about his time in journalism, Inside Story: Politics, Intrigue and Treachery from Thatcher to Brexit, was released later that year.

== Bibliography ==
- Keelan: The Story of a Goalkeeper (George Nobbs Publishing, 1979)
- Inside Story: Politics, Intrigue and Treachery from Thatcher to Brexit (Williams Collins, 2016) ISBN 978-0008201333

Media offices
Preceded by	Political Editor of The Times; 1992–2010	Succeeded by Roland Watson
