= Eugeniusz Gaczkowski =

Polish field hockey player (born 1965)

Eugeniusz Gaczkowski (born 3 January 1965 in Żnin) is a Polish former field hockey player who competed in the 2000 Summer Olympics.
