= Keevan Raj =

Malaysian field hockey player (born 1979)

Personal information
- Nationality: Malaysian
- Born: 14 October 1979 (age 46)

Sport
- Sport: Field hockey
Medal record
Men's field hockey
Representing Malaysia
Asian Games
Bronze medal – third place	2002 Busan	Team

Keevan Raj (born 14 October 1979) is a Malaysian former field hockey player. He competed in the men's tournament at the 2000 Summer Olympics.
