= Tom Bertram (field hockey) =

British field hockey player (born 1977)

Personal information
- Born: 24 May 1977 (age 49) Ashford, Surrey, England
- Height: 177 cm (5 ft 10 in)
- Weight: 83 kg (183 lb)

Sport
- Sport: Field hockey
Senior career
Years	Team	Caps	Goals
1995–1997	Stourport	-	-
1997–2002	Bournville	-	-
2002–2007	Reading	-	-
National team
Years	Team	Caps	Goals
–	GB & England		-
Medal record
Men's field hockey
Representing England
European Championship
Bronze medal – third place	1999 Padua	Team

Thomas Quesenbery Bertram (born 24 May 1977) is an English former field hockey player. Bertram played in two Summer Olympics for Great Britain in 2000 and 2004.

== Biography ==
Born 24 May 1977, in Ashford, Bertram was educated at Millfield School in Somerset and studied medicine at Birmingham University.

Nicknamed Bertie and/or Stroker, joined Stourport for the 1995/96 season and then joined Bournville in 1997.

While at Bournville and the University of Birmingham Hockey Club he made his English international debut in a friendly against Argentina in 1999 and at the 2000 Olympic Games in Sydney, he represented Great Britain in the field hockey tournament.

Bertram left Bournville for Reading and at the 2004 Olympic Games in Athens he represented Great Britain in the field hockey tournament again.

By profession Bertram is a doctor, and his international career was at times interrupted by his medical studies.
