= Hayden Shaw =

New Zealand field hockey player

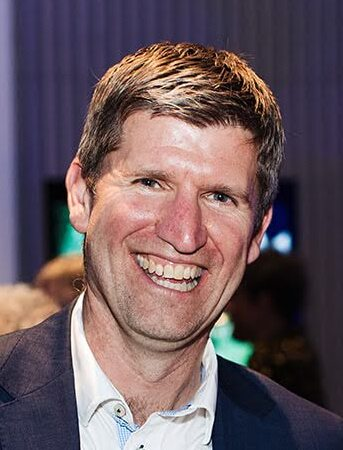
- Shaw in 2025

Personal information
- Full name: Hayden Jonathan Shaw
- Born: 31 August 1980 (age 45) Christchurch, New Zealand
Medal record
Men's field hockey
Representing New Zealand
Commonwealth Games
Silver medal – second place	2002 Manchester	Team
Bronze medal – third place	2010 Delhi	Team
Champions Challenge
Silver medal – second place	2007 Boom	Team

Hayden Jonathan Shaw (born 31 August 1980) is a field hockey player from New Zealand.

Shaw was born in Christchurch. He earned his first cap for the national team, nicknamed The Black Sticks, in 2002 against Australia. Shaw was often involved in penalty corner routines performing drag flicks. As a result, he was top scorer with 13 goals at the 2002 Commonwealth Games whilst winning a silver medal with the national team. After the 2006 Men's Hockey World Cup, Shaw was selected for the World Cup All Star team.

He has played club hockey for HC 's-Hertogenbosch in the Netherlands. Shaw also played first-class cricket for Canterbury. He now works as a teacher at Pleasant Point Primary School in South Canterbury, having started in January 2019.

== International senior tournaments ==
- 2002 – World Cup
- 2002 – Commonwealth Games
- 2003 – Sultan Azlan Shah Cup
- 2003 – Champions Challenge
- 2004 – Olympic Qualifying Tournament
- 2004 – Olympic Games
- 2006 – Commonwealth Games
- 2006 – World Cup
- 2007 – Champions Challenge
- 2008 – Olympic Games
- 2010 – Commonwealth Games
