= David Kosoof =

New Zealand field hockey player

Personal information
- Born: David William Koosof; 26 July 1978 (age 47) Rotorua, New Zealand

Sport
- Sport: Field hockey
Medal record
Men's field hockey
Representing New Zealand
Commonwealth Games
| Silver medal – second place | 2002 Manchester | Team competition |
Champions Challenge
| Silver medal – second place | 2007 Boom | Team competition |

David William Kosoof (born 26 July 1978) is a New Zealand field hockey player, who was a member of the New Zealand men's national field hockey team (the Black Sticks Men) between 2000 and 2009.He competed for New Zealand at the 2004 Summer Olympics in Athens, the 2008 Summer Olympics in Beijing. He was a Silver medalist at 2002 Commonwealth Games (Manchester)

Kosoof lives in Red Beach on the Hibiscus Coast north of Auckland, Kosoof has worked at North Harbour Hockey, TigerTurf NZ and now currently at OriginID
