= Umesh Parag =

New Zealand field hockey player

Personal information
- Full name: Umesh Vasan Parag
- Born: 15 August 1971 (age 54) Wellington, New Zealand
Medal record
Men's field hockey
Representing New Zealand
Commonwealth Games
Silver medal – second place	2002 Manchester	Team competition

Umesh Vasan Parag (born 15 August 1971) is a former field hockey player from New Zealand, who finished in eighth position with the Men's National Team, nicknamed Black Sticks, at the 1992 Summer Olympics in Barcelona, Spain. He won a silver medal with the team at the hockey tournament of the 2002 Commonwealth Games in Manchester. Parag plays locally for Wellington, and was also a member of the national squad competing at the 2004 Summer Olympics. He was born and raised in Wellington.
