= Tomasz Choczaj =

Polish field hockey player

Tomasz Choczaj (born 21 May 1976 in Poznań) is a Polish former field hockey player who competed in the 2000 Summer Olympics.
