= Björn Michel =

German field hockey player

Personal information
- Born: 7 February 1975 (age 51) Wiesbaden
- Height: 185 cm (6 ft 1 in)
- Weight: 82 kg (181 lb)

Sport
- Sport: Field hockey
Medal record
Men's field hockey
Representing Germany
Olympic Games
Bronze medal – third place	2004 Athens	Team

Björn Michel (born 7 February 1975 in Wiesbaden) is a German former field hockey player who competed in the 2000 Summer Olympics and in the 2004 Summer Olympics.
