= Rodrigo Vila =

Argentine field hockey player

Personal information
- Born: October 23, 1981 (age 44)
Medal record
Men's field hockey
Representing Argentina
Champions Challenge
Gold medal – first place	2007 Boom	Team
Pan American Games
Gold medal – first place	2011 Guadalajara	Team
Silver medal – second place	1999 Winnipeg	Team
Silver medal – second place	2007 Rio de Janeiro	Team

Rodrigo Nicolas Vila (born 23 October 1981 in Buenos Aires, Argentina) is a field hockey striker who made his debut for the national squad in 1998 and competed for his native country in the 2000 Summer Olympics, the 2004 Summer Olympics and 2012 Summer Olympics. His brothers Matías and Lucas are also a field hockey internationals for Argentina. Rodrigo has won three medals at the Pan American Games.
