= 1996 Men's Field Hockey Olympic Qualifier =

Qualification for the 1996 Summer Olympics

Tournament details
- Host country: Spain
- City: Barcelona
- Dates: 19–28 January
- Teams: 8

Final positions
- Champions: Netherlands
- Runner-up: India
- Third place: Great Britain

Tournament statistics
- Matches played: 28
- Goals scored: 116 (4.14 per match)
- Top scorer: (Netherlands) Taco van den Honert (12 goals)

The 1996 Men's Olympic Qualifier was a field hockey tournament held in Barcelona, Spain, from 19–28 January 1996. The tournament was held at the Real Club de Polo.

Eight nations competed at the tournament, with the top five earning qualification to the 1996 Summer Olympics in Atlanta.

== Squads ==
Belarus
- Igor Barkov
- Vitali Bondarenko
- Alexandre Boudnikov
- Guennadi Bribovski
- Youri Canja
- Serguey Drozdov
- Alexandre Eklemenko (gk)
- Dmitri Yukovski
- Stepan Klimovich
- Yuri Korottchenko
- Alexandre Mankovski
- Nikolay Sankovets
- Andrei Tchebotarev
- Albert Vintekevich (c)
- Igor Voltyuk
- Alexandre Yukovets

Head Coach
unknown

Belgium
- Fabian Berger
- Joeri Beunen
- Mick Beunen
- Alexandre de Chaffoy
- Marc Coudron (c)
- Jean-Michel Deville
- Gérald Dewamme
- Philippe van Hemelen
- Laurent Kelecom
- Michel Kinnen
- Michel van Oost (gk)
- Patrick Pille
- Thierry Renear
- Vincent Van Diest
- Bruno Vuylsteke
- Jean Willems

Head Coach
Alain Geens

Canada
- Alan Brahmst
- Patrick Burrows (c)
- Paul Chohan
- Robin D'Abreo
- John Desouza
- Rob Edamura
- Adam Evans
- Marek Gacek
- Chris Gifford
- Doug Harris
- Hari Kant (gk)
- Peter Milkovich
- Ken Pereira
- Rick Roberts
- André Rousseau (gk)
- Rob Short

Head Coach
Shiaz Virjee

Great Britain
- Guy Fordham
- Calum Giles
- Daniel Hall
- Julian Halls
- Simon Hazlitt
- Howard Hoskin
- Jason Laslett (c)
- David Luckes (gk)
- Simon Mason (gk)
- Chris Mayer
- John Shaw
- Soma Singh
- Kalbir Takher
- Nick Thompson
- Robert Thompson
- Jon Wyatt

Head Coach
unknown

India
- Anil Aldrin
- Edward Alloysins (gk)
- Bopaiah Anjapara (gk)
- Gavin Ferreira
- Sandeep Hamachimana
- Sanjeev Khumar
- Mukesh Kumar
- Dhanraj Pillay
- Mohamed Riaz Nabi
- Baljeet Singh Dhillon
- Baljeet Singh Saini
- Harpreet Singh
- Ramandeep Singh
- Pargat Singh (c)
- Dilip Tirkey
- Sabu Varkey

Head Coach
Cedric D'Souza

Malaysia
- Lim Chiow Chuan
- Charles David
- Calvin Fernandez
- Nadarajan Marathumuthu (gk)
- Maninderjt Singh
- Lailin Abu Hassan
- Brian Jayhan Siva
- Chairil Anwar Abdul Aziz
- Lum Mun Fatt
- Shankar Ramu
- Nor Saiful Nasiruddin (c)
- Mirnawan Nawawi
- Aphtar Singh
- Arul Selvaraj Sami
- Kuhan Shanmuganathan
- Yahia Vickneswaran

Head Coach
Volker Knapp

Netherlands
- Jacques Brinkman
- Maurits Crucq
- Marc Delissen (c)
- Jeroen Delmee
- Sander van Heeswijk
- Taco van den Honert
- Ronald Jansen (gk)
- Erik Jazet
- Leo Klein Gebbink
- Teun de Nooijer
- Wouter van Pelt
- Stephan Veen
- Guus Vogels (gk)
- Rogier van der Wal
- Remco van Wijk
- Rochus Westbroek

Head Coach
Roelant Oltmans

Spain
- Oriol Alcarez
- Jaime Amat
- Javier Arnau
- Jordi Arnau
- Óscar Barrena
- Juan Dinarés
- Juan Escarré
- Javier Escudé
- Juantxo García-Mauriño
- Antonio González (gk)
- Antonio Iglesias
- Ramón Jufresa (gk)
- Joaquim Malgosa (c)
- Victor Pujol
- Ramón Sala
- Pablo Usoz

Head Coach
Toni Forrellat

== Officials ==
- Xavier Adell (ESP)
- Patrick van Beneden (BEL)
- Santiago Deo (ESP)
- Henrik Ehlers (DEN)
- Floris Idenburg (NED)
- Sergey Platonov (RUS)
- Donald Prior (AUS)
- Peter von Reth (NED)
- Eduardo Ruiz (ARG)
- Vasutheven Sasidharan (MAS)
- Roger St Rose (TRI)
- Richard Wolter (GER)

== Results ==
=== Standings ===
Pos	Team	Pld	W	D	L	GF	GA	GD	Pts	Status
1st place, gold medalist(s)	Netherlands	7	5	1	1	27	13	+14	11	Qualified for 1996 Summer Olympics
2nd place, silver medalist(s)	India	7	4	3	0	15	7	+8	11	Qualified for 1996 Summer Olympics
3rd place, bronze medalist(s)	Great Britain	7	3	4	0	17	11	+6	10	Qualified for 1996 Summer Olympics
4	Spain	7	3	3	1	15	8	+7	9	Qualified for 1996 Summer Olympics
5	Malaysia	7	3	1	3	9	11	−2	7	Qualified for 1996 Summer Olympics
6	Canada	7	2	2	3	17	16	+1	6	
7	Belgium	7	1	0	6	12	25	−13	2	
8	Belarus	7	0	0	7	4	25	−21	0	

Source: Todor66
Rules for classification: 1) Points; 2) Goal difference; 3) Matches won; 4) Goals for; 5) Head-to-head result.

=== Fixtures ===
19 January 1996
09:30

Malaysia	2–1	Belgium
Mirnawan 18'; Saiful 47'	Report	J. Beunen 25'

Umpires:
Henrik Ehlers (DEN)
Peter von Reth (NED)

19 January 1996
11:30

Spain	3–1	Belarus
Iglesias 38'; Escarré 47'; Arnau 67'	Report	Korotchenko 13'

Umpires:
Eduardo Ruíz (ARG)
Vasutheven Sasidharan (MAS)

19 January 1996
13:30

Netherlands	5–1	Canada
Veen 4', 49'; Van Wijk 34', 48'; Delissen 61'	Report	Short 66'

Umpires:
Richard Wölter (GER)
Sergey Platonov (RUS)

19 January 1996
15:30

Great Britain	3–3	India
Giles 16', 35'; R. Thompson 30'	Report	Sanjeev 4'; Mukesh 54'; Pillay 57'

Umpires:
Patrick van Beneden (BEL)
Santiago Deo (ESP)

20 January 1996
15:30

Belgium	0–4	Spain
	Report	Arnau 1', 50', 55'; Escarré 67'

Umpires:
Roger St. Rose (TTO)
Floris Idenburg (NED)

20 January 1996
17:30

Malaysia	2–0	Belarus
Mirnawan 60'; Saiful 67'	Report

Umpires:
Xavier Adell (ESP)
Donald Prior (AUS)

21 January 1996
15:30

Netherlands	1–4	India
Van den Honert 34'	Report	Harpreet 24', 30'; Pillay 43', 57'

Umpires:
Eduardo Ruíz (ARG)
Henrik Ehlers (DEN)

21 January 1996
17:30

Canada	1–1	Great Britain
Gifford 63'	Report	R. Thompson 1'

Umpires:
Vasutheven Sasidharan (MAS)
Peter von Reth (NED)

22 January 1996
09:30

India	0–0	Spain
	Report

Umpires:
Richard Wölter (GER)
Donald Prior (AUS)

22 January 1996
11:30

Malaysia	1–4	Netherlands
Mirnawan 63'	Report	Van den Honert 7'; Veen 11', 25'; Brinkman 31'

Umpires:
Patrick van Beneden (BEL)
Sergey Platonov (RUS)

22 January 1996
13:30

Great Britain	4–1	Belarus
Wyatt 3'; Giles 6'; N. Thompson 15', 61'	Report	Bribovski 52'

Umpires:
Roger St. Rose (TTO)
Richard Wölter (GER)

22 January 1996
15:30

Canada	3–2	Belgium
Milkovich 7', 22'; Roberts 40'	Report	Coudron 26'; J. Beunen 55'

Umpires:
Xavier Adell (ESP)
Santiago Deo (ESP)

24 January 1996
09:30

Canada	1–2	Malaysia
D'Abreo 40'	Report	Mirnawan 27'; Saiful 43'

Umpires:
Richard Wölter (GER)
Eduardo Ruíz (ARG)

24 January 1996
11:30

Belarus	0–2	India
	Report	Pargat 47'; Pillay 63'

Umpires:
Xavier Adell (ESP)
Patrick van Beneden (BEL)

24 January 1996
13:30

Spain	2–2	Great Britain
Amat 43'; García-Mauriño 56'	Report	Giles 17'; R. Thompson 45'

Umpires:
Henrik Ehlers (DEN)
Peter von Reth (NED)

24 January 1996
15:30

Netherlands	9–4	Belgium
Crucq 4'; Veen 5', 59'; Van den Honert 17', 37', 50', 62', 65'; Delissen 48'	Report	Berger 9'; J. Beunen 23', 46'; M. Beunen 54'

Umpires:
Donald Prior (AUS)
Vasutheven Sasidharan (MAS)

25 January 1996
09:30

India	2–1	Canada
Ferreira 13'; Mukesh 37'	Report	Milkovich 69'

Umpires:
Henrik Ehlers (DEN)
Floris Idenburg (NED)

25 January 1996
11:30

Spain	2–0	Malaysia
Escudé 57'; Iglesias 61'	Report

Umpires:
Sergey Platonov (RUS)
Donald Prior (AUS)

25 January 1996
13:30

Great Britain	2–2	Netherlands
Mayer 36'; Giles 68'	Report	Van den Honert 23', 45'

Umpires:
Santiago Deo (ESP)
Roger St. Rose (TTO)

25 January 1996
15:30

Belgium	3–1	Belarus
J. Beunen 23', 69'; Dewamme 55'	Report	Yukovski 40'

Umpires:
Richard Wölter (GER)
Peter von Reth (NED)

27 January 1996
09:30

Great Britain	3–2	Malaysia
R. Thompson 3'; Giles 17'; N. Thompson 29'	Report	Saiful 14'; Mirnawan 62'

Umpires:
Xavier Adell (ESP)
Eduardo Ruíz (ARG)

27 January 1996
11:30

India	4–2	Belgium
Pargat 26', 59', 68'; Ramandeep 32'	Report	J. Beunen 7', 41'

Umpires:
Santiago Deo (ESP)
Sergey Platonov (RUS)

27 January 1996
13:30

Spain	3–3	Canada
Amat 11'; Iglesias 41'; Escudé 63'	Report	Gacek 6'; Chohan 15'; Milkovich 57'

Umpires:
Floris Idenburg (NED)
Patrick van Beneden (BEL)

27 January 1996
15:30

Belarus	0–4	Netherlands
	Report	Van den Honert 7', 60', 65'; Veen 45'

Umpires:
Roger St. Rose (TTO)
Vasutheven Sasidharan (MAS)

28 January 1996
09:00

Belgium	0–2	Great Britain
	Report	Giles 43', 58'

Umpires:
Roger St. Rose (TTO)
Peter von Reth (NED)

28 January 1996
11:00

India	0–0	Malaysia
	Report

Umpires:
Richard Wölter (GER)
Henrik Ehlers (DEN)

28 January 1996
13:00

Belarus	1–7	Canada
Boudnikov 8'	Report	Milkovich 7', 48', 60'; Short 27'; Brahmst 30'; Pereira 52'; Desouza 68'

Umpires:
Donald Prior (AUS)
Santiago Deo (ESP)

28 January 1996
15:00

Netherlands	2–1	Spain
Van der Wal 9'; Delissen 18'	Report	Arnau 58'

Umpires:
Eduardo Ruíz (ARG)
Patrick van Beneden (BEL)

== Final standings ==
- The top five teams qualified for the 1996 Summer Olympics in Atlanta.
1. Netherlands
2. India
3. Great Britain
4. Spain
5. Malaysia
6. Canada
7. Belgium
8. Belarus

== Goalscorers ==
There were 116 goals scored in 29 matches, for an average of 4 goals per match.

12 goals

- (Netherlands) Taco van den Honert

8 goals

- (Belgium) Joeri Beunen
- (United Kingdom) Calum Giles

7 goals

- (Canada) Peter Milkovich
- (Netherlands) Stephan Veen

5 goals

- (Malaysia) Mirnawan Nawawi
- (Spain) Javier Arnau

4 goals

- (United Kingdom) Robert Thompson
- (India) Dhanraj Pillay
- (India) Pargat Singh
- (Malaysia) Nor Saiful Nasiruddin

3 goals

- (United Kingdom) Nicholas Thompson
- (Netherlands) Marc Delissen
- (Spain) José Antonio Iglesias

2 goals

- (Canada) Robert Short
- (India) Mukesh Kumar
- (India) Harpreet Singh
- (Netherlands) Remco van Wijk
- (Spain) Jaime Amat
- (Spain) Juan Escarré
- (Spain) Javier Escudé

1 goal

- (Belarus) Alexandre Boudnikov
- (Belarus) Guennadi Bribovski
- (Belarus) Yuri Korotchenko
- (Belarus) Dmitri Yukovski
- (Belgium) Mick Beunen
- (Belgium) Fabian Berger
- (Belgium) Marc Coudron
- (Belgium) Gérald Dewamme
- (Canada) Alan Brahmst
- (Canada) Paul Chohan
- (Canada) Robin D'Abreo
- (Canada) John DeSouza
- (Canada) Marek Gacek
- (Canada) Christopher Gifford
- (Canada) Kenneth Pereira
- (Canada) Richard Roberts
- (United Kingdom) Christopher Mayer
- (United Kingdom) Jonathan Wyatt
- (India) Gavin Ferreira
- (India) Sanjeev Kumar
- (India) Ramandeep Singh
- (Netherlands) Jacques Brinkman
- (Netherlands) Maurits Crucq
- (Netherlands) Rogier van der Wal
- (Spain) Juantxo García-Mauriño

== See also ==
- 1995 Women's Field Hockey Olympic Qualifier
