= Malaysia at the 1996 Summer Olympics =

- IOC code: MAS
- NOC: Olympic Council of Malaysia
- Website: www.olympic.org.my (in English)

in Atlanta
- Competitors: 35 in 8 sports
- Flag bearer: Nor Saiful Zaini Nasiruddin
- Medals Ranked 58th: Gold 0 Silver 1 Bronze 1 Total 2

Summer Olympics appearances (overview)
- 1956; 1960; 1964; 1968; 1972; 1976; 1980; 1984; 1988; 1992; 1996; 2000; 2004; 2008; 2012; 2016; 2020; 2024; 2028

Other related appearances
- North Borneo (1956)

Malaysia competed at the 1996 Summer Olympics in Atlanta, United States.

== Medal summary ==
=== Medals by sport ===
Sport	Gold	Silver	Bronze	Total	Rank
Badminton	0	1	1	2	5
Total	0	1	1	2	58

=== Medallists ===
Medal	Name	Sport	Event	Date
Silver	Cheah Soon Kit; Yap Kim Hock	Badminton	Men's doubles	31 July
Bronze	Rashid Sidek	Badminton	Men's singles	31 July

== Athletics ==
Key

- Note–Ranks given for track events are within the athlete's heat only
- Q = Qualified for the next round
- q = Qualified for the next round as a fastest loser or, in field events, by position without achieving the qualifying target
- NR = National record
- N/A = Round not applicable for the event
- Bye = Athlete not required to compete in round

Men
Track event

Athlete	Event	Heat		Quarterfinal		Semifinal		Final	
Athlete	Event	Result	Rank	Result	Rank	Result	Rank	Result	Rank
Watson Nyambek	100 m	10.55	6	did not advance					

Field event

Athlete	Event	Qualification		Final	
Athlete	Event	Distance	Position	Distance	Position
Loo Kum Zee	High jump	2.15	30	did not advance	

Women
Road event

Athlete	Event	Heat		Quarterfinal		Semifinal		Final	
Athlete	Event	Result	Rank	Result	Rank	Result	Rank	Result	Rank
Annastasia Raj	10 km walk	—N/a						45:47	24

== Badminton ==
Athlete	Event	Round of 64	Round of 32	Round of 16	Quarterfinal	Semifinal	Final	Rank
Athlete	Event	Opposition Score	Opposition Score	Opposition Score	Opposition Score	Opposition Score	Opposition Score	Rank
Rashid Sidek	Men's singles	Bye	Andrey Antropov (RUS); W 15–11, 15–7	Yu Lizhi (CHN); W 15–5, 15–2	Joko Suprianto (INA); W 15–5, 15–12	Dong Jiong (CHN); L 6–15, 16–18	Bronze medal match Hariyanto Arbi (INA); W 5–15, 15–11, 15–6	3rd place, bronze medalist(s)
Ong Ewe Hock	Men's singles	Robert Liljequist (FIN); W 17–14, 12–15, 15–2	Jeroen van Dijk (NED); W 15–11, 15–10	Poul-Erik Høyer Larsen (DEN); L 14–17, 9–15	did not advance			
Cheah Soon Kit; Yap Kim Hock (2)	Men's doubles	—N/a	Bye	Ge Cheng; Tao Xiaoqiang (CHN); W 15–8, 15–2	Ha Tae-kwon; Kang Kyung-jin (KOR); W 18–17, 15–8	Antonius Ariantho; Denny Kantono (INA); W 15–10, 15–4	Gold medal match Rexy Mainaky; Ricky Subagja (INA); L 15–5, 13–15, 12–15	2nd place, silver medalist(s)
Soo Beng Kiang; Tan Kim Her	Men's doubles	—N/a	Anil Kaul; Iain Sydie (CAN); W 15–7, 15–3	Rudy Gunawan; Bambang Suprianto (INA); W 18–13, 4–15, 15–6	Simon Archer; Chris Hunt (GBR); W 15–5, 15–12	Rexy Mainaky; Ricky Subagja (INA); L 15–3, 15–5	Bronze medal match Antonius Ariantho; Denny Kantono (INA); L 4–15, 15–12, 15–8	4
Chan Chia Fong	Women's singles	Bye	Ye Zhaoying (CHN); L 4–11, 1–11	did not advance				

== Boxing ==
Men

Athlete	Event	Round of 32	Round of 16	Quarterfinals	Semifinals	Final	
Athlete	Event	Opposition Result	Opposition Result	Opposition Result	Opposition Result	Opposition Result	Rank
Sapok Biki	Light flyweight	Jesús Martínez (MEX); L 4–15	did not advance				

== Canoeing ==
=== Slalom ===
Athlete	Event	Run 1				Run 2				Total	Rank
Athlete	Event	Time	Points	Total	Rank	Time	Points	Total	Rank	Total	Rank
Sal Ayob	Men's K-1	189.15	70	259.15	42	174.54	55	229.54	41	229.54	43

== Field hockey ==
=== Men's tournament ===
Team roster

- Mohamed Nasihin Nubil Ibrahim
- Maninderjit Singh Magmar
- Lailin Abu Hassan
- Brian Jaya Siva
- Lim Chiow Chuan
- Charles David
- Chairil Anwar Abdul Aziz
- Lam Mun Fatt
- Shankar Ramu
- Nor Saiful Zaini Nasiruddin
- Kaliswaran Muniandy
- Aphthar Singh Piara
- Mirnawan Nawawi
- Calvin Fernandez
- Kuhan Shanmuganathan
- Hamdan Hamzah

Group B

Team	Pld	W	D	L	GF	GA	GD	Pts
Netherlands	5	4	1	0	14	6	+8	9
Australia	5	3	1	1	13	7	+6	7
Great Britain	5	1	3	1	8	8	0	5
South Korea	5	1	2	2	12	13	–1	4
South Africa	5	0	3	2	7	12	–5	3
Malaysia	5	0	2	3	7	15	–8	2

Qualified for semifinals

21 July 1996
09:00

Netherlands	2 – 0	Malaysia
Lomas 10'; Klein Gebbink 29'	Report

Umpires:
Ray O'Connor (IRL)
Eduardo Ruiz (ARG)

23 July 1996
17:30

Malaysia	2 – 2	South Africa
Nawawi 38', 61'	Report	Nicol 26'; G. Fulton 64'

Umpires:
Henrik Ehlers (DEN)
Kiyoshi Sana (JPN)

25 July 1996
17:30

Malaysia	2 – 2	Great Britain
Nasiruddin 4'; Abdul Aziz 69'	Report	Shaw 41'; Giles 63'

Umpires:
Ayman Amin (EGY)
Antonio Morales (ESP)

27 July 1996
09:00

Malaysia	1 – 5	Australia
Nasiruddin 44'	Report	Davies 3'; Choppy 4', 6', 10'; Lewis 37'

Umpires:
Richard Wolter (GER)
Patrick van Beneden (BEL)

29 July 1996
17:30

Malaysia	2 – 4	South Korea
Nasiruddin 60'; Nawawi 64'	Report	Kang Keon-Wook 16', 40'; Park Shin-Heum 39'; Kim Jong-Yi 49'

Umpires:
Steve Horgan (USA)
Eduardo Ruiz (ARG)

Ninth to twelfth place classification

31 July 1996
08:30

Argentina	4 – 4 (a.e.t.)	Malaysia
Retegui 14', 55'; Ferrara 57'; J. Lombi 69'	Report	A. Singh 26'; Siva 38'; Nawawi 39'; Shamuganathan 59'
Penalties
	3 – 0

Umpires:
Patrick van Beneden (BEL)
Kayoshi Sana (JPN)

Eleventh to twelfth place match

1 August 1996
08:30

Malaysia	4 – 1	United States
Lim Chiow Chuan 34', 44'; Nawawi 38'; Shanmuganathan 56'	Report	Butcher 68'

Umpires:
Henrik Ehlers (DEN)
Antonio Morales (ESP)

Ranked 11th in final standings

== Sailing ==
Open

Athlete	Event	Race											Net points	Final rank
Athlete	Event	1	2	3	4	5	6	7	8	9	10	11	Net points	Final rank
Kevin Lim	Laser	32	26	36	34	35	39	~~48~~	33	40	~~41~~	25	300	37

== Shooting ==
Men

Athlete	Event	Qualification		Final	
Athlete	Event	Points	Rank	Points	Rank
Kaw Fun Ying	Skeet	110	54	did not advance	

== Swimming ==
Men

Athlete	Events	Round 1		Final B		Final A	
Athlete	Events	Time	Rank	Time	Rank	Time	Rank
Alex Lim	100 m backstroke	57.68	32	did not advance			
Alex Lim	200 m backstroke	2:06.17	31	did not advance			
Elvin Chia	100 m breaststroke	1:04.46	29	did not advance			
Elvin Chia	200 m breaststroke	2:20.39	25	did not advance			
Anthony Ang	100 m butterfly	56.41	45	did not advance			
Anthony Ang	200 m butterfly	2:03.01	31	did not advance			
Wan Azlan Abdullah	100 m individual medley	2:12.11	36	did not advance			
Wan Azlan Abdullah	400 m individual medley	4:38.95	27	did not advance			
Alex Lim; Anthony Ang; Elvin Chia; Wan Azlan Abdullah	4 × 100 m medley relay	3:52.58	20	—N/a		did not advance	

Women

Athlete	Events	Round 1		Final B		Final A	
Athlete	Events	Time	Rank	Time	Rank	Time	Rank
Tay Li Leng	100 m breaststroke	1:14.17	36	did not advance			
