= Hockey at the 1998 Commonwealth Games =

Field hockey at the 1998 Commonwealth Games
- Venue: Bukit Jalil National Stadium
- Dates: 9 – 20 September 1998
- Nations: 11 (men); 12 (women)

Hockey at the 1998 Commonwealth Games was the inaugural appearance of Hockey at the Commonwealth Games. There were two competitions: the men's tournament and the women's tournament.

== Men's tournament ==
=== Medalists ===
Event	Gold	Silver	Bronze
Men	Australia; Australia; Michael Brennan; Adam Commens; Stephen Davies; Damon Diletti; Jason Duff; James Elmer; Paul Gaudoin; Mark Hickman; Jeremy Hiskins; Stephen Holt; Brent Livermore; Matthew Smith; Daniel Sproule; Jay Stacy; Lachlan Vivian-Taylor; Michael York	Malaysia; Malaysia; Nor Azlan Bakar; Nor Saiful Zaini; Mirnawan Nawawi; Roslan Jamaluddin; Calvin Fernandez; Gobinathan Krishnamurthy; Maninderjit Singh; Chairil Anwar Abdul Aziz; K. Keevan Raj; Kuhan Shanmuganathan; Mohd Madzli Ikmar; R. Shanker; M. Kaliswaran; K. Logan Raj; Mohamad Syayrin Uda Karim; Suhaimi Ibrahim	England; England; Bobby Crutchley; Guy Fordham; Julian Halls; Stuart Head; Russell Garcia; Brett Garrard; Michael Johnson; David Luckes; Simon Mason; Mark Pearn; Justin Pidcock; Ben Sharpe; Jimmy Wallis; Bill Waugh; Duncan Woods; Jon Wyatt

== Women's tournament ==
=== Medalists ===
Event	Gold	Silver	Bronze
Women	Australia; Australia; Alison Peek; Alyson Annan; Bianca Langham; Claire Mitchell-Taverner; Juliet Haslam; Justine Sowry; Kate Starre; Katie Allen; Katrina Powell; Kristen Towers; Lisa Powell; Louise Dobson; Michelle Andrews; Nikki Mott; Rachel Imison; Rechelle Hawkes	England; England; Carolyn Reid; Denise Marston-Smith; Fiona Greenham; Hilary Rose; Jackie Empson; Jane Sixsmith; Jane Smith; Jennie Bimson; Karen Brown; Kerry Moore; Kirsty Bowden; Lucilla Wright; Lucy Newcombe; Mandy Nicholson; Melanie Clewlow; Tina Cullen	New Zealand; New Zealand; Anna Lawrence; Diana Weavers; Emily Gillam; Helen Clarke; Jenny Duck; Jenny Shepherd; Karen Smith; Kate Trolove; Lisa Walton; Mandy Smith; Moira Senior; Robyn Toomey; Skippy Hamahona; Sandy Bennett; Suzie Pearce; Tina Bell-Kake
