= 1994 Men's Hockey World Cup =

1994 Hockey World Cup
- Official logo

Tournament details
- Host country: Australia
- City: Sydney
- Dates: 23 November – 4 December 1994
- Teams: 12 (from 5 confederations)
- Venue: Homebush Stadium

Final positions
- Champions: Pakistan (4th title)
- Runner-up: Netherlands
- Third place: Australia

Tournament statistics
- Matches played: 42
- Goals scored: 143 (3.4 per match)
- Top scorer: (Netherlands) Taco van den Honert (10 goals)
- Best player: (Pakistan) Shahbaz Ahmed

The 1994 Men's Hockey World Cup was the eighth edition of the Hockey World Cup, the quadrennial world championship for men's national field hockey teams organized by the FIH. It was held from 23 November to 4 December 1994 in Sydney, Australia. Pakistan defeated the Netherlands 4–3 on penalties (full time 1-1) to lift the trophy.

== Qualification ==
Dates	Event	Location	Quotas	Qualifier(s)
Host			1	Australia
12–23 February 1990	1990 World Cup	Lahore, Pakistan	5	Netherlands; Pakistan; Germany (Note: Qualified as West Germany); England; Belarus (Note: Qualified as the Soviet Union)
19–28 August 1993	1993 World Cup Qualifier	Poznań, Poland	6	South Korea; Spain; India; Argentina; South Africa; Belgium
Total			12	

== Umpires ==
Below is the list of umpires appointed by International Hockey Federation (FIH):

- Shafat Baghdadi (PAK)
- Gary Belder (AUS)
- Tarlok Bhullar (IND)
- Adriano De Vecchi (ITA)
- Santiago Deo (ESP)
- Steve Horgan (USA)
- Rob Lathouwers (NED)
- Don Prior (AUS)
- Kiyoshi Sana (JPN)
- Roger St. Rose (TTO)
- Christopher Todd (ENG)
- Patrick van Beneden (BEL)
- Alan Waterman (CAN)
- Richard Wolter (GER)

== Results ==
=== Pool A ===
Pos	Team	Pld	W	D	L	GF	GA	GD	Pts	Qualification
1	Pakistan	5	4	0	1	10	4	+6	8	Semi-finals
2	Australia (H)	5	4	0	1	9	4	+5	8	Semi-finals
3	England	5	2	2	1	4	3	+1	6	
4	Argentina	5	2	1	2	8	8	0	5	
5	Spain	5	1	1	3	7	8	−1	3	
6	Belarus	5	0	0	5	2	13	−11	0	

Source: FIH
(H) Hosts

23 November 1994
11:00

Australia	2–0	Belarus
Elmer 8'; Hager 32'	Report

Umpires:
Tarlok Bhullar (IND)
Patrick van Beneden (BEL)

23 November 1994
13:00

England	0–0	Spain
	Report

Umpires:
Rob Lathouwers (NED)
Richard Wolter (GER)

23 November 1994
15:00

Pakistan	3–0	Argentina
Ashraf 30'; Zaman 60'; Feroz 64'	Report

Umpires:
Roger St. Rose (TTO)
Adriano De Vecchi (ITA)

24 November 1994
15:00

Belarus	0–1	England
	Report	Thompson 64'

Umpires:
Steve Horgan (USA)
Kiyoshi Sana (JPN)

24 November 1994
17:00

Argentina	1–2	Australia
Ferrara 26'	Report	Lewis 9'; Stacy 16'

Umpires:
Rob Lathouwers (NED)
Alan Waterman (CAN)

25 November 1994
11:00

Pakistan	3–1	Spain
Ashraf 26', 51'; Feroz 62'	Report	García-Mauriño 41'

Umpires:
Patrick van Beneden (BEL)
Richard Wolter (GER)

26 November 1994
11:30

England	1–1	Argentina
Laslett 44'	Report	Moresi 17'

Umpires:
Tarlok Bhullar (IND)
Richard Wolter (GER)

26 November 1994
13:30

Spain	4–1	Belarus
Arnau 26', 54', 59'; Pujol 46'	Report	Sankovets 34'

Umpires:
Roger St. Rose (TTO)
Alan Waterman (CAN)

26 November 1994
15:30

Australia	1–2	Pakistan
Birmingham 49'	Report	Zaman 23'; Ashraf 40'

Umpires:
Rob Lathouwers (NED)
Adriano De Vecchi (ITA)

28 November 1994
11:00

Australia	2–1	Spain
Hager 2'; Lewis 44'	Report	Escudé 9'

Umpires:
Tarlok Bhullar (IND)
Patrick van Beneden (BEL)

28 November 1994
13:00

Pakistan	0–2	England
	Report	Thompson 28', 49'

Umpires:
Kiyoshi Sana (JPN)
Richard Wolter (GER)

28 November 1994
15:00

Belarus	1–4	Argentina
Holopov 59'	Report	Lombi 10', 25', 65'; Querejeta 70'

Umpires:
Rob Lathouwers (NED)
Roger St. Rose (TTO)

29 November 1994
16:30

Spain	1–2	Argentina
Dinarés 40'	Report	Ferrara 23', 70'

Umpires:
Adriano De Vecchi (ITA)
Kiyoshi Sana (JPN)

29 November 1994
18:30

Australia	2–0	England
Davies 23'; Lewis 24'	Report

Umpires:
Patrick van Beneden (BEL)
Richard Wolter (GER)

30 November 1994
12:30

Pakistan	2–0	Belarus
Ashraf 16', 64'	Report

Umpires:
Rob Lathouwers (NED)
Patrick van Beneden (BEL)

=== Pool B ===
Pos	Team	Pld	W	D	L	GF	GA	GD	Pts	Qualification
1	Netherlands	5	4	1	0	21	6	+15	9	Semi-finals
2	Germany	5	2	3	0	10	3	+7	7	Semi-finals
3	India	5	2	1	2	11	10	+1	5	
4	South Korea	5	1	2	2	10	9	+1	4	
5	South Africa	5	0	4	1	5	9	−4	4	
6	Belgium	5	0	1	4	6	26	−20	1	

Source: FIH

23 November 1994
17:00

Germany	1–1	South Africa
Blunck 7'	Report	Boddington 70'

Umpires:
Santiago Deo (ESP)
Christopher Todd (ENG)

24 November 1994
11:00

Belgium	1–8	Netherlands
De Chaffoy 28'	Report	Veen 15', 60'; Van den Honert 35', 39', 42', 53', 65'; Delissen 36'

Umpires:
Shafat Baghdadi (PAK)
Christopher Todd (ENG)

24 November 1994
13:00

South Korea	0–2	India
	Report	Ferreira 61'; Aranah 62'

Umpires:
Don Prior (AUS)
Adriano De Vecchi (ITA)

25 November 1994
13:00

Belgium	0–6	Germany
	Report	Meinhardt 2', 8', 48', 52'; Bellenbaum 20'; Michler 32'

Umpires:
Shafat Baghdadi (PAK)
Don Prior (AUS)

25 November 1994
15:00

South Korea	0–0	South Africa
	Report

Umpires:
Steve Horgan (USA)
Roger St. Rose (TTO)

25 November 1994
17:00

Netherlands	4–2	India
Van den Honert 28', 68'; Klein 43'; De Nooijer 54'	Report	Ferreira 34'; Ahmed 63'

Umpires:
Santiago Deo (ESP)
Kiyoshi Sana (JPN)

27 November 1994
11:30

South Korea	7–2	Belgium
Shin Seok-kyo 2', 65'; Kim Young-kyu 9'; Kang Keon-wook 40', 70'; Jeong Yong-kyun 61'; Choi Jung-ho 67'	Report	E. Vandergracht 48', 61'

Umpires:
Steve Horgan (USA)
Kiyoshi Sana (JPN)

27 November 1994
13:30

India	2–2	South Africa
Aldrin 3', 66'	Report	Clark 12'; Anderson 19'

Umpires:
Christopher Todd (ENG)
Alan Waterman (CAN)

27 November 1994
15:30

Germany	0–0	Netherlands
	Report

Umpires:
Santiago Deo (ESP)
Don Prior (AUS)

28 November 1994
17:00

South Africa	1–1	Belgium
Fredericks 30'	Report	Coudron 56'

Umpires:
Don Prior (AUS)
Shafat Baghdadi (PAK)

29 November 1994
12:30

Germany	2–1	India
Becker 20'; Tewes 53'	Report	Aranah 30'

Umpires:
Santiago Deo (ESP)
Christopher Todd (ENG)

29 November 1994
14:30

Netherlands	4–2	South Korea
Bovelander 12', 27', 52'; Delissen 14'	Report	Shin Seok-kyo 20'; Kim Young-kyu 59'

Umpires:
Don Prior (AUS)
Alan Waterman (CAN)

30 November 1994
14:30

India	4–2	Belgium
M. Kumar 6', 13'; Riaz 18', 61'	Report	Coudron 2', 67'

Umpires:
Santiago Deo (ESP)
Steve Horgan (USA)

30 November 1994
16:30

Netherlands	5–1	South Africa
Van den Honert 16', 19', 61'; Veen 33'; Brinkman 55'	Report	Boddington 37'

Umpires:
Adriano De Vecchi (ITA)
Christopher Todd (ENG)

30 November 1994
18:30

Germany	1–1	South Korea
Bechmann 60'	Report	Kim Young-kyu 25'

Umpires:
Shafat Baghdadi (PAK)
Roger St. Rose (TTO)

=== Ninth to twelfth place classification ===
Crossover
3 December 1994
Spain (p.s.o)	1 (8)
Belgium	1 (7)
3 December 1994
Belarus	2
South Africa	3

Ninth place
4 December 1994
Spain	2
South Africa	0
Eleventh place
4 December 1994
Belgium	1
Belarus	0

==== Crossover ====
3 December 1994
08:45

Spain	1–1	Belgium
Arnau 25'	Report	Coudron 63'
Penalties
	8–7

Umpires:
Tarlok Bhullar (IND)
Alan Waterman (CAN)

3 December 1994
11:10

Belarus	2–3	South Africa
Barkov 1'; Kachkar 58'	Report	Boddington 3'; Teversham 37'; Anderson 70'

Umpires:
Shafat Baghdadi (PAK)
Roger St. Rose (TTO)

==== Eleventh and twelfth place ====
4 December 1994
08:45

Belgium	1–0	Belarus
Vandergracht 50'	Report

Umpires:
Shafat Baghdadi (PAK)
Alan Waterman (CAN)

==== Ninth and tenth place ====
4 December 1994
11:00

Spain	2–0	South Africa
Arnau 27'; Freixa 69'	Report

Umpires:
Steve Horgan (USA)
Tarlok Bhullar (IND)

=== Fifth to eighth place classification ===
Crossover
2 December 1994
England	3
South Korea	1
2 December 1994
Argentina	2 (1)
India (p.s.o)	2 (4)

Fifth place
3 December 1994
England	0
India	1
Seventh place
3 December 1994
South Korea	3 (3)
Argentina (p.s.o)	3 (5)

==== Crossover ====
2 December 1994
10:30

England	3–1	South Korea
Crutchley 13', 20'; Garcia 63'	Report	You Myung-keun 41'

Umpires:
Tarlok Bhullar (IND)
Kiyoshi Sana (JPN)

2 December 1994
12:45

Argentina	2–2	India
Ferrara 44'; Retegui 66'	Report	Pillay 22'; Sebastian 35'
Penalties
	1–4

Umpires:
Rob Lathouwers (NED)
Roger St. Rose (TTO)

==== Seventh and eighth place ====
3 December 1994
13:15

South Korea	3–3	Argentina
Kim Young-kyu 11'; Park Shin-heum 25'; Shin Seok-kyo 67'	Report	Keenan 49'; Ferrara 52', 69'
Penalties
	3–5

Umpires:
Adrian De Vecchi (ITA)
Steve Horgan (USA)

==== Fifth and sixth place ====
3 December 1994
15:30

England	0–1	India
	Report	M. Kumar 45'

Umpires:
Rob Lathouwers (NED)
Kiyoshi Sana (JPN)

=== First to fourth place classification ===
Semi-finals
2 December 1994
Australia	1
Netherlands	3
2 December 1994
Pakistan (p.s.o)	1 (5)
Germany	1 (3)

Final
4 December 1994
Netherlands	1 (3)
Pakistan (p.s.o)	1 (4)
Third place
4 December 1994
Australia	5
Germany	2

==== Semi-finals ====
2 December 1994
15:00

Australia	1–3	Netherlands
Gaudoin 47'	Report	Bovelander 5', 20'; Brinkman 67'

Umpires:
Richard Wolter (GER)
Patrick van Beneden (BEL)

2 December 1994
17:30

Pakistan	1–1	Germany
Ashraf 18'	Report	Meinhardt 22'
Penalties
	5–3

Umpires:
Don Prior (AUS)
Santiago Deo (ESP)

==== Third and fourth place ====
4 December 1994
13:15

Australia	5–2	Germany
Davies 15'; Wansbrough 19'; Lewis 22'; Bodimeade 24'; Stacy 37'	Report	Meinhardt 56', 58'

Umpires:
Rob Lathouwers (NED)
Kiyoshi Sana (JPN)

==== Final ====
4 December 1994
15:30

Netherlands	1–1	Pakistan
Bovelander 17'	Report	Ashraf 21'
Penalties
Van den Honert (penalty shoot-out scored); Bovelander (penalty shoot-out missed); Delissen (penalty shoot-out scored); Brinkman (penalty shoot-out scored); Delmee (penalty shoot-out missed)	3–4	(penalty shoot-out scored) Ahmed; (penalty shoot-out scored) Shehbaz; (penalty shoot-out scored) Zaman; (penalty shoot-out scored) Usman; (penalty shoot-out missed) Shafqat

Umpires:
Santiago Deo (ESP)
Don Prior (AUS)

== Statistics ==
=== Final standings ===
1. Pakistan
2. Netherlands
3. Australia
4. Germany
5. India
6. England
7. Argentina
8. South Korea
9. Spain
10. South Africa
11. Belgium
12. Belarus

=== Goalscorers ===
There were 143 goals scored in 42 matches, for an average of 3.4 goals per match.

10 goals

- (Netherlands) Taco van den Honert

8 goals

- (Pakistan) Kamran Ashraf

7 goals

- (Germany) Sven Meinhardt

6 goals

- (Argentina) Fernando Ferrara
- (Netherlands) Floris Bovelander

5 goals

- (Spain) Javier Arnau

4 goals

- (Australia) Paul Lewis
- (Belgium) Marc Coudron
- (South Korea) Kim Young-kyu
- (South Korea) Shin Seok-kyo

3 goals

- (Argentina) Jorge Lombi
- (Belgium) Erik Vandergracht
- (England) Nicky Thompson
- (India) Mukesh Kumar
- (Netherlands) Stephan Veen
- (South Africa) Gary Boddington

2 goals

- (Australia) Stephen Davies
- (Australia) Mark Hager
- (Australia) Jay Stacy
- (England) Bobby Crutchley
- (India) Anil Aldrin
- (India) Edward Aranah
- (India) Gavin Ferreira
- (India) Mohammed Riaz
- (Netherlands) Jacques Brinkman
- (Netherlands) Marc Delissen
- (Pakistan) Tahir Zaman
- (Pakistan) Feroze Wasim
- (South Africa) Murray Anderson
- (South Korea) Kang Keon-wook

1 goal

- (Argentina) Patricio Keenan
- (Argentina) Fernando Moresi
- (Argentina) Jorge Querejeta
- (Argentina) Carlos Retegui
- (Australia) Warren Birmingham
- (Australia) Lee Bodimeade
- (Australia) Lachlan Elmer
- (Australia) Paul Gaudoin
- (Australia) David Wansbrough
- (Belarus) Igor Barkov
- (Belarus) Vitali Holopov
- (Belarus) Vladimir Kachkar
- (Belarus) Nikolai Sankovets
- (Belgium) Alexandre de Chaffoy
- (England) Russell Garcia
- (England) Jason Laslett
- (Germany) Christoph Bechmann
- (Germany) Andreas Becker
- (Germany) Patrick Bellenbaum
- (Germany) Christian Blunck
- (Germany) Klaus Michler
- (Germany) Jan-Peter Tewes
- (India) Shakeel Ahmed
- (India) Jude Felix
- (India) Dhanraj Pillay
- (Netherlands) Teun de Nooijer
- (Netherlands) Leo Klein
- (South Africa) Gregg Clark
- (South Africa) Allistar Fredericks
- (South Africa) Charles Teversham
- (South Korea) Choi Jung-ho
- (South Korea) Jeon Jong-ha
- (South Korea) Jeong Yong-gyun
- (South Korea) Park Sin-heung
- (Spain) Juan Dinarés
- (Spain) Javier Escudé
- (Spain) David Freixa
- (Spain) Juantxo García-Mauriño
- (Spain) Víctor Pujol

Source: FIH

== See also ==
- 1994 Women's Hockey World Cup
