= Field hockey at the 1996 Summer Olympics – Men's tournament =

Men's field hockey at the 1996 Summer Olympics
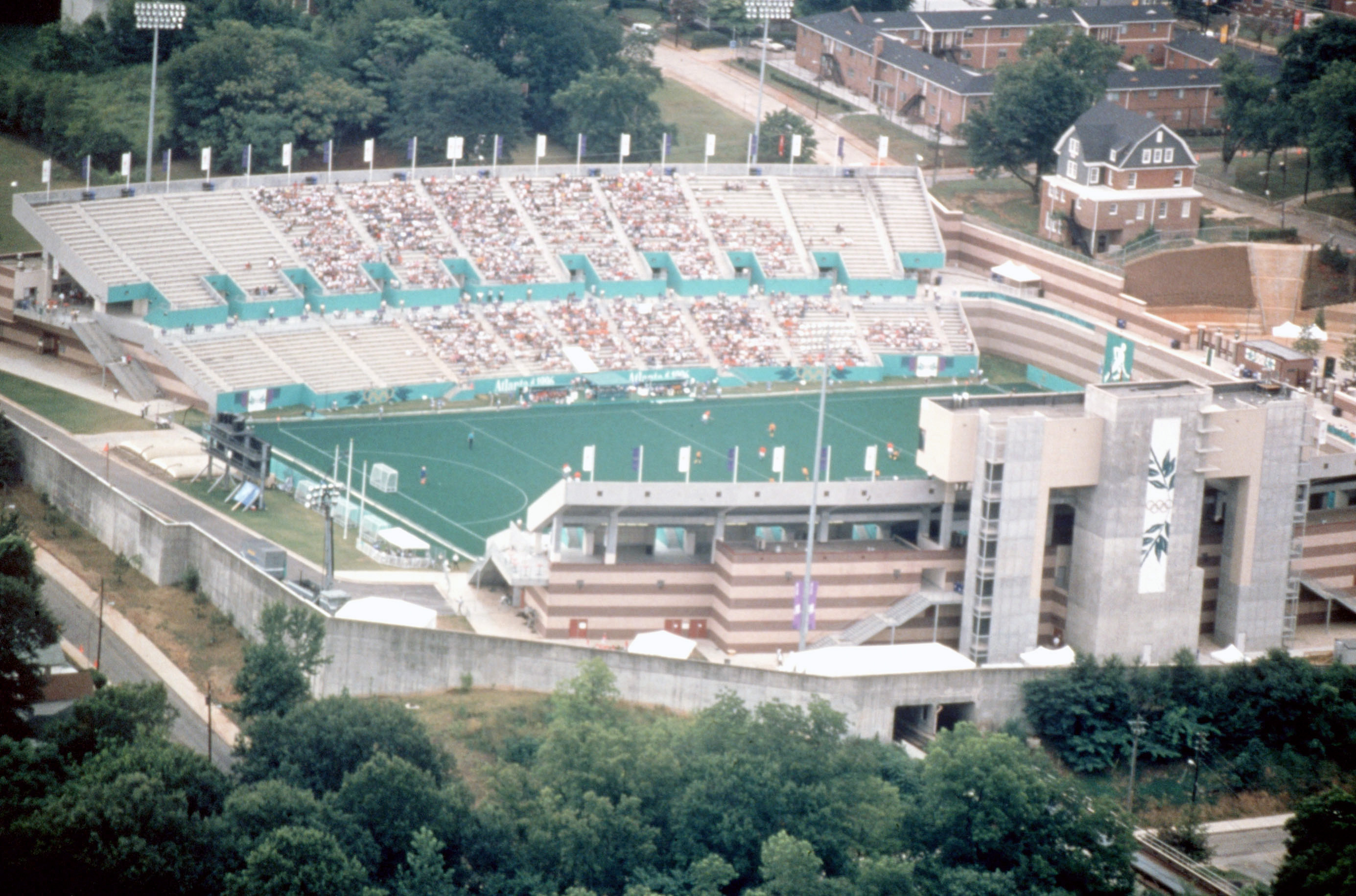

Tournament details
- Host country: United States
- City: Atlanta
- Dates: 20 July – 2 August
- Teams: 12
- Venue(s): Herndon Stadium; Panther Stadium

Final positions
- Champions: Netherlands (1st title)
- Runner-up: Spain
- Third place: Australia

Tournament statistics
- Matches played: 42
- Goals scored: 173 (4.12 per match)
- Top scorer(s): (Netherlands) Taco van den Honert (South Africa) Greg Nicol (7 goals)

The men's field hockey tournament at the 1996 Summer Olympics was the 18th edition of the field hockey event for men at the Summer Olympic Games. It was held over a fourteen-day period beginning on 20 July, and culminating with the medal finals on 2 August. Games were played at the Herndon Stadium and the Panther Stadium, both located in Atlanta, United States.

The Netherlands won the gold medal for the first time after defeating Spain 3–1 in the final. Australia won the bronze medal by defeating Germany 3–2.

== Qualification ==
Each of the continental champions from five federations, the previous Olympic and World champions and the host nation received an automatic berth. Alongside the teams qualifying through the Olympic Qualification Tournament, twelve teams competed in this tournament.

Dates	Event	Location	Qualifier(s)
Host nation			United States
26 July – 6 August 1992	1992 Summer Olympics	Barcelona, Spain	Germany^{1}
4–15 October 1994	1994 Asian Games	Hiroshima, Japan	South Korea
23 November – 4 December 1994	1994 Hockey World Cup	Sydney, Australia	Pakistan
12–25 March 1995	1995 Pan American Games	Mar del Plata, Argentina	Argentina
22–27 May 1995	1995 Oceania Qualifying Tournament	Auckland, New Zealand	Australia
August 1995	1995 EuroHockey Nations Championship	Dublin, Ireland	—^{1}
13–23 September 1995	1995 All-Africa Games	Harare, Zimbabwe	South Africa
19–28 January 1996	Olympic Qualification Tournament	Barcelona, Spain	Netherlands; India; Great Britain; Spain; Malaysia

^1 – Germany qualified both as previous Olympic and continental champion, therefore that quota was added to the ones awarded by the Olympic Qualification Tournament to a total of 5.

== Umpires ==
- Amin Ayman (EGY)
- Santiago Deo (ESP)
- Henrik Ehlers (DEN)
- Steve Horgan (USA)
- Floris Idenburg (NED)
- Guillaume Langle (FRA)
- Craig Madden (GBR)
- Antonio Morales (ESP)
- Ray O'Connor (IRL)
- Yuri Platonov (RUS)
- Don Prior (AUS)
- Eduardo Ruiz (ARG)
- Kiyoshi Sana (JPN)
- Roger St. Rose (TRI)
- Patrick van Beneden (BEL)
- Sasidharan Vasutheven (MAS)
- Peter von Reth (NED)
- Richard Wolter (GER)

== Results ==
All times are Eastern Daylight Time (UTC−04:00)

=== Preliminary round ===
==== Pool A ====
Pos	Team	Pld	W	D	L	GF	GA	GD	Pts	Qualification
1	Spain	5	4	0	1	14	5	+9	8	Advanced to Semi-finals
2	Germany	5	3	1	1	10	3	+7	7	Advanced to Semi-finals
3	India	5	2	2	1	8	3	+5	6	
4	Pakistan	5	2	1	2	11	8	+3	5	
5	Argentina	5	2	0	3	9	13	−4	4	
6	United States (H)	5	0	0	5	3	23	−20	0	

Source: FIH
Rules for classification: 1) points; 2) goal difference; 3) games won; 4) head-to-head result.
(H) Hosts

20 July 1996
09:00

Spain	1–0	Germany
Arnau 50'	Report

Umpires:
Don Prior (AUS)
Craig Madden (GBR)

20 July 1996
17:30

Pakistan	4–0	United States
Shahbaz 10'; Ashraf 18', 25'; Zaman 62'	Report

Umpires:
Sasidharan Vasutheven (MAS)
Patrick van Beneden (BEL)

20 July 1996
20:00

India	0–1	Argentina
	Report	P. Lombi 45'

Umpires:
Peter von Reth (NED)
Amin Ayman (EGY)

22 July 1996
09:00

Pakistan	0–3	Spain
	Report	Arnau 22', 43'; Escarré 30'

Umpires:
Peter von Reth (NED)
Amin Ayman (EGY)

22 July 1996
17:30

Germany	1–1	India
Saliger 66'	Report	Mukesh 62'

Umpires:
Roger St Rose (TRI)
Floris Idenburg (NED)

22 July 1996
20:00

United States	2–5	Argentina
Mellor 39'; Jennings 48'	Report	J. Lombi 4', 12'; Ferrara 15', 26'; Capurro 32'

Umpires:
Yuri Platonov (RUS)
Don Prior (AUS)

24 July 1996
09:00

United States	0–4	India
	Report	Ramandeep 10'; Dhanraj 28', 46'; Sanjeev 69'

Umpires:
Craig Madden (GBR)
Guillaume Langle (FRA)

24 July 1996
17:30

Spain	2–1	Argentina
Escarré 61'; Arnau 65'	Report	J. Lombi 20'

Umpires:
Peter von Reth (NED)
Floris Idenburg (NED)

24 July 1996
20:00

Germany	3–1	Pakistan
Becker 6', 49'; Meinhardt 39'	Report	Khalid 62'

Umpires:
Don Prior (AUS)
Patrick van Beneden (BEL)

26 July 1996
09:00

Germany	3–0	Argentina
Saliger 16'; Becker 19'; Bellenbaum 64'	Report

Umpires:
Floris Idenburg (NED)
Don Prior (AUS)

26 July 1996
17:30

Pakistan	0–0	India
	Report

Umpires:
Peter von Reth (NED)
Craig Madden (GBR)

26 July 1996
20:00

Spain	7–1	United States
Amat 12', 14'; Escarré 25', 49'; Arnau 60'; Pujol 64'; Cobos 68'	Report	Butcher 37'

Umpires:
Yuri Platonov (RUS)
Roger St. Rose (TRI)

28 July 1996
09:00

Pakistan	6–2	Argentina
Ahmed 32', 45', 65'; Sarwar 51', 58'; Zaman 53'	Report	Pérez 24'; J. Lombi 68'

Umpires:
Amin Ayman (EGY)
Craig Madden (GBR)

28 July 1996
17:30

United States	0–3	Germany
	Report	Fischer 11', 22'; Blunck 23'

Umpires:
Sasidharan Vasutheven (MAS)
Peter von Reth (NED)

28 July 1996
20:00

Spain	1–3	India
Escudé 33'	Report	Ferreira 21', 41'; Sabu 59'

Umpires:
Ray O'Connor (IRL)
Kiyoshi Sana (JPN)

==== Pool B ====
Pos	Team	Pld	W	D	L	GF	GA	GD	Pts	Qualification
1	Netherlands	5	4	1	0	14	6	+8	9	Advanced to Semi-finals
2	Australia	5	3	1	1	13	7	+6	7	Advanced to Semi-finals
3	Great Britain	5	1	3	1	8	8	0	5	
4	South Korea	5	1	2	2	12	13	−1	4	
5	South Africa	5	0	3	2	7	12	−5	3	
6	Malaysia	5	0	2	3	7	15	−8	2	

Source: FIH
Rules for classification: 1) points; 2) goal difference; 3) games won; 4) head-to-head result.

21 July 1996
09:00

Netherlands	2–0	Malaysia
Klein 10'; Delissen 29'	Report

Umpires:
Ray O'Connor (IRL)
Eduardo Ruiz (ARG)

21 July 1996
17:30

Great Britain	2–2	South Korea
Giles 31', 50'	Report	Kang 35'; Park 68'

Umpires:
Kiyoshi Sana (JPN)
Henrik Ehlers (DEN)

21 July 1996
20:00

South Africa	1–1	Australia
Nicol 65'	Report	Hager 61'

Umpires:
Steve Horgan (USA)
Guillaume Langle (FRA)

23 July 1996
09:00

Netherlands	2–2	Great Britain
Bovelander 17'; Delissen 59'	Report	Garcia 27'; Giles 65'

Umpires:
Antonio Morales (ESP)
Richard Wolter (GER)

23 July 1996
17:30

Malaysia	2–2	South Africa
Nawawi 38', 61'	Report	Nicol 26'; W. Fulton 64'

Umpires:
Kiyoshi Sana (JPN)
Henrik Ehlers (DEN)

23 July 1996
20:00

Australia	3–2	South Korea
Davies 6'; Gaudoin 32'; Stacy 64'	Report	Park 9'; Shin 19'

Umpires:
Ray O'Connor (IRL)
Eduardo Ruiz (ARG)

25 July 1996
09:00

South Korea	3–3	South Africa
Park 27'; Shin 51'; Kim You. 60'	Report	Nicol 55', 68'; G. Fulton 67'

Umpires:
Henrik Ehlers (DEN)
Richard Wolter (GER)

25 July 1996
17:30

Malaysia	2–2	Great Britain
Nasiruddin 4'; Chairil 69'	Report	Shaw 41'; Giles 63'

Umpires:
Antonio Morales (ESP)
Amin Ayman (EGY)

25 July 1996
20:00

Netherlands	3–2	Australia
De Nooijer 12'; Bovelander 35'; Van den Honert 50'	Report	Sproule 10'; Hager 18'

Umpires:
Ray O'Connor (IRL)
Steve Horgan (USA)

27 July 1996
09:00

Malaysia	1–5	Australia
Nasiruddin 44'	Report	Davies 3'; Choppy 4', 6', 10'; Lewis 37'

Umpires:
Richard Wolter (GER)
Patrick van Beneden (BEL)

27 July 1996
17:30

South Africa	0–2	Great Britain
	Report	Wyatt 14'; Giles 28'

Umpires:
Steve Horgan (USA)
Eduardo Ruiz (ARG)

27 July 1996
20:00

Netherlands	3–1	South Korea
Van den Honert 47', 55'; De Nooijer 58'	Report	Kim You. 19'

Umpires:
Henrik Ehlers (DEN)
Roger St. Rose (TTO)

29 July 1996
09:00

Great Britain	0–2	Australia
	Report	Hager 5'; Stacy 28'

Umpires:
Richard Wolter (GER)
Henrik Ehlers (DEN)

29 July 1996
17:30

Malaysia	2–4	South Korea
Nasiruddin 60'; Nawawi 64'	Report	Kang 16', 40'; Park 39'; Kim J. 49'

Umpires:
Steve Horgan (USA)
Eduardo Ruiz (ARG)

29 July 1996
20:00

Netherlands	4–1	South Africa
Lomans 11', 26'; Delissen 13'; Van den Honert 54'	Report	Nicol 43'

Umpires:
Amin Ayman (EGY)
Ray O'Connor (IRL)

=== Classification round ===
==== Ninth- to twelfth-place classification ====
Crossover
31 July 1996
Argentina (pen.)	4 (3)
Malaysia	4 (0)
31 July 1996
South Africa	3
United States	0

Ninth Place
2 August 1996
Argentina	3
South Africa	2
Eleventh Place
2 August 1996
Malaysia	4
United States	1

===== Crossover =====
31 July 1996
08:30

Argentina	4–4 (a.e.t.)	Malaysia
Retegui 14', 55'; Ferrara 57'; J. Lombi 69'	Report	A. Singh 26'; Siva 38'; Nawawi 39'; Shamuganathan 59'
Penalties
	3–0

Umpires:
Patrick van Beneden (BEL)
Kiyoshi Sana (JPN)

31 July 1996
08:30

South Africa	3–0	United States
Nicol 34'; G. Fulton 46'; C. Fulton 62'	Report

Umpires:
Floris Idenburg (NED)
Amin Ayman (EGY)

===== Eleventh and twelfth place =====
1 August 1996
08:30

Malaysia	4–1	United States
Lim Chiow Chuan 34', 44'; Nawawi 38'; Shanmuganathan 56'	Report	Butcher 68'

Umpires:
Henrik Ehlers (DEN)
Antonio Morales (ESP)

===== Ninth and tenth place =====
1 August 1996
08:30

Argentina	3–2	South Africa
Ferrara 30'; Capurro 36'; J. Lombi 45'	Report	Nicol 22'; Hallowes 38'

Umpires:
Guillaume Langle (FRA)
Craig Madden (GBR)

==== Fifth to eighth place classification ====
Crossover
31 July 1996
India	3 (3)
South Korea (pen.)	3 (5)
31 July 1996
Great Britain	1
Pakistan	2

Fifth Place
2 August 1996
South Korea	3
Pakistan	1
Seventh Place
2 August 1996
India	3
Great Britain	4

===== Crossover =====
31 July 1996
11:00

India	3–3 (a.e.t.)	South Korea
R. Singh 14'; Ferreira 39'; Kumar 42'	Report	Shin Seok-kyo 22', 66'; Park Shin-heum 49'
Penalties
	3–5

Umpires:
Steve Horgan (USA)
Guillaume Langle (FRA)

31 July 1996
11:00

Great Britain	1–2	Pakistan
Giles 7'	Report	Sarwar 11'; R. Khan 65'

Umpires:
Henrik Ehlers (DEN)
Roger St. Rose (TRI)

===== Seventh and eighth place =====
2 August 1996
11:00

India	3–4	Great Britain
Dhillon 2'; R. Singh 29'; Powar 70'	Report	Shaw 24'; Laslett 43'; Wyatt 53'; Mayer 56'

Umpires:
Roger St. Rose (TRI)
Eduardo Ruiz (ARG)

===== Fifth and sixth place =====
2 August 1996
08:30

South Korea	3–1	Pakistan
Jeon Jong-ha 6'; Shin Seok-kyo 35'; Song Seung-tae 68'	Report	Ashraf 7'

Umpires:
Richard Wolter (GER)
Craig Madden (GBR)

== Medal round ==
Semi-finals
31 July 1996
Spain	2
Australia	1
31 July 1996
Netherlands	3
Germany	1

Gold-medal match
2 August 1996
Spain	1
Netherlands	3
Bronze-medal match
2 August 1996
Australia	3
Germany	2

=== Semi-finals ===
31 July 1996
17:30

Spain	2–1	Australia
P. Amat 45'; Escarré 54'	Report	Gaudoin 63'

Umpires:
Peter von Reth (NED)
Richard Wolter (GER)

31 July 1996
20:00

Germany	1–3	Netherlands
Meinhardt 60'	Report	Van den Honert 3', 45', 53'

Umpires:
Donald Prior (AUS)
Ray O'Connor (IRL)

=== Bronze-medal match ===
2 August 1996
17:00

(bronze) Australia	3–2	Germany
Stacy 14', 63'; Choppy 69'	Report	Meinhardt 40'; Domke 46'

Umpires:
Eduardo Ruiz (ARG)
Peter von Reth (NED)

=== Gold-medal match ===
2 August 1996
19:30

(silver) Spain	1–3	Netherlands (gold)
Pujol 45'	Report	Bovelander 52', 55'; Lomans 67'

Umpires:
Don Prior (AUS)
Ray O'Connor (IRL)

== Final rankings ==
As per statistical convention in field hockey, matches decided in regular time are counted as wins and losses, while matches decided by penalty shoot-outs are counted as draws.

Pos	Team	Pld	W	D	L	GF	GA	GD	Pts	Final result
1st place, gold medalist(s)	Netherlands	7	6	1	0	20	8	+12	19	Gold Medal
2nd place, silver medalist(s)	Spain	7	5	0	2	17	9	+8	15	Silver Medal
3rd place, bronze medalist(s)	Australia	7	4	1	2	17	11	+6	13	Bronze Medal
4	Germany	7	3	1	3	13	9	+4	10	Fourth place
5	South Korea	7	2	3	2	18	17	+1	9	Eliminated in group stage
6	Pakistan	7	3	1	3	14	12	+2	10	Eliminated in group stage
7	Great Britain	7	2	3	2	13	13	0	9	Eliminated in group stage
8	India	7	2	3	2	14	10	+4	9	Eliminated in group stage
9	Argentina	7	3	1	3	16	19	−3	10	Eliminated in group stage
10	South Africa	7	1	3	3	12	15	−3	6	Eliminated in group stage
11	Malaysia	7	1	3	3	15	20	−5	6	Eliminated in group stage
12	United States (H)	7	0	0	7	4	30	−26	0	Eliminated in group stage

Source: FIH
(H) Hosts

== Goalscorers ==
There were 173 goals scored in 42 matches, for an average of 4.12 goals per match.

7 goals

- (Netherlands) Taco van den Honert
- (South Africa) Greg Nicol

6 goals

- (Argentina) Jorge Lombi
- (United Kingdom) Calum Giles

5 goals

- (Spain) Juan Escarré
- (South Korea) Park Shin-heum
- (Malaysia) Mirnawan Nawawi

4 goals

- (Argentina) Fernando Ferrara
- (Australia) Baeden Choppy
- (Australia) Jay Stacy
- (Spain) Javier Arnau
- (South Korea) Shin Seok-kyu
- (Netherlands) Floris Jan Bovelander

3 goals

- (Argentina) Santiago Capurro
- (Australia) Mark Hager
- (Spain) Victor Pujol
- (Germany) Andreas Becker
- (Germany) Sven Meinhardt
- (India) Gavin Ferreira
- (India) Ramandeep Singh
- (South Korea) Kang Keon-wook
- (Malaysia) Nor Saiful Nasiruddin
- (Netherlands) Bram Lomans
- (Netherlands) Marc Delissen
- (Pakistan) Kamran Ashraf
- (Pakistan) Muhammad Sarwar
- (Pakistan) Shahbaz Ahmed
- (South Africa) Grant Fulton

2 goals

- (Argentina) Carlos Retegui
- (Australia) Paul Gaudoin
- (Australia) Stephen Davies
- (Spain) Pol Amat
- (United Kingdom) John Shaw
- (United Kingdom) Jon Wyatt
- (Germany) Carsten Fischer
- (Germany) Stefan Saliger
- (India) Dhanraj Pillay
- (India) Mukesh Kumar
- (South Korea) Kim Young-kyu
- (Malaysia) Lim Chiow Chuan
- (Malaysia) Kuhan Shanmuganathan
- (Netherlands) Teun de Nooijer
- (Pakistan) Tahir Zaman
- (United States) Nick Butcher

1 goal

- (Argentina) Rodolfo Pérez
- (Australia) Daniel Sproule
- (Australia) Paul Lewis
- (Spain) Ignacio Cobos
- (Spain) Jordi Arnau
- (Spain) Xavier Escudé
- (United Kingdom) Chris Mayer
- (United Kingdom) Jason Laslett
- (United Kingdom) Russell Garcia
- (Germany) Christian Blunck
- (Germany) Oliver Domke
- (Germany) Patrick Bellenbaum
- (India) Baljit Singh Dhillon
- (India) Pargat Singh
- (India) Sabu Varkey
- (India) Sanjeev Kumar
- (South Korea) Jong Ho-jeon
- (South Korea) Kim Jong-yi
- (South Korea) Shin Seo-jyo
- (South Korea) Song Seung-tae
- (Malaysia) Aphtar Singh
- (Malaysia) Brian Siva
- (Malaysia) Chairi Abdul Aziz
- (Netherlands) Leo Klein Gebbink
- (Pakistan) Muhammad Khalid
- (Pakistan) Muhammad Shahbaz
- (Pakistan) Rahim Khan
- (South Africa) Craig Fulton
- (South Africa) Matthew Hallowes
- (United States) Marq Mellor
- (United States) Steve Jennings
