= Hockey at the 1998 Commonwealth Games – Men's tournament =

1998 Commonwealth Games – Men's hockey
Tournament details
- Host country: Malaysia
- City: Kuala Lumpur
- Dates: 9 September – 20 September
- Teams: 11

Final positions
- Champions: Australia (1st title)
- Runner-up: Malaysia
- Third place: England

Tournament statistics
- Matches played: 29
- Goals scored: 143 (4.93 per match)

The first edition of the field hockey Men's Hockey Tournament at the Commonwealth Games took place during the 1998 Commonwealth Games at the Bukit Jalil Stadium in Kuala Lumpur, Malaysia. The event started on Wednesday 9 September and ended on Sunday 20 September 1998.

== Participating nations ==
Pool A	Pool B
Australia; India; New Zealand; South Africa; Trinidad and Tobago; Wales	Canada; England; Kenya; Malaysia; Pakistan

== Round robin ==
=== Pool A ===
	Team	Points	G	W	D	L	GF	GA	Diff
1.	Australia	12	5	4	0	1	20	5	+15
2.	India	12	5	4	0	1	21	10	+11
3.	South Africa	10	5	3	1	1	25	11	+14
4.	New Zealand	7	5	2	1	2	11	8	+3
5.	Wales	3	5	1	0	4	6	20	–14
6.	Trinidad and Tobago	0	5	0	0	5	3	32	–29

All times local (UTC +8)

- Wednesday 9 September 1998

Match 3
20:35

Australia	5–2	India
Davies 2', 20'; Vivian-Taylor 28'; Brennan 44'; Hiskins 58'	Report	Tirkey 38'; Pillay 44'

- Thursday 10 September 1998

Match 4
18:05

Wales	2–0	Trinidad

Match 6
20:35

New Zealand	3–3	South Africa

- Saturday 12 September 1998

Match 7
16:05

South Africa	1–2	India
Nicol 22'	Report	Prabhakaran 59'; Dhillon 68'

Match 9
19:35

Trinidad	0–7	Australia

Match 10
20:35

Wales	0–4	New Zealand

- Monday 14 September 1998

Match 13
16:05

New Zealand	3–0	Trinidad

Match 14
18:05

Australia	2–3	South Africa

Match 15
20:35

India	6–3	Wales
Pillay 4'; Tirkey 7'; Dhillon 19', 60'; Prabhakaran 28'; Kumar 67'	Report	Hacker 17'; Organ 33', 48'

- Tuesday 15 September 1998

Match 17
19:35

New Zealand	0–2	Australia

- Wednesday 16 September 1998

Match 19
18:05

Trinidad	0–8	India

Match 20
19:35

Wales	1–6	South Africa

- Thursday 17 September 1998

Match 23
18:05

Australia	4–0	Wales

Match 24
19:35

India	3–1	New Zealand

Match 25
20:35

South Africa	12–3	Trinidad

=== Pool B ===
	Team	Points	G	W	D	L	GF	GA	Diff
1.	Malaysia	8	4	2	2	0	9	4	+5
2.	England	8	4	2	2	0	9	6	+3
3.	Canada	5	4	1	2	1	11	6	+5
4.	Pakistan	5	4	1	2	1	11	11	0
5.	Kenya	0	4	0	0	4	5	18	–13

All times local (UTC +8)

- Wednesday 9 September 1998

Match 1
18:05

Pakistan	5 – 4	Kenya

Match 2
19:35

England	1 – 1	Canada

- Thursday 10 September 1998

Match 5
19:35

Kenya	0 – 4	Malaysia

- Saturday 12 September 1998

Match 8
18:05

Canada	3 – 3	Pakistan

- Sunday 13 September 1998

Match 11
18:05

England	3 – 1	Kenya

Match 12
20:05

Pakistan	1 – 1	Malaysia

- Tuesday 15 September 1998

Match 16
18:05

Malaysia	2 – 2	England

Match 18
20:35

Kenya	0 – 6	Canada

- Wednesday 16 September 1998

Match 21
20:35

Pakistan	2 – 3	England

- Thursday 17 September 1998

Match 22
16:05

Canada	1 – 2	Malaysia

== Play–offs ==
Semi-finals
19 September 1998
Australia (a.e.t)	3
England	2
19 September 1998
Malaysia	1
India	0

Final
20 September 1998
Australia (a.e.t)	4
Malaysia	0
Third Place
20 September 1998
England (pen.)	1 (4)
India	1 (2)

=== Semi-finals ===
19 September 1998
18:35

Australia	3–2 (a.e.t.)	England
Smith 58'; Hiskins 67'; Brennan 72'		Wyatt 57'; Garcia 63'

19 September 1998
20:35

Malaysia	1–0 (a.e.t.)	India
Mirnawan 77'	Report

=== Bronze-medal match ===
20 September 1998
18:35

England	1–1 (a.e.t.)	India
Fordham 54'	Report	Baljit 15'
Penalties
Wyatt (penalty shoot-out scored); Garcia (penalty shoot-out scored); Woods (penalty shoot-out scored); Garrard (penalty shoot-out scored)	4–2	(penalty shoot-out missed) Baljit; (penalty shoot-out missed) Riaz; (penalty shoot-out scored) Daljit; (penalty shoot-out scored) Ramandeep

=== Gold-medal match ===
20 September 1998
20:35

Australia	4–0	Malaysia
Commens 3'; Brennan 19', 50'; Davies 30'

== Final ranking ==
RANK	TEAM
1.	Australia
2.	Malaysia
3.	England
4.	India
—	South Africa
—	New Zealand
—	Wales
—	Trinidad and Tobago
—	Canada
—	Pakistan
—	Kenya

== Awards ==
1998 Men's Hockey Commonwealth Games winners

Australia
First title

== Medalists ==
Event	Gold	Silver	Bronze
Men	Australia; Australia; Michael Brennan; Adam Commens; Stephen Davies; Damon Diletti; Jason Duff; James Elmer; Paul Gaudoin; Mark Hickman; Jeremy Hiskins; Stephen Holt; Brent Livermore; Matthew Smith; Daniel Sproule; Jay Stacy; Lachlan Vivian-Taylor; Michael York	Malaysia; Malaysia; Nur Azlan Bakar; Nor Saiful Zaini; Mirnawan Nawawi; Roslan Jamaluddin; Calvin Fernandez; Gobinathan Krishnamurthy; Maninderjit Singh; Chairil Anwar Abdul Aziz; K. Keevan Raj; Kuhan Shanmuganathan; Mohd Madzli Ikmar; R. Shanker; M. Kaliswaran; K. Logan Raj; Mohamad Syayrin Uda Karim; Suhaimi Ibrahim; Chua Boon Huat	England; England; Bobby Crutchley; Guy Fordham; Julian Halls; Stuart Head; Russell Garcia; Brett Garrard; Michael Johnson; David Luckes; Simon Mason; Mark Pearn; Justin Pidcock; Ben Sharpe; Jimmy Wallis; Bill Waugh; Duncan Woods; Jon Wyatt
