= Brett Garrard =

British field hockey player (born 1976)

Personal information
- Born: 21 August 1976 (age 50) Brentford, Greater London, England
- Height: 182 cm (6 ft 0 in)
- Weight: 70 kg (154 lb)

Sport
- Sport: Field hockey
- Position: Defender
Senior career
| Years | Team | Caps | Goals |
| –1997 | Surbiton | - | - |
| 1997–1998 | Guildford | - | - |
| 1998–1999 | Teddington | - | - |
| 1999–2006 | Surbiton | - | - |
National team
| Years | Team | Caps | Goals |
| 1997–2008 | GB | 70 | - |
| 1997–2008 | England | 193 | - |
Medal record
Men's field hockey
Representing England
Commonwealth Games
| Bronze medal – third place | 1998 Kuala Lumpur | Team |
European Championship
| Bronze medal – third place | 1999 Padua | Team |
| Bronze medal – third place | 2003 Barcelona | Team |

Brett Spencer Garrard (born 21 August 1976) is a British former field hockey player. Garrard competed in the 2000 Summer Olympics and in the 2004 Summer Olympics.

== Biography ==
Garrard played club hockey for Surbiton in the Men's England Hockey League before joining Guildford for one season and Teddington for two seasons.

Garrard made his England debut on 16 March 1997 against Pakistan. After joining Teddington he represented England and won a bronze medal in the men's hockey, at the 1998 Commonwealth Games in Kuala Lumpur and participated in the 1998 Men's Hockey World Cup.

Garrad returned to Surbiton for the 1999/2000 season and during his second spell at Surbiton he made his first Olympic appearance representing Great Britain at the 2000 Olympic Games in Sydney.

He then competed at the 2002 Commonwealth Games, and at 2004 Olympic Games in Athens he captained the Great Britain team.

Garrard represented England at the 2006 Commonwealth Games in Melbourne, where he was again captain of the team.

Garrad retired from international hockey in 2008 and later as a coach won eight consecutive Premier League titles with Surbiton Ladies 1st Team.

Garrard joined Epsom College as the director of hockey in September 2023.
