= 1994 World Cup (disambiguation) =

The 1994 World Cup was the 15th edition of the FIFA international association football tournament.

1994 World Cup may also refer to:

- 1994 IAAF World Cup
- 1994 Men's Hockey World Cup
- 1994 Alpine Skiing World Cup
