= Craig Fulton =

South African field hockey player

- Born: 6 November 1974 (age 51); Salisbury, Rhodesia
- Spouse: Natalie Fulton (m. 2004)
- Children: 3, Milla Fulton; Jake Fulton
- Relatives: Grant Fulton (brother)
- Field hockey career
- Height: 5 ft 8.5 in (174.0 cm)
- Sport: Field hockey
- Position: Midfielder/Forward
Senior career
Years	Team	Caps	Goals
199x–1998	Northern Transvaal	-	-
1999–2005	Chelmsford	-	-
2005–2010	Pembroke Wanderers	-	-
National team
Years	Team	Caps	Goals
1996–2005	South Africa	191	(2)
Coaching career
- 1999–2005: Chelmsford
- 199x–200x: Felsted School
- 2005–2010: Pembroke Wanderers
- 2010–2014: University of Pretoria
- 2010–2014: Northern Blues
- 2014–2018: Ireland
- 2018–2023: Belgium (assistant)
- 2023–: India
Medal record
Representing South Africa
Africa Cup of Nations
Gold medal – first place	1996 Pretoria
Gold medal – first place	2000 Bulawayo

Craig Fulton (born 6 November 1974) is a South African coach and former field hockey player. He currently coaches the India men's national team and formerly coached the Ireland men's national team. As a player he represented South Africa at the 1996 and 2004 Summer Olympics and at the 2002 Men's Hockey World Cup. As a player-coach with Pembroke Wanderers he won two Irish Senior Cups, two Men's Irish Hockey League titles and the EuroHockey Club Trophy. As a coach Fulton guided Ireland to third place at the 2015 Men's EuroHockey Nations Championship and to qualification for both the 2016 Summer Olympics and the 2018 Men's Hockey World Cup. While coaching Ireland, Fulton was named the 2015 FIH Men's Coach of the Year. He was assistant coach of the Belgium team that won the 2018 Men's Hockey World Cup. He is currently the coach of the India men's national field hockey team and guided them to an Olympic bronze medal at the 2024 Summer Olympics.

== Early years and education ==
Fulton was educated at Pretoria Boys High School and Stellenbosch University.

== Domestic teams ==
=== Chelmsford ===
Between 1999 and 2005 Fulton served as player/coach of Chelmsford in the Men's England Hockey League. In September 2002, while in Pretoria, Fulton was hospitalised after he and his then girlfriend and later wife Natalie, interrupted a suspected burglar at his home. Fulton was reportedly stabbed or slashed seven times during the incident. In 2004 he guided Chelmsford to promotion to the Premier Division. During this time Fulton also coached field hockey at Felsted School.

=== Pembroke Wanderers ===
In 2005 Fulton was appointed director of coaching and player/coach to the senior men's team at Pembroke Wanderers. With a team that included David and Conor Harte, Ronan Gormley, Stuart Loughrey, Justin Sheriff, Alan Sothern and Ian Symons, Fulton subsequently guided Wanderers to five national titles in four seasons. These included the 2006 All-Ireland Men's Club Championship, two Irish Senior Cup wins in 2008 and 2009 and to two Men's Irish Hockey League titles in 2008–09 and 2009–10. They also won the 2009 EuroHockey Club Trophy.

== South Africa international ==
Fulton represented South Africa at the 1996 and 2004 Summer Olympics and at the 2002 Men's Hockey World Cup. His brother, Grant, and his wife, Natalie, were also South Africa field hockey internationals. The brothers were teammates at the 1996 Olympics. In 2004 Fulton and his wife became the first married couple to represent South Africa at the same Olympic Games.

Tournaments	Place
1996 Hockey Africa Cup of Nations	1st
1996 Summer Olympics	10th
1998 Commonwealth Games	5th
1997 Men's Hockey World Cup Qualifier	9th
2000 Hockey Africa Cup of Nations	1st
2001 Men's Hockey Champions Challenge	2nd
2002 Men's Hockey World Cup	13th
2002 Commonwealth Games	4th
2003 Men's Hockey Champions Challenge	3rd
2004 Men's Field Hockey Olympic Qualifier	7th
2004 Summer Olympics	10th
2005 Sultan Azlan Shah Cup	7th

== Coach ==
=== South Africa ===
Between 2011 and 2014, after returning to South Africa, Fulton held several coaching positions including serving as Assistant Coach of both the women's (2011) and men's (2013–2014) national teams. He also coached the Northern Blues at interprovincial level and served as technical director with the University of Pretoria while his wife, Natalie, served as the club manager.

=== Ireland ===
Between 2006 and 2009, in addition to being player/coach at Pembroke Wanderers, Fulton also served as Assistant Coach of the Ireland men's national field hockey team, first to Dave Passmore and then to Paul Revington. In 2014 he succeeded Andrew Meredith as the senior Ireland coach. Fulton subsequently guided Ireland to third place at the 2015 Men's EuroHockey Nations Championship, to World League Round 2 tournament wins in 2015 and 2017 and to qualification for both the 2016 Summer Olympics and the 2018 Men's Hockey World Cup. While coaching Ireland, Fulton was also named the 2015 FIH Men's Coach of the Year. In May 2018 he resigned as Ireland coach after accepting an offer to become Belgium's assistant coach.

=== Belgium ===
In May 2018 Fulton was appointed Assistant Coach of the Belgium men's national field hockey team. He was assistant coach when Belgium won the 2018 Men's Hockey World Cup and Field hockey at the 2020 Summer Olympics.

=== India ===
In March 2023 Fulton was appointed as Head Coach of the Indian national hockey team. He guided Indian hockey team to a bronze medal in 2024 Paris Olympics

== Personal life ==
His brother Grant and wife Natalie were also South Africa field hockey players. In 2004, Fulton and his wife became the first married couple to represent South Africa at the same Olympic Games.

His child, Milla, were Ireland indoor hockey player, 2023 Nkosi Cup in senior caps. and Ireland U21 in 2025 Junior World Cup. His child, Jake, were Ireland U21 in 2025 Junior World Cup.

== Honours ==
=== Player ===
South Africa

- Hockey Africa Cup of Nations
  - Winners: 1996, 2000: 2
- Men's Hockey Champions Challenge
  - Runners up: 2001: 1

=== Player/coach ===
Pembroke Wanderers

- EuroHockey Club Trophy
  - Winners: 2009: 1
- Men's Irish Hockey League
  - Winners: 2008–09, 2009–10: 2
- Irish Senior Cup
  - Winners: 2008, 2009: 2
- All-Ireland Men's Club Championship
  - Winners: 2006: 1

=== Coach ===
Ireland

- Hamburg Masters
  - Winners: 2017
- Men's FIH Hockey World League Round 2
  - Winners: 2015 San Diego, 2017 Belfast
- Men's Hockey Investec Cup
  - Runners up: 2014

Individual

- FIH Men's Coach of the Year
  - Winner: 2015
- ESPN India Award: Coach of the Year
  - Winner: 2024
