= Austin Smith (field hockey) =

South African field hockey player

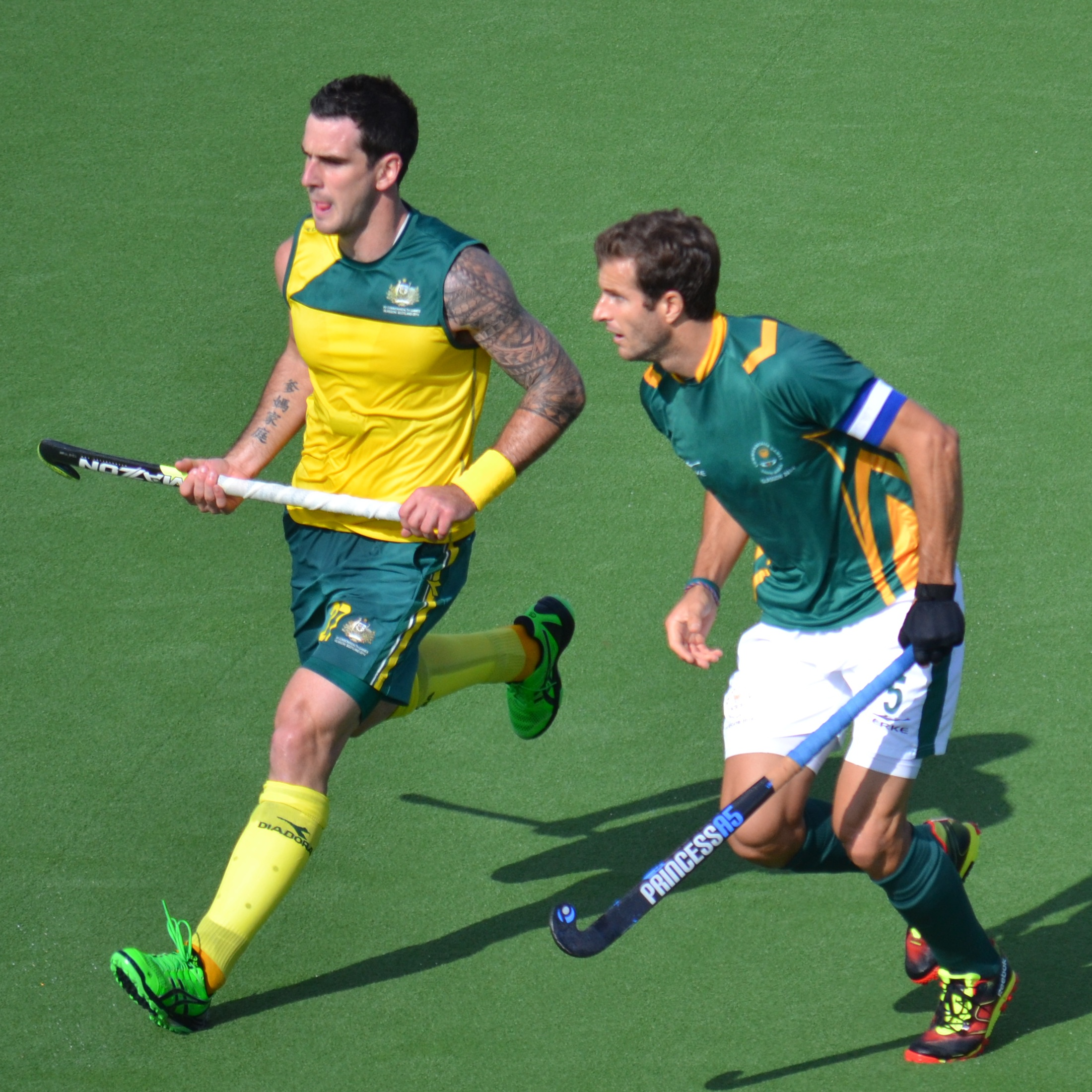
- Smith (right) at the 2014 Commonwealth Games

Personal information
- Full name: Austin Charles Smith
- Born: 20 May 1985 (age 41) Cape Town, South Africa
- Height: 1.79 m (5 ft 10 in)
- Weight: 73 kg (161 lb)

Sport
- Sport: Field hockey
- Position: Defender
- Club: Den Bosch
Senior career
Years	Team	Caps	Goals
2005–2009	Reading	-	-
2009–2023	Den Bosch	-	-
National team
Years	Team	Caps	Goals
2004–2021	South Africa	183	(45)
Medal record
Africa Cup of Nations
Gold medal – first place	2013 Nairobi
- Updated on 2021-12-21

Austin Charles Smith (born 20 May 1985) is a South African field hockey player who plays as a defender for Dutch club HC Den Bosch and formerly the South African national team.

In late 2021, Austin Smith announced his retirement from International Hockey. Smith has been a substitute supervisor and teacher in the International School Eindhoven in recent years.

Smith competed for South Africa at the 2008 and 2012 Summer Olympics, the 2010 and 2014 Hockey World Cups, and at the 2010 and 2014 Commonwealth Games. He has also competed at the 2005, 2009 and 2011 Men's Champions Challenge. He became captain of the side in 2009. He also joined in the Tokyo 2021 Summer Olympics and played for the South African national team.

He retired from club hockey after 14 years with Den Bosch in 2023.

== Biography ==
Smith was born in Cape Town, Western Cape, South Africa. He started hockey at the age of five years, and his parents played hockey for several years in South Africa and England. At Smith's Primary School, Pinelands North, he was introduced to hockey, among other sports. His coach at Pinelands, Murray Anderson, inspired Smith to focus on hockey.

When Smith started at Pinelands High School, he had already succeeded, representing his Province at the U13 level. He went on to represent South Africa's U16 and U18 teams and became captain of each. He attributes a large amount of his achievement to one factor: "I was extremely lucky to have such dedicated coaches at both my Primary and High School. Michael McConnachie, who spearheaded the hockey at the High School, was my biggest mentor and made me truly believe in myself."

In March 2004, aged 18, Smith achieved his lifelong dream of representing his country at a senior level. "It was an incredible feeling walking onto the field to play my first match for South Africa, and it remains a special moment every time I wear the green and gold." In 2005 Austin represented South Africa at the U21 World Cup in Rotterdam, the Netherlands.

Smith moved to the United Kingdom in 2005 to join Reading Hockey Club. He spent four seasons at Reading, winning the Premier League twice and making the final eight of the Euro Hockey League on consecutive occasions.

2008 was a defining year in Smith's hockey career as he achieved another childhood dream by attending the Olympic Games. Despite South Africa's final placing of 12th in Beijing, he was the team's top goal scorer with four goals. To finish the year, he was named South African Men's Hockey Player of the Year and Reading Hockey Club's Player of the Year.

In 2009 Smith decided to leave the UK to join HC 's-Hertogenbosch in The Netherlands. Earlier in the year, he was named the captain of the South African squad, leading them to victory in the African Championship to qualify for the World Cup in 2010. Smith was also named in the World All-Star Team for his performances in 2009.

In 2010 Smith captained the South African squad at the World Cup and the Commonwealth Games, where they finished in 10th and 5th, respectively. Later in the year, he was named South African Men's Hockey Player of the Year for a second time. He announced his retirement from international play on 9 September 2021.
