= Querejeta =

Surname

Querejeta is a surname. Notable people with the surname include:

- Elías Querejeta (born 1934), Spanish film producer
- Gracia Querejeta (born 1962), Spanish film director
- Jorge Querejeta (born 1968), former field hockey player from Argentina
- José Antonio Querejeta (born 1957), former basketball player for Spain
- José María Querejeta (1919–1989), Spanish footballer
