= Murray Anderson =

Murray Anderson may refer to:

- Murray Anderson (ice hockey) (born 1949), retired Canadian ice hockey defenceman
- Murray Anderson (field hockey) (born 1968), South African former field hockey player
- Murray C. Anderson, South African composer, recording engineer and producer
- Admiral Sir David Murray Anderson (1874–1936), Governor of New South Wales
