= Ben Sharpe =

British field hockey player

Personal information
- Born: 31 July 1973 (age 53) Sutton Coldfield, Warwickshire, England
- Height: 182 cm (6 ft 0 in)
- Weight: 75 kg (165 lb)

Sport
- Sport: Field hockey
- Position: Midfielder
Senior career
Years	Team	Caps	Goals
1992–2005	Cannock	-	-
National team
Years	Team	Caps	Goals
–	GB & England	144	-
Medal record
Men's field hockey
Representing England
Commonwealth Games
Bronze medal – third place	1998 Kuala Lumpur	Team
European Championship
Bronze medal – third place	1995 Dublin	Team
Bronze medal – third place	1999 Padua	Team

Benjamin John Sharpe (born 31 July 1973) is a British former field hockey player who competed in the 2000 Summer Olympics.

== Biography ==
Sharpe was educated at Repton School and was called up to the England U17 squad in 1990.

Sharpe played club hockey for Cannock in the Men's England Hockey League and worked his way through to the Cannock first team after starting with the Cannock 5ths. While at Cannock he represented England and won a bronze medal, at the 1998 Commonwealth Games in Kuala Lumpur and participated in the 1998 Men's Hockey World Cup.

Still at Cannock, he represented Great Britain at the 2000 Olympic Games in Sydney.

At international retirement he had won 144 caps.
