= Edamura =

Edamura is a Japanese surname. Notable people with the surname include:

- Rob Edamura (born 1965), Canadian field hockey player
- Takuma Edamura (枝村 匠馬) (born 1986), Japanese footballer
