= Julian Halls =

British field hockey player (born 1967)

Personal information
- Born: 17 April 1967 (age 59) Rochford, Essex, England
- Height: 181 cm (5 ft 11 in)
- Weight: 82 kg (181 lb)

Sport
- Sport: Field hockey
- Position: Defender
Senior career
Years	Team	Caps	Goals
1989–1998	Old Loughtonians	-	-
1995	Canberra	-	-
1998	Haagsche Delftsche Mixed	-	-
1998–2000	Cannock	-	-
2000–2005	St Albans	-	-
National team
Years	Team	Caps	Goals
–	GB	59	-
–	England	125	-
Medal record
Men's field hockey
Representing England
Commonwealth Games
Bronze medal – third place	1998 Kuala Lumpur	Team
European Championship
Bronze medal – third place	1995 Dublin	Team
Bronze medal – third place	1999 Padua	Team

Julian Halls (born 17 April 1967) is a British former field hockey player who competed in the 1996 Summer Olympics and in the 2000 Summer Olympics.

== Biography ==
Halls played club hockey for Old Loughtonians in the Men's England Hockey League, becoming the club captain. He appeared at the 1990 Men's Hockey World Cup and the 1994 Men's Hockey World Cup and played for Old Loughtonians until they lost him for the best part of 1995, when he switched to play his club hockey for Canberra in Australia.

Returning to Old Loughtonians, Halls represented Great Britain at the 1996 Olympic Games in Atlanta before going the Netherlands to play for Haagsche Delftsche Mixed.

He represented England and won a bronze medal in the men's hockey, at the 1998 Commonwealth Games in Kuala Lumpur. Shortly after the Commonwealth Games, Halls made his Cannock debut in October 1988.

While at Cannock, Halls represented Great Britain at the 2000 Olympic Games in Sydney. After the Olympics, Halls joined St Albans as a player coach for the 2000/01 season.

At international retirement he had won 59 caps for Great Britain and 125 caps for England and returned to Old Loughtonians as Director of Coaching in 2010.
