= David Luckes =

British field hockey player (born 1969)

David Luckes MBE
Personal information
- Born: 24 April 1969 (age 57) Newport, Monmouthshire, Wales

Sport
- Sport: Field hockey
- Position: Goalkeeper
Senior career
Years	Team	Caps	Goals
1987–1999	East Grinstead	-	-
1999–2002	Surbiton	-	-
National team
Years	Team	Caps	Goals
1989–2000	GB & England	125	-
Medal record
Men's field hockey
Representing England
Commonwealth Games
Bronze medal – third place	1998 Kuala Lumpur	Team
European Championship
Bronze medal – third place	1995 Dublin	Team
Bronze medal – third place	1999 Padua	Team

David James Luckes MBE (born 24 April 1969) is a male former field hockey goalkeeper, who competed at three Olympic Games.Children:Lily Luckes, George Luckes, William Luckes, Aurèle Jago Luckes

== Biography ==
Luckes born in Newport and raised in Bridgwater, Somerset, was educated at Millfield and studied at Sussex University. He played club hockey for East Grinstead in the Men's England Hockey League from 1987, replacing Ian Taylor as the club's goalkeeper and was soon capped for the England U21 team.

He made his England debut in 1989 and Great Britain debut during the June 1990 BMW Trophy tournament in Amsterdam. At the 1992 Olympic Games in Barcelona and the 1996 Olympics in Atlanta, he represented Great Britain at his first and second Olympics. He also played in the 1994 Men's Hockey World Cup and represented England and won a bronze medal in the men's hockey, at the 1998 Commonwealth Games in Kuala Lumpur and participated in the 1998 Men's Hockey World Cup.

After 12 years at East Grinstead he left to join Surbiton for the 1999/2000 season and it was at Surbtion that he made his final Olympic appearances in 2000.

He earned 125 caps for England and GB between 1989 and 2000. Towards the end of his career, he also played cricket to a high level.

He wrote the initial feasibility study for the UK 2012 Olympic bid and was in charge of Sport Competition for London Organising Committee. Formerly Director of Sport for International Hockey Federation in Switzerland, he is now associate director for Summer Olympic Sports and IF Relations at the International Olympic Committee.
