= Bill Waugh =

British field hockey player (born 1973)

Personal information
- Born: 20 January 1973 (age 53)
- Height: 185 cm (6 ft 1 in)
- Weight: 84 kg (185 lb)

Sport
- Sport: Field hockey
Senior career
Years	Team	Caps	Goals
1991–2001	Southgate	-	-
2001–2004	Surbiton	-	-
National team
Years	Team	Caps	Goals
–	GB	15	-
–	England	121	-
Medal record
Men's field hockey
Representing England
Commonwealth Games
Bronze medal – third place	1998 Kuala Lumpur	Team
European Championship
Bronze medal – third place	1999 Padua	Team

William Waugh (born 20 January 1973) is a British former field hockey player who competed in the 2000 Summer Olympics.

== Biography ==
Waugh was educated at Wellington College, Berkshire, where he played hockey until being signed by Southgate in the Men's England Hockey League. He made his international debut in New Delhi, India, on 4 February 1995 against Kazakhstan, losing 0-1, and over the course of his career amassed a total of 121 caps for England and 15 caps for Great Britain. He also captained England at all levels, with the highlight being his captainship of the England team in the Commonwealth Games in Kuala Lumpur in 1998, where England won a bronze medal and captain at the 1998 Men's Hockey World Cup.

At the 2000 Olympic Games in Sydney, he represented Great Britain.

He left Southgate for Surbiton and while at Surbiton he represented England at the 2002 Commonwealth Games in Manchester. Waugh announced his retirement from international hockey in 2002.

Post-retirement he took up roles in banking with UBS and Credit Suisse before returning to UBS in 2025.

Bill's son, Sam Waugh, is a professional rugby player who represented Loughborough Students RUFC and subsequently signed for Newcastle Red Bulls.
