= Chris Gifford =

Chris Gifford may refer to:

- Chris Gifford (field hockey) (born 1966), former field hockey striker from Canada
- Chris Gifford (writer), writer and executive producer at Nickelodeon
