= Matthew Smith (field hockey) =

Australian field hockey player

Personal information
- Full name: Matthew John Smith
- Born: 20 November 1973 (age 52) Tamworth, New South Wales
- Height: 174 cm (5 ft 9 in)
- Weight: 73 kg (161 lb)
Medal record
Men's field hockey
Representing Australia
Olympic Games
Bronze medal – third place	1996 Atlanta	Team
Champions Trophy
Silver medal – second place	1995 Berlin	Team
Silver medal – second place	2001 Rotterdam	Team
Commonwealth Games
Gold medal – first place	1998 Kuala Lumpur	Team
Gold medal – first place	2002 Manchester	Team

Matthew John Smith (born 20 November 1973 in Tamworth, New South Wales) is a former field hockey player from Australia, who was a member of the Men's National Hockey Team that won the bronze medal at the 1996 Summer Olympics in Atlanta, Georgia. He played club hockey for the North Coast Raiders.
