= Michael Johnson (field hockey) =

British field hockey player (born 1979)

Personal information
- Born: 27 August 1979 (age 46) Walsall, West Midlands, England
- Height: 179 cm (5 ft 10 in)
- Weight: 75 kg (165 lb)

Sport
- Sport: Field hockey
Senior career
Years	Team	Caps	Goals
1997–2009	Cannock	-	-
National team
Years	Team	Caps	Goals
–	GB & England	168	-
Medal record
Men's field hockey
Representing England
Commonwealth Games
Bronze medal – third place	1998 Kuala Lumpur	Team
European Championship
Bronze medal – third place	1999 Padua	Team
Bronze medal – third place	2003 Barcelona	Team

Michael Edward Johnson (born 27 August 1979) is a male British former field hockey player. He competed at the 2000 Summer Olympics and 2004 Summer Olympics.

== Biography ==
Johnson made his senior hockey debut aged 18 and played club hockey for Cannock in the Men's England Hockey League.

He made his England debut against Italy in February 1998 and represented England and won a bronze medal in the men's hockey, at the 1998 Commonwealth Games in Kuala Lumpur

At the 2000 Olympic Games in Sydney, he represented Great Britain

Still at Cannock, Johnson represented England at the 2002 Commonwealth Games in Manchester and two years later at the 2004 Olympic Games in Athens he represented Great Britain in the field hockey tournament again.

At international retirement he had won a total of 168 international caps.

Johnson was hockey coach at Hampstead and Westminster Hockey Club, Cannock and Olton and West Warwicks. He currently working within Education, as Director of Sport at Epsom College having previously worked at King Edward's School, Bablake School, and Rugby School.
