= Paul Chohan =

Canadian field hockey player

Medal record

Men's field hockey

Representing Canada

Pan American Games
Silver medal – second place	1975 Mexico City	Team
Silver medal – second place	1979 San Juan	Team
Gold medal – first place	1983 Caracas	Team
Gold medal – first place	1987 Indianapolis	Team
Silver medal – second place	1991 Havana	Team
Silver medal – second place	1995 Mar Del Plata	Team and Flag bearer

Paul Satinder "Bubli" Chohan (born 2 July 1957 in Ludhiana, Punjab, India) is an Indian-born Canadian former field hockey player who represented Canada 317 times in international competition. This includes 3 World Cups and 3 Olympic Games (Montreal 1975, Los Angeles 1984, Seoul 1988) on top of the 6 PanAm games.

== International senior competitions ==
- 1975 – Pan American Games, Mexico (2nd)
- 1976 – Olympic Games, Montreal (10th)
- 1978 – World Cup, Buenos Aires (11th)
- 1979 – Pan American Games, San Juan (2nd)
- 1981 – World Cup Qualifier, Kuala Lumpur (9th)
- 1983 – Pan American Games, Caracas (1st)
- 1984 – Olympic Games, Los Angeles (10th)
- 1985 – World Cup Qualifier, Barcelona (4th)
- 1986 – World Cup, London (10th)
- 1987 – Pan American Games, Indianapolis (1st)
- 1988 – Olympic Games, Seoul (11th)
- 1989 – World Cup Qualifier, Madison, USA (2nd)
- 1990 – World Cup, Lahore (11th)
- 1991 – Pan American Games, Havana (2nd)
- 1995 – Pan American Games, Mar del Plata (2nd)
- 1996 – Olympic Qualifier, Barcelona (6th)
- 1996 – World Cup Preliminary, Sardinia (2nd)
- 1997 – World Cup Qualifier, Kuala Lumpur (5th)
