= Damon Diletti =

Australian field hockey player

Personal information
- Full name: Damon Laurance Diletti
- Born: 1 May 1971 (age 55) Perth, Western Australia
Medal record
Men's field hockey
Representing Australia
Olympic Games
Silver medal – second place	1992 Barcelona	Team
Bronze medal – third place	1996 Atlanta	Team
Bronze medal – third place	2000 Sydney	Team
Champions Trophy
Gold medal – first place	1999 Brisbane	Team
Commonwealth Games
Gold medal – first place	1998 Kuala Lumpur	Team

Damon Laurance Diletti (born 1 May 1971 in Perth, Western Australia) is a former field hockey goalkeeper from Australia, who competed in three consequentive Summer Olympics for his native country, starting in 1992. At each appearance the electrician won a medal.

Diletti was nicknamed Dingo by his teammates, and was a member of The Kookaburras team for nine years. Apart from three Olympics he participated in two Hockey World Cups and six Champions Trophy tournaments. He resigned after the 2000 Summer Olympics, after playing 133 international matches for Australia. He is the current U14 Boys division 1 coach at the Modernians hockey club.
