= Kim Jung-a =

South Korean field hockey player

Personal information
- Nationality: South Korean
- Born: 1 November 1979 (age 46)

Sport
- Sport: Field hockey

Kim Jung-a (born 1 November 1979) is a South Korean field hockey player. She competed in the women's tournament at the 2004 Summer Olympics, where the South Korean Team placed third in their group, missing out of the semi-finals.
