= Belgian Olympic and Interfederal Committee Order of Merit =

The Belgian Olympic and Interfederal Committee Order of Merit is an annual award created in 2013 and handed out by the Belgian Olympic and Interfederal Committee to a person with an exceptional contribution to the Olympic Movement in Belgium.

== Winners ==
Year<	Winner
2025	Marc Coudron
2024	Tom Goegebuer
2023	Roger Vanmeerbeek
2022	Roger Lespagnard
2021	Kim Gevaert
2020	Anne d’Ieteren
2019	Roger Moens
2018	Guido De Bondt
2017	Hanna Mariën
2016	Ingrid Berghmans
2015	Robert Van de Walle
2014	Patrick Sercu and Gaston Roelants
2013	Eddy Merckx

== See also ==
- Belgian Sportsman of the year
- Belgian Sports Personality of the Year
