= Natalie Fulton =

South African field hockey player

- Born: Natalie Haynes; 17 May 1977 (age 49); Durban, Natal, South Africa
- Spouse: Craig Fulton (m. 2004)
- Children: 3, Milla Fulton; Jake Fulton
- Relatives: Grant Fulton (brother-in-law)
- Field hockey career
- Height: 5 ft 4.5 in (163.8 cm)
- Sport: Field hockey
- Position: Defender/Right Back
Senior career
| Years | Team | Caps | Goals |
| 199x–199x | Western Cape | - | - |
| 2002 | Northern Transvaal | - | - |
| 199x–2005 | Chelmsford | - | - |
| 2005–2010 | Pembroke Wanderers | - | - |
| 2015–2016 | Pembroke Wanderers | - | - |
National team
| Years | Team | Caps | Goals |
| 1997–200x | South Africa | 69 | - |
Coaching career
- 2000–2005: University of Pretoria
- 2007–2010: Pembroke Wanderers
- 2010–: University of Pretoria

Natalie Fulton (born 17 May 1977), also known as Natalie Haynes, is a former South Africa women's field hockey international. She represented South Africa at the 2002 Women's Hockey World Cup and at the 2004 Summer Olympics.

== Early years and education ==
Natalie was educated at Mowat Park High School in Montclair, Durban and at Stellenbosch University.

== Domestic teams ==
=== Chelmsford ===
Natalie played for Chelmsford in the Women's England Hockey League while her partner and future husband, Craig Fulton was a player/coach of the men's team in the Men's England Hockey League. In September 2002, while the couple were in Pretoria, they interrupted a suspected burglar at their home. Craig was hospitalised after he was reportedly stabbed or slashed seven times during the incident.

=== Pembroke Wanderers ===
In 2005 when her husband, Craig Fulton, was appointed director of coaching and player/coach to the senior men's team at Pembroke Wanderers, Natalie began playing for the Wanderers women's team. In 2007, together with Mary Goode, she was a member of the Wanderers women's team that lost 1–0 to Pegasus in the Irish Senior Cup final. She was also a member of the Wanderers women's team that finished as runners up in the 2008 European Cup Winners Cup. Between 2007 and 2010 Fulton was a player/coach of the women's team. After her husband was appointed the coach of the Ireland men's national field hockey team, Fulton re-joined the Wanderers women's team for the 2015–16 Women's Irish Hockey League season.

== South Africa international ==
Fulton represented South Africa at the 2002 Commonwealth Games, the 2002 Women's Hockey World Cup and at the 2004 Summer Olympics. Her husband, Craig Fulton, and her brother-in-law, Grant Fulton, were both South Africa men's field hockey internationals. In 2004 Fulton and her husband became the first married couple to represent South Africa at the same Olympic Games.

| Tournaments | Place |
|---|---|
| 2002 Commonwealth Games | 5th |
| 2002 Women's Hockey World Cup | 13th |
| 2004 Summer Olympics | 9th |

== Coach ==
=== University of Pretoria ===
Fulton has served as club manager at University of Pretoria.

== Personal life ==
Her husband, Craig Fulton, and her brother-in-law, Grant Fulton, were both South Africa men's field hockey internationals. In 2004 Fulton and her husband became the first married couple to represent South Africa at the same Olympic Games.

Her child, Milla, was Ireland indoor hockey player, 2023 Nkosi Cup senior caps, and Ireland U21 in 2025 Junior World Cup. Her child, Jake, were Ireland U21 in 2025 Junior World Cup.

== Honours ==
Pembroke Wanderers

- European Cup Winners Cup
  - Runners Up: 2008: 1
- Irish Senior Cup
  - Runners Up: 2007: 1
