= Mark Hickman =

Australian field hockey player

Personal information
- Full name: Mark Christopher Hickman
- Born: 22 August 1973 (age 52) Darwin, Northern Territory
- Height: 183 cm (6 ft 0 in)
- Weight: 90 kg (198 lb)

Sport
- Sport: Field hockey
Medal record
Men's field hockey
Representing Australia
Olympic Games
Gold medal – first place	2004 Athens	Team
World Cup
Silver medal – second place	2002 Kuala Lumpur	Team
Champions Trophy
Silver medal – second place	2001 Rotterdam	Team
Silver medal – second place	2003 Amstelveen	Team
Bronze medal – third place	1998 Lahore	Team
Commonwealth Games
Gold medal – first place	1998 Kuala Lumpur	Team
Gold medal – first place	2002 Manchester	Team

Mark Christopher Hickman OAM (born 22 August 1973 in Darwin, Northern Territory) is a field hockey goalkeeper from Australia. He was a part of the team that won the gold medal at the 2004 Summer Olympics in Athens, Greece.
