= Stephen Holt (field hockey) =

Australian field hockey player

Personal information
- Full name: Stephen Harris Holt
- Born: 15 September 1974 (age 51) Darwin, Northern Territory
- Height: 196 cm (6 ft 5 in)
- Weight: 91 kg (201 lb)
Medal record
Men's field hockey
Representing Australia
Olympic Games
Bronze medal – third place	2000 Sydney	Team
Champions Trophy
Gold medal – first place	1999 Brisbane	Team
Commonwealth Games
Gold medal – first place	1998 Kuala Lumpur	Team

Stephen Harris Holt (born 15 September 1974 in Darwin, Northern Territory) is a former field hockey defender and midfielder from Australia, who was a member of the team that won the bronze medal at the 2000 Summer Olympics in Sydney.

He was nicknamed Shaggy by his teammates.

He now resides in Yankalilla South Australia where he spends time with his family and competes in the local hockey competition and mentors young aspiring players to follow in his footsteps.
