= John Cadman (sportsman) =

English sportsman (1934–2026)

Personal information
- Born: 27 March 1934 Colchester, Essex, England
- Died: 4 March 2026 (aged 91)
- Height: 180 cm (5 ft 11 in)
- Weight: 75 kg (165 lb)

Sport
- Sport: Field hockey
- Position: Forward
Senior career
Years	Team	Caps	Goals
1957–1958	Canterbury	-	-
1959–1960	Southgate	-	-
1961–1962	Chelmsford	-	-
1963–1968	Saffron Walden	-	-
1968	Bury St Edmunds	-	-
National team
Years	Team	Caps	Goals
–	Great Britain		-
–	England		-

John Cadman
Cricket information
- Batting: Right-handed
- Bowling: Right-arm fast

Domestic team information
- Years: Team
- 1965–1966: Suffolk

Career statistics
Competition	List A
Matches	1
Runs scored	7
Batting average	7.00
100s/50s	–/–
Top score	7
Balls bowled	–
Wickets	–
Bowling average	–
5 wickets in innings	–
10 wickets in match	–
Best bowling	–
Catches/stumpings	–/–
- Source: Cricinfo, 29 July 2011

John Frank Cadman (27 March 1934 – 4 March 2026) was an English cricketer and field hockey player who competed at the 1964 Summer Olympics. Cadman was a right-handed batsman who bowled right-arm fast.

== Biography ==
Cadman was born in Colchester, Essex and educated at Friends' School, Saffron Walden and Loughborough University. Cadman played field hockey for Kent and Essex at county level and at various clubs at club level.

He played for Canterbury Hockey Club, Southgate Hockey Club, Chelmsford Hockey Club and Saffron Walden (the latter because of his teaching job at Friends' School). He introduced hockey to the school in 1960.

Cadman was the Hockey Association national coach and represented both England and Great Britain. He was called up for his England debut against Scotland on 23 April 1960 and represented the Great Britain team at the 1964 Olympic Games in Tokyo.

As a cricketer, Cadman played two Minor Counties Championship matches for Suffolk in 1965, against Norfolk and the Nottinghamshire Second XI. He made his only List A appearance for Suffolk the following season against Kent in the Gillette Cup. In this match, he bowled four wicket-less overs and with the bat he scored seven runs, before being dismissed by Stuart Leary.

Cadman died on 4 March 2026, at the age of 91.
