= Michael York (field hockey) =

Australian field hockey player

Personal information
- Full name: Michael John York
- Born: 16 October 1967 (age 58) Tamworth, New South Wales
- Height: 183 cm (6 ft 0 in)
- Weight: 75 kg (165 lb)
Medal record
Men's field hockey
Representing Australia
Olympic Games
Silver medal – second place	1992 Barcelona	Team
Bronze medal – third place	1996 Atlanta	Team
Bronze medal – third place	2000 Sydney	Team
Champions Trophy
Gold medal – first place	1999 Brisbane	Team
Commonwealth Games
Gold medal – first place	1998 Kuala Lumpur	Team

Michael John York (born 16 October 1967 in Tamworth, New South Wales) is a former field hockey defender from Australia, who participated in four Summer Olympics for his native country, starting in 1988. From 1992 on, at each appearance the skilled veteran won a medal.
