= Guy Fordham =

British field hockey player (born 1975)

Personal information
- Born: 19 July 1975 (age 51) Stockton-on-Tees, England
- Height: 177 cm (5 ft 10 in)
- Weight: 66 kg (146 lb)

Sport
- Sport: Field hockey
Senior career
Years	Team	Caps	Goals
1991–1999	Hounslow	-	-
1999–2009	Guildford	-	-
National team
Years	Team	Caps	Goals
–	GB & England		-
Medal record
Men's field hockey
Representing England
Commonwealth Games
Bronze medal – third place	1998 Kuala Lumpur	Team
European Championship
Bronze medal – third place	1999 Padua	Team
Bronze medal – third place	2003 Barcelona	Team

Guy Tristan Fordham (born 19 July 1975) is a British former field hockey player who competed in the 2000 Summer Olympics and in the 2004 Summer Olympics.

== Biography ==
Fordham played club hockey for Hounslow in the Men's England Hockey League, breaking into the first team at the age of 16. He made his England debut with the club in 1995 and became the club captain.

Still at Hounslow, Fordham represented England and won a bronze medal in the men's hockey, at the 1998 Commonwealth Games in Kuala Lumpur.

Fordham left Hounslow to join Guildford for the 1999/2000 season. It was while at Guildford that Fordham made his two Olympic appearances, first at the 2000 Olympic Games in Sydney and then he represented Great Britain at the 2004 Olympic Games in Athens.
