= Hamdan Hamzah =

Malaysian field hockey player (born 1968)

Personal information
- Nationality: Malaysian
- Born: 2 February 1968 (age 58)

Sport
- Sport: Field hockey

Hamdan Hamzah (born 2 February 1968) is a Malaysian field hockey player. He competed in the men's tournament at the 1996 Summer Olympics.
