= Matthew Hallowes =

South African field hockey player

Medal record

Men's field hockey

Representing South Africa

Africa Cup of Nations
Gold medal – first place	1996 Pretoria	

Matthew Hallowes (born 16 October 1970) is a South African former field hockey player who competed in the 1996 Summer Olympics.
