= Douglas Harris (field hockey) =

Canadian field hockey player (born 1966)

Medal record

Men's field hockey

Representing Canada

Pan American Games
Gold medal – first place	1987 Indianapolis	Team
Silver medal – second place	1991 Havana	Team

Douglas Harris (born 22 March 1966) is a Canadian former field hockey player who competed in the 1988 Summer Olympics. Harris was born in Toronto, Ontario, Canada.

He is currently a professor at the Peter A. Allard School of Law.
