= Rob Edamura =

Canadian field hockey player

Medal record

Men's field hockey

Representing Canada

Pan American Games
Silver medal – second place	1991 Havana	Team
Silver medal – second place	1995 Mar del Plata	Team

Robert "Rob" Edamura (born 30 May 1965) is a Canadian retired field hockey player.

Edamura was born in Toronto, Ontario.

== International competitions ==
- 1991 Pan American Games, Havana (2nd)
- 1995 Pan American Games, Mar del Plata (2nd)
- 1996 Men's Hockey Olympic Qualifier, Barcelona (6th)
- 1996 World Cup Preliminary, Sardinia (2nd)
- 1997 Men's Hockey World Cup Qualifier, Kuala Lumpur (5th)
