= Lachlan Elmer =

Australian field hockey player

Personal information
- Born: 7 June 1969 (age 57)
Medal record
Men's Field Hockey
Representing Australia
Olympic Games
Silver medal – second place	1992 Barcelona	Team competition
Bronze medal – third place	1996 Atlanta	Team competition

Lachlan Antony Elmer (born 7 June 1969 in Melbourne, Victoria) is a former Australian Field Hockey player who participated in two Olympic games.

Elmer was part of the Australia national field hockey team in both the 1992 Olympic Games and the 1996 Olympic Games winning a silver medal in 1992 and a bronze in 1996. He was praised by his teammates for his speed and agility which he showed in several games.

Elmer is the brother of James Elmer, bronze medal winner 2000 Olympics Australia men's hockey team.

Siblings: Cameron Elmer, James Elmer, Jessica Elmer and Dougald Elmer.
