= Marc Coudron =

Sport
- Sport: Field hockey
National team
Years	Team	Caps	Goals
1987-?	Belgium	358	-

Marc Coudron sometimes wrongly written as Marc Caudron is a Belgian former field hockey player and field hockey administrator.

Caudron played 358 matches for the Belgium men's national field hockey team, which was a record at the time. He made his debut in a match against England in 1987. He played at among others the 1994 Men's Hockey World Cup in Sydney and the 2002 Men's Hockey World Cup in Kuala Lumpur.

Coudron was president of the Royal Belgian Hockey Association between 2005 and 2021. In this period the number of Belgian active hockey players has increased from less than 15,000 to more than 53,000 and the number of clubs from 60 to 103. The Belgium men's national field hockey team qualified in this period all four the times for the Summer Olympics, won the silver Olympic medal in 2016 and became European and world champions. The Belgium women's national field hockey team qualified for the 2012 Summer Olympics, finished second and third at European Championships.

Coudron was as of 2016 executive board member of the International Hockey Federation. He was one of the two candidates to become the president of the International Hockey Federation. But he lost with two votes difference to the (at the time) current Indian chairman, Narinder Dhruv Batra. After Batra had to step down by order of the Delhi High Court, Coudron participated in the new elections in November 2022 but lost this time from Tayyab Ikram from Macau.

His father, mother brother and sister played have played field hockey as a member of the national team.

== Honours and awards ==
- Belgian Olympic and Interfederal Committee Order of Merit: 2025
