= Charles David (field hockey) =

Malaysian field hockey player (born 1968)

Personal information
- Nationality: Malaysian
- Born: 7 June 1968 (age 57)

Sport
- Sport: Field hockey

Charles David (born 7 June 1968) is a Malaysian field hockey player. He competed in the men's tournament at the 1996 Summer Olympics.
