= Chelmsford Hockey Club =

English field hockey club

- Nickname(s): Chelm, Greens
- League: Women's England Hockey League East Region Hockey Association
- Home ground: Chelmer Park; Chelmsford, England (Capacity 100 (seated))

Personnel
- Chairman: David Kitchiner
- Website: chelmsfordhc.org.uk
Home	Away

Chelmsford Hockey Club is a field hockey club based in Chelmsford, Essex, England. The club's home ground is at Chelmer Park, with a capacity of 100 seats and numerous standing.

== Club ==
The club has over 450 members and runs seven men's teams and seven women's teams in addition to 2 veterans teams and a range of junior squads. For the 2022/23 season, the Ladies' 1st team will play in the Women's Hockey League Conference East, while the Men's 1st team will be playing in the East Men's Premier Division The remaining men's and ladies' teams play in the East Hockey Leagues.

== History ==
- The Grove Lawn Tennis Club was founded in 1893 in Grove Road. In 1894 the Club moved to a site in Vicarage Road, where "Wellmeads" stands today. At that time the whole of the Moulsham area was yet to be developed and as well as renting the site for tennis courts, in 1898 permission was granted from the tenant, Mr Herbert Marriage, of Moulsham Lodge, for the use of a "field" behind the courts for a newly formed hockey section of the Club. This hockey section soon became independent of the Grove as formal correspondence passed between the respective secretaries. The Club was formed on 26 January 1898.

== Men's Section ==
- 1922/23 - the Club moved to New Writtle Street to share the ground with Chelmsford Cricket Club having played at various venues including Springfield.
- The last committee meeting before war broke out was in the Lion and Lamb on 3 July 1939. Informal games were played during the war years, but the Club was effectively in suspension.
- A Special General meeting was held at the Golden Fleece on 27 August 1946 to "reform" the Club after the end of the war with two Saturday sides being fielded.
- 1956/57 was the first season when a regular Sunday side was recorded in the fixture card.
- In 1962 the pavilion at New Writtle Street was destroyed by the exploits of an arsonist who seems to have destroyed about six other buildings in the location.
- 1964/65 - J G Burrell’s last of twenty-two seasons as President of the Club. This is the longest recorded period for which any member has held the same office in the Club.
- 1968/69 - Creation of the Chelmsford Sports Club (CSC): an affiliation of the Chelmsford Hockey Club, Chelmsford Ladies Hockey Club and the Chelmsford Cricket Club. The CSC led the negotiations with Chelmsford Borough Council for the location of the clubhouse and pitches at new playing fields at Galleywood to be known as Chelmer Park.
- 1971/72 - The first season at Chelmer Park.
- On 21 March 1971 the park and pavilion at Chelmer Park were opened by the Mayor of Chelmsford, Alderman D A Bellamy. The Chelmsford Sports Club clubhouse (our current clubhouse) was erected as part of the pavilion. Roger Thompson, Alan Gemmill and John Currie were the key driving forces in the hockey club for the new ground. The Club’s own official opening was on 23 April 1972 with hockey and cricket games between the three member Clubs followed by various celebrations!
- 1980/81 - A formal Saturday Veterans XI introduced for the first time.
- November 1986 - the launch of our thriving Youth Section!
- 1986/87 - Alan Gemmill’s 40th playing season for Chelmsford.
- 1989/90 - The first season using the artificial pitch at Chelmer Park. This was built as a joint venture by the hockey clubs and Chelmsford Borough Council with the clubs meeting 10% of the capital costs - raising £40,000 in one season! The pitch was opened on 26 November 1989 by the Mayor, Councillor Jean Norton, with an exhibition game which was against Havant HC. In the same season a second Veterans side was started - the "Evergreens". The 1st XI were crowned Norwich Union East League Premier Division Champions...
- 1997/98 - Our Centenary Year.
- oldest M1 goal scorer aged 44 years old: Ian Gall vs Beeston (L3:7)

== Ladies Section ==
Chelmsford Ladies Hockey Club have enjoyed a successful time over the past 100 years, both on and off the field. The founding year of 1898 came about when members of Chelmsford Grove Tennis Club formed a hockey club to extend their leisure to a winter sport. Permission was granted by Mr Herbert Marriage, tenant of Moulsham Lodge, for the use of a field behind the tennis courts in the grounds. An announcement was made in the local press, and ladies and gentlemen were invited to join.

Subscriptions were 2s. 6d. for tennis players and 5s. for non-players. The ladies’ team played midweek, and the men’s and mixed teams at the weekends - and Easter Saturday and Monday. Other grounds used for matches included Widford Lodge and Fingrith Hall - both also homes of Marriage families who had no fewer than twelve ladies playing for Chelmsford in the early 1900s.

In 1900 the Club moved to the large Rectory grounds in New Street, already used by Chelmsford Tennis and Cricket Clubs and for the annual athletic and cycling meetings. This ground extended from the railway line to Rectory Lane. Although travel was often by horse brake, a match report suggests that trains were used for example when the away game against Saffron Walden was played at Bishop’s Stortford. Other opponents from 1900 to 1903 included Bocking, Braintree, Brentwood, Broomfield, Colchester, Maldon and Ipswich.

From a study of match reports in local papers, it would appear that members from many well-known families took park, such as Misses Bodkin, Buttenshaw, Fitch, Martin, Smith, Tregalis, and the three Misses Whitmore. In 1908 the Misses O. and M. Marriage played in the Essex ladies team.

Chelmsford continued to play on the Rectory ground until 1912, when it was sold. The Marconi factory was built on the 10 acres (40,000 m^{2}) of the land, Marconi and Bishops Roads were constructed, and the remainder sold in lots by Messrs. Taylor and Co. A newspaper reported that the cricket club had disbanded, and it is probable that the hockey club had to follow.

In 1911 the Old Girls’ Association of the Chelmsford County High School formed a hockey club, and were given permission to use the school pitch provided "heel-less shoes or galoshes were used". In 1914-15, the Old Girls’ team invited visitors to play for them. The club continued after the war, and was affiliated to Essex in 1920, the year in which Margaret Shanks was tested for the Essex team.

In 1922 the Old Girls’ were unable to use the school pitch owing to building works. It was then resolved to form a ladies club in the town which the Old Girls Club would form a nucleus. A field was used behind Widford Hall, the home of Bessie and Mattie Hodge who were instrumental in forming the club and liaising with the High School Old Girls.

Membership increased and in 1924 the club transferred to Crompton’s Athletic ground, Wood Street, with fixtures for two eleven’s. Captains and officials from 1924 to 1933 included Misses J. Shanks, M. Hodge, D. Britton, N. Shanks, B. Currie, B. Fleming, L. Bradridge, B. Hodge, M. Rowlatt, E. Sayers, N. Christy, R. Shead, E. Boulter, W. Jaggs, C. Currie and C. Cramphorn. Several played in Essex teams.

According to personal accounts, travel would be by bicycle (time was unimportant), pny and trap, motorcycle, car or train. Most often two large cars were used, and after the game players either went to the cinema or to someone’s house for the evening.

In the 1930s the players travelled to Easter festivals at Bournemouth, Ramsgate and Southend. More cars were available, and would meet at the station before away games. Matches continued after the outbreak of World War Two, the last reported in the local press in October, 1940, when Chelmsford opened their season playing Brentwood.

After the war a former member, Vivienne Wiseman, re-formed the club, hiring a council pitch at Admiral’s Park for home matches. A small pavilion provided changing facilities but not much comfort. There were no tea facilities, the club members relying on local cafes. Travel to home matches was still by bicycle, but to go further afield the journey was made on the top of a double decker bus which provided ample opportunity to exchange the week’s news. One or two ran small cars, which were filled to capacity. With three passengers in the front, the middle one did all the gear changing.

The 1960s saw a period of change and expansion. The club moved to Broomfield cricket ground in 1961, where the use of the pavilion for entertaining visitors made a welcome improvement, but an increase in membership led to the return to council pitches at Melbourne Park in 1966. Two teams began playing regularly with fixtures lists that gradually extended into the cricket season in both directions. Trials, tournaments and travel beckoned the keen and adventurous players.

In 1964 two members joined a touring club visiting Lahr, Germany, and since then others have continued the association and enjoyed tours of Berlin and Hamburg, Rhodesia and South Africa, South America and Jamaica. Members have travelled to festivals at Southend and Ramsgate, and the club visited a Rotterdam club at Easter 1967. Several members gained county honours and Pat Donaldson played for England at Wembley, in 1968. The club has received invitations to various tournaments, in and out of Essex, and reciprocated when organising the ladies’ hockey seven-a-side section of the Chelmsford Festival of Sport from 1969.

In 1971 Chelmsford Ladies renewed their association with Chelmsford (Men’s) Hockey and Cricket Clubs by combining to form the Chelmsford Sports Club and by building a joint clubhouse adjacent to council owned premises at Chelmer Park. Situated in the centre of the county, Chelmer Park has become the home of many Essex Ladies activities. The club is well represented on the County Committee, in the County teams and on the officially graded Umpires’ Register. Margaret Lintner, Pru Carter and Jean Pool, Lyn Bollington, Helen Bastian, Claire Liddell, have played for England.

The hockey activities of the 1960s continued and developed in the 1970s with the addition of a third XI to accommodate junior members. The indoor hockey has become increasingly important for training as well as for competitions. All-weather pitches, often floodlit, provided useful surfaces for games when grass was waterlogged. Chelmsford Borough Council and Chelmsford Hockey Clubs raised money in 1989 to build our own astro pitch at Chelmer Park. Tournaments and festivals increased and the Championship Era began.

The All-England Women’s Hockey Association organised a County Championship. In 1972, Essex won the East Anglian Counties’ title, and went on to win the All-England title. The Essex team included seven Chelmsford Ladies players. The championships became leagues in 1989, where Chelmsford remained for four seasons, before being relegated to Division 1, where they remained until promotion back to the Premier Division this year. The All-England Indoor Club Championships have seen Chelmsford in the top four in England since. Mixed hockey has played a part throughout the century, with Chelmsford winning the Colchester Exiles tournament for 6 years running.

As 1979 England outdoor champions, Chelmsford entered the European club competitions. In the preliminary round in Leningrad, they played champion clubs of Germany, France and Russia and qualified for the finals in Barcelona where they me the Welsh, Irish and Dutch winners. This section proved stronger than the other one comprising the Belgians, Scottish, Spanish and German winners. In spite of close matches, Chelmsford finished seventh.

The £4,000 fund-raising year which preceded the European club venture tested the resourcefulness of members and the generosity of friends and well-wishers. Former members responded, and many from the 1920s to the 1970s attended the Club Reunion Day. A club register has now been formed of 359 former members from 1900.

The Youth Section has boomed since the 1984 Olympics, and the World Cup in 1986. Both the Ladies and Men can boast the youth development throughout the past decade, with a number of players rising through the ranks. At the other end of the spectrum, the Vets have also represented the Club at the National level, reaching the Finals in 1994 before winning the national title in 1998 and retaining it in 1999. The 1990s now sees five outdoor teams, four playing league hockey.

== Post Merger ==
At the end of the 1997/98 Centenary Season, the members of Chelmsford Hockey Club and Chelmsford Ladies Hockey Club voted to dissolve their respective clubs. Immediately following these events, the members reconvened and voted to pool their resources to form Chelmsford Hockey Club.

Members of Chelmsford Hockey Club who attended the final AGM and voted to dissolve the Club after a 100-year existence.

Members of Chelmsford Ladies Hockey Club who, like the men, attended their last AGM on the same night.

The inaugural AGM of the new, united Chelmsford Hockey Club.

Pictured seated at the front are the key Management Committee Officers (L-R) Gareth Kemp (Treasurer), Spencer Wilcox (Secretary), Alan Draper (President), Ursula Heelis (Chairman).

- 2000/01 - The Club announce ambitious plans to lay a new water-based artificial pitch, to relay the existing sand-based pitch and to build a new block on the Clubhouse to accommodate dedicated changing facilities, lecture/meeting room, physio treatment rooms and fitness suite.
- 2001/02 - The WaterPitch 2002 fundraising appeal is launched. The target is to raise £200,000 for the new facilities.
- 2003/04 - The construction of the new water-based pitch and changing facilities are completed at the start of the season. The Ladies win the Indoor EHL title for the third time in five years. The Men finish runners-up in EHL Division One and gain promotion to Premier One for the first time in their history. The £1.6 million facilities at Chelmer Park were officially opened on Sunday, 18 April 2004 by the Mayor of Chelmsford, John Hunnable.

== Recent Honours ==
Men's Section

- 1990/1991 - 1st XI are crowned Norwich Union East League Premier Division Champions.
- 1991/1992 - The 1st XI Enter the National Hockey League.
- 1993/1994 - 1st XI are relegated back into the Norwich Union East League Premier Division.
- 1996/1997 - 1st XI are Adnams East League Premier Division Champions, Essex Diamond Hockey County Cup Winners and Essex Indoor Champions, they also gain qualification for the national stages of the club indoor championship and reach the Quarter-finals of the Hockey Association Cup.
- 1997/1998 - Our Centenary Year and back in the NHL!!!
- 1998/1999 - 2nd XI promoted to East Premier B as Champions.
- 1999/2000 - 2nd XI promoted to East Premier A as Champions. 4th XI are promoted to Div 5SE. 6th XI promoted to Div 8SE.
- 2000/2001 - 1st XI finish second in Division One but, agonisingly, lose 7-6 on aggregate to Teddington in a two-leg play-off at Milton Keynes for Premier Division status.
- 2001/2002 - 1st XI goalkeeper David Carter represents England U21 in the Junior World Cup in Tasmania. 5th XI are promoted to Div 7SE. 6th XI are promoted to Div 8SE.
- 2003/2004 - 4th XI are promoted to Div 5SE.
- 2004/2005 - 2nd XI finish 2nd in East Premier A, 3rd XI are promoted to Div 2S, 4th XI are promoted to Div 4SE, 5th XI are promoted to Div 6SE and the 6th XI are promoted to Div 7SE.
- 2006/2007 - The 5th XI are promoted to Div 6SE.
- 2008/2009 - The Indoor side are crowned East Indoor Champions for the first time and inaugural winners of the National Indoor Trophy

Ladies' Section

- 1998/1999 - The Ladies finish as runners-up in EHL Division One but, more importantly, gain promotion back to the Premier Division.
- 1999/2000 - The Ladies win the Indoor EHL title and the right to represent England in Europe in the 2000/01 season
- 2000/2001 - The Ladies retain their Indoor EHL title, but miss out in the play-offs.
- 2001/2002 - Ladies' goalkeeper and captain Katy Roberts gains further recognition with the England Senior squad.
- 2003/2004 - The Ladies win the Indoor EHL title again and win the play-offs to represent England in Europe next season. 2nd XI promoted to East Premier Division.
- 2004/2005 - The Ladies retain their Indoor EHL title, but miss out in the play-offs. In Europe the 1st XI finish third in the European Indoor Club Trophy and a fantastic second in the 15th European Cup Winners Cup. They also finished 3rd in the EHL end of season Super Cup.
- 2005/2006 - The Ladies retain their Indoor EHL title without losing a match, and also triumph over Ipswich and Canterbury in the play-offs.
- 2006/2007 - The 2nd XI won the Essex Indoor Division One title.

Joint Honours

- 2005/2006 - The Mixed XI won the Essex Mixed Division One title. Young rising star Richard Nourse top scoring for the side.

== Notable players ==
=== Men's internationals ===
Extended content

Player	Events/Notes	Ref
(England) John Cadman	1961–1962	
(England) John Cockett	Oly (1952)	
(South Africa) Craig Fulton		

Key

- Oly = Olympic Games
- CG = Commonwealth Games
- WC = World Cup
- CT = Champions Trophy
- EC = European Championships

=== Women's internationals ===
Extended content

Player	Events/Notes	Ref
(South Africa) Natalie Fulton		

Key

- Oly = Olympic Games
- CG = Commonwealth Games
- WC = World Cup
- CT = Champions Trophy
- EC = European Championships
