= Duncan Woods (field hockey) =

British field hockey player

Personal information
- Born: April 1973 (age 53) Cambridge, England

Sport
- Sport: Field hockey
Senior career
Years	Team	Caps	Goals
1992–1993	St Albans	-	-
1994–2002	Southgate	-	-
2007–2008	Chelmsford	-	-
National team
Years	Team	Caps	Goals
–	GB & England	90	-
Medal record
field hockey
Representing England
Commonwealth Games
Bronze medal – third place	1998 Kuala Lumpur	Team

Duncan James Woods (born April 1973) is a male British former field hockey player who represented Great Britain and England.

== Biography ==
Woods was educated at The Leys School and studied at Loughborough University. He played club hockey for Southgate in the Men's England Hockey League.

While at Southgate, he won a bronze medal for England at the 1998 Commonwealth Games in Kuala Lumpur, participated in the 1998 Men's Hockey World Cup and represented England at the 2002 Commonwealth Games in Manchester.

After retiring from international hockey, Woods went into coaching. He was player/coach at Chelmsford and joined Felsted School as a coach in 2007.

Woods was appointed first team coach of Belper in 2012 before moving to Leicester for the 2013/14 season.

He later became a coach at Millfield.
