= Gary Boddington =

South African field hockey player

Medal record

Men's field hockey

Representing South Africa

Africa Cup of Nations
Gold medal – first place	1996 Pretoria	

Gary Boddington (born 1 May 1967) is a South African former field hockey player who competed in the 1996 Summer Olympics.

Boddington spent over 12 years building South Africa-based business intelligence firm Alchemex and managing its eventual acquisition by the Sage Group. Most recently Boddington was EVP and General Manager of the Sage Business Intelligence business unit.

Boddington is the founder & president of Silver Lining Ventures based in Vancouver, British Columbia, Canada. He is also advisor to multiple startups such as Mentio, FreshBI, and VersAccounts.
