= Charles Teversham =

South African field hockey player

Medal record

Men's field hockey

Representing South Africa

Africa Cup of Nations
| Gold medal – first place | 1996 Pretoria | |

Charles Teversham (born 1 May 1968) is a South African former field hockey player who competed in the 1996 Summer Olympics.
