= Allistar Fredericks =

South African field hockey player (1971–2021)

Personal information
- Born: 2 September 1971 Kimberley, South Africa
- Died: 15 June 2021 (aged 49)

Sport
- Sport: Field hockey
Medal record
Representing South Africa
Africa Cup of Nations
Gold medal – first place	1996 Pretoria

Allistar 'Ally' Fredericks (2 September 1971 – 15 June 2021) was a South African former field hockey player who competed in the 1996 Summer Olympics.

Allistar Fredericks Africa Challenge be the first international series for these age groups since 2022 in South African Schools Hockey Association (SASHOC).
