= Stuart Head =

British field hockey player

Personal information
- Born: 1973

Sport
- Sport: Field hockey
Senior career
Years	Team	Caps	Goals
1990–1999	East Grinstead	-	-
1999–2003	Surbiton	-	-
National team
Years	Team	Caps	Goals
–	England & Great Britain		-
Medal record
field hockey
Representing England
Commonwealth Games
Bronze medal – third place	1998 Kuala Lumpur	Team
European Championship
Bronze medal – third place	1999 Padua	Team

Stuart Head AKA Two Flakes Stu (born 1973) is a British former field hockey player.

== Biography ==
Head was educated at Copthorne School in Copthorne, West Sussex, where he was the captain of the hockey club and head boy. He was selected for the England U16 team in 1988.

Head played club hockey for East Grinstead in the Men's England Hockey League and while at the club represented England and won a bronze medal, at the 1998 Commonwealth Games in Kuala Lumpur

He left East Grinstead to join Surbiton for the 1999/2000 season. He was a travelling reserve for the 2000 Summer Olympics.

After a competitive playing career, Head coached field hockey at Epsom College alongside former teammate Michael Johnson.
