= Jordi Arnau =

Spanish field hockey player (born 1970)

Personal information
- Full name: Jorge Jordi Arnau Creus
- Born: 7 April 1970 (age 56) Terrassa, Spain

Sport
- Sport: Field hockey
Senior career
Years	Team	Caps	Goals
–	Atlètic Terrassa	-	-
National team
Years	Team	Caps	Goals
–	Spain		-
Medal record
Men's field hockey
Representing Spain
Olympic Games
Silver medal – second place	1996 Atlanta	Team
World Cup
Silver medal – second place	1998 Utrecht	Team
Champions Trophy
Bronze medal – third place	1997 Adelaide	Team

Jorge Jordi Arnau Creus (born 7 April 1970 in Terrassa, Catalonia) is a former field hockey player from Spain who won the silver medal with the men's national team at the 1996 Summer Olympics in Atlanta, Georgia.
