= Grant Fulton =

South African field hockey player

- Born: 21 June 1973 (age 53); Harare, Zimbabwe
- Spouse: Meghan Fulton (m. 2011)
- Children: 2
- Relatives: Craig Fulton (brother); Natalie Fulton (sister-in-law)
- Field hockey career
- Sport: Field hockey
National team
Years	Team	Caps	Goals
?	South Africa	60	-
Coaching career
- Years: Team
- 2005–: North Carolina Tar Heels (Assistant)
Medal record
Representing South Africa
Africa Cup of Nations
Gold medal – first place	1996 Pretoria

William Grant Fulton (born 21 June 1973) is a South African former field hockey player who competed in the 1996 Summer Olympics.
