= Juantxo García-Mauriño =

Spanish field hockey player (born 1964)

Personal information
- Born: 11 March 1964 (age 62) Barcelona, Spain
Medal record
Men's field hockey
Representing Spain
Olympic Games
Silver medal – second place	1996 Atlanta	Team competition

Juan "Juantxo" de Dios García-Mauriño Sanchís (born 11 March 1964 in Barcelona) is a former field hockey player from Spain. He won the silver medal with the men's national team at the 1996 Summer Olympics in Atlanta, Georgia.

He is an architect and writer, and has published a series of articles in local journals about sports.
