= Lailin Abu Hassan =

Malaysian field hockey player (born 1970)

Personal information
- Nationality: Malaysian
- Born: 16 January 1970 (age 56)

Sport
- Sport: Field hockey

Lailin Abu Hassan (born 16 January 1970) is a Malaysian field hockey player. He competed in the 1992 and 1996 Summer Olympics.
