= Jamaluddin Roslan =

Malaysian field hockey player (born 1978)

Personal information
- Nationality: Malaysian
- Born: 18 December 1978 (age 47)

Sport
- Sport: Field hockey
Medal record
Men's field hockey
Representing Malaysia
Asian Games
Silver medal – second place	2010 Guangzhou	Team
Bronze medal – third place	2002 Busan	Team

Jamaluddin Roslan (born 18 December 1978) is a Malaysian field hockey player. He competed in the men's tournament at the 2000 Summer Olympics.
