= Chris Gifford (field hockey) =

Canadian field hockey player

Personal information
- Born: March 20, 1966 (age 60) Vancouver, British Columbia
Medal record
Men's field hockey
Representing Canada
Pan American Games
Gold medal – first place	1987 Indianapolis	Team
Silver medal – second place	1991 Havana	Team
Silver medal – second place	1995 Mar del Plata	Team
Gold medal – first place	1999 Winnipeg	Team

Christopher Gifford (born March 20, 1966, in Vancouver, British Columbia) is a former field hockey striker from Canada, who currently is working in management. Married in August 1998 to his wife Sandra, he now has three children.

== International senior competitions ==
- 1987 – Pan American Games, Indianapolis (1st)
- 1988 – Olympic Games, Seoul (11th)
- 1989 – Intercontinental Cup, Madison, US (2nd)
- 1990 – World Cup, Lahore (11th)
- 1991 – Pan American Games, Havana (2nd)
- 1993 – Intercontinental Cup, Poznan (7th)
- 1995 – Pan American Games, Mar del Plata (2nd)
- 1996 – Olympic Qualifier, Barcelona (6th)
- 1996 – World Cup Preliminary, Sardinia (2nd)
- 1997 – World Cup Qualifier, Kuala Lumpur (5th)
- 1998 – World Cup, Utrecht (8th)
- 1999 – Pan American Games, Winnipeg (1st)
- 2000 – Sultan Azlan Shah Cup, Kuala Lumpur (7th)
- 2000 – Americas Cup, Cuba (2nd)
- 2000 – Olympic Games, Sydney (10th)
