= Nick Butcher =

American field hockey player

Nicholas Butcher (born May 7, 1976 in Los Angeles) is an American former field hockey player who competed in the 1996 Summer Olympics.
