= Jorge Querejeta =

Argentine field hockey player

Personal information
- Full name: Jorge M. Querejeta Capella
- Born: 1 September 1968 (age 57)

Sport
- Sport: Field hockey
Medal record
Men's field hockey
Representing Argentina
Pan American Games
Gold medal – first place	1995 Mar del Plata	Team

Jorge Querejeta Capella (born September 1, 1968) is a former field hockey player from Argentina. He competed for his native country at the 1996 Summer Olympics, where he finished in ninth place with the national squad. He won the gold medal at the 1995 Pan American Games.
