= Aphthar Singh Piara =

Malaysian field hockey player (born 1973)

Personal information
- Nationality: Malaysian
- Born: 19 July 1973 (age 52)

Sport
- Sport: Field hockey

Aphthar Singh Piara (born 19 July 1973) is a Malaysian field hockey player. He competed in the men's tournament at the 1996 Summer Olympics.
