= Gavin Ferreira =

Indian field hockey player

Gavin Ferreira is a former international field hockey player who resides in Orlem, Malad. He is an alumnus of St Anne's High School, Orlem and St Xavier's College, Mumbai.

He has represented India in various field hockey tournaments internationally including the 1996 Summer Olympics in Atlanta, Georgia where he was one of the highest goal scorers for the Indian hockey team.

He has represented India 118 times in International field hockey tournaments across the world and has scored 39 field goals.

Because of his various achievements in domestic and international hockey, Gavin is a part of the hall of fame of the Mumbai Hockey Association.

In 2007 Gavin coached the Indian hockey team in a miniaturised version of the game. This was a six-a-side hockey competition that was a part of the Asian Indoor and Martial Arts Games held in Macau, China from 26 October – 3 November 2007.

Gavin was an assistant coach to the Delhi Wizards hockey team for the 2012 World Series Hockey held in India in 2012.

Gavin initially played club hockey for and then coached Air India before the airline ceased its hockey interest.

In 2015, Gavin organised a franchised based Rink Hockey tournament called the Mumbai Rink Hockey League (MRHL) at Malad Gymkhana. The tournament ran from 1–5 December 2015. It was won by the Poisar Pirates and was hailed as success in the media.

In recent years, Gavin was heavily involved in hockey development in Odisha sponsored by the Government of Odisha and is now currently the Chief Advisor to the Bihar State Sports Authority (BSSA) and Head Coach of BSSA’s hockey academy.
