= Paul Lewis (field hockey) =

Australian field hockey player

Personal information
- Born: 1 November 1966 (age 59)
Medal record
Men's field hockey
Representing Australia
Olympic Games
Silver medal – second place	1992 Barcelona	Team competition
Bronze medal – third place	1996 Atlanta	Team competition

Paul Snowden Lewis (born 1 November 1966 in Adelaide, Australia) is a former field hockey midfield player from Australia, a member of the Men's National Hockey Team. He twice won a medal at the Summer Olympics.

In his youth, Paul played for Forestville Hockey Club in South Australia, and attended Unley High School. He would later earn a Bachelor of Laws upon retiring from international hockey, and is now a prominent lawyer in Perth, Australia.

He is the only South Australian male, and one of only 19 males overall to have played over 200 international games for Australia.

The perpetual shield for Hockey SA's U18 Men's State Junior Zone Championship is named after Paul.
