= Shankar Ramu =

Malaysian field hockey player (born 1970)

Personal information
- Nationality: Malaysian
- Born: 16 June 1970 (age 56)

Sport
- Sport: Field hockey
Medal record
Men's field hockey
Representing Malaysia
Asian Games
Bronze medal – third place	1990 Beijing	Team
Commonwealth Games
Silver medal – second place	1998 Kuala Lumpur	Team

Shankar Ramu (born 16 June 1970) is a Malaysian field hockey player. He competed at the 1992 Summer Olympics and the 1996 Summer Olympics.
