= Murray Anderson (field hockey) =

South African field hockey player

Medal record

Men's field hockey

Representing South Africa

Africa Cup of Nations
Gold medal – first place	1996 Pretoria	

Murray Anderson (born 17 September 1968) is a former field hockey player who competed in the 1996 Summer Olympics.
