= Nor Saiful Zaini Nasir-ud-Din =

Malaysian field hockey player (born 1966)

Personal information
- Nationality: Malaysian
- Born: 27 March 1966 (age 60)

Sport
- Sport: Field hockey
Medal record
Men's field hockey
Representing Malaysia
Asian Games
Bronze medal – third place	1990 Beijing	Team
Commonwealth Games
Silver medal – second place	1998 Kuala Lumpur	Team

Nor Saiful Zaini Nasir-ud-Din (born 27 March 1966) is a Malaysian field hockey player. He competed at the 1992 Summer Olympics, the 1996 Summer Olympics and the 2000 Summer Olympics.
