= Hockey at the Commonwealth Games =

- Most recent season or competition: Hockey at the 2022 Commonwealth Games
- Sport: Field hockey
- Founded: 1998; 28 years ago
- First season: 1998
- No. of teams: 10
- Most recent champions: M: Australia (7th title); W: England (1st title)
- Most titles: M: Australia (7 titles); W: Australia (4 titles)

Hockey (also known as field hockey) is one of the sports at the quadrennial Commonwealth Games competition. It has been a Commonwealth Games sport since 1998. Hockey was a core sport and was included in the sporting program of each edition of the Games from 1998 but was omitted in 2026.

== Editions ==
Games	Year	Host city	Venue
XVI	1998	Kuala Lumpur, Malaysia	Malaysia National Hockey Stadium
XVII	2002	Manchester, England	Belle Vue Leisure Centre
XVIII	2006	Melbourne, Australia	State Netball and Hockey Centre
XIX	2010	New Delhi, India	Major Dhyan Chand National Stadium
XX	2014	Glasgow, Scotland	Glasgow National Hockey Centre
XXI	2018	Gold Coast, Australia	Gold Coast Hockey Centre
XXII	2022	Birmingham, England	University of Birmingham

== Men's tournament ==
=== Results ===
Year	Host	Gold medal match			Bronze medal match			Number of teams
Year	Host	Gold medal	Score	Silver medal	Bronze medal	Score	Fourth place	Number of teams
1998; Details	Kuala Lumpur, Malaysia	Australia	4–0	Malaysia	England	1–1 (a.e.t.) (4–2 p.s.)	India	11
2002; Details	Manchester, England	Australia	5–2	New Zealand	Pakistan	10–2	South Africa	8
2006; Details	Melbourne, Australia	Australia	3–0	Pakistan	Malaysia	2–0	England	10
2010; Details	Delhi, India	Australia	8–0	India	New Zealand	3–3 (a.e.t.) (5–3 p.s.)	England	10
2014; Details	Glasgow, Scotland	Australia	4–0	India	England	3–3 (4–2 p.s.o.)	New Zealand	10
2018; Details	Gold Coast, Australia	Australia	2–0	New Zealand	England	2–1	India	10
2022; Details	Birmingham, England	Australia	7–0	India	England	6–3	South Africa	10

=== Summary ===
Team	Gold medal	Silver medal	Bronze medal	Fourth place
Australia	7 (1998, 2002, 2006*, 2010, 2014, 2018*, 2022)			
India		3 (2010*, 2014, 2022)		2 (1998, 2018)
New Zealand		2 (2002, 2018)	1 (2010)	1 (2014)
Malaysia		1 (1998*)	1 (2006)	
Pakistan		1 (2006)	1 (2002)	
England			4 (1998, 2014, 2018, 2022*)	2 (2006, 2010)
South Africa				2 (2002, 2022)

* = host nation

=== Team appearances ===
Team	(Malaysia) 1998	(England) 2002	(Australia) 2006	(India) 2010	(Scotland) 2014	(Australia) 2018	(England) 2022	Total
Australia	1st	1st	1st	1st	1st	1st	1st	7
Barbados	–	8th	–	–	–	–	–	1
Canada	7th	6th	9th	7th	6th	8th	8th	7
England	3rd	5th	4th	4th	3rd	3rd	3rd	7
Ghana	–	–	–	–	–	–	10th	1
India	4th	–	6th	2nd	2nd	4th	2nd	6
Kenya	10th	–	–	–	–	–	–	1
Malaysia	2nd	–	3rd	8th	7th	5th	WD	5
New Zealand	6th	2nd	5th	3rd	4th	2nd	5th	7
Pakistan	8th	3rd	2nd	6th	–	7th	7th	6
Scotland	–	–	7th	9th	8th	6th	9th	5
South Africa	5th	4th	8th	5th	5th	10th	4th	7
Trinidad and Tobago	11th	–	10th	10th	10th	–	–	4
Wales	9th	7th	–	–	9th	9th	6th	5
Total	11	8	10	10	10	10	10	

== Women's tournament ==
=== Results ===
Year	Host	Gold medal match			Bronze medal match			Number of teams
Year	Host	Gold medal	Score	Silver medal	Bronze medal	Score	Fourth place	Number of teams
1998; Details	Kuala Lumpur, Malaysia	Australia	8–1	England	New Zealand	3–0	India	12
2002; Details	Manchester, England	India	3–2 (a.e.t.)	England	Australia	4–3	New Zealand	8
2006; Details	Melbourne, Australia	Australia	1–0	India	England	0–0 (a.e.t.) (3–1 p.s.)	New Zealand	10
2010; Details	Delhi, India	Australia	2–2 (a.e.t.) (4–2 p.s.)	New Zealand	England	1–0	South Africa	10
2014; Details	Glasgow, Scotland	Australia	1–1 (3–1 p.s.o.)	England	New Zealand	5–2	South Africa	10
2018; Details	Gold Coast, Australia	New Zealand	4–1	Australia	England	6–0	India	10
2022; Details	Birmingham, England	England	2–1	Australia	India	1–1 (2–1 s.o.)	New Zealand	10

=== Summary ===
Team	Gold medal	Silver medal	Bronze medal	Fourth place
Australia	4 (1998, 2006*, 2010, 2014)	2 (2018*, 2022)	1 (2002)	
England	1 (2022*)	3 (1998, 2002*, 2014)	3 (2006, 2010, 2018)	
New Zealand	1 (2018)	1 (2010)	2 (1998, 2014)	3 (2002, 2006, 2022)
India	1 (2002)	1 (2006)	1 (2022)	2 (1998, 2018)
South Africa				2 (2010, 2014)

* = host nation

=== Team appearances ===
Team	(Malaysia) 1998	(England) 2002	(Australia) 2006	(India) 2010	(Scotland) 2014	(Australia) 2018	(England) 2022	Total
Australia	1st	3rd	1st	1st	1st	2nd	2nd	7
Barbados	–	–	9th	–	–	–	–	1
Canada	10th	7th	7th	6th	8th	5th	5th	7
England	2nd	2nd	3rd	3rd	2nd	3rd	1st	7
Ghana	–	–	–	–	–	10th	10th	2
India	4th	1st	2nd	5th	5th	4th	3rd	7
Jamaica	8th	–	–	–	–	–	–	1
Malaysia	6th	8th	5th	10th	7th	8th	-	6
Kenya	–	–	–	–	–	–	9th	1
Namibia	12th	–	–	–	–	–	–	1
Nigeria	–	–	10th	–	–	–	–	1
New Zealand	3rd	4th	4th	2nd	3rd	1st	4th	7
South Africa	9th	5th	8th	4th	4th	6th	7th	7
Scotland	5th	6th	6th	7th	6th	7th	6th	7
Trinidad and Tobago	7th	–	–	9th	10th	–	–	3
Wales	11th	–	–	8th	9th	9th	8th	5
Total	12	8	10	10	10	10	10	

== Medal table ==
=== Total ===
Rank	Nation	Gold	Silver	Bronze	Total
1	Australia	11	2	1	14
2	India	1	4	1	6
3	England	1	3	7	11
4	New Zealand	1	3	3	7
5	Malaysia	0	1	1	2
5	Pakistan	0	1	1	2
Totals (6 entries)		14	14	14	42

=== Men ===
Rank	Nation	Gold	Silver	Bronze	Total
1	Australia	7	0	0	7
2	India	0	3	0	3
3	New Zealand	0	2	1	3
4	Malaysia	0	1	1	2
4	Pakistan	0	1	1	2
6	England	0	0	4	4
Totals (6 entries)		7	7	7	21

=== Women ===
Rank	Nation	Gold	Silver	Bronze	Total
1	Australia	4	2	1	7
2	England	1	3	3	7
3	New Zealand	1	1	2	4
4	India	1	1	1	3
Totals (4 entries)		7	7	7	21
