= List of Asian Games medalists in field hockey =

This is the complete list of Asian Games medalists in field hockey from 1958 to 2022.

== Men ==
Games	Gold	Silver	Bronze
1958 Tokyo	Pakistan (PAK); Hafeez Ahmed; Noor Alam; Qazi Massarrat Hussain; Khursheed Aslam; Manzoor Bajwa; Naseer Bunda; Munir Dar; Abdul Hamid; Zakir Hussain; Anwar Ahmed Khan; Motiullah Khan; Habib Ali Kiddie; Muhammad Afzal Manna; Chaudhry Ghulam Rasool; Habibur-Rehman; Latif-ur Rehman; Qazi Abdul Waheed; Khwaja Zakauddin	India (IND); A. W. Caleb; N. R. Chavan; Leslie Claudius; Chinadorai Deshmutu; Balbir Singh Dosanjh; Gurjit Singh Kullar; Shankar Lakshman; Mohammed Yakub Qureshi; D. P. Rathi; Bakshish Singh; Balbir Singh; Balkrishan Singh; Gurdev Singh; Gursevak Singh; Jagjit Singh; Udham Singh	South Korea (KOR); Ahn Jae-sung; Baek Ki-young; Bu Dae-hyun; Hong In-ho; Kim Chu-gil; Kim Jae-eui; Kim Sang-jong; Kim Sang-taek; Kim Si-sup; Kim Soo-il; Kim Yeon-bong; Kwon Oh-wan; Lee Gul; Lee Jung-soo; Park Chun-saeng; Park Sang-ho; Yang Geum-dong
1962 Jakarta	Pakistan (PAK); Bashir Ahmed; Noor Alam; Manzoor Hussain Atif; Tariq Aziz; Naseer Bunda; Munir Dar; Zafar Hayat; Mazhar Hussain; Zakir Hussain; Anwar Ahmed Khan; Motiullah Khan; Habib Ali Kiddie; Muhammad Asad Malik; Hayat Muhammad; Tariq Niazi; Chaudhry Ghulam Rasool; Abdul Waheed; Khwaja Zakauddin	India (IND); Joseph Antic; Erman Bastian; Rajendran Christie; V. Deshmukh; Abdul Hamid; Shankar Lakshman; Hiranna M. Nimal; Bandu Patil; Jaman Lal Sharma; Charanjit Singh; Darshan Singh; Gurdev Singh; Gurmit Singh; Joginder Singh; Madan Mohan Singh; Piara Singh; Prithipal Singh	Malaya (MAL); Ismail Ali; Kandiah Anandarajah; Michael Arulraj; Chua Eng Wah; Ho Koh Chye; Robin Jayesuria; Doraisamy Munusamy; Chelliah Paramalingam; Arumugam Sabapathy; Aboo Samah; Manikam Shanmuganathan; Mike Shepherdson; Mani Sockalingam; Mohd Hariff Taib; Lawrence Van Huizen; Rajaratnam Yogeswaran
1966 Bangkok	India (IND); A. L. Frank; Balbir Singh Grewal; Haripal Kaushik; Balbir Singh Kular; Balbir Singh Kullar; Mohinder Lal; Shankar Lakshman; John Peter; Dharam Singh; Gurbux Singh; Harbinder Singh; Harmik Singh; Inder Singh; Jagdeep Singh; Jagjit Singh; Prithipal Singh; Tarsem Singh; Noel Toppo	Pakistan (PAK); Muhammad Ashfaq; Laeeq Ahmed; Muhammad Akhtar; Saeed Anwar; Tariq Aziz; Khizer Nawaz Bajwa; Jahangir Butt; Munir Dar; Abdul Hamid; Jahangir Khan; Khalid Mahmood; Muhammad Asad Malik; Riaz-ud-Din; Tariq Niazi; Fazal-ur-Rehman; Abdul Rashid; Abdul Waheed; Khwaja Zakauddin	Japan (JPN); Hiroshi Fujishima; Seiji Hashimoto; Yukitoshi Hata; Nobuo Ide; Yukio Kamimura; Shigeo Kaoku; Akio Kudo; Norihiko Matsumoto; Shozo Nishimura; Satokazu Otsuka; Katsumi Shirato; Takashi Sugiura; Hiroyuki Takagi; Akio Takashima; Akihito Wada; Minoru Yoshimura; Katsuhiro Yuzaki; Tsuneya Yuzaki
1970 Bangkok	Pakistan (PAK); Ashfaq Ahmed; Riaz Ahmed; Gulraiz Akhtar; Saeed Anwar; Muhammed Aslam Arayin; Jahangir Butt; Tanvir Dar; Akhtar-ul-Islam; Sami Khan; Khalid Mahmood; Muhammad Asad Malik; Riaz-ud-Din; Abdul Rashid; Fazal-ur-Rehman; Shahnaz Sheikh; Zahid Sheikh; Saleem Sherwani; Islahuddin Siddique	India (IND); Charles Cornelius; M. P. Ganesh; B. P. Govinda; Balbir Singh Grewal; Ashok Kumar; Vinod Kumar; Cedric Pereira; Krishnamurthy Perumal; Ajit Pal Singh; Baldev Singh; Harbinder Singh; Harcharan Singh; Harmik Singh; Kulwant Singh; Major Singh; Mukhbain Singh; Mohinder Singh; Uthiah	Japan (JPN); Saburo Amemiya; Susumu Chiba; Masaji Fuji; Shunji Furuta; Toshiaki Ichinose; Kazuo Kawamura; Kyoichi Nagaya; Hideji Okabe; Satokazu Otsuka; Haruo Satake; Norio Takahashi; Michinori Ueda; Akihito Wada
1974 Tehran	Pakistan (PAK); Muhammad Azam; Arshad Chaudhry; Manzoor-ul Hassan; Shamim Ilyas; Muhammad Saeed Khan; Samiullah Khan; Arshad Mahmood; Saleem Nazim; Qayyum Niazi; Abdul Rashid; Akhtar Rasool; Shahnaz Sheikh; Zahid Sheikh; Saleem Sherwani; Islahuddin Siddique; Iftikhar Syed; Hidayat Ullah; Munawwaruz Zaman	India (IND); Vasudevan Baskaran; John Correia; Leslie Fernandez; M. P. Ganesh; B. P. Govinda; Aslam Sher Khan; Mehboob Khan; Ashok Kumar; K. N. Kusha; Victor Philips; Surjit Singh Randhawa; Ajit Singh; Ajit Pal Singh; Baldev Singh; Chand Singh; Harcharan Singh; Harmik Singh; Varinder Singh	Malaysia (MAL); K. Balasingam; Murugesan Mahendran; Mohd Anwar Nor; Len Oliveiro; Ow Soon Kooi; Nallasamy Padanisamy; Ramalingam Pathmarajah; Poon Fook Loke; K. T. Rajan; Rengasamy Ramakrishnan; Sri Shanmuganathan; Savinder Singh; Brian Santa Maria; Wong Choon Hin; Azaari Zain; Khairuddin Zainal
1978 Bangkok	Pakistan (PAK); Munir Bhatti; Rana Ehsanullah; Manzoor-ul Hassan; Manzoor Hussain; Hanif Khan; Muhammad Saeed Khan; Saeed Ahmed Khan; Samiullah Khan; Nasim Mirza; Akhtar Rasool; Muhammad Shafiq; Shahnaz Sheikh; Saleem Sherwani; Islahuddin Siddique; Munawwaruz Zaman; Qamar Zia	India (IND); Salim Abbasi; Vasudevan Baskaran; Pramod Batlaw; Sylvanus Dung Dung; Mervyn Fernandis; Olympio Fernandes; B. P. Govinda; Sukhbir Singh Grewal; Zafar Iqbal; Ashok Kumar; Victor Philips; Surjit Singh Randhawa; Allan Schofield; Ranbir Singh; Varinder Singh; Surinder Singh Sodhi	Malaysia (MAL); Sayuti Abdul Samat; K. Balasingam; Foo Keat Seong; Avtar Singh Gill; Updesh Singh Gill; Awtar Singh Grewal; Razak Leman; Len Oliveiro; K. T. Rajan; Rengasamy Ramakrishnan; V. Ravindran; Mohinder Singh; Savinder Singh; Tam Chew Seng; Tam Kum Seng; Azaari Zain
1982 New Delhi	Pakistan (PAK); Ishtiaq Ahmed; Mushtaq Ahmad; Saeed Ahmed; Nasir Ali; Manzoor-ul Hassan; Rashid-ul-Hassan; Manzoor Hussain; Hanif Khan; Kaleemullah Khan; Muhammad Saeed Khan; Samiullah Khan; Shahid Ali Khan; Muhammad Rashid; Hassan Sardar; Qamar Zia; Qasim Zia	India (IND); Syed Ali; J. M. Carvalho; Rajinder Singh Chauhan; Mervyn Fernandis; Jagdeep Singh Gill; Marcellus Gomes; Zafar Iqbal; Romeo James; Charanjit Kumar; Mir Ranjan Negi; Mohammed Shahid; Vineet Kumar Sharma; Gurmail Singh; Rajinder Singh; M. M. Somaya; Manohar Topno	Malaysia (MAL); Zulkifli Abbas; Abdul Rahim Ahmad; Fidelis Anthony; Jagjit Singh Chet; Michael Chew; Foo Keat Seong; Soon Mustapha; Kevin Nunis; Sarjit Singh; Colin Santa Maria; Shurentheran Murugesan; Tam Chew Seng; Wallace Tan; Stephen Van Huizen; Mohamed Yazid; Ahmed Fadzil
1986 Seoul	South Korea (KOR); An Jong-rae; Jeong Bu-jin; Jeong Gye-seok; Han Jin-su; Han Jong-yeol; Huh Sang-young; Ji Jae-gwan; Kim Jong-gap; Kim Man-hoe; Kim Young-joon; Kwon Sun-pil; Mo Ji-yeong; Nam Kung-ok; Sin Seok-gyun; Song Seok-chan; Yu Seung-jin	Pakistan (PAK); Ishtiaq Ahmed; Mansoor Ahmed; Shahbaz Ahmed; Ziauddin Ahmed; Nasir Ali; Wasim Feroz; Rashid-ul-Hassan; Shahidul Islam; Farhat Hassan Khan; Kaleemullah Khan; Ayaz Mahmood; Qazi Mohib; Syed Ghulam Moinuddin; Iftikhar Riaz; Saleem Sherwani; Qasim Zia	India (IND); Abdul Aziz; Jagdeep Singh Gill; Rajinder Singh Rawat; Mohammed Shahid; Vineet Kumar Sharma; Balwinder Singh; Hardeep Singh; Jagbir Singh; Mohinder Pal Singh; Neel Kamal Singh; Pargat Singh; Ram Prakash Singh; Thoiba Singh; Tikken Singh; M. M. Somaya; B. K. Subramani
1990 Beijing	Pakistan (PAK); Mansoor Ahmed; Shahbaz Ahmed; Rana Mujahid Ali; Khalid Bashir; Wasim Feroz; Musaddiq Hussain; Muhammad Qamar Ibrahim; Muhammad Irfan; Khawaja Junaid; Shahid Ali Khan; Farhat Hassan Khan; Qazi Mohib; Muhammad Riasat; Anjum Saeed; Zahid Shareef; Tahir Zaman	India (IND); Shakeel Ahmed; Mohammed Ali; Darryl D'Souza; John Fernandes; Mark Patterson; Dhanraj Pillay; Jude Felix Sebastian; Gundeep Singh; Harendra Singh; Jagbir Singh; Jagdev Singh; Pargat Singh; Ram Prakash Singh; Thoiba Singh; Vivek Singh; A. B. Subbaiah	Malaysia (MAL); Mohd Abdul Hadi; Charles David Aitken; Enbaraj Kanniah; Gary Fidelis; Kamarudzaman; Lim Chiow Chuan; Soon Mustapha; Mirnawan Nawawi; Shankar Ramu; Sarjit Singh; Brian Jayhan Siva; Sivabalan Selvadurai; Ahmad Suffian; Tai Beng Hai; Nor Saiful Zaini; Ahmed Fadzil
1994 Hiroshima	South Korea (KOR); Cho Myung-jun; Choi Jung-ho; Han Byeong-guk; Jeon Jong-ha; Jeong Yong-gyun; Kang Keon-wook; Kim Jong-i; Kim Yoon; Kim Yeong-gwi; Gu Jin-su; Lee Jung-suk; Park Sin-heung; Sin Seok-gyo; Yoo Moon-ki; Yu Seung-jin; Yu Myeong-gun	India (IND); Shakeel Ahmed; Anil Alexander Aldrin; Mohammed Arif; Ashish Ballal; Baljit Singh Dhillon; Devinder Kumar; Mukesh Kumar; Sanjeev Kumar; Rajnish Mishra; Ravi Nayakar; Dhanraj Pillay; Mohammed Riaz; Jude Felix Sebastian; Harpreet Singh; A. B. Subbaiah; Sabu Varkey	Pakistan (PAK); Asif Ahmed; Mansoor Ahmed; Shahbaz Ahmed; Kamran Ashraf; Ahmed Alam; Naveed Alam; Faisal Ali; Asif Bajwa; Khawaja Junaid; Muhammad Danish Kaleem; Rahim Khan; Irfan Mahmood; Shafqat Malik; Muhammad Shahbaz; Muhammad Usman; Tahir Zaman
1998 Bangkok	India (IND); Anil Alexander Aldrin; Ashish Ballal; Lazarus Barla; Sameer Dad; Baljit Singh Dhillon; Mukesh Kumar; Dhanraj Pillay; L. Prabhakaran; Mohammed Riaz; Baljit Singh Saini; Ramandeep Singh; Sandeep Somesh; A. B. Subbaiah; Dilip Tirkey; Thirumal Valavan; Sabu Varkey	South Korea (KOR); Cho Myung-jun; Han Byeong-guk; Hong Gyeong-seop; Jeong Yong-gyun; Jung Jin-dong; Kang Keon-wook; Kim Jung-chul; Kim Yong-bae; Kim Yeong-gwi; Ko Dong-sik; Gu Jin-su; Lim Jung-woo; Park Sin-heung; Song Seung-tae; Yeo Woon-kon; Yoo Moon-ki	Pakistan (PAK); Sohail Abbas; Babar Abdullah; Anis Ahmed; Waseem Ahmed; Ahmed Alam; Atif Bashir; Haider Hussain; Tariq Imran; Naveed Iqbal; Muhammad Nadeem; Muhammad Qasim; Asad Qureshi; Amir Salim; Muhammad Sarwar; Imran Yousuf; Irfan Yousaf
2002 Busan	South Korea (KOR); Kang Keon-wook; Sin Seok-gyo; Jeon Jong-ha; Kim Yong-bae; Ji Seung-hwan; Hwang Jong-hyun; Kim Jung-chul; Lim Jong-chun; Kim Kyung-seok; Kim Yoon; Yeo Woon-kon; Kang Seong-jung; Song Seung-tae; Kim Chul; Seo Jong-ho; Lee Nam-yong	India (IND); Devesh Chauhan; Bharat Chettri; Dilip Tirkey; Jugraj Singh; Kamalpreet Singh; Dinesh Nayak; Viren Rasquinha; Vikram Pillay; Ignace Tirkey; Bimal Lakra; Dhanraj Pillay; Deepak Thakur; Prabhjot Singh; Daljit Singh Dhillon; Gagan Ajit Singh; Tejbir Singh	Malaysia (MAS); Chairil Anwar Abdul Aziz; Shaiful Azli; Chua Boon Huat; Jamaluddin Roslan; Keevan Raj Kali; Krishnamurthy Gobinathan; Rodzhanizam Mat Radzi; Megat Azrafiq Termizi; Azlan Misron; Madzli Ikmar; Redzuan Ponirin; Mohd Amin Rahim; Norazlan Rahim; Mohd Fairuz Ramli; Kuhan Shanmuganathan; Kumar Subramaniam
2006 Doha	South Korea (KOR); Ko Dong-sik; Lee Seung-il; Kim Chul; Kim Yong-bae; Lee Nam-yong; Seo Jong-ho; Kang Seong-jung; Yoon Sung-hoon; You Hyo-sik; Yeo Chang-yong; Cha Jong-bok; Lee Myung-ho; Hong Eun-seong; Hong Sung-kweon; Yeo Woon-kon; Jang Jong-hyun	China (CHN); Luo Fangming; Ye Peng; Jiang Xishang; Lu Fenghui; Li Wei; Song Yi; Meng Xuguang; Liu Xiantang; Hu Liang; Meng Jun; Yu Yang; Na Yubo; Pei Zuopeng; Su Rifeng; Hu Huiren	Pakistan (PAK); Salman Akbar; Zeeshan Ashraf; Ihsanullah Khan; Imran Khan Yousafzai; Adnan Maqsood; Sajjad Anwar; Tariq Aziz; Rashid Imran; Shakeel Abbasi; Rehan Butt; Muhammad Zubair; Nasir Ahmed; Imran Ali Warsi; Muhammad Imran; Muhammad Waqas; Muhammad Mudassar
2010 Guangzhou	Pakistan (PAK); Zeeshan Ashraf; Muhammad Zubair; Waseem Ahmed; Muhammad Irfan; Muhammad Imran; Shakeel Abbasi; Rehan Butt; Muhammad Rizwan; Salman Akbar; Abdul Haseem Khan; Fareed Ahmed; Muhammad Waqas; Shafqat Rasool; Muhammad Rashid; Muhammad Tousiq; Sohail Abbas	Malaysia (MAS); Jamaluddin Roslan; Baljit Singh Charun; Hafifihafiz Hanafi; Izwan Firdaus; Mohd Amin Rahim; Mohd Marhan Jalil; Faizal Saari; Azreen Rizal; Madzli Ikmar; Tengku Ahmad Tajuddin; Nabil Fiqri; Sukri Mutalib; Razie Rahim; Azlan Misron; Shahrun Nabil; Kumar Subramaniam	India (IND); Bharat Chettri; Bharat Chhikara; Danish Mujtaba; Sandeep Singh; Arjun Halappa; Prabodh Tirkey; Dhananjay Mahadik; Sardara Singh; Dharamvir Singh; Ravi Pal; Sarvanjit Singh; Shivendra Singh; Gurbaj Singh; Tushar Khandker; Rajpal Singh; Vikram Pillay
2014 Incheon	India (IND); Rupinder Pal Singh; Kothajit Singh; Manpreet Singh; Sardara Singh; Dharamvir Singh; V. R. Raghunath; Gurbaj Singh; P. R. Sreejesh; Danish Mujtaba; Gurwinder Singh Chandi; S. V. Sunil; Birendra Lakra; Akashdeep Singh; Chinglensana Singh; Ramandeep Singh; Nikkin Thimmaiah	Pakistan (PAK); Imran Butt; Muhammad Imran; Muhammad Irfan; Ammad Shakeel Butt; Fareed Ahmed; Rashid Mehmood; Muhammad Waqas; Muhammad Umar Bhutta; Abdul Haseem Khan; Shafqat Rasool; Shakeel Abbasi; Muhammad Rizwan; Muhammad Tousiq; Muhammad Rizwan; Muhammad Dilber; Kashif Shah	South Korea (KOR); Lee Myung-ho; Oh Dae-keun; Lee Nam-yong; Kang Moon-kweon; Lee Seung-il; Yoon Sung-hoon; You Hyo-sik; Jung Man-jae; Kang Moon-kyu; Hyun Hye-sung; Hong Eun-seong; Kim Young-jin; Lee Seung-hoon; Kim Seong-kyu; Jang Jong-hyun; Nam Hyun-woo
2018 Jakarta–Palembang	Japan (JPN); Koji Yamasaki; Genki Mitani; Seren Tanaka; Hiromasa Ochiai; Kazuma Murata; Suguru Hoshi; Kenta Tanaka; Kenji Kitazato; Manabu Yamashita; Kaito Tanaka; Kentaro Fukuda; Masaki Ohashi; Shota Yamada; Yusuke Takano; Hirotaka Zendana; Takashi Yoshikawa Kota Watanabe; Yoshiki Kirishita	Malaysia (MAS); Marhan Jalil; Fitri Saari; Joel van Huizen; Faizal Saari; Syed Syafiq Syed Cholan; Sukri Mutalib; Firhan Ashaari; Amirul Aideed; Nabil Fiqri; Kumar Subramaniam; Razie Rahim; Faiz Helmi Jali; Azri Hassan; Meor Azuan Hassan; Tengku Ahmad Tajuddin; Nik Aiman Nik Rozemi; Shahril Saabah; Hairi Rahman	India (IND); Harmanpreet Singh; Dilpreet Singh; Rupinder Pal Singh; Surender Kumar; Manpreet Singh; Sardara Singh; Simranjeet Singh; Mandeep Singh; Lalit Upadhyay; P. R. Sreejesh; Krishan Pathak; Varun Kumar; S. V. Sunil; Birendra Lakra; Akashdeep Singh; Chinglensana Singh; Amit Rohidas; Vivek Prasad
2022 Hangzhou	India (IND); Harmanpreet Singh; Abhishek Nain; Gurjant Singh; Hardik Singh; Manpreet Singh; Jarmanpreet Singh; Sanjay; Mandeep Singh; Lalit Upadhyay; Shamsher Singh; Sukhjeet Singh; Varun Kumar; Sumit Walmiki; P. R. Sreejesh; Krishan Pathak; Nilakanta Sharma; Amit Rohidas; Vivek Prasad	Japan (JPN); Raiki Fujishima; Kentaro Fukuda; Ryosei Kato; Kosei Kawabe; Yamato Kawahara; Takumi Kitagawa; Genki Mitani; Yuma Nagai; Ken Nagayoshi; Takuma Niwa; Masaki Ohashi; Ryoma Ooka; Taiki Takade; Kaito Tanaka; Seren Tanaka; Shota Yamada; Manabu Yamashita; Takashi Yoshikawa	South Korea (KOR); Hwang Tae-il; Jang Jong-hyun; Jeong Jun-woo; Ji Woo-cheon; Jung Man-jae; Kang Young-bin; Kim Hyeong-jin; Kim Jae-hyeon; Kim Jung-hoo; Kim Sung-hyun; Lee Hye-seung; Lee Jung-jun; Lee Ju-young; Lee Nam-yong; Lee Seung-hoon; Park Cheo-leon; Son Da-in; Yang Ji-hun
2026 Aichi-Nagoya	India; Jarmanpreet Singh; Abhishek; Manpreet Singh; Hardik Singh; Dilpreet Singh; Mandeep Singh; Harmanpreet Singh; Sumit; Nilakanta Sharma; Raj Kumar Pal; Mohith Shashikumar Honnenahalli; Amit Rohidas; Jugraj Singh; Vivek Sagar Prasad; Sukhjeet Singh; Yashdeep Siwach; Sanjay; Suraj Karkera; Rajinder Singh; Shilanand Lakra	Malaysia; Marhan Jalil; Fitri Saari; Faizal Saari; Akhimullah Anuar; Shello Silverius; Zaimi Mat Deris; Faiz Jali; Ashran Hamsani; Hafizuddin Othman; Norsyafiq Sumantri; Abu Kamal Azrai; Aiman Rozemi; Muhajir Abdu Rauf; Shafiq Hassan; Amirul Azahar; Faris Harizan; Azimuddin Kamaruddin; Aminuddin Mohd Zain; Andywalfian Jeffrynus; Nur Aqilrullah Che	Pakistan; Waqar Ali; Muhammad Abdullah; Sufyan Khan; Moin Shakeel; Waheed Rana; Hannan Shahid; Zikriya Hayat; Arshad Liaqat; Adeel Latif; Ahmad Nadeem; Ghazanfar Ali; Ammad Butt; Muhammad Hammadudin; Abdul Rehman; Afraz Hakeem; Umar Mustafa; Abu Mahmood; Ali Raza; Abdul Manan; Muhammad Ammad

== Women ==
Games	Gold	Silver	Bronze
1982 New Delhi	India (IND); Fiona Albuquerque; Gangotri Bhandari; Sudha Chaudhary; Selma D'Silva; Anurita Dubey; Pritpal Kaur; Rajbir Kaur; Sharanjit Kaur; Davinder Khokhar; S. Omana Kumari; Nazleen Madraswalla; Eliza Nelson; Varsha Soni; Prem Maya Sonir; Margaret Toscano; Razia Zaidi	South Korea (KOR); Cho Ki-hyang; Choi Eun-ok; Chung Sang-hyun; Han Ok-kyung; Hwang Keum-sook; Jin Won-sim; Kim Mi-sun; Kim Seong-sook; Lee Ji-hye; Lee Woe-nam; Lim Hyang-sil; Lim Kye-sook; Na Myung-wol; Seo Kwang-mi; Shin Kyung-hee; Yoo Hyun-sook	Malaysia (MAL); Norizan Abdul Majid; Asma Amin; Daphne Boudville; Christina Chin; Goh Joo Paik; Elizabeth Gomez; Mary Lim; Lum Sau Foong; Maheswari Kanniah; Rawiyah Rawi; Noorlaila Senawi; Mary Soo; Teh Siew Bee; Halimaton Yaacob; Yew Seok Ann; Yuen Lai Heng
1986 Seoul	South Korea (KOR); Cho Ki-hyang; Choi Choon-ok; Choi Young-ja; Chung Eun-kyung; Chung Sang-hyun; Han Ok-kyung; Hwang Keum-sook; Jin Won-sim; Kim Mi-ja; Kim Mi-sun; Kim Soon-duk; Kim Young-sook; Lim Kye-sook; Park Soon-ja; Seo Hyo-sun; Seo Kwang-mi	Japan (JPN)	India (IND); Saroj Bala; Manju Bist; Donita D'Mello; Angela D'Sa; Alma Guria; Kuldeep Kaur; Rajbir Kaur; S. Omana Kumari; Bimal Parbagga; Biswasi Purty; Prem Maya Sonir; Dayamani Soy; Pushpa Srivastava; Ranjana Srivastava; Madhu Yadav; Razia Zaidi
1990 Beijing	South Korea (KOR); Chang Eun-jung; Cho Kyu-soon; Han Gum-shil; Jin Won-sim; Kim Hyung-soon; Kim Kuk-hee; Kim Gyeong-ae; Kim Soon-duk; Kwon Chang-sook; Lee Kyung-hee; Lee Ok-hee; Lee Seon-yeong; Lim Kye-sook; No Yeong-mi; Son Jeong-im; You Jae-sook	China (CHN); Ao Hongmei; Cai Donghong; Chen Jianbin; Chen Mingzhu; Ding Hongping; Fu Bin; Han Wen; Shi Yanhui; Tang Hua; Wang Yanhong; Wen Qi; Wu Yanzhen; Yang Hongbing; Yang Huiping; Ye Jinping; Yu Shuzhen	Japan (JPN)
1994 Hiroshima	South Korea (KOR); Chang Eun-jung; Cho Eun-jung; Jang Dong-suk; Jin Deok-san; Kim Myung-ok; Kim Su-jeong; Kwon Chang-sook; Kwon Soo-hyun; Lee Eun-kyung; Lee Eun-young; Lee Ji-young; Lee Seon-yeong; Oh Seung-shin; No Yeong-mi; Shin Yu-ri; You Jae-sook	Japan (JPN)	China (CHN); Cai Donghong; Chen Hong; Chen Jianbin; Chen Jing; Da Fuping; Ding Hongping; Fu Bin; Huang Junxia; Liu Hongmei; Liu Ying; Qin Limei; Shi Yanhui; Wang Yanhong; Yang Hongbing; Yu Shuzhen; Yuan Ye
1998 Bangkok	South Korea (KOR); Jo Bo-ra; Choi Kwan-sook; Choi Mi-soon; Kim Eun-jin; Kim Mi-hyeon; Kim Myung-ok; Kim Seong-eun; Kim Su-jeong; Kim Tae-seon; Ko Soon-ja; Lee Eun-young; Lee Seon-hwa; Oh Seung-shin; Park Yong-suk; Woo Hyun-jung; Yu Hui-ju	India (IND); Tingonleima Chanu; Kamla Dalal; Sunita Dalal; Suraj Lata Devi; Sita Gussain; Amandeep Kaur; Manjinder Kaur; Sandeep Kaur; Surinder Kaur; Nidhi Khullar; Jyoti Sunita Kullu; Helen Mary; Neha Singh; Pritam Rani Siwach; Maristella Tirkey	China (CHN); Cai Xuemei; Chen Hong; Chen Jing; Chen Zhaoxia; Cheng Hui; Ding Hongping; Fu Baorong; Huang Junxia; Li Shuang; Liu Lijie; Long Fengyu; Nie Yali; Qin Limei; Tang Chunling; Wang Jiuyan; Yang Huiping
2002 Busan	China (CHN); Nie Yali; Long Fengyu; Chen Zhaoxia; Ma Yibo; Cheng Hui; Huang Junxia; Fu Baorong; Li Shuang; Tang Chunling; Zhou Wanfeng; Zhang Haiying; Hou Xiaolan; Chen Qiuqi; Wang Jiuyan; Zhang Shuang; Li Aili	South Korea (KOR); Park Yong-suk; Kim Yoon-mi; Lee Jin-hui; Yu Hui-ju; Lee Seon-ok; Ki Sook-hyun; Kim Eun-jin; Lee Mi-seong; O Go-un; Kim Seong-eun; Kim Jin-gyeong; Cho Jin-ju; Lee Eun-young; Im Jeong-u; Park Jeong-suk; Kang Na-young	Japan (JPN); Rie Terazono; Keiko Miura; Akemi Kato; Yukari Yamamoto; Sachimi Iwao; Chie Kimura; Yuka Ogura; Sakae Morimoto; Kaori Chiba; Naoko Saito; Toshie Tsukui; Nami Miyazaki; Hiromi Hashimoto; Akiko Kitada; Erika Esaki; Mayumi Ono
2006 Doha	China (CHN); Nie Yali; Chen Zhaoxia; Ma Yibo; Mai Shaoyan; Huang Junxia; Fu Baorong; Li Shuang; Gao Lihua; Tang Chunling; Zhou Wanfeng; Sun Zhen; Zhang Yimeng; Li Hongxia; Ren Ye; Chen Qiuqi; Bao Ejing	Japan (JPN); Rie Terazono; Ikuko Okamura; Mayumi Ono; Keiko Miura; Chie Kimura; Yukari Yamamoto; Rika Komazawa; Sakae Morimoto; Kaori Chiba; Tomomi Komori; Toshie Tsukui; Yuko Kitano; Sachimi Iwao; Akemi Kato; Miyuki Nakagawa; Misaki Ozawa	India (IND); Dipika Murthy; Suman Bala; Rajwinder Kaur; Asunta Lakra; Binita Xess; Surinder Kaur; Mamta Kharab; Marita Tirkey; Joydeep Kaur; Ritu Rani; Jasjeet Kaur Handa; Jyoti Sunita Kullu; Pushpa Pradhan; Saba Anjum Karim; Binita Toppo; Subhadra Pradhan
2010 Guangzhou	China (CHN); Ma Yibo; Huang Xuejiao; Ma Wei; Sun Sinan; Fu Baorong; Li Shuang; Gao Lihua; Wang Zhishuang; Zhang Yimeng; Li Hongxia; Ren Ye; Zhao Yudiao; Song Qingling; De Jiaojiao; Xu Xiaoxu; Li Dongxiao	South Korea (KOR); Moon Young-hui; Kim Young-ran; Kim Bo-mi; Park Seon-mi; Lee Seon-ok; Kim Jong-hee; Park Mi-hyun; Kim Jong-eun; Kim Da-rae; Cheon Seul-ki; Jeon Yu-mi; Gim Sung-hee; Jang Soo-ji; Kim Ok-ju; Kim Eun-sil; Park Ki-ju	Japan (JPN); Sakiyo Asano; Keiko Miura; Akemi Kato; Ai Murakami; Miyuki Nakagawa; Keiko Manabe; Yukari Yamamoto; Mie Nakashima; Rika Komazawa; Kaori Chiba; Nagisa Hayashi; Mazuki Arai; Kana Nagayama; Mayumi Ono; Aki Mitsuhashi; Shiho Otsuka
2014 Incheon	South Korea (KOR); Heo Jae-seong; Kim Hyun-ji; Shin Hye-jeong; An Hyo-ju; Han Hye-lyoung; Park Mi-hyun; Kim Jong-eun; Kim Da-rae; Cho Eun-ji; Seo Jung-eun; Kim Ok-ju; Oh Sun-soon; Park Ki-ju; Jang Soo-ji; Lee Young-sil; Cheon Eun-bi	China (CHN); Li Dongxiao; Wang Mengyu; Huang Ting; Xu Xiaoxu; De Jiaojiao; Cui Qiuxia; Wu Mengrong; Xi Xiayun; Peng Yang; Liang Meiyu; Wang Na; Li Hongxia; Zhang Xiaoxue; Sun Xiao; Zhao Yudiao; Song Qingling	India (IND); Navjot Kaur; Deep Grace Ekka; Monika Malik; Thokchom Chanchan Devi; Savita Punia; Ritu Rani; Poonam Rani; Vandana Katariya; Deepika Thakur; Namita Toppo; Jaspreet Kaur; Sunita Lakra; Sushila Chanu; Rani Rampal; Amandeep Kaur; Lilima Minz
2018 Jakarta–Palembang	Japan (JPN); Megumi Kageyama; Natsuki Naito; Akiko Ota; Emi Nishikori; Shihori Oikawa; Kimika Hoshi; Mayumi Ono; Yukari Mano; Akiko Kato; Hazuki Nagai; Minami Shimizu; Yuri Nagai; Aki Yamada; Maho Segawa; Yui Ishibashi; Mami Karino Motomi Kawamura; Akio Tanaka	India (IND); Navjot Kaur; Gurjit Kaur; Deep Grace Ekka; Monika Malik; Reena Khokhar; Nikki Pradhan; Savita Punia; Rajani Etimarpu; Vandana Katariya; Deepika Thakur; Udita; Namita Toppo; Lalremsiami; Navneet Kaur; Sunita Lakra; Rani Rampal; Lilima Minz; Neha Goyal	China (CHN); Gu Bingfeng; Song Xiaoming; Li Jiaqi; Cui Qiuxia; Zhou Yu; Peng Yang; Liang Meiyu; Li Hong; Zhang Jinrong; Ou Zixia; Zhang Xiaoxue; He Jiangxin; Chen Yi; De Jiaojiao; Xi Xiayun; Chen Yi; Dan Wen; Ye Jiao
2022 Hangzhou	China; Ye Jiao; Gu Bingfeng; Yang Liu; Li Jiaqi; Zhang Ying; Chen Yi; Ma Ning; Liang Meiyu; Huang Haiyan; Li Hong; Ou Zixia; Dan Wen; Zou Meirong; Zhang Xiaoxue; He Jiangxin; Chen Yang; Zhong Jiaqi; Li Xinhuan	South Korea; Seo Jung-eun; An Hyo-ju; Kang Ji-na; Cheon Eun-bi; Cho Hye-jin; Kim Min-jeong; Cho Eun-ji; Lee Yu-ri; Choi Su-ji; Kim Jeong-ihn; Seo Su-young; Park Seung-ae; Baek Ee-seul; Kim Eun-ji; An Su-jin; Pak Ho-jeong; Lee Jin-min; Kim Eun-ji	India; Deep Grace Ekka; Monika Malik; Sonika Tandi; Nikki Pradhan; Bichu Devi Kharibam; Savita Punia; Sangita Kumari; Nisha Warsi; Vandana Katariya; Udita Duhan; Lalremsiami; Navneet Kaur; Sushila Chanu; Salima Tete; Neha Goyal; Ishika Chaudhary; Deepika Kumari; Vaishnavi Phalke
2026 Aichi-Nagoya	India; Ishika Chaudhary; Nikki Pradhan; Bichu Devi; Savita Punia; Shilpi Dabas; Lalremsiami Hmarzote; Deepika Soreng; Baljeet Kaur; Ishika; Jyoti Rumavat; Navneet Kaur; Sushila Chanu; Sunelita Toppo; Salima Tete; Neha Goyal; Rutuja Pisal; Lalthantluangi; Sakshi Rana; Beauty Dungdung; Deepika Sehrawat	China; Yang Liu; Zhang Ying; Chen Yi; Ma Ning; Zhong Jiaqi; Dan Wen; Li Hong; Ou Zixia; Peng Yang; Zou Meirong; He Jiangxin; Fan Yunxia; Chen Yang; Liu Ping; Tan Jinzhuang; Liu Chencheng; Li Ting; Chen Tong; Yu Anhui; Luo Yaxi	Japan; Akio Tanaka; Miyu Suzuki; Ikumi Matsu; Hanami Saito; Nanako Tateiwa; Emi Nishikori; Mayuri Horikawa; Shiho Kobayakawa; Mai Toriyama; Amiru Shimada; Akari Nakagomi; Hiroka Murayama; Saki Tanaka; Miyu Hasegawa; Yu Kudo; Maho Ueno; Rui Takashima; Maho Segawa; Haruka Kawaguchi; Nanami Kaneko
