= Field hockey at the 1996 Summer Olympics – Men's team squads =

These are the twelve men's team squads that competed in the field hockey tournament at the 1996 Summer Olympics in Atlanta, United States.

== Pool A ==
=== Argentina ===
Head Coach: Miguel MacCormík

1. Pablo Moreira (GK, c)
2. Jorge Querejeta
3. Edgardo Pailos
4. Diego Chiodo
5. Alejandro Doherty
6. Fernando Moresi
7. Rodolfo Pérez
8. Carlos Retegui
9. Jorge Lombi
10. Gabriel Minadeo
11. Fernando Ferrara
12. Leandro Baccaro
13. Rodolfo Schmitt
14. Santiago Capurro
15. Maximiliano Caldas
16. Pablo Lombi

=== Germany ===
Head Coach: Paul Lissek

1. Christopher Reitz (GK)
2. Michael Knauth
3. Jan-Peter Tewes
4. Carsten Fischer
5. Christian Blunck
6. Stefan Saliger
7. Björn Emmerling
8. Patrick Bellenbaum
9. Sven Meinhardt
10. Christoph Bechmann
11. Oliver Domke
12. Andreas Becker
13. Michael Green
14. Klaus Michler
15. Volker Fried
16. Christian Mayerhöfer

=== India ===
Head Coach: Cedric D'Souza

1. Subbaiah Anjaparavanda
2. Harpreet Singh
3. Mohammed Riaz
4. Sanjeev Kumar
5. Baljit Singh Saini
6. Sabu Varkey
7. Mukesh Kumar
8. Rahul Singh
9. Dhanraj Pillay
10. Pargat Singh (c)
11. Baljit Singh Dhillon
12. Alloysius Edwards
13. Anil Alexander Aldrin
14. Gavin Ferreira
15. Ramandeep Singh
16. Dilip Tirkey

=== Pakistan ===
Head Coach: Jahangir Butt

1. Mansoor Ahmed (c, GK)
2. Muhammad Danish Kaleem
3. Naveed Alam
4. Muhammad Usman
5. Muhammad Khalid
6. Muhammad Shafqat Malik
7. Muhammad Sarwar
8. Tahir Zaman
9. Kamran Ashraf
10. Muhammad Shahbaz
11. Shahbaz Ahmed
12. Khalid Mahmood
13. Mujahid Ali Rana
14. Irfan Mahmood
15. Aleem Raza
16. Rahim Khan

=== Spain ===
Head Coach: Toni Forrellat

1. Ramón Jufresa (GK)
2. Óscar Barrena
3. Joaquim Malgosa
4. Jordi Arnau
5. Juantxo García-Mauriño
6. Jaume Amat
7. Juan Escarré
8. Victor Pujol
9. Ignacio Cobos
10. Xavier Escudé
11. Javier Arnau
12. Ramón Sala
13. Juan Dinarés
14. Pol Amat
15. Pablo Usoz
16. Antonio González

=== United States ===
Head Coach: Jon Clark

1. Tom Vano
2. Steve Danielson
3. Larry Amar
4. Marq Mellor
5. Scott Williams
6. Steve Jennings
7. Steven van Randwijck
8. Mark Wentges
9. John O'Neill
10. Eelco Wassenaar
11. Nick Butcher
12. Ahmed Elmaghraby
13. Phil Sykes
14. Otto Steffers
15. Ben Maruquin
16. Steve Wagner (GK)

== Pool B ==
=== Australia ===
Head Coach: Frank Murray

1. Mark Hager
2. Stephen Davies
3. Baeden Choppy
4. Lachlan Elmer
5. Stuart Carruthers
6. Grant Smith
7. Damon Diletti (GK)
8. Lachlan Dreher (GK)
9. Brendan Garard
10. Paul Gaudoin
11. Paul Lewis
12. Matthew Smith
13. Jay Stacy
14. Daniel Sproule
15. Ken Wark
16. Michael York

=== Great Britain ===
Head Coach: Jonathon Copp

1. Simon Mason (GK)
2. David Luckes (GK)
3. Jon Wyatt
4. Julian Halls
5. Soma Singh
6. Simon Hazlitt
7. Jason Laslett
8. Kalbir Takher
9. Jason Lee
10. Nick Thompson
11. Chris Mayer
12. Phil McGuire
13. Russell Garcia
14. John Shaw
15. Calum Giles
16. Daniel Hall

=== South Korea ===
Head Coach: Jeon Jae-hong

1. Gu Jin-su (GK)
2. Sin Seok-gyo
3. Han Byeong-guk
4. Yu Myeong-gun
5. Cho Myung-jun
6. Jeon Jong-ha
7. Yu Seung-jin
8. Park Sin-heung
9. Kang Keon-wook
10. Kim Jong-i
11. Jeong Yong-gyun
12. Song Seung-tae
13. Kim Yong-bae
14. Hong Gyeong-seop
15. Kim Yeong-gwi
16. Kim Yoon

=== Malaysia ===
Head Coach: Volker Knapp

1. Mohamed Nasihin Nubil Ibrahim
2. Maninderjit Singh Magmar
3. Lailin Abu Hassan
4. Brian Siva
5. Lim Chiow Chuan
6. Charles David
7. Chairil Anwar Abdul Aziz
8. Lam Mun Fatt
9. Shankar Ramu
10. Nor Saiful Zaini Nasir-ud-Din
11. Kaliswaran Muniandy
12. Aphthar Singh Piara
13. Mirnawan Nawawi
14. Calvin Fernandez
15. Kuhan Shanmuganathan
16. Hamdan Hamzah

=== Netherlands ===
Head Coach: Roelant Oltmans

1. Ronald Jansen (GK)
2. Bram Lomans
3. Leo Klein Gebbink
4. Erik Jazet
5. Tycho van Meer
6. Wouter van Pelt
7. Marc Delissen
8. Jacques Brinkman
9. Maurits Crucq
10. Stephan Veen
11. Floris Jan Bovelander
12. Jeroen Delmee (c)
13. Guus Vogels (GK)
14. Teun de Nooijer
15. Remco van Wijk
16. Taco van den Honert

=== South Africa ===
Head Coach: Gavin Featherstone

1. Brian Myburgh (GK)
2. Brad Milne
3. Shaun Cooke
4. Craig Jackson
5. Craig Fulton
6. Bradley Michalaro
7. Gregg Clark
8. Gary Boddington
9. Alistar Frederdicks
10. Wayne Graham
11. Kevin Chree
12. Charles Teversham
13. Greg Nicol
14. Matthew Hallowes
15. Grant Fulton
16. Murray Anderson
