= List of National Sports Award recipients in field hockey =

National Sports Awards in Hockey
- Various civilian awards for contributions to Sports (Individual/Team)
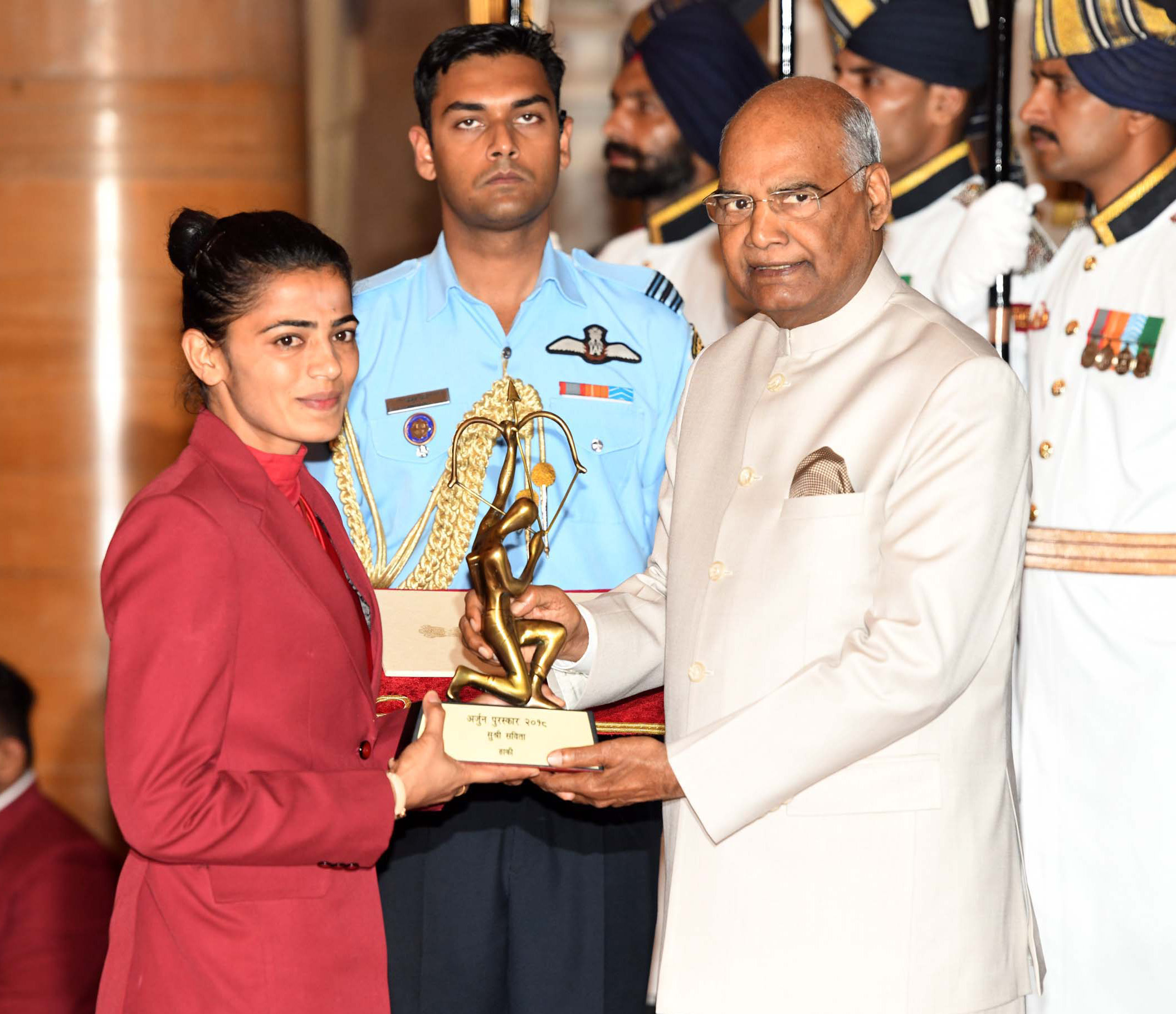
- Awarded for: Various sports honour of India
- Sponsored by: Government of India
- Location: Rashtrapati Bhavan
- Country: Republic of India
- Presented by: President of India
- First award: 1961
- Final award: 2024

Highlights
- Total awarded: 134
- Awards: Arjuna Award; Dronacharya Award; Major Dhyan Chand Khel Ratna; Dhyan Chand Award

The National Sports Awards is the collective name given to the six sports awards of Republic of India. It is awarded annually by the Ministry of Youth Affairs and Sports. They are presented by the President of India in the same ceremony at the Rashtrapati Bhavan usually on 29 August each year along with the national adventure award. As of 2020, a total of one hundred and twenty-three individuals have been awarded the various National Sports Awards in hockey. The four awards presented in hockey are Major Dhyan Chand Khel Ratna, Arjuna Award, Dhyan Chand Award and Dronacharya Award.

First presented in the year 1961, a total of ninety individuals have been honoured with the Arjuna Award in hockey for their "good performance at the international level" over the period of last four years, with seven individuals being awarded for their lifetime contribution. First presented in the year 2000, a total of thirteen coaches have been honoured with the Dronacharya Award in hockey for their "outstanding work on a consistent basis and enabling sportspersons to excel in international events" over the period of last four years, with five coaches being awarded in the lifetime contribution category. First presented in the year 1999–2000, a total of three sportspersons have been honoured with the Rajiv Gandhi Khel Ratna, the highest sporting honour of India, in hockey for their "most outstanding performance at the international level" over the period of last four years. First presented in the year 2002, a total of seventeen retired sportspersons have been honoured with the Dhyan Chand Award, the lifetime achievement sporting honour of India, in hockey for their "good performance at the international level and their continued contributions to the promotion of sports even after their career as a sportsperson is over." One awardee Surjit Singh Randhawa was honoured Arjuna Award posthumously in the year 1998.

== Recipients ==
Key
+ Indicates a Lifetime contribution honour	# Indicates a posthumous honour

List of National Sports award recipients, showing the year, award and gender
Year	Recipient	Award	Gender
1999–2000	Dhanraj Pillay	Rajiv Gandhi Khel Ratna	Male
2017	Sardara Singh	Rajiv Gandhi Khel Ratna	Male
2020	Rani Rampal	Rajiv Gandhi Khel Ratna	Female
2021	P. R. Sreejesh	Major Dhyan Chand Khel Ratna	Male
2021	Manpreet Singh	Major Dhyan Chand Khel Ratna	Male
2024	Harmanpreet Singh	Major Dhyan Chand Khel Ratna	Male
1961	Ann Lumsden	Arjuna Award	Female
1961	Prithipal Singh	Arjuna Award	Male
1963	Charanjit Singh	Arjuna Award	Male
1964	Shankar Lakshman	Arjuna Award	Male
1965	Elvera Britto	Arjuna Award	Female
1965	Udham Singh	Arjuna Award	Male
1966	John Peter	Arjuna Award	Male
1966	Sunita Puri	Arjuna Award	Female
1966	Gurbaksh Singh	Arjuna Award	Male
1967	Mohinder Lal	Arjuna Award	Male
1967	Harbinder Singh	Arjuna Award	Male
1967	Jagjit Singh	Arjuna Award	Male
1968	Balbir Singh Kular	Arjuna Award	Male
1970	Ajit Pal Singh	Arjuna Award	Male
1971	Krishnamurthy Perumal	Arjuna Award	Male
1972	Michael Kindo	Arjuna Award	Male
1973	M. P. Ganesh	Arjuna Award	Male
1973	O. Mascarenhas	Arjuna Award	Female
1974	Ajinder Kaur	Arjuna Award	Female
1974	Ashok Kumar	Arjuna Award	Male
1975	B. P. Govinda	Arjuna Award	Male
1975	Rupa Saini	Arjuna Award	Female
1977–1978	Leslie Fernandez	Arjuna Award	Female
1977–1978	Harcharan Singh	Arjuna Award	Male
1979–1980	Vasudevan Baskaran	Arjuna Award	Male
1979–1980	Rekha B. Mundhphan	Arjuna Award	Female
1980–1981	Eliza Nelson	Arjuna Award	Female
1980–1981	Mohammed Shahid	Arjuna Award	Male
1981	Varsha Soni	Arjuna Award	Female
1983	Zafar Iqbal	Arjuna Award	Male
1984	Rajbir Kaur	Arjuna Award	Female
1985	Somiya Maney	Arjuna Award	Male
1985	Prem Maya Sonir	Arjuna Award	Female
1986	Joaquim Carvalho	Arjuna Award	Male
1988	M. P. Singh	Arjuna Award	Male
1989	Pargat Singh	Arjuna Award	Male
1990	Jagbir Singh	Arjuna Award	Male
1992	Mervyn Fernandis	Arjuna Award	Male
1994	Jude Felix Sabastian	Arjuna Award	Male
1995	Mukesh Kumar	Arjuna Award	Male
1995	Dhanraj Pillay	Arjuna Award	Male
1996	Ashish Ballal	Arjuna Award	Male
1996	A. B. Subbaiah	Arjuna Award	Male
1997	Harmik Singh	Arjuna Award	Male
1997	Rajinder Singh	Arjuna Award	Male
1997	Surinder Singh Sodhi	Arjuna Award	Male
1998	Baljit Singh Dhillon	Arjuna Award	Male
1998	Maharaj Krishan Kaushik	Arjuna Award	Male
1998	S. Omana Kumari	Arjuna Award	Female
1998	Surjit Singh Randhawa^{#}	Arjuna Award	Male
1998	Mohammed Riaz	Arjuna Award	Male
1998	Baldev Singh	Arjuna Award	Male
1998	Pritam Rani Siwach	Arjuna Award	Female
1999	Haripal Kaushik ^{+}	Arjuna Award	Male
1999	Balbir Singh Kullar ^{+}	Arjuna Award	Male
1999	Victor Philips ^{+}	Arjuna Award	Male
1999	Ramandeep Singh	Arjuna Award	Male
2000	Raghbir Singh Bhola ^{+}	Arjuna Award	Male
2000	Tingonleima Chanu	Arjuna Award	Female
2000	Jalaluddin Rizvi ^{+}	Arjuna Award	Male
2000	Baljit Singh Saini	Arjuna Award	Male
2000	Balkrishan Singh ^{+}	Arjuna Award	Male
2000	Madhu Yadav ^{+}	Arjuna Award	Female
2001	Sita Gussain	Arjuna Award	Female
2001	Dilip Tirkey	Arjuna Award	Male
2002	Mamta Kharab	Arjuna Award	Female
2002	Gagan Ajit Singh	Arjuna Award	Male
2003	Devesh Chauhan	Arjuna Award	Male
2003	Suraj Lata Devi	Arjuna Award	Female
2004	Helen Mary	Arjuna Award	Female
2004	Deepak Thakur	Arjuna Award	Male
2005	Viren Rasquinha	Arjuna Award	Male
2006	Jyoti Sunita Kullu	Arjuna Award	Female
2007	Prabhjot Singh	Arjuna Award	Male
2009	Surinder Kaur	Arjuna Award	Female
2009	Ignace Tirkey	Arjuna Award	Male
2010	Jasjeet Kaur Handa	Arjuna Award	Female
2010	Sandeep Singh	Arjuna Award	Male
2011	Rajpal Singh	Arjuna Award	Male
2012	Sardara Singh	Arjuna Award	Male
2013	Saba Anjum Karim	Arjuna Award	Female
2015	P. R. Sreejesh	Arjuna Award	Male
2016	V. R. Raghunath	Arjuna Award	Male
2016	Ritu Rani	Arjuna Award	Female
2017	S. V. Sunil	Arjuna Award	Male
2018	Savita Punia	Arjuna Award	Female
2018	Manpreet Singh	Arjuna Award	Male
2019	Chinglensana Kangujam	Arjuna Award	Male
2020	Akashdeep Singh	Arjuna Award	Male
2020	Deepika Thakur	Arjuna Award	Female
2021	Monika Malik	Arjuna Award	Female
2021	Vandana Katariya	Arjuna Award	Female
2021	Dilpreet Singh	Arjuna Award	Male
2021	Harmanpreet Singh	Arjuna Award	Male
2021	Rupinder Pal Singh	Arjuna Award	Male
2021	Surender Kumar	Arjuna Award	Male
2021	Amit Rohidas	Arjuna Award	Male
2021	Birendra Lakra	Arjuna Award	Male
2021	Sumit Walmiki	Arjuna Award	Male
2021	Nilakanta Sharma	Arjuna Award	Male
2021	Hardik Singh	Arjuna Award	Male
2021	Vivek Sagar Prasad	Arjuna Award	Male
2021	Gurjant Singh	Arjuna Award	Male
2021	Mandeep Singh	Arjuna Award	Male
2021	Shamsher Singh	Arjuna Award	Male
2021	Lalit Kumar Upadhyay	Arjuna Award	Male
2021	Varun Kumar	Arjuna Award	Male
2021	Simranjeet Singh	Arjuna Award	Male
2022	Deep Grace Ekka	Arjuna Award	Female
2023	Krishan Pathak	Arjuna Award	Male
2023	Sushila Chanu	Arjuna Award	Female
2024	Salima Tete	Arjuna Award	Female
2024	Abhishek Nain	Arjuna Award	Male
2024	Sanjay Rana	Arjuna Award	Male
2024	Jarmanpreet Singh	Arjuna Award	Male
2024	Sukhjeet Singh	Arjuna Award	Male
2002	Ashok Diwan	Dhyan Chand Award	Male
2003	Charles Cornelius	Dhyan Chand Award	Male
2003	Dharam Singh	Dhyan Chand Award	Male
2004	Hardayal Singh	Dhyan Chand Award	Male
2005	Rajinder Singh	Dhyan Chand Award	Male
2006	Nandy Singh	Dhyan Chand Award	Male
2007	Varinder Singh	Dhyan Chand Award	Male
2008	Mukhbain Singh	Dhyan Chand Award	Male
2012	Gundeep Kumar	Dhyan Chand Award	Male
2013	Syed Ali	Dhyan Chand Award	Male
2014	Gurmail Singh	Dhyan Chand Award	Male
2015	Romeo James	Dhyan Chand Award	Male
2016	Sylvanus Dung Dung	Dhyan Chand Award	Male
2017	Sumrai Tete	Dhyan Chand Award	Female
2018	Bharat Chettri	Dhyan Chand Award	Male
2019	Manuel Frederick	Dhyan Chand Award	Male
2020	Ajit Pal Singh	Dhyan Chand Award	Male
2021	Davinder Singh	Dhyan Chand Award	Male
2022	Dharamvir Singh	Dhyan Chand Award	Male
2023	Vineet Kumar Sharma	Dhyan Chand Award	Male
2011	Rajinder Singh Jr. ^{+}	Dronacharya Award	Male
2017	P. A. Raphel ^{+}	Dronacharya Award	Male
2018	Clarence Lobo ^{+}	Dronacharya Award	Male
2019	Merzban Patel ^{+}	Dronacharya Award	Male
2020	Romesh Pathania ^{+}	Dronacharya Award	Male
2021	Sarpal Singh ^{+}	Dronacharya Award	Male
2000	Gudial Singh Bhangu	Dronacharya Award	Male
2002	Maharaj Krishan Kaushik	Dronacharya Award	Male
2003	Rajinder Singh Jr.	Dronacharya Award	Male
2009	S. Baldev Singh	Dronacharya Award	Male
2010	Ajay Kumar Bansal	Dronacharya Award	Male
2012	Harendra Singh	Dronacharya Award	Male
2013	Narender Singh Saini	Dronacharya Award	Male
2020	Jude Sebastian	Dronacharya Award	Male
2021	Pritam Rani Siwach	Dronacharya Award	Female
2023	Shivendra Singh	Dronacharya Award	Male
2024	Sandeep Sangwan	Dronacharya Award	Male
