= Pakistan national field hockey team records and statistics =

This article lists various records and statistics of Pakistan national field hockey team.

== Honors ==
- Olympics
  - Winners (3): (gold) 1960, 1968, 1984
  - Runner-up (3): (silver) 1956, 1964, 1972
  - Third place (2): (bronze) 1976, 1992
  - Fourth place (3): 1948, 1952, 2000
- Hockey World Cup
  - Winners (4): (gold) 1971, 1978, 1982, 1994
  - Runner-up (2): (silver) 1975, 1990
  - Fourth place (1): 1973
- Hockey Champions Trophy
  - Winners (3): (gold) 1978, 1980, 1994
  - Runner-up (7): (silver) 1983, 1984, 1988, 1991, 1996, 1998, 2014
  - Third place(7): (bronze) 1986, 1992, 1995, 2002, 2003, 2004, 2012
  - Fourth place (7): 1981, 1982, 1985, 1989, 1990, 1993, 2001
- Asian Games
  - Winners (8): (gold) 1958, 1962, 1970, 1974, 1978, 1982, 1990, 2010
  - Runner-up (3): (silver) 1966, 1986, 2014
  - Third place (3): (bronze) 1994, 1998, 2006
  - Fourth place (2): 2002, 2018
- Hockey Asia Cup
  - Winners (3): (gold) 1982, 1985, 1989
  - Runner-ups (3): (silver) 1999, 2003, 2009
  - Third place (3): (bronze) 1994, 2013, 2017

== Individual records ==
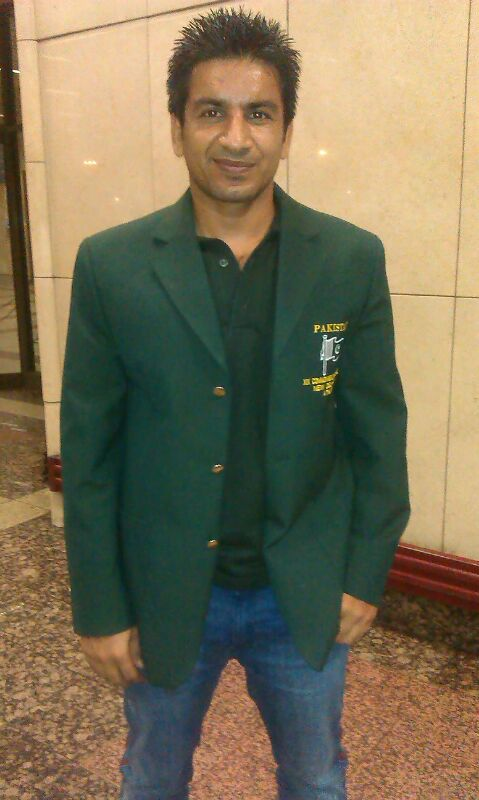
Waseem Ahmed is the most capped player in history of Pakistan with 419 caps.

=== Appearances ===
==== Most Appearances ====
As of 18 September 2021, the following players had most caps for Pakistan:

Players in bold were still active.

Rank	Player	Caps	Goals	Career
1	Waseem Ahmed	419	350	1996-2013
2	Sohail Abbas	311	348	1998-2012
3	Shakeel Abbasi	309	103	2003-2014
4	Shahbaz Ahmed	304	101	1986-2002
5	Muhammad Imran	289	106	2004-2015
6	Rehan Butt	274	110	2002-2012
7	Tahir Zaman	252	134	1987-1998
8	Mansoor Ahmed	238	0	1986-1997
9	Zeeshan Ashraf	235	3	2001-2010
10	Muhammad Saqlain	233	32	1999-2009
11	Muhammad Waqas Sharif	216	60	2005-2015
12	Abdul Rashid-ul Hassan	199	9	1979-1987
13	Waseem Feroz	197	55	1984-1994
14	Muhammad Sarwar	196	44	1995-2004
14	**Muhammad Umar Bhutta**	196	34	2009-2019
16	Shafqat Rasool	194	25	2008-2018
17	Salman Akbar	193	0	2002-2013
18	Muhammad Nadeem	192	49	1994-2004
19	Muhammad Irfan	191	28	2008-2018
20	**Muhammad Rizwan Ahmed**	184	25	2009-2019

=== Goalscorers ===
==== Top goalscorers ====
As of 18 September 2021, the following players had at least 50 goals for Pakistan on their credt:

Players in bold were still active.

Rank	Player	Goals	Caps	Career	Average
1	Sohail Abbas	348	311	1998-2012	1.11
2	Hassan Sardar	150	148	1979-1987	1.01
3	Tahir Zaman	134	252	1987-1998	0.53
4	Kamran Ashraf	129	166	1993-2002	0.77
5	Hanif Khan	127	177	1976-1985	0.71
6	Rehan Butt	110	274	2002-2012	0.40
7	Muhammad Imran	106	289	2004-2015	0.36
8	Shakeel Abbasi	103	309	2003–2014	0.33
9	Manzoor-ul-Hassan	101	154	1972-1982	0.65
10	Shahbaz Ahmed	101	304	1986-2002	0.32
11	Kaleemullah Khan	97	176	1979-1986	0.55
12	Abdul Rashid Jr.	96	89	1968-1976	1.07
13	Muhammad Shahbaz	89	168	1991-1999	0.52
14	Manzoor Hussain	86	175	1975-1984	0.49
14	Kashif Jawad	86	180	1999-2004	0.47
16	Abdul Haseem Khan	70	171	2009-2017	0.40
17	Khalild Bashir	66	143	1987-1993	0.46
18	Muhammad Waqas Sharif	60	216	2005-2015	0.27
19	Atif Bashir	59	118	1995-2000	0.50
20	Waseem Feroz	55	197	1984-1994	0.27
20	Samiullah Khan	55	155	1971-1982	0.35
22	Abdul Waheed Khan	52	56	1960-1966	0.92
23	Tariq Niazi	50	76	1961-1968	0.65

==== Other Records ====
- **Olympic Records**
  - **First goal: Ali Iqtidar Shah Dara**, 2 August 1948, 2-1 vs Belgium
  - **Most goals in the Olympics: Sohail Abbas,** 22 goals (2000-2012)
  - **Most goals in a single Olympics tournament: Sohail Abbas,** 11 goals (2004)
  - **Most goals in a single Olympics match: Aziz Malik, —8 goals',** 3 August 1948, 9-0 vs **Denmark**
- **Hockey World Cup Records**
  - **Most goals in the World Cup: Sohail Abbas,** 18 goals (1998-2010)
  - **Most goals in a single World Cup tournament: Hassan Sardar** (1982) and **Sohail Abbas** (2002), 10 goals each
  - **Most goals in a single World Cup match: Hassan Sardar**, **—4 goals'**, 2 January 1982, 12-3 vs New Zealand
- **Hockey Champions Trophy Records**
  - **Most goals in the Champions Trophy: Sohail Abbas**, 41 goals (1998-2011)
  - **Most goals in a single Champions Trophy tournament: Sohail Abbas**, 9 goals (2003)
  - Most goals in a single Champions Trophy match:
    - **Hanif Khan**, **—3 goals'**, 3 January 1980, 7-1 vs India
    - **Samiullah Khan**, **—3 goals'**, 6 January 1980, 7-1 vs Australia
    - **Musaddiq Hussain**, **—3 goals'**, 17 November 1990, 6-3 vs Germany
    - **Tahir Zaman**, **—3 goals'**, 22 November 1990, 4-1 vs Soviet Union
    - **Musaddiq Hussain**, **—3 goals'**, 1 September 1991, 7-2 vs Soviet Union
    - **Sohail Abbas**, **—3 goals'**, 7 November 2001, 4-5 vs Germany
    - **Kashif Jawad**, **—3 goals'**, 10 November 2001, 3-6 vs England
- **Asian Games Records**
  - **Most goals in the Asian Games: Abdul Waheed Khan**, 25 goals (1962-1966)
  - **Most goals in a single Asian Games tournament: Abdul Waheed Khan**, 17 goals (1962)
  - **Most goals in a single Asian Games match: Shahnaz Sheikh**, **—7 goals'**, 15 December 1978, 17-0 vs Bangladesh
- **Hockey Asia Cup Records**
  - **Most goals in the Asia Cup: Sohail Abbas**, 24 goals (1999-2009)
  - **Most goals in a single Asia Cup tournament: Hassan Sardar** (1982) and **Sohail Abbas** (1999), 16 goals each
  - **Most goals in a single Asia Cup match: Rahim Khan**, **—6 goals',** 9 November 1993, 20-0 vs Thailand

== Team records ==
=== Biggest victory ===
==== By margin ====
Opponent	Result	Venue	Date	Competition
Nepal	22-0	Chennai, India	24 December 1995	1995 South Asian Games
Thailand	20-0	Hiroshima, Japan	9 November 1993	1993 Hockey Asia Cup
Bangladesh	17-0	Bangkok, Thailand	15 December 1978	1978 Asian Games
Kazakhstan	0-16	Jakarta, Indonesia	24 August 2018	2018 Asian Games
Iran	16-0	Dhaka, Bangladesh	21 January 1985	1985 Hockey Asia Cup
Sri Lanka	15-0	Kuala Lumpur, Malaysia	19 November 1999	1999 Hockey Asia Cup
Sri Lanka	14-0	Incheon, South Korea	20 September 2014	2014 Asian Games
Sri Lanka	14-0	Karachi, Pakistan	13 March 1982	1982 Hockey Asia Cup
Sri Lanka	14-0	Tehran, Iran	10 September 1974	1974 Asian Games
Chinese Taipei	13-0	Ipoh, Malaysia	27 August 2013	2013 Hockey Asia Cup
Egypt	13-0	Lahore, Pakistan	13 November 1976	Jinnah Centenary Tournament
Iran	0-13	Tehran, Iran	11 September 1974	1974 Asian Games

==== By opponents ====
List of biggest victories by opponents with at least 20 matches played

Opponent	Result	Venue	Date	Competition
Canada	11-1	Christchurch, New Zealand	9 February 1974	Seven Nations Christchurch
China	10-0	Perth, Australia	14 December 1982	Esanda Hockey Tournament
Japan	10-0	Rome, Italy	1 September 1960	1960 Summer Olympics
New Zealand	12-3	Mumbai, India	2 January 1982	1982 Hockey World Cup
France	9-0	Paris, France	11 May 1991	Four Nations Paris
Malaysia	9-0	Melbourne, Australia	21 April 1979	Esanda Hockey Tournament
Argentina	9-1	Lahore, Pakistan	29 December 1969	Test match
South Korea	9-1	Karachi, Pakistan	24 November 1987	Test match
South Korea	8-0	Ipoh, Malaysia	2 August 1991	1991 Sultan Azlan Shah Cup
South Korea	8-0	Tokyo, Japan	27 May 1958	1958 Asian Games
Kenya	8-0	Seoul, South Korea	20 September 1988	1988 Summer Olympics
Belgium	8-0	Brussels, Belgium	29 August 1948	Test match
Great Britain	8-1	Sydney, Australia	18 September 2000	2000 Summer Olympics
India	7-1	New Delhi, India	1 December 1982	1982 Asian Games
India	7-1	Karachi, Pakistan	3 January 1980	1980 Hockey Champions Trophy
Australia	7-1	Karachi, Pakistan	6 January 1980	1980 Hockey Champions Trophy
Netherlands	6-0	Mexico City, Mexico	13 October 1968	1968 Summer Olympics
Spain	6-1	Barcelona, Spain	3 August 1992	1992 Summer Olympics
Spain	5-0	Kuala Lumpur, Malaysia	10 March 1975	1975 Hockey World Cup
Germany	6-1	Amstelveen, Netherlands	6 June 1982	1982 Hockey Champions Trophy
Germany	6-1	Berlin, Germany	17 August 1952	Test match
Germany	5-0	Amstelveen, Netherlands	19 August 2005	2005 Hockey RaboTrophy
Germany	5-0	Lahore, Pakistan	26 December 1954	Test match
England	5-1	Lahore, Pakistan	5 December 1989	Test match

==== Most consecutive wins ====
Wins	First win	Last win
26	Ireland 9-0, Buenos Aires, 21 March 1978	Netherlands 5-2, Groningen, 11 August 1979
23	India 7-1, Karachi, 3 January 1980	Kenya 5-0, Nairobi, 30 June 1980
19	Netherlands 3-2, Lahore, 28 November 1981	Soviet Union 5-2, Amstelveen, 7 June 1982
11	Australia 2-1, Invercargill, 6 February 1974	Japan 3-0, Tehran, 12 September 1974
11	Kenya 3-0, Mombasa, 4 August 1962	Kenya 3-0, Multan, 4 December 1962
11	Kenya 2-1, Nairobi, 20 July 1960	Malaya 3-1, Kallang, 28 December 1961

=== Biggest defeat ===
Opponent	Result	Venue	Date	Competition
India	2-10	Hangzhou, China	30 September 2023	2022 Asian Games
Australia	1-9	Melbourne, Australia	8 November 2017	Melbourne Four Nations
Netherlands	2-9	Terrassa, Spain	25 July 2006	2006 Hockey Champions Trophy
Germany	0-7	Hamburg, Germany	18 June 1994	Test match
England	0-7	London, England	27 June 2026	2025–26 FIH Pro League
Australia	0-7	London, United Kingdom	7 August 2012	2012 Summer Olympics
England	2-8	Bhubaneswar, India	7 December 2014	2014 Hockey Champions Trophy
Australia	2-8	Perth, Australia	30 October 2011	Three Nations Challenge
India	1-7	London, United Kingdom	18 June 2017	2016-17 Hockey World League
Belgium	1-7	Wavre, Belgium	13 June 2026	2025–26 FIH Pro League
India	1-7	London, England	26 June 2026	2025–26 FIH Pro League
Belgium	0-6	Wavre, Belgium	18 June 2026	2025–26 FIH Pro League

==== Most consecutive winless streak ====
Matches	First match	Last match
11	New Zealand 1-1, Wairarapa, 23 March 2017	India 1-7, London, 18 June 2017
10	Netherlands 2-6, Kuala Lumpur, 11 July 1993	Australia 1-3, Hamburg, 3 September 1993
9	England 1-4, Ismailia, 7 March 2026	England 0-7, London, 27 June 2026
8	Netherlands 2-5, Santiago del Estero, 10 December 2025	Germany 1-6, Hobart, 14 February 2026
7	Belgium 3-5, Ipoh, 14 May 2008	Belgium 2-4, Antwerp, 9 June 2008
