= Field hockey at the 1994 Asian Games =

- Venue: Hiroshima Regional Park Stadium
- Dates: 3–15 October
- Nations: 11

Field hockey events were contested at the 1994 Asian Games in Hiroshima, Japan.

== Medalists ==
| Event | Gold | Silver | Bronze |
|---|---|---|---|
| Men | South Korea; Cho Myung-jun; Choi Jung-ho; Han Beung-kook; Jeon Jong-ha; Jeong Yong-kyun; Kang Keon-wook; Kim Jong-yi; Kim Yoon; Kim Young-kyu; Koo Jin-soo; Lee Jeong-sook; Park Shin-heum; Shin Seok-kyo; Yoo Moon-ki; Yoo Seung-jin; You Myung-keun | India; Shakeel Ahmed; Anil Alexander Aldrin; Mohammed Arif; Ashish Ballal; Baljit Singh Dhillon; Devinder Kumar; Mukesh Kumar; Sanjeev Kumar; Rajnish Mishra; Ravi Nayakar; Dhanraj Pillay; Mohammed Riaz; Jude Felix Sebastian; Harpreet Singh; A. B. Subbaiah; Sabu Varkey | Pakistan; Asif Ahmed; Mansoor Ahmed; Shahbaz Ahmed; Kamran Ashraf; Ahmed Alam; Naveed Alam; Faisal Ali; Asif Bajwa; Khawaja Junaid; Muhammad Danish Kaleem; Rahim Khan; Irfan Mahmood; Muhammad Shafqat Malik; Muhammad Shahbaz; Muhammad Usman; Tahir Zaman |
| Women | South Korea; Chang Eun-jung; Cho Eun-jung; Jang Dong-sook; Jin Deok-san; Kim Myung-ok; Kim Soo-jung; Kwon Chang-sook; Kwon Soo-hyun; Lee Eun-kyung; Lee Eun-young; Lee Ji-young; Lee Seon-young; Oh Seung-shin; Ro Young-mi; Shin Yu-ri; You Jae-sook | Japan; Kuniko Hori; Akemi Kato; Hiroko Matoba; Saori Miyazaki; Masami Nishimoto; Hisayo Takahashi | China; Cai Donghong; Chen Hong; Chen Jianbin; Chen Jing; Da Fuping; Ding Hongping; Fu Bin; Huang Junxia; Liu Hongmei; Liu Ying; Qin Limei; Shi Yanhui; Wang Yanhong; Yang Hongbing; Yu Shuzhen; Yuan Ye |

== Medal table ==
| Rank | Nation | Gold | Silver | Bronze | Total |
|---|---|---|---|---|---|
| 1 | South Korea (KOR) | 2 | 0 | 0 | 2 |
| 2 | India (IND) | 0 | 1 | 0 | 1 |
| 2 | Japan (JPN) | 0 | 1 | 0 | 1 |
| 4 | China (CHN) | 0 | 0 | 1 | 1 |
| 4 | Pakistan (PAK) | 0 | 0 | 1 | 1 |
| Totals (5 entries) | | 2 | 2 | 2 | 6 |

== Results ==
=== Men ===
==== Preliminary round ====
===== Group A =====
| Pos | Team | Pld | W | D | L | GF | GA | GD | Pts |
|---|---|---|---|---|---|---|---|---|---|
| 1 | Pakistan | 4 | 4 | 0 | 0 | 19 | 2 | +17 | 8 |
| 2 | Japan | 4 | 2 | 1 | 1 | 7 | 8 | −1 | 5 |
| 3 | Kazakhstan | 4 | 2 | 0 | 2 | 13 | 7 | +6 | 4 |
| 4 | Malaysia | 4 | 1 | 1 | 2 | 10 | 8 | +2 | 3 |
| 5 | Oman | 4 | 0 | 0 | 4 | 1 | 25 | −24 | 0 |

Source: Results

4 October
16:00

| Japan | 3–1 | Oman |

Regional Park Stadium, Hiroshima

4 October
18:00

| Pakistan | 3–1 | Kazakhstan |

Regional Park Stadium, Hiroshima

5 October
16:00

| Pakistan | 4–0 | Japan |

Regional Park Stadium, Hiroshima

5 October
18:00

| Malaysia | 7–0 | Oman |

Regional Park Stadium, Hiroshima

7 October
12:00

| Pakistan | 8–0 | Oman |

Regional Park Stadium, Hiroshima

7 October
14:00

| Malaysia | 1–3 | Kazakhstan |

Regional Park Stadium, Hiroshima

8 October
16:00

| Kazakhstan | 2–3 | Japan |

Regional Park Stadium, Hiroshima

8 October
18:00

| Pakistan | 4–1 | Malaysia |

Regional Park Stadium, Hiroshima

10 October
16:00

| Malaysia | 1–1 | Japan |

Regional Park Stadium, Hiroshima

10 October
18:00

| Kazakhstan | 7–0 | Oman |

Regional Park Stadium, Hiroshima

===== Group B =====
| Pos | Team | Pld | W | D | L | GF | GA | GD | Pts |
|---|---|---|---|---|---|---|---|---|---|
| 1 | India | 3 | 3 | 0 | 0 | 7 | 1 | +6 | 6 |
| 2 | South Korea | 3 | 2 | 0 | 1 | 15 | 3 | +12 | 4 |
| 3 | China | 3 | 1 | 0 | 2 | 1 | 7 | −6 | 2 |
| 4 | Bangladesh | 3 | 0 | 0 | 3 | 0 | 12 | −12 | 0 |

Source: Results

4 October
12:00

| South Korea | 4–0 | China |

Regional Park Stadium, Hiroshima

4 October
14:00

| India | 1–0 | Bangladesh |

Regional Park Stadium, Hiroshima

7 October
16:00

| India | 3–0 | China |

Regional Park Stadium, Hiroshima

7 October
18:00

| South Korea | 10–0 | Bangladesh |

Regional Park Stadium, Hiroshima

10 October
12:00

| Bangladesh | 0–1 | China |

Regional Park Stadium, Hiroshima

10 October
14:00

| South Korea | 1–3 | India |

Regional Park Stadium, Hiroshima

==== 5th–8th placings ====
5th–8th placings
12 October
Kazakhstan | 4
Bangladesh | 0
12 October
Malaysia | 4
China | 1

5th placing
13 October
Kazakhstan | 0
Malaysia | 5
7th placing
13 October
Bangladesh | 2
China | 1

===== Semifinals =====
12 October
12:00

| Kazakhstan | 4–0 | Bangladesh |

Regional Park Stadium, Hiroshima

12 October
14:00

| Malaysia | 4–1 | China |

Regional Park Stadium, Hiroshima

===== 7th placing =====
13 October
16:00

| Bangladesh | 2–1 | China |

Regional Park Stadium, Hiroshima

===== 5th placing =====
13 October
18:00

| Kazakhstan | 0–5 | Malaysia |

Regional Park Stadium, Hiroshima

==== Final round ====
Semifinals
12 October
Pakistan | 2 (1)
South Korea (p) | 2 (4)
12 October
Japan | 0
India | 1

Final
15 October
South Korea | 3
India | 2
Bronze medal match
15 October
Pakistan | 6
Japan | 0

===== Semifinals =====
12 October
16:00

| Pakistan | 2–2 (a.e.t.) | South Korea |
|---|---|---|
| Bajwa 27'; S. Ahmed 47' | | Park Shin-heum 8'; Kim Young-kyu 62' |
Penalties
| Usman (penalty shoot-out missed); Malik (penalty shoot-out scored); Mahmood (penalty shoot-out missed) | 1–4 | (penalty shoot-out scored) Lee Jeong-sook; (penalty shoot-out scored) Jeon Jong-ha; (penalty shoot-out scored) You Myung-keun; (penalty shoot-out scored) Shin Seok-kyo |

Regional Park Stadium, Hiroshima

12 October
18:00

| Japan | 0–1 | India |
|---|---|---|
| | | Aldrin 14' |

Regional Park Stadium, Hiroshima

===== Bronze medal match =====
15 October
16:00

| Pakistan | 6–0 | Japan |
|---|---|---|
| Shahbaz 22'; Junaid 34'; Khan ?'; Kaleem ?'; Ashraf ?', ?' |

Regional Park Stadium, Hiroshima

===== Final =====
15 October
18:00

| South Korea | 3–2 | India |
|---|---|---|
| Shin Seok-kyo 15'; Park Shin-heum 31', 40' | | Aldrin 7'; Ahmed 46' |

Regional Park Stadium, Hiroshima

==== Final standing ====
| Rank | Team |
|---|---|
| 1st place, gold medalist(s) | South Korea |
| 2nd place, silver medalist(s) | India |
| 3rd place, bronze medalist(s) | Pakistan |
| 4 | Japan |
| 5 | Malaysia |
| 6 | Kazakhstan |
| 7 | Bangladesh |
| 8 | China |
| 9 | Oman |

=== Women ===
| Pos | Team | Pld | W | D | L | GF | GA | GD | Pts |
|---|---|---|---|---|---|---|---|---|---|
| 1 | South Korea | 5 | 5 | 0 | 0 | 20 | 2 | +18 | 10 |
| 2 | Japan | 5 | 3 | 1 | 1 | 11 | 5 | +6 | 7 |
| 3 | China | 5 | 2 | 1 | 2 | 10 | 3 | +7 | 5 |
| 4 | India | 5 | 1 | 2 | 2 | 9 | 6 | +3 | 4 |
| 5 | Uzbekistan | 5 | 1 | 2 | 2 | 7 | 6 | +1 | 4 |
| 6 | Singapore | 5 | 0 | 0 | 5 | 1 | 36 | −35 | 0 |

Source: Results

3 October
14:00

| South Korea | 4–0 | Uzbekistan |

Regional Park Stadium, Hiroshima

3 October
16:00

| China | 8–0 | Singapore |

Regional Park Stadium, Hiroshima

3 October
18:00

| India | 1–1 | Japan |

Regional Park Stadium, Hiroshima

6 October
14:00

| Japan | 8–0 | Singapore |

Regional Park Stadium, Hiroshima

6 October
16:00

| South Korea | 3–0 | India |

Regional Park Stadium, Hiroshima

6 October
18:00

| China | 0–0 | Uzbekistan |

Regional Park Stadium, Hiroshima

9 October
12:00

| India | 1–1 | Uzbekistan |

Regional Park Stadium, Hiroshima

9 October
14:00

| South Korea | 7–1 | Singapore |

Regional Park Stadium, Hiroshima

9 October
16:00

| China | 0–1 | Japan |

Regional Park Stadium, Hiroshima

11 October
14:00

| India | 7–0 | Singapore |

Regional Park Stadium, Hiroshima

11 October
16:00

| Japan | 1–0 | Uzbekistan |

Regional Park Stadium, Hiroshima

11 October
18:00

| South Korea | 2–1 | China |

Regional Park Stadium, Hiroshima

14 October
11:00

| China | 1–0 | India |

Regional Park Stadium, Hiroshima

14 October
13:00

| Uzbekistan | 6–0 | Singapore |

Regional Park Stadium, Hiroshima

14 October
15:00

| South Korea | 4–0 | Japan |

Regional Park Stadium, Hiroshima
