= Field hockey at the 1978 Asian Games =

Field hockey

- Venue: National Stadium
- Dates: 10–19 December
- Nations: 8

Field hockey was contested for men only at the 1978 Asian Games in Bangkok, Thailand.

== Medalists ==
Event	Gold	Silver	Bronze
Men	Pakistan; Munir Bhatti; Rana Ehsanullah; Manzoor-ul-Hassan; Manzoor Hussain; Hanif Khan; Muhammad Saeed Khan; Saeed Ahmed Khan; Samiullah Khan; Nasim Mirza; Akhtar Rasool; Muhammad Shafiq; Shahnaz Sheikh; Saleem Sherwani; Islahuddin Siddiquee; Munawwaruz Zaman; Qamar Zia	India; Mohd Yousuf; Vasudevan Baskaran; Pramod Batlaw; Sylvanus Dung Dung; Merwyn Fernandes; Olympio Fernandes; B. P. Govinda; Sukhbir Singh Grewal; Zafar Iqbal; Ashok Kumar; Victor Philips; Surjit Singh Randhawa; Allan Schofield; Ranbir Singh; Varinder Singh; Surinder Singh Sodhi	Malaysia; Sayuti Abdul Samat; K. Balasingam; Foo Keat Seong; Avtar Singh Gill; Updesh Singh Gill; Awtar Singh Grewal; Razak Leman; Len Oliveiro; K. T. Rajan; Ramakrishnan Rengasamy; V. Ravindran; Mohinder Singh; Savinder Singh; Tam Chiew Seng; Tam Kum Seng; Azraai Zain

== Results ==
=== Preliminary round ===
==== Group A ====
Team	Pld	W	D	L	GF	GA	GD	Pts
Pakistan	3	3	0	0	28	0	+28	6
Japan	3	1	1	1	5	2	+3	3
Thailand	3	0	2	1	2	11	−9	2
Bangladesh	3	0	1	2	2	24	−22	1

10 December

Thailand	2–2	Bangladesh

National Stadium, Bangkok

11 December

Pakistan	2–0	Japan

National Stadium, Bangkok

12 December

Japan	5–0	Bangladesh

National Stadium, Bangkok

13 December

Pakistan	9–0	Thailand

National Stadium, Bangkok

14 December

Japan	0–0	Thailand

National Stadium, Bangkok

15 December

Pakistan	17–0	Bangladesh

National Stadium, Bangkok

==== Group B ====
Team	Pld	W	D	L	GF	GA	GD	Pts
India	3	3	0	0	16	4	+12	6
Malaysia	3	2	0	1	11	5	+6	4
Sri Lanka	3	1	0	2	4	8	−4	2
Hong Kong	3	0	0	3	2	16	−14	0

10 December

Malaysia	6–0	Hong Kong

National Stadium, Bangkok

11 December

India	5–3	Malaysia

National Stadium, Bangkok

12 December

Hong Kong	2–3	Sri Lanka

National Stadium, Bangkok

13 December

India	7–0	Hong Kong

National Stadium, Bangkok

14 December

Malaysia	2–0	Sri Lanka

National Stadium, Bangkok

15 December

India	4–1	Sri Lanka

National Stadium, Bangkok

=== Consolation round ===
Semifinals
16 December
Thailand	0
Hong Kong	2
16 December
Sri Lanka	0
Bangladesh	1

5th place match
18 December
Hong Kong	1
Bangladesh	0
7th place match
18 December
Thailand
Sri Lanka

==== Semifinals ====
16 December

Thailand	0–2	Hong Kong

National Stadium, Bangkok

16 December

Sri Lanka	0–1	Bangladesh

National Stadium, Bangkok

==== 7th place match ====
18 December

Thailand	–	Sri Lanka

National Stadium, Bangkok

==== 5th place match ====
18 December

Hong Kong	1–0	Bangladesh

National Stadium, Bangkok

=== Final round ===
Semifinals
17 December
Pakistan	5
Malaysia	2
17 December
India	2
Japan	0

Final
19 December
Pakistan	1
India	0
Bronze medal match
19 December
Malaysia	2
Japan	1

==== Semifinals ====
17 December

Pakistan	5–2	Malaysia

National Stadium, Bangkok

17 December

India	2–0	Japan

National Stadium, Bangkok

==== Bronze medal match ====
19 December

Malaysia	2–1	Japan

National Stadium, Bangkok

==== Final ====
19 December

Pakistan	1–0	India

National Stadium, Bangkok
