= Kim Su-jeong (field hockey) =

South Korean hockey player

Personal information
- Nationality: South Korean
- Born: 14 June 1974 (age 52)

Sport
- Sport: Field hockey
Medal record
Women's field hockey
Representing South Korea
Asian Games
Gold medal – first place	1994 Hiroshima	Team
Gold medal – first place	1998 Bangkok	Team

Kim Su-jeong (born 14 June 1974) is a former South Korean field hockey player. She competed in the women's tournament at the 2000 Summer Olympics.
