= Long Fengyu =

Chinese field hockey player

Personal information
- Nationality: Chinese
- Born: 25 February 1974 (age 52)

Sport
- Sport: Field hockey
Medal record
Women's field hockey
Representing China
Asian Games
| Gold medal – first place | 2002 Busan | Team |
| Bronze medal – third place | 1998 Bangkok | Team |

Long Fengyu (born 25 February 1974) is a Chinese former field hockey player. She competed in the women's tournament at the 2000 Summer Olympics.
