= Field hockey at the 1998 Asian Games =

- Venues: Kasetsart University, Bangkok; Queen Siritkit Sport Complex, Pathum Thani
- Date: 6–19 December 1998

Field hockey events were contested at the 1998 Asian Games in Bangkok, Thailand. The winner of each tournament qualified for the 2000 Summer Olympics.

== Medalists ==
Event	Gold	Silver	Bronze
Men	India; Anil Alexander Aldrin; Ashish Ballal; Lazarus Barla; Sameer Dad; Baljit Singh Dhillon; Mukesh Kumar; Dhanraj Pillay; Lakshmanan Prabhakaran; Mohammed Riaz; Baljit Singh Saini; Ramandeep Singh; Sandeep Somesh; A. B. Subbaiah; Dilip Tirkey; Thirumal Valavan; Sabu Varkey	South Korea; Cho Myung-jun; Han Beung-kook; Hong Kyung-suep; Jeong Yong-kyun; Jung Jin-dong; Kang Keon-wook; Kim Jung-chul; Kim Yong-bae; Kim Young-kyu; Ko Dong-sik; Koo Jin-soo; Lim Jung-woo; Park Shin-heum; Song Seung-tae; Yeo Woon-kon; Yoo Moon-ki	Pakistan; Sohail Abbas; Babar Abdullah; Anis Ahmed; Waseem Ahmed; Ahmed Alam; Atif Bashir; Haider Hussain; Tariq Imran; Naveed Iqbal; Muhammad Nadeem; Muhammad Qasim; Asad Qureshi; Amir Salim; Muhammad Sarwar; Imran Yousuf; Irfan Yousuf
Women	South Korea; Cho Bo-ra; Choi Kwan-sook; Choi Mi-soon; Kim Eun-jin; Kim Mi-hyun; Kim Myung-ok; Kim Seong-eun; Kim Soo-jung; Kim Tae-seon; Ko Soon-ja; Lee Eun-young; Lee Sun-hwa; Oh Seung-shin; Park Yong-sook; Woo Hyun-jung; Yoo Hee-joo	India; Tingonleima Chanu; Kamla Dalal; Sunita Dalal; Suraj Lata Devi; Sita Gussain; Amandeep Kaur; Manjinder Kaur; Sandeep Kaur; Surinder Kaur; Nidhi Khullar; Jyoti Sunita Kullu; Helen Mary; Neha Singh; Pritam Rani Siwach; Maristella Tirkey	China; Cai Xuemei; Chen Hong; Chen Jing; Chen Zhaoxia; Cheng Hui; Ding Hongping; Fu Baorong; Huang Junxia; Li Shuang; Liu Lijie; Long Fengyu; Nie Yali; Qin Limei; Tang Chunling; Wang Jiuyan; Yang Huiping

== Men's tournament ==
1998 Asian Games
Tournament details
- Host country: Thailand
- City: Bangkok
- Teams: 8

Final positions
- Champions: India (2nd title)
- Runner-up: South Korea
- Third place: Pakistan

=== Groups round ===
==== Group A ====
Pos	Team	Pld	W	D	L	GF	GA	GD	Pts	Qualification
1	Pakistan	4	3	1	0	16	2	+14	10	Semi-final
2	Japan	4	2	2	0	17	4	+13	8	Semi-final
3	Malaysia	4	2	1	1	16	3	+13	7	
4	Hong Kong	4	1	0	3	6	21	−15	3	
5	Thailand (H)	4	0	0	4	0	25	−25	0	

Source: todor66
(H) Hosts

==== Group B ====
Pos	Team	Pld	W	D	L	GF	GA	GD	Pts	Qualification
1	India	4	4	0	0	20	2	+18	12	Semi-final
2	South Korea	4	3	0	1	29	3	+26	9	Semi-final
3	China	4	2	0	2	12	8	+4	6	
4	Singapore	4	0	1	3	2	25	−23	1	
5	Bangladesh	4	0	1	3	1	26	−25	1	

Source: todor66

=== Final round ===
==== Ninth and tenth place classification ====
16 december

Thailand	1–3	Bangladesh

==== Fifth to eighth place classification ====
Crossover
16 December
Malaysia	6
Singapore	0
16 December
China	4
Hong Kong	1

Fifth place
18 December
Malaysia	?
China	?
Seventh place
18 December
Hong Kong	3
Singapore	4

==== Medal round ====
Semi-finals
17 December
Pakistan	2
South Korea	3
17 December
India	3
Japan	1

Final
19 December
South Korea	1 (2)
India (p.s.o.)	1 (4)
Third place
19 December
Pakistan	3
Japan	0

==== Semi-finals ====
17 December

Pakistan	2–3	South Korea
Abbas 5', ?'	Report	Yong-gyun 18'; Woon-kon 26'; Keon-wook 32'

17 December

India	3–1	Japan
Dhillon 17'; R. Singh 29'; Pillay 50'	Report	Katayama 3'

==== Bronze medal match ====
19 December

Pakistan	3–0	Japan
Abbas ?'; Abbas ?'; Nadeem 57'

==== Final ====
19 December

South Korea	1–1 (a.e.t.)	India
Woon-kon 5'	Report	Pillay 23'
Penalties
	2–4

=== Final standings ===
Rank	Team
Gold medal	India
Silver medal	South Korea
Bronze medal	Pakistan
4	Japan
5	Malaysia
6	China
7	Singapore
8	Hong Kong
9	Bangladesh
10	Thailand

== Women's tournament ==
Source: todorr

=== Round-Robin ===
Pos	Team	Pld	W	D	L	GF	GA	GD	Pts
1	South Korea	6	6	0	0	30	4	+26	12
2	India	6	4	1	1	24	9	+15	9
3	Japan	6	4	1	1	16	8	+8	9
4	China	6	3	0	3	21	10	+11	6
5	Uzbekistan	6	1	1	4	5	13	−8	3
6	Kazakhstan	6	1	1	4	6	22	−16	3
7	Thailand	6	0	0	6	0	34	−34	0

=== Matches ===
08 December 1998

India	13–0	Thailand

Queen Sirikit Sports Centre

08 December 1998

South Korea	6–0	Kazakhstan

Queen Sirikit Sports Centre

08 December 1998

Japan	2–1	Uzbekistan

Queen Sirikit Sports Centre

09 December 1998

China	4–1	Uzbekistan

Queen Sirikit Sports Centre

10 December 1998

India	2–1	China

Queen Sirikit Sports Centre

10 December 1998

South Korea	7–0	Thailand

Queen Sirikit Sports Centre

11 December 1998

South Korea	4–2	Japan

Queen Sirikit Sports Centre

11 December 1998

Uzbekistan	0–0	Kazakhstan

Queen Sirikit Sports Centre

12 December 1998

China	8–0	Thailand

Queen Sirikit Sports Centre

12 December 1998

India	2–1	Uzbekistan

Queen Sirikit Sports Centre

13 December 1998

China	5–2	Kazakhstan

Queen Sirikit Sports Centre

13 December 1998

South Korea	5–0	India

Queen Sirikit Sports Centre

13 December 1998

Japan	4–0	Thailand

Queen Sirikit Sports Centre

13 December 1998

Japan	5–1	Kazakhstan

Queen Sirikit Sports Centre

14 December 1998

South Korea	5–0	Uzbekistan

Queen Sirikit Sports Centre

14 December 1998

Uzbekistan	2–0	Thailand

Queen Sirikit Sports Centre

15 December 1998

India	6–1	Kazakhstan

Queen Sirikit Sports Centre

15 December 1998

Japan	2–1	China

Queen Sirikit Sports Centre

16 December 1998

South Korea	3–2	China

Queen Sirikit Sports Centre

16 December 1998

India	1–1	Japan

Queen Sirikit Sports Centre

16 December 1998

Kazakhstan	2–0	Thailand

Queen Sirikit Sports Centre

=== Fifth place play-off ===
18 December 1998

Uzbekistan	5–2	Kazakhstan

Queen Sirikit Sports Centre

=== Bronze medal match ===
18 December 1998

China	2–0	Japan

Queen Sirikit Sports Centre

=== Gold medal match ===
18 December 1998

South Korea	2–1	India

Queen Sirikit Sports Centre

=== Final ranking ===
Rank	Team	Pld	W	D	L	GF	GA	GD	Pts
1	South Korea	7	7	0	0	32	5	+27	14
2	India	7	4	1	2	25	11	+14	9
3	China	7	4	0	3	23	10	+13	8
4	Japan	7	4	1	2	16	10	+6	9
5	Uzbekistan	7	2	1	4	10	15	–5	5
6	Kazakhstan	7	1	1	5	8	27	–19	3
7	Thailand	6	0	0	6	0	34	–34	0
