= Lee Seon-hwa (field hockey) =

South Korean field hockey player

Personal information
- Nationality: South Korean
- Born: 4 June 1974 (age 52)

Sport
- Sport: Field hockey
Medal record
Women's field hockey
Representing South Korea
Asian Games
Gold medal – first place	1998 Bangkok	Team

Lee Seon-hwa (born 4 June 1974) is a South Korean former field hockey player. She competed in the women's tournament at the 2000 Summer Olympics.
