= Lakshmanan Prabhakaran =

Lakshmanan Prabhakaran was a former Indian international field hockey player. He represented India in international competitions from 1993 to 1998. He was part of the team that won gold medal at the 1998 Asian games.
