= Darryl D'Souza =

Indian field hockey player

Sport
- Sport: Field hockey
Medal record
Men's field hockey
Representing India
Asian Games
Silver medal – second place	1990 Beijing	Men's team

Darryl D'Souza (born 21 June 1966) is an Indian field hockey player, who represented India at the 1992 Summer Olympics. Darryl D'Souza is also a silver medalist in the Asian Games, Beijing, 1990. In 1990, he was awarded a Shiv Chhatrapati
