= Lee Seon-yeong =

South Korean hockey player

Personal information
- Nationality: South Korean
- Born: 15 February 1970 (age 56)

Sport
- Sport: Field hockey
Medal record
Women's field hockey
Representing South Korea
Asian Games
Gold medal – first place	1990 Beijing	Team
Gold medal – first place	1994 Hiroshima	Team

Lee Seon-yeong (born 15 February 1970) is a South Korean former field hockey player. She competed in the women's tournament at the 1992 Summer Olympics.
