= Mark Wentges =

American field hockey player

Marcus "Mark" Wentges (born June 22, 1974) is an American former field hockey player who competed in the 1996 Summer Olympics.
