= Shakeel Ahmed (field hockey) =

Indian hockey player (born 1970)

Personal information
- Nationality: India
- Born: 2 November 1970 (age 55) Etawah

Sport
- Sport: Field hockey
Medal record
Representing India
Men's field hockey
Asian Games
Silver medal – second place	1990 Beijing	Team
Silver medal – second place	1994 Hiroshima	Team

Shakeel Ahmed (born 2 November 1970) is an Indian field hockey player. He competed in the 1992 Summer Olympics. He was born in Etawah district of Uttar Pradesh. Currently he is assistant general manager of Air India Lucknow.
