= Yang Huiping =

Chinese field hockey player

Personal information
- Nationality: Chinese
- Born: 16 June 1969 (age 57)

Sport
- Sport: Field hockey
Medal record
Women's field hockey
Representing China
Asian Games
Silver medal – second place	1990 Beijing	Team
Bronze medal – third place	1998 Bangkok	Team
Asia Cup
Bronze medal – third place	1999 New Delhi

Yang Huiping (born 16 June 1969) is a Chinese former field hockey player. She competed in the women's tournament at the 2000 Summer Olympics.
