= Savinder Singh =

Malaysian field hockey player (1938–2026)

Personal information
- Nationality: Malaysian
- Born: 2 June 1938
- Died: 30 October 2026 (aged 88)

Sport
- Sport: Field hockey
Medal record
Men's field hockey
Representing Malaysia
Asian Games
Bronze medal – third place	1974 Tehran	Team
Bronze medal – third place	1978 Bangkok	Team

Savinder Singh (2 June 1938 – 30 October 2026) was a Malaysian field hockey player. He competed in the men's tournament at the 1968 Summer Olympics. Singh died on 30 October 2026, at the age of 88.
