= Yang Hongbing =

Chinese field hockey player

Personal information
- Nationality: Chinese
- Born: 20 January 1967 (age 59)

Sport
- Sport: Field hockey
Medal record
Women's field hockey
Representing China
Asian Games
Silver medal – second place	1990 Beijing	Team

Yang Hongbing (born 20 January 1967) is a Chinese field hockey player. She competed in the women's tournament at the 2000 Summer Olympics.
