= Subbaiah Anjaparavanda =

Indian hockey player

Personal information
- Nationality: Indian
- Born: 8 August 1970 (age 55)

Sport
- Sport: Field hockey

Subbaiah Anjaparavanda (born 8 August 1970) is an Indian field hockey player. He competed in the men's tournament at the 1996 Summer Olympics.
