= Ko Dong-sik =

South Korean field hockey player

- Hangul: 고동식
- RR: Go Dongsik
- MR: Ko Tongsik

Ko Dong-sik
Medal record

Men's field hockey

Representing South Korea

Asian Games
Gold medal – first place	2006 Doha	Team
Silver medal – second place	1998 Bangkok	Team

Ko Dong-sik (born 25 December 1973) is a South Korean field hockey player who competed in the 2004 Summer Olympics and in the 2008 Summer Olympics.
