= You Jae-sook =

South Korean field hockey player

Personal information
- Born: 1968 (age 57–58)
Medal record
Women's field hockey
Representing South Korea
Olympic Games
Silver medal – second place	1996 Atlanta	Team
Asian Games
Gold medal – first place	1994 Hiroshima	Team

You Jae-sook (Korean: 유재숙; born 15 March 1968) is a former field hockey player for South Korea, who won the silver medal with the women's national team at the 1996 Summer Olympics in Atlanta, USA.
