= Nie Yali =

Chinese field hockey player

Personal information
- Born: June 4, 1973 (age 53)
Medal record
Women's field hockey
Representing China
Asian Games
Gold medal – first place	2002 Busan	Team
Gold medal – first place	2006 Doha	Team
Bronze medal – third place	1998 Bangkok	Team
Champions Trophy
Silver medal – second place	2003 Sydney	Team

Nie Yali (simplified Chinese: 聂亚丽; traditional Chinese: 聶亞麗; pinyin: Niè Yàlì; born June 4, 1973, in Da'an, Zigong, Sichuan) is a Chinese field hockey player who competed in the 2000 Summer Olympics and in the 2004 Summer Olympics.

In 2000, she was part of the Chinese team which finished fifth in the women's competition. She played all seven matches as goalkeeper.

Four years later Nie finished fourth with the Chinese team in the women's competition. She played all six matches as goalkeeper.
