= Ahmed Elmaghraby =

American field hockey player (born 1968)

Ahmed Elmaghraby (born April 26, 1968) is a former field hockey forward who finished twelfth with the United States men's national team at the 1996 Summer Olympics in Atlanta, Georgia.
