= Rengasamy Ramakrishnan =

Malaysian field hockey player (born 1953)

Personal information
- Nationality: Malaysian
- Born: 18 June 1953 (age 73)

Sport
- Sport: Field hockey
Medal record
Men's field hockey
Representing Malaysia
Asian Games
Bronze medal – third place	1974 Tehran	Team
Bronze medal – third place	1978 Bangkok	Team

Rengasamy Ramakrishnan (born 18 June 1953) is a Malaysian field hockey player. He competed in the men's tournament at the 1976 Summer Olympics.
