= Kim Eun-jin =

South Korean hockey player (born 1975)

Personal information
- Nationality: South Korean
- Born: 20 April 1975 (age 51)

Sport
- Sport: Field hockey
Medal record
Women's field hockey
Representing South Korea
Asian Games
Gold medal – first place	1998 Bangkok	Team
Silver medal – second place	2002 Busan	Team
Asia Cup
Gold medal – first place	1999 New Delhi

Kim Eun-jin (born 20 April 1975) is a South Korean former field hockey player. She competed in the women's tournament at the 2000 Summer Olympics.
