= Ravi Nayakar =

Indian hockey player

Personal information
- Nationality: Indian
- Born: 22 May 1971 (age 55)

Sport
- Sport: Field hockey
Medal record
Representing India
Men's field hockey
Asian Games
Silver medal – second place	1994 Hiroshima	Team

Ravi Nayakar (born 22 May 1971) is an Indian field hockey player. He competed in the men's tournament at the 1992 Summer Olympics.
