= Jo Bo-ra =

South Korean hockey player (born 1979)

Personal information
- Nationality: South Korean
- Born: 19 December 1979 (age 46)

Sport
- Sport: Field hockey
Medal record
Women's field hockey
Representing South Korea
Asian Games
Gold medal – first place	1998 Bangkok	Team

Jo Bo-ra (born 19 December 1979) is a South Korean former field hockey player. She competed in the women's tournament at the 2000 Summer Olympics.
