= Ahmed Fadzil =

Malaysian field hockey player (born 1959)

Personal information
- Nationality: Malaysian
- Born: 6 June 1959 (age 66)

Sport
- Sport: Field hockey

Ahmed Fadzil (born 6 June 1959) is a Malaysian field hockey player. He competed at the 1984 Summer Olympics and the 1992 Summer Olympics.
