= Rajbir Kaur =

Former Indian hockey player

Personal information
- Nationality: Indian
- Born: 3 May 1965 (age 61) Jalandhar, Punjab, India

Sport
- Country: India
- Sport: Field hockey
Medal record
Women's field hockey
Representing India
Asian Games
Gold medal – first place	1982 Delhi	Team
Bronze medal – third place	1986 Seoul	Team
Asia Cup
Bronze medal – third place	1993 Hiroshima

Rajbir Kaur Rai (born 3 June 1965) is an Indian field hockey player and former Indian women's team captain. She lives in Jallandhar. In her days, she was popular as the 'Golden Girl' of Indian hockey. She received Arjuna Award in 1984.

== Early life ==
She was born in Jallandhar. She did her schooling in the Government Senior Secondary in Nehru Garden, Jalandhar and completed her degree at Lyallpur Khala College for Women, Jalandhar. She is married to Olympian Gurmail Singh.

== Hockey career ==
Rajbir Kaur, is the only Indian woman hockey player who played four Asian Games, She also took part in three Asia Cups and many other tournaments for India from 1981 to 1993.

== Politics ==
In June 2016, Rajbir Kaur joined Aam Aadmi Party in Chandigarh. In 2020, she supported the agitating farmers in Haryana.
