= Huang Junxia =

Chinese field hockey player

Personal information
- Born: October 9, 1975 (age 50) Panshi, Jilin City
Medal record
Women's field hockey
Representing China
Olympic Games
Silver medal – second place	2008 Beijing	Team
Asian Games
Gold medal – first place	2002 Busan	Team
Gold medal – first place	2006 Doha	Team
Bronze medal – third place	1994 Hiroshima	Team
Bronze medal – third place	1998 Bangkok	Team
Asia Cup
Bronze medal – third place	2007 Hong Kong
Champions Trophy
Silver medal – second place	2003 Sydney

Huang Junxia (simplified Chinese: 黄俊霞; traditional Chinese: 黃俊霞; pinyin: Huáng Jùnxiá; born October 9, 1975, in Panshi, Jilin City, Jilin) is a female Chinese field hockey player who competed in the 2000 Summer Olympics and in the 2004 Summer Olympics.

In 2000, she was part of the Chinese team which finished fifth in the women's competition. She played all seven matches.

Four years later she finished fourth with the Chinese team in the women's competition. She played all six matches.
