= Irfan Yousaf =

Pakistani field hockey player (born 1980)

Personal information
- Nationality: Pakistani
- Born: 25 February 1980 (age 46)

Sport
- Sport: Field hockey

Irfan Yousaf (born 25 February 1980) is a Pakistani field hockey player. He competed in the men's tournament at the 2000 Summer Olympics.
