= Kim Yoon =

Korean field hockey player

Medal record

Men's field hockey

Representing South Korea

Olympic Games
| Silver medal – second place | 2000 Sydney | Team |

Asian Games
| Gold medal – first place | 1994 Hiroshima | Team |
| Gold medal – first place | 2002 Busan | Team |

Champions Trophy
| Silver medal – second place | 1999 Brisbane | Team |
| Bronze medal – third place | 2000 Amstelveen | Team |

Kim Yoon (born 14 April 1974) is a South Korean former field hockey goalkeeper who competed in the 1996 Summer Olympics and in the 2000 Summer Olympics.
