= Kim Yeong-gwi =

South Korean hockey player

Personal information
- Nationality: South Korean
- Born: 11 April 1969 (age 57)

Sport
- Sport: Field hockey
Medal record
Men's field hockey
Representing South Korea
Asian Games
Gold medal – first place	1994 Hiroshima	Team
Silver medal – second place	1998 Bangkok	Team

Kim Yeong-gwi (born 11 April 1969), also known as Kim Young-kyu, is a South Korean field hockey player. He competed in the men's tournament at the 1996 Summer Olympics.
