= Jeong Yong-gyun =

South Korean hockey player

Personal information
- Nationality: South Korean
- Born: 13 August 1971 (age 54)

Sport
- Sport: Field hockey
Medal record
Men's field hockey
Representing South Korea
Asian Games
Gold medal – first place	1994 Hiroshima	Team
Silver medal – second place	1998 Bangkok	Team

Jeong Yong-gyun (born 13 August 1971) is a South Korean field hockey player. He competed in the men's tournament at the 1996 Summer Olympics.
