= Sanjeev Kumar (field hockey) =

Indian field hockey player

Personal information
- Nationality: Indian
- Born: 4 October 1969 (age 57)

Sport
- Sport: Field hockey
Medal record
Representing India
Men's field hockey
Asian Games
Silver medal – second place	1994 Hiroshima	Team

Sanjeev Kumar Dang (born 4 October 1969) is an Indian field hockey player. He competed in the men's tournament at the 1996 Summer Olympics.
