= Gurmail Singh (field hockey, born 1959) =

Indian field hockey player

Olympic medal record

Men's Field Hockey

Olympic Games
| Gold medal – first place | 1980 Moscow | Team |

Asian Games
| Silver medal – second place | 1982 Delhi | Team |

Champions Trophy
| Bronze medal – third place | 1982 Amstelveen | |

Gurmail Singh (born 10 December 1959) is a former Indian field hockey player. He was part of the Indian hockey team that won the gold medal in 1980 Summer Olympics at Moscow. He is currently an officer in the Punjab Police. He is an Arjuna Award winner. He is married to Rajbir Kaur, a former captain of women's Indian hockey team.
