= Gu Jin-su =

South Korean hockey player

Personal information
- Nationality: South Korean
- Born: 3 January 1968 (age 58)

Sport
- Sport: Field hockey
Medal record
Men's field hockey
Representing South Korea
Asian Games
Gold medal – first place	1994 Hiroshima	Team
Silver medal – second place	1998 Bangkok	Team

Gu Jin-su (born 3 January 1968) is a South Korean field hockey player. He competed in the men's tournament at the 1996 Summer Olympics.
