= Dharam Singh (field hockey, born 1937) =

Indian field hockey player

Personal information
- Nationality: Indian
- Born: 30 October 1937 (age 88)

Sport
- Sport: Field hockey
Medal record
Representing India
Olympic Games
Gold medal – first place	1964 Tokyo	Team competition
Asian Games
Gold medal – first place	1966 Bangkok	Team competition

Dharam Singh (born 30 October 1937) is an Indian field hockey player. He competed in the men's tournament at the 1964 Summer Olympics, and was part of team that won the gold medal.
