= Madhu Yadav =

Indian field hockey player

Medal record
Women's field hockey
Representing India
Asian Games
Bronze medal – third place	1986 Seoul	Team competition

Madhu Yadav is former captain of the India women's national field hockey team. She is a 1986 Asian Games bronze-medallist. She has also received the Arjuna Award in 2000 from the President of India. She has also coached the team after her retirement. She is from Jabalpur, Madhya Pradesh. She is a recipient of the Vikram Award from the Government of Madhya Pradesh.
