= Abdul Rashid Al-Hasan =

Pakistani field hockey player

Personal information
- Born: April 14, 1959 (age 67) Gojra, Punjab
Medal record
Men's field hockey
Representing Pakistan
Olympic Games
Gold medal – first place	1984 Los Angeles	Team
Junior World Cup
Gold medal – first place	1979 Versailles	Team

Abdul Rashid Al-Hasan (born 14 April 1959) is a former field hockey player from Pakistan. He won the gold medal in the 1984 Summer Olympics.
