= Khawaja Junaid =

Pakistani field hockey player (born 1966)

Medal record

Representing Pakistan

Men's Field hockey

Olympic Games
Bronze medal – third place	1992 Barcelona	Team

Khawaja Muhammad Junaid (born 14 April 1966) is a Pakistani field hockey coach and former player. He won the gold medal in the field hockey tournament at the 1990 Asian Games, when Pakistan beat India 3–2 in the final, and a bronze medal at the 1992 Summer Olympics in Barcelona.

Later in his career, Junaid became the head coach of the Pakistan hockey team. He coached the team at the 2017 World Hockey League in London, but was sacked after lashing out at the PHF president and secretary. He returned as head coach of the team for the 2020 Olympic Games in Tokyo, Japan.
