= Qamar Zia =

Pakistani field hockey player (born 1954)

Zia Qamar
Personal information
- Born: 15 January 1954 (age 72)
Medal record
Men's field hockey
Representing Pakistan
Olympic Games
Bronze medal – third place	1976 Montreal	Team competition

Qamar Zia (born 15 January 1954) is a former field hockey goalkeeper from Pakistan Men's National Hockey Team. He won the bronze medal in 1976 Summer Olympics in Montreal, Quebec, Canada. He also won 1994 Men's Hockey World Cup with Pakistan. He Belongs to Arain family of Sahiwal.
