= Anil Aldrin =

Indian field hockey player (born 1971)

Anil Alexander Aldrin
Personal information
- Nationality: Indian
- Born: 22 August 1971 (age 54)

Sport
- Sport: Field hockey

Medal record

Representing India

Men's field hockey

Asian Games
Silver medal – second place	1994 Hiroshima	Team
Gold medal – first place	1998 Bangkok	Team

Anil Alexander Aldrin (born 22 August 1971) is a former Indian hockey player who played for the India national field hockey team. His family hailed from Kerala in a place named Murukanpuzha in Trivandrum. He played as a defender for India from 1992 to 1999 and captained the country during his last years in 1999. He competed in the men's tournament at the 1996 Summer Olympics at Atlanta. He also played in the Asian Games in 1994 and 1998, winning the gold in his second appearance at Bangkok, and he represented India in Champions Trophy in 1995 and 1996 at home in Madras. He also played two World Cups in 1994 in Sydney and under coach Vasudevan Baskaran in 1998 at Utrecht, the Netherlands. He serves as the Sports Director at Vidyashilp Academy, Bengaluru, India.

== Career ==
Aldrin had his schooling at St. Joseph's Boys High School in Bangalore and started his hockey career after joining the Sports Authority of India hostel for boys under well-known coach P. A. Rafael. He also completed his B.Com from St. Joseph's College, Bangalore. Anil Aldrin and Sandeep Somesh were in the class of 1988 at St. Joseph's school, along with Indian cricket player Rahul Dravid, who also played hockey in his school days. Later, in his playing days, Aldrin was compared to Rahul Dravid and was called as the `Wall of Indian hockey' for his defending skills. Other hockey players who went on to play for India, like Sabu Varkey, Sandeep Somesh and Ravi Nayakkar, were his teammates in the hostel under the same coach. In the 1990s he was recruited by Indian Airlines which later became known as Air India, one of the top domestic outfits in India. In 2022, Aldrin secured a formidable leadership role at the prestigious Vidyashilp Academy, training and leading over 2,500 young athletes.
