= Eliza Nelson =

Indian field hockey player

Personal information
- Born: 27 September 1956 (age 69) Pune, Maharashtra, India
- Occupation: Field hockey player
Medal record
Women's field hockey
Representing India
Asian Games
Gold medal – first place	1982 Delhi	Team competition

Eliza Nelson, née Eliza Mendonca (born 27 September 1956), is an Indian field hockey player and a former captain of the women's national field hockey team of India. She received the Arjuna Award in 1981 and the Government of India awarded her the fourth highest Indian civilian honour of Padma Shri in 1983.

== Family ==
Eliza was born in a Goan family at Pune, Maharashtra. She has two brothers, Augustine and Felix, and two sisters, Irene and Salome. She married Darryl, a hockey player from Kerala, and lives a retired life in Pune. She has two daughters. Andrea is a director of a pharma firm in the US and Rebecca is a fashion designer in Mumbai.

== Career ==
Eliza Nelson joined the Western Railway hockey team in 1977. And she played for the Indian Railways She led the Indian national team that won the gold medal at the 9th Asian Games held at New Delhi in 1982. She was also a member of the team that secured fourth place at the Moscow 1980 Summer Olympics. In 2001, she became the Sports Officer of Central Railway.

== See also ==
- India women's national field hockey team
- 1980 Summer Olympics
- 1982 Asian Games
