= Varsha Soni =

Indian field hockey player

Medal record
Women's field hockey
Representing India
Asian Games
| Gold medal – first place | 1982 Delhi | Team competition |

Varsha Soni (from Jaipur, Rajasthan) was a member of the Indian Women's Hockey Team. She was raised in Jaipur, Rajasthan and is the youngest of 7 sisters and 1 brother. She studied at University Maharani College, University of Rajasthan, Jaipur. She started her career in Field Hockey at an early age and eventually made it onto the Indian national team where she represented India at the 1980 Summer Olympics and the 1982 Asian Games. She worked for the Indian Railways in Jaipur and is also a recipient of the Arjuna Award.
