= Muhammad Qasim (field hockey) =

Pakistani hockey player

Muhammad Qasim (1974–2006) was a field hockey player from Pakistan who represented the country internationally, including at the Olympics. Qasim started his career in the 1998 world cup, represented Pakistan in the 2000 Sydney Olympic as well as two Commonwealth games - as well as other events. Qasim who earned 81 caps for Pakistan, made his last international appearance at the 2004 Azlan Shah Cup.

== Death ==
Qasim was diagnosed with abdominal cancer whilst receiving treatment after suffering injuries during training. Initially he received treatment at the Shaukat Khanum Memorial Hospital in Lahore but was transferred to the United States for further treatment - however he was unable to recover. Qasim died at the age of 32 and was buried in his hometown of Gojra on 26 October 2006.
