= Cheng Hui (field hockey) =

Chinese field hockey player (born 1972)

Personal information
- Born: December 23, 1972 (age 53) Zigong, Sichuan
Medal record
Women's field hockey
Representing China
Olympic Games
Silver medal – second place	2008 Beijing	Team
Asian Games
Gold medal – first place	2002 Busan	Team
Bronze medal – third place	1998 Bangkok	Team
Champions Trophy
Silver medal – second place	2003 Sydney	Team

Cheng Hui (simplified Chinese: 程晖; traditional Chinese: 程暉; pinyin: Chéng Huī; born December 23, 1972, in Zigong, Sichuan) is a female Chinese former field hockey player who competed in the 2000, 2004, and 2008 Summer Olympics.

In 2000, she was part of the Chinese team which finished fifth in the women's competition. She played all seven matches and scored one goal.

In 2004, she finished fourth with the Chinese team in the women's competition. She again played all six matches.

Four years later in 2008, she was part of the Chinese team which won the silver medal, losing to the Netherlands in the final.
