= Yu Hui-ju =

South Korean hockey player (born 1976)

Personal information
- Nationality: South Korean
- Born: 8 May 1976 (age 50)

Sport
- Sport: Field hockey
Medal record
Women's field hockey
Representing South Korea
Asian Games
Gold medal – first place	1998 Bangkok	Team
Silver medal – second place	2002 Busan	Team

Yu Hui-ju (born 8 May 1976) is a South Korean former field hockey player. She competed at the 2000 Summer Olympics and the 2004 Summer Olympics.
