= Park Sin-heung =

South Korean hockey player

Personal information
- Nationality: South Korean
- Born: 9 November 1968 (age 57)

Sport
- Sport: Field hockey
Medal record
Men's field hockey
Representing South Korea
Asian Games
Gold medal – first place	1994 Hiroshima	Team
Silver medal – second place	1998 Bangkok	Team

Park Sin-heung (born 9 November 1968) is a South Korean field hockey player.

== Career ==
He competed in the men's tournament at the 1996 Summer Olympics.
