= Kim Jong-i =

South Korean field hockey player

Personal information
- Nationality: South Korean
- Born: 10 January 1973 (age 53)

Sport
- Sport: Field hockey
Medal record
Men's field hockey
Representing South Korea
Asian Games
Gold medal – first place	1994 Hiroshima	Team

Kim Jong-i (born 10 January 1973) is a South Korean field hockey player. He competed in the men's tournament at the 1996 Summer Olympics.
