= Munir Bhatti =

Pakistani field hockey player (died 2024)

Personal information
- Died: 27 September 2024 Rawalpindi, Pakistan

Sport
- Sport: Field hockey
Medal record
Men's field hockey
Representing Pakistan
Hockey World Cup
Gold medal – first place	1978 Buenos Aires	Team
Asian Games
Gold medal – first place	1978 Bangkok	Team

Munir Bhatti (Urdu: منیر بھٹی; died 27 September 2024) was a Pakistani field hockey player who was a member of the Pakistan National Hockey Team from 1978 to 1979. He was born in Sialkot, Pakistan. A half back, he was capped by Pakistan 13 times, scoring no goals. Bhatti died from cancer in Rawalpindi on 27 September 2024.
