= Cho Myung-jun =

South Korean field hockey player

- Hangul: 조명준
- RR: Jo Myeongjun
- MR: Cho Myŏngjun

Cho Myung-jun
Medal record

Men's field hockey

Representing South Korea

Asian Games
Gold medal – first place	1994 Hiroshima	Team
Silver medal – second place	1998 Bangkok	Team

Cho Myung-jun (born July 29, 1970) is a South Korean field hockey coach. At the 2012 Summer Olympics he coached the South Korea national field hockey team.
