= Yu Myeong-gun =

South Korean hockey player

Personal information
- Nationality: South Korean
- Born: 27 April 1971 (age 55)

Sport
- Sport: Field hockey
Medal record
Men's field hockey
Representing South Korea
Asian Games
Gold medal – first place	1994 Hiroshima	Team

Yu Myeong-gun (born 27 April 1971) is a South Korean field hockey player. He competed in the men's tournament at the 1996 Summer Olympics.
