= Saleem Sherwani (field hockey goalkeeper) =

Pakistani field hockey player (born 1951)

Personal information
- Born: 4 January 1951 (age 75)
- Height: 183 cm (6 ft 0 in)
- Weight: 73 kg (161 lb)
Medal record
Men's field hockey
Representing Pakistan
Olympic Games
Silver medal – second place	1972 Munich	Team competition
Bronze medal – third place	1976 Montreal	Team competition
Asian Games
Gold medal – first place	1970 Bangkok	Team competition
Gold medal – first place	1974 Tehran	Team competition

Saleem Sherwani (Urdu: ﺳﻠﯿﻢ ﺷﻴﺮوﺍﻧﻰ; born 4 January 1951) is a former field hockey goalkeeper from Pakistan Men's National Hockey Team. He won the silver medal at the 1972 Summer Olympics in Munich, Germany and bronze medal in 1976 Summer Olympics in Montreal, Quebec, Canada.

His active years were from 1969 to 1979. He was capped 91 times during his career.

== See also ==
- Pakistan Hockey Federation
