= Hong Gyeong-seop =

South Korean hockey player

Personal information
- Nationality: South Korean
- Born: 21 April 1971 (age 55)

Sport
- Sport: Field hockey
Medal record
Men's field hockey
Representing South Korea
Asian Games
| Silver medal – second place | 1998 Bangkok | Team |

Hong Gyeong-seop (born 21 April 1971) is a South Korean field hockey player. He competed in the men's tournament at the 1996 Summer Olympics.
