= S. Omana Kumari =

Indian field hockey player

Medal record
Women's field hockey
Representing India
Asian Games
Gold medal – first place	1982 Delhi	Team competition
Bronze medal – third place	1986 Seoul	Team competition

S. Omana Kumari was an Indian professional field hockey player who played for India's women's national field hockey team from 1975 to 1986. She is a recipient of the Arjuna Award, for her contribution to Indian Field Hockey.

== Achievements in hockey ==
- Represented India from 1975 to 1986
- Represented Kerala from 1972 to 1979
- From 1980 to 1987, played for Indian Railways

=== Junior Nationals: (Representing Kerala) ===
- 1972 Pune : Gold Medal
- 1975 Sangrur( Pepsu) : Bronze Medal
- 1974 Trivandrum : Gold Medal
- 1975 Ahmedabad

=== Senior Nationals : (Representing Kerala) ===
- 1973 Bhopal
- 1974 Jaipur
- 1975 Ahmedabad
- 1976 Pune
- 1977 Bangalore
- 1978 Goa

=== Representing Indian Railways ===
- 1980 Indore : Gold Medal
- 1981 Ahmedabad : Gold Medal
- 1982 Kozhikode : Gold Medal
- 1983 Shimla : Gold Medal
- 1984 Bangalore : Gold Medal
- 1985 Kapurthala : Gold Medal (CAPTAIN)
- 1986 Trivandrum : Gold Medal

=== South Zone Nationals ===
- 1976 Palayamkotu : Gold Medal
- 1978 Trivandrum : Gold Medal

=== National Games : (played for Maharashtra) ===
- 1980 Jaipur 3rd position
- 1981 Maharastra

=== International Achievements ===
- 1975 Begum Razool International Hockey Tournament Madras : Gold Medal
- 1979 Pre Olympics : Moscow
- 1980 Indo Russian Test Series in Russia : India
- 1981 Asian Championship : Japan Gold Medal
- 1981 PestaSykam Quadrangular Hockey Tournament – Japan(tentri) : Gold Medal
- 1982 9th Asian Games New Delhi : Gold Medal
- 1982 Begum Razool Hockey Tournament New Delhi : Gold Medal
- 1982 Indira Gandhi International Hockey Tournament : Gold Medal
- 1983 World Cup Hockey Tournament Malaysia
- 1983 Indo-German Test Series in Germany and India
- 1984 Indo-China Test Series China
- 1985 Inter Continent Cup Argentina
- 1985 Indira Gandhi International Hockey Tournament : Gold Medal
- 1986 10th Asian Games : Bronze Medal

== Awards ==
- 1980 : G.V. Raja Award (Kerala)
- 1988 : ChathrapathiShivaji Award Maharashtra
- 1998 : Arjuna Award (Govt. Of INDIA)
