= Field hockey at the 2000 Summer Olympics – Women's tournament =

Women's field hockey at the 2000 Summer Olympics
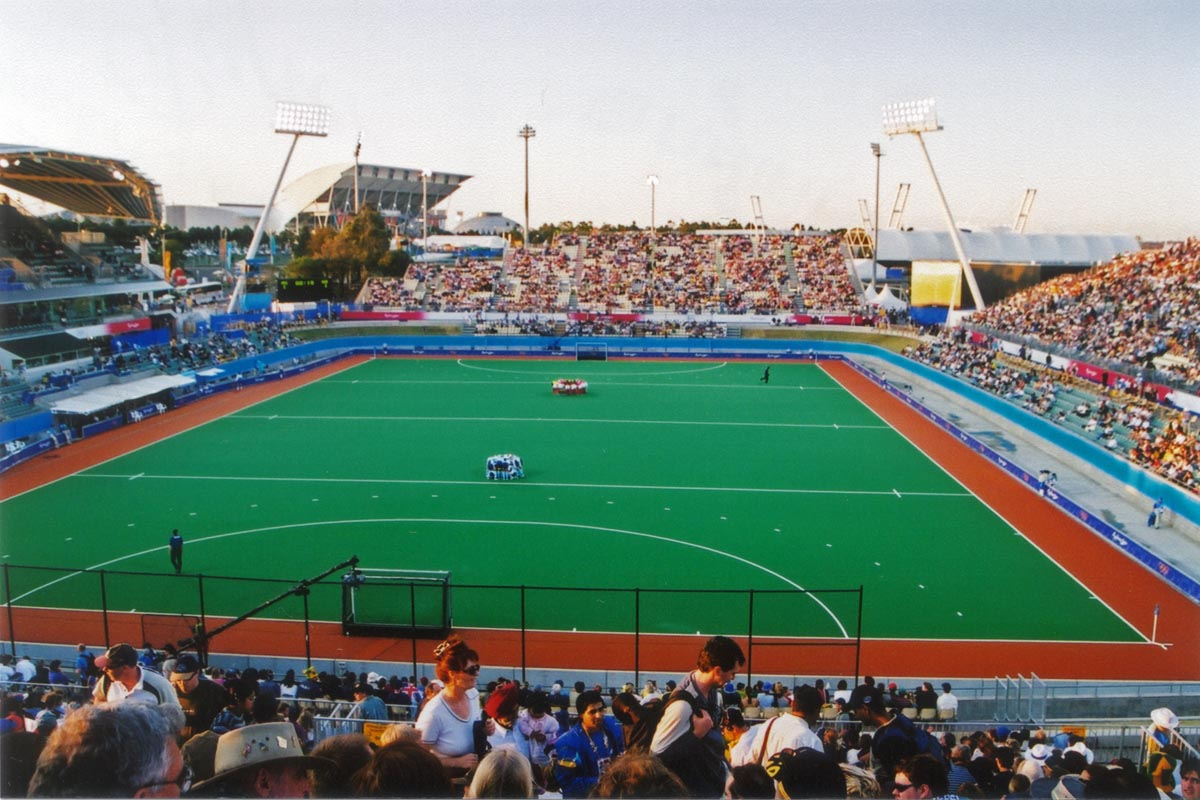
- Sydney Olympic Park Hockey Centre

Tournament details
- Host country: Australia
- City: Sydney
- Dates: 16 – 29 September
- Teams: 10
- Venue: Sydney Olympic Park Hockey Centre

Final positions
- Champions: Australia (3rd title)
- Runner-up: Argentina
- Third place: Netherlands

Tournament statistics
- Matches played: 35
- Goals scored: 112 (3.2 per match)
- Top scorer: (Australia) Nikki Hudson (6 goals)

The women's field hockey tournament at the 2000 Summer Olympics was the 6th edition of the field hockey event for women at the Summer Olympic Games. It was held over a fourteen-day period beginning on 16 September, and culminating with the medal finals on 29 September. All games were played at the hockey centre within the Olympic Park in Sydney, Australia.

Defending champions Australia won the gold medal for the third time after defeating Argentina 3–1 in the final. The Netherlands won the bronze medal by defeating Spain 2–0.

== Qualification ==
Each of the continental champions from five federations and the host nation received an automatic berth. Along with the teams qualifying through the Olympic Qualification Tournament, ten teams competed in this tournament.

Dates	Event	Location	Qualifier(s)
Host nation			Australia
8–18 December 1998	1998 Asian Games	Bangkok, Thailand	South Korea
24 July – 4 August 1999	1999 Pan American Games	Winnipeg, Canada	Argentina
11–18 September 1999	1999 All-Africa Games	Johannesburg, South Africa	South Africa
17–21 September 1999	1999 Oceania Cup	Sydney, Australia	—^{1}
18–29 September 1999	1999 EuroHockey Nations Championship	Cologne, Germany	Netherlands
24 March – 2 April 2000	Olympic Qualification Tournament	Milton Keynes, England	New Zealand; Great Britain; Germany; Spain; China

^1 – Australia qualified both as host and continental champion, therefore that quota was added to the ones awarded by the Olympic Qualification Tournament to a total of 5.

== Results ==
All times are Eastern Daylight Time (UTC+11:00)

=== First round ===
==== Pool A ====
Pos	Team	Pld	W	D	L	GF	GA	GD	Pts	Qualification
1	Australia	4	3	1	0	9	3	+6	10	Medal round
2	Argentina	4	2	0	2	5	6	−1	6	Medal round
3	Spain	4	1	2	1	2	3	−1	5	Medal round
4	Great Britain	4	1	1	2	5	5	0	4	
5	South Korea	4	0	2	2	4	8	−4	2	

Source: FIH
Rules for classification: 1) Points; 2) Matches won; 3) Goal difference; 4) Goals for; 5) Head-to-head result.

16 September 2000
08:30

South Korea	2–3	Argentina
Shin 20'; Cho 33'	Report	Masotta 9'; Aymar 44'; Rimoldi 68'

Umpires:
Gina Spitaleri (ITA)
Miriam van Gemert (NED)

17 September 2000
15:30

Australia	2–1	Great Britain
Hudson 18'; Powell 51'	Report	Marston-Smith 47'

Umpires:
Ute Conen (GER)
Marelize de Klerk (RSA)

17 September 2000
18:30

South Korea	0–0	Spain
	Report

Umpires:
Lyn Farrell (NZL)
Jean Buchanan (RSA)

18 September 2000
18:30

Great Britain	0–1	Argentina
	Report	Masotta 14'

Umpires:
Renee Cohen (NED)
Gina Spitaleri (ITA)

19 September 2000
15:30

Australia	1–1	Spain
Annan 7'	Report	De Ignacio-Simo 2'

Umpires:
Lyn Farrell (NZL)
Miriam van Gemert (NED)

20 September 2000
10:30

South Korea	2–2	Great Britain
Kim Se. 14'; Kim E. 48'	Report	Clewlow 57'; Nicholson 66'

Umpires:
Ute Conen (GER)
Jean Buchanan (RSA)

20 September 2000
20:30

Australia	3–1	Argentina
Morris 25'; Starre 33'; Mitchell-Taverner 63'	Report	García 66'

Umpires:
Renee Cohen (NED)
Miriam van Gemert (NED)

21 September 2000
20:30

Argentina	0–1	Spain
	Report	Goikoetxea 40'

Umpires:
Marelize de Klerk (RSA)
Kazuko Yasueda (JPN)

22 September 2000
15:30

Australia	3–0	South Korea
Powell 8'; Peek 22'; Hudson 70+'	Report

Umpires:
Renee Cohen (NED)
Ute Conen (GER)

22 September 2000
20:30

Great Britain	2–0	Spain
Clewlow 48'; Cullen 65'	Report

Umpires:
Jean Buchanan (RSA)
Marelize de Klerk (RSA)

==== Pool B ====
Pos	Team	Pld	W	D	L	GF	GA	GD	Pts	Qualification
1	New Zealand	4	2	1	1	7	5	+2	7	Medal round
2	China	4	2	0	2	4	5	−1	6	Medal round
3	Netherlands	4	1	2	1	9	9	0	5	Medal round
4	Germany	4	1	2	1	6	6	0	5	
5	South Africa	4	1	1	2	4	5	−1	4	

Source: FIH
Rules for classification: 1) Points; 2) Matches won; 3) Goal difference; 4) Goals for; 5) Head-to-head result.

16 September 2000
10:30

Germany	1–1	New Zealand
Lätzsch 56'	Report	Smith 68'

Umpires:
Michele Arnold (AUS)
Gill Clarke (GBR)

17 September 2000
13:30

Netherlands	1–2	China
Teeuwen 69'	Report	Yang 16', 39'

Umpires:
Renee Chatas (USA)
Angela Lario (ESP)

17 September 2000
20:30

Germany	2–1	South Africa
Rinne 28'; Becker 50'	Report	Agliotti 7'

Umpires:
Lee Mi-ok (KOR)
Kazuko Yasueda (JPN)

18 September 2000
20:30

China	0–2	New Zealand
	Report	Trolove 11'; Bell-Kake 38'

Umpires:
Judith Barnesby (AUS)
Michele Arnold (AUS)

19 September 2000
13:30

Netherlands	2–2	South Africa
Boomgaardt 12'; Smabers 16'	Report	Coetzee 52'; Dare 61'

Umpires:
Kazuko Yasueda (JPN)
Gill Clarke (GBR)

20 September 2000
08:30

Germany	1–2	China
Möller 60'	Report	Zhou 2'; Cheng 49'

Umpires:
Renee Chatas (USA)
Lee Mi-ok (KOR)

20 September 2000
18:30

Netherlands	4–3	New Zealand
Van der Vaart 6'; Boomgaardt 18'; Van der Wielen 45'; Van de Kieft 69'	Report	Lawrence 23', 63'; Senior 58'

Umpires:
Angela Lario (ESP)
Gina Spitaleri (ITA)

21 September 2000
18:30

New Zealand	1–0	South Africa
Smith 54'	Report

Umpires:
Judith Barnesby (AUS)
Lee Mi-ok (KOR)

22 September 2000
13:30

Netherlands	2–2	Germany
Van der Wielen 31'; Thate 49'	Report	Rinne 32'; Ernsting-Krienke 66'

Umpires:
Judith Barnesby (AUS)
Renee Chatas (USA)

22 September 2000
18:30

China	0–1	South Africa
	Report	Geyser 52'

Umpires:
Angela Lario (ESP)
Gill Clarke (GBR)

=== Seventh to tenth place classification ===
Crossover
25 September 2000
Great Britain	3
South Africa	2
25 September 2000
South Korea	2
Germany (a.e.t.)	3

Seventh place
27 September 2000
Great Britain	0
Germany	2
Ninth place
27 September 2000
South Africa	0
South Korea	3

==== Crossover ====
25 September 2000
10:30

Great Britain	3–2	South Africa
Simpson 3'; Clewlow 12'; Smith 38'	Report	Dare 6'; Coetzee 31'

Umpires:
Renee Chatas (USA)
Angela Lario (ESP)

25 September 2000
15:30

South Korea	2–3 (a.e.t.)	Germany
Lee E. 56'; Kim E. 59'	Report	Becker 8', 41'; Ernsting-Krienke 80'

Umpires:
Michele Arnold (USA)
Jean Buchanan (RSA)

==== Ninth and tenth place ====
27 September 2000
08:30

South Africa	0–3	South Korea
	Report	Kim E. 23', 26'; Yoo 35+'

Umpires:
Michele Arnold (AUS)
Renee Cohen (NED)

==== Seventh and eighth place ====
27 September 2000
13:00

Great Britain	0–2	Germany
	Report	Keller 21'; Becker 52'

Umpires:
Miriam van Gemert (NED)
Lyn Farrell (NZL)

=== Medal round ===
==== Pool C ====
Pos	Team	Pld	W	D	L	GF	GA	GD	Pts	Qualification
1	Australia	5	4	1	0	17	3	+14	13	Gold medal match
2	Argentina	5	3	0	2	13	7	+6	9	Gold medal match
3	Netherlands	5	2	0	3	8	14	−6	6	Bronze medal match
4	Spain	5	1	3	1	5	5	0	6	Bronze medal match
5	China	5	1	1	3	4	10	−6	4	
6	New Zealand	5	1	1	3	8	16	−8	4	

Source: FIH
Rules for classification: 1) Points; 2) Matches won; 3) Goal difference; 4) Goals for; 5) Head-to-head result.

China and New Zealand finished fifth and sixth respectively in this tournament.

24 September 2000
11:00

Spain	0–0	China
	Report

Umpires:
Gina Spitaleri (ITA)
Marelize de Klerk (RSA)

24 September 2000
14:00

Argentina	3–1	Netherlands
Aymar 3'; García 26', 50'	Report	Smabers 12'

Umpires:
Kazuko Yasueda (JPN)
Ute Conen (GER)

24 September 2000
16:00

Australia	3–0	New Zealand
Hudson 50', 52'; Powell 62'	Report

Umpires:
Gill Clarke (GBR)
Lee Mi-ok (KOR)

25 September 2000
13:30

Argentina	2–1	China
Aymar 35+'; García 52'	Report	Tang 6'

Umpires:
Lyn Farrell (NZL)
Renee Cohen (NED)

25 September 2000
18:30

Australia	5–0	Netherlands
Annan 35+', 65'; Hawkes 37'; Powell 40'; Morris 30+'	Report

Umpires:
Kazuko Yasueda (JPN)
Gina Spitaleri (ITA)

25 September 2000
20:30

Spain	2–2	New Zealand
Barrio 13'; Camón 70+'	Report	Smith 46'; Trolove 60'

Umpires:
Miriam van Gemert (NED)
Gill Clarke (GBR)

27 September 2000
11:00

Spain	1–2	Netherlands
De Ignacio-Simo 68'	Report	Van der Wielen 28', 63'

Umpires:
Lee Mi-ok (KOR)
Ute Conen (GER)

27 September 2000
16:30

Argentina	7–1	New Zealand
Rognoni 9', 47'; Oneto 12', 40', 42', 49'; Masotta 31'	Report	Bell-Kake 33'

Umpires:
Judith Barnesby (AUS)
Kazuko Yasueda (JPN)

27 September 2000
18:30

Australia	5–1	China
Hudson 2', 28'; Towers 9'; Morris 42'; Mitchell-Taverner 48'	Report	Yang 45'

Umpires:
Gill Clarke (GBR)
Marelize de Klerk (RSA)

==== Bronze medal match ====
29 September 2000
17:30

Netherlands	2–0	Spain
Boomgaardt 10'; Thate 55'	Report

Umpires:
Gill Clarke (GBR)
Gina Spitaleri (ITA)

==== Gold medal match ====
29 September 2000
20:00

Australia	3–1	Argentina
Annan 10'; Haslam 26'; Morris 38'	Report 1 Report 2	Oneto 44'

Umpires:
Miriam van Gemert (NED)
Kazuko Yasueda (JPN)

Team details

Australia
Argentina

GK	17	Rachel Imison
DF	24	Angie Skirving
DF	11	Katie Allen
DF	13	Lisa Carruthers
MF	4	Alyson Annan
MF	14	Rechelle Hawkes (c)
MF	28	Julie Towers
MF	10	Kate Starre
FW	30	Jenn Morris
FW	32	Nikki Hudson
FW	29	Renita Garard
Substitutions:
	5	Juliet Haslam	(substituted on) 11'
	7	Alison Peek	(substituted on) 15'
	9	Claire Mitchell	(substituted on) 8'
	31	Katrina Powell	(substituted on) 7'
Manager:
(Australia) Robert Haigh

GK	1	Mariela Antoniska
DF	6	Ayelén Stepnik
DF	3	Magdalena Aicega
DF	16	Cecilia Rognoni
MF	4	María Paz Ferrari
MF	8	Luciana Aymar
MF	5	Anabel Gambero
MF	10	Jorgelina Rimoldi
MF	7	Inés Arrondo
FW	9	Vanina Oneto	9'
FW	11	Karina Masotta (c)
Substitutions:
FW	2	Soledad García		(substituted on) 29'
FW	13	Laura Maiztegui		(substituted on) 28'
DF	14	Mercedes Margalot		(substituted on) 54'
FW	15	María Paz Hernández		(substituted on) 18'
Manager:
(Argentina) Sergio Vigil

== Final standings ==
As per statistical convention in field hockey, matches decided in extra time are counted as wins and losses, while matches decided by penalty shoot-outs are counted as draws.

Pos	Team	Pld	W	D	L	GF	GA	GD	Pts	Final result
1st place, gold medalist(s)	Australia	8	7	1	0	25	5	+20	22	Gold medal
2nd place, silver medalist(s)	Argentina	8	5	0	3	18	12	+6	15	Silver medal
3rd place, bronze medalist(s)	Netherlands	8	3	2	3	14	18	−4	11	Bronze medal
4	Spain	8	1	4	3	5	9	−4	7	Fourth place
5	China	7	2	1	4	6	12	−6	7	Eliminated in medal round
6	New Zealand	7	2	2	3	10	17	−7	8	Eliminated in medal round
7	Germany	6	3	2	1	11	8	+3	11	Eliminated in group stage
8	Great Britain	6	2	1	3	8	9	−1	7	Eliminated in group stage
9	South Korea	6	1	2	3	9	11	−2	5	Eliminated in group stage
10	South Africa	6	1	1	4	6	11	−5	4	Eliminated in group stage

Source: FIH

== Goalscorers ==
There were 112 goals scored in 35 matches, for an average of 3.2 goals per match.

6 goals

- (Australia) Nicole Hudson

5 goals

- (Argentina) Vanina Oneto

4 goals

- (Argentina) Soledad García
- (Australia) Alyson Annan
- (Australia) Jenn Morris
- (Australia) Katrina Powell
- (Germany) Britta Becker
- (Netherlands) Suzan van der Wielen
- (South Korea) Kim Eun-Jing

3 goals

- (Argentina) Luciana Aymar
- (Argentina) Karina Masotta
- (China) Yang Huiping
- (United Kingdom) Melanie Clewlow
- (Netherlands) Ageeth Boomgaardt
- (New Zealand) Amanda Smith

2 goals

- (Argentina) Cecilia Rognoni
- (Australia) Claire Mitchell-Taverner
- (Germany) Nadine Ernsting-Krienke
- (Germany) Fanny Rinne
- (Netherlands) Minke Smabers
- (Netherlands) Carole Thate
- (New Zealand) Tina Bell-Kake
- (New Zealand) Anna Lawrence
- (New Zealand) Katherine Trolove
- (South Africa) Pietie Coetzee
- (South Africa) Alison Dare
- (Spain) Sonia de Ignacio-Simo

1 goal

- (Argentina) Jorgelina Rimoldi
- (Australia) Juliet Haslam
- (Australia) Rechelle Hawkes
- (Australia) Alison Peek
- (Australia) Kate Starre
- (Australia) Julie Towers
- (China) Tang Chunling
- (China) Cheng Hui
- (China) Zhou Wanfeng
- (Germany) Natascha Keller
- (Germany) Heike Lätzsch
- (Germany) Inga Möller
- (United Kingdom) Christina Cullen
- (United Kingdom) Denise Marston-Smith
- (United Kingdom) Mandy Nicholson
- (United Kingdom) Rhona Simpson
- (United Kingdom) Jane Smith
- (Netherlands) Margje Teeuwen
- (Netherlands) Fleur van de Kieft
- (Netherlands) Macha van der Vaart
- (New Zealand) Moira Senior
- (South Africa) Marilyn Agliotti
- (South Africa) Jacqueline Geyser
- (South Korea) Cho Bo-Ra
- (South Korea) Lee Eun-Young
- (South Korea) Yoo Hee-Joo
- (South Korea) Shin Mi-Kyung
- (South Korea) Kim Seong-Eun
- (Spain) Sonia Barrio
- (Spain) Núria Camón
- (Spain) Erdoitza Goikoetxea

Source: FIH
