= Muhammad Shafqat Malik =

Pakistani field hockey player (born 1970)

Personal information
- Nationality: Pakistani
- Born: 7 September 1970 (age 55)

Sport
- Sport: Field hockey

Muhammad Shafqat Malik (born 7 September 1970) is a Pakistani field hockey player. He competed at the 1996 Summer Olympics and the 2000 Summer Olympics.
