= Sabu Varkey =

Indian field hockey player

Personal information
- Nationality: Indian
- Born: 21 January 1971 (age 55) Kerala, India

Sport
- Sport: Field hockey

Medal record

Representing India

Men's field hockey

Asian Games
Silver medal – second place	1994 Hiroshima	Team
Gold medal – first place	1998 Bangkok	Team

Sabu Varkey (born 21 January 1971) is an Indian field hockey player. He competed in the men's tournament at the 1996 Summer Olympics.
