= Irfan Mahmood =

Pakistani field hockey player

Personal information
- Nationality: Pakistani
- Born: 1 September 1972 (age 53)

Sport
- Sport: Field hockey

Irfan Mahmood (born 1 September 1972) is a Pakistani field hockey player. He competed in the men's tournament at the 1996 Summer Olympics.
