= Rahim Khan (field hockey) =

Pakistani field hockey player

Personal information
- Born: 20 April 1971 (age 55)

Sport
- Sport: Field hockey
Medal record
Men's field hockey
Representing Pakistan
World Cup
Gold medal – first place	1994 Sydney	Team
Asian Games
Bronze medal – third place	1994 Hiroshima	Team
Champions Trophy
Gold medal – first place	1994 Lahore	Team
Silver medal – second place	1996 Madras	Team

Rahim Khan (Urdu:رحيم خان, born 20 April 1971) is a former Olympian and inventor of 'reverse flick'. He is a hockey legend who was a member of Pakistan field hockey team who won the Men's World cup hockey tournament in 1994.

He played 126 international matches by scoring 25 international goals and most of them using the reverse flick he invented. He plays at right- in position.

== Early life and career ==
Rahim Khan was born on 20 April 1971 at Mingora city of Swat District. He first started playing hockey at high school level. Then he played for a local club Eleven Star, Saidu Sharif for many years. He was first selected at national level, by Pakistan WAPDA hockey team. Then he joined Pakistan International Airlines (P.I.A) hockey club. He was selected for Pakistani squad in 1991. Former Olympian, Rahim Khan played five Champions Trophies, two World Cup games at Atlanta Olympics. He won gold medal in 1994 Champions Trophy and World Cup, winning bronze medals in Asia Cup and Asian Games, silver medal in SAF Games and gold medal in World Cup Qualifying round in his hockey carrier from 1991 to 1998.

Rahim Khan is currently running a hockey coaching academy at Peshawar.

== Awards ==
- Pride of Performance award by the Government of Pakistan in 1994.

== See also ==
- List of Pakistani field hockey players
