= A. B. Subbaiah =

Indian field hockey player and coach

Personal information
- Full name: Anjaparavanda Bopaiah Subbaiah
- Born: 8 August 1970 (age 55) Madikeri, Kodagu district Karnataka, India

Sport
- Sport: Field hockey
Senior career
Years	Team	Caps	Goals
1987–2007	Air India	-	-
National team
Years	Team	Caps	Goals
1988–1998	India	100+	-
Medal record
Men's field hockey
Representing India
Asian Games
Silver medal – second place	1990 Beijing	Team
Silver medal – second place	1994 Hiroshima	Team
Gold medal – first place	1998 Bangkok	Team

Anjaparavanda Bopaiah Subbaiah (born 8 August 1970) is a former Indian field hockey goalkeeper and coach. He competed in the men's tournament at the 1996 Summer Olympics.

== Early life ==
He was born in Madikeri (Kodagu district, Karnataka) into the Kodava community. He played hockey for his school, St. Michael's Madikeri, as a fourteen year old. He was a product of Sports Authority of India (SAI) hostel, Bangalore.

== Career ==
Subbaiah has participated in the Commonwealth Games. He was part of the 1998 gold-winning Asian Games Indian team. He is a recipient of the Arjuna Award. Between 1988 and 1998, he took part in 285 international matches. He represented and captained the Indian hockey team between the years 1987 and 2007.

== Awards ==
Subbaiah was conferred with an honorary doctorate from the Mangalore University by Hans Raj Bhardwaj, Governor of Karnataka.

== Retirement ==
He is a commentator, coach, manager, administrator, umpire and selector as well. He was part of the Hockey India disciplinary panel as well. A B Subbaiah is also part of the 13-member Hockey India committee. He is the Hockey Karnataka secretary since 2018.
