= Pakistan national field hockey team results (1990–1999) =

These are all the international matches played by Pakistan national field hockey team from 1990 to 1999.

== Competitive record ==
- Win Draw Loss

Year	Competition	Location(s)	Venue(s)	GP	W	D	L	GF	GA	Result
1990	1990 FIH Hockey World Cup	(Pakistan)	Lahore	7	4	1	2	13	10	2nd
1990	BMW Trophy Amsterdam 1990	(Netherlands)	Amsterdam	6	4	1	1	18	13	2nd
1990	Tour of Europe	(West Germany) (Spain)	Mulheim, Munich, Barcelona	4	2	0	2	9	8	-
1990	1990 Asian Games	(China)	Beijing	6	6	0	0	42	5	1st
1990	1990 Hockey Champions Trophy	(Australia)	Melbourne	5	2	0	3	12	11	5th
1991	Six Nations Madrid	(Spain)	Madrid	3	1	1	1	3	5	5th
1991	Four Nations Mulheim	(West Germany)	Mulheim	3	1	0	2	7	5	3rd
1991	Four Nations Paris	(France)	Paris	3	2	0	1	16	7	2nd
1991	1991 Sultan Azlan Shah Cup	(Malaysia)	Ipoh	5	4	0	1	28	9	2nd
1991	Tour of Great Britain	(England) (Scotland) (Wales)	Merseyside, Glasgow, Cardiff	5	4	1	0	19	6	-
1991	Test series vs Ireland	(Republic of Ireland) (Northern Ireland)	Dublin, Lisburn	3	3	0	0	8	1	Winners
1991	1991 Hockey Champions Trophy	(Germany)	Berlin	5	3	1	1	14	8	2nd
1992	1992 Hockey Champions Trophy	(Pakistan)	Karachi	6	4	0	2	14	6	3rd
1992	BMW Trophy Amsterdam 1992	(Netherlands)	Amsterdam	4	3	1	0	10	7	1st
1992	1992 Summer Olympics	(Spain)	Barcelona	7	6	0	1	25	11	3rd
1993	Test series vs Netherlands	(Pakistan)	Lahore, Rawalpindi	3	2	1	0	11	8	Winners
1993	Test series vs France	(Pakistan)	Lahore, Peshawar, Karachi	4	4	0	0	26	3	Winners
1993	Tour of Europe	(Netherlands) (France)	Amstelveen, Paris	4	4	0	0	17	4	-
1993	1993 Hockey Champions Trophy	(Malaysia)	Kuala Lumpur	6	2	1	3	12	14	4th
1993	Buenos Aires Four Nations	(Argentina)	Buenos Aires	5	0	1	4	5	12	4th
1993	Test series vs Germany	(Germany)	Leipzig, Kothen, Berlin	3	0	1	2	5	9	Lost
1993	Hamburg Masters Cup	(Germany)	Hamburg	3	2	0	1	5	4	2nd
1993	1993 Hockey Asia Cup	(Japan)	Hiroshima	5	4	0	1	38	8	3rd
1994	1994 Hockey Champions Trophy	(Pakistan)	Lahore	6	5	1	0	14	6	1st
1994	Test series vs Germany	(Germany)	Frankfurt, Leipzig, Hamburg, Celle, Neuss	5	1	2	2	9	15	Lost
1994	NCM Seven Nations Amstelveen	(Netherlands)	Amstelveen	6	5	0	1	23	13	3rd
1994	1994 Sultan Azlan Shah Cup	(Malaysia)	Kuala Lumpur	5	3	0	2	14	10	2nd
1994	1994 Asian Games	(Japan)	Hiroshima	6	5	0	1	27	3	3rd
1994	Test series vs New Zealand	(New Zealand)	Christchurch, Wellington, Auckland	3	2	1	0	7	3	Winners
1994	1994 FIH Hockey World Cup	(Australia)	Sydney	7	6	0	1	12	6	1st
1995	Test match vs Germany	(Pakistan)	Lahore	1	0	1	0	1	1	-
1995	1995 Hockey Champions Trophy	(Germany)	Berlin	6	3	1	2	8	8	3rd
1995	Triangular Test series	(Pakistan)	Karachi, Rawalpindi, Lahore	6	0	4	2	8	11	3rd
1995	Fred Pringiers Memorial Cup	(Belgium)	Brussels	3	3	0	0	8	3	1st
1995	1995 South Asian Games	(India)	Madras	4	3	0	1	39	7	2nd
1996	Atlanta Pre-Olympics Six Nations	(United States)	Atlanta	5	4	1	0	13	5	1st
1996	Four Nations Milton Keynes	(England)	Buckinghamshire	3	1	0	2	6	11	3rd
1996	NCM Four Nations Amstelveen	(Netherlands)	Amstelveen	4	1	0	3	7	11	3rd
1996	Test series vs Canada	(Canada)	Vancouver	3	2	0	1	8	7	Winners
1996	1996 Summer Olympics	(United States)	Atlanta	7	3	1	3	14	12	6th
1996	1996 Hockey Champions Trophy	(India)	Madras	6	3	1	2	15	13	2nd
1997	Pakistan Golden Jubilee Cup	(Pakistan)	Karachi	5	1	4	0	17	14	3rd
1997	Test series vs Australia	(Australia)	Perth, Adelaide, Sydney, Canberra, Melbourne	6	3	0	3	14	13	Winners
1997	Four Nations Breda	(Netherlands)	Breda	3	1	0	2	8	10	3rd
1997	Test match vs Germany	(Germany)	Mulheim	1	0	0	1	0	3	-
1997	1997 Hockey Champions Trophy	(Australia)	Adelaide	6	1	1	4	14	20	5th
1998	Test series vs India	(Pakistan) (India)	Peshawar, Rawalpindi, Lahore, Karachi New Delhi, Jalandhar, Hyderabad, Chennai	8	4	1	3	17	13	Winners
1998	Test series vs Kenya	(Kenya)	Nairobi	2	1	0	1	6	5	Drawn
1998	Test series vs Belgium	(Belgium)	Brussels, Antwerp	2	1	1	0	8	5	Winners
1998	1998 FIH Hockey World Cup	(Netherlands)	Utrecht	7	5	0	2	26	16	5th
1998	1998 Commonwealth Games	(Malaysia)	Kuala Lumpur	4	1	2	1	11	11	10th
1998	1998 Hockey Champions Trophy	(Pakistan)	Lahore	6	2	2	2	18	17	2nd
1998	1998 Asian Games	(Thailand)	Bangkok	6	4	1	1	21	4	3rd
1999	Test series vs India	(India) (Pakistan)	New Delhi, Bhopal, Hyderabad, Chennai Lahore, Karachi, Peshawar, Rawalpindi	9	6	0	3	27	21	Winners
1999	1999 Sultan Azlan Shah Cup	(Malaysia)	Kuala Lumpur	6	6	0	0	29	11	1st
1999	1999 Hockey Champions Trophy	(Australia)	Brisbane	6	1	3	2	10	12	6th
1999	Four Nations Amstelveen	(Netherlands)	Amstelveen	4	1	1	2	15	18	2nd
1999	Test series vs Switzerland	(Switzerland)	Lugano, Lausanne	2	1	1	0	10	7	Winners
1999	Four Nations Wettingen	(Switzerland)	Wettingen	3	2	0	1	17	8	2nd
1999	1999 Hockey Asia Cup	(Malaysia)	Kuala Lumpur	6	5	0	1	39	8	2nd

== Results ==
=== 1990 ===
12 February 1990

Pakistan	6 - 3	Spain
Ibrahim 8'; Shahbaz Sr. 14', 22', 34'; Bashir 39'; Zaman 64'	Report	Casas 24'; Escudé 48', 50'

Lahore, Pakistan

Event: 1990 FIH Hockey World Cup
Pool match

13 February 1990

Pakistan	2 - 1	Ireland
Bashir 14'; Zaman 33'	Report	Kirkwood 21'

Lahore, Pakistan

Event: 1990 FIH Hockey World Cup
Pool match

16 February 1990

Pakistan	1 - 0	Canada
Zaman 24'	Report

Lahore, Pakistan

Event: 1990 FIH Hockey World Cup
Pool match

17 February 1990

Pakistan	1 - 1	England
Bashir 50'	Report	Mayer 23'

Lahore, Pakistan

Event: 1990 FIH Hockey World Cup
Pool match

19 February 1990

Pakistan	0 - 1	West Germany
	Report	Hilgers 54'

Lahore, Pakistan

Event: 1990 FIH Hockey World Cup
Pool match

21 February 1990

Australia	1 - 2	Pakistan
Corbitt 10'	Report	Saeed 3'; Bashir 44'

Lahore, Pakistan

Event: 1990 FIH Hockey World Cup
Semifinal

23 February 1990

Netherlands	3 - 1	Pakistan
Bovelander 12', 14'; Weterings 37'	Report	Shahbaz Sr. 5'

Lahore, Pakistan

Event: 1990 FIH Hockey World Cup
Final

17 June 1990

Pakistan	4 - 1	Spain
Feroz 22'; Qamar 48'; Mohib 51'; Zaman 55'	Report	Escudé 13'

Amsterdam, Netherlands

Event: BMW Trophy Amsterdam 1990
Round-robin first match

18 June 1990

West Germany	0 - 1	Pakistan
	Report	Bashir 49'

Amsterdam, Netherlands

Event: BMW Trophy Amsterdam 1990
Round-robin second match

19 June 1990

India	4 - 2	Pakistan
Pillay 15', 45'; Prakash 20'; Pargat 56'	Report	Bashir 60'; Qamar 66'

Amsterdam, Netherlands

Event: BMW Trophy Amsterdam 1990
Round-robin third test match

21 June 1990

Pakistan	4 - 4	Australia
Musaddiq 31'; Qamar 47'; Zaman 65'; Mohib 69'	Report	Stacy 1'; Corbitt 16'; Birmingham 22'; Reid 27'

Amsterdam, Netherlands

Event: BMW Trophy Amsterdam 1990
Round-robin fourth match

22 June 1990

Netherlands	1 - 2	Pakistan
Weterings 46'	Report	Zaman 30', 60'

Amsterdam, Netherlands

Event: BMW Trophy Amsterdam 1990
Round-robin fifth match

24 June 1990

Pakistan	5 - 2	Great Britain
Zaman 2'; Sharif 19'; Musaddiq 28', 50'; Qamar 56'	Report	Hill 43'; Potter 59'

Amsterdam, Netherlands

Event: BMW Trophy Amsterdam 1990
Round-robin sixth match

26 June 1990

West Germany	4 - 3	Pakistan
Schmidt-Opper 8'; Hilgers 9', 45'; Becker 62'	Report	Saeed 30'; Mujahid 52'; Zaman 66'

Mülheim, West Germany

Event: Test series
First test match

28 June 1990

West Germany	2 - 1	Pakistan
	Report

Munich, West Germany

Event: Test series
Second test match

1 July 1990

Spain	1 - 3	Pakistan
Casas 47'	Report	Musaddiq 10', 48'; Feroz 32'

Barcelona, Spain

Event: Test series
First test match

2 July 1990

Spain	1 - 2	Pakistan
Usoz 66'	Report	Bashir 35'; Sharif 65'

Barcelona, Spain

Event: Test series
Second test match

23 September 1990

Pakistan	11 - 1	Japan
Irfan 6', 11', 62'; Bashir 17'; Feroz 21', 30'; Qamar 26'; Musaddiq 49'; Shahbaz Sr. 52', 59', 66'	Report

Beijing, China

Event: 1990 Asian Games
Round-robin first match

25 September 1990

Pakistan	4 - 2	Malaysia
	Report

Beijing, China

Event: 1990 Asian Games
Round-robin second match

27 September 1990

South Korea	0 - 5	Pakistan
	Report	Irfan 4', 27', 65'; Feroz 20'; Shahbaz Sr. 54'

Beijing, China

Event: 1990 Asian Games
Round-robin third match

29 September 1990

China	0 - 5	Pakistan
	Report	Shahbaz Sr. 11'; Saeed 23'; Zaman 32'; Irfan 47', 63'

Beijing, China

Event: 1990 Asian Games
Round-robin fourth match

3 October 1990

Pakistan	14 - 0	Hong Kong
	Report

Beijing, China

Event: 1990 Asian Games
Round-robin fifth match

5 October 1990

Pakistan	3 - 2	India
	Report

Beijing, China

Event: 1990 Asian Games
Round-robin sixth match

17 November 1990

Pakistan	6 - 3	Germany
Musaddiq 22', 24', 60'; Zaman 29', 31'; Qamar 64'	Report	Reck 34'; Meinhardt 59'; Ness 65'

Melbourne, Australia

Event: 1990 Hockey Champions Trophy
Round-robin first match

19 November 1990

Australia	3 - 0	Pakistan
Stacy 18'; Hager 48'; Deane 67'	Report

Melbourne, Australia

Event: 1990 Hockey Champions Trophy
Round-robin second match

22 November 1990

Pakistan	4 - 1	Soviet Union
Zaman 22', 40', 52'; Mujahid 46'	Report	Hayrapetyan 67'

Melbourne, Australia

Event: 1990 Hockey Champions Trophy
Round-robin third match

24 November 1990

Great Britain	2 - 1	Pakistan
Clift 16'; Thompson 30'	Report	Zaman 64'

Melbourne, Australia

Event: 1990 Hockey Champions Trophy
Round-robin fourth match

25 November 1990

Netherlands	2 - 1	Pakistan
Weterings 22', 69'	Report	Shahbaz Sr. 40'

Melbourne, Australia

Event: 1990 Hockey Champions Trophy
Round-robin fifth match

=== 1991 ===
25 April 1991

England	1 - 0	Pakistan
	Report

Madrid, Spain

Event: Six Nations Madrid 1991
Pool match

26 April 1991

Pakistan	1 - 2	Germany
Shahbaz Sr. 65'	Report	Becker 34', 60'

Madrid, Spain

Event: Six Nations Madrid 1991
Pool match

28 April 1991

Argentina	2 - 2 (a.e.t.)	Pakistan
	Report
Penalties
	0 - 3

Madrid, Spain

Event: Six Nations Madrid 1991
Fifth and sixth place

3 May 1991

Germany	2 - 1	Pakistan
	Report

Mülheim, Germany

Event: Four Nations Mülheim 1991
Round-robin first match

4 May 1991

Pakistan	2 - 3	Australia
	Report

Mülheim, Germany

Event: Four Nations Mülheim 1991
Round-robin second match

5 May 1991

Pakistan	4 - 0	Spain
	Report

Mülheim, Germany

Event: Four Nations Mülheim 1991
Round-robin third match

8 May 1991

Australia	6 - 2	Pakistan
Birmingham 13', 38'; Hager 19', 30'; Stacy 34'; Davies 45'	Report	Zaman 10', 55'

Elbeuf, France

Event: Four Nations Paris 1991
Round-robin first match

9 May 1991

Pakistan	5 - 1	Wales
Zaman 10'; Qamar 38'; Bashir 39', 43'; Shahbaz Sr. 64'	Report	Hacker 58'

Elbeuf, France

Event: Four Nations Paris 1991
Round-robin second match

11 May 1991

Pakistan	9 - 0	France
	Report

Elbeuf, France

Event: Four Nations Paris 1991
Round-robin third match

28 July 1991

New Zealand	1 - 7	Pakistan
Daji 15'	Report	Shahbaz Sr. 5'; Bashir 25'; Irfan 42'; Zaman 55', 62', 66'; Feroz 60'

Ipoh, Malaysia

Event: 1991 Sultan Azlan Shah Cup
Round-robin first match

29 July 1991

Soviet Union	4 - 5	Pakistan
Seksenbayev 21', 47', 51'; Atanov 56'	Report	Feroz 3'; Bashir 28', 60', 66'; Zaman 31'

Ipoh, Malaysia

Event: 1991 Sultan Azlan Shah Cup
Round-robin second match

1 August 1991

India	1 - 0	Pakistan
Kumar 5'	Report

Ipoh, Malaysia

Event: 1991 Sultan Azlan Shah Cup
Round-robin third match

2 August 1991

Pakistan	8 - 0	South Korea
Bashir 2'; Ejaz 5'; Zaman 9', 17', 37', 67'; Shahbaz Sr. 10'; Feroz 64'	Report

Ipoh, Malaysia

Event: 1991 Sultan Azlan Shah Cup
Round-robin fourth match

3 August 1991

Pakistan	8 - 3	Malaysia
Ejaz 12'; Shahbaz Jr. 14'; Feroz 37', 50'; Zaman 40'; Bashir 48', 63'; Shahbaz Sr. 65'	Report	Embaraj 30'; Hadi 58'; Fidelis 68'

Ipoh, Malaysia

Event: 1991 Sultan Azlan Shah Cup
Round-robin fifth match

17 August 1991

Great Britain	1 - 2	Pakistan
	Report

Merseyside, England

Event: Test match

20 August 1991

Great Britain	0 - 3	Pakistan
	Report

Glasgow, Scotland

Event: Test match

24 August 1991

Scotland	1 - 5	Pakistan
	Report

Glasgow, Scotland

Event: Test match

31 August 1991

Wales	0 - 5	Pakistan
	Report

Cardiff, Wales

Event: Test match

1 September 1991

Great Britain	4 - 4	Pakistan
	Report

Cardiff, Wales

Event: Test match

5 September 1991

Ireland	0 - 1	Pakistan
	Report	Feroze 60'

Dublin, Republic of Ireland

Event: Test series
First test match

6 September 1991

Ireland	1 - 5	Pakistan
	Report

Dublin, Republic of Ireland

Event: Test series
Second test match

8 September 1991

Ireland	0 - 2	Pakistan
	Report

Lisburn, Northern Ireland

Event: Test series
Third test match

13 September 1991

Germany	4 - 3	Pakistan
Meinhardt 8', 38'; Becker 24'; Blunck 52'	Report	Ibrahim 12'; Shahbaz Sr. 15'; Bashir 48'

Berlin, Germany

Event: 1991 Hockey Champions Trophy
Round-robin first match

14 September 1991

Pakistan	2 - 1	Australia
Bashir 23', 66'	Report	Stacy 8'

Berlin, Germany

Event: 1991 Hockey Champions Trophy
Round-robin second match

18 September 1991

Netherlands	1 - 1	Pakistan
Van den Honert 46'	Report	Bashir 69'

Berlin, Germany

Event: 1991 Hockey Champions Trophy
Round-robin third match

19 September 1991

Pakistan	7 - 2	Soviet Union
Musaddiq 5', 25', 27'; Bashir 28', 64'; Qamar 43', 60'	Report	Ioultchiev 45'; Seksenbayev 47'

Berlin, Germany

Event: 1991 Hockey Champions Trophy
Round-robin fourth match

21 September 1991

Great Britain	0 - 1	Pakistan
	Report	Bashir 5'

Berlin, Germany

Event: 1991 Hockey Champions Trophy
Round-robin fifth match

=== 1992 ===
20 February 1992

Pakistan	1 - 0	Great Britain
Shahbaz Sr. 68'	Report

Karachi, Pakistan

Event: 1992 Hockey Champions Trophy
Pool match

21 February 1992

France	0 - 6	Pakistan
	Report	Feroz 17', 27'; Bashir 21'; Musaddiq 56'; Zaman 60'; Qamar 70'

Karachi, Pakistan

Event: 1992 Hockey Champions Trophy
Pool match

23 February 1992

Netherlands	1 - 0	Pakistan
Van den Honert 70'	Report

Karachi, Pakistan

Event: 1992 Hockey Champions Trophy
Pool match

24 February 1992

Pakistan	2 - 0	Australia
Shahbaz Jr. 24'; Qamar 50'	Report

Karachi, Pakistan

Event: 1992 Hockey Champions Trophy
Pool match

26 February 1992

Germany	4 - 3	Pakistan
Michler 12'; Blunck 25', 56'; Fischer 51'	Report	Zaman 8'; Bashir 39', 63'

Karachi, Pakistan

Event: 1992 Hockey Champions Trophy
Pool match

28 February 1992

Pakistan	2 - 1	Netherlands
Bashir 11'; Shahbaz Jr. 60'	Report	Weterings 19'

Karachi, Pakistan

Event: 1992 Hockey Champions Trophy
Third and fourth place

3 June 1992

Germany	2 - 3	Pakistan
Keller 8'; Fischer 65'	Report	Feroz 36', 61'; Zaman 59'

Amsterdam, Netherlands

Event: BMW Trophy Amsterdam 1992
Round-robin first match

5 June 1992

Pakistan	3 - 3	Great Britain
Bashir 41'; Shahbaz Sr. 49'; Feroz 61'	Report	Williams 6'; Thompson 20'; Potter 24'

Amsterdam, Netherlands

Event: BMW Trophy Amsterdam 1992
Round-robin second match

6 June 1992

Netherlands	1 - 2	Pakistan
Bovelander 24'	Report	Zaman 31', 47'

Amsterdam, Netherlands

Event: BMW Trophy Amsterdam 1992
Round-robin third match

7 June 1992

Pakistan	2 - 1	Spain
Bajwa 6'; Feroz 12'	Report	Iglesias 27'

Amsterdam, Netherlands

Event: BMW Trophy Amsterdam 1992
Round-robin fourth match

26 July 1992

Pakistan	4 - 1	Malaysia
Bajwa 8', 24'; Bashir 29'; Zaman 41'	Report	Nor 17'

Barcelona, Spain

Event: 1992 Summer Olympics
Pool match

28 July 1992

Pakistan	1 - 0	New Zealand
Bajwa 39'	Report

Barcelona, Spain

Event: 1992 Summer Olympics
Pool match

30 July 1992

Pakistan	6 - 2	CIS
Bashir 14', 53'; Musaddiq 32'; Zaman 48', 59'; Shahbaz Sr. 54'	Report	Ioultchiev 2', 53'

Barcelona, Spain

Event: 1992 Summer Olympics
Pool match

1 August 1992

Netherlands	2 - 3	Pakistan
Bovelander 15'; Veen 70+'	Report	Bashir 30', 46'; Zaman 43'

Barcelona, Spain

Event: 1992 Summer Olympics
Pool match

3 August 1992

Spain	1 - 6	Pakistan
Iglesias 38'	Report	Zaman 22', 50', 70+'; Shahbaz Jr. 45'; Feroz 49', 56'

Barcelona, Spain

Event: 1992 Summer Olympics
Pool match

5 August 1992

Pakistan	1 - 2 (a.e.t.)	Germany
Bashir 28'	Report	Fisher 46', 89'

Barcelona, Spain

Event: 1992 Summer Olympics
Semifinal

8 August 1992

Netherlands	3 - 4	Pakistan
Delissen 20'; Veen 22'; Weterings 69'	Report	Shahbaz Jr. 55'; Bashir 63', 68'; Qamar 67'

Barcelona, Spain

Event: 1992 Summer Olympics
Third and fourth place

=== 1993 ===
8 February 1993

Pakistan	1 - 1	Netherlands
Bashir 47'	Report	Westbroek 44'

Lahore, Pakistan

Event: Test series
First test match

9 February 1993

Pakistan	6 - 4	Netherlands
Zaman 15'; Bashir 22'; Shahbaz Jr. 23', 36'; Farhat 52'; Musaddiq 55'	Report	Delissen 28', 70'; Drenth 41'; Brinkman 50'

Lahore, Pakistan

Event: Test series
Second test match

13 February 1993

Pakistan	4 - 3	Netherlands
Bashir 29'; Shahbaz Jr. 41', 57'; Junaid 46'	Report	Drenth 11' van Pelt 19'; Veen 26'

Rawalpindi, Pakistan

Event: Test series
Third test match

16 February 1993

Pakistan	7 - 1	France
	Report

Lahore, Pakistan

Event: Test series
First test match

18 February 1993

Pakistan	7 - 1	France
	Report

Peshawar, Pakistan

Event: Test series
Second test match

20 February 1993

Pakistan	4 - 0	France
	Report

Peshawar, Pakistan

Event: Test series
Third test match

22 February 1993

Pakistan	8 - 1	France
	Report

Karachi, Pakistan

Event: Test series
Fourth test match

8 May 1993

Ireland	1 - 5	Pakistan
	Report

Amstelveen, Netherlands

Event: Test match

9 May 1993

Ireland	Match abandoned	Pakistan
	Report

Amstelveen, Netherlands

Event: Test match

Note Match was abandoned due to thunderstorm Pakistan was leading 5-0

12 May 1993

Netherlands	1 - 4	Pakistan
Veen 17'	Report	Bashir 8'; Shahbaz Jr. 19'; Shahbaz Sr. 48'; Ashraf 66'

Amstelveen, Netherlands

Event: Test match

23 May 1993

France	2 - 8	Pakistan
	Report

Paris, France

Event: Test match

3 July 1993

Australia	2 - 1	Pakistan
Hager 4'; Wansbrough 60'	Report	Zaman 55'

Kuala Lumpur, Malaysia

Event: 1993 Hockey Champions Trophy
Pool match

4 July 1993

Germany	3 - 2	Pakistan
Moissl 7'; Mayerhöfer 15'; Blunck 29'	Report	Musaddiq 6'; Bashir 57'

Kuala Lumpur, Malaysia

Event: 1993 Hockey Champions Trophy
Pool stage

6 July 1993

Netherlands	1 - 3	Pakistan
Brinkman 57'	Report	Bashir 33'; Ashraf 35', 50'

Kuala Lumpur, Malaysia

Event: 1993 Hockey Champions Trophy
Pool stage

7 July 1993

Malaysia	2 - 2	Pakistan
Nawawi 41', 53'	Report	Bashir 25', 48'

Kuala Lumpur, Malaysia

Event: 1993 Hockey Champions Trophy
Pool stage

9 July 1993

Pakistan	2 - 0	Spain
Ashraf 26'; Bashir 48'	Report

Kuala Lumpur, Malaysia

Event: 1993 Hockey Champions Trophy
Pool stage

11 July 1993

Netherlands	6 - 2	Pakistan
Van den Honert 11', 46', 59', 64', 68'; Brinkman 15'	Report	Bashir 14'; Ashraf 19'

Kuala Lumpur, Malaysia

Event: 1993 Hockey Champions Trophy
Third and fourth place

31 July 1993

Germany	4 - 2	Pakistan
	Report

Buenos Aires, Argentina

Event: Four Nations Buenos Aires 1993

3 August 1993

Cuba	1 - 1	Pakistan
	Report

Buenos Aires, Argentina

Event: Four Nations Buenos Aires 1993
Round-robin second match

6 August 1993

Pakistan	0 - 1	Argentina
	Report

Buenos Aires, Argentina

Event: Four Nations Buenos Aires 1993
Round-robin fourth match

7 August 1993

Pakistan	1 - 2	Cuba
	Report

Buenos Aires, Argentina

Event: Four Nations Buenos Aires 1993
Round-robin fifth match

8 August 1993

Pakistan	1 - 4	Germany
	Report

Buenos Aires, Argentina

Event: Four Nations Buenos Aires 1993
Round-robin sixth match

27 August 1993

Germany	4 - 1	Pakistan
Ness 24', 28'; Tewes 31'; Blunck 48'	Report	Mujahid 14'

Leipzig, Germany

Event: Test series
First test match

28 August 1993

Germany	3 - 3	Pakistan
	Report

Köthen, Germany

Event: Test series
Second test match

29 August 1993

Germany	2 - 1	Pakistan
	Report

Berlin, Germany

Event: Test series
Third test match

3 September 1993

Australia	3 - 1	Pakistan
Wansbrough 12', 53'; Lewis 55'	Report	Bajwa 63'

Hamburg, Germany

Event: Panasonic Hamburg Masters Cup
Round-robin first match

4 September 1993

Pakistan	2 - 1	Germany
Shahbaz Sr. 45', 64'	Report	Ness 55'

Hamburg, Germany

Event: Panasonic Hamburg Masters Cup 1993
Round-robin second match

5 September 1993

Netherlands	0 - 2	Pakistan
	Report	Bajwa 16'; Zaman 40'

Hamburg, Germany

Event: Panasonic Hamburg Masters Cup 1993
Round-robin third match

5 November 1993

Pakistan	5 - 0	China
	Report

Hiroshima, Japan

Event: 1993 Hockey Asia Cup
Pool stage

9 November 1993

Pakistan	20 - 0	Thailand
	Report

Hiroshima, Japan

Event: 1993 Hockey Asia Cup
Pool stage

11 November 1993

Malaysia	2 - 8	Pakistan
	Report

Hiroshima, Japan

Event: 1993 Hockey Asia Cup
Pool stage

13 November 1993

South Korea	4 - 0	Pakistan
	Report

Hiroshima, Japan

Event: 1993 Hockey Asia Cup
Semifinal

14 November 1993

Pakistan	5 - 2	Malaysia
	Report

Hiroshima, Japan

Event: 1993 Hockey Asia Cup
Third and fourth place

=== 1994 ===
17 March 1994

Great Britain	1 - 4	Pakistan
Garcia 25'	Report	Ashraf 2', 67'; Shahbaz Jr. 21', 58'

Lahore, Pakistan

Event: 1994 Hockey Champions Trophy
Pool stage

18 March 1994

Spain	1 - 3	Pakistan
Garcia 40'	Report	Ashraf 12'; Zaman 55'; Shahbaz Jr. 67'

Lahore, Pakistan

Event: 1994 Hockey Champions Trophy
Pool stage

20 March 1994

Pakistan	2 - 1	Netherlands
Ashraf 17'; Mujahid 60'	Report	Bovelander 66'

Lahore, Pakistan

Event: 1994 Hockey Champions Trophy
Pool stage

21 March 1994

Pakistan	2 - 0	Australia
Shahbaz Sr. 31'; Zaman 49'	Report

Lahore, Pakistan

Event: 1994 Hockey Champions Trophy
Pool stage

23 March 1994

Pakistan	1 - 1	Germany
Zaman 45'	Report	Kunz 20'

Lahore, Pakistan

Event: 1994 Hockey Champions Trophy
Pool stage

25 March 1994

Pakistan	2 - 2	Germany
Shafqat 33'; Shahbaz Sr. 39'	Report	Tewes 15'; Kunz 60'
Penalties
	5–4

Lahore, Pakistan

Event: 1994 Hockey Champions Trophy
Final

15 June 1994

Germany	2 - 1	Pakistan
Meinhardt 27', 47'	Report	Bajwa 6'

Frankfurt, Germany

Event: Test series
First test match

16 June 1994

Germany	1 - 1	Pakistan
Meinhardt 3'	Report	Mujahid 55'

Leipzig, Germany

Event: Test series
Second test match

18 June 1994

Germany	7 - 0	Pakistan
	Report

Hamburg, Germany

Event: Test series
Third test match

19 June 1994

Germany	1 - 3	Pakistan
	Report

Celle, Germany

Event: Test series
Fourth test match

21 June 1994

Germany	4 - 4	Pakistan
	Report

Neuss, Germany

Event: Test series
Fifth test match

26 June 1994

Pakistan	6 - 2	Malaysia
Ashraf 2', 47', 53'; Zaman 12', 60'; Bajwa 23'	Report	Chiow 45', 65'

Amsterdam, Netherlands

Event: NCM Seven Nations Amsterdam 1994
Round-robin first match

27 June 1994

Argentina	0 - 1	Pakistan
	Report	Shahbaz Sr. 29'

Amsterdam, Netherlands

Event: NCM Seven Nations Amsterdam 1994
Round-robin second match

29 June 1994

Pakistan	6 - 1	South Africa
Ashraf 28', 29', 56', 66'; Zaman 31'; Shahbaz Jr. 40'	Report	Cullen 38'

Amsterdam, Netherlands

Event: NCM Seven Nations Amsterdam 1994
Round-robin third match

30 June 1994

Netherlands	6 - 2	Pakistan
Bovelander 3', 6', 9', 19'; Veen 28'; Wijk 70'	Report	Danish 56'; Ashraf 61'

Amsterdam, Netherlands

Event: NCM Seven Nations Amsterdam 1994
Round-robin fourth match

2 July 1994

Pakistan	7 - 2	Australia
Bajwa 7', 57'; Ashraf 9', 52'; Shahbaz Sr. 16'; Rahim 20'; Danish 59'	Report	Davies 29'; Stacy 44'

Amsterdam, Netherlands

Event: NCM Seven Nations Amsterdam 1994
Round-robin fifth match

3 July 1994

Germany	2 - 1	Pakistan
Bechmann 33'; Tewes 57'	Report	Shahbaz Sr. 58'

Amstelveen, Netherlands

Event: NCM Trophy Amstelveen 1994
Round-robin sixth match

20 August 1994

Malaysia	1 - 5	Pakistan
	Report

Penang, Malaysia

Event: 1994 Sultan Azlan Shah Cup
Pool match

21 August 1994

Pakistan	1 - 0	South Africa
Ashraf 54'	Report

Penang, Malaysia

Event: 1994 Sultan Azlan Shah Cup
Pool match

23 August 1994

Pakistan	3 - 5	England
Shahbaz Jr. 20', 34'; Shafqat 40'	Report	Crutchley 2', 31', 64'; Shaw 28'; Garcia 68'

Penang, Malaysia

Event: 1994 Sultan Azlan Shah Cup
Pool match

25 August 1994

Australia	2 - 3	Pakistan
Hager 1'; Corbitt 49'	Report	Ashraf 3'; Danish 10'; Bajwa 61'

Penang, Malaysia

Event: 1994 Sultan Azlan Shah Cup
Pool match

28 August 1994

England	2 - 2 (a.e.t.)	Pakistan
Crutchley 3'; Thompson 32'	Report	Ashraf 19', 59'
Penalties
	5 - 3

Penang, Malaysia

Event: 1994 Sultan Azlan Shah Cup
Final

4 October 1994

Pakistan	3 - 1	Kazakhstan
	Report

Hiroshima, Japan

Event: 1994 Asian Games
Pool stage

5 October 1994

Japan	0 - 4	Pakistan
	Report	Ashraf 2'; Zaman 41'; Asif 46'; Junaid 49'

Hiroshima, Japan

Event: 1994 Asian Games
Pool stage

7 October 1994

Pakistan	8 - 0	Oman
Ashraf 6'; Zaman 13', 28', 50'; Shahbaz Jr. 23'; Rahim 38', 52'; Bajwa 58'	Report

Hiroshima, Japan

Event: 1994 Asian Games
Pool stage

8 October 1994

Pakistan	4 - 1	Malaysia
Ashraf 5', 26', 69'; Zaman 70'	Report	Zaini 67'

Hiroshima, Japan

Event: 1994 Asian Games
Pool stage

12 October 1994

Pakistan	2 - 2 (a.e.t.)	South Korea
Bajwa 27'; Shahbaz Sr. 47'	Report	Shin-heum 8'; Young-kyu 62'
Penalties
	1 - 4

Hiroshima, Japan

Event: 1994 Asian Games
Semifinal

15 October 1994

Pakistan	6 - 0	Japan
Shahbaz Jr. 22'; Junaid 34'; Rahim 42'; Kaleem 50'; Ashraf 56', 63'	Report

Hiroshima, Japan

Event: 1994 Asian Games
Third and fourth place

12 November 1994

New Zealand	0 - 1	Pakistan
	Report

Wellington, New Zealand

Event: Test series
First test match

13 November 1994

New Zealand	1 - 4	Pakistan
	Report

Christchurch, New Zealand

Event: Test series
Second test match

15 November 1994

New Zealand	2 - 2	Pakistan
	Report

Auckland, New Zealand

Event: Test series
Third test match

23 November 1994

Pakistan	3 - 0	Argentina
Ashraf 30'; Zaman 60'; Feroz 64'	Report

Sydney, Australia

Event: 1994 FIH Hockey World Cup
Pool stage

25 November 1994

Pakistan	3 - 1	Spain
Ashraf 26', 51'; Feroz 62'	Report	García-Mauriño 41'

Sydney, Australia

Event: 1994 FIH Hockey World Cup
Pool stage

26 November 1994

Australia	1 - 2	Pakistan
Birmingham 49'	Report	Zaman 23'; Ashraf 40'

Sydney, Australia

Event: 1994 FIH Hockey World Cup
Pool stage

28 November 1994

Pakistan	0 - 2	England
	Report	Thompson 28', 49'

Sydney, Australia

Event: 1994 FIH Hockey World Cup
Pool stage

30 November 1994

Pakistan	2 - 0	Belarus
Ashraf 16', 64'	Report

Sydney, Australia

Event: 1994 FIH Hockey World Cup
Pool stage

2 December 1994

Pakistan	1 - 1	Germany
Ashraf 18'	Report	Meinhardt 22'
Penalties
	5–3

Sydney, Australia

Event: 1994 FIH Hockey World Cup
Semifinal

4 December 1994

Netherlands	1 - 1	Pakistan
Bovelander 17'	Report	Ashraf 21'
Penalties
	3-4

Sydney, Australia

Event: 1994 FIH Hockey World Cup
Final

=== 1995 ===
7 April 1995

Pakistan	1 - 1	Germany
Zaman 7'	Report	Michler 22'

Lahore, Pakistan

Event: Test match

23 September 1995

Australia	3 - 3	Pakistan
Stacy 39', 64'; Davies 61'	Report	Shahbaz Jr. 29'; Shahbaz Sr. 31'; Naveed 67'

Berlin, Germany

Event: 1995 Hockey Champions Trophy
Pool stage

24 September 1995

England	0 - 1	Pakistan
	Report	Naveed 44'

Berlin, Germany

Event: 1995 Hockey Champions Trophy
Pool stage

27 September 1995

Netherlands	2 - 0	Pakistan
Brinkman 51'; Van den Honert 56'	Report

Berlin, Germany

Event: 1995 Hockey Champions Trophy
Pool stage

28 September 1995

India	1 - 2	Pakistan
Ferreira 36'	Report	Shahbaz Sr. 12', 23'

Berlin, Germany

Event: 1995 Hockey Champions Trophy
Pool stage

30 September 1995

Germany	1 - 0	Pakistan
Meinhardt 64'	Report

Berlin, Germany

Event: 1995 Hockey Champions Trophy
Pool stage

1 October 1995

Netherlands	1 - 2	Pakistan
Van Wijk 2'	Report	Naveed 32'; Nadeem 50'

Berlin, Germany

Event: 1995 Hockey Champions Trophy
Third and fourth place

14 October 1995

Pakistan	2 - 3	South Korea
	Report

Karachi, Pakistan

Event: Triangular Test series
First test match

15 October 1995

Pakistan	0 - 2	Germany
	Report	Domke 7'; Bechmann 55'

Karachi, Pakistan

Event: Triangular Test series
Second test match

17 October 1995

South Korea	2 - 2	Pakistan
	Report

Rawalpindi, Pakistan

Event: Triangular Test series
Third test match

19 October 1995

Germany	1 - 1	Pakistan
Moissel 61'	Report	Ejaz 62'

Rawalpindi, Pakistan

Event: Triangular Test series
Fourth test match

21 October 1995

Pakistan	1 - 1	South Korea
	Report

Lahore, Pakistan

Event: Triangular Test series
Fifth test match

22 October 1995

Pakistan	2 - 2	Germany
Shahbaz Jr. 12'; Danish 28'	Report	Helweg 52'; Beckmann 55'

Lahore, Pakistan

Event: Triangular Test series
Sixth test match

24 November 1995

Pakistan	1 - 0	Spain
	Report

Brussels, Belgium

Event: Fred Pringiers Memorial Cup
Round-robin first match

25 November 1995

Pakistan	4 - 1	India
	Report

Brussels, Belgium

Event: Fred Pringiers Memorial Cup
Round-robin second match

26 November 1995

Belgium	2 - 3	Pakistan
	Report

Brussels, Belgium

Event: Fred Pringers Memorial Cup
Round-robin third match

19 December 1995

Pakistan	3 - 2	Bangladesh
	Report

Madras, India

Event: 1995 South Asian Games
Round-robin first match

21 December 1995

Pakistan	12 - 0	Sri Lanka
	Report

Madras, India

Event: 1995 South Asian Games
Round-robin second match

24 December 1995

Pakistan	22 - 0	Nepal
	Report

Madras, India

Event: 1995 South Asian Games
Round-robin third match

26 December 1995

India	5 - 2	Pakistan
	Report

Madras, India

Event: 1995 South Asian Games
Round-robin sixth match

=== 1996 ===
7 April 1996

Pakistan	2 - 1	Great Britain
Zaman 23'; Ashraf 40'	Report

Atlanta, United States

Event: Atlanta Pre-Olympics Six Nations
Round-robin first match

10 April 1996

Pakistan	3 - 0	South Korea
Zaman 12', 34'; Shafqat 24'	Report

Atlanta, United States

Event: Atlanta Pre-Olympics Six Nations
Round-robin second match

12 April 1996

Argentina	1 - 4	Pakistan
	Report	Bajwa 12'; Zaman 29'; Raza 54'; Shahbaz Jr. 66'

Atlanta, United States

Event: Atlanta Pre-Olympics Six Nations
Round-robin third match

14 April 1996

United States	1 - 2	Pakistan
Elmaghraby 13'	Report	Zaman 32', 42'

Atlanta, United States

Event: Atlanta Pre-Olympics Six Nations
Round-robin fourth match

17 April 1996

Pakistan	2 - 2	India
Zaman 3'; Sarwar 39'	Report	Saini 41'; Ramandeep 46'

Atlanta, United States

Event: Atlanta Pre-Olympics Six Nations
Round-robin fifth match

13 June 1996

Netherlands	4 - 2	Pakistan
van den Honert 14', 24' de Nooijer 35'; Crucq 58'	Report	Zaman 30', 46'

Buckinghamshire, England

Event: Four Nations Milton Keynes
Round-robin first match

15 June 1996

Pakistan	3 - 2	Great Britain
Anis 1'; Raza 7'; Zaman 64'	Report	Giles 57', 60'

Buckinghamshire, England

Event: Four Nations Milton Keynes
Round-robin second match

16 June 1996

Germany	5 - 1	Pakistan
	Report

Buckinghamshire, England

Event: Four Nations Milton Keynes
Round-robin third match

19 June 1996

Germany	6 - 1	Pakistan
Becker 10', 26', 65', 69'; Domke 44'; Fischer 51'	Report	Shahbaz Jr. 20'

Amstelveen, Netherlands

Event: NCM Four Nations Amstelveen
Round-robin first match

20 June 1996

Netherlands	4 - 3	Pakistan
van den Honert 10'; Veen 18'; Delissen 20'; Bovelander 31'	Report	Shahbaz Jr. 14', 70'; Mujahid 48'

Amstelveen, Netherlands

Event: NCM Four Nations Amstelveen
Round-robin second match

22 June 1996

Pakistan	0 - 1	Great Britain
	Report	Garcia 37'

Amstelveen, Netherlands

Event: NCM Four Nations Amstelveen 1996
Round-robin third match

23 June 1996

Great Britain	0 - 3	Pakistan
	Report	Anis 19', 26'; Shahbaz Jr. 55'

Amstelveen, Netherlands

Event: NCM Four Nations Amstelveen
Third and fourth place

5 July 1996

Canada	2 - 3	Pakistan
	Report

Vancouver, Canada

Event: Test series
First test match

6 July 1996

Canada	3 - 1	Pakistan
	Report

Vancouver, Canada

Event: Test series
Second test match

8 July 1996

Canada	2 - 4	Pakistan
	Report

Vancouver, Canada

Event: Test series
Third test match

20 July 1996

Pakistan	4 - 0	United States
Shahbaz 10'; Ashraf 18', 25'; Zaman 62'	Report

Atlanta, United States

Event: 1996 Summer Olympics
Pool stage

22 July 1996

Pakistan	0 - 3	Spain
	Report	Arnau 22', 43'; Escarré 30'

Atlanta, United States

Event: 1996 Summer Olympics
Pool stage

24 July 1996

Germany	3 - 1	Pakistan
Becker 6', 49'; Meinhardt 39'	Report	Khalid 62'

Atlanta, United States

Event: 1996 Summer Olympics
Pool stage

26 July 1996

Pakistan	0 - 0	India
	Report

Atlanta, United States

Event: 1996 Summer Olympics
Pool stage

28 July 1996

Pakistan	6 - 2	Argentina
Shahbaz Sr. 32', 45', 65'; Sarwar 51', 58'; Zaman 53'	Report	Pérez 24'; J. Lombi 68'

Atlanta, United States

Event: 1996 Summer Olympics
Pool stage

31 July 1996

Great Britain	1 - 2	Pakistan
Giles 7'	Report	Sarwar 11'; Rahim 65'

Atlanta, United States

Event: 1996 Summer Olympics
Cross-over

2 August 1996

South Korea	3 - 1	Pakistan
Jeon Jong-ha 6'; Shin Seok-kyo 35'; Song Seung-tae 68'	Report	Ashraf 7'

Atlanta, United States

Event: 1996 Summer Olympics
Fifth and sixth place

7 December 1996

Pakistan	0 - 2	Netherlands
	Report	Van Pelt 62'; De Nooijer 64'

Madras, India

Event: 1996 Hockey Champions Trophy
Pool stage

8 December 1996

Australia	2 - 4	Pakistan
Choppy 32'; Hiskins 49'	Report	R. Khan 21'; Ashraf 28'; Usman 48'; Raza 52'

Madras, India

Event: 1996 Hockey Champions Trophy
Pool stage

10 December 1996

Pakistan	2 - 2	Spain
Anis 26'; Ashraf 44'	Report	Pujol 63'; Escarré 68'

Madras, India

Event: 1996 Hockey Champions Trophy
Pool stage

12 December 1996

Pakistan	4 - 2	Germany
Ali 12'; Rahim 2', 61'; Ashraf 49'	Report	Bechmann 67'; Helwig 70'

Madras, India

Event: 1996 Hockey Champions Trophy
Pool stage

13 December 1996

Pakistan	3 - 2	India
Ali 6'; Danish 26'; Ashraf 38'	Report	Aldrin 14'; Pargat Singh 50'

Madras, India

Event: 1996 Hockey Champions Trophy
Pool stage

15 December 1996

Netherlands	3 - 2	Pakistan
De Nooijer 9'; Van Pelt 13'; Lomans 20'	Report	Rahim 26'; Usman 28'

Madras, India

Event: 1996 Hockey Champions Trophy
Final

=== 1997 ===
16 March 1997

Pakistan	1 - 1	England
Shahbaz Jr. 35'	Report	Garcia 30'

Karachi, Pakistan

Event: Pakistan Golden Jubilee Cup
Pool stage

18 March 1997

Pakistan	3 - 3	Netherlands
Shahbaz Jr. 5', 48'; Zaman 9'	Report	Lomans 4', 49'; Buma 65'

Karachi, Pakistan

Event: Pakistan Golden Jubilee Cup
Pool stage

20 March 1997

Germany	3 - 3	Pakistan
Michel 31'; Domke 40'; Hollensteiner 65'	Report	Zaman 12'; Shahbaz Jr. 28'; Ashraf 68'

Karachi, Pakistan

Event: Pakistan Golden Jubilee Cup
Pool stage

22 March 1997

Australia	3 - 3	Pakistan
Smith 9'; Hiskin 29'; Davies 40'	Report	Rahim 25'; Khalid 33'; Shahbaz Jr. 62'

Karachi, Pakistan

Event: Pakistan Golden Jubilee Cup
Pool stage

23 March 1997

Pakistan	7 - 4	Australia
	Report

Karachi, Pakistan

Event: Pakistan Golden Jubilee Cup
Third and fourth place

21 May 1997

Australia	2 - 3	Pakistan
	Report

Perth, Australia

Event: Test series
First test match

24 May 1997

Australia	3 - 2	Pakistan
	Report

Adelaide, Australia

Event: Test series
Second test match

25 May 1997

Australia	2 - 1	Pakistan
	Report

Adelaide, Australia

Event: Test series
Third test match

28 May 1997

Australia	2 - 3	Pakistan
	Report

Sydney, Australia

Event: Test series
Fourth test match

31 May 1997

Australia	3 - 2	Pakistan
	Report

Canberra, Australia

Event: Test series
Fifth test match

1 June 1997

Australia	1 - 3	Pakistan
	Report

Melbourne, Australia

Event: Test series
Sixth test match

12 June 1997

Pakistan	3 - 4	England
	Report

Breda, Netherlands

Event: Four Nations Breda
Round-robin first match

13 June 1997

Pakistan	5 - 2	South Africa
	Report

Breda, Netherlands

Event: Four Nations Breda
Round-robin second test match

15 June 1997

Netherlands	4 - 0	Pakistan
van Wijk 26'; Lomans 44', 53'; Veen 67'	Report

Breda, Netherlands

Event: Four Nations Breda
Round-robin third match

17 June 1997

Germany	3 - 0	Pakistan
	Report

Mülheim, Germany

Event: Test match

11 October 1997

Pakistan	1 - 4	Germany
Shahbaz Sr. 25'	Report	Bechmann 14', 50'; Blunck 21', 39'

Adelaide, Australia

Event: 1997 Hockey Champions Trophy
Pool stage

12 October 1997

Australia	5 - 3	Pakistan
Davies 22', 36'; Choppy 40'; Hiskins 47'; Brennan 63'	Report	Khan 9'; Zaman 47'; Kaleem 52'

Adelaide, Australia

Event: 1997 Hockey Champions Trophy
Pool stage

14 October 1997

Pakistan	1 - 3	South Korea
Sarwar 46'	Report	Kang Keon-wook 29', 64'; Yeo Woon-kon 66'

Adelaide, Australia

Event: 1997 Hockey Champions Trophy
Pool stage

16 October 1997

Spain	1 - 1	Pakistan
Ja. Arnau 25'	Report	Kaleem 70'

Adelaide, Australia

Event: 1997 Hockey Champions Trophy
Pool stage

18 October 1997

Netherlands	5 - 2	Pakistan
Van Wijk 1'; De Nooijer 22', 30', 52'; Veen 25'	Report	Ashraf 18', 47'

Adelaide, Australia

Event: 1997 Hockey Champions Trophy
Pool stage

19 October 1997

Pakistan	6 - 2	South Korea
Zaman 16'; Ashraf 19'; Babar 20'; Sarwar 24', 27'; Kaleem 70'	Report	Kang Keon-wook 21'; Song Seung-tae 30'

Adelaide, Australia

Event: 1997 Hockey Champions Trophy
Fifth and sixth place

=== 1998 ===
28 February 1998

Pakistan	4 - 1	India
Ashraf 17', 65'; Shahbaz Sr. 47'; Zaman 62'	Report	Ramandeep 69'

Peshawar, Pakistan

Event: Test series
First test match

1 March 1998

Pakistan	2 - 1	India
Ashraf 16'; Abbas 39'	Report	Pillay 42'

Rawalpindi, Pakistan

Event: Test series
Second test match

5 March 1998

Pakistan	3 - 4	India
Abbas 5', 41'; Ashraf 11'	Report	Harbhajan 1'; Tirkey 10'; Pillay 53'; Dad 56'

Lahore, Pakistan

Event: Test series
Third test match

7 March 1998

Pakistan	0 - 2	India
	Report	Dad 45', 57'

Karachi, Pakistan

Event: Event: Test series
Fourth test match

19 March 1998

India	3 - 2	Pakistan
Virkey 7'; Kumar 20'; Tirkey 60'	Report	Alam 37'; Ashraf 41'

New Delhi, India

Event: Test series
Fifth test

21 March 1998

India	1 - 1	Pakistan
Ferreira 44'	Report	Sarawar 2'

Jalandhar, India

Event: Test series
Sixth test match

24 March 1998

India	1 - 3	Pakistan
Pillay 50'	Report	Alam 13'; Ashraf 22'; Sarwar 53'

Hyderabad, India

Event: Test series
Seventh test match

26 March 1998

India	0 - 2	Pakistan
	Report	Abdullah 44'; Zaman 56'

Chennai, India

Event: Test series
Eighth test match

14 April 1998

Kenya	1 - 3	Pakistan
	Report

Nairobi, Kenya

Event: Test series
First test match

15 April 1998

Kenya	4 - 3	Pakistan
Odendo 23', 65', 69'; Masibo 60'	Report	Bashir 18', 54'; Anis 31'

Nairobi, Kenya

Event: Test series
Second test match

16 May 1998

Belgium	2 - 5	Pakistan
	Report

Brussels, Belgium

Event: Test series
First test match

17 May 1998

Belgium	3 - 3	Pakistan
	Report

Antwerp, Belgium

Event: Test series
Second test match

21 May 1998

Malaysia	2 - 7	Pakistan
Nor Saiful 62', 66'	Report	Khan 7'; Shahbaz Jr. 11'; Shahbaz Sr. 28'; Abbas 33'; Zaman 41'; Ashraf 49'; Bashir 57'

Utrecht, Netherlands

Event: 1998 FIH Hockey World Cup
Pool stage

23 May 1998

Pakistan	7 - 5	England
Bashir 12', 40'; Khan 23'; Ashraf 31', 58'; Shahbaz Jr. 44'; Shahbaz Sr. 63'	Report	Garcia 20'; Giles 26'; Pearn 39'; Wyatt 55', 60'

Utrecht, Netherlands

Event: 1998 FIH Hockey World Cup
Pool stage

25 May 1998

Pakistan	1 - 2	Spain
Abbas 52'	Report	Fábregas 29'; Arnau 35'

Utrecht, Netherlands

Event: 1998 FIH Hockey World Cup
Pool stage

27 May 1998

Pakistan	3 - 1	Poland
Bashir 28'; Ashraf 43', 51'	Report	Grotowski 30'

Utrecht, Netherlands

Event: 1998 FIH Hockey World Cup
Pool stage

28 May 1998

Australia	3 - 1	Pakistan
Stacy 27', 62'; Brennan 34'	Report	Bashir 48'

Utrecht, Netherlands

Event: 1998 FIH Hockey World Cup
Pool stage

30 May 1998

South Korea	1 - 3	Pakistan
Hong 58'	Report	Ashraf 14', 47'; Shahbaz Jr. 53'

Utrecht, Netherlands

Event: 1998 FIH Hockey World Cup
Cross over

1 June 1998

Pakistan	4 - 2	England
Usman 18', 64'; Bashir 46', 50'	Report	Garcia 32'; Giles 38'

Utrecht, Netherlands

Event: 1998 FIH Hockey World Cup
Fifth and sixth place

9 September 1998

Pakistan	5 - 4	Kenya
Yousuf 18', 30', 46', 55'; Khalid 40'	Report	Ondong 26', 31'; Induli 59'; Senghe 62'

Kuala Lumpur, Malaysia

Event: 1998 Commonwealth Games
Pool stage

12 September 1998

Canada	3 - 3	Pakistan
D'Abreo 5'; Milkovich 15', 19'	Report	Anis 30'; Yousuf 38'; Bashir 47'

Kuala Lumpur, Malaysia

Event: 1998 Commonwealth Games
Pool stage

15 September 1998

Pakistan	1 - 1	Malaysia
Raza 52'	Report	Kuhan 15'

Kuala Lumpur, Malaysia

Event: 1998 Commonwealth Games
Pool stage

16 September 1998

Pakistan	2 - 3	England
Raza 7'; Khalid 52'	Report	Sharpe 26', 62', 69'

Kuala Lumpur, Malaysia

Event: 1998 Commonwealth Games
Pool stage

31 October 1998

South Korea	4 - 3	Pakistan
Kim Yong-bae 15', 16'; Kang Keon-wook 45', 52'	Report	Sarwar 4', 35'; Ashraf 63'

Lahore, Pakistan

Event: 1998 Hockey Champions Trophy
Pool stage

1 November 1998

Pakistan	2 - 2	Spain
Abbas 55'; Babar 63'	Report	Sánchez 58'; Escarré 69'

Lahore, Pakistan

Event: 1998 Hockey Champions Trophy
Pool stage

3 November 1998

Pakistan	4 - 4	Australia
Iqbal 35'; Bashir 60', 68'; Abbas 64'	Report	Livermore 9'; Stacy 12', 40'; Elder 66'

Lahore, Pakistan

Event: 1998 Hockey Champions Trophy
Pool stage

4 November 1998

Pakistan	5 - 3	Netherlands
Bashir 21'; Anis 24', 61'; Sarwar 38'; Abbas 53'	Report	Eikelboom 25'; Lomans 41', 64'

Lahore, Pakistan

Event: 1998 Hockey Champions Trophy
Pool stage

6 November 1998

Pakistan	3 - 1	Germany
Hussain 12'; Abbas 55'; Bashir 68'	Report	Kurtz 32'

Lahore, Pakistan

Event: 1998 Hockey Champions Trophy
Pool stage

8 November 1998

Pakistan	1 - 3	Netherlands
Bashir 12'	Report	Lomans 21'; Geeris 32'; Eikelboom 68'

Lahore, Pakistan

Event: 1998 Hockey Champions Trophy
Final

8 December 1998

Pakistan	8 - 0	Thailand
Nadeem 9', 41'; Anis 13', 43'; Bashir 27'; Yousuf 32'; Iqbal 62'	Report

Bangkok, Thailand

Event: 1998 Asian Games
Pool stage

10 December 1998

Pakistan	5 - 0	Hong Kong
	Report

Bangkok, Thailand

Event: 1998 Asian Games
Pool stage

12 December 1998

Pakistan	2 - 1	Malaysia
Bashir 22'; Nadeem 54'	Report	Suhaimi 34'

Bangkok, Thailand

Event: 1998 Asian Games
Pool stage

14 December 1998

Pakistan	1 - 1	Japan
Abbas 33'	Report	Katayama 24'

Bangkok, Thailand

Event: 1998 Asian Games
Pool stage

17 December 1998

South Korea	3 - 2	Pakistan
Yong-keun 18'; Woon-gon 26'; Keon-wook 32'	Report	Abbas 5', 52'

Bangkok, Thailand

Event: 1998 Asian Games
Semi-final

19 December 1998

Pakistan	3 - 0	Japan
Abbas 11', 43'; Nadeem 57'	Report

Bangkok, Thailand

Event: 1998 Asian Games
Third and fourth place

=== 1999 ===
3 February 1999

India	3 - 4 (a.e.t.)	Pakistan
Gagan 25', 64'; Dad 52'	Report	Abbas 10', 33'; Nadeem 40'; Bashir 85'

New Delhi, India

Event: Test series
First test match

5 February 1999

India	1 - 4	Pakistan
Gagan 2'	Report	Asim 7'; Irfan 42'; Abbas 64', 65'

Bhopal, India

Event: Test series
Second test match

8 February 1999

India	2 - 5	Pakistan
Dhillon 19', 59'	Report	Irfan 4', 31'; Abbas 10'; Bashir 44', 48'

Hyderabad, India

Event: Test series
Third test match

10 February 1999

India	3 - 0	Pakistan
Chuahan 3', 53'; Dhillon 18'	Report

Chennai, India

Event: Test series
Fourth test match

16 February 1999

Pakistan	4 - 2	India
Bashir 20'; Abbas 25', 69'; Khalid 39'	Report	Saini 50'; Dhillon 56'

Lahore, Pakistan

Event: Test series
Fifth test match

18 February 1999

Pakistan	4 - 2	India
Bashir 10'; Asim 17', 34'; Sarwar 58'	Report	Horo 62'; Dhillon 64'

Karachi, Pakistan

Event: Test series
Sixth test match

20 February 1999

Pakistan	1 - 2	India
Abbas 38'	Report	Dhillon 13'; Chauhan 36'

Peshawar, Pakistan

Event: Test series
Seventh test match

22 February 1999

Pakistan	3 - 3 (a.e.t.)	India
Bashir 49'; Abbas 66'; Khalid 67'	Report	Dhillon 25', 59'; Gagan 69'
Penalties
	11-10

Rawalpindi, Pakistan

Event: Test series
Eighth test match

24 February 1999

Pakistan	2 - 3	India
Abbas 9'; Khalid 14'	Report	Tirkey 37'; Saini 53'; Dhillon 66'

Lahore, Pakistan

Event: Test series
Ninth test match

2 April 1999

Pakistan	6 - 3	Canada
Bashir 10', 20', 37', 52'; Abbas 24', 46'	Report

Kuala Lumpur, Malaysia

Event: 1999 Sultan Azlan Shah Cup
Pool stage

4 April 1999

South Korea	2 - 6	Pakistan
Seung-tae 11'; Keon-wook 52'	Report	Abbas 5', 41'; Sarwar 17'; Bashir 45'; Shahbaz Jr. 46', 66'

Kuala Lumpur, Malaysia

Event: 1999 Sultan Azlan Shah Cup
Pool stage

5 April 1999

Pakistan	5 - 2	New Zealand
Abbas 24', 53', 59'; Sarwar 51'; Bashir 63'	Report	Radonovich 22'; Hari 38'

Kuala Lumpur, Malaysia

Event: 1999 Sultan Azlan Shah Cup
Pool stage

7 April 1999

Malaysia	1 - 5	Pakistan
Shanmuganathan 40'	Report	Asim 5'; Shahbaz Jr. 23'; Abbas 47', 60'; Hussain 37'

Kuala Lumpur, Malaysia

Event: 1999 Sultan Azlan Shah Cup
Pool stage

8 April 1999

Pakistan	4 - 2	Germany
Abbas 18', 43'; Sarwar 19'; Shahbaz Jr. 65'	Report	Michel 39', 47'

Kuala Lumpur, Malaysia

Event: 1999 Sultan Azlan Shah Cup
Pool stage

10 April 1999

Pakistan	3 - 1	South Korea
Abbas 30'; Saqlain 61'; Shahbaz Jr. 64'	Report	Woon-kon 19'

Kuala Lumpur, Malaysia

Event: 1999 Sultan Azlan Shah Cup
Final

10 June 1999

Spain	1 - 1	Pakistan
Iglesias 57'	Report	Sarwar 40'

Brisbane, Australia

Event: 1999 Hockey Champions Trophy
Pool stage

12 June 1999

Pakistan	2 - 2	Netherlands
Bashir 26'; Sarwar 39'	Report	Van Wijk 23'; Eikelboom 68'

Brisbane, Australia

Event: 1999 Hockey Champions Trophy
Pool stage

13 June 1999

South Korea	2 - 2	Pakistan
Yeo Woon-kon 21'; Kang Keon-wook 60'	Report	Abbas 5'; Hussain 25'

Brisbane, Australia

Event: 1999 Hockey Champions Trophy
Pool stage

16 June 1999

Pakistan	0 - 2	England
	Report	Wyatt 30'; Wallis 42'

Brisbane, Australia

Event: 1999 Hockey Champions Trophy
Pool stage

18 June 1999

Pakistan	2 - 1	Australia
Abbas 16'; Sarwar 56'	Report	Elder 8'

Brisbane, Australia

Event: 1999 Hockey Champions Trophy
Pool stage

20 June 1999

England	4 - 3 (a.e.t.)	Pakistan
Wallis 24', 79'; Pearn 39'; Crutchley 47'	Report	Bashir 16'; Abbas 21', 49'

Brisbane, Australia

Event: 1999 Hockey Champions Trophy
Fifth and sixth place

11 August 1999

Germany	4 - 4	Pakistan
Michel 9'; Weißenborn 33'; Köpp 48'; Bechmann 64'	Report	Anis 3'; Abbas 12', 16'; Sarwar 53'

Amstelveen, Netherlands

Event: Four Nations Amstelveen
Pool stage

12 August 1999

Pakistan	3 - 6	Spain
	Report

Amstelveen, Netherlands

Event: Four Nations Amstelveen
Pool stage

14 August 1999

Netherlands	4 - 6	Pakistan
	Report

Amstelveen, Netherlands

Event: Four Nations Amstelveen 1999
Pool stage

15 August 1999

Netherlands	4 - 2	Pakistan
Lomans 15', 22', 32'; Nooijer 38'	Report	Abbas 18', 29'

Amstelveen, Netherlands

Event: Four Nations Amstelveen 1999
Final

17 August 1999

Switzerland	3 - 6	Pakistan
Steinmann 45', 70'; Cavallet 55'	Report	Sarwar 15', 68'; Bashir 42'; Abbas 47', 59', 65'

Lugano, Switzerland

Event: Test series
First test match

18 August 1999

Switzerland	4 - 4	Pakistan
Lesssert 18'; Schmidli 49', 65'; Steinmann 63'	Report	Danish 13', 61'; Anis 52'; Rahim 53'

Lausanne, Switzerland

Event: Test series
Second test match

20 August 1999

Pakistan	8 - 2	France
	Report

Wettingen, Switzerland

Event: Four Nations Wettingen
Round-robin first match

21 August 1999

Switzerland	4 - 8	Pakistan
	Report

Wettingen, Switzerland

Event: Four Nations Wettingen
Round-robin second match

22 August 1999

Germany	2 - 1	Pakistan
	Report

Wettingen, Switzerland

Event: Four Nations Wettingen
Round-robin third match

19 November 1999

Pakistan	15 - 0	Sri Lanka
Abbas 2', 11', 20', 38', 42', 48', 55'; Iqbal 9', 23'; Bashir 17', 39', 44'; Sarwar 60'; Jawad 62'; Raza 67'	Report

Kuala Lumpur, Malaysia

Event: 1999 Hockey Asia Cup
Pool stage

21 November 1999

Pakistan	10 - 1	China
Sarwar 8', 21', 46'; Abbas 19', 42', 50', 61'; Bashir 11'; Iqbal 37'; Anis 39'	Report	Wang 14'

Kuala Lumpur, Malaysia

Event: 1999 Hockey Asia Cup
Pool stage

23 November 1999

Pakistan	6 - 0	Bangladesh
Anis 10', 45'; Abbas 17', 25', 63'; Nadeem 30'	Report

Kuala Lumpur, Malaysia

Event: 1999 Hockey Asia Cup
Pool stage

24 November 1999

Pakistan	1 - 0	South Korea
Abbas 61'	Report

Kuala Lumpur, Malaysia

Event: 1999 Hockey Asia Cup
Pool stage

26 November 1999

Pakistan	3 - 2 (a.e.t.)	Malaysia
Anis 27', 49'; Abbas 74'	Report	Nawawi 4'; Shanmuganathan 67'

Kuala Lumpur, Malaysia

Event: 1999 Hockey Asia Cup
Semi-final

28 November 1999

South Korea	5 - 4	Pakistan
Jong-hyun 13', 16'; Woon-kon 53'; Jong-ha 60'; Seong-tae 65'	Report	Iqbal 9'; Sarwar 22'; Raza 25'; Jawad 42'

Kuala Lumpur, Malaysia

Event: 1999 Hockey Asia Cup
Final

== Head-to-head record ==
Won more matches than lost
Won equal matches to lost
Lost more matches than won

Opponent	GP	W	D	L	GF	GA	First meeting	Last meeting
Germany	43	10	9	24	76	110	1990	1999
Netherlands	33	15	4	14	72	84	1990	1999
Australia	27	13	4	10	71	66	1990	1999
India	26	14	3	9	62	52	1990	1999
South Korea	19	8	3	8	55	38	1990	1999
Spain	18	11	4	3	46	27	1990	1999
Great Britain	14	10	2	2	34	18	1990	1996
Malaysia	14	12	2	0	64	25	1990	1999
England	13	3	2	8	27	32	1990	1999
France	8	8	0	0	63	11	1991	1999
Canada	6	4	1	1	18	13	1990	1999
New Zealand	6	5	1	0	20	6	1991	1999
Argentina	6	5	0	1	16	6	1991	1996
Japan	5	4	1	0	25	2	1990	1998
Ireland	5	5	0	0	14	2	1990	1993
Soviet Union	4	4	0	0	22	9	1990	1992
China	3	3	0	0	20	1	1990	1999
Switzerland	3	2	1	0	18	11	1999	1999
Kenya	3	2	0	1	11	9	1998	1998
Belgium	3	2	1	0	11	7	1995	1998
South Africa	3	3	0	0	12	3	1994	1997
Bangladesh	2	2	0	0	9	2	1995	1999
Sri Lanka	2	2	0	0	27	0	1995	1999
Hong Kong	2	2	0	0	19	0	1990	1998
Thailand	2	2	0	0	28	0	1993	1998
United States	2	2	0	0	6	1	1996	1996
Cuba	2	0	1	1	2	3	1993	1993
Wales	2	2	0	0	10	1	1991	1991
Poland	1	1	0	0	3	1	1998	-
Nepal	1	1	0	0	22	0	1995	-
Belarus	1	1	0	0	2	0	1994	-
Oman	1	1	0	0	8	0	1994	-
Kazakhstan	1	1	0	0	3	1	1994	-
Scotland	1	1	0	0	5	1	1991	-
