= Pakistan at the 1996 Summer Olympics =

- IOC code: PAK
- NOC: National Olympic Committee of Pakistan
- Website: www.nocpakistan.org

in Atlanta
- Competitors: 24 in 5 sports
- Flag bearer: Mansoor Ahmed
- Medals: Gold 0 Silver 0 Bronze 0 Total 0

Summer Olympics appearances (overview)
- 1948; 1952; 1956; 1960; 1964; 1968; 1972; 1976; 1980; 1984; 1988; 1992; 1996; 2000; 2004; 2008; 2012; 2016; 2020; 2024

Pakistan competed at the 1996 Summer Olympics in Atlanta, United States.

== Results by event ==
=== Athletics ===
Women's long jump

- Shabana Akhtar

- Qualifying round Group B; 5.80m (→ did not advance, finished 16th out of 17 in group)

Shabana Akhtar became the first Pakistani woman to participate in the Olympic Games

Men's hammer throw

- Aqarab Abbas

- Qualifying round Group B; 65.60m (→ did not advance, finished 16th out of 18 in group)

=== Boxing ===
Men's Light Flyweight (– 48 kg)

- Abdul Rashid Qambrani

- 1/16 elimination; Lost to Oleg Kiryukhin (UKR) on pts 17:3

Men's Light Welterweight (– 63.5 kg)

- Usmanullah Khan

- 1/16 elimination; Lost to Nordine Mouchi (FRA) KO in rd 1

Men's Welterweight (– 67 kg)

- Abdul Rasheed Baloch

- 1/16 elimination; Beat Jesús Flores (MEX) on pts 12:7
- 1/8 elimination; Lost to Nurzhan Smanov (KAZ) on pts 13:9

Men's Super Heavyweight (+ 91 kg)

- Safarish Khan

- 1/16 elimination; Bye
- 1/8 elimination; Lost to Duncan Dokiwari (NGR) RSC in rd 2

=== Hockey ===
==== Men's team competition ====
Preliminaries Group A

- Defeated United States (4-0)
- Lost to Spain (0-3)
- Lost to Germany (1-3)
- Drew with India (0-0)
- Defeated Argentina (6-2)

Classification matches

- 5th-8th places; Defeated Great Britain (2-1)
- 5th-6th place; Lost to South Korea (1-3)

Pakistan finished 6th

Team Roster

- Mansoor Ahmed (gk) (captain)
- Tahir Zaman (vice-captain)
- Khalid Mahmood (gk)
- Naveed Alam
- Rana Mujahid
- Danish Kaleem
- Mohammad Usman
- Mohammad Khalid Sr
- Shafqat Malik
- Irfan Mahmood
- Muhammad Sarwar
- Rahim Khan
- Aleem Raza
- Shahbaz Ahmed
- Mohammad Shahbaz
- Kamran Ashraf

=== Swimming ===
Men's 100 metres butterfly

- Kamal Salman Masud

- Heat 1; 58.59 (→ did not advance)

=== Wrestling Freestyle ===
Men's 90 kg

- Mohammad Bashir Bhola Bhala

- Round 1; Lost to Makharbek Khadartsev (RUS) on pts 10:0
