= 1991 Men's Hockey Champions Trophy =

Tournament details
- Host country: Germany
- City: Berlin
- Dates: 13–22 September
- Teams: 6 (from 3 confederations)
- Venue(s): Olympiastadion

Final positions
- Champions: Germany (4th title)
- Runner-up: Pakistan
- Third place: Netherlands

Tournament statistics
- Matches played: 15
- Goals scored: 57 (3.8 per match)
- Top scorer(s): (Netherlands) Floris Jan Bovelander (Pakistan) Khalid Bashir (7 goals)

The 1991 Men's Hockey Champions Trophy was the 13th edition of the Hockey Champions Trophy, an international men's field hockey tournament organized by the FIH. It took place from 12 to 22 September 1991 in the Olympiastadion in Berlin, Germany.

The hosts Germany won their fourth title by finishing first in the round-robin tournament. This was the last major tournament appearance by the Soviet Union.

== Results ==
All times are Central European Summer Time (UTC+02:00)

=== Pool ===
Team	Pld	W	D	L	GF	GA	GD	Pts
Germany	5	3	2	0	12	8	+4	8
Pakistan	5	3	1	1	14	8	+6	7
Netherlands	5	2	1	2	12	10	+2	5
Australia	5	2	1	2	8	8	0	5
Great Britain	5	1	2	2	4	6	−2	4
Soviet Union	5	0	1	4	7	19	−12	1

13 September 1991
19:00

Germany	4–3	Pakistan
Meinhardt 8', 38'; Becker 24'; Blunck 52'	Report	Ibrahim 12'; Shahbaz 15'; Bashir 48'

Umpires:
Peter von Reth (NED)
Patrick van Beneden (BEL)

14 September 1991
17:00

Soviet Union	1–2	Great Britain
Vitali 41'	Report	Thompson 19'; Kerly 36'

Umpires:
Gary Belder (AUS)
Richard Wolter (GER)

14 September 1991
19:00

Pakistan	2–1	Australia
Bashir 23', 66'	Report	Stacy 8'

Umpires:
Claude Seidler (GER)
Nikolai Stepanov (URS)

15 September 1991
15:00

Netherlands	0–3	Germany
	Report	Saliger 16'; Fischer 52', 67'

Umpires:
Patrick van Beneden (BEL)
Antonio Morales (ESP)

15 September 1991
19:00

Soviet Union	1–3	Australia
Pleshakov 61'	Report	Wansbrough 11', 36'; Carey 13'

Umpires:
M Iqbal Bali (PAK)
Richard Wilson (ENG)

16 September 1991
19:00

Netherlands	3–1	Great Britain
Bovelander 14', 22', 56'	Report	Kerly 20'

Umpires:
Nikolai Stepanov (URS)
Richard Wolter (GER)

17 September 1991
19:00

Australia	0–0	Great Britain
	Report

Umpires:
Peter von Reth (NED)
M Iqbal Bali (PAK)

18 September 1991
19:00

Netherlands	1–1	Pakistan
Van den Honert 46'	Report	Bashir 69'

Umpires:
Richard Wilson (ENG)
Claude Seidler (GER)

19 September 1991
14:00

Great Britain	1–1	Germany
Thompson 33'	Report	Blunck 44'

Umpires:
Peter von Reth (NED)
Antonio Morales (ESP)

19 September 1991
19:00

Pakistan	7–2	Soviet Union
Musaddiz 5', 25', 27'; Bashir 28', 64'; Qamar 43', 60'	Report	Ioultchiev 45'; Berig 47'

Umpires:
Patrick van Beneden (BEL)
Gary Belder (AUS)

20 September 1991
15:00

Australia	4–3	Netherlands
Reid 4'; Wansbrough 14'; Lewis 22'; Bodimeade 35'	Report	Bovelander 9'; Veen 26'; Weterings 38'

Umpires:
Richard Wilson (ENG)
Richard Wolter (GER)

20 September 1991
19:00

Germany	2–2	Soviet Union
Becker 33'; Meinhardt 70'	Report	Hayrapetyan 49'; Pleshakov 56'

Umpires:
M Iqbal Bali (PAK)
Gary Belder (AUS)

21 September 1991
19:00

Great Britain	0–1	Pakistan
	Report	Bashir 5'

Umpires:
Nikolai Stepanov (URS)
Antonio Morales (ESP)

22 September 1991
13:00

Soviet Union	1–5	Netherlands
Pleshakov 28'	Report	Bovelander 38', 45', 61'; Parlevliet 56'; Van den Honert 65'

Umpires:
Claude Seidler (GER)
M Iqbal Bali (PAK)

22 September 1991
15:00

Australia	0–2	Germany
	Report	Becker 8', 50'

Umpires:
Peter von Reth (NED)
Patrick van Beneden (BEL)

== Statistics ==
=== Final standings ===
1. Germany
2. Pakistan
3. Netherlands
4. Australia
5. Great Britain
6. Soviet Union

=== Goalscorers ===
There were 57 goals scored in 15 matches, for an average of 3.8 goals per match.

7 goals

- (Netherlands) Floris Jan Bovelander
- (Pakistan) Khalid Bashir

4 goals

- (Germany) Andreas Becker

3 goals

- (Australia) David Wansbrough
- (Germany) Sven Meinhardt
- (Pakistan) Qamar Ibrahim
- (Pakistan) Musaddiq Hussain
- (Soviet Union) Sergei Pleshakov

2 goals

- (Germany) Christian Blunck
- (Germany) Carsten Fischer
- (United Kingdom) Sean Kerly
- (United Kingdom) Nick Thompson
- (Netherlands) Taco van den Honert

1 goal

- (Australia) Lee Bodimeade
- (Australia) Ashley Carey
- (Australia) Paul Lewis
- (Australia) Graham Reid
- (Australia) Jay Stacy
- (Germany) Stefan Saliger
- (Netherlands) Erik Parlevliet
- (Netherlands) Stephan Veen
- (Netherlands) Gijs Weterings
- (Pakistan) Shahbaz Ahmed
- (Soviet Union) Sos Airapetyan
- (Soviet Union) Vitali Holopov
- (Soviet Union) Igor Ioultchiev
- (Soviet Union) Berig Seksembal

Source: FIH
