= 1992 Men's Hockey Champions Trophy =

Field hockey tournament

Tournament details
- Host country: Pakistan
- City: Karachi
- Dates: 20–28 February
- Teams: 6
- Venue: National Hockey Stadium

Final positions
- Champions: Germany (5th title)
- Runner-up: Australia
- Third place: Pakistan

Tournament statistics
- Matches played: 18
- Goals scored: 81 (4.5 per match)
- Top scorer: (Australia) Stephen Davies (8 goals)

The 1992 Men's Champions Trophy was the 14th edition of the Hockey Champions Trophy men's field hockey tournament. It took place from February 20–28, 1992 in the National Hockey Stadium in Karachi, Pakistan.

== Results ==
All times are Pakistan Time (UTC+05:00)

=== Pool ===
Team	Pld	W	D	L	GF	GA	GD	Pts
Australia	5	4	0	1	21	8	+13	8
Germany	5	4	0	1	13	8	+5	8
Pakistan	5	3	0	2	12	5	+7	6
Netherlands	5	3	0	2	12	9	+3	6
Great Britain	5	1	0	4	9	14	−5	2
France	5	0	0	5	4	27	−23	0

20 February 1992
14:00

Pakistan	1–0	Great Britain
Shahbaz 68'	Report

Umpires:
J Gotazar (ESP)
Nikolai Stepanov (CIS)

20 February 1992
16:30

Australia	2–1	Germany
Hager 32'; Davies 47'	Report	Michler 62'

Umpires:
Guillaume Langle (FRA)
Khizar Bajwa (PAK)

20 February 1992
19:15

Netherlands	4–0	France
Bovelander 47'; Brinkman 50'; Veen 51'; Delissen 56'	Report

Umpires:
Allan Schasser (AUS)
Richard Wolter (GER)

21 February 1992
17:00

Australia	6–3	Netherlands
Hager 11', 42', 57'; Davies 18', 43'; Williams 35'	Report	Bovelander 37'; Weterings 48'; Klein 51'

Umpires:
Richard Wolter (GER)
M Iqbal Bali (PAK)

21 February 1992
19:15

France	0–6	Pakistan
	Report	Feroz 17', 27'; Bashir 21'; Musaddiq 56'; Zaman 60'; Qamar 70'

Umpires:
Alan Waterman (CAN)
Seif Ahmed (EGY)

22 February 1992
14:00

Germany	3–2	Great Britain
Meinhardt 27', 43'; Fried 66'	Report	Lee 12', 36'

Umpires:
Seif Ahmed (EGY)
Allan Schasser (AUS)

23 February 1992
14:00

Netherlands	1–0	Pakistan
Van den Honert 70'	Report

Umpires:
Nikolai Stepanov (CIS)
Guillaume Langle (FRA)

23 February 1992
16:30

Australia	4–1	Great Britain
Corbitt 19', 39'; Davies 33'; Reid 42'	Report	Williams 42'

Umpires:
Alan Waterman (CAN)
M Iqbal Bali (PAK)

23 February 1992
19:15

Germany	3–1	France
Tewes 45', 70'; Becker 52'	Report	Ponthieu 34'

Umpires:
Khizar Bajwa (PAK)
J Gotazar (ESP)

24 February 1992
16:00

Pakistan	2–0	Australia
Shahbaz 24'; Qamar 50'	Report

Umpires:
Richard Wolter (GER)
Guillaume Langle (FRA)

25 February 1992
14:45

Germany	2–0	Netherlands
Blunck 9'; Meinhardt 18'	Report

Umpires:
Alan Waterman (CAN)
J Gotazar (ESP)

25 February 1992
17:00

Great Britain	5–2	France
Grimley 19', 42', 51'; Potter 26'; Lee 31'	Report	Saguez 24'; Ponthieu 55'

Umpires:
Seif Ahmed (EGY)
Allan Schasser (AUS)

26 February 1992
14:45

Australia	9–1	France
Hager 6'; Davies 9', 32', 47', 65'; Reid 15', 43'; Williams 49'; Lewis 52'	Report	Feix 68'

Umpires:
Nikolai Stepanov (CIS)
Khizar Bajwa (PAK)

26 February 1992
17:00

Netherlands	4–1	Great Britain
Bovelander 3', 15', 42'; Weterings 42'	Report	Clift 69'

Umpires:
J Gotazar (ESP)
M Iqbal Bali (PAK)

26 February 1992
19:15

Germany	4–3	Pakistan
Michler 12'; Blunck 25', 56'; Fischer 51'	Report	Zaman 8'; Bashir 39', 63'

Umpires:
Guillaume Langle (FRA)
Alan Waterman (CAN)

=== Classification ===
==== Fifth and sixth place ====
28 February 1992
10:00

Great Britain	3–0	France
Clift 57'; Nicklin 63'; Kerly 69'	Report

Umpires:
Alan Waterman (CAN)
Nikolai Stepanov (CIS)

==== Third and fourth place ====
28 February 1992
13:15

Pakistan	2–1	Netherlands
Bashir 11'; Shahbaz 60'	Report	Weterings 19'

Umpires:
Richard Wolter (GER)
Seif Ahmed (EGY)

==== Final ====
28 February 1992
16:15

Germany	4–0	Australia
Becker 26', 29', 33', 69'	Report

Umpires:
Guillaume Langle (FRA)
J Gotazar (ESP)

== Final standings ==
1. Germany
2. Australia
3. Pakistan
4. Netherlands
5. Great Britain
6. France
