= Field hockey in Pakistan =

- Country: Pakistan
- Governing body: Pakistan Hockey Federation
- National team: Pakistan

National competitions
- National Hockey Championship

International competitions
- List: Olympics: 3 (1960, 1968, 1984); World Cup: 4 (1971, 1978, 1982, 1994)

Field hockey in Pakistan refers to two teams, the Pakistan men's national field hockey team and the Pakistan women's national field hockey team.

== History ==
The game of field hockey was originally brought to areas of now Pakistan during the British Raj, and like cricket, it became a popular sport among the local population. The Pakistan Hockey Federation came into being in 1948, following the independence of Pakistan in 1947. Prior to this, players from what is now Pakistan had competed internationally alongside players from what is now India. In the beginning, the federation's membership included the provincial hockey federations of West Punjab, Sindh, Balochistan, Khyber-Pakhtunkhwa, Bahawalpur, East Bengal, and the Pakistani Armed Forces Sports Board.

Pakistan played their first international game in London when they defeated Belgium 2-1 at the 14th Olympic Games on 2 August 1948. The first president of PHF was Ghazanfar Ali Khan, with Baseer Ali Sheikh as the Honorary Secretary.The Pakistan national side soon established a strong reputation in international competition, helping to maintain interest in the game in Pakistan which assisted the growth of the federation. However, no full-time central office or secretariat, as such, was established until the 1960s. The office of the Pakistan Hockey Federation, located at the National Hockey Stadium was developed into a secretariat in 1971. It was during the second term as president of Air Marshal (Retd) Nur Khan from 1978 that Pakistani hockey entered a golden age. National senior, national Junior and women hockey teams were all competing internationally. On the personal initiative of Air Marshal (Retd) Nur Khan, the FIH introduced the World Cup and the Champions Trophy, which rated among field hockey's major international tournaments alongside the Olympics.

However, the 1976 Olympics in Montreal had seen the introduction of artificial turf to international hockey competitions. Pakistan was unable to build many artificial turf pitches compared to the European sides, and thus the strength of the national side began declining slowly.

== Domestic competitions ==
The National Hockey Championship has served as the premier domestic cup competition of Pakistan since 1948.

A franchise based Pakistan Super Hockey League was held in 2005.

== Competitions won ==
=== Olympics ===
- 1960 Summer Olympics, Rome
- 1968 Summer Olympics, Mexico
- 1984 Summer Olympics, Los Angeles

=== World Cup ===
- 1971 Hockey World Cup, Spain
- 1978 Hockey World Cup, Argentina
- 1982 Hockey World Cup, India
- 1994 Hockey World Cup, Australia

=== Champions Trophy ===
- 1978 Hockey Champions Trophy, Pakistan
- 1980 Hockey Champions Trophy, Pakistan
- 1994 Hockey Champions Trophy, Pakistan

== National teams ==
- Pakistan men's national field hockey team
- Pakistan women's national field hockey team

=== Men's ranking ===
FIH World Rankings as of 5 August 2026.
Rank	Change	Team	Points
10	Steady	Ireland	2795.27
11	Steady	New Zealand	2736.73
12	▲1	Pakistan	2549.86
13	▼1	South Africa	2541.82
14	Steady	Malaysia	2451.93

=== Women's ranking ===
FIH Women's World Rankings as of 4 August 2026.
Rank	Change	Team	Points
54	▲1	Tonga	1179.5
55	▲1	Hungary	1176.23
56	▲1	Pakistan	1172
57	▼14	Puerto Rico	1153
58	Steady	Slovenia	1145.9

== Notable players ==
- Manzoor Hussain
- Shahbaz Ahmed
- Nasir Ali
- Brig. Khalid Mukhtar Farani, SI(M)
- Islah-ud-din
- Tahir Zaman
- Hassan Sardar
- Samiullah Khan
- Kaleemullah Khan
- Shahid Ali Khan
- Waseem Feroz
- Waseem Ahmed
- Munawwaruz Zaman
- Tariq Mehmood
- Kamran Ashraf
- Sohail Abbas
- Haider Hussain
- Maqsood Hussain
- Mahmood Hussain
- Shahnaz Sheikh
- Mohammed Saqlain
- Zeeshan Ashraf
- Muhammad Waqas
- Naeem Tahir
- Tariq Sheikh
- Asif Bajwa
- Aleem Raza
- Anis Ahmed
- Zahid Pirzada
- Hanif Khan
- Naseer Bunda
- Akhtar Rasool
- Khalid Mahmood
- Naveed Alam
- Muhammad Saqlain

== See also ==
- Pakistan Hockey Federation
