= 1999 India–Pakistan field hockey test series =

1999 India-Pakistan field hockey test series
Tournament details
- City: New Delhi, Bhopal, Hyderabad, Chennai; Lahore, Karachi, Peshawar, Rawalpindi
- Dates: 3 February 1999 - 24 February 1999
- Venue: 8 in 8 host cities

Final positions
- Champions: Pakistan won the series 5-3

Tournament statistics
- Matches played: 9
- Top scorer: (Pakistan) Sohail Abbas (10 goals)

The 1999 Indo-Pak series (known as the Pepsi hockey series for sponsorship reasons) was the 6th series of bilateral field hockey matches between India and Pakistan.

The series consisted of nine matches with India hosting the first leg of four matches and Pakistan hosting the second leg of five matches from 3 February 1999 to 24 February 1999.

Pakistan won the series 5–3.

Sohail Abbas, Pakistan's world renowned 'King of the drag flick', was the top scorer on both sides, netting 10 goals, and scoring at least once in six of the nine matches.

== Background ==
India went into the series as Asian Games Champions having defeated South Korea in the final of the 1998 Asian Games in December the previous year. Pakistan had been runner-ups in the 1998 Champions Trophy in Lahore a month before that.

== Venues ==
Match	Location	Stadium Name	Date
First	New Delhi	Dhyan Chand National Stadium	3 February
Second	Bhopal	Aish Bag Stadium	5 February
Third	Hyderabad	Begumpeth Hockey Stadium	8 February
Fourth	Chennai	Mayor Radhakrishnan Stadium	10 February
Fifth	Lahore	National Hockey Stadium	16 February
Sixth	Karachi	Hockey Club of Pakistan	18 February
Seventh	Peshawar	Lala Ayub Stadium	20 February
Eighth	Rawalpindi	Army Stadium	22 February
Ninth	Lahore	National Hockey Stadium	24 February

== Squads ==
India	Pakistan
Anil Aldrin (C); Jagdish Poonappa (GK); B. C. Poonacha (GK); P. U. Boppanna (GK); Dilip Tirkey; Lazarus Barla; Baljit Singh Saini; Mohammed Riaz; Ramandeep Singh; Thirumal Valavan; Shanmugham Pandurangan; L. Prabhakaran; Sameer Dad; Gagan Ajit Singh; Daljit Singh Dhillon; Rajesh Chauhan; Ravinder Singh; Gurusevak Singh; Kamal Horo; Surinder Singh; Deepak Thakur; Sarabjit Singh; Baljit Singh Dhillon	Atif Bashir (C); Muhammad Qasim (GK); Ahmad Alam (GK); Sohail Abbas; Aamir Saleem; Muhamad Danish Kaleem; Irfan Yousaf; Muhammad Saqlain; Waseem Ahmed; Asad Qureshi; Mubashir Mukhtar; Muhammad Irfan; Ejaz Rasool; Muhammad Nadeem; Muhammad Anis Ahmed; Muhammad Sarwar; Muhammad Khalid; Naveed Asim
Coach (India) Vasudevan Bhaskaran	Coach (Pakistan) Shahnaz Sheikh

== Results ==
- Pakistan won the series 5-3

First Leg
Match	Date	Score	Location
1	3 February	India 3-4 (AET) Pakistan	New Delhi
2	5 February	India 1-4 Pakistan	Bhopal
3	8 February	India 2-5 Pakistan	Hyderabad
4	10 February	India 3-0 Pakistan	Chennai

Second Leg
Match	Date	Score	Location
1	16 February	Pakistan 4-2 India	Lahore
2	18 February	Pakistan 4-2 India	Karachi
3	20 February	Pakistan 1-2 India	Peshawar
4	22 February	Pakistan 3-3 (11-10 p.s.o) India	Rawalpindi
5	24 February	Pakistan 2-3 India	Lahore

== Matches ==
=== First leg ===
Match 1

3 February 1999

India	3 - 4 (AET)	Pakistan
Gagan 25', 64'; Dad 52'	Report	Abbas 10', 33'; Nadeem 40'; Bashir 85'

Dhyan Chand National Stadium, New Delhi
Attendance: 15,000
Umpires:
Hamish Jamson (ENG)

David Gentles (AUS)

Match 2

5 February 1999

India	1 - 4	Pakistan
Gagan 2'	Report	Asim 7'; Irfan 42'; Abbas 64', 65'

Aishbagh Stadium, Bhopal
Attendance: 12,000
Umpires:
Hamish Jamson (ENG) David Gentles (AUS)

Match 3

8 February 1999

India	2 - 5	Pakistan
Dhillon 19', 59'	Report	Irfan 4', 31'; Abbas 10'; Bashir 44', 48'

Begumpeth Hockey Stadium, Hyderabad
Umpires:
Hamish Jamson (ENG) David Gentles (AUS)

Match 4

10 February 1999

India	3 - 0	Pakistan
Chuahan 3', 53'; Dhillon 18'	Report

Mayor Radhakrishnan Stadium, Chennai
Umpires:
Hamish Jamson (ENG) David Gentles (AUS)

=== Second leg ===
Match 1

16 February 1999

Pakistan	4 - 2	India
Bashir 20'; Abbas 25', 69'; Khalid 39'	Report	Saini 50'; Dhillon 56'

National Hockey Stadium, Lahore
Attendance: 12,000
Umpires:
Poudfoot Garth (RSA) Philip Schellekens (NED)

Match 2

18 February 1999

Pakistan	4 - 2	India
Bashir 10'; Asim 17', 34'; Sarwar 58'	Report	Horo 62'; Dhillon 64'

Hockey Club of Pakistan, Karachi
Umpires:
Poudfoot Garth (RSA) Philip Schellekens (NED)

Match 3

20 February 1999

Pakistan	1 - 2	India
Abbas 38'	Report	Dhillon 13'; Chauhan 36'

Lala Ayub Stadium, Peshawar
Attendance: 8,000
Umpires:
Poudfoot Garth (RSA) Philip Schellekens (NED)

Match 4

22 February 1999

Pakistan	3 - 3	India
Bashir 49'; Abbas 66'; Khalid 67'	Report	Dhillon 25', 59'; Gagan 69'
Penalties
	11-10

Army Stadium, Rawalpindi
Attendance: 10,000
Umpires:
Poudfoot Garth (RSA) Philip Schellekens (NED)

Match 5

24 February 1999

Pakistan	2 - 3	India
Abbas 9'; Khalid 14'	Report	Tirkey 37'; Saini 53'; Dhillon 66'

National Hockey Stadium, Lahore
Attendance: 15,000
Umpires:
Poudfoot Garth (RSA) Philip Schellekens (NED)

== Statistics ==
Pakistan - Total goals scored 27

India - Total goals scored 21

=== Goalscorers ===
There were 48 goals scored in 9 matches for an average of 5.33 goals per match

10 goals

- (Pakistan) Sohail Abbas

9 goals

- (India) Baljit Singh Dhillon

6 goals

- (Pakistan) Atif Bashir

4 goals

- (India) Gagan Ajit Singh

3 goals

- (Pakistan) Naveed Asim
- (India) Ramesh Chauhan
- (Pakistan) Muhammd Irfan
- (Pakistan) Muhammad Khalid

2 goals

- (India) Baljit Singh Saini

1 goal

- (India) Sameer Dad
- (Pakistan) Muhammad Nadeem
- (Pakistan) Muhammad Sarwar
- (India) Kamal Horo
- (India) Dilip Tirkey
