= 1991 Sultan Azlan Shah Cup =

Field hockey tournament

Tournament details
- Host country: Malaysia
- City: Ipoh
- Dates: 28 July - 3 August
- Teams: 6 (from 3 confederations)
- Venue: Azlan Shah Stadium

Final positions
- Champions: (gold) India (2nd title)
- Runner-up: (silver) Pakistan
- Third place: (bronze) Soviet Union

Tournament statistics
- Matches played: 15
- Goals scored: 67 (4.47 per match)
- Top scorer: (Pakistan) Tahir Zaman (9 goals)
- Best player: (India) Pargat Singh

The 1991 Sultan Azlan Shah Cup was the 4th edition of the Sultan Azlan Shah Cup, an invitational international field hockey tournament. It took place in Ipoh, Malaysia at the Azlan Shah Stadium from 28 July to 3 August 1991.

This was the first time the tournament was held after a period of four years with the previous three editions held after every two years. India won its second title remaining unbeaten in the round-robin format. India became the first team to regain the tournament after having won their first title in 1985.

== Participating nations ==
Six countries participated in the 1991 tournament:

- Soviet Union
- Malaysia
- Pakistan
- New Zealand
- South Korea
- India

== Results ==
=== Round-robin ===
Pos	Team	Pld	W	D	L	GF	GA	GD	Pts	Result
1	India	5	5	0	0	12	1	+11	10	Champions
2	Pakistan	5	4	0	1	28	9	+19	8	Runner-up
3	Soviet Union	5	1	2	2	9	12	-3	4	Third place
4	New Zealand	5	1	1	3	5	12	-7	3	
5	Malaysia	5	1	1	3	10	18	-8	3	
6	South Korea	5	0	2	3	3	15	-12	2	

Rules for classification: 1) points; 2) goal difference; 3) goals scored; 4) head-to-head result.

==== Fixtures ====
28 July
8:00

New Zealand	1–7	Pakistan
Daji 15'	Report	Shahbaz Sr. 5'; Bashir 25'; Irfan 42'; Zaman 55', 62', 66'; Feroz 60'

28 July
17:00

Malaysia	1–4	India
Nawawi 28'	Report	D'Souza 11', 14'; Mascarenhas 30'; Ahmed 67'

28 July
19:00

South Korea	1–1	Soviet Union
Shin-heum 51'	Report	Atanov 40'

29 July
17:00

Soviet Union	4–5	Pakistan
Seksenbayev 21', 47', 51'; Atanov 56'	Report	Feroz 3'; Bashir 28', 60', 66'; Zaman 31'

29 July
19:00

Malaysia	2–1	New Zealand
Embaraj 14'; Hadi 45'	Report	Thornton 30'

30 July
17:00

India	2–0	South Korea
Jagdev 34', 47'	Report

31 July
8:00

Soviet Union	1–1	New Zealand
	Report

31 July
17:00

Malaysia	2–2	South Korea
Hadi 3'; Embaraj 48'	Report	Seok-gyo 17', 38'

31 July
19:00

Pakistan	0–1	India
	Report	Kumar 5'

1 August
17:00

Malaysia	2–3	Soviet Union
Nawawi 12'; Zaini 60'	Report	Atanov 5', 42'; Seksenbayev 34'

2 August
8:00

New Zealand	0–2	India
	Report	Jagdev 7'; Ahmed 53'

2 August
17:00

Pakistan	8–0	South Korea
Bashir 2'; Ejaz 5'; Zaman 9', 17', 37', 67'; Shahbaz Sr. 10'; Feroz 64'	Report

3 August
8:00

India	3–0	Soviet Union
Jagdev 14'; Kumar 22'; Mascarenhas 50'	Report

3 August
15:00

New Zealand	2–0	South Korea
C. Russ 1'; G. Russ 5'	Report

3 August
17:00

Malaysia	3–8	Pakistan
Embaraj 30'; Hadi 58'; Fidelis 68'	Report	Ejaz 12'; Shahbaz Jr. 14'; Feroz 37', 50'; Zaman 40'; Bashir 48', 63'; Shahbaz Sr. 65'

== Final ranking ==
- This ranking does not reflect the actual performance of the team as the ranking issued by the International Hockey Federation. This is just a benchmark ranking in the Sultan Azlan Shah Cup only.

Position	Team
1	India
2	Pakistan
3	Soviet Union
4	New Zealand
5	Malaysia
6	South Korea
