= 1993 Men's Hockey Champions Trophy =

Field hockey tournament

Tournament details
- Host country: Malaysia
- City: Kuala Lumpur
- Dates: 3–11 July
- Teams: 6
- Venue: Tun Razak Hockey Stadium

Final positions
- Champions: Australia (6th title)
- Runner-up: Germany
- Third place: Netherlands

Tournament statistics
- Matches played: 18
- Goals scored: 75 (4.17 per match)
- Top scorer: (Netherlands) Taco van den Honert (8 goals)

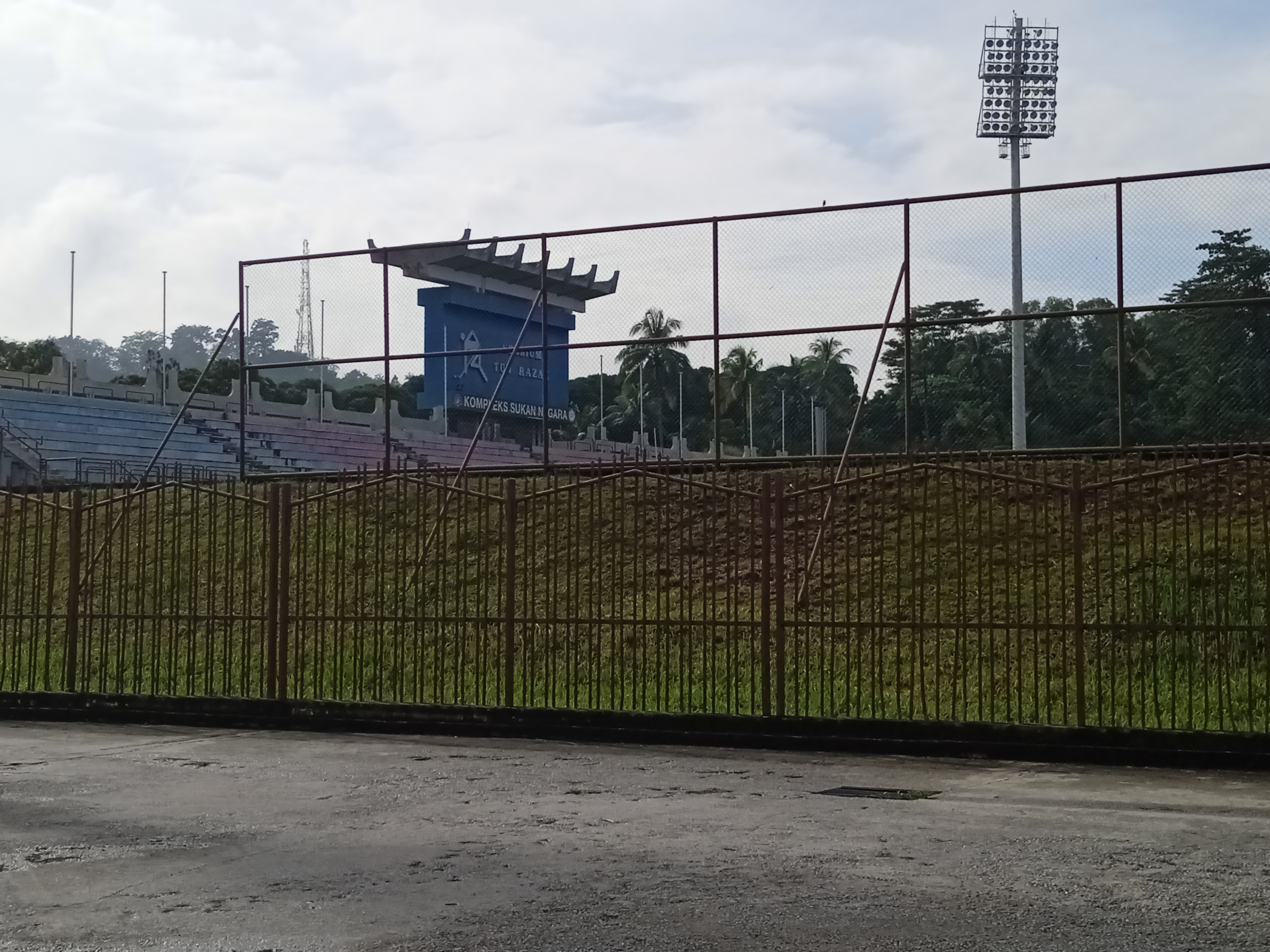
Tun Razak Hockey Stadium become the venue for field hockey tournament

The 1993 Men's Hockey Champions Trophy was the 15th edition of the Hockey Champions Trophy men's field hockey tournament. It took place from July 3–11, 1993 in the Tun Razak Hockey Stadium in Kuala Lumpur, Malaysia.

For the second time in the history the annual six nations tournament ended with play-offs, in which the numbers one and two from the round robin faced each other in the final. The numbers three and four played the bronze medal game, while the numbers five and six tried to avoid relegation in their fifth and sixth place match.

== Results ==
All times are Malaysia Time (UTC+08:00)

=== Pool ===
Team	Pld	W	D	L	GF	GA	GD	Pts
Germany	5	5	0	0	15	6	+9	10
Australia	5	3	0	2	12	8	+4	6
Netherlands	5	3	0	2	8	7	+1	6
Pakistan	5	2	1	2	10	8	+2	5
Malaysia	5	1	1	3	8	13	−5	3
Spain	5	0	0	5	2	13	−11	0

3 July 1993
16:00

Netherlands	2–1	Malaysia
Drenth 23'; Brinkman 33'	Report	Lim Chiow Chuan 62'

Umpires:
Steve Horgan (USA)
Don Prior (AUS)

3 July 1993
18:00

Germany	2–0	Spain
Michel 10'; Mayerhöfer 54'	Report

Umpires:
Rob Lathouwers (NED)
Sathasivan Yasudhasan (MAS)

3 July 1993
20:00

Australia	2–1	Pakistan
Hager 4'; Wansbrough 60'	Report	Zaman 55'

Umpires:
Santiago Deo (ESP)
Richard Wolter (GER)

4 July 1993
17:00

Spain	1–2	Malaysia
Usoz 39'	Report	Lim Chiow Chuan 25'; Zaini 43'

Umpires:
Shafat Baghdadi (PAK)
Kiyoshi Sana (JPN)

4 July 1993
19:00

Germany	3–2	Pakistan
Moissl 7'; Mayerhöfer 15'; Blunck 29'	Report	Masadduq 6'; Bashir 57'

Umpires:
Don Prior (AUS)
Sasidharan Vasutheven (MAS)

5 July 1993
17:30

Netherlands	1–0	Australia
Brinkman 48'	Report

Umpires:
Santiago Deo (ESP)
Sathasivan Yasidhasan (MAS)

6 July 1993
16:00

Spain	1–5	Australia
Iglesias 52'	Report	Wansbrough 5'; Hager 23', 44'; Carey 35'; Stacy 55'

Umpires:
Shafat Baghdadi (PAK)
Sasidharan Vasutheven (MAS)

6 July 1993
18:00

Germany	4–1	Malaysia
Michel 11', 16'; Dorflinger 52'; Waldhauser 54'	Report	Nawawi 60'

Umpires:
Steve Horgan (USA)
Rob Lathouwers (NED)

6 July 1993
20:00

Netherlands	1–3	Pakistan
Brinkman 57'	Report	Bashir 33'; Ashraf 35', 50'

Umpires:
Kiyoshi Sana (JPN)
Richard Wolter (GER)

7 July 1993
18:00

Malaysia	2–2	Pakistan
Nawawi 41', 53'	Report	Bashir 25', 48'

Umpires:
Santiago Deo (ESP)
Rob Lathouwers (NED)

8 July 1993
17:00

Netherlands	2–0	Spain
Van den Honert 39', 59'	Report

Umpires:
Don Prior (AUS)
Sasidharan Vasutheven (MAS)

8 July 1993
19:00

Australia	1–3	Germany
Hager 51'	Report	Schiefer 24'; Dorflinger 34'; Saliger 54'

Umpires:
Shafat Baghdadi (PAK)
Kiyoshi Sana (JPN)

9 July 1993
16:00

Pakistan	2–0	Spain
Ashraf 26'; Bashir 48'	Report

Umpires:
Rob Lathouwers (NED)
Sathasivan Yasudhasan (MAS)

9 July 1993
18:00

Malaysia	2–4	Australia
Zaini 18', 69'	Report	Hager 20', 27'; Davies 21', 49'

Umpires:
Steve Horgan (USA)
Richard Wolter (GER)

9 July 1993
20:00

Netherlands	2–3	Germany
Van den Honert 6'; Veen 30'	Report	Blunck 19', 53'; Michel 35'

Umpires:
Santiago Deo (ESP)
Don Prior (AUS)

=== Classification ===
==== Fifth and sixth place ====
11 July 1993
08:00

Spain	5–3	Malaysia
Arnau 20', 24'; Iglesias 44'; Dinares 55', 68'	Report	Zaini 12', 17'; Ariffin 70'

Umpires:
Steve Horgan (USA)
Kiyoshi Sana (JPN)

==== Third and fourth place ====
11 July 1993
14:00

Netherlands	6–2	Pakistan
Van den Honert 11', 46', 59', 64', 68'; Brinkman 15'	Report	Bashir 14'; Ashraf 19'

Umpires:
Richard Wolter (GER)
Sathasivan Yasudhasan (MAS)

==== Final ====
11 July 1993
16:15

Australia	4–0	Germany
Wansbrough 20'; Hager 45'; Bodimeade 47', 55'	Report

Umpires:
Santiago Deo (ESP)
Rob Lathouwers (NED)

== Final standings ==
1. Australia
2. Germany
3. Netherlands
4. Pakistan
5. Spain
6. Malaysia
