= La Bouille =

- Commune
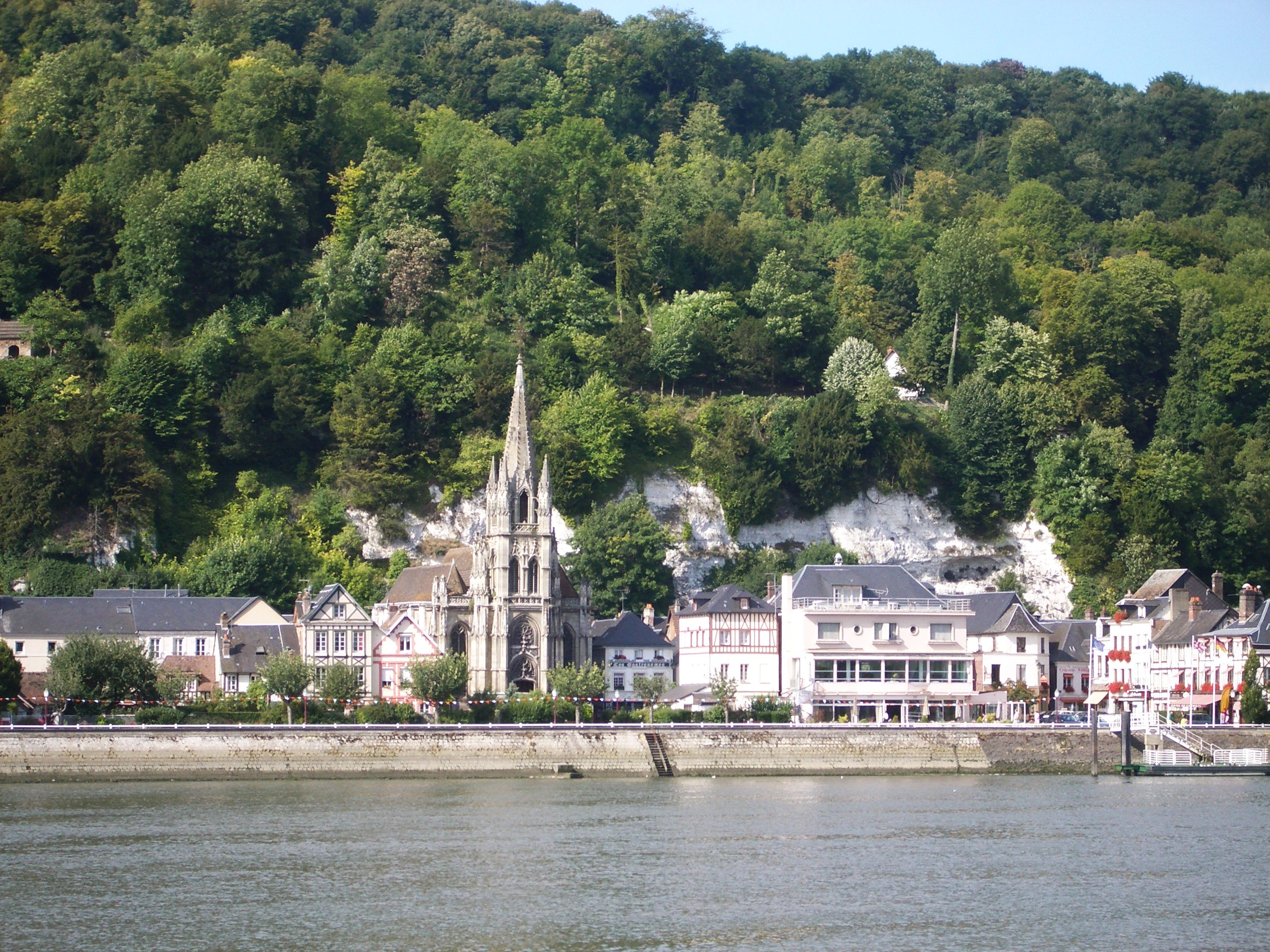
- A general view of La Bouille

- Coat of arms
- Location of La Bouille
- Location within France Location within Normandy
- Coordinates: 49°21′04″N 0°55′55″E
- Country: France
- Region: Normandy
- Department: Seine-Maritime
- Arrondissement: Rouen
- Canton: Elbeuf
- Intercommunality: Métropole Rouen Normandie

Government
  - Mayor (2020–2026): Jacques Meng
- Area^{1}: 1.27 km^{2} (0.49 sq mi)
- Elevation: 5 m (16 ft)
- Highest elevation: 133 m (436 ft)
- Lowest elevation: 2 m (6.6 ft)
- Population (2023): 706
  - Density: 556/km^{2} (1,440/sq mi)
- Time zone: UTC+01:00 (CET)
  - Summer (DST): UTC+02:00 (CEST)
- INSEE/Postal code: 76131 /76530
- ^{1} French Land Register data, which excludes lakes, ponds, glaciers > 1 km^{2} (0.386 sq mi or 247 acres) and river estuaries.

La Bouille (French pronunciation: [la buj]) is a commune in the Seine-Maritime department in the Normandy region in north-western France.

== Geography ==
A small village (in area) surrounded by woodland situated south of a meander of the river Seine, some 11 miles (18 km) southwest of Rouen, at the junction of the D 64, D 132 and the D 675 roads. A ferry service crosses the river to Sahurs.

== Population ==
Historical population

Year	Pop.	±% p.a.
1793	959	—
1800	802	−2.52%
1806	877	+1.50%
1821	1,182	+2.01%
1831	1,171	−0.09%
1836	796	−7.43%
1841	772	−0.61%
1846	741	−0.82%
1851	745	+0.11%
1856	667	−2.19%
1861	652	−0.45%
1866	625	−0.84%
1872	602	−0.62%
1876	556	−1.97%
1881	562	+0.21%
1886	565	+0.11%
1891	544	−0.75%
1896	536	−0.30%
1901	515	−0.80%

Year	Pop.	±% p.a.
1906	519	+0.15%
1911	502	−0.66%
1921	435	−1.42%
1926	466	+1.39%
1931	444	−0.96%
1936	497	+2.28%
1946	611	+2.09%
1954	618	+0.14%
1962	661	+0.84%
1968	611	−1.30%
1975	661	+1.13%
1982	550	−2.59%
1990	862	+5.78%
1999	791	−0.95%
2007	805	+0.22%
2012	793	−0.30%
2017	753	−1.03%
2023	706	−1.07%

Source: EHESS and INSEE (1968-2023)

== Notable people ==
- Writer Hector Malot was born here in 1830.
- French actor Albert Lambert.
- La Bouille has been the subject of landscapes by Turner, Gauguin, Albert Lebourg, Robert Antoine Pinchon and Henri Vignet.

== Places of interest ==
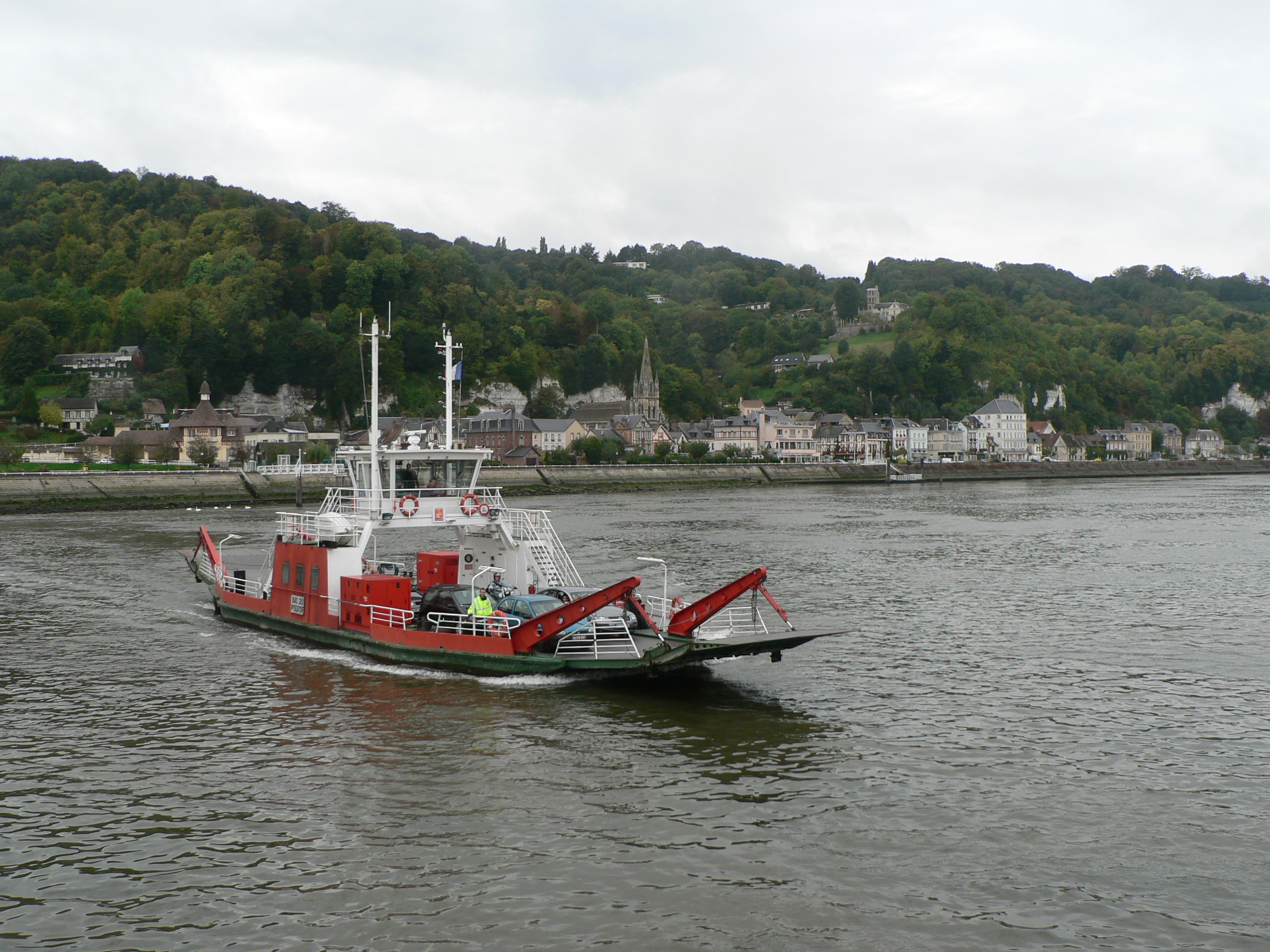
La Bouille and the ferry

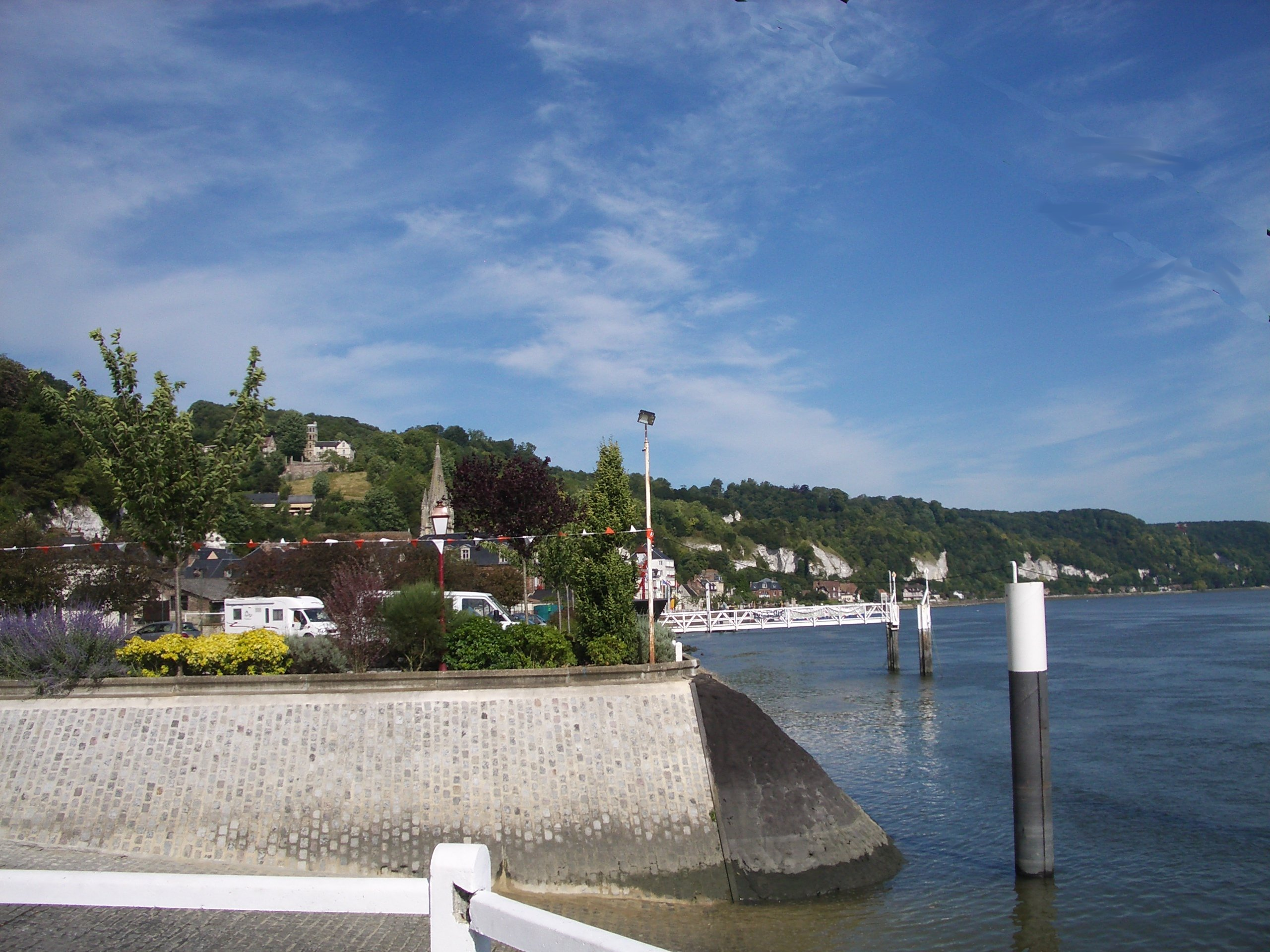
The ferry dock at La Bouille

- The church of Sainte-Madeleine, dating from the sixteenth century.
- A sixteenth century salt warehouse.
- Several lesser buildings dating from the thirteenth century.
- The Château Albert Lambert.
- The seventeenth-century château de l'Ermitage

== See also ==
- Communes of the Seine-Maritime department
