= Orival, Seine-Maritime =

Orival
- Commune
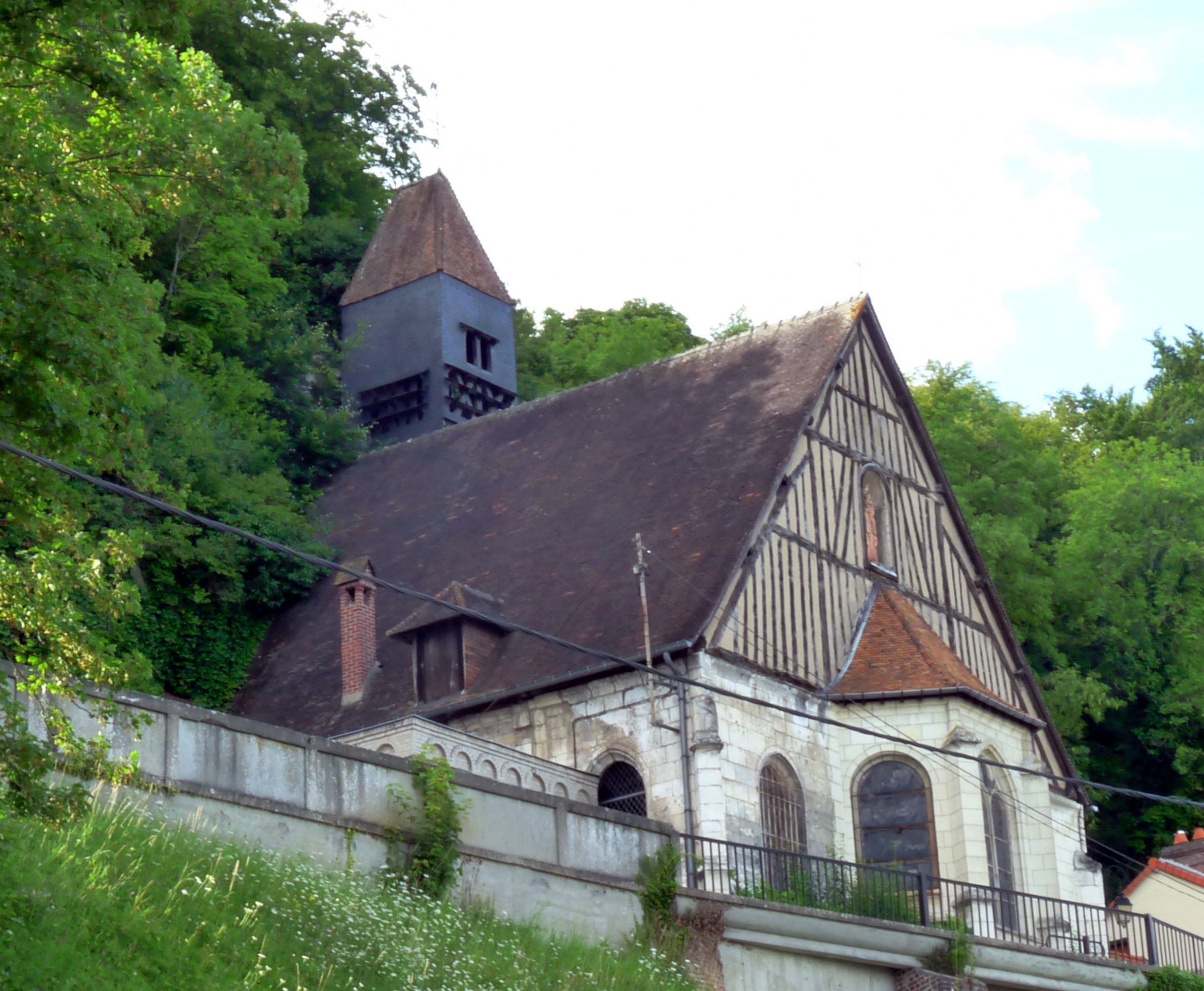
- The church in Orival

- Coat of arms
- Location of Orival
- Location within France Location within Normandy
- Coordinates: 49°18′46″N 0°59′51″E
- Country: France
- Region: Normandy
- Department: Seine-Maritime
- Arrondissement: Rouen
- Canton: Elbeuf
- Intercommunality: Métropole Rouen Normandie

Government
  - Mayor (2020–2026): Daniel Duchesne
- Area^{1}: 9.55 km^{2} (3.69 sq mi)
- Elevation: 17 m (56 ft)
- Highest elevation: 131 m (430 ft)
- Lowest elevation: 2 m (6.6 ft)
- Population (2023): 818
  - Density: 85.7/km^{2} (222/sq mi)
- Time zone: UTC+01:00 (CET)
  - Summer (DST): UTC+02:00 (CEST)
- INSEE/Postal code: 76486 /76500
- ^{1} French Land Register data, which excludes lakes, ponds, glaciers > 1 km^{2} (0.386 sq mi or 247 acres) and river estuaries.

Orival (French pronunciation: [ɔʁival]) is a commune in the Seine-Maritime departement in the Normandy region in northern France.

== Geography ==
A village surrounded by woodland and situated by the banks and cliffs of the river Seine, just 12 miles (19 km) south of Rouen at the junction of the D938, D64 and the D132 roads.

== History ==
The history of the town goes back to Neolithic times, as proved by the finds of Stone-Age tools and mammoth bones in the numerous large caves and the cliffs of the area.
The Romans also left traces of their passing, with the remains of a fanum visible on one of the hills.
King Richard I of England (the Lion Heart) was very active in the region, erecting a castle here in 1195. His brother John of England (known as John Lackland), could not hold on to the territory and the building was already a ruin by 1203.

=== Heraldry ===
Arms of Orival	The arms of Orival are blazoned : Azure, a base azure, on which a mount from which issuant a tower argent and 2 trees proper, and on a chief gules a leopard Or.

== Population ==
Historical population
Year	Pop.	±% p.a.
1968	1,164	—
1975	1,132	−0.40%
1982	926	−2.83%
1990	1,004	+1.02%
1999	1,071	+0.72%
2007	955	−1.42%
2012	954	−0.02%
2017	913	−0.87%
2023	818	−1.81%
Source: INSEE

== Places of interest ==
- The church of St. Georges, dating from the fifteenth century.
- The ruins of the thirteenth century castle of Roche-Fouet.

== See also ==
- Communes of the Seine-Maritime department
