= Ashley Carey =

Australian field hockey player

Olympic medal record

Men's Field hockey

Representing Australia
Silver medal – second place	1992 Barcelona	Team competition

Ashley Carey (born 23 May 1969) is a former field hockey player from Australia, who was a member of the team that won the silver medal at the 1992 Summer Olympics in Barcelona, Spain. Aside from representing Australia at the 1992 Barcelona Olympics, Carey also played in two World Cups (winning bronze in Lahore in 1990 and bronze in Sydney in 1994), five Champions Trophies (winning gold in Berlin in 1989, gold in Melbourne in 1990, silver in Karachi in 1992 and gold in Kuala Lumpur in 1993) and two Junior World Cups, playing a total of 106 matches for the Kookaburras.

In February 2010, he joined the Hockey Victoria Board of Directors.
