= 1994 Sultan Azlan Shah Cup =

Field hockey tournament

Tournament details
- Host country: Malaysia
- City: Ipoh
- Teams: 5
- Venue: Azlan Shah Stadium

Final positions
- Champions: England (1st title)
- Runner-up: Pakistan
- Third place: Australia

The 1994 Sultan Azlan Shah Cup was the fifth edition of field hockey tournament the Sultan Azlan Shah Cup.

== Participating nations ==
Five countries participated in the 1994 tournament:

- England
- Malaysia
- Pakistan
- Australia
- South Korea

== Final ranking ==
- This ranking does not reflect the actual performance of the team as the ranking issued by the International Hockey Federation. This is just a benchmark ranking in the Sultan Azlan Shah Cup only.

Position	Team
1	England
2	Pakistan
3	Australia
4	Malaysia
5	South Korea
