= Canton of Elbeuf =

Coordinates: 49°18′09″N 0°59′28″E

Elbeuf
- Canton
- Country: France
- Region: Normandy
- Department: Seine-Maritime
- No. of communes: {{{nbcomm}}}
- Area: 78.52 km^{2} (30.32 sq mi)
- Population (2023): 30,092
  - Density: 383.2/km^{2} (992.6/sq mi)
- INSEE code: 76 09

The Canton of Elbeuf is a canton situated in the Seine-Maritime département and in the Normandy region of northern France.

== Geography ==
An area of farmland, forestry and light industry situated on the left bank of the Seine, 12 miles (19 km) south of Rouen in the arrondissement of Rouen, centred on the town of Elbeuf.

== Composition ==
At the French canton reorganisation which came into effect in March 2015, the canton was expanded from 4 to 6 communes:

- La Bouille
- Elbeuf
- Grand-Couronne
- La Londe
- Moulineaux
- Orival

== Population ==
Historical population
| Year | Pop. | ±% p.a. |
|---|---|---|
| 2013 | 32,250 | — |
| 2018 | 30,844 | −0.89% |
Source: INSEE

== See also ==
- Arrondissements of the Seine-Maritime department
- Cantons of the Seine-Maritime department
- Communes of the Seine-Maritime department
