= Asif Bajwa =

Pakistani field hockey player

Medal record

Men's field hockey

Representing Pakistan

Olympic Games
Bronze medal – third place	1992 Barcelona	Team

Hockey World Cup
Gold medal – first place	1994 Sydney	

Asian Games
Bronze medal – third place	1994 Hiroshima	

Asia Cup
Bronze medal – third place	1994 Hiroshima	

Champions Trophy
Gold medal – first place	1994 Lahore	
Bronze medal – third place	1995 Berlin	

Asif Muhammad Bajwa (Urdu: عاصف محمد باجوہ) (born 8 March 1969) is a former field hockey player who played for Pakistan from 1992 to 1996. He later became the team's manager and chief coach. As of 2022, he is the secretary general of Pakistan Hockey Federation.

== Career ==
Asif started his career against Spain in 1991. Bajwa was a member of Pakistan's World Cup-winning hockey team in 1994, and played 74 international matches and scored 25 goals in his career. Bajwa assisted Kamran Ashraf in scoring the only goal of 1994 Hockey World Cup Final with an accurate cross from the right. He was a part of the bronze-winning Pakistan team at the 1992 Summer Olympics in Barcelona.

In 1995, Asif Bajwa received a Pride of Performance Award from the Government of Pakistan. In 2008, he became the secretary general of the Pakistan Hockey Federation, a role he has served in intermittently since then.

On May 7, 2017 Asif Bajwa officially joined Pakistan Tehreek-e-Insaf to contest in 2018 general election for the National Assembly from the constituency NA-114 Sialkot.
