= Rana Mujahid Ali =

Pakistani field hockey player (born 1970)

Medal record

Representing Pakistan

Men's Field hockey

Olympic Games
Bronze medal – third place	1992 Barcelona	Team

Rana Mujahid Ali (born 6 September 1970) is a Pakistani former field hockey player who played as a defender. Upon retiring as a player, he has also served as an administrator of the sport with Pakistan Hockey Federation as well as the manager and head coach of the under-21 national team.

As a player, he was a member of the national team that won gold medals at the 1990 Asian Games, the 1994 World Cup, and a bronze medal at the 1992 Summer Olympics in Barcelona. He made his debut for Pakistan 06 June 1989 and played his last match in national colours on 01 October 1995, appearing in a total of 265 matches for the national team.
