= Muhammad Shahbaz =

Pakistani field hockey player

Olympic medal record

Men's field hockey

Representing Pakistan

Olympic Games
Bronze medal – third place	1992 Barcelona	Team

Asian Games
Bronze medal – third place	1994 Hiroshima	Team

Champions Trophy
Gold medal – first place	1994 Sydney	Team
Gold medal – first place	1994 Lahore	Team
Silver medal – second place	1991 Berlin	Team
Bronze medal – third place	1992 Karachi	Team
Bronze medal – third place	1995 Berlin	Team

Muhammad Shahbaz (born January 12, 1972), known as Shahbaz Junior, is a hockey player from Pakistan who took part in the 1992 and 1996 Olympics.
