= Igor Atanov =

Soviet field hockey player (born 1964)

Personal information
- Nationality: Soviet
- Born: 28 September 1964 (age 61) Almaty, Kazakhstan

Sport
- Sport: Field hockey

Igor Atanov (born 28 September 1964) is a Soviet field hockey player. He competed in the men's tournament at the 1988 Summer Olympics.
