= Atif Bashir (field hockey) =

Pakistani field hockey player

Personal information
- Nationality: Pakistani
- Born: 1 March 1971 (age 55) Bahawalpur, Punjab, Pakistan
- Occupation: Doctor
- Spouse: Yes
- Children: 2

Sport
- Sport: Field hockey

Atif Bashir (born 1 March 1971) is a Pakistani field hockey player. He retired in 2002 after an injury. He is married and has two kids. He has 6 sisters and 3 brothers who are older than him. His father died in 1980 and his mother died in 2012. He currently resides in Lahore, Punjab, Pakistan. He competed in the men's tournament at the 2000 Summer Olympics.
