= Berikkazy Seksenbayev =

Soviet field hockey player

Personal information
- Nationality: Soviet
- Born: 25 July 1967 (age 58)

Sport
- Sport: Field hockey

Berikkazy Seksenbayev (born 25 July 1967) is a Soviet field hockey player. He competed in the men's tournament at the 1992 Summer Olympics.
