= Stefan Saliger =

German field hockey player

Olympic medal record

Men's field hockey

Representing Germany
Gold medal – first place	1992 Barcelona	Team competition

Stefan Saliger (born 23 December 1967 in Limburg an der Lahn) is a German former field hockey player who competed in the 1992 Summer Olympics and in the 1996 Summer Olympics.
