= Muhammad Usman (field hockey) =

Pakistani field hockey player

Personal information
- Nationality: Pakistani
- Born: 4 April 1971 (age 55)

Sport
- Sport: Field hockey

Muhammad Usman (born 4 April 1971) is a Pakistani field hockey player. He competed in the men's tournament at the 1996 Summer Olympics.
