= Muhammad Nadeem =

Pakistani field hockey player

Personal information
- Full name: Muhammad Nadeem Ahmed
- Nickname: ND
- Nationality: Pakistan
- Born: 5 March 1972 (age 54) Gojra, Punjab, Pakistan
- Height: 1.78 m (5 ft 10 in)
- Weight: 76 kg (168 lb)

Sport
- Sport: Field hockey
- Coached by: Aitchison College

Muhammad Nadeem Ahmed (also Muhammad Nadeem, Urdu: محمد ندیم احمد; born 5 March 1972 in Gojra, Punjab) is a retired Pakistani field hockey player. He represented Pakistan in two editions of the Olympic Games (2000 and 2004), and served as a full-fledged member of the national field hockey team and also captained the side once.

Nadeem made his official debut at the 2000 Summer Olympics in Sydney, where he and the Pakistanis missed a chance to claim a bronze medal against the Aussies in the men's field hockey tournament with an official score of 3–6.

At the 2004 Summer Olympics in Athens, Nadeem qualified for the second time as a member of the Pakistani squad in the men's field hockey after receiving a wild card invitation from the Olympic Qualifying Tournament in Madrid, Spain. Narrowly missing out a slot for the semifinals by two points, Nadeem helped the Pakistanis scored a goal of 4–2 to defeat the notorious New Zealand team in the fifth place classification match. Serving as the team captain in field hockey, Nadeem was also appointed by the Pakistan Olympic Association to carry the Pakistani flag in the opening ceremony.

Shortly after his second Olympics, Nadeem announced his official retirement from international hockey after intense pressures escalated him from the team's fifth-place finish at the concluded Games.
