= Baljit Singh Dhillon =

Indian field hockey player (born 1973)

Medal record

Representing India

Men's field hockey

Asian Games
| Silver medal – second place | 1994 Hiroshima | Team |
| Gold medal – first place | 1998 Bangkok | Team |

Asia Cup
| Gold medal – first place | 2003 Kuala Lumpur | Team |
| Bronze medal – third place | 1999 Kuala Lumpur | Team |

Champions Challenge
| Gold medal – first place | 2001 Kuala Lumpur | Team |

Baljit ("Baljeet") Singh Dhillon (born 18 June 1973) is a field hockey midfielder from India, who made his international debut for the Men's National Team in 1993 during the test series against South Africa. Nicknamed Balli, Singh Dhillon represented his native country at three consecutive Summer Olympics, starting in 1996 in Atlanta, Georgia, where India finished in eighth place.
