= Muhammad Sarwar (field hockey) =

Pakistani field hockey player

Personal information
- Born: 12 May 1975 (age 51)
- Height: 177 cm (5 ft 10 in)
- Weight: 70 kg (154 lb)

Sport
- Sport: Field hockey
Medal record
Men's field hockey
Representing Pakistan
Champions Trophy
Silver medal – second place	1996 Madras	Team
Silver medal – second place	1998 Lahore	Team
Bronze medal – third place	2002 Cologne	Team

Muhammad Sarwar (born 12 May 1975) is a Pakistani former field hockey player who was active from 1995 to 2002, and played as a striker in 180 games over the course of his international career, scoring 44 goals. Sarwar played in the Premier Hockey League and represented Pakistan in the 1996 Summer Olympics, and again in the 2000 Summer Olympics, and in several Hockey World Cup tournaments. In 2002, he was on the bronze medal-winning team in the Commonwealth Games.
