= Ramandeep Singh (field hockey, born 1971) =

Indian field hockey player

Medal record

Representing India

Men's field hockey

Asian Games
Gold medal – first place	1998 Bangkok	Team

Ramandeep Singh (born 8 August 1971 in Chandigarh) is a former field hockey midfielder from India, who made his international debut for the India men's national field hockey team in 1995. Singh represented his native country at two consecutive Summer Olympics, starting in 1996 in Atlanta, Georgia, where India finished in eighth place. Four years later in Sydney, Australia, he captained the team, that finished in seventh position.

== See also ==
- List of Indian hockey captains in Olympics
- Field hockey in India
