= Aleem Raza =

Pakistani field hockey player

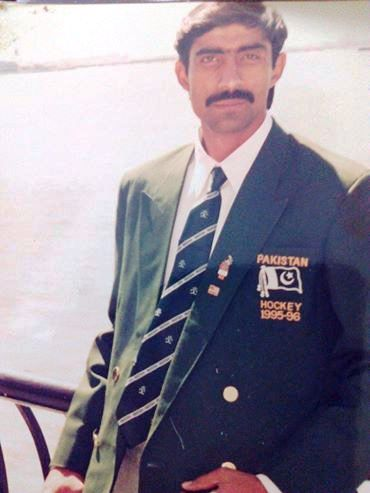
- Aleem Raza Atlanta Olympics (1996)

Personal information
- Born: 1 April 1970 (age 56) Pir Mahal

Aleem Raza (born 1 April 1970 in Pir Mahal) is a field hockey player and former member of the Pakistan National Hockey Team. He participated in the 1996 Atlanta Olympics as a part of Pakistan's national team. He played 33 matches as a striker for Pakistan and scored 8 goals in his career. In 1995 South Asian Games Pakistan won silver medal in hockey and he was the main striker of Pakistan team. He is currently a member of selection committee at Punjab Hockey Association Pakistan.
