= Carsten Fischer =

German field hockey player

Personal information
- Born: 29 August 1961 (age 65) Duisburg, West Germany
- Height: 185 cm (6 ft 1 in)
- Weight: 80 kg (176 lb)

Sport
- Sport: Field hockey
Medal record
Men's field hockey
Olympic Games
Representing West Germany
Silver medal – second place	1984 Los Angeles	Team competition
Silver medal – second place	1988 Seoul	Team competition
Representing Germany
Gold medal – first place	1992 Barcelona	Team competition

Carsten "Calle" Fischer (born 29 August 1961) is a former field hockey player from West Germany, who competed at four Summer Olympics for his native country. He won the golden medal with his team at the 1992 Summer Olympics in Barcelona, after securing silver at the two previous Olympics in Los Angeles (1984) and Seoul (1988). At his fourth Olympic games, in Atlanta (1996), he came fourth.

Fischer was nicknamed The Man with The Hammer for his ferocious penalty corners. He played 259 international matches for Germany, scored a total number of 154 goals and played club hockey at HTC Uhlenhorst Mülheim in Mülheim an der Ruhr. He was born in Duisburg. In 1990, he was diagnosed with diabetes and lost all his hair. He finished his international sports career in 1996, and his national career the next year.
