= Andreas Becker =

German field hockey player (born 1970)

Olympic medal record

Men's field hockey

Representing Germany
Gold medal – first place	1992 Barcelona	Team competition

Andreas Becker (born 8 March 1970 in Mülheim an der Ruhr) is a German former field hockey player who competed in the 1992 Summer Olympics and in the 1996 Summer Olympics.
