= Muhammad Danish Kaleem =

Pakistani hockey player

Personal information
- Nationality: Pakistani
- Born: 12 November 1973 (age 52)

Sport
- Sport: Field hockey

Muhammad Danish Kaleem (born 12 November 1973) is a Pakistani field hockey player. He competed in the men's tournament at the 1996 Summer Olympics.
