= Sven Meinhardt =

German field hockey player

Personal information
- Born: 28 September 1971 (age 54)
Medal record
Men's Field Hockey
Representing Germany
Olympic Games
Gold medal – first place	1992 Barcelona	Team competition

Sven Meinhardt (born 28 September 1971 in Mülheim an der Ruhr, Nordrhein-Westfalen) is a former field hockey forward from Germany, who won the gold medal with the Men's National Team at the 1992 Summer Olympics in Barcelona, Spain. A player from HTC Uhlenhorst in Mülheim an der Ruhr, he was also on the side that competed at the 1996 Summer Olympics in Atlanta, United States.
