= Anis Ahmed =

Pakistani field hockey player (born 1973)

Personal information
- Born: 10 December 1973 (age 52) Gojra, Punjab, Pakistan
Medal record
Men's field hockey
Representing Pakistan
Asian Games
Bronze medal – third place	1998 Bangkok	Team competition

Muhammad Anis Ahmed (born 10 December 1973, in Gojra) is a field hockey player and former member of the Pakistan National Hockey Team. He played for Pakistan's national team in the 2000 Summer Olympics and the 1998 Asian Games, where the team won bronze medals. He played 87 matches for Pakistan and scored 24 goals in his career.
