= Muhammad Qamar Ibrahim =

Pakistani field hockey player

Medal record

Representing Pakistan

Men's Field hockey

Olympic Games
Bronze medal – third place	1992 Barcelona	Team

Muhammad Qamar Ibrahim (born 14 January 1968) is a Pakistani field hockey player. He was born in Karachi. He won the gold medal at the 1990 Asian Games, beating India 3–2 in the final, and won a bronze medal at the 1992 Summer Olympics in Barcelona.
