= Gijs Weterings =

Dutch field hockey player

Personal information
- Nationality: Dutch
- Born: 24 July 1965 (age 60) Lagunillas, Venezuela

Sport
- Sport: Field hockey

Gijs Weterings (born 24 July 1965) is a Dutch field hockey player. He competed in the men's tournament at the 1992 Summer Olympics.
