= Musaddiq Hussain =

Pakistani field hockey player

Medal record

Representing Pakistan

Men's Field hockey

Olympic Games
Bronze medal – third place	1992 Barcelona	Team

Musaddiq Hussain (born April 17, 1968) is a Pakistani field hockey player. He was born in Peshawar. He was part of the Pakistani team that became the Asian Champions, winning the gold at the 1990 Asian Games and a bronze medal at the 1992 Summer Olympics in Barcelona.
