= Naveed Alam =

Pakistani field hockey player (1973–2021)

Personal information
- Nationality: Pakistani
- Born: 16 September 1973 Sheikhupura, Pakistan
- Died: 13 July 2021 (aged 47) Lahore, Pakistan
- Resting place: Nabipura Graveyard, Sheikhupura, Pakistan

Sport
- Sport: Field hockey

Naveed Alam (16 September 1973 – 13 July 2021) was a Pakistani field hockey player. He competed in the men's tournament at the 1996 Summer Olympics.

== Playing career ==
Naveed Alam mainly played as a fullback and was integral part of the Pakistan Hockey team that clinched the World Cup in Sydney in 1994. He also represented Pakistan in the 1996 Atlanta Olympics.

== Post-retirement ==
Naveed Alam served as the head coach of Pakistan's hockey team at the Beijing Olympic Games in 2008 but soon resigned after finishing 8th - their worst-ever finish in Olympic history. He was appointed as director development and domestic by Pakistan Hockey Federation (PHF) in 2016 but was sacked in 2018 by PHF due to giving statements against the federation. He also coached Bangladesh Hockey team and China Hockey team. In 2020, he was banned for 10 years for forming a parallel association of Punjab Hockey Association. He was also accused of involvement in anti-hockey activities.

== Death ==
On 7 July 2021, it was reported Alam had been diagnosed with blood cancer. He sought financial support from the government for treatment. He died on 13 July 2021, aged 47, after undergoing chemotherapy at Shaukat Khanum Hospital, Lahore.
