= David Wansbrough =

Australian field hockey player

Olympic medal record

Men's field hockey

Representing Australia
Silver medal – second place	1992 Barcelona	Team competition

David Colin Wansbrough OAM (born 29 April 1965) is a former field hockey player from Australia. He competed at both the 1988 Summer Olympics and the 1992 Summer Olympics, winning the silver medal with the Australian team in 1992. He is currently a director of the Victorian Olympic Council, Kindilan Society and a partner at Evans and Partners stockbrokers in Melbourne.
