= Muhammad Khalid =

Pakistani field hockey player

Medal record

Representing Pakistan

Men's Field hockey

Olympic Games
Bronze medal – third place	1992 Barcelona	Team

Muhammad Khalid (born 18 March 1973) is a Pakistani field hockey player. He won a bronze medal at the 1992 Summer Olympics in Barcelona.
