= Wasim Feroz =

Pakistani field hockey player

Medal record

Representing Pakistan

Men's Field hockey

Olympic Games
| Bronze medal – third place | 1992 Barcelona | Team |

Wasim Feroz (born 10 October 1966) is a Pakistani field hockey player. He won a silver medal at the 1990 Hockey World Cup at Lahore and a bronze medal at the 1992 Summer Olympics in Barcelona.

At the end of 1994, the 1994 World Cup was held in Sydney. Pakistan finished first in their preliminary group, ahead of the Australians, and reached the final by beating Germany 5–3 on penalties. There they defeated the Dutch team 4–3 again in a penalty shootout.
