= Christian Blunck =

German field hockey player

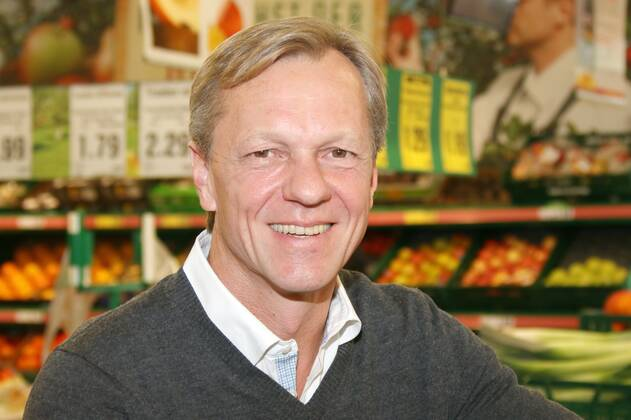

Personal information
- Born: 28 June 1968 (age 57) Hamburg, West Germany
Medal record
Men's field hockey
Representing Germany
Olympic Games
Gold medal – first place	1992 Barcelona	Team competition

Christian "Büdi" Blunck (born 28 June 1968 in Hamburg) is a former field hockey midfield player from Germany.

He represented the Men's National Team at the 1992 Summer Olympics in Barcelona, Spain, winning the gold medal and being named the Best Player of the Olympic Tournament. He was also on the side that competed at the 1996 Summer Olympics in Atlanta, United States, where they finished fourth.

Blunck's mother Greta also played for the German national team. He resigned from the national squad in 1998. He played club hockey in Germany for Harvestehuder THC.
