= Kamran Ashraf =

Pakistani hockey player and International Banker

Kamran Ashraf (Urdu: کامران اشرف; born 30 September 1973) is a former hockey player from Pakistan who played as a forward. He played for Pakistan in the 1996 Summer Olympics and 2000 Summer Olympics. He was part of the national team that won the 1994 Men's Hockey World Cup, scoring eight goals in the tournament.
