= Khalid Bashir =

Pakistani field hockey player (born 1968)

Medal record

Representing Pakistan

Men's Field hockey

Olympic Games
Bronze medal – third place	1992 Barcelona	Team

Khalid Bashir (born 14 February 1968) is a former field hockey player from Pakistan who played as a defender. He was born in Faisalabad. He played 143 international matches for his country and scored 66 goals. He was a member of Pakistan's hockey team at the 1988 and 1992 Summer Olympics, winning a bronze medal at the latter event.
