= Tahir Zaman =

Pakistani field hockey player (born 1969)

Personal information
- Born: 6 March 1969 (age 57) Gojra, Pakistan
Medal record
Men's field hockey
Representing Pakistan
World Cup
Gold medal – first place	1994 Sydney
Olympic Games
Bronze medal – third place	1992 Barcelona	Team competition

Tahir Zaman (born 6 March 1969) is a former hockey player from Pakistan who had played in the 1992 Olympics at Barcelona, Spain. He was part of the gold-medal winning Pakistan team at both the 1990 Asian Games, and the 1994 Hockey World Cup. Zaman, who was the team captain at the 1992 Olympics, later served as coach for the team and took part in the 2002 Commonwealth Games.

Zaman also took part in the Olympic Solidarity Hockey Coaching Course as part of the International Hockey Federation's efforts to promote hockey in Asia. Tahir also played a key role in 1994 World Cup victory for Pakistan in Sydney, Australia. Tahir Zaman played in a forward position as a striker and was capped 252 times with 134 goals to his credit.

== Awards ==
- Pride of Performance Award by the President of Pakistan in 1994.
