= Field hockey at the 1992 Summer Olympics – Men's team squads =

List of hockey players

The following is the list of squads that took place in the men's field hockey tournament at the 1992 Summer Olympics.

== Argentina ==
The following players represented Argentina:

- Emanuel Roggero
- Marcelo Garrafo
- Adrián Mandarano
- Diego Allona
- Rodolfo Pérez
- Edgardo Pailos
- Fernando Falchetto
- Alejandro Siri
- Carlos Geneyro
- Gabriel Minadeo
- Fernando Ferrara
- Pablo Moreira
- Aldo Ayala
- Martín Sordelli
- Daniel Ruiz
- Pablo Lombi

== Australia ==
The following players represented Australia:

- Warren Birmingham
- David Wansbrough
- John Bestall
- Lee Bodimeade
- Ashley Carey
- Stephen Davies
- Damon Diletti
- Lachlan Dreher
- Lachlan Elmer
- Dean Evans
- Greg Corbitt
- Paul Lewis
- Graham Reid
- Jay Stacy
- Ken Wark
- Michael York

== Egypt ==
The following players represented Egypt:

- Mohamed El-Sayed Tantawy
- Ibrahim Mahmoud Tawfik
- Hussain Mohamed Hassan
- Hisham Moustafa Korany
- Gamal Fawzi Mohamed
- Abdel Khlik Abou El-Yazi
- Magdy Ahmed Abdullah
- Gamal Ahmed Abdulla
- Ashraf Shafik Gindy
- Gamal Amin Abdel Ghani
- Amro El-Sayed Osman
- Ehab Moustafa Mansour
- Mohamed Sayed Abdulla
- Amro El-Sayed Mohamady
- Mohamed Samir Mohamed
- Wael Fahim Mostafa

== Germany ==
The following players represented Germany:

- Michael Knauth
- Christopher Reitz
- Jan-Peter Tewes
- Carsten Fischer
- Christian Blunck
- Stefan Saliger
- Michael Metz
- Christian Mayerhöfer
- Sven Meinhardt
- Andreas Keller
- Michael Hilgers
- Andreas Becker
- Stefan Tewes
- Klaus Michler
- Volker Fried
- Oliver Kurtz

== Great Britain ==
The following players represented Great Britain:

- Sean Rowlands
- Sam Martin
- Paul Bolland
- Simon Nicklin
- Jon Potter
- Jason Laslett
- Robert Hill
- Steve Batchelor
- Russell Garcia
- John Shaw
- Nicky Thompson
- Sean Kerly
- Robert Clift
- Jason Lee
- Donald Williams

== India ==
The following players represented India:

- Cheppudira Poonacha
- Jagdev Singh Rai
- Harpreet Singh
- Sukhjit Singh
- Shakeel Ahmed
- Mukesh Kumar Nandanoori
- Jude Sebastian
- Jagbir Singh
- Dhanraj Pillay
- Didar Singh
- Ashish Kumar Ballal
- Pargat Singh
- Ravi Nayakar
- Darryl D'Souza
- Ajit Lakra

== Malaysia ==
The following players represented Malaysia:

- Ahmed Fadzil
- Paul Lopez
- Tai Beng Hai
- Suppiah Suria Ghandi
- Lim Chiow Chuan
- Sarjit Singh Kyndan
- Gary Fidelis
- Brian Jaya Siva
- Shankar Ramu
- Nor Saiful Zaini Nasir-ud-Din
- Dharma Raj Kanniah
- Mohamed Abdul Hadi
- Mirnawan Nawawi
- Lailin Abu Hassan
- Soon Mustafa bin Karim
- Aanantha Sambu Mayavo

== Netherlands ==
The following players represented the Netherlands:

- Frank Leistra
- Harrie Kwinten
- Cees Jan Diepeveen
- Pieter van Ede
- Bastiaan Poortenaar
- Wouter van Pelt
- Marc Delissen
- Jacques Brinkman
- Gijs Weterings
- Stephan Veen
- Floris Jan Bovelander
- Hendrik Jan Kooijman
- Bart Looije
- Maarten van Grimbergen
- Leo Klein Gebbink
- Taco van den Honert

== New Zealand ==
The following players represented New Zealand:

- Peter Daji
- Brett Leaver
- David Grundy
- Scott Hobson
- Grant McLeod
- Peter Miskimmin
- Paresh Patel
- David Penfold
- John Radovonich
- Craig Russ
- Greg Russ
- Umesh Parag
- Jamie Smith
- Anthony Thornton
- Scott Anderson
- Ian Woodley

== Pakistan ==
The following players represented Pakistan:

- Shahid Ali Khan
- Mujahid Ali Rana
- Khalid Bashir
- Anjum Saeed
- Farhat Hassan Khan
- Khawaja Junaid
- Muhammad Qamar Ibrahim
- Tahir Zaman
- Akhlaq Ahmed
- Shahbaz Ahmed
- Wasim Feroz
- Mansoor Ahmed
- Muhammad Khalid
- Asif Bajwa
- Musaddiq Hussain
- Muhammad Shahbaz

== Spain ==
The following players represented Spain:

- Santiago Grau
- Ignacio Escudé
- Kim Malgosa
- Miguel Ortego
- Juantxo García-Mauriño
- Jaume Amat
- Jorge Avilés
- Pedro Jufresa
- José Antonio Iglesias
- Xavier Escudé
- Javier Arnau
- Víctor Pujol
- Juan Antonio Dinarés
- David Freixa
- Pablo Usoz
- Ramón Jufresa

== Unified Team ==
The following players represented the Unified Team:

- Vladimir Pleshakov
- Viktor Deputatov
- Igor Yulchiyev
- Sos Hayrapetyan
- Yury Safonov
- Vladimir Antakov
- Yevgeny Nechayev
- Aleksandr Krasnoyartsev
- Viktor Sukhikh
- Sergey Pleshakov
- Berikkazy Seksenbayev
- Aleksandr Domashev
- Sergey Barabashin
- Oleg Khandayev
- Igor Muladyanov
