= Egypt at the 1992 Summer Olympics =

- IOC code: EGY
- NOC: Egyptian Olympic Committee

in Barcelona
- Competitors: 75 (72 men and 3 women) in 13 sports
- Flag bearer: Mohamed Khorshed
- Medals: Gold 0 Silver 0 Bronze 0 Total 0

Summer Olympics appearances (overview)
- 1912; 1920; 1924; 1928; 1932; 1936; 1948; 1952; 1956; 1960–1964; 1968; 1972; 1976; 1980; 1984; 1988; 1992; 1996; 2000; 2004; 2008; 2012; 2016; 2020; 2024

Other related appearances
- 1906 Intercalated Games –––– United Arab Republic (1960, 1964)

Egypt competed at the 1992 Summer Olympics in Barcelona, Spain. 75 competitors, 72 men and 3 women, took part in 32 events in 13 sports.

== Competitors ==
The following is the list of number of Egyptian competitors at the Games.

Sport	Men	Women	Total
Boxing	3	–	3
Equestrian	1	0	1
Fencing	1	0	1
Field hockey	16	0	16
Football	17	–	17
Handball	14	0	14
Judo	2	1	3
Modern pentathlon	3	–	3
Shooting	5	0	5
Swimming	1	1	2
Table tennis	1	1	2
Weightlifting	5	–	5
Wrestling	3	–	3
Total	72	3	75

== Boxing ==
Athlete	Event	Round of 32	Round of 16	Quarterfinals	Semifinals	Final	
Athlete	Event	Opposition Result	Opposition Result	Opposition Result	Opposition Result	Opposition Result	Rank
Moustafa Esmail	Flyweight	Choe (PRK); L 4–7	Did not advance				
Emil Rizk	Lightweight	Chavez (PHI); L 10–18	Did not advance				
Kabary Salem	Light middleweight	Maleckis (LTU); L 6–13	Did not advance				

== Equestrianism ==
=== Jumping ===
Athlete	Horse	Event	Qualification								Final					
Athlete	Horse	Event	Round 1		Round 2		Round 3		Total		Round 1		Round 2		Total	
Athlete	Horse	Event	Score	Rank	Score	Rank	Score	Rank	Score	Rank	Penalties	Rank	Penalties	Rank	Penalties	Rank
André Salah Sakakini	Get Away	Individual	27.00	61	12.00	76	54.00	34	93.00	60	Did not advance					

== Fencing ==
One male fencer represented Egypt in 1992.

Individual
Pool stage

Athlete	Event	Group Stage						
Athlete	Event	Opposition Result	Opposition Result	Opposition Result	Opposition Result	Opposition Result	Opposition Result	Rank
Maged Abdallah	Men's foil	Wendt (AUT); L 2–5	Numa (ITA); L 3–5	Guerra (ESP); W 5–3	Tang (HKG); W 5–2	Krzesiński (POL); L 2–5	—N/a	36 Q

Elimination phase

Athlete	Event	Round 1	Round 2	Round 3	Round 4	Repechage				Quarterfinals	Semifinals	Final	
Athlete	Event	Round 1	Round 2	Round 3	Round 4	Round 1	Round 2	Round 3	Round 4	Quarterfinals	Semifinals	Final	
Athlete	Event	Opposition Result	Opposition Result	Opposition Result	Opposition Result	Opposition Result	Opposition Result	Opposition Result	Opposition Result	Opposition Result	Opposition Result	Opposition Result	Rank
Maged Abdallah	Men's foil	Wang (CHN); L 0–2	Did not advance										

== Football ==
Summary

Key:

- A.E.T – After extra time.
- P – Match decided by penalty-shootout.

Team	Event	Group stage				Quarterfinal	Semi-final	Final / BM	
Team	Event	Opposition Score	Opposition Score	Opposition Score	Rank	Opposition Score	Opposition Score	Opposition Score	Rank
Egypt men's	Men's tournament	Qatar; L 0–1	Spain; L 0–2	Colombia; W 4–3	3	Did not advance			

Team roster

Head coach: Mahmoud Saad El-Din Ahmed

No.	Pos.	Player	DoB	Age	Caps	Club	Tournament games	Tournament goals	Minutes played	Sub off	Sub on	Cards yellow/red
1	GK	Nader El-Sayed	31 December 1972			(Egypt) Zamalek SC
2	DF	Amr El-Hadidy	24 December 1969			(Egypt) Ghazl El Mahalla SC
3	DF	Tamer Abdul Hamid	16 October 1971			(Egypt) Zamalek SC
4	DF	Khaled El-Ghandour	27 July 1970			(Egypt) Zamalek SC
5	DF	Haytham Farouk	4 January 1971			(Egypt) Olympic SC
6	DF	Sami El-Sheshini	23 January 1972			(Egypt) Zamalek SC
7	DF	Yehia Nabil Khaled	4 September 1971			(Egypt) Zamalek SC
8	MF	Hady Khashaba	19 December 1972			(Egypt) Al Ahly SC
9	FW	Moustafa Ibrahim	1 August 1970			(Egypt) Zamalek SC
10	FW	Mohamed Salah Abo Greisha	1 January 1970			(Egypt) Ismaily SC
11	FW	Yasser Rayyan	26 March 1970			(Egypt) El Mansoura SC
12	GK	Essam Abdelazim	1 November 1970			(Egypt) Tersana SC
13	MF	Mohamed Youssef	9 October 1970			(Egypt) Al Ahly SC
14	FW	Moustafa Sadek	31 January 1972			(Egypt) Al Mokawloon Al Arab SC
15	MF	Akel Gadallah	15 November 1972			(Egypt) Zamalek SC
16	DF	Tawfik Sakr	8 November 1969			(Egypt) Ghazl El Mahalla SC
17	DF	Ahmed Nakhla	5 February 1971			(Egypt) Al Mokawloon Al Arab SC
18	FW	Mohamed Abdelaty	14 January 1971			(Egypt) Olympic El Qanah FC
19	GK	Mohamed Sallam	5 December 1969			(Egypt) Olympic SC
20	FW	Ibrahim El-Masry	19 August 1971			(Egypt) Al-Masry SC

Group play

Team	Pld	W	D	L	GF	GA	GD	Pts
Spain	3	3	0	0	8	0	+8	6
Qatar	3	1	1	1	2	3	−1	3
Egypt	3	1	0	2	4	6	−2	2
Colombia	3	0	1	2	4	9	−5	1

Source: FIFA
24 July 1992
20:00

Egypt	0–1	Qatar
	Report	Mustafa 74'

Estadi de la Nova Creu Alta, Sabadell
Attendance: 2,000
Referee: Philip Don (GBR)

27 July 1992
21:00

Spain	2–0	Egypt
Solozábal 55'; Soler 70'	Report

Estadio Luis Casanova, Valencia
Attendance: 15,000
Referee: Marcio Rezende de Freitas (BRA)

29 July 1992
19:00

Colombia	3–4	Egypt
Gaviria 9', 84'; Pacheco 14'	Report	Youssef 27'; El-Masry 47'; Khashaba 90+1', 90+4'

Estadi de la Nova Creu Alta, Sabadell
Attendance: 4,500
Referee: Ali Bujsaim (UAE)

== Handball ==
Summary

Key:

- ET: After extra time
- P – Match decided by penalty-shootout.

Team	Event	Group stage						Semifinal	Final / BM	
Team	Event	Opposition Score	Opposition Score	Opposition Score	Opposition Score	Opposition Score	Rank	Opposition Score	Opposition Score	Rank
Egypt men's	Men's tournament	Romania; L 21–22	Spain; L 18–23	Unified Team; L 18–22	Germany; L 16–24	France; L 19–22	6	—N/a	Brazil; W 27–24^{ET}	11

Team roster

  - Hosam Abdallah
  - Ayman Abdel Hamid Soliman
  - Mohamed Abdel Mohamed
  - Ahmed Belal
  - Ahmed Debes
  - Ahmed Elattar
  - Ahmed Elawady
  - Aser Elkasaby
  - Khlaed Elkordy
  - Adel Elsharkawy
  - Ashraf Mabrouk
  - Yasser Mahmoud
  - Gohar Mohamed
  - Sameh Mohamed
  - Mohsen Radwan
  - Amr Serageldin
  - Mahmoud Soliman
- Head coach: Paul Tiedemann

Group play

Pos	Team	Pld	W	D	L	GF	GA	GD	Pts	Qualification
1	Unified Team	5	5	0	0	121	98	+23	10	Semifinals
2	France	5	4	0	1	111	98	+13	8	Semifinals
3	Spain (H)	5	3	0	2	97	98	−1	6	Fifth place game
4	Romania	5	1	1	3	107	115	−8	3 (Note: 25% rule: Romania –9 GD; Germany –14 GD)	Seventh place game
5	Germany	5	1	1	3	97	103	−6	3	Ninth place game
6	Egypt	5	0	0	5	92	113	−21	0	Eleventh place game

(H) Hosts
Notes:

27 July 1992; 10:00	Romania	22–21	Egypt	Palau d'Esports de Granollers, Granollers; Referees: Johansson, Kjellkvist (SWE)
27 July 1992; 10:00	Berbece 5	(10–12)	Belal 6	Palau d'Esports de Granollers, Granollers; Referees: Johansson, Kjellkvist (SWE)

29 July 1992; 19:00	Egypt	18–23	Spain	Palau d'Esports de Granollers, Granollers; Referees: Goto, Shimada (JPN)
29 July 1992; 19:00	five players 3	(11–11)	Urdiales 9	Palau d'Esports de Granollers, Granollers; Referees: Goto, Shimada (JPN)

31 July 1992; 10:00	Unified Team	22–18	Egypt	Palau d'Esports de Granollers, Granollers; Referees: Christensen, Jørgensen (DEN)
31 July 1992; 10:00	Dujshebaev 8	(12–9)	Abdallah, El-Attar 4	Palau d'Esports de Granollers, Granollers; Referees: Christensen, Jørgensen (DEN)

2 August 1992; 14:30	Egypt	16–24	Germany	Palau d'Esports de Granollers, Granollers; Referees: Convents, Xhonneux (BEL)
2 August 1992; 14:30	El-Attar 6	(5–13)	Roos 7	Palau d'Esports de Granollers, Granollers; Referees: Convents, Xhonneux (BEL)

4 August 1992; 10:00	France	22–19	Egypt	Palau d'Esports de Granollers, Granollers; Referees: Jug, Jeglič (SLO)
4 August 1992; 10:00	Munier 8	(10–7)	Debes, Mohamed 4	Palau d'Esports de Granollers, Granollers; Referees: Jug, Jeglič (SLO)

11th place game

7 August 1992
14:00
Egypt
27–24 (ET)
Brazil
Palau d'Esports de Granollers, Granollers
Referees: Amigo, González (ESP)
Mahmoud 8
(10–8)
Carnasciali, Nascimento 5

FT: 19–19 ET: 3–3, 2–2 Pen: 3–0

== Hockey ==
Summary

Key:

- FT – After full time.
- P – Match decided by penalty-shootout.

Team	Event	Group stage						Semifinal	Final / BM	
Team	Event	Opposition Score	Opposition Score	Opposition Score	Opposition Score	Opposition Score	Rank	Opposition Score	Opposition Score	Rank
Egypt men's	Men's tournament	Great Britain; L 0–2	Australia; L 1–5	Argentina; L 0–1	Germany; L 2–8	India; L 1–2	6	Unified Team; L 2–4	Argentina; L 3–7	12

Team roster

  - (01.) Mohamed Tantawy (captain and gk)
  - (02.) Ibrahim Tawfik
  - (03.) Husan Hassan
  - (04.) Hisham Korany
  - (05.) Gamal Mohamed
  - (06.) Abdel Khlik Abou El-Yazi
  - (07.) Magdy Ahmed Abdullah
  - (08.) Gamal Ahmed Abdulla
  - (09.) Ashraf Gindy
  - (10.) Gamal Abdelgany
  - (11.) Amro Osman
  - (12.) Ehab Mansour
  - (13.) Mohamed Sayed Abdulla
  - (14.) Amro Mohamady
  - (15.) Mohamed Mohamed
  - (16.) Wael Mostafa (gk)

Group play

Pos	Team	Pld	W	D	L	GF	GA	GD	Pts	Qualification
1	Australia	5	4	1	0	20	2	+18	9	Semi-finals
2	Germany	5	4	1	0	16	4	+12	9	Semi-finals
3	Great Britain	5	3	0	2	7	10	−3	6	5–8th place semi-finals
4	India	5	2	0	3	4	8	−4	4	5–8th place semi-finals
5	Argentina	5	1	0	4	3	12	−9	2	9–12th place semi-finals
6	Egypt	5	0	0	5	4	18	−14	0	9–12th place semi-finals

Source: FIH

26 July 1992
17:30

Great Britain	2–0	Egypt
Hill 22', 56'	Report

Umpires:
M Iqbal Bali (PAK)
Adriano de Vecchi (ITA)

28 July 1992
16:00

Australia	5–1	Egypt
Stacy 14'; Bodimeade 22', 70+'; Birmingham 37'; Lewis 45'	Report	Magdy 2'

Umpires:
Peter von Reth (NED)
Santiago Deo (ESP)

30 July 1992
16:00

Egypt	0–1	Argentina
	Report	Ferrara 54'

Umpires:
Nikolai Stepanov (URS)
M Iqbal Bali (PAK)

1 August 1992
09:45

Germany	8–2	Egypt
Fischer 10', 14'; Hilgers 19'; Becker 29', 40', 42', 47'; Blunck 38'	Report	A. Gamal 26', 57'

Umpires:
Guillaume Langle (FRA)
Alan Waterman (CAN)

3 August 1992
17:30

India	2–1	Egypt
J. Singh 12'; Nandanoori 21'	Report	F. Gamal 38'

Umpires:
M Iqbal Bali (PAK)
Guillaume Langle (FRA)

9th-12th place classification game

5 August 1992
19:00

Unified Team	4–2	Egypt
Ioultchiev 27', 52'; Sexenbaev 28', 60'	Report	Magdy 18', 32'

Umpires:
Christopher Todd (GBR)
Adriano de Vecchi (ITA)

11th place game

7 August 1992
09:30

Argentina	7–3	Egypt
Ferrara 5', 13', 21', 24', 49', 52'; Geneyro 26'	Report	Ag. Gamal 32'; Abdulla Magdy 35+', 61'

Umpires:
Richard Wolter (GER)
Don Prior (AUS)

== Judo ==
Men

Athlete	Event	Round of 64	Round of 32	Round of 16	Quarterfinals	Semifinals	Repechage			Final	
Athlete	Event	Round of 64	Round of 32	Round of 16	Quarterfinals	Semifinals	Round 1	Round 2	Round 3	Final	
Athlete	Event	Opposition Result	Opposition Result	Opposition Result	Opposition Result	Opposition Result	Opposition Result	Opposition Result	Opposition Result	Opposition Result	Rank
Ahmed El-Sayed	60 kg	Bye	Chen (CHN); L	Did not advance							
Aiman El-Shewy	95 kg	Bye	White (USA); L	Did not advance							

Women

Athlete	Event	Round of 32	Round of 16	Quarterfinals	Semifinals	Repechage			Final	
Athlete	Event	Round of 32	Round of 16	Quarterfinals	Semifinals	Round 1	Round 2	Round 3	Final	
Athlete	Event	Opposition Result	Opposition Result	Opposition Result	Opposition Result	Opposition Result	Opposition Result	Opposition Result	Opposition Result	Rank
Heba Hefny	+72 kg	Gundarenko (EUN); L	Did not advance							

== Modern pentathlon ==
Three male pentathletes represented Egypt in 1992.

Athlete	Event	Fencing (épée one touch)			Swimming (300 m freestyle)			Shooting (Air pistol)			Riding (show jumping)			Running (4000 m)			Total points	Final rank
Athlete	Event	Results	Rank	MP points	Time	Rank	MP points	Points	Rank	MP Points	Penalties	Rank	MP points	Time	Rank	MP Points	Total points	Final rank
Mohamed Abdou El-Souad	Individual	26–39	53	660	3:45.5	64	1068	193	4	1165	140	34	960	13:52.8	40	1069	4922	44
Moustafa Adam	Individual	36–29	18	830	3:35.8	57	1148	189	12	1105	60	14	1040	14:37.4	57	934	5057	34
Sherif El-Erian	Individual	25–40	55	643	3:34.6	55	1156	176	56	910	190	40	910	14:42.1	60	919	4538	60
Mohamed Abdou El-Souad; Moustafa Adam; Sherif El-Erian	Team	87–108	15	2133	10:55.9	17	3372	558	6	3180	390	5	2910	43:12.3	15	2922	14517	14

== Shooting ==
Men

Athlete	Event	Qualification		Final	
Athlete	Event	Points	Rank	Points	Rank
Tarek Riad	10 metre air pistol	569	39	Did not advance	
Tarek Riad	50 metre pistol	556	16	Did not advance	

Open

Athlete	Event	Qualification		Final	
Athlete	Event	Points	Rank	Points	Rank
Mohamed Khorshed	Skeet	144	33	Did not advance	
Khaled Sabet	Skeet	140	51	Did not advance	
Tarek Sabet	Trap	127	52	Did not advance	
Sherif Saleh	Trap	139	33	Did not advance	

== Swimming ==
Men

Athlete	Event	Heats		Final A/B	
Athlete	Event	Time	Rank	Time	Rank
Mohamed El-Azoul	50 metre freestyle	23.87	37	Did not advance	
Mohamed El-Azoul	100 metre freestyle	53.31	52	Did not advance	

Women

Athlete	Event	Heats		Final A/B	
Athlete	Event	Time	Rank	Time	Rank
Rania El-Wani	50 metre freestyle	27.20	32	Did not advance	
Rania El-Wani	100 metre freestyle	58.82	30	Did not advance	
Rania El-Wani	200 metre freestyle	2:08.93	31	Did not advance	
Rania El-Wani	100 metre freestyle	1:10.12	45	Did not advance	

== Table tennis ==
Men

Athlete	Event	Group Stage				Round of 16	Quarterfinal	Semifinal	Final	
Athlete	Event	Opposition Result	Opposition Result	Opposition Result	Rank	Opposition Result	Opposition Result	Opposition Result	Opposition Result	Rank
Ashraf Helmy	Singles	Persson (SWE); L 0–2	Syed (GBR); L 0–2	Chatelain (FRA); L 0–2	4	Did not advance				

Women

Athlete	Event	Group Stage				Round of 16	Quarterfinal	Semifinal	Final	
Athlete	Event	Opposition Result	Opposition Result	Opposition Result	Rank	Opposition Result	Opposition Result	Opposition Result	Opposition Result	Rank
Nihal Meshref	Singles	Popova (EUN) 'L 0–2	Hoshino (JPN); L 0–2	Rodríguez (CUB); W 2–0	3	Did not advance				

== Weightlifting ==
Athlete	Event	Snatch		Clean & jerk		Total	Rank
Athlete	Event	Result	Rank	Result	Rank	Total	Rank
Moustafa Allozy	75 kg	135.0	25	DNF			
Hamdy Basiony Hassan	75 kg	142.5	17	177.5	17	320.0	18
Mahmoud Mahgoub	90 kg	150.0	13	180.0	16	330.0	16
Ibrahim El-Bakh	110 kg	DNF					
Reda El-Batoty	+110 kg	160.0	16	200.0	13	360.0	15

== Wrestling ==
Greco-Roman

Athlete	Event	Group Stage							Final	
Athlete	Event	Opposition Result	Opposition Result	Opposition Result	Opposition Result	Opposition Result	Opposition Result	Rank	Opposition Result	Rank
Ahmed Ibrahim	62 kg	Bódi (HUN); L 0–6	Martínez (ESP); L 1–4	Did not advance				8	Did not advance	
Mohyeldin Ramadan Hussein	82 kg	Henderson (USA); L 0–4	Farkas (HUN); L 0–2	Did not advance				8	Did not advance	
Moustafa Ramadan Hussein	90 kg	Bullmann (GER); L 0–5	Bye	Babak (IRI); L 1–2	Did not advance			7	Did not advance	
