= India at the 1992 Summer Olympics =

- IOC code: IND
- NOC: Indian Olympic Association

in Barcelona
- Competitors: 53 in 12 sports
- Flag bearer: Shiny Wilson
- Medals: Gold 0 Silver 0 Bronze 0 Total 0

Summer Olympics appearances (overview)
- 1900; 1904–1912; 1920; 1924; 1928; 1932; 1936; 1948; 1952; 1956; 1960; 1964; 1968; 1972; 1976; 1980; 1984; 1988; 1992; 1996; 2000; 2004; 2008; 2012; 2016; 2020; 2024

India competed at the 1992 Summer Olympics in Barcelona, Spain.

== Competitors ==
The following is the list of number of competitors in the Games.

Sport	Men	Women	Total
Archery	3	0	3
Athletics	1	1	2
Badminton	2	1	3
Boxing	5	–	5
Field hockey	15	0	15
Judo	4	1	5
Sailing	2	0	2
Shooting	0	2	2
Table tennis	3	1	4
Tennis	2	0	2
Weightlifting	3	–	3
wrestling	6	–	6
Total	46	6	52

== Archery ==
In India's second appearance in Olympic archery, the nation was represented by three men.

Athlete	Event	Ranking Round		Round of 32	Round of 16	Quarter Finals	Semi Finals	Final	
		Score	Rank	Opposition Result	Opposition Result	Opposition Result	Opposition Result	Opposition Result	Rank
Limba Ram	Men's Individual	1306	23	Claude Rousseau (CAN) L 102–100	Did Not Advance				
Lalremsanga Chhangte	Men's Individual	1243	53	Did Not Advance					
Dhulchand Damor	Men's Individual	1212	66	Did Not Advance					
Dhulchand Damor Lalremsanga Chhangte Limba Ram	Men's Team	3761	15	N/A	Unified Team L 220–241	Did Not Advance			

== Athletics ==
Athlete	Event	Heats		Semi Finals		Final	
		Time	Rank	Time	Rank	Time	Rank
Bahadur Prasad	Men's 5000m	13:50.71	8	N/A		Did Not Advance	
Shiny Wilson	Women's 800m	2:01.90	4	Did Not Advance			
Abraham Yohan George	Men's 100m	10.33	4	Did Not Advance			

== Badminton ==
Athlete	Event	Round of 64	Round of 32	Round of 16	Quarter Finals	Semi Finals	Final	
Athlete	Event	Opposition Result	Opposition Result	Opposition Result	Opposition Result	Opposition Result	Opposition Result	Rank
Deepankar Bhattacharya	Men's Singles	Ivan Ivanov (BUL) Win 15–4, 15–1	Hannes Fuchs (AUT) Win 8–15, 15–11, 15–11	Zhao Jianhua (CHN) Loss 4–15, 12–15	Did Not Advance			
Madhumita Bisht	Women's Singles	Elsa Nielsen (ISL) Win 11–3, 11–0	Joanne Muggeridge (GBR) Loss 7–11, 8–11	Did Not Advance				
Deepankar Bhattacharya Vimal Kumar	Men's Doubles	N/A	R. Sidek/ J. Sidek (MAS) Loss 6–15, 3–15	Did Not Advance				

== Boxing ==
Athlete	Event	Round of 32	Round of 16	Quarter Finals	Semifinals	Final	
Athlete	Event	Opposition Result	Opposition Result	Opposition Result	Opposition Result	Opposition Result	Rank
Rajendra Prasad	Men's Light Flyweight (48 kg)	Andrzej Rżany (POL)W 12–6	Roel Velasco (PHI) L 6–15	Did Not Advance			
Dharmendra Yadav	Men's Flyweight (51 kg)	István Kovács (HUN) L 5-21	Did Not Advance				
Devarajan Venkatesan	Men's Bantamweight (54 kg)	Joel Casamayor (CUB) L 7–13	Did Not Advance				
Narendar Bisth Singh	Men's Featherweight (57 kg)	Carlos Gerena (PUR) L 11–20	Did Not Advance				
Sandeep Gollen	Men's Light welterweight (63 kg)	Laid Bouneb (ALG) L 4–11	Did Not Advance				

== Field Hockey ==
=== Team roster ===
- (01.) Anjaparavanda Subbaiah (gk)
- (02.) Cheppudira Poonacha
- (03.) Jagdaev Rai
- (04.) Harpeet Singh
- (05.) Sukhjit Singh
- (06.) Shakeel Ahmed
- (07.) Mukesh Kumar
- (08.) Jude Felix
- (09.) Jagbir Singh
- (10.) Dhanraj Pillay
- (11.) Didar Singh
- (12.) Ashish Ballal (gk)
- (13.) Pargat Singh (captain)
- (14.) Ravi Nayakar
- (15.) Darryl d'Souza
- (16.) Ajit Lakra

=== Preliminary round ===
==== Group A ====
Pos	Team	Pld	W	D	L	GF	GA	GD	Pts	Qualification
1	Australia	5	4	1	0	20	2	+18	9	Semi-finals
2	Germany	5	4	1	0	16	4	+12	9	Semi-finals
3	Great Britain	5	3	0	2	7	10	−3	6	5–8th place semi-finals
4	India	5	2	0	3	4	8	−4	4	5–8th place semi-finals
5	Argentina	5	1	0	4	3	12	−9	2	9–12th place semi-finals
6	Egypt	5	0	0	5	4	18	−14	0	9–12th place semi-finals

Source: FIH

26 July 1992
16:00

India	0–3	Germany
	Report	Blunck 18'; Fischer 50'; Tewes 62'

Umpires:
Alan Waterman (CAN)
Santiago Deo (ESP)

28 July 1992
09:45

India	1–0	Argentina
Powar 5'	Report

Umpires:
Nikolai Stepanov (URS)
Adriano de Vecchi (ITA)

30 July 1992
10:15

Great Britain	3–1	India
Hill 19'; Kerly 60'; Thompson 63'	Report	Sebastian 53'

Umpires:
Peter von Reth (NED)
Jose Gortazar (ESP)

1 August 1992
20:00

Australia	1–0	India
Stacy 3'	Report

Umpires:
Jose Gortazar (ESP)
Adriano de Vecchi (ITA)

3 August 1992
17:30

India	2–1	Egypt
J. Singh 12'; Nandanoori 21'	Report	F. Gamal 38'

Umpires:
M Iqbal Bali (PAK)
Guillaume Langle (FRA)

=== Classification matches ===
==== 5–8th place semi-finals ====
5 August 1992
09:45

Spain	2–0	India
Iglesias 40'; Freixa 57'	Report

Umpires:
Graham Nash (GBR)
Alan Waterman (CAN)

==== 7th Place Game ====
6 August 1992
17:00

New Zealand	2–3	India
C. Russ 13'; Radovonich 52'	Report	Powar 6'; Kumar 35', 41'

Umpires:
Nikolai Stepanov (CIS)
Peter von Reth (NED)

== Judo ==
Athlete	Event	Round of 64	Round of 32	Round of 16	Quarterfinals	Semifinals	Repechage	Final / BM	
Athlete	Event	Opposition Result	Opposition Result	Opposition Result	Opposition Result	Opposition Result	Opposition Result	Opposition Result	Rank
Narinder Singh	Men's −60 kg	Ahmed El-Sayed (EGY) L E - WAZ	Did Not Advance						
Sandeep Byala	Men's −65 kg	Bye	Sorahi (YEM) W IPO-E	Cantin (CAN) L E-YUS	Did Not Advance				
Rajinder Kumar Dhange	Men's −86 kg	Bye	Hirotaka Okada (JPN) L E-IPO	Did Not Advance					
Cawas Billimoria	Men's − +95 kg	N/A	Ernesto Pérez (ESP) L E-W	Did Not Advance					
Sangita Mehta	Women's −72+ kg	N/A	Bye	Supatra Yompakdee (THA) L E-IPO	Did Not Advance				

== Sailing ==
Helmsman	Crew	Total	Total -1	Rank
Farokh Tarapore	Cyrus Cama	191	147	23

== Shooting ==
Athlete	Event	Qualification		Final	
		Score	Rank	Score	Rank
Soma Dutta	Women's 50 m rifle three positions	572	22	Did Not Advance	
Soma Dutta	Women's 10 m air rifle	383	35	Did Not Advance	
Abha Dhillan	Women's 10 m air pistol	366	45	Did Not Advance	

== Table Tennis ==
Athlete	Event	Group Stage				Round of 16	Quarter Finals	Semi Finals	Final	
Athlete	Event	Opposition Result	Opposition Result	Opposition Result	Rank	Opposition Result	Opposition Result	Opposition Result	Opposition Result	Rank
Kamlesh Mehta	Men's Singles	Kim Taek-Soo (KOR) Loss 1–2	Lü Lin (CHN) Win 2–0	Abdelhadi Legdali (MAR) Win 2–0	2	Did Not Advance				
Chetan Baboor	Men's Singles	Carl Prean (GBR) Loss 0–2	Choi Kyong-sob (PRK) Loss 0–2	Roberto Casares (ESP) Loss 1–2	4	Did Not Advance				
Niyati Roy-Shah	Women's Singles	Otilia Badescu (ROU) Loss 0–2	Jasna Fazlić-Reed (IOP) Loss 0-2	Marisel Ramírez (CUB) Win 2–0	3	Did Not Advance				

== Tennis ==
Athlete	Event	Round of 64	Round of 32	Round of 16	Quarter Finals	Semi Finals	Final	
Athlete	Event	Opposition Result	Opposition Result	Opposition Result	Opposition Result	Opposition Result	Opposition Result	Rank
Leander Paes	Men's Singles	Jaime Yzaga (PER) Loss 6–1, 6–7, 0–6, 0–6	Did Not Advance					
Ramesh Krishnan	Men's Singles	Jim Courier (USA) Loss 2–6, 6–4, 6–1, 6–4	Did Not Advance					
Leander Paes Ramesh Krishnan	Men's Doubles	N/A	I Božič / B Trupej (SLO) Win 6–3, 6–2, 6–2	J Fitzgerald / T Woodbridge (AUS) Win 6–4, 7–5, 4–6, 6–1	G Ivanišević / G Prpić (CRO) Loss 6–7, 7–5, 4–6, 3–6	Did Not Advance		

== Weightlifting ==
Athlete	Event	Snatch	Clean & Jerk	Total	Rank
Athlete	Event	Result	Result	Total	Rank
Badathala Adisekhar	Men's −52 kg	97.5	125	222.5	10
Ponnuswamy Rangaswamy	Men's −56 kg	102.5	127.5	230	18
Sivaraj Naalamuthu Pillai	Men's −60 kg	115.0	140.0	255.0	22

== Wrestling ==
4 wrestlers in Men's Freestyle and 2 in Men's Greco Roman has represented India in the 1992 Summer Olympics.

Athlete	Event	Elimination Group Stage							Classification Match	
Athlete	Event	Round 1 Opposition Result	Round 2 Opposition Result	Round 3 Opposition Result	Round 4 Opposition Result	Round 5 Opposition Result	Round 6 Opposition Result	Rank	Opposition Result	Rank
Anil Kumar	Men's freestyle 52 kg	Orel (TUR) L 0-4 ^{ST}	Torkan (IRI) L 0-4 ^{ST}	Did Not Advance				-	Did Not Advance	
Ashok Kumar Garg	Men's freestyle 57 kg	Mallah (IRI) L 1-3 ^{PP}	Musaoğlu (TUR) L 0-3 ^{PO}	Did Not Advance				-	Did Not Advance	
Dharan Singh Dahiya	Men's freestyle 62 kg	Moustopoulos (GRE) L 1-3 ^{PP}	Müller (SUI) L 1-3 ^{PP}	Did Not Avance				-	Did Not Advance	
Subhash Verma	Men's freestyle 100 kg	Bourdoulis (GRE) W 3-0 ^{PO}	Aavik (EST) W 3-0 ^{PO}	Gholami (IRI) W 3-1 ^{PP}	Coleman (USA) L 1-3 ^{PP}	Tae-woo (KOR) L 1-3 ^{PP}	N/A	3	Radomski (POL) W 0-3 ^{PO}	6
Pappu Yadav	Men's Greco-Roman 48 kg	Faragó (HUN) W 4-0 ^{SU}	Hassoun (SYR) W 3-1 ^{PP}	Simkhah (IRI) L 1-3 ^{PP}	Maenza (ITA) L 0-4 ^{ST}	Did Not Advance	N/A	4	Rønningen (NOR) L WO	8
Mohan Ramchandra Patil	Men's Greco-Roman 62 kg	Pazaj (IRI) L 1-3 ^{PP}	Dietsche (SUI) L 0-3 ^{PO}	Did Not Advance				-	Did Not Advance	
