= Malaysia at the 1992 Summer Olympics =

- IOC code: MAS
- NOC: Olympic Council of Malaysia

in Barcelona
- Competitors: 26 in 6 sports
- Flag bearer: Razif Sidek
- Medals Ranked 54th: Gold 0 Silver 0 Bronze 1 Total 1

Summer Olympics appearances (overview)
- 1956; 1960; 1964; 1968; 1972; 1976; 1980; 1984; 1988; 1992; 1996; 2000; 2004; 2008; 2012; 2016; 2020; 2024; 2028

Other related appearances
- North Borneo (1956)

Malaysia competed at the 1992 Summer Olympics in Barcelona, Spain. 26 competitors, all men, took part in 11 events in 6 sports. The nation won its first ever Olympic medal at these Games.

== Medal summary ==
=== Medals by sport ===
Sport	Gold	Silver	Bronze	Total	Rank
Badminton	0	0	1	1	4
Total	0	0	1	1	54

=== Medallist ===
Medal	Name	Sport	Event	Date
Bronze	Razif Sidek; Jalani Sidek	Badminton	Men's doubles	3 August

== Competitors ==
The following is the list of number of competitors in the Games.

Sport	Men	Women	Total
Athletics	1	0	1
Badminton	6	0	6
Cycling	1	0	1
Field hockey	16	0	16
Shooting	1	0	1
Swimming	1	0	1
Total	26	0	26

== Athletics ==
Key

- Note–Ranks given for track events are within the athlete's heat only
- Q = Qualified for the next round
- q = Qualified for the next round as a fastest loser or, in field events, by position without achieving the qualifying target
- NR = National record
- N/A = Round not applicable for the event
- Bye = Athlete not required to compete in round

Men
Track event

Athlete	Event	Heat		Quarterfinal		Semifinal		Final	
Athlete	Event	Result	Rank	Result	Rank	Result	Rank	Result	Rank
Nur Herman Majid	110 m hurdles	14.34	7	did not advance					

== Badminton ==
Athlete	Event	Round of 64	Round of 32	Round of 16	Quarterfinal	Semifinal	Final	Rank
Athlete	Event	Opposition Score	Opposition Score	Opposition Score	Opposition Score	Opposition Score	Opposition Score	Rank
Foo Kok Keong	Men's singles	Hans Sperre jr. (NOR); W 15–11, 15–3	Tomáš Mendrek (TCH); W 15–2, 15–3	Ardy Wiranata (INA); L 4–15, 6–15	Did not advance			
Rashid Sidek (2)	Men's singles	Bye	Hideaki Motoyama (JPN); W 15–3, 15–2	Wong Wai Lap (HKG); W 15–2, 15–3	Thomas Stuer-Lauridsen (DEN); L 2–15, 8–15	Did not advance		
Cheah Soon Kit; Soo Beng Kiang	Men's doubles	—N/a	Li Yongbo; Tian Bingyi (CHN); L 15–11, 15–18, 4–15	Did not advance				
Razif Sidek; Jalani Sidek	Men's doubles	—N/a	U. Vimal Kumar; Dipankar Bhattacharjee (IND); W 15–6, 15–3	Jon Holst-Christensen; Thomas Lund (DEN); W 15–12, 15–6	Shuji Matsuno; Shinji Matsuura (JPN); W 15–5, 15–4	Kim Moon-soo; Park Joo-bong (KOR); L 11–15, 13–15	Did not advance	3rd place, bronze medalist(s)

== Cycling ==
One cyclist represented Malaysia in 1992.

=== Road ===
Athlete	Event	Time	Rank
Murugayan Kumaresan	Men's individual road race	DNF	

=== Track ===
Pursuit

Athlete	Event	Qualification		Round 1		Semifinal		Final	
Athlete	Event	Opponent Result	Rank	Opponent Result	Rank	Opponent Result	Rank	Opponent Result	Rank
Murugayan Kumaresan	Men's individual pursuit	Weng Yu-yi (TPE); W 4:59.049	22	Did not advance					

Points race

Athlete	Event	Qualification		Final	
Athlete	Event	Points	Rank	Points	Rank
Murugayan Kumaresan	Men's points race	11	21	Did not advance	

== Hockey ==
=== Men's tournament ===
Team roster

- Ahmed Fadzil Zainal Abidin (GK)
- Paul Lopez (GK)
- Tai Beng Hai
- Suppiah Suria Ghandi
- Lim Chiow Chuan
- Sarjit Singh (c)
- Gary Fidelis
- Brian Jaya Siva
- Shankar Ramu
- Nor Saiful Zaini Nasiruddin
- Dharma Raj Kanniah
- Mohamed Abdul Hadj
- Mirnawan Nawawi
- Lailin Abu Hassan
- Soon Mustafa Karim
- Aanantha Sambu Mayavo

Head coach: (Australia) Terry Walsh

Group B

Teams	P	W	D	L	GF	GA	GD	Pts
Pakistan	5	5	0	0	20	6	+14	10
Netherlands	5	4	0	1	20	10	+10	8
Spain	5	3	0	2	15	11	+4	6
New Zealand	5	1	0	4	7	12	–5	2
CIS	5	1	0	4	12	20	–8	2
Malaysia	5	1	0	4	9	24	–15	2

Qualified for semifinals

26 July 1992

Pakistan	4 – 1	Malaysia
Bajwa 8', 24'; Bashir 29'; Zaman 41'	Report	Nasiruddin 17'

Umpires:
Richard Heinz Wolter (GER)
Patrick van Beneden (BEL)

28 July 1992

CIS	7 – 3	Malaysia
Plechakov 2', 58'; Ioultchiev 30', 48'; Seksembayev 55', 68'; Nechayev 65'	Report	Nawawi 9'; Lim 20'; Nasiruddin 35'

Umpires:
Kyoshi Sana (JPN)
Graham Dennis Nash (GBR)

30 July 1992

Spain	5 – 2	Malaysia

1 August 1992

Malaysia	3 – 2	New Zealand

3 August 1992

Netherlands	6 – 0	Malaysia

Ninth to twelfth place classification

5 August 1992

Argentina	4 – 6 (a.e.t.)	Malaysia
Ferrara 49', 64'; Allona 60'	Report	Nawawi 44', 57', 61'

Umpires:
T.S. Bhullar (IND)
Claude Seidler (GER)

Ninth and tenth place match

7 August 1992

Malaysia	4 – 3	CIS
Nawawi 17', 34'; Nasiruddin 50'; Sambu 68'	Report	Ioultchiev 11'; Seksembayev 13', 38'

Umpires:
Jose Luis Gortazar (ESP)
Guillaume Langle (FRA)

Ranked 9th in final standings

== Shooting ==
Mixed

Athlete	Event	Qualification		Semifinal		Final	
Athlete	Event	Points	Rank	Points	Rank	Points	Rank
Kaw Fun Ying	Skeet	144	33	Did not advance			

== Swimming ==
Men

Athlete	Events	Round 1		Final B		Final A	
Athlete	Events	Time	Rank	Time	Rank	Time	Rank
Jeffrey Ong	200 m freestyle	1:55.37	36	Did not advance			
Jeffrey Ong	400 m freestyle	4:02.28	37	Did not advance			
Jeffrey Ong	1500 m freestyle	15:51.41	20	—N/a		Did not advance	
