= 1990 Men's Hockey World Cup =

1990 Hockey World Cup
مردوں کا ہاکی عالمی کپ 1990ء (Urdu)

Tournament details
- Host country: Pakistan
- City: Lahore
- Dates: 12–23 February 1990
- Teams: 12 (from 4 confederations)
- Venue: National Hockey Stadium

Final positions
- Champions: Netherlands (2nd title)
- Runner-up: Pakistan
- Third place: Australia

Tournament statistics
- Matches played: 42
- Goals scored: 147 (3.5 per match)
- Top scorer(s): (Netherlands) Floris Jan Bovelander (Spain) Ignacio Escudé (9 goals)
- Best player: (Pakistan) Shahbaz Ahmed

The 1990 Men's Hockey World Cup was the seventh edition of the Hockey World Cup, the quadrennial world championship for men's national field hockey teams organized by the FIH. It was held in the National Hockey Stadium in Lahore, Pakistan from 12 to 23 February 1990.

The Netherlands defeated, the hosts, Pakistan 3–1 in the final, with Australia beating out West Germany for third place in extra time, 2–1.

== Qualification ==
Event	Dates	Location	Quotas	Qualifier(s)
Host	—N/a	—N/a	1	Pakistan
1986 World Cup	5–19 October 1986	London, England	6	Australia; England; West Germany; Soviet Union; Spain; Argentina
1989 World Cup Qualifier	5–16 July 1989	Madison, United States	5	Netherlands; Canada; India; France; Ireland
Total			12	

== Umpires ==
- S Eldine Ahmed (EGY)
- Shafat Baghdadi (PAK)
- Khizar Bajwa (PAK)
- Amarjit Bawa (IND)
- Adriano de Vecchi (ITA)
- Santiago Deo (ESP)
- Amjarit Dhak (KEN)
- K O'Connor (CAN)
- Don Prior (AUS)
- Alain Renaud (FRA)
- Eduardo Ruiz (ARG)
- Iwo Sakaida (JPN)
- Claude Seidler (FRG)
- Nikolai Stepanov (URS)
- Patrick van Beneden (BEL)
- Peter von Reth (NED)
- Roger Webb (ENG)

== Group stage ==
=== Pool A ===
Pos	Team	Pld	W	D	L	GF	GA	GD	Pts	Qualification
1	Australia	5	5	0	0	14	4	+10	10	Advance to the semi-finals
2	Netherlands	5	3	1	1	15	10	+5	7	Advance to the semi-finals
3	France	5	2	1	2	5	6	−1	5	5th–8th place classification
4	Soviet Union	5	1	2	2	6	10	−4	4	5th–8th place classification
5	Argentina	5	1	1	3	10	14	−4	3	9th–12th place classification
6	India	5	0	1	4	10	16	−6	1	9th–12th place classification

Source: FIH

12 February 1990
08:30

Netherlands	2–1	France
Delissen 16', 59'	Report	Catonnet 54'

Umpires:
Santiago Deo (ESP)
Eldine Ahmed S (EGY)

12 February 1990
10:30

Soviet Union	1–1	India
Holopov 52'	Report	J. Singh 39'

Umpires:
Claude Seidler (FRG)
Khizar Bajwa (PAK)

13 February 1990
09:00

Australia	4–1	Argentina
Reid 28'; York 53', 60'; Corbitt 58'	Report	Sordelli 52'

Umpires:
Iwo Sakaida (JPN)
Amjarit Dhak (KEN)

13 February 1990
11:00

Netherlands	5–2	Soviet Union
Bovelander 8', 24', 32'; Delissen 49'; Van 't Hek 61'	Report	Deputatov 17'; Seksembal 27'

Umpires:
Roger Webb (ENG)
K O'Connor (CAN)

14 February 1990
09:00

India	3–5	Argentina
Sebastian 7'; J. Singh 19'; A. Kumar 40'	Report	Ferrara 24', 33'; Geneyro 51', 62'; Doherty 67'

Umpires:
Santiago Deo (ESP)
Patrick van Beneden (BEL)

14 February 1990
11:00

France	1–3	Australia
Viala 7'	Report	Davies 17', 38'; Corbitt 65'

Umpires:
Claude Seidler (FRG)
Shafat Baghdadi (PAK)

15 February 1990
11:00

France	2–1	India
Catonnet 23'; Viala 66'	Report	T. Singh 12'

Umpires:
Iwo Sakaida (JPN)
K O'Connor (CAN)

16 February 1990
11:00

Soviet Union	0–3	Australia
	Report	York 6'; Hawgood 52'; Corbitt 59'

Umpires:
Shafat Baghdadi (PAK)
Adriano de Vecchi (ITA)

16 February 1990
15:00

Netherlands	3–3	Argentina
Bovelander 5', 38'; Delissen 36'	Report	Geneyro 33'; Ferrara 57'; Doherty 70'

Umpires:
Roger Webb (ENG)
Khizar Bajwa (PAK)

17 February 1990
11：00

France	0–0	Soviet Union
	Report

Umpires:
Roger Webb (ENG)
Claude Seidler (FRG)

17 February 1990
15:00

Netherlands	5–3	India
Weterings 7', 58'; Delissen 9'; Crucq 62'; Van 't Hek 66'	Report	J. Singh 65'; B. Singh 67'; Pillay 70'

Umpires:
Adriano de Vecchi (ITA)
S Eldine Ahmed (EGY)

18 February 1990
11:00

France	1–0	Argentina
Feix 58'	Report

Umpires:
Santiago Deo (ESP)
Shafat Baghdadi (PAK)

18 February 1990
15:00

India	2–3	Australia
S. Kumar 47'; Sebastian 70'	Report	Batch 38'; Corbitt 44'; Reid 45'

Umpires:
Khizar Bajwa (PAK)
K O'Connor (CAN)

19 February 1990
11:00

Soviet Union	3–1	Argentina
Pleshakov 29'; Holopov 60'; Vengerski 69'	Report	Siri 41'

Umpires:
Adriano de Vecchi (ITA)
Patrick van Beneden (BEL)

19 February 1990
15:00

Netherlands	0–1	Australia
	Report	Batch 30'

Umpires:
Claude Seidler (FRG)
Santiago Deo (ESP)

=== Pool B ===
Pos	Team	Pld	W	D	L	GF	GA	GD	Pts	Qualification
1	West Germany	5	5	0	0	13	2	+11	10	Advance to the semi-finals
2	Pakistan (H)	5	3	1	1	10	6	+4	7	Advance to the semi-finals
3	Spain	5	3	0	2	10	10	0	6	5th–8th place classification
4	England	5	2	1	2	7	7	0	5	5th–8th place classification
5	Canada	5	0	1	4	2	9	−7	1	9th–12th place classification
6	Ireland	5	0	1	4	3	11	−8	1	9th–12th place classification

Source: FIH
(H) Hosts

12 February 1990
12:30

Ireland	0–2	England
	Report	Kerly 41'; Grimley 50'

Umpires:
Alain Renaud (FRA)
Patrick van Beneden (BEL)

12 February 1990
15:15

Pakistan	6–3	Spain
Ibrahim 8'; Ahmed 14', 22', 34'; Bashir 39'; Zaman 64'	Report	Casas 24'; I. Escudé 48', 50'

Umpires:
Adriano de Vecchi (ITA)
Nikolai Stepanov (URS)

13 February 1990
13:00

West Germany	4–1	Canada
Ness 11'; Blöcher 28', 65'; Mollandin 53'	Report	Tamkee 18'

Umpires:
Eduardo Ruiz (ARG)
Peter von Reth (NED)

13 February 1990
15:00

Pakistan	2–1	Ireland
Bashir 14'; Zaman 33'	Report	Kirkwood 21'

Umpires:
Don Prior (AUS)
Amarjit Bawa (IND)

14 February 1990
13:00

England	2–0	Canada
Thompson 4'; Grimley 27'	Report

Umpires:
Don Prior (AUS)
Nikolai Stepanov (URS)

14 February 1990
15:00

West Germany	2–0	Spain
Schmidt-Opper 8'; Saliger 69'	Report

Umpires:
Alain Renaud (FRA)
S Eldine Ahmed (EGY)

15 February 1990
13:00

Spain	4–1	England
Usoz 23'; I. Escudé 42', 63', 65'	Report	Kerly 29'

Umpires:
Eduardo Ruiz (ARG)
Amarjit Bawa (IND)

16 February 1990
09:00

Ireland	0–4	West Germany
	Report	Blöcher 10', 56'; Saliger 44'; Brinkmann 55'

Umpires:
Nikolai Stepanov (URS)
Amjarit Dhak (KEN)

16 February 1990
13:00

Pakistan	1–0	Canada
Zaman 24'	Report

Umpires:
Peter von Reth (NED)
Alain Renaud (FRA)

17 February 1990
09:00

Spain	2–1	Ireland
I. Escudé 29', 50'	Report	M. Burns 37'

Umpires:
Iwo Sakaida (JPN)
Peter von Reth (NED)

17 February 1990
13:00

Pakistan	1–1	England
Bashir 50'	Report	Mayer 23'

Umpires:
Don Prior (AUS)
Eduardo Ruiz (ARG)

18 February 1990
09:00

Spain	1–0	Canada
X. Escudé 51'	Report

Umpires:
Amjarit Dhak (KEN)
Nikolai Stepanov (URS)

18 February 1990
13:00

England	1–2	West Germany
Singh 61'	Report	Fischer 18'; Fried 38'

Umpires:
Patrick van Beneden (BEL)
Amarjit Bawa (IND)

19 February 1990
09:00

Ireland	1–1	Canada
K. Morris 35'	Report	Milkovich 27'

Umpires:
Amjarit Dhak (KEN)
Iwo Sakaida (JPN)

19 February 1990
13:00

Pakistan	0–1	West Germany
	Report	Hilgers 54'

Umpires:
Alain Renaud (FRA)
Eduardo Ruiz (ARG)

== Classification round ==
=== Ninth to twelfth place classification ===
Cross-overs
22 February
India	2
Canada	1
22 February
Argentina	4
Ireland	1

Ninth place
23 February
India	0
Argentina	1
Eleventh place
23 February
Canada	3
Ireland	0

==== Cross-overs ====
22 February 1990
09:00

India	2–1	Canada
Sebastian 57'; Powar 61'	Report	Tamkee 32'

Umpires:
Shafat Baghdadi (PAK)
Don Prior (AUS)

22 February 1990
09:00

Argentina	4–1	Ireland
Geneyro 37', 44', 55'; Verga 67'	Report	McConnell 3'

Umpires:
Khizar Bajwa (PAK)
Nikolai Stepanov (URS)

==== Eleventh and twelfth place ====
23 February 1990
10:00

Canada	3–0	Ireland
Chohan 18'; Rutledge 21'; Caruso 67'	Report

Umpires:
S Eldine Ahmed (EGY)
Peter von Reth (NED)

==== Ninth and tenth place ====
23 February 1990
09:00

India	0–1	Argentina
	Report	Geneyro 54'

Umpires:
K O'Connor (CAN)
Iwo Sakaida (JPN)

=== Fifth to eighth place classification ===
Cross-overs
21 February
Soviet Union	3
Spain	0
21 February
France	0
England	4

Fifth place
22 February
Soviet Union	0
England	1
Seventh place
22 February
Spain	3
France (a.e.t.)	4

==== Cross-overs ====
21 February 1990
09:00

Soviet Union	3–0	Spain
Deputatov 21', 68'; Holopov 40'	Report

Umpires:
Amarjit Bawa (IND)
Alain Renaud (FRA)

21 February 1990
09:00

France	0–4	England
	Report	Thompson 25'; Clift 34'; Kerly 52', 57'

Umpires:
Don Prior (AUS)
Claude Seidler (FRG)

==== Seventh and eighth place ====
22 February 1990
12:15

Spain	3–4 (a.e.t.)	France
Iglesias 25'; I. Escudé 53', 72'	Report	Clement 38'; Mordac 68'; Chirez 85'; Delavenne 88'

Umpires:
Amjarit Dhak (KEN)
Roger Webb (ENG)

==== Fifth and sixth place ====
22 February 1990
14:45

Soviet Union	0–1	England
	Report	Clift 32'

Umpires:
Peter von Reth (NED)
Amarjit Bawa (IND)

=== First to fourth place classification ===
Semi-finals
21 February
Netherlands (a.e.t.)	3
West Germany	2
21 February
Australia	1
Pakistan	2

Final
23 February
Netherlands	3
Pakistan	1
Third place
23 February
West Germany	1
Australia	2

==== Semi-finals ====
21 February 1990
12:15

Netherlands	3–2 (a.e.t.)	West Germany
Bovelander 31', 78'; Delissen 65'	Report	Fischer 56', 67'

Umpires:
Eduardo Ruiz (ARG)
Patrick van Beneden (BEL)

21 February 1990
14:45

Australia	1–2	Pakistan
Corbitt 10'	Report	Saeed 3'; Bashir 44'

Umpires:
Santiago Deo (ESP)
Adriano de Vecchi (ITA)

==== Third and fourth place ====
23 February 1990
12:00

West Germany	1–2	Australia
Fischer 57'	Report	Stacy 8'; Hawgood 42'

Umpires:
Alain Renaud (FRA)
Adriano de Vecchi (ITA)

==== Final ====
23 February 1990
14:30

Netherlands	3–1	Pakistan
Bovelander 12', 14'; Weterings 37'	Report	Ahmed 5'

Umpires:
Eduardo Ruiz (ARG)
Santiago Deo (ESP)

== Statistics ==
=== Final standings ===
1. Netherlands
2. Pakistan
3. Australia
4. West Germany
5. England
6. Soviet Union
7. France
8. Spain
9. Argentina
10. India
11. Canada
12. Ireland

=== Goalscorers ===
There were 147 goals scored in 42 matches, for an average of 3.5 goals per match.

9 goals

- (Netherlands) Floris Jan Bovelander
- (Spain) Ignacio Escude

7 goals

- (Argentina) Carlos Geneyro

6 goals

- (Netherlands) Marc Delissen

5 goals

- (Australia) Greg Corbitt

4 goals

- (England) Sean Kerly
- (Pakistan) Shahbaz Ahmed
- (West Germany) Stefan Blocher
- (West Germany) Carsten Fischer

3 goals

- (Argentina) Fernando Ferrara
- (Australia) Michael York
- (India) Jude Felix Sebastian
- (India) Jagbir Singh
- (Netherlands) Gijs Weterings
- (Pakistan) Khalid Bashir
- (Pakistan) Tahir Zaman
- (Soviet Union) Viktor Deputatov
- (Soviet Union) Vitali Holopov

2 goals

- (Argentina) Alejandro Doherty
- (Australia) Colin Batch
- (Australia) Stephen Davies
- (Australia) Neil Hawgood
- (Australia) Graham Reid
- (Canada) Lee Tamkee
- (England) Robert Clift
- (England) Martyn Grimley
- (England) Nicky Thompson
- (France) Mathieu Catonnet
- (France) Christian Viala
- (Netherlands) Tom van 't Hek
- (West Germany) Stefan Saliger

1 goal

- (Argentina) Alejandro Siri
- (Argentina) Martin Sordelli
- (Argentina) Alejandro Verga
- (Australia) Jay Stacy
- (Canada) Pat Caruso
- (Canada) Satinder Chohan
- (Canada) Peter Milkovich
- (Canada) Michael Rutledge
- (England) Chris Mayer
- (England) Soma Singh
- (France) Franck Chirez
- (France) Guillaume Clement
- (France) Timotkee Delavenne
- (France) Pascal Feix
- (France) Stephanc Mordac
- (India) Ashok Kumar
- (India) Sujit Kumar
- (India) Dhanraj Pillay
- (India) Balwinder Singh
- (India) Pargat Singh
- (India) Thoiba Singh
- (Ireland) Mark Burns
- (Ireland) Jimmy Kirkwood
- (Ireland) Billy McConnell
- (Ireland) Kenny Morris
- (Netherlands) Maurits Crucq
- (Pakistan) Qamar Ibrahim
- (Pakistan) Qazi Mohib
- (Pakistan) Anjum Saeed
- (Soviet Union) Sergei Pleshakov
- (Soviet Union) Berig Seksembal
- (Soviet Union) Victor Vengerski
- (Spain) Jordi Casas
- (Spain) Xavier Escude
- (Spain) José Antonio Iglesias
- (Spain) Pablo Usoz
- (West Germany) Thomas Brinkmann
- (West Germany) Volker Fried
- (West Germany) Michael Hilgers
- (West Germany) Andreas Mollandin
- (West Germany) Frederick Ness
- (West Germany) Ekkhard Schmidt-Opper

Source: FIH
