= Aleksandr Krasnoyartsev =

Aleksandr Krasnoyartsev may refer to:

- Aleksandr Krasnoyartsev (born 1971), Soviet field hockey player
- Alexander Vasilyevich Krasnoyartsev (born 1986), Russian pilot and war criminal
