= Mohamed Mohamed =

Mohamed Mohamed is the name of:

== Politics ==
- Mohamed Abdi Mohamed or Mohamed Gandhi, Somali geologist, anthropologist, historian and politician
- Mohamed Abdoulkader Mohamed (born 1951), Djiboutian FRUD politician
- Mohamed Abdullahi Mohamed (born 1962), President of Somalia
- Mohamed Ali Mohamed (born 1952), Djiboutian PDP politician
- Mohamed Ali Ould Sidi Mohamed, Mauritanian politician
- Mohamed Haniffa Mohamed (1921–2016), Sri Lankan politician
- Mohamed Mahdi Marboua (1944-2020), Central African military officer and politician.
- Mohammed Mohammed, Nigerian diplomat

== Sports ==
- Mohamed Abdel Mohamed (born 1968), Egyptian handball player
- Mohamed Ben Mohamed (born 1938), Moroccan Olympic cyclist
- Mohamed Daud Mohamed (born 1996), Somali long-distance runner
- Mohamed Hassan Mohamed (born 1993), Somali middle-distance runner
- Mohamed Hassan A Mohamed or Mizo Amin (born 1991), Qatari basketball player
- Mohamed Samir Mohamed (born 1971), Egyptian Olympic hockey player
- Mohamed Mohamed (handballer), Bahraini handball player
- Mohamed Mohamed (footballer) (born 2002), Kenyan association football player

== Others ==
- Azmi Mohamed, the former Lord President of the Federal Court of Malaysia
- Mohamed Elhassan Mohamed (born 1961), Sudanese entrepreneur in the United States
- Mohamed Latiff Mohamed (born 1950), Singaporean Malay poet and writer
- Mohamed Mohamed Atalla (1924–2009), Egyptian-American engineer, physical chemist, cryptographer, inventor and entrepreneur
- Mohamed Mohamed, housemate on Big Brother (British series 9)

== See also ==
- Muhammad (name)
