= Poonacha =

Poonacha is a Kodava surname. Notable people with the surname include:

- Cheppudira Poonacha (born 1965), Indian field hockey player
- C. M. Poonacha (1910–1990), Indian politician
- Harshika Poonacha (born 1993), Indian actress
