= Gamal Mohamed =

Gamal Mohamed may refer to:

- Gamal Fawzi Mohamed, Egyptian field hockey player
- Gamal Mohamed (wrestler) Egyptian freestyle wrestler
