= Kim Gyeong-ae =

Kim Gyeong-ae or Kim Kyŏng-ae (Korean: 김경애), also spelled Kim Kyung-ae or Kim Kyeong-ae, may refer to:

- Gim Gyeong-ae (javelin thrower) (born 1988), South Korean javelin thrower
- Kim Kyeong-ae (sport shooter) (born 1989), South Korean sport shooter
- Kim Kyeong-ae (curler) (born 1994), South Korean curler
- Kim Gyeong-ae (field hockey) (born 1970), South Korean hockey player

== See also ==
- Kim Kyung-ah (born 1977), South Korean table tennis player
