= Sukhjit =

Sukhjit is an Indian given name and surname. Notable people with the name include:

- Sukhjit (died 2024), Punjabi writer
- Sukhjit Kaur Sahi, Indian politician
- Sukhjit Singh
