= Ibrahim El-Masry =

Ibrahim El-Masry may refer to the following Egyptian people:

- Ibrahim El-Masry (footballer)
- Ibrahim El-Masry (handballer)
