= Hussain Hassan =

Hussain Hassan may refer to:

- Hussein Hassan (born 2003), Iraqi footballer
- Hussein Hasan (c. 1850s–1910s), Somali poet
- Hussain Mohamed Hassan (disambiguation), multiple people
