= Serageldin =

Serageldin is a surname. Notable people with the surname include:

- Amer Serageldin (born 1971), Egyptian handball player
- Ismail Serageldin (born 1944), Egyptian academic
- Kareem Serageldin (born 1973), American banker
