= Sukhjit Singh =

Sukhjit Singh may refer to:

- Sukhjit Singh (soldier) (born 1934), former Indian Army officer
- Sukhjit Singh (field hockey) (born 1969), Indian field hockey player
- Sukhjit Singh (cricketer) (born 1996), Indian-born cricketer
- Sukhjit Singh Kaka Lohgarh, politician and former MLA from Dharamkot, Punjab
