= Field hockey at the 1990 Asian Games =

- Venue: Olympic Sports Centre, Beijing
- Dates: 23 September–5 October
- Nations: 9

Field hockey events were contested at the 1990 Asian Games in Olympic Sports Centre, Beijing, China. The men's field hockey tournament was held from 23 September to 5 October 1990 at Olympic Sports Centre, Beijing. The women's field hockey tournament was also played at the same venue, from 24 September to 2 October.

== Medalists ==
Event	Gold	Silver	Bronze
Men	Pakistan; Mansoor Ahmed; Shahbaz Ahmed; Rana Mujahid Ali; Khalid Bashir; Wasim Feroz; Musaddiq Hussain; Muhammad Qamar Ibrahim; Muhammad Irfan; Khawaja Junaid; Shahid Ali Khan; Farhat Hassan Khan; Qazi Mohib; Muhammad Riasat; Anjum Saeed; Zahid Shareef; Tahir Zaman	India; Shakeel Ahmed; Mohammed Ali; Darryl D'Souza; John Fernandes; Mark Patterson; Dhanraj Pillay; Jude Felix Sebastian; Gundeep Singh; Harendra Singh; Jagbir Singh; Jagdev Singh; Pargat Singh; Ram Prakash Singh; Thoiba Singh; Vivek Singh; A. B. Subbaiah	Malaysia; Mohd Abdul Hadi; Charles David Aitken; Enbaraj Kanniah; Gary Fidelis; Kamarudzaman; Lim Chiow Chuan; Soon Mustapha; Mirnawan Nawawi; Shankar Ramu; Sarjit Singh; Brian Jayhan Siva; Sivabalan Selvadurai; Ahmad Suffian; Tai Beng Hai; Nor Saiful Zaini; Ahmad Fadzil Zainal
Women	South Korea; Chang Eun-jung; Cho Kyu-soon; Han Gum-shil; Jin Won-sim; Kim Hyung-soon; Kim Kuk-hee; Kim Kyung-ae; Kim Soon-duk; Kwon Chang-sook; Lee Kyung-hee; Lee Ok-hee; Lee Seon-young; Lim Kye-sook; Ro Young-mi; Son Jeong-im; You Jae-sook	China; Ao Hongmei; Cai Donghong; Chen Jianbin; Chen Mingzhu; Ding Hongping; Fu Bin; Han Wen; Shi Yanhui; Tang Hua; Wang Yanhong; Wen Qi; Wu Yanzhen; Yang Hongbing; Yang Huiping; Ye Jinping; Yu Shuzhen	Japan

== Medal table ==
Rank	Nation	Gold	Silver	Bronze	Total
1	Pakistan	1	0	0	1
1	South Korea	1	0	0	1
3	China	0	1	0	1
3	India	0	1	0	1
5	Japan	0	0	1	1
5	Malaysia	0	0	1	1
Totals (6 entries)		2	2	2	6

== Results ==
=== Men ===
Team	Pld	W	D	L	GF	GA	GD	Pts
Pakistan	6	6	0	0	42	5	+37	12
India	6	5	0	1	22	3	+19	10
Malaysia	6	4	0	2	16	10	+6	8
South Korea	6	3	0	3	14	11	+3	6
China	6	2	0	4	8	15	−7	4
Japan	6	1	0	5	9	21	−12	2
Hong Kong	6	0	0	6	1	47	−46	0

23 September

China	0–3	Malaysia

Olympic Sports Centre, Beijing

23 September

Hong Kong	0–8	South Korea

Olympic Sports Centre, Beijing

23 September

Pakistan	11–1	Japan

Olympic Sports Centre, Beijing

25 September

China	0–4	India

Olympic Sports Centre, Beijing

25 September

Pakistan	4–2	Malaysia

Olympic Sports Centre, Beijing

25 September

Japan	0–2	South Korea

Olympic Sports Centre, Beijing

27 September

Pakistan	5–0	South Korea

Olympic Sports Centre, Beijing

27 September

China	5–0	Hong Kong

Olympic Sports Centre, Beijing

27 September

Malaysia	0–1	India

Olympic Sports Centre, Beijing

29 September

Hong Kong	0–5	Japan

Olympic Sports Centre, Beijing

29 September

India	2–0	South Korea

Olympic Sports Centre, Beijing

29 September

Pakistan	5–0	China

Olympic Sports Centre, Beijing

1 October

South Korea	2–1	China

Olympic Sports Centre, Beijing

1 October

Malaysia	3–2	Japan

Olympic Sports Centre, Beijing

1 October

India	10–0	Hong Kong

Olympic Sports Centre, Beijing

3 October

India	3–0	Japan

Olympic Sports Centre, Beijing

3 October

Pakistan	14–0	Hong Kong

Olympic Sports Centre, Beijing

3 October

South Korea	2–3	Malaysia

Olympic Sports Centre, Beijing

5 October

Malaysia	5–1	Hong Kong

Olympic Sports Centre, Beijing

5 October

Japan	1–2	China

Olympic Sports Centre, Beijing

5 October

Pakistan	3–2	India

Olympic Sports Centre, Beijing

=== Women ===
Team	Pld	W	D	L	GF	GA	GD	Pts
South Korea	5	4	1	0	32	2	+30	9
China	5	4	0	1	20	4	+16	8
Japan	5	3	1	1	17	6	+11	7
India	5	2	0	3	8	10	−2	4
North Korea	5	1	0	4	6	21	−15	2
Singapore	5	0	0	5	0	40	−40	0

24 September

China	6–0	Singapore

Olympic Sports Centre, Beijing

24 September

South Korea	7–0	North Korea

Olympic Sports Centre, Beijing

24 September

Japan	1–0	India

Olympic Sports Centre, Beijing

26 September

China	4–1	Japan

Olympic Sports Centre, Beijing

26 September

India	2–0	North Korea

Olympic Sports Centre, Beijing

26 September

South Korea	16–0	Singapore

Olympic Sports Centre, Beijing

28 September

South Korea	6–1	India

Olympic Sports Centre, Beijing

28 September

Singapore	0–9	Japan

Olympic Sports Centre, Beijing

28 September

North Korea	0–6	China

Olympic Sports Centre, Beijing

30 September

Singapore	0–4	North Korea

Olympic Sports Centre, Beijing

30 September

India	0–3	China

Olympic Sports Centre, Beijing

30 September

South Korea	0–0	Japan

Olympic Sports Centre, Beijing

2 October

Japan	6–2	North Korea

Olympic Sports Centre, Beijing

2 October

India	5–0	Singapore

Olympic Sports Centre, Beijing

2 October

South Korea	3–1	China

Olympic Sports Centre, Beijing
