= Sergey Barabashin =

Soviet hockey player (born 1970)

Personal information
- Nationality: Soviet
- Born: 28 May 1970 (age 55)

Sport
- Sport: Field hockey

Sergey Barabashin (born 28 May 1970) is a Soviet field hockey player. He competed in the men's tournament at the 1992 Summer Olympics.
