= Igor Muladyanov =

Soviet field hockey player

Personal information
- Nationality: Soviet
- Born: 28 May 1971 (age 54)

Sport
- Sport: Field hockey

Igor Muladyanov (born 28 May 1971) is a Soviet field hockey player. He competed in the men's tournament at the 1992 Summer Olympics.
