= Pieter van Ede =

Dutch hockey player

Personal information
- Nationality: Dutch
- Born: 30 November 1965 (age 60) Huizen, Netherlands

Sport
- Sport: Field hockey

Pieter van Ede (born 30 November 1965) is a Dutch former field hockey player. He competed in the men's tournament at the 1992 Summer Olympics.
