= Oleg Khandayev =

Soviet hockey player

Personal information
- Nationality: Soviet
- Born: 9 December 1964 (age 61)

Sport
- Sport: Field hockey

Oleg Khandayev (born 9 December 1964) is a Soviet field hockey player. He competed in the men's tournament at the 1992 Summer Olympics.
