= Harrie Kwinten =

Dutch field hockey player

Personal information
- Nationality: Dutch
- Born: 8 September 1962 (age 63) Eindhoven, Netherlands

Sport
- Sport: Field hockey

Harrie Kwinten (born 8 September 1962) is a Dutch field hockey player. He competed in the men's tournament at the 1992 Summer Olympics.
