= Hussain Mohamed Hassan =

Hussain Mohamed Hassan can refer to:

- Hussain Mohamed Hassan (field hockey) (born 1971), Egyptian field hockey player
- Hussain Mohamed Hassan (judoka) (born 1970), Kuwaiti judoka
