= Son Jeong-im =

South Korean hockey player

Personal information
- Nationality: South Korean
- Born: 12 November 1968 (age 57)

Sport
- Sport: Field hockey
Medal record
Women's field hockey
Representing South Korea
Asian Games
Gold medal – first place	1990 Beijing	Team

Son Jeong-im (born 12 December 1968) is a South Korean former field hockey player. She competed in the women's tournament at the 1992 Summer Olympics.
