= 1991 African Youth Championship =

إنشاء بطولة أفريقيا لكرة القدم للشباب 1991

Tournament details
- Host country: Egypt
- City: Cairo, Alexandria, Ismailia
- Dates: 22 February – 8 March
- Teams: 6
- Venue: 3 (in 3 host cities)

Final positions
- Champions: Egypt (2nd title)
- Runners-up: Ivory Coast
- Third place: Ghana
- Fourth place: Zambia

Tournament statistics
- Matches played: 10
- Goals scored: 19 (1.9 per match)
- Top scorer: (Egypt) Moustafa Sadek (3 goals)

The 1991 African Youth Championship was a football tournament for under-20 players. It was held in Egypt from 22 February until 8 March 1991. The two best teams qualified for the 1991 FIFA World Youth Championship.

== Qualifying ==
=== First round ===
The first leg matches were played on 10–12 August 1990. The second leg matches were held on 24–26 August 1990.

Burkina Faso, Liberia, Congo and Mauritius withdrew: Togo, Ghana, Cameroon and Zimbabwe advanced to the second round, while Algeria, Ghana and Mali received byes.

Central African Republic withdrew after the first leg, with Gabon being awarded a 2-0 victory for the second leg and advancing to the second round.

Guinea were ejected from the competition for using ineligible players.

Team 1	Agg.	Team 2	1st leg	2nd leg
Mauritania	1–3	Morocco	1–2	0–1
Niger	1–2	Tunisia	1–1	0–1
Sierra Leone	1–0	Senegal	1–0	0–0
Benin	1–2	Ivory Coast	0–2	1–0
Guinea	5–0	Gambia	2–0	3–0
Lesotho	0–1	Zambia	0–0	0–1
Central African Republic	1–3	Gabon	1–1	0–2
Ethiopia	(a)4–4	Uganda	2–1	2–3

=== Second round ===
The first leg matches were played on either 27–29 October 1990, and the second leg matches were held on 11 November 1990. The winners advanced to the final tournament in Egypt.

Togo withdrew, meaning Algeria qualified for the final tournament, while Gabon were ejected from the competition for using ineligible players.

Team 1	Agg.	Team 2	1st leg	2nd leg
Morocco	2–4	Tunisia	1–2	1–2
Sierra Leone	3–3(a)	Ivory Coast	3–1	0–2
Mali	0–6	Ghana	0–0	0–6
Zambia	3-4	Gabon	1–1	2–3
Gambia	0–5	Cameroon	0–4	0–1
Zimbabwe	2–4	Ethiopia	1–1	1–3

== Teams ==
Algeria and Tunisia would not participate in the main tournament due to the Gulf War. The following teams qualified for the main tournament:

- Cameroon
- Ivory Coast
- Egypt (host)
- Ethiopia
- Ghana
- Zambia

== Group stage ==
=== Group A ===
Pos	Team	Pld	W	D	L	GF	GA	GD	Pts	Qualification
1	Ivory Coast	2	0	2	0	2	2	0	2 (Note: Tied on head-to-head result, overall goal difference and overall goals scored, final positions were decided by drawing of lots.)	Advance to knockout stage
2	Egypt (H)	2	0	2	0	2	2	0	2	Advance to knockout stage
3	Cameroon	2	0	2	0	2	2	0	2	

Rules for classification: Group tiebreakers
(H) Hosts
Notes:
22 February 1991
15:00

Ivory Coast	1 – 1	Cameroon

Alexandria Stadium, Alexandria

25 February 1991
15:00

Ivory Coast	1 – 1	Egypt

Alexandria Stadium, Alexandria

28 February 1991
15:00

Cameroon	1 – 1	Egypt

Alexandria Stadium, Alexandria

=== Group B ===
Pos	Team	Pld	W	D	L	GF	GA	GD	Pts	Qualification
1	Ghana	2	2	0	0	2	0	+2	6	Advance to knockout stage
2	Zambia	2	1	0	1	3	3	0	3	Advance to knockout stage
3	Ethiopia	2	0	0	2	2	4	−2	0	

Rules for classification: Group tiebreakers
23 February 1991
15:00

Ghana	1 – 0	Zambia

Ismailia Stadium, Ismailia

26 February 1991
15:00

Ghana	1 – 0	Ethiopia

Ismailia Stadium, Ismailia

1 March 1991
15:00

Zambia	3 – 2	Ethiopia

Ismailia Stadium, Ismailia

== Knock-out stage ==
Semifinals
A1	Ivory Coast	0(4)
B2	Zambia (PSO)	0(3)
B1	Ghana	0
A2	Egypt	1

Final
Egypt	2
Ivory Coast	1
Third place
Ghana	2
Zambia	0

=== Semifinals ===
4 March 1991
14:30

Ivory Coast	0- 0 (4-3)(PSO)	Zambia

Alexandria Stadium, Alexandria

5 March 1991
14:30

Ghana	0 - 1	Egypt

Ismailia Stadium, Ismailia

=== Third place ===
8 March 1991
13:00

Ghana	2 - 0	Zambia

Cairo International Stadium, Cairo

=== Final ===
8 March 1991
15:00

Egypt	2 - 1	Ivory Coast
55' Tamer Sakr; 57' Moustafa Sadek		80' (pen.) Mambo Ossou

Cairo International Stadium, Cairo

1991 African Youth Championship winners

Egypt
Second title

== Qualification to World Youth Championship ==
The two best performing teams qualified for the 1991 FIFA World Youth Championship.

- Ivory Coast
- Egypt
