= Viktor Sukhikh =

Soviet hockey player

Personal information
- Nationality: Soviet
- Born: 3 February 1964 (age 62)

Sport
- Sport: Field hockey

Viktor Sukhikh (born 3 February 1964) is a Soviet field hockey player. He competed in the men's tournament at the 1992 Summer Olympics.
