= Tawfik Sakr =

Egyptian footballer (born 1969)

Personal information
- Date of birth: 8 November 1969 (age 56)
- Position: Defender

Senior career*
Years	Team	Apps	(Gls)
- Ghazl El Mahalla SC

International career
- Egypt
- * Club domestic league appearances and goals

Tawfik Sakr (born 8 November 1969) is an Egyptian former footballer. He competed in the men's tournament at the 1992 Summer Olympics.
