= Ashraf Shafik Gindy =

Egyptian field hockey player

Personal information
- Nationality: Egyptian
- Born: 6 October 1967 (age 58)

Sport
- Sport: Field hockey

Ashraf Shafik Gindy (born 6 October 1967) is an Egyptian field hockey player. He competed in the men's tournament at the 1992 Summer Olympics.
