= Suppiah Suria Ghandi =

Malaysian field hockey player (born 1969)

Personal information
- Nationality: Malaysian
- Born: 29 March 1969 (age 57)

Sport
- Sport: Field hockey

Suppiah Suria Ghandi (born 29 March 1969) is a Malaysian field hockey player. He competed in the men's tournament at the 1992 Summer Olympics.
