= Akel Gadallah =

Egyptian footballer (born 1972)

Personal information
- Date of birth: 15 November 1972 (age 53)
- Position: Midfielder

Senior career*
Years	Team	Apps	(Gls)
- Zamalek SC

International career
- Egypt
- * Club domestic league appearances and goals

Akel Gadallah (born 15 November 1972) is an Egyptian former footballer. He competed in the men's tournament at the 1992 Summer Olympics.
