= Gary Fidelis =

Malaysian field hockey player (born 1964)

Personal information
- Full name: Gary Vernon Fidelis
- Nationality: Malaysian
- Born: 17 February 1964 (age 62)

Sport
- Sport: Field hockey
Medal record
Men's field hockey
Representing Malaysia
Asian Games
Bronze medal – third place	1990 Beijing	Team

Gary Fidelis (born 17 February 1964) is a Malaysian field hockey player. He competed in the men's tournament at the 1992 Summer Olympics.
