= Alejandro Doherty =

Argentine field hockey player

Personal information
- Born: August 6, 1965 (age 60)
Medal record
Men's field hockey
Representing Argentina
Pan American Games
Gold medal – first place	1991 Havana	Team
Gold medal – first place	1995 Mar del Plata	Team
Silver medal – second place	1987 Indianapolis	Team

Alejandro L. Doherty Horan (born August 6, 1965) is a former field hockey player from Argentina. He competed for his native country at the 1996 Summer Olympics, where he finished in ninth place with the national squad. He made his Olympic debut at the 1988 Summer Olympics.
