= Khaled El-Kordy =

Egyptian handball player

Khaled El-Kordy (born September 26, 1968) is an Egyptian handball player. He competed for Egypt's national team at the 1992 Summer Olympics.
