= Amro El-Sayed Osman =

Egyptian field hockey player (born 1964)

Personal information
- Nationality: Egyptian
- Born: 11 April 1964 (age 62)

Sport
- Sport: Field hockey

Amro El-Sayed Osman (born 11 April 1964) is an Egyptian field hockey player. He competed in the men's tournament at the 1992 Summer Olympics.
