= Ahmed El-Attar =

Egyptian handball player

Ahmed El-Attar (born April 13, 1967) is an Egyptian handball player. He competed for Egypt's national team at the 1992 and 1996 Summer Olympics.
