= Amro El-Sayed Mohamady =

Egyptian field hockey player (born 1971)

Personal information
- Nationality: Egyptian
- Born: 27 December 1971 (age 54)

Sport
- Sport: Field hockey

Amro El-Sayed Mohamady (born 27 December 1971) is an Egyptian field hockey player. He competed in the men's tournament at the 1992 Summer Olympics.
