= Aser El-Kasaby =

Egyptian handball player

Aser El-Kasaby (born July 31, 1966) is an Egyptian handball player. He competed for Egypt's national team at the 1992 Summer Olympics.
