= National Olympic Sports Centre =

Sports venue in Beijing, China

- 国家奥林匹克体育中心
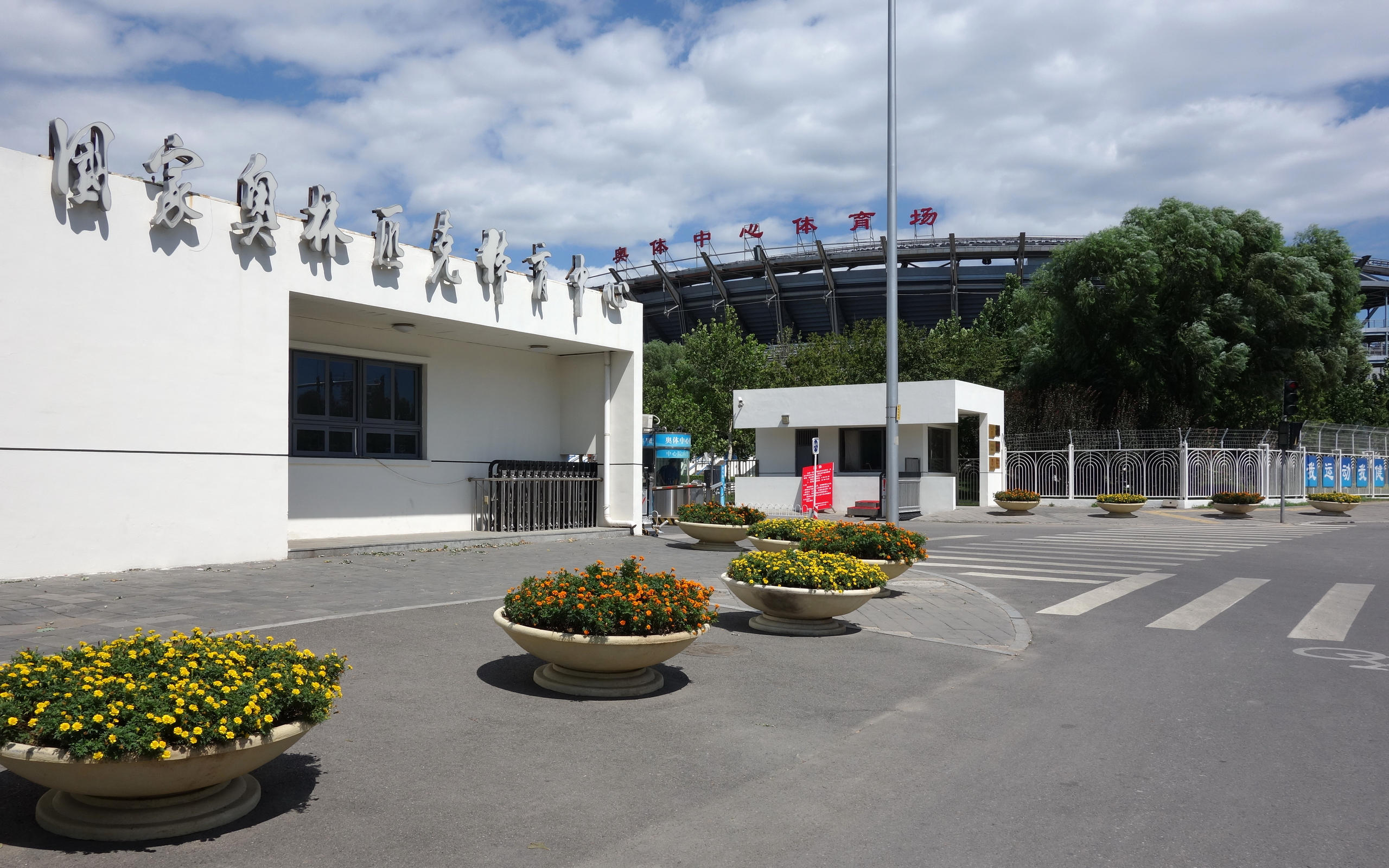

- Location in Beijing
- Location: Chaoyang District, Beijing, China
- Coordinates: 39°58′56″N 116°23′35″E
- Capacity: 36,228

Construction
- Built: 1986
- Opened: 1990

The National Olympic Sports Centre (Chinese: 国家奥林匹克体育中心; pinyin: Guójiā Àolínpǐkè Tǐyù Zhōngxīn) or Olympic Sports Center Stadium (simplified Chinese: 奥体中心体育场; traditional Chinese: 奧體中心體育場; pinyin: Àotǐ Zhōngxīn Tǐyùchǎng) is a multi-purpose stadium in Chaoyang District, Beijing, China. It is currently used mostly for soccer matches. It was constructed in 1986 for the 1990 Asian Games. The complex contains the main stadium, an indoor arena, a hockey field, and a natatorium.

It was renovated to host the 2008 Summer Olympics, where it hosted soccer matches and the running and riding parts of the modern pentathlon events. For the riding discipline, the soccer field at the core of the venue has been turned into a high-standard temporary equestrian field. The renovation also added four pavilion-styled rotating rampways around the stadium.

The stadium has a floor space of 34,975 m^{2} (376,470 sq ft), which exceeds the original building area of 20,000 m^{2} (220,000 sq ft). Its capacity has doubled after the renovation, from about 18,000 to 36,228.

== Transport ==
It is served by Aoti Zhongxin (Olympic Sports Center) station on Line 8 of Beijing Subway.
