= Mohamed El-Sayed Tantawy =

Egyptian hockey player

Personal information
- Nationality: Egyptian
- Born: 21 June 1963 (age 62)

Sport
- Sport: Field hockey

Achievements and titles
- Olympic finals: 1992 Summer Olympics

Mohamed El-Sayed Tantawy (born 21 June 1963) is an Egyptian field hockey player. He competed in the men's tournament at the 1992 Summer Olympics.
