= Mohamed Sallam =

Egyptian footballer and coach (born 1969)

Personal information
- Full name: Mohamed Sallam
- Date of birth: 5 December 1969 (age 56)
- Place of birth: Alexandria, Egypt
- Height: 1.83 m (6 ft 0 in)
- Position: Goalkeeper

Team information
- Current team: Egypt (manager)

Senior career*
Years	Team	Apps	(Gls)
1988–2002	Al-Olympi	?	(?)

International career
1996	Egypt		

Managerial career
- 2010–2013: Smouha (Goalkeeping coach)
- 2013–2014: Egypt (Goalkeeping coach)
- * Club domestic league appearances and goals

Mohamed Sallam (Arabic: محمد سلام; born 5 December 1969) is a former footballer and current goalkeeping coach of Egypt national football team.

== Club career ==
Sallam spent his professional career in the Egyptian Premier League with Al-Olympi.

== International career ==
Mohamed Sallam was a member in Egypt team in 1992 Summer Olympics.
