= Ibrahim El-Masry (footballer) =

Egyptian footballer and sports manager (born 1971)

Personal information
- Full name: Ibrahim Eid Ali Mohamed El-Masry
- Date of birth: 19 August 1971 (age 55)
- Place of birth: Port Said, Egypt
- Height: 1.77 m (5 ft 9 1/2 in)
- Position: Attacking midfielder

Youth career
- Al-Masry

Senior career*
Years	Team	Apps	(Gls)
1988–2003	Al-Masry		
2003–2004	Al-Nasr (Salalah)		

International career
1992–1996	Egypt	13	(2)
- * Club domestic league appearances and goals

Ibrahim El-Masry Arabic: إبراهيم المصري (born 19 August 1971) popularly nicknamed Maradona of Port Said, is a former Egyptian football player and sports manager.

== Career ==
El-Masry played for Al-Masry Club in the Egyptian Premier League. He was the most prominent player in the team during the nineties.

== Clubs ==
- Al-Masry Club (1988-03)
- Al-Nasr (Salalah) (2003–04)

== National teams ==
- Played for Egyptian National Team (1992–1996)
- Played in 1991 FIFA World Youth Championship in Portugal
- Played in 1992 Summer Olympics in Barcelona

== Career statistics ==
=== International ===
Scores and results list Egypt's goal tally first, score column indicates score after each El-Masry goal.

List of international goals scored by Ibrahim El-Masry
No.	Date	Venue	Opponent	Score	Result	Competition
1	2 April 1995	Abbasiyyin Stadium, Damascus, Syria	Syria	2–2	2–2	Friendly
2	14 July 1995	Cairo International Stadium, Cairo, Egypt	Algeria	1–1	1–1	1996 Africa Cup of Nations qualification

== Titles ==
Personal
Best player in 1991 African Youth Championship.

For National Teams
1 title of African Youth Championship 1991
1 title of Arab Cup of Nations 1992

For Al-Masry
1 title of Egyptian Federation Cup 1992
1 title of Egypt Cup 1998

For Al-Nasr (Salalah)
1 title of Oman Professional League 2004
