= Gregory Corbitt =

Australian field hockey player

Medal record

Men's field hockey

Olympic Games
Silver medal – second place	1992 Barcelona	Team

World Cup
Bronze medal – third place	1990 Lahore	
Bronze medal – third place	1994 Sydney	

Champions Trophy
Gold medal – first place	1989 West Berlin	
Gold medal – first place	1993 Kuala Lumpur	
Silver medal – second place	1992 Karachi	

Gregory "Greg" Corbitt (born 2 September 1971 in Perth, Western Australia) is a former Australian field hockey player who played as a striker for the Australian national team. He was a member of the team that won the silver medal at the 1992 Summer Olympics in Barcelona, Spain. Greg was known for his striking abilities. Notably, he was diagnosed with cancer from a urine sample submitted as part of drug screening for Australian National Team athletes and underwent successful surgery to remove a malignant tumor.
