= Greg Russ =

New Zealand field hockey player

Gregory James Russ (born 12 April 1971) is a former New Zealand field hockey player, who finished in eighth position with the men's national team, known as the Black Sticks, at the 1992 Summer Olympics in Barcelona. He was born in Auckland and is the brother of Craig Russ, also an Olympic hockey player for New Zealand.
