= Ehab Moustafa Mansour =

Egyptian field hockey player

Personal information
- Nationality: Egyptian
- Born: 21 October 1968 (age 57)

Sport
- Sport: Field hockey

Ehab Moustafa Mansour (born 21 October 1968) is an Egyptian field hockey player. He competed in the men's tournament at the 1992 Summer Olympics.
