= Yury Safonov =

Soviet hockey player

Personal information
- Nationality: Soviet
- Born: 13 April 1968 (age 58)

Sport
- Sport: Field hockey

Yury Safonov (born 13 April 1968) is a Soviet field hockey player. He competed in the men's tournament at the 1992 Summer Olympics.
