= Pat Caruso =

Canadian field hockey player (born 1963)

Medal record

Men's field hockey

Representing Canada

Pan American Games
Gold medal – first place	1987 Indianapolis	Team
Silver medal – second place	1991 Havana	Team

Pasquale "Pat" Caruso (born June 30, 1963 in Italy) is a former field hockey player.

Caruso participated in two consecutive Summer Olympics for Canada, starting in 1984. After having finished in tenth position in Los Angeles, California, the resident of Calgary, Alberta ended up in eleventh place with the Men's National Team in the Seoul Games.

== International senior competitions ==
- 1984 – Olympic Games, Los Angeles (10th)
- 1988 – Olympic Games, Seoul (11th)
