= Dharma Raj Kanniah =

Malaysian field hockey player (born 1969)

Personal information
- Nationality: Malaysian
- Born: 26 November 1969 (age 56)

Sport
- Sport: Field hockey

Dharma Raj Kanniah (born 16 November 1969) is a Malaysian field hockey player. He competed in the men's tournament at the 1992 Summer Olympics.
