= Alexander Vasilyevich Krasnoyartsev =

Russian pilot and criminal (born 1986)

- Александр Васильевич Красноярцев
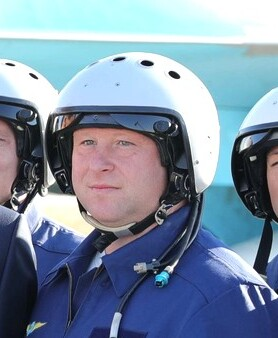
- Photo believed to be of Krasnoyartsev (2017)
- Born: 21 June 1986 (age 40); Orenberg, Russian SFSR, Soviet Union
- Conviction: Killing a civilian (convicted in absentia)
- Penalty: 14 years imprisonment pay two million hryvnia in moral damages
- Military career
- Allegiance: Russia
- Branch: Russian Air Force
- Rank: Major
- Unit: 8689th unit
- Conflicts: Syrian Civil War; Russo-Ukrainian war

Alexander Vasilyevich Krasnoyartsev (Russian: Александр Васильевич Красноярцев; born 21 June 1986) is a Russian military pilot who fought in the Syrian civil war and the Russo-Ukrainian war. He came to prominence after his plane was shot down over Chernihiv and photos of his capture were widely circulated. While attempting to evade capture, he killed a civilian, for which he was later convicted as a war criminal by a local court in Ukraine.

== Military career ==
=== Syria ===
Krasnoyartsev is believed to have seen combat in the Syrian civil war after a picture emerged appearing to show him at Khmeimim Air Base alongside Vladimir Putin and Bashar al-Assad. This has been disputed by Bellingcat.

=== Ukraine ===
Shortly after the start of the Russo-Ukrainian war, on 5 March 2022, he took off from Seshcha and was conducting a bombing raid on Chernihiv when his Sukhoi Su-34 was shot down by the Armed Forces of Ukraine. He and his co-pilot ejected, and he landed on the roof of a private residence where he was spotted by homeowner Vitaliy Serhiyenko. Krasnoyartsev shot Serhiyenko twice with his Makarov pistol, killing him. He was found hiding in a nearby utility room a short time later when he surrendered. His copilot, Konstantin Kryvolapov was found dead at the scene having died as a result of the downing of the plane.

Following his capture, Krasnoyartsev was interrogated by Ukraine, with the interrogation being shared online.

Shortly after his capture, Krasnoyartsev was returned to Russia as part of a prisoner exchange. This was only made public in October, when Ukrainian military leader Kyrylo Budanov stated that five Ukrainian pilots were returned to Ukraine in exchange for Krasnoyartsev.

By 23 April 2022, Ukrainian investigators accused Krasnoyartsev of violating the laws and customs of war under Part 2 of Article 438 of the criminal code. He was found guilty and sentenced in absentia to 14 years imprisonment as well as paying two million hryvnia in moral damages by the Novozavodskyi District Court of Chernihiv in October 2023. An appeal of the conviction was rejected in January 2024.

The exchange of war criminals like Krasnoyartsev has received criticism. Yurii Bilous, a lawyer for Russian war crime victims, claimed that not having to serve a lengthy sentence when captured gave perpetrators a sense of amnesty. Members of the administration, such as deputy Prosecutor General of Ukraine Andrii Leshchenko, have defended these exchanges as it allows more Ukrainian prisoners of war, who would otherwise be subjected to torture and abuse in captivity, to be returned.
