= Hisham Moustafa Korany =

Egyptian field hockey player

Personal information
- Nationality: Egyptian
- Born: 15 October 1960 (age 65)

Sport
- Sport: Field hockey

Hisham Moustafa Korany (born 15 October 1960) is an Egyptian field hockey player. He competed in the men's tournament at the 1992 Summer Olympics.
