= Ahmed Debes =

Egyptian handball player

Ahmed Debes (born January 14, 1970) is an Egyptian handball player. He competed for Egypt's national team at the 1992 Summer Olympics.
