= Ajit Lakra =

Indian field hockey player

Personal information
- Nationality: Indian
- Born: 9 January 1966 (age 60) Pelsera, Bihar, India (now in Jharkhand)

Sport
- Sport: Field hockey

Ajit Lakra (born 9 January 1966) is an Indian field hockey player. He competed in the men's tournament at the 1992 Summer Olympics.
