= Kim Gyeong-ae (field hockey) =

South Korean hockey player

Personal information
- Nationality: South Korean
- Born: 11 August 1970 (age 55)

Sport
- Sport: Field hockey
Medal record
Women's field hockey
Representing South Korea
Asian Games
Gold medal – first place	1990 Beijing	Team

Kim Gyeong-ae (born 11 August 1970) is a South Korean former field hockey player. She competed in the women's tournament at the 1992 Summer Olympics.
