= Wael Fahim Mostafa =

Egyptian hockey player

Personal information
- Nationality: Egyptian
- Born: 9 November 1964 (age 61)

Sport
- Sport: Field hockey

Wael Fahim Mostafa (born 9 November 1964) is an Egyptian field hockey player. He competed in the men's tournament at the 1992 Summer Olympics.
