= Ibrahim Mahmoud Tawfik =

Egyptian field hockey player

Personal information
- Nationality: Egyptian
- Born: 5 September 1965 (age 60)

Sport
- Sport: Field hockey

Ibrahim Mahmoud Tawfik (born 5 September 1965) is an Egyptian field hockey player. He competed in the men's tournament at the 1992 Summer Olympics.
