= Ahmed Belal (handballer) =

Egyptian handball player

Ahmed Belal (born March 12, 1968) is an Egyptian handball player. He competed for Egypt's national team at the 1992, 1996 and 2000 Summer Olympics.
