= Hussain Mohamed Hassan (field hockey) =

Egyptian field hockey player

Personal information
- Nationality: Egyptian
- Born: 25 April 1971 (age 54)

Sport
- Sport: Field hockey

Hussain Mohamed Hassan (born 25 April 1971) is an Egyptian field hockey player. He competed in the men's tournament at the 1992 Summer Olympics.
