= Sukhjit Singh (field hockey) =

Indian hockey player

Personal information
- Nationality: Indian
- Born: 13 November 1969 (age 56)

Sport
- Sport: Field hockey

Sukhjit Singh (born 13 November 1969) is an Indian field hockey player. He competed in the men's tournament at the 1992 Summer Olympics.
