= Moustafa Sadek =

Egyptian footballer (born 1972)

Personal information
- Date of birth: 31 January 1972 (age 54)
- Position: Forward

Senior career*
Years	Team	Apps	(Gls)
- Al Mokawloon Al Arab SC

International career
- Egypt
- * Club domestic league appearances and goals

Moustafa Sadek (Arabic: مُصْطَفَى صَادِق; born 31 January 1972) is an Egyptian former footballer. He competed in the men's tournament at the 1992 Summer Olympics, with Egypt being knocked out in the group stages.
