= Abdel Khlik Abou El-Yazi =

Egyptian field hockey player

Personal information
- Nationality: Egyptian
- Born: 2 March 1966 (age 60)

Sport
- Sport: Field hockey

Abdel Khlik Abou El-Yazi (born 2 March 1966) is an Egyptian field hockey player. He competed in the 1992 Summer Olympics.
