= Aanantha Sambu Mayavo =

Malaysian field hockey player (born 1966)

Personal information
- Nationality: Malaysian
- Born: 18 March 1966 (age 60)

Sport
- Sport: Field hockey

Aanantha Sambu Mayavo (born 18 March 1966) is a Malaysian field hockey player. He competed in the men's tournament at the 1992 Summer Olympics.
