= Amer Serageldin =

Egyptian handball player

Amer Serageldin (born July 1, 1971) is an Egyptian handball player. He competed for Egypt's national team at the 1992 Summer Olympics.
