= Marc Delissen =

Dutch field hockey player

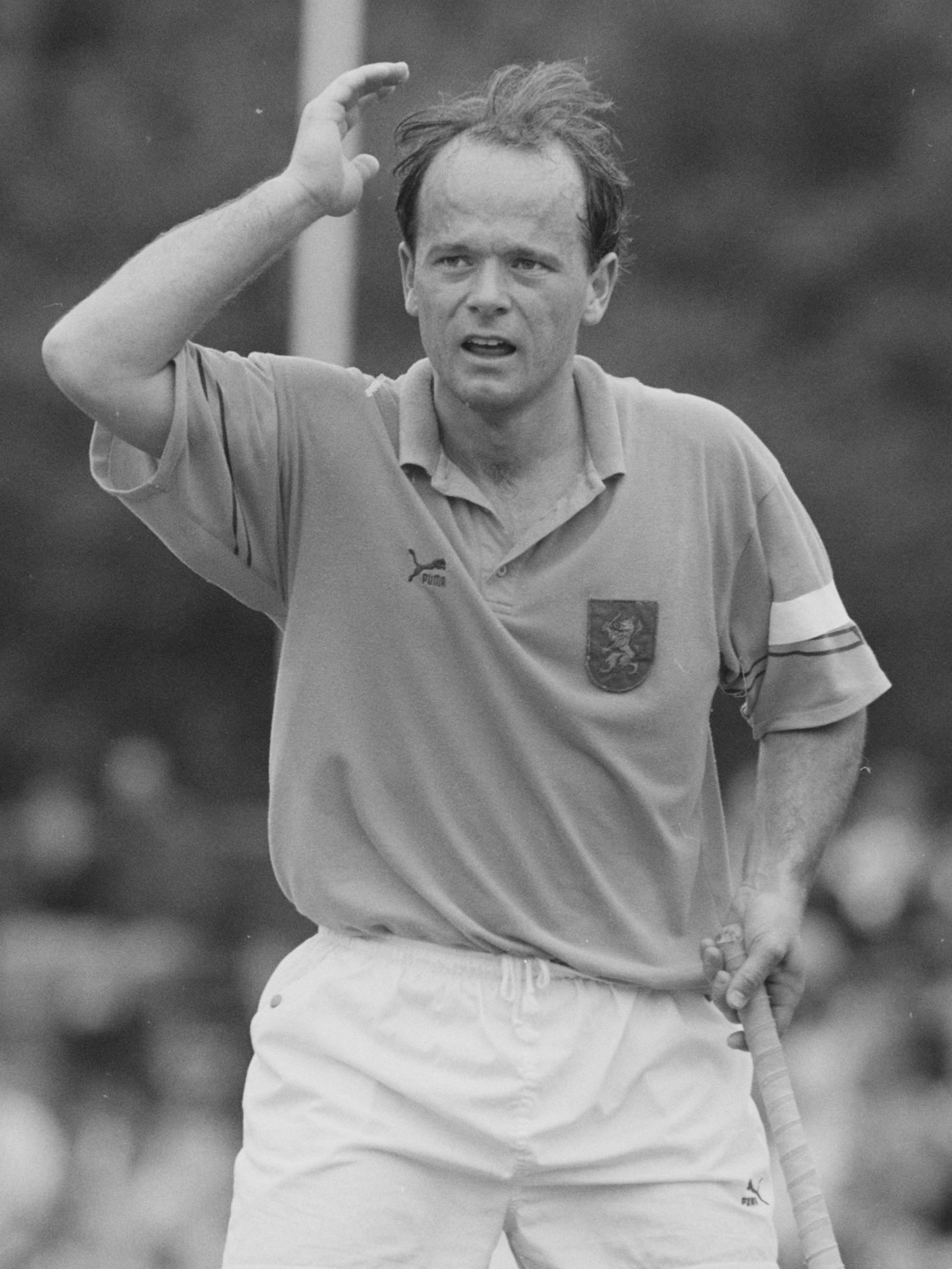
- Delissen with the Dutch national team in 1991

Personal information
- Born: 14 January 1965 (age 61) Amsterdam, North Holland
Medal record
Men's field hockey
Representing the Netherlands
Olympic Games
Gold medal – first place	1996 Atlanta	Team competition
Bronze medal – third place	1988 Seoul	Team competition
World Cup
Gold medal – first place	1990 Lahore	Team competition

Marcus Johannes Elisabeth Leopold "Marc" Delissen (born 14 January 1965) is a former field hockey player for the Netherlands.

Delissen was born in Amsterdam, North Holland. He played 261 international matches for the Netherlands, scored 98 goals and participated in three Olympics. He made his debut when he was nineteen years old, on 21 October 1984, in a friendly match against Ireland in London. With his club HGC from Wassenaar, Delissen became Dutch champion twice, in 1990 and 1996.

He retired after the Atlanta Olympics, but returned for the 2000 Summer Olympics in Sydney, where he assisted head coach Maurits Hendriks and Holland once again became Olympic champions. Delissen later on coached his former club HGC for three years (2002–2005) in the Dutch Premier League, called Hoofdklasse. He is a practising lawyer in The Hague.
