= Mohamed Samir Mohamed =

Egyptian hockey player

Personal information
- Nationality: Egyptian
- Born: 25 January 1971 (age 55)

Sport
- Sport: Field hockey

Mohamed Samir Mohamed (born 25 January 1971) is an Egyptian field hockey player. He competed in the men's tournament at the 1992 Summer Olympics.
