= Pedro Jufresa =

Spanish field hockey player (born 1966)

Personal information
- Full name: Pedro Jufresa Lluch
- Born: 2 May 1966 (age 59); Terrassa, Barcelona, Spain

Pedro Jufresa Lluch (Note: In this Spanish name, the first or paternal surname is Jufresa and the second or maternal family name is Lluch.) (born 2 May 1966) is a Spanish former field hockey player who competed in the 1992 Summer Olympics. He is the brother of Ramón Jufresa.
