= Mohamed Sayed Abdulla =

Egyptian field hockey player

Personal information
- Nationality: Egyptian
- Born: 12 March 1974 (age 52)

Sport
- Sport: Field hockey

Mohamed Sayed Abdulla (born 12 March 1974) is an Egyptian field hockey player. He competed in the 1992 Summer Olympics.
