= Grant McLeod =

New Zealand field hockey player

Donald Grant McLeod (born 9 April 1959 in Whangārei) is a former field hockey player from New Zealand. McLeod, the younger brother of Olympian gold medalist Neil McLeod, followed his brother's footsteps in attending the Olympics with his national team in 1984 and 1992, where they finished seventh and eighth respectively.
