= Cheppudira Poonacha =

Indian field hockey player

Personal information
- Nationality: Indian
- Born: 18 August 1965 (age 60)

Sport
- Sport: Field hockey

Cheppudira Poonacha (born 18 August 1965) is an Indian field hockey player. He competed in the men's tournament at the 1992 Summer Olympics.
