= Gamal Ahmed Abdulla =

Egyptian field hockey player

Personal information
- Nationality: Egyptian
- Born: 24 February 1964 (age 62)

Sport
- Sport: Field hockey

Gamal Ahmed Abdulla (born 24 February 1964) is an Egyptian field hockey player. He competed in the 1992 Summer Olympics.
