= Mohamed Abdel Mohamed =

Egyptian handball player

Personal information
- Nationality: Egyptian
- Born: 14 January 1968 (age 57)

Sport
- Sport: Handball

Mohamed Abdel Mohamed (born 14 January 1968) is an Egyptian handball player. He competed in the 1992 Summer Olympics. He placed 11th for the Egypt team during these games with 1 win and five losses
