= Martín Sordelli =

Argentine field hockey player

Martín Sordelli Cigliano (born 21 January 1969) is an Argentine former field hockey player who competed in the 1988 Summer Olympics and in the 1992 Summer Olympics.
