= Yevgeny Nechayev =

Soviet hockey player

Personal information
- Nationality: Soviet
- Born: 29 October 1967 (age 58)

Sport
- Sport: Field hockey

Yevgeny Nechayev (born 29 October 1967) is a Soviet field hockey player. He competed at the 1988 Summer Olympics and the 1992 Summer Olympics.
