= Lim Chiow Chuan =

Malaysian field hockey player (born 1966)

Personal information
- Nationality: Malaysian
- Born: 24 February 1966 (age 60)

Sport
- Sport: Field hockey
Medal record
Men's field hockey
Representing Malaysia
Asian Games
Bronze medal – third place	1990 Beijing	Team

Lim Chiow Chuan (born 24 February 1966) is a Malaysian field hockey player. He competed at the 1992 Summer Olympics and the 1996 Summer Olympics.
