= Gamal Amin Abdel Ghani =

Egyptian field hockey player (born 1963)

Personal information
- Nationality: Egyptian
- Born: 20 April 1963 (age 62)

Sport
- Sport: Field hockey

Gamal Amin Abdel Ghani (born 20 April 1963) is an Egyptian field hockey player. He competed in the 1992 Summer Olympics.
