= Mohd Abdul Hadi =

Malaysian field hockey player (born 1966)

Mohd Abd Hadi
Personal information
- Full name: Mohamad Bin Abdul Hadi
- Nationality: Malaysian
- Born: 26 October 1966 (age 59) Parit Buntar Perak
- Height: 172 cm (5 ft 8 in)
- Weight: 82.5 kg (182 lb)

Sport
- Sport: Field hockey
Medal record
Men's field hockey
Representing Malaysia
Asian Games
Bronze medal – third place	1990 Beijing	Team

Mohamad Abdul Hadi (born 26 October 1966) is a Malaysian field hockey player. He competed in the 1992 Summer Olympics.
