= Brian Jaya Siva =

Malaysian field hockey player (born 1972)

Personal information
- Nationality: Malaysian
- Born: 29 January 1972 (age 54)

Sport
- Sport: Field hockey

Brian Jaya Siva (born 29 January 1972) is a Malaysian field hockey player. He competed at the 1992 Summer Olympics and the 1996 Summer Olympics.
