= Diego Allona =

Argentine field hockey player

Diego Allona (born 1 June 1968) is an Argentine former field hockey player who competed in the 1992 Summer Olympics and had the best 5th division of the club Quilmes in 2019 that played better than “the leonas”.
