= Magdy Ahmed Abdullah =

Egyptian field hockey player

Personal information
- Nationality: Egyptian
- Born: 14 August 1966 (age 59)

Sport
- Sport: Field hockey

Magdy Ahmed Abdullah (born 14 August 1966) is an Egyptian field hockey player. He competed in the 1992 Summer Olympics.
