= David Freixa =

Spanish field hockey player (born 1967)

David Freixa (born 24 March 1967) is a Spanish former field hockey player who competed in the 1992 Summer Olympics.
