= Mukesh Kumar (field hockey) =

Indian field hockey player

Medal record

Representing India

Men's field hockey

Asian Games
Silver medal – second place	1994 Hiroshima	Team
Gold medal – first place	1998 Bangkok	Team

Nandanoori Mukesh Kumar (born 16 April 1970), also known as Mukesh Kumar Nandanoori, is an Indian field hockey player. He was born in Hyderabad, Andhra Pradesh.

== Career ==
He made his international debut for the Men's National Team in early 1992. Nicknamed Murali, Kumar represented his native country at three consecutive Summer Olympics, starting in 1992 in Barcelona, Spain, where India finished in seventh place. Mukesh represented for India in 307 international matches and scored 80 goals. In the 1992 Barcelona Olympics he scored four goals, in the 1996 Atlanta Olympics he scored two goals, and in the 2000 Sydney Olympics he netted two goals.

== Awards ==
- Arjuna Award - 1995
- Padma Shri - 2003

== Personal life ==
Mukesh Kumar is also married to a hockey player, Nidhi Khullar. They have 2 children, N. Yeshaswini and Ashutosh Kumar.
