= José Antonio Iglesias =

Spanish field hockey player (born 1965)

Personal information
- Full name: José Antonio Iglesias Bilbao
- Born: 16 April 1965 (age 60); Torrelavega, Cantabria, Spain
- Height: 170 cm (5 ft 7 in)
- Weight: 70 kg (154 lb)

José Antonio Iglesias Bilbao (Note: In this Spanish name, the first or paternal surname is Iglesias and the second or maternal family name is Bilbao.) (born 16 April 1965) is a Spanish former field hockey player who competed in the 1988 Summer Olympics and in the 1992 Summer Olympics.
