= Craig Russ =

New Zealand field hockey player

Craig Sinclair Russ (born 10 May 1968) is a former field hockey player from New Zealand, who finished in eighth position with the Men's National Team, nicknamed Black Sticks, at the 1992 Summer Olympics in Barcelona, Spain. He was born in Hamilton, New Zealand. Craig Russ was the hitter in short corners for the New Zealand Black sticks team for a number of years.
