= Igor Yulchiyev =

Soviet field hockey player

Personal information
- Nationality: Soviet
- Born: 13 October 1966 (age 59)

Sport
- Sport: Field hockey

Igor Yulchiyev (born 13 October 1966) is a Soviet field hockey player. He competed at the 1988 Summer Olympics and the 1992 Summer Olympics.
