= Jagbir Singh =

Indian field hockey player

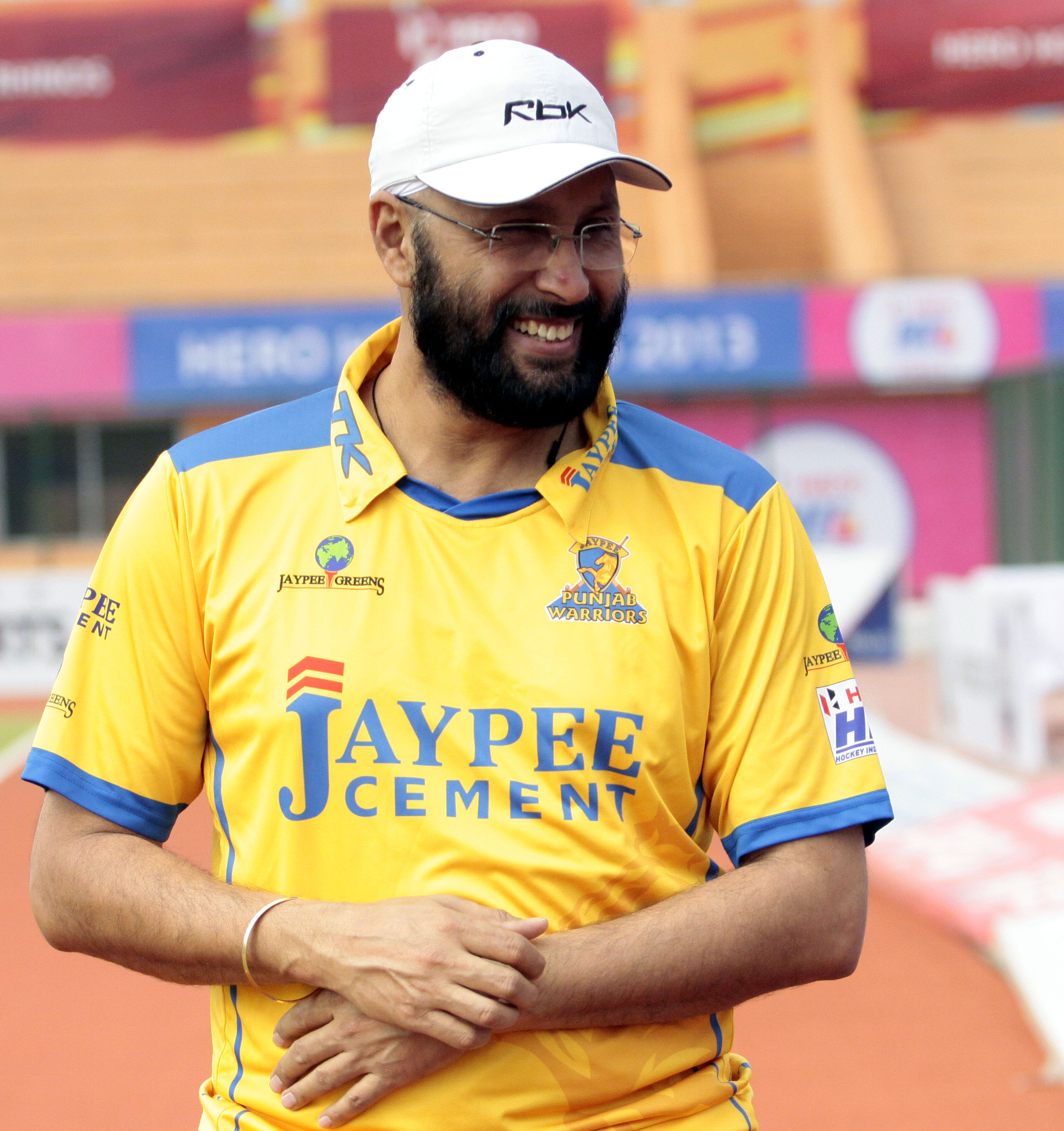
- Singh as coach of Jaypee Punjab Warriors in 2013

Personal information
- Born: 20 February 1965 (age 61) Agra, India

Sport
- Sport: Field hockey
- Position: Centre forward
Senior career
Years	Team	Caps	Goals
–	Air India	-	-
–	HTC Stuttgarter Kickers	-	-
National team
Years	Team	Caps	Goals
1985–1996	India	175	(80+)
Medal record
Representing India
Men's field hockey
Asian Games
Bronze medal – third place	1986 Seoul	Team
Silver medal – second place	1990 Beijing	Team
- Updated on 26 January 2013

Jagbir Singh (born 20 February 1965) is a former Indian field hockey player who played as a centre-forward. He represented India in two Olympics (1988 & 1992), 1990 World Cup and was a leading light of the Indian team in all the major tournaments, for a decade, from 1985 to 1995, including two Asian Games (1986 & 1990), the 1989 Asia Cup & Champions trophy.

He was awarded the Arjuna Award for hockey by the Government of India in 1990, "Laxman Award" in 2004 & highest civilian samman "Yash Bharti Award" for the year 2015–16 by the (Government of Uttar Pradesh). In March 2017, the Ministry of Youth Affairs and Sports, Government of India, appointed him as the national observer for hockey.

== Early life and education ==
Jagbir was born into a Sikh family in Agra in, Uttar Pradesh, his father Darshan Singh also played hockey and organised the all-India Dhyan Chand tournament in the city. He is an alumnus of the Guru Gobind Singh Sports College, Lucknow.

== Career ==
Described as a 'Striking-circle assassin' during his playing days, the fleet-footed sardar also had the honour of representing the All-Star Asia XI which won the '5 Continent World Classic Cup' in Kuala Lumpur in 1990 and played for World XI (Friendly match) in 1993 in Mönchengladbac. The only Indian player so far, to play in Germany for HTC Stuttgart Kickers in the German Hockey Bundesliga 'Premier League from 1992–97.

== Coaching career ==
He was the coach of the Indian men's team in the 2004 Olympics in Athens, Test series against Pakistan/Spain/France and the Champions Trophy held the same year in Lahore. He has attended various FIH coaching seminars and 'Advanced coaching' courses of FIH. FIH appointed him as the Coaching Course Conductor for the Olympic Solidarity Coaching Programme held at Nepal in 2008. He is also the coach for Jaypee Punjab Warriors team in Hockey India League 2013 onwards.

== Media columnist and commentator career ==
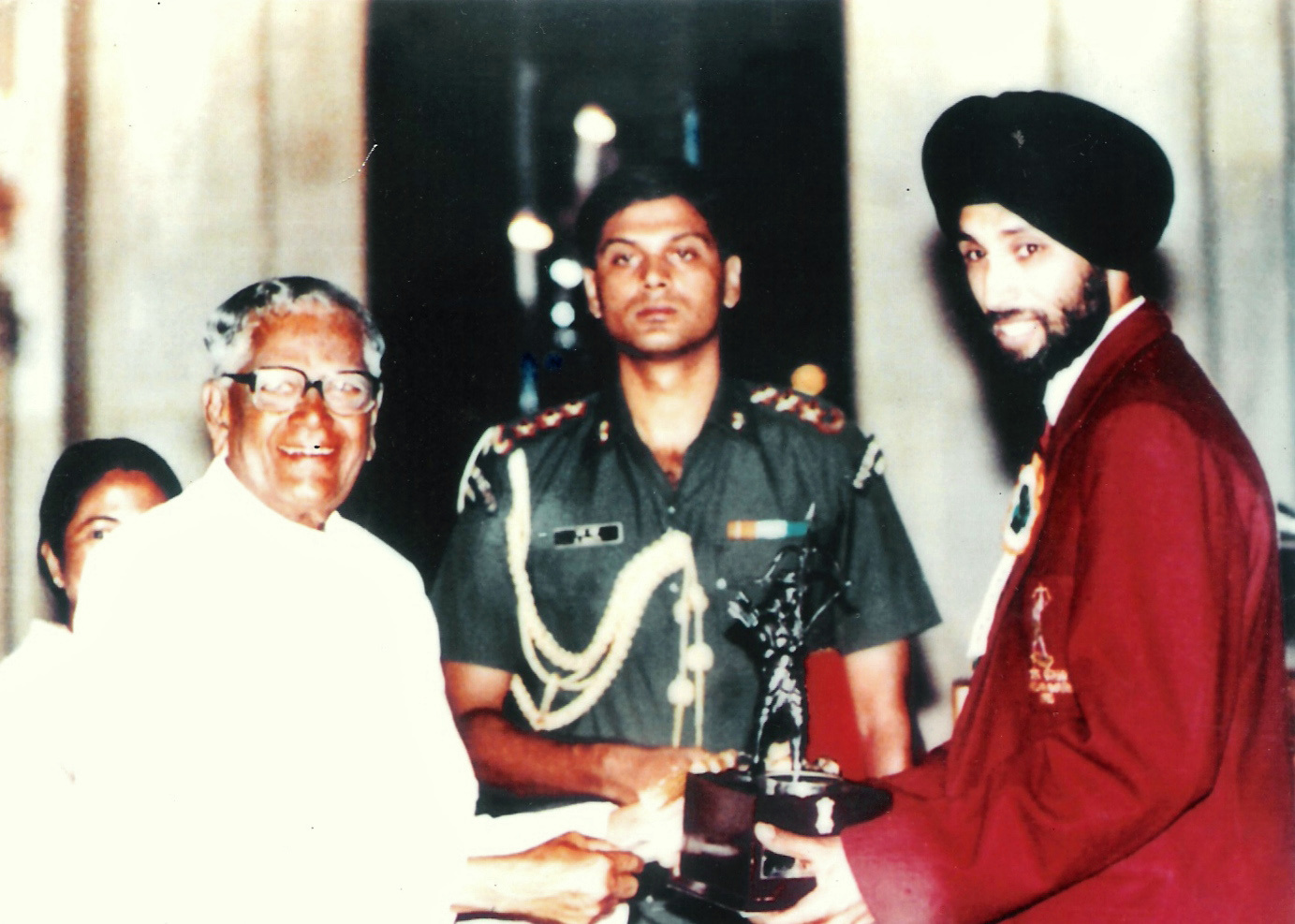
Jagbir Singh receiving the Arjuna Award 1990 from President Venkataraman.

He has been a commentator on TV and a columnist on hockey in national and regional newspapers and magazines in India. He has been part of the commentary and expert analysis team in competitions including the Olympics, World Cup, Commonwealth Games, Asian Games, Asia Cup, and other international and domestic tournaments including ESPN, Ten Sports, Doordarshan, NDTV, Times Now, and CNN IBN.
