= Field hockey at the 1992 Summer Olympics – Men's tournament =

Men's field hockey at the 1992 Summer Olympics
- Olympic field hockey

Tournament details
- Host country: Spain
- City: Barcelona
- Dates: 26 July – 8 August
- Teams: 12 (from 5 confederations)
- Venue: Estadi Olímpic de Terrassa

Final positions
- Champions: Germany (2nd title)
- Runner-up: Australia
- Third place: Pakistan

Tournament statistics
- Matches played: 42
- Goals scored: 203 (4.83 per match)
- Top scorer(s): (Argentina) Fernando Ferrara (Netherlands) Floris Jan Bovelander (11 goals)

The men's field hockey tournament at the 1992 Summer Olympics was the 17th edition of the field hockey event for men at the Summer Olympic Games. It was held over a fourteen-day period beginning on 26 July, and culminating with the medal finals on 8 August. All games were played at the Estadi Olímpic de Terrassa in Terrassa, Spain, located 30 kilometers from Barcelona.

Germany won the gold medal for the second time after defeating Australia 2–1 in the final. Pakistan won the bronze medal by defeating the Netherlands 4–3.

== Qualification ==
Dates	Event	Location	Quotas	Qualifier(s)
—N/a	Hosts	—N/a	1	Spain
18 September – 1 October 1988	1988 Summer Olympics	Seoul, South Korea	1	Great Britain
12–23 February 1990	1990 World Cup	Lahore, Pakistan	1	Netherlands
23 September – 5 October 1990	1990 Asian Games	Beijing, China	1	Pakistan
12–23 June 1991	1991 European Championship	Paris, France	1	Germany
15–23 June 1991	1991 Oceania Qualification Tournament	Various	1	Australia
3–15 August 1991	1991 Pan American Games	Havana, Cuba	1	Argentina
20 September – 1 October 1991	1991 All-Africa Games	Cairo, Egypt	1	Egypt
12–27 October 1991	1991 Olympic Qualification Tournament	Auckland, New Zealand	4	CIS; India; Malaysia; New Zealand
Total			12	

== Umpires ==
- Tarlok Bhullar (IND)
- Santiago Deo (ESP)
- Adriano de Vecchi (ITA)
- Jose Gortazar (ESP)
- M Iqbal Bali (PAK)
- Guillaume Langle (FRA)
- Graham Nash (GBR)
- Don Prior (AUS)
- Alain Renaud (FRA)
- Eduardo Ruiz (ARG)
- Kiyoshi Sana (JPN)
- Claude Seidler (GER)
- Nikolai Stepanov (URS)
- Christopher Todd (GBR)
- Patrick van Beneden (BEL)
- Peter von Reth (NED)
- Alan Waterman (CAN)
- Richard Wolter (GER)

== Preliminary round ==
=== Group A ===
Pos	Team	Pld	W	D	L	GF	GA	GD	Pts	Qualification
1	Australia	5	4	1	0	20	2	+18	9	Semi-finals
2	Germany	5	4	1	0	16	4	+12	9	Semi-finals
3	Great Britain	5	3	0	2	7	10	−3	6	5–8th place semi-finals
4	India	5	2	0	3	4	8	−4	4	5–8th place semi-finals
5	Argentina	5	1	0	4	3	12	−9	2	9–12th place semi-finals
6	Egypt	5	0	0	5	4	18	−14	0	9–12th place semi-finals

Source: FIH

26 July 1992
09:45

Australia	7–0	Argentina
Wansbrough 24', 28', 60'; Lewis 30'; Davies 52', 64'; Stacy 69'	Report

Umpires:
Jose Gortazar (ESP)
Guillaume Langle (FRA)

26 July 1992
16:00

India	0–3	Germany
	Report	Blunck 18'; Fischer 50'; Tewes 62'

Umpires:
Alan Waterman (CAN)
Santiago Deo (ESP)

26 July 1992
17:30

Great Britain	2–0	Egypt
Hill 22', 56'	Report

Umpires:
M Iqbal Bali (PAK)
Adriano de Vecchi (ITA)

28 July 1992
09:45

India	1–0	Argentina
Powar 5'	Report

Umpires:
Nikolai Stepanov (URS)
Adriano de Vecchi (ITA)

28 July 1992
16:00

Australia	5–1	Egypt
Stacy 14'; Bodimeade 22', 70+'; Birmingham 37'; Lewis 45'	Report	Magdy 2'

Umpires:
Peter von Reth (NED)
Santiago Deo (ESP)

28 July 1992
20:00

Germany	2–0	Great Britain
Fischer 16'; Hilgers 30'	Report

Umpires:
Patrick van Beneden (BEL)
Alain Renaud (FRA)

30 July 1992
10:15

Great Britain	3–1	India
Hill 19'; Kerly 60'; Thompson 63'	Report	Sebastian 53'

Umpires:
Peter von Reth (NED)
Jose Gortazar (ESP)

30 July 1992
16:00

Egypt	0–1	Argentina
	Report	Ferrara 54'

Umpires:
Nikolai Stepanov (URS)
M Iqbal Bali (PAK)

30 July 1992
18:00

Australia	1–1	Germany
Davies 22'	Report	Fischer 53'

Umpires:
Kiyoshi Sana (JPN)
Santiago Deo (ESP)

1 August 1992
09:45

Germany	8–2	Egypt
Fischer 10', 14'; Hilgers 19'; Becker 29', 40', 42', 47'; Blunck 38'	Report	A. Gamal 26', 57'

Umpires:
Guillaume Langle (FRA)
Alan Waterman (CAN)

1 August 1992
18:00

Argentina	1–2	Great Britain
Sordelli 60'	Report	Hill 10', 36'

Umpires:
Patrick van Beneden (BEL)
Peter von Reth (NED)

1 August 1992
20:00

Australia	1–0	India
Stacy 3'	Report

Umpires:
Jose Gortazar (ESP)
Adriano de Vecchi (ITA)

3 August 1992
10:15

Great Britain	0–6	Australia
	Report	Birmingham 3', 36'; Stacy 30', 67'; Davies 43', 45'

Umpires:
Alain Renaud (FRA)
Kiyoshi Sana (JPN)

3 August 1992
17:30

India	2–1	Egypt
J. Singh 12'; Nandanoori 21'	Report	F. Gamal 38'

Umpires:
M Iqbal Bali (PAK)
Guillaume Langle (FRA)

3 August 1992
18:00

Germany	2–1	Argentina
Fischer 56'; Hilgers 61'	Report	Ferrara 43'

Umpires:
Jose Gortazar (ESP)
Peter von Reth (NED)

=== Group B ===
Pos	Team	Pld	W	D	L	GF	GA	GD	Pts	Qualification
1	Pakistan	5	5	0	0	20	6	+14	10	Semi-finals
2	Netherlands	5	4	0	1	20	10	+10	8	Semi-finals
3	Spain (H)	5	3	0	2	15	11	+4	6	5–8th place semi-finals
4	New Zealand	5	1	0	4	8	11	−3	2	5–8th place semi-finals
5	CIS	5	1	0	4	11	21	−10	2	9–12th place semi-finals
6	Malaysia	5	1	0	4	9	24	−15	2	9–12th place semi-finals

Source: FIH
(H) Hosts

26 July 1992
10:15

Spain	3–0	New Zealand
P. Jufresa 7'; X. Escudé 19'; I. Escudé 51'	Report

Umpires:
Alain Renaud (FRA)
Graham Nash (GBR)

26 July 1992
18:00

Pakistan	4–1	Malaysia
Bajwa 8', 24'; Khalid 29'; Zaman 41'	Report	Nor 17'

Umpires:
Richard Wolter (GER)
Patrick van Beneden (BEL)

26 July 1992
20:00

Netherlands	5–2	CIS
Bovelander 12', 31', 45', 66'; Weterings 57'	Report	Safanov 38'; Deputatov 69'

Umpires:
Eduardo Ruiz (ARG)
Christopher Todd (GBR)

28 July 1992
10:15

CIS	7–3	Malaysia
Pleshakov 2', 58'; Ioultchiev 30', 48'; Sexenbaev 55', 68'; Netchaev 65'	Report	Nawawi 9'; Lim Chiow Chuan 20'; Nor 35+'

Umpires:
Kiyoshi Sana (JPN)
Graham Nash (GBR)

28 July 1992
17:30

Pakistan	1–0	New Zealand
Bajwa 39'	Report

Umpires:
Claude Seidler (GER)
Eduardo Ruiz (ARG)

28 July 1992
18:00

Spain	2–3	Netherlands
Iglesias 21'; Usoz 60'	Report	Bovelander 12', 49', 59'

Umpires:
Don Prior (AUS)
Tarlok Bhullar (IND)

30 July 1992
09:45

Pakistan	6–2	CIS
Bashir 14', 53'; Hussain 32'; Zaman 48', 59'; Ahmed 54'	Report	Ioultchiev 2', 53'

Umpires:
Alan Waterman (CAN)
Tarlok Bhullar (IND)

30 July 1992
17:30

Netherlands	4–3	New Zealand
Bovelander 29'; Delissen 55'; Weterings 63'; Van den Honert 65'	Report	G. Russ 15'; McLeod 21'; Radovonich 69'

Umpires:
Don Prior (AUS)
Claude Seidler (GER)

30 July 1992
20:00

Spain	5–2	Malaysia
I. Escudé 8', 18'; Iglesias 43', 54', 63'	Report	Abdul 13'; Nor 17'

Umpires:
Richard Wolter (GER)
Christopher Todd (GBR)

1 August 1992
10:15

Netherlands	2–3	Pakistan
Bovelander 15'; Veen 70+'	Report	Bashir 30', 46'; Zaman 43'

Umpires:
Alain Renaud (FRA)
Richard Wolter (GER)

1 August 1992
16:00

New Zealand	2–3	Malaysia
C. Russ 25'; McLeod 57'	Report	Singh 33', 35+'; Nawawi 38'

Umpires:
Kiyoshi Sana (JPN)
Christopher Todd (GBR)

1 August 1992
17:30

Spain	4–0	CIS
X. Escudé 34'; I. Escudé 43', 46', 53'	Report

Umpires:
Claude Seidler (GER)
Eduardo Ruiz (ARG)

3 August 1992
09:45

Netherlands	6–0	Malaysia
Van den Honert 7', 51', 70+'; Delissen 13', 33', 43'	Report

Umpires:
Claude Seidler (GER)
Graham Nash (GBR)

3 August 1992
16:00

CIS	0–3	New Zealand
	Report	Radovonich 39'; G. Russ 60', 64'

Umpires:
Adriano de Vecchi (ITA)
Tarlok Bhullar (IND)

3 August 1992
20:00

Spain	1–6	Pakistan
Iglesias 38'	Report	Zaman 22', 50', 70+'; Shahbaz 45'; Feroz 49', 56'

Umpires:
Christopher Todd (GBR)
Don Prior (AUS)

== Classification round ==
=== Ninth to twelfth place classification ===
9–12th place semi-finals
5 August
Argentina	4
Malaysia	5
5 August
CIS	4
Egypt	2

Ninth place
7 August
Malaysia	4
CIS	3
Eleventh place
7 August
Argentina	7
Egypt	3

==== 9–12th place semi-finals ====
5 August 1992
16:30

Argentina	4–5 (a.e.t.)	Malaysia
Ferrara 49', 64', 76'; Allona 60'	Report	Nawawi 44', 57', 61'; Lim Chiow Chuan 72'; Siva 78'

Umpires:
Tarlok Bhullar (IND)
Claude Seidler (GER)

5 August 1992
19:00

CIS	4–2	Egypt
Ioultchiev 27', 52'; Sexenbaev 28', 60'	Report	Magdy 18', 32'

Umpires:
Christopher Todd (GBR)
Adriano de Vecchi (ITA)

==== 11th place game ====
7 August 1992
09:30

Argentina	7–3	Egypt
Ferrara 5', 13', 21', 24', 49', 52'; Geneyro 26'	Report	Ag. Gamal 32'; Abdulla Magdy 35+', 61'

Umpires:
Richard Wolter (GER)
Don Prior (AUS)

==== Ninth place game ====
7 August 1992
17:30

Malaysia	4–3	CIS
Nawawi 17', 34'; Nor 50'; Sambu 68'	Report	Ioultchiev 11'; Sexenbaev 13', 38'

Umpires:
Jose Gortazar (ESP)
Guillaume Langle (FRA)

=== Fifth to eighth place classification ===
5–8th place semi-finals
5 August
Great Britain	3
New Zealand	2
5 August
Spain	2
India	0

Fifth place
6 August
Great Britain	1
Spain	2
Seventh place
6 August
New Zealand	2
India	3

==== 5–8th place semi-finals ====
5 August 1992
09:15

Great Britain	3–2	New Zealand
Hill 8'; Potter 10'; Batchelor 60'	Report	C. Russ 11'; McLeod 21'

Umpires:
Richard Wolter (GER)
Don Prior (AUS)

5 August 1992
09:45

Spain	2–0	India
Iglesias 40'; Freixa 57'	Report

Umpires:
Graham Nash (GBR)
Alan Waterman (CAN)

==== Seventh place game ====
6 August 1992
17:00

New Zealand	2–3	India
C. Russ 13'; Radovonich 52'	Report	Powar 6'; Kumar 35', 41'

Umpires:
Nikolai Stepanov (CIS)
Peter von Reth (NED)

==== Fifth place game ====
6 August 1992
19:30

Spain	2–1	Great Britain
Escudé 38', 55'	Report	Thompson 66'

Umpires:
Kiyoshi Sana (JPN)
David Waterman (CAN)

== Medal round ==
Semi-finals
5 August
Australia	3
Netherlands	2
5 August
Germany	2
Pakistan	1

Gold medal match
8 August
Australia	1
Germany	2
Bronze medal match
8 August
Netherlands	3
Pakistan	4

=== Semi-finals ===
5 August 1992
17:00

Australia	3–2	Netherlands
Lewis 3'; Bodimeade 25'; Wark 37'	Report	Bovelander 19', 61'

Umpires:
Santiago Deo (ESP)
Patrick van Beneden (BEL)

5 August 1992
20:00

Pakistan	1–2 (a.e.t.)	Germany
Bashir 28'	Report	Fisher 46', 89'

Umpires:
Alain Renaud (FRA)
Eduardo Ruiz (ARG)

=== Bronze medal match ===
8 August 1992
17:00

Netherlands	3–4	Pakistan
Delissen 20'; Veen 22'; Weterings 69'	Report	Shahbaz 55'; Bashir 63', 68'; Ibrahim 67'

Umpires:
Patrick van Beneden (BEL)
Graham Nash (GBR)

=== Gold medal match ===
8 August 1992
19:30

Australia	1–2	Germany
Corbitt 66'	Report	Hilgers 2', 59'

Umpires:
Eduardo Ruiz (ARG)
Santiago Deo (ESP)

== Statistics ==
=== Final standings ===
1. Germany
2. Australia
3. Pakistan
4. Netherlands
5. Spain
6. Great Britain
7. India
8. New Zealand
9. Malaysia
10. CIS
11. Argentina
12. Egypt

=== Goalscorers ===
There were 201 goals scored in 42 matches, for an average of 4.79 goals per match.

11 goals

- (Argentina) Fernando Ferrara
- (Netherlands) Floris Jan Bovelander

8 goals

- (Pakistan) Khalid Bashir

7 goals

- (Commonwealth of Independent States) Igor Ioultchiev
- (Germany) Carsten Fischer
- (Malaysia) Mirnawan Nawawi
- (Pakistan) Tahir Zaman

6 goals

- (Commonwealth of Independent States) Barikhazy Sexenbaev
- (United Kingdom) Rob Hill
- (Spain) Ignacio Escude
- (Spain) José Antonio Iglesias

5 goals

- (Australia) Stephen Davies
- (Australia) Jay Stacy
- (Egypt) Abdulla Magdy
- (Germany) Michael Hilgers
- (Netherlands) Marc Delissen

4 goals

- (Germany) Andreas Becker
- (Malaysia) Nor Saiful Zaini
- (Netherlands) Taco van den Honert
- (Spain) Xavier Escudé

3 goals

- (Australia) Warren Birmingham
- (Australia) Lee Bodimeade
- (Australia) Paul Lewis
- (Australia) David Wansbrough
- (India) Mukesh Kumar
- (Netherlands) Gijs Weterings
- (New Zealand) Grant McLeod
- (New Zealand) John Radovonich
- (New Zealand) Craig Russ
- (New Zealand) Greg Russ
- (Pakistan) Muhammad Asif Bajwa

2 goals

- (Commonwealth of Independent States) Sergei Pleshakov
- (Egypt) Abdulla Gamal
- (Germany) Christian Blunck
- (United Kingdom) Nick Thompson
- (India) Pargat Singh
- (Malaysia) Lim Chiow Chuan
- (Malaysia) Sarjit Singh
- (Netherlands) Stephan Veen
- (Pakistan) Muhammad Shahbaz
- (Pakistan) Wasim Feroze

1 goal

- (Argentina) Diego Allona
- (Argentina) Carlos Geneyro
- (Argentina) Martin Sordelli
- (Australia) Greg Corbitt
- (Australia) Ken Wark
- (Commonwealth of Independent States) Viktor Deputatov
- (Commonwealth of Independent States) Evgueni Netchaev
- (Commonwealth of Independent States) Iouri Safonov
- (Egypt) Abdelgany Gamal
- (Egypt) Fawzi Gamal
- (Germany) Stefan Tewes
- (United Kingdom) Stephen Batchelor
- (United Kingdom) Sean Kerly
- (United Kingdom) Jon Potter
- (India) Jude Felix Sebastian
- (India) Jagbir Singh
- (Malaysia) Mohamad Abdul
- (Malaysia) Aanantha Sambu
- (Malaysia) Brian Siva
- (Pakistan) Shahbaz Ahmed
- (Pakistan) Qamar Ibrahim
- (Pakistan) Musaddiq Hussain
- (Spain) David Freixa
- (Spain) Pedro Jufresa
- (Spain) Pablo Usoz

Source: FIH
