= 2012 World Series Hockey =

Season of an Indian hockey league

Bridgestone World Series Hockey 2012

Tournament details
- Dates: 29 February – 2 April
- Administrator(s): Indian Hockey Federation
- Format(s): Double Round-robin and Knock-out
- Host(s): India
- Venue(s): 8
- Teams: 8

Final positions
- Champions: Sher-e-Punjab (1st title)
- Runner-up: Pune Strykers
- Third Place: Chandigarh Comets; Karnataka Lions

Tournament summary
- Matches played: 59
- Goals scored: 327 (5.54 per match)
- Player of the tournament: Gurjinder Singh (CCO)
- Most goals: Gurjinder Singh (CCO) (19); Syed Imran Warsi (CCH) (19)

2012 World Series Hockey better known as Bridgestone World Series Hockey, abbreviated as Bridgestone WSH, was the first season of the hockey tournament World Series Hockey, a professional league for field hockey in India. The tournament was to take place from 17 December 2011 to 22 January 2012 but later was postponed to 29 February 2012 owing to Olympic qualifiers. Eight teams took part in this competition. The opening ceremony and the first match was held at Sector 42 Stadium, Chandigarh, where Bhopal Badshahs beat Chandigarh Comets 4–3.

The inaugural season of the WSH was won by Sher-e-Punjab by defeating Pune Strykers 5–2 in the final at Mahindra Hockey Stadium, Mumbai and thus became the first champions of WSH. Chandigarh Comets' drag-flicker Gurjinder Singh was named WSH Rockstar (Player of the tournament) (19 goals in 15 matches) who also shared the golden stick with Pakistan's Syed Imran Warsi for 19 goals apiece.

== Venues ==
Following eight venues will host the matches of eight franchises on a home and away basis: Delhi, Mumbai, Pune, Bhopal, Jalandhar, Chandigarh, Bangalore and Chennai will host the matches of eight franchises on a home and away basis.

- Dhyan Chand National Stadium, Delhi
- Bangalore Hockey Stadium, Bangalore
- Mayor Radhakrishnan Stadium, Chennai
- PCMC Hockey Stadium, Shree Shiv Chhatrapati Sports Complex, Pune
- Mahindra Hockey Stadium, Mumbai
- Sector 42 Stadium, Chandigarh
- Surjeet Hockey Stadium, Jalandhar
- Aishbagh Stadium, Bhopal

Originally, nine venues were selected and upgraded with floodlights, replay screens, and scoreboards but organisers decided not to have any matches in Hyderabad's Gachibowli Hockey Stadium.

== Players ==
The players for the eight teams were finalized on 28 November based on the draft system.

Team	Captain	Coach
Bhopal Badshahs	Sameer Dad	Vasudevan Baskaran
Chandigarh Comets	Rehan Butt	Harendra Singh
Chennai Cheetahs	Brent Livermore	José Brasa
Delhi Wizards	Shakeel Abbasi	Roelant Oltmans
Karnataka Lions	Arjun Halappa	Jude Felix
Mumbai Marines	Adrian D'Souza	Andrew Meredith
Pune Strykers	Ken Pereira	Gundeep Singh
Sher-e-Punjab	Prabhjot Singh	Rajinder Singh

== Umpires ==
- Amar Singh Negi (IND)
- A.D. Cariappa (IND)
- A.N. Somaiah (IND)
- Bhupinder Singh (IND)
- Dominic Savio (IND)
- Hardeep Singh Saini (IND)
- Jaspreet Sidhu (IND)
- Lokraju (IND)
- Marc Knülle (GER)
- Parnam Singh (IND)
- Paul Ludwig (AUS)
- Pradeep Kalia (IND)
- R.S. Suryaprakash (IND)
- Satinder Kumar Sharma (IND)
- Scott O'Brian (AUS)
- Shridharan Thamba (IND)
- Stewart Dearing (AUS)

== Exhibition match ==
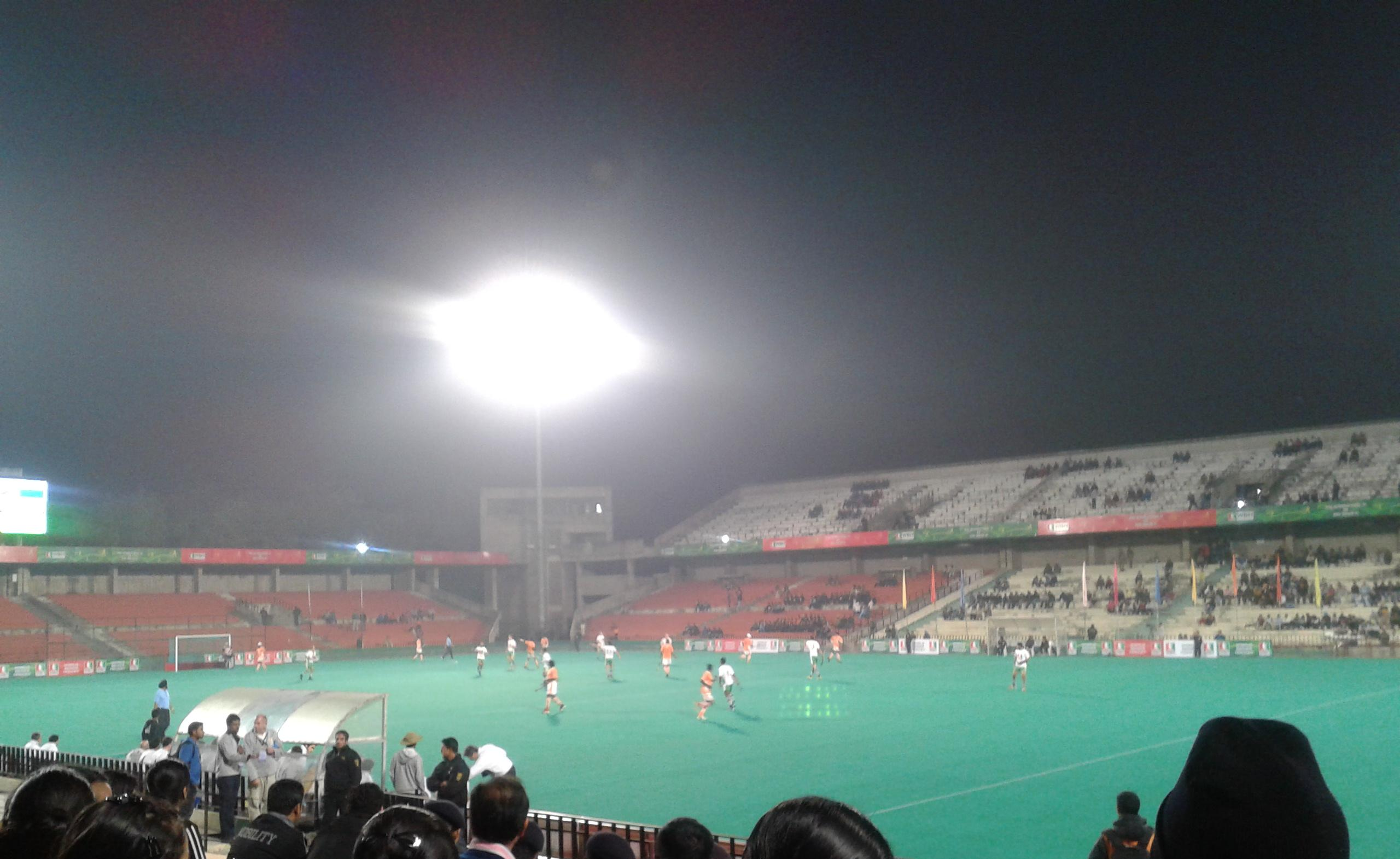
Match between WSH World XI and WSH India XI in progress.

An exhibition match was organised on 20 December at Sector 42 Stadium, Chandigarh. Match was played between WSH World XI and WSH India XI. A one-sided match from the start was won by World XI. The World XI was captained by Brent Livermore and coached by José Brasa and Andrew Meredith. Prabhjot Singh led the India XI and coached by Jude Felix and Harendra Singh.

Match timings according to Indian Standard Time (UTC +05:30)

20 December 2011
19:30

WSH India XI	2–7	WSH World XI
Thakur 17'; Pillay 32'		Reardon 10'; Huber 32'; Grimes 38'; Maguire 40'; Kelly 55', 59'; Seddon 67'

Sector 42 Stadium, Chandigarh

Team Composition

WSH India XI
Player	Position
Bikash Toppo	Forward
Birendra Lakra	Forward
Deepak Thakur	Forward
Dhanraj Pillay	Forward
Inderjit Singh Chadha	Forward
Innocent Kullu	Forward
Lalit Kumar Upadhyay	Forward
Prabhjot Singh (c)	Forward
Sameer Dad	Forward
Ignace Tirkey	Midfielder
Prabodh Tirkey	Midfielder
Tyron Pereira	Midfielder
Vivek Gupta	Midfielder
Diwakar Ram	Defender
Harpal Singh	Defender
Jaswinder Singh	Defender
Samir Baxla	Defender
William Xalco	Defender
Adrian D'Souza	Goalkeeper
Baljeet Singh	Goalkeeper

WSH World XI
Player	Position
Benedikt Sperling	Forward
Chris Seddon	Forward
Connor Grimes	Forward
Eli Matheson	Forward
Peter Kelly	Forward
Roderik Huber	Forward
Steven Faaij	Forward
Sukhwinder Singh Gabbar	Forward
Tariq Aziz	Forward
Adnan Maqsood	Midfielder
Brent Livermore (c)	Midfielder
Casey Henwood	Midfielder
David Seddon	Midfielder
Jiwa Mohan	Midfielder
Joseph Reardon	Midfielder
Lloyd Stephenson	Midfielder
Phelie Maguire	Midfielder
Robert Green	Midfielder
Andrew Eversden	Defender
Jesse Mahieu	Defender
Maik Gunther	Defender
Mathew Phillips	Defender
Melchior Looijen	Defender
Zeeshan Ashraf	Defender
Devesh Chauhan	Goalkeeper

== Opening ceremony ==
Opening ceremony of Bridgestone World Series Hockey was held at Sector 42 Stadium of Chandigarh followed by the inaugural match between Chandigarh Comets and Bhopal Badshahs.

== League progression ==
	League Phase														Knockout	
Team	1	2	3	4	5	6	7	8	9	10	11	12	13	14	SF	F
Bhopal Badshahs	3	3	6	7	10	10	13	13	13	13	14	17	17	17		
Chandigarh Comets	0	0	3	3	6	9	12	12	15	18	19	22	25	28	L	
Chennai Cheetahs	0	3	6	6	7	7	7	10	13	16	16	16	19	19		
Delhi Wizards	3	3	3	6	6	7	7	10	13	13	13	16	16	19		
Karnataka Lions	0	0	0	3	3	6	6	9	9	12	15	18	21	21	L	
Mumbai Marines	0	3	3	6	9	10	10	10	10	10	10	10	10	13		
Pune Strykers	3	6	7	8	9	9	12	12	12	12	15	15	18	21	W	L
Sher-e-Punjab	3	6	7	7	7	10	13	16	19	22	22	25	25	25	W	W
Note: The total points at the end of each group match are listed.									Win			Loss			Draw	
Note: Click on the points (league phase) or W/L (knockout) to see the summary for the match.									Team was eliminated in the league phase.							

== Results ==
All matches' timings according to Indian Standard Time (UTC+05:30)

=== League Phase ===
Team	Pld	W	D	L	GF	GA	GD	Pts
Chandigarh Comets	14	9	1	4	46	34	+12	28
Sher-e-Punjab	14	8	1	5	45	35	+10	25
Karnataka Lions	14	7	0	7	34	40	–6	21
Pune Strykers	14	6	3	5	41	42	–1	21
Delhi Wizards	14	6	1	7	36	37	–1	19
Chennai Cheetahs	14	6	1	7	41	43	–2	19
Bhopal Badshahs	14	5	2	7	32	37	–5	17
Mumbai Marines	14	4	1	9	32	39	–7	13
						Qualified for Semi-Finals		
						Eliminated		

29 February 2012
20:30

Chandigarh Comets	3–4	Bhopal Badshahs
Gurjinder 22', 57'; Jasjit 29'	Report	Baskaran 6', 63'; Geowynne 56'; Yousuf 61'

Sector 42 Stadium, Chandigarh
Umpires:
Satinder Kumar (IND)
Paul Ludwig (AUS)

1 March 2012
19:00

Sher-e-Punjab	5–2	Chennai Cheetahs
Antil 7'; Harpeet 34'; Prabhjot 49', 70'; Gagan Ajit 59'	Report	Warsi 24', 63'

Surjeet Hockey Stadium, Jalandhar
Umpires:
Stewart Dearing (AUS)
Parnam Singh (IND)

1 March 2012
21:00

Mumbai Marines	5–7	Pune Strykers
Sutherland 19'; Sing 27', 29', 43'; Ekka 31'	Report	Almada 4'; Gurpreet 9', 48', 61', 64'; Tsolekile 22'; Damandeep 67'

Mahindra Hockey Stadium, Mumbai
Umpires:
Marc Knülle (GER)
Bhupinder Singh (IND)

2 March 2012
19:00

Delhi Wizards	3–2	Karnataka Lions
Vikramjeet 2'; Abbasi 19'; Rajpal 51'	Report	Jernail 36'; Ravipal 48'

Dhyan Chand National Stadium, Delhi
Umpires:
Satinder Kumar (IND)
R.S. Suryaprakash (IND)

2 March 2012
21:00

Mumbai Marines	1–0	Bhopal Badshahs
Sutherland 25'	Report

Mahindra Hockey Stadium, Mumbai
Umpires:
Shridharan Thamba (IND)
Marc Knülle (GER)

3 March 2012
17:00

Sher-e-Punjab	6–1	Karnataka Lions
Antil 25'; Aziz 29'; Gagan Ajit 31'; Harpal 43'; Harpeet 61'; Prabhjot 66'	Report	Bijwad 19'

Surjeet Hockey Stadium, Jalandhar
Umpires:
Stewart Dearing (AUS)
Amar Singh Negi (IND)

3 March 2012
19:00

Chandigarh Comets	3–5	Chennai Cheetahs
Ramandeep 26'; Butt 36'; Sukhvinder 64'	Report	Warsi 7', 22', 40'; Sinclair 9'; Harris 65'

Sector 42 Stadium, Chandigarh
Umpires:
Paul Ludwig (AUS)
Jaspreet Sidhu (IND)

3 March 2012
21:00

Delhi Wizards	1–3	Pune Strykers
Sunkel 26'	Report	Almada 5'; Gurpreet 53', 59'

Dhyan Chand National Stadium, Delhi
Umpires:
Satinder Kumar (IND)
Pradeep Kalia (IND)

4 March 2012
19:00

Sher-e-Punjab	3–3	Pune Strykers
Thakur 3', 33'; Prabhjot 55'	Report	Gurpreet 45'; Toppo 60', 65'

Surjeet Hockey Stadium, Jalandhar
Umpires:
Parnam Singh (IND)
A.D. Cariappa (IND)

4 March 2012
21:00

Mumbai Marines	2–5	Chandigarh Comets
Sutherland 3'; Joga 7'	Report	Sukhvinder 17', 70'; Gurjinder 24', 46'; Ranjodh 53'

Mahindra Hockey Stadium, Mumbai
Umpires:
Bhupinder Singh (IND)
Dominic Savio (IND)

5 March 2012
19:00

Karnataka Lions	1–3	Bhopal Badshahs
Pillai 41'	Report	Baskaran 43', 45'; Dad 48'

Bangalore Hockey Stadium, Bangalore
Umpires:
Hardeep Singh Saini (IND)
Paul Ludwig (AUS)

5 March 2012
21:00

Delhi Wizards	2–5	Chennai Cheetahs
Sunkel 32', 34'	Report	Reardon 35'; Warsi 47', 53'; Sinclair 55'; Antil 60'

Dhyan Chand National Stadium, Delhi
Umpires:
Lokraju (IND)
Satinder Kumar (IND)

6 March 2012
19:00

Chennai Cheetahs	2–4	Mumbai Marines
Warsi 2'; Yadav 50'	Report	Walkimi 10'; Anthony 23'; Ajmer 41'; Lakra 50'

Mayor Radhakrishnan Stadium, Chennai
Umpires:
Dominic Savio (IND)
Marc Knülle (GER)

6 March 2012
21:00

Karnataka Lions	3–2	Chandigarh Comets
Aiyappa 10', 19', 28'	Report	Chhikara 37', 63'

Bangalore Hockey Stadium, Bangalore
Umpires:
Jaspreet Sidhu (IND)
A.N. Somaiah (IND)

7 March 2012
19:00

Sher-e-Punjab	1–2	Delhi Wizards
Hotchkis 22'	Report	Antil 40'; Gurvinder 63'

Surjeet Hockey Stadium, Jalandhar
Umpires:
Stewart Dearing (AUS)
Amar Singh Negi (IND)

7 March 2012
21:00

Pune Strykers	1–1	Bhopal Badshahs
Gurpreet 25'	Report	Yousuf 66'

PCMC Hockey Stadium, Pune
Umpires:
Pradeep Kalia (IND)
R.S. Suryaprakash (IND)

8 March 2012
19:00

Chandigarh Comets	3–1	Sher-e-Punjab
Gurjinder 2', 65'; Sukhvinder 9'	Report	Hotchkis 59'

Sector 42 Stadium, Chandigarh
Umpires:
Stewart Dearing (AUS)
Pranam Singh (IND)

8 March 2012
21:00

Karnataka Lions	1–2	Mumbai Marines
Aiyappa 16'	Report	Walkimi 45'; Joga 57'

Bangalore Hockey Stadium, Bangalore
Umpires:
Hardeep Singh Saini (IND)
Paul Ludwig (AUS)

9 March 2012
19:00

Chennai Cheetahs	3–3	Pune Strykers
Sinclair 2'; Warsi 30', 44'	Report	Minz 6'; Toppo 35'; Randhawa 64'

Mayor Radhakrishnan Stadium, Chennai
Umpires:
Marc Knüllei (GER)
Bhupinder Singh (IND)

9 March 2012
21:00

Bhopal Badshahs	2–1	Delhi Wizards
Baskaran 14'; Cheeyanna 47'	Report	Vikramjeet 32'

Aishbagh Stadium, Bhopal
Umpires:
Satinder Kumar (IND)
Lokaraju (IND)

10 March 2012
19:00

Chennai Cheetahs	3–5	Karnataka Lions
Warsi 37', 67'; Harris 70'	Report	Ravipal 26', 56', 63'; Bijwad 33'; Deepak 68'

Mayor Radhakrishnan Stadium, Chennai
Umpires:
Marc Knüllei (GER)
Shridharan Thamba (IND)

10 March 2012
21:00

Bhopal Badshahs	2–3	Sher-e-Punjab
Dad 22'; Upadhyay 58'	Report	Thakur 17', 46'; Harpeet 53'

Aishbagh Stadium, Bhopal
Umpires:
Satinder Kumar (IND)
R.S. Suryaprakash (IND)

11 March 2012
19:00

Pune Strykers	1–3	Chandigarh Comets
Almada 11'	Report	Sukhvinder 12'; Gurjinder 38'; Stephenson 50'

PCMC Hockey Stadium, Pune
Umpires:
Paul Ludwig (AUS)
A.N. Somaiah (IND)

11 March 2012
21:00

Mumbai Marines	2–2	Delhi Wizards
Balwanth 11', 66'	Report	Sankai 25'; Abbasi 45'

Mahindra Hockey Stadium, Mumbai
Umpires:
Stewart Dearing (AUS)
A.D. Cariappa (IND)

12 March 2012
19:00

Pune Strykers	3–2	Karnataka Lions
Minz 7'; Tsolekile 46'; Damandeep 54'	Report	Aiyappa 23'; Naveen 47'

PCMC Hockey Stadium, Pune
Umpires:
Paul Ludwig (AUS)
Jaspreet Sidhu (IND)

12 March 2012
21:00

Bhopal Badshahs	3–1	Chennai Cheetahs
Dad 20'; Upadhyay 48'; Henwood 52'	Report	Pillay 22'

Aishbagh Stadium, Bhopal
Umpires:
Satinder Kumar (IND)
Pradeep Kalia (IND)

14 March 2012
19:00

Mumbai Marines	2–3	Sher-e-Punjab
Joga 12'; Walkimi 68'	Report	Aziz 1'; Thakur 56', 63'

Mahindra Hockey Stadium, Mumbai
Umpires:
Parnam Singh (IND)
Amar Singh Negi (IND)

14 March 2012
21:00

Delhi Wizards	0–1	Chandigarh Comets
	Report	Gurjinder 63'

Dhyan Chand National Stadium, Delhi
Umpires:
Scott O'Brian (AUS)
Dominic Savio (IND)

15 March 2012
19:00

Pune Strykers	1–3	Chennai Cheetahs
Minz 35'	Report	Sinclair 9'; Shyam 29'; Warsi 69'

PCMC Hockey Stadium, Pune
Umpires:
Stewart Dearing (AUS)
Jaspreet Sidhu (IND)

15 March 2012
21:00

Delhi Wizards	3–1	Bhopal Badshahs
K Victo 5'; Abbasi 11'; Kanth 70'	Report	Henwood 22'

Dhyan Chand National Stadium, Delhi
Umpires:
Paul Ludwig (AUS)
R.S. Suryaprakash (IND)

16 March 2012
19:00

Sher-e-Punjab	5–2	Chandigarh Comets
Thakur 25', 57', 60'; Vinaya 31'; Harpeet 35'	Report	Sher 56'; Green 70'

Surjeet Hockey Stadium, Jalandhar
Umpires:
Scott O'Brian (AUS)
R.S. Suryaprakash (IND)

16 March 2012
21:00

Mumbai Marines	2–4	Karnataka Lions
Joga 7'; Lakra 63'	Report	Halappa 20', 25'; Naveen 32'; Aiyappa 43'

Mahindra Hockey Stadium, Mumbai
Umpires:
Satinder Kumar (IND)
Parnam Singh (IND)

17 March 2012
19:00

Sher-e-Punjab	4–3	Bhopal Badshahs
Inderjit 35'; Antil 41'; Gagan Ajit 42'; Hotchkis 58'	Report	Henwood 46'; Upadhyay 67'; Bundela 69'

Surjeet Hockey Stadium, Jalandhar
Umpires:
Paul Ludwig (AUS)
Dominic Savio (IND)

17 March 2012
21:00

Karnataka Lions	1–4	Chennai Cheetahs
Bijwad 35'	Report	Pillay 13'; Warsi 33'; Sinclair 42'; Shivamani 57'

Bangalore Hockey Stadium, Bangalore
Umpires:
Stewart Dearing (AUS)
Bhupinder Singh (IND)

19 March 2012
19:00

Chandigarh Comets	4–3	Pune Strykers
Butt 13'; Gurjinder 34'; Sukhvinder 37', 70'	Report	T. Pereira 2'; K. Pereira 6'; Gurpreet 7'

Sector 42 Stadium, Chandigarh
Umpires:
Dominic Savio (IND)
Scott O'Brian (AUS)

19 March 2012
21:00

Delhi Wizards	2–1	Mumbai Marines
Vikramjeet 13'; Abbasi 35'	Report	Ajmer 15'

Dhyan Chand National Stadium, Delhi
Umpires:
Marc Knüllei (GER)
Stewart Dearing (AUS)

20 March 2012
19:00

Chandigarh Comets	3–2	Delhi Wizards
Gurjinder 8', 14'; Khan 44'	Report	Vikramjeet 8'; Abbasi 28'

Sector 42 Stadium, Chandigarh
Umpires:
Paul Ludwig (AUS)
Dominic Savio (IND)

20 March 2012
21:00

Chennai Cheetahs	4–1	Bhopal Badshahs
Warsi 7'; Pillay 53', 67'; Sinclair 62'	Report	Ahmad 3'

Mayor Radhakrishnan Stadium, Chennai
Umpires:
Satinder Kumar (IND)
Stewart Dearing (AUS)

21 March 2012
19:00

Sher-e-Punjab	2–1	Mumbai Marines
Bikramjit 11'; Thakur 56'	Report	Hariprasad 40'

Surjeet Hockey Stadium, Jalandhar
Umpires:
Paul Ludwig (AUS)
Scott O'Brian (AUS)

21 March 2012
21:00

Karnataka Lions	3–2	Pune Strykers
Ravipal 7'; Aiyappa 11'; Radzi 67'	Report	Thimmaiah 15'; Toppo 29'

Bangalore Hockey Stadium, Bangalore
Umpires:
Parnam Singh (IND)
Marc Knüllei (GER)

23 March 2012
19:00

Pune Strykers	4–2	Mumbai Marines
Gurpreet 27'; Almada 33'; Thimmaiah 43', 44'	Report	Xess 15'; Ekka 25'

Shree Shiv Chhatrapati Sports Complex, Pune
Umpires:
Scott O'Brian (AUS)
Bhupinder Singh (IND)

23 March 2012
21:00

Karnataka Lions	2–1	Sher-e-Punjab
Aiyappa 6', 58'	Report	Harpeet 39'

Bangalore Hockey Stadium, Bangalore
Umpires:
Satinder Kumar (IND)
Marc Knüllei (GER)

24 March 2012
19:00

Bhopal Badshahs	4–4	Chandigarh Comets
Yousef 40'; Dad 48'; Bundela 60', 65'	Report	Sukhvinder 8', 20'; Gurjinder 10'; M. Amir 30'

Aishbagh Stadium, Bhopal
Umpires:
Paul Ludwig (AUS)
Jaspreet Sidhu (IND)

24 March 2012
21:00

Karnataka Lions	3–1	Delhi Wizards
Ravipal 10'; Jernail 17'; Aiyappa 65'	Report	Rajpal 51'

Bangalore Hockey Stadium, Bangalore
Umpires:
Stewart Dearing (AUS)
Marc Knüllei (GER)

25 March 2012
19:00

Chennai Cheetahs	2–4	Sher-e-Punjab
Sinclair 7'; Warsi 30'	Report	Bikramjit 12'; Harpeet 21'; Thakur 42'; Gagan Ajit 67'

Mayor Radhakrishnan Stadium, Chennai
Umpires:
Satinder Kumar (IND)
A.D. Cariappa (IND)

25 March 2012
21:00

Bhopal Badshahs	2–1	Mumbai Marines
Yousef 13'; Mudassar 61'	Report	Michael 44'

Aishbagh Stadium, Bhopal
Umpires:
Amar Singh Negi (IND)
Parnam Singh (IND)

26 March 2012
19:00

Chennai Cheetahs	0–3	Chandigarh Comets
	Report	Khan 2'; Gurjinder 9'; Sukhvinder 40'

Mayor Radhakrishnan Stadium, Chennai
Umpires:
Stewart Dearing (AUS)
Hardeep Singh Saini (IND)

26 March 2012
21:00

Pune Strykers	2–6	Delhi Wizards
Almada 2'; Pillay 43'	Report	Pillay 14'; Abbasi 20'; Vikramjeet 25', 39'; K Victo 31', 62'

Shree Shiv Chhatrapati Sports Complex, Pune
Umpires:
Dominic Savio (IND)
Bhupinder Singh (IND)

27 March 2012
19:00

Pune Strykers	3–2	Sher-e-Punjab
Pillay 11'; Gurpreet 28', 30'	Report	Bikramjit 5'; Gagan Ajit 62'

Shree Shiv Chhatrapati Sports Complex, Pune
Umpires:
Dominic Savio (IND)
Marc Knüllei (GER)

27 March 2012
21:00

Bhopal Badshahs	2–5	Karnataka Lions
Ahmad 43'; Baskaran 49'	Report	Halappa 26'; Aiyappa 31', 45', 50'; Naveen 66'

Aishbagh Stadium, Bhopal
Umpires:
Stewart Dearing (AUS)
Amar Singh Negi (IND)

28 March 2012
19:00

Chandigarh Comets	4–3	Mumbai Marines
Ramandeep 4'; Gurjinder 17'; M. A. Khan 32'; Green 68'	Report	Xess 34'; Sutherland 50'; Ajmer 55'

Sector 42 Stadium, Chandigarh
Umpires:
Dominic Savio (IND)
Bhupinder Singh (IND)

28 March 2012
21:00

Chennai Cheetahs	6–4	Delhi Wizards
Raja 14'; Warsi 47', 51'; Sinclair 63', 66'; Pillay 65'	Report	Vikramjeet 11', 27', 38', 68'

Mayor Radhakrishnan Stadium, Chennai

29 March 2012
19:00

Chandigarh Comets	6–1	Karnataka Lions
Gurjinder 33', 56', 62', 67'; Ramandeep 34'; Horo 64'	Report	Sandeep 25'

Sector 42 Stadium, Chandigarh
Umpires:
Bhupinder Singh (IND)
Marc Knüllei (GER)

29 March 2012
21:00

Bhopal Badshahs	4–5	Pune Strykers
Ahmad 5', 50'; Baskaran 9'; Yousef 21'	Report	Thimmaiah 10'; Randhawa 52', 55', 60'; Lakra 68'

Aishbagh Stadium, Bhopal
Umpires:
Parnam Singh (IND)
Jaspreet Sidhu (IND)

30 March 2012
19:00

Delhi Wizards	7–5	Sher-e-Punjab
K Victo 13'; Gupta 28'; Abbasi 37', 42', 60'; Pillay 53'; Rajpal 57'	Report	Gagandeep 8'; Prabhjot 30', 67', 69'; Karamjit 52'

Dhyan Chand National Stadium, Delhi
Umpires:
Paul Ludwig (AUS)
Marc Knüllei (GER)

30 March 2012
21:00

Mumbai Marines	4–1	Chennai Cheetahs
Xess 3'; Ajmer 32'; Sutherland 62'; Ekka 70'	Report	Warsi 65'

Mahindra Hockey Stadium, Mumbai
Umpires:
Stewart Dearing (AUS)
Satinder Kumar (IND)

=== Play-offs ===
Semi-finals
April 1–Bangalore Hockey Stadium, Bangalore
Sher-e-Punjab	4
Karnataka Lions	1
April 1–Mahindra Hockey Stadium, Mumbai
Chandigarh Comets	4 (2)
Pune Strykers (PS)	4 (3)

Final
April 2–Mahindra Hockey Stadium, Mumbai
Sher-e-Punjab	5
Pune Strykers	2

==== Semifinals ====
1 April 2012
19:00

Sher-e-Punjab	4–1	Karnataka Lions
Hotchkis 17'; Karamjit 39'; Harpeet 60'; Prabhjot 68'	Report	Naveen 11'

Bangalore Hockey Stadium, Bangalore
Umpires:
Amar Singh Negi (IND)
Paul Ludwig (AUS)

1 April 2012
21:00

Chandigarh Comets	4–4	Pune Strykers
Gurjinder 4'; Ramandeep 9'; Roy 39'; Butt 41'	Report	Minz 8'; Pereira 46'; Toppo 59'; Randhawa 70'
Penalties
Gurjinder (penalty shoot-out scored); Chhikara (penalty shoot-out scored); Ramandeep (penalty shoot-out missed); Sukhwinder (penalty shoot-out missed); Butt (penalty shoot-out missed)	2–3	(penalty shoot-out missed) Minz; (penalty shoot-out scored) Almada; (penalty shoot-out scored) Toppo; (penalty shoot-out scored) Thimmaiah

Mahindra Hockey Stadium, Mumbai
Umpires:
Dominic Savio (IND)
Stewart Dearing (AUS)

==== Final ====
2 April 2012
21:00

Sher-e-Punjab	5–2	Pune Strykers
Vinaya 6'; Thakur 32'; Prabhjot 47', 67'; Harpeet 57'	Report	Pereira 4'; Randhawa 70'

Mahindra Hockey Stadium, Mumbai
Umpires:
Paul Ludwig (AUS)
Stewart Dearing (AUS)

The final of World Series Hockey was held in front of the capacity crowd at the Mahindra Hockey Stadium, Mumbai. Pune Strykers got into early lead when Tyron Pereira's cross creeped in during the 4th minute of the game. Pune's joy was short-lived as V.S. Vinaya neutralized off their first penalty corner a minute later. Prabhjot Singh and Deepak Thakur led Punjab's attacks and were awarded with couple of penalty corners but could not be converted. Few close shots were saved by the goal-keeper Gurpreet Guri Singh. Attacks on the other end were made by Argentine recruit Mario Almada, Roshan Minz, Nikkin Thimmiah and Bikash Topo. Second quarter seemed like taking a goalless path before Deepak Thakur broke the deadlock between the sides by slotting in off a reverse stick just before the half time and Punjab saw themselves riding on a slender lead (2–1).

The first half saw an evenly contested match but the second half was completely dominated by Punjab. Skipper Prabhjot Singh in the 47th minute gave Punjab a two-goal cushion with a reverse-stick over Pune before the end off the third quarter. Sher-e-Punjab continued the tempo in the 4th quarter with Punjab's penalty-corner specialist Harpeet Singh converted off a penalty corner with a drag-flick. Known as the comeback kings, Strykers' all efforts were prevented by some robust defending by Punjab. A solo effort by the Prabhjot put Punjab into an unassailable 5–1 lead with four minutes left, who added 10th goal to his season's tally, and confirmed that his team as the champions. Simrandeep Randhawa added a consolation goal to Pune's tally by converting a penalty corner in the last minute and the match ended with Sher-e-Jalandhar 5, Pune Strykers 2 making Sher-e-Punjab the winners of the first WSH.

== Awards ==
Rockstar	Superstar	Game Changer	Rookie of the Year	Balkrishan Award
Gurjinder Singh (Chandigarh Comets)	Roshan Minz (Pune Strykers)	Shakeel Abbasi (Delhi Wizards)	Lalit Upadhayay (Bhopal Badshahs)	Rajinder Singh Sr. (Sher-e-Punjab)

== Statistics ==
=== Leading goalscorers ===
Rank	Player	Team	Goals
1	Gurjinder Singh	Chandigarh Comets	19
1	Imran Warsi	Chennai Cheetahs	19
3	Len Aiyappa	Karnataka Lions	13
4	Deepak Thakur	Sher-e-Punjab	12
4	Gurpreet Singh	Pune Strykers	12
4	Vikramjeet Singh	Delhi Wizards	12

=== Hat-tricks ===
Player	For	Against	Result	Report
Joga Singh	Mumbai Marines	Pune Strykers	5–7	Match 3
Gurpreet Singh^{4}	Pune Strykers	Mumbai Marines	7–5	Match 3
Imran Warsi	Chennai Cheetahs	Chandigarh Comets	5–3	Match 7
Len Aiyappa	Karnataka Lions	Chandigarh Comets	3–2	Match 14
Ravipal Singh	Karnataka Lions	Chennai Cheetahs	5–3	Match 21
Deepak Thakur	Sher-e-Punjab	Chandigarh Comets	5–2	Match 31
Len Aiyappa	Karnataka Lions	Bhopal Badshahs	5–2	Match 50
Vikramjeet Singh^{4}	Delhi Wizards	Chennai Cheetahs	4–6	Match 52
Gurjinder Singh^{4}	Chandigarh Comets	Karnataka Lions	6–1	Match 53
Simrandeep Singh	Pune Strykers	Bhopal Badshahs	5–4	Match 54
Shakeel Abbasi	Delhi Wizards	Sher-e-Punjab	7–5	Match 55
Prabhjot Singh	Sher-e-Punjab	Delhi Wizards	5–7	Match 55

^{4} Player scored 4 goals

== See also ==
- World Series Hockey
