= List of World Series Hockey players =

This is a list players signed to play in the World Series Hockey, which was scheduled to commence play on 17 December 2011 but was later postponed to 29 February 2012.

The players for the eight teams will be finalized 28 November based on the draft system.

The draft consisted of 24 Rounds where a team picked one player in each round. Each Team has a minimum of 22 and a maximum of 25 Players (including the Captain) with a maximum of 6 Non-Indian Players, a minimum of 4 local players from their territory and a minimum of 4 Indian Youth Players.

A second draft was held on 10 February 2012. Among the notable picks, Canadian captain Ken Pereira was chosen by Pune Strykers while Australian Mark Harris and Indian Hamza Mujtaba was selected by the Chennai Cheetahs. South African Olympian Clyde Abraham was picked by Mumbai Marines while Gagan Ajit Singh, the Indian striker, will make his comeback into hockey with Sher-e-Punjab.

== International ==
=== Australia ===
- Brent Livermore
- Eli Matheson
- Joseph Reardon
- Mark Harris
- Matthew Hotchkis
- Peter Kelly
- Troy Sutherland

=== Argentina ===
- Juan Martin Lopez
- Lucas Vila
- Matias Vila
- Mario Almada
- Pedro Ibarra
- Rodrigo Vila

=== Brazil ===
- Daniela Barbosa
- Pablo Gomes Navarro

=== Canada ===
- Adam Froese
- Antoni Kindler
- Connor Grimes
- Iain Smythe
- Sukhwinder Singh Gabbar
- Ken Pereira
- Mark Pearson
- Richard Hildred

=== England ===
- Andrew Eversden
- Chris Seddon
- David Seddon
- Mathew Phillips

=== Germany ===
- Benedikt Sperling

=== Ireland (Republic of Ireland) ===
- Phelie Maguire

=== Malaysia ===
- Jiwa Mohan
- Mohammed Bin Mat Radzi

=== Netherlands ===
- Andrew Eversden
- Jesse Mahieu
- Martijn de Jager
- Melchior Looijen
- Roderik Huber
- Steven Faaij

=== New Zealand ===
- Casey Henwood
- Lloyd Stephenson

=== Pakistan ===
- Adnan Maqsood
- Fareed Ahmed
- Rehan Butt
- Shakeel Abbasi
- Syed Imran Warsi
- Tariq Aziz
- Waseem Ahmed
- Zeeshan Ashraf

=== South Africa ===
- Clive Terwin
- Clyde Abrahams
- Geowynne Kyle Gamiet
- Lungile Tsolekile
- Geowynne Kyle Gamiet
- Shanyl Balwanth
- Tommy Hammond

=== South Korea ===
- Sung Min Lee

=== Spain ===
- Alfonso Pombo
- Andreu Enrich

=== United States ===
- Patrick Harris

== India ==
150 Indian players, including all the top players from the current national team have signed on and received advanced payments to play in World Series Hockey. Every player has signed a 3-year contract. Four of these will be captains in the inaugural edition of the tournament. This includes Adrian D'Souza, Arjun Halappa, Prabhjot Singh and Sardar Singh.

- A.B. Cheeyanna
- Abhishek Singh
- Adam Sinclair
- A.D. Cariappa
- Adrian D'Souza
- Affan Yousuf
- Aijub Ekka
- Ajitesh Roy
- Ajmer Singh
- Akashdeep Singh
- Alden D'Souza
- Alvin Alexander
- Amar Aiyamma
- Amardeep Ekka (IOB)
- Amardeep Ekka
- Amit Gowda
- Amit Kumar Prabhakar
- Amol Baban Bhosale
- Anand Tirkey
- Ankit Gulllia
- Anup Antony
- Arjun Antil
- Arjun Halappa
- Armaan Qureshi
- Baljeet Singh
- Baljinder Singh
- Barkat Singh
- Belsajar Horo
- Bharat Chikara
- Bharat Chettri
- Bikash Topo
- Bikramjit Singh
- Bimal Lakra
- Birendra Lakra (Air India)
- Birendra Lakra
- B.K. Muthanna
- Bruno Lugun
- C.S. Khalkho
- Chinthakunta Santosh Kumar
- Conroy Remedios
- Damandeep Singh
- Danish Mujtaba
- Davinderpal Singh
- Deep Mahendrabhai Patel
- Deepak Kullu
- Deepak Thakur
- Devesh Chauhan
- Devinder Singh
- Dhananjay Mahadik
- Dhanraj Pillay
- Dharamvir Singh
- Dinesh Ekka
- Diwakar Ram
- Errol D'Silva
- G.M. Hariprasad
- Gagan Ajit Singh
- Gagandeep Singh
- Ganendrajit Ningombam
- Gaurav Tokhi
- Gauravjeet Singh
- Girish Pimpale
- Gurbaj Singh
- Gurjinder Singh
- Gurpreet Singh
- Gurpreet Singh Guri
- Gurmail Singh
- Gurmeet Singh
- Gursev Singh
- Gurvinder Singh
- Gurvinder Singh Chandi
- Hamza Mujtaba
- Hansraj Jangra
- Harbir Singh
- Harjot Singh
- Harmanpreet Singh
- Harpreet Singh
- Ignace Tirkey
- Imran Khan
- Inderjit Singh
- Innocent Kullu
- Jagdeep Dayal
- Jarnail Singh
- Jasbir Singh
- Jasjit Singh Kular
- Jaspreet Singh
- Jaswinder Singh
- Jay Karan
- John Topno
- K Victo Singh
- Kangujam Chinglensana Singh
- Kangujam Suresh Singh
- Karan Bhaskaran
- Karan Pal Singh
- Karmjit Singh
- Kiesham Roshan
- Kuttappa A.C.
- Lalit Kumar Upadhyay
- Rahul Raj
- Lovedeep Singh
- Mandeep Antil
- Mandeep Singh
- Manjeet Kullu
- Manoj Antil
- Manpreet Pawar
- Manpreet Singh
- Mathias Minz
- Mohd. Amir Khan
- Mohd. Sahir
- Mrinal Choubey
- N. Senthil Kumar
- Nagalingaswamy B
- Narad Bahadur
- Nikkin Thimmaiah CA
- Nitin Kumar
- Nitin Thimmaiah
- Niyaz Rahim Mumtazur Rahim
- P. R. Shreejesh
- PT Rao
- Poonacha MG
- Prabhakar
- Prabhdeep Singh (BPCL)
- Prabhdeep Singh
- Prabhjot Singh
- Prabodh Tirkey
- Pradhan Somanna
- Pramod Kumar
- Preetinder Singh
- Rafeeq SM
- Raghunath VR
- Rajesh Kumar
- Rajpal Singh
- Ramandeep Singh
- Ranjan Lakra
- Ranjodh Singh
- Ravipal
- Roshan Minz
- Rupinderpal Singh
- S Arumugam
- S K Uthappa
- S V Sunil
- Sameer Dad
- Samir Baxla
- Sanawar Ali
- Sandeep Antil
- Sandeep Singh
- Sandeep Singh (IOC)
- Sandeep Singh (Air India)
- Sankalp Raghav
- Sardar Singh
- Sarvanjit Singh
- Satbir Singh
- Shashi Topno
- Sher Singh
- Shivamani
- Shivendra Singh
- Simrandeep Singh
- Simranjeet Singh
- Sudhir Raju Dixit
- Sukhjeet Singh
- Sunil Yadav
- Sunny Samuel
- Tushar Khandekar
- Tyron Pereira
- VS Vinaya
- V.Raja
- Vickram Kanth
- Vikas Sharma
- Vikramjeet Singh
- Vikram Ramkaval Yadav
- Vinayak Bijwad
- Viren Rasquinha
- Vivek Gupta
- William Xalxo
- Yuvraj Walmiki

== See also ==
- Premier Hockey League
- Hockey in India
- Indian National Hockey Team (Men)
- Indian National Hockey Team (Women)
