= List of field hockey venues in India =

This is a list of hockey grounds in India that have been used for major hockey matches.

== Stadiums ==
Name	City	State	Est.	Capacity	Home team	Notes	Image
Aishbagh Stadium	Bhopal	Madhya Pradesh	n/a	10,000	Bhopal Badshahs		
Shree Shiv Chhatrapati Sports Complex	Pune	Maharashtra	1992	11,900			
Bangalore Hockey Stadium	Bangalore	Karnataka	n/a	7,000			
Nathu Barkheda International Hockey Stadium	Bhopal	Madhya Pradesh	2026				
Biju Patnaik Hockey Stadium	Rourkela	Odisha	2010	15,000			
Birsa Munda Hockey Stadium	Ranchi	Jharkhand	n/a	5,000	Ranchi Rays		
Birsa Munda International Hockey Stadium	Rourkela	Odisha	2023	21,800	Odisha Hockey Team	Largest all seated hockey stadium in the world.	
B.R. Yadav International Hockey Stadium	Bilaspur	Chhattisgarh	2019	n/a			
Chandigarh Hockey Stadium	Chandigarh	Chandigarh	1988	30,000	Chandigarh Comets		
G. M. C. Balayogi Athletic Stadium	Hyderabad	Telangana	n/a	8,000			
Kalinga Stadium	Bhubaneswar	Odisha	2010	16,000	Kalinga Lancers		
Khuman Lampak Main Stadium	Imphal	Manipur	1999	8,000			
Kollam International Hockey Stadium	Kollam	Kerala	2014	3,000			
Madurai International Hockey Stadium	Madurai	Tamil Nadu	2025	2,000			
Mahindra Hockey Stadium	Mumbai	Maharashtra	n/a	8,250			
Major Dhyan Chand Hockey Stadium	Lucknow	Uttar Pradesh	n/a	10,000	Uttar Pradesh Wizards		
Major Dhyan Chand Stadium	Jhansi	Uttar Pradesh	1902	5,000			
Major Dhyan Chand National Stadium	New Delhi	Delhi	1933	16,200	Delhi Wave Riders		
Master Chandgiram Sports Stadium	Saifai, Etawah district	Uttar Pradesh	n/a	20,000			
Maulana Md. Tayabullah Hockey Stadium	Guwahati	Assam	2007	2,000			
Mayor Radhakrishnan Hockey Stadium	Chennai	Tamil Nadu	n/a	8,670	Chennai Cheetahs		
Olympian Balbir Singh Senior International Hockey Stadium	Mohali	Punjab	2013	13,648			
PCMC Hockey Stadium	Pimpri	Maharashtra	1993	5,000	Pune Strykers		
Rajgir Hockey Stadium	Rajgir	Bihar	2024	n/a		Bihar First Astro Turf hockey stadium.	
Rajnandgaon International Hockey Stadium	Rajnandgaon	Chhattisgarh	2013	15,000			
Sardar Vallabhbhai Patel International Hockey Stadium	Raipur	Chhattisgarh	2015	4,000			
SDAT Astroturf Hockey Stadium	Kovilpatti	Tamil Nadu	2017	2,000			
Shaheed Bhagat Singh Stadium	Ferozpur	Punjab	1926	10,000			
Shilaroo Hockey Stadium	Shilaroo	Himachal Pradesh	2010	n/a			
Shivaji Hockey Stadium	New Delhi	NCR	1964	5,500			
Surjit Hockey Stadium	Jalandhar	Punjab	2009	7,000	Punjab Warriors		
Tau Devi Lal Athletic Stadium	Panchkula	Haryana	n/a	n/a			
Trichy Hockey Ground	Tiruchirappalli	Tamil Nadu	1970	10,000			
Vidarbha Hockey Association Stadium	Nagpur	Maharashtra	n/a	5,000			

== Proposed Stadiums ==
Name	City	State	Capacity	Tenant	Opening
Dr Bhimrao Ambedkar Hockey Stadium	Faizabad	Uttar Pradesh	n/a	TBA	
Jaypee Sport City Hockey Stadium	Noida	Uttar Pradesh	10,000	TBA	

== See also ==
- List of stadiums in India
- List of cricket grounds in India
- List of international cricket grounds in India
- List of football stadiums in India
- Venues of the 2010 Commonwealth Games
- Lists of stadiums
