= Bhopal Badshahs =

- Full name: Bhopal Badshahs
- Nickname(s): Badshahs
- Founded: 2012
- Dissolved: 2013
- Home ground: Aishbagh Stadium, Bhopal (Capacity 10,000)

Personnel
- Captain: Sameer Dad
- Coach: Vasudevan Bhaskaran
- Owner: Dainik Bhaskar
Home	Away

Bhopal Badshahs (BB) was an Indian professional field hockey team from Bhopal, Madhya Pradesh that competed in the World Series Hockey championship. The captain of the team was Sameer Dad. Bhopal Badshahs was coached by Vasudevan Bhaskaran, who led the national hockey team to victory in the 1980 Summer Olympics in Moscow. Aishbagh Stadium was the home ground of Bhopal Badshahs.

== Sponsors and partners ==
Dainik Bhaskar was the global partner for Bhopal Badshahs.

== Team composition ==
Player	Nationality	Goals
Goalkeepers
Baljeet Singh	India	-
Harmanpreet Singh Jr.	India	-
Strikers
Armaan Qureshi	India	
Ganendrajit Ningombam	India	
Geowynne Kyle Gamiet	South Africa	1
Lalit Kumar Upadhyay	India	3
N. Senthil Kumar	India	
Sameer Dad (captain)	India	4
Shivendra Singh	India	
Tushar Khandekar	India	
Affan Yousuf	India	5
Midfielders
Waseem Ahmed	Pakistan	4
Alfonso Pombo	Spain	
Casey Henwood	New Zealand	3
A. B. Cheeyanna	India	1
Azam Baig	India	
C. Alemada Bopaiah	India	
David Seddon	England	
Girish Ravaji Pimpale	India	
Harmanpreet Singh Sr.	India	
Karan Laxman Bhaskaran	India	7
Mohammad Sahir	India	
Rajesh Kumar	India	
Ranjit Singh	India	
Sardara Singh	India	
Defenders
Ajay Kumar	India	
Andrew Eversden	England	
Baljinder Singh	India	
Cariappa A. D.	India	
Ganendrajit Ningombam	India	
Harbir Singh	India	
Kangujam Suresh Singh	India	
Mudassar Ali Khan	Pakistan	1
Raghunath V. R.	India	
Shailendra Singh Bundela	India	3

== Performance ==
Performance summary
Season	Matches	Won	Drawn	Lost	Win%
2012	14	5	2	7	41.67%

Performance details
Goals for	32 (2.29 per match)
Goals against	37 (2.64 per match)
Most goals	(India) Karan Laxman Bhaskaran (7); Position: 10th

Performance by oppositions
Opposition	Matches	Won	Drawn	Lost	For	Against	Win%
Chandigarh Comets	2	1	1	0	8	7	100.00%
Chennai Cheetahs	2	1	0	1	4	5	50.00%
Delhi Wizards	2	1	0	1	3	4	50.00%
Karnataka Lions	2	1	0	1	5	6	50.00%
Mumbai Marines	2	1	0	1	2	2	50.00%
Pune Strykers	2	0	1	1	5	6	0.00%
Sher-e-Punjab	2	0	0	2	5	7	0.00%

== Fixtures and results ==
=== 2012 ===
No.	Date	Score	Opponent	Venue	Report
1	29 February	4 - 3	Chandigarh Comets	Chandigarh	Match 1
2	2 March	0 - 1	Mumbai Marines	Mumbai	Match 5
3	5 March	3 - 1	Karnataka Lions	Bangalore	Match 11
4	7 March	1 - 1	Pune Strykers	Pune	Match 16
5	9 March	2 - 1	Delhi Wizards	Bhopal	Match 20
6	10 March	2 - 3	Sher-e-Punjab	Bhopal	Match 22
7	12 March	3 - 1	Chennai Cheetahs	Bhopal	Match 26
8	15 March	1 - 3	Delhi Wizards	Delhi	Match 30
9	17 March	3 - 4	Sher-e-Punjab	Jalandhar	Match 33
10	20 March	1 - 4	Chennai Cheetahs	Chennai	Match 38
11	24 March	4 - 4	Chandigarh Comets	Bhopal	Match 43
12	25 March	2 - 1	Mumbai Marines	Bhopal	Match 46
13	27 March	2 - 5	Karnataka Lions	Bhopal	Match 50
14	29 March	4 - 5	Pune Strykers	Bhopal	Match 54
Position in league phase: 7th Failed to qualify for semi-finals
