= Karnataka Lions =

- Full name: Karnataka Lions
- Nickname(s): The Lions
- Founded: 2011
- Home ground: Bangalore Hockey Stadium, Bangalore (Capacity 7,000)

Personnel
- Captain: Arjun Halappa
- Coach: Jude Felix
- Owner: Sporting Ace Pvt. Ltd.
- Website: Official website
Home	Away

Karnataka Lions (abbreviated as KL) was a professional field hockey team based in Bangalore, Karnataka that played in the World Series Hockey. The team was led by Indian hockey player Arjun Halappa and coached by former Indian captain Jude Felix. The team was owned by Sporting Ace Pvt. Ltd. (Zentrum Group). Bangalore Hockey Stadium was the home ground of Karnataka Lions.

Karnataka Lions ended-up as the semi-finalists in the inaugural edition of WSH after being knocked out by Sher-e-Punjab in the semi-final. They finished third in the group stage. Team's penalty corner specialist Len Aiyappa was the top scorer for the team and third overall in the season with 13 goals in 12 matches.

== History ==
=== 2012 season ===
Karnataka Lions had a bad start to the tournament with three consecutive defeats against Delhi Wizards, Sher-e-Punjab and Bhopal Badshahs. Karnataka opened their account against Chandigarh Comets with a 3–1 victory at home. Their next five matches fetched them just two victories and three defeats and were seemed to be out of the tournament as they lied at the bottom of the table. They won four in a row in a must win situation and qualified for the semi-finals. They played Chandigarh Comets in their last league match, where they had a big 6–1 defeat.

Karnataka Lions faced Sher-e-Punjab at their home ground in the semi-final. Karnataka was defeated convincingly despite getting an earlier lead and hence brought their campaign in 2012's season of World Series Hockey to an end. They lost 4–1 from Punjab who went on to the final to become champions. Majority of the team's goals came through their penalty corner specialist Len Aiyappa, including two hat-tricks against Chandigarh Comets and Bhopal Badshahs.

== Franchisee details ==
=== Ownership ===
Logo of Sporting Ace Pvt. Ltd.

Sporting Ace (a part of the Zentrum Group) owned the Karnataka Lions.

=== Sponsors ===
Karnataka Lions have managed to rope in XAGE Mobile as their title & platinum sponsor, Nandi Infrastructure Corridor Enterprises Ltd. (NICE) as the gold sponsor, Slazenger as their equipment partner, Kyazoonga.com as ticketing partners and Radio City as radio partners. Fluid Media, Highlight Advertising, and RVR16 managed the creative duties for the team. Sporting Ace haf in-house managed all the media marketing campaign.

=== Theme song ===
Theme song for Karnataka Lions has been composed by National award winning music director Vidyasagar. Lyrics have been written mainly in Kannada by Shabbir Ahmed.

== Team composition ==
Player	Nationality	Matches	Goals
Goalkeepers
Devesh Chauhan	India	15	-
Jagdeep Dayal	India	12	-
Strikers
Amar Aiyamma	India	2	
Arjun Halappa (captain)	India	12	3
Dhanraj Pillay	India	6	1
Jarnail Singh	India	15	2
Naveen Kumar	India	12	3
Robert Alcantara	Malaysia	7	
S. K. Uthappa	India		
Vinayak Bijwad	India	15	3
Midfielders
Adnan Maqsood	Pakistan	15	
Arjun Antil	India	15	
Deepak Kullu	India	6	1
Gursev Singh	India	13	
Ignace Tirkey	India		
Mohd Rodzhanizam Bin Mat Radzi	Malaysia	8	1
Nagalingaswamy B.	India	4	
Nitin Kumar	India	15	
Ravipal Singh	India	14	6
Sommanna C.K.	India	15	
Defenders
Abhishek Singh	India	12	
Deepak Singh	India	4	
Inocent Kullu	India	12	1
Len Aiyappa	India	12	13
Sandeep Singh	India		
Sandeep Singh (U-18)	India	15	1
Zeeshan Ashraf	Pakistan	14	

== Fixtures and results ==
=== 2012 ===
Goals for	35 (2.33 per match)
Goals against	44 (2.93 per match)
Most goals	(India) Len Aiyappa (13); Position: 3rd

No.	Date	Score	Opponent	Venue	Report
1	2 March	2 - 3	Delhi Wizards	Delhi	Match 4
2	3 March	1 - 6	Sher-e-Punjab	Jalandhar	Match 6
3	5 March	1 - 3	Bhopal Badshahs	Bangalore	Match 11
4	6 March	3 - 2	Chandigarh Comets	Bangalore	Match 14
5	8 March	1 - 2	Mumbai Marines	Bangalore	Match 16
6	10 March	5 - 3	Chennai Cheetahs	Chennai	Match 21
7	12 March	2 - 3	Pune Strykers	Pune	Match 25
8	16 March	4 - 2	Mumbai Marines	Mumbai	Match 32
9	17 March	1 - 4	Chennai Cheetahs	Bangalore	Match 34
10	21 March	3 - 2	Pune Strykers	Bangalore	Match 40
11	23 March	2 - 1	Sher-e-Punjab	Bangalore	Match 42
12	24 March	3 - 1	Delhi Wizards	Bangalore	Match 44
13	27 March	5 - 2	Bhopal Badshahs	Bhopal	Match 50
14	29 March	1 - 6	Chandigarh Comets	Chandigarh	Match 53
15	1 April	1 - 4	Sher-e-Punjab	Bangalore	Semi-final 1
Position in league phase: 3rd Semi-finalists

== Statistics ==
Performance summary
Season	Matches	Won	Drawn	Lost	Win%
2012	15	7	0	8	46.67%
Home	8	4	0	4	50.00%
Away	7	3	0	4	42.86%
Overall	15	7	0	8	46.67%

Performance details
Goals for	35 (2.33 per match)
Goals against	44 (2.93 per match)
Most Goals	(India) Len Aiyappa (13 goals); Current Position: 3rd

Performance by oppositions
Opposition	Matches	Won	Drawn	Lost	For	Against	Win%
Bhopal Badshahs	2	1	0	1	6	5	50.00%
Chandigarh Comets	2	1	0	1	4	8	50.00%
Chennai Cheetahs	2	1	0	1	6	7	50.00%
Delhi Wizards	2	1	0	1	5	4	50.00%
Mumbai Marines	2	1	0	1	5	4	50.00%
Pune Strykers	2	1	0	1	5	5	50.00%
Sher-e-Punjab	3	1	0	2	4	11	33.33%
