= Chandigarh Comets =

Indian professional field hockey team

- Full name: Chandigarh Comets
- Nickname(s): The Comets
- Founded: 2012
- Colors: Blue
- Home ground: Sector 42 Stadium, Chandigarh (Capacity 30,000)

Personnel
- Captain: Rehan Butt
- Coach: Harendra Singh
Home	Away

Chandigarh Comets (CCO) was an Indian professional field hockey team based in Chandigarh that played in World Series Hockey. Pakistani striker Rehan Butt was the captain of the team and Harendra Singh was the coach. Sector 42 Stadium was the home ground of Chandigarh Comets.

Chandigarh Comets were at the top of the table in the league phase but ended up as the semi-finalists of the inaugural edition of WSH. They lost to Pune Strykers in the semi-final 3–4 in the penalty shoot-out. Gurjinder Singh was leading goal scorer for the team who also top-scored in the tournament along with Syed Imran Warsi with 19 goals apiece.

== History ==
=== 2012 season ===
Comets played the inaugural match of the season against Bhopal Badshahs at their home ground where they faced a 4–3 defeat. They continued with a 3–5 loss from Chennai Cheetahs. A 5–2 win over Mumbai Marines fetched them their first victory and first points for the season. With an average start to the season they made a remarkable performance in the later stage. Chandigarh won almost all of their next 10 league matches, though they were held by Bhopal Badshahs 4–4, despite leading by 4 goals to none at one stage. Their only defeat came against Sher-e-Punjab where they lost 5–2. A 4–3 win against Mumbai Marines in their penultimate league stage match got them through to the semi-finals. They ended up as the table toppers after a 6–1 win over Karnataka Lions in their final match.

They faced Pune Strykers in the semi-final at Mahindra Hockey Stadium in Mumbai. Leading the match 4–1 at one stage, they seemed through to the finals before Strykers fought back. A last minute goal by Pune leveled the score 4–4. Misses by the skipper Rehan Butt and Canadian Sukhwinder Singh ended the penalty shoot-out with 3–2 in favour of Pune.

== Team composition ==
Player	Nationality	Matches	Goals
Goalkeepers
Harjot Singh	India	11	-
P. R. Shreejesh	India		-
Swinder Singh	India	6	-
Strikers
Bharat Chikara	India	14	1
Jasjit Singh Kular	India	15	1
Mohammed Amir Khan	India	14	4
Pramod Kumar	India	7	
Ranjodh Singh	India	9	1
Ramandeep Singh	India	13	5
Rehan Butt (captain)	Pakistan	13	3
Sanawar Ali	India	3	
Sarvanjit Singh	India		
Sher Singh	India	15	
Sukhwinder Singh Gabbar	Canada	15	10
Midfielders
Ajitesh Roy	India	13	1
Barkat Singh	India	14	1
Belsajar Horo	India	11	1
Birender Lakra	India		
Gurmeet Singh	India	3	
Jiwa Mohan	Malaysia	14	
Lloyd Stephenson	New Zealand	15	1
Preetinder Singh Sidhu	India	15	
Robert Green	Australia	15	2
Sandeep Singh	India		
Defenders
Gurjinder Singh	India	15	19
Imran Khan	India	6	
Manpreet Singh	India		
Mathew Phillips	England	14	

== Fixtures and results ==
=== 2012 ===
Goals for	50 (3.33 per match)
Goals against	38 (2.53 per match)
Most goals	(India) Gurjinder Singh (19); Position: 1st

No.	Date	Score	Opponent	Venue	Report
1	29 February	3 - 4	Bhopal Badshahs	Chandigarh	Match 1
2	3 March	3 - 5	Chennai Cheetahs	Chandigarh	Match 7
3	4 March	5 - 2	Mumbai Marines	Mumbai	Match 10
4	6 March	2 - 3	Karnataka Lions	Bangalore	Match 14
5	8 March	3 - 1	Sher-e-Punjab	Chandigarh	Match 17
6	11 March	3 - 1	Pune Strykers	Pune	Match 23
7	14 March	1 - 0	Delhi Wizards	Delhi	Match 28
8	16 March	2 - 5	Sher-e-Punjab	Jalandhar	Match 31
9	19 March	4 - 3	Pune Strykers	Chandigarh	Match 35
10	20 March	3 - 2	Delhi Wizards	Chandigarh	Match 37
11	24 March	4 - 4	Bhopal Badshahs	Bhopal	Match 43
12	26 March	3 - 0	Chennai Cheetahs	Chennai	Match 47
13	28 March	4 - 3	Mumbai Marines	Chandigarh	Match 51
14	29 March	6 - 1	Karnataka Lions	Chandigarh	Match 53
15	1 April	2 - 3 (PS); 4 - 4 (FT)	Pune Strykers	Mumbai	Semi-final 2
Position in league phase: 1st Semi-finalists

== Statistics ==
Performance summary
Season	Matches	Won	Drawn	Lost	Win%
2012	15	9	1	5	60.00%
Home	7	5	0	2	71.43%
Away	8	4	1	3	50.00%
Overall	15	9	1	5	60.00%

Performance details
Goals for	50 (3.33 per match)
Goals against	38 (2.53 per match)
Most goals	(India) Gurjinder Singh (19); Position: 1st

Performance by Oppositions
Opposition	Matches	Won	Drawn	Lost	For	Against	Win%
Bhopal Badshahs	2	0	1	1	7	8	0.00%
Chennai Cheetahs	2	1	0	1	6	5	50.00%
Delhi Wizards	2	2	0	0	4	2	100.00%
Karnataka Lions	2	1	0	1	8	4	50.00%
Mumbai Marines	2	2	0	0	9	5	100.00%
Pune Strykers	3	2	0	1	11	8	66.67%
Sher-e-Punjab	2	1	0	1	5	6	50.00%

=== Hat-tricks ===
No.	Player	Opposition	Result	Season	Venue	Report
1	(India) Gurjinder Singh^{4}	Karnataka Lions	6 – 1	2012	Chandigarh – Sector 42 Stadium	29 March 2012

^{4} Player scored 4 goals
