= Delhi Wizards =

Indian professional field hockey team

- Full name: Delhi Wizards
- Nickname(s): Wizards
- Founded: 2011
- Home ground: Dhyan Chand National Stadium, Delhi (Capacity 18,000)

Personnel
- Captain: Shakeel Abbasi
- Coach: Roelant Oltmans
- Owner: Wizcraft International
- Manager: Atin Saini
Home	Away

Delhi Wizards (DW) was an Indian professional field hockey team based in Delhi that played in World Series Hockey. Its captain was the Pakistani stryker Shakeel Abbasi. The team was owned by Wizcraft International and coached by Roelant Oltmans and Darryl Dsouza. Dhyan Chand National Stadium was the home ground of Delhi Wizards.

== Ownership ==
Wizcraft International acquired the Delhi franchise of World Series Hockey. Wizcraft has been instrumental in shaping the event management and brand activation industry in India.

== Team composition ==
Player	Nationality	Goals
Goalkeepers
Kamaldeep Singh	India	-
Mrinal Choubey	India	-
Strikers
Bruno Lugun	India	
Gurvinder Singh	India	1
K. Victo Singh	India	4
Manoj Antil	India	1
Philip Sunkel	Germany	3
Rajpal Singh	India	3
Rodrigo Vila	Argentina	
Shakeel Abbasi	Pakistan	8
Upendra Pillay	India	1
Midfielders
Anand Tirkey	India	
Gurbaj Singh	India	
Martijn de Jager	Netherlands	
Matias Minz	India	
Patrick Harris	United States	
Vickram Kanth	India	1
Vivek Gupta	India	2
Jaswinder Singh	India	
Defenders
C. S. Khalko	India	
Jaswinder Singh	India	
Keisham Roshan	India	
Lovedeep Singh	India	
Manjeet Kullu	India	
Rupinder Pal Singh	India	
Vikramjeet Singh	India	12

== Fixtures and results ==
=== 2012 ===
Goals for	36 (2.57 per match)
Goals against	37 (2.64 per match)
Most goals	(India) Vikramjeet Singh (12); Position: 4th

No.	Date	Score	Opponent	Venue	Report
1	2 March	3 - 2	Karnataka Lions	Delhi	Match 4
2	3 March	1 - 3	Pune Strykers	Delhi	Match 8
3	5 March	2 - 5	Chennai Cheetahs	Delhi	Match 12
4	7 March	2 - 1	Sher-e-Punjab	Jalandhar	Match 15
5	9 March	1 - 2	Bhopal Badshahs	Bhopal	Match 20
6	11 March	2 - 2	Mumbai Marines	Mumbai	Match 24
7	14 March	0 - 1	Chandigarh Comets	Delhi	Match 28
8	15 March	3 - 1	Bhopal Badshahs	Delhi	Match 30
9	19 March	2 - 1	Mumbai Marines	Delhi	Match 36
10	20 March	2 - 3	Chandigarh Comets	Chandigarh	Match 37
11	24 March	1 - 3	Karnataka Lions	Bangalore	Match 44
12	26 March	6 - 2	Pune Strykers	Pune	Match 48
13	28 March	4 - 6	Chennai Cheetahs	Chennai	Match 52
14	30 March	7 - 5	Sher-e-Punjab	Delhi	Match 55
Position in league phase: 5th Failed to qualify for semi-finals

== Statistics ==
Performance summary
Season	Matches	Won	Drawn	Lost	Win%
2012	14	6	1	7	42.86%
Home	7	4	0	3	57.14%
Away	7	2	1	4	28.57%
Overall	14	6	1	7	42.86%

Performance details
Goals for	36 (2.57 per match)
Goals against	37 (2.64 per match)
Most goals	(India) Vikramjeet Singh (12); Position: 4th

Performance by oppositions
Opposition	Matches	Won	Drawn	Lost	For	Against	Win%
Bhopal Badshahs	2	1	0	1	4	3	50.00%
Chandigarh Comets	2	0	0	2	2	4	0.00%
Chennai Cheetahs	2	0	0	2	6	11	0.00%
Karnataka Lions	2	1	0	1	4	5	50.00%
Mumbai Marines	2	1	1	0	4	3	50.00%
Pune Strykers	2	1	0	1	7	5	50.00%
Sher-e-Punjab	2	2	0	0	9	6	100.00%
