= Sher-e-Punjab (field hockey team) =

Field hockey team

- Full name: Sher-e-Punjab
- Nickname(s): Shers
- Founded: 2012
- Home ground: Surjit Hockey Stadium, Jalandhar (Capacity 7,000)

Personnel
- Captain: Prabhjot Singh
- Coach: Rajinder Singh
Home	Away

Sher-e-Punjab (abbreviated as SP) (Punjabi: ਸ਼ੇਰ-ਏ-ਪੰਜਾਬ) was an Indian professional field hockey team named after Sher-e-Punjab and based in Jalandhar, Punjab that played in World Series Hockey. The team was led by Indian forward Prabhjot Singh and coached by former Indian coach Rajinder Singh. Surjeet Hockey Stadium in Jalandhar served as the home ground of Sher-e-Punjab.

Sher-e-Punjab became the champions of the inaugural edition of WSH by defeating Pune Strykers 5–2 in the final. Deepak Thakur has scored most goals for the team.

== History ==
=== 2012 season ===
Sher-e-Punjab begun their campaign with a 5–2 victory over Chennai Cheetahs at home. After being undefeated for three matches, they lost consecutive matches to Delhi Wizards and Chandigarh Comets, 1–2 and 1–3 respectively. They were the first team to qualify for the playoffs. They defeated Bhopal Badshahs and Mumbai Marines both home and away. The team led the points table almost throughout the league phase due to their consistent performance. However, just one win in last four matches resulted in a number two finish at the end of league phase, trailing Chandigarh Comets by three points.

Sher-e-Punjab faced Karnataka Lions (who finished number three in the league phase) in the semi-final. They conceded an early goal but went on to thrash the hosts 4–1 to enter the final. They faced and defeated Pune Strykers in the final 5–2 and thus became the first ever champions of the WSH. Deepak Thakur scored 12 goals for the team.

== Team composition ==
Player	Nationality	Matches	Goals
Goalkeepers
Antoni Kindler	Canada		-
Dinesh Ekka	India	8	-
Sukhjeet Singh	India	8	-
Strikers
Akashdeep Singh	India		
Deepak Thakur	India	16	12
Didar Singh	India	5	
Gagan Ajit Singh	India	16	5
Gagandeep Singh	India	9	1
Gurjant Singh	India	16	
Inderjit Singh	India	16	1
Karamjit Singh	India	16	2
Mandeep Antil	India	16	3
Prabhdeep Singh Sr.	India	15	
Prabhjot Singh (captain)	India	13	10
Midfielders
Gurmail Singh	India		
Imran Khan	India	8	
Jasbir Singh	India	15	
Matthew Hotchkis	Australia	16	4
Simranjit Singh	India	6	
V.S. Vinaya	India	14	2
Defenders
Bikramjeet Singh	India	5	3
Harpal Singh (Vice Captain)	India	16	1
Harpreet Singh	India	16	8
Maik Gunther	Germany	6	
Tariq Aziz	Pakistan	15	2
Prabhdeep Ram	India	1	
William Xalco	India	15	

== Fixtures and results ==
=== 2012 ===
Goals for	54 (3.38 per match)
Goals against	38 (2.38 per match)
Most goals	(India) Deepak Thakur (12 goals); Overall position: 4th

No.	Date	Score	Opponent	Venue	Report
1	1 March	5 - 2	Chennai Cheetahs	Jalandhar	Match 2
2	3 March	6 - 1	Karnataka Lions	Jalandhar	Match 6
3	4 March	3 - 3	Pune Strykers	Jalandhar	Match 9
4	7 March	1 - 2	Delhi Wizards	Jalandhar	Match 15
5	8 March	1 - 3	Chandigarh Comets	Chandigarh	Match 17
6	10 March	3 - 2	Bhopal Badshahs	Bhopal	Match 22
7	14 March	3 - 2	Mumbai Marines	Mumbai	Match 27
8	16 March	5 - 2	Chandigarh Comets	Jalandhar	Match 31
9	17 March	4 - 3	Bhopal Badshahs	Jalandhar	Match 33
10	21 March	2 - 1	Mumbai Marines	Jalandhar	Match 39
11	23 March	1 - 2	Karnataka Lions	Bangalore	Match 42
12	25 March	4 - 2	Chennai Cheetahs	Chennai	Match 45
13	27 March	2 - 3	Pune Strykers	Pune	Match 49
14	30 March	5 - 7	Delhi Wizards	Delhi	Match 55
15	1 April	4 - 1	Karnataka Lions	Bangalore	Semi-final 1
16	2 April	5 - 2	Pune Strykers	Mumbai	Final
Position in league phase: 2nd Champions

== Statistics ==
Season	Matches	Won	Drawn	Lost	Win%
2012	16	10	1	5	62.50%
Home	7	5	1	1	71.43%
Away	9	5	0	4	55.56%
Overall	16	10	1	5	62.50%

Performance details
Goals for	54 (3.38 per match)
Goals against	38 (2.38 per match)
Most goals	(India) Deepak Thakur (12); Position: 4th

Performance by oppositions
Opposition	Matches	Won	Drawn	Lost	For	Against	Win%
Bhopal Badshahs	2	2	0	0	7	5	100.00%
Chandigarh Comets	2	1	0	1	6	5	50.00%
Chennai Cheetahs	2	2	0	0	9	4	100.00%
Delhi Wizards	2	0	0	2	6	9	0.00%
Karnataka Lions	3	2	0	1	11	4	66.67%
Mumbai Marines	2	2	0	0	5	3	100.00%
Pune Strykers	3	1	1	1	10	8	33.33%

=== Hat-tricks ===
No.	Player	Opposition	Result	Season	Venue	Report
1	(India) Deepak Thakur	Chandigarh Comets	5 – 2	2012	Jalandhar – Surjeet Hockey Stadium	16 March 2012
2	(India) Prabhjot Singh	Delhi Wizards	5 – 7	2012	Delhi – Dhyan Chand National Stadium	30 March 2012
