= Mumbai Marines =

Hockey team based in Mumbai, Maharashtra, India

- Nickname(s): The Marines
- Founded: 2011; 15 years ago
- Home ground: Mahindra Hockey Stadium, Mumbai (Capacity 8,250)

Personnel
- Captain: (India) Adrian D'Souza
- Owner: Ashish Bharatram; Harish Thawani
- Manager: Iqbaltit Singh
| Home | Away |

Mumbai Marines (MM), initially known as Mumbai Warriors, was a professional field hockey team based in Mumbai, Maharashtra that played in the World Series Hockey. The team was owned by Ashish Bharatram and Harish Thawani. It was coached by Andrew Meredith. Mahindra Hockey Stadium served as the home ground of Mumbai Marines.

Team was initially named as Mumbai Warriors, but was rebranded to Mumbai Marines to avoid any confusions with the Pune Warriors, IPL team.

== Franchise details ==
=== Ownership ===
ProSport Holdings, a consortium led by Ashish Bharatram and Harish Thawani, was declared as the owner of the franchise.

=== Theme song ===
Mumbai Marines' theme song Dhin Chak Chak is composed by Shadaab Abhik.

== Team composition ==
| Player | Nationality | Goals |
Goalkeepers
| Adrian D'Souza (captain) | India | - |
| Sudhir Dixit | India | - |
Strikers
| Aijub Ekka | India | 3 |
| Anup Antony | India | 1 |
| Banmali Xess | India | 3 |
| Connor Grimes | Canada | |
| Manoj Antil | India | |
| G. M. Hariprasad | India | 1 |
| Jay Karan | India | |
| Joga Singh | India | 7 |
| Juan Martin Lopez | Argentina | |
| Pedro Ibarra | Argentina | |
| Pradhan Somanna | India | |
| Sandeep Michael | India | 2 |
| S. V. Sunil | India | |
| Shashi Topno | India | |
| Troy Sutherland | Australia | 5 |
| Yuvraj Walmiki | India | |
Midfielders
| Conroy Remedios | India | |
| Devender Walmiki | India | 4 |
| Errol D’Silva | India | |
| Phelie Maguire | (Republic of Ireland) Ireland | |
| Prabodh Tirkey | India | |
| Rajesh Kumar | India | |
| Sung Min Lee | South Korea | |
| Viren Rasquinha | India | |
Defenders
| Ajmer Singh | India | 4 |
| Bimal Lakra | India | 2 |
| Melchior Looijen | Netherlands | |

== Fixtures and results ==
=== 2012 ===
| Goals for | 32 (2.29 per match) |
| Goals against | 39 (2.79 per match) |
| Most goals | (India) Joga Singh (7); Position: 6th |

| No. | Date | Score | Opponent | Venue | Report |
|---|---|---|---|---|---|
| 1 | 1 March | 5 - 7 | Pune Strykers | Mumbai | Match 3 |
| 2 | 2 March | 1 - 0 | Bhopal Badshahs | Mumbai | Match 5 |
| 3 | 4 March | 2 - 5 | Chandigarh Comets | Mumbai | Match 10 |
| 4 | 6 March | 4 - 2 | Chennai Cheetahs | Chennai | Match 13 |
| 5 | 8 March | 2 - 1 | Karnataka Lions | Bangalore | Match 16 |
| 6 | 11 March | 2 - 2 | Delhi Wizards | Mumbai | Match 24 |
| 7 | 14 March | 2 - 3 | Sher-e-Punjab | Mumbai | Match 27 |
| 8 | 16 March | 2 - 4 | Karnataka Lions | Mumbai | Match 32 |
| 9 | 19 March | 1 - 2 | Delhi Wizards | Delhi | Match 36 |
| 10 | 21 March | 1 - 2 | Sher-e-Punjab | Jalandhar | Match 39 |
| 11 | 23 March | 2 - 4 | Pune Strykers | Pune | Match 41 |
| 12 | 25 March | 1 - 2 | Bhopal Badshahs | Bhopal | Match 46 |
| 13 | 28 March | 3 - 4 | Chandigarh Comets | Chandigarh | Match 51 |
| 14 | 30 March | 4 - 1 | Chennai Cheetahs | Mumbai | Match 56 |
Position in league phase: 8th Failed to qualify for semi-finals

== Statistics ==
Performance summary
| Season | Matches | Won | Drawn | Lost | Win% |
|---|---|---|---|---|---|
| 2012 | 14 | 4 | 1 | 9 | 28.57% |
| Home | 7 | 2 | 1 | 4 | 28.57% |
| Away | 7 | 2 | 0 | 5 | 28.57% |
| Overall | 14 | 4 | 1 | 9 | 28.57% |

Performance details
| Goals for | 32 (2.29 per match) |
| Goals against | 39 (2.79 per match) |
| Most Goals | (India) Joga Singh (7); Position: 6th |

Performance by oppositions
| Opposition | Matches | Won | Drawn | Lost | For | Against | Win% |
|---|---|---|---|---|---|---|---|
| Bhopal Badshahs | 2 | 1 | 0 | 1 | 2 | 2 | 50.00% |
| Chandigarh Comets | 2 | 0 | 0 | 2 | 5 | 9 | 0.00% |
| Chennai Cheetahs | 2 | 2 | 0 | 0 | 8 | 3 | 100.00% |
| Delhi Wizards | 2 | 0 | 1 | 1 | 3 | 4 | 0.00% |
| Karnataka Lions | 2 | 1 | 0 | 1 | 4 | 5 | 50.00% |
| Pune Strykers | 2 | 0 | 0 | 2 | 7 | 11 | 0.00% |
| Sher-e-Punjab | 2 | 0 | 0 | 2 | 3 | 5 | 0.00% |

=== Hat-tricks ===
| No. | Player | Opposition | Result | Season | Venue | Report |
|---|---|---|---|---|---|---|
| 1 | (India) Joga Singh | Pune Strykers | 5 – 7 | 2012 | Mumbai – Mahindra Hockey Stadium | 1 March 2012 |
