= Chennai Cheetahs =

Professional field hockey team in Chennai, India

- Full name: Chennai Cheetahs
- Nickname(s): Cheetahs
- Founded: 2011
- Home ground: Mayor Radhakrishnan Stadium, Chennai (Capacity 8,670)

Personnel
- Captain: Brent Livermore
- Coach: Jose Brasa
- Owner: Chennai Sports Organisers Pvt. Ltd.
- Website: Official website
Home	Away

Chennai Cheetahs (CCH) was an Indian professional field hockey team based in Chennai, Tamil Nadu that played in World Series Hockey. It was owned by Chennai Sports Organisers Private Limited (CSO). The team was captained by the Australian Brent Livermore and coached by the Spaniard Jose Brasa. The team's home ground was Mayor Radhakrishnan Stadium.

== Ownership ==
The team was owned by Chennai Sports Organisers (CSO), which is promoted by L. T. Nanwani, owner of Jubilee Granites.

== Team anthem ==
The team anthem was composed by the Tamil playback singer, Srinivas. The music for the song was provided by Krishna Chetan and lyrics by Kavi Varman. It was sung by Suchith Suresan, Anand Aravindakshan and Nivas.

== Team composition ==
Player	Nationality	Goals
Goalkeepers
Bharat Chettri	India	-
Chintakunta Santosh Kumar	India	-
Jasbir Singh	India	-
Strikers
Adam Sinclair	India	9
Benedikt Sperling	Germany	
Danish Mujtaba	India	
Dharamvir Singh	India	
Hamza Mujtaba	India	
Muthanna B. K.	India	
Peter Kelly	Australia	
Parveen Kumar	India	4
Roderik Huber	Netherlands	
S. Arumugam	India	
Sandeep Antil	India	1
S. Shivamani	India	1
Veerasamy Raja	India	1
Midfielders
Amardeep Ekka	India	
Brent Livermore (captain)	Australia	
Davinderpal Singh	India	
Gaurav Tokhi	India	
Joseph Reardon	Australia	
Mark Harris	Australia	2
Rafeeq S. M.	India	
Vikas Sharma	India	1
Vikram Pillay	India	6
Defenders
Amit Kumar Prabhakar	India	
Dhananjay Mahadik	India	
Gauravjeet Singh	India	
Samir Baxla	India	
Sunil Yadav	India	1
Syed Imran Warsi	Pakistan	19

== Performance ==
Performance summary
Season	Matches	Won	Drawn	Lost	Win %
2012	14	6	1	7	46.15%

Performance details
Goals for	41 (2.93 per match)
Goals against	43 (3.07 per match)
Most goals	(Pakistan) Syed Imran Warsi (19); Position: 1st

Performance by opponents
Opposition	Matches	Won	Drawn	Lost	For	Against	Win %
Bhopal Badshahs	2	1	0	1	5	4	50.00%
Chandigarh Comets	2	1	0	1	5	6	50.00%
Delhi Wizards	2	2	0	0	11	6	100.00%
Karnataka Lions	2	1	0	1	7	6	50.00%
Mumbai Marines	2	0	0	2	3	8	0.00%
Pune Strykers	2	1	1	0	6	4	100.00%
Sher-e-Punjab	2	0	0	2	4	9	0.00%

== Fixtures and results ==
=== 2012 ===
No.	Date	Score	Opponent	Venue	Report
1	1 March	2 - 5	Sher-e-Punjab	Jalandhar	Match 2
2	3 March	5 - 3	Chandigarh Comets	Chandigarh	Match 7
3	5 March	5 - 2	Delhi Wizards	Delhi	Match 12
4	6 March	2 - 4	Mumbai Marines	Chennai	Match 13
5	9 March	3 - 3	Pune Strykers	Chennai	Match 19
6	10 March	3 - 5	Karnataka Lions	Chennai	Match 21
7	12 March	1 - 3	Bhopal Badshahs	Bhopal	Match 26
8	15 March	3 - 1	Pune Strykers	Pune	Match 29
9	17 March	4 - 1	Karnataka Lions	Bangalore	Match 34
10	20 March	4 - 1	Bhopal Badshahs	Chennai	Match 38
11	25 March	2 - 4	Sher-e-Punjab	Chennai	Match 45
12	26 March	0 - 3	Chandigarh Comets	Chennai	Match 47
13	28 March	6 - 4	Delhi Wizards	Chennai	Match 52
14	30 March	1 - 4	Mumbai Marines	Mumbai	Match 56
Position in league phase: 6th Failed to qualify for semi-finals
