= Pune Strykers =

Indian professional hockey team

- Full name: Pune Strykers
- Nickname(s): The Strikers
- Founded: 2011
- Home ground: PCMC Hockey Stadium, Pune (Capacity 5,000)

Personnel
- Captain: Ken Pereira
- Coach: Gundeep Singh
- Owner: Sai Grace Sports & Events Pvt. Ltd.
Home	Away

Pune Strykers (abbreviated as PS) was an Indian professional field hockey team based in Pune, Maharashtra that played in the World Series Hockey. The team was owned by Sai Grace Sports & Events Private Limited. PCMC Hockey Stadium in Pune is the home ground of Pune Strykers.

Pune Strykers ended up as the runner-up of the inaugural edition of World Series Hockey. They lost to Sher-e-Punjab by 5 goals to 2 in the final. Team's penalty corner expert Gurpreet Singh was their top-scorer with 12 goals.

== History ==
=== 2012 season ===
Pune Strykers suffered a major setback when they lost their captain Diwakar Ram due to injury just before the commencement of the tournament. Pune Strykers started their campaign with a victory over Mumbai Marines in a see-saw battle at Mahindra Hockey Stadium in Mumbai by 7–5. They continued with a victory over Delhi Wizards, but drew next three matches. Their undefeated run came to an end when they lost to Chandigarh Comets 3–1. They defeated table-toppers Sher-e-Punjab and Bhopal Badshahs in their final two matches. A defeat of Chennai Cheetahs by Mumbai Marines gave them their semi-final berth.

Finishing fourth on the table, they faced Chandigarh Comets in the semi-final. Down by 4–1, they struck thrice in the final 10 minutes to extend the match into the penalty shoot-out, which they won by 3–2 and entered the final to face Sher-e-Punjab. They were defeated and hence ended up at number 2 position.

Pune Strykers staged some of the brilliant comebacks in WSH 2012 and were often referred to as Masters of Comeback, the first of which came against Mumbai Marines in their opening match. They won by 7–5 despite trailing 5–3. They managed to draw with Sher-e-Punjab (3–3 from 3–1). In a must win situation, they lagged behind Bhopal Badshahs by 4 goals to 1 but ended up winning by 5–4. The greatest of all comebacks came in the semi-final against the Comets where Strykers trailed for the majority of the regulation time, but made a dramatic comeback, winning 3–2 in a penalty shoot-out.

== Franchise details ==
=== Ownership ===
Sai Grace Sports and Events Private Limited (SGSEPL) was the owner of the Pune franchise. The director of SGSEPL, Manoj Choudhary, is the promoter of Jewel Products, one of India’s leading corporate companies.

=== Team anthem ===
Pune Strykers anthem was sung by Shankar Mahadevan. The lyrics are written by Mahesh Sutar and the music is composed by Nishadh Chandra. The Universal Music Group was the music partner of the team.

=== Sponsors ===
The team was partnered by Gold's Gym for fitness and Café Coffee Day for on-ground hospitality. Radio City was their official radio partner.

=== Administration ===
- Owner - Manoj Choudhary (Sai Grace Sports & Events Pvt. Ltd.)
- CEO - Jagdeep Nanjappa
- Manager - Mervyn Fernandis
- Trainer - Simon Pachal
- Video analyst - K. R. Singh
- Physio - Meetu Mangalvedkar
- Coach - Gundeep Singh
- Assistant coach - Rahul Singh

== Team composition ==
Player	Nationality	Matches	Goals
Goalkeepers
Gurpreet Singh Guri	India	16	-
Sunny Samuel	India	11	-
Strikers
Alden D’Souza	India	7	
Amol Baban Bhosale	India		
Bikash Toppo	India	16	5
Birendra Lakra Sr.	India	16	1
Damandeep Singh	India	16	3
Gurvinder Singh Chandi	India		
Kangujam Chinglensana Singh	India		
Mario Almada	Argentina	16	6
Nikkin Thimmaiah C. A.	India	14	4
Poonacha M. G.	India		
Roshan Minz	India	16	3
Midfielders
Alvin Alexander	India		
Amardeep Ekka	India	3	
Amit Gowda	India	16	
Lungile Tsolekile	South Africa	16	1
Rajwinder Singh	India	7	
Tyron Pereira	India	16	2
Varinderjit Singh	India	7	
Vikas Pillay	India	12	2
Vikram Ramkaval Yadav	India	11	1
Defenders
Diwakar Ram	India		
Gurpreet Singh	India	16	12
Ken Pereira (captain)	Canada	16	
Kuldip Singh	India	7	
Simrandeep Singh Randhawa	India	15	7
Sunil Yadav	India	9	
Vinod Gopi Nair	India	9	

== Fixtures and results ==
=== 2012 ===
Goals for	47 (2.94 per match)
Goals against	51 (3.19 per match)
Most goals	(India) Gurpreet Singh (12 goals); Overall position: 4th

No.	Date	Score	Opponent	Venue	Report
1	1 March	7 - 5	Mumbai Marines	Mumbai	Match 3
2	3 March	3 - 1	Delhi Wizards	Delhi	Match 8
3	4 March	3 - 3	Sher-e-Punjab	Jalandhar	Match 9
4	7 March	1 - 1	Bhopal Badshahs	Pune	Match 16
5	9 March	3 - 3	Chennai Cheetahs	Chennai	Match 19
6	11 March	1 - 3	Chandigarh Comets	Pune	Match 23
7	12 March	3 - 2	Karnataka Lions	Pune	Match 25
8	15 March	1 - 3	Chennai Cheetahs	Pune	Match 29
9	19 March	3 - 4	Chandigarh Comets	Chandigarh	Match 35
10	21 March	2 - 3	Karnataka Lions	Bangalore	Match 40
11	23 March	4 - 2	Mumbai Marines	Pune	Match 41
12	26 March	2 - 6	Delhi Wizards	Pune	Match 48
13	27 March	3 - 2	Sher-e-Punjab	Pune	Match 49
14	29 March	5 - 4	Bhopal Badshahs	Bhopal	Match 54
15	1 April	3 - 2 (PS); 4 - 4 (FT)	Chandigarh Comets	Mumbai	Semi-final 2
16	2 April	2 - 5	Sher-e-Punjab	Mumbai	Final
Position in league phase: 4th Runners-up

== Statistics ==
Performance summary
Season	Matches	Won	Drawn	Lost	Win%
2012	16	7	3	6	43.75%
Home	7	3	1	3	42.86%
Away	9	4	2	3	44.44%
Overall	16	7	3	6	43.75%

Performance details
Goals for	47 (2.94 per match)
Goals against	51 (3.19 per match)
Most goals	(India) Gurpreet Singh (12); Position: 4th

Performance by oppositions
Opposition	Matches	Won	Drawn	Lost	For	Against	Win%
Bhopal Badshahs	2	1	1	0	6	5	50.00%
Chandigarh Comets	3	1	0	2	8	11	33.33%
Chennai Cheetahs	2	0	1	1	4	6	0.00%
Delhi Wizards	2	1	0	1	5	7	50.00%
Karnataka Lions	2	1	0	1	5	5	50.00%
Mumbai Marines	2	2	0	0	11	7	100.00%
Sher-e-Punjab	3	1	1	1	8	10	33.33%

=== Hat-tricks ===
No.	Player	Opposition	Result	Season	Venue	Report
1	(India) Gurpreet Singh^{4}	Mumbai Marines	7 – 5	2012	Mumbai – Mahindra Hockey Stadium	1 March 2012
2	(India) Simrandeep Singh Randhawa	Bhopal Badshahs	5 – 4	2012	Bhopal – Aishbagh Stadium	29 March 2012

^{4} Player scored 4 goals
