= Annasaheb Magar PCMC Stadium =

Stadium in Pune, India

Coordinates: 18.6365°N 73.82272°E

The Annasaheb Magar Sports Stadium
- Interactive map of The Annasaheb Magar Sports Stadium
- Full name: The Annasaheb Magar Sports Stadium
- Location: Pune, India
- Operator: PCMC, Pune
- Capacity: 5,000

Tenant
- Pune City Info

The Annasaheb Magar Sports Stadium is a multi purposed stadium in the city of Pune, India. The stadium is owned and managed by the PCMC Administration. The ground was named after Indian National Congress leader Annasaheb Magar who was Member of Parliament from 1977 to 1980 from Khed.

The stadium is meant to play for seven different game and located in 5 acres and has facilities like pavilion, toilets and a boundary size of approx. 65–70 metres. The ground faced a major problem of facilities sports facilities available in the stadium are defunct.

This sports complex is also home to one of 10 swimming pools, The Annasaheb Magar Swimming Pool.

== See also ==
- PCMC Hockey Stadium
