= Bimal Lakra =

Indian field hockey player (born 1980)

Personal information
- Born: 4 May 1980 (age 46) Simdega, Jharkhand, India

Sport
- Sport: Field hockey
- Position: Midfielder
National team
Years	Team	Caps	Goals
–	India		-
Medal record
Men's field hockey
Representing India
Asian Games
Silver medal – second place	2002 Busan	Team
Asia Cup
Gold medal – first place	2003 Kuala Lumpur	Team
Gold medal – first place	2007 Chennai	Team
Bronze medal – third place	1999 Kuala Lumpur	Team
- Updated on 25 July 2016

Bimal Lakra (born 4 May 1980) is a former Indian field hockey player who played as a midfielder for national team. He was part of the team that won the silver medal at the 2002 Asian Games.

Lakra's younger brother Birendra Lakra and younger sister Asunta Lakra have also represented India in field hockey.
