= Vasudevan Baskaran =

Field hockey player

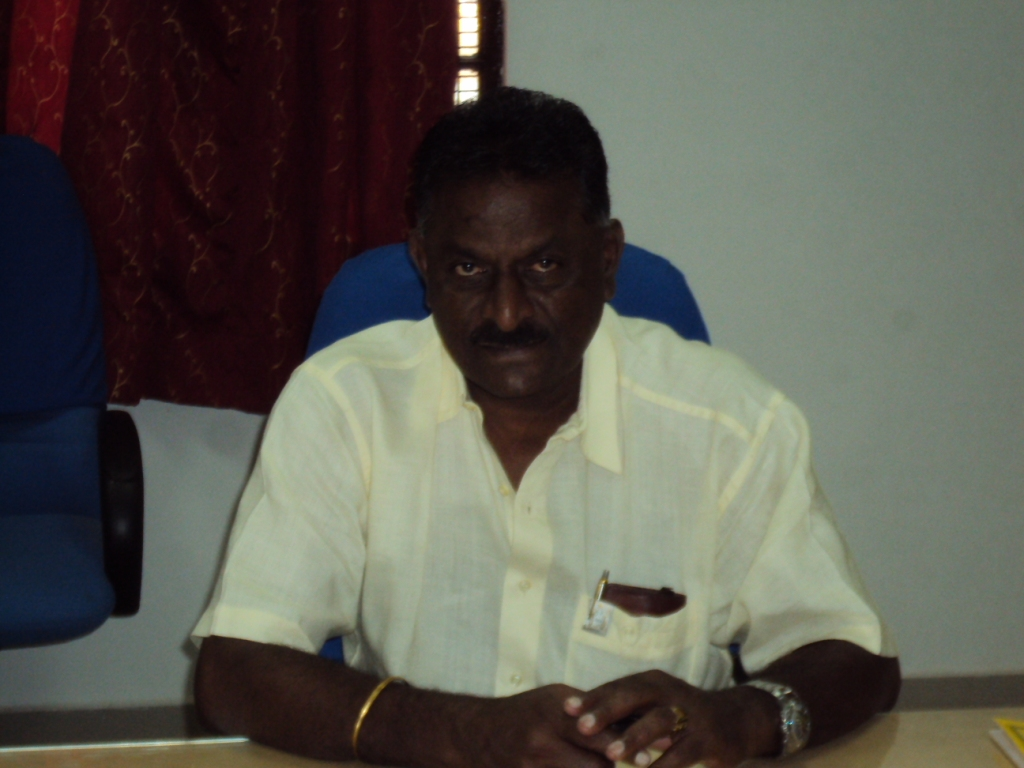

Personal information
- Born: 17 August 1950 (age 75) Chennai, India
Medal record
Men's field hockey
Representing India
Olympic Games
| Gold medal – first place | 1980 Moscow | Team |
Hockey World Cup
| Silver medal – second place | 1973 Amsterdam | Team |
Asian Games
| Silver medal – second place | 1974 Tehran | Team |
| Silver medal – second place | 1978 Bangkok | Team |

Vasudevan Baskaran (born 17 August 1950) is a former field hockey player and coach from Tamil Nadu, India. He captained the Indian national team, which won the gold medal at the 1980 Summer Olympics in Moscow, then part of the Soviet Union.

Thereafter he coached and mentored several players for the Indian team. He was the head coach of the India hockey team at the 1998 and 2006 Hockey World Cup. Now he lives with his family in Besant Nagar in Chennai, India.

== Career ==
After the Olympic gold victory, Baskaran had coached India several times, the last time at the 2006 Men's Hockey World Cup in Mönchengladbach. Currently he is the Chief Coach of Bhopal Badshahs in World Series Hockey league.

| Medal | Name | Sport | Event | Date |
|---|---|---|---|---|
| (gold) Gold | Vasudevan Baskaran | Field hockey | Field hockey at the 1980 Summer Olympics | 29 July 1980 |

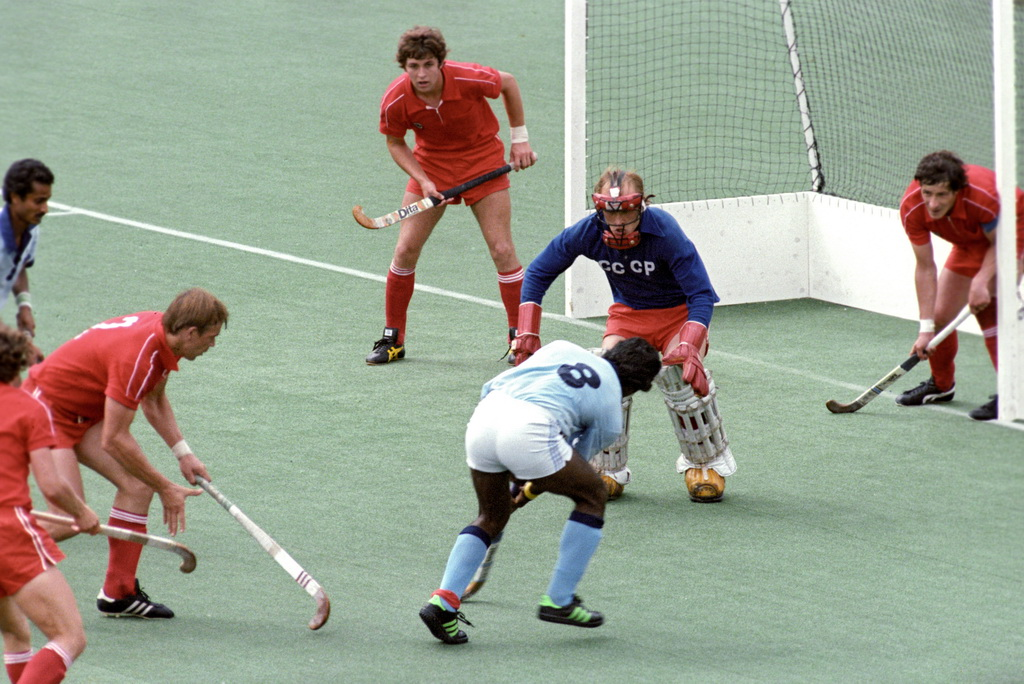
Vasudevan (shirt 8) at 1980 Summer Olympics, USSR vs. India

== Awards ==
He was awarded the Arjuna Award in (1979–1980) for his performance as a player in Olympic Games.

== See also ==
- List of Indian hockey captains in Olympics
- Field hockey in India
