= Baljeet Singh =

Indian singer

Bhai Baljeet Singh (Punjabi: ਭਾਈ ਬਲਜੀਤ ਸਿੰਘ, Hindi: भाई बलजीत सिंह) is an Indian singer. Often referred to as the "Bhai Baljeet Singh USA wale", he is a well-known name in the field of Gurbani & Kirtan worldwide. His album was composed in India & London (United Kingdom).

== Achievements ==
He started learning music at the age of seven and was taught by his father Ustaad Bhai Gajjan Singh, who was a well-known tabla player. Through his father's purchases, he learned classical singing from different teachers for several years. Thereafter he organized his own Kirtan Jatha(group) and started doing Kirtan programmes professionally. In the process, he visited different cities in India and got recognition from the Sangat (devotees). In 1992 they got the opportunity to go to London and present their devotional programmes. This was the first international performance for Bhai Baljeet Singh, who continued to have a successful career. The group's influence spread to the United States of America (U.S.A) in 2006, where they performed in Washington DC in an Interfaith concert at Pope John Paul Hall and at the White House. The group has also visited many other cities in the USA. In 2007 they performed for The Sikh Gurudwara, Grand Rapids, Michigan. Their performance was rated highly and, as a result, they were requested to be part of congregation which provided religious services throughout the world.

== Music Release ==
His Gurbani Kirtan(hymns)album has gained mass-popularity and is listed on many online and offline retail stores including popular stores like Amazon, Flipkart, Webmall India, etc.

Sadly he was found dead at his home in Ludhiana on 4th September 2026
