= Harpreet Singh (field hockey) =

Indian field hockey player

Personal information
- Nationality: Indian
- Born: 25 February 1973 (age 53)

Sport
- Sport: Field hockey
Medal record
Representing India
Men's field hockey
Asian Games
Silver medal – second place	1994 Hiroshima	Team

Harpreet Singh (born 25 February 1973) is an Indian field hockey player. He competed at the 1992 Summer Olympics and the 1996 Summer Olympics.
