= José Brasa =

Spanish field hockey coach

José Brasa is a Spanish field hockey coach. He is the current coach of Royal Ombrage Hockey Club in Belgium.

He led the Spanish women's team to their first Olympic gold medal in Barcelona, 1992. He also coached the India men's national field hockey team. He was preceded by Joaquim Carvalho. He coached the Indian team till the 2010 Asian Games in Guangzhou. He was unceremoniously sacked by Hockey India in 2010. In the World Series Hockey organised by the Indian Hockey Federation and Nimbus Sport, Brasa coaches the Chennai Cheetahs, a Chennai-based Hockey team, in the league. He did also coach the Ukraine women's national field hockey team.
