= 2003 Men's Hockey Asia Cup =

Field hockey competition

Tournament details
- Host country: Malaysia
- City: Kuala Lumpur
- Teams: 8
- Venue: Bukit Jalil National Stadium

Final positions
- Champions: India (1st title)
- Runner-up: Pakistan
- Third place: South Korea

Tournament statistics
- Matches played: 20
- Goals scored: 121 (6.05 per match)

The 2003 Men's Hockey Asia Cup was an international field hockey tournament held in Kuala Lumpur, Malaysia from 21 to 28 September 2003. It was the sixth edition of the Men's Hockey Asia Cup that started in 1982. The winner of the tournament qualified for the 2006 Men's Hockey World Cup in Germany.

Seven of the eight teams competing in the tournament had qualified via the host nation spot or by finishing in the top six of the previous tournament with the last remaining spot being played between seven teams (which was won by Hong Kong). These eight teams were separated into two groups of four teams with the top two of each group qualifying through to the semi-finals while the bottom two competed for fifth place. After competing in the same group, India and Pakistan competed in the final, which India won 4–2 to take their first title here. South Korea claimed the bronze medal after defeating Japan 4–2.

== Results ==
All Pool Stage times are (UTC+8). All Knock Out matches are (IST).

=== Pools ===
Advanced to semifinals

==== Pool A ====
Team	Pld	W	D	L	GF	GA	GD	Pts
South Korea	3	2	1	0	14	2	+12	7
Japan	3	2	0	1	10	11	−1	6
Malaysia	3	1	1	1	5	5	0	4
Hong Kong	3	0	0	3	5	16	−11	0

21 September 2003
15:30

Japan	7–3	Hong Kong
Takahashi 12'; Katayama 40', 56'; Tobita 50'; Furusato 61', 68'; Ozawa 64'	Report	Chima 20'; Akbar 51'; Ali 69'

21 September 2003
17:30

Malaysia	1–1	South Korea
Chua Boon Huat 32'	Report	Lee Jung-seon 3'

22 September 2003
15:30

Japan	3–2	Malaysia
Tobita 6', 33'; Yamabori 62'	Report	Shanmuganathan 54'; Tajol 67'

23 September 2003
15:30

South Korea	7–1	Hong Kong
Lee Gye-sung 2'; Lim Jong-chun 19'; You Hyo-sik 27'; Seo Jong-ho 54'; Kim Jung-chul 56', 58'; Jang Jong-hyun 67'	Report	Akbar 17'

24 September 2003
15:00

Hong Kong	1–2	Malaysia
Ali 20'	Report	Tajol 33'; Shanmuganathan 63'

24 September 2003
17:00

South Korea	6–0	Japan

==== Pool B ====
Team	Pld	W	D	L	GF	GA	GD	Pts
Pakistan	3	3	0	0	19	3	+16	9
India	3	2	0	1	17	5	+12	6
China	3	1	0	2	10	12	−2	3
Bangladesh	3	0	0	3	0	26	−26	0

21 September 2003
15:00

Pakistan	8–0	Bangladesh
Ali 9'; Javed 21', 46', 61'; Abbas 26', 62'; Nadeem 36'; Butt 64'	Report

21 September 2003
17:00

China	1–5	India
Song Yi 47'	Report	Tirkey 5', 36'; Gagan Ajit Singh 20'; Prabhjot Singh 41', 60'

22 September 2003
17:30

Pakistan	7–1	China
Khalid 18'; Nadeem ?', ?'; Abbas ?', ?'; Javed ?', ?'	Report	Lu Peng 34'

23 September 2003
17:30

India	10–0	Bangladesh
Tirkey 7', 55'; Thakur 11'; V. Pillay 25'; D. Pillay 32'; Michael 34'; Gagan Ajit Singh 36', 50'; Prabhjot Singh 47'; Dhillon 53'	Report

24 September 2003
15:30

Bangladesh	0–8	China
	Report	Song Yi 4', 13', 19', 36', 42', 56', 69'; Yo Haiao 17'

24 September 2003
17:30

India	2–4	Pakistan
Thakur 25'; Michael 35'	Report	Javed 11'; Abbasi 21'; Ahmed 60'; Abbas 68'

=== Fifth to eighth place classification ===
5–8th place semifinals
26 September
Malaysia	5
Bangladesh	0
26 September
China	2
Hong Kong	0

Fifth place
27 September
Malaysia	3
China	2
Seventh place
27 September
Bangladesh	3
Hong Kong	4

=== 5–8th place semi-finals ===
26 September 2003
14:30

Malaysia	5–0	Bangladesh

26 September 2003
17:00

China	2–0	Hong Kong

=== Seventh and eighth place ===
27 September 2003
15:00

Bangladesh	3–4	Hong Kong
Prince 3'; Mia 50', 55'	Report	Farooq 14'; Ali 21', 67'; Cordero 54'

=== Fifth and sixth place ===
27 September 2003
17:30

Malaysia	3–2	China
Silveraja 22'; Tajol 29'; Shanmuganathan 70'	Report	Song Yi 48'; Ya Yang 52'

=== First to fourth place classification ===
Semi-finals
26 September
South Korea	2
India	4
26 September
Pakistan	3
Japan	1

Final
28 September
India	4
Pakistan	2
Third place
28 September
South Korea	4
Japan	2

=== Semi-finals ===
26 September 2003
15:00

South Korea	2–4	India
You Hyo-sik 38'; Lee Jung-seon 69'	Report	Michael 58'; Prabhjot Singh 67'; Gagan Ajit Singh 68'; Thakur 70'

26 September 2003
17:30

Pakistan	3–1	Japan
Hussain 27'; Ali 41'; Nadeem 57'	Report	Furusato 39'

=== Third and fourth place ===
28 September 2003
15:00

South Korea	4–2	Japan
You Hyo-sik 17'; Lee Jung-seon 23', 52', 69'	Report	Yamabori 29'; Katayama 58'

=== Final ===
28 September 2003
17:30

India	4–2	Pakistan
Kanwalpreet Singh 7'; Gagan Ajit Singh 17'; Tirkey 69'; Prabhjot Singh 70'	Report	Abbas 7', 14'

== Winners ==
2003 Men's Hockey Asia Cup winners

India
First title

== Final standings ==
1. India
2. Pakistan
3. South Korea
4. Japan
5. Malaysia
6. China
7. Hong Kong
8. Bangladesh
