= Roshan Minz =

Indian field hockey player (born 1987)

Personal information
- Born: 21 October 1987 (age 38) Karadapala, Deogarh, Odisha, India

Sport
- Sport: Field hockey
- Position: Forward
National team
Years	Team	Caps	Goals
2007–2011	India	50+	-
Medal record
Men's field hockey
Representing India
Asia Cup
Gold medal – first place	2007 Chennai	Team
Asian Champions Trophy
Gold medal – first place	2011 Ordos City

Roshan Minz (born 21 October 1987) is an Indian field hockey player who played as a forward. He was part of the Indian team that won gold at the 2007 Men's Hockey Asia Cup.

== Career ==
Minz hails from Deogarh district. He started his career as a defender, but later started playing forward from 2001, at Junior Nehru hockey tournament in Delhi. He was part of the Indian team that won gold at the inaugural 2011 Asian Men's Hockey Champions Trophy.
