= Union Academy Senior Secondary School, New Delhi =

School in New Delhi, India

Coordinates: 28.6312°N 77.2106°E

Union Academy Senior Secondary School, New Delhi is located in Raja Bajar, New Delhi.

== History ==
The Union Academy Senior Secondary School's history dates back to 1887, when it was founded in Shimla under the name 'Bengalee Boys High School'. It was established on 22 September 1934 by the Viceroy's Executive Council.
