= Gagan Ajit Singh =

Indian field hockey player

Personal information
- Born: 9 December 1980 (age 45) Firozpur, Punjab, India

Sport
- Sport: Field hockey
- Position: Forward
Senior career
Years	Team	Caps	Goals
–	Punjab Police	-	-
2005–2007	HC Klein Zwitserland	-	-
–	Hoofdklasse	-	-
2012	Sher-e-Punjab	16	5
National team
Years	Team	Caps	Goals
–2001	India U21		-
1997–2007	India	200+	(100+)
Medal record
Men's field hockey
Representing India
Asian Games
Silver medal – second place	2002 Busan	Team
Asia Cup
Gold medal – first place	2003 Kuala Lumpur	Team
Bronze medal – third place	1999 Kuala Lumpur	Team
Champions Challenge
Gold medal – first place	2001 Kuala Lumpur	Team
Junior World Cup
Gold medal – first place	2001 Hobart	Team

Gagan Ajit Singh (born 9 December 1980) is an Indian former field hockey player who played as a forward. He was the captain of the India national under-21 team that won the 2001 Junior World Cup. He was a member of the Indian senior national team at the 2000 Sydney and 2004 Athens Olympic Games.

== Biography ==
Gagan Ajit Singh was born on 9 December 1980 in Firozpur, a city in the Indian State of Punjab. His father Ajit Singh was also an Olympian and played for India at the 1976 Montreal Olympics. His uncle Harmik Singh is another Olympian. Gagan Ajit was educated at the Union Academy Senior Secondary School and Jamia Millia Islamia in New Delhi.

Singh trained in hockey at the Government Arts and Sports College in Jalandhar in 1995. In 1997, he was selected by New Delhi's Air India Hockey Academy to compete in the junior national tournament. Singh scored 26 goals and emerged as the tournament's top-scorer. He captained the side in 1999.

Singh made his senior national debut in 1997 during a test series against Russia. Singh played at the 2000 and the 2004 Summer Olympics, with India finishing in seventh place on both occasions. Singh was the top-scorer for India with seven goals in the latter competition.
