= Vikram Pillay =

Indian field hockey player

Vikram Vishnu Pillay
Personal information
- Born: 17 November 1981 (age 44) Khadki, Maharashtra, India

Sport
- Sport: Field hockey
- Position: Halfback
Senior career
Years	Team	Caps	Goals
–	Indian Airlines	-	-
2015	Dabang Mumbai	2	0
National team
Years	Team	Caps	Goals
–	India	204	(30)
Medal record
Men's field hockey
Representing India
Asian Games
Silver medal – second place	2002 Busan	Team
Bronze medal – third place	2010 Guangzhou	Team
Asia Cup
Gold medal – first place	2003 Kuala Lumpur	Team
Commonwealth Games
Silver medal – second place	2010 Delhi	Team
Champions Challenge
Gold medal – first place	2001 Kuala Lumpur	Team
Hockey Junior World Cup
Gold medal – first place	2001 Hobart	Team
- Updated on 23 January 2015

Vikram Vishnu Pillay is a hockey midfielder from India.

== Career ==
=== Early career ===
He helped India winning gold in Hockey Junior World Cup in 2001.

=== Senior career ===
Vikram made his international debut for India in 2002 during a 4 nation tournament in Adelaide, South Australia. He was a member of Indian team in Athens Olympics in 2004, where India finished in 7th place.
