= Casey Henwood =

New Zealand field hockey player

Casey Henwood (born 16 December 1980) is a New Zealand field hockey player who competed in the 2008 Summer Olympics.
