= Deepak Thakur =

Indian field hockey player

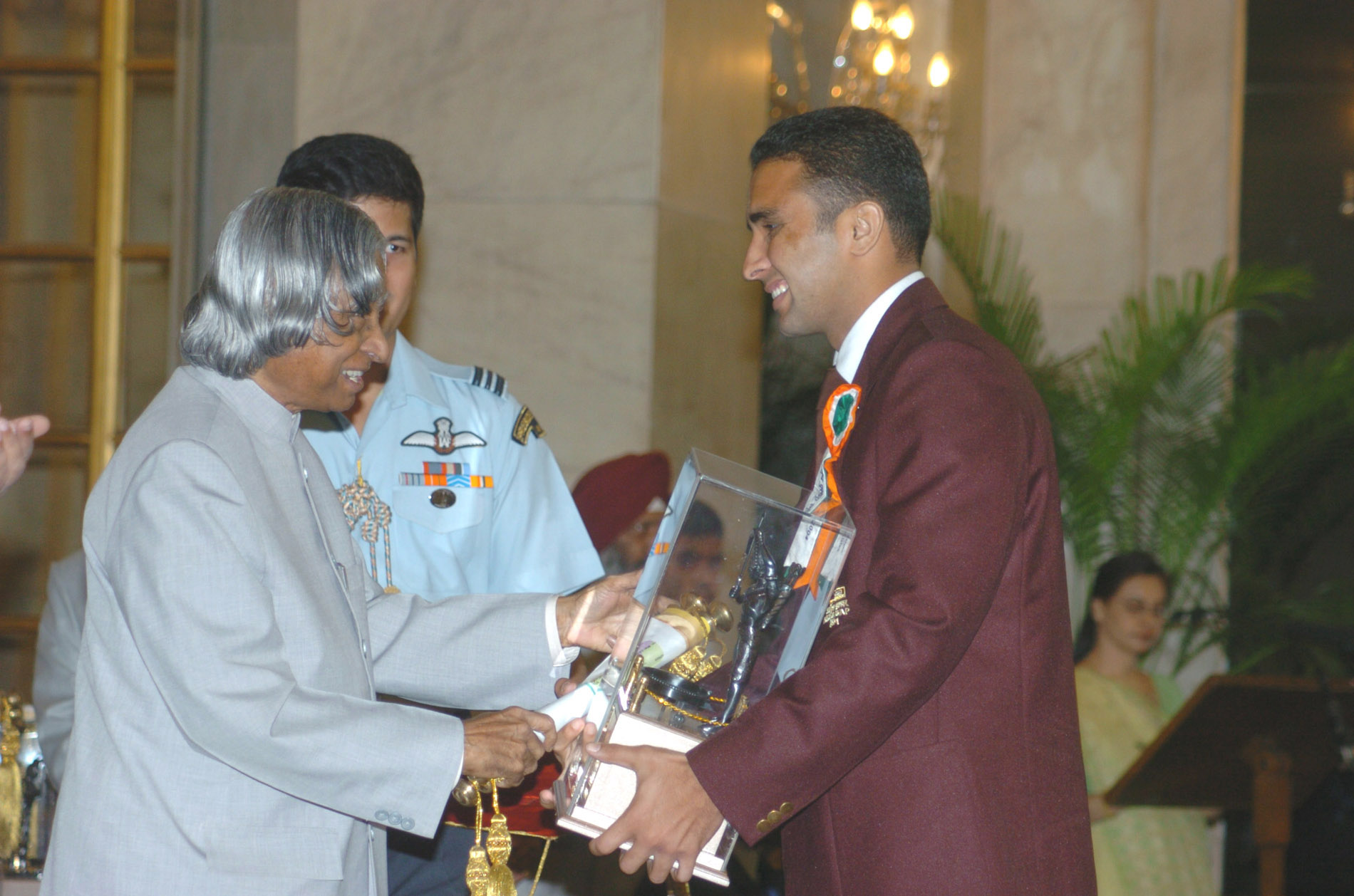
- Thakur (right) receiving the Arjuna Award from President A. P. J. Abdul Kalam (left), 2005

Personal information
- Full name: Deepak Thakur Sonkhla
- Born: 28 December 1980 (age 45) Bhamowal, Hoshiarpur, Punjab, India

Sport
- Sport: Field hockey
- Position: Forward
Senior career
Years	Team	Caps	Goals
–	Indian Oil Corporation	-	-
2007	HTC Stuttgarter Kickers	-	-
2012	Sher-e-Punjab	16	12
National team
Years	Team	Caps	Goals
1999–2010	India	69+	(73)
Medal record
Men's field hockey
Representing India
Asian Games
Silver medal – second place	2002 Busan	Team
Asia Cup
Gold medal – first place	2003 Kuala Lumpur	Team
Bronze medal – third place	1999 Kuala Lumpur	Team
Commonwealth Games
Silver medal – second place	2010 Delhi	Team
Junior World Cup
Gold medal – first place	2001 Hobart	Team

Deepak Thakur Sonkhla (born 28 December 1980), popularly known as Deepak Thakur, was a hockey forward in Indian team.

== Family ==
Thakur's father was an ex-serviceman and his mother a house-wife. His younger sister was a national badminton player.

== Career ==
=== Junior level ===
Thakur became popular after his solo effort, A goal poacher, Deepak Thakur rose from the junior ranks when he scored a hat-trick in the 2001 Junior World Cup final against Australia leading India to the titleard showing 6–1. He finished the tournament with ten goals and was named the 'top scorer of the world cup . Born in hoshiarpur, Punjab. Thakur took up hockey on his father's insistence and was among the most consistent scorers in 2003, when Indian hockey made considerable progress winning four tournaments. Thakur made up for one of the most lethal attack line along with Gagan Ajit Singh and Prabhjot Singh, in a career spanning over eight years. He played in 2000 Sydney and 2004 Athens Olympics.

=== Senior level ===
He debuted for the senior national team in June 1999 against Germany. He was part of national squad in 2000 Sydney and 2004 Athens Olympic.

== Awards ==
He was awarded Arjuna Award in 2004 for taking Indian hockey to next higher level.
