= Harpal Singh (field hockey) =

Indian field hockey player

Personal information
- Born: 11 October 1983 (age 42) Sirsa, Haryana, India

Sport
- Sport: Field hockey
- Position: Defender
National team
Years	Team	Caps	Goals
–	India		-
- Updated on 25 July 2016

Harpal Singh (born 11 October 1983) is a former Indian field hockey player who played as a defender for the national team. He was part of the Indian team that competed at the 2004 Summer Olympics. He was born in Sirsa
