= Prabhjot Singh (field hockey) =

Indian field hockey player

Personal information
- Born: 14 August 1980 (age 46) Gurdaspur, Punjab, India

Sport
- Sport: Field hockey
- Position: Forward
Senior career
Years	Team	Caps	Goals
2012	Sher-e-Punjab	13	10
2013	Mumbai Magicians	-	-
National team
Years	Team	Caps	Goals
2001–2013	India	218	-
Medal record
Men's field hockey
Representing India
Asian Games
Silver medal – second place	2002 Busan	Team
Asia Cup
Gold medal – first place	2003 Kuala Lumpur	Team
Gold medal – first place	2007 Chennai	Team
Commonwealth Games
Silver medal – second place	2010 Delhi	Team
Champions Challenge
Gold medal – first place	2001 Kuala Lumpur	Team
Bronze medal – third place	2007 Boom	Team
Junior World Cup
Gold medal – first place	2001 Hobart	Team

Prabhjot Singh is an Indian former field hockey player who played for the Indian national hockey team. He is best known for his fast and attacking play.

== Career ==
Prabhjot debuted for the Men's National Team in 2001. He was part of the national squad in the 2004 Athens Olympic, where India finished in 7th place. Apart from representing India in hockey, he is also an officer in Indian Oil. He was the captain of the Sher-e-Punjab team in the World Series Hockey in 2012. Prabhjot is an alumnus of Jamia Millia Islamia, New Delhi.

== Awards ==
He was awarded the Arjuna Award in 2008 for exceptional performance as an Indian striker.

== Controversy ==
During FIH World Cup, 2010 he showed the middle finger to the home crowd after a loss 2–4 loss against Argentina. He later apologized for this act.
