= Sameer Dad =

Indian field hockey player

Personal information
- Full name: Sameer Dad
- Born: 25 November 1978 (age 47) Bhopal, Madhya Pradesh, India

Sport
- Sport: Field hockey
National team
Years	Team	Caps	Goals
–	India		-
Medal record
Men's field hockey
Representing India
Asian Games
Gold medal – first place	1998 Bangkok	Team

Sameer Dad (born 25 November 1978 in Bhopal, Madhya Pradesh) is a former field hockey forward who played for India.

== International appearances ==
Dad made his international senior debut for the Indian Men's National Team in January 1998, during the test series against Germany. Prior to his entry into the senior team, also he was played India v/s Pakistan test series in Pakistan he scored 3 vital goal to level the series 2-2 and achieve best player in this series.. he was a member of India's Hockey Junior World Cup team in 1997 in England. He was a member of the Indian team at the 1998 Asian Games, where India won the gold medal after 32 years at Bangkok, and at the 1998 Men's Hockey World Cup in Holland. He was part of India's team at the Men's Hockey Asia Cup at Malaysia in 1999 and represented India at the 2000 Summer Olympics in Sydney, Australia, where India finished seventh. He scored two goals in the tournament.

His other notable matches include a 2002 World Cup qualifier in Scotland and India's 2003 Australia tour. After an injury in 2003, he was dropped from the team.

== Family ==
His brother Mohammad Yousuf played for the Indian team as a left-winger. His nephew Affan Yousuf was a member of the team.
