= Waseem Ahmed (field hockey) =

Pakistani field hockey player (born 1977)

Waseem Ahmad
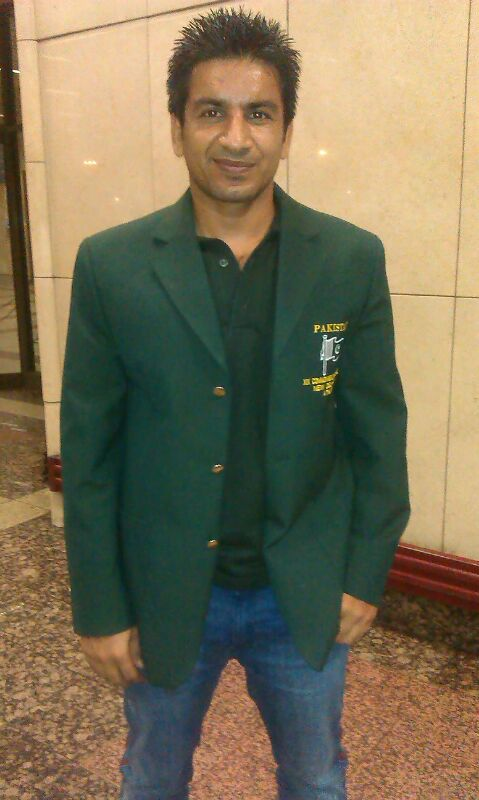

Personal information
- Born: 10 April 1977 (age 49) Vehari, Punjab, Pakistan

Sport
- Sport: Field hockey
- Position: Left Half, Center Half
- Club: Waseem Hockey Club; WAPDA; Mentone Hockey Club, Melbourne
Senior career
Years	Team	Caps	Goals
1996–2002	Habib Bank Limited	400+	40
2002–present	WAPDA	-	-
2004–2010	HC Rotterdam, Netherlands	-	-
2005 season	Hyderabad Sultans, Premier Hockey League	-	-
2011–12 season	Bhopal Badshahs, World Series Hockey	-	-
2013–14 season	KL Hockey Club, Malaysia Hockey League	-	-
2013–14 season	Punjab Sports Club; Hong Kong Premier Hockey League	-	-
National team
Years	Team	Caps	Goals
1996–	Pakistan	410	(37)
Coaching career
- 2022: Acme Chattrogram
Medal record
Men's field hockey
Representing Pakistan
Asian Champions Trophy
Gold medal – first place	2012 Doha	Team
Silver medal – second place	2011 Ordos City	Team
Asian Games
Gold medal – first place	2010 Guangzhou	Team
Bronze medal – third place	1998 Bangkok	Team
Commonwealth Games
Bronze medal – third place	2002 Manchester	Team
Hockey Champions Challenge
Silver medal – second place	2009 Salta	Team
Champions Trophy
Silver medal – second place	1996 Chennai	Team
Silver medal – second place	1998 Lahore	Team
Bronze medal – third place	2002 Cologne	Team
Bronze medal – third place	2003 Amstelveen	Team
Bronze medal – third place	2004 Lahore	Team
Bronze medal – third place	2012 Melbourne	Team
Hockey Asia Cup
Silver medal – second place	1999 Kuala Lumpur	Team
Silver medal – second place	2003 Kuala Lumpur	Team
Silver medal – second place	2009 Kuantan	Team
Bronze medal – third place	2013 Ipoh	Team

Waseem Ahmad TI (Punjabi, Urdu: وسیم احمد), (born 10 April 1977) is a Pakistani former field hockey player and ex-captain of the Pakistan hockey team. He belongs to Randhawa sub-caste of a Jats.

Physical Status
Height	5'7"
Weight	65 kg
Body Measurements	Not Available
Eye Color	Dark Brown
Hair Color	Black

Family Details
Parents	Mother (alive)
Wife	Gul Tariq
Siblings	6
Children	4

== Career ==
Waseem is regarded as one of the best left-halves in the world.He became the most capped midfielder and most capped player for Pakistan. After announcing his retirement from International hockey during a press conference held after Pakistan-India third-place match of 26th Champions Trophy in Lahore, he later staged a comeback to international hockey in 2006 for World Cup and retired immediately after Pakistan team campaign in London Olympics 2012.

Tamgha-e-Imtiaz

Waseem was awarded Tamgha-e-Imtiaz (Award of Excellence) for his services in the field of hockey by the Government of Pakistan.

== See as well ==
- Pakistan Hockey Federation
