= Arjun Halappa =

Indian field hockey player (born 1980)

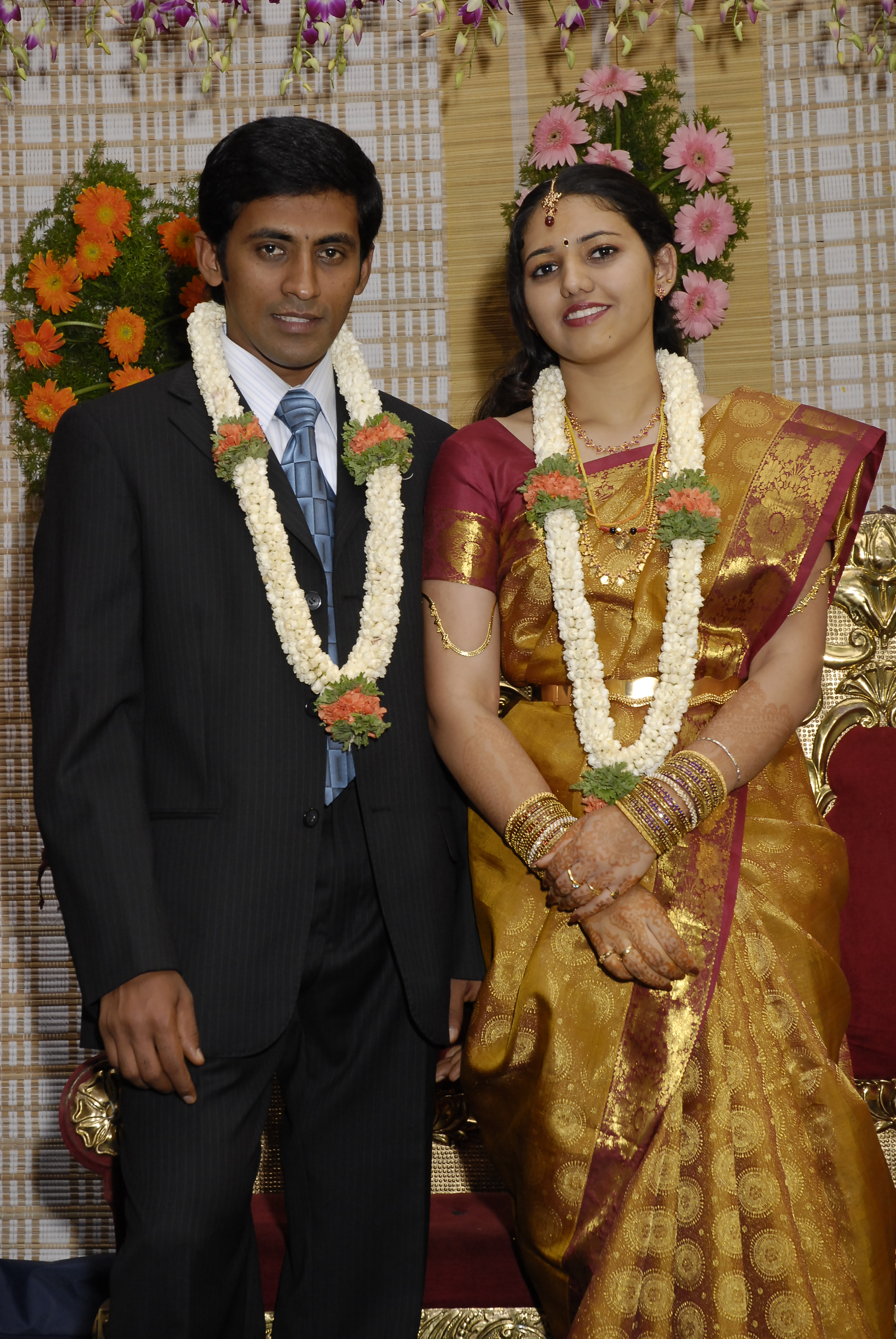

Personal information
- Born: 18 December 1980 (age 45) Somwarpet, Kodagu; Karnataka, India
- Height: 5 ft 5 in (1.65 m)

Sport
- Sport: Field hockey
- Position: Forward
Senior career
| Years | Team | Caps | Goals |
| – | Air India | - | - |
| 2005–2008 | Bangalore Hi-Fliers | - | - |
| 2012 | Karnataka Lions | 12 | 3 |
| 2015–2017 | Dabang Mumbai | 2 | 0 |
National team
| Years | Team | Caps | Goals |
| 2001–2010 | India | 250+ | - |
Medal record
Men's field hockey
Representing India
Commonwealth Games
| Silver medal – second place | 2010 Delhi | Team |
Champions Challenge
| Gold medal – first place | 2001 Kuala Lumpur | Team |
Asian Games
| Bronze medal – third place | 2010 Guangzhou | Team |
Junior World Cup
| Gold medal – first place | 2001 Hobart | Team |

Arjun Halappa (born 13 December 1980) is a former Indian hockey player and former captain of Indian hockey team.

== Career ==
Midfield maestro Arjun Halappa is the son of former East Bengal Club player B. K. Halappa,

He hails from Kodagu (Coorg) District, Karnataka. He joined the Centre of Excellence in 1998 and a year later played his first Senior Nationals at Hyderabad, and was picked among the 72 probables for a conditioning camp. He made his junior international debut in the Europe tour same year under coaches C.R. Kumar and Harendera. He posted eight goals in the 2000 Junior Asia Cup.

He made his international debut for the Men's National Team in March 2001 against Egypt in the Prime Minister's Gold Cup. Halappa represented India at the 2004 Summer Olympics, where India finished in seventh place. He represented India at the 2010 Commonwealth Games in New Delhi, where India finished in second place.

== Personal life ==
He married Bhavana on 12 October 2008 at Somwarpet, Kodagu.
