= Adrian D'Souza =

Indian field hockey player

Adrian Joseph Albert D'Souza
Personal information
- Born: 24 March 1984 (age 42) Mumbai, Maharashtra, India
- Height: 5 ft 11 in (180 cm)

Sport
- Sport: Field hockey
- Position: Goalkeeper
Senior career
Years	Team	Caps	Goals
–	Bombay Customs, Mumbai	-	-
–	Air India, Mumbai	-	-
–	Bharat Petroleum Corp. Ltd.	-	-
–	Indian Airlines	-	-
–	Maratha Warriors	-	-
National team
Years	Team	Caps	Goals
2002-Present	India	165	-
Medal record
Men's Field Hockey
Representing India
Asia Cup
Gold medal – first place	2007 Chennai	Team
Champions Challenge
Bronze medal – third place	2007 Boom	Team
Sultan Azlan Shah
Silver medal – second place	2008 Ipoh	Team
Bronze medal – third place	2006 Kuala Lumpur	Team

Adrian Albert D'souza (born 24 March 1984 in Mumbai, Maharashtra) is an Indian field hockey goalkeeper, who made his international debut for the men's national team in January 2004 during the Sultan Azlan Shah Hockey Tournament in Kuala Lumpur, Malaysia. Adrian has more than 100 international caps for his country in all competitions. He has played in all major field hockey tournaments, including the 2006 Hockey World Cup, 2006 Asian Games, 2007 Asia Cup and 2 Champions Trophies. Adrian is known for bringing the rushing technique to the hockey field as a goalkeeper. He has competed in 3 of the 4 major international hockey events held once every four years: the Olympics, World Cup and Asian Games, with a total of 165 caps for his country.

== Early life and education ==
D'Souza attended St. Anne's School in Mumbai until grade 10. After completing grade 12 at Khalsa Junior College, Mumbai, he earned a bachelor's degree in sociology from Rizvi College, Mumbai. He also played football. At 17, D'Souza was selected for the Air India Hockey Academy in New Delhi.

== Career ==
D'Souza's introduction to hockey came by chance at the age of 9. The regular goalkeeper of his school team did not report for a game, and D'Souza agreed to play as a replacement. He had a broken tooth by the end of the match and promised never to play keeper again. However, his coach was impressed, and he continued playing in goal. At the age of 20, he was one of the youngest hockey players to play at the Olympics.

=== Domestic clubs ===
His first domestic hockey club was Mumbai Customs in 2001. In 2002, he was selected to play for Air India, won the best goalkeeper award at the Bombay Gold Cup, and was called up for his first Senior Hockey National Camp. D'Souza joined B.P.C.L in 2003 and Indian Airlines, which is now part of Air India, in 2005 .

=== International ===
Total Caps - 165

D'Souza won the best goal-keeper award as part of the Junior India team that participated in the 6th Nation Junior Champions Challenge at Gniezno, Poland, in 2003. He made his senior international debut in the Sultan Azlan Shah Cup in Kuala Lumpur in January 2004. His performance in the Junior Asia Cup in April, which India won, earned him the best goalkeeper award. This was followed by four-nation tournaments in Japan, the Netherlands and Germany. He represented India at the 2004 Athens Olympics, where India finished 7th. In the 8- match Test series between India and Pakistan in October 2004, he was named the best goalkeeper for the Pakistan leg (4 matches) and the best player of the series.

D'Souza was captain of the Indian team at the 2005 Junior Hockey World Cup. The same year, he was part of the junior team in the six- nation invitational tournament in Kuala Lumpur, Malaysia. In 2006, the Indian team had several major tournaments, and the selectors expected D'Souza to play a pivotal role in the team. He represented the team in the Sultan Azlan Shah tournament (Malaysia) in June, the Champions Trophy (Spain) in July, the World Cup (Germany) in September, and the Asian Games (Qatar) in December, but missed the Commonwealth Games in Australia due to an injury. In 2007, he was part of the bronze-winning team at the Champions Challenge in Belgium and the gold- winning team at the Asia Cup. A hamstring injury forced D'Souza to withdraw from the 2008 Olympic Qualifier camp. India lost to Great Britain in the final and missed the Olympics for the first time in 80 years. He returned after a two-month break and was selected for the two- legged four-nation tournament in Perth and Darwin. The tournament also included hosts Australia, China and South Korea. D'Souza played in the 2008 Sultan Azlan Shah Cup, including the semi-final against Malaysia, in which India scored from a penalty corner to reach the final of the tournament for the first time in 13 years. India lost the final to Argentina in extra time. His last international tournament was the Sultan Azlan Shah Cup in 2012.

=== Franchise leagues ===
Adrian played in the Premier Hockey League for the Maratha Warriors. He participated in the inaugural Pakistan Super Hockey League, organized by the Pakistan Hockey Federation, representing the Baloch Lions, and received the 2nd best goalkeeper award. Adrian then had his first stint with an international club, playing for Koln Club (Marienburger SC) in Germany. He went on to play World Series Hockey for Mumbai Marines. In the Hockey India League, he played for his hometown club Dabang Mumbai.

== Awards and nominations ==
- Was nominated for the prize of the World's Most Promising Young player Award for the year 2004 by the FIH.
- Was awarded India's "Player of the Year" for the year 2004 by the Indian Hockey Year Book.
- Was awarded the HISA (Hero Indian Sports Academy) award for best Indian Hockey player of the year for 2004.
- Was awarded the prestigious Chattrapati Shivaji State Award in 2006.

== Personal life ==
D'Souza's jersey number was 12, which he considered lucky. He had his helmets custom- made by OBO and designed the graphics himself. He has the Olympic rings tattooed on his torso.
