= Andrew Meredith =

Australian field hockey coach

Andrew Meredith (born 24 April 1972) previously worked as Director of Performance Analysis and Innovation Architect at 1. Bundesliga club FC St. Pauli.

== Football ==
October 2013, saw him engaged as a High Performance consultant for the Hamburg Bundesliga Football club FC St. Pauli, which later led to an expanded full-time role in December 2013 where he was contracted as Innovation Architect and Head of Performance Analysis until August 2019.
