= Gabbar Singh (field hockey) =

Canadian field hockey player

Personal information
- Born: 15 November 1978 (age 47) India
Medal record
Men's field hockey
Representing Canada
Pan American Games
Gold medal – first place	2007 Rio de Janeiro	Team
Silver medal – second place	2011 Guadalajara	Team

Sukhwinder "Gabbar" Singh (born 15 November 1978 in Batala, India) is an Indian-born Canadian field hockey player, who is a member of the Canada national field hockey team that won the gold medal at the 2007 Pan American Games. He plays in the Premier League in Vancouver, Canada for United Brothers Field Hockey Club. Gabbar started playing hockey in India at a young age and by the time he reached his late teenage years, he was already playing for Punjab Police, a well recognized team in India. His recent matches are his Australian tour and also the 7 test series against India in British Columbia, Canada
