= Lloyd Stephenson =

New Zealand field hockey player

Personal information
- Born: 10 May 1981 (age 45)
Medal record
Men's field hockey
Representing New Zealand
Champions Challenge
Silver medal – second place	2007 Boom	Team

Lloyd Stephenson (born 10 May 1981 in Thames Valley) is a field hockey player from New Zealand, who earned his first cap for the national team, nicknamed The Black Sticks, in April 2001. Originally from Thames Valley, the striker/midfielder was based in Perth for 2005, but played in New Zealand most recently for North Harbour. He helped New Zealand qualify for the 2004 Summer Olympics in Athens as a member of the Olympic qualifying team, but experienced striker Bevan Hari was selected for the final squad. He returned to the team for a home series against Malaysia, and toured Europe in July 2005. After 102 caps for the national team he retired in 2009.

== International senior tournaments ==
- 2003 – Sultan Azlan Shah Cup, Kuala Lumpur
- 2004 – Olympic Qualifying Tournament, Madrid
- 2004 – Champions Trophy
- 2006 – World Cup
