= PCMC Hockey Stadium =

Field hockey stadium in Maharashtra, in India

The Major Dhyanachand Hockey Stadium
- Interactive map of The Major Dhyanachand Hockey Stadium
- Full name: PCMC Hockey Stadium
- Location: Pune, India
- Owner: PCMC, Pune
- Capacity: 5,000

Construction
- Built: 1993
- Renovated: 2011

Tenant
- World Series Hockey

PCMC Hockey Stadium also known as The Major Dhyanachand Stadium is a field hockey stadium in the city of Pune, India. It has a seating capacity of 5,000 people. It serves as the home ground of the hockey franchisee based in Pune Strykers, for World Series Hockey.

== History ==
It was built in 1993, was the first polygrass stadium of the district. It costed ₹1.15 crore to build this stadium. Women's hockey matches of National Games which were held in 1993.

== Major renovations ==
The stadium has been renovated by the PCMC Administration at a cost of ₹2.75 crore to improve the infrastructure at the stadium. Four high-mast floodlights with a capacity of 1,200 lux have been set up at the stadium. Seven matches of the home side, Pune Strykers, are scheduled in World Series Hockey between 29 February to 2 April.

== See also ==
- Annasaheb Magar PCMC Stadium
