= Mahindra Hockey Stadium =

Field hockey stadium in Mumbai, India

- Interactive map of Mahindra Hockey Stadium
- Former names: Bombay Hockey Association Stadium
- Location: Mumbai, Maharashtra, India
- Coordinates: 18°56′15″N 72°49′34″E
- Owner: Bombay Hockey Association
- Capacity: 8,250

Tenants
- Maratha Warriors (2005–08); Mumbai Marines (2012–present); Mumbai Magicians (2013–2014); Dabang Mumbai (2015–present)

Mahindra Hockey Stadium is a field hockey stadium at Mumbai, Maharashtra, India. It is the home of the Mumbai Marines of the World Series Hockey and Mumbai Magicians of the Hockey India League. It was also the home venue of the Maratha Warriors in the Premier Hockey League. The stadium was formerly known as the Bombay Hockey Association Stadium and hosted the 1982 Men's Hockey World Cup.
