= Mayor Radhakrishnan Hockey Stadium =

Building in India

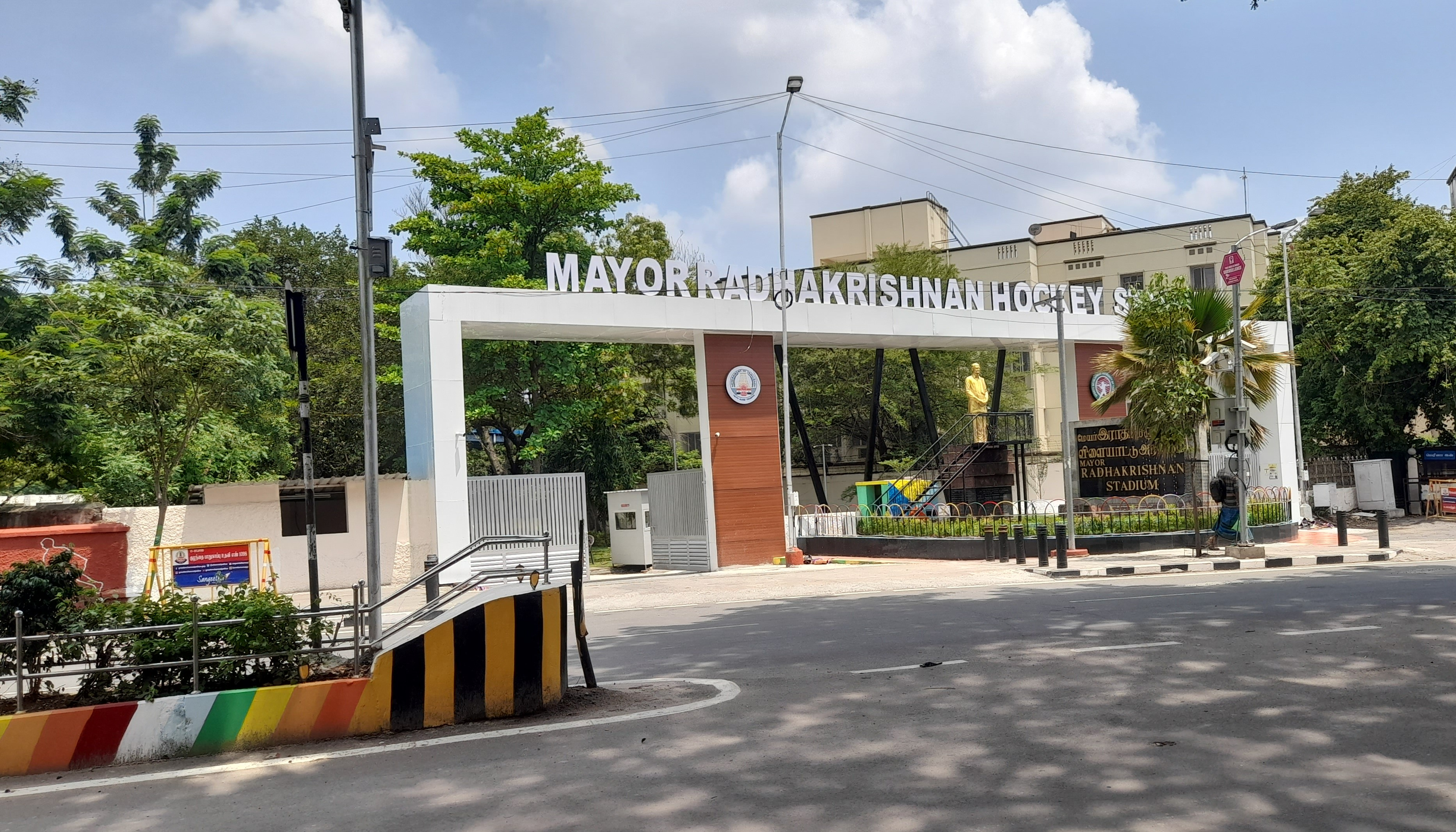
- Interactive map of Mayor Radhakrishnan Hockey Stadium
- Full name: Mayor Radhakrishnan Stadium
- Location: Chennai, Tamil Nadu, India
- Coordinates: 13.0756°N 80.2626°E
- Owner: Sports Development Authority of Tamil Nadu
- Capacity: 8,670
- Surface: Artificial Turf
- Public transit: MTC

Construction
- Built: 1995
- Renovated: 2005
- Cost: ₹8 crore (US$830,000)

Tenant
- Chennai Cheetahs (2012)

Mayor Radhakrishnan Stadium is a field hockey stadium at Chennai, Tamil Nadu, India. Named after M. Radhakrishna Pillai, it is one of the international hockey stadiums situated at Tamil Nadu, followed by the Madurai International Hockey Stadium at Madurai, Tamil Nadu.

It was built in 1995 to host the 1996 Men's Champions Trophy. Later it hosted the tournament again in December 2005. It was also the venue for 2007 edition of Asian Hockey Championship, in which India triumphed by a thumping margin of 7–2 over South Korea.

The stadium is also the venue for all division matches of the Chennai Hockey Association. It was the home ground of the World Series Hockey team Chennai Cheetahs in 2012. The stadium hosts several Hockey India League games stadium since 2025.

== Major international events ==
=== 1996 Men's Hockey Champions Trophy ===
The 1996 Men's Champions Trophy took place from 7–15 December 1996 in the newly built Mayor Radhakrishnan Stadium in Madras (now Chennai), India. Participating nations in this post-Olympic tournament were: Australia, titleholders Germany, hosting nation India, Netherlands, Pakistan, and Spain.

=== 2005 Hockey Champions Trophy ===
The 2005 Men's Hockey Champions Trophy is the 27th tournament of the Hockey Champions Trophy for men. It was held in Chennai, India from 10 to 18 December 2005.

=== 2007 Men's Hockey Asia Cup ===
The 2007 Men's Hockey Asia Cup is the seventh tournament of the Hockey Asia Cup for men. It was held from 31 August – 9 September 2007 in Chennai, India.India claimed the gold, Korea the silver and Malaysia the bronze.

== Major domestic events ==
1. All India MCC Murugappa Gold Cup Hockey Tournament, Chennai
2. 2012 World Series Hockey

== Renovation ==
In 2004, the stadium was redesigned and upgraded by the Sports Authority of Tamil Nadu to prepare the venue for hosting the 2005 Champions Trophy in December. After the renovation drive, the stadium features a re-laid synthetic hockey surface and floodlights of international standards.

== See also ==
- Madurai International Hockey Stadium
- 2025 Men's FIH Hockey Junior World Cup
