= Surjit Hockey Stadium =

Field hockey stadium in Jalandhar, India

- Interactive map of Surjit Hockey Stadium
- Full name: Olympian Surjit Singh Hockey Stadium
- Location: Jalandhar, Punjab, India
- Coordinates: 31°20′35″N 75°33′27″E
- Owner: Department of Sports, Punjab
- Capacity: 7,000

Construction
- Renovated: 2009

Tenants
- India men's national field hockey team (2026); Surjit Hockey Society; Punjab Warriors (2013); Sher-e-Punjab (2012)

The Surjit Hockey Stadium, also sometimes spelled as Surjeet Hockey Stadium, is a field hockey stadium in Jalandhar, Punjab, India. It is named after Jalandhar-born Olympian Surjit Singh. This stadium is home of the franchise Sher-e-Punjab of the World Series Hockey and Punjab Warriors of Hockey India League. It is established by the members of the Surjit Hockey Society.
