= Chandigarh Hockey Stadium =

Field hockey stadium in India

Coordinates: 30°43′44″N 76°44′45″E

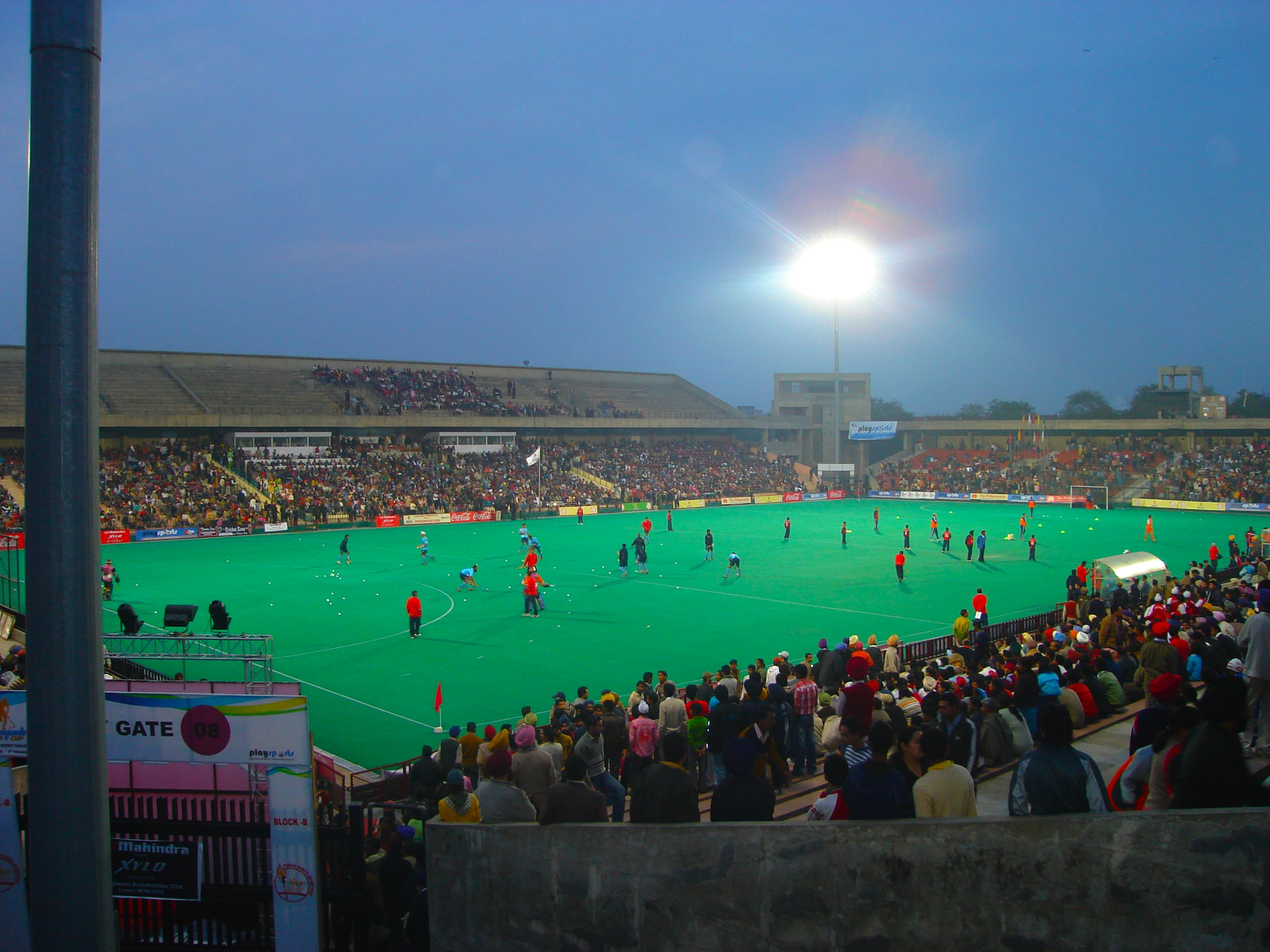
- Interactive map of Chandigarh Hockey Stadium
- Location: Chandigarh, India
- Owner: Municipal Corporation Chandigarh
- Capacity: 30,000

Construction
- Renovated: 2007

Tenant
- Punjab Warriors (2016–2017)

The Chandigarh Hockey Stadium is a field hockey stadium at Chandigarh, India. It was the home of the Chandigarh Dynamos of the Premier Hockey League. It has a seating capacity of 30,000 people. It is the second largest terrace field hockey stadium in the world.

Important tournaments held here include Indira Gandhi International Gold Cup, Asian School Hockey, National School Games Twice, All India Women Festival, Indo-Uzabekistak 1977, Indo Pan American Hockey 1995, All India Hockey Tournaments, and Punjab Gold Cup.

It later served as the home ground for World Series Hockey's local franchise, Chandigarh Comets.
