= List of foreign Premier Hockey League players =

This is a list of foreign players in the Premier Hockey League, which commenced play in 2005. The following players must meet the following criteria:

1. Have played at least one League game. Players who were signed by Premier League clubs.

== Argentina ==
- Jorge Lombi – Hyderabad Sultans – 2006
- Mario Almada – Orissa Steelers – 2007

== Australia ==
- Paul Blake – Bangalore Hi-fliers – 2007
- Lloyd Scott – Chandigarh Dynamos – 2007
- Jamie Dwyer – Maratha Warriors – 2007
- Albert Casas – Chennai Veerans – 2007
- Brent Livermore – Maratha Warriors – 2007

== Malaysia ==
- Kuhan Shanmugunathan – Bangalore Hi-fliers- 2005, Chennai Veerans – 2007
- Azlan Bakar – Sher-e-Jalandhar- 2005

== Netherlands ==
- Sebastian Westerhout – Hyderabad Sultans – 2007
- Oscar ter Weeme – Hyderabad Sultans – 2008
- Thijs de Greeff – Bangalore Hi-fliers – 2007
- Sander Van Der Weide – Bangalore Hi-fliers – 2007
- Olivier Rutgers – Bangalore Hi-fliers – 2008
- Sebastian Westerhout – Bangalore Hi-fliers – 2008
- Lodewijk de Bruijn – Maratha Warriors – 2006
- Balder Bomans – Chandigarh Dynamos – 2006
- Timo Bruinsma – Chandigarh Dynamos – 2007
- Tjeerd Steller – Orissa Steelers – 2007
- Don Prins – Sher-e-Jalandhar – 2008
- Melchior Looijen – Maratha Warriors – 2008
- Huib Zwerver – Chandigarh Dynamos – 2008
- Cesco Van Der Vliet – Chennai Veerans – 2008
- Eric-Jan Iding – Chennai Veerans – 2008
- Joost van den Bogart – Chennai Veerans – 2008

== New Zealand ==
- Bevan Hari – Sher-e-Jalandhar – 2006

== Pakistan ==
- Waseem Ahmed – Hyderabad Sultans – 2005
- Sohail Abbas – Hyderabad Sultans – 2005
- Ahmed Alam – Hyderabad Sultans – 2005
- Salman Akbar – Hyderabad Sultans – 2006
- Shakeel Abbasi – Hyderabad Sultans – 2006–2007
- Dilawar Hussain – Chennai Veerans – 2005
- Kashif Jawwad – Maratha Warriors – 2005
- Mudassar Ali Khan – Bangalore Hi-fliers – 2005–2006
- Zeeshan Ashraf – Chennai Veerans – 2005, Chandigarh Dynamos – 2007
- Eric Raza – Maratha Warriors – 2005
- Mohammad Saqlain – Maratha Warriors – 2005–2006
- Muhammad Sarwar – Sher-e-Jalandhar- 2005
- Rehan Butt – Bangalore Lions – 2006
- Andan Zakir – Maratha Warriors – 2006, Orissa Steelers – 2007
- Imran Warsi – Maratha Warriors – 2006–2007
- Mohammad Shabbir – Chandigarh Dynamos – 2006
- Sajjad Anwar – Chandigarh Dynamos – 2007
- Muhammed Zubair – Maratha Warriors – 2007
- Ehsan Ullah – Maratha Warriors – 2007
- Salman Akbar – Sher-e-Jalandhar – 2008
- Dilawar Hussain – Sher-e-Jalandhar – 2008
- Ghazanfar Ali – Chandigarh Dynamos -2008
- Kamran Ahmed – Orissa Steelers – 2008
- Adnan Maqsood – Orissa Steelers – 2008

== South Korea ==
- Hyo Kim – Bangalore Hi-fliers – 2008
- Kang Moon Kweon – Maratha Warriors – 2008

== Spain ==
- Juan Pablo Escarre – Chennai Veerans – 2005
- Pau Quemada – Sher-e-Jalandhar – 2006
- Jordi Quintana – Bangalore Lions – 2006
- Ramón Alegre – Hyderabad Sultans – 2007

== See also ==
- Premier Hockey League
