= 2007 Premier Hockey League =

The 2007 Premier Hockey League Season was the third season of the Premier Hockey League, and was played in two phases in Chennai and Chandigarh. 7 teams participated: Orissa Steelers, Sher-e-Jalandhar, Bangalore Lions, Hyderabad Sultans, Maratha Warriors, Chandigarh Dynamos and Chennai Veerans. Orissa Steelers won the title in 2007. Sher-e-Jalandhar was the runners up. Bangalore Lions beat Hyderabad Lions to finish third.

== Teams ==
Orissa Steelers won the PHL 2007 against Sher-e-Jalandhar by beating them by 4–3 in third final.

The organisers announced a number of changes for the 2007 edition, including the elimination of tier 2, meaning all teams will play on the same tier, and the reduction of the number of teams from 11 to 7. The Delhi Dazzlers, Bengal Tigers, Lucknow Nawabs, and Imphal Rangers were dropped for the 2007 season.

=== Tier-1 ===
- Bangalore Lions
- Chandigarh Dynamos
- Hyderabad Sultans
- Sher-e-Jalandhar
- Orissa Steelers
- Maratha Warriors
- Chennai Veerans
