= 2005 Premier Hockey League =

Debut season of the Premier Hockey League

The 2005 Premier Hockey League Season was the debut season of the Premier Hockey League, and was held in Hyderabad, India. Five teams participated in this season: Hyderabad Sultans, Sher-e-Jalandhar, Bangalore Lions, Maratha Warriors and Chennai Veerans. The title was won by Hyderabad Sultans led by Dilip Tirkey, and Chandigarh Dynamos got promotion to premier division as Chennai Veerans were relegated.

== Results ==
- Hyderabad Sultans Champions of 2005.They topped the league table.
- Chennai Veerans relegated to Tier-2
- Chandigarh Dynamos promoted to Tier-1- PHL Player of the season- G. Mann
