= 2006 Premier Hockey League =

The 2006 Premier Hockey League Season was the second season of the Premier Hockey League. Bangalore Lions won the PHL in its second year beating Chandigarh dynamos with drag-flick specialist Len Aiyappa scoring a hattrick in the third final. Of the best of three finals, Lions won the first 4–2. Dynamos draw parity by winning the next 3–2. and Lions sealed the issue with a 2–1 win in the third final where Hari Prasad scored a double.

Bangalore Lions Team after winning the PHL in 2006

== Results ==
- Bangalore Lions Champion of 2006. They defeated Chandigarh Dynamos in a best of three final series
- Maratha Warriors relegated to Tier-2
- Orissa Steelers promoted to Tier-1
