= 2008 Premier Hockey League =

2008 PHL: Bangalore Hi-Fliers win title

The 2008 Premier Hockey League Season was the fourth, and most recent season of the Premier Hockey League. It was won by Bangalore Hi-Fliers who took home prize money of Rs. 4 million. Chandigarh Dynamos finished second and Hyderabad Sultans ended up on third place.

== Results ==
Bangalore Hi-fliers won the PHL 2008 against Chandigarh Dynamos, beating them by 2–1 in best of 3 finals.

- In 1st final Chandigarh Dyanamos made 3–2 against Bangalore Hi-fliers at the end of full-time.
- In 2nd final Bangalore had come back with 4–2 win against Dyanmos, which gave full hope to team for the last final.
- In the nerve breaking final match, Bangalore gave no chance to Dyanamos to take the direction of the play. It made 2–1 win to head home with title for 2nd time, through 4 editions of the play.
- Hyderabad Sultans and Orissa Steelers reached semi finals in play-off
- The league was won Bangalore Lions and the Chandigarh Dynamos were the runners-up.
