= World Series Hockey =

Indian field hockey league

Bridgestone World Series Hockey
- Founded: 2011
- First season: 2012
- Administrator: Indian Hockey Federation
- No. of teams: 8
- Country: India
- Headquarters: Mumbai, Maharashtra, India
- Most recent champion: Sher-e-Punjab (1st title)
- Most titles: Sher-e-Punjab (1 title)
- Tournament format: Double Round-robin and Knock-out

World Series Hockey (WSH) was a professional league for field hockey competition in India. It was organised by Indian Hockey Federation with the objective to reinvigorate hockey in India. It was contested among eight franchise-based teams consisting of players from India and around the world. The entire event took place on home and away basis culminating into multi header playoffs. Australian Dennis Meredith, a member of the FIH panel of tournament directors, was the technical director of the WSH. It was sponsored by tyre manufacturers, Bridgestone, and therefore officially known as Bridgestone World Series Hockey.

== History ==
=== First season ===
The inaugural season of WSH was to take place from 17 December 2011 to 22 January 2012, but later was postponed owing to Olympic qualifiers. It kicked off on 29 February amidst confusion and controversies when the Indian players opted out of the tournament and FIH, HI and PHF warned players looking to participate in the WSH that they will be suspended from international matches as the event was unsanctioned.

A total of 59 matches were played in 34 days. The top four teams in the league phase advanced to the semi-finals followed by the final which was played in Mahindra Hockey Stadium, Mumbai. Sher-e-Punjab defeated Pune Strykers 5 – 2 to become the champions of the first WSH.

=== Second season ===
The second season of World Series Hockey was supposed to be played from 15 December 2012 to 20 January 2013.

== Competition format ==
=== Rules ===
The event was played according to the traditional hockey rules, apart from a few variations. All the matches were of 70 minutes, but instead of two-halves, the games are divided into four-quarters of 17-and-a-half minutes, to give more rest to players, and provide opportunities to sponsors and advertisers. Each team could have a maximum of 25 registered players, out of which 18 played. Time-outs (2 minutes) could be called once in each half. There were video umpires in all games. In the event that the referral is upheld, the referring team would retain its right. A penalty stroke was awarded in case of an intentional foul. The shoot-outs are used only in the knockout stage.

=== League phase ===
Each team played the other twice; home and away. Top four teams qualify for the semi-finals. If at the end of the league phase two or more teams have the same number of points, these teams will be ranked according to the following criteria:

1. Respective number of matches won
2. Higher number of wins
3. Goal difference
4. Number of goals scored
5. Head to head record
6. Shoot‐out competition

=== Playoffs ===
The four teams with the best record after the league phase qualify for the playoffs. The winners of each playoff semis qualifies for the final.

== Franchises ==
Team name	City	Home ground	Owner(s)	Captain	Head coach
Bhopal Badshahs	Bhopal	Aishbagh Stadium	Dainik Bhaskar	Sameer Dad	Vasudevan Bhaskaran
Chandigarh Comets	Chandigarh	Sector 42 Stadium		Rehan Butt	Harendra Singh
Chennai Cheetahs	Chennai	Mayor Radhakrishnan Stadium	Chennai Sports Organisers Pvt. Ltd.	Brent Livermore	Jose Brasa
Delhi Wizards	Delhi	Dhyan Chand National Stadium	Wizcraft International Entertainment Pvt. Ltd	Shakeel Abbasi	Darryl D'Souza
Karnataka Lions	Bangalore	Bangalore Hockey Stadium	Sporting Ace Pvt. Ltd. (Zentrum Group)	Arjun Halappa	Jude Felix
Mumbai Marines	Mumbai	Mahindra Hockey Stadium	Ashish Bharatram (SRF Group) and Harish Thawani (Nimbus)	Adrian D'Souza	Andrew Meredith
Pune Strykers	Pune	PCMC Hockey Stadium	Sai Grace Sports & Events Pvt. Ltd.	Ken Pereira	Gundeep Singh
Sher-e-Punjab	Jalandhar	Surjeet Hockey Stadium		Prabhjot Singh	Rajinder Singh

== Players ==
Each team could have a maximum of 25 registered players. The tournament included Pakistani superstar and legend Waseem Ahmed along with seven other Pakistani players. The players were finalized on 28 November and 10 February based on the draft system. The captains of eight teams were announced at a media conference and the list includes four Indian players and four foreign players. WSH signed on eight world-renowned coaches to take charge of the teams.

== Trophy ==
Trophy of Bridgestone World Series Hockey comprised a large cup with two hockey sticks on either sides. The trophy was unveiled by actor Saif Ali Khan, Viren Rasquinha, Prabhjot Singh, Arjun Halappa and Rajpal Singh at a press conference in Mumbai.

== Sponsorship ==
Tyre manufacturers Bridgestone became the title sponsors of World Series Hockey for the inaugural season. Other major sponsors of the league included Vodafone and Seagram's Imperial Blue.

== Prize money ==
The prize money for WSH was at the time the highest prize money for any hockey event in the world, 30 times more than the Euro Hockey League. The total prize money was excess of 100 million Indian rupees.

Final positions
Position	Prize money
Champions	₹ 40 million (US$ 800,000)
Runners-up	₹ 20 million (US$ 400,000)
Third place	₹ 10 million (US$ 200,000)
Fourth place	₹ 10 million (US$ 200,000)
Individual Prizes
Award	Prize money
WSH Rockstar (most valuable player)	₹ 10 million (US$ 200,000)
Indian Super Star (star Indian Player)	₹ 5 million (US$ 100,000)
Golden Stick (highest goal scorer)	₹ 2.5 million (US$ 50,000)
Game Changer (best midfielder, defender or goalkeeper)	₹ 2.5 million (US$ 50,000)
Rookie of the Year (under 21)	₹ 1 million (US$ 20,000)

If an Indian player becomes WSH Rockstar, the prize for the Indian Superstar will be awarded to the next best Indian player. All WSH franchises have committed to share a minimum of 50% of their team winnings with the players.

== Brand ambassador ==
Bollywood actor Suniel Shetty is appointed as the brand ambassador for the World Series Hockey.

== Statistics ==
Season	Date	Final				Man of the tournament
Season	Date	Venue	Champions	Result	Runners-up	Man of the tournament
2012	2 April 2012	Mahindra Hockey Stadium, Mumbai	Sher-e-Punjab	5 – 2	Pune Strykers	(India) Gurjinder Singh (CCO) (19 goals in 15 matches)

=== Performance of teams ===
Team	Matches	Won	Drawn	Lost	For	Against	Win%	Best	Titles
Sher-e-Punjab	16	10	1	5	54	38	66.67%	Champions	1
Pune Strykers	16	7	3	6	47	51	53.85%	Runners-up	0
Chandigarh Comets	15	9	1	5	50	38	64.29%	Semi-finalists	0
Karnataka Lions	15	7	0	8	35	44	46.67%	Semi-finalists	0
Delhi Wizards	14	6	1	7	36	37	46.15%	5th of 8	0
Chennai Cheetahs	14	6	1	7	41	43	46.15%	6th of 8	0
Bhopal Badshahs	14	5	2	7	32	37	41.67%	7th of 8	0
Mumbai Marines	14	4	1	9	32	39	30.77%	8th of 8	0

=== Top scorers ===
All-time top scorers in the World Series Hockey (WSH goals only)
Rank	Player	Team	Goals
1	(India) Gurjinder Singh	CCO	19
1	(Pakistan) Syed Imran Warsi	CCH	19
3	(India) Len Aiyappa	KL	13
4	(India) Deepak Thakur	SP	12
4	(India) Gurpreet Singh	PS	12
4	(India) Vikramjit Singh	DW	12
7	(India) Prabhjot Singh	SP	10
7	(Canada) Gabbar Singh	CCO	10
9	(India) Adam Sinclair	CCH	9
10	(Pakistan) Shakeel Abbasi	DW	8

The top goal scorer of the league is awarded with golden stick and a prize money of ₹ 2.5 million (US$ 25,000). Apart from this, ₹ 5,000 is given to the players for the goal of the match. Champion team Sher-e-Punjab holds the record for most goals scored (54 in 16 matches). Delhi Wizards and Bhopal Badshahs have conceded the fewest goals (37 in 14 matches).

The highest-scoring matches to date in the World Series Hockey occurred twice: Pune Strykers beat Mumbai Marines and Delhi defeated Punjab. Both the matches ended up 7–5. Out of Pune's 7 goals, 5 were scored by Gurpreet Singh, which is also the most goals scored in a WSH match by an individual.

== Technical committee ==
The technical committee for World Series Hockey included Dennis Meredith, former Indian coach Joaquim Carvolho, former captain and one of the best goalkeepers of India Ashish Ballal, former chairman of the International Hockey Federation umpiring committee Peter Von Reth, M.P. Ganesh, Shahbaz Ahmed and Zafar Iqbal.

1996 Atlanta Olympics Indian goalkeeper Alloysius Edwards was chosen as one of the managers of the World Series Hockey, whereas sports medicine expert P. S. M. Chandran, involved with multiple sports at the international level for more than three decades, was elected as chief medical officer.

== Controversies ==
The IHF has not been recognised by the International Hockey Federation as the governing body for the sport in India. Instead, the FIH recognises Hockey India as the sole national governing body for the sport. It remained an unsanctioned event as per the FIH statutes.

Pakistan Hockey Federation (PHF) has said that any player who participates in the WSH will be banned from domestic competitions. FIH wrote a letter to PHF which clearly stated that the league is unsanctioned and its players would not take part. Earlier, the FIH had stated that those who had signed their contracts before 28 March 2011 could play in the league, but situation has changed. Apart from Rehan, Zeeshan Ashraf, Mudassar Ali, Tariq Aziz, Adnan Maqsood, Waseem Ahmed, Syed Imran Warsi and Shakeel Abbasi were signed to play in WSH.

FIH president Leandro Negre served a direct warning to players looking to participate in the WSH that they will be suspended from international matches. The entire Indian squad signed a contract to play in the league but Negre made it clear that any Indian player who participates will be banned from the Olympic qualifiers and all FIH tournaments.

Former Indian coach Harendra Singh criticized the FIH and Hockey India over interfering in a domestic tournament and stopping players from participating in the WSH. According to him, playing matches is more beneficial for the players than attending camps for the Olympic qualifiers.

On 30 November, six top Indian players pulled out of the league in favor of the national camp for the Olympic qualifiers. In a letter, addressed to Hockey India secretary Narinder Batra and signed by skipper Bharat Chettri, Tushar Khandekar, Yuvraj Walmiki, Sreejesh, Sandeep Singh and Sardar Singh, the players said they would be available for selection. The WSH, however, said that they were yet to get communication from any WSH player regarding their non-availability for the inaugural edition.

On 1 December, six more Indian players pulled out of the World Series Hockey, citing national camp that would coincide with the league start. The six players - Rupinder Pal Singh, Danish Mujtaba, Kangujam Chinglensana Singh, Manjeet Kullu, Birendra Lakra and Manpreet Singh - in a letter assured the Hockey India that they would attend the national camp.

Sources claimed that coach requested Hockey India to postpone camp from 11 December to sometime in January so that national players can feature in inaugural World Series Hockey. Organisers of the WSH have said they are open to postponing the event by three months, till after the Olympic Qualification tournament. The organisers postponed the event with condition of written guarantee from HI and an assurance that they will allow all the players to participate in the tournament after the qualifiers.

The tournament got clearance from Delhi High Court on 13 February, adding that the schedule did not clash with international commitments of the national team.

18 players of the Indian team that qualified for the Olympics decided to skip the league after a team meeting. International Hockey Federation said that it can sanction the WSH only if the two organisations, Hockey India and Indian Hockey Federation, reach an agreement.

== Media ==
=== Broadcast rights ===
Country	Broadcaster	Internet
India	NEO Sports; NEO Prime	YouTube (worldwide)
Pakistan	GEO Super	

== See also ==
- Premier Hockey League
- Hockey in India
- India men's national field hockey team
- India women's national field hockey team
