= Dilip Tirkey =

Former Indian field hockey player And Politician

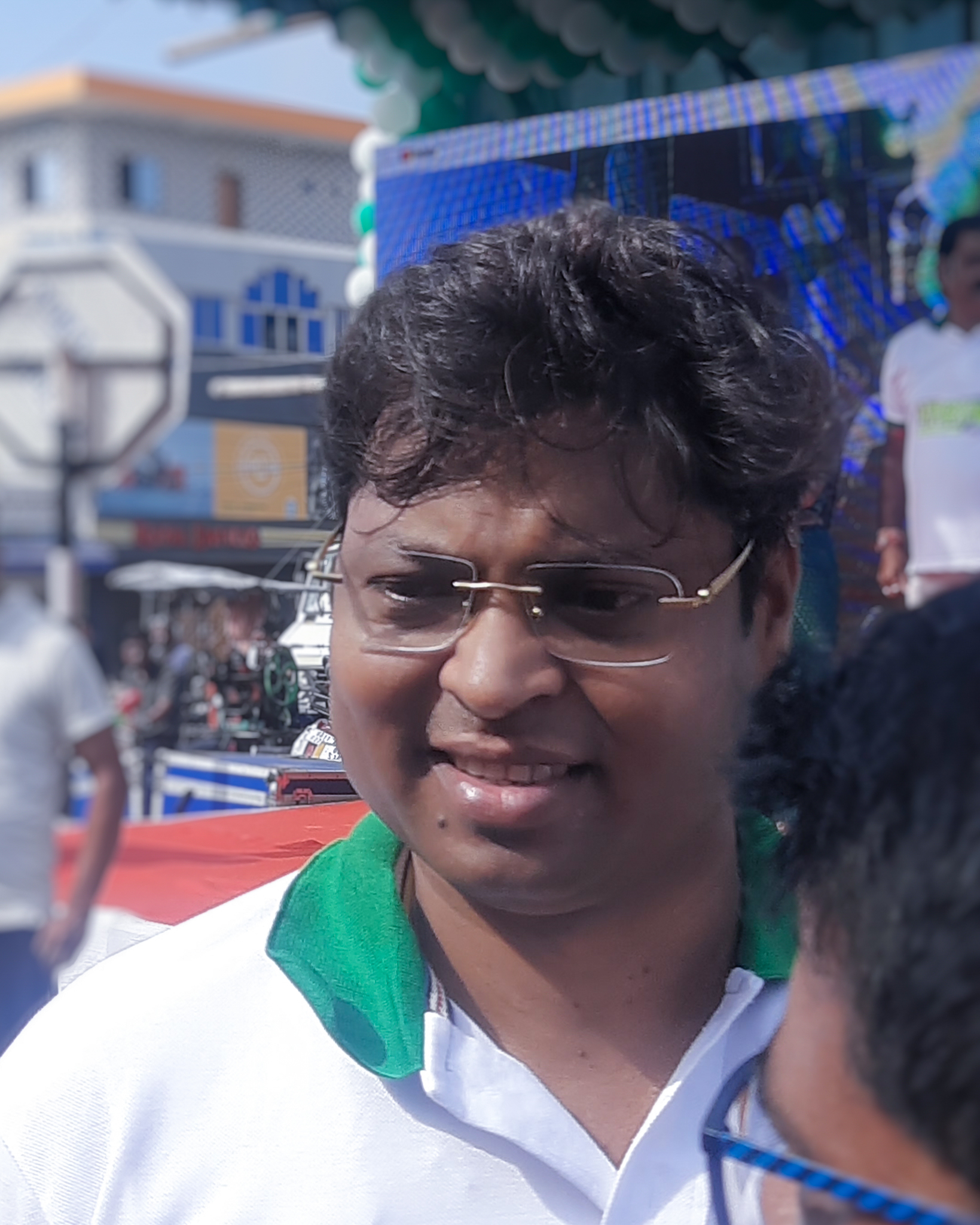

Member of parliament of Rajya Sabha
- In office 4 April 2012 – 3 April 2018
- Succeeded by: Prasanta Nanda, BJD
- Constituency: Odisha

Personal details
- Born: 25 November 1977 (age 48) Saunamara, Sundergarh, Orissa, India

President of Hockey India
- In office 23 September 2022 – Incumbent
- Preceded by: Gyanendro Ningombam

Medal record

Representing India

Men's field hockey

Asian Games
Gold medal – first place	1998 Bangkok	Team
Silver medal – second place	2002 Busan	Team

Asia Cup
Gold medal – first place	2003 Kuala Lumpur	
Gold medal – first place	2007 Chennai	
Bronze medal – third place	1999 Kuala Lumpur	

Dilip Tirkey (born 25 November 1977) is an Indian politician and former captain of the Indian field hockey team and sports administrator . He was awarded Padma Shree in 2004. Currently he is the president of Hockey India.

== Personal life ==
Tirkey was born in a Kurukh (Oraon) tribal family in Saunamara village of Sundargarh, Orissa on 25 November 1977. His parents are Regina and Vincent Tirkey, a former CRPF hockey player. His twin younger brothers Anoop Tirkey and Ajit Tirkey play for Indian Railways. He is married to Mamta Tirkey. He was appointed as the Deputy Manager at Air India (Bhubaneswar) in 1996. His family follows Roman Catholicism.

== Career highlights ==
He made his debut in 1995 against England. He represented India at the 1996 Atlanta, 2000 Sydney and 2004 Athens Olympics and had a total of 412 international caps. He is the only tribal hockey player to represent India in three Olympics. In 2002, Tirkey was made captain of the team, becoming the first tribal to captain the Indian hockey team in the post-independence era. He captained the team that won silver at the 2002 Asian Games and gold at the 2003 Afro-Asian Games. He was also a part of the team that won the gold at the Bangkok Asian Games in 1998 and won the 2003 Asia Cup held in Malaysia. He Captained Indian Hockey Team at the 2006 Men's Hockey World Cup in Germany. and also played the 1998 World Cup at Netherlands and 2002 World Cup at Malaysia. He was Captain of Indian Hockey Team at 2004 Athens Olympics.

On 2 May 2010, Tirkey announced his retirement from international competition. Tirkey played as a defender for the Indian national field hockey team and was regarded by some commentators as among the leading defenders of his era. He has been described as the first player to appear in 400 international matches. In Sundergarh, Tirkey is recognised for his sporting career.

== Career ==
His former playing position was of full back. He was best known for his penalty corner hit. Dilip was one of the most difficult defenders (because of his tight marking skill near goal post) to beat in the world and was known as "The Wall of Indian Hockey" He was an ex-captain of Indian hockey team. The first and only Hockey player from India to play more than 400 international matches Dilip Tirkey was the Former Captain of the Indian Hockey Team. Having played 412 international matches for India, Dilip Tirkey has represented India in 3 Olympic Games & was Captain of the Indian Hockey Team at the 2004 Summer Olympics at Athens. Under his captaincy, India clinched gold medal at the 2003 Afro-Asian Games by defeating arch-rivals Pakistan in the Final. The First-ever Tribal to receive Padma Shri Award, Dilip Tirkey is a former member of parliament of India in Rajya Sabha, former chairman of Odisha Tourism Development Corporation (OTDC), Chairman of Odisha Hockey Promotion Council & Hockey Odisha's ad-hoc committee. In September 2022, he became President of Hockey India. On 22 March 2012, he was elected unopposed to the Rajya Sabha as one of the three Biju Janata Dal (BJD) candidates to the Upper House of Indian Parliament. Previously, Dilip Tirkey was working as chairman of Odisha Tourism Development Corporation (OTDC), now he is working as the chairman of Odisha Hockey Promotion Council. In September 2022, he was elected unopposed to the position of the president of Hockey India. He is the first ever international hockey player to become President of Hockey India Dilip Tirkey Sports Research Development Foundation short and abbreviated as DTSRD is an initiative of Padma Shri Dilip Tirkey. DTSRD has its registered office in Bhubaneswar, Odisha. Dibakar Parichha serves as the Secretary-General of DTSRD while Prime Abhilas is the managing director of DTSRD. The Founder – President of DTSRD is Dilip Tirkey Career as administrator

He declined to become a national selector on 16 July 2010, three days after he was offered the post by the Indian Hockey Federation. In three Olympics he has participated his penalty corner hitting is considered as one of the best in the world. He has a total of 412 international caps and has scored over 60 goals in his international career. Under the Captaincy of Dilip Tirkey Orissa Steelers team won the 2007 edition of Premier Hockey League. He was awarded Player of Tournament in PHL 2007. In 2005 Hyderabad Sultans won the inaugural season of Premier Hockey League under Captaincy of Dilip Tirkey. He was also named the Player of Tournament in first edition of PHL. In 2005 Dilip Tirkey led the team Sindh Qalandars that won the inaugural season of Pakistan's SHL (Super Hockey League). Dilip Tirkey was among the few Indian players who played in Pakistan's SHL

== Dilip Tirkey Sports Research Development Foundation ==
Dilip Tirkey Sports Research Development Foundation (DTSRD) was initiated by Dilip Tirkey. Dibakar Parichha & Prime Abhilas serve as Secretary-General and managing director of DTSRD. DTSRD organized a Six-a-side Hockey Fest for village teams at eight centers in Sundergarh & Bhubaneswar in 2010. In 2016, Dilip Tirkey Sports Research and Development Foundation organized one of the largest hockey tournaments in the world, The Biju Patnaik Rural Hockey Championships, for the tribals of Odisha, Jharkhand, and Chhattisgarh which was inaugurated by the vice president of India Mohammad Hamid Ansari and Odisha Chief Minister Naveen Patnaik. The tournament comprised over 22,000 players, and 1500 teams from 900 villages, which was a Guinness world record. The objective of the tournament was to bring about a sports culture in the Naxal-infested regions and ensure that the tribal youth pick up hockey sticks and not guns.

Speaking at the inauguration of the Tournament, Vice President of India, Hamid Ansari said, "I've never seen such a gathering of players of a single sport. This is remarkable. I am sure the Odisha Government initiative will not go in vain". Renowned sand artist Sudarsan Pattnaik and former Indian hockey team captain, Padma Shri awardee Ignace Tirkey were the brand ambassadors of this Biju Patnaik Rural Hockey Championship that took place under the aegis of Dilip Tirkey Sports Research and Development Foundation.

DTSRD has also taken initiatives to develop sports infrastructure by getting an artificial hockey pitch laid in Saunamara village of Sundergarh district. This hockey field is sand-based, which required far less maintenance, especially when it came to watering the pitch. DTSRD has made efforts to infuse sports culture in youngsters of Saunamara village at Sundergarh which is known as the hockey village. Hockey is a hereditary game here. Sounamara has a great contribution towards Hockey with legend Dilip Tirkey, Bikash Toppo, Bipin Kerketta, Subhadra Pradhan, Dipsan Tirkey, and Amit Rohidas coming from this village.

Sundergarh has become the 'Cradle of Indian Hockey'. The region has produced hockey players like Dilip Tirkey, Ignace Tirkey, Prabodh Tirkey, Lazarus Barla, Birendra Lakra, Amit Rohidas, Jyoti Sunita Kullu, Sunita Lakra, Deep Grace Ekka, William Xalco, Roshan Minz among others. Sundergarh now has three hockey academies which include a sports hostel in Panposh. To further strengthen the hockey ecosystem in Sundergarh, Odisha is also planning to lay a synthetic hockey turf in each of the 17 blocks of the district

== Political career ==
After his retirement, Dilip Tirkey, by far Odisha's most successful sportsman, was a candidate waiting to be picked up by political parties. The ruling Biju Janata Dal in 2012 nominated him as their choice for Rajya Sabha MP. In 2012 Dilip Tirkey became a Member of Parliament, Rajya Sabha from Odisha representing Biju Janata Dal party. In 2014 he contested Lok Sabha elections on BJD ticket from Sundergarh constituency. In 2014 BJD appointed him as parliamentary party leader in Rajya Sabha. In 2018 Chief Minister Naveen Patnaik appointed Dilip Tirkey as Chairman of Odisha Tourism Development Corporation (OTDC) to promote tourism in the state Dilip Tirkey represented the state of Odisha in the upper house of Parliament from 22 March 2012, to April 2018. Ironically, mostly quiet throughout his life, he raised his voice in the Parliament, asking a total of 389 questions, higher than the national average of 344 and the state average of 374. He did use this opportunity to campaign for a Bharat Ratna for the legendary hockey player Dhyan Chand.

== Electoral History ==
2014 Indian general elections: Sundargarh
Party	Candidate	Votes	%	±%
BJP	Jual Oram	340,508	33.69	
BJD	Dilip Tirkey	3,21,679	31.83	
INC	Hemananda Biswal	2,69,335	26.65	
NOTA	None of the above	15,835	1.57	−
SUCI(C)	Jastin Lugun	9,472	0.94	
BSP	Bagi Lakra	9,460	0.94	
Majority		18,829	1.86	−
Turnout		10,10,723	71.66	
BJP gain from INC				

2024 Indian general election: Sundargarh
Party	Candidate	Votes	%	±%
BJP	Jual Oram	494,282	42.77	
BJD	Dilip Kumar Tirkey	3,55,474	30.76	
INC	Janardan Dehury	2,61,986	22.67	
NOTA	None of the above	17,801	1.51	
Majority		1,38,808	12.01	
Turnout		11,59,760	73.44	
BJP hold				

== Sports Administrator ==
In 2021 Dilip Tirkey was appointed as the chairman of newly formed Ad hoc Committee to manage the sport of Hockey in Odisha. He also served as Chairman of Odisha Hockey Promotion Council. In 2022 he became the first player to head Hockey India. He was elected unopposed as the new president of Hockey India for a tenure of four years.

== Golf ==
Being 'The Wall of Indian hockey' for long Dilip Tirkey turned professional in Golf in 2020, made his debut at the Golconda Masters 2020 He featured in the Qualifying School in Ahmedabad and then competed at the Golconda Masters in Hyderabad, and the Players Championship in Bengaluru.

== In popular culture ==
In 2010 Dilip Tirkey made his acting debut in Cinema of Odisha by playing a role in Ollywood movie Toro Moro Katha Heba Chup Chap. He had another Odia film in pipeline named as "Kotia Swapna". In 2018 a Biographical film, Biopic on Dilip Tirkey was declared. Actor turned politician Anubhav Mohanty was supposed to play the role of Dilip Tirkey in this Biopic. In 2014 a thesis titled "Dilip Tirkey – The Wall of Defence in Field Hockey" was submitted by a scholar of Lakshmibai National Institute of Physical Education for the degree of Doctor of Philosophy in Physical Education. In 2019 Dilip Tirkey was listed in the Odisha Power List: Top 50 High & Mighty. Captain of Indian Hockey Team Amit Rohidas whose inspiration is Dilip Tirkey had commented that "Dilip Tirkey has inspired my village to look at Hockey as engine of change". In 2005 and 2006, Dilip Tirkey was invited by the club Klein Zwitserland to play in the Dutch field Hockey League, one of the game's most competitive leagues in the world. Dilip Tirkey endorsed a regional Odia cable network "Ortel Communications" as its brand ambassador. He was also brand ambassador for a chain of stores run by the state-run handloom cooperative. In Odisha Premier League (OPL) a professional Twenty-20 cricket tournament of the Odisha Cricket Association, Dilip Tirkey was the Brand Ambassador of Cricket team Bhubaneswar Jaguars. Dilip Tirkey was the chief mentor, technical director and advisor of Kalinga Lancers, a field hockey team that became Champions in the 2017 edition of Hockey India League

== Awards and honours ==
- Padma Shree, 2004
- Arjun Award, 2002
- Ekalavya Award, 1996
- ONGC-Hockey Year Book Award, 1998
- Biju Patnaik Sportsperson of the Year Award, 2004
- Ricoh Hockey Star of the Year, 2009
- Showcase Odisha Awards, 2012
- Awarded for Excellence in Sports (Hockey) at 2nd edition of UDAAN by Zee Hindustan, 2022

=== Honours ===
- Included in the Junior World XI in 1997
- Included in the Asian XI in 2002
- Selected for World All-Star team in 2006
- Only Indian to be selected for World All-Star team in 2007
- Received the 2nd Ricoh Hockey Star of the Year Award in Bhubaneswar on 6 July 2010
- Received the honorary Doctorate from Sambalpur University on 15 July 2010
- Received the Odisha Living Legend Award from Orissadiary.com on 11 Nov 2011
- In 2009 the Hockey Stadium at National Institute of Technology (NIT) Rourkela is named after Dilip Tirkey as Dilip Tirkey Hockey Stadium
- A road from Sundergarh Govt. College Bridge to New Bus stand has been named as DR. DILIP TIRKEY MARG
- A sports complex at Jajpur, Odisha is named after Dilip Tirkey as Dilip Tirkey Sports Complex
- A biographical book named Olympic Captain Dilip Tirkey is written by senior journalist K. Arumugam
- A stand & pavilion at the Saheed Sporting Cricket Ground in Bhubaneswar was named after Dilip Tirkey
- Hockey Stadium inside Kalinga Institute of Social Sciences named after Dilip Tirkey

== Achievements ==
- First-ever tribal to get Padma Shri Award
- India's highest capped (412 matches) hockey international and second highest in the world
- Only adivasi (tribal) to represent India in 3 Olympic Games
- 1995: 7th SAF Games at Madras (champions)
- 1996: Olympic Games at Atlanta, USA (8th place)
- 1997: Under-21 Test Series against Germany (winners)
- 1997: Under-21 Challengers Cup Tournament at Poznan, Poland (winners)
- 1997: Junior World Cup at Milton Keynes, England (runners-up)
- 1998: Asian Games at Bangkok (gold medal)
- 1999: Asia Cup at Kuala Lumpur (bronze medal)
- 2000: Olympic Games at Sydney (7th place)
- 2000: 10th Sultan Azlan Shah Cup Tournament at Kuala Lumpur (bronze medal)
- 2002: Champions Trophy at Cologne, Germany (4th place), as Captain
- 2002: Asian Games at Busan, South Korea (silver medal ), as Captain
- 2003: Asia Cup at Kuala Lumpur, Malaysia (champions)
- 2003: Afro-Asian Games at Hyderabad (gold medal), as Captain
- 2004: Olympic Games at Athens, Greece (7th place), as Captain
- 2011: Odisha Living Legend Award
