= Sukhbir Singh Gill =

Indian field hockey player (1975–2024)

Personal information
- National team: India
- Born: 14 December 1975 Chandigarh, India
- Died: 26 January 2024 (aged 48) Chandigarh, India
- Education: Panjab University

Sport
- Sport: Field hockey
- Position: Midfielder
- Team: Chandigarh Dynamos; India

Medal record

Representing India

Men's field hockey

Champions Challenge
Gold medal – first place	Kuala Lumpur 2001	Team

Sultan Azlan Shah Hockey Tournament
Gold medal – first place	Kuala Lumpur 1995	Team

Sukhbir Singh Gill (14 December 1975 – 26 January 2024) was an Indian field hockey midfielder, who made his international debut for the men's national team in 1995 during the Sultan Azlan Shah Hockey Tournament in Kuala Lumpur, Malaysia. Gill represented India at the 2000 Summer Olympics in Sydney, Australia, where the country finished in seventh place.

== Biography ==
Gill was born on 14 December 1975 in Chandigarh. He graduated from Shivalik Public School in Chandigarh and later from the DAV College in the same city. During his time at the university, he represented Panjab University. He also represented Chandigarh at the junior nationals. He made a debut with the India men's national team at the 1995 Sultan Azlan Shah Cup in Malaysia where the country emerged as the champions. He played as a midfielder. An obituary at Olympics.com called him a "crafty midfielder".

He represented the Indian men's national team at the 2000 Summer Olympics in Sydney, 2002 Hockey World Cup in Kuala Lumpur, and the 2002 Hockey Champions Trophy in Cologne. He was the first hockey player from the union territory of Chandigarh to represent the country at the Olympics.

Gill was diagnosed with a brain tumour in December 2006, but after undergoing a surgery he continued playing at tournaments including the 2007 Premier Hockey League representing the Chandigarh Dynamos. He also played the subsequent editions of the tournament with protective headgear. His teammates called him Thabad (transl. gutsy) referring to his resilience in continuing to play after his diagnosis. After his retirement, he continued to remain associated with the game, serving as a coach at a hockey academy at Shivalik Public school. He was employed with Bharat Petroleum.

Gill died on 26 January 2024 in Chandigarh, at the age of 48, 17 years after he was first diagnosed with a recurrent brain tumour. He had had multiple surgeries for his brain tumour, and had gone into a comatose state a few days prior to his death. He was married with two children.
