= Jugraj Singh =

Indian field hockey player

Personal information
- Born: 22 April 1983 (age 43) Punjab, India

Sport
- Sport: Field hockey
- Position: Fullback
Senior career
Years	Team	Caps	Goals
2005–2008	Chandigarh Dynamos	-	-
National team
Years	Team	Caps	Goals
2001–2003	India		-
Medal record
Men's field hockey
Representing India
Asian Games
Silver medal – second place	2002 Busan	Team
Junior World Cup
Gold medal – first place	2001 Hobart	Team

Jugraj Singh (born 22 April 1983) is a former Indian field hockey player whose playing career was cut short by a 2003 car accident. Born in 1983 to a Sikh family in Punjab, the former Punjab policeman was a self-coached, drag-flicker defender who later became a coach. A product of the Surjeet Singh Hockey Academy in Jalandhar and the Air India Hockey Academy in Delhi, Singh played left fullback for the Punjab Police team in Jalandhar; he made his international debut in the 2001 under-18 Asia Cup in Ipoh. Singh was not the only field-hockey player in his family; his aunt (father's sister) Rajbeer Kaur Rai is a former India captain and recipient of the Arjuna Award, and his brother-in-law Gurmail Singh played on the 1980 Olympic team. Singh played a pivotal role in taking Indian field hockey to a higher level by winning the Junior World Cup, the 2003 Indo-Pak Champions Trophy and the Asian Championship. He was considered to be the next Sohail Abbas by many experts; in a series against Pakistan, he performed so well that Abbas said he could see a younger version of himself in Singh.

After his accident Singh attempted a comeback on the national team; however, he never went further than the probables list despite playing for the Chandigarh Dynamos with a decent record in the PHL. He was given an opportunity to coach the junior national team for penalty corners at the national camp. Singh picked four players from that team, one of whom is the renowned drag-flicker Rupinder Pal Singh. "I did not achieve this overnight. My drag flick coach Jugraj has worked hard for that. I owe my success to him," Rupinder said. He added "Sohail Abbas is brilliant drag flicker. He has the world record against his name but if Jugraj did not meet with an accident in 2003, he might have been the record holder".

Singh is the penalty-corners coach of the Indian men's national team. With his coaching, India qualified for the London Olympics 2012 with Chief Coach Michael Nobbs. In the qualifiers, India's penalty-corner conversion ratio was very high because of Sandeep Singh and V. R. Raghunath. In the qualifying final, India defeated France 8–1. Of the eight goals, six (of seven attempts) were scored on penalty corners; five of the six penalty-corner goals were scored by Sandeep Singh.

== Playing career ==
Tournaments

- Junior Nationals, February 2001: Chennai
- National Games, December 2002: Hyderabad (1st place)
- Nehru Hockey Tournament, November 2002: Delhi (1st place)
- Beighton Cup, March–April 2002: Kolkata (1st place)
- Muruguppa Gold Cup (IHF Juniors), August 2001: Chennai (1st place)

Goals

- World Cup, February, March 2002, Kuala Lumpur (10th place): 3
- Champions Trophy, August 2003, Amstelveen (4th place): 4
- August–September 2002, Cologne (4th place): 5
- Asian Games, October 2002, Busan (2nd place): 4
- Champions Challenge, December 2001, Kuala Lumpur (1st place): 2
- Junior World Cup, October 2001, Hobart (1st place): 7
- Sub-Junior (u-18) Asia Cup, June 2001, Ipoh (1st place): 14 (captain, top scorer, MVP)
- Sultan Azlan Shah Cup, August 2001, Kuala Lumpur (5th place): 1
- Australian Tour, June 2003: 3
- Nation Tournament, Sydney (1st place): 2
- Adelaide-Melbourne, May–June 2002 (2nd in 4-Nation): 3
- European Tour, June 2003, Hamburg, 4-Nation Panasonic Masters (1st place): 1
- 4-Nation Tourney, August 2002, Amstelveen: 1
