= Wasim =

Wasim, Wassim or Waseem (Arabic: وسیم) is a masculine given name and surname of Arabic origin, meaning 'Handsome', 'Graceful' or 'Good-Looking'.

== Given name ==
- Abbas Wasim Efendi (1689–1760), Ottoman astronomer
- Abdul Waseem (born 1964), Pakistani politician
- Ahmed Waseem Razeek (born 1994), German footballer
- Syed Waseem Hussain (born 1972), Pakistani politician
- Waseem Abbas (born 1957), Pakistani actor
- Waseem Ahmed (disambiguation), multiple people
- Waseem Akhtar (born 1955), Pakistani politician
- Waseem Al-Bzour (born 1979), Jordanian football player
- Waseem Badami (born 1985), Pakistani journalist
- Waseem Bhatti (born 1978), French cricketer
- Waseem Shaikh (born 1984), South African actor
- Wasim (Guantanamo captive 338), Saudi detainee
- Wasim Abusal (born 2004), Palestinian boxer
- Wasim Akram (born 1966), Pakistani cricketer
- Wasim Barelvi (born 1940), Indian Urdu poet
- Wasim Bari (born 1948), Pakistani cricketer
- Wasim Haider (born 1967), Pakistani cricketer
- Wasim Jaffer (born 1978), Indian cricketer
- Wasim Jafri, Pakistani gastroenterologist
- Wasim Khan (born 1971), English cricketer
- Wasim Raja (1952–2006), Pakistani cricketer
- Wasim Sajjad (born 1941), Pakistani politician
- Wassim Almawi, Lebanese-American biochemist
- Wassim Doureihi, Australian Muslim religious activist
- Wassim El Banna (born 1979), Danish-Palestinian footballer
- Wassim Helal (born 1982), Tunisian handball goalkeeper
- Wassim Michael Haddad (born 1961), Lebanese-Greek-American mathematician
- Wassim Rezgui (born 1986), Tunisian footballer
- Wasim (actor) (1947–2021), Bangladeshi film actor

== Surname ==
- Imad Wasim (born 1988), British-Pakistani cricketer
- Mohammad Wasim (born 1978), Pakistani cricketer
- Muhammad Waseem (born 1989), Pakistani boxer
- Saira Wasim (born 1975), Pakistani artist
