= Sardara Singh =

Indian field hockey player

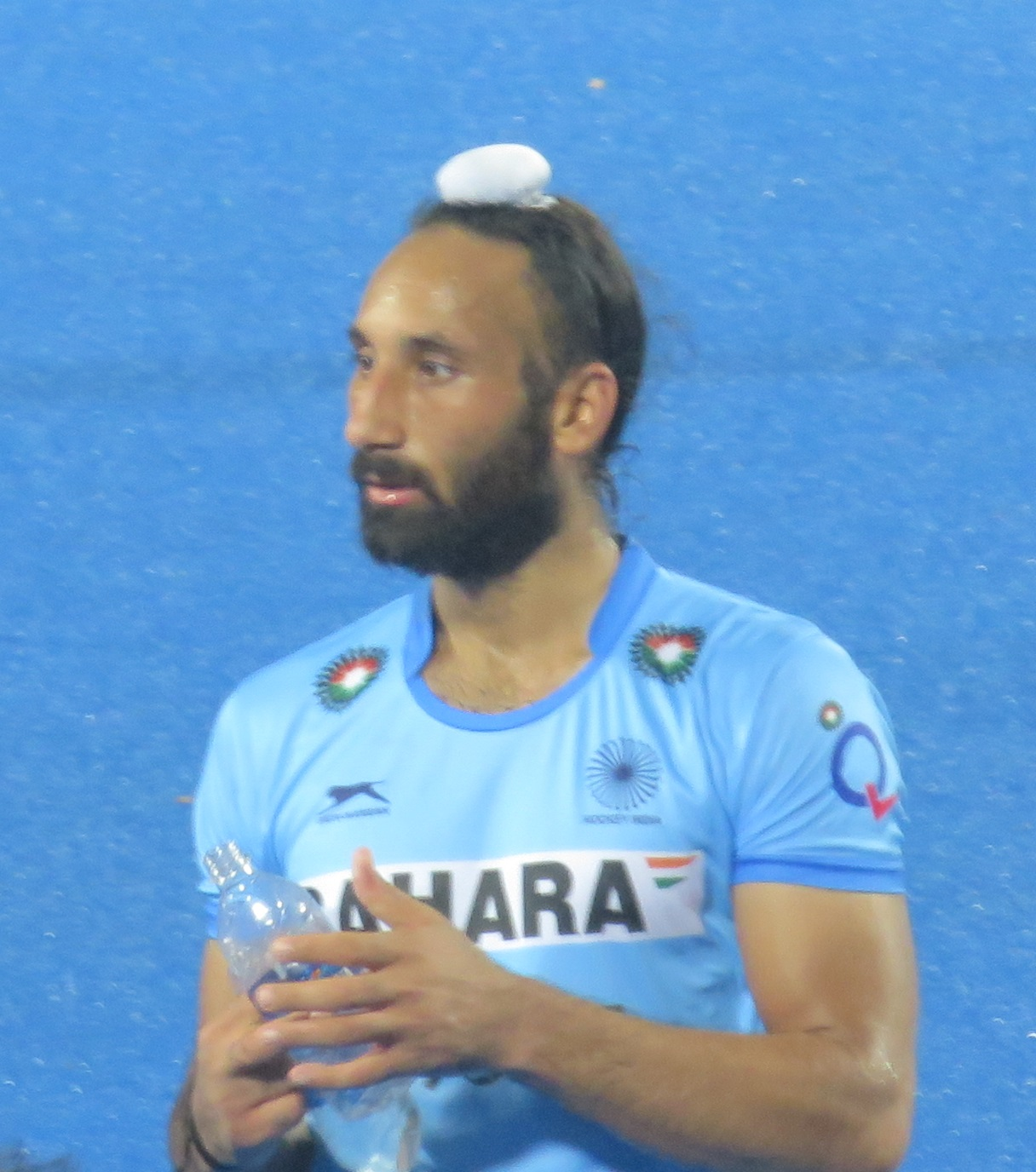
- Singh with India in 2014

Personal information
- Full name: Sardar Singh
- Born: 15 July 1986 (age 40) Santnagar, Sirsa, Haryana, India
- Height: 1.82 m (6 ft 0 in)

Sport
- Sport: Field hockey
- Position: Halfback
Senior career
Years	Team	Caps	Goals
2005	Chandigarh Dynamos	-	-
2006–2008	Hyderabad Sultans	-	-
2011	KHC Leuven	-	-
2013–2015	Delhi Waveriders	14	0
2013	HC Bloemendaal	0	0
2016	Punjab Warriors	-	-
National team
Years	Team	Caps	Goals
2006–2018	India	314	(16)
Coaching career
- 2022: India A
- 2023–: India U18
- 2026–: India U18 Hockey5's
Medal record
Men's field hockey
Representing India
Asian Games
Bronze medal – third place	2010 Guangzhou	Team
Gold medal – first place	2014 Incheon	Team
Bronze medal – third place	2018 Jakarta-Palembang	Team
Asia Cup
Gold medal – first place	2007 Chennai	Team
Silver medal – second place	2013 Ipoh	Team
Gold medal – first place	2017 Dhaka	Team
Champions Trophy
Silver medal – second place	2018 Breda	Team
Asian Champions Trophy
Silver medal – second place	2012 Doha	Team
Gold medal – first place	2016 Kuantan	Team
Commonwealth Games
Silver medal – second place	2010 Delhi	Team
Silver medal – second place	2014 Glasgow	Team
Hockey World League
Bronze medal – third place	2014–15 Raipur	Team

Sardara Singh (born 15 July 1986), sometimes referred as Sardar Singh, is an Indian field hockey coach and former field hockey player. He also served as the captain of the Indian national team. He usually plays the center half position. Sardara became the youngest player to captain the Indian team when he led the side at the 2008 Sultan Azlan Shah Cup. He was awarded Padma Shri, the fourth highest civilian award of India, in 2015. On 13 July 2016, the responsibilities of the captain were handed over from him to P. R. Sreejesh, the goalkeeper of Indian Team. On 12 September 2018, Sardara announced his retirement from international hockey. He played 314 matches during 12 years in his career.

== Early life ==
Sardara was born in Haryana's village Sant Nagar in Sirsa District to Gurnam Singh, a RMP doctor, and Jasveer Kaur, a housewife.

== Career ==
Sardara Singh made his debut for India in the junior team during India's 2003–04 tour of Poland. He made his senior debut against Pakistan in 2006. He also plays for his state of Haryana. He is a Deputy Superintendent Police Officer with the Haryana Police and plays for their team. Singh played for Chandigarh Dynamos in the inaugural season of the Premier Hockey League in 2005. He played for Hyderabad Sultans in the next three seasons till 2008, captaining the side.

His brother Didar Singh, a drag flick specialist also played for the Indian team, Haryana and Chandigarh Dynamos.

In 2010, he was included in the 18-men FIH All-Star team. In the same year, Singh was signed by the Belgian club, KHC Leuven to play in the Belgian Hockey League. In 2011, he was again named on the FIH All-Star team. Following Singh's impressive showing at the 2013 Asia Cup, he was signed by the Dutch club HC Bloemendaal as a replacement to Teun de Nooijer.

On 13 July 2016, the responsibilities of the captain were handed over from him to P. R. Sreejesh, the goalkeeper of Indian team. He has captained Indian team for 8 years.

He quit the sport in September 2018. In 2019, he was included in a 13-member Hockey India selection committee.

=== Hockey India League ===
Sardar Singh became the highest-paid marquee player at the inaugural Hockey India League auctions as the Delhi franchise bought him for US$78,000 (₹42,49,000). The Delhi team was named Delhi Waveriders. He captained his side to finish on second place in its inaugural season and was awarded the 'Player of the Tournament.' He was honoured with Rajiv Gandhi Khel Ratna Award.

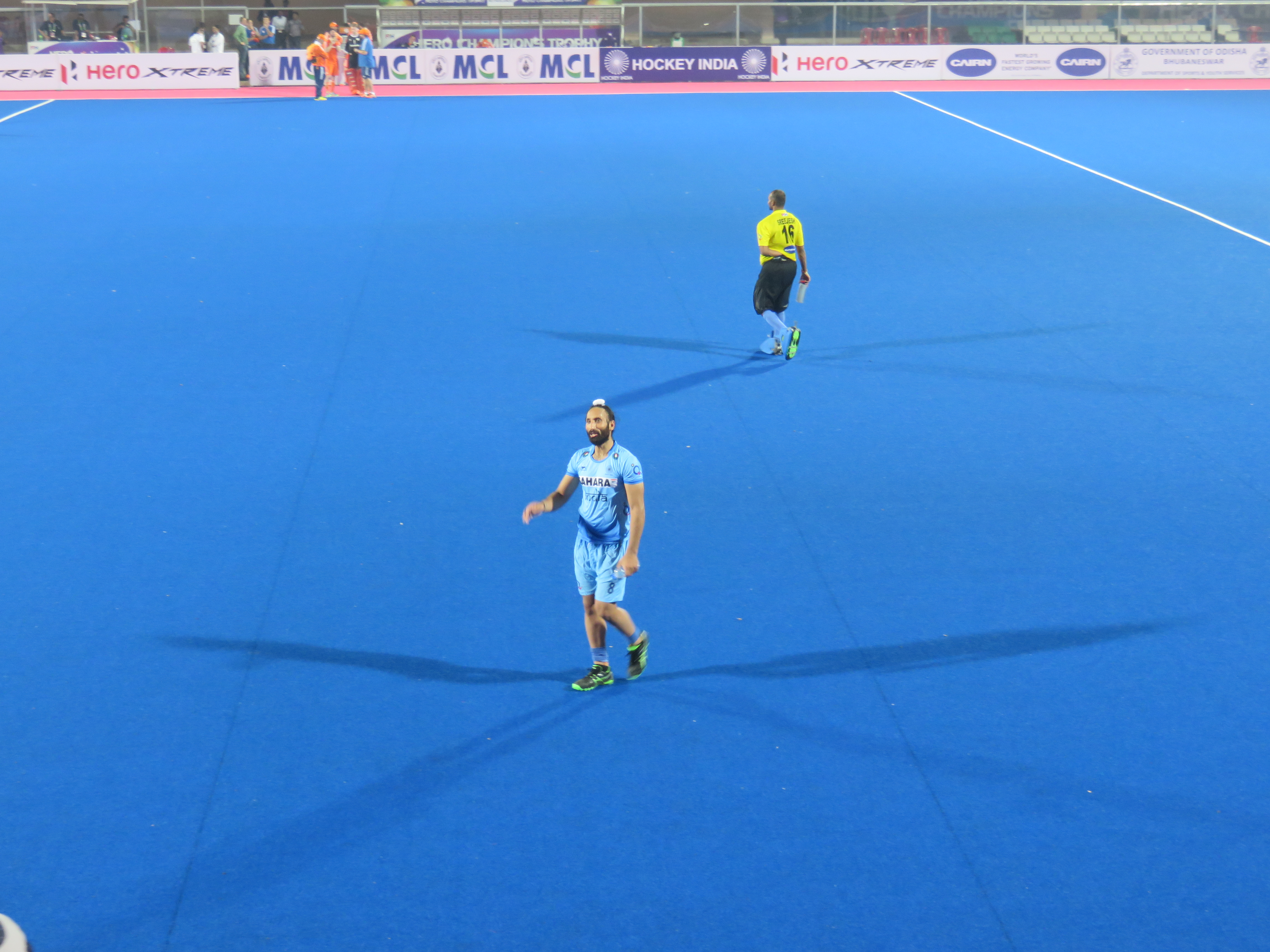
Indian hockey team captain Saradara Singh at Kalinga stadium celebrating after victory over Netherlands

=== Coaching youth teams ===
Sardar Singh currently coaches the India boys' field hockey team and the boys' hockey5s team. Under his coaching, both teams won gold at the 2026 Youth Asia Cup and 2026 Youth Hockey5s Asian Championship , respectively.

=== Punjabi Music Industry ===
Sardar Singh is making his first Punjabi Music Industry debut by featuring in song ‘Gallan Karraiyan’ by veteran Punjabi singer Hardeep Singh of Shehar Patiale de fame. The song is written by Sukha Wadali and the music is by Jaidev Kumar.

== Achievements ==
- Awarded 'Player of Tournament' in the 2012 Sultan Azlan Shah Cup, where India won the Bronze.
- He was adjudged the Player of the Tournament in the 2012 Summer Olympics Qualifiers, where India won the Gold.
- He was adjudged the Player of the Tournament in the 2010 Sultan Azlan Shah Cup, where India won the Gold.
- He participated in Sultan Azlan Shah Hockey Tournament in Malaysia in the year 2006 and the team won bronze medal.
- He participated in SAF Games at Colombo in the year 2006 and the team scored 2nd position.
- He participated in 7th Junior Challenge Open Men's at Poland 2006 and scored 2nd position.
- He participated in 2007 Men's Hockey Champions Challenge at Belgium 2007 and got bronze medal.
- He participated in Commonwealth Games 2006 at Melbourne.
- He participated in INDO-PAK series 2006.
- He participated in Four Nations International Tournament at Germany and the team scored bronze medal.
- He also participated in Four Nations Hockey Tournament at Lahore and the team win silver medal.
- He participated in Men's Hockey Asia Cup at Chennai 2007 and the team grabbed gold medal.
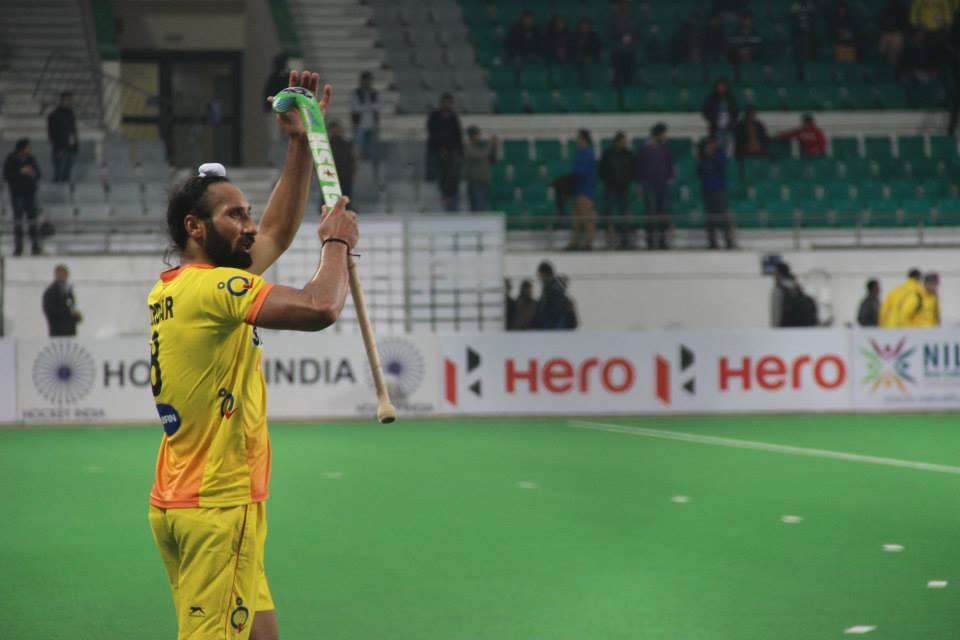
- Sardara Singh in Hero Hockey World League
  He participated for India in Canada for the 7 game Test Series against the Canadian National Field Hockey Team
