= Adam Sinclair =

Adam Sinclair may refer to:

- Adam Sinclair (field hockey) (born 1984), Indian field hockey player
- Adam Sinclair (actor) (born 1977), Scottish actor
