= Viren Rasquinha =

Indian field hockey player

Personal information
- Full name: Viren Wilfred Rasquinha
- Born: 13 September 1980 (age 46) Maharashtra, India
- Height: 5 ft 8 in (1.73 m)

Sport
- Sport: Field hockey
- Position: Midfielder
Youth career
- Team
- –: Bombay Republicans
Senior career
Years	Team	Caps	Goals
–	Air India	-	-
–	Maratha Warriors	-	-
2002–2008	Indian Oil	-	-
2007	HTC Stuttgarter Kickers	-	-
2012	Mumbai Marines	-	-
National team
Years	Team	Caps	Goals
2002–2008	India	180	-
Medal record
Men's field hockey
Representing India
Asian Games
Silver medal – second place	2002 Busan	Team
Asia Cup
Gold medal – first place	2003 Kuala Lumpur	Team
Afro-Asian Games
Gold medal – first place	2003 Hyderabad	Team
Junior World Cup
Gold medal – first place	2001 Hobart	Team

Viren Wilfred Rasquinha (born 13 September 1980) is an Indian former field hockey player and captain of the Indian national team. He was a member of the team that competed at the 2004 Athens Olympics. He quit international hockey in 2008 to pursue management studies at the age of 28.

== Early life ==
Rasquinha was born in 1980 to Eric and Merlyn Rasquinha. He studied at St. Stanislaus High School in Bandra, Mumbai, then graduated with a B.Com. from MMK College in Bandra. His father was an engineer, his mother, a doctor at the Bombay Municipal Corporation, and his brothers are engineers.

== Hockey career ==
Rasquinha made his junior international debut in 1999, and was part of the team that won the 2001 Junior World Cup in Hobart, Australia.

He made his senior international debut as a midfielder in May 2002, at a Four Nation Tournament in Adelaide. He won a silver medal at the 2002 Asian Games in Busan, gold medals at the Asia Cup in Kuala Lumpur and the Afro-Asian Games in Hyderabad in 2003. He was part of the Olympic team which finished seventh in Athens in the 2004 Olympic Games. He led the Indian Hockey team for the first time in the bilateral series against Pakistan in 2004. He was also captain of the Premier Hockey League team Maratha Warriors, and played for Tata Sports, Air India, and the Indian Oil Corporation, as well as 180 international matches. Rasquinha announced his retirement from hockey on 15 January 2008 at the age of 28, to pursue his studies.

He said he was extremely disappointed with the sorry state of affairs of the national sports.

== Business career ==
After retiring from hockey, Rasquinha studied for a Masters in Business Administration (MBA) at the Indian School of Business in Hyderabad. After completion of his MBA, he joined Olympic Gold Quest in 2009, and is now its CEO.

Along with Pullela Gopichand and Abhinav Bindra, he was a member of the PMO Task Force after the 2016 Rio Olympics that prepared India's plans for the Olympic Games in 2020, 2024 and 2028. Their report was submitted to the PMO on 12 August 2017.

Rasquinha was named as one of the "Top 40 Under 40" leaders in India for 2017–18 by the Economic Times.

== Personal life ==
Rasquinha got married in 2013 to Smitha Nair.

== Honours ==
- 2004, Shiv Chhatrapati Award from the Government of Maharashtra.
- 2005, Arjuna Award for Best Sportsman of the Year in Hockey.
