= Thijs de Greeff =

Dutch field hockey player

Thijs de Greeff (born 28 February 1982, in Amsterdam) is a Dutch field hockey player, who made his debut for the Men's National Team in 2005. He plays club hockey for HC Klein Zwitserland in The Hague and Bangalore Lions of the Premier Hockey League.
