= Aishbagh Stadium =

Field hockey stadium in Bhopal, India

- Interactive map of Aishbagh Stadium
- Location: Bhopal, Madhya Pradesh, India
- Coordinates: 23.255720°N 77.420525°E
- Owner: Government of Madhya Pradesh
- Capacity: 15,000

Construction
- Renovated: 2009

Tenant
- Bhopal Badshahs

Aishbagh Stadium is a field hockey stadium in Bhopal, Madhya Pradesh, India. It has a seating capacity of 15,000 people.

It was the home venue for the World Series Hockey team, Bhopal Badshahs.

In 2014, the stadium hosted 4th Hockey India Senior Women National Championship (Division B) final where Assam beat Himachal Pradesh by 3–2.

== Important matches ==
| No. | Date | Score | Home side | Opponent | Report |
|---|---|---|---|---|---|
| 1 | 9 March | 2 - 1 | Bhopal Badshahs | Delhi Wizards | Match 20 |
| 2 | 10 March | 2 - 3 | Bhopal Badshahs | Sher-e-Punjab | Match 22 |
| 3 | 12 March | 3 - 1 | Bhopal Badshahs | Chennai Cheetahs | Match 26 |
| 4 | 24 March | 4 - 4 | Bhopal Badshahs | Chandigarh Comets | Match 43 |
| 5 | 25 March | 2 - 1 | Bhopal Badshahs | Mumbai Marines | Match 46 |
| 6 | 27 March | 2 - 5 | Bhopal Badshahs | Karnataka Lions | Match 50 |
| 7 | 29 March | 4 - 5 | Bhopal Badshahs | Pune Strykers | Match 54 |
