= Ignace Tirkey =

Indian field hockey player

Ignacious Tirkey
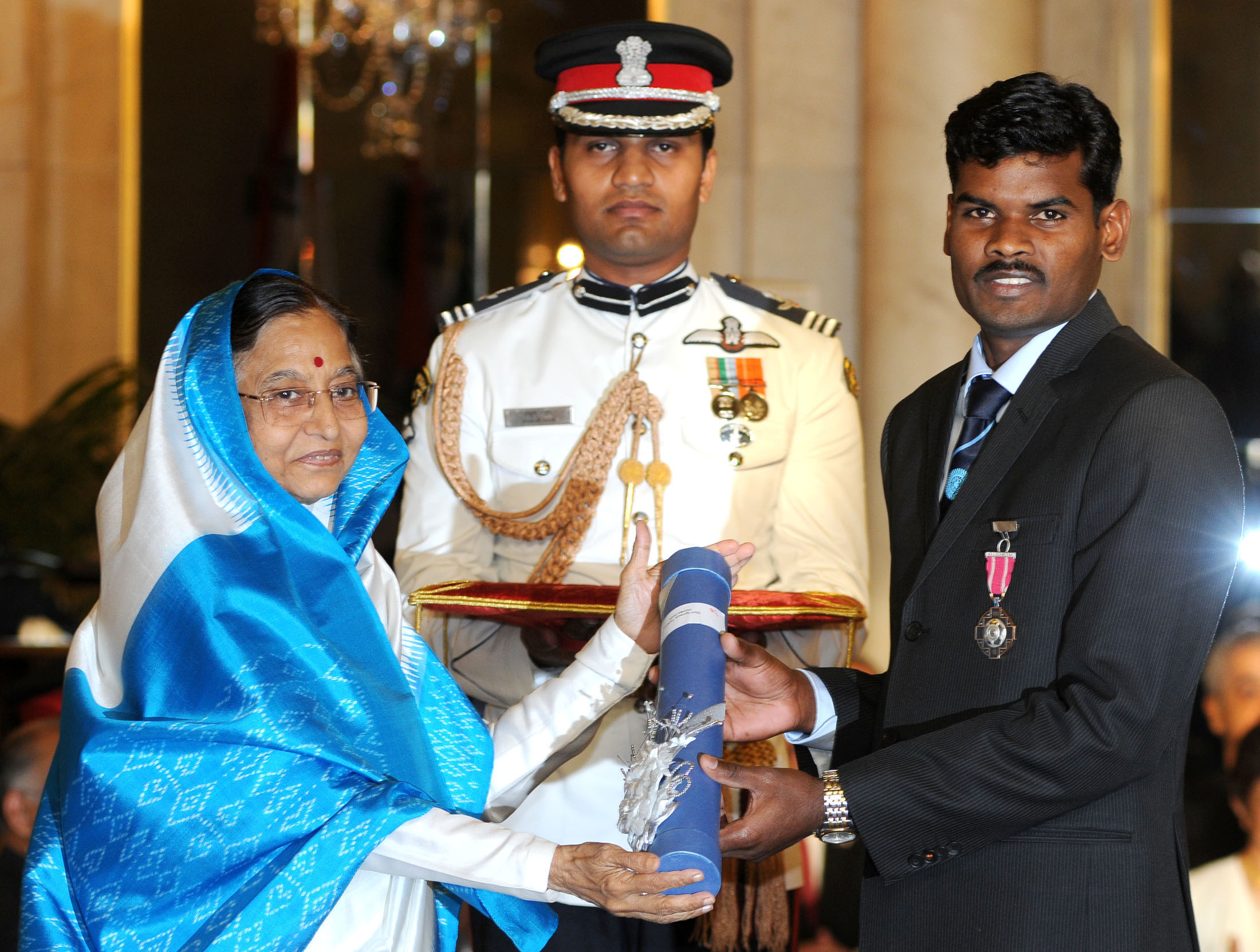

Personal information
- Born: 10 May 1981 (age 45) Lulkidihi, Sundergarh, Odisha, India

Sport
- Sport: Field hockey
- Position: Fullback
Senior career
Years	Team	Caps	Goals
–	Services	-	-
2005–?	Chennai Veerans	-	-
2007–2008	Orissa Steelers	-	-
National team
Years	Team	Caps	Goals
2001–2012	India	250+	-
Medal record
Men's field hockey
Representing India
Asian Games
Silver medal – second place	2002 Busan	Team
Asia Cup
Gold medal – first place	2003 Kuala Lumpur	Team
Gold medal – first place	2007 Chennai	Team
Asian Champions Trophy
Gold medal – first place	2011 Ordos City

Ignacious "Ignace" Tirkey is an Indian field hockey player. He plays as a fullback and has captained the Indian team.

He also serves the Madras Engineering Group (Madras Sappers corps of engineers) Indian army as a commissioned officer. He holds the rank of Major.

== Early life ==
Ignace Tirkey's younger brother Prabodh Tirkey also represented India in hockey. He is a product of Panposh Sports Hostel, Rourkela where he was spotted by Indian Army to help him pursue his career.

== Career ==
Tirkey made his debut for the national side in February 2001 at the Akbar el Yom Tournament in Cairo against Belgium. He was a member of Indian team that participated in the Athens Olympic in 2004, where India finished seventh. In club hockey, Tirkey played for Services.

He is most remembered for a goal that he scored through Pakistan's ace striker Sohail Abbas's legs in the final minutes of 2003 Asia Cup final to give India the winning lead after both teams were locked at 2-2 (India eventually added a 4th goal in the last minute). The match won India its first gold in Asia Cups.

Another highlight of his was in the Muruguppa Gold Cup in Aug 2001, where he scored a golden goal to win the final, and thereafter in December 2002 during the National Games in Hyderabad.

== Awards ==
S.No.	Awards	Year
1	Padma Shree	2010
2	Arjuna Award	2009
3	Ekalavya Puraskar	2003
4	Services Sportsman of the Year	2004
5	Vishisht Seva Medal	2005
