= Dennis Meredith =

Australian field hockey player

Dennis Meredith AM, born in Adelaide, South Australia, is a former member of the Australia National Field Hockey Team playing 22 times for his country.

He then moved to officiating and became a World Cup and Olympic International Umpire (field hockey). Meredith went on to become an International Hockey Federation Umpire's Manager and Technical Delegate, and between 1999 and 2000 he worked in the role of FIH Umpiring Development Officer for Asia.

During the period 2001 to 2010, he acted in the role of Competition and Events Manager for the International Hockey Federation, responsible for the coordination of all major international hockey events throughout the world (men and women).

He was the Event Delegate for the hockey competitions at the inaugural 2010 Summer Youth Olympics.

Meredith was seconded to the Organising Committee of the 2010 Commonwealth Games, New Delhi and in his capacity as the Hockey Sports Manager, coordinated the organisation of the men’s and women’s hockey competitions at the Games. In 2011 he was appointed as the Technical Director of World Series Hockey (WSH), a franchise based professional hockey league. WSH was a joint initiative between the Indian Hockey Federation and Nimbus Sport, played with eight teams across India.

During his extensive involvement in a variety of volunteer and administrative roles in hockey spanning 7 decades, Meredith contributed heavily to the local South Australian hockey community, and held the role of President of the Port Adelaide District Hockey Club from 2016–2022, 1991–1994, 1987–1989, and 1974–1977.

Dennis Meredith was appointed a Member (AM) of the Order of Australia (General Division) in the 2019 Queen’s Birthday Honours in recognition of his significant service to hockey through roles at the local, state, national and international level.

In 2023, Meredith became an inductee into the Hockey Australia Hall of Fame (General Category), for excelling at the highest level of the sport and making a telling impact on Australian hockey on the world stage which significantly enhanced the image of the sport.

== Books ==
He has written numerous educational manuals, and one book on the subject of youth hockey umpiring: "Handbook for junior hockey umpires"

== Awards ==
- 1982 – Australian Hockey Association Award of Merit
- 1986 – Inaugural recipient of International Hockey Federation Guust Lauthowers Trophy for services to the development of international hockey umpiring.
- 1994 – South Australian Hockey Association Life Membership
- 1997 – Official of the Year (Men’s Hockey) – Australian Sports Commission National Officiating Program
- 2000 – Australian Sports Medal – Awarded by the Commonwealth Government
- 2002 – Hockey Australia Life Membership
- 2019 – Order of Australia (General Division)
- 2023 - Hockey Australia Hall of Fame inductee (General Category)
