= List of men's field hockey players with 100 or more international goals =

The top international goalscorer in field hockey is Dhyan Chand of India, who scored 570 goals in 185 international matches in the traditional form of the game played on grass. The second-highest international goalscorer overall and the leading international goalscorer on artificial turf is Sohail Abbas of Pakistan, who scored 348 goals in 311 international appearances. He is closely followed by Tom Boon of Belgium, who has scored 347 international goals in 397 appearances. He is on the verge of breaking the international record on artificial turf. He is followed by Paul Litjens of Netherlands, who scored a total of 268 international goals in 177 matches. He remained the leading international goalscorer on artificial turf for 22 years, from 1982 to 2004, until his record was surpassed by Sohail Abbas. He is followed by Harmanpreet Singh of India, who has scored 250 international goals in 283 matches. Balbir Singh Sr. of India ranks next, with 246 goals in only 61 international matches, all of which were played on grass.

Abbas was the sixth Pakistani to achieve 100 international goals in his career when he scored a hat-trick against Great Britain at the 2000 Summer Olympics while being the fastest player to score 100 goals on artificial turf. The first player from India to score 100 goals on artificial turf is Dhanraj Pillay, who scored a total of 170 international goals. Manzoor-ul-Hassan of Pakistan was the first player from Asia to score 100 international goals on artificial turf. The first player outside of Asia and Europe to score 100 international goals was Mark Hager of Australia. To date, thirteen players representing India, eleven from Netherlands, and ten from Pakistan have scored 100 or more international goals. The Asian Hockey Federation, the European Hockey Federation, and the Oceania Hockey Federation has the highest number of players who have scored 100 goals in their international career, with 25 players from AHF, 23 from EHF, and 12 from OHF.

== By player ==
As of 5 November 2026 (UTC)

Players in bold are still active at international level.

Indicates the top scorer of all FIH's confederations.
Indicates the top scorer of the respective confederation.
Indicates the top scorer of the respective nation.

Rank	Player	Nation	Confederation	Goals	Caps	Goals per match	Career span	Ref.
1	Dhyan Chand	India	AHF	570	185	3.08	1926–1949	
2	Sohail Abbas	Pakistan	AHF	348	311	1.12	1998–2012	
3	**Tom Boon**	Belgium	EHF	347	397	0.87	2008–	
4	Paul Litjens	Netherlands	EHF	268	177	1.51	1971–1982	
5	**Harmanpreet Singh**	India	AHF	250	284	0.88	2015–	
6	Balbir Singh Sr.	India	AHF	246	61	4.03	1947–1958	
7	Greg Nicol	South Africa	AfHF	245	200	1.23	1994–2004	
8	Jamie Dwyer	Australia	OHF	243	365	0.67	2001–2016	
9	Jorge Lombi	Argentina	PAHF	231	223	1.04	1991–2004	
10	Björn Michel	Germany	EHF	229	307	0.75	1993–2004	
11	**Gonzalo Peillat**	Argentina / Germany	PAHF / EHF	221	232	0.95	2011–	
11	Taeke Taekema	Netherlands	EHF	221	242	0.91	2000–2011	
13	Teun de Nooijer	Netherlands	EHF	219	453	0.48	1994–2012	
14	Floris Jan Bovelander	Netherlands	EHF	215	241	0.89	1985–1996	
15	Mark Hager	Australia	OHF	181	231	0.78	1988–1999	
16	K. D. Singh	India	AHF	175+	80+	2.19	1946–late 1950s	
17	Jay Stacy	Australia	OHF	172	321	0.54	1988–2000	
18	**Blake Govers**	Australia	OHF	170	185	0.92	2015–	
19	Dhanraj Pillay	India	AHF	170	339	0.43	1989–2004	
20	Ties Kruize	Netherlands	EHF	167	202	0.83	1972–1986	
21	Christopher Zeller	Germany	EHF	158	204	0.77	2003–2016	
22	Carsten Fischer	Germany	EHF	154	246	0.63	1982–1996	
23	Stephen Davies	Australia	OHF	151	274	0.55	1989–2000	
24	Hassan Sardar	Pakistan	AHF	150	148	1.01	1979–1987	
24	Phil Burrows	New Zealand	OHF	150	343	0.44	2000–2015	
26	**Alexander Hendrickx**	Belgium	EHF	143	237	0.60	2012–	
27	Simon Child	New Zealand	OHF	142	274	0.52	2005–2016	
28	Bram Lomans	Netherlands	EHF	141	205	0.69	1995–2007	
29	Sandeep Singh	India	AHF	138	186	0.74	2004–2012	
30	Ashley Jackson	England / Great Britain	EHF	137	250	0.55	2006–2021	
31	Tahir Zaman	Pakistan	AHF	134	252	0.53	1987–1998	
32	V. R. Raghunath	India	AHF	132	228	0.58	2005–2017	
33	**Mandeep Singh**	India	AHF	131	305	0.43	2013–	
34	Kamran Ashraf	Pakistan	AHF	129	166	0.78	1993–2002	
35	Hanif Khan	Pakistan	AHF	127	177	0.72	1976–1985	
35	Hayden Shaw	New Zealand	OHF	127	178	0.71	2002–2011	
35	**Jeroen Hertzberger**	Netherlands	EHF	127	267	0.48	2007–2021	
35	**Jeremy Hayward**	Australia	OHF	127	266	0.48	2014–	
39	Santi Freixa	Spain	EHF	126	193	0.65	2000–2014	
40	Rupinder Pal Singh	India	AHF	125	223	0.56	2010–2022	
41	Surinder Singh Sodhi	India	AHF	120+	100+	1.2	1975–1982	
42	Pau Quemada	Spain	EHF	119	293	0.41	2003–2021	
42	Barry Middleton	England / Great Britain	EHF	119	432	0.28	2003–2018	
44	Taco van den Honert	Netherlands	EHF	118	215	0.55	1987–1996	
45	Luke Doerner	Australia	OHF	117	175	0.67	2005–2012	
46	Florian Fuchs	Germany	EHF	116	239	0.49	2009–2021	
46	Stephan Veen	Netherlands	EHF	116	275	0.42	1989–2000	
48	Mink van der Weerden	Netherlands	EHF	115	191	0.6	2010–2021	
48	Chris Ciriello	Australia	OHF	115	195	0.59	2008–2017	
50	Moritz Fürste	Germany	EHF	112	262	0.43	2005–2016	
51	Calum Giles	England / Great Britain	EHF	110	143	0.77	1995–2000	
51	Rehan Butt	Pakistan	AHF	110	272	0.4	2001–2012	
53	Jang Jong-hyun	South Korea	AHF	109	287	0.38	2004–2012	
54	Gagan Ajit Singh	India	AHF	108	157	0.69	1997–2007	
55	Prabhjot Singh	India	AHF	107	250	0.43	2001–2013	
56	**Razie Rahim**	Malaysia	AHF	107	309	0.35	2006–	
57	Tom van 't Hek	Netherlands	EHF	106	221	0.48	1976–1990	
57	Muhammad Imran	Pakistan	AHF	106	296	0.36		
59	Troy Elder	Australia	OHF	103	169	0.61	1998–2007	
59	Shakeel Abbasi	Pakistan	AHF	103	309	0.33	2003–2014	
61	Manzoor-ul-Hassan	Pakistan	AHF	101	154	0.66	1973–1982	
61	Shahbaz Ahmed	Pakistan	AHF	101	304	0.33	1986–2002	
61	Matías Paredes	Argentina	PAHF	101	356	0.28	2001–2019	
64	Baljit Singh Dhillon	India	AHF	100	327	0.31	1993–2004	

== By nationality ==
Players	Country	Confederation
13	India	AHF
11	Netherlands	EHF
10	Pakistan	AHF
9	Australia	OHF
5	Germany (Note: Gonzalo Peillat has played for both Argentina and Germany. He has scored 176 goals for Argentina and 2 goals for Germany.)	EHF
3	Argentina	PAHF
3	England / Great Britain	EHF
3	New Zealand	OHF
2	Spain	EHF
1	Belgium	EHF
1	Malaysia	AHF
1	South Africa	AfHF
1	South Korea	AHF
63	13	5

== By confederation ==
Confederation	Countries	Players
AHF	4	25
EHF	5	22
OHF	2	12
PAHF	1	3
AfHF	1	1
Total	13	63

== See also ==
- List of men's footballers with 50 or more international goals
