= Hyderabad Sultans =

Indian field hockey team

- Full name: Hyderabad Sultans
- League: Premier Hockey League
- Founded: 2005
- Dissolved: 2008
- Home ground: Gachibowli Hockey Stadium; Hyderabad (Capacity 8,000)

Personnel
- Captain: Sardara Singh
- Manager: Madhukaran

The Hyderabad Sultans was the Indian Premier Hockey League team from Hyderabad. The squad was captained by Sardara Singh in the 2008 edition. They were winners of the first Premier Hockey League in 2005.

== History ==
=== Founding ===
The club was formed in year 2005. Sultans, led by ever-dependable Dilip Tirkey, were crowned the champions of the inaugural PHL at home ground, held at the sprawling Gachibowli Sports Complex, with penalty corner specialist Sohail Abbas and Waseem Ahmed who helped the team score crucial wins with their combined moves in the first year. Sohail Abbas became the joint top-scorers of the league.

=== Loss of form and players exodus (2006–2007) ===
In the second year too, Hyderabad Sultans played well and were in contention for the final berth, but were edged out by Bangalore Lions on goal average. They won five out of the eight matches and had 13 points, just one less than the table toppers Chandigarh Dynamos and Hyderabad Sultans finished third in league. In the third year, Hyderabad Sultans failed miserably, winning just one match in the new format. They also lost their skipper Dilip Tirkey and many experienced players who joined Orissa Steelers, as they were promoted to the Premier division. Sultans ended at the bottom of the table, avoiding relegation as Second division was scrapped.

=== 2008 ===
In the season of 2008 young Sardara Singh led the team, along with his brother Didar Singh, Bikas Toppo and Pawal Lakra, who were capable of making inroads into any defence. The team had an emerging drag-flicker in Diwakar Ram. The players to watch out were upcoming Promod Kumar, who was the fulcrum of the team, the foreign players Adnan Maqsood and Kamran Ahmed, along with Dutch goalkeeper Oscar Ter Weeme. The team also had a new coach in Madhukaran who was assisted by Alphonse Lazarus and they finished fourth, qualifying for play-off where they lost to Chandigarh Dynamos.

== Season by season performance ==
Season	Played	Won	Draw	Lost	ET-W	ET-L	GF	GA	GD	Points	Position
2005	8	6	0	2	-	-	24	17	7	19	Champions
2006	8	5	0	3	-	-	10	9	1	13	Third
2007	12	1	0	9	1	1	11	26	-15	6	Seventh
2008	6	3	0	2	1	0	11	7	4	11	Fourth

== Players ==
As of 2008

Name	Country
Sardara Singh (captain)	(India)
Dinesh Ekka	(India)
Samir Baxla	(India)
Jasbir Singh	(India)
Diwakar Ram	(India)
Johnson Ekka	(India)
Anand Tirkey	(India)
Nitin Kumar	(India)
Didar Singh	(India)
Pramod Kumar	(India)
Bikas Toppo	(India)
Pawal Lakra	(India)
Veer Singh	(India)
Kulbhushan	(India)
K M Chengappa	(India)
Kamran Ahmed	(Pakistan)
Adnan Maqsood	(Pakistan)
Oscar Ter Weeme	(Netherlands)

Note: List of players is obtained from PHL website. The list might change in the near future.

Personnel

- (India) Madhukaran (Chief coach)
- (India) Alphonse Lazarus (Asst. coach)
- (India) C R Bheem Singh (Physical trainer)
- (India) P.Kanthaiah (Team manager)

=== Former players ===
Former players
Name	Career	Country
Dilip Tirkey	2005–2006	(India)
S Rajasekhar	2005	(India)
Inderjeet Singh Chadha	2005	(India)
Ajitesh Rai	2005–2007	(India)
Harsha Vardhan	2005	(India)
Chandan Singh	2005	(India)
Suresh	2005	(India)
Lazarus Barla	2005–2006	(India)
Sameer Dad	2005–2006	(India)
Cyril Ekka	2005	(India)
Sreejesh	2005	(India)
Nitya Jayanand	2005–2006	(India)
Susan Topno	2005	(India)
Devesh Chauhan	2006–2007	(India)
Nitin Kumar	2006 – present	(India)
Johnson Ekka	2006 – present	(India)

Former players
Name	Career	Country
Prabhakar Singh	2006	(India)
Amit Srivastava	2006	(India)
Vikram Pillay	2006–2007	(India)
Veer Singh	2006 and 2008	(India)
M A Aleem	2006	(India)
Devender Pal Singh	2006	(India)
Pekrelo	2007	(India)
M. Nagraj	2007	(India)
Saranjeet Singh	2007	(India)
Didar Singh	2007–present	(India)
Sardara Singh	2007 – present	(India)
Vivek Gupta	2007	(India)
Rajinder Singh	2007	(India)
Maryland Amir Hayat	2007	(India)
Diwakar Ram	2007 – present	(India)
Baljit Singh Chandi	2007 – present	(India)

=== Goal keepers ===
Dates	Name	Country
2005	Suresh	(India)
2005	Ahmed Alam	(Pakistan)
2006	Salman Akbar	(Pakistan)
2006–2007	Devesh Chauhan	(India)
2007	Pfkerlo	(India)
2008	Oscar ter Weeme	(Netherlands)

=== Club captains ===
Dates	Name	Country
2005–2006	Dilip Tirkey	(India)
2007	Devesh Chauhan	(India)
2008 – present	Sardara Singh	(India)

=== International players ===
Name	Career	Country
Waseem Ahmed	2005	(Pakistan)
Ahmed Alam	2005	(Pakistan)
Sohail Abbas	2005	(Pakistan)
Salman Akbar	2006	(Pakistan)
Jorge Lombi	2006	(Argentina)
Shakeel Abbasi	2006–2007	(Pakistan)
Ramón Alegre	2007	(Spain)
Sebastian Westerhout	2007	(Netherlands)
Tariq Aziz	2007	(Pakistan)
Kamran Ahmed	2008	(Pakistan)
Adnan Maqsood	2008	(Pakistan)
Oscar Ter Weeme	2008	(Netherlands)

== Honours ==
- Premier Hockey League: 1
  - 2005
