= Prabodh Tirkey =

Indian hockey midfielder (born 1984)

Personal information
- Born: 6 October 1984 (age 42) Lulkidihi, Sundergarh; Odisha, India
- Height: 1.68 m (5 ft 6 in)

Sport
- Sport: Field hockey
- Position: Halfback
Senior career
Years	Team	Caps	Goals
–	Orissa Steelers	-	-
–	Mumbai Marines	-	-
–	Kalinga Lancers	-	-
National team
Years	Team	Caps	Goals
2000–	India U16		-
2003–	India U21		-
–	India	161	(2)
Medal record
Men's field hockey
Representing India
Asian Games
Bronze medal – third place	2010 Guangzhou	Team
Asia Cup
Gold medal – first place	2007 Chennai	Team
Sultan Azlan Shah Cup
Bronze medal – third place	2007 Malaysia	Team
Champions Challenge
Bronze medal – third place	2007 Belgium	Team
U16 Asia Cup
Gold medal – first place	2000 Singapore

Prabodh Tirkey (born 6 October 1984) is an Indian former hockey midfielder and a former captain of the Indian hockey team. He joined the Bharatiya Janta party days after resigning from the Congress which withdrew his election nomination.

== Personal life ==
Prabodh is the younger brother of the Indian hockey player Ignace Tirkey, who also has captained the Indian national team. His idol is another Indian ex-captain and one of the best defenders in world hockey, Dilip Tirkey, who comes from Sundergarh, Prabodh's hometown. Prabodh married Sweta Tirkey at Ranchi on 28 January 2011.

== Career ==
In his early career, he was the national captain of sub-junior, junior and India-A teams, and finally became the India senior team captain. Under his captaincy, Indian U16 team won the 2000 Sub-Junior Asia Cup in Singapore. He was in the Indian team which won the 2007 Asia Cup in Chennai.

== Awards ==
- 2001 Ekalavya Puraskar
- 2009 Biju Patnaik State Sports Award
