= Wassim Almawi =

American academic

Wassim Y. Almawi is professor in the School of Pharmacy at Lebanese American University in Byblos, Lebanon, and adjunct professor at Faculty of Sciences, El Manar University in Tunis, Tunisia. This followed appointment as professor and chairman of Department of Biochemistry at Arabian Gulf University in Bahrain from 2000 to 2017. Almawi is also the Chief of the Special and Molecular Diagnostics Laboratory in Bahrain.
