= Bangalore Hockey Stadium =

Field hockey stadium in Karnataka, India

Coordinates: 12.961684°N 77.600642°E

- KSHA Hockey Stadium
- Interactive map of Bangalore Hockey Stadium
- Full name: Karnataka State Hockey Association Hockey Stadium
- Location: Akkithimmanahalli, Bangalore, Karnataka, India
- Owner: Karnataka State Hockey Association
- Capacity: 7,000

Construction
- Renovated: 2011

Tenant
- World Series Hockey

Bangalore Hockey Stadium, also known as KSHA Hockey Stadium, is a field hockey stadium at Akkithimmanahalli, Bangalore, Karnataka, India. It is the home ground of the Karnataka Lions of the World Series Hockey. It has a seating capacity of 7,000 people.

The stadium hosted seven home matches of Karnataka Lions in World Series Hockey. It will also host the first semi-final of World Series Hockey in 2012.

== History ==
Akkithimmanhalli lake was breached in the 1970s as part of a Malaria Eradication Drive and the Hockey stadium constructed in its place.
