= Waseem Shaikh =

South African actor

- Born: Waseem Hussain Shaikh; 7 November 1984 (age 41); Dubai, UAE
- Years active: 2005 – present

Waseem Shaikh (born Waseem Hussain Shaikh on 7 November 1984) is a South African actor of South Asian descent, best known for his role as fisherman and lifeguard, Ashwin Pillay on the SABC 1 TV Series Bay of Plenty.

Born in Dubai, U.A.E., and raised in South Africa, Waseem attended college in Texas, South Africa and Canada, where he currently resides. In 2005, he was crowned Mr. India-South Africa. Later that year, he took up an internship at Lotus FM which continued till 2008, when he relocated to Toronto, where he currently resides.

In 2009, he starred alongside Ashmit Patel, Priyanshu Chatterjee and Vipin Sharma in the independent feature Florida Road.
