= Sohail Abbas =

Pakistani field hockey player

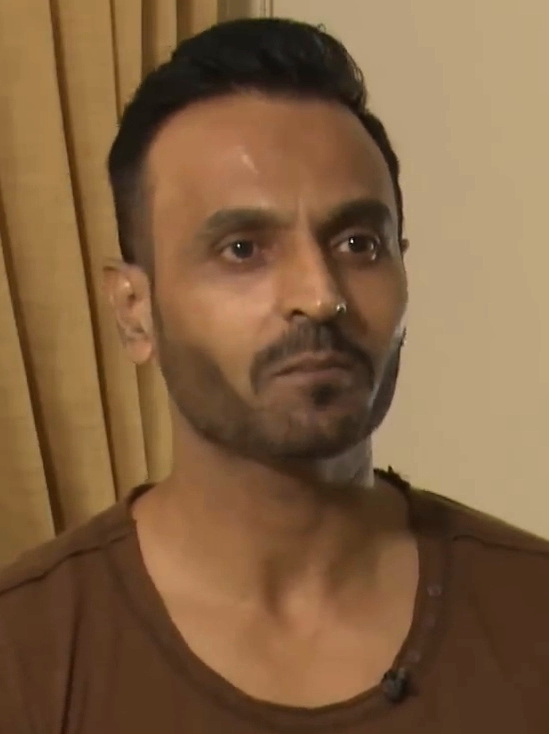
- Abbas during an interview by BBC in 2020

Personal information
- Born: 9 June 1977 (age 49) Karachi, Sindh, Pakistan

Sport
- Sport: Field hockey
- Position: Defender Full-back
Senior career
Years	Team	Caps	Goals
1997-2002	Habib Bank	-	-
2002	BS Nasional HC	8	7
2003-2017	WAPDA	-	-
2003-2004	Harvestehuder THC	28	11
2005	Hyderabad Sultans	7	7
2005-2009	HC Rotterdam	114	93
National team
Years	Team	Caps	Goals
1998-2012	Pakistan	311	(348)
Medal record
Men's field hockey
Representing Pakistan
Commonwealth Games
Bronze medal – third place	2002 Manchester	Team
Asian Games
Gold medal – first place	2010 Guangzhou	Team
Bronze medal – third place	1998 Bangkok	Team
Afro-Asian Games
Silver medal – second place	2003 Hyderabad	Team
Asia Cup
Silver medal – second place	1999 Kuala Lumpur	Team
Silver medal – second place	2003 Kuala Lumpur	Team
Silver medal – second place	2009 Kuantan	Team
Champions Trophy
Silver medal – second place	1998 Lahore	Team
Bronze medal – third place	2002 Cologne	Team
Bronze medal – third place	2003 Amstelveen	Team
Bronze medal – third place	2004 Lahore	Team
Sultan Azlan Shah Cup
Gold medal – first place	2000 Ipoh	Team
Gold medal – first place	2003 Ipoh	Team
Silver medal – second place	2011 Ipoh	Team
Silver medal – second place	2004 Ipoh	Team
- Updated on 9 August 2012

Sohail Abbas (born 9 June 1977) is a former professional field hockey player from Pakistan who played as a full-back for the Pakistan men's national field hockey team. Regarded as one of the greatest players of all time, he is the highest goal scorer in modern hockey (artificial turf) and second highest goal scorer in field hockey with 348 international goals. A drag-flick specialist noted for his lethal flicks with great accuracy and speed in front of goal from penalty corners, he is widely regarded as the 'King of the drag flick'.

Abbas started his professional career in Pakistan and played professional hockey in Malaysia, Netherlands, Germany and India in his career most notably for Dutch side HC Rotterdam. After representing Pakistan at junior levels Abbas made his international debut in the Test series against India in February 1998. He scored his first senior international goal in the second match of the series in a 2–1 win. Abbas has 315 caps for Pakistan and in which he scored 348 goals including 21 hat-tricks an international record. He has represented his country at 1998, 2002, 2006 and 2010 FIH Hockey World Cups and the 2000, 2004 and 2012 Summer Olympics being the top scorer for Pakistan at both the World Cups and Olympics.

== Early life ==
Born at Karachi's Holy Family Hospital, Soldier Bazaar on 9 June 1977, Sohail is a former pupil of Karachi's Habib Public School, the school of many other hockey stars. In fact, it has been rightly remarked that hockey is taught as a subject in this school.

He came from a sporting family; his father, Syed Iftikhar Hussain, was a former first-class cricketer. He represented Karachi as well as Pak Crescent Club, famous for producing Zaheer Abbas. Abbas is eldest of three brothers. Raheel Abbas, his younger brother, is also former professional first-class cricketer. Sohail has often said that his inspiration came from his uncle, Safdar Abbas, a left-winger who represented Pakistan from 1973 to 1981 where he scored against Argentina during the 1973 World Cup as a 16-year-old boy. Abbas is keen to emphasize the part played by Safdar, who, Abbas says, inspired him as a youngster.

Abbas started playing hockey for his school and later for his college. In the beginning he played as a forward but due to his physical built and unsatisfactory performance his youth coach moved him in the defense. Dejected by this Abbas started practicing his drag-flick abilities to keep the scoring aspect of his game. Before him Pakistan played a brand of hockey that was known for its speedy forwards who created goal scoring chances from their technique not penalty-corner specialists like the European style. He started practicing solely on drag-flicks from watching old video tapes of former players and would spend hours on drag-flicks even after match practice.

== Club career ==
=== Domestic ===
==== HBL ====
Abbas started his professional senior career in his native Pakistan playing for his departmental team Habib Bank of his hometown Karachi in the Pakistan National Hockey Championship. Abbas helped his domestic team to reach the final of the National Championship in 2001.

==== SSGC and WAPDA ====
After a brief stunt with SSGC Abbas continued playing in the Pakistan domestic season but this time for WAPDA. In the season 2003 and 2004, he won the National Hockey Championship back to back with WAPDA as captain. He returned for his departmental team in Pakistan WAPDA from Netherlands in 2009. He was top scorer in the 2009 National Hockey Championship with 16 goals and in 2010 won the Hockey Asian Champions Club Cup. He continued playing for them in the domestic season until 2017 at the age of 40.

=== Abroad ===
==== Amsterdam HBC ====
Abbas's extraordinary talent and goal scoring prowess mean that he is a target of hockey clubs all over the world. He joined Dutch club Amsterdam HBC in 1999 playing the 1999-2000 season for them where he reached the semifinals, due to his commitments with the Pakistan team, Abbas only played for nine weeks and that too in two spells. He was provided with free lodging and boarding, offered a car and paid as much as 700 dollars per match.

==== Malaysia and Germany ====
In December 2002 he joined the Kuala Lumpur based side BS Nasional HC in Malaysia with whom he won the TNB Cup, the domestic cup competition and in April 2003 he played a season in the top division of Germany in the 1.Bundesliga for Harvestehuder THC of Hamburg.

==== Hyderabad Sultans ====
In 2005 he played in the inaugural season of Indian Premier Hockey League for Hyderabad Sultans. He was the star attraction of the tournament and his team won the title.

==== Rotterdam HC ====
In May 2005 he made his second stint in the Netherlands after HC Rotterdam signed him for the promotion-relegation play-offs. He scored in his debut for the club as his team won the promotion to the First Division for the following season. Abbas finished as top scorer for his club with 20 goals in the 2005–06 season but his team failed to reach the finals. He again finished as top scorer for Rotterdam with 22 goals in 2006–07 season helping his team finish third and securing qualification for the inaugural season of the Euro Hockey League. In 2007–08 season his team finished third both in the Hoofdklasse and in the 2007-08 Euro Hockey League where he was joint top scorer with 7 goals.

According to Abbas playing in Netherlands with Rotterdam introduced him to different style of play and technique which added to a lot to his game. During the 2005-06 as Pakistan was hit with a devastating earthquake Abbas started a fund raising mission with the approval of his club and Rotterdam city council for the victims of the tragedy. He organized friendly matches between Dutch and international sides composed of international players from Australia, Germany, and India who were also playing professional hockey in Netherlands to raise funds that were to be directly transferred to the affected region through international relief organizations.

==== Hong Kong ====
In 2013 Abbas signed for Punjab Sports Club to play in the semi-professional Hong Kong premier league for a season.

== International career ==
=== Youth teams ===
As a young hockey player, his potential was not realized for some time. He had difficulty making an impact on the professional hockey leagues between 1995 and 1998. Like many Pakistani hockey players, he is a product of the Pakistan Junior Squad. An impressive performance in the 18th Junior National Hockey U18 Championship at Quetta 1995 gained him a place in Pakistan Junior squad which drew their home series 2–2 against Germany Juniors. He was not selected for the tour of Netherlands, Germany and Poland, playing next for Pakistan in the third Junior Asia Cup at Singapore in 1996. He staged a return to the Pakistan Junior side in 1997, a side which beat Germany Junior in four consecutive test matches.

Four months later, he was dropped from the Pakistan Junior squad. Pakistan Junior team manager Samiullah Khan and coach Ayaz Mahmood were not convinced to include him for the 1997 World Cup staged in Milton Keynes – an underwhelming squad that failed to making it to the Junior World Cup semi-finals for the first time in the cup's 25-year history. Finally, he made his debut the following year on the national team and has since become arguably modern hockey's most prolific goalscorer of all time.

=== National debut ===
When he made his international debut during the 20th Pakistan-India series 1998, his role was only to come from the bench for penalty corner drills. His debut was at Peshawar's Lala S.M. Ayub Hockey Stadium on Saturday, 28 February 1998. Pakistan manager effected a substitution midway through the tie, but failed to make an impact. He failed to score in three penalty corners as Pakistan won 4–1. The following day, on 1 March 1998, in the second test at Rawalpindi's Army Hockey Stadium, Abbas announced his arrival on the international scene in dramatic fashion, scoring a drag flick from a penalty corner which proved to be the match-winner in Pakistan's 2–1 victory.

When the rule was changed after the 1998 World Cup, he was not considered for the 1998 Commonwealth Games by coach Shahnaz Sheikh. But he staged a comeback to win silver in 1998 Hockey Champions Trophy in Lahore and bronze at the 1998 Bangkok Asian Games. Abbas struck 20 goals in 1998.

=== Azlan Shah triumph and record year ===
In 1999 Abbas was in terrific form. He started off the year being the top scorer in both the 1999 India-Pakistan test series with 10 goals and 1999 Sultan Azlan Shah Cup with 12 goals helping Pakistan win the title for the first time. He finished top scorer of the 1999 Hockey Asia Cup with 16 goals equaling the record of Hassan Sardar of most goals in an edition of the tournament in 1982. During the match against Sri Lanka he scored 7 goals in the 15–0 victory making him only the sixth player to have scored a double-hattrick for Pakistan in a match. But Pakistan finished second after losing the final to South Korea. Abbas finished the year with 60 goals breaking the record of modern hockey's most international goals in a calendar year by Paul Litjens of Netherlands, 58.

=== 2000 Olympics ===
Pakistan qualified for Sydney Olympics by taking part in 2000 Olympic Qualifiers in March 2000 in Osaka. Pakistan finished second on the Japanese soil, with Sohail scoring 13 goals to finish as leading marksman. Abbas was also leading scorer at the 2000 Olympic Games, Sydney, with 11 goals. Mixing his impressive hitting abilities with drag-flicks, Abbas has proved himself to be the world's most consistent drag-flick converter, his success rate over 65% mark. Pakistan lost the bronze medal match to hosts Australia by 6-3 finishing fourth. This as of now was the last time Pakistan played for a medal at the Olympics in hockey. His total goals in 2000 were 26.

Abbas scored a total of 37 goals in the 2001. Pakistan started off the year playing in an invitational tournament in Dhaka, Bangladesh where they finished second after losing the final to India on penalty strokes. During the tour of Europe he scored a hat-trick against South Korea in Hamburg, Germany. Later he was top-scorer of the 2001 Sultan Azlan Shah Cup with 10 goals but Pakistan finished fourth. In the last assignment of the year Pakistan played in the Champions Trophy in Rotterdam where he scored another hat-trick against Germany but Pakistan again finished at fourth place

=== 2002 World Cup ===
Sohail attracted worldwide attention in 2002 when he emerged as the joint highest scorer along with Argentina's Jorge Lombi in the 10th World Cup at Kuala Lumpur. And all 10 goals that Abbas scored at the Bukit Jalil Stadium in the Malaysian capital were off PCs. He managed 44 goals in 2002 and added yet another feather to his cap in that year. Hasan Sardar was Pakistan's top scorer with 150 goals before Abbas unveiled his goal-scoring prowess. During the Six-Nation Invitational tournament at Kuala Lumpur, a month before World Cup 2002, Sohail scored his 151st international goal, becoming Pakistan's all-time highest scorer in international hockey. He struck nine goals as Pakistan managed bronze medals in 17th Commonwealth Games hockey tournament at Manchester. He struck hat-trick when Pakistan routed South Africa 10–2 in bronze-decider on 4 August 2002. Later, in the 24th CT in Cologne, Germany, Sohail played a major role and Pakistan finished third ahead of India.

=== Suspension and controversy ===
Abbas managed 28 goals in 2003 and for the sixth time running, he finished as annual leading scorer for Pakistan. He struck five goals as Pakistan met success in Ipoh's 12th Azlan Shah Cup in March 2003 but later on Pakistan went to Australia without him, Muhammad Nadeem and Waseem Ahmed as the trio had defied the PHF by skipping the national training camp to play professional league in Germany. Sohail and Waseem represented German club Harvestehuder THC of Hamburg while Nadeem played for Gladbacher HTC. It was Abbas's third spell as pro hockey player after Dutch league 1999 and Malaysian League 2002 (he represented Bank Simpanan Nasional BSN along with Kashif Jawwad). Nadeem did return in time for the trials for the Australia-bound squad, but he was not considered for selection and Pakistan suffered embarrassment, finishing last in both twin 4-Nation tournaments at Perth and Sydney.

Nadeem, later on, was reprimanded for his act while Abbas and Waseem were not allowed to appear in Pakistan-China series in July. They faced an inquiry committee on 14 July 2003 during which they regretted the mistake. Both were allowed to join the camp and seven days later were included in the team for the 25th CT. But their inclusion only came after hefty fines of Rs. 100,000 each on the players. PHF inquiry committee had also recommended a one-year ban on the duo. But PHF President Gen. Muhammad Aziz Khan brought an amicable end to the controversy when he said that the under-fire players will compete in the CT in better national interest.

=== 2004 Olympics and world record ===
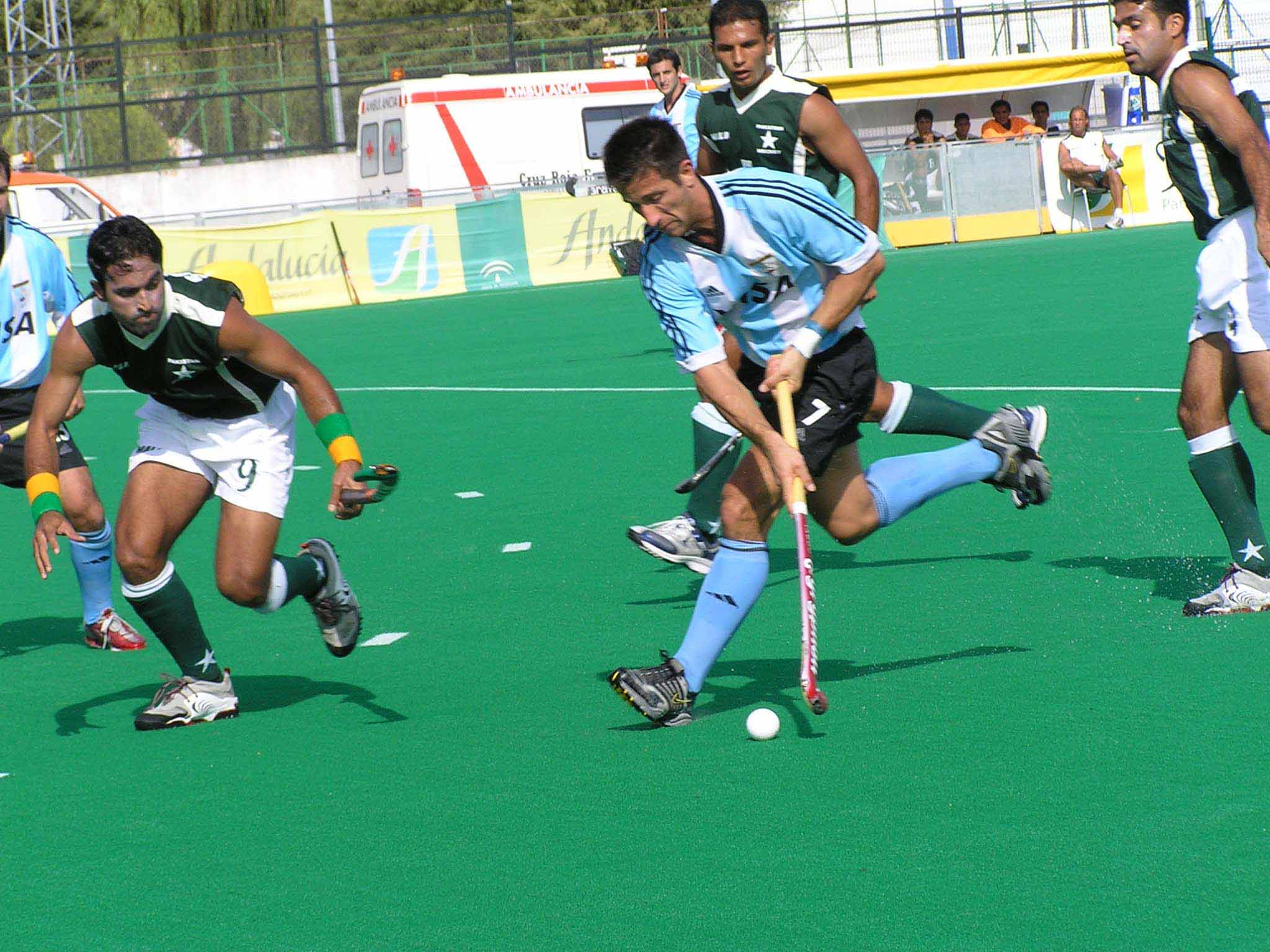
Abbas (left) challenging for the ball against Argentina at a tri nation tournament in Alacalá la Real, Spain in 2004

Sohail started 2004 in whirlwind fashion and won the top scorer award in 13th Azlan Shah Cup at Bukit Jalil Complex. He struck ten goals with the help of two hat tricks against India and Germany. He managed one double hat trick and 21 hat tricks in international modern hockey so far: a record unmatched in international field hockey. Sohail recorded 59 goals in 2004 and was well poised to break his own world record of most goals in calendar year (60 in 1999) before retirement. Sohail was the key figure when Pakistan won a place at the 2004 Summer Olympics by finishing third at the 2004 Olympic Qualifiers in Madrid on 13 March 2004. Three times Olympic Champion Pakistan also qualified Sohail was also leading marksman at Madrid with nine goals. Four of these nine goals were against India in league encounter when he converted four out of four penalty corners. At Athens, he became the record Pakistani goalscorer in a single Olympiad, beating the 10-goal record of centre-forward Hassan Sardar, created at the Los Angeles Olympiad twenty years beforehand. Only Sohail, Sardar and Abdul Rashid Jr. have topped the goal scoring-chart in Olympics hockey.

Abbas scored his 267th international goal during the Champions Trophy in Amritsar, India to equal the 22-year-old record of Dutch penalty corner specialist Paul Litjens on 4 October 2004 and then on 8 October he broke the Dutchman's record. He retired in December 2004, just after the Champions Trophy in Lahore along with another Pakistani great Waseem Ahmed, when he was only 27 years of age but on 4 July 2006, he decided to return to the international hockey. Since the summer of 2005 he and Waseem have both played for Dutch club Rotterdam. He struck his 33rd goal to break Mark Hager's 9-year-old record. His 33rd goal emerged from penalty-mark when he converted 66th-minute penalty-stroke against India in Pakistan's 2–1 win on fourth day of 26th Champions Trophy. The Australian striker had registered 32 goals from 1985 to 1995. He took 11 editions for his 32 goals while Sohail did the needful in his 6th CT and added another on 12 December tie to make his final Champions' Trophy total 34. Abbas immediately after the end of 2004 announced his retirement from international hockey saying he wants to retire while at his best form while keeping to option to come back if the national team needs him for major tournaments.

=== Coming out of retirement and 2006 World Cup ===
After retiring form the national team he missed all of the 2005 campaigns even the 2006 World Cup qualification in China but he was recalled for the tour of Europe and the 2006 Champions Trophy before the World Cup. Pakistan finished a disappointing sixth at the 2006 World Cup in Germany.

=== Comeback year and 2010 World Cup ===
After remaining out of national setup for two years and missing the 2008 Beijing Olympics Abbas was called back into the national squad for the 2009 Hockey Asia Cup where Pakistan lost the final to South Korea. Abbas helped secure qualification for the 2010 World Cup by winning the qualifiers in Lille, France, and later finished silver in the Hockey Champions Challenge I in Argentina. Despite good performances in the test series with Netherlands in previous months Pakistan finished their worst 12th at the 2010 World Cup in New Delhi managing to win just a match. Abbas first Major Gold Medal was in 2010 Asian Games held in China. Abbas's finest moment for Pakistan continued to be the 2010 Asian Games as he was part of the team which beat South Korea 4–3 on penalty strokes. Abbas however missed his penalty. Malaysia defeated India 4–3 and played Pakistan in the final. On 25 November 2010 the Malaysia v Pakistan final started during the 28th minute of the match Abbas scored a penalty corner to give Pakistan a 1–0 lead. Rehan Butt scored a goal 4 minutes after half time to extend the lead to 2–0. Malaysia failed to score and the whistle blew with Pakistan winning the 2010 Asian Games Hockey Tournament. This became Pakistan's first victory at the Asian Games since 1990 and their first victory in a major international tournament since the 1994 Champions Trophy. The 16-year drought ended and Pakistan and Sohail Abbas put a poor World Cup and Commonwealth Games behind them to give their country their first major trophy in 16 years.

=== Captaincy and 2012 Olympics ===
Abbas remained part of the team setup with the Olympics in mind. In 2011 he scored 19 goals for Pakistan. After serving Pakistan for almost 14 years, Abbas was awarded the captaincy of the national hockey side for the first time in the Azlan Shah Cup and London Olympics 2012. Abbas's side ended 7th (last) in the Azlan Shah 2012 tournament. Similarly, they ended the Olympics at the 7th position despite starting off with a draw against Spain. Sohail was dropped from the team after the Olympics. Later he announced his retirement from the national side.

=== Post-retirement ===
Despite multiple coaching offers from PHF Sohail declined taking part in any program working under the Pakistan Hockey management and kept a low profile. In October 2024 he took his first coaching role as an assistant coach for penalty corners for the Malaysia national team.

== Player profile ==
Sohail is regarded by many as the best short corner expert in world hockey. Argentina's Jorge Lombi and Netherlands's Taeke Taekema are second in line. He is a natural short corner expert with a very strong wrist, a powerful drag flick and a perfected dummy "body dodge" action. He was Pakistani candidate for the FIH Player of the Year award in 1999, 2000, 2001, 2003 and 2004.

"Sohail Abbas is the king of penalty corner because of his goal scoring record. He scored the most goals from penalty corners, so definitely he is the best in the world,"

— Taeke Taekema – Dutch drag-flick specialist

His tenure in the Netherlands contributed to his professional development. He has acknowledged the role of club manager Jons Hanset during this period.

Twelve goals in 5 matches and helped his team qualify for the play-offs was no mean feat and he has no hesitation in stating that Netherlands remains his favorite country to visit. Close to his mother, he describes her as "my greatest supporter. I credit her with all I have achieved."

Many of Sohail's contemporaries were in awe of his performances. Former India goal keeper, Jude Menezes recalls that Abbas was so confident of his ability that he could tell his opposing number which section of the goal he would target, and still make the shot.

=== Records ===
Sohail Abbas holds the following records in field hockey:

WORLD RECORDS:

- Highest goals scorer in modern field hockey with 348 goals.
- Highest number of goals in modern field hockey in a calendar year: 60 goals in 1999
- Fastest to score 100 goals in modern international hockey: two years six months and 18 days.
- Fastest to score 200 goals in modern international hockey: five years five months and 16 days.
- Highest number of goals in a single edition of Asia Cup
- He has scored a record 21 modern field hockey international hat tricks including one double hat trick.

== Career statistics ==
=== Club ===
Domestic
Club	Season	League			Ref
Club	Season	Division	Apps	Goals	Ref
Habib Bank	1997	National Hockey Championship	-	-	
Habib Bank	1998	National Hockey Championship	-	-	
Habib Bank	1999	National Hockey Championship	-	-	
Habib Bank	2001	National Hockey Championship	-	-	
Habib Bank	2002	National Hockey Championship	-	-	
WAPDA	2003	National Hockey Championship	-	-	
SSGC	2004	National Hockey Championship	-	-	
WAPDA	2004	National Hockey Championship	-	-	
WAPDA	2009	National Hockey Championship	-	-	
WAPDA	2010	National Hockey Championship	-	-	
WAPDA	2011	National Hockey Championship	-	-	
WAPDA	2012	National Hockey Championship	-	-	
WAPDA	2013	National Hockey Championship	-	-	
WAPDA	2014	National Hockey Championship	-	-	
WAPDA	2015	National Hockey Championship	-	-	
WAPDA	2016	National Hockey Championship	-	-	
WAPDA	2017	National Hockey Championship	-	-	
Abroad
Club	Season	League			Ref
Club	Season	Division	Apps	Goals	Ref
Amsterdam HBC	1999	Hoofdklasse	24	14	
BS Nasional HC	2002	Malaysia Hockey League	8	7	
Hyderabad Sultans	2005	Indian Premier Hockey League	7	7	
HC Rotterdam	2004-2005	Overgangsklasse	2	1	
HC Rotterdam	2005-2006	Hoofdklasse	22	20	
HC Rotterdam	2006-2007	Hoofdklasse	27	22	
HC Rotterdam	2007-2008	Hoofdklasse	25	22	
HC Rotterdam	2007-2008	Euro Hockey League	7	7	
HC Rotterdam	2008-2009	Hoofdklasse	26	19	
HC Rotterdam	2008-2009	Euro Hockey League	6	2	

=== International ===
Pakistan
Year	Caps	Goals
1998	31	20
1999	36	60
2000	21	26
2001	29	37
2002	36	44
2003	21	30
2004	50	59
2006	16	14
2009	15	17
2010	14	10
2011	26	21
2012	16	10
Total	311	348

== See also ==
- Pakistan Hockey Federation
- List of Pakistani field hockey players
- List of men's field hockey players with 100 or more international goals
