= Kamran Ahmed =

Andrology and urology researcher

Kamran Ahmed (MBBS, MRCS, PhD, FRCS Urol) is a professor and a urological surgeon who is affiliated with Sheikh Khalifa Medical City, Abu Dhabi, UAE, Khalifa University, Abu Dhabi and King's College London, United Kingdom.

== Career ==
Kamran has published more than 300 Medline indeed articles and publications of abstracts in medical journals. He is the editor of a number of medical education, simulation, surgical and urological textbooks and has written a number of book chapters. He has served on the Editorial Board of the British Journal of Urology International (BJUI). Kamran has a major interest in education, and has been the lead for Surgical Sciences iBSc modules at King's College London, the education lead for EULIS section of European Association of Urology (EAU), board member of Junior ERUS-EAU and tutor on the European Urology Resident Education Programme (EUREP).

He serves on the board of Frontiers in Reproductive Health journal as an associate editor for the Andrology section. He is also an associate board member of the European Association of Urology sections of EULIS and ESUT.

=== Prostate cancer ===
Kamran is the chief investigator of a first-of-its-kind trial that studies the impact of prostate cancer on men's well-being and mental health i.e. Mental well-being and quality of life in Prostate cancer (MIND-P). The MIND-P study is a multi-institutional collaboration across seven hospitals in London and the South of England. This trial is funded by King's Health Partners. The greatest disease impact on men's well-being has been reported to be at the time of the diagnosis of prostate cancer, with subsequent anxiety and concern about the disease progression. The trial is expected to be completed and disseminated in 2023.

=== Male infertility ===
Kamran has contributed significantly to the medical literature on the associations between male subfertility, mental well-being, and various oncological conditions

=== Medical Education ===
Kamran has contributed significantly to the medical education literature. Widely used scientifically developed and validated urology surgical curricula include Robot assisted prostatectomy training curriculum for prostate cancer surgery training, Radical nephrectomy curriculum for kidney cancer surgical training, and Percutaneous nephrolithotomy (PCNL) for kidney stone surgery training. He was the leading member of the team that conducted first international randomized controlled trial on association between surgical simulation and patient outcomes. Key areas that have been researched and developed include:

- Ward Round Assessment Tool (surgical ward round assessment tool - SWAT) . SWAT can be used to assess the quality of nontechnical surgical ward round skills of medical students and residents.

- Development and validation of a tool for non-technical skills evaluation in robotic surgery-the ICARS system . ICARS is the first non-technical skills (NTS) evaluation tool developed for the robot assisted surgery.

- Development and content validation of the Urethroplasty Training and Assessment Tool (UTAT) for dorsal onlay buccal mucosa graft urethroplasty . This is the first of its kind technical skills assessment tool for trainee surgeons who are in the phase of learning reconstructive urethral surgery.

== Research work ==
He is one of the key members of the team that introduced the first simulation-based surgical and urology resident education Training Programme at King's College London and Guy's Hospital, London. He was the leading member of the team that set up clinic-based care for urethral stricture patients at a level 1 trauma centre, King's College Hospital, London The services included care of trauma and non-trauma related urethral injuries. He significantly contributed to training and education at the organisations like European Association of Urology (EAU), IRCAD centre (Taiwan), and Karl- Storz training centre, Berlin Germany.

== Books ==
- Surgical Simulation Anthem Press (Co-editors: Prokar Dasgupta, Kamran Ahmed, Peter Jaye, M Shamim Khan) Jan 2014. ISBN 1783081562
- Introduction to Surgery for Students; Springer Publisher (Co-editors: Rebecca Fisher, Kamran Ahmed, Prokar Dasgupta) 2017, ISBN 978-3-319-43210-6
- Management of Small Renal Masses; Springer Publisher (Co-editors: Kamran Ahmed, Nicholas Raison, Ben Challacombe, Alexandre Mottrie, Prokar Dasgupta); 2017, ISBN 978-3-319-65657-1
- Men's Health and Wellbeing; Springer Publisher (Co-editors: Sanchia S. Goonewardene; Oliver Brunckhorst; David Albala; Kamran Ahmed); 2022 ISBN 9783030847517
- Penile Cancer – A Practical Guide; Springer Publisher (Co-editors: Oliver Brunckhorst, Kamran Ahmed, Asif Muneer, Hussain M Alnajjar); 2023; 978-3-031-32680-6

== Selected publications ==
- Is minimally invasive surgery beneficial in the management of esophageal cancer? A meta-analysis, K Nagpal, K Ahmed, A Vats, D Yakoub, D James, H Ashrafian, A Darzi, Surgical endoscopy 24, 1621-1629 398 2010
- Tozsin A, Ucmak H, Soyturk S, Aydin A, Gozen AS, Fahim MA, Güven S, Ahmed K. The Role of Artificial Intelligence in Medical Education: A Systematic Review. Surg Innov. 2024 Aug;31(4):415-423. doi: 10.1177/15533506241248239. Epub 2024 Apr 17. PMID: 38632898.
- Current trends in the diagnosis and management of renal nutcracker syndrome: a review, K Ahmed, R Sampath, MS Khan, European Journal of Vascular and Endovascular Surgery 31 (4), 410-416, 325, 2006
- Catastrophizing: a predictive factor for postoperative pain, RS Khan, K Ahmed, E Blakeway, P Skapinakis, L Nihoyannopoulos, The American journal of surgery 201 (1), 122-131, 317, 2011
- A single-centre early phase randomised controlled three-arm trial of open, robotic, and laparoscopic radical cystectomy (CORAL) MS Khan, C Gan, K Ahmed, AF Ismail, J Watkins, JA Summers, European urology 69 (4), 613-621, 288, 2016
- Analysis of intracorporeal compared with extracorporeal urinary diversion after robot-assisted radical cystectomy: results from the International Robotic Cystectomy Consortium, K Ahmed, SA Khan, MH Hayn, PK Agarwal, KK Badani, MD Balbay, European urology 65 (2), 340-347 284 2014
- Current status of validation for robotic surgery simulators–a systematic review, H Abboudi, MS Khan, O Aboumarzouk, KA Guru, B Challacombe, BJU international 111 (2), 194-205 266 2013
- Observational tools for assessment of procedural skills: a systematic review, K Ahmed, D Miskovic, A Darzi, T Athanasiou, GB Hanna The American Journal of Surgery 202 (4), 469-480. e6 262 2011
- Altunhan A, Soyturk S, Guldibi F, Tozsin A, Aydın A, Aydın A, Sarica K, Guven S, Ahmed K. Artificial intelligence in urolithiasis: a systematic review of utilization and effectiveness. World J Urol. 2024 Oct 17;42(1):579. doi: 10.1007/s00345-024-05268-8. PMID: 39417840.
