= Adam Sinclair (field hockey) =

Indian field hockey player

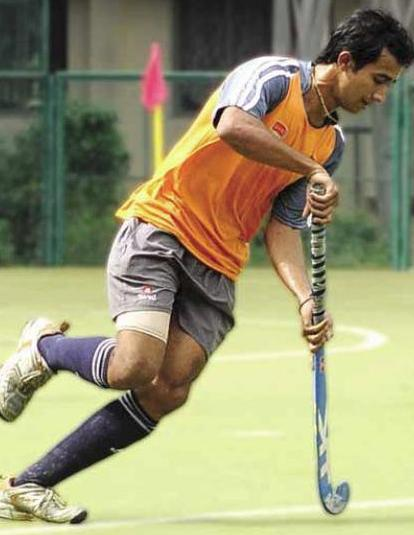

Personal information
- Full name: Adam Antony Sinclair
- Born: 29 February 1984 (age 42) Coimbatore, Tamil Nadu, India
- Height: 5 ft 10 in (1.78 m)

Sport
- Sport: Field hockey
- Position: Forward
Senior career
Years	Team	Caps	Goals
2005-2008	Chennai Veerans	-	-
2007	Schwarz – Weiss Köln	-	-
2006	IOB	-	-
–	Chennai Cheetahs	-	9
National team
Years	Team	Caps	Goals
–	India	90	-

Adam Antony Sinclair (born 29 February 1984) is an Indian former field hockey player from Tamil Nadu. He represented the India men's national field hockey team as a forward, earning 90 international caps. Sinclair competed at the 2004 Summer Olympics in Athens and the 2006 Asian Games in Doha, Qatar, and also represented India at the Men's Hockey Champions Trophy.

== Early life ==
Sinclair hails from Coimbatore. While at school, he was the best in field hockey at Stanes Anglo Indian Higher Secondary School, Coimbatore. He captained the school team and led the school to win many tournaments. He was elected Head Boy for 2001. He was also the captain of the "Panthers" and led them to victory in the Intra School Sports Event in 2001. He did further studies in PSG College of Arts and Science, Coimbatore.

== Career ==
He made his international debut in May 2004 during a Four Nation Tournament in Gifu (Japan). Sinclair has played for the Chennai Veerans, Chennai Cheetahs has played club hockey in Germany, and as of September 2011 was playing center-forward for the Indian Overseas Bank hockey team. Sinclair is the most recent Olympian in men's field hockey from the Indian state of Tamil Nadu. In 2021, he highlighted the need for greater grassroots development of hockey in the state.

=== Athletics ===
Sinclair has also won accolades and medals as an athlete in the triple jump, high jump and long distance running events.

== Personal life ==
Adam Sinclair became engaged to long time girlfriend Vyshali Nair on 6 May 2011. They were married in April and May 2012 in Hindu and Catholic ceremonies held in Chennai and Coimbatore, respectively. The couple have two children: a son, Zoran (born 2013), and a daughter, Zaya (born 2017).Their son, Zoran Sinclair, is an Indian youth triathlete who represented India in the boys' under-15 category at the 2026 Asia Triathlon Super Sprint U15 Championships held in Xuzhou, China. The children's names are of multiple origins and the first syllables of their names were the inspiration for Adam's sportswear and equipment brand and Sports academy ZOZA.
