= Paul Blake (field hockey) =

South African field hockey player

Paul Blake (born 16 April 1983) is a South African field hockey player who competed in the 2008 Summer Olympics. For 100 days, beginning 23 October 2013, he pulled a cart (unassisted) by foot across India from Mumbai to Everest Base Camp – a 2,000 km (1,243-mile) journey. He then taught in Hong Kong in West Island School, after leaving shortly in two years.
