= Orissa Steelers =

The Orissa Steelers are the winners of the Premier Hockey League 2007, India's former national level field hockey tournament. The originally proposed name for the team was Rourkela Steelers, after the city which is said to be the hockey Capital of Orissa.

They participated in the tournament for the first time in 2006, when it had two tiers. They won the First Division title that year. In 2007, the two-tier system was replaced by a single-tier system, and Orissa Steelers was admitted as one of the seven teams. The others were Hyderabad Sultans, Maratha Warriors, Sher-e-Punjab, Chandigarh Dynamos, Chennai Veerans, and Bangalore Lions.

Orissa Steelers went on to win 10 of their 12 matches in the league to top the regular season. In the best-of-three finals, they won the title and the prize money of Rs 4 million by beating Sher-e-Punjab twice while losing to them once. Dilip Tirkey, the captain of the Orissa Steelers, was awarded player of the tournament in PHL 2007.

== Team in PHL 2007 ==
- Dilip Tirkey (captain)
- Salman Akbar
- Daman Deep Singh
- Prabodh Tirkey
- Roshan Minz
- Samir Dad
- Sunil Ekka
- Jitender Saroha
- William Xalxo
- Bimal Lakra
- Jasbir Singh
- Adnan Zakir
- Mario Almada
- Tjeerd Steller
- Sunil Yadav
- Bruno H. Lugun
- Birender Lakra
- Prem Kumar
- Dinesh Ekka

Officials

- A. K. Bansal (Chief coach)
- Pranab K. Pattnaik (Asst. coach)
- Mukti Prasad Das (Physio)
- Pratap Satpathy (Manager)

== Performance in 2007 ==
Matches: 12

Won: 10

Lost: 2

Goals for: 29

Goals against: 12

Points: 28

Position: Champions

- Chandigarh Dynamos: 1-0 (extra time)
- Chennai Veerans: 2-1
- Hyderabad Sultans: 1-0
- Sher-e-Punjab: 1-2
- Bangalore Lions: 3-0
- Maratha Warriors: 2-0
- Hyderabad Sultans: 2-0
- Bangalore Lions: 3-4
- Chandigarh Dynamos: 4-2
- Sher-e-Punjab 4-2 (shootout)
- Maratha Warriors: 4-1
- Chennai Veerans: 5-1
