= Chennai Veerans =

Field hockey team in India

The Chennai Veerans was a Tier-1 level field hockey team Premier Hockey League in India. In the inaugural cup in 2005, the Chennai Veerans led by Ignace Tirkey finished at the bottom of the group with two wins and six losses.

Chennai Veerans were relegated to Tier-II division of PHL in 2006, where they played along with Orissa Steelers, Lucknow Nawabs, Delhi Dazzlers and Imphal Rangers. In this league Chennai Veerans finished runners-up to Orissa Steelers. It was later decided that in 2007 no team should be relegated from Tier I.

== Players for 2005 ==
- Ignace Tirkey (Captain)
- Devesh Chauhan (G.K.)
- Rajarajan (G.K)
- William Xalxo
- Nitin Kumar
- Jagath Jothi
- Vivek Gupta
- Bimal Lakra
- Prabakaran
- Jagan Senthil
- Adam Sinclair
- Venkatesh
- Raja
- Birender Lakra
- Sundeep Singh
- Dilawar Hussain (Pakistan)
- Zeeshan Ashraf (Pakistan)
- Juan Escarré (Spain)
- Harender Singh (Chief coach)
- Rama Swamy (Asst. coach)
- Saju Joseph (Trainer)
- Venkatachalam (Stand in manager)
- T.A. Jabaratnam (Manager)

== Results of Chennai Veerans ==
- 2005 - 5th place in Tier-I Premier division
- 2006 - 2nd place in Tier-II division
- 2007 - 6th place of Tier-I Premier division.
