= Bangalore Hi-Fliers =

- Bangalore Hi-fliers emblem
- Full name: Bangalore Hi-Fliers
- League: Premier Hockey League
- Founded: 2005
- Dissolved: 2008
- Home ground: Bangalore Hockey Stadium (Capacity 1,000)

Personnel
- Captain: Tushar Khandekar
- Manager: Kannan Krishnamurthy

The Bangalore Hi-Fliers were a Premier Hockey League (PHL) team, based in Bangalore, Karnataka. Initially known as the Bangalore Lions, the team was led by Tushar Khandekar. The Hi-Fliers won the PHL twice, in 2006 and in 2008, more than any other team.

== History ==
=== Founding ===
The club was formed on the back grounds of inaugural Premier Hockey League in year 2005. It started off with many host of hockey superstars from India, Pakistan and Malaysia. Hi-Fliers is the only teams who in every edition of the PHL displayed tactical and strategic hockey. They have had a good mix of young and experienced players. In the first edition at Hyderabad, their squad had as many as seven members from the national team. They played well in the first leg but failed to maintain the same tempo in the second set of matches and finished a disappointing fourth in the first edition.

=== Change of name and rise ===
The Bangalore Lions

In the year 2006 ING Life Insurance became the official team sponsor of Bangalore Hi-fliers and the team was re-christened as Bangalore Lions in the second and third edition. Lions went on to win league in 2006 and in 2007 they finished third, before going back to the original name in PHL - IV and again winning league.

=== Lions era (2006–2007) ===
The Bangalore Lions team after winning the Premier Hockey League in 2006

Team's name was changed to Lions in 2006, the team played brilliantly throughout and finished as the second team in the league to enter the best-of-three finals and pipped local favourites Chandigarh Dynamos to win the second edition. In the third final, Bangalore's Hariprasad scored a classic goal - that one effort earned him a place in the Indian team for the Asian Games and the World Cup. In the third edition, Bangalore failed to make it to the final by three points and finished third.

=== 2008 ===
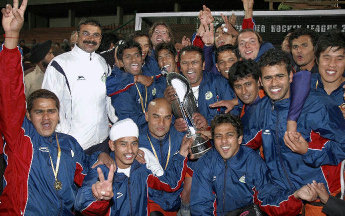
The Bangalore Hi-fliers team after winning the Premier Hockey League in 2008

Team's name was again changed in 2008 and they were now called Bangalore Hi-fliers. Hi-fliers went on to win the league in 2008. The greatest strength of the team is their star penalty corner specialist Len Aiyappa. The bald-pated drag flick expert collected the Top Scorer award in the first 2005. The team's fortunes depend on the ability of their forwardline to get enough short corners for Len to click. Bangalore had eight internationals in their team and is also served by one of the best goalkeepers in the country, Bharath Kumar Chetri. Its Korean import You Hyo-sik has the ability to make speedy runs and he was an asset to the team. They also had two more foreign players Oliver Rutgers and Sebastian Westerholt from the Netherlands. Skipper Tushar Khandekar was the star to watch in the forward line and he has the seasoned and talented Sandeep Michael and Hariprasad to bolster the attack. Sunil and Cheyanna, two upcoming youngsters are the ones to watch out for in the frontline. Former skipper Arjun Halappa had the ability to play as an attacking midfielder and they had Bimal Lakra, a trusted soldier in the midfield, as the fulcrum of the team's fortunes - who was also ably assisted by VS Vinay. With a mix of good players in all the departments who have the ability to play tactical modern hockey, Bangalore Hi-Fliers looked good for another shot at the title and they did what was expected from them. With their chief coach Ramesh Parameswaran joining the national duties, assistant coach and Olympian Ashish Ballal was in-charge of the coaching staff with another Junior India coach Edward Brient to assist him. Another former international CS Poonacha was the fitness trainer with the secretary of the Karnataka Hockey Association K Krishnamurthy as manager.

== Season by season performance ==
Season	Played	Won	Draw	Lost	ET-W	ET-L	GF	GA	GD	Points	position
2005	8	3	0	5	-	-	19	22	-3	9	Fourth
2006	8	5	0	3	-	-	16	12	4	13	Second (league), Champions (play-offs)
2007	12	5	0	4	2	1	24	26	-2	20	Third
2008	6	4	0	1	1	0	13	10	3	14	Second (league), Champions (play-offs)

== Players ==
As of 2008

Name	Country
Tushar Khandekar (Captain)	(India)
Bharat Chettri	(India)
Len Aiyappa	(India)
P T Rao	(India)
Ajay Kumar Saroha	(India)
Arjun Halappa	(India)
Vinaya V S	(India)
Bimal Lakra	(India)
Vikram Kanth	(India)
Cheeyanna	(India)
Hari Prasad	(India)
S V Sunil	(India)
K A Nilesh	(India)
Kamarjit Singh	(India)
Olivier Rutgers	(Netherlands)
Sebastian Westerhout	(Netherlands)
Hyo Kim	(South Korea)

Note: The list of players was obtained from the PHL website.

Personnel

- (India) Ramesh Parameswaran (Chief coach)
- (India) Ashish Ballal (Asst. Coach)
- (India) Kannan Krishnamurthy (General manager)
- (India) Poonacha C S (Trainer)

=== Former players ===
Former players
Name	Career	Country
Kuttappa	2005	(India)
Irshad Ali	2005	(India)
Chandrasekhar Xalxo	2005	(India)
Pawal Lakra	2005	(India)
Amar Aiyamma	2005 and 2007	(India)
Sabu Varkey	2005–2007	(India)
Sunil Ekka	2005	(India)
Ravi Kumar	2006	(India)
Ignace Tirkey	2006–2007	(India)

Former players
Name	Career	Country
Mommahad Waqas	2007	(India)
Gurpreet Singh	2007	(India)
Paul Blake	2007	(India)
Laxman Rao NP	2007	(India)
Bikramjit Singh	2007	(India)
Suresh Kumar	2006–2007	(India)
Bimal Lakra	2006–2008	(India)
Prabodh Tirkey	2005–2007	(India)
Bipin Fernandes	2006	(India)

=== Club captains ===
Dates	Name	Country
2005–2007	Arjun Halappa	(India)
2008	Tushar Khandekar	(India)

=== International players ===
International players
Name	Career	Country
Kuhan Shanmugunathan	2005	(Malaysia)
Mudassar Ali Khan	2005–2006	(Pakistan)
Rehan Butt	2006	(Pakistan)
Jordi Quintana	2006	(Spain)
Paul Blake	2007	(Australia)

International Players
Name	Career	Country
Thijs de Greeff	2007	(Netherlands)
Sander van der Weide	2007	(Netherlands)
Olivier Rutgers	2008	(Netherlands)
Sebastian Westerhout	2008	(Netherlands)
Hyo Kim	2008	(South Korea)

== Honours ==
- Premier Hockey League: 2
  - 2006, 2008
