= Maratha Warriors =

- League: Premier Hockey League
- Colors: Red, black, and white
- Home ground: Mahindra Hockey Stadium, Pune

Personnel
- Coach: Mukul Pandey
- Manager: James Peter Ekka

The Maratha Warriors were a field hockey team from Maharashtra, India that competed in the now defunct Premier Hockey League.

== Players ==
Name	Country	Position
Adrian D'Souza	(India)	Goalkeeper
Gurpreet Singh	(India)	Goalkeeper
Anurag Raghuvanshi	(India)	Fullback
Kuldeep Singh	(India)	Fullback
Ajmer Singh	(India)	Fullback
Imran Warsi	(Pakistan)	Fullback
Gurbaj Singh	(India)	Half back
Dhananjay Mahadik	(India)	Half back
Viren Rasquinha	(India)	Half back
Gaurav Tokhi	(India)	Half back
Conroy Remedios	(India)	Half back
Gurvinder Singh Chandi	(India)	Forward
Hemant Gethe	(India)	Forward
Stanley Fernandes	(India)	Forward
Bharat Kumar	(India)	Forward
Shivender Singh	(India)	Forward
Jamie Dwyer	(Australia)	Forward
Hardeep Singh	(India)	Forward

Note: The list of players was obtained from the PHL website. The list may change in the near future.

=== Personnel ===
- (India) Mukul Pandey (Head coach)
- (India) Murugappan (Asst. coach)
- (India) James Peter Ekka (General manager)
- (India) Ramesh Pillai (Trainer)

== Results ==
Season	Played	Won	Lost	Goals for	Goals against	Goal difference	Points	Final standing
2005	8	4	4	17	18	-1	13	3rd
2006	8	3	5	11	15	-4	8	5th
2007	12	7(4-ET)	5(2-ET)	19	20	-1	19	4th

Note:- ET is win/loss in extra time
