= Chandigarh Dynamos =

Indian hockey team

Chandigarh Dynamoes
- League: Premier Hockey League
- Division: First Division
- Based in: Chandigarh
- Stadium: Sector 42 Stadium
- Colours: Black and Yellow
- Head coach: N.S.Sodhi
- General manager: Amarjeeth Singh

Chandigarh Dynamos were a Premier Hockey League team based in Chandigarh, Punjab. The team captain was Rajpal Singh.

== History ==
During the 2004 season, the Chandigarh Dynamos played in tier 2. Their goalkeeper Gurkirat Mann was adjudged the best goalkeeper for the 2004 season. Following their win, they were promoted to tier 1, where they finished runners-up in the 2006 season. In the 2008 season, the Dynamos finished runners-up.

== Team line-up ==
The squad as of 20 December 2004 is as follows.

Name	Country	Position
Baljit Singh	(India)	Goalkeeper
Gurkirat Maan	(India)	Goalkeeper
Swinder Singh	(India)	Goalkeeper
Jugraj Singh	(India)	Full back
Anmolak Singh	(India)	Full back
Sajjad Anwar	(Pakistan)	Full back
Harwinder Singh	(India)	Half back
Lloyd Scott	(Australia)	Half back
Jaswinder Singh	(India)	Half back
Irshad Ali	(India)	Half back
Prabhjot Singh	(India)	Forward
Balder Bomans	(Netherlands)	Forward
Mandeep Singh	(India)	Forward
Ravi Pal Singh	(India)	Forward
Rajpal Singh	(India)	Forward
Prabhjot Singh	(India)	Forward
Timo Bruinsma	(Netherlands)	Forward
Sher Singh	(India)	Forward
Navdeep Singh	(India)	Forward
Inderjeet Chadha	(India)	Forward
Deepak Thakur	(India)	Forward

=== Other important team personnel ===
- (India) N S Sodhi (Chief Coach)
- (India) Saurabh Bishnoi (assistant coach)
- (India) Sarvesh Sharma (Physical Trainer)
- (India) Amarjeet Singh (general manager)

== Results ==
Season	Played	Won	Lost	Goals for	Goals against	Goal difference	Points	Final standing
2005 (Tier-II)	8							1st (Promoted to tier-I)
2006 (Tier-I)	8							2nd
2007	12	5 (1-ET)	7 (3-ET)	18	17	1	17	5th

Note:- ET is win/loss in extra time
