= Premier Hockey League =

Indian Field Hockey League

- Sport: Field Hockey
- Founded: 2005
- Folded: 2008
- No. of teams: 7: Hyderabad Sultans; Sher-e-Jalandhar; Maratha Warriors; Bangalore Lions; Chandigarh Dynamos; Chennai Veerans; Orissa Steelers
- Country: India
- Last champion: Bangalore Hi-fliers
- Most titles: Bangalore Hi-fliers (2 titles)
- Broadcaster: ESPN
- Website: premierhockeyleague.com

Premier Hockey League (PHL) was a professional field hockey league in India. There were seven teams in the PHL. The competition was held every year from 2005 until 2008.

== History ==
Bangalore Lions after winning PHL in 2006

The competition conceptualized by Anurag Dahiya of ESPN Star Sports was created and promoted in partnership with Leisure Sports Management (LSM) and sanctioned by Indian Hockey Federation (IHF). It was first played in 2005 involving 5 teams with active support from sports channel ESPN India. First season had two tiers division 1 and division 2 but from 2007 season onwards division 2 was scrapped. Except team winning 2006 division 2 championship rest all teams in division 2 were scrapped. The competition was disbanded in 2008.

The 5 inaugural members of the new Premier Hockey League in 2005 were Bangalore Hi-Fliers, Chennai Veerans, Hyderabad Sultans, Maratha Warriors and Sher-e-Jalandhar.

== Competition ==
=== Format ===
Regular season of PHL ran between December and January. Since the inaugural season, the format has varied regularly. According to the last format, each team played each other once in a single round robin format (21 matches) in the regular league season, then the top four play the semifinals (1 vs. 4 and 2 vs. 3), followed by the finals, adopting a best of three format. There was a total of 26 matches for each session.

During a PHL match, points that contribute to team standings could be earned in the following ways:

- Result in regulation time
  - 3 points to the winner
  - 0 point to the loser
- Result after extra time
  - 2 points to the winner
  - 1 point to the loser

In case of no winner has been decided after completion of a match and two periods of extra time, the winner of the match will be determined by a shoot-out competition.

=== New features ===
The fundamental aberration from the format of normal hockey games is the number of sessions. A normal 70-minute hockey game includes two sessions, each of 35 minutes each. The PHL had four sessions each of 17.5 minutes. This format was tailor-made to include more advertising time in order to generate funds.

If the match is deadlocked after full-time, the number of players of each team got gradually reduced till a result is obtained. A win within full-time fetched three points, whereas a win after full-time fetched two points to the winning team and one to the losing team. Each team was allowed to field up to five international players.

In addition, another feature of the PHL for the year 2007 was a modified penalty shootout competition, modelled similar to the ice hockey. Each team had five penalties. The player can take as many shots possible within the stipulated 8 secs.

Another interesting feature of PHL were timeouts. Each team was allowed 2 x 120 second timeouts per team in regulation time. These timeouts were mandatory and had to be taken once in each half of play. There would have been a warning from the bench 5 minutes before the end of the second/fourth quarter if the team has still not availed of the mandatory timeout. 2 minutes from the end of the second/fourth quarter the timeout could be imposed by the technical bench if the team has still not availed of it.

In addition, each team was allowed 1 x 2 minute timeout which could be taken at any point in time during the regulation time.

== Players ==
A team consisted of maximum of 18 (eighteen) players to be registered with PHDPL. At any given point of time, minimum 2 players of foreign origin shall be within the field of play during the course of a game.

=== International players ===
There are a number of players from countries other than India, who have been contracted to play in the league.

== Results ==
- 2005: Hyderabad Sultans
- 2006: Bangalore Lions
  - Chandigarh Dynamos finished 1st in the league table.
- 2007: Orissa Steelers
  - Orissa Steelers also finished 1st in the league table.
- 2008: Bangalore Hi-fliers
  - Chandigarh Dynamos finished 1st in the league table.

== Impact and legacy ==
At the time of launch, many in the Indian hockey circles were delighted with the intention of reviving the flagging sport. Experts accused the Indian Hockey Federation of being too lethargic and bureaucratic in popularizing the sport. Hockey players of the likes of Sohail Abbas excited a number of youngsters and drew them towards the game. Critics argued that traditional hockey bastions such as Kodagu, Jharkhand, Odisha and parts of Punjab were ignored and the organizers stated that in due course of time more teams would be included.

PHL did gain some ground in popular culture. Famously, in a scene in the hit Bollywood movie, Chak De! India, a character could be spotted wearing a PHL fan jersey. The league also had a long-lasting impact on the sport of field hockey globally, and commercial leagues in other sports that followed PHL in India. In field hockey, the biggest shift was the move away from 2 halves of 35 minutes each to 4 quarters of 17.5 minutes each. This measure, originally pioneered by PHL as quickening the pace of the game, has survived to this day. PHL's introduction of franchise teams This served as a template for later sports leagues including the IPL.

However, after 4 successful seasons, the Premier Hockey League ceased to exist. It has made way to another similar formatted tournament, the Hockey India League.

== See also ==
- World Series Hockey
- Hockey in India
- India men's national field hockey team
- India women's national field hockey team
- Premier Hockey League (South Africa)
