= Field hockey at the 2017 SEA Games =

- Venue: National Hockey Stadium
- Date: 22–29 August 2017

The field hockey competitions at the 2017 SEA Games in Kuala Lumpur will take place at National Hockey Stadium in Bukit Jalil.

The 2017 Games feature competitions in two events (one event for each gender).

== Competition schedule ==
The following was the competition schedule for the field hockey competitions:

G	Group stage	B	3rd place play-off	F	Final

Event	Mon 21	Tue 22	Wed 23	Thu 24	Fri 25	Sat 26	Sun 27	Mon 28		Tue 29	
Men		G	G	G	G	G	G			B	F
Women	G	G	G	G	G	G		B	F		

== Participation ==
=== Participating nations ===
- Indonesia
- Malaysia
- Myanmar
- Singapore
- Thailand

== Men's competition ==
=== Group stage ===
Pos	Team	Pld	W	D	L	GF	GA	GD	Pts	Final Result
1	Malaysia (H)	4	4	0	0	39	2	+37	12	Advanced to Gold medal match
2	Myanmar	4	2	1	1	8	10	−2	7	Advanced to Gold medal match
3	Singapore	4	2	1	1	12	17	−5	7	Advanced to Bronze medal match
4	Thailand	4	0	1	3	6	15	−9	1	Advanced to Bronze medal match
5	Indonesia	4	0	1	3	7	28	−21	1	

Updated to match(es) played on 27 August 2017. Source: KL2017 Official Website
Rules for classification: 1) points; 2) goal difference; 3) goals scored; 4) head-to-head result.
(H) Hosts

== Women's competition ==
=== Group stage ===
Pos	Team	Pld	W	D	L	GF	GA	GD	Pts	Qualification
1	Malaysia (H)	4	4	0	0	30	0	+30	12	Advanced to Gold Medal Match
2	Thailand	4	2	1	1	7	5	+2	7	Advanced to Gold Medal Match
3	Singapore	4	2	0	2	7	7	0	6	Advanced to Bronze Medal Match
4	Indonesia	4	1	1	2	4	16	−12	4	Advanced to Bronze Medal Match
5	Myanmar	4	0	0	4	0	20	−20	0	

Updated to match(es) played on 26 August 2017. Source: KL2017 Official Website
Rules for classification: 1) points; 2) goal difference; 3) goals scored; 4) head-to-head result.
(H) Hosts

== Medal summary ==
=== Medal table ===
* Host nation (Malaysia)

Rank	Nation	Gold	Silver	Bronze	Total
1	Malaysia*	2	0	0	2
2	Myanmar	0	1	0	1
2	Thailand	0	1	0	1
4	Singapore	0	0	2	2
Totals (4 entries)		2	2	2	6

=== Medalists ===
Event	Gold	Silver	Bronze
Men's tournament	Malaysia (MAS); Muhamad Ramadan Rosli; Muhammad Marhan Jalil; Mohammad Fitri Saari; Joel Samuel van Huizen; Faizal Saari; Mohamad Sukri Abdul Mutalib; Nabil Fiqri Mohammad Noor; Kumar Subramaniam; Muhammad Razie Abdul Rahim; Faiz Helmi Jali; Muhammad Azri Hassan; Meor Muhamad Azuan Hasan; Muhammad Hafizuddin Othman; Tengku Ahmad Tajuddin; Nik Muhammad Aiman Rozemi; Muhammad Shahril Saabah; Muhammad Rashid Baharom; Mohamad Izad Hakimi Jamaluddin	Myanmar (MYA); Aung Myo Thu; Thant Zin Oo; Aye Myint Ko; Zar Ni; Hein Min Zaw; Sit Nyein Aye; Than Htut Win; Thein Htike Oo; Thet Htwe; Thein Htike Aung; Thet Paing Tun; Nay Shein; Soe Lin Aung; Ko Wai; Nyein Chan Aung; Pyae Sone Lin; Maung Hein; Ko Ko Lin	Singapore (SGP); Wee Wei Xuan; Muhammad Fazly Abdul Rahman; Enrico Elifh Marican; Jaspal Singh Grewal; Dineshraj Vijayan Naidu; Akash Prebhash Chandra; Silas Abdul Razak Noor Shah; Nur Ashriq Ferdaus Zul'kepli; Ian James Valence Vanderput; Norman Teo; Tan Yi-Ru; Mohamad Farhan Kamsani; Muhammad Fazri Jailani; Muhammad Aidil Ibrahim; Muhammad Hafiz Abdul Rased; Gary Lee Quan Hua; Mohammed Sabri Yuhari; Hazmi Ibrahim
Women's tournament	Malaysia (MAS); Farah Ayuni Yahya; Nuraini Abdul Rashid; Nuraslinda Said; Nurul Nabihah Mansur; Noor Hasliza Ali; Raja Norsharina Shahbuddin; Siti Noor Amarina Ruhani; Juliani Din; Norbaini Hashim; Norazlin Sumantri; Hanis Nadiah Onn; Surizan Awang Noh; Nur Zafirah Aziz; Nur Syafiqah Zain; Mas Huzaimah Aziz; Siti Rahmah Othman; Wan Norfaiezah Saiuti; Fatin Shafika Sukri	Thailand (THA); Alisa Narueangram; Praphatson Khuiklang; Jenjira Kijpakdee; Kanyanut Nakpolkrung; Sirikwan Wongkeaw; Onuma Doungsuda; Pornsuree Toemsombatbowon; Akamsiri Gasornjan; Khwanchanok Suksin; Jongjit Boonmee; Natthakarn Aunjai; Boonta Duangurai; Supansa Samanso; Ornpanee Watcharoen; Thipvicha Jangiawechai; Anongnat Piresram; Kornkanok Sanpoung; Siraya Yimkrajang	Singapore (SGP); Taylor Liu Yu Tong; Nur Atiqah Abdullah Rahim; Tiffany Ong Zi Ting; Ivy Chan Ai Wei; Chua Xinni; Tam Wang Ting; Ho Puay Ling; Nurul Sofia Atikah Saban; Hajaratih Johana; Toh Li Min; Laura Tan Si Ru; Cheryll Chia; Felissa Lai Shiqi; Jerelee Ong Yan Ting; Rhys Wong Sze Hwee; Nur Syaheeza Mohd Jefri; Syasya Rifqah Sanip; Gene Leck Yuan Jie
