= Hockey RaboTrophy =

International field hockey tournament

- Most recent season or competition: 2018 Women's Hockey RaboTrophy
- Sport: Field hockey
- Founded: M: 2002; W: 2003
- Folded: 2018
- No. of teams: 4–8
- Continent: FIH (International)
- Last champions: M: Netherlands (2nd title); W: Netherlands (3rd title)
- Most titles: M: Netherlands (2 titles); W: Netherlands (3 titles)

The Hockey RaboTrophy was an international field hockey tournament held by the Koninklijke Nederlandse Hockey Bond (KNHB).

== History ==
The HockeyRabo Trophy was founded in 2002 by the KNHB. The first edition featured only a men's tournament, while a women's competition was introduced in 2003. In 2003, the competition was formed into a supplementary tournament of the Hockey Champions Trophy.

Throughout the years, the format of competition has changed, with some editions comprising only a sing round-robin format, while others have comprised a classification round to determine final rankings.

There were four men's and five women's tournaments hosted in the competition's 15–year history. The Netherlands men and women were the most successful teams in the RaboTrophy, winning two and three titles, respectively.

== Men's tournament ==
=== Summaries ===
Year	Hosts	Gold Medal Match			Third and Fourth		
Year	Hosts	Champions	Score	Runners-up	Third place	Score	Fourth place
2002	Amsterdam	Netherlands	round-robin	Australia	South Korea	round-robin	India
2004	Amsterdam	Germany	5–4	Netherlands	Pakistan	5–3	India
2005	Amsterdam	Pakistan	4–3	Australia	Spain	2–1	South Korea
2011	Amsterdam	Netherlands	round-robin	England	Germany	round-robin	Pakistan

=== Team appearances ===
Team	2002	2004	2005	2011	Total
Australia	2nd	–	2nd	–	2
England	–	–	8th	2nd	2
Germany	–	1st	6th	3rd	3
India	4th	4th	7th	–	3
Netherlands	1st	2nd	5th	1st	4
Pakistan	–	3rd	1st	4th	3
South Korea	3rd	–	4th	–	2
Spain	–	–	3rd	–	1
Total	4	4	8	4	20

== Women's tournament ==
=== Summaries ===
Year	Hosts	Gold Medal Match			Third and Fourth		
Year	Hosts	Champions	Score	Runners-up	Third place	Score	Fourth place
2003	Amsterdam	Australia	2–1	Netherlands	Argentina	4–2	Germany
2004	Amsterdam	Netherlands	round-robin	South Korea	China	round-robin	Germany
2008	Rotterdam	Netherlands	5–0	Great Britain	South Africa	5–1	India
2010	Various	Argentina	3–0	Netherlands	New Zealand	3–2	China
2018	Breda	Netherlands	8–2	Japan	Spain	5–1	China

=== Team appearances ===
Team	2003	2004	2008	2010	2018	Total
Argentina	3rd	–	–	1st	–	2
Australia	1st	–	–	–	–	1
China	–	3rd	–	4th	4th	3
Germany	4th	4th	–	–	–	2
Great Britain	–	–	2nd	–	–	1
India	–	–	4th	–	–	1
Japan	–	–	–	–	2nd	1
Netherlands	2nd	1st	1st	2nd	1st	5
New Zealand	–	–	–	3rd	–	1
South Africa	–	–	3rd	–	–	1
South Korea	–	2nd	–	–	–	1
Spain	–	–	–	–	3rd	1
Total	4	4	4	4	4	20

== All-time statistics ==
=== Goalscorers ===
==== Men ====
There were 160 goals scored in 36 matches, for an average of 4.44 goals per match.

6 goals

- (Australia) Grant Schubert
- (Germany) Björn Michel
- (Netherlands) Taeke Taekema

5 goals

- (Australia) Jamie Dwyer
- (Netherlands) Matthijs Brouwer
- (Pakistan) Rehan Butt

4 goals

- (Netherlands) Ronald Brouwer
- (Netherlands) Teun de Nooijer
- (Netherlands) Roderick Weusthof
- (Pakistan) Kashif Jawwad

3 goals

- (Australia) Travis Brooks
- (Germany) Christoph Bechmann
- (Germany) Matthias Witthaus
- (India) Deepak Thakur
- (India) Dilip Tirkey
- (Netherlands) Jeroen Hertzberger
- (Netherlands) Bram Lomans
- (Pakistan) Shakeel Abbasi
- (Pakistan) Sohail Abbas
- (South Korea) Seo Jong-ho
- (Spain) Santiago Freixa

2 goals

- (Australia) Benjamin Bishop
- (Australia) Luke Doerner
- (Australia) Michael McCann
- (Australia) Andrew Smith
- (England) Jonathan Clarke
- (England) Barry Middleton
- (England) Robert Moore
- (Germany) Florian Kunz
- (Germany) Thilo Stralkowski
- (Germany) Christopher Zeller
- (India) Gagan Ajit Singh
- (Netherlands) Floris Evers
- (Netherlands) Karel Klaver
- (Pakistan) Mudassar Ali Khan
- (Pakistan) Shabbir Hussain
- (Pakistan) Muhammad Saqlain
- (South Korea) Yoon Sung-hoon

1 goal

- (Australia) Robert Hammond
- (Australia) Matthew Naylor
- (Australia) Matthew Wells
- (Australia) Liam de Young
- (England) Richard Alexander
- (England) Alastair Brogdon
- (England) Benjamin Hawes
- (England) Iain Mackay
- (England) Richard Smith
- (England) James Tindall
- (Germany) Björn Emmerling
- (Germany) Moritz Fürste
- (Germany) Oliver Korn
- (Germany) Niklas Meinert
- (Germany) Jan-Marco Montag
- (Germany) Nico Sonnenschein
- (India) Dhanraj Pillay
- (India) Baljeet Singh
- (India) Didar Singh
- (India) Kanwalpreet Singh
- (Netherlands) Quirjin Caspers
- (Netherlands) Marten Eikelboom
- (Netherlands) Piet-Hein Geeris
- (Netherlands) Rogier Hofman
- (Pakistan) Ghazanfar Ali
- (Pakistan) Dilawar Hussain
- (Pakistan) Muhammad Imran
- (Pakistan) Muhammad Nadeem
- (Pakistan) Imran Warsi
- (Pakistan) Adnan Zakir
- (Pakistan) Muhammad Zubair
- (South Korea) Hong Eun-seong
- (South Korea) Lee Jeong-seon
- (South Korea) Jang Jong-hyun
- (South Korea) Hwang Jong-hyun
- (South Korea) Kim Jung-chul
- (South Korea) Kang Seong-jung
- (South Korea) Ji Seung-hwan
- (South Korea) Lee Sung-min
- (South Korea) Yeo Woon-kon
- (Spain) Pol Amat
- (Spain) Albert Sala
- (Spain) Víctor Sojo
- (Spain) Eduardo Tubau

==== Women ====
There were 189 goals scored in 44 matches, for an average of 4.3 goals per match.

10 goals

- (Netherlands) Maartje Paumen

8 goals

- (Netherlands) Mijntje Donners

5 goals

- (Netherlands) Frédérique Matla

4 goals

- (Netherlands) Maartje Goderie
- (Netherlands) Lidewij Welten

3 goals

- (Argentina) Inés Arrondo
- (Argentina) Noel Barrionuevo
- (Argentina) Alejandra Gulla
- (Australia) Julie Towers
- (China) Zhao Yudiao
- (Netherlands) Marion Agliotti
- (Netherlands) Wieke Dijkstra
- (Netherlands) Eva de Goede
- (Netherlands) Kelly Jonker
- (Netherlands) Kim Lammers
- (Netherlands) Caia van Maasakker
- (Netherlands) Fatima Moreira de Melo
- (South Africa) Vida Ryan
- (South Africa) Kathleen Taylor
- (South Korea) Lee Mi-seong

2 goals

- (Argentina) Luciana Aymar
- (Argentina) Soledad García
- (Argentina) Delfina Merino
- (Argentina) Carla Rebecchi
- (China) Fu Baorong
- (China) Zhang Jinrong
- (China) Gao Lihua
- (China) Liu Meng
- (China) Song Qingling
- (China) Chen Zhaoxia
- (China) Ma Yibo
- (Germany) Nadine Ernsting-Krienke
- (Germany) Alexandra Kollmar
- (United Kingdom) Lucilla Wright
- (India) Rani Devi
- (Japan) Hazuki Nagai
- (Japan) Yuri Nagai
- (Japan) Akiko Kato
- (Netherlands) Naomi van As
- (Netherlands) Ageeth Boomgaardt
- (Netherlands) Janneke Schopman
- (New Zealand) Clarissa Eshuis
- (New Zealand) Krystal Forgesson
- (South Korea) Kim Yun-mi
- (Spain) Lola Riera

1 goal

- (Argentina) Natalí Doreski
- (Argentina) María Paz Ferrari
- (Argentina) Marina di Giacomo
- (Argentina) Cecilia Rognoni
- (Australia) Peta Gallagher
- (Australia) Bianca Netzler
- (Australia) Megan Rivers
- (Australia) Angela Skirving
- (Australia) Karen Smith
- (China) Tang Chunling
- (China) Zhong Jiaqi
- (China) Zhang Lang
- (China) Chen Qunqing
- (China) Zhou Wanfeng
- (China) Dan Wen
- (China) Xi Xiayun
- (China) Zhang Xindan
- (Germany) Anneke Böhmert
- (Germany) Caroline Casaretto
- (Germany) Denise Klecker
- (Germany) Anke Kühn
- (Germany) Fanny Rinne
- (Germany) Marion Rodewald
- (United Kingdom) Crista Cullen
- (United Kingdom) Alexandra Danson
- (United Kingdom) Helen Richardson
- (United Kingdom) Chloe Rogers
- (United Kingdom) Rachel Walker
- (India) Surinder Kaur
- (Japan) Motomi Kawamura
- (Japan) Kana Nomura
- (Japan) Aki Yamada
- (Netherlands) Carlien Dirkse van den Heuvel
- (Netherlands) Saskia Fuchs
- (Netherlands) Marianne van Geenhuizen
- (Netherlands) Margot van Geffen
- (Netherlands) Ellen Hoog
- (Netherlands) Sylvia Karres
- (Netherlands) Laurien Leurink
- (Netherlands) Kitty van Male
- (Netherlands) Eefke Mulder
- (Netherlands) Maartje Scheepstra
- (Netherlands) Jiske Snoeks
- (Netherlands) Maria Verschoor
- (Netherlands) Margot Zuidhof
- (New Zealand) Gemma Flynn
- (New Zealand) Katie Glynn
- (New Zealand) Charlotte Harrison
- (New Zealand) Stacey Michelsen
- (South Africa) Marsha Marescia
- (South Africa) Jennifer Wilson
- (South Korea) Nam Jin-a
- (South Korea) Lee Jin-hee
- (South Korea) Kim Jin-kyoung
- (South Korea) Ko Kwang-min
- (South Korea) Park Mi-hyun
- (South Korea) Lee Seon-ok
- (Spain) Carmen Cano
- (Spain) María López
- (Spain) Alicia Magaz
- (Spain) Beatriz Pérez
- (Spain) Carola Salvatella
- (Spain) Marta Segú
