= List of international goals scored by Sohail Abbas =

Sohail Abbas is a former professional field hockey player who has represented Pakistan national field hockey team since his debut on 28 February 1998 against India in a bilateral Test match. He scored his first international goal in the second match of the series off a penalty corner with the goal being the winner in the 2–1 win. He is the current all–time top goalscorer for Pakistan and in international men's field hockey with 348 goals in 311 appearances in post–war era.

On 10 December 1998, Abbas scored his first international hat–trick against Hong Kong at the 1998 Asian Games. He has scored 23 international hat–tricks a world record and on one occasion he scored seven goals in a single match which puts him among the only six Pakistani players to have scored a double hat–trick in international matches. He finished the calendar year 1999 with 60 goals breaking the 58 goals world record of Paul Litjens of Netherlands. On 18 September 2000 Abbas became the quickest to complete 100 international goals when he scored a hat–trick against the Great Britain at the 2000 Sydney Olympics. He did so in a record period of two years, six months and 18 days in 83 appearances.

On 24 January 2002 Abbas scored a goal in the 2–2 draw against Australia in a six nations invitational tournament in Kuala Lumpur taking his tally to 151 goals, thus becoming his country's all–time top scorer, surpassing the record of 150 goals set by Hassan Sardar. He scored twice in a thrilling 5–6 win against Argentina on 17 August at the 2003 Hockey Champions Trophy completing his 200 international goals becoming the first and as of now the only Pakistani player to do so. On 8 October 2004 Abbas scored his 268th international goal against India at Amritsar in a bilateral test series match becoming the highest goalscorer in international hockey surpassing Paul Litjens's 267 goals for Netherlands, a record which he currently holds. Abbas has participated in the two most prestigious tournaments in international field hockey seven times: FIH Hockey World Cups in 1998, 2002 2006 and 2010 and three Olympics in 2000, 2004 and 2012, scoring in all of them while being the top scorer at the 2002 World Cup and 2004 Olympics with 10 and 11 goals respectively. He has also appeared in the former Hockey Champions Trophy organized by FIH eight times from 1998 to 2011 being the top scorer for Pakistan in the competition with 41 goals. He has scored 54 goals against India, most goals against a single opponent. He has scored 74 international goals at the Malaysia National Hockey Stadium in Kuala Lumpur, his most at a single venue.

== Goals ==
As of last match played on 9 August 2012

No	Cap	Date	Opponent	Result	Venue	Competition	Ref
1	2	1 March 1998	India	2–1	Army Hockey Stadium, Rawalpindi, Pakistan	Test match	
2	3	5 March 1998	India	3–4	National Hockey Stadium, Lahore, Pakistan	Test match	
3	3	5 March 1998	India	3–4	National Hockey Stadium, Lahore, Pakistan	Test match	
4	11	16 May 1998	Belgium	3–6	KHC Dragons Stadium, Antwerp, Belgium	Test match	
5	11	16 May 1998	Belgium	3–6	KHC Dragons Stadium, Antwerp, Belgium	Test match	
6	13	21 May 1998	Malaysia	2–7	Stadion Galgenwaard, Utrecht, Netherlands	1998 FIH Hockey World Cup	
7	15	25 May 1998	Spain	1–2	Stadion Galgenwaard, Utrecht, Netherlands	1998 FIH Hockey World Cup	
8	21	1 November 1998	Spain	2–2	National Hockey Stadium, Lahore, Pakistan	1998 Hockey Champions Trophy	
9	22	3 November 1998	Australia	4–4	National Hockey Stadium, Lahore, Pakistan	1998 Hockey Champions Trophy	
10	23	4 November 1998	Netherlands	5–3	National Hockey Stadium, Lahore, Pakistan	1998 Hockey Champions Trophy	
11	24	6 November 1998	Germany	3–1	National Hockey Stadium, Lahore, Pakistan	1998 Hockey Champions Trophy	
12	26	8 December 1998	Thailand	8–0	Queen Siritkit Sport Complex, Bangkok, Thailand	1998 Asian Games	
13	27	10 December 1998	Hong Kong	5–0	Queen Siritkit Sport Complex, Bangkok, Thailand	1998 Asian Games	
14	27	10 December 1998	Hong Kong	5–0	Queen Siritkit Sport Complex, Bangkok, Thailand	1998 Asian Games	
15	27	10 December 1998	Hong Kong	5–0	Queen Siritkit Sport Complex, Bangkok, Thailand	1998 Asian Games	
16	29	14 December 1998	Japan	1–1	Queen Siritkit Sport Complex, Bangkok, Thailand	1998 Asian Games	
17	30	17 December 1998	South Korea	3–2	Queen Siritkit Sport Complex, Bangkok, Thailand	1998 Asian Games	
18	30	17 December 1998	South Korea	3–2	Queen Siritkit Sport Complex, Bangkok, Thailand	1998 Asian Games	
19	31	19 December 1998	Japan	3–0	Queen Siritkit Sport Complex, Bangkok, Thailand	1998 Asian Games	
20	31	19 December 1998	Japan	3–0	Queen Siritkit Sport Complex, Bangkok, Thailand	1998 Asian Games	
21	32	3 February 1999	India	3–4	Major Dhyan Chand National Stadium, New Delhi, India	Test match	
22	32	3 February 1999	India	3–4	Major Dhyan Chand National Stadium, New Delhi, India	Test match	
23	33	5 February 1999	India	1–4	Aishbagh Stadium, Bhopal, India	Test match	
24	33	5 February 1999	India	1–4	Aishbagh Stadium, Bhopal, India	Test match	
25	34	8 February 1999	India	2–5	Begumpeth Hockey Stadium, Hyderabad, India	Test match	
26	36	16 February 1999	India	4–2	National Hockey Stadium, Lahore, Pakistan	Test match	
27	36	16 February 1999	India	4–2	National Hockey Stadium, Lahore, Pakistan	Test match	
28	38	20 February 1999	India	1–2	Lala Ayub Stadium, Peshawar, Pakistan	Test match	
29	39	22 February 1999	India	3–3	Army Hockey Stadium, Rawalpindi, Pakistan	Test match	
30	40	24 February 1999	India	2–3	National Hockey Stadium, Lahore, Pakistan	Test match	
31	41	2 April 1999	Canada	6–3	Malaysia National Hockey Stadium, Kuala Lumpur, Malaysia	1999 Sultan Azlan Shah Cup	
32	41	2 April 1999	Canada	6–3	Malaysia National Hockey Stadium, Kuala Lumpur, Malaysia	1999 Sultan Azlan Shah Cup	
33	42	4 April 1999	South Korea	2–6	Malaysia National Hockey Stadium, Kuala Lumpur, Malaysia	1999 Sultan Azlan Shah Cup	
34	42	4 April 1999	South Korea	2–6	Malaysia National Hockey Stadium, Kuala Lumpur, Malaysia	1999 Sultan Azlan Shah Cup	
35	43	5 April 1999	New Zealand	5–2	Malaysia National Hockey Stadium, Kuala Lumpur, Malaysia	1999 Sultan Azlan Shah Cup	
36	43	5 April 1999	New Zealand	5–2	Malaysia National Hockey Stadium, Kuala Lumpur, Malaysia	1999 Sultan Azlan Shah Cup	
37	43	5 April 1999	New Zealand	5–2	Malaysia National Hockey Stadium, Kuala Lumpur, Malaysia	1999 Sultan Azlan Shah Cup	
38	44	7 April 1999	Malaysia	1–5	Malaysia National Hockey Stadium, Kuala Lumpur, Malaysia	1999 Sultan Azlan Shah Cup	
39	44	7 April 1999	Malaysia	1–5	Malaysia National Hockey Stadium, Kuala Lumpur, Malaysia	1999 Sultan Azlan Shah Cup	
40	45	8 April 1999	Germany	4–2	Malaysia National Hockey Stadium, Kuala Lumpur, Malaysia	1999 Sultan Azlan Shah Cup	
41	45	8 April 1999	Germany	4–2	Malaysia National Hockey Stadium, Kuala Lumpur, Malaysia	1999 Sultan Azlan Shah Cup	
42	46	10 April 1999	South Korea	3–1	Malaysia National Hockey Stadium, Kuala Lumpur, Malaysia	1999 Sultan Azlan Shah Cup	
43	49	13 June 1999	South Korea	2–2	Queensland State Hockey Centre, Brisbane, Australia	1999 Hockey Champions Trophy	
44	51	18 June 1999	Australia	2–1	Queensland State Hockey Centre, Brisbane, Australia	1999 Hockey Champions Trophy	
45	52	20 June 1999	England	4–3	Queensland State Hockey Centre, Brisbane, Australia	1999 Hockey Champions Trophy	
46	52	20 June 1999	England	4–3	Queensland State Hockey Centre, Brisbane, Australia	1999 Hockey Champions Trophy	
47	53	11 August 1999	Germany	4–4	Wagener Stadium, Amstelveen, Netherlands	Four Nations Tournament	
48	53	11 August 1999	Germany	4–4	Wagener Stadium, Amstelveen, Netherlands	Four Nations Tournament	
49	54	12 August 1999	Spain	3–6	Wagener Stadium, Amstelveen, Netherlands	Four Nations Tournament	
50	54	12 August 1999	Spain	3–6	Wagener Stadium, Amstelveen, Netherlands	Four Nations Tournament	
51	55	14 August 1999	Netherlands	4–6	Wagener Stadium, Amstelveen, Netherlands	Four Nations Tournament	
52	55	14 August 1999	Netherlands	4–6	Wagener Stadium, Amstelveen, Netherlands	Four Nations Tournament	
53	56	15 August 1999	Netherlands	4–2	Wagener Stadium, Amstelveen, Netherlands	Four Nations Tournament	
54	56	15 August 1999	Netherlands	4–2	Wagener Stadium, Amstelveen, Netherlands	Four Nations Tournament	
55	57	17 August 1999	Switzerland	3–6	Cornaredo Stadium, Lugano, Switzerland	Test match	
56	57	17 August 1999	Switzerland	3–6	Cornaredo Stadium, Lugano, Switzerland	Test match	
57	57	17 August 1999	Switzerland	3–6	Cornaredo Stadium, Lugano, Switzerland	Test match	
58	59	20 August 1999	France	8–2	Hockey Club Rotweiss Wettingen, Wettingen, Switzerland	Tri Nation Series	
59	59	20 August 1999	France	8–2	Hockey Club Rotweiss Wettingen, Wettingen, Switzerland	Tri Nation Series	
60	60	21 August 1999	Switzerland	4–8	Hockey Club Rotweiss Wettingen, Wettingen, Switzerland	Tri Nation Series	
61	60	21 August 1999	Switzerland	4–8	Hockey Club Rotweiss Wettingen, Wettingen, Switzerland	Tri Nation Series	
62	60	21 August 1999	Switzerland	4–8	Hockey Club Rotweiss Wettingen, Wettingen, Switzerland	Tri Nation Series	
63	60	21 August 1999	Switzerland	4–8	Hockey Club Rotweiss Wettingen, Wettingen, Switzerland	Tri Nation Series	
64	60	21 August 1999	Switzerland	4–8	Hockey Club Rotweiss Wettingen, Wettingen, Switzerland	Tri Nation Series	
65	62	19 November 1999	Sri Lanka	15–0	Malaysia National Hockey Stadium, Kuala Lumpur, Malaysia	1999 Hockey Asia Cup	
66	62	19 November 1999	Sri Lanka	15–0	Malaysia National Hockey Stadium, Kuala Lumpur, Malaysia	1999 Hockey Asia Cup	
67	62	19 November 1999	Sri Lanka	15–0	Malaysia National Hockey Stadium, Kuala Lumpur, Malaysia	1999 Hockey Asia Cup	
68	62	19 November 1999	Sri Lanka	15–0	Malaysia National Hockey Stadium, Kuala Lumpur, Malaysia	1999 Hockey Asia Cup	
69	62	19 November 1999	Sri Lanka	15–0	Malaysia National Hockey Stadium, Kuala Lumpur, Malaysia	1999 Hockey Asia Cup	
70	62	19 November 1999	Sri Lanka	15–0	Malaysia National Hockey Stadium, Kuala Lumpur, Malaysia	1999 Hockey Asia Cup	
71	62	19 November 1999	Sri Lanka	15–0	Malaysia National Hockey Stadium, Kuala Lumpur, Malaysia	1999 Hockey Asia Cup	
72	63	21 November 1999	China	10–1	Malaysia National Hockey Stadium, Kuala Lumpur, Malaysia	1999 Hockey Asia Cup	
73	63	21 November 1999	China	10–1	Malaysia National Hockey Stadium, Kuala Lumpur, Malaysia	1999 Hockey Asia Cup	
74	63	21 November 1999	China	10–1	Malaysia National Hockey Stadium, Kuala Lumpur, Malaysia	1999 Hockey Asia Cup	
75	63	21 November 1999	China	10–1	Malaysia National Hockey Stadium, Kuala Lumpur, Malaysia	1999 Hockey Asia Cup	
76	64	23 November 1999	Bangladesh	6–0	Malaysia National Hockey Stadium, Kuala Lumpur, Malaysia	1999 Hockey Asia Cup	
77	64	23 November 1999	Bangladesh	6–0	Malaysia National Hockey Stadium, Kuala Lumpur, Malaysia	1999 Hockey Asia Cup	
78	64	23 November 1999	Bangladesh	6–0	Malaysia National Hockey Stadium, Kuala Lumpur, Malaysia	1999 Hockey Asia Cup	
79	65	24 November 1999	South Korea	1–0	Malaysia National Hockey Stadium, Kuala Lumpur, Malaysia	1999 Hockey Asia Cup	
80	66	26 November 1999	Malaysia	3–2	Malaysia National Hockey Stadium, Kuala Lumpur, Malaysia	1999 Hockey Asia Cup	
81	68	10 March 2000	Switzerland	7–3	Nagai Sports Ground, Osaka, Japan	2000 Olympic Qualifiers	
82	68	10 March 2000	Switzerland	7–3	Nagai Sports Ground, Osaka, Japan	2000 Olympic Qualifiers	
83	69	11 March 2000	Spain	4–4	Nagai Sports Ground, Osaka, Japan	2000 Olympic Qualifiers	
84	69	11 March 2000	Spain	4–4	Nagai Sports Ground, Osaka, Japan	2000 Olympic Qualifiers	
85	69	11 March 2000	Spain	4–4	Nagai Sports Ground, Osaka, Japan	2000 Olympic Qualifiers	
86	69	11 March 2000	Spain	4–4	Nagai Sports Ground, Osaka, Japan	2000 Olympic Qualifiers	
87	70	13 March 2000	Belarus	6–0	Nagai Sports Ground, Osaka, Japan	2000 Olympic Qualifiers	
88	70	13 March 2000	Belarus	6–0	Nagai Sports Ground, Osaka, Japan	2000 Olympic Qualifiers	
89	70	13 March 2000	Belarus	6–0	Nagai Sports Ground, Osaka, Japan	2000 Olympic Qualifiers	
90	72	16 March 2000	Argentina	3–4	Nagai Sports Ground, Osaka, Japan	2000 Olympic Qualifiers	
91	73	18 March 2000	South Korea	1–3	Nagai Sports Ground, Osaka, Japan	2000 Olympic Qualifiers	
92	74	20 March 2000	Spain	2–3	Nagai Sports Ground, Osaka, Japan	2000 Olympic Qualifiers	
93	74	20 March 2000	Spain	2–3	Nagai Sports Ground, Osaka, Japan	2000 Olympic Qualifiers	
94	75	8 August 2000	Australia	4–2	Commonwealth Hockey Stadium, Perth, Australia	Test match	
95	75	8 August 2000	Australia	4–2	Commonwealth Hockey Stadium, Perth, Australia	Test match	
96	76	11 August 2000	Australia	1–2	Commonwealth Hockey Stadium, Perth, Australia	Test match	
97	79	31 August 2000	New Zealand	0–1	North Harbour Hockey Stadium, Albany, New Zealand	Test match	
98	81	3 September 2000	New Zealand	1–5	Lloyd Elsmore Hockey Stadium, Auckland, New Zealand	Test match	
99	82	16 September 2000	Canada	2–2	Sydney Olympic Park Hockey Center, Sydney, Australia	2000 Summer Olympics	
100	83	18 September 2000	Great Britain	1–8	Sydney Olympic Park Hockey Center, Sydney, Australia	2000 Summer Olympics	
101	83	18 September 2000	Great Britain	1–8	Sydney Olympic Park Hockey Center, Sydney, Australia	2000 Summer Olympics	
102	83	18 September 2000	Great Britain	1–8	Sydney Olympic Park Hockey Center, Sydney, Australia	2000 Summer Olympics	
103	84	21 September 2000	Germany	1–1	Sydney Olympic Park Hockey Center, Sydney, Australia	2000 Summer Olympics	
104	85	23 September 2000	Malaysia	2–2	Sydney Olympic Park Hockey Center, Sydney, Australia	2000 Summer Olympics	
105	86	26 September 2000	Netherlands	0–2	Sydney Olympic Park Hockey Center, Sydney, Australia	2000 Summer Olympics	
106	88	30 September 2000	Australia	3–6	Sydney Olympic Park Hockey Center, Sydney, Australia	2000 Summer Olympics	
107	89	11 March 2001	China	3–1	Maulana Bhasani Hockey Stadium, Dhaka, Bangladesh	Gold Cup Tournament Dhaka	
108	89	11 March 2001	China	3–1	Maulana Bhasani Hockey Stadium, Dhaka, Bangladesh	Gold Cup Tournament Dhaka	
109	91	15 March 2001	Ireland	1–6	Maulana Bhasani Hockey Stadium, Dhaka, Bangladesh	Gold Cup Tournament Dhaka	
110	91	15 March 2001	Ireland	1–6	Maulana Bhasani Hockey Stadium, Dhaka, Bangladesh	Gold Cup Tournament Dhaka	
111	93	18 March 2001	Japan	5–3	Maulana Bhasani Hockey Stadium, Dhaka, Bangladesh	Gold Cup Tournament Dhaka	
112	93	18 March 2001	Japan	5–3	Maulana Bhasani Hockey Stadium, Dhaka, Bangladesh	Gold Cup Tournament Dhaka	
113	93	18 March 2001	Japan	5–3	Maulana Bhasani Hockey Stadium, Dhaka, Bangladesh	Gold Cup Tournament Dhaka	
114	95	15 June 2001	Spain	2–6	Estadi de Hockey Josep Marquès, Terrassa, Spain	Test match	
115	95	15 June 2001	Spain	2–6	Estadi de Hockey Josep Marquès, Terrassa, Spain	Test match	
116	96	17 June 2001	Spain	3–3	Real Club de Polo de Barcelona, Barcelona, Spain	Test match	
117	97	20 June 2001	Germany	4–2	MSV Duisburg 02 Hockey, Duisburg, Germany	Test match	
118	98	22 June 2001	Netherlands	1–1	UHC Clubanlage, Hamburg, Germany	2001 Hamburg Masters	
119	99	23 June 2001	Germany	3–2	UHC Clubanlage, Hamburg, Germany	2001 Hamburg Masters	
120	100	24 June 2001	South Korea	8–6	UHC Clubanlage, Hamburg, Germany	2001 Hamburg Masters	
121	100	24 June 2001	South Korea	8–6	UHC Clubanlage, Hamburg, Germany	2001 Hamburg Masters	
122	100	24 June 2001	South Korea	8–6	UHC Clubanlage, Hamburg, Germany	2001 Hamburg Masters	
123	101	26 June 2001	Belgium	2–1	KHC Dragons Stadium, Antwerp, Belgium	Test match	
124	103	30 June 2001	Netherlands	0–3	De Klapperboom, Utrecht, Netherlands	Test match	
125	104	1 July 2001	Netherlands	2–2	De Roggewoning, The Hague, Netherlands	Test match	
126	105	2 August 2001	Australia	5–3	Malaysia National Hockey Stadium, Kuala Lumpur, Malaysia	2001 Sultan Azlan Shah Cup	
127	106	3 August 2001	South Korea	2–2	Malaysia National Hockey Stadium, Kuala Lumpur, Malaysia	2001 Sultan Azlan Shah Cup	
128	107	5 August 2001	India	4–3	Malaysia National Hockey Stadium, Kuala Lumpur, Malaysia	2001 Sultan Azlan Shah Cup	
129	108	6 August 2001	England	3–4	Malaysia National Hockey Stadium, Kuala Lumpur, Malaysia	2001 Sultan Azlan Shah Cup	
130	108	6 August 2001	England	3–4	Malaysia National Hockey Stadium, Kuala Lumpur, Malaysia	2001 Sultan Azlan Shah Cup	
131	109	8 August 2001	Malaysia	3–4	Malaysia National Hockey Stadium, Kuala Lumpur, Malaysia	2001 Sultan Azlan Shah Cup	
132	109	8 August 2001	Malaysia	3–4	Malaysia National Hockey Stadium, Kuala Lumpur, Malaysia	2001 Sultan Azlan Shah Cup	
133	109	8 August 2001	Malaysia	3–4	Malaysia National Hockey Stadium, Kuala Lumpur, Malaysia	2001 Sultan Azlan Shah Cup	
134	110	9 August 2001	Germany	3–5	Malaysia National Hockey Stadium, Kuala Lumpur, Malaysia	2001 Sultan Azlan Shah Cup	
135	111	12 August 2001	Australia	4–3	Malaysia National Hockey Stadium, Kuala Lumpur, Malaysia	2001 Sultan Azlan Shah Cup	
136	112	3 November 2001	Netherlands	1–1	Hazelaarweg Stadion, Rotterdam, Netherlands	2001 Hockey Champions Trophy	
137	114	6 November 2001	Australia	3–1	Hazelaarweg Stadion, Rotterdam, Netherlands	2001 Hockey Champions Trophy	
138	115	7 November 2001	Germany	4–5	Hazelaarweg Stadion, Rotterdam, Netherlands	2001 Hockey Champions Trophy	
139	115	7 November 2001	Germany	4–5	Hazelaarweg Stadion, Rotterdam, Netherlands	2001 Hockey Champions Trophy	
140	115	7 November 2001	Germany	4–5	Hazelaarweg Stadion, Rotterdam, Netherlands	2001 Hockey Champions Trophy	
141	116	10 November 2001	England	3–6	Hazelaarweg Stadion, Rotterdam, Netherlands	2001 Hockey Champions Trophy	
142	116	10 November 2001	England	3–6	Hazelaarweg Stadion, Rotterdam, Netherlands	2001 Hockey Champions Trophy	
143	117	11 November 2001	Netherlands	2–5	Hazelaarweg Stadion, Rotterdam, Netherlands	2001 Hockey Champions Trophy	
144	118	16 January 2002	Malaysia	3–3	Malaysia National Hockey Stadium, Kuala Lumpur, Malaysia	Test match	
145	118	16 January 2002	Malaysia	3–3	Malaysia National Hockey Stadium, Kuala Lumpur, Malaysia	Test match	
146	119	18 January 2002	Netherlands	3–0	Malaysia National Hockey Stadium, Kuala Lumpur, Malaysia	Six Nations Kuala Lumpur	
147	120	20 January 2002	Malaysia	1–4	Malaysia National Hockey Stadium, Kuala Lumpur, Malaysia	Six Nations Kuala Lumpur	
148	121	21 January 2002	Malaysia	9–1	Malaysia National Hockey Stadium, Kuala Lumpur, Malaysia	Six Nations Kuala Lumpur	
149	121	21 January 2002	Malaysia	9–1	Malaysia National Hockey Stadium, Kuala Lumpur, Malaysia	Six Nations Kuala Lumpur	
150	122	23 January 2002	New Zealand	3–1	Malaysia National Hockey Stadium, Kuala Lumpur, Malaysia	Six Nations Kuala Lumpur	
151	123	24 January 2002	Australia	2–2	Malaysia National Hockey Stadium, Kuala Lumpur, Malaysia	Six Nations Kuala Lumpur	
152	124	26 January 2002	Australia	4–3	Malaysia National Hockey Stadium, Kuala Lumpur, Malaysia	Six Nations Kuala Lumpur	
153	125	24 February 2002	South Africa	5–0	Malaysia National Hockey Stadium, Kuala Lumpur, Malaysia	2002 FIH Hockey World Cup	
154	125	24 February 2002	South Africa	5–0	Malaysia National Hockey Stadium, Kuala Lumpur, Malaysia	2002 FIH Hockey World Cup	
155	126	25 February 2002	Belgium	3–2	Malaysia National Hockey Stadium, Kuala Lumpur, Malaysia	2002 FIH Hockey World Cup	
156	126	25 February 2002	Belgium	3–2	Malaysia National Hockey Stadium, Kuala Lumpur, Malaysia	2002 FIH Hockey World Cup	
157	128	28 February 2002	Argentina	2–1	Malaysia National Hockey Stadium, Kuala Lumpur, Malaysia	2002 FIH Hockey World Cup	
158	131	5 March 2002	Germany	2–3	Malaysia National Hockey Stadium, Kuala Lumpur, Malaysia	2002 FIH Hockey World Cup	
159	131	5 March 2002	Germany	2–3	Malaysia National Hockey Stadium, Kuala Lumpur, Malaysia	2002 FIH Hockey World Cup	
160	132	7 March 2002	Malaysia	1–2	Malaysia National Hockey Stadium, Kuala Lumpur, Malaysia	2002 FIH Hockey World Cup	
161	133	8 March 2002	Argentina	3–5	Malaysia National Hockey Stadium, Kuala Lumpur, Malaysia	2002 FIH Hockey World Cup	
162	133	8 March 2002	Argentina	3–5	Malaysia National Hockey Stadium, Kuala Lumpur, Malaysia	2002 FIH Hockey World Cup	
163	135	16 July 2002	Spain	2–4	Campo de Hockey Bidebieta, San Sebastian, Spain	Test match	
164	135	16 July 2002	Spain	2–4	Campo de Hockey Bidebieta, San Sebastian, Spain	Test match	
165	136	18 July 2002	Spain	2–3	Complejo De Deportes La Alberica, Santander, Spain	Test match	
166	136	18 July 2002	Spain	2–3	Complejo De Deportes La Alberica, Santander, Spain	Test match	
167	137	20 July 2002	Spain	3–5	Club de Campo, Madrid, Spain	Test match	
168	137	20 July 2002	Spain	3–5	Club de Campo, Madrid, Spain	Test match	
169	138	27 July 2002	England	0–3	Belle Vue Hockey Centre, Manchester, England	2002 Commonwealth Games	
170	138	27 July 2002	England	0–3	Belle Vue Hockey Centre, Manchester, England	2002 Commonwealth Games	
171	138	27 July 2002	England	0–3	Belle Vue Hockey Centre, Manchester, England	2002 Commonwealth Games	
172	140	30 July 2002	Canada	2–0	Belle Vue Hockey Centre, Manchester, England	2002 Commonwealth Games	
173	142	4 August 2002	South Africa	10–2	Belle Vue Hockey Centre, Manchester, England	2002 Commonwealth Games	
174	142	4 August 2002	South Africa	10–2	Belle Vue Hockey Centre, Manchester, England	2002 Commonwealth Games	
175	142	4 August 2002	South Africa	10–2	Belle Vue Hockey Centre, Manchester, England	2002 Commonwealth Games	
176	142	4 August 2002	South Africa	10–2	Belle Vue Hockey Centre, Manchester, England	2002 Commonwealth Games	
177	142	4 August 2002	South Africa	10–2	Belle Vue Hockey Centre, Manchester, England	2002 Commonwealth Games	
178	144	1 September 2002	South Korea	1–4	Kölner Stadtwald, Cologne, Germany	2002 Hockey Champions Trophy	
179	146	4 September 2002	India	3–2	Kölner Stadtwald, Cologne, Germany	2002 Hockey Champions Trophy	
180	147	6 September 2002	Australia	2–0	Kölner Stadtwald, Cologne, Germany	2002 Hockey Champions Trophy	
181	149	30 September 2002	China	8–3	Gangseo Hockey Stadium, Busan, South Korea	2002 Asian Games	
182	149	30 September 2002	China	8–3	Gangseo Hockey Stadium, Busan, South Korea	2002 Asian Games	
183	150	4 October 2002	Bangladesh	0–9	Gangseo Hockey Stadium, Busan, South Korea	2002 Asian Games	
184	150	4 October 2002	Bangladesh	0–9	Gangseo Hockey Stadium, Busan, South Korea	2002 Asian Games	
185	152	10 October 2002	India	3–4	Gangseo Hockey Stadium, Busan, South Korea	2002 Asian Games	
186	152	10 October 2002	India	3–4	Gangseo Hockey Stadium, Busan, South Korea	2002 Asian Games	
187	153	12 October 2002	Malaysia	1p–1	Gangseo Hockey Stadium, Busan, South Korea	2002 Asian Games	
188	154	17 March 2003	Malaysia	3–5	Azlan Shah Stadium, Ipoh, Malaysia	Test match	
189	154	17 March 2003	Malaysia	3–5	Azlan Shah Stadium, Ipoh, Malaysia	Test match	
190	155	18 March 2003	Malaysia	1–4	Azlan Shah Stadium, Ipoh, Malaysia	Test match	
191	155	18 March 2003	Malaysia	1–4	Azlan Shah Stadium, Ipoh, Malaysia	Test match	
192	157	22 March 2003	New Zealand	6–1	Azlan Shah Stadium, Ipoh, Malaysia	2003 Sultan Azlan Shah Cup	
193	158	23 March 2003	Germany	4–3	Azlan Shah Stadium, Ipoh, Malaysia	2003 Sultan Azlan Shah Cup	
194	159	26 March 2003	Malaysia	3–1	Azlan Shah Stadium, Ipoh, Malaysia	2003 Sultan Azlan Shah Cup	
195	159	26 March 2003	Malaysia	3–1	Azlan Shah Stadium, Ipoh, Malaysia	2003 Sultan Azlan Shah Cup	
196	160	28 March 2003	South Korea	0–1	Azlan Shah Stadium, Ipoh, Malaysia	2003 Sultan Azlan Shah Cup	
197	162	13 August 2003	Netherlands	5–2	Wagener Stadium, Amstelveen, Netherlands	Test match	
198	163	16 August 2003	Australia	4–4	Wagener Stadium, Amstelveen, Netherlands	2003 Hockey Champions Trophy	
199	163	16 August 2003	Australia	4–4	Wagener Stadium, Amstelveen, Netherlands	2003 Hockey Champions Trophy	
200	164	17 August 2003	Argentina	5–6	Wagener Stadium, Amstelveen, Netherlands	2003 Hockey Champions Trophy	
201	164	17 August 2003	Argentina	5–6	Wagener Stadium, Amstelveen, Netherlands	2003 Hockey Champions Trophy	
202	165	19 August 2003	Netherlands	2–2	Wagener Stadium, Amstelveen, Netherlands	2003 Hockey Champions Trophy	
203	166	21 August 2003	Germany	5–2	Wagener Stadium, Amstelveen, Netherlands	2003 Hockey Champions Trophy	
204	167	22 August 2003	India	7–4	Wagener Stadium, Amstelveen, Netherlands	2003 Hockey Champions Trophy	
205	168	24 August 2003	India	4–3	Wagener Stadium, Amstelveen, Netherlands	2003 Hockey Champions Trophy	
206	168	24 August 2003	India	4–3	Wagener Stadium, Amstelveen, Netherlands	2003 Hockey Champions Trophy	
207	169	21 September 2003	Bangladesh	8–0	Malaysia National Hockey Stadium, Kuala Lumpur, Malaysia	2003 Hockey Asia Cup	
208	169	21 September 2003	Bangladesh	8–0	Malaysia National Hockey Stadium, Kuala Lumpur, Malaysia	2003 Hockey Asia Cup	
209	170	22 September 2003	China	7–1	Malaysia National Hockey Stadium, Kuala Lumpur, Malaysia	2003 Hockey Asia Cup	
210	170	22 September 2003	China	7–1	Malaysia National Hockey Stadium, Kuala Lumpur, Malaysia	2003 Hockey Asia Cup	
211	171	24 September 2003	India	4–2	Malaysia National Hockey Stadium, Kuala Lumpur, Malaysia	2003 Hockey Asia Cup	
212	173	28 September 2003	India	4–2	Malaysia National Hockey Stadium, Kuala Lumpur, Malaysia	2003 Hockey Asia Cup	
213	173	28 September 2003	India	4–2	Malaysia National Hockey Stadium, Kuala Lumpur, Malaysia	2003 Hockey Asia Cup	
214	174	14 December 2003	Malaysia	4–1	Hockey Club of Pakistan, Karachi, Pakistan	Test match	
215	174	14 December 2003	Malaysia	4–1	Hockey Club of Pakistan, Karachi, Pakistan	Test match	
216	176	9 January 2004	India	3–2	Malaysia National Hockey Stadium, Kuala Lumpur, Malaysia	2004 Sultan Azlan Shah Cup	
217	176	9 January 2004	India	3–2	Malaysia National Hockey Stadium, Kuala Lumpur, Malaysia	2004 Sultan Azlan Shah Cup	
218	176	9 January 2004	India	3–2	Malaysia National Hockey Stadium, Kuala Lumpur, Malaysia	2004 Sultan Azlan Shah Cup	
219	178	12 January 2004	Germany	3–4	Malaysia National Hockey Stadium, Kuala Lumpur, Malaysia	2004 Sultan Azlan Shah Cup	
220	178	12 January 2004	Germany	3–4	Malaysia National Hockey Stadium, Kuala Lumpur, Malaysia	2004 Sultan Azlan Shah Cup	
221	178	12 January 2004	Germany	3–4	Malaysia National Hockey Stadium, Kuala Lumpur, Malaysia	2004 Sultan Azlan Shah Cup	
222	179	14 January 2004	Malaysia	1–1	Malaysia National Hockey Stadium, Kuala Lumpur, Malaysia	2004 Sultan Azlan Shah Cup	
223	180	15 January 2004	Australia	2–2	Malaysia National Hockey Stadium, Kuala Lumpur, Malaysia	2004 Sultan Azlan Shah Cup	
224	181	18 January 2004	Australia	3–4	Malaysia National Hockey Stadium, Kuala Lumpur, Malaysia	2004 Sultan Azlan Shah Cup	
225	181	18 January 2004	Australia	3–4	Malaysia National Hockey Stadium, Kuala Lumpur, Malaysia	2004 Sultan Azlan Shah Cup	
226	182	2 March 2004	Canada	4–2	Club de Campo, Madrid, Spain	2004 Olympic Qualifiers	
227	182	2 March 2004	Canada	4–2	Club de Campo, Madrid, Spain	2004 Olympic Qualifiers	
228	184	6 March 2004	India	5–3	Club de Campo, Madrid, Spain	2004 Olympic Qualifiers	
229	184	6 March 2004	India	5–3	Club de Campo, Madrid, Spain	2004 Olympic Qualifiers	
230	184	6 March 2004	India	5–3	Club de Campo, Madrid, Spain	2004 Olympic Qualifiers	
231	184	6 March 2004	India	5–3	Club de Campo, Madrid, Spain	2004 Olympic Qualifiers	
232	186	9 March 2004	New Zealand	1–4	Club de Campo, Madrid, Spain	2004 Olympic Qualifiers	
233	186	9 March 2004	New Zealand	1–4	Club de Campo, Madrid, Spain	2004 Olympic Qualifiers	
234	188	13 March 2004	India	2–4	Club de Campo, Madrid, Spain	2004 Olympic Qualifiers	
235	189	6 June 2004	Australia	2–1	Chase Park Cannock Hockey Club, Cannock, England	Tri–Nation Series	
236	190	7 June 2004	Great Britain	3–2	Chase Park Cannock Hockey Club, Cannock, England	Tri–Nation Series	
237	191	10 June 2004	Australia	3–2	Highfields Hockey Centre, Nottingham, England	Tri–Nation Series	
238	191	10 June 2004	Australia	3–2	Highfields Hockey Centre, Nottingham, England	Tri–Nation Series	
239	193	13 June 2004	Germany	3–1	Hockey Olympiastadion, Berlin, Germany	Test match	
240	194	14 June 2004	Germany	2–1	Hockeystadion SC Charlottenburg, Berlin, Germany	Test match	
241	195	18 June 2004	South Korea	1–1	Uhlenhorster Hockey Club, Hamburg, Germany	2004 Hamburg Masters	
242	196	19 June 2004	Argentina	6–3	Uhlenhorster Hockey Club, Hamburg, Germany	2004 Hamburg Masters	
243	197	20 June 2004	Germany	3–2	Uhlenhorster Hockey Club, Hamburg, Germany	2004 Hamburg Masters	
244	199	29 June 2004	India	6–1	Wagener Stadium, Amstelveen, Netherlands	2004 Hockey RaboTrophy	
245	199	29 June 2004	India	6–1	Wagener Stadium, Amstelveen, Netherlands	2004 Hockey RaboTrophy	
246	201	3 July 2004	India	5–3	Wagener Stadium, Amstelveen, Netherlands	2004 Hockey RaboTrophy	
247	201	3 July 2004	India	5–3	Wagener Stadium, Amstelveen, Netherlands	2004 Hockey RaboTrophy	
248	202	31 July 2004	Argentina	2–2	Club de Hockey Alcalá, Alcalá la Real, Spain	Tri–Nation Series	
249	203	1 August 2004	Spain	1–3	Club de Hockey Alcalá, Alcalá la Real, Spain	Tri–Nation Series	
250	203	1 August 2004	Spain	1–3	Club de Hockey Alcalá, Alcalá la Real, Spain	Tri–Nation Series	
251	205	17 August 2004	Egypt	0–7	Hellinikon Olympic Hockey Centre, Athens, Greece	2004 Summer Olympics	
252	205	17 August 2004	Egypt	0–7	Hellinikon Olympic Hockey Centre, Athens, Greece	2004 Summer Olympics	
253	205	17 August 2004	Egypt	0–7	Hellinikon Olympic Hockey Centre, Athens, Greece	2004 Summer Olympics	
254	205	17 August 2004	Egypt	0–7	Hellinikon Olympic Hockey Centre, Athens, Greece	2004 Summer Olympics	
255	206	19 August 2004	South Korea	3–0	Hellinikon Olympic Hockey Centre, Athens, Greece	2004 Summer Olympics	
256	208	23 August 2004	Great Britain	8–2	Hellinikon Olympic Hockey Centre, Athens, Greece	2004 Summer Olympics	
257	208	23 August 2004	Great Britain	8–2	Hellinikon Olympic Hockey Centre, Athens, Greece	2004 Summer Olympics	
258	209	25 August 2004	India	3–0	Hellinikon Olympic Hockey Centre, Athens, Greece	2004 Summer Olympics	
259	210	27 August 2004	New Zealand	2–4	Hellinikon Olympic Hockey Centre, Athens, Greece	2004 Summer Olympics	
260	210	27 August 2004	New Zealand	2–4	Hellinikon Olympic Hockey Centre, Athens, Greece	2004 Summer Olympics	
261	210	27 August 2004	New Zealand	2–4	Hellinikon Olympic Hockey Centre, Athens, Greece	2004 Summer Olympics	
262	211	24 September 2004	India	2–1	Hockey Club of Pakistan, Karachi, Pakistan	Test match	
263	213	29 September 2004	India	3–2	Lala Ayub Stadium, Peshawar, Pakistan	Test match	
264	214	1 October 2004	India	4–4	National Hockey Stadium, Lahore, Pakistan	Test match	
265	214	1 October 2004	India	4–4	National Hockey Stadium, Lahore, Pakistan	Test match	
266	215	4 October 2004	India	1–3	Major Dhyan Chand National Stadium, New Delhi, India	Test match	
267	215	4 October 2004	India	1–3	Major Dhyan Chand National Stadium, New Delhi, India	Test match	
268	217	8 October 2004	India	1–2	Guru Nank Dev University Stadium, Amritsar, India	Test match	
269	219	4 December 2004	Germany	3–1	National Hockey Stadium, Lahore, Pakistan	2004 Hockey Champions Trophy	
270	220	5 December 2004	New Zealand	1–3	National Hockey Stadium, Lahore, Pakistan	2004 Hockey Champions Trophy	
271	220	5 December 2004	New Zealand	1–3	National Hockey Stadium, Lahore, Pakistan	2004 Hockey Champions Trophy	
272	221	7 December 2004	Netherlands	1–4	National Hockey Stadium, Lahore, Pakistan	2004 Hockey Champions Trophy	
273	222	8 December 2004	India	2–1	National Hockey Stadium, Lahore, Pakistan	2004 Hockey Champions Trophy	
274	224	12 December 2004	India	3–2	National Hockey Stadium, Lahore, Pakistan	2004 Hockey Champions Trophy	
275	225	22 July 2006	Australia	3–2	Atlètic Terrassa Hockey Club, Terrassa, Spain	2006 Hockey Champions Trophy	
276	225	22 July 2006	Australia	3–2	Atlètic Terrassa Hockey Club, Terrassa, Spain	2006 Hockey Champions Trophy	
277	226	23 July 2006	Germany	3–3	Atlètic Terrassa Hockey Club, Terrassa, Spain	2006 Hockey Champions Trophy	
278	226	23 July 2006	Germany	3–3	Atlètic Terrassa Hockey Club, Terrassa, Spain	2006 Hockey Champions Trophy	
279	228	27 July 2006	Spain	2–3	Atlètic Terrassa Hockey Club, Terrassa, Spain	2006 Hockey Champions Trophy	
280	230	29 July 2006	Argentina	3–1	Atlètic Terrassa Hockey Club, Terrassa, Spain	2006 Hockey Champions Trophy	
281	231	25 August 2006	Germany	1–2	Uhlenhorster HC, Hamburg, Germany	2006 Hamburg Masters	
282	232	26 August 2006	Netherlands	6–4	Uhlenhorster HC, Hamburg, Germany	2006 Hamburg Masters	
283	232	26 August 2006	Netherlands	6–4	Uhlenhorster HC, Hamburg, Germany	2006 Hamburg Masters	
284	232	26 August 2006	Netherlands	6–4	Uhlenhorster HC, Hamburg, Germany	2006 Hamburg Masters	
285	234	7 September 2006	Japan	4–0	Warsteiner HockeyPark, Mönchengladbach, Germany	2006 FIH Hockey World Cup	
286	234	7 September 2006	Japan	4–0	Warsteiner HockeyPark, Mönchengladbach, Germany	2006 FIH Hockey World Cup	
287	236	10 September 2006	Spain	2–2	Warsteiner HockeyPark, Mönchengladbach, Germany	2006 FIH Hockey World Cup	
288	239	15 September 2006	Netherlands	2–3	Warsteiner HockeyPark, Mönchengladbach, Germany	2006 FIH Hockey World Cup	
289	240	10 May 2009	India	2–3	Kuantan Hockey Stadium, Kuantan, Malaysia	2009 Hockey Asia Cup	
290	243	31 October 2009	Italy	5–0	Lille Hockey Club, Lille, France	2009 World Cup Qualifiers	
291	243	31 October 2009	Italy	5–0	Lille Hockey Club, Lille, France	2009 World Cup Qualifiers	
292	244	1 November 2009	Russia	5–0	Lille Hockey Club, Lille, France	2009 World Cup Qualifiers	
293	245	3 November 2009	France	2–4	Lille Hockey Club, Lille, France	2009 World Cup Qualifiers	
294	245	3 November 2009	France	2–4	Lille Hockey Club, Lille, France	2009 World Cup Qualifiers	
295	246	5 November 2009	Japan	1–6	Lille Hockey Club, Lille, France	2009 World Cup Qualifiers	
296	246	5 November 2009	Japan	1–6	Lille Hockey Club, Lille, France	2009 World Cup Qualifiers	
297	248	8 November 2009	Japan	3–1	Lille Hockey Club, Lille, France	2009 World Cup Qualifiers	
298	248	8 November 2009	Japan	3–1	Lille Hockey Club, Lille, France	2009 World Cup Qualifiers	
299	249	6 December 2009	Canada	2–1	Salta Hockey Association Park, Salta, Argentina	2009 Hockey Champions Challenge	
300	249	6 December 2009	Canada	2–1	Salta Hockey Association Park, Salta, Argentina	2009 Hockey Champions Challenge	
301	250	8 December 2009	Argentina	3–1	Salta Hockey Association Park, Salta, Argentina	2009 Hockey Champions Challenge	
302	251	10 December 2009	South Africa	4–1	Salta Hockey Association Park, Salta, Argentina	2009 Hockey Champions Challenge	
303	252	6 December 2009	India	3–6	Salta Hockey Association Park, Salta, Argentina	2009 Hockey Champions Challenge	
304	252	6 December 2009	India	3–6	Salta Hockey Association Park, Salta, Argentina	2009 Hockey Champions Challenge	
305	253	13 December 2009	New Zealand	4–2	Salta Hockey Association Park, Salta, Argentina	2009 Hockey Champions Challenge	
306	257	21 January 2010	Netherlands	2–2	Al Rayaan Stadium, Doha, Qatar	Test match	
307	258	28 February 2010	India	4–1	Major Dhyan Chand National Stadium, New Delhi, India	2010 Hockey World Cup	
308	262	8 March 2010	Australia	2–1	Major Dhyan Chand National Stadium, New Delhi, India	2010 Hockey World Cup	
309	264	17 November 2010	Hong Kong	12–0	Aoti Hockey Field, Guangzhou, China	2010 Asian Games	
310	264	17 November 2010	Hong Kong	12–0	Aoti Hockey Field, Guangzhou, China	2010 Asian Games	
311	265	18 November 2010	Japan	2–8	Aoti Hockey Field, Guangzhou, China	2010 Asian Games	
312	265	18 November 2010	Japan	2–8	Aoti Hockey Field, Guangzhou, China	2010 Asian Games	
313	267	21 November 2010	Bangladesh	2–8	Aoti Hockey Field, Guangzhou, China	2010 Asian Games	
314	267	21 November 2010	Bangladesh	2–8	Aoti Hockey Field, Guangzhou, China	2010 Asian Games	
315	269	23 November 2010	Malaysia	2–0	Aoti Hockey Field, Guangzhou, China	2010 Asian Games	
316	271	6 May 2011	South Korea	4–2	Azlan Shah Stadium, Ipoh, Malaysia	2011 Sultan Azlan Shah Cup	
317	272	8 May 2011	Great Britain	3–2	Azlan Shah Stadium, Ipoh, Malaysia	2011 Sultan Azlan Shah Cup	
318	273	9 May 2011	Australia	1–5	Azlan Shah Stadium, Ipoh, Malaysia	2011 Sultan Azlan Shah Cup	
319	274	11 May 2011	India	1–3	Azlan Shah Stadium, Ipoh, Malaysia	2011 Sultan Azlan Shah Cup	
320	275	14 May 2011	Malaysia	3–2	Azlan Shah Stadium, Ipoh, Malaysia	2011 Sultan Azlan Shah Cup	
321	276	15 May 2011	Australia	3–2	Azlan Shah Stadium, Ipoh, Malaysia	2011 Sultan Azlan Shah Cup	
322	278	22 June 2011	China	2–3	UCD National Hockey Stadium, Dublin, Republic of Ireland	UCD Four Nations Dublin	
323	279	24 June 2011	Ireland	1–2	UCD National Hockey Stadium, Dublin, Republic of Ireland	UCD Four Nations Dublin	
324	280	25 June 2011	Ireland	2–1	UCD National Hockey Stadium, Dublin, Republic of Ireland	UCD Four Nations Dublin	
325	280	25 June 2011	Ireland	2–1	UCD National Hockey Stadium, Dublin, Republic of Ireland	UCD Four Nations Dublin	
326	281	29 June 2011	England	2–2	Wagener Stadium, Amsterdam, Netherlands	2011 Hockey RaboTrophy	
327	284	6 July 2011	New Zealand	4–1	Wagener Stadium, Amsterdam, Netherlands	Test match	
328	287	15 July 2011	Netherlands	2–2	Wagener Stadium, Amsterdam, Netherlands	Test match	
329	288	16 July 2011	Netherlands	2–1	Wagener Stadium, Amsterdam, Netherlands	Test match	
330	290	28 October 2011	India	3–3	Busselton Hockey Stadium, Busselton, Australia	Tri–Nation Series	
331	290	28 October 2011	India	3–3	Busselton Hockey Stadium, Busselton, Australia	Tri–Nation Series	
332	291	30 October 2011	Australia	8–2	Bunbury Hockey Stadium, Bunbury, Australia	Tri–Nation Series	
333	291	30 October 2011	Australia	8–2	Bunbury Hockey Stadium, Bunbury, Australia	Tri–Nation Series	
334	292	1 November 2011	India	1–1	Bunbury Hockey Stadium, Bunbury, Australia	Tri–Nation Series	
335	293	3 November 2011	Australia	3–4	Perth Hockey Stadium, Perth, Australia	Tri–Nation Series	
336	295	5 December 2011	Spain	4–2	North Harbor Hockey Stadium, Auckland, New Zealand	2011 Hockey Champions Trophy	
337	296	24 May 2012	Argentina	4–2	Azlan Shah Stadium, Ipoh, Malaysia	2012 Sultan Azlan Shah Cup	
338	300	31 May 2012	India	2–1	Azlan Shah Stadium, Ipoh, Malaysia	2012 Sultan Azlan Shah Cup	
339	302	11 June 2012	Belgium	6–1	Sportcentrum Wilrijkse Plein, Antwerp, Belgium	Test match	
340	303	13 June 2012	Germany	3–4	KTHC Stadion Rot–Weiss Köln, Cologne, Germany	Test match	
341	303	13 June 2012	Germany	3–4	KTHC Stadion Rot–Weiss Köln, Cologne, Germany	Test match	
342	303	13 June 2012	Germany	3–4	KTHC Stadion Rot–Weiss Köln, Cologne, Germany	Test match	
343	303	13 June 2012	Germany	3–4	KTHC Stadion Rot–Weiss Köln, Cologne, Germany	Test match	
344	307	1 August 2012	Argentina	2–0	Riverbank Arena, London, England	2012 Summer Olympics	
345	308	3 August 2012	Great Britain	4–1	Riverbank Arena, London, England	2012 Summer Olympics	
346	309	5 August 2012	South Africa	5–4	Riverbank Arena, London, England	2012 Summer Olympics	
347	Unofficial match	12 August 2003	Netherlands	4–4	Amstelveen, Netherlands	Test match	
348	Unofficial match	12 August 2003	Netherlands	4–4	Amstelveen, Netherlands	Test match	

== Hat-tricks ==
No.	Date	Venue	Goals	Opponent	Result	Competition	Ref.
1	10 December 1998	Queen Siritkit Sport Complex, Bangkok, Thailand	3 ^{9', 32', 50'}	Hong Kong	5-0	1998 Asian Games	
2	5 April 1999	Malaysia National Hockey Stadium, Kuala Lumpur, Malaysia	3 ^{24', 53', 59'}	New Zealand	5-2	1999 Sultan Azlan Shah Cup	
3	17 August 1999	Cornaredo Stadium, Lugano, Switzerland	3 ^{47', 59', 65'}	Switzerland	3-6	Test match	
4	21 August 1999	Hockey Club Rotweiss Wettingen, Wettingen, Switzerland	5 ^{9', 26', 41', 47', 60'}	Switzerland	4-8	Tri-Nation Series	
5	19 November 1999	Malaysia National Hockey Stadium, Kuala Lumpur, Malaysia	7 ^{2', 11', 20', 38', 42', 48', 55'}	Sri Lanka	15-0	1999 Hockey Asia Cup	
6	21 November 1999	Malaysia National Hockey Stadium, Kuala Lumpur, Malaysia	3 ^{19', 42', 50', 61'}	China	10-1	1999 Hockey Asia Cup	
7	23 November 1999	Malaysia National Hockey Stadium, Kuala Lumpur, Malaysia	3 ^{17', 25', 63'}	Bangladesh	6-0	1999 Hockey Asia Cup	
8	11 March 2000	Nagai Sports Ground, Osaka, Japan	4 ^{4', 8', 26', 41'}	Spain	4-4	2000 Olympic Qualifiers	
9	13 March 2000	Nagai Sports Ground, Osaka, Japan	3 ^{21', 25', 40'}	Belarus	6-0	2000 Olympic Qualifiers	
10	18 September 2000	Sydney Olympic Park Hockey Center, Sydney, Australia	3 ^{7', 10', 31'}	Great Britain	1-8	2000 Summer Olympics	
11	18 March 2001	Maulana Bhasani Hockey Stadium, Dhaka, Bangladesh	3 ^{8', 18', 39'}	Japan	5-3	Gold Cup Tournament Dhaka	
12	24 June 2001	UHC Clubanlage, Hamburg, Germany	3 ^{17', 40', 63'}	South Korea	8-6	2001 Hamburg Masters	
13	8 August 2001	Azlan Shah Stadium, Kuala Lumpur, Malaysia	3 ^{7', 62', 62'}	Malaysia	3-4	2001 Sultan Azlan Shah Cup	
14	7 November 2001	Hazelaarweg Stadion, Rotterdam, Netherlands	3 ^{34', 35', 51'}	Germany	4-5	2001 Champions Trophy	
15	27 July 2002	Belle Vue Hockey Centre, Manchester, England	3 ^{34', 35', 51'}	England	0-3	2002 Commonwealth Games	
16	4 August 2002	Belle Vue Hockey Centre, Manchester, England	5 ^{11', 33', 34', 42', 48'}	South Africa	10-2	2002 Commonwealth Games	
17	9 January 2004	Malaysia National Hockey Stadium, Kuala Lumpur, Malaysia	3 ^{13', 27', 51'}	India	3-2	2004 Sultan Azlan Shah Cup	
18	12 January 2004	Malaysia National Hockey Stadium, Kuala Lumpur, Malaysia	3 ^{42', 51', 59'}	Germany	3-4	2004 Sultan Azlan Shah Cup	
19	6 March 2004	Club de Campo, Madrid, Spain	4 ^{2', 28', 41', 62'}	India	5-3	2004 Olympic Qualifiers	
20	17 August 2004	Hellinikon Olympic Hockey Centre, Athens, Greece	4 ^{30', 34', 38', 58'}	Egypt	0-7	2004 Summer Olympics	
21	27 August 2004	Hellinikon Olympic Hockey Centre, Athens, Greece	3 ^{35', 47', 68'}	New Zealand	2-4	2004 Summer Olympics	
22	26 August 2006	Uhlenhorster HC, Hamburg, Germany	3 ^{27', 62', 69'}	Netherlands	6-4	2006 Hamburg Masters	
23	13 June 2012	KTHC Stadion Rot-Weiss Köln, Cologne, Germany	4 ^{23', 41', 52', 58'}	Germany	3-4	Test match	

== Statistics ==
Caps and Goals by year
Year	Caps	Goals
1998	31	20
1999	36	60
2000	21	26
2001	29	37
2002	36	44
2003	21	30
2004	50	59
2006	16	14
2009	15	17
2010	14	10
2011	26	21
2012	16	10
Total	311	348

Goals by Competition
Competition	Goals
Test matches	65
Invitational Tournaments	63
Sultan Azlan Shah Cup	45
Hockey Champions Trophy	41
Hockey Asia Cup	24
Asian Games	23
Summer Olympics	22
Olympic Qualifiers	22
FIH Hockey World Cup	18
World Cup Qualifiers	9
Commonwealth Games	9
Hockey Champions Challenge	7
Total	348

Goals by opponent
Opponent	Goals
India	54
Germany	30
Australia	28
Malaysia	26
Netherlands	24
Spain	24
South Korea	17
New Zealand	16
Japan	14
Argentina	12
China	11
England	10
Switzerland	10
Bangladesh	9
South Africa	9
Canada	8
Great Britain	8
Sri Lanka	7
Belgium	6
Egypt	4
France	4
Belarus	3
Hong Kong	5
Ireland	5
Italy	2
Russia	1
Thailand	1
Total	348
