= 2004 Women's Hockey RaboTrophy =

Tournament details
- Host country: Netherlands
- City: Amsterdam
- Teams: 4
- Venue(s): Wagener Stadium

Final positions
- Champions: Netherlands (1st title)
- Runner-up: South Korea
- Third place: China

Tournament statistics
- Matches played: 12
- Goals scored: 40 (3.33 per match)
- Top scorer(s): (Netherlands) Maartje Goderie (South Korea) Lee Mi-Seong (3 goals)

The 2004 Women's Hockey RaboTrophy was the second edition of the women's field hockey tournament. The RaboTrophy was held in Amsterdam from 26 June to 4 July 2004, and featured four of the top nations in women's field hockey.

The Netherlands won the tournament for the first time, finishing top of the ladder at the conclusion of the pool stage.

The tournament was held in conjunction with the Men's RaboTrophy.

== Competition format ==
The four teams competed in a pool stage, played in a double round robin format. Standings at the conclusion of the pool stage determined final placings.

== Teams ==
The following four teams competed for the title:

- China
- Germany
- Netherlands
- South Korea

== Officials ==
The following umpires were appointed by the International Hockey Federation to officiate the tournament:

- Renée Cohen (NED)
- Jean Duncan (SCO)
- Christiane Hippler (GER)
- Lee Mi-Ok (KOR)
- Hu Youfang (CHN)

== Results ==
All times are local (Central European Time).

=== Pool ===
| Pos | Team | Pld | W | D | L | GF | GA | GD | Pts | Result |
|---|---|---|---|---|---|---|---|---|---|---|
| 1 | Netherlands (H) | 6 | 3 | 1 | 2 | 14 | 12 | +2 | 10 | Tournament Champion |
| 2 | South Korea | 6 | 3 | 1 | 2 | 11 | 9 | +2 | 10 | |
| 3 | China | 6 | 2 | 3 | 1 | 8 | 7 | +1 | 9 | |
| 4 | Germany | 6 | 0 | 3 | 3 | 7 | 12 | −5 | 3 | |

Source: Rabobank Trophy
Rules for classification: 1) Points; 2) Goal difference; 3) Goals scored; 4) Games won; 5) Head-to-head.
(H) Hosts

==== Fixtures ====
26 June 2004
12:30

| South Korea | 2–2 | China |
|---|---|---|
| Lee J. 4'; Ko 46' | Report | Ma Y. 43'; Chen Z. 56' |

Umpires:
Jean Duncan (SCO)
Christiane Hippler (GER)

26 June 2004
15:00

| Netherlands | 3–3 | Germany |
|---|---|---|
| Snoeks 27'; Scheepstra 47'; Boomgaardt 54' | Report | Rinne 24'; Kühn 28'; Casaretto 32' |

Umpires:
Lee Mi-Ok (KOR)
Hu Youfang (CHN)

27 June 2004
11:00

| China | 0–0 | Germany |
|---|---|---|
| | Report |

Umpires:
Renée Cohen (NED)
Lee Mi-Ok (KOR)

27 June 2004
13:00

| South Korea | 3–2 | Netherlands |
|---|---|---|
| Lee M. 23', 35'; Lee S. 65' | Report | Donners 47', 70' |

Umpires:
Christiane Hippler (GER)
Jean Duncan (SCO)

29 June 2004
12:00

| Germany | 2–4 | South Korea |
|---|---|---|
| Rodewald 7'; Ernsting-Krienke 29' | Report | Kim J. 22'; Kim Y. 45', 46'; Park M. 48' |

Umpires:
Hu Youfang (CHN)
Renée Cohen (NED)

29 June 2004
16:00

| Netherlands | 1–2 | China |
|---|---|---|
| Boomgaardt 11' | Report | Fu 26'; Zhou 55' |

Umpires:
Lee Mi-Ok (KOR)
Jean Duncan (SCO)

30 June 2004
17:00

| China | 1–0 | South Korea |
|---|---|---|
| Gao L. 10' | Report |

Umpires:
Christiane Hippler (GER)
Renée Cohen (NED)

30 June 2004
19:30

| Germany | 1–3 | Netherlands |
|---|---|---|
| Ernsting-Krienke 60' | Report | Goderie 13'; Hoog 46'; Karres 52' |

Umpires:
Lee Mi-Ok (KOR)
Hu Youfang (CHN)

3 July 2004
12:30

| Germany | 1–1 | China |
|---|---|---|
| Kollmar 54' | Report | Chen Q. 64' |

Umpires:
Jean Duncan (SCO)
Renée Cohen (NED)

3 July 2004
15:00

| Netherlands | 2–1 | South Korea |
|---|---|---|
| Goderie 18'; Van As 31' | Report | Nam 38' |

Umpires:
Hu Youfang (CHN)
Christiane Hippler (GER)

4 July 2004
10:00

| South Korea | 1–0 | Germany |
|---|---|---|
| Lee M. 16' | Report |

Umpires:
Renée Cohen (NED)
Hu Youfang (CHN)

3 July 2004
13:00

| China | 2–3 | Netherlands |
|---|---|---|
| Tang 62'; Chen Z. 65' | Report | Moreira de Melo 7'; Goderie 23'; Fuchs 40' |

Umpires:
Christiane Hippler (GER)
Jean Duncan (SCO)

== Statistics ==
=== Final standings ===
1. Netherlands
2. South Korea
3. China
4. Germany

=== Goalscorers ===
There were 40 goals scored in 12 matches, for an average of 3.33 goals per match.

3 goals

- (Netherlands) Maartje Goderie
- (South Korea) Lee Mi-Seong

2 goals

- (China) Chen Zhaoxia
- (Germany) Nadine Ernsting-Krienke
- (Netherlands) Ageeth Boomgaardt
- (Netherlands) Mijntje Donners
- (South Korea) Kim Yun-Mi

1 goal

- (China) Fu Baorong
- (China) Tang Chunling
- (China) Gao Lihua
- (China) Chen Qunqing
- (China) Zhou Wanfeng
- (China) Ma Yibo
- (Germany) Caroline Casaretto
- (Germany) Alexandra Kollmar
- (Germany) Anke Kühn
- (Germany) Fanny Rinne
- (Germany) Marion Rodewald
- (Netherlands) Naomi van As
- (Netherlands) Saskia Fuchs
- (Netherlands) Ellen Hoog
- (Netherlands) Sylvia Karres
- (Netherlands) Fatima Moreira de Melo
- (Netherlands) Maartje Scheepstra
- (Netherlands) Jiske Snoeks
- (South Korea) Nam Jin-A
- (South Korea) Lee Jin-Hee
- (South Korea) Kim Jin-Kyoung
- (South Korea) Ko Kwang-Min
- (South Korea) Park Mi-Hyun
- (South Korea) Lee Seon-Ok
