= 2018 Women's Hockey RaboTrophy =

Tournament details
- Host country: Netherlands
- City: Breda
- Teams: 4
- Venue(s): BH & BC Breda

Final positions
- Champions: Netherlands (3rd title)
- Runner-up: Japan
- Third place: Spain

Tournament statistics
- Matches played: 8
- Goals scored: 46 (5.75 per match)
- Top scorer(s): (Netherlands) Frédérique Matla (5 goals)

The 2018 Women's Hockey RaboTrophy was the fifth edition of the women's field hockey tournament. The RaboTrophy was held in Breda from 26 to 30 June 2018, and featured four of the top nations in women's field hockey.

The Netherlands won the tournament for the third time, defeating Japan 8–2 in the final.

The tournament was held in conjunction with the Men's FIH Champions Trophy.

== Competition format ==
The four teams competed in a pool stage, played in a single round robin format. At the conclusion of the pool stage, the top two teams contested the final, while the remaining two competed for third place.

== Teams ==
The following four teams competed for the title:

- China
- Japan
- Netherlands
- Spain

== Officials ==
The following umpires were appointed by the International Hockey Federation to officiate the tournament:

- Lisette Baljon (NED)
- Noelia Blanco (ESP)
- Junko Wagatsuma (JPN)
- Rebecca Woodcock (ENG)
- Liu Xiaoying (CHN)

== Results ==
All times are local (Central European Time).

=== Preliminary round ===
| Pos | Team | Pld | W | D | L | GF | GA | GD | Pts | Qualification |
|---|---|---|---|---|---|---|---|---|---|---|
| 1 | Netherlands (H) | 3 | 3 | 0 | 0 | 13 | 1 | +12 | 9 | Advanced to Final |
| 2 | Japan | 3 | 2 | 0 | 1 | 7 | 6 | +1 | 6 | Advanced to Final |
| 3 | China | 3 | 1 | 0 | 2 | 7 | 12 | −5 | 3 | |
| 4 | Spain | 3 | 0 | 0 | 3 | 3 | 11 | −8 | 0 | |

Source: FIH
Rules for classification: 1) Points; 2) Goal difference; 3) Goals scored; 4) Games won; 5) Head-to-head.
(H) Hosts

==== Fixtures ====
26 June 2018
14:00

| Japan | 3–1 | China |
|---|---|---|
| Yamada 11'; Nomura 24'; Kawamura 41' | Report | Dan 21' |

Umpires:
Lisette Baljon (NED)
Noelia Blanco (ESP)

26 June 2018
16:00

| Netherlands | 2–0 | Spain |
|---|---|---|
| Van Male 37'; Matla 59' | Report |

Umpires:
Liu Xiaoying (CHN)
Rebecca Woodcock (ENG)

27 June 2018
17:00

| Spain | 1–3 | Japan |
|---|---|---|
| Cano 50' | Report | Y. Nagai 6'; Kato 36', 50' |

Umpires:
Liu Xiaoying (CHN)
Lisette Baljon (NED)

27 June 2018
19:30

| Netherlands | 7–0 | China |
|---|---|---|
| Jonker 11', 51'; Van Maasakker 23', 50'; Leurink 24'; Welten 31'; Matla 40' | Report |

Umpires:
Junko Wagatsuma (JPN)
Rebecca Woodcock (ENG)

29 June 2018
17:00

| Spain | 2–6 | China |
|---|---|---|
| Magaz 31'; Riera 59' | Report | Liu 8', 21'; Zhang X. 41'; Xi 45'; Zhang J. 46'; Zhong 52' |

Umpires:
Rebecca Woodcock (ENG)
Junko Wagatsuma (JPN)

29 June 2018
19:30

| Japan | 1–4 | Netherlands |
|---|---|---|
| H. Nagai 41' | Report | Matla 4'; Zuidhof 20'; Van Geffen 47'; De Goede 55' |

Umpires:
Liu Xiaoying (CHN)
Noelia Blanco (ESP)

=== Classification round ===
==== Third and fourth place ====
30 June 2018
11:45

| China | 1–5 | Spain |
|---|---|---|
| Zhang J. 15' | Report | Pérez 3'; Riera 39'; Salvatella 45'; López 57'; Segú 58' |

Umpires:
Junko Wagatsuma (JPN)
Lisette Baljon (NED)

==== Final ====
30 June 2018
18:00

| Netherlands | 8–2 | Japan |
|---|---|---|
| Dirkse van den Heuvel 4'; Van Maasakker 9'; Welten 12'; Verschoor 28', 59'; Matla 41', 54'; Van Male 48' | Report | H. Nagai 10'; Y. Nagai 33' |

Umpires:
Rebecca Woodcock (ENG)
Liu Xiaoying (CHN)

== Statistics ==
=== Final standings ===
As per statistical convention in field hockey, matches decided in extra time are counted as wins and losses, while matches decided by penalty shoot-outs are counted as draws.

| Pos | Team | Pld | W | D | L | GF | GA | GD | Pts | Status |
|---|---|---|---|---|---|---|---|---|---|---|
| 1st place, gold medalist(s) | Netherlands (H) | 4 | 4 | 0 | 0 | 21 | 3 | +18 | 12 | Gold Medal |
| 2nd place, silver medalist(s) | Japan | 4 | 2 | 0 | 2 | 9 | 14 | −5 | 6 | Silver Medal |
| 3rd place, bronze medalist(s) | Spain | 4 | 1 | 0 | 3 | 8 | 12 | −4 | 3 | Bronze Medal |
| 4 | China | 4 | 1 | 0 | 3 | 8 | 17 | −9 | 3 | |

Source: FIH
(H) Hosts

=== Goalscorers ===
There were 46 goals scored in 8 matches, for an average of 5.75 goals per match.

5 goals

- (Netherlands) Frédérique Matla

3 goals

- (Netherlands) Caia van Maasakker

2 goals

- (China) Zhang Jinrong
- (China) Liu Meng
- (Japan) Hazuki Nagai
- (Japan) Yuri Nagai
- (Japan) Akiko Kato
- (Netherlands) Kelly Jonker
- (Netherlands) Kitty van Male
- (Netherlands) Maria Verschoor
- (Netherlands) Lidewij Welten
- (Spain) Lola Riera

1 goal

- (China) Dan Wen
- (China) Zhong Jiaqi
- (China) Xi Xiayun
- (China) Zhang Xindan
- (Japan) Motomi Kawamura
- (Japan) Kana Nomura
- (Japan) Aki Yamada
- (Netherlands) Carlien Dirkse van den Heuvel
- (Netherlands) Eva de Goede
- (Netherlands) Margot van Geffen
- (Netherlands) Laurien Leurink
- (Netherlands) Margot Zuidhof
- (Spain) Carmen Cano
- (Spain) María López
- (Spain) Alicia Magaz
- (Spain) Beatriz Pérez
- (Spain) Carola Salvatella
- (Spain) Marta Segú

Source: FIH
