= 2010 Women's Hockey RaboTrophy =

International field hockey prize

Tournament details
- Host country: Netherlands
- Teams: 4
- Venue(s): 4 (in 4 host cities)

Final positions
- Champions: Argentina (1st title)
- Runner-up: Netherlands
- Third place: New Zealand

Tournament statistics
- Matches played: 8
- Goals scored: 41 (5.13 per match)
- Top scorer(s): (Argentina) Noel Barrionuevo (China) Zhao Yudiao (Netherlands) Maartje Paumen (3 goals)

The 2010 Women's Hockey RaboTrophy was the fourth edition of the women's field hockey tournament. The RaboTrophy was held across four host cities in the Netherlands from 29 June to 4 July 2010, and featured four of the top nations in women's field hockey.

Argentina won the tournament for the first time, defeating the Netherlands 3–0 in the final.

== Competition format ==
The four teams competed in a pool stage, played in a single round robin format. At the conclusion of the pool stage, the top two teams contested the final, while the remaining two competed for third place.

== Teams ==
The following four teams competed for the title:

- Argentina
- China
- Netherlands
- New Zealand

== Officials ==
The following umpires were appointed by the International Hockey Federation to officiate the tournament:

- Karen Bennett (NZL)
- Soledad Iparraguirre (ARG)
- Wendy Stewart (CAN)
- Valentina Tomasi (ITA)
- Nicole Wajer (NED)

== Results ==
=== Preliminary round ===
Pos	Team	Pld	W	D	L	GF	GA	GD	Pts	Qualification
1	Netherlands (H)	3	3	0	0	13	3	+10	9	Advanced to Final
2	Argentina	3	2	0	1	8	8	0	6	Advanced to Final
3	China	3	0	1	2	7	12	−5	1	
4	New Zealand	3	0	1	2	5	10	−5	1	

Source: Rabo Trophy 2010
Rules for classification: 1) Points; 2) Goal difference; 3) Goals scored; 4) Games won; 5) Head-to-head.
(H) Hosts

==== Fixtures ====
29 June 2010
17:00

Argentina	2–1	New Zealand
Gulla 24'; García 41'	Report	Forgesson 52'

Alkmaar MHC, Alkmaar
Umpires:
Nicole Wajer (NED)
Valentina Tomasi (ITA)

29 June 2010
19:30

Netherlands	3–2	China
Paumen 2', 62'; Goderie 37'	Report	Zhao Y. 16'; Zhang L. 19'

Alkmaar MHC, Alkmaar
Umpires:
Soledad Iparraguirre (ARG)
Wendy Stewart (CAN)

1 July 2010
17:00

China	4–4	New Zealand
Ma Y. 14'; Gao L. 17'; Song 19'; Zhao Y. 44'	Report	Eshuis 3'; Glynn 22'; Flynn 65'; Michelsen 70+'

Gooische HC, Bussum
Umpires:
Soledad Iparraguirre (ARG)
Valentina Tomasi (ITA)

1 July 2010
19:30

Argentina	1–6	Netherlands
Barrionuevo 21'	Report	Van As 16'; Agliotti 26', 42'; Lammers 31', 52'; Paumen 69'

Gooische HC, Bussum
Umpires:
Wendy Stewart (CAN)
Karen Bennett (NZL)

3 July 2010
12:30

China	1–5	Argentina
Song 48'	Report	Rebecchi 9'; Barrionuevo 26', 59'; Merino 31'; Gulla 62'

EHV Enschede, Enschede
Umpires:
Nicole Wajer (NED)
Karen Bennett (NZL)

3 July 2010
15:00

Netherlands	4–0	New Zealand
De Goede 34', 48'; Welten 38', 40'	Report

EHV Enschede, Enschede
Umpires:
Soledad Iparraguirre (ARG)
Wendy Stewart (CAN)

=== Classification round ===
==== Third and fourth place ====
4 July 2010
12:30

China	2–3	New Zealand
Fu 2'; Zhao Y. 33'	Report	Eshuis 20'; C. Harrison 28'; Forgesson 59'

HOD Valkenswaard, Valkenswaard
Umpires:
Nicole Wajer (NED)
Wendy Stewart (CAN)

==== Final ====
4 July 2010
15:00

Netherlands	0–3	Argentina
	Report	Aymar 42'; Merino 47'; Rebecchi 68'

HOD Valkenswaard, Valkenswaard
Umpires:
Karen Bennett (NZL)
Valentina Tomasi (ITA)

== Statistics ==
=== Final standings ===
As per statistical convention in field hockey, matches decided in extra time are counted as wins and losses, while matches decided by penalty shoot-outs are counted as draws.

Pos	Team	Pld	W	D	L	GF	GA	GD	Pts	Status
1st place, gold medalist(s)	Argentina	4	3	0	1	11	8	+3	9	Gold Medal
2nd place, silver medalist(s)	Netherlands (H)	4	3	0	1	13	6	+7	9	Silver Medal
3rd place, bronze medalist(s)	New Zealand	4	1	1	2	8	12	−4	4	Bronze Medal
4	China	4	0	1	3	9	15	−6	1	

Source: Rabo Trophy 2010
(H) Hosts

=== Goalscorers ===
There were 41 goals scored in 8 matches, for an average of 5.12 goals per match.

3 goals

- (Argentina) Noel Barrionuevo
- (China) Zhao Yudiao
- (Netherlands) Maartje Paumen

2 goals

- (Argentina) Alejandra Gulla
- (Argentina) Delfina Merino
- (Argentina) Carla Rebecchi
- (China) Song Qingling
- (Netherlands) Marilyn Agliotti
- (Netherlands) Eva de Goede
- (Netherlands) Kim Lammers
- (Netherlands) Lidewij Welten
- (New Zealand) Clarissa Eshuis
- (New Zealand) Krystal Forgesson

1 goal

- (Argentina) Luciana Aymar
- (Argentina) Soledad García
- (China) Fu Baorong
- (China) Zhang Lang
- (China) Gao Lihua
- (China) Ma Yibo
- (Netherlands) Naomi van As
- (Netherlands) Maartje Goderie
- (New Zealand) Gemma Flynn
- (New Zealand) Katie Glynn
- (New Zealand) Charlotte Harrison
- (New Zealand) Stacey Michelsen
