= Field hockey at the 2017 SEA Games – Men's tournament =

SEA Games Men's Field Hockey Tournament
Tournament details
- Host country: Malaysia
- City: Kuala Lumpur
- Dates: 22 August 2017–29 August 2017
- Teams: 5
- Venue: Malaysia National Hockey Stadium

The men's field hockey tournament at the 2017 SEA Games was held from 22 to 29 August in Malaysia. In this tournament, 5 Southeast Asian teams played in the men's competition.

All matches were played at National Hockey Stadium in Bukit Jalil.

== Competition schedule ==
The following was the competition schedule for the men's field hockey competitions:

G	Group stage	B	3rd place play-off	F	Final

Tue 22	Wed 23	Thu 24	Fri 25	Sat 26	Sun 27	Mon 28	Tue 29	
G	G	G	G	G	G		B	F

== Participating nations ==
The following five teams participated for the competition.

- Indonesia (INA)
- Malaysia (MAS)
- Myanmar (MYA)
- Singapore (SGP)
- Thailand (THA)

== Draw ==
There was no official draw since only 5 teams participating in this competition. All teams are automatically drawn to one group.

== Results ==
- All times are Malaysia Standard Time (UTC+8).

=== Group stage ===
Pos	Team	Pld	W	D	L	GF	GA	GD	Pts	Final Result
1	Malaysia (H)	4	4	0	0	39	2	+37	12	Advanced to Gold medal match
2	Myanmar	4	2	1	1	8	10	−2	7	Advanced to Gold medal match
3	Singapore	4	2	1	1	12	17	−5	7	Advanced to Bronze medal match
4	Thailand	4	0	1	3	6	15	−9	1	Advanced to Bronze medal match
5	Indonesia	4	0	1	3	7	28	−21	1	

Updated to match(es) played on 27 August 2017. Source: KL2017 Official Website
Rules for classification: 1) points; 2) goal difference; 3) goals scored; 4) head-to-head result.
(H) Hosts

22 August 2017
15:30

Singapore	6–4	Indonesia
Silas Noor Shah 2'; Mohamed Sabri Yuhari 4'; Ferdaus Ashriq Zul'kepli 36', 56'; Enrico Marican 54'; Jan Vanderput 58'	Report	Hosea Kbarek 18', 44', 55'; Abdullah Al Akbar 21'

Umpires:
Saleh Albalushi (OMA)
Rais Zakaria (MAS)

22 August 2017
16:00

Thailand	2–4	Myanmar
Borirak Harapan 45', 59'	Report	Nyein Chan Aung 5', 43', 55'; Hein Min Zaw 35'

Umpires:
Salim Lucky (BAN)
Faris Ali (SGP)

23 August 2017
16:00

Singapore	2–2	Myanmar
Norman Teo 31'; Muhammad Farhan Kamsani 43'	Report	Zar Ni 25', 40'

Umpires:
Ilmu Wijaya (INA)
Rais Zakaria (MAS)

23 August 2017
20:00

Malaysia	18–1	Indonesia
Faizal Saari 1', 21', 43', 51', 56'; Fitri Saari 3', 17', 40'; Razie Rahim 5', 36', 44'; Shahril Saabah 6', 50'; Rashid Baharom 9', 29'; Ramadan Rosli 17', 59'; Nabil Noor 48'	Report	Abdullah Al Akbar 34'

Umpires:
Ye Kyaw Thu (MYA)
Noppodon Prompin (THA)

24 August 2017
20:00

Thailand	0–6	Malaysia
	Report	Azri Hassan 8'; Ramadan Rosli 9', 59'; Aiman Nik Rosemi 10'; Faizal Saari 15', 54'

Umpires:
Faris Ali (SGP)
Saleh Al Balushi (OMA)

25 August 2017
16:00

Myanmar	2–0	Indonesia
Aung Nyein Chan 49'; Thet Htwe 54'	Report

Umpires:
Faris Ali (SGP)
Salim Lucky (BAN)

26 August 2017
16:00

Indonesia	2–2	Thailand
Hosea Kbarek 18'; Abdullah Al Akbar 51'	Report	Surasak Thammueangkhun 43'; Seksit Samoechai 59'

Umpires:
Rais Zakaria (MAS)
Ye Kyaw Thu (MYA)

26 August 2017
20:00

Singapore	1–9	Malaysia
Enrico Marican 43'	Report	Aiman Nik Rosemi 2', 13'; Faizal Saari 5', 31', 40'; Fitri Saari 8'; Tengku Ahmad Tajuddin 26'; Razie Rahim 34'; Shahril Saabah 50'

Umpires:
Salim Lucky (BAN)
Noppodon Prompin (THA)

27 August 2017
18:00

Thailand	2–3	Singapore
Vong Lenbury 49'; Thanakrit Boon-Art 51'	Report	Mohamed Sabri Yuhari 26', 30', 39'

Umpires:
Saleh Al Balushi (OMA)
Ye Kyaw Thu (MYA)

27 August 2017
20:00

Malaysia	6–0	Myanmar
Shahril Saabah 10', 40'; Fitri Saari 14'; Razie Rahim 18', 23'; Aiman Nik Rosemi 41'	Report

Umpires:
Ilmu Wijaya (INA)
Noppodon Prompin (THA)

=== Bronze medal match ===
29 August 2017
16:00

Singapore	2–1	Thailand
Mohamed Sabri Yuhari 4'; Ian Vanderput 59'	Report	Seksit Samoechai 56'

Umpires:
Saleh Al Balushi (OMA)
Ilmu Wijaya (INA)

=== Gold medal match ===
29 August 2017
18:30

Malaysia	14–0	Myanmar
Razie Rahim 1', 17', 60'; Shahril Saabah 6', 27'; Ramadan Rosli 30'; Azuan Hasan 43'; Faizal Saari 46', 58'; Aiman Nik Rosemi 47', 58'; Fitri Saari 47'; Azri Hassan 52'; Rashid Baharom 53'	Report

Umpires:
Salim Lucky (BAN)
Noppodon Prompin (THA)

== See also ==
- Women's tournament
