= 2008 Women's Hockey RaboTrophy =

Tournament details
- Host country: Netherlands
- City: Rotterdam
- Teams: 4
- Venue(s): Hazelaarweg Stadion

Final positions
- Champions: Netherlands (2nd title)
- Runner-up: Great Britain
- Third place: South Africa

Tournament statistics
- Matches played: 8
- Goals scored: 33 (4.13 per match)
- Top scorer(s): (Netherlands) Maartje Paumen (7 goals)

The 2008 Women's Hockey RaboTrophy was the third edition of the women's field hockey tournament. The RaboTrophy was held in Rotterdam from 24 to 28 June 2008, and featured four of the top nations in women's field hockey.

The Netherlands won the tournament for the second time, defeating Great Britain 5–0 in the final.

The tournament was held in conjunction with the Men's FIH Champions Trophy.

== Competition format ==
The four teams competed in a pool stage, played in a single round robin format. At the conclusion of the pool stage, the top two teams contested the final, while the remaining teams played off for third place.

== Teams ==
The following four teams competed for the title:

- Great Britain
- India
- Netherlands
- South Africa

== Officials ==
The following umpires were appointed by the International Hockey Federation to officiate the tournament:

- Stella Bartlema (NED)
- Corrine Cornelius (RSA)
- Anne McRae (GBR)
- Carol Metchette (IRE)
- Anupama Puchimanda (IND)

== Results ==
All times are local (Central European Time).

=== Preliminary round ===
Pos	Team	Pld	W	D	L	GF	GA	GD	Pts	Qualification
1	Great Britain	3	3	0	0	7	3	+4	9	Advanced to Final
2	Netherlands (H)	3	2	0	1	10	6	+4	6	Advanced to Final
3	India	3	1	0	2	2	6	−4	3	
4	South Africa	3	0	0	3	3	7	−4	0	

Source: Champions Trophy
Rules for classification: 1) Points; 2) Goal difference; 3) Goals scored; 4) Games won; 5) Head-to-head.
(H) Hosts

==== Fixtures ====
24 June 2008
11:00

Great Britain	2–0	India
Richardson 32'; Wright 64'	Report

Umpires:
Corrine Cornelius (RSA)
Stella Bartlema (NED)

24 June 2008
17:00

South Africa	2–4	Netherlands
Taylor 17'; Vida Ryan 52'	Report	Schopman 29', 50'; Dijkstra 40', 64'

Umpires:
Anne McRae (GBR)
Anupama Puchimanda (IND)

25 June 2008
14:30

Great Britain	2–1	South Africa
Wright 26'; Rogers 48'	Report	Taylor 26'

Umpires:
Carol Metchette (IRE)
Anupama Puchimanda (IND)

25 June 2008
17:00

Netherlands	4–1	India
Paumen 5', 50', 70'; Dijkstra 35'	Report	Devi 18'

Umpires:
Anne McRae (GBR)
Corrine Cornelius (RSA)

27 June 2008
14:30

South Africa	0–1	India
	Report	Devi 54'

Umpires:
Stella Bartlema (NED)
Anne McRae (GBR)

27 June 2008
19:30

Netherlands	2–3	Great Britain
Paumen 20'; Agliotti 61'	Report	Cullen 30'; Danson 34'; Walker 55'

Umpires:
Carol Metchette (IRE)
Anupama Puchimanda (IND)

=== Classification round ===
==== Third and fourth place ====
28 June 2008
11:00

India	1–5	South Africa
Surinder 16'	Report	Marescia 11'; Taylor 12'; Vida Ryan 50', 69'; Wilson 68'

Umpires:
Stella Bartlema (NED)
Anne McRae (GBR)

==== Final ====
28 June 2008
17:30

Great Britain	0–5	Netherlands
	Report	Paumen 10', 22', 70'; Jonker 37'; Mulder 48'

Umpires:
Carol Metchette (IRE)
Corrine Cornelius (RSA)

== Statistics ==
=== Final standings ===
As per statistical convention in field hockey, matches decided in extra time are counted as wins and losses, while matches decided by penalty shoot-outs are counted as draws.

Pos	Team	Pld	W	D	L	GF	GA	GD	Pts	Status
1st place, gold medalist(s)	Netherlands (H)	4	3	0	1	15	6	+9	9	Gold Medal
2nd place, silver medalist(s)	Great Britain	4	3	0	1	7	8	−1	9	Silver Medal
3rd place, bronze medalist(s)	South Africa	4	1	0	3	8	8	0	3	Bronze Medal
4	India	4	1	0	3	3	11	−8	3	

Source: Champions Trophy
(H) Hosts

=== Goalscorers ===
There were 33 goals scored in 8 matches, for an average of 4.12 goals per match.

7 goals

- (Netherlands) Maartje Paumen

3 goals

- (Netherlands) Wieke Dijkstra
- (South Africa) Vida Ryan
- (South Africa) Kathleen Taylor

2 goals

- (United Kingdom) Lucilla Wright
- (India) Rani Devi
- (Netherlands) Janneke Schopman

1 goal

- (United Kingdom) Crista Cullen
- (United Kingdom) Alexandra Danson
- (United Kingdom) Helen Richardson
- (United Kingdom) Chloe Rogers
- (United Kingdom) Rachel Walker
- (India) Surinder Kaur
- (Netherlands) Marilyn Agliotti
- (Netherlands) Kelly Jonker
- (Netherlands) Eefke Mulder
- (South Africa) Marsha Marescia
- (South Africa) Jennifer Wilson
