= Field hockey at the 2017 SEA Games – Women's tournament =

SEA Games Women's Field Hockey Tournament
Tournament details
- Host country: Malaysia
- City: Kuala Lumpur
- Dates: 21 August 2017–28 August 2017
- Teams: 5
- Venue: Malaysia National Hockey Stadium

Final positions
- Champions: Malaysia (MAS)
- Runner-up: Thailand (THA)
- Third place: Singapore (SGP)

Tournament statistics
- Matches played: 12
- Goals scored: 52 (4.33 per match)
- Top scorer: (Malaysia) Nuraini Rashid (6 goals)

The women's field hockey tournament at the 2017 SEA Games was held from 21 to 28 August in Malaysia. In this tournament, 5 Southeast Asian teams played in the women's competition.

All matches were played at the National Hockey Stadium in Bukit Jalil.

== Competition schedule ==
The following was the competition schedule for the women's field hockey competitions:

G	Group stage	B	3rd place play-off	F	Final

Mon 21	Tue 22	Wed 23	Thu 24	Fri 25	Sat 26	Sun 27	Mon 28	
G	G	G	G	G	G		B	F

== Participating nations ==
The following five teams participated for the competition.

- Indonesia (INA)
- Malaysia (MAS)
- Myanmar (MYA)
- Singapore (SGP)
- Thailand (THA)

== Draw ==
There was no official draw since only 5 teams participating in this competition. All teams are automatically drawn to one group.

== Results ==
- All times are Malaysia Standard Time (UTC+8).

=== Group stage ===
Pos	Team	Pld	W	D	L	GF	GA	GD	Pts	Qualification
1	Malaysia (H)	4	4	0	0	30	0	+30	12	Advanced to Gold Medal Match
2	Thailand	4	2	1	1	7	5	+2	7	Advanced to Gold Medal Match
3	Singapore	4	2	0	2	7	7	0	6	Advanced to Bronze Medal Match
4	Indonesia	4	1	1	2	4	16	−12	4	Advanced to Bronze Medal Match
5	Myanmar	4	0	0	4	0	20	−20	0	

Updated to match(es) played on 26 August 2017. Source: KL2017 Official Website
Rules for classification: 1) points; 2) goal difference; 3) goals scored; 4) head-to-head result.
(H) Hosts

21 August 2017
18:00

Thailand	1–1	Indonesia
Sirikwan Wongkeaw 19'	Report	Debie Rani 58'

Umpires:
Emi Yamada (JPN)
Cookie Tan (SGP)

21 August 2017
20:00

Singapore	2–0	Myanmar
Nur Syaheeza Mohd Jefri 32'; Tiffany Ong 37'	Report

Umpires:
Binish Hayat (PAK)
Norasyikin Shariudin (MAS)

22 August 2017
18:00

Thailand	4–0	Myanmar
Natthakarn Aunjai 3'; Supansa Samanso 7'; Sirikwan Wongkeaw 22'; Praphatson Khuiklang 51'	Report

Umpires:
Susilowati Miharjo (INA)
Cookie Tan (SGP)

22 August 2017
20:00

Malaysia	11–0	Indonesia
Norfaiezah Saiuti 12', 32'; Nurul Mansur 14'; Norbaini Hashim 15'; Nuraini Rashid 22'; Siti Ruhani 26', 50'; Hanis Onn 29'; Syafiqah Mohd Zain 40'; Norazlin Sumantri 48'; Fatin Sukri 56'	Report

Umpires:
Kay Myo Khaing (MYA)
Thanittha Chuangmanichot (THA)

23 August 2017
18:00

Singapore	0–5	Malaysia
	Report	Surizan Awang Noh 27', 38'; Siti Ruhani 28'; Fatin Sukri 48'; Norsharina Shabuddin 57'

Umpires:
Emi Yamada (JPN)
Susilowati Miharjo (INA)

24 August 2017
18:00

Myanmar	0–3	Indonesia
	Report	Nuraisah 15'; Irianti Ratnaningsih 45'; Rayhan Uno 47'

Umpires:
Norasyikin Shariudin (MAS)
Thanittha Chuangmanichot (THA)

25 August 2017
18:00

Indonesia	0–4	Singapore
	Report	Jerelee Ong 52', 54'; Tiffany Ong 59'; Tam Wan Ting 60'

Umpires:
Emi Yamada (JPN)
Khaing Kay Myo (MYA)

25 August 2017
20:00

Thailand	0–3	Malaysia
	Report	Hanis Onn 31'; Nuraini Rashid 39'; Surizan Awang Noh 51'

Umpires:
Binish Hayat (PAK)
Tan Cookie (SGP)

26 August 2017
18:00

Malaysia	11–0	Myanmar
Nuraini Rashid 7', 15', 37'; Syafiqah Mohd Zain 15'; Norazlin Sumantri 21'; Norfaiezah Saiuti 36', 47'; Nuraslinda Said 50', 52'; Siti Ruhani 56'; Hanis Onn 57'	Report

Stadium:
Pitch 1, NHC KL Sports City
Umpires:
Susilowati Miharjo (INA)
Thanittha Chuangmanichot (THA)

26 August 2017
18:30

Singapore	1–2	Thailand
Nur Atiqah Abdull 55'	Report	Praphatson Khuiklang 23'; Kornkanok Sanpoung 34'

Stadium:
Pitch 2, NHC KL Sports City
Umpires:
Binish Hayat (PAK)
Khaing Kay Myo (MYA)

=== Bronze medal match ===
28 August 2017
16:00

Singapore	2–0	Indonesia
Hajaratih 11'; Ho 43'	Report

Umpires:
Thanittha Chuangmanichot (THA)
Norasyikin Shariudin (MAS)

=== Gold medal match ===
28 August 2017
18:30

Malaysia	2–0	Thailand
Hanis 46'; Nuraini 47'	Report

Umpires:
Emi Yamada (JPN)
Binish Hayat (PAK)

== See also ==
- Men's tournament
