= 2002 Men's Hockey RaboTrophy =

Tournament details
- Host country: Netherlands
- City: Amsterdam
- Teams: 4
- Venue(s): Wagener Stadium

Final positions
- Champions: Netherlands (1st title)
- Runner-up: Australia
- Third place: South Korea

Tournament statistics
- Matches played: 6
- Goals scored: 25 (4.17 per match)
- Top scorer(s): (Australia) Jamie Dwyer (4 goals)

The 2002 Men's Hockey RaboTrophy was the first edition of the men's field hockey tournament. The RaboTrophy was held in Amsterdam from 22 to 25 August 2002, and featured four of the top nations in men's field hockey.

The Netherlands won the tournament for the first time, finishing top of the ladder at the conclusion of the pool stage.

== Competition format ==
The four teams competed in a pool stage, played in a single round robin format. Standings at the conclusion of the pool stage determined final placings.

== Teams ==
The following four teams competed for the title:

- Australia
- India
- Netherlands
- South Korea

== Officials ==
The following umpires were appointed by the International Hockey Federation to officiate the tournament:

- Christian Bläsch (GER)
- David Gentles (AUS)
- Han Jin-Soo (KOR)
- Satinder Kumar (IND)
- Philip Schellekens (NED)

== Results ==
All times are local (Central European Time).

=== Pool ===
| Pos | Team | Pld | W | D | L | GF | GA | GD | Pts | Result |
|---|---|---|---|---|---|---|---|---|---|---|
| 1 | Netherlands (H) | 3 | 2 | 1 | 0 | 9 | 4 | +5 | 7 | Tournament Champion |
| 2 | Australia | 3 | 1 | 1 | 1 | 6 | 6 | 0 | 4 | |
| 3 | South Korea | 3 | 0 | 3 | 0 | 5 | 5 | 0 | 3 | |
| 4 | India | 3 | 0 | 1 | 2 | 5 | 10 | −5 | 1 | |

Source: Rabobank Trophy
Rules for classification: 1) Points; 2) Goal difference; 3) Goals scored; 4) Games won; 5) Head-to-head.
(H) Hosts

==== Fixtures ====
22 August 2002
17:30

| Australia | 2–2 | South Korea |
|---|---|---|
| Dwyer 20', 61' | Report | Kim Ju. 9'; Yeo 49' |

Umpires:
Christian Bläsch (GER)
Satinder Kumar (IND)

22 August 2002
19:30

| Netherlands | 5–2 | India |
|---|---|---|
| R. Brouwer 13'; Geeris 28'; M. Brouwer 31'; De Nooijer 41', 62' | Report | D. Tirkey 54'; Jugraj 69' |

Umpires:
David Gentles (AUS)
Han Jin-Soo (KOR)

24 August 2002
12:30

| India | 1–3 | Australia |
|---|---|---|
| Deepak 15' | Report | Smith 40', 65'; Dwyer 56' |

Umpires:
Philip Schellekens (NED)
Christian Bläsch (GER)

24 August 2002
15:00

| Netherlands | 1–1 | South Korea |
|---|---|---|
| Lomans 7' | Report | Ji 5' |

Umpires:
Satinder Kumar
David Gentles (AUS)

25 August 2002
12:30

| India | 2–2 | South Korea |
|---|---|---|
| D. Tirkey 58'; D. Pillay 59' | Report | Seo 8'; Hwang 61' |

Umpires:
David Gentles (AUS)
Philip Schellekens (NED)

25 August 2002
15:00

| Australia | 1–3 | Netherlands |
|---|---|---|
| Dwyer 48' | Report | Lomans 9', 38'; Brouwer 32' |

Umpires:
Han Jin-Soo (KOR)
Christian Bläsch (GER)

== Awards ==
The following awards were presented at the conclusion of the tournament:

| Top Goalscorer | Most Promising Player | Fair Play Trophy |
|---|---|---|
| (Australia) Jamie Dwyer | (Australia) Jamie Dwyer | South Korea |

== Statistics ==
=== Final standings ===
1. Netherlands
2. Australia
3. South Korea
4. India

=== Goalscorers ===
There were 25 goals scored in 6 matches, for an average of 4.17 goals per match.

4 goals

- (Australia) Jamie Dwyer

3 goals

- (Netherlands) Bram Lomans

2 goals

- (Australia) Andrew Smith
- (India) Dilip Tirkey
- (Netherlands) Matthijs Brouwer
- (Netherlands) Teun de Nooijer

1 goal

- (India) Dhanraj Pillay
- (India) Jugraj Singh
- (India) Deepak Thakur
- (Netherlands) Ronald Brouwer
- (Netherlands) Piet-Hein Geeris
- (South Korea) Seo Jong-Ho
- (South Korea) Hwang Jong-Hyun
- (South Korea) Kim Jung-Chul
- (South Korea) Ji Seung-Hwan
- (South Korea) Yeo Woon-Kon
