= 2011 Men's Hockey RaboTrophy =

Tournament details
- Host country: Netherlands
- City: Amsterdam
- Teams: 4
- Venue(s): Wagener Stadium

Final positions
- Champions: Netherlands (2nd title)
- Runner-up: England
- Third place: Germany

Tournament statistics
- Matches played: 6
- Goals scored: 23 (3.83 per match)
- Top scorer(s): (Netherlands) Jeroen Hertzberger (3 goals)

The 2011 Men's Hockey RaboTrophy was the fourth edition of the men's field hockey tournament. The RaboTrophy was held in Amsterdam from 29 June to 2 July 2011, and featured four of the top nations in men's field hockey.

The Netherlands won the tournament for the second time, finishing top of the ladder at the conclusion of the pool stage.

The tournament was held in conjunction with the Women's FIH Champions Trophy.

== Competition format ==
The four teams competed in a pool stage, played in a single round robin format. Standings at the conclusion of the pool stage determined final placings.

== Teams ==
The following four teams competed for the title:

- England
- Germany
- Netherlands
- Pakistan

== Officials ==
The following umpires were appointed by the International Hockey Federation to officiate the tournament:

- Daniel Barstow (ENG)
- Fabian Bläsch (GER)
- Coen van Bunge (NED)
- Haider Rasool (PAK)
- Marcelo Servetto (ESP)

== Results ==
All times are local (Central European Time).

=== Pool ===
| Pos | Team | Pld | W | D | L | GF | GA | GD | Pts | Result |
|---|---|---|---|---|---|---|---|---|---|---|
| 1 | Netherlands (H) | 3 | 2 | 1 | 0 | 8 | 3 | +5 | 7 | Tournament Champion |
| 2 | England | 3 | 1 | 2 | 0 | 7 | 6 | +1 | 5 | |
| 3 | Germany | 3 | 1 | 0 | 2 | 5 | 6 | −1 | 3 | |
| 4 | Pakistan | 3 | 0 | 1 | 2 | 3 | 8 | −5 | 1 | |

Source: Deustscher Hockey-Bund
Rules for classification: 1) Points; 2) Goal difference; 3) Goals scored; 4) Games won; 5) Head-to-head.
(H) Hosts

==== Fixtures ====
29 June 2011
17:30

| England | 2–2 | Pakistan |
|---|---|---|
| Smith 64'; Middleton 68' | Report | Abbas 8'; Abbasi 68' |

Umpires:
Fabian Bläsch (GER)
Coen van Bunge (NED)

29 June 2011
20:00

| Netherlands | 2–1 | Germany |
|---|---|---|
| Taekema 31'; Caspers 49' | Report | Stralkowski 30' |

Umpires:
Marcelo Servetto (ESP)
Haider Rasool (PAK)

1 July 2011
17:00

| Germany | 2–1 | Pakistan |
|---|---|---|
| Montag 35'; Fürste 44' | Report | Zubair 2' |

Umpires:
Daniel Barstow (ENG)
Marcelo Servetto (ESP)

1 July 2011
19:30

| England | 2–2 | Netherlands |
|---|---|---|
| Clarke 24'; Middleton 52' | Report | Hertzberger 9'; Hofman 45' |

Umpires:
Haider Rasool (PAK)
Fabian Bläsch (GER)

2 July 2011
15:00

| Germany | 2–3 | England |
|---|---|---|
| Stralkowski 22'; Korn 39' | Report | Brogdon 32'; Mackay 50'; Moore 68' |

Umpires:
Coen van Bunge (NED)
Marcelo Servetto (ESP)

2 July 2011
17:30

| Netherlands | 4–0 | Pakistan |
|---|---|---|
| Hertzberger 10', 57'; Weusthof 27', 35+' | Report |

Umpires:
Fabian Bläsch (GER)
Daniel Barstow (ENG)

== Statistics ==
=== Final standings ===
1. Netherlands
2. England
3. Germany
4. Pakistan

=== Goalscorers ===
There were 23 goals scored in 6 matches, for an average of 3.83 goals per match.

3 goals

- (Netherlands) Jeroen Hertzberger

2 goals

- (England) Barry Middleton
- (Germany) Thilo Stralkowski
- (Netherlands) Roderick Weusthof

1 goal

- (England) Alastair Brogdon
- (England) Jonty Clarke
- (England) Iain Mackay
- (England) Robert Moore
- (England) Richard Smith
- (Germany) Moritz Fürste
- (Germany) Oliver Korn
- (Germany) Jan-Marco Montag
- (Netherlands) Quirjin Caspers
- (Netherlands) Rogier Hofman
- (Netherlands) Taeke Taekema
- (Pakistan) Sohail Abbas
- (Pakistan) Shakeel Abbasi
- (Pakistan) Muhammad Zubair
