= Margot Zuidhof =

Dutch field hockey player (born 1992)

Personal information
- Born: 12 May 1992 (age 34) Helmond
- Height: 1.70 m (5 ft 7 in)

Sport
- Sport: Field hockey
- Position: Forward
- Club: Kampong
National team
Years	Team	Caps	Goals
2017–	Netherlands	15	(4)
Medal record
Champions Trophy
Gold medal – first place	2018 Changzhou

Margot Zuidhof (born 12 May 1992) is a Dutch field hockey player. Zuidhof played for HC Helmond and THC Hurley; she currently plays for SV Kampong.

Zuidhof made her debut for the Netherlands national team in January 2017 in a friendly match against Spain. She won the gold medal at the 2018 Champions Trophy in Changzhou, China.
