= Malaysia National Hockey Stadium =

Field hockey stadium in Kuala Lumpur, Malaysia

Malaysia National Field Hockey Stadium
- Stadium Hoki Nasional Malaysia
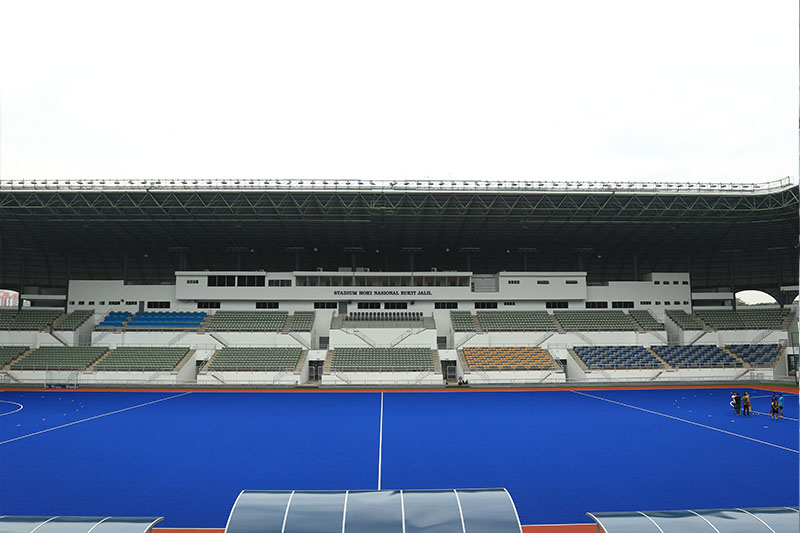
- Malaysia National Hockey Stadium
- Interactive map of Malaysia National Field Hockey Stadium
- Location: Bukit Jalil, Kuala Lumpur, Malaysia
- Coordinates: 3°3′32.29″N 101°41′36.95″E
- Owner: Malaysian Government
- Operator: KL Sports City
- Capacity: 12,000 (sports); 20,000 (maximum)
- Public transit: SP17 Bukit Jalil LRT station

Construction
- Built: 1997; 29 years ago
- Opened: 1998; 28 years ago
- Renovated: 2015–2017
- Reopened: July 2017; 9 years ago

Tenants
- Malaysia men's national field hockey team, Malaysia women's national field hockey team

Malaysia National Hockey Stadium (Malay: Stadium Hoki Nasional Malaysia) is a multi-use stadium in National Sports Complex, Bukit Jalil, Kuala Lumpur, Malaysia. It is currently used mostly for the Malaysia national field hockey team and the Malaysia women's national field hockey team. The main stadium holds up to 12,000 people and was built in 1997. There is a second pitch located adjacent to the stadium, with 2,000 seats and is used to hold smaller capacity as well as practice matches.

The stadium became the first FIH Global Elite Pitch in history, which was awarded for the main stadium and training field in 2017. The stadium is equipped with polyethylene artificial pitch, which was installed in 2019 making Malaysia the first nation to use the technology.

== Sporting events ==
- 1998 Commonwealth Games - field hockey
- 2001 Men's Hockey Champions Challenge
- 2002 Men's Hockey World Cup
- 2007 Men's Hockey Champions Trophy
- 2017 South East Asian Games - field hockey
- 2018–19 Men's FIH Series Finals
- 2023 Men's FIH Hockey Junior World Cup
- 2024–25 Men's FIH Hockey Nations Cup

== Entertainment events ==
Concerts and Showcases
Date	Main act(s)	Tour / Concert Name	Ref.
2024
22 June	Jiwakacau	Showcase Jiwa Kacau 2024	
7 September	Various Artists	Jiwa Malaysia Concert	
21 November	Imagine Dragons	Loom World Tour	
2025
1 February	2NE1	Welcome Back Tour	
12 February	Maroon 5	Asia 2025	
18 February	Green Day	The Saviors Tour Live in Kuala Lumpur	
25 October	Twice	This Is For World Tour	
2026
20 June	Exo	Exo Planet 6 – Exhorizon	
27 June	Hujan	The Hujan XX: 20th Anniversary Concert	
31 October	Jason Mraz	Jason Mraz Asia Tour 2026 Live in Kuala Lumpur	
28 November	Evanescence	Evanescence Live in Kuala Lumpur 2026	
9 December	Limp Bizkit	Limp Bizkit Live in Malaysia - One-Stop Asia Show	
