= Maartje Goderie =

Dutch field hockey player (born 1984)

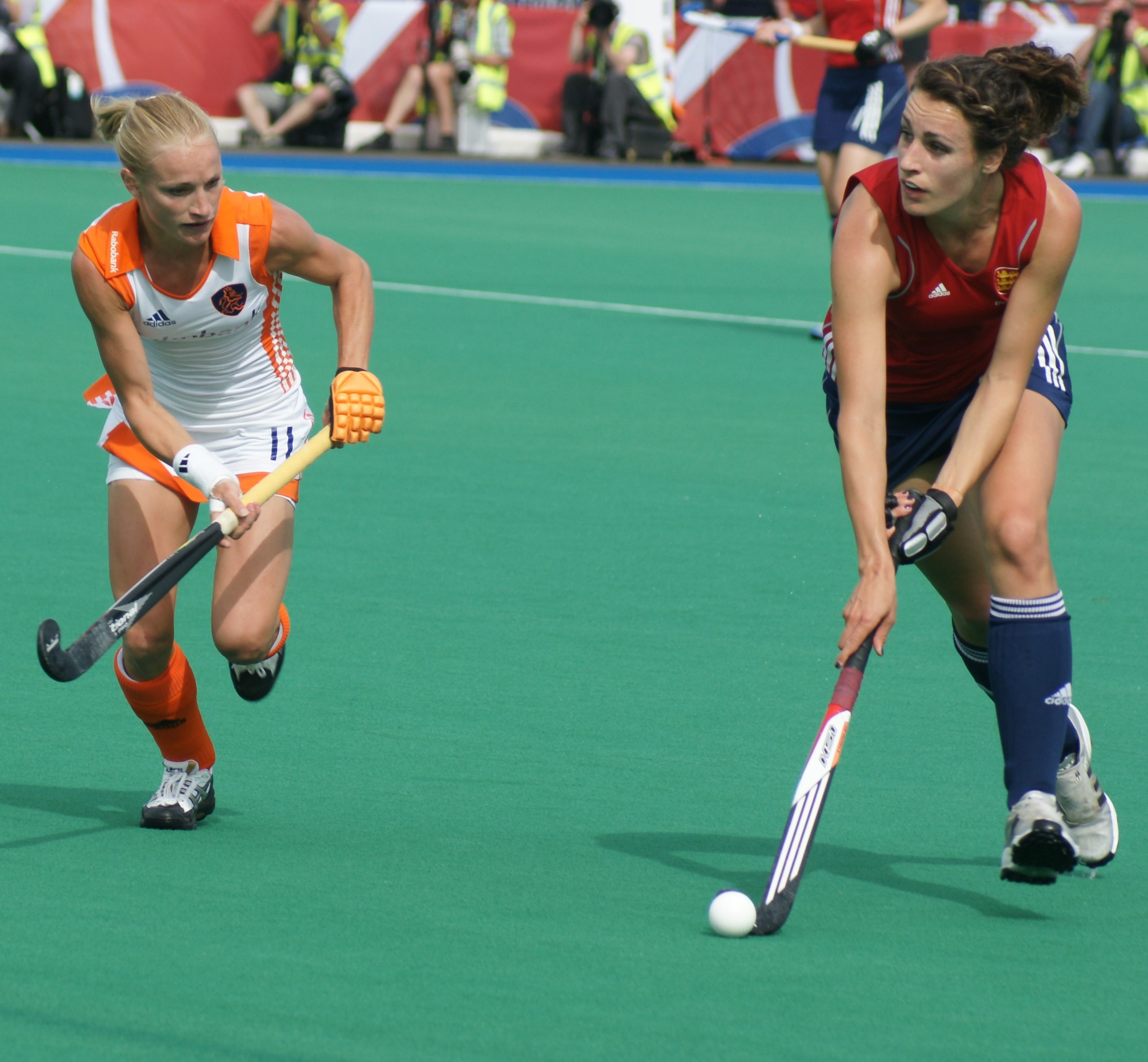
- Maartje Goderie (left) and Ashleigh Ball

Personal information
- Born: 5 April 1984 (age 42) Den Bosch, Netherlands
- Height: 1.58 m (5 ft 2 in)
- Weight: 50 kg (110 lb)

Sport
- Country: Netherlands
- Sport: Field hockey
Medal record
Olympic Games
Gold medal – first place	2008 Beijing	Team competition
Gold medal – first place	2012 London	Team competition
World Championship
Gold medal – first place	2006 Madrid	Team competition
Silver medal – second place	2010 Rosario	Team competition
European Championship
Gold medal – first place	2005 Dublin	Team competition
Gold medal – first place	2011 Gladbach	Team competition
Champions Trophy
Gold medal – first place	2004 Rosario	Team competition
Gold medal – first place	2005 Canberra	Team competition
Gold medal – first place	2007 Quilmes	Team competition
Bronze medal – third place	2012 Rosario	Team competition
- Updated on 30 July 2012

Maartje Goderie (born 5 April 1984, Den Bosch) is a Dutch field hockey player, who plays as forward for Dutch club HC Den Bosch. She also plays for the Netherlands national team and she was part of the Dutch squad that became World Champion at the 2006 Women's Hockey World Cup and which won the 2007 Champions Trophy.

At the 2008 Summer Olympics in Beijing she won an Olympic gold medal with the Dutch national team beating China in the final 2–0. In the final Goderie scored the second goal. At the 2012 Summer Olympics, she won a second gold.

Awards
Preceded by (Argentina) Agustina García	WorldHockey Young Player of the Year; 2005	Succeeded by (South Korea) Park Mi-hyun
