= Pakistan Hockey League =

Professional field hockey league in Pakistan

- Sport: Field hockey
- Founded: 2026; 0 years ago
- First season: 2027
- Administrator: Pakistan Hockey Federation
- No. of teams: 6 (proposed)
- Country: Pakistan
- 2027 Pakistan Hockey League

The Pakistan Hockey League, abbreviated PHL, is a planned professional field hockey league in Pakistan, organised by the Pakistan Hockey Federation. The competition was publicly launched at a ceremony in Islamabad on 14 October 2026, with its inaugural season planned for March 2027 in Lahore.

The PHL is the second franchise hockey league in Pakistan, after the Pakistan Super Hockey League held in 2005.

== History ==
=== Domestic hockey and the 2005 Super Hockey League ===
Pakistan's domestic hockey system has traditionally included regional and departmental competitions, most notably the National Hockey Championship, which was first played in 1948. The national men's hockey team won three Olympic gold medals and four World Cup titles in the 20th century, but its subsequent decline prompted repeated calls for changes to the country's domestic hockey structure.

In September 2005, the PHF staged the Pakistan Super Hockey League at the Hockey Club of Pakistan in Karachi under president Tariq Kirmani. The tournament involved six regional teams and also featured Indian players, including Dilip Tirkey, Gagan Ajit Singh and Adrian D'Souza. The Sindh Qalandars won the competition, beating Northern Cavaliers 4–3 in the final on 18 September. Although the PHF subsequently discussed making an international version of the competition an annual event, the 2005 tournament did not develop into a continuing franchise league.

=== Proposals and postponements, 2016–2022 ===
In February 2016, PHF secretary and former Pakistan captain Shahbaz Ahmed announced preparations for a professional hockey league, initially targeted for November that year. The proposed league was expected to consist of city-based franchises and was compared with cricket's Pakistan Super League. The 2016 launch was postponed when the PHF failed to secure a required no-objection certificate from the Punjab government. The league was expected to include six franchises, with matches primarily in Lahore, Faisalabad and Gojra and overseas players. A possible April 2017 opening was subsequently discussed. In November 2017, the PHF reported that it had received permission from Pakistan's Interior Ministry to hold the league, then scheduled for April 2018. The start was later considered for July because of the Pakistan team's participation in the 2018 Commonwealth Games and the timing of Ramadan.

Later plans emerged in 2018 for a six-team tournament scheduled for February 2019 in Lahore, with foreign players expected from several European countries and Argentina. Proposed team names included Karachi Kararay, Lahori Ustad, Peshawar Dilawar, Multan Sufiyan, Islamabad Commander and Quetta Defender. Financial difficulties forced another postponement, with March 2019 suggested as a replacement window. The competition again failed to take place. In July 2019, PHF secretary Asif Bajwa identified reviving the planned hockey league as a priority and suggested another attempt in 2020.

In June 2022, under PHF president Khalid Sajjad Khokhar, another proposed franchise competition was announced under the name The Max, also named as the Pakistan Premier Hockey League. The league was expected to include five city-based teams representing Karachi, Lahore, Quetta, Peshawar and Islamabad. Although the project was announced publicly, its intended inaugural edition failed to take place.

=== 2026–present ===
In March 2026, a newly announced PHF reform agenda included a proposed PTCL National Hockey League supported by a three-year partnership with Pakistan Telecommunication Company Limited.

By August 2026, the PHF announced plans for a league targeted for the first quarter of 2027. On 30 September 2026, the PHF announced that the league's commercial rights had been awarded to MediaCast following a bidding process earlier in the year. The federation stated that the PHL would seek to incorporate aspects of the Men's FIH Pro League and the Hockey India League into a six to eight teams franchise-based domestic competition, with overseas players expected to play.

The PHL held a soft-launch ceremony in Islamabad on 14 October 2026. The league's first playing season is planned for March 2027 for a six-team competition to be staged in Lahore.

== Format ==
Lahore is the intended host city for the inaugural season. The match schedule and final competition format are yet to be announced.

== Teams ==
Team	City	Debut
TBA	TBA	2027
TBA	TBA	2027
TBA	TBA	2027
TBA	TBA	2027
TBA	TBA	2027
TBA	TBA	2027

== See also ==
- Pakistan Super Hockey League
- National Hockey Championship (Pakistan)
- Field hockey in Pakistan
