= Pakistan Super Hockey League =

Field hockey tournament in Pakistan

- Sport: Field hockey
- Founded: 2005
- Folded: 2005
- Administrator: Pakistan Hockey Federation
- No. of teams: 6
- Country: Pakistan
- Headquarters: Lahore, Punjab, Pakistan
- Confederation: AHF (Asia)
- Last champion: Sindh Qalandars (1)
- Level on pyramid: Level 1
- Tournament format: Double Round-robin and Playoffs

The Pakistan Super Hockey League was a franchise-based field hockey tournament in Pakistan held in 2005. It was organized by the Pakistan Hockey Federation.

== Overview ==
A franchise-based hockey league in Pakistan was proposed during the tenure of Pakistan Hockey Federation president Tariq Kirmani in 2005. The six teams represented Pakistan’s provinces and administrative regions. Sindh Qalandars represented Sindh, Shan-e-Punjab represented Punjab, Frontier Falcons represented the North-West Frontier Province, Baloch Lions represented Balochistan, Northern Cavaliers represented the Northern Areas, and Capital Dynamos represented the Islamabad Capital Territory. Individual teams received corporate sponsorship: Sui Southern Gas Company sponsored Sindh Qalandars, MCB Bank sponsored Shan-e-Punjab, and Saudi Pak Commercial Bank sponsored Northern Cavaliers.

There would be 18 matches in all, 15 to be played on single league basis and three classification matches. The tournament featured six teams competing in a single round-robin league stage, with each team playing every other team once. The top two teams advanced to the final, while the third and fourth placed teams contested the bronze medal match and the fifth and sixth placed teams played a fifth-place play-off.

== Teams ==
Six teams were named to play in the tournament. Players were selected from different regional and departmental teams of the National Hockey Championship. Six Indian players also participated in the tournament including Dilip Tirkey, Adrian D'Souza, Gagan Ajit Singh, Sandeep Singh, Viren Rasquinha and Arjun Halappa.

=== Sindh Qalandars ===
Ahmed Alam (PIA, captain), Dilip Tirkey (India), Tariq Yameen (HBL), Gohar Rasool (Wapda), Atif Mushtaq (Customs), Asim Khan (NBP), Adnan Zakir (NBP), Kashif Jawed (HBL), Muhammad Zubair (PTCL), Muhammad Shahbir (Wapda), Rashid (Pak Army), M. Khaliq (HBL), Mazhar (Customs), Zeeshan (PAF), Ranan Fayyaz (PIA), Mukhtar Hussain (PIA), Rashid (KESC), Sameer Hussain (HBL), Ishtiaq Mubin (SSGC), Wasif Raza (SSGC)

Officials: Akhtar-ul-Islam (Manager), Nasir Ali (Coach), Weseem Feroz (Assiatant Coach), Mansoor Ahmed (Goal-keeper trainer)

=== Shan-e-Punjab ===
Salman Akbar (PTCL), Tariq Imran (PTCL), Sandeep Singh (India), Ghazanfar Ali (PTCL), Muhammad Saqlain (ABL, captain), Waqas Sharif (Wapda), Arshad Mustensar Sheikh (Customs), Tariq Aziz (NBP), Shafqat Rasool (Customs), Waqas Liaqat (NBP), M. Shahid (Police), Shahzad Ahmed (Customs), Anayat Ullah (PTCL), Muhammad Shahbaz (Police), Adnan Mushtaq, M. Ashraf (Punjab), Riaz (Punjab).

Officials: Manzoor Junior (Manager), Naveed Alam (Coach), Saleem Sherwani (Assistant Coach), M. Tariq (Goal-keeping coach)

=== Frontier Falcons ===
M. Iqbal (PIA), Ikhalq Jr (PIA), Ehsanullah (Customs), Sumair Saleem (NBP), Shahid Waseem (Police), Aamir Shahzad (Pak Steel) Muhammad Arif (PTCL), Yasir Islam (PIA), M. Farooq (PIA), Rahim Khan (PIA), Naveed Iqbal (Wapda), Farhan (Punjab), Kashif Ali (Pak Steel), Pizwan-ul-Haq (PTCL), Amar Ishrat (NBP), Saeed Shah (PAF), Naeem Akbar (NBP), Viren Rasquinha (India), Rana Sajjad (Wapda), Abbas (KESC).

Officials: Farhat Khan (Manager), Qamar Ibrahim (Coach), Qasim Khan (Assistant Coach), Rauf (Goal-keeper Coach)

=== Baloch Lions ===
Adrian D'Souza (India), Zeeshan Ashraf (NBP), Imran Warsi (NBP), Imran Khan (PIA), Rana Asif (Wapda), Sajjad Anwar (PTCL), Zakirullah (Wapda), Shakeel Abbasi (PTCL), Shabbir Hussain (SSGC), Muhammad Sarwar (ABL, captain), Saleem (Army), Imran Shah (Customs), Adnan Hamid (NBP), Irfan (PTCL), Abu Baker (PIA), Adif Bilal (Wapda), Mudassar Ali (Wapda), Khurram Butt (Wapda), Waqas Hasib (Attock).

Officials: Rasheed Baloch (Manager), Danish Kaleem (Coach), Muhammad Farooq Khan (Assistant Coach), G. Jillani (Goal-keeper Coach)

=== Northern Cavaliers ===
Nasim Ahmed (PIA), M. Imran (Army), Amin Saleem (PIA), Sultan Ashraf (Wapda), Khalid Mahmood (HBL), Dilawar (Army), Rehan Butt (Wapda), Saleem Khalid (PTCL), Mahmood Ali (PIA), Muhammad Nadeem (NBP, captain), Akhtar Ali (NBP), Shakir Muneer (Wapda), Arjun Halappa (India), Fayaz Ahmed (ABL), Ishtiaq Ahmad (Pak Steel), Kashif Yaqoob (PAF), Mudassar Abbas (SSGC), Rauf (Pak Steel), Yasin Dilawar (Customs).

Officials: Ashraf Awan (Manager), Rana Zaheer (Coach), Safdar Abbas (Assistant Coach), Arshad Hussain (Goal-keeper coach)

=== Capital Dynamos ===
Amanullah (Wapda), Ateeq-ur-Rehman (PTCL), Ali Raza (PIA), M.Usman (PIA), Adnan Maqsood (NBP), Inam-ur-Rehman (PIA), Owais Khan Shani (NBP), Mudassar Ali Khan (Wapda, captain), Gagan Ajit Singh (India), Naeem Akram (Wapda), Asghar (Army), Tariq Mahood (Police), Muhammad Sami (SSGC), Shahid Rabbani (Wapda), Rizwan Butt (Wapda), Razzaq (Wapda), Ghulam Murtaza (Wapda), Waqas Akbar (Pak Steel), Rana Javaid (Wapda).

Officials: Pervaiz Kiyani (Manager), Tauqeer Dar (Coach), Ghulam Ghaus (Assistant Coach), Ikhlaq Usmani (goal-keeper coach)

== Schedule ==
=== League stage ===
Team	Pld	W	D	L	GF	GA	GD	Pts
Sindh Qalandars	5	3	0	2	14	10	+4	9
Northern Cavaliers	5	3	0	2	13	12	+1	9
Baloch Lions	5	3	0	2	12	11	+1	9
Shan-e-Punjab	5	3	0	2	16	17	–1	9
Capital Dynamos	5	2	0	3	16	16	0	6
Frontier Falcons	5	1	0	4	8	13	–5	6

8 September 2005

Baloch Lions	3–2	Sindh Qalandars
	Report

Hockey Club of Pakistan, Karachi

8 September 2005

Shan-e-Punjab	4–1	Frontier Falcons
	Report

Hockey Club of Pakistan, Karachi

9 September 2005

Capital Dynamos	1–2	Northern Cavaliers

Hockey Club of Pakistan, Karachi

9 September 2005

Baloch Lions	2–1	Frontier Falcons
	Report

Hockey Club of Pakistan, Karachi

10 September 2005

Sindh Qalandars	3–2	Capital Dynamos
	Report

Hockey Club of Pakistan, Karachi

10 September 2005

Shan-e-Punjab	5–4	Northern Cavaliers
	Report

Hockey Club of Pakistan, Karachi

11 September 2005

Shan-e-Punjab	3–2	Baloch Lions
	Report

Hockey Club of Pakistan, Karachi

11 September 2005

Sindh Qalandars	3–1	Frontier Falcons
	Report

Hockey Club of Pakistan, Karachi

12 September 2005

Capital Dynamos	4–2	Baloch Lions
	Report

Hockey Club of Pakistan, Karachi

12 September 2005

Northern Cavaliers	2–0	Frontier Falcons
	Report

Hockey Club of Pakistan, Karachi

13 September 2005

Capital Dynamos	7–4	Shan-e-Punjab
	Report

Hockey Club of Pakistan, Karachi

13 September 2005

Northern Cavaliers	4–3	Sindh Qalandars
	Report

Hockey Club of Pakistan, Karachi

14 September 2005

Sindh Qalandars	3–0	Shan-e-Punjab
	Report

Hockey Club of Pakistan, Karachi

15 September 2005

Frontier Falcons	5–2	Capital Dynamos
	Report

Hockey Club of Pakistan, Karachi

15 September 2005

Baloch Lions	3–1	Northern Cavaliers
	Report

Hockey Club of Pakistan, Karachi

=== Play-offs ===
==== Fifth and sixth place ====
17 September 2005

Capital Dynamos	7–1	Frontier Falcons
	Report

Hockey Club of Pakistan, Karachi

==== Third and fourth place ====
17 September 2005

Baloch Lions	0–3	Shan-e-Punjab
	Report

Hockey Club of Pakistan, Karachi

==== Final ====
18 September 2005

Sindh Qalandars	4–3	Northern Cavaliers
	Report

Hockey Club of Pakistan, Karachi

== Awards ==
Best Player	Second Best Player	Third Best Player	Best Goalkeeper	Second Best Goalkeeper	Third Best Goalkeeper
Shabbir Hussain (Sindh Qalandars)	Ehsanullah (Frontier Falcons)	Shabbir Ahmad (Sindh Qalandars)	Ahmed Alam (Sindh Qalandars)	Adrian D'Souza (Baloch Lions)	Nasir (Northern Cavaliers)

== See also ==
- Pakistan Hockey League
