= Sheikh Sadruddin =

Afghan founder of Malerkotla State in Hindustan (15th century)

Sadruddin-i-Jahan
- Sheikh
- Born: 1434
- Died: 1515 (aged 81)
- Burial: Baba Haidar Sheikh Dargah in Malerkotla
- Spouse: Taj Murassa, Bhatiyaniji Murtaza Begum
- Issue: Bibi Mangi; Hassan Muhammad; Muhammad Isa; Muhammad Musa
Names
- Sheikh Sadruddin Sadar-i-Jahan, Baba Haidar Sheikh
- House: Sherwani
- Father: Sheikh Ahmed Zinda Pir
- Religion: Sunni Islam

Sheikh Sadruddin was a Sufi mystic and chief of the jagir of Maler and an ancestor of the rulers of the Malerkotla State. He received the area of Maler as jagir from Bahlul Lodi after marrying his daughter Taj Murassa in 1454. He belonged to Sherwani tribe of Afghanistan.

== Early life ==
Sheikh Sadruddin was the son of Sheikh Ahmed Zinda Pir and grandson of Sheikh Ali Shahbaz Khan. He was spiritually inclined from childhood as he came from a long line of Sufi mystics (known as pirs). In 1449, he settled in Punjab region at the bank of the Sutlej river (Bhumsi) to engage in religious activities.

== Marriage ==
In 1451 one night, Bahlul Khan Lodi camped at Maler on his way to conquer Delhi. It was a stormy night and the only lamp aflame was in the hut on the mound. Bahlul went to meet the man whose lamp the harsh winds could not extinguish. Sheikh Sadruddin welcomed Bahlul into his hut and prophesied that Delhi would indeed be his. When Bahlul accomplished his mission (after conquering Delhi) the Sultan returned and in 1454 married his daughter Taj Murassa Begum to Sheikh Sadruddin, and gave her a number of villages in the region as a marriage portion. The Sheikh and his Afghan wife had two children–a daughter, Bibi Mangi, and a son, Sheikh Hassan Muhammad.

== Career ==
He sometimes served as Sardar-i-Jahan (Chief Judicial Officer) during the reign of Bahlul Lodi.

== Death ==
The Sheikh died in 1515 C.E. He was buried at the same place where he always used to pray. Other family members of the family were also buried near the Mazaar of Sheikh Sadr-ud-Din. According to a history written by Iftikhar Ali Khan, the last Nawab of the Malerkotla State; Bayazid Khan (Six Generation of Baba Hazrat Sheikh) was responsible for the building of the tomb shrine, Baba Hazrat Sheikh Dargah in Malerkotla.
