= Falound Kalan =

- village
- Location in Punjab, India
- Coordinates: 30.595864°N 75.896344°E
- Country: India
- State: Punjab
- District: Sangrur

Languages
  - Official: Punjabi
  - Regional: Punjabi
- Time zone: UTC+5:30 (IST)
- PIN: 148019
- Telephone code: 01675-273382
- Nearest city: Malerkotla

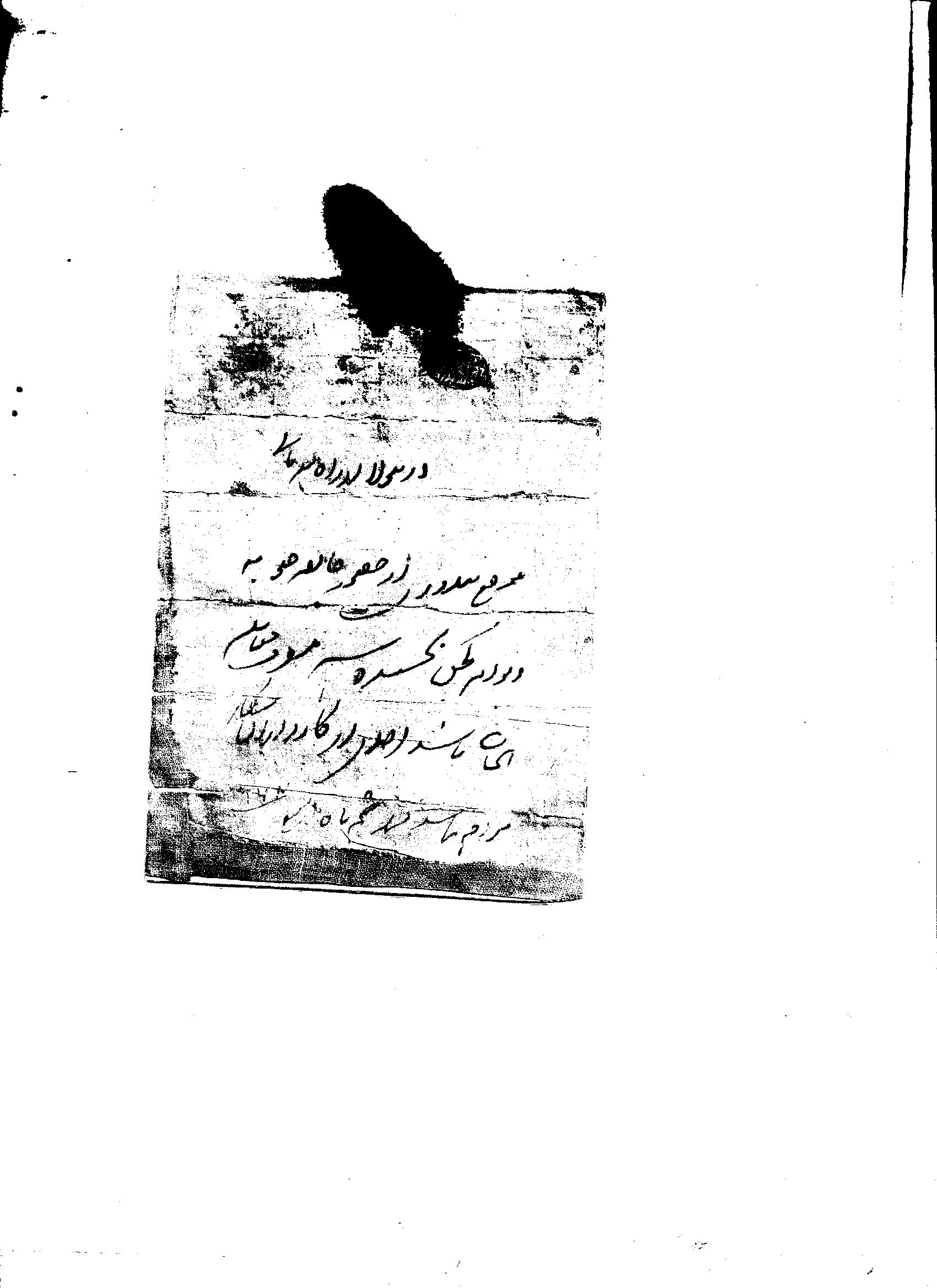
This land donation certificate was given by The Nawab of Raikot to Baba Gajjan Shah ji

Falaund Kalan is a village in Sangrur in Punjab, India.

== History ==
The village name came from the foundries that were used to melt iron (folad) for the state of Malerkotla. A large mound near the Chupka village in the administrative land of Falaund Khurd offers evidence of that. The area was once called Banger, as its dialect was different from central Punjab.

Ahmed Shah Abdali fought a historical war with Sikhs at nearby Rohira in which more than twenty-thousand men were killed and a large number were injured. This battle was significant in the history of Malerkotla Rayiast.

During the Partition of India in 1947, those men who had crossed the boundary into Falaund Kalan were not harmed. The Nawab of Malerkotla, Sher Khan opposed the killing of the younger sons of the 10th master Sri Guru Gobind Singh at Sirhind. This is known as Ha Da Nahra ("Voice against oppression.") The Sikhs felt that Sri Guru Gobind Singh had pardoned the Nawab. In lieu of this, Malerkotla was not displaced. Many people and animals entered the city for protection during Partition.

In 2015, Mr. Bal Anand, IFS, from Falaund Kalan, instituted a prize consisting of Rs 11,000 and a citation for a renowned author in the memory of his grandfather Baba Paramatma Nand, an Ayurveda wizard who had written the life history of Baba Gajjan Shah.

== Location ==
Falound Kalan is located on the Ludhiana-Malerkotla Road four kilometers away from Rohira.

== Lohri festival ==
In 1884 Samat started the Lohri festival celebration, where the Sadhus used to assemble in large numbers. The scholars of Sanskrit who had contributed to Ayurvedic medicine were honored by Baba Ji. This tradition was made compulsory by Baba Ji followers known as Mahant.

The rural sports organized by Young Farmers Club was started in 1951 by Master Ram Swarup. The events of kabaddi, football, volleyball, wrestling and tug-of-war are included. Local artists sing religious and historical songs.

== Villagers ==
A majority of the villagers served in the Indian Army. The village's population is educated and produced administrators such as Shri Bachitter Singh I.R.S .(retired), Shri Jagtar Singh P.C.S., and various educators and men ranging from Indian Foreign Services to the Indian Postal department.

Some younger inhabitants emigrated to the United States, Canada, Australia, New Zealand, Europe and the Gulf nations. Many return to their native village for the Lohri festival where they pay homage to the forefathers and fulfill the vow, "The person who visits Falound for three days together on Lohri will go to Heaven." This legacy was ordained by Guru Gajjan Shah.
