= Abaspura =

- Village
- Location within Punjab Location within India
- Coordinates: 30°31′12″N 75°54′15″E
- Country: India
- State: Punjab
- District: Sangrur

Languages
  - Official: Punjabi
- Time zone: UTC+5:30 (IST)

Abaspura is a village in the Malerkotla district of Punjab, India. Formerly a part of the Sangrur district, it is located in the Malerkotla tehsil.

== Geography ==
Abaspura is located at the eastern boundary of Malerkotla city. Nearby villages are Hathoa, Haider Nagar, Binjoki Khurd and Binjoki Kalan.

== Transportation ==
The nearest railway station (Malerkotla) is 3.5 km away.
