= Saleem Sherwani =

Saleem Sherwani may refer to:

- Saleem Sherwani (field hockey forward), Pakistan field hockey player who played in 1984 Summer Olympics
- Saleem Sherwani (field hockey goalkeeper), Pakistani field hockey goal keeper who participated in 1972 Summer Olympics

== See also ==
- Sherwani (surname)
