= Pakistan Customs field hockey team =

Pakistani departmental field hockey team

Pakistan Customs
- Full name: Pakistan Customs field hockey team
- Short name: Customs
- League: National Hockey Championship

Affiliation
- Institution: Pakistan Customs

The Pakistan Customs field hockey team is a Pakistani departmental field hockey team representing Pakistan Customs. It competes in the National Hockey Championship, the country's premier domestic field hockey competition. With nine national championship titles, it is the second-most successful team in the competition, behind Pakistan International Airlines.

== History ==
=== Early history ===
The origins of Pakistan Customs' hockey activities date to the years surrounding the Partition of India in 1947. Several Muslim hockey players employed by the customs authorities of British India migrated to Pakistan and continued their employment with the newly established customs administration in Karachi.

In 1955, the department recruited a new generation of players, including Habib Ali Kiddie, Anwar Ahmed Khan, Qazi Musarrat Hussain and Jamshed Hamid. That year, Customs won the inaugural Quaid-e-Azam Gold Cup Hockey Tournament in Karachi, defeating Afghan Club in a competition attended by Fatima Jinnah.

The department also developed multiple hockey sides. In 1957, Central Excise and Land Customs established its own team, following the example of Sea Customs.

=== National championship success ===
During the 1960s, Customs emerged as one of Pakistan's leading departmental hockey teams. Alongside Pakistan International Airlines, it attracted prominent players through permanent employment and financial support, challenging the earlier dominance of regional selections and teams representing the armed forces, police and railways.

Customs won its first National Hockey Championship in 1969, followed by consecutive titles in 1970 and 1971. The team added a fourth championship in 1973. The department was prominent during Pakistan's international success in the 1970s and 1980s.

Customs had another successful period during the 1980s, winning the National Hockey Championship in 1984, sharing the 1985 title with PIA, and winning further championships in 1986 and 1988.

=== Decline ===
Customs' hockey programme experienced difficulties caused by restrictions on recruitment, diminishing financial support and the decline of departmental sports in the 2000s. The department reportedly had not recruited new hockey players since 1986.

In 2015, Customs began an attempt to strengthen its senior team. A 24-member squad was assembled ahead of the 62nd National Hockey Championship in Karachi.

Customs also competed in the 64th National Hockey Championship held in Sukkur in December 2017. It drew 1–1 with Pakistan Army in its opening match and later lost 4–3 to defending champions PIA. The team advanced to the Super-10 stage, where it was defeated 4–1 by the National Bank of Pakistan.

Despite these attempts, the department was unable to regain its former position in senior national hockey.

=== Revival in 2023 ===
In June 2023, Pakistan Customs announced the reorganisation of its hockey team, recruiting 16 young players as part of a renewed departmental sports initiative. Eight of the recruits had represented Pakistan at the 2023 Men's Junior AHF Cup. The players were initially employed on contracts, with the possibility of permanent appointments based on their performances. The initiative was largely driven by former Customs player and Olympic gold medallist Tauqeer Dar. Dar persuaded senior Customs officials to place responsibility for the revived team under the Enforcement Collectorate in Lahore, rather than the Karachi office that had historically administered the side.

The revamped Customs side finished third at the 67th National Hockey Championship in Rawalpindi in October 2023. Following the team's third-place finish, Customs established a committee to oversee its hockey activities and consider permanent employment for its players.

Customs won the 37th National Junior Hockey Championship in October 2024, defeating Pakistan Navy in the final.

On 8 January 2025, Customs won its ninth senior National Hockey Championship title, defeating defending champions Mari Petroleum in the final of the 68th National Hockey Championship at the Abdul Sattar Edhi Hockey Stadium in Karachi. The victory marked Customs' first senior national title since 1988.

In April 2026, Customs won the National Under-18 Hockey Championship, defeating Punjab by 3–1 in the final.

== Sports facilities ==
Pakistan Customs historically operated its hockey activities from Karachi, where the Customs Enforcement Collectorate was responsible for the team's administration, recruitment and participation in competitions.

The department developed the Customs Preventive Service Club and Sports Complex in the Federal B Area of Karachi, including a synthetic-turf hockey ground. The hockey facility was inaugurated in 1992 with the staging of the third Quaid-e-Azam Gold Cup Hockey Tournament. By 2020, however, sporting activities at the complex had declined.

In June 2024, the Customs Enforcement Collectorate inaugurated six sports academies at the complex, including a hockey academy, as part of an initiative to restore sporting activities.

== Honours ==
=== Senior ===
- National Hockey Championship (Pakistan)
  - Winners (9): 1969, 1970, 1971, 1973, 1984, 1985, 1986, 1988, 2025
  - Third place: 2023
- Quaid-e-Azam Gold Cup
  - Winners: 1955

=== Junior ===
- National Junior Hockey Championship
  - Winners: 2024
  - Runners-up: 2019
- National Under-18 Hockey Championship
  - Winners: 2026

== Notable players ==
- Anwar Ahmed Khan
- Habib Ali Kiddie
- Abdul Waheed Khan
- Khalid Mahmood
- Jahangir Butt
- Tanvir Dar
- Islahuddin Siddiqui
- Samiullah Khan
- Hanif Khan
- Hasan Sardar
- Kaleemullah Khan
- Tauqir Dar
- Mansoor Ahmed
- Khawaja Junaid
- Wasim Feroz
- Muhammad Danish Kaleem

== See also ==
- Pakistan Customs FC
- Pakistan Customs cricket team
