= Amir Ali Khan =

- Reign: 1821-1846
- Predecessor: Muhammad Wazir Ali Khan
- Successor: Mahbub Ali Khan
- Born: 9 April 1799
- Died: 8 April 1846 (aged 46)
- Issue: Mahbub Ali Khan
- House: House of Sherwan
- Father: Muhammad Wazir Ali Khan
- Religion: Sunni Islam

Amir Ali Khan Bahadur was the Nawab of the Malerkotla State from 1821 to 1846.
