= Departmental sports in Pakistan =

Pakistani workplace teams competing in national sports

Departmental sports in Pakistan refers to the practice of state-owned enterprises, public bodies, the armed forces and corporations employing athletes and fielding teams that compete in domestic competitions (see works team). These entities, commonly called departments, have fielded teams across cricket, football, hockey and numerous domestic disciplines since the early decades after independence. The model has played a central role in Pakistan's domestic sport structure.

In Pakistan's usage, a department is a government ministry or agency, a state-owned enterprise, such as WAPDA, Railways, PIA, or one of the armed services (Army, Navy, Air Force). Each has historically maintained sports wings that recruit athletes as employees in various non-playing roles, and field teams in national competitions.

== History ==
=== Early origins (late 1940s–1971) ===
The roots of departmental sport in Pakistan lie in the early post-independence period. In the first decades after 1947, domestic competition in several sports was dominated by departmental teams from the Pakistan Armed Forces and Pakistan Railways, alongside provincial selections. As Pakistan national hockey team achieved international success around 1960, other public bodies such as Pakistan Customs, Pakistan International Airlines or Karachi Port Trust, followed with their own teams, leading other public bodies to establish teams beyond the military.

=== Consolidation and peak (1970s–1990s) ===
During Zulfikar Ali Bhutto's tenure (1971–77), the federal government formalised sports employment in public bodies. An ordinance made it mandatory for government departments to maintain sports wings and provide permanent jobs to sportspersons. By the 1970s the departmental pathway had become the primary route into elite sport. PIA's Colts scheme under Chairman Air Marshal Nur Khan identified and funded young talent across several sports. In individual sports. PIA's sports division supported squash, employing Jahangir Khan.

In hockey, departmental teams such as PIA and Pakistan Customs dominated the National Hockey Championship for decades. In football, from 1971 until the 1990s, PIA dominated the National Football Championship with nine titles.

=== Decline, bans and reversals (1999–present) ===
In 1999, Pakistan Cricket Board chairman Tauqir Zia, announced that departmental cricket would end, and departments were excluded from the Quaid-e-Azam Trophy in 2003 before being reinstated a few years later.

By the early 2000s, the decline of departmental sports had begun. A government ban on athlete recruitment into departments, formally lifted by Prime Minister Zafarullah Khan Jamali on 6 February 2003 but never effectively implemented, left many departmental sports wings inactive. Several major organisations including United Bank Limited, MCB Bank, Pakistan Automobile Corporation, Allied Bank Limited, Pakistan Public Works Department, among others, disbanded their sports teams, while others such as Habib Bank, National Bank, PIA, Pakistan Customs, KESC and Karachi Port Trust reduced recruitment of athletes.

In 2014, a Pakistan Cricket Board proposal sought to abolish departmental teams and replace them with a regional model, where departments would act as sponsors rather than field their own sides. In 2019, the Pakistan Cricket Board new constitution formalised a six-association structure that excluded departments from first-class cricket. Notable teams such as Habib Bank disbanded its cricket team in April 2019 after 43 years. Departmental teams in football also started declining and disbanding their teams, such as Habib Bank in 2015, or K-Electric and Pakistan Steel in 2020.

In September 2021, the federal government under Prime Minister Imran Khan directed departments to stop funding their sports wings and divert support to regional bodies, effectively freezing many programmes beyond cricket. On 25 August 2022, Prime Minister Shehbaz Sharif formally lifted the ban and ordered the restoration of departmental sports across disciplines. Following changes in PCB governance in late 2022, departments were invited back into domestic cricket. The 2023–24 President's Trophy returned, a first-class competition restricted to departments.

However by late 2024, despite government directives, there had been little practical progress, with several departments failing to re-establish teams in football and hockey. In July 2025, the Pakistan Cricket Board announced a three-tier departmental system across formats for the 2025–26 season. At the same time, government meetings and media briefings in 2025 indicated a broader push to restore departmental teams and employment across sports.

== By sport ==
=== Cricket ===
For most of Pakistan's domestic cricket history, departments fielded teams in first-class and List-A competitions. Major sides included Habib Bank Limited, United Bank Limited, National Bank of Pakistan, WAPDA, and Sui Northern Gas Pipelines Limited, all of whom won national titles and supplied internationals. Even after restructuring debates, departments continued to field teams until their exclusion in 2019, and since its restoration in 2023, competitions such as the President's Trophy have once again featured departmental return.

=== Football ===
Football in Pakistan has long been dominated by departmental teams. At the National Football Championship, which was the men's highest level football competition from 1948 to 2003, Karachi-based Pakistan Airlines won the competition nine times. After the introduction of the Pakistan Premier League in 2004, departmental teams continued to dominate the domestic competitions through KRL and WAPDA.

=== Hockey ===
Departmental teams have frequently won the National Hockey Championship titles. PIA has the record number of 29 national titles, followed by Pakistan Customs. WAPDA and National Bank have also been recurring finalists and champions across the 2000s–2010s.

=== Other sports ===
Departmental employment has also been implemented in individual sports. Squash player Jahangir Khan was employed by PIA. In athletics, Pakistan's Olympic gold medallist and javelin thrower Arshad Nadeem has been employed by WAPDA.

== Criticism ==
According to supporters of the system, departmental sports provided athletes with livelihoods at a time when professional opportunities in Pakistan were limited. Departments offered regular salaries, medical benefits, and training facilities over several decades.

Other commentators have argued that departmental dominance limited the growth of community-based clubs, led to low spectator interest, and discouraged the development of commercially sustainable teams. The closure of departmental sports in 2021 exposed the departmental system reliance on government policy decisions, with many athletes losing their jobs.

== See also ==
- Voluntary Sports Societies of the Soviet Union
- Works team
- Sport in Pakistan
