= Pakistan International Airlines field hockey team =

Pakistani departmental field hockey team

Pakistan International Airlines
- Full name: Pakistan International Airlines field hockey team
- Short name: PIA
- Dissolved: 2021; 5 years ago

Personnel
- Owner: Pakistan International Airlines

The Pakistan International Airlines field hockey team, commonly known as PIA, was a Pakistani departmental field hockey team operated by Pakistan International Airlines. Historically one of the leading teams in Pakistani domestic hockey, it competed in the National Hockey Championship, winning the championship 29 times, making it the most successful Pakistani domestic field hockey team.

== History ==
=== Establishment and early development ===
PIA's involvement in field hockey developed alongside the growth of departmental sports in Pakistan during the 1950s and 1960s. The airline established its sports division in 1958 and introduced a programme to provide employment and training opportunities for athletes.

Under the leadership of Air Marshal Nur Khan, PIA established a notable hockey side by recruiting players from hockey centres in central Punjab. Among the earliest prominent recruits was Asad Malik, who had previously represented the Lahore zone and went on to become captain of Pakistan at the 1972 Summer Olympics.

Before the emergence of PIA in domestic hockey, the domestic competitions were previously dominated by regional selections and teams representing the armed forces, police and railways. Alongside Pakistan Customs, PIA became one of the principal employers of leading Pakistani hockey players. Both departments played a major role in supplying players to the national team during its most successful period.

=== Domestic dominance (1960s–2010s) ===
PIA became dominant in the National Hockey Championship, establishing a rivalry with Pakistan Customs. The two departments frequently recruited established international players by offering permanent employment and other financial benefits.

After his retirement as a player, Asad Malik joined the PIA sports administration and managed the hockey team for an extended period. Malik guided PIA to 13 national championship titles as well as several junior national titles. He later retired from the airline as general manager of sports.

In addition to its senior side, PIA maintained a junior hockey programme, including a PIA Colts team, which frequently competed in the National Junior Hockey Championship.

=== Decline and inactivity ===
Following its run of three consecutive national titles until 2016, PIA's results deteriorated. At the 65th National Hockey Championship in Karachi in 2019, the team was eliminated in the quarter-finals after losing 3–2 to WAPDA.

Financial difficulties at the airline subsequently affected its departmental sports operations. PIA did not participate in the 2020 National Hockey Championship. In 2021, several prominent players were leaving the airline under its voluntary separation scheme. PIA's sports teams had not formally been disbanded, but had stopped participating in major domestic competitions and were no longer recruiting new players.

The club was closed after the shutdown of departmental sports in Pakistan in September 2021.

== Honours ==
- National Hockey Championship
  - Winners: 1964, 1966, 1967, 1972, 1973, 1975, 1976, 1977, 1979, 1980, 1982, 1983, 1985, 1987, 1989, 1991, 1992, 1995, 1996, 1997, 1997, 2001, 2002, 2008, 2009, 2012, 2014, 2015, 2016
- All-Pakistan Aga Khan Gold Cup
  - Winners: 2002
- Nishan-e-Haider Hockey Tournament
  - Winners: 2014.
- Brigadier Manzoor Hussain Atif Memorial Hockey Tournament
  - Winners: 2014.

== Notable players ==
- Asad Malik
- Manzoor Hussain Junior
- Shahbaz Ahmed
- Saleem Sherwani
- Kamran Ashraf
- Ahmad Alam
- Shafqat Rasool
- Muhammad Irfan
- Shahid Ali Khan

== See also ==
- National Hockey Championship (Pakistan)
- Pakistan International Airlines FC
- Pakistan International Airlines cricket team
