= Shan-e-Punjab =

Field hockey team

- Full name: Shan-e-Punjab
- League: Pakistan Super Hockey League
- Founded: 2005

Shan-e-Punjab was a field hockey team representing the Punjab province in Pakistan. It played in the Pakistan Super Hockey League. It was sponsored by MCB Bank.

The team finished third in the Pakistan Super Hockey League in 2005.

== Squad (2005) ==
Salman Akbar (PTCL), Tariq Imran (PTCL), Sandeep Singh (India), Ghazanfar Ali (PTCL), Muhammad Saqlain (ABL, captain), Waqas Sharif (Wapda), Arshad Mustensar Sheikh (Customs), Tariq Aziz (NBP), Shafqat Rasool (Customs), Waqas Liaqat (NBP), M. Shahid (Police), Shahzad Ahmed (Customs), Anayat Ullah (PTCL), Muhammad Shahbaz (Police), Adnan Mushtaq, M. Ashraf (Punjab), Riaz (Punjab).

Officials: Manzoor Junior (Manager), Naveed Alam (Coach), Saleem Sherwani (Assistant Coach), M. Tariq (Goal-keeping coach)
