= Ahmad Ali Khan of Malerkotla =

Ahmad Ali Khan
- Nawab, Sir, KCSI, KCIE
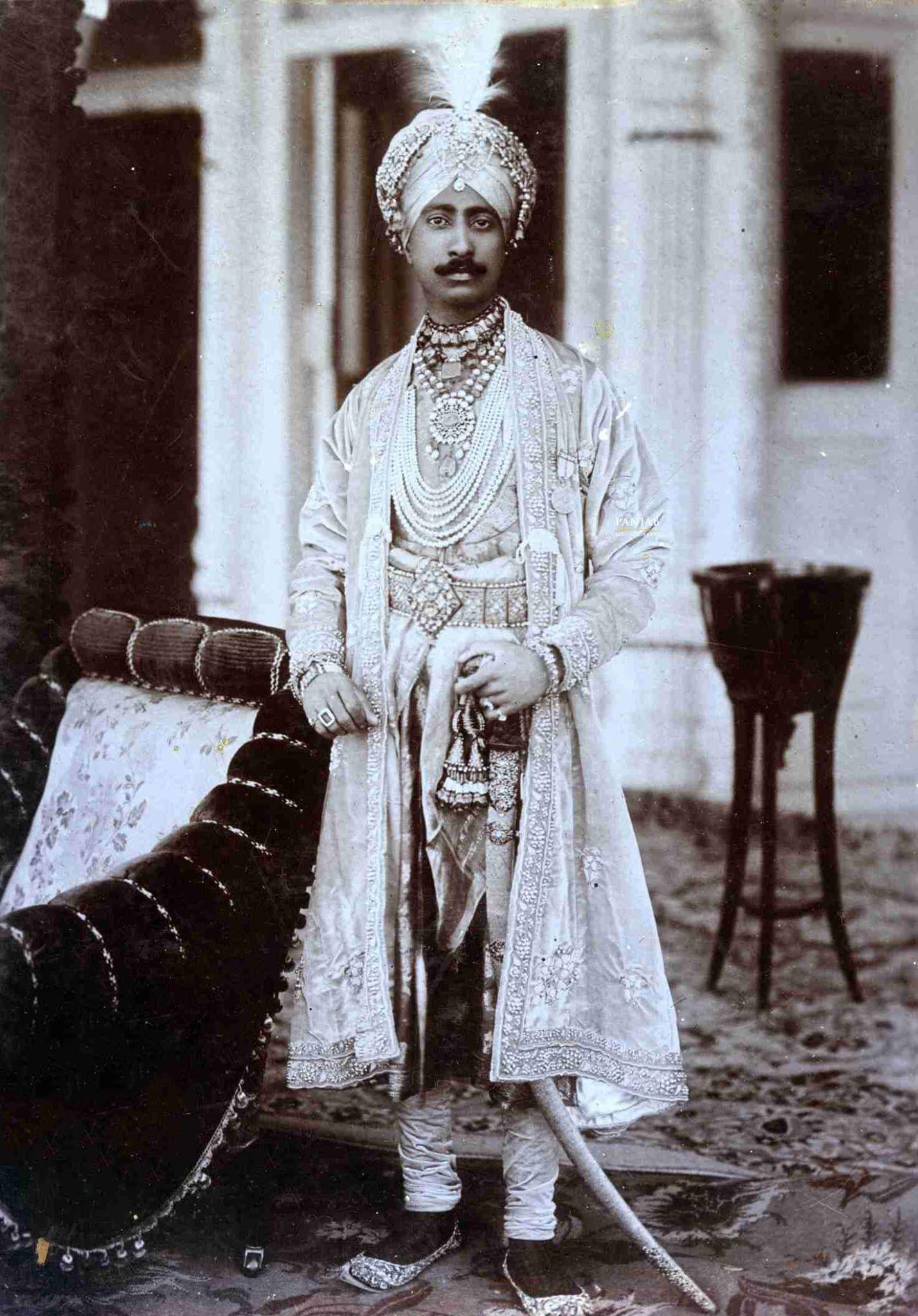
- Ahmad Ali Khan in the 1930s

Nawab of Malerkotla
- Reign: 24 September 1908 – 15 August 1947
- Predecessor: Ibrahim Ali Khan
- Successor: Iftikhar Ali Khan of Malerkotla
- Born: Muhammad Ahmad Ali; 10 September 1881; Malerkotla, Malerkotla State (present-day Punjab, India)
- Died: 16 October 1947 (aged 66); Malerkotla, Malerkotla State
- Burial: Shahi Maqbara, Malerkotla
- Begum (wives): Dulhan Begum; Mallika Zamani Begum; Murtaza Begum; Ruqaiya Begum
- Issue: 10, including Iftikhar Ali Khan of Malerkotla
- Father: Muhammad Ibrahim Ali Khan
- Mother: Fazilatunnisa Begum
- Religion: Islam

Sir Muhammad Ahmad Ali Khan KCSI KCIE (10 September 1881 – 16 October 1947) was the penultimate Nawab of Malerkotla State in India from 1908 until his death. He was the only nawab of the state who had his name inscribed on coins, and was noted for his extensive building projects. Though considered an ineffectual ruler and relatively unpopular during his lifetime, Ahmad's policies were later credited with ensuring communal peace in his small state during the widespread religious violence amid the Partition of India in 1947. As a result, public opinion of his reign greatly improved after his death.

== Early life ==
Muhammad Ahmad Ali was born at Malerkotla in 1881. He was the second son of Nawab Ibrahim Ali Khan.

== Reign ==
Ahmad Ali Khan ascended the throne in 1908 after the death of his father. His formal investiture took place in 1909. From the beginning, his rule was troubled by property disputes among his family.

Ahmad Ali Khan attempted to modernize his state and improve the living conditions of his subjects. He built a railroad, schools, hospitals, and a college. He also constructed a bazaar based on Jaipur's "pink city". These projects resulted in major debts for the Nawab, and his state. Malerkotla's administration reportedly went bankrupt soon after Ahmad's accession to the throne, and remained in this state during most of his rule. Corruption among the state's public services was also a problem. Despite his dire financial situation, Ahmad provided troops (Note: By 1915, Ahmad had a private army of 600 infantry, 54 cavalry, and 2 artillery pieces.) and money to the British government during World War I and World War II, incurring even more debts. Nevertheless, British officials generally had a low opinion of Ahmad, regarding him as easily influenced, and financially irresponsible.

Ahmad's policies did not endear him to his subjects, and contemporary records indicate that he was not a popular ruler. He was criticised by local newspapers for his excessive spending, and religious attitudes. Ahmad generally tried to keep the religious peace in his domain, but when unrest and disputes occurred, such as during two religious riots in the 1930s, he would reportedly flee to Shimla, where he could be protected by the British. Both Hindus and Muslims in Malerkotla were regularly displeased with his decisions during disputes and accused him of sectarianism, although he wanted to stay out of the debates and did not favor one community over the other. In one of the most notable cases, Malerkotla's mufti led an exodus of Muslims out of the state in protest against Ahmad's perceived pro-Hindu bias. Religious studies expert Anna Bigelow credited local community leaders more with deescalating the religious conflicts in Malerkotla than Ahmad Ali Khan. The Nawab himself suspected, probably correctly, that some of the religious conflicts during his reign were at least partially engineered by his rival and cousin Ihsan Ali Khan.

Nevertheless, Ahmad was notable insofar as he generally allowed public criticism of his rule, and attempted to keep both Muslims and Hindus somewhat satisfied. Whereas other Indian princes in the Punjab violently suppressed critics, and took part in religious pogroms, Ahmad's precarious situation as weak sovereign of a tiny state made him extremely cautious and interested in keeping communal peace.

Ahmad's court culture was marked by the presence of qawwals who introduced Urdu and Persian qawwali. These songs were written by Amir Khusrow and contained verses from various religions.

=== The Partition of India and death ===
Unlike the other parts of eastern Punjab, there was no mob violence in Malerkotla State during the Partition of India in 1947. Ahmad Ali Khan maintained an army until the independence of India. Whereas other princely states in the region used their troops to carry out ethnic and religious cleansing campaigns, Malerkotla's forces tried to keep order, while thousands of refugees took refuge in the small state. In September 1947, the Nawab signed the Instrument of Accession to join the newly created Dominion of India, and requested that the Indian central government send the Indian Army to prevent chaos in Malerkotla. At the time, the Nawab was already very sick, and his son Iftikhar Ali Khan acted as regent for most of the time. Ahmad died on 16 October 1947 and was succeeded by Iftikhar who ruled only for a few months until the monarchy of Malerkotla was abolished.

Following his death, Ahmad was idealized by his son Iftikhar as an "exemplary Indian prince" who had made possible the religious peace in Malerkotla due to his decades-long secular policies. Having witnessed the chaos and death in other states of the region, many locals in Malerkotla came to greatly improve their opinion of Ahmad, and to share Iftikhar Ali Khan's assessment of his father's rule.

== Coinage ==
Ahmad Ali Khan's full name was inscribed on the coins issued during his reign. He was the only nawab of Malerkotla to have his name inscribed on the state's coins. Previous rulers had instead inscribed the name of 18th century Afghan ruler Ahmad Shah Durrani on their coinage; this tradition stemmed from Ahmad Shah Durrani having granted Malerkotla the right to mint coins in the first place.

== Personal life ==
One contemporary British official described Ahmad Ali Khan as "charming gentleman of no character or capacity" who, along with the rest of his family, had an "exaggerated sense" of self-importance.

=== Marriages ===
Ahmad Ali Khan married four times. On 6 August 1898, he married his cousin and first wife Dulhan Begum. In 1903, he married Mallika Zamani Begum, a cousin of Nawab Raza Ali Khan of Rampur. He also married Murtaza Begum and Ruqaiya Begum. He fathered six sons and four daughters.

He had his son and successor, Iftikhar Ali Khan, educated by European tutors and governesses.
