= Malerkotla State =

Indian princely state

Coordinates: 30°32′N 75°59′E

- 1454
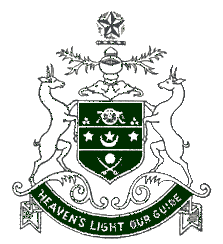
- Coat of arms
- Motto: Heaven's Light Our Guide
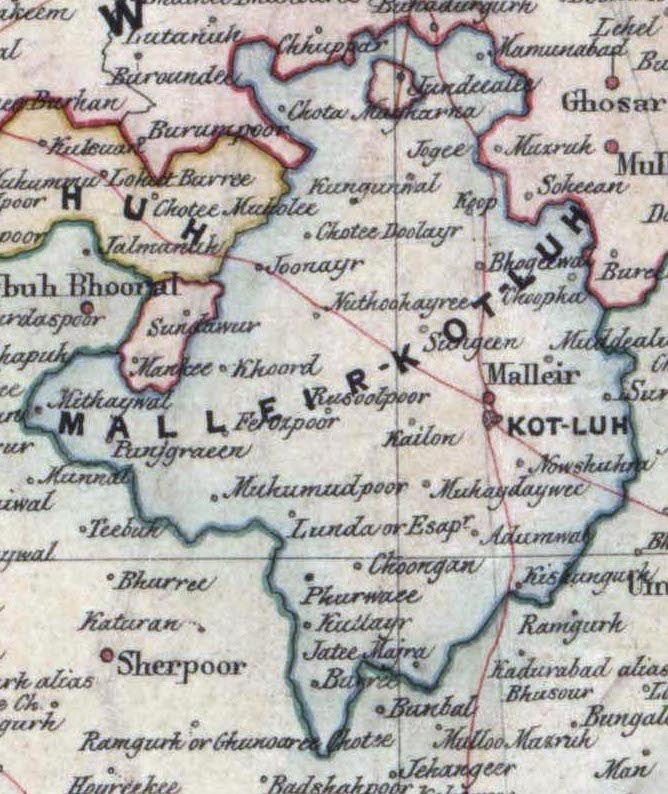
- Detail of Malerkotla State from a map of British and native states in the Cis-Sutlej Division between 1847 and 1851, by Abdos Sobhan, 1858
- Capital: Malerkotla city
- Common languages: Punjabi, Hindi, Urdu
- Religion: Sunni Islam
- Government: Absolute Monarchy
- Nawab of Malerkotla
  - 1657 - 1659: Muhammad Bayazid Khan (First)
  - 1710 or 1712 - 1717: Ghulam Hussain Khan
  - 1717 - 1762: Jamal Khan
  - 1762 - 1763/64: Bhikan Khan
  - 23 August 1908 – 15 August 1947: Ahmad Ali Khan (Last)
- History
  - Established: 1454
  - Accession to India: 20 August 1948

Population
- 77,506
Preceded by	Succeeded by
Lodi dynasty	Dominion of India

The State of Malerkotla or Maler Kotla was a princely state in British India, ruled by a dynasty of Afghan origin in the Punjab region established in the medieval era and lasting to the end of British India. It has been described as being a princely enclave.

Its rulers belonged to a Sarwani and Lodi Pashtun dynasty from Afghanistan, and its capital was in Malerkotla. In the 19th century, the Muslim-ruled state was surrounded by Sikh states. The state belonged to the Punjab States Agency. During the partition of Punjab in 1947, the state was mostly spared from bloodshed from Sikh mobs owing to the role the former ruler of the polity played in attempting to safeguard the sons of Guru Gobind Singh. The last Nawab of Maler Kotla signed the instrument of accession to join the Dominion of India on 20 August 1948.

== History ==
=== Origins ===
Company painting of Afghans of Malerkotla, c. 1830–40

The area, which was known as Maler, was received as a jagir in 1454 A.D. by Sheikh Sadruddin-i-Jahān, a pious man of the Sherwani tribe of Afghanistan, and was ruled by his descendants.

Local tradition says that Bahlul Lodi (1451–1489), the Afghan king who had most of western India under his control, desired to rule Delhi and on his way, he was caught in a sand drift. In the darkness the king spotted a dim light of a lamp still burning in the wind. It was the hut of Sheikh Sadruddin and when the king found out he came to the hut to show his respect and asked the holy man to pray for him to bear a son and achieve victory. During 1451 and 1452, the king married off his daughter Taj Murassa to Sheikh Sadruddin after being enthroned in Delhi, and also gave him the area of Maler as a jagir.

The descendants of Sheikh Sadruddin branched into two groups. One started ruling the state and were given the title of Nawab when the Mughal Empire arose. The other branch lived around the Shrine of Sheikh Sadruddin, controlling the revenue from pilgrims.

=== 17th century ===
The State of Malerkotla was established in 1657 by Bayazid Khan. After saving the life of Mughal Emperor Aurangzeb in a tiger attack, Bayazid Khan was granted the privilege to build a fort, which he named Malerkotla and eventually gave its name to the state. He was first Nawab of the state.

=== 18th century ===
The roots of communal harmony in the area date back to 1705, when Fateh Singh and Zorawar Singh, the 9- and 7-year-old sons of 10th Sikh Guru, Guru Gobind Singh, were ordered to be bricked alive by the governor of Sirhind, Wazir Khan. His close relative, Sher Mohammed Khan, Nawab of Malerkotla, who was present in the court, lodged a vehement protest against this inhuman act and said it was against the teachings of Islam. Wazir Khan nevertheless had the boys bricked into a section of wall while still alive. At this, the Nawab of Malerkotla walked out of the court in protest. Guru Gobind Singh on learning this approach profusely thanked the Nawab of Malerkotla and blessed him with his hukamnama and kirpan. Banda Singh Bahadur's avoidance of attacking Malerkotla has been attributed to the actions of Sher Mohammed Khan, however J.S. Grewal notes that Banda's passivity towards the state was due to his prescribed route taking him elsewhere. Wars between Malerkotla state (originally siding with the Mughals, and later the forces of Ahmad Shah Abdali and the Rohilla Afghans, both of whom repeatedly raided Punjab during the eighteenth century) and the Sikh powers in Punjab resumed shortly after. Relations between the two oscillated during this period- involving events of intermittent warring as well as interventions of mutual defense against certain extra-local Sikh invaders.

Nawab Bikhan Khan had assisted the Durranis and participated in Vadda Ghulaghara genocide of Sikhs on 5 February 1762. The triump of the Sikhs after the Battle of Sirhind (1764) attracted the hostilities of the Malerkotla ruler Bhikhan Khan, whom was anxious about a similar fate for Malerkotla, as Malerkotla had assisted Zain Khan in the Vadda Ghalughara massacre. Amar Singh of Patiala and Bhikhan Khan later would fight at Kakra, with Patiala prevailing and capturing the settlements of Sherpur and Bhasaur, and the Malerkotla ruler being killed. Also, Amar Singh obtained an Afghan sword of the Malerkotla ruler as war-booty.

From 1785 until the Second Anglo-Maratha War (1803–1805), the Cis-Sutlej states—including Patiala, Nabha, Jind, Faridkot, and Malerkotla—were under the suzerainty or political influence of the Scindia dynasty of the Maratha Empire.

In 1795, Sahib Singh Bedi, a descendant of Guru Nanak, attacked Malerkotla, in part due to the issue of cow slaughter taking place in the city as well as other motivations influencing the expedition including the role of the nawab in the killing of a relative of Guru Gobind, as well as the contemporary nawab's ostensible role in the Vadda Ghallugura- a massacre in which 25,000 Sikhs were said to have been killed. His forces were stopped and repelled, with assistance coming from the rulers of Patiala.

=== 19th century ===
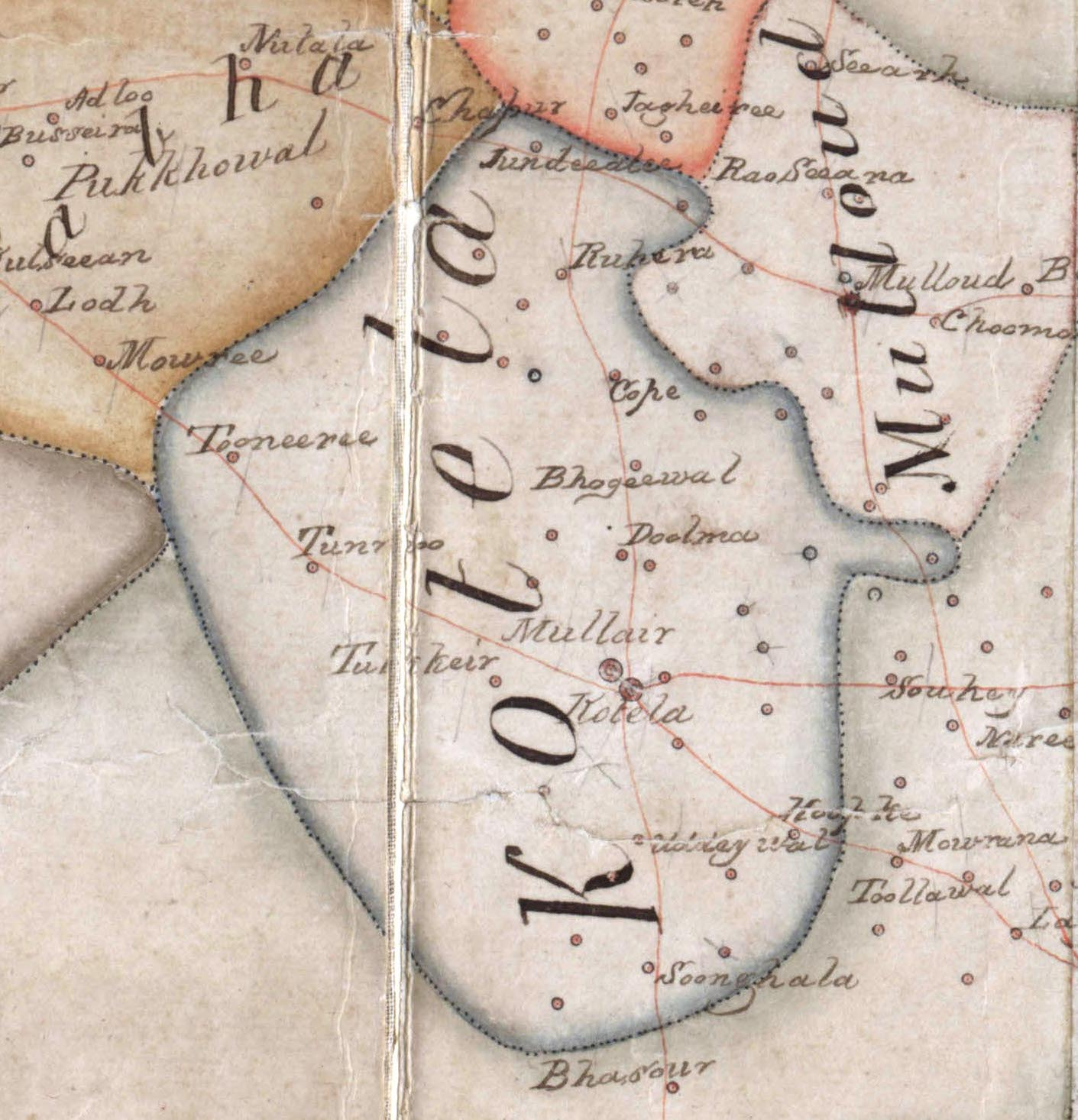
Detail of the main, continuous tract of territory of Malerkotla State from a map created by the British East India Company, ca.1829–1835.

In 1808, Ranjit Singh arrived at the town and demanded an extortionate tribute of one million rupees from the state. Upon the nawab's inability to accumulate this wealth, Ranjit Singh attacked, forcing the nawab to take loans from wealthier Sikh neighbors to pay the due. The nawab subsequently appealed to the British and shortly after ceded to British suzerainty. On 3 May 1809 Maler Kotla became a British protectorate and was made part of the Cis-Sutlej states until 1862. Malerkotla ranked 12th in the Punjab Darbar in 1890.

=== Partition of India ===
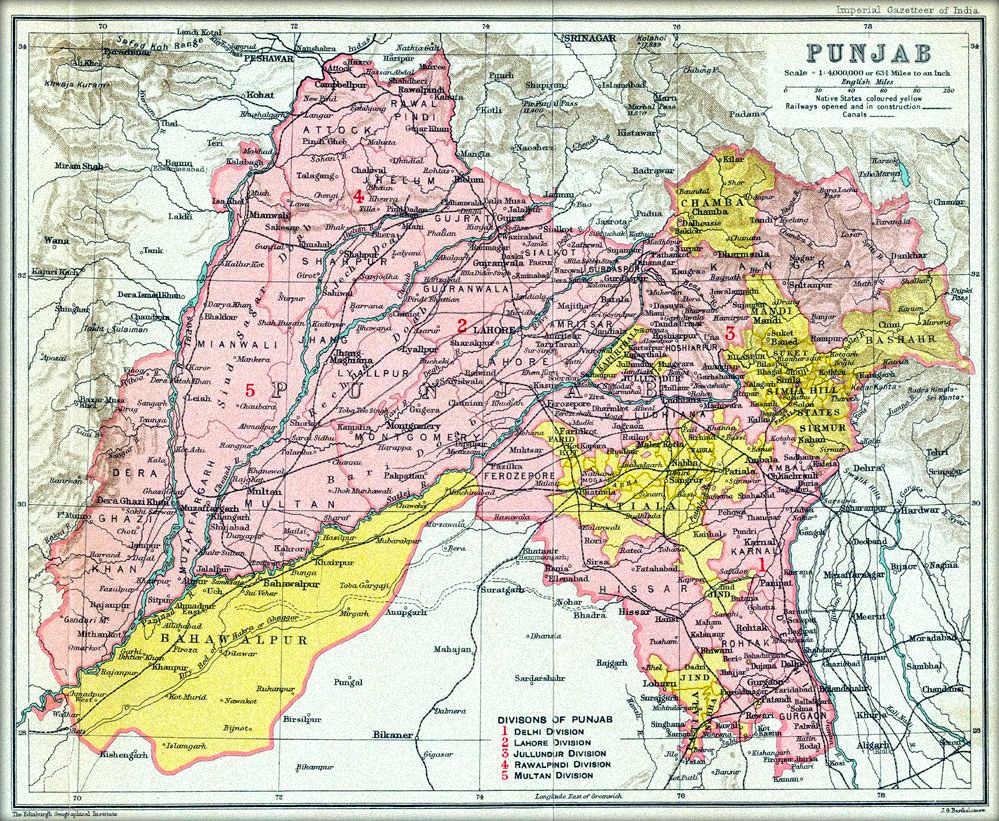
1909 Malerkotla State Located in the Punjab Agency bordered by Patiala State and Ludhiana district

During the 1947 riots when Punjab was in flames, the State of Malerkotla did not witness a single incident of violence; through it all, it remained a lone island of peace. The State of Malerkotla experienced relatively insignificant communal violence due to the aforementioned objections of Sher Mohammed Khan to Wazir Khan's handling of Gobind Singh's sons. Many local people attribute this peaceful strain to the presence of the shrine of 'Baba Haidar Sheikh', the Sufi saint, who founded the town of Malerkotla more than 500 years ago. The ruling family of Sheikh Sadruddin Sherwani migrated to Pakistan and lived mostly in Model Town, Lahore, Muzaffargarh, Khangarh.

=== Post-independence ===
Following Indian independence and the signing of the instrument of accession to the Dominion of India in 1948, Maler Kotla joined the newly established state of Patiala and East Punjab States Union (PEPSU) until its merger with Punjab in 1956.

== Demographics ==
Religious groups in Malerkotla State (British Punjab province era)
Religious group	1881		1891		1901		1911		1921		1931		1941	
Religious group	Pop.	%	Pop.	%	Pop.	%	Pop.	%	Pop.	%	Pop.	%	Pop.	%
Sikhism	28,931	40.72%	7,625	10.07%	10,495	13.54%	21,018	29.54%	21,828	27.18%	28,982	34.89%	30,320	34.41%
Islam	24,616	34.65%	26,866	35.46%	27,229	35.13%	25,942	36.46%	28,413	35.37%	31,417	37.82%	33,881	38.45%
Hinduism (Note: 1931-1941: Including Ad-Dharmis)	16,178	22.77%	39,973	52.77%	38,409	49.56%	22,902	32.19%	29,459	36.68%	21,252	25.58%	23,482	26.65%
Jainism	1,323	1.86%	1,276	1.68%	1,361	1.76%	1,268	1.78%	585	0.73%	1,286	1.55%	310	0.35%
Christianity	3	0%	15	0.02%	12	0.02%	14	0.02%	37	0.05%	135	0.16%	116	0.13%
Zoroastrianism	0	0%	0	0%	0	0%	0	0%	0	0%	0	0%	0	0%
Buddhism	0	0%	0	0%	0	0%	0	0%	0	0%	0	0%	0	0%
Judaism	—N/a	—N/a	0	0%	0	0%	0	0%	0	0%	0	0%	0	0%
Others	0	0%	0	0%	0	0%	0	0%	0	0%	0	0%	0	0%
Total population	71,051	100%	75,755	100%	77,506	100%	71,144	100%	80,322	100%	83,072	100%	88,109	100%
Note: British Punjab province era district borders are not an exact match in the present-day due to various bifurcations to district borders — which since created new districts — throughout the historic Punjab Province region during the post-independence era that have taken into account population increases.

== List of rulers ==
=== Chiefs ===
The chiefs were the holders of the jagir of Malerkotla.

Name		Reign Began	Reign Ended
1	Sheikh Sadruddin (b. 1434 - d. 1515)	1454	1508
2	Sheikh Muhammad Isa (d. 1538)	1508	1538
3	Khan Muhammad Shah (d. 1545)	1538	1545
4	Khan Muhammad Ishaq Khan (d. 1556)	1545	1556
5	Khan Fateh Muhammad Khan (d. 1600)	1556	1600
6	Muhammad Bayazid Khan Bahadur (b. 1593 - d. 1659)	1600	1657

=== Rulers ===
The rulers were titled 'Nawab'. They had the right to an 14 gun salute.

Name		Portrait	Reign Began	Reign Ended
1	Muhammad Bayazid Khan Bahadur (b. 1593 - d. 1659)		1657	1659
2	Feroz Khan (b. 1616 - d. 1672)		1659	1672
3	Sher Muhammad Khan Bahadur (b. 1640 - d. 1710 or 1712)		1672	1710 or 1712
4	Ghulam Hussain Khan (d. 1734)		1710 or 1712	1717
5	Jamal Khan (d. 1762)		1717	1762
6	Bhikan Khan (d. 1763/64)		1762	1763/64
	Khan Sahib Khan Bahadur Khan (d. 1766) - Regent		1764	1766
7	Khan Sahib Umar Khan (d. 1780)		1766	1 November 1780
8	Khan Sahib Asadullah Khan (d. 1784)		1 November 1780	Apr 1784
9	Khan Sahib Ataullah Khan (d. 1809)		Apr 1784	14 August 1809
10	Muhammad Wazir Ali Khan (b. 17.. - d. 1821)		14 August 1809	4 September 1821
11	Amir Ali Khan Bahadur (d. 1846)		4 September 1821	8 April 1846
12	Mahbub Ali Khan Bahadur (d. 1857) "Sube Khan"		8 April 1846	25 November 1857
13	Sikandar Ali Khan Bahadur (d. 1871)		25 November 1857	16 July 1871
14	Muhammad Ibrahim Ali Khan (b. 1857 - d. 1908)		16 July 1871	23 August 1908
	Sir Ahmad Ali Khan Regent		1 February 1905	23 August 1908
15	Ahmad Ali Khan (b. 1881 - d. 1947) – Acceded to the Dominion of India		23 August 1908	15 August 1947

==== Titular Rulers ====
Name	Portrait	Reign Began	Reign Ended	Notes
Iftikhar Ali Khan (d. 1982)		15 August 1947	20 November 1982	Retained official recognition until 1971 under the 26th Amendment to the Constitution of India by Indira Gandhi's government.

== See also ==
- Malerkotla
- Malerkotla district
- Punjab States Agency
- List of Sunni Muslim dynasties
- Patiala and East Punjab States Union
