= Northern Cavaliers =

Pakistani field hockey team

- Full name: Northern Cavaliers
- League: Pakistan Super Hockey League
- Founded: 2005

Northern Cavaliers was a field hockey team representing the Northern Areas in Pakistan. It played in the Pakistan Super Hockey League. It was sponsored by Saudi Pak Commercial Bank.

The team finished runners-up in the inaugural Pakistan Super Hockey League in 2005, losing against Sindh Qalandars in the final.

== Squad (2005) ==
Nasim Ahmed (PIA), M. Imran (Army), Amin Saleem (PIA), Sultan Ashraf (Wapda), Khalid Mahmood (HBL), Dilawar (Army), Rehan Butt (Wapda), Saleem Khalid (PTCL), Mahmood Ali (PIA), Muhammad Nadeem (NBP, captain), Akhtar Ali (NBP), Shakir Muneer (Wapda), Arjun Halappa (India), Fayaz Ahmed (ABL), Ishtiaq Ahmad (Pak Steel), Kashif Yaqoob (PAF), Mudassar Abbas (SSGC), Rauf (Pak Steel), Yasin Dilawar (Customs).

Officials: Ashraf Awan (Manager), Rana Zaheer (Coach), Safdar Abbas (Assistant Coach), Arshad Hussain (Goal-keeper coach)
