= Sarwani =

Pashtun tribe (also spelt Sherwani)

Shirvani, or Sarwani (Pashto شیروانی) is a Bettani Pashtun tribe.

== Distribution ==
Shirvani, Sherwani, Shervani, Sheherwani or Sarwani (Pashto شیروانی) is a Pashtun tribe primarily found in Afghanistan with a significant minority found in Balochistan, Khyber Pakhtunkhwa, and in Malerkotla, Punjab.

== Origin ==
According to the book The Regimental History of the Malerkotla Sappers and Miners, the Shirvani Tribe originates, and takes its name from, the region of Shirvan in the Caucasus/Persia.

Other theories of the origin of the Sarwani people state that they originate from the city of Sherran or Current Iran-Afghan bordered Regions and from the Ghazni province.

== See also ==
- Shirvan
- Malerkotla State
- Malerkotla
- Shirani (Pashtun tribe)
- Suri (Pashtun)
- Ghor Province
- Sherwani (surname)
