= Tauqeer Dar =

Pakistani field hockey player

Personal information
- Born: 31 January 1964 (age 62)
Medal record
Men's field hockey
Representing Pakistan
Olympic Games
Gold medal – first place	1984 Los Angeles	Team

Tauqeer Dar (born 31 January 1964) is a former field hockey player from Pakistan. He was the member of the winning Pakistani team in 1984 Summer Olympics. He is the son of Munir Ahmad Dar and the nephew of Tanvir Dar. He is also the son-in-law of Khawaja Zaka-ud-Din who was the head-coach of Pakistani hockey team for 1984 Summer Olympics.

He later became a coach for the Pakistan Hockey Team.

== See also ==
- Pakistan Hockey Federation
