= Sindh Qalandars =

Pakistani field hockey team

- Full name: Sindh Qalandars
- League: Pakistan Super Hockey League
- Founded: 2005

Sindh Qalandars was a field hockey team representing the Sindh province in Pakistan. It played in the Pakistan Super Hockey League. It was sponsored by Sui Southern Gas Company.

The team won the inaugural Pakistan Super Hockey League in 2005, defeating Northern Cavaliers in the final.

== Squad (2005) ==
Ahmed Alam (PIA, captain), Dilip Tirkey (India), Tariq Yameen (HBL), Gohar Rasool (Wapda), Atif Mushtaq (Customs), Asim Khan (NBP), Adnan Zakir (NBP), Kashif Jawed (HBL), Muhammad Zubair (PTCL), Muhammad Shahbir (Wapda), Rashid (Pak Army), M. Khaliq (HBL), Mazhar (Customs), Zeeshan (PAF), Ranan Fayyaz (PIA), Mukhtar Hussain (PIA), Rashid (KESC), Sameer Hussain (HBL), Ishtiaq Mubin (SSGC), Wasif Raza (SSGC)

Officials: Akhtar-ul-Islam (Manager), Nasir Ali (Coach), Weseem Feroz (Assiatant Coach), Mansoor Ahmed (Goal-keeper trainer)
