= Sherwani (surname) =

Surname list: Roshaan Sherwani, Lahore based musician

Sherwani is a surname, possibly originating from Sherwan from Khyber-Pakhtunkhwa, Pakistan or Sarwani, a pashtun tribe people originate from the city of Sherran or current Iran-Afghan bordered regions and from the Ghazni province.

Notable people with the surname include:

- Arfa Khanum Sherwani (born 1980), Indian journalist
- Haroon Khan Sherwani (1891–1980), Indian historian
- Imran Sherwani (1962–2025), English field hockey player
- Jalees Sherwani (died 2018), Indian screenwriter and lyricist
- Saleem Sherwani (field hockey forward) (born 1962)
- Saleem Sherwani (field hockey goalkeeper) (born 1951)
