= Samiullah Khan =

Governor of the State of Sahaspur

- Spouse: Ghafoorunisa
- Issue: Arghwani Begum

Samiullah Khan was the governor of the Princely State of Sahaspur before partition of India.

== Rule ==
State of Sahaspur had 22 villages under its command in the current Bijnor district of Uttar Pradesh state of India.

== Family ==
=== Daughters ===
- Arghwani Begum (born 2nd January, 1922), she had two daughters (Nabahat and Sabahat) and a son.

== See also ==
- State of Sahaspur
