= Iftikhar Ali Khan of Malerkotla =

Iftikhar Ali Khan
- Nawab, Sir, KCSI, KCIE
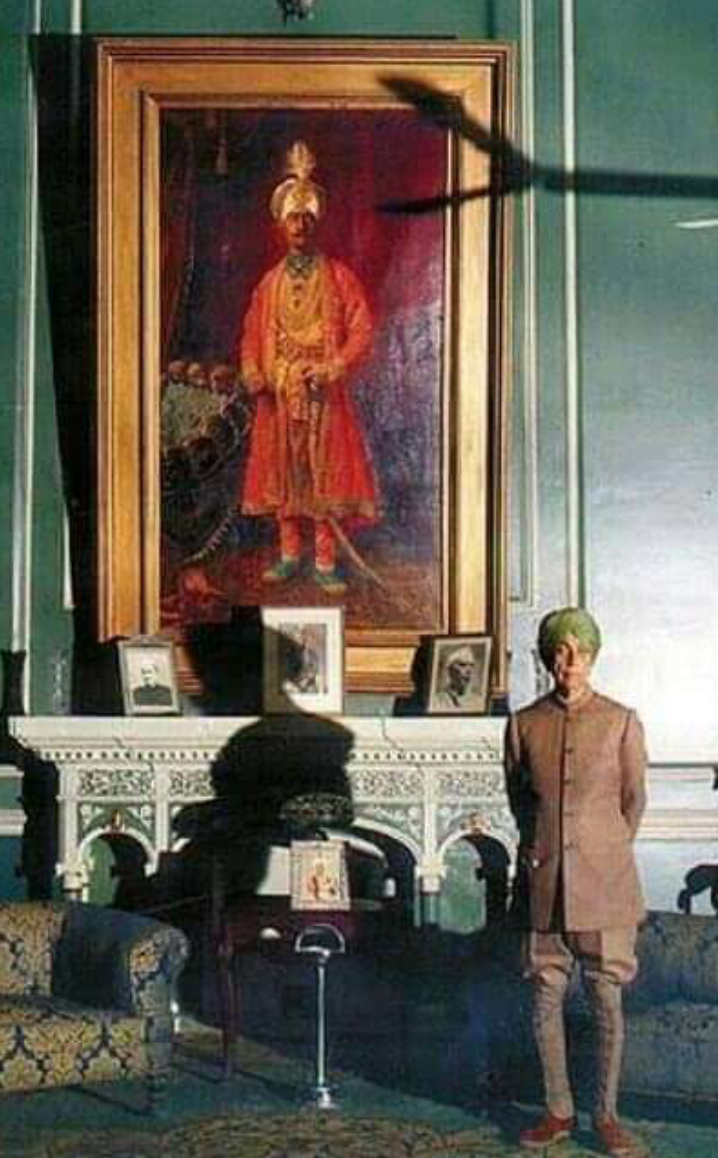
- Iftikhar Ali Khan

Nawab of Malerkotla
- Reign: 16 Oct 1947 – 20 Nov 1982
- Coronation: 26 Nov 1947
- Predecessor: Ahmad Ali Khan of Malerkotla
- Successor: Kazim Ali Khan
- Born: Muhammad Iftikhar Ali; 20 May 1904; Malerkotla, Malerkotla State (present-day Punjab, India)
- Died: 20 November 1982 (aged 78); Malerkotla, Punjab, India
- Burial: Shahi Maqbara, Malerkotla
- Begum (wives): Begum Zubaida; Begum Yusuf Zamani; Begum Munawar-un-nisa; Begum Sajida
- Issue: None.
- Father: Ahmad Ali Khan of Malerkotla
- Mother: Malika Zamani
- Religion: Sunni Islam

H.H. Nawab Muhammad Iftikhar 'Ali Khan Bahadur (20 May 1904 – 20 November 1982), was the Nawab of the princely state of Malerkotla. Born at Malerkotla, he was the eldest son of Ahmad Ali Khan of Malerkotla by his second wife Malika Zamani.
