= National Hockey Championship (Pakistan) =

- Sport: Field hockey
- Founded: 1948; 78 years ago
- First season: 1948
- Administrator: Pakistan Hockey Federation
- Country: Pakistan
- Most recent champion: Pakistan Customs (9th title)
- Most titles: PIA (29 titles)
- 2027

The National Hockey Championship is the top level field hockey competition of Pakistan, contested by the regional associations and departmental teams under Pakistan Hockey Federation, the sport's governing body in Pakistan. It was first held in 1948 and is the premier competition of field hockey in Pakistan since.

== Results ==
Ed.	Year	Host City	Winners	Runner-ups	Ref.
1	1948	Lahore	Punjab	Karachi	
2	1949	Peshawar	Karachi	Pakistan Navy	
3	1950	Lahore	NWFP	Karachi	
4	1952	Peshawar	Punjab	Pakistan Army	
5	1954	Quetta	Pakistan Army	Punjab	
6	1955	Karachi	Pakistan Railways	Pakistan Army	
7	1956	Lahore	Pakistan Army	Pakistan Railways	
8	1958	Lahore	Lahore Reds	Lahore Blues	
9	1959	Lahore	Pakistan Railways	Pakistan Army Reds	
10	1960	Karachi	West Pakistan Police	Lahore	
11	1961	Hyderabad	Pakistan Army	Lahore	
12	1962	Lahore	Pakistan Army Reds	Pakistan Army Whites	
13	1963	Rawalpindi	Karachi	Sargodha	
14	1964	Peshawar	PIA	Karachi	
15	1965	Lyallpur	Pakistan Railways	PIA	
16	1966	Rawalpindi	PIA	Pakistan Army	
17	1967	Karachi	PIA	Pakistan Railways	
18	1968	Bahawalpur	Pakistan Railways	PIA	
19	1969	Dhaka	Pakistan Customs	PIA	
20	1970	Rawalpindi	Pakistan Customs	Police	
21	1971	Karachi	Pakistan Customs	PIA	
22	1972	Multan	PIA	Police	
23	1973	Lahore	Pakistan Customs	Lahore	
24	1973	Lahore	PIA	Pakistan Customs	
25	1974	Peshawar	Peshawar	Pakistan Customs	
26	1975	Lyallpur	PIA	Police	
27	1976	Lahore	PIA	Pakistan Army	
28	1977	Karachi	PIA	Karachi	
29	1979	Faisalabad	PIA	NBP	
30	1980	Karachi	PIA	Pakistan Customs	
31	1982	Lahore	PIA	Pakistan Customs	
32	1983	Sahiwal	PIA	UBL	
33	1984	Karachi	Pakistan Customs	PIA	
34	1985	Peshawar	Pakistan Customs & PIA were joint winners		
35	1986	Bahawalpur	Pakistan Customs	UBL	
36	1987	Quetta	PIA	NBP	
37	1988	Lahore	Pakistan Customs	NBP	
38	1989	Lahore	PIA	NBP	
39	1990	Karachi	NBP	UBL	
40	1991	Peshawar	PIA	NBP	
41	1992	Rawalpindi	PIA	Pakistan Customs	
42	1993	Lahore	Police	UBL	
43	1995	Karachi	PIA Colour	NBP	
44	1996	Peshawar	PIA Whites	PIA Colour	
45	1997	Lahore	PIA Colour	PIA Whites	
46	1997	Karachi	PIA	Police	
47	1999	Lahore	Police	Pakistan Customs	
48	2001	Lahore	PIA	HBL	
49	2002	Lahore	PIA	ABL	
50	2003	Karachi	WAPDA	HBL	
51	2004	Peshawar	WAPDA	PTCL	
52	2005	Karachi	PTCL	WAPDA	
53	2006	Karachi	WAPDA	PIA	
54	2007	Lahore	NBP	WAPDA	
55	2008	Lahore	PIA	Pakistan Army	
56	2009	Lahore	PIA	NBP	
57	2010	Karachi	WAPDA	NBP	
58	2011	Faisalabad	NBP	PIA	
59	2012	Karachi	PIA	WAPDA	
60	2013	Lahore	NBP	PIA	
61	2014-15	Sialkot	PIA	WAPDA	
62	2015-16	Karachi	PIA	WAPDA	
63	2016-17	Lahore	PIA	NBP	
64	2017-18	Sukkur	NBP	WAPDA	
65	2019	Karachi	NBP	SSGC	
66	2020	Rawalpindi	WAPDA	NBP	
67	2023	Rawalpindi	Mari Petroleum	WAPDA	
68	2025	Karachi	Pakistan Customs	Mari Petroleum	
69	2027	Karachi	TBA	TBA	

== Performance by teams ==
Team	Championships
PIA	29
Pakistan Customs	9
NBP	6
WAPDA	5
Pakistan Army	4
Pakistan Railways	4
Punjab	2
Karachi	2
Police	2
Mari Petroleum	1
NWFP	1
Lahore	1
West Pakistan Police	1
Peshawar	1
PTCL	1
