= Malerkotla =

Malerkotla Malērkōṭlā (Punjabi)
- City
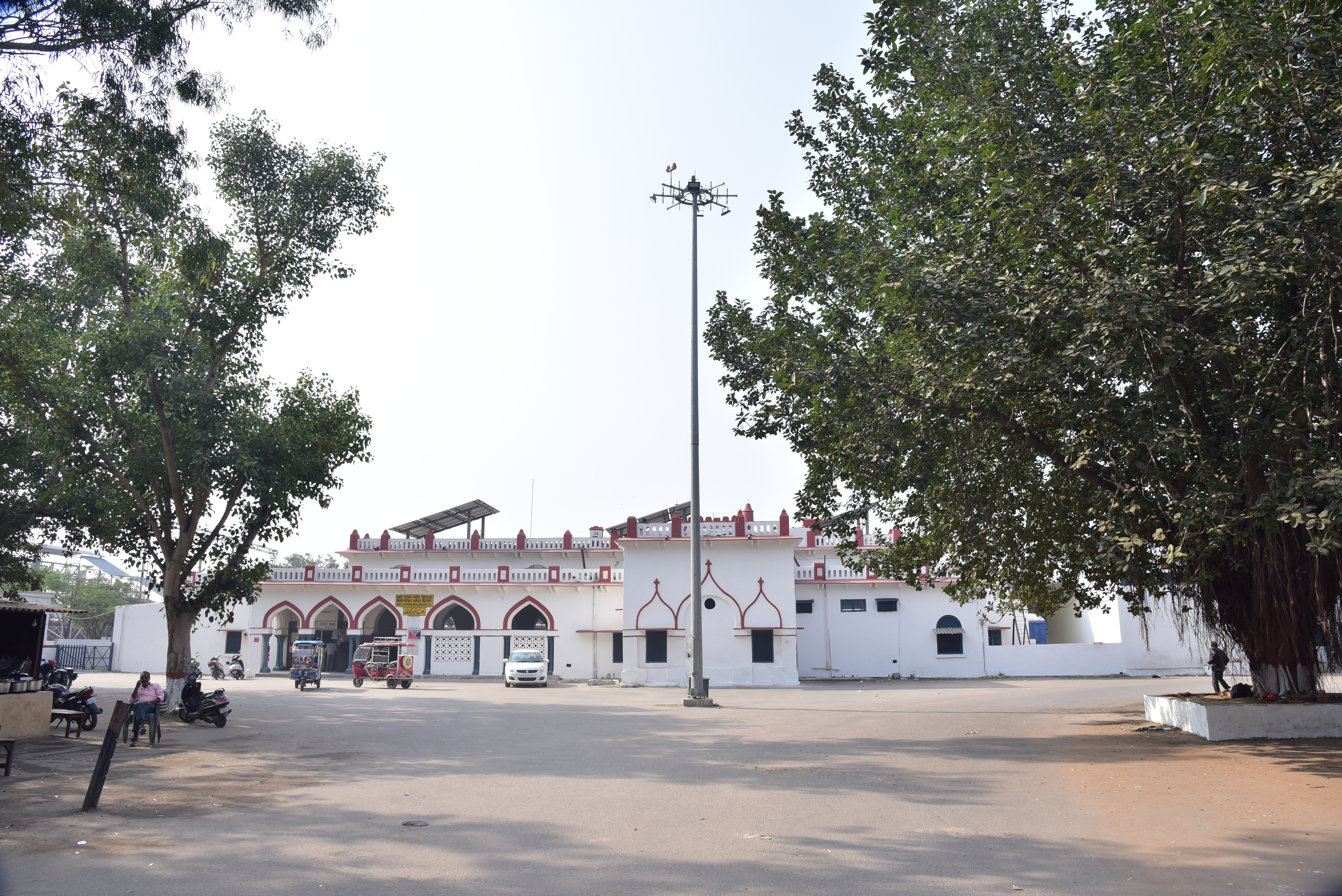
- Mubarak Manzil, Moti Bazaar, Railway Station, Delhi Gate, Sirhindi Gate, Gurudwara Sahib Haaw Da Naara, and Malerkotla Fort

- Location in Punjab, India Malerkotla (India)
- Coordinates: 30.5167°N 75.8833°E
- Country: India
- State: Punjab
- District: Malerkotla
- Established: 1657
- Founder: Ismail Khan
- Named for: Sardar Maler Kotla Wala

Government
  - Type: Municipal Council
  - Body: Municipal Council Malerkotla

Area 788
  - City: 122 km^{2} (47 sq mi)
  - Urban: 457 km^{2} (176 sq mi)
  - Metro: 456 km^{2} (176 sq mi)
  - Rank: 12th

Population
  - City: 135,424
  - Rank: 31st
  - Density: 1,110/km^{2} (2,870/sq mi)
  - Urban: 374,000
  - Metro: 236,000
- Time zone: UTC+5:30 (IST)
- PIN: 148023
- Vehicle registration: PB-28
- Website: www.malerkotla.nic.in

Malerkotla is a municipality in Punjab, India. It is the administrative headquarters of Malerkotla district, belonging to the Patiala division. Located in the fertile heart of Malwa, Malerkotla is located approximately 45–50 kilometres (28–31 mi) south of Ludhiana and 35 kilometres (22 mi) south of Sangrur. As per the 2011 census, the city's population was estimated to be 135,424 with 236,000 people in the wider urban region.

The city was formed in the 15th century by Sheikh Sadruddin from Afghanistan, popularly known as Baba Haider Sheikh. Malerkotla served as the seat of the eponymous princely state during the British Raj. It holds a special revered place in the Sikh history; in 1705, Nawab Sher Mohammad Khan of Malerkotla vocally protested the execution of younger sons (Chhote Sahibzade) of Guru Gobind Singh—Fateh Singh and Zorawar Singh by the governor of Sirhind—Wazir Khan. Guru Gobind Singh on learning of this approach had blessed the Nawab and the people of Malerkotla that the city would live in peace and happiness. In recognition of that act, the State of Malerkotla did not suffer significantly during the partition of India, in which communal violence and the mass population exchange permeated throughout Punjab..

The state acceded to the union of India in 1947 and was merged with other nearby princely states to form the Patiala and East Punjab States Union (PEPSU), later becoming part of Punjab. In 2021, the city and some adjoining areas were carved out of Sangrur district to form the Malerkotla district, with Malerkotla becoming the district's administrative headquarters. Malerkotla is famous for its food, mosques, badge-making industry, poets, and the ornate tombs of its princely rulers.

== History ==
=== Foundation ===
Malerkotla, a Muslim majority state, was established in 1454 by Sheikh Sadruddin-i-Jahan from Afghanistan, and was ruled by his Sherwani descendants. The State of Malerkotla was established in 1600 A.D. Sheikh Sadruddin settled in the region and married the daughter of Bahlul Khan Lodi of the Delhi Sultanate, who granted him a broad tact of land along the river basin. The fortified city of Kotla was established in 1657 by Bayazid Khan, a direct descendant of Sheikh Sadruddin. According to local records, Bayazid was granted the right to construct a fortified town by the Mughal Emperor Aurangzeb after successfully defending Aurangazeb from a tiger attack. The merger of adjacent settlements formed the city of Malerkotla, as the capital of the Malerkotla State.

=== The State of Malerkotla ===
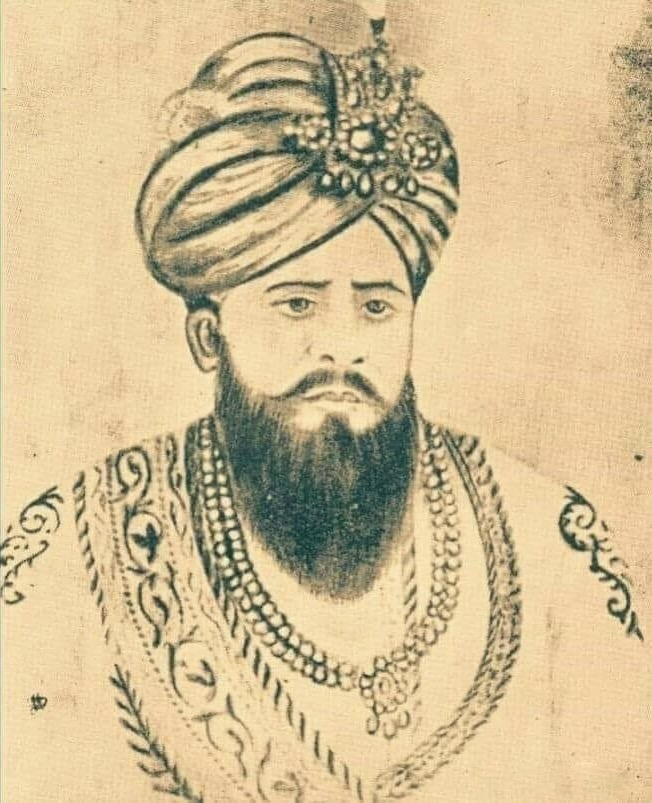
Nawab Sher Muhammad Khan Bahadur of Malerkotla

The roots of communal harmony and special relationship between Sikhs and Muslims of Malerkotla goes back to the period when Guru Gobind Singh—the 10th Sikh Guru engaged in a series of battles with Mughal rules of the region allied with Nawab Sher Mohammad Khan—the Nawab of Malerkotla. Sher Mohammad Khan, also a general in the Mughal Army, actively participated in the military campaigns against Guru Gobind, having lost his brother and nephew in the battle of Chamkaur and was condemned in the case of Anup Kaur. In the aftermath, two younger sons of Guru Gobind known as Chhote Sahibzaade—Zorawar Singh and Fateh Singh, 9 and 7 years old respectively—were captured by the Mughals.

Zorawar Singh and Fateh Singh were ordered to be bricked up alive by the governor (subedar) of Sirhind—Wazir Khan, also a close relative of the Nawab. Though having his brother and nephew killed on the battle, Nawab Sher Mohammad Khan expressed his opposition to the execution and lodged a vehement protest against this act, calling it against Islam and Quran, emphasised that revenge should not be taken on women and children and urged the release of Guru Gobind's wife and children. In the act of protest, the Nawab is said to have walked out, refusing to be a part of what he declared to be opposed to the tenets of Islam. Wazir Khan nevertheless had the boys bricked into a section of wall whilst still alive, while other records state they being executed by beheading.

It is said that he uttered ‘haa’ or ‘hai’ in anguish of the punishment imposed on the two Sahibzadas. This became known as ‘Haa da Naara’—the cry for justice. Guru Gobind Singh on learning of this approach had blessed the Nawab and the people of Malerkotla that the city would live in peace and happiness. A gurudwara, named as Gurudwara Sahib Haw Da Naara, was built by Sikhs in honor the Nawab Sher Mohammad Khan and commemorate his act of protest.

Under British colonial rule, a Namdhari uprising was suppressed, and the colonial government ordered the execution of 65 captured rebels and those thought to be involved with the rebellion. Cowan, the Deputy Commissioner of Ludhiana and Forsyth, the Commissioner of Ambala ordered the Namdharis to be executed with cannons, without any trial, on 17 and 18 January 1872.

=== Post-inedpendence ===
During the partition of India, there were no riots or bloodshed in any part of Malerkotla State. The last Nawab, Iftikhar Ali Khan of Malerkotla, maintained calmness and harmony during the turbulent period. He remained in India and died in the year 1982. His tomb is located in the Shahi graveyard situated at Sirhandi gate, Malerkotla. Many also attribute this peace to the presence of the shrine of Baba Haidar Sheikh, the Sufi saint, who founded the town of Malerkotla more than 500 years ago. The ruling family of Sheikh SadrudDin Sherwani migrated to Pakistan and lived mostly in Model Town, Lahore, Muzaffargarh, and Khangarh.

== Demographics ==
As per provisional data of the 2011 census, the Malerkotla urban agglomeration had a population of 189,424, out of which males were 82,376 and females were 64,048. The literacy rate was 70.25%.

Malerkotla is the only Muslim-majority city of Indian Punjab.

Religion in Malerkotla
Religion	Percent
Islam	68.50%
Hinduism	20.71%
Sikhism	9.50%
Jainism	1.11%
Others	0.19%

Religious groups in Malerkotla City (1881−2011) (Note: 1881-1941: Data for the entirety of the town of Malerkotla, which included Malerkotla Municipality and Malerkotla Civil Lines.)
Religious group	1881		1891		1901		1911		1921		1931		1941		2011	
Religious group	Pop.	%	Pop.	%	Pop.	%	Pop.	%	Pop.	%	Pop.	%	Pop.	%	Pop.	%
Islam	14,468	70.16%	15,520	71.34%	15,056	71.28%	15,666	65.6%	16,599	67.57%	18,449	73.09%	22,296	76.04%	92,765	68.5%
Hinduism	4,584	22.23%	4,961	22.81%	4,673	22.12%	5,801	24.29%	6,701	27.28%	5,246 (Note: 1931-1941: Including Ad-Dharmis)	20.78%	6,270	21.38%	28,044	20.71%
Jainism	1,242	6.02%	1,227	5.64%	1,331	6.3%	1,244	5.21%	583	2.37%	1,240	4.91%	259	0.88%	1,499	1.11%
Sikhism	324	1.57%	37	0.17%	51	0.24%	1,155	4.84%	668	2.72%	269	1.07%	456	1.56%	12,864	9.5%
Christianity	—N/a	—N/a	9	0.04%	11	0.05%	14	0.06%	13	0.05%	36	0.14%	39	0.13%	172	0.13%
Buddhism	—N/a	—N/a	0	0%	0	0%	0	0%	0	0%	0	0%	—N/a	—N/a	26	0.02%
Others	3	0.01%	0	0%	0	0%	0	0%	0	0%	0	0%	1	0%	54	0.04%
Total population	20,621	100%	21,754	100%	21,122	100%	23,880	100%	24,564	100%	25,240	100%	29,321	100%	135,424	100%

== Education ==
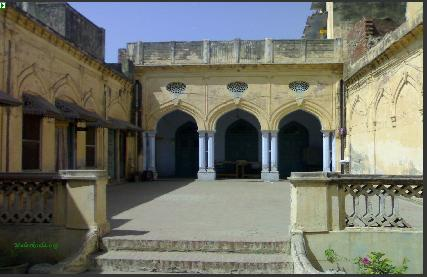
Nawab Sher Mohammad Khan Institute of Advanced Studies, Malerkotla

Urdu is taught alongside Punjabi in Malerkotla schools due to the local Punjabi Muslim majority.

Nawab Sher Mohammad Khan Institute of Advanced Studies in Urdu, Persian and Arabic is part of Punjabi University in Patiala, and is named after one of the founders of Malerkotla State. It provides facilities for higher research in the languages and literature of Urdu and Persian up to PhD level and additionally runs classes for M.A. in Persian, certificate courses in Urdu, Persian and Arabic, MSc in Information Technology two years, MSc in IT lateral entry, PGDCA (one year), CCA (six months) and M.A (psychology).

There are many schools and institutes including Learning Cottage Of Commerce. There are other schools like Sohrab Public Senior Secondary School, Al Falah Public senior secondary School, the town school, Sahibzada Fateh Singh senior secondary public school, Sita grammar school, Sarvhitkari Vidya Mandir, Modern Secular school, DAV public school and many more. Almighty Public School on Almighty School road, Jamalpura, Malerkotla is a co-education, English Medium Sr. Secondary School. This school provides education about Islam for Muslim students.

== Transportation ==
=== Rail ===
Malerkotla is situated on the Delhi-Jakhal-Dhuri-Ludhiana railway line. The nearest railway junctions are Dhuri (18 km [11 mi]) and Ludhiana 45 km [28 mi]).

=== Air ===
The nearest airports to Malerkotla are:

- Chandigarh Airport, also known as Shaheed Bhagat Singh International Airport, Sahibzada Ajit Singh Nagar, Mohali (about 120 km (75 mi) away)
- Sri Guru Ram Dass Jee International Airport, Amritsar (about 250 km (160 mi) away)
- Sahnewal Airport (IATA: LUH, ICAO: VILD), also known as Ludhiana Airport (about 49.8 km (30.9 mi) (66min) away)

== Notable residents ==
- Iftikhar Ali Khan of Malerkotla (Last Nawab of Malerkotla)
- Anas Rashid (Indian television actor)
- Irshad Kamil (Indian lyricist and poet)
- Mohammad Nazim (Indian television actor)
- Razia Sultana (politician) (Indian politician)
- Saeed Jaffrey (Indian actor)
- Ahmad Ali Khan of Malerkotla (Malerkotla Nawab)
- Channi Singh (Indian musician)
- Zeenat Begum (Pakistani singer)
- Bobby Jindal (American politician, 55th Governor of Louisiana)
- Mohammad Sajid Dhot (Indian footballer)
- Dr. Mohammad Jamil Ur Rahman (politician from Aam Aadmi Party)
- Samant Goel (Raw Chief Of India)

== Gallery ==
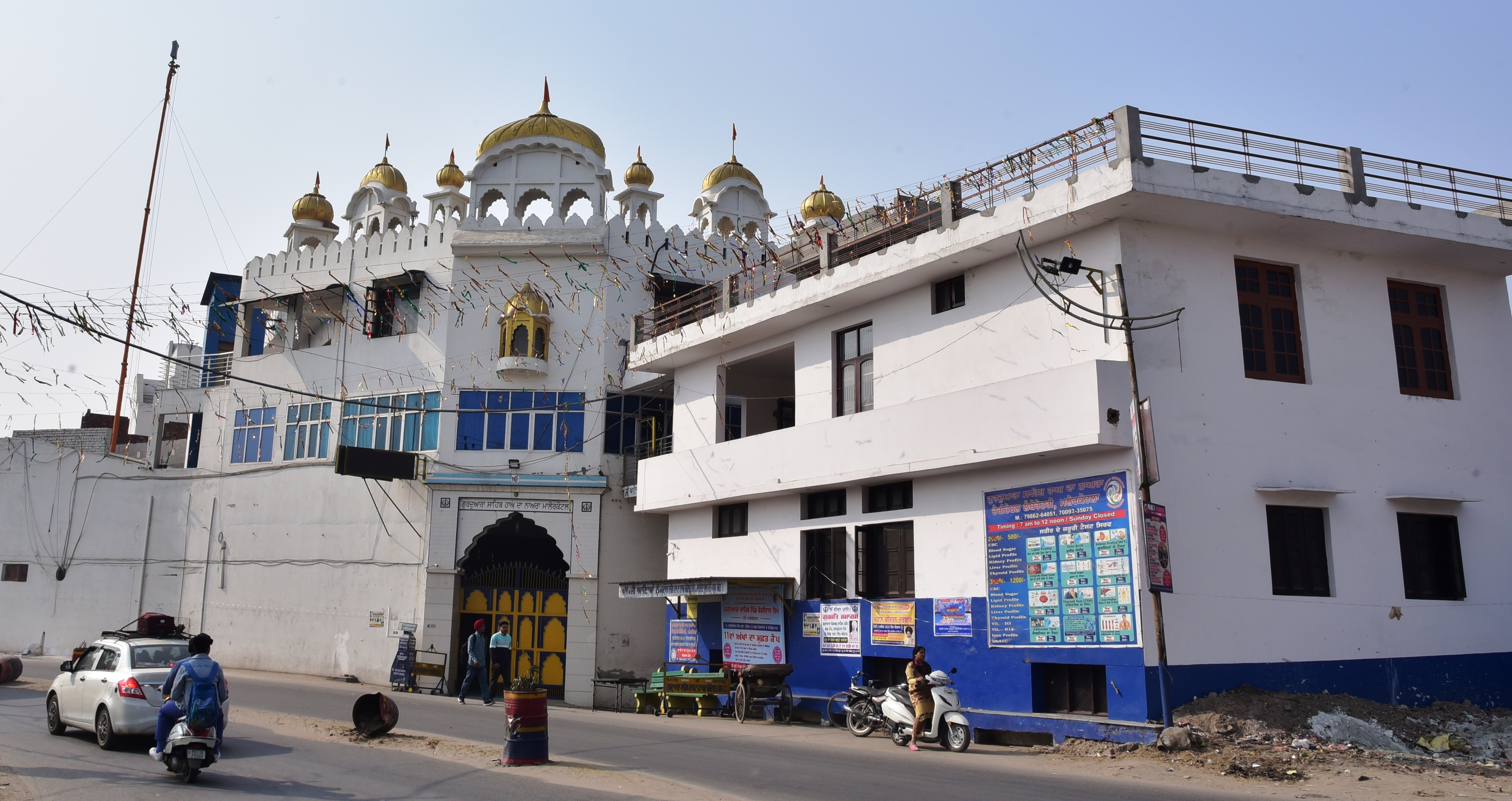
Gurudwara Sahib Haa Da Naara

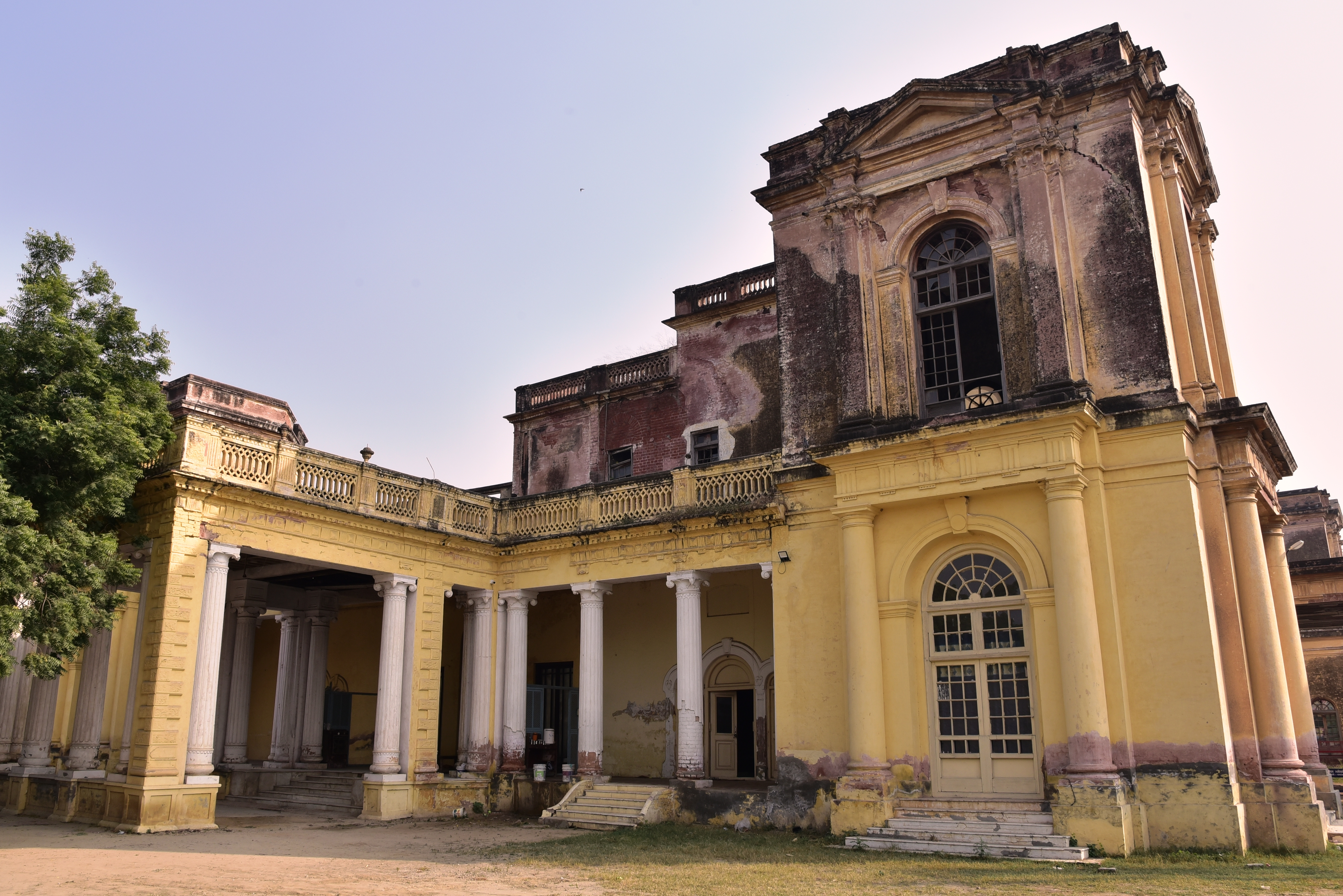
Mubarak Manzil Palace

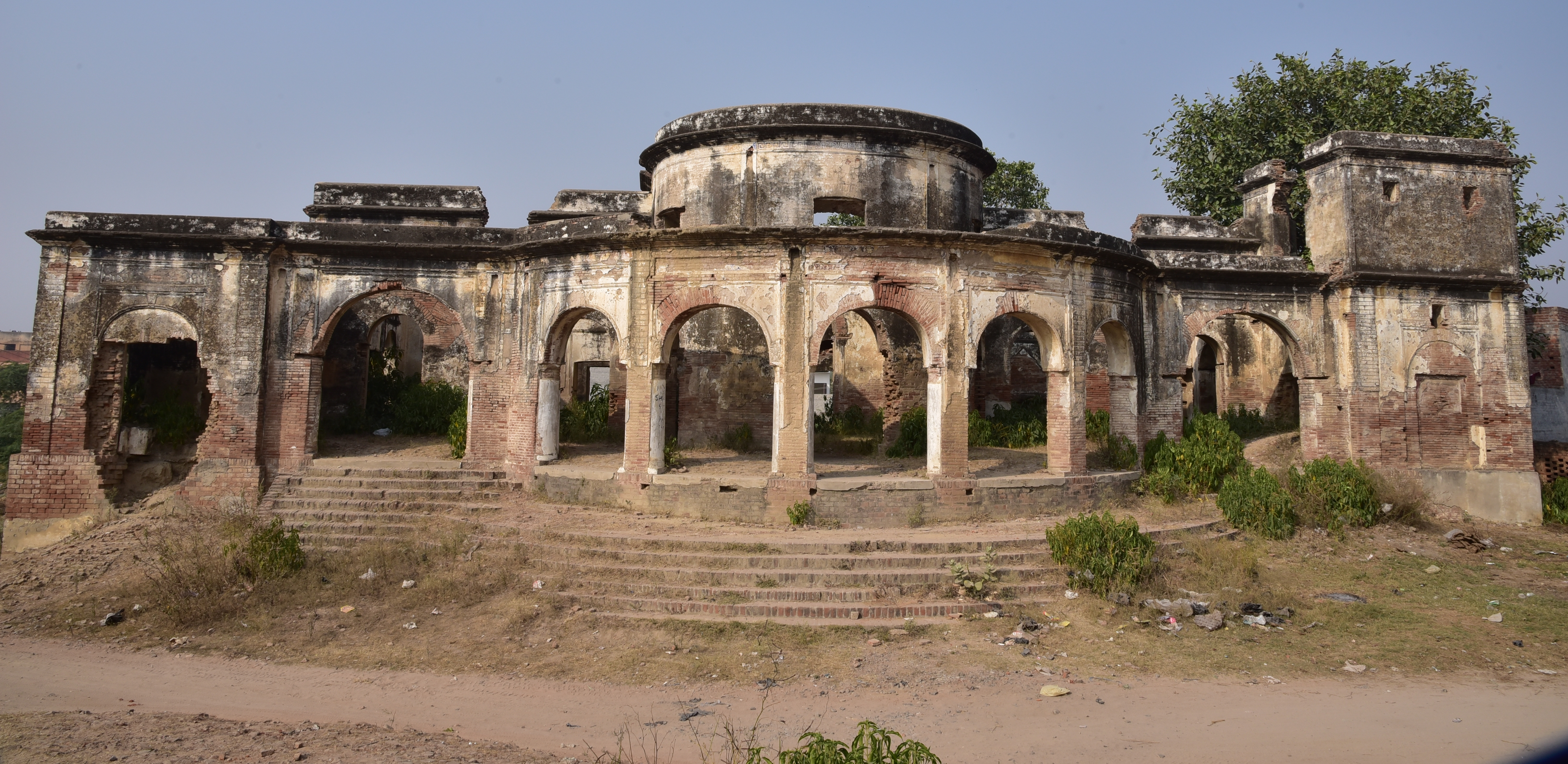
Qila

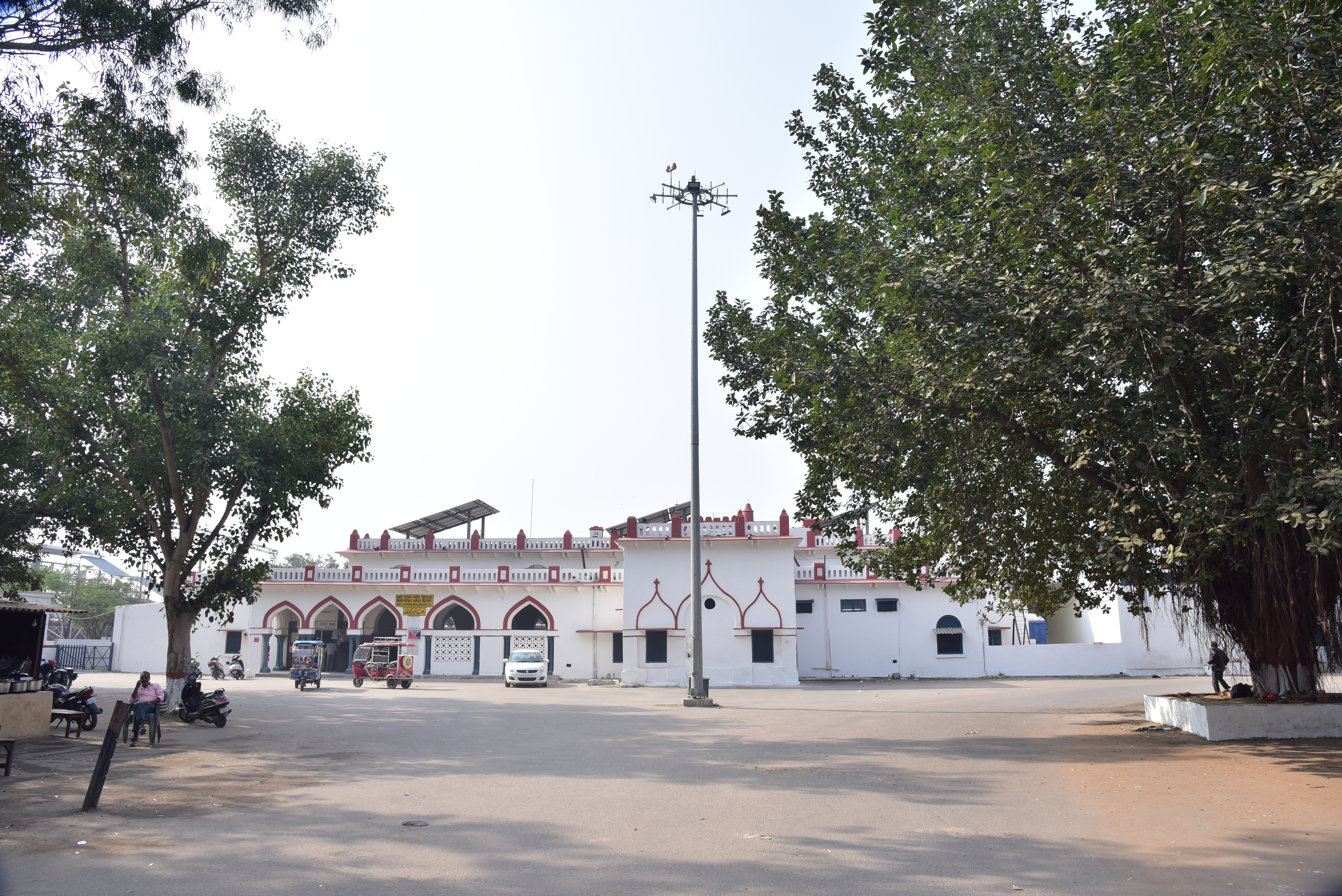
Railway station

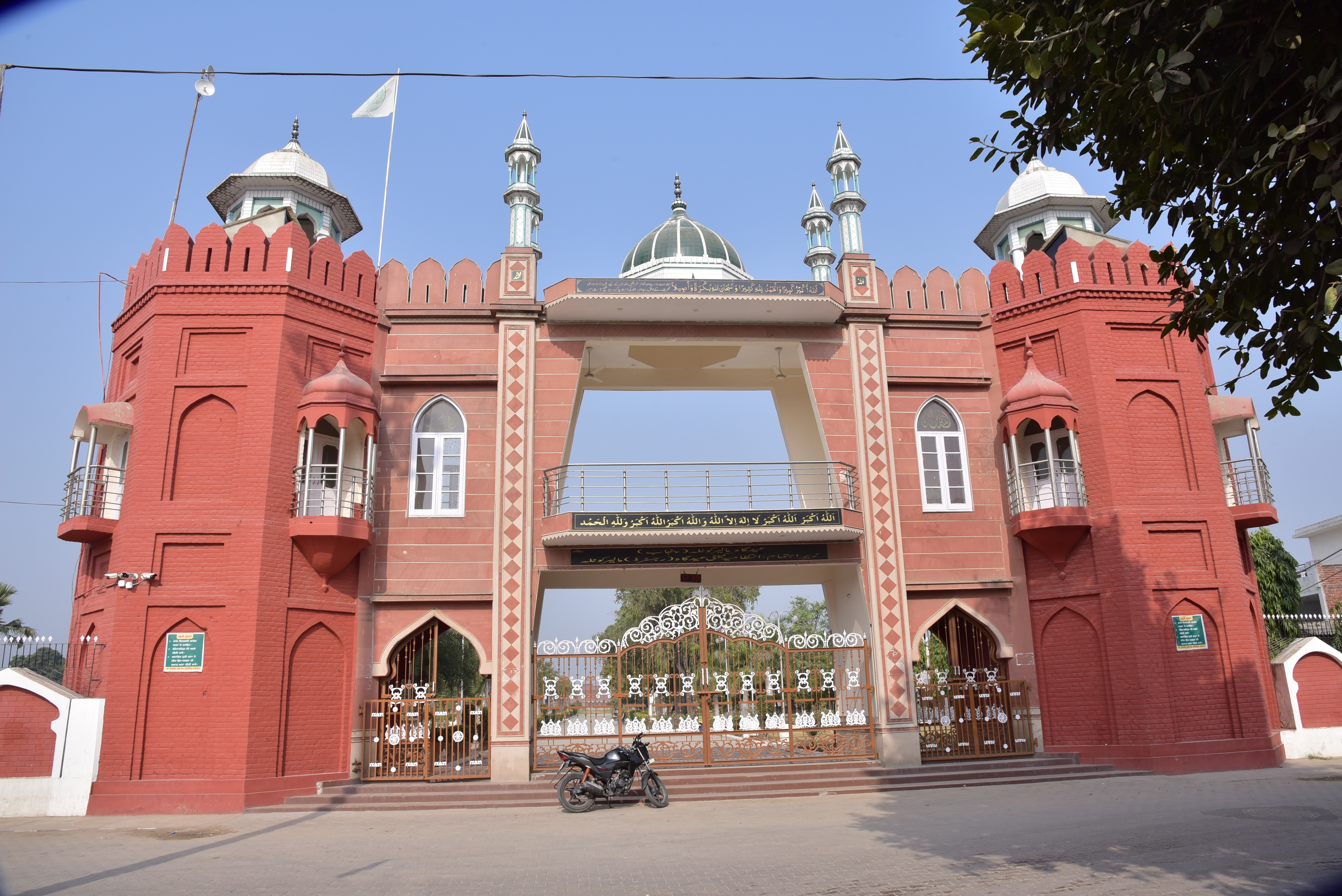
Eidgah
